= 2024 Indonesia Masters =

Badminton tournament in Indonesia

Tournament details
- Dates: 23–28 January
- Edition: 14th
- Level: Super 500
- Total prize money: US$420,000
- Venue: Istora Senayan
- Location: Jakarta, Indonesia

Champions
- Men's singles: (Denmark) Anders Antonsen
- Women's singles: (China) Wang Zhiyi
- Men's doubles: (Indonesia) Leo Rolly Carnando (Indonesia) Daniel Marthin
- Women's doubles: (China) Liu Shengshu (China) Tan Ning
- Mixed doubles: (China) Zheng Siwei (China) Huang Yaqiong

The 2024 Indonesia Masters (officially known as the Daihatsu Indonesia Masters 2024 for sponsorship reasons) was a badminton tournament that took place at the Istora Senayan, Jakarta, Indonesia, from 23 to 28 January 2024 and had a total prize of US$420,000.

== Tournament ==
The 2024 Indonesia Masters was the third tournament of the 2024 BWF World Tour and is part of the Indonesia Masters championships, which had been held since 2010. This tournament was organized by the Badminton Association of Indonesia with sanction from the BWF.

=== Venue ===
This tournament was held at the Istora Senayan in Jakarta, Indonesia.

=== Point distribution ===
Below is the point distribution table for each phase of the tournament based on the BWF points system for the BWF World Tour Super 500 event.

Winner	Runner-up	3/4	5/8	9/16	17/32	33/64	65/128
9,200	7,800	6,420	5,040	3,600	2,220	880	430

=== Prize pool ===
The total prize money is US$420,000 with the distribution of the prize money in accordance with BWF regulations.

Event	Winner	Finalist	Semi-finals	Quarter-finals	Last 16
Singles	$31,500	$15,960	$6,090	$2,520	$1,470
Doubles	$33,180	$15,960	$5,880	$3,045	$1,575

== Men's singles ==
=== Seeds ===
1. (Japan) Kodai Naraoka (withdrew)
2. (China) Li Shifeng (first round)
3. (Indonesia) Anthony Sinisuka Ginting (semi-finals)
4. (Indonesia) Jonatan Christie (first round)
5. (China) Shi Yuqi (withdrew)
6. (Thailand) Kunlavut Vitidsarn (semi-finals)
7. (India) Prannoy H. S. (first round)
8. (Denmark) Anders Antonsen (champion)

=== Finals ===
Semi-finals
8	(Denmark) Anders Antonsen	21	21
6	(Thailand) Kunlavut Vitidsarn	14	8
3	(Indonesia) Anthony Sinisuka Ginting	21	17	19
(Canada) Brian Yang	13	21	21

Final
8	(Denmark) Anders Antonsen	18	21	21
(Canada) Brian Yang	21	13	18

=== Top half ===
==== Section 1 ====
First round
PFQ	(Chinese Taipei) Lee C-h	12	21	21
Q2	(France) A Merklé	21	19	14
Q1	(China) Lei LX	24	21
(Chinese Taipei) Lin C-y	22	17
8	(Denmark) A Antonsen	21	21
(Indonesia) C A Dwi Wardoyo	15	10
(India) L Sen	24	21
(China) Weng HY	22	15

Second round
PFQ	(Chinese Taipei) Lee C-h	13	15
Q1	(China) Lei LX	21	21
8	(Denmark) A Antonsen	21	21
(India) L Sen	19	18

Quarter-finals
Q1	(China) Lei LX	17	17
8	(Denmark) A Antonsen	21	21

==== Section 2 ====
First round
4	(Indonesia) J Christie	21	19	19
(China) Lu GZ	19	21	21
(France) T J Popov	21	16	19
Q4	(India) K George	18	21	21
6	(Thailand) K Vitidsarn	21	21
(Chinese Taipei) Wang T-w	13	16
(Chinese Taipei) Chou T-c	21	21
(France) C Popov	19	18

Second round
(China) Lu GZ	11	21	18
Q4	(India) K George	21	13	21
6	(Thailand) K Vitidsarn	21	21
(Chinese Taipei) Chou T-c	14	9

Quarter-finals
Q4	(India) K George	14	6
6	(Thailand) K Vitidsarn	21	21

=== Bottom half ===
==== Section 3 ====
First round
PFQ	(Chinese Taipei) Su L-y	21	13	21
(Hong Kong) Lee C Y	19	21	18
(Singapore) Loh K Y	21	19	21
7	(India) Prannoy H. S.	18	21	10
Q3	(Malaysia) Leong J H	21	21
(Japan) K Nishimoto	17	17
PFQ	(Thailand) K Wangcharoen	13	15
3	(Indonesia) A S Ginting	21	21

Second round
PFQ	(Chinese Taipei) Su L-y	11	16
(Singapore) Loh K Y	21	21
Q3	(Malaysia) Leong J H	15	17
3	(Indonesia) A S Ginting	21	21

Quarter-finals
(Singapore) Loh K Y	17	19
3	(Indonesia) A S Ginting	21	21

==== Section 4 ====
First round
(Malaysia) Lee Z J	19	21	21
(India) S Kidambi	21	14	11
(Hong Kong) Ng K L	21	24
PFQ	(Denmark) M Johannesen	17	22
(Denmark) R Gemke	18	19
(India) P Rajawat	21	21
(Canada) B Yang	21	14	23
2	(China) Li SF	18	21	21

Second round
(Malaysia) Lee Z J	22	21
(Hong Kong) Ng K L	20	15
(India) P Rajawat	18	14
(Canada) B Yang	21	21

Quarter-finals
(Malaysia) Lee Z J	14	0^{r}
(Canada) B Yang	21	0

== Women's singles ==
=== Seeds ===
1. (China) Chen Yufei (withdrew)
2. (Japan) Akane Yamaguchi (withdrew)
3. (Spain) Carolina Marín (withdrew)
4. (China) He Bingjiao (semi-finals)
5. (Indonesia) Gregoria Mariska Tunjung (quarter-finals)
6. (China) Han Yue (quarter-finals)
7. (United States) Beiwen Zhang (second round)
8. (China) Wang Zhiyi (champion)

=== Finals ===
Semi-finals
8	(China) Wang Zhiyi	18	21	21
4	(China) He Bingjiao	21	14	7
(Japan) Nozomi Okuhara	21	24
PFQ	(Japan) Natsuki Nidaira	16	22

Final
8	(China) Wang Zhiyi	21	21
(Japan) Nozomi Okuhara	14	13

=== Top half ===
==== Section 1 ====
First round
PFQ	(China) Gao FJ	22	21
(Vietnam) Nguyễn T L	20	14
(Canada) M Li	21	21
(Chinese Taipei) Sung S-y	10	17
8	(China) Wang ZY	9	21	21
(Singapore) Yeo J M	21	15	18
(Denmark) L Kjærsfeldt	16	21	17
(Japan) A Ohori	21	18	21

Second round
PFQ	(China) Gao FJ	21	21
(Canada) M Li	13	14
8	(China) Wang ZY	21	21
(Japan) A Ohori	18	12

Quarter-finals
PFQ	(China) Gao FJ	18	15
8	(China) Wang ZY	21	21

==== Section 2 ====
First round
4	(China) He BJ	21	21
(Denmark) L Christophersen	12	19
(China) Zhang YM	21	21
(Scotland) K Gilmour	11	16
6	(China) Han Y	21	21
(Malaysia) Goh J W	9	11
(Thailand) B Ongbamrungphan	21	0
(Thailand) P Chochuwong	19	0^{r}

Second round
4	(China) He BJ	21	21
(China) Zhang YM	12	11
6	(China) Han Y	21	21
(Thailand) B Ongbamrungphan	10	17

Quarter-finals
4	(China) He BJ	21	18	21
6	(China) Han Y	15	21	10

=== Bottom half ===
==== Section 3 ====
First round
Q4	(Indonesia) E N T Wardoyo	21	21
Q3	(Canada) W Y Zhang	16	11
(Germany) Y Li	17	15
5	(Indonesia) G M Tunjung	21	21
(Chinese Taipei) Hsu W-c	21	15	20
(Japan) N Okuhara	13	21	22
(Denmark) M Blichfeldt
PFQ	(Chinese Taipei) Lin H-t	w	/	o

Second round
Q4	(Indonesia) E N T Wardoyo	5	11
5	(Indonesia) G M Tunjung	21	21
(Japan) N Okuhara	21	21
PFQ	(Chinese Taipei) Lin H-t	10	9

Quarter-finals
5	(Indonesia) G M Tunjung	20	11
(Japan) N Okuhara	22	21

==== Section 4 ====
First round
(Thailand) R Intanon	21	21
Q1	(Chinese Taipei) Huang Y-h	11	17
(Chinese Taipei) Pai Y-p	16	17
7	(United States) BW Zhang	21	21
(Indonesia) P K Wardani	21	21
Q2	(Malaysia) Letshanaa K	17	12
(Thailand) S Katethong	21	7
PFQ	(Japan) N Nidaira	23	21

Second round
(Thailand) R Intanon	21	8	21
7	(United States) BW Zhang	11	21	14
(Indonesia) P K Wardani	20	16
PFQ	(Japan) N Nidaira	22	21

Quarter-finals
(Thailand) R Intanon	16	12
PFQ	(Japan) N Nidaira	21	21

== Men's doubles ==
=== Seeds ===
1. (India) Satwiksairaj Rankireddy / Chirag Shetty (withdrew)
2. (Denmark) Kim Astrup / Anders Skaarup Rasmussen (final)
3. (Indonesia) Fajar Alfian / Muhammad Rian Ardianto (semi-finals)
4. (China) Liu Yuchen / Ou Xuanyi (semi-finals)
5. (Indonesia) Muhammad Shohibul Fikri / Bagas Maulana (quarter-finals)
6. (Chinese Taipei) Lee Yang / Wang Chi-lin (second round)
7. (Indonesia) Leo Rolly Carnando / Daniel Marthin (champions)
8. (Malaysia) Ong Yew Sin / Teo Ee Yi (second round)

=== Finals ===
Semi-finals
7	(Indonesia) Leo Rolly Carnando (Indonesia) Daniel Marthin	19	21	21
3	(Indonesia) Fajar Alfian (Indonesia) Muhammad Rian Ardianto	21	14	17
4	(China) Liu Yuchen (China) Ou Xuanyi	14	19
2	(Denmark) Kim Astrup (Denmark) Anders Skaarup Rasmussen	21	21

Final
7	(Indonesia) Leo Rolly Carnando (Indonesia) Daniel Marthin	21	20	21
2	(Denmark) Kim Astrup (Denmark) Anders Skaarup Rasmussen	12	22	11

=== Top half ===
==== Section 1 ====
First round
PFQ	(Malaysia) Choong H J (Malaysia) M Haikal	21	21
Q4	(Chinese Taipei) Wei C-w (Chinese Taipei) Wu G-x	16	18
(Chinese Taipei) Chang K-c (Chinese Taipei) Po L-w	21	18	19
(Denmark) D Lundgaard (Denmark) M Vestergaard	17	21	21
7	(Indonesia) L R Carnando (Indonesia) D Marthin	21	21
(Germany) M Lamsfuß (Germany) M Seidel	16	17
Q1	(China) Xie HN (China) Zeng WH	21	21
Q2	(Republic of Ireland) J Magee (Republic of Ireland) P Reynolds	11	12

Second round
PFQ	(Malaysia) Choong H J (Malaysia) M Haikal	17	19
(Denmark) D Lundgaard (Denmark) M Vestergaard	21	21
7	(Indonesia) L R Carnando (Indonesia) D Marthin	21	21
Q1	(China) Xie HN (China) Zeng WH	16	17

Quarter-finals
(Denmark) D Lundgaard (Denmark) M Vestergaard	14	12
7	(Indonesia) L R Carnando (Indonesia) D Marthin	21	21

==== Section 2 ====
First round
3	(Indonesia) F Alfian (Indonesia) M R Ardianto	21	21
(Chinese Taipei) Lee J-h (Chinese Taipei) Yang P-hs	16	14
(Malaysia) Man W C (Malaysia) Tee K W	17	21	21
PFQ	(Denmark) A Søndergaard (Denmark) J Toft	21	10	14
5	(Indonesia) M S Fikri (Indonesia) B Maulana	21	17	21
(China) Chen BY (China) Liu Yi	16	21	17
(Japan) A Koga (Japan) T Saito	17	21	21
(Chinese Taipei) Lu C-y (Chinese Taipei) Yang P-ha	21	16	18

Second round
3	(Indonesia) F Alfian (Indonesia) M R Ardianto	21	22
(Malaysia) Man W C (Malaysia) Tee K W	18	20
5	(Indonesia) M S Fikri (Indonesia) B Maulana	21	21
(Japan) A Koga (Japan) T Saito	15	18

Quarter-finals
3	(Indonesia) F Alfian (Indonesia) M R Ardianto	21	21
5	(Indonesia) M S Fikri (Indonesia) B Maulana	13	12

=== Bottom half ===
==== Section 3 ====
First round
(South Korea) Kim W-h (South Korea) Na S-s	21	19	16
(Indonesia) S K Gutama (Indonesia) M R P Isfahani	13	21	21
Q3	(Czech Republic) O Král (Czech Republic) A Mendrek	11	10
8	(Malaysia) Ong Y S (Malaysia) Teo E Y	21	21
(Scotland) A Dunn (Scotland) A Hall	21	21
(Canada) A Dong (Canada) N Yakura	9	14
(Denmark) R Kjær (Denmark) F Søgaard	21	13	20
4	(China) Liu YC (China) Ou XY	18	21	22

Second round
(Indonesia) S K Gutama (Indonesia) M R P Isfahani	21	21
8	(Malaysia) Ong Y S (Malaysia) Teo E Y	15	11
(Scotland) A Dunn (Scotland) A Hall	14	19
4	(China) Liu YC (China) Ou XY	21	21

Quarter-finals
(Indonesia) S K Gutama (Indonesia) M R P Isfahani	21	19	6
4	(China) Liu YC (China) Ou XY	11	21	21

==== Section 4 ====
First round
(Malaysia) Goh S F (Malaysia) N Izzuddin	21	14	18
PFQ	(Thailand) P Kaosamaang (Thailand) W Thongsa-nga	14	21	21
PFQ	(United States) V Chiu (United States) J Yuan	17	12
6	(Chinese Taipei) Lee Y (Chinese Taipei) Wang C-l	21	21
(China) He JT (China) Ren XY	21	18	21
(France) C Popov (France) T J Popov	13	21	10
(Chinese Taipei) Lee F-c (Chinese Taipei) Lee F-j	16	15
2	(Denmark) K Astrup (Denmark) A S Rasmussen	21	21

Second round
PFQ	(Thailand) P Kaosamaang (Thailand) W Thongsa-nga	21	22
6	(Chinese Taipei) Lee Y (Chinese Taipei) Wang C-l	19	20
(China) He JT (China) Ren XY	18	13
2	(Denmark) K Astrup (Denmark) A S Rasmussen	21	21

Quarter-finals
PFQ	(Thailand) P Kaosamaang (Thailand) W Thongsa-nga	7	23
2	(Denmark) K Astrup (Denmark) A S Rasmussen	21	25

== Women's doubles ==
=== Seeds ===
1. (Japan) Nami Matsuyama / Chiharu Shida (withdrew)
2. (Indonesia) Apriyani Rahayu / Siti Fadia Silva Ramadhanti (first round)
3. (China) Zhang Shuxian / Zheng Yu (final)
4. (China) Liu Shengshu / Tan Ning (champions)
5. (Japan) Mayu Matsumoto / Wakana Nagahara (withdrew)
6. (Thailand) Jongkolphan Kititharakul / Rawinda Prajongjai (semi-finals)
7. (South Korea) Jeong Na-eun / Kim Hye-jeong (withdrew)
8. (Malaysia) Pearly Tan / Thinaah Muralitharan (quarter-finals)

=== Finals ===
Semi-finals
6	(Thailand) Jongkolphan Kititharakul (Thailand) Rawinda Prajongjai	12	21	14
3	(China) Zhang Shuxian (China) Zheng Yu	21	12	21
4	(China) Liu Shengshu (China) Tan Ning	21	21
(Indonesia) Lanny Tria Mayasari (Indonesia) Ribka Sugiarto	14	11

Final
3	(China) Zhang Shuxian (China) Zheng Yu	21	19	20
4	(China) Liu Shengshu (China) Tan Ning	10	21	22

=== Top half ===
==== Section 1 ====
First round
PFQ	(United States) P L Cao Hok (United States) L Lam	18	20
(United States) F Corbett (United States) A Lee	21	22
(China) Li WM (China) Liu XX	12	21	21
Q3	(Chinese Taipei) Hu L-f (Chinese Taipei) Lin X-m	21	12	14
6	(Thailand) J Kititharakul (Thailand) R Prajongjai	21	21
Q4	(Australia) K Ea (Australia) G Somerville	8	9
(Bulgaria) G Stoeva (Bulgaria) S Stoeva	21	7	21
(China) Li YJ (China) Luo XM	15	21	16

Second round
(United States) F Corbett (United States) A Lee	14	16
(China) Li WM (China) Liu XX	21	21
6	(Thailand) J Kititharakul (Thailand) R Prajongjai	21	21
(Bulgaria) G Stoeva (Bulgaria) S Stoeva	14	19

Quarter-finals
(China) Li WM (China) Liu XX	21	17	10
6	(Thailand) J Kititharakul (Thailand) R Prajongjai	18	21	21

==== Section 2 ====
First round
3	(China) Zhang SX (China) Zheng Y	21	21
(Chinese Taipei) Hsu Y-c (Chinese Taipei) Lin W-c	17	15
(Chinese Taipei) Lee C-h (Chinese Taipei) Teng C-h	16	19
(Indonesia) M T Puspita Sari (Indonesia) R A Rose	21	21
PFQ	(Chinese Taipei) Chang C-h (Chinese Taipei) Yang C-t	14	19
(Denmark) M Fruergaard (Denmark) S Thygesen	21	21
(Indonesia) F D Kusuma (Indonesia) A C Pratiwi	18	13
PFQ	(Indonesia) J P Miantoro (Indonesia) F Setianingrum	21	21

Second round
3	(China) Zhang SX (China) Zheng Y	21	21
(Indonesia) M T Puspita Sari (Indonesia) R A Rose	18	12
(Denmark) M Fruergaard (Denmark) S Thygesen	21	21
PFQ	(Indonesia) J P Miantoro (Indonesia) F Setianingrum	12	15

Quarter-finals
3	(China) Zhang SX (China) Zheng Y	21	23
(Denmark) M Fruergaard (Denmark) S Thygesen	18	21

=== Bottom half ===
==== Section 3 ====
First round
(Japan) R Miyaura (Japan) A Sakuramoto	7	20
(France) M Lambert (France) A Tran	21	22
Q2	(China) Keng SL (China) Zhang C	12	18
8	(Malaysia) P Tan (Malaysia) Thinaah M	21	21
(Malaysia) V Hoo (Malaysia) Lim C S	w	/	o
Q1
PFQ	(Chinese Taipei) Sung S-y (Chinese Taipei) Yu C-h	12	12
4	(China) Liu SS (China) Tan N	21	21

Second round
(France) M Lambert (France) A Tran	14	10
8	(Malaysia) P Tan (Malaysia) Thinaah M	21	21
(Malaysia) V Hoo (Malaysia) Lim C S	15	15
4	(China) Liu SS (China) Tan N	21	21

Quarter-finals
8	(Malaysia) P Tan (Malaysia) Thinaah M	16	9
4	(China) Liu SS (China) Tan N	21	21

==== Section 4 ====
First round
(Indonesia) L T Mayasari (Indonesia) R Sugiarto	22	21
(Germany) L Efler (Germany) I Lohau	20	17
(United States) A Xu (United States) K Xu	21	21
PFQ	(Chinese Taipei) Liu C-y (Chinese Taipei) Wang Y-q	19	10
(South Korea) Lee Y-l (South Korea) Shin S-c	21	16	21
(Hong Kong) Yeung N T (Hong Kong) Yeung P L	17	21	6
(Netherlands) D Jille (Netherlands) C Seinen	21	21
2	(Indonesia) A Rahayu (Indonesia) S F S Ramadhanti	14	17

Second round
(Indonesia) L T Mayasari (Indonesia) R Sugiarto	21	21
(United States) A Xu (United States) K Xu	19	18
(South Korea) Lee Y-l (South Korea) Shin S-c	21	13	17
(Netherlands) D Jille (Netherlands) C Seinen	15	21	21

Quarter-finals
(Indonesia) L T Mayasari (Indonesia) R Sugiarto	21	21
(Netherlands) D Jille (Netherlands) C Seinen	10	16

== Mixed doubles ==
=== Seeds ===
1. (China) Zheng Siwei / Huang Yaqiong (champions)
2. (China) Feng Yanzhe / Huang Dongping (withdrew)
3. (China) Jiang Zhenbang / Wei Yaxin (quarter-finals)
4. (South Korea) Kim Won-ho / Jeong Na-eun (semi-finals)
5. (Hong Kong) Tang Chun Man / Tse Ying Suet (withdrew)
6. (Malaysia) Chen Tang Jie / Toh Ee Wei (second round)
7. (Denmark) Mathias Christiansen / Alexandra Bøje (withdrew)
8. (France) Thom Gicquel / Delphine Delrue (first round)

=== Finals ===
Semi-finals
1	(China) Zheng Siwei (China) Huang Yaqiong	21	21
4	(South Korea) Kim Won-ho (South Korea) Jeong Na-eun	11	18
(Japan) Hiroki Midorikawa (Japan) Natsu Saito	21	21
Q2	(Denmark) Jesper Toft (Denmark) Clara Graversen	12	13

Final
1	(China) Zheng Siwei (China) Huang Yaqiong	21	21
(Japan) Hiroki Midorikawa (Japan) Natsu Saito	15	16

=== Top half ===
==== Section 1 ====
First round
1	(China) Zheng SW (China) Huang YQ	21	21
(Indonesia) D Ferdinansyah (Indonesia) G E Widjaja	14	13
(Singapore) T Hee (Singapore) J Tan	21	21
(Japan) Y Kaneko (Japan) M Matsutomo	10	15
PFQ	(Malaysia) Chan P S (Malaysia) Cheah Y S	21	21
(United States) V Chiu (United States) J Gai	17	11
(Denmark) M Thyrri (Denmark) A Magelund	19	21	19
(Malaysia) Tan K M (Malaysia) Lai P J	21	18	21

Second round
1	(China) Zheng SW (China) Huang YQ	21	16	21
(Singapore) T Hee (Singapore) J Tan	12	21	19
PFQ	(Malaysia) Chan P S (Malaysia) Cheah Y S	12	16
(Malaysia) Tan K M (Malaysia) Lai P J	21	21

Quarter-finals
1	(China) Zheng SW (China) Huang YQ	18	21	21
(Malaysia) Tan K M (Malaysia) Lai P J	21	18	13

==== Section 2 ====
First round
4	(South Korea) Kim W-h (South Korea) Jeong N-e	19	30	21
Q1	(Malaysia) Choong H J (Malaysia) Go P K	21	28	13
(Malaysia) Goh S H (Malaysia) S J Lai	21	21
(Thailand) R Oupthong (Thailand) J Sudjaipraparat	15	15
PFQ	(China) Cheng X (China) Zhang C	15	15
(Japan) K Yamashita (Japan) N Shinoya	21	21
(Netherlands) R Tabeling (Netherlands) S Piek	21	21
Q4	(Indonesia) J Hidayatullah (Indonesia) A S P Pranata	18	12

Second round
4	(South Korea) Kim W-h (South Korea) Jeong N-e	21	21
(Malaysia) Goh S H (Malaysia) S J Lai	10	16
(Japan) K Yamashita (Japan) N Shinoya	11	18
(Netherlands) R Tabeling (Netherlands) S Piek	21	21

Quarter-finals
4	(South Korea) Kim W-h (South Korea) Jeong N-e	15	21	21
(Netherlands) R Tabeling (Netherlands) S Piek	21	18	15

=== Bottom half ===
==== Section 3 ====
First round
(Japan) H Midorikawa (Japan) N Saito	21	21
Q3	(Australia) K Choo (Australia) G Somerville	13	13
(Hong Kong) Lee C H (Hong Kong) Ng T Y	22	21
8	(France) T Gicquel (France) D Delrue	20	14
(Indonesia) R Rivaldy (Indonesia) P H Mentari	23	24
(Denmark) M Vestergaard (Denmark) C Busch	21	22
(Germany) M Lamsfuß (Germany) I Lohau	21	14	20
3	(China) Jiang ZB (China) Wei YX	14	21	22

Second round
(Japan) H Midorikawa (Japan) N Saito	21	21
(Hong Kong) Lee C H (Hong Kong) Ng T Y	19	12
(Indonesia) R Rivaldy (Indonesia) P H Mentari	13	13
3	(China) Jiang ZB (China) Wei YX	21	21

Quarter-finals
(Japan) H Midorikawa (Japan) N Saito	13	21	21
3	(China) Jiang ZB (China) Wei YX	21	16	17

==== Section 4 ====
First round
(Indonesia) R N Kusharjanto (Indonesia) L A Kusumawati	21	21
PFQ	(Indonesia) A Maulana (Indonesia) N V Marwah	9	10
(Chinese Taipei) Ye H-w (Chinese Taipei) Lee C-h
6	(Malaysia) Chen T J (Malaysia) Toh E W	w	/	o
(Chinese Taipei) Chang K-c (Chinese Taipei) Lee C-c	20	10
Q2	(Denmark) J Toft (Denmark) C Graversen	22	21
(Chinese Taipei) Yang P-hs (Chinese Taipei) Hu L-f	24	21
PFQ	(England) G Mairs (England) J Mairs	22	12

Second round
(Indonesia) R N Kusharjanto (Indonesia) L A Kusumawati	12	21	21
6	(Malaysia) Chen T J (Malaysia) Toh E W	21	13	14
Q2	(Denmark) J Toft (Denmark) C Graversen	21	6	21
(Chinese Taipei) Yang P-hs (Chinese Taipei) Hu L-f	13	21	12

Quarter-finals
(Indonesia) R N Kusharjanto (Indonesia) L A Kusumawati	15	16
Q2	(Denmark) J Toft (Denmark) C Graversen	21	21

Preceded by 2024 India Open	BWF World Tour; 2024 BWF season	Succeeded by 2024 Thailand Masters
