= 2023 Indonesia Masters Super 100 II =

Badminton tournament in Indonesia

Tournament details
- Dates: 24–29 October
- Edition: 5th
- Level: Super 100
- Total prize money: US$100,000
- Venue: Jatim International Expo Convention Exhibition
- Location: Surabaya, East Java, Indonesia

Champions
- Men's singles: (Japan) Takuma Obayashi
- Women's singles: (Japan) Tomoka Miyazaki
- Men's doubles: (Japan) Kenya Mitsuhashi (Japan) Hiroki Okamura
- Women's doubles: (Indonesia) Lanny Tria Mayasari (Indonesia) Ribka Sugiarto
- Mixed doubles: (Indonesia) Jafar Hidayatullah (Indonesia) Aisyah Salsabila Putri Pranata

The 2023 Indonesia Masters Super 100 II (officially known as the BNI Indonesia Masters II 2023 for sponsorship reasons) was a badminton tournament which took place at Jatim International Expo Convention Exhibition in Surabaya, East Java, Indonesia, from 24 to 29 October 2023 and had a total purse of $100,000.

== Tournament ==
The 2023 Indonesia Masters Super 100 II was the twenty-eighth tournament of the 2023 BWF World Tour and the second edition of the Indonesia Masters Super 100 championships this year, which had been held since 2018. This tournament was organized by the Badminton Association of Indonesia and sanctioned by the BWF.

=== Venue ===
This tournament was held at Jatim International Expo Convention Exhibition in Surabaya, East Java, Indonesia.

=== Point distribution ===
Below is the point distribution table for each phase of the tournament based on the BWF points system for the BWF Tour Super 100 event.

Winner	Runner-up	3/4	5/8	9/16	17/32	33/64	65/128	129/256
5,500	4,680	3,850	3,030	2,110	1,290	510	240	100

=== Prize pool ===
The total prize money was US$100,000 with the distribution of the prize money in accordance with BWF regulations.

Event	Winner	Finalist	Semi-finals	Quarter-finals	Last 16
Singles	$7,500	$3,800	$1,450	$600	$350
Doubles	$7,900	$3,800	$1,400	$725	$375

== Men's singles ==
=== Seeds ===
1. (Chinese Taipei) Su Li-yang (semi-finals)
2. (Japan) Takuma Obayashi (champion)
3. (Chinese Taipei) Chi Yu-jen (semi-finals)
4. (South Korea) Jeon Hyeok-jin (withdrew)
5. (Japan) Yushi Tanaka (quarter-finals)
6. (India) Mithun Manjunath (withdrew)
7. (Malaysia) Cheam June Wei (second round)
8. (Chinese Taipei) Huang Yu-kai (second round)

=== Finals ===
Semi-finals
1	(Chinese Taipei) Su Li-yang	20	16
Q2	(South Korea) Choi Ji-hoon	21	21
3	(Chinese Taipei) Chi Yu-jen	21	19	18
2	(Japan) Takuma Obayashi	15	21	21

Final
Q2	(South Korea) Choi Ji-hoon	8	19
2	(Japan) Takuma Obayashi	21	21

=== Top half ===
==== Section 1 ====
First round
(Malaysia) E Vasigaran	21	24	21
(Sri Lanka) D Abeywickrama	14	26	19
(Indonesia) A Farhan	24	15	17
(Malaysia) Kok J H	22	21	11^{r}
(Japan) R Hatano	21	21
PFQ	(Indonesia) M R Al Fajri	19	11
(Japan) R Muramoto	9	21	21
(Malaysia) Ong Z Y	21	19	17

Second round
1	(Chinese Taipei) Su L-y	21	21
(Malaysia) E Vasigaran	16	11
(Malaysia) Aidil S	21	10	20
(Indonesia) A Farhan	19	21	22
8	(Chinese Taipei) Huang Y-k	13	21	10
(Japan) R Hatano	21	16	21
(Hong Kong) Chan Y C	19	16
(Japan) R Muramoto	21	21

Third round
1	(Chinese Taipei) Su L-y	21	21
(Indonesia) A Farhan	19	16
(Japan) R Hatano	21	13	21
(Japan) R Muramoto	10	21	12

Quarter-finals
1	(Chinese Taipei) Su L-y	21	21
(Japan) R Hatano	14	10

==== Section 2 ====
First round
(South Korea) Cho G-y	21	15	21
(Thailand) P Teeraratsakul	14	21	7
(Indonesia) K A Nugraha	15	21	21
(Malaysia) Chua K S	21	10	14
(Indonesia) Y S Marcellyno	21	21
(Indonesia) I D Syahputra	11	16
(Indonesia) T Sulistio	12	16
(Malaysia) Ong K Y	21	21

Second round
PFQ	(Thailand) K Laotrakul	14	8
(South Korea) Cho G-y	21	21
(Indonesia) A W Chairullah	21	21
(Indonesia) K A Nugraha	18	9
7	(Malaysia) Cheam J W	9	13
(Indonesia) Y S Marcellyno	21	21
Q2	(South Korea) Choi J-h	21	18	21
(Malaysia) Ong K Y	13	21	12

Third round
(South Korea) Cho G-y	21	21
(Indonesia) A W Chairullah	16	17
(Indonesia) Y S Marcellyno	19	12
Q2	(South Korea) Choi J-h	21	21

Quarter-finals
(South Korea) Cho G-y	19	15
Q2	(South Korea) Choi J-h	21	21

=== Bottom half ===
==== Section 3 ====
First round
(England) R Midha	15	13
(United States) M S Alcala	21	21
(Indonesia) J C Alexander	15	13
(Hong Kong) J Gunawan	21	21
(Malaysia) S Shaqeem	21	21
PFQ	(Malaysia) Yap J A	9	4
PFQ	(South Korea) Choi P-g	21	21
Q5	(Malaysia) Lim M H	17	16

Second round
(United States) M S Alcala	19	21	21
Q8	(Chinese Taipei) Lei C-f	21	19	18
(Hong Kong) J Gunawan	6	13
5	(Japan) Y Tanaka	21	21
(Malaysia) S Shaqeem	21	16	15
(Indonesia) T Sugiarto	19	21	21
PFQ	(South Korea) Choi P-g	11	21	7
3	(Chinese Taipei) Chi Y-j	21	9	21

Third round
(United States) M S Alcala	12	13
5	(Japan) Y Tanaka	21	21
(Indonesia) T Sugiarto	12	12
3	(Chinese Taipei) Chi Y-j	21	21

Quarter-finals
5	(Japan) Y Tanaka	15	16
3	(Chinese Taipei) Chi Y-j	21	21

==== Section 4 ====
First round
Q4	(Malaysia) Teh J H	21	12	14
Q7	(Indonesia) P B Shujiwo	19	21	21
(Japan) K Takahashi	w	/	o
(Malaysia) Lim C K
Q3	(Malaysia) King K H	w	/	o
(India) S Verma
(Indonesia) I Rumbay	21	18	21
Q1	(Malaysia) S Lee	17	21	17

Second round
Q7	(Indonesia) P B Shujiwo	21	21
Q6	(Chinese Taipei) See Y	11	16
(Japan) K Takahashi	21	21
PFQ	(Sri Lanka) R Hendahewa	14	11
Q3	(Malaysia) King K H	17	16
(Malaysia) Soong J V	21	21
(Indonesia) I Rumbay	17	21	14
2	(Japan) T Obayashi	21	14	21

Third round
Q7	(Indonesia) P B Shujiwo	19	15
(Japan) K Takahashi	21	21
(Malaysia) Soong J V	21	13	12
2	(Japan) T Obayashi	19	21	21

Quarter-finals
(Japan) K Takahashi	21	15	9
2	(Japan) T Obayashi	16	21	21

== Women's singles ==
=== Seeds ===
1. (South Korea) Sim Yu-jin (semi-finals)
2. (Japan) Riko Gunji (withdrew)
3. (Myanmar) Thet Htar Thuzar (second round)
4. (Indonesia) Komang Ayu Cahya Dewi (withdrew)
5. (Indonesia) Ester Nurumi Tri Wardoyo (first round)
6. (Thailand) Pornpicha Choeikeewong (final)
7. (Japan) Manami Suizu (second round)
8. (Japan) Asuka Takahashi (quarter-finals)

=== Finals ===
Semi-finals
1	(South Korea) Sim Yu-jin	18	15
6	(Thailand) Pornpicha Choeikeewong	21	21
(Japan) Tomoka Miyazaki	10	21	21
PFQ	(South Korea) Lee Se-yeon	21	10	15

Final
6	(Thailand) Pornpicha Choeikeewong	9	15
(Japan) Tomoka Miyazaki	21	21

=== Top half ===
==== Section 1 ====
First round
1	(South Korea) Sim Y-j	18	21	22
(Japan) A Kurihara	21	9	20
(Indonesia) Ruzana	12	20
(South Korea) Kim G-r	21	22
5	(Indonesia) E N T Wardoyo	21	7	10
(Japan) H Akechi	14	21	21
(Indonesia) A S Fatetani	18	21	21
(Indonesia) Y Y Susanto	21	15	12

Second round
1	(South Korea) Sim Y-j	21	21
(South Korea) Kim G-r	11	9
(Japan) H Akechi	19	21	21
(Indonesia) A S Fatetani	21	10	12

Quarter-finals
1	(South Korea) Sim Y-j	21	17	21
(Japan) H Akechi	9	21	15

==== Section 2 ====
First round
PFQ	(South Korea) Park G-e	16	21	21
(South Korea) Kim J-e	21	10	23
(Hong Kong) Lo S Y	21	21
(Malaysia) K Radhakrishnan	10	9
6	(Thailand) P Choeikeewong	21	21
Q2	(Malaysia) J Ng	14	11
(Indonesia) B Prasista	18	21	21
(Hong Kong) S S Mehta	21	9	14

Second round
(South Korea) Kim J-e	21	8	26
(Hong Kong) Lo S Y	8	21	24
6	(Thailand) P Choeikeewong	21	21
(Indonesia) B Prasista	13	12

Quarter-finals
(South Korea) Kim J-e	21	13	16
6	(Thailand) P Choeikeewong	16	21	21

=== Bottom half ===
==== Section 3 ====
First round
(Japan) T Miyazaki	21	21
(Indonesia) D H Nurtertiati	12	18
(Indonesia) K L Agatha	20	19
7	(Japan) M Suizu	21	21
(Indonesia) S Widjaja	21	21
(Indonesia) M A Puspitasari	9	14
(Hong Kong) Yeung S Y	20	9
3	(Myanmar) Thet Htar T	22	21

Second round
(Japan) T Miyazaki	17	21	21
7	(Japan) M Suizu	21	6	16
(Indonesia) S Widjaja	21	21
3	(Myanmar) Thet Htar T	10	15

Quarter-finals
(Japan) T Miyazaki	21	21
(Indonesia) S Widjaja	13	14

==== Section 4 ====
First round
(Indonesia) T Farahnailah	21	12	11
Q3	(Thailand) T Nithiittikrai	13	21	21
(Indonesia) G M Moningka	15	16
8	(Japan) A Takahashi	21	21
Q1	(Indonesia) C M Handoyo	w	/	o
Q4
(Chinese Taipei) Lee Y-h	21	12	19
PFQ	(South Korea) Lee S-y	18	21	21

Second round
Q3	(Thailand) T Nithiittikrai	14	7
8	(Japan) A Takahashi	21	21
Q1	(Indonesia) C M Handoyo	17	21	15
PFQ	(South Korea) Lee S-y	21	15	21

Quarter-finals
8	(Japan) A Takahashi	17	22
PFQ	(South Korea) Lee S-y	21	24

== Men's doubles ==
=== Seeds ===
1. (Japan) Ayato Endo / Yuta Takei (quarter-finals)
2. (Indonesia) Sabar Karyaman Gutama / Muhammad Reza Pahlevi Isfahani (second round)
3. (Thailand) Pharanyu Kaosamaang / Worrapol Thongsa-nga (second round)
4. (Japan) Shuntaro Mezaki / Haruya Nishida (quarter-finals)
5. (Japan) Kenya Mitsuhashi / Hiroki Okamura (champions)
6. (Malaysia) Low Hang Yee / Ng Eng Cheong (second round)
7. (South Korea) Kim Young-hyuk / Wang Chan (semi-finals)
8. (Japan) Kakeru Kumagai / Kota Ogawa (second round)

=== Finals ===
Semi-finals
7	(South Korea) Kim Young-hyuk (South Korea) Wang Chan	16	19
(Malaysia) Choong Hon Jian (Malaysia) Muhammad Haikal	21	21
5	(Japan) Kenya Mitsuhashi (Japan) Hiroki Okamura	21	14	21
(Chinese Taipei) Wei Chun-wei (Chinese Taipei) Wu Guan-xun	15	21	19

Final
(Malaysia) Choong Hon Jian (Malaysia) Muhammad Haikal	16	18
5	(Japan) Kenya Mitsuhashi (Japan) Hiroki Okamura	21	21

=== Top half ===
==== Section 1 ====
First round
1	(Japan) A Endo (Japan) Y Takei	21	21
(Thailand) W Phakjarung (Thailand) T Viriyangkura	15	15
PFQ	(South Korea) Ki D-j (South Korea) Kim J-h	21	21
(Malaysia) Fazriq R (Malaysia) Wong V S	7	16
7	(South Korea) Kim Y-h (South Korea) Wang C	21	21
(Indonesia) P Erwiansyah (Indonesia) P H Rindorindo	9	13
(Thailand) P Sukphun (Thailand) P Teeraratsakul	14	18
(Indonesia) R Indra (Indonesia) D E Marvino	21	21

Second round
1	(Japan) A Endo (Japan) Y Takei	21	18
PFQ	(South Korea) Ki D-j (South Korea) Kim J-h	19	13^{r}
7	(South Korea) Kim Y-h (South Korea) Wang C	21	21
(Indonesia) R Indra (Indonesia) D E Marvino	17	14

Quarter-finals
1	(Japan) A Endo (Japan) Y Takei	12	16
7	(South Korea) Kim Y-h (South Korea) Wang C	21	21

==== Section 2 ====
First round
3	(Thailand) P Kaosamaang (Thailand) W Thongsa-nga	21	21
Q1	(Thailand) P Horbanluekit (Thailand) T Meechai	11	9
(Malaysia) N M Azriyn A (Malaysia) Tan W K	21	15	15
(Malaysia) Choong H J (Malaysia) M Haikal	14	21	21
8	(Japan) K Kumagai (Japan) K Ogawa	13	21	21
(Malaysia) Lau Y S (Malaysia) Lee Y B	21	12	17
Q4	(Malaysia) M Chai (Malaysia) Choo K Q	8	12
(Australia) R Hidayat (Australia) F W Putra	21	21

Second round
3	(Thailand) P Kaosamaang (Thailand) W Thongsa-nga	19	18
(Malaysia) Choong H J (Malaysia) M Haikal	21	21
8	(Japan) K Kumagai (Japan) K Ogawa	21	19	11
(Australia) R Hidayat (Australia) F W Putra	16	21	21

Quarter-finals
(Malaysia) Choong H J (Malaysia) M Haikal	21	21
(Australia) R Hidayat (Australia) F W Putra	14	14

=== Bottom half ===
==== Section 3 ====
First round
(Indonesia) R Fadillah (Indonesia) R Hidayat	21	21
(Chinese Taipei) Chiu C-r (Chinese Taipei) Yang S-f	7	14
Q3	(Japan) Y Okimoto (Japan) D Tanioka	17	22
5	(Japan) K Mitsuhashi (Japan) H Okamura	21	24
(Malaysia) Lwi S H (Malaysia) J Wong	13	12
PFQ	(South Korea) Cho S-h (South Korea) Na G-m	21	21
(Indonesia) M A Farizi (Indonesia) N Joaquin	17	13
4	(Japan) S Mezaki (Japan) H Nishida	21	21

Second round
(Indonesia) R Fadillah (Indonesia) R Hidayat	11	20
5	(Japan) K Mitsuhashi (Japan) H Okamura	21	22
PFQ	(South Korea) Cho S-h (South Korea) Na G-m	10	13
4	(Japan) S Mezaki (Japan) H Nishida	21	21

Quarter-finals
5	(Japan) K Mitsuhashi (Japan) H Okamura	21	21
4	(Japan) S Mezaki (Japan) H Nishida	10	18

==== Section 4 ====
First round
(Indonesia) T S C Hutomo (Indonesia) C D Wijaya	w	/	o
Q2
(Chinese Taipei) Chiu S-h (Chinese Taipei) Ho W-h	11	16
6	(Malaysia) Low H Y (Malaysia) Ng E C	21	21
(Chinese Taipei) Wei C-w (Chinese Taipei) Wu G-x	21	21
(Chinese Taipei) Chang K-h (Chinese Taipei) Chen Y-c	18	19
(Malaysia) Choi J S (Malaysia) B Goonting	12	15
2	(Indonesia) S K Gutama (Indonesia) M R P Isfahani	21	21

Second round
(Indonesia) T S C Hutomo (Indonesia) C D Wijaya	20	24	21
6	(Malaysia) Low H Y (Malaysia) Ng E C	22	22	19
(Chinese Taipei) Wei C-w (Chinese Taipei) Wu G-x	21	17	21
2	(Indonesia) S K Gutama (Indonesia) M R P Isfahani	18	21	17

Quarter-finals
(Indonesia) T S C Hutomo (Indonesia) C D Wijaya	9	17
(Chinese Taipei) Wei C-w (Chinese Taipei) Wu G-x	21	21

== Women's doubles ==
=== Seeds ===
1. (Indonesia) Lanny Tria Mayasari / Ribka Sugiarto (champions)
2. (Indonesia) Meilysa Trias Puspita Sari / Rachel Allessya Rose (final)
3. (Indonesia) Jesita Putri Miantoro / Febi Setianingrum (semi-finals)
4. (Thailand) Laksika Kanlaha / Phataimas Muenwong (quarter-finals)
5. (Japan) Sayaka Hobara / Yui Suizu (semi-finals)
6. (Indonesia) Ridya Aulia Fatasya / Kelly Larissa (quarter-finals)
7. (Malaysia) Go Pei Kee / Low Yeen Yuan (quarter-finals)
8. (Chinese Taipei) Wang Szu-min / Wu Meng-chen (quarter-finals)

=== Finals ===
Semi-finals
1	(Indonesia) Lanny Tria Mayasari (Indonesia) Ribka Sugiarto	23	9	21
3	(Indonesia) Jesita Putri Miantoro (Indonesia) Febi Setianingrum	21	21	15
5	(Japan) Sayaka Hobara (Japan) Yui Suizu	19	19
2	(Indonesia) Meilysa Trias Puspita Sari (Indonesia) Rachel Allessya Rose	21	21

Final
1	(Indonesia) Lanny Tria Mayasari (Indonesia) Ribka Sugiarto	21	21
2	(Indonesia) Meilysa Trias Puspita Sari (Indonesia) Rachel Allessya Rose	12	16

=== Top half ===
==== Section 1 ====
First round
(Chinese Taipei) Chen Y-t (Chinese Taipei) Hsieh M-y	21	19	21
(Chinese Taipei) Chung C-e (Chinese Taipei) Huang T-l	18	21	18

Second round
1	(Indonesia) L T Mayasari (Indonesia) R Sugiarto	21	21
(Indonesia) S A M Asharunnisa (Indonesia) S S Azzahra	13	15
8	(Chinese Taipei) Wang S-m (Chinese Taipei) Wu M-c	22	21
(Chinese Taipei) Chen Y-t (Chinese Taipei) Hsieh M-y	20	15

Quarter-finals
1	(Indonesia) L T Mayasari (Indonesia) R Sugiarto	21	21
8	(Chinese Taipei) Wang S-m (Chinese Taipei) Wu M-c	13	10

==== Section 2 ====
First round
(Thailand) O Jongsathapornparn (Thailand) A Sapniti	12	19
(South Korea) Kim H-r (South Korea) Lee J-h	21	21

Second round
3	(Indonesia) J P Miantoro (Indonesia) F Setianingrum	21	21
(Indonesia) A Kamila (Indonesia) A Z D Ramadhani	10	15
6	(Indonesia) R A Fatasya (Indonesia) K Larissa	w	/	o
(South Korea) Kim H-r (South Korea) Lee J-h

Quarter-finals
3	(Indonesia) J P Miantoro (Indonesia) F Setianingrum	21	21
6	(Indonesia) R A Fatasya (Indonesia) K Larissa	9	16

=== Bottom half ===
==== Section 3 ====
First round
(Thailand) F Korpthammakit (Thailand) P Srisawat	w	/	o
(Thailand) P Pattanawaritthipan (Thailand) A Povanon
(Indonesia) M R Fitria (Indonesia) M A Putri	21	21
(Japan) M Kanehiro (Japan) R Kiyama	13	20

Second round
(Thailand) F Korpthammakit (Thailand) P Srisawat	7	6^{r}
5	(Japan) S Hobara (Japan) Y Suizu	21	11
(Indonesia) M R Fitria (Indonesia) M A Putri	11	17
4	(Thailand) L Kanlaha (Thailand) P Muenwong	21	21

Quarter-finals
5	(Japan) S Hobara (Japan) Y Suizu	21	22	21
4	(Thailand) L Kanlaha (Thailand) P Muenwong	17	24	19

==== Section 4 ====
First round
(Japan) M Sudo (Japan) N Yamakita	21	21
(Indonesia) A N T Munggaran (Indonesia) A S Rahayu	10	16

Second round
(Japan) M Sudo (Japan) N Yamakita	21	18	14
7	(Malaysia) Go P K (Malaysia) Low Y Y	17	21	21
(Malaysia) Cheng S H (Malaysia) C Ting
2	(Indonesia) M T Puspita Sari (Indonesia) R A Rose	w	/	o

Quarter-finals
7	(Malaysia) Go P K (Malaysia) Low Y Y	21	20	13
2	(Indonesia) M T Puspita Sari (Indonesia) R A Rose	19	22	21

== Mixed doubles ==
=== Seeds ===
1. (Thailand) Ruttanapak Oupthong / Jhenicha Sudjaipraparat (final)
2. (Indonesia) Zachariah Josiahno Sumanti / Hediana Julimarbela (second round)
3. (Malaysia) Chan Peng Soon / Cheah Yee See (second round)
4. (Malaysia) Yap Roy King / Valeree Siow (withdrew)
5. (Japan) Hiroki Nishi / Akari Sato (quarter-finals)
6. (Indonesia) Jafar Hidayatullah / Aisyah Salsabila Putri Pranata (champions)
7. (Indonesia) Amri Syahnawi / Winny Oktavina Kandow (semi-finals)
8. (Thailand) Weeraphat Phakjarung / Ornnicha Jongsathapornparn (quarter-finals)

=== Finals ===
Semi-finals
1	(Thailand) Ruttanapak Oupthong (Thailand) Jhenicha Sudjaipraparat	21	23
7	(Indonesia) Amri Syahnawi (Indonesia) Winny Oktavina Kandow	11	21
(South Korea) Kim Young-hyuk (South Korea) Kim Hye-rin	10	16
6	(Indonesia) Jafar Hidayatullah (Indonesia) Aisyah Salsabila Putri Pranata	21	21

Final
1	(Thailand) Ruttanapak Oupthong (Thailand) Jhenicha Sudjaipraparat	17	19
6	(Indonesia) Jafar Hidayatullah (Indonesia) Aisyah Salsabila Putri Pranata	21	21

=== Top half ===
==== Section 1 ====
First round
(South Korea) Cho S-h (South Korea) Lee J-h	21	21
(Thailand) T Meechai (Thailand) F Korpthammakit	13	18
5	(Japan) H Nishi (Japan) Ak Sato	21	21
(Chinese Taipei) Chiu S-h (Chinese Taipei) Huang T-l	13	13
(Chinese Taipei) Yang S-f (Chinese Taipei) Chung C-e	7	15
(Thailand) N Mangkornloi (Thailand) A Povanon	21	21

Second round
1	(Thailand) R Oupthong (Thailand) J Sudjaipraparat	21	21
(South Korea) Cho S-h (South Korea) Lee J-h	19	12
5	(Japan) H Nishi (Japan) Ak Sato	9	21	21
(Thailand) N Mangkornloi (Thailand) A Povanon	21	12	14

Quarter-finals
1	(Thailand) R Oupthong (Thailand) J Sudjaipraparat	23	20	27
5	(Japan) H Nishi (Japan) Ak Sato	21	22	25

==== Section 2 ====
First round
4	(Malaysia) Yap R K (Malaysia) V Siow
(Malaysia) Choong H J (Malaysia) Go P K	w	/	o
(Indonesia) Z Nabawi (Indonesia) F Pasaribu	18	21	21
(Chinese Taipei) Chang K-h (Chinese Taipei) Wang S-m	21	19	12
7	(Indonesia) A Syahnawi (Indonesia) W O Kandow	21	21
(Malaysia) O Ting (Malaysia) Gan J E	7	17
(Chinese Taipei) Chiu C-r (Chinese Taipei) Chen Y-t	19	12
(Malaysia) Lim T J (Malaysia) D Siow	21	21

Second round
(Malaysia) Choong H J (Malaysia) Go P K	21	23	17
(Indonesia) Z Nabawi (Indonesia) F Pasaribu	16	25	21
7	(Indonesia) A Syahnawi (Indonesia) W O Kandow	21	21
(Malaysia) Lim T J (Malaysia) D Siow	16	12

Quarter-finals
(Indonesia) Z Nabawi (Indonesia) F Pasaribu	19	20
7	(Indonesia) A Syahnawi (Indonesia) W O Kandow	21	22

=== Bottom half ===
==== Section 3 ====
First round
(Thailand) P Horbanluekit (Thailand) P Srisawat	21	21
(Japan) Y Eto (Japan) A Kamiyama	19	13
(Chinese Taipei) Chen Y-c (Chinese Taipei) Wu M-c	13	16
8	(Thailand) W Phakjarung (Thailand) O Jongsathapornparn	21	21
(South Korea) Kim Y-h (South Korea) Kim H-r	19	21	21
(Japan) K Kumagai (Japan) An Sato	21	11	18
(Indonesia) R Ramanda (Indonesia) I C S Jamil	18	15
3	(Malaysia) Chan P S (Malaysia) Cheah Y S	21	21

Second round
(Thailand) P Horbanluekit (Thailand) P Srisawat	24	14
8	(Thailand) W Phakjarung (Thailand) O Jongsathapornparn	26	21
(South Korea) Kim Y-h (South Korea) Kim H-r	11	21	24
3	(Malaysia) Chan P S (Malaysia) Cheah Y S	21	16	22

Quarter-finals
8	(Thailand) W Phakjarung (Thailand) O Jongsathapornparn	17	15
(South Korea) Kim Y-h (South Korea) Kim H-r	21	21

==== Section 4 ====
First round
(Indonesia) M Faza (Indonesia) J Rismawardani	21	17	13
(Indonesia) V Y Mulia (Indonesia) P V Elsadai	14	21	21
(Chinese Taipei) Ho W-h (Chinese Taipei) Hsieh M-y	15	9
6	(Indonesia) J Hidayatullah (Indonesia) A Pranata	21	21
(Thailand) P Teeraratsakul (Thailand) P Muenwong	21	10	21
(Thailand) T Viriyangkura (Thailand) A Sapniti	14	21	15

Second round
(Indonesia) V Y Mulia (Indonesia) P V Elsadai	16	16
6	(Indonesia) J Hidayatullah (Indonesia) A Pranata	21	21
(Thailand) P Teeraratsakul (Thailand) P Muenwong	18	21	21
2	(Indonesia) Z J Sumanti (Indonesia) H Julimarbela	21	13	16

Quarter-finals
6	(Indonesia) J Hidayatullah (Indonesia) A Pranata	21	13	21
(Thailand) P Teeraratsakul (Thailand) P Muenwong	19	21	19

Preceded by 2023 Indonesia Masters Super 100 I	Indonesia Masters Super 100	Succeeded by 2024 Indonesia Masters Super 100 I
Preceded by 2023 Denmark Open; 2023 Abu Dhabi Masters	BWF World Tour; 2023 BWF season	Succeeded by 2023 Hylo Open; 2023 Malaysia Super 100
