= Samiya Farooqui =

Indian badminton player

Personal information
- Full name: Samiya Imad Farooqui
- Born: 2 June 2003 (age 23) Hyderabad, India

Sport
- Country: India
- Sport: Badminton
- Handedness: Right

Women's singles
- Highest ranking: 55 (21 August 2024)
- Current ranking: 144 (21 October 2025)
- BWF profile

Samiya Imad Farooqui (born 6 February 2003) is an Indian badminton player.

== Achievements ==
=== BWF World Tour (1 runner-up) ===
The BWF World Tour, which was announced on 19 March 2017 and implemented in 2018, is a series of elite badminton tournaments sanctioned by the Badminton World Federation (BWF). The BWF World Tour is divided into levels of World Tour Finals, Super 1000, Super 750, Super 500, Super 300 (part of the HSBC World Tour), and the BWF Tour Super 100.

Women's singles
Year	Tournament	Level	Opponent	Score	Result
2023	Abu Dhabi Masters	Super 100	(India) Unnati Hooda	16–21, 20–22	(silver) Runner-up

=== BWF International (2 titles, 3 runners-up) ===
Women's singles
Year	Tournament	Opponent	Score	Result
2021	Bulgarian International	(Turkey) Özge Bayrak	16–21, 22–20, 21–11	(gold) Winner
2021	Polish International	(Singapore) Jaslyn Hooi	11–21, 9–21	(silver) Runner-up
2022 (II)	India International Challenge	(India) Tasnim Mir	21–14, 17–21, 11–21	(silver) Runner-up
2023	Guatemala International	(United States) Ishika Jaiswal	21–15, 21–15	(gold) Winner
2023	Dutch Open	(Denmark) Julie Dawall Jakobsen	11–21, 7–21	(silver) Runner-up

BWF International Challenge tournament
BWF International Series tournament
BWF Future Series tournament

=== BWF Junior International (1 title) ===
Girls' singles
Year	Tournament	Opponent	Score	Result
2019	Bulgarian Junior International	(Russia) Anastasiia Shapovalova	9–21, 21–12, 22–20	(gold) Winner

BWF Junior International Grand Prix tournament
BWF Junior International Challenge tournament
BWF Junior International Series tournament
BWF Junior Future Series tournament
