= Mads Christophersen =

Danish badminton player (born 1997)

Personal information
- Born: Mads Christophersen; 24 August 1997 (age 29) Denmark
- Height: 1.78 m (5 ft 10 in)

Sport
- Country: Denmark
- Sport: Badminton
- Handedness: Right

Men's singles
- Highest ranking: 41 (November 2023)
- BWF profile
Medal record
Men's badminton
Representing Denmark
European Men's Team Championships
| Gold medal – first place | 2024 Łódź | Men's team |

Mads Christophersen (born 24 August 1997) is a Danish badminton player.

== Career ==
In January 2018, Mads Christophersen competed in the Swedish Open. In the men's singles final, he was defeated by Siddharth Pratap Singh with a score of 0–2 (15–21, 11–21), finishing as the runner-up.

Mads had to settle for second place in his first BWF championship at the 2021 Orléans Masters after losing to Toma Junior Popov.

In 2024 in Łódź, Mads became part of the Danish men's national badminton team that won the gold medal at the 2024 team badminton championship.

== Achievements ==
=== BWF World Tour (1 title, 1 runners-up) ===
The BWF World Tour, which was announced on 19 March 2017 and implemented in 2018, is a series of elite badminton tournaments sanctioned by the Badminton World Federation (BWF). The BWF World Tour is divided into levels of World Tour Finals, Super 1000, Super 750, Super 500, Super 300, and the BWF Tour Super 100.

Men's singles
| Year | Tournament | Level | Opponent | Score | Result |
|---|---|---|---|---|---|
| 2021 | Orléans Masters | Super 100 | (France) Toma Junior Popov | 21–23, 13–21 | (silver) Runner-up |
| 2023 | Abu Dhabi Masters | Super 100 | (Netherlands) Mark Caljouw | 21–19, 21–15 | (gold) Winner |

=== BWF International Challenge/Series (6 titles, 7 runners-up) ===
Men's singles
| Year | Tournament | Opponent | Score | Result | Ref. |
|---|---|---|---|---|---|
| 2018 | Swedish Open | (India) Siddharth Pratap Singh | 11–21, 15–21 | (silver) Runner-up | |
| 2019 | Dutch International | (India) Harsheel Dani | 21–15, 12–21, 13–21 | (silver) Runner-up | |
| 2019 | Polish International | (Bulgaria) Ivan Rusev | 21–6, 21–14 | (gold) Runner-up | |
| 2021 | Irish Open | (Malaysia) Yeoh Seng Zoe | 18–21, 14–21 | (silver) Runner-up | |
| 2022 | Welsh International | (Czech Republic) Jan Louda | 21–12, 21–18 | (gold) Winner | |
| 2022 | Luxembourg Open | (Denmark) Magnus Johannesen | 14–21, 21–15, 21–13 | (gold) Winner | |
| 2022 | Nantes International | (France) Christo Popov | 21–8, 11–21, 21–14 | (gold) Winner | |
| 2022 | Dutch Open | (France) Christo Popov | 23–25, 10–21 | (silver) Runner-up | |
| 2023 | Scottish Open | (India) Sankar Subramanian | 21–16, 21–14 | (gold) Winner | |
| 2024 | Belgian International | (Belgium) Julien Carraggi | 16–21, 21–12, 19–21 | (silver) Runner-up | |
| 2024 | Dutch Open | (India) Ayush Shetty | 21–10, 21–9 | (gold) Winner | |
| 2026 | Estonian International | (Japan) Minoru Koga | 18–21, 21–11, 12–21 | (silver) Runner-up | |
| 2026 | Swedish Open | (Japan) Minoru Koga | 16–21, 21–16, 18–21 | (silver) Runner-up | |

BWF International Challenge tournament
BWF International Series tournament
