= 2023 Abu Dhabi Masters =

Tournament details
- Dates: 17 – 22 October
- Edition: 1st
- Level: Super 100
- Total prize money: US$120,000
- Venue: ADNEC Marina Hall
- Location: Abu Dhabi, United Arab Emirates

Champions
- Men's singles: (Denmark) Mads Christophersen
- Women's singles: (India) Unnati Hooda
- Men's doubles: (Malaysia) Goh Sze Fei (Malaysia) Nur Izzuddin
- Women's doubles: (India) Tanisha Crasto (India) Ashwini Ponnappa
- Mixed doubles: (Denmark) Mads Vestergaard (Denmark) Christine Busch

The 2023 Abu Dhabi Masters was a badminton tournament which took place at the ADNEC Marina Hall in Abu Dhabi, United Arab Emirates, from 17 to 22 October 2023 and had a total prize of US$120,000.

== Tournament ==
The 2023 Abu Dhabi Masters was the twenty-sixth tournament according to the 2023 BWF World Tour. It was the inaugural edition of the Abu Dhabi Masters. This tournament was organized by 316 sport services In association with the UAE Badminton Federation with sanction from the BWF.

=== Venue ===
This tournament was held at the ADNEC Marina Hall in Abu Dhabi, United Arab Emitates.

=== Point distribution ===
Below is the point distribution table for each phase of the tournament based on the BWF points system for the BWF Tour Super 100 event.

Winner	Runner-up	3/4	5/8	9/16	17/32	33/64	65/128	129/256
5,500	4,680	3,850	3,030	2,110	1,290	510	240	100

=== Prize money ===
The total prize money for this tournament was US$120,000. Distribution of prize money was in accordance with BWF regulations.

Event	Winner	Finals	Semi-finals	Quarter-finals	Last 16
Singles	$9,000	$4,560	$1,740	$720	$420
Doubles	$9,480	$4,560	$1,680	$870	$450

== Men's singles ==
=== Seeds ===
1. (India) Kiran George (semi-finals)
2. (France) Arnaud Merklé (quarter-finals)
3. (France) Alex Lanier (quarter-finals)
4. (India) Mithun Manjunath (second round)
5. (Finland) Kalle Koljonen (third round)
6. (Denmark) Mads Christophersen (champion)
7. (Netherlands) Mark Caljouw (final)
8. (Chinese Taipei) Huang Yu-kai (third round)

=== Finals ===
Semi-finals
1	(India) Kiran George	13	21
7	(Netherlands) Mark Caljouw	21	23
6	(Denmark) Mads Christophersen	21	21
(India) Raghu Mariswamy	9	14

Final
7	(Netherlands) Mark Caljouw	19	15
6	(Denmark) Mads Christophersen	21	21

=== Top half ===
==== Section 1 ====
First round
(England) H Huang	17	20
(Austria) C V Filimon	21	22
Q4	(Thailand) N Pusri	21	21
(Egypt) A H Elgamal	14	5
Q5	(India) S Salar	8	17
Q1	(United States) Ye BH	21	21
Q2	(Sri Lanka) A Herath	11	12
(Germany) K Schäfer	21	21

Second round
1	(India) K George	21	21
(Austria) C V Filimon	16	14
(Germany) M Weißkirchen	21	21
Q4	(Thailand) N Pusri	13	7
5	(Finland) K Koljonen	21	21
Q1	(United States) Ye BH	17	9
(Vietnam) Lê Đ P	21	14	21
(Germany) K Schäfer	19	21	15

Third round
1	(India) K George	21	21
(Germany) M Weißkirchen	12	12
5	(Finland) K Koljonen	21	19	19
(Vietnam) Lê Đ P	10	21	21

Quarter-finals
1	(India) K George	21	21
(Vietnam) Lê Đ P	12	18

==== Section 2 ====
First round
(Germany) S Hsiao	18	20
(India) S Karunakaran	21	22
PFQ	(Bahrain) A Ebrahim	16	8
(Kazakhstan) D Panarin	21	21
(Thailand) K Laotrakul	21	21
(Norway) M Barth	17	8
(Switzerland) T Künzi	21	21
(United Arab Emirates) S Romdhani	15	14

Second round
4	(India) M Manjunath	17	21	12
(India) S Karunakaran	21	12	21
(India) R Sanjeevi	15	21	21
(Kazakhstan) D Panarin	21	19	13
7	(Netherlands) M Caljouw	21	21
(Thailand) K Laotrakul	17	19
Q6	(India) V Vasudevan	22	21
(Switzerland) T Künzi	20	14

Third round
(India) S Karunakaran	21	21
(India) R Sanjeevi	13	19
7	(Netherlands) M Caljouw	12	21	21
Q6	(India) V Vasudevan	21	14	10

Quarter-finals
(India) S Karunakaran	21	14	12
7	(Netherlands) M Caljouw	17	21	21

=== Bottom half ===
==== Section 3 ====
First round
(Spain) P Abián	21	12	13
(Finland) J Oldorff	13	21	21
(India) K K Mekala	17	14
(Canada) XD Sheng	21	21
PFQ	(Portugal) B Carvalho	8	15
(India) A Yeligar	21	21
Q8	(India) R Raghvender	14	6
(Spain) L E Peñalver	21	21

Second round
(Finland) J Oldorff	21	13	13
(Germany) F Roth	17	21	21
(Canada) XD Sheng	18	11
6	(Denmark) M Christophersen	21	21
(India) A Yeligar	21	21
(India) H M Gowda	11	16
(Spain) L E Peñalver	13	10
3	(France) A Lanier	21	21

Third round
(Germany) F Roth	21	12	12
6	(Denmark) M Christophersen	18	21	21
(India) A Yeligar	11	12
3	(France) A Lanier	21	21

Quarter-finals
6	(Denmark) M Christophersen	21	17	21
3	(France) A Lanier	14	21	13

==== Section 4 ====
First round
(Canada) B. R. Sankeerth	21	16	15
(India) R Mariswamy	15	21	21
Q7	(United Arab Emirates) M Munawar	20	21	16
(Ukraine) D Bosniuk	22	18	21
(India) H Aggarwal	10	0^{r}
(Denmark) K R Rajarajan	21	4
(India) S Subramanian	21	22
PFQ	(England) E L Ngan	15	20

Second round
(India) R Mariswamy	21	21
Q3	(Denmark) D Kim	18	16
(Ukraine) D Bosniuk	10	19
8	(Chinese Taipei) Huang Y-k	21	21
(Denmark) K R Rajarajan	21	16	21
(United States) K A Walter	18	21	11
(India) S Subramanian	23	14
2	(France) A Merklé	25	21

Third round
(India) R Mariswamy	21	21
8	(Chinese Taipei) Huang Y-k	19	17
(Denmark) K R Rajarajan	9	14
2	(France) A Merklé	21	21

Quarter-finals
(India) R Mariswamy	21	21
2	(France) A Merklé	14	19

== Women's singles ==
=== Seeds ===
1. (Myanmar) Thet Htar Thuzar (semi-finals)
2. (India) Malvika Bansod (withdrew)
3. (Switzerland) Jenjira Stadelmann (second round)
4. (Malaysia) Kisona Selvaduray (second round)
5. (Ukraine) Polina Buhrova (first round)
6. (Denmark) Julie Dawall Jakobsen (semi-finals)
7. (Hungary) Vivien Sándorházi (first found)
8. (Republic of Ireland) Rachael Darragh (quarter-finals)

=== Finals ===
Semi-finals
1	(Myanmar) Thet Htar Thuzar	18	12
(India) Unnati Hooda	21	21
6	(Denmark) Julie Dawall Jakobsen	9	21	17
(India) Samiya Imad Farooqui	21	19	21

Final
(India) Unnati Hooda	21	22
(India) Samiya Imad Farooqui	16	20

=== Top half ===
==== Section 1 ====
First round
1	(Myanmar) Thet Htar T	21	21
Q2	(United Arab Emirates) S D Gurav	14	11
(Slovakia) K Vargová	21	17	21
(Luxembourg) K Schmidt	16	21	23
7	(Hungary) V Sándorházi	14	5
PFQ	(India) S Valishetty	21	21
(Denmark) A Schulz	18	21	21
(Malaysia) K Radhakrishnan	21	14	16

Second round
1	(Myanmar) Thet Htar T	21	21
(Luxembourg) K Schmidt	8	8
PFQ	(India) S Valishetty	21	17	22
(Denmark) A Schulz	17	21	20

Quarter-finals
1	(Myanmar) Thet Htar T	21	21
PFQ	(India) S Valishetty	14	14

==== Section 2 ====
First round
4	(Malaysia) Kisona S	21	21
(United Arab Emirates) N R Azzahra	12	14
(India) U Hooda	21	21
(Uganda) F Mohamed Rafi	9	8
5	(Ukraine) P Buhrova	9	21	21
(India) M Singh	21	16	23
(Bulgaria) H Popovska	17	15
Q1	(England) F Redfearn	21	21

Second round
4	(Malaysia) Kisona S	16	17
(India) U Hooda	21	21
(India) M Singh	18	21	15
Q1	(England) F Redfearn	21	9	21

Quarter-finals
(India) U Hooda	21	21
Q1	(England) F Redfearn	9	15

=== Bottom half ===
==== Section 3 ====
First round
(Italy) Y Hamza	21	20	23
(United States) D Gupta	18	22	25
Q4	(Poland) W Górniak	13	15
6	(Denmark) J D Jakobsen	21	21
(Bulgaria) K Nalbantova	20	21	22
(India) Gadde R S	22	12	20
PFQ	(Czech Republic) V Dobiásvá	12	11
3	(Switzerland) J Stadelmann	21	21

Second round
(United States) D Gupta	11	16
6	(Denmark) J D Jakobsen	21	21
(Bulgaria) K Nalbantova	21	21
3	(Switzerland) J Stadelmann	15	12

Quarter-finals
6	(Denmark) J D Jakobsen	21	21
(Bulgaria) K Nalbantova	18	10

==== Section 4 ====
First round
Q3	(Netherlands) J Laurens	21	21
(Mexico) S Solis	15	7
(Egypt) D Hany	14	14
8	(Republic of Ireland) R Darragh	21	21
(India) Samiya I F	21	21
(Czech Republic) T Švábíková	17	18
(Hungary) Á Kőrösi	13	12
PFQ	(India) A Variyath	21	21

Second round
Q3	(Netherlands) J Laurens	19	12
8	(Republic of Ireland) R Darragh	21	21
(India) Samiya I F	13	21	21
PFQ	(India) A Variyath	21	19	13

Quarter-finals
8	(Republic of Ireland) R Darragh	11	9
(India) Samiya I F	21	21

== Men's doubles ==
=== Seeds ===
1. (Malaysia) Goh Sze Fei / Nur Izzuddin (champions)
2. (India) Krishna Prasad Garaga / Vishnuvardhan Goud Panjala (quarter-finals)
3. (Thailand) Pharanyu Kaosamaang / Worrapol Thongsa-nga (final)
4. (Scotland) Christopher Grimley / Matthew Grimley (quarter-finals)
5. (Germany) Bjarne Geiss / Jan Colin Völker (quarter-finals)
6. (Republic of Ireland) Joshua Magee / Paul Reynolds (second round)
7. (England) Rory Easton / Zach Russ (first round)
8. (Denmark) Daniel Lundgaard / Mads Vestergaard (semi-finals)

=== Finals ===
Semi-finals
1	(Malaysia) Goh Sze Fei (Malaysia) Nur Izzuddin	23	21
8	(Denmark) Daniel Lundgaard (Denmark) Mads Vestergaard	21	12
3	(Thailand) Pharanyu Kaosamaang (Thailand) Worrapol Thongsa-nga	21	21
(Netherlands) Ruben Jille (France) Julien Maio	17	17

Final
1	(Malaysia) Goh Sze Fei (Malaysia) Nur Izzuddin	18	21	21
3	(Thailand) Pharanyu Kaosamaang (Thailand) Worrapol Thongsa-nga	21	17	12

=== Top half ===
==== Section 1 ====
First round
(United Arab Emirates) D Padmakumar (United Arab Emirates) A Pavikumar	6	13
(England) C Hemming (England) Et van Leeuwen	21	21
5	(Germany) B Geiss (Germany) J C Völker	21	21
(Germany) D Hess (Germany) P Scheiel	15	12
(Denmark) M Gadegaard (Denmark) O Geisler	9	13
(France) É Adam (France) L Rossi	21	21

Second round
1	(Malaysia) Goh S F (Malaysia) N Izzuddin	21	21
(England) C Hemming (England) Et van Leeuwen	10	19
5	(Germany) B Geiss (Germany) J C Völker	21	18	21
(France) É Adam (France) L Rossi	19	21	15

Quarter-finals
1	(Malaysia) Goh S F (Malaysia) N Izzuddin	21	21
5	(Germany) B Geiss (Germany) J C Völker	17	16

==== Section 2 ====
First round
4	(Scotland) C Grimley (Scotland) M Grimley	21	21
(United Arab Emirates) Kuswanto (United Arab Emirates) A Satheerthan	7	15
(Iran) M M Mirshekari (Iran) S Sangtarash	19	15
(United Arab Emirates) De Ayyappan (United Arab Emirates) Dh Ayyappan	21	21
8	(Denmark) D Lundgaard (Denmark) M Vestergaard	21	21
(England) K L Chun (England) R Webster	3	5
(Denmark) W K Boe (Denmark) C F Kjær	w	/	o
(India) P. S. Ravikrishna (India) S P Udayakumar

Second round
4	(Scotland) C Grimley (Scotland) M Grimley	'21	21
(United Arab Emirates) De Ayyappan (United Arab Emirates) Dh Ayyappan	9	17
8	(Denmark) D Lundgaard (Denmark) M Vestergaard	21	22
(Denmark) W K Boe (Denmark) C F Kjær	18	20

Quarter-finals
4	(Scotland) C Grimley (Scotland) M Grimley	14	14
8	(Denmark) D Lundgaard (Denmark) M Vestergaard	21	21

=== Bottom half ===
==== Section 3 ====
First round
(India) P Raj (India) H Thandranhi	21	21
(United Arab Emirates) A Annan (United Arab Emirates) R Marath	9	19
(Bulgaria) I Rusev (Bulgaria) I Stoynov	11	23
6	(Republic of Ireland) J Magee (Republic of Ireland) P Reynolds	21	25
(United Arab Emirates) R Kalidasan (United Arab Emirates) A Menon
(Bahrain) M Muanis (United Arab Emirates) M Munawar	w	/	o
(United Arab Emirates) V Kuruvath (United Arab Emirates) S Unni
3	(Thailand) P Kaosamaang (Thailand) W Thongsa-nga	w	/	o

Second round
(India) P Raj (India) H Thandranhi	21	21
6	(Republic of Ireland) J Magee (Republic of Ireland) P Reynolds	17	7
(Bahrain) M Muanis (United Arab Emirates) M Munawar	17	9
3	(Thailand) P Kaosamaang (Thailand) W Thongsa-nga	21	21

Quarter-finals
(India) P Raj (India) H Thandranhi	16	8
3	(Thailand) P Kaosamaang (Thailand) W Thongsa-nga	21	21

==== Section 4 ====
First round
(United Arab Emirates) E P Achyut (United Arab Emirates) A Basheer	11	12
(Denmark) A Søndergaard (Denmark) J Toft	21	21
(Netherlands) R Jille (France) J Maio	21	27	21
7	(England) R Easton (England) Z Russ	12	29	18
(India) V Annadurai (India) N P Eswaramoorthy	21	21
(United Arab Emirates) N Thunga (United Arab Emirates) V Vijayakumar	6	7

Second round
(Denmark) A Søndergaard (Denmark) J Toft	13	21	13
(Netherlands) R Jille (France) J Maio	21	17	21
(India) V Annadurai (India) N P Eswaramoorthy	10	16
2	(India) K P Garaga (India) V G Panjala	21	21

Quarter-finals
(Netherlands) R Jille (France) J Maio	22	19	21
2	(India) K P Garaga (India) V G Panjala	20	21	14

== Women's doubles ==
=== Seeds ===
1. (India) Tanisha Crasto / Ashwini Ponnappa (champions)
2. (Germany) Stine Küspert / Emma Moszczynski (semi-finals)

=== Results ===
First round
(India) N S Reddy (India) A S Sunil	21	21
(Sweden) M Sjöö (Sweden) T Sjöö	9	19
(United Arab Emirates) S D Gurav (United Arab Emirates) T Khan	19	22	14
(United Arab Emirates) A Qathun (United Arab Emirates) N Rajesh	21	20	21
(Czech Republic) V Brožkovcová (Czech Republic) V Dobiášová	12	13
(England) L Tolman (England) Es van Leeuwen	21	21

Quarter-finals
1	(India) T Crasto (India) A Ponnappa	21	21
(United Arab Emirates) F Alhajji (United Arab Emirates) G A Altahri	3	3
(India) P Arora (India) U Hooda	16	20
(India) N S Reddy (India) A S Sunil	21	22
(United Arab Emirates) A Qathun (United Arab Emirates) N Rajesh	5	10
(Denmark) J Finne-Ipsen (Denmark) M Surrow	21	21
(England) L Tolman (England) Es van Leeuwen	19	12
2	(Germany) S Küspert (Germany) E Moszczynski	21	21

Semi-finals
1	(India) Tanisha Crasto (India) Ashwini Ponnappa	21	21
(India) N. Sikki Reddy (India) Arathi Sara Sunil	12	18
(Denmark) Julie Finne-Ipsen (Denmark) Mai Surrow	16	21	21
2	(Germany) Stine Küspert (Germany) Emma Moszczynski	21	11	18

Final
1	(India) Tanisha Crasto (India) Ashwini Ponnappa	21	16	21
(Denmark) Julie Finne-Ipsen (Denmark) Mai Surrow	16	21	8

== Mixed doubles ==
=== Seeds ===
1. (Singapore) Terry Hee / Jessica Tan (final)
2. (India) Rohan Kapoor / N. Sikki Reddy (withdrew)
3. (Thailand) Ruttanapak Oupthong / Jhenicha Sudjaipraparat (quarter-finals)
4. (Denmark) Mads Vestergaard / Christine Busch (champions)
5. (Denmark) Jesper Toft / Clara Graversen (quarter-finals)
6. (Germany) Jan Colin Völker / Stine Küspert (semi-finals)
7. (India) B. Sumeeth Reddy / Ashwini Ponnappa (quarter-finals)
8. (Germany) Patrick Scheiel / Franziska Volkmann (quarter-finals)

=== Finals ===
Semi-finals
1	(Singapore) Terry Hee (Singapore) Jessica Tan	15	21	22
6	(Germany) Jan Colin Völker (Germany) Stine Küspert	21	17	20
4	(Denmark) Mads Vestergaard (Denmark) Christine Busch	21	22
(Denmark) Andreas Søndergaard (Denmark) Iben Bergstein	19	20

Final
1	(Singapore) Terry Hee (Singapore) Jessica Tan	22	17	18
4	(Denmark) Mads Vestergaard (Denmark) Christine Busch	20	21	21

=== Top half ===
==== Section 1 ====
First round

Second round
1	(Singapore) T Hee (Singapore) J Tan	21	21
(India) T Kona (India) S K P Kudaravalli	9	13
8	(Germany) P Scheiel (Germany) F Volkmann	17	21	21
(United Arab Emirates) Kuswanto (United Arab Emirates) S Sreejith Parol	21	18	12

Quarter-finals
1	(Singapore) T Hee (Singapore) J Tan	21	21
8	(Germany) P Scheiel (Germany) F Volkmann	15	8

==== Section 2 ====
First round

Second round
3	(Thailand) R Oupthong (Thailand) J Sudjaipraparat	21	21
(India) S Karunakaran (India) A Variyath	15	18
6	(Germany) J C Völker (Germany) S Küspert	21	21
(Egypt) A H Elgamal (Egypt) D Hany	14	5

Quarter-finals
3	(Thailand) R Oupthong (Thailand) J Sudjaipraparat	19	22
6	(Germany) J C Völker (Germany) S Küspert	21	24

=== Bottom half ===
==== Section 3 ====
First round
(Denmark) O Geisler (Denmark) M Surrow	w	/	o
(Republic of Ireland) J Magee (Republic of Ireland) M Ryan

Second round
(Denmark) O Geisler (Denmark) M Surrow	9	16
5	(Denmark) J Toft (Denmark) C Graversen	21	21
(Germany) C Devereux (Germany) D Toepffer	4	9
4	(Denmark) M Vestergaard (Denmark) C Busch	21	21

Quarter-finals
5	(Denmark) J Toft (Denmark) C Graversen	16	10
4	(Denmark) M Vestergaard (Denmark) C Busch	21	21

==== Section 4 ====
First round

Second round
(England) C Hemming (England) Es van Leeuwen	21	17	16
7	(India) B S Reddy (India) A Ponnappa	11	21	21
(Denmark) A Søndergaard (Denmark) I Bergstein	w	/	o
2	(India) R Kapoor (India) N S Reddy

Quarter-finals
7	(India) B S Reddy (India) A Ponnappa	10	18
(Denmark) A Søndergaard (Denmark) I Bergstein	21	21

Preceded by 2023 Arctic Open	BWF World Tour; 2023 BWF season	Succeeded by 2023 French Open; 2023 Indonesia Masters Super 100 II
