= Jessica Tan (badminton) =

Singaporean badminton player

Jessica Tan Wei Han 陳薇涵
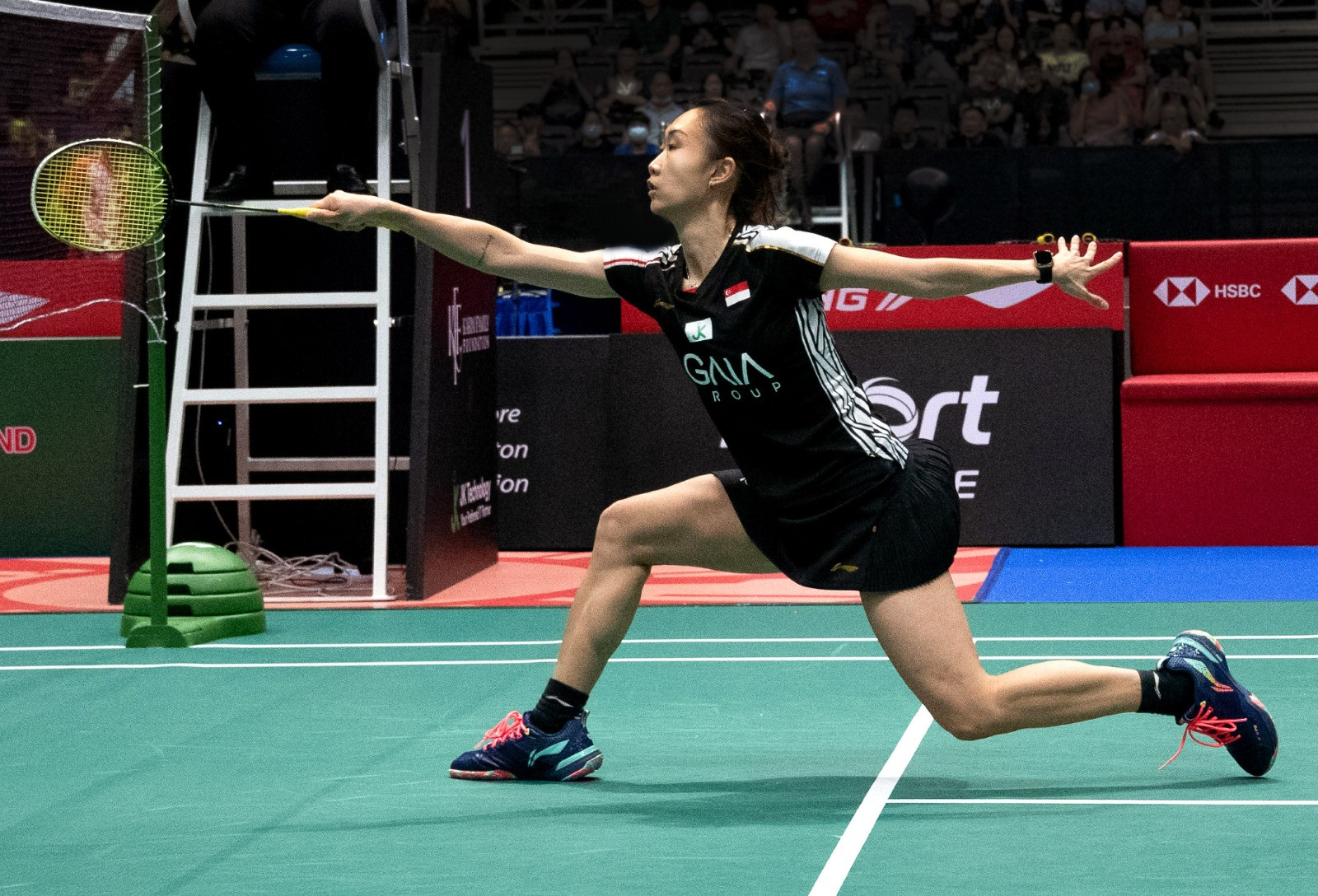
- Tan at the 2023 Singapore Open

Personal information
- Born: Jessica Tan Wei Han; 16 July 1993 (age 33) Singapore
- Height: 1.67 m (5 ft 6 in)
- Weight: 52 kg (115 lb)

Sport
- Country: Singapore
- Sport: Badminton
- Handedness: Right
- Retired: 11 April 2025

Women's & mixed doubles
- Highest ranking: 93 (WD with Dellis Yuliana 4 December 2014); 13 (XD with Terry Hee 3 January 2023)
- BWF profile
Medal record
Women's badminton
Representing Singapore
Commonwealth Games
Gold medal – first place	2022 Birmingham	Mixed doubles
Bronze medal – third place	2022 Birmingham	Mixed team
SEA Games
Bronze medal – third place	2015 Singapore	Women's team
Bronze medal – third place	2017 Kuala Lumpur	Women's team
Bronze medal – third place	2019 Philippines	Women's team
Bronze medal – third place	2021 Vietnam	Women's team
Bronze medal – third place	2023 Cambodia	Women's team

Jessica Tan Wei Han (Note: simplified Chinese: 陈薇涵; traditional Chinese: 陳薇涵.; In this Chinese name, the family name is Tan. In accordance with custom, the Western-style name is Jessica Tan and the Chinese-style name is Tan Wei Han.) (born 16 July 1993) is a Singaporean former national badminton player. Together with Terry Hee, they won their first BWF World Tour title as a duo at the 2022 India Open. Tan along with Hee also won the gold medal in the mixed doubles event at the 2022 Commonwealth Games, a first for Singapore in that discipline at the Games. Jessica Tan and her husband Terry Hee were nominated for the Straits Times Singaporean of the Year Award 2022. Terry Hee and Jessica Tan are Singapore's first local-born mixed doubles duo to qualify for the Olympics, and made their debut at the Paris Olympics 2024. On 11 April 2025, she announced her retirement from badminton due to injuries and to pursue her studies in sports management.

== Early life ==
Tan was born on 16 July 1993 in Singapore, to parents Richard and Joyce. She has two elder sisters who were former national team players. Growing up in a badminton-crazy family, Tan picked up the sport at the age of seven after watching her sisters play. With the intention to compete full time, she withdrew from her placing at Nanyang Technological University (NTU) and joined the national team at the age of 18 to pursue her badminton dream.

== Career ==
=== 2014–2021: SEA Games bronzes, national title ===
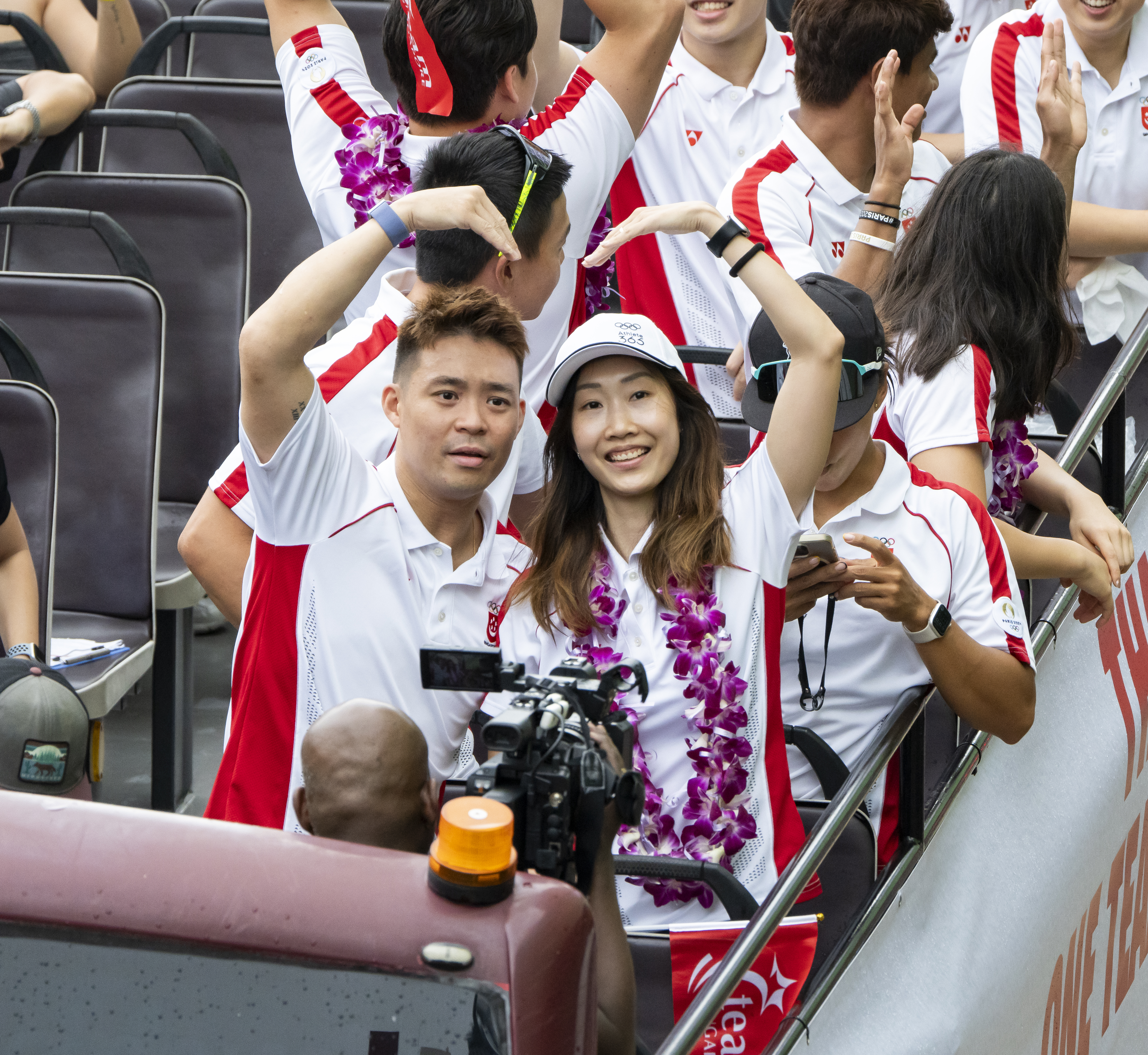
Hee and Tan with other Singapore Olympians during an open-top bus parade in 2024

Tan won her first senior title at the 2014 Singapore International tournament in the mixed doubles event partnered with Terry Hee. Tan was part of the national team that won the women's team bronze medals at the 2015, 2017, 2019 and 2021 SEA Games. In April of 2017, Tan reached a career-high ranking of 15 with Hee. She competed at the 2018 Commonwealth Games in Gold Coast, Australia. Tan then split up with Hee, as he had to undergo his mandatory 2-year national service in 2019. Tan then won the mixed doubles national championships with her partner, Danny Bawa Chrisnanta.

=== 2022: First World Tour Super 500 title, Commonwealth Games success ===
In January, Tan won her first Super 500 title with Hee, at the India Open, defeating the Malaysian pairing of Chen Tang Jie and Peck Yen Wei in the final, 21–15, 21–18 in straight games. In March, Tan won her second BWF World Tour title with Hee, the Orléans Masters, defeating Rehan Naufal Kusharjanto and Lisa Ayu Kusumawati in the final, 21–12, 16–21, 21–13 in rubber games, winning their third title as a married couple.

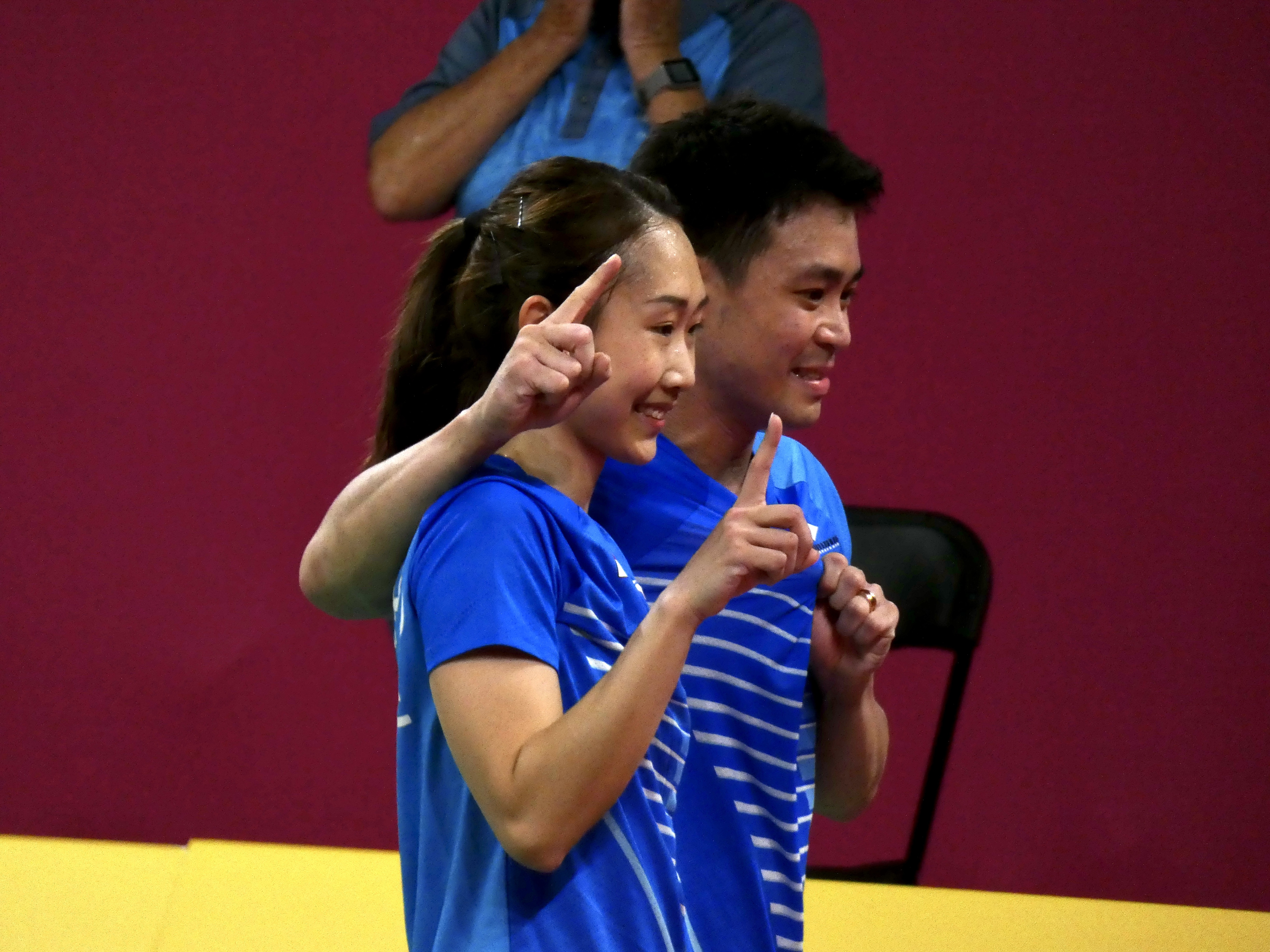
Hee and Tan after winning the mixed doubles final at the 2022 Commonwealth Games in Birmingham, England

At the 2022 Commonwealth Games in August, Tan was part of the Singaporean team who won the bronze medal in the mixed team events as the Singaporean team defeated England 3–0 at the bronze medal playoff. Tan had also competed at the individual mixed doubles event with her husband Hee. Their opponents in the final were England's Marcus Ellis and Lauren Smith, who were playing on home soil and were ranked higher than them. Tan and Hee defeated them in two straight sets, 21–16, 21–15, winning a historic gold medal and Singapore's first Commonwealth Games badminton mixed doubles gold.

=== 2023–2024: Roller coaster journey to Paris Olympics ===
After crowning as the Commonwealth Games mixed-double champion in 2022, the forms of Hee and Tan dipped. The duo suffered early-round exits in their subsequent tournaments in 2022 and won just three out of nine matches in their first six tournaments of 2023.

The 2024 Paris Olympics qualification period began on May 1, 2023 but a personal tragedy affected their playing with Tan's mother died in February 2023, three months before the Road to Paris qualifying period.

The pair did not give up, even though their chances of qualifying for the Olympics were slim. They won only one of their next nine matches. The turnaround came after they started playing in lower-tier tournaments to boost confidence. They clinched second place in the Abu Dhabi Masters (BWF World Tour 100) in October and won the Iris Open, a BWF international challenge tournament in November. They ended 2023 with another two silverware from BWF World Tour 100 events: winning the Guwahati Masters and making the final of Odisha Masters. The haul of points from these tournaments significantly improved their chance to qualify for the Olympics.

In 2024, Hee and Tan started the year strong by making it into the semi-final of Malaysia Open, a BWF World Tour 1000 event. However, since then, second-round appearances were their best in all subsequent tournaments until the end of the 2024 Paris Olympics qualification period. They ranked 18th on the BWF Race to Paris rankings on April 30, 2024, and thus missed out on the automatic qualification spots. There were only 16 slots for the doubles at the Paris Olympics. Only the first 13 eligible pairs were allocated slots via the Race to Paris rankings, while the remaining three spots were given to the continental champions of America, Africa and Oceania.

Fortunately, Hee and Tan received a lifeline after Australia, which had qualified in four badminton events, elected to take up the slots in the women’s singles and women’s doubles, thus freeing up a mixed doubles spot for Hee and Tan, the next eligible pair in the rankings. They became the first local-born mixed doubles duo from Singapore to qualify for the Olympic Games. In the badminton mixed-double events in the 2024 Paris Olympics, Hee and Tan were assigned to Group D together with Feng Yanzhe / Huang Dongping of China (2nd seed), Chen Tang Jie / Toh Ee Wei from Malaysia, and the American pair of Vinson Chiu / Jennie Gai. Hee and Tan played Chen and Toh in the opening match but lost 23–21 and 21–12. Up against China’s world no. 2 pair Feng and Huang next, the duo could not overcome their rivals, losing 21-13, 21-17, thus missing out on the quarter-finals Hee and Tan ended their Olympics campaign with a win though as they beat United States’ Chiu and Gai, 21–17, 21–12 in the last group fixture.

=== 2024–2025: Post-Olympics to retirement ===
Post-Olympics, Tan and Hee continued to compete in major World Tour tournaments, but all ended in 1st-round exits. While competing in the Macau Open, where they were seeded second, their campaign was abruptly halted in the first round against Ye Hong Wei and Nicole Chan (Chinese Taipei). Tan suffered a hamstring injury during the second set, and the duo had to retire.

It was announced in November 2024 that Hee would form a new partnership with Jin Yujia, as Tan had not fully recovered from her injuries and was not sufficiently competition-fit. Finally, Tan announced her retirement from competitive badminton on 11 April 2025, citing injuries and the decision to pursue her studies in sports management.

== Personal life ==
Tan has been married to fellow Singaporean shuttler Terry Hee since 2021, who she had often partnered with at mixed doubles tournaments since the start of her professional career. Their victory at the 2021 Czech Open, defeating Russians Lev Barinov and Anastasiia Boiarun, was their first tournament as a married duo. They were made HSBC Life Singapore's first brand ambassadors in 2023. In 2024, Singlife committed to a sponsorship deal with the couple upon their Olympic qualification.

Tan received spexEducation Undergraduate Scholarship under the New Career track in 2025 to complete her Sports Management degree at the University of Bath in England.

== Awards and nominations ==
Tan and Terry Hee were nominated for the 2022 ST Athlete of the Year Award. They were also conferred the Team of the Year (Event) award in the Singapore Sports Awards 2023 by the Singapore National Olympic Council.

== Achievements ==
=== Commonwealth Games ===
Mixed doubles
Year	Venue	Partner	Opponent	Score	Result
2022	National Exhibition Centre; Birmingham, England	(Singapore) Terry Hee	(England) Marcus Ellis (England) Lauren Smith	21–16, 21–15	Gold

=== BWF World Tour (3 titles, 2 runners-up) ===
The BWF World Tour, which was announced on 19 March 2017 and implemented in 2018, is a series of elite badminton tournaments sanctioned by the Badminton World Federation (BWF). The BWF World Tours are divided into levels of World Tour Finals, Super 1000, Super 750, Super 500, Super 300 (part of the HSBC World Tour), and the BWF Tour Super 100.

Mixed doubles
Year	Tournament	Level	Partner	Opponent	Score	Result
2022	India Open	Super 500	(Singapore) Terry Hee	(Malaysia) Chen Tang Jie (Malaysia) Peck Yen Wei	21–15, 21–18	(gold) Winner
2022	Orléans Masters	Super 100	(Singapore) Terry Hee	(Indonesia) Rehan Naufal Kusharjanto (Indonesia) Lisa Ayu Kusumawati	21–12, 16–21, 21–13	(gold) Winner
2023	Abu Dhabi Masters	Super 100	(Singapore) Terry Hee	(Denmark) Mads Vestergaard (Denmark) Christine Busch	22–20, 17–21, 18–21	(silver) Runner-up
2023	Guwahati Masters	Super 100	(Singapore) Terry Hee	(Denmark) Mads Vestergaard (Denmark) Christine Busch	21–19, 21–11	(gold) Winner
2023	Odisha Masters	Super 100	(Singapore) Terry Hee	(India) Dhruv Kapila (India) Tanisha Crasto	21–17, 19–21, 21–23	(silver) Runner-up

=== BWF International Challenge/Series (9 titles, 2 runners-up) ===
Mixed doubles
Year	Tournament	Partner	Opponent	Score	Result
2014	Singapore International	(Singapore) Terry Hee	(Singapore) Loh Kean Hean (Singapore) Dellis Yuliana	21–19, 19–21, 21–14	(gold) Winner
2014	Malaysia International	(Singapore) Terry Hee	(Indonesia) Hafiz Faizal (Indonesia) Shella Devi Aulia	21–19, 19–21, 18–21	(silver) Runner-up
2015	Bangladesh International	(Singapore) Terry Hee	(Malaysia) Tan Wee Gieen (Malaysia) Shevon Jemie Lai	21–10, 19–21, 21–12	(gold) Winner
2016	Smiling Fish International	(Singapore) Terry Hee	(Malaysia) Wong Fai Yin (Malaysia) Shevon Jemie Lai	21–16, 21–17	(gold) Winner
2016	Hungarian International	(Singapore) Terry Hee	(Poland) Paweł Pietryja (Poland) Aneta Wojtkowska	11–6, 11–7, 13–11	(gold) Winner
2018	Turkey International	(Singapore) Danny Bawa Chrisnanta	(Indonesia) Leo Rolly Carnando (Indonesia) Indah Cahya Sari Jamil	21–19, 16–21, 21–12	(gold) Winner
2019	Estonian International	(Singapore) Danny Bawa Chrisnanta	(England) Gregory Mairs (England) Victoria Williams	21–18, 14–21, 21–15	(gold) Winner
2019	Swedish Open	(Singapore) Danny Bawa Chrisnanta	(Denmark) Mikkel Mikkelsen (Denmark) Mai Surrow	21–14, 21–16	(gold) Winner
2019	Austrian Open	(Singapore) Danny Bawa Chrisnanta	(Netherlands) Robin Tabeling (Netherlands) Selena Piek	21–19, 16–21, 12–21	(silver) Runner-up
2021	Czech Open	(Singapore) Terry Hee	(Russia) Lev Barinov (Russia) Anastasiia Boiarun	21–18, 21–12	(gold) Winner
2023	Irish Open	(Singapore) Terry Hee	(England) Gregory Mairs (England) Jenny Mairs	21–17, 18–21, 21–15	(gold) Winner

BWF International Challenge tournament
BWF International Series tournament
