= Egypt International =

Badminton championships

The Egypt International is an international badminton tournament held in Cairo, Egypt. The event is part of the Badminton World Federation's Future Series and part of the Badminton Confederation of Africa's Circuit.

== Past winners ==
Year	Men's singles	Women's singles	Men's doubles	Women's doubles	Mixed doubles	Ref
2015	(Uganda) Edwin Ekiring	(Egypt) Hadia Hosny	(Malaysia) Misbun Shawal Misbun (Malaysia) Ridzwan Rahmat	(Egypt) Doha Hany (Egypt) Hadia Hosny	(Egypt) Ahmed Salah (Egypt) Menna El-Tanany	
2016	(Czech Republic) Milan Ludík	(Lithuania) Gerda Voitechovskaja	(France) Vanmael Hériau (France) Florent Riancho	(Belarus) Kristina Silich (Lithuania) Gerda Voitechovskaja	(Egypt) Ahmed Salah (Egypt) Menna El-Tanany	
2017	(England) Sam Parsons	(Turkey) Aliye Demirbağ	(Malaysia) Yogendran Khrishnan (Germany) Jonathan Persson	(Belarus) Anastasiya Cherniavskaya (Belarus) Alesia Zaitsava	(Malaysia) Yogendran Khrishnan (India) Prajakta Sawant	
2018	(Azerbaijan) Ade Resky Dwicahyo	(Myanmar) Thet Htar Thuzar	(Azerbaijan) Ade Resky Dwicahyo (Azerbaijan) Azmy Qowimuramadhoni	(India) Pooja Dandu (India) Sanjana Santosh	(Switzerland) Oliver Schaller (Switzerland) Céline Burkart	
2019	(Azerbaijan) Ade Resky Dwicahyo	(Myanmar) Thet Htar Thuzar	(Algeria) Koceila Mammeri (Algeria) Youcef Sabri Medel	(India) Simran Singhi (India) Ritika Thaker	(India) Dhruv Rawat (India) Kuhoo Garg	
2020	Cancelled (Note: This tournament, originally to be played from 13 to 18 October, was later cancelled due to the COVID-19 pandemic in Egypt.)					
2021	Cancelled (Note: This tournament, originally to be played from 14 to 17 October, was later cancelled due to the COVID-19 pandemic in Egypt.)					
2022	(Germany) Samuel Hsiao	(Hungary) Daniella Gonda	(Thailand) Pharanyu Kaosamaang (Thailand) Worrapol Thongsa-Nga	(Italy) Martina Corsini (Italy) Judith Mair	(Thailand) Ratchapol Makkasasithorn (Thailand) Chasinee Korepap	
2023	(England) Harry Huang	(France) Romane Cloteaux-Foucault	(France) Louis Ducrot (France) Quentin Ronget	(Germany) Julia Meyer (Germany) Leona Michalski	(Germany) Jones Ralfy Jansen (Germany) Julia Meyer	
2024	(India) Raghu Mariswamy	(Bulgaria) Stefani Stoeva	(Thailand) Kittisak Namdash (Thailand) Samatcha Tovannakasem	(Switzerland) Lucie Amiguet (Switzerland) Caroline Racloz	(Algeria) Koceila Mammeri (Algeria) Tanina Mammeri	
2025	(Italy) Giovanni Toti	(India) Meghana Reddy	(Algeria) Koceila Mammeri (Algeria) Youcef Sabri Medel	(Switzerland) Lucie Amiguet (Switzerland) Caroline Racloz	(Algeria) Koceila Mammeri (Algeria) Tanina Mammeri	

== Performances by nation ==
As of the 2025 edition

Pos	Nation	MS	WS	MD	WD	XD	Total
1	India	1	1		2	1.5	5.5
2	Algeria			2		2	4
2	Egypt		1		1	2	4
4	Germany	1		0.5	1	1	3.5
5	Azerbaijan	2		1			3
5	France		1	2			3
5	Switzerland				2	1	3
5	Thailand			2		1	3
9	England	2					2
9	Italy	1			1		2
9	Malaysia			1.5		0.5	2
9	Myanmar		2				2
13	Belarus				1.5		1.5
13	Lithuania		1		0.5		1.5
15	Bulgaria		1				1
15	Czech Republic	1					1
15	Hungary		1				1
15	Turkey		1				1
15	Uganda	1					1
Total		9	9	9	9	9	45
