= Worrapol Thongsa-nga =

Thai badminton player (born 1995)

Personal information
- Born: 29 October 1995 (age 31) Kanchanaburi, Thailand
- Height: 1.73 m (5 ft 8 in)

Sport
- Country: Thailand
- Sport: Badminton
- Handedness: Right

Men's doubles
- Highest ranking: 37 (with Pharanyu Kaosamaang, 20 February 2024)
- Current ranking: 41 (with Chaloempon Charoenkitamorn, 27 October 2026)
- BWF profile
Medal record
Men's badminton
Representing Thailand
Asian Games
Bronze medal – third place	2026 Aichi–Nagoya	Men's team
Asia Mixed Team Championships
Bronze medal – third place	2023 Dubai	Mixed team
Bronze medal – third place	2025 Qingdao	Mixed team

Worrapol Thongsa-nga (Thai: วรพล ทองสง่า; born 29 October 1995) is a Thai badminton player. He won his first international title at the 2022 Egypt International partnered with Pharanyu Kaosamaang.

== Achievements ==
=== BWF World Tour (1 title, 1 runner-up) ===
The BWF World Tour, which was announced on 19 March 2017 and implemented in 2018, is a series of elite badminton tournaments sanctioned by the Badminton World Federation (BWF). The BWF World Tours are divided into levels of World Tour Finals, Super 1000, Super 750, Super 500, Super 300, and the BWF Tour Super 100.

Men's doubles
Year	Tournament	Level	Partner	Opponent	Score	Result
2023	Abu Dhabi Masters	Super 100	(Thailand) Pharanyu Kaosamaang	(Malaysia) Goh Sze Fei (Malaysia) Nur Izzuddin	21–18, 17–21, 12–21	(silver) Runner-up
2024 (I)	Indonesia Masters	Super 100	(Thailand) Chaloempon Charoenkitamorn	(Indonesia) Rahmat Hidayat (Indonesia) Yeremia Rambitan	21–19, 21–15	(gold) Winner

=== BWF International Challenge/Series (4 titles, 1 runner-up) ===
Men's doubles
Year	Tournament	Partner	Opponent	Score	Result
2022	Egypt International	(Thailand) Pharanyu Kaosamaang	(France) Louis Ducrot (France) Romain Frank	21–11, 21–9	(gold) Winner
2022	Czech Open	(Thailand) Pharanyu Kaosamaang	(Chinese Taipei) Chiu Hsiang-chieh (Chinese Taipei) Yang Ming-tse	21–15, 21–15	(gold) Winner
2022	Bahrain International Series	(Thailand) Pharanyu Kaosamaang	(Thailand) Tanadon Punpanich (Thailand) Wachirawit Sothon	16–21, 16–21	(silver) Runner-up
2022	Bangladesh International	(Thailand) Pharanyu Kaosamaang	(Philippines) Christian Bernardo (Philippines) Alvin Morada	18–21, 21–10, 21–19	(gold) Winner
2023	Maldives International	(Thailand) Pharanyu Kaosamaang	(Malaysia) Low Hang Yee (Malaysia) Ng Eng Cheong	21–19, 21–16	(gold) Winner

BWF International Challenge tournament
BWF International Series tournament
