= Nur Izzuddin =

Malaysian badminton player (born 1997)

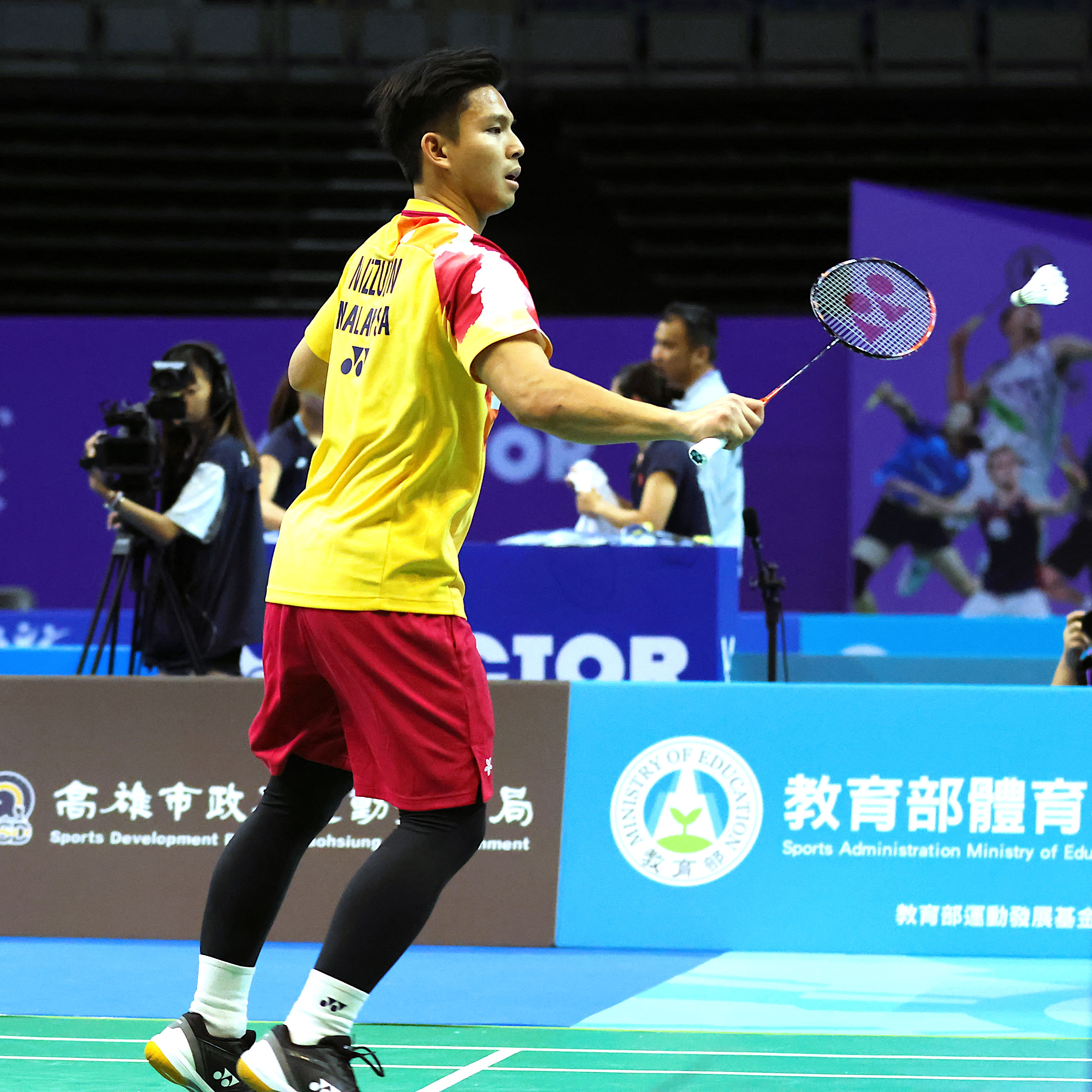
- Izzuddin at the 2023 Kaohsiung Masters

Personal information
- Born: Nur Izzuddin bin Mohd Rumsani; 11 November 1997 (age 29) Muar, Johor, Malaysia
- Height: 1.75 m (5 ft 9 in)
- Spouse: Mawar Mutiara (m. 2023)

Sport
- Country: Malaysia
- Sport: Badminton
- Handedness: Right

Men's doubles
- Highest ranking: 1 (with Goh Sze Fei, 27 May 2025)
- Current ranking: 5 (with Goh Sze Fei, 10 November 2026)
- BWF profile
Medal record
Men's badminton
Representing Malaysia
Thomas Cup
Bronze medal – third place	2024 Chengdu	Men's team
Asian Championships
Silver medal – second place	2024 Ningbo	Men's doubles
Bronze medal – third place	2022 Manila	Men's doubles
Asia Team Championships
Gold medal – first place	2022 Selangor	Men's team
Silver medal – second place	2020 Manila	Men's team
Silver medal – second place	2024 Selangor	Men's team
Bronze medal – third place	2018 Alor Setar	Men's team
SEA Games
Silver medal – second place	2017 Kuala Lumpur	Men's team

Nur Izzuddin bin Mohd Rumsani (born 11 November 1997) is a Malaysian badminton player. A former world number one, Asian championship silver medalist and BWF World Tour Finals runner-up, he and his partner Goh Sze Fei won the men's doubles titles at the 2024 China Open and 2026 Indonesia Open, both BWF World Tour Super 1000 tournaments. The pair reached the world number one ranking on 27 May 2025.

Together with Goh, Izzuddin won a silver medal at the 2024 Asian Championships and a bronze medal at the 2022 Asian Championships. They also finished runners-up at the 2024 BWF World Tour Finals and won the 2022 German Open, 2024 Japan Open, 2024 Arctic Open, 2025 India Open and 2026 Indonesia Masters. Their 2026 Indonesia Open victory marked their second Super 1000 title and ended an 18-year wait for Malaysia to reclaim the men's doubles crown at the tournament, last won by Mohd Fairuzizuan Mohd Tazari and Mohd Zakry Abdul Latif in 2008.

Izzuddin was also part of the Malaysian men's team that won gold at the 2022 Badminton Asia Team Championships, silver medals at the 2020 and 2024 Asian Team Championships, and bronze at the 2024 Thomas Cup. He additionally won a silver medal in the men's team event at the 2017 SEA Games and a bronze medal at the 2018 Asian Team Championships.

== Career ==
In January 2017, Izzuddin and his partner Goh Sze Fei entered their first Grand Prix Gold final at the 2017 Malaysia Masters and finished up as runner-ups.

=== 2022 ===
In March, Izzuddin and Goh won their first BWF World Tour title at the 2022 German Open beating Liu Yuchen and Ou Xuanyi in three games. In the following week, they entered their second consecutive final at the 2022 Swiss Open but lost out to rivals Fajar Alfian and Muhammad Rian Ardianto.

In April, Izzuddin and Goh fell to compatriots Aaron Chia and Soh Wooi Yik at the semi-finals of 2022 Badminton Asia Championships, securing them a bronze medal.

In December, Izzuddin captured the Malaysia International title partnered with Muhammad Haikal.

=== 2023 ===
In January, following their underwhelming results in the past few months, Izzuddin and long-time partner Goh Sze Fei decided to split-up, citing lack of connection and loss of trust. In March, Izzuddin and new partner Muhammad Haikal reached their first BWF World Tour final at the 2023 Ruichang China Masters, but went down to the home pair of Chen Boyang and Liu Yi in rubber game. Around four months after splitting up, Izzuddin and Goh Sze Fei reunited at the end of May. The pair set aside their differences and decided to rekindle their partnership in quest for the 2024 Summer Olympics spot. In July, Izzuddin and Goh competed at the 2023 U.S. Open, their first tournament after reuniting. The pair emerged as winners defeating Chinese Taipei's Lee Fang-chih and Lee Fang-jen in the final. The duo also won the Super 100 event in the Kaohsiung and Abu Dhabi Masters.

=== 2024 ===
Izzuddin started the 2024 season with unsatisfactory results, as he and Goh suffered multiple early rounds defeats in the Asian and European leg. Izzuddin and Goh finally reached the final of the Asian Championships in April, winning the silver medal. Their performance started to improve as evidenced by the results they achieved by reaching the quarter-finals of the Malaysia Masters, Singapore Open, and Indonesia Open. In August, it was reported that the pair had decided to leave the national team, and would officially start their career as independent players in early September. The duo then won the Japan Open in August, China Open in September, and Arctic Open in October.

In December, Izzuddin and Goh finished their 2024 season as the runners-up of the BWF World Tour Finals, losing to Kim Astrup and Anders Skaarup Rasmussen of Denmark in the final with a score of 17–21, 21–17, 11–21. Their achievement elevated them to world number 3, the highest ever ranking in their career. With that, they have become the top Malaysian men's doubles pair, taking over Olympic bronze medalists Aaron Chia and Soh Wooi Yik. That achievement also marks them being the first men's doubles pair in Malaysia to reach the final of the BWF World Tour since its establishment in 2018.

=== 2025 ===
Started the season as world number 2 in the BWF ranking, Izzuddin and Goh snapped their first India Open title by defeating Korean pair of Kim Won-ho and Seo Seung-jae in 3 sets. It was also the first title of the year for the pair. In July, Izzuddin and Goh failed to defend their Japan Open crown the previous year, losing to Kim and Seo in straight sets.

=== 2026 ===
In January, Izzuddin and Goh won their first title in the Indonesia Masters against Raymond Indra and Nikolaus Joaquin of Indonesia. However, they lost their second final at their home ground in Malaysia Masters against the Danish pair of Daniel Lundgaard and Mads Vestergaard. In early June, Izzuddin and Goh ended the 18-year wait for men's doubles champion at the Indonesia Open by defeating the same opponent they faced back in January, Indra and Joaquin. At the BWF World Championships, Izzuddin and Goh advanced to the quarterfinals stage before being knocked out by Kim and Seo in 40 minutes. Two months later, They reached their fourth final of the year where they lost against Man Wei Chong and Tee Kai Wun in an all-Malaysian final at the French Open in three games.

== Achievements ==
=== Asian Championships ===
Men's doubles
Year	Venue	Partner	Opponent	Score	Result	Ref.
2022	Muntinlupa Sports Complex; Metro Manila, Philippines	(Malaysia) Goh Sze Fei	(Malaysia) Aaron Chia (Malaysia) Soh Wooi Yik	13–21, 15–21	Bronze	
2024	Ningbo Olympic Sports Center Gymnasium; Ningbo, China	(Malaysia) Goh Sze Fei	(China) Liang Weikeng (China) Wang Chang	17–21, 21–15, 10–21	Silver	

=== BWF World Tour (10 titles, 6 runners-up) ===
The BWF World Tour, which was announced on 19 March 2017 and implemented in 2018, is a series of elite badminton tournaments sanctioned by the Badminton World Federation (BWF). The BWF World Tours are divided into levels of World Tour Finals, Super 1000, Super 750, Super 500, Super 300, and the BWF Tour Super 100.

Men's doubles
Year	Tournament	Level	Partner	Opponent	Score	Result	Ref.
2022	German Open	Super 300	(Malaysia) Goh Sze Fei	(China) Liu Yuchen (China) Ou Xuanyi	23–21, 16–21, 21–14	(gold) Winner	
2022	Swiss Open	Super 300	(Malaysia) Goh Sze Fei	(Indonesia) Fajar Alfian (Indonesia) Muhammad Rian Ardianto	18–21, 19–21	(silver) Runner-up	
2023	Ruichang China Masters	Super 100	(Malaysia) Muhammad Haikal	(China) Chen Boyang (China) Liu Yi	16–21, 21–19, 21–23	(silver) Runner-up	
2023	U.S. Open	Super 300	(Malaysia) Goh Sze Fei	(Chinese Taipei) Lee Fang-chih (Chinese Taipei) Lee Fang-jen	21–9, 21–10	(gold) Winner	
2023	Kaohsiung Masters	Super 100	(Malaysia) Goh Sze Fei	(Chinese Taipei) Lee Jhe-huei (Chinese Taipei) Yang Po-hsuan	21–14, 21–10	(gold) Winner	
2023	Abu Dhabi Masters	Super 100	(Malaysia) Goh Sze Fei	(Thailand) Pharanyu Kaosamaang (Thailand) Worrapol Thongsa-nga	18–21, 21–17, 21–12	(gold) Winner	
2024	Japan Open	Super 750	(Malaysia) Goh Sze Fei	(South Korea) Kang Min-hyuk (South Korea) Seo Seung-jae	21–19, 21–15	(gold) Winner	
2024	China Open	Super 1000	(Malaysia) Goh Sze Fei	(China) He Jiting (China) Ren Xiangyu	13–21, 21–12, 21–17	(gold) Winner	
2024	Arctic Open	Super 500	(Malaysia) Goh Sze Fei	(Denmark) Kim Astrup (Denmark) Anders Skaarup Rasmussen	15–21, 21–15, 21–19	(gold) Winner	
2024	BWF World Tour Finals	World Tour Finals	(Malaysia) Goh Sze Fei	(Denmark) Kim Astrup (Denmark) Anders Skaarup Rasmussen	17–21, 21–17, 11–21	(silver) Runner-up	
2025	India Open	Super 750	(Malaysia) Goh Sze Fei	(South Korea) Kim Won-ho (South Korea) Seo Seung-jae	21–15, 13–21, 21–16	(gold) Winner	
2025	Japan Open	Super 750	(Malaysia) Goh Sze Fei	(South Korea) Kim Won-ho (South Korea) Seo Seung-jae	16–21, 17–21	(silver) Runner-up	
2026	Indonesia Masters	Super 500	(Malaysia) Goh Sze Fei	(Indonesia) Raymond Indra (Indonesia) Nikolaus Joaquin	21–19, 21–13	(gold) Winner	
2026	Malaysia Masters	Super 500	(Malaysia) Goh Sze Fei	(Denmark) Daniel Lundgaard (Denmark) Mads Vestergaard	16–21, 17–21	(silver) Runner-up	
2026	Indonesia Open	Super 1000	(Malaysia) Goh Sze Fei	(Indonesia) Raymond Indra (Indonesia) Nikolaus Joaquin	13–21, 21–18, 21–10	(gold) Winner	
2026	French Open	Super 750	(Malaysia) Goh Sze Fei	(Malaysia) Man Wei Chong (Malaysia) Tee Kai Wun	21–13, 15–21, 7–21	(silver) Runner-up	

=== BWF Grand Prix (1 runner-up) ===
The BWF Grand Prix had two levels, the Grand Prix and Grand Prix Gold. It was a series of badminton tournaments sanctioned by the Badminton World Federation (BWF) and played between 2007 and 2017.

Men's doubles
Year	Tournament	Partner	Opponent	Score	Result	Ref.
2017	Malaysia Masters	(Malaysia) Goh Sze Fei	(Indonesia) Berry Angriawan (Indonesia) Hardianto	19–21, 12–21	(silver) Runner-up	

BWF Grand Prix Gold tournament
BWF Grand Prix tournament

=== BWF International Challenge/Series (4 titles, 3 runners-up) ===
Men's doubles
Year	Tournament	Partner	Opponent	Score	Result
2016	Singapore International	(Malaysia) Goh Sze Fei	(Singapore) Danny Bawa Chrisnanta (Singapore) Hendra Wijaya	21–13, 21–14	(gold) Winner
2016	Vietnam International Series	(Malaysia) Goh Sze Fei	(Vietnam) Đỗ Tuấn Đức (Vietnam) Phạm Hồng Nam	21–17, 19–21, 20–22	(silver) Runner-up
2016	Swiss International	(Malaysia) Goh Sze Fei	(Malaysia) Aaron Chia (Malaysia) Wong Wai Jun	21–18, 21–12	(gold) Winner
2016	India International Series	(Malaysia) Goh Sze Fei	(India) Satwiksairaj Rankireddy (India) Chirag Shetty	11–8, 5–11, 11–7, 8–11, 5–11	(silver) Runner-up
2017	Malaysia International	(Malaysia) Goh Sze Fei	(Malaysia) Shia Chun Kang (Malaysia) Tan Wee Gieen	21–19, 21–12	(gold) Winner
2018	Tata Open India International	(Malaysia) Goh Sze Fei	(India) Arjun M.R. (India) B. Sumeeth Reddy	10–21, 16–21	(silver) Runner-up
2022	Malaysia International	(Malaysia) Muhammad Haikal	(Malaysia) Goh Boon Zhe (Malaysia) Goh Sze Fei	21–17, 21–16	(gold) Winner

BWF International Challenge tournament
BWF International Series tournament
BWF Future Series tournament
