= Goh Sze Fei =

Malaysian badminton player (born 1997)

Goh Sze Fei 吴世飞
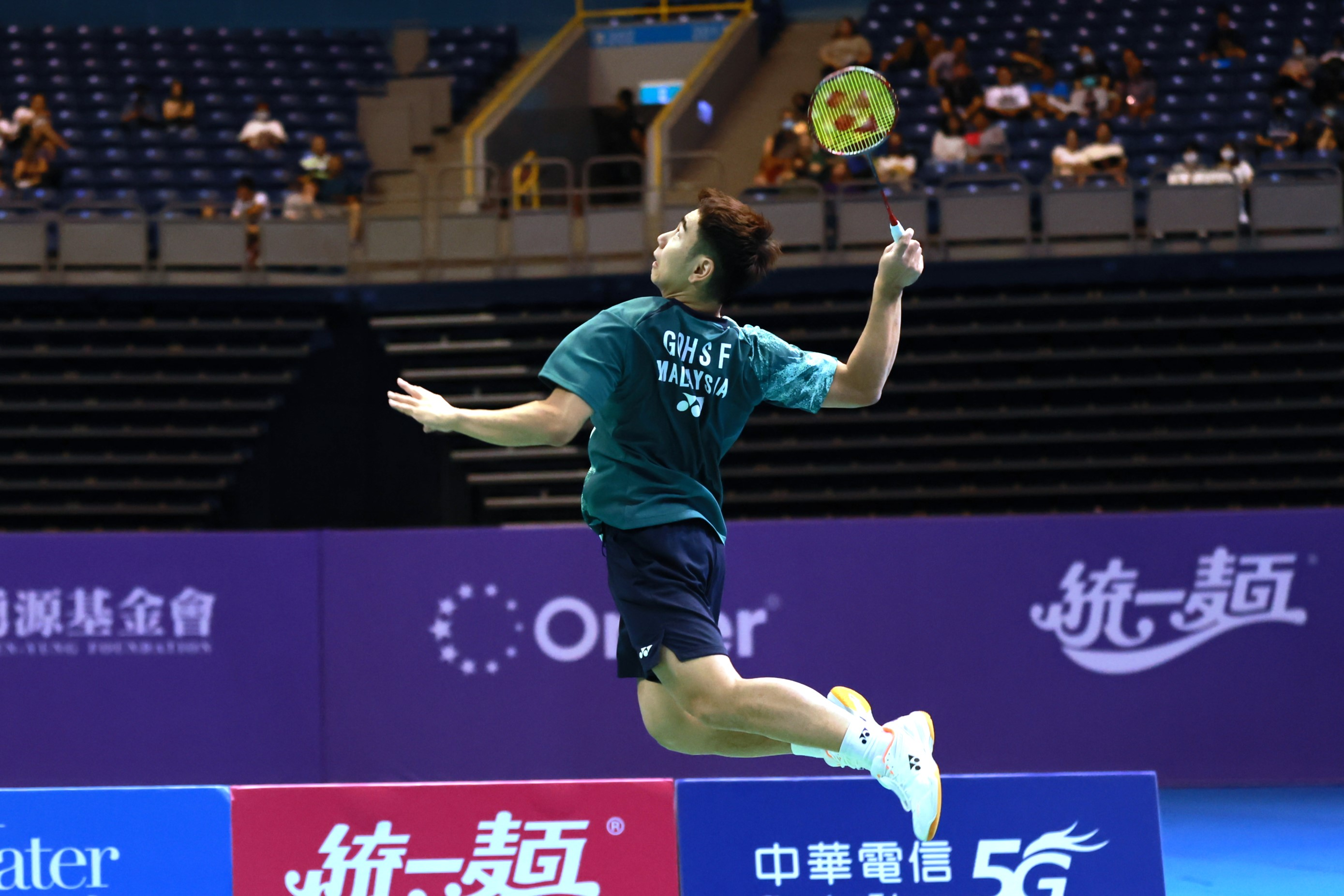
- Goh at the 2023 Kaohsiung Masters

Personal information
- Born: 18 August 1997 (age 29) Malacca, Malaysia
- Height: 1.71 m (5 ft 7 in)
- Spouse: Yoke Shan (m. 2025)

Sport
- Country: Malaysia
- Sport: Badminton
- Handedness: Right

Men's doubles
- Highest ranking: 1 (with Nur Izzuddin, 27 May 2025)
- Current ranking: 5 (with Nur Izzuddin, 10 November 2026)
- BWF profile
Medal record
Men's badminton
Representing Malaysia
Thomas Cup
Bronze medal – third place	2024 Chengdu	Men's team
Asian Championships
Silver medal – second place	2024 Ningbo	Men's doubles
Bronze medal – third place	2022 Manila	Men's doubles
Asia Team Championships
Gold medal – first place	2022 Selangor	Men's team
Silver medal – second place	2020 Manila	Men's team
Silver medal – second place	2024 Selangor	Men's team
Bronze medal – third place	2018 Alor Setar	Men's team
SEA Games
Silver medal – second place	2017 Kuala Lumpur	Men's team

Goh Sze Fei (simplified Chinese: 吴世飞; traditional Chinese: 吳世飛; pinyin: Wú Shìfēi, born 18 August 1997) is a Malaysian badminton player. A former world number one, Asian championship silver medalist and BWF World Tour Finals runner-up, he and his partner Nur Izzuddin won the men's doubles titles at the 2024 China Open and 2026 Indonesia Open, both BWF World Tour Super 1000 tournaments. Together, they reached the world number one ranking on 27 May 2025.

Goh and Izzuddin won a silver medal at the 2024 Asian Championships and a bronze medal at the 2022 Asian Championships. They also finished runners-up at the 2024 BWF World Tour Finals and won the 2022 German Open, 2024 Japan Open, 2024 Arctic Open, 2025 India Open and 2026 Indonesia Masters. Their victory at the 2026 Indonesia Open ended Malaysia's 18-year wait for a men's doubles title at the tournament, becoming the first Malaysian pair to achieve the feat since Mohd Fairuzizuan Mohd Tazari and Mohd Zakry Abdul Latif in 2008.

In team competitions, Goh was part of the Malaysian men's team that won gold at the 2022 Badminton Asia Team Championships, silver medals at the 2020 and 2024 Asian Team Championships, and bronze at the 2024 Thomas Cup. He also won a men's team silver medal at the 2017 SEA Games and was a member of Malaysia's bronze medal-winning squad at the 2018 Asian Team Championships.

== Early life ==
Goh finished his primary school in SJK(C) Chung Hua Tampin, Negeri Sembilan. During his secondary school period, which was in Sekolah Menengah Kebangsaan Tunku Besar at Tampin, he managed to get recruited into Badminton Association of Malaysia during his secondary school period to be trained as a national player.

Goh comes from a Malaysian Chinese family based in Tampin, Negeri Sembilan. There are 4 siblings in his family and he is the youngest among the siblings. All his siblings are very enthusiastic in badminton sports and Goh's eldest, Goh Sze Boon and second elder brother, Goh Sze Onn used to be Malaysian national players as well. Goh's first badminton coach was Goh Sai Chong who guided and coached Sze Fei since he was at his young age.

== Career ==
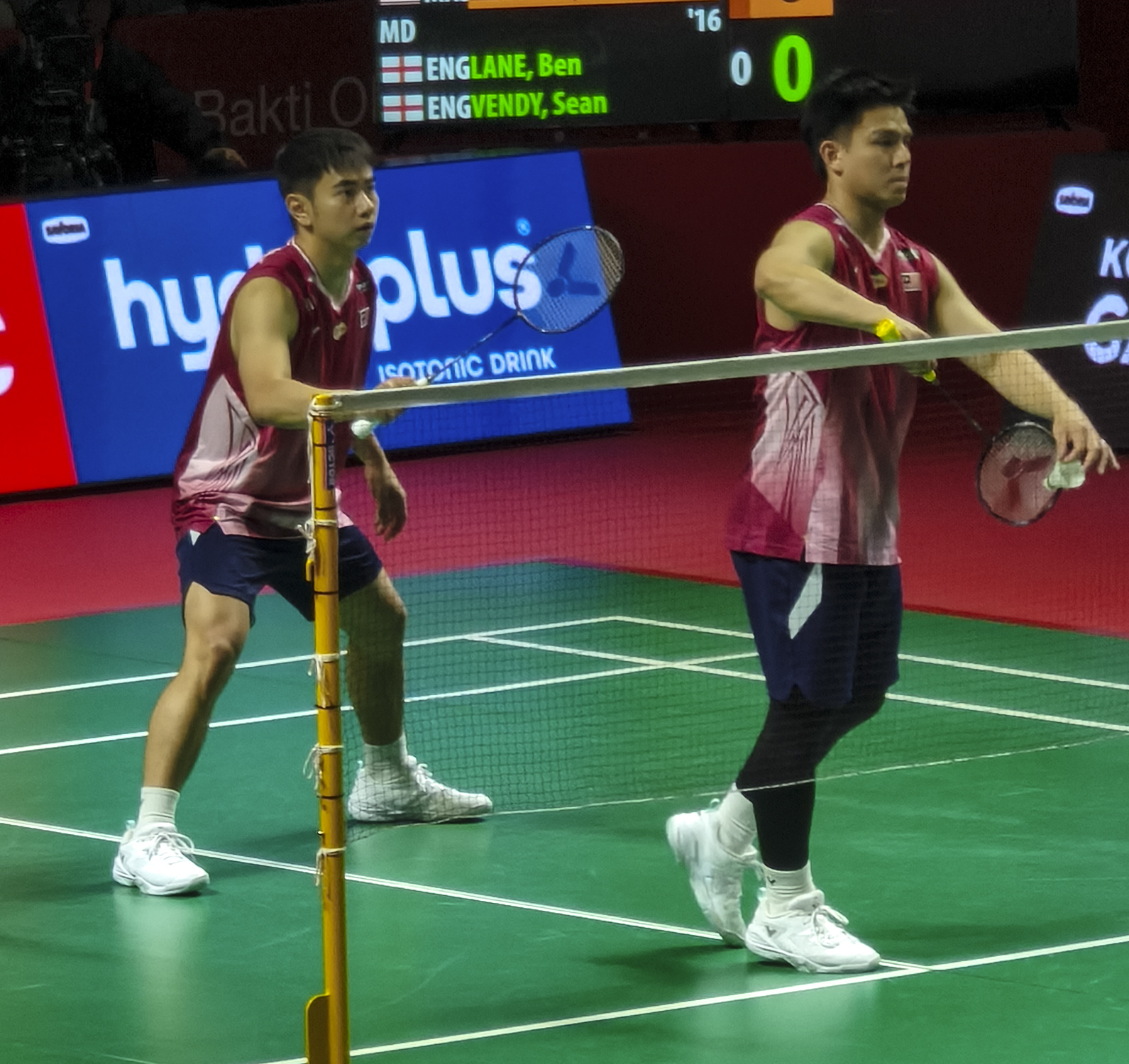
Goh and his current partner Nur Izzuddin at the 2026 Indonesia Open

In January 2017, Goh and his partner Nur Izzuddin entered their first Grand Prix Gold final at the 2017 Malaysia Masters and finished up as runner-ups.

=== 2022 ===
In March, Goh and Izzuddin won their first BWF World Tour title at the German Open beating Liu Yuchen and Ou Xuanyi in three games. In the following week, they entered their second consecutive final at the Swiss Open but lost out to rivals Fajar Alfian and Muhammad Rian Ardianto. In April, Goh and Izzuddin fell to compatriots Aaron Chia and Soh Wooi Yik at the semi-finals of Asian Championships, securing them a bronze medal. In December, Goh partnered Goh Boon Zhe at the Malaysia International and finished as runner-ups.

=== 2023 ===
In January, following their underwhelming results in the past few months, Goh and long-time partner Nur Izzuddin decided to split-up, citing lack of connection and loss of trust. In March, Goh and new partner Choong Hon Jian reached the final of their first outing as a pair at the Thailand International but lost out narrowly to top seeds Chaloempon Charoenkitamorn and Nanthakarn Yordphaisong in rubber game. Around four months after splitting up, Goh and Izzuddin reunited at the end of May. The pair set aside their differences and decided to rekindle their partnership in quest for the 2024 Summer Olympics spot.

In July, Goh and Izzuddin competed at the 2023 U.S. Open, their first tournament after reuniting. The pair emerged as winners defeating Chinese Taipei's Lee Fang-chih and Lee Fang-jen in the final. The duo also won the Super 100 event in the Kaohsiung and Abu Dhabi Masters. From May to December, Goh, along with Nur Dhabitah Sabri and Shahrul Saad were appointed as the brand ambassadors for Nutrilite Malaysia.

=== 2024 ===
Goh started the 2024 season with unsatisfactory results, as he and Izzuddin suffered multiple early rounds defeats in the Asian and European leg. Goh and Izzuddin finally reached the final of the Asian Championships in April, winning the silver medal. Their performance started to improve as evidenced by the results they achieved by reaching the quarter-finals of the Malaysia Masters, Singapore Open, and Indonesia Open. In August, it was reported that the pair had decided to leave the national team, and would officially start their career as independent players in early September. The duo then won the Japan Open in August, China Open in September, and Arctic Open in October.

In December, Goh and Izzuddin finished their 2024 season as the runners-up of the BWF World Tour Finals, losing to Kim Astrup and Anders Skaarup Rasmussen of Denmark in the final with a score of 17–21, 21–17, 11–21. This elevated them to world number 3, the highest ever ranking in their career. With that, they became the top Malaysian men's doubles pair, taking over Olympic bronze medalists Aaron Chia and Soh Wooi Yik. This also marks them being the first men's doubles pair in Malaysia to reach the final of the BWF World Tours since its establishment in 2018.

=== 2025 ===
Started the season as world number 2 in the BWF ranking, Goh and Izzuddin snapped their first India Open title by defeating Korean pair of Seo Seung-jae and Kim Won-ho in 3 sets. It was also the first title of the year for the pair. In July, Goh and Izzuddin failed to defend their Japan Open crown the previous year, losing to Seo and Kim in straight sets.

=== 2026 ===
In January, Goh and Izzuddin won their first title in the Indonesia Masters against Raymond Indra and Nikolaus Joaquin of Indonesia. However, they lost their second final at their home ground in Malaysia Masters against the Danish pair of Daniel Lundgaard and Mads Vestergaard. In early June, Goh and Izzuddin ended the 18-year wait for men's doubles champion at the Indonesia Open by defeating the same opponent they faced back in January, Indra and Joaquin. At the BWF World Championships, Goh and Izzuddin advanced to the quarterfinals stage before being knocked out by Kim and Seo in 40 minutes. Two months later, They reached their fourth final of the year where they lost against Man Wei Chong and Tee Kai Wun in an all-Malaysian final at the French Open in three games.

== Achievements ==
=== Asian Championships ===
Men's doubles
Year	Venue	Partner	Opponent	Score	Result	Ref.
2022	Muntinlupa Sports Complex; Metro Manila, Philippines	(Malaysia) Nur Izzuddin	(Malaysia) Aaron Chia (Malaysia) Soh Wooi Yik	13–21, 15–21	Bronze	
2024	Ningbo Olympic Sports Center Gymnasium; Ningbo, China	(Malaysia) Nur Izzuddin	(China) Liang Weikeng (China) Wang Chang	17–21, 21–15, 10–21	Silver	

=== BWF World Tour (10 titles, 5 runners-up) ===
The BWF World Tour, which was announced on 19 March 2017 and implemented in 2018, is a series of elite badminton tournaments sanctioned by the Badminton World Federation (BWF). The BWF World Tours are divided into levels of World Tour Finals, Super 1000, Super 750, Super 500, Super 300, and the BWF Tour Super 100.

Men's doubles
Year	Tournament	Level	Partner	Opponent	Score	Result	Ref.
2022	German Open	Super 300	(Malaysia) Nur Izzuddin	(China) Liu Yuchen (China) Ou Xuanyi	23–21, 16–21, 21–14	(gold) Winner	
2022	Swiss Open	Super 300	(Malaysia) Nur Izzuddin	(Indonesia) Fajar Alfian (Indonesia) Muhammad Rian Ardianto	18–21, 19–21	(silver) Runner-up	
2023	U.S. Open	Super 300	(Malaysia) Nur Izzuddin	(Chinese Taipei) Lee Fang-chih (Chinese Taipei) Lee Fang-jen	21–9, 21–10	(gold) Winner	
2023	Kaohsiung Masters	Super 100	(Malaysia) Nur Izzuddin	(Chinese Taipei) Lee Jhe-huei (Chinese Taipei) Yang Po-hsuan	21–14, 21–10	(gold) Winner	
2023	Abu Dhabi Masters	Super 100	(Malaysia) Nur Izzuddin	(Thailand) Pharanyu Kaosamaang (Thailand) Worrapol Thongsa-nga	18–21, 21–17, 21–12	(gold) Winner	
2024	Japan Open	Super 750	(Malaysia) Nur Izzuddin	(South Korea) Kang Min-hyuk (South Korea) Seo Seung-jae	21–19, 21–15	(gold) Winner	
2024	China Open	Super 1000	(Malaysia) Nur Izzuddin	(China) He Jiting (China) Ren Xiangyu	13–21, 21–12, 21–17	(gold) Winner	
2024	Arctic Open	Super 500	(Malaysia) Nur Izzuddin	(Denmark) Kim Astrup (Denmark) Anders Skaarup Rasmussen	15–21, 21–15, 21–19	(gold) Winner	
2024	BWF World Tour Finals	World Tour Finals	(Malaysia) Nur Izzuddin	(Denmark) Kim Astrup (Denmark) Anders Skaarup Rasmussen	17–21, 21–17, 11–21	(silver) Runner-up	
2025	India Open	Super 750	(Malaysia) Nur Izzuddin	(South Korea) Kim Won-ho (South Korea) Seo Seung-jae	21–15, 13–21, 21–16	(gold) Winner	
2025	Japan Open	Super 750	(Malaysia) Nur Izzuddin	(South Korea) Kim Won-ho (South Korea) Seo Seung-jae	16–21, 17–21	(silver) Runner-up	
2026	Indonesia Masters	Super 500	(Malaysia) Nur Izzuddin	(Indonesia) Raymond Indra (Indonesia) Nikolaus Joaquin	21–19, 21–13	(gold) Winner	
2026	Malaysia Masters	Super 500	(Malaysia) Nur Izzuddin	(Denmark) Daniel Lundgaard (Denmark) Mads Vestergaard	16–21, 17–21	(silver) Runner-up	
2026	Indonesia Open	Super 1000	(Malaysia) Nur Izzuddin	(Indonesia) Raymond Indra (Indonesia) Nikolaus Joaquin	13–21, 21–18, 21–10	(gold) Winner	
2026	French Open	Super 750	(Malaysia) Nur Izzuddin	(Malaysia) Man Wei Chong (Malaysia) Tee Kai Wun	21–13, 15–21, 7–21	(silver) Runner-up	

=== BWF Grand Prix (1 runner-up) ===
The BWF Grand Prix had two levels, the Grand Prix and Grand Prix Gold. It was a series of badminton tournaments sanctioned by the Badminton World Federation (BWF) and played between 2007 and 2017.

Men's doubles
Year	Tournament	Partner	Opponent	Score	Result	Ref.
2017	Malaysia Masters	(Malaysia) Nur Izzuddin	(Indonesia) Berry Angriawan (Indonesia) Hardianto	19–21, 12–21	(silver) Runner-up	

BWF Grand Prix Gold tournament
BWF Grand Prix tournament

=== BWF International Challenge/Series (3 titles, 5 runners-up) ===
Men's doubles
Year	Tournament	Partner	Opponent	Score	Result	Ref.
2016	Singapore International	(Malaysia) Nur Izzuddin	(Singapore) Danny Bawa Chrisnanta (Singapore) Hendra Wijaya	21–13, 21–14	(gold) Winner	
2016	Vietnam International Series	(Malaysia) Nur Izzuddin	(Vietnam) Đỗ Tuấn Đức (Vietnam) Phạm Hồng Nam	21–17, 19–21, 20–22	(silver) Runner-up	
2016	Swiss International	(Malaysia) Nur Izzuddin	(Malaysia) Aaron Chia (Malaysia) Wong Wai Jun	21–18, 21–12	(gold) Winner	
2016	India International Series	(Malaysia) Nur Izzuddin	(India) Satwiksairaj Rankireddy (India) Chirag Shetty	11–8, 5–11, 11–7, 8–11, 5–11	(silver) Runner-up	
2017	Malaysia International	(Malaysia) Nur Izzuddin	(Malaysia) Shia Chun Kang (Malaysia) Tan Wee Gieen	21–19, 21–12	(gold) Winner	
2018	Tata Open India International	(Malaysia) Nur Izzuddin	(India) Arjun M.R. (India) B. Sumeeth Reddy	10–21, 16–21	(silver) Runner-up	
2022	Malaysia International	(Malaysia) Goh Boon Zhe	(Malaysia) Muhammad Haikal (Malaysia) Nur Izzuddin	17–21, 16–21	(silver) Runner-up	
2023	Thailand International	(Malaysia) Choong Hon Jian	(Thailand) Chaloempon Charoenkitamorn (Thailand) Nanthakarn Yordphaisong	21–15, 15–21, 22–24	(silver) Runner-up	

BWF International Challenge tournament
BWF International Series tournament
BWF Future Series tournament
