= Pharanyu Kaosamaang =

Thai badminton player (born 2003)

Personal information
- Born: 6 March 2003 (age 23) Samut Sakhon, Thailand
- Height: 1.76 m (5 ft 9 in)

Sport
- Country: Thailand
- Sport: Badminton

Men's doubles
- Highest ranking: 37 (with Worrapol Thongsa-nga, 20 February 2024)
- Current ranking: 57 (with Tanadon Punpanich, 7 July 2026)
- BWF profile
Medal record
Men's badminton
Representing Thailand
Asia Mixed Team Championships
Bronze medal – third place	2023 Dubai	Mixed team

Pharanyu Kaosamaang (Thai: ภรัณยู ขาวสำอางค์; born 6 March 2003) is a Thai badminton player. He won his first international title at the 2022 Egypt International partnered with Worrapol Thongsa-nga.

== Achievements ==
=== BWF World Tour (1 runner-up) ===
The BWF World Tour, which was announced on 19 March 2017 and implemented in 2018, is a series of elite badminton tournaments sanctioned by the Badminton World Federation (BWF). The BWF World Tours are divided into levels of World Tour Finals, Super 1000, Super 750, Super 500, Super 300, and the BWF Tour Super 100.

Men's doubles
Year	Tournament	Level	Partner	Opponent	Score	Result
2023	Abu Dhabi Masters	Super 100	(Thailand) Worrapol Thongsa-nga	(Malaysia) Goh Sze Fei (Malaysia) Nur Izzuddin	21–18, 17–21, 12–21	(silver) Runner-up

=== BWF International Challenge/Series (4 titles, 3 runner-up) ===
Men's doubles
Year	Tournament	Partner	Opponent	Score	Result
2022	Egypt International	(Thailand) Worrapol Thongsa-nga	(France) Louis Ducrot (France) Romain Frank	21–11, 21–9	(gold) Winner
2022	Czech Open	(Thailand) Worrapol Thongsa-nga	(Chinese Taipei) Chiu Hsiang-chieh (Chinese Taipei) Yang Ming-tse	21–15, 21–15	(gold) Winner
2022	Bahrain International Series	(Thailand) Worrapol Thongsa-nga	(Thailand) Tanadon Punpanich (Thailand) Wachirawit Sothon	16–21, 16–21	(silver) Runner-up
2022	Bangladesh International	(Thailand) Worrapol Thongsa-nga	(Philippines) Christian Bernardo (Philippines) Alvin Morada	18–21, 21–10, 21–19	(gold) Winner
2023	Maldives International	(Thailand) Worrapol Thongsa-nga	(Malaysia) Low Hang Yee (Malaysia) Ng Eng Cheong	21–19, 21–16	(gold) Winner
2025	Thailand International	(Thailand) Tanadon Punpanich	(China) Chen Xujun (China) Guo Ruohan	21–19, 15–21, 18–21	(silver) Runner-up
2025 (II)	India International	(Thailand) Tanadon Punpanich	(India) Hariharan Amsakarunan (India) M. R. Arjun	14–21, 14–21	(silver) Runner-up

BWF International Challenge tournament
BWF International Series tournament
