= Al Ain Masters =

Annual badminton tournament held in UAE

- Official website
- Founded: 2023; 3 years ago
- Editions: 2 (2025)
- Location: Al Ain (2025); United Arab Emirates
- Venue: Al Ain Club (2025)
- Prize money: US$120,000 (2025)

Men's
- Draw: 48S / 32D
- Current champions: Joakim Oldorff (singles); Hariharan Amsakarunan Arjun M. R. (doubles)

Women's
- Draw: 32S / 32D
- Current champions: Shriyanshi Valishetty (singles); Gabriela Stoeva Stefani Stoeva; (doubles)

Mixed doubles
- Draw: 32
- Current champions: Dejan Ferdinansyah; Bernadine Wardana

Super 100
- Al Ain Masters; Akita Masters (2018–2019); Baoji China Masters; Dutch Open (2018–2019); Hyderabad Open (2018–2019); Indonesia Masters Super 100; Kaohsiung Masters; Malaysia Super 100; Guwahati Masters; Odisha Masters; Ruichang China Masters; Russian Open (2018–2019); Scottish Open (2018); Vietnam Open

Last completed
- 2025 Al Ain Masters

The Al Ain Masters, formerly known as Abu Dhabi Masters, is an annual badminton tournament held in United Arab Emirates. The tournament is a part of the BWF World Tour tournaments and is leveled in BWF Tour Super 100. The inaugural edition was held in 2023 at the JADNEC Marina Hall in Abu Dhabi, United Arab Emirates.

== Host cities ==
City	Years host
Abu Dhabi	2023
Al Ain	2025

Locations of Al Ain Masters host cities

== Winners ==
Year	Men's singles	Women's singles	Men's doubles	Women's doubles	Mixed doubles
2023	(Denmark) Mads Christophersen	(India) Unnati Hooda	(Malaysia) Goh Sze Fei (Malaysia) Nur Izzuddin	(India) Tanisha Crasto (India) Ashwini Ponnappa	(Denmark) Mads Vestergaard (Denmark) Christine Busch
2024	Cancelled (Note: This tournament, originally to be played from 1 to 6 October, was later cancelled.)				
2025	(Finland) Joakim Oldorff	(India) Shriyanshi Valishetty	(India) Hariharan Amsakarunan (India) Arjun M. R.	(Bulgaria) Gabriela Stoeva (Bulgaria) Stefani Stoeva	(Indonesia) Dejan Ferdinansyah (Indonesia) Bernadine Wardana
2026	Cancelled (Note: This tournament, originally to be played from 29 September to 4 October, was later cancelled.)				

== Performances by nation ==
As of the 2025 edition

Pos.	Nation	MS	WS	MD	WD	XD	Total
1	India		2	1	1		4
2	Denmark	1				1	2
3	Bulgaria				1		1
3	Finland	1					1
3	Indonesia					1	1
3	Malaysia			1			1
Total		2	2	2	2	2	10

== See also ==
- Dubai International, defunct
