= 2025 BWF World Championships – Men's singles =

Badminton championships

Men's singles at the 2025 BWF World Championships
- Venue: Adidas Arena
- Location: Paris, France
- Dates: 26–31 August
- Competitors: 64 from 40 nations

Medalists
gold medal	Shi Yuqi	China
silver medal	Kunlavut Vitidsarn	Thailand
bronze medal	Victor Lai	Canada
bronze medal	Anders Antonsen	Denmark

The men's singles tournament of the 2025 BWF World Championships took place from 26 to 31 August 2025 at the Adidas Arena in Paris.

== Seeds ==
The seeding list was based on the World Rankings of 5 August 2025.

1. (China) Shi Yuqi (champion)
2. (Denmark) Anders Antonsen (semi-finals)
3. (Thailand) Kunlavut Vitidsarn (final)
4. (China) Li Shifeng (first round)
5. (Indonesia) Jonatan Christie (quarter-finals)
6. (Chinese Taipei) Chou Tien-chen (quarter-finals)
7. (France) Alex Lanier (third round)
8. (Japan) Kodai Naraoka (third round)

9. (Singapore) Loh Kean Yew (quarter-finals)
10. (France) Christo Popov (third round)
11. (China) Lu Guangzu (second round)
12. (Chinese Taipei) Lin Chun-yi (second round)
13. (Hong Kong) Lee Cheuk Yiu (third round)
14. (Japan) Kenta Nishimoto (third round)
15. (France) Toma Junior Popov (third round)
16. (China) Weng Hongyang (quarter-finals)

Click on the seed number of a player to go to their draw section.

== Draw ==
The drawing ceremony was held on 13 August.

=== Finals ===
Semi-finals
1	(China) Shi Yuqi	13	22	21
(Canada) Victor Lai	21	20	16
3	(Thailand) Kunlavut Vitidsarn	21	21
2	(Denmark) Anders Antonsen	17	15

Final
1	(China) Shi Yuqi	19	21	21
3	(Thailand) Kunlavut Vitidsarn	21	10	18

=== Top half ===
==== Section 1 ====
First round
1	(China) Shi YQ	21	21
(India) L Sen	17	19
(Vietnam) Lê Đ P	20	21	9
(Belgium) J Carraggi	22	16	21
10	(France) C Popov	21	21
(Macau) Pui P F	15	16
(Hong Kong) Ng K L	16	21	21
(Austria) C V Filimon	21	15	7
7	(France) A Lanier	21	22
(Thailand) K Wangcharoen	10	20
(Azerbaijan) D D Pangestu	16	21	14
(Croatia) A Dinata	21	16	21
16	(China) Weng HY	21	21
(Australia) J Yu	7	12
(Chinese Taipei) Lee C-h	24	21
(Italy) G Toti	22	11

Second round
1	(China) Shi YQ	21	21
(Belgium) J Carraggi	15	11
10	(France) C Popov	21	21
(Hong Kong) Ng K L	15	16
7	(France) A Lanier	21	21
(Croatia) A Dinata	17	13
16	(China) Weng HY	21	21
(Chinese Taipei) Lee C-h	19	13

Third round
1	(China) Shi YQ	20	21	21
10	(France) C Popov	22	13	18
7	(France) A Lanier	18	12
16	(China) Weng HY	21	21

Quarter-finals
1	(China) Shi YQ	21	7	21
16	(China) Weng HY	15	21	10

==== Section 2 ====
First round
4	(China) Li SF	21	11	15
(Japan) Y Tanaka	19	21	21
(Malaysia) Lee Z J	17	11
(South Korea) Jeon H-j	21	21
11	(China) Lu GZ	16	22	21
(Singapore) J Teh	21	20	14
(Canada) V Lai	21	21
(New Zealand) E Lau	13	2
8	(Japan) K Naraoka	21	21
(Sri Lanka) D Abeywickrama	10	7
(Canada) B Yang	9	18
(Republic of Ireland) N Nguyen	21	21
9	(Singapore) Loh K Y	21	21
(Mauritius) J Paul	15	12
(England) H Huang	12	21	19
(Finland) K Koljonen	21	10	21

Second round
(Japan) Y Tanaka	12	9
(South Korea) Jeon H-j	21	21
11	(China) Lu GZ	21	12	10
(Canada) V Lai	13	21	21
8	(Japan) K Naraoka	21	21
(Republic of Ireland) N Nguyen	18	14
9	(Singapore) Loh K Y	21	21
(Finland) K Koljonen	14	14

Third round
(South Korea) Jeon H-j	17	13
(Canada) V Lai	21	21
8	(Japan) K Naraoka	21	19	19
9	(Singapore) Loh K Y	5	21	21

Quarter-finals
(Canada) V Lai	22	21
9	(Singapore) Loh K Y	20	18

=== Bottom half ===
==== Section 3 ====
First round
(Brazil) Y Coelho	16	21	18
(Germany) F Roth	21	19	21
(Sweden) G Björkler	9	17
13	(Hong Kong) Lee C Y	21	21
(Japan) K Watanabe	19	18
(Azerbaijan) A R Dwicahyo	21	21
(Germany) M Kicklitz	15	5
5	(Indonesia) J Christie	21	21
(Indonesia) A Farhan	22	21
(Vietnam) Nguyễn H Đ	20	13
(Denmark) R Gemke	21	18	14
12	(Chinese Taipei) Lin C-y	17	21	21
(Peru) A Viale	13	21	18
(South Korea) Kim B-j	21	19	21
(El Salvador) U Canjura	11	17
3	(Thailand) K Vitidsarn	21	21

Second round
(Germany) F Roth	16	21
13	(Hong Kong) Lee C Y	21	23
(Azerbaijan) A R Dwicahyo	9	17
5	(Indonesia) J Christie	21	21
(Indonesia) A Farhan	21	22
12	(Chinese Taipei) Lin C-y	17	20
(South Korea) Kim B-j	19	6
3	(Thailand) K Vitidsarn	21	21

Third round
13	(Hong Kong) Lee C Y	19	9
5	(Indonesia) J Christie	21	21
(Indonesia) A Farhan	18	21	20
3	(Thailand) K Vitidsarn	21	18	22

Quarter-finals
5	(Indonesia) J Christie	14	21	8
3	(Thailand) K Vitidsarn	21	18	21

==== Section 4 ====
First round
(Malaysia) Leong J H	21	21
(Switzerland) T Künzi	12	14
(Chinese Taipei) Wang T-w	13	12
14	(Japan) K Nishimoto	21	21
(Spain) P Abián	9	21	12
(England) E Rose	21	17	21
(Czech Republic) J Louda
6	(Chinese Taipei) Chou T-c	w	/	o
(Sri Lanka) V Nettasinghe	21	23
(Israel) M Zilberman	11	21
(Indonesia) A S Ginting	18	21	23
15	(France) T J Popov	21	19	25
(Finland) J Oldorff	18	15
(India) Prannoy H. S.	21	21
(Brazil) J Matias	15	16
2	(Denmark) A Antonsen	21	21

Second round
(Malaysia) Leong J H	21	13	23
14	(Japan) K Nishimoto	17	21	25
(England) E Rose	14	12
6	(Chinese Taipei) Chou T-c	21	21
(Sri Lanka) V Nettasinghe	17	9
15	(France) T J Popov	21	21
(India) Prannoy H. S.	7	21	21
2	(Denmark) A Antonsen	21	17	23

Third round
14	(Japan) K Nishimoto	21	15	13
6	(Chinese Taipei) Chou T-c	16	21	21
15	(France) T J Popov	6	22	19
2	(Denmark) A Antonsen	21	20	21

Quarter-finals
6	(Chinese Taipei) Chou T-c	17	21
2	(Denmark) A Antonsen	21	23

== Records ==
- Victor Lai made history by becoming the first Canadian to win a medal in any discipline after defeating former champion Loh Kean Yew.

== Qualifiers' performances ==
The table below lists out all the qualifiers of this edition by 26 July 2025.

Qualifier	Date of birth	Appearance	Best Performance(s)		Note
Qualifier	Date of birth	Appearance	Edition(s)	Result	Note
Champion
(China) Shi Yuqi	28 February 1996 (aged 29)	5th	18	S	15th Chinese men's singles gold medal, breaking 8-year drought, PB
Finalist
(Thailand) Kunlavut Vitidsarn	11 May 2001 (aged 24)	4th	23	G	Three consecutive WC finals (out of four), four including Olympics (out of five)
Semi-finalist
(Canada) Victor Lai	19 December 2004 (aged 20)	Debut			First Canadian WC Medalist, PB
(Denmark) Anders Antonsen	27 April 1997 (aged 28)	7th	19	S	
Quarter-finalist
(China) Weng Hongyang	18 June 1999 (aged 26)	Debut			PB
(Singapore) Loh Kean Yew	26 June 1997 (aged 28)	5th	21	G	
(Indonesia) Jonatan Christie	15 September 1997 (aged 27)	6th	19,22	QF	=PB
(Chinese Taipei) Chou Tien-chen	8 January 1990 (aged 35)	10th	22	B	
Third rounder
(France) Christo Popov	8 March 2002 (aged 23)	2nd	23	2R	PB
(France) Alex Lanier	26 January 2005 (aged 20)	Debut			PB
(South Korea) Jeon Hyeok-jin	13 June 1995 (aged 30)	2nd	23	2R	PB
(Japan) Kodai Naraoka	30 June 2001 (aged 24)	3rd	23	S	
(Hong Kong) Lee Cheuk Yiu	28 August 1996 (aged 28)	5th	21,22,23	3R	=PB
(Indonesia) Alwi Farhan	12 May 2005 (aged 20)	Debut			Youngest qualifier, PB
(Japan) Kenta Nishimoto	30 August 1994 (aged 30)	6th	23	QF	
(France) Toma Junior Popov	29 September 1998 (aged 26)	3th	23	2R	PB
Second rounder
(Belgium) Julien Carraggi	2 June 2000 (aged 25)	3rd	23	2R	=PB
(Hong Kong) Ng Ka Long	24 June 1994 (aged 31)	8th	17,18,19,22,23	3R	
(Croatia) Aria Dinata	12 July 2003 (aged 22)	Debut			PB
(Chinese Taipei) Lee Chia-hao	4 June 1999 (aged 26)	Debut			PB
(Japan) Yushi Tanaka	5 October 1999 (aged 25)	Debut			PB
(China) Lu Guangzu	5 October 1999 (aged 25)	5th	21	3R	
(Republic of Ireland) Nhat Nguyen	16 June 2000 (aged 25)	6th	21	3R	
(Finland) Kalle Koljonen	26 February 1994 (aged 31)	7th	21	2R	=PB
(Germany) Fabian Roth	29 November 1995 (aged 29)	2nd	17	1R	PB
(Azerbaijan) Ade Resky Dwicahyo	13 May 1998 (aged 27)	4th	21,23	2R	=PB
(Chinese Taipei) Lin Chun-yi	2 October 1999 (aged 25)	Debut			PB
(South Korea) Kim Byung-jae	4 April 2004 (aged 21)	Debut			PB
(Malaysia) Leong Jun Hao	13 July 1999 (aged 26)	Debut			PB
(England) Ethan Rose	1 January 2003 (aged 22)	Debut			PB
(Sri Lanka) Viren Nettasinghe	17 June 2003 (aged 22)	Debut			PB
(India) Prannoy H. S.	17 July 1992 (aged 33)	7th	23	B	
First rounder
(India) Lakshya Sen	16 August 2001 (aged 24)	4th	21	B	
(Vietnam) Lê Đức Phát	1 February 1998 (aged 27)	Debut			PB
(Macau) Pui Pang Fong	13 March 2000 (aged 25)	Debut			PB
(Austria) Collins Filimon	14 February 1998 (aged 27)	Debut			PB
(Thailand) Kantaphon Wangcharoen	18 September 1998 (aged 26)	5th	19	B	
(Azerbaijan) Dicky Dwi Pangestu	8 May 2004 (aged 21)	Debut			PB
(Australia) Jack Yu	13 September 2004 (aged 20)	Debut			Reigning Oceanian champion, PB
(Italy) Giovanni Toti	28 December 2000 (aged 24)	2nd	23	1R	=PB
(China) Li Shifeng	9 January 2000 (aged 25)	3rd	23	2R	
(Malaysia) Lee Zii Jia	29 March 1998 (aged 27)	5th	19, 21	QF	
(Singapore) Jason Teh	25 August 2000 (aged 25)	3rd	23	2R	
(New Zealand) Edward Lau	22 February 2001 (aged 24)	Debut			PB
(Sri Lanka) Dumindu Abeywickrama	5 March 2003 (aged 22)	Debut			PB
(Canada) Brian Yang	25 September 2001 (aged 23)	3rd	21	3R	
(Mauritius) Julien Paul	7 January 1996 (aged 29)	6th	22	2R	
(England) Harry Huang	25 August 2001 (aged 24)	Debut			PB
(Brazil) Ygor Coelho	24 November 1996 (aged 28)	7th	18	3R	
(Sweden) Gustav Björkler	29 March 2002 (aged 23)	Debut			PB
(Japan) Koki Watanabe	29 January 1999 (aged 26)	2nd	21	2R	
(Germany) Matthias Kicklitz	5 April 2002 (aged 23)	Debut			PB
(Vietnam) Nguyen Hai Đang	24 September 2000 (aged 24)	2nd	23	1R	=PB
(Denmark) Rasmus Gemke	11 January 1997 (aged 28)	5th	21	3R	
(Peru) Adriano Viale	1 September 2004 (aged 20)	Debut			PB
(El Salvador) Uriel Canjura	12 September 2000 (aged 24)	2nd	23	2R	
(Switzerland) Tobias Kuenzi	18 February 1998 (aged 27)	Debut			PB
(Chinese Taipei) Wang Tzu-wei	27 February 1995 (aged 30)	6th	23	QF	
(Spain) Pablo Abián	12 June 1985 (aged 40)	14th	11,13	3R	Oldest and most participated qualifier
(Israel) Misha Zilberman	30 January 1989 (aged 36)	13th	10,18,19	3R	
(Indonesia) Anthony Sinisuka Ginting	20 October 1996 (aged 28)	5th	22	QF	
(Finland) Joakim Oldorff	14 December 2002 (aged 22)	Debut			PB
(Brazil) Jonathan Matias	10 February 2000 (aged 25)	2nd	23	1R	=PB
Withdrew
(Czech Republic) Jan Louda	25 April 1999 (aged 26)	3rd	22	2R	
