= 2023 BWF World Championships – Men's singles =

Badminton championships

Men's singles at the 2023 BWF World Championships
- Venue: Royal Arena
- Location: Copenhagen, Denmark
- Dates: 21–27 August
- Competitors: 64 from 40 nations

Medalists
gold medal	Kunlavut Vitidsarn	Thailand
silver medal	Kodai Naraoka	Japan
bronze medal	Prannoy H. S.	India
bronze medal	Anders Antonsen	Denmark

The men's singles tournament of the 2023 BWF World Championships took place from 21 to 27 August 2023 at the Royal Arena in Copenhagen.

== Seeds ==
The seeding list was based on the World Rankings of 1 August 2023.

1. (Denmark) Viktor Axelsen (quarter-finals)
2. (Indonesia) Anthony Sinisuka Ginting (withdrew)
3. (Thailand) Kunlavut Vitidsarn (champion)
4. (Japan) Kodai Naraoka (final)
5. (Indonesia) Jonatan Christie (first round)
6. (China) Li Shifeng (third round)
7. (Singapore) Loh Kean Yew (third round)
8. (China) Shi Yuqi (quarter-finals)

9. (India) Prannoy H. S. (semi-finals)
10. (Chinese Taipei) Chou Tien-chen (third round)
11. (India) Lakshya Sen (third round)
12. (Denmark) Anders Antonsen (semi-finals)
13. (China) Lu Guangzu (second round)
14. (Japan) Kenta Nishimoto (quarter-finals)
15. (Hong Kong) Lee Cheuk Yiu (third round)
16. (Hong Kong) Ng Ka Long (third round)

Click on the seed number of a player to go to their draw section.

== Draw ==
The drawing ceremony was held on 10 August.

=== Finals ===
Semi-finals
9	(India) Prannoy H. S.	21	13	14
3	(Thailand) Kunlavut Vitidsarn	18	21	21
4	(Japan) Kodai Naraoka	25	21
12	(Denmark) Anders Antonsen	23	12

Final
3	(Thailand) Kunlavut Vitidsarn	19	21	21
4	(Japan) Kodai Naraoka	21	18	7

=== Top half ===
==== Section 1 ====
First round
1	(Denmark) V Axelsen	21	21
(Republic of Ireland) N Nguyen	6	11
(Vietnam) Nguyễn H Đ	19	21	17
(France) C Popov	21	15	21
10	(Chinese Taipei) Chou T-c	21	21
(Guatemala) K Cordón	16	9
(Nigeria) A J Opeyori	18	21	19
(United States) H Shu	21	13	21
7	(Singapore) Loh K Y	21	21
(Spain) P Abián	12	9
(Azerbaijan) A R Dwicahyo	21	21
(United States) J Ma	14	17
9	(India) Prannoy H. S.	24	21
(Finland) K Koljonen	22	10
(Australia) N Tang	7	7
(Indonesia) C A Dwi Wardoyo	21	21

Second round
1	(Denmark) V Axelsen	21	21
(France) C Popov	6	8
10	(Chinese Taipei) Chou T-c	21	21
(United States) H Shu	8	12
7	(Singapore) Loh K Y	21	21
(Azerbaijan) A R Dwicahyo	4	11
9	(India) Prannoy H. S.	21	21
(Indonesia) C A Dwi Wardoyo	9	14

Third round
1	(Denmark) V Axelsen	21	21
10	(Chinese Taipei) Chou T-c	13	19
7	(Singapore) Loh K Y	18	21	19
9	(India) Prannoy H. S.	21	15	21

Quarter-finals
1	(Denmark) V Axelsen	21	15	16
9	(India) Prannoy H. S.	13	21	21

==== Section 2 ====
First round
3	(Thailand) K Vitidsarn	21	21
(Brazil) J Matias	16	14
(Mexico) J Castillo	8	13
(Brazil) Y Coelho	21	21
11	(India) L Sen	21	21
(Mauritius) J Paul	12	7
(Jordan) B A Alshannik	9	5
(South Korea) Jeon H-j	21	21
6	(China) Li SF	21	21
(Kazakhstan) D Panarin	10	8
(Thailand) K Wangcharoen	21	21
(Italy) F Caponio	11	11
13	(China) Lu GZ	21	22
(Netherlands) J Kweekel	15	20
(Chinese Taipei) Wang T-w	21	21
(Italy) G Toti	11	8

Second round
3	(Thailand) K Vitidsarn	21	21
(Brazil) Y Coelho	9	18
11	(India) L Sen	21	21
(South Korea) Jeon H-j	11	12
6	(China) Li SF	21	21
(Thailand) K Wangcharoen	10	12
13	(China) Lu GZ	16	21	19
(Chinese Taipei) Wang T-w	21	18	21

Third round
3	(Thailand) K Vitidsarn	21	16	21
11	(India) L Sen	14	21	13
6	(China) Li SF	15	14
(Chinese Taipei) Wang T-w	21	21

Quarter-finals
3	(Thailand) K Vitidsarn	18	21	21
(Chinese Taipei) Wang T-w	21	15	13

=== Bottom half ===
==== Section 3 ====
First round
(Canada) B. R. Sankeerth	21	16	18
(El Salvador) U Canjura	14	21	21
(Portugal) B Atilano	11	8
16	(Hong Kong) Ng K L	21	21
(Denmark) R Gemke	21	21
(Netherlands) M Caljouw	18	16
(Spain) L E Peñalver	21	8
8	(China) Shi YQ	23	21
(Czech Republic) J Louda	22	21	15
(Singapore) J Teh	24	17	21
(Germany) M Weißkirchen	19	15
15	(Hong Kong) Lee C Y	21	21
(France) T J Popov	21	21
(Switzerland) T Künzi	7	17
(Austria) L Wraber	7	10
4	(Japan) K Naraoka	21	21

Second round
(El Salvador) U Canjura	17	11
16	(Hong Kong) Ng K L	21	21
(Denmark) R Gemke	13	8
8	(China) Shi YQ	21	21
(Singapore) J Teh	17	21
15	(Hong Kong) Lee C Y	21	23
(France) T J Popov	12	16
4	(Japan) K Naraoka	21	21

Third round
16	(Hong Kong) Ng K L	7	21	20
8	(China) Shi YQ	21	14	22
15	(Hong Kong) Lee C Y	11	4
4	(Japan) K Naraoka	21	21

Quarter-finals
8	(China) Shi YQ	10	19
4	(Japan) K Naraoka	21	21

==== Section 4 ====
First round
(Malaysia) Ng T Y	21	26
(China) Zhao JP	19	24
(Israel) M Zilberman	8	15
12	(Denmark) A Antonsen	21	21
(Germany) K Schäfer	3^{r}
(Canada) B Yang	11
(Malaysia) Lee Z J	21	21
5	(Indonesia) J Christie	13	15
(Belgium) J Carraggi	21	21
(Slovakia) M Dratva	7	19
(India) S Kidambi	14	14
14	(Japan) K Nishimoto	21	21
(Japan) K Tsuneyama	21	21
(Egypt) A H Elgamal	8	8
(Ukraine) D Bosniuk	w	/	o
2	(Indonesia) A S Ginting

Second round
(Malaysia) Ng T Y	22	16
12	(Denmark) A Antonsen	24	21
(Canada) B Yang	11	16
(Malaysia) Lee Z J	21	21
(Belgium) J Carraggi	22	25	8
14	(Japan) K Nishimoto	24	23	21
(Japan) K Tsuneyama	22	21
(Ukraine) D Bosniuk	20	15

Third round
12	(Denmark) A Antonsen	21	21
(Malaysia) Lee Z J	18	17
14	(Japan) K Nishimoto	21	21
(Japan) K Tsuneyama	19	17

Quarter-finals
12	(Denmark) A Antonsen	21	21
14	(Japan) K Nishimoto	10	7

== Qualifiers' performances ==
The table below lists out all the qualifiers of this edition by 22 July 2023.

Qualifier	Date of birth	Appearance	Best Performance(s)		Note
Qualifier	Date of birth	Appearance	Edition(s)	Result	Note
Champion
(Thailand) Kunlavut Vitidsarn	11 May 2001 (aged 22)	3rd	22	S	PB
Finalist
(Japan) Kodai Naraoka	30 June 2001 (aged 22)	2nd	22	2R	PB
Semi-finalist
(Denmark) Anders Antonsen	27 April 1997 (aged 26)	6th	19	S	
(India) Prannoy H. S.	17 July 1992 (aged 31)	6th	21, 22	QF	PB
Quarter-finalist
(China) Shi Yuqi	28 February 1996 (aged 27)	4th	18	S	
(Chinese Taipei) Wang Tzu-wei	27 February 1995 (aged 28)	5th	22	3R	PB
(Denmark) Viktor Axelsen	4 January 1994 (aged 29)	8th	17, 22	G	Reigning Olympics, world and European champion
(Japan) Kenta Nishimoto	30 August 1994 (aged 28)	5th	18, 19, 22	3R	PB
Third rounder
(China) Li Shifeng	9 January 2000 (aged 23)	2nd	21	2R	PB
(Chinese Taipei) Chou Tien-chen	8 January 1990 (aged 33)	9th	22	B	
(Hong Kong) Lee Cheuk Yiu	28 August 1996 (aged 26)	4th	21, 22	3R	=PB
(Hong Kong) Ng Ka Long	24 June 1994 (aged 29)	6th	17, 18, 19, 22	3R	=PB
(India) Lakshya Sen	16 August 2001 (aged 22)	3rd	21	B	
(Japan) Kanta Tsuneyama	21 June 1996 (aged 27)	6th	18	QF	
(Malaysia) Lee Zii Jia	29 March 1998 (aged 25)	4th	19, 21	QF	
(Singapore) Loh Kean Yew	26 June 1997 (aged 26)	4th	21	G	
Second rounder
(Azerbaijan) Ade Resky Dwicahyo	13 May 1998 (aged 25)	3rd	21	2R	=PB
(Belgium) Julien Carraggi	2 July 2000 (aged 23)	2nd	22	1R	PB
(Brazil) Ygor Coelho	24 November 1996 (aged 26)	6th	18	3R	
(Canada) Brian Yang	25 November 2001 (aged 21)	2nd	21	3R	Reigning Pan America champion
(China) Lu Guangzu	19 October 1996 (aged 26)	4th	21	3R	
(Denmark) Rasmus Gemke	11 January 1997 (aged 26)	4th	21	3R	
(El Salvador) Uriel Canjura	12 September 2000 (aged 22)	Debut			First El Salvador qualifier, PB
(France) Christo Popov	8 March 2002 (aged 21)	Debut			Youngest qualifier, PB
(France) Toma Junior Popov	29 September 1998 (aged 24)	2nd	22	1R	PB
(Indonesia) Chico Aura Dwi Wardoyo	15 June 1998 (aged 25)	2nd	22	1R	PB
(Malaysia) Ng Tze Yong	16 May 2000 (aged 23)	2nd	22	2R	=PB
(Singapore) Jason Teh	25 August 2000 (aged 22)	2nd	22	1R	PB
(South Korea) Jeon Hyeok-jin	13 June 1995 (aged 28)	Debut			PB
(Thailand) Kantaphon Wangcharoen	18 September 1998 (aged 24)	4th	19	B	
(Ukraine) Danylo Bosniuk	23 August 2000 (aged 22)	2nd	22	1R	PB
(United States) Howard Shu	28 November 1990 (aged 32)	6th	13, 14, 15, 21, 22	1R	PB
First rounder
(Australia) Nathan Tang	26 August 1990 (aged 32)	Debut			PB
(Austria) Luka Wraber	7 September 1990 (aged 32)	9th	18, 21	2R	
(China) Zhao Junpeng	2 February 1996 (aged 27)	3rd	22	B	
(Brazil) Jonathan Matias	10 February 2000 (aged 23)	Debut			PB
(Canada) B. R. Sankeerth	22 December 1997 (aged 25)	Debut			PB
(Czech Republic) Jan Louda	25 April 1999 (aged 24)	2nd	22	2R	
(Egypt) Adham Hatem Elgamal	4 February 1998 (aged 25)	2nd	22	1R	=PB
(Finland) Kalle Koljonen	26 February 1994 (aged 29)	6th	21	2R	
(Germany) Kai Schäfer	13 June 1993 (aged 30)	5th	22, 21	2R	
(Germany) Max Weißkirchen	18 October 1996 (aged 26)	Debut			PB
(Guatemala) Kevin Cordón	28 November 1986 (aged 36)	6th	11	QF	
(India) Srikanth Kidambi	7 February 1993 (aged 30)	8th	21	S	
(Indonesia) Jonatan Christie	15 September 1997 (aged 25)	5th	19, 22	QF	
(Israel) Misha Zilberman	25 January 1989 (aged 34)	12th	10, 18, 19	2R	
(Italy) Fabio Caponio	26 March 1999 (aged 24)	Debut			PB
(Italy) Giovanni Toti	28 December 2000 (aged 22)	Debut			PB
(Jordan) Bahaedeen Ahmad Alshannik	18 July 1997 (aged 26)	Debut			PB
(Kazakhstan) Dmitriy Panarin	8 January 2000 (aged 23)	Debut			PB
(Mauritius) Julien Paul	7 January 1996 (aged 27)	5th	22	2R	
(Mexico) Job Castillo	1 November 1992 (aged 30)	Debut			PB
(Netherlands) Mark Caljouw	25 January 1995 (aged 28)	6th	21	QF	
(Netherlands) Joran Kweekel	16 May 1998 (aged 25)	2nd	21	1R	=PB
(Nigeria) Anuoluwapo Juwon Opeyori	1 June 1997 (aged 26)	2nd	21	1R	Reigning African champion, =PB
(Portugal) Bernardo Atilano	19 June 1996 (aged 27)	3rd	22	2R	
(Republic of Ireland) Nhat Nguyen	16 June 2000 (aged 23)	5th	21	3R	
(Slovakia) Milan Dratva	24 April 1996 (aged 27)	Debut			PB
(Spain) Pablo Abián	12 June 1985 (aged 38)	13th	11, 13	3R	Oldest and most participated qualifier
(Spain) Luís Enrique Peñalver	10 February 1996 (aged 27)	5th	18, 19, 21, 22	2R	
(Switzerland) Tobias Künzi	18 February 1998 (aged 25)	Debut			PB
(United States) Justin Ma	2 May 1997 (aged 26)	Debut			PB
(Vietnam) Nguyễn Hải Đăng	24 September 2000 (aged 22)	Debut			PB
Withdrew
(Indonesia) Anthony Sinisuka Ginting	11 May 1996 (aged 27)	5th	22	QF	Reigning Asian Champion
