= Badminton at the 2023 European Games – Men's singles =

Badminton's men's singles at the 2023 European Games
- Venue: Arena Jaskółka, Tarnów
- Dates: 26 June - 2 July
- Competitors: 32 from 30 nations

Medalists
gold medal	Viktor Axelsen	Denmark
silver medal	Christo Popov	France
bronze medal	Toma Junior Popov	France
bronze medal	Misha Zilberman	Israel

The men's singles badminton tournament at the 2023 European Games was played from 26 June to 2 July 2023 in Arena Jaskółka, Tarnów. A total of 32 players competed at the tournament, eight of whom was seeded.

== Competition format ==
The tournament started with group phase round-robin which eliminated 16 players, followed by a single-elimination knockout stage. For the group stage, the players were divided into eight groups of four. Each group played a round-robin. The top two players in each group advanced to the knockout rounds. The knockout stage was a four-round single elimination tournament.

Matches are played best-of-three games. Each game is played to 21, except that a player must win by 2 unless the score reaches 30–29.

== Seeding ==
The following players were seeded:

1. (Denmark) Viktor Axelsen (Gold medalist)
2. (Denmark) Anders Antonsen (Group stage)
3. (France) Toma Junior Popov (Bronze medalist)
4. (Republic of Ireland) Nhat Nguyen (Round of 16)
5. (France) Christo Popov (Silver medalist)
6. (Israel) Misha Zilberman (Bronze medalist)
7. (Spain) Luís Enrique Peñalver (Group stage)
8. (Czech Republic) Jan Louda (Round of 16)

== Competition schedule ==
Play will take place between 26 June an 2 July.

GS	Group stage	R16	Round of 16	¼	Quarterfinals	½	Semifinals	F	Final

Events	Mon 26	Tue 27	Wed 28	Thu 29	Fri 30	Sat 1	Sun 2
Men's singles	GS	GS	GS	R16	¼	½	F

== Pool Stage ==
=== Group A ===
Pos	Team	Pld	W	L	GF	GA	GD	PF	PA	PD	Qualification
1	Viktor Axelsen (DEN) [1]	3	3	0	6	0	+6	126	48	+78	Qualification to knock-out stage
2	Giovanni Toti (ITA)	3	2	1	4	2	+2	107	84	+23	Qualification to knock-out stage
3	Dominik Kwinta (POL)	3	1	2	2	4	−2	92	90	+2	
4	Teodor Ioan Cioroboiu (ROU)	3	0	3	0	6	−6	23	126	−103	

Date		Score		Game 1	Game 2	Game 3
26 June	Dominik Kwinta (Poland)	2–0	(Romania) Teodor Ioan Cioroboiu	21–3	21–2	
26 June	Viktor Axelsen (Denmark)	2–0	(Italy) Giovanni Toti	21–17	21–5	
27 June	Viktor Axelsen (Denmark)	2–0	(Romania) Teodor Ioan Cioroboiu	21–3	21–5	
27 June	Dominik Kwinta (Poland)	0–2	(Italy) Giovanni Toti	20–22	12–21	
28 June	Teodor Ioan Cioroboiu (Romania)	0–2	(Italy) Giovanni Toti	3–21	7–21	
28 June	Viktor Axelsen (Denmark)	2–0	(Poland) Dominik Kwinta	21–9	21–9	

=== Group B ===
Pos	Team	Pld	W	L	GF	GA	GD	PF	PA	PD	Qualification
1	Felix Burestedt (SWE)	3	2	1	5	2	+3	139	130	+9	Qualification to knock-out stage
2	Kalle Koljonen (FIN)	3	2	1	5	3	+2	159	141	+18	Qualification to knock-out stage
3	Anders Antonsen (DEN) [2]	3	2	1	4	3	+1	137	116	+21	
4	Emre Lale (TUR)	3	0	3	0	6	−6	78	126	−48	

Date		Score		Game 1	Game 2	Game 3
26 June	Kalle Koljonen (Finland)	2–1	(Sweden) Felix Burestedt	20–22	23–21	21–12
26 June	Anders Antonsen (Denmark)	2–0	(Turkey) Emre Lale	21–12	21–9	
27 June	Anders Antonsen (Denmark)	0–2	(Sweden) Felix Burestedt	19–21	19–21	
27 June	Kalle Koljonen (Finland)	2–0	(Turkey) Emre Lale	21–18	21–11	
28 June	Anders Antonsen (Denmark)	2–1	(Finland) Kalle Koljonen	15–21	21–15	21–17
28 June	Felix Burestedt (Sweden)	2–0	(Turkey) Emre Lale	21–18	21–10	

=== Group C ===
Pos	Team	Pld	W	L	GF	GA	GD	PF	PA	PD	Qualification
1	Toma Junior Popov (FRA) [3]	3	3	0	6	0	+6	126	61	+65	Qualification to knock-out stage
2	Tobias Künzi (SUI)	3	2	1	4	3	+1	131	119	+12	Qualification to knock-out stage
3	Bernardo Atilano (POR)	3	1	2	2	5	−3	99	136	−37	
4	Karl Kert (EST)	3	0	3	2	6	−4	120	160	−40	

Date		Score		Game 1	Game 2	Game 3
26 June	Bernardo Atilano (Portugal)	0–2	(Switzerland) Tobias Künzi	16–21	12–21	
26 June	Toma Junior Popov (France)	2–0	(Estonia) Karl Kert	21–13	21–6	
27 June	Bernardo Atilano (Portugal)	2–1	(Estonia) Karl Kert	15–21	21–19	21–12
27 June	Toma Junior Popov (France)	2–0	(Switzerland) Tobias Künzi	21–15	21–13	
28 June	Tobias Künzi (Switzerland)	2–1	(Estonia) Karl Kert	19–21	21–13	21–15
28 June	Toma Junior Popov (France)	2–0	(Portugal) Bernardo Atilano	21–6	21–8	

=== Group D ===
Pos	Team	Pld	W	L	GF	GA	GD	PF	PA	PD	Qualification
1	Mark Caljouw (NED)	3	3	0	6	1	+5	149	123	+26	Qualification to knock-out stage
2	Nhat Nguyen (IRL) [4]	3	2	1	4	2	+2	117	106	+11	Qualification to knock-out stage
3	Johnnie Torjussen (GBR)	3	1	2	3	4	−1	127	144	−17	
4	Milan Dratva (SVK)	3	0	3	0	6	−6	109	129	−20	

Date		Score		Game 1	Game 2	Game 3
26 June	Nhat Nguyen (Republic of Ireland)	2–0	(Slovakia) Milan Dratva	23–21	21–19	
26 June	Mark Caljouw (Netherlands)	2–1	(United Kingdom) Johnnie Torjussen	22–24	22–20	21–16
27 June	Mark Caljouw (Netherlands)	2–0	(Slovakia) Milan Dratva	21–19	21–13	
27 June	Nhat Nguyen (Republic of Ireland)	2–0	(United Kingdom) Johnnie Torjussen	21–8	21–16	
28 June	Johnnie Torjussen (United Kingdom)	2–0	(Slovakia) Milan Dratva	22–20	21–17	
28 June	Nhat Nguyen (Republic of Ireland)	0–2	(Netherlands) Mark Caljouw	16–21	15–21	

=== Group E ===
Pos	Team	Pld	W	L	GF	GA	GD	PF	PA	PD	Qualification
1	Christo Popov (FRA) [5]	3	3	0	6	0	+6	126	56	+70	Qualification to knock-out stage
2	Gergő Pytel (HUN)	3	2	1	4	2	+2	109	100	+9	Qualification to knock-out stage
3	Filip Špoljarec (CRO)	3	1	2	2	4	−2	87	107	−20	
4	Matthew Abela (MLT)	3	0	3	0	6	−6	68	127	−59	

Date		Score		Game 1	Game 2	Game 3
26 June	Gergő Pytel (Hungary)	2–0	(Malta) Matthew Abela	21–13	22–20	
26 June	Christo Popov (France)	2–0	(Croatia) Filip Špoljarec	21–11	21–9	
27 June	Christo Popov (France)	2–0	(Malta) Matthew Abela	21–7	21–5	
27 June	Gergő Pytel (Hungary)	2–0	(Croatia) Filip Špoljarec	21–19	21–6	
28 June	Christo Popov (France)	2–0	(Hungary) Gergő Pytel	21–12	21–12	
28 June	Matthew Abela (Malta)	0–2	(Croatia) Filip Špoljarec	11–21	12–21	

=== Group F ===
Pos	Team	Pld	W	L	GF	GA	GD	PF	PA	PD	Qualification
1	Misha Zilberman (ISR) [6]	3	3	0	6	0	+6	126	78	+48	Qualification to knock-out stage
2	Markus Barth (NOR)	3	2	1	4	2	+2	119	92	+27	Qualification to knock-out stage
3	Andraž Krapež (SLO)	3	1	2	2	4	−2	87	106	−19	
4	Jérôme Pauquet (LUX)	3	0	3	0	6	−6	70	126	−56	

Date		Score		Game 1	Game 2	Game 3
26 June	Misha Zilberman (Israel)	2–0	(Luxembourg) Jérôme Pauquet	21–8	21–14	
26 June	Markus Barth (Norway)	2–0	(Slovenia) Andraž Krapež	21–11	21–13	
27 June	Misha Zilberman (Israel)	2–0	(Slovenia) Andraž Krapež	21–11	21–10	
27 June	Markus Barth (Norway)	2–0	(Luxembourg) Jérôme Pauquet	21–17	21–9	
28 June	Misha Zilberman (Israel)	2–0	(Norway) Markus Barth	21–17	21–18	
28 June	Andraž Krapež (Slovenia)	2–0	(Luxembourg) Jérôme Pauquet	21–10	21–12	

=== Group G ===
Pos	Team	Pld	W	L	GF	GA	GD	PF	PA	PD	Qualification
1	Ade Resky Dwicahyo (AZE)	3	3	0	6	2	+4	160	130	+30	Qualification to knock-out stage
2	Dimitar Yanakiev (BUL)	3	2	1	5	3	+2	146	137	+9	Qualification to knock-out stage
3	Luís Enrique Peñalver (ESP) [7]	3	1	2	3	4	−1	125	137	−12	
4	Danylo Bosniuk (UKR)	3	0	3	1	6	−5	115	142	−27	

Date		Score		Game 1	Game 2	Game 3
26 June	Dimitar Yanakiev (Bulgaria)	2–1	(Ukraine) Danylo Bosniuk	21–6	16–21	21–19
26 June	Luís Enrique Peñalver (Spain)	1–2	(Azerbaijan) Ade Resky Dwicahyo	16–21	21–17	14–21
27 June	Luís Enrique Peñalver (Spain)	2–0	(Ukraine) Danylo Bosniuk	21–19	21–17	
27 June	Dimitar Yanakiev (Bulgaria)	1–2	(Azerbaijan) Ade Resky Dwicahyo	21–17	16–21	9–21
28 June	Luís Enrique Peñalver (Spain)	0–2	(Bulgaria) Dimitar Yanakiev	13–21	19–21	
28 June	Danylo Bosniuk (Ukraine)	0–2	(Azerbaijan) Ade Resky Dwicahyo	14–21	19–21	

=== Group H ===
Pos	Team	Pld	W	L	GF	GA	GD	PF	PA	PD	Qualification
1	Julien Carraggi (BEL)	3	3	0	6	1	+5	144	109	+35	Qualification to knock-out stage
2	Jan Louda (CZE) [8]	3	2	1	4	2	+2	119	98	+21	Qualification to knock-out stage
3	Kai Schäfer (GER)	3	1	2	3	5	−2	132	155	−23	
4	Luka Wraber (AUT)	3	0	3	1	6	−5	104	137	−33	

Date		Score		Game 1	Game 2	Game 3
26 June	Julien Carraggi (Belgium)	2–0	(Austria) Luka Wraber	21–11	21–11	
26 June	Jan Louda (Czech Republic)	2–0	(Germany) Kai Schäfer	21–12	21–15	
27 June	Jan Louda (Czech Republic)	2–0	(Austria) Luka Wraber	21–15	21–14	
27 June	Julien Carraggi (Belgium)	2–1	(Germany) Kai Schäfer	21–19	18–21	21–12
28 June	Jan Louda (Czech Republic)	0–2	(Belgium) Julien Carraggi	18–21	17–21	
28 June	Luka Wraber (Austria)	1–2	(Germany) Kai Schäfer	19–21	21–11	13–21

== Knockout stage ==
The 16 surviving players will be drawn in a single elimination tournament, with group winners paired in the round-of-16 with runners up from other groups. There will be no bronze medal match, and both losing semi-finalists will win a bronze medal.

Round of 16
1	Viktor Axelsen (DEN)	21	21
4	Nhat Nguyen (IRL)	8	13
Ade Resky Dwicahyo (AZE)	18	14
Kalle Koljonen (FIN)	21	21
3	Toma Junior Popov (FRA)	21	21
Gergő Pytel (HUN)	8	14
Julien Carraggi (BEL)	19	21	23
Markus Barth (NOR)	21	14	21
8	Jan Louda (CZE)	21	19
5	Christo Popov (FRA)	23	21
Dimitar Yanakiev (BUL)	17	10
Mark Caljouw (NED)	21	21
Tobias Künzi (SUI)	14	21	21
6	Misha Zilberman (ISR)	21	19	23
Giovanni Toti (ITA)	16	14
Felix Burestedt (SWE)	21	21

Quarter finals
1	Viktor Axelsen (DEN)	21	21
Kalle Koljonen (FIN)	10	9
3	Toma Junior Popov (FRA)	21	21
Julien Carraggi (BEL)	16	15
5	Christo Popov (FRA)	21	9	25
Mark Caljouw (NED)	6	21	23
6	Misha Zilberman (ISR)	17	21	21
Felix Burestedt (SWE)	21	14	19

Semi finals
1	Viktor Axelsen (DEN)	21	21
3	Toma Junior Popov (FRA)	17	18
5	Christo Popov (FRA)	21	21
6	Misha Zilberman (ISR)	10	14

Gold medal match
1	Viktor Axelsen (DEN)	16	21	21
5	Christo Popov (FRA)	21	16	11

== See also ==
Badminton at the 2023 European Games – Women's singles
