= 2021 BWF World Championships – Men's singles =

Badminton championships

Men's singles at the 2021 BWF World Championships
- Venue: Palacio de los Deportes Carolina Marín
- Location: Huelva, Spain
- Dates: 12–19 December

Medalists
gold medal	Loh Kean Yew	Singapore
silver medal	Srikanth Kidambi	India
bronze medal	Lakshya Sen	India
bronze medal	Anders Antonsen	Denmark

The men's singles tournament of the 2021 BWF World Championships took place from 12 to 19 December 2021 at the Palacio de los Deportes Carolina Marín at Huelva.

== Seeds ==
The seeding list is based on the World Rankings of 23 November 2021.

1. (Japan) Kento Momota (withdrew)
2. (Denmark) Viktor Axelsen (first round)
3. (Denmark) Anders Antonsen (semi-finals)
4. (Chinese Taipei) Chou Tien-chen (second round)
5. (Indonesia) Anthony Sinisuka Ginting (withdrew)
6. (Malaysia) Lee Zii Jia (quarter-finals)
7. (Indonesia) Jonatan Christie (withdrew)
8. (Hong Kong) Ng Ka Long (first round)
9. (Japan) Kanta Tsuneyama (second round)
10. (Chinese Taipei) Wang Tzu-wei (first round)
11. (Denmark) Rasmus Gemke (third round)
12. (India) Srikanth Kidambi (final)
13. (Hong Kong) Lee Cheuk Yiu (third round)
14. (India) B. Sai Praneeth (first round)
15. (Japan) Kenta Nishimoto (second round)
16. (Thailand) Kantaphon Wangcharoen (third round)

== Draw ==
=== Finals ===
Semi-finals
(India) Lakshya Sen	21	14	17
12	(India) Srikanth Kidambi	17	21	21
3	(Denmark) Anders Antonsen	21	14
(Singapore) Loh Kean Yew	23	21

Final
12	(India) Srikanth Kidambi	15	20
(Singapore) Loh Kean Yew	21	22

=== Upper part ===
==== Groups 1 ====
First Round
1	(Japan) K Momota
(Poland) M Rogalski	w	/	o
(Netherlands) J Kweekel	18	21	16
(Guatemala) K Cordón	21	10	21
15	(Japan) K Nishimoto	21	21
(Malaysia) Cheam J W	17	8
(India) L Sen	w	/	o
(Germany) M Weißkirchen
7	(Indonesia) J Christie
(Republic of Ireland) N Nguyen	w	/	o
(France) T J Popov
(England) T Penty	w	/	o
10	(Chinese Taipei) Wang T-w	21	17	15
(China) Zhao JP	16	21	21
(Nigeria) A J Opeyori	11	1
(Japan) K Watanabe	21	21

Second Round
(Poland) M Rogalski	14	19
(Guatemala) K Cordón	21	21
15	(Japan) K Nishimoto	20	21	18
(India) L Sen	22	15	21
(Republic of Ireland) N Nguyen	21	23
(England) T Penty	17	21
(China) Zhao JP	21	21
(Japan) K Watanabe	11	15

Third Round
(Guatemala) K Cordón	13	8
(India) L Sen	21	21
(Republic of Ireland) N Nguyen	19	21	18
(China) Zhao JP	21	19	21

Quarter-finals
(India) L Sen	21	15	22
(China) Zhao JP	15	21	20

==== Section 2 ====
First Round
4	(Chinese Taipei) Chou T-c	21	21
(Thailand) S Thammasin	12	10
(Thailand) K Vitidsarn	16	12
(China) Lu GZ	21	21
12	(India) S Kidambi	21	21
(Spain) P Abián	12	16
(China) Li SF	21	21
(United States) T Lam	6	10
5	(Indonesia) A S Ginting
(France) T Rouxel	w	/	o
(Canada) B Yang	21	21
(Portugal) B Atilano	15	8
14	(India) B. Sai Praneeth	21	7	18
(Netherlands) M Caljouw	17	21	21
(Mexico) L Muñoz	8	8
(Finland) K Koljonen	21	21

Second Round
4	(Chinese Taipei) Chou T-c	21	15	15
(China) Lu GZ	14	21	21
12	(India) S Kidambi	15	21	21
(China) Li SF	21	18	17
(France) T Rouxel	12	22
(Canada) B Yang	21	24
(Netherlands) M Caljouw	14	22	21
(Finland) K Koljonen	21	20	11

Third Round
(China) Lu GZ	10	15
12	(India) S Kidambi	21	21
(Canada) B Yang	20	12
(Netherlands) M Caljouw	22	21

Quarter-finals
12	(India) S Kidambi	21	21
(Netherlands) M Caljouw	8	7

=== Bottom half ===
==== Section 3 ====
First Round
(Vietnam) Nguyễn T M	16	23	10
(Denmark) H-K Vittinghus	21	21	21
(Russia) S Sirant	17	21	18
9	(Japan) K Tsuneyama	21	17	21
(Belgium) M Moreels	18	9
(Brazil) Y Coelho	21	21
(Canada) J Ho-Shue	10	21	11
6	(Malaysia) Lee Z J	21	17	21
(Turkey) E Lale	15	16
(Azerbaijan) A R Dwicahyo	21	21
(United States) H Shu	8	14
13	(Hong Kong) Lee C Y	21	21
(Indonesia) T Sugiarto
(Sri Lanka) N Karunaratne	w	/	o
(Russia) V Malkov	16	13
3	(Denmark) A Antonsen	21	21

Second Round
(Denmark) H-K Vittinghus	11	21	21
9	(Japan) K Tsuneyama	21	13	17
(Brazil) Y Coelho	14	24	14
6	(Malaysia) Lee Z J	21	22	21
(Azerbaijan) A R Dwicahyo	13	15
13	(Hong Kong) Lee C Y	21	21
(Sri Lanka) N Karunaratne	11	15
3	(Denmark) A Antonsen	21	21

Third Round
(Denmark) H-K Vittinghus	15	21	10
6	(Malaysia) Lee Z J	21	15	21
13	(Hong Kong) Lee C Y	9	11
3	(Denmark) A Antonsen	21	21

Quarter-finals
6	(Malaysia) Lee Z J	21	8	1^{r}
3	(Denmark) A Antonsen	12	21	11

==== Section 4 ====
First Round
(Mexico) L Montoya	15	13
(Spain) L E Peñalver	21	21
(France) B Leverdez	13	7
11	(Denmark) R Gemke	21	21
(Malaysia) Liew D	21	21
(Israel) M Zilberman	14	14
(India) Prannoy K	13	21	21
8	(Hong Kong) Ng K L	21	18	19
(South Korea) Heo K-h
(Germany) K Schäfer	w	/	o
(Sweden) F Burestedt	17	21	9
16	(Thailand) K Wangcharoen	21	15	21
(Austria) L Wraber	w	/	o
(Indonesia) S H Rhustavito
(Singapore) Loh K Y	14	21	21
2	(Denmark) V Axelsen	21	9	6

Second Round
(Spain) L E Peñalver	20	12
11	(Denmark) R Gemke	22	21
(Malaysia) Liew D	7	17
(India) Prannoy K	21	21
(Germany) K Schäfer	14	14
16	(Thailand) K Wangcharoen	21	21
(Austria) L Wraber	4	8
(Singapore) Loh K Y	21	21

Third Round
11	(Denmark) R Gemke	21	8	20
(India) Prannoy K	16	21	22
16	(Thailand) K Wangcharoen	4	7
(Singapore) Loh K Y	21	21

Quarter-finals
(India) Prannoy K	14	12
(Singapore) Loh K Y	21	21
