= 2022 BWF World Championships – Men's singles =

Badminton championships

Men's singles at the 2022 BWF World Championships
- Venue: Tokyo Metropolitan Gymnasium
- Location: Tokyo, Japan
- Dates: 22–28 August
- Competitors: 62 from 37 nations

Medalists
gold medal	Viktor Axelsen	Denmark
silver medal	Kunlavut Vitidsarn	Thailand
bronze medal	Zhao Junpeng	China
bronze medal	Chou Tien-chen	Chinese Taipei

The men's singles tournament of the 2022 BWF World Championships took place from 22 to 28 August 2022 at the Tokyo Metropolitan Gymnasium in Tokyo.

== Seeds ==
The seeding list was based on the World Rankings of 9 August 2022.

1. (Denmark) Viktor Axelsen (champion)
2. (Japan) Kento Momota (second round)
3. (Denmark) Anders Antonsen (first round)
4. (Chinese Taipei) Chou Tien-chen (semi-finals)
5. (Malaysia) Lee Zii Jia (third round)
6. (Indonesia) Anthony Sinisuka Ginting (quarter-finals)
7. (Indonesia) Jonatan Christie (quarter-finals)
8. (Singapore) Loh Kean Yew (quarter-finals)

9. (India) Lakshya Sen (third round)
10. (Hong Kong) Ng Ka Long (third round)
11. (Denmark) Rasmus Gemke (second round)
12. (India) Srikanth Kidambi (second round)
13. (Japan) Kanta Tsuneyama (first round)
14. (Hong Kong) Lee Cheuk Yiu (third round)
15. (Chinese Taipei) Wang Tzu-wei (third round)
16. (Thailand) Kunlavut Vitidsarn (final)

Click on the seed number of a player to go to their draw section.

== Draw ==
=== Finals ===
Semi-finals
1	(Denmark) Viktor Axelsen	21	21
4	(Chinese Taipei) Chou Tien-chen	15	17
16	(Thailand) Kunlavut Vitidsarn	22	21
(China) Zhao Junpeng	20	6

Final
1	(Denmark) Viktor Axelsen	21	21
16	(Thailand) Kunlavut Vitidsarn	5	16

=== Top half ===
==== Section 1 ====
First Round
1	(Denmark) V Axelsen	21	21
(Malaysia) Liew D	16	12
(Singapore) J Teh	13	14
(Netherlands) M Caljouw	21	21
13	(Japan) K Tsuneyama	21	16	13
(Thailand) S Thammasin	13	21	21
(Indonesia) C A Dwi Wardoyo	16	10
(Malaysia) Ng T Y	21	21
6	(Indonesia) A S Ginting	13	21	21
(Brazil) Y Coelho	21	15	12
(Mauritius) J Paul	21	21
(Mexico) L Montoya	16	16
11	(Denmark) R Gemke	21	21
(Finland) K Koljonen	10	18
(China) Shi YQ	22	21
(Azerbaijan) A R Dwicahyo	20	10

Second Round
1	(Denmark) V Axelsen	21	21
(Netherlands) M Caljouw	19	10
(Thailand) S Thammasin	21	10	21
(Malaysia) Ng T Y	9	21	19
6	(Indonesia) A S Ginting	21	21
(Mauritius) J Paul	10	16
11	(Denmark) R Gemke	13	16
(China) Shi YQ	21	21

Third Round
1	(Denmark) V Axelsen	21	21
(Thailand) S Thammasin	19	16
6	(Indonesia) A S Ginting	21	13	21
(China) Shi YQ	11	21	18

Quarter-finals
1	(Denmark) V Axelsen	21	21
6	(Indonesia) A S Ginting	10	10

==== Section 2 ====
First Round
4	(Chinese Taipei) Chou T-c	21	15	21
(India) B. Sai Praneeth	15	21	15
(United States) H Shu	11	18
(Canada) J Ho-Shue	21	21
14	(Hong Kong) Lee C Y	21	21
(New Zealand) A Manota	19	13
(Czech Republic) J Louda	21	19	21
(Israel) M Zilberman	6	21	17
7	(Indonesia) J Christie	21	21
(France) T J Popov	9	11
(Thailand) K Wangcharoen	19	18
(Germany) K Schäfer	21	21
15	(Chinese Taipei) Wang T-w	21	21
(Vietnam) Nguyễn T M	8	6
(China) Lu GZ	21	13	21
(England) T Penty	9	21	14

Second Round
4	(Chinese Taipei) Chou T-c	21	21
(Canada) J Ho-Shue	15	12
14	(Hong Kong) Lee C Y	21	21
(Czech Republic) J Louda	17	12
7	(Indonesia) J Christie	21	21
(Germany) K Schäfer	4	16
15	(Chinese Taipei) Wang T-w	21	21
(China) Lu GZ	18	16

Third Round
4	(Chinese Taipei) Chou T-c	21	17	21
14	(Hong Kong) Lee C Y	16	21	18
7	(Indonesia) J Christie	24	21
15	(Chinese Taipei) Wang T-w	22	16

Quarter-finals
4	(Chinese Taipei) Chou T-c	14	21	22
7	(Indonesia) J Christie	21	11	20

=== Bottom half ===
==== Section 3 ====
First Round
(Hong Kong) Wong W K	15	22	21
(Belgium) J Carraggi	21	20	11
(South Korea) Heo K-h	15	21
10	(Hong Kong) Ng K L	21	23
(Sri Lanka) N Karunaratne	18	17
(Guatemala) K Cordón	21	21
(Spain) P Abián	12	12
8	(Singapore) Loh K Y	21	21
(Ukraine) D Bosniuk	12	17
(Japan) K Naraoka	21	21
(Indonesia) T Sugiarto	17	10
16	(Thailand) K Vitidsarn	21	21
(Sweden) F Burestedt	21	21
(Egypt) A H Elgamal	9	9
(Japan) K Nishimoto	21	21
3	(Denmark) A Antonsen	15	19

Second Round
(Hong Kong) Wong W K	16	9
10	(Hong Kong) Ng K L	21	21
(Guatemala) K Cordón	12	21	12
8	(Singapore) Loh K Y	21	11	21
(Japan) K Naraoka	18	11
16	(Thailand) K Vitidsarn	21	21
(Sweden) F Burestedt	21	7	13
(Japan) K Nishimoto	14	21	21

Third Round
10	(Hong Kong) Ng K L	11	4^{r}
8	(Singapore) Loh K Y	21	11
16	(Thailand) K Vitidsarn	21	21
(Japan) K Nishimoto	13	6

Quarter-finals
8	(Singapore) Loh K Y	12	21	8
16	(Thailand) K Vitidsarn	21	17	21

==== Section 4 ====
First Round
(Nigeria) A J Opeyori
(China) Zhao JP	w	/	o
(Republic of Ireland) N Nguyen	20	19
12	(India) S Kidambi	22	21
(Portugal) B Atilano	w	/	o
(Germany) M Weißkirchen
(France) B Leverdez	9	13
5	(Malaysia) Lee Z J	21	21
(Bulgaria) D Nikolov	11	15
(Spain) L E Peñalver	21	21
(Denmark) H-K Vittinghus	12	11
9	(India) L Sen	21	21
(Austria) L Wraber	12	11
(India) Prannoy H. S.	21	21
(Mexico) L Muñoz	16	14
2	(Japan) K Momota	21	21

Second Round
(China) Zhao JP	21	21
12	(India) S Kidambi	9	17
(Portugal) B Atilano	9	13
5	(Malaysia) Lee Z J	21	21
(Spain) L E Peñalver	17	10
9	(India) L Sen	21	21
(India) Prannoy H. S.	21	21
2	(Japan) K Momota	17	16

Third Round
(China) Zhao JP	21	11	21
5	(Malaysia) Lee Z J	19	21	19
9	(India) L Sen	21	16	17
(India) Prannoy H. S.	17	21	21

Quarter-finals
(China) Zhao JP	19	21	21
(India) Prannoy H. S.	21	6	18
