= Lakshya Sen =

Indian badminton player (born 2001)

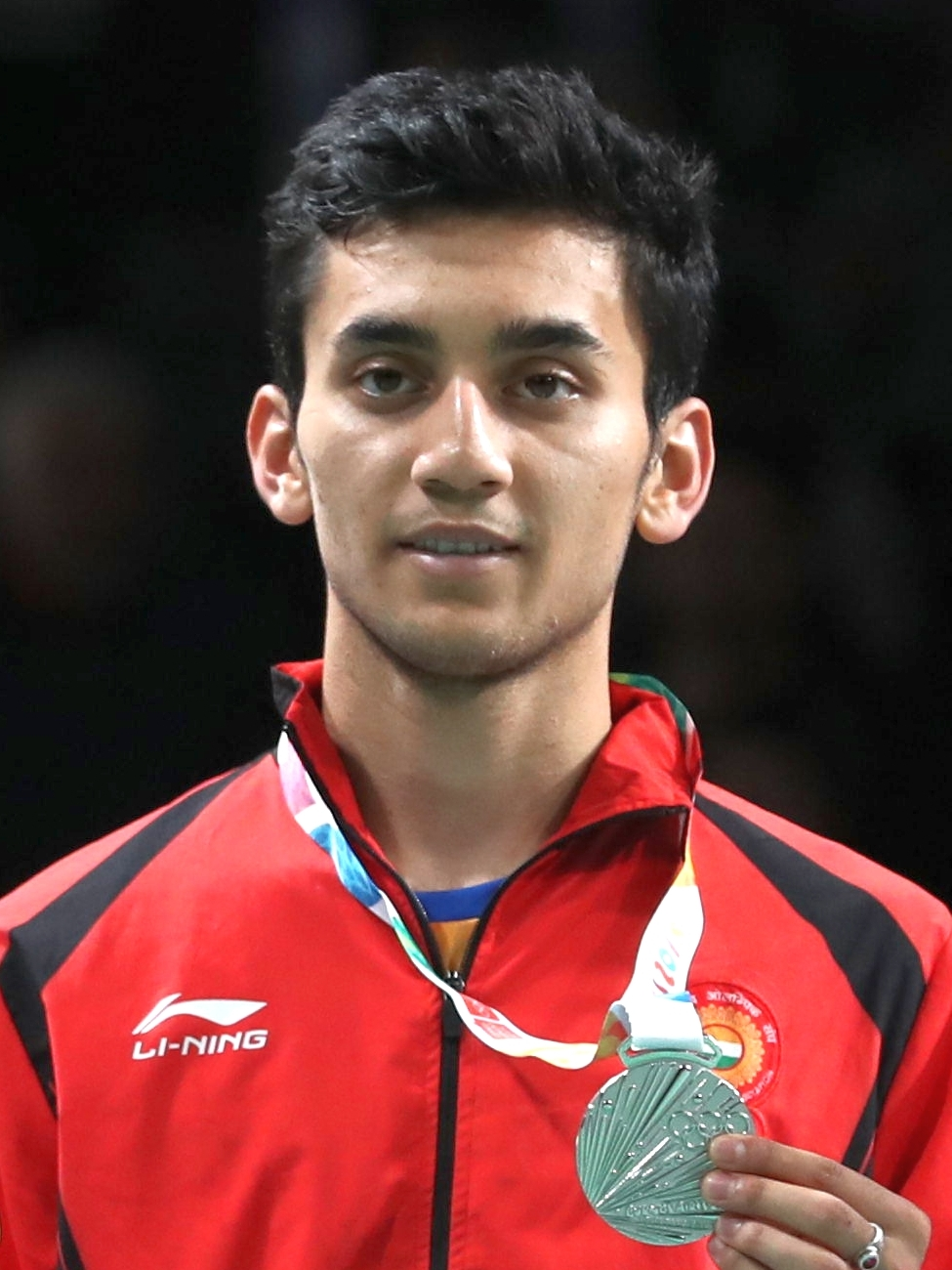
- Sen at the 2018 Youth Olympics

Personal information
- Born: 16 August 2001 (age 25) Almora, Uttarakhand, India
- Years active: 2014–present
- Height: 1.80 m (5 ft 11 in)

Sport
- Country: India
- Sport: Badminton
- Handedness: Right
- Coached by: Yoo Yong-sung; Vimal Kumar; Prakash Padukone; Park Tae-sang

Men's singles
- Career record: 237 wins, 130 losses
- Highest ranking: 6 (8 November 2022)
- Current ranking: 11 (17 November 2026)
- Honours: Arjuna Award
- BWF profile
Medal record
Men's badminton
Representing India
World Championships
Bronze medal – third place	2021 Huelva	Men's singles
Thomas Cup
Gold medal – first place	2022 Bangkok	Men's team
Bronze medal – third place	2026 Horsens	Men's team
Commonwealth Games
Gold medal – first place	2022 Birmingham	Men's singles
Silver medal – second place	2022 Birmingham	Mixed team
Asian Games
Silver medal – second place	2022 Hangzhou	Men's team
Bronze medal – third place	2026 Aichi–Nagoya	Men's team
Asia Mixed Team Championships
Bronze medal – third place	2023 Dubai	Mixed team
Asia Team Championships
Bronze medal – third place	2020 Manila	Men's team
Youth Olympic Games
Silver medal – second place	2018 Buenos Aires	Boys' singles
World Junior Championships
Bronze medal – third place	2018 Markham	Boys' singles
Asian Junior Championships
Gold medal – first place	2018 Jakarta	Boys singles
Bronze medal – third place	2016 Bangkok	Boys' singles
Representing (International Olympic Committee) Mixed-NOCs
Youth Olympic Games
Gold medal – first place	2018 Buenos Aires	Mixed team

Lakshya Sen (born 16 August 2001) is an Indian badminton player. He has won bronze at the World Championships and gold at the Commonwealth Games. Sen won gold and bronze at the Thomas Cup, and silver at the Asian and Commonwealth Games in team events. He also won bronze at the Asia Team and Asia Mixed Team Championships. Sen competed in the men's singles event at the 2024 Olympics, where he finished fourth after narrowly losing the bronze medal match.

== Early life ==
Sen was born on 16 August 2001 to parents Nirmala and Dhirendra Sen in the Almora district of Uttarakhand. They shifted to Bangalore for the sake of his badminton career. Sen is a third generation shuttler from his family. His grandfather Chandra Lal Sen and his father were badminton players. His elder brother Chirag Sen is also a professional shuttler.

== Career ==
=== 2009: Early steps ===
Sen was about ten years old when he walked into Vimal Kumar's office at the Karnataka Badminton Association in Bengaluru, stood on his toes to reach the table and gave him a handwritten note with scoreline details. He wanted to join the academy to get better at badminton to beat his opponents.

=== 2016: Junior level tournaments ===
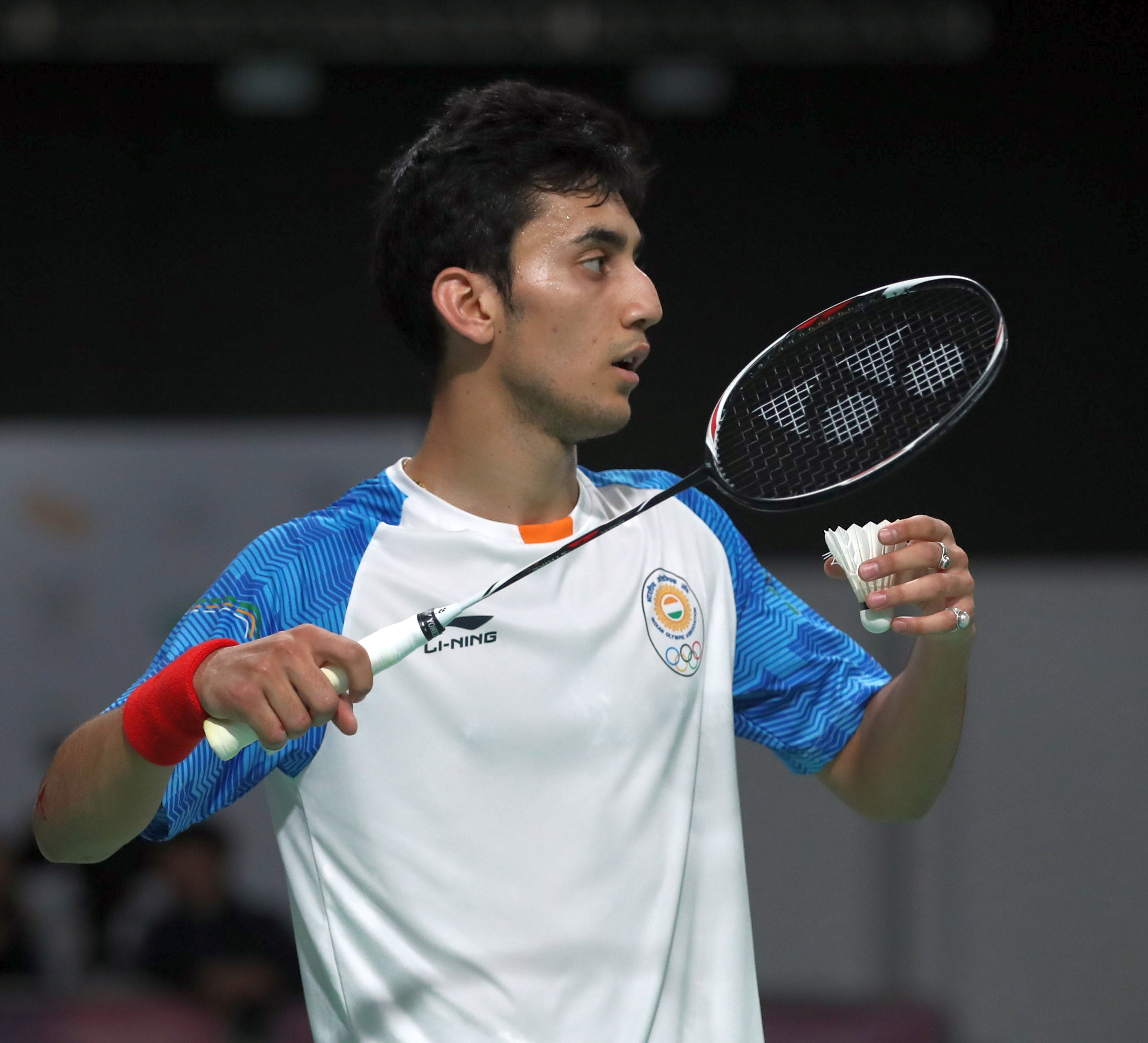

Having trained at the Prakash Padukone Badminton Academy, Sen showed his talent as a badminton player at a young age. In 2014, he won the Swiss Junior International. He also had a brilliant year in the 2016 junior badminton circuit. He won the bronze medal at the Junior Asian Championship after losing to Sun Feixiang 12–21, 16–21. Coincidently, Sen lost to Sun again in the pre-quarters of Junior World Championship 21–17, 8–21 and 13–21. His team finished 8th in the team event. Sen then competed at the senior international level and won the 2016 India International Series tournament title.

=== 2017: World junior #1 ===
Sen started off at Syed Modi International where he lost in pre-quarters to compatriot Sourabh Verma 14–21, 16–21. He then became the number one junior singles player in BWF World Junior ranking in February 2017. At the Junior Asian Championship, Sen was seeded as No.1 but lost in the pre-quarters to Lin Chun-yi 21–13, 23–25 and 20–22. Sen reached the Quarter-finals of Vietnam Open before losing to Kodai Naraoka 21–17, 21–23 and 10–21. Sen was then seeded as No. 2 at the Junior World Championship but in the quarter-finals, he lost to Kodai Naraoka 21–14, 17–21, 14–21.

=== 2018: Asian Junior Champion and Youth Olympics medalist ===
Sen defeated Cheam June Wei, a much higher ranked player than him 21–11, 21–16 in straight games at the New Zealand Open but lost to 2 time Olympic gold medallist and seed No.1 Lin Dan 21–15, 15–21 and 12–21. At the Australian Open, he lost to seed No.7 Lee Cheuk Yiu 20–22, 21–13 and 19–21. Sen emerged as the champion at the 2018 Asian Junior Championships defeating the top seeded World Junior No. 1 Kunlavut Vitidsarn in the final 21–19, 21–18.

At the Hyderabad Open, Sen lost to seed No. 8 Heo Kwang-hee 13–21 and 12–21. Sen defeated seed No.2 Sitthikom Thammasin 21–14, 21–19 at the 2018 Indonesia Masters but lost to seed No.7 Lin Yu-hsien 21–12, 20–21 and 14–21 in the Quarter-finals.

Sen participated at the 2018 Summer Youth Olympics as the fourth seeded. He settled for the silver medal in the boys' singles after losing to Chinese player Li Shifeng in straight games 15–21, 19–21. He also competed in the mixed team event, and helped team Alpha win the gold medal.

Sen clinched the bronze medal at the BWF Junior World Championships after losing to the eventual champion Kunlavut Vitidsarn in the semi-finals 22–20, 16–21, 13–21.

=== 2019–2021: Back-to-back tour titles ===
Sen won the 2019 Belgian International tournament by beating Victor Svendsen 21–14 and 21–15. He clinched his first BWF Tour title by winning the Dutch Open title after beating Yusuke Onodera of Japan. In November, he won the Hylo Open held in Saarbrücken, Germany. He defeated China's Weng Hongyang to claim the title. He won the 2019 Scottish Open next, with a victory against Brazilian Ygor Coelho.

Sen was a member of the Indian team which clinched the bronze at 2020 Badminton Asia Team Championships. He reached the 2nd round of 2020 All England Open, his first BWF Super 1000 Tournament before losing to champion and world No.1 Viktor Axelsen 17–21 and 18–21. He lost to Hans-Kristian Vittinghus 21–15, 7–21 and 15–21 in 2nd round of the 2020 Denmark Open. Sen was seeded as No.2 at 2020 Hylo Open but withdrew due to an injury. The Covid-19 pandemic restricted him from playing more international BWF tournaments that year.

In December, he reached the semifinal of the 2021 World Championships where he lost to compatriot Srikanth Kidambi in a hard-fought match 21–17, 14–21, 17–21 and settled for a bronze medal during the edition.

=== 2022: Thomas Cup victory and Commonwealth gold ===
In January, he defeated the reigning world champion Loh Kean Yew in the India Open final, thus clinching his first Super 500 title. Sen defeated him in two straight games 24–22, 21–17. In the German Open, Sen defeated World No.1 Viktor Axelsen in the semifinals, but lost the finals to Kunlavut Vitidsarn. He then defeated World No. 3 Anders Antonsen and World No. 7 Lee Zii Jia to reach the finals of the 2022 All England Open. He lost the finals to Viktor Axelsen 10–21, 15–21.

Sen was a part of the men's team for 2022 Thomas Cup. The team went on to win the final by beating Indonesia 3–0, with him winning his match against Anthony Sinisuka Ginting. He became the Commonwealth champion at the 2022 Commonwealth Games, defeating Ng Tze Yong of Malaysia in the final. Sen was also a part of the team that won the silver in the mixed team event.

=== 2023: Canada Open title and Asian Games silver ===
In February, Sen was a member of the Indian team that clinched the bronze medal at Asia Mixed Team Championships. In July, he defeated China's Li Shifeng in straight sets 21–18, 22–20 in the finals and won the 2023 Canada Open. Sen was a part of the team that won the silver medal in the men's team event at 2022 Asian Games.

=== 2024: 4th at Paris Olympics ===
Sen participated in the Olympic Games held in Paris. He defeated third seeded Jonatan Christie in the group stage and progressed to the knockout stage. After winning against his compatriot Prannoy H. S. in the round of 16, he defeated Chou Tien-chen in the quarter finals. However he was stopped by the second seeded Viktor Axelsen in the semifinal stage. He finished fourth after losing the bronze medal match to Lee Zii Jia, scripting the best ever performance by a male badminton player from India. Post his journey at the Olympics, Sen won the S300 title of Syed Modi International by defeating Singaporean Jason Teh 21–6, 21–7 in a dominating match. He ended the year by winning the bronze medal at the inaugural Kings Cup hosted by icon Lin Dan.

=== 2025–now: Australian Open champion ===
At the 2025 All England Open, he started off with a tricky win against Su Li-yang. He carried the momentum forward in the next round where he faced defending champion Jonatan Christie. Sen won in straight sets with a scoreline of 21–13, 21–10. Through the year, he had few early exits but managed to get to Hong Kong Open final and Denmark Open as well as Hylo Open quarter-finals. His first title of the year came at Australian Open when he beat Yushi Tanaka 21–15, 21–11 to clinch the awaited title.

== Coaching ==
Vimal Kumar is his coach while former player Prakash Padukone is his mentor. For brief periods of time, Sen has been coached by Yoo Yong-sung. He has also undergone training stints under Morten Frost and Peter Gade. His conditioning coach is Paddy Upton. In addition to his training sessions, Sen takes on ice baths, steam and sauna, and joint mobilisation work routines.

== Awards and nominations ==
Year	Award	Category	Result	Ref
2019	Indian Sports Honours	Emerging Sportsman of the Year	Nominated	
2022	Arjuna Award	Outstanding Performance in Sports	Won	
2023	Sportstar Awards	Sportsman of the Year Racquet Sports	Won	
2023	Times of India Sports Awards	Singles Player of the Year Male	Nominated	
2023	Indian Sports Honours	Emerging Sportsman of the Year	Won	
2023	Indian Sports Honours	Electrifying Performance of the Year	Nominated	
2025	Times of India Sports Awards	Badminton Player of the Year Male	TBA	
2026	Times of India Sports Awards	Badminton Player of the Year Male	Won	

== Achievements ==
=== World Championships ===
Men's singles
Year	Venue	Opponent	Score	Result
2021	Palacio de los Deportes Carolina Marín; Huelva, Spain	(India) Srikanth Kidambi	21–17, 14–21, 17–21	Bronze

=== Commonwealth Games ===
Men's singles
Year	Venue	Opponent	Score	Result
2022	National Exhibition Centre; Birmingham, England	(Malaysia) Ng Tze Yong	19–21, 21–9, 21–16	Gold

=== Youth Olympic Games ===
Boys' singles
Year	Venue	Opponent	Score	Result
2018	Tecnópolis; Buenos Aires, Argentina	(China) Li Shifeng	15–21, 19–21	(silver) Silver

=== World Junior Championships ===
Boys' singles
Year	Venue	Opponent	Score	Result
2018	Markham Pan Am Centre; Markham, Canada	(Thailand) Kunlavut Vitidsarn	22–20, 16–21, 13–21	Bronze

=== Asia Junior Championships ===
Boys' singles
Year	Venue	Opponent	Score	Result
2016	CPB Badminton Training Center; Bangkok, Thailand	(China) Sun Feixiang	12–21, 16–21	Bronze
2018	Jaya Raya Sports Hall Training Center; Jakarta, Indonesia	(Thailand) Kunlavut Vitidsarn	21–19, 21–18	Gold

=== World Tour (8 titles, 4 runners-up) ===
The World Tour was announced on 19 March 2017 and implemented in 2018. It's a series of badminton tournaments sanctioned by the Badminton World Federation. The BWF World Tour is divided into levels of World Tour Finals, Super 1000, Super 750, Super 500, Super 300, and the BWF Tour Super 100.

Men's singles
Year	Tournament	Level	Opponent	Score	Result	Ref.
2019	Dutch Open	Super 100	(Japan) Yusuke Onodera	15–21, 21–14, 21–15	(gold) Winner	
2019	Hylo Open	Super 100	(China) Weng Hongyang	17–21, 21–18, 21–16	(gold) Winner	
2022	India Open	Super 500	(Singapore) Loh Kean Yew	24–22, 21–17	(gold) Winner	
2022	German Open	Super 300	(Thailand) Kunlavut Vitidsarn	18–21, 15–21	(silver) Runner–up	
2022	All England Open	Super 1000	(Denmark) Viktor Axelsen	10–21, 15–21	(silver) Runner–up	
2023	Canada Open	Super 500	(China) Li Shifeng	21–18, 22–20	(gold) Winner	
2024	Syed Modi International	Super 300	(Singapore) Jason Teh	21–6, 21–7	(gold) Winner	
2025	Hong Kong Open	Super 500	(China) Li Shifeng	15–21, 12–21	(silver) Runner–up	
2025	Australian Open	Super 500	(Japan) Yushi Tanaka	21–15, 21–11	(gold) Winner	
2026	All England Open	Super 1000	(Chinese Taipei) Lin Chun-yi	15–21, 20–22	(silver) Runner–up	
2026	Hylo Open	Super 500	(Indonesia) Jonatan Christie	21–17, 21–10	(gold) Winner	
2026	Japan Masters	Super 500	(Japan) Koki Watanabe	13–21, 21–18, 21–14	(gold) Winner	

=== International Challenge / Series (7 titles, 3 runners-up) ===
Men's singles
Year	Tournament	Opponent	Score	Result
2016	India International Series	(Malaysia) Lee Zii Jia	11–13, 11–3, 11–6	(gold) Winner
2017	Bulgarian Open	(Croatia) Zvonimir Đurkinjak	18–21, 21–12, 21–17	(gold) Winner
2017	India International Series	(Malaysia) Chong Yee Han	21–15, 17–21, 21–17	(gold) Winner
2017	India International Challenge	(Thailand) Sitthikom Thammasin	21–15, 14–21, 19–21	(silver) Runner–up
2018	India International Challenge	(Thailand) Kunlavut Vitidsarn	21–15, 21–10	(gold) Winner
2019	Polish Open	(Thailand) Kunlavut Vitidsarn	17–21, 14–21	(silver) Runner–up
2019	Belgian International	(Denmark) Victor Svendsen	21–14, 21–15	(gold) Winner
2019	Scottish Open	(Brazil) Ygor Coelho	18–21, 21–18, 21–19	(gold) Winner
2019	Bangladesh International	(Malaysia) Leong Jun Hao	22–20, 21–18	(gold) Winner
2021	Dutch Open	(Singapore) Loh Kean Yew	12–21, 16–21	(silver) Runner–up

BWF International Challenge tournament
BWF International Series tournament
BWF Future Series tournament

=== Junior International (2 titles, 1 runner-up) ===
Boys' singles
Year	Tournament	Opponent	Score	Result
2014	Swiss Junior International	(India) B. M. Rahul Bharadwaj	11–5, 11–6, 6–11, 11–6	(gold) Winner
2015	India Junior International	(India) Chirag Sen	21–18, 21–15	(gold) Winner
2017	German Junior International	(Chinese Taipei) Lee Chia-hao	21–19, 11–21, 18–21	(silver) Runner–up

BWF Junior International Grand Prix tournament
BWF Junior International Challenge tournament
BWF Junior International Series tournament
BWF Junior Future Series tournament

== Performance timeline ==
Key

W	Won	F	Finalist	SF	Semi-finalist
QF	Quarter-finalist	#R	Rounds 4, 3, 2, 1	RR	Round-robin stage
Q#	Qualification round	A	Absent	w/d	Withdrew
G	Gold	S	Silver	B	Bronze
NH	Not held	N/A	Not applicable	DNQ	Did not qualify

=== Tournaments ===
Senior events

Tournament	2018	2019	2020	2021	2022	2023	2024	2025	2026
Individual
Olympic Games	NH	NH	A	NH	NH	NH	4th	NH	NH
World Championships	A	A	NH	B	3R	3R	NH	1R	2R
Asian Championships	A	A	NH	NH	1R	1R	1R	1R	1R
Asian Games	A	NH	NH	NH	A	NH	NH	NH	2R
Commonwealth Games	A	NH	NH	NH	G	NH	NH	NH	NH
Team
Thomas Cup	GS	NH	A	NH	G	NH	QF	NH	B
Sudirman Cup	NH	A	NH	A	NH	A	NH	GS	NH
Asian Games	A	NH	NH	NH	S	NH	NH	NH	B
Asian Team Championships	A	NH	B	NH	A	NH	QF	NH	QF
Asian Mixed Championships	NH	A	NH	NH	NH	B	NH	QF	NH
Commonwealth Games	A	NH	NH	NH	S	NH	NH	NH	NH

Junior events

Tournament	2016	2017	2018
Individual
Olympic Games	NH	NH	S
World Championships	4R	QF	B
Asian Championships	B	4R	G
Team
World Championships	QF	QF	QF
Asian Championships	QF	2R	QF

=== World Tour ===
Tournament	Prix	World Tour									Best	Ref
Tournament	2017	2018	2019	2020	2021	2022	2023	2024	2025	2026	Best	Ref
Malaysia Open	A			NH		A	1R	1R	1R	2R	2R ('26)	
India Open	A			NH		W	2R	1R	1R	QF	W ('22)	
Indonesia Masters	NH	A		Q1	2R	QF	QF	2R	2R	QF	QF ('22, '23, '26)	
German Open	A			NH		F	1R	A			F ('22)	
All England Open	A			2R	QF	F	2R	SF	QF	F	F ('22,26)	
Ruichang China Masters	N/A	A	SF	NH			A				SF ('19)	
Swiss Open	A			NH	1R	w/d	1R	2R	A		2R ('24)	
Orléans Masters	N/A	A	1R	NH	A						1R ('19)	
Thailand Open	A				NH	A	SF	A	1R	QF	SF ('23)	
Malaysia Masters	A			Q1	NH	A	2R	A		1R	2R ('23)	
Singapore Open	A			NH		A	1R	1R	1R	QF	QF ('26)	
Indonesia Open	A			NH	1R	1R	2R	QF	1R	1R	QF ('24)	
Australian Open	A	1R	Q2	NH		w/d	1R	A	W	A	W ('25)	
Macau Open	A			NH			N/A	A	SF	A	SF ('25)	
U.S. Open	A		2R	NH			SF	A		w/d	SF ('23)	
Canada Open	A		2R	NH		A	W	w/d	A		W ('23)	
Japan Open	A			NH		1R	SF	A	2R	1R	SF ('23)	
China Open	A			NH			1R	A	1R	2R	2R ('26)	
China Masters	A			NH			1R	QF	1R	1R	QF ('24)	
Indonesia Masters S100	N/A	QF	A	NH		A					QF ('18)	
Vietnam Open	3R	A		NH		A					3R ('17)	
Arctic Open	N/A						A	2R	1R	A	2R ('24)	
Denmark Open	A			2R	2R	QF	1R	1R	QF	1R	QF ('22, '25)	
French Open	A			NH	QF	1R	1R	SF	1R	1R	SF ('24)	
Hylo Open	A		W	w/d	SF	1R	A		QF	W	W ('19, '26)	
Korea Open	A			NH		2R	A			w/d	2R ('22)	
Japan Masters	N/A						1R	1R	SF	W	W ('24)	
Hong Kong Open	A			NH			A		F		F ('25)	
Syed Modi International	3R	A	2R	NH		w/d	A	W	A		W ('24)	
World Tour Finals	DNQ				SF	DNQ					SF ('21)	
Dutch Open	A		W	NH	N/A						W ('19)	
Hyderabad Open	N/A	2R	1R	NH							2R ('18)	
New Zealand Open	A	2R	1R	NH							2R ('18)	
Spain Masters	N/A	A	Q1	A		NH	A	w/d	NH		Q1 ('19)	
Year-end ranking	87	109	32	27	17	7	16	12	13		6	

== Record against opponents ==
Record against Year-end Finals finalists, World Championships semi-finalists, and Olympic quarter-finalists. Accurate as of 17 November 2026.

Player	Matches	Win	Lost	Diff
(Canada) Victor Lai	4	1	3	–2
(China) Lin Dan	2	0	2	–2
(China) Shi Yuqi	7	2	5	–3
(China) Zhao Junpeng	1	1	0	+1
(Chinese Taipei) Chou Tien-chen	10	5	5	0
(Denmark) Viktor Axelsen	9	1	8	–7
(Denmark) Anders Antonsen	8	3	5	–2
(France) Christo Popov	8	6	2	+4
(France) Alex Lanier	2	0	2	–2
(Guatemala) Kevin Cordón	2	2	0	+2
(India) Srikanth Kidambi	3	0	3	–3
(India) Parupalli Kashyap	1	1	0	+1

Player	Matches	Win	Lost	Diff
(India) Prannoy H. S.	9	6	3	+3
(Indonesia) Anthony Sinisuka Ginting	3	3	0	+3
(Japan) Kento Momota	3	1	2	–1
(Japan) Kodai Naraoka	9	3	6	–3
(Malaysia) Lee Zii Jia	7	5	2	+3
(Singapore) Loh Kean Yew	12	7	5	+2
(South Korea) Heo Kwang-hee	2	0	2	–2
(South Korea) Son Wan-ho	1	0	1	–1
(Thailand) Kunlavut Vitidsarn	13	5	8	–3
(Thailand) Kantaphon Wangcharoen	6	4	2	+2

== See also ==
- Badminton in India
- India national badminton team
