= 2018 Badminton Asia Junior Championships – Boys' singles =

Tournament details
- Dates: 18–22 July 2018
- Edition: 21
- Venue: Jaya Raya Sports Hall Training Center
- Location: Jakarta, Indonesia

The boys' singles tournament of the 2018 Badminton Asia Junior Championships was held from July 18 to 22. Leong Jun Hao from Malaysia clinched this title in the last edition. Thailand’s reigning World Junior Champion Kunlavut Vitidsarn leads the seedings this year.

== Seeded ==
1. (Thailand) Kunlavut Vitidsarn (final)
2. (China) Li Shifeng (quarterfinals)
3. (China) Bai Yupeng (semifinals)
4. (Indonesia) Ikhsan Rumbay (semifinals)
5. (Chinese Taipei) Chen Shiau-cheng (third round)
6. (India) Lakshya Sen (champion)
7. (Indonesia) Alberto Alvin Yulianto (quarterfinals)
8. (Chinese Taipei) Su Li-yang (second round)
9. (Kazakhstan) Dmitriy Panarin (second round)
10. (Indonesia) Karono (fourth round)
11. (Thailand) Saran Jamsri (fourth round)
12. (Singapore) Joel Koh (fourth round)
13. (Vietnam) Nguyễn Hải Đăng (second round)
14. (Chinese Taipei) Yu Sheng-po (third round)
15. (Malaysia) Ng Tze Yong (quarterfinals)
16. (India) Kiran George (fourth round)

== Draw ==
=== Finals ===
Quarterfinals
1	(Thailand) Kunlavut Vitidsarn	23	21
(Indonesia) Christian Adinata	21	8
3	(China) Bai Yupeng	21	22
7	(Indonesia) Alberto Alvin Yulianto	15	20
15	(Malaysia) Ng Tze Yong	14	19
4	(Indonesia) Ikhsan Rumbay	21	21
6	(India) Lakshya Sen	21	21
2	(China) Li Shifeng	14	12

Semifinals
1	(Thailand) Kunlavut Vitidsarn	21	21
3	(China) Bai Yupeng	14	12
4	(Indonesia) Ikhsan Rumbay	7	14
6	(India) Lakshya Sen	21	21

Final
1	(Thailand) Kunlavut Vitidsarn	19	18
6	(India) Lakshya Sen	21	21

=== Top half ===
==== Section 1 ====
First round

Second round
1	(Thailand) K Vitidsarn	21	21
(Vietnam) Nguyễn Ả G H	9	8
(Sri Lanka) C Dias	14	12
(Singapore) D Ng	21	21
10	(Indonesia) Karono	21	16	21
(India) A F Sanjay	16	21	17
(Bangladesh) A Solaiman	6	8
(Japan) H Nakayama	21	21

Third round
1	(Thailand) K Vitidsarn	21	21
(Singapore) D Ng	16	12
10	(Indonesia) Karono	21	14	28
(Japan) H Nakayama	18	21	26

Fourth round
1	(Thailand) K Vitidsarn	21	21
10	(Indonesia) Karono	16	9

==== Section 2 ====
First round
(Saudi Arabia) A Alothman	5	6
(Indonesia) C Adinata	21	21

Second round
5	(Chinese Taipei) Chen S-c	21	21
(Iran) A Karami	7	14
(Hong Kong) J Gunawan	11	13
(Malaysia) Chia W J	21	21
9	(Kazakhstan) D Panarin	19	15
(South Korea) Park H-s	21	21
(China) Liu L	19	20
(Indonesia) C Adinata	21	22

Third round
5	(Chinese Taipei) Chen S-c	21	18	19
(Malaysia) Chia W J	17	21	21
(South Korea) Park H-s	15	15
(Indonesia) C Adinata	21	21

Fourth round
(Malaysia) Chia W J	14	18
(Indonesia) C Adinata	21	21

==== Section 3 ====
First round

Second round
3	(China) Bai YP	21	21
(Sri Lanka) L De Silva	8	13
(Bangladesh) M A H Lukman	21	21
(Mongolia) T Gombodorj	11	6
14	(Chinese Taipei) Yu S-p	21	21
(Saudi Arabia) N Alghamdi	4	3
(Singapore) N Yap	17	13
(Thailand) S Piyawatcharavijit	21	21

Third round
3	(China) Bai YP	21	21
(Bangladesh) M A H Lukman	6	6
14	(Chinese Taipei) Yu S-p	18	11
(Thailand) S Piyawatcharavijit	21	21

Fourth round
3	(China) Bai YP	19	21	21
(Thailand) S Piyawatcharavijit	21	14	12

==== Section 4 ====
First round
(Japan) T Kato	21	21
(Vietnam) Nguyễn T T	9	15

Second round
7	(Indonesia) A A Yulianto	21	21
(Hong Kong) J Wang	7	16
(Myanmar) Kaung M H	6	5
(Macau) Pui P F	21	21
16	(India) K George	24	21
(Malaysia) Lim C K	22	16
(South Korea) Choi J-h	21	21
(Japan) T Kato	13	17

Third round
7	(Indonesia) A A Yulianto	21	21
(Macau) Pui P F	15	8
16	(India) K George	21	21	21
(South Korea) Choi J-h	16	23	12

Fourth round
7	(Indonesia) A A Yulianto	21	21
16	(India) K George	19	19

=== Bottom half ===
==== Section 5 ====
First round
(Myanmar) Kaung A	21	17	21
(Saudi Arabia) M Alghamdi	16	21	10

Second round
(Myanmar) Kaung A	5	3
(Hong Kong) Ko S H	21	21
(Mongolia) S Enkhbat	13	10
15	(Malaysia) Ng T Y	21	21
(Sri Lanka) V Fernando	8	4
(India) P Rajawat	21	21
(Japan) R Ichii	21	21
8	(Chinese Taipei) Su L-y	17	17

Third round
(Hong Kong) Ko S H	18	14
15	(Malaysia) Ng T Y	21	21
(India) P Rajawat	21	13	23
(Japan) R Ichii	18	21	21

Fourth round
15	(Malaysia) Ng T Y	21	21
(India) P Rajawat	15	14

==== Section 6 ====
First round

Second round
(Macau) Ao F L	14	12
(Bangladesh) S S M S Ullah	21	21
(Kazakhstan) K Tajibullayev	7	8
12	(Singapore) J Koh	21	21
(South Korea) Lee H-j	14	17
(Thailand) P Srimanta	21	21
(China) Cao YF	8	22
4	(Indonesia) I Rumbay	21	24

Third round
(Bangladesh) S S M S Ullah	12	7
12	(Singapore) J Koh	21	21
(Thailand) P Srimanta	12	12
4	(Indonesia) I Rumbay	21	21

Fourth round
12	(Singapore) J Koh	18	11
4	(Indonesia) I Rumbay	21	21

==== Section 7 ====
First round
(Indonesia) S P Belawa	21	21
(Myanmar) Zwe Y N	4	6

Second round
(Indonesia) S P Belawa	21	21
(Malaysia) Kok J H	15	14
(Hong Kong) Mak P N	21	18	15
11	(Thailand) S Jamsri	9	21	21
(Bangladesh) G Singha	11	1
(Japan) R Hatano	21	21
(South Korea) Kim H-j	13	11
6	(India) L Sen	21	21

Third round
(Indonesia) S P Belawa	19	21	17
11	(Thailand) S Jamsri	21	19	21
(Japan) R Hatano	6	21	15
6	(India) L Sen	21	18	21

Fourth round
11	(Thailand) S Jamsri	15	16
6	(India) L Sen	21	21

==== Section 8 ====
First round

Second round
(Saudi Arabia) A Alharthi	2	3
(Indonesia) Y Ramlie	21	21
(Chinese Taipei) Yang Y	9	21	21
13	(Vietnam) Nguyễn H Đ	21	15	9
(Kazakhstan) D Abdullayev	15	12
(Sri Lanka) T Ambegoda	21	21
(Macau) Lee R H	8	5
2	(China) Li SF	21	21

Third round
(Indonesia) Y Ramlie	13	13
(Chinese Taipei) Yang Y	21	21
(Sri Lanka) T Ambegoda	12	15
2	(China) Li SF	21	21

Fourth round
(Chinese Taipei) Yang Y	10	17
2	(China) Li SF	21	21
