= Viktor Axelsen =

Danish badminton player (born 1994)

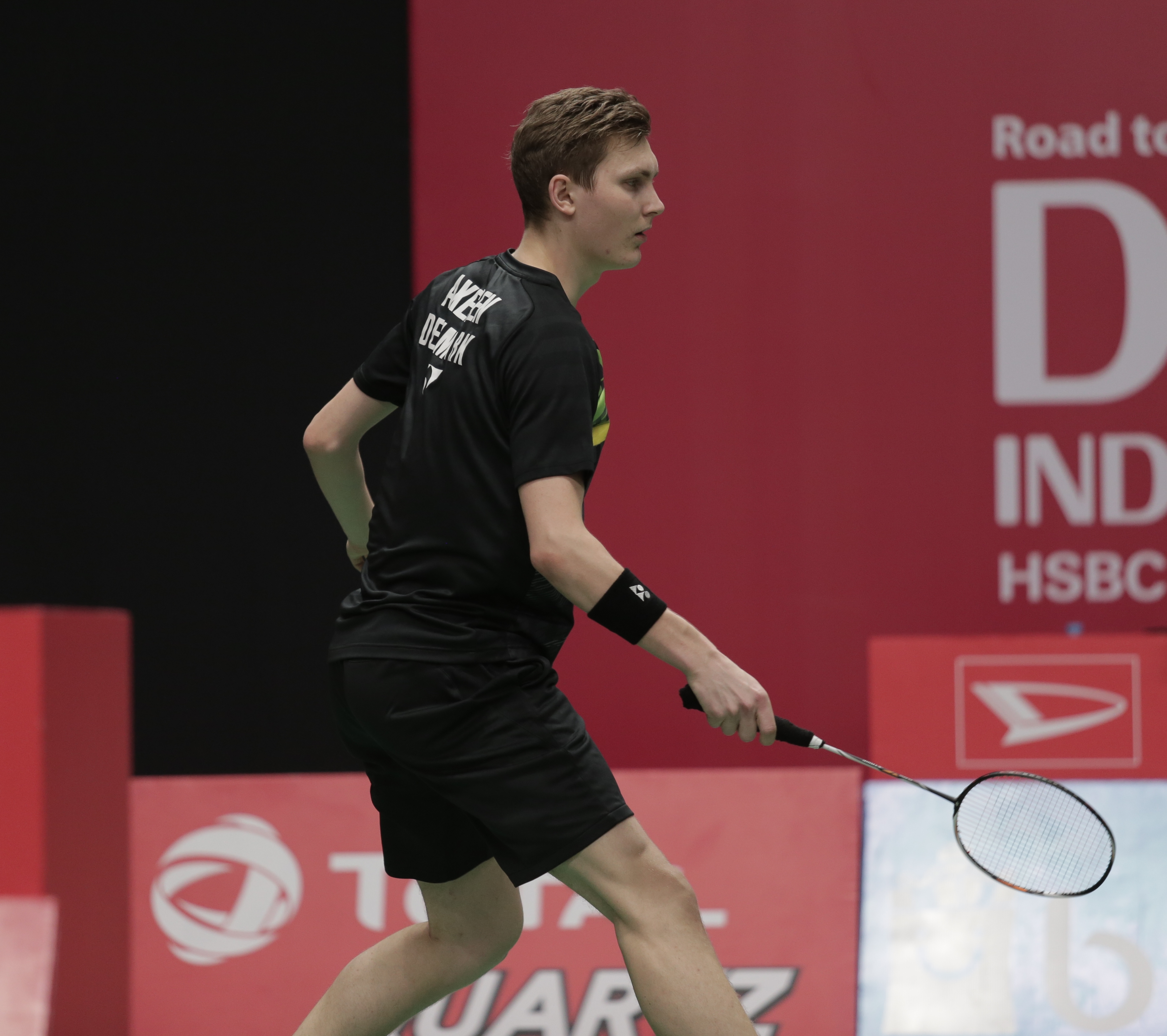
- Axelsen at the 2018 Indonesia Masters

Personal information
- Born: 4 January 1994 (age 32) Odense, Denmark
- Years active: 2010–2026
- Height: 1.94 m (6 ft 4 in)

Sport
- Country: Denmark
- Sport: Badminton
- Handedness: Right
- Coached by: Peter Gade; Henrik Rohde
- Retired: 15 April 2026

Men's singles
- Career record: 572 wins, 160 losses
- Highest ranking: 1 (28 September 2017)
- BWF profile
Medal record
Men's badminton
Representing Denmark
Olympic Games
Gold medal – first place	2020 Tokyo	Men's singles
Gold medal – first place	2024 Paris	Men's singles
Bronze medal – third place	2016 Rio de Janeiro	Men's singles
World Championships
Gold medal – first place	2017 Glasgow	Men's singles
Gold medal – first place	2022 Tokyo	Men's singles
Bronze medal – third place	2014 Copenhagen	Men's singles
Sudirman Cup
Bronze medal – third place	2013 Kuala Lumpur	Mixed team
Thomas Cup
Gold medal – first place	2016 Kunshan	Men's team
Bronze medal – third place	2012 Wuhan	Men's team
Bronze medal – third place	2018 Bangkok	Men's team
Bronze medal – third place	2020 Aarhus	Men's team
Bronze medal – third place	2022 Bangkok	Men's team
European Games
Gold medal – first place	2023 Kraków–Małopolska	Men's singles
European Championships
Gold medal – first place	2016 La Roche-sur-Yon	Men's singles
Gold medal – first place	2018 Huelva	Men's singles
Gold medal – first place	2022 Madrid	Men's singles
Silver medal – second place	2021 Kyiv	Men's singles
Bronze medal – third place	2012 Karlskrona	Men's singles
Bronze medal – third place	2014 Kazan	Men's singles
Bronze medal – third place	2017 Kolding	Men's singles
Bronze medal – third place	2024 Saarbrücken	Men's singles
European Mixed Team Championships
Gold medal – first place	2015 Leuven	Mixed team
Gold medal – first place	2017 Lubin	Mixed team
Gold medal – first place	2019 Copenhagen	Mixed team
Gold medal – first place	2021 Vantaa	Mixed team
Gold medal – first place	2023 Aire-sur-la-Lys	Mixed team
Gold medal – first place	2025 Baku	Mixed team
Silver medal – second place	2013 Moscow	Mixed team
European Team Championships
Gold medal – first place	2012 Amsterdam	Men's team
Gold medal – first place	2014 Basel	Men's team
Gold medal – first place	2016 Kazan	Men's team
Gold medal – first place	2018 Kazan	Men's team
Gold medal – first place	2020 Liévin	Men's team
Gold medal – first place	2024 Łódź	Men's team
World Junior Championships
Gold medal – first place	2010 Guadalajara	Boys' singles
Silver medal – second place	2011 Taipei	Boys' singles
European Junior Championships
Gold medal – first place	2011 Vantaa	Boys' singles
Bronze medal – third place	2011 Vantaa	Mixed team

Viktor Axelsen (born 4 January 1994) is a Danish former professional badminton player. He is a two-time Olympic Champion, two-time World Champion, and four-time European Champion. He has held the No. 1 BWF World Ranking in men's singles for a total of 183 weeks (as of August 2024). Throughout his career, Axelsen has won every single major title in both team and individual events at least once (World Tour Super 1000 level or higher), except for Sudirman Cup (where his team won Bronze in 2013).

Axelsen won the World Championships in 2017 and 2022, becoming the only non-Asian male player besides Thomas Lund to win the title twice. He is also the back-to-back reigning Olympic Champion, winning the gold medals in men's singles at the 2020 Tokyo Olympics and 2024 Paris Olympics after his bronze medal in 2016 Rio Olympics, thereby becoming the most successful badminton men’s singles player in Olympic history and one of the most decorated badminton players in history. He is regarded as one of the all-time greats of badminton.

Axelsen has led Denmark team to win all European Mixed Team Championships since 2015 and all European Men's Team Championships since 2012. On individual levels, he won three European Championships titles in 2016, 2018, and 2022, and a gold medal at the European Games in 2023. He also won the 2010 World Junior Championships, becoming the only non-Asian singles player to win the title. Axelsen held the world number one position in men's singles for a total of 183 weeks, making it the third-longest reign in badminton history, trailing only Lee Chong Wei (398) and Lin Dan (211). He has been the recipient of the BWF Male Player of the Year award two times, in 2021 and 2022.

== Early life ==
Axelsen was born in Odense, to Henrik Axelsen and Gitte Lundager. At six years old, his father introduced him to badminton, playing the games at the Odense badminton club. He lived with his father after his parents divorced, and then lived alone in Copenhagen at the age of 17 and joined the national team. His father ran a small advertising agency for a number of years, but now works full time as a manager for his son. His mother has a shop in central Odense with a hairdressing salon, cosmetics, and fashion clothing. He was named the 2004 Player of the Year by the Odense badminton club.

== Career ==
=== 2006–2011: Early career and World Junior title ===
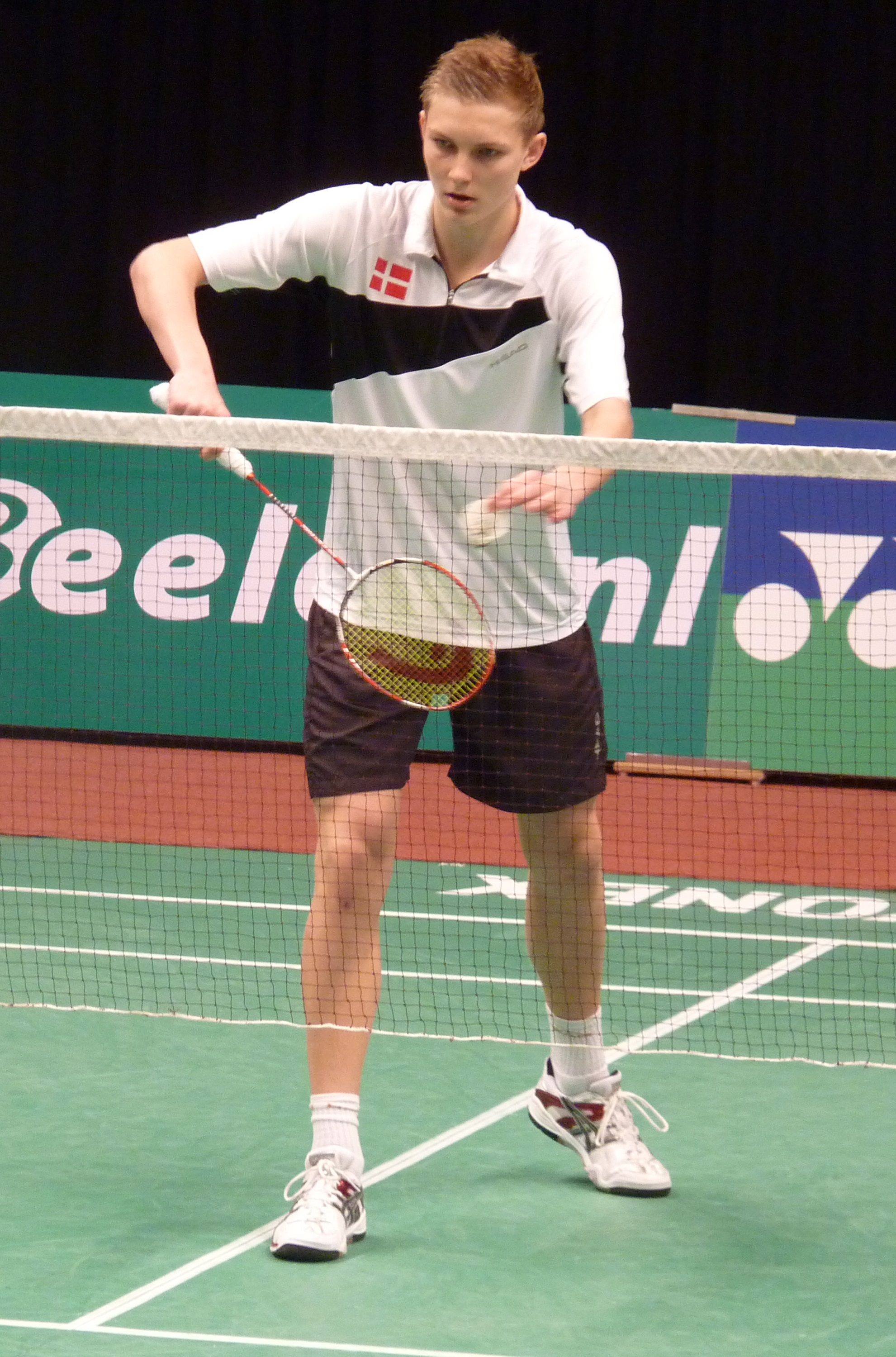
Axelsen at the 2010 Dutch Open

Axelsen's achievements began when he won the National junior event in the boys' singles and doubles in his age group in 2006 and 2008. He later emerged victorious at the 2009 German Junior and also at the European U17 Championships. He made his debut in the senior international tournament at the 2009 Denmark Open playing in the men's doubles event with Steffen Rasmussen.

In January 2010, Axelsen who played from the qualification round, manage to reach the finals at the Swedish International tournament, and finished as the runner-up after losing to Indra Bagus Ade Chandra in straight games 15–21, 12–21. He competed at the World Junior Championships in Guadalajara, Mexico, claimed the boys' singles title by defeating the No.1 seed, China's Huang Yuxiang in the quarter-finals, India's B. Sai Praneeth in the semis and Kang Ji-wook of Korea in the final. In October, he claimed his first international senior title at the age of just sixteen, winning the Cyprus International. A few weeks later he entered his first Super Series event in singles, the 2010 Denmark Open; making it through the qualifying stages before losing out to compatriot and eventual winner Jan Ø. Jørgensen in the second round.

In 2011, Axelsen secured gold at the European Junior Championships, defeating teammate Rasmus Fladberg 21–8, 17–21, 21–13 in the final. He took a silver medal at the 2011 BWF World Junior Championships, losing the title to Malaysia's Zulfadli Zulkiffli, coming in second place.

=== 2012–2014: First Grand Prix title, European and World bronze ===
In early 2012, Axelsen moved to Valby, in Copenhagen, and started training at Brøndby elite center. Axelsen finished runner-up at the French Open in Paris, losing in the final to Liew Daren 18–21, 17–21. He also won a bronze medal at the 2012 European Championships, losing the semi-final in three games to Sweden's Henri Hurskainen 21–18, 18–21, 17–21.

In 2014, Axelsen won his first Grand Prix title at the Swiss Open, beating China's Tian Houwei in the final 21–7, 16–21, 25–23. Axelsen won a bronze medal at the 2014 BWF World Championships and also a bronze medal again at the 2014 European Championships.

=== 2015–2016: European champion, Olympic bronze, and Superseries title ===
In 2015, Axelsen finished runners-up at the Swiss Open Grand Prix Gold, and three Super Series events: India Open, Australian Open, and Japan Open. He qualified to compete at the Super Series Finals held in Dubai, and again finished as the runner-up. Axelsen featured in Denmark's winning team at the European Mixed Team Championships in Leuven, Belgium. At the Sudirman Cup, the team finished in the quarter finals lost 2–3 to Japanese team, where he played in the second matches. He ended the 2015 season ranked as world number 6.

In 2016, Axelsen earned his first European crown in May 2016, beating compatriot and defending champion Jan Ø. Jørgensen with 21–11, 21–16 in the final of the 25th edition of the European Championships, the first in France at La Roche-sur-Yon. He was also part of the historic Danish team winning the first ever Thomas Cup title in 2016. Axelsen won five of his six played singles matches in the team tournament, including the match against Indonesia's experienced player Tommy Sugiarto in the final (21–17, 21–18) setting up a dramatic and historic 3–2 victory for Denmark over Indonesia. In the 2016 Rio Olympics, he won the bronze medal by beating Lin Dan from China 15–21, 21–10, 21–17.

=== 2017: World champion, second Superseries Finals title, World number 1 ===
In 2017, Axelsen won the World Championships in Glasgow in straight games against Lin Dan (22–20, 21–16) and became the third Danish player to ever become a world champion (Peter Rasmussen 1997 in Glasgow & Flemming Delfs 1977 in Sweden). Axelsen, with a record of 4–3, is the only top twenty player to hold a winning record against Lin Dan, head-to-head.

Axelsen followed up his victory in Glasgow by winning the finals of the Japan Open tournament in Tokyo over Lee Chong Wei of Malaysia in three sets on 23 September, propelling him to the top of the BWF World Rankings.

=== 2018–2019: Second European Championships title ===
In 2018, Axelsen participated in the European Men's and Women's Team Badminton Championships and got a gold after suffering from a foot injury. He represented Denmark in the 2018 Thomas & Uber Cup. In the group stage, he defeated Vladimir Malkov from Russia and from Algeria. In the group stage match against Lee Chong Wei, he lost by two straight games 9–21, 19–21. In the quarter-finals match against South Korea, he defeated Son Wan-ho, but he lost to the favorite and former world no. 2, Kento Momota in semi-finals. Denmark was then eliminated in semi-finals and failed to defend the title in the 2016 event. In August, Axelsen was unable to defend his world title where he was defeated by two-time World Champion and reigning Olympic Champion Chen Long in the quarter-finals.

=== 2020: All England Open title ===
Axelsen started the season by competing in the Indonesia Masters. He finished as the semi-finalist after losing to home player the seventh seed Anthony Sinisuka Ginting in two straight games. In February, he managed to defend his title in the Barcelona Spain Masters after beating the Thai youngster Kunlavut Vitidsarn in straight games 21–16, 21–13. In March, he won the All England Open, making history as the first European and Dane to lift the men's singles trophy since 1999.

=== 2021: Olympic gold, first Denmark Open title and "Male Player Of The Year" award ===
Axelsen participated at the European Mixed Team Championships in Finland, and helped the team to win the gold medal. In March, Axelsen entered the All England Open as the defending champion. He reached the final, but lost to 6th seed Lee Zii Jia of Malaysia in a grueling 3-game match (29–30, 22–20, 9–21). He then took part at the Kyiv European Championships, advanced to the final, but the organizers decided to cancel the finals, since Axelsen tested positive for COVID-19. Consequently, he was barred from playing the final match with his compatriot Anders Antonsen and was awarded a silver medal. He won the gold medal in the 2020 Olympic Games in Tokyo, Japan, beating the defending champion Chen Long in straight games in the final and without dropping a single game in the entire tournament.

In October, he won the Denmark Open title, defeating the top seed and world no.1 Kento Momota in a three game final match. The match lasted 93 minutes. This was Axelsen's second victory over Momota in their sixteen encounters. He then won his second super 1000 title of the year at the Indonesian Open by beating Singapore's Loh Kean Yew. For his achievements, Axelsen regained the number 1 spot at the BWF World ranking and has been named the 2020/2021 BWF Male Player of the Year. He then won the season ending of the 2021 BWF World Tour Finals, beating the current Eddy Chong Most Promising Player, Kunlavut Vitidsarn in the final in straight games.

The following month, Axelsen crashed out in the first round to the eventual World Champion Loh Kean Yew in the World Championships, losing 21–14, 9–21, 6–21 in 54 minutes.

=== 2022: Second World Championship title and "Male Player of The Year" award ===
Axelsen started the 2022 season as the world number one on the BWF World Ranking. He reached the semi-finals of the German Open 2022 where he narrowly lost in three games (13–21, 21–12, 20–22) to Indian player Lakshya Sen.

On March 20, Axelsen won the All England Open in convincing fashion without dropping a single game in the entire tournament. He defeated Lakshya Sen in the finals (21–10, 21–15).

On 30 April, Axelsen won his third European Championship by defeating compatriot Anders Antonsen, 21–17, 21–15, in Madrid, Spain. He joined Flemming Delfs, Poul-Erik Høyer and Peter Gade as Danish three-time winners in men's singles. Despite the win, Axelsen was not satisfied with the win, saying that there were many silly mistakes from both players.

On July 3, Axelsen won the Malaysia Open for the first time by defeating Kento Momota 21–4, 21–7 in the final, becoming the first Dane to win the event in 15 years. The next day, Axelsen withdrew from the 2022 Malaysia Masters, which was the next event on the tour. Axelsen then withdrew from the Singapore Open, taking a break in Singapore before moving on to the World Championships in August.

In August, Axelsen won the World Championships, defeating Thailand's three-time world junior champion Kunlavut Vitidsarn in the final, 21–5, 21–16. This was a second world championships title for Axelsen, adding on to the gold medal he won in 2017.

In mid October, Axelsen took part in his home event as the defending champion, the Denmark Open. In the quarterfinals, he lost to his training partner and former world champion Loh Kean Yew in a tame defeat, losing 17–21, 10–21 in just 30 minutes. Prior to this match, Axelsen had held a 39 match-winning streak, and his only loss in 2022 so far was to a narrow loss to Lakshya Sen in the German Open semi-final. After the match, Axelsen declared that he did not play up to his usual standard, going as far to describe his own play as "embarrassing", apologizing to the home crowd for his performance in the interview.

However, he won the French Open title, a week after the Denmark Open. He defeated Rasmus Gemke in the final, in straight games 21–14 21–15, without dropping a game in the entire tournament. For his amazing performance in this year, only losing two completed matches, he was crowned as the BWF Male Player Of The Year, for the 2nd time after winning it last year. In the World Tour Finals, which had initially been scheduled in Guangzhou but was later moved to Bangkok, number one seed Axelsen went on to become champion after defeating Anthony Sinisuka Ginting in straight sets, 21–13 21–14, ending 2022 with year-end number 1 ranking, 8 titles, and only 3 losses (out of 55 matches).

=== 2023: Continued domination despite recurring injuries — World Tour Finals title and three Super 1000 titles ===
In the inaugural tournament and Super 1000 event of the year, Malaysia Open, Viktor Axelsen successfully defended his championship title by defeating opponents Rasmus Gemke, Liew Daren, Kenta Nishimoto, and finalist Kodai Naraoka, dropping only one game in the opening round against Gemke. In the three matches leading up to the title, Axelsen did not concede a game or more than 7 points in the opening games. Subsequently, Axelsen participated in the Indian Open, a Super 750 event, where he encountered minimal resistance en route to the final. Notable victories over Srikanth Kidambi, Shi Yuqi, and Rasmus Gemke secured his place in the championship match where he was bested by the eighth seed Kunlavut Vitidsarn in the final, with a final score of 20-22, 21-10, 12-21.

In the All England Open tournament held in March, Axelsen faced an upset exit in the second round, losing to unseeded Ng Tze Yong in a closely contested three-game match. Later the same month, he advanced to the semi-finals of the Swiss Open but was defeated by Chou Tien-chen in two games. Participating in the Sudirman Cup, Axelsen helped the Denmark team reach the quarter-finals. However, Denmark suffered a 1-3 loss to Malaysia, with Axelsen sustaining a left hamstring injury during the first game against Lee Zii Jia. This injury occurred just after approximately 5 minutes of play with the score tied at 4-4.

Consequently, Axelsen opted out of the Singapore Open in June, citing the need for rehabilitation due to his muscle strain. He claimed on Twitter that the Badminton World Federation intended to fine him $5,000 for his absence, while he was engaged in recovery. However, the BWF dismissed his statement as "inaccurate and out of context". Later in the same month, despite just recovering from his injury, Axelsen participated in the Indonesia Open, a Super 1000 event, in which he successfully defended his title by overcoming opponents Weng Hongyang, Wang Tzu-wei, Chou Tien-chen, and the second-seeded local favorite Anthony Sinisuka Ginting. Notably, Axelsen achieved these victories without dropping a single game.

Moving to July, Axelsen secured a significant victory by winning the European Games men's singles title for the first time. In the final, he triumphed over the fifth-seeded Christo Popov after a three-game battle. Due to fatigue, Axelsen opted to withdraw from the Canada Open. Nonetheless, he continued his winning streak by claiming victory in the Japan Open, a Super 750 event. Axelsen achieved this feat by defeating opponents Lin Chun-yi, Chico Aura Dwi Wardoyo, Prannoy H. S., Kodai Naraoka, and the fifth-seeded Jonatan Christie.

Entering the world championship as the top seed and defending champion, Axelsen experienced an unexpected loss to the ninth seed Prannoy H. S. in the quarter-finals. Subsequently, in September, he secured his maiden China Open title, marking his third Super 1000 title of the year. The victory came in a 2-0 win over the host nation opponent, Lu Guangzu, in the finals. Axelsen strategically withdrew from the Arctic Open to preserve his energy for the Denmark Open, held in his birthplace city, Odense. Despite advancing to the second round and defeating Magnus Johannesen, he retired from the tournament.

In the French Open, Axelsen faced another setback, retiring prematurely in the first round against Ng Ka Long due to injury. Facing potential ineligibility for the World Tour Finals due to recurring injuries and retirements throughout the year, Axelsen made a comeback in November, clinching the inaugural Japan Masters title by defeating Shi Yuqi in the final. This Super 500 tournament featured the participation of all top 10 players, and Axelsen's victory propelled him to the fifth position in the race to the World Tour Finals, securing his eligibility for the event.

During the World Tour Finals, Axelsen finished second in the group stage with a single loss to Shi Yuqi. In the semi-finals, he comfortably defeated his compatriot Anders Antonsen in two games. Advancing to the final, Axelsen faced Shi Yuqi once again, overcoming an earlier defeat and the strong support of the host nation for his opponent. In a remarkable achievement, Axelsen secured his third consecutive World Tour Finals title, a feat previously accomplished only by Lee Chong Wei. The notable win at the World Tour Finals secured Axelsen a record prize of US$200,000. This propelled him ahead of the accomplished An Se-young to claim the top spot as the highest prize money earner on the circuit for the year for the second time in a row, amassing a total of US$645,095, more than any other player earning in a single year.

=== 2024: Second Olympic gold medal ===
Participating in the inaugural tournament of the season Malaysia Open, Axelsen advanced to the semi-finals after defeating Loh Kean Yew, Lee Cheuk Yiu, Ng Ka Long, respectively. In the semi-finals, he lost to Shi Yuqi after three games despite an early lead of 5–1 in the final game, therefore failing to defend his championship. Axelsen was part of the gold-winning Danish men's team at the European Men's Team Championships despite not playing a match. He was seeded number one in French Open and All England Open, however suffered upset losses against Wang Tzu-wei in the second round and Anthony Sinisuka Ginting in the quarter-finals, respectively. In April, Axelsen entered the European Championships as the top seed, effortlessly advanced to the semi-finals without dropping a game before losing to the fourth seed Toma Junior Popov in three games, therefore failing to defend his championship and ending up with a bronze medal. In the Thomas Cup, his Denmark team lost 1–3 to Chinese Taipei in the quarter-finals, in which Axelsen was defeated by Chou Tien-chen in three games.

In the Malaysia Masters, Axelsen reached the final without dropping a game against Koki Watanabe, Panitchaphon Teeraratsakul, Chou Tien-chen, and Lu Guangzu. He then went on to defeat the fifth seed Lee Zii Jia in the final match with a scoreline of 21–6, 20–22, 21–13, therefore winning his maiden BWF title of the year, which is also his second Malaysia Masters after six years. In the following tournament, Singapore Open, Axelsen withdrew ahead of the semi-final match against the sixth seed Li Shifeng, citing "a small rollover" on the right ankle. He then decided to skip all the tournaments leading up to the Olympics in order to focus on the preparations of this paramount event. This included withdrawing from Indonesia Open, where he was the defending champion, thus forfeiting 12,000 points and losing his world number one ranking to Shi Yuqi for the first time since December 2021, ending a 132-week tenure.

Entering the Paris Olympics as the second seed, Axelsen advanced effortlessly through the group stage with straight wins against unseeded players Prince Dahal, Misha Zilberman, and Nhat Nguyen. Benefiting from a favorable knockout stage draw, he received a bye to the quarter-finals, where he overcame the tenth seed Loh Kean Yew. In the a remarkable semi-final against unseeded Lakshya Sen, Axelsen saved three game points to win the first game 22–20 and overcame a 7–0 deficit to take the second game 21–14. Advancing to the final, Axelsen faced the eighth seed and reigning World Champion Kunlavut Vitidsarn, who had defeated top players Shi Yuqi and Lee Zii Jia en route to the final. Despite Vitidsarn's impressive performance leading up to the final, Axelsen secured a commanding victory with scores of 21–11, 21–11, thereby successfully defending his Olympics gold medal. This achievement made Axelsen the only non-Asian badminton player in history and the only men's singles player after Lin Dan to win two Olympic gold medals. In the month following his Olympic gold medal in Paris, he competed in the Hong Kong Open, marking his return to BWF Tour. He advanced to the final, and secured a dominant victory over unseeded Lei Lanxi, winning 21–9, 21–12. This triumph made him the first Danish men's singles player to claim the Hong Kong Open title in 27 years.

=== 2025: Back surgery, recovery and return ===
Axelsen kicked-off the 2025 season as champion in the India Open. He won his second title of the year in German Open, the first Super 300 tournament he won since 2021 and the first appearance of new coach, Peter Gade. In the All England Open, Axelsen faced a shock first round exit to Lin Chun-Yi. Shortly afterwards, he would confirm on social media that he had been experiencing severe back pain for several months and in April, Axelsen underwent Endoscopic surgery to repair a disc herniation.

September 10 would mark Axelsen's return to competition 5 months after treating his back injury, entering the Hong Kong Open to defend his title. Axelsen defeated Chou Tien-chen, Yushi Tanaka and Kunlavut Vitidsarn on his way to the semi-finals of the Denmark Open but would fall to no.1 seed Shi Yuqi 19-21, 21-17, 17-21 in a tense display where Axelsen's 'side-to-side' serve technique caused the pair to clash during and after the match. He reached the quarter finals of the French Open, losing to compatriot Anders Antonsen in a gruelling match almost clocking 90 minutes. Despite Axelsen's inspired comeback and climbing the world ranking to 19, he would withdraw from the Kumamoto Masters and Australian Open effectively ending his season early with full focus on 2026.

== Retirement ==
On 14 April 2026, Axelsen announced his retirement from 16 years of competitive badminton on his personal Instagram page due to persisting back problems. Axelsen's doctors and specialists advised him to focus on his long-term health, ultimately leading to his retirement.

== Personal life ==
In addition to his native Danish, Axelsen is also a fluent speaker of English and Mandarin, giving himself a Chinese name of 安賽龍.

In August 2021, Axelsen decided to leave the Danish national team in Copenhagen and move with his family from Denmark to Dubai. There he could train at the NAS Sports Complex (Nad Al Sheba Sports Complex). Axelsen himself stated several reasons for the move to Dubai; for instance shorter travel time to most events in Asia, which allows him more remaining time to rest or warm-up. Another reason was the health factor since he has asthma and acute rhinitis. This makes it more comfortable in Asia than in Europe, especially Denmark, which tends to be cooler and where his allergy can be triggered faster by things such as flower pollen, dust, or animal dander. And the other reason is the family factor. Axelsen wants to have more time with his family.

Axelsen's wife, Natalia Koch Rohde, gave birth to a baby girl named Vega Rohde Axelsen on 15 October 2020. On 7 October 2022, she gave birth to her second baby girl named Aya Rohde Axelsen. Her father Henrik Rohde, who was head coach of the winning Skovshoved team in the Danish league in 2017, since moving to Dubai, is also helping with the coaching of her husband Viktor Axelsen.

On 20 August 2025, Axelsen announced on his social media that he and his wife have decided to part ways on good terms.

== Achievements ==
=== Olympic Games ===
Men's singles
Year	Venue	Opponent	Score	Result
2016	Riocentro – Pavilion 4, Rio de Janeiro, Brazil	(China) Lin Dan	15–21, 21–10, 21–17	Bronze
2020	Musashino Forest Sport Plaza, Tokyo, Japan	(China) Chen Long	21–15, 21–12	Gold
2024	Porte de La Chapelle Arena, Paris, France	(Thailand) Kunlavut Vitidsarn	21–11, 21–11	Gold

=== BWF World Championships ===
Men's singles
Year	Venue	Opponent	Score	Result
2014	Ballerup Super Arena, Copenhagen, Denmark	(Malaysia) Lee Chong Wei	9–21, 7–21	Bronze
2017	Emirates Arena, Glasgow, Scotland	(China) Lin Dan	22–20, 21–16	Gold
2022	Tokyo Metropolitan Gymnasium, Tokyo, Japan	(Thailand) Kunlavut Vitidsarn	21–5, 21–16	Gold

=== European Games ===
Men's singles
Year	Venue	Opponent	Score	Result
2023	Arena Jaskółka, Tarnów, Poland	(France) Christo Popov	16–21, 21–16, 21–11	Gold

=== European Championships ===
Men's singles
Year	Venue	Opponent	Score	Result
2012	Telenor Arena, Karlskrona, Sweden	(Sweden) Henri Hurskainen	21–18, 18–21, 17–21	Bronze
2014	Gymnastics Center, Kazan, Russia	(Denmark) Jan Ø. Jørgensen	11–21, 13–21	Bronze
2016	Vendéspace, La Roche-sur-Yon, France	(Denmark) Jan Ø. Jørgensen	21–11, 21–16	Gold
2017	Sydbank Arena, Kolding, Denmark	(Denmark) Anders Antonsen	17–21, 16–21	Bronze
2018	Palacio de los Deportes Carolina Marín, Huelva, Spain	(England) Rajiv Ouseph	21–8, 21–7	Gold
2021	Palace of Sports, Kyiv, Ukraine	(Denmark) Anders Antonsen	Walkover	Silver
2022	Polideportivo Municipal Gallur, Madrid, Spain	(Denmark) Anders Antonsen	21–17, 21–15	Gold
2024	Saarlandhalle, Saarbrücken, Germany	(France) Toma Junior Popov	19–21, 21–17, 9–21	Bronze

=== BWF World Junior Championships ===
Boys' singles
Year	Venue	Opponent	Score	Result
2010	Domo del Code Jalisco, Guadalajara, Mexico	(South Korea) Kang Ji-Wook	21–19, 21–10	Gold
2011	Taoyuan Arena, Taoyuan City, Taipei, Taiwan	(Malaysia) Zulfadli Zulkiffli	18–21, 21–9, 19–21	Silver

=== European Junior Championships ===
Boys' singles
Year	Venue	Opponent	Score	Result
2011	Energia Areena, Vantaa, Finland	(Denmark) Rasmus Fladberg	21–8, 17–21, 21–13	Gold

=== BWF World Tour (27 titles, 6 runners-up) ===
The BWF World Tour, which was announced on 19 March 2017 and implemented in 2018, is a series of elite badminton tournaments sanctioned by the Badminton World Federation (BWF). The BWF World Tour is divided into levels of World Tour Finals, Super 1000, Super 750, Super 500, Super 300, and the BWF Tour Super 100.

Men's singles
Year	Tournament	Level	Opponent	Score	Result
2018	Malaysia Masters	Super 500	(Japan) Kenta Nishimoto	21–13, 21–23, 21–18	(gold) Winner
2018	Indonesia Open	Super 1000	(Japan) Kento Momota	14–21, 9–21	(silver) Runner-up
2019	Spain Masters	Super 300	(Denmark) Anders Antonsen	21–14, 21–11	(gold) Winner
2019	All England Open	Super 1000	(Japan) Kento Momota	11–21, 21–15, 15–21	(silver) Runner-up
2019	India Open	Super 500	(India) Srikanth Kidambi	21–7, 22–20	(gold) Winner
2020	Malaysia Masters	Super 500	(Japan) Kento Momota	22–24, 11–21	(silver) Runner-up
2020	Spain Masters	Super 300	(Thailand) Kunlavut Vitidsarn	21–16, 21–13	(gold) Winner
2020	All England Open	Super 1000	(Chinese Taipei) Chou Tien-chen	21–13, 21–14	(gold) Winner
2020 (I)	Thailand Open	Super 1000	(Hong Kong) Ng Ka Long	21–14, 21–14	(gold) Winner
2020 (II)	Thailand Open	Super 1000	(Denmark) Hans-Kristian Vittinghus	21–11, 21–7	(gold) Winner
2020	BWF World Tour Finals	World Tour Finals	(Denmark) Anders Antonsen	16–21, 21–5, 17–21	(silver) Runner-up
2021	Swiss Open	Super 300	(Thailand) Kunlavut Vitidsarn	21–16, 21–6	(gold) Winner
2021	All England Open	Super 1000	(Malaysia) Lee Zii Jia	29–30, 22–20, 9–21	(silver) Runner-up
2021	Denmark Open	Super 1000	(Japan) Kento Momota	20–22, 21–18, 21–12	(gold) Winner
2021	Indonesia Open	Super 1000	(Singapore) Loh Kean Yew	21–13, 9–21, 21–13	(gold) Winner
2021	BWF World Tour Finals	World Tour Finals	(Thailand) Kunlavut Vitidsarn	21–12, 21–8	(gold) Winner
2022	All England Open	Super 1000	(India) Lakshya Sen	21–10, 21–15	(gold) Winner
2022	Indonesia Masters	Super 500	(Chinese Taipei) Chou Tien-chen	21–10, 21–12	(gold) Winner
2022	Indonesia Open	Super 1000	(China) Zhao Junpeng	21–9, 21–10	(gold) Winner
2022	Malaysia Open	Super 750	(Japan) Kento Momota	21–4, 21–7	(gold) Winner
2022	French Open	Super 750	(Denmark) Rasmus Gemke	21–14, 21–15	(gold) Winner
2022	BWF World Tour Finals	World Tour Finals	(Indonesia) Anthony Sinisuka Ginting	21–13, 21–14	(gold) Winner
2023	Malaysia Open	Super 1000	(Japan) Kodai Naraoka	21–6, 21–15	(gold) Winner
2023	India Open	Super 750	(Thailand) Kunlavut Vitidsarn	20–22, 21–10, 12–21	(silver) Runner-up
2023	Indonesia Open	Super 1000	(Indonesia) Anthony Sinisuka Ginting	21–14, 21–13	(gold) Winner
2023	Japan Open	Super 750	(Indonesia) Jonatan Christie	21–7, 21–18	(gold) Winner
2023	China Open	Super 1000	(China) Lu Guangzu	21–16, 21–19	(gold) Winner
2023	Japan Masters	Super 500	(China) Shi Yuqi	22–20, 21–17	(gold) Winner
2023	BWF World Tour Finals	World Tour Finals	(China) Shi Yuqi	21–11, 21–12	(gold) Winner
2024	Malaysia Masters	Super 500	(Malaysia) Lee Zii Jia	21–6, 20–22, 21–13	(gold) Winner
2024	Hong Kong Open	Super 500	(China) Lei Lanxi	21–9, 21–12	(gold) Winner
2025	India Open	Super 750	(Hong Kong) Lee Cheuk Yiu	21–16, 21–8	(gold) Winner
2025	German Open	Super 300	(Singapore) Loh Kean Yew	21–19, 21–18	(gold) Winner

=== BWF Superseries (4 titles, 7 runners-up) ===
The BWF Superseries, which was launched on 14 December 2006 and implemented in 2007, was a series of elite badminton tournaments, sanctioned by the Badminton World Federation (BWF). BWF Superseries levels were Superseries and Superseries Premier. A season of Superseries consisted of twelve tournaments around the world that had been introduced since 2011. Successful players were invited to the Superseries Finals, which were held at the end of each year.

Men's singles
Year	Tournament	Opponent	Score	Result
2012	French Open	(Malaysia) Liew Daren	18–21, 17–21	(silver) Runner-up
2015	India Open	(India) Srikanth Kidambi	21–18, 13–21, 12–21	(silver) Runner-up
2015	Australian Open	(China) Chen Long	12–21, 21–14, 18–21	(silver) Runner-up
2015	Japan Open	(China) Lin Dan	19–21, 21–16, 19–21	(silver) Runner-up
2015	Dubai World Superseries Finals	(Japan) Kento Momota	15–21, 12–21	(silver) Runner-up
2016	India Open	(Japan) Kento Momota	15–21, 18–21	(silver) Runner-up
2016	Dubai World Superseries Finals	(China) Tian Houwei	21–14, 6–21, 21–17	(gold) Winner
2017	India Open	(Chinese Taipei) Chou Tien-chen	21–13, 21–10	(gold) Winner
2017	Japan Open	(Malaysia) Lee Chong Wei	21–14, 19–21, 21–14	(gold) Winner
2017	China Open	(China) Chen Long	16–21, 21–14, 13–21	(silver) Runner-up
2017	Dubai World Superseries Finals	(Malaysia) Lee Chong Wei	19–21, 21–19, 21–15	(gold) Winner

BWF Super Series Finals tournament
BWF Super Series Premier tournament
BWF Super Series tournament

=== BWF Grand Prix (1 title, 1 runner-up) ===
The BWF Grand Prix had two levels, the Grand Prix and Grand Prix Gold. It was a series of badminton tournaments sanctioned by the Badminton World Federation (BWF) and played between 2007 and 2017.

Men's singles
Year	Tournament	Opponent	Score	Result
2014	Swiss Open	(China) Tian Houwei	21–7, 16–21, 25–23	(gold) Winner
2015	Swiss Open	(India) Srikanth Kidambi	15-21, 21-12, 14-21	(silver) Runner-up

BWF Grand Prix Gold tournament
BWF Grand Prix tournament

=== BWF International Challenge/Series (4 titles, 2 runners-up) ===
Men's singles
Year	Tournament	Opponent	Score	Result
2010	Swedish International Stockholm	(Indonesia) Indra Bagus Ade Chandra	15–21, 12–21	(silver) Runner-up
2010	Cyprus International	(France) Simon Maunoury	21–10, 21–11	(gold) Winner
2011	Swedish International Stockholm	(Spain) Pablo Abián	19–21, 6–21	(silver) Runner-up
2011	Spanish Open	(Spain) Pablo Abián	21–11, 7–21, 21–9	(gold) Winner
2013	Dutch International	(Netherlands) Eric Pang	24–22, 21–12	(gold) Winner
2013	Denmark International	(Finland) Ville Lång	21–17, 21–8	(gold) Winner

BWF International Challenge tournament
BWF International Series tournament

== Performance timeline ==
Key

W	Won	F	Finalist	SF	Semi-finalist
QF	Quarter-finalist	#R	Rounds 4, 3, 2, 1	RR	Round-robin stage
Q#	Qualification round	A	Absent	w/d	Withdrew
G	Gold	S	Silver	B	Bronze
NH	Not held	N/A	Not applicable	DNQ	Did not qualify

=== National team ===
- Junior level

Team events	2010	2011
European Junior Championships	NH	B
World Junior Championships	6th	A

- Senior level

Team events	2012	2013	2014	2015	2016	2017	2018	2019	2020	2021	2022	2023	2024	2025
European Men's Team Championships	G	NH	G	NH	G	NH	G	NH	G	NH			G	NH
European Mixed Team Championships	NH	S	NH	G	NH	G	NH	G	NH	G	NH	G	NH	G
Thomas Cup	B	NH	QF	NH	G	NH	B	NH	B	NH	B	NH	QF	NH
Sudirman Cup	NH	B	NH	QF	NH	QF	NH	QF	NH	QF	NH	QF	NH	A

=== Individual competitions ===
- Junior level

Events	2010	2011	2012
European Junior Championships	NH	G	NH
World Junior Championships	G	S	QF

- Senior level

Events	2012	2013	2014	2015	2016	2017	2018	2019	2020	2021	2022	2023	2024	2025
European Championships	B	NH	B	NH	G	B	G	NH		S	G	NH	B	w/d
European Games	NH			A	NH			w/d	NH			G	NH	
World Championships	NH	2R	B	QF	NH	G	QF	A	NH	1R	G	QF	NH	w/d
Olympic Games	DNQ	NH			B	NH			G	NH			G	NH

Tournament	BWF Superseries / Grand Prix									BWF World Tour								Best
Tournament	2009	2010	2011	2012	2013	2014	2015	2016	2017	2018	2019	2020	2021	2022	2023	2024	2025	Best
Malaysia Open	A			1R	1R	1R	1R	QF	2R	QF	QF	NH		W	W	SF	1R	W ('22, '23)
India Open	A					QF	F	F	W	w/d	W	NH		A	F	w/d	W	W ('17, '19, '25)
Indonesia Masters	A								NH	2R	SF	SF	2R	W	w/d	A		W ('22)
German Open	A			2R	2R	QF	A	1R	A			NH		SF	A		W	W ('25)
All England Open	A			1R	1R	1R	QF	QF	QF	w/d	F	W	F	W	2R	QF	1R	W ('20, '22)
Swiss Open	A		2R	QF	2R	W	F	A			w/d	NH	W	2R	SF	A		W ('14, '21)
Spain Masters	NH									A	W	W	A	NH	A		NH	W ('19, '20)
Chinese Taipei Open	A				QF	A						NH		A				QF ('13)
Thailand Open	A	NH	1R	A		NH	A					W	NH	2R	A			W ('20 I, '20 II)
Thailand Open	A	NH	1R	A		NH	A					W	NH	2R	A			W ('20 I, '20 II)
Malaysia Masters	A									W	SF	F	NH	w/d	w/d	W	A	W ('18, '24)
Singapore Open	A		QF	SF	A	1R	2R	2R	1R	A	SF	NH		w/d	w/d	SF	A	SF ('12, '19, '24)
Indonesia Open	A			1R	1R	2R	1R	1R	1R	F	w/d	NH	W	W	W	w/d	A	W ('21, '22, '23)
Canada Open	NH	A										NH		A	w/d	A		—
Japan Open	A		1R	2R	A	1R	F	QF	W	SF	w/d	NH		w/d	W	w/d	A	W ('17, '23)
China Open	A		Q1	A	1R	2R	QF	SF	F	2R	1R	NH			W	1R	A	W ('23)
Hong Kong Open	A		2R	2R	2R	QF	1R	A	w/d	A	QF	NH			1R	W	1R	W ('24)
China Masters	A			1R	1R	A				w/d	QF	NH			w/d	SF	2R	SF ('24)
Korea Open	A				2R	1R	1R	w/d	w/d	2R	2R	NH		A				2R ('13, '18, '19)
Arctic Open	N/A		NH	N/A								NH			w/d	A		—
Denmark Open	Q1 (MD)	2R	QF	1R	2R	1R	SF	2R	QF	2R	SF	A	W	QF	2R	2R	SF	W ('21)
French Open	A	1R	A	F	1R	QF	2R	2R	w/d	w/d	SF	NH	1R	W	1R	2R	QF	W ('22)
Hylo Open	A	1R	A			w/d	A											1R ('10)
Japan Masters	NH														W	SF	A	W ('23)
Australian Open	A					1R	F	w/d	w/d	A		NH		A				F ('15)
Syed Modi International	A					NH	A	SF	A				NH		A			SF ('15)
BWF Superseries / World Tour Finals	DNQ						F	W	W	DNQ	RR	F	W	W	W	w/d	DNQ	W ('16, '17, '21, '22, '23)
Dutch Open	A	QF	A									NH	NA					QF ('10)
London Grand Prix Gold	NH				SF	NH												SF ('13)
Year-end ranking		66	35	27	23	12	6	3	1	6	5	4	1	1	1	4	30	1
Tournament	2009	2010	2011	2012	2013	2014	2015	2016	2017	2018	2019	2020	2021	2022	2023	2024	2025	Best

== Career overview ==
Singles	Played	Wins	Losses	Balance
Total	715	560	155	+405
Current year (2025)	12	10	2	+8

Doubles	Played	Wins	Losses	Balance
Total	1	0	1	–1
Current year (2025)	0	0	0	0

== Record against selected opponents ==
Record against Year-end Finals finalists, World Championships semi-finalists, and Olympic quarter-finalists. Accurate as of 22 December 2025.

Player	Matches	Win	Lost	Diff.
(China) Bao Chunlai	1	1	0	+1
(China) Chen Long	20	6	14	–8
(China) Du Pengyu	2	0	2	–2
(China) Lin Dan	9	6	3	+3
(China) Shi Yuqi	13	9	4	+5
(China) Tian Houwei	2	2	0	+2
(China) Zhao Junpeng	6	5	1	+4
(Chinese Taipei) Chou Tien-chen	26	22	4	+18
(Denmark) Anders Antonsen	11	6	5	+1
(Denmark) Peter Gade	1	0	1	–1
(Denmark) Jan Ø. Jørgensen	8	5	3	+2
(Denmark) Hans-Kristian Vittinghus	6	4	2	+2
(England) Rajiv Ouseph	7	6	1	+5
(France) Christo Popov	7	7	0	+7
(Guatemala) Kevin Cordón	1	1	0	+1
(India) Parupalli Kashyap	4	2	2	0
(India) Srikanth Kidambi	13	10	3	+7
(India) B. Sai Praneeth	6	6	0	+6
(India) Prannoy H. S.	10	7	3	+4
(India) Lakshya Sen	9	8	1	+7

Player	Matches	Win	Lost	Diff.
(Indonesia) Anthony Sinisuka Ginting	19	14	5	+9
(Indonesia) Taufik Hidayat	1	1	0	+1
(Indonesia) Sony Dwi Kuncoro	2	2	0	+2
(Indonesia) Tommy Sugiarto	7	5	2	+3
(Japan) Kento Momota	17	3	14	–11
(Japan) Kodai Naraoka	7	6	1	+5
(Japan) Sho Sasaki	5	3	2	+1
(Malaysia) Lee Chong Wei	14	3	11	–8
(Malaysia) Lee Zii Jia	10	7	3	+4
(Malaysia) Liew Daren	7	6	1	+5
(Malaysia) Wong Choong Hann	2	1	1	0
(Singapore) Loh Kean Yew	13	11	2	+9
(South Korea) Heo Kwang-hee	4	3	1	+2
(South Korea) Lee Hyun-il	4	1	3	–2
(South Korea) Son Wan-ho	12	7	5	+2
(Thailand) Boonsak Ponsana	3	2	1	+1
(Thailand) Kunlavut Vitidsarn	9	8	1	+7
(Thailand) Kantaphon Wangcharoen	2	2	0	+2
(Vietnam) Nguyễn Tiến Minh	1	1	0	+1

Awards and achievements
Preceded by Pernille Blume	Danish Sports Name of the Year; 2017	Succeeded by Caroline Wozniacki
