= Felix Burestedt =

Swedish badminton player (born 1995)

Personal information
- Born: Felix Jacob Burestedt; 26 February 1995 (age 31) Ängelholm, Sweden
- Height: 1.92 m (6 ft 4 in)
- Weight: 80 kg (176 lb)

Sport
- Country: Sweden
- Sport: Badminton
- Handedness: Right

Men's singles
- Highest ranking: 56 (21 January 2020)
- Current ranking: 72 (31 January 2023)
- BWF profile

Felix Jacob Burestedt (born 26 February 1995) is a Swedish badminton player. Trained at the Halmstad BMK, Burestedt made his international debut in 2013, and entered the Badminton Europe Centre of Excellence (CoE) in 2017. He won his first international title at the 2018 Lithuanian International in the men's singles event. He competed at the 2019 European Games, and also at the 2020 Summer Olympics.

== Achievements ==
=== BWF International Challenge/Series (2 titles, 3 runners-up) ===
Men's singles
Year	Tournament	Opponent	Score	Result
2018	Portuguese International	(Denmark) Rasmus Messerschmidt	18–21, 15–21	(silver) Runner-up
2018	Lithuanian International	(Poland) Michał Rogalski	21–12, 23–21	(gold) Winner
2019	Portuguese International	(Malaysia) Soo Teck Zhi	21–23, 21–8, 21–17	(gold) Winner
2019	Azerbaijan International	(Denmark) Rasmus Gemke	13–21, 12–21	(silver) Runner-up
2020	Swedish Open	(Denmark) Victor Svendsen	8–18 Retired	(silver) Runner-up

BWF International Challenge tournament
BWF International Series tournament
BWF Future Series tournament
