= Kai Schäfer =

German badminton player (born 1993)

Personal information
- Born: Kai Hendrik Schäfer; 13 June 1993 (age 33) Darmstadt, Germany
- Years active: 2009
- Height: 1.75 m (5 ft 9 in)

Sport
- Country: Germany
- Sport: Badminton
- Handedness: Right

Men's singles
- Highest ranking: 57 (27 December 2022)
- Current ranking: 64 (3 January 2023)
- BWF profile
Medal record
Men's badminton
Representing Germany
European Mixed Team Championships
Silver medal – second place	2019 Copenhagen	Mixed team
Bronze medal – third place	2017 Lubin	Mixed team
Bronze medal – third place	2021 Vantaa	Mixed team
Bronze medal – third place	2023 Aire-sur-la-Lys	Mixed team
European Men's Team Championships
Bronze medal – third place	2016 Kazan	Men's team
Bronze medal – third place	2018 Kazan	Men's team
Bronze medal – third place	2024 Łódź	Men's team
European Junior Championships
Gold medal – first place	2011 Vantaa	Mixed team

Kai Hendrik Schäfer (born 13 June 1993) is a German badminton player. He competed at the 2020 Tokyo Olympics.

== Achievements ==
=== BWF International Challenge/Series (4 titles, 2 runners-up) ===
Men's singles
Year	Tournament	Opponent	Score	Result
2017	Latvia International	(Finland) Kasper Lehikoinen	21–11, 21–14	(gold) Winner
2017	Lithuanian International	(France) Léo Rossi	21–17, 21–14	(gold) Winner
2018	Polish International	(India) Harsheel Dani	21–14, 20–22, 21–9	(gold) Winner
2019	Denmark International	(Denmark) Hans-Kristian Vittinghus	16–21, 18–21	(silver) Runner-up
2022	Bahrain International	(Finland) Kalle Koljonen	21–14, 21–14	(gold) Winner

Men's doubles
Year	Tournament	Partner	Opponent	Score	Result
2014	Mauritius International	(Germany) Tobias Wadenka	(Germany) Raphael Beck (Germany) Andreas Heinz	21–18, 18–21, 20–22	(silver) Runner-up

BWF International Challenge tournament
BWF International Series tournament
BWF Future Series tournament
