= Kalle Koljonen =

Finnish badminton player (born 1994)

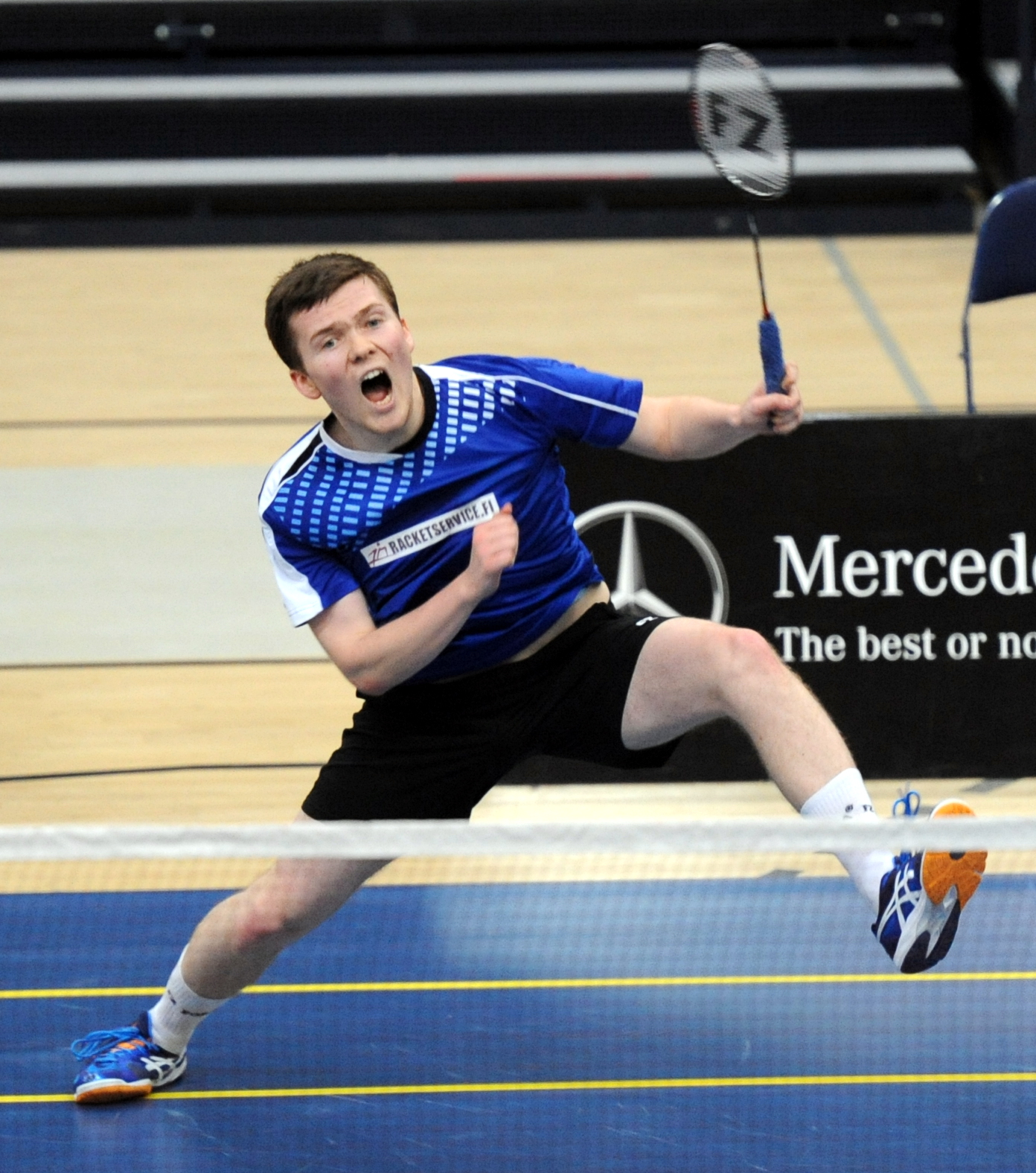

Personal information
- Born: 26 February 1994 (age 32) Helsinki, Finland
- Height: 1.75 m (5 ft 9 in)

Sport
- Country: Finland
- Sport: Badminton
- Handedness: Left

Men's singles
- Highest ranking: 47 (16 September 2025)
- Current ranking: 65 (25 August 2026)
- BWF profile
Medal record
Men's badminton
Representing Finland
European Championships
Bronze medal – third place	2021 Kyiv	Men's singles
European Men's Team Championships
Bronze medal – third place	2014 Basel	Men's team

Kalle Koljonen (born 26 February 1994) is a Finnish badminton player. In 2014, he won a bronze medal at the European Men's Team Championships in Basel. He won his first international title at the 2015 Hungarian International. Koljonen became first ever badminton player from his country to win a medal at the European Championships in 2021.

He competed for Finland at the 2024 Summer Olympics in the men's singles event.

== Achievements ==
=== European Championships ===
Men's singles
Year	Venue	Opponent	Score	Result
2021	Palace of Sports; Kyiv, Ukraine	(Denmark) Viktor Axelsen	14–21, 14–21	Bronze

=== BWF International Challenge/Series (3 titles, 8 runners-up) ===
Men's singles
Year	Tournament	Opponent	Score	Result
2015	Slovenian International	(Ukraine) Dmytro Zavadsky	21–12, 19–21, 20–22	(silver) Runner-up
2015	Hungarian International	(Denmark) Rasmus Messerschmidt	19–21, 21–17, 21–15	(gold) Winner
2016	Bulgarian International	(Denmark) Patrick Bjerregaard	14–21, 19–21	(silver) Runner-up
2016	Norwegian International	(Denmark) Kasper Dinesen	21–19, 21–13	(gold) Winner
2016	Finnish International	(Denmark) Victor Svendsen	7–11, 7–11, 11–8, 12–10, 4–11	(silver) Runner-up
2017	Iceland International	(India) Subhankar Dey	11–21, 17–21	(silver) Runner-up
2017	Dutch International	(India) Anand Pawar	22–20, 19–21, 17–21	(silver) Runner-up
2022	Bahrain International	(Germany) Kai Schäfer	14–21, 14–21	(silver) Runner-up
2023	Polish Open	(France) Alex Lanier	14–21, 15–21	(silver) Runner-up
2023	Swedish Open	(Denmark) Victor Svendsen	14–21, 11–21	(silver) Runner-up
2024	Turkey International	(India) Aryamann Tandon	21–16, 21–18	(gold) Winner

BWF International Challenge tournament
BWF International Series tournament
BWF Future Series tournament
