= Victor (sports company) =

Taiwanese sports equipment manufacturer

Victor Rackets Industrial Corp. 勝利體育事業股份有限公司

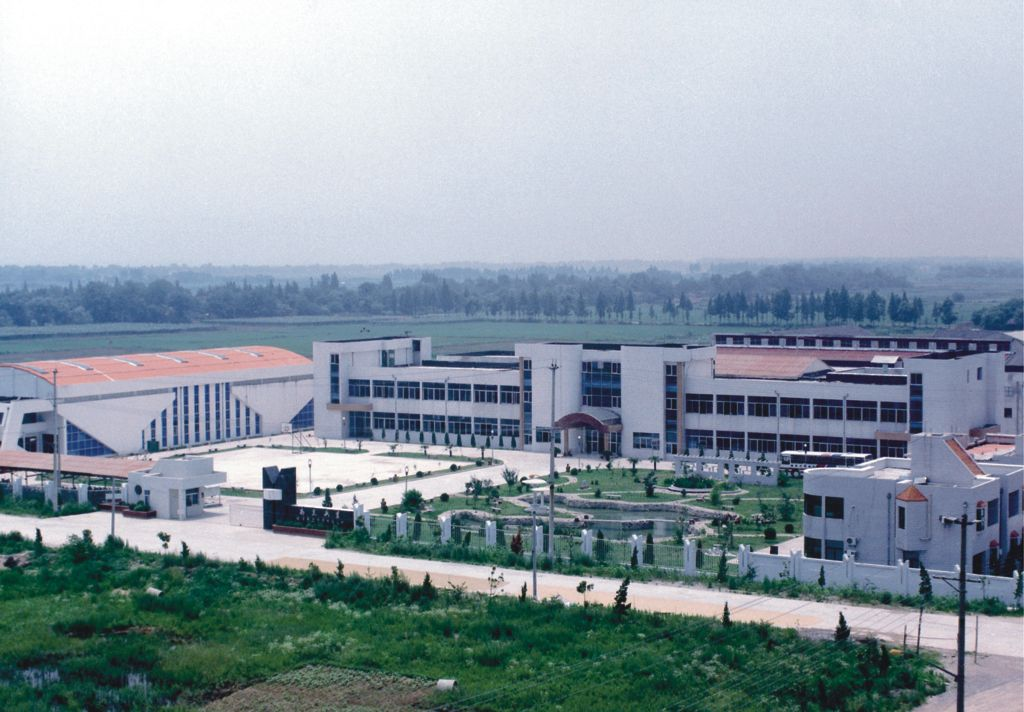
- Victor factory in Nanjing
- Type: Private
- Industry: Sportswear and Sports Equipment
- Founded: 1968; 58 years ago
- Headquarters: Taipei, Taiwan
- Key people: Chen Den-li (Founder and Chairman)
- Products: Badminton, shuttlecocks, shoes, apparel, equipment, accessories
- Number of employees: 71
- Subsidiaries: VICTOR Europe GmbH; VICTOR Rackets North America; Far East VICTOR Sports Sdn Bhd; VICTOR middle east Rayan Sports
- Website: www.victorsport.com

Victor Rackets Industrial Corporation (stylized as VICTOR) is a Taiwanese manufacturer of sporting equipment with products ranging from badminton and squash rackets, sportswear, shoes, shuttlecocks, and other equipment for the sport. Its products are among the ones approved by Badminton World Federation for international tournaments.

== History ==
Victor was founded in 1968 by Chen Den-li (陳登立), producing badminton shuttlecocks which in two years topped the sales in Taiwan. It expanded its distribution to Europe after Guido Schmidt started the distribution with VICTOR Sport Vertriebs GmbH as the trademark rights holder for the continent. In 1992, Victor opened its production center in Nanjing, Jiangsu.

Chen Den-li died on 4 January 2024, at the age of 89.

In December 2024, the company was caught in a controversy where the shirt sponsored to Malaysia national badminton player Lee Zii Jia was seen with an upside down flag during the 2024 BWF World Tour Finals. The company has since apologized for the unintended incident.

== Sponsorships ==
Victor supplies official materials for the following badminton athletes, teams, or associations:

=== National teams ===
- Denmark national badminton team

=== Associations ===
- Badminton Oceania

=== Brand ambassadors ===
- (China) Zhao Jianhua
- (China) Li Junhui
- (China) Liu Yuchen
- (China) Zheng Siwei
- (China) Huang Yaqiong
- (Indonesia) Liliyana Natsir
- (Malaysia) Goh Liu Ying
- (Malaysia) Lee Zii Jia
- (Denmark) Anders Antonsen

=== Players ===
==== Male players ====
- (Chinese Taipei) Wang Tzu-wei
- (Denmark) Anders Antonsen
- (England) Greg Mairs
- (India) Prannoy H. S.
- (Indonesia) Mohammad Ahsan
- (Indonesia) Praveen Jordan
- (Indonesia) Hendra Setiawan
- (Japan) Kodai Naraoka
- (Japan) Kenta Nishimoto
- (Malaysia) Goh Soon Huat
- (Malaysia) Goh Sze Fei
- (Malaysia) Nur Izzuddin
- (Malaysia) Lee Zii Jia
- (Malaysia) Tan Kian Meng

==== Female players ====
- (Chinese Taipei) Tai Tzu-ying
- (England) Jenny Mairs
- (India) Ashwini Ponnappa
- (Indonesia) Melati Daeva Oktavianti
- (Indonesia) Greysia Polii
- (Indonesia) Apriyani Rahayu
- (Indonesia) Siti Fadia Silva Ramadhanti
- (Indonesia) Putri Kusuma Wardani
- (Malaysia) Lai Pei Jing
- (Malaysia) Shevon Jemie Lai
