= 2024 BWF World Tour Finals =

2024 badminton tournament in Hangzhou, China

Tournament details
- Dates: 11–15 December
- Edition: 7th
- Level: World Tour Finals
- Total prize money: US$2,500,000
- Venue: Hangzhou Olympic Sports Centre Gymnasium
- Location: Xiacheng, Hangzhou, China

Champions
- Men's singles: (China) Shi Yuqi
- Women's singles: (China) Wang Zhiyi
- Men's doubles: (Denmark) Kim Astrup (Denmark) Anders Skaarup Rasmussen
- Women's doubles: (South Korea) Baek Ha-na (South Korea) Lee So-hee
- Mixed doubles: (China) Zheng Siwei (China) Huang Yaqiong

The 2024 BWF World Tour Finals (officially was the HSBC BWF World Tour Finals 2024 for sponsorship reasons) was the final tournament of the 2024 BWF World Tour. It has been held from 11 to 15 December 2024 in Hangzhou, China and features a total prize pool of $2,500,000.

== Tournament ==
The 2024 BWF World Tour was the seventh edition of the BWF World Tour Finals and was organized by the Chinese Badminton Association with sanction from the BWF.

=== Point distribution ===
Below is the point distribution table for each phase of the tournament based on the BWF points system for the BWF World Tour Finals event.

| Winner(s) | Runner(s)-up | Semi-finalists | 3rd in group | 4th in group |
|---|---|---|---|---|
| 14,000 | 12,000 | 10,000 | 8,900 | 7,800 |

=== Prize money ===
The total prize money for this year's tournament is US$2,500,000. Distribution of prize money was in accordance with BWF regulations.

| Achievement | Winner(s) | Runner(s)-up | Semi-finalist(s) | 3rd in group | 4th in group |
|---|---|---|---|---|---|
| Singles | $200,000 | $100,000 | $50,000 | $27,500 | $15,000 |
| Doubles | $210,000 | $100,000 | $50,000 | $32,500 | $17,500 |

== Representatives ==
=== Eligible players ===
Below are the eligible players for World Tour Finals. The top eight players, or pairs in doubles categories, in the BWF World Ranking are eligible to play in the tournament, with a maximum of two players or pairs representing each national member association.

==== Men's singles ====
| Seeds | Rank | NOCs | Players | Performances | | |
| Seeds | Rank | NOCs | Players | Winner | Runner-up | Semifinalists |
|---|---|---|---|---|---|---|
| 1 | 1 | Denmark (1) | Anders Antonsen | 4 Super 1000: Malaysia Open; Super 750: Denmark Open, China Masters; Super 500: Indonesia Masters | 1 Super 1000: Indonesia Open | |
| 2 | 2 | China (1) | Shi Yuqi | 4 Super 1000: Indonesia Open; Super 750: India Open, French Open, Singapore Open | 1 Super 1000: Malaysia Open | 2 Super 750: Japan Open, China Masters |
| 3/4 | 3 | Chinese Taipei (1) | Chou Tien-chen | 2 Super 500: Arctic Open; Super 300: Thailand Masters | 2 Super 750: Japan Open; Super 300: Swiss Open | 4 Super 750: Singapore Open; Super 500: Thailand Open; Super 300: Spain Masters, Taipei Open |
| 3/4 | 4 | Japan (1) | Kodai Naraoka | | 2 Super 1000: China Open; Super 500: Australian Open | 2 Super 750: India Open, Japan Open |
| | 5 | Thailand (1) | Kunlavut Vitidsarn | 1 Super 300: Korea Masters | 1 Super 750: French Open | 5 Super 1000: Indonesia Open, China Open; Super 500: Indonesia Masters, Thailand Masters, Arctic Open |
| | 6 | Malaysia (1) | Lee Zii Jia | 2 Super 500: Thailand Open, Australian Open | 1 Super 500: Malaysia Masters | |
| | 7 | Indonesia (1) | Jonatan Christie | 1 Super 1000: All England Open | 2 Super 750: China Masters; Super 500: Arctic Open | 3 Super 1000: China Open; Super 500: Hong Kong Open, Japan Masters |
| | 8 | China (2) | Li Shifeng | 1 Super 500: Japan Masters | 1 Super 750: Singapore Open | 1 Super 1000: Indonesia Open |

==== Women's singles ====
| Seeds | Rank | NOCs | Players | Performances | | |
| Seeds | Rank | NOCs | Players | Winner | Runner-up | Semifinalists |
|---|---|---|---|---|---|---|
| 1 | 1 | China (1) | Wang Zhiyi | 4 Super 1000: China Open; Super 750: Denmark Open; Super 500: Indonesia Masters, Malaysia Masters | 1 Super 500: Korea Open | 3 Super 1000: Indonesia Open; Super 750: India Open; Super 500: Thailand Masters |
| 2 | 2 | China (2) | Han Yue | 2 Super 500: Hong Kong Open, Arctic Open | 1 Super 500: Thailand Open | |
| 3/4 | 3 | Indonesia (1) | Gregoria Mariska Tunjung | | 2 Super 500: Japan Masters; Super 300: Swiss Open | 3 Super 750: Singapore Open, Denmark Open; Super 500: Arctic Open |
| 3/4 | 4 | South Korea (1) | An Se-young | 4 Super 1000: Malaysia Open; Super 750: French Open, Singapore Open, China Masters | 2 Super 1000: Indonesia Open; Super 750: Denmark Open | 1 Super 1000: All England Open |
| | 5 | Japan (1) | Aya Ohori | 2 Super 500: Australian Open; Super 300: Thailand Masters | | 2 Super 1000: China Open; Super 300: Syed Modi International |
| | 6 | Thailand (1) | Busanan Ongbamrungphan | 1 Super 500: Canada Open | 1 Super 750: Japan Open | 2 Super 500: Malaysia Masters; Super 300: Thailand Masters |
| | 7 | Thailand (2) | Supanida Katethong | 1 Super 500: Thailand Open | 2 Super 300: Thailand Masters, Spain Masters | 2 Super 750: Japan Open, China Masters |
| | 8 | Japan (2) | Akane Yamaguchi | 2 Super 750: Japan Open; Super 500: Japan Masters | 2 Super 1000: All England Open; Super 750: French Open | 1 Super 1000: China Open |

==== Men's doubles ====
| Seeds | Rank | NOCs | Players | Performances | | |
| Seeds | Rank | NOCs | Players | Winner | Runner-up | Semifinalists |
|---|---|---|---|---|---|---|
| 1 | 1 | Denmark (1) | Kim Astrup; Anders Skaarup Rasmussen | 2 Super 500: Malaysia Masters, Canada Open | 3 Super 750: Denmark Open; Indonesia Masters, Arctic Open | 2 Super 1000: Indonesia Open; Super 750: Singapore Open |
| 2 | 2 | China (1) | He Jiting; Ren Xiangyu | 3 Super 750: Singapore Open; Super 500: Australian Open; Super 300: Thailand Masters | 2 Super 1000: China Open; Super 300: German Open | 2 Super 750: China Masters; Super 500: Malaysia Masters |
| 3/4 | 3 | Indonesia (1) | Fajar Alfian; Muhammad Rian Ardianto | 2 Super 1000: All England Open; Super 500: Japan Masters | 1 Super 750: Singapore Open | 2 Super 750: Denmark Open; Super 500: Indonesia Masters |
| 3/4 | 4 | Malaysia (1) | Goh Sze Fei; Nur Izzuddin | 3 Super 1000: China Open; Super 750: Japan Open; Super 500: Arctic Open | | |
| | 5 | Chinese Taipei (1) | Lee Jhe-huei; Yang Po-hsuan | 2 Super 300: German Open, Taipei Open | 1 Super 750: French Open | 1 Super 1000: All England Open |
| | 6 | Indonesia (2) | Sabar Karyaman Gutama; Muhammad Reza Pahlevi Isfahani | 1 Super 300: Spain Masters | 4 Super 750: China Masters; Super 500: Hong Kong Open; Super 300: Orléans Masters, Macau Open | 2 Super 1000: Indonesia Open; Super 300: Swiss Open |
| | 7 | Malaysia (2) | Aaron Chia; Soh Wooi Yik | 1 Super 300: Korea Masters | 1 Super 1000: All England Open | 1 Super 750: India Open |
| | 39 | Chinese Taipei (2) | Lee Yang; Wang Chi-lin | | | |

==== Women's doubles ====
| Seeds | Rank | NOCs | Players | Performances | | |
| Seeds | Rank | NOCs | Players | Winner | Runner-up | Semifinalists |
|---|---|---|---|---|---|---|
| 1 | 1 | China (1) | Liu Shengshu; Tan Ning | 6 Super 1000: Malaysia Open; Super 750: Japan Open, China Masters; Super 500: Indonesia Masters, Arctic Open, Japan Masters | 2 Super 750: Denmark Open; Super 500: Hong Kong Open | 3 Super 1000: Indonesia Open; Super 750: French Open, Singapore Open |
| 2 | 2 | Japan (1) | Rin Iwanaga; Kie Nakanishi | 6 Super 750: Denmark Open; Super 500: Malaysia Masters, Canada Open; Super 300: Syed Modi International, Spain Masters, U.S. Open | | 4 Super 1000: Malaysia Open; Super 750: Japan Open; Super 500: Thailand Masters, Arctic Open |
| 3/4 | 4 | South Korea (1) | Baek Ha-na; Lee So-hee | 2 Super 1000: All England Open, Indonesia Open | 1 Super 750: Japan Open | 5 Super 1000: Malaysia Open; Super 750: India Open, Denmark Open; Super 500: Korea Open, Hong Kong Open |
| 3/4 | 5 | Malaysia (1) | Pearly Tan; Thinaah Muralitharan | 1 Super 500: Hong Kong Open | 2 Super 500: Korea Open, Arctic Open | 1 Super 500: Malaysia Masters |
| | 6 | Japan (2) | Nami Matsuyama; Chiharu Shida | | 3 Super 1000: All England Open; Super 750: French Open, Singapore Open | 3 Super 750: Denmark Open, China Masters; Super 500: Japan Masters |
| | 7 | Indonesia (1) | Febriana Dwipuji Kusuma; Amallia Cahaya Pratiwi | 2 Super 500: Australian Open; Super 300: Taipei Open | 2 Super 500: Thailand Open; Super 300: Spain Masters | 2 Super 300: Thailand Masters, Korea Masters |
| | 8 | India (1) | Treesa Jolly; Gayatri Gopichand | | | 2 Super 750: Singapore Open; Super 300: Macau Open |
| | 23 | China (2) | Chen Qingchen; Jia Yifan | 2 Super 750: French Open, Singapore Open | 1 Super 1000: Indonesia Open | |

==== Mixed doubles ====
| Seeds | Rank | NOCs | Players | Performances | | |
| Seeds | Rank | NOCs | Players | Winner | Runner-up | Semifinalists |
|---|---|---|---|---|---|---|
| 1 | 1 | China (1) | Jiang Zhenbang; Wei Yaxin | 4 Super 1000: Indonesia Open; Super 750: Japan Open; Super 500: Australian Open, Hong Kong Open | 3 Super 750: India Open, Denmark Open; Super 500: Arctic Open | 2 Super 1000: Malaysia Open; Super 750: French Open |
| 2 | 3 | Malaysia (1) | Goh Soon Huat; Shevon Jemie Lai | 2 Super 500: Malaysia Masters; Super 300: Swiss Open | 1 Super 1000: China Open | 2 Super 500: Arctic Open, Japan Masters |
| 3/4 | 4 | Malaysia (2) | Chen Tang Jie; Toh Ee Wei | 1 Super 500: Korea Open | 2 Super 300: Thailand Masters, Swiss Open | 2 Super 750: China Masters; Super 500: Hong Kong Open |
| 3/4 | 5 | Hong Kong (1) | Tang Chun Man; Tse Ying Suet | 1 Super 300: German Open | 1 Super 750: Japan Open | 4 Super 750: Denmark Open, China Masters; Super 500: Australian Open, Hong Kong Open |
| | 6 | Indonesia (1) | Dejan Ferdinansyah; Gloria Emanuelle Widjaja | 1 Super 300: Syed Modi International | 2 Super 300: Macau Open, Korea Masters | 1 Super 1000: China Open |
| | 8 | Chinese Taipei (1) | Yang Po-hsuan; Hu Ling-fang | | 2 Super 750: Singapore Open; Super 300: Taipei Open | 1 Super 750: Japan Open |
| | 13 | Japan (1) | Hiroki Midorikawa; Natsu Saito | | 1 Super 500: Indonesia Masters | 1 Super 300: Thailand Masters |
| | 19 | China (2) | Zheng Siwei; Huang Yaqiong | 3 Super 1000: All England Open; Super 750: Singapore Open; Super 500: Indonesia Masters | 1 Super 1000: Indonesia Open | |

== Representatives by nation ==
Top Nations
| Rank | Nation | MS | WS | MD | WD | XD | Total | Players |
|---|---|---|---|---|---|---|---|---|
| 1 | China (H) | 2 | 2 | 1 | 2 | 2 | 9 | 14 |
| 2 | Malaysia | 1 | | 2 | 1 | 2 | 6 | 11 |
| 2 | Indonesia | 1 | 1 | 2 | 1 | 1 | 6 | 10 |
| 2 | Japan | 1 | 2 | | 2 | 1 | 6 | 9 |
| 5 | Chinese Taipei | 1 | | 2 | | 1 | 4 | 7 |
| 6 | Thailand | 1 | 2 | | | | 3 | 3 |
| 7 | Denmark | 1 | | 1 | | | 2 | 3 |
| 7 | South Korea | | 1 | | 1 | | 2 | 3 |
| 9 | Hong Kong | | | | | 1 | 1 | 2 |
| 9 | India | | | | 1 | | 1 | 2 |
| Total | | 8 | 8 | 8 | 8 | 8 | 40 | 64 |

== Performances by nation ==
| Nation | Group stage | Semi-finals | Final | Winner(s) |
|---|---|---|---|---|
| China (H) | 9 | 7 | 4 | 3 |
| Denmark | 2 | 2 | 2 | 1 |
| South Korea | 2 | 2 | 1 | 1 |
| Malaysia | 6 | 3 | 2 | |
| Japan | 6 | 2 | 1 | |
| Indonesia | 6 | 3 | | |
| Chinese Taipei | 4 | 1 | | |
| Thailand | 3 | | | |
| Hong Kong | 1 | | | |
| India | 1 | | | |
| Total | 40 | 20 | 10 | 5 |

== Men's singles ==
=== Seeds ===
1. (Denmark) Anders Antonsen (final)
2. (China) Shi Yuqi (champion)
3. (Chinese Taipei) Chou Tien-chen (semi-finals)
4. (Japan) Kodai Naraoka (group stage)

=== Group A ===
| Rank | Players | Pld | W | L | GF | GA | GD | PF | PA | PD | Pts | Qualification |
|---|---|---|---|---|---|---|---|---|---|---|---|---|
| 1 | (Denmark) Anders Antonsen | 2 | 1 | 1 | 3 | 2 | +1 | 96 | 91 | +5 | 1 | Advance to semi-finals |
| 2 | (Chinese Taipei) Chou Tien-chen | 2 | 1 | 1 | 3 | 3 | 0 | 106 | 114 | –8 | 1 | Advance to semi-finals |
| 3 | (China) Li Shifeng | 2 | 1 | 1 | 2 | 3 | –1 | 90 | 93 | –3 | 1 | Eliminated |
| 4 | (Malaysia) Lee Zii Jia (Z) | – | – | – | – | – | – | – | – | – | – | Withdrew |

(Z) Withdrew after three matches.

| Date | Player 1 | Score | Player 2 | Set 1 | Set 2 | Set 3 |
|---|---|---|---|---|---|---|
| 11 Dec | ~~Chou Tien-chen~~ (Chinese Taipei) | ~~0–2~~ (voided) | ~~(Malaysia) Lee Zii Jia~~ | ~~13–21~~ | ~~15–21~~ | |
| 11 Dec | Anders Antonsen (Denmark) | 2–0 | (China) Li Shifeng | 21–14 | 21–19 | |
| 12 Dec | Chou Tien-chen (Chinese Taipei) | 1–2 | (China) Li Shifeng | 21–18 | 14–21 | 13–21 |
| 12 Dec | ~~Anders Antonsen (Denmark)~~ | ~~0–2~~ (voided) | ~~(Malaysia) Lee Zii Jia~~ | ~~14–21~~ | ~~19–21~~ | |
| 13 Dec | ~~Lee Zii Jia (Malaysia)~~ | ~~1–1~~ (voided) | ~~(China) Li Shifeng~~ | ~~22–20~~ | ~~15^{r}–11~~ | |
| 13 Dec | Anders Antonsen (Denmark) | 1–2 | (Chinese Taipei) Chou Tien-chen | 21–16 | 18–21 | 15–21 |

=== Group B ===
| Rank | Players | Pld | W | L | GF | GA | GD | PF | PA | PD | Pts | Qualification |
|---|---|---|---|---|---|---|---|---|---|---|---|---|
| 1 | (China) Shi Yuqi | 3 | 2 | 1 | 4 | 4 | 0 | 150 | 150 | 0 | 2 | Advance to semi-finals |
| 2 | (Indonesia) Jonatan Christie | 3 | 2 | 1 | 5 | 2 | +3 | 129 | 109 | +20 | 2 | Advance to semi-finals |
| 3 | (Thailand) Kunlavut Vitidsarn | 3 | 1 | 2 | 3 | 4 | –1 | 135 | 142 | –7 | 1 | Eliminated |
| 4 | (Japan) Kodai Naraoka | 3 | 1 | 2 | 2 | 4 | –2 | 105 | 118 | –13 | 1 | Eliminated |

| Date | Player 1 | Score | Player 2 | Set 1 | Set 2 | Set 3 |
|---|---|---|---|---|---|---|
| 11 Dec | Shi Yuqi (China) | 2–1 | (Indonesia) Jonatan Christie | 21–16 | 17–21 | 21–8 |
| 11 Dec | Kodai Naraoka (Japan) | 0–2 | (Thailand) Kunlavut Vitidsarn | 22–24 | 18–21 | |
| 12 Dec | Shi Yuqi (China) | 2–1 | (Thailand) Kunlavut Vitidsarn | 14–21 | 21–19 | 25–23 |
| 12 Dec | Kodai Naraoka (Japan) | 0–2 | (Indonesia) Jonatan Christie | 12–21 | 11–21 | |
| 13 Dec | Shi Yuqi (China) | 0–2 | (Japan) Kodai Naraoka | 14–21 | 17–21 | |
| 13 Dec | Kunlavut Vitidsarn (Thailand) | 0–2 | (Indonesia) Jonatan Christie | 15–21 | 12–21 | |

=== Finals ===
Semi-finals
A1 | (Denmark) Anders Antonsen | 21 | 15 | 21
B2 | (Indonesia) Jonatan Christie | 6 | 21 | 13
A2 | (Chinese Taipei) Chou Tien-chen | 14 | 18
B1 | (China) Shi Yuqi | 21 | 21

Final
A1 | (Denmark) Anders Antonsen | 18 | 14
B1 | (China) Shi Yuqi | 21 | 21

== Women's singles ==
=== Seeds ===
1. (China) Wang Zhiyi (champion)
2. (China) Han Yue (final)
3. (Indonesia) Gregoria Mariska Tunjung (group stage)
4. (South Korea) An Se-young (semi-finals)

=== Group A ===
| Rank | Players | Pld | W | L | GF | GA | GD | PF | PA | PD | Pts | Qualification |
|---|---|---|---|---|---|---|---|---|---|---|---|---|
| 1 | (Japan) Aya Ohori | 3 | 3 | 0 | 6 | 1 | +5 | 139 | 118 | +21 | 3 | Advance to semi-finals |
| 2 | (China) Wang Zhiyi | 3 | 2 | 1 | 5 | 2 | +3 | 141 | 114 | +27 | 2 | Advance to semi-finals |
| 3 | (Indonesia) Gregoria Mariska Tunjung | 3 | 1 | 2 | 2 | 5 | –3 | 106 | 126 | –20 | 1 | Eliminated |
| 4 | (Thailand) Busanan Ongbamrungphan | 3 | 0 | 3 | 1 | 5 | –4 | 108 | 136 | –28 | 0 | Eliminated |

| Date | Player 1 | Score | Player 2 | Set 1 | Set 2 | Set 3 |
|---|---|---|---|---|---|---|
| 11 Dec | Gregoria Mariska Tunjung (Indonesia) | 0–2 | (Japan) Aya Ohori | 15–21 | 13–21 | |
| 11 Dec | Wang Zhiyi (China) | 2–0 | (Thailand) Busanan Ongbamrungphan | 21–19 | 21–14 | |
| 12 Dec | Wang Zhiyi (China) | 1–2 | (Japan) Aya Ohori | 17–21 | 21–13 | 19–21 |
| 12 Dec | Gregoria Mariska Tunjung (Indonesia) | 2–1 | (Thailand) Busanan Ongbamrungphan | 10–21 | 21–10 | 21–11 |
| 13 Dec | Aya Ohori (Japan) | 2–0 | (Thailand) Busanan Ongbamrungphan | 21–18 | 21–15 | |
| 13 Dec | Wang Zhiyi (China) | 2–0 | (Indonesia) Gregoria Mariska Tunjung | 21–8 | 21–16 | |

=== Group B ===
| Rank | Players | Pld | W | L | GF | GA | GD | PF | PA | PD | Pts | Qualification |
|---|---|---|---|---|---|---|---|---|---|---|---|---|
| 1 | (South Korea) An Se-young | 3 | 2 | 1 | 5 | 2 | +3 | 140 | 116 | +24 | 2 | Advance to semi-finals |
| 2 | (China) Han Yue | 3 | 2 | 1 | 4 | 2 | +2 | 110 | 112 | –2 | 2 | Advance to semi-finals |
| 3 | (Japan) Akane Yamaguchi | 3 | 2 | 1 | 4 | 4 | 0 | 155 | 156 | –1 | 2 | Eliminated |
| 4 | (Thailand) Supanida Katethong | 3 | 0 | 3 | 1 | 6 | –5 | 122 | 143 | –21 | 0 | Eliminated |

| Date | Player 1 | Score | Player 2 | Set 1 | Set 2 | Set 3 |
|---|---|---|---|---|---|---|
| 11 Dec | An Se-young (South Korea) | 2–0 | (Thailand) Supanida Katethong | 21–16 | 21–14 | |
| 11 Dec | Han Yue (China) | 2–0 | (Japan) Akane Yamaguchi | 21–19 | 21–17 | |
| 12 Dec | An Se-young (South Korea) | 1–2 | (Japan) Akane Yamaguchi | 20–22 | 21–17 | 15–21 |
| 12 Dec | Han Yue (China) | 2–0 | (Thailand) Supanida Katethong | 21–16 | 21–18 | |
| 13 Dec | Han Yue (China) | 0–2 | (South Korea) An Se-young | 11–21 | 15–21 | |
| 13 Dec | Supanida Katethong (Thailand) | 1–2 | (Japan) Akane Yamaguchi | 21–13 | 14–21 | 23–25 |

=== Finals ===
Semi-finals
A1 | (Japan) Aya Ohori | 17 | 13
B2 | (China) Han Yue | 21 | 21
A2 | (China) Wang Zhiyi | 21 | 21
B1 | (South Korea) An Se-young | 17 | 14

Final
B2 | (China) Han Yue | 21 | 19 | 11
A2 | (China) Wang Zhiyi | 19 | 21 | 21

== Men's doubles ==
=== Seeds ===
1. (Denmark) Kim Astrup / Anders Skaarup Rasmussen (champions)
2. (China) He Jiting / Ren Xiangyu (withdrew)
3. (Indonesia) Fajar Alfian / Muhammad Rian Ardianto (semi-finals)
4. (Malaysia) Goh Sze Fei / Nur Izzuddin (final)

=== Group A ===
| Rank | Players | Pld | W | L | GF | GA | GD | PF | PA | PD | Pts | Qualification |
|---|---|---|---|---|---|---|---|---|---|---|---|---|
| 1 | (Denmark) Kim Astrup (Denmark) Anders Skaarup Rasmussen | 3 | 2 | 1 | 4 | 4 | 0 | 142 | 154 | –12 | 2 | Advance to semi-finals |
| 2 | (Malaysia) Goh Sze Fei (Malaysia) Nur Izzuddin | 3 | 2 | 1 | 5 | 3 | +2 | 155 | 145 | +10 | 2 | Advance to semi-finals |
| 3 | (Chinese Taipei) Lee Yang (Chinese Taipei) Wang Chi-lin | 3 | 1 | 2 | 3 | 5 | –2 | 151 | 155 | –4 | 1 | Eliminated |
| 4 | (Chinese Taipei) Lee Jhe-huei (Chinese Taipei) Yang Po-hsuan | 3 | 1 | 2 | 4 | 4 | 0 | 150 | 144 | +6 | 1 | Eliminated |

| Date | Pair 1 | Score | Pair 2 | Set 1 | Set 2 | Set 3 |
|---|---|---|---|---|---|---|
| 11 Dec | Kim Astrup (Denmark); Anders Skaarup Rasmussen (Denmark) | 2–1 | (Malaysia) Goh Sze Fei (Malaysia) Nur Izzuddin | 21–18 | 16–21 | 21–14 |
| 11 Dec | Lee Jhe-huei (Chinese Taipei); Yang Po-hsuan (Chinese Taipei) | 1–2 | (Chinese Taipei) Lee Yang (Chinese Taipei) Wang Chi-lin | 21–16 | 16–21 | 18–21 |
| 12 Dec | Goh Sze Fei (Malaysia); Nur Izzuddin (Malaysia) | 2–1 | (Chinese Taipei) Lee Jhe-huei (Chinese Taipei) Yang Po-hsuan | 15–21 | 21–19 | 21–13 |
| 12 Dec | Kim Astrup (Denmark); Anders Skaarup Rasmussen (Denmark) | 2–1 | (Chinese Taipei) Lee Yang (Chinese Taipei) Wang Chi-lin | 13–21 | 21–19 | 21–19 |
| 13 Dec | Goh Sze Fei (Malaysia); Nur Izzuddin (Malaysia) | 2–0 | (Chinese Taipei) Lee Yang (Chinese Taipei) Wang Chi-lin | 24–22 | 21–12 | |
| 13 Dec | Kim Astrup (Denmark); Anders Skaarup Rasmussen (Denmark) | 0–2 | (Chinese Taipei) Lee Jhe-huei (Chinese Taipei) Yang Po-hsuan | 10–21 | 19–21 | |

=== Group B ===
| Rank | Players | Pld | W | L | GF | GA | GD | PF | PA | PD | Pts | Qualification |
|---|---|---|---|---|---|---|---|---|---|---|---|---|
| 1 | (Indonesia) Fajar Alfian (Indonesia) Muhammad Rian Ardianto | 2 | 1 | 1 | 3 | 2 | +1 | 99 | 105 | –6 | 1 | Advance to semi-finals |
| 2 | (Indonesia) Sabar Karyaman Gutama (Indonesia) Muhammad Reza Pahlevi Isfahani | 2 | 1 | 1 | 2 | 2 | 0 | 86 | 81 | +5 | 1 | Advance to semi-finals |
| 3 | (Malaysia) Aaron Chia (Malaysia) Soh Wooi Yik | 2 | 1 | 1 | 2 | 3 | –1 | 93 | 92 | +1 | 1 | Eliminated |
| 4 | (China) He Jiting (China) Ren Xiangyu (Z) | – | – | – | – | – | – | – | – | – | – | Withdrew |

(Z) Withdrew after two matches.

| Date | Pair 1 | Score | Pair 2 | Set 1 | Set 2 | Set 3 |
|---|---|---|---|---|---|---|
| 11 Dec | He Jiting (China); Ren Xiangyu (China) | ~~1–2~~ (voided) | (Malaysia) Aaron Chia (Malaysia) Soh Wooi Yik | ~~21–17~~ | ~~18–21~~ | ~~15–21~~ |
| 11 Dec | Fajar Alfian (Indonesia); Muhammad Rian Ardianto (Indonesia) | 2–0 | (Indonesia) Sabar Karyaman Gutama (Indonesia) Muhammad Reza Pahlevi Isfahani | 28–26 | 21–18 | |
| 12 Dec | He Jiting (China); Ren Xiangyu (China) | ~~0–2~~ (voided) | (Indonesia) Sabar Karyaman Gutama (Indonesia) Muhammad Reza Pahlevi Isfahani | ~~17–21~~ | ~~11–21~~ | |
| 12 Dec | Fajar Alfian (Indonesia); Muhammad Rian Ardianto (Indonesia) | 1–2 | (Malaysia) Aaron Chia (Malaysia) Soh Wooi Yik | 21–19 | 14–21 | 15–21 |
| 13 Dec | He Jiting (China); Ren Xiangyu (China) | N/P | (Indonesia) Fajar Alfian (Indonesia) Muhammad Rian Ardianto | Cancelled | | |
| 13 Dec | Sabar Karyaman Gutama (Indonesia); Muhammad Reza Pahlevi Isfahani (Indonesia) | 2–0 | (Malaysia) Aaron Chia (Malaysia) Soh Wooi Yik | 21–16 | 21–16 | |

=== Finals ===
Semi-finals
A1 | (Denmark) Kim Astrup (Denmark) Anders Skaarup Rasmussen | 23 | 21
B2 | (Indonesia) Sabar Karyaman Gutama (Indonesia) Muhammad Reza Pahlevi Isfahani | 21 | 13
A2 | (Malaysia) Goh Sze Fei (Malaysia) Nur Izzuddin | 17 | 21 | 27
B1 | (Indonesia) Fajar Alfian (Indonesia) Muhammad Rian Ardianto | 21 | 16 | 25

Final
A1 | (Denmark) Kim Astrup (Denmark) Anders Skaarup Rasmussen | 21 | 17 | 21
A2 | (Malaysia) Goh Sze Fei (Malaysia) Nur Izzuddin | 17 | 21 | 11

== Women's doubles ==
=== Seeds ===
1. (China) Liu Shengshu / Tan Ning (semi-finals)
2. (Japan) Rin Iwanaga / Kie Nakanishi (group stage)
3. (South Korea) Baek Ha-na / Lee So-hee (champions)
4. (Malaysia) Pearly Tan / Thinaah Muralitharan (group stage)

=== Group A ===
| Rank | Players | Pld | W | L | GF | GA | GD | PF | PA | PD | Pts | Qualification |
|---|---|---|---|---|---|---|---|---|---|---|---|---|
| 1 | (China) Liu Shengshu (China) Tan Ning | 3 | 3 | 0 | 6 | 2 | +4 | 165 | 125 | +40 | 3 | Advance to semi-finals |
| 2 | (Japan) Nami Matsuyama (Japan) Chiharu Shida | 3 | 2 | 1 | 4 | 3 | +1 | 118 | 128 | –10 | 2 | Advance to semi-finals |
| 3 | (India) Treesa Jolly (India) Gayatri Gopichand | 3 | 1 | 2 | 3 | 4 | –1 | 128 | 143 | –15 | 1 | Eliminated |
| 4 | (Malaysia) Pearly Tan (Malaysia) Thinaah Muralitharan | 3 | 0 | 3 | 2 | 6 | –4 | 142 | 157 | –15 | 0 | Eliminated |

| Date | Pair 1 | Score | Pair 2 | Set 1 | Set 2 | Set 3 |
|---|---|---|---|---|---|---|
| 11 Dec | Liu Shengshu (China); Tan Ning (China) | 2–1 | (India) Treesa Jolly (India) Gayatri Gopichand | 20–22 | 22–20 | 21–14 |
| 11 Dec | Pearly Tan (Malaysia); Thinaah Muralitharan (Malaysia) | 1–2 | (Japan) Nami Matsuyama (Japan) Chiharu Shida | 21–13 | 17–21 | 18–21 |
| 12 Dec | Liu Shengshu (China); Tan Ning (China) | 2–0 | (Japan) Nami Matsuyama (Japan) Chiharu Shida | 21–7 | 21–14 | |
| 12 Dec | Pearly Tan (Malaysia); Thinaah Muralitharan (Malaysia) | 0–2 | (India) Treesa Jolly (India) Gayatri Gopichand | 19–21 | 19–21 | |
| 13 Dec | Liu Shengshu (China); Tan Ning (China) | 2–1 | (Malaysia) Pearly Tan (Malaysia) Thinaah Muralitharan | 21–9 | 18–21 | 21–18 |
| 13 Dec | Nami Matsuyama (Japan); Chiharu Shida (Japan) | 2–0 | (India) Treesa Jolly (India) Gayatri Gopichand | 21–17 | 21–13 | |

=== Group B ===
| Rank | Players | Pld | W | L | GF | GA | GD | PF | PA | PD | Pts | Qualification |
|---|---|---|---|---|---|---|---|---|---|---|---|---|
| 1 | (China) Chen Qingchen (China) Jia Yifan | 3 | 3 | 0 | 6 | 0 | +6 | 126 | 93 | +33 | 3 | Advance to semi-finals |
| 2 | (South Korea) Baek Ha-na (South Korea) Lee So-hee | 3 | 2 | 1 | 4 | 2 | +2 | 116 | 86 | +30 | 2 | Advance to semi-finals |
| 3 | (Indonesia) Febriana Dwipuji Kusuma (Indonesia) Amallia Cahaya Pratiwi | 3 | 1 | 2 | 2 | 4 | –2 | 98 | 111 | –13 | 1 | Eliminated |
| 4 | (Japan) Rin Iwanaga (Japan) Kie Nakanishi | 3 | 0 | 3 | 0 | 6 | –6 | 76 | 126 | –50 | 0 | Eliminated |

| Date | Pair 1 | Score | Pair 2 | Set 1 | Set 2 | Set 3 |
|---|---|---|---|---|---|---|
| 11 Dec | Baek Ha-na (South Korea); Lee So-hee (South Korea) | 2–0 | (Indonesia) Febriana Dwipuji Kusuma (Indonesia) Amallia Cahaya Pratiwi | 21–6 | 21–17 | |
| 11 Dec | Rin Iwanaga (Japan); Kie Nakanishi (Japan) | 0–2 | (China) Chen Qingchen (China) Jia Yifan | 11–21 | 17–21 | |
| 12 Dec | Baek Ha-na (South Korea); Lee So-hee (South Korea) | 0–2 | (China) Chen Qingchen (China) Jia Yifan | 16–21 | 16–21 | |
| 12 Dec | Rin Iwanaga (Japan); Kie Nakanishi (Japan) | 0–2 | (Indonesia) Febriana Dwipuji Kusuma (Indonesia) Amallia Cahaya Pratiwi | 15–21 | 12–21 | |
| 13 Dec | Febriana Dwipuji Kusuma (Indonesia); Amallia Cahaya Pratiwi (Indonesia) | 0–2 | (China) Chen Qingchen (China) Jia Yifan | 14–21 | 19–21 | |
| 13 Dec | Rin Iwanaga (Japan); Kie Nakanishi (Japan) | 0–2 | (South Korea) Baek Ha-na (South Korea) Lee So-hee | 15–21 | 6–21 | |

=== Finals ===
Semi-finals
A1 | (China) Liu Shengshu (China) Tan Ning | 14 | 20
B2 | (South Korea) Baek Ha-na (South Korea) Lee So-hee | 21 | 22
A2 | (Japan) Nami Matsuyama (Japan) Chiharu Shida | 23 | 21
B1 | (China) Chen Qingchen (China) Jia Yifan | 21 | 13

Final
B2 | (South Korea) Baek Ha-na (South Korea) Lee So-hee | 21 | 21
A2 | (Japan) Nami Matsuyama (Japan) Chiharu Shida | 19 | 14

== Mixed doubles ==
=== Seeds ===
1. (China) Jiang Zhenbang / Wei Yaxin (semi-finals)
2. (Malaysia) Goh Soon Huat / Shevon Jemie Lai (semi-finals)
3. (Malaysia) Chen Tang Jie / Toh Ee Wei (final)
4. (Hong Kong) Tang Chun Man / Tse Ying Suet (group stage)

=== Group A ===
| Rank | Players | Pld | W | L | GF | GA | GD | PF | PA | PD | Pts | Qualification |
|---|---|---|---|---|---|---|---|---|---|---|---|---|
| 1 | (China) Jiang Zhenbang (China) Wei Yaxin | 3 | 3 | 0 | 6 | 1 | +5 | 146 | 125 | +21 | 3 | Advance to semi-finals |
| 2 | (China) Zheng Siwei (China) Huang Yaqiong | 3 | 2 | 1 | 4 | 3 | +1 | 135 | 131 | +4 | 2 | Advance to semi-finals |
| 3 | (Hong Kong) Tang Chun Man (Hong Kong) Tse Ying Suet | 3 | 1 | 2 | 4 | 4 | 0 | 146 | 149 | –3 | 1 | Eliminated |
| 4 | (Chinese Taipei) Yang Po-hsuan (Chinese Taipei) Hu Ling-fang | 3 | 0 | 3 | 0 | 6 | –6 | 104 | 126 | –22 | 0 | Eliminated |

| Date | Pair 1 | Score | Pair 2 | Set 1 | Set 2 | Set 3 |
|---|---|---|---|---|---|---|
| 11 Dec | Tang Chun Man (Hong Kong); Tse Ying Suet (Hong Kong) | 2–0 | (Chinese Taipei) Yang Po-hsuan (Chinese Taipei) Hu Ling-fang | 21–15 | 21–17 | |
| 11 Dec | Jiang Zhenbang (China); Wei Yaxin (China) | 2–0 | (China) Zheng Siwei (China) Huang Yaqiong | 21–17 | 22–20 | |
| 12 Dec | Jiang Zhenbang (China); Wei Yaxin (China) | 2–0 | (Chinese Taipei) Yang Po-hsuan (Chinese Taipei) Hu Ling-fang | 21–17 | 21–19 | |
| 12 Dec | Tang Chun Man (Hong Kong); Tse Ying Suet (Hong Kong) | 1–2 | (China) Zheng Siwei (China) Huang Yaqiong | 21–14 | 13–21 | 18–21 |
| 13 Dec | Yang Po-hsuan (Chinese Taipei); Hu Ling-fang (Chinese Taipei) | 0–2 | (China) Zheng Siwei (China) Huang Yaqiong | 19–21 | 17–21 | |
| 13 Dec | Jiang Zhenbang (China); Wei Yaxin (China) | 2–1 | (Hong Kong) Tang Chun Man (Hong Kong) Tse Ying Suet | 21–16 | 19–21 | 21–15 |

=== Group B ===
| Rank | Players | Pld | W | L | GF | GA | GD | PF | PA | PD | Pts | Qualification |
|---|---|---|---|---|---|---|---|---|---|---|---|---|
| 1 | (Malaysia) Chen Tang Jie (Malaysia) Toh Ee Wei | 3 | 3 | 0 | 6 | 1 | +5 | 140 | 115 | +25 | 3 | Advance to semi-finals |
| 2 | (Malaysia) Goh Soon Huat (Malaysia) Shevon Jemie Lai | 3 | 2 | 1 | 5 | 3 | +2 | 146 | 134 | +12 | 2 | Advance to semi-finals |
| 3 | (Indonesia) Dejan Ferdinansyah (Indonesia) Gloria Emanuelle Widjaja | 3 | 1 | 2 | 3 | 5 | –2 | 145 | 154 | –9 | 1 | Eliminated |
| 4 | (Japan) Hiroki Midorikawa (Japan) Natsu Saito | 3 | 0 | 3 | 1 | 6 | –5 | 116 | 144 | –28 | 0 | Eliminated |

| Date | Pair 1 | Score | Pair 2 | Set 1 | Set 2 | Set 3 |
|---|---|---|---|---|---|---|
| 11 Dec | Dejan Ferdinansyah (Indonesia); Gloria Emanuelle Widjaja (Indonesia) | 2–1 | (Japan) Hiroki Midorikawa (Japan) Natsu Saito | 23–21 | 16–21 | 21–11 |
| 11 Dec | Goh Soon Huat (Malaysia); Shevon Jemie Lai (Malaysia) | 1–2 | (Malaysia) Chen Tang Jie (Malaysia) Toh Ee Wei | 21–14 | 10–21 | 14–21 |
| 12 Dec | Chen Tang Jie (Malaysia); Toh Ee Wei (Malaysia) | 2–0 | (Indonesia) Dejan Ferdinansyah (Indonesia) Gloria Emanuelle Widjaja | 21–17 | 21–18 | |
| 12 Dec | Goh Soon Huat (Malaysia); Shevon Jemie Lai (Malaysia) | 2–0 | (Japan) Hiroki Midorikawa (Japan) Natsu Saito | 21–14 | 21–14 | |
| 13 Dec | Goh Soon Huat (Malaysia); Shevon Jemie Lai (Malaysia) | 2–1 | (Indonesia) Dejan Ferdinansyah (Indonesia) Gloria Emanuelle Widjaja | 17–21 | 21–15 | 21–14 |
| 13 Dec | Chen Tang Jie (Malaysia); Toh Ee Wei (Malaysia) | 2–0 | (Japan) Hiroki Midorikawa (Japan) Natsu Saito | 21–17 | 21–18 | |

=== Finals ===
Semi-finals
A1 | (China) Jiang Zhenbang (China) Wei Yaxin | 11 | 18
A2 | (China) Zheng Siwei (China) Huang Yaqiong | 21 | 21
B2 | (Malaysia) Goh Soon Huat (Malaysia) Shevon Jemie Lai | 15 | 12
B1 | (Malaysia) Chen Tang Jie (Malaysia) Toh Ee Wei | 21 | 21

Final
A2 | (China) Zheng Siwei (China) Huang Yaqiong | 21 | 14 | 21
B1 | (Malaysia) Chen Tang Jie (Malaysia) Toh Ee Wei | 18 | 21 | 17

| Preceded by 2024 Guwahati Masters | BWF World Tour; 2024 BWF season | Succeeded by 2025 Malaysia Open |
