= Anders Antonsen =

Danish badminton player (born 1997)

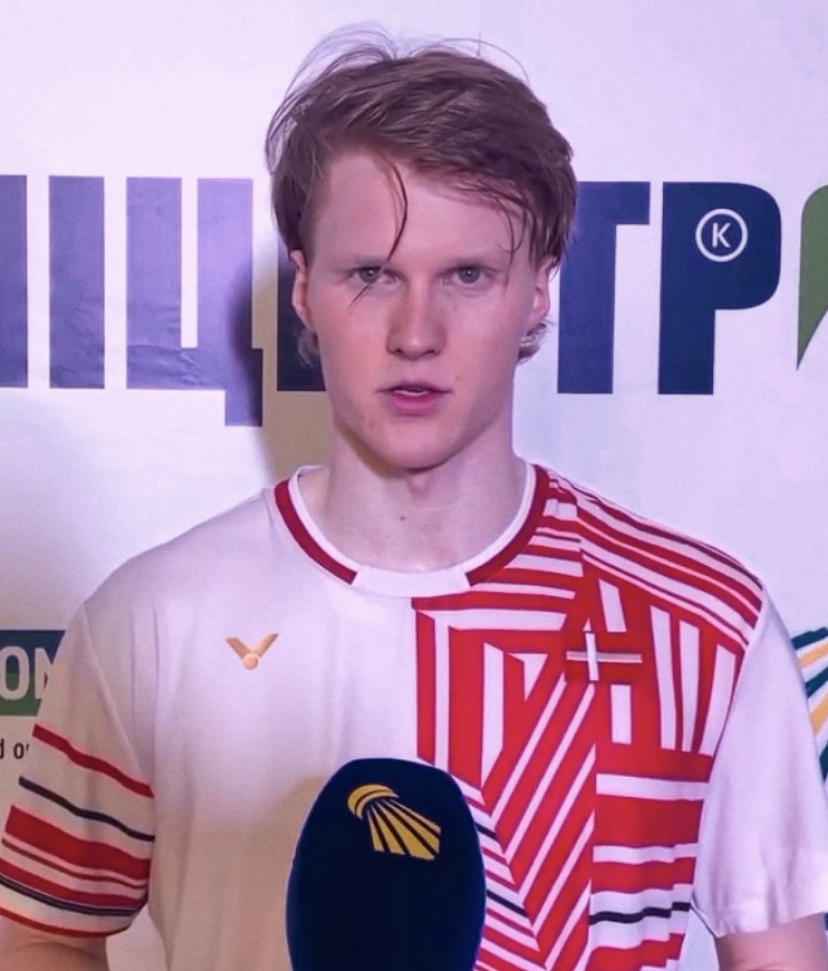

Personal information
- Born: 27 April 1997 (age 29) Aarhus, Denmark
- Years active: 2013–present
- Height: 1.85 m (6 ft 1 in)
- Weight: 80 kg (176 lb)

Sport
- Country: Denmark
- Sport: Badminton
- Handedness: Right
- Coached by: Kasper Antonsen

Men's singles
- Career record: 354 wins, 122 losses
- Highest ranking: 2 (27 September 2022)
- Current ranking: 3 (27 October 2026)
- BWF profile
Medal record
Men's badminton
Representing Denmark
World Championships
Silver medal – second place	2019 Basel	Men's singles
Bronze medal – third place	2021 Huelva	Men's singles
Bronze medal – third place	2023 Copenhagen	Men's singles
Bronze medal – third place	2025 Paris	Men's singles
Thomas Cup
Bronze medal – third place	2018 Bangkok	Men's team
Bronze medal – third place	2020 Aarhus	Men's team
Bronze medal – third place	2022 Bangkok	Men's team
Bronze medal – third place	2026 Horsens	Men's team
European Games
Gold medal – first place	2019 Minsk	Men's singles
European Championships
Gold medal – first place	2021 Kyiv	Men's singles
Gold medal – first place	2024 Saarbrücken	Men's singles
Silver medal – second place	2017 Kolding	Men's singles
Silver medal – second place	2022 Madrid	Men's singles
Silver medal – second place	2026 Huelva	Men's singles
European Mixed Team Championships
Gold medal – first place	2017 Lubin	Mixed team
Gold medal – first place	2019 Copenhagen	Mixed team
Gold medal – first place	2021 Vantaa	Mixed team
Gold medal – first place	2023 Aire-sur-la-Lys	Mixed team
Gold medal – first place	2025 Baku	Mixed team
European Men's Team Championships
Gold medal – first place	2016 Kazan	Men's team
Gold medal – first place	2018 Kazan	Men's team
Gold medal – first place	2020 Liévin	Men's team
Gold medal – first place	2024 Łódź	Men's team
Silver medal – second place	2026 Istanbul	Men's team
European Junior Championships
Gold medal – first place	2015 Lubin	Boys' singles
Bronze medal – third place	2015 Lubin	Mixed team

Anders Antonsen (born 27 April 1997) is a Danish professional badminton player. He is a four-time World Championships medallist, a two-time European Champion, a European Games gold medallist, and the current world No. 3 in the men's singles discipline of the BWF World Ranking.

At the World Championships, Antonsen won the silver medal in 2019 and three bronze medals in 2021, 2023, and 2025. On the continental stage, he captured European Championships gold in 2021 and 2024, alongside three silver medals in 2017, 2022, and 2026, as well as the men's singles title at the 2019 European Games. On the BWF World Tour, he has claimed multiple major titles, highlighted by the season-ending BWF World Tour Finals in 2020, two Super 1000 crowns at the 2024 Malaysia Open and 2025 Indonesia Open, and Super 750 titles at the Denmark Open (2020, 2024), China Masters, and French Open.

In team competition, Antonsen has represented Denmark to win four European Men's Team Championships (2016, 2018, 2020, and 2024) and five European Mixed Team Championships (2017, 2019, 2021, 2023, and 2025), alongside four Thomas Cup bronze medals (2018, 2020, 2022, and 2026).

== Career ==
Antonsen started his career in badminton at six years of age in Kastanievej, Viby. Together with his older brother Kasper Antonsen, he learned the sport from his father, Per Antonsen, who worked at the Aarhus AB badminton club.

=== 2013–2015: Senior debut and early international titles ===
Antonsen made his senior international debut at the 2013 Forza Denmark International while ranked outside the world's top 1,200. Progressing through the Danish youth system, Antonsen represented Denmark at the 2013 European U17 Championships in Russia, winning the boys' doubles gold medal alongside Rasmus Gemke. At the 2013 European Junior Championships in Ankara, he helped the national squad secure the mixed team bronze medal. His individual breakthrough at the junior level came in April 2015 at the European Junior Championships in Lubin, Poland. After helping Denmark earn a consecutive bronze medal in the mixed team event, Antonsen entered the boys' singles tournament as the top seed and captured the title by defeating German player Max Weißkirchen with a score of 21–9, 15–21, 21–9 in the final. Later that year, he competed at the BWF World Junior Championships in Lima, Peru, where he reached the fourth round of the boys' singles event before falling to Chinese Taipei's Lu Chia-hung.

Balancing youth tournaments with senior appearances on the European circuit throughout 2014, alongside competing domestically for Aarhus AB in the Danish Badminton League, he steadily climbed the rankings and broke into the top 800 by the end of the year. His transition to the senior ranks accelerated in April 2015 when he captured his maiden international title at the Dutch International, defeating Belgium's Yuhan Tan 21–11, 22–20 in the final. That victory propelled his world ranking into the top 400. In August, he reached the final of the Turkish International, finishing as the runner-up to Germany's Marc Zwiebler in three games. Antonsen added a second senior crown in September at the Belgian International, where he overcame top-seeded Frenchman Lucas Corvée in a three-game final with a score of 21–18, 17–21, 21–8. He followed this in October by advancing to the final of the Polish International, where he finished as runner-up to Malaysia's Iskandar Zulkarnain Zainuddin (12–21, 18–21). Concluding a productive 2015 campaign in December, Antonsen secured his third senior title of the season at the Irish Open, defeating Frenchman Lucas Claerbout 21–18, 22–20 in Dublin.

Following his unbeaten run on the European junior circuit, Antonsen was awarded the 2015 European Young Player of the Year by Badminton Europe. Driven by three international titles and two runner-up finishes during his final year of junior eligibility, Antonsen rose more than 600 places in the BWF World Rankings over the course of the season, concluding 2015 at world No. 131.

=== 2016–2018: First Grand Prix title, European silver, and top-20 breakthrough ===
Antonsen continued his upward trajectory in early 2016, winning the Swedish Masters by defeating Mattias Borg in January and the Austrian Open over Kanta Tsuneyama in February, results that lifted him into the world's top 60. In June, he claimed the Spanish International title after overcoming Kalle Koljonen in a three-game final. In November, Antonsen captured his first Grand Prix title at the Scottish Open Grand Prix, defeating Malaysia's Soong Joo Ven 22–20, 21–14 to finish the year ranked inside the world's top 30.

In February 2017, representing Aarhus AB, Antonsen won his first senior Danish National Championships title by defeating Rasmus Gemke in the final. In April, he made his debut at the European Championships in Kolding, where he won the silver medal after being defeated by Rajiv Ouseph of England with a tight score of 19–21, 19–21. Later that year, he established himself on the Superseries circuit by reaching the semi-finals in two consecutive tournaments: the 2017 French Open, where he lost to Kenta Nishimoto from Japan with a score of 17–21, 15–21, and the Hong Kong Open, where he was defeated by 2016 Rio Olympics gold medallist Chen Long from China with a score of 14–21, 21–19, 17–21. These performances propelled him to a year-end ranking inside the top 15.

In 2018, Antonsen successfully defended his national championship title and helped Denmark win gold at the European Men's Team Championships in Kazan. In May, he was chosen to be part of the Danish Thomas Cup squad in Bangkok and won a bronze medal. On the newly launched BWF World Tour, he reached the semi-finals of the Denmark Open Super 750 tournament on home soil in October, defeating Son Wan-ho before losing to Chinese Taipei player Chou Tien-chen with a score of 21–19, 11–21, 12–21. He concluded the year ranked inside the world's top 20.

=== 2019: Indonesia Masters title, European Games gold, and World Championships silver ===
Antonsen commenced the 2019 season ranked world No. 18. In January, he captured his maiden BWF World Tour title at the Indonesia Masters, a Super 500 event in Jakarta. After defeating Jonatan Christie in the semi-finals, Antonsen upset reigning World Champion and world No. 1 Kento Momota from Japan in the final with a score of 21–16, 14–21, 21–16. In February, playing for Aarhus AB, he won the National Championships title for the third time in a row, and subsequently helped the Danish national squad defend its title at the European Mixed Team Championships in Copenhagen. Later that month, he reached the final of the Spain Masters, finishing as runner-up to compatriot Viktor Axelsen (14–21, 11–21), which elevated his ranking to world No. 12.

After representing Denmark in its quarter-final run at the Sudirman Cup in May, Antonsen competed at the 2019 Minsk European Games in June. Entering as the top seed, he emerged as the men's singles champion and took the gold medal by beating Brice Leverdez of France in the final with a score of 21–19, 14–21, 21–10. In July, at the 2019 Indonesia Open, a Super 1000 tournament, Antonsen defeated Lee Zii Jia and Wong Wing Ki to reach his first Super 1000 final, where he finished as runner-up after losing a 91-minute encounter to Chou Tien-chen with a score of 18–21, 26–24, 15–21. This result propelled him into the world's top 10 for the first time.

In August, Antonsen entered the 2019 World Championships in Basel, Switzerland, as the fifth seed. He progressed to the championship match by overcoming Kanta Tsuneyama, defeating Olympic champion Chen Long 22–20, 21–10 in the quarter-finals, and beating Kantaphon Wangcharoen 21–15, 21–10 in the semi-finals. In the final, Antonsen captured the silver medal after losing to top seed and reigning champion Momota in straight games, 9–21, 3–21. Following the tournament, his ranking rose into the top five. In September, he advanced to his second Super 1000 final of the year at the China Open, where he was edged out by Momota in three games (21–19, 17–21, 19–21). Following a semi-final appearance at the Fuzhou China Open in November, Antonsen achieved a then career-high ranking of world No. 3 on 4 December and qualified for his first BWF World Tour Finals. For his achievements throughout the campaign, he was named the 2019 European Male Player of the Year.

=== 2020–2023: World Tour Finals title, European champion, World bronze, and injury struggles ===
Antonsen opened the 2020 season in January by reaching his third consecutive final in Jakarta at the Indonesia Masters, where he finished as runner-up to local favourite Anthony Sinisuka Ginting in three games (21–17, 15–21, 9–21). In February, he helped Denmark win a fourth consecutive gold medal at the European Men's Team Championships in Liévin, and reached the semi-finals of the All England Open in March before the COVID-19 pandemic suspended the international circuit. During the tournament hiatus, Antonsen launched a YouTube channel and podcast titled The Badminton Experience alongside compatriot Hans-Kristian Vittinghus to share insights into professional badminton. When the tour resumed in October, Antonsen captured his first Super 750 crown on home soil at the Denmark Open, overcoming Rasmus Gemke in the final (18–21, 21–19, 21–12). At the rescheduled Asian Leg in Bangkok in January 2021, Antonsen won the end-of-season 2020 BWF World Tour Finals, beating Viktor Axelsen 21–16, 5–21, 21–17 in the final.

In February 2021, Antonsen participated at the European Mixed Team Championships in Finland, and helped the team win the gold medal. Following a semi-final run at the All England Open in March, he competed at the May European Championships in Kyiv, where he was crowned as the men's singles champion after organisers decided to cancel the final due to his opponent, Axelsen, testing positive for COVID-19. In July, Antonsen made his Olympic debut at the 2020 Tokyo Olympics as the third seed. He advanced through the group stage without dropping a game and defeated Toby Penty in the round of 16, before bowing out in the quarter-finals to eventual bronze medallist Ginting (18–21, 21–15, 18–21). Later that year, he helped Denmark win bronze at the Thomas Cup on home soil in Aarhus and finished as runner-up to Momota at the Indonesia Masters. In December, Antonsen clinched a bronze medal after he lost in the semi-finals of the 2021 World Championships to Loh Kean Yew, the eventual World Champion, in straight games, 21–23, 14–21. Throughout the 2020 and 2021 seasons, he held the world No. 3 ranking.

Starting off the season in 2022, Antonsen managed to avenge his loss to Loh in the World Championships semi-finals, winning against the reigning world champion in the first round of the All England Open in three games, 21–15, 18–21, 21–13. He then lost in the next round to Lakshya Sen in straight games, 16–21, 18–21. On 30 April, Antonsen won silver at the European Championships, losing to compatriot Axelsen (17–21, 15–21) in the final in Madrid, Spain. Antonsen was very upset over the quality of his own play, saying audiences nearly deserved an apology. After helping Denmark win bronze at the Thomas Cup in May, Antonsen pulled out of the Asian leg of tournaments—the Indonesia Masters, Indonesia Open, Malaysia Open, Malaysia Masters, and Singapore Open—citing groin and abdominal injuries. Following a first-round exit at the World Championships in August, he briefly rose to a career-high ranking of world No. 2 in September before ending his season early to rehabilitate. Off the court in 2022, Antonsen departed the national training centre in Brøndby, relocated his training base to Dubai, and hired former world No. 6 Joachim Persson as his head coach. Due to his extended injury layoff, his ranking dropped to world No. 30 by early 2023.

Returning to fitness in 2023, Antonsen helped Denmark retain the European Mixed Team Championships title in February and reached the semi-finals of the All England Open and Spain Masters in March. In June, he advanced to his first final in over a year at the Singapore Open, finishing as runner-up to Ginting (16–21, 13–21). The following month, Antonsen ended a 30-month title drought by winning the Korea Open, defeating Shi Yuqi in the semi-finals and Loh Kean Yew in the final (11–21, 21–11, 21–19). In August, at the World Championships in Copenhagen, he defeated Ng Tze Yong, Lee Zii Jia, and Kenta Nishimoto without dropping a game before falling in the semi-finals to eventual champion Kunlavut Vitidsarn (21–18, 13–21, 17–21) to claim his third career World Championship medal. After reaching the semi-finals of the China Masters and the World Tour Finals late in the year, Antonsen re-entered the world's top 10, concluding 2023 ranked world No. 9.

=== 2024: First Super 1000 title, European champion, and four World Tour titles ===
Antonsen commenced the 2024 season ranked world No. 9. In the opening tournament of the year, the Malaysia Open, he captured his maiden Super 1000 title. Antonsen progressed to the championship match with victories over opponents including Chou Tien-chen and Lin Chun-yi, before defeating China's Shi Yuqi in straight games (21–14, 21–13). Two weeks later at the Indonesia Masters, a Super 500 event, he maintained his unbeaten start to the year by claiming a second consecutive title, overcoming Canada's Brian Yang in a three-game final (18–21, 21–13, 21–18). These back-to-back tournament victories propelled him back into the world's top five, climbing to world No. 3 by March.

In April, Antonsen competed at the European Championships in Saarbrücken. He secured his second continental crown by winning the gold medal without conceding a single game throughout the tournament, defeating France's Toma Junior Popov 21–18, 21–13 in the final. At the Indonesia Open in June, another Super 1000 event, Antonsen reached his third final of the season after overcoming Lakshya Sen and reigning world champion Kunlavut Vitidsarn. In the final, he was defeated in three games by Shi (9–21, 21–12, 14–21) to finish as runner-up.

Antonsen made his second Olympic appearance at the 2024 Paris Olympics. After topping his group with straight-game wins, he received a bye into the quarter-finals, where he was eliminated by Malaysia's Lee Zii Jia with a 17–21, 15–21 defeat. Later that month, Antonsen experienced an off-court setback when he abruptly terminated his coaching agreement with Joachim Persson. Antonsen reported Persson to the Badminton World Federation for violating betting integrity regulations after witnessing him place bets on a tournament match, subsequently appointing his brother Kasper Antonsen as his head coach in October. The period following the Olympics saw a brief decline in his ranking, falling to world No. 6 in September.

Antonsen regained his momentum in October on home soil at the Denmark Open in Odense. He overcame three-game encounters against Takuma Obayashi and Li Shifeng before defeating Japan's Koki Watanabe 21–15, 21–16 in the final to claim his second career Denmark Open crown. The following month at the China Masters, a Super 750 event in Shenzhen, Antonsen secured his fourth World Tour title of the season by defeating Jonatan Christie 21–15, 21–13 in the final, a victory that elevated him to world No. 2. At the year-ending World Tour Finals in Hangzhou, he progressed from the group stage and defeated Christie in a three-game semi-final, before finishing as runner-up to Shi (18–21, 14–21). Across a standout campaign highlighted by four World Tour titles and a European championship from six finals, Antonsen concluded the year ranked world No. 2.

=== 2025: Indonesia Open and French Open titles, World Championships bronze ===
Antonsen commenced his 2025 season ranked world No. 2, entering the Malaysia Open as the defending champion. He advanced to the championship match for the second consecutive year, but was unable to retain his title after a straight-game defeat to world No. 1 Shi Yuqi (8–21, 15–21). Following this runner-up finish, Antonsen experienced a dip in form during the early spring circuit, suffering an opening-round loss at the Indonesia Masters to Ng Ka Long, a second-round elimination at the All England Open, and an early exit at the Swiss Open. These setbacks caused his ranking to slide to world No. 3 in April.

He regained momentum in May at the Thailand Open, progressing to the final with victories over Wang Tzu-wei, Jeon Hyeok-jin, and Lu Guangzu. In the championship match, he was defeated in three games by home favourite Kunlavut Vitidsarn. After an early exit at the Singapore Open, Antonsen produced a standout performance at the Indonesia Open, a Super 1000 tournament. In the semi-finals, he completed a comeback victory over Shi Yuqi (9–21, 21–18, 21–19), before overcoming Chou Tien-chen 22–20, 21–14 in the final. The triumph marked his first title of the year and his second Indonesia Open crown, repeating his 2019 success and elevating him back to world No. 2.

In July, Antonsen reached the semi-finals of the China Open, before turning his attention to the World Championships held at the Adidas Arena in Paris in August. He advanced through the draw by overcoming Prannoy H. S. in a tight three-game encounter, Toma Junior Popov, and Chou Tien-chen in the quarter-finals. Antonsen was halted in the semi-finals by reigning champion Vitidsarn in straight games (17–21, 15–21), concluding the tournament with the bronze medal—his fourth career World Championship medal.

Antonsen continued his schedule in September at the Korea Open, where he reached his fourth final of the year but was edged out by Jonatan Christie in three games. A second-round exit at the Denmark Open briefly dropped him back to world No. 3, but he responded immediately at the French Open in Rennes. Antonsen defeated compatriot Viktor Axelsen in three games in the quarter-finals and Li Shifeng in the semi-finals, before overcoming local favourite Christo Popov 21–12, 21–19 in the final. The victory secured his first French Open title, making him only the fourth Danish men's singles player to win the tournament, and returned him to the world No. 2 ranking.

Antonsen concluded his season in December at the BWF World Tour Finals in Hangzhou, where he earned a group-stage win over Christie but was eliminated following three-game losses to Popov and Vitidsarn. Across a competitive campaign featuring five World Tour finals and a World Championship bronze medal, Antonsen concluded the year ranked world No. 3.

=== 2026: European Championships runner-up and three Super 500 titles ===
Antonsen commenced his 2026 season ranked world No. 3. At the Malaysia Open, he defeated Loh Kean Yew and Kenta Nishimoto to reach the semi-finals before losing to Shi Yuqi in straight games. After early-round exits at the Indonesia Masters and All England Open, he contested the European Championships in April. Antonsen advanced to the final without dropping a completed game, defeating Nhat Nguyen and Arnaud Merklé, before securing the silver medal following a 12–21, 19–21 loss to France's Christo Popov.

In May, Antonsen claimed his first title of the year at the Thailand Open, a Super 500 tournament. After receiving a semi-final walkover against Shi Yuqi, he faced home favourite Kunlavut Vitidsarn in the championship match. Despite dropping the opening game 9–21, Antonsen recovered to win the second 24–22 and took the deciding game 21–18 to secure the title. Following this victory, he rose to world No. 2 in early June.

However, subsequent quarter-final exits at the Singapore and Japan Opens, followed by an opening-round defeat at the China Open, checked his momentum. At the World Championships in New Delhi, Antonsen prevailed in a 102-minute encounter against Nguyen, saving two match points to win the third game 23–21. He then defeated Toma Junior Popov before falling in the quarter-finals to Kodai Naraoka (19–21, 15–21). Reflecting these mixed results over the following months, his ranking gradually dropped, touching a low of world No. 6 by early October.

Antonsen rebounded later that month at the Arctic Open. Following a three-game semi-final win over Lee Zii Jia, he faced Japan's Yushi Tanaka in an 86-minute final. After losing the first game, Antonsen saved a championship point in an extended decider to win 16–21, 21–16, 27–25. The victory earned him his second Super 500 title of the season and returned him to the world No. 2 position. A week after this title, Antonsen returned to his home country and advanced to the Denmark Open final but he lost against the reigning world champion, Alex Lanier with the score of 15–21, 21–13, 13–21. Antonsen finished the months with a semifinal berths at the 2026 Hylo Open, in which he had to retire from the second games after suffering a back injury against Indonesia's Jonatan Christie. Three weeks later, he returned to action at the Hong Kong Open where he won the title without playing in the final as his opponent, Kunlavut Vitidsarn pulled out also due to back injury.

== Personal life ==
Antonsen has an older brother, Kasper Antonsen, who is a Danish former badminton national player. Having trained alongside his brother since childhood under their father's guidance, Kasper later became Anders' head coach on the BWF World Tour. Outside of competitive play, Antonsen relocated his training base from Denmark to Dubai to establish an independent training setup. He is sponsored by the equipment manufacturer Victor, utilizing their high-performance racquets and apparel on the international circuit.

Antonsen is well-known for his media presence within the sport. He co-hosts the popular podcast The Badminton Experience alongside fellow Danish player Hans-Kristian Vittinghus, featuring technical discussions, Q&A sessions, and in-depth interviews with prominent international figures such as Lee Zii Jia, Greysia Polii, Anthony Sinisuka Ginting, and Peter Gade. Additionally, he runs an active YouTube channel documenting his training camps, vlogs, and behind-the-scenes life traveling across the global BWF circuit, accumulating over 116,000 subscribers.

== Achievements ==
=== World Championships ===
Men's singles
Year	Venue	Opponent	Score	Result	Ref.
2019	St. Jakobshalle, Basel, Switzerland	(Japan) Kento Momota	9–21, 3–21	Silver	
2021	Palacio de los Deportes Carolina Marín, Huelva, Spain	(Singapore) Loh Kean Yew	21–23, 14–21	Bronze	
2023	Royal Arena, Copenhagen, Denmark	(Japan) Kodai Naraoka	23–25, 12–21	Bronze	
2025	Adidas Arena, Paris, France	(Thailand) Kunlavut Vitidsarn	17–21, 15–21	Bronze	

=== European Games ===
Men's singles
Year	Venue	Opponent	Score	Result	Ref.
2019	Falcon Club, Minsk, Belarus	(France) Brice Leverdez	21–19, 14–21, 21–10	Gold	

=== European Championships ===
Men's singles
Year	Venue	Opponent	Score	Result	Ref.
2017	Sydbank Arena, Kolding, Denmark	(England) Rajiv Ouseph	19–21, 19–21	Silver	
2021	Palace of Sports, Kyiv, Ukraine	(Denmark) Viktor Axelsen	Walkover	Gold	
2022	Polideportivo Municipal Gallur, Madrid, Spain	(Denmark) Viktor Axelsen	17–21, 15–21	Silver	
2024	Saarlandhalle, Saarbrücken, Germany	(France) Toma Junior Popov	21–18, 21–13	Gold	
2026	Palacio de los Deportes Carolina Marín, Huelva, Spain	(France) Christo Popov	12–21, 19–21	Silver	

=== European Junior Championships ===
Boys' singles
Year	Venue	Opponent	Score	Result	Ref.
2015	Regional Sport Centrum Hall, Lubin, Poland	(Germany) Max Weißkirchen	21–9, 15–21, 21–9	Gold	

=== BWF World Tour (13 titles, 11 runners-up) ===
The BWF World Tour, which was announced on 19 March 2017 and implemented in 2018, is a series of elite badminton tournaments sanctioned by the Badminton World Federation (BWF). The BWF World Tour is divided into levels of World Tour Finals, Super 1000, Super 750, Super 500, Super 300 (part of the HSBC World Tour), and the BWF Tour Super 100.

Men's singles
Year	Tournament	Level	Opponent	Score	Result	Ref.
2019	Indonesia Masters	Super 500	(Japan) Kento Momota	21–16, 14–21, 21–16	(gold) Winner	
2019	Spain Masters	Super 300	(Denmark) Viktor Axelsen	14–21, 11–21	(silver) Runner-up	
2019	Indonesia Open	Super 1000	(Chinese Taipei) Chou Tien-chen	18–21, 26–24, 15–21	(silver) Runner-up	
2020	Indonesia Masters	Super 500	(Indonesia) Anthony Sinisuka Ginting	21–17, 15–21, 9–21	(silver) Runner-up	
2020	Denmark Open	Super 750	(Denmark) Rasmus Gemke	18–21, 21–19, 21–12	(gold) Winner	
2020	BWF World Tour Finals	World Tour Finals	(Denmark) Viktor Axelsen	21–16, 5–21, 21–17	(gold) Winner	
2021	Indonesia Masters	Super 750	(Japan) Kento Momota	17–21, 11–21	(silver) Runner-up	
2023	Singapore Open	Super 750	(Indonesia) Anthony Sinisuka Ginting	16–21, 13–21	(silver) Runner-up	
2023	Korea Open	Super 500	(Singapore) Loh Kean Yew	11–21, 21–11, 21–19	(gold) Winner	
2024	Malaysia Open	Super 1000	(China) Shi Yuqi	21–14, 21–13	(gold) Winner	
2024	Indonesia Masters	Super 500	(Canada) Brian Yang	18–21, 21–13, 21–18	(gold) Winner	
2024	Indonesia Open	Super 1000	(China) Shi Yuqi	9–21, 21–12, 14–21	(silver) Runner-up	
2024	Denmark Open	Super 750	(Japan) Koki Watanabe	21–15, 21–16	(gold) Winner	
2024	China Masters	Super 750	(Indonesia) Jonatan Christie	21–15, 21–13	(gold) Winner	
2024	BWF World Tour Finals	World Tour Finals	(China) Shi Yuqi	18–21, 14–21	(silver) Runner-up	
2025	Malaysia Open	Super 1000	(China) Shi Yuqi	8–21, 15–21	(silver) Runner-up	
2025	Thailand Open	Super 500	(Thailand) Kunlavut Vitidsarn	16–21, 21–17, 9–21	(silver) Runner-up	
2025	Indonesia Open	Super 1000	(Chinese Taipei) Chou Tien-chen	22–20, 21–14	(gold) Winner	
2025	Korea Open	Super 500	(Indonesia) Jonatan Christie	10–21, 21–15, 17–21	(silver) Runner-up	
2025	French Open	Super 750	(France) Christo Popov	21–12, 21–19	(gold) Winner	
2026	Thailand Open	Super 500	(Thailand) Kunlavut Vitidsarn	9–21, 24–22, 21–18	(gold) Winner	
2026	Arctic Open	Super 500	(Japan) Yushi Tanaka	16–21, 21–16, 27–25	(gold) Winner	
2026	Denmark Open	Super 750	(France) Alex Lanier	16–21, 21–16, 13–21	(silver) Runner-up	
2026	Hong Kong Open	Super 500	(Thailand) Kunlavut Vitidsarn	walkover	(gold) Winner	

=== BWF Grand Prix (1 title) ===
The BWF Grand Prix had two levels, the Grand Prix and Grand Prix Gold. It was a series of badminton tournaments sanctioned by the Badminton World Federation (BWF) and played between 2007 and 2017.

Men's singles
Year	Tournament	Opponent	Score	Result	Ref.
2016	Scottish Open	(Malaysia) Soong Joo Ven	22–20, 21–15	(gold) Winner	

BWF Grand Prix Gold tournament
BWF Grand Prix tournament

=== BWF International Challenge/Series (6 titles, 1 runner-up) ===
Men's singles
Year	Tournament	Opponent	Score	Result	Ref.
2015	Dutch International	(Belgium) Yuhan Tan	21–11, 22–20	(gold) Winner	
2015	Belgian International	(Denmark) Christian Lind Thomsen	21–18, 21–17	(gold) Winner	
2015	Polish International	(Malaysia) Iskandar Zulkarnain Zainuddin	12–21, 18–21	(silver) Runner-up	
2015	Irish Open	(France) Lucas Claerbout	21–18, 22–20	(gold) Winner	
2016	Swedish Masters	(Sweden) Mattias Borg	21–12, 21–10	(gold) Winner	
2016	Austrian Open	(Japan) Kanta Tsuneyama	21–9, 21–17	(gold) Winner	
2016	Spanish International	(Japan) Kanta Tsuneyama	14–21, 22–20, 21–18	(gold) Winner	

BWF International Challenge tournament
BWF International Series tournament
BWF Future Series tournament

== Record against selected opponents ==
Record against Year-end Finals finalists, World Championships semi-finalists, and Olympic quarter-finalists. Accurate as of 23 December 2025.

Player	Matches	Win	Lost	Diff.
(China) Chen Long	7	2	5	–3
(China) Lin Dan	1	1	0	+1
(China) Shi Yuqi	13	4	9	–5
(China) Zhao Junpeng	1	1	0	+1
(Chinese Taipei) Chou Tien-chen	16	8	8	0
(Denmark) Viktor Axelsen	12	5	7	–2
(Denmark) Jan Ø. Jørgensen	1	1	0	+1
(Denmark) Hans-Kristian Vittinghus	3	2	1	+1
(England) Rajiv Ouseph	4	3	1	+2
(France) Christo Popov	6	3	3	0
(India) Parupalli Kashyap	1	0	1	–1
(India) Srikanth Kidambi	6	3	3	0
(India) B. Sai Praneeth	4	3	1	+2
(India) Prannoy H. S.	5	3	2	+1

Player	Matches	Win	Lost	Diff.
(India) Lakshya Sen	8	5	3	+2
(Indonesia) Anthony Sinisuka Ginting	9	3	6	–3
(Indonesia) Tommy Sugiarto	1	1	0	+1
(Japan) Kento Momota	7	1	6	–5
(Japan) Kodai Naraoka	9	5	4	+1
(Malaysia) Lee Chong Wei	1	0	1	–1
(Malaysia) Lee Zii Jia	10	5	5	0
(Malaysia) Liew Daren	2	1	1	0
(Singapore) Loh Kean Yew	8	4	4	0
(South Korea) Heo Kwang-hee	1	0	1	–1
(South Korea) Son Wan-ho	5	3	2	+1
(Thailand) Kunlavut Vitidsarn	11	7	4	+3
(Thailand) Kantaphon Wangcharoen	4	4	0	+4
(Vietnam) Nguyễn Tiến Minh	2	2	0	+2
