= 2026 Japan Open =

Badminton tournament in Japan

Tournament details
- Dates: 14–19 July
- Edition: 43rd
- Level: Super 750
- Total prize money: US$950,000
- Venue: Tokyo Metropolitan Gymnasium
- Location: Tokyo, Japan

Champions
- Men's singles: (France) Christo Popov
- Women's singles: (India) P. V. Sindhu
- Men's doubles: (Indonesia) Fajar Alfian (Indonesia) Muhammad Shohibul Fikri
- Women's doubles: (South Korea) Kim Hye-jeong (South Korea) Kong Hee-yong
- Mixed doubles: (China) Feng Yanzhe (China) Huang Dongping
- Official website: daihatsu-japan-open.com/2026/

The 2026 Japan Open (officially known as the Daihatsu Japan Open 2026) was a badminton tournament which took place at Tokyo Metropolitan Gymnasium in Tokyo, Japan, from 14 to 19 July 2026. The total prize money was $950,000.

== Tournament ==
The 2026 Japan Open was the nineteenth tournament of the 2026 BWF World Tour and also part of the Japan Open championships, which have been held since 1982. This tournament was organized by the Badminton Association of Japan with sanction from the BWF.

=== Venue ===
This international tournament was held at Tokyo Metropolitan Gymnasium in Tokyo, Japan.

=== Point distribution ===
Below was the point distribution table for each phase of the tournament based on the BWF points system for the BWF World Tour Super 750 event.

Winner	Runner-up	3/4	5/8	9/16	17/32
11,000	9,350	7,700	6,050	4,320	2,660

=== Prize pool ===
The total prize money will be US$950,000 with the distribution of the prize money in accordance with BWF regulations.

Event	Winner	Finalist	Semi-finals	Quarter-finals	Last 16	Last 32
Singles	$66,500	$32,300	$13,300	$5,225	$2,850	$950
Doubles	$70,300	$33,250	$13,300	$5,937.50	$3,087.50	$950

== Men's singles ==
=== Seeds ===
1. (China) Shi Yuqi (quarter-finals)
2. (Thailand) Kunlavut Vitidsarn (quarter-finals)
3. (Denmark) Anders Antonsen (quarter-finals)
4. (Indonesia) Jonatan Christie (first round)
5. (France) Christo Popov (champion)
6. (Chinese Taipei) Chou Tien-chen (first round)
7. (France) Alex Lanier (second round)
8. (China) Li Shifeng (first round)

=== Finals ===
Semi-finals
5	(France) Christo Popov	21	21
(Japan) Kodai Naraoka	14	11
(Japan) Koki Watanabe	19	23	21
(Japan) Yushi Tanaka	21	21	19

Final
5	(France) Christo Popov	21	21
(Japan) Koki Watanabe	11	19

=== Top half ===
==== Section 1 ====
First round
1	(China) Shi YQ	21	21
(Japan) Y Okimoto	15	15
(Singapore) Loh K Y	17	21	18
(Canada) B Yang	21	18	21
5	(France) C Popov	21	23
(China) Weng HY	14	21
(Chinese Taipei) Chi Y-j	19	16
(Malaysia) Leong J H	21	21

Second round
1	(China) Shi YQ	16	21	21
(Canada) B Yang	21	19	18
5	(France) C Popov	16	21	21
(Malaysia) Leong J H	21	11	17

Quarter-finals
1	(China) Shi YQ	21	10	11
5	(France) C Popov	14	21	21

==== Section 2 ====
First round
4	(Indonesia) J Christie	16	14
(Thailand) Pan Teeraratsakul	21	21
(Chinese Taipei) Lin C-y	17	19
(Japan) K Naraoka	21	21
7	(France) A Lanier	21	21
(Chinese Taipei) Lee C-h	15	18
(Indonesia) A Farhan	21	21
(Japan) K Nishimoto	14	11

Second round
(Thailand) Pan Teeraratsakul	21	16	16
(Japan) K Naraoka	10	21	21
7	(France) A Lanier	21	14	16
(Indonesia) A Farhan	9	21	21

Quarter-finals
(Japan) K Naraoka	21	20	21
(Indonesia) A Farhan	18	22	18

=== Bottom half ===
==== Section 3 ====
First round
(India) L Sen	16	14
(Japan) K Watanabe	21	21
(Republic of Ireland) N Nguyen	21	21
6	(Chinese Taipei) Chou T-c	19	6
(Indonesia) Z Ubaidillah	21	16	21
(Denmark) R Gemke	14	21	18
(France) T J Popov	17	13
3	(Denmark) A Antonsen	21	21

Second round
(Japan) K Watanabe	21	21
(Republic of Ireland) N Nguyen	15	19
(Indonesia) Z Ubaidillah	12	19
3	(Denmark) A Antonsen	21	21

Quarter-finals
(Japan) K Watanabe	21	21
3	(Denmark) A Antonsen	13	17

==== Section 4 ====
First round
(Hong Kong) Lee C Y	23	21
(China) Lu GZ	21	10
(Japan) Y Tanaka	21	19	21
8	(China) Li SF	17	21	15
(Hong Kong) Ng K L	19	14
(Singapore) J Teh	21	21
(India) A Shetty	19	25	15
2	(Thailand) K Vitidsarn	21	23	21

Second round
(Hong Kong) Lee C Y	21	10	11
(Japan) Y Tanaka	14	21	21
(Singapore) J Teh	11	16
2	(Thailand) K Vitidsarn	21	21

Quarter-finals
(Japan) Y Tanaka	20	21	21
2	(Thailand) K Vitidsarn	22	16	18

== Women's singles ==
=== Seeds ===
1. (South Korea) An Se-young (second round)
2. (China) Wang Zhiyi (quarter-finals)
3. (Japan) Akane Yamaguchi (final)
4. (China) Chen Yufei (semi-finals)
5. (China) Han Yue (second round)
6. (Indonesia) Putri Kusuma Wardani (semi-finals)
7. (Thailand) Ratchanok Intanon (first round)
8. (Thailand) Pornpawee Chochuwong (second round)

=== Finals ===
Semi-finals
(India) P. V. Sindhu	21	15
4	(China) Chen Yufei	19	10^{r}
3	(Japan) Akane Yamaguchi	9	21	21
6	(Indonesia) Putri Kusuma Wardani	21	16	14

Final
(India) P. V. Sindhu	21	21
3	(Japan) Akane Yamaguchi	17	17

=== Top half ===
==== Section 1 ====
First round
1	(South Korea) An S-y	21	21
(Japan) H Akechi	6	9
(China) Han QX	21	11	14
(Japan) N Okuhara	11	21	21
5	(China) Han Y	21	21
(Japan) T Miyazaki	10	12
(India) P. V. Sindhu	21	21
(Malaysia) Wong L C	14	11

Second round
1	(South Korea) An S-y
(Japan) N Okuhara	w	/	o
5	(China) Han Y	16	14
(India) P. V. Sindhu	21	21

Quarter-finals
(Japan) N Okuhara
(India) P. V. Sindhu	w	/	o

==== Section 2 ====
First round
4	(China) Chen YF	23	21
(Thailand) S Katethong	21	12
(Ukraine) P Buhrova	18	22	22
(Japan) R Gunji	21	20	20
7	(Thailand) R Intanon	18	19
(South Korea) Sim Y-j	21	21
(Thailand) B Ongbamrungphan	17	12
(Canada) M Li	21	21

Second round
4	(China) Chen YF	21	21
(Ukraine) P Buhrova	14	11
(South Korea) Sim Y-j	18	21	21
(Canada) M Li	21	19	16

Quarter-finals
4	(China) Chen YF	21	21
(South Korea) Sim Y-j	10	12

=== Bottom half ===
==== Section 3 ====
First round
(Malaysia) Letshanaa K	16	12
(South Korea) Kim G-e	21	21
(Chinese Taipei) Chiu P-c	14	16
8	(Thailand) P Chochuwong	21	21
(Turkey) N Arın	13	13
(Thailand) P Opatniputh	21	21
(Japan) N Nidaira	12	12
3	(Japan) A Yamaguchi	21	21

Second round
(South Korea) Kim G-e	w	/	o
8	(Thailand) P Chochuwong
(Thailand) P Opatniputh	21	15	11
3	(Japan) A Yamaguchi	17	21	21

Quarter-finals
(South Korea) Kim G-e	21	13	20
3	(Japan) A Yamaguchi	14	21	22

==== Section 4 ====
First round
(Chinese Taipei) Huang Y-h	16	21	21
(India) U Hooda	21	16	15
(United States) BW Zhang	6	15
6	(Indonesia) P K Wardani	21	21
(Scotland) K Gilmour	19	19
(Chinese Taipei) Lin H-t	21	21
(Chinese Taipei) Sung S-y	7	12
2	(China) Wang ZY	21	21

Second round
(Chinese Taipei) Huang Y-h	19	9
6	(Indonesia) P K Wardani	21	21
(Chinese Taipei) Lin H-t	15	11
2	(China) Wang ZY	21	21

Quarter-finals
6	(Indonesia) P K Wardani	9	21	21
2	(China) Wang ZY	21	17	4

== Men's doubles ==
=== Seeds ===
1. (South Korea) Kim Won-ho / Seo Seung-jae (final)
2. (Indonesia) Fajar Alfian / Muhammad Shohibul Fikri (champions)
3. (India) Satwiksairaj Rankireddy / Chirag Shetty (first round)
4. (China) Liang Weikeng / Wang Chang (quarter-finals)
5. (Malaysia) Goh Sze Fei / Nur Izzuddin (semi-finals)
6. (Indonesia) Sabar Karyaman Gutama / Muhammad Reza Pahlevi Isfahani (second round)
7. (China) Chen Boyang / Liu Yi (first round)
8. (Japan) Takuro Hoki / Yugo Kobayashi (semi-finals)

=== Finals ===
Semi-finals
1	(South Korea) Kim Won-ho (South Korea) Seo Seung-jae	21	11	21
5	(Malaysia) Goh Sze Fei (Malaysia) Nur Izzuddin	12	21	13
8	(Japan) Takuro Hoki (Japan) Yugo Kobayashi	14	21	18
2	(Indonesia) Fajar Alfian (Indonesia) Muhammad Shohibul Fikri	21	19	21

Final
1	(South Korea) Kim Won-ho (South Korea) Seo Seung-jae	19	17
2	(Indonesia) Fajar Alfian (Indonesia) Muhammad Shohibul Fikri	21	21

=== Top half ===
==== Section 1 ====
First round
1	(South Korea) Kim W-h (South Korea) Seo S-j	17	21	21
(Thailand) P Sukphun (Thailand) Pak Teeraratsakul	21	13	11
(Japan) K Kumagai (Japan) H Nishi	21	21
(Japan) T Nomura (Japan) Y Shimogami	13	16
7	(China) Chen BY (China) Liu Yi	21	24	15
(Malaysia) Kang K X (Malaysia) A Tai	11	26	21
(India) H Amsakarunan (India) Arjun M. R.	13	21	7
(Chinese Taipei) Lee J-h (Chinese Taipei) Yang P-h	21	17	21

Second round
1	(South Korea) Kim W-h (South Korea) Seo S-j	21	21
(Japan) K Kumagai (Japan) H Nishi	14	18
(Malaysia) Kang K X (Malaysia) A Tai	21	21
(Chinese Taipei) Lee J-h (Chinese Taipei) Yang P-h	10	15

Quarter-finals
1	(South Korea) Kim W-h (South Korea) Seo S-j	21	21
(Malaysia) Kang K X (Malaysia) A Tai	13	10

==== Section 2 ====
First round
3	(India) S Rankireddy (India) C Shetty	19	0^{r}
(Denmark) D Lundgaard (Denmark) M Vestergaard	21	0
(United States) Chen Z-y (United States) P Smith	26	15	21
(Malaysia) J Arif (Malaysia) Yap R K	24	21	18
5	(Malaysia) Goh S F (Malaysia) N Izzuddin	22	21
(China) Hu KY (China) Lin XY	20	18
PFR	(Japan) K Matsui (Japan) K Mitsuhashi	21	16
(Denmark) K Astrup (Denmark) A S Rasmussen	23	21

Second round
(Denmark) D Lundgaard (Denmark) M Vestergaard	15	12
(United States) Chen Z-y (United States) P Smith	21	21
5	(Malaysia) Goh S F (Malaysia) N Izzuddin	21	21
(Denmark) K Astrup (Denmark) A S Rasmussen	18	19

Quarter-finals
(United States) Chen Z-y (United States) P Smith	18	21	13
5	(Malaysia) Goh S F (Malaysia) N Izzuddin	21	15	21

=== Bottom half ===
==== Section 3 ====
First round
(Indonesia) R Indra (Indonesia) N Joaquin	16	23	10
(Japan) H Kawabe (Japan) K Matsukawa	21	21	21
(Malaysia) N M Azriyn A (Malaysia) Tan W K	17	14
8	(Japan) T Hoki (Japan) Y Kobayashi	21	21
(Canada) K Lee (Canada) T A Lindeman	5	14
(China) Huang D (China) Liu Ya	21	21
(South Korea) Choi S-g (Malaysia) Goh V S	11	11
4	(China) Liang WK (China) Wang C	21	21

Second round
(Japan) H Kawabe (Japan) K Matsukawa	19	21	19
8	(Japan) T Hoki (Japan) Y Kobayashi	21	19	21
(China) Huang D (China) Liu Ya	17	15
4	(China) Liang WK (China) Wang C	21	21

Quarter-finals
8	(Japan) T Hoki (Japan) Y Kobayashi	21	21
4	(China) Liang WK (China) Wang C	12	19

==== Section 4 ====
First round
(England) B Lane (England) S Vendy	21	22
(Chinese Taipei) He Z-w (Chinese Taipei) Huang J-h	16	20
(Chinese Taipei) Chiu H-c (Chinese Taipei) Wang C-l	18	21	16
6	(Indonesia) S K Gutama (Indonesia) M R P Isfahani	21	17	21
(Chinese Taipei) Lee F-c (Chinese Taipei) Lee F-j	21	21	21
(Malaysia) Man W C (Malaysia) Soh W Y	23	17	16
(France) C Popov (France) T J Popov	19	13
2	(Indonesia) F Alfian (Indonesia) M S Fikri	21	21

Second round
(England) B Lane (England) S Vendy	21	21
6	(Indonesia) S K Gutama (Indonesia) M R P Isfahani	11	17
(Chinese Taipei) Lee F-c (Chinese Taipei) Lee F-j	14	14
2	(Indonesia) F Alfian (Indonesia) M S Fikri	21	21

Quarter-finals
(England) B Lane (England) S Vendy	20	13
2	(Indonesia) F Alfian (Indonesia) M S Fikri	22	21

== Women's doubles ==
=== Seeds ===
1. (China) Liu Shengshu / Tan Ning (second round)
2. (China) Jia Yifan / Zhang Shuxian (final)
3. (South Korea) Baek Ha-na / Lee So-hee (second round)
4. (Japan) Yuki Fukushima / Mayu Matsumoto (semi-finals)
5. (Malaysia) Pearly Tan / Thinaah Muralitharan (first round)
6. (South Korea) Kim Hye-jeong / Kong Hee-yong (champions)
7. (Japan) Rin Iwanaga / Kie Nakanishi (second round)
8. (Chinese Taipei) Hsieh Pei-shan / Hung En-tzu (first round)

=== Finals ===
Semi-finals
(Chinese Taipei) Hsu Yin-hui (Chinese Taipei) Lin Jhih-yun	18	18
6	(South Korea) Kim Hye-jeong (South Korea) Kong Hee-yong	21	21
4	(Japan) Yuki Fukushima (Japan) Mayu Matsumoto	15	21	21
2	(China) Jia Yifan (China) Zhang Shuxian	21	12	23

Final
6	(South Korea) Kim Hye-jeong (South Korea) Kong Hee-yong	14	21	30
2	(China) Jia Yifan (China) Zhang Shuxian	21	15	29

=== Top half ===
==== Section 1 ====
First round
1	(China) Liu SS (China) Tan N	21	11	21
PFR	(Thailand) H Mijad (Thailand) N Tungkasatan	12	21	17
(Chinese Taipei) Chang C-h (Chinese Taipei) Yang C-t	16	8
(Indonesia) F D Kusuma (Indonesia) M T Puspita Sari	21	21
5	(Malaysia) P Tan (Malaysia) Thinaah M	21	17	17
(Chinese Taipei) Hsu Y-h (Chinese Taipei) Lin J-y	9	21	21
(Hong Kong) Lui L L (Hong Kong) Tsang H Y	21	21
(Ukraine) P Buhrova (Ukraine) Y Kantemyr	12	10

Second round
1	(China) Liu SS (China) Tan N
(Indonesia) F D Kusuma (Indonesia) M T Puspita Sari	w	/	o
(Chinese Taipei) Hsu Y-h (Chinese Taipei) Lin J-y	21	21
(Hong Kong) Lui L L (Hong Kong) Tsang H Y	7	10

Quarter-finals
(Indonesia) F D Kusuma (Indonesia) M T Puspita Sari	18	15
(Chinese Taipei) Hsu Y-h (Chinese Taipei) Lin J-y	21	21

==== Section 2 ====
First round
3	(South Korea) Baek H-n (South Korea) Lee S-h	21	21
(Malaysia) Ong X Y (Malaysia) C Ting	12	18
(Chinese Taipei) Hu L-f (Chinese Taipei) Jheng Y-c	15	12
(United States) L Lam (United States) A Lee	21	21
6	(South Korea) Kim H-j (South Korea) Kong H-y	21	16	21
(China) Luo Y (China) Wang TG	14	21	14
(Japan) S Hirota (Japan) A Sakuramoto	21	21
(Scotland) J MacPherson (Scotland) C Torrance	15	5

Second round
3	(South Korea) Baek H-n (South Korea) Lee S-h	21	18	12
(United States) L Lam (United States) A Lee	9	21	21
6	(South Korea) Kim H-j (South Korea) Kong H-y	21	22
(Japan) S Hirota (Japan) A Sakuramoto	11	20

Quarter-finals
(United States) L Lam (United States) A Lee	13	13
6	(South Korea) Kim H-j (South Korea) Kong H-y	21	21

=== Bottom half ===
==== Section 3 ====
First round
(Japan) H Suzuki (Japan) N Yamakita	22	15	21
(Thailand) B Aimsaard (Thailand) N Aimsaard	20	21	18
(Turkey) B Erçetin (Turkey) N İnci	17	16
7	(Japan) R Iwanaga (Japan) K Nakanishi	21	21
(Japan) K Osawa (Japan) M Tanabe	8	18
(Hong Kong) Yeung N T (Hong Kong) Yeung P L	21	21
(United States) F Corbett (United States) J Gai	17	19
4	(Japan) Y Fukushima (Japan) M Matsumoto	21	21

Second round
(Japan) H Suzuki (Japan) N Yamakita	21	18	21
7	(Japan) R Iwanaga (Japan) K Nakanishi	15	21	11
(Hong Kong) Yeung N T (Hong Kong) Yeung P L	21	14	19
4	(Japan) Y Fukushima (Japan) M Matsumoto	19	21	21

Quarter-finals
(Japan) H Suzuki (Japan) N Yamakita	14	10
4	(Japan) Y Fukushima (Japan) M Matsumoto	21	21

==== Section 4 ====
First round
(Japan) R Hirokami (Japan) S Hobara	21	21
(Indonesia) A C Pratiwi (Indonesia) S F S Ramadhanti	16	16
(Bulgaria) G Stoeva (Bulgaria) S Stoeva	21	21
8	(Chinese Taipei) Hsieh P-s (Chinese Taipei) Hung E-t	16	10
(Chinese Taipei) Hsu Y-c (Chinese Taipei) Sung Y-h	18	21	22
(Japan) R Hiramoto (Japan) K Ishikawa	21	19	20
(Indonesia) R A Rose (Indonesia) F Setianingrum	11	21	14
2	(China) Jia YF (China) Zhang SX	21	19	21

Second round
(Japan) R Hirokami (Japan) S Hobara	18	15
(Bulgaria) G Stoeva (Bulgaria) S Stoeva	21	21
(Chinese Taipei) Hsu Y-c (Chinese Taipei) Sung Y-h	16	21	10
2	(China) Jia YF (China) Zhang SX	21	18	21

Quarter-finals
(Bulgaria) G Stoeva (Bulgaria) S Stoeva	12	12
2	(China) Jia YF (China) Zhang SX	21	21

== Mixed doubles ==
=== Seeds ===
1. (China) Feng Yanzhe / Huang Dongping (champions)
2. (China) Jiang Zhenbang / Wei Yaxin (quarter-finals)
3. (Denmark) Mathias Christiansen / Alexandra Bøje (quarter-finals)
4. (Thailand) Dechapol Puavaranukroh / Supissara Paewsampran (second round)
5. (China) Guo Xinwa / Chen Fanghui (second round)
6. (France) Thom Gicquel / Delphine Delrue (second round)
7. (Hong Kong) Tang Chun Man / Tse Ying Suet (final)
8. (China) Cheng Xing / Zhang Chi (first round)

=== Finals ===
Semi-finals
1	(China) Feng Yanzhe (China) Huang Dongping	21	21
(Japan) Akira Koga (Japan) Natsu Saito	13	8
(Malaysia) Jimmy Wong (Malaysia) Cheng Su Yin	21	18	15
7	(Hong Kong) Tang Chun Man (Hong Kong) Tse Ying Suet	17	21	21

Final
1	(China) Feng Yanzhe (China) Huang Dongping	21	14	21
7	(Hong Kong) Tang Chun Man (Hong Kong) Tse Ying Suet	14	21	15

=== Top half ===
==== Section 1 ====
First round
1	(China) Feng YZ (China) Huang DP	21	21
(India) R Kapoor (India) R Gadde	11	10
(Scotland) A Dunn (Scotland) J MacPherson	16	14
(India) D Kapila (India) T Crasto	21	21
5	(China) Guo XW (China) Chen FH	21	21
(Malaysia) Wong T C (Malaysia) Lim C S	13	18
(Thailand) Pak Teeraratsakul (Thailand) S Taerattanachai	21	19	19
(Chinese Taipei) Ye H-w (Chinese Taipei) N G Chan	15	21	21

Second round
1	(China) Feng YZ (China) Huang DP	22	21
(India) D Kapila (India) T Crasto	20	17
5	(China) Guo XW (China) Chen FH	21	18	19
(Chinese Taipei) Ye H-w (Chinese Taipei) N G Chan	11	21	21

Quarter-finals
1	(China) Feng YZ (China) Huang DP	21	21
(Chinese Taipei) Ye H-w (Chinese Taipei) N G Chan	5	17

==== Section 2 ====
First round
4	(Thailand) D Puavaranukroh (Thailand) S Paewsampran	21	21
(Thailand) S Jomkoh (Thailand) O Jongsathapornparn	19	12
(Malaysia) Chen T J (Malaysia) C San	15	19
(Chinese Taipei) Yang P-h (Chinese Taipei) Hu L-f	21	21
8	(China) Cheng X (China) Zhang C	14	21	14
(Japan) A Koga (Japan) N Saito	21	18	21
(Japan) Y Watanabe (Japan) M Taguchi	22	21
PFR	(Chinese Taipei) Liu K-h (Chinese Taipei) Hsu Y-h	20	18

Second round
4	(Thailand) D Puavaranukroh (Thailand) S Paewsampran	16	16
(Chinese Taipei) Yang P-h (Chinese Taipei) Hu L-f	21	21
(Japan) A Koga (Japan) N Saito	21	17	21
(Japan) Y Watanabe (Japan) M Taguchi	10	21	8

Quarter-finals
(Chinese Taipei) Yang P-h (Chinese Taipei) Hu L-f	14	21	13
(Japan) A Koga (Japan) N Saito	21	17	21

=== Bottom half ===
==== Section 3 ====
First round
(Malaysia) J Wong (Malaysia) Cheng S Y	21	11	21
(Japan) Y Shimogami (Japan) S Hobara	19	21	19
(Indonesia) A Syahnawi (Indonesia) N V Marwah	18	21
6	(France) T Gicquel (France) D Delrue	21	23
(Germany) M Seidel (Germany) T P Nguyen	23	17
(South Korea) Kim J-h (South Korea) Jang H-j	25	21
(England) Chun K L (England) K Feng	2	6
3	(Denmark) M Christiansen (Denmark) A Bøje	21	21

Second round
(Malaysia) J Wong (Malaysia) Cheng S Y	23	24
6	(France) T Gicquel (France) D Delrue	21	22
(South Korea) Kim J-h (South Korea) Jang H-j	12	20
3	(Denmark) M Christiansen (Denmark) A Bøje	21	22

Quarter-finals
(Malaysia) J Wong (Malaysia) Cheng S Y	21	21
3	(Denmark) M Christiansen (Denmark) A Bøje	17	17

==== Section 4 ====
First round
(United States) P Smith (United States) J Gai	21	17	20
(Hong Kong) Chan Y C (Hong Kong) Ng T Y	18	21	22
(Turkey) E Sönmez (Turkey) Y Bektaş	13	11
7	(Hong Kong) Tang C M (Hong Kong) Tse Y S	21	21
(United States) Chen Z-y (United States) F Corbett	13	20
(Malaysia) Goh S H (Malaysia) S J Lai	21	22
(Japan) H Midorikawa (Japan) M Matsutomo	15	21	12
2	(China) Jiang ZB (China) Wei YX	21	17	21

Second round
(Hong Kong) Chan Y C (Hong Kong) Ng T Y	15	10
7	(Hong Kong) Tang C M (Hong Kong) Tse Y S	21	21
(Malaysia) Goh S H (Malaysia) S J Lai	14	7
2	(China) Jiang ZB (China) Wei YX	21	21

Quarter-finals
7	(Hong Kong) Tang C M (Hong Kong) Tse Y S	21	21
2	(China) Jiang ZB (China) Wei YX	17	13

Preceded by 2026 Canada Open	BWF World Tour; 2026 BWF season	Succeeded by 2026 China Open
