= Koki Watanabe =

Japanese badminton player

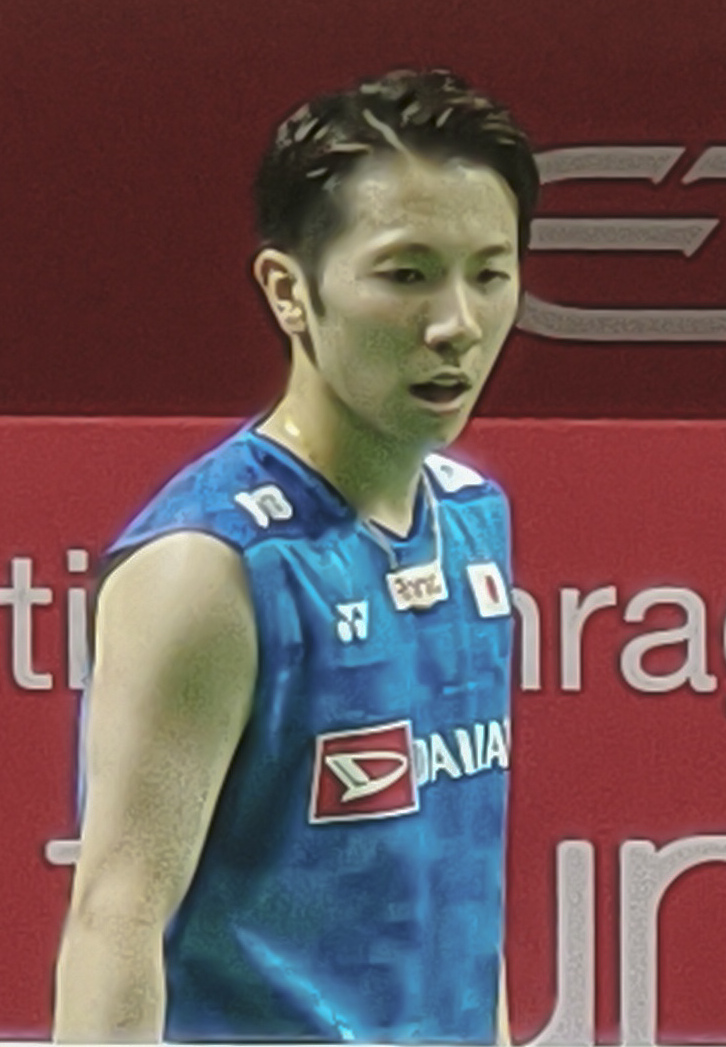
- Watanabe at the 2026 Indonesia Open

Personal information
- Born: 29 January 1999 (age 27) Koshigaya, Saitama, Japan
- Height: 1.66 m (5 ft 5 in)
- Weight: 65 kg (143 lb)

Sport
- Country: Japan
- Sport: Badminton
- Handedness: Right
- Coached by: Sho Sasaki

Men's singles
- Career record: 211 wins, 135 losses (60.98%)
- Highest ranking: 11 (22 October 2024)
- Current ranking: 15 (27 October 2026)
- BWF profile
Medal record
Men's badminton
Representing Japan
Sudirman Cup
| Bronze medal – third place | 2025 Xiamen | Mixed team |
Asian Games
| Bronze medal – third place | 2022 Hangzhou | Men's team |
Asia Team Championships
| Gold medal – first place | 2026 Qingdao | Men's team |
| Bronze medal – third place | 2020 Manila | Men's team |
| Bronze medal – third place | 2024 Selangor | Men's team |
World Junior Championships
| Bronze medal – third place | 2015 Lima | Boys' singles |
| Bronze medal – third place | 2016 Bilbao | Mixed team |
Asian Junior Championships
| Bronze medal – third place | 2015 Bangkok | Mixed team |
| Bronze medal – third place | 2016 Bangkok | Mixed team |

Koki Watanabe (渡邉 航貴, Watanabe Kōki; born 29 January 1999) is a Japanese badminton player. He graduated from the Saitama Sakae High School, and was part of the BIPROGY team since 2017. Watanabe won the Super 300 title at the 2023 Swiss Open and the Super 500 title at the 2024 Canada Open. He also finished runner-up at two Super 750 tournaments, the 2024 Denmark Open and the 2026 Japan Open.

In team competitions, Watanabe won a bronze medal with Japan in the men's team event at the 2022 Asian Games. He was also part of the Japanese squad that won the country's first men's team title at the 2026 Asia Team Championships.

== Early life and junior career ==
Watanabe started his badminton career when he was four years old, entering the badminton club under the influence of his sister. He later concentrated on badminton in kindergarten, and when he was in elementary school, he won the Saitama school championships for three consecutive years. Watanabe entered the Saitama Sakae Junior and Senior High School, and won the singles title at the national junior championships, also placing third in the doubles event.

He competed with the national junior team at the 2015 and 2016 Asia and World Junior Championships. In 2015, he won a bronze medal in boys' singles and helped the team secure a mixed team bronze at the Asian Championships; he contributed to two additional team bronze medals at the 2016 Asian and World Junior Championships.

== Career ==
=== 2018–2019 ===
In 2018, Watanabe reached his first World Tour final at the Super 100 Russian Open, finishing as the runner-up. Later that year, he won his first international title at the K & D Graphics International, defeating compatriot Kodai Naraoka in the final.

In 2019, Watanabe secured his maiden World Tour title at the Super 100 Orléans Masters, becoming the first Japanese player to win the tournament's men's singles title. He subsequently won the Osaka International defeating his schoolmate Takuma Obayashi in the final. Throughout the 2019 season, he advanced to the semi-finals of the Chinese Taipei Open and the Canada Open. At the end of the season, Watanabe was nominated for the Eddy Choong Most Promising Player of the Year award, which was won by An Se-young.

=== 2020–2022 ===
In 2020, Watanabe won a bronze medal with the Japanese men's team at the Asia Team Championships. After the international circuit resumed following the COVID-19 pandemic, he made his Super 1000 debut at the 2021 All England Open, where he lost in the first round to Viktor Axelsen. Later that year, he made his World Championships debut in Huelva, advancing to the second round. His best result of the 2022 season was a quarterfinal finish at the Australian Open.

=== 2023–2024 ===
In March, Watanabe won his first World Tour Super 300 title at the Swiss Open, becoming the first Japanese player to win the tournament's men's singles title. He defeated second seed Lee Zii Jia in the semi-finals and Chou Tien-chen in the final. In November, he reached his second final of the season at the Korea Masters, where he finished as the runner-up to compatriot Kento Momota.

Watanabe began 2024 by winning another men's team bronze medal at the Asia Team Championships. In July, he claimed his first Super 500 title at the Canada Open, defeating compatriot Kodai Naraoka the quarter-finals and Alex Lanier in the final. Later in the season, Watanabe advanced to his first Super 750 final at the Denmark Open, where he defeated Olympic silver medalist Kunlavut Vitidsarn before finishing as runner-up to Anders Antonsen.

His other results that season included semi-final appearances at the Arctic Open and the U.S. Open, as well as quarter-final finishes at the All England Open, China Open, and India Open. His notable victories during the season included a win over world number 3 Li Shifeng at the India Open and two wins against Olympic bronze medalist Lee Zii Jia at the China and Arctic Opens. Following these performances, Watanabe reached a career-high world ranking of 11 on 22 October.

=== 2025 ===
Watanabe experienced a challenging start to his 2025 season, suffering early-round exits in several tournaments, including the Super 1000 Malaysia Open and Indonesia Open. His form improved in July at the Super 750 Japan Open, where he reached the semifinals of the tournament for the first time. En route, he defeated Chou Tien-chen in the second round and Weng Hongyang in the quarter-finals. Watanabe credited advice from compatriot Kento Momota, which encouraged him to adopt a "challenger spirit" to overcome his slump. Later in the season, he reached the quarter-finals of the Arctic Open and French Open, although he was eliminated in the first round of both World Championships and China Open. In team competition, he won a bronze medal with Japanese team at the Sudirman Cup.

=== 2026 ===
Watanabe was part of the Japanese squad that won Japan's first men's team title at the Asia Team Championships in February. In March, he defeated third seed Anders Antonsen in the first round of the All England Open before losing in the quarter-finals to Victor Lai. He reached the second round of the Asian Championships in Ningbo the following month, defeating Zaki Ubaidillah before losing to Loh Kean Yew. In May, he reached the quarter-finals at the Thailand Open, where he defeated sixth seed Kodai Naraoka in the second round before losing to world No. 1 Shi Yuqi. Later that month, he reached the semi-finals of the Singapore Open. He defeated India's Lakshya Sen in the quarter-finals before losing to Loh Kean Yew.

Watanabe reached his second Super 750 final at the Japan Open in July, defeating Antonsen in the quarter-finals and Yushi Tanaka in the semi-finals before finishing as runner-up to Christo Popov. In October, he advanced to the semi-finals of the Arctic Open, defeating Chou Tien-chen in the quarter-finals before losing to Tanaka in three games. In November, he reached the final of the Super 500 Japan Masters, defeating Chou Tien-chen in the second round and Kunlavut Vitidsarn in the semi-finals before losing to Lakshya Sen.

== Awards and nominations ==
| Award | Year | Category | Result | Ref. |
|---|---|---|---|---|
| BWF Awards | 2019 | Eddy Choong Most Promising Player of the Year | Nominated | |

== Achievements ==
=== World Junior Championships ===
Boys' singles
| Year | Venue | Opponent | Score | Result | Ref. |
|---|---|---|---|---|---|
| 2015 | Centro de Alto Rendimiento de la Videna, Lima, Peru | (Chinese Taipei) Lu Chia-hung | 18–21, 12–21 | Bronze | |

=== BWF World Tour (3 titles, 5 runners-up) ===
The BWF World Tour, which was announced on 19 March 2017 and implemented in 2018, is a series of elite badminton tournaments sanctioned by the Badminton World Federation (BWF). The BWF World Tour is divided into levels of World Tour Finals, Super 1000, Super 750, Super 500, Super 300, and the BWF Tour Super 100.

Men's singles
| Year | Tournament | Level | Opponent | Score | Result | Ref. |
|---|---|---|---|---|---|---|
| 2018 | Russian Open | Super 100 | (India) Sourabh Verma | 21–18, 12–21, 17–21 | (silver) Runner-up | |
| 2019 | Orléans Masters | Super 100 | (France) Thomas Rouxel | 18–21, 21–12, 21–19 | (gold) Winner | |
| 2023 | Swiss Open | Super 300 | (Chinese Taipei) Chou Tien-chen | 22–20, 18–21, 21–12 | (gold) Winner | |
| 2023 | Korea Masters | Super 300 | (Japan) Kento Momota | 16–21, 15–21 | (silver) Runner-up | |
| 2024 | Canada Open | Super 500 | (France) Alex Lanier | 20–22, 21–17, 21–6 | (gold) Winner | |
| 2024 | Denmark Open | Super 750 | (Denmark) Anders Antonsen | 15–21, 16–21 | (silver) Runner-up | |
| 2026 | Japan Open | Super 750 | (France) Christo Popov | 11–21, 19–21 | (silver) Runner-up | |
| 2026 | Japan Masters | Super 500 | (India) Lakshya Sen | 21–13, 18–21, 14–21 | (silver) Runner-up | |

=== BWF International Challenge/Series (2 titles) ===
Men's singles
| Year | Tournament | Opponent | Score | Result | Ref. |
|---|---|---|---|---|---|
| 2018 | Yonex / K&D Graphics International | (Japan) Kodai Naraoka | 21–14, 14–21, 21–15 | (gold) Winner | |
| 2019 | Osaka International | (Japan) Takuma Obayashi | 19–21, 21–17, 21–7 | (gold) Winner | |

BWF International Challenge tournament

=== BWF Junior International (1 title, 1 runner-up) ===
Boys' singles
| Year | Tournament | Opponent | Score | Result | Ref. |
|---|---|---|---|---|---|
| 2015 | Danish Junior Cup | (Japan) Yuta Watanabe | 21–12, 18–21, 7–21 | (silver) Runner-up | |

Boys' doubles
| Year | Tournament | Partner | Opponent | Score | Result | Ref. |
|---|---|---|---|---|---|---|
| 2015 | Australian Junior International | (Japan) Kenya Mitsuhashi | (Philippines) Christian Bernardo (Philippines) Alvin Morada | 16–21, 21–17, 21–16 | (gold) Winner | |

BWF Junior International Series tournament
BWF Junior Future Series tournament

== Performance timeline ==
Key

| W | Won | F | Finalist | SF | Semi-finalist |
| QF | Quarter-finalist | #R | Rounds 4, 3, 2, 1 | RR | Round-robin stage |
| Q# | Qualification round | A | Absent | w/d | Withdrew |
| G | Gold | S | Silver | B | Bronze |
| NH | Not held | N/A | Not applicable | DNQ | Did not qualify |

=== National team ===
- Junior level

| Team events | 2015 | 2016 | Ref. |
|---|---|---|---|
| Asian Junior Championships | B | B | |
| World Junior Championships | 4th | B | |

- Senior level

| Team events | 2020 | 2021 | 2022 | 2023 | 2024 | 2025 | 2026 | Ref. |
|---|---|---|---|---|---|---|---|---|
| Asia Mixed Team Championships | NH | | | 6th | NH | A | NH | |
| Asia Team Championships | B | NH | A | NH | B | NH | G | |
| Asian Games | NH | | B | NH | | | 5th | |
| Sudirman Cup | NH | A | NH | A | NH | B | NH | |
| Thomas Cup | A | NH | A | NH | 5th | NH | 5th | |

=== Individual competitions ===
- Junior level

| Events | 2015 | 2016 | Ref. |
|---|---|---|---|
| Asian Junior Championships | A | 4R | |
| World Junior Championships | B | QF | |

- Senior level

| Event | 2021 | 2022 | 2023 | 2024 | 2025 | 2026 | Ref. |
|---|---|---|---|---|---|---|---|
| Asian Championships | NH | 2R | A | 1R | 1R | 2R | |
| World Championships | 2R | A | A | NH | 1R | A | |

| Tournament | SS / GP | | | BWF World Tour | | | | | | | | | Best | Ref. |
| Tournament | 2015 | 2016 | 2017 | 2018 | 2019 | 2020 | 2021 | 2022 | 2023 | 2024 | 2025 | 2026 | Best | Ref. |
|---|---|---|---|---|---|---|---|---|---|---|---|---|---|---|
| Malaysia Open | A | | | A | | NH | | A | | 2R | 2R | 2R | 2R ('24, '25, '26) | |
| India Open | A | | | A | | NH | | A | | QF | 1R | 1R | QF ('24) | |
| Indonesia Masters | A | | NH | A | | Q2 | 2R | A | Q1 | A | | 1R | 2R ('21) | |
| Thailand Masters | NH | A | 3R | A | 2R | 2R | NH | | 2R | A | | | 3R ('17) | |
| All England Open | A | | | A | | | 1R | A | | QF | A | QF | QF ('24, '26) | |
| Orléans Masters | N/A | | | A | W | NH | A | | 2R | A | | | W ('19) | |
| Swiss Open | A | | 2R | QF | Q2 | NH | A | 1R | W | 1R | A | QF | W ('23) | |
| Spain Masters | NH | | | A | | | | NH | QF | A | NH | | QF ('23) | |
| Thailand Open | A | | | A | | | NH | 2R | A | 2R | A | QF | QF ('26) | |
| Malaysia Masters | A | | | A | | 1R | NH | 1R | A | 1R | A | 1R | 1R ('20, '22, '24, '26) | |
| Singapore Open | A | | | A | | NH | | 2R | A | | 1R | SF | SF ('26) | |
| Indonesia Open | A | | | A | | NH | 1R | A | | | 1R | 2R | 2R ('26) | |
| Australian Open | A | | | 1R | Q1 | NH | | QF | A | | 1R | A | QF ('22) | |
| Macau Open | A | | 3R | 1R | A | NH | | | | A | | | 3R ('17) | |
| U.S. Open | A | | QF | A | 2R | NH | | | A | SF | A | | SF ('24) | |
| Canada Open | A | | QF | A | SF | NH | | A | QF | W | A | | W ('24) | |
| Japan Open | A | | Q2 | A | | NH | | A | QF | 1R | SF | F | F ('26) | |
| China Open | A | | | A | | NH | | | A | QF | 1R | 1R | QF ('24) | |
| Taipei Open | A | | | A | SF | NH | | 2R | A | | | | SF ('19) | |
| Korea Masters | A | 2R | A | A | QF | NH | | A | F | A | | | F ('23) | |
| China Masters | A | 1R | A | A | | NH | | | 1R | 1R | 1R | 1R | 1R ('16, '23, '24, '25, '26) | |
| Indonesia Masters Super 100 | NH | | | A | | NH | | 3R | 3R | A | | | 3R ('22, '23) | |
| Indonesia Masters Super 100 | NH | | | A | | NH | | 3R | A | | | | 3R ('22, '23) | |
| Vietnam Open | A | 3R | A | A | 3R | NH | | A | QF | A | | | QF ('23) | |
| Arctic Open | N/A | | | N/A | | NH | | | QF | SF | QF | SF | SF ('24, '26) | |
| Denmark Open | A | | | A | | | | | 2R | F | 1R | 2R | F ('24) | |
| French Open | A | | | A | | NH | A | | 1R | 1R | QF | 2R | QF ('25) | |
| Hylo Open | A | | | A | | | 1R | A | | | | | 1R ('21) | |
| Korea Open | A | | | A | | NH | | 1R | 2R | A | 2R | 1R | 2R ('23, '25) | |
| Japan Masters | NH | | | NH | | | | | QF | 2R | 1R | F | F ('26) | |
| Hong Kong Open | A | | | A | | NH | | | A | | 2R | 1R | 2R ('25) | |
| Akita Masters | NH | | | A | QF | NH | | | | | | | QF ('19) | |
| Chinese Taipei Masters | A | 2R | NH | NH | | | | | | | | | 2R ('16) | |
| New Zealand Open | A | | | 2R | Q1 | NH | | | | | | | 2R ('18) | |
| Russian Open | A | | | F | A | NH | | | | | | | F ('18) | |
| U.S. Grand Prix | 3R | N/A | | N/A | | | | | | | | | 3R ('15) | |
| Year-end ranking | 377 | 165 | 77 | 81 | 42 | 37 | 43 | 46 | 23 | 11 | 25 | | 11 | |
| Tournament | 2015 | 2016 | 2017 | 2018 | 2019 | 2020 | 2021 | 2022 | 2023 | 2024 | 2025 | 2026 | Best | Ref. |

== Wins over top-10 ranked players ==
Wins over players who were ranked in the world's top 10 at the time the match was played.

| # | Opponent | Rk | Tournament | Rd | Score | Rk | Ref. |
|---|---|---|---|---|---|---|---|
| 1 | (Malaysia) Lee Zii Jia | 4 | 2023 Swiss Open | SF | 21–11, 21–14 | 37 | |
| 2 | (Chinese Taipei) Chou Tien-chen | 6 | 2023 Swiss Open | F | 22–20, 18–21, 21–12 | 37 | |
| 3 | (China) Li Shifeng | 3 | 2024 India Open | 2R | 21–14, 13–21, 21–9 | 24 | |
| 4 | (Japan) Kodai Naraoka | 6 | 2024 Canada Open | QF | 21–18, 16–21, 21–11 | 18 | |
| 5 | (Malaysia) Lee Zii Jia | 3 | 2024 China Open | 1R | 21–15, 21–2 | 15 | |
| 6 | (Malaysia) Lee Zii Jia | 4 | 2024 Arctic Open | QF | 21–15, 13–21, 21–12 | 14 | |
| 7 | (Thailand) Kunlavut Vitidsarn | 6 | 2024 Denmark Open | 2R | 21–17, 21–19 | 13 | |
| 8 | (Chinese Taipei) Chou Tien-chen | 7 | 2025 Sudirman Cup | QF | 21–13, 20–22, 21–14 | 16 | |
| 9 | (Chinese Taipei) Chou Tien-chen | 6 | 2025 Japan Open | 2R | 16–21, 24–22, 21–17 | 18 | |
| 10 | (Denmark) Anders Antonsen | 3 | 2026 All England Open | 1R | 21–8, 21–12 | 24 | |
| 11 | (Japan) Kodai Naraoka | 9 | 2026 Thailand Open | 2R | 21–14, 14–21, 21–15 | 21 | |
| 12 | (Denmark) Anders Antonsen | 3 | 2026 Japan Open | QF | 21–13, 21–17 | 17 | |
| 13 | (Chinese Taipei) Chou Tien-chen | 3 | 2026 Arctic Open | QF | 21–19, 21–16 | 16 | |
| 14 | (Chinese Taipei) Chou Tien-chen | 5 | 2026 Japan Masters | 2R | 24–22, 21–19 | 15 | |
| 15 | (Thailand) Kunlavut Vitidsarn | 2 | 2026 Japan Masters | SF | 14–21, 21–11, 23–21 | 15 | |

== Record against selected opponents ==
Record against year-end Finals finalists, World Championships semi-finalists, and Olympic quarter-finalists. Accurate as of 15 November 2026.

| Player | M | W | L | Diff. |
|---|---|---|---|---|
| (Canada) Victor Lai | 2 | 0 | 2 | –2 |
| (China) Lin Dan | 1 | 0 | 1 | –1 |
| (China) Shi Yuqi | 3 | 0 | 3 | –3 |
| (China) Zhao Junpeng | 3 | 0 | 3 | –3 |
| (Chinese Taipei) Chou Tien-chen | 9 | 5 | 4 | +1 |
| (Denmark) Anders Antonsen | 7 | 2 | 5 | –3 |
| (Denmark) Viktor Axelsen | 4 | 0 | 4 | –4 |
| (Denmark) Hans-Kristian Vittinghus | 1 | 1 | 0 | +1 |
| (England) Rajiv Ouseph | 2 | 2 | 0 | +2 |
| (France) Alex Lanier | 5 | 2 | 3 | –1 |
| (France) Christo Popov | 5 | 1 | 4 | –3 |
| (Guatemala) Kevin Cordón | 1 | 1 | 0 | +1 |

| Player | M | W | L | Diff. |
|---|---|---|---|---|
| (India) Srikanth Kidambi | 4 | 1 | 3 | –2 |
| (India) Parupalli Kashyap | 2 | 2 | 0 | +2 |
| (India) Prannoy H. S. | 2 | 1 | 1 | 0 |
| (India) Lakshya Sen | 8 | 3 | 5 | –2 |
| (Japan) Kento Momota | 3 | 1 | 2 | –1 |
| (Japan) Kodai Naraoka | 7 | 3 | 4 | –1 |
| (Malaysia) Lee Zii Jia | 4 | 3 | 1 | +2 |
| (Malaysia) Liew Daren | 3 | 1 | 2 | –1 |
| (Singapore) Loh Kean Yew | 6 | 3 | 3 | 0 |
| (South Korea) Heo Kwang-hee | 4 | 2 | 2 | 0 |
| (Thailand) Kunlavut Vitidsarn | 8 | 3 | 5 | –2 |
| (Thailand) Kantaphon Wangcharoen | 2 | 2 | 0 | +2 |
