= 2024 Denmark Open =

Tournament details
- Dates: 15 – 20 October
- Edition: 73th
- Level: Super 750
- Total prize money: US$850,000
- Venue: Arena Fyn
- Location: Odense, Denmark

Champions
- Men's singles: (Denmark) Anders Antonsen
- Women's singles: (China) Wang Zhiyi
- Men's doubles: (China) Liang Weikeng (China) Wang Chang
- Women's doubles: (Japan) Rin Iwanaga (Japan) Kie Nakanishi
- Mixed doubles: (China) Feng Yanzhe (China) Huang Dongping
- Official website: denmarkopen.dk

The 2024 Denmark Open (officially known as the Victor Denmark Open 2024 for sponsorship reasons) was a badminton tournament which took place at the Arena Fyn in Odense, Denmark, from 15 to 20 October 2024 and had a total prize of US$850,000.

== Tournament ==
The 2024 Denmark Open was the thirtieth tournament according to the 2024 BWF World Tour. It was a part of the Denmark Open, which had been held since 1936. This tournament was organized by Badminton Denmark with sanction from the BWF

=== Venue ===
This tournament was held at the Arena Fyn in Odense, Denmark.

=== Point distribution ===
Below is the point distribution table for each phase of the tournament based on the BWF points system for the BWF World Tour Super 750 event.

Winner	Runner-up	3/4	5/8	9/16	17/32
11,000	9,350	7,700	6,050	4,320	2,660

=== Prize money ===
The total prize money for this tournament was US$850,000. Distribution of prize money was in accordance with BWF regulations.

Event	Winner	Finals	Semi-finals	Quarter-finals	Last 16	Last 32
Singles	$59,500	$28,900	$11,900	$4,675	$2,550	$850
Doubles	$62,900	$29,750	$11,900	$5,312.5	$2,762.5	$850

== Men's singles ==
=== Seeds ===
1. (Denmark) Viktor Axelsen (second round)
2. (Denmark) Anders Antonsen (champion)
3. (Malaysia) Lee Zii Jia (withdrew)
4. (Indonesia) Jonatan Christie (second round)
5. (Japan) Kodai Naraoka (first round)
6. (Thailand) Kunlavut Vitidsarn (second round)
7. (China) Li Shifeng (quarter-finals)
8. (Indonesia) Anthony Sinisuka Ginting (first round)

=== Finals ===
Semi-finals
(France) Alex Lanier	16	13
(Japan) Koki Watanabe	21	21
(Japan) Kenta Nishimoto	15	14
2	(Denmark) Anders Antonsen	21	21

Final
(Japan) Koki Watanabe	15	16
2	(Denmark) Anders Antonsen	21	21

=== Top half ===
==== Section 1 ====
First round
1	(Denmark) V Axelsen	21	21
(Japan) Y Tanaka	13	13
(Hong Kong) Ng K L	17	18
(France) A Lanier	21	21
5	(Japan) K Naraoka	17	20
(Singapore) Loh K Y	21	22
(Hong Kong) Lee C Y	22	21	21
(China) Lei LX	20	23	10

Second round
1	(Denmark) V Axelsen	19	7^{r}
(France) A Lanier	21	11
(Singapore) Loh K Y	9	21	21
(Hong Kong) Lee C Y	21	16	14

Quarter-finals
(France) A Lanier	21	15	24
(Singapore) Loh K Y	18	21	22

==== Section 2 ====
First round
4	(Indonesia) J Christie	21	21
(Malaysia) Leong J H	16	14
(China) Lu GZ	12	21	21
(India) L Sen	21	19	14
6	(Thailand) K Vitidsarn	21	21
PFR	(Denmark) M Christophersen	18	6
(Japan) K Watanabe	21	21
(Chinese Taipei) Lee C-h	15	15

Second round
4	(Indonesia) J Christie	19	21	18
(China) Lu GZ	21	8	21
6	(Thailand) K Vitidsarn	13	19
(Japan) K Watanabe	21	21

Quarter-finals
(China) Lu GZ	15	0^{r}
(Japan) K Watanabe	21	0

=== Bottom half ===
==== Section 3 ====
First round
(China) Weng HY	21	21
(South Korea) Jeon H-j	10	17
(Chinese Taipei) Wang T-w	18	12
SWM	(Chinese Taipei) Chou T-c	21	21
(Canada) B Yang	15	11
(Denmark) R Gemke	21	21
(Japan) K Nishimoto	21	15	22
8	(Indonesia) A S Ginting	12	21	20

Second round
(China) Weng HY	21	14	21
SWM	(Chinese Taipei) Chou T-c	19	21	15
(Denmark) R Gemke	21	15	13
(Japan) K Nishimoto	18	21	21

Quarter-finals
(China) Weng HY	17	21	18
(Japan) K Nishimoto	21	15	21

==== Section 4 ====
First round
(Chinese Taipei) Su L-y	21	17	22
PFR	(India) S K Karunakaran	15	21	20
(France) C Popov	15	19
7	(China) Li SF	21	21
(Republic of Ireland) N Nguyen	14	21	19
(Japan) T Obayashi	21	12	21
(France) T J Popov	21	11	14
2	(Denmark) A Antonsen	14	21	21

Second round
(Chinese Taipei) Su L-y	14	16
7	(China) Li SF	21	21
(Japan) T Obayashi	26	17	15
2	(Denmark) A Antonsen	24	21	21

Quarter-finals
7	(China) Li SF	21	8	20
2	(Denmark) A Antonsen	12	21	22

== Women's singles ==
=== Seeds ===
1. (South Korea) An Se-young (final)
2. (China) Wang Zhiyi (champion)
3. (Japan) Akane Yamaguchi (first round)
4. (China) Han Yue (second round)
5. (Indonesia) Gregoria Mariska Tunjung (semi-finals)
6. (Japan) Aya Ohori (first round)
7. (Thailand) Supanida Katethong (quarter-finals)
8. (Thailand) Busanan Ongbamrungphan (first round)

=== Finals ===
Semi-finals
1	(South Korea) An Se-young	22	12
5	(Indonesia) Gregoria Mariska Tunjung	20	12^{r}
(Indonesia) Putri Kusuma Wardani	20	14
2	(China) Wang Zhiyi	22	21

Final
1	(South Korea) An Se-young	10	12
2	(China) Wang Zhiyi	21	21

=== Top half ===
==== Section 1 ====
First round
1	(South Korea) An S-y	21	21
(Thailand) P Choeikeewong	16	8
(Thailand) R Intanon	21	21
(Germany) Y Li	12	6
7	(Thailand) S Katethong	21	21
(India) A Kashyap	13	12
(India) M Bansod	13	12
(Vietnam) Nguyễn T L	21	21

Second round
1	(South Korea) An S-y	17	21	21
(Thailand) R Intanon	21	18	14
7	(Thailand) S Katethong	21	21
(Vietnam) Nguyễn T L	14	18

Quarter-finals
1	(South Korea) An S-y	12	21	21
7	(Thailand) S Katethong	21	10	12

==== Section 2 ====
First round
4	(China) Han Y	27	21	21
(Thailand) P Chochuwong	29	15	12
(India) P. V. Sindhu	21	13
(Chinese Taipei) Pai Y-p	8	7^{r}
5	(Indonesia) G M Tunjung	21	18	21
(Denmark) L Kjærsfeldt	18	21	11
(Denmark) M Blichfeldt	21	21
(Denmark) J D Jakobsen	15	18

Second round
4	(China) Han Y	21	12	16
(India) P. V. Sindhu	18	21	21
5	(Indonesia) G M Tunjung	21	22
(Denmark) M Blichfeldt	10	20

Quarter-finals
(India) P. V. Sindhu	13	21	9
5	(Indonesia) G M Tunjung	21	16	21

=== Bottom half ===
==== Section 3 ====
First round
(Scotland) K Gilmour	19	21	18
(Chinese Taipei) Sung S-y	21	14	21
(Indonesia) P K Wardani	21	21
6	(Japan) A Ohori	19	18
(Japan) T Miyazaki	21	21
(Japan) N Nidaira	13	17
(Singapore) Yeo J M	21	10	21
3	(Japan) A Yamaguchi	10	21	17

Second round
(Chinese Taipei) Sung S-y	11	15
(Indonesia) P K Wardani	21	21
(Japan) T Miyazaki	15	16
(Singapore) Yeo J M	21	21

Quarter-finals
(Indonesia) P K Wardani	20	21	21
(Singapore) Yeo J M	22	11	18

==== Section 4 ====
First round
(India) U Hooda	15	21	18
(United States) L Lam	21	13	21
(Canada) M Li	21	21
8	(Thailand) B Ongbamrungphan	17	14
(Denmark) L Christophersen	18	21	17
(South Korea) Kim G-e	21	18	21
(China) Zhang YM	17	10
2	(China) Wang ZY	21	21

Second round
(United States) L Lam	7	11
(Canada) M Li	21	21
(South Korea) Kim G-e	10	6^{r}
2	(China) Wang ZY	21	13

Quarter-finals
(Canada) M Li	17	11
2	(China) Wang ZY	21	21

== Men's doubles ==
=== Seeds ===
1. (China) Liang Weikeng / Wang Chang (champions)
2. (Denmark) Kim Astrup / Anders Skaarup Rasmussen (final)
3. (South Korea) Kang Min-hyuk / Seo Seung-jae (withdrew)
4. (Malaysia) Aaron Chia / Soh Wooi Yik (quarter-finals)
5. (China) He Jiting / Ren Xiangyu (first round)
6. (Indonesia) Fajar Alfian / Muhammad Rian Ardianto (semi-finals)
7. (Malaysia) Goh Sze Fei / Nur Izzuddin (first round)
8. (Japan) Takuro Hoki / Yugo Kobayashi (quarter-finals)

=== Finals ===
Semi-finals
1	(China) Liang Weikeng (China) Wang Chang	21	21
(China) Chen Boyang (China) Liu Yi	17	14
6	(Indonesia) Fajar Alfian (Indonesia) Muhammad Rian Ardianto	20	21	11
2	(Denmark) Kim Astrup (Denmark) Anders Skaarup Rasmussen	22	18	21

Final
1	(China) Liang Weikeng (China) Wang Chang	21	21
2	(Denmark) Kim Astrup (Denmark) Anders Skaarup Rasmussen	18	17

=== Top half ===
==== Section 1 ====
First round
1	(China) Liang WK (China) Wang C	21	18	21
(Chinese Taipei) Lin B-w (Chinese Taipei) Su C-h	18	21	13
(Scotland) C Grimley (Scotland) M Grimley	20	19
(Indonesia) L R Carnando (Indonesia) B Maulana	22	21
7	(Malaysia) Goh S F (Malaysia) N Izzuddin	13	13
PFR	(Thailand) K Kedren (Thailand) D Puavaranukroh	21	21
(Denmark) R Kjær (Denmark) F Søgaard	21	21
(Germany) D Hess (Germany) M Seidel	11	14

Second round
1	(China) Liang WK (China) Wang C	21	21
(Indonesia) L R Carnando (Indonesia) B Maulana	17	18
PFR	(Thailand) K Kedren (Thailand) D Puavaranukroh	21	10	21
(Denmark) R Kjær (Denmark) F Søgaard	18	21	15

Quarter-finals
1	(China) Liang WK (China) Wang C	21	18	21
PFR	(Thailand) K Kedren (Thailand) D Puavaranukroh	15	21	12

==== Section 2 ====
First round
4	(Malaysia) A Chia (Malaysia) Soh W Y	28	21
(Japan) K Mitsuhashi (Japan) H Okamura	26	11
(Malaysia) Man W C (Malaysia) Tee K W	21	21
(England) C Hemming (England) Et van Leeuwen	11	10
5	(China) He JT (China) Ren XY	18	24	19
(China) Chen BY (China) Liu Y	21	22	21
(Denmark) A Søndergaard (Denmark) J Toft	21	21	16
(Denmark) R Espersen (Denmark) C F Kjær	16	23	21

Second round
4	(Malaysia) A Chia (Malaysia) Soh W Y	21	21	21
(Malaysia) Man W C (Malaysia) Tee K W	23	17	16
(China) Chen BY (China) Liu Y	21	14	21
(Denmark) R Espersen (Denmark) C F Kjær	18	21	16

Quarter-finals
4	(Malaysia) A Chia (Malaysia) Soh W Y	20	15
(China) Chen BY (China) Liu Y	22	21

=== Bottom half ===
==== Section 3 ====
First round
(Malaysia) Ong Y S (Malaysia) Teo E Y	18	8
(England) B Lane (England) S Vendy	21	21
(Denmark) D Lundgaard (Denmark) M Vestergaard	17	21
SWM	(Chinese Taipei) Lee J-h (Chinese Taipei) Yang P-hs	21	23
(Chinese Taipei) Lee F-c (Chinese Taipei) Lee F-j	21	24
(China) Xie HN (China) Zeng WH	15	22
(Germany) B Geiss (Germany) J C Völker	12	18
6	(Indonesia) F Alfian (Indonesia) M R Ardianto	21	21

Second round
(England) B Lane (England) S Vendy	21	14	23
SWM	(Chinese Taipei) Lee J-h (Chinese Taipei) Yang P-hs	16	21	21
(Chinese Taipei) Lee F-c (Chinese Taipei) Lee F-j	16	21	18
6	(Indonesia) F Alfian (Indonesia) M R Ardianto	21	18	21

Quarter-finals
(England) B Lane (England) S Vendy	15	19
6	(Indonesia) F Alfian (Indonesia) M R Ardianto	21	21

==== Section 4 ====
First round
(Chinese Taipei) Lu M-c (Chinese Taipei) Tang K-w	22	15
(Chinese Taipei) Liu K-h (Chinese Taipei) Yang P-ha	22	21
(Indonesia) M Ahsan (Indonesia) H Setiawan	8	15
8	(Japan) T Hoki (Japan) Y Kobayashi	21	21
(Canada) K Lee (Canada) T A Lindeman	16	11
(Malaysia) J Arif (Malaysia) Yap R K	21	21
(France) C Popov (France) T J Popov	8	12
2	(Denmark) K Astrup (Denmark) A S Rasmussen	21	21

Second round
(Chinese Taipei) Liu K-h (Chinese Taipei) Yang P-ha	22	15
8	(Japan) T Hoki (Japan) Y Kobayashi	24	21
(Malaysia) J Arif (Malaysia) Yap R K	14	7
2	(Denmark) K Astrup (Denmark) A S Rasmussen	21	21

Quarter-finals
8	(Japan) T Hoki (Japan) Y Kobayashi	21	14	18
2	(Denmark) K Astrup (Denmark) A S Rasmussen	13	21	21

== Women's doubles ==
=== Seeds ===
1. (China) Liu Shengshu / Tan Ning (final)
2. (South Korea) Baek Ha-na / Lee So-hee (semi-finals)
3. (Japan) Nami Matsuyama / Chiharu Shida (semi-finals)
4. (Japan) Rin Iwanaga / Kie Nakanishi (champions)
5. (Malaysia) Pearly Tan / Thinaah Muralitharan (quarter-finals)
6. (South Korea) Jeong Na-eun / Kim Hye-jeong (quarter-finals)
7. (South Korea) Kim So-yeong / Kong Hee-yong (second round)
8. (China) Li Yijing / Luo Xumin (quarter-finals)

=== Finals ===
Semi-finals
1	(China) Liu Shengshu (China) Tan Ning	21	21
3	(Japan) Nami Matsuyama (Japan) Chiharu Shida	14	16
4	(Japan) Rin Iwanaga (Japan) Kie Nakanishi	17	24	21
2	(South Korea) Baek Ha-na (South Korea) Lee So-hee	21	22	17

Final
1	(China) Liu Shengshu (China) Tan Ning	18	14
4	(Japan) Rin Iwanaga (Japan) Kie Nakanishi	21	21

=== Top half ===
==== Section 1 ====
First round
(Denmark) J Finne-Ipsen (Denmark) M Surrow	21	21
(Thailand) B Aimsaard (Thailand) N Aimsaard	10	15
(Japan) K Ishikawa (Japan) M Konegawa	12	16
(China) Jia YF (China) Li WM	21	21

Second round
1	(China) Liu SS (China) Tan N	21	21
(Denmark) J Finne-Ipsen (Denmark) M Surrow	12	16
7	(South Korea) Kim S-y (South Korea) Kong H-y	16	14
(China) Jia YF (China) Li WM	21	21

Quarter-finals
1	(China) Liu SS (China) Tan N	21	22
(China) Jia YF (China) Li WM	9	20

==== Section 2 ====
First round
(Denmark) A C Kudsk (Denmark) S Schulz	18	15
(Denmark) M Fruergaard (Denmark) S Thygesen	21	21
8	(China) Li YJ (China) Luo XM	21	21
(England) C Birch (England) Es van Leeuwen	14	10
(India) R Panda (India) S Panda	18	22
(Chinese Taipei) Chang C-h (Chinese Taipei) Yang C-t	21	24

Second round
3	(Japan) N Matsuyama (Japan) C Shida	21	21
(Denmark) M Fruergaard (Denmark) S Thygesen	14	18
8	(China) Li YJ (China) Luo XM	21	21
(Chinese Taipei) Chang C-h (Chinese Taipei) Yang C-t	15	15

Quarter-finals
3	(Japan) N Matsuyama (Japan) C Shida	21	22
8	(China) Li YJ (China) Luo XM	17	20

=== Bottom half ===
==== Section 3 ====
First round
(South Korea) Lee Y-l (South Korea) Shin S-c	17	21	21
(Scotland) J MacPherson (Scotland) C Torrance	21	18	16
(India) T Jolly (India) G Gopichand	21	17	15
5	(Malaysia) P Tan (Malaysia) Thinaah M	19	21	21
(Sweden) M Sjöö (Sweden) T Sjöö	13	16
(Chinese Taipei) Sung S-y (Chinese Taipei) Yu C-h	21	21

Second round
(South Korea) Lee Y-l (South Korea) Shin S-c	22	18	16
5	(Malaysia) P Tan (Malaysia) Thinaah M	20	21	21
(Chinese Taipei) Sung S-y (Chinese Taipei) Yu C-h	8	12
4	(Japan) R Iwanaga (Japan) K Nakanishi	21	21

Quarter-finals
5	(Malaysia) P Tan (Malaysia) Thinaah M	20	19
4	(Japan) R Iwanaga (Japan) K Nakanishi	22	21

==== Section 4 ====
First round
(Thailand) O Jongsathapornparn (Thailand) S Suwachai	14	21	21
(Spain) P Lopez (Spain) L Rodriguez	21	14	18
(Ukraine) P Buhrova (Ukraine) Y Kantemyr	21	21
(Netherlands) K de Wit (Ukraine) M Stoliarenko	13	15

Second round
(Thailand) O Jongsathapornparn (Thailand) S Suwachai	15	17
6	(South Korea) Jeong N-e (South Korea) Kim H-j	21	21
(Ukraine) P Buhrova (Ukraine) Y Kantemyr	11	8
2	(South Korea) Baek H-n (South Korea) Lee S-h	21	21

Quarter-finals
6	(South Korea) Jeong N-e (South Korea) Kim H-j	17	9
2	(South Korea) Baek H-n (South Korea) Lee S-h	21	21

== Mixed doubles ==
=== Seeds ===
1. (China) Feng Yanzhe / Huang Dongping (champions)
2. (China) Jiang Zhenbang / Wei Yaxin (final)
3. (South Korea) Kim Won-ho / Jeong Na-eun (semi-finals)
4. (Hong Kong) Tang Chun Man / Tse Ying Suet (semi-finals)
5. (Malaysia) Goh Soon Huat / Shevon Jemie Lai (first round)
6. (Denmark) Jesper Toft / Amalie Magelund (quarter-finals)
7. (China) Cheng Xing / Zhang Chi (first round)
8. (Chinese Taipei) Yang Po-hsuan / Hu Ling-fang (quarter-finals)

=== Finals ===
Semi-finals
1	(China) Feng Yanzhe (China) Huang Dongping	21	21	21
4	(Hong Kong) Tang Chun Man (Hong Kong) Tse Ying Suet	23	19	19
3	(South Korea) Kim Won-ho (South Korea) Jeong Na-eun	17	9
2	(China) Jiang Zhenbang (China) Wei Yaxin	21	21

Final
1	(China) Feng Yanzhe (China) Huang Dongping	15	21	21
2	(China) Jiang Zhenbang (China) Wei Yaxin	21	18	17

=== Top half ===
==== Section 1 ====
First round
1	(China) Feng YZ (China) Huang DP	21	21
(Denmark) M Vestergaard (Denmark) C Busch	14	12
(Denmark) R Espersen (Denmark) A C Kudsk	21	21
(England) C Hemming (England) Es van Leeuwen	17	9
5	(Malaysia) Goh S H (Malaysia) S J Lai	21	22	10
(France) T Gicquel (France) D Delrue	9	24	21
(Germany) J R Jansen (Germany) T P Nguyen	11	14
(Netherlands) R Tabeling (Denmark) A Bøje	21	21

Second round
1	(China) Feng YZ (China) Huang DP	21	21
(Denmark) R Espersen (Denmark) A C Kudsk	9	7
(France) T Gicquel (France) D Delrue	21	21
(Netherlands) R Tabeling (Denmark) A Bøje	16	16

Quarter-finals
1	(China) Feng YZ (China) Huang DP	21	21
(France) T Gicquel (France) D Delrue	11	16

==== Section 2 ====
First round
4	(Hong Kong) Tang C M (Hong Kong) Tse Y S	21	21
(England) G Mairs (England) J Mairs	18	10
(Indonesia) R N Kusharjanto (Indonesia) L A Kusumawati	21	21
(India) S K Karunakaran (India) A Variyath	19	15
6	(Denmark) J Toft (Denmark) A Magelund	21	13	21
(Thailand) D Puavaranukroh (Thailand) S Paewsampran	19	21	12
(Spain) R Garcia (Spain) L Rodríguez	21	21
(Ukraine) O Titov (Ukraine) Y Kantemyr	16	13

Second round
4	(Hong Kong) Tang C M (Hong Kong) Tse Y S	16	21	21
(Indonesia) R N Kusharjanto (Indonesia) L A Kusumawati	21	18	16
6	(Denmark) J Toft (Denmark) A Magelund	21	19	21
(Spain) R Garcia (Spain) L Rodríguez	15	21	11

Quarter-finals
4	(Hong Kong) Tang C M (Hong Kong) Tse Y S	21	21
6	(Denmark) J Toft (Denmark) A Magelund	18	13

=== Bottom half ===
==== Section 3 ====
First round
PFR	(Scotland) A Dunn (Scotland) J MacPherson	17	12
(Denmark) M Thyrri (Denmark) M Surrow	21	21
(Thailand) S Jomkoh (Thailand) S Taerattanachai	10	15
8	(Chinese Taipei) Yang P-h (Chinese Taipei) Hu L-f	21	21
(Malaysia) Tan K M (Malaysia) Lai P J	21	21
(England) Et van Leeuwen (England) C Birch	7	14
(Thailand) R Oupthong (Thailand) J Sudjaipraparat	21	16	15
3	(South Korea) Kim W-h (South Korea) Jeong N-e	18	21	21

Second round
(Denmark) M Thyrri (Denmark) M Surrow	12	18
8	(Chinese Taipei) Yang P-h (Chinese Taipei) Hu L-f	21	21
(Malaysia) Tan K M (Malaysia) Lai P J	21	18	16
3	(South Korea) Kim W-h (South Korea) Jeong N-e	16	21	21

Quarter-finals
8	(Chinese Taipei) Yang P-h (Chinese Taipei) Hu L-f	23	14
3	(South Korea) Kim W-h (South Korea) Jeong N-e	25	21

==== Section 4 ====
First round
(India) B S Reddy (India) N S Reddy	22	19	22
(Canada) K Lee (Canada) E Zhang	20	21	24
(Indonesia) R Rivaldy (Indonesia) P H Mentari	21	21
7	(China) Cheng X (China) Zhang C	15	9
(Japan) Y Watanabe (Japan) M Taguchi	14	17
(Malaysia) Hoo P R (Malaysia) Cheng S Y	21	21
(China) Guo XW (China) Chen FH	14	9
2	(China) Jiang ZB (China) Wei YX	21	21

Second round
(Canada) K Lee (Canada) E Zhang
(Indonesia) R Rivaldy (Indonesia) P H Mentari	w	/	o
(Malaysia) Hoo P R (Malaysia) Cheng S Y	8	23	14
2	(China) Jiang ZB (China) Wei YX	21	21	21

Quarter-finals
(Indonesia) R Rivaldy (Indonesia) P H Mentari	11	21	19
2	(China) Jiang ZB (China) Wei YX	21	17	21

Preceded by 2024 Arctic Open	BWF World Tour; 2024 BWF season	Succeeded by 2024 Hylo Open; 2024 Indonesia Masters Super 100 II
