= 2019 BWF World Junior Championships – Boys' singles =

2019 BWF World Junior Championships Boys' Singles
Tournament details
- Dates: 7 – 13 October 2019
- Edition: 21st
- Level: International
- Venue: Kazan Gymnastics Center
- Location: Kazan, Russia

The boys' singles of the tournament 2019 BWF World Junior Championships was held from 7 to 13 October 2019. The defending champions is Kunlavut Vitidsarn from Thailand.

== Seeds ==
Click on the seed number of a player to go to their draw section.

1. (Thailand) Kunlavut Vitidsarn (champion)
2. (Canada) Brian Yang (fourth round)
3. (China) Liu Liang (fifth round)
4. (China) Li Yunze (semifinals)
5. (Indonesia) Syabda Perkasa Belawa (third round)
6. (Indonesia) Bobby Setiabudi (quarterfinals)
7. (India) Meiraba Maisnam (third round)
8. (Indonesia) Christian Adinata (fourth round)

9. (Russia) Georgii Karpov (second round)
10. (France) Christo Popov (final)
11. (Spain) Tomas Toledano (third round)
12. (Malaysia) Kok Jing Hong (fourth round)
13. (Indonesia) Yonathan Ramlie (semifinals)
14. (Spain) Ernesto Baschwitz (second round)
15. (Croatia) Luka Ban (second round)
16. (Thailand) Setthanan Piyawatcharavijit (fifth round)

== Draw ==
=== Finals ===
Fifth Round
1	(Thailand) Kunlavut Vitidsarn	21	21
(Chinese Taipei) Liao Jhuo-fu	16	14
6	(Indonesia) Bobby Setiabudi	21	21	21
(China) Dong Tianyao	23	18	10
3	(China) Liu Liang	21	19	20
13	(Indonesia) Yonathan Ramlie	14	21	22
(Chinese Taipei) Su Li-yang	21	16	14
(Malaysia) Shahyar Shaqeem	13	21	21
(Malaysia) Wyman Goh	9	21	21
(Hong Kong) Jason Gunawan	21	19	16
16	(Thailand) Setthanan Piyawatcharavijit	14	21	17
4	(China) Li Yunze	21	19	21
10	(France) Christo Popov	21	22
(Chinese Taipei) Lin Kuan-ting	11	20
(India) Rohan Gurbani	15	13
(China) Ren Chengming	21	21

Quarterfinals
1	(Thailand) Kunlavut Vitidsarn	17	21	21
6	(Indonesia) Bobby Setiabudi	21	16	14
13	(Indonesia) Yonathan Ramlie	21	17	21
(Malaysia) Shahyar Shaqeem	16	21	19
(Malaysia) Wyman Goh
4	(China) Li Yunze	w	/	o
10	(France) Christo Popov	16	21	21
(China) Ren Chengming	21	10	13

Semifinals
1	(Thailand) Kunlavut Vitidsarn	21	21
13	(Indonesia) Yonathan Ramlie	11	10
4	(China) Li Yunze	18	13
10	(France) Christo Popov	21	21

Final
1	(Thailand) Kunlavut Vitidsarn	21	21
10	(France) Christo Popov	8	11

=== Top half ===
==== Section 1 ====
First Round

Second Round
1	(Thailand) K Vitidsarn	21	21
(Denmark) M Johannesen	9	12
(France) Y Gaudin	21	20	21
(Sweden) L P Olsson	14	22	15
(Norway) D Gataullin	7	8
(New Zealand) E Lau	21	21
(Sri Lanka) L de Silva	21	21
(Uzbekistan) A Muminov	10	14

Third Round
1	(Thailand) K Vitidsarn	21	21
(France) Y Gaudin	12	12
(New Zealand) E Lau	21	21
(Sri Lanka) L de Silva	15	11

Fourth Round
1	(Thailand) K Vitidsarn	21	21
(New Zealand) E Lau	12	7

==== Section 2 ====
First Round

Second Round
12	(Malaysia) Kok J H	21	21
(Singapore) B Lee	10	11
(Armenia) A Vardanyan	10	6
(India) P R Gandham	21	21
(Australia) R Tang	16	17
(Chinese Taipei) Liao J-f	21	21
(Finland) S Emran	18	17
(Hungary) K Toth	21	21

Third Round
12	(Malaysia) Kok J H	21	21
(India) P R Gandham	16	13
(Chinese Taipei) Liao J-f	21	21
(Hungary) K Toth	12	8

Fourth Round
12	(Malaysia) Kok J H	21	18	16
(Chinese Taipei) Liao J-f	16	21	21

==== Section 3 ====
First Round

Second Round
6	(Indonesia) B Setiabudi	21	21
(French Polynesia) T Politi	4	4
(Switzerland) Y Orteu	21	21
(Latvia) K Vārna	10	8
(United States) K Kalyanasundaram	17	21	15
(Portugal) H Fernandes	21	14	21
(Macau) Pui C C	9	8
(South Korea) Kim T-r	21	21

Third Round
6	(Indonesia) B Setiabudi	21	21
(Switzerland) Y Orteu	6	11
(Portugal) H Fernandes	7	3
(South Korea) Kim T-r	21	21

Fourth Round
6	(Indonesia) B Setiabudi	21	15	21
(South Korea) Kim T-r	17	21	13

==== Section 4 ====
First Round

Second Round
9	(Russia) G Karpov	22	20	13
(China) Dong TY	20	22	21
(Uganda) A M Vaheed	6	8
(Japan) S Inamitsu	21	21
(Iceland) G Nilsson	7	16
(Spain) A Leal	21	21
(Belarus) H Shvydkou	11	14
(Canada) Chen YZ	21	21

Third Round
(China) Dong TY	21	25
(Japan) S Inamitsu	10	23
(Spain) A Leal	23	21
(Canada) Chen YZ	21	6

Fourth Round
(China) Dong TY	21	21
(Spain) A Leal	11	14

==== Section 5 ====
First Round

Second Round
3	(China) Liu L	22	21
(Germany) M Kicklitz	20	12
(Iceland) B M Ellertsson	5	6
(France) A Lanier	21	21
(Mongolia) Y-E Munkhbaatar	6	12
(Uzbekistan) A Sultanov	21	21
(Portugal) D Gloria	21	21
(United States) J Yang	15	15

Third Round
3	(China) Liu L	21	21
(France) A Lanier	6	11
(Uzbekistan) A Sultanov	21	15	15
(Portugal) D Gloria	19	21	21

Fourth Round
3	(China) Liu L	21	21
(Portugal) D Gloria	11	8

==== Section 6 ====
First Round

Second Round
13	(Indonesia) Y Ramlie	21	21
(Hong Kong) Ko S H	13	10
(Belarus) I Larushyn	12	7
(England) H Huang	21	21
(Italy) E Baroni	21	19	21
(Sri Lanka) C Illeperumachchi	16	21	16
(Lithuania) J Petkus	21	22
(Finland) T Lindelöf	15	20

Third Round
13	(Indonesia) Y Ramlie	21	21
(England) H Huang	12	12
(Italy) E Baroni	21	21
(Lithuania) J Petkus	7	12

Fourth Round
13	(Indonesia) Y Ramlie	18	21	21
(Italy) E Baroni	21	8	13

==== Section 7 ====
First Round

Second Round
7	(India) M Maisnam	21	21
(Romania) T I Cioroboiu	4	3
(Scotland) M McGuire	13	4
(Chinese Taipei) Su L-y	21	21
(Canada) A Bianchini	17	25	21
(Australia) R Agustino	21	23	16
(Macau) Ao F L	16	12
(Japan) H Uchino	21	21

Third Round
7	(India) M Maisnam	16	11
(Chinese Taipei) Su L-y	21	21
(Canada) A Bianchini	19	15
(Japan) H Uchino	21	21

Fourth Round
(Chinese Taipei) Su L-y	21	21
(Japan) H Uchino	13	9

==== Section 8 ====
First Round
(Malaysia) S Shaqeem	21	21
(Norway) J Østhassel	4	5

Second Round
14	(Spain) E Baschwitz	15	14
(Singapore) N Yap	21	21
(Kazakhstan) D Abdullayev	15	8
(Estonia) H-K Pilve	21	21
(Slovakia) J Horak	21	17	19
(South Korea) An Y-s	16	21	21
(Greece) V R Kiosses	8	8
(Malaysia) S Shaqeem	21	21

Third Round
(Singapore) N Yap	21	24
(Estonia) H-K Pilve	15	22
(South Korea) An Y-s	15	6
(Malaysia) S Shaqeem	21	21

Fourth Round
(Singapore) N Yap	11	26	18
(Malaysia) S Shaqeem	21	24	21

=== Bottom half ===
==== Section 9 ====
First Round
(South Korea) Lee Y-j	15	21	21
(Russia) I Kim	21	10	15

Second Round
(South Korea) Lee Y-j	21	21
(Kazakhstan) A Shalagin	6	3
(Malaysia) W Goh	21	17	21
(Netherlands) F Achthoven	12	21	10
(Lithuania) D Berzanskis	21	10	11
(Switzerland) A Boudier	18	21	21
(Chinese Taipei) Yu S-p	21	21
15	(Croatia) L Ban	13	19

Third Round
(South Korea) Lee Y-j	14	13
(Malaysia) W Goh	21	21
(Switzerland) A Boudier	8	11
(Chinese Taipei) Yu S-p	21	21

Fourth Round
(Malaysia) W Goh	21	19	21
(Chinese Taipei) Yu S-p	15	21	19

==== Section 10 ====
First Round

Second Round
(India) S Karunakaran	21	21
(Uganda) S Wasswa	6	5
(Portugal) J Chang	11	15
(Germany) Oei K-y	21	21
(Hong Kong) J Gunawan	21	21
(Iceland) A Broddason	8	4
(Macau) Lee R H	15	11
5	(Indonesia) S P Belawa	21	21

Third Round
(India) S Karunakaran	21	21
(Germany) Oei K-y	9	18
(Hong Kong) J Gunawan	11	21	21
5	(Indonesia) S P Belawa	21	17	13

Fourth Round
(India) S Karunakaran	17	12
(Hong Kong) J Gunawan	21	21

==== Section 11 ====
First Round

Second Round
(Sweden) F Karlborg	21	21
(Peru) B Roque	6	6
(Scotland) J Apiliga	19	21	21
(New Zealand) J Feng	21	9	7
(Slovakia) A Antoska	21	21
(Czech Republic) J Janoštík	13	19
(Japan) R Takei	18	21	21
16	(Thailand) S Piyawatcharavijit	21	13	23

Third Round
(Sweden) F Karlborg	21	21
(Scotland) J Apiliga	15	17
(Slovakia) A Antoska	17	17
16	(Thailand) S Piyawatcharavijit	21	21

Fourth Round
(Sweden) F Karlborg	14	18
16	(Thailand) S Piyawatcharavijit	21	21

==== Section 12 ====
First Round

Second Round
(Latvia) M Ķirkums	9	9
(Bulgaria) I Stoynov	21	21
(Denmark) M J Møller	21	21
(Uzbekistan) B Kuchkarboev	9	12
(Armenia) M Harutyunyan	2	9
(Mongolia) S Enkhbat	21	21
(Singapore) D Ng	19	21	18
4	(China) Li YZ	21	16	21

Third Round
(Bulgaria) I Stoynov	12	22	9
(Denmark) M J Møller	21	20	21
(Mongolia) S Enkhbat	14	8
4	(China) Li YZ	21	21

Fourth Round
(Denmark) M J Møller	11	13
4	(China) Li YZ	21	21

==== Section 13 ====
First Round

Second Round
(Uganda) B Kasirye	23	15
(Hong Kong) Hung K C	25	21
(Sweden) G Bjorkler	7	15
(Japan) T Kawamoto	21	21
(Hungary) S Nagy	15	11
(Thailand) V Uraiwong	21	21
(Denmark) C Vittoriani	7	15
10	(France) C Popov	21	21

Third Round
(Hong Kong) Hung K C	11	8
(Japan) T Kawamoto	21	21
(Thailand) V Uraiwong	11	21	9
10	(France) C Popov	21	15	21

Fourth Round
(Japan) T Kawamoto	9	5
10	(France) C Popov	21	21

==== Section 14 ====
First Round

Second Round
(Russia) G Lebedev	18	15
(Chinese Taipei) Lin K-t	21	21
(New Zealand) R Tong	28	21
(Estonia) A Ajupov	26	15
(Finland) J Oldorff	20	21	21
(Malaysia) Lee S Y	22	16	16
(Norway) L Smith-Meyer	7	8
8	(Indonesia) C Adinata	21	21

Third Round
(Chinese Taipei) Lin K-t	21	21
(New Zealand) R Tong	8	10
(Finland) J Oldorff	9	15
8	(Indonesia) C Adinata	21	21

Fourth Round
(Chinese Taipei) Lin K-t	20	21	21
8	(Indonesia) C Adinata	22	16	17

==== Section 15 ====
First Round

Second Round
(Austria) N Rudolf	21	17	21
(Germany) A Sonnenschein	19	21	10
(United States) A Zheng	21	21
(Belarus) A Aliaksandrovich	14	9
(Latvia) A Zandovskis	6	3
(India) R Gurbani	21	21
(Sri Lanka) C Dias	13	12
11	(Spain) T Toledano	21	21

Third Round
(Austria) N Rudolf	21	21
(United States) A Zheng	18	13
(India) R Gurbani	16	21	23
11	(Spain) T Toledano	21	14	21

Fourth Round
(Austria) N Rudolf	7	16
(India) R Gurbani	21	21

==== Section 16 ====
First Round

Second Round
(China) Ren CM	21	21
(French Polynesia) L Beaubois	5	5
(South Korea) Kim B-j	21	21
(Israel) M Grinblat	11	17
(Scotland) C Smith	21	10	24
(Australia) J Yu	15	21	22
(Kazakhstan) A Korolev	2	4
2	(Canada) B Yang	21	21

Third Round
(China) Ren CM	21	21
(South Korea) Kim B-j	15	15
(Scotland) C Smith	6	2
2	(Canada) B Yang	21	21

Fourth Round
(China) Ren CM	21	25
2	(Canada) B Yang	18	23
