= 2018 BWF World Junior Championships – Boys' singles =

2018 BWF World Junior Championships Boys' Singles
Tournament details
- Dates: 12 – 18 November 2018
- Edition: 20th
- Level: International
- Venue: Markham Pan Am Centre
- Location: Markham, Canada

The boys' singles of the tournament 2018 BWF World Junior Championships was held on 12–18 November. The defending champion of the last edition was Kunlavut Vitidsarn from Thailand.

== Seeds ==
1. (Thailand) Kunlavut Vitidsarn (champion)
2. (Indonesia) Ikhsan Rumbay (fourth round)
3. (China) Li Shifeng (semifinals)
4. (India) Lakshya Sen (semifinals)
5. (France) Arnaud Merklé (third round)
6. (Republic of Ireland) Nhat Nguyen (quarterfinals)
7. (China) Bai Yupeng (second round)
8. (Singapore) Jason Teh (third round)

9. (Chinese Taipei) Chen Shiau-cheng (fourth round)
10. (Scotland) Christopher Grimley (first round)
11. (Belgium) Julien Carraggi (second round)
12. (Indonesia) Alberto Alvin Yulianto (quarterfinals)
13. (Germany) Lukas Resch (third round)
14. (Canada) Brian Yang (third round)
15. (Singapore) Joel Koh (second round)
16. (Ukraine) Danylo Bosniuk (third round)

Click on the seed number of a player to go to their draw section.

== Draw ==
=== Finals ===
Quarterfinals
1	(Thailand) Kunlavut Vitidsarn	21	21
12	(Indonesia) Alberto Alvin Yulianto	14	17
4	(India) Lakshya Sen	21	21
(Malaysia) Aidil Sholeh	8	18
6	(Republic of Ireland) Nhat Nguyen	21	10	14
3	(China) Li Shifeng	19	21	21
(Japan) Kodai Naraoka	21	21
(Malaysia) Ng Tze Yong	19	8

Semifinals
1	(Thailand) Kunlavut Vitidsarn	20	21	21
4	(India) Lakshya Sen	22	16	13
3	(China) Li Shifeng	11	21	17
(Japan) Kodai Naraoka	21	19	21

Finals
1	(Thailand) Kunlavut Vitidsarn	21	21
(Japan) Kodai Naraoka	9	11

=== Top half ===
==== Section 1 ====
First round
(Spain) M Cardona	12	20
(Germany) B Holtschke	21	21
(Kenya) U O Shah	4	6
(Scotland) J Apiliga	21	21
(Poland) K Budny	7	8
(China) Liu L	21	21
15	(Singapore) J Koh	21	21
(Sri Lanka) N Punchihewa	6	15
(Netherlands) D Koppen	18	17
(India) P Rajawat	21	21
(Slovakia) J Horak	6	5
(England) H Huang	21	21
(Uganda) E Emuddu	21	17	10
(South Africa) R Summers	10	21	21

Second round
1	(Thailand) K Vitidsarn	21	21
(Germany) B Holtschke	12	10
(Scotland) J Apiliga	12	9
(China) Liu L	21	21
15	(Singapore) J Koh	18	8
(India) P Rajawat	21	21
(England) H Huang	21	21
(South Africa) R Summers	4	9

Third round
1	(Thailand) K Vitidsarn	21	21
(China) Liu L	17	16
(India) P Rajawat	11	16
(England) H Huang	21	21

Fourth round
1	(Thailand) K Vitidsarn	21	21
(England) H Huang	9	7

==== Section 2 ====
First round
(Japan) T Kato	21	21
(South Korea) Jeong U-m	11	19
(Macau) Lee R H	12	7
(Indonesia) C Adinata	21	21
(Sri Lanka) S Gunatilleke	19	19
(United States) A Zheng	21	21
12	(Indonesia) A A Yulianto	21	21
(Sweden) C Hammarberg	17	15
(New Zealand) E Lau	21	21
(Ukraine) I Medynskiy	16	8
(Japan) R Ichii	21	21
(Faroe Islands) A A Myrini	6	5
(Mongolia) S Enkhbat	13	15
(Australia) P Yan	21	21

Second round
5	(France) A Merklé	21	21
(Japan) T Kato	19	18
(Indonesia) C Adinata	21	21
(United States) A Zheng	11	13
12	(Indonesia) A A Yulianto	21	21
(New Zealand) E Lau	16	5
(Japan) R Ichii	14	21	21
(Australia) P Yan	21	16	17

Third round
5	(France) A Merklé	19	12
(Indonesia) C Adinata	21	21
12	(Indonesia) A A Yulianto	21	21
(Japan) R Ichii	13	13

Fourth round
(Indonesia) C Adinata	19	16
12	(Indonesia) A A Yulianto	21	21

==== Section 3 ====
First round
(Peru) S de la Oliva	11	9
(Mexico) A Gaitan	21	21
(Austria) K Meusburger	21	21
(Uganda) A M N Vaheed	6	7
(Italy) G Toti	21	21
(Czech Republic) J Kral	12	15
9	(Chinese Taipei) Chen S-c	21	21
(Guyana) T Jeffrey	7	15
(Brazil) F Farias	21	21
(Sweden) J Azelius	12	11
(Norway) M Barth	21	21
(Australia) R Tang	15	10
(Indonesia) Karono	21	21	21
(Germany) M Kicklitz	11	23	13

Second round
4	(India) L Sen	21	21
(Mexico) A Gaitan	13	9
(Austria) K Meusburger	8	10
(Italy) G Toti	21	21
9	(Chinese Taipei) Chen S-c	21	21
(Brazil) F Farias	16	6
(Norway) M Barth	8	15
(Indonesia) Karono	21	21

Third round
4	(India) L Sen	21	21
(Italy) G Toti	7	13
9	(Chinese Taipei) Chen S-c	21	21
(Indonesia) Karono	15	9

Fourth round
4	(India) L Sen	15	21	21
9	(Chinese Taipei) Chen S-c	21	17	14

==== Section 4 ====
First round
7	(China) Bai YP	21	21
(Kenya) M Solanki	5	3
(South Korea) Park H-s	21	21
(Mexico) G Saavedra	8	10
(Brazil) I Batalha	15	11
(Scotland) A Pringle	21	21
(Hong Kong) Ko S H	17	21	14
(Malaysia) Aidil S	21	19	21
14	(Canada) B Yang	21	21
(Peru) D Subauste	10	8
(Portugal) T Coelho	14	4
(Denmark) O Sunekaer	21	21
(Japan) R Hatano	21	11	21
(Moldova) C Savin	17	21	11
(Canada) A Nguyen	21	15	21
(Switzerland) N A. Mueller	18	21	14

Second round
7	(China) Bai YP	21	16	13
(South Korea) Park H-s	8	21	21
(Scotland) A Pringle	6	7
(Malaysia) Aidil S	21	21
14	(Canada) B Yang	21	21
(Denmark) O Sunekaer	10	16
(Japan) R Hatano	21	21
(Canada) A Nguyen	7	13

Third round
(South Korea) Park H-s	21	17	18
(Malaysia) Aidil S	19	21	21
14	(Canada) B Yang	11	10
(Japan) R Hatano	21	21

Fourth round
(Malaysia) Aidil S	21	21
(Japan) R Hatano	19	13

=== Bottom half ===
==== Section 5 ====
First round
(Hong Kong) Mak P N	21	21
(Netherlands) F Achthoven	14	12
(Poland) M Szymanowski	15	21	14
(Sri Lanka) D Abeywickrama	21	15	21
(New Zealand) O Guo	19	17
(Thailand) S Piyawatcharavijit	21	21
(Spain) T Toledano	21	20	14
11	(Belgium) J Carraggi	18	22	21
(France) C Popov	19	17
(Chinese Taipei) Yu S-p	21	21
(Brazil) J Matias	21	21
(Czech Republic) J Janostik	19	12
(United States) R Zheng	21	21
(Mexico) J Rodriguez	18	19
(Italy) E Baroni	8	12
6	(Republic of Ireland) N Nguyen	21	21

Second round
(Hong Kong) Mak P N	13	21	21
(Sri Lanka) D Abeywickrama	21	7	11
(Thailand) S Piyawatcharavijit	'21	21
11	(Belgium) J Carraggi	15	18
(Chinese Taipei) Yu S-p	8	20
(Brazil) J Matias	21	22
(United States) R Zheng	9	6
6	(Republic of Ireland) N Nguyen	21	21

Third round
(Hong Kong) Mak P N	21	17	11
(Thailand) S Piyawatcharavijit	11	21	21
(Brazil) J Matias	9	9
6	(Republic of Ireland) N Nguyen	21	21

Fourth round
(Thailand) S Piyawatcharavijit	14	13
6	(Republic of Ireland) N Nguyen	21	21

==== Section 6 ====
First round
(Sweden) J Hansson	21	21
(Faroe Islands) J Djurhuus	13	15
(Peru) N Macisa	12	10
(South Korea) Choi J-h	21	21
(Austria) N Rudolf	21	28
(New Zealand) R Tong	17	26
(Malaysia) Yap R K	11	17
16	(Ukraine) D Bosniuk	21	21
(Denmark) M Johannesen	21	21
(Uganda) B Kasirye	12	8
(Switzerland) Y Orteu	14	8
(India) A Mishra	21	21
(Singapore) Lee W H	21	21
(South Korea) Lee H-j	16	17

Second round
(Sweden) J Hansson	8	16
(South Korea) Choi J-h	21	21
(Austria) N Rudolf	13	18
16	(Ukraine) D Bosniuk	21	21
(Denmark) M Johannesen	19	19
(India) A Mishra	21	21
(Singapore) Lee W H	12	12
3	(China) Li SF	21	21

Third round
(South Korea) Choi J-h	21	21
16	(Ukraine) D Bosniuk	19	19
(India) A Mishra	15	12
3	(China) Li SF	21	21

Fourth round
(South Korea) Choi J-h	13	11
3	(China) Li SF	21	21

==== Section 7 ====
First round
(Chinese Taipei) Wu C-e	10	11
(China) Zhang WY	21	21
(United States) K Kalyanasundaram	21	21
(Kenya) U O Shah	2	7
(England) Z Russ	21	18	21
(Macau) Pui P F	11	21	9
(Thailand) R Oupthong	21	21
10	(Scotland) C Grimley	11	13
(Portugal) R Tremoceiro	11	12
(Japan) K Naraoka	21	21
(South Africa) J Elliott	12	9
(France) Y Gaudin	21	21
(Spain) M S Luis	18	13
(Australia) Teoh K C	21	21

Second round
(China) Zhang WY	21	21
(United States) K Kalyanasundaram	5	5
(England) Z Russ	21	18	16
(Thailand) R Oupthong	13	21	21
(Japan) K Naraoka	21	21
(France) Y Gaudin	15	10
(Australia) Teoh K C	17	17
8	(Singapore) J Teh	21	21

Third round
(China) Zhang WY	21	21
(Thailand) R Oupthong	7	13
(Japan) K Naraoka	21	18	21
8	(Singapore) J Teh	10	21	16

Fourth round
(China) Zhang WY	20	16
(Japan) K Naraoka	22	21

==== Section 8 ====
First round
(Faroe Islands) A M. Jacobsen	13	16
(Norway) J Osthassel	21	21
(Malaysia) Ng T Y	18	21	21
(Thailand) S Jamsri	21	18	13
(Poland) A Niczyporuk	21	21
(Mongolia) T Gombodorj	14	15
(Ukraine) G Beketov	13	11
13	(Germany) L Resch	21	21
(Guyana) A Haynes	8	7
(Slovakia) A Antoska	21	21
(India) K George	21	21
(Canada) K Wang	17	12
(Malaysia) W Goh
(Norway) B Norden	w	/	o

Second round
(Norway) J Osthassel	10	7
(Malaysia) Ng T Y	21	21
(Poland) A Niczyporuk	6	10
13	(Germany) L Resch	21	21
(Slovakia) A Antoska	18	14
(India) K George	21	21
(Norway) B Norden	10	8
2	(Indonesia) I Rumbay	21	21

Third round
(Malaysia) Ng T Y	21	16	21
13	(Germany) L Resch	17	21	13
(India) K George	21	19	17
2	(Indonesia) I Rumbay	12	21	21

Fourth round
(Malaysia) Ng T Y	21	21
2	(Indonesia) I Rumbay	13	5
