= 2017 BWF World Junior Championships – Boys' singles =

2017 BWF World Junior Championships Boys' singles
Tournament details
- Dates: 16–22 October
- Edition: 19th
- Level: International
- Venue: Among Rogo Sports Hall
- Location: Yogyakarta, Indonesia

The boys' singles event of the 2017 BWF World Junior Championships was held on 16–22 October. The defending champion was Sun Feixiang from China.

== Seeds ==
1. (Thailand) Kunlavut Vitidsarn (champion)
2. (India) Lakshya Sen (quarterfinals)
3. (Chinese Taipei) Lee Chia-hao (fourth round)
4. (Malaysia) Leong Jun Hao (final)
5. (Thailand) Ruttanapak Oupthong (fifth round)
6. (Japan) Kodai Naraoka (semifinals)
7. (Indonesia) Ikhsan Rumbay (third round)
8. (Republic of Ireland) Nhat Nguyen (quarterfinals)

9. (Kazakhstan) Dmitriy Panarin (third round)
10. (Moldova) Cristian Savin (fourth round)
11. (France) Arnaud Merklé (fifth round)
12. (Malaysia) Sim Fong Hau (fourth round)
13. (India) Kartikey Gulshan Kumar (fifth round)
14. (France) Christo Popov (quarterfinals)
15. (France) Leo Rossi (fifth round)
16. (Hong Kong) Chan Yin Chak (third round)

Click on the seed number of a player to go to their draw section.

== Draw ==
=== Finals ===
Fifth round
1	(Thailand) Kunlavut Vitidsarn	22	21
(Hong Kong) Ko Shing Hei	20	14
(Japan) Takuma Obayashi	21	21
(Japan) Hikaru Minegishi	12	14
(China) Gao Zhengze	21	21
11	(France) Arnaud Merklé	18	19
8	(Republic of Ireland) Nhat Nguyen	18	21	21
13	(India) Kartikey Gulshan Kumar	21	15	13
14	(France) Christo Popov	21	21
5	(Thailand) Ruttanapak Oupthong	16	17
15	(France) Léo Rossi	16	17
4	(Malaysia) Leong Jun Hao	21	21
(Indonesia) Alberto Alvin Yulianto	16	15
6	(Japan) Kodai Naraoka	21	21
(Indonesia) Muhammad Rehan Diaz	12	12
2	(India) Lakshya Sen	21	21

Quarterfinals
1	(Thailand) Kunlavut Vitidsarn	25	21
(Japan) Takuma Obayashi	23	15
(China) Gao Zhengze	18	21	21
8	(Republic of Ireland) Nhat Nguyen	21	18	7
14	(France) Christo Popov	14	12
4	(Malaysia) Leong Jun Hao	21	21
6	(Japan) Kodai Naraoka	14	21	21
2	(India) Lakshya Sen	21	17	14

Semifinals
1	(Thailand) Kunlavut Vitidsarn	21	21
(China) Gao Zhengze	16	13
4	(Malaysia) Leong Jun Hao	21	22
6	(Japan) Kodai Naraoka	14	20

Finals
1	(Thailand) Kunlavut Vitidsarn	17	21	21
4	(Malaysia) Leong Jun Hao	21	15	9

=== Top half ===
==== Section 1 ====
First round
(Pakistan) R M Z Haider	10	15
(Spain) A Vazquez	21	21

Second round
1	(Thailand) K Vitidsarn	21	21
(Poland) R Cybulski	6	8
(New Zealand) D Vong	7	9
(China) Gu JF	21	21
(Vietnam) Le T L	5	7
(Singapore) J Koh	21	21
(Nepal) P K Lingthen	16	15
(Spain) A Vazquez	21	21

Third round
1	(Thailand) K Vitidsarn	21	13	21
(China) Gu JF	17	21	18
(Singapore) J Koh	19	21	21
(Spain) A Vazquez	21	18	12

Fourth round
1	(Thailand) K Vitidsarn	21	21
(Singapore) J Koh	18	9

==== Section 2 ====
First round
(Hong Kong) Ko S H	15	21	21
(Finland) J Paul	21	17	19
(Australia) Lin Y X	21	15	12
(Denmark) M Johannesen	15	21	21

Second round
9	(Kazakhstan) D Panarin	21	21
(South Africa) J Elliot	5	10
(New Zealand) E Lau	21	9	14
(Chinese Taipei) Huang P-h	19	21	21
(Ghana) D Doe	21	21
(Kenya) U O Shah	11	5
(Hong Kong) Ko S H	20	21	21
(Denmark) M Johannesen	22	14	16

Third round
9	(Kazakhstan) D Panarin	14	9
(Chinese Taipei) Huang P-h	21	21
(Ghana) D Doe	5	7
(Hong Kong) Ko S H	21	21

Fourth round
(Chinese Taipei) Huang P-h	14	17
(Hong Kong) Ko S H	21	21

==== Section 3 ====
First round
(South Korea) Kim S-j	24	17
(Malaysia) A S A Sadikin	26	21

Second round
7	(Indonesia) I Rumbay	21	21
(Brunei) M H H Bakri	6	2
(Japan) T Obayashi	21	21
(Macau) Leong I C	3	15
(Ghana) E Botwe	5	10
(Brazil) F Farias	21	21
(Canada) M Kanyasi	11	8
(Malaysia) A S A Sadikin	21	21

Third round
7	(Indonesia) I Rumbay	21	19	17
(Japan) T Obayashi	16	21	21
(Brazil) F Farias	21	21
(Malaysia) A S A Sadikin	13	16

Fourth round
(Japan) T Obayashi	21	21
(Brazil) F Farias	11	14

==== Section 4 ====
First round
(Italy) G Toti	21	21
(Timor-Leste) M A Sarmento	9	8
(Switzerland) J Scheiwiller	17	14
(Japan) H Minegishi	21	21

Second round
12	(Malaysia) Sim F H	21	21
(Georgia (country)) L Ninoshvili	8	7
(Hong Kong) Chow H L	21	21
(Armenia) G Grigoryan	6	5
(Thailand) S Jamsri	21	21
(Latvia) A Kelpe	11	4
(Italy) G Toti	10	10
(Japan) H Minegishi	21	21

Third round
12	(Malaysia) Sim F H	18	21	21
(Hong Kong) Chow H L	21	12	11
(Thailand) S Jamsri	10	12
(Japan) H Minegishi	21	21

Fourth round
12	(Malaysia) Sim F H	12	21	18
(Japan) H Minegishi	21	19	21

==== Section 5 ====
First round
(Hungary) Z Dulcz	13	14
(El Salvador) U Canjura	21	21

Second round
3	(Chinese Taipei) Lee C-h	21	21
(Czech Republic) J Janostik	9	9
(Belgium) J Carraggi	21	21
(Bulgaria) I Stoynov	16	17
(China) Gao ZZ	21	21
(South Korea) Kim M-j	16	15
(Sweden) O Svensson	17	20
(El Salvador) U Canjura	21	22

Third round
3	(Chinese Taipei) Lee C-h	21	20	21
(Belgium) J Carraggi	11	22	16
(China) Gao ZZ	21	21
(El Salvador) U Canjura	14	15

Fourth round
3	(Chinese Taipei) Lee C-h	17	16
(China) Gao ZZ	21	21

==== Section 6 ====
First round
(India) R Bharadwaj B.M.	21	21
(Maldives) M A Ali	3	4
(Bulgaria) A Popov	21	21
(Macau) Lam H H	11	17

Second round
11	(France) A Merklé	21	21
(Philippines) L R Zafra	15	14
(Slovakia) P Hrncar	11	27	21
(Egypt) M M Kamel	21	25	19
(Mongolia) T Gombodorj	9	9
(Russia) N Lemeshko	21	21
(India) R Bharadwaj B.M.	21	21
(Bulgaria) A Popov	5	6

Third round
11	(France) A Merklé	21	21
(Slovakia) P Hrncar	4	18
(Russia) N Lemeshko	12	9
(India) R Bharadwaj B.M.	21	21

Fourth round
11	(France) A Merklé	21	10	21
(India) R Bharadwaj B.M.	19	21	14

==== Section 7 ====
First round
(Hungary) G Pytel	21	21
(Saudi Arabia) A Alharthi	3	1
(Norway) O H Imset	11	17
(Germany) M Kicklitz	21	21

Second round
8	(Republic of Ireland) N Nguyen	21	21
(Philippines) A S Salvado	17	12
(Russia) G Karpov	21	21
(Scotland) C Grimley	14	19
(Denmark) M Thogersen	21	21
(Iraq) M Talib	10	2
(Hungary) G Pytel	24	21
(Germany) M Kicklitz	22	5

Third round
8	(Republic of Ireland) N Nguyen	21	21
(Russia) G Karpov	14	8
(Denmark) M Thogersen	21	21
(Hungary) G Pytel	16	15

Fourth round
8	(Republic of Ireland) N Nguyen	21	21
(Denmark) M Thogersen	18	19

==== Section 8 ====
First round
(Canada) B Yang	21	21
(Norway) B Norden	10	9
(England) R Easton	21	21
(Turkey) Y Yasar	19	11

Second round
13	(India) K G Kumar	21	21
(Poland) T Malik	7	9
(Sri Lanka) R Sasindu	15	21	21
(Australia) P Yan	21	13	16
(United States) Wu YT	21	21
(Finland) M Lahtinen	15	19
(Canada) B Yang	21	21
(England) R Easton	17	9

Third round
13	(India) K G Kumar	21	21
(Sri Lanka) R Sasindu	10	17
(United States) Wu YT	16	15
(Canada) B Yang	21	21

Fourth round
13	(India) K G Kumar	21	21
(Canada) B Yang	15	12

=== Bottom half ===
==== Section 9 ====
First round
(Spain) A Alcala	21	21
(Lebanon) F Alfred	5	4
(United States) R Liuzhou	21	21
(Russia) M Lavrikov	13	18

Second round
(Spain) A Alcala	20	16
(United States) R Liuzhou	22	21
(Thailand) P Nipornram	19	19
(Germany) L Resch	21	21
(Egypt) B T Abdelrahim	23	18	8
(Slovakia) A Horak	21	21	21
(Brunei) Lee J S	6	5
14	(France) C Popov	21	21

Third round
(United States) R Liuzhou	21	23	21
(Germany) L Resch	14	25	19
(Slovakia) A Horak	14	3
14	(France) C Popov	21	21

Fourth round
(United States) R Liuzhou	16	21	17
14	(France) C Popov	21	17	21

==== Section 10 ====
First round
(Belgium) A Lallemand	6	14
(Australia) Teoh K C	21	21
(South Korea) Ki D-j	21	21
(Philippines) S Padiz Jr	8	11

Second round
(Australia) Teoh K C	11	10
(South Korea) Ki D-j	21	21
(Georgia (country)) P Piltoyan	16	21	12
(El Salvador) C Henrriquez	21	19	21
(Belgium) J Cansse	22	20	14
(Sri Lanka) V Fernando	20	22	21
(Scotland) C Pringle	6	14
5	(Thailand) R Oupthong	21	21

Third round
(South Korea) Ki D-j	21	21
(El Salvador) C Henrriquez	8	6
(Sri Lanka) V Fernando	14	7
5	(Thailand) R Oupthong	21	21

Fourth round
(South Korea) Ki D-j	21	12	18
5	(Thailand) R Oupthong	15	21	21

==== Section 11 ====
First round
(England) H Huang	21	21
(Nepal) P Maharjan	15	8
(South Africa) R Summers	7	8
(Denmark) J Toft	21	21

Second round
(England) H Huang	11	18
(Denmark) J Toft	21	21
(Kenya) U O Shah	8	10
(Slovakia) A Antoska	21	21
(United States) G Kalyanasundaram	12	11
(Netherlands) D Koppen	21	21
(Mongolia) S Enkhbat	2	6
15	(France) L Rossi	21	21

Third round
(Denmark) J Toft	21	22
(Slovakia) A Antoska	15	20
(Netherlands) D Koppen	15	10
15	(France) L Rossi	21	21

Fourth round
(Denmark) J Toft	10	21	20
15	(France) L Rossi	21	17	22

==== Section 12 ====
First round
(Finland) A Monnberg	17	14
(England) J Torjussen	21	21

Second round
(England) J Torjussen	21	21
(Switzerland) D Orteu	8	18
(Iraq) K Hussein	9	4
(Norway) M Barth	21	21
(Brazil) W V E Santos	21	17	10
(Vietnam) Nguyen H D	16	21	21
(Scotland) M Grimley	13	12
4	(Malaysia) Leong J H	21	21

Third round
(England) J Torjussen	23	21	21
(Norway) M Barth	25	17	14
(Vietnam) Nguyen H D	12	16
4	(Malaysia) Leong J H	21	21

Fourth round
(England) J Torjussen	8	14
4	(Malaysia) Leong J H	21	21

==== Section 13 ====
First round
(Indonesia) A A Yulianto	21	21
(Macau) Pui P F	18	12
(Italy) F Caponio	21	21
(Sri Lanka) G Thilakarathna	5	11

Second round
(Indonesia) A A Yulianto	22	22
(Italy) F Caponio	20	20
(Bulgaria) D Marinov	7	7
(China) Bai YP	21	21
(Ghana) E Andrews	21	18	21
(Nepal) R Maharjan	13	21	11
(Singapore) N Yap	18	18
10	(Moldova) C Savin	21	21

Third round
(Indonesia) A A Yulianto	21	24
(China) Bai YP	19	22
(Ghana) E Andrews	24	8	13
10	(Moldova) C Savin	22	21	21

Fourth round
(Indonesia) A A Yulianto	21	10	21
10	(Moldova) C Savin	12	21	9

==== Section 14 ====
First round
(Pakistan) M T Shafiq	12	14
(Czech Republic) T Svejda	21	21

Second round
(Czech Republic) T Svejda	9	14
(Chinese Taipei) Huang D-w	21	21
(Chinese Taipei) Lin C-y	21	21
(Czech Republic) M Aubus	5	6
(Latvia) M Loiko	7	10
(Ukraine) D Bosniuk	21	21
(India) A Tandon	10	12
6	(Japan) K Naraoka	21	21

Third round
(Chinese Taipei) Huang D-w	16	14
(Chinese Taipei) Lin C-y	21	21
(Ukraine) D Bosniuk	10	11
6	(Japan) K Naraoka	21	21

Fourth round
(Chinese Taipei) Lin C-y	14	6
6	(Japan) K Naraoka	21	21

==== Section 15 ====
First round
(Sweden) C Hammarberg	21	21
(Maldives) A Nibal	7	5
(Singapore) J Tan	21	21
(Armenia) A Vardanyan	2	7

Second round
(Sweden) C Hammarberg	20	21	19
(Singapore) J Tan	22	16	21
(Japan) H Midorikawa	21	19	19
(Indonesia) M R Diaz	15	21	21
(New Zealand) O Guo	21	21
(South Africa) S Noone	7	6
(Timor-Leste) C M D Anjos	2	5
16	(Hong Kong) Chan Y C	21	21

Third round
(Singapore) J Tan	10	21	12
(Indonesia) M R Diaz	21	16	21
(New Zealand) O Guo	21	11	23
16	(Hong Kong) Chan Y C	16	21	21

Fourth round
(Indonesia) M R Diaz	22	22	21
(New Zealand) O Guo	24	20	11

==== Section 16 ====
First round
(Saudi Arabia) A Alothman	6	3
(China) Li SF	21	21

Second round
(China) Li SF	21	21
(Canada) M Morneau	13	15
(Poland) A Szolc	16	11
(Turkey) Y Calisir	21	21
(Indonesia) G P F Cupu	25	21	23
(Malaysia) Ng T Y	27	11	21
(Hungary) M Balint	5	5
2	(India) L Sen	21	21

Third round
(China) Li SF	21	21
(Turkey) Y Calisir	8	18
(Indonesia) G P F Cupu	15	19
2	(India) L Sen	21	21

Fourth round
(China) Li SF	16	11
2	(India) L Sen	21	21
