= Syabda Perkasa Belawa =

Indonesian badminton player (2001–2023)

Personal information
- Born: 25 August 2001 Jakarta, Indonesia
- Died: 20 March 2023 (aged 21) Pemalang, Central Java, Indonesia

Sport
- Country: Indonesia
- Sport: Badminton
- Handedness: Right

Men's singles
- Highest ranking: 87 (21 February 2023)
- BWF profile
Medal record
Men's badminton
Representing Indonesia
Thomas Cup
Silver medal – second place	2022 Bangkok	Men's team
World Junior Championships
Gold medal – first place	2019 Kazan	Mixed team
Asian Junior Championships
Silver medal – second place	2019 Suzhou	Mixed team

Syabda Perkasa Belawa (25 August 2001 – 20 March 2023) was an Indonesian badminton player affiliated with PB Djarum badminton club from 2013 to 2023, and joined Indonesia national badminton team training center in 2018.

== Career ==
=== 2019 ===
In 2019, Syabda was called up to the junior national team for the 2019 Badminton Asia Junior Championships in Suzhou, China, and the BWF World Junior Championships in Kazan, Russia. The team lost the former's final 2–3 to Thailand but won the latter's teams event after dismantling record 13-time title holders China 3–1 in the final.

=== 2022 ===
On 18 April 2022, he was called up to the Indonesia national team for the 2022 Thomas Cup in Nonthaburi, Thailand. The team failed to defend their title after suffering a 0–3 final defeat to India, winning their first title against the record 14-time champions. In June, Syabda won the Lithuanian International after beating fellow Indonesian player Alwi Farhan. In November, Syabda won the Malaysia International after beating Chinese player Lei Lanxi.

=== 2023 ===
In 2023, Syabda only got a chance to play at the Iran Fajr International. He won the title after defeating Malaysian Justin Hoh in three games.

== Death ==
On March 20, Syabda was involved in a traffic accident at Pemalang-Batang Toll Road. He was travelling from Bekasi to Sragen with his parents and siblings to attend the funeral of his late grandmother. The car his father was driving hit a truck at high speed. His mother was pronounced dead on the scene, while Syabda sustained severe head injuries. He briefly received treatment at the Al-Ikhlas Islamic Hospital in Pemalang before succumbing to his injuries. Syabda's elder sister Diana, his younger sister Tahta, and their father were also injured, but survived the accident.

Syabda was buried in a public cemetery in Sumberejo Village in Sragen, together with his mother and grandmother.

== Achievements ==
=== BWF International Challenge/Series (3 titles) ===
Men's singles
Year	Tournament	Opponent	Score	Result	Ref.
2022	Lithuanian International	(Indonesia) Alwi Farhan	21–15, 21–14	(gold) Winner	
2022	Malaysia International	(China) Lei Lanxi	21–17, 21–18	(gold) Winner	
2023	Iran Fajr International	(Malaysia) Justin Hoh	18–21, 21–12, 22–20	(gold) Winner	

BWF International Challenge tournament
BWF International Series tournament
BWF Future Series tournament

=== BWF Junior International (1 title) ===
Boys' singles
Year	Tournament	Opponent	Score	Result
2019	Jakarta Junior International	(France) Christo Popov	21–14, 21–17	(gold) Winner

BWF Junior International Grand Prix tournament
BWF Junior International Challenge tournament
BWF Junior International Series tournament
BWF Junior Future Series tournament

== Performance timeline ==
Key

W	Won	F	Finalist	SF	Semi-finalist
QF	Quarter-finalist	#R	Rounds 4, 3, 2, 1	RR	Round-robin stage
Q#	Qualification round	A	Absent	w/d	Withdrew
G	Gold	S	Silver	B	Bronze
NH	Not held	N/A	Not applicable	DNQ	Did not qualify

=== National team ===
- Junior level

Team events	2019
Asian Junior Championships	S
World Junior Championships	G

- Senior level

Team events	2022
Thomas Cup	S

=== Individual competitions ===
- Junior level

Team events	2018	2019
Asian Junior Championships	3R	3R
World Junior Championships	A	3R

- Senior level

Tournament	BWF World Tour					Best
Tournament	2018	2019	2020	2021	2022	Best
Indonesia Masters	A	Q1	A			Q1 ('19)
Indonesia Masters Super 100	3R	A	NH		1R	3R ('18)
Year-end ranking	231	490	572	588	128	88
