= 2019 Badminton Asia Junior Championships – Boys' singles =

Tournament details
- Dates: 24 – 28 July 2019
- Edition: 22
- Venue: Suzhou Olympic Sports Centre
- Location: Suzhou, China

The boys' singles tournament of the 2019 Badminton Asia Junior Championships will be held from 24 to 28 July. Lakshya Sen from India clinched this title in the last edition.

== Seeds ==
Seeds were announced on 2 July.

1. (Thailand) Kunlavut Vitidsarn (champion)
2. (Indonesia) Christian Adinata (second round)
3. (Indonesia) Syabda Perkasa Belawa (third round)
4. (China) Liu Liang (final)
5. (China) Li Yunze (semifinals)
6. (South Korea) Park Hyeon-seung (quarterfinals)
7. (Indonesia) Yonathan Ramlie (third round)
8. (Indonesia) Bobby Setiabudi (third round)

== Draw ==
=== Finals ===
Quarterfinals
1 | (Thailand) Kunlavut Vitidsarn | 21 | 21
(Hong Kong) Ko Shing Hei | 13 | 14
(China) Ren Chengming | 12 | 21 | 19
5 | (China) Li Yunze | 21 | 19 | 21
(Chinese Taipei) Chiang Chien-wei | 14 | 19
4 | (China) Liu Liang | 21 | 21
6 | (South Korea) Park Hyeon-seung | 14 | 21 | 14
(Chinese Taipei) Su Li-yang | 21 | 14 | 21

Semifinals
1 | (Thailand) Kunlavut Vitidsarn | 21 | 16 | 21
5 | (China) Li Yunze | 17 | 21 | 14
4 | (China) Liu Liang | 21 | 21
(Chinese Taipei) Su Li-yang | 9 | 17

Final
1 | (Thailand) Kunlavut Vitidsarn | 21 | 21
4 | (China) Liu Liang | 14 | 13

=== Top half ===
==== Section 1 ====
First round
(India) M Luwang | 21 | 17 | 23
(South Korea) Park S-y | 18 | 21 | 21
(Vietnam) Nguyễn T T | 22 | 21
(Singapore) M Lim Y Z | 20 | 12
(Bangladesh) M Hanif | 8 | 7
(Chinese Taipei) Yu S-p | 21 | 21
(Malaysia) Kok J H | 21 | 24
(China) Ye HK | 16 | 22
(Iran) A Karami | 11 | 6
(Hong Kong) Ko S H | 21 | 21

Second round
1 | (Thailand) K Vitidsarn | 18 | 21 | 21
(India) M Luwang | 21 | 15 | 8
(Vietnam) Nguyễn T T | 17 | 10
(Chinese Taipei) Yu S-p | 21 | 21
8 | (Indonesia) B Setiabudi | 21 | 13 | 21
(Malaysia) Kok J H | 10 | 21 | 17
(Hong Kong) Ko S H | 21 | 21
(Macau) Vong K W | 9 | 12

Third round
1 | (Thailand) K Vitidsarn | 21 | 21
(Chinese Taipei) Yu S-p | 19 | 14
8 | (Indonesia) B Setiabudi | 19 | 21
(Hong Kong) Ko S H | 21 | 23

Quarterfinals
1 | (Thailand) K Vitidsarn | 21 | 21
(Hong Kong) Ko S H | 13 | 14

==== Section 2 ====
First round
(Singapore) D M Ng W S | 21 | 21
(Macau) Lee R H | 14 | 9
(South Korea) Jin Y | 21 | 21
(Bangladesh) G Singha | 8 | 10
(Chinese Taipei) Liao J-f | 21 | 21
(Sri Lanka) D Abeywickrama | 9 | 17
(Hong Kong) Hong F | 10 | 13
(Thailand) N Mangkornloi | 21 | 21
(India) S Gupta | 21 | 21
(Nepal) P Maharjan | 10 | 3

Second round
3 | (Indonesia) S P Belawa | 21 | 21
(Singapore) D M Ng W S | 19 | 17
(China) Ren CM | 21 | 16 | 21
(South Korea) Jin Y | 16 | 21 | 16
5 | (China) Li YZ | 21 | 21
(Chinese Taipei) Liao J-f | 11 | 16
(Thailand) N Mangkornloi | 21 | 21
(India) S Gupta | 17 | 10

Third round
3 | (Indonesia) S P Belawa | 12 | 21 | 9
(China) Ren CM | 21 | 11 | 21
5 | (China) Li YZ | 21 | 21
(Thailand) N Mangkornloi | 14 | 8

Quarterfinals
(China) Ren CM | 12 | 21 | 19
5 | (China) Li YZ | 21 | 19 | 21

=== Bottom half ===
==== Section 3 ====
First round
(Chinese Taipei) Chiang C-w | 21 | 21
(Macau) Ao F L | 11 | 10
(Mongolia) S Lkhaasuren | 13 | 6
(Malaysia) Fazriq R | 21 | 21
(India) S Subramanian | 21 | 21
(Bangladesh) Md. A H Lukman | 1 | 10
(South Korea) Lee H-j | 21 | 21
(Hong Kong) Poon C L | 19 | 11
(Thailand) S Piyawatcharavijit | 21 | 21
(Vietnam) Nguyễn Đ H | 11 | 12
(Singapore) B Lee | 16 | 12
(Nepal) P Dahal | 21 | 21

Second round
(Chinese Taipei) Chiang C-w | 21 | 21
(Malaysia) Fazriq R | 16 | 17
(India) S Subramanian | 19 | 14
7 | (Indonesia) Y Ramlie | 21 | 21
(South Korea) Lee H-j | 17 | 16
(Thailand) S Piyawatcharavijit | 21 | 21
(Nepal) P Dahal | 5 | 13
4 | (China) Liu L | 21 | 21

Third round
(Chinese Taipei) Chiang C-w | 21 | 21
7 | (Indonesia) Y Ramlie | 18 | 18
(Thailand) S Piyawatcharavijit | 17 | 16
4 | (China) Liu L | 21 | 21

Quarterfinals
(Chinese Taipei) Chiang C-w | 14 | 19
4 | (China) Liu L | 21 | 21

==== Section 4 ====
First round
(Mongolia) S Enkhbat | 27 | 9 | 21
(Macau) Pui C C | 25 | 21 | 19
(Sri Lanka) L de Silva | 9 | 17
(India) S Karunakaran | 21 | 21
(Thailand) W Chuenkha | 11 | 15
(China) Wang YF | 21 | 21
(Chinese Taipei) Su L-y | 21 | 21
(Hong Kong) J Gunawan | 7 | 9
(Bangladesh) K A Soad | 8 | 12
(Singapore) N Yap | 21 | 21
(China) Dong TY | 14 | 21 | 21
(Malaysia) Lee S Y | 21 | 13 | 16

Second round
(Mongolia) S Enkhbat | 11 | 7
(India) S Karunakaran | 21 | 21
(China) Wang YF | 16 | 16
6 | (South Korea) Park H-s | 21 | 21
(Chinese Taipei) Su L-y | 21 | 21
(Singapore) N Yap | 8 | 12
(China) Dong TY | 21 | 10 | 21
2 | (Indonesia) C Adinata | 13 | 21 | 19

Third round
(India) S Karunakaran | 21 | 10 | 7
6 | (South Korea) Park H-s | 12 | 21 | 21
(Chinese Taipei) Su L-y | 21 | 21
(China) Dong TY | 17 | 17

Quarterfinals
6 | (South Korea) Park H-s | 14 | 21 | 14
(Chinese Taipei) Su L-y | 21 | 14 | 21
