= 2019 BWF World Junior Championships – Teams event =

2019 BWF World Junior Championships

2019 BWF World Junior Championships Teams event
Tournament details
- Dates: 30 September – 5 October 2019
- Edition: 21st
- Level: International
- Nations: 43
- Venue: Kazan Gymnastics Center
- Location: Kazan, Russia
- Winner: Indonesia

The teams event of the 2019 BWF World Junior Championships was held from 30 September to 5 October 2019. The event was also known as the 2019 Suhandinata Cup. China was the 13-time defending champions in this event.

43 countries representing all five continental federations competed in this event. The group draw was done on 8 September. First seed, Indonesia were drawn with Finland and Uganda in group A1. Russia as the host were drawn with Canada, Macau, Hong Kong and Malaysia in group B.

== Group stage ==
=== Group A ===
==== Group A1 ====
Pos	Team	Pld	W	L	MF	MA	MD	GF	GA	GD	PF	PA	PD	Pts	Qualification	Indonesia national badminton team	Finland national badminton team	Uganda national badminton team
1	Indonesia [1]	2	2	0	10	0	+10	20	0	+20	420	154	+266	2	Advance to Play-off A1	—	5–0	5–0
2	Finland [17/43]	2	1	1	5	5	0	10	10	0	308	353	−45	1	Advance to Play-off A2		—	5–0
3	Uganda [17/43]	2	0	2	0	10	−10	0	20	−20	199	420	−221	0	Advance to Play-off A3			—

Updated to match(es) played on 1 October 2019. Source: TS

==== Group A2 ====
Pos	Team	Pld	W	L	MF	MA	MD	GF	GA	GD	PF	PA	PD	Pts	Qualification	Spain national badminton team	Hungary national badminton team	Kazakhstan national badminton team
1	Spain [9/16]	2	2	0	8	2	+6	17	4	+13	414	268	+146	2	Advance to Play-off A1	—	3–2	5–0
2	Hungary [17/43]	2	1	1	7	3	+4	14	7	+7	395	333	+62	1	Advance to Play-off A2		—	5–0
3	Kazakhstan [17/43]	2	0	2	0	10	−10	0	20	−20	212	420	−208	0	Advance to Play-off A3			—

First match(es) will be played: 30 September 2019. Source: TS

==== Group A play-offs ====
Play-off A1
Indonesia [1]	3
Spain [9/16]	0

Play-off A2
Finland [17/43]	1
Hungary [17/43]	3

Play-off A3
Uganda [17/43]	1
Kazakhstan [17/43]	3

=== Group B ===
Pos	Team	Pld	W	L	MF	MA	MD	GF	GA	GD	PF	PA	PD	Pts	Qualification	Hong Kong national badminton team	Malaysia national badminton team	Russia national badminton team	Canada national badminton team	Macau national badminton team
1	Hong Kong [17/43]	4	4	0	15	5	+10	35	14	+21	961	794	+167	4	Qualified to knockout stage 1st to 8th	—	3–2			
2	Malaysia [17/43]	4	3	1	14	6	+8	31	18	+13	948	733	+215	3	Qualified to knockout stage 9th to 16th place		—			
3	Russia [5/8]	4	2	2	11	9	+2	26	21	+5	865	785	+80	2	Qualified to knockout stage 17th to 24th place	2–3	2–3	—	3–2	4–1
4	Canada [9/16]	4	1	3	9	11	−2	21	24	−3	740	818	−78	1	Qualified to knockout stage 25th to 32nd place	1–4	1–4		—	5–0
5	Macau [17/43]	4	0	4	1	19	−18	3	39	−36	483	867	−384	0	Qualified to knockout stage 33rd to 40th	0–5	0–5			—

First match(es) will be played: 30 September 2019. Source: TS

=== Group C ===
==== Group C1 ====
Pos	Team	Pld	W	L	MF	MA	MD	GF	GA	GD	PF	PA	PD	Pts	Qualification	Thailand national badminton team	Belarus national badminton team	Latvia national badminton team
1	Thailand [3/4]	2	2	0	10	0	+10	20	0	+20	420	140	+280	2	Advance to Play-off C1	—	5–0	5–0
2	Belarus [17/43]	2	1	1	5	5	0	10	10	0	295	335	−40	1	Advance to Play-off C2		—	5–0
3	Latvia [17/43]	2	0	2	0	10	−10	0	20	−20	180	420	−240	0	Advance to Play-off C3			—

First match(es) will be played: 30 September 2019. Source: TS

==== Group C2 ====
Pos	Team	Pld	W	L	MF	MA	MD	GF	GA	GD	PF	PA	PD	Pts	Qualification	Switzerland national badminton team	Estonia national badminton team	Mongolia national badminton team
1	Switzerland [9/16]	2	2	0	9	1	+8	18	3	+15	433	261	+172	2	Advance to Play-off C1	—	4–1	5–0
2	Estonia [17/43]	2	1	1	6	4	+2	13	9	+4	392	333	+59	1	Advance to Play-off C2		—	
3	Mongolia [17/43]	2	0	2	0	10	−10	1	20	−19	213	444	−231	0	Advance to Play-off C3		0–5	—

First match(es) will be played: 30 September 2019. Source: TS

==== Group C play-offs ====
Play-off C1
Thailand [3/4]	3
Switzerland [9/16]	0

Play-off C2
Belarus [17/43]	1
Estonia [17/43]	3

Play-off C3
Latvia [17/43]	3
Mongolia [17/43]	1

=== Group D ===
Pos	Team	Pld	W	L	MF	MA	MD	GF	GA	GD	PF	PA	PD	Pts	Qualification	France national badminton team	England national badminton team	Czech Republic national badminton team	Sweden national badminton team	Portugal national badminton team
1	France [9/16]	4	4	0	14	6	+8	33	17	+16	949	813	+136	4	Qualified to knockout stage 1st to 8th	—		3–2	3–2	5–0
2	England [5/8]	4	2	2	13	7	+6	29	20	+9	906	757	+149	2	Qualified to knockout stage 9th to 16th place	2–3	—	2–3	4–1	5–0
3	Czech Republic [17/43]	4	2	2	12	8	+4	27	20	+7	863	824	+39	2	Qualified to knockout stage 17th to 24th place			—	2–3	5–0
4	Sweden [17/43]	4	2	2	11	9	+2	29	22	+7	915	877	+38	2	Qualified to knockout stage 25th to 32nd place				—	5–0
5	Portugal [17/43]	4	0	4	0	20	−20	1	40	−39	496	858	−362	0	Qualified to knockout stage 33rd to 40th					—

First match(es) will be played: 30 September 2019. Source: TS

=== Group E ===
Pos	Team	Pld	W	L	MF	MA	MD	GF	GA	GD	PF	PA	PD	Pts	Qualification	Japan national badminton team	India national badminton team	United States national badminton team	Australia national badminton team	Armenia national badminton team
1	Japan [9/16]	4	4	0	19	1	+18	38	4	+34	876	485	+391	4	Qualified to knockout stage 1st to 8th	—		5–0	5–0	5–0
2	India [5/8]	4	3	1	14	6	+8	30	15	+15	884	655	+229	3	Qualified to knockout stage 9th to 16th place	1–4	—	4–1	4–1	5–0
3	United States [17/43]	4	2	2	10	10	0	23	23	0	805	774	+31	2	Qualified to knockout stage 17th to 24th place			—		
4	Australia [17/43]	4	1	3	7	13	−6	19	28	−9	781	829	−48	1	Qualified to knockout stage 25th to 32nd place			1–4	—	5–0
5	Armenia [17/43]	4	0	4	0	20	−20	0	40	−40	237	840	−603	0	Qualified to knockout stage 33rd to 40th			0–5		—

First match(es) will be played: 30 September 2019. Source: TS

=== Group F ===
Pos	Team	Pld	W	L	MF	MA	MD	GF	GA	GD	PF	PA	PD	Pts	Qualification	South Korea national badminton team	Singapore national badminton team	Slovakia national badminton team	Sri Lanka national badminton team	Peru national badminton team
1	South Korea [3/4]	4	4	0	17	3	+14	35	8	+27	854	581	+273	4	Qualified to knockout stage 1st to 8th	—	3–2	5–0	4–1	5–0
2	Singapore [9/16]	4	3	1	15	5	+10	33	15	+18	958	757	+201	3	Qualified to knockout stage 9th to 16th place		—	4–1	4–1	5–0
3	Slovakia [17/43]	4	2	2	9	11	−2	20	23	−3	730	787	−57	2	Qualified to knockout stage 17th to 24th place			—		4–1
4	Sri Lanka [17/43]	4	1	3	7	13	−6	16	28	−12	699	831	−132	1	Qualified to knockout stage 25th to 32nd place			1–4	—	4–1
5	Peru [17/43]	4	0	4	2	18	−16	6	36	−30	580	865	−285	0	Qualified to knockout stage 33rd to 40th					—

First match(es) will be played: 30 September 2019. Source: TS

=== Group G ===
Pos	Team	Pld	W	L	MF	MA	MD	GF	GA	GD	PF	PA	PD	Pts	Qualification	Denmark national badminton team	Chinese Taipei national badminton team	New Zealand national badminton team	Uzbekistan national badminton team	Faroe Islands national badminton team
1	Denmark [5/8]	4	4	0	18	2	+16	36	7	+29	870	519	+351	4	Qualified to knockout stage 1st to 8th	—	3–2	5–0	5–0	5–0
2	Chinese Taipei [9/16]	4	3	1	17	3	+14	36	6	+30	858	476	+382	3	Qualified to knockout stage 9th to 16th place		—	5–0	5–0	5–0
3	New Zealand [17/43]	4	2	2	10	10	0	21	20	+1	646	710	−64	2	Qualified to knockout stage 17th to 24th place			—		
4	Uzbekistan [17/43]	4	1	3	4	16	−12	8	33	−25	552	802	−250	1	Qualified to knockout stage 25th to 32nd place			0–5	—	4–1
5	Faroe Islands [17/43]	4	0	4	1	19	−18	3	38	−35	438	857	−419	0	Qualified to knockout stage 33rd to 40th			0–5		—

First match(es) will be played: 30 September 2019. Source: TS

=== Group H ===
==== Group H1 ====
Pos	Team	Pld	W	L	MF	MA	MD	GF	GA	GD	PF	PA	PD	Pts	Qualification	China national badminton team	Scotland national badminton team	Norway national badminton team
1	China [2]	2	2	0	10	0	+10	20	0	+20	420	149	+271	2	Advance to Play-off H1	—	5–0	5–0
2	Scotland [17/43]	2	1	1	5	5	0	10	10	0	284	356	−72	1	Advance to Play-off H2		—	5–0
3	Norway [17/43]	2	0	2	0	5	−5	0	20	−20	221	420	−199	0	Advance to Play-off H3			—

First match(es) will be played: 30 September 2019. Source: TS

==== Group H2 ====
Pos	Team	Pld	W	L	MF	MA	MD	GF	GA	GD	PF	PA	PD	Pts	Qualification	Germany national badminton team	Lithuania national badminton team	Iceland national badminton team
1	Germany [9/16]	2	2	0	10	0	+10	20	0	+20	420	204	+216	2	Advance to Play-off H1	—	5–0	5–0
2	Lithuania [17/43]	2	1	1	5	5	0	10	10	0	331	329	+2	1	Advance to Play-off H2		—	
3	Iceland [17/43]	2	0	2	0	10	−10	0	20	−20	202	420	−218	0	Advance to Play-off H3		0–5	—

First match(es) will be played: 30 September 2019. Source: TS

==== Group H play-offs ====
Play-off H1
China [2]	3
Germany [9/16]	0

Play-off H2
Scotland [17/43]	3
Lithuania [17/43]	0

Play-off H3
Norway [17/43]	3
Iceland [17/43]	0

== Final stage ==
=== 1st to 8th ===
5th–6th place match
B	Hong Kong	3
G	Denmark	1
7th–8th place match
D	France	2
F	South Korea	3

5th to 8th semifinals
B	Hong Kong	3
D	France	0
F	South Korea	2
G	Denmark	3

1st to 8th quarterfinals
A	Indonesia	3
B	Hong Kong	0
C	Thailand	3
D	France	0
E	Japan	3
F	South Korea	0
G	Denmark	0
H	China	3

1st to 4th semifinals
A	Indonesia	3
C	Thailand	2
E	Japan	2
H	China	3

Final
A	Indonesia	3
H	China	1
Third place
C	Thailand	np
E	Japan

==== 1st to 8th quarterfinals ====
Indonesia
3
Kazan Gymnastics Center, Court 1
3 October 2019
09:00 UTC+3

Hong Kong
0

			1	2	3
1	(Indonesia) (Hong Kong)	Leo Rolly Carnando / Indah Cahya Sari Jamil; Lui Chun Wai / Yeung Pui Lam	16; 21	21; 13	21; 17
2	(Indonesia) (Hong Kong)	Putri Kusuma Wardani; Happy Serena Cheng Sin Yan	21; 7	21; 18
3	(Indonesia) (Hong Kong)	Christian Adinata; Jason Gunawan	21; 14	21; 23	21; 10
4	(Indonesia) (Hong Kong)	Nita Violina Marwah / Putri Syaikah; Lui Lok Lok / Tsang Hiu Yan				not played
5	(Indonesia) (Hong Kong)	Leo Rolly Carnando / Daniel Marthin; Hung Kuei Chun / Lui Chun Wai				not played

Thailand
3
Kazan Gymnastics Center, Court 2
3 October 2019
09:00 UTC+3

France
0

			1	2	3
1	(Thailand) (France)	Ratchapol Makkasasithorn / Benyapa Aimsaard; Kenji Lovang / Juliette Moinard	21; 14	21; 19
2	(Thailand) (France)	Phittayaporn Chaiwan; Romane Cloteaux-Foucault	21; 8	21; 14
3	(Thailand) (France)	Kunlavut Vitidsarn; Christo Popov	21; 19	21; 8
4	(Thailand) (France)	Benyapa Aimsaard / Pornnicha Suwatnodom; Juliette Moinard / Emilie Vercelot				not played
5	(Thailand) (France)	Thanawin Madee / Ratchapol Makkasasithorn; Kenji Lovang / Christo Popov				not played

Japan
3
Kazan Gymnastics Center, Court 3
3 October 2019
09:00 UTC+3

South Korea
0

			1	2	3
1	(Japan) (South Korea)	Kakeru Kumagai / Atsumi Miyazaki; Jo Seong-min / Kim Yun-ju	21; 11	21; 15
2	(Japan) (South Korea)	Riko Gunji; Seo Bo-hyun	21; 14	21; 15
3	(Japan) (South Korea)	Riki Takei; Kim Byung-jae	21; 16	21; 16
4	(Japan) (South Korea)	Rui Hirokami / Mizuki Otake; Jeong Da-yeon / Kim Ae-lin				not played
5	(Japan) (South Korea)	Takuma Kawamoto / Tsubasa Kawamura; An Yun-seong / Lee Yoo-jun				not played

Denmark
0
Kazan Gymnastics Center, Court 4
3 October 2019
09:00 UTC+3

China
3

			1	2	3
1	(Denmark) (China)	Rasmus Espersen / Christine Busch; Feng Yanzhe / Lin Fangling	13; 21	13; 21
2	(Denmark) (China)	Magnus Johannesen; Liu Liang	21; 18	17; 21	16; 21
3	(Denmark) (China)	Sophia Grundtvig; Zhou Meng	11; 21	11; 21
4	(Denmark) (China)	Marcus Rindshøj / Mads Vestergaard; Di Zijian / Wang Chang
5	(Denmark) (China)	Christine Busch / Amalie Schulz; Li Yijing / Tan Ning

==== 5th to 8th semifinals ====
Hong Kong
3
Kazan Gymnastics Center, Court 5
3 October 2019
17:00 UTC+3

France
0

			1	2	3
1	(Hong Kong) (France)	Lui Chun Wai / Yeung Pui Lam; Nicolas Hoareau / Laeticia Jaffrennou	21; 8	21; 17
2	(Hong Kong) (France)	Happy Serena Cheng Sin Yan; Romane Cloteaux-Foucault	21; 11	21; 14
3	(Hong Kong) (France)	Jason Gunawan; Alex Lanier	21; 10	21; 7
4	(Hong Kong) (France)	Leung Sze Lok / Yeung Pui Lam; Flavie Vallet / Emilie Vercelot				not played
5	(Hong Kong) (France)	Hung Kuei Chun / Lui Chun Wai; Alex Lanier / Lucas Renoir				not played

South Korea
2
Kazan Gymnastics Center, Court 6
3 October 2019
17:00 UTC+3

Denmark
3

			1	2	3
1	(South Korea) (Denmark)	An Yun-seong / Lee Na-rin; Mads Vestergaard / Natasja P. Anthonisen	21; 18	21; 16
2	(South Korea) (Denmark)	Choi Hyo-won; Amalie Schulz	21; 23	19; 21
3	(South Korea) (Denmark)	Lee Yoo-jun; Mads Juel Møller	21; 17	21; 13
4	(South Korea) (Denmark)	Jeong Da-yeon / Kim Ae-lin; Natasja P. Anthonisen / Clara Graversen	16; 21	16; 21
5	(South Korea) (Denmark)	Heo Tae-yoon / Park Seung-min; William Kryger Boe / Mads Vestergaard	16; 21	24; 26

==== 7th–8th place match ====
France
2
Kazan Gymnastics Center, Court 8
4 October 2019
13:00 UTC+3

South Korea
3

			1	2	3
1	(France) (South Korea)	Kenji Lovang / Juliette Moinard; An Yun-seong / Lee Na-rin	21; 15	21; 11
2	(France) (South Korea)	Romane Cloteaux-Foucault; Seo Bo-hyun	15; 21	17; 21
3	(France) (South Korea)	Christo Popov; Kim Tae-rim	21; 19	21; 16
4	(France) (South Korea)	Flavie Vallet / Emilie Vercelot; Jeong Da-yeon / Kim Ae-lin	15; 21	8; 21
5	(France) (South Korea)	Yanis Gaudin / Alex Lanier; Jo Seong-min / Lee Yoo-jun	16; 21	21; 17	7; 21

==== 5th–6th place match ====
Hong Kong
3
Kazan Gymnastics Center, Court 9
4 October 2019
13:00 UTC+3

Denmark
1

			1	2	3
1	(Hong Kong) (Denmark)	Hung Kuei Chun / Tsang Hiu Yan; Marcus Rindshøj / Clara Graversen	21; 15	21; 6
2	(Hong Kong) (Denmark)	Saloni Samirbhai Mehta; Frederikke Lund	16; 21	7; 21
3	(Hong Kong) (Denmark)	Jason Gunawan; Christopher Vittoriani	21; 9	19; 21	21; 9
4	(Hong Kong) (Denmark)	Lui Lok Lok / Tsang Hiu Yan; Natasja P. Anthonisen / Clara Graversen	21; 17	21; 9
5	(Hong Kong) (Denmark)	Jason Gunawan / Hung Kuei Chun; Rasmus Espersen / Marcus Rindshøj				not played

==== 1st to 4th semifinals ====
Indonesia
3
Kazan Gymnastics Center, Court 1
4 October 2019
17:00 UTC+3

Thailand
2

			1	2	3
1	(Indonesia) (Thailand)	Bobby Setiabudi; Kunlavut Vitidsarn	6; 21	22; 20	21; 16
2	(Indonesia) (Thailand)	Putri Kusuma Wardani; Phittayaporn Chaiwan	22; 24	16; 21
3	(Indonesia) (Thailand)	Leo Rolly Carnando / Daniel Marthin; Thanawin Madee / Ratchapol Makkasasithorn	21; 12	22; 20
4	(Indonesia) (Thailand)	Nita Violina Marwah / Putri Syaikah; Benyapa Aimsaard / Pornnicha Suwatnodom	17; 21	21; 15	19; 21
5	(Indonesia) (Thailand)	Daniel Marthin / Indah Cahya Sari Jamil; Kunlavut Vitidsarn / Phittayaporn Chaiwan	21; 10	21; 17

Japan
2
Kazan Gymnastics Center, Court 5
4 October 2019
17:00 UTC+3

China
3

			1	2	3
1	(Japan) (China)	Kakeru Kumagai / Atsumi Miyazaki; Feng Yanzhe / Lin Fangling	6; 21	6; 21
2	(Japan) (China)	Riko Gunji; Zhou Meng	21; 12	21; 15
3	(Japan) (China)	Takuma Kawamoto; Liu Liang	21; 16	14; 21	21; 12
4	(Japan) (China)	Rui Hirokami / Mizuki Otake; Li Yijing / Tan Ning	12; 21	21; 17	23; 25
5	(Japan) (China)	Yoshifumi Fujisawa / Kakeru Kumagai; Di Zijian / Wang Chang	21; 15	18; 21	15; 21

==== Final ====
Indonesia
3
Kazan Gymnastics Center, Court 1
5 October 2019, 13:00 UTC+3

China
1

			1	2	3
1	(Indonesia) (China)	Daniel Marthin / Indah Cahya Sari Jamil; Feng Yanzhe / Lin Fangling	21; 18	18; 21	21; 11
2	(Indonesia) (China)	Putri Kusuma Wardani; Zhou Meng	21; 18	20; 22	21; 14
3	(Indonesia) (China)	Bobby Setiabudi; Liu Liang	17; 21	21; 17	20; 22
4	(Indonesia) (China)	Febriana Dwipuji Kusuma / Putri Syaikah; Li Yijing / Tan Ning	16; 21	25; 23	21; 13
5	(Indonesia) (China)	Leo Rolly Carnando / Daniel Marthin; Di Zijian / Wang Chang				not played

=== 9th to 16th ===
13th–14th place match
A	Spain	0
F	Singapore	3
15th–16th place match
C	Switzerland	0
H	Germany	3

13th to 16th semifinals
A	Spain	3
C	Switzerland	1
F	Singapore	3
H	Germany	1

9th to 16th quarterfinals
A	Spain	0
B	Malaysia	3
C	Switzerland	0
D	England	3
E	India	3
F	Singapore	0
G	Chinese Taipei	3
H	Germany	0

9th to 12th semifinals
B	Malaysia	3
D	England	0
E	India	2
G	Chinese Taipei	3

9th–10th place match
B	Malaysia	3
G	Chinese Taipei	0
11th–12th place match
D	England	3
E	India	2

=== 17th to 24th ===
21st–22nd place match
C	Estonia	3
F	Slovakia	1
23rd–24th place match
A	Hungary	2
G	New Zealand	3

21st to 24th semifinals
A	Hungary	1
C	Estonia	3
F	Slovakia	3
G	New Zealand	0

17th to 24th quarterfinals
A	Hungary	1
B	Russia	3
C	Estonia	0
D	Czech Republic	3
E	United States	3
F	Slovakia	2
G	New Zealand	1
H	Scotland	3

17th to 20th semifinals
B	Russia	0
D	Czech Republic	3
E	United States	3
H	Scotland	1

17th–18th place match
D	Czech Republic	3
E	United States	2
19th–20th place match
B	Russia	3
H	Scotland	1

=== 25th to 32nd ===
29th–30th place match
A	Finland	2
E	Australia	3
31st–32nd place match
C	Belarus	3
G	Uzbekistan	1

29th to 32nd semifinals
A	Finland	3
C	Belarus	1
E	Australia	3
G	Uzbekistan	1

25th to 32nd quarterfinals
A	Finland	1
B	Canada	3
C	Belarus	0
D	Sweden	3
E	Australia	2
F	Sri Lanka	3
G	Uzbekistan	0
H	Lithuania	3

25th to 28th semifinals
B	Canada	3
D	Sweden	0
F	Sri Lanka	3
H	Lithuania	0

25th–26th place match
B	Canada	3
F	Sri Lanka	1
27th–28th place match
D	Sweden	3
H	Lithuania	0

=== 33rd to 40th ===
37th–38th place match
A	Kazakhstan	3
G	Faroe Islands	1
39th–40th place
C	Latvia	3
E	Armenia	0

37th to 40th semifinals
A	Kazakhstan	3
C	Latvia	1
E	Armenia	0
G	Faroe Islands	3

33rd to 40th quarterfinals
A	Kazakhstan	0
B	Macau	3
C	Latvia	0
D	Portugal	3
E	Armenia	0
F	Peru	3
G	Faroe Islands	1
H	Norway	3

33rd to 36th semifinals
A	Macau	2
D	Portugal	3
F	Peru	0
H	Norway	3

33rd–34th place match
D	Portugal	1
H	Norway	3
35th–36th place match
A	Macau	3
F	Peru	2

=== 41st to 43rd ===
Pos	Team	Pld	W	L	MF	MA	MD	GF	GA	GD	PF	PA	PD	Pts	Uganda	Iceland	Mongolia
1	Uganda	2	2	0	7	3	+4	15	7	+8	425	327	+98	2	—	3–2	4–1
2	Iceland	2	1	1	6	4	+2	13	11	+2	418	416	+2	1		—	1–4
3	Mongolia	2	0	2	2	8	−6	6	16	−10	314	414	−100	0			—

First match(es) will be played: 2 October 2019. Source: TS

== Final standings ==
1. Indonesia
2. China
3. Thailand
3. Japan
5. Hong Kong
6. Denmark
7. South Korea
8. France
9. Malaysia
10. Chinese Taipei
11. England
12. India
13. Singapore
14. Spain
15. Germany
16. Switzerland (Debut)
17. Czech Republic
18. United States
19. Russia
20. Scotland
21. Estonia
22. Slovakia
23. New Zealand
24. Hungary
25. Canada
26. Sri Lanka
27. Sweden
28. Lithuania
29. Australia
30. Finland
31. Belarus
32. Uzbekistan
33. Norway
34. Portugal
35. Macau
36. Peru
37. Kazakhstan (Debut)
38. Faroe Islands
39. Latvia
40. Armenia
41. Uganda
42. Iceland
43. Mongolia
