= Christian Adinata =

Indonesian badminton player (born 2001)

Personal information
- Born: 16 June 2001 (age 25) Pati, Central Java, Indonesia
- Height: 1.83 m (6 ft 0 in)

Sport
- Country: Indonesia
- Sport: Badminton
- Handedness: Right

Men's singles
- Highest ranking: 37 (30 May 2023)
- Current ranking: 90 (7 April 2026)
- BWF profile
Medal record
Men's badminton
Representing Indonesia
Asia Team Championships
Silver medal – second place	2022 Selangor	Men's team
SEA Games
Gold medal – first place	2023 Cambodia	Men's team
Gold medal – first place	2023 Cambodia	Men's singles
Bronze medal – third place	2021 Vietnam	Men's team
World Junior Championships
Gold medal – first place	2019 Kazan	Mixed team
Bronze medal – third place	2018 Markham	Mixed team
Asian Junior Championships
Silver medal – second place	2019 Suzhou	Mixed team

Christian Adinata (born 16 June 2001) is an Indonesian badminton player. Born in Pati, Adinata started his career at the Tangkas Intiland club. In 2021, he was selected to join the senior national team.

== Career ==
=== 2019 ===
In October, Adinata won gold in the mixed team event of the World Junior Championships in Kazan, Russia. In the individual event, he was seeded eighth in the boys' singles and finished in the fourth round.

=== 2022 ===
In April, Adinata reached the semi-finals of Orléans Masters after going from qualification. In May, he won a bronze medal in the men's team at the SEA Games.

In June, Adinata won his first senior title at the Italian International. In July, he competed at the Taipei Open but lost in the qualifying round. In October, he competed at the home tournament, Indonesia Masters Super 100 but lost in the quarter-finals from Taiwanese player Lee Chia-hao. In November, he lost in the second round of the Australian Open from Japanese player Kodai Naraoka.

=== 2023 ===
Adinata started the season in the Indonesia Masters, but lost in the first round against Kenta Nishimoto in rubber games. In the next tournament, he lost in the second round of the Thailand Masters to Lin Chun-yi of Chinese Taipei.

In March, Adinata competed at the Spain Masters, but lost in the second round against 6th seed Rasmus Gemke. He then played at the Orléans Masters, and beating the defending champion Toma Junior Popov in the first round, but lost in the second round to Magnus Johannesen.

In May, Adinata represented Indonesia at the SEA Games in Cambodia, and won the gold medals in the men's team and singles events. Adinata then reached the Malaysia Masters semi-finals, but had to retired in the match against Prannoy H. S. following a knee injury.

== Achievements ==
=== SEA Games ===
Men's singles
Year	Venue	Opponent	Score	Result	Ref.
2023	Morodok Techo Badminton Hall; Phnom Penh, Cambodia	(Indonesia) Chico Aura Dwi Wardoyo	21–12, 18–21, 21–18	Gold	

=== BWF International Challenge/Series (2 titles, 2 runners-up) ===
Men's singles
Year	Tournament	Opponent	Score	Result	Ref.
2022	Italian International	(Denmark) Magnus Johannesen	21–16, 21–15	(gold) Winner	
2025	Thailand International Series	(Indonesia) Richie Duta Richardo	21–14, 21–19	(gold) Winner	
2025	Thailand International Challenge	(Indonesia) Richie Duta Richardo	10–21, 9–21	(silver) Runner-up	
2025	Malaysia International Series	(South Korea) Park Sang-yong	23–25, 22–20, 12–21	(silver) Runner-up	

BWF International Challenge tournament
BWF International Series tournament
BWF Future Series tournament

=== BWF Junior International (2 runners-up) ===
Boys' singles
Year	Tournament	Opponent	Score	Result	Ref.
2018	India Junior International	(Indonesia) Ikhsan Rumbay	14–21, 13–21	(silver) Runner-up	
2019	Dutch Junior International	(China) Liu Liang	14–21, 21–13, 17–21	(silver) Runner-up	

BWF Junior International Grand Prix tournament
BWF Junior International Challenge tournament
BWF Junior International Series tournament
BWF Junior Future Series tournament

== Performance timeline ==
Key

W	Won	F	Finalist	SF	Semi-finalist
QF	Quarter-finalist	#R	Rounds 4, 3, 2, 1	RR	Round-robin stage
Q#	Qualification round	A	Absent	w/d	Withdrew
G	Gold	S	Silver	B	Bronze
NH	Not held	N/A	Not applicable	DNQ	Did not qualify

=== National team ===
- Junior level

Team events	2018	2019
Asian Junior Championships	A	S
World Junior Championships	B	G

- Senior level

Team events	2021	2022	2023	Ref
SEA Games	B	NH	G	
Asia Team Championships	NH	S	NH	

=== Individual competitions ===
- Junior level

Events	2018	2019
Asian Junior Championships	QF	2R
World Junior Championships	4R	4R

- Senior level

Events	2021	2022	2023	Ref
SEA Games	1R	NH	G	

Tournament	BWF World Tour									Best	Ref
Tournament	2018	2019	2020	2021	2022	2023	2024	2025	2026	Best	Ref
Indonesia Masters	A					1R	A			1R ('23)	
Thailand Masters	A			NH	NA	2R	A			2R ('23)	
Ruichang China Masters	A		NH			w/d	A		1R	1R ('26)	
Orléans Masters	A		NH	A	SF	2R	A			SF ('22)	
Baoji China Masters	NA						A		1R	1R ('26)	
Malaysia Masters	A			NH	A	SF	A			SF ('23)	
Australian Open	A		NH		2R	A				2R ('22)	
Macau Open	A		NH				A		Q2	Q2 ('26)	
Taipei Open	A		NH		Q1	A				Q1 ('22)	
Indonesia Masters Super 100	Q2	A	NH		QF	A			1R	QF ('22, '25 II)	
Indonesia Masters Super 100	Q2	A	NH		QF	A		QF	2R	QF ('22, '25 II)	
Malaysia Super 100	N/A					A			1R	1R ('26)	
Spain Masters	A				NH	2R	A	NH		2R ('23)	
Year-end ranking	350	234	247	196	83	108	468	98		37	
Tournament	2018	2019	2020	2021	2022	2023	2024	2025	2026	Best	Ref
