= Bobby Setiabudi =

Indonesian badminton player (born 2001)

Personal information
- Born: 22 March 2001 (age 25) Situbondo, East Java, Indonesia

Sport
- Country: Indonesia
- Sport: Badminton
- Handedness: Right

Men's singles & mixed doubles
- Highest ranking: 126 (MS, 4 May 2023); 33 (XD with Melati Daeva Oktavianti, 3 February 2026)
- Current ranking: 40 (XD with Melati Daeva Oktavianti, 7 July 2026)
- BWF profile
Medal record
Men's badminton
Representing Indonesia
SEA Games
Bronze medal – third place	2021 Vietnam	Men's team
World Junior Championships
Gold medal – first place	2019 Kazan	Mixed team
Asian Junior Championships
Silver medal – second place	2019 Suzhou	Mixed team

Bobby Setiabudi (born 22 March 2001) is an Indonesian badminton player affiliated with Djarum club. He was part of the national junior team that won the first Suhandinata Cup for Indonesia in 2019 BWF World Junior Championships.

== Achievements ==
=== BWF World Tour (1 runner-up) ===
The BWF World Tour, which was announced on 19 March 2017 and implemented in 2018, is a series of elite badminton tournaments sanctioned by the Badminton World Federation (BWF). The BWF World Tour is divided into levels of World Tour Finals, Super 1000, Super 750, Super 500, Super 300, and the BWF Tour Super 100.

Mixed doubles
Year	Tournament	Level	Partner	Opponent	Score	Result	Ref.
2026	Thailand Masters	Super 300	(Indonesia) Melati Daeva Oktavianti	(Indonesia) Adnan Maulana (Indonesia) Indah Cahya Sari Jamil	21–18, 19–21, 17–21	(silver) Runner-up	

=== BWF International Challenge/Series (5 titles) ===
Men's singles
Year	Tournament	Opponent	Score	Result	Ref.
2021	Bahrain International	(Hong Kong) Chan Yin Chak	21–18, 11–21, 21–16	(gold) Winner	

Mixed doubles
Year	Tournament	Partner	Opponent	Score	Result	Ref.
2025	Singapore International	(Indonesia) Melati Daeva Oktavianti	(Thailand) Phuwanat Horbanluekit (Thailand) Fungfa Korpthammakit	21–19, 21–16	(gold) Winner	
2025	Sri Lanka International	(Indonesia) Melati Daeva Oktavianti	(Japan) Yuta Watanabe (Japan) Maya Taguchi	16–21, 21–14, 21–18	(gold) Winner	
2025 (I)	Indonesia International	(Indonesia) Melati Daeva Oktavianti	(Indonesia) Renaldi Samosir (Indonesia) Masita Mahmudin	17–21, 21–11, 21–16	(gold) Winner	
2025 (II)	Indonesia International	(Indonesia) Melati Daeva Oktavianti	(Indonesia) Renaldi Samosir (Indonesia) Masita Mahmudin	21–8, 12–21, 21–12	(gold) Winner	

BWF International Challenge tournament
BWF International Series tournament
BWF Future Series tournament

=== BWF Junior International (1 title, 3 runners-up) ===
Boys' singles
Year	Tournament	Opponent	Score	Result
2018	Jakarta Open Junior International	(Indonesia) Karono	15–21, 8–21	(silver) Runner-up
2019	Banthongyord Junior International	(Thailand) Kunlavut Vitidsarn	16–21, 24–26	(silver) Runner-up
2019	Jaya Raya Junior Grand Prix	(China) Li Yunze	18–21, 22–24	(silver) Runner-up
2019	Malaysia Junior International	(Indonesia) Yonathan Ramlie	22–20, 21–16	(gold) Winner

BWF Junior International Grand Prix tournament
BWF Junior International Challenge tournament
BWF Junior International Series tournament
BWF Junior Future Series tournament

== Performance timeline ==
Key

W	Won	F	Finalist	SF	Semi-finalist
QF	Quarter-finalist	#R	Rounds 4, 3, 2, 1	RR	Round-robin stage
Q#	Qualification round	A	Absent	w/d	Withdrew
G	Gold	S	Silver	B	Bronze
NH	Not held	N/A	Not applicable	DNQ	Did not qualify

=== National team ===
- Junior level

Team events	2019
Asian Junior Championships	S
World Junior Championships	G

- Senior level

Team events	2022
SEA Games	B

=== Individual competitions ===
==== Junior level ====
Team events	2019
Asian Junior Championships	3R
World Junior Championships	QF

==== Senior level ====
===== Men's singles =====
Tournament	BWF World Tour						Best	Ref
Tournament	2018	2019	2020	2021	2022	2023	Best	Ref
Indonesia Masters Super 100	Q2	A	NH		3R	1R	3R ('22)	
Year-end ranking	872	333	380	292	166	305	126	

===== Mixed doubles =====
Event	2026	Ref
Asian Championships	1R	

Tournament	BWF World Tour			Best	Ref
Tournament	2024	2025	2026	Best	Ref
Indonesia Masters	A		1R	1R ('26)	
Thailand Masters	A		F	F ('26)	
Ruichang China Masters	1R	A		1R ('24)	
Baoji China Masters	A	QF	A	QF ('25)	
Thailand Open	A	1R	1R	1R ('25, '26)	
Malaysia Masters	A		2R	2R ('26)	
Singapore Open	A		1R	1R ('26)	
Indonesia Open	A		1R	1R ('26)	
Macau Open	A	1R	A	1R ('25)	
Taipei Open	A	QF	A	QF ('25)	
Indonesia Masters Super 100	A	SF	A	SF ('25 I, '25 II)	
Indonesia Masters Super 100	2R	SF		SF ('25 I, '25 II)	
Vietnam Open	A	2R	A	2R ('25)	
Malaysia Super 100	QF	A		QF ('24)	
Year-end ranking	94	39		33	
