= Kunlavut Vitidsarn =

Thai badminton player (born 2001)

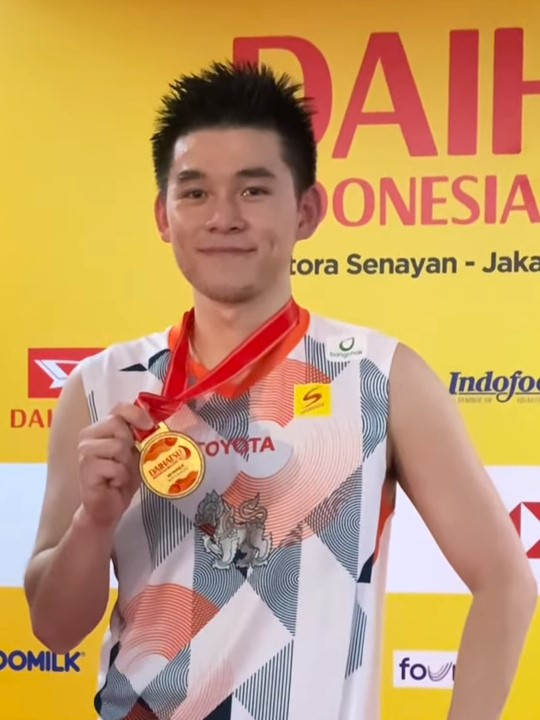
- Kunlavut at the 2025 Indonesia Masters

Personal information
- Nicknames: View; Three-Game God
- Born: 11 May 2001 (age 25) Chonburi, Thailand
- Height: 1.77 m (5 ft 10 in)
- Weight: 85 kg (187 lb)

Sport
- Country: Thailand
- Sport: Badminton
- Handedness: Right
- Coached by: Patapol Ngernsrisuk

Men's singles
- Career record: 284 wins, 117 losses
- Highest ranking: 1 (3 June 2025)
- Current ranking: 2 (27 October 2026)
- BWF profile
Medal record
Men's badminton
Representing Thailand
Olympic Games
| Silver medal – second place | 2024 Paris | Men's singles |
World Championships
| Gold medal – first place | 2023 Copenhagen | Men's singles |
| Silver medal – second place | 2022 Tokyo | Men's singles |
| Silver medal – second place | 2025 Paris | Men's singles |
Asian Games
| Gold medal – first place | 2026 Aichi–Nagoya | Men's singles |
| Bronze medal – third place | 2026 Aichi–Nagoya | Men's team |
Asian Championships
| Gold medal – first place | 2025 Ningbo | Men's singles |
| Bronze medal – third place | 2026 Ningbo | Men's singles |
SEA Games
| Gold medal – first place | 2021 Vietnam | Men's singles |
| Gold medal – first place | 2021 Vietnam | Men's team |
| Bronze medal – third place | 2025 Thailand | Men's team |
World Junior Championships
| Gold medal – first place | 2017 Yogyakarta | Boys' singles |
| Gold medal – first place | 2018 Markham | Boys' singles |
| Gold medal – first place | 2019 Kazan | Boys' singles |
| Bronze medal – third place | 2016 Bilbao | Mixed team |
| Bronze medal – third place | 2019 Kazan | Mixed team |
Asian Junior Championships
| Gold medal – first place | 2019 Suzhou | Boys' singles |
| Gold medal – first place | 2019 Suzhou | Mixed team |
| Silver medal – second place | 2018 Jakarta | Boys' singles |
| Bronze medal – third place | 2017 Jakarta | Boys' singles |
Representing (International Olympic Committee) Mixed-NOCs
Youth Olympic Games
| Silver medal – second place | 2018 Buenos Aires | Mixed team |

Kunlavut Vitidsarn (Thai: กุลวุฒิ วิทิตศานต์; RTGS: Kunlawut Withitsan; pronounced [kūn.lā.wút̚ wí.tʰít̚.sǎːn]; born 11 May 2001), simply known as View (Thai: วิว; pronounced [wīw]) is a Thai badminton player who became the first Thai player to achieve a BWF ranking of No.1 and win the World Championships in the men's singles category. He won Asia men's singles champions at the 2025 Asian Championships, as well a silver medalist in the 2024 Olympic Games. He was also three-times World Junior champion, winning in 2017, 2018 and 2019. He is nicknamed the "Three-Game God" because his defensive style generally requires him to play three games long and likely to win in the end due to opponent's stamina loss.

Kunlavut became the first men's singles player to win three World Junior Championships titles, joining Ratchanok Intanon and Chen Qingchen as a three-time winner of the World Junior title in the same discipline. He claimed the gold medal at the Asian Junior Championships in 2019, where he previously won a silver in 2018 and bronze in 2017. Kunlavut participated at the 2018 Summer Youth Olympics, and was part of the team Omega took the silver medal in the mixed team event. He was named the 2020/2021 Eddy Choong Most Promising Player.

In the senior category, Kunlavut won the silver medal at the 2022 World Championships and, in the following year, the gold medal at the 2023 World Championships. He became the first Thai player to win the World Championships title in the men's singles category. Kunlavut clinched the gold medal at the 2021 SEA Games and 2025 Asian Championships. He reached a career high of world number 1 in May 2025.

== Personal life ==
Kunlavut was born in Chonburi. He has a younger sister, Sarunrak, who is also a badminton player and won the bronze medal at the 2024 BWF World Junior Championships.

On 26 September 2025, Kunlavut promoted to the rank of police sub-lieutenant.

== Career ==
=== 2016–2019: Asian Junior champion and thrice World Junior champions ===
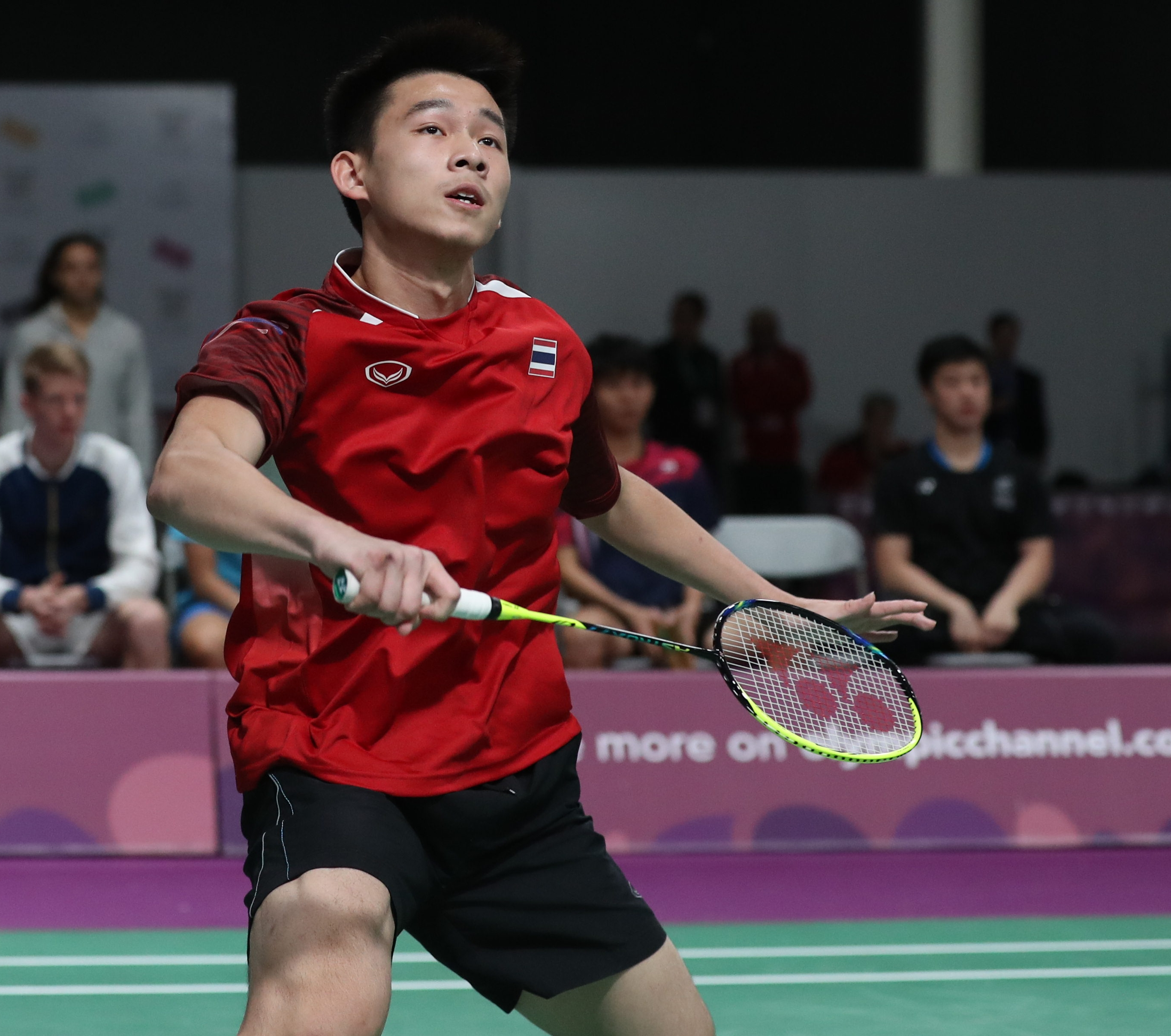
Kunlavut at the 2018 Summer Youth Olympics

Kunlavut exhibited promising performances throughout his junior-level tournament. He won junior tournaments including the boys' singles title in the Banthongyord Junior International and Singapore Youth International, and also the Junior Grand Prix title in Jaya Raya (Indonesia) and India in 2017. In the same year, he won the bronze medal at the Asian Junior Championships. He followed up his impressive showing in the World Junior Championships with a gold medal win.

In 2018, Kunlavut won three Junior Grand Prix title in the Netherlands, Germany, and Indonesia. He managed to defend his title in the Banthongyord Junior International and double the title by winning the mixed doubles with Phittayaporn Chaiwan. He then upgraded his medal in the Asian Junior Championships to silver, losing the finals to Lakshya Sen. However, he managed to defend his World Junior titles. He competed in the Summer Youth Olympics in Argentina, managed to bring the silver medal in the mixed team event together with Omega team. Even though he is only 17 years old, Kunlavut has been able to compete in senior tournaments, as proven by his achievement as he finished as finalists in the India International then won the Nepal International.

In his final year in the junior circuit in 2019, Kunlavut managed to win double title and defend his boys' singles and mixed doubles title in the Banthongyord Junior International. He finally won a gold medal at the Asian Junior Championships, becoming the first ever Thai to win the boys' singles title, and addition a gold in the team event. Kunlavut successfully defended his World Junior Champions title for the third time, became the first men's singles player to win three World Junior Championships titles, joining Ratchanok Intanon and Chen Qingchen as a three-time winner of the World Junior title in the same discipline. He also won four International Challenge title in Iran Fajr International, Polish Open, Finnish Open, and Spanish International.

=== 2020–2022: World Championship silver medalist ===
Kunlavut began the 2020 season as semi-finalist in the Thailand Masters. He then entered the finals of the Spain Masters losing to Viktor Axelsen. In his debut at the All England Open, he was stopped in the first round to Lin Dan in rubber games. Due to the COVID-19 pandemic, numerous tournaments on the 2020 BWF World Tour were either cancelled or rescheduled for later in the year. He played at the Super 1000 Yonex and Toyota Thailand Open but was eliminated in the second round in both tournaments. His best result in 2021 was being one of the finalists in the Swiss Open and in the Indonesia badminton festival the World Tour Finals, where he was defeated by Axelsen.

In 2022, Kunlavut won his first title of the year in the German Open. At the 2021 SEA Games, he won two gold medals in both the singles and team events. Competed as the seed 16, Kunlavut claimed the silver medal in the World Championships, where in the finals he lost to Axelesen in straight game.

=== 2023: World Championships title, world number 3 ===
A good start in the 2023 season was shown by Kunlavut by becoming semi-finalists in the Malaysia Open losing the match to Kodai Naraoka in a close rubber game lasting for an hour 53-minutes. He then beat the current world number 1 Viktor Axelsen to claim his first title of the year in the India Open. He then became the fourth Thai men's singles player to win the home soil title, the Thailand Open in early June. In the following week, he suffered an injury during the semi-finals in the Singapore Open against Anthony Sinisuka Ginting. In July, he finished runner-up in the U.S. Open. Kunlavut's finest hour in his career came at the 2023 World Championships. In the final, he prevailed as he defeated Naraoka in a rubber game to win the gold medal, and achieved his highest BWF world ranking of third in the men's singles category. His victory at the World Championships, making him Thailand's third gold medal winner during the World Championships since it was first held in 1977. Kunlavut competed in the Hangzhou 2022 Asian Games, but failed to win medal both in the team and individual event. He qualified to compete at the World Tour Finals as the World Champions, but was eliminated in the group stage. He closed the year as world number 7.

=== 2024: Olympic silver ===
Kunlavut achieved a significant milestone by winning a silver medal at the Paris 2024 Olympics, after advancing to the final by defeating world number one Shi Yuqi of China in the quarterfinals and Lee Zii Jia in the semifinals. He was ultimately bested by Denmark's Viktor Axelsen in the gold medal match. His silver medal made him the first Thai athlete to earn an olympic medal in badminton. In the BWF World Tour, his best results was being finalist in the French Open.

=== 2025: Asian Championships title and world number 1 ===
A good start shown by Kunlavut in the beginning of the 2025 BWF World Tour, when he reached the quarter-finals at the Malaysia Open. Despite an early loss at the India Open, he went on to win the Indonesia Masters. In April, Kunlavut beat Lu Guangzu in the Asian Championships and become the first ever men's singles title winner from Thailand. He then reached a peak ranking of number 2 in the BWF World rankings released on 15 April 2025. Kunlavut solidify his form by winning his home tournament, Thailand Open in his favoured three games match against Anders Antonsen. In June, Kunlavut won the Singapore Open in dominating fashion against Lu Guangzu. His excellent performance in Singapore Open shot himself up into the number one in men's singles ranking, thus becoming the first Thais ever to achieve such honour in the history. Later in the year, Kunlavut lost in the final of Arctic Open to Chou Tien-chen.

=== 2026 ===
Kunlavut started the season by winning the Malaysia Open in straight games against Shi Yuqi who had to retired due to the right shoulder injury. He became the first Thai player to win the Malaysia Open in 68 years. In April, Kunlavut was on a mission to defend his Asian Championship but lost out to Ayush Shetty in three games.

== Achievements ==
=== Olympic Games ===
Men's singles
| Year | Venue | Opponent | Score | Result | Ref. |
|---|---|---|---|---|---|
| 2024 | Porte de La Chapelle Arena, Paris, France | (Denmark) Viktor Axelsen | 11–21, 11–21 | Silver | |

=== BWF World Championships ===
Men's singles
| Year | Venue | Opponent | Score | Result | Ref. |
|---|---|---|---|---|---|
| 2022 | Tokyo Metropolitan Gymnasium, Tokyo, Japan | (Denmark) Viktor Axelsen | 5–21, 16–21 | Silver | |
| 2023 | Royal Arena, Copenhagen, Denmark | (Japan) Kodai Naraoka | 19–21, 21–18, 21–7 | Gold | |
| 2025 | Adidas Arena, Paris, France | (China) Shi Yuqi | 21–19, 10–21, 18–21 | Silver | |

=== Asian Games ===
Men's singles
| Year | Venue | Opponent | Score | Result | Ref. |
|---|---|---|---|---|---|
| 2026 | Ichinomiya City Municipal Gymnasium, Ichinomiya, Japan | (Singapore) Loh Kean Yew | 21–12, 21–16 | Gold | |

=== Asian Championships ===
Men's singles
| Year | Venue | Opponent | Score | Result | Ref. |
|---|---|---|---|---|---|
| 2025 | Ningbo Olympic Sports Center Gymnasium, Ningbo, China | (China) Lu Guangzu | 21–12, 11–6 ret. | Gold | |
| 2026 | Ningbo Olympic Sports Center Gymnasium, Ningbo, China | (India) Ayush Shetty | 21–10, 19–21, 17–21 | Bronze | |

=== Southeast Asian Games ===
Men's singles
| Year | Venue | Opponent | Score | Result | Ref. |
|---|---|---|---|---|---|
| 2021 | Bac Giang Gymnasium, Bắc Giang, Vietnam | (Singapore) Loh Kean Yew | 21–13, 21–13 | Gold | |

=== BWF World Junior Championships ===
Boys' singles
| Year | Venue | Opponent | Score | Result | Ref. |
|---|---|---|---|---|---|
| 2017 | Among Rogo Sports Hall, Yogyakarta, Indonesia | (Malaysia) Leong Jun Hao | 17–21, 21–15, 21–9 | Gold | |
| 2018 | Markham Pan Am Centre, Markham, Canada | (Japan) Kodai Naraoka | 21–9, 21–11 | Gold | |
| 2019 | Kazan Gymnastics Center, Kazan, Russia | (France) Christo Popov | 21–8, 21–11 | Gold | |

=== Asian Junior Championships ===
Boys' singles
| Year | Venue | Opponent | Score | Result | Ref. |
|---|---|---|---|---|---|
| 2017 | Jaya Raya Sports Hall Training Center, Jakarta, Indonesia | (Malaysia) Leong Jun Hao | 21–19, 14–21, 21–23 | Bronze | |
| 2018 | Jaya Raya Sports Hall Training Center, Jakarta, Indonesia | (India) Lakshya Sen | 19–21, 18–21 | Silver | |
| 2019 | Suzhou Olympic Sports Centre, Suzhou, China | (China) Liu Liang | 21–14, 21–13 | Gold | |

=== BWF World Tour (8 titles, 8 runners-up) ===
The BWF World Tour, which was announced on 19 March 2017 and implemented in 2018, is a series of elite badminton tournaments sanctioned by the Badminton World Federation (BWF). The BWF World Tour is divided into levels of World Tour Finals, Super 1000, Super 750, Super 500, Super 300, and the BWF Tour Super 100.

Men's singles
| Year | Tournament | Level | Opponent | Score | Result | Ref. |
|---|---|---|---|---|---|---|
| 2020 | Spain Masters | Super 300 | (Denmark) Viktor Axelsen | 16–21, 13–21 | (silver) Runner-up | |
| 2021 | Swiss Open | Super 300 | (Denmark) Viktor Axelsen | 16–21, 6–21 | (silver) Runner-up | |
| 2021 | BWF World Tour Finals | World Tour Finals | (Denmark) Viktor Axelsen | 12–21, 8–21 | (silver) Runner-up | |
| 2022 | German Open | Super 300 | (India) Lakshya Sen | 21–18, 21–15 | (gold) Winner | |
| 2023 | India Open | Super 750 | (Denmark) Viktor Axelsen | 22–20, 10–21, 21–12 | (gold) Winner | |
| 2023 | Thailand Open | Super 500 | (Hong Kong) Lee Cheuk Yiu | 21–12, 21–10 | (gold) Winner | |
| 2023 | U.S. Open | Super 300 | (China) Li Shifeng | 15–21, 18–21 | (silver) Runner-up | |
| 2024 | French Open | Super 750 | (China) Shi Yuqi | 20–22, 19–21 | (silver) Runner-up | |
| 2024 | Korea Masters | Super 300 | (China) Wang Zhengxing | 21–18, 21–18 | (gold) Winner | |
| 2025 | Indonesia Masters | Super 500 | (Indonesia) Jonatan Christie | 18–21, 21–17, 21–18 | (gold) Winner | |
| 2025 | Thailand Open | Super 500 | (Denmark) Anders Antonsen | 21–16, 17–21, 21–9 | (gold) Winner | |
| 2025 | Singapore Open | Super 750 | (China) Lu Guangzu | 21–6, 21–10 | (gold) Winner | |
| 2025 | Arctic Open | Super 500 | (Chinese Taipei) Chou Tien-chen | 11–21, 21–13, 19–21 | (silver) Runner-up | |
| 2026 | Malaysia Open | Super 1000 | (China) Shi Yuqi | 23–21, 6–1 retired | (gold) Winner | |
| 2026 | Thailand Open | Super 500 | (Denmark) Anders Antonsen | 21–9, 22–24, 18–21 | (silver) Runner-up | |
| 2026 | Hong Kong Open | Super 500 | (Denmark) Anders Antonsen | walkover | (silver) Runner-up | |

=== BWF International Challenge/Series (5 titles, 2 runners-up) ===
Men's singles
| Year | Tournament | Opponent | Score | Result | Ref. |
|---|---|---|---|---|---|
| 2018 | India International | (India) Lakshya Sen | 15–21, 10–21 | (silver) Runner-up | |
| 2018 | Nepal International | (Malaysia) Soo Teck Zhi | 20–22, 22–20, 21–9 | (gold) Winner | |
| 2019 | Iran Fajr International | (China) Li Shifeng | 21–18, 21–17 | (gold) Winner | |
| 2019 | Polish Open | (India) Lakshya Sen | 21–17, 21–14 | (gold) Winner | |
| 2019 | Finnish Open | (Chinese Taipei) Lin Chun-yi | 21–16, 18–21, 21–14 | (gold) Winner | |
| 2019 | Spanish International | (England) Toby Penty | 21–14, 21–14 | (gold) Winner | |
| 2019 | Mongolia International | (Japan) Kodai Naraoka | 21–9, 17–21, 21–23 | (silver) Runner-up | |

BWF International Challenge tournament
BWF International Series tournament
BWF Future Series tournament

=== BWF Junior International (11 titles, 2 runners-up) ===
Boys' singles
| Year | Tournament | Opponent | Score | Result | Ref. |
|---|---|---|---|---|---|
| 2017 | Banthongyord Junior International | (Malaysia) Fong Hau Sim | 21–14, 21–13 | (gold) Winner | |
| 2017 | Jaya Raya Junior International | (Indonesia) Ikhsan Rumbay | 21–17, 21–7 | (gold) Winner | |
| 2017 | India Junior International | (India) B. M. Rahul Bharadwaj | 21–16, 21–11 | (gold) Winner | |
| 2017 | Singapore Youth International | (Singapore) Joel Koh | 21–13, 21–13 | (gold) Winner | |
| 2018 | Dutch Junior International | (China) Li Shifeng | 21–18, 21–14 | (gold) Winner | |
| 2018 | German Junior International | (China) Li Shifeng | 21–15, 21–11 | (gold) Winner | |
| 2018 | Jaya Raya Junior International | (Indonesia) Ikhsan Rumbay | 21–14, 21–9 | (gold) Winner | |
| 2018 | Banthongyord Junior International | (Singapore) Jason Teh | 21–16, 21–15 | (gold) Winner | |
| 2019 | Banthongyord Junior International | (Indonesia) Bobby Setiabudi | 21–16, 26–24 | (gold) Winner | |

Boys' doubles
| Year | Tournament | Partner | Opponent | Score | Result | Ref. |
|---|---|---|---|---|---|---|
| 2015 | White Nights Junior International | (Thailand) Pacharapol Nipornram | (Russia) Rodion Alimov (Russia) Pavel Kotsarenko | 21–14, 21–23, 13–21 | (silver) Runner-up | |
| 2017 | India Junior International | (Thailand) Pacharapol Nipornram | (Indonesia) Rehan Naufal Kusharjanto (Indonesia) Rinov Rivaldy | 9–21, 13–21 | (silver) Runner-up | |

Mixed doubles
| Year | Tournament | Partner | Opponent | Score | Result | Ref. |
|---|---|---|---|---|---|---|
| 2018 | Banthongyord Junior International | (Thailand) Phittayaporn Chaiwan | (Japan) Hiroki Midorikawa (Japan) Natsu Saito | 23–21, 21–18 | (gold) Winner | |
| 2019 | Banthongyord Junior International | (Thailand) Phittayaporn Chaiwan | (China) Di Zijian (China) Li Yijing | 21–11, 21–17 | (gold) Winner | |

BWF Junior International Grand Prix tournament
BWF Junior International Challenge tournament
BWF Junior International Series tournament
BWF Junior Future Series tournament

== Performance timeline ==
Key

| W | Won | F | Finalist | SF | Semi-finalist |
| QF | Quarter-finalist | #R | Rounds 4, 3, 2, 1 | RR | Round-robin stage |
| Q# | Qualification round | A | Absent | w/d | Withdrew |
| G | Gold | S | Silver | B | Bronze |
| NH | Not held | N/A | Not applicable | DNQ | Did not qualify |

=== National team ===
- Junior level

| Team events | 2017 | 2018 | 2019 | Ref |
|---|---|---|---|---|
| Asian Junior Championships | QF | QF | G | |
| World Junior Championships | 7th | 9th | B | |

- Senior level

| Team events | 2017 | 2018 | 2019 | 2020 | 2021 | 2022 | 2023 | 2024 | 2025 | 2026 | Ref |
|---|---|---|---|---|---|---|---|---|---|---|---|
| SEA Games | A | NH | A | NH | G | NH | A | NH | B | NH | |
| Asia Team Championships | NH | A | NH | QF | NH | A | NH | A | NH | A | |
| Asia Mixed Team Championships | A | | A | NH | | | A | NH | A | NH | |
| Asian Games | NH | A | NH | | | 1R | NH | | | B | |
| Thomas Cup | NH | RR | NH | QF | NH | RR | NH | RR | NH | | |
| Sudirman Cup | A | NH | A | NH | QF | NH | QF | NH | QF | NH | |

=== Individual competitions ===
- Junior level

| Events | 2016 | 2017 | 2018 | 2019 | Ref |
|---|---|---|---|---|---|
| Asian Junior Championships | A | B | S | G | |
| World Junior Championships | 4R | G | G | G | |

- Senior level

| Events | 2017 | 2018 | 2019 | 2020 | 2021 | 2022 | 2023 | 2024 | 2025 | 2026 | Ref |
|---|---|---|---|---|---|---|---|---|---|---|---|
| SEA Games | A | NH | A | NH | G | NH | A | NH | A | NH | |
| Asian Championships | A | | | NH | | A | 2R | QF | G | B | |
| Asian Games | NH | A | NH | | | 3R | NH | | | G | |
| World Championships | DNQ | | | NH | 1R | S | G | NH | S | QF | |
| Olympic Games | NH | | | DNQ | NH | | | S | NH | | |

| Tournament | BWF SS / GP | | | BWF World Tour | | | | | | | | | Best | Ref |
| Tournament | 2015 | 2016 | 2017 | 2018 | 2019 | 2020 | 2021 | 2022 | 2023 | 2024 | 2025 | 2026 | Best | Ref |
|---|---|---|---|---|---|---|---|---|---|---|---|---|---|---|
| Malaysia Open | A | | | | | NH | | SF | SF | 2R | QF | W | W ('26) | |
| India Open | A | | | | | NH | | A | W | 2R | 1R | QF | W ('23) | |
| Indonesia Masters | A | | NH | A | | | QF | 1R | A | SF | W | w/d | W ('25) | |
| Thailand Masters | NH | A | 2R | A | 1R | SF | NH | | A | | w/d | A | SF ('20) | |
| German Open | A | | | | | NH | | W | 1R | A | | | W ('22) | |
| All England Open | A | | | | | 1R | 1R | 2R | 2R | 2R | 2R | SF | SF ('26) | |
| Swiss Open | A | | | | | NH | F | A | | | QF | A | F ('21) | |
| Orléans Masters | N/A | | | A | 3R | NH | SF | A | | | | | SF ('21) | |
| Thailand Open | 1R | A | 3R | A | | 2R | NH | A | W | SF | W | F | W ('23, '25) | |
| Thailand Open | 1R | A | 3R | A | | 2R | NH | A | W | SF | W | F | W ('23, '25) | |
| Malaysia Masters | A | | | | | | NH | w/d | 2R | w/d | A | | 2R ('23) | |
| Singapore Open | A | | | | | NH | | A | SF | A | W | 2R | W ('25) | |
| Indonesia Open | A | | | | | NH | 1R | 1R | w/d | SF | SF | 1R | SF ('24, '25) | |
| Macau Open | A | | | | QF | NH | | | | A | | | QF ('19) | |
| U.S. Open | A | | | | | NH | | | F | A | | | F ('23) | |
| Canada Open | A | | | | | NH | | A | 1R | A | | | 1R ('23) | |
| Japan Open | A | | | | | NH | | 2R | QF | w/d | 1R | QF | QF ('23, '26) | |
| China Open | A | | | | | NH | | | w/d | SF | QF | 1R | SF ('24) | |
| Chinese Taipei Open | A | | | | 1R | NH | | A | | | | | 1R ('19) | |
| Korea Masters | A | | | | 2R | NH | | A | | W | A | | W ('24) | |
| China Masters | A | | | | | NH | | | 2R | QF | QF | QF | QF ('24, '25, '26) | |
| Vietnam Open | A | 2R | 1R | A | 2R | NH | | A | | | | | 2R ('16, '19) | |
| Arctic Open | N/A | | | | | NH | | | 1R | SF | F | QF | F ('25) | |
| Denmark Open | A | | | | | | 1R | 1R | 1R | 1R | QF | 1R | QF ('25) | |
| French Open | A | | | | | NH | 1R | QF | QF | F | SF | 1R | F ('24) | |
| Hylo Open | A | | | | | | QF | QF | A | | | | QF ('21, '22) | |
| Korea Open | A | | | | 1R | NH | | QF | A | | | | QF ('22) | |
| Japan Masters | N/A | | | | | | | | w/d | 2R | w/d | SF | SF ('26) | |
| Hong Kong Open | A | | | | | NH | | | w/d | A | w/d | F | F ('26) | |
| Syed Modi International | A | | | | QF | NH | | A | | | | | QF ('18) | |
| Superseries / Tour Finals | DNQ | | | | | | F | DNQ | RR | RR | SF | | F ('21) | |
| Spain Masters | N/A | | | A | | F | A | NH | A | | NH | | F ('20) | |
| Year-end ranking | 639 | 421 | 219 | 124 | 40 | 29 | 20 | 10 | 7 | 5 | 2 | | 1 | |
| Tournament | 2015 | 2016 | 2017 | 2018 | 2019 | 2020 | 2021 | 2022 | 2023 | 2024 | 2025 | 2026 | Best | Ref |

== Record against selected opponents ==
Record against year-end Finals finalists, World Championships semi-finalists, and Olympic quarter-finalists. Accurate as of 4 September 2026.

| Player | Matches | Won | Lost | Diff. |
|---|---|---|---|---|
| (China) Lin Dan | 2 | 0 | 2 | –2 |
| (China) Shi Yuqi | 11 | 4 | 7 | –3 |
| (China) Zhao Junpeng | 2 | 2 | 0 | +2 |
| (Chinese Taipei) Chou Tien-chen | 8 | 3 | 5 | –2 |
| (Denmark) Anders Antonsen | 13 | 4 | 9 | –5 |
| (Denmark) Viktor Axelsen | 9 | 1 | 8 | –7 |
| (Denmark) Hans-Kristian Vittinghus | 1 | 1 | 0 | +1 |
| (France) Alex Lanier | 6 | 3 | 3 | 0 |
| (France) Christo Popov | 8 | 4 | 4 | 0 |
| (India) B. Sai Praneeth | 1 | 1 | 0 | +1 |
| (India) Srikanth Kidambi | 5 | 4 | 1 | +3 |
| (India) Parupalli Kashyap | 2 | 2 | 0 | +2 |
| (India) Prannoy H. S. | 3 | 3 | 0 | +3 |

| Player | Matches | Won | Lost | Diff. |
|---|---|---|---|---|
| (India) Lakshya Sen | 13 | 8 | 5 | +3 |
| (Indonesia) Anthony Sinisuka Ginting | 8 | 5 | 3 | +2 |
| (Indonesia) Sony Dwi Kuncoro | 2 | 1 | 1 | 0 |
| (Indonesia) Tommy Sugiarto | 1 | 1 | 0 | +1 |
| (Japan) Kento Momota | 3 | 1 | 2 | –1 |
| (Japan) Kodai Naraoka | 16 | 10 | 6 | +4 |
| (Malaysia) Lee Zii Jia | 9 | 5 | 4 | +1 |
| (Singapore) Loh Kean Yew | 10 | 8 | 2 | +6 |
| (South Korea) Heo Kwang-hee | 2 | 1 | 1 | 0 |
| (Thailand) Kantaphon Wangcharoen | 4 | 2 | 2 | 0 |
| (Vietnam) Nguyễn Tiến Minh | 1 | 0 | 1 | –1 |

== Royal decoration ==
- 2021 – Commander (Third Class) of The Most Admirable Order of the Direkgunabhorn.
