= Ikhsan Rumbay =

Indonesian badminton player (born 2000)

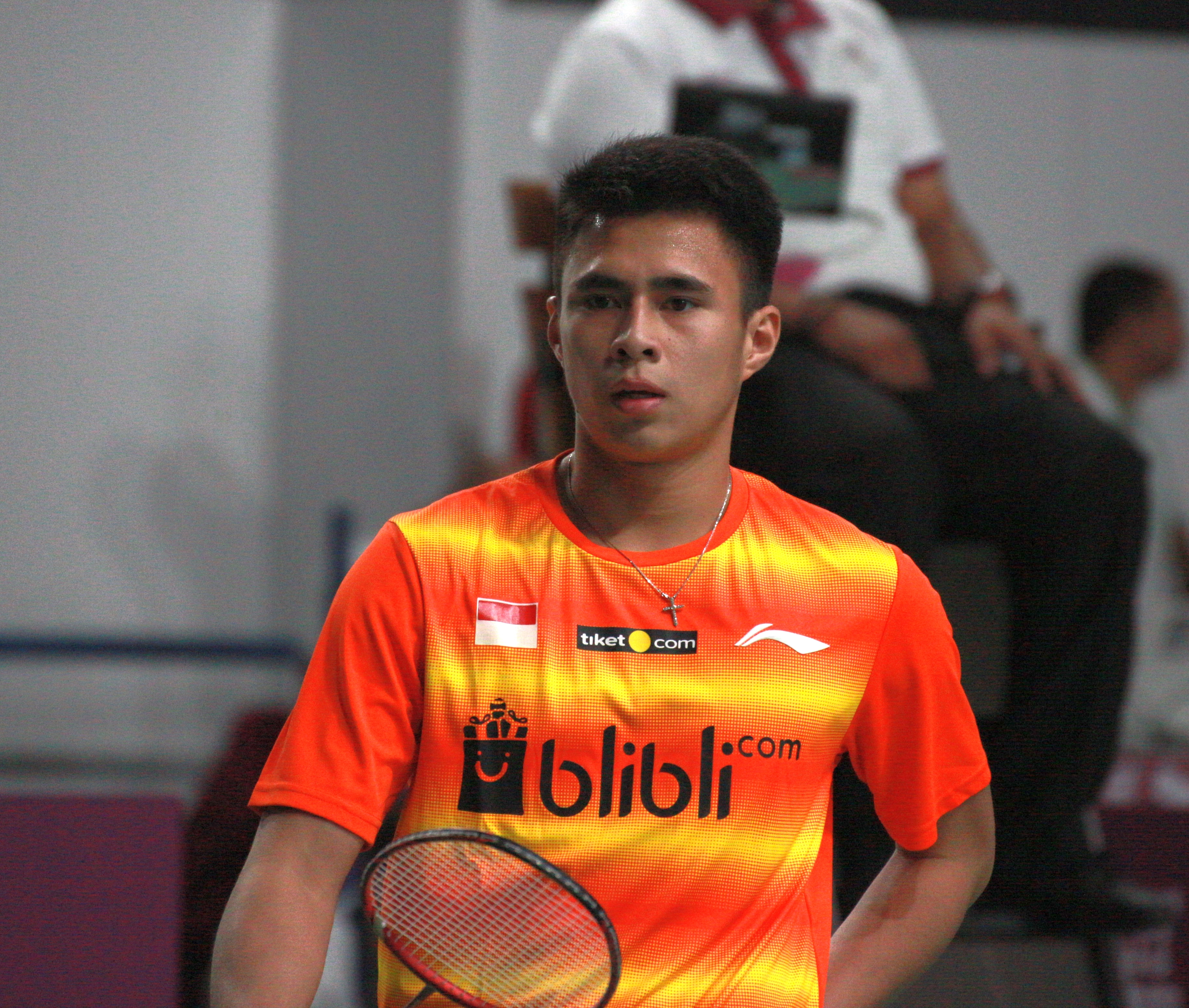

Personal information
- Born: Ikhsan Leonardo Imanuel Rumbay; 15 January 2000 (age 26) Tomohon, North Sulawesi, Indonesia
- Height: 1.74 m (5 ft 9 in)
- Weight: 66 kg (146 lb)

Sport
- Country: Indonesia
- Sport: Badminton
- Handedness: Right
- Coached by: Luluk Hadiyanto; Harry Hartono; Irwansyah

Men's singles
- Highest ranking: 63 (29 November 2022)
- BWF profile
Medal record
Men's badminton
Representing Indonesia
Asia Team Championships
Silver medal – second place	2022 Selangor	Men's team
World Junior Championships
Bronze medal – third place	2018 Markham	Mixed team
Asian Junior Championships
Silver medal – second place	2017 Jakarta	Mixed team
Bronze medal – third place	2018 Jakarta	Boys' singles
Bronze medal – third place	2018 Jakarta	Mixed team

Ikhsan Leonardo Imanuel Rumbay (born 15 January 2000) is an Indonesian badminton player, who also plays for the PB Djarum club in national events. He also attended Special Sports School Ragunan.

== Career ==
Rumbay started his senior tournament at the 32nd Brazil International. He played from the qualification round and made it to quarter final where he lost to Jason Ho-shue 15–21 18–21. A week later, he played at the III Peru International Series where he became runner-up to Luis Ramón Garrido. In December 2017, he clinched the boys' singles title at the Junior National Championships in Pangkal Pinang, after beating Gatjra Piliang Fiqihilahi Cupu in straight games. Rumbay was part of the national junior team that won the bronze medals at the 2018 Asian Junior Championships in the team and singles event.

Rumbay competed at the 2018 Summer Youth Olympics in Buenos Aires, Argentina representing his country, but lost to Lakshya Sen of India in the quarter-final. He participated at the World Junior Championships in Markham, Canada, and helped the team win the bronze medal.

=== 2023 ===
In January, Rumbay competed at the home tournament, Indonesia Masters, but had to lose in the first qualifying round from Indian player B. Sai Praneeth.

In September, Rumbay competed at the Indonesia Masters Super 100 I but lost at the third round from Chinese Taipei player Wang Po-wei in rubber games.

== Achievements ==
=== Asian Junior Championships ===
Boys' singles
Year	Venue	Opponent	Score	Result	Ref.
2018	Jaya Raya Sports Hall Training Center; Jakarta, Indonesia	(India) Lakshya Sen	7–21, 14–21	Bronze	

=== BWF International Challenge/Series (5 titles, 3 runners-up) ===
Men's singles
Year	Tournament	Opponent	Score	Result	Ref.
2017	Peru International	(Mexico) Luis Ramón Garrido	18–21, 14–21	(silver) Runner-up	
2018	Turkey International	(Turkey) Emre Lale	21–9, 21–14	(gold) Winner	
2019	Indonesia International	(Indonesia) Sony Dwi Kuncoro	21–13, 21–15	(gold) Winner	
2021	Bahrain International	(Singapore) Jason Teh	21–18, 21–15	(gold) Winner	
2022	Indonesia International	(Indonesia) Iqbal Diaz Syahputra	22–20, 21–15	(gold) Winner	
2023	Malaysia International	(Indonesia) Krishna Adi Nugraha	21–14, 21–18	(gold) Winner	
2024	Thailand International	(Thailand) Panitchaphon Teeraratsakul	19–21, 12–21	(silver) Runner-up	
2024 (I)	Indonesia International	(Indonesia) Yohanes Saut Marcellyno	15–21, 7–21	(silver) Runner-up	

BWF International Challenge tournament
BWF International Series tournament
BWF Future Series tournament

=== BWF Junior International (3 titles, 2 runners-up) ===
Boys' singles
Year	Tournament	Opponent	Score	Result
2017	Jaya Raya Junior International	(Thailand) Kunlavut Vitidsarn	17–21, 7–21	(silver) Runner-up
2017	Malaysia Junior International	(Indonesia) Handoko Yusuf Wijayanto	18–21, 21–18, 21–14	(gold) Winner
2018	Jaya Raya Junior International	(Thailand) Kunlavut Vitidsarn	14–21, 9–21	(silver) Runner-up
2018	India Junior International	(Indonesia) Christian Adinata	21–14, 21–13	(gold) Winner
2018	Malaysia Junior International	(Indonesia) Muhammad Aldo Apriyandi	21–14, 21–10	(gold) Winner

BWF Junior International Grand Prix tournament
BWF Junior International Challenge tournament
BWF Junior International Series tournament
BWF Junior Future Series tournament

== Performance timeline ==
Key

W	Won	F	Finalist	SF	Semi-finalist
QF	Quarter-finalist	#R	Rounds 4, 3, 2, 1	RR	Round-robin stage
Q#	Qualification round	A	Absent	w/d	Withdrew
G	Gold	S	Silver	B	Bronze
NH	Not held	N/A	Not applicable	DNQ	Did not qualify

=== National team ===
- Junior level

Team events	2017	2018
Asian Junior Championships	S	B
World Junior Championships	5th	B

- Senior level

Team events	2022
Asia Team Championships	S

=== Individual competitions ===
- Junior level

Event	2017	2018
Asian Junior Championships	QF	B
World Junior Championships	3R	4R
Youth Olympic Games	NH	QF

- Senior level

Tournament	BWF World Tour							Best	Ref
Tournament	2018	2019	2020	2021	2022	2023	2024	Best	Ref
Indonesia Masters	A	Q2	A			Q1	A	Q2 ('19)	
Orléans Masters	A		NH	A	2R	A		2R ('22)	
Ruichang China Masters	A	1R	NH			w/d	1R	1R ('19, '24)	
Australian Open	A		NH		QF	A		QF ('22)	
Kaohsiung Masters	NH					A	2R	2R ('24)	
Indonesia Masters Super 100	QF	QF	NH		2R	3R	QF	QF ('18, '19, '24 I)	
Indonesia Masters Super 100	QF	QF	NH		2R	2R	w/d	QF ('18, '19, '24 I)	
Taipei Open	A	Q2	NH		1R	A		1R ('22)	
Vietnam Open	A	2R	NH		A			2R ('19)	
Malaysia Super 100	NA					A	3R	3R ('24)	
Hyderabad Open	3R	3R	NH					3R ('18, '19)	
Year-end ranking	154	93	92	84	81	139	98	63	
