= 2019 Badminton Asia Junior Championships =

Tournament details
- Dates: 20–28 July 2019
- Edition: 22
- Level: International
- Venue: Suzhou Olympic Sports Centre
- Location: Suzhou, China

The 2019 Badminton Asia Junior Championships was the 22nd edition of the Asia continental junior championships to crown the best U-19 badminton players across Asia. This tournament was held in Suzhou, China from 20 to 28 July 2019.

== Tournament ==
The 2019 Badminton Asia Junior Championships was organized by Chinese Badminton Association, with sanction from the Badminton Asia. This tournament consists of team and individual events. There were 14 teams competing in the mixed team event, which had been held from 20 to 23 July, while the individual events will be held from 24 to 28 July.

=== Venue ===
This international tournament was held at Suzhou Olympic Sports Centre in Suzhou, China.

== Medal summary ==
=== Medalists ===
Event	Gold	Silver	Bronze
Teams	Thailand; Thanawin Madee; Ratchapol Makkasasithorn; Neuaduang Mangkornloi; Setthanan Piyawatcharavijit; Tanadon Punpanich; Sirawit Sothon; Apichasit Teerawiwat; Kunlavut Vitidsarn; Benyapa Aimsaard; Phittayaporn Chaiwan; Yanisa Cheuncharoen; Peeraya Khantaruangsakul; Sasikarn Piyawatcharavijit; Pornnicha Suwatnodom; Pitchayanin Ungka	Indonesia; Christian Adinata; Syabda Perkasa Belawa; Leo Rolly Carnando; Daniel Marthin; Dwiki Rafian Restu; Bobby Setiabudi; Andre Timotius Tololiu; Bernadus Bagas Kusuma Wardana; Dinda Dwi Cahyaning; Indah Cahya Sari Jamil; Febriana Dwipuji Kusuma; Nita Violina Marwah; Amalia Cahaya Pratiwi; Putri Syaikah; Putri Kusuma Wardani; Stephanie Widjaja	China; Dai Enyi; Di Zijian; Feng Yanzhe; Jiang Zhenbang; Li Yunze; Liu Liang; Ren Chengming; Wang Chang; Dai Wang; Han Qianxi; Li Yijing; Lin Fangling; Luo Xumin; Zhang Chi; Zhou Meng; Zhou Xinru
Teams	Thailand; Thanawin Madee; Ratchapol Makkasasithorn; Neuaduang Mangkornloi; Setthanan Piyawatcharavijit; Tanadon Punpanich; Sirawit Sothon; Apichasit Teerawiwat; Kunlavut Vitidsarn; Benyapa Aimsaard; Phittayaporn Chaiwan; Yanisa Cheuncharoen; Peeraya Khantaruangsakul; Sasikarn Piyawatcharavijit; Pornnicha Suwatnodom; Pitchayanin Ungka	Indonesia; Christian Adinata; Syabda Perkasa Belawa; Leo Rolly Carnando; Daniel Marthin; Dwiki Rafian Restu; Bobby Setiabudi; Andre Timotius Tololiu; Bernadus Bagas Kusuma Wardana; Dinda Dwi Cahyaning; Indah Cahya Sari Jamil; Febriana Dwipuji Kusuma; Nita Violina Marwah; Amalia Cahaya Pratiwi; Putri Syaikah; Putri Kusuma Wardani; Stephanie Widjaja	South Korea; Jin Yong; Ki Dong-ju; Kim Joon-young; Lee Hak-joo; Lee Min-seo; Noh Min-woo; Park Hyeon-seung; Park Sang-yong; Choi Hye-jin; Chung Da-jeong; Ji Young-bin; Kim A-young; Kim Ga-lam; Kim So-jung; Lee Eun-ji; Lee So-yul
Boys' singles	(Thailand) Kunlavut Vitidsarn	(China) Liu Liang	(China) Li Yunze
Boys' singles	(Thailand) Kunlavut Vitidsarn	(China) Liu Liang	(Chinese Taipei) Su Li-yang
Girls' singles	(China) Zhou Meng	(China) Han Qianxi	(China) Tan Ning
Girls' singles	(China) Zhou Meng	(China) Han Qianxi	(Thailand) Benyapa Aimsaard
Boys' doubles	(Indonesia) Leo Rolly Carnando (Indonesia) Daniel Marthin	(China) Di Zijian (China) Wang Chang	(Singapore) Howin Wong (Singapore) Aaron Yong
Boys' doubles	(Indonesia) Leo Rolly Carnando (Indonesia) Daniel Marthin	(China) Di Zijian (China) Wang Chang	(China) Dai Enyi (China) Feng Yanzhe
Girls' doubles	(China) Li Yijing (China) Luo Xumin	(China) Chen Yingxue (China) Zhang Chi	(China) Lin Fangling (China) Zhou Xinru
Girls' doubles	(China) Li Yijing (China) Luo Xumin	(China) Chen Yingxue (China) Zhang Chi	(China) Guo Lizhi (China) Keng Shuliang
Mixed doubles	(Indonesia) Leo Rolly Carnando (Indonesia) Indah Cahya Sari Jamil	(China) Feng Yanzhe (China) Lin Fangling	(China) Jiang Zhenbang (China) Li Yijing
Mixed doubles	(Indonesia) Leo Rolly Carnando (Indonesia) Indah Cahya Sari Jamil	(China) Feng Yanzhe (China) Lin Fangling	(China) Chen Xujun (China) Zhang Chi

=== Medal table ===
* Host nation (China)

Rank	Nation	Gold	Silver	Bronze	Total
1	China (CHN)*	2	5	8	15
2	Indonesia (INA)	2	1	0	3
3	Thailand (THA)	2	0	1	3
4	Chinese Taipei (TPE)	0	0	1	1
4	Singapore (SGP)	0	0	1	1
4	South Korea (KOR)	0	0	1	1
Totals (6 entries)		6	6	12	24

== Team event ==
=== Seeds ===
Seeds for team events were announced on 2 July.

1. Indonesia (final)
2. China (semi-finals)
3. Thailand (champion)
4. South Korea (semi-finals)
5. India (quarter-finals)
6. Japan (quarter-finals)
7. Chinese Taipei (group stage)
8. Singapore (quarter-finals)

=== Group stage ===
==== Group A ====
Pos	Team	Pld	W	L	MF	MA	MD	GF	GA	GD	PF	PA	PD	Pts	Qualification	Indonesia	Japan	Malaysia
1	Indonesia	2	2	0	9	1	+8	19	4	+15	461	338	+123	2	Advance to knockout stage	—	4–1	5–0
2	Japan	2	1	1	4	6	−2	10	14	−4	427	449	−22	1	Advance to knockout stage		—	3–2
3	Malaysia	2	0	2	2	8	−6	6	17	−11	350	451	−101	0				—

Source: TS

==== Group B ====
Pos	Team	Pld	W	L	MF	MA	MD	GF	GA	GD	PF	PA	PD	Pts	Qualification	Thailand	Hong Kong	Chinese Taipei for Olympic games	Sri Lanka
1	Thailand	3	3	0	14	1	+13	29	7	+22	734	503	+231	3	Advance to knockout stage	—	5–0	4–1	5–0
2	Hong Kong	3	2	1	8	7	+1	19	16	+3	625	595	+30	2	Advance to knockout stage		—	3–2	5–0
3	Chinese Taipei	3	1	2	7	8	−1	19	18	+1	678	643	+35	1				—	4–1
4	Sri Lanka	3	0	3	1	14	−13	3	29	−26	368	664	−296	0					—

Source: TS

==== Group C ====
Pos	Team	Pld	W	L	MF	MA	MD	GF	GA	GD	PF	PA	PD	Pts	Qualification	South Korea	India	Macau	Mongolia
1	South Korea	3	3	0	14	1	+13	29	4	+25	681	314	+367	3	Advance to knockout stage	—	4–1	5–0	5–0
2	India	3	2	1	11	4	+7	24	9	+15	625	419	+206	2	Advance to knockout stage		—	5–0	5–0
3	Macau	3	1	2	4	11	−7	9	22	−13	410	543	−133	1				—	4–1
4	Mongolia	3	0	3	1	14	−13	2	29	−27	201	641	−440	0					—

Source: TS

==== Group D ====
Pos	Team	Pld	W	L	MF	MA	MD	GF	GA	GD	PF	PA	PD	Pts	Qualification	People's Republic of China	Singapore	Nepal
1	China	2	2	0	10	0	+10	20	0	+20	420	149	+271	2	Advance to knockout stage	—	5–0	5–0
2	Singapore	2	1	1	5	5	0	10	10	0	313	310	+3	1	Advance to knockout stage		—	5–0
3	Nepal	2	0	2	0	10	−10	0	20	−20	146	420	−274	0				—

Source: TS

=== Knockout stage ===
Quarter-finals
22 July
Indonesia	3
India	0
22 July
South Korea	3
Singapore	0
22 July
Japan	2
Thailand	3
22 July
Hong Kong	0
China	3

Semi-finals
22 July
Indonesia	3
South Korea	1
22 July
Thailand	3
China	1

Final
23 July
Indonesia	2
Thailand	3
