= 2019 BWF World Junior Championships =

2019 badminton world junior championships

Tournament details
- Dates: 30 September – 13 October 2019
- Edition: 21st
- Level: International
- Venue: Kazan Gymnastics Center
- Location: Kazan, Tatarstan, Russia

The 2019 BWF World Junior Championships was the twenty-first edition of the BWF World Junior Championships. It was held in Kazan, Russia at the Kazan Gymnastics Center from 30 September to 13 October 2019.

== Host city selection ==
The original winner of the bid was Prague, Czech Republic, which was awarded the event in November 2017 during Badminton World Federation meeting at Jamaica, with Tipsport Arena as the proposed venue. Prague later withdrew and the Badminton World Federation later re-awarded the event to Kazan in November 2018 during the announcement of 18 major badminton event hosts from 2019 to 2025.

== Medalists ==
Event	Gold	Silver	Bronze
Teams	Indonesia; Christian Adinata; M. Lucky Andres Apriyanda; Syabda Perkasa Belawa; Leo Rolly Carnando; Daniel Marthin; Dwiki Rafian Restu; Bobby Setiabudi; Metya Inayah Cindiani; Indah Cahya Sari Jamil; Febriana Dwipuji Kusuma; Nita Violina Marwah; Amalia Cahaya Pratiwi; Helena Ayu Puspitasari; Putri Syaikah; Putri Kusuma Wardani; Stephanie Widjaja	China; Chen Xujun; Dai Enyi; Di Zijian; Dong Tianyao; Feng Yanzhe; Jiang Zhenbang; Li Yunze; Liu Liang; Ren Chengming; Wang Chang; Chen Yingxue; Dai Wang; Han Qianxi; Li Yijing; Lin Fangling; Luo Xumin; Tan Ning; Zhang Chi; Zhou Meng; Zhou Xinru	Thailand; Thanawin Madee; Ratchapol Makkasasithorn; Setthanan Piyawatcharavijit; Tanadon Punpanich; Sirawit Sothon; Varot Uraiwong; Kunlavut Vitidsarn; Benyapa Aimsaard; Phittayaporn Chaiwan; Pornpicha Choeikeewong; Yanisa Chuencharoen; Pichamon Phatcharaphisutsin; Atitaya Povanon; Pornnicha Suwatnodom; Pitchayanin Ungka
Teams	Indonesia; Christian Adinata; M. Lucky Andres Apriyanda; Syabda Perkasa Belawa; Leo Rolly Carnando; Daniel Marthin; Dwiki Rafian Restu; Bobby Setiabudi; Metya Inayah Cindiani; Indah Cahya Sari Jamil; Febriana Dwipuji Kusuma; Nita Violina Marwah; Amalia Cahaya Pratiwi; Helena Ayu Puspitasari; Putri Syaikah; Putri Kusuma Wardani; Stephanie Widjaja	China; Chen Xujun; Dai Enyi; Di Zijian; Dong Tianyao; Feng Yanzhe; Jiang Zhenbang; Li Yunze; Liu Liang; Ren Chengming; Wang Chang; Chen Yingxue; Dai Wang; Han Qianxi; Li Yijing; Lin Fangling; Luo Xumin; Tan Ning; Zhang Chi; Zhou Meng; Zhou Xinru	Japan; Yoshifumi Fujisawa; Shotaro Inamitsu; Takuma Kawamoto; Tsubasa Kawamura; Kakeru Kumagai; Hiroki Nishi; Takumi Shibata; Riki Takei; Riko Gunji; Rui Hirokami; Akari Kurihara; Atsumi Miyazaki; Kaho Osawa; Mizuki Otake; Hinata Suzuki; Chihiro Uchiyama
Boys' singles	(Thailand) Kunlavut Vitidsarn	(France) Christo Popov	(Indonesia) Yonathan Ramlie
Boys' singles	(Thailand) Kunlavut Vitidsarn	(France) Christo Popov	(China) Li Yunze
Girls' singles	(Japan) Riko Gunji	(China) Zhou Meng	(Thailand) Phittayaporn Chaiwan
Girls' singles	(Japan) Riko Gunji	(China) Zhou Meng	(China) Dai Wang
Boys' doubles	(Indonesia) Leo Rolly Carnando (Indonesia) Daniel Marthin	(China) Di Zijian (China) Wang Chang	(Japan) Takuma Kawamoto (Japan) Tsubasa Kawamura
Boys' doubles	(Indonesia) Leo Rolly Carnando (Indonesia) Daniel Marthin	(China) Di Zijian (China) Wang Chang	(China) Dai Enyi (China) Feng Yanzhe
Girls' doubles	(China) Lin Fangling (China) Zhou Xinru	(Indonesia) Febriana Dwipuji Kusuma (Indonesia) Amalia Cahaya Pratiwi	(Japan) Kaho Osawa (Japan) Hinata Suzuki
Girls' doubles	(China) Lin Fangling (China) Zhou Xinru	(Indonesia) Febriana Dwipuji Kusuma (Indonesia) Amalia Cahaya Pratiwi	(China) Li Yijing (China) Luo Xumin
Mixed doubles	(China) Feng Yanzhe (China) Lin Fangling	(Indonesia) Leo Rolly Carnando (Indonesia) Indah Cahya Sari Jamil	(China) Jiang Zhenbang (China) Li Yijing
Mixed doubles	(China) Feng Yanzhe (China) Lin Fangling	(Indonesia) Leo Rolly Carnando (Indonesia) Indah Cahya Sari Jamil	(Thailand) Ratchapol Makkasasithorn (Thailand) Benyapa Aimsaard

== Medal table ==
Rank	Nation	Gold	Silver	Bronze	Total
1	China (CHN)	2	3	5	10
2	Indonesia (INA)	2	2	1	5
3	Japan (JPN)	1	0	3	4
3	Thailand (THA)	1	0	3	4
5	France (FRA)	0	1	0	1
Totals (5 entries)		6	6	12	24
