= Magnus Johannesen =

Danish badminton player (born 2002)

Personal information
- Born: Magnus Johannesen; 2 February 2002 (age 24) Brønderslev, Denmark
- Years active: 2016
- Height: 1.78 m (5 ft 10 in)

Sport
- Country: Denmark
- Sport: Badminton
- Handedness: Left

Men's singles
- Highest ranking: 31 (18 July 2023)
- Current ranking: 58 (3 November 2026)
- BWF profile
Medal record
Men's badminton
Representing Denmark
Thomas Cup
Bronze medal – third place	2026 Horsens	Men's team
European Men's Team Championships
Gold medal – first place	2024 Łódź	Men's team
Silver medal – second place	2026 Istanbul	Men's team

Magnus Johannesen (born 2 February 2002) is a Danish badminton player.

== Personal life ==
Johannesen started to train badminton at the age of six in the Brønderslev club. He is a left-handed like his idol, Lin Dan. Johannesen grew up in a badminton family. His mother Trine Johannesen (née Sørensen) is a Danish former badminton player, while his aunt Mette van Dalm is a bronze medalist in the 1999 World Championships.

== Achievements ==
=== BWF World Tour (2 runners-up) ===
The BWF World Tour, which was announced on 19 March 2017 and implemented in 2018, is a series of elite badminton tournaments sanctioned by the Badminton World Federation (BWF). The BWF World Tour is divided into levels of World Tour Finals, Super 1000, Super 750, Super 500, Super 300, and the BWF Tour Super 100.

Men's singles
Year	Tournament	Level	Opponent	Score	Result	Ref.
2023	Orléans Masters	Super 300	(India) Priyanshu Rajawat	15–21, 21–19, 16–21	(silver) Runner-up	
2025	Hylo Open	Super 500	(Indonesia) Jonatan Christie	14–21, 14–21	(silver) Runner-up	

=== BWF International Challenge/Series (3 titles, 4 runners-up) ===
Men's singles
Year	Tournament	Opponent	Score	Result
2019	Latvia International	(Netherlands) Aram Mahmoud	9–21, 19–21	(silver) Runner-up
2022	Dutch International	(Indonesia) Firman Abdul Kholik	21–19, 21–9	(gold) Winner
2022	Luxembourg Open	(Denmark) Mads Christophersen	21–14, 15–21, 13–21	(silver) Runner-up
2022	Austrian International	(Malaysia) Yeoh Seng Zoe	14–21, 15–21	(silver) Runner-up
2022	Italian International	(Indonesia) Christian Adinata	16–21, 15–21	(silver) Runner-up
2022	Irish Open	(Chinese Taipei) Lin Chun-yi	21–14, 21–17	(gold) Winner
2025	Austrian Open	(England) Harry Huang	21–17, 21–14	(gold) Winner

BWF International Challenge tournament
BWF International Series tournament
BWF Future Series tournament
