= 2023 French Open (badminton) =

Tournament in Cesson-Sévigné, France

Tournament details
- Dates: 24 – 29 October
- Edition: 91st
- Level: Super 750
- Total prize money: US$850,000
- Venue: Glaz Arena
- Location: Cesson-Sévigné, France

Champions
- Men's singles: (Indonesia) Jonatan Christie
- Women's singles: (China) Chen Yufei
- Men's doubles: (Denmark) Kim Astrup (Denmark) Anders Skaarup Rasmussen
- Women's doubles: (China) Liu Shengshu (China) Tan Ning
- Mixed doubles: (China) Jiang Zhenbang (China) Wei Yaxin

The 2023 French Open (officially known as the Yonex Internationaux de France de Badminton 2023 for sponsorship reasons) was a badminton tournament which took place at the Glaz Arena in Cesson-Sévigné, France, from 24 to 29 October 2023 and had a total prize of US$850,000.

== Tournament ==
The 2023 French Open was the twenty-seventh tournament according to the 2023 BWF World Tour. It was a part of the French Open, which had been held since 1908. This tournament was organized by French Badminton Federation with sanction from the BWF.

=== Venue ===
This tournament was held at the Glaz Arena in Cesson-Sévigné, France.

=== Point distribution ===
Below is the point distribution table for each phase of the tournament based on the BWF points system for the BWF World Tour Super 750 event.

Winner	Runner-up	3/4	5/8	9/16	17/32
11,000	9,350	7,700	6,050	4,320	2,660

=== Prize money ===
The total prize money for this tournament was US$750,000. Distribution of prize money was in accordance with BWF regulations.

Event	Winner	Finals	Semi-finals	Quarter-finals	Last 16	Last 32
Singles	$59,500	$28,900	$11,900	$4,675	$2,550	$850
Doubles	$62,900	$29,750	$11,900	$5,312.5	$2,762.5	$850

== Men's singles ==
=== Seeds ===
1. (Denmark) Viktor Axelsen (First round)
2. (Indonesia) Anthony Sinisuka Ginting (Quarter-finals)
3. (Japan) Kodai Naraoka (Quarter-finals)
4. (Thailand) Kunlavut Vitidsarn (Quarter-finals)
5. (Indonesia) Jonatan Christie (Champion)
6. (China) Shi Yuqi (Quarter-finals)
7. (India) Prannoy H. S. (Withdrew)
8. (China) Li Shifeng (Final)

=== Finals ===
Semi-finals
(Singapore) Loh Kean Yew	18	13
5	(Indonesia) Jonatan Christie	21	21
(Malaysia) Ng Tze Yong	17	12
8	(China) Li Shifeng	21	21

Final
5	(Indonesia) Jonatan Christie	16	21	21
8	(China) Li Shifeng	21	15	14

=== Top half ===
==== Section 1 ====
First round
1	(Denmark) V Axelsen	17	0^{r}
(Hong Kong) Ng K L	21	0
(France) C Popov	11	18
(Singapore) Loh K Y	21	21
6	(China) Shi YQ	21	21
PFR	(Republic of Ireland) N Nguyen	12	8
PFR	(Belgium) J Carraggi	17	21	16
(Denmark) A Antonsen	21	18	21

Second round
(Hong Kong) Ng K L	8	21
(Singapore) Loh K Y	21	23
6	(China) Shi YQ	21	21
(Denmark) A Antonsen	13	13

Quarter-finals
(Singapore) Loh K Y	21	21
6	(China) Shi YQ	17	19

==== Section 2 ====
First round
3	(Japan) K Naraoka	21	21
PFR	(Thailand) K Wangcharoen	11	12
(China) Lu GZ	18	19
(Hong Kong) Lee C Y	21	21
5	(Indonesia) J Christie	21	21
(Japan) K Nishimoto	11	19
(Chinese Taipei) Lin C-y	18	21	21
PFR	(China) Lei LX	21	15	11

Second round
3	(Japan) K Naraoka	21	21
(Hong Kong) Lee C Y	17	19
5	(Indonesia) J Christie	21	7	21
(Chinese Taipei) Lin C-y	14	21	11

Quarter-finals
3	(Japan) K Naraoka	8	23
5	(Indonesia) J Christie	21	25

=== Bottom half ===
==== Section 3 ====
First round
PFR	(Netherlands) M Caljouw	9	9
(Malaysia) Ng T Y	21	21
(India) L Sen	15	18
PFR	(France) A Merklé	21	21
(Japan) K Watanabe	21	19	23
(Chinese Taipei) Chou T-c	13	21	25
(Israel) M Zilberman	11	2^{r}
4	(Thailand) K Vitidsarn	21	8

Second round
(Malaysia) Ng T Y	21	21
PFR	(France) A Merklé	19	8
(Chinese Taipei) Chou T-c	8	19
4	(Thailand) K Vitidsarn	21	21

Quarter-finals
(Malaysia) Ng T Y	w	/	o
4	(Thailand) K Vitidsarn

==== Section 4 ====
First round
(Malaysia) Lee Z J	21	21
(China) Weng HY	15	11
(China) Zhao JP	15	15
8	(China) Li SF	21	21
(France) T J Popov	21	21
(India) S Kidambi	17	15
(Denmark) M Johannesen	14	21	8
2	(Indonesia) A S Ginting	21	16	21

Second round
(Malaysia) Lee Z J	21	11	12
8	(China) Li SF	17	21	21
(France) T J Popov	21	17	19
2	(Indonesia) A S Ginting	11	21	21

Quarter-finals
8	(China) Li SF	21	21
2	(Indonesia) A S Ginting	15	13

== Women's singles ==
=== Seeds ===
1. (South Korea) An Se-young (Withdrew)
2. (Japan) Akane Yamaguchi (Withdrew)
3. (China) Chen Yufei (Champion)
4. (Chinese Taipei) Tai Tzu-ying (Final)
5. (China) He Bingjiao (Semi-finals)
6. (Spain) Carolina Marín (Quarter-finals)
7. (Indonesia) Gregoria Mariska Tunjung (First round)
8. (China) Han Yue (Quarter-finals)

=== Finals ===
Semi-finals
5	(China) He Bingjiao	20	21	9
3	(China) Chen Yufei	22	19	21
4	(Chinese Taipei) Tai Tzu-ying	20	21	22
(Japan) Aya Ohori	22	10	20

Final
3	(China) Chen Yufei	21	22
4	(Chinese Taipei) Tai Tzu-ying	17	20

=== Top half ===
==== Section 1 ====
First round
PFR	(Spain) C Azurmendi	17	10
(Scotland) K Gilmour	21	21
(Denmark) L Christophersen	8	10
(Thailand) P Chochuwong	21	21
5	(China) He BJ	21	23
(Denmark) L Kjærsfeldt	18	21
(Malaysia) Goh J W	13	20
(China) Zhang YM	21	22

Second round
(Scotland) K Gilmour	14	13
(Thailand) P Chochuwong	21	21
5	(China) He BJ	21	17	21
(China) Zhang YM	15	21	10

Quarter-finals
(Thailand) P Chochuwong	22	16
5	(China) He BJ	24	21

==== Section 2 ====
First round
3	(China) Chen YF	21	21
(Vietnam) Nguyễn T L	19	5
(China) Wang ZY	21	21
(Japan) S Kawakami	11	14
8	(China) Han Y	21	21
(Singapore) Yeo J M	16	16
(Japan) N Nidaira	9	13
(South Korea) Kim G-e	21	21

Second round
3	(China) Chen YF	21	21
(China) Wang ZY	18	19
8	(China) Han Y	21	21
(South Korea) Kim G-e	12	13

Quarter-finals
3	(China) Chen YF	18	21	21
8	(China) Han Y	21	17	7

=== Bottom half ===
==== Section 3 ====
First round
(Denmark) M Blichfeldt	21	13	16
(Thailand) S Katethong	18	21	21
(India) P. V. Sindhu	12	21	21
7	(Indonesia) G M Tunjung	21	18	15
(Chinese Taipei) Pai Y-p	21	21
(Japan) N Okuhara	14	12
(Germany) Y Li	12	11
4	(Chinese Taipei) Tai T-y	21	21

Second round
(Thailand) S Katethong	18	1
(India) P. V. Sindhu	21	1^{r}
(Chinese Taipei) Pai Y-p	17	21
4	(Chinese Taipei) Tai T-y	21	23

Quarter-finals
(Thailand) S Katethong	16	21	17
4	(Chinese Taipei) Tai T-y	21	10	21

==== Section 4 ====
First round
(Indonesia) P K Wardani	21	12
PFR	(Belgium) L Tan	15	6^{r}
(China) Gao FJ	7	13
6	(Spain) C Marín	21	21
(Thailand) B Ongbamrungphan	21	18	21
(Chinese Taipei) Hsu W-c	13	21	19
(Japan) A Ohori	21	21
PFR	(United States) L Lam	17	13

Second round
(Indonesia) P K Wardani	16	18
6	(Spain) C Marin	21	21
(Thailand) B Ongbamrungphan	10	12
(Japan) A Ohori	21	21

Quarter-finals
6	(Spain) C Marin	18	18
(Japan) A Ohori	21	21

== Men's doubles ==
=== Seeds ===
1. (Indonesia) Fajar Alfian / Muhammad Rian Ardianto (Quarter-finals)
2. (China) Liang Weikeng / Wang Chang (Second round)
3. (India) Satwiksairaj Rankireddy / Chirag Shetty (Second round)
4. (South Korea) Kang Min-hyuk / Seo Seung-jae (Quarter-finals)
5. (Malaysia) Aaron Chia / Soh Wooi Yik (Withdrew)
6. (Japan) Takuro Hoki / Yugo Kobayashi (Second round)
7. (Denmark) Kim Astrup / Anders Skaarup Rasmussen (Champions)
8. (China) Liu Yuchen / Ou Xuanyi (Semi-finals)

=== Finals ===
Semi-finals
7	(Denmark) Kim Astrup (Denmark) Anders Skaarup Rasmussen	21	21
8	(China) Liu Yuchen (China) Ou Xuanyi	17	19
(China) He Jiting (China) Ren Xiangyu	16	21	20
(Indonesia) Muhammad Shohibul Fikri (Indonesia) Bagas Maulana	21	19	22

Final
7	(Denmark) Kim Astrup (Denmark) Anders Skaarup Rasmussen	21	10	21
(Indonesia) Muhammad Shohibul Fikri (Indonesia) Bagas Maulana	14	21	18

=== Top half ===
==== Section 1 ====
First round
1	(Indonesia) F Alfian (Indonesia) M R Ardianto	21	21
(Scotland) A Dunn (Scotland) A Hall	13	16
(Scotland) C Grimley (Scotland) M Grimley	20	21	16
PFR	(Denmark) D Lundgaard (Denmark) M Vestergaard	22	13	21
7	(Denmark) K Astrup (Denmark) A S Rasmussen	21	21
(Japan) A Koga (Japan) T Saito	16	14
(China) Tan Q (China) Zhou HD	15	16
(Thailand) S Jomkoh (Thailand) K Kedren	21	21

Second round
1	(Indonesia) F Alfian (Indonesia) M R Ardianto	21	21
PFR	(Denmark) D Lundgaard (Denmark) M Vestergaard	12	12
7	(Denmark) K Astrup (Denmark) A S Rasmussen	22	21	21
(Thailand) S Jomkoh (Thailand) K Kedren	24	18	19

Quarter-finals
1	(Indonesia) F Alfian (Indonesia) M R Ardianto	18	15
7	(Denmark) K Astrup (Denmark) A S Rasmussen	21	21

==== Section 2 ====
First round
3	(India) S Rankireddy (India) C Shetty	21	21
(France) L Corvée (France) R Labar	13	13
(Indonesia) M Ahsan (Indonesia) H Setiawan	21	21
(Chinese Taipei) Lu C-y (Chinese Taipei) Yang P-ha	17	16
8	(China) Liu YC (China) Ou XY	21	21
(Germany) M Lamsfuß (Germany) M Seidel	16	7
(South Korea) Jin Y (South Korea) Na S-s	22	21
(Malaysia) Ong Y S (Malaysia) Teo E Y	20	19

Second round
3	(India) S Rankireddy (India) C Shetty	23	21	19
(Indonesia) M Ahsan (Indonesia) H Setiawan	25	19	21
8	(China) Liu YC (China) Ou XY	21	21	21
(South Korea) Jin Y (South Korea) Na S-s	23	12	16

Quarter-finals
(Indonesia) M Ahsan (Indonesia) H Setiawan	12	16
8	(China) Liu YC (China) Ou XY	21	21

=== Bottom half ===
==== Section 3 ====
First round
(Chinese Taipei) Lee J-h (Chinese Taipei) Yang P-hs	14	14
(China) He JT (China) Ren XY	21	21
(Indonesia) L R Carnando (Indonesia) D Marthin	w	/	o
5	(Malaysia) A Chia (Malaysia) Soh W Y
(China) Chen BY (China) Liu Y	13	14
(England) B Lane (England) S Vendy	21	21
(France) C Popov (France) T J Popov	15	16
4	(South Korea) Kang M-h (South Korea) Seo S-j	21	21

Second round
(China) He JT (China) Ren XY	21	21
(Indonesia) L R Carnando (Indonesia) D Marthin	14	8
(England) B Lane (England) S Vendy	21	18	10
4	(South Korea) Kang M-h (South Korea) Seo S-j	19	21	21

Quarter-finals
(China) He JT (China) Ren XY	16	21	21
4	(South Korea) Kang M-h (South Korea) Seo S-j	21	7	19

==== Section 4 ====
First round
(Indonesia) M S Fikri (Indonesia) B Maulana	16	21	21
(Japan) K Matsui (Japan) Y Takeuchi	21	11	10
(Chinese Taipei) Lee Y (Chinese Taipei) Wang C-l	17	21	18
6	(Japan) T Hoki (Japan) Y Kobayashi	21	17	21
(Malaysia) Man W C (Malaysia) Tee K W	21	18	15
(Denmark) R Kjær (Denmark) F Søgaard	18	21	21
(Indonesia) P Kusumawardana (Indonesia) Y Rambitan	15	21
2	(China) Liang WK (China) Wang C	21	23

Second round
(Indonesia) M S Fikri (Indonesia) B Maulana	21	23
6	(Japan) T Hoki (Japan) Y Kobayashi	14	21
(Denmark) R Kjær (Denmark) F Søgaard	21	21
2	(China) Liang WK (China) Wang C	14	18

Quarter-finals
(Indonesia) M S Fikri (Indonesia) B Maulana	21	21
(Denmark) R Kjær (Denmark) F Søgaard	11	17

== Women's doubles ==
=== Seeds ===
1. (China) Chen Qingchen / Jia Yifan (Second round)
2. (South Korea) Baek Ha-na / Lee So-hee (Withdrew)
3. (South Korea) Kim So-yeong / Kong Hee-yong (Withdrew)
4. (Japan) Yuki Fukushima / Sayaka Hirota (Quarter-finals)
5. (Japan) Nami Matsuyama / Chiharu Shida (Quarter-finals)
6. (China) Zhang Shuxian / Zheng Yu (First round)
7. (Indonesia) Apriyani Rahayu / Siti Fadia Silva Ramadhanti (Semi-finals)
8. (Japan) Mayu Matsumoto / Wakana Nagahara (Semi-finals)

=== Finals ===
Semi-finals
(China) Liu Shengshu (China) Tan Ning	21	17	21
7	(Indonesia) Apriyani Rahayu (Indonesia) Siti Fadia Silva Ramadhanti	15	21	14
8	(Japan) Mayu Matsumoto (Japan) Wakana Nagahara	20	21	22
(Thailand) Jongkolphan Kititharakul (Thailand) Rawinda Prajongjai	22	13	24

Final
(China) Liu Shengshu (China) Tan Ning	26	21
(Thailand) Jongkolphan Kititharakul (Thailand) Rawinda Prajongjai	24	19

=== Top half ===
==== Section 1 ====
First round
1	(China) Chen QC (China) Jia YF	21	21
PFR	(Latvia) A Kupca (Latvia) J Romanova	11	12
(China) Liu SS (China) Tan N	21	21
(Denmark) M Fruergaard (Denmark) S Thygesen	12	17
5	(Japan) N Matsuyama (Japan) C Shida	21	21
(Thailand) B Aimsaard (Thailand) N Aimsaard	15	15
(India) R Panda (India) S Panda	6	16
(China) Li YJ (China) Luo XM	21	21

Second round
1	(China) Chen QC (China) Jia YF	11	21	14
(China) Liu SS (China) Tan N	21	9	21
5	(Japan) N Matsuyama (Japan) C Shida	21	21
(China) Li YJ (China) Luo XM	8	8

Quarter-finals
(China) Liu SS (China) Tan N	9	21	21
5	(Japan) N Matsuyama (Japan) C Shida	21	16	19

==== Section 2 ====
First round
4	(Japan) Y Fukushima (Japan) S Hirota	21	21
(Hong Kong) Yeung N T (Hong Kong) Yeung P L	13	15
(Japan) R Miyaura (Japan) A Sakuramoto	21	14	21
(Netherlands) D Jille (Netherlands) C Seinen	12	21	15
7	(Indonesia) A Rahayu (Indonesia) S F S Ramadhanti	21	21
(Indonesia) F D Kusuma (Indonesia) A C Pratiwi	16	18
(Malaysia) V Hoo (Malaysia) Lim C S	21	21
(Malaysia) A Cheong (Malaysia) Teoh M X	19	19

Second round
4	(Japan) Y Fukushima (Japan) S Hirota	w	/	o
(Japan) R Miyaura (Japan) A Sakuramoto
7	(Indonesia) A Rahayu (Indonesia) S F S Ramadhanti	21	21
(Malaysia) V Hoo (Malaysia) Lim C S	8	18

Quarter-finals
4	(Japan) Y Fukushima (Japan) S Hirota	16	19
7	(Indonesia) A Rahayu (Indonesia) S F S Ramadhanti	21	21

=== Bottom half ===
==== Section 3 ====
First round
(Japan) R Hirokami (Japan) Y Kato	21	17	21
(United States) F Corbett (United States) A Lee	10	21	17
(Germany) L Efler (Germany) I Lohau	14	13
8	(Japan) M Matsumoto (Japan) W Nagahara	21	21
(Scotland) J MacPherson (Scotland) C Torrance	18	14
(South Korea) Lee Y-l (South Korea) Shin S-c	21	21
(France) M Lambert (France) A Tran	21	21
PFR	(Estonia) K-K Marran (Estonia) H Rüütel	9	8

Second round
(Japan) R Hirokami (Japan) Y Kato	16	20
8	(Japan) M Matsumoto (Japan) W Nagahara	21	22
(South Korea) Lee Y-l (South Korea) Shin S-c	21	21	13
(France) M Lambert (France) A Tran	23	14	21

Quarter-finals
8	(Japan) M Matsumoto (Japan) W Nagahara	21	21
(France) M Lambert (France) A Tran	15	18

==== Section 4 ====
First round
(Chinese Taipei) Lee C-h (Chinese Taipei) Teng C-h	24	17
(Japan) R Iwanaga (Japan) K Nakanishi	26	21
(Thailand) J Kititharakul (Thailand) R Prajongjai	22	21
6	(China) Zhang SX (China) Zheng Y	20	15
(United States) P L Cao Hok (United States) L Lam	w	/	o
(Malaysia) P Tan (Malaysia) Thinaah M
(South Korea) Jeong N-e (South Korea) Kim H-j	w	/	o
2	(South Korea) Baek H-n (South Korea) Lee S-h

Second round
(Japan) R Iwanaga (Japan) K Nakanishi	11	9
(Thailand) J Kititharakul (Thailand) R Prajongjai	21	21
(United States) P L Cao Hok (United States) L Lam	9	8
(South Korea) Jeong N-e (South Korea) Kim H-j	21	21

Quarter-finals
(Thailand) J Kititharakul (Thailand) R Prajongjai	21	21
(South Korea) Jeong N-e (South Korea) Kim H-j	16	19

== Mixed doubles ==
=== Seeds ===
1. (China) Zheng Siwei / Huang Yaqiong (Quarter-finals)
2. (Japan) Yuta Watanabe / Arisa Higashino (Semi-finals)
3. (China) Feng Yanzhe / Huang Dongping (First round)
4. (South Korea) Seo Seung-jae / Chae Yoo-jung (First round)
5. (Thailand) Dechapol Puavaranukroh / Sapsiree Taerattanachai (Second round)
6. (South Korea) Kim Won-ho / Jeong Na-eun (Semi-finals)
7. (France) Thom Gicquel / Delphine Delrue (First round)
8. (China) Jiang Zhenbang / Wei Yaxin (Champions)

=== Finals ===
Semi-finals
6	(South Korea) Kim Won-ho (South Korea) Jeong Na-eun	17	8
8	(China) Jiang Zhenbang (China) Wei Yaxin	21	21
(Hong Kong) Tang Chun Man (Hong Kong) Tse Ying Suet	21	21
2	(Japan) Yuta Watanabe (Japan) Arisa Higashino	19	18

Final
8	(China) Jiang Zhenbang (China) Wei Yaxin	21	15	21
(Hong Kong) Tang Chun Man (Hong Kong) Tse Ying Suet	17	21	12

=== Top half ===
==== Section 1 ====
First round
1	(China) Zheng SW (China) Huang YQ	21	21
(England) M Ellis (England) L Smith	12	11
(England) G Mairs (England) J Mairs	18	18
(Japan) Y Kaneko (Japan) M Matsutomo	21	21
6	(South Korea) Kim W-h (South Korea) Jeong N-e	21	21
(China) Cheng X (China) Chen FH	14	18
(Germany) M Lamsfuß (Germany) I Lohau	17	17
(Japan) K Yamashita (Japan) N Shinoya	21	21

Second round
1	(China) Zheng SW (China) Huang YQ	21	21
(Japan) Y Kaneko (Japan) M Matsutomo	19	18
6	(South Korea) Kim W-h (South Korea) Jeong N-e	21	21
(Japan) K Yamashita (Japan) N Shinoya	17	15

Quarter-finals
1	(China) Zheng SW (China) Huang YQ	21	21
6	(South Korea) Kim W-h (South Korea) Jeong N-e	23	23

==== Section 2 ====
First round
4	(South Korea) Seo S-j (South Korea) Chae Y-j	21	19	11
(Denmark) M Thyrri (Denmark) A Magelund	19	21	21
(Malaysia) Tan K M (Malaysia) Lai P J	21	21	17
(Indonesia) R N Kusharjanto (Indonesia) L A Kusumawati	18	23	21
8	(China) Jiang ZB (China) Wei YX	21	21
(Japan) H Midorikawa (Japan) N Saito	16	10
(Indonesia) P Jordan (Indonesia) M D Oktavianti	21	21
(Thailand) S Jomkoh (Thailand) S Paewsampran	17	17

Second round
(Denmark) M Thyrri (Denmark) A Magelund	21	8	18
(Indonesia) R N Kusharjanto (Indonesia) L A Kusumawati	16	21	21
8	(China) Jiang ZB (China) Wei YX	23	21
(Indonesia) P Jordan (Indonesia) M D Oktavianti	21	18

Quarter-finals
(Indonesia) R N Kusharjanto (Indonesia) L A Kusumawati	22	10
8	(China) Jiang ZB (China) Wei YX	24	21

=== Bottom half ===
==== Section 3 ====
First round
PFR	(Denmark) M Vestergaard (Denmark) C Busch	12	15
(Malaysia) Chen T J (Malaysia) Toh E W	21	21
(Hong Kong) Lee C H (Hong Kong) Ng T Y	21	19	21
7	(France) T Gicquel (France) D Delrue	19	21	9
(Malaysia) Goh S H (Malaysia) S J Lai	21	21
(Chinese Taipei) Yang P-hs (Chinese Taipei) Hu L-f	9	8
(Hong Kong) Tang C M (Hong Kong) Tse Y S	21	21
3	(China) Feng YZ (China) Huang DP	19	19

Second round
(Malaysia) Chen T J (Malaysia) Toh E W	19	15
(Hong Kong) Lee C H (Hong Kong) Ng T Y	21	21
(Malaysia) Goh S H (Malaysia) S J Lai	20	21	13
(Hong Kong) Tang C M (Hong Kong) Tse Y S	22	19	21

Quarter-finals
(Hong Kong) Lee C H (Hong Kong) Ng T Y	16	11
(Hong Kong) Tang C M (Hong Kong) Tse Y S	21	21

==== Section 4 ====
First round
(Scotland) A Hall (Scotland) J MacPherson	11	0^{r}
(Singapore) T Hee (Singapore) J Tan	21	0
(Indonesia) R Rivaldy (Indonesia) P H Mentari	14	15
5	(Thailand) D Puavaranukroh (Thailand) S Taerattanachai	21	21
(Netherlands) R Tabeling (Netherlands) S Piek	18	21	14
(Indonesia) D Ferdinansyah (Indonesia) G E Widjaja	21	13	21
(Chinese Taipei) Ye H-w (Chinese Taipei) Lee C-h	18	16
2	(Japan) Y Watanabe (Japan) A Higashino	21	21

Second round
(Singapore) T Hee (Singapore) J Tan	21	15
5	(Thailand) D Puavaranukroh (Thailand) S Taerattanachai	18	11^{r}
(Indonesia) D Ferdinansyah (Indonesia) G E Widjaja	18	20
2	(Japan) Y Watanabe (Japan) A Higashino	21	22

Quarter-finals
(Singapore) T Hee (Singapore) J Tan	22	17
2	(Japan) Y Watanabe (Japan) A Higashino	24	21

Preceded by 2023 Denmark Open; 2023 Abu Dhabi Masters	BWF World Tour; 2023 BWF season	Succeeded by 2023 Hylo Open; 2023 Malaysia Super 100
