= BWF World Ranking =

Badminton world ranking

The BWF World Ranking is the official ranking of the Badminton World Federation for badminton players who participate in tournaments sanctioned by Badminton World Federation. It is used to determine the qualification for the World Championships and Summer Olympic Games, as well as BWF World Tour tournaments. Seedings of draws at all BWF-sanctioned tournaments are conducted using the BWF World Ranking. Players under 19 years of age are eligible to rank in the BWF World Junior Ranking, which were introduced in January 2011. The following lists are the rankings:

== Overview ==
The ranking points are awarded based on the level and progress of the tournament from each player/pair. Ranking points calculated are based on the tournaments each players/pairs participate in from the last 52 weeks. If a player or pair has participated in ten or fewer World Ranking tournaments, then the ranking is worked out by adding together the points won at tournaments in the last 52 weeks. If a player or pair has participated in 11 or more World Ranking tournaments, only the 10 highest points scored in the tournaments during the 52-week period count towards their ranking. The highest possible ranking points are 124,000 as of 2022 but will soon increase to 125,000 in 2023 with 4 Super 1000 Tournaments. Though the highest points ever achieved are 123,905 by the korean men’s double pair of Kim Won-ho and Seo Seung-jae on 14 April 2026.

== Points system ==
Points system used are as follows:

=== After 23 April 2024 ===
Since 2024 (Week 17), BWF has used a new system for counting points:

Tournament	Winner	Runner-up	3/4	5/8	9/16	17/32	33/64	65/128	129/256
Grade 1 – BWF tournaments
World Championships	14,500	12,500	10,500	8,200	6,000	3,700	1,450	750	300
Olympic Games^{1}	14,500	12,500	^{1}10,500	8,200	6,000	3,700	1,450	750	300
Grade 2 – BWF World Tour
Level 1 (Finals)^{2}	14,000	12,000	10,000	7,800	5,700	3,500	1,400	720	280
Level 2 (If minimum $500,000 additional prize money) (Super 1000)	13,500	11,500	9,500	7,400	5,400	3,300	1,350	670	270
Level 2 (If between $250,000 - $499,999 additional prize money) (Super 1000)	12,700	10,800	9,000	7,000	5,100	3,150	1,270	630	250
Level 2 (Super 1000)	12,000	10,200	8,400	6,600	4,800	3,000	1,200	600	240
Level 3 (Super 750)	11,000	9,350	7,700	6,050	4,320	2,660	1,060	520	210
Level 4 (Super 500)	9,200	7,800	6,420	5,040	3,600	2,220	880	430	170
Level 5 (Super 300)	7,000	5,950	4,900	3,850	2,750	1,670	660	320	130
Level 6 (Super 100)	5,500	4,680	3,850	3,030	2,110	1,290	510	240	100
Grade 3 – BWF Continental Circuit
International Challenge	4,000	3,400	2,800	2,200	1,520	920	360	170	70
International Series	2,500	2,130	1,750	1,370	920	550	210	100	40
Future Series	1,700	1,420	1,170	920	600	350	130	60	20

^1 – At the Olympic Games 3rd place will receive 11,500 points. Fourth place will receive 10,500 points.
^2 – Starting 2024, at the World Tour Finals' group stage 3rd place will receive 8,900 points. Fourth place will receive 7,800 points.

=== 2018–16 April 2024 system ===
Since 2018, BWF has started a new system for counting points:

(For implementation in tournaments up to and including week 16 2024)

Tournament	Winner	Runner-up	3/4	5/8	9/16	17/32	33/64	65/128	129/256
Grade 1 – BWF tournaments
World Championships	13,000	11,000	9,200	7,200	5,200	3,200	1,300	650	260
Olympic Games^{1}	13,000	11,000	^{1}9,200	7,200	5,200	3,200	1,300	650	260
Grade 2 – BWF World Tour
Level 1 (Finals)^{2}	12,000	10,200	8,400	6,600	4,800	3,000	1,200	600	240
Level 2 (Super 1000)	12,000	10,200	8,400	6,600	4,800	3,000	1,200	600	240
Level 3 (Super 750)	11,000	9,350	7,700	6,050	4,320	2,660	1,060	520	210
Level 4 (Super 500)	9,200	7,800	6,420	5,040	3,600	2,220	880	430	170
Level 5 (Super 300)	7,000	5,950	4,900	3,850	2,750	1,670	660	320	130
Level 6 (Super 100)	5,500	4,680	3,850	3,030	2,110	1,290	510	240	100
Grade 3 – BWF Continental Circuit
International Challenge	4,000	3,400	2,800	2,200	1,520	920	360	170	70
International Series	2,500	2,130	1,750	1,370	920	550	210	100	40
Future Series	1,700	1,420	1,170	920	600	350	130	60	20

^1 – At the Olympic Games 3rd place will receive 10,100 points. Fourth place will receive 9,200 points.
^2 – From 2022, at the World Tour Finals' group stage 3rd place will receive 7,500 points. Fourth place will receive 6,600 points.

=== 2007–2017 system ===
Tournament	Winner	Runner-up	3/4	5/8	9/16	17/32	33/64	65/128	129/256	257/512	513/1024
BWF tournaments (World Championships and Olympic Games)^{1}	12,000	10,200	8,400	6,600	4,800	3,000	1,200	600	240	120	60
Super Series Masters Finals; Super Series Premier	11,000	9,350	7,700	6,050	4,320	2,660	1,060	520			
Super Series	9,200	7,800	6,420	5,040	3,600	2,220	880	430	170	80	40
Grand Prix Gold	7,000	5,950	4,900	3,850	2,750	1,670	660	320	130	60	30
Grand Prix	5,500	4,680	3,850	3,030	2,110	1,290	510	240	100	45	30
International Challenge	4,000	3,400	2,800	2,200	1,520	920	360	170	70	30	20
International Series	2,500	2,130	1,750	1,370	920	550	210	100	40	20	10
Future Series	1,700	1,420	1,170	920	600	350	130	60	20	10	5

^1 – At the Olympic Games, third place receives 9,200 points while fourth place receives 8,400 points.

=== 30 January, 2003 – 31 December, 2006 system ===
The points in the new system are multiplied by 10 from the previous one:

Level	Winner	Runner-up	3/4	5/8	9/16	17/32	33/64	65/128	129/256	257/512	513/1024
World Championships, and Olympic Games
7*	6,000	5,100	4,200	3,300	2,400	1,500	600	300	120	60	30
World Grand Prix
6*	5,400	4,590	3,780	2,970	2,160	1,350	540	270	108	54	27
5*	4,800	4,080	3,360	2,640	1,920	1,200	480	240	96	48	24
4*	4,200	3,570	2,940	2,310	1,680	1,050	420	210	84	42	21
3*	3,600	3,060	2,520	1,980	1,440	900	360	180	72	36	18
2*	3,000	2,550	2,100	1,650	1,200	750	300	150	60	30	15
1*	2,400	2,040	1,680	1,320	960	600	240	120	48	24	12
International Circuit
A	1,800	1,530	1,260	990	720	450	180	90	36	18	9
B	1,200	1,020	840	660	480	300	120	60	24	12	6
C	600	510	420	330	240	150	60	30	12	6	3

=== April 1, 1995 – 29 January 2003 system ===
1. The points system chart:

Level	Winner	Runner-up	3/4	5/8	9/16	17/32	33/64	65/128	129/256	257/512	513/1024
World Championships, and Olympic Games
7*	600	510	420	330	240	150	60	30	12	6	3
World Grand Prix
6*	540	459	378	297	216	135	54	27	10.8	5.4	2.7
5*	480	408	336	264	192	120	48	24	9.6	4.8	2.4
4*	420	357	294	231	168	105	42	21	8.4	4.2	2.1
3*	360	306	252	198	144	90	36	18	7.2	3.6	1.8
2*	300	255	210	165	120	75	30	15	6	3	1.5
1*	240	204	168	132	96	60	24	12	4.8	2.4	1.2
International Circuit
A	180	153	126	99	72	45	18	9	3.6	1.8	0.9
B	120	102	84	66	48	30	12	6	2.4	1.2	0.6
C	60	51	42	33	24	15	6	3	1.2	0.6	0.3
D	40	34	28	22	16	10	4	2	0.8	0.4	0.2
E	20	17	14	11	8	5	2	1	0.4	0.2	0.1

2. World Badminton Grand Prix Finals are ranked as 6* event, the points system is as follows:

Discipline	Winner	Runner-up	3/4	2nd in Group	3rd in Group	4th in Group
Singles	540	459	378	297	256.5	216
Doubles	540	459	378	—N/a	337.5	297

== Player rankings ==
Players in their highest peak
- Italic indicates retired players

=== Men's singles ===
BWF World Rankings (Men's singles) as of 17 November 2026
#		Country	Players	Points	Highest peak	
#		Country	Players	Points	Rank	Date
1	Steady	France	Christo Popov	89,932	1	October 27, 2026
2	Steady	Thailand	Kunlavut Vitidsarn	89,465	1	June 3, 2025
3	Steady	Denmark	Anders Antonsen	85,525	2	September 27, 2022
4	Steady	Canada	Victor Lai	84,245	4	November 10, 2026
5	Steady	Chinese Taipei	Chou Tien-chen	82,230	2	August 6, 2019
6	Steady	France	Alex Lanier	81,565	4	October 27, 2026
7	Steady	China	Shi Yuqi	79,525	1	June 11, 2024
8	▲1	Indonesia	Jonatan Christie	78,631	1	August 25, 2026
9	▼1	Japan	Kodai Naraoka	75,590	2	December 12, 2023
10	Steady	Indonesia	Alwi Farhan	73,699	10	June 16, 2026
11	▲2	India	Lakshya Sen	68,503	6	November 8, 2022
12	▼1	Singapore	Loh Kean Yew	68,300	3	November 8, 2022
13	▼1	France	Toma Junior Popov	66,047	12	November 3, 2026
14	Steady	Chinese Taipei	Lin Chun-yi	64,924	8	March 10, 2026
15	Steady	Japan	Koki Watanabe	59,220	11	October 22, 2024
16	▲1	Japan	Yushi Tanaka	60,025	16	November 17, 2026
17	▲1	China	Li Shifeng	57,383	3	October 31, 2023
18	▼2	Thailand	Panitchaphon Teeraratsakul	57,295	16	August 25, 2026
19	Steady	Hong Kong	Lee Cheuk Yiu	54,143	13	January 23, 2024
20	Steady	Hong Kong	Jason Gunawan	55,560	20	November 10, 2026

=== Women's singles ===
BWF World Rankings (Women's singles) as of 17 November 2026
#		Country	Players	Points	Highest peak	
#		Country	Players	Points	Rank	Date
1	Steady	South Korea	An Se-young	122,287	1	August 1, 2023
2	Steady	Japan	Akane Yamaguchi	103,726	1	April 19, 2018
3	Steady	China	Wang Zhiyi	101,389	2	November 19, 2024
4	Steady	China	Chen Yufei	87,351	1	December 17, 2019
5	▲1	India	P. V. Sindhu	74,421	2	April 7, 2017
6	▼1	Thailand	Ratchanok Intanon	73,386	1	April 21, 2016
7	Steady	Japan	Tomoka Miyazaki	71,406	6	June 10, 2025
8	Steady	Thailand	Pornpawee Chochuwong	70,277	6	February 4, 2025
9	Steady	Indonesia	Putri Kusuma Wardani	69,903	6	December 23, 2025
10	Steady	Japan	Nozomi Okuhara	68,930	1	October 29, 2019
11	Steady	China	Han Yue	64,698	3	March 18, 2025
12	Steady	Denmark	Line Christophersen	57,940	12	October 13, 2026
13	Steady	South Korea	Kim Ga-eun	57,791	12	December 9, 2023
14	Steady	Japan	Hina Akechi	54,680	14	November 10, 2026
15	Steady	South Korea	Sim Yu-jin	54,544	11	September 3, 2019
16	Steady	Canada	Michelle Li	53,277	8	October 22, 2019
17	Steady	Chinese Taipei	Lin Hsiang-ti	53,009	16	June 2, 2026
18	Steady	Denmark	Line Højmark Kjærsfeldt	52,533	16	July 30, 2019
19	Steady	Japan	Riko Gunji	52,183	18	June 2, 2026
20	▲5	Denmark	Mia Blichfeldt	49,653	11	September 3, 2019

=== Men's doubles ===
BWF World Rankings (Men's doubles) as of 17 November 2026
#		Country	Players	Points	Highest peak (pair)		Highest peak (individual)		
#		Country	Players	Points	Rank	Date	Rank	Partner	Date
1	Steady	South Korea	Kim Won-ho	111,499	1	July 22, 2025	1	(South Korea) Seo Seung-jae	July 22, 2025
1	Steady	South Korea	Seo Seung-jae	111,499	1	July 22, 2025	1	(South Korea) Kim Won-ho	July 22, 2025
2	Steady	Indonesia	Fajar Alfian	95,153	2	June 2, 2026	1	(Indonesia) Muhammad Rian Ardianto	December 27, 2022
2	Steady	Indonesia	Muhammad Shohibul Fikri	95,153	2	June 2, 2026	2	(Indonesia) Fajar Alfian	June 2, 2026
3	Steady	China	Liang Weikeng	95,089	1	October 31, 2023	1	(China) Wang Chang	October 31, 2023
3	Steady	China	Wang Chang	95,089	1	October 31, 2023	1	(China) Liang Weikeng	October 31, 2023
4	Steady	Malaysia	Aaron Chia	87,504	2	January 24, 2023	2	(Malaysia) Soh Wooi Yik	January 24, 2023
4	Steady	Malaysia	Soh Wooi Yik	87,504	2	January 24, 2023	2	(Malaysia) Aaron Chia	January 24, 2023
5	Steady	Malaysia	Goh Sze Fei	80,547	1	May 27, 2025	1	(Malaysia) Nur Izzuddin	May 27, 2025
5	Steady	Malaysia	Nur Izzuddin	80,547	1	May 27, 2025	1	(Malaysia) Goh Sze Fei	May 27, 2025
6	Steady	India	Satwiksairaj Rankireddy	74,831	1	October 10, 2023	1	(India) Chirag Shetty	October 10, 2023
6	Steady	India	Chirag Shetty	74,831	1	October 10, 2023	1	(India) Satwiksairaj Rankireddy	October 10, 2023
7	Steady	Indonesia	Sabar Karyaman Gutama	68,746	7	March 18, 2025	7	(Indonesia) Muhammad Reza Pahlevi Isfahani	March 18, 2025
7	Steady	Indonesia	Muhammad Reza Pahlevi Isfahani	68,746	7	March 18, 2025	7	(Indonesia) Sabar Karyaman Gutama	March 18, 2025
8	Steady	England	Ben Lane	68,421	8	August 25, 2026	8	(England) Sean Vendy	August 25, 2026
8	Steady	England	Sean Vendy	68,421	8	August 25, 2026	8	(England) Ben Lane	August 25, 2026
9	Steady	Malaysia	Man Wei Chong	67,863	4	December 16, 2025	4	(Malaysia) Tee Kai Wun	December 16, 2025
9	Steady	Malaysia	Tee Kai Wun	67,863	4	December 16, 2025	4	(Malaysia) Man Wei Chong	December 16, 2025
10	Steady	Japan	Takuro Hoki	66,460	1	September 20, 2022	1	(Japan) Yugo Kobayashi	September 20, 2022
10	Steady	Japan	Yugo Kobayashi	66,460	1	September 20, 2022	1	(Japan) Takuro Hoki	September 20, 2022
11	Steady	South Korea	Kang Min-hyuk	63,153	9	October 20, 2026	2	(South Korea) Seo Seung-jae	February 20, 2024
11	Steady	South Korea	Ki Dong-ju	63,153	9	October 20, 2026	9	(South Korea) Kang Min-hyuk	October 20, 2026
12	▲2	Denmark	Daniel Lundgaard	63,075	12	September 29, 2026	12	(Denmark) Mads Vestergaard	September 29, 2026
12	▲2	Denmark	Mads Vestergaard	63,075	12	September 29, 2026	12	(Denmark) Daniel Lundgaard	September 29, 2026
13	▼1	China	Chen Boyang	62,715	7	December 16, 2025	7	(China) Liu Yi	December 16, 2025
13	▼1	China	Liu Yi	62,715	7	December 16, 2025	7	(China) Chen Boyang	December 16, 2025
14	▼1	Indonesia	Raymond Indra	62,086	10	June 9, 2026	10	(Indonesia) Nikolaus Joaquin	June 9, 2026
14	▼1	Indonesia	Nikolaus Joaquin	62,086	10	June 9, 2026	10	(Indonesia) Raymond Indra	June 9, 2026
15	Steady	Chinese Taipei	Lee Jhe-huei	54,506	7	January 21, 2025	7	(Chinese Taipei) Yang Po-hsuan	January 21, 2025
15	Steady	Chinese Taipei	Yang Po-hsuan	54,506	7	January 21, 2025	7	(Chinese Taipei) Lee Jhe-huei	January 21, 2025
16	Steady	Japan	Kakeru Kumagai	52,788	16	November 10, 2026	16	(Japan) Hiroki Nishi	November 6, 2026
16	Steady	Japan	Hiroki Nishi	52,788	16	November 10, 2026	16	(Japan) Kakeru Kumagai	November 6, 2026
17	▲1	China	Hu Keyuan	52,153	17	November 17, 2026	17	(China) Lin Xiangyi	November 17, 2026
17	▲1	China	Lin Xiangyi	52,153	17	November 17, 2026	17	(China) Hu Keyuan	November 17, 2026
18	▲1	Indonesia	Leo Rolly Carnando	51,790	9	May 23, 2023	9	(Indonesia) Daniel Marthin (Indonesia) Bagas Maulana	May 23, 2023; April 15, 2025
18	▲1	Indonesia	Daniel Marthin	51,790	9	May 23, 2023	9	(Indonesia) Leo Rolly Carnando	May 23, 2023; April 15, 2025
19	▲1	Denmark	Christian Faust Kjær	50,940	19	November 17, 2026	19	(Denmark) Rasmus Kjær	November 17, 2026
19	▲1	Denmark	Rasmus Kjær	50,940	19	November 17, 2026	19	(Denmark) Christian Faust Kjær	November 17, 2026
20	▼3	Chinese Taipei	Chiu Hsiang-chieh	50,355	11	February 10, 2026	11	(Chinese Taipei) Wang Chi-lin	February 10, 2026
20	▼3	Chinese Taipei	Wang Chi-lin	50,355	11	February 10, 2026	2	(Chinese Taipei) Lee Yang	September 27, 2022

=== Women's doubles ===
BWF World Rankings (Women's doubles) as of 17 November 2026
#		Country	Players	Points	Highest peak (pair)		Highest peak (individual)		
#		Country	Players	Points	Rank	Date	Rank	Partner	Date
1	Steady	China	Liu Shengshu	114,167	1	October 22, 2024	1	(China) Tan Ning	October 22, 2024
1	Steady	China	Tan Ning	114,167	1	October 22, 2024	1	(China) Liu Shengshu	October 22, 2024
2	Steady	South Korea	Baek Ha-na	100,434	1	October 29, 2024	1	(South Korea) Lee So-hee	October 29, 2024
2	Steady	South Korea	Lee So-hee	100,434	1	October 29, 2024	1	(South Korea) Baek Ha-na	October 29, 2024
3	Steady	Japan	Yuki Fukushima	95,906	2	July 28, 2026	1	(Japan) Sayaka Hirota	June 21, 2018
3	Steady	Japan	Mayu Matsumoto	95,906	2	July 28, 2026	1	(Japan) Wakana Nagahara	April 30, 2019
4	Steady	Malaysia	Pearly Tan	87,250	2	July 29, 2025	2	(Malaysia) Thinaah Muralitharan	July 29, 2025
4	Steady	Malaysia	Thinaah Muralitharan	87,250	2	July 29, 2025	2	(Malaysia) Pearly Tan	July 29, 2025
5	Steady	Japan	Rin Uesaka	74,414	4	March 11, 2025	4	(Japan) Kie Nakanishi	March 11, 2025
5	Steady	Japan	Kie Nakanishi	74,414	4	March 11, 2025	4	(Japan) Rin Iwanaga	March 11, 2025
6	▲1	Chinese Taipei	Hsu Yin-hui	67,324	6	October 20, 2026	6	(Chinese Taipei) Lin Jhih-yun	October 20, 2026
6	▲1	Chinese Taipei	Lin Jhih-yun	67,324	6	October 20, 2026	6	(Chinese Taipei) Hsu Yin-hui	October 20, 2026
7	▼1	Indonesia	Rachel Allessya Rose	66,056	6	October 27, 2026	6	(Indonesia) Febi Setianingrum	October 27, 2026
7	▼1	Indonesia	Febi Setianingrum	66,056	6	October 27, 2026	6	(Indonesia) Rachel Allessya Rose	October 27, 2026
8	Steady	Indonesia	Amallia Cahaya Pratiwi	62,563	8	November 3, 2026	8	(Indonesia) Febriana Dwipuji Kusuma	January 14, 2025
8	Steady	Indonesia	Siti Fadia Silva Ramadhanti	62,563	8	November 3, 2026	4	(Indonesia) Apriyani Rahayu	April 18, 2023
9	Steady	Bulgaria	Gabriela Stoeva	62,556	8	June 28, 2018	8	(Bulgaria) Stefani Stoeva	June 28, 2018
9	Steady	Bulgaria	Stefani Stoeva	62,556	8	June 28, 2018	8	(Bulgaria) Gabriela Stoeva	June 28, 2018
10	Steady	Indonesia	Febriana Dwipuji Kusuma	61,974	8	October 20, 2026	8	(Indonesia) Amallia Cahaya Pratiwi (Indonesia) Meilysa Trias Puspita Sari	January 14, 2025; October 20, 2026
10	Steady	Indonesia	Meilysa Trias Puspita Sari	61,974	8	October 20, 2026	8	(Indonesia) Febriana Dwipuji Kusuma	October 20, 2026
11	▲2	Japan	Sumire Nakade	60,570	11	October 27, 2026	11	(Japan) Miyu Takahashi	October 27, 2026
11	▲2	Japan	Miyu Takahashi	60,570	11	October 27, 2026	11	(Japan) Sumire Nakade	October 27, 2026
12	▼1	Chinese Taipei	Hsieh Pei-shan	59,515	8	March 10, 2026	8	(Chinese Taipei) Hung En-tzu	March 10, 2026
12	▼1	Chinese Taipei	Hung En-tzu	59,515	8	March 10, 2026	8	(Chinese Taipei) Hsieh Pei-shan	March 10, 2026
13	▼1	Japan	Rui Hirokami	57,960	11	June 30, 2026	11	(Japan) Sayaka Hobara	June 30, 2026
13	▼1	Japan	Sayaka Hobara	57,960	11	June 30, 2026	11	(Japan) Rui Hirokami	June 30, 2026
14	Steady	United States	Lauren Lam	57,539	14	November 10, 2026	14	(United States) Allison lee	November 10, 2026
14	Steady	United States	Allison Lee	57,539	14	November 10, 2026	15	(United States) Lauren Lam	November 3, 2026
15	▲1	Japan	Sayaka Hirota	56,120	14	October 27, 2026	1	(Japan) Yuki Fukushima	June 21, 2018
15	▲1	Japan	Ayako Sakuramoto	56,120	14	October 27, 2026	9	(Japan) Yukiko Takahata	February 5, 2019
16	▲1	China	Bao Lijing	55,940	16	October 27, 2026	16	(China) Cao Zihan	October 27, 2026
16	▲1	China	Cao Zihan	55,940	16	October 27, 2026	16	(China) Bao Lijing	October 27, 2026
17	▼2	Japan	Hinata Suzuki	55,387	13	October 27, 2026	13	(Japan) Nao Yamakita	October 27, 2026
17	▼2	Japan	Nao Yamakita	55,387	13	October 27, 2026	13	(Japan) Hinata Suzuki	October 27, 2026
18	Steady	Chinese Taipei	Hsu Ya-ching	53,849	13	March 10, 2026	13	(Chinese Taipei) Sung Yu-hsuan	March 10, 2026
18	Steady	Chinese Taipei	Sung Yu-hsuan	53,849	13	March 10, 2026	13	(Chinese Taipei) Hsu Ya-ching	March 10, 2026
19	▲1	India	Treesa Jolly	53,022	9	January 14, 2025	9	(India) Gayatri Gopichand	January 14, 2025
19	▲1	India	Gayatri Gopichand	53,022	9	January 14, 2025	9	(India) Treesa Jolly	January 14, 2025
20	▼1	Hong Kong	Yeung Nga Ting	52,794	12	August 27, 2024	12	(Hong Kong) Yeung Pui Lam	August 27, 2024
20	▼1	Hong Kong	Yeung Pui Lam	52,794	12	August 27, 2024	12	(Hong Kong) Yeung Nga Ting	August 27, 2024

=== Mixed doubles ===
BWF World Rankings (Mixed doubles) as of 10 November 2026
#		Country	Players	Points	Highest peak (pair)		Highest peak (individual)		
#		Country	Players	Points	Rank	Date	Rank	Partner	Date
1	Steady	China	Feng Yanzhe	109,950	1	November 26, 2024	1	(China) Huang Dongping	November 26, 2024
1	Steady	China	Huang Dongping	109,950	1	November 26, 2024	1	(China) Wang Yilyu (China) Feng Yanzhe	April 12, 2018; November 26, 2024
2	Steady	China	Jiang Zhenbang	93,600	1	March 18, 2025	1	(China) Wei Yaxin	March 18, 2025
2	Steady	China	Wei Yaxin	93,600	1	March 18, 2025	1	(China) Jiang Zhenbang	March 18, 2025
3	Steady	France	Thom Gicquel	89,250	3	October 27, 2026	3	(France) Delphine Delrue	October 27, 2026
3	Steady	France	Delphine Delrue	89,250	3	October 27, 2026	3	(France) Thom Gicquel	October 27, 2026
4	Steady	Denmark	Mathias Christiansen	84,470	2	September 8, 2026	2	(Denmark) Alexandra Bøje	September 8, 2026
4	Steady	Denmark	Alexandra Bøje	84,470	2	September 8, 2026	2	(Denmark) Mathias Christiansen	September 8, 2026
5	▲1	China	Guo Xinwa	79,670	5	March 18, 2025	5	(China) Chen Fanghui	March 18, 2025
5	▲1	China	Chen Fanghui	79,670	5	March 18, 2025	5	(China) Guo Xinwa	March 18, 2025
6	▼1	Thailand	Dechapol Puavaranukroh	76,690	2	August 25, 2025	1	(Thailand) Sapsiree Taerattanachai	December 7, 2021
6	▼1	Thailand	Sapsiree Taerattanachai	76,690	2	August 25, 2025	2	(Thailand) Dechapol Puavaranukroh	August 25, 2025
7	▲1	China	Cheng Xing	66,800	7	September 8, 2026	7	(China) Zhang Chi	September 8, 2026
7	▲1	China	Zhang Chi	66,800	7	September 8, 2026	7	(China) Cheng Xing	September 8, 2026
8	▼1	Chinese Taipei	Ye Hong-wei	66,630	7	October 6, 2026	7	(Chinese Taipei) Nicole Gonzales Chan	October 6, 2026
8	▼1	Chinese Taipei	Nicole Gonzales Chan	66,630	7	October 6, 2026	7	(Chinese Taipei) Ye Hong-wei	October 6, 2026
9	Steady	Indonesia	Amri Syahnawi	63,020	9	October 27, 2026	9	(Indonesia) Nita Violina Marwah	October 27, 2026
9	Steady	Indonesia	Nita Violina Marwah	63,020	9	October 27, 2026	9	(Indonesia) Amri Syahnawi	October 27, 2026
10	▲2	Japan	Yuta Watanabe	60,700	10	October 6, 2026	1	(Japan) Arisa Higashino	November 8, 2022
10	▲2	Japan	Maya Taguchi	60,700	10	October 6, 2026	10	(Japan) Yuta Watanabe	November 17, 2026
11	▼1	Chinese Taipei	Yang Po-hsuan	59,310	6	March 11, 2025	6	(Chinese Taipei) Hu Ling-fang	March 11, 2025
11	▼1	Chinese Taipei	Hu Ling-fang	59,310	6	March 11, 2025	6	(Chinese Taipei) Yang Po-hsuan	March 11, 2025
12	▼1	Malaysia	Goh Soon Huat	58,750	3	February 18, 2025	3	(Malaysia) Shevon Jemie Lai	February 18, 2025
12	▼1	Malaysia	Shevon Jemie Lai	58,750	3	February 18, 2025	3	(Malaysia) Goh Soon Huat	February 18, 2025
13	Steady	Japan	Akira Koga	58,410	13	October 27, 2026	13	(Japan) Natsu Saito	November 10, 2026
13	Steady	Japan	Natsu Saito	58,410	13	October 27, 2026	7	(Japan) Hiroki Midorikawa	October 21, 2025
14	Steady	Malaysia	Hoo Pang Ron	57,420	14	November 3, 2026	14	(Malaysia) Hoo Pang Ron	November 10, 2026
14	Steady	Malaysia	Lai Pei Jing	57,420	14	November 3, 2026	14	(Malaysia) Lai Pei Jing	November 10, 2026
15	Steady	Hong Kong	Tang Chun Man	55,070	2	June 28, 2018	2	(Hong Kong) Tse Ying Suet	June 28, 2018
15	Steady	Hong Kong	Tse Ying Suet	55,070	2	June 28, 2018	2	(Hong Kong) Tang Chun Man	June 28, 2018
16	▲2	China	Zhu Yijun	54,620	16	November 17, 2026	16	(China) Li Qian	November 17, 2026
16	▲2	China	Li Qian	54,620	16	November 17, 2026	16	(China) Zhu Yijun	November 17, 2026
17	▲6	China	Gao Jiaxuan	53,060	17	November 17, 2026	17	(China) Wu Mengying	November 17, 2026
17	▲6	China	Wu Mengying	53,060	17	November 17, 2026	17	(China) Gao Jiaxuan	November 17, 2026
18	▼1	Thailand	Pakkapon Teeraratsakul	52,880	14	June 8, 2026	14	(Thailand) Sapsiree Taerattanachai	June 8, 2026
18	▼1	Thailand	Sapsiree Taerattanachai	52,880	14	June 8, 2026	14	(Thailand) Pakkapon Teeraratsakul	June 8, 2026
19	Steady	Japan	Yuichi Shimogami	52,840	13	July 21, 2026	13	(Japan) Sayaka Hobara	July 21, 2026
19	Steady	Japan	Sayaka Hobara	52,840	13	July 21, 2026	13	(Japan) Yuichi Shimogami	July 21, 2026
20	▼4	United States	Presley Smith	51,480	14	October 27, 2026	14	(United States) Jennie Gai	October 27, 2026
20	▼4	United States	Jennie Gai	51,480	14	October 27, 2026	14	(United States) Presley Smith	October 27, 2026

== World team rankings ==
BWF World Team Rankings as of 6 October 2026
#	Country	Conf.	Men's singles	Women's singles	Men's doubles	Women's doubles	Mixed doubles	Sudirman Cup	Thomas Cup	Uber Cup	Points	Highest peak	
#	Country	Conf.	Men's singles	Women's singles	Men's doubles	Women's doubles	Mixed doubles	Sudirman Cup	Thomas Cup	Uber Cup	Points	Rank	Date
1	China	Asia	1,500	1,500	1,200	1,500	1,500	5,000	2,500	2,000	16,700	1	January 2011
2	South Korea	Asia	750	1,500	1,500	1,500	500	4,000	750	2,500	13,000	1	July 2017
3	Japan	Asia	1,200	1,500	1,200	1,500	1,000	3,000	1,000	1,500	11,900	1	October 2018
4	Indonesia	Asia	1,200	1,200	1,500	1,000	1,000	3,000	750	1,500	11,150	2	July 2025
5	Chinese Taipei	Asia	1,500	1,000	1,000	1,200	1,200	2,000	1,000	1,000	9,900	5	July 2018
6	Denmark	Europe	1,200	1,000	1,000	250	1,500	2,000	1,500	1,000	9,450	2	January 2012
7	India	Asia	1,000	1,200	1,200	1,000	1,000	1,500	1,500	750	9,150	5	July 2023
8	Malaysia	Asia	750	750	1,200	1,200	1,200	2,000	1,000	1,000	9,100	4	April 2025
9	Thailand	Asia	1,500	1,200	500	500	1,200	2,000	1,000	1,000	8,900	4	October 2013
10	France	Europe	1,500	500	500	500	1,200	1,500	2,000	568	8,268	10	July 2026
11	Canada	Pan America	1,200	1,000	500	500	250	1,500	750	750	6,450	11	July 2023
12	Hong Kong	Asia	1,000	500	250	1,000	1,200	1,500	388	388	6,025	9	July 2014
13	United States	Pan America	500	750	500	1,000	1,000	750	400	400	5,300	13	November 2026
14	England	Europe	500	250	1,200	250	500	1,350	750	288	5,088	10	July 2019
15	Germany	Europe	500	750	250	125	500	1,200	568	568	4,460	7	October 2011
16	Spain	Europe	250	500	250	500	500	1,135	568	675	4,378	14	April 2023
17	Singapore	Asia	1,000	750	500	125	125	775	388	388	4,050	9	October 2014
18	Australia	Oceania	250	250	125	250	250	1,350	675	675	3,825	16	October 2017
19	Turkey	Europe	100	750	125	500	250	575	438	750	3,488	17	January 2024
20	Bulgaria	Europe	100	750	50	1,000	125	575	38	750	3,388	15	October 2016

== Year-end number one players ==
Year	Men's Singles	Women's Singles	Men's Doubles	Women's Doubles	Mixed Doubles
2008	(Malaysia) Lee Chong Wei	(Hong Kong) Zhou Mi	(Indonesia) Markis Kido (Indonesia) Hendra Setiawan	(China) Du Jing (China) Yu Yang	(Indonesia) Nova Widianto (Indonesia) Liliyana Natsir
2009	(Malaysia) Lee Chong Wei	(China) Wang Yihan	(Malaysia) Koo Kien Keat (Malaysia) Tan Boon Heong	(China) Ma Jin (China) Wang Xiaoli	(South Korea) Lee Yong-dae (South Korea) Lee Hyo-jung
2010	(Malaysia) Lee Chong Wei	(China) Wang Xin	(Denmark) Mathias Boe (Denmark) Carsten Mogensen	(Chinese Taipei) Cheng Wen-hsing (Chinese Taipei) Chien Yu-chin	(Denmark) Thomas Laybourn (Denmark) Kamilla Rytter Juhl
2011	(Malaysia) Lee Chong Wei	(China) Wang Yihan	(China) Cai Yun (China) Fu Haifeng	(China) Wang Xiaoli (China) Yu Yang	(China) Zhang Nan (China) Zhao Yunlei
2012	(Malaysia) Lee Chong Wei	(China) Li Xuerui	(Denmark) Mathias Boe (Denmark) Carsten Mogensen	(China) Tian Qing (China) Zhao Yunlei	(China) Xu Chen (China) Ma Jin
2013	(Malaysia) Lee Chong Wei	(China) Li Xuerui	(Indonesia) Mohammad Ahsan (Indonesia) Hendra Setiawan	(China) Wang Xiaoli (China) Yu Yang	(China) Zhang Nan (China) Zhao Yunlei
2014	(China) Chen Long	(China) Li Xuerui	(South Korea) Lee Yong-dae (South Korea) Yoo Yeon-seong	(China) Tian Qing (China) Zhao Yunlei	(China) Zhang Nan (China) Zhao Yunlei
2015	(China) Chen Long	(Spain) Carolina Marín	(South Korea) Lee Yong-dae (South Korea) Yoo Yeon-seong	(China) Luo Ying (China) Luo Yu	(China) Zhang Nan (China) Zhao Yunlei
2016	(Malaysia) Lee Chong Wei	(Chinese Taipei) Tai Tzu-ying	(Malaysia) Goh V Shem (Malaysia) Tan Wee Kiong	(Japan) Misaki Matsutomo (Japan) Ayaka Takahashi	(China) Zheng Siwei (China) Chen Qingchen
2017	(Denmark) Viktor Axelsen	(Chinese Taipei) Tai Tzu-ying	(Indonesia) Marcus Fernaldi Gideon (Indonesia) Kevin Sanjaya Sukamuljo	(China) Chen Qingchen (China) Jia Yifan	(China) Zheng Siwei (China) Chen Qingchen
2018	(Japan) Kento Momota	(Chinese Taipei) Tai Tzu-ying	(Indonesia) Marcus Fernaldi Gideon (Indonesia) Kevin Sanjaya Sukamuljo	(Japan) Yuki Fukushima (Japan) Sayaka Hirota	(China) Zheng Siwei (China) Huang Yaqiong
2019	(Japan) Kento Momota	(China) Chen Yufei	(Indonesia) Marcus Fernaldi Gideon (Indonesia) Kevin Sanjaya Sukamuljo	(China) Chen Qingchen (China) Jia Yifan	(China) Zheng Siwei (China) Huang Yaqiong
2020	(Japan) Kento Momota	(Chinese Taipei) Tai Tzu-ying	(Indonesia) Marcus Fernaldi Gideon (Indonesia) Kevin Sanjaya Sukamuljo	(China) Chen Qingchen (China) Jia Yifan	(China) Zheng Siwei (China) Huang Yaqiong
2021	(Denmark) Viktor Axelsen	(Chinese Taipei) Tai Tzu-ying	(Indonesia) Marcus Fernaldi Gideon (Indonesia) Kevin Sanjaya Sukamuljo	(China) Chen Qingchen (China) Jia Yifan	(Thailand) Dechapol Puavaranukroh (Thailand) Sapsiree Taerattanachai
2022	(Denmark) Viktor Axelsen	(Japan) Akane Yamaguchi	(Indonesia) Fajar Alfian (Indonesia) Muhammad Rian Ardianto	(China) Chen Qingchen (China) Jia Yifan	(China) Zheng Siwei (China) Huang Yaqiong
2023	(Denmark) Viktor Axelsen	(South Korea) An Se-young	(China) Liang Weikeng (China) Wang Chang	(China) Chen Qingchen (China) Jia Yifan	(China) Zheng Siwei (China) Huang Yaqiong
2024	(China) Shi Yuqi	(South Korea) An Se-young	(Denmark) Kim Astrup (Denmark) Anders Skaarup Rasmussen	(China) Liu Shengshu (China) Tan Ning	(China) Feng Yanzhe (China) Huang Dongping
2025	(China) Shi Yuqi	(South Korea) An Se-young	(South Korea) Kim Won-ho (South Korea) Seo Seung-jae	(China) Liu Shengshu (China) Tan Ning	(China) Feng Yanzhe (China) Huang Dongping
2026		(South Korea) An Se-young	(South Korea) Kim Won-ho (South Korea) Seo Seung-jae	(China) Liu Shengshu (China) Tan Ning	(China) Feng Yanzhe (China) Huang Dongping

No. 1 during every week of the year

== Number one ranked players timeline ==
The following is a list of players who have achieved the number one position since 1 October 2009 (active players in light yellow, and current number 1 players are marked in bold):

Last updated: November 17, 2026

NOTE: BWF froze the World Rankings from 18 March 2020 to 2 February 2021 due to the COVID-19 pandemic.

=== Men's singles ===
#		Player	Date started	Date ended	Consecutive weeks	Total weeks
1	(Malaysia)	Lee Chong Wei	1 October 2009	20 June 2012	142	(142)
2	(China)	Lin Dan	21 June 2012	26 September 2012	14	**14**
	(Malaysia)	Lee Chong Wei	27 September 2012	24 December 2014	117	(259)
3	(China)	Chen Long	25 December 2014	8 June 2016	76	**76**
	(Malaysia)	Lee Chong Wei	9 June 2016	24 May 2017	50	(309)
4	(South Korea)	Son Wan-ho	25 May 2017	30 May 2017	1	(1)
	(Malaysia)	Lee Chong Wei	1 June 2017	7 June 2017	1	**310**
	(South Korea)	Son Wan-ho	8 June 2017	27 September 2017	16	**17**
5	(Denmark)	Viktor Axelsen	28 September 2017	11 April 2018	28	(28)
6	(India)	Srikanth Kidambi	12 April 2018	18 April 2018	1	**1**
	(Denmark)	Viktor Axelsen	19 April 2018	26 September 2018	23	(51)
7	(Japan)	Kento Momota	27 September 2018	29 November 2021	121	**121**
	(Denmark)	Viktor Axelsen	30 November 2021	10 June 2024	132	**183**
8	(China)	Shi Yuqi	11 June 2024	2 June 2025	51	(51)
9	(Thailand)	Kunlavut Vitidsarn	3 June 2025	28 July 2025	8	(8)
	(China)	Shi Yuqi	29 July 2025	9 March 2026	32	(83)
	(Thailand)	Kunlavut Vitidsarn	10 March 2026	13 April 2026	5	(13)
	(China)	Shi Yuqi	14 April 2026	24 August 2026	19	**102**
10	(Indonesia)	Jonatan Christie	25 August 2026	28 September 2026	5	**5**
	(Thailand)	Kunlavut Vitidsarn	29 September 2026	26 October 2026	4	**17**
11	(France)	**Christo Popov**	27 October 2026		4	**4**

=== Women's singles ===
#		Player	Date started	Date ended	Consecutive weeks	Total weeks
1	(China)	Wang Lin	1 October 2009	28 October 2009	4	**4**
2	(China)	Wang Yihan	29 October 2009	22 September 2010	47	(47)
3	(China)	Wang Xin	23 September 2010	1 December 2010	10	(10)
4	(Denmark)	Tine Baun	2 December 2010	8 December 2010	1	**1**
	(China)	Wang Yihan	9 December 2010	15 December 2010	1	(48)
	(China)	Wang Xin	16 December 2010	12 January 2011	4	**14**
5	(China)	Wang Shixian	13 January 2011	19 January 2011	1	(1)
	(China)	Wang Yihan	20 January 2011	26 January 2011	1	(49)
	(China)	Wang Shixian	27 January 2011	17 August 2011	29	(30)
	(China)	Wang Yihan	18 August 2011	2 November 2011	11	(60)
	(China)	Wang Shixian	3 November 2011	23 November 2011	3	**33**
	(China)	Wang Yihan	24 November 2011	19 December 2012	56	**116**
6	(China)	Li Xuerui	20 December 2012	1 April 2015	119	(119)
7	(India)	Saina Nehwal	2 April 2015	8 April 2015	1	(1)
	(China)	Li Xuerui	9 April 2015	15 April 2015	1	(120)
	(India)	Saina Nehwal	16 April 2015	29 April 2015	2	(3)
	(China)	Li Xuerui	30 April 2015	20 May 2015	3	(123)
	(India)	Saina Nehwal	21 May 2015	3 June 2015	2	(5)
	(China)	Li Xuerui	4 June 2015	10 June 2015	1	**124**
8	(Spain)	Carolina Marín	11 June 2015	20 August 2015	10	(10)
	(India)	Saina Nehwal	21 August 2015	20 October 2015	9	**14**
	(Spain)	Carolina Marín	21 October 2015	20 April 2016	26	(36)
9	(Thailand)	Ratchanok Intanon	21 April 2016	4 May 2016	2	**2**
	(Spain)	Carolina Marín	5 May 2016	30 November 2016	30	**66**
10	(Chinese Taipei)	Tai Tzu-ying	1 December 2016	18 April 2018	72	(72)
11	(Japan)	Akane Yamaguchi	19 April 2018	2 May 2018	2	(2)
	(Chinese Taipei)	Tai Tzu-ying	3 May 2018	29 July 2019	65	(137)
	(Japan)	Akane Yamaguchi	30 July 2019	23 September 2019	8	(10)
	(Chinese Taipei)	Tai Tzu-ying	24 September 2019	28 October 2019	5	(142)
12	(Japan)	Nozomi Okuhara	29 October 2019	11 November 2019	2	**2**
	(Chinese Taipei)	Tai Tzu-ying	12 November 2019	16 December 2019	5	(147)
13	(China)	Chen Yufei	17 December 2019	16 March 2020	13	(13)
	(Chinese Taipei)	Tai Tzu-ying	17 March 2020	2 May 2022	66	(213)
	(Japan)	Akane Yamaguchi	3 May 2022	29 August 2022	17	(27)
	(Chinese Taipei)	Tai Tzu-ying	30 August 2022	5 September 2022	1	**214**
	(Japan)	Akane Yamaguchi	6 September 2022	31 July 2023	47	**74**
14	(South Korea)	An Se-young	1 August 2023	7 October 2024	62	(62)
	(China)	Chen Yufei	8 October 2024	21 October 2024	2	**15**
	(South Korea)	**An Se-young**	22 October 2024		110	**172**

=== Men's doubles ===
#		Player	Date started	Date ended	Consecutive weeks	Total weeks
1	(Indonesia)	Markis Kido	1 October 2009	28 October 2009	4	**4**
1	(Indonesia)	Hendra Setiawan	1 October 2009	28 October 2009	4	**4**
2	(Malaysia)	Koo Kien Keat	29 October 2009	10 November 2010	54	**54**
2	(Malaysia)	Tan Boon Heong	29 October 2009	10 November 2010	54	**54**
3	(Denmark)	Mathias Boe	11 November 2010	22 June 2011	32	(32)
3	(Denmark)	Carsten Mogensen	11 November 2010	22 June 2011	32	(32)
4	(China)	Cai Yun	23 June 2011	20 June 2012	52	(52)
4	(China)	Fu Haifeng	23 June 2011	20 June 2012	52	(52)
5	(South Korea)	Jung Jae-sung	21 June 2012	8 August 2012	7	(7)
5	(South Korea)	Lee Yong-dae	21 June 2012	8 August 2012	7	(7)
	(China)	Cai Yun	9 August 2012	15 August 2012	1	(53)
	(China)	Fu Haifeng	9 August 2012	15 August 2012	1	(53)
	(South Korea)	Jung Jae-sung	16 August 2012	19 September 2012	5	(12)
	(South Korea)	Lee Yong-dae	16 August 2012	19 September 2012	5	(12)
	(China)	Cai Yun	20 September 2012	26 September 2012	1	**54**
	(China)	Fu Haifeng	20 September 2012	26 September 2012	1	**54**
	(South Korea)	Jung Jae-sung	27 September 2012	31 October 2012	5	**17**
	(South Korea)	Lee Yong-dae	27 September 2012	31 October 2012	5	**17**
	(Denmark)	Mathias Boe	1 November 2012	29 May 2013	30	(62)
	(Denmark)	Carsten Mogensen	1 November 2012	29 May 2013	30	(62)
6	(South Korea)	Ko Sung-hyun	30 May 2013	20 November 2013	25	**25**
6	(South Korea)	Lee Yong-dae	30 May 2013	20 November 2013	25	**25**
7	(Indonesia)	Mohammad Ahsan	21 November 2013	13 August 2014	38	**38**
7	(Indonesia)	Hendra Setiawan	21 November 2013	13 August 2014	38	**38**
8	(South Korea)	Lee Yong-dae	14 August 2014	9 November 2016	117	**117**
8	(South Korea)	Yoo Yeon-seong	14 August 2014	9 November 2016	117	**117**
9	(Malaysia)	Goh V Shem	10 November 2016	15 March 2017	18	**18**
9	(Malaysia)	Tan Wee Kiong	10 November 2016	15 March 2017	18	**18**
10	(Indonesia)	Marcus Fernaldi Gideon	16 March 2017	5 April 2017	3	(3)
10	(Indonesia)	Kevin Sanjaya Sukamuljo	16 March 2017	5 April 2017	3	(3)
11	(China)	Li Junhui	6 April 2017	12 April 2017	1	(1)
11	(China)	Liu Yuchen	6 April 2017	12 April 2017	1	(1)
	(Indonesia)	Marcus Fernaldi Gideon	13 April 2017	14 June 2017	9	(12)
	(Indonesia)	Kevin Sanjaya Sukamuljo	13 April 2017	14 June 2017	9	(12)
	(Denmark)	Mathias Boe	15 June 2017	21 June 2017	1	(63)
	(Denmark)	Carsten Mogensen	15 June 2017	21 June 2017	1	(63)
	(China)	Li Junhui	22 June 2017	5 July 2017	2	(3)
	(China)	Liu Yuchen	22 June 2017	5 July 2017	2	(3)
	(Denmark)	Mathias Boe	6 July 2017	12 July 2017	1	(64)
	(Denmark)	Carsten Mogensen	6 July 2017	12 July 2017	1	(64)
	(China)	Li Junhui	13 July 2017	30 August 2017	7	**10**
	(China)	Liu Yuchen	13 July 2017	30 August 2017	7	**10**
	(Denmark)	Mathias Boe	31 August 2017	27 September 2017	4	**68**
	(Denmark)	Carsten Mogensen	31 August 2017	27 September 2017	4	**68**
	(Indonesia)	Marcus Fernaldi Gideon	28 September 2017	19 September 2022	215	**227**
	(Indonesia)	Kevin Sanjaya Sukamuljo	28 September 2017	19 September 2022	215	**227**
12	(Japan)	Takuro Hoki	20 September 2022	26 December 2022	14	**14**
12	(Japan)	Yugo Kobayashi	20 September 2022	26 December 2022	14	**14**
13	(Indonesia)	Fajar Alfian	27 December 2022	10 October 2023	41	**41**
13	(Indonesia)	Muhammad Rian Ardianto	27 December 2022	10 October 2023	41	**41**
14	(India)	Satwiksairaj Rankireddy	10 October 2023	31 October 2023	3	(3)
14	(India)	Chirag Shetty	10 October 2023	31 October 2023	3	(3)
15	(China)	Liang Weikeng	31 October 2023	22 January 2024	12	(12)
15	(China)	Wang Chang	31 October 2023	22 January 2024	12	(12)
	(India)	Satwiksairaj Rankireddy	23 January 2024	15 April 2024	12	(15)
	(India)	Chirag Shetty	23 January 2024	15 April 2024	12	(15)
	(China)	Liang Weikeng	16 April 2024	20 May 2024	5	(17)
	(China)	Wang Chang	16 April 2024	20 May 2024	5	(17)
	(India)	Satwiksairaj Rankireddy	21 May 2024	10 June 2024	3	**18**
	(India)	Chirag Shetty	21 May 2024	10 June 2024	3	**18**
	(China)	Liang Weikeng	11 June 2024	16 December 2024	27	**44**
	(China)	Wang Chang	11 June 2024	16 December 2024	27	**44**
16	(Denmark)	Kim Astrup	17 December 2024	26 May 2025	23	**23**
16	(Denmark)	Anders Skaarup Rasmussen	17 December 2024	26 May 2025	23	**23**
17	(Malaysia)	Goh Sze Fei	27 May 2025	21 July 2025	8	**8**
17	(Malaysia)	Nur Izzuddin	27 May 2025	21 July 2025	8	**8**
18	(South Korea)	**Kim Won-ho**	22 July 2025		70	**70**
18	(South Korea)	**Seo Seung-jae**	22 July 2025		70	**70**

=== Women's doubles ===
#		Player	Date started	Date ended	Consecutive weeks	Total weeks
1	(China)	Zhao Tingting	1 October 2009	4 November 2009	5	**5**
1	(China)	Zhang Yawen	1 October 2009	4 November 2009	5	**5**
2	(China)	Cheng Shu	5 November 2009	18 November 2009	2	**2**
2	(China)	Zhao Yunlei	5 November 2009	18 November 2009	2	**2**
3	(China)	Du Jing	19 November 2009	25 November 2009	1	(1)
3	(China)	Yu Yang	19 November 2009	25 November 2009	1	(1)
4	(China)	Ma Jin	26 November 2009	27 January 2010	9	(9)
4	(China)	Wang Xiaoli	26 November 2009	27 January 2010	9	(9)
	(China)	Du Jing	28 January 2010	24 March 2010	8	**9**
	(China)	Yu Yang	28 January 2010	24 March 2010	8	**9**
	(China)	Ma Jin	25 March 2010	29 September 2010	27	**36**
	(China)	Wang Xiaoli	25 March 2010	29 September 2010	27	**36**
5	(Chinese Taipei)	Cheng Wen-hsing	30 September 2010	27 April 2011	30	**30**
5	(Chinese Taipei)	Chien Yu-chin	30 September 2010	27 April 2011	30	**30**
6	(China)	Wang Xiaoli	28 April 2011	19 September 2012	73	(73)
6	(China)	Yu Yang	28 April 2011	19 September 2012	73	(73)
7	(China)	Tian Qing	20 September 2012	13 March 2013	25	(25)
7	(China)	Zhao Yunlei	20 September 2012	13 March 2013	25	(25)
	(China)	Wang Xiaoli	14 March 2013	28 May 2014	63	**136**
	(China)	Yu Yang	14 March 2013	28 May 2014	63	**136**
8	(China)	Bao Yixin	29 May 2014	29 October 2014	22	**22**
8	(China)	Tang Jinhua	29 May 2014	29 October 2014	22	**22**
9	(Japan)	Misaki Matsutomo	30 October 2014	26 November 2014	4	(4)
9	(Japan)	Ayaka Takahashi	30 October 2014	26 November 2014	4	(4)
	(China)	Tian Qing	27 November 2014	1 April 2015	18	**43**
	(China)	Zhao Yunlei	27 November 2014	1 April 2015	18	**43**
	(Japan)	Misaki Matsutomo	2 April 2015	16 December 2015	37	(41)
	(Japan)	Ayaka Takahashi	2 April 2015	16 December 2015	37	(41)
10	(China)	Luo Ying	17 December 2015	16 March 2016	13	**13**
10	(China)	Luo Yu	17 December 2015	16 March 2016	13	**13**
	(Japan)	Misaki Matsutomo	17 March 2016	25 October 2017	84	(125)
	(Japan)	Ayaka Takahashi	17 March 2016	25 October 2017	84	(125)
11	(China)	Chen Qingchen	26 October 2017	8 November 2017	2	(2)
11	(China)	Jia Yifan	26 October 2017	8 November 2017	2	(2)
	(Japan)	Misaki Matsutomo	9 November 2017	22 November 2017	2	**127**
	(Japan)	Ayaka Takahashi	9 November 2017	22 November 2017	2	**127**
	(China)	Chen Qingchen	23 November 2017	20 June 2018	30	(32)
	(China)	Jia Yifan	23 November 2017	20 June 2018	30	(32)
12	(Japan)	Yuki Fukushima	21 June 2018	4 July 2018	2	(2)
12	(Japan)	Sayaka Hirota	21 June 2018	4 July 2018	2	(2)
	(China)	Chen Qingchen	5 July 2018	8 August 2018	5	(37)
	(China)	Jia Yifan	5 July 2018	8 August 2018	5	(37)
	(Japan)	Yuki Fukushima	9 August 2018	29 April 2019	38	(40)
	(Japan)	Sayaka Hirota	9 August 2018	29 April 2019	38	(40)
13	(Japan)	Mayu Matsumoto	30 April 2019	22 July 2019	12	(12)
13	(Japan)	Wakana Nagahara	30 April 2019	22 July 2019	12	(12)
	(Japan)	Yuki Fukushima	23 July 2019	29 July 2019	1	(41)
	(Japan)	Sayaka Hirota	23 July 2019	29 July 2019	1	(41)
	(Japan)	Mayu Matsumoto	30 July 2019	11 November 2019	15	**27**
	(Japan)	Wakana Nagahara	30 July 2019	11 November 2019	15	**27**
	(Japan)	Yuki Fukushima	12 November 2019	18 November 2019	1	(42)
	(Japan)	Sayaka Hirota	12 November 2019	18 November 2019	1	(42)
	(China)	Chen Qingchen	19 November 2019	1 February 2021	18	(55)
	(China)	Jia Yifan	19 November 2019	1 February 2021	18	(55)
	(Japan)	Yuki Fukushima	2 February 2021	20 December 2021	46	**88**
	(Japan)	Sayaka Hirota	2 February 2021	20 December 2021	46	**88**
	(China)	Chen Qingchen	21 December 2021	3 October 2022	41	(96)
	(China)	Jia Yifan	21 December 2021	3 October 2022	41	(96)
14	(South Korea)	Kim So-yeong	4 October 2022	24 October 2022	3	**3**
14	(South Korea)	Kong Hee-yong	4 October 2022	24 October 2022	3	**3**
	(China)	Chen Qingchen	25 October 2022	21 October 2024	104	**200**
	(China)	Jia Yifan	25 October 2022	21 October 2024	104	**200**
15	(China)	Liu Shengshu	22 October 2024	28 October 2024	1	(1)
15	(China)	Tan Ning	22 October 2024	28 October 2024	1	(1)
16	(South Korea)	Baek Ha-na	29 October 2024	18 November 2024	3	(3)
16	(South Korea)	Lee So-hee	29 October 2024	18 November 2024	3	(3)
	(China)	Liu Shengshu	19 November 2024	13 January 2025	8	(9)
	(China)	Tan Ning	19 November 2024	13 January 2025	8	(9)
	(South Korea)	Baek Ha-na	14 January 2025	17 March 2025	9	**12**
	(South Korea)	Lee So-hee	14 January 2025	17 March 2025	9	**12**
	(China)	**Liu Shengshu**	18 March 2025		88	**97**
	(China)	**Tan Ning**	18 March 2025		88	**97**

=== Mixed doubles ===
#		Player	Date started	Date ended	Consecutive weeks	Total weeks
1	(South Korea)	Lee Yong-dae	1 October 2009	20 January 2010	16	(16)
1	(South Korea)	Lee Hyo-jung	1 October 2009	20 January 2010	16	(16)
2	(China)	Zheng Bo	21 January 2010	10 March 2010	7	**7**
2	(China)	Ma Jin	21 January 2010	10 March 2010	7	**7**
3	(Indonesia)	Nova Widianto	11 March 2010	24 March 2010	2	(2)
3	(Indonesia)	Liliyana Natsir	11 March 2010	24 March 2010	2	(2)
	(South Korea)	Lee Yong-dae	25 March 2010	21 April 2010	4	(20)
	(South Korea)	Lee Hyo-jung	25 March 2010	21 April 2010	4	(20)
	(Indonesia)	Nova Widianto	22 April 2010	26 May 2010	5	(7)
	(Indonesia)	Liliyana Natsir	22 April 2010	26 May 2010	5	(7)
	(South Korea)	Lee Yong-dae	27 May 2010	23 June 2010	4	**24**
	(South Korea)	Lee Hyo-jung	27 May 2010	23 June 2010	4	**24**
4	(Denmark)	Thomas Laybourn	24 June 2010	30 June 2010	1	(1)
4	(Denmark)	Kamilla Rytter Juhl	24 June 2010	30 June 2010	1	(1)
	(Indonesia)	Nova Widianto	1 July 2010	25 August 2010	8	(15)
	(Indonesia)	Liliyana Natsir	1 July 2010	25 August 2010	8	(15)
5	(Poland)	Robert Mateusiak	26 August 2010	1 September 2010	1	**1**
5	(Poland)	Nadieżda Zięba	26 August 2010	1 September 2010	1	**1**
	(Indonesia)	Nova Widianto	2 September 2010	3 November 2010	9	**24**
	(Indonesia)	Liliyana Natsir	2 September 2010	3 November 2010	9	**24**
	(Denmark)	Thomas Laybourn	4 November 2010	2 February 2011	13	**14**
	(Denmark)	Kamilla Rytter Juhl	4 November 2010	2 February 2011	13	**14**
6	(China)	Zhang Nan	3 February 2011	15 August 2012	80	(80)
6	(China)	Zhao Yunlei	3 February 2011	15 August 2012	80	(80)
7	(China)	Xu Chen	16 August 2012	18 September 2013	57	**57**
7	(China)	Ma Jin	16 August 2012	18 September 2013	57	**57**
	(China)	Zhang Nan	19 September 2013	1 April 2015	80	(160)
	(China)	Zhao Yunlei	19 September 2013	1 April 2015	80	(160)
8	(Denmark)	Joachim Fischer Nielsen	2 April 2015	8 April 2015	1	**1**
8	(Denmark)	Christinna Pedersen	2 April 2015	8 April 2015	1	**1**
	(China)	Zhang Nan	9 April 2015	21 September 2016	76	**236**
	(China)	Zhao Yunlei	9 April 2015	21 September 2016	76	**236**
9	(South Korea)	Ko Sung-hyun	22 September 2016	21 December 2016	13	**13**
9	(South Korea)	Kim Ha-na	22 September 2016	21 December 2016	13	**13**
10	(China)	Zheng Siwei	22 December 2016	11 April 2018	68	(68)
10	(China)	Chen Qingchen	22 December 2016	11 April 2018	68	(68)
11	(China)	Wang Yilyu	12 April 2018	25 April 2018	2	(2)
11	(China)	Huang Dongping	12 April 2018	25 April 2018	2	(2)
	(China)	Zheng Siwei	26 April 2018	2 May 2018	1	**69**
	(China)	Chen Qingchen	26 April 2018	2 May 2018	1	**69**
12	(Indonesia)	Tontowi Ahmad	3 May 2018	20 June 2018	7	(7)
12	(Indonesia)	Liliyana Natsir	3 May 2018	20 June 2018	7	(7)
	(China)	Wang Yilyu	21 June 2018	11 July 2018	3	**5**
	(China)	Huang Dongping	21 June 2018	11 July 2018	3	**5**
	(Indonesia)	Tontowi Ahmad	12 July 2018	8 August 2018	4	**11**
	(Indonesia)	Liliyana Natsir	12 July 2018	8 August 2018	4	**11**
13	(China)	Zheng Siwei	9 August 2018	6 December 2021	129	(129)
13	(China)	Huang Yaqiong	9 August 2018	6 December 2021	129	(129)
14	(Thailand)	Dechapol Puavaranukroh	7 December 2021	20 June 2022	28	(28)
14	(Thailand)	Sapsiree Taerattanachai	7 December 2021	20 June 2022	28	(28)
	(China)	Zheng Siwei	21 June 2022	15 August 2022	8	(137)
	(China)	Huang Yaqiong	21 June 2022	15 August 2022	8	(137)
	(Thailand)	Dechapol Puavaranukroh	16 August 2022	7 November 2022	12	(40)
	(Thailand)	Sapsiree Taerattanachai	16 August 2022	7 November 2022	12	(40)
15	(Japan)	Yuta Watanabe	8 November 2022	14 November 2022	1	**1**
15	(Japan)	Arisa Higashino	8 November 2022	14 November 2022	1	**1**
	(China)	Zheng Siwei	15 November 2022	28 November 2022	2	(139)
	(China)	Huang Yaqiong	15 November 2022	28 November 2022	2	(139)
	(Thailand)	Dechapol Puavaranukroh	29 November 2022	12 December 2022	2	**42**
	(Thailand)	Sapsiree Taerattanachai	29 November 2022	12 December 2022	2	**42**
	(China)	Zheng Siwei	13 December 2022	25 November 2024	102	**241**
	(China)	Huang Yaqiong	13 December 2022	25 November 2024	102	**241**
16	(China)	Feng Yanzhe	26 November 2024	17 March 2025	16	(16)
16	(China)	Huang Dongping	26 November 2024	17 March 2025	16	(16)
17	(China)	Jiang Zhenbang	18 March 2025	26 May 2025	10	(10)
17	(China)	Wei Yaxin	18 March 2025	26 May 2025	10	(10)
	(China)	Feng Yanzhe	27 May 2025	1 September 2025	14	(30)
	(China)	Huang Dongping	27 May 2025	1 September 2025	14	(30)
	(China)	Jiang Zhenbang	2 September 2025	15 September 2025	2	(12)
	(China)	Wei Yaxin	2 September 2025	15 September 2025	2	(12)
	(China)	Feng Yanzhe	16 September 2025	22 September 2025	1	(31)
	(China)	Huang Dongping	16 September 2025	22 September 2025	1	(31)
	(China)	Jiang Zhenbang	23 September 2025	15 December 2025	12	**24**
	(China)	Wei Yaxin	23 September 2025	15 December 2025	12	**24**
	(China)	**Feng Yanzhe**	16 December 2025		49	**80**
	(China)	**Huang Dongping**	16 December 2025		49	**80**

== Players with highest career rank 2–5 ==
Last update: 10 November 2026

The following is a list of players who were ranked world no. 5 or higher but not no. 1 in the period since the introduction of the BWF computer rankings (active players in light green):

=== Men's singles ===
NOC	Player	Date reached
World number 2
(China)	Chen Jin	25 March 2010
(Denmark)	Peter Gade	9 December 2010
(Denmark)	Jan Ø. Jørgensen	22 January 2015
(Chinese Taipei)	Chou Tien-chen	6 August 2019
(Denmark)	Anders Antonsen	27 September 2022
(Malaysia)	Lee Zii Jia	25 October 2022
(Indonesia)	Anthony Sinisuka Ginting	24 January 2023
(Japan)	Kodai Naraoka	12 December 2023
World number 3
(Indonesia)	Simon Santoso	26 August 2010
(China)	Du Pengyu	17 January 2013
(Japan)	Kenichi Tago	31 October 2013
(Indonesia)	Tommy Sugiarto	19 December 2013
(Singapore)	Loh Kean Yew	8 November 2022
(China)	Li Shifeng	31 October 2023
World number 4
(Thailand)	Boonsak Ponsana	2 December 2010
(Indonesia)	Sony Dwi Kuncoro	24 January 2013
(Hong Kong)	Hu Yun	30 May 2013
(France)	Alex Lanier	27 October 2026
(Canada)	Victor Lai	10 November 2026
World number 5
(Vietnam)	Nguyễn Tiến Minh	2 December 2010

=== Women's singles ===
NOC	Player	Date reached
World number 2
(Hong Kong)	Zhou Mi	1 October 2009
(Germany)	Juliane Schenk	20 June 2013
(South Korea)	Sung Ji-hyun	16 March 2017
(India)	P. V. Sindhu	6 April 2017
(China)	Wang Zhiyi	19 November 2024
World number 3
(China)	Jiang Yanjiao	21 January 2010
(China)	Han Yue	18 March 2025
World number 4
(France)	Pi Hongyan	19 November 2009
(China)	Sun Yu	22 December 2016
World number 5
(China)	Lu Lan	21 January 2010
(China)	Liu Xin	14 April 2011
(South Korea)	Bae Yeon-ju	2 June 2011
(China)	He Bingjiao	15 November 2022
(Indonesia)	Gregoria Mariska Tunjung	14 January 2025

=== Men's doubles ===
NOC	Player	Date reached
World number 2
(South Korea)	Ko Sung-hyun	3 February 2011
(South Korea)	Yoo Yeon-seong	3 February 2011
(Japan)	Hiroyuki Endo	6 March 2014
(Japan)	Kenichi Hayakawa	6 March 2014
(China)	Fu Haifeng	25 August 2016
(China)	Zhang Nan	25 August 2016
(South Korea)	Kim Gi-jung	22 September 2016
(South Korea)	Kim Sa-rang	22 September 2016
(China)	Chai Biao	6 October 2016
(China)	Hong Wei	6 October 2016
(Japan)	Takeshi Kamura	26 January 2017
(Japan)	Keigo Sonoda	26 January 2017
(China)	Liu Cheng	21 June 2018
(China)	Zhang Nan	21 June 2018
(Chinese Taipei)	Lee Yang	27 September 2022
(Chinese Taipei)	Wang Chi-lin	27 September 2022
(Malaysia)	Aaron Chia	24 January 2023
(Malaysia)	Soh Wooi Yik	24 January 2023
(China)	Liu Yuchen	30 May 2023
(China)	Ou Xuanyi	30 May 2023
(South Korea)	Kang Min-hyuk	20 February 2024
(South Korea)	Seo Seung-jae	20 February 2024
(Indonesia)	Fajar Alfian	2 June 2026
(Indonesia)	Muhammad Shohibul Fikri	2 June 2026
World number 3
(China)	Guo Zhendong	1 July 2010
(China)	Xu Chen	1 July 2010
(Chinese Taipei)	Fang Chieh-min	9 December 2010
(Chinese Taipei)	Lee Sheng-mu	9 December 2010
(South Korea)	Ko Sung-hyun	22 January 2015
(South Korea)	Shin Baek-cheol	22 January 2015
(Chinese Taipei)	Lee Sheng-mu	19 March 2015
(Chinese Taipei)	Tsai Chia-hsin	19 March 2015
World number 4
(China)	Hong Wei	17 January 2013
(China)	Shen Ye	17 January 2013
(China)	Liu Xiaolong	19 March 2015
(China)	Qiu Zihan	19 March 2015
(Denmark)	Mads Conrad-Petersen	21 June 2018
(Denmark)	Mads Pieler Kolding	21 June 2018
(Chinese Taipei)	Chen Hung-ling	25 October 2018
(Chinese Taipei)	Wang Chi-lin	25 October 2018
(Japan)	Hiroyuki Endo	5 March 2019
(Japan)	Yuta Watanabe	5 March 2019
(China)	He Jiting	22 October 2024
(China)	Ren Xiangyu	22 October 2024
(Malaysia)	Man Wei Chong	15 December 2025
(Malaysia)	Tee Kai Wun	15 December 2025
World number 5
(Indonesia)	Alvent Yulianto	26 November 2009
(Indonesia)	Hendra Aprida Gunawan	26 November 2009
(China)	Chai Biao	22 December 2011
(China)	Guo Zhendong	22 December 2011
(Indonesia)	Mohammad Ahsan	9 August 2012
(Indonesia)	Bona Septano	9 August 2012
(China)	Han Chengkai	9 April 2019
(China)	Zhou Haodong	9 April 2019

=== Women's doubles ===
NOC	Player	Date reached
World number 2
(Malaysia)	Chin Eei Hui	1 October 2009
(Malaysia)	Wong Pei Tty	1 October 2009
(South Korea)	Ha Jung-eun	5 November 2009
(South Korea)	Kim Min-jung	5 November 2009
(Japan)	Miyuki Maeda	11 November 2010
(Japan)	Satoko Suetsuna	11 November 2010
(China)	Bao Yixin	1 November 2012
(China)	Zhong Qianxin	1 November 2012
(China)	Ma Jin	11 July 2013
(China)	Tang Jinhua	11 July 2013
(Denmark)	Kamilla Rytter Juhl	24 October 2013
(Denmark)	Christinna Pedersen	24 October 2013
(Indonesia)	Nitya Krishinda Maheswari	28 January 2016
(Indonesia)	Greysia Polii	28 January 2016
(China)	Tang Yuanting	14 April 2016
(China)	Yu Yang	14 April 2016
(South Korea)	Jung Kyung-eun	10 November 2016
(South Korea)	Shin Seung-chan	10 November 2016
(South Korea)	Chang Ye-na	9 November 2017
(South Korea)	Lee So-hee	9 November 2017
(South Korea)	Lee So-hee	21 December 2021
(South Korea)	Shin Seung-chan	21 December 2021
(Japan)	Nami Matsuyama	8 November 2022
(Japan)	Chiharu Shida	8 November 2022
(China)	Zhang Shuxian	23 May 2023
(China)	Zheng Yu	23 May 2023
(Malaysia)	Pearly Tan	29 July 2025
(Malaysia)	Thinaah Muralitharan	29 July 2025
(China)	Jia Yifan	16 June 2026
(China)	Zhang Shuxian	16 June 2026
(Japan)	Yuki Fukushima	28 July 2026
(Japan)	Mayu Matsumoto	28 July 2026
World number 3
(Bulgaria)	Petya Nedelcheva	25 November 2010
(Russia)	Anastasia Russkikh	25 November 2010
(Japan)	Mizuki Fujii	5 January 2012
(Japan)	Reika Kakiiwa	5 January 2012
(Japan)	Shizuka Matsuo	25 April 2013
(Japan)	Mami Naito	25 April 2013
(Indonesia)	Greysia Polii	20 September 2018
(Indonesia)	Apriyani Rahayu	20 September 2018
(South Korea)	Jeong Na-eun	27 December 2022
(South Korea)	Kim Hye-jeong	27 December 2022
(South Korea)	Kim Hye-jeong	21 October 2025
(South Korea)	Kong Hee-yong	21 October 2025
World number 4
(South Korea)	Lee Hyo-jung	26 November 2009
(South Korea)	Lee Kyung-won	26 November 2009
(Russia)	Valeria Sorokina	16 December 2010
(Russia)	Nina Vislova	16 December 2010
(Thailand)	Duanganong Aroonkesorn	13 January 2011
(Thailand)	Kunchala Voravichitchaikul	13 January 2011
(South Korea)	Chang Ye-na	14 August 2014
(South Korea)	Kim So-yeong	14 August 2014
(Japan)	Shiho Tanaka	31 May 2018
(Japan)	Koharu Yonemoto	31 May 2018
(Indonesia)	Apriyani Rahayu	18 April 2023
(Indonesia)	Siti Fadia Silva Ramadhanti	18 April 2023
(Japan)	Rin Iwanaga	11 March 2025
(Japan)	Kie Nakanishi	11 March 2025
World number 5
(China)	Pan Pan	16 December 2010
(China)	Tian Qing	16 December 2010
(Indonesia)	Greysia Polii	12 May 2011
(Indonesia)	Meiliana Jauhari	12 May 2011
(South Korea)	Eom Hye-won	25 April 2013
(South Korea)	Chang Ye-na	25 April 2013
(South Korea)	Jung Kyung-eun	26 September 2013
(South Korea)	Kim Ha-na	26 September 2013
(Japan)	Reika Kakiiwa	17 April 2014
(Japan)	Miyuki Maeda	17 April 2014
(China)	Du Yue	17 March 2020
(China)	Li Yinhui	17 March 2020
(Thailand)	Jongkolphan Kititharakul	20 December 2022
(Thailand)	Rawinda Prajongjai	20 December 2022
(China)	Li Yijing	27 May 2025
(China)	Luo Xumin	27 May 2025

=== Mixed doubles ===
NOC	Player	Date reached
World number 2
(Indonesia)	Hendra Aprida Gunawan	26 August 2010
(Indonesia)	Vita Marissa	26 August 2010
(Thailand)	Sudket Prapakamol	9 December 2010
(Thailand)	Saralee Thungthongkam	9 December 2010
(China)	Tao Jiaming	18 August 2011
(China)	Tian Qing	18 August 2011
(Indonesia)	Praveen Jordan	27 October 2016
(Indonesia)	Debby Susanto	27 October 2016
(China)	Lu Kai	13 April 2017
(China)	Huang Yaqiong	13 April 2017
(Hong Kong)	Tang Chun Man	21 June 2018
(Hong Kong)	Tse Ying Suet	21 June 2018
(South Korea)	Seo Seung-jae	12 March 2024
(South Korea)	Chae Yoo-jung	12 March 2024
(Thailand)	Dechapol Puavaranukroh	25 August 2026
(Thailand)	Supissara Paewsampran	25 August 2026
(Denmark)	Mathias Christiansen	8 September 2026
(Denmark)	Alexandra Bøje	8 September 2026
World number 3
(Malaysia)	Chan Peng Soon	22 November 2012
(Malaysia)	Goh Liu Ying	22 November 2012
(China)	Liu Cheng	2 April 2015
(China)	Bao Yixin	2 April 2015
(South Korea)	Kim Won-ho	31 December 2024
(South Korea)	Jeong Na-eun	31 December 2024
(Malaysia)	Chen Tang Jie	14 January 2025
(Malaysia)	Toh Ee Wei	14 January 2025
(Malaysia)	Goh Soon Huat	18 February 2025
(Malaysia)	Shevon Jemie Lai	18 February 2025
(France)	Thom Gicquel	27 October 2026
(France)	Delphine Delrue	27 October 2026
World number 4
(China)	He Hanbin	29 October 2009
(China)	Yu Yang	29 October 2009
(South Korea)	Ko Sung-hyun	2 June 2011
(South Korea)	Ha Jung-eun	2 June 2011
(England)	Chris Adcock	24 August 2017
(England)	Gabby Adcock	24 August 2017
(Denmark)	Mathias Christiansen	25 October 2018
(Denmark)	Christinna Pedersen	25 October 2018
(Indonesia)	Praveen Jordan	17 March 2020
(Indonesia)	Melati Daeva Oktavianti	17 March 2020
World number 5
(China)	Tao Jiaming	26 August 2010
(China)	Zhang Yawen	26 August 2010
(England)	Nathan Robertson	26 August 2010
(England)	Jenny Wallwork	26 August 2010
(Chinese Taipei)	Chen Hung-ling	3 November 2011
(Chinese Taipei)	Cheng Wen-hsing	3 November 2011
(South Korea)	Seo Seung-jae	17 May 2018
(South Korea)	Kim Ha-na	17 May 2018
(Malaysia)	Tan Kian Meng	20 December 2022
(Malaysia)	Lai Pei Jing	20 December 2022
(China)	Guo Xinwa	18 March 2025
(China)	Chen Fanghui	18 March 2025
