= 2018 Badminton Asia Junior Championships – Girls' singles =

Tournament details
- Dates: 18–22 July 2017
- Edition: 21
- Venue: Jaya Raya Sports Hall Training Center
- Location: Jakarta, Indonesia

The girls' singles tournament of the 2018 Badminton Asia Junior Championships was held from July 18 to 22. The girls' singles champion of the last edition was Han Yue from China. The silver medallist in the last edition, Phittayaporn Chaiwan top the seedings this year. China has placed 3 girls (Wang Zhiyi, Zhou Meng, and Wei Yaxin) to fill out the remainder of the top 4 seeded positions.

== Seeded ==
1. (Thailand) Phittayaporn Chaiwan (quarterfinals)
2. (China) Wang Zhiyi (champion)
3. (China) Zhou Meng (final)
4. (China) Wei Yaxin (semifinals)
5. (Thailand) Chasinee Korepap (second round)
6. (Chinese Taipei) Hsieh Yu-ying (third round)
7. (India) Aakarshi Kashyap (second round)
8. (South Korea) Park Ga-eun (quarterfinals)

== Draw ==
=== Finals ===
Quarterfinals
1	(Thailand) Phittayaporn Chaiwan	8	22	7
(Japan) Hirari Mizui	21	20	21
3	(China) Zhou Meng	21	21
(Thailand) Benyapa Aimsaard	19	8
8	(South Korea) Park Ga-eun	16	21	12
4	(China) Wei Yaxin	21	16	21
(South Korea) Lee So-yul	14	18
2	(China) Wang Zhiyi	21	21

Semifinals
(Japan) Hirari Mizui	19	21	18
3	(China) Zhou Meng	21	18	21
4	(China) Wei Yaxin	14	12
2	(China) Wang Zhiyi	21	21

Final
3	(China) Zhou Meng	9	8
2	(China) Wang Zhiyi	21	21

=== Top half ===
==== Section 1 ====
First round
(Mongolia) K Darkhanbaatar
(Malaysia) Eoon Q X	w	/	o
(Sri Lanka) T A Ratnayaka
(Hong Kong) Leung Y Y	w	/	o
(Macau) Cheong I T	1	5
(South Korea) Yoon S-j	21	21
(India) D Kuity	21	21
(Kazakhstan) A Zhumabek	18	13
(China) Qiu ZY	19	8
(Japan) H Mizui	21	21
(Indonesia) S Widjaja	21	21
(Singapore) F Low	9	10

Second round
1	(Thailand) P Chaiwan	21	21
(Malaysia) Eoon Q X	19	19
(Hong Kong) Leung Y Y	18	22	21
(South Korea) Yoon S-j	21	20	10
6	(Chinese Taipei) Hsieh Y-y	22	21
(India) D Kuity	20	9
(Japan) H Mizui	21	21
(Indonesia) S Widjaja	16	14

Third round
1	(Thailand) P Chaiwan	21	21
(Hong Kong) Leung Y Y	9	15
6	(Chinese Taipei) Hsieh Y-y	15	14
(Japan) H Mizui	21	21

Quarterfinal
1	(Thailand) P Chaiwan	8	22	7
(Japan) H Mizui	21	20	21

==== Section 2 ====
First round
(Japan) A Kurihara	21	21
(Macau) Wong C W	8	9
(South Korea) Kim S-m	21	21
(Iran) P Eskandari	9	8
(Myanmar) Zar K T	9	9
(Indonesia) Y E Setiawan	21	21
(Hong Kong) Lui L L	11	8
(Thailand) B Aimsaard	21	21
(Indonesia) P K Wardani	14	21	21
(Chinese Taipei) Kuo Y-c	21	5	9
(Singapore) I Khan	20	21	21
(Malaysia) Go P K	22	8	18

Second round
3	(China) Zhou M	21	18	21
(Japan) A Kurihara	19	21	16
(South Korea) Kim S-m	21	19	21
(Indonesia) Y E Setiawan	17	21	19
7	(India) A Kashyap	18	17
(Thailand) B Aimsaard	21	21
(Indonesia) P K Wardani	19	13
(Singapore) I Khan	21	21

Third round
3	(China) Zhou M	21	21
(South Korea) Kim S-m	17	13
(Thailand) B Aimsaard	21	13	21
(Singapore) I Khan	18	21	14

Quarterfinal
3	(China) Zhou M	21	21
(Thailand) B Aimsaard	19	8

=== Bottom half ===
==== Section 3 ====
First round
(Sri Lanka) J Amanda	21	21
(Macau) Chio W U	7	14
(Hong Kong) S S Mehta	16	21	23
(Malaysia) M M Khairul	21	18	21
(Japan) R Gunji	21	22	14
(Indonesia) A R Mulyani	14	24	21
(Indonesia) O C M Kambey	21	19
(Chinese Taipei) Tung C-t	23	21
(Myanmar) Seng J N	5	8
(India) K Selvam	21	21
(Singapore) J R Sito	17	21	18
(Thailand) K Jiantanet	21	12	21

Second round
(Sri Lanka) J Amanda	13	8
(Hong Kong) S S Mehta	21	21
(Indonesia) A R Mulyani	21	11	16
8	(South Korea) Park G-e	19	21	21
(Chinese Taipei) Tung C-t	16	17
(India) K Selvam	21	21
(Thailand) K Jiantanet	12	7
4	(China) Wei YX	21	21

Third round
(Hong Kong) S S Mehta	19	11
8	(South Korea) Park G-e	21	21
(India) K Selvam	19	8
4	(China) Wei YX	21	21

Quarterfinal
8	(South Korea) Park G-e	16	21	12
4	(China) Wei YX	21	16	21

==== Section 4 ====
First round
(South Korea) Lee S-y	21	21
(Indonesia) D A Syarafina	18	19
(Mongolia) G Baatarsuren
(Sri Lanka) D Dias	w	/	o
(Chinese Taipei) Lin S-y	21	21
(Singapore) S Loo	5	10
(India) M Shashidharan	21	21
(Kazakhstan) I Gordeyeva	9	10
(Malaysia) L Karupathevan	21	20	10
(Japan) C Uchiyama	13	22	21
(Myanmar) Wai W	6	9
(Hong Kong) Tsang H Y	21	21

Second round
(South Korea) Lee S-y	21	21
(Sri Lanka) D Dias	9	17
(Chinese Taipei) Lin S-y	21	11	21
5	(Thailand) C Korepap	19	21	16
(India) M Shashidharan	13	13
(Japan) C Uchiyama	21	21
(Hong Kong) Tsang H Y	9	13
2	(China) Wang ZY	21	21

Third round
(South Korea) Lee S-y	21	22
(Chinese Taipei) Lin S-y	9	20
(Japan) C Uchiyama	21	11	9
2	(China) Wang ZY	8	21	21

Quarterfinal
(South Korea) Lee S-y	14	18
2	(China) Wang ZY	21	21
