= Hirari Mizui =

Japanese badminton player (born 2000)

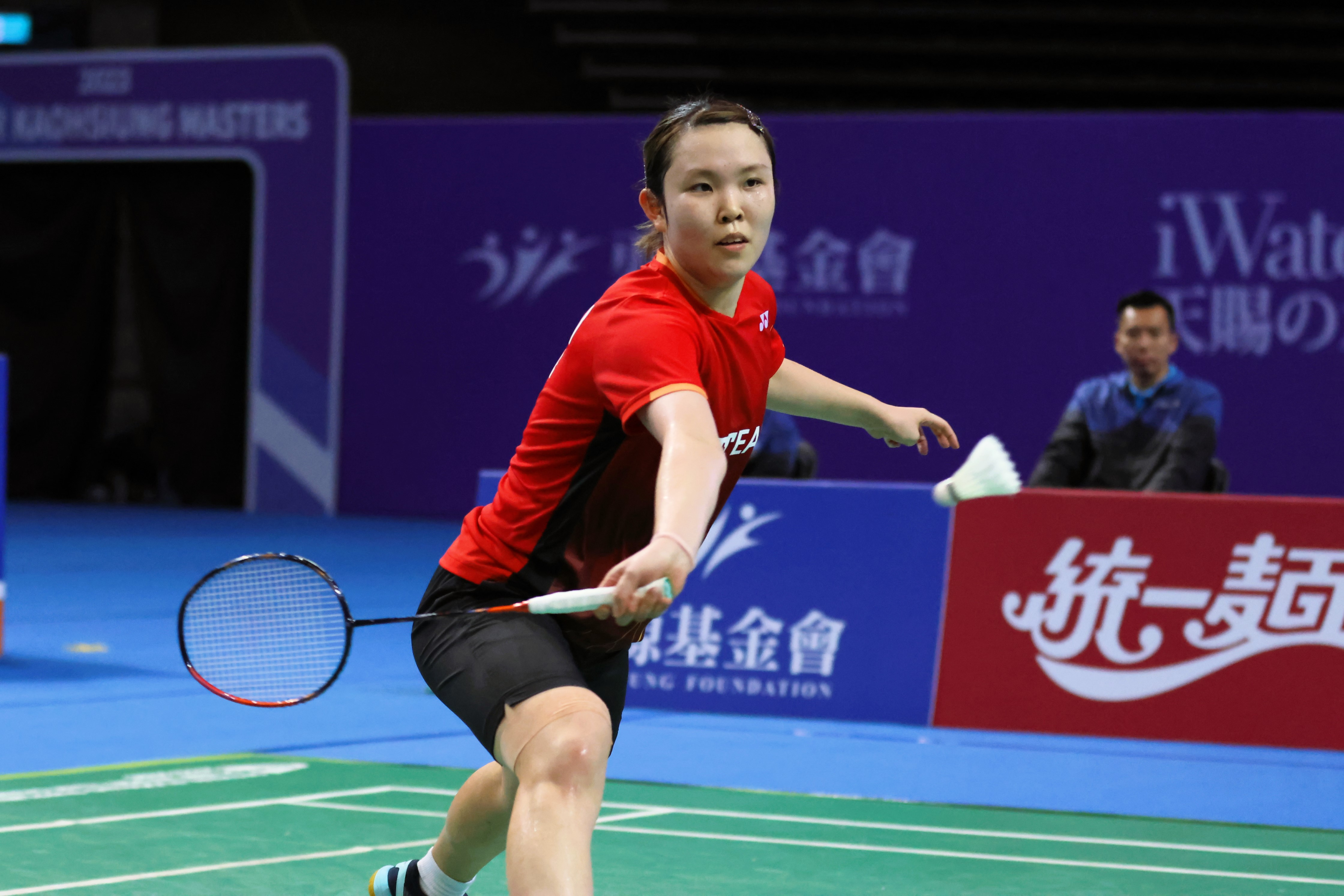
- Hirari Mizui at the 2023 Kaohsiung Masters

Personal information
- Born: 22 July 2000 (age 26) Nara Prefecture, Japan
- Years active: 2014–present
- Height: 1.64 m (5 ft 5 in)
- Weight: 58 kg (128 lb)

Sport
- Country: Japan
- Sport: Badminton
- Handedness: Right

Women's singles
- Highest ranking: 60 (31 January 2023)
- BWF profile
Medal record
Women's badminton
Representing Japan
Asia Team Championships
Bronze medal – third place	2022 Selangor	Women's team
World Junior Championships
Bronze medal – third place	2018 Markham	Mixed team
Bronze medal – third place	2017 Yogyakarta	Mixed team
Asian Junior Championships
Silver medal – second place	2018 Jakarta	Mixed team
Bronze medal – third place	2018 Jakarta	Girls' singles
Bronze medal – third place	2017 Jakarta	Mixed team
Representing (International Olympic Committee) Mixed-NOCs
Youth Olympic Games
Bronze medal – third place	2018 Buenos Aires	Mixed team

Hirari Mizui (水井 ひらり, Mizui Hirari; born 22 July 2000) is a Japanese badminton player. She graduated from Futaba Mirai School. She was the girls' singles bronze medalist at the 2018 Asian Junior Championships. Mizui participated at the 2018 Summer Youth Olympics in Buenos Aires, Argentina. She won the bronze medal in the mixed badminton team event.

== Achievements ==
=== Asian Junior Championships ===
Girls' singles
Year	Venue	Opponent	Score	Result	Ref.
2018	Jaya Raya Sports Hall Training Center; Jakarta, Indonesia	(China) Zhou Meng	19–21, 21–18, 18–21	Bronze	

=== BWF International Challenge/Series (2 titles, 4 runners-up) ===
Women's singles
Year	Tournament	Opponent	Score	Result	Ref.
2019	Estonian International	(Japan) Asuka Takahashi	21–8, 17–21, 11–21	(silver) Runner-up	
2019	Vietnam International	(South Korea) An Se-young	21–19, 21–11	(gold) Winner	
2019	Indonesia International	(Japan) Asuka Takahashi	16–21, 15–21	(silver) Runner-up	
2022	Belgian International	(Vietnam) Nguyễn Thùy Linh	19–21, 16–21	(silver) Runner-up	
2022	Polish International	(China) Qiu Ziying	18–21, 21–11, 21–14	(gold) Winner	
2022	North Harbour International	(Japan) Shiori Saito	19–21, 19–21	(silver) Runner-up	

BWF International Challenge tournament
BWF International Series tournament

=== BWF Junior International (1 title) ===
Girls' singles
Year	Tournament	Opponent	Score	Result	Ref.
2017	German Junior	(Singapore) Yeo Jia Min	22–20, 21–19	(gold) Winner	

BWF Junior International Grand Prix tournament
