= Wei Yaxin =

Chinese badminton player (born 2000)

Wei Yaxin 魏雅欣
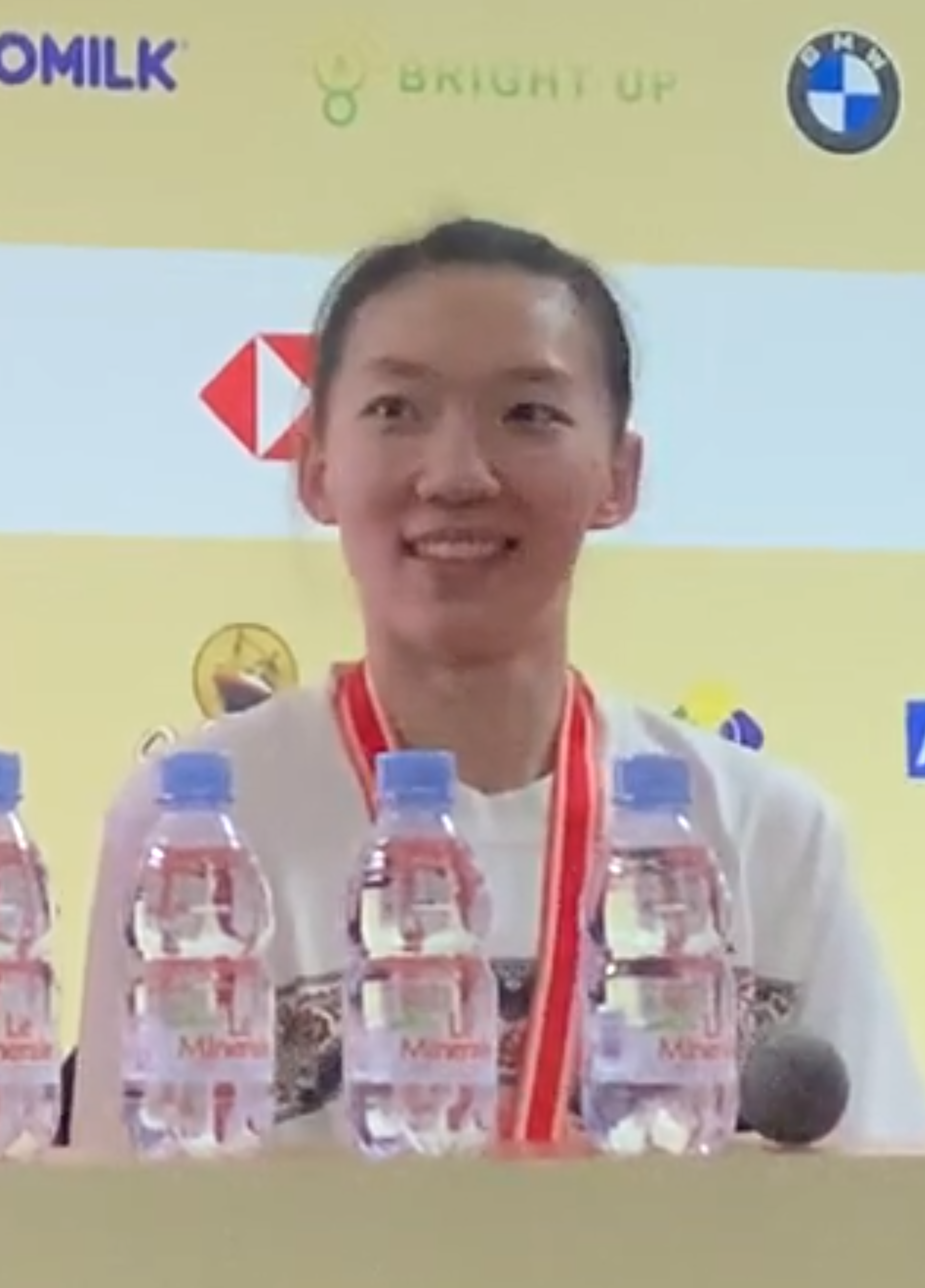
- Wei at the 2024 Indonesia Open

Personal information
- Born: 18 April 2000 (age 26) Changsha, Hunan, China
- Height: 1.75 m (5 ft 9 in)

Sport
- Country: China
- Sport: Badminton
- Handedness: Left

Mixed doubles
- Highest ranking: 1 (with Jiang Zhenbang, 18 March 2025)
- Current ranking: 2 (with Jiang Zhenbang, 6 October 2026)
- BWF profile
Medal record
Women's badminton
Representing China
World Championships
Silver medal – second place	2025 Paris	Mixed doubles
Bronze medal – third place	2023 Copenhagen	Mixed doubles
Bronze medal – third place	2026 New Delhi	Mixed doubles
Sudirman Cup
Gold medal – first place	2025 Xiamen	Mixed team
Asian Games
Gold medal – first place	2026 Aichi–Nagoya	Mixed doubles
Gold medal – first place	2026 Aichi–Nagoya	Women's team
Asian Championships
Gold medal – first place	2023 Dubai	Mixed doubles
Bronze medal – third place	2024 Ningbo	Mixed doubles
Bronze medal – third place	2025 Ningbo	Mixed doubles
Asia Mixed Team Championships
Gold medal – first place	2023 Dubai	Mixed team
World Junior Championships
Gold medal – first place	2018 Markham	Mixed team
Bronze medal – third place	2018 Markham	Girls' singles
Asian Junior Championships
Gold medal – first place	2018 Jakarta	Mixed team
Bronze medal – third place	2018 Jakarta	Girls' singles

Wei Yaxin (Chinese: 魏雅欣; pinyin: Wèi Yǎxīn; born 18 April 2000) is a Chinese badminton player. Partnering Jiang Zhenbang, she has won medals at the World Championships, Asian Games, and Asian Championships, and the pair attained the world No. 1 ranking for the first time on 18 March 2025. Wei was also part of the Chinese national team that claimed the Sudirman Cup in 2025.

== Background ==
Wei was born on 18 April 2000 in Changsha, Hunan, China. She started playing badminton at the age of seven when her father took her to a court for the first time. She quickly developed an interest and started formal training a year later at a sports school. Despite being one of the youngest players, she progressed quickly and reached the Hunan provincial team's standard within two years. However, at age nine, she was initially rejected for being too young. She first played for the Changsha badminton team and officially joined the Hunan provincial team in 2013.

== Career ==
=== 2017–2018: Junior career ===
In 2017, Wei competed in several international tournaments, including the Korea Junior International, where she was the U-19 girls' singles runner-up. She began the 2018 season as the finalist in the girls' singles event at the Dutch Junior Grand Prix. Apart from that, she won medals in various other international events as well, including bronze medals at the Asian and the World Junior Championships.

=== 2019 ===
Wei, after being promoted from the reserve list, became the champion at the Polish Open in March by defeating Germany's Yvonne Li in three games. However, she was unable to make deeper runs in the tournaments she entered later in the year.

=== 2022 ===
In October, she returned to international competition following the pandemic, now focusing on mixed doubles with Jiang Zhenbang. At their first tournament together, the Indonesia International in Malang, they finished as runners-up to Dejan Ferdinansyah and Gloria Emanuelle Widjaja. A week later, the pair captured their maiden title at the Indonesia Masters Super 100, defeating compatriots Cheng Xing and Chen Fanghui in straight games. They continued their momentum in November by winning the Vietnam International and wrapped up the season with a runner-up result at the Malaysia International.

=== 2023 ===
2023 was a breakthrough year for Wei and Jiang. They started the season by reaching the final of the Indonesia Masters as qualifiers, where they placed second to teammates Feng Yanzhe and Huang Dongping. Wei was also part of China's team that won the 2023 Asia Mixed Team Championships.

Following this, she and Jiang won the Ruichang China Masters and then earned their first BWF World Tour title at the Swiss Open, defeating Malaysians Goh Soon Huat and Shevon Jemie Lai 21–17, 19–21, 21–17 in the final. They also captured the 2023 Asian Championships crown after overcoming seniors Zheng Siwei and Huang Yaqiong in two straight games.

In the second half of the year, the pair were runners-up at the Korea Open and went on to take a bronze medal on their World Championships debut, where they fell to Zheng Siwei and Huang Yaqiong in the semi-finals. In September, Wei competed with Guo Xinwa as a scratch pair to win the Hong Kong Open.

She and Jiang then fell short in the final of Arctic Open before clinching their first Super 750 title at the French Open by beating veterans Tang Chun Man and Tse Ying Suet in three games. They also secured another runner-up finish at the Korea Masters. At the BWF Awards in December, Wei and Jiang were named Most Improved Player of the Year, in recognition of their rapid rise in the world rankings.

=== 2024 ===
Wei and Jiang began the year by reaching the semi-finals of the Malaysia Open, before placing second at the India Open to former world champions Dechapol Puavaranukroh and Sapsiree Taerattanachai. A few months later, they were stopped in the last four of the 2024 Asian Championships and settled for bronze.

The pair then produced a strong run of results, triumphing against Zheng Siwei and Huang Yaqiong 21–11, 21–14 to claim their first Super 1000 crown at the Indonesia Open, followed by another title at the Australian Open the next week. They also won the Japan Open in August and captured their fourth title in five tournaments played at the Hong Kong Open.

In the following months, they finished as runners-up in consecutive finals at the Arctic Open and Denmark Open, both to Feng Yanzhe and Huang Dongping. The duo also made their debut at the World Tour Finals, where they reached the semi-finals before falling to Olympic and eventual champions Zheng Siwei and Huang Yaqiong.

=== 2025 ===
At the India Open, Wei and Jiang claimed the title, improving on their runner-up finish from the previous season. She also began a short partnership with Feng Yanzhe at the All England Open, where they reached the final before losing to compatriots Guo Xinwa and Chen Fanghui. On 18 March, Wei and Jiang rose to world number 1 for the first time. That same week, she and Feng captured the Swiss Open title.

Returning to her regular partnership with Jiang, Wei secured a second consecutive bronze medal at the 2025 Asian Championships and earned her first Sudirman Cup medal after contributing to China's triumph at the 2025 Sudirman Cup. She and Jiang also placed second at the Malaysia Masters.

In July, the pair defended their Japan Open crown, defeating Dechapol Puavaranukroh and Supissara Paewsampran for their first title together since January, before finishing as runners-up at the China Open the following week. Seeded second at the 2025 World Championships, they advanced to the final but lost 15–21, 14–21 to Chen Tang Jie and Toh Ee Wei, settling for silver.

Later in the season, Wei and Jiang reached the Korea Open final before finishing second. They went on to win the Arctic Open in October, followed by another final appearance at the Denmark Open the following week. At the year-end World Tour Finals, they finished as runners-up to Feng Yanzhe and Huang Dongping, bringing their head-to-head record against Feng and Huang to 3–14.

=== 2026 ===
At the season opener in Malaysia, Wei and Jiang lost to familiar rivals Feng/Huang in the final. In March, their campaign at the All England Open ended in the quarter-finals. They subsequently withdrew from next month's 2026 Asian Championships. In May, Wei formed a temporary partnership with Gao Jiaxuan, competing in four tournaments and winning the Malaysia Masters.

She and Jiang reunited after three months at the Macau Open and captured the title on their first tournament back as a pair. The pair claimed their second Worlds bronze medal at the 2026 World Championships. Wei made her Asian Games debut in September, winning gold as a part of China's women's team. She and Jiang also competed in the mixed doubles event where they faced Amri Syahnawi and Nita Violina Marwah in the final. The duo came from behind in the opening game before winning 21–19, 21–8 to claim the gold medal.

Fresh off their Asian Games success, the pair reached their fourth consecutive Arctic Open final and successfully defended their title. The following week, they defeated three-time defending champions Feng/Huang in the final to win the Denmark Open.

== Achievements ==
=== World Championships ===
Mixed doubles
Year	Venue	Partner	Opponent	Score	Result
2023	Royal Arena, Copenhagen, Denmark	(China) Jiang Zhenbang	(China) Zheng Siwei (China) Huang Yaqiong	18–21, 16–21	Bronze
2025	Adidas Arena, Paris, France	(China) Jiang Zhenbang	(Malaysia) Chen Tang Jie (Malaysia) Toh Ee Wei	15–21, 14–21	Silver
2026	Indira Gandhi Arena, New Delhi, India	(China) Jiang Zhenbang	(France) Thom Gicquel (France) Delphine Delrue	21–19, 13–21, 11–21	Bronze

=== Asian Games ===
Mixed doubles
Year	Venue	Partner	Opponent	Score	Result
2026	Ichinomiya City Municipal Gymnasium, Ichinomiya, Japan	(China) Jiang Zhenbang	(Indonesia) Amri Syahnawi (Indonesia) Nita Violina Marwah	21–19, 21–8	Gold

=== Asian Championships ===
Mixed doubles
Year	Venue	Partner	Opponent	Score	Result
2023	Sheikh Rashid Bin Hamdan Indoor Hall, Dubai, United Arab Emirates	(China) Jiang Zhenbang	(China) Zheng Siwei (China) Huang Yaqiong	21–15, 21–16	Gold
2024	Ningbo Olympic Sports Center Gymnasium, Ningbo, China	(China) Jiang Zhenbang	(China) Feng Yanzhe (China) Huang Dongping	10–21, 14–21	Bronze
2025	Ningbo Olympic Sports Center Gymnasium, Ningbo, China	(China) Jiang Zhenbang	(Hong Kong) Tang Chun Man (Hong Kong) Tse Ying Suet	16–21, 17–21	Bronze

=== World Junior Championships ===
Girls' singles
Year	Venue	Opponent	Score	Result
2018	Markham Pan Am Centre, Markham, Canada	(Denmark) Line Christophersen	18–21, 21–23	Bronze

=== Asian Junior Championships ===
Girls' singles
Year	Venue	Opponent	Score	Result
2018	Jaya Raya Sports Hall Training Center, Jakarta, Indonesia	(China) Wang Zhiyi	14–21, 12–21	Bronze

=== BWF World Tour (19 titles, 15 runners-up) ===
The BWF World Tour, which was announced on 19 March 2017, and implemented in 2018, is a series of elite badminton tournaments sanctioned by the Badminton World Federation (BWF). The BWF World Tour is divided into levels of World Tour Finals, Super 1000, Super 750, Super 500, Super 300, and the BWF Tour Super 100.

Mixed doubles
Year	Tournament	Level	Partner	Opponent	Score	Result
2022	Indonesia Masters	Super 100	(China) Jiang Zhenbang	(China) Cheng Xing (China) Chen Fanghui	21–12, 21–15	(gold) Winner
2023	Indonesia Masters	Super 500	(China) Jiang Zhenbang	(China) Feng Yanzhe (China) Huang Dongping	15–21, 21–16, 19–21	(silver) Runner-up
2023	Ruichang China Masters	Super 100	(China) Jiang Zhenbang	(China) Cheng Xing (China) Chen Fanghui	21–15, 21–8	(gold) Winner
2023	Swiss Open	Super 300	(China) Jiang Zhenbang	(Malaysia) Goh Soon Huat (Malaysia) Shevon Jemie Lai	21–17, 19–21, 21–17	(gold) Winner
2023	Korea Open	Super 500	(China) Jiang Zhenbang	(China) Feng Yanzhe (China) Huang Dongping	16–21, 13–21	(silver) Runner-up
2023	Hong Kong Open	Super 500	(China) Guo Xinwa	(Hong Kong) Tang Chun Man (Hong Kong) Tse Ying Suet	21–13, 21–19	(gold) Winner
2023	Arctic Open	Super 500	(China) Jiang Zhenbang	(China) Feng Yanzhe (China) Huang Dongping	14–21, 15–21	(silver) Runner-up
2023	French Open	Super 750	(China) Jiang Zhenbang	(Hong Kong) Tang Chun Man (Hong Kong) Tse Ying Suet	21–17, 15–21, 21–12	(gold) Winner
2023	Korea Masters	Super 300	(China) Jiang Zhenbang	(South Korea) Seo Seung-jae (South Korea) Chae Yoo-jung	14–21, 15–21	(silver) Runner-up
2024	India Open	Super 750	(China) Jiang Zhenbang	(Thailand) Dechapol Puavaranukroh (Thailand) Sapsiree Taerattanachai	16–21, 16–21	(silver) Runner-up
2024	Indonesia Open	Super 1000	(China) Jiang Zhenbang	(China) Zheng Siwei (China) Huang Yaqiong	21–11, 21–14	(gold) Winner
2024	Australian Open	Super 500	(China) Jiang Zhenbang	(China) Guo Xinwa (China) Chen Fanghui	21–12, 16–21, 21–12	(gold) Winner
2024	Japan Open	Super 750	(China) Jiang Zhenbang	(Hong Kong) Tang Chun Man (Hong Kong) Tse Ying Suet	21–12, 21–12	(gold) Winner
2024	Hong Kong Open	Super 500	(China) Jiang Zhenbang	(China) Feng Yanzhe (China) Huang Dongping	21–17, 21–19	(gold) Winner
2024	Arctic Open	Super 500	(China) Jiang Zhenbang	(China) Feng Yanzhe (China) Huang Dongping	18–21, 21–6, 15–21	(silver) Runner-up
2024	Denmark Open	Super 750	(China) Jiang Zhenbang	(China) Feng Yanzhe (China) Huang Dongping	21–15, 18–21, 17–21	(silver) Runner-up
2025	India Open	Super 750	(China) Jiang Zhenbang	(France) Thom Gicquel (France) Delphine Delrue	21–18, 21–17	(gold) Winner
2025	All England Open	Super 1000	(China) Feng Yanzhe	(China) Guo Xinwa (China) Chen Fanghui	16–21, 21–10, 21–23	(silver) Runner-up
2025	Swiss Open	Super 300	(China) Feng Yanzhe	(China) Zhu Yijun (China) Zhang Chi	21–13, 21–15	(gold) Winner
2025	Malaysia Masters	Super 500	(China) Jiang Zhenbang	(China) Feng Yanzhe (China) Huang Dongping	17–21, 21–14, 16–21	(silver) Runner-up
2025	Japan Open	Super 750	(China) Jiang Zhenbang	(Thailand) Dechapol Puavaranukroh (Thailand) Supissara Paewsampran	21–19, 16–21, 21–15	(gold) Winner
2025	China Open	Super 1000	(China) Jiang Zhenbang	(China) Feng Yanzhe (China) Huang Dongping	21–23, 17–21	(silver) Runner-up
2025	Korea Open	Super 500	(China) Jiang Zhenbang	(China) Feng Yanzhe (China) Huang Dongping	23–25, 11–21	(silver) Runner-up
2025	Arctic Open	Super 500	(China) Jiang Zhenbang	(China) Feng Yanzhe (China) Huang Dongping	21–19, 24–22	(gold) Winner
2025	Denmark Open	Super 750	(China) Jiang Zhenbang	(China) Feng Yanzhe (China) Huang Dongping	13–21, 9–21	(silver) Runner-up
2025	BWF World Tour Finals	World Tour Finals	(China) Jiang Zhenbang	(China) Feng Yanzhe (China) Huang Dongping	12–21, 17–21	(silver) Runner-up
2026	Malaysia Open	Super 1000	(China) Jiang Zhenbang	(China) Feng Yanzhe (China) Huang Dongping	19–21, 19–21	(silver) Runner-up
2026	Malaysia Masters	Super 500	(China) Gao Jiaxuan	(Thailand) Pakkapon Teeraratsakul (Thailand) Sapsiree Taerattanachai	21–13, 15–21, 21–11	(gold) Winner
2026	Macau Open	Super 300	(China) Jiang Zhenbang	(Hong Kong) Chan Yin Chak (Hong Kong) Ng Tsz Yau	21–14, 21–14	(gold) Winner
2026	Arctic Open	Super 500	(China) Jiang Zhenbang	(China) Gao Jiaxuan (China) Wu Mengying	21–18, 21–16	(gold) Winner
2026	Denmark Open	Super 750	(China) Jiang Zhenbang	(China) Feng Yanzhe (China) Huang Dongping	21–18, 8–21, 21–16	(gold) Winner
2026	Korea Open	Super 500	(China) Jiang Zhenbang	(China) Gao Jiaxuan (China) Wu Mengying	21–16, 21–13	(gold) Winner
2026	Japan Masters	Super 500	(China) Jiang Zhenbang	(China) Gao Jiaxuan (China) Wu Mengying	15–21, 21–15, 21–14	(gold) Winner
2026	Hong Kong Open	Super 500	(China) Jiang Zhenbang	(China) Feng Yanzhe (China) Huang Dongping	21–17, 9–21, 15–21	(silver) Runner-up

=== BWF International Challenge/Series (2 titles, 2 runners-up) ===
Women's singles
Year	Tournament	Opponent	Score	Result
2019	Polish Open	(Germany) Yvonne Li	21–8, 19–21, 22–20	(gold) Winner

Mixed doubles
Year	Tournament	Partner	Opponent	Score	Result
2022 (II)	Indonesia International	(China) Jiang Zhenbang	(Indonesia) Dejan Ferdinansyah (Indonesia) Gloria Emanuelle Widjaja	18–21, 20–22	(silver) Runner-up
2022	Vietnam International Series	(China) Jiang Zhenbang	(China) Cheng Xing (China) Chen Fanghui	21–14, 21–11	(gold) Winner
2022	Malaysia International	(China) Jiang Zhenbang	(China) Cheng Xing (China) Chen Fanghui	24–26, 18–21	(silver) Runner-up

BWF International Challenge tournament
BWF International Series tournament
BWF Future Series tournament

=== BWF Junior International (2 runners-up) ===
Girls' singles
Year	Tournament	Opponent	Score	Result
2017	Korea Junior International	(China) Wang Zhiyi	12–21, 12–21	(silver) Runner-up
2018	Dutch Junior International	(China) Wang Zhiyi	15–21, 5–21	(silver) Runner-up

BWF Junior International Grand Prix tournament
BWF Junior International Challenge tournament
BWF Junior International Series tournament
BWF Junior Future Series tournament
