= Wang Zhiyi =

Chinese badminton player (born 2000)

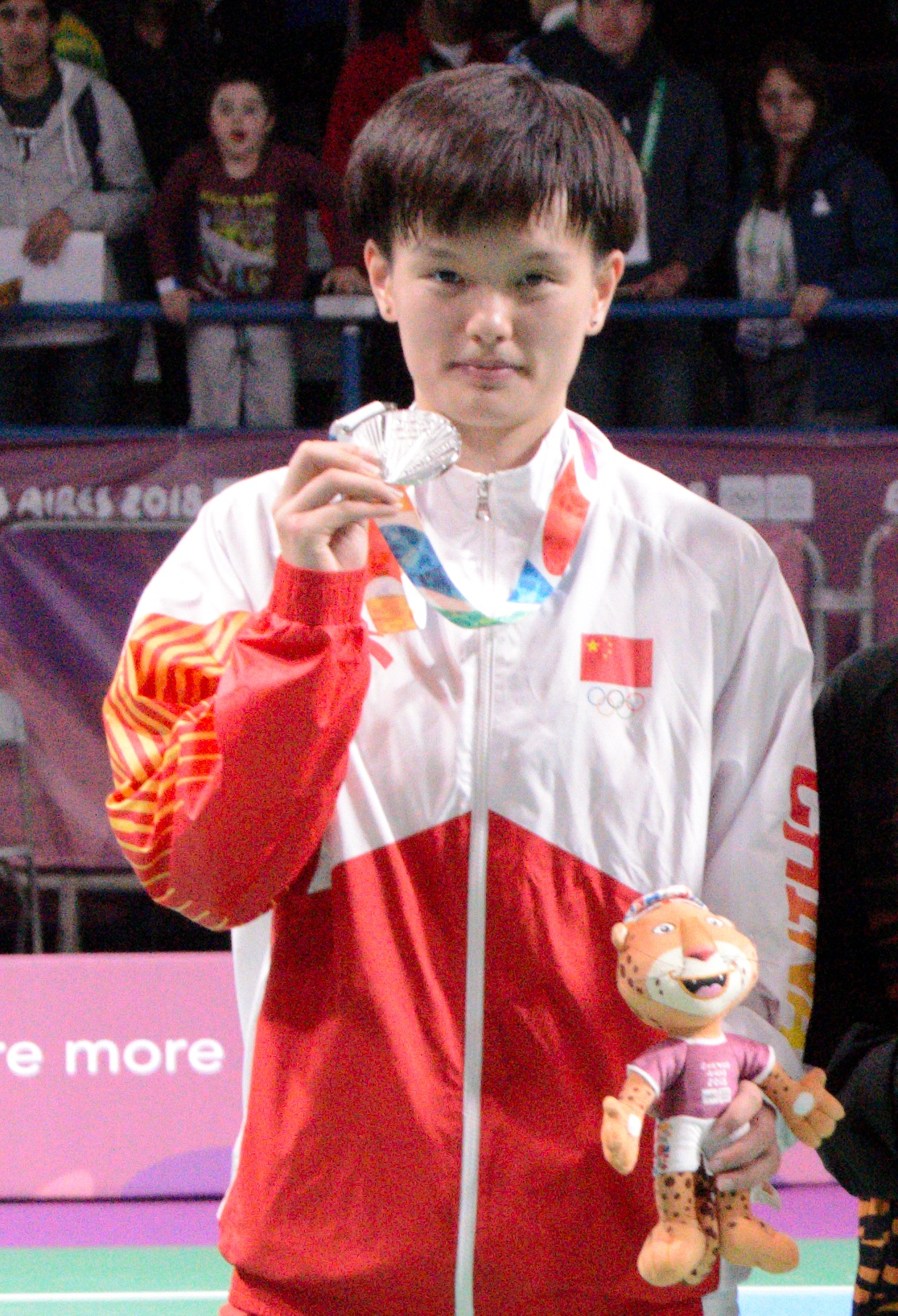

Wang Zhiyi (Chinese: 王祉怡; pinyin: Wáng Zhǐyí; born 29 April 2000) is a Chinese badminton player. She was two-time Asian Champions winning the title in 2022 and 2024. She was part of China winning team in the 2020 and 2024 Uber Cup, as well at the 2021 and 2023 Sudirman Cup. Capture her first BWF World Tour title in the 2019 U.S. Open, she later reached her highest ranking of world number 2 in the women's singles on 19 November 2024.

== Career ==
=== Early life and junior career ===
Wang started her career as a badminton player by training in Jingzhou sports school. She went to the Hubei provincial training centre in 2009, and was selected to join the team in 2013. In 2016, Wang joined the national team, and became part of the national second team in 2017.

=== 2018 ===
Wang has achieved a number of achievements in her career in the junior competitions. Wang emerged victory in the girls' singles at the 2018 Asian Junior Championships, and also helped the national team to clinch the mixed team title. She then represented her country at the 2018 Summer Youth Olympics in Buenos Aires, Argentina, and clinched the girls' singles silver, after losing the final match to Goh Jin Wei. She again had to accept defeat to Goh in the semi-finals of the World Junior Championships, making her have to be satisfied with a bronze medal.

=== 2019 ===
In the 2019 season, Wang get into her first BWF World Tour final in Canada Open, losing to An Se-young. She then won the U.S. Open as her first World Tour title whilst grabbing few more international tournaments such as Austrian Open, Belarus International, and second consecutive Malaysia International title. Wang also add two more World Tour win with Indonesia Masters and Dutch Open.

=== 2022–2023 ===
2022 was not a good season for Wang as she did not won a single world tour, only making into the final in Indonesia Open and Singapore Open. Despite that, she won the women's singles title at the 2022 Asian Championships, which is the biggest title of her career.

The 2023 season was worse than previous years as Wang did not win a single title in it. Only making as far as one final throughout the whole season in Arctic Open where she lost to Han Yue.

=== 2024 ===
Wang is set to shake up the women's singles competition in 2024, where she reached seven finals, and won six titles including her second Asia Championships title by defeating her senior compatriot Chen Yufei in the final. In the BWF World Tour, she won the Indonesia Masters, Malaysia Masters, Denmark Open, and clinched her first ever BWF World Tour Super 1000 in the home soil China Open. She then closed the season as a champion in the BWF World Tour Finals. Wang's defeat in the final was at the Korea Open, when she gave a walkover to Kim Ga-eun due to injury that she suffered. Wang also part of China winning team in the Uber Cup. She reached a career high of world number 2 in this season.

=== 2025 ===
Started the 2025 season as world number 2, Wang reached the finals in the Malaysia Open losing to An Se-young in straight game. In March, Wang managed to secure a spots in the final of All England Open but fall short again to An Se-young, this time in a grueling three sets. Despite losing all her matches in Sudirman Cup, China gained their 14th title in that competition.

Her short title drought since the season's finals in previous year ended after she managed to defend her Malaysia Masters title, this time against Han Yue. Wang advanced to the final again next week in Singapore Open but lost it against Chen Yufei. Wang again had a tough luck the next week where she lost the final of Indonesia Open against An in another 3 sets match when she faltered after losing the 17–10 lead in second sets before An finished it well in the third. In Japan Open, Wang lost to An for the fourth time in a year, outpowered in a straight sets in the process. In the next week, Wang capitalized her good form and defended her China Open title and won her first Super 1000 title of the year in a dominant win against Han Yue.

In 2025 BWF World Championships, Wang lost in the round of 16 to former 2019 champion, P. V. Sindhu. Two weeks later, Wang recovered and won the Hong Kong Open against Han Yue in their third final altogether in 2025. In October, Wang made the final again in Denmark Open but failed to defend her championship in the previous years. Wang lost again in French Open to An on the next week after. At the end of season, Wang failed to defend her World Tour Final title the previous year, losing out to An again in thrilling three sets. Wang concluded the season with an impressive 11 finals.

=== 2026 ===
After ending a spectacular 2025, Wang's losing streak against An Se-young continues as she was beaten at the season opener in the Malaysia Open final which was a repeat of last year's final. The next week in the India Open semi-final however, she secured her second victory over fellow compatriot, Chen Yufei to qualify for the final in the India Open for the first time. Her luck in the final did not change as she lost against An again for six consecutive titles since last year Denmark Open. She returned in March at the German Open where she marched towards the final but lost at the hands of her young compatriot, Han Qianxi in a tight two games match. The next week, Wang ended her nine final match losing streak against An Se-young at the All England Open in straight games, marking a significant win for her and the Chinese community. Onto the next month, Wang aimed for her third Asian Championships title but lost out again to An Se-young in the final, which would marked as the 20th times she lost to her in their career head-to-head matchups. She failed to reach the finals of the 2026 Indonesia, Japan. She also failed to defend her China Open crown for a third consecutive time, losing to Akane Yamaguchi in 3 thrilling sets and slipping to rank 3. In the World Championships, Wang avenged her previous-year loss to P. V. Sindhu, who was on home soil, in 3 games. She managed to reach the semis where she lost to An Se-young, but this was the furthest Wang had ever managed to reach in a World Championship. In September, Wang won the Asian Games gold medal in team event and struck bronze in the individual event as she fell to Yamaguchi in the semifinals. She continued her consistent form to reach the semifinals of the Denmark Open, where she once again lost out of Yamaguchi in 2 straight sets. Wang reached her first final since All England at the Japan Masters but defeated in two games against Yamaguchi who was the home favourite at the tournament. Onto the next week, she ended her title drought and won her second title of the year at the Hong Kong Open, beating the Thai's Pornpawee Chochuwong in the final.

== Achievements ==
=== World Championships ===
Women's singles
Year	Venue	Opponent	Score	Result	Ref.
2026	Indira Gandhi Arena, New Delhi, India	(South Korea) An Se-young	22–24, 16–21	Bronze	

=== Asian Games ===
Women's singles
Year	Venue	Opponent	Score	Result	Ref.
2026	Ichinomiya City Municipal Gymnasium, Ichinomiya, Japan	(Japan) Akane Yamaguchi	11–21, 20–22	Bronze	

=== Asian Championships ===
Women's singles
Year	Venue	Opponent	Score	Result	Ref.
2022	Muntinlupa Sports Complex, Metro Manila, Philippines	(Japan) Akane Yamaguchi	15–21, 21–13, 21–19	Gold	
2024	Ningbo Olympic Sports Center Gymnasium, Ningbo, China	(China) Chen Yufei	21–19, 21–7	Gold	
2026	Ningbo Olympic Sports Center Gymnasium, Ningbo, China	(South Korea) An Se-young	12–21, 21–17, 18–21	Silver	

=== Youth Olympic Games ===
Girls' singles
Year	Venue	Opponent	Score	Result	Ref.
2018	Tecnópolis, Buenos Aires, Argentina	(Malaysia) Goh Jin Wei	21–16, 13–21, 19–21	Silver	

=== World Junior Championships ===
Girls' singles
Year	Venue	Opponent	Score	Result	Ref.
2018	Markham Pan Am Centre, Markham, Canada	(Malaysia) Goh Jin Wei	9–21, 13–21	Bronze	

=== Asian Junior Championships ===
Girls' singles
Year	Venue	Opponent	Score	Result	Ref.
2018	Jaya Raya Sports Hall Training Center, Jakarta, Indonesia	(China) Zhou Meng	21–19, 21–8	Gold	

=== BWF World Tour (13 titles, 17 runners-up) ===
The BWF World Tour, which was announced on 19 March 2017 and implemented in 2018, is a series of elite badminton tournaments sanctioned by the Badminton World Federation (BWF). The BWF World Tour is divided into levels of World Tour Finals, Super 1000, Super 750, Super 500, Super 300 (part of the HSBC World Tour), and the BWF Tour Super 100.

Women's singles
Year	Tournament	Level	Opponent	Score	Result	Ref.
2019	Canada Open	Super 100	(South Korea) An Se-young	15–21, 20–22	(silver) Runner-up	
2019	U.S. Open	Super 300	(South Korea) Kim Ga-eun	21–18, 21–19	(gold) Winner	
2019	Indonesia Masters	Super 100	(Thailand) Porntip Buranaprasertsuk	20–22, 21–15, 21–13	(gold) Winner	
2019	Dutch Open	Super 100	(Russia) Evgeniya Kosetskaya	21–14, 21–18	(gold) Winner	
2022	Indonesia Open	Super 1000	(Chinese Taipei) Tai Tzu-ying	23–21, 6–21, 15–21	(silver) Runner-up	
2022	Singapore Open	Super 500	(India) P. V. Sindhu	9–21, 21–11, 15–21	(silver) Runner-up	
2023	Arctic Open	Super 500	(China) Han Yue	21–16, 20–22, 12–21	(silver) Runner-up	
2024	Indonesia Masters	Super 500	(Japan) Nozomi Okuhara	21–14, 21–13	(gold) Winner	
2024	Malaysia Masters	Super 500	(India) P. V. Sindhu	16–21, 21–5, 21–16	(gold) Winner	
2024	Korea Open	Super 500	(South Korea) Kim Ga-eun	Walkover	(silver) Runner-up	
2024	China Open	Super 1000	(Japan) Tomoka Miyazaki	21–17, 21–15	(gold) Winner	
2024	Denmark Open	Super 750	(South Korea) An Se-young	21–10, 21–12	(gold) Winner	
2024	BWF World Tour Finals	World Tour Finals	(China) Han Yue	19–21, 21–19, 21–11	(gold) Winner	
2025	Malaysia Open	Super 1000	(South Korea) An Se-young	17–21, 7–21	(silver) Runner-up	
2025	All England Open	Super 1000	(South Korea) An Se-young	21–13, 18–21, 18–21	(silver) Runner-up	
2025	Malaysia Masters	Super 500	(China) Han Yue	13–21, 21–13, 21–18	(gold) Winner	
2025	Singapore Open	Super 750	(China) Chen Yufei	11–21, 11–21	(silver) Runner-up	
2025	Indonesia Open	Super 1000	(South Korea) An Se-young	21–13, 19–21, 15–21	(silver) Runner-up	
2025	Japan Open	Super 750	(South Korea) An Se-young	12–21, 10–21	(silver) Runner-up	
2025	China Open	Super 1000	(China) Han Yue	21–8, 21–13	(gold) Winner	
2025	Hong Kong Open	Super 500	(China) Han Yue	21–14, 24–22	(gold) Winner	
2025	Denmark Open	Super 750	(South Korea) An Se-young	5–21, 22–24	(silver) Runner-up	
2025	French Open	Super 750	(South Korea) An Se-young	13–21, 7–21	(silver) Runner-up	
2025	BWF World Tour Finals	World Tour Finals	(South Korea) An Se-young	13–21, 21–18, 10–21	(silver) Runner-up	
2026	Malaysia Open	Super 1000	(South Korea) An Se-young	15–21, 22–24	(silver) Runner-up	
2026	India Open	Super 750	(South Korea) An Se-young	13–21, 11–21	(silver) Runner-up	
2026	German Open	Super 300	(China) Han Qianxi	19–21, 20–22	(silver) Runner-up	
2026	All England Open	Super 1000	(South Korea) An Se-young	21–15, 21–19	(gold) Winner	
2026	Japan Masters	Super 500	(Japan) Akane Yamaguchi	14–21, 20–22	(silver) Runner-up	
2026	Hong Kong Open	Super 500	(Thailand) Pornpawee Chochuwong	21–16, 21–11	(gold) Winner	

=== BWF International Challenge/Series (4 titles, 1 runner-up) ===
Women's singles
Year	Tournament	Opponent	Score	Result
2017	China International	(China) Cai Yanyan	9–11, 13–10, 11–9, 7–11	(silver) Runner-up
2018	Malaysia International	(Malaysia) Lee Ying Ying	21–10, 22–24, 21–14	(gold) Winner
2019	Austrian Open	(Thailand) Porntip Buranaprasertsuk	21–18, 21–10	(gold) Winner
2019	Belarus International	(China) Zhang Yiman	18–21, 21–9, 21–8	(gold) Winner
2019	Malaysia International	(Japan) Asuka Takahashi	12–21, 21–17, 21–16	(gold) Winner

BWF International Challenge tournament
BWF International Series tournament

=== BWF Junior International (4 titles) ===
Girls' singles
Year	Tournament	Opponent	Score	Result
2017	Korea Junior International	(China) Wei Yaxin	21–12, 21–12	(gold) Winner
2018	Dutch Junior International	(China) Wei Yaxin	21–15, 21–5	(gold) Winner
2018	Jaya Raya Junior International	(China) Zhou Meng	21–15, 21–16	(gold) Winner
2018	Banthongyord Junior International	(Thailand) Phittayaporn Chaiwan	21–19, 21–16	(gold) Winner

BWF Junior International Grand Prix tournament
BWF Junior International Challenge tournament
BWF Junior International Series tournament
BWF Junior Future Series tournament

== Record against selected opponents ==
Record against Year-end Finals finalists, World Championships semi-finalists, and Olympic quarter-finalists. Accurate as of 23 December 2025.

Players	Matches	Results		Difference
Players	Matches	Won	Lost	Difference
(China) Chen Yufei	11	2	10	–8
(China) Han Yue	17	14	3	+11
(China) He Bingjiao	8	5	3	+2
(China) Li Xuerui	1	0	1	–1
(China) Zhang Yiman	12	8	4	+4
(Chinese Taipei) Tai Tzu-ying	2	0	2	–2
(India) Saina Nehwal	2	2	0	+2
(India) P. V. Sindhu	6	3	3	0
(Indonesia) Gregoria Mariska Tunjung	7	4	3	+1

Players	Matches	Results		Difference
Players	Matches	Won	Lost	Difference
(Indonesia) Putri Kusuma Wardani	7	7	0	+7
(Japan) Aya Ohori	9	5	4	+1
(Japan) Nozomi Okuhara	4	4	0	+4
(Japan) Akane Yamaguchi	13	7	6	+1
(South Korea) An Se-young	23	5	18	−13
(South Korea) Sung Ji-hyun	2	2	0	+2
(Spain) Carolina Marín	3	1	2	–1
(Thailand) Porntip Buranaprasertsuk	2	2	0	+2
(Thailand) Ratchanok Intanon	11	5	6	–1
