= 2025 Hong Kong Open (badminton) =

2025 badminton tournament

Tournament details
- Dates: 9 – 14 September
- Edition: 35th
- Level: Super 500
- Total prize money: US$500,000
- Venue: Hong Kong Coliseum
- Location: Kowloon, Hong Kong

Champions
- Men's singles: (China) Li Shifeng
- Women's singles: (China) Wang Zhiyi
- Men's doubles: (China) Liang Weikeng (China) Wang Chang
- Women's doubles: (China) Jia Yifan (China) Zhang Shuxian
- Mixed doubles: (China) Feng Yanzhe (China) Huang Dongping

The 2025 Hong Kong Open, officially the Li-Ning Hong Kong Open 2025, was a badminton tournament which took place at the Hong Kong Coliseum in Hong Kong from 9 to 14 September 2025 and had a total prize of $500,000.

== Tournament ==
The 2025 Hong Kong Open was the twenty-first tournament of the 2025 BWF World Tour and also part of the Hong Kong Open championships, which had been held since 1982. This tournament was organized by Hong Kong Badminton Association and sanctioned by the BWF.

=== Venue ===
This tournament was held at the Hong Kong Coliseum in Hong Kong.

=== Point distribution ===
Below is a table with the point distribution for each phase of the tournament based on the BWF points system for the BWF World Tour Super 500 event.

Winner	Runner-up	3/4	5/8	9/16	17/32	33/64	65/128
9,200	7,800	6,420	5,040	3,600	2,220	880	430

=== Prize money ===
The total prize money for this tournament was US$500,000. Distribution of prize money was in accordance with BWF regulations.

Event	Winner	Finalist	Semi-finals	Quarter-finals	Last 16
Singles	$37,500	$19,000	$7,250	$3,000	$1,750
Doubles	$39,500	$19,000	$7,000	$3,625	$1,875

== Men's singles ==
=== Seeds ===
1. (Thailand) Kunlavut Vitidsarn (withdrew)
2. (China) Li Shifeng (champion)
3. (Chinese Taipei) Chou Tien-chen (semi-finals)
4. (Singapore) Loh Kean Yew (quarter-finals)
5. (Japan) Kodai Naraoka (second round)
6. (France) Christo Popov (semi-finals)
7. (China) Weng Hongyang (second round)
8. (France) Toma Junior Popov (first round)

=== Finals ===
Semi-finals
3	(Chinese Taipei) Chou Tien-chen	21	20
(India) Lakshya Sen	23	22
6	(France) Christo Popov	18	19
2	(China) Li Shifeng	21	21

Final
(India) Lakshya Sen	15	12
2	(China) Li Shifeng	21	21

=== Top half ===
==== Section 1 ====
First round
3	(Chinese Taipei) Chou T-c	21	21
(China) Wang ZX	11	15
Q3	(India) K George	21	21
(Singapore) J Teh	16	11
7	(China) Weng HY	21	21
(Japan) Y Tanaka	14	11
(Indonesia) A Farhan	21	22
Q1	(Hong Kong) J Gunawan	15	20

Second round
3	(Chinese Taipei) Chou T-c	21	21
Q3	(India) K George	6	12
7	(China) Weng HY	20	21	11
(Indonesia) A Farhan	22	12	21

Quarter-finals
3	(Chinese Taipei) Chou T-c	22	16	21
(Indonesia) A Farhan	20	21	14

==== Section 2 ====
First round
5	(Japan) K Naraoka	21	21
(Denmark) V Axelsen	15	7
PFQ	(Chinese Taipei) Su L-y	21	19	13
(India) A Shetty	15	21	21
SWM	(China) Lu GZ	17	14
(India) Prannoy HS	21	21
(Chinese Taipei) Wang T-w	20	21	15
(India) L Sen	22	16	21

Second round
5	(Japan) K Naraoka	19	21	14
(India) A Shetty	21	12	21
(India) Prannoy HS	21	18	10
(India) L Sen	15	21	21

Quarter-finals
(India) A Shetty	16	21	13
(India) L Sen	21	17	21

=== Bottom half ===
==== Section 3 ====
First round
Q4	(Malaysia) Aidil S	15	21	21
(Chinese Taipei) Chi Y-j	21	18	15
(Indonesia) A S Ginting	21	17	19
6	(France) C Popov	19	21	21
(Denmark) R Gemke	19	21	21
(Hong Kong) Lee C Y	21	14	18
(Canada) B Yang	16	14
4	(Singapore) Loh K Y	21	21

Second round
Q4	(Malaysia) Aidil S	17	19
6	(France) C Popov	21	21
(Denmark) R Gemke	16	18
4	(Singapore) Loh K Y	21	21

Quarter-finals
6	(France) C Popov	21	9	29
4	(Singapore) Loh K Y	18	21	27

==== Section 4 ====
First round
(Malaysia) Leong J H	21	21
(Malaysia) Lee Z J	16	16
Q2	(Malaysia) J Hoh	21	21
8	(France) T J Popov	12	17
(Hong Kong) Ng K L	21	19	18
(Japan) K Watanabe	14	21	21
(Chinese Taipei) Lee C-h	13	9
2	(China) Li SF	21	21

Second round
(Malaysia) Leong J H	21	15	21
Q2	(Malaysia) J Hoh	11	21	18
(Japan) K Watanabe	12	19
2	(China) Li SF	21	21

Quarter-finals
(Malaysia) Leong J H	20	21	20
2	(China) Li SF	22	14	22

== Women's singles ==
=== Seeds ===
1. (China) Wang Zhiyi (champion)
2. (China) Han Yue (final)
3. (Thailand) Pornpawee Chochuwong (second round)
4. (Japan) Tomoka Miyazaki (quarter-finals)
5. (Thailand) Ratchanok Intanon (quarter-finals)
6. (Thailand) Supanida Katethong (first round)
7. (China) Gao Fangjie (quarter-finals)
8. (India) P. V. Sindhu (first round)

=== Finals ===
Semi-finals
1	(China) Wang Zhiyi	21	22
(Canada) Michelle Li	16	20
(Chinese Taipei) Lin Hsiang-ti	21	19	19
2	(China) Han Yue	14	21	21

Final
1	(China) Wang Zhiyi	21	24
2	(China) Han Yue	14	22

=== Top half ===
==== Section 1 ====
First round
1	(China) Wang ZY	21	21
Q4	(Hong Kong) Lo S Y	18	13
(China) Han QX	20	18
(Japan) N Nidaira	22	21
7	(China) Gao FJ	22	21	21
(Denmark) M Blichfeldt	20	23	11
(Denmark) L Kjærsfeldt	21	21
(Thailand) B Ongbamrungphan	15	12

Second round
1	(China) Wang ZY	21	21
(Japan) N Nidaira	17	13
7	(China) Gao FJ	19	21	21
(Denmark) L Kjærsfeldt	21	15	11

Quarter-finals
1	(China) Wang ZY	18	21	21
7	(China) Gao FJ	21	15	11

==== Section 2 ====
First round
3	(Thailand) P Chochuwong	21	22	21
Q1	(Thailand) P Opatniputh	17	24	16
(Canada) M Li	21	21
(Japan) M Suizu	16	10
8	(India) P. V. Sindhu	21	16	19
(Denmark) L Christophersen	15	21	21
(Ukraine) P Buhrova	11	21	15
(United States) BW Zhang	21	11	21

Second round
3	(Thailand) P Chochuwong	12	21	21
(Canada) M Li	21	19	23
(Denmark) L Christophersen	13	18
(United States) BW Zhang	21	21

Quarter-finals
(Canada) M Li	16	22	21
(United States) BW Zhang	21	20	17

=== Bottom half ===
==== Section 3 ====
First round
(Chinese Taipei) Pai Y-p	15	16
(Denmark) J D Jakobsen	21	21
(Chinese Taipei) Lin H-t	8	21	21
6	(Thailand) S Katethong	21	11	19
(Japan) R Gunji	21	21
(Chinese Taipei) Hsu W-c	18	18
(India) A Upadhyaya	17	22	14
4	(Japan) T Miyazaki	21	20	21

Second round
(Denmark) J D Jakobsen	19	18
(Chinese Taipei) Lin H-t	21	21
(Japan) R Gunji	13	18
4	(Japan) T Miyazaki	21	21

Quarter-finals
(Chinese Taipei) Lin H-t	21	9	21
4	(Japan) T Miyazaki	13	21	14

==== Section 4 ====
First round
(Chinese Taipei) Chiu P-c	26	21
Q2	(Denmark) A Schulz	24	16
(India) R Ramraj	13	7
5	(Thailand) R Intanon	21	21
Q3	(Canada) W Y Zhang	24	21
(Malaysia) Letshanaa K	22	16
(Thailand) P Choeikeewong	18	12
2	(China) Han Y	21	21

Second round
(Chinese Taipei) Chiu P-c	15	16
5	(Thailand) R Intanon	21	21
Q3	(Canada) W Y Zhang	12	11
2	(China) Han Y	21	21

Quarter-finals
5	(Thailand) R Intanon	22	14
2	(China) Han Y	24	21

== Men's doubles ==
=== Seeds ===
1. (Malaysia) Aaron Chia / Soh Wooi Yik (first round)
2. (Malaysia) Goh Sze Fei / Nur Izzuddin (second round)
3. (Denmark) Kim Astrup / Anders Skaarup Rasmussen (first round)
4. (Indonesia) Fajar Alfian / Muhammad Rian Ardianto (withdrew)
5. (Malaysia) Man Wei Chong / Tee Kai Wun (second round)
6. (China) Liang Weikeng / Wang Chang (champions)
7. (Indonesia) Sabar Karyaman Gutama / Muhammad Reza Pahlevi Isfahani (quarter-finals)
8. (India) Satwiksairaj Rankireddy / Chirag Shetty (final)

=== Finals ===
Semi-finals
Q2	(Chinese Taipei) Chen Cheng-kuan (Chinese Taipei) Lin Bing-wei	17	15
8	(India) Satwiksairaj Rankireddy (India) Chirag Shetty	21	21
6	(China) Liang Weikeng (China) Wang Chang	21	21
(Chinese Taipei) Lee Fang-chih (Chinese Taipei) Lee Fang-jen	19	8

Final
8	(India) Satwiksairaj Rankireddy (India) Chirag Shetty	21	14	17
6	(China) Liang Weikeng (China) Wang Chang	19	21	21

=== Top half ===
==== Section 1 ====
First round
1	(Malaysia) A Chia (Malaysia) Soh W Y	13	13
(England) B Lane (England) S Vendy	21	21
Q2	(Chinese Taipei) Chen C-k (Chinese Taipei) Lin B-w	21	21
(France) C Popov (France) T J Popov	14	12
5	(Malaysia) Man W C (Malaysia) Tee K W	21	21
(Malaysia) N M Azriyn A (Malaysia) Tan W K	19	12
(Malaysia) Ong Y S (Malaysia) Teo E Y	24	20	17
(Chinese Taipei) Lee J-h (Chinese Taipei) Yang P-hs	22	22	21

Second round
(England) B Lane (England) S Vendy	18	22	29
Q2	(Chinese Taipei) Chen C-k (Chinese Taipei) Lin B-w	21	20	30
5	(Malaysia) Man W C (Malaysia) Tee K W	17	21	15
(Chinese Taipei) Lee J-h (Chinese Taipei) Yang P-hs	21	11	21

Quarter-finals
Q2	(Chinese Taipei) Chen C-k (Chinese Taipei) Lin B-w	15	21	21
(Chinese Taipei) Lee J-h (Chinese Taipei) Yang P-hs	21	18	18

==== Section 2 ====
First round
3	(Denmark) K Astrup (Denmark) A S Rasmussen	19	21
(Malaysia) J Arif (Malaysia) Yap R K	21	23
Q1	(Malaysia) Choong H J (Malaysia) M Haikal	21	16	21
(South Korea) Kim G-j (South Korea) Kim S-r	11	21	18
8	(India) S Rankireddy (India) C Shetty	21	18	21
(Chinese Taipei) Chiu H-c (Chinese Taipei) Wang C-l	13	21	10
PFQ	(Japan) K Mitsuhashi (Japan) H Okamura	14	15
Q4	(Thailand) P Sukphun (Thailand) P Teeraratsakul	21	21

Second round
(Malaysia) J Arif (Malaysia) Yap R K	21	21
Q1	(Malaysia) Choong H J (Malaysia) M Haikal	17	19
8	(India) S Rankireddy (India) C Shetty	18	21	21
Q4	(Thailand) P Sukphun (Thailand) P Teeraratsakul	21	15	11

Quarter-finals
(Malaysia) J Arif (Malaysia) Yap R K	14	22	16
8	(India) S Rankireddy (India) C Shetty	21	20	21

=== Bottom half ===
==== Section 3 ====
First round
Q3	(Malaysia) Low H Y (Malaysia) Ng E C	15	15
(China) Huang D (China) Liu Ya	21	21
(Japan) H Midorikawa (Japan) K Yamashita	17	12
SWM	(China) Chen BY (China) Liu Yi	21	21
(Chinese Taipei) Liu K-h (Chinese Taipei) Yang P-ha	21	19	20
(Indonesia) L R Carnando (Indonesia) B Maulana	13	21	22
(Thailand) K Kedren (Thailand) D Puavaranukroh	21	17
6	(China) Liang WK (China) Wang C	23	21

Second round
(China) Huang D (China) Liu Ya	21	22
SWM	(China) Chen BY (China) Liu Yi	19	20
(Indonesia) L R Carnando (Indonesia) B Maulana	12	20
6	(China) Liang WK (China) Wang C	21	22

Quarter-finals
(China) Huang D (China) Liu Ya	16	13
6	(China) Liang WK (China) Wang C	21	21

==== Section 4 ====
First round
(Japan) T Hoki (Japan) Y Kobayashi	20	21	21
(Denmark) D Lundgaard (Denmark) M Vestergaard	22	11	10
PFQ	(Denmark) W K Boe (Denmark) C F Kjær	10	18
7	(Indonesia) S K Gutama (Indonesia) M R P Isfahani	21	21
(Chinese Taipei) Lee F-c (Chinese Taipei) Lee F-j	21	21
(United States) Chen Z-y (United States) P Smith	16	15
(China) Xie HN (China) Zeng WH	12	21	19
2	(Malaysia) Goh S F (Malaysia) N Izzuddin	21	11	21

Second round
(Japan) T Hoki (Japan) Y Kobayashi	22	18	17
7	(Indonesia) S K Gutama (Indonesia) M R P Isfahani	20	21	21
(Chinese Taipei) Lee F-c (Chinese Taipei) Lee F-j	14	21	21
2	(Malaysia) Goh S F (Malaysia) N Izzuddin	21	16	13

Quarter-finals
7	(Indonesia) S K Gutama (Indonesia) M R P Isfahani	21	17
(Chinese Taipei) Lee F-c (Chinese Taipei) Lee F-j	23	21

== Women's doubles ==
=== Seeds ===
1. (China) Liu Shengshu / Tan Ning (second round)
2. (Malaysia) Pearly Tan / Thinaah Muralitharan (semi-finals)
3. (China) Jia Yifan / Zhang Shuxian (champions)
4. (Japan) Rin Iwanaga / Kie Nakanishi (final)
5. (China) Li Yijing / Luo Xumin (quarter-finals)
6. (Japan) Arisa Igarashi / Chiharu Shida (quarter-finals)
7. (Chinese Taipei) Hsieh Pei-shan / Hung En-tzu (quarter-finals)
8. (Hong Kong) Yeung Nga Ting / Yeung Pui Lam (first round)

=== Finals ===
Semi-finals
(Japan) Rui Hirokami (Japan) Sayaka Hobara	21	15	19
4	(Japan) Rin Iwanaga (Japan) Kie Nakanishi	17	21	21
3	(China) Jia Yifan (China) Zhang Shuxian	21	21
2	(Malaysia) Pearly Tan (Malaysia) Thinaah Muralitharan	14	11

Final
4	(Japan) Rin Iwanaga (Japan) Kie Nakanishi	17	15
3	(China) Jia Yifan (China) Zhang Shuxian	21	21

=== Top half ===
==== Section 1 ====
First round
1	(China) Liu SS (China) Tan N	21	21
(Canada) J Dent (Canada) C Lai	14	12
(Chinese Taipei) Hsu Y-h (Chinese Taipei) Lin J-y	21	16	19
(Japan) R Hirokami (Japan) S Hobara	18	21	21
5	(China) Li YJ (China) Luo XM	20	21	21
(Hong Kong) Lui L L (Hong Kong) Tsang H Y	22	7	14
Q2	(Hong Kong) Pang O K V (Hong Kong) Wong S Y	17	9
(India) R Panda (India) S Panda	21	21

Second round
1	(China) Liu SS (China) Tan N	21	19	16
(Japan) R Hirokami (Japan) S Hobara	12	21	21
5	(China) Li YJ (China) Luo XM	21	21
(India) R Panda (India) S Panda	13	7

Quarter-finals
(Japan) R Hirokami (Japan) S Hobara	21	17	22
5	(China) Li YJ (China) Luo XM	16	21	20

==== Section 2 ====
First round
4	(Japan) R Iwanaga (Japan) K Nakanishi	w	/	o
Q4	(Hong Kong) Chu W C (Hong Kong) Yu Y K
(Indonesia) L T Mayasari (Indonesia) A C Pratiwi	21	21
(Chinese Taipei) Teng C-h (Chinese Taipei) Yang C-y	17	19
6	(Japan) A Igarashi (Japan) C Shida	21	21
Q3	(Hong Kong) Au-Yeung W C (Hong Kong) Ip S Y	8	10
(Indonesia) R A Rose (Indonesia) F Setianingrum	12	21	16
(Indonesia) A Rahayu (Indonesia) S F S Ramadhanti	21	12	21

Second round
4	(Japan) R Iwanaga (Japan) K Nakanishi	21	21
(Indonesia) L T Mayasari (Indonesia) A C Pratiwi	12	14
6	(Japan) A Igarashi (Japan) C Shida	21	21
(Indonesia) A Rahayu (Indonesia) S F S Ramadhanti	16	19

Quarter-finals
4	(Japan) R Iwanaga (Japan) K Nakanishi	19	21	21
6	(Japan) A Igarashi (Japan) C Shida	21	12	19

=== Bottom half ===
==== Section 3 ====
First round
(Ukraine) P Buhrova (Ukraine) Y Kantemyr	15	21	21
Q1	(Hong Kong) Hung H Y (Hong Kong) Wong Y L Y	21	16	19
(Chinese Taipei) Hu L-f (Chinese Taipei) Jheng Y-c	18	21	13
7	(Chinese Taipei) Hsieh P-s (Chinese Taipei) Hung E-t	21	18	21
(Canada) C Choi (Canada) W Y Zhang	8	15
(United States) F Corbett (United States) J Gai	21	21
(Hong Kong) Cheung Y Y (Hong Kong) Leung S L	12	7
3	(China) Jia YF (China) Zhang SX	21	21

Second round
(Ukraine) P Buhrova (Ukraine) Y Kantemyr	16	16
7	(Chinese Taipei) Hsieh P-s (Chinese Taipei) Hung E-t	21	21
(United States) F Corbett (United States) J Gai	12	21	12
3	(China) Jia YF (China) Zhang SX	21	17	21

Quarter-finals
7	(Chinese Taipei) Hsieh P-s (Chinese Taipei) Hung E-t	12	7
3	(China) Jia YF (China) Zhang SX	21	21

==== Section 4 ====
First round
(Malaysia) Go P K (Malaysia) Teoh M X	21	17	21
(Hong Kong) Fan K Y (Hong Kong) Yau M Y	15	21	12
(Chinese Taipei) Hsu Y-c (Chinese Taipei) Sung Y-h	21	19	21
8	(Hong Kong) Yeung N T (Hong Kong) Yeung P L	13	21	18
(China) Chen QC (China) Keng SL	15	23	16
(Indonesia) F D Kusuma (Indonesia) M T Puspita Sari	21	21	21
PFQ	(Hong Kong) Chu W C (Hong Kong) Yu Y K	9	9
2	(Malaysia) P Tan (Malaysia) Thinaah M	21	21

Second round
(Malaysia) Go P K (Malaysia) Teoh M X	21	21
(Chinese Taipei) Hsu Y-c (Chinese Taipei) Sung Y-h	19	18
(Indonesia) F D Kusuma (Indonesia) M T Puspita Sari	18	17
2	(Malaysia) P Tan (Malaysia) Thinaah M	21	21

Quarter-finals
(Malaysia) Go P K (Malaysia) Teoh M X	12	15
2	(Malaysia) P Tan (Malaysia) Thinaah M	21	21

== Mixed doubles ==
=== Seeds ===
1. (China) Jiang Zhenbang / Wei Yaxin (quarter-finals)
2. (China) Feng Yanzhe / Huang Dongping (champions)
3. (Malaysia) Chen Tang Jie / Toh Ee Wei (withdrew)
4. (Thailand) Dechapol Puavaranukroh / Supissara Paewsampran (second round)
5. (Hong Kong) Tang Chun Man / Tse Ying Suet (quarter-finals)
6. (China) Guo Xinwa / Chen Fanghui (final)
7. (Malaysia) Goh Soon Huat / Shevon Jemie Lai (second round)
8. (Denmark) Jesper Toft / Amalie Magelund (quarter-finals)

=== Finals ===
Semi-finals
6	(China) Guo Xinwa (China) Chen Fanghui	21	21
(Indonesia) Adnan Maulana (Indonesia) Indah Cahya Sari Jamil	18	12
Q2	(Japan) Yuta Watanabe (Japan) Misaki Matsutomo	14	13
2	(China) Feng Yanzhe (China) Huang Dongping	21	21

Final
6	(China) Guo Xinwa (China) Chen Fanghui	14	14
2	(China) Feng Yanzhe (China) Huang Dongping	21	21

=== Top half ===
==== Section 1 ====
First round
1	(China) Jiang ZB (China) Wei YX	21	21
(Chinese Taipei) Lu M-c (Chinese Taipei) Hung E-t	16	13
Q1	(Hong Kong) Cheung S S (Hong Kong) Chu W C	9	11
(China) Gao JX (China) Wu MY	21	21
6	(China) Guo XW (China) Chen FH	21	21
(Chinese Taipei) Yang P-hs (Chinese Taipei) Hu L-f	12	15
(Chinese Taipei) Chen C-k (Chinese Taipei) Hsu Y-h	21	21
(India) D Kapila (India) T Crasto	16	11

Second round
1	(China) Jiang ZB (China) Wei YX	21	21
(China) Gao JX (China) Wu MY	15	13
6	(China) Guo XW (China) Chen FH	21	21
(Chinese Taipei) Chen C-k (Chinese Taipei) Hsu Y-h	8	18

Quarter-finals
1	(China) Jiang ZB (China) Wei YX	18	21	19
6	(China) Guo XW (China) Chen FH	21	8	21

==== Section 2 ====
First round
4	(Thailand) D Puavaranukroh (Thailand) S Paewsampran	21	21
(Thailand) P Teeraratsakul (Thailand) S Taerattanachai	11	15
(United States) P Smith (United States) J Gai	12	14
(Indonesia) A Maulana (Indonesia) I C S Jamil	21	21
5	(Hong Kong) Tang C M (Hong Kong) Tse Y S	13	21	21
(Malaysia) Wong T C (Malaysia) Lim C S	21	10	9
(Denmark) M Vestergaard (Denmark) C Busch	21	17	23
(United States) Chen Z-y (United States) F Corbett	14	21	21

Second round
4	(Thailand) D Puavaranukroh (Thailand) S Paewsampran	17	21	13
(Indonesia) A Maulana (Indonesia) I C S Jamil	21	18	21
5	(Hong Kong) Tang C M (Hong Kong) Tse Y S	21	21
(Denmark) M Vestergaard (Denmark) C Busch	16	19

Quarter-finals
(Indonesia) A Maulana (Indonesia) I C S Jamil	13	21	21
5	(Hong Kong) Tang C M (Hong Kong) Tse Y S	21	19	18

=== Bottom half ===
==== Section 3 ====
First round
(Chinese Taipei) Liu K-h (Chinese Taipei) Jheng Y-c	22	16	12
Q2	(Japan) Y Watanabe (Japan) M Matsutomo	20	21	21
(Chinese Taipei) Ye H-w (Chinese Taipei) N G Chan	25	21
SWM	(China) Cheng X (China) Zhang C	23	16
PFQ	(Canada) J Lai (Canada) C Lai	19	19
Q3	(Hong Kong) Hung K C (Hong Kong) Tsang H Y	21	21
(England) C Hemming (England) E van Leeuwen	13	6
8	(Denmark) J Toft (Denmark) A Magelund	21	21

Second round
Q2	(Japan) Y Watanabe (Japan) M Matsutomo	22	21
(Chinese Taipei) Ye H-w (Chinese Taipei) N G Chan	20	16
Q3	(Hong Kong) Hung K C (Hong Kong) Tsang H Y	9	11
8	(Denmark) J Toft (Denmark) A Magelund	21	21

Quarter-finals
Q2	(Japan) Y Watanabe (Japan) M Matsutomo	21	21
8	(Denmark) J Toft (Denmark) A Magelund	17	14

==== Section 4 ====
First round
(Ukraine) O Titov (Ukraine) Y Kantemyr	14	14
(Malaysia) Hoo P R (Malaysia) Cheng S Y	21	21
Q4	(Chinese Taipei) Lin B-w (Chinese Taipei) Lin J-y	21	21	8
7	(Malaysia) Goh S H (Malaysia) S J Lai	13	23	21
(Indonesia) J Hidayatullah (Indonesia) F Pasaribu	21	14	21
(Indonesia) A Syahnawi (Indonesia) N V Marwah	19	21	12
(India) R Kapoor (India) R Gadde	14	17
2	(China) Feng YZ (China) Huang DP	21	21

Second round
(Malaysia) Hoo P R (Malaysia) Cheng S Y	21	14	21
7	(Malaysia) Goh S H (Malaysia) S J Lai	10	21	16
(Indonesia) J Hidayatullah (Indonesia) F Pasaribu	17	17
2	(China) Feng YZ (China) Huang DP	21	21

Quarter-finals
(Malaysia) Hoo P R (Malaysia) Cheng S Y	16	10
2	(China) Feng YZ (China) Huang DP	21	21

Preceded by 2025 Baoji China Masters	BWF World Tour; 2025 BWF season	Succeeded by 2025 China Masters; 2025 Indonesia Masters Super 100 I
