= 2024 Thailand Open (badminton) =

2024 badminton tournament in Thailand

Tournament details
- Dates: 14–19 May
- Edition: 36th
- Level: Super 500
- Total prize money: US$420,000
- Venue: Nimibutr Stadium
- Location: Bangkok, Thailand

Champions
- Men's singles: (Malaysia) Lee Zii Jia
- Women's singles: (Thailand) Supanida Katethong
- Men's doubles: (India) Satwiksairaj Rankireddy (India) Chirag Shetty
- Women's doubles: (Thailand) Jongkolphan Kititharakul (Thailand) Rawinda Prajongjai
- Mixed doubles: (China) Guo Xinwa (China) Chen Fanghui

The 2024 Thailand Open (officially known as the Toyota Thailand Open 2024 for sponsorship reasons) was a badminton tournament held in Nimibutr Stadium in Bangkok, Thailand, from 14 to 19 May 2024. The tournament had a total prize pool of $420,000.

== Tournament ==
The 2024 Thailand Open was the twelfth tournament of the 2024 BWF World Tour and was part of the Thailand Open championships, which had been held since 1984. This tournament was organized by the Badminton Association of Thailand and is sanctioned by the BWF.

=== Venue ===
This international tournament was held at the Nimibutr Stadium in Bangkok, Thailand.

=== Point distribution ===
Below is the point distribution table for each phase of the tournament based on the BWF points system for the BWF World Tour Super 500 event.

Winner	Runner-up	3/4	5/8	9/16	17/32	33/64	65/128
9,200	7,800	6,420	5,040	3,600	2,220	880	430

=== Prize pool ===
The total prize money was US$420,000 with the distribution of the prize money in accordance with BWF regulations.

Event	Winner	Finalist	Semi-finals	Quarter-finals	Last 16
Singles	$31,500	$15,960	$6,090	$2,520	$1,470
Doubles	$33,180	$15,960	$5,880	$3,045	$1,575

== Men's singles ==
=== Seeds ===
1. (Denmark) Anders Antonsen (first round)
2. (Japan) Kodai Naraoka (quarter-finals)
3. (China) Li Shifeng (withdrew)
4. (Thailand) Kunlavut Vitidsarn (semi-finals)
5. (India) Prannoy H. S. (first round)
6. (Malaysia) Lee Zii Jia (champion)
7. (Singapore) Loh Kean Yew (first round)
8. (Chinese Taipei) Chou Tien-chen (semi-finals)

=== Finals ===
Semi-finals
(Hong Kong) Ng Ka Long	21	18	21
4	(Thailand) Kunlavut Vitidsarn	14	21	19
6	(Malaysia) Lee Zii Jia	18	21	21
8	(Chinese Taipei) Chou Tien-chen	21	12	13

Final
(Hong Kong) Ng Ka Long	11	10
6	(Malaysia) Lee Zii Jia	21	21

=== Top half ===
==== Section 1 ====
First round
1	(Denmark) A Antonsen	18	21	15
(Hong Kong) Ng K L	21	14	21
Q4	(Thailand) P Teeraratsakul	18	16
(China) Zhao JP	21	21
7	(Singapore) Loh K Y	15	13
(Chinese Taipei) Wang T-w	21	21
(Chinese Taipei) Lee C-h	21	21
PFQ	(Israel) M Zilberman	17	10

Second round
(Hong Kong) Ng K L	21	21
(China) Zhao JP	19	15
(Chinese Taipei) Wang T-w	21	17	18
(Chinese Taipei) Lee C-h	18	21	21

Quarter-finals
(Hong Kong) Ng K L	21	21
(Chinese Taipei) Lee C-h	13	14

==== Section 2 ====
First round
4	(Thailand) K Vitidsarn	21	21
(Denmark) R Gemke	18	12
(Chinese Taipei) Su L-y	21	15	17
(Malaysia) Leong J H	14	21	21
5	(India) Prannoy H. S.	19	18
Q1	(India) M L Maisnam	21	21
PFQ	(Denmark) M Christophersen	21	13	21
(India) K George	15	21	17

Second round
4	(Thailand) K Vitidsarn	20	21	23
(Malaysia) Leong J H	22	14	21
Q1	(India) M L Maisnam	21	22
PFQ	(Denmark) M Christophersen	14	20

Quarter-finals
4	(Thailand) K Vitidsarn	21	21
Q1	(India) M L Maisnam	12	5

=== Bottom half ===
==== Section 3 ====
First round
(Japan) K Watanabe	17	21	21
Q2	(Hong Kong) Chan Y C	21	17	14
(Thailand) K Wangcharoen	13	19
(China) Lu GZ	21	21
(Denmark) M Johannesen	9	16
(South Korea) Jeon H-j	21	21
(China) Lei LX	17	21
6	(Malaysia) Lee Z J	21	23

Second round
(Japan) K Watanabe	11	21	19
(China) Lu GZ	21	18	21
(South Korea) Jeon H-j	20	7
6	(Malaysia) Lee Z J	22	21

Quarter-finals
(China) Lu GZ	13	21	18
6	(Malaysia) Lee Z J	21	16	21

==== Section 4 ====
First round
(Belgium) J Carraggi	12	19
(Chinese Taipei) Chi Y-j	21	21
(Japan) T Obayashi	20	17
8	(Chinese Taipei) Chou T-c	22	21
Q3	(Hong Kong) J Gunawan	21	21
(India) S K Karunakaran	13	17
PFQ	(Japan) K Takahashi	12	5
2	(Japan) K Naraoka	21	21

Second round
(Chinese Taipei) Chi Y-j	13	16
8	(Chinese Taipei) Chou T-c	21	21
Q3	(Hong Kong) J Gunawan	21	15	20
2	(Japan) K Naraoka	11	21	22

Quarter-finals
8	(Chinese Taipei) Chou T-c	21	21
2	(Japan) K Naraoka	14	15

== Women's singles ==
=== Seeds ===
1. (China) Han Yue (final)
2. (China) Wang Zhiyi (semi-finals)
3. (Indonesia) Gregoria Mariska Tunjung (quarter-finals)
4. (Thailand) Ratchanok Intanon (second round)
5. (China) Zhang Yiman (first round)
6. (Thailand) Supanida Katethong (champion)
7. (Singapore) Yeo Jia Min (quarter-finals)
8. (Thailand) Pornpawee Chochuwong (semi-finals)

=== Finals ===
Semi-finals
1	(China) Han Yue	21	21
8	(Thailand) Pornpawee Chochuwong	13	18
6	(Thailand) Supanida Katethong	21	12	22
2	(China) Wang Zhiyi	17	21	20

Final
1	(China) Han Yue	16	23
6	(Thailand) Supanida Katethong	21	25

=== Top half ===
==== Section 1 ====
First round
1	(China) Han Y	21	21
(India) M Bansod	11	10
(India) A Chaliha	19	21	21
(Indonesia) E N T Wardoyo	21	15	14
5	(China) Zhang YM	15	12
(South Korea) Sim Y-j	21	21
Q1	(Hong Kong) S S Mehta	17	21	11
(Indonesia) K A C Dewi	21	13	21

Second round
1	(China) Han Y	21	12	21
(India) A Chaliha	15	21	12
(South Korea) Sim Y-j	21	19	14
(Indonesia) K A C Dewi	19	21	21

Quarter-finals
1	(China) Han Y	21	21
(Indonesia) K A C Dewi	14	9

==== Section 2 ====
First round
4	(Thailand) R Intanon	21	21
(Azerbaijan) K F Azzahra	11	7
(China) Gao FJ	21	21
(India) Samiya I F	13	13
8	(Thailand) P Chochuwong	21	14	21
(Chinese Taipei) Lin H-t	9	21	17
Q3	(South Korea) Kim J-e	18	21	21
(Thailand) P Choeikeewong	21	17	9

Second round
4	(Thailand) R Intanon	18	21	14
(China) Gao FJ	21	19	21
8	(Thailand) P Chochuwong	21	21
Q3	(South Korea) Kim J-e	16	12

Quarter-finals
(China) Gao FJ	21	16	12
8	(Thailand) P Chochuwong	10	21	21

=== Bottom half ===
==== Section 3 ====
First round
Q4	(Thailand) P Opatniputh	21	14	21
Q2	(Japan) K Sugiyama	10	21	19
(Malaysia) Letshanaa K	12	10
6	(Thailand) S Katethong	21	21
(Thailand) B Ongbamrungphan	21	21
(India) A Kashyap	13	8
(Chinese Taipei) Liang T-y	18	17
3	(Indonesia) G M Tunjung	21	21

Second round
Q4	(Thailand) P Opatniputh	13	16
6	(Thailand) S Katethong	21	21
(Thailand) B Ongbamrungphan	15	6^{r}
3	(Indonesia) G M Tunjung	21	14

Quarter-finals
6	(Thailand) S Katethong	14	22	22
3	(Indonesia) G M Tunjung	21	20	20

==== Section 4 ====
First round
(Indonesia) P K Wardani	21	10	21
(Chinese Taipei) Chiu P-c	18	21	23
PFQ	(South Korea) Kim G-r	13	16
7	(Singapore) Yeo J M	21	21
(Belgium) L Tan	14	21	21
(India) U Hooda	21	14	9
(Chinese Taipei) Huang Y-h	8	12
2	(China) Wang ZY	21	21

Second round
(Chinese Taipei) Chiu P-c	14	14
7	(Singapore) Yeo J M	21	21
(Belgium) L Tan	12	9
2	(China) Wang ZY	21	21

Quarter-finals
7	(Singapore) Yeo J M	14^{r}
2	(China) Wang ZY	19

== Men's doubles ==
=== Seeds ===
1. (India) Satwiksairaj Rankireddy / Chirag Shetty (champions)
2. (Indonesia) Muhammad Shohibul Fikri / Bagas Maulana (second round)
3. (China) He Jiting / Ren Xiangyu (withdrew)
4. (Indonesia) Leo Rolly Carnando / Daniel Marthin (first round)
5. (Indonesia) Mohammad Ahsan / Hendra Setiawan (second round)
6. (Chinese Taipei) Lu Ching-yao / Yang Po-han (first round)
7. (Thailand) Supak Jomkoh / Kittinupong Kedren (withdrew)
8. (Indonesia) Sabar Karyaman Gutama / Muhammad Reza Pahlevi Isfahani (first round)

=== Finals ===
Semi-finals
1	(India) Satwiksairaj Rankireddy (India) Chirag Shetty	21	21
(Chinese Taipei) Lu Ming-che (Chinese Taipei) Tang Kai-wei	11	12
(China) Chen Boyang (China) Liu Yi	21	21
(South Korea) Kim Gi-jung (South Korea) Kim Sa-rang	19	18

Final
1	(India) Satwiksairaj Rankireddy (India) Chirag Shetty	21	21
(China) Chen Boyang (China) Liu Yi	15	15

=== Top half ===
==== Section 1 ====
First round
1	(India) S Rankireddy (India) C Shetty	21	21
(Malaysia) N M Azriyn A (Malaysia) Tan W K	13	13
(China) Xie HN (China) Zeng WH	21	21
PFQ	(Thailand) T Punpanich (Thailand) W Sothon	11	17
6	(Chinese Taipei) Lu C-y (Chinese Taipei) Yang P-ha	21	13	16
(Malaysia) J Arif (Malaysia) Yap R K	16	21	21
Q2	(Malaysia) Beh C M (Malaysia) Goh B Z	20	12
(Denmark) D Lundgaard (Denmark) M Vestergaard	22	21

Second round
1	(India) S Rankireddy (India) C Shetty	21	21
(China) Xie HN (China) Zeng WH	16	11
(Malaysia) J Arif (Malaysia) Yap R K	21	21
(Denmark) D Lundgaard (Denmark) M Vestergaard	14	13

Quarter-finals
1	(India) S Rankireddy (India) C Shetty	21	21
(Malaysia) J Arif (Malaysia) Yap R K	7	14

==== Section 2 ====
First round
8	(Indonesia) S K Gutama (Indonesia) M R P Isfahani	15	21	19
(Chinese Taipei) Lu M-c (Chinese Taipei) Tang K-w	21	7	21
(South Korea) Kim Y-h (South Korea) Wang C	21	21
Q1	(Thailand) C Charoenkitamorn (Thailand) T Madee	18	15
(Malaysia) Choong H J (Malaysia) M Haikal	21	21
(Scotland) C Grimley (Scotland) M Grimley	16	11
(Thailand) P Kaosamaang (Thailand) W Thongsa-nga	21	21
Q3	(Malaysia) Chia W J (Malaysia) Liew X	19	12

Second round
(Chinese Taipei) Lu M-c (Chinese Taipei) Tang K-w	23	18	21
(South Korea) Kim Y-h (South Korea) Wang C	21	21	14
(Malaysia) Choong H J (Malaysia) M Haikal	21	21
(Thailand) P Kaosamaang (Thailand) W Thongsa-nga	17	10

Quarter-finals
(Chinese Taipei) Lu M-c (Chinese Taipei) Tang K-w	21	15	21
(Malaysia) Choong H J (Malaysia) M Haikal	18	21	18

=== Bottom half ===
==== Section 3 ====
First round
(Chinese Taipei) Lin B-w (Chinese Taipei) Su C-h	21	21
(Germany) B Geiss (Germany) J C Völker	19	18
Q4	(Thailand) P Thongkham (Thailand) W Thongkham	9	15
(China) Chen BY (China) Liu Y	21	21
(Thailand) P Sukphun (Thailand) P Teeraratsakul	21	21
(Hong Kong) Law C H (Hong Kong) Yeung S C	10	18
(South Korea) Jin Y (South Korea) Na S-s	20	21	21
4	(Indonesia) L R Carnando (Indonesia) D Marthin	22	13	17

Second round
(Chinese Taipei) Lin B-w (Chinese Taipei) Su C-h	19	10
(China) Chen BY (China) Liu Y	21	21
(Thailand) P Sukphun (Thailand) P Teeraratsakul	17	13
(South Korea) Jin Y (South Korea) Na S-s	21	21

Quarter-finals
(China) Chen BY (China) Liu Y	22	15	21
(South Korea) Jin Y (South Korea) Na S-s	20	21	14

==== Section 4 ====
First round
(Chinese Taipei) Chiang C-w (Chinese Taipei) Wu H-y	21	21
(Malaysia) Low H Y (Malaysia) Ng E C	19	18
(Chinese Taipei) Wei C-w (Chinese Taipei) Wu G-x	17	15
5	(Indonesia) M Ahsan (Indonesia) H Setiawan	21	21
PFQ	(Thailand) S Sothon (Thailand) N Trinkajee	16	9
(South Korea) Kim G-j (South Korea) Kim S-r	21	21
(Malaysia) Boon X Y (Malaysia) Goh V S	16	15
2	(Indonesia) M S Fikri (Indonesia) B Maulana	21	21

Second round
(Chinese Taipei) Chiang C-w (Chinese Taipei) Wu H-y	21	21
5	(Indonesia) M Ahsan (Indonesia) H Setiawan	15	16
(South Korea) Kim G-j (South Korea) Kim S-r	22	21
2	(Indonesia) M S Fikri (Indonesia) B Maulana	20	13

Quarter-finals
(Chinese Taipei) Chiang C-w (Chinese Taipei) Wu H-y	18	17
(South Korea) Kim G-j (South Korea) Kim S-r	21	21

== Women's doubles ==
=== Seeds ===
1. (Thailand) Jongkolphan Kititharakul / Rawinda Prajongjai (champions)
2. (Japan) Rin Iwanaga / Kie Nakanishi (semi-finals)
3. (Indonesia) Febriana Dwipuji Kusuma / Amalia Cahaya Pratiwi (final)
4. (India) Tanisha Crasto / Ashwini Ponnappa (semi-finals)
5. (China) Li Yijing / Luo Xumin (quarter-finals)
6. (South Korea) Lee Yu-lim / Shin Seung-chan (quarter-finals)
7. (Indonesia) Lanny Tria Mayasari / Ribka Sugiarto (withdrew)
8. (Thailand) Laksika Kanlaha / Phataimas Muenwong (quarter-finals)

=== Finals ===
Semi-finals
1	(Thailand) Jongkolphan Kititharakul (Thailand) Rawinda Prajongjai	21	22
4	(India) Tanisha Crasto (India) Ashwini Ponnappa	12	20
3	(Indonesia) Febriana Dwipuji Kusuma (Indonesia) Amallia Cahaya Pratiwi	21	21
2	(Japan) Rin Iwanaga (Japan) Kie Nakanishi	12	10

Final
1	(Thailand) Jongkolphan Kititharakul (Thailand) Rawinda Prajongjai	21	21
3	(Indonesia) Febriana Dwipuji Kusuma (Indonesia) Amallia Cahaya Pratiwi	14	14

=== Top half ===
==== Section 1 ====
First round
(India) P Arora (India) U Hooda	6	4^{r}
(China) Keng SL (China) Zhang C	21	5
(Thailand) P Pattanawaritthipan (Thailand) A Povanon	17	16
(Chinese Taipei) Huang Y-h (Chinese Taipei) Liang T-y	21	21

Second round
1	(Thailand) J Kititharakul (Thailand) R Prajongjai	21	16	21
(China) Keng SL (China) Zhang C	18	21	10
5	(China) Li YJ (China) Luo XM	21	21
(Chinese Taipei) Huang Y-h (Chinese Taipei) Liang T-y	14	12

Quarter-finals
1	(Thailand) J Kititharakul (Thailand) R Prajongjai	21	22
5	(China) Li YJ (China) Luo XM	6	20

==== Section 2 ====
First round
6	(South Korea) Lee Y-l (South Korea) Shin S-c	21	21
(Thailand) O Jongsathapornparn (Thailand) S Suwachai	15	19
(Thailand) F Korpthammakit (Thailand) P Srisawat	21	4	8
(Hong Kong) Fan K Y (Hong Kong) Yau M Y	11	21	21

Second round
4	(India) T Crasto (India) A Ponnappa	21	21
(Chinese Taipei) Hung E-t (Chinese Taipei) Lin Y-p	19	17
6	(South Korea) Lee Y-l (South Korea) Shin S-c	21	21
(Hong Kong) Fan K Y (Hong Kong) Yau M Y	15	15

Quarter-finals
4	(India) T Crasto (India) A Ponnappa	21	21	21
6	(South Korea) Lee Y-l (South Korea) Shin S-c	15	23	19

=== Bottom half ===
==== Section 3 ====
First round
(Indonesia) M T Puspita Sari (Indonesia) R A Rose
(Ukraine) P Buhrova (Ukraine) Y Kantemyr	w	/	o
(Chinese Taipei) N G Chan (Chinese Taipei) Yang C-y	21	14	19
(Chinese Taipei) Chang C-h (Chinese Taipei) Yang C-t	16	21	21
(Thailand) Y Ketklieng (Thailand) P Phannachet	21	21
(Chinese Taipei) Cheng Y-p (Chinese Taipei) Sun Y-h	15	11

Second round
(Ukraine) P Buhrova (Ukraine) Y Kantemyr	13	10
(Chinese Taipei) Chang C-h (Chinese Taipei) Yang C-t	21	21
(Thailand) Y Ketklieng (Thailand) P Phannachet	9	10
3	(Indonesia) F D Kusuma (Indonesia) A C Pratiwi	21	21

Quarter-finals
(Chinese Taipei) Chang C-h (Chinese Taipei) Yang C-t	16	12
3	(Indonesia) F D Kusuma (Indonesia) A C Pratiwi	21	21

==== Section 4 ====
First round
(Thailand) P Aiamvareesrisakul (Thailand) N Tungkasatan	21	21
(Thailand) P Phatcharaphisutsin (Thailand) N Sukklad	13	17
(Hong Kong) Lui L L (Hong Kong) Tsang H Y	16	12
8	(Thailand) L Kanlaha (Thailand) P Muenwong	21	21
(India) Nk Rapria (India) Ns Rapria	9	5
(India) R Panda (India) S Panda	21	21

Second round
(Thailand) P Aiamvareesrisakul (Thailand) N Tungkasatan	8	14
8	(Thailand) L Kanlaha (Thailand) P Muenwong	21	21
(India) R Panda (India) S Panda	16	13
2	(Japan) R Iwanaga (Japan) K Nakanishi	21	21

Quarter-finals
8	(Thailand) L Kanlaha (Thailand) P Muenwong	22	15
2	(Japan) R Iwanaga (Japan) K Nakanishi	24	21

== Mixed doubles ==
=== Seeds ===
1. (Thailand) Dechapol Puavaranukroh / Sapsiree Taerattanachai (final)
2. (Indonesia) Rinov Rivaldy / Pitha Haningtyas Mentari (semi-finals)
3. (Malaysia) Goh Soon Huat / Shevon Jamie Lai (first round)
4. (Thailand) Supak Jomkoh / Supissara Paewsampran (quarter-finals)
5. (China) Guo Xinwa / Chen Fanghui (champions)
6. (Indonesia) Dejan Ferdinansyah / Gloria Emanuelle Widjaja (quarter-finals)
7. (Indonesia) Rehan Naufal Kusharjanto / Lisa Ayu Kusumawati (quarter-finals)
8. (Denmark) Mads Vestergaard / Christine Busch (second round)

=== Finals ===
Semi-finals
1	(Thailand) Dechapol Puavaranukroh (Thailand) Sapsiree Taerattanachai	21	21
(Thailand) Ruttanapak Oupthong (Thailand) Jhenicha Sudjaipraparat	15	14
5	(China) Guo Xinwa (China) Chen Fanghui	21	21
2	(Indonesia) Rinov Rivaldy (Indonesia) Pitha Haningtyas Mentari	15	14

Final
1	(Thailand) Dechapol Puavaranukroh (Thailand) Sapsiree Taerattanachai	21	12	18
5	(China) Guo Xinwa (China) Chen Fanghui	12	21	21

=== Top half ===
==== Section 1 ====
First round
1	(Thailand) D Puavaranukroh (Thailand) S Taerattanachai	21	21
(South Korea) Kim Y-h (South Korea) Lee Y-l	17	10
(Malaysia) Yap R K (Malaysia) V Siow	21	21
Q3	(Hong Kong) Lui C W (Hong Kong) Fu C Y	19	17
8	(Denmark) M Vestergaard (Denmark) C Busch	21	14	21
(Chinese Taipei) Lu M-c (Chinese Taipei) Hung E-t	11	21	18
Q1	(Hong Kong) Hung K C (Hong Kong) Tsang H Y	12	16
(Indonesia) J Hidayatullah (Indonesia) A S P Pranata	21	21

Second round
1	(Thailand) D Puavaranukroh (Thailand) S Taerattanachai	21	21
(Malaysia) Yap R K (Malaysia) V Siow	11	16
8	(Denmark) M Vestergaard (Denmark) C Busch	20	14
(Indonesia) J Hidayatullah (Indonesia) A S P Pranata	22	21

Quarter-finals
1	(Thailand) D Puavaranukroh (Thailand) S Taerattanachai	21	21
(Indonesia) J Hidayatullah (Indonesia) A S P Pranata	17	11

==== Section 2 ====
First round
3	(Malaysia) Goh S H (Malaysia) Lai S J	21	17	13
(Thailand) R Oupthong (Thailand) J Sudjaipraparat	19	21	21
(Chinese Taipei) Wei C-w (Chinese Taipei) N G Chan	11	11
(Indonesia) A Maulana (Indonesia) N V Marwah	21	21
7	(Indonesia) R N Kusharjanto (Indonesia) L A Kusumawati	21	17	21
(South Korea) Wang C (South Korea) Shin S-c	17	21	12
Q4	(Thailand) N Mangkornloi (Thailand) A Povanon	10	15
(Malaysia) Choong H J (Malaysia) Go P K	21	21

Second round
(Thailand) R Oupthong (Thailand) J Sudjaipraparat	21	21
(Indonesia) A Maulana (Indonesia) N V Marwah	14	18
7	(Indonesia) R N Kusharjanto (Indonesia) L A Kusumawati	21	21
(Malaysia) Choong H J (Malaysia) Go P K	15	15

Quarter-finals
(Thailand) R Oupthong (Thailand) J Sudjaipraparat	21	16	22
7	(Indonesia) R N Kusharjanto (Indonesia) L A Kusumawati	16	21	20

=== Bottom half ===
==== Section 3 ====
First round
PFQ	(Ukraine) O Titov (Ukraine) Y Kantemyr	11	13
(China) Cheng X (China) Li Q	21	21
Q2	(Hong Kong) Yeung S C (Hong Kong) Lui L L	20	15
5	(China) Guo XW (China) Chen FH	22	21
(Chinese Taipei) Wu H-y (Chinese Taipei) Yang C-y	19	21	21
(China) Zhou ZH (China) Yang JY	21	16	15
(Israel) M Zilberman (Israel) S Zilberman	1	4
4	(Thailand) S Jomkoh (Thailand) S Paewsampran	21	21

Second round
(China) Cheng X (China) Li Q	17	24	16
5	(China) Guo XW (China) Chen FH	21	22	21
(Chinese Taipei) Wu H-y (Chinese Taipei) Yang C-y	17	21	12
4	(Thailand) S Jomkoh (Thailand) S Paewsampran	21	16	21

Quarter-finals
5	(China) Guo XW (China) Chen FH	10	21	21
4	(Thailand) S Jomkoh (Thailand) S Paewsampran	21	14	18

==== Section 4 ====
First round
(Chinese Taipei) Lin B-w (Chinese Taipei) Lin C-c	21	21
(Thailand) P Horbanluekit (Thailand) C Korepap	13	9
(Thailand) P Teeraratsakut (Thailand) P Muenwong	21	18	8
6	(Indonesia) D Ferdinansyah (Indonesia) G E Widjaja	18	21	21
(Thailand) T Meechai (Thailand) F Korpthammakit	17	16
(India) S K Karunakaran (India) A Variyath	21	21
(India) B S Reddy (India) N S Reddy	12	16
2	(Indonesia) R Rivaldy (Indonesia) P H Mentari	21	21

Second round
(Chinese Taipei) Lin B-w (Chinese Taipei) Lin C-c	13	18
6	(Indonesia) D Ferdinansyah (Indonesia) G E Widjaja	21	21
(India) S K Karunakaran (India) A Variyath	19	17
2	(Indonesia) R Rivaldy (Indonesia) P H Mentari	21	21

Quarter-finals
6	(Indonesia) D Ferdinansyah (Indonesia) G E Widjaja	19	21
2	(Indonesia) R Rivaldy (Indonesia) P H Mentari	21	23

Preceded by 2024 Spain Masters	BWF World Tour; 2024 BWF season	Succeeded by 2024 Malaysia Masters
