= 2024 Spain Masters =

Badminton tournament in Spain

Tournament details
- Dates: 26–31 March
- Edition: 6th
- Level: Super 300
- Total prize money: US$210,000
- Venue: Centro Deportivo Municipal Gallur
- Location: Madrid, Spain

Champions
- Men's singles: (Singapore) Loh Kean Yew
- Women's singles: (Thailand) Ratchanok Intanon
- Men's doubles: (Indonesia) Sabar Karyaman Gutama (Indonesia) Muhammad Reza Pahlevi Isfahani
- Women's doubles: (Japan) Rin Iwanaga (Japan) Kie Nakanishi
- Mixed doubles: (Indonesia) Rinov Rivaldy (Indonesia) Pitha Haningtyas Mentari

The 2024 Spain Masters (officially known as the Madrid Spain Masters 2024 by Iberdrola for sponsorship reasons) was a badminton tournament that took place at the Centro Deportivo Municipal Gallur, Madrid, Spain, from 26 to 31 March 2024 and had a total prize of US$210,000.

== Tournament ==
The 2024 Spain Masters was the tenth tournament of the 2024 BWF World Tour and was part of the Spain Masters championships, which had been held since 2018. This tournament was organized by the Spanish Badminton Federation with sanction from the BWF.

=== Venue ===
This tournament was held at the Centro Deportivo Municipal Gallur in Madrid, Spain.

=== Point distribution ===
Below is the point distribution table for each phase of the tournament based on the BWF points system for the BWF World Tour Super 300 event.

| Winner | Runner-up | 3/4 | 5/8 | 9/16 | 17/32 | 33/64 | 65/128 |
|---|---|---|---|---|---|---|---|
| 7,000 | 5,950 | 4,900 | 3,850 | 2,750 | 1,670 | 660 | 320 |

=== Prize pool ===
The total prize money is US$210,000 with the distribution of the prize money in accordance with BWF regulations.

| Event | Winner | Finalist | Semi-finals | Quarter-finals | Last 16 |
| Singles | $15,750 | $7,980 | $3,045 | $1,260 | $735 |
| Doubles | $16,590 | $7,980 | $2,940 | $1,522.5 | $787.5 |

== Men's singles ==
=== Seeds ===
1. (Japan) Kenta Nishimoto (withdrew)
2. (Singapore) Loh Kean Yew (champion)
3. (Chinese Taipei) Chou Tien-chen (semi-finals)
4. (Malaysia) Ng Tze Yong (withdrew)
5. (India) Lakshya Sen (withdrew)
6. (Chinese Taipei) Lin Chun-yi (second round)
7. (India) Srikanth Kidambi (first round)
8. (France) Toma Junior Popov (final)

=== Wildcard ===
Spanish Badminton Federation awards a wildcard to Pablo Abián.

=== Finals ===
Semi-finals
8 | (France) Toma Junior Popov | 21 | 20 | 21
3 | (Chinese Taipei) Chou Tien-chen | 15 | 22 | 18
(Chinese Taipei) Wang Tzu-wei | 13 | 21 | 15
2 | (Singapore) Loh Kean Yew | 21 | 8 | 21

Final
8 | (France) Toma Junior Popov | 11 | 21 | 20
2 | (Singapore) Loh Kean Yew | 21 | 15 | 22

=== Top half ===
==== Section 1 ====
First round
PFQ | (Brazil) J Matias | 10 | 19
(Thailand) K Wangcharoen | 21 | 21
PFQ | (South Korea) Jeon H-j | 21 | 14 | 21
(Brazil) Y Coelho | 13 | 21 | 18
8 | (France) T J Popov | 21 | 21
(Netherlands) M Caljouw | 19 | 15
(El Salvador) U Canjura | 13 | 22 | 20
(Chinese Taipei) Su L-y | 21 | 20 | 22

Second round
(Thailand) K Wangcharoen | 21 | 21
PFQ | (South Korea) Jeon H-j | 18 | 17
8 | (France) T J Popov | 21 | 21
(Chinese Taipei) Su L-y | 16 | 15

Quarter-finals
(Thailand) K Wangcharoen | 14 | 13
8 | (France) T J Popov | 21 | 21

==== Section 2 ====
First round
3 | (Chinese Taipei) Chou T-c | 24 | 21
(Republic of Ireland) N Nguyen | 22 | 14
(India) S K Karunakaran | 15 | 19
Q2 | (Singapore) J Teh | 21 | 21
6 | (Chinese Taipei) Lin C-y | 21 | 21
(China) Lei LX | 17 | 18
(Malaysia) Leong J H | 21 | 21
WC | (Spain) P Abián | 16 | 18

Second round
3 | (Chinese Taipei) Chou T-c | 16 | 21 | 22
Q2 | (Singapore) J Teh | 21 | 14 | 20
6 | (Chinese Taipei) Lin C-y | 17 | 18
(Malaysia) Leong J H | 21 | 21

Quarter-finals
3 | (Chinese Taipei) Chou T-c | 21 | 21
(Malaysia) Leong J H | 16 | 12

=== Bottom half ===
==== Section 3 ====
First round
(Chinese Taipei) Wang T-w | 21 | 21
Q4 | (India) M Manjunath | 11 | 12
Q1 | (Japan) K Takahashi | 21 | 21
7 | (India) S Kidambi | 18 | 15
(Belgium) J Carraggi | 22 | 21
(Chinese Taipei) Chi Y-j | 20 | 18
Q3 | (Japan) Y Tanaka | 21 | 21
PFQ | (Finland) K Koljonen | 15 | 10

Second round
(Chinese Taipei) Wang T-w | 21 | 15 | 21
Q1 | (Japan) K Takahashi | 8 | 21 | 13
(Belgium) J Carraggi | 11 | 14
Q3 | (Japan) Y Tanaka | 21 | 21

Quarter-finals
(Chinese Taipei) Wang T-w | 21 | 21
Q3 | (Japan) Y Tanaka | 13 | 13

==== Section 4 ====
First round
(India) K George | 8 | 10
(Chinese Taipei) Lee C-h | 21 | 21
(Japan) T Obayashi | 18 | 20
PFQ | (Denmark) M Christophersen | 21 | 22
(Czech Republic) J Louda
(France) C Popov | w | / | o
PFQ | (Chinese Taipei) Huang Y-k | 8 | 15
2 | (Singapore) Loh K Y | 21 | 21

Second round
(Chinese Taipei) Lee C-h | 21 | 18 | 16
PFQ | (Denmark) M Christophersen | 18 | 21 | 21
(France) C Popov | 21 | 17 | 11
2 | (Singapore) Loh K Y | 19 | 21 | 21

Quarter-finals
PFQ | (Denmark) M Christophersen | 13 | 11
2 | (Singapore) Loh K Y | 21 | 21

== Women's singles ==
=== Seeds ===
1. (Spain) Carolina Marín (withdrew)
2. (India) P. V. Sindhu (quarter-finals)
3. (South Korea) Kim Ga-eun (semi-finals)
4. (Thailand) Ratchanok Intanon (champion)
5. (Thailand) Pornpawee Chochuwong (quarter-finals)
6. (Thailand) Supanida Katethong (final)
7. (Thailand) Busanan Ongbamrungphan (withdrew)
8. (Vietnam) Nguyễn Thùy Linh (second round)

=== Finals ===
Semi-finals
PFQ | (Indonesia) Komang Ayu Cahya Dewi | 12 | 22 | 13
4 | (Thailand) Ratchanok Intanon | 21 | 20 | 21
3 | (South Korea) Kim Ga-eun | 20 | 12
6 | (Thailand) Supanida Katethong | 22 | 21

Final
4 | (Thailand) Ratchanok Intanon | 21 | 21
6 | (Thailand) Supanida Katethong | 12 | 9

=== Top half ===
==== Section 1 ====
First round
PFQ | (Indonesia) K A C Dewi | 21 | 21
Q1 | (Ukraine) P Buhrova | 19 | 15
(Chinese Taipei) Sung S-y | 21 | 21
Q3 | (Japan) A Takahashi | 15 | 18
PFQ | (Japan) M Suizu | 21 | 21 | 18
(Canada) M Li | 23 | 18 | 21
(Japan) T Miyazaki | 15 | 9
(Thailand) P Choeikeewong | 21 | 21

Second round
PFQ | (Indonesia) K A C Dewi | 21 | 21
(Chinese Taipei) Sung S-y | 11 | 14
(Canada) M Li | 14 | 11
(Thailand) P Choeikeewong | 21 | 21

Quarter-finals
PFQ | (Indonesia) K A C Dewi | 21 | 21
(Thailand) P Choeikeewong | 14 | 16

==== Section 2 ====
First round
4 | (Thailand) R Intanon | 21 | 21
(India) A Chaliha | 13 | 11
(Chinese Taipei) Hsu W-c | 15 | 21 | 19
(Scotland) K Gilmour | 21 | 18 | 21
5 | (Thailand) P Chochuwong | 21 | 23
(Chinese Taipei) Lin H-t | 12 | 21
(Indonesia) P K Wardani | 21 | 18 | 21
(Myanmar) Thet Htar T | 16 | 21 | 16

Second round
4 | (Thailand) R Intanon | 21 | 21
(Scotland) K Gilmour | 14 | 17
5 | (Thailand) P Chochuwong | 21 | 22
(Indonesia) P K Wardani | 14 | 20

Quarter-finals
4 | (Thailand) R Intanon | 19 | 21 | 21
5 | (Thailand) P Chochuwong | 21 | 9 | 19

=== Bottom half ===
==== Section 3 ====
First round
(Indonesia) E N T Wardoyo | 21 | 21
(Brazil) J Vieira | 17 | 14
Q2 | (Australia) T Ho | 10 | 9
8 | (Vietnam) Nguyễn T L | 21 | 21
PFQ | (Peru) I Castillo | 18 | 18
PFQ | (Chinese Taipei) Liang T-y | 21 | 21
(Chinese Taipei) Pai Y-p | 14 | 0^{r}
3 | (South Korea) Kim G-e | 21 | 5

Second round
(Indonesia) E N T Wardoyo | 21 | 21
8 | (Vietnam) Nguyễn T L | 12 | 15
PFQ | (Chinese Taipei) Liang T-y | 16 | 11
3 | (South Korea) Kim G-e | 21 | 21

Quarter-finals
(Indonesia) E N T Wardoyo | 19 | 16
3 | (South Korea) Kim G-e | 21 | 21

==== Section 4 ====
First round
(Japan) N Nidaira | 11 | 21 | 21
Q4 | (Spain) C Azurmendi | 21 | 13 | 17
(United States) L Lam | 21 | 16 | 16
6 | (Thailand) S Katethong | 19 | 21 | 21
(United States) I Wang | 20 | 21
PFQ | (Chinese Taipei) Huang Y-h | 22 | 23
(Canada) W Y Zhang | 16 | 12
2 | (India) P. V. Sindhu | 21 | 21

Second round
(Japan) N Nidaira | 13 | 21 | 17
6 | (Thailand) S Katethong | 21 | 14 | 21
PFQ | (Chinese Taipei) Huang Y-h | 14 | 12
2 | (India) P. V. Sindhu | 21 | 21

Quarter-finals
6 | (Thailand) S Katethong | 24 | 21 | 22
2 | (India) P. V. Sindhu | 26 | 17 | 20

== Men's doubles ==
=== Seeds ===
1. (Malaysia) Ong Yew Sin / Teo Ee Yi (withdrew)
2. (England) Ben Lane / Sean Vendy (withdrew)
3. (Scotland) Alexander Dunn / Adam Hall (first round)
4. (Canada) Adam Dong / Nyl Yakura (first round)
5. (France) Lucas Corvée / Ronan Labar (second round)
6. (Thailand) Pharanyu Kaosamaang / Worrapol Thongsa-nga (first round)
7. (Canada) Kevin Lee / Ty Alexander Lindeman (first round)
8. (India) Arjun M. R. / Dhruv Kapila (quarter-finals)

=== Finals ===
Semi-finals
(Denmark) William Kryger Boe (Denmark) Christian Faust Kjær | 15 | 21 | 15
(Indonesia) Sabar Karyaman Gutama (Indonesia) Muhammad Reza Pahlevi Isfahani | 21 | 16 | 21
(France) Christo Popov (France) Toma Junior Popov | 17 | 17
(Malaysia) Junaidi Arif (Malaysia) Yap Roy King | 21 | 21

Final
(Indonesia) Sabar Karyaman Gutama (Indonesia) Muhammad Reza Pahlevi Isfahani | 21 | 17 | 21
(Malaysia) Junaidi Arif (Malaysia) Yap Roy King | 18 | 21 | 19

=== Top half ===
==== Section 1 ====
First round
PFQ | (China) Chen BY (China) Liu Ya | 21 | 21
WC | (Spain) R García (Spain) C Piris | 18 | 17
(Denmark) W K Boe (Denmark) C F Kjær | 21 | 21
(Malaysia) Low H Y (Malaysia) Ng E C | 16 | 19
6 | (Thailand) P Kaosamaang (Thailand) W Thongsa-nga | 17 | 15
(Japan) S Mezaki (Japan) H Nishida | 21 | 21
Q4 | (Netherlands) T van der Lecq (Netherlands) B Wassink | 8 | 17
(United States) Chen Z-y (United States) P Smith | 21 | 21

Second round
PFQ | (China) Chen BY (China) Liu Ya | 21 | 21 | 15
(Denmark) W K Boe (Denmark) C F Kjær | 16 | 23 | 21
(Japan) S Mezaki (Japan) H Nishida | 20 | 19
(United States) Chen Z-y (United States) P Smith | 22 | 21

Quarter-finals
(Denmark) W K Boe (Denmark) C F Kjær | 21 | 21
(United States) Chen Z-y (United States) P Smith | 16 | 14

==== Section 2 ====
First round
3 | (Scotland) A Dunn (Scotland) A Hall | 21 | 16 | 14
Q1 | (Japan) K Matsui (Japan) K Tamate | 19 | 21 | 21
(Indonesia) S K Gutama (Indonesia) M R P Isfahani | 21 | 21
(Chinese Taipei) Chen C-k (Chinese Taipei) Chen S-f | 14 | 14
7 | (Canada) K Lee (Canada) T A Lindeman | 21 | 19 | 20
(United States) V Chiu (United States) J Yuan | 17 | 21 | 22
(Republic of Ireland) J Magee (Republic of Ireland) P Reynolds | 21 | 20 | 13
(Germany) B Geiss (Germany) J C Völker | 17 | 22 | 21

Second round
Q1 | (Japan) K Matsui (Japan) K Tamate | 11 | 21
(Indonesia) S K Gutama (Indonesia) M R P Isfahani | 21 | 23
(United States) V Chiu (United States) J Yuan | 24 | 20
(Germany) B Geiss (Germany) J C Völker | 26 | 22

Quarter-finals
(Indonesia) S K Gutama (Indonesia) M R P Isfahani | 21 | 21
(Germany) B Geiss (Germany) J C Völker | 12 | 10

=== Bottom half ===
==== Section 3 ====
First round
Q2 | (China) Huang D (China) Liu Yi | 21 | 21
Q3 | (China) Xie HN (China) Zeng WH | 18 | 12
(Chinese Taipei) Wei C-w (Chinese Taipei) Wu G-x | 10 | 23 | 18
5 | (France) L Corvée (France) R Labar | 21 | 21 | 21
(France) C Popov (France) T J Popov | 21 | 21 | 21
(Brazil) F Farias (Brazil) D Silva | 23 | 12 | 18
(India) K P Garaga (India) K S Pratheek | 21 | 28 | 21
4 | (Canada) A Dong (Canada) N Yakura | 15 | 30 | 11

Second round
Q2 | (China) Huang D (China) Liu Yi | 21 | 21
5 | (France) L Corvée (France) R Labar | 8 | 14
(France) C Popov (France) T J Popov | 21 | 15 | 21
(India) K P Garaga (India) K S Pratheek | 16 | 21 | 16

Quarter-finals
Q2 | (China) Huang D (China) Liu Yi | 21 | 18 | 18
(France) C Popov (France) T J Popov | 14 | 21 | 21

==== Section 4 ====
First round
(Scotland) C Grimley (Scotland) M Grimley | 21 | 21
(Czech Republic) O Král (Czech Republic) A Mendrek | 18 | 11
(Mexico) J Castillo (Mexico) L Montoya | 18 | 17
8 | (India) Arjun M. R. (India) D Kapila | 21 | 21
(Algeria) K Mammeri (Algeria) Y S Medel | 12 | 10
(Chinese Taipei) Lu C (Chinese Taipei) Po L-w | 21 | 21
(Malaysia) J Arif (Malaysia) Yap R K | 21 | 21
PFQ | (Chinese Taipei) Lu M-c (Chinese Taipei) Tang K-w | 18 | 9

Second round
(Scotland) C Grimley (Scotland) M Grimley | 17 | 19
8 | (India) Arjun M. R. (India) D Kapila | 21 | 21
(Chinese Taipei) Lu C (Chinese Taipei) Po L-w | 21 | 15 | 22
(Malaysia) J Arif (Malaysia) Yap R K | 18 | 21 | 24

Quarter-finals
8 | (India) Arjun M. R. (India) D Kapila | 19 | 23 | 17
(Malaysia) J Arif (Malaysia) Yap R K | 21 | 21 | 21

== Women's doubles ==
=== Seeds ===
1. (Japan) Rin Iwanaga / Kie Nakanishi (champions)
2. (Indonesia) Febriana Dwipuji Kusuma / Amallia Cahaya Pratiwi (final)
3. (India) Tanisha Crasto / Ashwini Ponnappa (quarter-finals)
4. (France) Margot Lambert / Anne Tran (withdrew)
5. (India) Treesa Jolly / Gayatri Gopichand (first round)
6. (Chinese Taipei) Lee Chia-hsin / Teng Chun-hsun (semi-finals)
7. (Bulgaria) Gabriela Stoeva / Stefani Stoeva (quarter-finals)
8. (Chinese Taipei) Hsu Ya-ching / Lin Wan-ching (quarter-finals)

=== Finals ===
Semi-finals
1 | (Japan) Rin Iwanaga (Japan) Kie Nakanishi | 21 | 21
(Chinese Taipei) Chang Ching-hui (Chinese Taipei) Yang Ching-tun | 11 | 9
6 | (Chinese Taipei) Lee Chia-hsin (Chinese Taipei) Teng Chun-hsun | 12 | 7
2 | (Indonesia) Febriana Dwipuji Kusuma (Indonesia) Amallia Cahaya Pratiwi | 21 | 21

Final
1 | (Japan) Rin Iwanaga (Japan) Kie Nakanishi | 12 | 21 | 21
2 | (Indonesia) Febriana Dwipuji Kusuma (Indonesia) Amallia Cahaya Pratiwi | 21 | 8 | 16

=== Top half ===
==== Section 1 ====
First round
1 | (Japan) R Iwanaga (Japan) K Nakanishi | 21 | 21
Q2 | (Ukraine) P Buhrova (Ukraine) Y Kantemyr | 19 | 10
Q4 | (Chinese Taipei) Huang Y-h (Chinese Taipei) Liang T-y | 20 | 21 | 21
(Brazil) J Lima (Brazil) S Lima | 22 | 11 | 15
7 | (Bulgaria) G Stoeva (Bulgaria) S Stoeva | 24 | 21
(Denmark) J Finne-Ipsen (Denmark) M Surrow | 22 | 13
PFQ | (Germany) J Meyer (Germany) L Michalski | 11 | 17
WC | (Spain) P López (Spain) L Rodríguez | 21 | 21

Second round
1 | (Japan) R Iwanaga (Japan) K Nakanishi | 21 | 21
Q4 | (Chinese Taipei) Huang Y-h (Chinese Taipei) Liang T-y | 17 | 17
7 | (Bulgaria) G Stoeva (Bulgaria) S Stoeva | 21 | 21
WC | (Spain) P López (Spain) L Rodríguez | 15 | 12

Quarter-finals
1 | (Japan) R Iwanaga (Japan) K Nakanishi | 14 | 21 | 21
7 | (Bulgaria) G Stoeva (Bulgaria) S Stoeva | 21 | 14 | 16

==== Section 2 ====
First round
PFQ | (Poland) P Hankiewicz (Poland) K Marczak | 11 | 11
(Japan) M Kawazoe (Japan) H Konishi | 21 | 21
(China) Keng SL (China) Zhang C | 21 | 21
(United States) P L Cao Hok (United States) L Lam | 11 | 19
5 | (India) T Jolly (India) G Gopichand | 18 | 22 | 18
(United States) A Xu (United States) K Xu | 21 | 20 | 21
(Chinese Taipei) Chang C-h (Chinese Taipei) Yang C-t | 21 | 21
Q1 | (Poland) D Kwaśnik (Poland) K Szubert | 13 | 10

Second round
(Japan) M Kawazoe (Japan) H Konishi | 10 | 18
(China) Keng SL (China) Zhang C | 21 | 21
(United States) A Xu (United States) K Xu | 12 | 21 | 19
(Chinese Taipei) Chang C-h (Chinese Taipei) Yang C-t | 21 | 17 | 21

Quarter-finals
(China) Keng SL (China) Zhang C | 14 | 16
(Chinese Taipei) Chang C-h (Chinese Taipei) Yang C-t | 21 | 21

=== Bottom half ===
==== Section 3 ====
First round
(South Africa) A Ackerman (South Africa) D Laurens | 8 | 11
(Scotland) J MacPherson (Scotland) C Torrance | 21 | 21
PFQ | (Uganda) H Kobugabe (Uganda) G Mbabazi | 4 | 11
6 | (Chinese Taipei) Lee C-h (Chinese Taipei) Teng C-h | 21 | 21
PFQ | (Australia) T Ho (Australia) G Somerville | 21 | 21
PFQ | (Uganda) F Mohamed Rafi (Uganda) T Naluwooza | 14 | 11
Q3
3 | (India) T Crasto (India) A Ponnappa | w | / | o

Second round
(Scotland) J MacPherson (Scotland) C Torrance | 14 | 12
6 | (Chinese Taipei) Lee C-h (Chinese Taipei) Teng C-h | 21 | 21
PFQ | (Australia) T Ho (Australia) G Somerville | 14 | 8
3 | (India) T Crasto (India) A Ponnappa | 21 | 21

Quarter-finals
6 | (Chinese Taipei) Lee C-h (Chinese Taipei) Teng C-h | 21 | 21
3 | (India) T Crasto (India) A Ponnappa | 13 | 19

==== Section 4 ====
First round
PFQ | (Denmark) A C Kudsk (Denmark) S Schulz | 21 | 18 | 21
(United States) F Corbett (United States) A Lee | 9 | 21 | 16
(Chinese Taipei) Hsu Y-h (Chinese Taipei) Lin J-y | 15 | 14
8 | (Chinese Taipei) Hsu Y-c (Chinese Taipei) Lin W-c | 21 | 21
(Japan) R Hirokami (Japan) Y Kato | 21 | 21
PFQ | (China) Wang TG (China) Wang YD | 14 | 14
(Indonesia) J P Miantoro (Indonesia) F Setianingrum | 17 | 13
2 | (Indonesia) F D Kusuma (Indonesia) A C Pratiwi | 21 | 21

Second round
PFQ | (Denmark) A C Kudsk (Denmark) S Schulz | 9 | 16
8 | (Chinese Taipei) Hsu Y-c (Chinese Taipei) Lin W-c | 21 | 21
(Japan) R Hirokami (Japan) Y Kato | 11 | 7
2 | (Indonesia) F D Kusuma (Indonesia) A C Pratiwi | 21 | 21

Quarter-finals
8 | (Chinese Taipei) Hsu Y-c (Chinese Taipei) Lin W-c | 18 | 19
2 | (Indonesia) F D Kusuma (Indonesia) A C Pratiwi | 21 | 21

== Mixed doubles ==
=== Seeds ===
1. (China) Jiang Zhenbang / Wei Yaxin (withdrew)
2. (France) Thom Gicquel / Delphine Delrue (semi-finals)
3. (Malaysia) Goh Soon Huat / Shevon Jemie Lai (first round)
4. (Indonesia) Rehan Naufal Kusharjanto / Lisa Ayu Kusumawati (quarter-finals)
5. (Netherlands) Robin Tabeling / Selena Piek (first round)
6. (Indonesia) Rinov Rivaldy / Pitha Haningtyas Mentari (champions)
7. (Indonesia) Dejan Ferdinansyah / Gloria Emanuelle Widjaja (first round)
8. (Singapore) Terry Hee / Jessica Tan (first round)

=== Finals ===
Semi-finals
6 | (Indonesia) Rinov Rivaldy (Indonesia) Pitha Haningtyas Mentari | 21 | 21
(India) B. Sumeeth Reddy (India) N. Sikki Reddy | 17 | 12
(China) Cheng Xing (China) Zhang Chi | 10 | 21 | 21
2 | (France) Thom Gicquel (France) Delphine Delrue | 21 | 19 | 19

Final
6 | (Indonesia) Rinov Rivaldy (Indonesia) Pitha Haningtyas Mentari | 17 | 21 | 21
(China) Cheng Xing (China) Zhang Chi | 21 | 12 | 13

=== Top half ===
==== Section 1 ====
First round
PFQ | (Chinese Taipei) Chen C-k (Chinese Taipei) Hsu Y-h | 21 | 21
(Australia) K Choo (Australia) G Somerville | 13 | 8
PFQ | (Germany) P Scheiel (Germany) F Volkmann | 12 | 21 | 24
WC | (Spain) R García (Spain) L Rodríguez | 21 | 19 | 26
6 | (Indonesia) R Rivaldy (Indonesia) P H Mentari | 21 | 21
(India) S K Karunakaran (India) A Variyath | 18 | 14
(Scotland) A Hall (Scotland) J MacPherson | 21 | 21
(United States) V Chiu (United States) J Gai | 16 | 18

Second round
PFQ | (Chinese Taipei) Chen C-k (Chinese Taipei) Hsu Y-h | 15 | 21 | 21
WC | (Spain) R García (Spain) L Rodríguez | 21 | 17 | 14
6 | (Indonesia) R Rivaldy (Indonesia) P H Mentari | 21 | 21
(Scotland) A Hall (Scotland) J MacPherson | 17 | 11

Quarter-finals
PFQ | (Chinese Taipei) Chen C-k (Chinese Taipei) Hsu Y-h | 5 | 10
6 | (Indonesia) R Rivaldy (Indonesia) P H Mentari | 21 | 21

==== Section 2 ====
First round
4 | (Indonesia) R N Kusharjanto (Indonesia) L A Kusumawati | 17 | 21 | 21
(Malaysia) Yap R K (Malaysia) V Siow | 21 | 19 | 18
(Thailand) R Oupthong (Thailand) J Sudjaipraparat | 16 | 16
(Indonesia) A Maulana (Indonesia) N V Marwah | 21 | 21
7 | (Indonesia) D Ferdinansyah (Indonesia) G E Widjaja | 17 | 23
(United States) P Smith (United States) A Lee | 21 | 25
(India) B S Reddy (India) N S Reddy | 16 | 22 | 21
PFQ | (Chinese Taipei) Chen Z-r (Chinese Taipei) Yang C-t | 21 | 20 | 14

Second round
4 | (Indonesia) R N Kusharjanto (Indonesia) L A Kusumawati | 21 | 21
(Indonesia) A Maulana (Indonesia) N V Marwah | 19 | 10
(United States) P Smith (United States) A Lee | 20 | 18
(India) B S Reddy (India) N S Reddy | 22 | 21

Quarter-finals
4 | (Indonesia) R N Kusharjanto (Indonesia) L A Kusumawati | 21 | 11 | 17
(India) B S Reddy (India) N S Reddy | 14 | 21 | 21

=== Bottom half ===
==== Section 3 ====
First round
(Chinese Taipei) Chang K-c (Chinese Taipei) Lee C-c | 22 | 21
Q3 | (Chinese Taipei) Po L-w (Chinese Taipei) Chang C-h | 20 | 18
(Denmark) R Espersen (Denmark) A C Kudsk | 10 | 21 | 21
5 | (Netherlands) R Tabeling (Netherlands) S Piek | 21 | 19 | 15
PFQ | (Indonesia) J Hidayatullah (Indonesia) A S P Pranata | 21 | 21
Q2 | (Brazil) D Silva (Brazil) S Lima | 12 | 16
(China) Cheng X (China) Zhang C | 21 | 21
3 | (Malaysia) Goh S H (Malaysia) S J Lai | 18 | 18

Second round
(Chinese Taipei) Chang K-c (Chinese Taipei) Lee C-c | 21 | 22
(Denmark) R Espersen (Denmark) A C Kudsk | 11 | 20
PFQ | (Indonesia) J Hidayatullah (Indonesia) A S P Pranata | 20 | 19
(China) Cheng X (China) Zhang C | 22 | 21

Quarter-finals
(Chinese Taipei) Chang K-c (Chinese Taipei) Lee C-c | 21 | 18
(China) Cheng X (China) Zhang C | 23 | 21

==== Section 4 ====
First round
(Brazil) F Farias (Brazil) J Lima | 19 | 12
(Japan) H Nishi (Japan) A Sato | 21 | 21
(England) G Mairs (England) J Mairs | 21 | 22
8 | (Singapore) T Hee (Singapore) J Tan | 18 | 20
Q4 | (Germany) M Bourakkadi (Germany) L Michalski | 19 | 25 | 13
Q1 | (Spain) J Fernández (Spain) P López | 21 | 23 | 21
(Algeria) K Mammeri (Algeria) T Mammeri | 13 | 14
2 | (France) T Gicquel (France) D Delrue | 21 | 21

Second round
(Japan) H Nishi (Japan) A Sato | 21 | 15 | 16
(England) G Mairs (England) J Mairs | 15 | 21 | 21
Q1 | (Spain) J Fernández (Spain) P López | 9 | 15
2 | (France) T Gicquel (France) D Delrue | 21 | 21

Quarter-finals
(England) G Mairs (England) J Mairs | 19 | 10
2 | (France) T Gicquel (France) D Delrue | 21 | 21

| Preceded by 2024 Swiss Open; 2024 Ruichang China Masters | BWF World Tour; 2024 BWF season | Succeeded by 2024 Thailand Open |
