= 2025 Macau Open (badminton) =

2025 badminton tournament

Tournament details
- Dates: 29 July – 3 August
- Edition: 17th
- Total prize money: US$370,000
- Venue: Macau East Asian Games Dome

Champions
- Men's singles: (Indonesia) Alwi Farhan
- Women's singles: (China) Chen Yufei
- Men's doubles: (Malaysia) Junaidi Arif (Malaysia) Yap Roy King
- Women's doubles: (Chinese Taipei) Hsieh Pei-shan (Chinese Taipei) Hung En-tzu
- Mixed doubles: (Denmark) Mathias Christiansen (Denmark) Alexandra Bøje
- Official website: Macau Open

The 2025 Macau Open, officially known as the Sands China Macau Open 2025 for sponsorship reasons, was a badminton tournament. It took place at the Macau East Asian Games Dome in Macau from 29 July to 3 August 2025 and had a total prize of $370,000.

== Tournament ==
The 2025 Macau Open was the nineteenth tournament of the 2025 BWF World Tour and also part of the Macau Open championships, which had been held since 2006. This tournament is organized by Badminton Federation of Macau and sanctioned by the BWF.

=== Venue ===
This international tournament had been held at Macau East Asian Games Dome in Macau.

=== Point distribution ===
Below was the point distribution table for each phase of the tournament based on the BWF points system for the BWF World Tour Super 300 event.

Winner	Runner-up	3/4	5/8	9/16	17/32	33/64	65/128
7,000	5,950	4,900	3,850	2,750	1,670	660	320

=== Prize money ===
The total prize money for this tournament was US$370,000. Distribution of prize money was in accordance with BWF regulations.

Event	Winner	Finals	Semi-finals	Quarter-finals	Last 16
Singles	$27,750	$14,060	$5,365	$2,220	$1,295
Doubles	$29,230	$14,060	$5,180	$2,682.50	$1,387.50

== Men's singles ==
=== Seeds ===
1. (Hong Kong) Lee Cheuk Yiu (second round)
2. (India) Lakshya Sen (semi-finals)
3. (Hong Kong) Ng Ka Long (second round)
4. (Singapore) Jason Teh (second round)
5. (Indonesia) Alwi Farhan (champion)
6. (Chinese Taipei) Chi Yu-jen (first round)
7. (India) Ayush Shetty (second round)
8. (Canada) Brian Yang (second round)

=== Finals ===
Semi-finals
(India) Tharun Mannepalli	21	16	16
(Malaysia) Justin Hoh	19	21	21
5	(Indonesia) Alwi Farhan	21	21
2	(India) Lakshya Sen	16	9

Final
(Malaysia) Justin Hoh	15	5
5	(Indonesia) Alwi Farhan	21	21

=== Top half ===
==== Section 1 ====
First round
1	(Hong Kong) Lee C Y	21	21
(Macau) Pui P F	18	19
(India) M Singh	19	13
(India) T Mannepalli	21	21
8	(Canada) B Yang	22	21
(Malaysia) Aidil S	20	7
Q3	(China) Hu ZA	21	21
(India) S Subramanian	18	14

Second round
1	(Hong Kong) Lee C Y	21	14	20
(India) T Mannepalli	19	21	22
8	(Canada) B Yang	13	14
Q3	(China) Hu ZA	21	21

Quarter-finals
(India) T Mannepalli	21	13	21
Q3	(China) Hu ZA	12	21	18

==== Section 2 ====
First round
4	(Singapore) J Teh	21	21
(Sri Lanka) V Nettasinghe	13	13
Q1	(South Korea) Kim B-j	8	18
(Thailand) K Wangcharoen	21	21
7	(India) A Shetty	21	21
(Chinese Taipei) Huang Y-k	10	11
(Malaysia) J Hoh	21	21
(India) S Karunakaran	19	12

Second round
4	(Singapore) J Teh	15	21	16
(Thailand) K Wangcharoen	21	17	21
7	(India) A Shetty	18	16
(Malaysia) J Hoh	21	21

Quarter-finals
(Thailand) K Wangcharoen	9	18
(Malaysia) J Hoh	21	21

=== Bottom half ===
==== Section 3 ====
First round
(Indonesia) Z Ubaidillah	21	21
(Denmark) M Christophersen	19	16
(Malaysia) Cheam J W	16	14
5	(Indonesia) A Farhan	21	21
(Israel) M Zilberman	10	10
(Hong Kong) J Gunawan	21	21
(India) K George	15	10
3	(Hong Kong) Ng K L	21	21

Second round
(Indonesia) Z Ubaidillah	21	17	17
5	(Indonesia) A Farhan	19	21	21
(Hong Kong) J Gunawan	21	16	21
3	(Hong Kong) Ng K L	18	21	14

Quarter-finals
5	(Indonesia) A Farhan	21	21
(Hong Kong) J Gunawan	17	15

==== Section 4 ====
First round
Q2	(Indonesia) Y S Marcellyno	18	21	21
(India) Prannoy H. S.	21	15	16
Q4	(China) Zhu XC	21	21
6	(Chinese Taipei) Chi Y-j	12	13
(Indonesia) C A Dwi Wardoyo	21	21
(India) R Sanjeevi	16	8
(South Korea) Jeon H-j	8	14
2	(India) L Sen	21	21

Second round
Q2	(Indonesia) Y S Marcellyno	21	19	6
Q4	(China) Zhu XC	15	21	21
(Indonesia) C A Dwi Wardoyo	14	21	17
2	(India) L Sen	21	14	21

Quarter-finals
Q4	(China) Zhu XC	14	21	14
2	(India) L Sen	21	18	21

== Women's singles ==
=== Seeds ===
1. (China) Chen Yufei (champion)
2. (Thailand) Busanan Ongbamrungphan (quarter-finals)
3. (Chinese Taipei) Chiu Pin-chian (first round)
4. (Chinese Taipei) Lin Hsiang-ti (semi-finals)
5. (Japan) Natsuki Nidaira (quarter-finals)
6. (Japan) Riko Gunji (semi-finals)
7. (Denmark) Julie Dawall Jakobsen (second round)
8. (Japan) Manami Suizu (first round)

=== Finals ===
Semi-finals
1	(China) Chen Yufei	21	21
4	(Chinese Taipei) Lin Hsiang-ti	10	19
(Denmark) Line Christophersen	12	21	21
6	(Japan) Riko Gunji	21	8	19

Final
1	(China) Chen Yufei	21	21
(Denmark) Line Christophersen	17	17

=== Top half ===
==== Section 1 ====
First round
1	(China) Chen YF	21	21
Q3	(India) T Mir	6	14
Q4	(Denmark) A Schulz	14	12
(Malaysia) Goh J W	21	21
8	(Japan) M Suizu	15	13
(Japan) A Takahashi	21	21
(India) A Kashyap	14	16
(Japan) N Okuhara	21	21

Second round
1	(China) Chen YF	14	21	21
(Malaysia) Goh J W	21	9	18
(Japan) A Takahashi	18	17
(Japan) N Okuhara	21	21

Quarter-finals
1	(China) Chen YF	21	21
(Japan) N Okuhara	5	8

==== Section 2 ====
First round
4	(Chinese Taipei) Lin H-t	21	29
(Chinese Taipei) Tung C-t	12	27
(Malaysia) Letshanaa K	13	22	19
(Hong Kong) Lo S Y	21	20	21
5	(Japan) N Nidaira	21	21
(Thailand) L Chaiwan	18	10
(Indonesia) K A C Dewi	17	22	15
(China) Han QX	21	20	21

Second round
4	(Chinese Taipei) Lin H-t	21	21
(Hong Kong) Lo S Y	17	17
5	(Japan) N Nidaira	21	21
(China) Han QX	17	18

Quarter-finals
4	(Chinese Taipei) Lin H-t	22	21
5	(Japan) N Nidaira	20	14

=== Bottom half ===
==== Section 3 ====
First round
(Japan) H Akechi	21	21
Q1	(Thailand) P Opatniputh	18	10
(India) U Hooda	21	19	17
7	(Denmark) J D Jakobsen	16	21	21
PFQ	(Chinese Taipei) Hung Y-t	10	13
(China) Wu LY	21	21
(Denmark) L Christophersen	21	13	21
3	(Chinese Taipei) Chiu P-c	13	21	18

Second round
(Japan) H Akechi	21	21
7	(Denmark) J D Jakobsen	16	18
(China) Wu LY	10	16
(Denmark) L Christophersen	21	21

Quarter-finals
(Japan) H Akechi	7	11
(Denmark) L Christophersen	21	21

==== Section 4 ====
First round
(Chinese Taipei) Hsu W-c	21	21
(Macau) Chan H W	13	16
(India) A Upadhyaya	16	10
6	(Japan) R Gunji	21	21
(Thailand) P Choeikeewong	21	17	20
(India) R Ramraj	18	21	22
Q2	(India) A Kharb	21	11
2	(Thailand) B Ongbamrungphan	23	21

Second round
(Chinese Taipei) Hsu W-c	18	8
6	(Japan) R Gunji	21	21
(India) R Ramraj	21	10	11
2	(Thailand) B Ongbamrungphan	14	21	21

Quarter-finals
6	(Japan) R Gunji	21	21
2	(Thailand) B Ongbamrungphan	19	17

== Men's doubles ==
=== Seeds ===
1. (Indonesia) Sabar Karyaman Gutama / Muhammad Reza Pahlevi Isfahani (final)
2. (India) Satwiksairaj Rankireddy / Chirag Shetty (quarter-finals)
3. (Chinese Taipei) Lee Fang-chih / Lee Fang-jen (semi-finals)
4. (Malaysia) Junaidi Arif / Yap Roy King (champions)
5. (Malaysia) Nur Mohd Azriyn Ayub / Tan Wee Kiong (quarter-finals)
6. (Malaysia) Ong Yew Sin / Teo Ee Yi (first round)
7. (Japan) Takumi Nomura / Yuichi Shimogami (first round)
8. (India) Hariharan Amsakarunan / Ruban Kumar (first round)

=== Finals ===
Semi-finals
1	(Indonesia) Sabar Karyaman Gutama (Indonesia) Muhammad Reza Pahlevi Isfahani	21	21
3	(Chinese Taipei) Lee Fang-chih (Chinese Taipei) Lee Fang-jen	19	17
4	(Malaysia) Junaidi Arif (Malaysia) Yap Roy King	21	21
(Malaysia) Choong Hon Jian (Malaysia) Muhammad Haikal	13	15

Final
1	(Indonesia) Sabar Karyaman Gutama (Indonesia) Muhammad Reza Pahlevi Isfahani	20	18
4	(Malaysia) Junaidi Arif (Malaysia) Yap Roy King	22	21

=== Top half ===
==== Section 1 ====
First round
1	(Indonesia) S K Gutama (Indonesia) M R P Isfahani	21	21
(Malaysia) Kang K X (Malaysia) A Tai	17	16
Q2	(Thailand) P Kaosamaang (Thailand) T Punpanich	21	16	11
Q4	(Japan) K Matsui (Japan) K Tamate	15	21	21
6	(Malaysia) Ong Y S (Malaysia) Teo E Y	15	21	21
(Indonesia) R Hidayat (Indonesia) Y Rambitan	21	16	23
(Chinese Taipei) Su C-h (Chinese Taipei) Wu G-x	15	16
(South Korea) Choi S-g (Malaysia) Goh V S	21	21

Second round
1	(Indonesia) S K Gutama (Indonesia) M R P Isfahani	21	15	21
Q4	(Japan) K Matsui (Japan) K Tamate	11	21	11
(Indonesia) R Hidayat (Indonesia) Y Rambitan	18	18
(South Korea) Choi S-g (Malaysia) Goh V S	21	21

Quarter-finals
1	(Indonesia) S K Gutama (Indonesia) M R P Isfahani	21	21
(South Korea) Choi S-g (Malaysia) Goh V S	18	13

==== Section 2 ====
First round
3	(Chinese Taipei) Lee F-c (Chinese Taipei) Lee F-j	21	21
(Indonesia) R Indra (Indonesia) N Joaquin	13	14
(Canada) K Lee (Canada) T A Lindeman	11	17
(Chinese Taipei) He Z-w (Chinese Taipei) Huang J-h	21	21
7	(Japan) T Nomura (Japan) Y Shimogami	19	19
(Malaysia) Chia W J (Malaysia) Lwi S H	21	21
(Hong Kong) Hung K C (Hong Kong) Lui C W	21	21
(Macau) Leong I C (Macau) Vong K W	8	9

Second round
3	(Chinese Taipei) Lee F-c (Chinese Taipei) Lee F-j	21	21
(Chinese Taipei) He Z-w (Chinese Taipei) Huang J-h	13	15
(Malaysia) Chia W J (Malaysia) Lwi S H	21	13	18
(Hong Kong) Hung K C (Hong Kong) Lui C W	15	21	21

Quarter-finals
3	(Chinese Taipei) Lee F-c (Chinese Taipei) Lee F-j	21	21
(Hong Kong) Hung K C (Hong Kong) Lui C W	15	13

=== Bottom half ===
==== Section 3 ====
First round
(Malaysia) B Goonting (Malaysia) Fazriq R	11	20
(Indonesia) P Erwiansyah (Indonesia) D E Marvino	21	22
Q1	(Chinese Taipei) Lai P-y (Chinese Taipei) Tsai F-c	18	15
5	(Malaysia) N M Azriyn A (Malaysia) Tan W K	21	21
(India) P Roy (India) K Sai Pratheek	21	21
Q3	(India) D S Konthoujam (India) A Mohammad	18	19
(China) Ren XY (China) Sun WJ	15	16
4	(Malaysia) J Arif (Malaysia) Yap R K	21	21

Second round
(Indonesia) P Erwiansyah (Indonesia) D E Marvino	14	21	17
5	(Malaysia) N M Azriyn A (Malaysia) Tan W K	21	15	21
(India) P Roy (India) K Sai Pratheek	18	18
4	(Malaysia) J Arif (Malaysia) Yap R K	21	21

Quarter-finals
5	(Malaysia) N M Azriyn A (Malaysia) Tan W K	12	16
4	(Malaysia) J Arif (Malaysia) Yap R K	21	21

==== Section 4 ====
First round
(Malaysia) Choong H J (Malaysia) M Haikal	21	21
(Singapore) W Koh (Singapore) J Kubo	15	14
(Japan) T Aizawa (Japan) D Sano	15	21	21
8	(India) H Amsakarunan (India) R Kumar	21	19	14
(South Korea) Jin Y (South Korea) Na S-s	19	17
(Japan) K Kumagai (Japan) H Nishi	21	21
(Malaysia) Low H Y (Malaysia) Ng E C	13	15
2	(India) S Rankireddy (India) C Shetty	21	21

Second round
(Malaysia) Choong H J (Malaysia) M Haikal	21	21
(Japan) T Aizawa (Japan) D Sano	14	19
(Japan) K Kumagai (Japan) H Nishi	21	20	16
2	(India) S Rankireddy (India) C Shetty	10	22	21

Quarter-finals
(Malaysia) Choong H J (Malaysia) M Haikal	21	13	22
2	(India) S Rankireddy (India) C Shetty	14	21	20

== Women's doubles ==
=== Seeds ===
1. (India) Treesa Jolly / Gayatri Gopichand (first round)
2. (Chinese Taipei) Hsieh Pei-shan / Hung En-tzu (champions)
3. (Thailand) Benyapa Aimsaard / Nuntakarn Aimsaard (withdrew)
4. (Malaysia) Go Pei Kee / Teoh Mei Xing (second round)
5. (China) Chen Qingchen / Keng Shuliang (first round)
6. (Chinese Taipei) Hsu Ya-ching / Sung Yu-hsuan (second round)
7. (Japan) Kaho Osawa / Mai Tanabe (final)
8. (Indonesia) Meilysa Trias Puspita Sari / Rachel Allessya Rose (semi-finals)

=== Finals ===
Semi-finals
7	(Japan) Kaho Osawa (Japan) Mai Tanabe	21	21
(Chinese Taipei) Lin Chih-chun (Chinese Taipei) Lin Wan-ching	13	17
8	(Indonesia) Meilysa Trias Puspita Sari (Indonesia) Rachel Allessya Rose	19	21	17
2	(Chinese Taipei) Hsieh Pei-shan (Chinese Taipei) Hung En-tzu	21	18	21

Final
7	(Japan) Kaho Osawa (Japan) Mai Tanabe	18	12
2	(Chinese Taipei) Hsieh Pei-shan (Chinese Taipei) Hung En-tzu	21	21

=== Top half ===
==== Section 1 ====
First round
1	(India) T Jolly (India) G Gopichand	21	20	15
(Chinese Taipei) Lin X-m (Chinese Taipei) Peng Y-w	16	22	21
(Japan) Y Kato (Japan) H Osawa	19	13
(Japan) N Hara (Japan) R Kiyose	21	21
7	(Japan) K Osawa (Japan) M Tanabe	21	21
Q2	(Malaysia) Low Z Y (Malaysia) D Sofea	14	11
(Hong Kong) Fan K Y (Hong Kong) Yau M Y	16	19
(China) Wang YY (China) Wang ZM	21	21

Second round
(Chinese Taipei) Lin X-m (Chinese Taipei) Peng Y-w	21	21
(Japan) N Hara (Japan) R Kiyose	16	15
7	(Japan) K Osawa (Japan) M Tanabe	21	21
(China) Wang YY (China) Wang ZM	19	12

Quarter-finals
(Chinese Taipei) Lin X-m (Chinese Taipei) Peng Y-w	8	14
7	(Japan) K Osawa (Japan) M Tanabe	21	21

==== Section 2 ====
First round
4	(Malaysia) Go P K (Malaysia) Teoh M X	21	21
PFQ	(India) A Gahlawat (India) S Gahlawat	8	11
(Chinese Taipei) Lin C-c (Chinese Taipei) Lin W-c	14	21	21
Q4	(Chinese Taipei) Chen Y-h (Chinese Taipei) Liu C-y	21	15	14
6	(Chinese Taipei) Hsu Y-c (Chinese Taipei) Sung Y-h	15	21	21
(Chinese Taipei) Chen Y-f (Chinese Taipei) Sun L-c	21	13	9
(United States) L Lam (United States) A Lee	21	21
(Malaysia) Ong X Y (Malaysia) C Ting	13	11

Second round
4	(Malaysia) Go P K (Malaysia) Teoh M X	15	24	15
(Chinese Taipei) Lin C-c (Chinese Taipei) Lin W-c	21	22	21
6	(Chinese Taipei) Hsu Y-c (Chinese Taipei) Sung Y-h	21	19	19
(United States) L Lam (United States) A Lee	6	21	21

Quarter-finals
(Chinese Taipei) Lin C-c (Chinese Taipei) Lin W-c	22	21
(United States) L Lam (United States) A Lee	20	19

=== Bottom half ===
==== Section 3 ====
First round
(Thailand) T Kleebyeesun (Thailand) N Laisuan	21	21
(England) A Lado (England) E van Leeuwen	15	12
(Indonesia) A Rahayu (Indonesia) F Setianingrum	21	21
5	(China) Chen QC (China) Keng SL	13	19
(India) P Konjengbam (India) S Mishra	21	16	21
(Chinese Taipei) Huang Z-l (Chinese Taipei) Wang S-m	15	21	17
(Japan) R Hirokami (Japan) S Hobara	21	9	13
8	(Indonesia) M T Puspita Sari (Indonesia) R A Rose	17	21	21

Second round
(Thailand) T Kleebyeesun (Thailand) N Laisuan	12	15
(Indonesia) A Rahayu (Indonesia) F Setianingrum	21	21
(India) P Konjengbam (India) S Mishra	14	12
8	(Indonesia) M T Puspita Sari (Indonesia) R A Rose	21	21

Quarter-finals
(Indonesia) A Rahayu (Indonesia) F Setianingrum	15	21	18
8	(Indonesia) M T Puspita Sari (Indonesia) R A Rose	21	15	21

==== Section 4 ====
First round
(Thailand) O Jongsathapornparn (Thailand) S Suwachai	21	16	16
(China) Luo Y (China) Wang TG	17	21	21
(Macau) Ng W C (Macau) Pui C W	10	10
SWM	(Hong Kong) Lui L L (Hong Kong) Tsang H Y	21	21
(Chinese Taipei) Chen S-y (Chinese Taipei) Hsieh Y-e	13	16
Q3	(Malaysia) Cheng S H (Malaysia) Tan Z Y	21	21
Q1	(China) Ding KY (China) Shen SY	18	12
2	(Chinese Taipei) Hsieh P-s (Chinese Taipei) Hung E-t	21	21

Second round
(China) Luo Y (China) Wang TG	11	13
SWM	(Hong Kong) Lui L L (Hong Kong) Tsang H Y	21	21
Q3	(Malaysia) Cheng S H (Malaysia) Tan Z Y	17	17
2	(Chinese Taipei) Hsieh P-s (Chinese Taipei) Hung E-t	21	21

Quarter-finals
SWM	(Hong Kong) Lui L L (Hong Kong) Tsang H Y	21	24	15
2	(Chinese Taipei) Hsieh P-s (Chinese Taipei) Hung E-t	19	26	21

== Mixed doubles ==
=== Seeds ===
1. (Malaysia) Chen Tang Jie / Toh Ee Wei (semi-finals)
2. (China) Cheng Xing / Zhang Chi (quarter-finals)
3. (Malaysia) Hoo Pang Ron / Cheng Su Yin (second round)
4. (Indonesia) Rehan Naufal Kusharjanto / Gloria Emanuelle Widjaja (quarter-finals)
5. (India) Dhruv Kapila / Tanisha Crasto (second round)
6. (Indonesia) Amri Syahnawi / Nita Violina Marwah (semi-finals)
7. (Singapore) Terry Hee / Jin Yujia (first round)
8. (Indonesia) Adnan Maulana / Indah Cahya Sari Jamil (quarter-finals)

=== Finals ===
Semi-finals
1	(Malaysia) Chen Tang Jie (Malaysia) Toh Ee Wei	21	17	11
Q1	(Denmark) Mathias Christiansen (Denmark) Alexandra Bøje	15	21	21
6	(Indonesia) Amri Syahnawi (Indonesia) Nita Violina Marwah	18	16
(Malaysia) Jimmy Wong (Malaysia) Lai Pei Jing	21	21

Final
Q1	(Denmark) Mathias Christiansen (Denmark) Alexandra Bøje	21	21
(Malaysia) Jimmy Wong (Malaysia) Lai Pei Jing	13	16

=== Top half ===
==== Section 1 ====
First round
1	(Malaysia) Chen T J (Malaysia) Toh E W	21	21
(Macau) Leong I C (Macau) Ng W C	11	11
(China) Li HY (China) Huang KX	21	21
(England) C Hemming (England) E van Leeuwen	8	11
8	(Indonesia) A Maulana (Indonesia) I C S Jamil	20	21	21
(Indonesia) R Rivaldy (Indonesia) P H Mentari	22	18	10
(Thailand) P Horbanluekit (Thailand) F Korpthammakit	21	21
Q2	(India) H N B Thandrangi (India) P Konjengbam	11	14

Second round
1	(Malaysia) Chen T J (Malaysia) Toh E W	21	21
(China) Li HY (China) Huang KX	18	13
8	(Indonesia) A Maulana (Indonesia) I C S Jamil	21	21
(Thailand) P Horbanluekit (Thailand) F Korpthammakit	10	8

Quarter-finals
1	(Malaysia) Chen T J (Malaysia) Toh E W	21	22
8	(Indonesia) A Maulana (Indonesia) I C S Jamil	17	20

==== Section 2 ====
First round
3	(Malaysia) Hoo P R (Malaysia) Cheng S Y	21	16	21
(Indonesia) B Setiabudi (Indonesia) M D Oktavianti	14	21	17
Q1	(Denmark) M Christiansen (Denmark) A Bøje	21	14	21
(South Korea) Lee J-m (South Korea) Chae Y-j	14	21	14
7	(Singapore) T Hee (Singapore) Jin YJ	24	12	17
(Japan) Y Watanabe (Japan) H Osawa	22	21	21
(China) Gao JX (China) Wu MY	21	21
(Malaysia) Liew X (Malaysia) Ho L E	7	14

Second round
3	(Malaysia) Hoo P R (Malaysia) Cheng S Y	16	16
Q1	(Denmark) M Christiansen (Denmark) A Bøje	21	21
(Japan) Y Watanabe (Japan) H Osawa	21	21
(China) Gao JX (China) Wu MY	15	18

Quarter-finals
Q1	(Denmark) M Christiansen (Denmark) A Bøje	w	/	o
(Japan) Y Watanabe (Japan) H Osawa

=== Bottom half ===
==== Section 3 ====
First round
Q4	(Malaysia) Wee Y H (Malaysia) Chan W T	21	15	19
(Malaysia) Loo B K (Malaysia) Go P K	13	21	21
(India) S Karunakaran (India) A Variyath	18	21
6	(Indonesia) A Syahnawi (Indonesia) N V Marwah	21	23
Q3	(Hong Kong) Lee C H (Hong Kong) Yau M Y	14	17
(Chinese Taipei) Lu M-c (Chinese Taipei) Hung E-t	21	21
(India) A Agarwal (India) S Mishra	10	11
4	(Indonesia) R N Kusharjanto (Indonesia) G E Widjaja	21	21

Second round
(Malaysia) Loo B K (Malaysia) Go P K	9	22	11
6	(Indonesia) A Syahnawi (Indonesia) N V Marwah	21	20	21
(Chinese Taipei) Lu M-c (Chinese Taipei) Hung E-t	17	14
4	(Indonesia) R N Kusharjanto (Indonesia) G E Widjaja	21	21

Quarter-finals
6	(Indonesia) A Syahnawi (Indonesia) N V Marwah	21	7
4	(Indonesia) R N Kusharjanto (Indonesia) G E Widjaja	15	1^{r}

==== Section 4 ====
First round
(Hong Kong) Hung K C (Hong Kong) Tsang H Y	15	11
(Malaysia) J Wong (Malaysia) Lai P J	21	21
(Thailand) R Makkasasithorn (Thailand) N Laisuan	10	15
5	(India) D Kapila (India) T Crasto	21	21
(Chinese Taipei) Wu G-x (Chinese Taipei) Lee C-h	22	21
(India) R Kapoor (India) R Gadde	20	17
(Malaysia) Wong T C (Malaysia) Lim C S	21	11	19
2	(China) Cheng X (China) Zhang C	18	21	21

Second round
(Malaysia) J Wong (Malaysia) Lai P J	19	21	21
5	(India) D Kapila (India) T Crasto	21	13	18
(Chinese Taipei) Wu G-x (Chinese Taipei) Lee C-h	9	22	10
2	(China) Cheng X (China) Zhang C	21	20	21

Quarter-finals
(Malaysia) J Wong (Malaysia) Lai P J	21	17	21
2	(China) Cheng X (China) Zhang C	12	21	18

Preceded by 2025 China Open	BWF World Tour; 2025 BWF season	Succeeded by 2025 Baoji China Masters
