= Nantes International =

Internatiol badminton tournament

The Nantes International is an international badminton tournament held in Nantes, France. The event is part of the Badminton World Federation's International Challenge and part of the Badminton Europe Elite Circuit. It was held for the first time in 2022.

== Previous winners ==
Year	Men's singles	Women's singles	Men's doubles	Women's doubles	Mixed doubles
2022	(Denmark) Mads Christophersen	(Chinese Taipei) Hsu Wen-chi	(Chinese Taipei) Su Ching-heng (Chinese Taipei) Ye Hong-wei	(Denmark) Julie Finne-Ipsen (Denmark) Mai Surrow	(Indonesia) Amri Syahnawi (Indonesia) Winny Oktavina Kandow
2023	(France) Arnaud Merklé	(Indonesia) Komang Ayu Cahya Dewi	(Malaysia) Junaidi Arif (Malaysia) Yap Roy King	(India) Tanisha Crasto (India) Ashwini Ponnappa	(Denmark) Mads Vestergaard (Denmark) Christine Busch
2024	(France) Alex Lanier	(Denmark) Line Christophersen	(Denmark) Andreas Søndergaard (Denmark) Jesper Toft	(England) Chloe Birch (England) Estelle van Leeuwen	(Denmark) Jesper Toft (Denmark) Amalie Magelund
2025	No competition				

== Performances by nation ==
As of the 2024 edition

No	Nation	MS	WS	MD	WD	XD	Total
1	Denmark	1	1	1	1	2	6
2	Chinese Taipei	0	1	1	0	0	2
2	France	2	0	0	0	0	2
2	Indonesia	0	1	0	0	1	2
5	England	0	0	0	1	0	1
5	India	0	0	0	1	0	1
5	Malaysia	0	0	1	0	0	1
Total		3	3	3	3	3	15
