= Adnan Maulana =

Indonesian badminton player (born 1999)

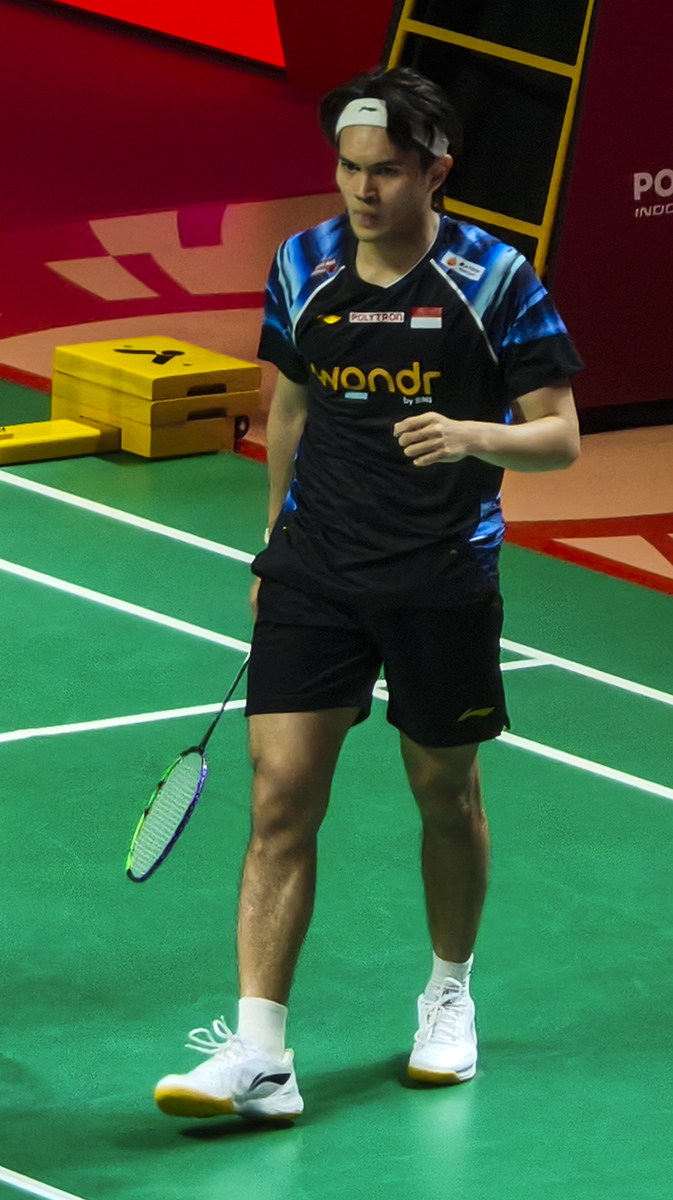
- Maulana at the 2026 Indonesia Open

Personal information
- Born: 23 October 1999 (age 27) Jambi, Indonesia
- Height: 1.73 m (5 ft 8 in)

Sport
- Country: Indonesia
- Sport: Badminton
- Handedness: Right

Men's & mixed doubles
- Highest ranking: 143 (MD with Ghifari Anandaffa Prihardika, 23 April 2019); 17 (XD with Indah Cahya Sari Jamil, 12 May 2026); 27 (XD with Mychelle Crhystine Bandaso, 9 August 2022); 38 (XD with Nita Violina Marwah, 6 June 2023)
- Current ranking: 37 (XD with Indah Cahya Sari Jamil, 27 October 2026)
- BWF profile
Medal record
Men's badminton
Representing Indonesia
SEA Games
Bronze medal – third place	2021 Vietnam	Men's team
Bronze medal – third place	2021 Vietnam	Mixed doubles
Asian Junior Championships
Silver medal – second place	2017 Jakarta	Mixed team

Adnan Maulana (born 23 October 1999) is an Indonesian badminton player affiliated with Jaya Raya Jakarta club. He won a bronze medal in the mixed doubles at the 2021 SEA Games partnered with Mychelle Crhystine Bandaso.

== Career ==
In 2019, Maulana won his first senior international title at the 2019 Iran Fajr International in the men's doubles event partnering Ghifari Anandaffa Prihardika. He then won his World Tour title at the Russian Open in the mixed doubles with Mychelle Crhystine Bandaso. He and Bandaso beating host pair Evgenij Dremin and Evgenia Dimova in the final in straight games. Maulana and Bandaso also finished as runners-up at the World Tour Super 100 in Hyderabad and Indonesia.

In 2022, Maulana competed with new partner Indah Cahya Sari Jamil and reached the finals of Indonesia International.

=== 2023 ===
In February, Maulana started the season with new partner Nita Violina Marwah playing in mixed doubles, and reach the semi-finals of Iran Fajr International.

In March, Maulana and Marwah reached the finals of Thailand International. In the end of March, they competed in the European tour at the Spain Masters, but had to lose in the second round from Danish pair Mathias Thyrri and Amalie Magelund. In the next tour, they lost in the semi-finals of Orléans Masters in France from Chinese Taipei pair Ye Hong-wei and Lee Chia-hsin.

In May, Maulana alongside the Indonesian team competed at the 2023 Sudirman Cup in Suzhou, China. He played a match in the group stage, won against Adam Dong and Josephine Wu of Canada. Indonesia advanced to the knockout stage but lost at the quarterfinals against China. In the next tournament, they lost in qualifying rounds of Malaysia Masters from Malaysian pair Chan Peng Soon and Cheah Yee See. In the next tour, they competed in the Thailand Open, but lost in the second round from 1st seed and eventual finalist Thai pair Dechapol Puavaranukroh and Sapsiree Taerattanachai.

In June, Maulana and Marwah competed at the home tournament, Indonesia Open, but lost in the first round from 1st seed CHinese player Zheng Siwei and Huang Yaqiong. In the next tour, they competed in the Taipei Open, but lost in the first round from Thai pair Ruttanapak Oupthong and Jhenicha Sudjaipraparat.

In early August, Maulana and Marwah competed at the Australian Open, but had to lose in the second round from 2nd seed Chinese pair Feng Yanzhe and Huang Dongping in straight games.

== Achievements ==
=== SEA Games ===
Mixed doubles
Year	Venue	Partner	Opponent	Score	Result	Ref.
2021	Bac Giang Gymnasium; Bắc Giang, Vietnam	(Indonesia) Mychelle Crhystine Bandaso	(Malaysia) Hoo Pang Ron (Malaysia) Cheah Yee See	21–18, 16–21, 17–21	Bronze	

=== BWF World Tour (3 titles, 3 runners-up) ===
The BWF World Tour, which was announced on 19 March 2017 and implemented in 2018, is a series of elite badminton tournaments sanctioned by the Badminton World Federation (BWF). The BWF World Tour is divided into levels of World Tour Finals, Super 1000, Super 750, Super 500, Super 300 (part of the HSBC World Tour), and the BWF Tour Super 100.

Mixed doubles
Year	Tournament	Level	Partner	Opponent	Score	Result	Ref.
2019	Russian Open	Super 100	(Indonesia) Mychelle Crhystine Bandaso	(Russia) Evgenij Dremin (Russia) Evgenia Dimova	19–21, 21–13, 21–15	(gold) Winner	
2019	Hyderabad Open	Super 100	(Indonesia) Mychelle Crhystine Bandaso	(Malaysia) Hoo Pang Ron (Malaysia) Cheah Yee See	21–16, 16–21, 11–21	(silver) Runner-up	
2019	Indonesia Masters	Super 100	(Indonesia) Mychelle Crhystine Bandaso	(China) Guo Xinwa (China) Zhang Shuxian	18–21, 21–16, 26–28	(silver) Runner-up	
2024 (I)	Indonesia Masters	Super 100	(Indonesia) Indah Cahya Sari Jamil	(Indonesia) Jafar Hidayatullah (Indonesia) Felisha Pasaribu	11–21, 19–21	(silver) Runner-up	
2024	Vietnam Open	Super 100	(Indonesia) Indah Cahya Sari Jamil	(Indonesia) Zaidan Arrafi Awal Nabawi (Indonesia) Jessica Maya Rismawardani	21–15, 21–15	(gold) Winner	
2026	Thailand Masters	Super 300	(Indonesia) Indah Cahya Sari Jamil	(Indonesia) Bobby Setiabudi (Indonesia) Melati Daeva Oktavianti	18–21, 21–19, 21–17	(gold) Winner	

=== BWF International Challenge/Series (1 title, 6 runners-up) ===
Men's doubles
Year	Tournament	Partner	Opponent	Score	Result	Ref.
2019	Iran Fajr International	(Indonesia) Ghifari Anandaffa Prihardika	(Indonesia) Pramudya Kusumawardana (Indonesia) Yeremia Rambitan	21–18, 21–13	(gold) Winner	

Mixed doubles
Year	Tournament	Partner	Opponent	Score	Result	Ref.
2018	Singapore International	(Indonesia) Masita Mahmudin	(Hong Kong) Yeung Ming Nok (Hong Kong) Ng Tsz Yau	21–19, 7–21, 18–21	(silver) Runner-up	
2018	Indonesia International	(Indonesia) Shella Devi Aulia	(Japan) Kohei Gondo (Japan) Ayane Kurihara	17–21, 21–23	(silver) Runner-up	
2022 (I)	Indonesia International	(Indonesia) Indah Cahya Sari Jamil	(Indonesia) Akbar Bintang Cahyono (Indonesia) Marsheilla Gischa Islami	17–21, 21–14, 16–21	(silver) Runner-up	
2023	Thailand International	(Indonesia) Nita Violina Marwah	(Thailand) Ruttanapak Oupthong (Thailand) Jhenicha Sudjaipraparat	13–21, 19–21	(silver) Runner-up	
2024 (I)	Indonesia International	(Indonesia) Indah Cahya Sari Jamil	(Indonesia) Jafar Hidayatullah (Indonesia) Felisha Pasaribu	18–21, 10–21	(silver) Runner-up	
2024	Malaysia International	(Indonesia) Indah Cahya Sari Jamil	(Indonesia) Amri Syahnawi (Indonesia) Nita Violina Marwah	24–22, 11–21, 19–21	(silver) Runner-up	

BWF International Challenge tournament
BWF International Series tournament

== Performance timeline ==
Key

W	Won	F	Finalist	SF	Semi-finalist
QF	Quarter-finalist	#R	Rounds 4, 3, 2, 1	RR	Round-robin stage
Q#	Qualification round	A	Absent	w/d	Withdrew
G	Gold	S	Silver	B	Bronze
NH	Not held	N/A	Not applicable	DNQ	Did not qualify

=== National team ===
- Junior level

Team events	2017
Asia Junior Championships	S
World Junior Championships	QF

- Senior level

Team events	2021	2022	2023	Ref
SEA Games	B	NH	A	
Sudirman Cup	A	NH	QF	

=== Individual competitions ===
==== Junior level ====
- Boys' doubles

Event	2017
World Junior Championships	4R

==== Senior level ====
===== Men's doubles =====
Tournament	BWF World Tour	Best
Tournament	2018	Best
Indonesia Masters Super 100	1R	1R ('18)
Year-end ranking	370	143

===== Mixed doubles =====
Event	2021	2022	2023	2024	2025	2026	Ref
SEA Games	B	NH	A	NH	A	NH	
Asian Championships	NH	2R	A	1R	A	1R	
World Championships	A	A	DNQ	NH	DNQ	Dec	

Tournament	BWF World Tour									Best	Ref
Tournament	2018	2019	2020	2021	2022	2023	2024	2025	2026	Best	Ref
Indonesia Masters	A		1R	2R	1R	A	1R	1R	QF	QF ('26)	
Thailand Masters	A		QF	NH		A	1R	QF	W	W ('26)	
German Open	A		NH		QF	A		1R	A	QF ('22)	
All England Open	A		1R	A	1R	A				1R ('20, '22)	
Lingshui China Masters	A	2R	NH			A				2R ('19)	
Swiss Open	A		NH	1R	2R	A	1R	A	QF	QF ('26)	
Orléans Masters	A		NH	A		SF	A	QF	1R	SF ('23)	
Thailand Open	A		1R	NH	A	2R	2R	QF.	1R	QF ('25)	
Thailand Open	A		2R	NH	A	2R	2R	QF.	1R	QF ('25)	
Malaysia Masters	A			NH	A	Q1	1R	1R	2R	2R ('26)	
Indonesia Open	A		NH	2R	A	1R	2R	QF	2R	QF ('25)	
Australian Open	A		NH		QF	2R	A	2R	A	QF ('22)	
Macau Open	A	2R	NH				A	QF	A	QF ('25)	
Taipei Open	A	2R	NH		A	1R	A	1R	A	2R ('19)	
Korea Masters	A		NH		1R	2R	A			2R ('23)	
China Masters	A		NH			A		1R	A	1R ('25)	
Indonesia Masters Super 100	1R	F	NH		2R	A	F	A		F ('19, '24^{I})	
Indonesia Masters Super 100	1R	F	NH		2R	A	2R	A		F ('19, '24^{I})	
Vietnam Open	A	2R	NH		A		W	A		W ('24)	
Denmark Open	A			1R	A			2R	A	2R ('25)	
French Open	A		NH	A				1R	A	1R ('25)	
Hylo Open	A			2R	A			2R		2R ('21, '25)	
Korea Open	A		NH		QF	A		1R		QF ('22)	
Hong Kong Open	A		NH			2R	A	SF		SF ('25)	
Guwahati Masters	NH					2R	A			2R ('23)	
Odisha Masters	NH				A	SF	A			SF ('23)	
Hyderabad Open	A	F	NH							F ('19)	
Russian Open	A	W	NH							W ('19)	
Spain Masters	A				NH	2R	2R	NH		2R ('23', '24)	
Year-end ranking	309	42	33	30	50	38	65	25		18	
Tournament	2018	2019	2020	2021	2022	2023	2024	2025	2026	Best	Ref
