= Supanida Katethong =

Thai badminton player (born 1997)

Personal information
- Nickname: May
- Born: 26 October 1997 (age 29) Bangkok, Thailand
- Height: 1.63 m (5 ft 4 in)

Sport
- Country: Thailand
- Sport: Badminton
- Handedness: Left

Women's singles
- Highest ranking: 6 (21 January 2025)
- Current ranking: 27 (10 November 2026)
- BWF profile
Medal record
Women's badminton
Representing Thailand
Uber Cup
Bronze medal – third place	2020 Aarhus	Women's team
Bronze medal – third place	2022 Bangkok	Women's team
Asian Games
Bronze medal – third place	2022 Hangzhou	Women's team
Asia Mixed Team Championships
Bronze medal – third place	2023 Dubai	Mixed team
Asia Team Championships
Silver medal – second place	2024 Selangor	Women's team
Bronze medal – third place	2020 Manila	Women's team
SEA Games
Gold medal – first place	2021 Vietnam	Women's team
Gold medal – first place	2023 Cambodia	Women's singles
Gold medal – first place	2023 Cambodia	Women's team
Gold medal – first place	2025 Thailand	Women's team
Silver medal – second place	2025 Thailand	Women's singles

Supanida Katethong (Thai: ศุภนิดา เกตุทอง; born 26 October 1997) is a Thai badminton player. She won the gold medal in the women's singles at the 2023 SEA Games, and also part of Thai winning team at the Games in 2021 and 2023. She is nicknamed as May Sai (Thai: เมย์ซ้าย, lit. 'left May'), so as to not only avoid confusion with another May, which is Ratchanok "May" Intanon, but to also reference her left-handedness.

Supanida also competed for Thailand at the 2024 Summer Olympics.

== Career ==
Supanida started playing badminton at age nine and joined the Thailand national junior team in 2015. She won her first international title at the 2014 Singapore International tournament in the women's singles event. In the early of 2015, she won the women's singles title at the Granular Thailand International Challenge tournament. In May 2015, she won double titles at the Smiling Fish International tournament in the women's singles and doubles event. She also won the Sri Lanka International tournament in the women's singles event.

In 2018, Supanida finished runners-up in the Indonesia International and Spanish International. She then claimed two titles in 2019 in the Iran Fajr International and Mongolia International.

Supanida reached her first final in the BWF World Tour at the India Open, losing to her compatriot Busanan Ongbamrungphan.

=== 2023–2025 ===
Supanida opened the 2023 season as a semi-finalist in the India Open, losing to the then world number 1 Akane Yamaguchi. She also reached the semi-finals in the Thailand Masters. In May, Katethong competed at the SEA Games in Cambodia, and won the gold medals in the women's singles and team events. On 16 July, she won her first BWF World Tour title at the 2023 U.S. Open after defeating Gao Fangjie in two straight games. In the next two tournaments, she was defeated by her compatriot Ratchanok Intanon in the second round of the Japan Open, and in the quarter-finals of the Australian Open.

In 2024, Supanida reached three finals, where she won the Thailand Open, and also became finalists in the Thailand and Spain Masters.

In December 2025, Supanida participated in the SEA Games, where she helps the team won the gold medal. She also won the silver medal in the women's singles, losing to her compatriot, Ratchanok in the final.

=== 2026 ===
In March, Supanida won her first World Tour after two years where she beat Putri Kusuma Wardani in two straight games in the final of the Swiss Open.

== Achievements ==
=== SEA Games ===
Women's singles
Year	Venue	Opponent	Score	Result	Ref.
2023	Morodok Techo Badminton Hall; Phnom Penh, Cambodia	(Thailand) Lalinrat Chaiwan	21–12, 21–14	Gold	
2025	Gymnasium 4, Thammasat University Rangsit Campus; Pathum Thani, Thailand	(Thailand) Ratchanok Intanon	19–21, 7–21	Silver	

=== BWF World Tour (3 titles, 3 runners-up) ===
The BWF World Tour, which was announced on 19 March 2017 and implemented in 2018, is a series of elite badminton tournaments sanctioned by the Badminton World Federation (BWF). The BWF World Tour is divided into levels of World Tour Finals, Super 1000, Super 750, Super 500, Super 300, and the BWF Tour Super 100.

Women's singles
Year	Tournament	Level	Opponent	Score	Result	Ref.
2022	India Open	Super 500	(Thailand) Busanan Ongbamrungphan	20–22, 21–19, 13–21	(silver) Runner-up	
2023	U.S. Open	Super 300	(China) Gao Fangjie	21–15, 21–16	(gold) Winner	
2024	Thailand Masters	Super 300	(Japan) Aya Ohori	21–18, 17–21, 13–21	(silver) Runner-up	
2024	Spain Masters	Super 300	(Thailand) Ratchanok Intanon	12–21, 9–21	(silver) Runner-up	
2024	Thailand Open	Super 500	(China) Han Yue	21–16, 25–23	(gold) Winner	
2026	Swiss Open	Super 300	(Indonesia) Putri Kusuma Wardani	21–11, 21–15	(gold) Winner	

=== BWF International Challenge/Series (7 titles, 2 runners-up) ===
Women's singles
Year	Tournament	Opponent	Score	Result	Ref.
2014	Singapore International	(Indonesia) Millicent Wiranto	21–11, 22–20	(gold) Winner	
2015	Thailand International	(South Korea) Kim Hyo-min	21–16, 21–16	(gold) Winner	
2015	Smiling Fish International	(Thailand) Sarita Suwannakitborihan	21–14, 21–17	(gold) Winner	
2015	Sri Lanka International	(Switzerland) Sabrina Jaquet	17–21, 21–11, 12–6 retired	(gold) Winner	
2018	Indonesia International	(Indonesia) Aurum Oktavia Winata	19–21, 16–21	(silver) Runner-up	
2018	Spanish International	(Denmark) Michelle Skødstrup	11–21, 15–21	(silver) Runner-up	
2019	Iran Fajr International	(Indonesia) Choirunnisa	21–16, 21–13	(gold) Winner	
2019	Mongolia International	(South Korea) Sim Yu-jin	21–19, 19–21, 21–9	(gold) Winner	

Women's doubles
Year	Tournament	Partner	Opponent	Score	Result	Ref.
2015	Smiling Fish International	(Thailand) Panjarat Pransopon	(Thailand) Thidarat Kleebyeesoon (Thailand) Ruethaichanok Laisuan	21–13, 21–8	(gold) Winner	

BWF International Challenge tournament
BWF International Series tournament
