= Yap Roy King =

Malaysian badminton player (born 2001)

Yap Roy King 叶睿庆
Personal information
- Born: 10 February 2001 (age 25) Johor, Malaysia
- Years active: 2015–present
- Height: 1.80 m (5 ft 11 in)

Sport
- Country: Malaysia
- Sport: Badminton
- Handedness: Right
- Coached by: Herry Iman Pierngadi; Nova Widianto

Men's & mixed doubles
- Highest ranking: 16 (MD with Junaidi Arif, 10 March 2026); 43 (XD with Valeree Siow, 30 July 2024)
- Current ranking: 25 (MD with Junaidi Arif); 55 (MD with Aaron Tai); 84 (MD with Tee Kai Wun) (3 November 2026)
- BWF profile
Medal record
Men's badminton
Representing Malaysia
SEA Games
Silver medal – second place	2023 Cambodia	Mixed doubles
Silver medal – second place	2023 Cambodia	Men's team

Yap Roy King (Chinese: 叶睿庆; pinyin: Yè Ruìqìng, born 10 February 2001) is a Malaysian badminton player who competes in men's and mixed doubles. A BWF World Tour Super 500 champion, three-time men's doubles World Tour title winner and double silver medalist at the 2023 SEA Games, he won the men's doubles titles at the 2025 Macau Open with Junaidi Arif, 2026 Korea Masters with Tee Kai Wun and 2026 Arctic Open with Aaron Tai. His victory at the Arctic Open marked his first Super 500 title, achieved in his first tournament alongside Tai.

At the 2023 SEA Games, Yap won silver medals in the men's team event and mixed doubles, partnering Cheng Su Yin in the latter. He also won the mixed doubles title at the 2023 Indonesia Masters Super 100 with Valeree Siow and finished runners-up in men's doubles at the 2024 Spain Masters with Junaidi Arif. Together with Arif, he secured his first BWF World Tour men's doubles title at the 2025 Macau Open, defeating Indonesia's Sabar Karyaman Gutama and Muhammad Reza Pahlevi Isfahani in the final. Following changes to Malaysia's men's doubles partnerships in 2026, Yap won the Korea Masters alongside Tee Kai Wun before capturing the Arctic Open with Aaron Tai. At the latter tournament, they defeated Chinese Taipei's Lai Po-yu and Tsai Fu-cheng 21–19, 21–19 in the final, winning their first title together without dropping a game throughout the competition.

== Career ==
Yap made his international debut at the Jakarta Open Junior International U-15 in 2015.

=== 2019 ===
In August, he won his first international tournament at the Malaysia Junior International, partnering Ooi Jhy Dar in men's doubles and Gan Jing Err in mixed doubles. In the following week, he and Ooi won their second title in two weeks at the India Junior International.

In October, Yap competed at the 2019 World Junior Championships. He and Gan reached the mixed doubles event quarter-finals but lost to Thailand's Ratchapol Makkasasithorn and Benyapa Aimsaard.

=== 2021 ===
In August, Yap won two titles at the Latvia International together with Muhammad Nurfirdaus Azman in men's doubles and Valeree Siow in mixed doubles.

In the following month, he and Siow won another two more titles back-to-back, the Hellas International and the Ukraine International.

=== 2023 ===
In May, Yap made his debut at the 2023 SEA Games where he helped Malaysia win a silver medal in the men's team event. He later partnered with Cheng Su Yin in the mixed doubles event and went on to win silver, falling to Indonesia's Rehan Naufal Kusharjanto and Lisa Ayu Kusumawati in the final.

In June, he captured the Nantes International men's doubles title partnered with Junaidi Arif.

In July, he was crowned double national champion after winning the 2023 National Championships men's doubles event with Arif and the mixed doubles event with Siow.

In September, Yap and Siow entered the final of Indonesia Masters I. They successfully captured the mixed doubles title after defeating Japan's Hiroki Nishi and Akari Sato in three games.

=== 2024 ===
In late March, playing only their second tournament of the year after an injury layoff, Yap and Arif advanced to the Spain Masters final. They fell to Sabar Karyaman Gutama and Muhammad Reza Pahlevi Isfahani in three games, finishing as runners-up.

=== 2025 ===
In July, right before the upcoming 2025 BWF World Championships, Yap and Arif won their maiden title in men's doubles at Macau Open against Sabar and Reza, on a slippery court and with a tremendous delay in between during matches.

=== 2026 ===
Because of the BAM pair reshuffle, Yap would be paired with Tee Kai Wun. This pair was working as they won the Korea Masters in an All-Malaysian final against Man Wei Chong and Soh Wooi Yik. Two months later, Yap won another title at the Arctic Open, defeating the Taiwanese pair of Lai Po-yu and Tsai Fu-cheng in straight games with another partner, Aaron Tai. In November, Yap and Aaron continued their good form and becoming the first Malaysian men's doubles pair to win the Japan Masters by beating the home favourite, Takuro Hoki and Yugo Kobayashi in three games.

== Achievements ==
=== Southeast Asian Games ===
Mixed doubles
Year	Venue	Partner	Opponent	Score	Result	Ref.
2023	Morodok Techo Badminton Hall; Phnom Penh, Cambodia	(Malaysia) Cheng Su Yin	(Indonesia) Rehan Naufal Kusharjanto (Indonesia) Lisa Ayu Kusumawati	22–20, 8–21, 16–21	Silver	

=== BWF World Tour (5 titles, 1 runner-up) ===
The BWF World Tour, which was announced on 19 March 2017 and implemented in 2018, is a series of elite badminton tournaments sanctioned by the Badminton World Federation (BWF). The BWF World Tours are divided into levels of World Tour Finals, Super 1000, Super 750, Super 500, Super 300, and the BWF Tour Super 100.

Men's doubles
Year	Tournament	Level	Partner	Opponent	Score	Result	Ref.
2024	Spain Masters	Super 300	(Malaysia) Junaidi Arif	(Indonesia) Sabar Karyaman Gutama (Indonesia) Muhammad Reza Pahlevi Isfahani	18–21, 21–17, 19–21	(silver) Runner-up	
2025	Macau Open	Super 300	(Malaysia) Junaidi Arif	(Indonesia) Sabar Karyaman Gutama (Indonesia) Muhammad Reza Pahlevi Isfahani	22–20, 21–18	(gold) Winner	
2026	Korea Masters	Super 300	(Malaysia) Tee Kai Wun	(Malaysia) Man Wei Chong (Malaysia) Soh Wooi Yik	21–13, 21–18	(gold) Winner	
2026	Arctic Open	Super 500	(Malaysia) Aaron Tai	(Chinese Taipei) Lai Po-yu (Chinese Taipei) Tsai Fu-cheng	21–19, 21–19	(gold) Winner	
2026	Japan Masters	Super 500	(Malaysia) Aaron Tai	(Japan) Takuro Hoki (Japan) Yugo Kobayashi	16–21, 21–13, 21–15	(gold) Winner	

Mixed doubles
Year	Tournament	Level	Partner	Opponent	Score	Result	Ref.
2023 (I)	Indonesia Masters	Super 100	(Malaysia) Valeree Siow	(Japan) Hiroki Nishi (Japan) Akari Sato	13–21, 21–14, 21–14	(gold) Winner	

=== BWF International Challenge/Series (5 titles) ===
Men's doubles
Year	Tournament	Partner	Opponent	Score	Result
2021	Latvia International	(Malaysia) Muhammad Nurfirdaus Azman	(Malaysia) Junaidi Arif (Malaysia) Muhammad Haikal	21–23, 21–15, 21–19	(gold) Winner
2023	Nantes International	(Malaysia) Junaidi Arif	(Indonesia) Putra Erwiansyah (Indonesia) Patra Harapan Rindorindo	21–16, 14–21, 21–12	(gold) Winner

Mixed doubles
Year	Tournament	Partner	Opponent	Score	Result
2021	Latvia International	(Malaysia) Valeree Siow	(Malaysia) Muhammad Nurfirdaus Azman (Malaysia) Low Yeen Yuan	22–20, 21–15	(gold) Winner
2021	Hellas International	(Malaysia) Valeree Siow	(Norway) Carl Christian Mork (Norway) Solvår Flåten Joergensen	21–13, 21–17	(gold) Winner
2021	Ukraine Open	(Malaysia) Valeree Siow	(Germany) Johannes Pistorius (Germany) Emma Moszczynski	21–19, 21–12	(gold) Winner

BWF International Challenge tournament
BWF International Series tournament
BWF Future Series tournament

=== BWF Junior International (3 titles) ===
Boys' doubles
Year	Tournament	Partner	Opponent	Score	Result
2019	Malaysia Junior International	(Malaysia) Ooi Jhy Dar	(Malaysia) Justin Hoh (Malaysia) Fazriq Razif	21–14, 21–14	(gold) Winner
2019	India Junior International	(Malaysia) Ooi Jhy Dar	(Japan) Takuma Kawamoto (Japan) Tsubasa Kawamura	17–21, 21–16, 23–21	(gold) Winner

Mixed doubles
Year	Tournament	Partner	Opponent	Score	Result
2019	Malaysia Junior International	(Malaysia) Gan Jing Err	(Indonesia) Ghana Muhammad Al Ilham (Indonesia) Berliona Alma Pradisa	21–11, 21–12	(gold) Winner

BWF Junior International Grand Prix tournament
BWF Junior International Challenge tournament
BWF Junior International Series tournament
BWF Junior Future Series tournament
