= Junaidi Arif =

Malaysian badminton player (born 2002)

Personal information
- Born: Wan Muhammad Arif Shaharuddin bin Wan Junaidi; 6 June 2002 (age 24) Kemaman, Terengganu, Malaysia
- Height: 1.62 m (5 ft 4 in)

Sport
- Country: Malaysia
- Sport: Badminton
- Handedness: Left
- Coached by: Herry Iman Pierngadi

Men's doubles
- Highest ranking: 16 (with Yap Roy King, 10 March 2026); 38 (with Muhammad Haikal, 6 December 2022)
- Current ranking: 25 (with Yap Roy King, 3 November 2026)
- BWF profile
Medal record
Men's badminton
Representing Malaysia
SEA Games
Silver medal – second place	2021 Vietnam	Men's team

Wan Muhammad Arif Shaharuddin bin Wan Junaidi (born 6 June 2002), commonly known as Junaidi Arif, is a Malaysian badminton player. A BWF World Tour Super 300 tournament champion and SEA Games silver medalist, he won the men's doubles title at the 2025 Macau Open with his partner Yap Roy King, defeating Indonesia's Sabar Karyaman Gutama and Muhammad Reza Pahlevi Isfahani in the final. It was their first BWF World Tour title together, following their runner-up finish at the 2024 Spain Masters.

Junaidi was part of the Malaysian men's team that won a silver medal at the 2021 SEA Games, held in 2022. Earlier in his career, he won the men's doubles titles at the 2021 Austrian Open and Ukraine International alongside Muhammad Haikal. After forming a partnership with Yap Roy King, the pair won the 2023 Nantes International and the Malaysian national men's doubles championship. They later reached their first BWF World Tour final at the 2024 Spain Masters before capturing the 2025 Macau Open crown, defeating the same Indonesian pair that had beaten them in the Spain Masters final.

== Career ==
=== 2021 ===
Partnered with Muhammad Haikal, they won the Austrian Open, Hellas International, and Ukraine International. The duo also finished as runners-up at the Latvia International and Scottish Open.

=== 2022 ===
In April, Arif and Haikal reached the final of the Orléans Masters. However, they were forced to concede a walkover to Dutch pair Ruben Jille and Ties van der Lecq after Haikal was tested positive for COVID-19.

He was part of the Malaysia's men's team that won silver medal at the 2021 SEA Games in May.

A few months later, he and Haikal reached the quarter-finals of the Malaysia Masters.

=== 2023 ===
Following a reshuffle in the national men's doubles department in February, Arif began partnering Yap Roy King, thus ending his long-time partnership with Haikal.

In June, Arif and Yap captured their first title as a pair at the Nantes International defeating Putra Erwiansyah and Patra Harapan Rindorindo in the final.

In July, they were crowned as men's doubles national champions after winning the 2023 National Championships.

=== 2024 ===
In late March, playing in only their second tournament of the year after an injury layoff, Arif and Yap advanced to the Spain Masters final. They fell to Sabar Karyaman Gutama and Muhammad Reza Pahlevi Isfahani in three games, finishing as runners-up.

=== 2025 ===
In July right before the upcoming 2025 BWF World Championships, Arif and Yap won their maiden title in men's doubles at Macau Open against Sabar and Reza, on a slippery court and having tremendous delay in between during matches.

== Achievement ==
=== BWF World Tour (1 title, 2 runners-up) ===
The BWF World Tour, which was announced on 19 March 2017 and implemented in 2018, is a series of elite badminton tournaments sanctioned by the Badminton World Federation (BWF). The BWF World Tours are divided into levels of World Tour Finals, Super 1000, Super 750, Super 500, Super 300, and the BWF Tour Super 100.

Men's doubles
Year	Tournament	Level	Partner	Opponent	Score	Result	Ref.
2022	Orléans Masters	Super 100	(Malaysia) Muhammad Haikal	(Netherlands) Ruben Jille (Netherlands) Ties van der Lecq	Walkover	(silver) Runner-up	
2024	Spain Masters	Super 300	(Malaysia) Yap Roy King	(Indonesia) Sabar Karyaman Gutama (Indonesia) Muhammad Reza Pahlevi Isfahani	18–21, 21–17, 19–21	(silver) Runner-up	
2025	Macau Open	Super 300	(Malaysia) Yap Roy King	(Indonesia) Sabar Karyaman Gutama (Indonesia) Muhammad Reza Pahlevi Isfahani	22–20, 21–18	(gold) Winner	

=== BWF International Challenge/Series (4 titles, 2 runners-up) ===
Men's doubles
Year	Tournament	Partner	Opponent	Score	Result	Ref.
2021	Austrian Open	(Malaysia) Muhammad Haikal	(France) Lucas Corvée (France) Ronan Labar	21–17, 21–15	(gold) Winner	
2021	Latvia International	(Malaysia) Muhammad Haikal	(Malaysia) Muhammad Nurfirdaus Azman (Malaysia) Yap Roy King	23–21, 15–21, 19–21	(silver) Runner-up	
2021	Hellas International	(Malaysia) Muhammad Haikal	(Czech Republic) Ondřej Král (Czech Republic) Adam Mendrek	21–16, 21–15	(gold) Winner	
2021	Ukraine International	(Malaysia) Muhammad Haikal	(India) Ishaan Bhatnagar (India) Sai Pratheek K.	21–15, 19–21, 21–15	(gold) Winner	
2021	Scottish Open	(Malaysia) Muhammad Haikal	(Scotland) Christopher Grimley (Scotland) Matthew Grimley	20–22, 16–21	(silver) Runner-up	
2023	Nantes International	(Malaysia) Yap Roy King	(Indonesia) Putra Erwiansyah (Indonesia) Patra Harapan Rindorindo	21–16, 14–21, 21–12	(gold) Winner	

BWF International Challenge tournament
BWF International Series tournament
BWF Future Series tournament
