= Tanisha Crasto =

Indian badminton player (born 2003)

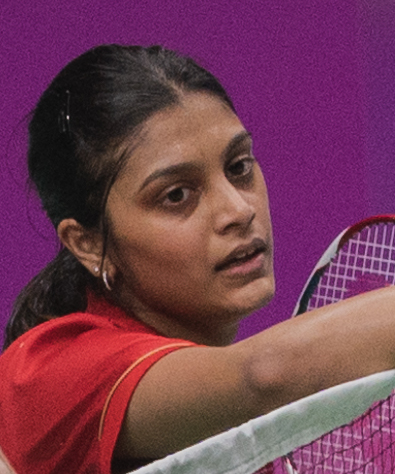
- Crasto at the 2022 Taipei Open

Personal information
- Born: 5 May 2003 (age 23) Dubai, United Arab Emirates
- Years active: 2013–present

Sport
- Country: India (2017–present); United Arab Emirates (2017); Bahrain (2013–2016)
- Sport: Badminton
- Handedness: Right
- Coached by: Pullela Gopichand; Arun Vishnu; Tan Kim Her; Manu Attri

Women's & mixed doubles
- Highest ranking: 13 (WD with Ashwini Ponnappa, 26 November 2024); 16 (XD with Dhruv Kapila, 27 May 2025)
- Current ranking: 24 (XD with Dhruv Kapila, 10 November 2026)
- BWF profile
Medal record
Women's badminton
Representing India
Asia Mixed Team Championships
Bronze medal – third place	2023 Dubai	Mixed team
Asia Team Championships
Gold medal – first place	2024 Selangor	Women's team

Tanisha Crasto (born 5 May 2003) is an Indian badminton player who specialises in mixed doubles. She won the gold at the Asia Team Championships in 2024 and the bronze medal at the 2023 Asia Mixed Team Championships. With her doubles partner Dhruv Kapila, she touched her highest world ranking of 16 in May 2025.

She represented Bahrain and United Arab Emirates before switching to India in 2017. She represented India at the 2024 Paris Summer Olympics in the Women's Doubles event, but didn't advance past the group stage.

== Early life ==
Crasto was born in Dubai to Tulip and Clifford Crasto from Goa, India, and studied at The Indian High School, Dubai.

== Career ==
=== UAE and Bahrain ===
In 2013, Crasto made her international debut for Bahrain in junior tournaments and won her first major BWF international title representing Bahrain at the 2016 Bahrain International Challenge tournament partnered with Aprilsasi Putri Lejarsar Variella. She is ranked among the top UAE based badminton players. She also became the youngest winner of the UAE Open tournament.

In 2017, when she was 14 years old while representing UAE, she created history by winning the Indian Club UAE Open tournament in the women's singles event after beating Negin Amiripour of Iran. She was also part of the Prime Star Sports Academy club that won the Shuttle Time Dubai Club Badminton Championship.

=== India ===
In 2017, after participating in Gulf-based tournaments, she shifted to India and represented Goa in Indian tournaments. She then represented India at the 2019 Badminton Asia Junior Championships and the 2018 and 2019 BWF World Junior Championships.

In 2021, Crasto joined the India national badminton team and participated in the Uber Cup and Sudirman Cup tournaments. She was the runners-up in the mixed doubles event while partnering with Ishaan Bhatnagar at the 2021 Scottish Open.

In 2022, Crasto played her first ever BWF World Tour Super 500 event at the India Open, participating in both the women's doubles (with Rutaparna Panda) and the mixed doubles (with Ishaan Bhatnagar) events. However, she and her respective partners lost in the first rounds of both disciplines, going down to fourth seeds Benyapa Aimsaard and Nuntakarn Aimsaard in the women's doubles and compatriots Gayatri Gopichand and Sai Pratheek K in the mixed doubles. In her next tournament, the 2022 Syed Modi International, she participated in the mixed doubles, where she and Ishaan Bhatnagar clinched their maiden Super 300 title, beating compatriots Srivedya Gurazada and T. Hema Nagendra Babu in the final.

== Achievements ==
=== World Tour (5 titles, 3 runners-up) ===
The BWF World Tour, which was announced on 19 March 2017 and implemented in 2018, is a series of elite badminton tournaments sanctioned by the Badminton World Federation (BWF). The BWF World Tours are divided into levels of World Tour Finals, Super 1000, Super 750, Super 500, Super 300, and the BWF Tour Super 100.

Women's doubles
Year	Tournament	Level	Partner	Opponent	Score	Result
2023	Abu Dhabi Masters	Super 100	(India) Ashwini Ponnappa	(Denmark) Julie Finne-Ipsen (Denmark) Mai Surrow	21–16, 16–21, 21–8	(gold) Winner
2023	Syed Modi International	Super 300	(India) Ashwini Ponnappa	(Japan) Rin Iwanaga (Japan) Kie Nakanishi	14–21, 21–17, 15–21	(silver) Runner-up
2023	Guwahati Masters	Super 100	(India) Ashwini Ponnappa	(Chinese Taipei) Sung Shuo-yun (Chinese Taipei) Yu Chien-hui	21–13, 21–19	(gold) Winner
2023	Odisha Masters	Super 100	(India) Ashwini Ponnappa	(Indonesia) Meilysa Trias Puspita Sari (Indonesia) Rachel Allessya Rose	14–21, 17–21	(silver) Runner-up
2024	Guwahati Masters	Super 100	(India) Ashwini Ponnappa	(China) Li Huazhou (China) Wang Zimeng	21–18, 21–12	(gold) Winner

Mixed doubles
Year	Tournament	Level	Partner	Opponent	Score	Result
2022	Syed Modi International	Super 300	(India) Ishaan Bhatnagar	(India) Hemanagendra Babu (India) Srivedya Gurazada	21–16, 21–12	(gold) Winner
2023	Odisha Masters	Super 100	(India) Dhruv Kapila	(Singapore) Terry Hee (Singapore) Jessica Tan	17–21, 21–19, 23–21	(gold) Winner
2024	Syed Modi International	Super 300	(India) Dhruv Kapila	(Thailand) Dechapol Puavaranukroh (Thailand) Supissara Paewsampran	21–18, 14–21, 8–21	(silver) Runner-up

=== BWF International Challenge/Series (3 titles, 4 runners-up) ===
Women's doubles
Year	Tournament	Partner	Opponent	Score	Result
2016	Bahrain International	(Indonesia) Aprilsasi Putri Lejarsar Variella	(India) Farha Mather (India) Ashna Roy	21–12, 21–18	(gold) Winner
2021	India International	(India) Rutaparna Panda	(India) Treesa Jolly (India) Gayatri Gopichand	21–23, 14–21	(silver) Runner-up
2023	Nantes International	(India) Ashwini Ponnappa	(Chinese Taipei) Hung En-tzu (Chinese Taipei) Lin Yu-pei	21–15, 21–14	(gold) Winner

Mixed doubles
Year	Tournament	Partner	Opponent	Score	Result
2021	India International	(India) Ishaan Bhatnagar	(India) Sai Pratheek K. (India) Gayatri Gopichand	21–16, 21–19	(gold) Winner
2021	Scottish Open	(India) Ishaan Bhatnagar	(England) Callum Hemming (England) Jessica Pugh	15–21, 17–21	(silver) Runner-up
2023	Nantes International	(India) Sai Pratheek K.	(Denmark) Mads Vestergaard (Denmark) Christine Busch	21–14, 14–21, 17–21	(silver) Runner-up
2024	India International	(India) Hariharan Amsakarunan	(India) Rohan Kapoor (India) Ruthvika Gadde	17–21, 19–21	(silver) Runner-up

BWF International Challenge tournament
BWF International Series tournament
BWF Future Series tournament

=== Junior International (2 titles, 1 runner-up) ===
Girls' doubles
Year	Tournament	Partner	Opponent	Score	Result
2019	Bulgarian Junior International	(India) Aditi Bhatt	(Turkey) Bengisu Erçetin (Turkey) Zehra Erdem	21–15, 18–21, 21–18	(gold) Winner
2019	Dubai Junior International	(India) Aditi Bhatt	(India) Treesa Jolly (India) Vishwanath Sri	21–17, 21–17	(gold) Winner

Mixed doubles
Year	Tournament	Partner	Opponent	Score	Result
2019	India Junior International	(India) Ishaan Bhatnagar	(Thailand) Benyapa Aimsaard (Thailand) Ratchapol Makkasasithorn	12–21, 22–20, 20–22	(silver) Runner-up

BWF Junior International Grand Prix tournament
BWF Junior International Challenge tournament
BWF Junior International Series tournament
BWF Junior Future Series tournament

== See also ==
- Badminton in India
- India national badminton team
- List of Indian sportswomen
