= 2024 Japan Open =

Badminton tournament in Japan

Tournament details
- Dates: 20 – 25 August
- Edition: 41
- Level: Super 750
- Total prize money: US$850,000
- Venue: Yokohama Arena
- Location: Yokohama, Japan

Champions
- Men's singles: (France) Alex Lanier
- Women's singles: (Japan) Akane Yamaguchi
- Men's doubles: (Malaysia) Goh Sze Fei (Malaysia) Nur Izzuddin
- Women's doubles: (China) Liu Shengshu (China) Tan Ning
- Mixed doubles: (China) Jiang Zhenbang (China) Wei Yaxin
- Official website: daihatsu-japan-open.com/2024/

The 2024 Japan Open (officially known as the Daihatsu Japan Open 2024) was a badminton tournament which took place at Yokohama Arena in Yokohama, Japan, from 20 to 25 August 2024 and had a total purse of $850,000.

== Tournament ==
The 2024 Japan Open was the twenty-first tournament of the 2024 BWF World Tour and also part of the Japan Open championships, which had been held since 1982. This tournament was organized by the Nippon Badminton Association with sanction from the BWF.

=== Venue ===
This international tournament was held at Yokohama Arena in Yokohama, Japan.

=== Point distribution ===
Below is the point distribution table for each phase of the tournament based on the BWF points system for the BWF World Tour Super 750 event.

Winner	Runner-up	3/4	5/8	9/16	17/32
11,000	9,350	7,700	6,050	4,320	2,660

=== Prize pool ===
The total prize money was US$850,000 with the distribution of the prize money in accordance with BWF regulations.

Event	Winner	Finalist	Semi-finals	Quarter-finals	Last 16	Last 32
Singles	$59,500	$28,900	$11,900	$4,675	$2,550	$850
Doubles	$62,900	$29,750	$11,900	$5,312.50	$2,762.50	$850

== Men's singles ==
=== Seeds ===
1. (China) Shi Yuqi (semi-finals)
2. (Denmark) Viktor Axelsen (withdrew)
3. (Denmark) Anders Antonsen (first round)
4. (Thailand) Kunlavut Vitidsarn (withdrew)
5. (Indonesia) Jonatan Christie (withdrew)
6. (Malaysia) Lee Zii Jia (first round)
7. (China) Li Shifeng (withdrew)
8. (Japan) Kodai Naraoka (semi-finals)

=== Finals ===
Semi-finals
1	(China) Shi Yuqi	21	16	18
(France) Alex Lanier	17	21	21
8	(Japan) Kodai Naraoka	14	16
SWM	(Chinese Taipei) Chou Tien-chen	21	21

Final
(France) Alex Lanier	21	22
SWM	(Chinese Taipei) Chou Tien-chen	17	20

=== Top half ===
==== Section 1 ====
First round
1	(China) Shi YQ	21	23
(Chinese Taipei) Su L-y	18	21
(Chinese Taipei) Lin C-y	21	21
(Japan) K Watanabe	14	10
SWM	(Indonesia) A S Ginting	17	4^{r}
(Japan) Y Tanaka	21	5
PFR	(Chinese Taipei) Chi Y-j	14	12
PFR	(South Korea) Jeon H-j	21	21

Second round
1	(China) Shi YQ	21	21
(Chinese Taipei) Lin C-y	14	17
(Japan) Y Tanaka	22	21
PFR	(South Korea) Jeon H-j	20	9

Quarter-finals
1	(China) Shi YQ	10	21	21
(Japan) Y Tanaka	21	9	11

==== Section 2 ====
First round
6	(Malaysia) Lee Z J	18	13
(France) A Lanier	21	21
(Indonesia) C A Dwi Wardoyo	21	21
PFR	(France) A Merklé	19	17
SWM	(Japan) K Nishimoto	21	21
(China) Weng HY	19	17
(China) Lei LX	17	19
PFR	(Japan) K Takahashi	21	21

Second round
(France) A Lanier	21	21
(Indonesia) C A Dwi Wardoyo	14	13
SWM	(Japan) K Nishimoto	17	21	21
PFR	(Japan) K Takahashi	21	12	16

Quarter-finals
(France) A Lanier	21	21
SWM	(Japan) K Nishimoto	14	14

=== Bottom half ===
==== Section 3 ====
First round
(Japan) K Tsuneyama	21	21
(India) K George	19	14
(Chinese Taipei) Wang T-w	21	21
SWM	(Singapore) Loh K Y	18	16
(Malaysia) Leong J H	21	21
(Japan) T Obayashi	15	17
(Hong Kong) Lee C Y	21	9	19
8	(Japan) K Naraoka	18	21	21

Second round
(Japan) K Tsuneyama	22	11	19
(Chinese Taipei) Wang T-w	20	21	21
(Malaysia) Leong J H	23	10	15
8	(Japan) K Naraoka	21	21	21

Quarter-finals
(Chinese Taipei) Wang T-w	13	21	16
8	(Japan) K Naraoka	21	19	21

==== Section 4 ====
First round
(Chinese Taipei) Lee C-h	21	21
(Hong Kong) Ng K L	19	15
(China) Lu GZ	16	17
SWM	(Chinese Taipei) Chou T-c	21	21
(Thailand) K Wangcharoen	21	21
(Canada) B Yang	8	19
PFR	(India) S K Karunakaran	6
3	(Denmark) A Antonsen	1^{r}

Second round
(Chinese Taipei) Lee C-h	12	12
SWM	(Chinese Taipei) Chou T-c	21	21
(Thailand) K Wangcharoen	18	21	21
PFR	(India) S K Karunakaran	21	18	8

Quarter-finals
SWM	(Chinese Taipei) Chou T-c	21	21
(Thailand) K Wangcharoen	16	10

== Women's singles ==
=== Seeds ===
1. (Chinese Taipei) Tai Tzu-ying (semi-finals)
2. (Japan) Akane Yamaguchi (champion)
3. (China) Wang Zhiyi (second round)
4. (Indonesia) Gregoria Mariska Tunjung (withdrew)
5. (China) Han Yue (quarter-finals)
6. (Japan) Aya Ohori (quarter-finals)
7. (United States) Beiwen Zhang (quarter-finals)
8. (Japan) Nozomi Okuhara (second round)

=== Finals ===
Semi-finals
1	(Chinese Taipei) Tai Tzu-ying
(Thailand) Busanan Ongbamrungphan	w	/	o
SWM	(Thailand) Supanida Katethong	14	20
2	(Japan) Akane Yamaguchi	21	22

Final
(Thailand) Busanan Ongbamrungphan	11	10
2	(Japan) Akane Yamaguchi	21	21

=== Top half ===
==== Section 1 ====
First round
1	(Chinese Taipei) Tai T-y	21	21
(India) A Chaliha	16	12
(India) M Bansod	21	19
PFR	(Ukraine) P Buhrova	23	21
8	(Japan) N Okuhara	21	21
(United States) L Lam	14	14
(Japan) N Nidaira	21	21
(Denmark) L Christophersen	15	17

Second round
1	(Chinese Taipei) Tai T-y	21	21
PFR	(Ukraine) P Buhrova	8	10
8	(Japan) N Okuhara
(Japan) N Nidaira	w	/	o

Quarter-finals
1	(Chinese Taipei) Tai T-y	21	21
(Japan) N Nidaira	13	14

==== Section 2 ====
First round
3	(China) Wang ZY	21	21
(Malaysia) Goh J W	18	10
(Thailand) B Ongbamrungphan	21	21
(Canada) WY Zhang	15	13
6	(Japan) A Ohori	21	21
(Chinese Taipei) Pai Y-p	13	10
(South Korea) Kim G-e	21	21
(India) A Kashyap	13	12

Second round
3	(China) Wang ZY	12	14
(Thailand) B Ongbamrungphan	21	21
6	(Japan) A Ohori	21	21
(South Korea) Kim G-e	17	18

Quarter-finals
(Thailand) B Ongbamrungphan	23	21	23
6	(Japan) A Ohori	25	19	21

=== Bottom half ===
==== Section 3 ====
First round
(Thailand) P Choeikeewong	14	17
(Indonesia) E N T Wardoyo	21	21
(Chinese Taipei) Sung S-y	21	14	13
SWM	(Thailand) S Katethong	12	21	21
(Chinese Taipei) Chiu P-c	10	13
(Canada) M Li	21	21
(Hong Kong) Lo S Y	20	13
7	(United States) BW Zhang	22	21

Second round
(Indonesia) E N T Wardoyo	21	9	7
SWM	(Thailand) S Katethong	19	21	21
(Canada) M Li	21	9	7^{r}
7	(United States) BW Zhang	15	21	17

Quarter-finals
SWM	(Thailand) S Katethong	15	21	21
7	(United States) BW Zhang	21	19	16

==== Section 4 ====
First round
PFR	(Japan) M Suizu	21	21
(Chinese Taipei) Hsu W-c	9	11
(Japan) T Miyazaki	15	20
5	(China) Han Y	21	22
(Denmark) L Kjærsfeldt	16	21	21
(China) Zhang YM	21	19	12
(Thailand) P Chochuwong	14	18
2	(Japan) A Yamaguchi	21	21

Second round
PFR	(Japan) M Suizu	18	13
5	(China) Han Y	21	21
(Denmark) L Kjærsfeldt	12	14
2	(Japan) A Yamaguchi	21	21

Quarter-finals
5	(China) Han Y	21	15	18
2	(Japan) A Yamaguchi	18	21	21

== Men's doubles ==
=== Seeds ===
1. (China) Liang Weikeng / Wang Chang (withdrew)
2. (Denmark) Kim Astrup / Anders Skaarup Rasmussen (withdrew)
3. (South Korea) Kang Min-hyuk / Seo Seung-jae (final)
4. (Indonesia) Fajar Alfian / Muhammad Rian Ardianto (quarter-finals)
5. (China) He Jiting / Ren Xiangyu (first round)
6. (Japan) Takuro Hoki / Yugo Kobayashi (first round)
7. (Chinese Taipei) Lee Jhe-huei / Yang Po-hsuan (second round)
8. (Malaysia) Goh Sze Fei / Nur Izzuddin (champions)

=== Finals ===
Semi-finals
8	(Malaysia) Goh Sze Fei (Malaysia) Nur Izzuddin	21	21
(Indonesia) Leo Rolly Carnando (Indonesia) Bagas Maulana	19	17
(Indonesia) Muhammad Shohibul Fikri (Indonesia) Daniel Marthin	21	15	19
3	(South Korea) Kang Min-hyuk (South Korea) Seo Seung-jae	12	21	21

Final
8	(Malaysia) Goh Sze Fei (Malaysia) Nur Izzuddin	21	21
3	(South Korea) Kang Min-hyuk (South Korea) Seo Seung-jae	19	15

=== Top half ===
==== Section 1 ====
First round
4	(Indonesia) F Alfian (Indonesia) M R Ardianto	22	13	21
(China) Xie HN (China) Zheng WH	20	21	14
(Germany) B Geiss (Germany) J C Völker	21	11	16
(Malaysia) Choong H J (Malaysia) M Haikal	12	21	21
8	(Malaysia) Goh S F (Malaysia) N Izzuddin	21	21
PFR	(Japan) K Shibata (Japan) N Yamada	13	13
(Malaysia) Low H Y (Malaysia) Ng E C	13	17
PFR	(Chinese Taipei) Liu K-h (Chinese Taipei) Yang P-ha	21	21

Second round
4	(Indonesia) F Alfian (Indonesia) M R Ardianto	16	21	21
(Malaysia) Choong H J (Malaysia) M Haikal	21	8	15
8	(Malaysia) Goh S F (Malaysia) N Izzuddin	21	24
PFR	(Chinese Taipei) Liu K-h (Chinese Taipei) Yang P-ha	14	22

Quarter-finals
4	(Indonesia) F Alfian (Indonesia) M R Ardianto	16	21	16
8	(Malaysia) Goh S F (Malaysia) N Izzuddin	21	10	21

==== Section 2 ====
First round
6	(Japan) T Hoki (Japan) Y Kobayashi	16	13
(Chinese Taipei) Chiu H-c (Chinese Taipei) Wang C-l	21	21
(Canada) K Lee (Canada) T A Lindeman	11	9
(Japan) K Mitsuhashi (Japan) H Okamura	21	21
SWM	(Indonesia) M Ahsan (Indonesia) H Setiawan	17	10
(Indonesia) L R Carnando (Indonesia) B Maulana	21	21
(Chinese Taipei) Chen C-k (Chinese Taipei) Chen S-f	20	19
(Indonesia) S K Gutama (Indonesia) M R P Isfahani	22	21

Second round
(Chinese Taipei) Chiu H-c (Chinese Taipei) Wang C-l	21	21	22
(Japan) K Mitsuhashi (Japan) H Okamura	7	23	24
(Indonesia) L R Carnando (Indonesia) B Maulana	21	21
(Indonesia) S K Gutama (Indonesia) M R P Isfahani	18	16

Quarter-finals
(Japan) K Mitsuhashi (Japan) H Okamura	15	12
(Indonesia) L R Carnando (Indonesia) B Maulana	21	21

=== Bottom half ===
==== Section 3 ====
First round
(China) Chen BY (China) Liu Y	21	20	21
(Thailand) P Sukphun (Thailand) P Teeraratsakul	19	22	18
(Chinese Taipei) Lu C-y (Chinese Taipei) Wei C-w	15	21	10
7	(Chinese Taipei) Lee J-h (Chinese Taipei) Yang P-hs	21	17	21
(Indonesia) M S Fikri (Indonesia) D Marthin	21	21
(Chinese Taipei) Chiang C-w (Chinese Taipei) Wu H-y	19	19
(Chinese Taipei) Lee F-c (Chinese Taipei) Lee F-j	14	21	21
5	(China) He J T (China) Ren X Y	21	8	17

Second round
(China) Chen BY (China) Liu Y	17	21	21
7	(Chinese Taipei) Lee J-h (Chinese Taipei) Yang P-hs	21	17	17
(Indonesia) M S Fikri (Indonesia) D Marthin	21	21
(Chinese Taipei) Lee F-c (Chinese Taipei) Lee F-j	16	12

Quarter-finals
(China) Chen BY (China) Liu Y	14	14
(Indonesia) M S Fikri (Indonesia) D Marthin	21	21

==== Section 4 ====
First round
(Denmark) D Lundgaard (Denmark) M Vestergaard	14	13
(Malaysia) Ong Y S (Malaysia) Teo E Y	21	21
(Chinese Taipei) Lin B-w (Chinese Taipei) Su C-h	10	7
SWM	(Malaysia) Man W C (Malaysia) Tee K W	21	21
(United States) Chen Z-y (United States) P Smith	19	15
(Denmark) A Søndergaard (Denmark) J Toft	21	21
(Thailand) S Jomkoh (Thailand) K Kedren	13	16
3	(South Korea) Kang M-h (South Korea) Seo S-j	21	21

Second round
(Malaysia) Ong Y S (Malaysia) Teo E Y	16	19
SWM	(Malaysia) Man W C (Malaysia) Tee K W	21	21
(Denmark) A Søndergaard (Denmark) J Toft	8	12
3	(South Korea) Kang M-h (South Korea) Seo S-j	21	21

Quarter-finals
SWM	(Malaysia) Man W C (Malaysia) Tee K W	15	9
3	(South Korea) Kang M-h (South Korea) Seo S-j	21	21

== Women's doubles ==
=== Seeds ===
1. (South Korea) Baek Ha-na / Lee So-hee (final)
2. (China) Liu Shengshu / Tan Ning (champions)
3. (Japan) Nami Matsuyama / Chiharu Shida (quarter-finals)
4. (Japan) Mayu Matsumoto / Wakana Nagahara (first round)
5. (China) Chen Qingchen / Zheng Yu (withdrew)
6. (Japan) Rin Iwanaga / Kie Nakanishi (semi-finals)
7. (South Korea) Kim So-yeong / Kong Hee-yong (quarter-finals)
8. (China) Jia Yifan / Li Wenmei (semi-finals)

=== Finals ===
Semi-finals
1	(South Korea) Baek Ha-na (South Korea) Lee So-hee	22	21
6	(Japan) Rin Iwanaga (Japan) Kie Nakanishi	20	12
8	(China) Jia Yifan (China) Li Wenmei	16	19
2	(China) Liu Shengshu (China) Tan Ning	21	21

Final
1	(South Korea) Baek Ha-na (South Korea) Lee So-hee	18	20
2	(China) Liu Shengshu (China) Tan Ning	21	22

=== Top half ===
==== Section 1 ====
First round
1	(South Korea) Baek H-n (South Korea) Lee S-h	21	21
(South Korea) Lee Y-l (South Korea) Shin S-c	12	13
(Chinese Taipei) Cheng Y-p (Chinese Taipei) Sun Y-h	23	10
(Hong Kong) Yeung N T (Hong Kong) Yeung P L	25	21
7	(South Korea) Kim S-y (South Korea) Kong H-y	21	23
(Chinese Taipei) N G Chan (Chinese Taipei) Lin C-c	13	21
(Chinese Taipei) Sung S-y (Chinese Taipei) Yu C-h	12	19
(Chinese Taipei) Chang C-h (Chinese Taipei) Yang C-t	21	21

Second round
1	(South Korea) Baek H-n (South Korea) Lee S-h	21	21
(Hong Kong) Yeung N T (Hong Kong) Yeung P L	11	9
7	(South Korea) Kim S-y (South Korea) Kong H-y	21	21
(Chinese Taipei) Chang C-h (Chinese Taipei) Yang C-t	13	9

Quarter-finals
1	(South Korea) Baek H-n (South Korea) Lee S-h	21	21
7	(South Korea) Kim S-y (South Korea) Kong H-y	16	11

==== Section 2 ====
First round
3	(Japan) N Matsuyama (Japan) C Shida	w	/	o
(Thailand) P Pattanawaritthipan (Thailand) A Povanon
(Thailand) O Jongsathapornparn (Thailand) S Suwachai	21	21
(Ukraine) P Buhrova (Ukraine) Y Kantemyr	17	17
6	(Japan) R Iwanaga (Japan) K Nakanishi	19	21	21
(Chinese Taipei) Sung Y-h (Chinese Taipei) Wang Y-q	21	14	12

Second round
3	(Japan) N Matsuyama (Japan) C Shida	21	21
(Thailand) O Jongsathapornparn (Thailand) S Suwachai	13	5
6	(Japan) R Iwanaga (Japan) K Nakanishi	21	21
(China) Li YJ (China) Luo XM	16	13

Quarter-finals
3	(Japan) N Matsuyama (Japan) C Shida	25	19	18
6	(Japan) R Iwanaga (Japan) K Nakanishi	23	21	21

=== Bottom half ===
==== Section 3 ====
First round
(Chinese Taipei) Teng C-h (Chinese Taipei) Yang C-y	22	21
(Japan) K Ishikawa (Japan) M Konegawa	20	7
(Chinese Taipei) Hsu Y-h (Chinese Taipei) Lin J-y	15	19
8	(China) Jia YF (China) Li WM	21	21
(Thailand) L Kanlaha (Thailand) P Muenwong	11	21	19
(United States) F Corbett (United States) A Lee	21	18	21
(South Korea) Jeong N-e (South Korea) Kim H-j	21	16	21
4	(Japan) M Matsumoto (Japan) W Nagahara	15	21	16

Second round
(Chinese Taipei) Teng C-h (Chinese Taipei) Yang C-y	18	21	16
8	(China) Jia YF (China) Li WM	21	14	21
(United States) F Corbett (United States) A Lee	13	17
(South Korea) Jeong N-e (South Korea) Kim H-j	21	21

Quarter-finals
8	(China) Jia YF (China) Li WM	21	21
(South Korea) Jeong N-e (South Korea) Kim H-j	13	11

==== Section 4 ====
First round
(Denmark) J Finne-Ipsen (Denmark) M Surrow	21	21
(India) R Panda (India) S Panda	8	14
(Chinese Taipei) Hu L-f (Chinese Taipei) Jheng Y-c	17	24	11
SWM	(Malaysia) P Tan (Malaysia) Thinaah M	21	22	21
(China) Keng SL (China) Zhang SX	19	23
(Japan) R Hirokami (Japan) Y Kato	21	25
(Canada) J Cheung (Canada) C Choi	7	5
2	(China) Liu SS (China) Tan N	21	21

Second round
(Denmark) J Finne-Ipsen (Denmark) M Surrow	11	20
SWM	(Malaysia) P Tan (Malaysia) Thinaah M	21	22
(Japan) R Hirokami (Japan) Y Kato	9	18
2	(China) Liu SS (China) Tan N	21	21

Quarter-finals
SWM	(Malaysia) P Tan (Malaysia) Thinaah M	21	14	10
2	(China) Liu SS (China) Tan N	17	21	21

== Mixed doubles ==
=== Seeds ===
1. (South Korea) Seo Seung-jae / Chae Yoo-jung (withdrew)
2. (China) Jiang Zhenbang / Wei Yaxin (champions)
3. (Japan) Yuta Watanabe / Arisa Higashino (quarter-finals)
4. (South Korea) Kim Won-ho / Jeong Na-eun (first round)
5. (Thailand) Dechapol Puavaranukroh / Sapsiree Taerattanachai (withdrew)
6. (Hong Kong) Tang Chun Man / Tse Ying Suet (final)
7. (Malaysia) Chen Tang Jie / Toh Ee Wei (quarter-finals)
8. (Malaysia) Goh Soon Huat / Shevon Jemie Lai (first round)

=== Finals ===
Semi-finals
(Chinese Taipei) Yang Po-hsuan (Chinese Taipei) Hu Ling-fang	18	21	19
6	(Hong Kong) Tang Chun Man (Hong Kong) Tse Ying Suet	21	15	21
(China) Cheng Xing (China) Zhang Chi	13	15
2	(China) Jiang Zhenbang (China) Wei Yaxin	21	21

Final
6	(Hong Kong) Tang Chun Man (Hong Kong) Tse Ying Suet	12	12
2	(China) Jiang Zhenbang (China) Wei Yaxin	21	21

=== Top half ===
==== Section 1 ====
First round
3	(Japan) Y Watanabe (Japan) A Higashino	21	21
(United States) P Smith (United States) A Lee	7	3
(Japan) H Nishi (Japan) A Sato	19	21	11
(Chinese Taipei) Ye H-w (Chinese Taipei) N G Chan	21	11	21
SWM	(Singapore) T Hee (Singapore) J Tan	19	21	12
(Chinese Taipei) Chen C-k (Chinese Taipei) Hsu Y-h	21	15	21
(Chinese Taipei) Lin B-w (Chinese Taipei) Lin C-c	12	21	15
(Chinese Taipei) Yang P-hs (Chinese Taipei) Hu L-f	21	11	21

Second round
3	(Japan) Y Watanabe (Japan) A Higashino	21	21
(Chinese Taipei) Ye H-w (Chinese Taipei) N G Chan	11	15
(Chinese Taipei) Chen C-k (Chinese Taipei) Hsu Y-h	20	16
(Chinese Taipei) Yang P-hs (Chinese Taipei) Hu L-f	22	21

Quarter-finals
3	(Japan) Y Watanabe (Japan) A Higashino	9	17
(Chinese Taipei) Yang P-hs (Chinese Taipei) Hu L-f	21	21

==== Section 2 ====
First round
6	(Hong Kong) Tang C M (Hong Kong) Tse Y S	22	18	21
(Chinese Taipei) Wu H-y (Chinese Taipei) Yang C-y	20	21	16
(Indonesia) R N Kusharjanto (Indonesia) L A Kusumawati	21	21
(India) S K Karunakaran (India) A Variyath	10	18
SWM	(Malaysia) Tan K M (Malaysia) Lai P J	18	21	21
PFR	(Chinese Taipei) Chiu H-c (Chinese Taipei) Lin J-y	21	17	19
(Thailand) R Oupthong (Thailand) J Sudjaipraparat	21	15	21
(Indonesia) D Ferdinansyah (Indonesia) G E Widjaja	17	21	17

Second round
6	(Hong Kong) Tang C M (Hong Kong) Tse Y S	17	21	21
(Indonesia) R N Kusharjanto (Indonesia) L A Kusumawati	21	10	12
SWM	(Malaysia) Tan K M (Malaysia) Lai P J	21	21
(Thailand) R Oupthong (Thailand) J Sudjaipraparat	12	16

Quarter-finals
6	(Hong Kong) Tang C M (Hong Kong) Tse Y S	18	25	21
SWM	(Malaysia) Tan K M (Malaysia) Lai P J	21	23	9

=== Bottom half ===
==== Section 3 ====
First round
(Thailand) P Teeraratsakul (Thailand) P Muenwong	21	21
(Germany) J C Völker (Germany) I Lohau	10	13
(China) Cheng X (China) Zhang C	21	21
8	(Malaysia) Goh S H (Malaysia) S J Lai	12	18
(Denmark) J Toft (Denmark) A Magelund	3
(India) B S Reddy (India) N S Reddy	1^{r}
(Thailand) S Jomkoh (Thailand) S Paewsampran	21	21
4	(South Korea) Kim W-h (South Korea) Jeong N-e	18	14

Second round
(Thailand) P Teeraratsakul (Thailand) P Muenwong	12	19
(China) Cheng X (China) Zhang C	21	21
(Denmark) J Toft (Denmark) A Magelund	11	20
(Thailand) S Jomkoh (Thailand) S Paewsampran	21	22

Quarter-finals
(China) Cheng X (China) Zhang C	21	21
(Thailand) S Jomkoh (Thailand) S Paewsampran	18	17

==== Section 4 ====
First round
(United States) Chen Z-y (United States) F Corbett	23	14
(Denmark) M Vestergaard (Denmark) C Busch	25	21
PFR	(Chinese Taipei) Liu K-h (Chinese Taipei) Jheng Y-c	19	14
7	(Malaysia) Chen T J (Malaysia) Toh E W	21	21
(Japan) H Midorikawa (Japan) N Saito	21	21
PFR	(United States) L Wang (United States) E Wang	6	7
(Japan) Y Kaneko (Japan) M Matsutomo	10	10
2	(China) Jiang ZB (China) Wei YX	21	21

Second round
(Denmark) M Vestergaard (Denmark) C Busch	13	13
7	(Malaysia) Chen T J (Malaysia) Toh E W	21	21
(Japan) H Midorikawa (Japan) N Saito	10	17
2	(China) Jiang ZB (China) Wei YX	21	21

Quarter-finals
7	(Malaysia) Chen T J (Malaysia) Toh E W	16	18
2	(China) Jiang ZB (China) Wei YX	21	21

Preceded by 2024 Baoji China Masters	BWF World Tour; 2024 BWF season	Succeeded by 2024 Korea Open; 2024 Indonesia Masters Super 100 I
