= Seo Seung-jae =

South Korean badminton player (born 1997)

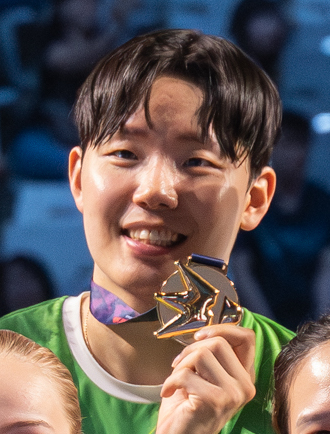
- Seo in 2024

Personal information
- Born: 4 September 1997 (age 29) Buan, North Jeolla Province, South Korea
- Height: 1.82 m (6 ft 0 in)

Sport
- Country: South Korea
- Sport: Badminton
- Handedness: Left

Men's & mixed doubles
- Highest ranking: 1 (MD with Kim Won-ho, 22 July 2025); 2 (MD with Kang Min-hyuk, 20 February 2024); 7 (MD with Choi Sol-gyu, 19 November 2019); 2 (XD with Chae Yoo-jung, 12 March 2024); 5 (XD with Kim Ha-na, 17 May 2018)
- Current ranking: 1 (MD with Kim Won-ho, 10 November 2026)
- BWF profile
Medal record
Men's badminton
Representing South Korea
World Championships
Gold medal – first place	2023 Copenhagen	Men's doubles
Gold medal – first place	2023 Copenhagen	Mixed doubles
Gold medal – first place	2025 Paris	Men's doubles
Bronze medal – third place	2026 New Delhi	Men's doubles
Sudirman Cup
Gold medal – first place	2017 Gold Coast	Mixed team
Silver medal – second place	2023 Suzhou	Mixed team
Silver medal – second place	2025 Xiamen	Mixed team
Bronze medal – third place	2021 Vantaa	Mixed team
Asian Games
Bronze medal – third place	2022 Hangzhou	Mixed doubles
Bronze medal – third place	2022 Hangzhou	Men's team
Bronze medal – third place	2026 Aichi–Nagoya	Men's doubles
Asia Championships
Gold medal – first place	2026 Ningbo	Men's doubles
Silver medal – second place	2024 Ningbo	Mixed doubles
Asia Team Championships
Bronze medal – third place	2018 Alor Setar	Men's team
Bronze medal – third place	2024 Selangor	Men's team
Bronze medal – third place	2026 Qingdao	Men's team
Summer Universiade
Gold medal – first place	2017 Taipei	Men's doubles
World Junior Championships
Gold medal – first place	2013 Bangkok	Mixed team
Bronze medal – third place	2012 Chiba	Mixed team
Bronze medal – third place	2013 Bangkok	Boys' doubles
Asian Junior Championships
Silver medal – second place	2013 Kota Kinabalu	Mixed team
Silver medal – second place	2014 Taipei	Mixed team
Silver medal – second place	2015 Bangkok	Boys' singles
Silver medal – second place	2015 Bangkok	Mixed team

Seo Seung-jae (Korean: 서승재; born 4 September 1997) is a South Korean badminton player. A three-time World champion, he is the first South Korean player in 24 years to have won two gold medals in a single edition of the BWF World Championships, by winning the mixed and men's doubles event at the 2023 BWF World Championships, partnering with Chae Yoo-jung and Kang Min-hyuk respectively. He then went on to win his second men's doubles title in the 2025 BWF World Championships, and first Asian Championships title in 2026 with his partner Kim Won-ho. He competed at the 2017 Sudirman Cup and helped the Korean national team to its fourth trophy. He reached a career-high as world number 1 in the men's doubles with Kim Won-ho.

== Career ==
=== 2014 to 2019 ===
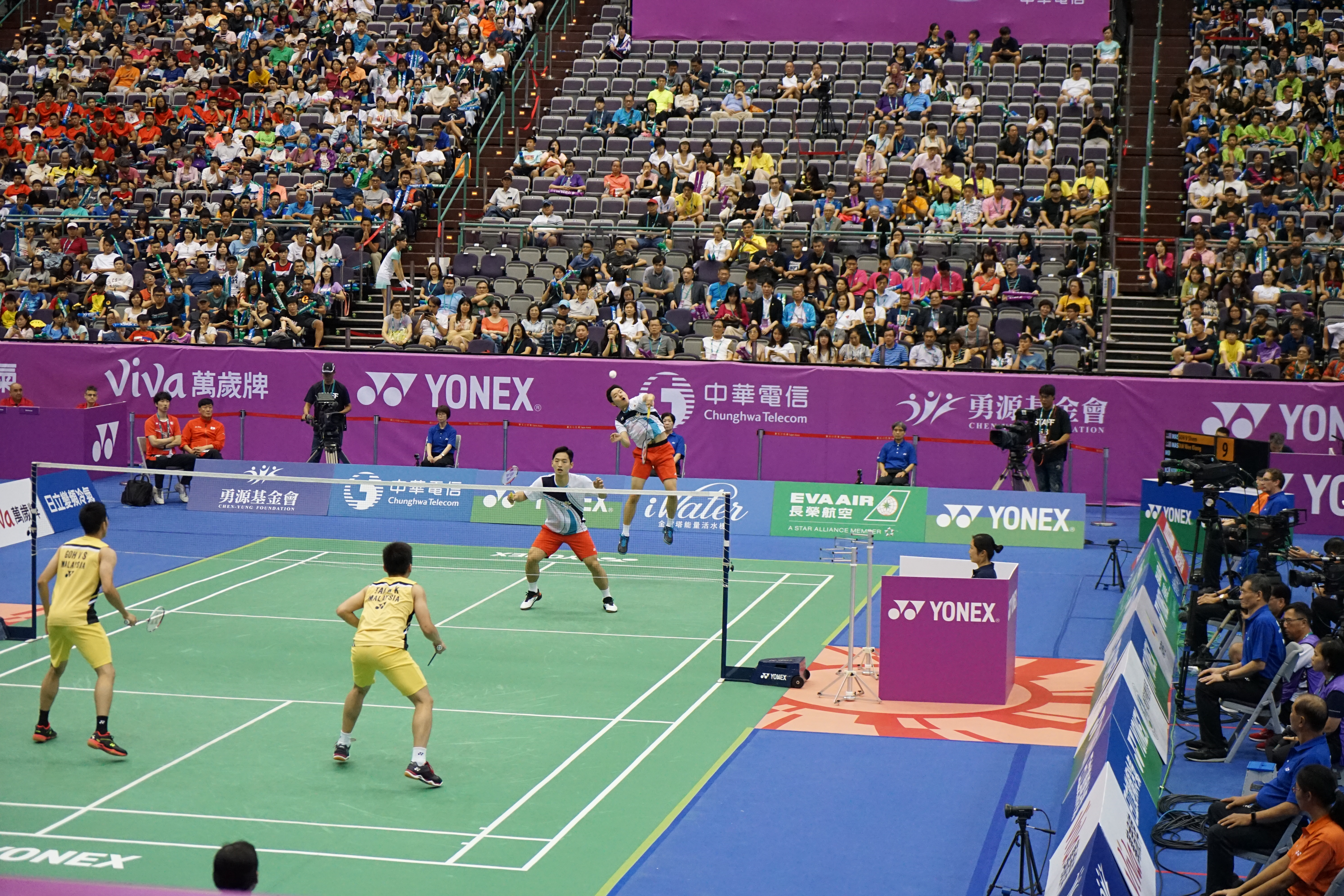
Seo Seung-jae and Choi Sol-gyu against Malaysian pair in the final of 2019 Chinese Taipei Open

In 2014, Seo competed at the Summer Youth Olympics in Nanjing, China.

As a student of Wonkwang University, Seo was entrusted to take part in the 2017 Summer Universiade in Taiwan. He managed to win the men's doubles gold medal with Kim Jae-hwan.

=== 2020 to 2021: Olympic disappointment and Partnership with Choi Sol-Gyu ===
Seo competed at the 2020 Summer Olympics in the men's doubles partnered with Choi Sol-gyu and in the mixed doubles with Chae Yoo-jung. He was eliminated in the group stage and quarter-finals respectively. After the Olympics, Seo played at the Sudirman Cup and the Thomas Cup, where Korea did not get any medal in both events. He only played two BWF World Tour tournaments in 2021, the Indonesia Masters and Indonesia Open.

=== 2022: Beginnings of partnership with Kang Min-hyuk ===
In 2022, Seo officially started a new partnership with his junior Kang Min-hyuk. The duo immediately caught attention by winning the Korea Open, defeating higher-ranked pairs such as Satwiksairaj Rankireddy and Chirag Shetty, Mohammad Ahsan and Hendra Setiawan, and their final opponent Fajar Alfian and Muhammad Rian Ardianto in the journey. The duo also won all their matches in the Thomas Cup. However, Seo and Kang saw their results fluctuate throughout 2022, with notable early exits at the Japan Open, Malaysia Open, and the French Open. Seo resumed playing mixed doubles with Chae Yoo-jung at the Indonesia Masters as semi-finalists. The Seo and Chae combination became champions at the Australian Open over teammates Jeong Na-eun and Kim Won-ho, as well as semi-finalists at the Indonesia Open and quarter-finalists at the World Championships.

=== 2023: Double's Double Glory ===
2023 was Seo's breakthrough year. He won the World Championships in both mixed doubles and men's doubles with his first victory over the world number 1 Zheng Siwei and Huang Yaqiong in mixed doubles, as well as overcoming home favorites Kim Astrup and Anders Skaarup Rasmussen in men's doubles. He also secured his first ever Super 1000 title at the China Open with a second consecutive victory over Zheng and Huang at the quarter-finals. Thanks to his achievements, Seo was awarded the Male Player of the Year for 2023. He completed the year with his first ever World Tour Finals title, this time from men's doubles, after winning against reigning world number 1 Liang Weikeng and Wang Chang.

=== 2025 ===
Starting the 2025 season with new partner, Seo and Kim Won-ho emerged victorious at the opening tournament of the BWF World Tour in the Malaysia Open. Seo continuing his good form in the next tournament by being a runner-up in India Open and winning the Thailand Masters with another partner, Jin Yong. In March, Seo paired with Kim again and won German Open against France's Popov brothers (Toma Junior and Christo) as well as the All England against Leo Rolly Carnando and former winner Bagas Maulana.

Seo's partnership with Kim Won-ho failed to perform up to expectations when they shockingly crashed out in the 2nd round of the 2025 Asia Championships in April.

However, they bounced back quickly, reaching the final in the Singapore Badminton Open and eventually losing to the Malaysian pairing of Aaron Chia and Soh Wooi Yik, before winning the Indonesia Open a week later.

Seo managed to break the record for the most number of BWF World Tour titles in a single calendar year and in a single season by finishing with 12 titles in 2026.

=== 2026 ===
In 2026, Seo and Kim kicked off their successful campaign with 3 wins in all 3 individual tournaments which they had competed in. They started off with a huge win over the Malaysian pairing of Aaron Chia and Soh Wooi Yik in the 2026 Malaysia Open. However, due to Seo's shoulder injury, they withdrew from the India Open.

They returned in March, where they competed in the 2026 All England Open and won their 2nd consecutive All England Men's Doubles title in 2 years.

Following the disappointment from 2025, Seo and Kim dominated the 2026 Badminton Asia Championships in Ningbo, winning the title without dropping a single game throughout the entirety of the tournament.

Both Seo and Kim were also selected to represent South Korea as part of the 2026 Thomas Cup squad. They played in all three group stage matches. Due to an injury of Kang Min-hyuk, Seo and Kim were split up for the first two matchups against Denmark and Chinese Taipei, but reunited in the final group stage matchup against Sweden.

== Achievements ==
=== World Championships ===
Men's doubles
Year	Venue	Partner	Opponent	Score	Result	Ref.
2023	Royal Arena, Copenhagen, Denmark	(South Korea) Kang Min-hyuk	(Denmark) Kim Astrup (Denmark) Anders Skaarup Rasmussen	14–21, 21–15, 21–17	Gold	
2025	Adidas Arena, Paris, France	(South Korea) Kim Won-ho	(China) Chen Boyang (China) Liu Yi	21–17, 21–12	Gold	
2026	Indira Gandhi Arena, New Delhi, India	(South Korea) Kim Won-ho	(Malaysia) Aaron Chia (Malaysia) Soh Wooi Yik	17–21, 18–21	Bronze	

Mixed doubles
Year	Venue	Partner	Opponent	Score	Result	Ref.
2023	Royal Arena, Copenhagen, Denmark	(South Korea) Chae Yoo-jung	(China) Zheng Siwei (China) Huang Yaqiong	21–17, 10–21, 21–18	Gold	

=== Asian Games ===
Men's doubles
Year	Venue	Partner	Opponent	Score	Result
2026	Ichinomiya City Municipal Gymnasium, Ichinomiya, Japan	(South Korea) Kim Won-ho	(Indonesia) Leo Rolly Carnando (Indonesia) Daniel Marthin	11–21, 14–21	Bronze

Mixed doubles
Year	Venue	Partner	Opponent	Score	Result
2022	Binjiang Gymnasium, Hangzhou, China	(South Korea) Chae Yoo-jung	(China) Zheng Siwei (China) Huang Yaqiong	21–13, 15–21, 16–21	Bronze

=== Asian Championships ===
Men's doubles
Year	Venue	Partner	Opponent	Score	Result
2026	Ningbo Olympic Sports Center Gymnasium, Ningbo, China	(South Korea) Kim Won-ho	(South Korea) Kang Min-hyuk (South Korea) Ki Dong-ju	21–13, 21–17	Gold

Mixed doubles
Year	Venue	Partner	Opponent	Score	Result
2024	Ningbo Olympic Sports Center Gymnasium, Ningbo, China	(South Korea) Chae Yoo-jung	(China) Feng Yanzhe (China) Huang Dongping	21–13, 15–21, 14–21	Silver

=== Summer Universiade ===
Men's doubles
Year	Venue	Partner	Opponent	Score	Result
2017	Taipei Gymnasium, Taipei, Taiwan	(South Korea) Kim Jae-hwan	(Japan) Katsuki Tamate (Japan) Kenya Mitsuhashi	21–12, 21–19	Gold

=== World Junior Championships ===
Boys' doubles
Year	Venue	Partner	Opponent	Score	Result
2013	Hua Mark Indoor Stadium, Bangkok, Thailand	(South Korea) Choi Jong-woo	(China) Huang Kaixiang (China) Zheng Siwei	11–21, 13–21	Bronze

=== Asian Junior Championships ===
Boys' singles
Year	Venue	Opponent	Score	Result
2015	CPB Badminton Training Center, Bangkok, Thailand	(China) Lin Guipu	16–21, 11–21	Silver

=== BWF World Tour (30 titles, 19 runners-up) ===
The BWF World Tour, which was announced on 19 March 2017 and implemented in 2018, is a series of elite badminton tournaments sanctioned by the Badminton World Federation (BWF). The BWF World Tour is divided into levels of World Tour Finals, Super 1000, Super 750, Super 500, Super 300, and the BWF Tour Super 100.

Men's doubles
Year	Tournament	Level	Partner	Opponent	Score	Result
2018	Korea Masters	Super 300	(South Korea) Choi Sol-gyu	(Chinese Taipei) Po Li-wei (Chinese Taipei) Wang Chi-lin	21–12, 17–21, 21–18	(gold) Winner
2019	Spain Masters	Super 300	(South Korea) Kim Won-ho	(Chinese Taipei) Lee Yang (Chinese Taipei) Wang Chi-lin	8–21, 21–23	(silver) Runner-up
2019	Chinese Taipei Open	Super 300	(South Korea) Choi Sol-gyu	(Malaysia) Goh V Shem (Malaysia) Tan Wee Kiong	19–21, 21–15, 21–23	(silver) Runner-up
2019	Vietnam Open	Super 100	(South Korea) Choi Sol-gyu	(South Korea) Na Sung-seung (South Korea) Wang Chan	18–21, 21–16, 21–14	(gold) Winner
2019	Hong Kong Open	Super 500	(South Korea) Choi Sol-gyu	(Indonesia) Mohammad Ahsan (Indonesia) Hendra Setiawan	13–21, 21–12, 21–13	(gold) Winner
2019	Syed Modi International	Super 300	(South Korea) Choi Sol-gyu	(China) He Jiting (China) Tan Qiang	18–21, 19–21	(silver) Runner-up
2022	Korea Open	Super 500	(South Korea) Kang Min-hyuk	(Indonesia) Fajar Alfian (Indonesia) Muhammad Rian Ardianto	19–21, 21–15, 21–18	(gold) Winner
2023	German Open	Super 300	(South Korea) Kang Min-hyuk	(South Korea) Choi Sol-gyu (South Korea) Kim Won-ho	19–21, 21–18, 19–21	(silver) Runner-up
2023	Malaysia Masters	Super 500	(South Korea) Kang Min-hyuk	(Malaysia) Man Wei Chong (Malaysia) Tee Kai Wun	21–15, 22–24, 21–19	(gold) Winner
2023	Australian Open	Super 500	(South Korea) Kang Min-hyuk	(Japan) Takuro Hoki (Japan) Yugo Kobayashi	21–17, 21–17	(gold) Winner
2023	BWF World Tour Finals	World Tour Finals	(South Korea) Kang Min-hyuk	(China) Liang Weikeng (China) Wang Chang	21–17, 22–20	(gold) Winner
2024	India Open	Super 750	(South Korea) Kang Min-hyuk	(India) Satwiksairaj Rankireddy (India) Chirag Shetty	15–21, 21–11, 21–18	(gold) Winner
2024	Japan Open	Super 750	(South Korea) Kang Min-hyuk	(Malaysia) Goh Sze Fei (Malaysia) Nur Izzuddin	19–21, 15–21	(silver) Runner-up
2024	Korea Open	Super 500	(South Korea) Kang Min-hyuk	(Indonesia) Leo Rolly Carnando (Indonesia) Bagas Maulana	21–18, 9–21, 8–21	(silver) Runner-up
2024	Hong Kong Open	Super 500	(South Korea) Kang Min-hyuk	(Indonesia) Sabar Karyaman Gutama (Indonesia) Muhammad Reza Pahlevi Isfahani	21–13, 21–17	(gold) Winner
2024	China Masters	Super 750	(South Korea) Jin Yong	(Indonesia) Sabar Karyaman Gutama (Indonesia) Muhammad Reza Pahlevi Isfahani	21–16, 21–16	(gold) Winner
2025	Malaysia Open	Super 1000	(South Korea) Kim Won-ho	(China) Chen Boyang (China) Liu Yi	19–21, 21–12, 21–12	(gold) Winner
2025	India Open	Super 750	(South Korea) Kim Won-ho	(Malaysia) Goh Sze Fei (Malaysia) Nur Izzudin	15–21, 21–13, 16–21	(silver) Runner-up
2025	Thailand Masters	Super 300	(South Korea) Jin Yong	(Indonesia) Muhammad Shohibul Fikri (Indonesia) Daniel Marthin	21–18, 21–17	(gold) Winner
2025	German Open	Super 300	(South Korea) Kim Won-ho	(France) Christo Popov (France) Toma Junior Popov	21–19, 21–17	(gold) Winner
2025	All England Open	Super 1000	(South Korea) Kim Won-ho	(Indonesia) Leo Rolly Carnando (Indonesia) Bagas Maulana	21–19, 21–19	(gold) Winner
2025	Singapore Open	Super 750	(South Korea) Kim Won-ho	(Malaysia) Aaron Chia (Malaysia) Soh Wooi Yik	21–15, 18–21, 19–21	(silver) Runner-up
2025	Indonesia Open	Super 1000	(South Korea) Kim Won-ho	(Indonesia) Sabar Karyaman Gutama (Indonesia) Muhammad Reza Pahlevi Isfahani	18–21, 21–19, 21–12	(gold) Winner
2025	Japan Open	Super 750	(South Korea) Kim Won-ho	(Malaysia) Goh Sze Fei (Malaysia) Nur Izzuddin	21–16, 21–17	(gold) Winner
2025	China Masters	Super 750	(South Korea) Kim Won-ho	(India) Satwiksairaj Rankireddy (India) Chirag Shetty	21–19, 21–15	(gold) Winner
2025	Korea Open	Super 500	(South Korea) Kim Won-ho	(Indonesia) Fajar Alfian (Indonesia) Muhammad Shohibul Fikri	21–16, 23–21	(gold) Winner
2025	French Open	Super 750	(South Korea) Kim Won-ho	(Indonesia) Fajar Alfian (Indonesia) Muhammad Shohibul Fikri	10–21, 21–13, 21–12	(gold) Winner
2025	Japan Masters	Super 500	(South Korea) Kim Won-ho	(Japan) Hiroki Midorikawa (Japan) Kyohei Yamashita	20–22, 21–11, 21–16	(gold) Winner
2025	BWF World Tour Finals	World Tour Finals	(South Korea) Kim Won-ho	(China) Liang Weikeng (China) Wang Chang	21–18, 21–14	(gold) Winner
2026	Malaysia Open	Super 1000	(South Korea) Kim Won-ho	(Malaysia) Aaron Chia (Malaysia) Soh Wooi Yik	21–15, 12–21, 21–18	(gold) Winner
2026	All England Open	Super 1000	(South Korea) Kim Won-ho	(Malaysia) Aaron Chia (Malaysia) Soh Wooi Yik	18–21, 21–12, 21–19	(gold) Winner
2026	Japan Open	Super 750	(South Korea) Kim Won-ho	(Indonesia) Fajar Alfian (Indonesia) Muhammad Shohibul Fikri	19–21, 17–21	(silver) Runner-up
2026	China Open	Super 1000	(South Korea) Kim Won-ho	(Indonesia) Fajar Alfian (Indonesia) Muhammad Shohibul Fikri	21–16, 19–21, 19–21	(silver) Runner-up
2026	Korea Open	Super 500	(South Korea) Kim Won-ho	(Japan) Takuro Hoki (Japan) Yugo Kobayashi	21–12, 20–22, 21–19	(gold) Winner

Mixed doubles
Year	Tournament	Level	Partner	Opponent	Score	Result
2018	New Zealand Open	Super 300	(South Korea) Chae Yoo-jung	(Chinese Taipei) Wang Chi-lin (Chinese Taipei) Lee Chia-hsin	19–21, 21–14, 19–21	(silver) Runner-up
2018	Australian Open	Super 300	(South Korea) Chae Yoo-jung	(Malaysia) Chan Peng Soon (Malaysia) Goh Liu Ying	21–12, 23–21	(gold) Winner
2018	French Open	Super 750	(South Korea) Chae Yoo-jung	(China) Zheng Siwei (China) Huang Yaqiong	19–21, 14–21	(silver) Runner-up
2019	Spain Masters	Super 300	(South Korea) Chae Yoo-jung	(Chinese Taipei) Wang Chi-lin (Chinese Taipei) Cheng Chi-ya	21–18, 21–15	(gold) Winner
2019	German Open	Super 300	(South Korea) Chae Yoo-jung	(Indonesia) Hafiz Faizal (Indonesia) Gloria Emanuelle Widjaja	21–17, 21–11	(gold) Winner
2019	Chinese Taipei Open	Super 300	(South Korea) Chae Yoo-jung	(Hong Kong) Tang Chun Man (Hong Kong) Tse Ying Suet	18–21, 10–21	(silver) Runner-up
2020 (II)	Thailand Open	Super 1000	(South Korea) Chae Yoo-jung	(Thailand) Dechapol Puavaranukroh (Thailand) Sapsiree Taerattanachai	16–21, 20–22	(silver) Runner-up
2020	BWF World Tour Finals	World Tour Finals	(South Korea) Chae Yoo-jung	(Thailand) Dechapol Puavaranukroh (Thailand) Sapsiree Taerattanachai	18–21, 21–8, 8–21	(silver) Runner-up
2022	Australian Open	Super 300	(South Korea) Chae Yoo-jung	(South Korea) Kim Won-ho (South Korea) Jeong Na-eun	21–9, 21–17	(gold) Winner
2023	Thailand Masters	Super 300	(South Korea) Chae Yoo-jung	(China) Feng Yanzhe (China) Huang Dongping	21–18, 15–21, 12–21	(silver) Runner-up
2023	All England Open	Super 1000	(South Korea) Chae Yoo-jung	(China) Zheng Siwei (China) Huang Yaqiong	16–21, 21–16, 12–21	(silver) Runner-up
2023	China Open	Super 1000	(South Korea) Chae Yoo-jung	(France) Thom Gicquel (France) Delphine Delrue	21–19, 21–12	(gold) Winner
2023	Korea Masters	Super 300	(South Korea) Chae Yoo-jung	(China) Jiang Zhenbang (China) Wei Yaxin	21–14, 21–15	(gold) Winner
2023	China Masters	Super 750	(South Korea) Chae Yoo-jung	(China) Zheng Siwei (China) Huang Yaqiong	10–21, 11–21	(silver) Runner-up
2024	French Open	Super 750	(South Korea) Chae Yoo-jung	(China) Feng Yanzhe (China) Huang Dongping	16–21, 16–21	(silver) Runner-up

=== BWF Grand Prix (4 titles, 3 runners-up) ===
The BWF Grand Prix had two levels, the Grand Prix and Grand Prix Gold. It was a series of badminton tournaments sanctioned by the Badminton World Federation (BWF) and played between 2007 and 2017.

Men's doubles
Year	Tournament	Partner	Opponent	Score	Result
2017	Canada Open	(South Korea) Kim Won-ho	(England) Peter Briggs (England) Tom Wolfenden	20–22, 21–16, 19–21	(silver) Runner-up
2017	Macau Open	(South Korea) Kim Won-ho	(Indonesia) Wahyu Nayaka (Indonesia) Ade Yusuf	13–21, 14–21	(silver) Runner-up
2017	Korea Masters	(South Korea) Kim Won-ho	(South Korea) Jung Jae-wook (South Korea) Kim Gi-jung	21–15, 21–16	(gold) Winner

Mixed doubles
Year	Tournament	Partner	Opponent	Score	Result
2017	Chinese Taipei Open	(South Korea) Kim Ha-na	(Chinese Taipei) Wang Chi-lin (Chinese Taipei) Lee Chia-hsin	22–20, 21–10	(gold) Winner
2017	U.S. Open	(South Korea) Kim Ha-na	(South Korea) Kim Won-ho (South Korea) Shin Seung-chan	16–21, 21–14, 21–11	(gold) Winner
2017	Macau Open	(South Korea) Kim Ha-na	(China) Zheng Siwei (China) Huang Yaqiong	14–21, 11–21	(silver) Runner-up
2017	Korea Masters	(South Korea) Kim Ha-na	(South Korea) Choi Sol-gyu (South Korea) Chae Yoo-jung	17–21, 21–13, 21–18	(gold) Winner

BWF Grand Prix Gold tournament
BWF Grand Prix tournament

=== BWF International Challenge/Series (2 titles) ===
Men's doubles
Year	Tournament	Partner	Opponent	Score	Result
2018	Norwegian International	(South Korea) Choi Sol-gyu	(Denmark) Mads Emil Christensen (Denmark) Kristoffer Knudsen	21–12, 21–13	(gold) Winner
2018	Irish Open	(South Korea) Choi Sol-gyu	(Scotland) Jack MacGregor (Scotland) Ciar Pringle	21–17, 21–12	(gold) Winner

BWF International Challenge tournament
BWF International Series tournament
