= 2025 BWF World Championships – Men's doubles =

Badminton championships

Men's doubles at the 2025 BWF World Championships
- Venue: Adidas Arena
- Location: Paris, France
- Dates: 25–31 August
- Competitors: 96 from 28 nations

Medalists
gold medal	Kim Won-ho; Seo Seung-jae	South Korea
silver medal	Chen Boyang; Liu Yi	China
bronze medal	Kim Astrup; Anders Skaarup Rasmussen	Denmark
bronze medal	Satwiksairaj Rankireddy; Chirag Shetty	India

The men's doubles tournament of the 2025 BWF World Championships took place from 26 to 31 August 2025 at the Adidas Arena in Paris.

== Seeds ==
The seeding list was based on the World Rankings of 5 August 2025.

1. (South Korea) Kim Won-ho / Seo Seung-jae (champions)
2. (Malaysia) Aaron Chia / Soh Wooi Yik (quarter-finals)
3. (Malaysia) Goh Sze Fei / Nur Izzuddin (third round)
4. (Indonesia) Fajar Alfian / Muhammad Rian Ardianto (third round)
5. (Denmark) Kim Astrup / Anders Skaarup Rasmussen (semi-finals)
6. (China) Liang Weikeng / Wang Chang (third round)
7. (Malaysia) Man Wei Chong / Tee Kai Wun (quarter-finals)
8. (Indonesia) Sabar Karyaman Gutama / Muhammad Reza Pahlevi Isfahani (second round)

9. (India) Satwiksairaj Rankireddy / Chirag Shetty (semi-final)
10. (Indonesia) Leo Rolly Carnando / Bagas Maulana (third round)
11. (China) Chen Boyang / Liu Yi (final)
12. (Thailand) Kittinupong Kedren / Dechapol Puavaranukroh (second round)
13. (Japan) Takuro Hoki / Yugo Kobayashi (quarter-finals)
14. (England) Ben Lane / Sean Vendy (third round)
15. (Chinese Taipei) Chiu Hsiang-chieh / Wang Chi-lin (third round)
16. (Chinese Taipei) Lee Jhe-huei / Yang Po-hsuan (quarter-finals)

Click on the seed number of a player to go to their draw section.

== Draw ==
The drawing ceremony was held on 14 August 2023.

=== Finals ===
Semi-finals
1	(South Korea) Kim Won-ho (South Korea) Seo Seung-jae	21	21
5	(Denmark) Kim Astrup (Denmark) Anders Skaarup Rasmussen	12	3
11	(China) Chen Boyang (China) Liu Yi	21	18	21
9	(India) Satwiksairaj Rankireddy (India) Chirag Shetty	19	21	12

Final
1	(South Korea) Kim Won-ho (South Korea) Seo Seung-jae	21	21
11	(China) Chen Boyang (China) Liu Yi	17	12

=== Top half ===
==== Section 1 ====
First round
(Singapore) W Koh (Singapore) J Kubo	21	21
(Azerbaijan) A Gabilov (Azerbaijan) D D Pangestu	9	13
(France) É Adam (France) L Rossi	21	21
(England) R Easton (England) A Green	17	14
(France) C Popov (France) T J Popov	21	21
(Australia) K M Edison (Australia) J Yu	12	17
(South Korea) Kim G-j (South Korea) Kim S-r	23	21
(Hong Kong) Law C H (Hong Kong) Yeung S C	21	17

Second round
1	(South Korea) Kim W-h (South Korea) Seo S-j	21	21
(Singapore) W Koh (Singapore) J Kubo	17	12
10	(Indonesia) L R Carnando (Indonesia) B Maulana	21	21
(France) É Adam (France) L Rossi	8	9
7	(Malaysia) Man W C (Malaysia) Tee K W	21	13	21
(France) C Popov (France) T J Popov	15	21	19
14	(England) B Lane (England) S Vendy	21	21
(South Korea) Kim G-j (South Korea) Kim S-r	18	16

Third round
1	(South Korea) Kim W-h (South Korea) Seo S-j	17	21	21
10	(Indonesia) L R Carnando (Indonesia) B Maulana	21	9	4
7	(Malaysia) Man W C (Malaysia) Tee K W	21	21
14	(England) B Lane (England) S Vendy	18	18

Quarter-finals
1	(South Korea) Kim W-h (South Korea) Seo S-j	23	21	21
7	(Malaysia) Man W C (Malaysia) Tee K W	21	23	15

==== Section 2 ====
First round
(Hong Kong) Hung K C (Hong Kong) Lui C W	21	21
(Canada) K Lee (Canada) T A Lindeman	16	15
(Guatemala) C Martínez (Guatemala) J Solís	11	14
(Germany) M Bourakkadi (Germany) K Neumann	21	21
(Scotland) A Dunn (Scotland) A Pringle	21	21
(Switzerland) Y Orteu (Switzerland) M Q Pham	14	18
(Philippines) S Padiz Jr. (Philippines) J Villabrille	21	21
(Algeria) K Mammeri (Algeria) Y S Medel	15	13

Second round
4	(Indonesia) F Alfian (Indonesia) M R Ardianto	14	21	22
(Hong Kong) Hung K C (Hong Kong) Lui C W	21	11	20
13	(Japan) T Hoki (Japan) Y Kobayashi	21	21
(Germany) M Bourakkadi (Germany) K Neumann	15	11
5	(Denmark) K Astrup (Denmark) A S Rasmussen	21	21
(Scotland) A Dunn (Scotland) A Pringle	9	13
15	(Chinese Taipei) Chiu H-c (Chinese Taipei) Wang C-l	21	21
(Philippines) S Padiz Jr. (Philippines) J Villabrille	15	18

Third round
4	(Indonesia) F Alfian (Indonesia) M R Ardianto	21	11	17
13	(Japan) T Hoki (Japan) Y Kobayashi	13	21	21
5	(Denmark) K Astrup (Denmark) A S Rasmussen	21	21
15	(Chinese Taipei) Chiu H-c (Chinese Taipei) Wang C-l	15	13

Quarter-finals
13	(Japan) T Hoki (Japan) Y Kobayashi	21	19	17
5	(Denmark) K Astrup (Denmark) A S Rasmussen	16	21	21

=== Bottom half ===
==== Section 3 ====
First round
(Czech Republic) J Král (Czech Republic) O Král	20	21	21
(Brazil) F Farias (Brazil) D Silva	22	13	18
(Bulgaria) I Rusev (Bulgaria) I Stoynov	14	15
(Denmark) R Kjær (Denmark) F Søgaard	21	21
(Vietnam) Nguyễn Đ H (Vietnam) Trần Đ M	22	21
(Brazil) I Batalha (Brazil) M Voigt	20	16
(United States) Chen Z-y (United States) P Smith	22	21
(Thailand) P Sukphun (Thailand) P Teeraratsakul	20	12

Second round
(Czech Republic) J Král (Czech Republic) O Král	7	19
11	(China) Chen BY (China) Liu Y	21	21
(Denmark) R Kjær (Denmark) F Søgaard	21	18	26
8	(Indonesia) S K Gutama (Indonesia) M R P Isfahani	18	21	24
(Vietnam) Nguyễn Đ H (Vietnam) Trần Đ M	5	18
16	(Chinese Taipei) Lee J-h (Chinese Taipei) Yang P-hs	21	21
(United States) Chen Z-y (United States) P Smith	21	10	17
3	(Malaysia) Goh S F (Malaysia) N Izzuddin	19	21	21

Third round
11	(China) Chen BY (China) Liu Y	21	22
(Denmark) R Kjær (Denmark) F Søgaard	17	20
16	(Chinese Taipei) Lee J-h (Chinese Taipei) Yang P-hs	22	15	23
3	(Malaysia) Goh S F (Malaysia) N Izzuddin	20	21	21

Quarter-finals
11	(China) Chen BY (China) Liu Y	21	21
16	(Chinese Taipei) Lee J-h (Chinese Taipei) Yang P-hs	15	14

==== Section 4 ====
First round
(Chinese Taipei) Liu K-h (Chinese Taipei) Yang P-ha	21	21
(India) H Amsakarunan (India) R K Rethinasabapathi	15	5
(Canada) J Lai (Canada) N Yakura	14	16
(Spain) R García (Spain) C Piris	21	21
(Japan) K Mitsuhashi (Japan) H Okamura	5	13
(Malaysia) J Arif (Malaysia) Yap R K	21	21
(Spain) D Franco (Spain) R Sanjurjo	14	14
(Scotland) C Grimley (Scotland) M Grimley	21	21

Second round
(Chinese Taipei) Liu K-h (Chinese Taipei) Yang P-ha	20	13
9	(India) S Rankireddy (India) C Shetty	22	21
(Spain) R García (Spain) C Piris	16	19
6	(China) Liang WK (China) Wang C	21	21
(Malaysia) J Arif (Malaysia) Yap R K	21	21
12	(Thailand) K Kedren (Thailand) D Puavaranukroh	13	17
(Scotland) C Grimley (Scotland) M Grimley	15	16
2	(Malaysia) A Chia (Malaysia) Soh W Y	21	21

Third round
9	(India) S Rankireddy (India) C Shetty	19	21	21
6	(China) Liang WK (China) Wang C	21	15	17
(Malaysia) J Arif (Malaysia) Yap R K	21	18	24
2	(Malaysia) A Chia (Malaysia) Soh W Y	18	21	26

Quarter-finals
9	(India) S Rankireddy (India) C Shetty	21	21
2	(Malaysia) A Chia (Malaysia) Soh W Y	12	19

== Qualifiers' performances ==
The table below lists out all the qualifiers of this edition by 26 July 2025.

Pair	Date of birth	Pair statistics			Individual statistics			Note
Pair	Date of birth	Appearance	Best Performance(s)		Appearance	Best Performance(s)		Note
Pair	Date of birth	Appearance	Edition(s)	Result	Appearance	Edition(s)	Result	Note
Champions
	Missing required parameter 1=month! (aged −1)							
	Missing required parameter 1=month! (aged −1)							
Finalist
	Missing required parameter 1=month! (aged −1)							
	Missing required parameter 1=month! (aged −1)							
Semi-finalist
(Denmark) Kim Astrup	Missing required parameter 1=month! (aged −1)							
(Denmark) Anders Skaarup Rasmussen	Missing required parameter 1=month! (aged −1)							
(India) Satwiksairaj Rankireddy	Missing required parameter 1=month! (aged −1)							
(India) Chirag Shetty	Missing required parameter 1=month! (aged −1)							
Quarter-finalist
(Malaysia) Man Wei Chong	Missing required parameter 1=month! (aged −1)							
(Malaysia) Tee Kai Wun	Missing required parameter 1=month! (aged −1)							
	Missing required parameter 1=month! (aged −1)							
	Missing required parameter 1=month! (aged −1)							
	Missing required parameter 1=month! (aged −1)							
	Missing required parameter 1=month! (aged −1)							
	Missing required parameter 1=month! (aged −1)							
	Missing required parameter 1=month! (aged −1)							
Third rounders
(Indonesia) Leo Rolly Carnando	Missing required parameter 1=month! (aged −1)							
(Indonesia) Bagas Maulana	Missing required parameter 1=month! (aged −1)							
(England) Ben Lane	Missing required parameter 1=month! (aged −1)							
(England) Sean Vendy	Missing required parameter 1=month! (aged −1)							
	Missing required parameter 1=month! (aged −1)							
	Missing required parameter 1=month! (aged −1)							
	Missing required parameter 1=month! (aged −1)							
	Missing required parameter 1=month! (aged −1)							
	Missing required parameter 1=month! (aged −1)							
	Missing required parameter 1=month! (aged −1)							
	Missing required parameter 1=month! (aged −1)							
	Missing required parameter 1=month! (aged −1)							
	Missing required parameter 1=month! (aged −1)							
	Missing required parameter 1=month! (aged −1)							
	Missing required parameter 1=month! (aged −1)							
	Missing required parameter 1=month! (aged −1)							
Second rounders
	Missing required parameter 1=month! (aged −1)							
	Missing required parameter 1=month! (aged −1)							
	Missing required parameter 1=month! (aged −1)							
	Missing required parameter 1=month! (aged −1)							
	Missing required parameter 1=month! (aged −1)							
	Missing required parameter 1=month! (aged −1)							
	Missing required parameter 1=month! (aged −1)							
	Missing required parameter 1=month! (aged −1)							
	Missing required parameter 1=month! (aged −1)							
	Missing required parameter 1=month! (aged −1)							
	Missing required parameter 1=month! (aged −1)							
	Missing required parameter 1=month! (aged −1)							
	Missing required parameter 1=month! (aged −1)							
	Missing required parameter 1=month! (aged −1)							
	Missing required parameter 1=month! (aged −1)							
	Missing required parameter 1=month! (aged −1)							
	Missing required parameter 1=month! (aged −1)							
	Missing required parameter 1=month! (aged −1)							
	Missing required parameter 1=month! (aged −1)							
	Missing required parameter 1=month! (aged −1)							
	Missing required parameter 1=month! (aged −1)							
	Missing required parameter 1=month! (aged −1)							
	Missing required parameter 1=month! (aged −1)							
	Missing required parameter 1=month! (aged −1)							
	Missing required parameter 1=month! (aged −1)							
	Missing required parameter 1=month! (aged −1)							
	Missing required parameter 1=month! (aged −1)							
	Missing required parameter 1=month! (aged −1)							
	Missing required parameter 1=month! (aged −1)							
	Missing required parameter 1=month! (aged −1)							
First rounders
(Azerbaijan) Agil Gabilov	9 October 2004 (aged 20)	Debut			Debut			PB
(Azerbaijan) Dicky Dwi Pangestu	8 May 2004 (aged 21)	Debut			Debut			PB
(England) Rory Easton	16 January 2001 (aged 24)	Debut			2nd	23	1R	=PB
(England) Alex Green	29 July 2003 (aged 22)	Debut			Debut			PB
(Australia) Keith Mark Edison	31 May 1999 (aged 26)	Debut			Debut			PB
(Australia) Jack Yu	31 May 1999 (aged 26)	Debut			Debut			PB
(Hong Kong) Law Cheuk Him	13 September 2004 (aged 20)	Debut			2nd	17	1R	PB
(Hong Kong) Yeung Shing Choi	21 March 1996 (aged 29)	Debut			Debut			PB
(Canada) Kevin Lee	10 November 1998 (aged 26)	2nd	23	2R	2nd	23	2R	
(Canada) Ty Alexander Lindeman	15 August 1997 (aged 28)	2nd	23	2R	2nd	23	2R	
(Guatemala) Christopher Martínez	5 May 2000 (aged 25)	Debut			Debut			PB
(Guatemala) Jonathan Solís	21 August 1993 (aged 32)	Debut			3rd	22	2R	
(Switzerland) Yann Orteu	23 September 2001 (aged 23)	Debut			Debut			PB
(Switzerland) Minh Quang Pham	7 May 2001 (aged 24)	Debut			Debut			PB
(Algeria) Koceila Mammeri	23 February 1999 (aged 26)	2nd	22	1R	2nd	22	1R	=PB
(Algeria) Youcef Sabri Medel	15 July 1996 (aged 29)	2nd	22	1R	2nd	22	1R	=PB
(Brazil) Fabrício Farias	8 May 2000 (aged 25)	Debut			4th	21,22,23	1R	PB
(Brazil) Davi Silva	15 June 2003 (aged 22)	Debut			Debut			PB
(Bulgaria) Ivan Rusev	6 May 1993 (aged 32)	2nd	23	1R	3rd	18,23	1R	=PB
(Bulgaria) Iliyan Stoynov	25 January 1993 (aged 8)	2nd	23	1R	2nd	23	1R	=PB
(Brazil) Izak Batalha	25 January 2001 (aged 24)	Debut			Debut			PB
(Brazil) Matheus Voigt	19 May 2000 (aged 25)	Debut			Debut			PB
(Thailand) Peeratchai Sukphun	11 November 2004 (aged 20)	Debut			Debut			PB
(Thailand) Pakkapon Teeraratsakul	31 August 2004 (aged 20)	Debut			Debut			PB
(India) Hariharan Amsakarunan	18 May 2003 (aged 22)	Debut			Debut			PB
(India) Ruban Kumar Rethinasabapathi	8 July 2003 (aged 22)	Debut			Debut			PB
(Canada) Jonathan Lai	16 September 1997 (aged 27)	Debut			Debut			PB
(Canada) Nyl Yakura	14 February 1993 (aged 32)	Debut			6th	22	2R	
(Japan) Kenya Mitsuhashi	11 July 1997 (aged 28)	Debut			Debut			PB
(Japan) Hiroki Okamura	6 December 1998 (aged 26)	Debut			3rd	21,22	2R	
(Spain) Daniel Franco	6 April 2005 (aged 20)	Debut			Debut			PB
(Spain) Rodrigo Sanjurjo	15 February 2005 (aged 20)	Debut			Debut			PB
