= Liu Yi (badminton) =

Chinese badminton player (born 2003)

Liu Yi 刘毅
Personal information
- Born: 7 July 2003 (age 23) Anhui, China
- Height: 1.82 m (6 ft 0 in)

Sport
- Country: China
- Sport: Badminton
- Handedness: Right
- Coached by: Chen Qiqiu

Men's doubles
- Highest ranking: 7 (with Chen Boyang, 16 December 2025)
- Current ranking: 13 (with Chen Boyang, 17 November 2026)
- BWF profile
Medal record
Men's badminton
Representing China
World Championships
Silver medal – second place	2025 Paris	Men's doubles
Thomas Cup
Gold medal – first place	2026 Horsens	Men's team
Sudirman Cup
Gold medal – first place	2025 Xiamen	Mixed team
Asian Games
Silver medal – second place	2026 Aichi–Nagoya	Men's team
Asian Championships
Silver medal – second place	2025 Ningbo	Men's doubles
Asia Team Championships
Gold medal – first place	2024 Selangor	Men's team

Liu Yi (simplified Chinese: 刘毅; traditional Chinese: 劉毅; pinyin: Liú Yì; born 7 July 2003) is a Chinese badminton player. He won the silver medal at the 2025 BWF World Championships and 2025 Asian Championships partnered with Chen Boyang. He was part of China winning team in the 2024 Asia Team Championships. Liu captured his first senior title at the 2022 Vietnam International Series with Chen.

== Career ==
Liu won his first senior international title at the Vietnam International Series with Chen Boyang. A week later, Liu won his second consecutive title at the Malaysia International Series tournament.

In March 2023, Liu and Chen won their first BWF Tour 100 title at the 2023 Ruichang China Masters, and won their first BWF World Tour title at the 2023 Orléans Masters.

In 2024, Liu and Chen became the runner-up in the Thailand Open. Together with his temporary partner Chen Xujun, they captured the Macau Open title.

In the beginning of the 2025 season, Liu and Chen reached their first ever final in the BWF World Tour Super 1000 at the Malaysia Open, but the duo were beaten by Korean new pair Kim Won-ho and Seo Seung-jae. They then won the silver medal at the 2025 Asian Championships after being defeated in the final by Aaron Chia and Soh Wooi Yik. In August, Liu and Chen had a wonder run and grabbed silver medal in 2025 BWF World Championships, beaten by Kim Won-ho and Seo Seung-jae in the final.

Liu and Chen grabbed the next title in March 2026 at the German Open against the French pair of Julien Maio and William Villeger. One month later, Liu and Chen helped the Chinese team to defend their title at the 2026 Thomas Cup, beating France at the final with 3 to 1 scoreline. They gained their third title of the season at the Australian Open by beating the third seed from Indonesia, Sabar Karyaman Gutama and Muhammad Reza Pahlevi Isfahani in straight games in the final.

== Achievements ==
=== World Championships ===
Men's doubles
Year	Venue	Partner	Opponent	Score	Result	Ref.
2025	Adidas Arena; Paris, France	(China) Chen Boyang	(South Korea) Kim Won-ho (South Korea) Seo Seung-jae	17–21, 12–21	Silver	

=== Asian Championships ===
Men's doubles
Year	Venue	Partner	Opponent	Score	Result	Ref.
2025	Ningbo Olympic Sports Center Gymnasium; Ningbo, China	(China) Chen Boyang	(Malaysia) Aaron Chia (Malaysia) Soh Wooi Yik	19–21, 17–21	Silver	

=== BWF World Tour (5 titles, 2 runners-up) ===
The BWF World Tour, which was announced on 19 March 2017 and implemented in 2018, is a series of elite badminton tournaments sanctioned by the Badminton World Federation (BWF). The BWF World Tours are divided into levels of World Tour Finals, Super 1000, Super 750, Super 500, Super 300, and the BWF Tour Super 100.

Men's doubles
Year	Tournament	Level	Partner	Opponent	Score	Result	Ref.
2023	Ruichang China Masters	Super 100	(China) Chen Boyang	(Malaysia) Muhammad Haikal (Malaysia) Nur Izzuddin	21–16, 19–21, 21–16	(gold) Winner	
2023	Orléans Masters	Super 300	(China) Chen Boyang	(Indonesia) Muhammad Shohibul Fikri (Indonesia) Bagas Maulana	21–19, 21–17	(gold) Winner	
2024	Thailand Open	Super 500	(China) Chen Boyang	(India) Satwiksairaj Rankireddy (India) Chirag Shetty	15–21, 15–21	(silver) Runner-up	
2024	Macau Open	Super 300	(China) Chen Xujun	(Indonesia) Sabar Karyaman Gutama (Indonesia) Muhammad Reza Pahlevi Isfahani	21–18, 21–14	(gold) Winner	
2025	Malaysia Open	Super 1000	(China) Chen Boyang	(South Korea) Kim Won-ho (South Korea) Seo Seung-jae	21–19, 12–21, 12–21	(silver) Runner-up	
2026	German Open	Super 300	(China) Chen Boyang	(France) Julien Maio (France) William Villeger	17–21, 21–15, 21–12	(gold) Winner	
2026	Australian Open	Super 500	(China) Chen Boyang	(Indonesia) Sabar Karyaman Gutama (Indonesia) Muhammad Reza Pahlevi Isfahani	21–15, 21–19	(gold) Winner	

=== BWF International Challenge/Series (2 titles) ===
Men's doubles
Year	Tournament	Partner	Opponent	Score	Result	Ref.
2022	Vietnam International	(China) Chen Boyang	(Philippines) Christian Bernardo (Philippines) Alvin Morada	21–17, 25–23	(gold) Winner	
2022	Malaysia International	(China) Chen Boyang	(Malaysia) Beh Chun Meng (Malaysia) Goh Boon Zhe	21–11, 21–13	(gold) Winner	

BWF International Challenge tournament
BWF International Series tournament
BWF Future Series tournament
