= Vietnam International Series =

Badminton championships

The Vietnam International Series is an international badminton tournament held in Vietnam. This tournament has been at the International Series level since it was established in 2014. Another tournament named Vietnam International was established in 2000, and the Vietnam Open was established in 1996.

== Previous winners ==
Year	Men's singles	Women's singles	Men's doubles	Women's doubles	Mixed doubles	Ref
2014	(Malaysia) Lim Chi Wing	(Vietnam) Vũ Thị Trang	(Malaysia) Low Juan Shen (Malaysia) Ong Yew Sin	(Vietnam) Nguyễn Thị Sen (Vietnam) Vũ Thị Trang	(Vietnam) Đào Mạnh Thắng (Vietnam) Pham Nhu Thao	
2015	(Indonesia) Krishna Adi Nugraha	(Malaysia) Goh Jin Wei	(Indonesia) Hardianto (Indonesia) Kenas Adi Haryanto	(Indonesia) Gebby Ristiyani Imawan (Indonesia) Tiara Rosalia Nuraidah	(Indonesia) Rian Swastedian (Indonesia) Masita Mahmudin	
2016	(Vietnam) Nguyễn Tiến Minh	(Chinese Taipei) Chen Su-yu	(Vietnam) Đỗ Tuấn Đức (Vietnam) Phạm Hồng Nam	(Vietnam) Nguyễn Thị Sen (Vietnam) Vũ Thị Trang	(Indonesia) Rinov Rivaldy (Indonesia) Vania Arianti Sukoco	
2017– 2019	No competition					
2020	Cancelled (Note: This tournament, originally to be played from 1 to 6 December, was later cancelled due to the COVID-19 pandemic in Vietnam.)					
2021	Cancelled (Note: This tournament, originally to be played from 7 to 12 December, was later cancelled due to the COVID-19 pandemic in Vietnam.)					
2022	(China) Liu Liang	(Vietnam) Nguyễn Thùy Linh	(China) Chen Boyang (China) Liu Yi	(China) Li Yijing (China) Luo Xumin	(China) Jiang Zhenbang (China) Wei Yaxin	
2023	(China) Liu Liang	(China) Wu Luoyu	(China) Xie Haonan (China) Zeng Weihan	(Japan) Kaho Osawa (Japan) Asuka Sugiyama	(China) Zhou Zhihong (China) Yang Jiayi	
2024 I	(South Korea) Kim Byung-jae	(South Korea) Kim Min-ji	(Chinese Taipei) He Zhi-wei (Chinese Taipei) Huang Jui-hsuan	(Indonesia) Isyana Syahira Meida (Indonesia) Rinjani Kwinnara Nastine	(Vietnam) Trần Đình Mạnh (Vietnam) Phạm Thị Khánh	
2024 II	(South Korea) Kim Byung-jae	(Japan) Kana Furukawa	(Chinese Taipei) He Zhi-wei (Chinese Taipei) Huang Jui-hsuan	(China) Lin Fangling (China) Zhou Xinru	(China) Shang Yichen (China) Lin Fangling	
2025 I	(Indonesia) Jelang Fajar	(Vietnam) Vũ Thị Trang	(Thailand) Weeraphat Phakjarung (Thailand) Tanupat Viriyangkura	(Japan) Shinobu Hirata (Japan) Yuzuki Nakashima	(Indonesia) Evano Tangka (Indonesia) Gloria Emanuelle Widjaja	
2025 II	(Vietnam) Lê Đức Phát	(Vietnam) Vũ Thị Trang	(Indonesia) Faizal Pangestu (Indonesia) Anju Siahaan	(South Korea) Jeon Jui (South Korea) Kim Ha-na	(Malaysia) Loh Zi Heng (Malaysia) Noraqilah Maisarah	
2026 I	(India) Dhruv Negi	(Thailand) Tidapron Kleebyeesun	(South Korea) Choi Sol-gyu (South Korea) Lim Su-min	(Thailand) Tidapron Kleebyeesun (Thailand) Nattamon Laisuan	(South Korea) Lim Su-min (South Korea) Kim Hye-rin	
2026 II						

== Performances by nation ==
As of the 2026 I edition

Rank	Nation	MS	WS	MD	WD	XD	Total
1	Vietnam	2	4	1	2	2	11
2	China	2	1	2	2	3	10
3	Indonesia	2		2	2	3	9
4	South Korea	2	1	1	1	1	6
5	Malaysia	1	1	1		1	4
6	Chinese Taipei		1	2			3
6	Japan		1		2		3
6	Thailand		1	1	1		3
9	India	1					1
Total		10	10	10	10	10	50

== See also ==
- Vietnam Open
- Vietnam International Challenge
