= 2019 Chinese Taipei Open =

Badminton championships

Tournament details
- Dates: 3–8 September
- Level: Super 300
- Total prize money: US$500,000
- Venue: Taipei Arena
- Location: Taipei, Taiwan

Champions
- Men's singles: (Chinese Taipei) Chou Tien-chen
- Women's singles: (South Korea) Sung Ji-hyun
- Men's doubles: (Malaysia) Goh V Shem (Malaysia) Tan Wee Kiong
- Women's doubles: (Thailand) Jongkolphan Kititharakul (Thailand) Rawinda Prajongjai
- Mixed doubles: (Hong Kong) Tang Chun Man (Hong Kong) Tse Ying Suet

The 2019 Chinese Taipei Open (officially known as the Yonex Chinese Taipei Open 2019 for sponsorship reasons) was a badminton tournament which took place at Taipei Arena in Taipei, Taiwan, from 3 to 8 September 2019 and had a total purse of $500,000.

== Tournament ==
The 2019 Chinese Taipei Open was the seventeenth tournament of the 2019 BWF World Tour and was also a part of the Chinese Taipei Open championships which had been held since 1980. This tournament was organized by the Chinese Taipei Badminton Association and sanctioned by the BWF.

=== Venue ===
This international tournament was held at Taipei Arena in Taipei, Taiwan.

=== Point distribution ===
Below is the point distribution table for each phase of the tournament based on the BWF points system for the BWF World Tour Super 300 event.

Winner	Runner-up	3/4	5/8	9/16	17/32	33/64	65/128
7,000	5,950	4,900	3,850	2,750	1,670	660	320

=== Prize money ===
The total prize money for this tournament was US$500,000. Distribution of prize money was in accordance with BWF regulations.

Event	Winner	Finals	Semi-finals	Quarter-finals	Last 16
Singles	$37,500	$19,000	$7,250	$3,000	$1,750
Doubles	$39,500	$19,000	$7,000	$3,625	$1,875

== Men's singles ==
=== Seeds ===
1. (Chinese Taipei) Chou Tien-chen (champion)
2. (Hong Kong) Ng Ka Long (first round)
3. (India) Sameer Verma (withdrew)
4. (Malaysia) Lee Zii Jia (second round)
5. (Indonesia) Tommy Sugiarto (first round)
6. (Thailand) Sitthikom Thammasin (withdrew)
7. (Hong Kong) Wong Wing Ki (second round)
8. (Hong Kong) Lee Cheuk Yiu (first round)

=== Finals ===
Semi-finals
1	(Chinese Taipei) Chou Tien-chen	23	21	21
(Indonesia) Shesar Hiren Rhustavito	25	10	13
(South Korea) Heo Kwang-hee	16	21	21
PFQ	(Japan) Koki Watanabe	21	15	12

Final
1	(Chinese Taipei) Chou Tien-chen	21	21
(South Korea) Heo Kwang-hee	12	13

=== Top half ===
==== Section 1 ====
First Round
1	(Chinese Taipei) Chou T-c	21	21	16
(Thailand) S Avihingsanon	23	16	11^{r}
(Japan) K Sakai	20	13
(India) S Verma	22	21
PFQ	(Chinese Taipei) Hsu J-h	23	19	16
(Chinese Taipei) Lin Y-h	21	21	21
Q1	(Malaysia) Cheam J W	21	21
(Indonesia) I M Mustofa	19	15

Second Round
1	(Chinese Taipei) Chou T-c	21	21
(India) S Verma	12	10
(Chinese Taipei) Lin Y-h	21	18	18
Q1	(Malaysia) Cheam J W	17	21	21

Quarter-finals
1	(Chinese Taipei) Chou T-c	21	15	21
Q2	(Malaysia) Cheam J W	11	21	17

==== Section 2 ====
First Round
4	(Malaysia) Lee Z J	21	21
Q3	(Chinese Taipei) Hsueh H-y	7	17
(Thailand) K Vitidsarn	21	18	17
(Indonesia) S H Rhustavito	19	21	21
8	(Hong Kong) Lee C Y	17	16
(Thailand) T Saensomboonsuk	21	21
PFQ	(France) L Claerbout	21	12	21
(Chinese Taipei) Wang T-w	16	21	11

Second Round
4	(Malaysia) Lee Z J	16	20
(Indonesia) S H Rhustavito	21	22
(Thailand) T Saensomboonsuk	21	22
PFQ	(France) L Claerbout	13	20

Quarter-finals
(Indonesia) S H Rhustavito	26	18	21
(Thailand) T Saensomboonsuk	24	21	11

=== Bottom half ===
==== Section 3 ====
First Round
(Indonesia) C A Dwi Wardoyo	19	21	16
(France) L Corvée	21	13	21
(South Korea) Heo K-h	21	13	21
5	(Indonesia) T Sugiarto	16	21	16
(France) T Rouxel	23	21
(Malaysia) Soong J V	21	12
(Malaysia) Liew D	21	21
PFQ	(Japan) Y Igarashi	18	18

Second Round
(France) L Corvée	13	18
(South Korea) Heo K-h	21	21
(France) T Rouxel	21	21
(Malaysia) Liew D	15	19

Quarter-finals
(South Korea) Heo K-h	21	21
(France) T Rouxel	17	14

==== Section 4 ====
First Round
Q2	(Hong Kong) Chan Y C	12	19
(Chinese Taipei) Lu C-h	21	21
(South Korea) Lee D-k	9	21	22
7	(Hong Kong) Wong W K	21	19	24
Q4	(Chinese Taipei) Yang C-c	8	14
PFQ	(Japan) K Watanabe	21	21
(Singapore) Loh K Y	21	21
2	(Hong Kong) Ng K L	19	12

Second Round
(Chinese Taipei) Lu C-h	21	13	21
7	(Hong Kong) Wong W K	16	21	17
PFQ	(Japan) K Watanabe	22	17	21
(Singapore) Loh K Y	20	21	16

Quarter-finals
(Chinese Taipei) Lu C-h	13	19
PFQ	(Japan) K Watanabe	21	21

== Women's singles ==
=== Seeds ===
1. (India) Saina Nehwal (withdrew)
2. (Canada) Michelle Li (final)
3. (United States) Zhang Beiwen (second round)
4. (South Korea) Sung Ji-hyun (champion)
5. (Indonesia) Gregoria Mariska Tunjung (quarter-finals)
6. (Thailand) Busanan Ongbamrungphan (withdrew)
7. (Thailand) Nitchaon Jindapol (quarter-finals)
8. (Scotland) Kirsty Gilmour (first round)

=== Finals ===
Semi-finals
(South Korea) An Se-young	19	15
4	(South Korea) Sung Ji-hyun	21	21
Q2	(Thailand) Supanida Katethong	9	21	10
2	(Canada) Michelle Li	21	15	21

Final
4	(South Korea) Sung Ji-hyun	21	21
2	(Canada) Michelle Li	11	9

=== Top half ===
==== Section 1 ====
First Round
PFQ	(Chinese Taipei) Chiang Y-l	12	17
(South Korea) An S-y	21	21
(South Korea) Kim G-e	22	21
(Germany) F Deprez	20	16
7	(Thailand) N Jindapol	17	21	21
(South Korea) Kim H-m	21	12	10
(Hong Kong) Deng X	14	19
(Chinese Taipei) Pai Y-p	21	21

Second Round
(South Korea) An S-y	21	21
(South Korea) Kim G-e	19	16
7	(Thailand) N Jindapol	21	21
(Chinese Taipei) Pai Y-p	11	12

Quarter-finals
(South Korea) An S-y	21	21
7	(Thailand) N Jindapol	18	19

==== Section 2 ====
First Round
4	(South Korea) Sung J-h	21	21
(Germany) Y Li	19	13
(Japan) A Mine	21	21
(Indonesia) Y Y Susanto	14	14
5	(Indonesia) G M Tunjung	16	22	21
(Hong Kong) Cheung N Y	21	20	9
(South Korea) Sim Y-j	15	18
(Switzerland) S Jaquet	21	21

Second Round
4	(South Korea) Sung J-h	19	21	21
(Japan) A Mine	21	15	12
5	(Indonesia) G M Tunjung	21	21
(Switzerland) S Jaquet	10	15

Quarter-finals
4	(South Korea) Sung J-h	7	21	21
5	(Indonesia) G M Tunjung	21	13	19

=== Bottom half ===
==== Section 3 ====
First Round
Q1	(Chinese Taipei) Chen S-y	18	14
(Indonesia) R Hartawan	21	21
(Indonesia) Fitriani	21	21
8	(Scotland) K Gilmour	18	19
Q2	(Thailand) S Katethong	19	21	21
Q4	(India) R Mookerjee	21	11	13
(Indonesia) L A Mainaky	23	14	15
3	(United States) Zhang BW	21	21	21

Second Round
(Indonesia) R Hartawan	22	18
(Indonesia) Fitriani	24	21
Q2	(Thailand) S Katethong	21	11	21
3	(United States) Zhang BW	12	21	19

Quarter-finals
(Indonesia) Fitriani	13	19
Q2	(Thailand) S Katethong	21	21

==== Section 4 ====
First Round
Q3	(Chinese Taipei) Hung Y-t	22	14	21
(Hong Kong) Yip P Y	20	21	15
(Thailand) P Chaiwan	21	21
PFQ	(Thailand) C Jucharoen	15	19
(Japan) S Kawakami	21	21
PFQ	(Chinese Taipei) Sung S-y	16	15
(Singapore) Yeo J M	19	14
2	(Canada) M Li	21	21

Second Round
Q3	(Chinese Taipei) Hung Y-t	17	25
(Thailand) P Chaiwan	21	27
(Japan) S Kawakami	9	18
2	(Canada) M Li	21	21

Quarter-finals
(Thailand) P Chaiwan	12	13
2	(Canada) M Li	21	21

== Men's doubles ==
=== Seeds ===
1. (Indonesia) Fajar Alfian / Muhammad Rian Ardianto (quarter-finals)
2. (Chinese Taipei) Lee Yang / Wang Chi-lin (semi-finals)
3. (Malaysia) Aaron Chia / Soh Wooi Yik (quarter-finals)
4. (Malaysia) Goh V Shem / Tan Wee Kiong (champions)
5. (Chinese Taipei) Liao Min-chun / Su Ching-heng (first round)
6. (South Korea) Ko Sung-hyun / Shin Baek-cheol (first round)
7. (Chinese Taipei) Lu Ching-yao / Yang Po-han (first round)
8. (Malaysia) Ong Yew Sin / Teo Ee Yi (withdrew)

=== Finals ===
Semi-finals
(Denmark) Mathias Boe (Denmark) Mads Conrad-Petersen	21	11	12
4	(Malaysia) Goh V Shem (Malaysia) Tan Wee Kiong	18	21	21
(South Korea) Choi Sol-gyu (South Korea) Seo Seung-jae	19	25	23
2	(Chinese Taipei) Lee Yang (Chinese Taipei) Wang Chi-lin	21	23	21

Final
4	(Malaysia) Goh V Shem (Malaysia) Tan Wee Kiong	21	15	23
(South Korea) Choi Sol-gyu (South Korea) Seo Seung-jae	19	21	21

=== Top half ===
==== Section 1 ====
First Round
1	(Indonesia) F Alfian (Indonesia) M R Ardianto	22	21
(Malaysia) Goh S F (Malaysia) N Izzuddin	20	14
(Chinese Taipei) Lee J-h (Chinese Taipei) Yang P-hs	21	21
(Chinese Taipei) Lin C-y (Chinese Taipei) Yang M-t	17	14
6	(South Korea) Ko S-h (South Korea) Shin B-c
(Denmark) M Boe (Denmark) M Conrad-Petersen	w	/	o
Q1	(Chinese Taipei) Chiang C-w (Chinese Taipei) Ye H-w	14	14
Q3	(South Korea) Kim W-h (South Korea) Park K-h	21	21

Second Round
1	(Indonesia) F Alfian (Indonesia) M R Ardianto	21	21
(Chinese Taipei) Lee J-h (Chinese Taipei) Yang P-hs	19	18
(Denmark) M Boe (Denmark) M Conrad-Petersen	21	18	21
Q3	(South Korea) Kim W-h (South Korea) Park K-h	19	21	13

Quarter-finals
1	(Indonesia) F Alfian (Indonesia) M R Ardianto	16	21	17
(Denmark) M Boe (Denmark) M Conrad-Petersen	21	19	21

==== Section 2 ====
First Round
4	(Malaysia) Goh V S (Malaysia) Tan W K	21	18	21
(Indonesia) A B Cahyono (Indonesia) M R P Isfahani	9	21	11
(Chinese Taipei) Chang K-c (Chinese Taipei) Lu C-p	21	21
(Singapore) D B Chrisnanta (Singapore) Loh K H	23	23
5	(Chinese Taipei) Liao M-c (Chinese Taipei) Su C-h	14	21	19
(South Korea) Kim G-j (South Korea) Lee Y-d	21	19	21
(Hong Kong) Chung Y (Hong Kong) Tam C H	19	21	16
(Indonesia) S K Gutama (Indonesia) F W Putra	21	18	21

Second Round
4	(Malaysia) Goh V S (Malaysia) Tan W K	15	21	21
(Singapore) D B Chrisnanta (Singapore) Loh K H	21	18	13
(South Korea) Kim G-j (South Korea) Lee Y-d	21	21
(Indonesia) S K Gutama (Indonesia) F W Putra	16	15

Quarter-finals
4	(Malaysia) Goh V S (Malaysia) Tan W K	21	21
(South Korea) Kim G-j (South Korea) Lee Y-d	18	19

=== Bottom half ===
==== Section 3 ====
First Round
(Japan) M Kaneko (Japan) Y Kubota	21	23
(South Korea) Kang M-h (South Korea) Kim J-h	16	21
(South Korea) Choi S-g (South Korea) Seo S-j	25	21
7	(Chinese Taipei) Lu C-y (Chinese Taipei) Yang P-h	23	11
(Indonesia) W Nayaka (Indonesia) A Yusuf	19	21	21
Q4	(Thailand) C Charoenkitamorn (Thailand) K Namdash	21	11	18
(Chinese Taipei) Lin S-k (Chinese Taipei) Tseng M-h	13	12
3	(Malaysia) A Chia (Malaysia) Soh W Y	21	21

Second Round
(Japan) M Kaneko (Japan) Y Kubota	20	21
(South Korea) Choi S-g (South Korea) Seo S-j	22	23
(Indonesia) W Nayaka (Indonesia) A Yusuf	17	15
3	(Malaysia) A Chia (Malaysia) Soh W Y	21	21

Quarter-finals
(South Korea) Choi S-g (South Korea) Seo S-j	21	21
3	(Malaysia) A Chia (Malaysia) Soh W Y	18	14

==== Section 4 ====
First Round
(Japan) H Okamura (Japan) M Onodera	23	15	19
(Japan) A Koga (Japan) T Saito	21	21	21
(Thailand) T Isriyanet (Thailand) K Kedren	17	13
PFQ	(Chinese Taipei) Lee F-c (Chinese Taipei) Lee F-j	21	21
Q2	(Chinese Taipei) Chen X-y (Chinese Taipei) Lin Y-c	16	15
(Malaysia) Chooi K M (Malaysia) Low J S	21	21
(Russia) V Ivanov (Russia) I Sozonov	21	22	13
2	(Chinese Taipei) Lee Y (Chinese Taipei) Wang C-l	19	24	21

Second Round
(Japan) A Koga (Japan) T Saito	21	21
PFQ	(Chinese Taipei) Lee F-c (Chinese Taipei) Lee F-j	15	14
(Malaysia) Chooi K M (Malaysia) Low J S	18	18
2	(Chinese Taipei) Lee Y (Chinese Taipei) Wang C-l	21	21

Quarter-finals
(Japan) A Koga (Japan) T Saito	17	23
2	(Chinese Taipei) Lee Y (Chinese Taipei) Wang C-l	21	25

== Women's doubles ==
=== Seeds ===
1. (Indonesia) Greysia Polii / Apriyani Rahayu (semi-finals)
2. (South Korea) Lee So-hee / Shin Seung-chan (quarter-finals)
3. (South Korea) Kim So-yeong / Kong Hee-yong (final)
4. (Thailand) Jongkolphan Kititharakul / Rawinda Prajongjai (champions)
5. (Japan) Nami Matsuyama / Chiharu Shida (quarter-finals)
6. (Malaysia) Chow Mei Kuan / Lee Meng Yean (withdrew)
7. (Malaysia) Vivian Hoo Kah Mun / Yap Cheng Wen (withdrew)
8. (Japan) Ayako Sakuramoto / Yukiko Takahata (quarter-finals)

=== Finals ===
Semi-finals
1	(Indonesia) Greysia Polii (Indonesia) Apriyani Rahayu	18	21	17
4	(Thailand) Jongkolphan Kititharakul (Thailand) Rawinda Prajongjai	21	12	21
3	(South Korea) Kim So-yeong (South Korea) Kong Hee-yong	22	21
PFQ	(Indonesia) Siti Fadia Silva Ramadhanti (Indonesia) Ribka Sugiarto	20	14

Final
4	(Thailand) Jongkolphan Kititharakul (Thailand) Rawinda Prajongjai	21	18	28
3	(South Korea) Kim So-yeong (South Korea) Kong Hee-yong	19	21	26

=== Top half ===
==== Section 1 ====
First Round
1	(Indonesia) G Polii (Indonesia) A Rahayu	21	21
Q2	(Chinese Taipei) Jiang P-y (Chinese Taipei) Ting Y-y	16	5
(Indonesia) D D Haris (Indonesia) R A Pradipta	21	21
Q4	(Chinese Taipei) Wang S-m (Chinese Taipei) Wei W-y	16	11
8	(Japan) A Sakuramoto (Japan) Y Takahata	21	21
(Indonesia) A S Awanda (Indonesia) P Z Bernadeth	6	14
(Chinese Taipei) Li Z-q (Chinese Taipei) Teng C-h	21	21
(Malaysia) Yap R C (Malaysia) Yap Y	19	16

Second Round
1	(Indonesia) G Polii (Indonesia) A Rahayu	21	21
(Indonesia) D D Haris (Indonesia) R A Pradipta	14	16
8	(Japan) A Sakuramoto (Japan) Y Takahata	21	21
(Chinese Taipei) Li Z-q (Chinese Taipei) Teng C-h	15	11

Quarter-finals
1	(Indonesia) G Polii (Indonesia) A Rahayu	21	21
8	(Japan) A Sakuramoto (Japan) Y Takahata	14	16

==== Section 2 ====
First Round
4	(Thailand) J Kititharakul (Thailand) R Prajongjai	21	21
(Macau) Gong X X (Macau) Ng W C	6	6
(Chinese Taipei) Cheng C-y (Chinese Taipei) Lee C-c	2^{r}
(Hong Kong) Ng T Y (Hong Kong) Yuen S Y	5
5	(Japan) N Matsuyama (Japan) C Shida	21	21
(Australia) S Mapasa (Australia) G Somerville	18	15
(Chinese Taipei) Chang Y-t (Chinese Taipei) Wen H-y	13	23	8
(Chinese Taipei) Kuo Y-w (Chinese Taipei) Lin W-c	21	21	21

Second Round
4	(Thailand) J Kititharakul (Thailand) R Prajongjai	26	21
(Hong Kong) Ng T Y (Hong Kong) Yuen S Y	24	7
5	(Japan) N Matsuyama (Japan) C Shida	21	21
(Chinese Taipei) Kuo Y-w (Chinese Taipei) Lin W-c	12	12

Quarter-finals
4	(Thailand) J Kititharakul (Thailand) R Prajongjai	15	21	21
5	(Japan) N Matsuyama (Japan) C Shida	21	17	15

=== Bottom half ===
==== Section 3 ====
First Round
(Japan) C Hoshi (Japan) A Matsuda	21	21
(Hong Kong) Ng W Y (Hong Kong) Yeung N T	9	12
(India) A Balan (India) P Sawant	19	23	15
PFQ	(Chinese Taipei) Cheng Y-p (Chinese Taipei) Juan T-r	21	21	21
(Thailand) C Chaladchalam (Thailand) P Muenwong	12	21	21
(Chinese Taipei) Liu C-y (Chinese Taipei) Wang Y-q	21	15	17
(Chinese Taipei) Hsu Y-c (Chinese Taipei) Hu L-f	12	21	12
3	(South Korea) Kim S-y (South Korea) Kong H-y	21	17	21

Second Round
(Japan) C Hoshi (Japan) A Matsuda	21	21
PFQ	(Chinese Taipei) Cheng Y-p (Chinese Taipei) Juan T-r	8	7
(Thailand) C Chaladchalam (Thailand) P Muenwong	16	7
3	(South Korea) Kim S-y (South Korea) Kong H-y	21	21

Quarter-finals
(Japan) C Hoshi (Japan) A Matsuda	16	16
3	(South Korea) Kim S-y (South Korea) Kong H-y	21	21

==== Section 4 ====
First Round
Q3	(Chinese Taipei) Chou C-t (Chinese Taipei) Wu S-p	11	15
(Chinese Taipei) Chang C-h (Chinese Taipei) Yang C-t	21	21
(Chinese Taipei) Hung Y-t (Chinese Taipei) Lin Y-c	14	20
PFQ	(Indonesia) S F S Ramadhanti (Indonesia) R Sugiarto	21	22
(France) É Lefel (France) A Tran	21	20	19
Q1	(Chinese Taipei) Chiang K-h (Chinese Taipei) Hung S-h	19	22	21
(Indonesia) N K M Istarani (Indonesia) T O Kusumah	12	18
2	(South Korea) Lee S-h (South Korea) Shin S-c	21	21

Second Round
(Chinese Taipei) Chang C-h (Chinese Taipei) Yang C-t	7^{r}
PFQ	(Indonesia) S F S Ramadhanti (Indonesia) R Sugiarto	11
Q1	(Chinese Taipei) Chiang K-h (Chinese Taipei) Hung S-h	12	9
2	(South Korea) Lee S-h (South Korea) Shin S-c	21	21

Quarter-finals
PFQ	(Indonesia) S F S Ramadhanti (Indonesia) R Sugiarto	21	13	21
2	(South Korea) Lee S-h (South Korea) Shin S-c	19	21	17

== Mixed doubles ==
=== Seeds ===
1. (Malaysia) Chan Peng Soon / Goh Liu Ying (semi-finals)
2. (South Korea) Seo Seung-jae / Chae Yoo-jung (final)
3. (Indonesia) Hafiz Faizal / Gloria Emanuelle Widjaja (semi-finals)
4. (Hong Kong) Tang Chun Man / Tse Ying Suet (champions)
5. (Thailand) Nipitphon Phuangphuapet / Savitree Amitrapai (quarter-finals)
6. (Indonesia) Rinov Rivaldy / Pitha Haningtyas Mentari (quarter-finals)
7. (Indonesia) Tontowi Ahmad / Winny Oktavina Kandow (quarter-finals)
8. (South Korea) Ko Sung-hyun / Eom Hye-won (second round)

=== Finals ===
Semi-finals
1	(Malaysia) Chan Peng Soon (Malaysia) Goh Liu Ying	10	17
4	(Hong Kong) Tang Chun Man (Hong Kong) Tse Ying Suet	21	21
3	(Indonesia) Hafiz Faizal (Indonesia) Gloria Emanuelle Widjaja	17	18
2	(South Korea) Seo Seung-jae (South Korea) Chae Yoo-jung	21	21

Final
4	(Hong Kong) Tang Chun Man (Hong Kong) Tse Ying Suet	21	21
2	(South Korea) Seo Seung-jae (South Korea) Chae Yoo-jung	18	10

=== Top half ===
==== Section 1 ====
First Round
1	(Malaysia) Chan P S (Malaysia) Goh L Y	17	21	21
(Chinese Taipei) Wang C-l (Chinese Taipei) Cheng C-y	21	11	11
(Vietnam) Đỗ T Đ (Vietnam) Pham N T	21	21
PFQ	(Chinese Taipei) Yang M-t (Chinese Taipei) Wu T-j	19	10
6	(Indonesia) R Rivaldy (Indonesia) P H Mentari	13	21	21
Q4	(Denmark) M Christiansen (Denmark) A Bøje	21	19	16
(Indonesia) R Alexander (Indonesia) A Saufika	22	16
(Indonesia) R K Suwardi (Indonesia) P Z Bernadeth	24	21

Second Round
1	(Malaysia) Chan P S (Malaysia) Goh L Y	21	19	21
(Vietnam) Đỗ T Đ (Vietnam) Pham N T	17	21	17
6	(Indonesia) R Rivaldy (Indonesia) P H Mentari	21	21
(Indonesia) R K Suwardi (Indonesia) P Z Bernadeth	12	17

Quarter-finals
1	(Malaysia) Chan P S (Malaysia) Goh L Y	18	21	21
6	(Indonesia) R Rivaldy (Indonesia) P H Mentari	21	14	14

==== Section 2 ====
First Round
4	(Hong Kong) Tang C M (Hong Kong) Tse Y S	21	13	21
(Hong Kong) Yeung M N (Hong Kong) Ng T Y	17	21	17
(South Korea) Choi S-g (South Korea) Shin S-c	16	21	21
Q1	(Chinese Taipei) Lee S-m (Chinese Taipei) Liu C-y	21	13	16
7	(Indonesia) T Ahmad (Indonesia) W O Kandow	21	21
Q3	(Chinese Taipei) Lin C-y (Chinese Taipei) Wang Y-q	17	15
(Indonesia) A E Prasetya (Indonesia) M G Islami	19	22	19
(Chinese Taipei) Lee Y (Chinese Taipei) Yang C-t	21	20	21

Second Round
4	(Hong Kong) Tang C M (Hong Kong) Tse Y S	21	21
(South Korea) Choi S-g (South Korea) Shin S-c	15	18
7	(Indonesia) T Ahmad (Indonesia) W O Kandow	13	21	21
(Chinese Taipei) Lee Y (Chinese Taipei) Yang C-t	21	13	9

Quarter-finals
4	(Hong Kong) Tang C M (Hong Kong) Tse Y S	21	17	21
7	(Indonesia) T Ahmad (Indonesia) W O Kandow	13	21	10

=== Bottom half ===
==== Section 3 ====
First Round
(Indonesia) A B Cahyono (Indonesia) A Wiratama	13	18
(Hong Kong) Mak H C (Hong Kong) Chau H W	21	21
(Canada) J Hurlburt-Yu (Canada) J Wu	21	17	17
5	(Thailand) N Phuangphuapet (Thailand) S Amitrapai	18	21	21
(Malaysia) Hoo P R (Malaysia) Cheah Y S	21	21
(Chinese Taipei) Lu C-y (Chinese Taipei) Lee C-h	13	10
(France) R Labar (France) A Tran	13	22
3	(Indonesia) H Faizal (Indonesia) G E Widjaja	21	24

Second Round
(Hong Kong) Mak H C (Hong Kong) Chau H W	21	17	19
5	(Thailand) N Phuangphuapet (Thailand) S Amitrapai	14	21	21
(Malaysia) Hoo P R (Malaysia) Cheah Y S	18	13
3	(Indonesia) H Faizal (Indonesia) G E Widjaja	21	21

Quarter-finals
5	(Thailand) N Phuangphuapet (Thailand) S Amitrapai	14	14
3	(Indonesia) H Faizal (Indonesia) G E Widjaja	21	21

==== Section 4 ====
First Round
Q2	(Chinese Taipei) Po L-w (Chinese Taipei) Chang C-h	10	12
(Chinese Taipei) Lee J-h (Chinese Taipei) Hsu Y-c	21	21
(Chinese Taipei) Yang P-hs (Chinese Taipei) Hu L-f	11	21	13
8	(South Korea) Ko S-h (South Korea) Eom H-w	21	18	21
(Malaysia) Chen T J (Malaysia) Peck Y W	19	17
(Indonesia) A Maulana (Indonesia) M C Bandaso	21	21
(Hong Kong) Chang T C (Hong Kong) Ng W Y	11	21	14
2	(South Korea) Seo S-j (South Korea) Chae Y-j	21	18	21

Second Round
(Chinese Taipei) Lee J-h (Chinese Taipei) Hsu Y-c	w	/	o
8	(South Korea) Ko S-h (South Korea) Eom H-w
(Indonesia) A Maulana (Indonesia) M C Bandaso	18	21	11
2	(South Korea) Seo S-j (South Korea) Chae Y-j	21	18	21

Quarter-finals
(Chinese Taipei) Lee J-h (Chinese Taipei) Hsu Y-c	15	12
2	(South Korea) Seo S-j (South Korea) Chae Y-j	21	21

Preceded by 2019 Akita Masters	BWF World Tour; 2019 BWF season	Succeeded by 2019 Vietnam Open
