= Chen Boyang =

Chinese badminton player (born 2000)

Chen Boyang 陈柏阳
Personal information
- Born: 6 May 2000 (age 26) Jiangxi, China
- Height: 1.91 m (6 ft 3 in)

Sport
- Country: China
- Sport: Badminton
- Handedness: Right
- Coached by: Chen Qiqiu

Men's doubles
- Highest ranking: 7 (with Liu Yi, 16 December 2025)
- Current ranking: 13 (with Liu Yi, 17 November 2026)
- BWF profile
Medal record
Men's badminton
Representing China
World Championships
| Silver medal – second place | 2025 Paris | Men's doubles |
Thomas Cup
| Gold medal – first place | 2026 Horsens | Men's team |
Sudirman Cup
| Gold medal – first place | 2025 Xiamen | Mixed team |
Asian Championships
| Silver medal – second place | 2025 Ningbo | Men's doubles |
Asia Team Championships
| Gold medal – first place | 2024 Selangor | Men's team |

Chen Boyang (simplified Chinese: 陈柏阳; traditional Chinese: 陳柏陽; pinyin: Chén Bóyáng; born 6 May 2000) is a Chinese badminton player. Partnering Liu Yi, they won a silver medal in the 2025 BWF World Championships and 2025 Asian Championships. He won his first senior title at the Vietnam International Series in 2022 with his partner Liu Yi.

== Career ==
Chen competed in his first tournament with Guo Ruohan at the 2017 China International. He lost in the second round.

In November 2022, he formed a new partnership with Liu Yi and won his first tournament at the Vietnam International Series. In that same month, Chen and Liu won their second title at the Malaysia International Series tournament.

In March 2023, he and Liu won their first BWF Tour 100 title at the 2023 Ruichang China Masters, and won their second BWF World Tour title at the 2023 Orléans Masters.

In 2024, Chen and Liu became the runner-up in the Thailand Open.

In the beginning of the 2025 season, Chen and Liu finished runner-up in the Malaysia Open. They won the silver medal at the 2025 Asian Championships after being defeated by Aaron Chia and Soh Wooi Yik. In August, Chen and Liu had a wonder run and grabbed silver medal in 2025 BWF World Championships, beaten by Kim Won-ho and Seo Seung-jae.

Chen and Liu grabbed the next title in March 2026 at the German Open against the french pair of Julien Maio and William Villeger. One month later, Chen and Liu helped the Chinese team to defend their title at the 2026 Thomas Cup, beating France at the final with 3 to 1 scoreline. They gained their third title of the season at the Australian Open by beating the third seed from Indonesia, Sabar Karyaman Gutama and Muhammad Reza Pahlevi Isfahani in straight games.

== Achievements ==
=== World Championships ===
Men's doubles
| Year | Venue | Partner | Opponent | Score | Result | Ref. |
|---|---|---|---|---|---|---|
| 2025 | Adidas Arena; Paris, France | (China) Liu Yi | (South Korea) Kim Won-ho (South Korea) Seo Seung-jae | 17–21, 12–21 | Silver | |

=== Asian Championships ===
Men's doubles
| Year | Venue | Partner | Opponent | Score | Result | Ref. |
|---|---|---|---|---|---|---|
| 2025 | Ningbo Olympic Sports Center Gymnasium; Ningbo, China | (China) Liu Yi | (Malaysia) Aaron Chia (Malaysia) Soh Wooi Yik | 19–21, 17–21 | Silver | |

=== BWF World Tour (4 titles, 2 runners-up) ===
The BWF World Tour, which was announced on 19 March 2017 and implemented in 2018, is a series of elite badminton tournaments sanctioned by the Badminton World Federation (BWF). The BWF World Tours are divided into levels of World Tour Finals, Super 1000, Super 750, Super 500, Super 300, and the BWF Tour Super 100.

Men's doubles
| Year | Tournament | Level | Partner | Opponent | Score | Result | Ref. |
|---|---|---|---|---|---|---|---|
| 2023 | Ruichang China Masters | Super 100 | (China) Liu Yi | (Malaysia) Muhammad Haikal (Malaysia) Nur Izzuddin | 21–16, 19–21, 21–16 | (gold) Winner | |
| 2023 | Orléans Masters | Super 300 | (China) Liu Yi | (Indonesia) Muhammad Shohibul Fikri (Indonesia) Bagas Maulana | 21–19, 21–17 | (gold) Winner | |
| 2024 | Thailand Open | Super 500 | (China) Liu Yi | (India) Satwiksairaj Rankireddy (India) Chirag Shetty | 15–21, 15–21 | (silver) Runner-up | |
| 2025 | Malaysia Open | Super 1000 | (China) Liu Yi | (South Korea) Kim Won-ho (South Korea) Seo Seung-jae | 21–19, 12–21, 12–21 | (silver) Runner-up | |
| 2026 | German Open | Super 300 | (China) Liu Yi | (France) Julien Maio (France) William Villeger | 17–21, 21–15, 21–12 | (gold) Winner | |
| 2026 | Australian Open | Super 500 | (China) Liu Yi | (Indonesia) Sabar Karyaman Gutama (Indonesia) Muhammad Reza Pahlevi Isfahani | 21–15, 21–19 | (gold) Winner | |

=== BWF International Challenge/Series (2 titles) ===
Men's doubles
| Year | Tournament | Partner | Opponent | Score | Result | Ref. |
|---|---|---|---|---|---|---|
| 2022 | Vietnam International | (China) Liu Yi | (Philippines) Christian Bernardo (Philippines) Alvin Morada | 21–17, 25–23 | (gold) Winner | |
| 2022 | Malaysia International | (China) Liu Yi | (Malaysia) Beh Chun Meng (Malaysia) Goh Boon Zhe | 21–11, 21–13 | (gold) Winner | |

BWF International Challenge tournament
BWF International Series tournament
BWF Future Series tournament
