= 2025 BWF World Championships =

2025 Badminton tournament in France

Tournament details
- Dates: 25–31 August
- Edition: 29th
- Level: International
- Competitors: 383 (53 nations)
- Venue: Adidas Arena
- Location: Paris, France
- Official website: https://www.badmintonparis2025.com/

The 2025 BWF World Championships, officially known as the TotalEnergies BWF World Championships 2025 for sponsorship reasons, was a badminton tournament which was held in Paris, France. Paris hosted the World Championships for a second time after 2010.

== Host city selection ==
Paris was awarded the event in November 2018 during the announcement of 18 major badminton event hosts from 2019 to 2025.

== Competition schedule ==
The tournament lasts over 7 days.

#R	Preliminary rounds	QF	Quarter-finals	SF	Semi-finals	F	Finals

Date	25 Aug	26 Aug	27 Aug	28 Aug	29 Aug	30 Aug	31 Aug
Event	25 Aug	26 Aug	27 Aug	28 Aug	29 Aug	30 Aug	31 Aug
Men's singles	1R		2R	3R	QF	SF	F
Women's singles	1R		2R	3R	QF	SF	F
Men's doubles	1R	2R		3R	QF	SF	F
Women's doubles	1R	2R		3R	QF	SF	F
Mixed doubles		1R	2R	3R	QF	SF	F

== Point distribution ==
Below is the table with the point distribution for each phase of the tournament based on the BWF points system for the World Championships event.

Winner	Runner-up	3/4	5/8	9/16	17/32	33/64
14,500	12,500	10,500	8,200	6,000	3,750	1,450

== Medal summary ==
=== Medal table ===
Canada won its first World Championship medal.

* Host nation (France)

Rank	Nation	Gold	Silver	Bronze	Total
1	China	2	3	1	6
2	Malaysia	1	1	0	2
3	Japan	1	0	2	3
4	South Korea	1	0	1	2
5	Thailand	0	1	0	1
6	Denmark	0	0	2	2
7	Canada	0	0	1	1
7	France*	0	0	1	1
7	India	0	0	1	1
7	Indonesia	0	0	1	1
Totals (10 entries)		5	5	10	20

=== Medalists ===
Events	Gold	Silver	Bronze
Men's singles	Shi Yuqi; China	Kunlavut Vitidsarn; Thailand	Victor Lai; Canada
Men's singles	Shi Yuqi; China	Kunlavut Vitidsarn; Thailand	Anders Antonsen; Denmark
Women's singles	Akane Yamaguchi; Japan	Chen Yufei; China	An Se-young; South Korea
Women's singles	Akane Yamaguchi; Japan	Chen Yufei; China	Putri Kusuma Wardani; Indonesia
Men's doubles	South Korea; Kim Won-ho; Seo Seung-jae	China; Chen Boyang; Liu Yi	Denmark; Kim Astrup; Anders Skaarup Rasmussen
Men's doubles	South Korea; Kim Won-ho; Seo Seung-jae	China; Chen Boyang; Liu Yi	India; Satwiksairaj Rankireddy; Chirag Shetty
Women's doubles	China; Liu Shengshu; Tan Ning	Malaysia; Pearly Tan; Thinaah Muralitharan	Japan; Rin Iwanaga; Kie Nakanishi
Women's doubles	China; Liu Shengshu; Tan Ning	Malaysia; Pearly Tan; Thinaah Muralitharan	Japan; Nami Matsuyama; Chiharu Shida
Mixed doubles	Malaysia; Chen Tang Jie; Toh Ee Wei	China; Jiang Zhenbang; Wei Yaxin	France; Thom Gicquel; Delphine Delrue
Mixed doubles	Malaysia; Chen Tang Jie; Toh Ee Wei	China; Jiang Zhenbang; Wei Yaxin	China; Guo Xinwa; Chen Fanghui

== Qualifiers ==
=== Number of participants ===
Nation		MS	WS	MD	WD	XD	Total	Number of players
Africa	Algeria			1		1	2	3
Africa	Mauritius	1					1	1
Africa	Uganda		1		1		2	2
Asia	China	4	4	2	3	4	17	26
Asia	Chinese Taipei	4	4	3	4	4	19	26
Asia	Hong Kong	2	2	2	2	1	9	16
Asia	India	2	1	2	2	2	9	13
Asia	Indonesia	3	2	3	2	2	12	19
Asia	Israel	1				1	2	2
Asia	Japan	4	3	2	4	2	15	23
Asia	Macau	1				1	2	3
Asia	Malaysia	2	2	4	2	3	12	21
Asia	Myanmar		1				1	1
Asia	Philippines			1	1		2	4
Asia	Singapore	2	2	1		1	6	8
Asia	South Korea	2	3	2	2	1	10	15
Asia	Sri Lanka	2	1		2		5	7
Asia	Thailand	2	4	2	1	3	12	15
Asia	United Arab Emirates				1		1	2
Asia	Vietnam	2	2	1			5	6
Europe	Austria	1			1		2	3
Europe	Azerbaijan	2	1	1		1	5	6
Europe	Belgium	1	1				2	2
Europe	Bulgaria		2	1	2		5	7
Europe	Croatia	1					1	1
Europe	Czech Republic	1	2	1			4	5
Europe	Denmark	2	3	2		2	9	13
Europe	England	2		2	2	2	8	12
Europe	Estonia		1				1	1
Europe	Finland	2					2	2
Europe	France (H)	3	1	2	2	2	10	14
Europe	Germany	2	2	1	1	1	7	9
Europe	Hungary		2				2	2
Europe	Ireland	1	1		1	1	4	5
Europe	Italy	1	1				2	2
Europe	Netherlands				0.5		0.5	1
Europe	Poland				1		1	2
Europe	Scotland		1	2	1	2	6	8
Europe	Serbia					1	1	2
Europe	Slovenia					1	1	2
Europe	Spain	1	1	2	2	1	7	10
Europe	Sweden	1					1	1
Europe	Switzerland	1	1	1	2		5	8
Europe	Turkey		2		1		3	4
Europe	Ukraine		2		1.5	1	4.5	4
Oceania
Oceania	Australia	1	2	1	1		5	6
Oceania	New Zealand	1				1	2	2
Pan Am
Pan Am	Brazil	2	1	2	1	1	7	9
Pan Am	Canada	2	2	2		2	8	10
Pan Am	El Salvador	1					1	1
Pan Am	Guatemala			1		1	2	3
Pan Am	Peru	1	1				2	2
Pan Am	United States		2	1	1	2	6	9
Total (53 NOCs)		65	64	48	48	48	272	383

=== Players participating in two events ===
Player	Gender	Singles	Doubles	Mixed
(Algeria) Koceila Mammeri	Men		Yes	Yes
(Uganda) Fadilah Mohamed Rafi	Women	Yes	Yes	
(Chinese Taipei) Yang Po-hsuan	Men		Yes	Yes
(Chinese Taipei) Sung Shuo-yun	Women	Yes	Yes	
(Chinese Taipei) Hsu Yin-hui	Women		Yes	Yes
(Chinese Taipei) Hung En-tzu	Women		Yes	Yes
(Israel) Misha Zilberman	Men	Yes		Yes
(Thailand) Dechapol Puavaranukroh	Men		Yes	Yes
(Thailand) Pakkapon Teeraratsakul	Men		Yes	Yes
(Thailand) Phataimas Muenwong	Women		Yes	Yes
(Azerbaijan) Dicky Dwi Pangestu	Men	Yes	Yes	
(Bulgaria) Stefani Stoeva	Women	Yes	Yes	
(England) Rory Easton	Men		Yes	Yes
(England) Lizzie Tolman	Women		Yes	Yes
(France) Christo Popov	Men	Yes	Yes	
(France) Toma Junior Popov	Men	Yes	Yes	
(Germany) Malik Bourakkadi	Men		Yes	Yes
(Republic of Ireland) Moya Ryan	Women		Yes	Yes
(Scotland) Alexander Dunn	Men		Yes	Yes
(Scotland) Adam Pringle	Men		Yes	Yes
(Scotland) Julie MacPherson	Women		Yes	Yes
(Spain) Rubén García	Men		Yes	Yes
(Spain) Lucía Rodríguez	Women		Yes	Yes
(Ukraine) Polina Buhrova	Women	Yes	Yes	
(Ukraine) Yevheniia Kantemyr	Women	Yes	Yes	Yes
(Australia) Jack Yu	Men	Yes	Yes	
(New Zealand) Edward Lau	Men	Yes	Yes	
(Brazil) Fabrício Farias	Men		Yes	Yes
(Brazil) Jaqueline Lima	Women		Yes	Yes
(Canada) Jonathan Lai	Men		Yes	Yes
(Canada) Ty Alexander Lindeman	Men		Yes	Yes
(United States) Presley Smith	Men		Yes	Yes
(Guatemala) Christopher Martinez	Men		Yes	Yes

== Performance by nations ==
As of the results of 31 August 2025.

Nation	Quota	First round	Second round	Third round	Quarter- finals	Semi- finals	Finals	Champion
China	17	8	16	14	10	6	5	2
Malaysia	12	4	11	8	5	2	2	1
Japan	15	10	11	9	5	3	1	1
South Korea	10	7	10	6	4	2	1	1
Thailand	12	9	8	5	2	1	1	
Denmark	9	7	8	5	2	2		
Indonesia	12	6	11	9	3	1		
India	9	7	5	3	3	1		
France	10	9	8	4	1	1		
Canada	8	8	2	2	1	1		
Chinese Taipei	19	13	15	8	2			
Singapore	8	8	4	1	1			
Bulgaria	5	5	1	1	1			
Hong Kong	9	7	6	3				
England	8	7	5	1				
Vietnam	5	5	3	1				
Scotland	6	6	6					
Germany	7	7	5					
United States	6	6	4					
Brazil	7	7	2					
Spain	7	7	2					
Sri Lanka	5	5	2					
Ireland	4	4	2					
Turkey	3	3	2					
Philippines	2	2	2					
Ukraine	4.5	4.5	1.5					
Australia	5	5	1					
Azerbaijan	5	5	1					
Switzerland	5	5	1					
Czech Republic	4	4	1					
Belgium	2	2	1					
Croatia	1	1	1					
Serbia	1	1	1					
Netherlands	0.5	0.5	0.5					
Algeria	2	2						
Finland	2	2						
Guatemala	2	2						
Hungary	2	2						
Israel	2	2						
Italy	2	2						
Macau	2	2						
New Zealand	2	2						
Peru	2	2						
Uganda	2	2						
Estonia	1	1						
El Salvador	1	1						
Mauritius	1	1						
Myanmar	1	1						
Nepal	1	1						
Poland	1	1						
Slovenia	1	1						
Sweden	1	1						
United Arab Emirates	1	1						
Withdrew	2							
Total	272	224	160	80	40	20	10	5
