= Muhammad Reza Pahlevi Isfahani =

Indonesian badminton player (born 1998)

Personal information
- Born: 6 August 1998 (age 28) Blitar, East Java, Indonesia
- Height: 1.75 m (5 ft 9 in)

Sport
- Country: Indonesia
- Sport: Badminton
- Handedness: Right

Men's doubles
- Highest ranking: 7 (with Sabar Karyaman Gutama, 18 March 2025)
- Current ranking: 7 (with Sabar Karyaman Gutama, 10 November 2026)
- BWF profile
Medal record
Men's badminton
Representing Indonesia
SEA Games
Gold medal – first place	2025 Thailand	Men's doubles
Gold medal – first place	2025 Thailand	Men's team
Asian Junior Championships
Bronze medal – third place	2015 Bangkok	Mixed team

Muhammad Reza Pahlevi Isfahani (born 6 August 1998) is an Indonesian badminton player affiliated with Jaya Raya Jakarta club. He won the gold medal in the men's doubles and team event at the 2025 SEA Games.

== Career ==
Born in Blitar in 1998, Isfahani has shown his talent as a badminton player since he was young. In 2015, he won the boys' doubles title at the Indonesia Junior International Challenge tournament.

In 2021, Pahlevi played with Sabar Karyaman Gutama, reaching to the semi-finals in the Orléans Masters and the finals in the Spain Masters.

In 2022, Pahlevi and Gutama reached the semi-finals in the Singapore Open and Vietnam Open.

=== 2023 ===
Pahlevi and his partner, Gutama, started the BWF tour in the home tournament, Indonesia Masters, but lost in the second round from Chinese pair He Jiting and Zhou Haodong. In the next tournament, they lost in the first round of the Thailand Masters from unfamous Malaysian pair Low Hang Yee and Ng Eng Cheong in straight sets.

In May, Pahlevi and Gutama competed in the second Asian tour at the Malaysia Masters, but had to lose in qualifying rounds from Chinese Taipei pair Chiu Hsiang-chieh and Yang Ming-tse. In the following week, they were lost at the quarter-finals of the Thailand Open from 3rd seed and eventual winner Chinese pair Liang Weikeng and Wang Chang in three games.

In early August, Pahlevi and Gutama competed at the Australian Open, but had to lose in the first round from Japanese pair Akira Koga and Taichi Saito in straight games.

In September, Pahlevi and Gutama lost in the final of Indonesia International tournament in Medan from fellow Indonesian pair Berry Angriawan and Rian Agung Saputro in rubber games. In the following week, he competed in the mixed doubles at the Indonesia Masters Super 100 I with Marsheilla Gischa Islami but lost at the second round from fellow Indonesian player Marwan Faza and Jessica Maya Rismawardani in rubber games.

=== 2025 ===
In 2025, Isfahani and his partner Gutama reached the final in 3 tournaments, the Indonesia, Macau, and Hylo Opens. As an independent player, Isfahani, along with his partner Gutama, were called up by the Badminton Association of Indonesia to strengthen the SEA Games squad, and contributed a gold medal in the men's team event. They repeated that success by winning a second gold medal in the men's doubles by beating world number 2 Chia and Soh of Malaysia.

=== 2026 ===
It took six months into the season where Isfahani and Gutama reached their first final which would be at the Australian Open. They lost the match by straight games against Chinese pair of Chen Boyang and Liu Yi.

== Achievements ==
=== SEA Games ===
Men's doubles
Year	Venue	Partner	Opponent	Score	Result	Ref.
2025	Gymnasium 4 Thammasat University Rangsit Campus; Pathum Thani, Thailand	(Indonesia) Sabar Karyaman Gutama	(Malaysia) Aaron Chia (Malaysia) Soh Wooi Yik	21–14, 21–17	Gold	

=== BWF World Tour (3 titles, 10 runners-up) ===
The BWF World Tour, which was announced on 19 March 2017 and implemented in 2018, is a series of elite badminton tournaments sanctioned by the Badminton World Federation (BWF). The BWF World Tours are divided into levels of World Tour Finals, Super 1000, Super 750, Super 500, Super 300, and the BWF Tour Super 100.

Men's doubles
Year	Tournament	Level	Partner	Opponent	Score	Result	Ref.
2018	Akita Masters	Super 100	(Indonesia) Akbar Bintang Cahyono	(Japan) Hirokatsu Hashimoto (Japan) Hiroyuki Saeki	21–16, 21–6	(gold) Winner	
2018	Hyderabad Open	Super 100	(Indonesia) Akbar Bintang Cahyono	(India) Satwiksairaj Rankireddy (India) Chirag Shetty	16–21, 14–21	(silver) Runner-up	
2021	Spain Masters	Super 300	(Indonesia) Sabar Karyaman Gutama	(Indonesia) Pramudya Kusumawardana (Indonesia) Yeremia Rambitan	15–21, 21–18, 14–21	(silver) Runner-up	
2023 (I)	Indonesia Masters	Super 100	(Indonesia) Sabar Karyaman Gutama	(Japan) Kakeru Kumagai (Japan) Kota Ogawa	21–18, 21–15	(gold) Winner	
2024	Orléans Masters	Super 300	(Indonesia) Sabar Karyaman Gutama	(Malaysia) Choong Hon Jian (Malaysia) Muhammad Haikal	15–21, 21–18, 14–21	(silver) Runner-up	
2024	Spain Masters	Super 300	(Indonesia) Sabar Karyaman Gutama	(Malaysia) Junaidi Arif (Malaysia) Yap Roy King	21–18, 17–21, 21–19	(gold) Winner	
2024	Hong Kong Open	Super 500	(Indonesia) Sabar Karyaman Gutama	(South Korea) Kang Min-hyuk (South Korea) Seo Seung-jae	13–21, 17–21	(silver) Runner-up	
2024	Macau Open	Super 300	(Indonesia) Sabar Karyaman Gutama	(China) Chen Xujun (China) Liu Yi	18–21, 14–21	(silver) Runner-up	
2024	China Masters	Super 750	(Indonesia) Sabar Karyaman Gutama	(South Korea) Jin Yong (South Korea) Seo Seung-jae	16–21, 16–21	(silver) Runner-up	
2025	Indonesia Open	Super 1000	(Indonesia) Sabar Karyaman Gutama	(South Korea) Kim Won-ho (South Korea) Seo Seung-jae	21–18, 19–21, 12–21	(silver) Runner-up	
2025	Macau Open	Super 300	(Indonesia) Sabar Karyaman Gutama	(Malaysia) Junaidi Arif (Malaysia) Yap Roy King	20–22, 18–21	(silver) Runner-up	
2025	Hylo Open	Super 500	(Indonesia) Sabar Karyaman Gutama	(Chinese Taipei) Chiu Hsiang-chieh (Chinese Taipei) Wang Chi-lin	19–21, 18–21	(silver) Runner-up	
2026	Australian Open	Super 500	(Indonesia) Sabar Karyaman Gutama	(China) Chen Boyang (China) Liu Yi	15–21, 19–21	(silver) Runner-up	

=== BWF International Challenge/Series (2 titles, 6 runners-up) ===
Men's doubles
Year	Tournament	Partner	Opponent	Score	Result	Ref.
2017	Iran Fajr International	(Indonesia) Kenas Adi Haryanto	(India) Arjun M.R. (India) Ramchandran Shlok	8–11, 8–11, 9–11	(silver) Runner-up	
2017	Orleans International	(Indonesia) Kenas Adi Haryanto	(Chinese Taipei) Liao Min-chun (Chinese Taipei) Su Cheng-heng	12–21, 21–14, 17–21	(silver) Runner-up	
2017	Indonesia International	(Indonesia) Kenas Adi Haryanto	(Indonesia) Wahyu Nayaka (Indonesia) Ade Yusuf	18–21, 21–16, 19–21	(silver) Runner-up	
2017	Singapore International	(Indonesia) Kenas Adi Haryanto	(Indonesia) Akbar Bintang Cahyono (Indonesia) Giovani Dicky Octavan	21–18, 21–18	(gold) Winner	
2017	Indonesia International	(Indonesia) Kenas Adi Haryanto	(Indonesia) Sabar Karyaman Gutama (Indonesia) Frengky Wijaya Putra	18–21, 18–21	(silver) Runner-up	
2018	Finnish Open	(Indonesia) Akbar Bintang Cahyono	(Indonesia) Rehan Naufal Kusharjanto (Indonesia) Pramudya Kusumawardana	21–14, 21–17	(gold) Winner	
2023 (I)	Indonesia International	(Indonesia) Sabar Karyaman Gutama	(Indonesia) Berry Angriawan (Indonesia) Rian Agung Saputro	21–19, 19–21, 17–21	(silver) Runner-up	

Mixed doubles
Year	Tournament	Partner	Opponent	Score	Result
2022	Indonesia International	(Indonesia) Melati Daeva Oktavianti	(Indonesia) Dejan Ferdinansyah (Indonesia) Gloria Emanuelle Widjaja	21–19, 9–21, 21–23	(silver) Runner-up

BWF International Challenge tournament
BWF International Series tournament

== Performance timeline ==
Key

W	Won	F	Finalist	SF	Semi-finalist
QF	Quarter-finalist	#R	Rounds 4, 3, 2, 1	RR	Round-robin stage
Q#	Qualification round	A	Absent	w/d	Withdrew
G	Gold	S	Silver	B	Bronze
NH	Not held	N/A	Not applicable	DNQ	Did not qualify

=== National team ===
- Junior level

Team event	2015
Asian Junior Championships	B

- Senior level

Team event	2025	2026	Ref
SEA Games	G	NH	
Thomas Cup	NH	GS	

=== Individual competitions ===
==== Senior level ====
===== Men's doubles =====
Events	2025	2026	Ref
SEA Games	G	NH	
Asian Championships	1R	2R	
World Championships	2R	3R	

Tournament	BWF Superseries / Grand Prix			BWF World Tour									Best	Ref
Tournament	2015	2016	2017	2018	2019	2020	2021	2022	2023	2024	2025	2026	Best	Ref
Malaysia Open	A					NH		A			2R	QF	QF ('26)	
India Open	A					NH		A				2R	2R ('26)	
Indonesia Masters	1R	1R	NH	1R	Q2	A	2R	2R	2R	QF	1R	SF	SF ('26)	
Thailand Masters	NH	A			1R	1R	NH		1R	1R	A		1R ('19, '20, '23, '24)	
All England Open	A										SF	1R	SF ('25)	
Swiss Open	A					NH	A			SF	QF	A	SF ('24)	
Orléans Masters	NA			SF	A	NH	SF	A		F	A		F ('24)	
Thailand Open	A			2R	A		NH	1R	QF	1R	QF	w/d	QF ('23, '25)	
Malaysia Masters	A						NH	A	Q1	1R	A		1R ('24)	
Singapore Open	A			1R	A	NH		SF	A	2R	2R	2R	SF ('22)	
Indonesia Open	A					NH	1R	1R	A	SF	F	SF	F ('25)	
Australian Open	A			1R	1R	NH		2R	1R	A	SF	F	F ('26)	
Macau Open	A		2R	1R	A	NH				F	F	A	F ('24, '25)	
Japan Open	A					NH		A		2R	1R	2R	2R ('24, '26)	
China Open	A					NH			A	1R	2R	2R	2R ('25, '26)	
Chinese Taipei Open	A			1R	1R	NH		A					1R ('18, '19)	
Korea Masters	A			1R	A	NH		A		2R	A		2R ('24)	
China Masters	A		1R	A		NH			A	F	1R	QF	F ('24)	
Indonesia Masters Super 100	NH			SF	2R	NH		A	W	A			W ('23)	
Indonesia Masters Super 100	NH			SF	2R	NH		A	2R	A			W ('23)	
Vietnam Open	A				2R	NH		SF	2R	A			SF ('22)	
Malaysia Super 100	NH								QF	A			QF ('23)	
Denmark Open	A										2R	1R	2R ('25)	
French Open	A					NH	A				QF	1R	QF ('25)	
Hylo Open	A										F	2R	F ('25)	
Korea Open	A			1R	A	NH		A					1R ('18)	
Japan Masters	NH								A	2R	A	1R	2R ('24)	
Hong Kong Open	A					NH			A	F	QF	1R	F ('24)	
Superseries / World Tour Finals	DNQ									SF	SF	DNQ	SF ('24, '25)	
Akita Masters	NH			W	A	NH							W ('18)	
Hyderabad Open	NH			F	A	NH							F ('18)	
New Zealand Open	A		SF	2R	2R	NH							SF ('17)	
Spain Masters	NH			A			F	NH	A	W	NH		W ('24)	
Year-end Ranking	127	110	43	35	98	113	92	60	48	11	8		7	
Tournament	2015	2016	2017	2018	2019	2020	2021	2022	2023	2024	2025	2026	Best	Ref

===== Mixed doubles =====
Tournament	BWF World Tour		Best	Ref
Tournament	2022	2023	Best	Ref
Indonesia Masters Super 100	A	2R	2R ('23)	
Vietnam Open	QF	QF	QF ('22, '23)	
Year-end ranking	192	169	136	
