= Sabar Karyaman Gutama =

Indonesian badminton player (born 1996)

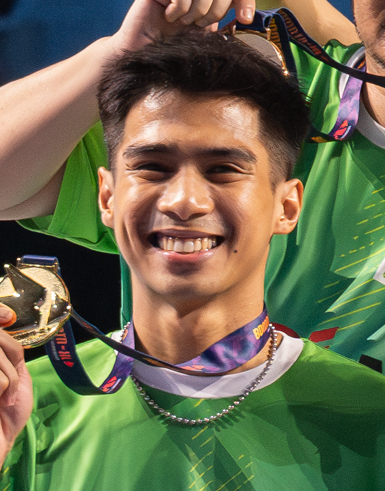
- Gutama in 2024

Personal information
- Born: 8 January 1996 (age 30) Sumedang, West Java, Indonesia
- Height: 1.71 m (5 ft 7 in)

Sport
- Country: Indonesia
- Sport: Badminton
- Handedness: Right
- Coached by: Hendra Setiawan

Men's doubles
- Highest ranking: 7 (with Muhammad Reza Pahlevi Isfahani, 18 March 2025)
- Current ranking: 7 (MD with Muhammad Reza Pahlevi Isfahani, 10 November 2026)
- BWF profile
Medal record
Men's badminton
Representing Indonesia
Asia Mixed Team Championships
Bronze medal – third place	2019 Hong Kong	Mixed team
SEA Games
Gold medal – first place	2025 Thailand	Men's doubles
Gold medal – first place	2025 Thailand	Men's team

Sabar Karyaman Gutama (born 8 January 1996) is an Indonesian badminton player affiliated with Exist Jakarta club. He won the gold medal in the men's doubles and team event at the 2025 SEA Games.

== Career ==
Gutama is a member of Exist Jakarta club. In February 2015, he was selected to join a training camp in South Korea, a cooperation program between Badminton Association of Indonesia and Badminton Korea Association. Gutama entered the Indonesian National training center in 2017.

In 2021, Gutama played with Muhammad Reza Pahlevi Isfahani, reaching to the semi-finals in the Orléans Masters and the finals in the Spain Masters.

In 2022, Gutama and Pahlevi reached the semi-finals in the Singapore Open and Vietnam Open.

=== 2023 ===
Gutama and his partner, Pahlevi, started the BWF tour in the home tournament, Indonesia Masters, but lost in the second round from Chinese pair He Jiting and Zhou Haodong. In the next tournament, they lost in the first round of the Thailand Masters from unfamous Malaysian pair Low Hang Yee and Ng Eng Cheong in straight sets.

In May, Gutama and Pahlevi competed in the second Asian tour at the Malaysia Masters, but had to lose in qualifying rounds from Chinese Taipei pair Chiu Hsiang-chieh and Yang Ming-tse. In the following week, they were lost at the quarter-finals of the Thailand Open from 3rd seed and eventual winner Chinese pair Liang Weikeng and Wang Chang in three games.

In early August, Gutama and Pahlevi competed at the Australian Open, but had to lose in the first round from Japanese pair Akira Koga and Taichi Saito in straight games.

In September, Gutama and Pahlevi lost in the final of Indonesia International tournament in Medan from fellow Indonesian pair Berry Angriawan and Rian Agung Saputro in rubber games.

=== 2025 ===
In 2025, Gutama and his partner Isfahani reached the final in 3 tournaments, the Indonesia, Macau, and Hylo Opens. They were then called up by the Badminton Association of Indonesia to strengthen the SEA Games squad, and successfully contributed a gold medal in the men's team event. In the individual men's doubles, Gutama and Isfahani defeated world ranking number 2 to clinch the gold medal.

=== 2026 ===
It took six months into the season where Gutama and Isfahani reached their first final which would be at the Australian Open. They lost the match by straight games against Chinese pair of Chen Boyang and Liu Yi.

== Achievements ==
=== SEA Games ===
Men's doubles
Year	Venue	Partner	Opponent	Score	Result	Ref.
2025	Gymnasium 4 Thammasat University Rangsit Campus; Pathum Thani, Thailand	(Indonesia) Muhammad Reza Pahlevi Isfahani	(Malaysia) Aaron Chia (Malaysia) Soh Wooi Yik	21–14, 21–17	Gold	

=== BWF World Tour (2 titles, 9 runners-up) ===
The BWF World Tour, which was announced on 19 March 2017 and implemented in 2018, is a series of elite badminton tournaments sanctioned by the Badminton World Federation (BWF). The BWF World Tour is divided into levels of World Tour Finals, Super 1000, Super 750, Super 500, Super 300, and the BWF Tour Super 100.

Men's doubles
Year	Tournament	Level	Partner	Opponent	Score	Result	Ref.
2021	Spain Masters	Super 300	(Indonesia) Muhammad Reza Pahlevi Isfahani	(Indonesia) Pramudya Kusumawardana (Indonesia) Yeremia Rambitan	15–21, 21–18, 14–21	(silver) Runner-up	
2023 (I)	Indonesia Masters	Super 100	(Indonesia) Muhammad Reza Pahlevi Isfahani	(Japan) Kakeru Kumagai (Japan) Kota Ogawa	21–18, 21–15	(gold) Winner	
2024	Orléans Masters	Super 300	(Indonesia) Muhammad Reza Pahlevi Isfahani	(Malaysia) Choong Hon Jian (Malaysia) Muhammad Haikal	15–21, 21–18, 14–21	(silver) Runner-up	
2024	Spain Masters	Super 300	(Indonesia) Muhammad Reza Pahlevi Isfahani	(Malaysia) Junaidi Arif (Malaysia) Yap Roy King	21–18, 17–21, 21–19	(gold) Winner	
2024	Hong Kong Open	Super 500	(Indonesia) Muhammad Reza Pahlevi Isfahani	(South Korea) Kang Min-hyuk (South Korea) Seo Seung-jae	13–21, 17–21	(silver) Runner-up	
2024	Macau Open	Super 300	(Indonesia) Muhammad Reza Pahlevi Isfahani	(China) Chen Xujun (China) Liu Yi	18–21, 14–21	(silver) Runner-up	
2024	China Masters	Super 750	(Indonesia) Muhammad Reza Pahlevi Isfahani	(South Korea) Jin Yong (South Korea) Seo Seung-jae	16–21, 16–21	(silver) Runner-up	
2025	Indonesia Open	Super 1000	(Indonesia) Muhammad Reza Pahlevi Isfahani	(South Korea) Kim Won-ho (South Korea) Seo Seung-jae	21–18, 19–21, 12–21	(silver) Runner-up	
2025	Macau Open	Super 300	(Indonesia) Muhammad Reza Pahlevi Isfahani	(Malaysia) Junaidi Arif (Malaysia) Yap Roy King	20–22, 18–21	(silver) Runner-up	
2025	Hylo Open	Super 500	(Indonesia) Muhammad Reza Pahlevi Isfahani	(Chinese Taipei) Chiu Hsiang-chieh (Chinese Taipei) Wang Chi-lin	19–21, 18–21	(silver) Runner-up	
2026	Australian Open	Super 500	(Indonesia) Muhammad Reza Pahlevi Isfahani	(China) Chen Boyang (China) Liu Yi	15–21, 19–21	(silver) Runner-up	

=== BWF International Challenge/Series (2 titles, 1 runner-up) ===
Men's doubles
Year	Tournament	Partner	Opponent	Score	Result	Ref.
2017	Indonesia International	(Indonesia) Frengky Wijaya Putra	(Indonesia) Kenas Adi Haryanto (Indonesia) Muhammad Reza Pahlevi Isfahani	21–18, 21–18	(gold) Winner	
2018	Indonesia International	(Indonesia) Frengky Wijaya Putra	(Indonesia) Muhammad Shohibul Fikri (Indonesia) Bagas Maulana	21–16, 21–15	(gold) Winner	
2023 (I)	Indonesia International	(Indonesia) Muhammad Reza Pahlevi Isfahani	(Indonesia) Berry Angriawan (Indonesia) Rian Agung Saputro	21–19, 19–21, 17–21	(silver) Runner-up	

BWF International Challenge tournament
BWF Future Series tournament

=== BWF Junior International (1 title, 1 runner-up) ===
Boys' doubles
Year	Tournament	Partner	Opponent	Score	Result
2014	Jaya Raya Junior International	(Indonesia) Frengky Wijaya Putra	(Indonesia) Akbar Bintang Cahyono (Indonesia) Jeka Wiratama	21–15, 21–14	(gold) Winner
2014	Singapore Youth International	(Indonesia) Frengky Wijaya Putra	(Indonesia) Alwi Mahardika (Indonesia) Giovani Dicky Oktavan	21–15, 17–21, 18–21	(silver) Runner-up

BWF Junior International Grand Prix tournament
BWF Junior International Challenge tournament
BWF Junior International Series tournament
BWF Junior Future Series tournament

== Performance timeline ==
Key

W	Won	F	Finalist	SF	Semi-finalist
QF	Quarter-finalist	#R	Rounds 4, 3, 2, 1	RR	Round-robin stage
Q#	Qualification round	A	Absent	w/d	Withdrew
G	Gold	S	Silver	B	Bronze
NH	Not held	N/A	Not applicable	DNQ	Did not qualify

=== National team ===
- Senior level

Team event	2019	2020	2021	2022	2023	2024	2025	2026	Ref
SEA Games	A	NH	A	NH	A	NH	G	NH	
Thomas Cup	NH	A	NH	A	NH	A	NH	GS	
Asia Mixed Team Championships	B	NH			A	NH	A	NH	

=== Individual competitions ===
- Senior level

Events	2025	2026	Ref
SEA Games	G	NH	
Asian Championships	1R	2R	
World Championships	2R	3R	

Tournament	BWF Superseries / Grand Prix		BWF World Tour									Best	Ref
Tournament	2016	2017	2018	2019	2020	2021	2022	2023	2024	2025	2026	Best	Ref
Malaysia Open	A				NH		A			2R	QF	QF ('26)	
India Open	A				NH		A				2R	2R ('26)	
Indonesia Masters	Q2	NH	1R	A	NH	2R	2R	2R	QF	1R	SF	SF ('26)	
Thailand Masters	A			2R	1R	NH		1R	1R	A		2R ('19)	
German Open	A			1R	NH		A					1R ('19)	
All England Open	A									SF	1R	SF ('25)	
Swiss Open	A				NH	A			SF	QF	A	SF ('24)	
Ruichang China Masters	N/A		A	QF	NH			A				QF ('19)	
Orléans Masters	N/A		QF	A	NH	SF	A		F	A		F ('24)	
Thailand Open	Q2	A	1R	1R	A	NH	1R	QF	1R	QF	w/d	QF ('23, '25)	
Malaysia Masters	A	1R	A	1R	A	NH	A	Q1	1R	A		1R ('17, '19, '24)	
Singapore Open	A				NH		SF	A	2R	2R	2R	SF ('22)	
Indonesia Open	A	Q2	A		NH	1R	1R	A	SF	F	SF	F ('25)	
Australian Open	A		2R	A	NH		2R	1R	A	SF	F	F ('26)	
Macau Open	A		1R	A	NH				F	F	A	F ('24, '25)	
Japan Open	A				NH		A		2R	1R	2R	2R ('24, '26)	
China Open	A				NH			A	1R	2R	2R	2R ('25, '26)	
Chinese Taipei Open	A			2R	NH		A					2R ('19)	
Korea Masters	A		2R	A	NH		A		2R	A		2R ('18, '24)	
China Masters	A	1R	A		NH			A	F	1R	QF	F ('24)	
Indonesia Masters Super 100	NH		A	1R	NH		A	W	A			W ('23)	
Indonesia Masters Super 100	NH		A	1R	NH		A	2R	A			W ('23)	
Vietnam Open	A			2R	NH		SF	2R	A			SF ('22)	
Malaysia Super 100	NH							QF	A			QF ('23)	
Denmark Open	A									2R	1R	2R ('25)	
French Open	A				NH	A				QF	1R	QF ('25)	
Hylo Open	A									F	2R	F ('25)	
Japan Masters	NH							A	2R	A	1R	2R ('24)	
Hong Kong Open	A				NH			A	F	QF	1R	F ('24)	
Syed Modi International	A		QF	A	NH		A					QF ('18)	
Superseries / World Tour Finals	DNQ								SF	SF	DNQ	SF ('24, '25)	
Akita Masters	NH		w/d	A	NH							—	
New Zealand Open	A		2R	1R	NH							2R ('18)	
Spain Masters	NH		A	2R	A	F	NH	A	W	NH		W ('24)	
Year-end ranking	151	65	45	56	87	92	60	48	11	8		7	
Tournament	2016	2017	2018	2019	2020	2021	2022	2023	2024	2025	2026	Best	Ref
