= Adidas Arena =

Multi-use domed stadium near Paris

- The arena in June 2026
- Interactive map of Adidas Arena
- Former names: Paris Arena II; Porte de La Chapelle Arena (2020–2022, 2024)
- Address: 58 Boulevard Ney
- Location: Paris, Île-de-France, France
- Coordinates: 48.89959°N 2.36075°E
- Owner: City of Paris
- Operator: Paris Entertainment Company
- Capacity: 8,000 (sport); 9,000 (concerts)

Construction
- Groundbreaking: March 2020
- Opened: 11 February 2024
- Cost: €125 million
- Architects: SCAU; NP2F
- Structural engineer: Bollinger+Grohmann
- Main contractor: Bouygues Construction

Tenant
- Paris Basketball (2024–present)

Website
- adidasarena.com

The Adidas Arena (also known by its project name Paris Arena II) is a multi-purpose and modular hall located in La Chapelle neighborhood of Paris (18th arrondissement), France.

The arena has a capacity of 8,000 seats for sporting events and 9,000 seats for concerts and shows, as well as two gymnasiums which will be for use by local clubs and residents. Under construction since the beginning of March 2020, it was expected to be completed by the spring of 2024 and was inaugurated on 11 February 2024 during the LNB Élite basketball match between Paris and Saint-Quentin, won 87 to 65 by Paris.

== Usage ==
It was originally intended to host the wrestling events and men's preliminary basketball tournament of the 2024 Summer Olympics, before hosting the Paralympic table tennis tournament. Eventually, the Olympic events of badminton then rhythmic gymnastics take place there, followed by para badminton and powerlifting. As soon as the arena was built, it became the home court of Paris Basketball and PSG Handball for their larger games. It also hosted the quarter-finals and semi-finals of the 2024 League of Legends World Championship in esports. The following year it hosted the 2025 BWF Badminton World Championships. The following year, it was announced that All Elite Wrestling will host Grand Slam: France on October 6. The venue will host matches during the 2031 FIBA Basketball World Cup.

For Entertainment events, on 14 April 2024, French rapper La Fève performed the first concert at the arena. American singer-songwriter Madison Beer was the first international artist to perform in this arena during The Locket Tour on 22 May 2026. English singer FKA Twigs performed a concert in this arena during the Body High Tour on 8 June 2026.

== Naming rights ==
The construction carried the project name "Paris Arena II". In July 2022, it was announced that the arena will receive the sponsor name Adidas Arena, after the German sporting goods manufacturer Adidas. Adidas signed a deal with the operating company SAE POPB, which also manages the Accor Arena and the Bataclan theatre. The agreement runs for five years with a possible seven-year extension. Adidas pays 2.8 million euros annually. Activists urged the arena should be named in honour of Alice Milliat (1884–1957), a French athlete, sports official and campaigner for women's rights. She organized the first Women's World Games in Paris. In early July 2022, the Paris City Council approved the sponsor's name change by a vote of 33 to 17, with 26 abstentions. Shortly before, the city council decided that the future esplanade in front of the arena will be given the name of Alice Milliat.

== See also ==
- Venues of the 2024 Summer Olympics and Paralympics
- List of indoor arenas in France
