= 2026 German Open (badminton) =

Badminton tournament in Germany

Tournament details
- Dates: 24 February – 1 March
- Edition: 67th
- Level: Super 300
- Total prize money: US$250,000
- Venue: Westenergie Sporthalle
- Location: Mülheim, Germany

Champions
- Men's singles: (France) Christo Popov
- Women's singles: (China) Han Qianxi
- Men's doubles: (China) Chen Boyang (China) Liu Yi
- Women's doubles: (China) Bao Lijing (China) Luo Xumin
- Mixed doubles: (China) Cheng Xing (China) Zhang Chi

The 2026 German Open (officially known as the Yonex German Open 2026 for sponsorship reasons), was a badminton tournament that took place at the Westenergie Sporthalle, Mülheim, Germany, from 24 February to 1 March 2026 and had a total prize of US$250,000.

== Tournament ==
The 2026 German Open was the fifth tournament of the 2026 BWF World Tour and was part of the German Open championships, which have been held since 1955. This tournament was organized by Vermarktungsgesellschaft Badminton Deutschland (VBD) mbH for the German Badminton Association with sanction from the BWF.

=== Venue ===
This tournament was held at the Westenergie Sporthalle in Mülheim, Germany.

=== Point distribution ===
Below is the point distribution for each phase of the tournament based on the BWF points system for the BWF World Tour Super 300 event.

Winner	Runner-up	3/4	5/8	9/16	17/32	33/64	65/128
7,000	5,950	4,900	3,850	2,750	1,670	660	320

=== Prize pool ===
The total prize money is US$250,000 with the distribution of the prize money in accordance with BWF regulations.

Event	Winner	Finalist	Semi-finals	Quarter-finals	Last 16
Singles	$18,750	$9,500	$3,625	$1,500	$875
Doubles	$19,750	$9,500	$3,500	$1,812.50	$937.50

== Men's singles ==
=== Seeds ===
1. (France) Christo Popov (champion)
2. (China) Li Shifeng (first round)
3. (Chinese Taipei) Chou Tien-chen (first round)
4. (Chinese Taipei) Lin Chun-yi (semi-finals)
5. (China) Weng Hongyang (quarter-finals)
6. (France) Toma Junior Popov (final)
7. (China) Lu Guangzu (second round)
8. (Chinese Taipei) Chi Yu-jen (semi-finals)

=== Finals ===
Semi-finals
1	(France) Christo Popov	21	18	21
4	(Chinese Taipei) Lin Chun-yi	10	21	18
8	(Chinese Taipei) Chi Yu-jen	19	15
6	(France) Toma Junior Popov	21	21

Final
1	(France) Christo Popov	21	21
6	(France) Toma Junior Popov	16	15

=== Top half ===
==== Section 1 ====
First round
1	(France) C Popov	21	22
(India) K George	10	20
(Belgium) J Carraggi	17	13
(Hong Kong) J Gunawan	21	21
7	(China) Lu GZ	15	21	21
(Chinese Taipei) Su L-y	21	10	19
(Chinese Taipei) Liao J-f	10	10
(Hong Kong) Ng K L	21	21

Second round
1	(France) C Popov	21	21
(Hong Kong) J Gunawan	19	15
7	(China) Lu GZ	17	12
(Hong Kong) Ng K L	21	21

Quarter-finals
1	(France) C Popov	21	21
(Hong Kong) Ng K L	18	17

==== Section 2 ====
First round
4	(Chinese Taipei) Lin C-y	17	21	21
(England) H Huang	21	11	18
Q2	(Poland) M Szymanowski	12	11
(India) S Kidambi	21	21
5	(China) Weng HY	23	21
(Finland) J Oldorff	21	8
WC	(Germany) M Kicklitz	23	11	21
(Finland) K Koljonen	21	21	4

Second round
4	(Chinese Taipei) Lin C-y	21	21
(India) S Kidambi	14	9
5	(China) Weng HY	21	21
WC	(Germany) M Kicklitz	15	12

Quarter-finals
4	(Chinese Taipei) Lin C-y	12	22	21
5	(China) Weng HY	21	20	18

=== Bottom half ===
==== Section 3 ====
First round
(Chinese Taipei) Lee C-h	15	12
Q3	(Denmark) D J Holm	21	21
(Malaysia) Leong J H	21	5	20
8	(Chinese Taipei) Chi Y-j	18	21	22
(Thailand) K Wangcharoen	21	21
Q4	(Denmark) J Houe	16	15
(Republic of Ireland) N Nguyen	21	11	21
3	(Chinese Taipei) Chou T-c	11	21	16

Second round
Q3	(Denmark) D J Holm	18	16
8	(Chinese Taipei) Chi Y-j	21	21
(Thailand) K Wangcharoen	17	14
(Republic of Ireland) N Nguyen	21	21

Quarter-finals
8	(Chinese Taipei) Chi Y-j	21	21
(Republic of Ireland) N Nguyen	18	15

==== Section 4 ====
First round
(Chinese Taipei) Wang T-w	21	21
(India) T Mannepalli	18	18
(Croatia) A Dinata	21	13	14
6	(France) T J Popov	17	21	21
(Hong Kong) Lee C Y	21	12	21
(Malaysia) J Hoh	17	21	8
Q1	(Japan) M Koga	21	21
2	(China) Li SF	16	15

Second round
(Chinese Taipei) Wang T-w	10	21
6	(France) T J Popov	21	23
(Hong Kong) Lee C Y	18	11
Q1	(Japan) M Koga	21	21

Quarter-finals
6	(France) T J Popov	21	19	21
Q1	(Japan) M Koga	13	21	19

== Women's singles ==
=== Seeds ===
1. (China) Wang Zhiyi (final)
2. (China) Han Yue (semi-finals)
3. (Thailand) Pornpawee Chochuwong (second round)
4. (Japan) Tomoka Miyazaki (semi-finals)
5. (Chinese Taipei) Chiu Pin-chian (quarter-finals)
6. (Thailand) Busanan Ongbamrungphan (second round)
7. (Denmark) Mia Blichfeldt (withdrew)
8. (Denmark) Line Kjærsfeldt (withdrew)

=== Finals ===
Semi-finals
1	(China) Wang Zhiyi	21	21
4	(Japan) Tomoka Miyazaki	10	18
(China) Han Qianxi	w	/	o
2	(China) Han Yue

Final
1	(China) Wang Zhiyi	19	20
(China) Han Qianxi	21	22

=== Top half ===
==== Section 1 ====
First round
1	(China) Wang ZY	21	21
(India) T Mir	9	14
Q1	(Czech Republic) T Švábíková	19	17
(Denmark) A Schulz	21	21
SWM	(United States) B Zhang	19	21	21
(India) M Bansod	21	9	19
(India) R Ramraj	18	23	16
(Denmark) L Christophersen	21	21	21

Second round
1	(China) Wang ZY	21	21
(Denmark) A Schulz	9	14
SWM	(United States) B Zhang
(Denmark) L Christophersen	w	/	o

Quarter-finals
1	(China) Wang ZY	21	21
(Denmark) L Christophersen	14	19

==== Section 2 ====
First round
4	(Japan) T Miyazaki	21	15	21
(Malaysia) Letshanaa K	9	21	11
(Scotland) K Gilmour	21	21
PFQ	(Chinese Taipei) Chen S-y	7	13
6	(Thailand) B Ongbamrungphan	18	21	21
(Chinese Taipei) Hsu W-c	21	9	14
(Ukraine) P Buhrova	13	18
PFQ	(Bulgaria) K Nalbantova	21	21

Second round
4	(Japan) T Miyazaki	21	13
(Scotland) K Gilmour	19	9^{r}
6	(Thailand) B Ongbamrungphan	16	12
PFQ	(Bulgaria) K Nalbantova	21	21

Quarter-finals
4	(Japan) T Miyazaki	18	21	21
PFQ	(Bulgaria) K Nalbantova	21	18	15

=== Bottom half ===
==== Section 3 ====
First round
(Singapore) Yeo J M	21	21
(Denmark) J D Jakobsen	16	15
(China) Han QX	21	19	21
SWM	(Chinese Taipei) Lin H-t	19	21	18
(Malaysia) Wong L C	21	17	21
(India) T Sharma	19	21	16
(India) I Baruah	15	18
3	(Thailand) P Chochuwong	21	21

Second round
(Singapore) Yeo J M	22	9	11
(China) Han QX	20	21	21
(Malaysia) Wong L C	21	21
3	(Thailand) P Chochuwong	14	19

Quarter-finals
(China) Han QX	21	21
(Malaysia) Wong L C	16	13

==== Section 4 ====
First round
Q2	(Spain) C Azurmendi	20	21	17
PFQ	(Chinese Taipei) Pai Y-p	22	13	21
(Chinese Taipei) Sung S-y	14	9
5	(Chinese Taipei) Chiu P-c	21	21
(Chinese Taipei) Huang Y-h	21	21
Q4	(India) A Kashyap	13	17
Q3	(Germany) M Wilson	11	10
2	(China) Han Y	21	21

Second round
PFQ	(Chinese Taipei) Pai Y-p	11	11
5	(Chinese Taipei) Chiu P-c	21	21
(Chinese Taipei) Huang Y-h	19	19
2	(China) Han Y	21	21

Quarter-finals
5	(Chinese Taipei) Chiu P-c	26	21	10
2	(China) Han Y	24	23	21

== Men's doubles ==
=== Seeds ===
1. (Malaysia) Aaron Chia / Soh Wooi Yik (second round)
2. (China) Liang Weikeng / Wang Chang (semi-finals)
3. (Malaysia) Goh Sze Fei / Nur Izzuddin (quarter-finals)
4. (Denmark) Kim Astrup / Anders Skaarup Rasmussen (quarter-finals)
5. (Chinese Taipei) Chiu Hsiang-chieh / Wang Chi-lin (semi-finals)
6. (China) Chen Boyang / Liu Yi (champions)
7. (Chinese Taipei) Lee Jhe-huei / Yang Po-hsuan (second round)
8. (Malaysia) Junaidi Arif / Yap Roy King (second round)

=== Finals ===
Semi-finals
Q2	(France) Julien Maio (France) William Villeger	21	21
5	(Chinese Taipei) Chiu Hsiang-chieh (Chinese Taipei) Wang Chi-lin	17	18
6	(China) Chen Boyang (China) Liu Yi	21	21
2	(China) Liang Weikeng (China) Wang Chang	15	12

Final
Q2	(France) Julien Maio (France) William Villeger	21	15	12
6	(China) Chen Boyang (China) Liu Yi	17	21	21

=== Top half ===
==== Section 1 ====
First round
1	(Malaysia) A Chia (Malaysia) Soh W Y	21	25
(Denmark) W K Boe (Denmark) A Søndergaard	16	23
(Chinese Taipei) Chen C-k (Chinese Taipei) Lin B-w	22	16	17
Q2	(France) J Maio (France) W Villeger	20	21	21
8	(Malaysia) J Arif (Malaysia) Yap R K	21	21
(England) O Butler (England) S Jones	14	12
(Chinese Taipei) Lee F-c (Chinese Taipei) Lee F-j	23	21
(France) É Adam (France) L Rossi	21	14

Second round
1	(Malaysia) A Chia (Malaysia) Soh W Y	15	22
Q2	(France) J Maio (France) W Villeger	21	24
8	(Malaysia) J Arif (Malaysia) Yap R K	19	21	18
(Chinese Taipei) Lee F-c (Chinese Taipei) Lee F-j	21	8	21

Quarter-finals
Q2	(France) J Maio (France) W Villeger	13	21	22
(Chinese Taipei) Lee F-c (Chinese Taipei) Lee F-j	21	12	20

==== Section 2 ====
First round
3	(Malaysia) Goh S F (Malaysia) N Izzuddin	21	21
(France) M Cattoen (France) L Renoir	17	19
Q4	(Singapore) D Wee (Singapore) H Wong	15	14
(Malaysia) Ong Y S (Malaysia) Teo E Y	21	21
5	(Chinese Taipei) Chiu H-c (Chinese Taipei) Wang C-l	21	21
(Scotland) A Dunn (Scotland) A Pringle	13	11
(Chinese Taipei) Chen Z-r (Chinese Taipei) Lin Y-c	21	21
(Denmark) D Lundgaard (Denmark) M Vestergaard	17	17

Second round
3	(Malaysia) Goh S F (Malaysia) N Izzuddin	21	21
(Malaysia) Ong Y S (Malaysia) Teo E Y	18	14
5	(Chinese Taipei) Chiu H-c (Chinese Taipei) Wang C-l	25	23	21
(Chinese Taipei) Chen Z-r (Chinese Taipei) Lin Y-c	27	21	15

Quarter-finals
3	(Malaysia) Goh S F (Malaysia) N Izzuddin	21	16	18
5	(Chinese Taipei) Chiu H-c (Chinese Taipei) Wang C-l	16	21	21

=== Bottom half ===
==== Section 3 ====
First round
(Individual Neutral Athletes) R Alimov (Individual Neutral Athletes) M Ogloblin	15	15
(Singapore) W Koh (Singapore) J Kubo	21	21
Q3	(England) A Green (England) Z Russ	10	11
6	(China) Chen BY (China) Liu Y	21	21
(United States) Chen Z-y (United States) P Smith	19	21	21
(United Arab Emirates) De Ayyappan (United Arab Emirates) Dh Ayyappan	21	15	14
(Germany) B Geiss (Germany) J R Jansen	17	10
4	(Denmark) K Astrup (Denmark) A S Rasmussen	21	21

Second round
(Singapore) W Koh (Singapore) J Kubo	11	14
6	(China) Chen BY (China) Liu Y	21	21
(United States) Chen Z-y (United States) P Smith	18	21	24
4	(Denmark) K Astrup (Denmark) A S Rasmussen	21	12	26

Quarter-finals
6	(China) Chen BY (China) Liu Y	21	21
4	(Denmark) K Astrup (Denmark) A S Rasmussen	13	12

==== Section 4 ====
First round
(Czech Republic) J Král (Czech Republic) O Král	21	21
Q1	(Germany) M Bourakkadi (Germany) K Neumann	19	13
(Scotland) C Grimley (Scotland) M Grimley	16	15
7	(Chinese Taipei) Lee J-h (Chinese Taipei) Yang P-h	21	21
(Denmark) C F Kjær (Denmark) R Kjær	17	19
(France) C Popov (France) T J Popov	21	21
(Malaysia) Choong H J (Malaysia) M Haikal	14	21	18
2	(China) Liang WK (China) Wang C	21	18	21

Second round
(Czech Republic) J Král (Czech Republic) O Král	18
7	(Chinese Taipei) Lee J-h (Chinese Taipei) Yang P-h	18^{r}
(France) C Popov (France) T J Popov	21	14	19
2	(China) Liang WK (China) Wang C	18	21	21

Quarter-finals
(Czech Republic) J Král (Czech Republic) O Král	17	14
2	(China) Liang WK (China) Wang C	21	21

== Women's doubles ==
=== Seeds ===
1. (Bulgaria) Gabriela Stoeva / Stefani Stoeva (quarter-finals)
2. (Chinese Taipei) Hsu Yin-hui / Lin Jhih-yun (second round)
3. (Chinese Taipei) Hsu Ya-ching / Sung Yu-hsuan (semi-finals)
4. (Hong Kong) Yeung Nga Ting / Yeung Pui Lam (first round)
5. (Japan) Kaho Osawa / Mai Tanabe (quarter-finals)
6. (Chinese Taipei) Chang Ching-hui / Yang Ching-tun (quarter-finals)
7. (France) Margot Lambert / Camille Pognante (first round)
8. (China) Bao Lijing / Luo Xumin (champions)

=== Finals ===
Semi-finals
8	(China) Bao Lijing (China) Luo Xumin	21	21
3	(Chinese Taipei) Hsu Ya-ching (Chinese Taipei) Sung Yu-hsuan	13	11
(China) Li Yijing (China) Wang Yiduo	21	8	21
(Indonesia) Amallia Cahaya Pratiwi (Indonesia) Siti Fadia Silva Ramadhanti	18	21	19

Final
8	(China) Bao Lijing (China) Luo Xumin	21	21
(China) Li Yijing (China) Wang Yiduo	16	16

=== Top half ===
==== Section 1 ====
First round
1	(Bulgaria) G Stoeva (Bulgaria) S Stoeva	21	21
(United States) F Corbett (United States) J Gai	18	15
(Scotland) J MacPherson (Scotland) C Torrance	19	19
Q1	(Netherlands) K de Wit (Netherlands) M Loos	21	21
8	(China) Bao LJ (China) Luo XM	21	21
(Chinese Taipei) Chen Y-f (Chinese Taipei) Sun L-c	10	12
(Switzerland) L Amiguet (Switzerland) C Racloz	19	12
(Ukraine) P Buhrova (Ukraine) Y Kantemyr	21	21

Second round
1	(Bulgaria) G Stoeva (Bulgaria) S Stoeva	21	21
Q1	(Netherlands) K de Wit (Netherlands) M Loos	7	11
8	(China) Bao LJ (China) Luo XM	21	21
(Ukraine) P Buhrova (Ukraine) Y Kantemyr	8	11

Quarter-finals
1	(Bulgaria) G Stoeva (Bulgaria) S Stoeva	10	18
8	(China) Bao LJ (China) Luo XM	21	21

==== Section 2 ====
First round
3	(Chinese Taipei) Hsu Y-c (Chinese Taipei) Sung Y-h	15
(Poland) P Cybulska (Poland) K Marczak	9^{r}
Q2	(Switzerland) A Müller (Netherlands) K van Buiten	15	9
(Chinese Taipei) Hu L-f (Chinese Taipei) Jheng Y-c	21	21
6	(Chinese Taipei) Chang C-h (Chinese Taipei) Yang C-t	21	21
(Thailand) O Jongsathapornpan (Thailand) S S Wedler	13	16
(Germany) S Hübsch (Germany) A Lehmann	10	12
(Chinese Taipei) Chen S-y (Chinese Taipei) Lee Y-h	21	21

Second round
3	(Chinese Taipei) Hsu Y-c (Chinese Taipei) Sung Y-h	21	21
(Chinese Taipei) Hu L-f (Chinese Taipei) Jheng Y-c	12	10
6	(Chinese Taipei) Chang C-h (Chinese Taipei) Yang C-t	21	21
(Chinese Taipei) Chen S-y (Chinese Taipei) Lee Y-h	18	17

Quarter-finals
3	(Chinese Taipei) Hsu Y-c (Chinese Taipei) Sung Y-h	20	21	21
6	(Chinese Taipei) Chang C-h (Chinese Taipei) Yang C-t	22	18	19

=== Bottom half ===
==== Section 3 ====
First round
Q4	(United Arab Emirates) M O Khan (United Arab Emirates) T Khan	12	9
(Indonesia) L T Mayasari (Indonesia) A Rahayu	21	21
Q3	(Bulgaria) K Nalbantova (Bulgaria) H Popovska	9	7
5	(Japan) K Osawa (Japan) M Tanabe	21	21
(Spain) N Carulla (Spain) C M Jiménez	16	21	16
(England) L Curtin (England) S Kelly	21	11	21
(China) Li YJ (China) Wang YD	21	21
4	(Hong Kong) Yeung N T (Hong Kong) Yeung P L	12	16

Second round
(Indonesia) L T Mayasari (Indonesia) A Rahayu	13	17
5	(Japan) K Osawa (Japan) M Tanabe	21	21
(England) L Curtin (England) S Kelly	8	4
(China) Li YJ (China) Wang YD	21	21

Quarter-finals
5	(Japan) K Osawa (Japan) M Tanabe	12	9
(China) Li YJ (China) Wang YD	21	21

==== Section 4 ====
First round
(England) A Harris (England) L Tolman	17	21	18
(Denmark) S Pilgaard (Denmark) S Schulz	21	18	21
(Hong Kong) Lui L L (Hong Kong) Tsang H Y	21	21
7	(France) M Lambert (France) C Pognante	19	19
(Indonesia) A C Pratiwi (Indonesia) S F Ramadhanti	21	21
(Denmark) K Vang (Denmark) M Werge	8	14
(India) A Bhat (India) S Gautam	14	21	8
2	(Chinese Taipei) Hsu Y-h (Chinese Taipei) Lin J-y	21	14	21

Second round
(Denmark) S Pilgaard (Denmark) S Schulz	22	16	18
(Hong Kong) Lui L L (Hong Kong) Tsang H Y	20	21	21
(Indonesia) A C Pratiwi (Indonesia) S F Ramadhanti	21	21
2	(Chinese Taipei) Hsu Y-h (Chinese Taipei) Lin J-y	13	14

Quarter-finals
(Hong Kong) Lui L L (Hong Kong) Tsang H Y	15	14
(Indonesia) A C Pratiwi (Indonesia) S F Ramadhanti	21	21

== Mixed doubles ==
=== Seeds ===
1. (China) Feng Yanzhe / Huang Dongping (withdrew)
2. (China) Guo Xinwa / Chen Fanghui (second round)
3. (Hong Kong) Tang Chun Man / Tse Ying Suet (quarter-finals)
4. (Denmark) Mathias Christiansen / Alexandra Bøje (second round)
5. (Malaysia) Goh Soon Huat / Shevon Jemie Lai (quarter- finals)
6. (Chinese Taipei) Ye Hong-wei / Nicole Gonzales Chan (second round)
7. (China) Cheng Xing / Zhang Chi (champions)
8. (Denmark) Mads Vestergaard / Christine Busch (final)

=== Finals ===
Semi-finals
7	(China) Cheng Xing (China) Zhang Chi	22	21
(Chinese Taipei) Yang Po-hsuan (Chinese Taipei) Hu Ling-fang	20	10
(Singapore) Terry Hee (Indonesia) Gloria Emanuelle Widjaja	19	16
8	(Denmark) Mads Vestergaard (Denmark) Christine Busch	21	21

Final
7	(China) Cheng Xing (China) Zhang Chi	21	21
8	(Denmark) Mads Vestergaard (Denmark) Christine Busch	12	17

=== Top half ===
==== Section 1 ====
First round
3	(Hong Kong) Tang C M (Hong Kong) Tse Y S	21	21
(United States) P Smith (United States) J Gai	18	17
(Germany) M Bourakkadi (Germany) L Michalski	19	15
(Chinese Taipei) Chen C-k (Chinese Taipei) Hsu Y-h	21	21
7	(China) Cheng X (China) Zhang C	21	21
(Germany) S Krax (Germany) A Lehmann	12	18
(Denmark) R Espersen (Denmark) A C Kudsk	17	14
(England) C Hemming (England) E van Leeuwen	21	21

Second round
3	(Hong Kong) Tang C M (Hong Kong) Tse Y S	21	21
(Chinese Taipei) Chen C-k (Chinese Taipei) Hsu Y-h	16	16
7	(China) Cheng X (China) Zhang C	21	21
(England) C Hemming (England) E van Leeuwen	15	17

Quarter-finals
3	(Hong Kong) Tang C M (Hong Kong) Tse Y S	13	17
7	(China) Cheng X (China) Zhang C	21	21

==== Section 2 ====
First round
6	(Chinese Taipei) Ye H-w (Chinese Taipei) N G Chan	21	19	21
(Chinese Taipei) Wu G-x (Chinese Taipei) Lee C-h	16	21	10
(Chinese Taipei) Yang P-hs (Chinese Taipei) Hu L-f	21	21
(Czech Republic) O Král (Czech Republic) T Švábíková	13	13
SWM	(Malaysia) J Wong (Malaysia) Lai P J	16	21	21
(Denmark) K Kolding (Denmark) M Werge	21	17	17
(Thailand) S Jomkoh (Thailand) O Jongsathapornparn	19	21	21
(France) N Begga (France) E Jacob	21	19	19

Second round
6	(Chinese Taipei) Ye H-w (Chinese Taipei) N G Chan	21	18	8
(Chinese Taipei) Yang P-hs (Chinese Taipei) Hu L-f	13	21	21
SWM	(Malaysia) J Wong (Malaysia) Lai P J	16	20
(Thailand) S Jomkoh (Thailand) O Jongsathapornpan	21	22

Quarter-finals
(Chinese Taipei) Yang P-hs (Chinese Taipei) Hu L-f	21	12	21
(Thailand) S Jomkoh (Thailand) O Jongsathapornpan	19	21	17

=== Bottom half ===
==== Section 3 ====
First round
PFQ	(Sweden) F Karlborg (Sweden) T Sjöö	21	21
Q3	(England) O Butler (England) A Harris	12	14
Q4	(Netherlands) B Wassink (Netherlands) D Jille	15	8
5	(Malaysia) Goh S H (Malaysia) S J Lai	21	21
Q1	(Switzerland) Y Orteu (Switzerland) C Racloz	8	16
(Singapore) T Hee (Indonesia) G E Widjaja	21	21
Q2	(Netherlands) A Buijk (Netherlands) M Loos	16	14
4	(Denmark) M Christiansen (Denmark) A Bøje	21	21

Second round
PFQ	(Sweden) F Karlborg (Sweden) T Sjöö	18	11
5	(Malaysia) Goh S H (Malaysia) S J Lai	21	21
(Singapore) T Hee (Indonesia) G E Widjaja	21	15	21
4	(Denmark) M Christiansen (Denmark) A Bøje	19	21	11

Quarter-finals
5	(Malaysia) Goh S H (Malaysia) S J Lai	17	13
(Singapore) T Hee (Indonesia) G E Widjaja	21	21

==== Section 4 ====
First round
(United States) Chen Z-y (United States) F Corbett	16	21	21
(England) S Jones (England) L Tolman	21	15	16
PFQ	(Bulgaria) E Panev (Bulgaria) G Stoeva	16	12
8	(Denmark) M Vestergaard (Denmark) C Busch	21	21
(Ukraine) O Titov (Ukraine) Y Kantemyr	8	10
(Scotland) A Dunn (Scotland) J MacPherson	21	21
(Spain) R Garcia (Spain) L Rodríguez	17	13
2	(China) Guo XW (China) Chen FH	21	21

Second round
(United States) Chen Z-y (United States) F Corbett	7	17
8	(Denmark) M Vestergaard (Denmark) C Busch	21	21
(Scotland) A Dunn (Scotland) J MacPherson	21	21
2	(China) Guo XW (China) Chen FH	9	17

Quarter-finals
8	(Denmark) M Vestergaard (Denmark) C Busch	21	21
(Scotland) A Dunn (Scotland) J MacPherson	11	18

Preceded by 2026 Thailand Masters	BWF World Tour; 2026 BWF season	Succeeded by 2026 All England Open
