= 2026 Singapore Open (badminton) =

2026 badminton tournament in Singapore

Tournament details
- Dates: 26–31 May
- Edition: 75th
- Level: Super 750
- Total prize money: US$1,000,000
- Venue: Singapore Indoor Stadium
- Location: Kallang, Singapore

Champions
- Men's singles: (France) Alex Lanier
- Women's singles: (South Korea) An Se-young
- Men's doubles: (India) Satwiksairaj Rankireddy (India) Chirag Shetty
- Women's doubles: (China) Jia Yifan (China) Zhang Shuxian
- Mixed doubles: (Denmark) Mathias Christiansen (Denmark) Alexandra Bøje

The 2026 Singapore Open (officially known as the KFF Singapore Badminton Open 2026 for sponsorship reasons) was a badminton tournament that took place at Singapore Indoor Stadium in Singapore from 26 to 31 May 2026 and had a total purse of $1,000,000.

== Tournament ==
The 2026 Singapore Open was the thirteenth tournament of the 2026 BWF World Tour and also part of the Singapore Open championships, which have been held since 1929. This tournament is organized by the Singapore Badminton Association with sanction from the BWF.

=== Venue ===
This international tournament was held at Singapore Indoor Stadium in Singapore.

=== Point distribution ===
Below was the point distribution table for each phase of the tournament based on the BWF points system for the BWF World Tour Super 750 event.

Winner	Runner-up	3/4	5/8	9/16	17/32
11,000	9,350	7,700	6,050	4,320	2,660

=== Prize pool ===
The total prize money is US$1,000,000 with the distribution of the prize money in accordance with BWF regulations.

Event	Winner	Finalist	Semi-finals	Quarter-finals	Last 16	Last 32
Singles	$70,000	$34,000	$14,000	$5,500	$3,000	$1,000
Doubles	$74,000	$35,000	$14,000	$6,250	$3,250	$1,000

== Men's singles ==
=== Seeds ===
1. (China) Shi Yuqi (second round)
2. (Thailand) Kunlavut Vitidsarn (second round)
3. (Denmark) Anders Antonsen (quarter-finals)
4. (France) Christo Popov (second round)
5. (Indonesia) Jonatan Christie (first round)
6. (Chinese Taipei) Chou Tien-chen (first round)
7. (China) Li Shifeng (first round)
8. (Chinese Taipei) Lin Chun-yi (first round)

=== Finals ===
Semi-finals
(Indonesia) Alwi Farhan	14	11
(France) Alex Lanier	21	21
(Singapore) Loh Kean Yew	21	15	21
(Japan) Koki Watanabe	15	21	9

Final
(France) Alex Lanier	17	21	21
(Singapore) Loh Kean Yew	21	15	14

=== Top half ===
==== Section 1 ====
First round
1	(China) Shi YQ	21	21
(Japan) K Nishimoto	17	18
(France) T J Popov	19	14
(Indonesia) A Farhan	21	21
6	(Chinese Taipei) Chou T-c	19	16
(Japan) K Naraoka	21	21
(Malaysia) Leong J H	21	20	8
(Chinese Taipei) Lee C-h	18	22	21

Second round
1	(China) Shi YQ	16	21	14
(Indonesia) A Farhan	21	19	21
(Japan) K Naraoka	21	21
(Chinese Taipei) Lee C-h	13	12

Quarter-finals
(Indonesia) A Farhan	21	21
(Japan) K Naraoka	12	17

==== Section 2 ====
First round
3	(Denmark) A Antonsen	21	21
(Japan) Y Tanaka	13	14
(Canada) V Lai	11	21	21
(India) A Shetty	21	14	12
7	(China) Li SF	17	14
(China) Weng HY	21	21
(Canada) B Yang	15	19
(France) A Lanier	21	21

Second round
3	(Denmark) A Antonsen	27	21
(Canada) V Lai	25	15
(China) Weng HY	16	13
(France) A Lanier	21	21

Quarter-finals
3	(Denmark) A Antonsen	21	16	16
(France) A Lanier	14	21	21

=== Bottom half ===
==== Section 3 ====
First round
(India) S Kidambi	20	21	17
(Singapore) Loh K Y	22	19	21
(India) Prannoy H. S.	10	21	21
5	(Indonesia) J Christie	21	12	18
(Chinese Taipei) Chi Y-j	21	21
(Singapore) J Teh	19	15
(Malaysia) J Hoh	21	18	14
4	(France) C Popov	13	21	21

Second round
(Singapore) Loh K Y	21	16	21
(India) Prannoy H. S.	18	21	15
(Chinese Taipei) Chi Y-j	20	21	23
4	(France) C Popov	22	19	21

Quarter-finals
(Singapore) Loh K Y	16	21	21
(Chinese Taipei) Chi Y-j	21	6	8

==== Section 4 ====
First round
(Japan) K Watanabe	21	21
(Chinese Taipei) Wang T-w	17	13
(Hong Kong) Lee C Y	13	21	21
8	(Chinese Taipei) Lin C-y	21	13	19
(China) Lu GZ	17	15
(India) L Sen	21	21
PFR	(Belgium) J Carraggi	8	18
2	(Thailand) K Vitidsarn	21	21

Second round
(Japan) K Watanabe	21	21
(Hong Kong) Lee C Y	17	12
(India) L Sen	2
2	(Thailand) K Vitidsarn	0^{r}

Quarter-finals
(Japan) K Watanabe	21	15	21
(India) L Sen	19	21	15

== Women's singles ==
=== Seeds ===
1. (South Korea) An Se-young (champion)
2. (China) Wang Zhiyi (semi-finals)
3. (Japan) Akane Yamaguchi (final)
4. (China) Chen Yufei (semi-finals)
5. (Indonesia) Putri Kusuma Wardani (first round)
6. (Thailand) Ratchanok Intanon (quarter-finals)
7. (Thailand) Pornpawee Chochuwong (quarter-finals)
8. (Japan) Tomoka Miyazaki (quarter-finals)

=== Finals ===
Semi-finals
1	(South Korea) An Se-young	20	21	21
4	(China) Chen Yufei	22	12	15
3	(Japan) Akane Yamaguchi	21	17	21
2	(China) Wang Zhiyi	13	21	15

Final
1	(South Korea) An Se-young	21	17	21
3	(Japan) Akane Yamaguchi	11	21	19

=== Top half ===
==== Section 1 ====
First round
1	(South Korea) An S-y	21	21
(South Korea) Sim Y-j	12	3
(Chinese Taipei) Sung S-y	21	21
(Turkey) N Arın	9	16
5	(Indonesia) P K Wardani	17	18
(India) P. V. Sindhu	21	21
PFR	(Malaysia) Wong L C	20	17
(Japan) R Gunji	22	21

Second round
1	(South Korea) An S-y	21	21
(Chinese Taipei) Sung S-y	8	6
(India) P. V. Sindhu	21	21
(Japan) R Gunji	9	12

Quarter-finals
1	(South Korea) An S-y	21	21
(India) P. V. Sindhu	17	14

==== Section 2 ====
First round
4	(China) Chen YF	19	21	21
(Malaysia) Letshanaa K	21	15	17
(Japan) H Akechi	20	25	21
(Thailand) B Ongbamrungphan	22	23	17
8	(Japan) T Miyazaki	21	21
(India) U Hooda	14	10
(Chinese Taipei) Huang Y-h	15	13
(Chinese Taipei) Chiu P-c	21	21

Second round
4	(China) Chen YF	16	21	21
(Japan) H Akechi	21	5	18
8	(Japan) T Miyazaki	21	23
(Chinese Taipei) Chiu P-c	11	21

Quarter-finals
4	(China) Chen YF	17	21	21
8	(Japan) T Miyazaki	21	17	8

=== Bottom half ===
==== Section 3 ====
First round
(Japan) N Nidaira	21	21
(Vietnam) Nguyễn T L	17	12
(Scotland) K Gilmour	14	19
6	(Thailand) R Intanon	21	21
(Canada) M Li	21	22
(Denmark) L Kjærsfeldt	13	20
(Singapore) Yeo J M	16	11
3	(Japan) A Yamaguchi	21	21

Second round
(Japan) N Nidaira	10	16
6	(Thailand) R Intanon	21	21
(Canada) M Li	14	6
3	(Japan) A Yamaguchi	21	21

Quarter-finals
6	(Thailand) R Intanon	21	19	20
3	(Japan) A Yamaguchi	19	21	22

==== Section 4 ====
First round
(India) M Bansod	21	19	12
(Chinese Taipei) Lin H-t	11	21	21
(South Korea) Kim G-e	9	21
7	(Thailand) P Chochuwong	21	23
(Denmark) L Christophersen	23	21
(Japan) N Okuhara	21	18
(Thailand) S Katethong	6^{r}
2	(China) Wang ZY	11

Second round
(Chinese Taipei) Lin H-t	15	16
7	(Thailand) P Chochuwong	21	21
(Denmark) L Christophersen	16	20
2	(China) Wang ZY	21	22

Quarter-finals
7	(Thailand) P Chochuwong	11	21	13
2	(China) Wang ZY	21	9	21

== Men's doubles ==
=== Seeds ===
1. (South Korea) Kim Won-ho / Seo Seung-jae (semi-finals)
2. (Malaysia) Aaron Chia / Soh Wooi Yik (quarter-finals)
3. (Indonesia) Fajar Alfian / Muhammad Shohibul Fikri (final)
4. (India) Satwiksairaj Rankireddy / Chirag Shetty (champions)
5. (China) Liang Weikeng / Wang Chang (semi-finals)
6. (Indonesia) Sabar Karyaman Gutama / Muhammad Reza Pahlevi Isfahani (second round)
7. (Japan) Takuro Hoki / Yugo Kobayashi (quarter-finals)
8. (Malaysia) Goh Sze Fei / Nur Izzuddin (quarter-finals)

=== Finals ===
Semi-finals
1	(South Korea) Kim Won-ho (South Korea) Seo Seung-jae	19	18
4	(India) Satwiksairaj Rankireddy (India) Chirag Shetty	21	21
3	(Indonesia) Fajar Alfian (Indonesia) Muhammad Shohibul Fikri	23	21
5	(China) Liang Weikeng (China) Wang Chang	21	4

Final
4	(India) Satwiksairaj Rankireddy (India) Chirag Shetty	18	21	21
3	(Indonesia) Fajar Alfian (Indonesia) Muhammad Shohibul Fikri	21	17	16

=== Top half ===
==== Section 1 ====
First round
1	(South Korea) Kim W-h (South Korea) Seo S-j	21	21
(China) Hu KY (China) Lin XY	16	17
(South Korea) Choi S-g (Malaysia) Goh V S	21	18	15
(Chinese Taipei) He Z-w (Chinese Taipei) Huang J-h	14	21	21
7	(Japan) T Hoki (Japan) Y Kobayashi	21	21
(India) H Amsakarunan (India) Arjun M.R.	15	13
(Chinese Taipei) Chiu H-c (Chinese Taipei) Wang C-l	21	19	18
(China) Chen BY (China) Liu Yi	15	21	21

Second round
1	(South Korea) Kim W-h (South Korea) Seo S-j	21	21
(Chinese Taipei) He Z-w (Chinese Taipei) Huang J-h	14	15
7	(Japan) T Hoki (Japan) Y Kobayashi	21	16	21
(China) Chen BY (China) Liu Yi	15	21	16

Quarter-finals
1	(South Korea) Kim W-h (South Korea) Seo S-j	21	21
7	(Japan) T Hoki (Japan) Y Kobayashi	19	18

==== Section 2 ====
First round
4	(India) S Rankireddy (India) C Shetty	26	21	21
(United States) Chen Z-y (United States) P Smith	28	15	13
(Chinese Taipei) Lee J-h (Chinese Taipei) Yang P-h	21	21
(China) Huang D (China) Liu Ya	8	16
6	(Indonesia) S K Gutama (Indonesia) M R P Isfahani	21	21
(Singapore) W Koh (Singapore) J Kubo	14	12
(Malaysia) N M Azriyn A (Malaysia) Tan W K	15	17
(Malaysia) Kang K X (Malaysia) A Tai	21	21

Second round
4	(India) S Rankireddy (India) C Shetty	21	11	21
(Chinese Taipei) Lee J-h (Chinese Taipei) Yang P-h	15	21	18
6	(Indonesia) S K Gutama (Indonesia) M R P Isfahani	19	17
(Malaysia) Kang K X (Malaysia) A Tai	21	21

Quarter-finals
4	(India) S Rankireddy (India) C Shetty	19	21	21
(Malaysia) Kang K X (Malaysia) A Tai	21	17	13

=== Bottom half ===
==== Section 3 ====
First round
(Japan) T Nomura (Japan) Y Shimogami	12	19
(Malaysia) J Arif (Malaysia) Yap R K	21	21
PFR	(Chinese Taipei) Chen C-k (Chinese Taipei) Liu K-h	18	21	19
8	(Malaysia) Goh S F (Malaysia) N Izzuddin	21	10	21
(Denmark) D Lundgaard (Denmark) M Vestergaard	21	21
(Canada) K Lee (Canada) T A Lindeman	14	16
(Chinese Taipei) Lee F-c (Chinese Taipei) Lee F-j	21	17	15
3	(Indonesia) F Alfian (Indonesia) M S Fikri	15	21	21

Second round
(Malaysia) J Arif (Malaysia) Yap R K	21	21	8
8	(Malaysia) Goh S F (Malaysia) N Izzuddin	23	16	21
(Denmark) D Lundgaard (Denmark) M Vestergaard	13	12
3	(Indonesia) F Alfian (Indonesia) M S Fikri	21	21

Quarter-finals
8	(Malaysia) Goh S F (Malaysia) N Izzuddin	18	21	14
3	(Indonesia) F Alfian (Indonesia) M S Fikri	21	10	21

==== Section 4 ====
First round
(South Korea) Kang M-h (South Korea) Ki D-j	21	25
(Czech Republic) J Král (Czech Republic) O Král	15	23
PFR	(Malaysia) Chia W J (Malaysia) Teo E Y	18	19
5	(China) Liang WK (China) Wang C	21	21
(Japan) K Kumagai (Japan) H Nishi	18	14
(England) B Lane (England) S Vendy	21	21
(France) C Popov (France) T J Popov	17	15
2	(Malaysia) A Chia (Malaysia) Soh W Y	21	21

Second round
(South Korea) Kang M-h (South Korea) Ki D-j	21	21	17
5	(China) Liang WK (China) Wang C	23	19	21
(England) B Lane (England) S Vendy	18	16
2	(Malaysia) A Chia (Malaysia) Soh W Y	21	21

Quarter-finals
5	(China) Liang WK (China) Wang C	21	21
2	(Malaysia) A Chia (Malaysia) Soh W Y	15	15

== Women's doubles ==
=== Seeds ===
1. (China) Liu Shengshu / Tan Ning (final)
2. (Malaysia) Pearly Tan / Thinaah Muralitharan (second round)
3. (South Korea) Lee So-hee / Baek Ha-na (semi-finals)
4. (China) Jia Yifan / Zhang Shuxian (champions)
5. (Japan) Yuki Fukushima / Mayu Matsumoto (quarter-finals)
6. (Japan) Kie Nakanishi / Rin Iwanaga (quarter-finals)
7. (Chinese Taipei) Hsieh Pei-shan / Hung En-tzu (first round)
8. (Bulgaria) Gabriela Stoeva / Stefani Stoeva (quarter-finals)

=== Finals ===
Semi-finals
1	(China) Liu Shengshu (China) Tan Ning	21	21
3	(South Korea) Baek Ha-na (South Korea) Lee So-hee	15	10
4	(China) Jia Yifan (China) Zhang Shuxian	21	21
(Japan) Arisa Igarashi (Japan) Chiharu Shida	13	14

Final
1	(China) Liu Shengshu (China) Tan Ning	20	19
4	(China) Jia Yifan (China) Zhang Shuxian	22	21

=== Top half ===
==== Section 1 ====
First round
1	(China) Liu SS (China) Tan N	21	21
(Indonesia) A C Pratiwi (Indonesia) S F S Ramadhanti	15	15
(Japan) R Hirokami (Japan) S Hobara	22	16
(Chinese Taipei) Hsu Y-c (Chinese Taipei) Sung Y-h	24	21
6	(Japan) R Iwanaga (Japan) K Nakanishi	21	21
(Japan) H Suzuki (Japan) N Yamakita	14	14
(Chinese Taipei) Chang C-h (Chinese Taipei) Yang C-t	21	21
(India) A Bhat K (India) S Gautam	16	11

Second round
1	(China) Liu SS (China) Tan N	21	21
(Chinese Taipei) Hsu Y-c (Chinese Taipei) Sung Y-h	7	13
6	(Japan) R Iwanaga (Japan) K Nakanishi	21	21
(Chinese Taipei) Chang C-h (Chinese Taipei) Yang C-t	12	8

Quarter-finals
1	(China) Liu SS (China) Tan N	w	/	o
6	(Japan) R Iwanaga (Japan) K Nakanishi

==== Section 2 ====
First round
3	(South Korea) Baek H-n (South Korea) Lee S-h	21	21
(United States) F Corbett (United States) J Gai	8	16
(Spain) P López (Spain) L Rodríguez	18	21	21
(India) K Selvam (India) S Singhi	21	13	5
5	(Japan) Y Fukushima (Japan) M Matsumoto	21	21
(Japan) K Osawa (Japan) M Tanabe	13	7
(United States) L Lam (United States) A Lee	19	21	21
(Ukraine) P Buhrova (Ukraine) Y Kantemyr	21	9	14

Second round
3	(South Korea) Baek H-n (South Korea) Lee S-h	21	21
(Spain) P López (Spain) L Rodríguez	19	9
5	(Japan) Y Fukushima (Japan) M Matsumoto	17	21	21
(United States) L Lam (United States) A Lee	21	15	14

Quarter-finals
3	(South Korea) Baek H-n (South Korea) Lee S-h	21	21
5	(Japan) Y Fukushima (Japan) M Matsumoto	15	15

=== Bottom half ===
==== Section 3 ====
First round
(India) R Panda (India) S Panda	9	17
(Thailand) P Aiamvareesrisakul (Thailand) S Janpeng	21	21
(Chinese Taipei) Hsu Y-h (Chinese Taipei) Lin J-y	10	8
8	(Bulgaria) G Stoeva (Bulgaria) S Stoeva	21	21
(Turkey) B Erçetin (Turkey) N İnci	21	21
(Malaysia) Chong J Y (Malaysia) V Ng	8	15
(Hong Kong) Yeung N T (Hong Kong) Yeung P L	17	10
4	(China) Jia YF (China) Zhang SX	21	21

Second round
(Thailand) P Aiamvareesrisakul (Thailand) S Janpeng	8	13
8	(Bulgaria) G Stoeva (Bulgaria) S Stoeva	21	21
(Turkey) B Erçetin (Turkey) N İnci	10	6
4	(China) Jia YF (China) Zhang SX	21	21

Quarter-finals
8	(Bulgaria) G Stoeva (Bulgaria) S Stoeva	14	21	13
4	(China) Jia YF (China) Zhang SX	21	16	21

==== Section 4 ====
First round
(Japan) R Hiramoto (Japan) K Ishikawa	21	21
(Hong Kong) Lui L L (Hong Kong) Tsang H Y	15	17
(Japan) A Igarashi (Japan) C Shida	21	21
7	(Chinese Taipei) Hsieh P-s (Chinese Taipei) Hung E-t	13	18
(Thailand) B Aimsaard (Thailand) N Aimsaard	19	21	21
(Canada) J Dent (Canada) C Lai	21	16	17
(Chinese Taipei) Hu L-f (Chinese Taipei) Jheng Y-c	22	16	15
2	(Malaysia) P Tan (Malaysia) Thinaah M	20	21	21

Second round
(Japan) R Hiramoto (Japan) K Ishikawa	20	15
(Japan) A Igarashi (Japan) C Shida	22	21
(Thailand) B Aimsaard (Thailand) N Aimsaard	21	21
2	(Malaysia) P Tan (Malaysia) Thinaah M	16	19

Quarter-finals
(Japan) A Igarashi (Japan) C Shida	21	21
(Thailand) B Aimsaard (Thailand) N Aimsaard	13	18

== Mixed doubles ==
=== Seeds ===
1. (China) Feng Yanzhe / Huang Dongping (first round)
2. (Thailand) Dechapol Puavaranukroh / Supissara Paewsampran (quarter-finals)
3. (Malaysia) Chen Tang Jie / Toh Ee Wei (quarter-finals)
4. (France) Thom Gicquel / Delphine Delrue (second round)
5. (Denmark) Mathias Christiansen / Alexandra Bøje (champions)
6. (China) Guo Xinwa / Chen Fanghui (first round)
7. (Hong Kong) Tang Chun Man / Tse Ying Suet (quarter-finals)
8. (Chinese Taipei) Ye Hong-wei / Nicole Gonzales Chan (first round)

=== Finals ===
Semi-finals
5	(Denmark) Mathias Christiansen (Denmark) Alexandra Bøje	21	21
(China) Gao Jiaxuan (China) Wei Yaxin	11	13
(India) Dhruv Kapila (India) Tanisha Crasto	16	21	13
(Japan) Yuichi Shimogami (Japan) Sayaka Hobara	21	17	21

Final
5	(Denmark) Mathias Christiansen (Denmark) Alexandra Bøje	17	21	21
(Japan) Yuichi Shimogami (Japan) Sayaka Hobara	21	12	12

=== Top half ===
==== Section 1 ====
First round
1	(China) Feng YZ (China) Huang DP	21	16
(Malaysia) J Wong (Malaysia) Cheng S Y	23	21
(India) R Kapoor (India) R Gadde	18	20
(Chinese Taipei) Yang P-h (Chinese Taipei) Hu L-f	21	22
5	(Denmark) M Christiansen (Denmark) A Bøje	21	21
(Japan) A Koga (Japan) N Saito	15	19
(Chinese Taipei) Liu K-h (Chinese Taipei) Hsu Y-h	21	21
(China) Cheng X (China) Zhang C	10	13

Second round
(Malaysia) J Wong (Malaysia) Cheng S Y	6	13
(Chinese Taipei) Yang P-h (Chinese Taipei) Hu L-f	21	21
5	(Denmark) M Christiansen (Denmark) A Bøje	21	21
(Chinese Taipei) Liu K-h (Chinese Taipei) Hsu Y-h	11	17

Quarter-finals
(Chinese Taipei) Yang P-h (Chinese Taipei) Hu L-f	21	15	10
5	(Denmark) M Christiansen (Denmark) A Bøje	16	21	21

==== Section 2 ====
First round
4	(France) T Gicquel (France) D Delrue	21	21
(Indonesia) R N Kusharjanto (Indonesia) G E Widjaja	18	19
(Indonesia) B Setiabudi (Indonesia) M D Oktavianti	21	16	15
(China) Gao JX (China) Wei YX	19	21	21
7	(Hong Kong) Tang C M (Hong Kong) Tse Y S	21	21
(France) J Maio (France) L Palermo	14	17
(Germany) M Seidel (Germany) T P Nguyen	21	18	14
(Thailand) P Teeraratsakul (Thailand) S Taerattanachai	18	21	21

Second round
4	(France) T Gicquel (France) D Delrue	16	21	25
(China) Gao JX (China) Wei YX	21	19	27
7	(Hong Kong) Tang C M (Hong Kong) Tse Y S	21	21
(Thailand) P Teeraratsakul (Thailand) S Taerattanachai	19	13

Quarter-finals
(China) Gao JX (China) Wei YX	21	19	21
7	(Hong Kong) Tang C M (Hong Kong) Tse Y S	17	21	13

=== Bottom half ===
==== Section 3 ====
First round
(Malaysia) Wong T C (Malaysia) Lim C S	14	22	13
(India) D Kapila (India) T Crasto	21	20	21
(Japan) Y Watanabe (Japan) M Taguchi	21	21
6	(China) Guo XW (China) Chen FH	7	16
(South Korea) Kim J-h (South Korea) Jang H-j	14	21	21
(Malaysia) Goh S H (Malaysia) S J Lai	21	13	14
(Malaysia) Hoo P R (Malaysia) Lai P J	16	19
3	(Malaysia) Chen T J (Malaysia) Toh E W	21	21

Second round
(India) D Kapila (India) T Crasto	8	21	21
(Japan) Y Watanabe (Japan) M Taguchi	21	17	16
(South Korea) Kim J-h (South Korea) Jang H-j	20	14
3	(Malaysia) Chen T J (Malaysia) Toh E W	22	21

Quarter-finals
(India) D Kapila (India) T Crasto	16
3	(Malaysia) Chen T J (Malaysia) Toh E W	18^{r}

==== Section 4 ====
First round
(Canada) K Lee (Canada) E Zhang	16	13
(Thailand) R Oupthong (Thailand) J Sudjaipraparat	21	21
(Japan) Y Shimogami (Japan) S Hobara	21	21
8	(Chinese Taipei) Ye H-w (Chinese Taipei) N G Chan	14	14
(United States) Chen Z-y (United States) F Corbett	21	21
(Spain) R García (Spain) L Rodríguez	18	10
(United States) P Smith (United States) J Gai	15	15
2	(Thailand) D Puavaranukroh (Thailand) S Paewsampran	21	21

Second round
(Thailand) R Oupthong (Thailand) J Sudjaipraparat	11	14
(Japan) Y Shimogami (Japan) S Hobara	21	21
(United States) Chen Z-y (United States) F Corbett	6	11
2	(Thailand) D Puavaranukroh (Thailand) S Paewsampran	21	21

Quarter-finals
(Japan) Y Shimogami (Japan) S Hobara	21	21	21
2	(Thailand) D Puavaranukroh (Thailand) S Paewsampran	19	23	16

Preceded by 2026 Malaysia Masters	BWF World Tour; 2026 BWF season	Succeeded by 2026 Indonesia Open
