= 2025 Denmark Open =

Tournament details
- Dates: 14–19 October
- Edition: 74th
- Level: Super 750
- Total prize money: US$950,000
- Venue: Arena Fyn
- Location: Odense, Denmark

Champions
- Men's singles: (Indonesia) Jonatan Christie
- Women's singles: (South Korea) An Se-young
- Men's doubles: (Japan) Takuro Hoki (Japan) Yugo Kobayashi
- Women's doubles: (South Korea) Baek Ha-na (South Korea) Lee So-hee
- Mixed doubles: (China) Feng Yanzhe (China) Huang Dongping
- Official website: denmarkopen.dk

The 2025 Denmark Open (officially known as the Victor Denmark Open 2025 for sponsorship reasons) was a badminton tournament which took place at the Arena Fyn in Odense, Denmark, from 14 to 19 October 2025 and had a total prize of US$950,000.

== Tournament ==
The 2025 Denmark Open was the twenty-ninth tournament according to the 2025 BWF World Tour. It was a part of the Denmark Open, which had been held since 1936. This tournament was organized by Badminton Denmark with sanction from the BWF.

=== Venue ===
This tournament was held at the Arena Fyn in Odense, Denmark.

=== Point distribution ===
Below is the point distribution table for each phase of the tournament based on the BWF points system for the BWF World Tour Super 750 event.

Winner	Runner-up	3/4	5/8	9/16	17/32
11,000	9,350	7,700	6,050	4,320	2,660

=== Prize pool ===
The total prize money is US$950,000 with the distribution of the prize money in accordance with BWF regulations.

Event	Winner	Finalist	Semi-finals	Quarter-finals	Last 16	Last 32
Singles	$66,500	$32,300	$13,300	$5,225	$2,850	$950
Doubles	$70,300	$33,250	$13,300	$5,937.50	$3,087.50	$950

== Men's singles ==
=== Seeds ===
1. (China) Shi Yuqi (final)
2. (Denmark) Anders Antonsen (second round)
3. (Thailand) Kunlavut Vitidsarn (quarter-finals)
4. (China) Li Shifeng (quarter-finals)
5. (Chinese Taipei) Chou Tien-chen (first round)
6. (Indonesia) Jonatan Christie (champion)
7. (France) Alex Lanier (semi-finals)
8. (France) Christo Popov (quarter-finals)

=== Finals ===
Semi-finals
1	(China) Shi Yuqi	21	17	21
(Denmark) Viktor Axelsen	19	21	17
6	(Indonesia) Jonatan Christie	11	21	21
7	(France) Alex Lanier	21	8	13

Final
1	(China) Shi Yuqi	21	15	15
6	(Indonesia) Jonatan Christie	13	21	21

=== Top half ===
==== Section 1 ====
First round
1	(China) Shi YQ	21	21
(Hong Kong) Lee C Y	10	11
(Hong Kong) Ng K L	21	21
(Indonesia) A Farhan	10	16
8	(France) C Popov	21	23
(Chinese Taipei) Lin C-y	13	21
(China) Wang ZX	19	12
(Denmark) R Gemke	21	21

Second round
1	(China) Shi YQ	21	21
(Hong Kong) Ng K L	10	18
8	(France) C Popov	21	21
(Denmark) R Gemke	9	13

Quarter-finals
1	(China) Shi YQ	21	19	21
8	(France) C Popov	19	21	19

==== Section 2 ====
First round
3	(Thailand) K Vitidsarn	20	21	21
(China) Lu GZ	22	9	18
(France) T J Popov	21	17	21
(India) A Shetty	19	21	15
5	(Chinese Taipei) Chou T-c	19	12
(Denmark) V Axelsen	21	21
(Chinese Taipei) Wang T-w	19	15
(Japan) Y Tanaka	21	21

Second round
3	(Thailand) K Vitidsarn	22	12	21
(France) T J Popov	20	21	13
(Denmark) V Axelsen	11	21	24
(Japan) Y Tanaka	21	19	22

Quarter-finals
3	(Thailand) K Vitidsarn	21	12	18
(Denmark) V Axelsen	13	21	21

=== Bottom half ===
==== Section 3 ====
First round
(Japan) K Naraoka	21	21
(Chinese Taipei) Chi Y-j	15	10
(Japan) K Nishimoto	21	11	7
6	(Indonesia) J Christie	10	21	21
(Chinese Taipei) Lee C-h	21	21
(Singapore) J Teh	17	14
(Malaysia) Leong J H	13	16
4	(China) Li SF	21	21

Second round
(Japan) K Naraoka	7	13
6	(Indonesia) J Christie	21	21
(Chinese Taipei) Lee C-h	21	19	19
4	(China) Li SF	16	21	21

Quarter-finals
6	(Indonesia) J Christie	21	21	21
4	(China) Li SF	18	23	17

==== Section 4 ====
First round
(Singapore) Loh K Y	17	21	17
(China) Weng HY	21	11	21
(Japan) K Watanabe	18	16
7	(France) A Lanier	21	21
(Republic of Ireland) N Nguyen	21	8	18
(India) L Sen	10	21	21
(Indonesia) A S Ginting	7	19
2	(Denmark) A Antonsen	21	21

Second round
(China) Weng HY	23	18
7	(France) A Lanier	25	21
(India) L Sen	21	21
2	(Denmark) A Antonsen	13	14

Quarter-finals
7	(France) A Lanier	21	21
(India) L Sen	9	14

== Women's singles ==
=== Seeds ===
1. (South Korea) An Se-young (champion)
2. (China) Wang Zhiyi (final)
3. (China) Han Yue (semi-finals)
4. (Japan) Akane Yamaguchi (semi-finals)
5. (China) Chen Yufei (second round)
6. (Thailand) Pornpawee Chochuwong (withdrew)
7. (Indonesia) Putri Kusuma Wardani (second round)
8. (Indonesia) Gregoria Mariska Tunjung (first round)

=== Finals ===
Semi-finals
1	(South Korea) An Se-young	16	21	21
4	(Japan) Akane Yamaguchi	21	10	9
3	(China) Han Yue	26	5	10
2	(China) Wang Zhiyi	24	21	21

Final
1	(South Korea) An Se-young	21	24
2	(China) Wang Zhiyi	5	22

=== Top half ===
==== Section 1 ====
First round
1	(South Korea) An S-y	21	21
(Spain) C Azurmendi	15	9
(Japan) N Nidaira	18	21	22
(Chinese Taipei) Pai Y-p	21	17	20
7	(Indonesia) P K Wardani	21	21
(India) A Kharb	9	14
(China) Gao FJ
(Japan) T Miyazaki	w	/	o

Second round
1	(South Korea) An S-y	21	21
(Japan) N Nidaira	18	11
7	(Indonesia) P K Wardani	21	12	17
(Japan) T Miyazaki	15	21	21

Quarter-finals
1	(South Korea) An S-y	16	21	21
(Japan) T Miyazaki	21	9	6

==== Section 2 ====
First round
4	(Japan) A Yamaguchi	21	21
(Thailand) S Katethong	13	8
(China) Han QX	21	21
(United States) BW Zhang	14	16
8	(Indonesia) G M Tunjung	7	14
(Scotland) K Gilmour	21	21
(Chinese Taipei) Sung S-y	11	18
(Chinese Taipei) Chiu P-c	21	21

Second round
4	(Japan) A Yamaguchi	21	21
(China) Han QX	8	17
(Scotland) K Gilmour	13	21	11
(Chinese Taipei) Chiu P-c	21	12	21

Quarter-finals
4	(Japan) A Yamaguchi	16	21	21
(Chinese Taipei) Chiu P-c	21	8	7

=== Bottom half ===
==== Section 3 ====
First round
(Japan) R Gunji	18	14
(Denmark) M Blichfeldt	21	21
(Denmark) J D Jakobsen	13	8
5	(China) Chen YF	21	21
(Thailand) B Ongbamrungphan	21	21
(Ukraine) P Buhrova	11	13
(Singapore) Yeo J M	14	10
3	(China) Han Y	21	21

Second round
(Denmark) M Blichfeldt	21	21
5	(China) Chen YF	9	17
(Thailand) B Ongbamrungphan	16	13
3	(China) Han Y	21	21

Quarter-finals
(Denmark) M Blichfeldt	21	6	16
3	(China) Han Y	17	21	21

==== Section 4 ====
First round
(Bulgaria) S Stoeva	10	13
(South Korea) Kim G-e	21	21
(Canada) M Li	16	21	21
(Thailand) R Intanon	21	12	19
(Denmark) L Christophersen	21	19	21
(Denmark) L Kjærsfeldt	19	21	19
(Germany) Y Li	17	12
2	(China) Wang ZY	21	21

Second round
(South Korea) Kim G-e	17	21	10
(Canada) M Li	21	18	21
(Denmark) L Christophersen	17	14
2	(China) Wang ZY	21	21

Quarter-finals
(Canada) M Li	22	6	15
2	(China) Wang ZY	20	21	21

== Men's doubles ==
=== Seeds ===
1. (South Korea) Kim Won-ho / Seo Seung-jae (second round)
2. (Malaysia) Aaron Chia / Soh Wooi Yik (first round)
3. (Malaysia) Goh Sze Fei / Nur Izzuddin (first round)
4. (Denmark) Kim Astrup / Anders Skaarup Rasmussen (first round)
5. (China) Liang Weikeng / Wang Chang (semi-finals)
6. (India) Satwiksairaj Rankireddy / Chirag Shetty (semi-finals)
7. (Indonesia) Fajar Alfian / Muhammad Shohibul Fikri (final)
8. (China) Chen Boyang / Liu Yi (quarter-finals)

=== Finals ===
Semi-finals
5	(China) Liang Weikeng (China) Wang Chang	15	18
7	(Indonesia) Fajar Alfian (Indonesia) Muhammad Shohibul Fikri	21	21
(Japan) Takuro Hoki (Japan) Yugo Kobayashi	23	18	21
6	(India) Satwiksairaj Rankireddy (India) Chirag Shetty	21	21	16

Final
7	(Indonesia) Fajar Alfian (Indonesia) Muhammad Shohibul Fikri	18	21	19
(Japan) Takuro Hoki (Japan) Yugo Kobayashi	21	15	21

=== Top half ===
==== Section 1 ====
First round
1	(South Korea) Kim W-h (South Korea) Seo S-j	21	21
(Denmark) W K Boe (Denmark) C F Kjær	11	11
(Malaysia) N M Azriyn A (Malaysia) Tan W K	21	21
(China) Xie HN (China) Zeng WH	13	15
5	(China) Liang WK (China) Wang C	21	18	21
(Malaysia) Choong H J (Malaysia) M Haikal	19	21	15
(China) Huang D (China) Liu Ya	16	15
(Indonesia) S K Gutama (Indonesia) M R P Isfahani	21	21

Second round
1	(South Korea) Kim W-h (South Korea) Seo S-j	19	14
(Malaysia) N M Azriyn A (Malaysia) Tan W K	21	21
5	(China) Liang WK (China) Wang C	21	21
(Indonesia) S K Gutama (Indonesia) M R P Isfahani	14	18

Quarter-finals
(Malaysia) N M Azriyn A (Malaysia) Tan W K	19	18
5	(China) Liang WK (China) Wang C	21	21

==== Section 2 ====
First round
3	(Malaysia) Goh S F (Malaysia) N Izzuddin	13	21	14
(England) B Lane (England) S Vendy	21	13	21
(India) P Roy (India) K. Sai Pratheek	13	17
(Chinese Taipei) Liu K-h (Chinese Taipei) Yang P-ha	21	21
7	(Indonesia) F Alfian (Indonesia) M S Fikri	21	21
(Japan) K Mitsuhashi (Japan) H Okamura	17	13
(Denmark) D Lundgaard (Denmark) M Vestergaard	17	22	21
(Thailand) K Kedren (Thailand) D Puavaranukroh	21	20	18

Second round
(England) B Lane (England) S Vendy	21	21
(Chinese Taipei) Liu K-h (Chinese Taipei) Yang P-ha	11	14
7	(Indonesia) F Alfian (Indonesia) M S Fikri	21	18	21
(Denmark) D Lundgaard (Denmark) M Vestergaard	16	21	18

Quarter-finals
(England) B Lane (England) S Vendy	8	15
7	(Indonesia) F Alfian (Indonesia) M S Fikri	21	21

=== Bottom half ===
==== Section 3 ====
First round
(France) C Popov (France) T J Popov	21	21
(Malaysia) Ong Y S (Malaysia) Teo E Y	19	14
(South Korea) Kang M-h (South Korea) Ki D-j	15^{r}
8	(China) Chen BY (China) Liu Yi	21
(Japan) T Hoki (Japan) Y Kobayashi	21	21
(Malaysia) J Arif (Malaysia) Yap R K	15	19
(Chinese Taipei) Chiu H-c (Chinese Taipei) Wang C-l	21	13	21
4	(Denmark) K Astrup (Denmark) A S Rasmussen	17	21	15

Second round
(France) C Popov (France) T J Popov	19	13
8	(China) Chen BY (China) Liu Yi	21	21
(Japan) T Hoki (Japan) Y Kobayashi	21	21
(Chinese Taipei) Chiu H-c (Chinese Taipei) Wang C-l	13	14

Quarter-finals
8	(China) Chen BY (China) Liu Yi	17	14
(Japan) T Hoki (Japan) Y Kobayashi	21	21

==== Section 4 ====
First round
(Japan) H Midorikawa (Japan) K Yamashita	21	13	15
(Chinese Taipei) Lee J-h (Chinese Taipei) Yang P-hs	17	21	21
(Scotland) C Grimley (Scotland) M Grimley	21	11	17
6	(India) S Rankireddy (India) C Shetty	17	21	21
(Indonesia) L R Carnando (Indonesia) B Maulana	19	13
(Japan) T Nomura (Japan) Y Shimogami	21	21
(Indonesia) M R Ardianto (Indonesia) R Hidayat	21	21
2	(Malaysia) A Chia (Malaysia) Soh W Y	17	13

Second round
(Chinese Taipei) Lee J-h (Chinese Taipei) Yang P-hs	19	17
6	(India) S Rankireddy (India) C Shetty	21	21
(Japan) T Nomura (Japan) Y Shimogami	15	21	17
(Indonesia) M R Ardianto (Indonesia) R Hidayat	21	16	21

Quarter-finals
6	(India) S Rankireddy (India) C Shetty	21	18	21
(Indonesia) M R Ardianto (Indonesia) R Hidayat	15	21	16

== Women's doubles ==
=== Seeds ===
1. (China) Liu Shengshu / Tan Ning (quarter-finals)
2. (Malaysia) Pearly Tan / Thinaah Muralitharan (second round)
3. (South Korea) Kim Hye-jeong / Kong Hee-yong (final)
4. (Japan) Rin Iwanaga / Kie Nakanishi (quarter-finals)
5. (China) Chen Qingchen / Jia Yifan (semi-finals)
6. (South Korea) Baek Ha-na / Lee So-hee (champions)
7. (Japan) Yuki Fukushima / Mayu Matsumoto (semi-finals)
8. (China) Li Yijing / Luo Xumin (first round)

=== Finals ===
Semi-finals
7	(Japan) Yuki Fukushima (Japan) Mayu Matsumoto	15	19
6	(South Korea) Baek Ha-na (South Korea) Lee So-hee	21	21
3	(South Korea) Kim Hye-jeong (South Korea) Kong Hee-yong	21	21
5	(China) Chen Qingchen (China) Jia Yifan	18	9

Final
6	(South Korea) Baek Ha-na (South Korea) Lee So-hee	15	21	21
3	(South Korea) Kim Hye-jeong (South Korea) Kong Hee-yong	21	14	15

=== Top half ===
==== Section 1 ====
First round
1	(China) Liu SS (China) Tan N	21	21
(United States) F Corbett (United States) J Gai	15	18
(India) R Panda (India) S Panda	23	17	15
(Scotland) J MacPherson (Scotland) C Torrance	21	21	21
7	(Japan) Y Fukushima (Japan) M Matsumoto	22	21
(China) Bao LJ (China) Zhang SX	20	14
(Chinese Taipei) Hu L-f (Chinese Taipei) Jheng Y-c	17	20
(Japan) R Hirokami (Japan) S Hobara	21	22

Second round
1	(China) Liu SS (China) Tan N	21	21
(Scotland) J MacPherson (Scotland) C Torrance	11	12
7	(Japan) Y Fukushima (Japan) M Matsumoto	21	21
(Japan) R Hirokami (Japan) S Hobara	17	13

Quarter-finals
1	(China) Liu SS (China) Tan N	21	15	15
7	(Japan) Y Fukushima (Japan) M Matsumoto	15	21	21

==== Section 2 ====
First round
4	(Japan) R Iwanaga (Japan) K Nakanishi	21	21
(Indonesia) L T Mayasari (Indonesia) A C Pratiwi	19	10
(India) K Selvam (India) S Singhi	4	11
(Bulgaria) G Stoeva (Bulgaria) S Stoeva	21	21
6	(South Korea) Baek H-n (South Korea) Lee S-h	21	25
(Chinese Taipei) Hsieh P-s (Chinese Taipei) Hung E-t	17	23
(Indonesia) F D Kusuma (Indonesia) M T Puspita Sari	21	21
(Poland) P Cybulska (Poland) K Marczak	4	16

Second round
4	(Japan) R Iwanaga (Japan) K Nakanishi	21	15	21
(Bulgaria) G Stoeva (Bulgaria) S Stoeva	12	21	15
6	(South Korea) Baek H-n (South Korea) Lee S-h	21	16	21
(Indonesia) F D Kusuma (Indonesia) M T Puspita Sari	14	21	16

Quarter-finals
4	(Japan) R Iwanaga (Japan) K Nakanishi	23	18	16
6	(South Korea) Baek H-n (South Korea) Lee S-h	21	21	21

=== Bottom half ===
==== Section 3 ====
First round
(South Korea) Jeong N-e (South Korea) Lee Y-w	21	21
(Malaysia) Go P K (Malaysia) Teoh M X	5	16
(Chinese Taipei) Hsu Y-h (Chinese Taipei) Lin J-y	23	21	21
8	(China) Li YJ (China) Luo XM	25	15	18
(Ukraine) P Buhrova (Ukraine) Y Kantemyr	11	16
(Malaysia) Ong X Y (Malaysia) C Ting	21	21
(Hong Kong) Lui L L (Hong Kong) Tsang H Y	11	11
3	(South Korea) Kim H-j (South Korea) Kong H-y	21	21

Second round
(South Korea) Jeong N-e (South Korea) Lee Y-w	21	17	21
(Chinese Taipei) Hsu Y-h (Chinese Taipei) Lin J-y	11	21	7
(Malaysia) Ong X Y (Malaysia) C Ting	21	10	7
3	(South Korea) Kim H-j (South Korea) Kong H-y	19	21	21

Quarter-finals
(South Korea) Jeong N-e (South Korea) Lee Y-w	13	12
3	(South Korea) Kim H-j (South Korea) Kong H-y	21	21

==== Section 4 ====
First round
(Chinese Taipei) Hsu Y-c (Chinese Taipei) Sung Y-h	21	18	21
(Chinese Taipei) Sung S-y (Chinese Taipei) Yu C-h	7	21	19
(Japan) K Osawa (Japan) M Tanabe	13	22
5	(China) Chen QC (China) Jia YF	21	24
(Japan) A Igarashi (Japan) C Shida	21	21
(Hong Kong) Yeung N T (Hong Kong) Yeung P L	7	16
(Indonesia) R A Rose (Indonesia) F Setianingrum	13	17
2	(Malaysia) P Tan (Malaysia) Thinaah M	21	21

Second round
(Chinese Taipei) Hsu Y-c (Chinese Taipei) Sung Y-h	17	15
5	(China) Chen QC (China) Jia YF	21	21
(Japan) A Igarashi (Japan) C Shida	21	21
2	(Malaysia) P Tan (Malaysia) Thinaah M	18	9

Quarter-finals
5	(China) Chen QC (China) Jia YF	20	21	21
(Japan) A Igarashi (Japan) C Shida	22	14	19

== Mixed doubles ==
=== Seeds ===
1. (China) Jiang Zhenbang / Wei Yaxin (final)
2. (China) Feng Yanzhe / Huang Dongping (champions)
3. (Thailand) Dechapol Puavaranukroh / Supissara Paewsampran (second round)
4. (Malaysia) Chen Tang Jie / Toh Ee Wei (semi-finals)
5. (China) Guo Xinwa / Chen Fanghui (quarter-finals)
6. (France) Thom Gicquel / Delphine Delrue (first round)
7. (Hong Kong) Tang Chun Man / Tse Ying Suet (second round)
8. (Malaysia) Goh Soon Huat / Shevon Jemie Lai (quarter-finals)

=== Finals ===
Semi-finals
1	(China) Jiang Zhenbang (China) Wei Yaxin	21	18	21
4	(Malaysia) Chen Tang Jie (Malaysia) Toh Ee Wei	17	21	18
(Japan) Hiroki Midorikawa (Japan) Natsu Saito	8	11
2	(China) Feng Yanzhe (China) Huang Dongping	21	21

Final
1	(China) Jiang Zhenbang (China) Wei Yaxin	13	9
2	(China) Feng Yanzhe (China) Huang Dongping	21	21

=== Top half ===
==== Section 1 ====
First round
1	(China) Jiang ZB (China) Wei YX	21	21
(Indonesia) J Hidayatullah (Indonesia) F Pasaribu	16	7
(Scotland) A Dunn (Scotland) J MacPherson	21	21
(Thailand) P Teeraratsakul (Thailand) S Taerattanachai	19	17
7	(Hong Kong) Tang C M (Hong Kong) Tse Y S	24	21
(England) C Hemming (England) E van Leeuwen	22	11
(Denmark) M Christiansen (Denmark) A Bøje	21	21
(France) J Maio (France) L Palermo	8	8

Second round
1	(China) Jiang ZB (China) Wei YX	21	21
(Scotland) A Dunn (Scotland) J MacPherson	13	15
7	(Hong Kong) Tang C M (Hong Kong) Tse Y S	22	16
(Denmark) M Christiansen (Denmark) A Bøje	24	21

Quarter-finals
1	(China) Jiang ZB (China) Wei YX	21	21	21
(Denmark) M Christiansen (Denmark) A Bøje	16	23	19

==== Section 2 ====
First round
4	(Malaysia) Chen T J (Malaysia) Toh E W	21	21
(Chinese Taipei) Yang P-hs (Chinese Taipei) Hu L-f	15	9
(China) Gao JX (China) Wu MY	21	13	21
(Thailand) P Horbanluekit (Thailand) B Aimsaard	12	21	17
8	(Malaysia) Goh S H (Malaysia) S J Lai	21	21
(Chinese Taipei) Lu M-c (Chinese Taipei) Hung E-t	14	17
(Denmark) J Toft (Denmark) A Magelund	18	19
(Japan) Y Shimogami (Japan) S Hobara	21	21

Second round
4	(Malaysia) Chen T J (Malaysia) Toh E W	21	21
(China) Gao JX (China) Wu MY	14	11
8	(Malaysia) Goh S H (Malaysia) S J Lai	21	21
(Japan) Y Shimogami (Japan) S Hobara	13	18

Quarter-finals
4	(Malaysia) Chen T J (Malaysia) Toh E W	21	21
8	(Malaysia) Goh S H (Malaysia) S J Lai	17	11

=== Bottom half ===
==== Section 3 ====
First round
(Indonesia) A Maulana (Indonesia) I C S Jamil	21	21
(India) M Jaglan (India) L Jaglan	14	11
(South Korea) Lee J-m (South Korea) Chae Y-j	17	21	21
6	(France) T Gicquel (France) D Delrue	21	18	19
(Indonesia) A Syahnawi (Indonesia) N V Marwah	13	20
(Japan) H Midorikawa (Japan) N Saito	21	22
(Chinese Taipei) Chen C-k (Chinese Taipei) Hsu Y-h	21	20	18
3	(Thailand) D Puavaranukroh (Thailand) S Paewsampran	19	22	21

Second round
(Indonesia) A Maulana (Indonesia) I C S Jamil	19	19
(South Korea) Lee J-m (South Korea) Chae Y-j	21	21
(Japan) H Midorikawa (Japan) N Saito	21	20	21
3	(Thailand) D Puavaranukroh (Thailand) S Paewsampran	18	22	12

Quarter-finals
(South Korea) Lee J-m (South Korea) Chae Y-j	13	8
(Japan) H Midorikawa (Japan) N Saito	21	21

==== Section 4 ====
First round
(Thailand) R Oupthong (Thailand) J Sudjaipraparat	21	21
(Chinese Taipei) Ye H-w (Chinese Taipei) N G Chan	17	15
(India) R Kapoor (India) R Gadde	19	15
5	(China) Guo XW (China) Chen FH	21	21
(Malaysia) Wong T C (Malaysia) Lim C S	7	14
(India) D Kapila (India) T Crasto	21	21
(Denmark) M Vestergaard (Denmark) C Busch	14	16
2	(China) Feng YZ (China) Huang DP	21	21

Second round
(Thailand) R Oupthong (Thailand) J Sudjaipraparat	20	16
5	(China) Guo XW (China) Chen FH	22	21
(India) D Kapila (India) T Crasto
2	(China) Feng YZ (China) Huang DP	w	/	o

Quarter-finals
5	(China) Guo XW (China) Chen FH	12	21
2	(China) Feng YZ (China) Huang DP	21	23

Preceded by 2025 Arctic Open	BWF World Tour; 2025 BWF season	Succeeded by 2025 French Open; 2025 Indonesia Masters Super 100 II
