= 2026 Indonesia Open =

2026 badminton tournament in Indonesia

Tournament details
- Dates: 2–7 June
- Edition: 44th
- Level: Super 1000
- Total prize money: US$1,450,000
- Venue: Istora Gelora Bung Karno
- Location: Jakarta, Indonesia

Champions
- Men's singles: (Canada) Victor Lai
- Women's singles: (South Korea) An Se-young
- Men's doubles: (Malaysia) Goh Sze Fei (Malaysia) Nur Izzuddin
- Women's doubles: (Japan) Yuki Fukushima (Japan) Mayu Matsumoto
- Mixed doubles: (Denmark) Mathias Christiansen (Denmark) Alexandra Bøje

The 2026 Indonesia Open (officially known as the Polytron Indonesia Open 2026 for sponsorship reasons) was a badminton tournament which took place at Istora Gelora Bung Karno in Jakarta from 2 to 7 June 2026 and had a total purse of $1,450,000.

== Tournament ==
The 2026 Indonesia Open tournament is the fourteenth tournament of the 2026 BWF World Tour and also part of Indonesia Open which have been held since 1982. It is organized by the Badminton Association of Indonesia and sanctioned by the BWF.

The tournament was one of several HSBC BWF World Tour events selected to trial the federation's Time Clock system. Under the regulations, the clock started when the umpire updated the score, and players had 25 seconds to be ready to serve or receive. Umpires retained discretion to allow additional time following interruptions such as medical intervention or extended court mopping.

=== Venue ===
The tournament was held at the Istora Gelora Bung Karno inside the Gelora Bung Karno Sports Complex in Central Jakarta, Jakarta, Indonesia.

=== Point distribution ===
Below is the point distribution table for each phase of the tournament based on the BWF points system for the BWF World Tour Super 1000 event.

Winner	Runner-up	3/4	5/8	9/16	17/32
12,000	10,200	8,400	6,600	4,800	3,000

=== Prize money ===
The total prize money for this tournament is US$1,450,000. The distribution of the prize money is in accordance with BWF regulations.

Event	Winner	Finalist	Semi-finals	Quarter-finals	Last 16	Last 32
Singles	$101,500	$49,300	$20,300	$7,975	$4,350	$1,450
Doubles	$107,300	$50,750	$20,300	$9,062.50	$4,712.50	$1,450

== Men's singles ==
=== Seeds ===
1. (China) Shi Yuqi (second round)
2. (Thailand) Kunlavut Vitidsarn (first round)
3. (Denmark) Anders Antonsen (first round)
4. (France) Christo Popov (first round)
5. (Indonesia) Jonatan Christie (final)
6. (Chinese Taipei) Chou Tien-chen (semi-finals)
7. (China) Li Shifeng (second round)
8. (Chinese Taipei) Lin Chun-yi (first round)

=== Finals ===
Semi-finals
5	(Indonesia) Jonatan Christie	16	21	21
(Thailand) Panitchaphon Teeraratsakul	21	10	12
6	(Chinese Taipei) Chou Tien-chen	19	21	19
(Canada) Victor Lai	21	19	21

Final
5	(Indonesia) Jonatan Christie	19	8
(Canada) Victor Lai	21	21

=== Top half ===
==== Section 1 ====
First round
1	(China) Shi YQ	21	21
(Chinese Taipei) Chi Y-j	19	19
(India) S Kidambi	19	15
(Japan) Y Tanaka	21	21
5	(Indonesia) J Christie	21	21
(Singapore) J Teh	18	15
(Indonesia) A Farhan	21	21
(India) L Sen	19	16

Second round
1	(China) Shi YQ	16	11
(Japan) Y Tanaka	21	21
5	(Indonesia) J Christie	17	21	21
(Indonesia) A Farhan	21	17	16

Quarter-finals
(Japan) Y Tanaka	19	22
5	(Indonesia) J Christie	21	24

==== Section 2 ====
First round
3	(Denmark) A Antonsen	8	17
(France) A Lanier	21	21
(Japan) K Naraoka	17	17
(Malaysia) Leong J H	21	21
7	(China) Li SF	21	21
(Japan) K Nishimoto	16	11
(Thailand) Pan Teeraratsakul	21	23
(China) Lu GZ	12	21

Second round
(France) A Lanier	21	21
(Malaysia) Leong J H	16	15
7	(China) Li SF	21	6	12
(Thailand) Pan Teeraratsakul	18	21	21

Quarter-finals
(France) A Lanier	18	21	17
(Thailand) Pan Teeraratsakul	21	7	21

=== Bottom half ===
==== Section 3 ====
First round
(Hong Kong) Ng K L	14	21	0
(Singapore) Loh K Y	21	16	0^{r}
(Chinese Taipei) Wang T-w	8	21	12
6	(Chinese Taipei) Chou T-c	21	10	21
(India) A Shetty	8	22	21
(China) Weng HY	21	20	15
(Hong Kong) Lee C Y	21	19	21
4	(France) C Popov	15	21	11

Second round
(Hong Kong) Ng K L	15	21	14
6	(Chinese Taipei) Chou T-c	21	16	21
(India) A Shetty	21	13	14
(Hong Kong) Lee C Y	16	21	21

Quarter-finals
6	(Chinese Taipei) Chou T-c	21	21
(Hong Kong) Lee C Y	15	15

==== Section 4 ====
First round
(Canada) B Yang	19	15
(Japan) K Watanabe	21	21
(Canada) V Lai	21	21
8	(Chinese Taipei) Lin C-y	12	18
(India) Prannoy H. S.	17	21	19
(Republic of Ireland) N Nguyen	21	16	21
(France) T J Popov	5
2	(Thailand) K Vitidsarn	1^{r}

Second round
(Japan) K Watanabe	10	9
(Canada) V Lai	21	21
(Republic of Ireland) N Nguyen	16	19
(France) T J Popov	21	21

Quarter-finals
(Canada) V Lai	21	21
(France) T J Popov	8	14

== Women's singles ==
=== Seeds ===
1. (South Korea) An Se-young (champion)
2. (China) Wang Zhiyi (second round)
3. (Japan) Akane Yamaguchi (final)
4. (China) Chen Yufei (semi-finals)
5. (Indonesia) Putri Kusuma Wardani (quarter-finals)
6. (Thailand) Ratchanok Intanon (first round)
7. (Thailand) Pornpawee Chochuwong (quarter-finals)
8. (Japan) Tomoka Miyazaki (quarter-finals)

=== Finals ===
Semi-finals
1	(South Korea) An Se-young	21	19	23
4	(China) Chen Yufei	17	21	21
3	(Japan) Akane Yamaguchi	21	21
(South Korea) Sim Yu-jin	14	7

Final
1	(South Korea) An Se-young	23	21
3	(Japan) Akane Yamaguchi	21	12

=== Top half ===
==== Section 1 ====
First round
1	(South Korea) An S-y	21	21
(Turkey) N Arın	18	6
(India) P. V. Sindhu	25	21
(Thailand) B Ongbamrungphan	23	16
7	(Thailand) P Chochuwong	21	21
(India) M Bansod	12	10
(Japan) R Gunji	8	21	22
(South Korea) Kim G-e	21	11	24

Second round
1	(South Korea) An S-y	21	21
(India) P. V. Sindhu	17	15
7	(Thailand) P Chochuwong	21	21
(South Korea) Kim G-e	13	9

Quarter-finals
1	(South Korea) An S-y	21	21
7	(Thailand) P Chochuwong	19	11

==== Section 2 ====
First round
4	(China) Chen YF	21	19	21
(Denmark) L Christophersen	15	21	15
(Japan) H Akechi	12	16
(Japan) N Nidaira	21	21
5	(Indonesia) P K Wardani	21	21
(Chinese Taipei) Sung S-y	13	14
(Thailand) S Katethong	20	12
(Canada) M Li	22	21

Second round
4	(China) Chen YF	21	21
(Japan) N Nidaira	17	18
5	(Indonesia) P K Wardani	12	21	21
(Canada) M Li	21	18	16

Quarter-finals
4	(China) Chen YF	21	22
5	(Indonesia) P K Wardani	13	20

=== Bottom half ===
==== Section 3 ====
First round
(Vietnam) Nguyễn T L	8	13
(Thailand) P Opatniputh	21	21
(Chinese Taipei) Chiu P-c	19	21	21
6	(Thailand) R Intanon	21	16	19
(Denmark) L Kjærsfeldt	14	21	13
(Malaysia) Letshanaa K	21	19	21
(Chinese Taipei) Huang Y-h	17	11
3	(Japan) A Yamaguchi	21	21

Second round
(Thailand) P Opatniputh	18	19
(Chinese Taipei) Chiu P-c	21	21
(Malaysia) Letshanaa K	15	18
3	(Japan) A Yamaguchi	21	21

Quarter-finals
(Chinese Taipei) Chiu P-c	13	12
3	(Japan) A Yamaguchi	21	21

==== Section 4 ====
First round
(India) U Hooda	15	14
(Japan) N Okuhara	21	21
(Chinese Taipei) Lin H-t	16	16
8	(Japan) T Miyazaki	21	21
(Scotland) K Gilmour	17	18
(South Korea) Sim Y-j	21	21
(Singapore) Yeo J M	18	12
2	(China) Wang ZY	21	21

Second round
(Japan) N Okuhara	26	16	19
8	(Japan) T Miyazaki	24	21	21
(South Korea) Sim Y-j	21	24
2	(China) Wang ZY	16	22

Quarter-finals
8	(Japan) T Miyazaki	18	15
(South Korea) Sim Y-j	21	21

== Men's doubles ==
=== Seeds ===
1. (South Korea) Kim Won-ho / Seo Seung-jae (semi-finals)
2. (Malaysia) Aaron Chia / Soh Wooi Yik (second round)
3. (Indonesia) Fajar Alfian / Muhammad Shohibul Fikri (first round)
4. (India) Chirag Shetty / Satwiksairaj Rankireddy (first round)
5. (China) Liang Weikeng / Wang Chang (first round)
6. (Indonesia) Sabar Karyaman Gutama / Muhammad Reza Pahlevi Isfahani (semi-finals)
7. (Malaysia) Goh Sze Fei / Nur Izzuddin (champions)
8. (Japan) Takuro Hoki / Yugo Kobayashi (quarter-finals)

=== Finals ===
Semi-finals
1	(South Korea) Kim Won-ho (South Korea) Seo Seung-jae	18	21	16
7	(Malaysia) Goh Sze Fei (Malaysia) Nur Izzuddin	21	17	21
6	(Indonesia) Sabar Karyaman Gutama (Indonesia) Muhammad Reza Pahlevi Isfahani	15	18
(Indonesia) Raymond Indra (Indonesia) Nikolaus Joaquin	21	21

Final
7	(Malaysia) Goh Sze Fei (Malaysia) Nur Izzuddin	13	21	21
(Indonesia) Raymond Indra (Indonesia) Nikolaus Joaquin	21	18	10

=== Top half ===
==== Section 1 ====
First round
1	(South Korea) Kim W-h (South Korea) Seo S-j	21	21
(Chinese Taipei) Chiu H-c (Chinese Taipei) Wang C-l	18	10
(South Korea) Choi S-g (Malaysia) Goh V S	18	15
(France) C Popov (France) T J Popov	21	21
5	(China) Liang WK (China) Wang C	8	21	17
(Chinese Taipei) Lee F-c (Chinese Taipei) Lee F-j	21	17	21
(Indonesia) L R Carnando (Indonesia) D Marthin	16	21	19
(Chinese Taipei) Lee J-h (Chinese Taipei) Yang P-h	21	13	21

Second round
1	(South Korea) Kim W-h (South Korea) Seo S-j	21	21
(France) C Popov (France) T J Popov	17	17
(Chinese Taipei) Lee F-c (Chinese Taipei) Lee F-j	21	21	21
(Chinese Taipei) Lee J-h (Chinese Taipei) Yang P-h	23	18	13

Quarter-finals
1	(South Korea) Kim W-h (South Korea) Seo S-j	21	21
(Chinese Taipei) Lee F-c (Chinese Taipei) Lee F-j	11	17

==== Section 2 ====
First round
4	(India) S Rankireddy (India) C Shetty	6^{r}
(Malaysia) Kang K X (Malaysia) A Tai	11
(Malaysia) N M Azriyn A (Malaysia) Tan W K	18	10
(India) H Amsakarunan (India) Arjun M. R.	21	21
7	(Malaysia) Goh S F (Malaysia) N Izzuddin	21	21
(Singapore) W Koh (Singapore) J Kubo	17	16
(Japan) T Nomura (Japan) Y Shimogami	16	16
(England) B Lane (England) S Vendy	21	21

Second round
(Malaysia) Kang K X (Malaysia) A Tai	21	15	19
(India) H Amsakarunan (India) Arjun M. R.	16	21	21
7	(Malaysia) Goh S F (Malaysia) N Izzuddin	21	21
(England) B Lane (England) S Vendy	11	13

Quarter-finals
(India) H Amsakarunan (India) Arjun M. R.	12	10
7	(Malaysia) Goh S F (Malaysia) N Izzuddin	21	21

=== Bottom half ===
==== Section 3 ====
First round
PFR	(Canada) K Lee (Canada) T A Lindeman	16	21	16
(China) Huang D (China) Liu Y	21	19	21
(United States) Chen Z-y (United States) P Smith	19	21	21
6	(Indonesia) S K Gutama (Indonesia) M R P Isfahani	21	13	23
(Indonesia) A F Rayhan (Indonesia) D A Wahyudi	21	17	11
(Chinese Taipei) He Z-w (Chinese Taipei) Huang J-h	13	21	21
(China) Chen BY (China) Liu Y	21	21
3	(Indonesia) F Alfian (Indonesia) M S Fikri	13	14

Second round
(China) Huang D (China) Liu Y	15	21	17
6	(Indonesia) S K Gutama (Indonesia) M R P Isfahani	21	15	21
(Chinese Taipei) He Z-w (Chinese Taipei) Huang J-h	13	14
(China) Chen BY (China) Liu Y	21	21

Quarter-finals
6	(Indonesia) S K Gutama (Indonesia) M R P Isfahani	21	21
(China) Chen BY (China) Liu Y	15	15

==== Section 4 ====
First round
(South Korea) Kang M-h (South Korea) Ki D-j	21	21
(Denmark) D Lundgaard (Denmark) M Vestergaard	17	17
(Indonesia) M R Ardianto (Indonesia) R Hidayat	8	13
8	(Japan) T Hoki (Japan) Y Kobayashi	21	21
(Indonesia) R Indra (Indonesia) N Joaquin	21	21
(Japan) K Kumagai (Japan) H Nishi	9	13
(Malaysia) J Arif (Malaysia) Yap R K	15	14
2	(Malaysia) A Chia (Malaysia) Soh W Y	21	21

Second round
(South Korea) Kang M-h (South Korea) Ki D-j	21	18	14
8	(Japan) T Hoki (Japan) Y Kobayashi	18	21	21
(Indonesia) R Indra (Indonesia) N Joaquin	21	21
2	(Malaysia) A Chia (Malaysia) Soh W Y	14	14

Quarter-finals
8	(Japan) T Hoki (Japan) Y Kobayashi	21	22	18
(Indonesia) R Indra (Indonesia) N Joaquin	16	24	21

== Women's doubles ==
=== Seeds ===
1. (China) Liu Shengshu / Tan Ning (final)
2. (Malaysia) Pearly Tan / Thinaah Muralitharan (quarter-finals)
3. (South Korea) Baek Ha-na / Lee So-hee (first round)
4. (China) Jia Yifan / Zhang Shuxian (first round)
5. (Japan) Yuki Fukushima / Mayu Matsumoto (champions)
6. (Japan) Rin Iwanaga / Kie Nakanishi (quarter-finals)
7. (Chinese Taipei) Hsieh Pei-shan / Hung En-tzu (second round)
8. (Bulgaria) Gabriela Stoeva / Stefani Stoeva (first round)

=== Finals ===
Semi-finals
1	(China) Liu Shengshu (China) Tan Ning	21	21
(Indonesia) Rachel Allessya Rose (Indonesia) Febi Setianingrum	17	16
5	(Japan) Yuki Fukushima (Japan) Mayu Matsumoto	21	21
(Japan) Rui Hirokami (Japan) Sayaka Hobara	12	12

Final
1	(China) Liu Shengshu (China) Tan Ning	15	21	18
5	(Japan) Yuki Fukushima (Japan) Mayu Matsumoto	21	18	21

=== Top half ===
==== Section 1 ====
First round
1	(China) Liu SS (China) Tan N	21	21
(Ukraine) P Buhrova (Ukraine) Y Kantemyr	10	10
(Japan) H Suzuki (Japan) N Yamakita	21	21
(Turkey) B Erçetin (Turkey) N İnci	16	19
6	(Japan) R Iwanaga (Japan) K Nakanishi	21	17	21
(Chinese Taipei) Hsu Y-h (Chinese Taipei) Lin J-y	15	21	16
(United States) L Lam (United States) A Lee	15	18
(Japan) R Hiramoto (Japan) K Ishikawa	21	21

Second round
1	(China) Liu SS (China) Tan N	21	21
(Japan) H Suzuki (Japan) N Yamakita	8	11
6	(Japan) R Iwanaga (Japan) K Nakanishi	21	21
(Japan) R Hiramoto (Japan) K Ishikawa	15	17

Quarter-finals
1	(China) Liu SS (China) Tan N	21	21
6	(Japan) R Iwanaga (Japan) K Nakanishi	15	13

==== Section 2 ====
First round
4	(China) Jia YF (China) Zhang SX	9	21	21
(United States) F Corbett (United States) J Gai	21	10	23
(Indonesia) I S Meida (Indonesia) R K Nastine	20	17
(Indonesia) R A Rose (Indonesia) F Setianingrum	22	21
7	(Chinese Taipei) Hsieh P-s (Chinese Taipei) Hung E-t	21	21
(Chinese Taipei) Hu L-f (Chinese Taipei) Jheng Y-c	9	12
(Indonesia) F D Kusuma (Indonesia) M T Puspita Sari	21	21
(India) T Jolly (India) G Gopichand	14	12

Second round
(United States) F Corbett (United States) J Gai	18	21	13
(Indonesia) R A Rose (Indonesia) F Setianingrum	21	17	21
7	(Chinese Taipei) Hsieh P-s (Chinese Taipei) Hung E-t	21	17	15
(Indonesia) F D Kusuma (Indonesia) M T Puspita Sari	13	21	21

Quarter-finals
(Indonesia) R A Rose (Indonesia) F Setianingrum	8	21	21
(Indonesia) F D Kusuma (Indonesia) M T Puspita Sari	21	15	11

=== Bottom half ===
==== Section 3 ====
First round
(Chinese Taipei) Chang C-h (Chinese Taipei) Yang C-t	8	10
(Thailand) B Aimsaard (Thailand) N Aimsaard	21	21
(Indonesia) L T Mayasari (Indonesia) A Rahayu	18	19
5	(Japan) Y Fukushima (Japan) M Matsumoto	21	21
(Hong Kong) Yeung N T (Hong Kong) Yeung P L	18	21	21
(Japan) A Igarashi (Japan) C Shida	21	15	13
(Indonesia) A C Pratiwi (Indonesia) S F S Ramadhanti	21	17	21
3	(South Korea) Baek H-n (South Korea) Lee S-h	13	21	14

Second round
(Thailand) B Aimsaard (Thailand) N Aimsaard	16	14
5	(Japan) Y Fukushima (Japan) M Matsumoto	21	21
(Hong Kong) Yeung N T (Hong Kong) Yeung P L	19	18
(Indonesia) A C Pratiwi (Indonesia) S F S Ramadhanti	21	21

Quarter-finals
5	(Japan) Y Fukushima (Japan) M Matsumoto	13	21	21
(Indonesia) A C Pratiwi (Indonesia) S F S Ramadhanti	21	12	13

==== Section 4 ====
First round
(Japan) K Osawa (Japan) M Tanabe	21	9	19
(Malaysia) Ong X Y (Malaysia) C Ting	15	21	21
(Japan) R Hirokami (Japan) S Hobara	21	12	22
8	(Bulgaria) G Stoeva (Bulgaria) S Stoeva	6	21	20
(Hong Kong) Lui L L (Hong Kong) Tsang H Y	13	21	16
(Chinese Taipei) Hsu Y-c (Chinese Taipei) Sung Y-h	21	17	21
(Canada) J Dent (Canada) C Lai	13	14
2	(Malaysia) P Tan (Malaysia) Thinaah M	21	21

Second round
(Malaysia) Ong X Y (Malaysia) C Ting	14	21	13
(Japan) R Hirokami (Japan) S Hobara	21	18	21
(Chinese Taipei) Hsu Y-c (Chinese Taipei) Sung Y-h	18	19
2	(Malaysia) P Tan (Malaysia) Thinaah M	21	21

Quarter-finals
(Japan) R Hirokami (Japan) S Hobara	22	21
2	(Malaysia) P Tan (Malaysia) Thinaah M	20	16

== Mixed doubles ==
=== Seeds ===
1. (China) Feng Yanzhe / Huang Dongping (quarter-finals)
2. (Thailand) Dechapol Puavaranukroh / Supissara Paewsampran (quarter-finals)
3. (Malaysia) Chen Tang Jie / Toh Ee Wei (withdrew)
4. (France) Thom Gicquel / Delphine Delrue (semi-finals)
5. (Denmark) Mathias Christiansen / Alexandra Bøje (champions)
6. (China) Guo Xinwa / Chen Fanghui (semi-finals)
7. (Hong Kong) Tang Chun Man / Tse Ying Suet (second round)
8. (Indonesia) Jafar Hidayatullah / Felisha Pasaribu (second round)

=== Finals ===
Semi-finals
(China) Cheng Xing (China) Zhang Chi	21	11	21
6	(China) Guo Xinwa (China) Chen Fanghui	19	21	11
4	(France) Thom Gicquel (France) Delphine Delrue	21	13	15
5	(Denmark) Mathias Christiansen (Denmark) Alexandra Bøje	18	21	21

Final
(China) Cheng Xing (China) Zhang Chi	19	21
5	(Denmark) Mathias Christiansen (Denmark) Alexandra Bøje	21	23

=== Top half ===
==== Section 1 ====
First round
1	(China) Feng YZ (China) Huang DP	21	21
(Malaysia) J Wong (Malaysia) Cheng S Y	19	18
(Indonesia) A Maulana (Indonesia) I C S Jamil	14	21	21
(France) J Maio (France) L Palermo	21	19	11
7	(Hong Kong) Tang C M (Hong Kong) Tse Y S	18	22	21
(Thailand) R Oupthong (Thailand) J Sudjaipraparat	21	20	11
(Indonesia) D Ferdinansyah (Indonesia) B Wardana	10	9
(China) Cheng X (China) Zhang C	21	21

Second round
1	(China) Feng YZ (China) Huang DP	21	17	21
(Indonesia) A Maulana (Indonesia) I C S Jamil	14	21	18
7	(Hong Kong) Tang C M (Hong Kong) Tse Y S	20	18
(China) Cheng X (China) Zhang C	22	21

Quarter-finals
1	(China) Feng YZ (China) Huang DP	14	21	19
(China) Cheng X (China) Zhang C	21	11	21

==== Section 2 ====
First round
6	(China) Guo XW (China) Chen FH	21	21
(India) D Kapila (India) T Crasto	11	10
(United States) P Smith (United States) J Gai	19	13
(Indonesia) A Syahnawi (Indonesia) N V Marwah	21	21
SWM	(Chinese Taipei) Ye H-w (Chinese Taipei) N G Chan	21	19	21
(Chinese Taipei) Wu G-x (Chinese Taipei) Lee C-h	19	21	16
PFR	(Chinese Taipei) Liu K-h (Chinese Taipei) Hsu Y-h	21	21	21
(Indonesia) B Setiabudi (Indonesia) M D Oktavianti	11	23	19

Second round
6	(China) Guo XW (China) Chen FH	21	21
(Indonesia) A Syahnawi (Indonesia) N V Marwah	17	9
SWM	(Chinese Taipei) Ye H-w (Chinese Taipei) N G Chan	21	21
PFR	(Chinese Taipei) Liu K-h (Chinese Taipei) Hsu Y-h	13	13

Quarter-finals
6	(China) Guo XW (China) Chen FH	19	22	21
SWM	(Chinese Taipei) Ye H-w (Chinese Taipei) N G Chan	21	20	13

=== Bottom half ===
==== Section 3 ====
First round
(Malaysia) Goh S H (Malaysia) S J Lai	17	21	23
(Indonesia) R N Kusharjanto (Indonesia) G E Widjaja	21	16	21
(South Korea) Kim J-h (South Korea) Jang H-j	11	14
8	(Indonesia) J Hidayatullah (Indonesia) F Pasaribu	21	21
(India) R Kapoor (India) R Gadde	21	21
(Chinese Taipei) Yang P-hs (Chinese Taipei) Hu L-f	14	14
(Germany) M Seidel (Germany) T P Nguyen	21	17	16
4	(France) T Gicquel (France) D Delrue	18	21	21

Second round
(Malaysia) Goh S H (Malaysia) S J Lai	21	21
8	(Indonesia) J Hidayatullah (Indonesia) F Pasaribu	15	19
(India) R Kapoor (India) R Gadde	13	12
4	(France) T Gicquel (France) D Delrue	21	21

Quarter-finals
(Malaysia) Goh S H (Malaysia) S J Lai	21	18	20
4	(France) T Gicquel (France) D Delrue	15	21	22

==== Section 4 ====
First round
(Malaysia) Wong T C (Malaysia) Lim C S	11	17
(China) Gao JX (China) Wei YX	21	21
(Thailand) Pak Teeraratsakul (Thailand) S Taerattanachai	14	14
5	(Denmark) M Christiansen (Denmark) A Bøje	21	21
PFR	(Malaysia) Hoo P R (Malaysia) Lai P J	21	21
(Indonesia) M Faza (Indonesia) A Pranata	17	9
(Japan) Y Shimogami (Japan) S Hobara	21	21	19
2	(Thailand) D Puavaranukroh (Thailand) S Paewsampran	23	19	21

Second round
(China) Gao JX (China) Wei YX	21	14	16
5	(Denmark) M Christiansen (Denmark) A Bøje	16	21	21
PFR	(Malaysia) Hoo P R (Malaysia) Lai P J	14	22
2	(Thailand) D Puavaranukroh (Thailand) S Paewsampran	21	24

Quarter-finals
5	(Denmark) M Christiansen (Denmark) A Bøje	21	14	21
2	(Thailand) D Puavaranukroh (Thailand) S Paewsampran	15	21	18

Preceded by 2026 Singapore Open	BWF World Tour; 2026 BWF season	Succeeded by 2026 Australian Open
