= Cheng Xing =

Chinese badminton player (born 2002)

Cheng Xing 程星
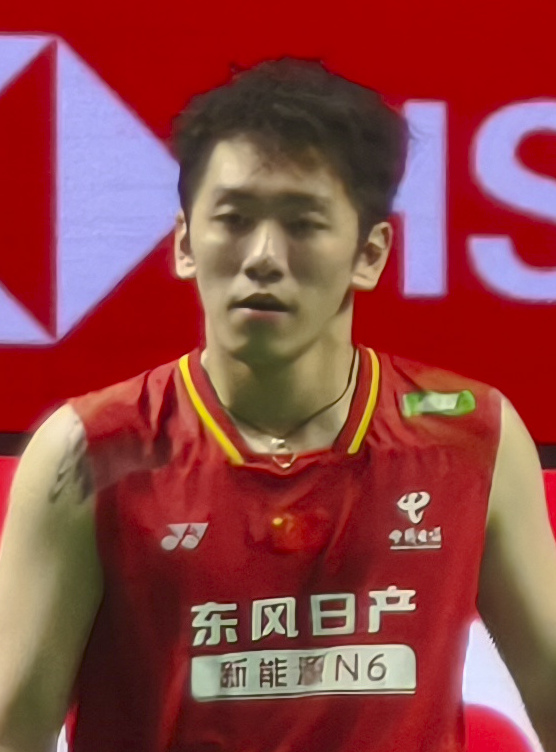
- Cheng at the 2026 Indonesia Open

Personal information
- Born: 7 May 2002 (age 24) Jiujiang, Jiangxi, China
- Height: 1.85 m (6 ft 1 in)

Sport
- Country: China
- Sport: Badminton
- Handedness: Right

Mixed doubles
- Highest ranking: 7 (with Zhang Chi, 8 September 2026)
- Current ranking: 7 (with Zhang Chi, 17 November 2026)
- BWF profile

Cheng Xing (Chinese: 程星; pinyin: Chéng Xīng; born 7 May 2002) is a Chinese badminton player.

== Achievements ==
=== BWF World Tour (3 titles, 4 runners-up) ===
The BWF World Tour, which was announced on 19 March 2017 and implemented in 2018, is a series of elite badminton tournaments sanctioned by the Badminton World Federation (BWF). The BWF World Tour is divided into levels of World Tour Finals, Super 1000, Super 750, Super 500, Super 300, and the BWF Tour Super 100.

Mixed doubles
Year	Tournament	Level	Partner	Opponent	Score	Result
2022	Indonesia Masters	Super 100	(China) Chen Fanghui	(China) Jiang Zhenbang (China) Wei Yaxin	12–21, 15–21	(silver) Runner-up
2023	Ruichang China Masters	Super 100	(China) Chen Fanghui	(China) Jiang Zhenbang (China) Wei Yaxin	15–21, 8–21	(silver) Runner-up
2024	Orléans Masters	Super 300	(China) Zhang Chi	(Indonesia) Rinov Rivaldy (Indonesia) Pitha Haningtyas Mentari	16–21, 21–18, 21–15	(gold) Winner
2024	Spain Masters	Super 300	(China) Zhang Chi	(Indonesia) Rinov Rivaldy (Indonesia) Pitha Haningtyas Mentari	21–17, 12–21, 13–21	(silver) Runner-up
2026	German Open	Super 300	(China) Zhang Chi	(Denmark) Mads Vestergaard (Denmark) Christine Busch	21–12, 21–17	(gold) Winner
2026	Swiss Open	Super 300	(China) Zhang Chi	(China) Zhu Yijun (China) Li Qian	20–22, 21–15, 22–20	(gold) Winner
2026	Indonesia Open	Super 1000	(China) Zhang Chi	(Denmark) Mathias Christiansen (Denmark) Alexandra Bøje	19–21, 21–23	(silver) Runner-up

=== BWF International Challenge/Series (2 titles, 1 runner-up) ===
Mixed doubles
Year	Tournament	Partner	Opponent	Score	Result
2022	Vietnam International Series	(China) Chen Fanghui	(China) Jiang Zhenbang (China) Wei Yaxin	14–21, 11–21	(silver) Runner-up
2022	Malaysia International	(China) Chen Fanghui	(China) Jiang Zhenbang (China) Wei Yaxin	26–24, 21–18	(gold) Winner
2023	China International	(China) Chen Fanghui	(China) Guo Xinwa (China) Li Qian	21–19, 21–14	(gold) Winner

BWF International Challenge tournament
BWF International Series tournament
BWF Future Series tournament
