= Mathias Christiansen =

Danish badminton player (born 1994)

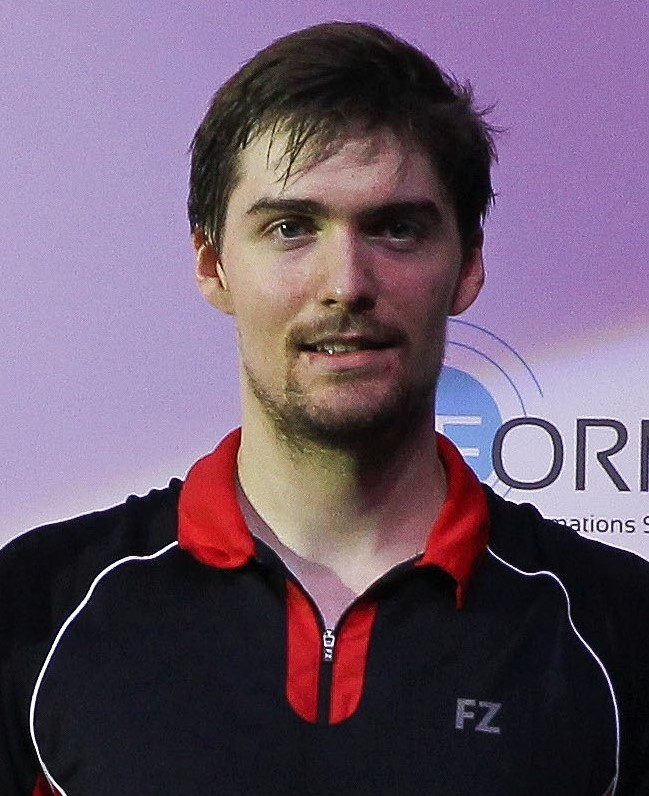
- Christiansen in 2016.

Personal information
- Born: 20 February 1994 (age 32) Bornholm, Denmark
- Years active: 2011–present
- Height: 1.86 m (6 ft 1 in)

Sport
- Country: Denmark
- Sport: Badminton
- Handedness: Right

Men's & mixed doubles
- Highest ranking: 19 (MD with David Daugaard, 21 September 2017); 2 (XD with Alexandra Bøje, 8 September 2026); 4 (XD with Christinna Pedersen, 25 October 2018)
- Current ranking: 4 (XD with Alexandra Bøje, 27 October 2026)
- BWF profile
Medal record
Men's badminton
Representing Denmark
Thomas Cup
Gold medal – first place	2016 Kunshan	Men's team
Bronze medal – third place	2018 Bangkok	Men's team
Bronze medal – third place	2020 Aarhus	Men's team
Bronze medal – third place	2022 Bangkok	Men's team
Bronze medal – third place	2026 Horsens	Men's team
European Games
Bronze medal – third place	2023 Kraków–Małopolska	Mixed doubles
European Championships
Gold medal – first place	2026 Huelva	Mixed doubles
Silver medal – second place	2018 Huelva	Mixed doubles
Silver medal – second place	2024 Saarbrücken	Mixed doubles
Bronze medal – third place	2016 La Roche-sur-Yon	Mixed doubles
Bronze medal – third place	2017 Kolding	Men's doubles
Bronze medal – third place	2021 Kyiv	Mixed doubles
European Mixed Team Championships
Gold medal – first place	2017 Lubin	Mixed team
Gold medal – first place	2019 Copenhagen	Mixed team
Gold medal – first place	2021 Vantaa	Mixed team
Gold medal – first place	2023 Aire-sur-la-Lys	Mixed team
European Men's Team Championships
Gold medal – first place	2016 Kazan	Men's team
Gold medal – first place	2018 Kazan	Men's team
European Junior Championships
Gold medal – first place	2013 Ankara	Mixed team
Silver medal – second place	2013 Ankara	Boys' doubles

Mathias Christiansen (born 20 February 1994) is a Danish badminton player who joined the national team in July 2013. He was the silver medalists in the 2018 and 2024 European Championships, and also the bronze medalists in the 2016, 2017, and 2021 European Championships, as well at the 2023 European Games. He was part of Danish winning team at the 2016 Thomas Cup. He competed at the 2020 Summer Olympics.

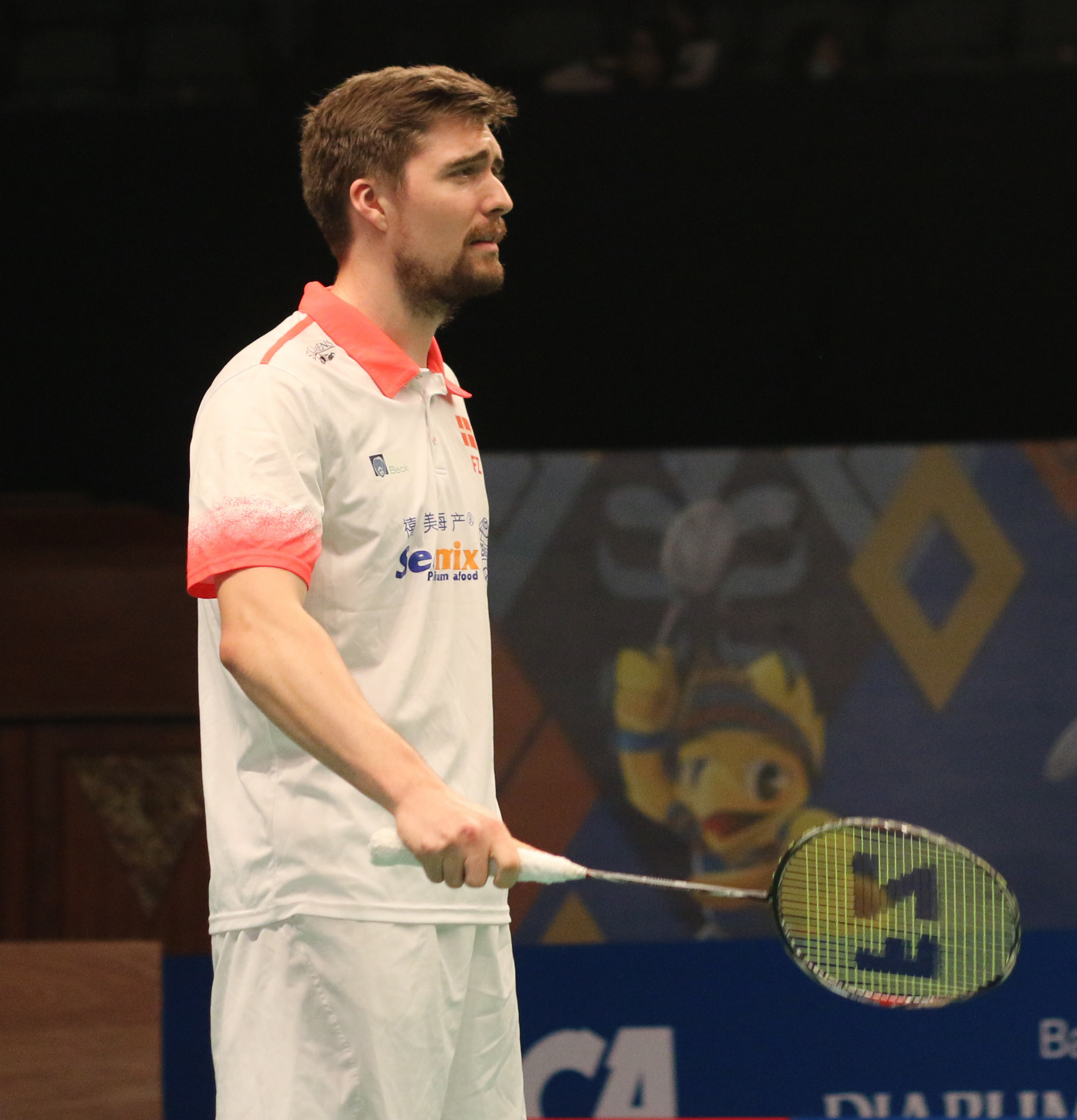
Christiansen at the 2017 Indonesia Open

== Career ==
=== Early career ===
Christiansen was born on 20 February 1994, in Bornholm, Denmark, where his journey into badminton began at a young age in the town of Allinge. His introduction to the sport was quite serendipitous; he started playing after his schoolteacher encouraged him to attend badminton practice. Christiansen's talent quickly became evident, leading him to compete at the international level as a teenager, including a notable debut at the 2011 Scottish International. His early career reached a significant milestone in 2013 when he moved to Copenhagen to join the Danish national team, marking his transition into the professional circuit where he would eventually become a key figure in both men's and mixed doubles.

=== 2017–2019 ===
In 2017, Christiansen and Daugaard secured a bronze medal in the men's doubles at the European Championships and reached a career-high ranking of No. 19 in that category. However, his profile rose significantly in late 2017 when he paired with the legendary Christinna Pedersen. This duo quickly became a global powerhouse, reaching back-to-back finals at the China and Hong Kong Open. In 2018, the pair captured the India Open title and earned a silver medal at the European Championships in Huelva, Spain. Their consistent performance at elite tournaments, including a runner-up finish at the Korea Open, propelled Christiansen to a career-best world ranking of No. 4 in October 2018. Additionally, he helped the national team secure a bronze medal at the 2018 Thomas Cup in Bangkok.

Following Pedersen's retirement from international play in early 2019, Christiansen began his current partnership with Alexandra Bøje. Making their debut at the Canada Open in July, they reached the podium finishing as runners-up in the Hungarian International in November, and then claimed two titles in the Irish and Scottish Open.

=== 2020–2022 ===
Christiansen helping Denmark secure gold at the 2021 European Mixed Team Championships and contributing to back-to-back bronze medals at the 2020 and 2022 Thomas Cup finals. On the individual circuit, Christiansen and Bøje won the bronze medal at the 2021 European Championships. They also captured titles at the 2020 SaarLorLux Open and the 2021 Orléans Masters, reached the finals of the 2021 Swiss and French Open, and made his Olympic debut at the Tokyo 2020 Games. His consistency against the world's best culminated in a career-high world ranking of No. 8 in October 2022.

=== 2023–2024 ===
In 2023, Christiansen and Bøje were in top form, capturing titles at the Spain Masters and the Singapore Open, and securing a bronze medal at the European Games in Poland. This momentum continued into early 2024 as they reached the final of the European Championships in April, earning a silver medal, and were runners-up at the Canada Open in July.

However, just days before the 2024 Paris Olympics, for which they had qualified, Christiansen announced his withdrawal from the Games. The decision followed a series of three unintentional administrative errors in reporting his "whereabouts" to Anti-Doping Denmark over a 12-month period. To avoid disrupting the Danish Olympic team with the pending investigation, Christiansen chose to step down, which eventually resulted in a one-year suspension that lasted until July 2025.

=== 2025–2026 ===
The year 2025 marked a triumphant return to the professional circuit for Christiansen after completing a one-year suspension related to anti-doping whereabouts reporting. Reunited with his longtime partner, Alexandra Bøje, the pair made an immediate impact by winning the Macau Open in their very first tournament back in July. They carried this momentum into the BWF World Championships in Paris, where they pulled off a massive upset against the world No. 1 seeds, Feng Yanzhe and Huang Dongping. Throughout the fall, Christiansen and Bøje continued their high-level play, securing another title at the Hylo Open, and an additional victory at the Indonesia Masters Super 100. By the end of 2025, Christiansen had successfully rehabilitated his world ranking from outside the top 150 back toward the elite tier.

The pair has maintained high-level consistency in 2026, notably reaching the finals of major tournaments such as the India Open and the Indonesia Masters in January. In March, they secured a runner-up finish at the Orléans Masters in France. Two months later, they went on to win their first title of the year at the Thailand Open, beating Chinese pair of Zhu Yijun and Li Qian. This pair then continued their winning streak by grabbing the Singapore Open title by beating the young Japanese pair of Yuichi Shimogami and Sayaka Hobara in three games. The next week, Christiansen and Bøje recorded their biggest win of their career by securing the Indonesia Open title, beating Chinese pair of Cheng Xing and Zhang Chi in the final.

== Achievements ==
=== European Games ===
Mixed doubles
Year	Venue	Partner	Opponent	Score	Result	Ref.
2023	Arena Jaskółka; Tarnów, Poland	(Denmark) Alexandra Bøje	(Netherlands) Robin Tabeling (Netherlands) Selena Piek	14–21, 13–21	Bronze	

=== European Championships ===
Men's doubles
Year	Venue	Partner	Opponent	Score	Result	Ref.
2017	Sydbank Arena; Kolding, Denmark	(Denmark) David Daugaard	(Denmark) Mathias Boe (Denmark) Carsten Mogensen	10–21, 15–21	Bronze	

Mixed doubles
Year	Venue	Partner	Opponent	Score	Result	Ref.
2016	Vendéspace; La Roche-sur-Yon, France	(Denmark) Lena Grebak	(Denmark) Niclas Nøhr (Denmark) Sara Thygesen	21–15, 18–21, 17–21	Bronze	
2018	Palacio de los Deportes Carolina Marín; Huelva, Spain	(Denmark) Christinna Pedersen	(England) Chris Adcock (England) Gabby Adcock	18–21, 21–17, 18–21	Silver	
2021	Palace of Sports; Kyiv, Ukraine	(Denmark) Alexandra Bøje	(England) Marcus Ellis (England) Lauren Smith	17–21, 19–21	Bronze	
2024	Saarlandhalle; Saarbrücken, Germany	(Denmark) Alexandra Bøje	(France) Thom Gicquel (France) Delphine Delrue	16–21, 15–21	Silver	
2026	Palacio de los Deportes Carolina Marín; Huelva, Spain	(Denmark) Alexandra Bøje	(England) Callum Hemming (England) Estelle van Leeuwen	21–19, 21–14	Gold	

=== European Junior Championships ===
Boys' doubles
Year	Venue	Partner	Opponent	Score	Result
2013	Aski Sports Hall; Ankara, Turkey	(Denmark) David Daugaard	(Denmark) Kasper Antonsen (Denmark) Oliver Babic	17–21, 23–25	Silver

=== BWF World Tour (11 titles, 7 runners-up) ===
The BWF World Tour, which was announced on 19 March 2017 and implemented in 2018, is a series of elite badminton tournaments sanctioned by the Badminton World Federation (BWF). The BWF World Tour is divided into levels of World Tour Finals, Super 1000, Super 750, Super 500, Super 300, and the BWF Tour Super 100.

Mixed doubles
Year	Tournament	Level	Partner	Opponent	Score	Result	Ref.
2018	India Open	Super 500	(Denmark) Christinna Pedersen	(Indonesia) Praveen Jordan (Indonesia) Melati Daeva Oktavianti	21–14, 21–15	(gold) Winner	
2018	Korea Open	Super 500	(Denmark) Christinna Pedersen	(China) He Jiting (China) Du Yue	18–21, 16–21	(silver) Runner-up	
2020	SaarLorLux Open	Super 100	(Denmark) Alexandra Bøje	(Germany) Mark Lamsfuß (Germany) Isabel Herttrich	21–15, 19–21, 21–11	(gold) Winner	
2021	Swiss Open	Super 300	(Denmark) Alexandra Bøje	(France) Thom Gicquel (France) Delphine Delrue	19–21, 19–21	(silver) Runner-up	
2021	Orléans Masters	Super 100	(Denmark) Alexandra Bøje	(Denmark) Niclas Nøhr (Denmark) Amalie Magelund	21–13, 21–17	(gold) Winner	
2021	French Open	Super 750	(Denmark) Alexandra Bøje	(Japan) Yuta Watanabe (Japan) Arisa Higashino	8–21, 17–21	(silver) Runner-up	
2023	Spain Masters	Super 300	(Denmark) Alexandra Bøje	(Indonesia) Praveen Jordan (Indonesia) Melati Daeva Oktavianti	22–20, 21–18	(gold) Winner	
2023	Singapore Open	Super 750	(Denmark) Alexandra Bøje	(Japan) Yuta Watanabe (Japan) Arisa Higashino	21–14, 20–22, 21–16	(gold) Winner	
2024	Canada Open	Super 500	(Denmark) Alexandra Bøje	(Denmark) Jesper Toft (Denmark) Amalie Magelund	21–9, 22–24, 12–21	(silver) Runner-up	
2025	Macau Open	Super 300	(Denmark) Alexandra Bøje	(Malaysia) Jimmy Wong (Malaysia) Lai Pei Jing	21–13, 21–16	(gold) Winner	
2025 (I)	Indonesia Masters Super 100	Super 100	(Denmark) Alexandra Bøje	(Malaysia) Jimmy Wong (Malaysia) Lai Pei Jing	13–21, 23–21, 21–14	(gold) Winner	
2025	Hylo Open	Super 500	(Denmark) Alexandra Bøje	(France) Thom Gicquel (France) Delphine Delrue	23–21, 21–15	(gold) Winner	
2026	India Open	Super 750	(Denmark) Alexandra Bøje	(Thailand) Dechapol Puavaranukroh (Thailand) Supissara Paewsampran	21–19, 23–25, 18–21	(silver) Runner-up	
2026	Indonesia Masters	Super 500	(Denmark) Alexandra Bøje	(Malaysia) Chen Tang Jie (Malaysia) Toh Ee Wei	21–15, 17–21, 11–21	(silver) Runner-up	
2026	Orléans Masters	Super 300	(Denmark) Alexandra Bøje	(France) Thom Gicquel (France) Delphine Delrue	19–21, 13–21	(silver) Runner-up	
2026	Thailand Open	Super 500	(Denmark) Alexandra Bøje	(China) Zhu Yijun (China) Li Qian	21–17, 21–15	(gold) Winner	
2026	Singapore Open	Super 750	(Denmark) Alexandra Bøje	(Japan) Yuichi Shimogami (Japan) Sayaka Hobara	17–21, 21–12, 21–12	(gold) Winner	
2026	Indonesia Open	Super 1000	(Denmark) Alexandra Bøje	(China) Cheng Xing (China) Zhang Chi	21–19, 23–21	(gold) Winner	

=== BWF Superseries (2 runners-up) ===
The BWF Superseries, which was launched on 14 December 2006 and implemented in 2007, was a series of elite badminton tournaments, sanctioned by the Badminton World Federation (BWF). BWF Superseries levels were Superseries and Superseries Premier. A season of Superseries consisted of twelve tournaments around the world that had been introduced since 2011. Successful players were invited to the Superseries Finals, which were held at the end of each year.

Mixed doubles
Year	Tournament	Partner	Opponent	Score	Result	Ref.
2017	China Open	(Denmark) Christinna Pedersen	(China) Zheng Siwei (China) Huang Yaqiong	15–21, 11–21	(silver) Runner-up	
2017	Hong Kong Open	(Denmark) Christinna Pedersen	(China) Zheng Siwei (China) Huang Yaqiong	15–21, 13–21	(silver) Runner-up	

BWF Super Series Premier tournament
BWF Super Series tournament

=== BWF Grand Prix (3 titles, 1 runner-up) ===
The BWF Grand Prix had two levels, the Grand Prix and Grand Prix Gold. It was a series of badminton tournaments sanctioned by the Badminton World Federation (BWF) and played between 2007 and 2017.

Men's doubles
Year	Tournament	Partner	Opponent	Score	Result
2014	Scottish Open	(Denmark) David Daugaard	(Germany) Raphael Beck (Germany) Andreas Heinz	21–13, 21–17	(gold) Winner
2016	Dutch Open	(Denmark) David Daugaard	(Chinese Taipei) Lee Jhe-huei (Chinese Taipei) Lee Yang	17–21, 17–21	(silver) Runner-up
2016	Scottish Open	(Denmark) David Daugaard	(Scotland) Adam Hall (England) Peter Mills	15–21, 21–19, 21–15	(gold) Winner

Mixed doubles
Year	Tournament	Partner	Opponent	Score	Result
2016	Dutch Open	(Denmark) Sara Thygesen	(Denmark) Søren Gravholt (Denmark) Maiken Fruergaard	21–18, 20–22, 21–16	(gold) Winner

BWF Grand Prix tournament

=== BWF International Challenge/Series (13 titles, 5 runners-up) ===
Men's doubles
Year	Tournament	Partner	Opponent	Score	Result
2014	Croatian International	(Denmark) David Daugaard	(Denmark) Theodor Johansen (Denmark) Mads Pedersen	21–8, 21–12	(gold) Winner
2014	Hellas International	(Denmark) David Daugaard	(Denmark) Frederik Colberg (Denmark) Mikkel Mikkelsen	0–0 retired	(gold) Winner
2014	Belgian International	(Denmark) David Daugaard	(Netherlands) Jacco Arends (Netherlands) Jelle Maas	11–10, 6–11, 8–11, 11–7, 11–9	(gold) Winner
2015	Finnish Open	(Denmark) David Daugaard	(England) Andrew Ellis (England) Peter Mills	19–21, 12–21	(silver) Runner-up
2015	Italian International	(Denmark) David Daugaard	(Denmark) Kasper Antonsen (Denmark) Niclas Nøhr	22–24, 14–21	(silver) Runner-up
2016	Swedish Masters	(Denmark) David Daugaard	(Denmark) Kim Astrup (Denmark) Anders Skaarup Rasmussen	21–19, 21–23, 21–19	(gold) Winner
2016	Finnish Open	(Denmark) David Daugaard	(Poland) Adam Cwalina (Poland) Przemysław Wacha	21–23, 21–12, 21–12	(gold) Winner
2016	Spanish International	(Denmark) David Daugaard	(Japan) Takuro Hoki (Japan) Yugo Kobayashi	10–21, 6–21	(silver) Runner-up

Mixed doubles
Year	Tournament	Partner	Opponent	Score	Result
2015	Orléans International	(Denmark) Lena Grebak	(Malaysia) Chan Peng Soon (Malaysia) Goh Liu Ying	11–21, 21–17, 21–19	(gold) Winner
2015	Irish Open	(Denmark) Lena Grebak	(Poland) Robert Mateusiak (Poland) Nadieżda Zięba	19–21, 21–18, 21–18	(gold) Winner
2016	Swedish Masters	(Denmark) Lena Grebak	(Poland) Robert Mateusiak (Poland) Nadieżda Zięba	10–21, 13–21	(silver) Runner-up
2016	Austrian Open	(Denmark) Lena Grebak	(England) Matthew Nottingham (England) Emily Westwood	21–17, 21–17	(gold) Winner
2016	Orléans International	(Denmark) Lena Grebak	(Netherlands) Robin Tabeling (Netherlands) Samantha Barning	21–14, 21–13	(gold) Winner
2016	Finnish Open	(Denmark) Lena Grebak	(Denmark) Niclas Nøhr (Denmark) Sara Thygesen	18–21, 23–21, 21–16	(gold) Winner
2016	Irish Open	(Denmark) Sara Thygesen	(Netherlands) Robin Tabeling (Netherlands) Cheryl Seinen	21–16, 21–16	(gold) Winner
2019	Hungarian International	(Denmark) Alexandra Bøje	(South Korea) Kim Sa-rang (South Korea) Kim Ha-na	12–21, 15–21	(silver) Runner-up
2019	Irish Open	(Denmark) Alexandra Bøje	(France) Ronan Labar (France) Anne Tran	21–12, 21–19	(gold) Winner
2019	Scottish Open	(Denmark) Alexandra Bøje	(Denmark) Mathias Bay-Smidt (Denmark) Rikke Søby Hansen	23–21, 21–16	(gold) Winner

BWF International Challenge tournament
BWF International Series tournament
