= Alexandra Bøje =

Danish badminton player (born 1999)

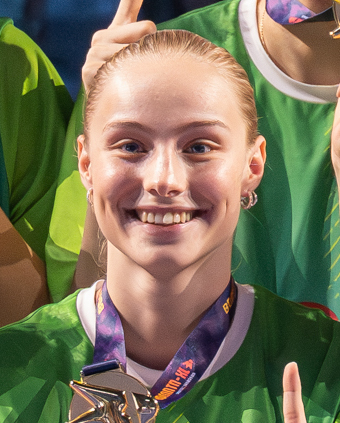
- Bøje in 2024

Personal information
- Born: 6 December 1999 (age 26) Horsens, Denmark
- Height: 1.73 m (5 ft 8 in)

Sport
- Country: Denmark
- Sport: Badminton
- Handedness: Right

Women's & mixed doubles
- Highest ranking: 29 (WD with Mette Poulsen, 23 March 2021); 2 (XD with Mathias Christiansen, 8 September 2026)
- Current ranking: 4 (XD with Mathias Christiansen, 27 October 2026)
- BWF profile
Medal record
Women's badminton
Representing Denmark
European Games
Bronze medal – third place	2023 Kraków–Małopolska	Mixed doubles
European Championships
Gold medal – first place	2026 Huelva	Mixed doubles
Silver medal – second place	2024 Saarbrücken	Mixed doubles
Bronze medal – third place	2021 Kyiv	Mixed doubles
European Mixed Team Championships
Gold medal – first place	2019 Copenhagen	Mixed team
Gold medal – first place	2021 Vantaa	Mixed team
Gold medal – first place	2025 Baku	Mixed team
European Women's Team Championships
Gold medal – first place	2020 Liévin	Women's team
Gold medal – first place	2024 Łódź	Women's team
Silver medal – second place	2026 Istanbul	Women's team
European Junior Championships
Silver medal – second place	2017 Mulhouse	Girls' doubles
Bronze medal – third place	2017 Mulhouse	Mixed team

Alexandra Bøje (born 6 December 1999) is a Danish badminton player. She won her first senior international title at the 2016 Czech International in the mixed doubles event partnered with Mathias Bay-Smidt after fight through the qualification round, with the eight matches played. She was part of the national team that clinched the gold medals at the 2019 European Mixed Team and 2020 Women's Team Championships. She competed at the 2020 Summer Olympics.

In 2021, Alexandra Bøje and Mette Poulsen were both banned by Badminton Denmark for three months from all national and international tournaments due to their conduct during the finals of the 2021 Danish national championships.

== Achievements ==
=== European Games ===
Mixed doubles
Year	Venue	Partner	Opponent	Score	Result
2023	Arena Jaskółka; Tarnów, Poland	(Denmark) Mathias Christiansen	(Netherlands) Robin Tabeling (Netherlands) Selena Piek	14–21, 13–21	Bronze

=== European Championships ===
Mixed doubles
Year	Venue	Partner	Opponent	Score	Result
2021	Palace of Sports, Kyiv, Ukraine	(Denmark) Mathias Christiansen	(England) Marcus Ellis (England) Lauren Smith	17–21, 19–21	Bronze
2024	Saarlandhalle, Saarbrücken, Germany	(Denmark) Mathias Christiansen	(France) Thom Gicquel (France) Delphine Delrue	16–21, 15–21	Silver
2026	Palacio de los Deportes Carolina Marín, Huelva, Spain	(Denmark) Mathias Christiansen	(England) Callum Hemming (England) Estelle van Leeuwen	21–19, 21–14	Gold

=== European Junior Championships ===
Girls' doubles
Year	Venue	Partner	Opponent	Score	Result
2017	Centre Sportif Régional d'Alsace; Mulhouse, France	(Denmark) Julie Dawall Jakobsen	(Sweden) Emma Karlsson (Sweden) Johanna Magnusson	14–21, 14–21	Silver

=== BWF World Tour (11 titles, 6 runners-up) ===
The BWF World Tour, which was announced on 19 March 2017 and implemented in 2018, is a series of elite badminton tournaments sanctioned by the Badminton World Federation (BWF). The BWF World Tour is divided into levels of World Tour Finals, Super 1000, Super 750, Super 500, Super 300, and the BWF Tour Super 100.

Mixed doubles
Year	Tournament	Level	Partner	Opponent	Score	Result
2020	SaarLorLux Open	Super 100	(Denmark) Mathias Christiansen	(Germany) Mark Lamsfuß (Germany) Isabel Herttrich	21–15, 19–21, 21–11	(gold) Winner
2021	Swiss Open	Super 300	(Denmark) Mathias Christiansen	(France) Thom Gicquel (France) Delphine Delrue	19–21, 19–21	(silver) Runner-up
2021	Orléans Masters	Super 100	(Denmark) Mathias Christiansen	(Denmark) Niclas Nøhr (Denmark) Amalie Magelund	21–13, 21–17	(gold) Winner
2021	French Open	Super 750	(Denmark) Mathias Christiansen	(Japan) Yuta Watanabe (Japan) Arisa Higashino	8–21, 17–21	(silver) Runner-up
2023	Spain Masters	Super 300	(Denmark) Mathias Christiansen	(Indonesia) Praveen Jordan (Indonesia) Melati Daeva Oktavianti	22–20, 21–18	(gold) Winner
2023	Singapore Open	Super 750	(Denmark) Mathias Christiansen	(Japan) Yuta Watanabe (Japan) Arisa Higashino	21–14, 20–22, 21–16	(gold) Winner
2024	Canada Open	Super 500	(Denmark) Mathias Christiansen	(Denmark) Jesper Toft (Denmark) Amalie Magelund	21–9, 22–24, 12–21	(silver) Runner-up
2025	German Open	Super 300	(Netherlands) Robin Tabeling	(Indonesia) Rehan Naufal Kusharjanto (Indonesia) Gloria Emanuelle Widjaja	21–17, 21–12	(gold) Winner
2025	Macau Open	Super 300	(Denmark) Mathias Christiansen	(Malaysia) Jimmy Wong (Malaysia) Lai Pei Jing	21–13, 21–16	(gold) Winner
2025 (I)	Indonesia Masters Super 100	Super 100	(Denmark) Mathias Christiansen	(Malaysia) Jimmy Wong (Malaysia) Lai Pei Jing	13–21, 23–21, 21–14	(gold) Winner
2025	Hylo Open	Super 500	(Denmark) Mathias Christiansen	(France) Thom Gicquel (France) Delphine Delrue	23–21, 21–15	(gold) Winner
2026	India Open	Super 750	(Denmark) Mathias Christiansen	(Thailand) Dechapol Puavaranukroh (Thailand) Supissara Paewsampran	21–19, 23–25, 18–21	(silver) Runner-up
2026	Indonesia Masters	Super 500	(Denmark) Mathias Christiansen	(Malaysia) Chen Tang Jie (Malaysia) Toh Ee Wei	21–15, 17–21, 11–21	(silver) Runner-up
2026	Orléans Masters	Super 300	(Denmark) Mathias Christiansen	(France) Thom Gicquel (France) Delphine Delrue	19–21, 13–21	(silver) Runner-up
2026	Thailand Open	Super 500	(Denmark) Mathias Christiansen	(China) Zhu Yijun (China) Li Qian	21–17, 21–15	(gold) Winner
2026	Singapore Open	Super 750	(Denmark) Mathias Christiansen	(Japan) Yuichi Shimogami (Japan) Sayaka Hobara	17–21, 21–12, 21–12	(gold) Winner
2026	Indonesia Open	Super 1000	(Denmark) Mathias Christiansen	(China) Cheng Xing (China) Zhang Chi	21–19, 23–21	(gold) Winner

=== BWF International Challenge/Series (5 titles, 9 runners-up) ===
Women's doubles
Year	Tournament	Partner	Opponent	Score	Result
2015	Hungarian International	(Denmark) Gabriella Bøje	(Malaysia) Cheah Yee See (Malaysia) Chin Kah Mun	14–21, 20–22	(silver) Runner-up
2017	Swedish International	(Denmark) Lena Grebak	(Sweden) Clara Nistad (Sweden) Emma Wengberg	17–21, 22–24	(silver) Runner-up
2017	Norwegian International	(Denmark) Sara Lundgaard	(Denmark) Isabella Nielsen (Denmark) Claudia Paredes	21–19, 21–9	(gold) Winner
2017	Italian International	(Denmark) Sara Lundgaard	(Russia) Ekaterina Bolotova (Russia) Alina Davletova	18–21, 11–21	(silver) Runner-up
2019	Polish Open	(Denmark) Mette Poulsen	(Japan) Chisato Hoshi (Japan) Aoi Matsuda	18–21, 21–15, 17–21	(silver) Runner-up
2019	Dubai International	(Denmark) Mette Poulsen	(Japan) Rin Iwanaga (Japan) Kie Nakanishi	21–18, 15–21, 17–21	(silver) Runner-up

Mixed doubles
Year	Tournament	Partner	Opponent	Score	Result
2016	Czech International	(Denmark) Mathias Bay-Smidt	(Russia) Vasily Kuznetsov (Russia) Ekaterina Bolotova	21–19, 21–15	(gold) Winner
2016	Norwegian International	(Denmark) Mathias Bay-Smidt	(Finland) Anton Kaisti (Finland) Jenny Nyström	12–21, 12–21	(silver) Runner-up
2017	Swedish International	(Denmark) Mathias Bay-Smidt	(Denmark) Mikkel Mikkelsen (Denmark) Mai Surrow	18–21, 14–21	(silver) Runner-up
2017	Czech Open	(Denmark) Mathias Bay-Smidt	(France) Bastian Kersaudy (France) Léa Palermo	12–21, 21–8, 21–18	(gold) Winner
2017	Norwegian International	(Denmark) Lasse Mølhede	(England) Gregory Mairs (England) Jenny Moore	11–21, 21–19, 11–21	(silver) Runner-up
2019	Hungarian International	(Denmark) Mathias Christiansen	(South Korea) Kim Sa-rang (South Korea) Kim Ha-na	12–21, 15–21	(silver) Runner-up
2019	Irish Open	(Denmark) Mathias Christiansen	(France) Ronan Labar (France) Anne Tran	21–12, 21–19	(gold) Winner
2019	Scottish Open	(Denmark) Mathias Christiansen	(Denmark) Mathias Bay-Smidt (Denmark) Rikke Søby Hansen	23–21, 21–16	(gold) Winner

BWF International Challenge tournament
BWF International Series tournament
BWF Future Series tournament
