= Chang Ching-hui =

Taiwanese politician (1942–2022)

Chang Ching-hui MLY
- 張慶惠

Member of the Legislative Yuan
- In office 1 February 2005 – 31 January 2008
- Constituency: National at-large

Personal details
- Born: 19 June 1942 Shinchiku Prefecture, Taiwan, Empire of Japan (now Taoyuan, Taiwan)
- Died: 19 August 2022 (aged 80)
- Party: Democratic Progressive Party
- Spouse: Wei Ting-chao (m. 1977–1999)
- Education: Shih Chien University (BS); Tamkang University (MA)
- Profession: Teacher

Chang Ching-hui (Chinese: 張慶惠; 19 June 1942 – 19 August 2022) was a Taiwanese politician. She served one term in the Legislative Yuan, from 2005 to 2008.

== Early life and education ==
Chang was of Hakka descent. After graduating from Taipei Municipal Zhongshan Girls High School, she obtained a bachelor's degree from Shih Chien University and earned a master's degree from Tamkang University. Afterwards, she became a teacher.

She married political activist Wei Ting-chao in 1977. He had been imprisoned in the 1960s due to his association with Peng Ming-min and Roger Hsieh. He was jailed again after the Kaohsiung Incident in 1979. Released in May 1987, Wei died in December 1999 of a heart attack. Wei and Chang's daughter Wei Yun is also a politician.

== Political career ==
Chang represented the Democratic Progressive Party in the 2004 elections and won a seat in the Legislative Yuan via proportional representation. Near the end of her term, Chang served on the Home and Nations Committee. She advocated for the legislature to pass a bill similar to Jessica's Law in March 2007, and stated in June that Chinese spouses of Taiwanese nationals should continue to be granted citizenship after eight years of residency, not four, considering the state of national security, Cross-Strait relations, and population density.

== Death ==
Chang died on 19 August 2022, at the age of 80.
