= Chen Fanghui =

Chinese badminton player (born 2000)

Chen Fanghui 陈芳卉
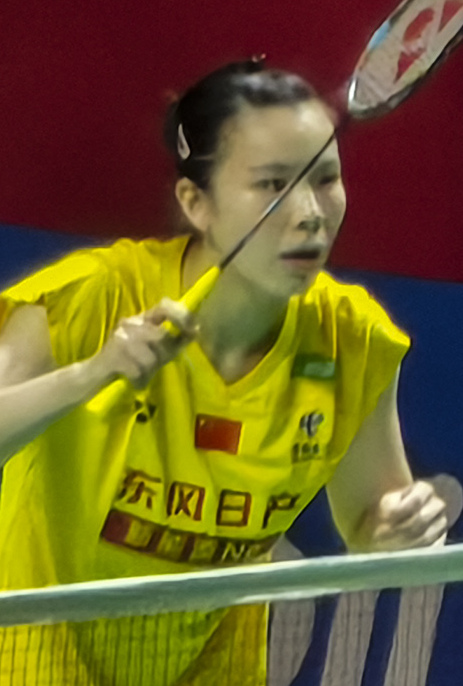
- Chen at the 2026 Indonesia Open

Personal information
- Born: 18 April 2000 (age 26) Zhuzhou, Hunan, China

Sport
- Country: China
- Sport: Badminton
- Handedness: Right

Mixed doubles
- Highest ranking: 5 (with Guo Xinwa, 18 March 2025)
- Current ranking: 5 (with Guo Xinwa, 17 November 2026)
- BWF profile
Medal record
Women's badminton
Representing China
World Championships
Bronze medal – third place	2025 Paris	Mixed doubles

Chen Fanghui (simplified Chinese: 陈芳卉; traditional Chinese: 陳芳卉; pinyin: Chén Fānghuì; born 18 April 2000) is a Chinese badminton player. She reached her first BWF World Tour final at the 2023 Spain Masters.

== Achievements ==
=== World Championships ===
Mixed doubles
Year	Venue	Partner	Opponent	Score	Result
2025	Adidas Arena, Paris, France	(China) Guo Xinwa	(China) Jiang Zhenbang (China) Wei Yaxin	21–11, 21–23, 18–21	Bronze

=== BWF World Tour (5 titles, 7 runners-up) ===
The BWF World Tour, which was announced on 19 March 2017 and implemented in 2018, is a series of elite badminton tournaments sanctioned by the Badminton World Federation (BWF). The BWF World Tour is divided into levels of World Tour Finals, Super 1000, Super 750, Super 500, Super 300, and the BWF Tour Super 100.

Women's doubles
Year	Tournament	Level	Partner	Opponent	Score	Result
2023	Spain Masters	Super 300	(China) Du Yue	(China) Liu Shengshu (China) Tan Ning	8–21, 21–16, 18–21	(silver) Runner-up

Mixed doubles
Year	Tournament	Level	Partner	Opponent	Score	Result
2022	Indonesia Masters	Super 100	(China) Cheng Xing	(China) Jiang Zhenbang (China) Wei Yaxin	12–21, 15–21	(silver) Runner-up
2023	Ruichang China Masters	Super 100	(China) Cheng Xing	(China) Jiang Zhenbang (China) Wei Yaxin	15–21, 8–21	(silver) Runner-up
2024	Thailand Open	Super 500	(China) Guo Xinwa	(Thailand) Dechapol Puavaranukroh (Thailand) Sapsiree Taerattanachai	12–21, 21–12, 21–18	(gold) Winner
2024	Australian Open	Super 500	(China) Guo Xinwa	(China) Jiang Zhenbang (China) Wei Yaxin	12–21, 21–16, 12–21	(silver) Runner-up
2024	Macau Open	Super 300	(China) Guo Xinwa	(Indonesia) Dejan Ferdinansyah (Indonesia) Gloria Emanuelle Widjaja	21–15, 21–18	(gold) Winner
2024	Korea Masters	Super 300	(China) Guo Xinwa	(Indonesia) Dejan Ferdinansyah (Indonesia) Gloria Emanuelle Widjaja	21–10, 21–12	(gold) Winner
2025	Indonesia Masters	Super 500	(China) Guo Xinwa	(Japan) Hiroki Midorikawa (Japan) Natsu Saito	15–21, 17–21	(silver) Runner-up
2025	All England Open	Super 1000	(China) Guo Xinwa	(China) Feng Yanzhe (China) Wei Yaxin	21–16, 10–21, 23–21	(gold) Winner
2025	Hong Kong Open	Super 500	(China) Guo Xinwa	(China) Feng Yanzhe (China) Huang Dongping	14–21, 14–21	(silver) Runner-up
2026	Australian Open	Super 500	(China) Guo Xinwa	(China) Feng Yanzhe (China) Huang Dongping	17–21, 19–21	(silver) Runner-up
2026	China Open	Super 1000	(China) Guo Xinwa	(China) Feng Yanzhe (China) Huang Dongping	25–23, 20–22, 15–21	(gold) Winner

=== BWF International Challenge/Series (2 titles, 1 runner-up) ===
Mixed doubles
Year	Tournament	Partner	Opponent	Score	Result	Ref.
2022	Vietnam International Series	(China) Cheng Xing	(China) Jiang Zhenbang (China) Wei Yaxin	14–21, 11–21	(silver) Runner-up	
2022	Malaysia International	(China) Cheng Xing	(China) Jiang Zhenbang (China) Wei Yaxin	26–24, 21–18	(gold) Winner	
2023	China International	(China) Cheng Xing	(China) Guo Xinwa (China) Li Qian	21–19, 21–14	(gold) Winner	

BWF International Challenge tournament
BWF International Series tournament
BWF Future Series tournament
