= 2015 Badminton Asia Junior Championships – Teams event =

Badminton championship in Bangkok, Thailand

Teams event at the 2015 Badminton Asia Junior Championships
- Venue: CPB Badminton and Sports Science Training Center
- Location: Bangkok, Thailand
- Dates: 28 June – 1 July 2015

The team tournament at the 2015 Badminton Asia Junior Championships took place from 28 June to 1 July 2015 at the CPB Badminton and Sports Science Training Center in Bangkok, Thailand. A total of 18 countries competed in this event.

== Group stage ==
=== Group A ===
Pos	Team	Pld	W	L	MF	MA	MD	GF	GA	GD	PF	PA	PD	Pts	Qualification	People's Republic of China	Hong Kong	Chinese Taipei for Olympic games	Sri Lanka	Kazakhstan
1	China	4	4	0	20	0	+20	40	1	+39	859	371	+488	4	Advance to knockout stage	—	5–0	5–0	5–0	5–0
2	Hong Kong	4	3	1	13	7	+6	28	15	+13	779	630	+149	3	Advance to knockout stage		—	3–2	5–0	5–0
3	Chinese Taipei	4	2	2	12	8	+4	25	17	+8	756	566	+190	2				—	5–0	5–0
4	Sri Lanka	4	1	3	5	15	−10	10	30	−20	461	704	−243	1					—	5–0
5	Kazakhstan	4	0	4	0	20	−20	0	40	−40	256	840	−584	0						—

Source: BadmintonCN

==== China vs Kazakhstan ====
China
5
CPB Badminton and Sports Science Training Center, Court 3
28 June 2015, 09:00 UTC+7

Kazakhstan
0

			1	2	3
1	(China) (Kazakhstan)	Han Chengkai / An Yu; Oleg Yermakov / Madina Smagulova	21; 1	21; 3
2	(China) (Kazakhstan)	Sun Feixiang; Ikramzhan Yuldashev	21; 4	21; 5
3	(China) (Kazakhstan)	He Bingjiao; Diana Fakhrutdinova	21; 4	21; 13
4	(China) (Kazakhstan)	Tan Qiang / Zhou Haodong; Oleg Yermakov / Ikramzhan Yuldashev	21; 5	21; 5
5	(China) (Kazakhstan)	Chen Qingchen / Jia Yifan; Diana Fakhrutdinova / Madina Smagulova	21; 3	21; 5

==== Chinese Taipei vs Sri Lanka ====
Chinese Taipei
5
CPB Badminton and Sports Science Training Center, Court 4
28 June 2015, 09:00 UTC+7

Sri Lanka
0

			1	2	3
1	(Chinese Taipei) (Sri Lanka)	Lu Chia-hung; Dakshika Gunatilleke	21; 8	21; 9
2	(Chinese Taipei) (Sri Lanka)	Hsu Wen-chi; Thanushi Ratnayaka	21; 7	21; 3
3	(Chinese Taipei) (Sri Lanka)	Po Li-wei / Yang Ming-tse; Dakshika Gunatilleke / Mahen Samaranayake	21; 8	21; 13
4	(Chinese Taipei) (Sri Lanka)	Chao Pin-chi / Chiang Ya-ting; Hasini Ambalangodage / Mahesha Geethmi Abeyrathne	21; 5	21; 6
5	(Chinese Taipei) (Sri Lanka)	Po Li-wei / Chen Wan-ting; Mahen Samaranayake / Yasmitha Dayarathne	21; 12	21; 8

==== Hong Kong vs Kazakhstan ====
Hong Kong
5
CPB Badminton and Sports Science Training Center, Court 3
28 June 2015, 13:00 UTC+7

Kazakhstan
0

			1	2	3
1	(Hong Kong) (Kazakhstan)	Li Kuen Hon / Yeung Nga Ting; Ikramzhan Yuldashev / Diana Fakhrutdinova	21; 12	21; 9
2	(Hong Kong) (Kazakhstan)	Chan Yin Chak; Oleg Yermakov	21; 4	21; 5
3	(Hong Kong) (Kazakhstan)	Yeung Sum Yee; Madina Smagulova	21; 4	21; 9
4	(Hong Kong) (Kazakhstan)	Yonny Chung / Lam Wai Lok; Oleg Yermakov / Ikramzhan Yuldashev	21; 8	21; 11
5	(Hong Kong) (Kazakhstan)	Chow King Ling / Fan Ka Yan; Diana Fakhrutdinova / Madina Smagulova	21; 10	21; 9

==== China vs Sri Lanka ====
China
5
CPB Badminton and Sports Science Training Center, Court 4
28 June 2015, 13:00 UTC+7

Sri Lanka
0

			1	2	3
1	(China) (Sri Lanka)	Lin Guipu; Mahen Samaranayake	21; 7	21; 10
2	(China) (Sri Lanka)	Chen Yufei; Kavindika de Silva	21; 5	21; 3
3	(China) (Sri Lanka)	Tan Qiang / Zheng Siwei; Dakshika Gunatilleke / Mahen Samaranayake	21; 9	21; 9
4	(China) (Sri Lanka)	Du Yue / Li Yinhui; Buthmi Galagamage / Dilmi Dias	21; 3	21; 4
5	(China) (Sri Lanka)	He Jiting / An Yu; Dakshika Gunatilleke / Yasmitha Dayarathne	21; 9	21; 9

==== Chinese Taipei vs Kazakhstan ====
Chinese Taipei
5
CPB Badminton and Sports Science Training Center, Court 4
28 June 2015, 17:00 UTC+7

Kazakhstan
0

			1	2	3
1	(Chinese Taipei) (Kazakhstan)	Hung Tzu-wei / Jhou Shih-jyun; Oleg Yermakov / Madina Smagulova	21; 4	21; 6
2	(Chinese Taipei) (Kazakhstan)	Chen Chun-wei; Ikramzhan Yuldashev	21; 12	21; 3
3	(Chinese Taipei) (Kazakhstan)	Chen Su-yu; Diana Fakhrutdinova	21; 6	21; 6
4	(Chinese Taipei) (Kazakhstan)	Hung Tzu-wei / Lin Yu-feng; Oleg Yermakov / Ikramzhan Yuldashev	21; 0	21; 4
5	(Chinese Taipei) (Kazakhstan)	Chen Wan-ting / Jhou Shih-jyun; Diana Fakhrutdinova / Madina Smagulova	21; 5	21; 7

==== China vs Hong Kong ====
China
5
CPB Badminton and Sports Science Training Center, Court 4
29 June 2015, 09:00 UTC+7

Hong Kong
0

			1	2	3
1	(China) (Hong Kong)	Zheng Siwei / Chen Qingchen; Yonny Chung / Ng Tsz Yau	21; 7	21; 13
2	(China) (Hong Kong)	Ye Binghong; Leung Ka Yau	21; 18	21; 16
3	(China) (Hong Kong)	He Jiting / Tan Qiang; Yonny Chung / Li Kuen Hon	19; 21	21; 11	21; 8
4	(China) (Hong Kong)	He Bingjiao; Yau Mau Ying	21; 6	21; 14
5	(China) (Hong Kong)	Du Yue / Li Yinhui; Ng Tsz Yau / Yeung Nga Ting	21; 14	21; 7

==== China vs Hong Kong ====
China
5
CPB Badminton and Sports Science Training Center, Court 4
29 June 2015, 09:00 UTC+7

Hong Kong
0

			1	2	3
1	(China) (Hong Kong)	Zheng Siwei / Chen Qingchen; Yonny Chung / Ng Tsz Yau	21; 7	21; 13
2	(China) (Hong Kong)	Ye Binghong; Leung Ka Yau	21; 18	21; 16
3	(China) (Hong Kong)	He Jiting / Tan Qiang; Yonny Chung / Li Kuen Hon	19; 21	21; 11	21; 8
4	(China) (Hong Kong)	He Bingjiao; Yau Mau Ying	21; 6	21; 14
5	(China) (Hong Kong)	Du Yue / Li Yinhui; Ng Tsz Yau / Yeung Nga Ting	21; 14	21; 7

==== Chinese Taipei vs Hong Kong ====
Chinese Taipei
2
CPB Badminton and Sports Science Training Center, Court 4
29 June 2015, 13:00 UTC+7

Hong Kong
3

			1	2	3
1	(Chinese Taipei) (Hong Kong)	Po Li-wei / Chen Wan-ting; Yonny Chung / Ng Tsz Yau	16; 21	16; 21
2	(Chinese Taipei) (Hong Kong)	Lu Chia-hung; Leung Ka Yau	19; 21	21; 16	21; 9
3	(Chinese Taipei) (Hong Kong)	Po Li-wei / Yang Ming-tse; Yonny Chung / Li Kuen Hon	21; 18	21; 16
4	(Chinese Taipei) (Hong Kong)	Chen Su-yu; Yeung Sum Yee	20; 22	17; 21
5	(Chinese Taipei) (Hong Kong)	Jhou Shih-jyun / Chen Wan-ting; Yeung Nga Ting / Ng Tsz Yau	9; 21	21; 17	14; 14

==== Sri Lanka vs Kazakhstan ====
Sri Lanka
5
CPB Badminton and Sports Science Training Center, Court 1
29 June 2015, 13:00 UTC+7

Kazakhstan
0

			1	2	3
1	(Sri Lanka) (Kazakhstan)	Mahen Samaranayake / Yasmitha Dayarathne; Oleg Yermakov / Diana Fakhrutdinova	21; 4	21; 10
2	(Sri Lanka) (Kazakhstan)	Dakshika Gunatilleke; Ikramzhan Yuldashev	21; 11	21; 2
3	(Sri Lanka) (Kazakhstan)	Dilmi Dias; Madina Smagulova	21; 5	21; 7
4	(Sri Lanka) (Kazakhstan)	Dakshika Gunatilleke / Mahen Samaranayake; Oleg Yermakov / Ikramzhan Yuldashev	21; 3	21; 9
5	(Sri Lanka) (Kazakhstan)	Yasmitha Dayarathne / Kavindika de Silva; Diana Fakhrutdinova / Madina Smagulova	21; 11	21; 12

==== China vs Chinese Taipei ====
China
5
CPB Badminton and Sports Science Training Center, Court 1
29 June 2015, 17:00 UTC+7

Chinese Taipei
0

			1	2	3
1	(China) (Chinese Taipei)	He Jiting / Du Yue; Hung Tzu-wei / Chao Pin-chi	21; 8	21; 12
2	(China) (Chinese Taipei)	Lin Guipu; Chen Chun-wei	21; 18	21; 16
3	(China) (Chinese Taipei)	He Jiting / Zheng Siwei; Hung Tzu-wei / Lin Yu-feng	21; 11	21; 11
4	(China) (Chinese Taipei)	Chen Yufei; Hsu Wen-chi	21; 15	21; 13
5	(China) (Chinese Taipei)	Chen Qingchen / Jia Yifan; Chao Pin-chi / Chiang Ya-ting	21; 8	21; 8

==== Hong Kong vs Sri Lanka ====
Hong Kong
5
CPB Badminton and Sports Science Training Center, Court 4
29 June 2015, 17:00 UTC+7

Sri Lanka
0

			1	2	3
1	(Hong Kong) (Sri Lanka)	Chan Yin Chak; Mahen Samaranayake	21; 13	21; 10
2	(Hong Kong) (Sri Lanka)	Chow King Ling; Thanushi Ratnayaka	21; 5	21; 12
3	(Hong Kong) (Sri Lanka)	Yonny Chung / Li Kuen Hon; Dakshika Gunatilleke / Mahen Samaranayake	21; 12	21; 14
4	(Hong Kong) (Sri Lanka)	Fan Ka Yan / Yeung Nga Ting; Mahesha Geethmi Abeyrathne / Hasini Ambalangodage	21; 11	21; 6
5	(Hong Kong) (Sri Lanka)	Yonny Chung / Ng Tsz Yau; Dakshika Gunatilleke / Yasmitha Dayarathne	21; 10	21; 11

=== Group B ===
Pos	Team	Pld	W	L	MF	MA	MD	GF	GA	GD	PF	PA	PD	Pts	Qualification	Japan	Thailand	Vietnam	Nepal	Mongolia
1	Japan	4	4	0	20	0	+20	40	1	+39	860	357	+503	4	Advance to knockout stage	—	5–0	5–0	5–0	5–0
2	Thailand (H)	4	3	1	15	5	+10	31	10	+21	800	475	+325	3	Advance to knockout stage		—	5–0	5–0	5–0
3	Vietnam	4	2	2	10	10	0	20	20	0	641	556	+85	2				—	5–0	5–0
4	Nepal	4	1	3	5	15	−10	10	30	−20	452	726	−274	1					—	5–0
5	Mongolia	4	0	4	0	20	−20	0	40	−40	201	840	−639	0						—

Source: BadmintonCN
(H) Host

==== Japan vs Mongolia ====
Japan
5
CPB Badminton and Sports Science Training Center, Court 1
28 June 2015, 09:00 UTC+7

Mongolia
0

			1	2	3
1	(Japan) (Mongolia)	Koki Watanabe; Gankhuyag Dashnyam	21; 1	21; 7
2	(Japan) (Mongolia)	Shiori Saito; Narantsetseg Bayarsaikhan	21; 1	21; 6
3	(Japan) (Mongolia)	Shuto Morioka / Keita Ogawa; Gankhuyag Dashnyam / Dashdulam Davaadorj	21; 3	21; 3
4	(Japan) (Mongolia)	Hikari Saito / Natsuki Sone; Dashdondov Bulgamaa / Olzvoi Janchiv	21; 0	21; 3
5	(Japan) (Mongolia)	Yuta Watanabe / Chiharu Shida; Dashdulam Davaadorj / Narantsetseg Bayarsaikhan	21; 2	21; 1

==== Thailand vs Vietnam ====
Thailand
5
CPB Badminton and Sports Science Training Center, Court 2
28 June 2015, 09:00 UTC+7

Vietnam
0

			1	2	3
1	(Thailand) (Vietnam)	Pacharapol Nipornram / Nattamon Laisuan; Lê Duy Nam / Phạm Thị Khánh	21; 15	21; 15
2	(Thailand) (Vietnam)	Kantawat Leelavechabutr; Đặng Quang Huy	21; 14	21; 8
3	(Thailand) (Vietnam)	Mek Narongrit / Krit Tantianankul; Lê Văn Tú / Nguyễn Văn Đức	21; 11	21; 10
4	(Thailand) (Vietnam)	Supanida Katethong; Nguyễn Thùy Linh	21; 13	21; 17
5	(Thailand) (Vietnam)	Nattamon Laisuan / Kilasu Ostermeyer; Nguyễn Thị Phương Hà / Phạm Thị Khánh	21; 13	21; 16

==== Nepal vs Mongolia ====
Nepal
5
CPB Badminton and Sports Science Training Center, Court 1
28 June 2015, 13:00 UTC+7

Mongolia
0

			1	2	3
1	(Nepal) (Mongolia)	Nir Devkota / Sunaina Mukhiya; Gankhuyag Dashnyam / Narantsetseg Bayarsaikhan	21; 17	21; 10
2	(Nepal) (Mongolia)	Dipesh Dhami; Dashdulam Davaadorj	21; 4	21; 1
3	(Nepal) (Mongolia)	Sichhya Shrestha; Narantsetseg Bayarsaikhan	21; 12	21; 15
4	(Nepal) (Mongolia)	Dipesh Dhami / Nir Devkota; Gankhuyag Dashnyam / Dashdulam Davaadorj	21; 6	21; 8
5	(Nepal) (Mongolia)	Sunaina Mukhiya / Sichhya Shrestha; Dashdondov Bulgamaa / Olzvoi Janchiv	21; 8	21; 14

==== Japan vs Vietnam ====
Japan
5
CPB Badminton and Sports Science Training Center, Court 2
28 June 2015, 13:00 UTC+7

Vietnam
0

			1	2	3
1	(Japan) (Vietnam)	Kenya Mitsuhashi / Yuta Watanabe; Nguyễn Đức Giang / Đặng Quang Huy	21; 5	21; 10
2	(Japan) (Vietnam)	Yoshitaka Ogura; Lê Đức Phát	21; 11	21; 13
3	(Japan) (Vietnam)	Natsuki Nidaira; Phạm Thị Khánh	21; 8	21; 3
4	(Japan) (Vietnam)	Nami Matsuyama / Chiharu Shida; Nguyễn Thị Phương Hà / Nguyễn Thùy Linh	21; 6	21; 10
5	(Japan) (Vietnam)	Kento Sakai / Hikari Saito; Lê Duy Nam / Phạm Thị Khánh	21; 11	21; 11

==== Thailand vs Mongolia ====
Thailand
5
CPB Badminton and Sports Science Training Center, Court 3
28 June 2015, 17:00 UTC+7

Mongolia
0

			1	2	3
1	(Thailand) (Mongolia)	Kantaphon Wangcharoen; Gankhuyag Dashnyam	21; 2	21; 5
2	(Thailand) (Mongolia)	Pornpawee Chochuwong; Olzvoi Janchiv	21; 3	21; 1
3	(Thailand) (Mongolia)	Pakin Kunaanuwit / Natthapat Trinkajee; Gankhuyag Dashnyam / Dashdulam Davaadorj	21; 1	21; 2
4	(Thailand) (Mongolia)	Natchpapha Chatupornkarnchana / Jhenicha Sudjaipraparat; Narantsetseg Bayarsaikhan / Dashdondov Bulgamaa	21; 6	21; 8
5	(Thailand) (Mongolia)	Krit Tantianankul / Supanida Katethong; Dashdulam Davaadorj / Olzvoi Janchiv	21; 4	21; 5

==== Japan vs Nepal ====
Japan
5
CPB Badminton and Sports Science Training Center, Court 3
29 June 2015, 09:00 UTC+7

Nepal
0

			1	2	3
1	(Japan) (Nepal)	Koki Watanabe / Nami Matsuyama; Nir Devkota / Sunaina Mukhiya	21; 7	21; 2
2	(Japan) (Nepal)	Masayuki Onodera; Dipesh Dhami	21; 8	21; 16
3	(Japan) (Nepal)	Moe Araki; Sichhya Shrestha	21; 8	21; 6
4	(Japan) (Nepal)	Shuto Morioka / Keita Ogawa; Nir Devkota / Dipesh Dhami	21; 8	21; 8
5	(Japan) (Nepal)	Hikari Saito / Natsuki Sone; Sunaina Mukhiya / Sichhya Shrestha	21; 3	21; 6

==== Thailand vs Nepal ====
Thailand
5
CPB Badminton and Sports Science Training Center, Court 2
29 June 2015, 13:00 UTC+7

Nepal
0

			1	2	3
1	(Thailand) (Nepal)	Pakin Kunaanuwit / Supamart Mingchua; Nir Devkota / Sunaina Mukhiya	21; 6	21; 2
2	(Thailand) (Nepal)	Adulrach Namkul; Dipesh Dhami	21; 11	21; 12
3	(Thailand) (Nepal)	Thamolwan Poopradubsil; Sichhya Shrestha	21; 5	21; 9
4	(Thailand) (Nepal)	Pakin Kunaanuwit / Natthapat Trinkajee; Nir Devkota / Dipesh Dhami	21; 12	21; 9
5	(Thailand) (Nepal)	Natchpapha Chatupornkarnchana / Jhenicha Sudjaipraparat; Sunaina Mukhiya / Sichhya Shrestha	21; 3	21; 7

==== Vietnam vs Mongolia ====
Vietnam
5
CPB Badminton and Sports Science Training Center, Court 3
29 June 2015, 13:00 UTC+7

Mongolia
0

			1	2	3
1	(Vietnam) (Mongolia)	Lê Văn Tú / Nguyễn Văn Đức; Gankhuyag Dashnyam / Dashdulam Davaadorj	21; 1	21; 7
2	(Vietnam) (Mongolia)	Nguyễn Thùy Linh; Dashdondov Bulgamaa	21; 3	21; 1
3	(Vietnam) (Mongolia)	Nguyễn Đức Giang; Dashdulam Davaadorj	21; 1	21; 7
4	(Vietnam) (Mongolia)	Nguyễn Thị Phương Hà / Phạm Thị Khánh; Olzvoi Janchiv / Narantsetseg Bayarsaikhan	21; 6	21; 6
5	(Vietnam) (Mongolia)	Lê Đức Phát / Nguyễn Thùy Linh; Gankhuyag Dashnyam / Dashdondov Bulgamaa	21; 6	21; 4

==== Nepal vs Vietnam ====
Nepal
0
CPB Badminton and Sports Science Training Center, Court 3
29 June 2015, 17:00 UTC+7

Vietnam
5

			1	2	3
1	(Nepal) (Vietnam)	Nir Devkota / Sunaina Mukhiya; Lê Đức Phát / Nguyễn Thị Phương Hà	12; 21	3; 21
2	(Nepal) (Vietnam)	Dipesh Dhami; Lê Duy Nam	14; 21	20; 22
3	(Nepal) (Vietnam)	Sichhya Shrestha; Nguyễn Thùy Linh	4; 21	7; 21
4	(Nepal) (Vietnam)	Sunaina Mukhiya / Sichhya Shrestha; Phạm Thị Khánh / Nguyễn Thùy Linh	7; 21	3; 21
5	(Nepal) (Vietnam)	Dipesh Dhami / Devkota Nir; Lê Duy Nam / Đặng Quang Huy	10; 21	14; 21

==== Japan vs Thailand ====
Japan
5
CPB Badminton and Sports Science Training Center, Court 5
29 June 2015, 17:00 UTC+7

Thailand
0

			1	2	3
1	(Japan) (Thailand)	Yuta Watanabe / Chiharu Shida; Pacharapol Nipornram / Nattamon Laisuan	21; 14	21; 10
2	(Japan) (Thailand)	Yoshitaka Ogura; Kantawat Leelavechabutr	21; 17	21; 15
3	(Japan) (Thailand)	Kenya Mitsuhashi / Yuta Watanabe; Mek Narongrit / Krit Tantianankul	21; 11	21; 19
4	(Japan) (Thailand)	Natsuki Nidaira; Pornpawee Chochuwong	21; 14	20; 22	21; 18
5	(Japan) (Thailand)	Nami Matsuyama / Chiharu Shida; Supanida Katethong / Kilasu Ostermeyer	21; 11	21; 19

=== Group C ===
Pos	Team	Pld	W	L	MF	MA	MD	GF	GA	GD	PF	PA	PD	Pts	Qualification	South Korea	Malaysia	Singapore	Macau
1	South Korea	3	3	0	12	3	+9	25	9	+16	679	446	+233	3	Advance to knockout stage	—	4–1	3–2	5–0
2	Malaysia	3	2	1	11	4	+7	24	9	+15	606	490	+116	2	Advance to knockout stage		—	5–0	5–0
3	Singapore	3	1	2	7	8	−1	15	16	−1	542	523	+19	1				—	5–0
4	Macau	3	0	3	0	15	−15	0	30	−30	262	630	−368	0					—

Source: BadmintonCN

==== South Korea vs Macau ====
South Korea
5
CPB Badminton and Sports Science Training Center, Court 5
28 June 2015, 09:00 UTC+7

Macau
0

			1	2	3
1	(South Korea) (Macau)	Park Kyung-hoon / Park Hye-eun; Lou Hok Man / Gong Xue Xin	21; 8	21; 12
2	(South Korea) (Macau)	Son Seong-hyun; Iek U Ieong	21; 9	21; 8
3	(South Korea) (Macau)	Lee Hong-sub / Lim Su-min; Che Pui Ngai / Pui Pang Fong	21; 5	21; 5
4	(South Korea) (Macau)	Jang Na-ra; Ng Weng Chi	21; 4	21; 2
5	(South Korea) (Macau)	Kim Ga-eun / Kim Hyang-im; Chan Kit Lei / Gong Xue Xin	21; 3	21; 14

==== Singapore vs Malaysia ====
Singapore
0
CPB Badminton and Sports Science Training Center, Court 6
28 June 2015, 09:00 UTC+7

Malaysia
5

			1	2	3
1	(Singapore) (Malaysia)	Jason Wong / Elaine Chua; Cheam June Wei / Goh Jin Wei	14; 21	12; 21
2	(Singapore) (Malaysia)	Loh Kean Yew; Satheishtharan Ramachandran	19; 21	12; 21
3	(Singapore) (Malaysia)	Lee Jian Liang / Jason Wong; Goh Sze Fei / Tan Jinn Hwa	18; 21	18; 21
4	(Singapore) (Malaysia)	Ong Ren-ne; Lee Ying Ying	12; 21	11; 21
5	(Singapore) (Malaysia)	Elaine Chua / Crystal Wong; Goh Jin Wei / Thinaah Muralitharan	12; 21	14; 21

==== South Korea vs Malaysia ====
South Korea
4
CPB Badminton and Sports Science Training Center, Court 5
28 June 2015, 17:00 UTC+7

Malaysia
1

			1	2	3
1	(South Korea) (Malaysia)	Choi Jong-woo / Kim Hye-jeong; Cheam June Wei / Goh Jin Wei	21; 11	11; 21	21; 9
2	(South Korea) (Malaysia)	Seo Seung-jae; Satheishtharan Ramachandran	17; 21	21; 13	21; 13
3	(South Korea) (Malaysia)	Kim Ga-eun; Goh Jin Wei	21; 12	21; 23	15; 21
4	(South Korea) (Malaysia)	Choi Jong-woo / Seo Seung-jae; Goh Sze Fei / Tan Jinn Hwa	21; 10	21; 18
5	(South Korea) (Malaysia)	Kim Hye-jeong / Park Hye-eun; Anna Cheong / Ooi Shi Han	21; 4	21; 10

==== Singapore vs Macau ====
Singapore
5
CPB Badminton and Sports Science Training Center, Court 6
28 June 2015, 17:00 UTC+7

Macau
0

			1	2	3
1	(Singapore) (Macau)	Loh Kean Yew / Elaine Chua; Iek U Ieong / Gong Xue Xin	21; 13	21; 7
2	(Singapore) (Macau)	Ryan Ng; Lou Hok Man	21; 9	21; 10
3	(Singapore) (Macau)	Ong Ren-ne; Chan Kit Lei	21; 7	21; 5
4	(Singapore) (Macau)	Chuang Jin Lei / Jason Wong; Iek U Ieong / Lou Hok Man	21; 12	21; 14
5	(Singapore) (Macau)	Ong Ren-ne / Crystal Wong; Gong Xue Xin / Ng Weng Chi	21; 8	21; 12

==== Malaysia vs Macau ====
Malaysia
5
CPB Badminton and Sports Science Training Center, Court 1
29 June 2015, 09:00 UTC+7

Macau
0

			1	2	3
1	(Malaysia) (Macau)	Tan Jinn Hwa / Anna Cheong; Lou Hok Man / Ng Weng Chi	21; 7	21; 8
2	(Malaysia) (Macau)	Lee Zii Jia; Iek U Ieong	21; 8	21; 6
3	(Malaysia) (Macau)	Aaron Chia / Sim Guo Zheng; Che Pui Ngai / Pui Pang Fong	21; 9	21; 16
4	(Malaysia) (Macau)	Lee Ying Ying; Chan Kit Lei	21; 8	21; 5
5	(Malaysia) (Macau)	Anna Cheong / Ooi Shi Han; Gong Xue Xin / Ng Weng Chi	21; 12	21; 16

==== South Korea vs Singapore ====
South Korea
3
CPB Badminton and Sports Science Training Center, Court 2
29 June 2015, 09:00 UTC+7

Singapore
2

			1	2	3
1	(South Korea) (Singapore)	Choi Jong-woo / Kim Hye-jeong; Loh Kean Yew / Elaine Chua	19; 21	17; 21
2	(South Korea) (Singapore)	Jang Na-ra; Ong Ren-ne	22; 20	21; 14
3	(South Korea) (Singapore)	Lee Seung-hoon; Loh Kean Yew	17; 21	17; 21
4	(South Korea) (Singapore)	Kim Hye-jeong / Park Hye-eun; Crystal Wong / Elaine Chua	19; 21	21; 11	21; 8
5	(South Korea) (Singapore)	Park Kyung-hoon / Seo Seung-jae; Ryan Ng / Jason Wong	21; 16	21; 16

=== Group D ===
Pos	Team	Pld	W	L	MF	MA	MD	GF	GA	GD	PF	PA	PD	Pts	Qualification	Indonesia	India	Philippines	Turkmenistan
1	Indonesia	3	3	0	13	2	+11	28	7	+21	705	391	+314	3	Advance to knockout stage	—	4–1	4–1	5–0
2	India	3	2	1	9	6	+3	20	13	+7	614	448	+166	2	Advance to knockout stage		—	3–2	5–0
3	Philippines	3	1	2	8	7	+1	17	15	+2	542	500	+42	1				—	5–0
4	Turkmenistan	3	0	3	0	15	−15	0	30	−30	108	630	−522	0					—

Source: BadmintonCN

==== India vs Philippines ====
India
3
CPB Badminton and Sports Science Training Center, Court 5
28 June 2015, 13:00 UTC+7

Philippines
2

			1	2	3
1	(India) (Philippines)	M. R. Arjun / Kuhoo Garg; Alvin Morada / Alyssa Leonardo	15; 21	20; 22
2	(India) (Philippines)	Siril Verma; Frell Keeyan Gabuelo	21; 11	21; 12
3	(India) (Philippines)	M. R. Arjun / Chirag Shetty; Christian Bernardo / Alvin Morada	21; 10	23; 21
4	(India) (Philippines)	Shreyanshi Pardeshi; Airah Mae Nicole Albo	21; 9	21; 16
5	(India) (Philippines)	J. K. Malavika / Karishma Wadkar; Alyssa Leonardo / Eleanor Inlayo	19; 21	17; 21

==== Indonesia vs Turkmenistan ====
Indonesia
5
CPB Badminton and Sports Science Training Center, Court 6
28 June 2015, 13:00 UTC+7

Turkmenistan
0

			1	2	3
1	(Indonesia) (Turkmenistan)	Drajat Beno / Yulfira Barkah; Kemal Atliyev / Alina Klychkova	21; 2	21; 2
2	(Indonesia) (Turkmenistan)	Firman Abdul Kholik; Nurmuhammet Apov	21; 3	21; 3
3	(Indonesia) (Turkmenistan)	Gregoria Mariska Tunjung; Yana Sarkisyan	21; 1	21; 1
4	(Indonesia) (Turkmenistan)	Fachryza Abimanyu / Muhammad Reza Pahlevi Isfahani; Nurmuhammet Apov / Kemal Atliyev	21; 2	21; 1
5	(Indonesia) (Turkmenistan)	Apriyani Rahayu / Jauza Fadhila Sugiarto; Alina Klychkova / Yana Sarkisyan	21; 2	21; 1

==== Indonesia vs Philippines ====
Indonesia
4
CPB Badminton and Sports Science Training Center, Court 1
28 June 2015, 17:00 UTC+7

Philippines
1

			1	2	3
1	(Indonesia) (Philippines)	Muhammad Reza Pahlevi Isfahani / Andika Ramadiansyah; Christian Bernardo / Alvin Morada	21; 17	19; 21	21; 12
2	(Indonesia) (Philippines)	Ruselli Hartawan; Sarah Barredo	21; 7	21; 9
3	(Indonesia) (Philippines)	Enzi Shafira; Emilio Jr. Mangubat	21; 5	21; 12
4	(Indonesia) (Philippines)	Nisak Puji Lestari / Rika Rositawati; Alyssa Leonardo / Thea Pomar	21; 15	18; 21	15; 21
5	(Indonesia) (Philippines)	Andika Ramadiansyah / Apriyani Rahayu; Christian Bernardo / Eleanor Inlayo	21; 15	21; 13

==== India vs Turkmenistan ====
India
5
CPB Badminton and Sports Science Training Center, Court 2
28 June 2015, 17:00 UTC+7

Turkmenistan
0

			1	2	3
1	(India) (Turkmenistan)	M. R. Arjun / Kuhoo Garg; Nurmuhammet Apov / Yana Sarkisyan	21; 8	21; 6
2	(India) (Turkmenistan)	Chirag Sen; Kemal Atliyev	21; 0	21; 0
3	(India) (Turkmenistan)	Vrushali Gummadi; Alina Klychkova	21; 2	21; 1
4	(India) (Turkmenistan)	M. R. Arjun / Chirag Shetty; Kemal Atliyev / Nurmuhammet Apov	21; 1	21; 3
5	(India) (Turkmenistan)	J. K. Malavika / Karishma Wadkar; Alina Klychkova / Yana Sarkisyan	21; 4	21; 5

==== Philippines vs Turkmenistan ====
Philippines
5
CPB Badminton and Sports Science Training Center, Court 5
29 June 2015, 09:00 UTC+7

Turkmenistan
0

			1	2	3
1	(Philippines) (Turkmenistan)	Joaquin Deato / Jessie Francisco; Kemal Atliyev / Alina Klychkova	21; 7	21; 7
2	(Philippines) (Turkmenistan)	Alexis Giverjuan; Nurmuhammet Apov	21; 9	21; 7
3	(Philippines) (Turkmenistan)	Mariya Sevilla; Yana Sarkisyan	21; 2	21; 5
4	(Philippines) (Turkmenistan)	Joaquin Deato / Vincent Manuel; Nurmuhammet Apov / Kemal Atliyev	21; 7	21; 10
5	(Philippines) (Turkmenistan)	Joella Geva de Vera / Jessie Francisco; Alina Klychkova / Yana Sarkisyan	21; 5	21; 1

==== Indonesia vs India ====
Indonesia
4
CPB Badminton and Sports Science Training Center, Court 6
29 June 2015, 09:00 UTC+7

India
1

			1	2	3
1	(Indonesia) (India)	Yahya Adi Kumara / Andika Ramadiansyah; M. R. Arjun / Chirag Shetty	21; 14	19; 21	21; 17
2	(Indonesia) (India)	Gregoria Mariska Tunjung; Shreyanshi Pardeshi	15; 21	21; 11	16; 21
3	(Indonesia) (India)	Firman Abdul Kholik; Chirag Sen	15; 21	21; 14	21; 8
4	(Indonesia) (India)	Nisak Puji Lestari / Apriyani Rahayu; J. K. Malavika / Karishma Wadkar	21; 13	21; 19
5	(Indonesia) (India)	Drajat Beno / Yulfira Barkah; M. R. Arjun / Kuhoo Garg	21; 11	21; 14

== Knockout stage ==
=== Bracket ===
Quarter-finals
30 June
China	3
Malaysia	0
30 June
Japan	3
India	1
30 June
Hong Kong	1
South Korea	3
30 June
Thailand	2
Indonesia	3

Semi-finals
30 June
China	3
Japan	0
30 June
South Korea	3
Indonesia	2

Final
1 July
China	3
South Korea	0

=== Quarter-finals ===
==== China vs Malaysia ====
China
3
CPB Badminton and Sports Science Training Center, Court 6
30 June 2015, 09:00 UTC+7

Malaysia
0

			1	2	3
1	(China) (Malaysia)	Zheng Siwei / Chen Qingchen; Tan Jinn Hwa / Goh Jin Wei	21; 8	21; 8
2	(China) (Malaysia)	Lin Guipu; Cheam June Wei	21; 5	21; 17
3	(China) (Malaysia)	He Jiting / Zheng Siwei; Aaron Chia / Goh Sze Fei	21; 17	18; 21	21; 12
4	(China) (Malaysia)	Chen Yufei; Goh Jin Wei				not played
5	(China) (Malaysia)	Chen Qingchen / Jia Yifan; Eng Pui Yee / Ooi Shi Han				not played

==== Japan vs India ====
Japan
4
CPB Badminton and Sports Science Training Center, Court 1
30 June 2015, 09:00 UTC+7

India
1

			1	2	3
1	(Japan) (India)	Yuta Watanabe / Chiharu Shida; Chirag Shetty / Kuhoo Garg	21; 14	21; 15
2	(Japan) (India)	Yoshitaka Ogura; Chirag Sen	19; 21	21; 18	13; 21
3	(Japan) (India)	Kenya Mitsuhashi / Yuta Watanabe; Rohan Kapoor / Saurabh Sharma	21; 11	21; 11
4	(Japan) (India)	Moe Araki; Vrushali Gummadi	21; 19	21; 8
5	(Japan) (India)	Nami Matsuyama / Chiharu Shida; J. K. Malavika / Karishma Wadkar				not played

==== Hong Kong vs South Korea ====
Hong Kong
1
CPB Badminton and Sports Science Training Center, Court 4
30 June 2015, 09:00 UTC+7

South Korea
3

			1	2	3
1	(Hong Kong) (South Korea)	Yonny Chung / Ng Tsz Yau; Park Kyung-hoon / Park Hye-eun	21; 8	21; 11
2	(Hong Kong) (South Korea)	Chan Yin Chak; Seo Seung-jae	16; 21	14; 21
3	(Hong Kong) (South Korea)	Yeung Sum Yee; Kim Ga-eun	6; 21	21; 18	11; 21
4	(Hong Kong) (South Korea)	Yonny Chung / Li Kuen Hon; Lee Hong-sub / Lim Su-min	16; 21	16; 21
5	(Hong Kong) (South Korea)	Ng Tsz Yau / Yeung Nga Ting; Kim Hyang-im / Kim Hye-jeong				not played

==== Thailand vs Indonesia ====
Thailand
2
CPB Badminton and Sports Science Training Center, Court 5
30 June 2015, 09:00 UTC+7

Indonesia
3

			1	2	3
1	(Thailand) (Indonesia)	Mek Narongrit / Krit Tantianankul; Yahya Adi Kumara / Andika Ramadiansyah	21; 19	25; 23
2	(Thailand) (Indonesia)	Supanida Katethong; Ruselli Hartawan	21; 15	21; 19
3	(Thailand) (Indonesia)	Kantaphon Wangcharoen; Enzi Shafira	21; 16	19; 21	20; 22
4	(Thailand) (Indonesia)	Kilasu Ostermeyer / Supanida Katethong; Apriyani Rahayu / Nisak Puji Lestari	19; 21	21; 19	8; 21
5	(Thailand) (Indonesia)	Phatharathorn Nipornram / Supamart Mingchua; Drajat Beno / Yulfira Barkah	18; 21	15; 21

=== Semi-finals ===
==== China vs Japan ====
China
3
CPB Badminton and Sports Science Training Center, Court 5
30 June 2015, 16:00 UTC+7

Japan
0

			1	2	3
1	(China) (Japan)	Zheng Siwei / Chen Qingchen; Yuta Watanabe / Chiharu Shida	21; 8	21; 13
2	(China) (Japan)	Lin Guipu; Koki Watanabe	19; 21	21; 17	21; 15
3	(China) (Japan)	He Jiting / Zheng Siwei; Kenya Mitsuhashi / Yuta Watanabe	25; 23	21; 17
4	(China) (Japan)	He Bing Jiao; Natsuki Nidaira				not played
5	(China) (Japan)	Chen Qingchen / Jia Yifan; Nami Matsuyama / Chiharu Shida				not played

==== South Korea vs Indonesia ====
South Korea
3
CPB Badminton and Sports Science Training Center, Court 4
30 June 2015, 16:00 UTC+7

Indonesia
2

			1	2	3
1	(South Korea) (Indonesia)	Choi Jong-woo / Kim Hye-jeong; Drajat Beno / Yulfira Barkah	21; 16	21; 15
2	(South Korea) (Indonesia)	Seo Seung-jae; Firman Abdul Kholik	18; 21	22; 24
3	(South Korea) (Indonesia)	Kim Ga-eun; Gregoria Mariska Tunjung	21; 17	15; 21	14; 21
4	(South Korea) (Indonesia)	Choi Jong-woo / Seo Seung-jae; Yahya Adi Kumara / Andika Ramadiansyah	21; 14	21; 12
5	(South Korea) (Indonesia)	Kim Hye-jeong / Park Hye-eun; Nisak Puji Lestari / Apriyani Rahayu	21; 17	21; 17

=== Final ===
==== China vs South Korea ====
China
3
CPB Badminton and Sports Science Training Center, Court 1
1 July 2015, 09:00 UTC+7

South Korea
0

			1	2	3
1	(China) (South Korea)	Zheng Siwei / Chen Qingchen; Lim Su-min / Kim Hyang-im	21; 14	21; 10
2	(China) (South Korea)	Lin Guipu; Lee Seung-hoon	21; 14	21; 9
3	(China) (South Korea)	He Jiting / Zheng Siwei; Choi Jong-woo / Seo Seung-jae	13; 21	21; 19	21; 10
4	(China) (South Korea)	He Bingjiao; Sim Yu-jin				not played
5	(China) (South Korea)	Chen Qingchen / Jia Yifan; Kim Hye-jeong / Park Hye-eun				not played
