= 2019 U.S. Open =

2019 U.S. Open may refer to:

- 2019 U.S. Open (golf), a major golf tournament
- 2019 US Open (tennis), a grand slam tennis event
- 2019 U.S. Open (badminton)
- 2019 U.S. Open Cup, a soccer tournament
