= 2015 Badminton Asia Junior Championships – Girls' doubles =

Tournament details
- Dates: 1 – 5 July 2015
- Edition: 18
- Venue: CPB Badminton and Sports Science Training Center
- Location: Bangkok, Thailand

The girls' doubles tournament of the 2015 Badminton Asia Junior Championships was held from July 1 to 5. The defending champions of the last edition were the Chinese pair Chen Qingchen and Jia Yifan. Indonesian pairs Apriani Rahayu / Jauza Fadhila Sugiarto and Marsheilla Gischa Islami / Rahmadhani Hastiyanti Putri leads the seeding this year. Du Yue and Li Yinhui who were the finalists in the last edition emerge as the champion after beat the defending champion Chen and Jia in the finals with the score 21–14, 18–21, 21–18.

== Seeded ==
1. (Indonesia) Apriani Rahayu / Jauza Fadhila Sugiarto (third round)
2. (Indonesia) Marsheilla Gischa Islami / Rahmadhani Hastiyanti Putri (third round)
3. (China) Chen Qingchen / Jia Yifan (final)
4. (Indonesia) Nisak Puji Lestari / Rika Rositawati (quarter final)
5. (South Korea) Kim Hye-jeong / Park Keun-hye (semi final)
6. (Thailand) Ruethaichanok Laisuan / Kilasu Ostermeyer (quarter final)
7. (Singapore) Elaine Chua Yi Ling / Crystal Wong Jia Ying (third round)
8. (India) Kuhoo Garg / Sonika Sai (second round)

== Draw ==
=== Finals ===
Quarterfinals
(Japan) Nami Matsuyama (Japan) Chiharu Shida | 21 | 21
(Chinese Taipei) Tai Wei-ling (Chinese Taipei) Yeh Jung-tzu | 17 | 14
3 | (China) Chen Qingchen (China) Jia Yifan | 21 | 21
6 | (Thailand) Ruethaichanok Laisuan (Thailand) Kilasu Ostermeyer | 13 | 14
5 | (South Korea) Kim Hye-jeong (South Korea) Park Keun-hye | 21 | 21
4 | (Indonesia) Nisak Puji Lestari (Indonesia) Rika Rositawati | 19 | 13
(Japan) Nao Ono (Japan) Yukiko Takahata | 11 | 11
(China) Du Yue (China) Li Yinhui | 21 | 21

Semifinals
(Japan) Nami Matsuyama (Japan) Chiharu Shida | 11 | 16
3 | (China) Chen Qingchen (China) Jia Yifan | 21 | 21
5 | (South Korea) Kim Hye-jeong (South Korea) Park Keun-hye | 21 | 10 | 19
(China) Du Yue (China) Li Yinhui | 18 | 21 | 21

Final
3 | (China) Chen Qingchen (China) Jia Yifan | 14 | 21 | 18
(China) Du Yue (China) Li Yinhui | 21 | 18 | 21

=== Top half ===
==== Section 1 ====
First round
(Philippines) J G De Vera (Philippines) J Francisco | 17 | 21 | 12
(Malaysia) A Cheong (Malaysia) D Siow | 21 | 12 | 21

Second round
1 | (Indonesia) A Rahayu (Indonesia) J F Sugiarto | 21 | 21
(Vietnam) Nguyen T P H (Vietnam) Nguyen T L | 15 | 12
(Japan) N Matsuyama (Japan) C Shida | 21 | 21
(Malaysia) A Cheong (Malaysia) D Siow | 9 | 18

Third round
1 | (Indonesia) A Rahayu (Indonesia) J F Sugiarto | 19 | 20
(Japan) N Matsuyama (Japan) C Shida | 21 | 22

==== Section 2 ====
First round
(Sri Lanka) H N Ambalangodage (Sri Lanka) G A Mahesha | 10 | 6
(Thailand) N Chatupornkarnchana (Thailand) K Sudjaipraparat | 21 | 21

Second round
8 | (India) K Garg (India) S Sai | 12 | 13
(Chinese Taipei) Tai W-l (Chinese Taipei) Yeh J-t | 21 | 21
(Hong Kong) Ng T Y (Hong Kong) Yeung N T | 21 | 21
(Thailand) N Chatupornkarnchana (Thailand) K Sudjaipraparat | 18 | 11

Third round
(Chinese Taipei) Tai W-l (Chinese Taipei) Yeh J-t | 21 | 15 | 21
(Hong Kong) Ng T Y (Hong Kong) Yeung N T | 16 | 21 | 19

==== Section 3 ====
First round
(Chinese Taipei) Chen W-t (Chinese Taipei) Jhou S-j | 21 | 14 | 19
(Thailand) S Chueboca (Thailand) C Korepap | 15 | 21 | 21

Second round
3 | (China) Chen QC (China) Jia YF | 21 | 21
(South Korea) Jang N-r (South Korea) Shim Y-r | 13 | 11
(Philippines) A M N Albo (Philippines) T M Pomar | 21 | 21 | 22
(Thailand) S Chueboca (Thailand) C Korepap | 19 | 23 | 20

Third round
3 | (China) Chen QC (China) Jia YF | 21 | 21
(Philippines) A M N Albo (Philippines) T M Pomar | 9 | 9

==== Section 4 ====
First round
(Macau) Gong X X (Macau) Ng W C | 13 | 21 | 21
(Sri Lanka) K Waduthantri (Sri Lanka) K Dayarathne | 21 | 11 | 14
(Nepal) S Mukhiya (Nepal) S Shrestha | 3 | 11
(Hong Kong) Chow K L (Hong Kong) Fan K Y | 21 | 21

Second round
6 | (Thailand) R Laisuan (Thailand) K Ostermeyer | 21 | 21
(Macau) Gong X X (Macau) Ng W C | 13 | 13
(Malaysia) Eng P Y (Malaysia) Ooi S H | 21 | 9 | 21
(Hong Kong) Chow K L (Hong Kong) Fan K Y | 14 | 21 | 13

Third round
6 | (Thailand) R Laisuan (Thailand) K Ostermeyer | 21 | 21
(Malaysia) Eng P Y (Malaysia) Ooi S H | 18 | 19

=== Bottom half ===
==== Section 5 ====
First round
(Sri Lanka) B A Galamage (Sri Lanka) H C Wijayarathne | 21 | 21
(Turkmenistan) A Klychkova (Turkmenistan) Y Sarkisyan | 8 | 6
(China) An Y (China) Zheng YW | 21 | 21
(Chinese Taipei) Chao P-c (Chinese Taipei) Chiang Y-t | 17 | 14

Second round
(Sri Lanka) B A Galamage (Sri Lanka) H C Wijayarathne | 8 | 4
(Japan) H Saito (Japan) N Sone | 21 | 21
(China) An Y (China) Zheng YW | 8 | 21 | 15
5 | (South Korea) Kim H-j (South Korea) Park K-h | 21 | 16 | 21

Third round
(Japan) H Saito (Japan) N Sone | 19 | 8
5 | (South Korea) Kim H-j (South Korea) Park K-h | 21 | 21

==== Section 6 ====
First round
(Mongolia) D Bulgamaa (Mongolia) O Janchiv | 8 | 2
(India) M Jayakumar (India) K Wadkar | 21 | 21

Second round
(India) M Jayakumar (India) K Wadkar | 18 | 21
(Thailand) T Jaiareree (Thailand) T Kaweenuntavong | 21 | 23
(Malaysia) Teoh M X (Malaysia) Tew J J | 16 | 21 | 15
4 | (Indonesia) N P Lestari (Indonesia) R Rositawati | 21 | 14 | 21

Third round
(Thailand) T Jaiareree (Thailand) T Kaweenuntavong | 11 | 16
4 | (Indonesia) N P Lestari (Indonesia) R Rositawati | 21 | 21

==== Section 7 ====
First round
(India) A Parikh (India) S Santosh | 8 | 12
(Japan) N Ono (Japan) Y Takahata | 21 | 21

Second round
(Japan) N Ono (Japan) Y Takahata | 21 | 21
(Thailand) R Iamratanamaetheekul (Thailand) S Mingchua | 9 | 17
(Hong Kong) Yau M Y (Hong Kong) Yeung S Y | 15 | 17
7 | (Singapore) E Chua (Singapore) C Wong | 21 | 21

Third round
(Japan) N Ono (Japan) Y Takahata | 21 | 21
7 | (Singapore) E Chua (Singapore) C Wong | 10 | 13

==== Section 8 ====
First round
(South Korea) Kim G-e (South Korea) Kim H-i | 21 | 21
(Kazakhstan) D Fakhrutdinova (Kazakhstan) M Smagulova | 2 | 5

Second round
(South Korea) Kim G-e (South Korea) Kim H-i | 7 | 5
(China) Du Y (China) Li YH | 21 | 21
(Philippines) E C Inlayo (Philippines) A Y Leonardo | 16 | 13
2 | (Indonesia) M G Islami (Indonesia) R H Putri | 21 | 21

Third round
(China) Du Y (China) Li YH | 21 | 21
2 | (Indonesia) M G Islami (Indonesia) R H Putri | 13 | 10
