= 2015 BWF World Junior Championships – Girls doubles =

2015 BWF World Junior Championships – Girls' Doubles
Tournament details
- Dates: 10 November 2015 – 15 November 2015
- Edition: 17th
- Level: International
- Venue: Centro de Alto Rendimiento “La Videna”
- Location: Lima

The Girls' Doubles tournament of the 2015 BWF World Junior Championships is held on November 10–15. The defending champion of the last edition is Chen Qingchen / Jia Yifan from China.

== Seeded ==
1. (China) Chen Qingchen / Jia Yifan (champion)
2. (Turkey) Kader Inal / Fatma Nur Yavuz (fourth round)
3. (Denmark) Julie Dawall Jakobsen / Ditte Soby Hansen (fourth round)
4. (Thailand) Ruethaichanok Laisuan / Kilasu Ostermeyer (fourth round)
5. (Indonesia) Marsheilla Gischa Islami / Rahmadhani Hastiyanti Putri (quarter-final)
6. (Estonia) Kristin Kuuba / Helina Ruutel (fourth round)
7. (Indonesia) Mychelle Chrystine Bandaso / Serena Kani (third round)
8. (Indonesia) Apriani Rahayu / Jauza Fadhila Sugiarto (fourth round)
9. (Turkey) Bengisu Ercetin / Nazlican Inci (third round)
10. (China) Du Yue / Li Yinhui
11. (Thailand) Rawimon Iamratanamaetheekul / Supamart Mingchua (fourth round)
12. (Japan) Nami Matsuyama / Chiharu Shida (semi-final)
13. (France) Delphine Delrue / Yaëlle Hoyaux (third round)
14. (Singapore) Elaine Chua Yi Ling / Crystal Wong Jia Ying (second round)
15. (France) Vimala Heriau / Margot Lambert (second round)
16. (Chinese Taipei) Chen Wan-ting / Lee Chia-hsin (semi-final)

== Draw ==
=== Finals ===
Quarterfinals
1	(China) Chen Qingchen (China) Jia Yifan	21	21
(Hong Kong) Ng Tsz Yau (Hong Kong) Yeung Nga Ting	14	17
16	(Chinese Taipei) Chen Wan-ting (Chinese Taipei) Lee Chia-hsin	21	17	21
5	(Indonesia) Marsheilla Gischa Islami (Indonesia) Rahmadhani Hastiyanti Putri	16	21	16
(China) Chen Lu (China) Zhou Chaomin	13	9
12	(Japan) Nami Matsuyama (Japan) Chiharu Shida	21	21
10	(China) Du Yue (China) Li Yinhui	21	21
(South Korea) Seong Ah-yeong (South Korea) Seong Na-yeong	12	7

Semifinals
1	(China) Chen Qingchen (China) Jia Yifan	21	21
16	(Chinese Taipei) Chen Wan-ting (Chinese Taipei) Lee Chia-hsin	9	13
12	(Japan) Nami Matsuyama (Japan) Chiharu Shida	17	21	12
10	(China) Du Yue (China) Li Yinhui	21	14	21

Final
1	(China) Chen Qingchen (China) Jia Yifan	21	13	21
10	(China) Du Yue (China) Li Yinhui	18	21	11

=== Top half ===
==== Section 1 ====
First round

Second round
1	(China) Chen QC (China) Jia YF	21	21
(Costa Rica) A L Martinez (Costa Rica) L Villalobos	4	5
(Iceland) A K Johannsdottir (Iceland) A K Jonsdottir	14	10
(Slovenia) N Arih (Slovenia) P Polanc	21	21
15	(France) V Heriau (France) M Lambert	20	20
(Malaysia) A Cheong (Malaysia) Teoh M X	22	22
(United States) V Chen (United States) A Lam	13	7
(Japan) N Ono (Japan) Y Takahata	21	21

Third round
1	(China) Chen QC (China) Jia YF	21	21
(Slovenia) N Arih (Slovenia) P Polanc	7	9
(Malaysia) A Cheong (Malaysia) Teoh M X	15	24
(Japan) N Ono (Japan) Y Takahata	21	26

Fourth round
1	(China) Chen QC (China) Jia YF	21	21
(Japan) N Ono (Japan) Y Takahata	11	12

==== Section 2 ====
First round

Second round
8	(Indonesia) A Rahayu (Indonesia) J F Sugiarto	21	21
(Italy) S Garino (Italy) M Punter	14	5
(New Zealand) E Calder-Hawkins (New Zealand) D Yin	21	21
(Guyana) P Ramdhani (Mexico) M Soto	4	16
14	(Singapore) E Chua (Singapore) C Wong	12	18
(Hong Kong) Ng T Y (Hong Kong) Yeung N T	21	21
(South Africa) L Schoeman (South Africa) J Scholtz	18	18
(Peru) P La Torre (Peru) D Macias	21	21

Third round
8	(Indonesia) A Rahayu (Indonesia) J F Sugiarto	21	21
(New Zealand) E Calder-Hawkins (New Zealand) D Yin	9	12
(Hong Kong) Ng T Y (Hong Kong) Yeung N T	21	21
(Peru) P La Torre (Peru) D Macias	8	11

Fourth round
8	(Indonesia) A Rahayu (Indonesia) J F Sugiarto	16	19
(Hong Kong) Ng T Y (Hong Kong) Yeung N T	21	21

==== Section 3 ====
First round

Second round
4	(Thailand) R Laisuan (Thailand) K Ostermeyer	21	21
(Netherlands) D Jille (Netherlands) I van der Aar	14	14
(India) M Jayakumar (India) K Wadkar	6	8
(South Korea) Baek H-n (South Korea) Shim Y-r	21	21
16	(Chinese Taipei) Chen W-t (Chinese Taipei) Lee C-h	21	21
(Hungary) R Madarasz (Hungary) V Sandorhazi	8	3
(Germany) Y Li (Germany) J Petrikowski	18	23
(England) Ngan M L (England) J Pugh	21	25

Third round
4	(Thailand) R Laisuan (Thailand) K Ostermeyer	21	21
(South Korea) Baek H-n (South Korea) Shim Y-r	17	19
16	(Chinese Taipei) Chen W-t (Chinese Taipei) Lee C-h	21	21
(England) Ngan M L (England) J Pugh	16	7

Fourth round
4	(Thailand) R Laisuan (Thailand) K Ostermeyer	24	17	12
16	(Chinese Taipei) Chen W-t (Chinese Taipei) Lee C-h	22	21	21

==== Section 4 ====
First round

Second round
5	(Indonesia) M G Islami (Indonesia) R H Putri	21	21
(Chile) L Pontigo (Chile) P Pontigo	0	5
(Mexico) A P de la Torre (Mexico) A I Valero	21	21
(Macau) Gong X X (Macau) Zou Z L	11	13
9	(Turkey) B Ercetin (Turkey) N Inci	15	22	25
(Denmark) A Magelund (Denmark) M Skodstrup	21	20	23
(Sweden) E Karlsson (Sweden) J Magnusson	21	21
(El Salvador) F Centeno (El Salvador) M Hernandez	3	15

Third round
5	(Indonesia) M G Islami (Indonesia) R H Putri	21	21
(Mexico) A P de la Torre (Mexico) A I Valero	7	12
9	(Turkey) B Ercetin (Turkey) N Inci	19	10
(Sweden) E Karlsson (Sweden) J Magnusson	21	21

Fourth round
5	(Indonesia) M G Islami (Indonesia) R H Putri	18	21	21
(Sweden) E Karlsson (Sweden) J Magnusson	21	18	7

=== Bottom half ===
==== Section 5 ====
First round
(India) A Parikh (India) S Santosh	21	21
(Australia) J Lai (Australia) A Wu	16	19

Second round
(India) A Parikh (India) S Santosh	21	21
(Peru) I Castillo (Peru) V C Wong	5	11
(Cuba) A Artiz (Cuba) M Azcuy	13	11
11	(Thailand) R Iamratanamaetheekul (Thailand) S Mingchua	21	21
(Malaysia) T Muralitharan (Malaysia) Ng Q X	10	12
(China) Chen L (China) Zhou CM	21	21
(South Korea) Lee Y-r (South Korea) Park G-e	18	21	17
7	(Indonesia) M C Bandaso (Indonesia) S Kani	21	15	21

Third round
(India) A Parikh (India) S Santosh	8	13
11	(Thailand) R Iamratanamaetheekul (Thailand) S Mingchua	21	21
(China) Chen L (China) Zhou CM	21	21
7	(Indonesia) M C Bandaso (Indonesia) S Kani	16	16

Fourth round
11	(Thailand) R Iamratanamaetheekul (Thailand) S Mingchua	17	14
(China) Chen L (China) Zhou CM	21	21

==== Section 6 ====
First round

Second round
(United States) J Lee (United States) B Wang	17	20
(Slovenia) E Cizelj (Slovenia) N Stovanje	21	22
(Chinese Taipei) Hsu W-c (Chinese Taipei) Sung S-y	14	10
12	(Japan) N Matsuyama (Japan) C Shida	21	21
(Germany) R Plutzer (Germany) A Schreiber	19	17
(Thailand) P Tosupaluk (Thailand) R Urasaeng	21	21
(Sweden) M Sjoo (Sweden) E Svensson	17	12
7	(Denmark) J Dawall (Denmark) D Soby	21	21

Third round
(Slovenia) E Cizelj (Slovenia) N Stovanje	9	11
12	(Japan) N Matsuyama (Japan) C Shida	21	21
(Thailand) P Tosupaluk (Thailand) R Urasaeng	13	12
3	(Denmark) J Dawall (Denmark) D Soby	21	21

Fourth round
12	(Japan) N Matsuyama (Japan) C Shida	21	21
3	(Denmark) J Dawall (Denmark) D Soby	9	9

==== Section 7 ====
First round

Second round
(England) Liew F T (England) L Tolman	12	22
(Hong Kong) Fan K Y (Hong Kong) Yeung S Y	21	24
(Spain) M J Azcue (Spain) E Murio	3	10
10	(China) Du Y (China) Li YH	21	21
(Japan) M Kawashima (Japan) N Sone	21	21
(New Zealand) S Fu (New Zealand) C Zhang	13	7
(Guatemala) A J Paiz (Guatemala) M I Paiz	5	5
6	(Estonia) K Kuuba (Estonia) H Ruutel	21	21

Third round
(Hong Kong) Fan K Y (Hong Kong) Yeung S Y	4	14
10	(China) Du Y (China) Li YH	21	21
(Japan) M Kawashima (Japan) N Sone	14	17
6	(Estonia) K Kuuba (Estonia) H Ruutel	21	21

Fourth round
10	(China) Du Y (China) Li YH	21	21
6	(Estonia) K Kuuba (Estonia) H Ruutel	5	11

==== Section 8 ====
First round

Second round
(Dominican Republic) N A Jimenez (Dominican Republic) B A Polanco	6	1
(South Korea) Seong A-y (South Korea) Seong N-y	21	21
(Venezuela) D M Ortiz (Venezuela) T Sanchez	10	8
13	(France) D Delrue (France) Y Hoyaux	21	21
(Colombia) T Muñoz (Colombia) B Gil	18	15
(Argentina) F Bernatene (Barbados) A Haywood	21	21
(Canada) K Cheng (Canada) Q Ouyang	18	11
2	(Turkey) K Inal (Turkey) F N Yavuz	21	21

Third round
(South Korea) Seong A-y (South Korea) Seong N-y	25	21
13	(France) D Delrue (France) Y Hoyaux	23	13
(Argentina) F Bernatene (Barbados) A Haywood	8	7
2	(Turkey) K Inal (Turkey) F N Yavuz	21	21

Fourth round
(South Korea) Seong A-y (South Korea) Seong N-y	24	21
2	(Turkey) K Inal (Turkey) F N Yavuz	22	19
