= Chiharu Shida =

Japanese badminton player

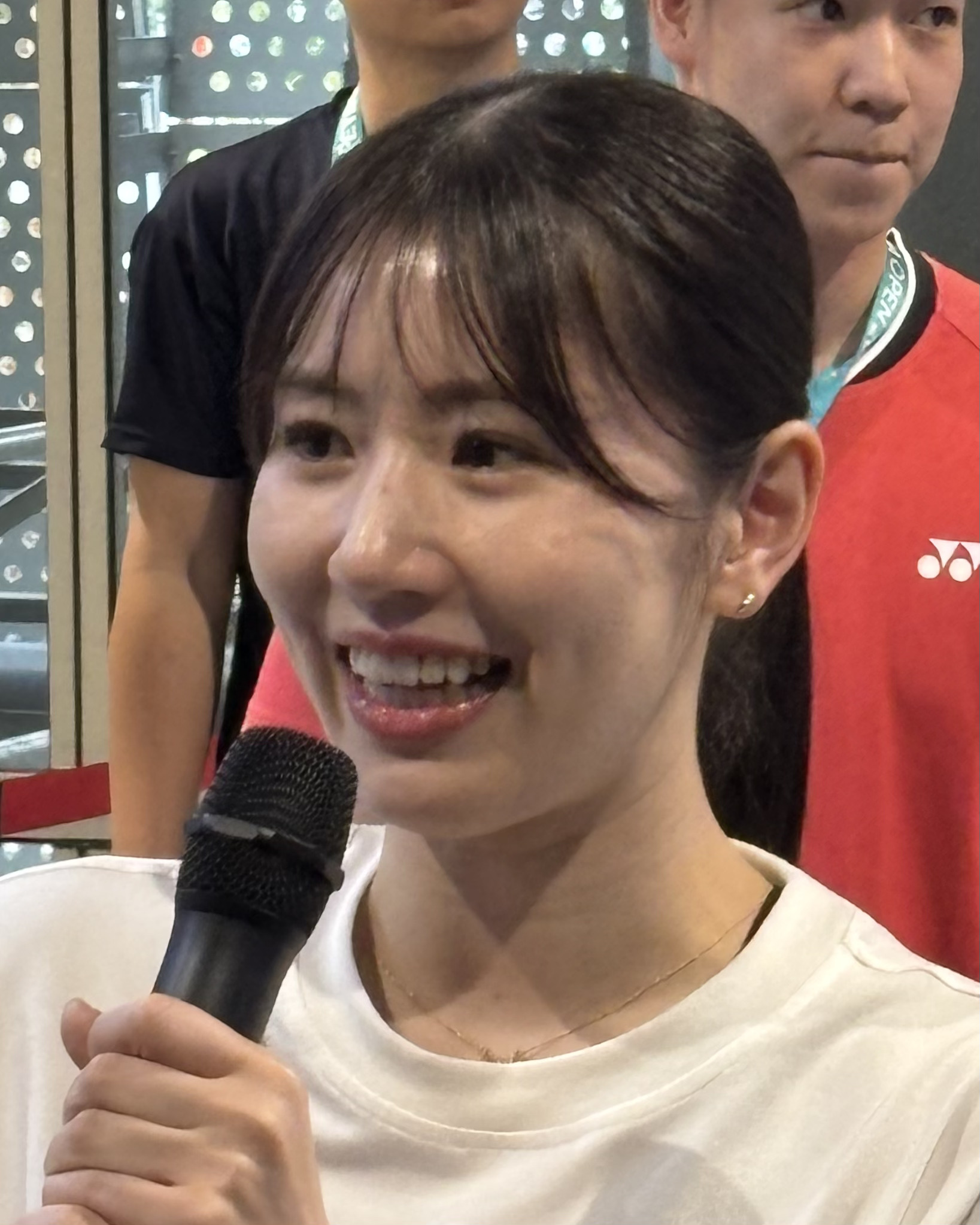
- Shida during the 2026 Malaysia Open

Personal information
- Born: 29 April 1997 (age 29) Hachirōgata, Akita, Japan
- Height: 1.62 m (5 ft 4 in)

Sport
- Country: Japan
- Sport: Badminton
- Handedness: Right
- Coached by: Kei Nakashima

Women's & mixed doubles
- Highest ranking: 2 (WD with Nami Matsuyama, 8 November 2022); 211 (XD with Yunosuke Kubota, 5 July 2018)
- Current ranking: 95 (WD with Ririna Hiramoto, 17 November 2026)
- BWF profile
Medal record
Women's badminton
Representing Japan
Olympic Games
Bronze medal – third place	2024 Paris	Women's doubles
World Championships
Bronze medal – third place	2025 Paris	Women's doubles
Sudirman Cup
Silver medal – second place	2021 Vantaa	Mixed team
Bronze medal – third place	2023 Suzhou	Mixed team
Bronze medal – third place	2025 Xiamen	Mixed team
Uber Cup
Silver medal – second place	2020 Aarhus	Women's team
Bronze medal – third place	2022 Bangkok	Women's team
Bronze medal – third place	2024 Chengdu	Women's team
Bronze medal – third place	2026 Horsens	Women's team
Asian Championships
Silver medal – second place	2025 Ningbo	Women's doubles
Asian Games
Bronze medal – third place	2022 Hangzhou	Women's team
Asia Team Championships
Gold medal – first place	2020 Manila	Women's team
Bronze medal – third place	2024 Selangor	Women's team
World Junior Championships
Bronze medal – third place	2014 Alor Setar	Mixed team
Bronze medal – third place	2015 Lima	Girls' doubles
Bronze medal – third place	2015 Lima	Mixed doubles
Asian Junior Championships
Bronze medal – third place	2014 Taipei	Mixed team
Bronze medal – third place	2015 Bangkok	Girls' doubles
Bronze medal – third place	2015 Bangkok	Mixed team

Chiharu Shida (志田 千陽, Shida Chiharu; born 29 April 1997) is a Japanese badminton player previously affiliated with the Saishunkan Pharmaceutical Co Ltd corporate badminton team. She is the Women's Doubles bronze medalist at the 2024 Summer Olympics. Shida was part of the Japan winning team in the 2020 Asia Team Championships. She reached a career high as world number 2 in the BWF World rankings on 8 November 2022 with Nami Matsuyama. In September 2025, Shida began a new partnership with Arisa Igarashi then the pair split up and withdrew from the Japan National Badminton Team on 31 July 2026 following official announcements by their managing companies, AMD Sports Japan and BIPROGY, and the Badminton Association of Japan.

Shida is the bronze medalist at the Asian and World Junior Championships in 2014 and 2015. Shida won her first international title at the 2016 Vietnam International, and claimed her first BWF World Tour at the 2018 Chinese Taipei Open.

== Career ==
=== 2018–2020: Chinese Taipei Open–first World Tour title ===
Shida started the 2018 season as a semi-finalists in the Swiss Open in the women's doubles with Matsuyama. She then reached the mixed doubles final with Yunosuke Kubota in the Osaka International, losing to Kim Won-ho and Lee Yu-rim. She for the first time reached the final in the BWF World Tour, the Singapore Open, but she and her partner Matsuyama were defeated by their teammate Ayako Sakuramoto and Yukiko Takahata. Shida and Matsuyama also suffered defeat to Sakuramoto and Takahata in the final of the Akita and Bangka Belitung Indonesia Masters, while in the Vietnam Open they lose to Misato Aratama and Akane Watanabe. Shida and Matsuyama claimed their first ever World Tour title in the Chinese Taipei Open by beating Ayane Kurihara and Naru Shinoya. They ended the season ranked as world number 13.

In 2019 Shida and her partner, winning two title in the U.S. Open and Korea Masters, as well being a finalists in the Spain Masters and Swiss Open. In 2020, Shida joined Japan squad for the Asia Women's Team Championships, and won the gold medal after Japan beat South Korea in the final. Shida and Matsuyama best result in the World Tour were the semi-finalists in the Malaysia Masters.

=== 2021: Two title in the Indonesia badminton festival ===
Due to the COVID-19 pandemic, numerous tournaments on the BWF World Tour were either cancelled or rescheduled since 2020. Shida was included in the Japanese squad for the Sudirman and Uber Cup held in Denmark, where the team won the silver medals in both competition. The pair of Shida and Matsuyama proved their prowess by winning two tournaments at the Indonesia badminton festival, the Indonesia Masters and Indonesia Open, and becoming runners-up at the BWF World Tour Finals held in Bali at the end of 2021. Shida made her debut in the World Championships in Spain together with Matsuyama, reaching the quarter-finals. For their achievements, they entered top 10 in the BWF world ranking.

=== 2022–2023: All England Open title, and world #2 ===
Started the 2022 season as world number 7, Shida and Matsuyama won the All England Open title beating Zhang Shuxian and Zheng Yu in the final. They competed in the Asian Championships, but were eliminated in the quarter-finals to Chen Qingchen and Jia Yifan. The pair won their second title of the year in the Thailand Open by defeating Mayu Matsumoto and Wakana Nagahara in the final. Their good performance continue in the Indonesia Open triumph over Yuki Fukushima and Sayaka Hirota. They also made a history as the first ever women's doubles to win three consecutive BWF World Tour Super 1000 event. The duo also reached the finals in the Malaysia Masters, but have not been able to beat the world number 1 women's doubles pairing Chen and Jia. The duo qualified to compete in the World Championships, but their pace were stopped in the quarter-finals to Kim So-yeong and Kong Hee-yong. Shida and Matsuyama reached their career high as world number 2 in the BWF world ranking in November 2022.

In the beginning of the 2023 season, Shida and Matsuyama took an easy win over Chen and Jia to claimed the India Open title, due to ill-health suffered by Chen. Shida and Matsuyama then suffered five consecutive defeats from the new South Korean pairing Baek Ha-na and Lee So-hee; in the finals of the German Open, quarter-finals of the Malaysia Masters and Singapore Open, second round of the All England Open, and also in the first round of the Asian Championships. They then topped the podium at the Canada Open after won the final against Matsumoto and Nagahara. Chen and Jia are still too tough for Shida and Matsuyama. They have lost all of five meetings in the second half of the season; in the quarter-finals of the Japan Open, World Championships, and Asian Games; semi-finals of the China Open; and then in the final of the Denmark Open. The duo then won their third title of the year in the China Masters. Shida and Matsuyama qualified to compete in the year-end finals tournament, the BWF World Tour Finals, reaching to the semi-finals, where they were defeated by Baek and Lee.

=== 2024–2025: Olympic bronze, second All England title ===
Shida and her partner Matsuyama reached the finals in the French and Singapore Opens, but were defeated by Chen and Jia. They lost to Baek and Lee at the finals of All England Open in a close rubber game. Shida and Matsuyama qualified to compete in the 2024 Summer Olympics. In their debut at the Olympics, the duo managed to win a bronze medal. In the end of the season they were nominated as women's doubles player of the year by the Badminton World Federation. The duo also reached the World Tour Finals after beating their arch-rivals Chen and Jia in the semi-finals, but lost the title to Baek and Lee.

In 2025, Shida and Matsuyama clinched their second All England Open title and won the silver medal at the Asian Championships. In July 2025, Shida and Matsuyama announced they would part ways after a decade-long partnership, concluding their run together at the 2025 World Championships in Paris. Following the split, Shida formed a new partnership with Arisa Igarashi in September 2025. The new pair debuted at the Hong Kong Open, advancing to the quarter-finals.

=== 2026: Equipment sponsorship and withdrawal from the national team ===
Shida continued her women's doubles partnership with Igarashi into the 2026 season, experiencing early exits at the Malaysia Open, India Open, All England Open, and the Asian Championships. On 31 March 2026, Shida left the Kumamoto Saishunkan badminton team after a ten-year association to seek a new training environment. Off the court, she secured a new equipment sponsorship with Li-Ning, which released a player-edition signature racket in her name.

Returning to competition, Shida and Igarashi reached the semi-finals of the Singapore Open, their best World Tour result of the year. Following an early exit at the Indonesia Open in June, Shida's declining physical condition forced the pair to withdraw from the Japan Open and China Open.

On 31 July 2026, Shida and Igarashi announced the dissolution of their partnership, citing differences in their future directions and perspectives on the sport. That same day, Shida announced her withdrawal from the Japanese national team. Following her departure from Saishunkan in March and her split with Igarashi in July, Shida became an independent player based in Tokyo. With neither a regular training venue nor a partner, she accepted an invitation to train with Gifu Bluvic badminton club. After spending nearly two weeks training there, Shida chose Ririna Hiramoto, a fellow Aomori Yamada graduate and the 2024 World Junior champion, as her new partner. The pair made their international debut at the French Open in October. They advanced to the quarterfinals, defeating Sayaka Hirota and Ayako Sakuramoto in the second round before losing to Rin Iwanaga and Kie Nakanishi. Shida and Hiramoto reached their first final together at the Japan Masters. They defeated defending champions Pearly Tan and Thinaah Muralitharan in the first round before finishing as runners-up to Iwanaga and Nakanishi.

== Awards and nominations ==
Award	Year	Category	Result	Ref.
BWF Awards	2024	Women’s Doubles Player of the Year with Nami Matsuyama	Nominated	

== Achievements ==
=== Olympic Games ===
Women's doubles
Year	Venue	Partner	Opponent	Score	Result	Ref.
2024	Porte de La Chapelle Arena, Paris, France	(Japan) Nami Matsuyama	(Malaysia) Pearly Tan (Malaysia) Thinaah Muralitharan	21–11, 21–11	Bronze	

=== World Championships ===
Women's doubles
Year	Venue	Partner	Opponent	Score	Result	Ref.
2025	Adidas Arena, Paris, France	(Japan) Nami Matsuyama	(Malaysia) Pearly Tan (Malaysia) Thinaah Muralitharan	21–14, 13–21, 12–21	Bronze	

=== Asian Championships ===
Women's doubles
Year	Venue	Partner	Opponent	Score	Result	Ref.
2025	Ningbo Olympic Sports Center Gymnasium, Ningbo, China	(Japan) Nami Matsuyama	(China) Liu Shengshu (China) Tan Ning	15–21, 19–21	Silver	

=== World Junior Championships ===
Girls' doubles
Year	Venue	Partner	Opponent	Score	Result	Ref.
2015	Centro de Alto Rendimiento de La Videna, Lima, Peru	(Japan) Nami Matsuyama	(China) Du Yue (China) Li Yinhui	17–21, 21–14, 12–21	Bronze	

Mixed doubles
Year	Venue	Partner	Opponent	Score	Result	Ref.
2015	Centro de Alto Rendimiento de La Videna, Lima, Peru	(Japan) Shuto Morioka	(China) Zheng Siwei (China) Chen Qingchen	8–21, 12–21	Bronze	

=== Asian Junior Championships ===
Girls' doubles
Year	Venue	Partner	Opponent	Score	Result	Ref.
2015	CPB Badminton Training Center, Bangkok, Thailand	(Japan) Nami Matsuyama	(China) Chen Qingchen (China) Jia Yifan	11–21, 16–21	Bronze	

=== BWF World Tour (12 titles, 15 runners-up) ===
The BWF World Tour, which was announced on 19 March 2017 and implemented in 2018, is a series of elite badminton tournaments sanctioned by the Badminton World Federation (BWF). The BWF World Tour is divided into levels of World Tour Finals, Super 1000, Super 750, Super 500, Super 300, and the BWF Tour Super 100.

Women's doubles
Year	Tournament	Level	Partner	Opponent	Score	Result	Ref.
2018	Singapore Open	Super 500	(Japan) Nami Matsuyama	(Japan) Ayako Sakuramoto (Japan) Yukiko Takahata	21–16, 22–24, 13–21	(silver) Runner-up	
2018	Akita Masters	Super 100	(Japan) Nami Matsuyama	(Japan) Ayako Sakuramoto (Japan) Yukiko Takahata	21–23, 11–21	(silver) Runner-up	
2018	Vietnam Open	Super 100	(Japan) Nami Matsuyama	(Japan) Misato Aratama (Japan) Akane Watanabe	18–21, 19–21	(silver) Runner-up	
2018	Indonesia Masters	Super 100	(Japan) Nami Matsuyama	(Japan) Ayako Sakuramoto (Japan) Yukiko Takahata	21–11, 19–21, 20–22	(silver) Runner-up	
2018	Chinese Taipei Open	Super 300	(Japan) Nami Matsuyama	(Japan) Ayane Kurihara (Japan) Naru Shinoya	21–10, 21–17	(gold) Winner	
2019	Spain Masters	Super 300	(Japan) Nami Matsuyama	(South Korea) Kim So-yeong (South Korea) Kong Hee-yong	21–23, 21–15, 17–21	(silver) Runner-up	
2019	Swiss Open	Super 300	(Japan) Nami Matsuyama	(South Korea) Chang Ye-na (South Korea) Jung Kyung-eun	16–21, 13–21	(silver) Runner-up	
2019	U.S. Open	Super 300	(Japan) Nami Matsuyama	(South Korea) Baek Ha-na (South Korea) Jung Kyung-eun	21–16, 21–16	(gold) Winner	
2019	Korea Masters	Super 300	(Japan) Nami Matsuyama	(Japan) Misaki Matsutomo (Japan) Ayaka Takahashi	15–21, 21–17, 21–18	(gold) Winner	
2021	Indonesia Masters	Super 750	(Japan) Nami Matsuyama	(South Korea) Jeong Na-eun (South Korea) Kim Hye-jeong	21–9, 21–11	(gold) Winner	
2021	Indonesia Open	Super 1000	(Japan) Nami Matsuyama	(Indonesia) Greysia Polii (Indonesia) Apriyani Rahayu	21–19, 21–19	(gold) Winner	
2021	BWF World Tour Finals	World Tour Finals	(Japan) Nami Matsuyama	(South Korea) Kim So-yeong (South Korea) Kong Hee-yong	14–21, 14–21	(silver) Runner-up	
2022	All England Open	Super 1000	(Japan) Nami Matsuyama	(China) Zhang Shuxian (China) Zheng Yu	21–13, 21–9	(gold) Winner	
2022	Thailand Open	Super 500	(Japan) Nami Matsuyama	(Japan) Mayu Matsumoto (Japan) Wakana Nagahara	17–21, 21–15, 26–24	(gold) Winner	
2022	Indonesia Open	Super 1000	(Japan) Nami Matsuyama	(Japan) Yuki Fukushima (Japan) Sayaka Hirota	18–21, 21–14, 21–17	(gold) Winner	
2022	Malaysia Masters	Super 500	(Japan) Nami Matsuyama	(China) Chen Qingchen (China) Jia Yifan	11–21, 12–21	(silver) Runner-up	
2023	India Open	Super 750	(Japan) Nami Matsuyama	(China) Chen Qingchen (China) Jia Yifan	Walkover	(gold) Winner	
2023	German Open	Super 300	(Japan) Nami Matsuyama	(South Korea) Baek Ha-na (South Korea) Lee So-hee	19–21, 15–21	(silver) Runner-up	
2023	Canada Open	Super 500	(Japan) Nami Matsuyama	(Japan) Mayu Matsumoto (Japan) Wakana Nagahara	22–20, 21–16	(gold) Winner	
2023	Denmark Open	Super 750	(Japan) Nami Matsuyama	(China) Chen Qingchen (China) Jia Yifan	16–21, 13–21	(silver) Runner-up	
2023	China Masters	Super 750	(Japan) Nami Matsuyama	(Japan) Yuki Fukushima (Japan) Sayaka Hirota	21–18, 21–11	(gold) Winner	
2024	French Open	Super 750	(Japan) Nami Matsuyama	(China) Chen Qingchen (China) Jia Yifan	12–21, 21–19, 22–24	(silver) Runner-up	
2024	All England Open	Super 1000	(Japan) Nami Matsuyama	(South Korea) Baek Ha-na (South Korea) Lee So-hee	19–21, 21–11, 17–21	(silver) Runner-up	
2024	Singapore Open	Super 750	(Japan) Nami Matsuyama	(China) Chen Qingchen (China) Jia Yifan	15–21, 12–21	(silver) Runner-up	
2024	BWF World Tour Finals	World Tour Finals	(Japan) Nami Matsuyama	(South Korea) Baek Ha-na (South Korea) Lee So-hee	19–21, 14–21	(silver) Runner-up	
2025	All England Open	Super 1000	(Japan) Nami Matsuyama	(Japan) Yuki Fukushima (Japan) Mayu Matsumoto	21–16, 14–21, 21–17	(gold) Winner	
2026	Japan Masters	Super 500	(Japan) Ririna Hiramoto	(Japan) Rin Iwanaga (Japan) Kie Nakanishi	19–21, 15–21	(silver) Runner-up	

=== BWF International Challenge/Series (2 titles, 2 runners-up) ===
Women's doubles
Year	Tournament	Partner	Opponent	Score	Result	Ref.
2016	Vietnam International	(Japan) Yuki Fukushima	(Japan) Shiho Tanaka (Japan) Koharu Yonemoto	28–26, 21–15	(gold) Winner	
2016	Spanish International	(Japan) Yuki Fukushima	(Japan) Sayaka Hirota (Japan) Nao Ono	14–21, 21–13, 19–21	(silver) Runner-up	
2017	Smiling Fish International	(Japan) Nami Matsuyama	(Japan) Chisato Hoshi (Japan) Naru Shinoya	21–19, 21–14	(gold) Winner	

Mixed doubles
Year	Tournament	Partner	Opponent	Score	Result	Ref.
2018	Osaka International	(Japan) Yunosuke Kubota	(South Korea) Kim Won-ho (South Korea) Lee Yu-rim	17–21, 12–21	(silver) Runner-up	

BWF International Challenge tournament
