= Badminton at the 2024 Summer Olympics – Qualification =

This article details the qualifying phase for badminton at the 2024 Summer Olympics. The competition comprised a total of 172 badminton players, with an equal distribution between men and women, coming from the different National Olympic Committees (NOCs), similar to those in the previous editions. The qualification period commenced on May 1, 2023, and concluded on April 28, 2024, with the final eligibility list published two days after the deadline.

NOCs could enter a maximum of two players each in the men's and women's singles if they were ranked within the top sixteen of the "Race to Paris" ranking list, respectively; otherwise, they sent a single player until the roster of thirty-eight was complete. Similar protocols also applied to the players competing in the doubles tournament as the NOCs could enter a maximum of two pairs if they were ranked in the top eight with the rest entitled to a single pair until the quota of sixteen was reached.

== Standards ==
The remaining badminton players underwent a direct qualifying process to secure a spot in their respective categories for Paris 2024 through the "Race to Paris" ranking list prepared by the Badminton World Federation. The qualification period commenced on May 1, 2023, and concluded on April 28, 2024, with the final eligibility list published two days after the deadline (April 30, 2024). The qualification pathway for Paris 2024 produced a total of sixteen pairs each in the doubles tournaments (men's, women's, and mixed) and an initial distribution of thirty-eight (38) players in the singles based on the following criteria:

- Singles:
  - Ranking 1-16: Players will alternate. NOCs may enter a maximum of two players if they are placed within the top sixteen of the BWF World Rankings.
  - Ranking 17 and below: Players will alternate. NOCs may enter a maximum of a single player.
- Doubles:
  - Rankings 1–8: Pairs will alternate. NOCs may enter a maximum of two pairs if they are placed within the top eight of the BWF World Rankings.
  - Rankings 9 and below: Pairs will alternate. NOCs may enter a maximum of a single pair.

Each of the five continental zones must have entered at least one player in the singles tournament and a pair in the doubles under the rules and regulations of the BWF Continental Representation Place system. If unsatisfied by the entry selection method described above, the highest-ranked eligible player or pair from the respective continental zone qualified for Paris 2024. NOCs could enter badminton players or pairs in a maximum of two events through the BWF Continental Representation Place system; if the NOC qualified for more than two events through the system, the NOC must have selected which of them is qualified, and the quota place declined transfers to the next highest-ranked eligible player or pair.

Host nation France reserved a spot each in the men's and women's singles to be officially awarded to its respective highest-ranked badminton player based on the BWF "Race to Paris" ranking list. If one or more French badminton players qualified directly, their slots would be reallocated to the next highest-ranked eligible player from the official "Race to Paris" list. Meanwhile, four places (two per gender) were entitled to the eligible NOCs interested to have badminton players compete for Paris 2024 under the Universality principle. These places were included in the BWF Continental Representation Place system.

If any badminton player qualified for both the singles and the doubles events, an unused spot would be awarded to the next highest-ranked eligible player of a respective gender in the singles tournament based on the official "Race to Paris" list. These protocols must ascertain a fair distribution between men and women qualifying for their respective events at the Games with the singles tournaments expanding from 38 to accommodate additional players.

== Summary ==
NOC	Men		Women		Mixed	Total	
NOC	Singles	Doubles	Singles	Doubles	Doubles	Quotas	Athletes
Algeria					1	1	2
Australia			1	1		2	3
Austria	1					1	1
Azerbaijan	1		1			2	2
Belgium	1		1			2	2
Brazil	1		1			2	2
Bulgaria			1	1		2	3
Canada	1	1	1			3	4
China	2	2	2	2	2	10	16
Chinese Taipei	1	1	1		1	4	6
Czech Republic	1	1	1			3	4
Denmark	2	1	1	1	1	6	9
El Salvador	1					1	1
Estonia			1			1	1
Finland	1					1	1
France	1	1	1	1	1	5	7
Germany	1	1	1			3	4
Great Britain		1	1			2	3
Guatemala	1					1	1
Hong Kong	1		1	1	1	4	6
India	2	1	1	1		5	7
Indonesia	2	1	1	1	1	6	9
Ireland	1		1			2	2
Israel	1					1	1
Italy	1					1	1
Japan	2	1	2	2	1	8	12
Kazakhstan	1					1	1
Malaysia	1	1	1	1	1	5	8
Maldives			1			1	1
Mauritius	1		1			2	2
Mexico	1					1	1
Myanmar			1			1	1
Nepal	1					1	1
Netherlands					1	1	2
Nigeria	1					1	1
Peru			1			1	1
Refugee Olympic Team			1			1	1
Singapore	1		1		1	3	4
South Africa			1			1	1
South Korea	1	1	2	2	2	8	12
Spain	1		1			2	2
Sri Lanka	1					1	1
Suriname	1					1	1
Switzerland	1		1			2	2
Thailand	1	1	2	1	1	6	9
Turkey			1			1	1
Ukraine			1			1	1
United States	1	1	1	1	1	5	7
Vietnam	1		1			2	2
Total: 49 NOCs	41	16	39	16	16	128	173

== Official ranking ==
=== Men's singles ===
BWF Update List: April 30, 2024
No.	QR	Player	Country	Notes
1	1	Viktor Axelsen	Denmark	Continental place: Europe
2	2	Shi Yuqi	China	Continental place: Asia
3	3	Jonatan Christie	Indonesia	Continental place: Asia
4	4	Anders Antonsen	Denmark	Continental place: Europe
5	5	Kodai Naraoka	Japan	
6	6	Li Shifeng	China	
7	7	Anthony Sinisuka Ginting	Indonesia	
8	8	Kunlavut Vitidsarn	Thailand	
9	9	Prannoy H. S.	India	
10	10	Lee Zii Jia	Malaysia	
11	11	Kenta Nishimoto	Japan	
12	12	Loh Kean Yew	Singapore	
13	13	Lakshya Sen	India	
14	14	Chou Tien-chen	Chinese Taipei	
15	15	Lee Cheuk Yiu	Hong Kong	
16	20	Toma Junior Popov	France	
17	24	Brian Yang	Canada	Continental place: America
18	38	Kevin Cordón	Guatemala	Continental place: America
19	42	Nhat Nguyen	Ireland	
20	43	Julien Carraggi	Belgium	
—	45	Mark Caljouw	Netherlands	Declined
21	47	Jeon Hyeok-jin	South Korea	
22	48	Ygor Coelho	Brazil	
23	51	Misha Zilberman	Israel	
24	54	Jan Louda	Czech Republic	
25	56	Uriel Canjura	El Salvador	
26	57	Kalle Koljonen	Finland	
27	58	Ade Resky Dwicahyo	Azerbaijan	
28	67	Luis Ramón Garrido	Mexico	
29	68	Pablo Abián	Spain	
30	69	Dmitriy Panarin	Kazakhstan	
31	72	Viren Nettasinghe	Sri Lanka	Host quota reallocation
32	73	Giovanni Toti	Italy	Doubles quota reallocation
33	74	Lê Đức Phát	Vietnam	Doubles quota reallocation
34	77	Fabian Roth	Germany	Doubles quota reallocation
35	78	Howard Shu	United States	Oceanian Continental quota reallocation
36	88	Tobias Künzi	Switzerland	Oceanian Continental quota reallocation
37	89	Collins Valentine Filimon	Austria	Declined quota reallocation
38	101	Anuoluwapo Juwon Opeyori	Nigeria	Continental place: Africa
39	112	Julien Paul	Mauritius	Continental place: Africa
—	159	Ricky Tang	Australia	Continental place: Oceania (Declined)
—	196	Edward Lau	New Zealand	Continental place: Oceania (Declined)
40	179	Prince Dahal	Nepal	Tripartite Invitation
41	286	Sören Opti	Suriname	Tripartite Invitation

=== Women's singles ===
BWF Update List: April 30, 2024
No.	QR	Player	Country	Notes
1	1	An Se-young	South Korea	Continental place: Asia
2	2	Chen Yufei	China	Continental place: Asia
3	3	Carolina Marín	Spain	Continental place: Europe
4	4	Akane Yamaguchi	Japan	
5	5	Tai Tzu-ying	Chinese Taipei	
6	6	He Bingjiao	China	
7	9	Gregoria Mariska Tunjung	Indonesia	
8	10	Beiwen Zhang	United States	Continental place: America
9	11	Aya Ohori	Japan	
10	12	Ratchanok Intanon	Thailand	
11	13	Kim Ga-eun	South Korea	
12	14	P. V. Sindhu	India	
13	16	Supanida Katethong	Thailand	
14	18	Yeo Jia Min	Singapore	
—	21	Line Kjærsfeldt	Denmark	Declined by the Danish Badminton Federation, and replaced by Mia Blichfeldt
15	22	Mia Blichfeldt	Denmark	Continental place: Europe
16	23	Kirsty Gilmour	Great Britain	
17	24	Nguyễn Thùy Linh	Vietnam	
18	25	Michelle Li	Canada	Continental place: America
19	29	Yvonne Li	Germany	
20	32	Goh Jin Wei	Malaysia	
21	35	Neslihan Arın	Turkey	
22	43	Thet Htar Thuzar	Myanmar	
23	45	Qi Xuefei	France	
24	46	Lo Sin Yan	Hong Kong	
25	47	Juliana Viana Vieira	Brazil	
26	49	Lianne Tan	Belgium	
27	50	Kristin Kuuba	Estonia	
28	63	Inés Castillo	Peru	
29	65	Tereza Švábíková	Czech Republic	
30	69	Jenjira Stadelmann	Switzerland	
31	71	Keisha Fatimah Azzahra	Azerbaijan	
32	74	Polina Buhrova	Ukraine	Host quota reallocation
33	76	Kaloyana Nalbantova	Bulgaria	Unused Oceania quota reallocation
34	77	Rachael Darragh	Ireland	Tripartite invitation quota reallocation
35	92	Tiffany Ho	Australia	Continental place: Oceania
36	104	Kate Ludik	Mauritius	Continental place: Africa
37	105	Johanita Scholtz	South Africa	Continental place: Africa
38	115	Fathimath Nabaaha Abdul Razzaq	Maldives	Tripartite Invitation
39	1100	Dorsa Yavarivafa	Refugee Olympic Team	Invitational place

=== Men's doubles ===
BWF Update List: April 30, 2024
No.	QR	Player	Country	Notes
1	1	Liang Weikeng	China	Continental quota: Asia
1	1	Wang Chang	China	Continental quota: Asia
2	2	Kang Min-hyuk	South Korea	
2	2	Seo Seung-jae	South Korea	
3	3	Satwiksairaj Rankireddy	India	
3	3	Chirag Shetty	India	
4	4	Kim Astrup	Denmark	Continental quota: Europe
4	4	Anders Skaarup Rasmussen	Denmark	Continental quota: Europe
5	5	Aaron Chia	Malaysia	
5	5	Soh Wooi Yik	Malaysia	
6	6	Takuro Hoki	Japan	
6	6	Yugo Kobayashi	Japan	
7	7	Fajar Alfian	Indonesia	
7	7	Muhammad Rian Ardianto	Indonesia	
8	8	Liu Yuchen	China	
8	8	Ou Xuanyi	China	
9	10	Lee Yang	Chinese Taipei	
9	10	Wang Chi-lin	Chinese Taipei	
10	19	Ben Lane	Great Britain	
10	19	Sean Vendy	Great Britain	
11	22	Supak Jomkoh	Thailand	
11	22	Kittinupong Kedren	Thailand	
12	27	Mark Lamsfuß	Germany	
12	27	Marvin Seidel	Germany	
13	34	Adam Dong	Canada	Continental quota: America
13	34	Nyl Yakura	Canada	Continental quota: America
14	37	Christo Popov	France	
14	37	Toma Junior Popov	France	
15	42	Vinson Chiu	United States	
15	42	Joshua Yuan	United States	
16	44	Ondřej Král	Czech Republic	
16	44	Adam Mendrek	Czech Republic	

=== Women's doubles ===
BWF Update List: April 30, 2024
No.	QR	Player	Country	Notes
1	1	Chen Qingchen	China	Continental quota: Asia
1	1	Jia Yifan	China	Continental quota: Asia
2	2	Baek Ha-na	South Korea	
2	2	Lee So-hee	South Korea	
3	3	Liu Shengshu	China	
3	3	Tan Ning	China	
4	4	Nami Matsuyama	Japan	
4	4	Chiharu Shida	Japan	
5	6	Kim So-yeong	South Korea	
5	6	Kong Hee-yong	South Korea	
6	7	Mayu Matsumoto	Japan	
6	7	Wakana Nagahara	Japan	
7	9	Apriyani Rahayu	Indonesia	
7	9	Siti Fadia Silva Ramadhanti	Indonesia	
8	10	Jongkolphan Kititharakul	Thailand	
8	10	Rawinda Prajongjai	Thailand	
9	14	Pearly Tan	Malaysia	
9	14	Thinaah Muralitharan	Malaysia	
10	17	Margot Lambert	France	Continental quota: Europe
10	17	Anne Tran	France	Continental quota: Europe
11	19	Gabriela Stoeva	Bulgaria	
11	19	Stefani Stoeva	Bulgaria	
12	20	Yeung Nga Ting	Hong Kong	
12	20	Yeung Pui Lam	Hong Kong	
13	21	Tanisha Crasto	India	
13	21	Ashwini Ponnappa	India	
14	22	Maiken Fruergaard	Denmark	
14	22	Sara Thygesen	Denmark	
15	31	Annie Xu	United States	Continental quota: America
15	31	Kerry Xu	United States	Continental quota: America
16	32	Setyana Mapasa	Australia	Continental quota: Oceania
16	32	Angela Yu	Australia	Continental quota: Oceania

=== Mixed doubles ===
BWF Update List: April 30, 2024
No.	QR	Player	Country	Notes
1	1	Zheng Siwei	China	Continental quota: Asia
1	1	Huang Yaqiong	China	Continental quota: Asia
2	2	Feng Yanzhe	China	
2	2	Huang Dongping	China	
3	3	Yuta Watanabe	Japan	
3	3	Arisa Higashino	Japan	
4	4	Seo Seung-jae	South Korea	
4	4	Chae Yoo-jung	South Korea	
5	6	Dechapol Puavaranukroh	Thailand	
5	6	Sapsiree Taerattanachai	Thailand	
6	7	Kim Won-ho	South Korea	
6	7	Jeong Na-eun	South Korea	
7	8	Tang Chun Man	Hong Kong	
7	8	Tse Ying Suet	Hong Kong	
8	9	Chen Tang Jie	Malaysia	
8	9	Toh Ee Wei	Malaysia	
9	10	Mathias Christiansen	Denmark	Continental quota: Europe
9	10	Alexandra Bøje	Denmark	Continental quota: Europe
10	11	Thom Gicquel	France	
10	11	Delphine Delrue	France	
11	12	Ye Hong-wei	Chinese Taipei	
11	12	Lee Chia-hsin	Chinese Taipei	
12	14	Robin Tabeling	Netherlands	
12	14	Selena Piek	Netherlands	
13	15	Rinov Rivaldy	Indonesia	
13	15	Pitha Haningtyas Mentari	Indonesia	
14	18	Terry Hee	Singapore	Oceanian Continental quota reallocation
14	18	Tan Wei Han	Singapore	Oceanian Continental quota reallocation
15	29	Vinson Chiu	United States	Continental quota: America
15	29	Jennie Gai	United States	Continental quota: America
—	44	Kenneth Choo	Australia	Continental quota: Oceania (Declined)
—	44	Gronya Somerville	Australia	Continental quota: Oceania (Declined)
16	47	Koceila Mammeri	Algeria	Continental quota: Africa
16	47	Tanina Mammeri	Algeria	Continental quota: Africa
