= Badminton at the 2024 Summer Olympics – Women's doubles =

Women's doubles at the Games of the XXXIII Olympiad
- Venue: Porte de La Chapelle Arena
- Date: 27 July – 3 August 2024
- Competitors: 32 from 13 nations
- Teams: 16

Medalists
1st place, gold medalist(s)		Chen Qingchen; Jia Yifan	China
2nd place, silver medalist(s)		Liu Shengshu; Tan Ning	China
3rd place, bronze medalist(s)		Nami Matsuyama; Chiharu Shida	Japan

The women's doubles badminton tournament at the 2024 Summer Olympics took place from 27 July to 3 August at the Porte de La Chapelle Arena in Paris. There were 16 pairs (32 players) from 13 nations competing.

China's Chen Qingchen and Jia Yifan, whom were the silver medalists in the women's doubles event in 2020, defeated compatriots Liu Shengshu and Tan Ning in the final, 22–20, 21–15, to win the gold medal in women's doubles badminton at the 2024 Summer Olympics. Their win marked the 20th time China has won the gold medal in Olympics badminton since the sport's inclusion in 1992, and the final featured two Chinese women's doubles teams for the first time since 2004. In the bronze-medal match, Japan's Nami Matsuyama and Chiharu Shida defeated Malaysia's Pearly Tan and Thinaah Muralitharan 21–11, 21–11.

Indonesian pair Greysia Polii and Apriyani Rahayu were the winners of the previous edition in Tokyo, but Polii retired from international badminton in June 2022. Rahayu partnered with Siti Fadia Silva Ramadhanti, but failed to advance from the group stage.

== Format ==
The 16 teams were split into four groups of four pairs each. They played a round-robin tournament with the top-two ranked teams advancing to the knockout stage. Each match was played in a best-of-3.

== Schedule ==
The schedule is as follows.

Legend

P	Preliminaries	QF	Quarter-finals	SF	Semi-finals	M	Medal matches

27 Jul	28 Jul	29 Jul	30 Jul	31 Jul	1 Aug	2 Aug	3 Aug
P					QF	SF	M

== Draw ==
The group stage draw was held on 12 July 2024. The knockout stage draw was held on 30 July 2024.

== Seeds ==
The top four teams of the BWF World Ranking were seeded.

1. Chen Qingchen / Jia Yifan (CHN) (gold medalists)
2. Baek Ha-na / Lee So-hee (KOR) (quarter-finals)
3. Liu Shengshu / Tan Ning (CHN) (silver medalists)
4. Nami Matsuyama / Chiharu Shida (JPN) (bronze medalists)

== Group stage ==
All times are local (UTC+2).

=== Group A ===
Pos	Team	Pld	W	L	GF	GA	GD	PF	PA	PD	Pts	Qualification
1	Chen Qingchen / Jia Yifan (CHN)	3	3	0	6	0	+6	130	102	+28	3	Quarter-finals
2	Pearly Tan / Thinaah Muralitharan (MAS)	3	2	1	4	3	+1	139	122	+17	2	Quarter-finals
3	Mayu Matsumoto / Wakana Nagahara (JPN)	3	1	2	3	4	−1	128	139	−11	1	
4	Apriyani Rahayu / Siti Fadia Silva Ramadhanti (INA)	3	0	3	0	6	−6	98	132	−34	0	

Source: Olympics

Date	Time	Player 1	Score	Player 2	Set 1	Set 2	Set 3	Report
27 July	10:10	Chen Qingchen (China); Jia Yifan (China)	2–0	(Malaysia) Pearly Tan (Malaysia) Thinaah Muralitharan	21–17	22–20		Report
27 July	11:00	Mayu Matsumoto (Japan); Wakana Nagahara (Japan)	2–0	(Indonesia) Apriyani Rahayu (Indonesia) Siti Fadia Silva Ramadhanti	24–22	21–15		Report
28 July	08:30	Mayu Matsumoto (Japan); Wakana Nagahara (Japan)	1–2	(Malaysia) Pearly Tan (Malaysia) Thinaah Muralitharan	21–18	15–21	16–21	Report
28 July	10:10	Chen Qingchen (China); Jia Yifan (China)	2–0	(Indonesia) Apriyani Rahayu (Indonesia) Siti Fadia Silva Ramadhanti	21–12	24–22		Report
30 July	09:20	Chen Qingchen (China); Jia Yifan (China)	2–0	(Japan) Mayu Matsumoto (Japan) Wakana Nagahara	21–16	21–15		Report
30 July	10:10	Apriyani Rahayu (Indonesia); Siti Fadia Silva Ramadhanti (Indonesia)	0–2	(Malaysia) Pearly Tan (Malaysia) Thinaah Muralitharan	18–21	9–21		Report

=== Group B ===
Pos	Team	Pld	W	L	GF	GA	GD	PF	PA	PD	Pts	Qualification
1	Liu Shengshu / Tan Ning (CHN)	3	3	0	6	1	+5	145	105	+40	3	Quarter-finals
2	Gabriela Stoeva / Stefani Stoeva (BUL)	3	2	1	5	3	+2	152	140	+12	2	Quarter-finals
3	Yeung Nga Ting / Yeung Pui Lam (HKG)	3	1	2	3	5	−2	144	160	−16	1	
4	Annie Xu / Kerry Xu (USA)	3	0	3	1	6	−5	110	146	−36	0	

Source: Olympics

Date	Time	Player 1	Score	Player 2	Set 1	Set 2	Set 3	Report
27 July	14:00	Liu Shengshu (China); Tan Ning (China)	2–0	(United States) Annie Xu (United States) Kerry Xu	21–11	21–14		Report
27 July	14:00	Yeung Nga Ting (Hong Kong); Yeung Pui Lam (Hong Kong)	1–2	(Bulgaria) Gabriela Stoeva (Bulgaria) Stefani Stoeva	11–21	23–21	15–21	Report
28 July	15:40	Liu Shengshu (China); Tan Ning (China)	2–1	(Bulgaria) Gabriela Stoeva (Bulgaria) Stefani Stoeva	19–21	21–10	21–16	Report
28 July	20:20	Yeung Nga Ting (Hong Kong); Yeung Pui Lam (Hong Kong)	2–1	(United States) Annie Xu (United States) Kerry Xu	24–22	17–21	21–12	Report
30 July	09:20	Gabriela Stoeva (Bulgaria); Stefani Stoeva (Bulgaria)	2–0	(United States) Annie Xu (United States) Kerry Xu	21–18	21–12		Report
30 July	10:10	Liu Shengshu (China); Tan Ning (China)	2–0	(Hong Kong) Yeung Nga Ting (Hong Kong) Yeung Pui Lam	21–18	21–15		Report

=== Group C ===
Pos	Team	Pld	W	L	GF	GA	GD	PF	PA	PD	Pts	Qualification
1	Kim So-yeong / Kong Hee-yong (KOR)	3	3	0	6	0	+6	134	103	+31	3	Quarter-finals
2	Nami Matsuyama / Chiharu Shida (JPN)	3	2	1	4	2	+2	130	105	+25	2	Quarter-finals
3	Setyana Mapasa / Angela Yu (AUS)	3	1	2	2	4	−2	103	109	−6	1	
4	Tanisha Crasto / Ashwini Ponnappa (IND)	3	0	3	0	6	−6	76	126	−50	0	

Source: Olympics

Date	Time	Player 1	Score	Player 2	Set 1	Set 2	Set 3	Report
27 July	20:20	Kim So-yeong (South Korea); Kong Hee-yong (South Korea)	2–0	(India) Tanisha Crasto (India) Ashwini Ponnappa	21–18	21–10		Report
27 July	20:20	Nami Matsuyama (Japan); Chiharu Shida (Japan)	2–0	(Australia) Setyana Mapasa (Australia) Angela Yu	21–18	21–14		Report
29 July	09:20	Nami Matsuyama (Japan); Chiharu Shida (Japan)	2–0	(India) Tanisha Crasto (India) Ashwini Ponnappa	21–11	21–12		Report
29 July	10:10	Kim So-yeong (South Korea); Kong Hee-yong (South Korea)	2–0	(Australia) Setyana Mapasa (Australia) Angela Yu	21–12	21–17		Report
30 July	14:00	Nami Matsuyama (Japan); Chiharu Shida (Japan)	0–2	(South Korea) Kim So-yeong (South Korea) Kong Hee-yong	22–24	24–26		Report
30 July	14:50	Tanisha Crasto (India); Ashwini Ponnappa (India)	0–2	(Australia) Setyana Mapasa (Australia) Angela Yu	15–21	10–21		Report

=== Group D ===
Pos	Team	Pld	W	L	GF	GA	GD	PF	PA	PD	Pts	Qualification
1	Maiken Fruergaard / Sara Thygesen (DEN)	3	3	0	6	2	+4	160	146	+14	3	Quarter-finals
2	Baek Ha-na / Lee So-hee (KOR)	3	2	1	5	2	+3	137	93	+44	2	Quarter-finals
3	Jongkolphan Kititharakul / Rawinda Prajongjai (THA)	3	1	2	3	5	−2	140	158	−18	1	
4	Margot Lambert / Anne Tran (FRA)	3	0	3	1	6	−5	98	138	−40	0	

Source: Olympics

Date	Time	Player 1	Score	Player 2	Set 1	Set 2	Set 3	Report
27 July	20:20	Baek Ha-na (South Korea); Lee So-hee (South Korea)	1–2	(Denmark) Maiken Fruergaard (Denmark) Sara Thygesen	18–21	21–9	14–21	Report
27 July	22:00	Jongkolphan Kititharakul (Thailand); Rawinda Prajongjai (Thailand)	2–1	(France) Margot Lambert (France) Anne Tran	12–21	21–13	21–15	Report
29 July	14:50	Baek Ha-na (South Korea); Lee So-hee (South Korea)	2–0	(France) Margot Lambert (France) Anne Tran	21–13	21–8		Report
29 July	19:30	Jongkolphan Kititharakul (Thailand); Rawinda Prajongjai (Thailand)	1–2	(Denmark) Maiken Fruergaard (Denmark) Sara Thygesen	22–20	21–23	22–24	Report
30 July	21:10	Baek Ha-na (South Korea); Lee So-hee (South Korea)	2–0	(Thailand) Jongkolphan Kititharakul (Thailand) Rawinda Prajongjai	21–9	21–12		Report
30 July	21:10	Margot Lambert (France); Anne Tran (France)	0–2	(Denmark) Maiken Fruergaard (Denmark) Sara Thygesen	16–21	12–21		Report

== Knockout stage ==
Quarter-finals
Chen Qingchen (CHN); Jia Yifan (CHN)	21	21
Gabriela Stoeva (BUL); Stefani Stoeva (BUL)	15	8
Kim So-yeong (KOR); Kong Hee-yong (KOR)	12	13
Pearly Tan (MAS); Thinaah Muralitharan (MAS)	21	21
Baek Ha-na (KOR); Lee So-hee (KOR)	9	13
Liu Shengshu (CHN); Tan Ning (CHN)	21	21
Nami Matsuyama (JPN); Chiharu Shida (JPN)	21	21
Maiken Fruergaard (DEN); Sara Thygesen (DEN)	7	12

Semi-finals
Chen Qingchen (CHN); Jia Yifan (CHN)	21	18	21
Pearly Tan (MAS); Thinaah Muralitharan (MAS)	12	21	15
Liu Shengshu (CHN); Tan Ning (CHN)	21	21
Nami Matsuyama (JPN); Chiharu Shida (JPN)	16	19

Gold medal match
Chen Qingchen (CHN); Jia Yifan (CHN)	22	21
Liu Shengshu (CHN); Tan Ning (CHN)	20	15
Bronze medal match
Pearly Tan (MAS); Thinaah Muralitharan (MAS)	11	11
Nami Matsuyama (JPN); Chiharu Shida (JPN)	21	21
