= 2019 U.S. Open (badminton) =

Badminton championships

Tournament details
- Dates: 9–14 July
- Level: Super 300
- Total prize money: US$150,000
- Venue: Titan Gym
- Location: Fullerton, California, United States

Champions
- Men's singles: (Chinese Taipei) Lin Chun-yi
- Women's singles: (China) Wang Zhiyi
- Men's doubles: (South Korea) Ko Sung-hyun (South Korea) Shin Baek-choel
- Women's doubles: (Japan) Nami Matsuyama (Japan) Chiharu Shida
- Mixed doubles: (Chinese Taipei) Lee Jhe-huei (Chinese Taipei) Hsu Ya-ching

The 2019 U.S. Open (officially known as the Yonex US Open 2019 for sponsorship reasons) was a badminton tournament which took place at Titan Gym in Fullerton, California, United States, from 9 to 14 July 2019 and had a total purse of $150,000.

== Tournament ==
The 2019 U.S. Open was the thirteenth tournament of the 2019 BWF World Tour and was also a part of the U.S. Open championships which has been held since 1954. This tournament was organized by the USA Badminton and sanctioned by the BWF.

=== Venue ===
This international tournament was held at Titan Gym in Fullerton, California, United States.

=== Point distribution ===
Below is the point distribution table for each phase of the tournament based on the BWF points system for the BWF World Tour Super 300 event.

Winner	Runner-up	3/4	5/8	9/16	17/32	33/64	65/128
7,000	5,950	4,900	3,850	2,750	1,670	660	320

=== Prize money ===
The total prize money for this tournament was US$150,000. Distribution of prize money was in accordance with BWF regulations.

Event	Winner	Finals	Semi-finals	Quarter-finals	Last 16
Singles	$11,250	$5,700	$2,175	$900	$525
Doubles	$11,850	$5,700	$2,100	$1,087.50	$562.50

== Men's singles ==
=== Seeds ===
1. (South Korea) Lee Dong-keun (quarter-finals)
2. (India) Prannoy Kumar (quarter-finals)
3. (Netherlands) Mark Caljouw (first round)
4. (Chinese Taipei) Wang Tzu-wei (second round)
5. (England) Rajiv Ouseph (first round)
6. (India) Parupalli Kashyap (first round)
7. (Japan) Kazumasa Sakai (second round)
8. (France) Thomas Rouxel (first round)

=== Finals ===
Semi-finals
Q3	(Chinese Taipei) Lin Chun-yi	15	21	21
(Chinese Taipei) Lin Yu-hsien	21	19	17
(Thailand) Tanongsak Saensomboonsuk	21	21
(India) Sourabh Verma	9	18

Final
Q3	(Chinese Taipei) Lin Chun-yi	21	21
(Thailand) Tanongsak Saensomboonsuk	10	13

=== Top half ===
==== Section 1 ====
First round
1	(South Korea) Lee D-k	21	21
(China) Zhou ZQ	9	10
(Denmark) V Svendsen	13	11
(Japan) K Watanabe	21	21
8	(France) T Rouxel	21	18	16
Q4	(China) Li SF	15	21	21
(Brazil) Y Coelho de Oliveira	20	11
Q3	(Chinese Taipei) Lin C-y	22	21

Second round
1	(South Korea) Lee D-k	20	21	21
(Japan) K Watanabe	22	13	17
Q4	(China) Li SF	13	21	16
Q3	(Chinese Taipei) Lin C-y	21	19	21

Quarter-finals
1	(South Korea) Lee D-k	12	14
Q3	(Chinese Taipei) Lin C-y	21	21

==== Section 2 ====
First round
3	(Netherlands) M Caljouw	17	11
(Chinese Taipei) Lin Y-h	21	21
Q1	(Chinese Taipei) Lee C-h	15	21	22
(Canada) J Ho-shue	21	18	20
5	(England) R Ouseph	21	19	18
(France) L Corvée	16	21	21
(Germany) K Schäfer	12	14
(Canada) Sheng XD	21	21

Second round
(Chinese Taipei) Lin Y-h	14	23	21
Q1	(Chinese Taipei) Lee C-h	21	21	16
(France) L Corvée	21	21
(Canada) Sheng XD	18	17

Quarter-finals
(Chinese Taipei) Lin Y-h	21	21
(France) L Corvée	8	14

=== Bottom half ===
==== Section 3 ====
First round
(Thailand) T Saensomboonsuk	18	21	21
(France) L Claerbout	21	14	12
WC	(United States) T Lam	13	7
7	(Japan) K Sakai	21	21
Q2	(China) Sun FX	21	26
(Spain) L E Peñalver	14	24
(India) A Jayaram	16	21	16
4	(Chinese Taipei) Wang T-w	21	18	21

Second round
(Thailand) T Saensomboonsuk	21	21
7	(Japan) K Sakai	14	12
Q2	(China) Sun FX	21	21
4	(Chinese Taipei) Wang T-w	9	15

Quarter-finals
(Thailand) T Saensomboonsuk	16	21	21
Q2	(China) Sun FX	21	18	12

==== Section 4 ====
First round
(India) S Verma	21	21	22
(England) T Penty	23	15	20
(India) L Sen	21	21
6	(India) P Kashyap	11	18
(Spain) P Abián	16	9
(South Korea) Heo K-h	21	21
(Japan) Y Igarashi	23	22	18
2	(India) Prannoy K	21	24	21

Second round
(India) S Verma	21	19	21
(India) L Sen	11	21	12
(South Korea) Heo K-h	16	21	16
2	(India) Prannoy K	21	18	21

Quarter-finals
(India) S Verma	21	23
2	(India) Prannoy K	19	21

== Women's singles ==
=== Seeds ===
1. (Canada) Michelle Li (semi-finals)
2. (Japan) Saena Kawakami (second round)
3. (South Korea) Kim Ga-eun (final)
4. (China) Zhang Yiman (first round)
5. (South Korea) An Se-young (quarter-finals)
6. (Japan) Ayumi Mine (semi-finals)
7. (South Korea) Kim Hyo-min (quarter-finals)
8. (Thailand) Porntip Buranaprasertsuk (second round)

=== Finals ===
Semi-finals
1	(Canada) Michelle Li	16	8
3	(South Korea) Kim Ga-eun	21	21
6	(Japan) Ayumi Mine	14	11
Q2	(China) Wang Zhiyi	21	21

Final
3	(South Korea) Kim Ga-eun	18	19
Q2	(China) Wang Zhiyi	21	21

=== Top half ===
==== Section 1 ====
First round
1	(Canada) M Li	21	21
(United States) J Gai	9	10
(United States) C Pan	21	21
(Peru) D Macías	9	14
7	(South Korea) Kim H-m	21	21
Q3	(United States) L Lam	15	19
(United States) I Zhong	17	15
(Canada) B Tam	21	21

Second round
1	(Canada) M Li	21	21
(United States) C Pan	17	12
7	(South Korea) Kim H-m	21	21
(Canada) B Tam	19	9

Quarter-finals
1	(Canada) M Li	22	21
7	(South Korea) Kim H-m	20	18

==== Section 2 ====
First round
3	(South Korea) Kim G-e	21	21
(India) S K P Kudaravalli	11	8
(Germany) F Deprez	21	18	21
(Spain) C Azurmendi	11	21	11
5	(South Korea) An S-y	21	21
(United States) D Gupta	9	8
(Chinese Taipei) Hung Y-t	25	24
(Estonia) K Kuuba	23	22

Second round
3	(South Korea) Kim G-e	21	21
(Germany) F Deprez	16	3
5	(South Korea) An S-y	21	21
(Chinese Taipei) Hung Y-t	10	18

Quarter-finals
3	(South Korea) Kim G-e	21	21
5	(South Korea) An S-y	11	14

=== Bottom half ===
==== Section 3 ====
First round
PFQ	(Australia) Chen H-y	21	16	14
(Chinese Taipei) Chen S-y	17	21	21
(Slovakia) M Repiská	9	8
6	(Japan) A Mine	21	21
(China) Ji ST	21	13	21
(Denmark) J D Jakobsen	13	21	16
(South Korea) Sim Y-j	21	21
4	(China) Zhang YM	17	18

Second round
(Chinese Taipei) Chen S-y	16	22
6	(Japan) A Mine	21	24
(China) Ji ST	13	16
(South Korea) Sim Y-j	21	21

Quarter-finals
6	(Japan) A Mine	12	21	21
(South Korea) Sim Y-j	21	18	11

==== Section 4 ====
First round
(India) A Prabhudesai	17	14
Q1	(Chinese Taipei) Lin H-t	21	21
(Wales) J Hart	7	14
8	(Thailand) P Buranaprasertsuk	21	21
Q4	(Mexico) M Ugalde	10	8
Q2	(China) Wang ZY	21	21
(Chinese Taipei) Chiang Y-l	13	12
2	(Japan) S Kawakami	21	21

Second round
Q1	(Chinese Taipei) Lin H-t	21	21
8	(Thailand) P Buranaprasertsuk	11	9
Q2	(China) Wang ZY	21	21
2	(Japan) S Kawakami	19	14

Quarter-finals
Q1	(Chinese Taipei) Lin H-t	14	12
Q2	(China) Wang ZY	21	21

== Men's doubles ==
=== Seeds ===
1. (Chinese Taipei) Liao Min-chun / Su Ching-heng (second round)
2. (Chinese Taipei) Lee Yang / Wang Chi-lin (final)
3. (Chinese Taipei) Lu Ching-yao / Yang Po-han (quarter-finals)
4. (India) Manu Attri / B. Sumeeth Reddy (withdrew)
5. (Germany) Mark Lamsfuß / Marvin Seidel (first round)
6. (South Korea) Ko Sung-hyun / Shin Baek-cheol (champions)
7. (Malaysia) Mohamad Arif Abdul Latif / Nur Mohd Azriyn Ayub (withdrew)
8. (Canada) Jason Ho-shue / Nyl Yakura (second round)

=== Finals ===
Semi-finals
(Japan) Hiroki Okamura (Japan) Masayuki Onodera	21	20	16
6	(South Korea) Ko Sung-hyun (South Korea) Shin Baek-cheol	19	22	21
(South Korea) Lee Yong-dae (South Korea) Yoo Yeon-seong	21	16	26
2	(Chinese Taipei) Lee Yang (Chinese Taipei) Wang Chi-lin	16	21	28

Final
6	(South Korea) Ko Sung-hyun (South Korea) Shin Baek-cheol	21	17	6
2	(Chinese Taipei) Lee Yang (Chinese Taipei) Wang Chi-lin	13	21	3^{r}

=== Top half ===
==== Section 1 ====
First round
1	(Chinese Taipei) Liao M-c (Chinese Taipei) Su C-h	21	21
Q2	(United States) S Lyu (United States) BH Ye	17	12
(United States) P Chew (United States) R Chew	18	21	17
(Japan) H Okamura (Japan) M Onodera	21	19	21
8	(Canada) J Ho-Shue (Canada) N Yakura	21	21
(Scotland) A Dunn (Scotland) A Hall	11	11
(England) B Lane (England) S Vendy	21	21
PFQ	(Denmark) P Bjerregaard (Denmark) S Rasmussen	14	19

Second round
1	(Chinese Taipei) Liao M-c (Chinese Taipei) Su C-h	21	19	15
(Japan) H Okamura (Japan) M Onodera	18	21	21
8	(Canada) J Ho-Shue (Canada) N Yakura	19	18
(England) B Lane (England) S Vendy	21	21

Quarter-finals
(Japan) H Okamura (Japan) M Onodera	15	21	21
(England) B Lane (England) S Vendy	21	15	16

==== Section 2 ====
First round
3	(Chinese Taipei) Lu C-y (Chinese Taipei) Yang P-ha	21	21
(Germany) J R Jansen (Germany) P Käsbauer	16	19
(Chinese Taipei) Kan C-y (Chinese Taipei) Liao C-h	21	21
(Australia) S Leung (Australia) M Wheller	15	14
6	(South Korea) Ko S-h (South Korea) Shin B-c	19	21	21
(South Korea) Kang M-h (South Korea) Kim J-h	21	14	9
(Netherlands) J Arends (Netherlands) R Jille	18	22	11
(Japan) A Koga (Japan) T Saito	21	20	21

Second round
3	(Chinese Taipei) Lu C-y (Chinese Taipei) Yang P-ha	21	21
(Chinese Taipei) Kan C-y (Chinese Taipei) Liao C-h	10	7
6	(South Korea) Ko S-h (South Korea) Shin B-c	21	15	24
(Japan) A Koga (Japan) T Saito	19	21	22

Quarter-finals
3	(Chinese Taipei) Lu C-y (Chinese Taipei) Yang P-ha	17	23	15
6	(South Korea) Ko S-h (South Korea) Shin B-c	21	21	21

=== Bottom half ===
==== Section 3 ====
First round
Q3	(United States) S Pongnairat (Indonesia) F S Surbakti	6	12
(Chinese Taipei) Lee J-h (Chinese Taipei) Yang P-hs	21	21
(Chinese Taipei) Chang K-c (Chinese Taipei) Lu C-p	12	21	24
5	(Germany) M Lamsfuß (Germany) M Seidel	21	17	22
(China) Liang WK (China) Shang YC	21	12	8
(Denmark) M Boe (Denmark) M Conrad-Petersen	14	21	21
(South Korea) Lee Y-d (South Korea) Yoo Y-s	21	21
PFQ	(Canada) B. R. Sankeerth (India) K Tarun	11	11

Second round
(Chinese Taipei) Lee J-h (Chinese Taipei) Yang P-hs	21	21
(Chinese Taipei) Chang K-c (Chinese Taipei) Lu C-p	16	13
(Denmark) M Boe (Denmark) M Conrad-Petersen	11	23
(South Korea) Lee Y-d (South Korea) Yoo Y-s	21	25

Quarter-finals
(Chinese Taipei) Lee J-h (Chinese Taipei) Yang P-hs	21	19	17
(South Korea) Lee Y-d (South Korea) Yoo Y-s	12	21	21

==== Section 4 ====
First round
(Canada) J Hurlburt-Yu (Canada) D Yao	21	16	18
(Germany) B Geiss (Germany) J C Völker	17	21	21
(Japan) M Kaneko (Japan) Y Kubota	21	21
PFQ	(Dominican Republic) W Cabrera (Dominican Republic) N Javier	13	12
(Thailand) S Jomkoh (Thailand) W Sothon	16	21	19
Q1	(China) Dong WJ (China) Guo XW	21	15	21
(France) T Gicquel (France) R Labar	20	17
2	(Chinese Taipei) Lee Y (Chinese Taipei) Wang C-l	22	21

Second round
(Germany) B Geiss (Germany) J C Völker	19	12
(Japan) M Kaneko (Japan) Y Kubota	21	21
Q1	(China) Dong WJ (China) Guo XW	13	11
2	(Chinese Taipei) Lee Y (Chinese Taipei) Wang C-l	21	21

Quarter-finals
(Japan) M Kaneko (Japan) Y Kubota	13	11
2	(Chinese Taipei) Lee Y (Chinese Taipei) Wang C-l	21	21

== Women's doubles ==
=== Seeds ===
1. (Japan) Nami Matsuyama / Chiharu Shida (champions)
2. (France) Émilie Lefel / Anne Tran (quarter-finals)
3. (Canada) Rachel Honderich / Kristen Tsai (second round)
4. (France) Delphine Delrue / Léa Palermo (second round)
5. (South Korea) Baek Ha-na / Jung Kyung-eun (final)
5. (South Korea) Chang Ye-na / Kim Hye-rin (quarter-finals)
7. (China) Liu Xuanxuan / Xia Yuting (first round)
8. (Chinese Taipei) Hsu Ya-ching / Hu Ling-fang (first round)

=== Finals ===
Semi-finals
1	(Japan) Nami Matsuyama (Japan) Chiharu Shida	19	21	21
(China) Chen Xiaofei (China) Zhang Shuxian	21	15	14
5	(South Korea) Baek Ha-na (South Korea) Jung Kyung-eun	24	21
(Chinese Taipei) Cheng Chi-ya (Chinese Taipei) Lee Chih-chen	22	13

Final
1	(Japan) Nami Matsuyama (Japan) Chiharu Shida	21	21
5	(South Korea) Baek Ha-na (South Korea) Jung Kyung-eun	16	16

=== Top half ===
==== Section 1 ====
First round
1	(Japan) N Matsuyama (Japan) C Shida	23	21
(Japan) S Ozaki (Japan) A Watanabe	21	15
Q1	(China) Gao ZY (China) Peng Q	11	15
(Chinese Taipei) Chang C-h (Chinese Taipei) Yang C-t	21	21
5	(South Korea) Chang Y-n (South Korea) Kim H-r	21	21
PFQ	(United States) B Chi (United States) J Gai	10	9
Q2	(Chinese Taipei) Chiu P-c (Chinese Taipei) Hung Y-t	22	10	12
(Australia) S Mapasa (Australia) G Somerville	20	21	21

Second round
1	(Japan) N Matsuyama (Japan) C Shida	21	21
(Chinese Taipei) Chang C-h (Chinese Taipei) Yang C-t	14	18
5	(South Korea) Chang Y-n (South Korea) Kim H-r	21	21
(Australia) S Mapasa (Australia) G Somerville	17	14

Quarter-finals
1	(Japan) N Matsuyama (Japan) C Shida	21	21
5	(South Korea) Chang Y-n (South Korea) Kim H-r	16	15

==== Section 2 ====
First round
4	(France) D Delrue (France) L Palermo	12	27	21
(China) Chen JY (China) Chen YY	21	25	10
(Denmark) A Bøje (Denmark) M Poulsen	21	21
(United States) A Lee (United States) S Lee	8	9
7	(China) Liu XX (China) Xia YT	23	17	16
(China) Chen XF (China) Zhang SX	21	21	21
(Peru) D Macías (Peru) D Nishimura	7	15
Q4	(China) Chen LZ (China) He XY	21	21

Second round
4	(France) D Delrue (France) L Palermo	20	19
(Denmark) A Bøje (Denmark) M Poulsen	22	21
(China) Chen XF (China) Zhang SX	21	21
Q4	(China) Chen LZ (China) He XY	17	11

Quarter-finals
(Denmark) A Bøje (Denmark) M Poulsen	10	23	11
(China) Chen XF (China) Zhang SX	21	21	21

=== Bottom half ===
==== Section 3 ====
First round
(Japan) A Araki (Japan) R Imai	11	21	21
(Germany) E Janssens (Germany) K Ostermeyer	21	11	16
(Germany) L Efler (Germany) I Herttrich	13	15
5	(South Korea) Baek H-n (South Korea) Jung K-e	21	21
(United States) J Gozali (United States) M Taruno	21	15	21
(United States) E Lee (United States) P L Obañana	13	21	11
Q3	(China) Kang Y (China) Xie ZT	12	23
3	(Canada) R Honderich (Canada) K Tsai	21	25

Second round
(Japan) A Araki (Japan) R Imai	11	12
5	(South Korea) Baek H-n (South Korea) Jung K-e	21	21
(United States) J Gozali (United States) M Taruno	12	15
3	(Canada) R Honderich (Canada) K Tsai	21	8^{r}

Quarter-finals
5	(South Korea) Baek H-n (South Korea) Jung K-e	21	21
(United States) J Gozali (United States) M Taruno	10	7

==== Section 4 ====
First round
(China) Huang J (China) Yu XH	21	11	9
(Chinese Taipei) Li Z-q (Chinese Taipei) Teng C-h	18	21	21
(Chinese Taipei) Cheng C-y (Chinese Taipei) Lee C-c	21	21
8	(Chinese Taipei) Hsu Y-c (Chinese Taipei) Hu L-f	15	14
(Dominican Republic) N A Jiménez (Dominican Republic) B Polanco	9	9
(Scotland) J MacPherson (England) J Moore	21	21
(United States) E Kan (United States) I Zhong	10	13
2	(France) É Lefel (France) A Tran	21	21

Second round
(Chinese Taipei) Li Z-q (Chinese Taipei) Teng C-h	21	20	18
(Chinese Taipei) Cheng C-y (Chinese Taipei) Lee C-c	17	22	21
(Scotland) J MacPherson (England) J Moore	21	19
2	(France) É Lefel (France) A Tran	23	21

Quarter-finals
(Chinese Taipei) Cheng C-y (Chinese Taipei) Lee C-c	15	26	21
2	(France) É Lefel (France) A Tran	21	24	15

== Mixed doubles ==
=== Seeds ===
1. (Germany) Mark Lamsfuß / Isabel Herttrich (second round)
2. (Germany) Marvin Seidel / Linda Efler (quarter-finals)
3. (England) Ben Lane / Jessica Pugh (semi-finals)
4. (France) Thom Gicquel / Delphine Delrue (final)
5. (Denmark) Mathias Christiansen / Alexandra Bøje (first round)
6. (France) Ronan Labar / Anne Tran (second round)
7. (Chinese Taipei) Lu Ching-yao / Lee Chia-hsin (quarter-finals)
8. (Canada) Joshua Hurlburt-Yu / Josephine Wu (first round)

=== Finals ===
Semi-finals
Q1	(Chinese Taipei) Lee Jhe-huei (Chinese Taipei) Hsu Ya-ching	12	24	21
3	(England) Ben Lane (England) Jessica Pugh	21	22	15
4	(France) Thom Gicquel (France) Delphine Delrue	21	21
(Chinese Taipei) Yang Po-hsuan (Chinese Taipei) Hu Ling-fang	17	14

Final
Q1	(Chinese Taipei) Lee Jhe-huei (Chinese Taipei) Hsu Ya-ching	21	21
4	(France) Thom Gicquel (France) Delphine Delrue	17	17

=== Top half ===
==== Section 1 ====
First round
1	(Germany) M Lamsfuß (Germany) I Herttrich	21	21
(United States) M Fogarty (United States) I Zhong	9	7
(South Korea) Ko S-h (South Korea) Eom H-w	21	21
(Germany) J R Jansen (Germany) K Ostermeyer	7	17
6	(France) R Labar (France) A Tran	21	21
Q4	(Australia) M Wheller (Australia) Chen H-s	15	15
Q1	(Chinese Taipei) Lee J-h (Chinese Taipei) Hsu Y-c	21	21
(United States) P Chew (United States) A Lee	13	16

Second round
1	(Germany) M Lamsfuß (Germany) I Herttrich	13	15
(South Korea) Ko S-h (South Korea) Eom H-w	21	21
6	(France) R Labar (France) A Tran	17	9
Q1	(Chinese Taipei) Lee J-h (Chinese Taipei) Hsu Y-c	21	21

Quarter-finals
(South Korea) Ko S-h (South Korea) Eom H-w	13	21	16
Q1	(Chinese Taipei) Lee J-h (Chinese Taipei) Hsu Y-c	21	18	21

==== Section 2 ====
First round
3	(England) B Lane (England) J Pugh	21	21
(United States) R Chew (United States) S Lee	15	15
Q3	(Chinese Taipei) Kan C-y (Canada) R Honderich	21	21
(United States) V Chou (United States) B Chi	13	14
7	(Chinese Taipei) Lu C-y (Chinese Taipei) Lee C-h	21	21
(United States) H Shu (United States) P L Obañana	8	9
(Chinese Taipei) Chang K-c (Chinese Taipei) Chang H-t	20	8
(Scotland) A Hall (Scotland) J MacPherson	22	21

Second round
3	(England) B Lane (England) J Pugh	21	21
Q3	(Chinese Taipei) Kan C-y (Canada) R Honderich	9	12
7	(Chinese Taipei) Lu C-y (Chinese Taipei) Lee C-h	18	21	21
(Scotland) A Hall (Scotland) J MacPherson	21	19	16

Quarter-finals
3	(England) B Lane (England) J Pugh	21	21
7	(Chinese Taipei) Lu C-y (Chinese Taipei) Lee C-h	9	14

=== Bottom half ===
==== Section 3 ====
First round
(Chinese Taipei) Po L-w (Chinese Taipei) Chang C-h	17	18
(Australia) S Leung (Australia) G Somerville	21	21
PFQ	(China) Dong WJ (China) Chen XF	19	21	21
5	(Denmark) M Christiansen (Denmark) A Bøje	21	19	17
PFQ	(United States) P Jap (United States) E Lee	12	11
Q2	(Chinese Taipei) Lu C-p (Chinese Taipei) Lee C-c	21	21
(Chinese Taipei) Wang C-l (Chinese Taipei) Cheng C-y	20	19
4	(France) T Gicquel (France) D Delrue	22	21

Second round
(Australia) S Leung (Australia) G Somerville	18	11
PFQ	(China) Dong WJ (China) Chen XF	21	21
Q2	(Chinese Taipei) Lu C-p (Chinese Taipei) Lee C-c	18	21	13
4	(France) T Gicquel (France) D Delrue	21	15	21

Quarter-finals
PFQ	(China) Dong WJ (China) Chen XF	16	24
4	(France) T Gicquel (France) D Delrue	21	26

==== Section 4 ====
First round
(Thailand) S Jomkoh (Thailand) S Paewsampran	21	21
(Dominican Republic) C A B González (Dominican Republic) B Polanco	14	12
(Chinese Taipei) Yang P-hs (Chinese Taipei) Hu L-f	18	21	21
8	(Canada) J Hurlburt-Yu (Canada) J Wu	21	18	10
(Chinese Taipei) Lee Y (Chinese Taipei) Yang C-t	21	21
(England) C Hemming (England) J Moore	12	16
(United States) S Pongnairat (United States) J Gozali	10	21	16
2	(Germany) M Seidel (Germany) L Efler	21	18	21

Second round
(Thailand) S Jomkoh (Thailand) S Paewsampran	11	16
(Chinese Taipei) Yang P-hs (Chinese Taipei) Hu L-f	21	21
(Chinese Taipei) Lee Y (Chinese Taipei) Yang C-t	21	16	17
2	(Germany) M Seidel (Germany) L Efler	19	21	21

Quarter-finals
(Chinese Taipei) Yang P-hs (Chinese Taipei) Hu L-f	19	21	21
2	(Germany) M Seidel (Germany) L Efler	21	10	15

Preceded by 2019 Canada Open	BWF World Tour; 2019 BWF season	Succeeded by 2019 Russian Open
