= Nami Matsuyama =

Japanese badminton player

Personal information
- Born: 28 June 1998 (age 28) Kitakyushu, Fukuoka, Japan
- Height: 1.66 m (5 ft 5 in)

Sport
- Country: Japan
- Sport: Badminton
- Handedness: Right

Women's & mixed doubles
- Highest ranking: 2 (WD with Chiharu Shida, 8 November 2022); 77 (XD with Hiroki Midorikawa, 12 May 2026)
- Current ranking: 87 (XD with Hiroki Midorikawa, 27 October 2026)
- BWF profile
Medal record
Women's badminton
Representing Japan
Olympic Games
Bronze medal – third place	2024 Paris	Women's doubles
World Championships
Bronze medal – third place	2025 Paris	Women's doubles
Sudirman Cup
Silver medal – second place	2021 Vantaa	Mixed team
Bronze medal – third place	2023 Suzhou	Mixed team
Bronze medal – third place	2025 Xiamen	Mixed team
Uber Cup
Silver medal – second place	2020 Aarhus	Women's team
Bronze medal – third place	2022 Bangkok	Women's team
Bronze medal – third place	2024 Chengdu	Women's team
Asian Championships
Silver medal – second place	2025 Ningbo	Women's doubles
Asian Games
Bronze medal – third place	2022 Hangzhou	Women's team
Asia Team Championships
Gold medal – first place	2020 Manila	Women's team
Bronze medal – third place	2024 Selangor	Women's team
World Junior Championships
Gold medal – first place	2016 Bilbao	Girls' doubles
Bronze medal – third place	2015 Lima	Girls' doubles
Bronze medal – third place	2016 Bilbao	Mixed team
Asian Junior Championships
Bronze medal – third place	2015 Bangkok	Girls' doubles
Bronze medal – third place	2015 Bangkok	Mixed team
Bronze medal – third place	2016 Bangkok	Mixed team

Nami Matsuyama (松山 奈未, Matsuyama Nami; born 28 June 1998) is a Japanese badminton player affiliated with the Saishunkan team. She is the Women's Doubles bronze medalist at the 2024 Summer Olympics. Matsuyama helps the national team won the 2020 Asia Team Championships. She reached a career high as world number 2 in the BWF World rankings on 8 November 2022 with Chiharu Shida.

Matsuyama is the girls' doubles gold medalist at the 2016 World Junior Championships in Bilbao, Spain partnered with Sayaka Hobara. Matsuyama won her first senior international title in Thailand at the 2017 Smiling Fish International tournament with Chiharu Shida.

== Career ==
=== 2018–2020: Chinese Taipei Open–first World Tour title ===
Matsuyama began the 2018 season as a semi-finalist at the Swiss Open alongside partner Chiharu Shida. The pair reached their first BWF World Tour final at the Singapore Open, where they lost to teammates Ayako Sakuramoto and Yukiko Takahata. They also finished as runners-up to Sakuramoto and Takahata at the Akita Masters and the Bangka Belitung Indonesia Masters, while in the Vietnam Open they lose to Misato Aratama and Akane Watanabe. Matsuyama and Shida secured their first World Tour title at the Chinese Taipei Open by defeating Ayane Kurihara and Naru Shinoya. They ended the season ranked as world number 13.

In 2019, Matsuyama and Shida won two titles at the U.S. Open and Korea Masters. They were also finalists at the Spain Masters and Swiss Open. During the 2020 season, Matsuyama was selected for the Japanese squad at the Asia Women's Team Championships, helping the team win gold against South Korea. On the World Tour, Matsuyama and Shida’s best result was a semi-final appearance at the Malaysia Masters.

=== 2021: Two titles at the Indonesia Badminton Festival ===
Following tournament disruptions caused by the COVID-19 pandemic, Matsuyama was selected for the Japanese squad at the Sudirman in Finland and Uber Cup in Denmark. She helped the team secure silver medals in both competitions. Partnering with Shida, she claimed back-to-back titles at the Indonesia Masters and Indonesia Open. The pair reached the final of the season-ending BWF World Tour Finals in Bali, finishing as runners-up. Matsuyama and Shida concluded the year by making their debut at the World Championships in Huelva, reaching the quarter-finals. Following these results, the pair entered the top 10 in the BWF world ranking.

=== 2022–2023: All England Open title, and world #2 ===
Started the 2022 season as world number 7, Matsuyama and Shida won the All England Open title beating Zhang Shuxian and Zheng Yu in the final. They competed in the Asian Championships, but were eliminated in the quarter-finals to Chen Qingchen and Jia Yifan. The pair won their second title of the year in the Thailand Open by defeating Mayu Matsumoto and Wakana Nagahara in the final. Their good performance continue in the Indonesia Open triumph over Yuki Fukushima and Sayaka Hirota. They also made a history as the first ever women's doubles to win three consecutive BWF World Tour Super 1000 event. The duo then reached the finals in the Malaysia Masters, but have not been able to beat the world number 1 women's doubles pairing Chen and Jia. They qualified to compete in the World Championships, but their pace were stopped in the quarter-finals to Kim So-yeong and Kong Hee-yong. Matsuyama and Shida reached their career high as world number 2 in the BWF world ranking in November 2022.

In early 2023, Matsuyama and Shida won the India Open via walkover after Chen and Jia withdrew due to Chen's illness. Matsuyama and Shida then suffered five consecutive defeats from the South Korean new pairing Baek Ha-na and Lee So-hee; in the finals of the German Open, quarter-finals of the Malaysia Masters and Singapore Open, second round of the All England Open, and also in the first round of the Asian Championships. They then finally topped the podium at the Canada Open after won the final against Matsumoto and Nagahara. Chen and Jia are still too tough for Matsuyama and Shida. They have lost all of five meetings in the second half of the season; in the quarter-finals of the Japan Open, World Championships, and Asian Games; semi-finals of the China Open; and then in the final of the Denmark Open. The duo then won their third title of the year in the China Masters. Matsuyama and Shida qualified to compete in the year-end finals tournament, the BWF World Tour Finals, reaching to the semi-finals, where they were defeated again by Baek and Lee.

=== 2024–2025: Olympic bronze, second All England title ===
In early 2024, Matsuyama and Shida reached the finals of the French and Singapore Opens but were defeated in both by Chen and Jia. At the All England Open, they lost in the finals to Baek and Lee in three games. The pair qualified for the 2024 Summer Olympics, where they won the bronze medal. Later that year, they were nominated as women's doubles player of the year by the Badminton World Federation. They concluded the 2024 season as runners-up at the World Tour Finals, losing to Baek and Lee.

In 2025, Matsuyama won her second All England Open title with Shida, defeating the newly formed pair of Yuki Fukushima and Mayu Matsumoto. They also reached the final of the Asian Championships, securing the silver medal. On 8 July, Matsuyama and Shida announced they would end their partnership following the 2025 BWF World Championships.

=== 2026: Transition to mixed doubles and injury ===
Matsuyama transitioned to mixed doubles, partnering with Hiroki Midorikawa. The pair won the 2026 Polish Open by defeating Jeppe Søby and Sofie Røjkjær. In late March, Matsuyama and Midorikawa advanced to the final of the Vietnam International but were forced to retire when Matsuyama sustained a left knee injury. On 6 April, her club, Saishunkan Pharmaceutical, announced she had torn both her left anterior cruciate ligament (ACL) and medial collateral ligament (MCL), requiring surgery and rehabilitation.

== Awards and nominations ==
Award	Year	Category	Result	Ref.
BWF Awards	2024	Women’s Doubles Player of the Year with Chiharu Shida	Nominated	

== Achievements ==
=== Olympic Games ===
Women's doubles
Year	Venue	Partner	Opponent	Score	Result	Ref.
2024	Porte de La Chapelle Arena, Paris, France	(Japan) Chiharu Shida	(Malaysia) Pearly Tan (Malaysia) Thinaah Muralitharan	21–11, 21–11	Bronze	

=== World Championships ===
Women's doubles
Year	Venue	Partner	Opponent	Score	Result	Ref.
2025	Adidas Arena, Paris, France	(Japan) Chiharu Shida	(Malaysia) Pearly Tan (Malaysia) Thinaah Muralitharan	21–14, 13–21, 12–21	Bronze	

=== Asian Championships ===
Women's doubles
Year	Venue	Partner	Opponent	Score	Result	Ref.
2025	Ningbo Olympic Sports Center Gymnasium, Ningbo, China	(Japan) Chiharu Shida	(China) Liu Shengshu (China) Tan Ning	15–21, 19–21	Silver	

=== World Junior Championships ===
Girls' doubles
Year	Venue	Partner	Opponent	Score	Result	Ref.
2015	Centro de Alto Rendimiento de la Videna, Lima, Peru	(Japan) Chiharu Shida	(China) Du Yue (China) Li Yinhui	17–21, 21–14, 12–21	Bronze	
2016	Bilbao Arena, Bilbao, Spain	(Japan) Sayaka Hobara	(China) Du Yue (China) Xu Ya	25–23, 19–21, 21–14	Gold	

=== Asian Junior Championships ===
Girls' doubles
Year	Venue	Partner	Opponent	Score	Result	Ref.
2015	CPB Badminton Training Center, Bangkok, Thailand	(Japan) Chiharu Shida	(China) Chen Qingchen (China) Jia Yifan	11–21, 16–21	Bronze	

=== BWF World Tour (12 titles, 14 runners-up) ===
The BWF World Tour, which was announced on 19 March 2017 and implemented in 2018, is a series of elite badminton tournaments sanctioned by the Badminton World Federation (BWF). The BWF World Tour is divided into levels of World Tour Finals, Super 1000, Super 750, Super 500, Super 300, and the BWF Tour Super 100.

Women's doubles
Year	Tournament	Level	Partner	Opponent	Score	Result	Ref.
2018	Singapore Open	Super 500	(Japan) Chiharu Shida	(Japan) Ayako Sakuramoto (Japan) Yukiko Takahata	21–16, 22–24, 13–21	(silver) Runner-up	
2018	Akita Masters	Super 100	(Japan) Chiharu Shida	(Japan) Ayako Sakuramoto (Japan) Yukiko Takahata	21–23, 11–21	(silver) Runner-up	
2018	Vietnam Open	Super 100	(Japan) Chiharu Shida	(Japan) Misato Aratama (Japan) Akane Watanabe	18–21, 19–21	(silver) Runner-up	
2018	Indonesia Masters	Super 100	(Japan) Chiharu Shida	(Japan) Ayako Sakuramoto (Japan) Yukiko Takahata	21–11, 19–21, 20–22	(silver) Runner-up	
2018	Chinese Taipei Open	Super 300	(Japan) Chiharu Shida	(Japan) Ayane Kurihara (Japan) Naru Shinoya	21–10, 21–17	(gold) Winner	
2019	Spain Masters	Super 300	(Japan) Chiharu Shida	(South Korea) Kim So-yeong (South Korea) Kong Hee-yong	21–23, 21–15, 17–21	(silver) Runner-up	
2019	Swiss Open	Super 300	(Japan) Chiharu Shida	(South Korea) Chang Ye-na (South Korea) Jung Kyung-eun	16–21, 13–21	(silver) Runner-up	
2019	U.S. Open	Super 300	(Japan) Chiharu Shida	(South Korea) Baek Ha-na (South Korea) Jung Kyung-eun	21–16, 21–16	(gold) Winner	
2019	Korea Masters	Super 300	(Japan) Chiharu Shida	(Japan) Misaki Matsutomo (Japan) Ayaka Takahashi	15–21, 21–17, 21–18	(gold) Winner	
2021	Indonesia Masters	Super 750	(Japan) Chiharu Shida	(South Korea) Jeong Na-eun (South Korea) Kim Hye-jeong	21–9, 21–11	(gold) Winner	
2021	Indonesia Open	Super 1000	(Japan) Chiharu Shida	(Indonesia) Greysia Polii (Indonesia) Apriyani Rahayu	21–19, 21–19	(gold) Winner	
2021	BWF World Tour Finals	World Tour Finals	(Japan) Chiharu Shida	(South Korea) Kim So-yeong (South Korea) Kong Hee-yong	14–21, 14–21	(silver) Runner-up	
2022	All England Open	Super 1000	(Japan) Chiharu Shida	(China) Zhang Shuxian (China) Zheng Yu	21–13, 21–9	(gold) Winner	
2022	Thailand Open	Super 500	(Japan) Chiharu Shida	(Japan) Mayu Matsumoto (Japan) Wakana Nagahara	17–21, 21–15, 26–24	(gold) Winner	
2022	Indonesia Open	Super 1000	(Japan) Chiharu Shida	(Japan) Yuki Fukushima (Japan) Sayaka Hirota	18–21, 21–14, 21–17	(gold) Winner	
2022	Malaysia Masters	Super 500	(Japan) Chiharu Shida	(China) Chen Qingchen (China) Jia Yifan	11–21, 12–21	(silver) Runner-up	
2023	India Open	Super 750	(Japan) Chiharu Shida	(China) Chen Qingchen (China) Jia Yifan	Walkover	(gold) Winner	
2023	German Open	Super 300	(Japan) Chiharu Shida	(South Korea) Baek Ha-na (South Korea) Lee So-hee	19–21, 15–21	(silver) Runner-up	
2023	Canada Open	Super 500	(Japan) Chiharu Shida	(Japan) Mayu Matsumoto (Japan) Wakana Nagahara	22–20, 21–16	(gold) Winner	
2023	Denmark Open	Super 750	(Japan) Chiharu Shida	(China) Chen Qingchen (China) Jia Yifan	16–21, 13–21	(silver) Runner-up	
2023	China Masters	Super 750	(Japan) Chiharu Shida	(Japan) Yuki Fukushima (Japan) Sayaka Hirota	21–18, 21–11	(gold) Winner	
2024	French Open	Super 750	(Japan) Chiharu Shida	(China) Chen Qingchen (China) Jia Yifan	12–21, 21–19, 22–24	(silver) Runner-up	
2024	All England Open	Super 1000	(Japan) Chiharu Shida	(South Korea) Baek Ha-na (South Korea) Lee So-hee	19–21, 21–11, 17–21	(silver) Runner-up	
2024	Singapore Open	Super 750	(Japan) Chiharu Shida	(China) Chen Qingchen (China) Jia Yifan	15–21, 12–21	(silver) Runner-up	
2024	BWF World Tour Finals	World Tour Finals	(Japan) Chiharu Shida	(South Korea) Baek Ha-na (South Korea) Lee So-hee	19–21, 14–21	(silver) Runner-up	
2025	All England Open	Super 1000	(Japan) Chiharu Shida	(Japan) Yuki Fukushima (Japan) Mayu Matsumoto	21–16, 14–21, 21–17	(gold) Winner	

=== BWF International Challenge/Series (2 titles, 1 runner-up) ===
Women's doubles
Year	Tournament	Partner	Opponent	Score	Result	Ref.
2017	Smiling Fish International	(Japan) Chiharu Shida	(Japan) Chisato Hoshi (Japan) Naru Shinoya	21–19, 21–14	(gold) Winner	

Mixed doubles
Year	Tournament	Partner	Opponent	Score	Result	Ref.
2026	Polish Open	(Japan) Hiroki Midorikawa	(Denmark) Jeppe Søby (Denmark) Sofie Røjkjær	21–11, 21–13	(gold) Winner	
2026	Vietnam International	(Japan) Hiroki Midorikawa	(Hong Kong) Chan Yin Chak (Hong Kong) Ng Tsz Yau	17–14 retired	(silver) Runner-up	

BWF International Challenge tournament
