= Kilasu Ostermeyer =

Thai-German badminton player (born 1997)

Personal information
- Born: กิลาซู โอสเตอร์ไมเยอร์ 5 March 1997 (age 29) Pathum Thani, Thailand
- Years active: 2012

Sport
- Country: Thailand; Germany (2016–)
- Sport: Badminton
- Handedness: Right

Women's & mixed doubles
- Highest ranking: 53 (WD with Muenwong 24 July 2014); 46 (XD with Jansen 9 March 2021)
- Current ranking: 90 (WD with Eva Janssens); 50 (XD with Jansen) (10 August 2021)
- BWF profile
Medal record
Women's badminton
Representing Thailand
World Junior Championships
Bronze medal – third place	2014 Alor Setar	Mixed team
Representing Germany
European Mixed Team Championships
Silver medal – second place	2019 Copenhagen	Mixed team
Bronze medal – third place	2021 Vantaa	Mixed team
European Women's Team Championships
Bronze medal – third place	2020 Liévin	Women's team

Kilasu Ostermeyer (born 5 March 1997) is a Thailand-born German badminton player who entered the Thailand national team in 2012, and transferred to Germany national team in 2016.

== Achievements ==
=== BWF International Challenge/Series (1 title) ===
Women's doubles

Year	Tournament	Partner	Opponent	Score	Result
2014	Sri Lanka International	(Thailand) Phataimas Muenwong	(India) Pradnya Gadre (India) N. Sikki Reddy	21–14, 21–17	(gold) Winner

BWF International Challenge tournament
BWF International Series tournament
