= 2018 Singapore Open (badminton) =

2018 badminton tournament

Tournament details
- Dates: 17–22 July
- Edition: 69th
- Level: Super 500
- Total prize money: US$355,000
- Venue: Singapore Indoor Stadium
- Location: Kallang, Singapore

Champions
- Men's singles: (Chinese Taipei) Chou Tien-chen
- Women's singles: (Japan) Sayaka Takahashi
- Men's doubles: (Indonesia) Mohammad Ahsan (Indonesia) Hendra Setiawan
- Women's doubles: (Japan) Ayako Sakuramoto (Japan) Yukiko Takahata
- Mixed doubles: (Malaysia) Goh Soon Huat (Malaysia) Shevon Jemie Lai

The 2018 Singapore Open (officially known as the Singapore Badminton Open 2018) was a badminton tournament which took place at the Singapore Indoor Stadium in Singapore from 17 to 22 July 2018 and had a total purse of $355,000.

== Tournament ==
The 2018 Singapore Open was the fourteenth tournament of the 2018 BWF World Tour and also part of the Singapore Open championships, which had been held since 1929. This tournament was organized by the Singapore Badminton Association with the sanction from BWF.

=== Venue ===
This international tournament was held at Singapore Indoor Stadium in Singapore.

=== Point distribution ===
Below is the point distribution table for each phase of the tournament based on the BWF points system for the BWF World Tour Super 500 event.

Winner	Runner-up	3/4	5/8	9/16	17/32	33/64	65/128
9,200	7,800	6,420	5,040	3,600	2,220	880	430

=== Prize money ===
The total prize money for this tournament was US$355,000. Distribution of prize money was in accordance with BWF regulations.

Event	Winner	Finals	Semi-finals	Quarter-finals	Last 16
Singles	$26,625	$13,490	$5,147.50	$2,130	$1,242.50
Doubles	$28,045	$13,490	$4,970	$2,573.75	$1,331.25

== Men's singles ==
=== Seeds ===
1. (Chinese Taipei) Chou Tien-chen (champion)
2. (Hong Kong) Ng Ka Long (second round)
3. (Hong Kong) Wong Wing Ki (first round)
4. (India) Sameer Verma (withdrew)
5. (Thailand) Khosit Phetpradab (second round)
6. (India) B. Sai Praneeth (first round)
7. (Indonesia) Tommy Sugiarto (withdrew)
8. (South Korea) Lee Hyun-il (quarter-finals)

=== Finals ===
Semi-finals
1	(Chinese Taipei) Chou Tien-chen	21	18	21
(China) Qiao Bin	12	21	16
(Vietnam) Nguyễn Tiến Minh	15	11
(Chinese Taipei) Hsu Jen-hao	21	21

Final
1	(Chinese Taipei) Chou Tien-chen	21	21
(Chinese Taipei) Hsu Jen-hao	13	13

=== Top half ===
==== Section 1 ====
First Round
1	(Chinese Taipei) Chou T-c	21	21
Q3	(Indonesia) S D Kuncoro	13	13
(India) S Dey	14	21	21
(Canada) J Ho-shue	21	14	16
8	(South Korea) Lee H-i	21	21	21
(Malaysia) Lee Z J	23	13	9
Q4	(Singapore) Loh K Y	21	21
(France) L Corvée	15	16

Second Round
1	(Chinese Taipei) Chou T-c	21	21
(India) S Dey	13	14
8	(South Korea) Lee H-i	21	21
Q4	(Singapore) Loh K Y	16	13

Quarter-finals
1	(Chinese Taipei) Chou T-c	21	21
8	(South Korea) Lee H-i	18	6

==== Section 2 ====
First Round
PFQ	(Thailand) P Thongnuam	21	21
(Thailand) K Wangcharoen	14	13
(Thailand) S Avihingsanon	16	21	20
(Malaysia) Chong W F	21	12	22
6	(India) B. S Praneeth	21	16	18
(Japan) Y Igarashi	16	21	21
(China) Qiao B	21	21
Q2	(India) R. M. V. Gurusaidutt	14	19

Second Round
PFQ	(Thailand) P Thongnuam	11	16
(Malaysia) Chong W F	21	21
(Japan) Y Igarashi	14	14
(China) Qiao B	21	21

Quarter-finals
(Malaysia) Chong W F	14	18
(China) Qiao B	21	21

=== Bottom half ===
==== Section 3 ====
First Round
(Thailand) T Saensomboonsuk	9	21	9
(Vietnam) Nguyễn T M	21	14	21
(India) K Parupalli	9	6
PFQ	(India) S Verma	21	21
Q1	(Indonesia) F A Kholik	21	15	8
(Indonesia) I M Mustofa	15	21	21
(Malaysia) Liew D	21	21
3	(Hong Kong) Wong W K	14	16

Second Round
(Vietnam) Nguyễn T M	18	21	21
PFQ	(India) S Verma	21	15	11
(Indonesia) I M Mustofa	23	21
(Malaysia) Liew D	21	16

Quarter-finals
(Vietnam) Nguyễn T M	21	21
(Indonesia) I M Mustofa	15	15

==== Section 4 ====
First Round
(Chinese Taipei) Hsu J-h	17	21	21
(Spain) P Abián	21	10	17
(Hong Kong) Lee C Y	21	15	13
5	(Thailand) K Phetpradab	11	21	21
(Hong Kong) Hu Y	14	21	17
(China) Huang YX	21	13	21
(England) T Penty	21	14	14
2	(Hong Kong) Ng K L	17	21	21

Second Round
(Chinese Taipei) Hsu J-h	21	21
5	(Thailand) K Phetpradab	17	18
(China) Huang YX	21	21	21
2	(Hong Kong) Ng K L	15	23	17

Quarter-finals
(Chinese Taipei) Hsu J-h	21	6	21
(China) Huang YX	15	21	16

== Women's singles ==
=== Seeds ===
1. (Thailand) Ratchanok Intanon (withdrew)
2. (Thailand) Nitchaon Jindapol (semi-finals)
3. (United States) Zhang Beiwen (first round)
4. (Canada) Michelle Li (second round)
5. (Japan) Sayaka Takahashi (champion)
6. (Hong Kong) Cheung Ngan Yi (withdrew)
7. (China) Gao Fangjie (final)
8. (Thailand) Pornpawee Chochuwong (second round)

=== Finals ===
Semi-finals
(China) Han Yue	18	14
5	(Japan) Sayaka Takahashi	21	21
7	(China) Gao Fangjie	21	12	21
2	(Thailand) Nitchaon Jindapol	15	21	14

Final
5	(Japan) Sayaka Takahashi	25	21
7	(China) Gao Fangjie	23	14

=== Top half ===
==== Section 1 ====
First Round
PFQ	(Indonesia) Y Y Susanto	20	21	21
Q4	(United States) J Gai	22	15	15
Q3	(India) R Das	5
(Switzerland) S Jaquet	3^{r}
8	(Thailand) P Chochuwong	21	21
(Hong Kong) Yip P Y	12	17
(China) Han Y	21	21
(Chinese Taipei) Chiang Y-l	19	14

Second Round
PFQ	(Indonesia) Y Y Susanto	15	21	21
Q3	(India) R Das	21	13	16
8	(Thailand) P Chochuwong	14	21	19
(China) Han Y	21	15	21

Quarter-finals
PFQ	(Indonesia) Y Y Susanto	11	21	14
(China) Han Y	21	19	21

==== Section 2 ====
First Round
4	(Canada) M Li	19	22	21
(Indonesia) L A Mainaky	21	20	17
(Japan) M Mitani	21	21
(India) V R Jakka	19	7
5	(Japan) S Takahashi	21	21
(Vietnam) Vũ T T	11	16
(India) R S Gadde	21	17	21
(Bulgaria) L Zetchiri	15	21	16

Second Round
4	(Canada) M Li	14	14
(Japan) M Mitani	21	21
5	(Japan) S Takahashi	21	21
(India) R S Gadde	8	15

Quarter-finals
(Japan) M Mitani	21	13	12
5	(Japan) S Takahashi	12	21	21

=== Bottom half ===
==== Section 3 ====
First Round
PFQ	(Indonesia) R Hartawan	11	16
(Thailand) B Ongbamrungphan	21	21
(India) M Agrey	12	16
7	(China) Gao FJ	21	21
Q1	(Singapore) Yeo J M	21	24
Q2	(Thailand) P Buranaprasertsuk	12	22
(China) Cai YY	15	21	21
3	(United States) Zhang BW	21	11	16

Second Round
(Thailand) B Ongbamrungphan	14	15
7	(China) Gao FJ	21	21
Q1	(Singapore) Yeo J M	14	16
(China) Cai YY	21	21

Quarter-finals
7	(China) Gao FJ	16	21	24
(China) Cai YY	21	16	22

==== Section 4 ====
First Round
(Germany) F Deprez	19	7
(Chinese Taipei) Chen S-y	21	21
(Spain) B Corrales	21	21	21
PFQ	(India) S U R Chukka	23	4	6
(China) Zhang YM	15	20
(England) C Birch	21	22
PFQ	(India) V Choudhari	10	6
2	(Thailand) N Jindapol	21	21

Second Round
(Chinese Taipei) Chen S-y	20	21	22
(Spain) B Corrales	22	12	20
(England) C Birch	13	16
2	(Thailand) N Jindapol	21	21

Quarter-finals
(Chinese Taipei) Chen S-y	23	16
2	(Thailand) N Jindapol	25	21

== Men's doubles ==
=== Seeds ===
1. (Chinese Taipei) Liao Min-chun / Su Ching-heng (first round)
2. (India) Satwiksairaj Rankireddy / Chirag Shetty (second round)
3. (Thailand) Tinn Isriyanet / Kittisak Namdash (quarter-finals)
4. (Germany) Mark Lamsfuß / Marvin Emil Seidel (first round)
5. (Indonesia) Mohammad Ahsan / Hendra Setiawan (champions)
6. (Canada) Jason Ho-shue / Nyl Yakura (first round)
7. (India) Arjun M.R. / Ramchandran Shlok (first round)
8. (China) Chai Biao / Wang Zekang (withdrew)

=== Finals ===
Semi-finals
(Indonesia) Angga Pratama (Indonesia) Rian Agung Saputro	16	13
5	(Indonesia) Mohammad Ahsan (Indonesia) Hendra Setiawan	21	21
(China) Han Chengkai (China) Zhou Haodong	17	24
(China) Ou Xuanyi (China) Ren Xiangyu	21	26

Final
5	(Indonesia) Mohammad Ahsan (Indonesia) Hendra Setiawan	21	21
(China) Ou Xuanyi (China) Ren Xiangyu	13	19

=== Top half ===
==== Section 1 ====
First Round
1	(Chinese Taipei) Liao M-c (Chinese Taipei) Su C-h	19	21	17
(Hong Kong) Lee C H (Hong Kong) Or C C	21	16	21
(United States) P Chew (United States) R Chew	19	14
(Thailand) B Isara (Thailand) M Jongjit	21	21
PFQ	(India) M A Raju (India) V G Prasad	16	16
(Malaysia) A Chia (Malaysia) Soh W Y	21	21
(Indonesia) A Pratama (Indonesia) R A Saputro	21	21
(Thailand) I Apisuk (Thailand) T Viriyangkura	16	15

Second Round
(Hong Kong) Lee C H (Hong Kong) Or C C	15	14
(Thailand) B Isara (Thailand) M Jongjit	21	21
(Malaysia) A Chia (Malaysia) Soh W Y	19	21	20
(Indonesia) A Pratama (Indonesia) R A Saputro	21	18	22

Quarter-finals
(Thailand) B Isara (Thailand) M Jongjit
(Indonesia) A Pratama (Indonesia) R A Saputro	w	/	o

==== Section 2 ====
First Round
3	(Thailand) T Isriyanet (Thailand) K Namdash	21	21
Q2	(Hong Kong) Ho W L (Hong Kong) Mak H C	12	15
PFQ	(Singapore) D B Chrisnanta (Singapore) T Hee Y K	21	22
Q1	(Indonesia) A Ramadiansyah (Indonesia) R Rivaldy	19	20
5	(Indonesia) M Ahsan (Indonesia) H Setiawan	21	21
Q4	(Italy) F Caponio (Italy) G Toti	13	14
(Thailand) P Kuna-Anuvit (Thailand) N Trinkajee	19	16
(England) P Briggs (England) T Wolfenden	21	21

Second Round
3	(Thailand) T Isriyanet (Thailand) K Namdash	21	21
PFQ	(Singapore) D B Chrisnanta (Singapore) T Hee Y K	18	18
5	(Indonesia) M Ahsan (Indonesia) H Setiawan	21	21
(England) P Briggs (England) T Wolfenden	18	9

Quarter-finals
3	(Thailand) T Isriyanet (Thailand) K Namdash	19	19
5	(Indonesia) M Ahsan (Indonesia) H Setiawan	21	21

=== Bottom half ===
==== Section 3 ====
First Round
(China) Han CK (China) Zhou HD	21	21
(France) T Gicquel (France) B Kersaudy	10	15
(England) B Lane (England) S Vendy	19	21	21
7	(India) Arjun M.R. (India) R Shlok	21	17	19
(Chinese Taipei) Po L-w (Chinese Taipei) Yang M-t	16	21	22
(India) A George (India) S Shukla	21	17	20
(Hong Kong) Chung Y (Hong Kong) Tam C H	9	21	22
4	(Germany) M Lamsfuß (Germany) M E Seidel	21	17	20

Second Round
(China) Han CK (China) Zhou HD	21	21
(England) B Lane (England) S Vendy	14	12
(Chinese Taipei) Po L-w (Chinese Taipei) Yang M-t	21	21
(Hong Kong) Chung Y (Hong Kong) Tam C H	18	15

Quarter-finals
(China) Han CK (China) Zhou HD	21	21
(Chinese Taipei) Po L-w (Chinese Taipei) Yang M-t	15	11

==== Section 4 ====
First Round
(Malaysia) Goh S F (Malaysia) Tan W G	21	21
(Indonesia) A B Cahyono (Indonesia) M R P Isfahani	13	14
PFQ	(Malaysia) M A L Arif (Malaysia) N M A Azriyn	21	21
6	(Canada) J Ho-shue (Canada) N Yakura	12	19
(China) Ou XY (China) Ren XY	21	21
(Thailand) N Phuangphuapet (Thailand) N Yordphaisong	15	15
Q3	(Singapore) R Hidayat (Singapore) Loh K H	16	22
2	(India) S Rankireddy (India) C Shetty	21	24

Second Round
(Malaysia) Goh S F (Malaysia) Tan W G	11	8
PFQ	(Malaysia) M A L Arif (Malaysia) N M A Azriyn	21	21
(China) Ou XY (China) Ren XY	21	21
2	(India) S Rankireddy (India) C Shetty	17	18

Quarter-finals
PFQ	(Malaysia) M A L Arif (Malaysia) N M A Azriyn	21	16	15
(China) Ou XY (China) Ren XY	9	21	21

== Women's doubles ==
=== Seeds ===
1. (Thailand) Jongkolphan Kititharakul / Rawinda Prajongjai (semi-finals)
2. (Indonesia) Della Destiara Haris / Rizki Amelia Pradipta (first round)
3. (Japan) Naoko Fukuman / Kurumi Yonao (second round)
4. (Thailand) Chayanit Chaladchalam / Phataimas Muenwong (quarter-finals)
5. (Japan) Ayako Sakuramoto / Yukiko Takahata (champions)
6. (China) Tang Jinhua / Yu Xiaohan (quarter-finals)
7. (France) Émilie Lefel / Anne Tran (first round)
8. (India) Ashwini Ponnappa / N. Sikki Reddy (first round)

=== Finals ===
Semi-finals
1	(Thailand) Jongkolphan Kititharakul (Thailand) Rawinda Prajongjai	17	19
5	(Japan) Ayako Sakuramoto (Japan) Yukiko Takahata	21	21
(Japan) Nami Matsuyama (Japan) Chiharu Shida	21	17	21
(Germany) Isabel Herttrich (Germany) Carla Nelte	18	21	16

Final
5	(Japan) Ayako Sakuramoto (Japan) Yukiko Takahata	16	24	21
(Japan) Nami Matsuyama (Japan) Chiharu Shida	21	22	13

=== Top half ===
==== Section 1 ====
First Round
1	(Thailand) J Kititharakul (Thailand) R Prajongjai	21	21
(Italy) S Garino (Italy) L Iversen	10	11
(England) C Birch (England) J Moore	13	21	21
(Hong Kong) Ng W Y (Hong Kong) Yeung N T	21	17	16
6	(China) Tang JH (China) Yu XH	21	21
(United States) A Lee (United States) S Lee	3	2
(Singapore) Citra P S D (Singapore) Jin YJ	27	14	22
(France) D Delrue (France) L Palermo	25	21	20

Second Round
1	(Thailand) J Kititharakul (Thailand) R Prajongjai	22	21
(England) C Birch (England) J Moore	20	16
6	(China) Tang JH (China) Yu XH	21	21
(Singapore) Citra P S D (Singapore) Jin YJ	13	7

Quarter-finals
1	(Thailand) J Kititharakul (Thailand) R Prajongjai	21	26
6	(China) Tang JH (China) Yu XH	19	24

==== Section 2 ====
First Round
4	(Thailand) C Chaladchalam (Thailand) P Muenwong	21	18
Q4	(Indonesia) C S Ayunidha (Indonesia) E Narulia	7	5^{r}
PFQ	(Malaysia) Goh Y C (Malaysia) V Hoo K M	21	21
Q1	(Singapore) Lim M H (Singapore) Yao L	16	19
5	(Japan) A Sakuramoto (Japan) Y Takahata	w	/	o
Q3
PFQ	(Indonesia) M C Bandaso (Indonesia) W O Kandow	15	10
(Japan) M Aratama (Japan) A Watanabe	21	21

Second Round
4	(Thailand) C Chaladchalam (Thailand) P Muenwong	21	22
PFQ	(Malaysia) Goh Y C (Malaysia) V Hoo K M	12	20
5	(Japan) A Sakuramoto (Japan) Y Takahata	21	21
(Japan) M Aratama (Japan) A Watanabe	19	10

Quarter-finals
4	(Thailand) C Chaladchalam (Thailand) P Muenwong	16	17
5	(Japan) A Sakuramoto (Japan) Y Takahata	21	21

=== Bottom half ===
==== Section 3 ====
First Round
(Chinese Taipei) Chen H-h (Chinese Taipei) Hu L-f	18	21	21
PFQ	(China) Dong WJ (China) Feng XY	21	19	19
(China) Cao TW (China) Zheng Y	21	21
7	(France) É Lefel (France) A Tran	16	15
Q2
(Japan) N Matsuyama (Japan) C Shida	w	/	o
(Malaysia) Teoh M X (Malaysia) Yap C W	9	16
3	(Japan) N Fukuman (Japan) K Yonao	21	21

Second Round
(Chinese Taipei) Chen H-h (Chinese Taipei) Hu L-f	18	10
(China) Cao TW (China) Zheng Y	21	21
(Japan) N Matsuyama (Japan) C Shida	21	21
3	(Japan) N Fukuman (Japan) K Yonao	14	17

Quarter-finals
(China) Cao TW (China) Zheng Y	14	13
(Japan) N Matsuyama (Japan) C Shida	21	21

==== Section 4 ====
First Round
(Indonesia) Y Barkah (Indonesia) R E Putri Sari	17	21	16
(Germany) J Goliszewski (Germany) L Käpplein	21	17	21
(Hong Kong) Ng T Y (Hong Kong) Yuen S Y	18	21	21
8	(India) A Ponnappa (India) N. S Reddy	21	13	14
(Thailand) S Paewsampran (Thailand) P Supajirakul	12	16
(Germany) I Herttrich (Germany) C Nelte	21	21
(England) J Pugh (England) L Smith	21	21
2	(Indonesia) D D Haris (Indonesia) R A Pradipta	17	17

Second Round
(Germany) J Goliszewski (Germany) L Käpplein	21	15
(Hong Kong) Ng T Y (Hong Kong) Yuen S Y	23	21
(Germany) I Herttrich (Germany) C Nelte	21	21
(England) J Pugh (England) L Smith	15	17

Quarter-finals
(Hong Kong) Ng T Y (Hong Kong) Yuen S Y	15	21
(Germany) I Herttrich (Germany) C Nelte	21	23

== Mixed doubles ==
=== Seeds ===
1. (Indonesia) Tontowi Ahmad / Liliyana Natsir (final)
2. (Malaysia) Goh Soon Huat / Shevon Jemie Lai (champions)
3. (England) Marcus Ellis / Lauren Smith (second round)
4. (England) Chris Adcock / Gabby Adcock (second round)
5. (Germany) Mark Lamsfuß / Isabel Herttrich (second round)
6. (Germany) Marvin Emil Seidel / Linda Efler (second round)
7. (Hong Kong) Lee Chun Hei / Chau Hoi Wah (quarter-finals)
8. (India) Pranav Chopra / N. Sikki Reddy (second round)

=== Finals ===
Semi-finals
1	(Indonesia) Tontowi Ahmad (Indonesia) Liliyana Natsir	26	21
(Indonesia) Akbar Bintang Cahyono (Indonesia) Winny Oktavina Kandow	24	17
(Thailand) Dechapol Puavaranukroh (Thailand) Sapsiree Taerattanachai	18	14
2	(Malaysia) Goh Soon Huat (Malaysia) Shevon Jemie Lai	21	21

Final
1	(Indonesia) Tontowi Ahmad (Indonesia) Liliyana Natsir	19	18
2	(Malaysia) Goh Soon Huat (Malaysia) Shevon Jemie Lai	21	21

=== Top half ===
==== Section 1 ====
First Round
1	(Indonesia) T Ahmad (Indonesia) L Natsir	21	21
Q4	(China) Ou XY (China) Cao TW	15	4
(England) G Mairs (England) J Moore	19	17
(Singapore) D B Chrisnanta (Singapore) C Wong J Y	21	21
7	(Hong Kong) Lee C H (Hong Kong) Chau H W	21	21
(Germany) P Käsbauer (Germany) O Konon	18	10
(Indonesia) A Ramadiansyah (Indonesia) M C Bandaso	16	19
(India) S Rankireddy (India) A Ponnappa	21	21

Second Round
1	(Indonesia) T Ahmad (Indonesia) L Natsir	21	21
(Singapore) D B Chrisnanta (Singapore) C Wong J Y	9	13
7	(Hong Kong) Lee C H (Hong Kong) Chau H W	21	16	21
(India) S Rankireddy (India) A Ponnappa	14	21	14

Quarter-finals
1	(Indonesia) T Ahmad (Indonesia) L Natsir	21	21
7	(Hong Kong) Lee C H (Hong Kong) Chau H W	16	15

==== Section 2 ====
First Round
3	(England) M Ellis (England) L Smith	21	21
(India) V G Prasad (India) J Dewangan	10	9
(Chinese Taipei) Liao M-c (Chinese Taipei) Chen H-h	21	21
(Thailand) N Phuangphuapet (Thailand) S Amitrapai	16	13
6	(Germany) M E Seidel (Germany) L Efler	15	21	21
(Indonesia) R Alexander (Indonesia) A Saufika	21	17	19
(Indonesia) A B Cahyono (Indonesia) W O Kandow	17	24	21
(Hong Kong) Mak H C (Hong Kong) Yeung N T	21	22	19

Second Round
3	(England) M Ellis (England) L Smith	21	25
(Chinese Taipei) Liao M-c (Chinese Taipei) Chen H-h	23	27
6	(Germany) M E Seidel (Germany) L Efler	21	17	22
(Indonesia) A B Cahyono (Indonesia) W O Kandow	17	21	24

Quarter-finals
(Chinese Taipei) Liao M-c (Chinese Taipei) Chen H-h	10	13
(Indonesia) A B Cahyono (Indonesia) W O Kandow	21	21

=== Bottom half ===
==== Section 3 ====
First Round
(France) T Gicquel (France) D Delrue	13	26
(Hong Kong) Chang T C (Hong Kong) Ng W Y	21	28
Q3	(Germany) J R Jansen (Germany) C Nelte	19	21	12
8	(India) P Chopra (India) N. S Reddy	21	16	21
(England) B Lane (England) J Pugh	13	13
(Thailand) D Puavaranukroh (Thailand) S Taerattanachai	21	21
(Indonesia) Y E Saputra (Indonesia) M G Islami	22	13	15
4	(England) C Adcock (England) G Adcock	20	21	21

Second Round
(Hong Kong) Chang T C (Hong Kong) Ng W Y	21	21
8	(India) P Chopra (India) N. S Reddy	15	11
(Thailand) D Puavaranukroh (Thailand) S Taerattanachai	21	25	21
4	(England) C Adcock (England) G Adcock	18	27	19

Quarter-finals
(Hong Kong) Chang T C (Hong Kong) Ng W Y	21	8	16
(Thailand) D Puavaranukroh (Thailand) S Taerattanachai	18	21	21

==== Section 4 ====
First Round
(France) B Kersaudy (France) L Palermo	21	17	15
Q1	(Indonesia) R Rivaldy (Indonesia) P H Mentari	10	21	21
(China) Lu K (China) Chen L	13	19
5	(Germany) M Lamsfuß (Germany) I Herttrich	21	21
(China) Ren XY (China) Tang JH	21	18	21
Q2	(Thailand) P Thongnuam (Thailand) K Dupthuk	14	21	14
(Singapore) T Hee Y K (Singapore) Citra P S D	16	20
2	(Malaysia) Goh S H (Malaysia) S J Lai	21	22

Second Round
Q1	(Indonesia) R Rivaldy (Indonesia) P H Mentari	13	21	21
5	(Germany) M Lamsfuß (Germany) I Herttrich	21	14	15
(China) Ren XY (China) Tang JH	19	9
2	(Malaysia) Goh S H (Malaysia) S J Lai	21	21

Quarter-finals
Q1	(Indonesia) R Rivaldy (Indonesia) P H Mentari	17	13
2	(Malaysia) Goh S H (Malaysia) S J Lai	21	21

Preceded by 2017 Singapore Super Series	Singapore Open	Succeeded by 2019 Singapore Open
Preceded by 2018 Thailand Open	BWF World Tour; 2018 BWF season	Succeeded by 2018 Akita Masters
