= 2018 Indonesia Open (badminton) =

2018 badminton tournament in Jakarta

Tournament details
- Dates: 3–8 July
- Edition: 37th
- Level: Super 1000
- Total prize money: US$1,250,000
- Venue: Istora Gelora Bung Karno
- Location: Jakarta, Indonesia

Champions
- Men's singles: (Japan) Kento Momota
- Women's singles: (Chinese Taipei) Tai Tzu-ying
- Men's doubles: (Indonesia) Marcus Fernaldi Gideon (Indonesia) Kevin Sanjaya Sukamuljo
- Women's doubles: (Japan) Yuki Fukushima (Japan) Sayaka Hirota
- Mixed doubles: (Indonesia) Tontowi Ahmad (Indonesia) Liliyana Natsir

The 2018 Indonesia Open (officially known as the BLIBLI Indonesia Open 2018 for sponsorship reasons) was a badminton tournament which took place at Istora Gelora Bung Karno in Jakarta, Indonesia, from 3 to 8 July 2018 and had a total purse of $1,250,000.

== Tournament ==
The 2018 Indonesia Open was the twelfth tournament of the 2018 BWF World Tour and also part of the Indonesia Open championships which had been held since 1982. This tournament was organized by the Badminton Association of Indonesia with the sanction from the BWF.

=== Venue ===
This international tournament was held at the Istora Gelora Bung Karno in Jakarta, Indonesia.

=== Point distribution ===
Below is the point distribution for each phase of the tournament based on the BWF points system for the BWF World Tour Super 1000 event.

Winner	Runner-up	3/4	5/8	9/16	17/32
12,000	10,200	8,400	6,600	4,800	3,000

=== Prize money ===
The total prize money for this tournament was US$1,250,000. Distribution of prize money was in accordance with BWF regulations.

Event	Winner	Finals	Semi-finals	Quarter-finals	Last 16	Last 32
Singles	$87,500	$42,500	$17,500	$6,875	$3,750	$1,250
Doubles	$92,500	$43,750	$17,500	$7,812.50	$4,062.50	$1,250

== Men's singles ==
=== Seeds ===
1. (Denmark) Viktor Axelsen (final)
2. (South Korea) Son Wan-ho (first round)
3. (China) Shi Yuqi (semi-finals)
4. (India) Srikanth Kidambi (first round)
5. (China) Chen Long (first round)
6. (Chinese Taipei) Chou Tien-chen (second round)
7. (Malaysia) Lee Chong Wei (semi-finals)
8. (India) Prannoy Kumar (quarter-finals)

=== Finals ===
Semi-finals
1	(Denmark) Viktor Axelsen	18	21	21
3	(China) Shi Yuqi	21	14	11
(Japan) Kento Momota	23	21
7	(Malaysia) Lee Chong Wei	21	12

Final
1	(Denmark) Viktor Axelsen	14	9
(Japan) Kento Momota	21	21

=== Top half ===
==== Section 1 ====
First Round
1	(Denmark) V Axelsen	21	21
(Indonesia) J Christie	10	19
(Denmark) R Gemke	9	21	20
(India) S Verma	21	12	22
5	(China) Chen L	21	20	19
(France) B Leverdez	17	22	21
PFR	(Japan) K Tsuneyama	12	21	21
(Denmark) J Ø. Jørgensen	21	17	6

Second Round
1	(Denmark) V Axelsen	21	21
(India) S Verma	15	14
(France) B Leverdez	22	13
PFR	(Japan) K Tsuneyama	24	21

Quarter-finals
1	(Denmark) V Axelsen	21	21
PFR	(Japan) K Tsuneyama	11	10

==== Section 2 ====
First Round
3	(China) Shi YQ	16	21	21
(England) R Ouseph	21	18	18
(Thailand) T Saensomboonsuk	17	13
(Japan) K Sakai	21	21
8	(India) Prannoy K	21	9	21
(China) Lin D	15	21	14
(Chinese Taipei) Wang T-w	21	21
(India) B. S Praneeth	10	13

Second Round
3	(China) Shi YQ	21	21
(Japan) K Sakai	14	17
8	(India) Prannoy K	21	21	21
(Chinese Taipei) Wang T-w	23	15	13

Quarter-finals
3	(China) Shi YQ	21	21
8	(India) Prannoy K	17	18

=== Bottom half ===
==== Section 3 ====
First Round
(Indonesia) T Sugiarto	20	21	21
(Thailand) K Phetpradab	22	10	16
(Hong Kong) Wong W K	17	11
6	(Chinese Taipei) Chou T-c	21	21
(Netherlands) M Caljouw	9	17
(Indonesia) A S Ginting	21	21
(Japan) K Momota	12	21	21
4	(India) S Kidambi	21	14	15

Second Round
(Indonesia) T Sugiarto	21	14	21
6	(Chinese Taipei) Chou T-c	13	21	18
(Indonesia) A S Ginting	14	15
(Japan) K Momota	21	21

Quarter-finals
(Indonesia) T Sugiarto	11	15
(Japan) K Momota	21	21

==== Section 4 ====
First Round
(Denmark) A Antonsen	21	25
(Japan) K Nishimoto	14	23
(Hong Kong) Ng K L	15	21	10
7	(Malaysia) Lee C W	21	18	21
(South Korea) Lee H-i	13	21	22
(Thailand) K Wangcharoen	21	12	24
(Denmark) H-K Vittinghus	11
2	(South Korea) Son W-h	6^{r}

Second Round
(Denmark) A Antonsen	12	15
7	(Malaysia) Lee C W	21	21
(Thailand) K Wangcharoen	21	21
(Denmark) H-K Vittinghus	18	11

Quarter-finals
7	(Malaysia) Lee C W	21	22
(Thailand) K Wangcharoen	13	20

== Women's singles ==
=== Seeds ===
1. (Chinese Taipei) Tai Tzu-ying (champion)
2. (Japan) Akane Yamaguchi (quarter-finals)
3. (India) P. V. Sindhu (quarter-finals)
4. (Thailand) Ratchanok Intanon (quarter-finals)
5. (China) Chen Yufei (final)
6. (Spain) Carolina Marín (first round)
7. (South Korea) Sung Ji-hyun (semi-finals)
8. (China) He Bingjiao (semi-finals)

=== Finals ===
Semi-finals
1	(Chinese Taipei) Tai Tzu-ying	21	21
8	(China) He Bingjiao	13	18
7	(South Korea) Sung Ji-hyun	23	18	21
5	(China) Chen Yufei	21	21	23

Final
1	(Chinese Taipei) Tai Tzu-ying	21	21	21
5	(China) Chen Yufei	23	15	9

=== Top half ===
==== Section 1 ====
First Round
1	(Chinese Taipei) Tai T-y	21	23
(Japan) S Kawakami	11	21
(Denmark) L Kjærsfeldt	21	21
(India) V R Jakka	12	10
6	(Spain) C Marín	21	20	18
(Japan) S Sato	11	22	21
PFR	(Indonesia) L A Mainaky	15	5
(Scotland) K Gilmour	21	21

Second Round
1	(Chinese Taipei) Tai T-y	21	21
(Denmark) L Kjærsfeldt	15	8
(Japan) S Sato	19	21	14
(Scotland) K Gilmour	21	17	21

Quarter-finals
1	(Chinese Taipei) Tai T-y	21	21
(Scotland) K Gilmour	16	11

==== Section 2 ====
First Round
3	(India) P. V. Sindhu	21	19	21
(Thailand) P Chochuwong	15	21	13
(Japan) A Ohori	21	21	21
(United States) Zhang BW	15	23	11
8	(China) He BJ	21	21
(Hong Kong) Cheung N Y	19	13
(Chinese Taipei) Pai Y-p	21	16	13
(Thailand) B Ongbamrungphan	15	21	21

Second Round
3	(India) P. V. Sindhu	21	21
(Japan) A Ohori	17	14
8	(China) He BJ	21	21
(Thailand) B Ongbamrungphan	15	12

Quarter-finals
3	(India) P. V. Sindhu	14	15
8	(China) He BJ	21	21

=== Bottom half ===
==== Section 3 ====
First Round
(Canada) M Li	21	21
(Denmark) M Blichfeldt	18	17
(Spain) B Corrales	9	16
7	(South Korea) Sung J-h	21	21
(Indonesia) G M Tunjung	21	21
(Chinese Taipei) Lee C-h	13	7
(Indonesia) Fitriani	8	16
4	(Thailand) R Intanon	21	21

Second Round
(Canada) M Li	11	14
7	(South Korea) Sung J-h	21	21
(Indonesia) G M Tunjung	11	21	14
4	(Thailand) R Intanon	21	17	21

Quarter-finals
7	(South Korea) Sung J-h	21	21
4	(Thailand) R Intanon	12	12

==== Section 4 ====
First Round
(India) S Nehwal	21	21
(Indonesia) D D Ayustine	12	12
(Russia) E Kosetskaya	10	15
5	(China) Chen YF	21	21
(Japan) N Okuhara	21	21
(Chinese Taipei) Chiang Y-l	11	11
(Thailand) N Jindapol	15	19
2	(Japan) A Yamaguchi	21	21

Second Round
(India) S Nehwal	18	15
5	(China) Chen YF	21	21
(Japan) N Okuhara	9	21	22
2	(Japan) A Yamaguchi	21	14	24

Quarter-finals
5	(China) Chen YF	23	21
2	(Japan) A Yamaguchi	21	8

== Men's doubles ==
=== Seeds ===
1. (Indonesia) Marcus Fernaldi Gideon / Kevin Sanjaya Sukamuljo (champions)
2. (Denmark) Mathias Boe / Carsten Mogensen (first round)
3. (China) Liu Cheng / Zhang Nan (quarter-finals)
4. (China) Li Junhui / Liu Yuchen (second round)
5. (Denmark) Mads Conrad-Petersen / Mads Pieler Kolding (quarter-finals)
6. (Japan) Takeshi Kamura / Keigo Sonoda (first round)
7. (Japan) Takuto Inoue / Yuki Kaneko (final)
8. (Denmark) Kim Astrup / Anders Skaarup Rasmussen (second round)

=== Finals ===
Semi-finals
1	(Indonesia) Marcus Fernaldi Gideon (Indonesia) Kevin Sanjaya Sukamuljo	21	21
(Indonesia) Fajar Alfian (Indonesia) Muhammad Rian Ardianto	13	10
7	(Japan) Takuto Inoue (Japan) Yuki Kaneko	21	21
(Chinese Taipei) Liao Min-chun (Chinese Taipei) Su Cheng-heng	13	11

Final
1	(Indonesia) Marcus Fernaldi Gideon (Indonesia) Kevin Sanjaya Sukamuljo	21	21
7	(Japan) Takuto Inoue (Japan) Yuki Kaneko	13	16

=== Top half ===
==== Section 1 ====
First Round
1	(Indonesia) M F Gideon (Indonesia) K S Sukamuljo	21	18	21
(Indonesia) M Ahsan (Indonesia) H Setiawan	16	21	10
(Indonesia) W Nayaka (Indonesia) A Yusuf	18	11
(Malaysia) Ong Y S (Malaysia) Teo E Y	21	21
5	(Denmark) M Conrad-Petersen (Denmark) M P Kolding	21	21
(Chinese Taipei) Chen H-l (Chinese Taipei) Wang C-l	19	13
(Indonesia) R Karanda Suwardi (Indonesia) A Pratama	16	21	26
(China) He JT (China) Tan Q	21	17	24

Second Round
1	(Indonesia) M F Gideon (Indonesia) K S Sukamuljo	21	21
(Malaysia) Ong Y S (Malaysia) Teo E Y	18	12
5	(Denmark) M Conrad-Petersen (Denmark) M P Kolding	21	21
(Indonesia) R Karanda Suwardi (Indonesia) A Pratama	12	17

Quarter-finals
1	(Indonesia) M F Gideon (Indonesia) K S Sukamuljo	20	22	21
5	(Denmark) M Conrad-Petersen (Denmark) M P Kolding	22	20	18

==== Section 2 ====
First Round
3	(China) Liu C (China) Zhang N	15	21	21
(India) M Attri (India) B. S Reddy	21	15	17
PFR	(Indonesia) F W Putra (Indonesia) R A Saputro	13	13
(China) Huang KX (China) Wang YL	21	21
6	(Japan) T Kamura (Japan) K Sonoda	18	21	18
(Indonesia) F Alfian (Indonesia) M R Ardianto	21	14	21
(South Korea) Chung E-s (South Korea) Kim D-y	29	10	13
(Netherlands) J Maas (Netherlands) R Tabeling	27	21	21

Second Round
3	(China) Liu C (China) Zhang N	15	21	21
(China) Huang KX (China) Wang YL	21	13	13
(Indonesia) F Alfian (Indonesia) M R Ardianto	21	19	21
(Netherlands) J Maas (Netherlands) R Tabeling	18	21	14

Quarter-finals
3	(China) Liu C (China) Zhang N	18	21	23
(Indonesia) F Alfian (Indonesia) M R Ardianto	21	18	25

=== Bottom half ===
==== Section 3 ====
First Round
(Denmark) M Christiansen (Denmark) D Daugaard	19	24
(Thailand) T Isriyanet (Thailand) K Namdash	21	26
(Chinese Taipei) Lu C-y (Chinese Taipei) Yang P-h	18	21	14
7	(Japan) T Inoue (Japan) Y Kaneko	21	18	21
(Russia) V Ivanov (Russia) I Sozonov	21	21
(Denmark) K Antonsen (Denmark) N Nøhr	11	14
(Japan) T Hoki (Japan) Y Kobayashi	18	16
4	(China) Li JH (China) Liu YC	21	21

Second Round
(Thailand) T Isriyanet (Thailand) K Namdash	17	18
7	(Japan) T Inoue (Japan) Y Kaneko	21	21
(Russia) V Ivanov (Russia) I Sozonov	21	21
4	(China) Li JH (China) Liu YC	19	15

Quarter-finals
7	(Japan) T Inoue (Japan) Y Kaneko	21	21
(Russia) V Ivanov (Russia) I Sozonov	17	19

==== Section 4 ====
First Round
(China) Han CK (China) Zhou HD	22	18	18
(Indonesia) B Angriawan (Indonesia) Hardianto	20	21	21
(Malaysia) Goh V S (Malaysia) Tan W K	17	21	15
8	(Denmark) K Astrup (Denmark) A S Rasmussen	21	19	21
(Japan) H Endo (Japan) Y Watanabe	21	21
(India) S Rankireddy (India) C Shetty	8	15
(Chinese Taipei) Liao M-c (Chinese Taipei) Su C-h	21	21
2	(Denmark) M Boe (Denmark) C Mogensen	13	15

Second Round
(Indonesia) B Angriawan (Indonesia) Hardianto	21	21
8	(Denmark) K Astrup (Denmark) A S Rasmussen	14	12
(Japan) H Endo (Japan) Y Watanabe	19	21	20
(Chinese Taipei) Liao M-c (Chinese Taipei) Su C-h	21	12	22

Quarter-finals
(Indonesia) B Angriawan (Indonesia) Hardianto	13	8
(Chinese Taipei) Liao M-c (Chinese Taipei) Su C-h	21	21

== Women's doubles ==
=== Seeds ===
1. (China) Chen Qingchen / Jia Yifan (semi-finals)
2. (Japan) Yuki Fukushima / Sayaka Hirota (champions)
3. (Denmark) Kamilla Rytter Juhl / Christinna Pedersen (first round)
4. (Japan) Shiho Tanaka / Koharu Yonemoto (second round)
5. (Japan) Misaki Matsutomo / Ayaka Takahashi (semi-finals)
6. (South Korea) Lee So-hee / Shin Seung-chan (quarter-finals)
7. (Indonesia) Greysia Polii / Apriyani Rahayu (quarter-finals)
8. (Thailand) Jongkolphan Kititharakul / Rawinda Prajongjai (second round)

=== Finals ===
Semi-finals
1	(China) Chen Qingchen (China) Jia Yifan	13	18
(Japan) Mayu Matsumoto (Japan) Wakana Nagahara	21	21
5	(Japan) Misaki Matsutomo (Japan) Ayaka Takahashi	23	21	13
2	(Japan) Yuki Fukushima (Japan) Sayaka Hirota	25	12	21

Final
(Japan) Mayu Matsumoto (Japan) Wakana Nagahara	14	21	14
2	(Japan) Yuki Fukushima (Japan) Sayaka Hirota	21	16	21

=== Top half ===
==== Section 1 ====
First Round
1	(China) Chen QC (China) Jia YF	13	21	21
(South Korea) Chang Y-n (South Korea) Jung K-e	21	17	17
(Indonesia) K N Hanadia (Indonesia) D T Permatasari	23	13
(Malaysia) Chow M K (Malaysia) Lee M Y	25	21
6	(South Korea) Lee S-h (South Korea) Shin S-c	21	10	22
(Bulgaria) G Stoeva (Bulgaria) S Stoeva	15	21	20
(Indonesia) R E P Sari (Indonesia) M C Sahputri	20	15
(Indonesia) D Fitriani (Indonesia) N Melati	22	21

Second Round
1	(China) Chen QC (China) Jia YF	22	21
(Malaysia) Chow M K (Malaysia) Lee M Y	20	18
6	(South Korea) Lee S-h (South Korea) Shin S-c	21	21
(Indonesia) D Fitriani (Indonesia) N Melati	12	10

Quarter-finals
1	(China) Chen QC (China) Jia YF	21	21
6	(South Korea) Lee S-h (South Korea) Shin S-c	14	14

==== Section 2 ====
First Round
3	(Denmark) K R Juhl (Denmark) C Pedersen	21	5	9
(Chinese Taipei) Hsu Y-c (Chinese Taipei) Wu T-j	17	21	21
(China) Du Y (China) Li YH	21	21
(South Korea) Kim H-r (South Korea) Kong H-y	14	2
8	(Thailand) J Kititharakul (Thailand) R Prajongjai	21	21
(United States) A Lee (United States) S Lee	1	5
(Japan) N Fukuman (Japan) K Yonao	24	21	23
(Japan) M Matsumoto (Japan) W Nagahara	26	19	25

Second Round
(Chinese Taipei) Hsu Y-c (Chinese Taipei) Wu T-j	24	19	21
(China) Du Y (China) Li YH	22	21	17
8	(Thailand) J Kititharakul (Thailand) R Prajongjai	14	18
(Japan) M Matsumoto (Japan) W Nagahara	21	21

Quarter-finals
(Chinese Taipei) Hsu Y-c (Chinese Taipei) Wu T-j	17	19
(Japan) M Matsumoto (Japan) W Nagahara	21	21

=== Bottom half ===
==== Section 3 ====
First Round
(India) M Jakkampudi (India) P S. Ram	11	18
(Indonesia) A Imanuela (Indonesia) S F S Ramadhanti	21	21
(Indonesia) J F Sugiarto (Indonesia) V Putri	15	6
5	(Japan) M Matsutomo (Japan) A Takahashi	21	21
(China) Huang DP (China) Li WM	21	21
(Netherlands) S Piek (Netherlands) C Seinen	16	15
(Thailand) C Chaladchalam (Thailand) P Muenwong	10	24	15
4	(Japan) S Tanaka (Japan) K Yonemoto	21	22	21

Second Round
(Indonesia) A Imanuela (Indonesia) S F S Ramadhanti	21	12	11
5	(Japan) M Matsutomo (Japan) A Takahashi	17	21	21
(China) Huang DP (China) Li WM	21	21
4	(Japan) S Tanaka (Japan) K Yonemoto	16	18

Quarter-finals
5	(Japan) M Matsutomo (Japan) A Takahashi	13	21	21
(China) Huang DP (China) Li WM	21	12	19

==== Section 4 ====
First Round
(Indonesia) A S Awanda (Indonesia) N K M Istirani	21	21
(Indonesia) P Z Bernadeth (Indonesia) T R Nuraidah	18	17
(Denmark) M Fruergaard (Denmark) S Thygesen	14	13
7	(Indonesia) G Polii (Indonesia) A Rahayu	21	21
(Indonesia) Y Barkah (Indonesia) N K Maheswari	18	19
(Malaysia) V Hoo (Malaysia) Yap C W	21	21
(Indonesia) D D Haris (Indonesia) R A Pradipta	16	18
2	(Japan) Y Fukushima (Japan) S Hirota	21	21

Second Round
(Indonesia) A S Awanda (Indonesia) N K M Istirani	18	19
7	(Indonesia) G Polii (Indonesia) A Rahayu	21	21
(Malaysia) V Hoo (Malaysia) Yap C W	19	21
2	(Japan) Y Fukushima (Japan) S Hirota	21	23

Quarter-finals
7	(Indonesia) G Polii (Indonesia) A Rahayu	14	20
2	(Japan) Y Fukushima (Japan) S Hirota	21	22

== Mixed doubles ==
=== Seeds ===
1. (Indonesia) Tontowi Ahmad / Liliyana Natsir (champions)
2. (China) Wang Yilü / Huang Dongping (quarter-finals)
3. (Hong Kong) Tang Chun Man / Tse Ying Suet (first round)
4. (China) Zheng Siwei / Huang Yaqiong (semi-finals)
5. (China) Zhang Nan / Li Yinhui (quarter-finals)
6. (Denmark) Mathias Christiansen / Christinna Pedersen (second round)
7. (Malaysia) Goh Soon Huat / Shevon Jemie Lai (first round)
8. (England) Chris Adcock / Gabrielle Adcock (second round)

=== Finals ===
Semi-finals
1	(Indonesia) Tontowi Ahmad (Indonesia) Liliyana Natsir	21	21
(Indonesia) Hafiz Faizal (Indonesia) Gloria Emanuelle Widjaja	18	8
4	(China) Zheng Siwei (China) Huang Yaqiong	18	16
(Malaysia) Chan Peng Soon (Malaysia) Goh Liu Ying	21	21

Final
1	(Indonesia) Tontowi Ahmad (Indonesia) Liliyana Natsir	21	21
(Malaysia) Chan Peng Soon (Malaysia) Goh Liu Ying	17	8

=== Top half ===
==== Section 1 ====
First Round
1	(Indonesia) T Ahmad (Indonesia) L Natsir	21	21
(Malaysia) Tan K M (Malaysia) Lai P J	11	14
(Japan) Y Kobayashi (Japan) M Matsutomo	21	17	21
(Indonesia) Y E Saputra (Indonesia) M G Islami	18	21	8
5	(China) Zhang N (China) Li YH	21	21
(Russia) E Dremin (Russia) E Dimova	17	13
(Hong Kong) Lee C H (Hong Kong) Chau H W	17	21	21
(Indonesia) P Jordan (Indonesia) M D Oktavianti	21	14	17

Second Round
1	(Indonesia) T Ahmad (Indonesia) L Natsir	23	21
(Japan) Y Kobayashi (Japan) M Matsutomo	21	19
5	(China) Zhang N (China) Li YH	21	21
(Hong Kong) Lee C H (Hong Kong) Chau H W	11	6

Quarter-finals
1	(Indonesia) T Ahmad (Indonesia) L Natsir	21	21
5	(China) Zhang N (China) Li YH	17	14

==== Section 2 ====
First Round
3	(Hong Kong) Tang C M (Hong Kong) Tse Y S	19	21	15
(Thailand) D Puavaranukroh (Thailand) S Taerattanachai	21	13	21
(China) He JT (China) Du Y	21	13	22
(Indonesia) R Karanda Suwardi (Indonesia) D Susanto	17	21	24
6	(Denmark) M Christiansen (Denmark) C Pedersen	21	21
(Republic of Ireland) S Magee (Republic of Ireland) C Magee	12	14
(Indonesia) H Faizal (Indonesia) G E Widjaja	20	21	21
(France) R Labar (France) A Fontaine	22	11	15

Second Round
(Thailand) D Puavaranukroh (Thailand) S Taerattanachai	14	19
(Indonesia) R Karanda Suwardi (Indonesia) D Susanto	21	21
6	(Denmark) M Christiansen (Denmark) C Pedersen	21	13	7
(Indonesia) H Faizal (Indonesia) G E Widjaja	14	21	21

Quarter-finals
(Indonesia) R Karanda Suwardi (Indonesia) D Susanto	15	24	19
(Indonesia) H Faizal (Indonesia) G E Widjaja	21	22	21

=== Bottom half ===
==== Section 3 ====
First Round
(Chinese Taipei) Lu C-y (Chinese Taipei) Hu L-f	15	18
(Japan) Y Watanabe (Japan) A Higashino	21	21
(Netherlands) J Arends (Netherlands) S Piek	14	13
8	(England) C Adcock (England) G Adcock	21	21
(Chinese Taipei) Wang C-l (Chinese Taipei) Lee C-h	21	26
(Indonesia) R Widianto (Indonesia) M Mahmudin	12	24
(India) P Chopra (India) N. S Reddy	12	14
4	(China) Zheng SW (China) Huang YQ	21	21

Second Round
(Japan) Y Watanabe (Japan) A Higashino	21	16	21
8	(England) C Adcock (England) G Adcock	19	21	13
(Chinese Taipei) Wang C-l (Chinese Taipei) Lee C-h	12	21	16
4	(China) Zheng SW (China) Huang YQ	21	17	21

Quarter-finals
(Japan) Y Watanabe (Japan) A Higashino	13	21	10
4	(China) Zheng SW (China) Huang YQ	21	16	21

==== Section 4 ====
First Round
(Denmark) N Nøhr (Denmark) S Thygesen	21	21
(Japan) T Hoki (Japan) K Yonemoto	19	19
(Malaysia) Chan P S (Malaysia) Goh L Y	21	21
7	(Malaysia) Goh S H (Malaysia) S J Lai	19	19
(Denmark) J F Nielsen (Denmark) A Bøje	17	21	24
(Indonesia) R Alexander (Indonesia) A Saufika	21	16	22
(Netherlands) R Tabeling (Netherlands) C Seinen	10	16
2	(China) Wang YL (China) Huang DP	21	21

Second Round
(Denmark) N Nøhr (Denmark) S Thygesen	15	17
(Malaysia) Chan P S (Malaysia) Goh L Y	21	21
(Denmark) J F Nielsen (Denmark) A Bøje	16	18
2	(China) Wang YL (China) Huang DP	21	21

Quarter-finals
(Malaysia) Chan P S (Malaysia) Goh L Y	21	21
2	(China) Wang YL (China) Huang DP	19	14

Preceded by 2018 Malaysia Open	BWF World Tour; 2018 BWF season	Succeeded by 2018 Thailand Open
