= 2018 Thailand Open (badminton) =

2018 badminton tournament in Bangkok

Tournament details
- Dates: 10–15 July
- Level: Super 500
- Total prize money: US$350,000
- Venue: Nimibutr Stadium
- Location: Bangkok, Thailand

Champions
- Men's singles: (Japan) Kanta Tsuneyama
- Women's singles: (Japan) Nozomi Okuhara
- Men's doubles: (Japan) Takeshi Kamura (Japan) Keigo Sonoda
- Women's doubles: (Indonesia) Greysia Polii (Indonesia) Apriyani Rahayu
- Mixed doubles: (Indonesia) Hafiz Faizal (Indonesia) Gloria Emanuelle Widjaja

The 2018 Thailand Open (officially known as the Toyota Thailand Open 2018 for sponsorship reasons) was a badminton tournament which took place at Nimibutr Stadium in Bangkok, Thailand, from 10 to 15 July 2018 and had a total purse of $350,000.

== Tournament ==
The 2018 Thailand Open was the thirteenth tournament of the 2018 BWF World Tour and also part of the Thailand Open championships, which had been held since 1984. This tournament was organized by the Badminton Association of Thailand with the sanction from BWF.

=== Venue ===
This international tournament was held at Nimibutr Stadium in Bangkok, Thailand.

=== Point distribution ===
Below is the point distribution for each phase of the tournament based on the BWF points system for the BWF World Tour Super 500 event.

Winner	Runner-up	3/4	5/8	9/16	17/32	33/64	65/128
9,200	7,800	6,420	5,040	3,600	2,220	880	430

=== Prize money ===
The total prize money for this tournament was US$350,000. Distribution of prize money was in accordance with BWF regulations.

Event	Winner	Finals	Semi-finals	Quarter-finals	Last 16
Singles	$26,250	$13,300	$5,075	$2,100	$1,225
Doubles	$27,650	$13,300	$4,900	$2,537.50	$1,312.50

== Men's singles ==
=== Seeds ===
1. (China) Shi Yuqi (withdrew)
2. (India) Srikanth Kidambi (withdrew)
3. (China) Chen Long (withdrew)
4. (India) Prannoy Kumar (second round)
5. (Japan) Kenta Nishimoto (quarter-finals)
6. (Chinese Taipei) Wang Tzu-wei (withdrew)
7. (Japan) Kazumasa Sakai (first round)
8. (India) Sameer Verma (first round)

=== Finals ===
Semi-finals
(Japan) Kanta Tsuneyama	21	14	23
Q3	(Indonesia) Sony Dwi Kuncoro	13	21	21
(Thailand) Suppanyu Avihingsanon	15	12
(Indonesia) Tommy Sugiarto	21	21

Final
(Japan) Kanta Tsuneyama	21	13	21
(Indonesia) Tommy Sugiarto	16	21	9

=== Top half ===
==== Section 1 ====
First Round
PFQ	(Canada) J Ho-shue	15	17
(India) P Kashyap	21	21
(Japan) K Tsuneyama	21	21	21
(Hong Kong) Lee C Y	23	11	17
PFQ	(Thailand) P Thonghuam	12	15
(Thailand) K Phetpradab	21	21
(England) R Ouseph	21	21	21
(Hong Kong) Hu Y	12	23	19

Second Round
(India) P Kashyap	18	21	19
(Japan) K Tsuneyama	21	18	21
(Thailand) K Phetpradab	23	21
(England) R Ouseph	21	13

Quarter-finals
(Japan) K Tsuneyama	21	21
(Thailand) K Phetpradab	15	13

==== Section 2 ====
First Round
4	(India) Prannoy K	21	21
(Spain) P Abián	16	19
(Indonesia) I M Mustofa	19	8
Q3	(Indonesia) S D Kuncoro	21	21
7	(Japan) K Sakai	21	21	11
(Malaysia) Chong W F	23	17	21
(Malaysia) Liew D	17	18
(China) Huang YX	21	21

Second Round
4	(India) Prannoy K	18	14
Q3	(Indonesia) S D Kuncoro	21	21
(Malaysia) Chong W F	9	19
(China) Huang YX	21	21

Quarter-finals
Q3	(Indonesia) S D Kuncoro	21	21
(China) Huang YX	9	8

=== Bottom half ===
==== Section 3 ====
First Round
(France) B Leverdez	21	18	14
Q1	(China) Lu GZ	14	21	21
(Chinese Taipei) Hsu J-h	7	17
5	(Japan) K Nishimoto	21	21
(France) L Corvée	18	17
(Thailand) S Avihingsanon	21	21
(Malaysia) Lee Z J	21	16	21
PFQ	(Russia) V Malkov	11	21	16

Second Round
Q1	(China) Lu GZ	16	22	19
5	(Japan) K Nishimoto	21	20	21
(Thailand) S Avihingsanon	21	21
(Malaysia) Lee Z J	18	12

Quarter-finals
5	(Japan) K Nishimoto	19	16
(Thailand) S Avihingsanon	21	21

==== Section 4 ====
First Round
(Indonesia) T Sugiarto	21	21
(China) Qiao B	14	15
(Thailand) T Saensomboonsuk	21	21
8	(India) S Verma	18	16
(Thailand) K Wangcharoen	19	21	24
Q4	(Malaysia) Leong J H	21	9	22
Q2	(Thailand) S Thammasin	15	21	21
PFQ	(England) T Penty	21	15	12

Second Round
(Indonesia) T Sugiarto	19	21	21
(Thailand) T Saensomboonsuk	21	18	16
(Thailand) K Wangcharoen	21	21
Q2	(Thailand) S Thammasin	11	9

Quarter-finals
(Indonesia) T Sugiarto	21	11	21
(Thailand) K Wangcharoen	11	21	13

== Women's singles ==
=== Seeds ===
1. (Japan) Akane Yamaguchi (quarter-finals)
2. (India) P. V. Sindhu (final)
3. (Thailand) Ratchanok Intanon (withdrew)
4. (Japan) Nozomi Okuhara (champion)
5. (India) Saina Nehwal (withdrew)
6. (Thailand) Nitchaon Jindapol (first round)
7. (United States) Zhang Beiwen (semi-finals)
8. (Japan) Sayaka Sato (second round)

=== Finals ===
Semi-finals
7	(United States) Zhang Beiwen	17	10
4	(Japan) Nozomi Okuhara	21	21
(Indonesia) Gregoria Mariska Tunjung	21	21	9
2	(India) P. V. Sindhu	23	16	21

Final
4	(Japan) Nozomi Okuhara	21	21
2	(India) P. V. Sindhu	15	18

=== Top half ===
==== Section 1 ====
First Round
1	(Japan) A Yamaguchi	21	21
(China) Gao FJ	14	14
(Malaysia) Goh J W	21	21
(Indonesia) Fitriani	12	9
7	(United States) Zhang BW	21	21
(Chinese Taipei) Chiang Y-l	15	14
(Malaysia) Lee Y Y	17	10
(Indonesia) D D Ayustine	21	21

Second Round
1	(Japan) A Yamaguchi	21	21
(Malaysia) Goh J W	15	12
7	(United States) Zhang BW	21	19	21
(Indonesia) D D Ayustine	16	21	11

Quarter-finals
1	(Japan) A Yamaguchi	21	19	19
7	(United States) Zhang BW	14	21	21

==== Section 2 ====
First Round
4	(Japan) N Okuhara	21	21
(Russia) E Kosetskaya	12	12
(Thailand) P Chochuwong	21	21
(Spain) B Corrales	6	11
8	(Japan) S Sato	21	21
(India) V R Jakka	13	17
(Japan) A Ohori	21	21
PFQ	(Indonesia) L A Mainaky	13	11

Second Round
4	(Japan) N Okuhara	21	21
(Thailand) P Chochuwong	18	15
8	(Japan) S Sato	21	19	18
(Japan) A Ohori	9	21	21

Quarter-finals
4	(Japan) N Okuhara	21	15	21
(Japan) A Ohori	12	21	19

=== Bottom half ===
==== Section 3 ====
First Round
(Canada) M Li	21	21
Q3	(Indonesia) Y Y Susanto	12	9
(Thailand) B Ongbamrungphan	21	11
PFQ	(Switzerland) S Jaquet	9	5^{r}
(Japan) S Kawakami	23	21
Q1	(China) Han Y	21	16
(Indonesia) G M Tunjung	21	21
PFQ	(England) C Birch	14	7

Second Round
(Canada) M Li	15	21	21
(Thailand) B Ongbamrungphan	21	12	19
(Japan) S Kawakami	12	18
(Indonesia) G M Tunjung	21	21

Quarter-finals
(Canada) M Li	17	8
(Indonesia) G M Tunjung	21	21

==== Section 4 ====
First Round
Q2	(China) Zhang YM	21	16	21
Q4	(Thailand) C Jucharoen	15	21	13
(Malaysia) S Cheah S Y	21	21
6	(Thailand) N Jindapol	16	14
(Hong Kong) Yip P Y	21	21
(Chinese Taipei) Lee C-h	14	10
(Bulgaria) L Zetchiri	8	15
2	(India) P. V. Sindhu	21	21

Second Round
Q2	(China) Zhang YM	17	17
(Malaysia) S Cheah S Y	21	21
(Hong Kong) Yip P Y	16	14
2	(India) P. V. Sindhu	21	21

Quarter-finals
(Malaysia) S Cheah S Y	17	13
2	(India) P. V. Sindhu	21	21

== Men's doubles ==
=== Seeds ===
1. (Japan) Takeshi Kamura / Keigo Sonoda (champions)
2. (Chinese Taipei) Lee Jhe-huei / Lee Yang (second round)
3. (Japan) Takuto Inoue / Yuki Kaneko (semi-finals)
4. (Chinese Taipei) Chen Hung-ling / Wang Chi-lin (first round)
5. (Chinese Taipei) Liao Min-chun / Su Ching-heng (quarter-finals)
6. (Chinese Taipei) Lu Ching-yao / Yang Po-han (second round)
7. (Japan) Takuro Hoki / Yugo Kobayashi (first round)
8. (India) Satwiksairaj Rankireddy / Chirag Shetty (first round)

=== Finals ===
Semi-finals
1	(Japan) Takeshi Kamura (Japan) Keigo Sonoda	21	21
3	(Japan) Takuto Inoue (Japan) Yuki Kaneko	19	17
(Japan) Hiroyuki Endo (Japan) Yuta Watanabe	19	22	21
(Thailand) Bodin Isara (Thailand) Maneepong Jongjit	21	20	10

Final
1	(Japan) Takeshi Kamura (Japan) Keigo Sonoda	21	21
(Japan) Hiroyuki Endo (Japan) Yuta Watanabe	17	19

=== Top half ===
==== Section 1 ====
First Round
1	(Japan) T Kamura (Japan) K Sonoda	11
(Indonesia) S K Gutama (Indonesia) F W Putra	8^{r}
(Indonesia) A B Cahyono (Indonesia) M R P Isfahani	21	21
(Thailand) T Isriyanet (Thailand) K Namdash	18	15
5	(Chinese Taipei) Liao M-c (Chinese Taipei) Su C-h	21	21
(India) T Kona (India) S Sharma	6	6
Q2	(Hong Kong) Chung Y (Hong Kong) Tam C H	14	21	21
Q1	(India) M A Raju (India) V G Prasad	21	12	14

Second Round
1	(Japan) T Kamura (Japan) K Sonoda	21	21
(Indonesia) A B Cahyono (Indonesia) M R P Isfahani	14	13
5	(Chinese Taipei) Liao M-c (Chinese Taipei) Su C-h	19	21	21
Q2	(Hong Kong) Chung Y (Hong Kong) Tam C H	21	18	18

Quarter-finals
1	(Japan) T Kamura (Japan) K Sonoda	21	21
5	(Chinese Taipei) Liao M-c (Chinese Taipei) Su C-h	19	13

==== Section 2 ====
First Round
3	(Japan) T Inoue (Japan) Y Kaneko	21	21
(Thailand) I Apisuk (Thailand) T Viriyangkura	13	14
PFQ	(Chinese Taipei) Po L-w (Chinese Taipei) Yang M-t	17	9
(Canada) J Ho-shue (Canada) N Yakura	21	21
6	(Chinese Taipei) Lu C-y (Chinese Taipei) Yang P-h	21	21
(England) B Lane (England) S Vendy	11	10
(India) Arjun M.R. (India) R Shlok	18	21	16
(Indonesia) W Nayaka (Indonesia) A Yusuf	21	13	21

Second Round
3	(Japan) T Inoue (Japan) Y Kaneko	21	21
(Canada) J Ho-shue (Canada) N Yakura	13	18
6	(Chinese Taipei) Lu C-y (Chinese Taipei) Yang P-h	17	15
(Indonesia) W Nayaka (Indonesia) A Yusuf	21	21

Quarter-finals
3	(Japan) T Inoue (Japan) Y Kaneko	21	25
(Indonesia) W Nayaka (Indonesia) A Yusuf	11	23

=== Bottom half ===
==== Section 3 ====
First Round
(United States) P Chew (United States) R Chew	18	14
Q3	(China) Ou XY (China) Ren XY	21	21
(China) Han CK (China) Zhou HD	21	21
7	(Japan) T Hoki (Japan) Y Kobayashi	17	19
PFQ	(France) T Gicquel (France) B Kersaudy	10	7
(Japan) H Endo (Japan) Y Watanabe	21	21
(India) M Attri (India) B. S Reddy	21	15	21
4	(Chinese Taipei) Chen H-l (Chinese Taipei) Wang C-l	18	21	17

Second Round
Q3	(China) Ou XY (China) Ren XY	21	21
(China) Han CK (China) Zhou HD	17	13
(Japan) H Endo (Japan) Y Watanabe	22	21	21
(India) M Attri (India) B. S Reddy	24	13	19

Quarter-finals
Q3	(China) Ou XY (China) Ren XY	18	14
(Japan) H Endo (Japan) Y Watanabe	21	21

==== Section 4 ====
First Round
Q4	(Indonesia) R Swastedian (Indonesia) A Syahnawi	16	21	17
(Thailand) N Phuangphuapet (Thailand) N Yordphaisong	21	14	21
(Thailand) B Isara (Thailand) M Jongjit	21	21
8	(India) S Rankireddy (India) C Shetty	11	15
PFQ	(Thailand) P Kuna-Anuvit (Thailand) N Trinkajee	16	16
(Malaysia) A Chia (Malaysia) Soh W Y	21	21
(England) P Briggs (England) T Wolfenden	13	16
2	(Chinese Taipei) Lee J-h (Chinese Taipei) Lee Y	21	21

Second Round
(Thailand) N Phuangphuapet (Thailand) N Yordphaisong	21	16	19
(Thailand) B Isara (Thailand) M Jongjit	17	21	21
(Malaysia) A Chia (Malaysia) Soh W Y	21	13	21
2	(Chinese Taipei) Lee J-h (Chinese Taipei) Lee Y	18	21	19

Quarter-finals
(Thailand) B Isara (Thailand) M Jongjit	21	21
(Malaysia) A Chia (Malaysia) Soh W Y	14	12

== Women's doubles ==
=== Seeds ===
1. (Japan) Yuki Fukushima / Sayaka Hirota (quarter-finals)
2. (Japan) Shiho Tanaka / Koharu Yonemoto (semi-finals)
3. (Japan) Misaki Matsutomo / Ayaka Takahashi (final)
4. (Indonesia) Greysia Polii / Apriyani Rahayu (champions)
5. (Thailand) Jongkolphan Kititharakul / Rawinda Prajongjai (semi-finals)
6. (Bulgaria) Gabriela Stoeva / Stefani Stoeva (second round)
7. (Japan) Mayu Matsumoto / Wakana Nagahara (quarter-finals)
8. (Japan) Naoko Fukuman / Kurumi Yonao (quarter-finals)

=== Finals ===
Semi-finals
5	(Thailand) Jongkolphan Kititharakul (Thailand) Rawinda Prajongjai	16	19
3	(Japan) Misaki Matsutomo (Japan) Ayaka Takahashi	21	21
4	(Indonesia) Greysia Polii (Indonesia) Apriyani Rahayu	21	21
2	(Japan) Shiho Tanaka (Japan) Koharu Yonemoto	15	18

Final
3	(Japan) Misaki Matsutomo (Japan) Ayaka Takahashi	13	10
4	(Indonesia) Greysia Polii (Indonesia) Apriyani Rahayu	21	21

=== Top half ===
==== Section 1 ====
First Round
1	(Japan) Y Fukushima (Japan) S Hirota	21	21
PFQ	(Thailand) B Aimsaard (Thailand) N Aimsaard	10	10
(England) C Birch (England) J Moore	21	21
(Hong Kong) Ng T Y (Hong Kong) Yuen S Y	19	19
5	(Thailand) J Kititharakul (Thailand) R Prajongjai	21	21
(China) Tang JH (China) Yu XH	13	16
(Chinese Taipei) Chen H-h (Chinese Taipei) Hu L-f	23	21
(India) M Jakkampudi (India) P S. Ram	21	8

Second Round
1	(Japan) Y Fukushima (Japan) S Hirota	21	21
(England) C Birch (England) J Moore	11	14
5	(Thailand) J Kititharakul (Thailand) R Prajongjai	21	21
(Chinese Taipei) Chen H-h (Chinese Taipei) Hu L-f	10	17

Quarter-finals
1	(Japan) Y Fukushima (Japan) S Hirota	13	21	12
5	(Thailand) J Kititharakul (Thailand) R Prajongjai	21	14	21

==== Section 2 ====
First Round
3	(Japan) M Matsutomo (Japan) A Takahashi	21	21
(Thailand) S Paewsampran (Thailand) P Supajirakul	13	16
PFQ	(China) Dong WJ (China) Feng XY	18	15
(England) J Pugh (England) L Smith	21	21
8	(Japan) N Fukuman (Japan) K Yonao	21	21
Q2	(Thailand) R Iamratanamaetheekul (Thailand) T Thamnopakao	10	15
(Chinese Taipei) Hsu Y-c (Chinese Taipei) Wu T-j	21	21
Q4	(Thailand) P Sukjai (Thailand) R Sukjai	8	8

Second Round
3	(Japan) M Matsutomo (Japan) A Takahashi	21	21
(England) J Pugh (England) L Smith	15	14
8	(Japan) N Fukuman (Japan) K Yonao	12	21	21
(Chinese Taipei) Hsu Y-c (Chinese Taipei) Wu T-j	21	17	14

Quarter-finals
3	(Japan) M Matsutomo (Japan) A Takahashi	21	21
8	(Japan) N Fukuman (Japan) K Yonao	11	10

=== Bottom half ===
==== Section 3 ====
First Round
(United States) A Lee (United States) S Lee	7	7
PFQ	(Indonesia) N K M Istarani (Indonesia) N K Maheswari	21	21
(Indonesia) Y Barkah (Indonesia) R E Putri Sari	5	21	15
6	(Bulgaria) G Stoeva (Bulgaria) S Stoeva	21	18	21
(France) É Lefel (France) A Tran	21	21
(Russia) E Bolotova (Russia) A Davletova	16	17
(Hong Kong) Ng W Y (Hong Kong) Yeung N T	14	14
4	(Indonesia) G Polii (Indonesia) A Rahayu	21	21

Second Round
PFQ	(Indonesia) N K M Istarani (Indonesia) N K Maheswari	21	21
6	(Bulgaria) G Stoeva (Bulgaria) S Stoeva	15	13
(France) É Lefel (France) A Tran	9	9
4	(Indonesia) G Polii (Indonesia) A Rahayu	21	21

Quarter-finals
PFQ	(Indonesia) N K M Istarani (Indonesia) N K Maheswari	4^{r}
4	(Indonesia) G Polii (Indonesia) A Rahayu	12

==== Section 4 ====
First Round
(China) Cao TW (China) Zheng Y	21	21
(Thailand) R Laisuan (Thailand) S Mingchua	13	14
(Thailand) C Chaladchalam (Thailand) P Muenwong	12	8
7	(Japan) M Matsumoto (Japan) W Nagahara	21	21
(Thailand) S Amitrapai (Thailand) P Chochuwong	21	23
Q3	(Malaysia) Lim C S (Malaysia) Tan S J	13	21
Q1	(Indonesia) M C Bandaso (Indonesia) W O Kandow	11	15
2	(Japan) S Tanaka (Japan) K Yonemoto	21	21

Second Round
(China) Cao TW (China) Zheng Y	18	14
7	(Japan) M Matsumoto (Japan) W Nagahara	21	21
(Thailand) S Amitrapai (Thailand) P Chochuwong	6	5^{r}
2	(Japan) S Tanaka (Japan) K Yonemoto	21	11

Quarter-finals
7	(Japan) M Matsumoto (Japan) W Nagahara	21	19
2	(Japan) S Tanaka (Japan) K Yonemoto	23	21

== Mixed doubles ==
=== Seeds ===
1. (England) Chris Adcock / Gabrielle Adcock (final)
2. (Malaysia) Tan Kian Meng / Lai Pei Jing (first round)
3. (Chinese Taipei) Wang Chi-lin / Lee Chia-hsin (semi-finals)
4. (England) Marcus Ellis / Lauren Smith (second round)
5. (Indonesia) Praveen Jordan / Melati Daeva Oktavianti (quarter-finals)
6. (Malaysia) Chan Peng Soon / Goh Liu Ying (withdrew)
7. (Thailand) Dechapol Puavaranukroh / Sapsiree Taerattanachai (quarter-finals)
8. (Indonesia) Hafiz Faizal / Gloria Emanuelle Widjaja (champions)

=== Finals ===
Semi-finals
1	(England) Chris Adcock (England) Gabrielle Adcock	21	19	21
3	(Chinese Taipei) Wang Chi-lin (Chinese Taipei) Lee Chia-hsin	16	21	7
8	(Indonesia) Hafiz Faizal (Indonesia) Gloria Emanuelle Widjaja	21	21
(China) Lu Kai (China) Chen Lu	15	16

Final
1	(England) Chris Adcock (England) Gabrielle Adcock	12	12
8	(Indonesia) Hafiz Faizal (Indonesia) Gloria Emanuelle Widjaja	21	21

=== Top half ===
==== Section 1 ====
First Round
1	(England) C Adcock (England) G Adcock	21	21
Q4	(Indonesia) A Ramadiansyah (Indonesia) M C Bandaso	14	14
(Thailand) N Phuangphuapet (Thailand) S Amitrapai	17	17
(Indonesia) R Karanda Suwardi (Indonesia) D Susanto	21	21
5	(Indonesia) P Jordan (Indonesia) M D Oktavianti	21	21
(Japan) T Hoki (Japan) K Yonemoto	15	15
(Hong Kong) Chang T C (Hong Kong) Ng W Y	21	24
(Chinese Taipei) Liao M-c (Chinese Taipei) Chen H-h	17	22

Second Round
1	(England) C Adcock (England) G Adcock	21	22
(Indonesia) R Karanda Suwardi (Indonesia) D Susanto	9	20
5	(Indonesia) P Jordan (Indonesia) M D Oktavianti	22	21
(Hong Kong) Chang T C (Hong Kong) Ng W Y	20	15

Quarter-finals
1	(England) C Adcock (England) G Adcock	21	18	21
5	(Indonesia) P Jordan (Indonesia) M D Oktavianti	18	21	18

==== Section 2 ====
First Round
3	(Chinese Taipei) Wang C-l (Chinese Taipei) Lee C-h	21	21
(Thailand) T Isriyanet (Thailand) P Chochuwong	18	13
(Japan) Y Kobayashi (Japan) M Matsutomo	21	21
(Indonesia) R Widianto (Indonesia) M Mahmudin	16	19
PFQ	(Indonesia) A B Cahyono (Indonesia) W O Kandow	21	14	17
(India) S Rankireddy (India) A Ponnappa	19	21	21
Q3	(Japan) Y Kaneko (Japan) M Matsumoto	22	21
(England) G Mairs (England) J Moore	20	18

Second Round
3	(Chinese Taipei) Wang C-l (Chinese Taipei) Lee C-h	21	21
(Japan) Y Kobayashi (Japan) M Matsutomo	16	15
(India) S Rankireddy (India) A Ponnappa	11	16
Q3	(Japan) Y Kaneko (Japan) M Matsumoto	21	21

Quarter-finals
3	(Chinese Taipei) Wang C-l (Chinese Taipei) Lee C-h	21	21
Q3	(Japan) Y Kaneko (Japan) M Matsumoto	14	17

=== Bottom half ===
==== Section 3 ====
First Round
(England) B Lane (England) J Pugh	18	21	21
(Indonesia) Y E Saputra (Indonesia) M G Islami	21	19	10
PFQ	(Germany) P Käsbauer (Germany) O Konon	14	21
8	(Indonesia) H Faizal (Indonesia) G E Widjaja	21	23
(Russia) R Alimov (Russia) A Davletova	15	12
(China) Ren XY (China) Tang JH	21	21
Q1	(Indonesia) I Fadhilah (Indonesia) P Z Bernadeth	11	11
4	(England) M Ellis (England) L Smith	21	21

Second Round
(England) B Lane (England) J Pugh	13	18
8	(Indonesia) H Faizal (Indonesia) G E Widjaja	21	21
(China) Ren XY (China) Tang JH	21	16	21
4	(England) M Ellis (England) L Smith	16	21	17

Quarter-finals
8	(Indonesia) H Faizal (Indonesia) G E Widjaja	21	21
(China) Ren XY (China) Tang JH	14	15

==== Section 4 ====
First Round
Q2	(Hong Kong) Mak H C (Hong Kong) Yeung N T	21	21
(India) S Sharma (India) A Parikh	19	15
(Chinese Taipei) Lee Y (Chinese Taipei) Hsu Y-c	21	10	17
7	(Thailand) D Puavaranukroh (Thailand) S Taerattanachai	19	21	21
(Japan) Y Watanabe (Japan) A Higashino	21	20	16
(China) Lu K (China) Chen L	18	22	21
(Chinese Taipei) Lu C-y (Chinese Taipei) Hu L-f	21	21
2	(Malaysia) Tan K M (Malaysia) Lai P J	14	19

Second Round
Q2	(Hong Kong) Mak H C (Hong Kong) Yeung N T	17	13
7	(Thailand) D Puavaranukroh (Thailand) S Taerattanachai	21	21
(China) Lu K (China) Chen L	21	21
(Chinese Taipei) Lu C-y (Chinese Taipei) Hu L-f	17	18

Quarter-finals
7	(Thailand) D Puavaranukroh (Thailand) S Taerattanachai	10	21	13
(China) Lu K (China) Chen L	21	18	21

Preceded by 2018 Indonesia Open	BWF World Tour; 2018 BWF season	Succeeded by 2018 Singapore Open
