= Apriyani Rahayu =

Indonesian badminton player (born 1998)

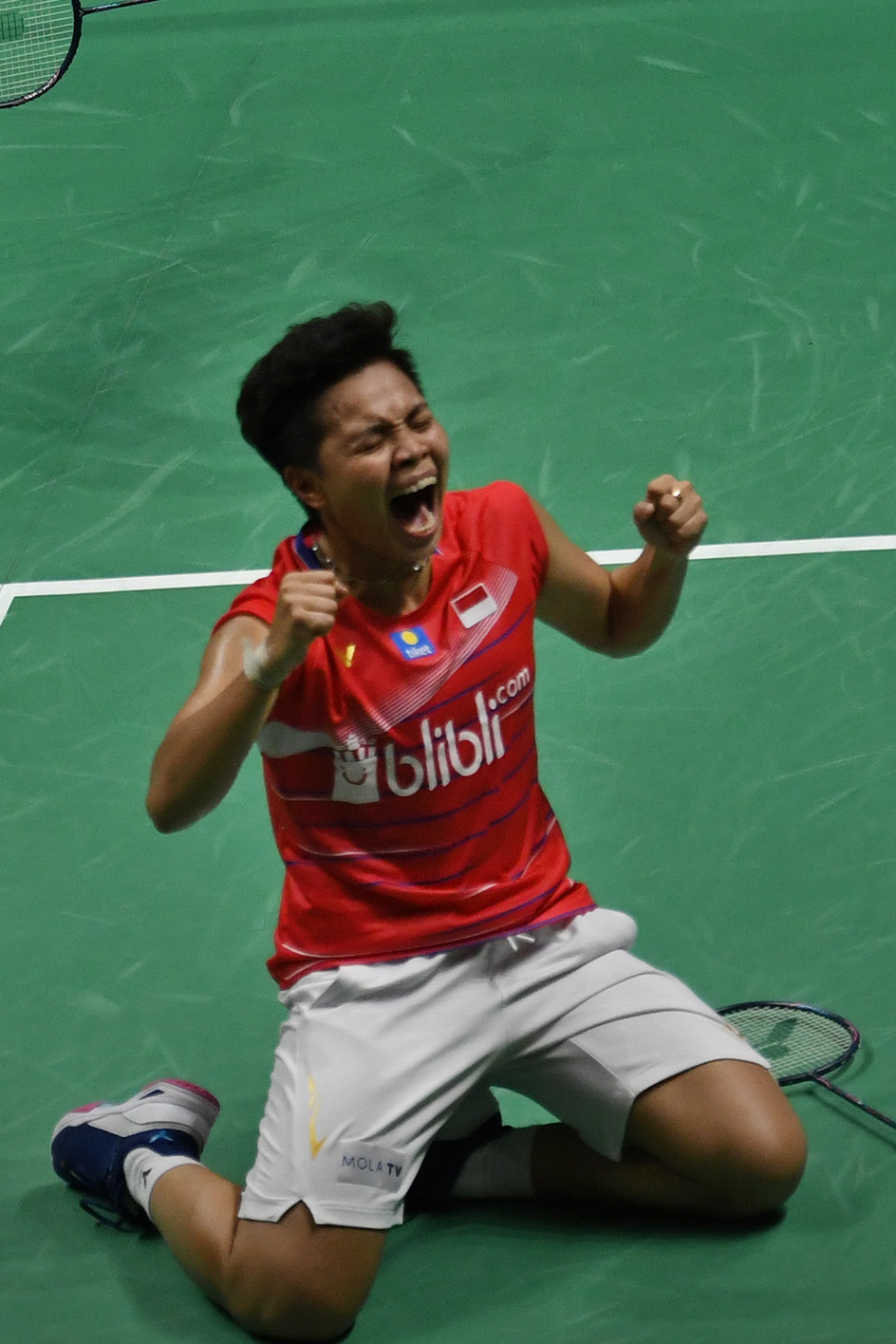
- Rahayu at the 2020 Indonesia Masters

Personal information
- Born: 29 April 1998 (age 28) Konawe, Southeast Sulawesi, Indonesia
- Height: 1.63 m (5 ft 4 in)
- Weight: 60 kg (132 lb)

Sport
- Country: Indonesia
- Sport: Badminton
- Handedness: Right
- Coached by: Karel Mainaky; Nitya Krishinda Maheswari

Women's & mixed doubles
- Highest ranking: 3 (WD with Greysia Polii, 20 September 2018); 4 (WD with Siti Fadia Silva Ramadhanti, 18 April 2023); 69 (WD with Febi Setianingrum, 5 August 2025); 100 (XD with Panji Akbar Sudrajat, 21 January 2016)
- Current ranking: 50 (WD with Siti Fadia Silva Ramadhanti); 80 (WD with Febi Setianingrum); 116 (WD with Lanny Tria Mayasari); (3 March 2026)
- BWF profile
Medal record
Women's badminton
Representing Indonesia
Olympic Games
Gold medal – first place	2020 Tokyo	Women's doubles
World Championships
Silver medal – second place	2023 Copenhagen	Women's doubles
Bronze medal – third place	2018 Nanjing	Women's doubles
Bronze medal – third place	2019 Basel	Women's doubles
Sudirman Cup
Bronze medal – third place	2019 Nanning	Mixed team
Uber Cup
Silver medal – second place	2024 Chengdu	Women's team
Asian Games
Bronze medal – third place	2018 Jakarta–Palembang	Women's doubles
Bronze medal – third place	2018 Jakarta–Palembang	Women's team
Asia Team Championships
Bronze medal – third place	2018 Alor Setar	Women's team
SEA Games
Gold medal – first place	2019 Philippines	Women's doubles
Gold medal – first place	2021 Vietnam	Women's doubles
Silver medal – second place	2019 Philippines	Women's team
Silver medal – second place	2021 Vietnam	Women's team
Bronze medal – third place	2017 Kuala Lumpur	Women's team
World Junior Championships
Silver medal – second place	2014 Alor Setar	Girls' doubles
Silver medal – second place	2014 Alor Setar	Mixed team
Silver medal – second place	2015 Lima	Mixed team
Bronze medal – third place	2015 Lima	Mixed doubles
Asian Junior Championships
Bronze medal – third place	2015 Bangkok	Mixed doubles
Bronze medal – third place	2015 Bangkok	Mixed team
Bronze medal – third place	2016 Bangkok	Mixed doubles

Apriyani Rahayu (born 29 April 1998) is an Indonesian badminton player specializing in doubles. She and Greysia Polii won the gold medal at the 2020 Summer Olympics champions in the women's doubles. She won gold at the 2019 SEA Games, and two bronze medals at the World Championships in 2018 and 2019. Rahayu also won bronze medals at the 2018 Asian Games in the women's team and doubles with her former partner Polii.

With her current partner, Siti Fadia Silva Ramadhanti, Rahayu won the silver medal at the 2023 World Championships, and a gold at the 2021 SEA Games.

== Early life ==
Apriyani Rahayu was born in Lawulo village, a remote settlement in Konawe Regency, Southeast Sulawesi. She is the youngest child of an agricultural worker named Ameruddin Pora and his wife, Sitti Jauhar. As a child Rahayu would fight with neighborhood boys, and her father encouraged her to devote her energy to badminton instead, which she agreed to. According to Rahayu's cousin, her father served as her trainer, with a training regimen including running 10 kilometers to competitions and practicing on a homemade court behind his house lined with areca nut trees. Pora was self-sufficient but poor. Rahayu used a homemade wooden racquet with fishing line for string, until her father was able to sell enough vegetables to buy a real racquet. However, Pora himself credits Rahayu's mother as providing her with support and training. Sitti Jauhar was an enthusiastic player of badminton, table tennis and volleyball and encouraged Rahayu to be tough and competitive. In 2007, at the age of 9, she represented Konawe Regency in a regional competition. In 2011, at the age of 13, she was scouted by Yuslan Kisra who brought her in contact with Icuk Sugiarto who recruited her to his club PB Pelita Bakri (now ISTC) and later on PB Jaya Raya Jakarta for international level play. Sitti Jauhar died in 2015 while Apriyani was at a championship in Peru, but she played through after hearing the news, winning two medals.

== Career ==
=== Junior career ===
Practiced at the Pelita Bakrie club, Rahayu was able to excel in national junior tournaments, so that she and her partner, Jauza Fadhila Sugiarto, were able to top the U17 girls' doubles national rankings in 2013. At the beginning of 2013, Rahayu was also called to train at the national training center, but the club had not given permission yet. In 2014, Rahayu and Sugiarto managed to win the Jaya Raya Junior International tournament in August. Then at the World Junior Championships, she won the silver medal partnering Rosyita Eka Putri Sari.

In 2015, Rahayu won the bronze medals in the Asian and World Junior Championships in the mixed doubles event partnered with Fachryza Abimanyu. At the age of 17, Rahayu also managed to win the women's doubles international senior title in Singapore with Sugiarto, and finished as mixed doubles runner-up in the Indonesia International Series with Panji Akbar Sudrajat.

In 2016, Rahayu who was paired with Rinov Rivaldy in the mixed doubles won the bronze medal at the Asian Junior Championships. They then clinched a Junior Grand Prix title in the Jaya Raya Junior International tournament. At the Indonesia International Series in Surabaya, Rahayu claimed double title by winning the mixed and women's doubles event.

=== 2017: French Open and Thailand Open title ===
In May, Rahayu partnered with her senior and mentor Greysia Polii, and they competed as a new pair at the Sudirman Cup in Gold Coast, Australia. Even though they had only been paired for about a month, the duo won their first title in the Thailand Open after defeating the home pair Chayanit Chaladchalam and Phataimas Muenwong in straight games 21–12, 21–12 in the final. They also won the Superseries title at the French Open, just five months into their partnership. Other achievements by Polii and Rahayu in 2017 were runner-up in Hong Kong, semi-finalists in New Zealand, and quarter-finalists in Korea Open. Rahayu also helped the Indonesia women's team win the bronze medal at the SEA Games held in Kuala Lumpur, In the individual women's doubles event, she and Polii lost in the first round to eventual champion Jongkolphan Kititharakul and Rawinda Prajongjai of Thailand. The Polii and Rahayu partnership, first paired in May, reached a career high as world number 10 in the BWF World rankings in November.

=== 2018: India Open and third Thailand Open title ===
In January, Rahayu and Polii began the season by finishing as runners-up in the Indonesia Masters, losing to second seeded Misaki Matsutomo and Ayaka Takahashi in the final. A month later, the duo played as the third seeds in the India Open and won the title after beating the first-seeded Christinna Pedersen and Kamilla Rytter Juhl in the semi-finals, and the second-seeded Jongkolphan Kititharakul and Rawinda Prajongjai in the final. She featured in the Indonesian women's team that won bronze at the Asia Team Championships held in Alor Setar and were quarter-finalists in the Uber Cup in Bangkok. In July, she and her partner lost in the quarter-finals of the Indonesia Open to Yuki Fukushima and Sayaka Hirota, but a week later, she won her second Thailand Open title, as she and Polii defended the title they had won in Thailand the previous year, when the event was known as the Grand Prix. In August, Rahayu and Polii won the bronze medal at the World Championships in Nanjing, and further bronze medals at the Asian Games in the women's doubles and team events. In the remainder of the 2018 tour, she and Polii only reached the semi-finals in Japan, China, Denmark, French, Hong Kong, and quarter-finals in the Fuzhou China Open. The duo achieved their career high as world number 3 in the BWF rankings in September.

=== 2019: Second India Open title, first SEA Games gold ===
Rahayu opened the 2019 season as a finalist in the Malaysia Masters with Polii. In the semi-finals, they beat their arch-rivals Misaki Matsutomo and Ayaka Takahashi in a close rubber game, improving their head-to-head record against the Japanese pair to 2–8. A week later, they again lost to Matsutomo and Takahashi in the Indonesia Masters. They led 18–10 in the first game, but lost it 20–22, eventually losing the match in a close rubber game. In March, she and Polii lost in the quarter-finals of both the German and All England Open. Polii and Rahayu then clinched their second India Open title defeating Chow Mei Kuan and Lee Meng Yean in the final. In May, she alongside the Indonesia team finished as semi-finalists in the Sudirman Cup in Nanning, settling for the bronze medal. In June, she and Polii advanced to the semi-finals of the Australian Open after beating the first seeded, world number one Mayu Matsumoto and Wakana Nagahara in the quarter-finals, but the duo were beaten by Chinese pair Chen Qingchen and Jia Yifan, the fifth defeat in seven meetings between them. At the World Championships in Basel, Switzerland, she and her partner won the bronze medal, after defeat in the semi-finals to eventual champions Matsumoto and Nagahara. After the World Championships, her coach, Eng Hian, evaluated that she and Rahayu had fallen short of their previous standard. In the end of 2019 season, their best results were only the semi-finalists in Chinese Taipei Open, after that, they often lost in the initial stage. She finally won her first women's doubles gold medal at the SEA Games. She and Polii defeated Chayanit Chaladchalam and Phataimas Muenwong of Thailand 21–3, 21–18.

=== 2020: Home soil title ===
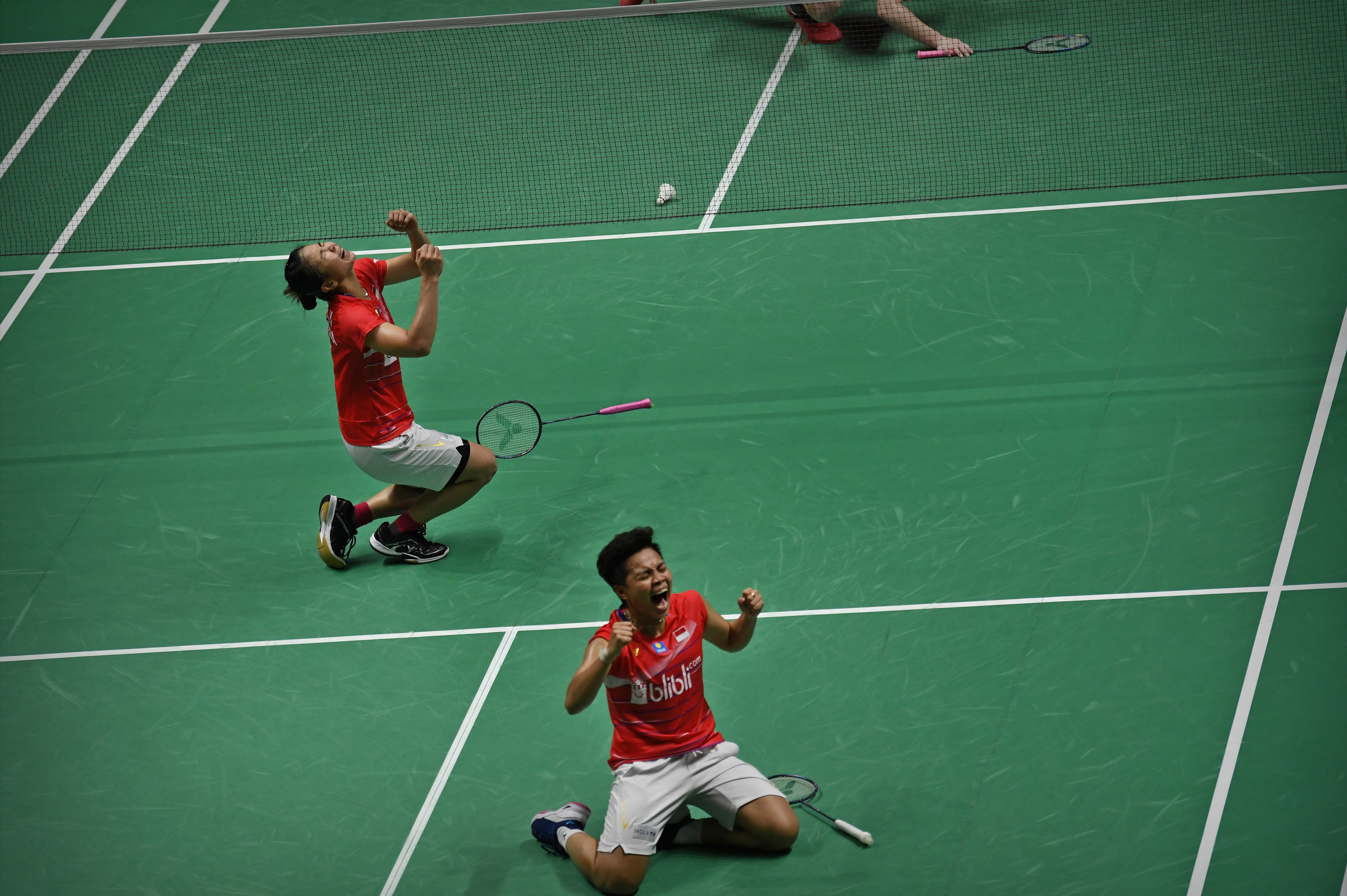
Polii and Apriyani Rahayu celebrates after winning 2020 Indonesia Masters

In 2020, Rahayu and Polii who ranked as world number eight started their tour in the Malaysia Masters. At that tournament, they finished as semi-finalists defeated by Chinese pair Li Wenmei and Zheng Yu in a rubber game. A week later in the Indonesia Masters, Rahayu won her first ever international title in Indonesia, after she and Polii triumphed in a thrilling match against Maiken Fruergaard and Sara Thygesen of Denmark. In February, she won her second title of the year by winning the Barcelona Spain Masters. In the final, she and Polii defeated Gabriela and Stefani Stoeva of Bulgaria in a rubber game. In March All England Open, she and her partner lost in the first round to Korean pair Chang Ye-na and Kim Hye-rin in straight games. Due to the COVID-19 pandemic, numerous tournaments on the 2020 BWF World Tour were either cancelled or rescheduled for later in the year.

=== 2021–2022: Olympic Games gold medal and new partner ===
Rahayu returned in the international competitions at the 2020 Asian Leg tournament in January 2021. Together with Polii, she won her first ever BWF Super 1000 tournament, the Yonex Thailand Open. A week later in the semi-finals of the Toyota Thailand Open, Rahayu and Polii fell in two games to Lee So-hee and Shin Seung-chan of South Korea. The duo then played at the World Tour Finals, but was eliminated in the group stage.

In March 2021, Rahayu scheduled to participating at the All England Open, but later Indonesia team were forced to withdraw from the competition by BWF after the team members will self-isolate for 10 days from the date of their inbound flight after an anonym person traveling onboard tested positive for COVID-19.

On 2 August 2021, at the Tokyo 2020 Olympics she partnered with Greysia Polii in the women's doubles. In the finals they defeated 2017 world champion Chen Qingchen and Jia Yifan. They became the first unseeded pair to win the gold medal in women's doubles. This was Indonesia's first Olympic gold in women's doubles. She and Polii are the third and fourth Indonesian women to win Olympic gold after Susi Susanti in 1992 and Liliyana Natsir in 2016. Rahayu and Polii's win made Indonesia the only country outside of China to have won gold medals in all five disciplines of Badminton at the Summer Olympics. After her Olympic success, the Student Sports Training Center in Jakarta was named after her and Greysia Polii.

In September–October 2021, Rahayu alongside the Indonesian team competed at the 2021 Sudirman Cup in Vantaa, Finland. She played two match in the group stage against Canada and Denmark. Indonesia advanced to the knockout stage but lost at the quarterfinals against Malaysia. In November 2021, Rahayu and Polii lost the finals of the 2021 Indonesia Open.

In May 2022, at the 2021 SEA Games, she started her journey with new partner, Siti Fadia Silva Ramadhanti. The duo clinched the gold medal in the women's doubles after beating the Thai pair of Benyapa Aimsaard and Nuntakarn Aimsaard in the final. This new pair immediately showed satisfying results, by winning the Malaysia and Singapore Opens, and became finalists in the Indonesia Masters.

=== 2023: World Champions silver and first ever Indonesian women's doubles to win the Hong Kong Open ===
In the first half of 2023 season, Rahayu, who competed on the BWF Tour together with Siti Fadia Silva Ramadhanti, was unable to win a single title. Their best performance were reaching the semi-finals at the Malaysia Open in January, and at the Swiss Open in March. In both tournaments, they were unable to finish the match due to injury. In Malaysia, her partner, Ramadhanti suffered a right ankle injury; and then in Switzerland, Rahayu suffered a right shoulder injury. In addition, they became quarter-finalists in the Indonesia Masters, All England Open, Malaysia Masters, and at the Indonesia Open. The poor record experienced by Rahayu and Ramadhanti were when they lost in the early rounds at the Asian Championships in Dubai, to Thai pair Benyapa Aimsaard and Nuntakarn Aimsaard, in the Thailand and Singapore Opens to Rin Iwanaga and Kie Nakanishi. Rahayu also join national team to compete at the Asia Mixed Team Championships and Sudirman Cup, but the teams stopped in the quarter-finals to South Korea and China respectively. The Rahayu-Ramadhanti partnership then reached their career high as world number 4 in the BWF ranking which was released on 18 April 2023.

In August, Rahayu and Ramadhanti reached the final at the World Championships in Copenhagen. The duo won a silver medal after being defeated by 1st seed Chen Qingchen and Jia Yifan in straight games. The duo then won their first ever title of the year in the Hong Kong Open, and made a history as the first ever women's doubles from Indonesia to win the Hong Kong Open title since the inception in 1982. She then made her second appearance at the Asian Games in 2022 Hangzhou, but unable to win any medals in both women's doubles and team events. She suffered a right calf injury while competing in the individual event, and decided to retire from the competition.

=== 2024 ===
She was selected as a member of the Indonesian women's team at the Uber Cup in May, and made history by reaching the final at the Uber Cup since 2008. In the final Indonesia lost to China 0–3.

== Awards and nominations ==
Award	Year	Category	Result	Ref.
BWF Awards	2017	Eddy Choong Most Promising Player of the Year	Nominated	
BWF Awards	2018	Eddy Choong Most Promising Player of the Year	Nominated	
BWF Awards	2020/2021	Pair of The Year with Greysia Polii	Won	
Candra Wijaya International Badminton Centre Awards	2017	Sensational women's doubles with Greysia Polii	Honored	
Forbes	2021	30 Under 30 Indonesia (Sports)	Placed	
Forbes	2022	30 Under 30 Asia (Sports)	Placed	
Gatra Awards	2021	Sports Category with Greysia Polii	Won	
GTV Amazing Kids Favorite Awards	2023	Favorite Athlete	Nominated	
Indonesian Sport Awards	2018	Favorite Women's Doubles Athlete with Greysia Polii	Won	
Indonesian Sport Awards	2018	Favorite Women's Team with 2018 Asian Games women's badminton team	Won	
Line Today Choice	2021	Most Favorite Indonesian Athlete with Greysia Polii	Won	

== Achievements ==
=== Olympic Games ===
Women's doubles
Year	Venue	Partner	Opponent	Score	Result	Ref.
2020	Musashino Forest Sport Plaza; Tokyo, Japan	(Indonesia) Greysia Polii	(China) Chen Qingchen (China) Jia Yifan	21–19, 21–15	Gold	

=== World Championships ===
Women's doubles
Year	Venue	Partner	Opponent	Score	Result	Ref.
2018	Nanjing Youth Olympic Sports Park; Nanjing, China	(Indonesia) Greysia Polii	(Japan) Mayu Matsumoto (Japan) Wakana Nagahara	12–21, 21–23	Bronze	
2019	St. Jakobshalle; Basel, Switzerland	(Indonesia) Greysia Polii	(Japan) Mayu Matsumoto (Japan) Wakana Nagahara	12–21, 19–21	Bronze	
2023	Royal Arena; Copenhagen, Denmark	(Indonesia) Siti Fadia Silva Ramadhanti	(China) Chen Qingchen (China) Jia Yifan	16–21, 12–21	Silver	

=== Asian Games ===
Women's doubles
Year	Venue	Partner	Opponent	Score	Result	Ref.
2018	Istora Gelora Bung Karno; Jakarta, Indonesia	(Indonesia) Greysia Polii	(Japan) Misaki Matsutomo (Japan) Ayaka Takahashi	15–21, 17–21	Bronze	

=== SEA Games ===
Women's doubles
Year	Venue	Partner	Opponent	Score	Result	Ref.
2019	Muntinlupa Sports Complex; Metro Manila, Philippines	(Indonesia) Greysia Polii	(Thailand) Chayanit Chaladchalam (Thailand) Phataimas Muenwong	21–3, 21–18	Gold	
2021	Bac Giang Gymnasium; Bắc Giang, Vietnam	(Indonesia) Siti Fadia Silva Ramadhanti	(Thailand) Benyapa Aimsaard (Thailand) Nuntakarn Aimsaard	21–17, 21–14	Gold	

=== World Junior Championships ===
Girls' doubles
Year	Venue	Partner	Opponent	Score	Result	Ref.
2014	Stadium Sultan Abdul Halim; Alor Setar, Malaysia	(Indonesia) Rosyita Eka Putri Sari	(China) Chen Qingchen (China) Jia Yifan	11–21, 14–21	Silver	

Mixed doubles
Year	Venue	Partner	Opponent	Score	Result	Ref.
2015	Centro de Alto Rendimiento de la Videna; Lima, Peru	(Indonesia) Fachryza Abimanyu	(China) He Jiting (China) Du Yue	13–21, 10–21	Bronze	

=== Asian Junior Championships ===
Mixed doubles
Year	Venue	Partner	Opponent	Score	Result	Ref.
2015	CPB Badminton Training Center; Bangkok, Thailand	(Indonesia) Fachryza Abimanyu	(China) Zheng Siwei (China) Chen Qingchen	14–21, 14–21	Bronze	
2016	CPB Badminton Training Center; Bangkok, Thailand	(Indonesia) Rinov Rivaldy	(South Korea) Kim Won-ho (South Korea) Lee Yu-rim	17–21, 20–22	Bronze	

=== BWF World Tour (10 titles, 5 runners-up) ===
The BWF World Tour, which was announced on 19 March 2017 and implemented in 2018, is a series of elite badminton tournaments sanctioned by the Badminton World Federation (BWF). The BWF World Tour is divided into levels of World Tour Finals, Super 1000, Super 750, Super 500, Super 300, and the BWF Tour Super 100.

Women's doubles
Year	Tournament	Level	Partner	Opponent	Score	Result	Ref.
2018	Indonesia Masters	Super 500	(Indonesia) Greysia Polii	(Japan) Misaki Matsutomo (Japan) Ayaka Takahashi	17–21, 12–21	(silver) Runner-up	
2018	India Open	Super 500	(Indonesia) Greysia Polii	(Thailand) Jongkolphan Kititharakul (Thailand) Rawinda Prajongjai	21–18, 21–15	(gold) Winner	
2018	Thailand Open	Super 500	(Indonesia) Greysia Polii	(Japan) Misaki Matsutomo (Japan) Ayaka Takahashi	21–13, 21–10	(gold) Winner	
2019	Malaysia Masters	Super 500	(Indonesia) Greysia Polii	(Japan) Yuki Fukushima (Japan) Sayaka Hirota	21–18, 16–21, 16–21	(silver) Runner-up	
2019	India Open	Super 500	(Indonesia) Greysia Polii	(Malaysia) Chow Mei Kuan (Malaysia) Lee Meng Yean	21–11, 25–23	(gold) Winner	
2020	Indonesia Masters	Super 500	(Indonesia) Greysia Polii	(Denmark) Maiken Fruergaard (Denmark) Sara Thygesen	18–21, 21–11, 23–21	(gold) Winner	
2020	Spain Masters	Super 300	(Indonesia) Greysia Polii	(Bulgaria) Gabriela Stoeva (Bulgaria) Stefani Stoeva	18–21, 22–20, 21–17	(gold) Winner	
2020 (I)	Thailand Open	Super 1000	(Indonesia) Greysia Polii	(Thailand) Jongkolphan Kititharakul (Thailand) Rawinda Prajongjai	21–15, 21–12	(gold) Winner	
2021	Indonesia Open	Super 1000	(Indonesia) Greysia Polii	(Japan) Nami Matsuyama (Japan) Chiharu Shida	19–21, 19–21	(silver) Runner-up	
2022	Indonesia Masters	Super 500	(Indonesia) Siti Fadia Silva Ramadhanti	(China) Chen Qingchen (China) Jia Yifan	18–21, 12–21	(silver) Runner-up	
2022	Malaysia Open	Super 750	(Indonesia) Siti Fadia Silva Ramadhanti	(China) Zhang Shuxian (China) Zheng Yu	21–18, 12–21, 21–19	(gold) Winner	
2022	Singapore Open	Super 500	(Indonesia) Siti Fadia Silva Ramadhanti	(China) Zhang Shuxian (China) Zheng Yu	21–14, 21–17	(gold) Winner	
2023	Hong Kong Open	Super 500	(Indonesia) Siti Fadia Silva Ramadhanti	(Malaysia) Pearly Tan (Malaysia) Thinaah Muralitharan	14–21, 24–22, 21–9	(gold) Winner	
2023	Hylo Open	Super 300	(Indonesia) Siti Fadia Silva Ramadhanti	(China) Zhang Shuxian (China) Zheng Yu	21–18, 1^{r}–1	(silver) Runner-up	
2025 (II)	Indonesia Masters	Super 100	(Indonesia) Siti Fadia Silva Ramadhanti	(Indonesia) Isyana Syahira Meida (Indonesia) Rinjani Kwinnara Nastine	21–11, 21–17	(gold) Winner	

=== BWF Superseries (1 title, 1 runner-up) ===
The BWF Superseries, which was launched on 14 December 2006 and implemented in 2007, was a series of elite badminton tournaments, sanctioned by the Badminton World Federation (BWF). BWF Superseries levels were Superseries and Superseries Premier. A season of Superseries consisted of twelve tournaments around the world that had been introduced since 2011. Successful players were invited to the Superseries Finals, which were held at the end of each year.

Women's doubles
Year	Tournament	Partner	Opponent	Score	Result	Ref.
2017	French Open	(Indonesia) Greysia Polii	(South Korea) Lee So-hee (South Korea) Shin Seung-chan	21–17, 21–15	(gold) Winner	
2017	Hong Kong Open	(Indonesia) Greysia Polii	(China) Chen Qingchen (China) Jia Yifan	21–14, 16–21, 15–21	(silver) Runner-up	

BWF Super Series Finals tournament
BWF Super Series Premier tournament
BWF Super Series tournament

=== BWF Grand Prix (1 title) ===
The BWF Grand Prix had two levels, the Grand Prix and Grand Prix Gold. It was a series of badminton tournaments sanctioned by the Badminton World Federation (BWF) and played between 2007 and 2017.

Women's doubles
Year	Tournament	Partner	Opponent	Score	Result	Ref.
2017	Thailand Open	(Indonesia) Greysia Polii	(Thailand) Chayanit Chaladchalam (Thailand) Phataimas Muenwong	21–12, 21–12	(gold) Winner	

BWF Grand Prix Gold tournament
BWF Grand Prix tournament

=== BWF International Challenge/Series (4 titles, 2 runners-up) ===
Women's doubles
Year	Tournament	Partner	Opponent	Score	Result	Ref.
2015	Singapore International	(Indonesia) Jauza Fadhila Sugiarto	(Indonesia) Melvira Oklamona (Indonesia) Rika Rositawati	22–20, 16–21, 21–10	(gold) Winner	
2016	Indonesia International	(Indonesia) Jauza Fadhila Sugiarto	(Indonesia) Dian Fitriani (Indonesia) Nadya Melati	12–21, 21–18, 22–20	(gold) Winner	

Mixed doubles
Year	Tournament	Partner	Opponent	Score	Result	Ref.
2015	Indonesia International	(Indonesia) Panji Akbar Sudrajat	(Indonesia) Irfan Fadhilah (Indonesia) Weni Anggraini	16–21, 16–21	(silver) Runner-up	
2016	Indonesia International	(Indonesia) Agripina Prima Rahmanto Putra	(Indonesia) Yantoni Edy Saputra (Indonesia) Marsheilla Gischa Islami	21–12, 21–12	(gold) Winner	
2026 (I)	Indonesia International	(Indonesia) Dejan Ferdinansyah	(Chinese Taipei) Lin Sheng-ming (Chinese Taipei) Liang Ching-sun	19–21, 27–25, 21–19	(gold) Winner	
2026 (II)	Indonesia International	(Indonesia) Bagas Maulana	(Indonesia) Rehan Naufal Kusharjanto (Indonesia) Melati Daeva Oktavianti	19–21, 15–21	(silver) Runner-up	

BWF International Challenge tournament
BWF International Series tournament

=== BWF Junior International (2 titles) ===
Girls' doubles
Year	Tournament	Partner	Opponent	Score	Result	Ref.
2014	Indonesia Junior International	(Indonesia) Jauza Fadhila Sugiarto	(Indonesia) Yulfira Barkah (Indonesia) Dianita Saraswati	21–13, 21–18	(gold) Winner	

Mixed doubles
Year	Tournament	Partner	Opponent	Score	Result	Ref.
2016	Indonesia Junior International	(Indonesia) Rinov Rivaldy	(Indonesia) Andika Ramadiansyah (Indonesia) Vania Arianti Sukoco	21–15, 21–15	(gold) Winner	

BWF Junior International Grand Prix tournament
BWF Junior International Challenge tournament
BWF Junior International Series tournament
BWF Junior Future Series tournament

== Performance timeline ==
Key

W	Won	F	Finalist	SF	Semi-finalist
QF	Quarter-finalist	#R	Rounds 4, 3, 2, 1	RR	Round-robin stage
Q#	Qualification round	A	Absent	w/d	Withdrew
G	Gold	S	Silver	B	Bronze
NH	Not held	N/A	Not applicable	DNQ	Did not qualify

=== National team ===
- Junior level

Team events	2014	2015	2016	Ref
Asian Junior Championships	QF	B	QF	
World Junior Championships	S	S	5th	

- Senior level

Team events	2017	2018	2019	2020	2021	2022	2023	2024	Ref
SEA Games	B	NH	S	NH	S	NH	A	NH	
Asia Team Championships	NH	B	NH	QF	NH	A	NH	A	
Asia Mixed Team Championships	A	NH	A	NH			QF	NH	
Asian Games	NH	B	NH			QF	NH		
Uber Cup	NH	QF	NH	QF	NH	A	NH	S	
Sudirman Cup	RR	NH	B	NH	QF	NH	QF	NH	

=== Individual competitions ===
==== Junior level ====
Girls' doubles

Event	2014	2015	2016	Ref
Asian Junior Championships	QF	3R	3R	
World Junior Championships	S	4R	4R	

Mixed doubles

Event	2014	2015	2016	Ref
Asian Junior Championships	3R	B	B	
World Junior Championships	A	B	QF	

==== Senior level ====
===== Women's doubles =====
Event	2017	2018	2019	2020	2021	2022	2023	2024	2025	Ref
SEA Games	1R	NH	G	NH	G	NH	A	NH	A	
Asian Championships	A	QF	1R	NH		A	1R	w/d	A	
Asian Games	NH	B	NH			2R	NH			
World Championships	DNQ	B	B	NH	w/d	A	S	NH	DNQ	
Olympic Games	NH			G	NH			RR	NH	

Tournament	BWF Superseries / Grand Prix					BWF World Tour									Best	Ref
Tournament	2013	2014	2015	2016	2017	2018	2019	2020	2021	2022	2023	2024	2025	2026	Best	Ref
Malaysia Open	A			1R	A		2R	NH		W	SF	w/d	A		W ('22)	
India Open	A					W	W	NH		A		w/d	A		W ('18, '19)	
Indonesia Masters	1R	2R	2R	A	NH	F	SF	W	QF	F	QF	1R	A	SF	W ('20)	
Thailand Masters	NH			2R	QF	A			NH		A			2R	QF ('17)	
German Open	A						QF	NH		A				2R	QF ('19)	
All England Open	A				2R	1R	QF	1R	2R	2R	QF	2R	2R	A	QF ('19, 23)	
Ruichang China Masters	A							NH			A			SF	SF ('26)	
Swiss Open	A				2R	A		NH	A	w/d	SF	SF	w/d	A	SF ('23, '24)	
Orléans Masters	NA					A		NH	A	w/d	A		QF	A	QF ('25)	
Thailand Open	A	NH	2R	w/d	W	W	QF	W	NH	A	2R	A	1R	1R	W ('17, '18, '20)	
Thailand Open	A	NH	2R	w/d	W	W	QF	SF	NH	A	2R	A	1R	1R	W ('17, '18, '20)	
Malaysia Masters	A		1R	A			F	SF	NH	QF	QF	A	SF	2R	F ('19)	
Singapore Open	A		1R	1R	A			NH		W	2R	QF	A		W ('22)	
Indonesia Open	A			2R	2R	QF	2R	NH	F	QF	QF	2R	2R	1R	F ('21)	
Australian Open	A						SF	NH		A	2R	A	QF	A	SF ('19)	
Macau Open	A							NH				A	QF	1R	QF ('25)	
Japan Open	A				2R	SF	QF	NH		QF	1R	A			SF ('18)	
China Open	A				1R	SF	QF	NH			QF	A			SF ('18)	
Taipei Open	A						SF	NH		w/d	A		2R	A	SF ('19)	
China Masters	A					QF	1R	NH			2R	A			QF ('18)	
Indonesia Masters Super 100	NH					A		NH		A	A				W ('25 II)	
Indonesia Masters Super 100	NH					A		NH		A	A		W		W ('25 II)	
Denmark Open	A				1R	SF	2R	A	QF	QF	w/d	A			SF ('18)	
French Open	A				W	SF	2R	NH	A	1R	SF	2R	A		W ('17)	
Hylo Open	A										F	A			F ('23)	
Korea Open	A				QF	w/d	2R	NH		A			2R	A	QF ('17)	
Japan Masters	NH										A		2R		2R ('25)	
Hong Kong Open	A				F	SF	w/d	NH			W	A	2R		W ('23)	
Syed Modi International	NH	A						NH		A			w/d		—	
Superseries / World Tour Finals	DNQ					RR	RR	RR	SF	RR	RR	DNQ			SF ('21)	
New Zealand Open	A				SF	A		NH							SF ('17)	
Spain Masters	NH					A		W	A	NH	w/d	A	NH		W ('20)	
Year-end ranking	431	212	77	58	11	4	8	8	6	11	6	30	48		3	
Tournament	2013	2014	2015	2016	2017	2018	2019	2020	2021	2022	2023	2024	2025	2026	Best	Ref

===== Mixed doubles =====
Tournament	BWF Superseries / Grand Prix					BWF World Tour									Best	Ref
Tournament	2013	2014	2015	2016	2017	2018	2019	2020	2021	2022	2023	2024	2025	2026	Best	Ref
Thailand Masters	NH			2R	A				NH		A				2R ('16)	
Indonesia Masters	Q1	1R	1R	A	NH	A		2R	A						2R ('20)	
Ruichang China Masters	A							NH			A			1R	1R ('26)	
Taipei Open	A							NH		A				1R	1R ('26)	
Indonesia Masters Super 100	NH					A		NH		A	A			SF	SF ('26 I)	
Indonesia Masters Super 100	NH					A		NH		A	A			2R	SF ('26 I)	
Malaysia Super 100	N/A										A			2R	2R ('26)	
Syed Modi International	NH	A						NH		A				Q	('26)	
Year-end ranking	1,170	387	100	316	—N/a	—N/a	—N/a	261	—N/a	—N/a	—N/a	—N/a	—N/a		100	
Tournament	2013	2014	2015	2016	2017	2018	2019	2020	2021	2022	2023	2024	2025	2026	Best	Ref

== Record against selected opponents ==
Record against year-end Finals finalists, World Championships semi-finalists, and Olympic quarter-finalists. Accurate as of 13 August 2024.

=== Greysia Polii ===
Players	M	W	L	Diff.
(Bulgaria) Gabriela Stoeva & Stefani Stoeva	5	4	1	+3
(China) Chen Qingchen & Jia Yifan	10	4	6	–2
(China) Du Yue & Li Yinhui	7	4	3	+1
(Denmark) Maiken Fruergaard & Sara Thygesen	9	9	0	+9
(Denmark) Christinna Pedersen & Kamilla Rytter Juhl	2	1	1	0
(Japan) Yuki Fukushima & Sayaka Hirota	11	3	8	–5
(Japan) Mayu Matsumoto & Wakana Nagahara	5	1	4	–3
(Japan) Misaki Matsutomo & Ayaka Takahashi	12	2	10	–8
(Japan) Nami Matsuyama & Chiharu Shida	4	2	2	0
(Japan) Shiho Tanaka & Koharu Yonemoto	4	3	1	+2
(Malaysia) Vivian Hoo & Woon Khe Wei	1	0	1	–1
(Malaysia) Pearly Tan & Thinaah Muralitharan	5	5	0	+5
(Netherlands) Selena Piek & Cheryl Seinen	1	1	0	+1
(South Korea) Chang Ye-na & Lee So-hee	1	0	1	–1
(South Korea) Kim So-yeong & Kong Hee-yong	4	1	3	–2
(South Korea) Lee So-hee & Shin Seung-chan	8	6	2	+4
(Thailand) Puttita Supajirakul & Sapsiree Taerattanachai	4	3	1	+2

=== Siti Fadia Silva Ramadhanti ===
Players	M	W	L	Diff.
(Bulgaria) Gabriela Stoeva & Stefani Stoeva	1	1	0	+1
(China) Chen Qingchen & Jia Yifan	9	1	8	–7 (Note: Tournament software did not included the women's team event of the 2022 Asian Games results for head-to-head (Rahayu and Ramadhanti lost to Chen and Jia 12–21, 21–19, 20–22).)
(China) Liu Shengshu & Tan Ning	2	0	2	–2
(China) Zhang Shuxian & Zheng Yu	5	3	2	+1
(Denmark) Maiken Fruergaard & Sara Thygesen	1	1	0	+1
(Japan) Yuki Fukushima & Sayaka Hirota	5	2	3	–1
(Japan) Mayu Matsumoto & Wakana Nagahara	3	2	1	+1
(Japan) Nami Matsuyama & Chiharu Shida	4	1	3	–2
(Malaysia) Pearly Tan & Thinaah Muralitharan	7	3	4	–1
(South Korea) Baek Ha-na & Lee So-hee	5	1	4	–3
(South Korea) Kim So-yeong & Kong Hee-yong	3	3	0	+3
(South Korea) Lee So-hee & Shin Seung-chan	2	1	1	0
(Thailand) Benyapa Aimsaard & Nuntakarn Aimsaard	3	1	2	–1
