= Marsheilla Gischa Islami =

Indonesian badminton player (born 1997)

Personal information
- Born: 25 March 1997 (age 29) Blitar, East Java, Indonesia
- Height: 1.71 m (5 ft 7 in)

Sport
- Country: Indonesia
- Sport: Badminton
- Handedness: Right

Mixed doubles
- Highest ranking: 23 (with Alfian Eko Prasetya 5 March 2019)
- Current ranking: 39 (with Akbar Bintang Cahyono 7 February 2023)
- BWF profile
Medal record
Women's badminton
Representing Indonesia
Asia Mixed Team Championships
| Bronze medal – third place | 2019 Hong Kong | Mixed team |
World Junior Championships
| Silver medal – second place | 2014 Alor Setar | Mixed team |
| Silver medal – second place | 2015 Lima | Mixed team |
Asian Junior Championships
| Bronze medal – third place | 2015 Bangkok | Mixed team |

Marsheilla Gischa Islami (born 25 March 1997) is an Indonesian badminton player affiliated with Djarum badminton club.

== Career ==
=== 2023 ===
In January, Islami and her partner Akbar Bintang Cahyono competed at the home tournament, Indonesia Masters, but had to lose in the qualifying round from junior Chinese pair Jiang Zhenbang and Wei Yaxin. In the next tournament, they lost in the quarter-finals of the Thailand Masters from Japanese pair Hiroki Midorikawa and Natsu Saito.

In March, Cahyono and Islami competed in the Swiss Open, but had to lose in the first round again from junior Chinese pair Jiang Zhenbang and Wei Yaxin. In the next tour, they competed in the Spain Masters, but had to lose in the first round from junior Danish pair Jesper Toft and Clara Graversen.

In April, Cahyono and Islami competed for Orléans Masters in France, but had to lose 1–2 in the first round after secured the first game 21–10 from Taiwanese pair Lee Jhe-huei and Hsu Ya-ching with 18–21, 14–21, in second and third game respectively.

In September, Islami competed at the women's doubles at the Indonesia Masters Super 100 I with her partner Ririn Amelia but lost at the first round from Chinese Taipei pair Sung Yu-hsuan and Wang Szu-min in straight games. She also competed in the mixed doubles with Muhammad Reza Pahlevi Isfahani but lost at the second round from fellow Indonesian player Marwan Faza and Jessica Maya Rismawardani in rubber games.

== Achievements ==
=== BWF World Tour (1 title, 1 runner-up) ===
The BWF World Tour, which was announced on 19 March 2017 and implemented in 2018, is a series of elite badminton tournaments, sanctioned by Badminton World Federation (BWF). The BWF World Tour is divided into six levels, namely World Tour Finals, Super 1000, Super 750, Super 500, Super 300 (part of the HSBC World Tour), and the BWF Tour Super 100.

Mixed doubles
| Year | Tournament | Level | Partner | Opponent | Score | Result |
|---|---|---|---|---|---|---|
| 2018 | Vietnam Open | Super 100 | (Indonesia) Alfian Eko Prasetya | (Thailand) Nipitphon Phuangphuapet (Thailand) Savitree Amitrapai | 21–13, 18–21, 19–21 | (silver) Runner-up |
| 2018 | Chinese Taipei Open | Super 300 | (Indonesia) Alfian Eko Prasetya | (Chinese Taipei) Yang Po-hsuan (Chinese Taipei) Wu Ti-jung | 21–15, 21–11 | (gold) Winner |

=== BWF International Challenge/Series (5 titles, 1 runner-up) ===
Mixed doubles
| Year | Tournament | Partner | Opponent | Score | Result |
|---|---|---|---|---|---|
| 2016 | Indonesia International | (Indonesia) Yantoni Edy Saputra | (Indonesia) Agripina Prima Rahmanto Putra (Indonesia) Apriyani Rahayu | 12–21, 12–21 | (silver) Runner-up |
| 2016 | Singapore International | (Indonesia) Yantoni Edy Saputra | (Singapore) Danny Bawa Chrisnanta (Singapore) Citra Putri Sari Dewi | 21–9, 21–18 | (gold) Winner |
| 2016 | Indonesia International | (Indonesia) Yantoni Edy Saputra | (Indonesia) Irfan Fadhilah (Indonesia) Weni Anggraini | 19–21, 21–16, 21–17 | (gold) Winner |
| 2017 | Malaysia International | (Indonesia) Yantoni Edy Saputra | (India) Nandagopal Kidambi (India) Mahima Aggarwal | 21–19, 21–9 | (gold) Winner |
| 2018 | Finnish Open | (Indonesia) Alfian Eko Prasetya | (Indonesia) Akbar Bintang Cahyono (Indonesia) Winny Oktavina Kandow | 21–18, 21–16 | (gold) Winner |
| 2022 (I) | Indonesia International | (Indonesia) Akbar Bintang Cahyono | (Indonesia) Adnan Maulana (Indonesia) Indah Cahya Sari Jamil | 21–17, 14–21, 21–16 | (gold) Winner |

BWF International Challenge tournament
BWF International Series tournament

=== BWF Junior International ===
Girls' doubles
| Year | Tournament | Partner | Opponent | Score | Result |
|---|---|---|---|---|---|
| 2014 | Dutch Junior | (Indonesia) Rahmadhani Hastiyanti Putri | (Croatia) Katarina Galenić (Croatia) Maja Pavlinić | 17–21, 21–18, 21–18 | (gold) Winner |
| 2015 | Italian Junior | (Indonesia) Rahmadhani Hastiyanti Putri | (Indonesia) Mychelle Crhystine Bandaso (Indonesia) Serena Kani | 19–21, 15–21 | (silver) Runner-up |

Mixed doubles
| Year | Tournament | Partner | Opponent | Score | Result |
|---|---|---|---|---|---|
| 2015 | Italian Junior | (Indonesia) Andika Ramadiansyah | (Russia) Rodion Alimov (Russia) Alina Davletova | 22–20, 21–15 | (gold) Winner |

BWF Junior International Grand Prix tournament
BWF Junior International Challenge tournament
BWF Junior International Series tournament
BWF Junior Future Series tournament

== Performance timeline ==
Key

| W | Won | F | Finalist | SF | Semi-finalist |
| QF | Quarter-finalist | #R | Rounds 4, 3, 2, 1 | RR | Round-robin stage |
| Q# | Qualification round | A | Absent | w/d | Withdrew |
| G | Gold | S | Silver | B | Bronze |
| NH | Not held | N/A | Not applicable | DNQ | Did not qualify |

=== Indonesian team ===
- Junior level

| Team events | 2014 | 2015 |
|---|---|---|
| Asian Junior Championships | A | B |
| World Junior Championships | S | S |

- Senior level

| Team event | 2019 |
|---|---|
| Asia Mixed Team Championships | B |

=== Individual competitions ===
==== Junior level ====
Girls' doubles

| Event | 2014 | 2015 |
|---|---|---|
| World Junior Championships | 2R | QF |

Mixed doubles

| Event | 2014 | 2015 |
|---|---|---|
| World Junior Championships | 2R | 4R |

==== Senior level ====
===== Women's doubles =====
| Tournament | BWF Superseries / Grand Prix | | | | BWF World Tour | | | | | | Best | Ref |
| Tournament | 2014 | 2015 | 2016 | 2017 | 2018 | 2019 | 2020 | 2021 | 2022 | 2023 | Best | Ref |
|---|---|---|---|---|---|---|---|---|---|---|---|---|
| Indonesia Masters | 2R | A | | NH | A | | | | | | 2R ('14) | |
| Indonesia Masters Super 100 | NA | | | | A | | NH | | A | 1R | 1R ('23) | |
| Vietnam Open | A | | | 1R | A | | NH | | A | | 1R ('17) | |
| Year-end ranking | 296 | 408 | —N/a | 184 | —N/a | —N/a | —N/a | —N/a | —N/a | | 167 | |
| Tournament | 2014 | 2015 | 2016 | 2017 | 2018 | 2019 | 2020 | 2021 | 2022 | 2023 | Best | |

===== Mixed doubles =====
| Event | 2018 | 2019 |
|---|---|---|
| Asian Championships | A | 1R |
| World Championships | 1R | DNQ |

| Tournament | BWF Superseries / Grand Prix | | | | BWF World Tour | | | | | | Best | Ref |
| Tournament | 2014 | 2015 | 2016 | 2017 | 2018 | 2019 | 2020 | 2021 | 2022 | 2023 | Best | Ref |
|---|---|---|---|---|---|---|---|---|---|---|---|---|
| Malaysia Open | A | | | | | 1R | NH | | A | | 1R ('19) | |
| Indonesia Masters | 1R | A | 1R | NH | QF | 1R | A | | | Q2 | QF ('18) | |
| Thailand Masters | NH | | A | 2R | 2R | QF | A | NH | | QF | QF ('19, '23) | |
| German Open | A | | | | | 2R | NH | | A | | 2R ('19) | |
| All England Open | A | | | | | 1R | A | | | | 1R ('19) | |
| Swiss Open | A | | | | | | NH | A | 1R | 1R | 1R ('22, '23) | |
| Spain Masters | NH | | | | A | 1R | A | | NH | 1R | 1R ('19, '23) | |
| Orléans Masters | NA | | | | SF | A | NH | A | QF | 1R | SF ('18) | |
| Malaysia Masters | A | | | | 1R | 1R | A | NH | A | | 1R ('18, '19) | |
| Thailand Open | NH | A | | | 1R | 2R | A | NH | QF | A | QF ('22) | |
| Singapore Open | A | | | | 1R | 1R | NH | | A | | 1R ('18, '19) | |
| Indonesia Open | A | | | | 1R | 1R | NH | A | | | 1R ('18, '19) | |
| Chinese Taipei Open | A | | | | W | 1R | NH | | A | | W ('18) | |
| Australian Open | A | | | | QF | A | NH | | 1R | A | QF ('18) | |
| Indonesia Masters Super 100 | NA | | | | 1R | 1R | NH | | QF | 2R | QF ('22) | |
| Vietnam Open | A | | | 1R | F | A | NH | | A | | F ('18) | |
| Korea Masters | A | | | | 1R | A | NH | | A | | 1R ('18) | |
| China Masters | A | | | 2R | A | | NH | | | | 2R ('17) | |
| Syed Modi International | A | | | | SF | A | NH | | A | | SF ('18) | |
| Chinese Taipei Masters | NH | A | 1R | NH | | | | | | | 1R ('16) | |
| Macau Open | A | | | 1R | QF | A | NH | | | NA | QF ('18) | |
| New Zealand Open | A | | | | 2R | A | NH | | | NA | 2R ('18) | |
| Year-end ranking | 551 | 670 | 77 | 60 | 40 | 50 | 81 | 105 | 48 | | 23 | |
| Tournament | 2014 | 2015 | 2016 | 2017 | 2018 | 2019 | 2020 | 2021 | 2022 | 2023 | Best | |
