= 2015 BWF World Junior Championships – Mixed doubles =

2015 BWF World Junior Championships – Mixed Doubles
Tournament details
- Dates: 10 November 2015 – 15 November 2015
- Edition: 17th
- Level: International
- Venue: National Sports Village
- Location: Lima

The Mixed Doubles tournament of the 2015 BWF World Junior Championships is held on November 10–15. The defending champion of the last edition is Huang Kaixiang / Chen Qingchen from China.

== Seeded ==
1. (China) Zheng Siwei / Chen Qingchen (champion)
2. (Turkey) Melih Turgut / Fatma Nur Yavuz (third round)
3. (England) Ben Lane / Jessica Pugh (quarter-final)
4. (Denmark) Frederik Søgaard / Ditte Soby (second round)
5. (Indonesia) Fachriza Abimanyu / Apriani Rahayu (semi-final)
6. (Malaysia) Goh Sze Fei / Teoh Mei Xing (third round)
7. (Chinese Taipei) Yang Ming-tse / Lee Chia-hsin (third round)
8. (China) He Jiting / Du Yue (final)
9. (Indonesia) Andika Ramadiansyah / Marsheilla Gischa Islami (fourth round)
10. (Singapore) Jason Wong Guang Liang / Elaine Chua Yi Ling (fourth round)
11. (Thailand) Pakin Kuna-Anuvit / Kwanchanok Sudjaipraparat (fourth round)
12. (Slovenia) Miha Ivanič / Nika Arih (third round)
13. (France) Thom Gicquel / Delphine Delrue (fourth round)
14. (Indonesia) Yantoni Edy Saputra / Mychelle Chrystine Bandaso (second round)
15. (Indonesia) Yahya Adi Kumara / Rahmadhani Hastiyanti Putri (second round)
16. (France) Thomas Baures / Vimala Heriau (second round)

== Draw ==
=== Finals ===
Quarterfinals
1	(China) Zheng Siwei (China) Chen Qingchen	21	21
(South Korea) Lim Su-min (South Korea) Seong Ah-yeong	14	5
3	(England) Ben Lane (England) Jessica Pugh	17	21	12
(Japan) Shuto Morioka (Japan) Chiharu Shida	21	17	21
8	(China) He Jiting (China) Du Yue	21	21
(China) Fan Qiuyue (China) Chen Lu	10	14
5	(Indonesia) Fachriza Abimanyu (Indonesia) Apriani Rahayu	21	21
(Spain) Alejo Javier Ibeas (Spain) Miren Josebe Azcue	9	7

Semifinals
1	(China) Zheng Siwei (China) Chen Qingchen	21	21
(Japan) Shuto Morioka (Japan) Chiharu Shida	8	12
8	(China) He Jiting (China) Du Yue	21	21
5	(Indonesia) Fachriza Abimanyu (Indonesia) Apriani Rahayu	13	10

Final
1	(China) Zheng Siwei (China) Chen Qingchen	21	21
8	(China) He Jiting (China) Du Yue	19	8

=== Top half ===
==== Section 1 ====
First round
(Hong Kong) Y Chung (Hong Kong) Ng T Y	21	21
(South Africa) M Jennings (South Africa) L Schoeman	7	8
(India) S Sharma (India) N B Hazarika	21	21
(Colombia) K Nupan (Colombia) B Gil	5	6
(Germany) B Geiss (Germany) J Petrikowski	14	21	20
(Canada) J A Ho-Shue (Canada) Q Ouyang	21	16	22
(New Zealand) B Hillier (New Zealand) E Calder-Hawkins	21	12	21
(United States) B Duong (United States) M Sporkert	15	21	16
(Iceland) P Gudfinnsson (Iceland) A K Johannsdottir	8	21	16
(Canada) C Chow (Canada) C Rowe	21	15	21

Second round
1	(China) Zheng SW (China) Chen QC	21	21
(Spain) A Vazquez (Spain) E Murio	6	11
(Hong Kong) Y Chung (Hong Kong) Ng T Y	21	21
(India) S Sharma (India) N B Hazarika	15	11
10	(Singapore) J Wong (Singapore) E Chua	23	21
(Canada) J A Ho-Shue (Canada) Q Ouyang	21	11
(New Zealand) B Hillier (New Zealand) E Calder-Hawkins	7	12
(Canada) C Chow (Canada) C Rowe	21	21

Third round
1	(China) Zheng SW (China) Chen QC	21	21
(Hong Kong) Y Chung (Hong Kong) Ng T Y	10	12
10	(Singapore) J Wong (Singapore) E Chua	21	21
(Canada) C Chow (Canada) C Rowe	14	9

Fourth round
1	(China) Zheng SW (China) Chen QC	21	21
10	(Singapore) J Wong (Singapore) E Chua	7	7

==== Section 2 ====
First round
(Chinese Taipei) Chien H-j (Chinese Taipei) Lai I-t	21	21
(Costa Rica) Z A Zheng (Costa Rica) A L Martinez	2	1
(India) S Rankireddy (India) A Harjani	21	21
(France) G Dunikowski (France) M Lambert	7	15
(Hong Kong) Lam W L (Hong Kong) Fan K Y	8	9
(South Korea) Lim S-m (South Korea) Seong A-y	21	21
(United States) A La (United States) A Lam	21	8	12
(Australia) D Lee (Australia) T Ho	19	21	21
(Guyana) N Ramdhani (Guyana) P Ramdhani	21	21
(Peru) J Guevara (Peru) I Castillo	19	17
(Mexico) F R Trevino (Mexico) A P de la Torre	21	21
(Croatia) F Galjer (Croatia) K Galenic	17	14

Second round
7	(Chinese Taipei) Yang M-t (Chinese Taipei) Lee C-h	21	21
(Chinese Taipei) Chien H-j (Chinese Taipei) Lai I-t	9	16
(India) S Rankireddy (India) A Harjani	17	10
(South Korea) Lim S-m (South Korea) Seong A-y	21	21
11	(Thailand) P Kuna-Anuvit (Thailand) K Sudjaipraparat	21	21
(Australia) D Lee (Australia) T Ho	15	14
(Guyana) N Ramdhani (Guyana) P Ramdhani	14	13
(Mexico) F R Trevino (Mexico) A P de la Torre	21	21

Third round
7	(Chinese Taipei) Yang M-t (Chinese Taipei) Lee C-h	23	15	15
(South Korea) Lim S-m (South Korea) Seong A-y	21	21	21
11	(Thailand) P Kuna-Anuvit (Thailand) K Sudjaipraparat	21	21
(Mexico) F R Trevino (Mexico) A P de la Torre	8	9

Fourth round
(South Korea) Lim S-m (South Korea) Seong A-y	21	21
11	(Thailand) P Kuna-Anuvit (Thailand) K Sudjaipraparat	19	14

==== Section 3 ====
First round
(Argentina) M Delmastro (Argentina) F Bernatene	8	9
(Guatemala) M Umana (Guatemala) A Samayoa	21	21
(Chile) A Medel (Chile) A Montero	8	5
(Netherlands) S Li (Netherlands) D Jille	21	21
(Cuba) A Herrera (Cuba) M Azcuy	21	21
(Italy) L Osele (Italy) S Garino	11	13
(Slovenia) M Cerkovnik (Slovenia) P Polanc	3	13
(Chinese Taipei) Lee C-h (Chinese Taipei) Hsu W-c	21	21
(Italy) F Caponio (Italy) G Fiorito	21	21
(Venezuela) Q Willfer (Venezuela) T Sanchez	17	14

Second round
3	(England) B Lane (England) J Pugh	21	21
(Dominican Republic) A A Marinez (Dominican Republic) B A Polanco	3	7
(Guatemala) M Umana (Guatemala) A Samayoa	20	21	11
(Netherlands) S Li (Netherlands) D Jille	22	19	21
9	(Indonesia) A Ramadiansyah (Indonesia) M G Islami	21	21
(Cuba) A Herrera (Cuba) M Azcuy	5	7
(Chinese Taipei) Lee C-h (Chinese Taipei) Hsu W-c	21	21
(Italy) F Caponio (Italy) G Fiorito	15	9

Third round
3	(England) B Lane (England) J Pugh	21	21
(Netherlands) S Li (Netherlands) D Jille	13	16
9	(Indonesia) A Ramadiansyah (Indonesia) M G Islami	21	21
(Chinese Taipei) Lee C-h (Chinese Taipei) Hsu W-c	17	14

Fourth round
3	(England) B Lane (England) J Pugh	21	21
9	(Indonesia) A Ramadiansyah (Indonesia) M G Islami	8	15

==== Section 4 ====
First round
(Peru) D Mini (Peru) P La Torre	21	16
(Netherlands) N Veenstra (Netherlands) M Baan	23	21
(Chile) D Castillo (Chile) P Pontigo	3	5
(Turkey) O Aydin (Turkey) A Demirbag	21	21
(Denmark) R Kjaer (Denmark) A Magelund	17	14
(Thailand) A Namkul (Thailand) P Chochuwong	21	21
(Slovenia) A Krapez (Slovenia) E Cizelj	21	21
(Barbados) S M Martin (Barbados) A Haywood	9	10
(South Africa) B Nel (South Africa) L Maharaj	15	18
(El Salvador) U F Canjura (El Salvador) F B Centeno	21	21
(England) M Flynn (England) Liew F T	17	12
(Japan) S Morioka (Japan) C Shida	21	21

Second round
6	(Malaysia) Goh S F (Malaysia) Teoh M X	21	21
(Netherlands) N Veenstra (Netherlands) M Baan	13	12
(Turkey) O Aydin (Turkey) A Demirbag	14	14
(Thailand) A Namkul (Thailand) P Chochuwong	21	21
16	(France) T Baures (France) V Heriau	14	23
(Slovenia) A Krapez (Slovenia) E Cizelj	21	25
(El Salvador) U F Canjura (El Salvador) F B Centeno	9	8
(Japan) S Morioka (Japan) C Shida	21	21

Third round
6	(Malaysia) Goh S F (Malaysia) Teoh M X	21	16	19
(Thailand) A Namkul (Thailand) P Chochuwong	13	21	21
(Slovenia) A Krapez (Slovenia) E Cizelj	12	9
(Japan) S Morioka (Japan) C Shida	21	21

Fourth round
(Thailand) A Namkul (Thailand) P Chochuwong	13	11
(Japan) S Morioka (Japan) C Shida	21	21

=== Bottom half ===
==== Section 5 ====
First round
(Netherlands) J Kweekel (Netherlands) I van der Aar	21	21
(El Salvador) J Guardado (El Salvador) M Hernandez	6	9
(Japan) M Onodera (Japan) N Matsuyama	21	15	21
(Hong Kong) Chan Y C (Hong Kong) Yeung S Y	11	21	2
(Guatemala) C A Martinez (Guatemala) M I Paiz	22	17
(South Africa) R Snyman (South Africa) J Scholtz	24	21
(Malaysia) Soh W Y (Malaysia) A Cheong	21	21
(Thailand) P Nipornram (Thailand) R Laisuan	16	15
(South Korea) Lee H-s (South Korea) Seong N-y	22	18
(Hong Kong) Li K H (Hong Kong) Yeung N T	24	21
(Jamaica) S Wilson (Jamaica) E C Reynolds	17	11
(New Zealand) N Tagle (New Zealand) S Fu	21	21

Second round
(Netherlands) J Kweekel (Netherlands) I van der Aar	11	18
(Japan) M Onodera (Japan) N Matsuyama	21	21
(South Africa) R Snyman (South Africa) J Scholtz	8	14
12	(Slovenia) M Ivanic (Slovenia) N Arih	21	21
(Malaysia) Soh W Y (Malaysia) A Cheong	14	21
(Hong Kong) Li K H (Hong Kong) Yeung N T	21	23
(New Zealand) N Tagle (New Zealand) S Fu	6	6
8	(China) He JT (China) Du Y	21	21

Third round
(Japan) M Onodera (Japan) N Matsuyama	21	21
12	(Slovenia) M Ivanic (Slovenia) N Arih	13	17
(Hong Kong) Li K H (Hong Kong) Yeung N T	14	8
8	(China) He JT (China) Du Y	21	21

Fourth round
(Japan) M Onodera (Japan) N Matsuyama	10	11
8	(China) He JT (China) Du Y	21	21

==== Section 6 ====
First round
(New Zealand) C Steeghs (New Zealand) D Yin	13	22	18
(Macau) Iek U I (Macau) Gong X X	21	20	21
(England) M Clare (England) L Tolman	21	21
(Mexico) A J Correa (Mexico) A I Valero	13	16
(China) Fan QY (China) Chen L	21	21
(India) A M Ramachandran (India) K Garg	16	16
(Chinese Taipei) Po L-w (Chinese Taipei) Chen W-t	22	21
(Australia) Tang HD (Australia) A Wu	20	13
(Germany) J C Volker (Germany) R Plutzer	21	21
(Dominican Republic) C A Brito (Dominican Republic) N A Jimenez	15	15

Second round
(Macau) Iek U I (Macau) Gong X X	12	12
(England) M Clare (England) L Tolman	21	21
(China) Fan QY (China) Chen L	21	21
14	(Indonesia) Y E Saputra (Indonesia) M C Bandaso	10	13
(Chinese Taipei) Po L-w (Chinese Taipei) Chen W-t	21	21
(Germany) J C Volker (Germany) R Plutzer	11	13
(Japan) K Ogawa (Japan) Y Takahata	21	22
4	(Denmark) F Sogaard (Denmark) D Soby	17	20

Third round
(England) M Clare (England) L Tolman	15	9
(China) Fan QY (China) Chen L	21	21
(Chinese Taipei) Po L-w (Chinese Taipei) Chen W-t	21	21
(Japan) K Ogawa (Japan) Y Takahata	14	12

Fourth round
(China) Fan QY (China) Chen L	15	23	21
(Chinese Taipei) Po L-w (Chinese Taipei) Chen W-t	21	21	15

==== Section 7 ====
First round
(Costa Rica) G Cavallotti (Costa Rica) L Villalobos	16	8
(Germany) J Voigt (Germany) M Wilson	21	21
(China) Dong WJ (China) Zhou CM	21	21
(Singapore) Chuang J L (Singapore) Ong R N	15	12
(Japan) K Sakai (Japan) N Sone	15	21	19
(Thailand) K Tantianankul (Thailand) S Katethong	21	18	21
(United States) B Chen (United States) J Hsu	21	21
(Colombia) J Noguera (Colombia) T Caicedo	6	7
(Australia) J Lee (Australia) J Lai	17	18
(Canada) J Lai (Canada) K Cheng	21	21
(Italy) K Strobl (Italy) M Punter	19	18
(Switzerland) B Schaller (Switzerland) R Stern	21	21

Second round
(Germany) J Voigt (Germany) M Wilson	8	13
(China) Dong WJ (China) Zhou CM	21	21
(Thailand) K Tantianankul (Thailand) S Katethong	21	15	22
15	(Indonesia) Y A Kumara (Indonesia) R H Putri	16	21	20
(United States) B Chen (United States) J Hsu	24	16	14
(Canada) J Lai (Canada) K Cheng	22	21	21
(Switzerland) B Schaller (Switzerland) R Stern	10	7
5	(Indonesia) F Abimanyu (Indonesia) A Rahayu	21	21

Third round
(China) Dong WJ (China) Zhou CM	21	21
(Thailand) K Tantianankul (Thailand) S Katethong	15	13
(Canada) J Lai (Canada) K Cheng	18	8
5	(Indonesia) F Abimanyu (Indonesia) A Rahayu	21	21

Fourth round
(China) Dong WJ (China) Zhou CM	16	23
5	(Indonesia) F Abimanyu (Indonesia) A Rahayu	21	25

==== Section 8 ====
First round
(Venezuela) I Elyouri (Venezuela) D M Ortiz	21	21
(Chile) M Gompertz (Chile) L Pontigo	6	6
(Sweden) M Lidman (Sweden) M Sjoo	21	21
(Cuba) B Veliz (Cuba) A Artiz	12	15
(Peru) D La Torre (Peru) D Macias	16	17
(Singapore) Lee J L (Singapore) C Wong	21	21
(Iceland) K D Finnsson (Iceland) A K Jonsdottir	14	17
(Sweden) C Harrbacka (Estonia) H Ruutel	21	21
(Mexico) D Morales (Mexico) M Soto	10	12
(Spain) A J Ibeas (Spain) M J Azcue	21	21

Second round
(Venezuela) I Elyouri (Venezuela) D M Ortiz	7	8
(Sweden) M Lidman (Sweden) M Sjoo	21	21
(Singapore) Lee J L (Singapore) C Wong	17	16
13	(France) T Gicquel (France) D Delrue	21	21
(Sweden) C Harrbacka (Estonia) H Ruutel	8	11
(Spain) A J Ibeas (Spain) M J Azcue	21	21
(Guatemala) R Castellanos (Guatemala) A J Paiz	13	16
2	(Turkey) M Turgut (Turkey) F N Yavuz	21	21

Third round
(Sweden) M Lidman (Sweden) M Sjoo	21	20	9
13	(France) T Gicquel (France) D Delrue	18	22	21
(Spain) A J Ibeas (Spain) M J Azcue	15	21	21
2	(Turkey) M Turgut (Turkey) F N Yavuz	21	17	18

Fourth round
13	(France) T Gicquel (France) D Delrue	17	21	16
(Spain) A J Ibeas (Spain) M J Azcue	21	18	21
