= Citra Putri Sari Dewi =

Singaporean badminton player (born 1996)

Personal information
- Born: 2 August 1996 (age 30) Jakarta, Indonesia
- Height: 1.56 m (5 ft 1 in)

Sport
- Country: Singapore
- Sport: Badminton
- Handedness: Right

Women's & mixed doubles
- Highest ranking: 39 (WD with Jin Yujia 15 June 2017); 87 (XD with Jason Wong 12 July 2018)
- BWF profile

Citra Putri Sari Dewi (born 2 August 1996) is an Indonesian-born Singaporean badminton player. Born in Jakarta, she started playing badminton at age 6, and in 2008, as part of the Riau Islands province she competed at the Indonesia National Games. She moved to Singapore to continue her studies, and graduated from the Paya Lebar Methodist Girls' School. She was the ASEAN School Games gold medalists in the mixed doubles in 2012 and in the girls' doubles in 2013.

== Early life and family ==
Citra Putri Sari Dewi was born in a badminton family. Her father Sugeng Subagyo was a former Indonesia national badminton player, and the owner of Nusantara badminton club in Sleman. She was the eighth of nine siblings. The first and second of the siblings are Hengky Kurniawan Saputra and Anita Kartika Sari who played in the Indonesia national event tournament. After that the twin Wandry and Hendri Kurniawan Saputra, the twin was a former Singapore national player, and now works as a coach in Malaysia and Singapore respectively. The fifth and the sixth are Hendra Wijaya and Shinta Mulia Sari who were also a former Singapore national player, then Dian Permata Sari who played in the Indonesia national event, and now works as a badminton coach in Sydney, Australia. Her younger brother Frengky Wijaya Putra is an Indonesian national doubles player.

== Achievements ==
=== BWF International Challenge/Series (3 titles, 3 runners-up) ===
Women's doubles
Year	Tournament	Partner	Opponent	Score	Result
2017	Iran Fajr International	(Singapore) Jin Yujia	(Singapore) Ren-ne Ong (Singapore) Crystal Wong	8–11, 13–11, 11–7, 8–11, 5–11	(silver) Runner-up
2017	India International Series	(Singapore) Jin Yujia	(Malaysia) Lim Jee Lynn (Malaysia) Yap Zhen	20–22, 21–9, 21–13	(gold) Winner
2018	Mongolia International	(Singapore) Jin Yujia	(Macau) Gong Xue Xin (Macau) Ng Weng Chi	21–16, 21–9	(gold) Winner

Mixed doubles
Year	Tournament	Partner	Opponent	Score	Result
2016	Singapore International	(Singapore) Danny Bawa Chrisnanta	(Indonesia) Yantoni Edy Saputra (Indonesia) Marsheilla Gischa Islami	9–21, 18–21	(silver) Runner-up
2018	White Nights	(Singapore) Jason Wong	(Russia) Rodion Alimov (Russia) Alina Davletova	14–21, 19–21	(silver) Runner-up
2018	South Australia International	(Singapore) Terry Hee	(Japan) Kohei Gondo (Japan) Ayane Kurihara	22–20, 21–18	(gold) Winner

BWF International Challenge tournament
BWF International Series tournament
BWF Future Series tournament
