= 2025 Arctic Open =

Badminton tournament in Finland

Tournament details
- Dates: 7–12 October
- Edition: 25th
- Level: Super 500
- Total prize money: US$475,000
- Venue: Energia Areena
- Location: Vantaa, Finland

Champions
- Men's singles: (Chinese Taipei) Chou Tien-chen
- Women's singles: (Japan) Akane Yamaguchi
- Men's doubles: (England) Ben Lane (England) Sean Vendy
- Women's doubles: (Malaysia) Pearly Tan (Malaysia) Thinaah Muralitharan
- Mixed doubles: (China) Jiang Zhenbang (China) Wei Yaxin
- Official website: www.arcticopen.fi

The 2025 Arctic Open (officially known as the Clash of Clans Arctic Open 2025 powered by Yonex for sponsorship reasons) was a badminton tournament which took place at Energia Areena in Vantaa, Finland, from 7 to 12 October 2025 and had a total purse of $475,000.

== Tournament ==
The 2025 Arctic Open was the twenty-eighth tournament of the 2025 BWF World Tour and also part of the Arctic Open championships (previously known as Finnish Open), which had been held since 1990. This tournament was organized by Badminton Finland and sanctioned by the BWF.

=== Venue ===
This tournament was held at Energia Areena in Vantaa, Finland.

=== Point distribution ===
Below is the point distribution table for each phase of the tournament based on the BWF points system for the BWF World Tour Super 500 event.

Winner	Runner-up	3/4	5/8	9/16	17/32	33/64	65/128
9,200	7,800	6,420	5,040	3,600	2,220	880	430

=== Prize pool ===
The total prize money was US$475,000 with the distribution of the prize money in accordance with BWF regulations.

Event	Winner	Finalist	Semi-finals	Quarter-finals	Last 16
Singles	$35,625	$18,050	$6,887.50	$2,850	$1,662.50
Doubles	$37,525	$18,050	$6,650	$3,443.75	$1,781.25

== Men's singles ==
=== Seeds ===
1. (Thailand) Kunlavut Vitidsarn (final)
2. (Chinese Taipei) Chou Tien-chen (champion)
3. (France) Christo Popov (second round)
4. (China) Weng Hongyang (first round)
5. (Japan) Kodai Naraoka (quarter-finals)
6. (Japan) Kenta Nishimoto (second round)
7. (France) Toma Junior Popov (first round)
8. (China) Lu Guangzu (quarter-finals)

=== Finals ===
Semi-finals
1	(Thailand) Kunlavut Vitidsarn	21	21
(Denmark) Rasmus Gemke	15	18
(France) Arnaud Merklé	21	13	13
2	(Chinese Taipei) Chou Tien-chen	13	21	21

Final
1	(Thailand) Kunlavut Vitidsarn	11	21	19
2	(Chinese Taipei) Chou Tien-chen	21	13	21

=== Top half ===
==== Section 1 ====
First round
1	(Thailand) K Vitidsarn	21	21
(India) A Shetty	15	16
(China) Wang ZX	11	17
(Japan) Y Tanaka	21	21
7	(France) T J Popov	21	11	20
(India) T Mannepalli	11	21	22
(India) K George	10	1^{r}
(Japan) K Watanabe	21	4

Second round
1	(Thailand) K Vitidsarn	21	21
(Japan) Y Tanaka	13	14
(India) T Mannepalli	20	12
(Japan) K Watanabe	22	21

Quarter-finals
1	(Thailand) K Vitidsarn	21	21
(Japan) K Watanabe	17	19

==== Section 2 ====
First round
3	(France) C Popov	21	21
(India) S Subramanian	17	11
(Denmark) R Gemke	w	/	o
(India) S Kidambi
5	(Japan) K Naraoka	21	21
(India) L Sen	15	17
(Chinese Taipei) Lee C-h	21	21
Q1	(Belgium) J Carraggi	10	10

Second round
3	(France) C Popov	21	10	19
(Denmark) R Gemke	5	21	21
5	(Japan) K Naraoka	21	21
(Chinese Taipei) Lee C-h	13	16

Quarter-finals
(Denmark) R Gemke	21	21
5	(Japan) K Naraoka	19	16

=== Bottom half ===
==== Section 3 ====
First round
(France) A Merklé	21	21
(Finland) J Oldorff	19	14
(Hong Kong) Ng K L	11	14
6	(Japan) K Nishimoto	21	21
(Chinese Taipei) Chi Y-j	21	11	11
Q3	(Denmark) M Johannesen	16	21	21
(Singapore) J Teh	17	21	21
4	(China) Weng HY	21	19	10

Second round
(France) A Merklé	21	21
6	(Japan) K Nishimoto	12	10
Q3	(Denmark) M Johannesen	16	7
(Singapore) J Teh	21	21

Quarter-finals
(France) A Merklé	24	21
(Singapore) J Teh	22	18

==== Section 4 ====
First round
(Finland) K Koljonen	21	19
(Japan) T Obayashi	23	21
Q4	(Japan) K Takahashi	14	15
8	(China) Lu GZ	21	21
(Chinese Taipei) Wang T-w	21	21
(Canada) B Yang	19	11
Q2	(Denmark) D J Holm	21	18	12
2	(Chinese Taipei) Chou T-c	18	21	21

Second round
(Japan) T Obayashi	15	12
8	(China) Lu GZ	21	21
(Chinese Taipei) Wang T-w	14	21	16
2	(Chinese Taipei) Chou T-c	21	16	21

Quarter-finals
8	(China) Lu GZ	21	17	18
2	(Chinese Taipei) Chou T-c	15	21	21

== Women's singles ==
=== Seeds ===
1. (Japan) Akane Yamaguchi (champion)
2. (Thailand) Ratchanok Intanon (semi-finals)
3. (China) Gao Fangjie (second round)
4. (Thailand) Busanan Ongbamrungphan (final)
5. (Denmark) Line Kjærsfeldt (quarter-finals)
6. (Chinese Taipei) Lin Hsiang-ti (first round)
7. (Chinese Taipei) Chiu Pin-chian (quarter-finals)
8. (Denmark) Mia Blichfeldt (quarter-finals)

=== Finals ===
Semi-finals
1	(Japan) Akane Yamaguchi	21	21
(India) Anmol Kharb	10	13
4	(Thailand) Busanan Ongbamrungphan	28	21
2	(Thailand) Ratchanok Intanon	26	18

Final
1	(Japan) Akane Yamaguchi	21	21
4	(Thailand) Busanan Ongbamrungphan	19	16

=== Top half ===
==== Section 1 ====
First round
1	(Japan) A Yamaguchi	21	21
(China) Wu LY	13	12
(Japan) R Gunji	21	21
(Denmark) A S Ryberg	10	12
8	(Denmark) M Blichfeldt	21	21
Q2	(India) K Selvam	16	16
(China) Han QX	21	21
Q1	(Ukraine) Y Kantemyr	18	10

Second round
1	(Japan) A Yamaguchi	21	21
(Japan) R Gunji	17	9
8	(Denmark) M Blichfeldt	21	21
(China) Han QX	14	13

Quarter-finals
1	(Japan) A Yamaguchi	21	10
8	(Denmark) M Blichfeldt	11	8^{r}

==== Section 2 ====
First round
3	(China) Gao FJ	21	21
(Germany) Y Li	18	17
(Denmark) A Schulz	17	21	21
(Chinese Taipei) Sung S-y	21	18	12
6	(Chinese Taipei) Lin H-t	21	21	18
(India) A Kharb	23	11	21
(Bulgaria) K Nalbantova	21	13	17
(Chinese Taipei) Hsu W-c	18	21	21

Second round
3	(China) Gao FJ	18	21	16
(Denmark) A Schulz	21	18	21
(India) A Kharb	18	21	21
(Chinese Taipei) Hsu W-c	21	18	17

Quarter-finals
(Denmark) A Schulz	15	14
(India) A Kharb	21	21

=== Bottom half ===
==== Section 3 ====
First round
(Czech Republic) T Švábíková	21	21
(Finland) P Saarnivaara	10	9
(Denmark) J D Jakobsen	19	11
5	(Denmark) L Kjærsfeldt	21	21
(Italy) Y Hamza	12	12
(Denmark) L Christophersen	21	21
(Ukraine) P Buhrova	15	13
4	(Thailand) B Ongbamrungphan	21	21

Second round
(Czech Republic) T Švábíková	6	10
5	(Denmark) L Kjærsfeldt	21	21
(Denmark) L Christophersen	13	21	19
4	(Thailand) B Ongbamrungphan	21	15	21

Quarter-finals
5	(Denmark) L Kjærsfeldt	21	17	11
4	(Thailand) B Ongbamrungphan	18	21	21

==== Section 4 ====
First round
Q3	(Estonia) K Kuuba	14	21	21
Q4	(Finland) N Nyqvist	21	17	17
(Scotland) K Gilmour	7	15
7	(Chinese Taipei) Chiu P-c	21	21
(Chinese Taipei) Huang C-p	20	18
(India) T Hemanth	22	21
(France) R Cloteaux-Foucault	5	12
2	(Thailand) R Intanon	21	21

Second round
Q3	(Estonia) K Kuuba	21	10	11
7	(Chinese Taipei) Chiu P-c	16	21	21
(India) T Hemanth	9	8
2	(Thailand) R Intanon	21	21

Quarter-finals
7	(Chinese Taipei) Chiu P-c	13	8
2	(Thailand) R Intanon	21	21

== Men's doubles ==
=== Seeds ===
1. (Malaysia) Aaron Chia / Soh Wooi Yik (final)
2. (Malaysia) Goh Sze Fei / Nur Izzuddin (withdrew)
3. (Denmark) Kim Astrup / Anders Skaarup Rasmussen (quarter-finals)
4. (China) Liang Weikeng / Wang Chang (quarter-finals)
5. (Malaysia) Man Wei Chong / Tee Kai Wun (withdrew)
6. (China) Chen Boyang / Liu Yi (quarter-finals)
7. (Chinese Taipei) Lee Jhe-huei / Yang Po-hsuan (second round)
8. (Thailand) Kittinupong Kedren / Dechapol Puavaranukroh (semi-finals)

=== Finals ===
Semi-finals
1	(Malaysia) Aaron Chia (Malaysia) Soh Wooi Yik	21	21
8	(Thailand) Kittinupong Kedren (Thailand) Dechapol Puavaranukroh	15	14
SWM	(England) Ben Lane (England) Sean Vendy	21	25
(Malaysia) Choong Hon Jian (Malaysia) Muhammad Haikal	16	23

Final
1	(Malaysia) Aaron Chia (Malaysia) Soh Wooi Yik	18	27	17
SWM	(England) Ben Lane (England) Sean Vendy	21	25	21

=== Top half ===
==== Section 1 ====
First round
1	(Malaysia) A Chia (Malaysia) Soh W Y	21	21
(Denmark) D Lundgaard (Denmark) M Vestergaard	18	15
Q1
(Malaysia) Low H Y (Malaysia) Ng E C	w	/	o
7	(Chinese Taipei) Lee J-h (Chinese Taipei) Yang P-hs	21	21
Q3	(Estonia) R Käsner (Estonia) K Kaljurand	11	14
(Czech Republic) J Král (Czech Republic) O Král	9	19
(Chinese Taipei) Liu K-h (Chinese Taipei) Yang P-ha	21	21

Second round
1	(Malaysia) A Chia (Malaysia) Soh W Y	15	21	21
(Malaysia) Low H Y (Malaysia) Ng E C	21	14	14
7	(Chinese Taipei) Lee J-h (Chinese Taipei) Yang P-hs	18	9
(Chinese Taipei) Liu K-h (Chinese Taipei) Yang P-ha	21	21

Quarter-finals
1	(Malaysia) A Chia (Malaysia) Soh W Y	21	19	21
(Chinese Taipei) Liu K-h (Chinese Taipei) Yang P-ha	19	21	17

==== Section 2 ====
First round
4	(China) Liang WK (China) Wang C	17	21	21
(Japan) K Mitsuhashi (Japan) H Okamura	21	13	15
(France) J Maio (France) W Villeger	21	19	17
(France) M Cattoen (France) L Renoir	15	21	21
8	(Thailand) K Kedren (Thailand) D Puavaranukroh	21	14	21
(Republic of Ireland) S Guildea (Republic of Ireland) P Reynolds	8	21	11
Q2	(Finland) E Melleri (Finland) N Nyqvist	11	9
(China) Xie HN (China) Zeng WH	21	21

Second round
4	(China) Liang WK (China) Wang C	21	21
(France) M Cattoen (France) L Renoir	12	16
8	(Thailand) K Kedren (Thailand) D Puavaranukroh	21	21
(China) Xie HN (China) Zeng WH	17	19

Quarter-finals
4	(China) Liang WK (China) Wang C	21	14	19
8	(Thailand) K Kedren (Thailand) D Puavaranukroh	19	21	21

=== Bottom half ===
==== Section 3 ====
First round
PFQ	(Poland) A Krawczyk (Poland) S Slepecki	20	15
(Denmark) W K Boe (Denmark) C F Kjær	22	21
(Chinese Taipei) Chiang C-w (Chinese Taipei) Wu H-y	12	15
SWM	(England) B Lane (England) S Vendy	21	21
(Chinese Taipei) Chiu H-c (Chinese Taipei) Wang C-l	21	21
(France) C Popov (France) T J Popov	16	12
PFQ	(Denmark) R Espersen (Denmark) A Søndergaard	16	13
6	(China) Chen BY (China) Liu Yi	21	21

Second round
(Denmark) W K Boe (Denmark) C F Kjær	21	21	19
SWM	(England) B Lane (England) S Vendy	16	23	21
(Chinese Taipei) Chiu H-c (Chinese Taipei) Wang C-l	12	15
6	(China) Chen BY (China) Liu Yi	21	21

Quarter-finals
SWM	(England) B Lane (England) S Vendy	21	21
6	(China) Chen BY (China) Liu Yi	16	12

==== Section 4 ====
First round
(France) É Adam (France) L Rossi	19	21	21
(Scotland) C Grimley (Scotland) M Grimley	21	16	17
(Malaysia) Choong H J (Malaysia) M Haikal	23	22
SWM	(China) Huang D (China) Liu Ya	21	20
(Malaysia) J Arif (Malaysia) Yap R K	21	21
Q4	(Sweden) M Molin (Sweden) M Svensson	13	15
(Scotland) A Dunn (Scotland) A Pringle	12	16
3	(Denmark) K Astrup (Denmark) A S Rasmussen	21	21

Second round
(France) É Adam (France) L Rossi	21	10	16
(Malaysia) Choong H J (Malaysia) M Haikal	12	21	21
(Malaysia) J Arif (Malaysia) Yap R K	13	21	13
3	(Denmark) K Astrup (Denmark) A S Rasmussen	21	12	21

Quarter-finals
(Malaysia) Choong H J (Malaysia) M Haikal	23	21
3	(Denmark) K Astrup (Denmark) A S Rasmussen	21	15

== Women's doubles ==
=== Seeds ===
1. (China) Liu Shengshu / Tan Ning (second round)
2. (Malaysia) Pearly Tan / Thinaah Muralitharan (champions)
3. (Japan) Rin Iwanaga / Kie Nakanishi (final)
4. (Chinese Taipei) Hsieh Pei-shan / Hung En-tzu (semi-finals)
5. (Hong Kong) Yeung Nga Ting / Yeung Pui Lam (quarter-finals)
6. (China) Bao Lijing / Zhang Shuxian (quarter-finals)
7. (Chinese Taipei) Chang Ching-hui / Yang Ching-tun (first round)
8. (Chinese Taipei) Hsu Yin-hui / Lin Jhih-yun (second round)

=== Finals ===
Semi-finals
(Japan) Arisa Igarashi (Japan) Chiharu Shida	14	21	24
3	(Japan) Rin Iwanaga (Japan) Kie Nakanishi	21	12	26
4	(Chinese Taipei) Hsieh Pei-shan (Chinese Taipei) Hung En-tzu	24	8	17
2	(Malaysia) Pearly Tan (Malaysia) Thinaah Muralitharan	22	21	21

Final
3	(Japan) Rin Iwanaga (Japan) Kie Nakanishi	7	9
2	(Malaysia) Pearly Tan (Malaysia) Thinaah Muralitharan	21	21

=== Top half ===
==== Section 1 ====
First round
1	(China) Liu SS (China) Tan N	21	21
(Chinese Taipei) Sung S-y (Chinese Taipei) Yu C-h	11	16
(Sweden) M Norrman (Sweden) T Sjöö	8	19
(Chinese Taipei) Hsu Y-c (Chinese Taipei) Sung Y-h	21	21
7	(Chinese Taipei) Chang C-h (Chinese Taipei) Yang C-t	10	15
(Japan) K Osawa (Japan) M Tanabe	21	21
(Japan) A Igarashi (Japan) C Shida	21	15	21
(Indonesia) L T Mayasari (Indonesia) A C Pratiwi	13	21	12

Second round
1	(China) Liu SS (China) Tan N
(Chinese Taipei) Hsu Y-c (Chinese Taipei) Sung Y-h	w	/	o
(Japan) K Osawa (Japan) M Tanabe	14	17
(Japan) A Igarashi (Japan) C Shida	21	21

Quarter-finals
(Chinese Taipei) Hsu Y-c (Chinese Taipei) Sung Y-h	18	19
(Japan) A Igarashi (Japan) C Shida	21	21

==== Section 2 ====
First round
3	(Japan) R Iwanaga (Japan) K Nakanishi	22	21
(Chinese Taipei) Hu L-f (Chinese Taipei) Jheng Y-c	20	13
(China) Keng SL (China) Li HZ	20	17
(Indonesia) R A Rose (Indonesia) F Setianingrum	22	21
5	(Hong Kong) Yeung N T (Hong Kong) Yeung P L	21	21
(India) K Selvam (India) S Singh	9	13
Q2	(Denmark) S Pilgaard (Denmark) S Schulz	21	21
Q4	(Switzerland) A Müller (Netherlands) K van Buiten	18	11

Second round
3	(Japan) R Iwanaga (Japan) K Nakanishi	21	30
(Indonesia) R A Rose (Indonesia) F Setianingrum	14	29
5	(Hong Kong) Yeung N T (Hong Kong) Yeung P L	21	21
Q2	(Denmark) S Pilgaard (Denmark) S Schulz	14	10

Quarter-finals
3	(Japan) R Iwanaga (Japan) K Nakanishi	19	21	21
5	(Hong Kong) Yeung N T (Hong Kong) Yeung P L	21	18	9

=== Bottom half ===
==== Section 3 ====
First round
(China) Li WM (China) Wang TG	21	21
(Finland) S Asfar (Finland) O Tapola	7	8
(Hong Kong) Lui L L (Hong Kong) Tsang H Y	11	10
6	(China) Bao LJ (China) Zhang SX	21	21
(Poland) P Cybulska (Poland) K Marczak	27	20	21
(Ukraine) P Buhrova (Ukraine) Y Kantemyr	25	22	19
PFQ	(Netherlands) K de Wit (Netherlands) M Loos	9	2
4	(Chinese Taipei) Hsieh P-s (Chinese Taipei) Hung E-t	21	21

Second round
(China) Li WM (China) Wang TG	14	14
6	(China) Bao LJ (China) Zhang SX	21	21
(Poland) P Cybulska (Poland) K Marczak	11	8
4	(Chinese Taipei) Hsieh P-s (Chinese Taipei) Hung E-t	21	21

Quarter-finals
6	(China) Bao LJ (China) Zhang SX	14	16
4	(Chinese Taipei) Hsieh P-s (Chinese Taipei) Hung E-t	21	21

==== Section 4 ====
First round
Q3	(Finland) S A Brahmakal (Finland) A Övermark	12	8
(France) M Lambert (France) C Pognante	21	21
(Thailand) B Aimsaard (Thailand) S S Wedler	12	13
8	(Chinese Taipei) Hsu Y-h (Chinese Taipei) Lin J-y	21	21
Q1
(Indonesia) F D Kusuma (Indonesia) M T Puspita Sari	w	/	o
PFQ	(Denmark) N P Anthonisen (Denmark) A C Kudsk	13	14
2	(Malaysia) P Tan (Malaysia) Thinaah M	21	21

Second round
(France) M Lambert (France) C Pognante	19	21	21
8	(Chinese Taipei) Hsu Y-h (Chinese Taipei) Lin J-y	21	15	19
(Indonesia) F D Kusuma (Indonesia) M T Puspita Sari	15	13
2	(Malaysia) P Tan (Malaysia) Thinaah M	21	21

Quarter-finals
(France) M Lambert (France) C Pognante	11	19
2	(Malaysia) P Tan (Malaysia) Thinaah M	21	21

== Mixed doubles ==
=== Seeds ===
1. (China) Jiang Zhenbang / Wei Yaxin (champions)
2. (China) Feng Yanzhe / Huang Dongping (final)
3. (Thailand) Dechapol Puavaranukroh / Supissara Paewsampran (semi-finals)
4. (China) Guo Xinwa / Chen Fanghui (first round)
5. (Malaysia) Goh Soon Huat / Shevon Jemie Lai (quarter-finals)
6. (Denmark) Jesper Toft / Amalie Magelund (second round)
7. (Chinese Taipei) Yang Po-hsuan / Hu Ling-fang (second round)
8. (India) Dhruv Kapila / Tanisha Crasto (quarter-finals)

=== Finals ===
Semi-finals
1	(China) Jiang Zhenbang (China) Wei Yaxin	16	21	21
(Thailand) Pakkapon Teeraratsakul (Thailand) Sapsiree Taerattanachai	21	12	12
3	(Thailand) Dechapol Puavaranukroh (Thailand) Supissara Paewsampran	21	16	12
2	(China) Feng Yanzhe (China) Huang Dongping	15	21	21

Final
1	(China) Jiang Zhenbang (China) Wei Yaxin	21	24
2	(China) Feng Yanzhe (China) Huang Dongping	19	22

=== Top half ===
==== Section 1 ====
First round
(Chinese Taipei) Chen C-k (Chinese Taipei) Hsu Y-h	6	20
(Chinese Taipei) Ye H-w (Chinese Taipei) N G Chan	21	22
8	(India) D Kapila (India) T Crasto	21	21
(France) L Renoir (France) C Pognante	9	7
(Ukraine) O Titov (Ukraine) Y Kantemyr	21	21
(Scotland) C Grimley (Scotland) C Torrance	16	17

Second round
1	(China) Jiang ZB (China) Wei YX	21	21
(Chinese Taipei) Ye H-w (Chinese Taipei) N G Chan	17	14
8	(India) D Kapila (India) T Crasto	23	21	21
(Ukraine) O Titov (Ukraine) Y Kantemyr	25	14	17

Quarter-finals
1	(China) Jiang ZB (China) Wei YX	21	21
8	(India) D Kapila (India) T Crasto	7	10

==== Section 2 ====
First round
4	(China) Guo XW (China) Chen FH	7	15
(Thailand) P Teeraratsakul (Thailand) S Taerattanachai	21	21
(Thailand) P Horbanluekit (Thailand) B Aimsaard	21	15	18
(Denmark) M Vestergaard (Denmark) C Busch	16	21	21
7	(Chinese Taipei) Yang P-hs (Chinese Taipei) Hu L-f	19	23	21
(Chinese Taipei) Liu K-h (Chinese Taipei) Jheng Y-c	21	21	19
(Estonia) M Õunmaa (Estonia) R Üprus	12	12
(China) Gao JX (China) Wu MY	21	21

Second round
(Thailand) P Teeraratsakul (Thailand) S Taerattanachai	22	21
(Denmark) M Vestergaard (Denmark) C Busch	20	16
7	(Chinese Taipei) Yang P-hs (Chinese Taipei) Hu L-f	21	21	14
(China) Gao JX (China) Wu MY	23	18	21

Quarter-finals
(Thailand) P Teeraratsakul (Thailand) S Taerattanachai	21	21
(China) Gao JX (China) Wu MY	16	17

=== Bottom half ===
==== Section 3 ====
First round
(Poland) S Slepecki (Poland) A Khomich
(Italy) I Santoro (England) K Feng	w	/	o
(Scotland) A Dunn (Scotland) J MacPherson
5	(Malaysia) Goh S H (Malaysia) S J Lai	w	/	o
(France) J Maio (France) L Palermo
(Czech Republic) O Král (Czech Republic) T Švábíková	w	/	o
(Netherlands) A Buijk (Netherlands) M Loos	7	12
3	(Thailand) D Puavaranukroh (Thailand) S Paewsampran	21	21

Second round
(Italy) I Santoro (England) K Feng	2	5
5	(Malaysia) Goh S H (Malaysia) S J Lai	21	21
(Czech Republic) O Král (Czech Republic) T Švábíková	15	16
3	(Thailand) D Puavaranukroh (Thailand) S Paewsampran	21	21

Quarter-finals
5	(Malaysia) Goh S H (Malaysia) S J Lai	12	14
3	(Thailand) D Puavaranukroh (Thailand) S Paewsampran	21	21

==== Section 4 ====
First round
(Chinese Taipei) Lu M-c (Chinese Taipei) Hung E-t	21	21
(Denmark) R Espersen (Denmark) A C Kudsk	15	16
(Sweden) F Karlborg (Sweden) T Sjöö	25	7	15
6	(Denmark) J Toft (Denmark) A Magelund	23	21	21
(Netherlands) B Wassink (Netherlands) D Jille	21	21
(India) M Jaglan (India) L Jaglan	19	15

Second round
(Chinese Taipei) Lu M-c (Chinese Taipei) Hung E-t	22	21
6	(Denmark) J Toft (Denmark) A Magelund	20	10
(Netherlands) B Wassink (Netherlands) D Jille	8	14
2	(China) Feng YZ (China) Huang DP	21	21

Quarter-finals
(Chinese Taipei) Lu M-c (Chinese Taipei) Hung E-t	21	8	11
2	(China) Feng YZ (China) Huang DP	18	21	21

Preceded by 2025 Al Ain Masters	BWF World Tour; 2025 BWF season	Succeeded by 2025 Denmark Open; 2025 Malaysia Super 100
