= 2024 Hong Kong Open (badminton) =

2024 badminton tournament

Tournament details
- Dates: 10–15 September
- Edition: 34th
- Level: Super 500
- Total prize money: US$420,000
- Venue: Hong Kong Coliseum
- Location: Kowloon, Hong Kong

Champions
- Men's singles: (Denmark) Viktor Axelsen
- Women's singles: (China) Han Yue
- Men's doubles: (South Korea) Kang Min-hyuk (South Korea) Seo Seung-jae
- Women's doubles: (Malaysia) Pearly Tan (Malaysia) Thinaah Muralitharan
- Mixed doubles: (China) Jiang Zhenbang (China) Wei Yaxin

The 2024 Hong Kong Open, officially the Li-Ning Hong Kong Open 2024, was a badminton tournament which took place at the Hong Kong Coliseum in Hong Kong from 10 to 15 September 2024 and had a total prize of $420,000.

== Tournament ==
The 2024 Hong Kong Open was the twenty-fifth tournament of the 2024 BWF World Tour and also part of the Hong Kong Open championships, which had been held since 1982. This tournament was organized by Hong Kong Badminton Association and sanctioned by the BWF.

=== Venue ===
This tournament was held at the Hong Kong Coliseum in Hong Kong.

=== Point distribution ===
Below is a table with the point distribution for each phase of the tournament based on the BWF points system for the BWF World Tour Super 500 event.

Winner	Runner-up	3/4	5/8	9/16	17/32	33/64	65/128
9,200	7,800	6,420	5,040	3,600	2,220	880	430

=== Prize money ===
The total prize money for this tournament was US$420,000. Distribution of prize money is in accordance with BWF regulations.

Event	Winner	Finals	Semi-finals	Quarter-finals	Last 16
Singles	$31,500	$15,960	$6,090	$2,520	$1,470
Doubles	$33,180	$15,960	$5,880	$3,045	$1,575

== Men's singles ==
=== Seeds ===
1. (China) Shi Yuqi (withdrew)
2. (Denmark) Viktor Axelsen (champion)
3. (Indonesia) Jonatan Christie (semi-finals)
4. (China) Li Shifeng (withdrew)
5. (Japan) Kodai Naraoka (quarter-finals)
6. (Chinese Taipei) Chou Tien-chen (quarter-finals)
7. (Indonesia) Anthony Sinisuka Ginting (semi-finals)
8. (Singapore) Loh Kean Yew (first round)

=== Finals ===
Semi-finals
3	(Indonesia) Jonatan Christie	14	21	17
(China) Lei Lanxi	21	12	21
7	(Indonesia) Anthony Sinisuka Ginting	9	19
2	(Denmark) Viktor Axelsen	21	21

Final
(China) Lei Lanxi	9	12
2	(Denmark) Viktor Axelsen	21	21

=== Top half ===
==== Section 1 ====
First round
3	(Indonesia) J Christie	21	21
(Chinese Taipei) Wang T-w	7	10
PFQ	(Malaysia) J Hoh	7	23	18
(Denmark) R Gemke	21	21	21
5	(Japan) K Naraoka	21	21
Q2	(Chinese Taipei) Huang Y-k	13	13
(India) P Rajawat	9	21	9
(Japan) T Obayashi	21	16	21

Second round
3	(Indonesia) J Christie	21	21
(Denmark) R Gemke	12	19
5	(Japan) K Naraoka	19	26	21
(Japan) T Obayashi	21	24	11

Quarter-finals
3	(Indonesia) J Christie	21	12	21
5	(Japan) K Naraoka	16	21	15

==== Section 2 ====
First round
8	(Singapore) Loh K Y	17	17
(South Korea) Jeon H-j	21	21
(China) Lei LX	18	21	21
(China) Weng HY	21	10	11
SWM	(China) Lu GZ	18	19
(Hong Kong) Lee C Y	21	21
(Malaysia) Leong J H	4	21	21
Q3	(Hong Kong) Chan Y C	21	11	17

Second round
(South Korea) Jeon H-j	21	16	14
(China) Lei LX	17	21	21
(Hong Kong) Lee C Y	21	15	24
(Malaysia) Leong J H	14	21	22

Quarter-finals
(China) Lei LX	16	21	21
(Hong Kong) Lee C Y	21	15	14

=== Bottom half ===
==== Section 3 ====
First round
PFQ	(Malaysia) Cheam J W	19	10
(France) C Popov	21	21
PFQ	(Hong Kong) J Gunawan	21	21
SWM	(Japan) K Nishimoto	13	18
(Chinese Taipei) Chi Y-j	21	21
(Japan) Y Tanaka	18	11
(France) T J Popov	9	21	10
7	(Indonesia) A S Ginting	21	12	21

Second round
(France) C Popov	16	9
PFQ	(Hong Kong) J Gunawan	21	21
(Chinese Taipei) Chi Y-j	18	22	9
7	(Indonesia) A S Ginting	21	20	21

Quarter-finals
PFQ	(Hong Kong) J Gunawan	17	21	18
7	(Indonesia) A S Ginting	21	14	21

==== Section 4 ====
First round
(Indonesia) C A Dwi Wardoyo	20	17
Q1	(Thailand) S Jamsri	22	21
Q4	(Canada) XD Sheng	18	12
6	(Chinese Taipei) Chou T-c	21	21
(Chinese Taipei) Su L-y	21	21
(India) K George	16	16
(Hong Kong) Ng K L	11	12
2	(Denmark) V Axelsen	21	21

Second round
Q1	(Thailand) S Jamsri	15	19
6	(Chinese Taipei) Chou T-c	21	21
(Chinese Taipei) Su L-y	22	6
2	(Denmark) V Axelsen	24	21

Quarter-finals
6	(Chinese Taipei) Chou T-c	15	14
2	(Denmark) V Axelsen	21	21

== Women's singles ==
=== Seeds ===
1. (Chinese Taipei) Tai Tzu-ying (second round)
2. (China) Wang Zhiyi (withdrew)
3. (China) Han Yue (champion)
4. (Indonesia) Gregoria Mariska Tunjung (second round)
5. (Japan) Aya Ohori (quarter-finals)
6. (Thailand) Busanan Ongbamrungphan (quarter-finals)
7. (South Korea) Kim Ga-eun (second round)
8. (Japan) Nozomi Okuhara (withdrew)

=== Finals ===
Semi-finals
(Indonesia) Putri Kusuma Wardani	22	21	21
(Japan) Tomoka Miyazaki	20	23	18
SWM	(Thailand) Pornpawee Chochuwong	20	10
3	(China) Han Yue	22	21

Final
(Indonesia) Putri Kusuma Wardani	18	7
3	(China) Han Yue	21	21

=== Top half ===
==== Section 1 ====
First round
1	(Chinese Taipei) Tai T-y	21	21
Q2	(United States) I Rusli	10	12
(Chinese Taipei) Sung S-y	18	12
(Indonesia) P K Wardani	21	21
7	(South Korea) Kim G-e	21	24
(Malaysia) Goh J W	7	22
(Ukraine) P Buhrova	17	11
(Denmark) L Kjaersfeldt	21	21

Second round
1	(Chinese Taipei) Tai T-y	2^{r}
(Indonesia) P K Wardani	6
7	(South Korea) Kim G-e	19	21	12
(Denmark) L Kjaersfeldt	21	15	21

Quarter-finals
(Indonesia) P K Wardani	21	21
(Denmark) L Kjaersfeldt	13	12

==== Section 2 ====
First round
4	(Indonesia) G M Tunjung	21	21
PFQ	(Chinese Taipei) Lee Y-h	12	8
(Chinese Taipei) Chiu P-c	11	8
(Thailand) R Intanon	21	21
PFQ	(Chinese Taipei) Yu C-h	14	11
(Japan) T Miyazaki	21	21
Q4	(Hong Kong) Liang K W	18	14
(Myanmar) Thet Htar T	21	21

Second round
4	(Indonesia) G M Tunjung	12	21	10
(Thailand) R Intanon	21	15	21
(Japan) T Miyazaki	13	21	21
(Myanmar) Thet Htar T	21	12	12

Quarter-finals
(Thailand) R Intanon	18	21	20
(Japan) T Miyazaki	21	17	22

=== Bottom half ===
==== Section 3 ====
First round
(Indonesia) K A Dewi	21	23
(India) T Hemanth	16	21
(Denmark) M Blichfeldt	12	20
SWM	(Thailand) P Chochuwong	21	22
PFQ	(Thailand) P Opatniputh	21	21	16
(Singapore) Yeo J M	23	18	21
(Denmark) J Jakobsen	12	21	16
6	(Thailand) B Ongbamrungphan	21	15	21

Second round
(Indonesia) K A Dewi	13	9
SWM	(Thailand) P Chochuwong	21	21
(Singapore) Yeo J M	15	12
6	(Thailand) B Ongbamrungphan	21	21

Quarter-finals
SWM	(Thailand) P Chochuwong	21	18	21
6	(Thailand) B Ongbamrungphan	18	21	13

==== Section 4 ====
First round
(Hong Kong) Lo S Y	14	21	17
Q3	(Hong Kong) S S Mehta	21	9	21
(India) A Kashyap	15	9
5	(Japan) A Ohori	21	21
(Chinese Taipei) Liang T-y	w	/	o
Q1
(Thailand) P Choeikeewong	11	15
3	(China) Han Y	21	21

Second round
Q3	(Hong Kong) S S Mehta	21	16	12
5	(Japan) A Ohori	9	21	21
(Chinese Taipei) Liang T-y	14	13
3	(China) Han Y	21	21

Quarter-finals
5	(Japan) A Ohori	21	9	15
3	(China) Han Y	17	21	21

== Men's doubles ==
=== Seeds ===
1. (Denmark) Kim Astrup / Anders Skaarup Rasmussen (first round)
2. (Malaysia) Aaron Chia / Soh Wooi Yik (withdrew)
3. (South Korea) Kang Min-hyuk / Seo Seung-jae (champions)
4. (Chinese Taipei) Lee Jhe-huei / Yang Po-hsuan (second round)
5. (Malaysia) Goh Sze Fei / Nur Izzuddin (second round)
6. (Denmark) Rasmus Kjær / Frederik Søgaard (first round)
7. (Malaysia) Man Wei Chong / Tee Kai Wun (quarter-finals)
8. (Malaysia) Choong Hon Jian / Muhammad Haikal (withdrew)

=== Finals ===
Semi-finals
(Chinese Taipei) Chiu Hsiang-chieh (Chinese Taipei) Wang Chi-lin	23	15	16
3	(South Korea) Kang Min-hyuk (South Korea) Seo Seung-jae	21	21	21
(Indonesia) Sabar Karyaman Gutama (Indonesia) Muhammad Reza Pahlevi Isfahani	21	21
(Indonesia) Leo Rolly Carnando (Indonesia) Bagas Maulana	13	17

Final
3	(South Korea) Kang Min-hyuk (South Korea) Seo Seung-jae	21	21
(Indonesia) Sabar Karyaman Gutama (Indonesia) Muhammad Reza Pahlevi Isfahani	13	17

=== Top half ===
==== Section 1 ====
First round
1	(Denmark) K Astrup (Denmark) A S Rasmussen	15	23
PFQ	(China) Huang D (China) Zhou HD	21	25
(Chinese Taipei) Lu C-y (Chinese Taipei) Wei C-w	19	16
(Chinese Taipei) Lin B-w (Chinese Taipei) Su C-h	21	21
6	(Denmark) R Kjær (Denmark) F Søgaard	15	23	19
(Malaysia) N M Azriyn (Malaysia) Tan W K	21	21	21
(Chinese Taipei) Chiu H-c (Chinese Taipei) Wang C-l	24	21
Q2	(Hong Kong) Hung K C (Hong Kong) Lui C W	22	8

Second round
PFQ	(China) Huang D (China) Zhou HD	21	21
(Chinese Taipei) Lin B-w (Chinese Taipei) Su C-h	10	11
(Malaysia) N M Azriyn (Malaysia) Tan W K	21	13	17
(Chinese Taipei) Chiu H-c (Chinese Taipei) Wang C-l	18	21	21

Quarter-finals
PFQ	(China) Huang D (China) Zhou HD	21	17
(Chinese Taipei) Chiu H-c (Chinese Taipei) Wang C-l	23	21

==== Section 2 ====
First round
3	(South Korea) Kang M-h (South Korea) Seo S-j	21	21
Q3	(Malaysia) Kang K X (Malaysia) A Tai	12	17
Q1	(Chinese Taipei) Liu K-h (Chinese Taipei) Yang P-ha	21	14	16
Q4	(Malaysia) Lim T J (Malaysia) Wong T C	13	21	21
5	(Malaysia) Goh S F (Malaysia) N Izzuddin	21	15	24
(Chinese Taipei) Lee F-c (Chinese Taipei) Lee F-j	17	21	22
(Denmark) D Lundgaard (Denmark) M Vestergaard	14	17
(Indonesia) M S Fikri (Indonesia) D Marthin	21	21

Second round
3	(South Korea) Kang M-h (South Korea) Seo S-j	21	23
Q4	(Malaysia) Lim T J (Malaysia) Wong T C	9	21
5	(Malaysia) Goh S F (Malaysia) N Izzuddin	21	19	13
(Indonesia) M S Fikri (Indonesia) D Marthin	16	21	21

Quarter-finals
3	(South Korea) Kang M-h (South Korea) Seo S-j	21	21
(Indonesia) M S Fikri (Indonesia) D Marthin	18	17

=== Bottom half ===
==== Section 3 ====
First round
(China) Chen BY (China) Guo RH	24	21
(South Korea) Choi S-g (South Korea) Heo K-h	22	15
(Indonesia) S K Gutama (Indonesia) M R Isfahani	21	21
SWM	(Indonesia) M Ahsan (Indonesia) H Setiawan	14	15
(Chinese Taipei) Lu M-c (Chinese Taipei) Tang K-w	18	21	19
(China) Xie HN (China) Zeng WH	21	12	21
(Malaysia) J Arif (Malaysia) Yap R K	21	8	11
7	(Malaysia) Man W C (Malaysia) Tee K W	15	21	21

Second round
(China) Chen BY (China) Guo RH	14	17
(Indonesia) S K Gutama (Indonesia) M R Isfahani	21	21
(China) Xie HN (China) Zeng WH	11	18
7	(Malaysia) Man W C (Malaysia) Tee K W	21	21

Quarter-finals
(Indonesia) S K Gutama (Indonesia) M R Isfahani	21	21
7	(Malaysia) Man W C (Malaysia) Tee K W	18	15

==== Section 4 ====
First round
PFQ	(South Korea) Kim G-j (South Korea) Kim S-r	21	21
(Hong Kong) Law C H (Hong Kong) Yeung S C	17	19
(China) Chen XJ (China) Liu Y	21	18	21
SWM	(Malaysia) Ong Y S (Malaysia) Teo E Y	14	21	19
(Indonesia) L R Carnando (Indonesia) B Maulana	21	21
(France) C Popov (France) T J Popov	11	17
(Chinese Taipei) Chiang C-w (Chinese Taipei) Wu H-y	18	16
4	(Chinese Taipei) Lee J-h (Chinese Taipei) Yang P-hs	21	21

Second round
PFQ	(South Korea) Kim G-j (South Korea) Kim S-r	15	21	21
(China) Chen XJ (China) Liu Y	21	14	16
(Indonesia) L R Carnando (Indonesia) B Maulana	21	14	22
4	(Chinese Taipei) Lee J-h (Chinese Taipei) Yang P-hs	18	21	20

Quarter-finals
PFQ	(South Korea) Kim G-j (South Korea) Kim S-r	13	9
(Indonesia) L R Carnando (Indonesia) B Maulana	21	21

== Women's doubles ==
=== Seeds ===
1. (South Korea) Baek Ha-na / Lee So-hee (semi-finals)
2. (China) Liu Shengshu / Tan Ning (final)
3. (Malaysia) Pearly Tan / Thinaah Muralitharan (champions)
4. (South Korea) Kim So-yeong / Kong Hee-yong (semi-finals)
5. (South Korea) Jeong Na-eun / Kim Hye-jeong (quarter-finals)
6. (Hong Kong) Yeung Nga Ting / Yeung Pui Lam (first round)
7. (Thailand) Benyapa Aimsaard / Nuntakarn Aimsaard (second round)
8. (Indonesia) Febriana Dwipuji Kusuma / Amallia Cahaya Pratiwi (quarter-finals)

=== Finals ===
Semi-finals
1	(South Korea) Baek Ha-na (South Korea) Lee So-hee	20	21	15
3	(Malaysia) Pearly Tan (Malaysia) Thinaah Muralitharan	22	17	21
4	(South Korea) Kim So-yeong (South Korea) Kong Hee-yong	12	21	16
2	(China) Liu Shengshu (China) Tan Ning	21	18	21

Final
3	(Malaysia) Pearly Tan (Malaysia) Thinaah Muralitharan	21	21
2	(China) Liu Shengshu (China) Tan Ning	14	14

=== Top half ===
==== Section 1 ====
First round
(Chinese Taipei) Hsieh P-s (Chinese Taipei) Hung E-t	21	21
(India) R Panda (India) S Panda	11	8
6	(Hong Kong) Yeung N T (Hong Kong) Yeung P L	18	17
(South Korea) Lee Y-l (South Korea) Shin S-c	21	21
(Hong Kong) Leung Y Y (Hong Kong) Ng W Y	21	21
(Chinese Taipei) N G Chan (Chinese Taipei) Lin C-c	13	16

Second round
1	(South Korea) Baek H-n (South Korea) Lee S-h	21	18	21
(Chinese Taipei) Hsieh P-s (Chinese Taipei) Hung E-t	15	21	16
(South Korea) Lee Y-l (South Korea) Shin S-c	17	21	21
(Hong Kong) Leung Y Y (Hong Kong) Ng W Y	21	13	18

Quarter-finals
1	(South Korea) Baek H-n (South Korea) Lee S-h	21	21
(South Korea) Lee Y-l (South Korea) Shin S-c	8	18

==== Section 2 ====
First round
(Hong Kong) Lui L L (Hong Kong) Tsang H Y	18	21	21
(Chinese Taipei) Hu L-f (Chinese Taipei) Jheng Y-c	21	15	16
8	(Indonesia) F D Kusuma (Indonesia) A C Pratiwi	21	21
(Malaysia) Go P K (Malaysia) Teoh M X	10	12
(Hong Kong) Fan K Y (Hong Kong) Yau M Y	25	21
(Canada) J Cheung (Canada) C Choi	23	6

Second round
3	(Malaysia) P Tan (Malaysia) Thinaah M	21	21
(Hong Kong) Lui L L (Hong Kong) Tsang H Y	16	14
8	(Indonesia) F D Kusuma (Indonesia) A C Pratiwi	21	21
(Hong Kong) Fan K Y (Hong Kong) Yau M Y	8	17

Quarter-finals
3	(Malaysia) P Tan (Malaysia) Thinaah M	21	21
8	(Indonesia) F D Kusuma (Indonesia) A C Pratiwi	14	13

=== Bottom half ===
==== Section 3 ====
First round
(China) Li YJ (China) Luo XM	16	21	19
(China) Li WM (China) Zhang SX	21	19	21
(Chinese Taipei) Cheng Y-p (Chinese Taipei) Sun Y-h	14	14
7	(Thailand) B Aimsaard (Thailand) N Aimsaard	21	21
(Chinese Taipei) Lin X-m (Chinese Taipei) Wang Y-q	12	21	25
(Chinese Taipei) Hsu Y-h (Chinese Taipei) Lin J-y	21	17	23
(Chinese Taipei) Hsu Y-c (Chinese Taipei) Sung Y-h	12	20
4	(South Korea) Kim S-y (South Korea) Kong H-y	21	22

Second round
(China) Li WM (China) Zhang SX	21	21
7	(Thailand) B Aimsaard (Thailand) N Aimsaard	18	13
(Chinese Taipei) Lin X-m (Chinese Taipei) Wang Y-q	15	12
4	(South Korea) Kim S-y (South Korea) Kong H-y	21	21

Quarter-finals
(China) Li WM (China) Zhang SX	19	15
4	(South Korea) Kim S-y (South Korea) Kong H-y	21	21

==== Section 4 ====
First round
(Chinese Taipei) Chang C-h (Chinese Taipei) Yang C-t	13	20
(Chinese Taipei) Teng C-h (Chinese Taipei) Yang C-y	21	22
(Chinese Taipei) Sung S-y (Chinese Taipei) Yu C-h	18	21	12
5	(South Korea) Jeong N-e (South Korea) Kim H-j	21	18	21
(Ukraine) P Buhrova (Ukraine) Y Kantemyr	14	13
(India) G Gopichand (India) T Jolly	21	21

Second round
(Chinese Taipei) Teng C-h (Chinese Taipei) Yang C-y	21	8	14
5	(South Korea) Jeong N-e (South Korea) Kim H-j	16	21	21
(India) G Gopichand (India) T Jolly	11	20
2	(China) Liu SS (China) Tan N	21	22

Quarter-finals
5	(South Korea) Jeong N-e (South Korea) Kim H-j	10	16
2	(China) Liu SS (China) Tan N	21	21

== Mixed doubles ==
=== Seeds ===
1. (China) Feng Yanzhe / Huang Dongping (final)
2. (China) Jiang Zhenbang / Wei Yaxin (champions)
3. (Hong Kong) Tang Chun Man / Tse Ying Suet (semi-finals)
4. (Malaysia) Chen Tang Jie / Toh Ee Wei (semi-finals)
5. (Chinese Taipei) Ye Hong-wei / Lee Chia-hsin (withdrew)
6. (China) Guo Xinwa / Chen Fanghui (quarter-finals)
7. (Malaysia) Tan Kian Meng / Lai Pei Jing (first round)
8. (Malaysia) Goh Soon Huat / Shevon Jemie Lai (quarter-finals)

=== Finals ===
Semi-finals
1	(China) Feng Yanzhe (China) Huang Dongping	21	23
4	(Malaysia) Chen Tang Jie (Malaysia) Toh Ee Wei	14	21
3	(Hong Kong) Tang Chun Man (Hong Kong) Tse Ying Suet	12	6
2	(China) Jiang Zhenbang (China) Wei Yaxin	21	21

Final
1	(China) Feng Yanzhe (China) Huang Dongping	17	19
2	(China) Jiang Zhenbang (China) Wei Yaxin	21	21

=== Top half ===
==== Section 1 ====
First round
1	(China) Feng YZ (China) Huang DP	21	21
(Thailand) R Oupthong (Thailand) J Sudjaipraparat	15	10
(Chinese Taipei) Wu H-y (Chinese Taipei) Yang C-y	21	21
(Ukraine) O Titov (Ukraine) Y Kantemyr	15	17
SWM	(Singapore) T Hee (Singapore) J Tan	17	16
(Malaysia) Hoo P R (Malaysia) Cheng S Y	21	21
(Chinese Taipei) Lin B-w (Chinese Taipei) Lin C-c	21	21
Q3	(Chinese Taipei) Liu K-h (Chinese Taipei) Jheng Y-c	17	9

Second round
1	(China) Feng YZ (China) Huang DP	21	21
(Chinese Taipei) Wu H-y (Chinese Taipei) Yang C-y	14	12
(Malaysia) Hoo P R (Malaysia) Cheng S Y	21	21
(Chinese Taipei) Lin B-w (Chinese Taipei) Lin C-c	14	15

Quarter-finals
1	(China) Feng YZ (China) Huang DP	21	21
(Malaysia) Hoo P R (Malaysia) Cheng S Y	13	11

==== Section 2 ====
First round
4	(Malaysia) Chen T J (Malaysia) Toh E W	21	21
Q2	(Chinese Taipei) Chiu H-c (Chinese Taipei) Lin J-y	8	18
(Malaysia) Wong T C (Malaysia) Lim C S	16	21	14
(Hong Kong) Lee C H (Hong Kong) Ng T Y	21	19	21
6	(China) Guo XW (China) Chen FH	21	21
(Chinese Taipei) Yang P-hs (Chinese Taipei) Hu L-f	9	11
(Chinese Taipei) Wei C-w (Chinese Taipei) N G Chan	22	17	15
(Hong Kong) Lui C W (Hong Kong) Fu C Y	20	21	21

Second round
4	(Malaysia) Chen T J (Malaysia) Toh E W	21	4
(Hong Kong) Lee C H (Hong Kong) Ng T Y	14	1^{r}
6	(China) Guo XW (China) Chen FH	21	21
(Hong Kong) Lui C W (Hong Kong) Fu C Y	13	15

Quarter-finals
4	(Malaysia) Chen T J (Malaysia) Toh E W	21	17	21
6	(China) Guo XW (China) Chen FH	13	21	10

=== Bottom half ===
==== Section 3 ====
First round
(India) K Tarun (India) S K Kudaravalli	9	10
(India) B S Reddy (India) N S Reddy	21	21
Q1	(South Korea) Ko S-h (South Korea) Eom H-w	11	14
8	(Malaysia) Goh S H (Malaysia) S J Lai	21	21
(Malaysia) Yap R K (Malaysia) V Siow	21	21
Q4	(Hong Kong) Deng C F (Hong Kong) Leung Y Y	11	16
PFQ	(Chinese Taipei) Wang C-l (Chinese Taipei) Hsu Y-h	20	17
3	(Hong Kong) Tang C M (Hong Kong) Tse Y S	22	21

Second round
(India) B S Reddy (India) N S Reddy	11	20
8	(Malaysia) Goh S H (Malaysia) S J Lai	21	22
(Malaysia) Yap R K (Malaysia) V Siow	21	19	15
3	(Hong Kong) Tang C M (Hong Kong) Tse Y S	16	21	21

Quarter-finals
8	(Malaysia) Goh S H (Malaysia) S J Lai	18	17
3	(Hong Kong) Tang C M (Hong Kong) Tse Y S	21	21

==== Section 4 ====
First round
(India) A Surya (India) A Pramuthesh	16	20
(Chinese Taipei) Lu M-c (Chinese Taipei) Hung E-t	21	22
(China) Cheng X (China) Zhang C	18	21	21
7	(Malaysia) Tan K M (Malaysia) Lai P J	21	14	11
(Denmark) M Vestergaard (Denmark) C Busch	21	21
PFQ	(Macau) Leong I C (Macau) Ng W C	13	13
(Indonesia) D Ferdinansyah (Indonesia) G E Widjaja	16	21	10
2	(China) Jiang ZB (China) Wei YX	21	18	21

Second round
(Chinese Taipei) Lu M-c (Chinese Taipei) Hung E-t	14	14
(China) Cheng X (China) Zhang C	21	21
(Denmark) M Vestergaard (Denmark) C Busch	21	13
2	(China) Jiang ZB (China) Wei YX	23	21

Quarter-finals
(China) Cheng X (China) Zhang C	17	18
2	(China) Jiang ZB (China) Wei YX	21	21

Preceded by 2024 Taipei Open	BWF World Tour; 2024 BWF season	Succeeded by 2024 China Open
