= Thinaah Muralitharan =

Malaysian doubles badminton player

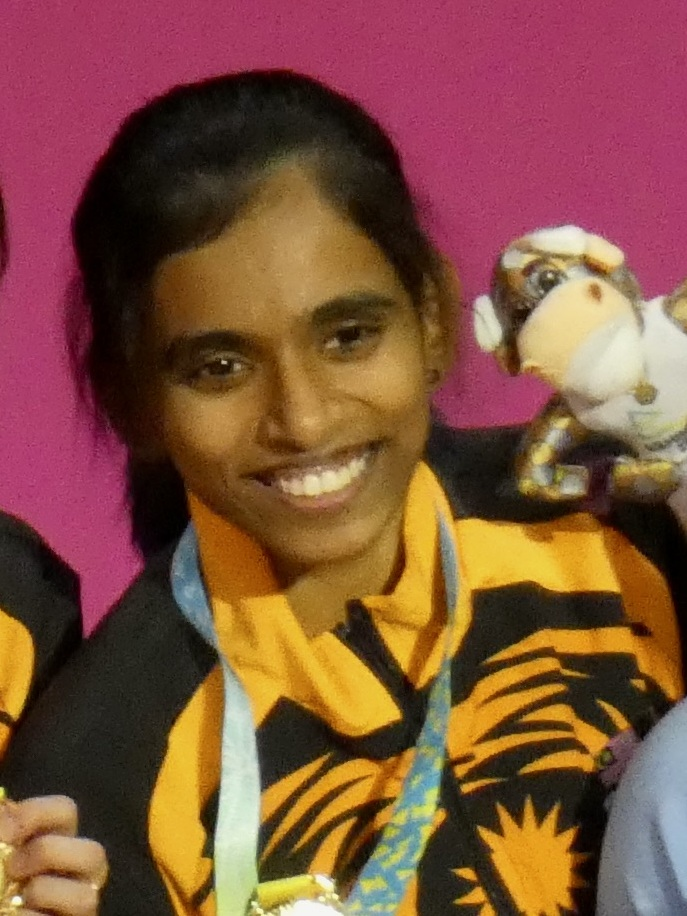
- Thinaah at the 2022 Commonwealth Games medal ceremony.

Personal information
- Born: 3 January 1998 (age 28) Klang, Selangor, Malaysia
- Years active: 2013–present
- Height: 1.64 m (5 ft 5 in)

Sport
- Country: Malaysia
- Sport: Badminton
- Handedness: Right
- Coached by: Rosman Razak

Women's & mixed doubles
- Highest ranking: 2 (WD with Pearly Tan, 29 July 2025); 282 (XD with Tee Kai Wun, 3 March 2020)
- Current ranking: 4 (WD with Pearly Tan, 10 November 2026)
- BWF profile
Medal record
Women's badminton
Representing Malaysia
World Championships
Silver medal – second place	2025 Paris	Women's doubles
Sudirman Cup
Bronze medal – third place	2021 Vantaa	Mixed team
Bronze medal – third place	2023 Suzhou	Mixed team
Commonwealth Games
Gold medal – first place	2022 Birmingham	Women's doubles
Gold medal – first place	2022 Birmingham	Mixed team
Asian Games
Bronze medal – third place	2026 Aichi–Nagoya	Women's doubles
Asia Team Championships
Bronze medal – third place	2020 Manila	Women's team
Bronze medal – third place	2022 Selangor	Women's team
SEA Games
Gold medal – first place	2025 Thailand	Women's doubles
Bronze medal – third place	2025 Thailand	Women's team
World Junior Championships
Silver medal – second place	2016 Bilbao	Mixed team

Thinaah Muralitharan KMN BKS (Tamil: தீனா முரளிதரன்; born 3 January 1998) is a Malaysian badminton player. She and her partner Pearly Tan won the women's doubles silver medals at the 2025 World Championships and reached the women's doubles semi-finals at the 2024 Summer Olympics. They also won gold medals in both the women's doubles and the mixed team events at the 2022 Commonwealth Games as well as in the women's doubles event at the 2025 SEA Games. They became the first ever Malaysian World Championship medalists and Olympic semi-finalists in the women's doubles event. Their results at the World Championships and the Olympic Games made them the most successful Malaysian badminton women's doubles pair in the history.

== Career ==
In 2021, Thinaah and Tan clinched their first BWF World Tour title at the Swiss Open.

In 2022, Thinaah and Tan claimed the French Open title, becoming the first ever Malaysian women's doubles pair to achieve this feat.

Thinaah and her partner Tan best result in 2023 were finalists in the Malaysia Masters and Hong Kong Open.

Thinaah and Tan became the first ever Malaysian women's doubles pair to advance to the semi-finals of an Olympic Games at the 2024 Paris Olympics. Ranked 13th in the world at the time, they were drawn alongside Chen Qingchen and Jia Yifan from China, Mayu Matsumoto and Wakana Nagahara from Japan, and Apriyani Rahayu and Siti Fadia Silva Ramadhanti from Indonesia, ranked 1st, 6th, and 9th in the world respectively. Having successfully advanced from the group stage with a 2–1 record, they defeated then ranked 7th in the world Kim So-yeong and Kong Hee-yong from Korea in the quarter-finals in straight sets, before falling to Chen and Jia in the semi-finals and Japan's Nami Matsuyama and Chiharu Shida in the bronze medal match.

Thinaah and Tan reached their first final in 2024 at the Korea Open, finished as runner-up to home pair Jeong Na-eun and Kim Hye-jeong.

In 2025, Thinaah enjoyed a breakthrough season alongside her women's doubles partner Pearly Tan, achieving historic and consistent success on the world stage. The duo became the first Malaysia women's doubles to reach the final of the BWF World Championships, capturing the silver medal. They also secured multiple BWF World Tour title, including victories at the Thailand Open, Arctic Open, and Japan Masters. Their strong performances led them to occupy the BWF ranking of number 2 in July 2025, and qualified for the Tour Finals in Hangzhou and reached the semi-final. Thinaah and Tan also ended Malaysia's long wait for women's doubles gold at the SEA Games.

The next year, Thinaah and Tan won their first title in the Indonesia Masters by January.

== Personal life ==
Thinaah is the second child of S. Muralitharan and Parimala Devi Kalalingam. She has an older brother and a younger sister, Selinaah Muralitharan, who is a former Selangor state shuttler. She is fluent in all four main languages spoken in Malaysia: Tamil, Malay, English, and Mandarin, in which she picked up from her ethnic Chinese friends whilst studying at Bukit Jalil Sports School. In October 2024, Thinaah graduated with a Bachelor of Education in Teaching English as a Second Language (TESL) at Open University Malaysia. She was also conferred a special sports icon award during the convocation.

== Awards ==
Year	Award	Category	Result
2022	Selangor Sports Awards	2021–2022 Selangor Sportswoman	Won
2022	National Sports Awards	National women's team (with Pearly Tan)	Won
2023	Nambikkai Star Icon Awards	Best Sports Personality	Won
2024	Dr. Ambedkar International Award		Won
2024	Open University Malaysia 28th Convocation	Sports Icon	Won

== Honours ==
=== Honours of Malaysia ===
- Malaysia
  - Officer of the Order of the Defender of the Realm (KMN) (2026).
- Selangor
  - Bintang Kecemerlangan Sukan Selangor (BKS) (2023).

== Achievements ==
=== World Championships ===
Women's doubles
Year	Venue	Partner	Opponent	Score	Result	Ref.
2025	Adidas Arena; Paris, France	(Malaysia) Pearly Tan	(China) Liu Shengshu (China) Tan Ning	14–21, 22–20, 17–21	Silver	

=== Commonwealth Games ===
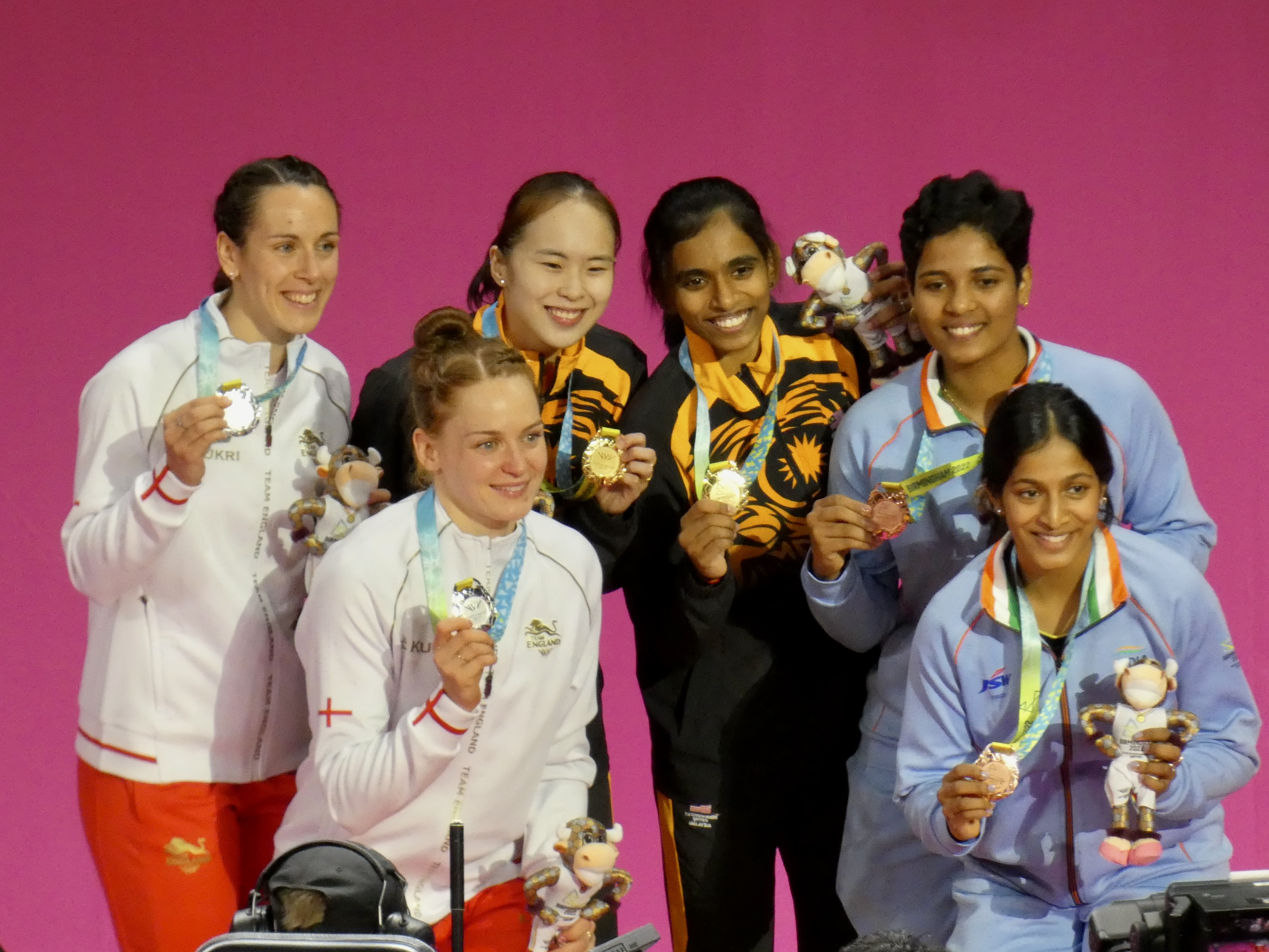
The six medallists in the women's badminton doubles at the 2022 Commonwealth Games in Birmingham. Left to right: Chloe Birch and Lauren Smith (England), Pearly Tan and Thinaah Muralitharan (Malaysia), Treesa Jolly and Gayathri Gopichand (India).

Women's doubles
Year	Venue	Partner	Opponent	Score	Result	Ref.
2022	National Exhibition Centre; Birmingham, England	(Malaysia) Pearly Tan	(England) Chloe Birch (England) Lauren Smith	21–5, 21–8	Gold	

=== Asian Games ===
Women's doubles
Year	Venue	Partner	Opponent	Score	Result	Ref.
2026	Ichinomiya City Municipal Gymnasium, Ichinomiya, Japan	(Malaysia) Pearly Tan	(China) Liu Shengshu (China) Tan Ning	21–16, 20–22, 12–21	Bronze	

=== SEA Games ===
Women's doubles
Year	Venue	Partner	Opponent	Score	Result	Ref.
2025	Gymnasium 4, Thammasat University Rangsit Campus; Pathum Thani, Thailand	(Malaysia) Pearly Tan	(Indonesia) Febriana Dwipuji Kusuma (Indonesia) Meilysa Trias Puspita Sari	21–16, 19–21, 21–17	Gold	

=== BWF World Tour (9 titles, 9 runners-up) ===
The BWF World Tour, which was announced on 19 March 2017 and implemented in 2018, is a series of elite badminton tournaments sanctioned by the Badminton World Federation (BWF). The BWF World Tours are divided into levels of World Tour Finals, Super 1000, Super 750, Super 500, Super 300, and the BWF Tour Super 100.

Women's doubles
Year	Tournament	Level	Partner	Opponent	Score	Result	Ref.
2021	Swiss Open	Super 300	(Malaysia) Pearly Tan	(Bulgaria) Gabriela Stoeva (Bulgaria) Stefani Stoeva	21–19, 21–12	(gold) Winner	
2022	French Open	Super 750	(Malaysia) Pearly Tan	(Japan) Mayu Matsumoto (Japan) Wakana Nagahara	21–19, 18–21, 21–15	(gold) Winner	
2023	Malaysia Masters	Super 500	(Malaysia) Pearly Tan	(South Korea) Baek Ha-na (South Korea) Lee So-hee	20–22, 21–8, 17–21	(silver) Runner-up	
2023	Hong Kong Open	Super 500	(Malaysia) Pearly Tan	(Indonesia) Apriyani Rahayu (Indonesia) Siti Fadia Silva Ramadhanti	21–14, 22–24, 9–21	(silver) Runner-up	
2024	Korea Open	Super 500	(Malaysia) Pearly Tan	(South Korea) Jeong Na-eun (South Korea) Kim Hye-jeong	12–21, 11–21	(silver) Runner-up	
2024	Hong Kong Open	Super 500	(Malaysia) Pearly Tan	(China) Liu Shengshu (China) Tan Ning	21–14, 21–14	(gold) Winner	
2024	Arctic Open	Super 500	(Malaysia) Pearly Tan	(China) Liu Shengshu (China) Tan Ning	12–21, 17–21	(silver) Runner-up	
2025	Indonesia Masters	Super 500	(Malaysia) Pearly Tan	(South Korea) Kim Hye-jeong (South Korea) Kong Hee-yong	12–21, 21–17, 18–21	(silver) Runner-up	
2025	Thailand Open	Super 500	(Malaysia) Pearly Tan	(South Korea) Jeong Na-eun (South Korea) Lee Yeon-woo	21–16, 21–17	(gold) Winner	
2025	Indonesia Open	Super 1000	(Malaysia) Pearly Tan	(China) Liu Shengshu (China) Tan Ning	25–23, 12–21, 19–21	(silver) Runner-up	
2025	Japan Open	Super 750	(Malaysia) Pearly Tan	(China) Liu Shengshu (China) Tan Ning	15–21, 14–21	(silver) Runner-up	
2025	Arctic Open	Super 500	(Malaysia) Pearly Tan	(Japan) Rin Iwanaga (Japan) Kie Nakanishi	21–7, 21–9	(gold) Winner	
2025	Japan Masters	Super 500	(Malaysia) Pearly Tan	(Japan) Rin Iwanaga (Japan) Kie Nakanishi	22–20, 21–19	(gold) Winner	
2026	Indonesia Masters	Super 500	(Malaysia) Pearly Tan	(Japan) Arisa Igarashi (Japan) Miyu Takahashi	Walkover	(gold) Winner	
2026	Taipei Open	Super 300	(Malaysia) Pearly Tan	(Japan) Sumire Nakade (Japan) Miyu Takahashi	16–21, 18–21	(silver) Runner-up	
2026	Denmark Open	Super 750	(Malaysia) Pearly Tan	(Japan) Hinata Suzuki (Japan) Nao Yamakita	21–18, 21–11	(gold) Winner	
2026	French Open	Super 750	(Malaysia) Pearly Tan	(Japan) Yuki Fukushima (Japan) Mayu Matsumoto	21–10, 17–21, 16–21	(silver) Runner-up	
2026	Hong Kong Open	Super 500	(Malaysia) Pearly Tan	(Japan) Sumire Nakade (Japan) Miyu Takahashi	22–20, 21–16	(gold) Winner	

=== BWF International Challenge/Series (5 titles, 2 runners-up) ===
Women's singles
Year	Tournament	Opponent	Score	Result
2018	Iran Fajr International	(Malaysia) Lee Ying Ying	11–8, 11–6, 9–11, 11–9	(gold) Winner
2018	Dutch International	(Denmark) Julie Dawall Jakobsen	21–17, 15–21, 11–21	(silver) Runner-up

Women's doubles
Year	Tournament	Partner	Opponent	Score	Result
2018	Malaysia International	(Malaysia) Payee Lim Peiy Yee	(Chinese Taipei) Cheng Yu-chieh (Chinese Taipei) Chung Kan-yu	21–17, 21–14	(gold) Winner
2019	Malaysia International	(Malaysia) Pearly Tan	(Indonesia) Febriana Dwipuji Kusuma (Indonesia) Ribka Sugiarto	21–16, 11–21, 21–18	(gold) Winner
2019	Sydney International	(Malaysia) Pearly Tan	(Chinese Taipei) Cheng Yu-chieh (Chinese Taipei) Tseng Yu-chi	17–21, 21–17, 13–21	(silver) Runner-up
2019	India International	(Malaysia) Pearly Tan	(Malaysia) Teoh Mei Xing (Malaysia) Yap Ling	21–18, 21–14	(gold) Winner
2019	Bangladesh International	(Malaysia) Pearly Tan	(India) K. Maneesha (India) Rutaparna Panda	22–20, 21–19	(gold) Winner

BWF International Challenge tournament
BWF International Series tournament
