= 2025 BWF World Championships – Women's doubles =

Badminton championships

Women's doubles at the 2025 BWF World Championships
- Venue: Adidas Arena
- Location: Paris, France
- Dates: 25–31 August
- Competitors: 96 from 29 nations

Medalists
gold medal	Liu Shengshu; Tan Ning	China
silver medal	Pearly Tan; Thinaah Muralitharan	Malaysia
bronze medal	Rin Iwanaga; Kie Nakanishi	Japan
bronze medal	Nami Matsuyama; Chiharu Shida	Japan

The women's doubles tournament of the 2025 BWF World Championships took place from 25 to 31 August 2025 at the Adidas Arena in Paris.

== Seeds ==
The seeding list was based on the World Rankings of 5 August 2025.

1. (China) Liu Shengshu / Tan Ning (champions)
2. (Malaysia) Pearly Tan / Thinaah Muralitharan (final)
3. (Japan) Nami Matsuyama / Chiharu Shida (semi-finals)
4. (South Korea) Baek Ha-na / Lee So-hee (third round)
5. (South Korea) Kim Hye-jeong / Kong Hee-yong (quarter-finals)
6. (China) Jia Yifan / Zhang Shuxian (quarter-finals)
7. (China) Li Yijing / Luo Xumin (third round)
8. (Japan) Yuki Fukushima / Mayu Matsumoto (third round)

9. (Japan) Rin Iwanaga / Kie Nakanishi (semi-finals)
10. (Indonesia) Febriana Dwipuji Kusuma / Amallia Cahaya Pratiwi (quarter-finals)
11. (Chinese Taipei) Hsieh Pei-shan / Hung En-tzu (third round)
12. (Indonesia) Lanny Tria Mayasari / Siti Fadia Silva Ramadhanti (third round)
13. (Chinese Taipei) Hsu Yin-hui / Lin Jhih-yun (third round)
14. (Chinese Taipei) Chang Ching-hui / Yang Ching-tun (third round)
15. (Hong Kong) Yeung Nga Ting / Yeung Pui Lam (third round)
16. (Malaysia) Go Pei Kee / Teoh Mei Xing (second round)

Click on the seed number of a player to go to their draw section.

== Draw ==
The drawing ceremony was held on 14 August 2023.

=== Finals ===
Semi-finals
1	(China) Liu Shengshu (China) Tan Ning	21	21
9	(Japan) Rin Iwanaga (Japan) Kie Nakanishi	15	4
3	(Japan) Nami Matsuyama (Japan) Chiharu Shida	21	13	12
2	(Malaysia) Pearly Tan (Malaysia) Thinaah Muralitharan	14	21	21

Final
1	(China) Liu Shengshu (China) Tan Ning	21	20	21
2	(Malaysia) Pearly Tan (Malaysia) Thinaah Muralitharan	14	22	17

=== Top half ===
==== Section 1 ====
First round
(Switzerland) L Amiguet (Switzerland) C Racloz	14	21	21
(Poland) P Hankiewicz (Poland) K Marczak	21	13	13
(Austria) S Au Yeong (Austria) A Hagspiel	13	10
(Spain) P López (Spain) L Rodríguez	21	21
(Germany) S Hübsch (Germany) A Lehmann	21	21
(Brazil) J Lima (Brazil) S Lima	19	18
(Philippines) N Albo (Philippines) E Inlayo	21	21
(United Arab Emirates) T Khan (United Arab Emirates) M O Khan	12	7

Second round
1	(China) Liu SS (China) Tan N	21	21
(Switzerland) L Amiguet (Switzerland) C Racloz	8	4
14	(Chinese Taipei) Chang C-h (Chinese Taipei) Yang C-t	21	21
(Spain) P López (Spain) L Rodríguez	15	11
6	(China) Jia YF (China) Zhang SX	21	21
(Germany) S Hübsch (Germany) A Lehmann	3	5
13	(Chinese Taipei) Hsu Y-h (Chinese Taipei) Lin J-y	21	21
(Philippines) A M N Albo (Philippines) E C Inlayo	15	13

Third round
1	(China) Liu SS (China) Tan N	21	21
14	(Chinese Taipei) Chang C-h (Chinese Taipei) Yang C-t	8	15
6	(China) Jia YF (China) Zhang SX	21	21
13	(Chinese Taipei) Hsu Y-h (Chinese Taipei) Lin J-y	15	14

Quarter-finals
1	(China) Liu SS (China) Tan N	19	21	21
6	(China) Jia YF (China) Zhang SX	21	16	9

==== Section 2 ====
First round
(India) P Konjengbam (India) S Mishra	17	16
(France) M Lambert (France) C Pognante	21	21
(Scotland) J MacPherson (Scotland) C Torrance	21	21
(Sri Lanka) I Attanayake (Sri Lanka) S de Silva	7	8
(Bulgaria) M Chepisheva (Bulgaria) T Popivanova	6	12
(Ukraine) P Buhrova (Ukraine) Y Kantemyr	21	21
(Uganda) F M Rafi (Uganda) T Naluwooza	2	14
(Netherlands) K de Wit (Ukraine) M Stoliarenko	21	21

Second round
4	(South Korea) Baek H-n (South Korea) Lee S-h	21	17	21
(France) M Lambert (France) C Pognante	11	21	17
10	(Indonesia) F D Kusuma (Indonesia) A C Pratiwi	21	21
(Scotland) J MacPherson (Scotland) C Torrance	17	14
7	(China) Li YJ (China) Luo XM	21	21
(Ukraine) P Buhrova (Ukraine) Y Kantemyr	11	16
9	(Japan) R Iwanaga (Japan) K Nakanishi	21	21
(Netherlands) K de Wit (Ukraine) M Stoliarenko	8	10

Third round
4	(South Korea) Baek H-n (South Korea) Lee S-h	16	15
10	(Indonesia) F D Kusuma (Indonesia) A C Pratiwi	21	21
7	(China) Li YJ (China) Luo XM	16	18
9	(Japan) R Iwanaga (Japan) K Nakanishi	21	21

Quarter-finals
10	(Indonesia) F D Kusuma (Indonesia) A C Pratiwi	15	16
9	(Japan) R Iwanaga (Japan) K Nakanishi	21	21

=== Bottom half ===
==== Section 3 ====
First round
(England) A Harris (England) L Tolman	21	14	21
(Spain) N Carulla (Spain) C M Jiménez	16	21	19
(England) S Kelly (England) A Lado	13	10
(United States) L Lam (United States) A Lee	21	21
(Chinese Taipei) Sung S-y (Chinese Taipei) Yu C-h	21	21
(Republic of Ireland) O Flynn (Republic of Ireland) M Ryan	8	9
(Turkey) B Erçetin (Turkey) N İnci	w	/	o
(Japan) M Otake (Japan) M Takahashi

Second round
(England) A Harris (England) L Tolman	9	6
11	(Chinese Taipei) Hsieh P-s (Chinese Taipei) Hung E-t	21	21
(United States) L Lam (United States) A Lee	19	9
5	(South Korea) Kim H-j (South Korea) Kong H-y	21	21
(Chinese Taipei) Sung S-y (Chinese Taipei) Yu C-h	15	15
15	(Hong Kong) Yeung N T (Hong Kong) Yeung P L	21	21
(Turkey) B Erçetin (Turkey) N İnci	9	12
3	(Japan) N Matsuyama (Japan) C Shida	21	21

Third round
11	(Chinese Taipei) Hsieh P-s (Chinese Taipei) Hung E-t	17	6
5	(South Korea) Kim H-j (South Korea) Kong H-y	21	21
15	(Hong Kong) Yeung N T (Hong Kong) Yeung P L	13	16
3	(Japan) N Matsuyama (Japan) C Shida	21	21

Quarter-finals
5	(South Korea) Kim H-j (South Korea) Kong H-y	17	14
3	(Japan) N Matsuyama (Japan) C Shida	21	21

==== Section 4 ====
First round
(Bulgaria) G Stoeva (Bulgaria) S Stoeva	21	21
(India) R Panda (India) S Panda	12	11
(Thailand) L Kanlaha (Thailand) P Muenwong	20	21	11
(Australia) G Somerville (Australia) A Yu	22	17	21
(France) T Margueritte (France) F Vallet	21	21
(Sri Lanka) H Ambalangodage (Sri Lanka) H Wijayarathne	18	16
(Hong Kong) Lui L L (Hong Kong) Tsang H Y	21	21
(Switzerland) C Brand (Switzerland) J Franconville	10	10

Second round
(Bulgaria) G Stoeva (Bulgaria) S Stoeva	21	21
16	(Malaysia) Go P K (Malaysia) Teoh M X	11	9
(Australia) G Somerville (Australia) A Yu	19	18
8	(Japan) Y Fukushima (Japan) M Matsumoto	21	21
(France) T Margueritte (France) F Vallet	13	12
12	(Indonesia) L T Mayasari (Indonesia) S F S Ramadhanti	21	21
(Hong Kong) Lui L L (Hong Kong) Tsang H Y	17	14
2	(Malaysia) P Tan (Malaysia) Thinaah M	21	21

Third round
(Bulgaria) G Stoeva (Bulgaria) S Stoeva	21	20	22
8	(Japan) Y Fukushima (Japan) M Matsumoto	18	22	20
12	(Indonesia) L T Mayasari (Indonesia) S F S Ramadhanti	12	11
2	(Malaysia) P Tan (Malaysia) Thinaah M	21	21

Quarter-finals
(Bulgaria) G Stoeva (Bulgaria) S Stoeva	15	10
2	(Malaysia) P Tan (Malaysia) Thinaah M	21	21

== Qualifiers' performances ==
The table below lists out all the qualifiers of this edition by 26 July 2025.

Pair	Date of birth	Pair statistics			Individual statistics			Note
Pair	Date of birth	Appearance	Best Performance(s)		Appearance	Best Performance(s)		Note
Pair	Date of birth	Appearance	Edition(s)	Result	Appearance	Edition(s)	Result	Note
Champions
	Missing required parameter 1=month! (aged −1)							
	Missing required parameter 1=month! (aged −1)							
Finalist
	Missing required parameter 1=month! (aged −1)							
	Missing required parameter 1=month! (aged −1)							
Semi-finalist
	Missing required parameter 1=month! (aged −1)							
	Missing required parameter 1=month! (aged −1)							
(Japan) Nami Matsuyama	28 June 1998 (aged 27)	4th	21, 22, 23	QF	4th	21, 22, 23	QF	PB
(Japan) Chiharu Shida	29 April 1997 (aged 28)	4th	21, 22, 23	QF	4th	21, 22, 23	QF	PB
Quarter-finalist
	Missing required parameter 1=month! (aged −1)							
	Missing required parameter 1=month! (aged −1)							
(Indonesia) Febriana Dwipuji Kusuma	20 February 2001 (aged 24)	3rd	23	3R	3rd	23	3R	PB
(Indonesia) Amallia Cahaya Pratiwi	14 October 2001 (aged 23)	3rd	23	3R	3rd	23	3R	PB
	Missing required parameter 1=month! (aged −1)							
	Missing required parameter 1=month! (aged −1)							
(Bulgaria) Gabriela Stoeva	15 July 1994 (aged 31)	10th	21	QF	10th	21	QF	Most participated pair, =PB
(Bulgaria) Stefani Stoeva	23 September 1995 (aged 29)	10th	21	QF	10th	21	QF	Most participated pair, =PB
Third rounders
	Missing required parameter 1=month! (aged −1)							
	Missing required parameter 1=month! (aged −1)							
	Missing required parameter 1=month! (aged −1)							
	Missing required parameter 1=month! (aged −1)							
(South Korea) Baek Ha-na	22 September 2000 (aged 24)	2nd	23	3R	3rd	23	3R	=PB
(South Korea) Lee So-hee	14 June 1994 (aged 31)	2nd	23	3R	10th	21	S	Most participated qualifier
	Missing required parameter 1=month! (aged −1)							
	Missing required parameter 1=month! (aged −1)							
	Missing required parameter 1=month! (aged −1)							
	Missing required parameter 1=month! (aged −1)							
(Hong Kong) Yeung Nga Ting	13 October 1998 (aged 26)	3rd	23	3R	7th	21, 23	3R	=PB
(Hong Kong) Yeung Pui Lam	26 October 2001 (aged 23)	3rd	23	3R	3rd	23	3R	=PB
	Missing required parameter 1=month! (aged −1)							
	Missing required parameter 1=month! (aged −1)							
(Indonesia) Lanny Tria Mayasari	8 May 2002 (aged 23)				2nd	23	2R	PB
(Indonesia) Siti Fadia Silva Ramadhanti	16 November 2000 (aged 24)				3rd	23	S	
Second rounders
	Missing required parameter 1=month! (aged −1)							
	Missing required parameter 1=month! (aged −1)							
	Missing required parameter 1=month! (aged −1)							
	Missing required parameter 1=month! (aged −1)							
	Missing required parameter 1=month! (aged −1)							
	Missing required parameter 1=month! (aged −1)							
	Missing required parameter 1=month! (aged −1)							
	Missing required parameter 1=month! (aged −1)							
	Missing required parameter 1=month! (aged −1)							
	Missing required parameter 1=month! (aged −1)							
	Missing required parameter 1=month! (aged −1)							
	Missing required parameter 1=month! (aged −1)							
	Missing required parameter 1=month! (aged −1)							
	Missing required parameter 1=month! (aged −1)							
	Missing required parameter 1=month! (aged −1)							
	Missing required parameter 1=month! (aged −1)							
	Missing required parameter 1=month! (aged −1)							
	Missing required parameter 1=month! (aged −1)							
	Missing required parameter 1=month! (aged −1)							
	Missing required parameter 1=month! (aged −1)							
	Missing required parameter 1=month! (aged −1)							
	Missing required parameter 1=month! (aged −1)							
	Missing required parameter 1=month! (aged −1)							
	Missing required parameter 1=month! (aged −1)							
	Missing required parameter 1=month! (aged −1)							
	Missing required parameter 1=month! (aged −1)							
	Missing required parameter 1=month! (aged −1)							
	Missing required parameter 1=month! (aged −1)							
	Missing required parameter 1=month! (aged −1)							
	Missing required parameter 1=month! (aged −1)							
First rounders
(Poland) Paulina Hankiewicz	30 May 2001 (aged 24)	Debut			Debut			PB
(Poland) Kornelia Marczak	8 March 1997 (aged 28)	Debut			Debut			PB
(Austria) Serena Au Yeong	28 August 2000 (aged 24)	Debut			4th	23	2R	
(Austria) Anna Hagspiel	20 August 2001 (aged 24)	Debut			Debut			PB
(Brazil) Jaqueline Lima	23 April 2001 (aged 24)	4th	21, 23	2R	4th	21, 23	2R	
(Brazil) Samia Lima	28 June 2000 (aged 25)	4th	21, 23	2R	4th	21, 23	2R	
(United Arab Emirates) Taabia Khan	14 June 2006 (aged 19)	Debut			Debut			PB
(United Arab Emirates) Mysha Omer Khan	August 2008 (aged 16–17)	Debut			Debut			PB
(India) Priya Konjengbam	11 March 2001 (aged 24)	Debut			Debut			PB
(India) Shruti Mishra	13 August 2002 (aged 23)	Debut			Debut			PB
(Sri Lanka) Isuri Attanayake	18 July 2009 (aged 16)	Debut			Debut			PB
(Sri Lanka) Sithumi de Silva	25 July 2009 (aged 16)	Debut			Debut			PB
(Bulgaria) Mihaela Chepisheva	27 November 2004 (aged 20)	Debut			Debut			PB
(Bulgaria) Tsvetina Popivanova	1 July 2005 (aged 20)	Debut			Debut			PB
(Uganda) Fadilah Mohamed Rafi	6 April 2005 (aged 20)	Debut			Debut			PB
(Uganda) Tracy Naluwooza	6 September 2006 (aged 18)	Debut			Debut			PB
(Spain) Nikol Carulla	30 July 2005 (aged 20)	Debut			Debut			PB
(Spain) Carmen María Jiménez	4 February 2006 (aged 19)	Debut			Debut			PB
(England) Sian Kelly	6 November 2000 (aged 24)	Debut			Debut			PB
(England) Annie Lado	23 February 2002 (aged 23)	Debut			2nd	23	2R	
(Republic of Ireland) Orla Flynn	15 March 2002 (aged 23)	Debut			Debut			PB
(Republic of Ireland) Moya Ryan	25 March 1998 (aged 27)	Debut			3rd	21,22	1R	=PB
(India) Rutaparna Panda	7 May 1999 (aged 26)	Debut			Debut			PB
(India) Swetaparna Panda	29 June 2005 (aged 20)	Debut			Debut			PB
(Thailand) Laksika Kanlaha	17 December 1997 (aged 27)	Debut			Debut			PB
(Thailand) Phataimas Muenwong	5 July 1995 (aged 30)	Debut			4th	18	3R	
(Sri Lanka) Hasini Ambalangodage	20 April 2000 (aged 25)	Debut			Debut			PB
(Sri Lanka) Hasara Wijayarathne	9 June 1999 (aged 26)	Debut			Debut			PB
(Switzerland) Chloé Brand	19 November 2003 (aged 21)	Debut			Debut			PB
(Switzerland) Julie Franconville	28 March 2002 (aged 23)	Debut			Debut			PB
Withdrew
(Japan) Mizuki Otake	27 February 2002 (aged 23)	Debut			Debut			
(Japan) Miyu Takahashi	15 May 2002 (aged 23)	Debut			Debut			
