= 2021 Swiss Open (badminton) =

2021 badminton tournament in Basel

Tournament details
- Dates: 2–7 March
- Level: Super 300
- Total prize money: US$140,000
- Venue: St. Jakobshalle
- Location: Basel, Switzerland

Champions
- Men's singles: (Denmark) Viktor Axelsen
- Women's singles: (Spain) Carolina Marín
- Men's doubles: (Denmark) Kim Astrup (Denmark) Anders Skaarup Rasmussen
- Women's doubles: (Malaysia) Pearly Tan (Malaysia) Thinaah Muralitharan
- Mixed doubles: (France) Thom Gicquel (France) Delphine Delrue

The 2021 Swiss Open (officially known as the Yonex Swiss Open 2021, after its sponsor) was a badminton tournament in St. Jakobshalle in Basel, Switzerland, from 2 to 7 March 2021. It had a purse of $140,000.

== Tournament ==
The 2021 Swiss Open was the first tournament of the 2021 BWF World Tour and also part of the Swiss Open championships which had been held since 1955. This tournament was organized by the Swiss Badminton and sanctioned by the BWF.

=== Venue ===
This international tournament was held at St. Jakobshalle in Basel, Switzerland.

=== Point distribution ===
Below is the point distribution table for each phase of the tournament based on the BWF points system for the BWF World Tour Super 300 event.

Winner	Runner-up	3/4	5/8	9/16	17/32
7,000	5,950	4,900	3,850	2,750	1,670

=== Prize money ===
The total prize money for this tournament was US$140,000. Distribution of prize money was in accordance with BWF regulations.

Event	Winner	Finals	Semi-finals	Quarter-finals	Last 16
Singles	$10,500	$5,320	$2,030	$840	$490
Doubles	$11,060	$5,320	$1,960	$1,015	$525

== Men's singles ==
=== Seeds ===
1. (Denmark) Viktor Axelsen (champion)
2. (Malaysia) Lee Zii Jia (semi-finals)
3. (Denmark) Rasmus Gemke (second round)
4. (India) Srikanth Kidambi (semi-finals)
5. (India) B. Sai Praneeth (quarter-finals)
6. (Thailand) Kantaphon Wangcharoen (quarter-finals)
7. (Indonesia) Shesar Hiren Rhustavito (quarter-finals)
8. (Thailand) Kunlavut Vitidsarn (final)

=== Wild card ===
Swiss Badminton awarded a wild card entry to Christian Kirchmayr of Switzerland.

=== Finals ===
Semi-finals
1	(Denmark) Viktor Axelsen	21	21
4	(India) Srikanth Kidambi	13	19
8	(Thailand) Kunlavut Vitidsarn	21	21
2	(Malaysia) Lee Zii Jia	18	10

Final
1	(Denmark) Viktor Axelsen	21	21
8	(Thailand) Kunlavut Vitidsarn	16	6

=== Top half ===
==== Section 1 ====
First Round
1	(Denmark) V Axelsen	21	21
(Canada) J Ho-Shue	17	7
(Thailand) K Phetpradab	12	21	21
(Republic of Ireland) N Nguyen	21	17	8
7	(Indonesia) S H Rhustavito	21	21
PFR	(Malaysia) Soong J V	15	10
(France) T J Popov	21	20	21
(Canada) B Yang	18	22	23

Second Round
1	(Denmark) V Axelsen	21	21
(Thailand) K Phetpradab	13	7
7	(Indonesia) S H Rhustavito	21	21
(Canada) B Yang	19	13

Quarter-finals
1	(Denmark) V Axelsen	21	21
7	(Indonesia) S H Rhustavito	17	12

==== Section 2 ====
First Round
4	(India) S Kidambi	18	21	21
(India) Sa Verma	21	18	11
(France) T Rouxel	21	21
(Canada) XD Sheng	18	14
6	(Thailand) K Wangcharoen	21	21
(Malaysia) Liew D	12	16
(Netherlands) M Caljouw	21	9	21
(India) Prannoy K	19	21	17

Second Round
4	(India) S Kidambi	21	14	21
(France) T Rouxel	10	21	14
6	(Thailand) K Wangcharoen	21	21
(Netherlands) M Caljouw	9	16

Quarter-finals
4	(India) S Kidambi	21	21
6	(Thailand) K Wangcharoen	19	15

=== Bottom half ===
==== Section 3 ====
First Round
WC	(Switzerland) C Kirchmayr	19	18
(India) So Verma	21	21
(Brazil) Y Coelho	14	10
8	(Thailand) K Vitidsarn	21	21
(India) A Jayaram	21	21
(Thailand) S Thammasin	12	13
(Sweden) F Burestedt	18	19
3	(Denmark) R Gemke	21	21

Second Round
(India) So Verma	17	14
8	(Thailand) K Vitidsarn	21	21
(India) A Jayaram	21	17	21
3	(Denmark) R Gemke	18	21	13

Quarter-finals
8	(Thailand) K Vitidsarn	21	21
(India) A Jayaram	9	6

==== Section 4 ====
First Round
(Spain) P Abián	21	21
(India) Parupalli K	15	10
(Israel) M Zilberman	11	14
5	(India) B. Sai Praneeth	21	21
(India) L Sen	16	12
PFR	(Denmark) V Svendsen	21	21
PFR	(Russia) S Sirant	12	14
2	(Malaysia) Lee Z J	21	21

Second Round
(Spain) P Abián	12	17
5	(India) B. Sai Praneeth	21	21
PFR	(Denmark) V Svendsen	15	11
2	(Malaysia) Lee Z J	21	21

Quarter-finals
5	(India) B. Sai Praneeth	14	17
2	(Malaysia) Lee Z J	21	21

== Women's singles ==
=== Seeds ===
1. (Spain) Carolina Marín (champion)
2. (India) P. V. Sindhu (final)
3. (Thailand) Pornpawee Chochuwong (semi-finals)
4. (Denmark) Mia Blichfeldt (semi-finals)
5. (Thailand) Busanan Ongbamrungphan (quarter-finals)
6. (South Korea) Sung Ji-hyun (second round)
7. (United States) Zhang Beiwen (quarter-finals)
8. (South Korea) Kim Ga-eun (first round)

=== Finals ===
Semi-finals
1	(Spain) Carolina Marín	21	20	21
3	(Thailand) Pornpawee Chochuwong	15	22	19
4	(Denmark) Mia Blichfeldt	20	10
2	(India) P. V. Sindhu	22	21

Final
1	(Spain) Carolina Marín	21	21
2	(India) P. V. Sindhu	12	5

=== Top half ===
==== Section 1 ====
First Round
1	(Spain) C Marín	21	21
(Russia) N Perminova	8	10
(Denmark) J D Jakobsen	21	21
(Switzerland) S Jaquet	12	17
7	(United States) Zhang BW	21	21
(Bulgaria) L Zetchiri	11	11
(Netherlands) S de Visch Eijbergen	20	19
(Turkey) A Demirbağ	22	21

Second Round
1	(Spain) C Marín	21	21
(Denmark) J D Jakobsen	11	10
7	(United States) Zhang BW	21	16	21
(Turkey) A Demirbağ	13	21	9

Quarter-finals
1	(Spain) C Marín	21	21
7	(United States) Zhang BW	13	13

==== Section 2 ====
First Round
3	(Thailand) P Chochuwong	17	21	21
(Estonia) K Kuuba	21	18	18
PFR	(Hungary) L Sárosi	15	24	19
(Denmark) L Kjærsfeldt	21	22	21
8	(South Korea) Kim G-e	21	16	13
(Thailand) S Katethong	12	21	21
(Belgium) L Tan	12	11
(Denmark) L Christophersen	21	21

Second Round
3	(Thailand) P Chochuwong	17	21	21
(Denmark) L Kjærsfeldt	21	9	18
(Thailand) S Katethong	15	7
(Denmark) L Christophersen	21	21

Quarter-finals
3	(Thailand) P Chochuwong	21	21
(Denmark) L Christophersen	11	15

=== Bottom half ===
==== Section 3 ====
First Round
(India) S Nehwal	16	21	21
(Thailand) P Chaiwan	21	17	23
(France) Qi XF	7	9
6	(South Korea) Sung J-h	21	21
(Malaysia) S Cheah S Y	21	13	16
(Germany) Y Li	15	21	21
(Brazil) F Silva	9	10
4	(Denmark) M Blichfeldt	21	21

Second Round
(Thailand) P Chaiwan	22	21
6	(South Korea) Sung J-h	20	19
(Germany) Y Li	13	21	18
4	(Denmark) M Blichfeldt	21	13	21

Quarter-finals
(Thailand) P Chaiwan	10	7
4	(Denmark) M Blichfeldt	21	21

==== Section 4 ====
First Round
(Israel) K Polikarpova	21	21
PFR	(Wales) J Hart	19	14
(Russia) E Kosetskaya	10	19
5	(Thailand) B Ongbamrungphan	21	21
(Indonesia) R Hartawan	8	11
(United States) I Wang	21	21
(Turkey) N Yiğit	16	19
2	(India) P. V. Sindhu	21	21

Second Round
(Israel) K Polikarpova	4	5
5	(Thailand) B Ongbamrungphan	21	21
(United States) I Wang	13	14
2	(India) P. V. Sindhu	21	21

Quarter-finals
5	(Thailand) B Ongbamrungphan	16	21
2	(India) P. V. Sindhu	21	23

== Men's doubles ==
=== Seeds ===
1. (Malaysia) Aaron Chia / Soh Wooi Yik (semi-finals)
2. (India) Satwiksairaj Rankireddy / Chirag Shetty (semi-finals)
3. (Malaysia) Goh V Shem / Tan Wee Kiong (second round)
4. (England) Marcus Ellis / Chris Langridge (second round)
5. (Malaysia) Ong Yew Sin / Teo Ee Yi (quarter-finals)
6. (Denmark) Kim Astrup / Anders Skaarup Rasmussen (champions)
7. (Russia) Vladimir Ivanov / Ivan Sozonov (second round)
8. (England) Ben Lane / Sean Vendy (second round)

=== Wild card ===
Swiss Badminton awarded a wildcard entry to Yann Orteu / Minh Quang Pham of Switzerland.

=== Finals ===
Semi-finals
1	(Malaysia) Aaron Chia (Malaysia) Soh Wooi Yik	13	21	16
(Germany) Mark Lamsfuß (Germany) Marvin Emil Seidel	21	13	21
6	(Denmark) Kim Astrup (Denmark) Anders Skaarup Rasmussen	21	21
2	(India) Satwiksairaj Rankireddy (India) Chirag Shetty	10	17

Final
(Germany) Mark Lamsfuß (Germany) Marvin Emil Seidel	16	11
6	(Denmark) Kim Astrup (Denmark) Anders Skaarup Rasmussen	21	21

=== Top half ===
==== Section 1 ====
First Round
1	(Malaysia) A Chia (Malaysia) Soh W Y	21	21
(New Zealand) O Leydon-Davis (New Zealand) A Manota	13	15
(Indonesia) M S Fikri (Indonesia) B Maulana	21	19	13
(Denmark) J Bay (Denmark) L Mølhede	10	21	21
8	(England) B Lane (England) S Vendy	21	21
(Denmark) P I Klindt (Denmark) M Thøgersen	18	18
(Indonesia) L R Carnando (Indonesia) D Marthin	21	21
(France) E Adam (France) J Maio	12	10

Second Round
1	(Malaysia) A Chia (Malaysia) Soh W Y	w	/	o
(Denmark) J Bay (Denmark) L Mølhede
8	(England) B Lane (England) S Vendy	19	15
(Indonesia) L R Carnando (Indonesia) D Marthin	21	21

Quarter-finals
1	(Malaysia) A Chia (Malaysia) Soh W Y	21	9	21
(Indonesia) L R Carnando (Indonesia) D Marthin	18	21	16

==== Section 2 ====
First Round
3	(Malaysia) Goh V S (Malaysia) Tan W K	21	21
(Denmark) D Lundgaard (Denmark) M Thyrri	17	11
(Germany) M Lamsfuß (Germany) M E Seidel	21	21
(Germany) J R Jansen (Germany) P Käsbauer	14	13
7	(Russia) V Ivanov (Russia) I Sozonov	21	21
(India) Arjun M.R. (India) D Kapila	16	18
(Thailand) N Phuangphuapet (Thailand) T Viriyangkura	21	21
WC	(Switzerland) Y Orteu (Switzerland) M Q Pham	14	15

Second Round
3	(Malaysia) Goh V S (Malaysia) Tan W K	19	19
(Germany) M Lamsfuß (Germany) M E Seidel	21	21
7	(Russia) V Ivanov (Russia) I Sozonov	16	21	16
(Thailand) N Phuangphuapet (Thailand) T Viriyangkura	21	19	21

Quarter-finals
(Germany) M Lamsfuß (Germany) M E Seidel	21	18	21
(Thailand) N Phuangphuapet (Thailand) T Viriyangkura	14	21	9

=== Bottom half ===
==== Section 3 ====
First Round
(Austria) P Birker (Austria) D Stipsits	12	15
(France) C Popov (France) T J Popov	21	21
(Malaysia) Goh S F (Malaysia) N Izzudin	22	13	13
6	(Denmark) K Astrup (Denmark) A S Rasmussen	20	21	21
(Malaysia) Low H Y (Malaysia) Ng E C	21	16	21
PFR	(Netherlands) R Jille (Netherlands) T van der Lecq	16	21	16
(Nigeria) G Olofua (Nigeria) A J Opeyori	10	12
4	(England) M Ellis (England) C Langridge	21	21

Second Round
(France) C Popov (France) T J Popov	14	15
6	(Denmark) K Astrup (Denmark) A S Rasmussen	21	21
(Malaysia) Low H Y (Malaysia) Ng E C	10	21	21
4	(England) M Ellis (England) C Langridge	21	15	15

Quarter-finals
6	(Denmark) K Astrup (Denmark) A S Rasmussen	21	16	21
(Malaysia) Low H Y (Malaysia) Ng E C	17	21	13

==== Section 4 ====
First Round
(Algeria) K Mammeri (Algeria) Y S Medel	11	17
(Denmark) J Eipe (Denmark) R Kjær	21	21
(United States) P Chew (United States) R Chew	23	12	12
5	(Malaysia) Ong Y S (Malaysia) Teo E Y	21	21	21
(Canada) J Ho-Shue (Canada) N Yakura	21	14	17
(Indonesia) P Kusumawardana (Indonesia) Y Rambitan	15	21	21
(Scotland) C Grimley (Scotland) M Grimley	18	21	16
2	(India) S Rankireddy (India) C Shetty	21	19	21

Second Round
(Denmark) J Eipe (Denmark) R Kjær	18	13
5	(Malaysia) Ong Y S (Malaysia) Teo E Y	21	21
(Indonesia) P Kusumawardana (Indonesia) Y Rambitan	17	22	17
2	(India) S Rankireddy (India) C Shetty	21	20	21

Quarter-finals
5	(Malaysia) Ong Y S (Malaysia) Teo E Y	21	19	12
2	(India) S Rankireddy (India) C Shetty	12	21	21

== Women's doubles ==
=== Seeds ===
1. (Thailand) Jongkolphan Kititharakul / Rawinda Prajongjai (semi-finals)
2. (Malaysia) Chow Mei Kuan / Lee Meng Yean (semi-finals)
3. (Bulgaria) Gabriela Stoeva / Stefani Stoeva (final)
4. (England) Chloe Birch / Lauren Smith (first round)
5. (Denmark) Maiken Fruergaard / Sara Thygesen (quarter-finals)
6. (France) Émilie Lefel / Anne Tran (first round)
7. (Canada) Rachel Honderich / Kristen Tsai (quarter-finals)
8. (Netherlands) Selena Piek / Cheryl Seinen (quarter-finals)

=== Wild card ===
Swiss Badminton awarded a wildcard entry to Jenjira Stadelmann / Caroline Racloz of Switzerland.

=== Finals ===
Semi-finals
1	(Thailand) Jongkolphan Kititharakul (Thailand) Rawinda Prajongjai	16	14
3	(Bulgaria) Gabriela Stoeva (Bulgaria) Stefani Stoeva	21	21
(Malaysia) Pearly Tan Koong Le (Malaysia) Thinaah Muralitharan	10	21	21
2	(Malaysia) Chow Mei Kuan (Malaysia) Lee Meng Yean	21	14	16

Final
3	(Bulgaria) Gabriela Stoeva (Bulgaria) Stefani Stoeva	19	12
(Malaysia) Pearly Tan Koong Le (Malaysia) Thinaah Muralitharan	21	21

=== Top half ===
==== Section 1 ====
First Round
1	(Thailand) J Kititharakul (Thailand) R Prajongjai	w	/	o
(Malaysia) Teoh M X (Malaysia) Yap L
PFR	(Denmark) S Lundgaard (Denmark) C Paredes	17	11
(Thailand) B Aimsaard (Thailand) N Aimsaard	21	21
8	(Netherlands) S Piek (Netherlands) C Seinen	16	21	21
PFR	(Netherlands) A Tirtosentono (Netherlands) I van der Aar	21	19	9
WC	(Switzerland) C Racloz (Switzerland) J Stadelmann	13	17
(Sweden) M Sjöö (Sweden) T Sjöö	21	21

Second Round
1	(Thailand) J Kititharakul (Thailand) R Prajongjai	21	21
(Thailand) B Aimsaard (Thailand) N Aimsaard	14	17
8	(Netherlands) S Piek (Netherlands) C Seinen	21	21
(Sweden) M Sjöö (Sweden) T Sjöö	14	9

Quarter-finals
1	(Thailand) J Kititharakul (Thailand) R Prajongjai	21	21
8	(Netherlands) S Piek (Netherlands) C Seinen	19	13

==== Section 2 ====
First Round
3	(Bulgaria) G Stoeva (Bulgaria) S Stoeva	21	21
PFR	(Denmark) A C Kudsk (Denmark) S S Terp-Nielsen	10	7
(England) A Lado (England) V Williams	12	21	17
(Republic of Ireland) K Frost (Republic of Ireland) M Ryan	21	9	21
5	(Denmark) M Fruergaard (Denmark) S Thygesen	21	20	21
(Denmark) J Finne-Ipsen (Denmark) M Surrow	15	22	12
(Germany) K Ostermeyer (Germany) F Volkmann	21	12	21
(Estonia) K-K Marran (Estonia) H Rüütel	8	21	12

Second Round
3	(Bulgaria) G Stoeva (Bulgaria) S Stoeva	21	21
(Republic of Ireland) K Frost (Republic of Ireland) M Ryan	8	8
5	(Denmark) M Fruergaard (Denmark) S Thygesen	21	21
(Germany) K Ostermeyer (Germany) F Volkmann	16	10

Quarter-finals
3	(Bulgaria) G Stoeva (Bulgaria) S Stoeva	21	21
5	(Denmark) M Fruergaard (Denmark) S Thygesen	18	14

=== Bottom half ===
==== Section 3 ====
First Round
(Malaysia) P Tan K L (Malaysia) Thinaah M	21	21
(Austria) S Au Yeong (Austria) K Hochmeir	7	6
(Russia) A Akchurina (Russia) O Morozova	21	23	21
6	(France) É Lefel (France) A Tran	15	25	15
(India) A Ponnappa (India) N. S Reddy	21	21
(Germany) A Jäger (Germany) S Küspert	5	19
(Denmark) A Magelund (Denmark) F Ravn	21	21
4	(England) C Birch (England) L Smith	15	18

Second Round
(Malaysia) P Tan K L (Malaysia) Thinaah M	21	21
(Russia) A Akchurina (Russia) O Morozova	16	18
(India) A Ponnappa (India) N. S Reddy	11	15
(Denmark) A Magelund (Denmark) F Ravn	21	21

Quarter-finals
(Malaysia) P Tan K L (Malaysia) Thinaah M	21	21
(Denmark) A Magelund (Denmark) F Ravn	19	10

==== Section 4 ====
First Round
(Scotland) J MacPherson (Scotland) C Torrance	13	14
(Denmark) A Bøje (Denmark) M Poulsen	21	21
(Denmark) C Busch (Denmark) A Schulz	21	10	19
7	(Canada) R Honderich (Canada) K Tsai	17	21	21
(Sweden) J Magnusson (Sweden) C Nistad	21	18
(Germany) L Efler (Germany) I Herttrich	23	21
(England) J Hopton (England) J Moore	18	13
2	(Malaysia) Chow M K (Malaysia) Lee M Y	21	21

Second Round
(Denmark) A Bøje (Denmark) M Poulsen
7	(Canada) R Honderich (Canada) K Tsai	w	/	o
(Germany) L Efler (Germany) I Herttrich	18	17
2	(Malaysia) Chow M K (Malaysia) Lee M Y	21	21

Quarter-finals
7	(Canada) R Honderich (Canada) K Tsai	20	16
2	(Malaysia) Chow M K (Malaysia) Lee M Y	22	21

== Mixed doubles ==
=== Seeds ===
1. (Malaysia) Chan Peng Soon / Goh Liu Ying (quarter-finals)
2. (Indonesia) Hafiz Faizal / Gloria Emanuelle Widjaja (first round)
3. (England) Marcus Ellis / Lauren Smith (semi-finals)
4. (Malaysia) Goh Soon Huat / Shevon Jemie Lai (quarter-finals)
5. (Malaysia) Tan Kian Meng / Lai Pei Jing (semi-finals)
6. (France) Thom Gicquel / Delphine Delrue (champions)
7. (Germany) Mark Lamsfuß / Isabel Herttrich (quarter-finals)
8. (Netherlands) Robin Tabeling / Selena Piek (first round)

=== Wild card ===
Swiss Badminton awarded a wildcard entry to Yann Orteu / Aline Müller of Switzerland.

=== Finals ===
Semi-finals
(Denmark) Mathias Christiansen (Denmark) Alexandra Bøje	21	23
3	(England) Marcus Ellis (England) Lauren Smith	16	21
6	(France) Thom Gicquel (France) Delphine Delrue	21	21
5	(Malaysia) Tan Kian Meng (Malaysia) Lai Pei Jing	19	10

Final
(Denmark) Mathias Christiansen (Denmark) Alexandra Bøje	19	19
6	(France) Thom Gicquel (France) Delphine Delrue	21	21

=== Top half ===
==== Section 1 ====
First Round
1	(Malaysia) Chan P S (Malaysia) Goh L Y	21	15	21
(Thailand) N Phuangphuapet (Thailand) B Aimsaard	15	21	19
(France) R Labar (France) A Tran	21	21
(Malaysia) Hoo P R (Malaysia) Cheah Y S	19	17
8	(Netherlands) R Tabeling (Netherlands) S Piek	20	23	16
(Russia) R Alimov (Russia) A Davletova	22	21	21
(Denmark) M Christiansen (Denmark) A Bøje	21	21
(New Zealand) O Leydon-Ravis (New Zealand) A Pak	18	9

Second Round
1	(Malaysia) Chan P S (Malaysia) Goh L Y	21	21
(France) R Labar (France) A Tran	12	16
(Russia) R Alimov (Russia) A Davletova	14	13
(Denmark) M Christiansen (Denmark) A Bøje	21	21

Quarter-finals
1	(Malaysia) Chan P S (Malaysia) Goh L Y	21	19	15
(Denmark) M Christiansen (Denmark) A Bøje	14	21	21

==== Section 2 ====
First Round
3	(England) M Ellis (England) L Smith	21	21
(India) P Chopra (India) N. S Reddy	18	15
(Denmark) J Bay (Denmark) S Lundgaard	21	21
(England) M Flynn (England) J Pugh	14	10
7	(Germany) M Lamsfuß (Germany) I Herttrich	20	21	21
(Scotland) A Hall (Scotland) J MacPherson	22	19	16
(Republic of Ireland) S Magee (Republic of Ireland) C Magee	21	21
(England) C Hemming (England) V Williams	12	16

Second Round
3	(England) M Ellis (England) L Smith	21	21
(Denmark) J Bay (Denmark) S Lundgaard	7	12
7	(Germany) M Lamsfuß (Germany) I Herttrich	21	21
(Republic of Ireland) S Magee (Republic of Ireland) C Magee	17	8

Quarter-finals
3	(England) M Ellis (England) L Smith	14	21	21
7	(Germany) M Lamsfuß (Germany) I Herttrich	21	14	10

=== Bottom half ===
==== Section 3 ====
First Round
(Denmark) M Mikkelsen (Denmark) R Søby Hansen	21	21
(Canada) J Hurlburt-Yu (Canada) J Wu	18	9
(Malaysia) Chen T J (Malaysia) Peck Y W	12	17
6	(France) T Gicquel (France) D Delrue	21	21
PFR	(Denmark) R Espersen (Denmark) C Busch	19	21	21
(Denmark) N Nøhr (Denmark) A Magelund	21	18	17
PFR	(France) E Adam (France) M Lambert	18	14
4	(Malaysia) Goh S H (Malaysia) S J Lai	21	21

Second Round
(Denmark) M Mikkelsen (Denmark) R Søby Hansen	15	16
6	(France) T Gicquel (France) D Delrue	21	21
PFR	(Denmark) R Espersen (Denmark) C Busch	10	15
4	(Malaysia) Goh S H (Malaysia) S J Lai	21	21

Quarter-finals
6	(France) T Gicquel (France) D Delrue	14	21	21
4	(Malaysia) Goh S H (Malaysia) S J Lai	21	14	19

==== Section 4 ====
First Round
(Germany) J R Jansen (Germany) K Ostermeyer	19	21	21
WC	(Switzerland) Y Orteu (Switzerland) A Müller	21	12	11
(Indonesia) A Maulana (Indonesia) M C Bandaso	13	12
5	(Malaysia) Tan K M (Malaysia) Lai P J	21	21
(Indonesia) R Rivaldy (Indonesia) P H Mentari	21	21
PFR	(Netherlands) T van der Lecq (Netherlands) D Jille	13	15
(India) S Rankireddy (India) A Ponnappa	21	21
2	(Indonesia) H Faizal (Indonesia) G E Widjaja	18	10

Second Round
(Germany) J R Jansen (Germany) K Ostermeyer	14	17
5	(Malaysia) Tan K M (Malaysia) Lai P J	21	21
(Indonesia) R Rivaldy (Indonesia) P H Mentari	18	16
(India) S Rankireddy (India) A Ponnappa	21	21

Quarter-finals
5	(Malaysia) Tan K M (Malaysia) Lai P J	21	16	21
(India) S Rankireddy (India) A Ponnappa	17	21	18

Preceded by 2020 BWF World Tour Finals	BWF World Tour; 2021 BWF season	Succeeded by 2021 All England Open
