= Pearly Tan =

Malaysian badminton player (born 2000)

Pearly Tan 陈康乐
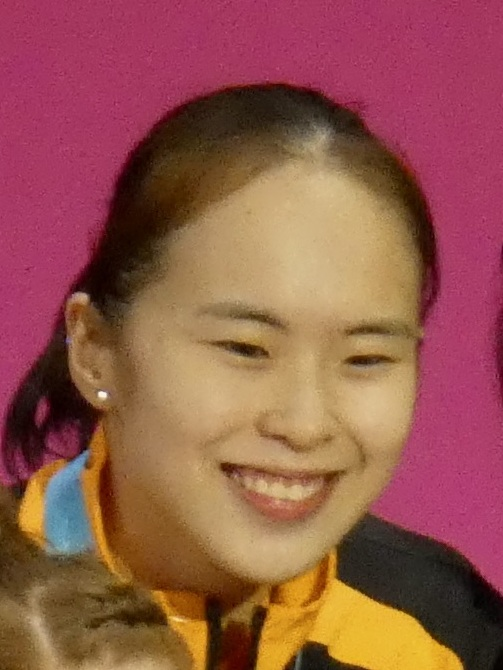
- Tan at the 2022 Commonwealth Games medal ceremony

Personal information
- Born: Pearly Tan Koong Le; 14 March 2000 (age 26) Alor Setar, Kedah, Malaysia
- Years active: 2015-present
- Height: 1.64 m (5 ft 5 in)

Sport
- Country: Malaysia
- Sport: Badminton
- Handedness: Right
- Coached by: Rosman Razak

Women's doubles
- Highest ranking: 2 (WD with Thinaah Muralitharan, 29 July 2025); 74 (XD with Man Wei Chong, 17 March 2020)
- Current ranking: 4 (WD with Thinaah Muralitharan, 10 November 2026)
- BWF profile
Medal record
Women's badminton
Representing Malaysia
World Championships
Silver medal – second place	2025 Paris	Women's doubles
Sudirman Cup
Bronze medal – third place	2021 Vantaa	Mixed team
Bronze medal – third place	2023 Suzhou	Mixed team
Commonwealth Games
Gold medal – first place	2022 Birmingham	Women's doubles
Gold medal – first place	2022 Birmingham	Mixed team
Asian Games
Bronze medal – third place	2026 Aichi–Nagoya	Women's doubles
Asia Team Championships
Bronze medal – third place	2020 Manila	Women's team
Bronze medal – third place	2022 Selangor	Women's team
SEA Games
Gold medal – first place	2025 Thailand	Women's doubles
Bronze medal – third place	2025 Thailand	Women's team
World Junior Championships
Silver medal – second place	2016 Bilbao	Mixed team
Silver medal – second place	2017 Yogyakarta	Mixed team
Silver medal – second place	2018 Markham	Girls' doubles
Asian Junior Championships
Silver medal – second place	2018 Jakarta	Girls' doubles
Bronze medal – third place	2017 Jakarta	Mixed team
Bronze medal – third place	2018 Jakarta	Mixed team

Pearly Tan Koong Le (Note: Chinese: 陳康樂; pinyin: Chén Kānglè; Pe̍h-ōe-jī: Tân Khong-lo̍k.; In this Chinese name, the family name is Tan. In accordance with custom, the Western-style name is Pearly Tan and the Chinese-style name is Tan Koong Le.) KMN ASK (born 14 March 2000) is a Malaysian badminton player. She and her partner Thinaah Muralitharan won the women's doubles silver medals at the 2025 World Championships and reached the women's doubles semi-finals at the 2024 Summer Olympics. They also won gold medals in both the women's doubles and the mixed team events at the 2022 Commonwealth Games as well as in the women's doubles event at the 2025 SEA Games. They became the first ever Malaysian World Championship medalists and Olympic semi-finalists in the women's doubles event. Their results at the World Championships and the Olympic Games made them the most successful Malaysian badminton women's doubles pair in the history.

== Career ==
=== 2018 ===
In July, Tan and Toh Ee Wei became silver medalists in the girls' doubles events at the Badminton Asia Junior Championships.

Following a win at the Malaysia International Junior Open, Tan and Toh continued their great form at the World Junior Championships and clinched silver. Tan also won all of her matches in the Mixed Team event both with Toh and as a scratch pairing with Goh Jin Wei.

=== 2019 ===
After brief partnerships with Teoh Mei Xing and Lim Chiew Sin, Tan went on to win her maiden senior title at the 2019 Malaysia International Series with Thinaah Muralitharan.

=== 2021 ===
Tan and Muralitharan clinched their first BWF World Tour title at the Swiss Open, defeating teammates and second seeds Chow Mei Kuan and Lee Meng Yean in the semi-finals, and third seeds Gabriela Stoeva and Stefani Stoeva in the finals as an unseeded pair.

=== 2022 ===
In August, Tan and Muralitharan became gold medalists in the women's doubles and mixed team event at the 2022 Commonwealth Games.

In October, Tan and Muralitharan claimed the French Open title, becoming the first ever Malaysian women's doubles pair to achieve this feat.

=== 2023 ===
In April, Tan set a new world record for the fastest women's badminton smash at 438 kilometers per hour at the Yonex Tokyo Factory. She is the first badminton player to hold that world record.

In May, Tan and Muralitharan won all of their games at the Sudirman Cup and managed a second-place finish at the Malaysia Masters, losing to Baek Ha-na and Lee So-hee in the finals.

At the World Championships, Tan and Muralitharan defeated fourth seeds and two-time former champions Mayu Matsumoto and Wakana Nagahara in the third round, but fell to sixth seeds Zhang Shuxian and Zheng Yu in the quarter finals in a tightly contested three game match.

In September, they finished second at the Hong Kong Open, losing to Apriyani Rahayu and Siti Fadia Silva Ramadhanti in the finals.

=== 2024 ===
Tan and Muralitharan became the first ever Malaysian women's doubles pair to advance to the semi-finals of an Olympic Games at the 2024 Paris Olympics. Ranked 13th in the world at the time, they were drawn into Group A alongside Chen Qingchen and Jia Yifan from China, Mayu Matsumoto and Wakana Nagahara from Japan, and Apriyani Rahayu and Siti Fadia Silva Ramadhanti from Indonesia, ranked 1st, 6th, and 9th in the world respectively. Having successfully advanced from the group stage with a 2–1 record, they defeated then ranked 7th in the world Kim So-yeong and Kong Hee-yong from Korea in the quarter-finals in straight sets, before falling to Chen and Jia in the semi-finals and Japan's Nami Matsuyama and Chiharu Shida in the bronze medal match.

In September, they finished second at the Korea Open, losing to Jeong Na-eun and Kim Hye-jeong in the finals. They won their first Super 500 level title at the Hong Kong Open, defeating Liu Shengshu and Tan Ning in the finals in straight sets.

In October, they finished second at the Arctic Open, losing to Liu and Tan in the finals.

=== 2025 ===
In 2025, Tan competed in the SEA Games in Thailand. She managed to contribute a gold medal in the women's doubles, and a bronze in the team event.

== Personal life ==
Tan was born in Alor Setar, Kedah to Tan Chai Ling and badminton coach Tan Seng Hoe. Her father runs the Alor Setar Racquet Club (ASRC), which is also the childhood club of national shuttlers Lee Zii Jia and Jacky Kok.

== Awards and recognition ==
=== Honours ===
==== Honours of Malaysia ====
- Malaysia
  - Officer of the Order of the Defender of the Realm (KMN) (2026)
- Kedah
  - Companion of the Ahli Cemerlang Semangat Jerai Kedah (ASK) (2022).

=== Awards ===
Year	Award	Category	Result	Ref
2022	National Sports Awards	National women's team (with Thinaah Muralitharan)	Won	

== Achievements ==
=== World Championships ===
Women's doubles
Year	Venue	Partner	Opponent	Score	Result	Ref.
2025	Adidas Arena; Paris, France	(Malaysia) Thinaah Muralitharan	(China) Liu Shengshu (China) Tan Ning	14–21, 22–20, 17–21	Silver	

=== Commonwealth Games ===
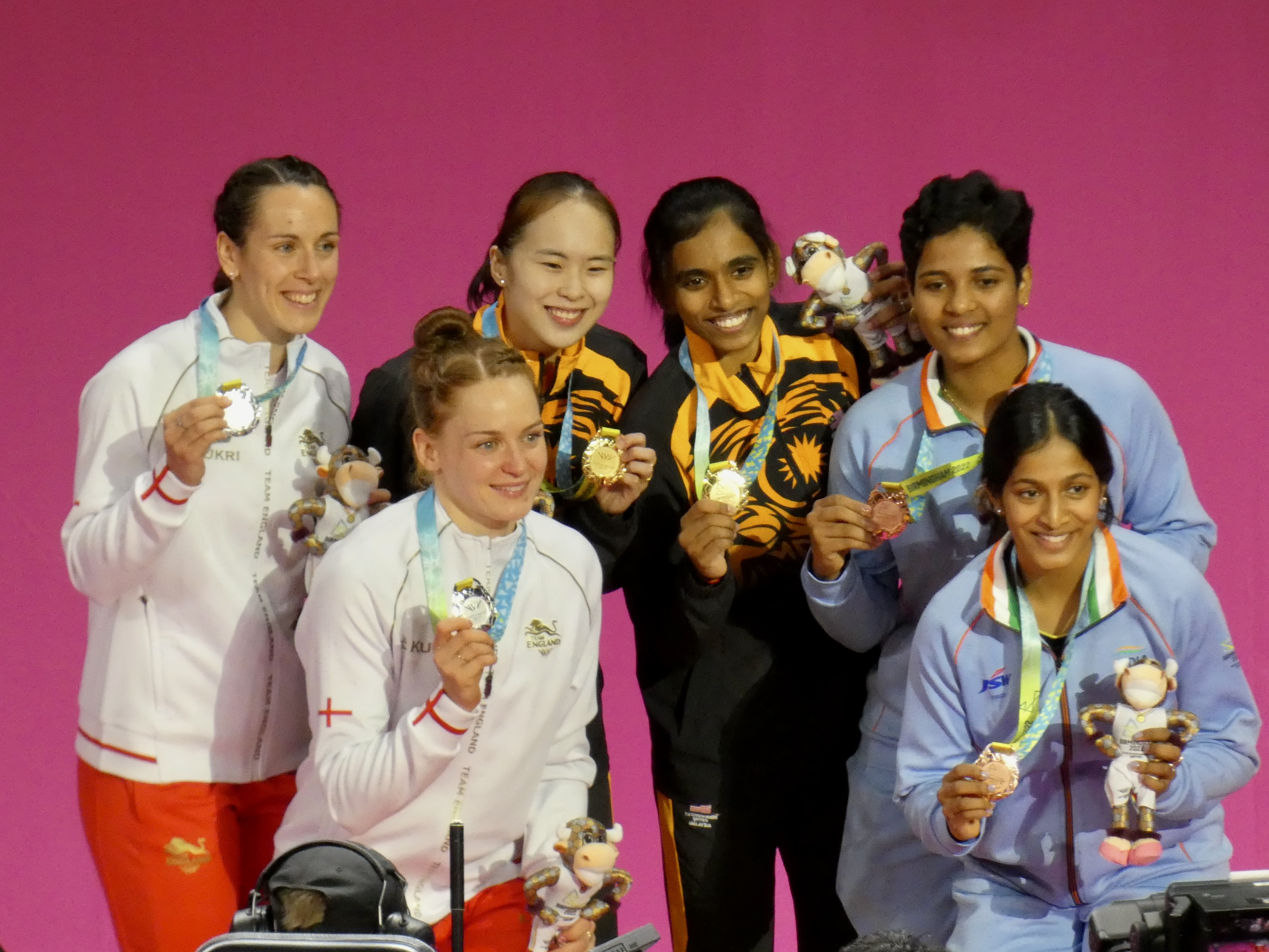
The six medallists in the women's badminton doubles at the 2022 Commonwealth Games in Birmingham. Left to right: Chloe Birch and Lauren Smith (England), Pearly Tan and Thinaah Muralitharan (Malaysia), Treesa Jolly and Gayatri Gopichand (India).

Women's doubles
Year	Venue	Partner	Opponent	Score	Result	Ref.
2022	National Exhibition Centre; Birmingham, England	(Malaysia) Thinaah Muralitharan	(England) Chloe Birch (England) Lauren Smith	21–5, 21–8	Gold	

=== Asian Games ===
Women's doubles
Year	Venue	Partner	Opponent	Score	Result	Ref.
2026	Ichinomiya City Municipal Gymnasium, Ichinomiya, Japan	(Malaysia) Thinaah Muralitharan	(China) Liu Shengshu (China) Tan Ning	21–16, 20–22, 12–21	Bronze	

=== SEA Games ===
Women's doubles
Year	Venue	Partner	Opponent	Score	Result	Ref.
2025	Gymnasium 4, Thammasat University Rangsit Campus; Pathum Thani, Thailand	(Malaysia) Thinaah Muralitharan	(Indonesia) Febriana Dwipuji Kusuma (Indonesia) Meilysa Trias Puspita Sari	21–16, 19–21, 21–17	Gold	

=== World Junior Championships ===
Girls' doubles
Year	Venue	Partner	Opponent	Score	Result	Ref.
2018	Markham Pan Am Centre; Markham, Canada	(Malaysia) Toh Ee Wei	(China) Liu Xuanxuan (China) Xia Yuting	16–21, 16–21	Silver	

=== Asian Junior Championships ===
Girls' doubles
Year	Venue	Partner	Opponent	Score	Result	Ref.
2018	Jaya Raya Sports Hall Training Center; Jakarta, Indonesia	(Malaysia) Toh Ee Wei	(Indonesia) Febriana Dwipuji Kusuma (Indonesia) Ribka Sugiarto	12–21, 16–21	Silver	

=== BWF World Tour (9 titles, 9 runners-up) ===
The BWF World Tour, which was announced on 19 March 2017 and implemented in 2018, is a series of elite badminton tournaments sanctioned by the Badminton World Federation (BWF). The BWF World Tours are divided into levels of World Tour Finals, Super 1000, Super 750, Super 500, Super 300, and the BWF Tour Super 100.

Women's doubles
Year	Tournament	Level	Partner	Opponent	Score	Result	Ref.
2021	Swiss Open	Super 300	(Malaysia) Thinaah Muralitharan	(Bulgaria) Gabriela Stoeva (Bulgaria) Stefani Stoeva	21–19, 21–12	(gold) Winner	
2022	French Open	Super 750	(Malaysia) Thinaah Muralitharan	(Japan) Mayu Matsumoto (Japan) Wakana Nagahara	21–19, 18–21, 21–15	(gold) Winner	
2023	Malaysia Masters	Super 500	(Malaysia) Thinaah Muralitharan	(South Korea) Baek Ha-na (South Korea) Lee So-hee	20–22, 21–8, 17–21	(silver) Runner-up	
2023	Hong Kong Open	Super 500	(Malaysia) Thinaah Muralitharan	(Indonesia) Apriyani Rahayu (Indonesia) Siti Fadia Silva Ramadhanti	21–14, 22–24, 9–21	(silver) Runner-up	
2024	Korea Open	Super 500	(Malaysia) Thinaah Muralitharan	(South Korea) Jeong Na-eun (South Korea) Kim Hye-jeong	12–21, 11–21	(silver) Runner-up	
2024	Hong Kong Open	Super 500	(Malaysia) Thinaah Muralitharan	(China) Liu Shengshu (China) Tan Ning	21–14, 21–14	(gold) Winner	
2024	Arctic Open	Super 500	(Malaysia) Thinaah Muralitharan	(China) Liu Shengshu (China) Tan Ning	12–21, 17–21	(silver) Runner-up	
2025	Indonesia Masters	Super 500	(Malaysia) Thinaah Muralitharan	(South Korea) Kim Hye-jeong (South Korea) Kong Hee-yong	12–21, 21–17, 18–21	(silver) Runner-up	
2025	Thailand Open	Super 500	(Malaysia) Thinaah Muralitharan	(South Korea) Jeong Na-eun (South Korea) Lee Yeon-woo	21–16, 21–17	(gold) Winner	
2025	Indonesia Open	Super 1000	(Malaysia) Thinaah Muralitharan	(China) Liu Shengshu (China) Tan Ning	25–23, 12–21, 19–21	(silver) Runner-up	
2025	Japan Open	Super 750	(Malaysia) Thinaah Muralitharan	(China) Liu Shengshu (China) Tan Ning	15–21, 14–21	(silver) Runner-up	
2025	Arctic Open	Super 500	(Malaysia) Thinaah Muralitharan	(Japan) Rin Iwanaga (Japan) Kie Nakanishi	21–7, 21–9	(gold) Winner	
2025	Japan Masters	Super 500	(Malaysia) Thinaah Muralitharan	(Japan) Rin Iwanaga (Japan) Kie Nakanishi	22–20, 21–19	(gold) Winner	
2026	Indonesia Masters	Super 500	(Malaysia) Thinaah Muralitharan	(Japan) Arisa Igarashi (Japan) Miyu Takahashi	Walkover	(gold) Winner	
2026	Taipei Open	Super 300	(Malaysia) Thinaah Muralitharan	(Japan) Sumire Nakade (Japan) Miyu Takahashi	16–21, 18–21	(silver) Runner-up	
2026	Denmark Open	Super 750	(Malaysia) Thinaah Muralitharan	(Japan) Hinata Suzuki (Japan) Nao Yamakita	21–18, 21–11	(gold) Winner	
2026	French Open	Super 750	(Malaysia) Thinaah Muralitharan	(Japan) Yuki Fukushima (Japan) Mayu Matsumoto	21–10, 17–21, 16–21	(silver) Runner-up	
2026	Hong Kong Open	Super 500	(Malaysia) Thinaah Muralitharan	(Japan) Sumire Nakade (Japan) Miyu Takahashi	22–20, 21–16	(gold) Winner	

=== BWF International Challenge/Series (3 titles, 3 runners-up) ===
Women's doubles
Year	Tournament	Partner	Opponent	Score	Result
2019	Malaysia International	(Malaysia) Thinaah Muralitharan	(Indonesia) Febriana Dwipuji Kusuma (Indonesia) Ribka Sugiarto	21–16, 11–21, 21–18	(gold) Winner
2019	Sydney International	(Malaysia) Thinaah Muralitharan	(Chinese Taipei) Cheng Yu-chieh (Chinese Taipei) Tseng Yu-chi	17–21, 21–17, 13–21	(silver) Runner-up
2019	India International	(Malaysia) Thinaah Muralitharan	(Malaysia) Teoh Mei Xing (Malaysia) Yap Ling	21–18, 21–14	(gold) Winner
2019	Bangladesh International	(Malaysia) Thinaah Muralitharan	(India) K. Maneesha (India) Rutaparna Panda	22–20, 21–19	(gold) Winner

Mixed doubles
Year	Tournament	Partner	Opponent	Score	Result
2019	India International	(Malaysia) Chia Wei Jie	(Malaysia) Hoo Pang Ron (Malaysia) Cheah Yee See	15–21, 15–21	(silver) Runner-up
2019	Malaysia International	(Malaysia) Man Wei Chong	(China) Dong Weijie (China) Chen Xiaofei	16–21, 19–21	(silver) Runner-up

BWF International Challenge tournament
BWF International Series tournament
