= Badminton at the 2025 SEA Games – Women's team =

Badminton – Women's team at the 2025 SEA Games
- Venue: Thammasat University Rangsit Campus
- Dates: 7–10 December 2025
- Nations: 7

Medalists
gold medal	Thailand (THA)
silver medal	Indonesia (INA)
bronze medal	Singapore (SGP)
bronze medal	Malaysia (MAS)

The women's team badminton tournament at the 2025 SEA Games will be held from 7 to 10 December 2025 at the Thammasat University Rangsit Campus, Pathum Thani, Thailand.

== Schedule ==
All times are Indochina Time (UTC+07:00)

Date	Time	Event
Sunday, 7 December	10:00	Quarterfinals
Monday, 8 December	10:00	Semifinals
Wednesday, 10 December	10:00	Gold medal match

== Bracket ==
Quarterfinals
3/4	Singapore (SGP)	3
Philippines (PHI)	0
Vietnam (VIE)	1
3/4	Malaysia (MAS)	3
Myanmar (MYA)	0
2	Indonesia (INA)	3

Semifinals
1	Thailand (THA)	3
3/4	Singapore (SGP)	0
3/4	Malaysia (MAS)	2
2	Indonesia (INA)	3

Final
1	Thailand (THA)	3
2	Indonesia (INA)	1

== Quarterfinals ==
=== Singapore vs Philippines ===
Singapore
3
Thammasat University Rangsit Campus
7 December 2025 10:00 UTC+7

Philippines
0

			1	2	3
1	(Singapore) (Philippines)	Insyirah Khan; Mikhaela de Guzman	21; 15	21; 18
2	(Singapore) (Philippines)	Megan Lee; Ysabel Amora	19; 21	24; 22	21; 16
3	(Singapore) (Philippines)	Jaslyn Hooi; Christel Fuentespina	21; 10	21; 14
4	(Singapore) (Philippines)	Insyirah Khan / Megan Lee; Andrea Princess Hernandez / Mary Untal				not played
5	(Singapore) (Philippines)	Jaslyn Hooi / Jin Yujia; Eleanor Inlayo / Jeya Pinlac				not played

=== Vietnam vs Malaysia ===
Vietnam
1
Thammasat University Rangsit Campus
7 December 2025 10:00 UTC+7

Malaysia
3

			1	2	3
1	(Vietnam) (Malaysia)	Nguyễn Thùy Linh; Letshanaa Karupathevan	15; 21	21; 10	23; 21
2	(Vietnam) (Malaysia)	Vũ Thị Trang; Wong Ling Ching	14; 21	22; 20	14; 21
3	(Vietnam) (Malaysia)	Phạm Thị Khánh / Phạm Thị Diệu Ly; Pearly Tan / Thinaah Muralitharan	12; 21	8; 21
4	(Vietnam) (Malaysia)	Bùi Bích Phương; Siti Zulaikha Muhammad Azmi	19; 21	19; 21
5	(Vietnam) (Malaysia)	Nguyễn Thùy Linh / Vũ Thị Trang; Go Pei Kee / Teoh Mei Xing				not played

=== Myanmar vs Indonesia ===
Myanmar
0
Thammasat University Rangsit Campus
7 December 2025 10:00 UTC+7

Indonesia
3

			1	2	3
1	(Myanmar) (Indonesia)	Thet Htar Thuzar; Putri Kusuma Wardani	21; 17	20; 22	13; 21
2	(Myanmar) (Indonesia)	Eaint Chit Phoo; Gregoria Mariska Tunjung	9; 21	7; 21
3	(Myanmar) (Indonesia)	Su Latt / Khaing Thin Zar; Rachel Allessya Rose / Febi Setianingrum	10; 21	6; 21
4	(Myanmar) (Indonesia)	Lin Lin Htet; Mutiara Ayu Puspitasari				not played
5	(Myanmar) (Indonesia)	Ngar Myar / Eaint Chit Phoo; Febriana Dwipuji Kusuma / Mutiara Ayu Puspitasari				not played

== Semifinals ==
=== Thailand vs Singapore ===
Thailand
3
Thammasat University Rangsit Campus
8 December 2025 10:00 UTC+7

Singapore
0

			1	2	3
1	(Thailand) (Singapore)	Pornpawee Chochuwong; Insyirah Khan	21; 14	21; 15
2	(Thailand) (Singapore)	Benyapa Aimsaard / Supissara Paewsampran; Jin Yujia / Li Zhengyan	21; 6	21; 10
3	(Thailand) (Singapore)	Ratchanok Intanon; Megan Lee	21; 8	21; 10
4	(Thailand) (Singapore)	Ornnicha Jongsathapornparn / Jhenicha Sudjaipraparat; Li Zhenghong / Andrea Jacqui Tay				not played
5	(Thailand) (Singapore)	Supanida Katethong; Jaslyn Hooi				not played

=== Malaysia vs Indonesia ===
Malaysia
2
Thammasat University Rangsit Campus
8 December 2025 10:00 UTC+7

Indonesia
3

			1	2	3
1	(Malaysia) (Indonesia)	Letshanaa Karupathevan; Putri Kusuma Wardani	9; 21	10; 21
2	(Malaysia) (Indonesia)	Pearly Tan / Thinaah Muralitharan; Rachel Allessya Rose / Febi Setianingrum	21; 14	17; 21	21; 16
3	(Malaysia) (Indonesia)	Wong Ling Ching; Gregoria Mariska Tunjung	22; 20	15; 21	21; 16
4	(Malaysia) (Indonesia)	Go Pei Kee / Toh Ee Wei; Febriana Dwipuji Kusuma / Meilysa Trias Puspitasari	10; 21	9; 21
5	(Malaysia) (Indonesia)	Siti Zulaikha Muhammad Azmi; Mutiara Ayu Puspitasari	18; 21	16; 21

== Final ==
=== Thailand vs Indonesia ===
Thailand
3
Thammasat University Rangsit Campus
10 December 2025 10:00 UTC+7

Indonesia
1

			1	2	3
1	(Thailand) (Indonesia)	Pornpawee Chochuwong; Putri Kusuma Wardani	8; 21	21; 13	16; 21
2	(Thailand) (Indonesia)	Benyapa Aimsaard / Supissara Paewsampran; Rachel Allessya Rose / Febi Setianingrum	21; 18	11; 21	21; 18
3	(Thailand) (Indonesia)	Ratchanok Intanon; Gregoria Mariska Tunjung	21; 7	21; 15
4	(Thailand) (Indonesia)	Ornnicha Jongsathapornparn / Jhenicha Sudjaipraparat; Febriana Dwipuji Kusuma / Meilysa Trias Puspitasari	21; 19	21; 18
5	(Thailand) (Indonesia)	Supanida Katethong; Ni Kadek Dhinda Amartya Pratiwi				not played

== See also ==
- Individual event tournament
- Men's team tournament
