= Tan Ning (badminton) =

Chinese badminton player (born 2003)

Tan Ning 谭宁
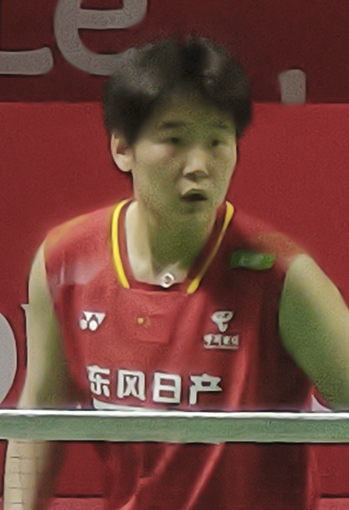
- Tan at the 2026 Indonesia Open

Personal information
- Born: 3 April 2003 (age 23) Changsha, Hunan, China
- Height: 1.68 m (5 ft 6 in)

Sport
- Country: China
- Sport: Badminton
- Handedness: Right

Women's doubles
- Highest ranking: 1 (with Liu Shengshu, 22 October 2024)
- Current ranking: 1 (with Liu Shengshu, 27 October 2026)
- BWF profile
Medal record
Women's badminton
Representing China
Olympic Games
Silver medal – second place	2024 Paris	Women's doubles
World Championships
Gold medal – first place	2025 Paris	Women's doubles
Silver medal – second place	2026 New Dehli	Women's doubles
Sudirman Cup
Gold medal – first place	2023 Suzhou	Mixed team
Gold medal – first place	2025 Xiamen	Mixed team
Uber Cup
Gold medal – first place	2024 Chengdu	Women's team
Silver medal – second place	2026 Horsens	Women's team
Asian Games
Gold medal – first place	2026 Aichi–Nagoya	Women's team
Silver medal – second place	2026 Aichi–Nagoya	Women's doubles
Asian Championships
Gold medal – first place	2025 Ningbo	Women's doubles
Silver medal – second place	2026 Ningbo	Women's doubles
Bronze medal – third place	2024 Ningbo	Women's doubles
Asia Mixed Team Championships
Gold medal – first place	2023 Dubai	Mixed team
Asian Junior Championships
Bronze medal – third place	2019 Suzhou	Girls' singles

Tan Ning (simplified Chinese: 谭宁; traditional Chinese: 譚寧; pinyin: Tán Níng; born 3 April 2003) is a Chinese badminton player. She won the women's doubles silver medal at the 2024 Olympic Games and a bronze medal at the 2024 Asian Championships. She also helped the national team win the 2023 Asia Mixed Team Championships and the 2024 Uber Cup. Tan reached a career high of world number 1 in the BWF World Rankings on 22 October 2024 with her partner Liu Shengshu.

== Career ==
In her junior days, Tan played singles. She won the bronze medal in girls' singles at the 2019 Asian Junior Championships.

In 2022, she partnered with World Junior Championship gold medalist Liu Shengshu and won against their compatriots Li Yijing and Luo Xumin at the Malaysia International in November.

Her partnership with Liu continued to excel in 2023. The pair helped deliver the final point for the Chinese team when they competed against South Korea at the 2023 Badminton Asia Mixed Team Championships. In April, Tan and Liu won the 2023 Spain Masters after defeating their teammates Chen Fanghui and Du Yue with a score of 21–8, 16–21, 21–18.

In 2024, in her debut at the Olympics, Tan and her partner Liu advanced to the women's doubles final. They lost the gold medal match to their senior compatriot Chen Qingchen and Jia Yifan.

In 2025, Tan and Liu emerged victory at the Asian Championships.

== Achievements ==
=== Olympic Games ===
Women's doubles
Year	Venue	Partner	Opponent	Score	Result	Ref.
2024	Porte de La Chapelle Arena, Paris, France	(China) Liu Shengshu	(China) Chen Qingchen (China) Jia Yifan	20–22, 15–21	Silver	

=== World Championships ===
Women's doubles
Year	Venue	Partner	Opponent	Score	Result	Ref.
2025	Adidas Arena, Paris, France	(China) Liu Shengshu	(Malaysia) Pearly Tan (Malaysia) Thinaah Muralitharan	21–14, 20–22, 21–17	Gold	
2026	Indira Gandhi Arena, New Delhi, India	(China) Liu Shengshu	(South Korea) Baek Ha-na (South Korea) Lee So-hee	15–21, 15–21	Silver	

=== Asian Games ===
Women's doubles
Year	Venue	Partner	Opponent	Score	Result	Ref.
2026	Ichinomiya City Municipal Gymnasium, Ichinomiya, Japan	(China) Liu Shengshu	(South Korea) Baek Ha-na (South Korea) Lee So-hee	28–26, 18–21, 18–21	Silver	

=== Asian Championships ===
Women's doubles
Year	Venue	Partner	Opponent	Score	Result	Ref.
2024	Ningbo Olympic Sports Center Gymnasium, Ningbo, China	(China) Liu Shengshu	(South Korea) Baek Ha-na (South Korea) Lee So-hee	21–12, 18–21, 12–21	Bronze	
2025	Ningbo Olympic Sports Center Gymnasium, Ningbo, China	(China) Liu Shengshu	(Japan) Nami Matsuyama (Japan) Chiharu Shida	21–15, 21–19	Gold	
2026	Ningbo Olympic Sports Center Gymnasium, Ningbo, China	(China) Liu Shengshu	(China) Li Yijing (China) Luo Xumin	5–8 retired	Silver	

=== Asian Junior Championships ===
Girls' singles
Year	Venue	Opponent	Score	Result	Ref.
2019	Suzhou Olympic Sports Centre, Suzhou, China	(China) Han Qianxi	21–11, 18–21, 10–21	Bronze	

=== BWF World Tour (18 titles, 8 runners-up) ===
The BWF World Tour, which was announced on 19 March 2017 and implemented in 2018, is a series of elite badminton tournaments sanctioned by the Badminton World Federation (BWF). The BWF World Tours are divided into levels of World Tour Finals, Super 1000, Super 750, Super 500, Super 300, and the BWF Tour Super 100.

Women’s doubles
Year	Tournament	Level	Partner	Opponent	Score	Result	Ref.
2023	Spain Masters	Super 300	(China) Liu Shengshu	(China) Chen Fanghui (China) Du Yue	21–8, 16–21, 21–18	(gold) Winner	
2023	Orléans Masters	Super 300	(China) Liu Shengshu	(Japan) Rena Miyaura (Japan) Ayako Sakuramoto	19–21, 21–16, 12–21	(silver) Runner-up	
2023	U.S. Open	Super 300	(China) Liu Shengshu	(Denmark) Maiken Fruergaard (Denmark) Sara Thygesen	21–19, 21–19	(gold) Winner	
2023	Australian Open	Super 500	(China) Liu Shengshu	(South Korea) Kim So-yeong (South Korea) Kong Hee-yong	18–21, 16–21	(silver) Runner-up	
2023	Arctic Open	Super 500	(China) Liu Shengshu	(Thailand) Jongkolphan Kititharakul (Thailand) Rawinda Prajongjai	21–13, 24–22	(gold) Winner	
2023	French Open	Super 750	(China) Liu Shengshu	(Thailand) Jongkolphan Kititharakul (Thailand) Rawinda Prajongjai	26–24, 21–19	(gold) Winner	
2023	Japan Masters	Super 500	(China) Liu Shengshu	(China) Zhang Shuxian (China) Zheng Yu	21–12, 12–21, 17–21	(silver) Runner-up	
2024	Malaysia Open	Super 1000	(China) Liu Shengshu	(China) Zhang Shuxian (China) Zheng Yu	21–18, 21–18	(gold) Winner	
2024	Indonesia Masters	Super 500	(China) Liu Shengshu	(China) Zhang Shuxian (China) Zheng Yu	10–21, 21–19, 22–20	(gold) Winner	
2024	Japan Open	Super 750	(China) Liu Shengshu	(South Korea) Baek Ha-na (South Korea) Lee So-hee	21–18, 22–20	(gold) Winner	
2024	Hong Kong Open	Super 500	(China) Liu Shengshu	(Malaysia) Pearly Tan (Malaysia) Thinaah Muralitharan	14–21, 14–21	(silver) Runner-up	
2024	Arctic Open	Super 500	(China) Liu Shengshu	(Malaysia) Pearly Tan (Malaysia) Thinaah Muralitharan	21–12, 21–17	(gold) Winner	
2024	Denmark Open	Super 750	(China) Liu Shengshu	(Japan) Rin Iwanaga (Japan) Kie Nakanishi	18–21, 14–21	(silver) Runner-up	
2024	Japan Masters	Super 500	(China) Liu Shengshu	(Japan) Yuki Fukushima (Japan) Mayu Matsumoto	21–15, 21–5	(gold) Winner	
2024	China Masters	Super 750	(China) Liu Shengshu	(China) Li Yijing (China) Luo Xumin	21–10, 21–10	(gold) Winner	
2025	Swiss Open	Super 300	(China) Liu Shengshu	(China) Jia Yifan (China) Zhang Shuxian	19–21, 21–14, 17–21	(silver) Runner-up	
2025	Malaysia Masters	Super 500	(China) Liu Shengshu	(China) Jia Yifan (China) Zhang Shuxian	21–17, 21–18	(gold) Winner	
2025	Indonesia Open	Super 1000	(China) Liu Shengshu	(Malaysia) Pearly Tan (Malaysia) Thinaah Muralitharan	23–25, 21–12, 21–19	(gold) Winner	
2025	Japan Open	Super 750	(China) Liu Shengshu	(Malaysia) Pearly Tan (Malaysia) Thinaah Muralitharan	21–15, 21–14	(gold) Winner	
2025	China Open	Super 1000	(China) Liu Shengshu	(China) Jia Yifan (China) Zhang Shuxian	24–22, 17–21, 21–14	(gold) Winner	
2026	Malaysia Open	Super 1000	(China) Liu Shengshu	(South Korea) Baek Ha-na (South Korea) Lee So-hee	21–18, 21–12	(gold) Winner	
2026	India Open	Super 750	(China) Liu Shengshu	(Japan) Yuki Fukushima (Japan) Mayu Matsumoto	21–11, 21–18	(gold) Winner	
2026	All England Open	Super 1000	(China) Liu Shengshu	(South Korea) Baek Ha-na (South Korea) Lee So-hee	21–18, 21–12	(gold) Winner	
2026	Singapore Open	Super 750	(China) Liu Shengshu	(China) Jia Yifan (China) Zhang Shuxian	20–22, 19–21	(silver) Runner-up	
2026	Indonesia Open	Super 1000	(China) Liu Shengshu	(Japan) Yuki Fukushima (Japan) Mayu Matsumoto	15–21, 21–18, 18–21	(silver) Runner-up	
2026	China Open	Super 1000	(China) Liu Shengshu	(Japan) Yuki Fukushima (Japan) Mayu Matsumoto	21–14, 21–19	(gold) Winner	

=== BWF International Challenge/Series (1 title) ===
Women's doubles
Year	Tournament	Partner	Opponent	Score	Result
2022	Malaysia International Series	(China) Liu Shengshu	(China) Li Yijing (China) Luo Xumin	24–22, 21–16	(gold) Winner

BWF International Challenge tournament
BWF International Series tournament
BWF Future Series tournament

=== BWF Junior International (1 title) ===
Girls' singles
Year	Tournament	Opponent	Score	Result
2019	Malaysia Junior International	(Indonesia) Aisyah Sativa Fatetani	17–21, 21–19, 21–8	(gold) Winner

BWF Junior International Grand Prix tournament
BWF Junior International Challenge tournament
BWF Junior International Series tournament
BWF Junior Future Series tournament
