= 2023 BWF World Championships – Women's doubles =

Badminton championships

Women's doubles at the 2023 BWF World Championships
- Venue: Royal Arena
- Location: Copenhagen, Denmark
- Dates: 21–27 August
- Competitors: 96 from 31 nations

Medalists
gold medal	Chen Qingchen; Jia Yifan	China
silver medal	Apriyani Rahayu; Siti Fadia Silva Ramadhanti	Indonesia
bronze medal	Zhang Shuxian; Zheng Yu	China
bronze medal	Kim So-yeong; Kong Hee-yong	South Korea

The women's doubles tournament of the 2023 BWF World Championships took place from 21 to 27 August 2023 at the Royal Arena in Copenhagen.

== Seeds ==
The seeding list was based on the World Rankings of 1 August 2023.

1. (China) Chen Qingchen / Jia Yifan (champions)
2. (South Korea) Baek Ha-na / Lee So-hee (third round)
3. (South Korea) Kim So-yeong / Kong Hee-yong (semi-finals)
4. (Japan) Mayu Matsumoto / Wakana Nagahara (third round)
5. (Japan) Yuki Fukushima / Sayaka Hirota (quarter-finals)
6. (China) Zhang Shuxian / Zheng Yu (semi-finals)
7. (Japan) Nami Matsuyama / Chiharu Shida (quarter-finals)
8. (Thailand) Jongkolphan Kititharakul / Rawinda Prajongjai (quarter-finals)

9. (Thailand) Benyapa Aimsaard / Nuntakarn Aimsaard (withdrew)
10. (Malaysia) Pearly Tan / Thinaah Muralitharan (quarter-finals)
11. (Indonesia) Apriyani Rahayu / Siti Fadia Silva Ramadhanti (final)
12. (China) Li Wenmei / Liu Xuanxuan (third round)
13. (Bulgaria) Gabriela Stoeva / Stefani Stoeva (second round)
14. (Japan) Rin Iwanaga / Kie Nakanishi (third round)
15. (India) Gayatri Gopichand / Treesa Jolly (third round)
16. (Indonesia) Febriana Dwipuji Kusuma / Amallia Cahaya Pratiwi (third round)

Click on the seed number of a player to go to their draw section.

== Draw ==
The drawing ceremony was held on 10 August 2023.

=== Finals ===
Semi-finals
1	(China) Chen Qingchen (China) Jia Yifan	21	21
6	(China) Zhang Shuxian (China) Zheng Yu	14	16
3	(South Korea) Kim So-yeong (South Korea) Kong Hee-yong	9	20
11	(Indonesia) Apriyani Rahayu (Indonesia) Siti Fadia Silva Ramadhanti	21	22

Final
1	(China) Chen Qingchen (China) Jia Yifan	21	21
11	(Indonesia) Apriyani Rahayu (Indonesia) Siti Fadia Silva Ramadhanti	16	12

=== Top half ===
==== Section 1 ====
First round
(Indonesia) L T Mayasari (Indonesia) R Sugiarto	14	22	21
(Germany) S Küspert (Germany) E Moszczynski	21	20	15
(Chinese Taipei) Chang C-h (Chinese Taipei) Yang C-t	21	21
(Estonia) K-K Marran (Estonia) H Rüütel	14	11
(Ukraine) M Stoliarenko (Ukraine) Y Zharka	21	11
(Chinese Taipei) Lee C-h (Chinese Taipei) Teng C-h	23	21
(Canada) C Choi (Canada) J Wu	12	15
(Denmark) M Fruergaard (Denmark) S Thygesen	21	21

Second round
1	(China) Chen QC (China) Jia YF	21	21
(Indonesia) L T Mayasari (Indonesia) R Sugiarto	5	8
15	(India) G Gopichand (India) T Jolly	21	21
(Chinese Taipei) Chang C-h (Chinese Taipei) Yang C-t	18	10
7	(Japan) N Matsuyama (Japan) C Shida	21	21
(Chinese Taipei) Lee C-h (Chinese Taipei) Teng C-h	16	15
14	(Japan) R Iwanaga (Japan) K Nakanishi	21	20	23
(Denmark) M Fruergaard (Denmark) S Thygesen	17	22	21

Third round
1	(China) Chen QC (China) Jia YF	21	21
15	(India) G Gopichand (India) T Jolly	14	9
7	(Japan) N Matsuyama (Japan) C Shida	21	21
14	(Japan) R Iwanaga (Japan) K Nakanishi	13	11

Quarter-finals
1	(China) Chen QC (China) Jia YF	21	16	21
7	(Japan) N Matsuyama (Japan) C Shida	15	21	16

==== Section 2 ====
First round
(South Africa) A Ackerman (South Africa) D Laurens	12	21	22
(Austria) S Au Yeong (Austria) K Hochmeir	21	13	24
(Scotland) J MacPherson (Scotland) C Torrance	25	21
(Australia) K Ea (Australia) G Somerville	23	19
(Brazil) J Lima (Brazil) S Lima	22	21
(England) A Harris (England) A Lado	20	19
(Netherlands) K de Wit (Netherlands) A Tirtosentono	21	21
(Maldives) A N Abdul Razzaq (Maldives) F N Abdul Razzaq	13	10

Second round
4	(Japan) M Matsumoto (Japan) W Nagahara	21	21
(Austria) S Au Yeong (Austria) K Hochmeir	11	5
10	(Malaysia) P Tan (Malaysia) Thinaah M	21	21
(Scotland) J MacPherson (Scotland) C Torrance	15	10
6	(China) Zhang SX (China) Zheng Y	21	21
(Brazil) J Lima (Brazil) S Lima	12	15
9	(Thailand) B Aimsaard (Thailand) N Aimsaard
(Netherlands) K de Wit (Netherlands) A Tirtosentono	w	/	o

Third round
4	(Japan) M Matsumoto (Japan) W Nagahara	14	20
10	(Malaysia) P Tan (Malaysia) Thinaah M	21	22
6	(China) Zhang SX (China) Zheng Y	21	21
(Netherlands) K de Wit (Netherlands) A Tirtosentono	13	10

Quarter-finals
10	(Malaysia) P Tan (Malaysia) Thinaah M	21	17	19
6	(China) Zhang SX (China) Zheng Y	17	21	21

=== Bottom half ===
==== Section 3 ====
First round
(France) M Lambert (France) A Tran	21	21
(Hong Kong) Lui L L (Hong Kong) Ng W Y	16	14
(United States) A Xu (United States) K Xu	14	18
(Malaysia) A Cheong (Malaysia) Teoh M X	21	21
(Hong Kong) Yeung N T (Hong Kong) Yeung P L	21	21
(Germany) L Efler (Germany) I Lohau	9	17
(Chinese Taipei) Hsu Y-c (Chinese Taipei) Lin W-c	21	21
(Mauritius) L Bodha (Mauritius) K Dookhee	4	5

Second round
(France) M Lambert (France) A Tran	21	11
16	(Indonesia) F D Kusuma (Indonesia) A C Pratiwi	23	21
(Malaysia) A Cheong (Malaysia) Teoh M X	13	11
8	(Thailand) J Kititharakul (Thailand) R Prajongjai	21	21
(Hong Kong) Yeung N T (Hong Kong) Yeung P L	21	21
13	(Bulgaria) G Stoeva (Bulgaria) S Stoeva	18	8
(Chinese Taipei) Hsu Y-c (Chinese Taipei) Lin W-c	21	25	11
3	(South Korea) Kim S-y (South Korea) Kong H-y	17	27	21

Third round
16	(Indonesia) F D Kusuma (Indonesia) A C Pratiwi	14	21	19
8	(Thailand) J Kititharakul (Thailand) R Prajongjai	21	17	21
(Hong Kong) Yeung N T (Hong Kong) Yeung P L	19	11
3	(South Korea) Kim S-y (South Korea) Kong H-y	21	21

Quarter-finals
8	(Thailand) J Kititharakul (Thailand) R Prajongjai	19	19
3	(South Korea) Kim S-y (South Korea) Kong H-y	21	21

==== Section 4 ====
First round
(England) C Birch (England) L Smith	10	11
(Singapore) Jin YJ (Singapore) C Wong	21	21
(Malaysia) V Hoo (Malaysia) Lim C S	21	21
(Sweden) M Sjöö (Sweden) T Sjöö	14	12
(Netherlands) D Jille (Netherlands) C Seinen	21	11	21
(India) A Bhat (India) S Gautam	14	21	14
(Peru) I Castillo (Peru) P la Torre Regal	7	12
(United States) F Corbett (United States) A Lee	21	21

Second round
(Singapore) Jin YJ (Singapore) C Wong	18	11
12	(China) Li WM (China) Liu XX	21	21
(Malaysia) V Hoo (Malaysia) Lim C S	11	14
5	(Japan) Y Fukushima (Japan) S Hirota	21	21
(Netherlands) D Jille (Netherlands) C Seinen	21	14	16
11	(Indonesia) A Rahayu (Indonesia) S F S Ramadhanti	19	21	21
(United States) F Corbett (United States) A Lee	14	13
2	(South Korea) Baek H-n (South Korea) Lee S-h	21	21

Third round
12	(China) Li WM (China) Liu XX	7	15
5	(Japan) Y Fukushima (Japan) S Hirota	21	21
11	(Indonesia) A Rahayu (Indonesia) S F S Ramadhanti	21	21
2	(South Korea) Baek H-n (South Korea) Lee S-h	12	14

Quarter-finals
5	(Japan) Y Fukushima (Japan) S Hirota	18	21	10
11	(Indonesia) A Rahayu (Indonesia) S F S Ramadhanti	21	13	21

== Qualifiers' performances ==
The table below lists out all the qualifiers of this edition by 4 August 2023.

Pair	Date of birth	Pair statistics			Individual statistics			Note
Pair	Date of birth	Appearance	Best Performance(s)		Appearance	Best Performance(s)		Note
Pair	Date of birth	Appearance	Edition(s)	Result	Appearance	Edition(s)	Result	Note
Champions
(China) Chen Qingchen	23 June 1997 (aged 26)	6th	17, 21, 22	G	6th	17, 21, 22	G	Reigning world champion, =PB
(China) Jia Yifan	29 June 1997 (aged 26)	6th	17, 21, 22	G	6th	17, 21, 22	G	Reigning world champion, =PB
Finalist
(Indonesia) Apriyani Rahayu	29 April 1998 (aged 25)	Debut			3rd	18, 19	B	Reigning Olympic champion, PB
(Indonesia) Siti Fadia Silva Ramadhanti	16 November 2000 (aged 22)	Debut			3rd	22	2R	PB
Semi-finalist
(China) Zhang Shuxian	2 January 2000 (aged 23)	2nd	22	QF	2nd	22	QF	PB
(China) Zheng Yu	7 January 1996 (aged 27)	2nd	22	QF	4th	22	QF	PB
(South Korea) Kim So-yeong	9 July 1992 (aged 31)	4th	22	S	6th	22	S	
(South Korea) Kong Hee-yong	11 December 1996 (aged 26)	4th	22	S	4th	22	S	
Quarter-finalist
(Japan) Yuki Fukushima	6 May 1993 (aged 30)	4th	17, 18, 19	S	4th	17, 18, 19	S	Reigning Asian champion
(Japan) Sayaka Hirota	1 August 1994 (aged 29)	4th	17, 18, 19	S	4th	17, 18, 19	S	Reigning Asian champion
(Japan) Nami Matsuyama	28 June 1998 (aged 25)	3rd	21, 22	QF	3rd	21, 22	QF	=PB
(Japan) Chiharu Shida	29 April 1997 (aged 26)	3rd	21, 22	QF	3rd	21, 22	QF	=PB
(Malaysia) Pearly Tan	14 March 2000 (aged 23)	3rd	22	3R	3rd	22	3R	PB
(Malaysia) Thinaah Muralitharan	3 January 1998 (aged 25)	3rd	22	3R	3rd	22	3R	PB
(Thailand) Jongkolphan Kititharakul	1 March 1993 (aged 30)	6th	18, 21, 22	QF	6th	18, 21, 22	QF	=PB
(Thailand) Rawinda Prajongjai	29 June 1993 (aged 30)	6th	18, 21, 22	QF	6th	18, 21, 22	QF	=PB
Third rounders
(China) Li Wenmei	2 November 1999 (aged 23)	Debut			5th	19, 21, 22	3R	=PB
(China) Liu Xuanxuan	18 June 2000 (aged 23)	Debut			3rd	21, 22	2R	PB
(Hong Kong) Yeung Nga Ting	13 October 1998 (aged 24)	2nd	22	2R	6th	21	3R	=PB
(Hong Kong) Yeung Pui Lam	26 October 2001 (aged 21)	2nd	22	2R	2nd	22	2R	PB
(India) Gayatri Gopichand	4 March 2003 (aged 20)	2nd	22	2R	2nd	22	2R	PB
(India) Treesa Jolly	27 May 2003 (aged 20)	2nd	22	2R	2nd	22	2R	PB
(Indonesia) Febriana Dwipuji Kusuma	20 February 2001 (aged 22)	2nd	22	1R	2nd	22	1R	PB
(Indonesia) Amallia Cahaya Pratiwi	14 October 2001 (aged 21)	2nd	22	1R	2nd	22	1R	PB
(Japan) Rin Iwanaga	21 May 1999 (aged 24)	3rd	21	QF	3rd	21	QF	
(Japan) Kie Nakanishi	24 December 1995 (aged 27)	3rd	21	QF	3rd	21	QF	
(Japan) Mayu Matsumoto	7 August 1995 (aged 28)	5th	18, 19	G	5th	18, 19	G	
(Japan) Wakana Nagahara	9 January 1996 (aged 27)	5th	18, 19	G	5th	18, 19	G	
(Netherlands) Kirsten de Wit	16 March 2004 (aged 19)	Debut			Debut			PB
(Netherlands) Alyssa Tirtosentono	29 May 2000 (aged 23)	Debut			2nd	21	2R	PB
(South Korea) Baek Ha-na	22 September 2000 (aged 22)	Debut			2nd	22	2R	PB
(South Korea) Lee So-hee	14 June 1994 (aged 29)	Debut			9th	21	S	Most participated qualifier
Second rounders
(Austria) Serena Au Yeong	28 August 2000 (aged 22)	3rd	21, 22	1R	3rd	21, 22	1R	PB
(Austria) Katharina Hochmeir	21 June 1998 (aged 25)	3rd	21, 22	1R	3rd	21, 22	1R	PB
(Brazil) Jaqueline Lima	23 April 2001 (aged 22)	3rd	21	2R	3rd	21	2R	=PB
(Brazil) Sâmia Lima	8 June 2000 (aged 23)	3rd	21	2R	3rd	21	2R	=PB
(Bulgaria) Gabriela Stoeva	15 July 1994 (aged 29)	9th	21	QF	9th	21	QF	Reigning European champion, and most participated pair
(Bulgaria) Stefani Stoeva	23 September 1995 (aged 27)	9th	21	QF	9th	21	QF	Reigning European champion, and most participated pair
(Chinese Taipei) Chang Chang-hui	17 May 1996 (aged 27)	4th	17, 18	2R	5th	17, 18	2R	=PB
(Chinese Taipei) Yang Ching-tun	17 November 1995 (aged 27)	4th	17, 18	2R	4th	17, 18	2R	=PB
(Chinese Taipei) Hsu Ya-ching	30 July 1991 (aged 32)	Debut			4th	15, 19	2R	=PB
(Chinese Taipei) Lin Wan-ching	1 November 1995 (aged 27)	Debut			Debut			PB
(Chinese Taipei) Lee Chia-hsin	11 May 1997 (aged 26)	Debut			Debut			PB
(Chinese Taipei) Teng Chun-hsun	27 September 2000 (aged 22)	Debut			Debut			PB
(Denmark) Maiken Fruergaard	11 May 1995 (aged 28)	6th	17, 18, 19, 21, 22	3R	6th	17, 18, 19, 21, 22	3R	
(Denmark) Sara Thygesen	20 January 1991 (aged 32)	6th	17, 18, 19, 21, 22	3R	6th	17, 18, 19, 21, 22	3R	
(France) Margot Lambert	15 March 1999 (aged 24)	2nd	22	2R	2nd	22	2R	=PB
(France) Anne Tran	27 April 1996 (aged 27)	2nd	22	2R	5th	17, 18, 19, 22	2R	=PB
(Indonesia) Lanny Tria Mayasari	8 May 2002 (aged 21)	Debut			Debut			PB
(Indonesia) Ribka Sugiarto	22 January 2000 (aged 23)	Debut			2nd	22	2R	=PB
(Malaysia) Anna Cheong	15 March 1998 (aged 25)	2nd	22	2R	3rd	22	2R	=PB
(Malaysia) Teoh Mei Xing	6 March 1997 (aged 26)	2nd	22	2R	3rd	22	2R	=PB
(Malaysia) Vivian Hoo	19 March 1990 (aged 33)	2nd	22	3R	7th	13, 19, 22	3R	Oldest qualifier
(Malaysia) Lim Chiew Sien	14 May 1994 (aged 29)	2nd	22	3R	2nd	22	3R	
(Netherlands) Debora Jille	11 September 1999 (aged 23)	2nd	22	2R	3rd	18, 22	2R	=PB
(Netherlands) Cheryl Seinen	4 August 1995 (aged 28)	2nd	22	2R	3rd	19, 22	2R	=PB
(Scotland) Julie MacPherson	17 November 1997 (aged 25)	3rd	22	2R	4th	22	2R	=PB
(Scotland) Ciara Torrance	1 September 1999 (aged 23)	3rd	22	2R	3rd	22	2R	=PB
(Singapore) Jin Yujia	6 February 1997 (aged 26)	2nd	22	3R	2nd	22	3R	
(Singapore) Crystal Wong	2 August 1999 (aged 24)	2nd	22	3R	2nd	22	3R	
(United States) Francesca Corbett	3 June 2005 (aged 18)	2nd	22	1R	2nd	22	1R	Youngest qualifier, PB
(United States) Allison Lee	24 March 2005 (aged 18)	2nd	22	1R	2nd	22	1R	PB
First rounders
(Australia) Kaitlyn Ea	25 June 2003 (aged 20)	Debut			Debut			PB
(Australia) Gronya Somerville	10 May 1995 (aged 28)	Debut			4th	13, 14, 19	2R	
(Canada) Catherine Choi	1 May 2001 (aged 22)	2nd	22	2R	2nd	22	2R	Reigning Pan American champion
(Canada) Josephine Wu	20 January 1995 (aged 28)	2nd	22	2R	3rd	22	2R	Reigning Pan American champion
(England) Chloe Birch	16 September 1995 (aged 27)	3rd	21	3R	3rd	21	3R	
(England) Lauren Smith	26 September 1991 (aged 31)	3rd	21	3R	8th	21	3R	
(England) Abbygael Harris	18 May 2001 (aged 22)	Debut			Debut			PB
(England) Annie Lado	23 February 2002 (aged 21)	Debut			Debut			PB
(Estonia) Kati-Kreet Marran	13 July 1998 (aged 25)	4th	19, 21, 22	1R	4th	19, 21, 22	1R	=PB
(Estonia) Helina Rüütel	11 August 1997 (aged 26)	4th	19, 21, 22	1R	5th	17	2R	
(Germany) Linda Efler	23 January 1995 (aged 28)	4th	19	2R	4th	18, 19	2R	
(Germany) Isabel Lohau	17 March 1992 (aged 31)	4th	19	2R	9th	14, 17, 18, 19	2R	Most participated qualifier
(Germany) Stine Küspert	24 July 1999 (aged 24)	2nd	22	1R	2nd	22	1R	=PB
(Germany) Emma Moszczynski	7 June 2001 (aged 22)	2nd	22	1R	2nd	22	1R	=PB
(Hong Kong) Lui Lok Lok	22 September 2002 (aged 20)	Debut			Debut			PB
(Hong Kong) Ng Wing Yung	17 May 1995 (aged 28)	Debut			5th	21	3R	
(India) Ashwini Bhat	10 January 2000 (aged 23)	2nd	22	2R	2nd	22	2R	
(India) Shikha Gautam	18 April 1998 (aged 25)	2nd	22	2R	2nd	22	2R	
(Maldives) Aminatha Nabeeha Abdul Razzaq	13 June 1999 (aged 24)	2nd	22	1R	2nd	22	1R	=PB
(Maldives) Fathimath Nabaaha Abdul Razzaq	13 June 1999 (aged 24)	2nd	22	1R	2nd	22	1R	=PB
(Mauritius) Lorna Bodha	22 January 2003 (aged 20)	Debut			Debut			PB
(Mauritius) Kobita Dookhee	13 August 1998 (aged 25)	Debut			Debut			PB
(Peru) Inés Castillo	7 December 1999 (aged 23)	3rd	21	2R	3rd	21	2R	
(Peru) Paula la Torre Regal	15 April 1999 (aged 24)	3rd	21	2R	3rd	21	2R	
(South Africa) Amy Ackerman	16 March 2005 (aged 18)	Debut			Debut			PB
(South Africa) Deidre Laurens	29 March 1995 (aged 28)	Debut			Debut			PB
(Sweden) Moa Sjöö	30 May 1997 (aged 26)	Debut			Debut			PB
(Sweden) Tilda Sjöö	10 July 2000 (aged 23)	Debut			Debut			PB
(United States) Annie Xu	22 October 1999 (aged 23)	Debut			Debut			PB
(United States) Kerry Xu	22 October 1999 (aged 23)	Debut			Debut			PB
(Ukraine) Mariia Stoliarenko	30 April 2004 (aged 19)	2nd	22	1R	2nd	22	1R	=PB
(Ukraine) Yelyzaveta Zharka	14 June 1992 (aged 31)	2nd	22	1R	6th	19	2R	
Withdrew
(Thailand) Benyapa Aimsaard	29 August 2002 (aged 20)	–	21, 22	2R	–	21, 22	2R	
(Thailand) Nuntakarn Aimsaard	23 May 1999 (aged 24)	–	21, 22	2R	–	21, 22	2R	
