= 2022 BWF World Championships – Women's doubles =

Badminton championships

Women's doubles at the 2022 BWF World Championships
- Venue: Tokyo Metropolitan Gymnasium
- Location: Tokyo, Japan
- Dates: 22–28 August
- Competitors: 46 from 27 nations

Medalists
gold medal	Chen Qingchen; Jia Yifan	China
silver medal	Kim So-yeong; Kong Hee-yong	South Korea
bronze medal	Mayu Matsumoto; Wakana Nagahara	Japan
bronze medal	Puttita Supajirakul; Sapsiree Taerattanachai	Thailand

The women's doubles tournament of the 2022 BWF World Championships took place from 22 to 28 August 2022 at the Tokyo Metropolitan Gymnasium in Tokyo.

== Seeds ==
The seeding list was based on the World Rankings of 9 August 2022.

1. (China) Chen Qingchen / Jia Yifan (champions)
2. (Japan) Yuki Fukushima / Sayaka Hirota (withdrew)
3. (South Korea) Lee So-hee / Shin Seung-chan (quarter-finals)
4. (South Korea) Kim So-yeong / Kong Hee-yong (final)
5. (Japan) Nami Matsuyama / Chiharu Shida (quarter-finals)
6. (Japan) Mayu Matsumoto / Wakana Nagahara (semi-finals)
7. (Thailand) Jongkolphan Kititharakul / Rawinda Prajongjai (quarter-finals)
8. (Bulgaria) Gabriela Stoeva / Stefani Stoeva (third round)

9. (South Korea) Jeong Na-eun / Kim Hye-jeong (third round)
10. (Malaysia) Pearly Tan / Thinaah Muralitharan (third round)
11. (China) Zhang Shuxian / Zheng Yu (quarter-finals)
12. (Denmark) Maiken Fruergaard / Sara Thygesen (third round)
13. (China) Du Yue / Li Wenmei (third round)
14. (Thailand) Puttita Supajirakul / Sapsiree Taerattanachai (semi-finals)
15. (Japan) Rin Iwanaga / Kie Nakanishi (third round)
16. (Canada) Rachel Honderich / Kristen Tsai (withdrew)

Click on the seed number of a player to go to their draw section.

== Draw ==
=== Finals ===
Semi-finals
1	(China) Chen Qingchen (China) Jia Yifan	21	21
6	(Japan) Mayu Matsumoto (Japan) Wakana Nagahara	13	14
4	(South Korea) Kim So-yeong (South Korea) Kong Hee-yong	21	19	25
14	(Thailand) Puttita Supajirakul (Thailand) Sapsiree Taerattanachai	16	21	23

Final
1	(China) Chen Qingchen (China) Jia Yifan	22	21
4	(South Korea) Kim So-yeong (South Korea) Kong Hee-yong	20	14

=== Top half ===
==== Section 1 ====
First Round
(Maldives) A N Abdul Razzaq (Maldives) F N Abdul Razzaq	7	9
(India) A Ponnappa (India) N. S Reddy	21	21
(Republic of Ireland) K Frost (Republic of Ireland) M Ryan	7	8
(Hong Kong) Yeung N T (Hong Kong) Yeung P L	21	21
(Indonesia) S F S Ramadhanti (Indonesia) R Sugiarto	21	21
(Chinese Taipei) Chang C-h (Chinese Taipei) Yang C-t	14	8
(Ukraine) M Stoliarenko (Ukraine) Y Zharka	13	14
(Netherlands) D Jille (Netherlands) C Seinen	21	21

Second Round
1	(China) Chen QC (China) Jia YF	21	21
(India) A Ponnappa (India) N. S Reddy	15	10
12	(Denmark) M Fruergaard (Denmark) S Thygesen	21	21
(Hong Kong) Yeung N T (Hong Kong) Yeung P L	17	13
7	(Thailand) J Kititharakul (Thailand) R Prajongjai	21	10	21
(Indonesia) S F S Ramadhanti (Indonesia) R Sugiarto	15	21	15
15	(Japan) R Iwanaga (Japan) K Nakanishi	23	21
(Netherlands) D Jille (Netherlands) C Seinen	21	15

Third Round
1	(China) Chen QC (China) Jia YF	21	21
12	(Denmark) M Fruergaard (Denmark) S Thygesen	15	9
7	(Thailand) J Kititharakul (Thailand) R Prajongjai	19	21	21
15	(Japan) R Iwanaga (Japan) K Nakanishi	21	10	12

Quarter-finals
1	(China) Chen QC (China) Jia YF	21	21
7	(Thailand) J Kititharakul (Thailand) R Prajongjai	16	7

==== Section 2 ====
First Round
(Peru) I Castillo (Peru) P la Torre Regal	6	21	14
(India) P Dandu (India) S Santosh	21	10	21
(Malaysia) V Hoo (Malaysia) Lim C S	21	21
(Germany) L Efler (Germany) I Lohau	17	15
(Thailand) B Aimsaard (Thailand) N Aimsaard	21	21
(Estonia) K-K Marran (Estonia) H Rüütel	14	9
(China) Liu XX (China) Xia YT	21	21
(Brazil) J Lima (Brazil) S Lima	7	7

Second Round
3	(South Korea) Lee S-h (South Korea) Shin S-c	21	21
(India) P Dandu (India) S Santosh	15	7
16	(Canada) R Honderich (Canada) K Tsai
(Malaysia) V Hoo (Malaysia) Lim C S	w	/	o
6	(Japan) M Matsumoto (Japan) W Nagahara	21	21
(Thailand) B Aimsaard (Thailand) N Aimsaard	17	18
13	(China) Du Y (China) Li WM	21	21
(China) Liu XX (China) Xia YT	17	13

Third Round
3	(South Korea) Lee S-h (South Korea) Shin S-c	21	21
(Malaysia) V Hoo (Malaysia) Lim C S	13	16
6	(Japan) M Matsumoto (Japan) W Nagahara	21	21
13	(China) Du Y (China) Li WM	13	9

Quarter-finals
3	(South Korea) Lee S-h (South Korea) Shin S-c	13	21	12
6	(Japan) M Matsumoto (Japan) W Nagahara	21	19	21

=== Bottom half ===
==== Section 3 ====
First Round
(Malaysia) Low Y Y (Malaysia) V Siow	11	13
(India) T Jolly (India) G Gopichand	21	21
(France) F Vallet (France) E Vercelot	20	12
(Canada) C Choi (Canada) J Wu	22	21
(Malaysia) A Cheong (Malaysia) Teoh M X	21	21
(Germany) E Moszczynski (Germany) S Küspert	13	15
(Italy) M Corsini (Italy) J Mair	8	14
(India) A Bhat (India) S Gautam	21	21

Second Round
(India) T Jolly (India) G Gopichand	8	17
10	(Malaysia) P Tan (Malaysia) Thinaah M	21	21
(Canada) C Choi (Canada) J Wu	17	9
5	(Japan) N Matsuyama (Japan) C Shida	21	21
(Malaysia) A Cheong (Malaysia) Teoh M X	13	12
9	(South Korea) Jeong N-e (South Korea) Kim H-j	21	21
(India) A Bhat (India) S Gautam	5	21	13
4	(South Korea) Kim S-y (South Korea) Kong H-y	21	18	21

Third Round
10	(Malaysia) P Tan (Malaysia) Thinaah M	16	16
5	(Japan) N Matsuyama (Japan) C Shida	21	21
9	(South Korea) Jeong N-e (South Korea) Kim H-j	19	19
4	(South Korea) Kim S-y (South Korea) Kong H-y	21	21

Quarter-finals
5	(Japan) N Matsuyama (Japan) C Shida	16	15
4	(South Korea) Kim S-y (South Korea) Kong H-y	21	21

==== Section 4 ====
First Round
(France) M Lambert (France) A Tran	21	21
(Indonesia) F D Kusuma (Indonesia) A C Pratiwi	18	19
(South Korea) Baek H-n (South Korea) Lee Y-r	21	21
(Sweden) J Magnusson (Sweden) C Nistad	13	8
(Scotland) J MacPherson (Scotland) C Torrance	21	21
(United States) F Corbett (United States) A Lee	18	3
(Austria) S Au Yeong (Austria) K Hochmeir	12	7
(Singapore) Jin YJ (Singapore) C Wong	21	21

Second Round
(France) M Lambert (France) A Tran	20	18
14	(Thailand) P Supajirakul (Thailand) S Taerattanachai	22	21
(South Korea) Baek H-n (South Korea) Lee Y-r	13	9
8	(Bulgaria) G Stoeva (Bulgaria) S Stoeva	21	21
(Scotland) J MacPherson (Scotland) C Torrance	14	17
11	(China) Zhang SX (China) Zheng Y	21	21
(Singapore) Jin YJ (Singapore) C Wong	w	/	o
2	(Japan) Y Fukushima (Japan) S Hirota

Third Round
14	(Thailand) P Supajirakul (Thailand) S Taerattanachai	21	21
8	(Bulgaria) G Stoeva (Bulgaria) S Stoeva	13	12
11	(China) Zhang SX (China) Zheng Y	21	21
(Singapore) Jin YJ (Singapore) C Wong	15	14

Quarter-finals
14	(Thailand) P Supajirakul (Thailand) S Taerattanachai	15	21	22
11	(China) Zhang SX (China) Zheng Y	21	18	20
