= 2018 BWF World Championships – Women's doubles =

Women's doubles at the BWF World Championships
- Venue: Nanjing Youth Olympic Sports Park Indoor Arena
- Location: Nanjing, China
- Dates: 30 July – 5 August

Medalists
gold medal	Mayu Matsumoto; Wakana Nagahara	Japan
silver medal	Yuki Fukushima; Sayaka Hirota	Japan
bronze medal	Greysia Polii; Apriyani Rahayu	Indonesia
bronze medal	Shiho Tanaka; Koharu Yonemoto	Japan

The women's doubles tournament of the 2018 BWF World Championships (World Badminton Championships) took place from 30 July to 5 August.

== Seeds ==
The seeding list is based on the World Rankings from 12 July 2018.

1. (China) Chen Qingchen / Jia Yifan (quarterfinals)
2. (Japan) Yuki Fukushima / Sayaka Hirota (final)
3. (Japan) Misaki Matsutomo / Ayaka Takahashi (third round)
4. (Japan) Shiho Tanaka / Koharu Yonemoto (semifinals)
5. (Indonesia) Greysia Polii / Apriyani Rahayu (semifinals)
6. (South Korea) Lee So-hee / Shin Seung-chan (third round)
7. (Thailand) Jongkolphan Kititharakul / Rawinda Prajongjai (quarterfinals)
8. (Indonesia) Della Destiara Haris / Rizki Amelia Pradipta (quarterfinals)

9. (Bulgaria) Gabriela Stoeva / Stefani Stoeva (third round)
10. (China) Du Yue / Li Yinhui (third round)
11. (Japan) Mayu Matsumoto / Wakana Nagahara (champions)
12. (China) Huang Yaqiong / Yu Xiaohan (third round)
13. (Malaysia) Chow Mei Kuan / Lee Meng Yean (third round)
14. (Indonesia) Anggia Shitta Awanda / Ni Ketut Mahadewi Istarani (quarterfinals)
15. (Denmark) Maiken Fruergaard / Sara Thygesen (third round)
16. (Thailand) Chayanit Chaladchalam / Phataimas Muenwong (third round)

Click on the seed number of a player to go to their draw section.

== Draw ==
=== Finals ===
Semifinals
5	(Indonesia) Greysia Polii (Indonesia) Apriyani Rahayu	12	21
11	(Japan) Mayu Matsumoto (Japan) Wakana Nagahara	21	23
4	(Japan) Shiho Tanaka (Japan) Koharu Yonemoto	19	15
2	(Japan) Yuki Fukushima (Japan) Sayaka Hirota	21	21

Final
11	(Japan) Mayu Matsumoto (Japan) Wakana Nagahara	19	21	22
2	(Japan) Yuki Fukushima (Japan) Sayaka Hirota	21	19	20

=== Top half ===
==== Section 1 ====
First round
(Russia) E Bolotova (Russia) A Davletova	21	21
(United States) A Lee (United States) S Lee	7	9
(Peru) D Macías (Peru) D Nishimura	9	9
(France) É Lefel (France) A Tran	21	21
(Ukraine) M Ilyinskaya (Ukraine) Y Zharka	11	11
(Hong Kong) Ng W Y (Hong Kong) Yuen S Y	21	21
(Germany) I Herttrich (Germany) C Nelte	21	21
(Canada) M Tong (Canada) J Wu	13	11

Second round
1	(China) Chen QC (China) Jia YF	21	21
(Russia) E Bolotova (Russia) A Davletova	13	14
10	(China) Du Y (China) Li YH	21	21
(France) É Lefel (France) A Tran	9	14
5	(Indonesia) G Polii (Indonesia) A Rahayu	21	21
(Hong Kong) Ng W Y (Hong Kong) Yuen S Y	9	10
13	(Malaysia) Chow M K (Malaysia) Lee M Y	16	21	22
(Germany) I Herttrich (Germany) C Nelte	21	17	20

Third round
1	(China) Chen QC (China) Jia YF	21	21
10	(China) Du Y (China) Li YH	8	19
5	(Indonesia) G Polii (Indonesia) A Rahayu	21	21
13	(Malaysia) Chow M K (Malaysia) Lee M Y	18	13

Quarterfinals
1	(China) Chen QC (China) Jia YF	21	21
5	(Indonesia) G Polii (Indonesia) A Rahayu	23	23

==== Section 2 ====
First round
(Malaysia) V Hoo K M (Malaysia) Woon K W	21	22
(France) D Delrue (France) L Palermo	17	20
(Chinese Taipei) Hsu Y-c (Chinese Taipei) Wu T-j	14	21	14
(China) Huang DP (China) Li WM	21	14	21
(Germany) L Efler (Germany) E Janssens	21	21
(Egypt) D Hany (Egypt) H Hosny	15	9
(India) S Ghorpade (India) P Sawant	20	14
(Turkey) B Erçetin (Turkey) N İnci	22	21

Second round
3	(Japan) M Matsutomo (Japan) A Takahashi	21	19	21
(Malaysia) V Hoo K M (Malaysia) Woon K W	12	21	12
11	(Japan) M Matsumoto (Japan) W Nagahara	16	21	21
(China) Huang DP (China) Li WM	21	16	15
7	(Thailand) J Kititharakul (Thailand) R Prajongjai	21	21
(Germany) L Efler (Germany) E Janssens	11	11
15	(Denmark) M Fruergaard (Denmark) S Thygesen	21	21
(Turkey) B Erçetin (Turkey) N İnci	18	7

Third round
3	(Japan) M Matsutomo (Japan) A Takahashi	13	15
11	(Japan) M Matsumoto (Japan) W Nagahara	21	21
7	(Thailand) J Kititharakul (Thailand) R Prajongjai	21	21
15	(Denmark) M Fruergaard (Denmark) S Thygesen	19	13

Quarterfinals
11	(Japan) M Matsumoto (Japan) W Nagahara	21	22
7	(Thailand) J Kititharakul (Thailand) R Prajongjai	12	20

=== Bottom half ===
==== Section 3 ====
First round
(Chinese Taipei) Lin X-m (Chinese Taipei) Wu F-c	21	21
(Italy) S Garino (Italy) L Iversen	10	10
(India) M Jakkampudi (India) P S. Ram	15	21	18
(Netherlands) D Jille (Netherlands) I van der Aar	21	19	21
(Algeria) H Bouksani (Algeria) L Mazri	w	/	o
(Thailand) R Laisuan (Thailand) S Mingchua
(Netherlands) S Piek (Netherlands) C Seinen	23	21
(Indonesia) A Imanuela (Indonesia) S F S Ramadhanti	21	18

Second round
(Chinese Taipei) Lin X-m (Chinese Taipei) Wu F-c	9	14
16	(Thailand) C Chaladchalam (Thailand) P Muenwong	21	21
(Netherlands) D Jille (Netherlands) I van der Aar	8	18
8	(Indonesia) D D Haris (Indonesia) R A Pradipta	21	21
(Algeria) H Bouksani (Algeria) L Mazri	7	5
12	(China) Huang YQ (China) Yu XH	21	21
(Netherlands) S Piek (Netherlands) C Seinen	7	13
4	(Japan) S Tanaka (Japan) K Yonemoto	21	21

Third round
16	(Thailand) C Chaladchalam (Thailand) P Muenwong	16	12
8	(Indonesia) D D Haris (Indonesia) R A Pradipta	21	21
12	(China) Huang YQ (China) Yu XH	18	19
4	(Japan) S Tanaka (Japan) K Yonemoto	21	21

Quarterfinals
8	(Indonesia) D D Haris (Indonesia) R A Pradipta	21	12	15
4	(Japan) S Tanaka (Japan) K Yonemoto	17	21	21

==== Section 4 ====
First round
(India) K Garg (India) N B Hazarika	19	11
(Chinese Taipei) Chang C-h (Chinese Taipei) Yang C-t	21	21
(Hong Kong) Ng T Y (Hong Kong) Yeung N T	26	11
(Germany) J Goliszewski (Germany) L Käpplein	28	21
(Belgium) L Jaques (Belgium) F Vandenhoucke	21	21
(Germany) L Kaminski (Germany) H Pohl	11	14
(India) A Ponnappa (India) N. S Reddy	19	21	21
(Chinese Taipei) Chiang K-s (Chinese Taipei) Hung S-h	21	10	17

Second round
(Chinese Taipei) Chang C-h (Chinese Taipei) Yang C-t	14	14
14	(Indonesia) A S Awanda (Indonesia) N K M Istirani	21	21
(Germany) J Goliszewski (Germany) L Käpplein	7	17
6	(South Korea) Lee S-h (South Korea) Shin S-c	21	21
(Belgium) L Jaques (Belgium) F Vandenhoucke	13	7
9	(Bulgaria) G Stoeva (Bulgaria) S Stoeva	21	21
(India) A Ponnappa (India) N. S Reddy	14	15
2	(Japan) Y Fukushima (Japan) S Hirota	21	21

Third round
14	(Indonesia) A S Awanda (Indonesia) N K M Istirani	21	21
6	(South Korea) Lee S-h (South Korea) Shin S-c	15	17
9	(Bulgaria) G Stoeva (Bulgaria) S Stoeva	10	11
2	(Japan) Y Fukushima (Japan) S Hirota	21	21

Quarterfinals
14	(Indonesia) A S Awanda (Indonesia) N K M Istirani	17	15
2	(Japan) Y Fukushima (Japan) S Hirota	21	21
