= Shiho Tanaka =

Japanese badminton player (born 1992)

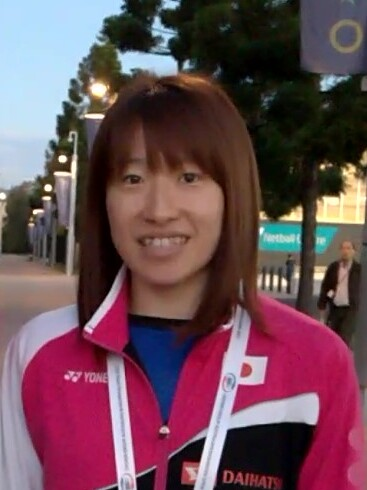
- Tanaka in 2017

Personal information
- Born: 5 September 1992 (age 34) Kumamoto Prefecture, Japan
- Height: 1.60 m (5 ft 3 in)
- Weight: 58 kg (128 lb)

Sport
- Country: Japan
- Sport: Badminton
- Handedness: Right
- Retired: 29 January 2021

Women's doubles
- Highest ranking: 4 (with Koharu Yonemoto 14 June 2018)
- BWF profile
Medal record
Women's badminton
Representing Japan
World Championships
Bronze medal – third place	2018 Nanjing	Women's doubles
Sudirman Cup
Bronze medal – third place	2017 Gold Coast	Mixed team
Uber Cup
Gold medal – first place	2018 Bangkok	Women's team
Asia Mixed Team Championships
Gold medal – first place	2017 Ho Chi Minh	Mixed team
Silver medal – second place	2019 Hong Kong	Mixed team
Asia Team Championships
Gold medal – first place	2018 Alor Setar	Women's team
Summer Universiade
Bronze medal – third place	2015 Gwangju	Women's singles

Shiho Tanaka (田中志穗, Tanaka Shiho; born 5 September 1992) is a Japanese retired badminton player who affiliates with Hokuto Bank team. She was the bronze medalists at the 2018 World Championships in the women's doubles, and at the 2015 Summer Universiade in the women's singles. She won the year-end tournament Superseries Finals in 2017. Tanaka was part of Japanese winning team at the 2017 Asia Mixed Team Championships, 2018 Uber Cup, and at the 2018 Asia Women's Team Championships.

== Career ==
In 2011, she won Osaka International tournament in women's doubles event with her partner Miri Ichimaru. In 2012, she participated at the World University Badminton Championships and won the women's doubles event after beating Chinese Taipei pairs Tai Tzu-ying and Pai Hsiao-ma 22–20, 21–11. In 2015, she became the runner-up of Chinese Taipei Masters tournament partnered with Koharu Yonemoto. In 2016, she won the US Open, and became the runner-up of Vietnam International tournaments.

Tanaka announced her retirement from the badminton tournament at the press conference in the Akita Prefectural office on 29 January 2021. She will continue her career in badminton as a coach in the Hokuto Bank. Tanaka leaves Hokuto Bank and takes on a new role as coach of Hiroshima Gas starting in the 2025 season.

== Achievements ==
=== World Championships ===
Women's doubles
Year	Venue	Partner	Opponent	Score	Result	Ref.
2018	Nanjing Youth Olympic Sports Park; Nanjing, China	(Japan) Koharu Yonemoto	(Japan) Yuki Fukushima (Japan) Sayaka Hirota	19–21, 15–21	Bronze	

=== Summer Universiade ===
Women's singles
Year	Venue	Opponent	Score	Result	Ref.
2015	Hwasun Hanium Culture Sports Center, Hwasun, South Korea	(South Korea) Sung Ji-hyun	13–21, 12–21	Bronze	

=== World University Championships ===
Women's doubles
Year	Venue	Partner	Opponent	Score	Result	Ref.
2012	Yeomju Gymnasium; Gwangju, South Korea	(Japan) Miri Ichimaru	(Chinese Taipei) Pai Hsiao-ma (Chinese Taipei) Tai Tzu-ying	22–20, 21–11	Gold	

=== BWF World Tour (1 title, 1 runner-up) ===
The BWF World Tour, which was announced on 19 March 2017 and implemented in 2018, is a series of elite badminton tournaments sanctioned by the Badminton World Federation (BWF). The BWF World Tours are divided into levels of World Tour Finals, Super 1000, Super 750, Super 500, Super 300 (part of the HSBC World Tour), and the BWF Tour Super 100.

Women's doubles
Year	Tournament	Level	Partner	Opponent	Score	Result	Ref.
2018	Denmark Open	Super 750	(Japan) Koharu Yonemoto	(Japan) Yuki Fukushima (Japan) Sayaka Hirota	19–21, 16–21	(silver) Runner-up	
2019	Thailand Open	Super 500	(Japan) Koharu Yonemoto	(China) Du Yue (China) Li Yinhui	21–19, 14–21, 21–13	(gold) Winner	

=== BWF Superseries (2 titles, 1 runner-up) ===
The BWF Superseries, which was launched on 14 December 2006 and implemented in 2007, is a series of elite badminton tournaments, sanctioned by the Badminton World Federation (BWF). BWF Superseries levels are Superseries and Superseries Premier. A season of Superseries consists of twelve tournaments around the world that have been introduced since 2011. Successful players are invited to the Superseries Finals, which are held at the end of each year.

Women's doubles
Year	Tournament	Partner	Opponent	Score	Result	Ref.
2017	India Open	(Japan) Koharu Yonemoto	(Japan) Naoko Fukuman (Japan) Kurumi Yonao	16–21, 21–19, 21–10	(gold) Winner	
2017	Denmark Open	(Japan) Koharu Yonemoto	(South Korea) Lee So-hee (South Korea) Shin Seung-chan	13–21, 16–21	(silver) Runner-up	
2017	Dubai World Superseries Finals	(Japan) Koharu Yonemoto	(Japan) Yuki Fukushima (Japan) Sayaka Hirota	21–16, 21–15	(gold) Winner	

BWF Super Series Finals tournament
BWF Super Series Premier tournament
BWF Super Series tournament

=== BWF Grand Prix (1 title, 2 runners-up) ===
The BWF Grand Prix had two levels, the Grand Prix and Grand Prix Gold. It was a series of badminton tournaments sanctioned by the Badminton World Federation (BWF) and played between 2007 and 2017.

Women's doubles
Year	Tournament	Partner	Opponent	Score	Result	Ref.
2015	Chinese Taipei Masters	(Japan) Koharu Yonemoto	(Indonesia) Anggia Shitta Awanda (Indonesia) Ni Ketut Mahadewi Istarani	19–21, 14–21	(silver) Runner-up	
2016	U.S. Open	(Japan) Koharu Yonemoto	(Japan) Mayu Matsumoto (Japan) Wakana Nagahara	20–22, 21–15, 21–19	(gold) Winner	
2016	Chinese Taipei Masters	(Japan) Koharu Yonemoto	(Japan) Yuki Fukushima (Japan) Sayaka Hirota	10–11, 5–11, 7–11	(silver) Runner-up	

BWF Grand Prix Gold tournament
BWF Grand Prix tournament

=== BWF International Challenge/Series (1 title, 1 runner-up) ===
Women's doubles
Year	Tournament	Partner	Opponent	Score	Result	Ref.
2011	Osaka International	(Japan) Miri Ichimaru	(Japan) Yuriko Miki (Japan) Koharu Yonemoto	19–21 21–18 21–14	(gold) Winner	
2016	Vietnam International	(Japan) Koharu Yonemoto	(Japan) Yuki Fukushima (Japan) Chiharu Shida	26–28, 15–21	(silver) Runner-up	

BWF International Challenge tournament
