= Rin Iwanaga =

Japanese badminton player (born 1999)

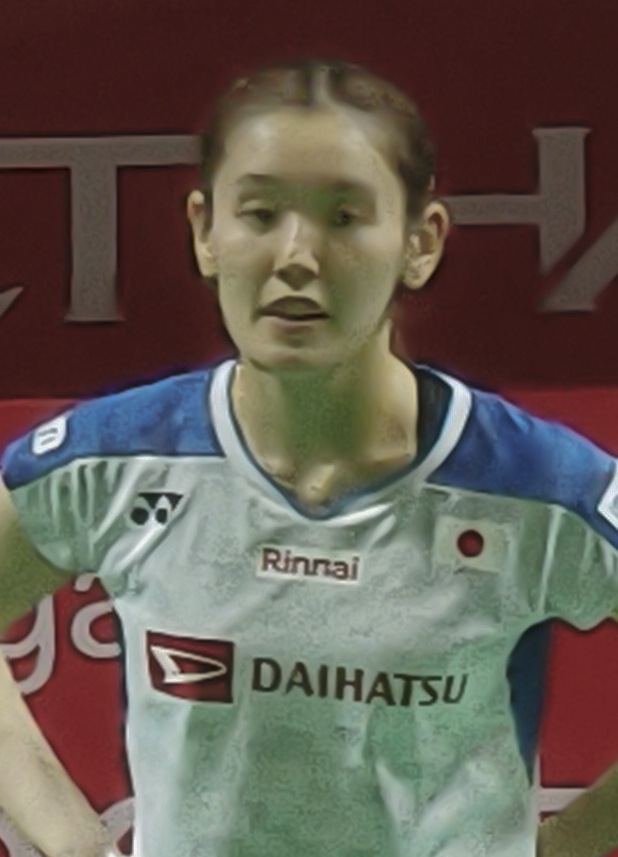
- Iwanaga at the 2026 Indonesia Open

Personal information
- Born: 21 May 1999 (age 27) Yanai, Yamaguchi, Japan
- Height: 1.66 m (5 ft 5 in)

Sport
- Country: Japan
- Sport: Badminton
- Handedness: Right
- Coached by: Kei Nakashima

Women's doubles
- Highest ranking: 4 (with Kie Nakanishi, 11 March 2025)
- Current ranking: 5 (with Kie Nakanishi, 20 October 2026)
- BWF profile
Medal record
Women's badminton
Representing Japan
World Championships
Bronze medal – third place	2025 Paris	Women's doubles
Sudirman Cup
Bronze medal – third place	2025 Xiamen	Mixed team
Uber Cup
Bronze medal – third place	2026 Horsens	Women's team
Asian Games
Silver medal – second place	2026 Aichi–Nagoya	Women's team
Bronze medal – third place	2026 Aichi–Nagoya	Women's doubles
Asian Championships
Silver medal – second place	2022 Manila	Women's doubles
Asia Mixed Team Championships
Bronze medal – third place	2025 Qingdao	Mixed team
Asia Team Championships
Bronze medal – third place	2024 Selangor	Women's team
World Junior Championships
Bronze medal – third place	2017 Yogyakarta	Mixed team
Asian Junior Championships
Bronze medal – third place	2017 Jakarta	Mixed team

Rin Iwanaga (岩永 鈴, Iwanaga Rin; born 21 May 1999) is a Japanese badminton player affiliated with the BIPROGY team. Specializing in women's doubles with partner Kie Nakanishi, she has won six BWF World Tour titles and achieved a career-high ranking of world No. 4 in March 2025.

Iwanaga's major achievements include a bronze medal at the 2025 World Championships in Paris and a silver medal at the 2022 Asian Championships in Manila. She and Nakanishi won their first BWF World Tour title at the 2023 Syed Modi International, and captured their first Super 750 title at the 2024 Denmark Open. The duo had a particularly successful 2024 season, winning five consecutive tournament finals. Iwanaga has also represented Japan in team competitions, winning bronze medals at the 2025 Asia Mixed Team Championships and Sudirman Cup.

== Career ==
=== 2021 ===
In 2021, Iwanaga and Nakanishi reached their first Super 500 final at the Hylo Open in November. They were defeated by their compatriots, Chisato Hoshi and Aoi Matsuda, securing runner-up position. Earlier that year, the pair won the Belgian International. They also competed in the Indonesia Masters (Super 750) and the Indonesia Open (Super 1000) at the Indonesia Badminton Festival in Bali but were eliminated in the early rounds of both tournaments. In December, they made their World Championship debut held in Huelva, reaching the quarterfinals. By the end of the year, they entered the top 30 world rankings, reaching world No. 26.

=== 2022 ===
In 2022, Iwanaga and Nakanishi won a silver medal at the Asian Championships held in Manila, losing to the then-World No. 1 pair Chen Qingchen and Jia Yifan of China in the final. In August, they participated in the World Championships held in Tokyo, where they were eliminated in the third round. Throughout their 2022 World Tour campaign, Iwanaga and Nakanishi experienced early-round losses for all tournaments they competed. They reached a then-new career-high ranking of world No. 15 as of 24 October 2022.

=== 2023: First BWF World Tour title, world No. 15 ===
In 2023, Iwanaga and Nakanishi won their first BWF World Tour title together at the Syed Modi International (Super 300) in November. They also reached the semifinals of the Arctic Open and the Denmark Open. At the Denmark Open, they defeated two Chinese pairs, Liu Shengshu and Tan Ning in the second round and Zhang Shuxian and Zheng Yu in the quarterfinals, before they were defeated by another Chinese pair Chen Qingchen and Jia Yifan in the semifinals. Their 2023 season also included reaching the quarterfinals in five other tournaments: the India Open, the Thailand Open, the Singapore Open, the Korea Open, and the Australia Open. They finished the year by returning to a world ranking of No. 15, after their ranking had dropped to No. 26 earlier in the year.

=== 2024 ===
In 2024, Iwanaga and Nakanishi reached the quarterfinals of the Malaysia Open in January by defeating third seeds, Kim So-yeong and Kong Hee-yong, marking their first quarterfinal appearance at a Super 1000 tournament. They won their first Super 750 title at the Denmark Open in October. This win was their fifth consecutive tournament final victory in 2024, following titles at the Spain Masters, Malaysia Masters, U.S. Open, and Canada Open. En route to the Denmark Open title, they defeated Baek Ha-na and Lee So-hee in the semifinals, achieving their first win against that pair. In the final, they beat the Paris 2024 Olympic silver medalists and then-world No. 1 pair Liu Shengshu and Tan Ning (21–18, 21–14). This victory solidified their position as the second-ranked pair in the BWF World Tour Finals rankings and was their second win over Liu and Tan in three encounters. They also competed in the BWF World Tour Finals in December but were eliminated in the round-robin stage. They reached a new career-high ranking of world No. 5 as of 4 November.

=== 2025 ===
Iwanaga began the 2025 season recovering from injuries suffered in late 2024. She injured her right shoulder in November 2024, followed by a torn abdominal muscle. Despite these injuries, Iwanaga and Nakanishi reached the final of the Singapore Open (Super 750) in June, finishing as runners-up to Kim Hye-jeong and Kong Hee-yong of South Korea. They also reached the quarterfinals at the All England Open in March, the Asian Championships in April, and the Indonesia Open in June. Iwanaga and Nakanishi reached a new career-high ranking of World No. 4 on 11 March. Additionally, Iwanaga was also part of the Japanese teams that won bronze medals at the Asia Mixed Team Championships in February and the Sudirman Cup in April.

== Personal life ==
Iwanaga married on 5 February 2026.

== Achievements ==
=== World Championships ===
Women's doubles
Year	Venue	Partner	Opponent	Score	Result	Ref.
2025	Adidas Arena; Paris, France	(Japan) Kie Nakanishi	(China) Liu Shengshu (China) Tan Ning	15–21, 4–21	Bronze	

=== Asian Games ===
Women's doubles
Year	Venue	Partner	Opponent	Score	Result	Ref.
2026	Ichinomiya City Municipal Gymnasium; Ichinomiya, Japan	(Japan) Kie Nakanishi	(South Korea) Baek Ha-na (South Korea) Lee So-hee	13–21, 12–21	Bronze	

=== Asian Championships ===
Women's doubles
Year	Venue	Partner	Opponent	Score	Result	Ref.
2022	Muntinlupa Sports Complex; Metro Manila, Philippines	(Japan) Kie Nakanishi	(China) Chen Qingchen (China) Jia Yifan	11–21, 15–21	Silver	

=== BWF World Tour (7 titles, 8 runners-up) ===
The BWF World Tour, which was announced on 19 March 2017 and implemented in 2018, is a series of elite badminton tournaments sanctioned by the Badminton World Federation (BWF). The BWF World Tour is divided into levels of World Tour Finals, Super 1000, Super 750, Super 500, Super 300 (part of the HSBC World Tour), and the BWF Tour Super 100.

Women's doubles
Year	Tournament	Level	Partner	Opponent	Score	Result	Ref.
2019	Dutch Open	Super 100	(Japan) Kie Nakanishi	(Bulgaria) Gabriela Stoeva (Bulgaria) Stefani Stoeva	10–21, 20–22	(silver) Runner-up	
2021	Hylo Open	Super 500	(Japan) Kie Nakanishi	(Japan) Chisato Hoshi (Japan) Aoi Matsuda	20–22, 18–21	(silver) Runner-up	
2023	Syed Modi International	Super 300	(Japan) Kie Nakanishi	(India) Tanisha Crasto (India) Ashwini Ponnappa	21–14, 17–21, 21–15	(gold) Winner	
2024	Spain Masters	Super 300	(Japan) Kie Nakanishi	(Indonesia) Febriana Dwipuji Kusuma (Indonesia) Amallia Cahaya Pratiwi	12–21, 21–8, 21–16	(gold) Winner	
2024	Malaysia Masters	Super 500	(Japan) Kie Nakanishi	(South Korea) Lee Yu-lim (South Korea) Shin Seung-chan	17–21, 21–19, 21–18	(gold) Winner	
2024	U.S. Open	Super 300	(Japan) Kie Nakanishi	(Thailand) Laksika Kanlaha (Thailand) Phataimas Muenwong	21–19, 21–15	(gold) Winner	
2024	Canada Open	Super 500	(Japan) Kie Nakanishi	(Chinese Taipei) Hsu Yin-hui (Chinese Taipei) Lin Jhih-yun	21–13, 21–13	(gold) Winner	
2024	Denmark Open	Super 750	(Japan) Kie Nakanishi	(China) Liu Shengshu (China) Tan Ning	21–18, 21–14	(gold) Winner	
2025	Singapore Open	Super 750	(Japan) Kie Nakanishi	(South Korea) Kim Hye-jeong (South Korea) Kong Hee-yong	16–21, 14–21	(silver) Runner-up	
2025	Hong Kong Open	Super 500	(Japan) Kie Nakanishi	(China) Jia Yifan (China) Zhang Shuxian	15–21, 17–21	(silver) Runner-up	
2025	Korea Open	Super 500	(Japan) Kie Nakanishi	(South Korea) Kim Hye-jeong (South Korea) Kong Hee-yong	19–21, 12–21	(silver) Runner-up	
2025	Arctic Open	Super 500	(Japan) Kie Nakanishi	(Malaysia) Pearly Tan (Malaysia) Thinaah Muralitharan	7–21, 9–21	(silver) Runner-up	
2025	Japan Masters	Super 500	(Japan) Kie Nakanishi	(Malaysia) Pearly Tan (Malaysia) Thinaah Muralitharan	20–22, 19–21	(silver) Runner-up	
2026	Thailand Open	Super 500	(Japan) Kie Nakanishi	(China) Bao Lijing (China) Cao Zihan	21–19, 16–21, 19–21	(silver) Runner-up	
2026	Japan Masters	Super 500	(Japan) Kie Nakanishi	(Japan) Ririna Hiramoto (Japan) Chiharu Shida	21–19, 21–15	(gold) Winner	

=== BWF International Challenge/Series (3 titles) ===
Women's doubles
Year	Tournament	Partner	Opponent	Score	Result	Ref.
2019	South Australia International	(Japan) Kie Nakanishi	(Australia) Setyana Mapasa (Australia) Gronya Somerville	21–15, 19–21, 21–9	(gold) Winner	
2019	Dubai International	(Japan) Kie Nakanishi	(Denmark) Alexandra Bøje (Denmark) Mette Poulsen	18–21, 21–15, 21–17	(gold) Winner	
2021	Belgian International	(Japan) Kie Nakanishi	(Scotland) Julie MacPherson (Scotland) Ciara Torrance	21–12, 21–15	(gold) Winner	

BWF International Challenge tournament

=== BWF Junior International (3 runners-up) ===
Girls' doubles
Year	Tournament	Partner	Opponent	Score	Result	Ref.
2017	German Junior	(Japan) Natsu Saito	(South Korea) Kim Min-ji (South Korea) Seong Ah-yeong	16–21, 14–21	(silver) Runner-up	

Mixed doubles
Year	Tournament	Partner	Opponent	Score	Result	Ref.
2017	Dutch Junior	(Japan) Yunosuke Kubota	(South Korea) Na Sung-seung (South Korea) Seong Ah-yeong	21–19, 19–21, 14–21	(silver) Runner-up	
2017	German Junior	(Japan) Yunosuke Kubota	(Malaysia) Chang Yee Jun (Malaysia) Pearly Tan	16–21, 16–21	(silver) Runner-up	

BWF Junior International Grand Prix tournament
