= 2023 BWF World Championships =

2023 Badminton tournament in Denmark

Tournament details
- Dates: 21–27 August
- Edition: 28th
- Level: International
- Competitors: 363 from 54 nations
- Venue: Royal Arena
- Location: Copenhagen, Denmark
- Official website: https://denmark2023.dk/

The 2023 BWF World Championships (officially known as the TotalEnergies BWF World Championships 2023 for sponsorship reasons) was a badminton tournament which took place from 21 to 27 August 2023 in Royal Arena, Copenhagen, Denmark. Copenhagen hosted the BWF World Championships for the fifth time.

== Host city selection ==
Copenhagen was awarded the event in November 2018 during the announcement of 18 major badminton event hosts from 2019 to 2025.

== Competition schedule ==
The tournament holds over a 7-day period.

#R	Preliminary rounds	QF	Quarter-finals	SF	Semi-finals	F	Finals

Date	21 Aug	22 Aug	23 Aug	24 Aug	25 Aug	26 Aug	27 Aug
Event	21 Aug	22 Aug	23 Aug	24 Aug	25 Aug	26 Aug	27 Aug
Men's singles	1R	2R		3R	QF	SF	F
Women's singles	1R		2R	3R	QF	SF	F
Men's doubles	1R		2R	3R	QF	SF	F
Women's doubles	1R		2R	3R	QF	SF	F
Mixed doubles	1R		2R	3R	QF	SF	F

== Point distribution ==
Below is the tables with the point distribution for each phase of the tournament based on the BWF points system for the World Championships event.

Winner	Runner-up	3/4	5/8	9/16	17/32	33/64
13,000	11,000	9,200	7,200	5,200	3,200	1,300

== Medal summary ==
=== Medal table ===
* Host nation (Denmark)

2023 BWF World Championships medal table
Rank	Nation	Gold	Silver	Bronze	Total
1	South Korea	3	0	1	4
2	China	1	1	4	6
3	Thailand	1	0	0	1
4	Japan	0	1	2	3
5	Denmark*	0	1	1	2
6	Indonesia	0	1	0	1
6	Spain	0	1	0	1
8	India	0	0	1	1
8	Malaysia	0	0	1	1
Totals (9 entries)		5	5	10	20

=== Medalists ===
Events	Gold	Silver	Bronze
Men's singles	Kunlavut Vitidsarn; Thailand	Kodai Naraoka; Japan	Prannoy H. S. India
Men's singles	Kunlavut Vitidsarn; Thailand	Kodai Naraoka; Japan	Anders Antonsen; Denmark
Women's singles	An Se-young; South Korea	Carolina Marín; Spain	Chen Yufei; China
Women's singles	An Se-young; South Korea	Carolina Marín; Spain	Akane Yamaguchi; Japan
Men's doubles	South Korea; Kang Min-hyuk; Seo Seung-jae	Denmark; Kim Astrup; Anders Skaarup Rasmussen	Malaysia; Aaron Chia; Soh Wooi Yik
Men's doubles	South Korea; Kang Min-hyuk; Seo Seung-jae	Denmark; Kim Astrup; Anders Skaarup Rasmussen	China; Liang Weikeng; Wang Chang
Women's doubles	China; Chen Qingchen; Jia Yifan	Indonesia; Apriyani Rahayu; Siti Fadia Silva Ramadhanti	China; Zhang Shuxian; Zheng Yu
Women's doubles	China; Chen Qingchen; Jia Yifan	Indonesia; Apriyani Rahayu; Siti Fadia Silva Ramadhanti	South Korea; Kim So-yeong; Kong Hee-yong
Mixed doubles	South Korea; Seo Seung-jae; Chae Yoo-jung	China; Zheng Siwei; Huang Yaqiong	China; Jiang Zhenbang; Wei Yaxin
Mixed doubles	South Korea; Seo Seung-jae; Chae Yoo-jung	China; Zheng Siwei; Huang Yaqiong	Japan; Yuta Watanabe; Arisa Higashino

== Qualifiers ==
=== Number of participants ===
Nation		MS	WS	MD	WD	XD	Total	Number of players
Africa	Egypt	1	1			1	3	2
Africa	Mauritius	1			1		2	3
Africa	Nigeria	1					1	1
Africa	South Africa			1	1		2	4
Asia	China	4	4	4	3	3	18	28
Asia	Chinese Taipei	2	3	3	3	2	13	19
Asia	Hong Kong	2			2	2	6	10
Asia	India	3	1	1	2	2	9	14
Asia	Indonesia	2	2	4	3	3	14	24
Asia	Japan	3	2	2	4	4	15	25
Asia	Jordan	1					1	1
Asia	Kazakhstan	1					1	1
Asia	Malaysia	2	2	3	3	3	13	22
Asia	Maldives				1	1	2	3
Asia	Myanmar		1				1	1
Asia	Philippines			1		1	2	3
Asia	Singapore	2	2	1	1	1	7	10
Asia	South Korea	1	2	1	2	2	8	12
Asia	Thailand	2	3	2	1	2	10	14
Asia	Vietnam	1	1				2	2
Europe	Austria	1			1	1	3	5
Europe	Azerbaijan	1		1			2	2
Europe	Belgium	1	1				2	2
Europe	Bulgaria			1	1	1	3	5
Europe	Czech Republic	1		1			2	3
Europe	Denmark (H)	3	3	2	1	2	11	16
Europe	England			2	2	2	6	11
Europe	Estonia		1		1		2	3
Europe	Finland	1					1	1
Europe	France	2	1	2	1	1	7	9
Europe	Germany	2	1	2	2	2	9	12
Europe	Hungary		1				1	1
Europe	Ireland	1	1	1			3	4
Europe	Israel	1				1	2	2
Europe	Italy	2		1			3	4
Europe	Netherlands	2			2	2	6	9
Europe	Norway			1			1	2
Europe	Portugal	1					1	1
Europe	Scotland		1	2	1	1	5	7
Europe	Serbia					1	1	2
Europe	Slovakia	1					1	1
Europe	Spain	2	2				4	4
Europe	Sweden				1		1	2
Europe	Switzerland	1	1				2	2
Europe	Turkey		1				1	1
Europe	Ukraine	1	1		1		3	4
Oceania	Australia	1	1	1	1	1	5	6
Pan Am	Brazil	2	1	1	1	2	7	9
Pan Am	Canada	2	2	2	1	2	9	11
Pan Am	El Salvador	1					1	1
Pan Am	Guatemala	1		1		1	3	4
Pan Am	Mexico	1	1	1			3	3
Pan Am	Peru		1	1	1		3	4
Pan Am	United States	2	2	1	2	1	8	11
Total (54 NOCs)		63	47	47	47	48	252	363

=== Players participating in two events ===
Player	Gender	Singles	Doubles	Mixed
(Australia) Kenneth Choo	Men		Yes	Yes
(Australia) Gronya Somerville	Women		Yes	Yes
(Azerbaijan) Ade Resky Dwicahyo	Men	Yes	Yes	
(Brazil) Fabrício Farias	Men		Yes	Yes
(Brazil) Jaqueline Lima	Women		Yes	Yes
(Bulgaria) Iliyan Stoynov	Men		Yes	Yes
(Canada) Ty Alexander Lindeman	Men		Yes	Yes
(Canada) Josephine Wu	Women		Yes	Yes
(Canada) Nyl Yakura	Men		Yes	Yes
(Chinese Taipei) Lee Chia-hsin	Women		Yes	Yes
(Chinese Taipei) Yang Po-hsuan	Men		Yes	Yes
(Egypt) Adham Hatem Elgamal	Men	Yes		Yes
(Egypt) Doha Hany	Women	Yes		Yes
(England) Lauren Smith	Women		Yes	Yes
(France) Christo Popov	Men	Yes	Yes	
(France) Toma Junior Popov	Men	Yes	Yes	
(Germany) Linda Efler	Women		Yes	Yes
(Germany) Mark Lamsfuß	Men		Yes	Yes
(Germany) Isabel Lohau	Women		Yes	Yes
(Guatemala) Jonathan Solís	Men		Yes	Yes
(Israel) Misha Zilberman	Men	Yes		Yes
(Maldives) Fathimath Nabaaha Abdul Razzaq	Women		Yes	Yes
(Mexico) Job Castillo	Men	Yes	Yes	
(Netherlands) Debora Jille	Women		Yes	Yes
(Peru) Inés Castillo	Women	Yes	Yes	
(Philippines) Alvin Morada	Men		Yes	Yes
(Scotland) Adam Hall	Men		Yes	Yes
(Scotland) Julie MacPherson	Women		Yes	Yes
(Thailand) Supak Jomkoh	Men		Yes	Yes
(South Korea) Seo Seung-jae	Men		Yes	Yes
(United States) Vinson Chiu	Men		Yes	Yes

== Performance by nation ==
As of the results of 26 August 2023.

Nation	Quota	First round	Second round	Third round	Quarter- finals	Semi- finals	Finals	Champion
South Korea	8	2	8	6	5	4	3	3
China	18	5	17	15	9	6	2	1
Thailand	10	4	10	7	3	1	1	1
Japan	15	7	13	11	7	3	1	
Denmark	11	8	10	5	4	2	1	
Indonesia	14	6	13	9	4	1	1	
Spain	4	3	1	1	1	1	1	
Malaysia	13	8	12	7	3	1		
India	9	6	5	4	2	1		
Chinese Taipei	13	9	13	7	2			
Hong Kong	6	6	5	3				
United States	8	7	5	1				
Singapore	7	7	5	1				
France	7	6	5	1				
Netherlands	6	5	3	1				
Myanmar	1	1	1	1				
Germany	9	9	4					
Canada	9	8	4					
Scotland	5	5	4					
Brazil	7	7	3					
England	6	6	3					
Bulgaria	3	2	2					
Australia	5	5	1					
Austria	3	3	1					
Ireland	3	3	1					
Italy	3	3	1					
Ukraine	3	2	1					
Azerbaijan	2	2	1					
Belgium	2	2	1					
Czech Republic	2	2	1					
Israel	2	2	1					
Philippines	2	2	1					
El Salvador	1	1	1					
Turkey	1	1	1					
Egypt	3	3						
Guatemala	3	3						
Mexico	3	3						
Peru	3	3						
Estonia	2	2						
Maldives	2	2						
Mauritius	2	2						
South Africa	2	2						
Switzerland	2	2						
Vietnam	2	2						
Finland	1	1						
Hungary	1	1						
Jordan	1	1						
Kazakhstan	1	1						
Nigeria	1	1						
Norway	1	1						
Portugal	1	1						
Serbia	1	1						
Slovakia	1	1						
Sweden	1	1						
Withdrew	4	2	2					
Total	256	192	160	80	40	20	10	5
