= Kie Nakanishi =

Japanese badminton player (born 1995)

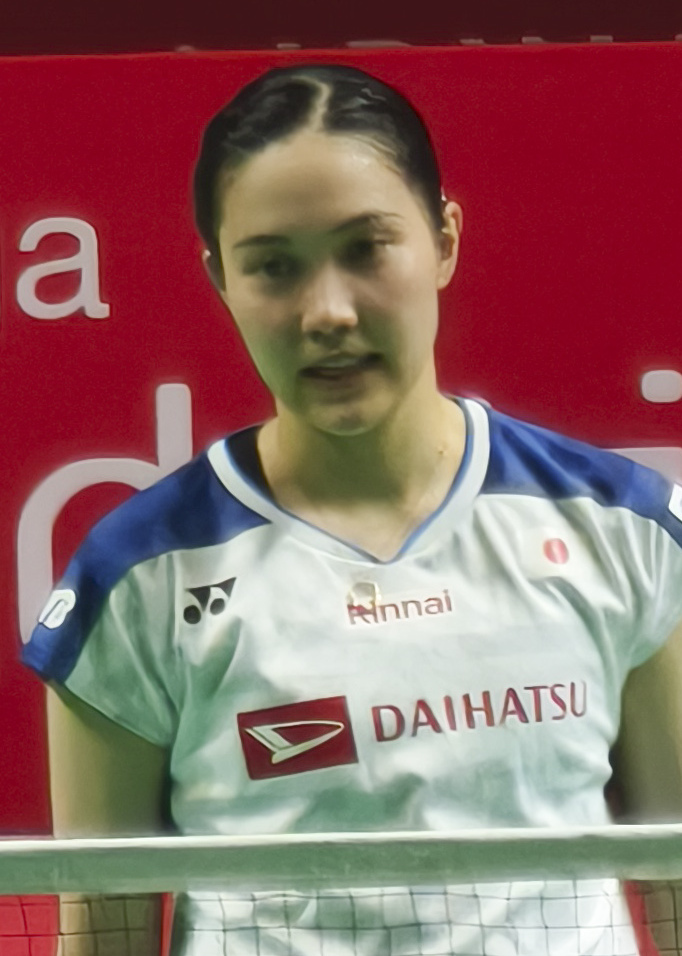
- Nakanishi at the 2026 Indonesia Open

Personal information
- Born: 24 December 1995 (age 30) Sagamihara, Kanagawa, Japan
- Height: 1.70 m (5 ft 7 in)

Sport
- Country: Japan
- Sport: Badminton
- Handedness: Left
- Coached by: Kei Nakashima

Women's doubles
- Highest ranking: 4 (with Rin Iwanaga, 11 March 2025)
- Current ranking: 5 (with Rin Iwanaga, 20 October 2026)
- BWF profile
Medal record
Women's badminton
Representing Japan
World Championships
Bronze medal – third place	2025 Paris	Women's doubles
Sudirman Cup
Bronze medal – third place	2025 Xiamen	Mixed team
Uber Cup
Bronze medal – third place	2026 Horsens	Women's team
Asian Games
Silver medal – second place	2026 Aichi–Nagoya	Women's team
Bronze medal – third place	2026 Aichi–Nagoya	Women's doubles
Asian Championships
Silver medal – second place	2022 Manila	Women's doubles
Asia Mixed Team Championships
Bronze medal – third place	2025 Qingdao	Mixed team
Asia Team Championships
Bronze medal – third place	2024 Selangor	Women's team

Kie Nakanishi (中西 貴映, Nakanishi Kie; born 24 December 1995) is a Japanese badminton player affiliated with the BIPROGY team. She and her partner Rin Iwanaga won the silver medal at the 2022 Asian Championships and a bronze medal at the 2025 World Championships. The pair have won numerous BWF World Tour titles, including their first Super 750 title at the 2024 Denmark Open. The duo reached a career-high ranking of world number 4 on 11 March 2025.

== Early career ==
Nakanishi began playing badminton in elementary school and won prefectural tournaments during her junior high years. At Omiya Higashi High School, she began to specialize in doubles. In 2012, she partnered with her senior Nozomi Okuhara to win the National Sports Festival junior women's doubles title.

After high school, Nakanishi attended Waseda University, where she studied in the Faculty of Sport Sciences and later captained the badminton team. In 2017, she won the women's singles title at the All Japan Student Championships (Inter-Collegiate) and the mixed doubles title at the All Japan Student Mixed Doubles Tournament with Minoru Koga. That same year, she won the Japan Ranking Circuit in mixed doubles with Yuki Kaneko. For these collegiate achievements, she received the Azusa Ono Memorial Sports Award and the Sports Honorary Award. Nakanishi graduated from Waseda in March 2018 and began her professional career the following month by joining the Nihon Unisys team, now known as BIPROGY.

== Career ==
=== 2018–2020 ===
In 2018, Nakanishi partnered with Chisato Hoshi to win her first international title at the Austrian International, followed by her first BWF World Tour title at the Super 100 Russian Open. Additionally, she partnered with Arisa Higashino to reach the semifinals of the New Zealand Open and finished as a runner-up at the All Japan Members Championships.

In 2019, Nakanishi established a new, long-term women's doubles partnership with Rin Iwanaga. The duo claimed titles at the South Australia International and the Dubai International, and finished as runners-up at the Dutch Open. The pair's 2020 season was severely restricted by the COVID-19 pandemic. Competing only in domestic tournaments, they reached the quarterfinals at the All Japan Championships.

=== 2021 ===
In 2021, Nakanishi and Iwanaga reached their first Super 500 final at the Hylo Open, finishing as runners-up to compatriots Chisato Hoshi and Aoi Matsuda. Earlier that year, the pair won the Belgian International. They also competed in the Indonesia Masters and the Indonesia Open at the Indonesia Badminton Festival in Bali but were eliminated in the early rounds of both tournaments. In December, they made their World Championship debut held in Huelva, reaching the quarterfinals. By the end of the year, they entered the top 30 world rankings, reaching world No. 26.

=== 2022 ===
Nakanishi and Iwanaga won a silver medal at the Asian Championships in Manila, losing to the then-World No. 1 pair Chen Qingchen and Jia Yifan of China. In August, they participated in the World Championships in Tokyo, where they were eliminated in the third round. Throughout their 2022 World Tour campaign, Nakanishi and Iwanaga lost in the early rounds of each tournament they entered. They reached a new career-high ranking of world No. 15 as of 24 October.

=== 2023 ===
In 2023, Nakanishi and Iwanaga won their first BWF World Tour title at the Super 300 Syed Modi International. They also reached the semifinals of the Arctic Open and the Denmark Open. At the Denmark Open, they defeated two Chinese pairs—Liu Shengshu and Tan Ning, and Zhang Shuxian and Zheng Yu—before losing to Chen Qingchen and Jia Yifan. Additionally, they reached the quarterfinals in five other tournaments: the India Open, the Thailand Open, the Singapore Open, the Korea Open, and the Australia Open.

=== 2024 ===
Nakanishi and Iwanaga began the year by reaching their first Super 1000 quarterfinal at the Malaysia Open, defeating third seeds Kim So-yeong and Kong Hee-yong. Later in the season, they won five consecutive titles, which included their first Super 750 title at the Denmark Open. This undefeated run in finals also included victories at the Spain Masters, Malaysia Masters, U.S. Open, and Canada Open. En route to the Denmark Open title, they defeated Baek Ha-na and Lee So-hee in the semifinals, achieving their first win against that pair. In the final, they beat the Paris 2024 Olympic silver medalists and then-world No. 1 pair Liu Shengshu and Tan Ning. They competed in the BWF World Tour Finals but were eliminated in the round-robin stage. They reached a new career-high ranking of world No. 5 as of 4 November.

=== 2025 ===
Nakanishi's 2025 season began while her partner Iwanaga was recovering from injuries sustained in late 2024. The pair won the bronze medal at the World Championships in Paris, losing in the semifinals to the eventual gold medalists Liu Shengshu and Tan Ning. On the BWF World Tour, the duo reached three finals, finishing as runners-up at the Super 750 Singapore Open, Super 500 Hong Kong Open, and Super 500 Korea Open. They also reached the quarterfinals at the All England Open, the Asian Championships, and the Indonesia Open. Nakanishi and Iwanaga achieved a new career-high ranking of World No. 4 on 11 March. In team competitions, Nakanishi contributed to Japan's bronze medal finishes at the Asia Mixed Team Championships and the Sudirman Cup.

=== 2026 ===
In 2026, Nakanishi and Iwanaga reached the final of the Super 500 Thailand Open, finishing as runners-up to Bao Lijing and Cao Zihan. Nakanishi won a bronze medal as part of the Japanese women's team at the Uber Cup in Horsens. At the 2026 Asian Games in Aichi–Nagoya, she won silver in the women's team event, sealing Japan's 3–1 semi-final victory over South Korea. In women's doubles, she won bronze after defeating fourth seeds Jia Yifan and Zhang Shuxian, before losing in the semi-finals to eventual champions Baek Ha-na and Lee So-hee.

== Achievements ==
=== World Championships ===
Women's doubles
Year	Venue	Partner	Opponent	Score	Result	Ref.
2025	Adidas Arena; Paris, France	(Japan) Rin Iwanaga	(China) Liu Shengshu (China) Tan Ning	15–21, 4–21	Bronze	

=== Asian Games ===
Women's doubles
Year	Venue	Partner	Opponent	Score	Result	Ref.
2026	Ichinomiya City Municipal Gymnasium; Ichinomiya, Japan	(Japan) Rin Iwanaga	(South Korea) Baek Ha-na (South Korea) Lee So-hee	13–21, 12–21	Bronze	

=== Asian Championships ===
Women's doubles
Year	Venue	Partner	Opponent	Score	Result	Ref.
2022	Muntinlupa Sports Complex; Metro Manila, Philippines	(Japan) Rin Iwanaga	(China) Chen Qingchen (China) Jia Yifan	11–21, 15–21	Silver	

=== BWF World Tour (8 titles, 8 runners-up) ===
The BWF World Tour, which was announced on 19 March 2017 and implemented in 2018, is a series of elite badminton tournaments sanctioned by the Badminton World Federation (BWF). The BWF World Tour is divided into levels of World Tour Finals, Super 1000, Super 750, Super 500, Super 300 (part of the HSBC World Tour), and the BWF Tour Super 100.

Women's doubles
Year	Tournament	Level	Partner	Opponent	Score	Result	Ref.
2018	Russian Open	Super 100	(Japan) Chisato Hoshi	(Malaysia) Chow Mei Kuan (Malaysia) Lee Meng Yean	21–11, 21–18	(gold) Winner	
2019	Dutch Open	Super 100	(Japan) Rin Iwanaga	(Bulgaria) Gabriela Stoeva (Bulgaria) Stefani Stoeva	10–21, 20–22	(silver) Runner-up	
2021	Hylo Open	Super 500	(Japan) Rin Iwanaga	(Japan) Chisato Hoshi (Japan) Aoi Matsuda	20–22, 18–21	(silver) Runner-up	
2023	Syed Modi International	Super 300	(Japan) Rin Iwanaga	(India) Tanisha Crasto (India) Ashwini Ponnappa	21–14, 17–21, 21–15	(gold) Winner	
2024	Spain Masters	Super 300	(Japan) Rin Iwanaga	(Indonesia) Febriana Dwipuji Kusuma (Indonesia) Amallia Cahaya Pratiwi	12–21, 21–8, 21–16	(gold) Winner	
2024	Malaysia Masters	Super 500	(Japan) Rin Iwanaga	(South Korea) Lee Yu-lim (South Korea) Shin Seung-chan	17–21, 21–19, 21–18	(gold) Winner	
2024	U.S. Open	Super 300	(Japan) Rin Iwanaga	(Thailand) Laksika Kanlaha (Thailand) Phataimas Muenwong	21–19, 21–15	(gold) Winner	
2024	Canada Open	Super 500	(Japan) Rin Iwanaga	(Chinese Taipei) Hsu Yin-hui (Chinese Taipei) Lin Jhih-yun	21–13, 21–13	(gold) Winner	
2024	Denmark Open	Super 750	(Japan) Rin Iwanaga	(China) Liu Shengshu (China) Tan Ning	21–18, 21–14	(gold) Winner	
2025	Singapore Open	Super 750	(Japan) Rin Iwanaga	(South Korea) Kim Hye-jeong (South Korea) Kong Hee-yong	16–21, 14–21	(silver) Runner-up	
2025	Hong Kong Open	Super 500	(Japan) Rin Iwanaga	(China) Jia Yifan (China) Zhang Shuxian	15–21, 17–21	(silver) Runner-up	
2025	Korea Open	Super 500	(Japan) Rin Iwanaga	(South Korea) Kim Hye-jeong (South Korea) Kong Hee-yong	19–21, 12–21	(silver) Runner-up	
2025	Arctic Open	Super 500	(Japan) Rin Iwanaga	(Malaysia) Pearly Tan (Malaysia) Thinaah Muralitharan	7–21, 9–21	(silver) Runner-up	
2025	Japan Masters	Super 500	(Japan) Rin Iwanaga	(Malaysia) Pearly Tan (Malaysia) Thinaah Muralitharan	20–22, 19–21	(silver) Runner-up	
2026	Thailand Open	Super 500	(Japan) Rin Iwanaga	(China) Bao Lijing (China) Cao Zihan	21–19, 16–21, 19–21	(silver) Runner-up	
2026	Japan Masters	Super 500	(Japan) Rin Iwanaga	(Japan) Ririna Hiramoto (Japan) Chiharu Shida	21–19, 21–15	(gold) Winner	

=== BWF International Challenge/Series (4 titles) ===
Women's doubles
Year	Tournament	Partner	Opponent	Score	Result	Ref.
2018	Austrian International	(Japan) Chisato Hoshi	(Japan) Sayaka Hobara (Japan) Natsuki Sone	21–15, 21–18	(gold) Winner	
2019	South Australia International	(Japan) Rin Iwanaga	(Australia) Setyana Mapasa (Australia) Gronya Somerville	21–15, 19–21, 21–9	(gold) Winner	
2019	Dubai International	(Japan) Rin Iwanaga	(Denmark) Alexandra Bøje (Denmark) Mette Poulsen	18–21, 21–15, 21–17	(gold) Winner	
2021	Belgian International	(Japan) Rin Iwanaga	(Scotland) Julie MacPherson (Scotland) Ciara Torrance	21–12, 21–15	(gold) Winner	

BWF International Challenge tournament
