= BWF World Championships =

Badminton tournament

- Current season, competition or edition: 2026 BWF World Championships
- Formerly: IBF World Championships
- Sport: Badminton
- Founded: 1977; 49 years ago
- Country: BWF member nations

The BWF World Championships is a badminton tournament organized by the Badminton World Federation. It's the most prestigious badminton competition, offering the most ranking points, along with the Summer Olympics badminton events introduced in 1992. The winners of the tournament are World Champions of the sport and are awarded a gold medal.

The tournament started in 1977 and was held once every three years until 1983. However, the International Badminton Federation faced difficulty in hosting the first two events as the World Badminton Federation, which later merged with the IBF to form one badminton federation, hosted the same tournament a year after the IBF World Championships with the same goals.

Since 1985, the tournament became biennial and played once every two years until 2005. Starting 2006, the tournament was changed to an annual event on the BWF calendar, except during Summer Olympic years.

== Editions ==
Year	Edition	Host city	Host country	Dates	Top Nation
1977	I	Malmö (1)	Sweden (1)	3–8 May	Denmark (1)
1980	II	Jakarta (1)	Indonesia (1)	27 May – 1 June	Indonesia (1)
1983	III	Copenhagen (1)	Denmark (1)	2–8 May	China (1)
1985	IV	Calgary (1)	Canada (1)	10–16 June	China (2)
1987	V	Beijing (1)	China (1)	18–24 May	China (3)
1989	VI	Jakarta (2)	Indonesia (2)	29 May – 4 June	China (4)
1991	VII	Copenhagen (2)	Denmark (2)	2–8 May	China (5)
1993	VIII	Birmingham (1)	England (1)	31 May – 6 June	Indonesia (2)
1995	IX	Lausanne (1)	Switzerland (1)	22–28 May	Indonesia (3)
1997	X	Glasgow (1)	Scotland (1)	24 May – 1 June	China (6)
1999	XI	Copenhagen (3)	Denmark (3)	16–23 May	South Korea (1)
2001	XII	Seville (1)	Spain (1)	3–10 June	China (7)
2003	XIII	Birmingham (2)	England (2)	28 July – 3 August	China (8)
2005	XIV	Anaheim (1)	United States (1)	15–21 August	China (9)
2006	XV	Madrid (1)	Spain (2)	18–24 September	China (10)
2007	XVI	Kuala Lumpur (1)	Malaysia (1)	13–19 August	China (11)
2009	XVII	Hyderabad (1)	India (1)	10–16 August	China (12)
2010	XVIII	Paris (1)	France (1)	23–29 August	China (13)
2011	XIX	London (1)	England (3)	8–14 August	China (14)
2013	XX	Guangzhou (1)	China (2)	5–11 August	China (15)
2014	XXI	Copenhagen (4)	Denmark (4)	25–31 August	China (16)
2015	XXII	Jakarta (3)	Indonesia (3)	10–16 August	China (17)
2017	XXIII	Glasgow (2)	Scotland (2)	21–27 August	China (18)
2018	XXIV	Nanjing (1)	China (3)	30 July – 5 August	China (19)
2019	XXV	Basel (1)	Switzerland (2)	19–25 August	Japan (1)
2021	XXVI	Huelva (1)	Spain (3)	12–19 December	Japan (2)
2022	XXVII	Tokyo (1)	Japan (1)	22–28 August	China (20)
2023	XXVIII	Copenhagen (5)	Denmark (5)	21–27 August	South Korea (2)
2025	XXIX	Paris (2)	France (2)	25–31 August	China (21)
2026	XXX	New Delhi (1)	India (2)	17–23 August	South Korea (3)

== Venues ==
The table below gives an overview of all host cities and countries of the World Championships. The most recent games were held in Copenhagen. The number in parentheses following the city/country denotes how many times that city/country has hosted the championships. From 1989 to 2001 the world championships were held immediately after the Sudirman Cup at the same location.

Host cities of the World Championships (Asia)
Host cities of the World Championships (Europe)
Host cities of the World Championships (North America)

== Winners summary ==
As of 2025, only 22 countries have achieved at least a bronze medal in the tournament: 11 from Asia, eight from Europe, two from North America and one from Oceania. Africa is the only confederation that has not won a medal. Canada is the newest country to win a medal in 2025.

At the age of 18, Ratchanok Inthanon became the youngest winner of a singles title at the Championships. Ratchanok was less than 3 months older than Jang Hye-ock was when she won the women's doubles title at the 1995 Championships.

=== Most successful players ===
Several players have won gold medals in more than one category in a World Championship; this includes:

- (Denmark) Lene Køppen, 1977, mixed doubles and women's singles
- (Indonesia) Christian Hadinata, 1980, men's doubles and mixed doubles
- (South Korea) Park Joo-bong, 1985 & 1991, men's doubles and mixed doubles
- (China) Han Aiping, 1985, women's singles and doubles
- (China) Ge Fei, 1997, women's doubles and mixed doubles
- (South Korea) Kim Dong-moon, 1999, men's doubles and mixed doubles
- (China) Gao Ling, 2001, women's doubles and mixed doubles
- (China) Zhao Yunlei, 2014 & 2015, women's doubles and mixed doubles
- (South Korea) Seo Seung-jae, 2023, men's doubles and mixed doubles

From 1977 up to 2001, the medals were usually divided among five countries, namely China, Korea, Denmark, Indonesia, Malaysia. However, in 2003, the winners included seven countries and in 2005 and 2025 the medal board contained a record high of ten countries.

Tony Gunawan also bears the distinction of winning a gold medal in Men's Doubles, representing two countries, 2001 partnering with Halim Haryanto for Indonesia and in 2005 partnering with Howard Bach to give the United States its first medal in the competition.

The 2005 edition also brought new faces to the mixed doubles event which had been dominated by China and Korea since 1997. With the retirement of defending champions and two-time winners Kim Dong-moon/Ra Kyung-min (Korea), Nova Widianto/Liliyana Natsir won Indonesia's first mixed doubles gold since 1980 when Christian Hadinata/Imelda Wiguna won it last for Indonesia.

Below is the list of the most successful players ever, with 3 or more gold medals.

Rank	Player	MS	WS	MD	WD	XD	Total
1	(China) Lin Dan	5					5
1	(China) Zhao Yunlei				2	3	5
1	(South Korea) Park Joo-bong			2		3	5
4	(China) Cai Yun			4			4
4	(China) Chen Qingchen				4		4
4	(China) Fu Haifeng			4			4
4	(China) Gao Ling				3	1	4
4	(China) Jia Yifan				4		4
4	(China) Zhang Nan			1		3	4
4	(Indonesia) Liliyana Natsir					4	4
4	(Indonesia) Hendra Setiawan			4			4
12	(China) Ge Fei				2	1	3
12	(China) Guan Weizhen				3		3
12	(China) Han Aiping		2		1		3
12	(China) Huang Sui				3		3
12	(China) Huang Yaqiong					3	3
12	(China) Li Lingwei		2		1		3
12	(China) Lin Ying				3		3
12	(China) Yu Yang				3		3
12	(China) Zheng Siwei					3	3
12	(Indonesia) Mohammad Ahsan			3			3
12	(Japan) Akane Yamaguchi		3				3
12	(South Korea) Kim Dong-moon			1		2	3
12	(South Korea) Seo Seung-jae			2		1	3
12	(Spain) Carolina Marín		3				3

Below is the list of the most successful player(s) in each category (listed according to their last title):

Category	Player	Total	Year
MS	(China) Lin Dan	5	2006, 2007, 2009, 2011, 2013
WS	(Japan) Akane Yamaguchi	3	2021, 2022, 2025
WS	(Spain) Carolina Marín	3	2014, 2015, 2018
MD	(China) Cai Yun	4	2006, 2009, 2010, 2011 (with Fu Haifeng)
MD	(China) Fu Haifeng	4	2006, 2009, 2010, 2011 (with Cai Yun)
MD	(Indonesia) Hendra Setiawan	4	2007 (with Markis Kido), 2013, 2015, 2019 (with Mohammad Ahsan)
WD	(China) Chen Qingchen	4	2017, 2021, 2022, 2023 (with Jia Yifan)
WD	(China) Jia Yifan	4	2017, 2021, 2022, 2023 (with Chen Qingchen)
XD	(Indonesia) Liliyana Natsir	4	2005, 2007 (with Nova Widianto), 2013, 2017 (with Tontowi Ahmad)

MS: Men's singles; WS: Women's singles; MD: Men's doubles; WD: Women's doubles; XD: Mixed doubles

=== National teams ===
==== Most titles ====
China have been the most successful country in the World Championships since its inception in 1977. They have won the tournament 21 times. The first time was in 1983 at their debut.

==== Most gold medal sweeps ====
China have taken all five gold medals at three occasions: 1987, 2010 and 2011. They are the only ones to have done so at any single championship.

==== Nation gold medals and tournament wins ====
Below is the gold medalists shown based by category and countries as of 2026 BWF World Championships. Ranking by total number of gold medals. Two shared gold medals count as one in total. BOLD means winner of championship.

Half a medal comes from two player from each own nation playing a double, which is allowed in individual tournaments under BWF. As late as 2026 Aline Müller from Schwitzerland and Kelly van Buiten from the Netherlands played a womens double together.

Rank	Nation	Gold medals by year																														Total gold	Tournaments won
Rank	Nation	77	80	83	85	87	89	91	93	95	97	99	01	03	05	06	07	09	10	11	13	14	15	17	18	19	21	22	23	25	26	Total gold	Tournaments won
1	China			**2**	**3**	**5**	**4**	**3**	1	1	**3**	2^{1}	**3**	**3**	**2**^{2}	**4**	**3**	**4**	**5**	**5**	**2**^{3}	**3**	**3**	**2**	**2**^{4}	1	1	**2**	1	**2**	1	73	21
2	Indonesia	1	**4**	1					**3**	**2**	1		2		2^{2}		2				2^{3}		1	1		1						23	3
3	South Korea				2		1	2		1		**2**^{1}		1								1							**3**	1	**2**^{5}	16	3
4	Denmark	**3**		1					0.5	1	1	1		1				1						1				1				11.5	1
5	Japan	1																						1	2^{4}	**2**	**2**	1		1		10	2
6	Spain																					1	1		1							3	0
6	Thailand																				1						1		1			3	0
8	England		1	0.5												1																2.5	0
9	France																														2^{5}	2	0
9	Malaysia																											1		1		2	0
11	India																									1						1	0
11	Singapore																										1					1	0
11	Sweden			0.5					0.5																							1	0
11	United States														1																	1	0

^1 Korea won on the superior of two silver medals to China's one and thus Korea became the overall winner.
^2 China won on superior of four silver medals to Indonesia's one and thus China became the overall winner.
^3 China won on the superior of two silver medals to Indonesia's none and thus China became the overall winner.
^4 China won on superior of four bronze medals to Japan's two and thus China became the overall winner.
^5 Korea won on superior of one bronze medal to France's none and thus Korea became the overall winner.

=== Disciplin win per country ===
==== Men's singles ====
Rank	Nation	77	80	83	85	87	89	91	93	95	97	99	01	03	05	06	07	09	10	11	13	14	15	17	18	19	21	22	23	25	26	Total
1	China				X	X	X	X				X		X		X	X	X	X	X	X	X	X							X		15
2	Indonesia		X	X					X	X			X		X																	6
3	Denmark	X									X													X				X				4
4	Japan																								X	X						2
5	France																														X	1
5	Singapore																										X					1
5	Thailand																												X			1

==== Women's singles ====
Rank	Nation	77	80	83	85	87	89	91	93	95	97	99	01	03	05	06	07	09	10	11	13	14	15	17	18	19	21	22	23	25	26	Total
1	China			X	X	X	X	X		X	X		X	X	X	X	X	X	X	X												15
2	Japan																							X			X	X		X		4
3	Spain																					X	X		X							3
4	Denmark	X										X																				2
4	Indonesia		X						X																							2
4	South Korea																												X		X	2
7	India																									X						1
7	Thailand																				X											1

==== Men's doubles ====
Rank	Nation	77	80	83	85	87	89	91	93	95	97	99	01	03	05	06	07	09	10	11	13	14	15	17	18	19	21	22	23	25	26	Total
1	Indonesia	X	X						X	X	X		X				X				X		X			X						10
2	China					X	X									X		X	X	X				X	X						X	9
3	South Korea				X			X				X										X							X	X		6
4	Denmark			X										X																		2
5	Japan																										X					1
5	Malaysia																											X				1
5	United States														X																	1

==== Women's doubles ====
Rank	Nation	77	80	83	85	87	89	91	93	95	97	99	01	03	05	06	07	09	10	11	13	14	15	17	18	19	21	22	23	25	26	Total
1	China			X	X	X	X	X	X		X	X	X	X	X	X	X	X	X	X	X	X	X	X			X	X	X	X		24
2	Japan	X																							X	X						3
3	South Korea									X																					X	2
4	England		X																													1

==== Mixed doubles ====
Rank	Nation	77	80	83	85	87	89	91	93	95	97	99	01	03	05	06	07	09	10	11	13	14	15	17	18	19	21	22	23	25	26	Total
1	China					X					X		X						X	X		X	X		X	X		X				10
2	South Korea				X		X	X				X		X															X			6
3	Indonesia		X												X		X				X			X								5
4	Denmark	X							/	X								X														3.5
5	England			/												X																1.5
6	France																														X	1
6	Malaysia																													X		1
6	Sweden			\					\																							1
6	Thailand																										X					1

== Medal table ==
=== Total medals ===
As of the 2026 edition, does not include one stripped silver medal from 2014

Rank	Nation	Gold	Silver	Bronze	Total
1	China	73	54	87	214
2	Indonesia	23	20	39	82
3	South Korea	16	15	35	66
4	Denmark	11.5	15	43	69.5
5	Japan	10	11	23	44
6	Thailand	3	3	6	12
7	Spain	3	1	0	4
8	England	2.5	8.5	13	24
9	Malaysia	2	10	14	26
10	France	2	0	2	4
11	India	1	4	11	16
12	Sweden	1	2	5	8
13	Singapore	1	0	0	1
13	United States	1	0	0	1
15	Chinese Taipei	0	3	8	11
16	Hong Kong	0	1	3	4
17	Netherlands	0	1	1	2
18	Scotland	0	0.5	1	1.5
19	Germany	0	0	5	5
20	Canada	0	0	2	2
21	New Zealand	0	0	1	1
21	Vietnam	0	0	1	1
Totals (22 entries)		150	149	300	599

=== Medal by discipline ===
==== Men's singles ====
As of the 2026 edition

Due to the disqualification on suspicion of violation of anti-doping regulations, the 2014 silver medalist Lee Chong Wei was stripped of his medal and thus the medal count does not add up.

Rank	Nation	Gold	Silver	Bronze	Total
1	China	15	6	14	35
2	Indonesia	6	7	13	26
3	Denmark	4	5	15	24
4	Japan	2	2	1	5
5	Thailand	1	2	1	4
6	France	1	0	0	1
6	Singapore	1	0	0	1
8	Malaysia	0	4	2	6
9	India	0	1	4	5
9	South Korea	0	1	4	5
11	Chinese Taipei	0	1	2	3
12	Canada	0	0	2	2
13	Sweden	0	0	1	1
13	Vietnam	0	0	1	1
Totals (14 entries)		30	29	60	119

==== Women's singles ====
As of the 2026 edition

Rank	Nation	Gold	Silver	Bronze	Total
1	China	15	17	26	58
2	Japan	4	2	4	10
3	Spain	3	1	0	4
4	Indonesia	2	2	6	10
5	South Korea	2	1	6	9
6	Denmark	2	0	3	5
7	India	1	3	3	7
8	Thailand	1	0	2	3
9	Chinese Taipei	0	2	2	4
10	England	0	1	2	3
11	Hong Kong	0	1	0	1
12	Germany	0	0	4	4
13	France	0	0	1	1
13	Netherlands	0	0	1	1
Totals (14 entries)		30	30	60	120

==== Men's doubles ====
As of the 2026 edition

Rank	Nation	Gold	Silver	Bronze	Total
1	Indonesia	10	6	10	26
2	China	9	5	11	25
3	South Korea	6	6	9	21
4	Denmark	2	4	8	14
5	Malaysia	1	5	11	17
6	Japan	1	2	3	6
7	United States	1	0	0	1
8	England	0	2	2	4
9	Chinese Taipei	0	0	2	2
9	India	0	0	2	2
9	Sweden	0	0	2	2
Totals (11 entries)		30	30	60	120

==== Women's doubles ====
As of the 2026 edition

Rank	Nation	Gold	Silver	Bronze	Total
1	China	24	14	17	55
2	Japan	3	3	12	18
3	South Korea	2	5	12	19
4	England	1	1	3	5
5	Indonesia	0	3	4	7
6	Denmark	0	1	7	8
7	Sweden	0	1	1	2
8	Malaysia	0	1	0	1
8	Netherlands	0	1	0	1
10	India	0	0	2	2
11	Chinese Taipei	0	0	1	1
11	Thailand	0	0	1	1
Totals (12 entries)		30	30	60	120

==== Mixed doubles ====
As of the 2026 edition

Rank	Nation	Gold	Silver	Bronze	Total
1	China	10	12	19	41
2	South Korea	6	2	4	12
3	Indonesia	5	2	6	13
4	Denmark	3.5	5	10	18.5
5	England	1.5	4.5	6	12
6	Thailand	1	1	2	4
7	Sweden	1	1	1	3
8	France	1	0	1	2
8	Malaysia	1	0	1	2
10	Japan	0	2	3	5
11	Scotland	0	0.5	1	1.5
12	Hong Kong	0	0	3	3
13	Chinese Taipei	0	0	1	1
13	Germany	0	0	1	1
13	New Zealand	0	0	1	1
Totals (15 entries)		30	30	60	120

== See also ==
- BWF World Junior Championships
- BWF World Senior Championships
