= 2021 BWF World Championships – Women's doubles =

Badminton championships

Women's doubles at the 2021 BWF World Championships
- Venue: Palacio de los Deportes Carolina Marín
- Location: Huelva, Spain
- Dates: 12–19 December

Medalists
gold medal	Chen Qingchen; Jia Yifan	China
silver medal	Lee So-hee; Shin Seung-chan	South Korea
bronze medal	Mayu Matsumoto; Wakana Nagahara	Japan
bronze medal	Kim So-yeong; Kong Hee-yong	South Korea

The women's doubles tournament of the 2021 BWF World Championships took place from 12 to 19 December 2021 at the Palacio de los Deportes Carolina Marín at Huelva.

== Seeds ==
The seeding list is based on the World Rankings of 23 November 2021.

1. (China) Chen Qingchen / Jia Yifan (champions)
2. (South Korea) Lee So-hee / Shin Seung-chan (final)
3. (South Korea) Kim So-yeong / Kong Hee-yong (semi-finals)
4. (Japan) Mayu Matsumoto / Wakana Nagahara (semi-finals)
5. (Indonesia) Greysia Polii / Apriyani Rahayu (withdrew)
6. (Thailand) Jongkolphan Kititharakul / Rawinda Prajongjai (quarter-finals)
7. (Japan) Nami Matsuyama / Chiharu Shida (quarter-finals)
8. (Bulgaria) Gabriela Stoeva / Stefani Stoeva (quarter-finals)

9. (England) Chloe Birch / Lauren Smith (third round)
10. (China) Li Wenmei / Zheng Yu (third round)
11. (Denmark) Maiken Fruergaard / Sara Thygesen (third round)
12. (Thailand) Puttita Supajirakul / Sapsiree Taerattanachai (third round)
13. (Malaysia) Pearly Tan / Thinaah Muralitharan (second round)
14. (China) Liu Xuanxuan / Xia Yuting (second round)
15. (Canada) Rachel Honderich / Kristen Tsai (third round)
16. (Denmark) Amalie Magelund / Freja Ravn (second round)

== Draw ==
=== Finals ===
Semi-finals
1	(China) Chen Qingchen (China) Jia Yifan	21	21
4	(Japan) Mayu Matsumoto (Japan) Wakana Nagahara	15	12
3	(South Korea) Kim So-yeong (South Korea) Kong Hee-yong	18	17
2	(South Korea) Lee So-hee (South Korea) Shin Seung-chan	21	21

Final
1	(China) Chen Qingchen (China) Jia Yifan	21	21
2	(South Korea) Lee So-hee (South Korea) Shin Seung-chan	16	17

=== Top half ===
==== Section 1 ====
First Round
(India) P Dandu (India) S Santosh	12^{r}
(Netherlands) A Tirtosentono (Netherlands) I van der Aar	21
(Indonesia) S F S Ramadhanti (Indonesia) R Sugiarto
(Spain) C Azurmendi (Spain) B Corrales	w	/	o
(Germany) L Efler (Germany) I Lohau	21	14	12
(Russia) A Akchurina (Russia) O Morozova	19	21	21

Second Round
1	(China) Chen QC (China) Jia YF	21	21
(Peru) I Castillo (Peru) P la Torre Regal	11	4
15	(Canada) R Honderich (Canada) K Tsai	21	21
(Netherlands) A Tirtosentono (Netherlands) I van der Aar	12	5
7	(Japan) N Matsuyama (Japan) C Shida	21	21
(Spain) C Azurmendi (Spain) B Corrales	9	13
12	(Thailand) P Supajirakul (Thailand) S Taerattanachai	21	21
(Russia) A Akchurina (Russia) O Morozova	4	9

Third Round
1	(China) Chen QC (China) Jia YF	21	21
15	(Canada) R Honderich (Canada) K Tsai	11	17
7	(Japan) N Matsuyama (Japan) C Shida	21	21
12	(Thailand) P Supajirakul (Thailand) S Taerattanachai	15	15

Quarter-finals
1	(China) Chen QC (China) Jia YF	21	21
7	(Japan) N Matsuyama (Japan) C Shida	13	17

==== Section 2 ====
First Round
(Sweden) J Magnusson (Sweden) C Nistad	20	17
(Denmark) C Busch (Denmark) A Schulz	22	21
(Estonia) K-K Marran (Estonia) H Rüütel	9	13
(Hong Kong) Ng W Y (Hong Kong) Yeung N T	21	21
(Portugal) A F. Gonçalves (Portugal) S Gonçalves	9	10
(Turkey) B Erçetin (Turkey) N İnci	21	21
(India) K. Maneesha (India) R Panda
(Brazil) J Lima (Brazil) S Lima	w	/	o

Second Round
4	(Japan) M Matsumoto (Japan) W Nagahara	21	21
(Denmark) C Busch (Denmark) A Schulz	12	7
16	(Denmark) A Magelund (Denmark) F Ravn	16	18
(Hong Kong) Ng W Y (Hong Kong) Yeung N T	21	21
8	(Bulgaria) G Stoeva (Bulgaria) S Stoeva	21	21
(Turkey) B Erçetin (Turkey) N İnci	12	14
9	(England) C Birch (England) L Smith	21	21
(Brazil) J Lima (Brazil) S Lima	12	14

Third Round
4	(Japan) M Matsumoto (Japan) W Nagahara	21	21
(Hong Kong) Ng W Y (Hong Kong) Yeung N T	14	14
8	(Bulgaria) G Stoeva (Bulgaria) S Stoeva	21	21
9	(England) C Birch (England) L Smith	10	9

Quarter-finals
4	(Japan) M Matsumoto (Japan) W Nagahara	21	21
8	(Bulgaria) G Stoeva (Bulgaria) S Stoeva	15	17

=== Bottom half ===
==== Section 3 ====
First Round
(Thailand) B Aimsaard (Thailand) N Aimsaard	21	21
(Austria) S Au Yeong (Austria) K Hochmeir	11	8
(Russia) V Kozyreva (Russia) M Sukhova	7	11
(Japan) R Iwanaga (Japan) K Nakanishi	21	21
(Malaysia) Teoh M X (Malaysia) Yap L	18	17
(Denmark) A Bøje (Denmark) M Poulsen	21	21
(Republic of Ireland) K Frost (Republic of Ireland) M Ryan	22	12
(Switzerland) A Müller (Switzerland) J Stadelmann	24	21

Second Round
(Thailand) B Aimsaard (Thailand) N Aimsaard	9	14
10	(China) Li WM (China) Zheng Y	21	21
(Japan) R Iwanaga (Japan) K Nakanishi	w	/	o
5	(Indonesia) G Polii (Indonesia) A Rahayu
(Denmark) A Bøje (Denmark) M Poulsen	21	20	12
11	(Denmark) M Fruergaard (Denmark) S Thygesen	18	22	21
(Switzerland) A Müller (Switzerland) J Stadelmann	11	10
3	(South Korea) Kim S-y (South Korea) Kong H-y	21	21

Third Round
10	(China) Li WM (China) Zheng Y	12	21	18
(Japan) R Iwanaga (Japan) K Nakanishi	21	17	21
11	(Denmark) M Fruergaard (Denmark) S Thygesen	13	19
3	(South Korea) Kim S-y (South Korea) Kong H-y	21	21

Quarter-finals
(Japan) R Iwanaga (Japan) K Nakanishi	8	18
3	(South Korea) Kim S-y (South Korea) Kong H-y	21	21

==== Section 4 ====
First Round
(India) A Ponnappa (India) N. S Reddy	w	/	o
(France) D Delrue (France) L Palermo
(Maldives) A N Abdul Razzaq (Maldives) F N Abdul Razzaq
(Russia) E Malkova (Russia) A Davletova	w	/	o
(Hong Kong) Ng T Y (Hong Kong) Yuen S Y	21	20	21
(Scotland) J MacPherson (Scotland) C Torrance	15	22	12
(Japan) C Hoshi (Japan) A Matsuda	21	21
(Ukraine) A Prozorova (Ukraine) V Rudakova	7	8

Second Round
(India) A Ponnappa (India) N. S Reddy	21	9	21
14	(China) Liu XX (China) Xia YT	11	21	13
(Russia) E Malkova (Russia) A Davletova	16	21	17
6	(Thailand) J Kititharakul (Thailand) R Prajongjai	21	13	21
(Hong Kong) Ng T Y (Hong Kong) Yuen S Y	10	21	21
13	(Malaysia) P Tan (Malaysia) Thinaah M	21	12	11
(Japan) C Hoshi (Japan) A Matsuda	12	13
2	(South Korea) Lee S-h (South Korea) Shin S-c	21	21

Third Round
(India) A Ponnappa (India) N. S Reddy	13	15
6	(Thailand) J Kititharakul (Thailand) R Prajongjai	21	21
(Hong Kong) Ng T Y (Hong Kong) Yuen S Y	17	18
2	(South Korea) Lee S-h (South Korea) Shin S-c	21	21

Quarter-finals
6	(Thailand) J Kititharakul (Thailand) R Prajongjai	21	18	18
2	(South Korea) Lee S-h (South Korea) Shin S-c	19	21	21
