= 2018 BWF World Championships =

Tournament details
- Dates: 30 July – 5 August
- Edition: 24th
- Level: International
- Competitors: 357 from 48 nations
- Venue: Nanjing Youth Olympic Games Sports Park Arena
- Location: Nanjing, China

The 2018 BWF World Championships was a badminton tournament which was held from 30 July to 5 August at Nanjing Youth Olympic Games Sports Park Arena in Nanjing, China.

== Host city selection ==
Nanjing was the only bidder for 2018 edition of championships. The bid was approved by Badminton World Federation during council meeting in Kuala Lumpur, Malaysia.

== Schedule ==
Five events were held.

All times are local (UTC+8).

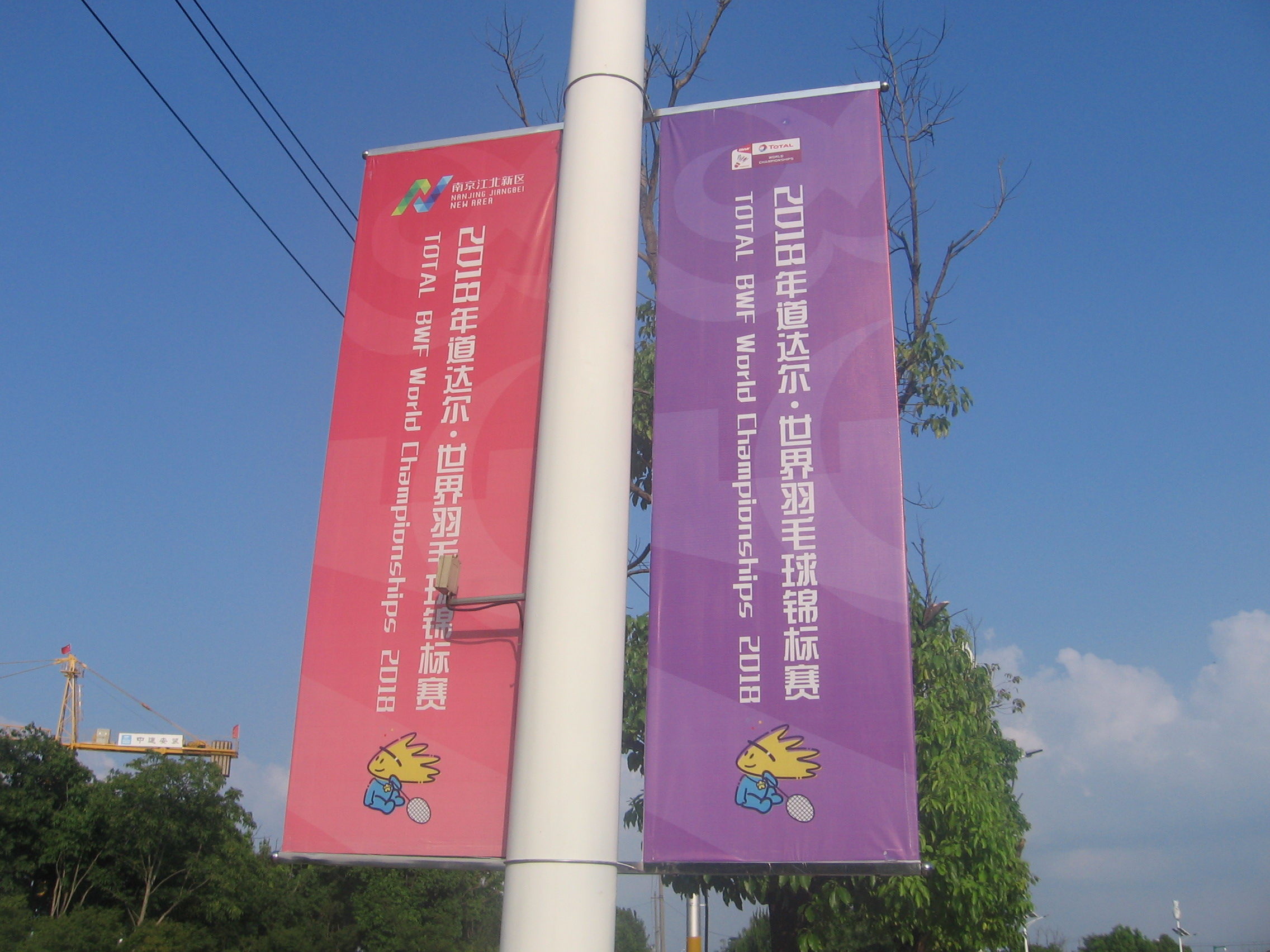
A banner of the Championship near the venue

Date	Time	Round
30 July 2018	10:00	Round of 64
31 July 2018	10:00	Round of 64 (MS)
31 July 2018	10:00	Round of 32 (WS, MD, WD, XD)
1 August 2018	10:00	Round of 32 (MS, WS, MD, WD)
2 August 2018	10:00	Round of 16
3 August 2018	11:00	Quarterfinals
4 August 2018	11:00	Semifinals
5 August 2018	13:00	Finals

== Players ==
357 players from 48 countries in total participate in this game.

- Algeria (2)
- Australia (1)
- Austria (1)
- Belgium (3)
- Brazil (1)
- Bulgaria (8)
- Canada (7)
- China (25)
- Chinese Taipei (23)
- Croatia (1)
- Czech Republic (4)
- Denmark (17)
- Egypt (4)
- England (10)
- Estonia (1)
- Finland (2)
- France (10)
- Germany (16)
- Hong Kong (14)
- Hungary (1)
- India (25)
- Indonesia (29)
- Ireland (3)
- Israel (1)
- Italy (3)
- Japan (25)
- Jordan (2)
- Malaysia (18)
- Mauritius (2)
- Netherlands (11)
- New Zealand (1)
- Nigeria (2)
- Norway (2)
- Peru (2)
- Poland (3)
- Portugal (1)
- Russia (14)
- Scotland (3)
- Slovakia (1)
- South Korea (6)
- Spain (4)
- Sri Lanka (1)
- Switzerland (3)
- Thailand (18)
- Turkey (5)
- Ukraine (4)
- United States (8)
- Vietnam (9)

== Medal summary ==
=== Medal table ===
* Host nation (China)

Rank	Nation	Gold	Silver	Bronze	Total
1	China*	2	2	4	8
2	Japan	2	2	2	6
3	Spain	1	0	0	1
4	India	0	1	0	1
5	Chinese Taipei	0	0	1	1
5	Hong Kong	0	0	1	1
5	Indonesia	0	0	1	1
5	Malaysia	0	0	1	1
Totals (8 entries)		5	5	10	20

=== Medalists ===
Event	Gold	Silver	Bronze
Men's singles	Kento Momota; Japan	Shi Yuqi; China	Chen Long; China
Men's singles	Kento Momota; Japan	Shi Yuqi; China	Liew Daren; Malaysia
Women's singles	Carolina Marín; Spain	P. V. Sindhu; India	He Bingjiao; China
Women's singles	Carolina Marín; Spain	P. V. Sindhu; India	Akane Yamaguchi; Japan
Men's doubles	China; Li Junhui; Liu Yuchen	Japan; Takeshi Kamura; Keigo Sonoda	Chinese Taipei; Chen Hung-ling; Wang Chi-lin
Men's doubles	China; Li Junhui; Liu Yuchen	Japan; Takeshi Kamura; Keigo Sonoda	China; Liu Cheng; Zhang Nan
Women's doubles	Japan; Mayu Matsumoto; Wakana Nagahara	Japan; Yuki Fukushima; Sayaka Hirota	Indonesia; Greysia Polii; Apriyani Rahayu
Women's doubles	Japan; Mayu Matsumoto; Wakana Nagahara	Japan; Yuki Fukushima; Sayaka Hirota	Japan; Shiho Tanaka; Koharu Yonemoto
Mixed doubles	China; Zheng Siwei; Huang Yaqiong	China; Wang Yilyu; Huang Dongping	China; Zhang Nan; Li Yinhui
Mixed doubles	China; Zheng Siwei; Huang Yaqiong	China; Wang Yilyu; Huang Dongping	Hong Kong; Tang Chun Man; Tse Ying Suet

== International broadcasters ==
Country/Region	Broadcaster	Ref
China (host)	CCTV	
International (unsold markets only)	YouTube	
Taiwan	ELTA TV 3	
Denmark	TV2 Sport	
Hong Kong	I-Cable	
India	Star Sports	
Indonesia	TVRI	
Indonesia	SportsFix	
Malaysia	Astro	
Singapore	StarHub	
Thailand	True Corporation	
