= Crystal Wong =

Singaporean badminton player

Crystal Wong 黄嘉盈
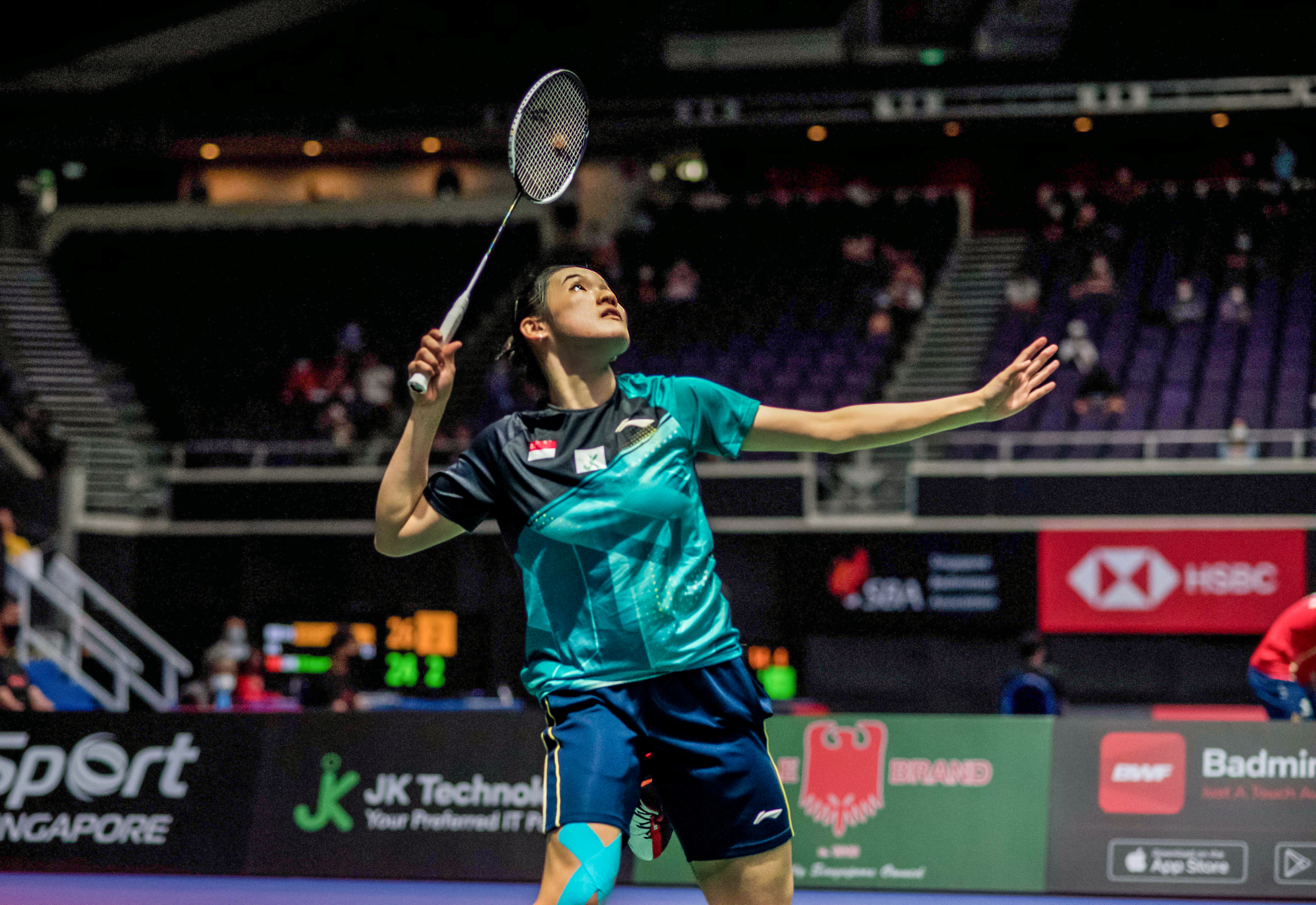
- Wong at the 2022 Singapore Open

Personal information
- Born: Crystal Wong Jia Ying; 2 August 1999 (age 27) Singapore
- Height: 1.62 m (5 ft 4 in)
- Weight: 61 kg (134 lb)

Sport
- Country: Singapore
- Sport: Badminton
- Handedness: Right
- Retired: November 2023

Women's & mixed doubles
- Highest ranking: 16 (WD with Jin Yujia, 23 May 2023); 56 (XD with Danny Bawa Chrisnanta, 6 December 2018); 83 (XD with Andy Kwek, 2 May 2023); 167 (XD with Wesley Koh, 31 January 2023)
- BWF profile
Medal record
Women's badminton
Representing Singapore
Commonwealth Games
| Bronze medal – third place | 2022 Birmingham | Mixed team |
SEA Games
| Bronze medal – third place | 2019 Philippines | Women's team |
| Bronze medal – third place | 2021 Vietnam | Women's team |
| Bronze medal – third place | 2023 Cambodia | Women's team |

Crystal Wong Jia Ying (Chinese: 黄嘉盈; born 2 August 1999) is a retired Singaporean badminton player.

== Career ==
=== 2017–2021 ===
Wong won her first senior international title at the 2017 Iran Fajr International series in Iran, along with her then-partner Ong Ren-ne. At the 2019 Mongolia International, she won the women doubles event partnered with Shinta Mulia Sari, winning against the Korean pair of Jang Eun-seo and Jeong Na-eun, winning against them in 3 sets, 15–21, 21–19, 21–18.

=== 2022 ===
At the 2022 Commonwealth Games, Wong won the bronze medal as part of the Singaporean team that finished as bronze medalists at the mixed team event. The Singaporean team defeated England 3–0 in the bronze medal playoff.

=== 2023 ===
In 2023, Wong won the mixed doubles title at the Uganda International with her partner Andy Kwek.

Wong retired from professional play after ASIAN Games 2022 (delayed due to COVID-19) to focus on university education.

== Achievements ==
=== BWF International Challenge/Series (5 titles, 4 runners-up) ===
Women's doubles
| Year | Tournament | Partner | Opponent | Score | Result |
|---|---|---|---|---|---|
| 2017 | Iran Fajr International | (Singapore) Ong Ren-ne | (Singapore) Citra Putri Sari Dewi (Singapore) Jin Yujia | 11–8, 11–13, 7–11, 11–8, 11–5 | (gold) Winner |
| 2019 | Mongolia International | (Singapore) Shinta Mulia Sari | (South Korea) Jang Eun-seo (South Korea) Jeong Na-eun | 15–21, 21–19, 21–18 | (gold) Winner |
| 2022 | Italian International | (Singapore) Jin Yujia | (Chinese Taipei) Hsu Ya-ching (Chinese Taipei) Lin Wan-ching | 8–21, 8–21 | (silver) Runner-up |
| 2022 | Denmark Masters | (Singapore) Jin Yujia | (Hong Kong) Yeung Nga Ting (Hong Kong) Yeung Pui Lam | 12–21, 17–21 | (silver) Runner-up |
| 2022 | Malaysia International | (Singapore) Jin Yujia | (Thailand) Ornnicha Jongsathapornparn (Thailand) Atitaya Povanon | 21–12, 21–15 | (gold) Winner |
| 2023 | Polish Open | (Singapore) Jin Yujia | (Canada) Catherine Choi (Canada) Josephine Wu | 21–17, 17–21, 21–15 | (gold) Winner |

Mixed doubles
| Year | Tournament | Partner | Opponent | Score | Result |
|---|---|---|---|---|---|
| 2018 | Mongolia International | (Singapore) Danny Bawa Chrisnanta | (Singapore) Bimo Adi Prakoso (Singapore) Jin Yujia | 11–21, 20–22 | (silver) Runner-up |
| 2018 | Sydney International | (Singapore) Danny Bawa Chrisnanta | (Japan) Tadayuki Urai (Japan) Rena Miyaura | 16–21, 17–21 | (silver) Runner-up |
| 2023 | Uganda International | (Singapore) Andy Kwek | (Austria) Philipp Drexler (Austria) Serena Au Yeong | 21–17, 21–19 | (gold) Winner |

BWF International Challenge tournament
BWF International Series tournament
