= Yeung Pui Lam =

Hong Kong badminton player (born 2001)

Yeung Pui Lam 楊霈霖
Personal information
- Born: 26 October 2001 (age 25) Hong Kong
- Height: 1.63 m (5 ft 4 in)

Sport
- Country: Hong Kong
- Sport: Badminton
- Handedness: Right

Women's doubles
- Highest ranking: 12 (with Yeung Nga Ting, 27 August 2024)
- Current ranking: 19 (with Yeung Nga Ting, 3 November 2026)
- BWF profile

Yeung Pui Lam (Chinese: 楊霈霖; born 26 October 2001) is a Hong Kong badminton player. She represented Hong Kong in women's doubles at the 2024 Summer Olympics.

== Career ==
In 2021, she partnered with Yeung Nga Ting and won the women's doubles titles at the Bahrain International Series and Challenge tournaments. In 2022, the duo won the Portugal International and the Polish Open.

In 2024, the Yeung duo qualified for the women's doubles event at the 2024 Summer Olympics. The duo lost their first match to Gabriela Stoeva and Stefani Stoeva of Bulgaria. In their second match, they beat Annie Xu and Kerry Xu of the United States. The duo did not advance to the knockout stage after losing the final group match to Liu Shengshu and Tan Ning of China.

== Achievements ==
=== BWF International Challenge/Series (6 titles, 1 runner-up) ===
Women's doubles
Year	Tournament	Partner	Opponent	Score	Result
2021	Bahrain International Series	(Hong Kong) Yeung Nga Ting	(Hong Kong) Ng Tsz Yau (Hong Kong) Tsang Hiu Yan	21–13, 21–18	(gold) Winner
2021	Bahrain International Challenge	(Hong Kong) Yeung Nga Ting	(Hong Kong) Ng Tsz Yau (Hong Kong) Tsang Hiu Yan	21–12, 21–18	(gold) Winner
2022	Portugal International	(Hong Kong) Yeung Nga Ting	(France) Sharone Bauer (France) Vimala Hériau	21–14, 21–8	(gold) Winner
2022	Polish Open	(Hong Kong) Yeung Nga Ting	(Chinese Taipei) Lee Chia-hsin (Chinese Taipei) Teng Chun-hsun	21–9, 21–18	(gold) Winner
2022	Dutch International	(Hong Kong) Yeung Nga Ting	(Hong Kong) Ng Tsz Yau (Hong Kong) Tsang Hiu Yan	20–22, 21–14, 21–23	(silver) Runner-up
2022	Denmark Masters	(Hong Kong) Yeung Nga Ting	(Singapore) Jin Yujia (Singapore) Crystal Wong	21–12, 21–17	(gold) Winner

Mixed doubles
Year	Tournament	Partner	Opponent	Score	Result
2022	Slovak Open	(Hong Kong) Yeung Ming Nok	(Poland) Wiktor Trecki (Poland) Magdalena Świerczyńska	21–16, 21–12	(gold) Winner

BWF International Challenge tournament
BWF International Series tournament
BWF Future Series tournament
