= Jin Yujia =

Singaporean badminton player (born 1997)

Jin Yujia 金羽佳
Personal information
- Born: 6 February 1997 (age 29) Hangzhou, China
- Height: 1.72 m (5 ft 8 in)

Sport
- Country: Singapore
- Sport: Badminton
- Handedness: Right

Women's & mixed doubles
- Highest ranking: 16 (WD with Crystal Wong, 23 May 2023); 21 (XD with Terry Hee, 23 September 2025)
- BWF profile
Medal record
Women's badminton
Representing Singapore
Commonwealth Games
Bronze medal – third place	2022 Birmingham	Mixed team
SEA Games
Bronze medal – third place	2019 Philippines	Women's team
Bronze medal – third place	2021 Vietnam	Women's team
Bronze medal – third place	2023 Cambodia	Women's team
Bronze medal – third place	2025 Thailand	Women's team

Jin Yujia (Chinese: 金羽佳; pinyin: Jīn Yǔjiā; born 6 February 1997) is a retired Singaporean badminton player.

== Early life ==
Born in Hangzhou, Jin arrived in Singapore in early 2008 when she was 10 not intending to become an athlete, but rather as a student. She attended Yu Neng Primary School at Bedok and completed her O Levels examinations at Anglican High School at Tanah Merah.

However, as her mother Yang Nianhong was an ex-Chinese national player in badminton, she was used to playing with the sport recreationally. Eventually, she played well enough to join the Singapore national team on her own merit to play full-time.

== Career ==
Jin won her first senior international title at the 2017 India International Series tournament in Hyderabad, India. At the 2018 Mongolia International, she won double titles in the mixed and women's doubles event.

=== 2022 Commonwealth Games ===
At the 2022 Commonwealth Games, Jin won the bronze medal as Singapore finished bronze medalists at the mixed team event after defeating England 3–0.

== Achievements ==
=== BWF World Tour (1 runner-up) ===
The BWF World Tour, which was announced on 19 March 2017 and implemented in 2018, is a series of elite badminton tournaments sanctioned by the Badminton World Federation (BWF). The BWF World Tours are divided into levels of World Tour Finals, Super 1000, Super 750, Super 500, Super 300 (part of the HSBC World Tour), and the BWF Tour Super 100.

Mixed doubles
Year	Tournament	Level	Partner	Opponent	Score	Result
2024	Odisha Masters	Super 100	(Singapore) Terry Hee	(China) Gao Jiaxuan (China) Tang Ruizhi	21–15, 15–21, 15–21	(silver) Runner-up

=== BWF International Challenge/Series (8 titles, 3 runners-up) ===
Women's doubles
Year	Tournament	Partner	Opponent	Score	Result
2017	Iran Fajr International	(Singapore) Citra Putri Sari Dewi	(Singapore) Ren-ne Ong (Singapore) Crystal Wong	8–11, 13–11, 11–7, 8–11, 5–11	(silver) Runner-up
2017	India International	(Singapore) Citra Putri Sari Dewi	(Malaysia) Lim Jee Lynn (Malaysia) Yap Zhen	20–22, 21–9, 21–13	(gold) Winner
2018	Mongolia International	(Singapore) Citra Putri Sari Dewi	(Macau) Gong Xue Xin (Macau) Ng Weng Chi	21–16, 21–9	(gold) Winner
2019	Lao International	(Singapore) Lim Ming Hui	(Thailand) Ruethaichanok Laisuan (Thailand) Supamart Mingchua	23–21, 12–21, 21–14	(gold) Winner
2022	Italian International	(Singapore) Crystal Wong	(Chinese Taipei) Hsu Ya-ching (Chinese Taipei) Lin Wan-ching	8–21, 8–21	(silver) Runner-up
2022	Denmark Masters	(Singapore) Crystal Wong	(Hong Kong) Yeung Nga Ting (Hong Kong) Yeung Pui Lam	12–21, 17–21	(silver) Runner-up
2022	Malaysia International	(Singapore) Crystal Wong	(Thailand) Ornnicha Jongsathapornparn (Thailand) Atitaya Povanon	21–12, 21–15	(gold) Winner
2023	Polish Open	(Singapore) Crystal Wong	(Canada) Catherine Choi (Canada) Josephine Wu	21–17, 17–21, 21–15	(gold) Winner

Mixed doubles
Year	Tournament	Partner	Opponent	Score	Result
2018	Mongolia International	(Singapore) Bimo Adi Prakoso	(Singapore) Danny Bawa Chrisnanta (Singapore) Crystal Wong	21–11, 22–20	(gold) Winner
2024	Bendigo International	(Singapore) Wesley Koh	(Chinese Taipei) Chen Cheng-kuan (Chinese Taipei) Lee Chih-chen	21–13, 19–21, 22–20	(gold) Winner
2024	Bangladesh International	(Singapore) Terry Hee	(India) Bokka Navaneeth (India) Ritika Thaker	21–14, 21–16	(gold) Winner

BWF International Challenge tournament
BWF International Series tournament
