= Yeung Nga Ting =

Hong Kong badminton player (born 1998)

Yeung Nga Ting 楊雅婷
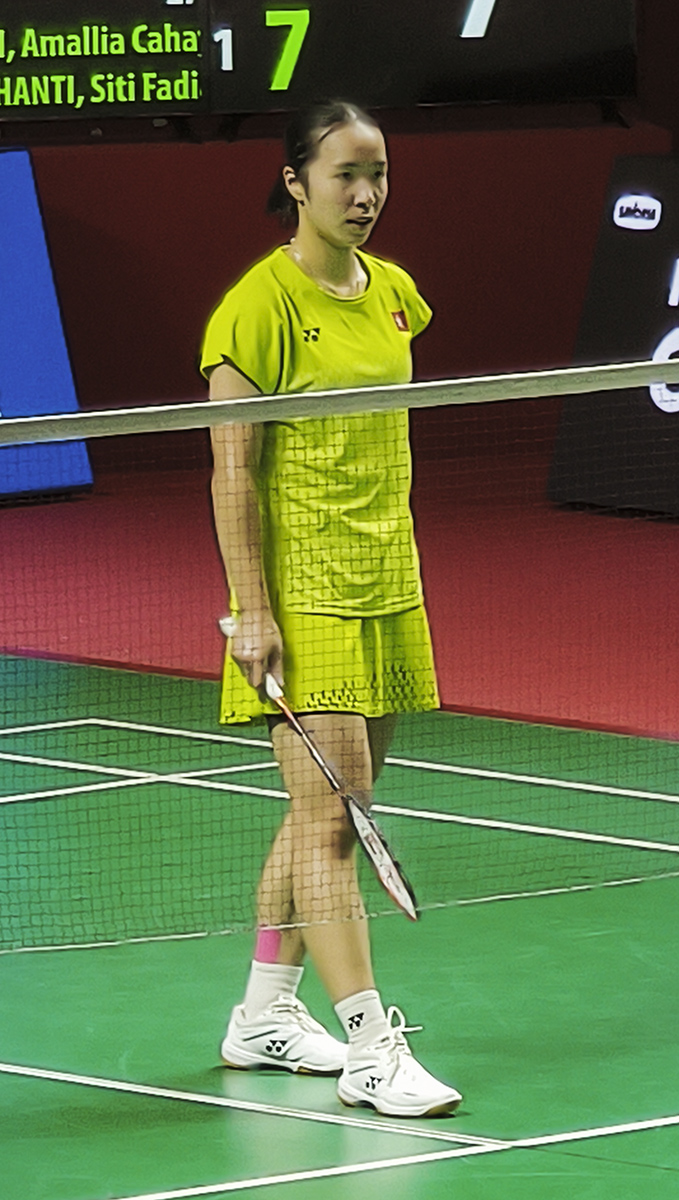
- Yeung at the 2026 Indonesia Open

Personal information
- Born: 13 October 1998 (age 28) Hong Kong
- Height: 1.66 m (5 ft 5 in)

Sport
- Country: Hong Kong
- Sport: Badminton
- Handedness: Right

Women's doubles
- Highest ranking: 12 (with Yeung Pui Lam, 27 August 2024)
- Current ranking: 19 (with Yeung Pui Lam, 3 November 2026)
- BWF profile
Medal record
Women's badminton
Representing Hong Kong
Asia Mixed Team Championships
Bronze medal – third place	2019 Hong Kong	Mixed team

Lianne Yeung Nga Ting (Chinese: 楊雅婷; born 13 October 1998) is a Hong Kong badminton player. She represented Hong Kong in women's doubles at the 2024 Summer Olympics.

== Career ==
In November 2017, she partnered with Ng Tsz Yau won the women's doubles title at the Tata Open India International tournament. She also won the mixed doubles title with Mak Hee Chun. She defended her India International title in 2018 partnered with Ng Wing Yung.

In 2021, she partnered with Yeung Pui Lam and won the women's doubles titles at the Bahrain International Series tournament and the Bahrain International Challenge tournament. In 2022, the duo won the Portugal International and the Polish Open. In the 2022 Dutch International final, they lost to their compatriots Ng Tsz Yau and Tsang Hiu Yan. After the loss, the duo went on to win the Denmark Masters tournament.

In 2024, the Yeung duo qualified for the women's doubles event at the 2024 Summer Olympics. The duo lost their first match to Gabriela Stoeva and Stefani Stoeva of Bulgaria. In their second match, they beat Annie Xu and Kerry Xu of the United States. The duo did not advance to the knockout stage after losing the final group match to Liu Shengshu and Tan Ning of China.

== Achievements ==
=== BWF International Challenge/Series (10 titles, 3 runners-up) ===
Women's doubles
Year	Tournament	Partner	Opponent	Score	Result
2017	Tata Open India International	(Hong Kong) Ng Tsz Yau	(Hong Kong) Ng Wing Yung (Hong Kong) Yuen Sin Ying	23–25, 21–14, 21–19	(gold) Winner
2018	Singapore International	(Hong Kong) Ng Wing Yung	(Hong Kong) Ng Tsz Yau (Hong Kong) Yuen Sin Ying	17–21, 17–21	(silver) Runner-up
2018	Tata Open India International	(Hong Kong) Ng Wing Yung	(India) Meghana Jakkampudi (India) Poorvisha S. Ram	21–10, 21–11	(gold) Winner
2021	Bahrain International Series	(Hong Kong) Yeung Pui Lam	(Hong Kong) Ng Tsz Yau (Hong Kong) Tsang Hiu Yan	21–13, 21–18	(gold) Winner
2021	Bahrain International Challenge	(Hong Kong) Yeung Pui Lam	(Hong Kong) Ng Tsz Yau (Hong Kong) Tsang Hiu Yan	21–12, 21–18	(gold) Winner
2022	Portugal International	(Hong Kong) Yeung Pui Lam	(France) Sharone Bauer (France) Vimala Hériau	21–14, 21–8	(gold) Winner
2022	Polish Open	(Hong Kong) Yeung Pui Lam	(Chinese Taipei) Lee Chia-hsin (Chinese Taipei) Teng Chun-hsun	21–9, 21–18	(gold) Winner
2022	Dutch International	(Hong Kong) Yeung Pui Lam	(Hong Kong) Ng Tsz Yau (Hong Kong) Tsang Hiu Yan	20–22, 21–14, 21–23	(silver) Runner-up
2022	Denmark Masters	(Hong Kong) Yeung Pui Lam	(Singapore) Jin Yujia (Singapore) Crystal Wong	21–12, 21–17	(gold) Winner

Mixed doubles
Year	Tournament	Partner	Opponent	Score	Result
2017	Tata Open India International	(Hong Kong) Mak Hee Chun	(Hong Kong) Chang Tak Ching (Hong Kong) Ng Wing Yung	21–11, 17–21, 21–18	(gold) Winner
2021	Bahrain International	(Hong Kong) Law Cheuk Him	(Hong Kong) Lee Chun Hei (Hong Kong) Ng Tsz Yau	21–23, 12–21	(silver) Runner-up
2021	Bahrain International Challenge	(Hong Kong) Law Cheuk Him	(Indonesia) Akbar Bintang Cahyono (Indonesia) Winny Oktavina Kandow	11–21, 21–13, 21–11	(gold) Winner

BWF International Challenge tournament
BWF International Series tournament
