= 2019 Vietnam Open (badminton) =

2019 badminton tournament in Ho Chi Minh City

Tournament details
- Dates: 10–15 September
- Level: Super 100
- Total prize money: US$75,000
- Venue: Nguyen Du Cultural Sports Club
- Location: Ho Chi Minh City, Vietnam

Champions
- Men's singles: (India) Sourabh Verma
- Women's singles: (China) Zhang Yiman
- Men's doubles: (South Korea) Choi Sol-gyu (South Korea) Seo Seung-jae
- Women's doubles: (Indonesia) Della Destiara Haris (Indonesia) Rizki Amelia Pradipta
- Mixed doubles: (China) Guo Xinwa (China) Zhang Shuxian

The 2019 Vietnam Open (officially known as the Yonex-Sunrise Vietnam Open 2019 for sponsorship reasons) was a badminton tournament which took place at Nguyen Du Cultural Sports Club in Ho Chi Minh City, Vietnam, from 10 to 15 September 2019 and had a total purse of $75,000.

== Tournament ==
The 2019 Vietnam Open was the seventh Super 100 tournament of the 2019 BWF World Tour and also part of the Vietnam Open championships, which had been held since 1996. This tournament was organized by the Ho Chi Minh City Badminton Association and sanctioned by the BWF.

=== Venue ===
This tournament was held at Nguyen Du Cultural Sports Club in Ho Chi Minh City, Vietnam.

=== Point distribution ===
Below is the point distribution table for each phase of the tournament based on the BWF points system for the BWF Tour Super 100 event.

Winner	Runner-up	3/4	5/8	9/16	17/32	33/64	65/128	129/256
5,500	4,680	3,850	3,030	2,110	1,290	510	240	100

=== Prize money ===
The total prize money for this tournament was US$75,000. Distribution of prize money was in accordance with BWF regulations.

Event	Winner	Finals	Semi-finals	Quarter-finals	Last 16
Singles	$5,625	$2,850	$1,087.50	$450	$262.50
Doubles	$5,925	$2,850	$1,050	$543.75	$281.25

== Men's singles ==
=== Seeds ===
1. (Malaysia) Liew Daren (second round)
2. (India) Sourabh Verma (champion)
3. (India) Subhankar Dey (second round)
4. (Thailand) Kunlavut Vitidsarn (second round)
5. (South Korea) Heo Kwang-hee (second round)
6. (Thailand) Tanongsak Saensomboonsuk (quarter-finals)
7. (France) Lucas Corvée (third round)
8. (Indonesia) Chico Aura Dwi Wardoyo (second round)

=== Finals ===
Semi-finals
(China) Sun Feixiang	21	21
(Chinese Taipei) Lin Yu-hsien	17	16
(Japan) Minoru Koga	20	15
2	(India) Sourabh Verma	22	21

Final
(China) Sun Feixiang	12	21	14
2	(India) Sourabh Verma	21	17	21

=== Top half ===
==== Section 1 ====
First Round
(Malaysia) I Zulkarnain	18	7
PFQ	(India) Si Verma	21	21
(Azerbaijan) A R Dwicahyo	10	11
Q1	(China) Lei LX	21	21
(Japan) K Watanabe	21	21
PFQ	(Slovenia) M Ivanič	10	2
Q3	(Thailand) S Jamsri	16	17
(China) Weng HY	21	21

Second Round
1	(Malaysia) Liew D	21	19	12
PFQ	(India) Si Verma	17	21	21
(Indonesia) I Rumbay	13	21
Q1	(China) Lei LX	21	23
5	(South Korea) Heo K-h	13	29	17
(Japan) K Watanabe	21	27	21
(China) Sun FX	21	11	21
(China) Weng HY	17	21	19

Third Round
PFQ	(India) Si Verma	12	15
Q1	(China) Lei LX	21	21
(Japan) K Watanabe	20	10
(China) Sun FX	22	21

Quarter-finals
Q1	(China) Lei LX	21	22	14
(China) Sun FX	14	24	21

==== Section 2 ====
First Round
Q4	(Malaysia) Tan J W	14	21	21
(India) Siddharth P S	21	11	18
(Russia) V Malkov	19	18
(Chinese Taipei) Lin Y-h	21	21
(Azerbaijan) A Qowimuramadhoni	12	5
Q7	(Indonesia) B K Nugroho	21	21
(Malaysia) Soo T Z	12	21	21
(Thailand) A Namkul	21	17	11

Second Round
3	(India) S Dey	11	17
Q4	(Malaysia) Tan J W	21	21
Q2	(Japan) S Omoto	19	10
(Chinese Taipei) Lin Y-h	21	21
7	(France) L Corvee	15	21	21
Q7	(Indonesia) B K Nugroho	21	13	14
(Malaysia) Song J V	21	18	21
(Malaysia) Soo T Z	15	21	19

Third Round
Q4	(Malaysia) Tan J W	21	9	19
(Chinese Taipei) Lin Y-h	18	21	21
7	(France) L Corvee	16	16
(Malaysia) Song J V	21	21

Quarter-finals
(Chinese Taipei) Lin Y-h	21	22
(Malaysia) Song J V	16	20

=== Bottom half ===
==== Section 3 ====
First Round
(Vietnam) Phạm C C	21	21
PFQ	(Mauritius) G J Paul	12	16
PFQ	(Japan) T Obayashi	21	21
(Chinese Taipei) Yang C-c	16	16
Q6	(Vietnam) Nguyen H D	21	21
(France) L Claerbout	19	19
(Indonesia) F A Kholik	21	13	4^{r}
(Japan) M Koga	17	21	9

Second Round
(Vietnam) Phạm C C	19	14
Q5	(Malaysia) Ng J Y	21	21
PFQ	(Japan) T Obayashi	18	16
6	(Thailand) T Saensomboonsuk	21	21
Q6	(Vietnam) Nguyen H D	15	14
Q8	(Chinese Taipei) Hsueh H-y	21	21
(Japan) M Koga	21	12	21
4	(Thailand) K Vitidsarn	13	21	17

Third Round
Q5	(Malaysia) Ng J Y	13	18
6	(Thailand) T Saensomboonsuk	21	21
Q8	(Chinese Taipei) Hsueh H-y	17	14
(Japan) M Koga	21	21

Quarter-finals
6	(Thailand) T Saensomboonsuk	21	22	16
(Japan) M Koga	13	24	21

==== Section 4 ====
First Round
(Chinese Taipei) Lin C-y	14	21	17
(Chinese Taipei) Lu C-h	21	10	21
(Vietnam) Nguyễn T M	21	21
(France) T Rouxel	10	18
(China) Liu HC	23	2^{r}
(Canada) XD Sheng	25	3
(Indonesia) S D Kuncoro	16	16
(Japan) K Naraoka	21	21

Second Round
(Chinese Taipei) Lu C-h	8	15
(China) Li SF	21	21
(Vietnam) Nguyễn T M	21	21
8	(Indonesia) C A D Wardoyo	15	14
(Canada) XD Sheng	15	15
(Japan) Y Igarashi	21	21
(Japan) K Naraoka	20	20
2	(India) So Verma	22	22

Third Round
(China) Li SF	21	19
(Vietnam) Nguyễn T M	23	21
(Japan) Y Igarashi	23	22
2	(India) So Verma	25	24

Quarter-finals
(Vietnam) Nguyễn T M	13	18
2	(India) So Verma	21	21

== Women's singles ==
=== Seeds ===
1. (Scotland) Kirsty Gilmour (second round)
2. (Spain) Carolina Marín (first round)
3. (Japan) Saena Kawakami (first round)
4. (Germany) Yvonne Li (second round)
5. (China) Zhang Yiman (champion)
6. (South Korea) Kim Hyo-min (second round)
7. (Japan) Ayumi Mine (second round)
8. (Chinese Taipei) Pai Yu-po (second round)

=== Finals ===
Semi-finals
Q1	(Japan) Natsuki Oie	15	19
Q3	(Japan) Asuka Takahashi	21	21
5	(China) Zhang Yiman	21	21
(China) Wang Zhiyi	13	19

Final
Q3	(Japan) Asuka Takahashi	18	11
5	(China) Zhang Yiman	21	21

=== Top half ===
==== Section 1 ====
First Round
1	(Scotland) K Gilmour	21	21
(United States) C Pan	15	19
Q1	(Japan) N Oie	21	21
(Indonesia) L A Mainaky	13	19
7	(Japan) A Mine	21	21
(Thailand) C Jucharoen	14	6
(China) Ji ST	21	21
(United States) I Wang	18	17

Second Round
1	(Scotland) K Gilmour	11	21	16
Q1	(Japan) N Oie	21	15	21
7	(Japan) A Mine	16	13
(China) Ji ST	21	21

Quarter-finals
Q1	(Japan) N Oie	21	21
(China) Ji ST	19	18

==== Section 2 ====
First Round
3	(Japan) S Kawakami	18	18
(Chinese Taipei) Hung Y-t	21	21
(Chinese Taipei) Sung S-y	21	21
(Germany) F Deprez	18	17
6	(South Korea) Kim H-m	21	21
(Vietnam) Nguyễn T L	17	17
Q3	(Japan) A Takahashi	21	21
(India) S U R Chukka	10	12

Second Round
(Chinese Taipei) Hung Y-t	14	16
(Chinese Taipei) Sung S-y	21	21
6	(South Korea) Kim H-m	18	10
Q3	(Japan) A Takahashi	21	21

Quarter-finals
(Chinese Taipei) Sung S-y	21	16	14
Q3	(Japan) A Takahashi	18	21	21

=== Bottom half ===
==== Section 3 ====
First Round
(Vietnam) Vũ T T	20	21	21
Q4	(China) Li Y	22	10	6
(Chinese Taipei) Chen S-y	23	14	19
5	(China) Zhang YM	21	21	21
PFQ	(India) V Gummadi	10	13
(South Korea) Sim Y-j	21	21
(Chinese Taipei) Chiang Y-l	11	21	16
4	(Germany) Y Li	21	17	21

Second Round
(Vietnam) Vũ T T	21	20	6
5	(China) Zhang YM	15	22	21
(South Korea) Sim Y-j	21	21
4	(Germany) Y Li	13	10

Quarter-finals
5	(China) Zhang YM	21	12	21
(South Korea) Sim Y-j	17	21	14

==== Section 4 ====
First Round
(China) Wang ZY	21	21
(Switzerland) S Jaquet	13	11
(India) R Mookerjee	23	9
8	(Chinese Taipei) Pai Y-p	25	21
(Indonesia) Y Y Susanto	21	22
Q2	(Chinese Taipei) Lin H-t	16	20
(Thailand) S Katethong	24	22
2	(Spain) C Marín	22	20

Second Round
(China) Wang ZY	21	21
8	(Chinese Taipei) Pai Y-p	11	18
(Indonesia) Y Y Susanto	15	19
(Thailand) S Katethong	21	21

Quarter-finals
(China) Wang ZY	21	21
(Thailand) S Katethong	16	18

== Men's doubles ==
=== Seeds ===
1. (Chinese Taipei) Lu Ching-yao / Yang Po-han (quarter-finals)
2. (Germany) Mark Lamsfuß / Marvin Seidel (second round)
3. (South Korea) Choi Sol-gyu / Seo Seung-jae (champions)
4. (Chinese Taipei) Lee Jhe-huei / Yang Po-hsuan (semi-finals)
5. (Indonesia) Ricky Karanda Suwardi / Angga Pratama (second round)
6. (China) Huang Kaixiang / Liu Cheng (first round)
7. (China) Ou Xuanyi / Zhang Nan (second round)
8. (South Korea) Kang Min-hyuk / Kim Jae-hwan (first round)

=== Finals ===
Semi-finals
(Thailand) Tinn Isriyanet (Thailand) Kittinupong Kedren	23	14
3	(South Korea) Choi Sol-gyu (South Korea) Seo Seung-jae	25	21
4	(Chinese Taipei) Lee Jhe-huei (Chinese Taipei) Yang Po-hsuan	26	21	15
Q1	(South Korea) Na Sung-seung (South Korea) Wang Chan	24	23	21

Final
3	(South Korea) Choi Sol-gyu (South Korea) Seo Seung-jae	18	21	21
Q1	(South Korea) Na Sung-seung (South Korea) Wang Chan	21	16	14

=== Top half ===
==== Section 1 ====
First Round
1	(Chinese Taipei) Lu C-y (Chinese Taipei) Yang P-h	21	19	21
Q4	(Hong Kong) Mak H C (Hong Kong) Or C C	17	21	11
(Malaysia) N M Azriyn Ayub (Malaysia) Wong T C	14	14
(India) A George (India) S Shukla	21	21
8	(South Korea) Kang M-h (South Korea) Kim J-h	17	18
(Indonesia) A B Cahyono (Indonesia) M R P Isfahani	21	21
(Thailand) T Isriyanet (Thailand) K Kedren	21	21
(Chinese Taipei) Lee F-c (Chinese Taipei) Lee F-j	18	19

Second Round
1	(Chinese Taipei) Lu C-y (Chinese Taipei) Yang P-h	21	21
(India) A George (India) S Shukla	13	11
(Indonesia) A B Cahyono (Indonesia) M R P Isfahani	17	18
(Thailand) T Isriyanet (Thailand) K Kedren	21	21

Quarter-finals
1	(Chinese Taipei) Lu C-y (Chinese Taipei) Yang P-h	21	14	16
(Thailand) T Isriyanet (Thailand) K Kedren	9	21	21

==== Section 2 ====
First Round
3	(South Korea) Choi S-g (South Korea) Seo S-j	4
(Hong Kong) Chung Y (Hong Kong) Tam C H	0^{r}
(Japan) K Matsui (Japan) Y Takeuchi	15	14
(Indonesia) P Kusumawardana (Indonesia) Y Rambitan	21	21
6	(China) Huang KX (China) Liu C	21	17	16
(South Korea) Kim W-h (South Korea) Park K-h	16	21	21
Q2	(Indonesia) K A Haryanto (Indonesia) R A Saputro	14	17
(China) Di ZJ (China) Wang C	21	21

Second Round
3	(South Korea) Choi S-g (South Korea) Seo S-j	22	19	21
(Indonesia) P Kusumawardana (Indonesia) Y Rambitan	20	21	13
(South Korea) Kim W-h (South Korea) Park K-h	18	14
(China) Di ZJ (China) Wang C	21	21

Quarter-finals
3	(South Korea) Choi S-g (South Korea) Seo S-j	21	21
(China) Di ZJ (China) Wang C	12	15

=== Bottom half ===
==== Section 3 ====
First Round
Q3	(Malaysia) Low H Y (Malaysia) Ng E C	21	12	17
(Chinese Taipei) Lin C-y (Chinese Taipei) Yang M-t	18	21	21
(China) Guo XW (China) Wang ZK	21	26	17
5	(Indonesia) R K Suwardi (Indonesia) A Pratama	15	28	21
(India) K P Garaga (India) D Kapila	16	11
(Indonesia) S K Gutama (Indonesia) F W Putra	21	21
(Thailand) C Charoenkitamorn (Thailand) K Namdash	21	17	16
4	(Chinese Taipei) Lee J-h (Chinese Taipei) Yang P-hs	14	21	21

Second Round
(Chinese Taipei) Lin C-y (Chinese Taipei) Yang M-t	21	22
5	(Indonesia) R K Suwardi (Indonesia) A Pratama	10	20
(Indonesia) S K Gutama (Indonesia) F W Putra	17	12
4	(Chinese Taipei) Lee J-h (Chinese Taipei) Yang P-hs	21	21

Quarter-finals
(Chinese Taipei) Lin C-y (Chinese Taipei) Yang M-t	20	17
4	(Chinese Taipei) Lee J-h (Chinese Taipei) Yang P-hs	22	21

==== Section 4 ====
First Round
(Indonesia) M S Fikri (Indonesia) B Maulana	14	21	21
(Japan) M Kaneko (Japan) Y Kubota	21	13	16
(Chinese Taipei) Lin S-k (Chinese Taipei) Tseng M-h	18	17
7	(China) Ou XY (China) Zhang N	21	21
Q1	(South Korea) Na S-s (South Korea) Wang C	21	21
(Japan) S Hoshino (Japan) Y Nishikawa	17	14
(Chinese Taipei) Chang K-c (Chinese Taipei) Lu C-p	16	21	10
2	(Germany) M Lamsfuß (Germany) M Seidel	21	19	21

Second Round
(Indonesia) M S Fikri (Indonesia) B Maulana	14	28	21
7	(China) Ou XY (China) Zhang N	21	26	14
Q1	(South Korea) Na S-s (South Korea) Wang C	21	16	21
2	(Germany) M Lamsfuß (Germany) M Seidel	19	21	18

Quarter-finals
(Indonesia) M S Fikri (Indonesia) B Maulana	16	23	12
Q1	(South Korea) Na S-s (South Korea) Wang C	21	21	21

== Women's doubles ==
=== Seeds ===
1. (Indonesia) Della Destiara Haris / Rizki Amelia Pradipta (champions)
2. (China) Dong Wenjing / Feng Xueying (second round)
3. (France) Émilie Lefel / Anne Tran (first round)
4. (China) Liu Xuanxuan / Xia Yuting (second round)
5. (Japan) Natsu Saito / Naru Shinoya (second round)
6. (Thailand) Chayanit Chaladchalam / Phataimas Muenwong (quarter-finals)
7. (Chinese Taipei) Hsu Ya-ching / Hu Ling-fang (first round)
8. (Japan) Miki Kashihara / Miyuki Kato (second round)

=== Finals ===
Semi-finals
1	(Indonesia) Della Destiara Haris (Indonesia) Rizki Amelia Pradipta	21	21
(Japan) Erina Honda (Japan) Nozomi Shimizu	18	12
(Indonesia) Anggia Shitta Awanda (Indonesia) Pia Zebadiah Bernadet	12	21
(China) Huang Jia (China) Zhang Shuxian	21	23

Final
1	(Indonesia) Della Destiara Haris (Indonesia) Rizki Amelia Pradipta	21	21
(China) Huang Jia (China) Zhang Shuxian	18	17

=== Top half ===
==== Section 1 ====
First Round
1	(Indonesia) D D Haris (Indonesia) R A Pradipta	21	21
(India) A Balan (India) P Sawant	14	14
PFQ	(Japan) C Hoshi (Japan) A Matsuda	21	21
Q1	(China) Gao ZY (China) Peng Q	14	11
6	(Thailand) C Chaladchalam (Thailand) P Muenwong	21	21
(Thailand) S Kanchanasaka (Thailand) N Sukklad	18	14
Q4	(Malaysia) Cheah Y S (Malaysia) P Lim P Y	11	18
(Chinese Taipei) Chiang K-h (Chinese Taipei) Hung S-h	21	21

Second Round
1	(Indonesia) D D Haris (Indonesia) R A Pradipta	21	21
PFQ	(Japan) C Hoshi (Japan) A Matsuda	19	17
6	(Thailand) C Chaladchalam (Thailand) P Muenwong	21	21	21
(Chinese Taipei) Chiang K-h (Chinese Taipei) Hung S-h	23	11	16

Quarter-finals
1	(Indonesia) D D Haris (Indonesia) R A Pradipta	11	21	21
6	(Thailand) C Chaladchalam (Thailand) P Muenwong	21	14	17

==== Section 2 ====
First Round
4	(China) Liu XX (China) Xia YT	14	22	22
Q2	(Indonesia) S F S Ramadhanti (Indonesia) R Sugiarto	21	20	20
PFQ	(Indonesia) N K M Istarani (Indonesia) T O Kusumah	21	21
(Indonesia) Y Barkah (Indonesia) A Imanuela	12	15
8	(Japan) M Kashihara (Japan) M Kato	19	21	21
(Thailand) R Laisuan (Thailand) S Mingchua	21	17	19
(Japan) E Honda (Japan) N Shimizu	18	21	23
(Chinese Taipei) Kuo Y-w (Chinese Taipei) Lin W-C	21	12	21

Second Round
4	(China) Liu XX (China) Xia YT	18	17
PFQ	(Indonesia) N K M Istarani (Indonesia) T O Kusumah	21	21
8	(Japan) M Kashihara (Japan) M Kato	15	11
(Japan) E Honda (Japan) N Shimizu	21	21

Quarter-finals
PFQ	(Indonesia) N K M Istarani (Indonesia) T O Kusumah	17	19
(Japan) E Honda (Japan) N Shimizu	21	21

=== Bottom half ===
==== Section 3 ====
First Round
(Malaysia) A Cheong C Y (Malaysia) Lim C S	16	21	20
(Denmark) A Bøje (Denmark) M Poulsen	21	17	22
(Indonesia) A S Awanda (Indonesia) P Z Bernadet	21	21
7	(Chinese Taipei) Hsu Y-c (Chinese Taipei) Hu L-f	13	13
(Thailand) N Chatupornkarnchana (Thailand) K Dubthuk	11	7
(Thailand) C Korepap (Thailand) K Sudjaipraparat	21	21
(Japan) S Hobara (Japan) N Sone	21	17	21
3	(France) E Lefel (France) A Tran	14	21	12

Second Round
(Denmark) A Bøje (Denmark) M Poulsen	17	14
(Indonesia) A S Awanda (Indonesia) P Z Bernadet	21	21
(Thailand) C Korepap (Thailand) K Sudjaipraparat	21	21
(Japan) S Hobara (Japan) N Sone	19	19

Quarter-finals
(Indonesia) A S Awanda (Indonesia) P Z Bernadet	21	21
(Thailand) C Korepap (Thailand) K Sudjaipraparat	14	19

==== Section 4 ====
First Round
(Germany) L Efler (Germany) I Herttrich	15	23	21
(China) Chen XF (China) Zhou SQ	21	21	18
(Chinese Taipei) Li Z-q (Chinese Taipei) Teng C-h	16	17
5	(Japan) N Saito (Japan) N Shinoya	21	21
(China) Huang J (China) Zhang SX	21	21
Q3	(Vietnam) Dinh T P H (Vietnam) Pham T K	18	12
(Japan) S Ozaki (Japan) A Watanabe	24	20	10
2	(China) Dong WJ (China) Feng XY	22	22	21

Second Round
(Germany) L Efler (Germany) I Herttrich	21	21
5	(Japan) N Saito (Japan) N Shinoya	18	13
(China) Huang J (China) Zhang SX	9	21	21
2	(China) Dong WJ (China) Feng XY	21	17	16

Quarter-finals
(Germany) L Efler (Germany) I Herttrich	21	14	16
(China) Huang J (China) Zhang SX	13	21	21

== Mixed doubles ==
=== Seeds ===
1. (Germany) Mark Lamsfuß / Isabel Herttrich (second round)
2. (Germany) Marvin Seidel / Linda Efler (quarter-finals)
3. (Malaysia) Hoo Pang Ron / Cheah Yee See (quarter-finals)
4. (Chinese Taipei) Lu Ching-yao / Lee Chia-hsin (withdrew)
5. (Hong Kong) Mak Hee Chun / Chau Hoi Wah (semi-finals)
6. (Chinese Taipei) Lee Jhe-huei / Hsu Ya-ching (final)
7. (Denmark) Mathias Christiansen / Alexandra Bøje (first round)
8. (Indonesia) Adnan Maulana / Mychelle Crhystine Bandaso (second round)

=== Finals ===
Semi-finals
6	(Chinese Taipei) Lee Jhe-huei (Chinese Taipei) Hsu Ya-ching	11
5	(Hong Kong) Mak Hee Chun (Hong Kong) Chau Hoi Wah	9^{r}
(China) Guo Xinwa (China) Zhang Shuxian	23	21
(Japan) Tadayuki Urai (Japan) Rena Miyaura	21	13

Final
6	(Chinese Taipei) Lee Jhe-huei (Chinese Taipei) Hsu Ya-ching	21	20	8
(China) Guo Xinwa (China) Zhang Shuxian	18	22	21

=== Top half ===
==== Section 1 ====
First Round
1	(Germany) M Lamsfuß (Germany) I Herttrich	21	16	21
(Chinese Taipei) Lu C-p (Chinese Taipei) Yang C-t	13	21	11
(Thailand) C Charoenkitamorn (Thailand) C Korepap	21	13	13
(Indonesia) R K Suwardi (Indonesia) P Z Bernadeth	15	21	21
6	(Chinese Taipei) Lee J-h (Chinese Taipei) Hsu Y-c	21	21
(Vietnam) Đỗ T Đ (Vietnam) Pham N T	18	19
(Japan) K Yamashita (Japan) N Shinoya	19	21	21
(Thailand) V Kanjanakeereewong (Thailand) R Laisuan	21	18	18

Second Round
1	(Germany) M Lamsfuß (Germany) I Herttrich	23	21	16
(Indonesia) R K Suwardi (Indonesia) P Z Bernadeth	21	23	21
6	(Chinese Taipei) Lee J-h (Chinese Taipei) Hsu Y-c	21	23
(Japan) K Yamashita (Japan) N Shinoya	19	21

Quarter-finals
(Indonesia) R K Suwardi (Indonesia) P Z Bernadeth	21	12	19
6	(Chinese Taipei) Lee J-h (Chinese Taipei) Hsu Y-c	14	21	21

==== Section 2 ====
First Round
3	(Malaysia) Hoo P R (Malaysia) Cheah Y S	21	21
(Japan) H Midorikawa (Japan) N Saito	17	15
(China) Dong WJ (China) Chen XF	21	15	21
(Indonesia) R N Kusharjanto (Indonesia) L A Kusumawati	15	21	16
5	(Hong Kong) Mak H C (Hong Kong) Chau H W	21	15	21
(China) Di ZJ (China) Liu XX	17	21	11
Q3	(Indonesia) R A Saputro (Indonesia) B M Rumambi	21	22
(Thailand) P Thongnuam (Thailand) K Dubthuk	18	20

Second Round
3	(Malaysia) Hoo P R (Malaysia) Cheah Y S	21	17	21
(China) Dong WJ (China) Chen XF	12	21	17
5	(Hong Kong) Mak H C (Hong Kong) Chau H W	21	21
Q3	(Indonesia) R A Saputro (Indonesia) B M Rumambi	12	13

Quarter-finals
3	(Malaysia) Hoo P R (Malaysia) Cheah Y S	21	17	21
5	(Hong Kong) Mak H C (Hong Kong) Chau H W	11	21	23

=== Bottom half ===
==== Section 3 ====
First Round
PFQ	(Indonesia) Z J Sumanti (Indonesia) H Julimarbela	21	15	14
(China) Guo XW (China) Zhang SX	18	21	21
Q1	(Malaysia) Chia WJ (Malaysia) Lim C S	15	14
8	(Indonesia) A Maulana (Indonesia) M C Bandaso	21	21
(Chinese Taipei) Yang P-hs (Chinese Taipei) Hu L-f	21	21
(Hong Kong) Yeung S C (Hong Kong) Fan K Y	7	11
(France) R Labar (France) A Tran	21	21
PFQ	(Thailand) T Viriyangkura (Thailand) K Sudjaipraparat	10	12

Second Round
(China) Guo XW (China) Zhang SX	21	21
8	(Indonesia) A Maulana (Indonesia) M C Bandaso	10	14
(Chinese Taipei) Yang P-hs (Chinese Taipei) Hu L-f	24	21
(France) R Labar (France) A Tran	22	11

Quarter-finals
(China) Guo XW (China) Zhang SX	21	14	21
(Chinese Taipei) Yang P-hs (Chinese Taipei) Hu L-f	10	21	13

==== Section 4 ====
First Round
(Chinese Taipei) Chang K-c (Chinese Taipei) Cheng C-y	21	21
(Denmark) N Nøhr (Denmark) S Thygesen	15	17
(Japan) T Urai (Japan) R Miyaura	21	23
7	(Denmark) M Christiansen (Denmark) A Bøje	8	21
Q4	(China) Chen K (China) Zhou SQ	20	21	21
PFQ	(Indonesia) A P R Putra (Indonesia) M C Sahputri	22	14	16
Q2	(Indonesia) A Pratama (Indonesia) A S Awanda	16	19
2	(Germany) M Seidel (Germany) L Efler	21	21

Second Round
(Chinese Taipei) Chang K-c (Chinese Taipei) Cheng C-y	19	10
(Japan) T Urai (Japan) R Miyaura	21	21
Q4	(China) Chen K (China) Zhou SQ	19	13
2	(Germany) M Seidel (Germany) L Efler	21	21

Quarter-finals
(Japan) T Urai (Japan) R Miyaura	12	21	21
2	(Germany) M Seidel (Germany) L Efler	21	14	14

Preceded by 2019 Chinese Taipei Open	BWF World Tour; 2019 BWF season	Succeeded by 2019 China Open
