= 2019 Indonesia Masters Super 100 =

2019 badminton tournament in Malang

Tournament details
- Dates: 1–6 October
- Edition: 2nd
- Level: Super 100
- Total prize money: US$75,000
- Venue: Ken Arok Sports Hall
- Location: Malang, East Java, Indonesia

Champions
- Men's singles: (China) Sun Feixiang
- Women's singles: (China) Wang Zhiyi
- Men's doubles: (China) Ou Xuanyi (China) Zhang Nan
- Women's doubles: (Indonesia) Siti Fadia Silva Ramadhanti (Indonesia) Ribka Sugiarto
- Mixed doubles: (China) Guo Xinwa (China) Zhang Shuxian

The 2019 Indonesia Masters Super 100 (officially known as the Yuzu Indonesia Masters 2019 for sponsorship reasons) was a badminton tournament which took place at Ken Arok Sports Hall in Malang, East Java, Indonesia, from 1 to 6 October 2019 and had a total purse of $75,000.

== Tournament ==
The 2019 Indonesia Masters Super 100 was the eighth Super 100 tournament of the 2019 BWF World Tour and also part of the Indonesia Masters Super 100 championships, which had been held since 2018. This tournament was organized by the Badminton Association of Indonesia and sanctioned by the BWF.

=== Venue ===
This international tournament was held at Ken Arok Sports Hall in Malang, East Java, Indonesia.

=== Point distribution ===
Below is the point distribution table for each phase of the tournament based on the BWF points system for the BWF Tour Super 100 event.

Winner	Runner-up	3/4	5/8	9/16	17/32	33/64	65/128	129/256
5,500	4,680	3,850	3,030	2,110	1,290	510	240	100

=== Prize money ===
The total prize money for this tournament was US$75,000. Distribution of prize money was in accordance with BWF regulations.

Event	Winner	Finals	Semi-finals	Quarter-finals	Last 16
Singles	$5,625	$2,850	$1,087.50	$450	$262.50
Doubles	$5,925	$2,850	$1,050	$543.75	$281.25

== Men's singles ==
=== Seeds ===
1. (Singapore) Loh Kean Yew (withdrew)
2. (India) Subhankar Dey (withdrew)
3. (Indonesia) Firman Abdul Kholik (second round)
4. (Japan) Kazumasa Sakai (second round)
5. (Thailand) Tanongsak Saensomboonsuk (final)
6. (Indonesia) Ihsan Maulana Mustofa (second round)
7. (Indonesia) Chico Aura Dwi Wardoyo (second round)
8. (China) Sun Feixiang (champion)

=== Finals ===
Semi-finals
8	(China) Sun Feixiang	21	21
(Malaysia) Soong Joo Ven	18	19
5	(Thailand) Tanongsak Saensomboonsuk	21	15	21
(Indonesia) Vicky Angga Saputra	17	21	17

Final
8	(China) Sun Feixiang	21	21
5	(Thailand) Tanongsak Saensomboonsuk	19	14

=== Top half ===
==== Section 1 ====
First round
(Malaysia) Tan J W	21	21
PFQ	(Chinese Taipei) Y Yang	16	17
(Indonesia) A Marteen	14	13
(Japan) T Obayashi	21	21
(Chinese Taipei) Lin C-y	21	17	20
(China) Bai YP	17	21	22
(Japan) S Omoto	21	15	10
(China) Liu HC	17	21	21

Second round
PFQ	(Malaysia) Leong J H	21	19	23
(Malaysia) Tan J W	16	21	25
Q4	(Indonesia) R Subagja	10	11
(Japan) T Obayashi	21	21
8	(China) Sun FX	24	21
(China) Bai YP	22	11
Q7	(Indonesia) H Y Wijayanto	17	21	20
(China) Liu HC	21	14	22

Third round
(Malaysia) Tan J W	21	21
(Japan) T Obayashi	17	13
8	(China) Sun FX	19	23	21
(China) Liu HC	21	21	12

Quarter-finals
(Malaysia) Tan J W	11	18
8	(China) Sun FX	21	21

==== Section 2 ====
First round
Q6	(Indonesia) W Y Prasetyo	21	21
(Azerbaijan) A Qowimuramadhoni	12	11
(Malaysia) Soo T Z	21	21
(England) Chun K L	13	15
Q2	(Malaysia) M Z Md Tah	17	18
(Indonesia) K A Nugraha	21	21
(Malaysia) Cheam J W	15	19
(Malaysia) Soong J V	21	21

Second round
4	(Japan) K Sakai	9	11
Q6	(Indonesia) W Y Prasetyo	21	21
(Japan) M Koga	16	15
(Malaysia) Soo T Z	21	21
7	(Indonesia) C A D Wardoyo	21	20	14
(Indonesia) K A Nugraha	16	22	21
Q1	(Indonesia) M A Apriyandi	11	14
(Malaysia) Soong J V	21	21

Third round
Q6	(Indonesia) W Y Prasetyo	21	21
(Malaysia) Soo T Z	8	15
(Indonesia) K A Nugraha	21	13	23
(Malaysia) Soong J V	10	21	25

Quarter-finals
Q6	(Indonesia) W Y Prasetyo	14	9
(Malaysia) Soong J V	21	21

=== Bottom half ===
==== Section 3 ====
First round
(China) Lei LX	21	17	10
(Malaysia) Goh G C	17	21	21
(Indonesia) H K Wibowo	21	19	17
(Malaysia) Yeoh S Z	18	21	21
(Singapore) J Koh J W	21	12	17
(Indonesia) S D Kuncoro	18	21	21
(Canada) Sheng XD	10	21	16
(China) Ren PB	21	18	21

Second round
(Malaysia) Goh G C	21	21
(Australia) A Joe	11	6
(Malaysia) Yeoh S Z	18	21	18
5	(Thailand) T Saensomboonsuk	21	17	21
(Indonesia) S D Kuncoro	21	21
(Indonesia) M Febriansyah	14	17
(China) Ren PB	21	8	21
3	(Indonesia) F A Kholik	11	21	18

Third round
(Malaysia) Goh G C	17	21	14
5	(Thailand) T Saensomboonsuk	21	18	21
(Indonesia) S D Kuncoro	15	21	11
(China) Ren PB	21	12	21

Quarter-finals
5	(Thailand) T Saensomboonsuk	13	21	21
(China) Ren PB	21	19	18

==== Section 4 ====
First round
Q3	(Indonesia) B K Nugroho	21	17	17
Q5	(Indonesia) A A Yulianto	15	21	21
(Indonesia) V A Saputra	20	22	21
(China) Weng HY	22	20	15
(Malaysia) E Vasigaran	20	16
(Azerbaijan) A R Dwicahyo	22	21
(Indonesia) Y F Mainaky	18	19
Q8	(Indonesia) J Mikhael	21	21

Second round
Q5	(Indonesia) A A Yulianto	8	21	13
(Indonesia) P A Maulana	21	15	21
(Indonesia) V A Saputra	21	21
6	(Indonesia) I M Mustofa	12	10
(Azerbaijan) A R Dwicahyo	21	10	12
(Indonesia) I Rumbay	17	21	21
Q8	(Indonesia) J Mikhael	18	22	22
PFQ	(Malaysia) F Rozain	21	20	20

Third round
(Indonesia) P A Maulana	14	19
(Indonesia) V A Saputra	21	21
(Indonesia) I Rumbay	21	21
Q8	(Indonesia) J Mikhael	13	13

Quarter-finals
(Indonesia) V A Saputra	21	21
(Indonesia) I Rumbay	11	16

== Women's singles ==
=== Seeds ===
1. (Singapore) Yeo Jia Min (first round)
2. (Indonesia) Ruselli Hartawan (quarter-finals)
3. (China) Zhang Yiman (second round)
4. (Thailand) Porntip Buranaprasertsuk (final)
5. (Indonesia) Lyanny Alessandra Mainaky (first round)
6. (Vietnam) Nguyễn Thùy Linh (semi-finals)
7. (China) Ji Shuting (quarter-finals)
8. (China) Wang Zhiyi (champion)

=== Finals ===
Semi-finals
6	(Vietnam) Nguyễn Thùy Linh	11	21	14
4	(Thailand) Porntip Buranaprasertsuk	21	16	21
8	(China) Wang Zhiyi	21	21
(China) Li Yun	14	16

Final
4	(Thailand) Porntip Buranaprasertsuk	22	15	13
8	(China) Wang Zhiyi	20	21	21

=== Top half ===
==== Section 1 ====
First round
1	(Singapore) Yeo J M	13	12
(Indonesia) A O Winata	21	21
PFQ	(Malaysia) K Selvaduray	17	21	15
(Indonesia) S Fatmawati	21	13	21
6	(Vietnam) Nguyễn T L	10	21	21
(Malaysia) Lee Y Y	21	16	18
(Chinese Taipei) Sung S-y	21	12	21
PFQ	(Indonesia) B S Rahayu	17	21	19

Second round
(Indonesia) A O Winata	21	23
(Indonesia) S Fatmawati	16	21
6	(Vietnam) Nguyễn T L	21	21
(Chinese Taipei) Sung S-y	17	14

Quarter-finals
(Indonesia) A O Winata	11	15
6	(Vietnam) Nguyễn T L	21	21

==== Section 2 ====
First round
4	(Thailand) P Buranaprasertsuk	w	/	o
(India) S K P Kudaravalli
(United States) D Gupta	10	17
(Indonesia) Y Y Susanto	21	21
7	(China) Ji ST	21	21
(Japan) H Mizui	11	10
Q2	(China) Zheng SY	21	21
(Indonesia) Choirunnisa	13	19

Second round
4	(Thailand) P Buranaprasertsuk	17	21	21
(Indonesia) Y Y Susanto	21	17	8
7	(China) Ji ST	21	21
Q2	(China) Zheng SY	19	11

Quarter-finals
4	(Thailand) P Buranaprasertsuk	3
7	(China) Ji ST	0^{r}

=== Bottom half ===
==== Section 3 ====
First round
(Japan) S Saito	21	21
(Singapore) G Chua H Z	11	12
(United States) I Wang	13	21	19
8	(China) Wang ZY	21	19	21
Q4	(Indonesia) A D Widyaningrum	21	18	20
(Chinese Taipei) Lin H-t	16	21	22
(Indonesia) D D Ayustine	15	14
3	(China) Zhang YM	21	21

Second round
(Japan) S Saito	7	16
8	(China) Wang ZY	21	21
(Chinese Taipei) Lin H-t	21	21
3	(China) Zhang YM	15	12

Quarter-finals
8	(China) Wang ZY	21	21
(Chinese Taipei) Lin H-t	15	5

==== Section 4 ====
First round
Q1	(Indonesia) D A Syarafina	22	18	13
(China) Li Y	20	21	21
(United States) C Pan	21	21
5	(Indonesia) L A Mainaky	15	18
Q3	(China) Wei YX	21	21
(Chinese Taipei) Chen S-y	17	14
(Japan) A Takahashi	18	19
2	(Indonesia) R Hartawan	21	21

Second round
(China) Li Y	21	21
(United States) C Pan	17	19
Q3	(China) Wei YX	17	12
2	(Indonesia) R Hartawan	21	21

Quarter-finals
(China) Li Y	22	21
2	(Indonesia) R Hartawan	20	16

== Men's doubles ==
=== Seeds ===
1. (Indonesia) Fajar Alfian / Muhammad Rian Ardianto (second round)
2. (Indonesia) Berry Angriawan / Hardianto (semi-finals)
3. (Japan) Akira Koga / Taichi Saito (final)
4. (Malaysia) Mohamad Arif Abdul Latif / Nur Mohd Azriyn Ayub (quarter-finals)
5. (Indonesia) Ricky Karanda Suwardi / Angga Pratama (first round)
6. (China) Huang Kaixiang / Liu Cheng (semi-finals)
7. (China) Ou Xuanyi / Zhang Nan (champions)
8. (Japan) Keiichiro Matsui / Yoshinori Takeuchi (second round)

=== Finals ===
Semi-finals
6	(China) Huang Kaixiang (China) Liu Cheng	21	10	18
7	(China) Ou Xuanyi (China) Zhang Nan	13	21	21
3	(Japan) Akira Koga (Japan) Taichi Saito	21	21
2	(Indonesia) Berry Angriawan (Indonesia) Hardianto	17	16

Final
7	(China) Ou Xuanyi (China) Zhang Nan	11	21	22
3	(Japan) Akira Koga (Japan) Taichi Saito	21	10	20

=== Top half ===
==== Section 1 ====
First round
1	(Indonesia) F Alfian (Indonesia) M R Ardianto	24	21
(England) A Gupta (Indonesia) R D Purnama	22	12
(Singapore) D B Chrisnanta (Singapore) Loh K H	20	12
(Japan) S Hoshino (Japan) Y Nishikawa	22	21
6	(China) Huang KX (China) Liu C	21	22
(Indonesia) H Gustiawan (Indonesia) C Kristanto	17	20
(Indonesia) P Kusumawardana (Indonesia) Y Rambitan	17	30	21
Q2	(Indonesia) E R Febryto (Indonesia) F M Ranialdy	21	29	16

Second round
1	(Indonesia) F Alfian (Indonesia) M R Ardianto	21	16
(Japan) S Hoshino (Japan) Y Nishikawa	23	21
6	(China) Huang KX (China) Liu C	21	21
(Indonesia) P Kusumawardana (Indonesia) Y Rambitan	15	18

Quarter-finals
(Japan) S Hoshino (Japan) Y Nishikawa	14	17
6	(China) Huang KX (China) Liu C	21	21

==== Section 2 ====
First round
4	(Malaysia) M Arif A L (Malaysia) N M Azriyn A	21	21
(England) Chun K L (England) F M Hassan	6	7
(Indonesia) M S Fikri (Indonesia) B Maulana	21	21
(Malaysia) Chen T J (Malaysia) Choong H J	23	23
7	(China) Ou XY (China) Zhang N	21	21
Q1	(Indonesia) G Dwi Putra (Indonesia) G C W Wijaya	12	12
(China) Fan QY (China) Ren XY	16	20
(Indonesia) A B Cahyono (Indonesia) M R P Isfahani	21	22

Second round
4	(Malaysia) M Arif A L (Malaysia) N M Azriyn A	21	21
(Malaysia) Chen T J (Malaysia) Choong H J	16	10
7	(China) Ou XY (China) Zhang N	21	22
(Indonesia) A B Cahyono (Indonesia) M R P Isfahani	19	20

Quarter-finals
4	(Malaysia) M Arif A L (Malaysia) N M Azriyn A	15	14
7	(China) Ou XY (China) Zhang N	21	21

=== Bottom half ===
==== Section 3 ====
First round
(Japan) H Okamura (Japan) M Onodera	21	21
(Chinese Taipei) Lin C-y (Chinese Taipei) Yang Y	17	12
(China) Dong WJ (China) Guo XW	21	21
5	(Indonesia) R K Suwardi (Indonesia) A Pratama	12	18
(Malaysia) Chia W J (Malaysia) Man W C	21	18	21
(Indonesia) S K Gutama (Indonesia) F W Putra	12	21	11
Q4	(Indonesia) D Ferdinansyah (Indonesia) Y E Saputra	14	14
3	(Japan) A Koga (Japan) T Saito	21	21

Second round
(Japan) H Okamura (Japan) M Onodera	9	15
(China) Dong WJ (China) Guo XW	21	21
(Malaysia) Chia W J (Malaysia) Man W C	19	21	20
3	(Japan) A Koga (Japan) T Saito	21	18	22

Quarter-finals
(China) Dong WJ (China) Guo XW	16	14
3	(Japan) A Koga (Japan) T Saito	21	21

==== Section 4 ====
First round
(Indonesia) K A Haryanto (Indonesia) R A Saputro	22	19	21
Q3	(Japan) H Midorikawa (Japan) K Yamashita	20	21	7
(Indonesia) R Dhanriano (Indonesia) A R Mauthuthihona	15	14
8	(Japan) K Matsui (Japan) Y Takeuchi	21	21
(China) Liang WK (China) Shang YC	14	19
PFQ	(Indonesia) M Fachrikar (Indonesia) A Syahnawi	21	21
(Malaysia) Lim T J (Malaysia) Low J S	14	21	13
2	(Indonesia) B Angriawan (Indonesia) Hardianto	21	14	21

Second round
(Indonesia) K A Haryanto (Indonesia) R A Saputro	16	21	22
8	(Japan) K Matsui (Japan) Y Takeuchi	21	17	20
PFQ	(Indonesia) M Fachrikar (Indonesia) A Syahnawi	14	16
2	(Indonesia) B Angriawan (Indonesia) Hardianto	21	21

Quarter-finals
(Indonesia) K A Haryanto (Indonesia) R A Saputro	19	16
2	(Indonesia) B Angriawan (Indonesia) Hardianto	21	21

== Women's doubles ==
=== Seeds ===
1. (China) Du Yue / Li Yinhui (withdrew)
2. (China) Li Wenmei / Zheng Yu (quarter-finals)
3. (Japan) Nami Matsuyama / Chiharu Shida (semi-finals)
4. (Indonesia) Della Destiara Haris / Rizki Amelia Pradipta (final)
5. (Japan) Naru Shinoya / Natsu Saito (second round)
6. (Indonesia) Yulfira Barkah / Agatha Imanuela (quarter-finals)
7. (China) Zhang Shuxian / Huang Jia (semi-finals)
8. (China) Zhou Chaomin / Chen Xiaofei (quarter-finals)

=== Finals ===
Semi-finals
7	(China) Huang Jia (China) Zhang Shuxian	12	21
4	(Indonesia) Della Destiara Haris (Indonesia) Rizki Amelia Pradipta	21	23
3	(Japan) Nami Matsuyama (Japan) Chiharu Shida	20	14
(Indonesia) Siti Fadia Silva Ramadhanti (Indonesia) Ribka Sugiarto	22	21

Final
4	(Indonesia) Della Destiara Haris (Indonesia) Rizki Amelia Pradipta	21	15
(Indonesia) Siti Fadia Silva Ramadhanti (Indonesia) Ribka Sugiarto	23	21

=== Top half ===
==== Section 1 ====
First Round
(Malaysia) Teoh M X (Malaysia) Yap L	14	16
(Malaysia) A Cheong C Y (Malaysia) Lim C S	21	21
7	(China) Huang J (China) Zhang SX	15	21	21
(Chinese Taipei) Chiang K-h (Chinese Taipei) Hung S-h	21	12	19
(Chinese Taipei) Jiang Y-h (Chinese Taipei) Yu C-h	13	15
(China) Chen LZ (China) He XY	21	21

Second Round
1	(China) Du Y (China) Li YH
(Malaysia) A Cheong C Y (Malaysia) Lim C S	w	/	o
7	(China) Huang J (China) Zhang SX	21	21
(China) Chen LZ (China) He XY	12	17

Quarter-finals
(Malaysia) A Cheong C Y (Malaysia) Lim C S	18	18
7	(China) Huang J (China) Zhang SX	21	21

==== Section 2 ====
First round
4	(Indonesia) D D Haris (Indonesia) R A Pradipta	21	22
(Indonesia) B M Rumambi (Indonesia) M C Sahputri	15	20
(Indonesia) A G L Maharani (Indonesia) R E P Sari	21	18	16
(Indonesia) N Melati (Indonesia) T R Nuraidah	17	21	21
8	(China) Chen XF (China) Zhou CM	16	21	21
(Malaysia) P Tan K L (Malaysia) M Thinaah	21	14	19
(Indonesia) N K M Istarani (Indonesia) T O Kusumah
(Indonesia) V Putri (Indonesia) V A Sukoco	w	/	o

Second round
4	(Indonesia) D D Haris (Indonesia) R A Pradipta	21	21
(Indonesia) N Melati (Indonesia) T R Nuraidah	15	9
8	(China) Chen XF (China) Zhou CM	21	19	21
(Indonesia) V Putri (Indonesia) V A Sukoco	12	21	13

Quarter-finals
4	(Indonesia) D D Haris (Indonesia) R A Pradipta	22	22
8	(China) Chen XF (China) Zhou CM	20	20

=== Bottom half ===
==== Section 3 ====
First round
(China) Chen JY (China) Kang Y	21	21
(Malaysia) Cheah Y S (Malaysia) P Lim P Y	10	17
(Indonesia) S Kani (Indonesia) R V Salsabila	12	17
6	(Indonesia) Y Barkah (Indonesia) A Imanuela	21	21
(Chinese Taipei) Tai W-l (Chinese Taipei) Wu Y-c	21	14	21
(Chinese Taipei) Li Z-q (Chinese Taipei) Teng C-h	16	21	19
(Chinese Taipei) Hsu W-c (Chinese Taipei) Lin H-t	11	11
3	(Japan) N Matsuyama (Japan) C Shida	21	21

Second round
(China) Chen JY (China) Kang Y	11	9
6	(Indonesia) Y Barkah (Indonesia) A Imanuela	21	21
(Chinese Taipei) Tai W-l (Chinese Taipei) Wu Y-c	11	8
3	(Japan) N Matsuyama (Japan) C Shida	21	21

Quarter-finals
6	(Indonesia) Y Barkah (Indonesia) A Imanuela	13	13
3	(Japan) N Matsuyama (Japan) C Shida	21	21

==== Section 4 ====
First Round
(Malaysia) R C Yap (Malaysia) Y Yap	16	8
(Indonesia) S F S Ramadhanti (Indonesia) R Sugiarto	21	21
(Indonesia) D D S Budiani (Indonesia) L T Mayasari	16	15
5	(Japan) N Saito (Japan) N Shinoya	21	21
(Indonesia) N S Aulia (Indonesia) D H S Suhana	15	18
(Indonesia) A S Awanda (Indonesia) P Z Bernadeth	21	21

Second Round
(Indonesia) S F S Ramadhanti (Indonesia) R Sugiarto	21	21
5	(Japan) N Saito (Japan) N Shinoya	13	17
(Indonesia) A S Awanda (Indonesia) P Z Bernadeth	11	19
2	(China) Li WM (China) Zheng Y	21	21

Quarter-finals
(Indonesia) S F S Ramadhanti (Indonesia) R Sugiarto	21	21
2	(China) Li WM (China) Zheng Y	13	17

== Mixed doubles ==
=== Seeds ===
1. (Malaysia) Chen Tang Jie / Peck Yen Wei (quarter-finals)
2. (China) Ren Xiangyu / Zhou Chaomin (second round)
3. (Singapore) Danny Bawa Chrisnanta / Tan Wei Han (first round)
4. (Malaysia) Hoo Pang Ron / Cheah Yee See (quarter-finals)
5. (Indonesia) Adnan Maulana / Mychelle Crhystine Bandaso (final)
6. (Indonesia) Rehan Naufal Kusharjanto / Lisa Ayu Kusumawati (semi-finals)
7. (Thailand) Supak Jomkoh / Supissara Paewsampran (second round)
8. (China) Guo Xinwa / Zhang Shuxian (champions)

=== Finals ===
Semi-finals
8	(China) Guo Xinwa (China) Zhang Shuxian	21	21
6	(Indonesia) Rehan Naufal Kusharjanto (Indonesia) Lisa Ayu Kusumawati	18	17
5	(Indonesia) Adnan Maulana (Indonesia) Mychelle Crhystine Bandaso	20	21	21
(Indonesia) Alfian Eko Prasetya (Indonesia) Angelica Wiratama	22	16	12

Final
8	(China) Guo Xinwa (China) Zhang Shuxian	21	16	28
5	(Indonesia) Adnan Maulana (Indonesia) Mychelle Crhystine Bandaso	18	21	26

=== Top half ===
==== Section 1 ====
First round
1	(Malaysia) Chen T J (Malaysia) Peck Y W	21	21
(Indonesia) R Samosir (Indonesia) H Julimarbela	12	19
(Japan) T Urai (Japan) R Miyaura	19	21	16
(China) Dong WJ (China) Chen XF	21	12	21
8	(China) Guo XW (China) Zhang SX	21	17	21
Q1	(China) Shang YC (China) Huang J	16	21	15
(Indonesia) F H Sompie (Indonesia) F E Sompie	15	16
(Indonesia) D Ferdinansyah (Indonesia) S Kani	21	21

Second round
1	(Malaysia) Chen T J (Malaysia) Peck Y W	23	21
(China) Dong WJ (China) Chen XF	21	15
8	(China) Guo XW (China) Zhang SX	21	21
(Indonesia) D Ferdinansyah (Indonesia) S Kani	14	16

Quarter-finals
1	(Malaysia) Chen T J (Malaysia) Peck Y W	17	15
8	(China) Guo XW (China) Zhang SX	21	21

==== Section 2 ====
First round
3	(Singapore) D B Chrisnanta (Singapore) Tan W H	17	21	16
PFQ	(Indonesia) A Syahnawi (Indonesia) P Z Bernadeth	21	19	21
(Indonesia) G A Prihardika (Indonesia) A Saufika	4
(Indonesia) M R Alfarez (Indonesia) N A D Ulhaq	0^{r}
6	(Indonesia) R N Kusharjanto (Indonesia) L A Kusumawati	15	21	23
(Indonesia) Z J Sumanti (Indonesia) M G Islami	21	18	21
(Malaysia) E Vasigaran (Malaysia) D Vasigaran	17	12
(Indonesia) H Gustiawan (Indonesia) A G L Maharani	21	21

Second round
PFQ	(Indonesia) A Syahnawi (Indonesia) P Z Bernadeth	21	21
(Indonesia) G A Prihardika (Indonesia) A Saufika	18	14
6	(Indonesia) R N Kusharjanto (Indonesia) L A Kusumawati	21	21
(Indonesia) H Gustiawan (Indonesia) A G L Maharani	19	18

Quarter-finals
PFQ	(Indonesia) A Syahnawi (Indonesia) P Z Bernadeth	18	21	13
6	(Indonesia) R N Kusharjanto (Indonesia) L A Kusumawati	21	9	21

=== Bottom half ===
==== Section 3 ====
First round
Q2	(Indonesia) T S C Hutomo (Indonesia) L T Mayasari	17	12
(Indonesia) A Ramadiansyah (Indonesia) B F Romadhini	21	21
(Indonesia) A P R Putra (Indonesia) M C Sahputri	21	6	18
5	(Indonesia) A Maulana (Indonesia) M C Bandaso	17	21	21
(Indonesia) R A Saputro (Indonesia) T R Nuraidah	21	20	21
(Malaysia) Man W C (Malaysia) P Tan K L	14	22	19
(Japan) H Midorikawa (Japan) N Saito	18	18
4	(Malaysia) Hoo P R (Malaysia) Cheah Y S	21	21

Second round
(Indonesia) A Ramadiansyah (Indonesia) B F Romadhini	21	11
5	(Indonesia) A Maulana (Indonesia) M C Bandaso	23	21
(Indonesia) R A Saputro (Indonesia) T R Nuraidah	21	13	13
4	(Malaysia) Hoo P R (Malaysia) Cheah Y S	19	21	21

Quarter-finals
5	(Indonesia) A Maulana (Indonesia) M C Bandaso	18	21	21
4	(Malaysia) Hoo P R (Malaysia) Cheah Y S	21	14	16

==== Section 4 ====
First round
Q4	(Malaysia) Choong H J (Malaysia) Teoh M X	11	21	19
(Malaysia) M Arif A L (Indonesia) R A Riodingin	21	19	21
(Malaysia) Chia W J (Malaysia) Lim C S	16	22
7	(Thailand) S Jomkoh (Thailand) S Paewsampran	21	24
(Indonesia) A E Prasetya (Indonesia) A Wiratama	21	11	21
(Japan) K Yamashita (Japan) N Shinoya	15	21	19
Q3	(Indonesia) F M Ranialdy (Indonesia) A S Awanda	10	19
2	(China) Ren XY (China) Zhou CM	21	21

Second round
(Malaysia) M Arif A L (Indonesia) R A Riodingin	21	22
7	(Thailand) S Jomkoh (Thailand) S Paewsampran	5	20
(Indonesia) A E Prasetya (Indonesia) A Wiratama	21	18	24
2	(China) Ren XY (China) Zhou CM	12	21	22

Quarter-finals
(Malaysia) M Arif A L (Indonesia) R A Riodingin	19	18
(Indonesia) A E Prasetya (Indonesia) A Wiratama	21	21

Preceded by 2018 Bangka Belitung Indonesia Masters	Indonesia Masters Super 100	Succeeded by 2022 Indonesia Masters Super 100
Preceded by 2019 Korea Open	BWF World Tour; 2019 BWF season	Succeeded by 2019 Dutch Open
