= Chico Aura Dwi Wardoyo =

Indonesian badminton player (born 1998)

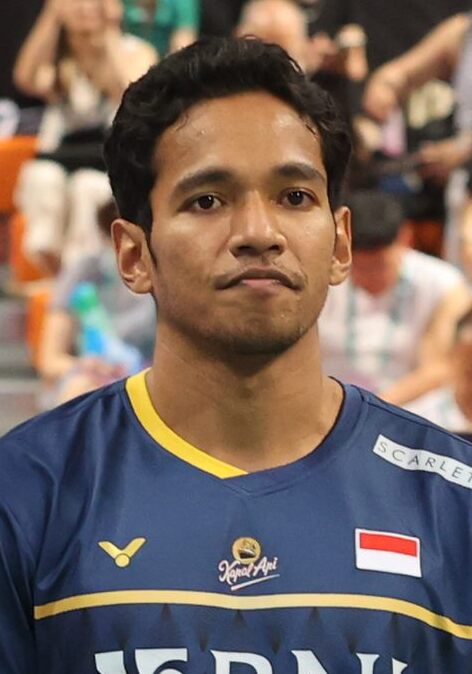
- Dwi Wardoyo at the 2023 Taipei Open

Personal information
- Born: 15 June 1998 (age 28) Jayapura, Irian Jaya, Indonesia
- Height: 1.83 m (6 ft 0 in)

Sport
- Country: Indonesia
- Sport: Badminton
- Handedness: Right

Men's singles
- Highest ranking: 15 (31 January 2023)
- Current ranking: 72 (19 May 2026)
- BWF profile
Medal record
Men's badminton
Representing Indonesia
Thomas Cup
Gold medal – first place	2020 Aarhus	Men's team
Silver medal – second place	2024 Chengdu	Men's team
Asian Championships
Bronze medal – third place	2022 Manila	Men's singles
Asia Team Championships
Silver medal – second place	2022 Selangor	Men's team
SEA Games
Gold medal – first place	2023 Cambodia	Men's team
Silver medal – second place	2023 Cambodia	Men's singles
Bronze medal – third place	2021 Vietnam	Men's team
World Junior Championships
Silver medal – second place	2016 Bilbao	Boys' singles

Chico Aura Dwi Wardoyo (born 15 June 1998) is an Indonesian badminton player. He was a World junior silver medalist in 2016 and Asian Championships bronze medalist in 2022. Dwi Wardoyo was also part of Indonesia winning team at the 2020 Thomas Cup. He is the older brother of Ester Nurumi Tri Wardoyo.

== Career ==
Born in Jayapura, Dwi Wardoyo started his career at the PB Pemda Papua (now PB Cendrawasih), and moved to Jakarta joining the Exist club in 2013. In 2015, he was selected to join the national team as an internship member.

In 2016, he was selected to join Indonesia junior squad to compete at the Asian and World Junior Championships. Indonesia team was stopped in the quarter-finals in both events. In the individual event, he claimed the boys' singles silver medal after being defeated by Sun Feixiang of China.

In May 2021, Dwi Wardoyo reached the Spain Masters finals, but he lost a match to second seed Toma Junior Popov. In October, He made his debut at the Thomas Cup, which is Indonesia won the prestigious Cup after 19 years.

In February 2022, Dwi Wardoyo participated in 2022 Badminton Asia Team Championships with Indonesia and lost the title to Malaysia.

In May 2022, Dwi Wardoyo won a bronze medal at the Asian Championships. In latter May, he won a bronze medal in the men's team at the SEA Games. He then claimed his first World Tour title in the 2022 Malaysia Masters. In the final, he beat Ng Ka Long of Hong Kong in straight games.

=== 2023 ===
Dwi Wardoyo opened the 2023 season at the Malaysia Open, but had to defeat in the second round to Indian player Prannoy H. S. In the next tournament, India Open, he lost in the first round from Chinese player Shi Yuqi in rubber games. Dwi Wardoyo lost the Indonesia Masters against teammate Jonatan Christie. He created an all-Indonesian final men's singles final with Christie; the first one in Indonesian Masters since 2013 final between Dionysius Hayom Rumbaka and Simon Santoso; and the first one in Istora Senayan since 2008 final between Simon Santoso and Sony Dwi Kuncoro.

In February, Dwi Wardoyo join the national team to compete at the Asia Mixed Team Championships, but unfortunately the teams lost in the quarter-finals to South Korea.

In March, Dwi Wardoyo competed in the All England Open but had to lose in the second round from Chinese player Weng Hongyang. In the next tour, he competed in the Swiss Open, but had to retire in the first round from 1st seed Viktor Axelsen.

In late April, Dwi Wardoyo competed at the Asian Championships in Dubai, United Arab Emirates, but had to lose in the second round from 8th seed Indian player Prannoy H. S. in three games.

In May, Dwi Wardoyo join the men's team at the 2023 SEA Games and won the gold medal after beating Malaysian team in the final. He later on competed in the men's singles event and went on to win silver medal, losing to fellow Indonesia's Christian Adinata in the finals. In the following week, Dwi Wardoyo competed in the second Asian Tour at the Malaysia Masters. Unfortunately, he lost in the first round from Chinese Taipei player Lin Chun-yi. In the next tour, Dwi Wardoyo competed in the Thailand Open, but had to lose in the second round from 2nd seed Thai player Kunlavut Vitidsarn in rubber games.

In June, Dwi Wardoyo competed at the home tournament, Indonesia Open, but lost in the first round from 4th seed Singaporean player Loh Kean Yew. In the next tour, he won the Taipei Open by defeating Chinese Taipei player Su Li-yang in straight games.

In July, Dwi Wardoyo competed at the Korea Open, but had to lose in the first round from Japanese player Koki Watanabe in rubber games. In the next tour, he competed at the Japan Open, but lost in the second round against 1st seed Danish player Viktor Axelsen.

In late August, Dwi Wardoyo competed at the World Championships, but lost in the second round from 9th seed Indian player Prannoy H. S. in straight games. He made his debut at the Asian Games in Hangzhou, but the team was eliminated in the quarter-finals.

== Awards and nominations ==
Award	Year	Category	Result	Ref.
Gatra Awards	2021	Sports Category with 2020 Thomas Cup squad	Won	

== Achievements ==
=== Asian Championships ===
Men's singles
Year	Venue	Opponent	Score	Result	Ref.
2022	Muntinlupa Sports Complex; Metro Manila, Philippines	(Indonesia) Jonatan Christie	9–21, 21–18, 16–21	Bronze	

=== SEA Games ===
Men's singles
Year	Venue	Opponent	Score	Result	Ref.
2023	Morodok Techo Badminton Hall; Phnom Penh, Cambodia	(Indonesia) Christian Adinata	12–21, 21–18, 18–21	Silver	

=== BWF World Junior Championships ===
Boys' singles
Year	Venue	Opponent	Score	Result	Ref.
2016	Bilbao Arena; Bilbao, Spain	(China) Sun Feixiang	19–21, 12–21	Silver	

=== BWF World Tour (3 titles, 2 runners-up) ===
The BWF World Tour, which was announced on 19 March 2017 and implemented in 2018, is a series of elite badminton tournaments sanctioned by the Badminton World Federation (BWF). The BWF World Tour is divided into levels of World Tour Finals, Super 1000, Super 750, Super 500, Super 300, and the BWF Tour Super 100.

Men's singles
Year	Tournament	Level	Opponent	Score	Result	Ref.
2021	Spain Masters	Super 300	(France) Toma Junior Popov	15–21, 17–21	(silver) Runner-up	
2022	Malaysia Masters	Super 500	(Hong Kong) Ng Ka Long	22–20, 21–15	(gold) Winner	
2023	Indonesia Masters	Super 500	(Indonesia) Jonatan Christie	15–21, 13–21	(silver) Runner-up	
2023	Taipei Open	Super 300	(Chinese Taipei) Su Li-yang	23–21, 21–15	(gold) Winner	
2025 (I)	Indonesia Masters	Super 100	(South Korea) Jeon Hyeok-jin	13–21, 21–9, 21–17	(gold) Winner	

=== BWF International Challenge/Series (1 title, 2 runners-up) ===
Men's singles
Year	Tournament	Opponent	Score	Result	Ref.
2018	Indonesia International	(Indonesia) Sony Dwi Kuncoro	21–15, 21–9	(gold) Winner	
2019	Vietnam International	(Indonesia) Firman Abdul Kholik	16–21, 7–21	(silver) Runner-up	
2026 (II)	Indonesia International	(Indonesia) Bismo Raya Oktora	13–21, 21–10, 17–21	(silver) Runner-up	

BWF International Challenge tournament
BWF International Series tournament

=== BWF Junior International (1 runner-up) ===
Boys' singles
Year	Tournament	Opponent	Score	Result	Ref.
2016	Jaya Raya Junior International	(Indonesia) Gatjra Piliang Fiqihilahi Cupu	15–21, 11–21	(silver) Runner-up	

BWF Junior International Grand Prix tournament
BWF Junior International Challenge tournament
BWF Junior International Series tournament
BWF Junior Future Series tournament

== Performance timeline ==
Key

W	Won	F	Finalist	SF	Semi-finalist
QF	Quarter-finalist	#R	Rounds 4, 3, 2, 1	RR	Round-robin stage
Q#	Qualification round	A	Absent	w/d	Withdrew
G	Gold	S	Silver	B	Bronze
NH	Not held	N/A	Not applicable	DNQ	Did not qualify

=== National team ===
- Junior level

Team events	2016	Ref
Asian Junior Championships	QF	
World Junior Championships	5th	

- Senior level

Team events	2020	2021	2022	2023	2024	Ref
SEA Games	NH	B	NH	G	NH	
Asia Team Championships	A	NH	S	NH	QF	
Asia Mixed Team Championships	NH			QF	NH	
Asian Games	NH		QF	NH		
Thomas Cup	G	NH	A	NH	S	

=== Individual competitions ===
- Junior level

Events	2016	Ref
Asian Junior Championships	3R	
World Junior Championships	S	

- Senior level

Events	2021	2022	2023	2024	2025	Ref
SEA Games	QF	NH	S	NH	A	
Asian Championships	NH	B	2R	DNQ	1R	
World Championships	DNQ	1R	2R	NH	DNQ	

Tournament	BWF Superseries / Grand Prix		BWF World Tour									Best	Ref
Tournament	2016	2017	2018	2019	2020	2021	2022	2023	2024	2025	2026	Best	Ref
Malaysia Open	A				NH		1R	2R	A			2R ('23)	
India Open	A				NH		A	1R	A			1R ('23)	
Indonesia Masters	2R	NH	Q1	Q2	A	1R	2R	F	1R	1R	A	F ('23)	
Thailand Masters	A		Q1	1R	Q1	NH		A		2R	A	2R ('25)	
All England Open	A							2R	2R	1R	A	2R ('23, '24)	
Swiss Open	A				NH	A	1R	1R	A			1R ('22, '23)	
Ruichang China Masters	N/A		2R	2R	NH			A				2R ('18, '19)	
Orléans Masters	N/A		A		NH	2R	3R	w/d	A			3R ('22)	
Thailand Open	A			Q2	A	NH	A	2R	A			2R ('23)	
Baoji China Masters	N/A								A		2R	2R ('26)	
Malaysia Masters	A			Q1	A	NH	W	1R	2R	2R	A	W ('22)	
Singapore Open	A				NH		1R	A	2R	A		2R ('22)	
Indonesia Open	A				NH	2R	A	1R	1R	1R	A	2R ('21)	
Australian Open	A			1R	NH		1R	A	2R	A		2R ('24)	
Macau Open	A		1R	QF	NH				A	2R	A	QF ('19)	
Japan Open	A				NH		QF	2R	2R	A		QF ('22)	
China Open	A				NH			1R	1R	A		1R ('23, '24)	
Taipei Open	A		2R	1R	NH		w/d	W	A			W ('23)	
Korea Masters	A		2R	A	NH		A			1R	A	2R ('18)	
China Masters	A				NH			1R	2R	A		2R ('24)	
Indonesia Masters Super 100	NH		2R	2R	NH		A	A		W	A	W ('25)	
Indonesia Masters Super 100	NH		2R	2R	NH		A	A		2R	1R	W ('25)	
Vietnam Open	A		Q2	2R	NH		A			2R	A	2R ('19, '25)	
Arctic Open	N/A				NH			2R	A			2R ('23)	
Denmark Open	A						1R	A				1R ('22)	
Malaysia Super 100	N/A							A			2R	2R ('26)	
French Open	A				NH	A	1R	A	SF	A		SF ('24)	
Hylo Open	A						2R	A				2R ('22)	
Korea Open	A				NH		A	1R	1R	2R	A	2R ('25)	
Japan Masters	NH							1R	1R	A		1R ('23, '24)	
Kaohsiung Masters	NH							A			2R	2R ('26)	
Hong Kong Open	A				NH			1R	1R	A		1R ('23, '24)	
Syed Modi International	A		SF	A	NH		A				Q	SF ('18)	
Guwahati Masters	NH							A			Q	('26)	
Odisha Masters	NH						A				Q	('26)	
Akita Masters	NH		QF	w/d	NH							QF ('18)	
Hyderabad Open	NH		3R	3R	NH							3R ('18, '19)	
Russian Open	A			QF	NH							QF ('19)	
Spain Masters	NH		A			F	NH	w/d	A	NH		F ('21)	
Year-end ranking	308	170	69	73	75	54	24	22	31	50		15	
Tournament	2016	2017	2018	2019	2020	2021	2022	2023	2024	2025	2026	Best	Ref
