= 2016 Badminton Asia Junior Championships – Boys' singles =

2016 Badminton Asia Junior Championships – Boys' Singles
Tournament details
- Dates: 13 – 17 July 2016
- Edition: 19
- Venue: CPB Badminton and Sports Science Training Center
- Location: Bangkok, Thailand

The boys' singles tournament of the 2016 Badminton Asia Junior Championships was held from July 13–17. The defending champions of the last edition is Lin Guipu from China. Kantaphon Wangcharoen, Chirag Sen and Koki Watanabe were the top 3 seeded this year. Sun Feixiang of China emerged as the champion after beat Lee Chia-hao of Chinese Taipei in the finals with the score 21–13, 21–15.

== Seeded ==
1. (Thailand) Kantaphon Wangcharoen (quarter-final)
2. (India) Chirag Sen (withdrew)
3. (Japan) Koki Watanabe (fourth round)
4. (Malaysia) Lee Zii Jia (quarter-final)
5. (Thailand) Pachaarapol Nipornram (quarter-final)
6. (Thailand) Korakrit Laotrakul (quarter-final)
7. (Chinese Taipei) Lee Chia-hao (final)
8. (China) Sun Feixiang (champion)
9. (Singapore) Ryan Ng (third round)
10. (Thailand) Kandis Wanaroon (second round)
11. (Indonesia) Ramadhani Muhammad Zulkifli (fourth round)
12. (Thailand) Kittipong Imnark (second round)
13. (Indonesia) Chico Aura Dwi Wardoyo (third round)
14. (Malaysia) Leong Jun Hao (fourth round)
15. (India) Lakshya Sen (semi-final)
16. (Philippines) Mark Alcala (withdrew)

== Draw ==
=== Finals ===
Quarterfinals
1	(Thailand) Kantaphon Wangcharoen	16	18
8	(China) Sun Feixiang	21	21
15	(India) Lakshya Sen	16	21	21
6	(Thailand) Korakrit Laotrakul	21	12	19
7	(Chinese Taipei) Lee Chia-hao	20	21	21
4	(Malaysia) Lee Zii Jia	22	11	15
6	(Thailand) Pacharaapol Nipornram	20	11
(China) Liu Haichao	22	21

Semifinals
8	(China) Sun Feixiang	21	21
15	(India) Lakshya Sen	12	16
7	(Chinese Taipei) Lee Chia-hao	21	16	21
(China) Liu Haichao	14	21	17

Final
8	(China) Sun Feixiang	21	21
7	(Chinese Taipei) Lee Chia-hao	13	15

=== Top half ===
==== Section 1 ====
First round

Second round
1	(Thailand) K Wangcharoen	21	21
(Mongolia) T Boldbaatar	5	7
(Sri Lanka) K Amarasena	10	23	18
(Vietnam) Dang QH	21	21	21
9	(Singapore) R Ng	14	21	21
(Myanmar) Phone PN	21	18	9
(Japan) K Yamashita	21	21
(Pakistan) A Jalal	5	9

Third round
1	(Thailand) K Wangcharoen	21	21
(Vietnam) Dang QH	10	12
9	(Singapore) R Ng	16	21	12
(Japan) K Yamashita	21	19	21

Fourth round
1	(Thailand) K Wangcharoen	21	21
(Japan) K Yamashita	16	18

==== Section 2 ====
First Round
(India) M Manjunath	18	17
(Indonesia) A R Dwicahyo	21	21

Second Round
8	(China) Sun FX	21	21
(Chinese Taipei) Chen S-c	8	14
(Philippines) S Padiz	wo
(Hong Kong) Ko SH
14	(Malaysia) Leong JH	21	21
(Macau) Pui PF	12	8
(South Korea) Kim M-j	21	21
(Indonesia) A R Dwicahyo	15	7

Third Round
8	(China) Sun FX	21	21
(Hong Kong) Ko SH	11	11
14	(Malaysia) Leong JH	15	21	21
(South Korea) Kim M-j	21	17	16

Fourth Round
8	(China) Sun FX	21	21
14	(Malaysia) Leong JH	10	17

==== Section 3 ====
First round
(Pakistan) S Jamil	4	7
(China) Weng HY	21	21

Second round
3	(Japan) K Watanabe	21	21
(Sri Lanka) S Gunatilleke	4	6
(Hong Kong) Chan YC
(Philippines) F Gabuelo	wo
15	(India) L Sen	21	21
(South Korea) Lee S-m	16	9
(Thailand) K Srihong	8	8
(China) Weng HY	21	21

Third round
3	(Japan) K Watanabe	16	21	21
(Hong Kong) Chan YC	21	10	16
15	(India) L Sen	21	21	21
(China) Weng HY	23	15	10

Fourth round
3	(Japan) K Watanabe	15	18
15	(India) L Sen	21	21

==== Section 4 ====
First round
(Malaysia) Tan JW	21	21
(Singapore) J Koh	19	16

Second round
6	(Thailand) K Laotrakul	21	21
(Vietnam) Nguyen DG	4	10
(Macau) Ao FL	10	2
(Chinese Taipei) Liang H-c	21	21
11	(Indonesia) R Zulkifli	21	21
(Kazakhstan) D Panarin	19	9
(Myanmar) Aung MH	14	14
(Malaysia) Tan JW	21	21

Third round
6	(Thailand) K Laotrakul	21	21
(Chinese Taipei) Liang H-c	19	11
11	(Indonesia) R Zulkifli	24	17	21
(Malaysia) Tan JW	22	21	11

Fourth round
6	(Thailand) K Laotrakul	21	21
11	(Indonesia) R Zulkifli	11	14

=== Bottom half ===
==== Section 5 ====
First round
(China) Gao ZZ	21	21
(Vietnam) Le DP	12	15

Second round
(China) Gao ZZ	21	21
(Sri Lanka) R Sasindu	9	8
(Japan) M Onodera	21	17	21
10	(Thailand) K Wanaroon	17	21	10
(India) K Mishra
(Mongolia) G Enkhjargal	wo
(Iran) A Jabbari	10	16
7	(Chinese Taipei) Lee C-h	21	21

Third round
(China) Gao ZZ	21	11	14
(Japan) M Onodera	15	21	21
(India) K Mishra	11	18
7	(Chinese Taipei) Lee C-h	21	21

Fourth round
(Japan) M Onodera	17	17
7	(Chinese Taipei) Lee C-h	21	21

==== Section 6 ====
First round
(Myanmar) Arkar PM	13	12
(Hong Kong) W Kwok	21	21

Second round
(Hong Kong) W Kwok	9	12
(South Korea) Byun J-s	21	21
(Singapore) Chuang JL	11	11
13	(Indonesia) C Dwi Wardoyo	21	21
(Macau) Lam HH	21	21
(Pakistan) Z Khalil	15	15
(Kazakhstan) I Yuldashev	7	8
4	(Malaysia) Lee ZJ	21	21

Third round
(South Korea) Byun J-s	22	21
13	(Indonesia) C Dwi Wardoyo	20	17
(Macau) Lam HH	4	9
4	(Malaysia) Lee ZJ	21	21

Fourth round
(South Korea) Byun J-s	9	17
4	(Malaysia) Lee ZJ	21	21

==== Section 7 ====
First round
(Mongolia) T Gombodorj	5	9
(Hong Kong) Chow HL	21	21

Second round
(Hong Kong) Chow HL	13	8
(Japan) T Obayashi	21	21
(Chinese Taipei) Chen C-t
16	(Philippines) M Alcala	wo
(South Korea) Park C-i	16	10
(Malaysia) Sim FH	21	21
(Pakistan) S Iftikhar	14	11
6	(Thailand) P Nipornram	21	21

Third round
(Japan) T Obayashi	15	11
(Chinese Taipei) Chen C-t	21	21
(Malaysia) Sim FH	22	15
6	(Thailand) P Nipornram	24	21

Fourth round
(Chinese Taipei) Chen C-t	10	22
6	(Thailand) P Nipornram	21	24

==== Section 8 ====
First round

Second round
(Singapore) M Tan	21	21
(Macau) Che PN	7	14
(China) Liu HC	21	21
12	(Thailand) K Imnark	13	7
(Sri Lanka) T Ambegoda	11	12
(Indonesia) G Cupu	21	21
(Myanmar) S Aung
2	(India) C Sen	wo

Third round
(Singapore) M Tan	5	6
(China) Liu HC	21	21
(Indonesia) G Cupu	21	21
(Myanmar) S Aung	10	11

Fourth round
(China) Liu HC	21	21
(Indonesia) G Cupu	11	11
