= 2024 China Open (badminton) =

Tournament details
- Dates: 17 – 22 September
- Level: Super 1000
- Total prize money: US$2,000,000
- Venue: Changzhou Olympic Sports Centre Xincheng Gymnasium
- Location: Changzhou, Jiangsu, China

Champions
- Men's singles: (China) Weng Hongyang
- Women's singles: (China) Wang Zhiyi
- Men's doubles: (Malaysia) Goh Sze Fei (Malaysia) Nur Izzuddin
- Women's doubles: (China) Li Yijing (China) Luo Xumin
- Mixed doubles: (China) Feng Yanzhe (China) Huang Dongping

The 2024 China Open (officially known as the Victor China Open 2024 for sponsorship reasons) was a badminton tournament which took place at Changzhou Olympic Sports Centre Xincheng Gymnasium in Changzhou, Jiangsu, China from 17 to 22 September 2024 and had a total prize of $2,000,000 which is the biggest prize money offer for season calendar except BWF World Tour Finals.

== Tournament ==
The 2024 China Open was the twenty-seventh tournament of the 2024 BWF World Tour and also part of the China Open championships, which had been held since 1986. This tournament was organized by Chinese Badminton Association, and sanctioned by the BWF.

=== Venue ===
This international tournament will be held at Changzhou Olympic Sports Centre Xincheng Gymnasium in Changzhou, Jiangsu, China.

=== Point distribution ===
Below is the tables with the point distribution for each phase of the tournament based on the new BWF points system for the BWF World Tour Super 1000 event starting in Week 17 2024.

| Winner | Runner-up | 3/4 | 5/8 | 9/16 | 17/32 |
|---|---|---|---|---|---|
| 13,500 | 11,500 | 9,500 | 7,400 | 5,400 | 3,300 |

=== Prize money ===
The total prize money for this year tournament was US$2,000,000. Distribution of prize money was in accordance with BWF regulations.

| Event | Winner | Finalist | Semi-finals | Quarter-finals | Last 16 | Last 32 |
| Singles | $140,000 | $68,000 | $28,000 | $11,000 | $6,000 | $2,000 |
| Doubles | $148,000 | $70,000 | $28,000 | $12,500 | $6,500 | $2,000 |

== Men's singles ==
=== Seeds ===
1. (China) Shi Yuqi (second round)
2. (Denmark) Viktor Axelsen (first round)
3. (Malaysia) Lee Zii Jia (first round)
4. (China) Li Shifeng (first round)
5. (Denmark) Anders Antonsen (quarter-finals)
6. (Japan) Kodai Naraoka (final)
7. (Indonesia) Jonatan Christie (semi-finals)
8. (Thailand) Kunlavut Vitidsarn (semi-finals)

=== Finals ===
Semi-finals
8 | (Thailand) Kunlavut Vitidsarn | 17 | 13
6 | (Japan) Kodai Naraoka | 21 | 21
(China) Weng Hongyang | 21 | 21
7 | (Indonesia) Jonatan Christie | 17 | 18

Final
6 | (Japan) Kodai Naraoka | 17 | 12
(China) Weng Hongyang | 21 | 21

=== Top half ===
==== Section 1 ====
First round
1 | (China) Shi YQ | 21 | 21
PFR | (Thailand) K Wangcharoen | 10 | 19
(Indonesia) C A Dwi Wardoyo | 18 | 17
(Indonesia) A S Ginting | 21 | 21
8 | (Thailand) K Vitidsarn | 20 | 21 | 21
(Chinese Taipei) Su L-y | 22 | 14 | 15
(India) P Rajawat | 13 | 16
(Canada) B Yang | 21 | 21

Second round
1 | (China) Shi YQ | 11 | 8
(Indonesia) A S Ginting | 21 | 21
8 | (Thailand) K Vitidsarn | 21 | 21
(Canada) B Yang | 18 | 9

Quarter-finals
(Indonesia) A S Ginting | 21 | 11 | 19
8 | (Thailand) K Vitidsarn | 10 | 21 | 21

==== Section 2 ====
First round
3 | (Malaysia) Lee Z J | 15 | 2
(Japan) K Watanabe | 21 | 21
(Chinese Taipei) Wang T-w | 21 | 12 | 21
(France) C Popov | 14 | 21 | 19
6 | (Japan) K Naraoka | 21 | 21
(Japan) T Obayashi | 14 | 11
(China) Lu GZ | 22 | 21 | 18
(Chinese Taipei) Lee C-h | 24 | 11 | 21

Second round
(Japan) K Watanabe | 14 | 21 | 21
(Chinese Taipei) Wang T-w | 21 | 12 | 10
6 | (Japan) K Naraoka | 15 | 21 | 21
(Chinese Taipei) Lee C-h | 21 | 10 | 13

Quarter-finals
(Japan) K Watanabe | 18 | 21 | 12
6 | (Japan) K Naraoka | 21 | 14 | 21

=== Bottom half ===
==== Section 3 ====
First round
(Japan) Y Tanaka | 17 | 21 | 12
(Singapore) Loh K Y | 21 | 17 | 21
(Hong Kong) Ng K L | 11 | 17
5 | (Denmark) A Antonsen | 21 | 21
(China) Weng HY | 21 | 21
(Hong Kong) Lee C Y | 13 | 19
(Chinese Taipei) Chou T-c | 21 | 21
4 | (China) Li SF | 17 | 18

Second round
(Singapore) Loh K Y | 12 | 21 | 18
5 | (Denmark) A Antonsen | 21 | 9 | 21
(China) Weng HY | 20 | 21 | 21
(Chinese Taipei) Chou T-c | 22 | 18 | 15

Quarter-finals
5 | (Denmark) A Antonsen | 21 | 19 | 21
(China) Weng HY | 19 | 21 | 23

==== Section 4 ====
First round
(France) T J Popov | 23 | 26 | 21
(Malaysia) Leong J H | 25 | 24 | 19
(Denmark) R Gemke | 20 | 18
7 | (Indonesia) J Christie | 22 | 21
(Japan) K Nishimoto | 4 | 21 | 23
(India) K George | 21 | 10 | 21
(China) Lei LX | 21 | 17 | 21
2 | (Denmark) V Axelsen | 19 | 21 | 16

Second round
(France) T J Popov | 21 | 18 | 20
7 | (Indonesia) J Christie | 16 | 21 | 22
(Japan) K Nishimoto | 8 | 17
(China) Lei LX | 21 | 21

Quarter-finals
7 | (Indonesia) J Christie | 21 | 21
(China) Lei LX | 18 | 12

== Women's singles ==
=== Seeds ===
1. (South Korea) An Se-young (withdrew)
2. (Chinese Taipei) Tai Tzu-ying (first round)
3. (China) Wang Zhiyi (champion)
4. (Japan) Akane Yamaguchi (semi-finals)
5. (Indonesia) Gregoria Mariska Tunjung (first round)
6. (China) Han Yue (first round)
7. (Japan) Aya Ohori (semi-finals)
8. (Thailand) Supanida Katethong (withdrew)

=== Finals ===
Semi-finals
3 | (China) Wang Zhiyi | 21 | 21
7 | (Japan) Aya Ohori | 15 | 18
4 | (Japan) Akane Yamaguchi | 20 | 15
(Japan) Tomoka Miyazaki | 22 | 21

Final
3 | (China) Wang Zhiyi | 21 | 21
(Japan) Tomoka Miyazaki | 17 | 15

=== Top half ===
==== Section 1 ====
First round
3 | (China) Wang ZY | 21 | 21
(Denmark) M Blichfeldt | 14 | 12
(United States) L Lam | 20 | 11
(China) Zhang YM | 22 | 21
6 | (China) Han Y | 15 | 18
(China) Gao FJ | 21 | 21
(Chinese Taipei) Sung S-y | 21 | 12 | 21
(Malaysia) Goh J W | 9 | 21 | 8

Second round
3 | (China) Wang ZY | 29 | 21
(China) Zhang YM | 27 | 11
(China) Gao FJ | 9 | 21 | 21
(Chinese Taipei) Sung S-y | 21 | 13 | 17

Quarter-finals
3 | (China) Wang ZY | 13 | 21 | 21
(China) Gao FJ | 21 | 11 | 14

==== Section 2 ====
First round
7 | (Japan) A Ohori | 21 | 21
(Thailand) R Intanon | 18 | 14
(Myanmar) Thet Htar T | 10 | 21 | 22
(Vietnam) Nguyễn T L | 21 | 18 | 24
SWM | (South Korea) Kim G-e | 15 | 15
(Thailand) P Chochuwong | 21 | 21
PFR | (Chinese Taipei) Liang T-y | 8 | 14
(Denmark) L Kjærsfeldt | 21 | 21

Second round
7 | (Japan) A Ohori | 21 | 21
(Vietnam) Nguyễn T L | 17 | 11
(Thailand) P Chochuwong | 21 | 20 | 21
(Denmark) L Kjærsfeldt | 13 | 22 | 14

Quarter-finals
7 | (Japan) A Ohori | 21 | 21
(Thailand) P Chochuwong | 15 | 16

=== Bottom half ===
==== Section 3 ====
First round
(India) Samiya I F | 9 | 7
(Scotland) K Gilmour | 21 | 21
(India) M Bansod | 26 | 21
5 | (Indonesia) G M Tunjung | 24 | 19
(India) A Kashyap | 15 | 19
(Chinese Taipei) Chiu P-c | 21 | 21
(Chinese Taipei) Pai Y-p | 16 | 6
4 | (Japan) A Yamaguchi | 21 | 21

Second round
(Scotland) K Gilmour | 17 | 21 | 16
(India) M Bansod | 21 | 19 | 21
(Chinese Taipei) Chiu P-c | 21 | 10 | 13
4 | (Japan) A Yamaguchi | 17 | 21 | 21

Quarter-finals
(India) M Bansod | 10 | 16
4 | (Japan) A Yamaguchi | 21 | 21

==== Section 4 ====
First round
(Singapore) Yeo J M | 21 | 21
(Canada) WY Zhang | 12 | 9
PFR | (Ukraine) P Buhrova | 23 | 6 | 9
SWM | (Thailand) B Ongbamrungphan | 21 | 21 | 21
(Japan) T Miyazaki | 16 | 21 | 21
PFR | (Thailand) L Chaiwan | 21 | 12 | 12
(Denmark) J D Jakobsen | 21 | 7 | 21
2 | (Chinese Taipei) Tai T-y | 14 | 21 | 19

Second round
(Singapore) Yeo J M | 21 | 21
SWM | (Thailand) B Ongbamrungphan | 16 | 17
(Japan) T Miyazaki | 21 | 21
(Denmark) J D Jakobsen | 15 | 15

Quarter-finals
(Singapore) Yeo J M | 18 | 6
(Japan) T Miyazaki | 21 | 21

== Men's doubles ==
=== Seeds ===
1. (China) Liang Weikeng / Wang Chang (second round)
2. (Denmark) Kim Astrup / Anders Skaarup Rasmussen (quarter-finals)
3. (South Korea) Kang Min-hyuk / Seo Seung-jae (second round)
4. (Indonesia) Fajar Alfian / Muhammad Rian Ardianto (quarter-finals)
5. (China) He Jiting / Ren Xiangyu (final)
6. (Chinese Taipei) Lee Jhe-huei / Yang Po-hsuan (first round)
7. (Malaysia) Goh Sze Fei / Nur Izzuddin (champions)
8. (Denmark) Rasmus Kjær / Frederik Søgaard (quarter-finals)

=== Finals ===
Semi-finals
(Indonesia) Muhammad Shohibul Fikri (Indonesia) Daniel Marthin | 14 | 22
7 | (Malaysia) Goh Sze Fei (Malaysia) Nur Izzuddin | 21 | 24
(Malaysia) Ong Yew Sin (Malaysia) Teo Ee Yi | 18 | 11
5 | (China) He Jiting (China) Ren Xiangyu | 21 | 21

Final
7 | (Malaysia) Goh Sze Fei (Malaysia) Nur Izzuddin | 13 | 21 | 21
5 | (China) He Jiting (China) Ren Xiangyu | 21 | 12 | 17

=== Top half ===
==== Section 1 ====
First round
1 | (China) Liang WK (China) Wang C | 22 | 21
(France) C Popov (France) T J Popov | 20 | 16
(Chinese Taipei) Chiu H-c (Chinese Taipei) Wang C-l | 13 | 13
(Indonesia) M S Fikri (Indonesia) D Marthin | 21 | 21
8 | (Denmark) R Kjær (Denmark) F Søgaard | 24 | 21
(Chinese Taipei) Lin B-w (Chinese Taipei) Su C-h | 22 | 16
(Malaysia) Low H Y (Malaysia) Ng E C | 21 | 19 | 15
(England) B Lane (England) S Vendy | 18 | 21 | 21

Second round
1 | (China) Liang WK (China) Wang C | 19 | 21 | 17
(Indonesia) M S Fikri (Indonesia) D Marthin | 21 | 18 | 21
8 | (Denmark) R Kjær (Denmark) F Søgaard | 21 | 21
(England) B Lane (England) S Vendy | 16 | 18

Quarter-finals
(Indonesia) M S Fikri (Indonesia) D Marthin | 21 | 21
8 | (Denmark) R Kjær (Denmark) F Søgaard | 19 | 19

==== Section 2 ====
First round
3 | (South Korea) Kang M-h (South Korea) Seo S-j | 21 | 21
(Malaysia) Choong H J (Malaysia) M Haikal | 10 | 18
(Malaysia) Man W C (Malaysia) Tee K W | 21 | 21
(China) Xie HN (China) Zeng WH | 17 | 19
7 | (Malaysia) Goh S F (Malaysia) N Izzuddin | 17 | 21 | 21
(China) Chen BY (China) Liu Y | 21 | 12 | 19
(United States) Chen Z-y (United States) P Smith | 11 | 12
(Malaysia) J Arif (Malaysia) Yap R K | 21 | 21

Second round
3 | (South Korea) Kang M-h (South Korea) Seo S-j | 18 | 19
(Malaysia) Man W C (Malaysia) Tee K W | 21 | 21
7 | (Malaysia) Goh S F (Malaysia) N Izzuddin | 21 | 25
(Malaysia) J Arif (Malaysia) Yap R K | 14 | 23

Quarter-finals
(Malaysia) Man W C (Malaysia) Tee K W | 19 | 18
7 | (Malaysia) Goh S F (Malaysia) N Izzuddin | 21 | 21

=== Bottom half ===
==== Section 3 ====
First round
(Indonesia) S K Gutama (Indonesia) M R Isfahani | 16 | 16
(Chinese Taipei) Lee F-c (Chinese Taipei) Lee F-j | 21 | 21
(Malaysia) Ong Y S (Malaysia) Teo E Y | 13 | 21 | 21
6 | (Chinese Taipei) Lee J-h (Chinese Taipei) Yang P-hs | 21 | 16 | 15
(Thailand) S Jomkoh (Thailand) K Kedren | 16 | 11
(Denmark) A Søndergaard (Denmark) J Toft | 21 | 21
(South Korea) Choi S-g (South Korea) Heo K-h | 11 | 14
4 | (Indonesia) F Alfian (Indonesia) M R Ardianto | 21 | 21

Second round
(Chinese Taipei) Lee F-c (Chinese Taipei) Lee F-j | 19 | 14
(Malaysia) Ong Y S (Malaysia) Teo E Y | 21 | 21
(Denmark) A Søndergaard (Denmark) J Toft | 15 | 8
4 | (Indonesia) F Alfian (Indonesia) M R Ardianto | 21 | 21

Quarter-finals
(Malaysia) Ong Y S (Malaysia) Teo E Y | 14 | 21 | 21
4 | (Indonesia) F Alfian (Indonesia) M R Ardianto | 21 | 17 | 14

==== Section 4 ====
First round
(Denmark) D Lundgaard (Denmark) M Vestergaard | 21 | 21
(Thailand) P Thongkham (Thailand) W Thongkham | 16 | 10
(Thailand) P Sukphun (Thailand) P Teeraratsakul | 11 | 12
5 | (China) He JT (China) Ren XY | 21 | 21
(Indonesia) L R Carnando (Indonesia) B Maulana | 21 | 21
(Japan) K Mitsuhashi (Japan) H Okamura | 13 | 14
(Indonesia) M Ahsan (Indonesia) H Setiawan | 18 | 19
2 | (Denmark) K Astrup (Denmark) A S Rasmussen | 21 | 21

Second round
(Denmark) D Lundgaard (Denmark) M Vestergaard | 11 | 16
5 | (China) He JT (China) Ren XY | 21 | 21
(Indonesia) L R Carnando (Indonesia) B Maulana | 18 | 24 | 18
2 | (Denmark) K Astrup (Denmark) A S Rasmussen | 21 | 22 | 21

Quarter-finals
5 | (China) He JT (China) Ren XY | 21 | 11 | 21
2 | (Denmark) K Astrup (Denmark) A S Rasmussen | 12 | 21 | 19

== Women's doubles ==
=== Seeds ===
1. (South Korea) Baek Ha-na / Lee So-hee (quarter-finals)
2. (China) Liu Shengshu / Tan Ning (quarter-finals)
3. (Japan) Nami Matsuyama / Chiharu Shida (second round)
4. (Japan) Rin Iwanaga / Kie Nakanishi (second round)
5. (China) Jia Yifan / Zheng Yu (semi-finals)
6. (Malaysia) Pearly Tan / Thinaah Muralitharan (second round)
7. (South Korea) Kim So-yeong / Kong Hee-yong (second round)
8. (South Korea) Jeong Na-eun / Kim Hye-jeong (semi-finals)

=== Finals ===
Semi-finals
(China) Li Wenmei (China) Zhang Shuxian | 21 | 22
5 | (China) Jia Yifan (China) Zheng Yu | 17 | 20
8 | (South Korea) Jeong Na-eun (South Korea) Kim Hye-jeong | 12 | 14
(China) Li Yijing (China) Luo Xumin | 21 | 21

Final
(China) Li Wenmei (China) Zhang Shuxian | 21 | 18 | 8
(China) Li Yijing (China) Luo Xumin | 11 | 21 | 21

=== Top half ===
==== Section 1 ====
First round
(Canada) J Cheung (Canada) C Choi | 11 | 13
(Ukraine) P Buhrova (Ukraine) Y Kantemyr | 21 | 21
(China) Li WM (China) Zhang SX | 21 | 21
(Chinese Taipei) Chang C-h (Chinese Taipei) Yang C-t | 17 | 9

Second round
1 | (South Korea) Baek H-n (South Korea) Lee S-h | 21 | 21
(Ukraine) P Buhrova (Ukraine) Y Kantemyr | 14 | 11
7 | (South Korea) Kim S-y (South Korea) Kong H-y | 20 | 16
(China) Li WM (China) Zhang SX | 22 | 21

Quarter-finals
1 | (South Korea) Baek H-n (South Korea) Lee S-h | 18 | 18
(China) Li WM (China) Zhang SX | 21 | 21

==== Section 2 ====
First round
(South Korea) Lee Y-l (South Korea) Shin S-c | 21 | 13 | 21
(Thailand) O Jongsathapornparn (Thailand) S Suwachai | 13 | 21 | 19
(Chinese Taipei) Sung S-y (Chinese Taipei) Yu C-h | 21 | 21
(Denmark) J Finne-Ipsen (Denmark) M Surrow | 5 | 15

Second round
4 | (Japan) R Iwanaga (Japan) K Nakanishi | 17 | 20
(South Korea) Lee Y-l (South Korea) Shin S-c | 21 | 22
5 | (China) Jia YF (China) Zheng Y | 21 | 22
(Chinese Taipei) Sung S-y (Chinese Taipei) Yu C-h | 9 | 20

Quarter-finals
(South Korea) Lee Y-l (South Korea) Shin S-c | 11 | 14
5 | (China) Jia YF (China) Zheng Y | 21 | 21

=== Bottom half ===
==== Section 3 ====
First round
(India) T Jolly (India) G Gopichand | 21 | 15 | 17
(Chinese Taipei) Hsieh P-s (Chinese Taipei) Hung E-t | 16 | 21 | 21
(Chinese Taipei) Teng C-h (Chinese Taipei) Yang C-y | 21 | 16 | 21
(India) R Panda (India) S Panda | 11 | 21 | 11

Second round
(Chinese Taipei) Hsieh P-s (Chinese Taipei) Hung E-t | 8 | 12
8 | (South Korea) Jeong N-e (South Korea) Kim H-j | 21 | 21
(Chinese Taipei) Teng C-h (Chinese Taipei) Yang C-y | 21 | 16 | 21
3 | (Japan) N Matsuyama (Japan) C Shida | 19 | 21 | 19

Quarter-finals
8 | (South Korea) Jeong N-e (South Korea) Kim H-j | 21 | 21
(Chinese Taipei) Teng C-h (Chinese Taipei) Yang C-y | 18 | 19

==== Section 4 ====
First round
(China) Li YJ (China) Luo XM | w | / | o
(Thailand) L Kanlaha (Thailand) P Muenwong
(Chinese Taipei) Hsu Y-h (Chinese Taipei) Lin J-y | 15 | 7
(Hong Kong) Yeung N T (Hong Kong) Yeung P L | 21 | 21

Second round
(China) Li YJ (China) Luo XM | 21 | 21
6 | (Malaysia) P Tan (Malaysia) Thinaah M | 16 | 18
(Hong Kong) Yeung N T (Hong Kong) Yeung P L | 18 | 12
2 | (China) Liu SS (China) Tan N | 21 | 21

Quarter-finals
(China) Li YJ (China) Luo XM | 14 | 21 | 21
2 | (China) Liu SS (China) Tan N | 21 | 15 | 18

== Mixed doubles ==
=== Seeds ===
1. (China) Zheng Siwei / Huang Yaqiong (withdrew)
2. (China) Feng Yanzhe / Huang Dongping (champions)
3. (China) Jiang Zhenbang / Wei Yaxin (quarter-finals)
4. (South Korea) Seo Seung-jae / Chae Yoo-jung (withdrew)
5. (Japan) Yuta Watanabe / Arisa Higashino (withdrew)
6. (South Korea) Kim Won-ho / Jeong Na-eun (withdrew)
7. (Hong Kong) Tang Chun Man / Tse Ying Suet (second round)
8. (Thailand) Dechapol Puavaranukroh / Sapsiree Taerattanachai (withdrew)

=== Finals ===
Semi-finals
SWM | (Malaysia) Goh Soon Huat (Malaysia) Shevon Jemie Lai | 21 | 21
(China) Cheng Xing (China) Zhang Chi | 18 | 18
(Indonesia) Dejan Ferdinansyah (Indonesia) Gloria Emanuelle Widjaja | 16 | 15
2 | (China) Feng Yanzhe (China) Huang Dongping | 21 | 21

Final
SWM | (Malaysia) Goh Soon Huat (Malaysia) Shevon Jemie Lai | 21 | 14 | 17
2 | (China) Feng Yanzhe (China) Huang Dongping | 16 | 21 | 21

=== Top half ===
==== Section 1 ====
First round
3 | (China) Jiang ZB (China) Wei YX | 21 | 21
(Chinese Taipei) Chiu H-c (Chinese Taipei) Lin J-y | 19 | 13
SWM | (Malaysia) Goh S H (Malaysia) S J Lai | 21 | 21
(Singapore) T Hee (Singapore) J Tan | 13 | 15

Second round
3 | (China) Jiang ZB (China) Wei YX | w | / | o
SWM | (Malaysia) Goh S H (Malaysia) S J Lai | 21 | 21
(Thailand) S Jomkoh (Thailand) S Paewsampran | 16 | 12

Quarter-finals
3 | (China) Jiang ZB (China) Wei YX | 21 | 16
SWM | (Malaysia) Goh S H (Malaysia) S J Lai | 23 | 21

==== Section 2 ====
First round
(Chinese Taipei) Ye H-w (Chinese Taipei) Lee C-h
(Japan) H Midorikawa (Japan) N Saito | w | / | o
SWM | (China) Guo XW (China) Chen FH | 22 | 19 | 17
(Denmark) M Vestergaard (Denmark) C Busch | 20 | 21 | 21
(China) Cheng X (China) Zhang C | 21 | 21
(Ukraine) O Titov (Ukraine) Y Kantemyr | 13 | 11

Second round
7 | (Hong Kong) Tang C M (Hong Kong) Tse Y S | 21 | 19 | 16
(Japan) H Midorikawa (Japan) N Saito | 10 | 21 | 21
(Denmark) M Vestergaard (Denmark) C Busch | 20 | 21 | 9
(China) Cheng X (China) Zhang C | 22 | 19 | 21

Quarter-finals
(Japan) H Midorikawa (Japan) N Saito | 15 | 19
(China) Cheng X (China) Zhang C | 21 | 21

=== Bottom half ===
==== Section 3 ====
First round
(Malaysia) Hoo P R (Malaysia) Cheng S Y | 21 | 21
SWM | (Chinese Taipei) Yang P-hs (Chinese Taipei) Hu L-f | 17 | 16
(Hong Kong) Lee C H (Hong Kong) Ng T Y | 7 | 3^{r}
(Indonesia) D Ferdinansyah (Indonesia) G E Widjaja | 21 | 11
(India) S K Karunakaran (India) A Variyath | 14 | 11
SWM | (Malaysia) Chen T J (Malaysia) Toh E W | 21 | 21

Second round
(Malaysia) Yap R K (Malaysia) V Siow | 9 | 15
(Malaysia) Hoo P R (Malaysia) Cheng S Y | 21 | 21
(Indonesia) D Ferdinansyah (Indonesia) G E Widjaja | 21 | 13 | 21
SWM | (Malaysia) Chen T J (Malaysia) Toh E W | 15 | 21 | 9

Quarter-finals
(Malaysia) Hoo P R (Malaysia) Cheng S Y | 14 | 9
(Indonesia) D Ferdinansyah (Indonesia) G E Widjaja | 21 | 21

==== Section 4 ====
First round
(Malaysia) Tan K M (Malaysia) Lai P J | 21 | 21
(India) B S Reddy (India) N S Reddy | 10 | 16
(Chinese Taipei) Wu H-y (Chinese Taipei) Yang C-y | 21 | 20 | 16
SWM | (Denmark) J Toft (Denmark) A Magelund | 14 | 22 | 21
(Chinese Taipei) Wang C-l (Chinese Taipei) Hsu Y-h | w | / | o
(Thailand) P Teeraratsakul (Thailand) P Muenwong
(Chinese Taipei) Lin B-w (Chinese Taipei) Lin C-c | 18 | 10
2 | (China) Feng YZ (China) Huang DP | 21 | 21

Second round
(Malaysia) Tan K M (Malaysia) Lai P J | 18 | 18
SWM | (Denmark) J Toft (Denmark) A Magelund | 21 | 21
(Chinese Taipei) Wang C-l (Chinese Taipei) Hsu Y-h | 12 | 10
2 | (China) Feng YZ (China) Huang DP | 21 | 21

Quarter-finals
SWM | (Denmark) J Toft (Denmark) A Magelund | 10 | 10
2 | (China) Feng YZ (China) Huang DP | 21 | 21

| Preceded by 2024 Hong Kong Open; 2024 Vietnam Open | BWF World Tour; 2024 BWF season | Succeeded by 2024 Macau Open |
