= 2018 Scottish Open (badminton) =

Tournament details
- Dates: 21–25 November
- Level: Super 100
- Total prize money: US$75,000
- Venue: Emirates Arena
- Location: Glasgow, Scotland

Champions
- Men's singles: (China) Liu Haichao
- Women's singles: (Scotland) Kirsty Gilmour
- Men's doubles: (England) Marcus Ellis (England) Chris Langridge
- Women's doubles: (Bulgaria) Gabriela Stoeva (Bulgaria) Stefani Stoeva
- Mixed doubles: (England) Marcus Ellis (England) Lauren Smith

The 2018 Scottish Open was a badminton tournament that took place at the Emirates Arena in Scotland from 21 to 25 November 2018 and had a total prize of $75,000.

== Tournament ==
The 2018 Scottish Open was the eleventh Super 100 tournament of the 2018 BWF World Tour and also part of the Scottish Open championships, which had been held since 1907. This was the last tournament to be counted for the 2018 BWF World Tour Finals. This tournament was organized by BadmintonScotland and sanctioned by the BWF.

=== Venue ===
This international tournament was held at the Emirates Arena in Glasgow, Scotland.

=== Point distribution ===
Below is the point distribution table for each phase of the tournament based on the BWF points system for the BWF Tour Super 100 event.

Winner	Runner-up	3/4	5/8	9/16	17/32	33/64	65/128	129/256
5,500	4,680	3,850	3,030	2,110	1,290	510	240	100

=== Prize money ===
The total prize money for this tournament was US$75,000. Distribution of prize money was in accordance with BWF regulations.

Event	Winner	Finals	Semi-finals	Quarter-finals	Last 16
Singles	$5,625	$2,850	$1,087.50	$450	$262.50
Doubles	$5,925	$2,850	$1,050	$543.75	$281.25

== Men's singles ==
=== Seeds ===
1. (Denmark) Rasmus Gemke (withdrew)
2. (France) Brice Leverdez (third round)
3. (Netherlands) Mark Caljouw (semi-finals)
4. (England) Rajiv Ouseph (semi-finals)
5. (France) Lucas Corvée (quarter-finals)
6. (England) Toby Penty (third round)
7. (Spain) Pablo Abián (second round)
8. (Denmark) Victor Svendsen (quarter-finals)

=== Wild card ===
BadmintonScotland awarded a wild card entry to Matthew Carder of Scotland.

=== Finals ===
Semi-finals
(China) Sun Feixiang	21	17	21
3	(Netherlands) Mark Caljouw	14	21	19
4	(England) Rajiv Ouseph	21	8	19
Q7	(China) Liu Haichao	13	21	21

Final
(China) Sun Feixiang	17	20
Q7	(China) Liu Haichao	21	22

=== Top half ===
==== Section 1 ====
First Round
(Hungary) G Krausz	14	14
(Finland) K Koljonen	21	21
PFQ	(Denmark) S Toft Hansen	21	19	16
(France) T J Popov	19	21	21
PFQ	(Germany) M Weißkirchen	21	16	15
(Denmark) R Messerschmidt	17	21	21
WC	(Scotland) M Carder	9	9
(Austria) L Wraber	21	21

Second Round
PFQ	(Switzerland) C Kirchmayr	7	12
(Finland) K Koljonen	21	21
(China) Sun FX	21	21
(France) T J Popov	15	10
8	(Denmark) V Svendsen	21	22	21
(Denmark) R Messerschmidt	19	24	18
(Germany) A Roovers	21	22	15
(Austria) L Wraber	18	24	21

Third Round
(Finland) K Koljonen	10	15
(China) Sun FX	21	21
8	(Denmark) V Svendsen	21	21
(Austria) L Wraber	13	19

Quarter-finals
(China) Sun FX	21	21	21
8	(Denmark) V Svendsen	23	14	10

==== Section 2 ====
First Round
(Finland) E Heino	21	21
(Germany) L Schänzler	13	10
(Republic of Ireland) J Magee	21	13	15
(Germany) K Schäfer	19	21	21
(India) K R Rajarajan	13	17
(Italy) R Maddaloni	21	21
(Republic of Ireland) N Nguyen	21	21
(Sweden) J Nilsson	15	14

Second Round
3	(Netherlands) M Caljouw	21	21
(Finland) E Heino	14	11
Q5	(France) C Popov	21	11	20
(Germany) K Schäfer	17	21	22
6	(England) T Penty	w	/	o
(Italy) R Maddaloni
(France) T Rouxel	21	14	21
(Republic of Ireland) N Nguyen	16	21	19

Third Round
3	(Netherlands) M Caljouw	21	21
(Germany) K Schäfer	16	7
6	(England) T Penty	11	19
(France) T Rouxel	21	21

Quarter-finals
3	(Netherlands) M Caljouw	21	21
(France) T Rouxel	7	9

=== Bottom half ===
==== Section 3 ====
First Round
Q3	(England) D Jones	21	21
(New Zealand) A Manota	19	15
Q2	(England) J Torjussen	6	19
Q6	(China) Weng HY	21	21
(Italy) F Caponio	17	13
(Denmark) K Bruun	21	21
(Bulgaria) I Rusev	21	21
Q1	(Czech Republic) L Zevl	16	14

Second Round
Q3	(England) D Jones	10	18
Q8	(England) A Lane	21	21
Q6	(China) Weng HY	21	12	14
5	(France) L Corvée	18	21	21
(Denmark) K Bruun	21	21
(Portugal) D N Anjo	10	12
(Bulgaria) I Rusev	15	12
4	(England) R Ouseph	21	21

Third Round
Q8	(England) A Lane	22	14	14
5	(France) L Corvée	20	21	21
(Denmark) K Bruun	18	13
4	(England) R Ouseph	21	21

Quarter-finals
5	(France) L Corvée	21	14	15
4	(England) R Ouseph	17	21	21

==== Section 4 ====
First Round
(Singapore) Loh K Y	21	13	14
(Canada) J Ho-Shue	18	21	21
(Portugal) B Atilano	17	5
Q7	(China) Liu HC	21	21
(France) L Claerbout	21	21
(Luxembourg) R Mann	14	10
(Croatia) Z Đurkinjak	21	16	22
Q4	(England) E Rose	12	21	20

Second Round
(Canada) J Ho-Shue	20	15
(Netherlands) N Fransman	22	21
Q7	(China) Liu HC	21	21
7	(Spain) P Abián	8	9
(France) L Claerbout	21	21
PFQ	(Moldova) C Savin	9	17
(Croatia) Z Đurkinjak	17	8^{r}
2	(France) B Leverdez	21	16

Third Round
(Netherlands) N Fransman	21	12	17
Q7	(China) Liu HC	17	21	21
(France) L Claerbout	15	21	21
2	(France) B Leverdez	21	12	16

Quarter-finals
Q7	(China) Liu HC	21	17	21
(France) L Claerbout	14	21	15

== Women's singles ==
=== Seeds ===
1. (China) Cai Yanyan (semi-finals)
2. (Denmark) Line Kjærsfeldt (final)
3. (Scotland) Kirsty Gilmour (champion)
4. (China) Chen Xiaoxin (semi-finals)
5. (Spain) Beatriz Corrales (withdrew)
6. (Canada) Rachel Honderich (second round)
7. (Bulgaria) Linda Zetchiri (withdrew)
8. (Germany) Yvonne Li (first round)

=== Finals ===
Semi-finals
1	(China) Cai Yanyan	21	18	11
3	(Scotland) Kirsty Gilmour	19	21	21
4	(China) Chen Xiaoxin	11	21	18
2	(Denmark) Line Kjærsfeldt	21	10	21

Final
3	(Scotland) Kirsty Gilmour	21	18	21
2	(Denmark) Line Kjærsfeldt	16	21	18

=== Top half ===
==== Section 1 ====
First Round
1	(China) Cai YY	21	19	21
Q4	(China) Ji ST	16	21	12
(Wales) J Hart	9	8
(Denmark) J D Jakobsen	21	21
PFQ	(Portugal) S Gonçalves	14	18
(Denmark) M Skødstrup	21	21
(Belgium) L Tan	21	21
(Czech Republic) K Tomalová	15	9

Second Round
1	(China) Cai YY	21	21
(Denmark) J D Jakobsen	17	17
(Denmark) M Skødstrup	21	22
(Belgium) L Tan	13	20

Quarter-finals
1	(China) Cai YY	21	21
(Denmark) M Skødstrup	15	15

==== Section 2 ====
First Round
3	(Scotland) K Gilmour	21	21
(England) G Bland	8	12
(Denmark) M Poulsen	21	22
(United States) J Gai	10	20
6	(Canada) R Honderich	21	0
PFQ	(Chinese Taipei) Chang Y-l	10	0^{r}
(Denmark) A Hertz	18	21	15
(Switzerland) S Jaquet	21	14	21

Second Round
3	(Scotland) K Gilmour	21	21
(Denmark) M Poulsen	6	18
6	(Canada) R Honderich	18	18
(Switzerland) S Jaquet	21	21

Quarter-finals
3	(Scotland) K Gilmour	w	/	o
(Switzerland) S Jaquet

=== Bottom half ===
==== Section 3 ====
First Round
Q2	(Republic of Ireland) S Boyle	14	11
(Finland) A Mikkelä	21	21
(Singapore) Yeo J M	11	21	21
8	(Germany) Y Li	21	15	17
(England) C Birch	17	23	23
Q3	(India) T Lad	21	21	21
Q1	(England) A Holden	8	9
4	(China) Chen XX	21	21

Second Round
(Finland) A Mikkelä	12	12
(Singapore) Yeo J M	21	21
(England) C Birch	16	10
4	(China) Chen XX	21	21

Quarter-finals
(Singapore) Yeo J M	21	19
4	(China) Chen XX	23	21

==== Section 4 ====
First Round
(Netherlands) S de Visch Eijbergen	21	17	21
PFQ	(Estonia) G Saar	13	21	7
(Slovakia) M Repiská	21	15	21
PFQ	(Hungary) Á Körösi	19	21	13
(Bulgaria) M Mitsova	21	18	22
(Estonia) K Kuuba	19	21	24
(Germany) F Deprez	10	19
2	(Denmark) L Kjærsfeldt	21	21

Second Round
(Netherlands) S de Visch Eijbergen	21	21
(Slovakia) M Repiská	15	12
(Estonia) K Kuuba	15	10
2	(Denmark) L Kjærsfeldt	21	21

Quarter-finals
(Netherlands) S de Visch Eijbergen	13	16
2	(Denmark) L Kjærsfeldt	21	21

== Men's doubles ==
=== Seeds ===
1. (England) Marcus Ellis / Chris Langridge (champions)
2. (Netherlands) Jelle Maas / Robin Tabeling (first round)
3. (Germany) Mark Lamsfuß / Marvin Seidel (semi-finals)
4. (Canada) Jason Ho-shue / Nyl Yakura (first round)
5. (Germany) Jones Ralfy Jansen / Josche Zurwonne (withdrew)
6. (Netherlands) Jacco Arends / Ruben Jille (quarter-finals)
7. (England) Ben Lane / Sean Vendy (semi-finals)
8. (Denmark) David Daugaard / Frederik Søgaard (final)

=== Finals ===
Semi-finals
1	(England) Marcus Ellis (England) Chris Langridge	23	21	25
7	(England) Ben Lane (England) Sean Vendy	25	11	23
3	(Germany) Mark Lamsfuß (Germany) Marvin Seidel
8	(Denmark) David Daugaard (Denmark) Frederik Søgaard	w	/	o

Final
1	(England) Marcus Ellis (England) Chris Langridge	23	21
8	(Denmark) David Daugaard (Denmark) Frederik Søgaard	21	16

=== Top half ===
==== Section 1 ====
First Round
1	(England) M Ellis (England) C Langridge	21	21
(Scotland) J MacGregor (Scotland) C Pringle	6	12
(Denmark) M E Christensen (Denmark) K Knudsen	21	20	10
(England) C Hemming (England) T Wolfenden	18	22	21
PFQ	(Bulgaria) A Vlaar (Bulgaria) D Yanakiev	19	19
(Republic of Ireland) J Magee (Republic of Ireland) P Reynolds	21	21
(Sweden) R Eidestedt (Germany) P Käsbauer	21	21
(Scotland) C Grimley (Scotland) M Grimley	18	15

Second Round
1	(England) M Ellis (England) C Langridge	21	19	21
(England) C Hemming (England) T Wolfenden	15	21	6
(Republic of Ireland) J Magee (Republic of Ireland) P Reynolds	9	22	10
(Sweden) R Eidestedt (Germany) P Käsbauer	21	20	21

Quarter-finals
1	(England) M Ellis (England) C Langridge	21	21
(Sweden) R Eidestedt (Germany) P Käsbauer	4	18

==== Section 2 ====
First Round
4	(Canada) J Ho-Shue (Canada) N Yakura	17	17
(New Zealand) O Leydon-Davis (New Zealand) A Manota	21	21
Q2	(China) Chen SH (China) Fan QY	18	15
(France) T Gicquel (France) R Labar	21	21
7	(England) B Lane (England) S Vendy	21	21
Q1	(Sweden) A Gozzi (Sweden) M Z-Bexell	10	12
(England) M Clare (England) M Flynn	16	14
PFQ	(France) L Corvée (France) B Kersaudy	21	21

Second Round
(New Zealand) O Leydon-Davis (New Zealand) A Manota	19	13
(France) T Gicquel (France) R Labar	21	21
7	(England) B Lane (England) S Vendy	21	21
PFQ	(France) L Corvée (France) B Kersaudy	14	16

Quarter-finals
(France) T Gicquel (France) R Labar	20	22	13
7	(England) B Lane (England) S Vendy	22	20	21

=== Bottom half ===
==== Section 3 ====
First Round
(Russia) K Abramov (Russia) A Zinchenko	11	17
(Scotland) A Dunn (Scotland) A Hall	21	21
(Denmark) J Bay (Denmark) M Mikkelsen	16	11
6	(Netherlands) J Arends (Netherlands) R Jille	21	21
PFQ	(England) Z Russ (England) S Stallwood	17	21	18
(Germany) B Geiss (Germany) J C Völker	21	19	21
(England) S Parsons (England) M Roe	10	13
3	(Germany) M Lamsfuß (Germany) M Seidel	21	21

Second Round
(Scotland) A Dunn (Scotland) A Hall	12	21	14
6	(Netherlands) J Arends (Netherlands) R Jille	21	19	21
(Germany) B Geiss (Germany) J C Völker	15	7
3	(Germany) M Lamsfuß (Germany) M Seidel	21	21

Quarter-finals
6	(Netherlands) J Arends (Netherlands) R Jille	23	21	19
3	(Germany) M Lamsfuß (Germany) M Seidel	21	23	21

==== Section 4 ====
First Round
(Denmark) M Bay-Smidt (Denmark) L Mølhede	21	21
(United States) V Chiu (United States) C Kan	16	11
(Czech Republic) J Janáček (Czech Republic) T Švejda	14	6
8	(Denmark) D Daugaard (Denmark) F Søgaard	21	21
Q4	(England) R Golding (England) B Yap	16	10
(France) C Popov (France) T J Popov	21	21
Q3	(England) P Briggs (England) G Mairs	21	21
2	(Netherlands) J Maas (Netherlands) R Tabeling	17	19

Second Round
(Denmark) M Bay-Smidt (Denmark) L Mølhede	22	15	17
8	(Denmark) D Daugaard (Denmark) F Søgaard	20	21	21
(France) C Popov (France) T J Popov	22	12
Q3	(England) P Briggs (England) G Mairs	24	21

Quarter-finals
8	(Denmark) D Daugaard (Denmark) F Søgaard	21	21
Q3	(England) P Briggs (England) G Mairs	18	12

== Women's doubles ==
=== Seeds ===
1. (Bulgaria) Gabriela Stoeva / Stefani Stoeva (champions)
2. (Netherlands) Selena Piek / Cheryl Seinen (semi-finals)
3. (France) Émilie Lefel / Anne Tran (final)
4. (France) Delphine Delrue / Léa Palermo (semi-finals)
5. (Germany) Johanna Goliszewski / Lara Käpplein (quarter-finals)
6. (Canada) Rachel Honderich / Kristen Tsai (quarter-finals)
7. (England) Chloe Birch / Lauren Smith (quarter-finals)
8. (Sweden) Emma Karlsson / Johanna Magnusson (quarter-finals)

=== Finals ===
Semi-finals
1	(Bulgaria) Gabriela Stoeva (Bulgaria) Stefani Stoeva	21	21
4	(France) Delphine Delrue (France) Léa Palermo	18	17
3	(France) Émilie Lefel (France) Anne Tran	21	21
2	(Netherlands) Selena Piek (Netherlands) Cheryl Seinen	17	15

Final
1	(Bulgaria) Gabriela Stoeva (Bulgaria) Stefani Stoeva	21	21
3	(France) Émilie Lefel (France) Anne Tran	16	9

=== Top half ===
==== Section 1 ====
First Round
1	(Bulgaria) G Stoeva (Bulgaria) S Stoeva	21	21
(Germany) L Kaminski (Germany) H Pohl	8	12
(Portugal) A F. Gonçalves (Portugal) S Gonçalves	7	14
(England) J Hopton (England) V Williams	21	21
7	(England) C Birch (England) L Smith	21	23
Q4	(Germany) E Janssens (Germany) K Ostermeyer	11	21
Q1	(United States) B Chi (United States) A Zhang	12	8
(China) Cao TW (China) Yan CX	21	21

Second Round
1	(Bulgaria) G Stoeva (Bulgaria) S Stoeva	21	21
(England) J Hopton (England) V Williams	14	7
7	(England) C Birch (England) L Smith	21	21
(China) Cao TW (China) Yan CX	18	13

Quarter-finals
1	(Bulgaria) G Stoeva (Bulgaria) S Stoeva	21	21
7	(England) C Birch (England) L Smith	18	11

==== Section 2 ====
First Round
4	(France) D Delrue (France) L Palermo	11
(Republic of Ireland) S Boyle (Republic of Ireland) R Darragh	2^{r}
(Netherlands) D Jille (Netherlands) I van der Aar	21	16	13
(Denmark) A Bøje (Denmark) S Lundgaard	16	21	21
5	(Germany) J Goliszewski (Germany) L Käpplein	21	21
(Sweden) C Nistad (Sweden) T Sjöö	16	8
(Denmark) J Finne-Ipsen (Denmark) R Søby Hansen	21	21
(Hungary) N Bukoviczki (Hungary) D Gonda	15	13

Second Round
4	(France) D Delrue (France) L Palermo	21	21
(Denmark) A Bøje (Denmark) S Lundgaard	11	13
5	(Germany) J Goliszewski (Germany) L Käpplein	19	21	21
(Denmark) J Finne-Ipsen (Denmark) R Søby Hansen	21	15	18

Quarter-finals
4	(France) D Delrue (France) L Palermo	21	21
5	(Germany) J Goliszewski (Germany) L Käpplein	13	15

=== Bottom half ===
==== Section 3 ====
First Round
(England) S Kelly (England) E Robinson	9	11
(Germany) L Efler (Germany) I Herttrich	21	21
(Estonia) K-K Marran (Estonia) H Rüütel	15	13
6	(Canada) R Honderich (Canada) K Tsai	21	21
(Germany) A Jäger (Germany) S S Küspert	21	21
(England) S Males (England) T'S Shaw	19	6
(England) J Moore (England) H Warner	21	11	14
3	(France) É Lefel (France) A Tran	13	21	21

Second Round
(Germany) L Efler (Germany) I Herttrich	21	26	15
6	(Canada) R Honderich (Canada) K Tsai	15	28	21
(Germany) A Jäger (Germany) S S Küspert	10	14
3	(France) É Lefel (France) A Tran	21	21

Quarter-finals
6	(Canada) R Honderich (Canada) K Tsai	19	17
3	(France) É Lefel (France) A Tran	21	21

==== Section 4 ====
First Round
Q3	(Scotland) L Middleton (Scotland) S Sidebottom	21	21
(Republic of Ireland) K Frost (Republic of Ireland) M Ryan	17	14
Q2	(Scotland) J MacPherson (Scotland) H Newall	15	6
8	(Sweden) E Karlsson (Sweden) J Magnusson	21	21
(England) E Burbidge (England) Z King	9	19
(Scotland) E O'Donnell (Scotland) C Torrance	21	21
(Czech Republic) A Bášová (Czech Republic) M Fuchsová	10	21
2	(Netherlands) S Piek (Netherlands) C Seinen	21	23

Second Round
Q3	(Scotland) L Middleton (Scotland) S Sidebottom	8	13
8	(Sweden) E Karlsson (Sweden) J Magnusson	21	21
(Scotland) E O'Donnell (Scotland) C Torrance	12	14
2	(Netherlands) S Piek (Netherlands) C Seinen	21	21

Quarter-finals
8	(Sweden) E Karlsson (Sweden) J Magnusson	21	18	15
2	(Netherlands) S Piek (Netherlands) C Seinen	14	21	21

== Mixed doubles ==
=== Seeds ===
1. (England) Marcus Ellis / Lauren Smith (champions)
2. (Germany) Mark Lamsfuß / Isabel Herttrich (semi-finals)
3. (Netherlands) Jacco Arends / Selena Piek (final)
4. (Germany) Marvin Emil Seidel / Linda Efler (second round)
5. (England) Ben Lane / Jessica Pugh (second round)
6. (France) Ronan Labar / Audrey Mittelheisser (quarter-finals)
7. (Netherlands) Robin Tabeling / Cheryl Seinen (quarter-finals)
8. (Denmark) Mikkel Mikkelsen / Mai Surrow (quarter-finals)

=== Finals ===
Semi-finals
1	(England) Marcus Ellis (England) Lauren Smith	21	21
Q3	(England) Tom Wolfenden (England) Jenny Moore	10	16
3	(Netherlands) Jacco Arends (Netherlands) Selena Piek	w	/	o
2	(Germany) Mark Lamsfuß (Germany) Isabel Herttrich

Final
1	(England) Marcus Ellis (England) Lauren Smith	13
3	(Netherlands) Jacco Arends (Netherlands) Selena Piek	6^{r}

=== Top half ===
==== Section 1 ====
First Round
1	(England) M Ellis (England) L Smith	21	21
(Denmark) M Bay-Smidt (Denmark) R Søby Hansen	18	17
(Switzerland) O Schaller (Switzerland) C Burkart	17	14
(Denmark) L Mølhede (Denmark) S Lundgaard	21	21
6	(France) R Labar (France) A Mittelheisser	21	21
(England) M Roe (England) J Hopton	15	13
(Germany) J Zurwonne (Germany) E Janssens	17	30	17
(China) Fan QY (China) Cao TW	21	29	21

Second Round
1	(England) M Ellis (England) L Smith	21	21
(Denmark) L Mølhede (Denmark) S Lundgaard	15	15
6	(France) R Labar (France) A Mittelheisser	21	21
(China) Fan QY (China) Cao TW	15	15

Quarter-finals
1	(England) M Ellis (England) L Smith	21	21
6	(France) R Labar (France) A Mittelheisser	15	16

==== Section 2 ====
First Round
4	(Germany) M E Seidel (Germany) L Efler	21	21
(Russia) A Zinchenko (Russia) O Morozova	12	14
Q2	(England) M Clare (England) V Williams	16	17
Q3	(England) T Wolfenden (England) J Moore	21	21
5	(England) B Lane (England) J Pugh	21	21
(Denmark) K Knudsen (Denmark) I Nielsen	12	12
(France) B Kersaudy (France) A Tran	23	22	16
(Republic of Ireland) S Magee (Republic of Ireland) C Magee	25	20	21

Second Round
4	(Germany) M E Seidel (Germany) L Efler	13	20
Q3	(England) T Wolfenden (England) J Moore	21	22
5	(England) B Lane (England) J Pugh	21	13	15
(Republic of Ireland) S Magee (Republic of Ireland) C Magee	16	21	21

Quarter-finals
Q3	(England) T Wolfenden (England) J Moore	21	21
(Republic of Ireland) S Magee (Republic of Ireland) C Magee	17	19

=== Bottom half ===
==== Section 3 ====
First Round
Q1	(Germany) P Käsbauer (Germany) J Goliszewski	20	21	21
PFQ	(Bulgaria) A Vlaar (Bulgaria) M Mitsova	22	17	19
(United States) E Kan (United States) B Chi	15	10
8	(Denmark) M Mikkelsen (Denmark) M Surrow	21	21
Q4	(Denmark) J Eipe (Denmark) M Poulsen	21	24
(Scotland) A Dunn (Scotland) E O'Donnell	17	22
(England) G Mairs (England) H Warner	12	11
3	(Netherlands) J Arends (Netherlands) S Piek	21	21

Second Round
Q1	(Germany) P Käsbauer (Germany) J Goliszewski	18	21	13
8	(Denmark) M Mikkelsen (Denmark) M Surrow	21	16	21
Q4	(Denmark) J Eipe (Denmark) M Poulsen	21	15	14
3	(Netherlands) J Arends (Netherlands) S Piek	15	21	21

Quarter-finals
8	(Denmark) M Mikkelsen (Denmark) M Surrow	21	14	21
3	(Netherlands) J Arends (Netherlands) S Piek	19	21	23

==== Section 4 ====
First Round
(France) T Gicquel (France) D Delrue	21	21
(Netherlands) R Jille (Netherlands) I van der Aar	16	15
(China) Chen SH (China) Yan CX	21	19
7	(Netherlands) R Tabeling (Netherlands) C Seinen	23	21
(Canada) N Yakura (Canada) K Tsai	21	16	16
(Scotland) A Hall (Scotland) J MacPherson	15	21	21
(Czech Republic) J Bitman (Czech Republic) A Bášová	8	17
2	(Germany) M Lamsfuß (Germany) I Herttrich	21	21

Second Round
(France) T Gicquel (France) D Delrue	15	11
7	(Netherlands) R Tabeling (Netherlands) C Seinen	21	21
(Scotland) A Hall (Scotland) J MacPherson	16	15
2	(Germany) M Lamsfuß (Germany) I Herttrich	21	21

Quarter-finals
7	(Netherlands) R Tabeling (Netherlands) C Seinen	18	17
2	(Germany) M Lamsfuß (Germany) I Herttrich	21	21

Preceded by 2017 Scottish Open Grand Prix	Scottish Open	Succeeded by 2019 Scottish Open
Preceded by 2018 Syed Modi International	BWF World Tour; 2018 BWF season	Succeeded by 2018 Korea Masters
