= Sun Feixiang =

Chinese badminton player (born 1998)

Sun Feixiang 孙飞翔
Personal information
- Born: 15 May 1998 (age 28) Yichang, Hubei, China
- Height: 1.76 m (5 ft 9 in)

Sport
- Country: China
- Sport: Badminton

Men's singles
- Highest ranking: 37 (5 November 2019)
- BWF profile
Medal record
Men's badminton
Representing China
World Junior Championships
Gold medal – first place	2015 Lima	Mixed team
Gold medal – first place	2016 Bilbao	Boys' singles
Gold medal – first place	2016 Bilbao	Mixed team
Bronze medal – third place	2013 Bangkok	Mixed team
Asian Junior Championships
Gold medal – first place	2015 Bangkok	Mixed team
Gold medal – first place	2016 Bangkok	Boys' singles
Gold medal – first place	2016 Bangkok	Mixed team

Sun Feixiang (Chinese: 孙飞翔; born 15 May 1998) is a Chinese badminton player. He was the gold medalist at the 2016 Asian and World Junior Championships in the boys' singles event. He won his first senior international title at the 2017 China International tournament in the men's singles event, and claimed his first BWF Tour title in the 2019 Indonesia Masters Super 100 tournament.

== Achievements ==
=== BWF World Junior Championships ===
Boys' singles
Year	Venue	Opponent	Score	Result
2016	Bilbao Arena; Bilbao, Spain	(Indonesia) Chico Aura Dwi Wardoyo	21–19, 21–12	Gold

=== Asian Junior Championships ===
Boys' singles
Year	Venue	Opponent	Score	Result
2016	CPB Badminton Training Center; Bangkok, Thailand	(Chinese Taipei) Lee Chia-hao	21–13, 21–15	Gold

=== BWF World Tour (2 titles, 3 runners-up) ===
The BWF World Tour, announced on 19 March 2017 and implemented in 2018, is a series of elite badminton tournaments, sanctioned by Badminton World Federation (BWF). The BWF World Tour is divided into six levels, namely World Tour Finals, Super 1000, Super 750, Super 500, Super 300, and the BWF Tour Super 100.

Men's singles
Year	Tournament	Level	Opponent	Score	Result
2018	Scottish Open	Super 100	(China) Liu Haichao	17–21, 20–22	(silver) Runner-up
2019	Indonesia Masters	Super 100	(Thailand) Tanongsak Saensomboonsuk	21–19, 21–14	(gold) Winner
2019	Vietnam Open	Super 100	(India) Sourabh Verma	12–21, 21–17, 14–21	(silver) Runner-up
2022	Vietnam Open	Super 100	(Japan) Kodai Naraoka	21–10, 14–21, 17–21	(silver) Runner-up
2023	Ruichang China Masters	Super 100	(China) Sun Chao	21–15, 21–14	(gold) Winner

=== BWF International Challenge/Series (1 title) ===
Men's singles
Year	Tournament	Opponent	Score	Result
2017	China International	(China) Zhao Junpeng	11–9, 11–7, 13–11	(gold) Winner

BWF International Challenge tournament
