= Liu Haichao =

Chinese badminton player

Liu Haichao 刘海超
Personal information
- Born: 22 March 1998 (age 28) Shanghai, China
- Height: 1.82 m (6 ft 0 in)

Sport
- Country: China
- Sport: Badminton

Men's singles
- Career record: 46 wins, 22 losses
- Highest ranking: 80 (12 November 2019)
- Current ranking: 390 (27 December 2022)
- BWF profile
Medal record
Men's badminton
Representing China
World Junior Championships
| Gold medal – first place | 2016 Bilbao | Mixed team |
Asian Junior Championships
| Gold medal – first place | 2016 Bangkok | Mixed team |
| Bronze medal – third place | 2016 Bangkok | Boys' singles |

Liu Haichao (Chinese: 刘海超; pinyin: Liú Hǎichāo; born 22 March 1998) is a Chinese badminton player from Shanghai. He was part of the national junior team that won the gold medal at the 2016 Asian and World Junior Championships, also won the bronze medal in the boys' singles at the Asian Junior Championships. He won his first senior international title at the 2018 Scottish Open.

== Achievements ==
=== Asian Junior Championships ===
Boys' singles
| Year | Venue | Opponent | Score | Result |
|---|---|---|---|---|
| 2016 | CPB Badminton Training Center; Bangkok, Thailand | (Chinese Taipei) Lee Chia-hao | 14–21, 21–16, 17–21 | Bronze |

=== BWF World Tour (1 title, 1 runner-up) ===
The BWF World Tour, which was announced on 19 March 2017 and implemented in 2018, is a series of elite badminton tournaments sanctioned by the Badminton World Federation (BWF). The BWF World Tour is divided into levels of World Tour Finals, Super 1000, Super 750, Super 500, Super 300 (part of the HSBC World Tour), and the BWF Tour Super 100.

Men's singles
| Year | Tournament | Level | Opponent | Score | Result |
|---|---|---|---|---|---|
| 2018 | Scottish Open | Super 100 | (China) Sun Feixiang | 21–17, 22–20 | (gold) Winner |
| 2019 | Lingshui China Masters | Super 100 | (China) Weng Hongyang | 7–21, 7–21 | (silver) Runner-up |

=== BWF International Challenge/Series (1 title, 1 runner-up) ===
Men's singles
| Year | Tournament | Opponent | Score | Result |
|---|---|---|---|---|
| 2022 | Croatian International | (Indonesia) Andi Fadel Muhammad | 19–21, 21–19, 21–18 | (gold) Winner |
| 2024 II | Vietnam International | (South Korea) Kim Byung-jae | 19–21, 20–22 | (silver) Runner-up |

BWF International Challenge tournament
BWF International Series tournament
BWF Future Series tournament
