= Lee Chia-hao =

Chinese Taipei badminton player (born 1999)

Lee Chia-hao 李佳豪
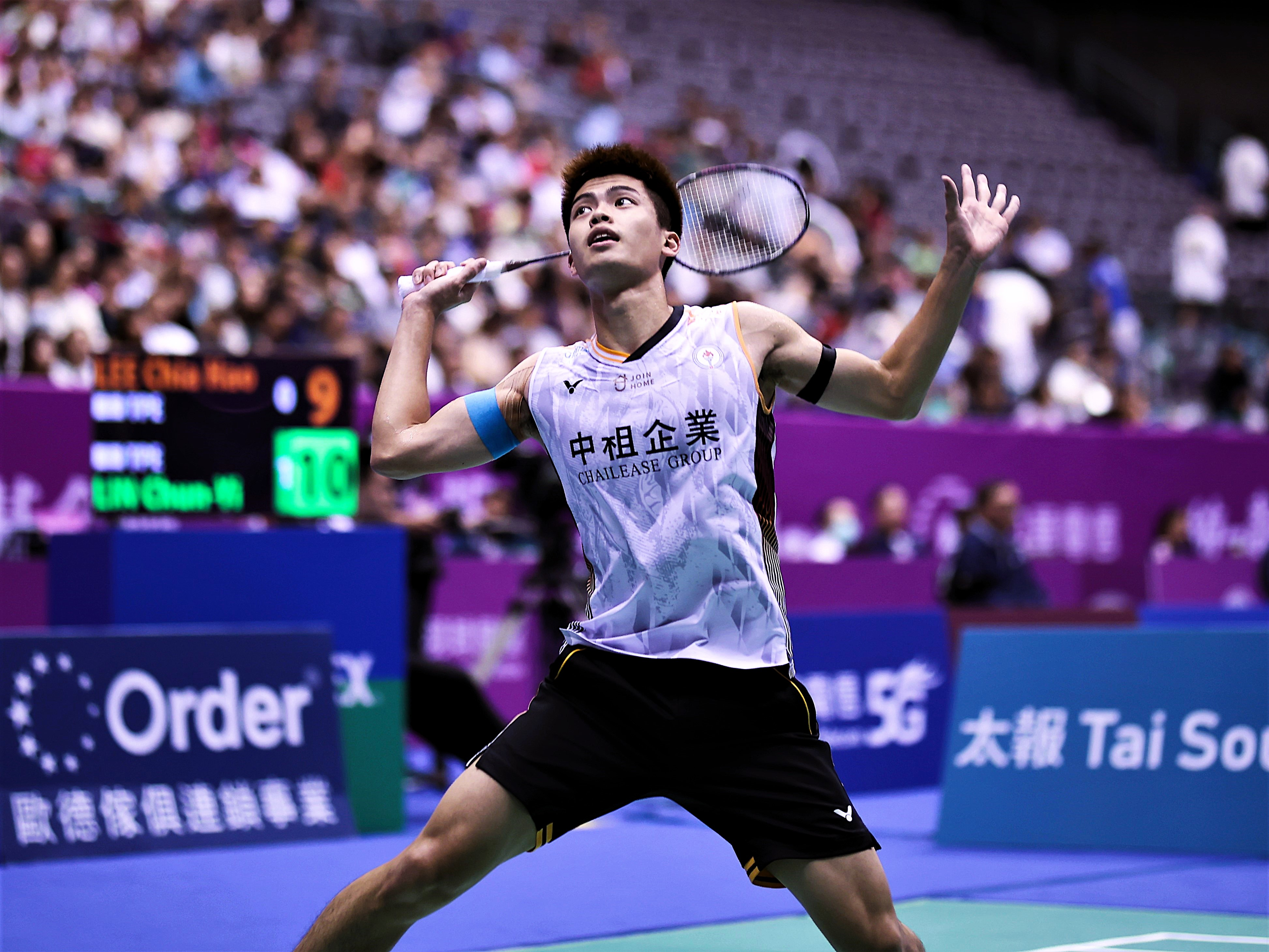
- Lee at the 2024 Taipei Open

Personal information
- Born: 4 June 1999 (age 27)
- Height: 1.77 m (5 ft 10 in)
- Weight: 68 kg (150 lb)

Sport
- Country: Chinese Taipei
- Sport: Badminton
- Handedness: Right

Men's singles
- Highest ranking: 13 (6 May 2025)
- Current ranking: 42 (10 November 2026)
- BWF profile
Medal record
Men's badminton
Representing Chinese Taipei
Thomas Cup
Bronze medal – third place	2024 Chengdu	Men's team
World University Games
Gold medal – first place	2021 Chengdu	Mixed team
World Junior Championships
Bronze medal – third place	2015 Lima	Mixed team
Asian Junior Championships
Silver medal – second place	2016 Bangkok	Boys' singles

Lee Chia-hao (Chinese: 李佳豪; pinyin: Lǐ Jiāháo; born 4 June 1999) is a Chinese Taipei badminton player affiliated with AP team.

== Career ==
Lee was born in a badminton family. His father Lee Mou-chou is a former national champion who now works as Land Bank team head coach, and his sister Lee Chia-hsin is a member of national team. He has won several junior titles in his career, namely 2016 Australian Junior International in both singles and doubles events, Singapore Youth International, 2017 German Junior Grand Prix, and defended his boys' singles Australian title. He also won the silver medal at the 2016 Asian Junior Championships. With his achievements, the 17-year-old, Lee became the first Taiwanese player to rank no. 1 in the world junior rankings in January 2017.

== Achievements ==
=== Asian Junior Championships ===
Boys' singles
Year	Venue	Opponent	Score	Result
2016	CPB Badminton Training Center; Bangkok, Thailand	(China) Sun Feixiang	13–21, 15–21	Silver

=== BWF World Tour (1 title, 3 runners-up) ===
The BWF World Tour, which was announced on 19 March 2017 and implemented in 2018, is a series of elite badminton tournaments sanctioned by the Badminton World Federation (BWF). The BWF World Tours are divided into levels of World Tour Finals, Super 1000, Super 750, Super 500, Super 300, and the BWF Tour Super 100.

Men's singles
Year	Tournament	Level	Opponent	Score	Result
2023	Malaysia Super 100	Super 100	(Malaysia) Leong Jun Hao	20–22, 13–21	(silver) Runner-up
2024	Kaohsiung Masters	Super 100	(Malaysia) Cheam June Wei	21–15, 21–12	(gold) Winner
2024	Korea Open	Super 500	(China) Lu Guangzu	16–21, 22–20, 18–21	(silver) Runner-up
2025	All England Open	Super 1000	(China) Shi Yuqi	17–21, 19–21	(silver) Runner-up

=== BWF International Challenge/Series (1 title, 3 runners-up) ===
Men's singles
Year	Tournament	Opponent	Score	Result
2022	Polish Open	(India) Kiran George	15–21, 14–21	(silver) Runner-up
2022	Hungarian International	(Chinese Taipei) Lin Chun-yi	21–9, 21–14	(gold) Winner
2022	Norwegian International	(Chinese Taipei) Lin Chun-yi	12–21, 11–21	(silver) Runner-up

Men's doubles
Year	Tournament	Partner	Opponent	Score	Result
2019	Perth International	(Chinese Taipei) Liu Wei-chi	(Malaysia) Tan Boon Heong (Malaysia) Shia Chun Kang	17–21, 16–21	(silver) Runner-up

BWF International Challenge tournament
BWF International Series tournament
BWF Future Series tournament

=== BWF Junior International (5 titles) ===
Boys' singles
Year	Tournament	Opponent	Score	Result
2016	Australian Junior International	(Chinese Taipei) Hu Chuan-en	21–16, 21–11	(gold) Winner
2016	Singapore Youth International	(Indonesia) Mukhammad Rizqy Ramadhani	21–10, 21–12	(gold) Winner
2017	German Junior International	(India) Lakshya Sen	19–21, 21–11, 21–18	(gold) Winner
2017	Australian Junior International	(Chinese Taipei) Su Li-yang	21–16, 21–13	(gold) Winner

Boys' doubles
Year	Tournament	Partner	Opponent	Score	Result
2016	Australian Junior International	(Chinese Taipei) Hu Chuan-en	(Australia) Keith Mark Edison (Australia) Tristan Michael Edison	21–13, 21–9	(gold) Winner

BWF Junior International Grand Prix tournament
BWF Junior International Challenge tournament
BWF Junior International Series tournament
BWF Junior Future Series tournament
