= Weng Hongyang =

Chinese badminton player (born 1999)

Weng Hongyang 翁泓阳
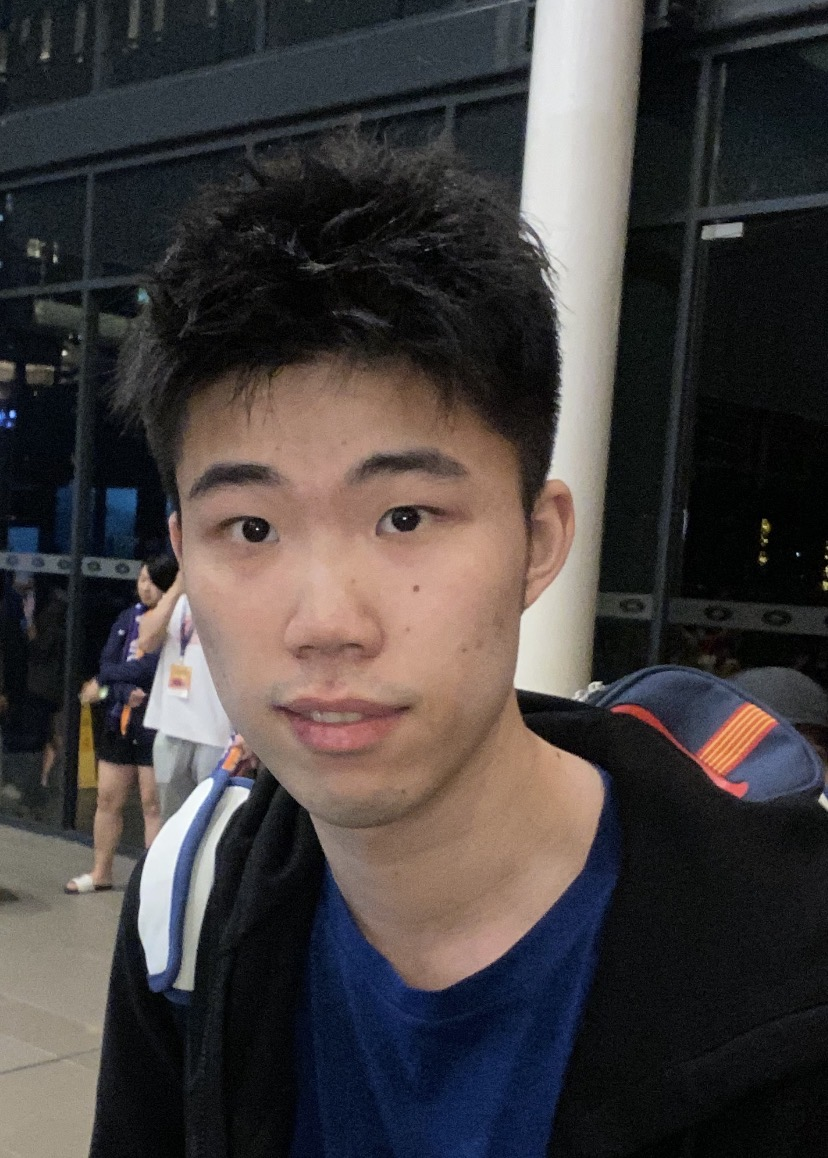

Personal information
- Born: 18 June 1999 (age 27) Fuzhou, Fujian, China
- Height: 1.82 m (6 ft 0 in)

Sport
- Country: China
- Sport: Badminton
- Handedness: Left

Men's singles
- Career record: 121 wins, 69 losses
- Highest ranking: 10 (30 September 2025)
- Current ranking: 29 (27 October 2026)
- BWF profile
Medal record
Men's badminton
Representing China
Thomas Cup
Gold medal – first place	2024 Chengdu	Men's team
Gold medal – first place	2026 Horsens	Men's team
Silver medal – second place	2020 Aarhus	Men's team
Asian Games
Gold medal – first place	2022 Hangzhou	Men's team
Silver medal – second place	2026 Aichi–Nagoya	Men's team
Asian Championships
Bronze medal – third place	2022 Manila	Men's singles
Asia Team Championships
Gold medal – first place	2024 Selangor	Men's team
Sudirman Cup
Gold medal – first place	2025 Xiamen	Mixed team

Weng Hongyang
- Traditional Chinese: 翁泓陽
- Simplified Chinese: 翁泓阳
Transcriptions
Standard Mandarin
- Hanyu Pinyin: Wēng Hóngyáng
- IPA: [wə́ŋ xʊ̌ŋ.jǎŋ]

Weng Hongyang (Chinese: 翁泓阳; pinyin: Wēng Hóngyáng; born 18 June 1999) is a Chinese badminton player. He won his first BWF World Tour title at the 2019 Lingshui China Masters. He was part of China winning team in the 2024 Thomas Cup.

== Career ==
=== Early career ===
Weng entered the Fuzhou Sports School in 2006, and later the Fujian Sports School in 2009. He joined the provincial sports team in March 2011, and entered the national team in March 2018. In 2019, he won the Lingshui China Masters, defeating Liu Haichao in straight games in the final.

=== 2020–2021 ===
In November 2020, he won the men's singles title of the China National Championships. Weng was part of the Fujian winning team at the 2021 National Games of China.

=== 2022 ===
In the Korea Open, Weng was promoted from the reserves list to enter the main draw. He defeated home favorite Heo Kwang-hee in the first round, and defeated Malaysians Cheam June Wei and Ng Tze Yong to reach the semi-finals. There, he defeated Denmark's Victor Svendsen to reach his career's maiden World Tour Super 500 final. In the final, he defeated Indonesia's Jonatan Christie to win his career's biggest title, despite being one game down and trailing 16–19 in the second. It was his career's biggest win.

In the Asian Championships, Weng qualified for the main draw. He defeated former World No.1 Srikanth Kidambi and Olympic bronze medalist Anthony Sinisuka Ginting to enter the semi-finals. However, he was defeated by eventual champion Lee Zii Jia in straight games. Despite this, he still won a bronze medal, which was his first medal from a major tournament.

=== 2023 ===
Weng won his second BWF World Tour Super 500 title at the Australian Open, with victories against Kodai Naraoka, Chou Tien-chen and Lee Zii Jia. In the final, Weng came from 14–19 down and saved a match point in the deciding game to defeat Prannoy H. S. He then won the Denmark Open defetating Lee Zii Jia in the final.

=== 2024 ===
Weng reached his first ever BWF World Tour Super 1000 tournament in the China Open. He won the title after beating Kodai Naraoka in the final.

=== 2025 ===
Weng did not start well in this year, losing in the first round in Malaysia Open but he certainly did better in India Open, reaching semi-finals. In March, Weng won his first Super 300 in Swiss Open against Christo Popov in straight sets. Weng won his second title on the year in his home at China Masters, beating Lin Chun-yi in the process.

== Achievements ==
=== Asian Championships ===
Men's singles
Year	Venue	Opponent	Score	Result	Ref.
2022	Muntinlupa Sports Complex, Metro Manila, Philippines	(Malaysia) Lee Zii Jia	11–21, 19–21	Bronze	

=== BWF World Tour (7 titles, 2 runners-up) ===
The BWF World Tour, which was announced on 19 March 2017 and implemented in 2018, is a series of elite badminton tournaments sanctioned by the Badminton World Federation (BWF). The BWF World Tour is divided into levels of World Tour Finals, Super 1000, Super 750, Super 500, Super 300, and the BWF Tour Super 100.

Men's singles
Year	Tournament	Level	Opponent	Score	Result	Ref.
2019	Lingshui China Masters	Super 100	(China) Liu Haichao	21–7, 21–7	(gold) Winner	
2019	SaarLorLux Open	Super 100	(India) Lakshya Sen	21–17, 18–21, 16–21	(silver) Runner-up	
2022	Korea Open	Super 500	(Indonesia) Jonatan Christie	12–21, 21–19, 21–15	(gold) Winner	
2023	Malaysia Masters	Super 500	(India) Prannoy H. S.	19–21, 21–13, 18–21	(silver) Runner-up	
2023	Australian Open	Super 500	(India) Prannoy H. S.	21–9, 21–23, 22–20	(gold) Winner	
2023	Denmark Open	Super 750	(Malaysia) Lee Zii Jia	21–12, 21–6	(gold) Winner	
2024	China Open	Super 1000	(Japan) Kodai Naraoka	21–17, 21–12	(gold) Winner	
2025	Swiss Open	Super 300	(France) Christo Popov	21–18, 21–3	(gold) Winner	
2025	China Masters	Super 750	(Chinese Taipei) Lin Chun-yi	21–11, 21–15	(gold) Winner	

=== BWF International Challenge/Series (1 title) ===
Men's singles
Year	Tournament	Opponent	Score	Result	Ref.
2022 (II)	Indonesia International	(China) Lei Lanxi	21–10, 21–10	(gold) Winner	

BWF International Challenge tournament
BWF International Series tournament
BWF Future Series tournament
