= 2019 Lingshui China Masters =

Badminton tournament in Hainan

Tournament details
- Dates: 12–17 March
- Edition: 2nd
- Level: Super 100
- Total prize money: US$75,000
- Venue: Agile Stadium
- Location: Lingshui, Hainan, China

Champions
- Men's singles: (China) Weng Hongyang
- Women's singles: (South Korea) Kim Ga-eun
- Men's doubles: (Chinese Taipei) Lee Jhe-huei (Chinese Taipei) Yang Po-hsuan
- Women's doubles: (South Korea) Baek Ha-na (South Korea) Kim Hye-rin
- Mixed doubles: (Hong Kong) Tang Chun Man (Hong Kong) Ng Tsz Yau

The 2019 Lingshui China Masters was a badminton tournament which took place at Agile Stadium in China from 12 to 17 March 2019 and had a total purse of $75,000.

== Tournament ==
The 2019 Lingshui China Masters was the first Super 100 tournament of the 2019 BWF World Tour and also part of the Lingshui China Masters championships. This tournament was organized by the Chinese Badminton Association and sanctioned by the BWF.

=== Venue ===
This international tournament was held at Agile Stadium which located inside the Lingshui Culture and Sports Square in Lingshui, Hainan, China.

=== Point distribution ===
Below is the point distribution for each phase of the tournament based on the BWF points system for the BWF Tour Super 100 event.

Winner	Runner-up	3/4	5/8	9/16	17/32	33/64	65/128	129/256
5,500	4,680	3,850	3,030	2,110	1,290	510	240	100

=== Prize money ===
The total prize money for this tournament was US$75,000. Distribution of prize money was in accordance with BWF regulations.

Event	Winner	Finals	Semi-finals	Quarter-finals	Last 16
Singles	$5,625	$2,850	$1,087.50	$450	$262.50
Doubles	$5,925	$2,850	$1,050	$543.75	$281.25

== Men's singles ==
=== Seeds ===
1. (Indonesia) Ihsan Maulana Mustofa (third round)
2. (China) Zhao Junpeng (second round)
3. (Malaysia) Chong Wei Feng (second round)
4. (China) Zhou Zeqi (quarter-finals)
5. (Indonesia) Shesar Hiren Rhustavito (second round)
6. (Indonesia) Firman Abdul Kholik (second round)
7. (Indonesia) Chico Aura Dwi Wardoyo (second round)
8. (Indonesia) Sony Dwi Kuncoro (withdrew)

=== Finals ===
Semi-finals
(Malaysia) Iskandar Zulkarnain	9	22	16
(China) Liu Haichao	21	20	21
(India) Lakshya Sen	9	21	17
(China) Weng Hongyang	21	12	21

Final
(China) Liu Haichao	7	7
(China) Weng Hongyang	21	21

=== Top half ===
==== Section 1 ====
First Round
(Laos) N Luangamath	7	9
(Canada) XD Sheng	21	21
(Malaysia) I Zulkarnain	21	21
Q1	(China) Liu L	15	10
(Chinese Taipei) Chen S-c	21	21
Q8	(China) Chen XJ	13	11
Q7	(Chinese Taipei) Yu S-p	9	21	14
(Chinese Taipei) Yang C-c	21	15	21

Second Round
1	(Indonesia) I M Mustofa	21	21
(Canada) XD Sheng	15	16
(Chinese Taipei) Hsueh H-y	18	21	7
(Malaysia) I Zulkarnain	21	18	21
PFQ	(China) Yu JH	20	21	21
(Chinese Taipei) Chen S-c	22	15	6
(China) Liu SM	21	13	14
(Chinese Taipei) Yang C-c	17	21	21

Third Round
1	(Indonesia) I M Mustofa	21	13	9
(Malaysia) I Zulkarnain	14	21	21
PFQ	(China) Yu JH	18	21	16
(Chinese Taipei) Yang C-c	21	14	21

Quarter-finals
(Malaysia) I Zulkarnain	13	21	21
(Chinese Taipei) Yang C-c	21	9	12

==== Section 2 ====
First Round
(China) Liu HC	21	5	21
(Chinese Taipei) Lu C-h	13	21	15
(Malaysia) Soong J V	21	19	19
(Malaysia) Lim C W	12	21	21
(Chinese Taipei) Lin C-y	17	21	21
(Chinese Taipei) Liu W-c	21	16	16
(Chinese Taipei) Chi Y-j	21	13	21
Q6	(China) Wu KA	10	21	12

Second Round
3	(Malaysia) Chong W F	17	16
(China) Liu HC	21	21
Q2	(Chinese Taipei) Huang P-h	22	22
(Malaysia) Lim C W	20	20
7	(Indonesia) C A Dwi Wardoyo	15	14
(Chinese Taipei) Lin C-y	21	21
Q4	(China) Gao ZZ	21	21
(Chinese Taipei) Chi Y-j	16	18

Third Round
(China) Liu HC	21	19	24
Q2	(Chinese Taipei) Huang P-h	13	21	22
(Chinese Taipei) Lin C-y	17	15
Q4	(China) Gao ZZ	21	21

Quarter-finals
(China) Liu HC	21	21
Q4	(China) Gao ZZ	13	10

=== Bottom half ===
==== Section 3 ====
First Round
(Singapore) Loh K Y	21	24	21
(Chinese Taipei) Chen Y-c	11	26	12
(England) K L Chun	5	4
(South Korea) Ha Y-w	21	21
Q3	(China) Zhang WY	21	21
(Mongolia) B Munkhbat	5	8
(China) Ren CM	18	14
(Chinese Taipei) Yang Y	21	21

Second Round
(Singapore) Loh K Y	12	13
(India) L Sen	21	21
(South Korea) Ha Y-w	21	12	24
5	(Indonesia) S H Rhustavito	19	21	22
Q3	(China) Zhang WY	21	21
(England) F M Hassan	4	4
(Chinese Taipei) Yang Y	14	17
4	(China) Zhou ZQ	21	21

Third Round
(India) L Sen	21	21
(South Korea) Ha Y-w	14	15
Q3	(China) Zhang WY	12	13
4	(China) Zhou ZQ	21	21

Quarter-finals
(India) L Sen	16	21	21
4	(China) Zhou ZQ	21	15	19

==== Section 4 ====
First Round
(South Korea) Kim D-h	23	22
(Indonesia) I Rumbay	21	20
(China) Cao YF	15	12
Q5	(China) Lei LX	21	21
(Malaysia) Cheam J W	21	21
(Australia) D Fan	13	14
(Chinese Taipei) Lee C-h	18	21	21
(Chinese Taipei) Chang E-c	21	13	11

Second Round
(South Korea) Kim D-h	14	21	21
(Chinese Taipei) Su L-y	21	15	9
Q5	(China) Lei LX	26	21
6	(Indonesia) F A Kholik	24	8
(Malaysia) Cheam J W	19	21	17
(China) Weng HY	21	18	21
(Chinese Taipei) Lee C-h	20	21	21
2	(China) Zhao JP	22	16	19

Third Round
(South Korea) Kim D-h	21	21
Q5	(China) Lei LX	19	17
(China) Weng HY	21	21
(Chinese Taipei) Lee C-h	9	16

Quarter-finals
(South Korea) Kim D-h	21	14	13
(China) Weng HY	18	21	21

== Women's singles ==
=== Seeds ===
1. (China) Zhang Yiman (final)
2. (South Korea) Kim Ga-eun (champion)
3. (Chinese Taipei) Chiang Ying-li (first round)
4. (South Korea) Kim Hyo-min (semi-finals)
5. (Thailand) Chananchida Jucharoen (first round)
6. (South Korea) Jeon Joo-i (quarter-finals)
7. (Chinese Taipei) Chen Su-yu (first round)
8. (Chinese Taipei) Lin Ying-chun (first round)

=== Finals ===
Semi-finals
1	(China) Zhang Yiman	21	21
(South Korea) Sim Yu-jin	19	15
4	(South Korea) Kim Hyo-min	13	14
2	(South Korea) Kim Ga-eun	21	21

Final
1	(China) Zhang Yiman	20	21	17
2	(South Korea) Kim Ga-eun	22	14	21

=== Top half ===
==== Section 1 ====
First round
1	(China) Zhang YM	21	21
PFQ	(Chinese Taipei) Yu C	15	15
(China) Wei YX	20	14
Q1	(South Korea) Kim N-y	22	21
5	(Thailand) C Jucharoen	21	10	13
(Chinese Taipei) Lin H-t	13	21	21
(Australia) Chen H-y	9	10
(China) Ji ST	21	21

Second round
1	(China) Zhang YM	21	19	21
Q1	(South Korea) Kim N-y	19	21	16
(Chinese Taipei) Lin H-t	21	16	15
(China) Ji ST	11	21	21

Quarter-finals
1	(China) Zhang YM	21	21
(China) Ji ST	9	13

==== Section 2 ====
First round
3	(Chinese Taipei) Chiang Y-l	21	10	17
(South Korea) Sim Y-j	10	21	21
Q2	(China) Wang SQ	17	22	21
(India) S U R Chukka	21	20	7
8	(Chinese Taipei) Lin Y-c	23	18	12
(China) Li Y	21	21	21
Q3	(China) Zheng SY	21	25
(Thailand) N Aimsaard	6	23

Second round
(South Korea) Sim Y-j	21	21
Q2	(China) Wang SQ	19	9
(China) Li Y	16	21	21
Q3	(China) Zheng SY	21	9	9

Quarter-finals
(South Korea) Sim Y-j	21	21
(China) Li Y	15	14

=== Bottom half ===
==== Section 3 ====
First round
(Chinese Taipei) Chien H-y	21	13	10
(Singapore) G Chua	9	21	21
(Chinese Taipei) Hsieh Y-y	13	18
6	(South Korea) Jeon J-i	21	21
Q4	(China) Zhou M	14	21	8
(South Korea) An S-y	21	19	7^{r}
(United States) C Pan	12	4
4	(South Korea) Kim H-m	21	21

Second round
(Singapore) G Chua	8	17
6	(South Korea) Jeon J-i	21	21
Q4	(China) Zhou M	19	16
4	(South Korea) Kim H-m	21	21

Quarter-finals
6	(South Korea) Jeon J-i	19	20
4	(South Korea) Kim H-m	21	22

==== Section 4 ====
First round
(Japan) N Shimoda	21	21
(South Korea) Lee S-y	10	18
(Thailand) P Chaiwan	21	21
7	(Chinese Taipei) Chen S-y	13	13
(Chinese Taipei) Liang T-y	21	21
(United States) I Rusli	9	6
(China) Wang ZY	15	16
2	(South Korea) Kim G-e	21	21

Second round
(Japan) N Shimoda	21	8	16
(Thailand) P Chaiwan	13	21	21
(Chinese Taipei) Liang T-y	18	11
2	(South Korea) Kim G-e	21	21

Quarter-finals
(Thailand) P Chaiwan	16	17
2	(South Korea) Kim G-e	21	21

== Men's doubles ==
=== Seeds ===
1. (China) Ou Xuanyi / Ren Xiangyu (final)
2. (Indonesia) Akbar Bintang Cahyono / Muhammad Reza Pahlevi Isfahani (withdrew)
3. (Indonesia) Frengky Wijaya Putra / Sabar Karyaman Gutama (quarter-finals)
4. (Malaysia) Chooi Kah Ming / Low Juan Shen (quarter-finals)
5. (China) Di Zijian / Wang Chang (semi-finals)
6. (China) Huang Kaixiang / Wang Zekang (semi-finals)
7. (Chinese Taipei) Lin Shang-kai / Tseng Min-hao (second round)
8. (South Korea) Choi Hyuk-gyun / Kim Jae-hwan (first round)

=== Finals ===
Semi-finals
1	(China) Ou Xuanyi (China) Ren Xiangyu	16	21	21
6	(China) Huang Kaixiang (China) Wang Zekang	21	14	17
5	(China) Di Zijian (China) Wang Chang	21	17	16
(Chinese Taipei) Lee Jhe-huei (Chinese Taipei) Yang Po-hsuan	18	21	21

Final
1	(China) Ou Xuanyi (China) Ren Xiangyu	17	16
(Chinese Taipei) Lee Jhe-huei (Chinese Taipei) Yang Po-hsuan	21	21

=== Top half ===
==== Section 1 ====
First round
1	(China) Ou XY (China) Ren XY	21	21
(China) Guan ZC (China) Jiang ZB	14	15
(Hong Kong) Chang T C (Hong Kong) Yeung M N	21	22
(Chinese Taipei) Lin Y-c (Chinese Taipei) Wu Y-c	14	20
8	(South Korea) Choi H-g (South Korea) Kim J-h	21	14	10
(China) Dong WJ (China) Guo XW	16	21	21
(China) Guo RH (China) Huang JW	16	19
Q4	(South Korea) Na S-s (South Korea) Wang C	21	21

Second round
1	(China) Ou XY (China) Ren XY	21	21
(Hong Kong) Chang T C (Hong Kong) Yeung M N	18	16
(China) Dong WJ (China) Guo XW	16	21	20
Q4	(South Korea) Na S-s (South Korea) Wang C	21	19	22

Quarter-finals
1	(China) Ou XY (China) Ren XY	21	21
Q4	(South Korea) Na S-s (South Korea) Wang C	14	19

==== Section 2 ====
First round
3	(Indonesia) S K Gutama (Indonesia) F W Putra	24	21
(Chinese Taipei) Lin S-c (Chinese Taipei) Yang C-h	22	16
(Chinese Taipei) Chang E-c (Chinese Taipei) Chen X-y	21	21
(Malaysia) M Amar M Sani (Malaysia) M Amir M Sani	11	19
6	(China) Huang KX (China) Wang ZK	21	21
Q1	(China) Li JY (China) Liu SW	7	14
Q3	(Hong Kong) Y Chung (Hong Kong) Or C C	18	24	21
(Malaysia) Low H Y (Malaysia) Ng E C	21	22	17

Second round
3	(Indonesia) S K Gutama (Indonesia) F W Putra	21	21
(Chinese Taipei) Chang E-c (Chinese Taipei) Chen X-y	6	16
6	(China) Huang KX (China) Wang ZK	21	21
Q3	(Hong Kong) Y Chung (Hong Kong) Or C C	12	15

Quarter-finals
3	(Indonesia) S K Gutama (Indonesia) F W Putra	15	12
6	(China) Huang KX (China) Wang ZK	21	21

=== Bottom half ===
==== Section 3 ====
First round
(China) Liang WK (China) Shang YC	19	21	19
(Malaysia) Choong H J (Malaysia) Man W C	21	16	21
(China) Xuheng ZY (China) Zhang BR	17	19
5	(China) Di ZJ (China) Wang C	21	21
(China) Dai ZY (China) Zheng K	13	14
(Chinese Taipei) Lin C-y (Chinese Taipei) Yang M-t	21	21
(China) Huang D (China) Liang YW	8	21	9
4	(Malaysia) Chooi K M (Malaysia) Low J S	21	19	21

Second round
(Malaysia) Choong H J (Malaysia) Man W C	14	17
5	(China) Di ZJ (China) Wang C	21	21
(Chinese Taipei) Lin C-y (Chinese Taipei) Yang M-t	14	17
4	(Malaysia) Chooi K M (Malaysia) Low J S	21	21

Quarter-finals
5	(China) Di ZJ (China) Wang C	21	21
4	(Malaysia) Chooi K M (Malaysia) Low J S	14	16

==== Section 4 ====
First round
(Chinese Taipei) Lee J-h (Chinese Taipei) Yang P-h	21	18	23
(Chinese Taipei) Su L-w (Chinese Taipei) Tang K-w	14	21	21
(Chinese Taipei) Lee S-m (Chinese Taipei) Lin Y-s	21	18	17
7	(Chinese Taipei) Lin S-k (Chinese Taipei) Tseng M-h	16	21	21
Q2	(Chinese Taipei) Lin C-y (Chinese Taipei) Yu S-p	16	16
(South Korea) Kim S-r (Malaysia) Tan B H	21	21
(Chinese Taipei) Liu W-c (Chinese Taipei) Lu C	21	21
PFQ	(Chinese Taipei) Lin K-t (Chinese Taipei) Su L-y	14	13

Second round
(Chinese Taipei) Lee J-h (Chinese Taipei) Yang P-h	21	21
7	(Chinese Taipei) Lin S-k (Chinese Taipei) Tseng M-h	11	17
(South Korea) Kim S-r (Malaysia) Tan B H	21	21
(Chinese Taipei) Liu W-c (Chinese Taipei) Lu C	19	19

Quarter-finals
(Chinese Taipei) Lee J-h (Chinese Taipei) Yang P-h	21	16	21
(South Korea) Kim S-r (Malaysia) Tan B H	17	21	16

== Women's doubles ==
=== Seeds ===
1. (China) Dong Wenjing / Feng Xueying (second round)
2. (Singapore) Citra Putri Sari Dewi / Jin Yujia (first round)
3. (Indonesia) Febriana Dwipuji Kusuma / Ribka Sugiarto (second round)
4. (South Korea) Baek Ha-na / Kim Hye-rin (champions)
5. (China) Cao Tongwei / Yu Xiaohan (quarter-finals)
6. (Chinese Taipei) Chung Kan-yu / Lin Xiao-min (first round)
7. (China) Liu Xuanxuan / Xia Yuting (final)
8. (Indonesia) Virni Putri / Vania Arianti Sukoco (second round)

=== Finals ===
Semi-finals
7	(China) Liu Xuanxuan (China) Xia Yuting	21	21
(China) Chen Xiaofei (China) Zhou Chaomin	17	18
4	(South Korea) Baek Ha-na (South Korea) Kim Hye-rin	21	21
(China) Chen Yingying (China) Zhang Shuxian	14	16

Final
7	(China) Liu Xuanxuan (China) Xia Yuting	14	21	15
4	(South Korea) Baek Ha-na (South Korea) Kim Hye-rin	21	14	21

=== Top half ===
==== Section 1 ====
First round
(China) Chen FH (China) Hua XB	21	21
(China) Luo XM (China) Zhou XR	16	15
7	(China) Liu XX (China) Xia YT	21	21
(Chinese Taipei) Pai Y-p (Chinese Taipei) Wu T-j	7	17
(Chinese Taipei) Tai W-l (Chinese Taipei) Wu F-c	12	16
(China) Yan CX (China) Zhou SQ	21	21

Second round
1	(China) Dong WJ (China) Feng XY	15	23
(China) Chen FH (China) Hua XB	21	25
7	(China) Liu XX (China) Xia YT	21	21
(China) Yan CX (China) Zhou SQ	15	12

Quarter-finals
(China) Chen FH (China) Hua XB	10	19
7	(China) Liu XX (China) Xia YT	21	21

==== Section 2 ====
First round
3	(Indonesia) F D Kusuma (Indonesia) R Sugiarto	21	21
(China) Chen YX (China) Lin FL	14	15
(Chinese Taipei) Kuo Y-w (Chinese Taipei) Lin W-c	21	21
(Chinese Taipei) Hung S-h (Chinese Taipei) Yu C-h	18	19
6	(Chinese Taipei) Chung K-y (Chinese Taipei) Lin X-m	7	11
(China) Chen XF (China) Zhou CM	21	21
(China) Chen QY (China) Feng ZX	21	13	20
(Chinese Taipei) Cheng Y-c (Chinese Taipei) Hsieh P-s	14	21	22

Second round
3	(Indonesia) F D Kusuma (Indonesia) R Sugiarto	9	16
(Chinese Taipei) Kuo Y-w (Chinese Taipei) Lin W-c	21	21
(China) Chen XF (China) Zhou CM	21	21
(Chinese Taipei) Cheng Y-c (Chinese Taipei) Hsieh P-s	14	17

Quarter-finals
(Chinese Taipei) Kuo Y-w (Chinese Taipei) Lin W-c	17	16
(China) Chen XF (China) Zhou CM	21	21

=== Bottom half ===
==== Section 3 ====
First round
(Chinese Taipei) Li Z-q (Chinese Taipei) Teng C-h	21	21
(China) Keng SL (China) Qian GH	12	17
(China) Hou FF (China) Li JJ	19	15
5	(China) Cao TW (China) Yu XH	21	21
(Japan) M Kayama (Japan) R Ozeki	22	19	22
(Thailand) P Chaiwan (Thailand) C Jucharoen	20	21	24
(China) Yang XY (China) Zhang JE	10	6
4	(South Korea) Baek H-n (South Korea) Kim H-r	21	21

Second round
(Chinese Taipei) Li Z-q (Chinese Taipei) Teng C-h	16	21	15
5	(China) Cao TW (China) Yu XH	21	14	21
(Thailand) P Chaiwan (Thailand) C Jucharoen	9	12
4	(South Korea) Baek H-n (South Korea) Kim H-r	21	21

Quarter-finals
5	(China) Cao TW (China) Yu XH	21	19	19
4	(South Korea) Baek H-n (South Korea) Kim H-r	15	21	21

==== Section 4 ====
First round
(China) Chen YY (China) Zhang SX	21	21
(Japan) Y Oishi (Japan) T Sagawa	10	15
(China) Guo LZ (China) Li YJ	13	21	16
8	(Indonesia) V Putri (Indonesia) V A Sukoco	21	12	21
(Chinese Taipei) Liang T-y (Chinese Taipei) Lin J-y	17	15
(South Korea) Jeong N-e (South Korea) Kim M-j	21	21
(Chinese Taipei) Liu C-y (Chinese Taipei) Wang Y-q	21	16	21
2	(Singapore) C P Sari Dewi (Singapore) Jin YJ	16	21	14

Second round
(China) Chen YY (China) Zhang SX	22	21
8	(Indonesia) V Putri (Indonesia) V A Sukoco	20	13
(South Korea) Jeong N-e (South Korea) Kim M-j	21	21
(Chinese Taipei) Liu C-y (Chinese Taipei) Wang Y-q	18	13

Quarter-finals
(China) Chen YY (China) Zhang SX	21	15	21
(South Korea) Jeong N-e (South Korea) Kim M-j	13	21	17

== Mixed doubles ==
=== Seeds ===
1. (Malaysia) Hoo Pang Ron / Cheah Yee See (second round)
2. (China) Ou Xuanyi / Feng Xueying (quarter-finals)
3. (China) Ren Xiangyu / Zhou Chaomin (quarter-finals)
4. (Indonesia) Zachariah Josiahno Sumanti / Angelica Wiratama (first round)
5. (South Korea) Choi Hyuk-gyun / Baek Ha-na (first round)
6. (Singapore) Danny Bawa Chrisnanta / Tan Wei Han (semi-finals)
7. (China) Chen Sihang / Zhou Shunqi (first round)
8. (China) Guo Xinwa / Liu Xuanxuan (final)

=== Finals ===
Semi-finals
(China) Dong Weijie (China) Chen Xiaofei	21	16	19
8	(China) Guo Xinwa (China) Liu Xuanxuan	19	21	21
6	(Singapore) Danny Bawa Chrisnanta (Singapore) Tan Wei Han	14	19
(Hong Kong) Tang Chun Man (Hong Kong) Ng Tsz Yau	21	21

Final
8	(China) Guo Xinwa (China) Liu Xuanxuan	21	14	13
(Hong Kong) Tang Chun Man (Hong Kong) Ng Tsz Yau	16	21	21

=== Top half ===
==== Section 1 ====
First round
1	(Malaysia) Hoo P R (Malaysia) Cheah Y S	21	21
Q2	(China) Ye YP (China) Zhang JE	11	15
(China) Dong WJ (China) Chen XF	21	21
(Chinese Taipei) Tang K-w (Chinese Taipei) Lin H-t	13	9
5	(South Korea) Choi H-g (South Korea) Baek H-n	16	16
(Chinese Taipei) Yang M-t (Chinese Taipei) Wu T-j	21	21
(Indonesia) A Maulana (Indonesia) M C Bandaso	21	21
(China) Dai EY (China) Keng SL	17	7

Second round
1	(Malaysia) Hoo P R (Malaysia) Cheah Y S	12	16
(China) Dong WJ (China) Chen XF	21	21
(Chinese Taipei) Yang M-t (Chinese Taipei) Wu T-j	13	22	21
(Indonesia) A Maulana (Indonesia) M C Bandaso	21	20	15

Quarter-finals
(China) Dong WJ (China) Chen XF	15	21	21
(Chinese Taipei) Yang M-t (Chinese Taipei) Wu T-j	21	18	19

==== Section 2 ====
First round
3	(China) Ren XY (China) Zhou CM	12	24	23
(South Korea) Kim J-h (South Korea) Kim H-r	21	22	21
(Chinese Taipei) Chen X-y (Chinese Taipei) Yu C-h	21	21
(Chinese Taipei) Lin S-k (Chinese Taipei) Cheng Y-c	15	16
8	(China) Guo XW (China) Liu XX	21	21
(China) Zeng WH (China) Zhou XR	6	12
(China) Huang JW (China) Chen FH	18	14
(Chinese Taipei) Lin Y-s (Chinese Taipei) Lin W-c	21	21

Second round
3	(China) Ren XY (China) Zhou CM	21	20	21
(Chinese Taipei) Chen X-y (Chinese Taipei) Yu C-h	12	22	14
8	(China) Guo XW (China) Liu XX	21	21
(Chinese Taipei) Lin Y-s (Chinese Taipei) Lin W-c	12	16

Quarter-finals
3	(China) Ren XY (China) Zhou CM	11	21	18
8	(China) Guo XW (China) Liu XX	21	17	21

=== Bottom half ===
==== Section 3 ====
First round
Q4	(China) Feng YZ (China) Lin FL	21	18	21
(Chinese Taipei) Lu C (Chinese Taipei) Li Z-q	19	21	14
(Chinese Taipei) Chi Y-j (Chinese Taipei) Lin X-m	16	21	12
6	(Singapore) D B Chrisnanta (Singapore) Tan W H	21	14	21
Q3	(South Korea) Na S-s (South Korea) Kim M-j	22	18	21
(China) Huang D (China) Chen YX	20	21	13
(Chinese Taipei) Tseng M-h (Chinese Taipei) Hsieh P-s	17	22	21
4	(Indonesia) Z J Sumanti (Indonesia) A Wiratama	21	20	8

Second round
Q4	(China) Feng YZ (China) Lin FL	19	13
6	(Singapore) D B Chrisnanta (Singapore) Tan W H	21	21
Q3	(South Korea) Na S-s (South Korea) Kim M-j	21	21
(Chinese Taipei) Tseng M-h (Chinese Taipei) Hsieh P-s	17	12

Quarter-finals
6	(Singapore) D B Chrisnanta (Singapore) Tan W H	21	21
Q3	(South Korea) Na S-s (South Korea) Kim M-j	19	16

==== Section 4 ====
First round
Q1	(China) Liang WK (China) Chen YY	21	17	21
(China) Di ZJ (China) Li YJ	18	21	19
(Hong Kong) Tang C M (Hong Kong) Ng T Y	21	21
7	(China) Chen SH (China) Zhou SQ	18	15
(China) Guo RH (China) Chen QY	21	22
(China) Xuheng ZY (China) Li JJ	17	20
(Chinese Taipei) Liu W-c (Chinese Taipei) Teng C-h	9	20
2	(China) Ou XY (China) Feng XY	21	22

Second round
Q1	(China) Liang WK (China) Chen YY	13	11
(Hong Kong) Tang C M (Hong Kong) Ng T Y	21	21
(China) Guo RH (China) Chen QY	12	13
2	(China) Ou XY (China) Feng XY	21	21

Quarter-finals
(Hong Kong) Tang C M (Hong Kong) Ng T Y	21	16	21
2	(China) Ou XY (China) Feng XY	16	21	18

Preceded by 2019 All England Open	BWF World Tour; 2019 BWF season	Succeeded by 2019 Swiss Open
