= 2023 Ruichang China Masters =

Badminton tournament in Ruichang

Tournament details
- Dates: 14–19 March
- Edition: 1st
- Level: Super 100
- Total prize money: US$120,000
- Venue: Ruichang Sports Park Gym
- Location: Ruichang, Jiangxi, China

Champions
- Men's singles: (China) Sun Feixiang
- Women's singles: (Chinese Taipei) Lin Hsiang-ti
- Men's doubles: (China) Chen Boyang (China) Liu Yi
- Women's doubles: (China) Chen Xiaofei (China) Feng Xueying
- Mixed doubles: (China) Jiang Zhenbang (China) Wei Yaxin

The 2023 Ruichang China Masters was a badminton tournament that took place in the Ruichang Sports Park Gym at Ruichang, China, from 14 to 19 March 2023. The tournament had a total prize pool of $120,000.

== Tournament ==
The 2023 Ruichang China Masters was the sixth tournament of the 2023 BWF World Tour. This was the first edition of the Ruichang China Masters. It was organized by the Chinese Badminton Association with sanction from the Badminton World Federation.

=== Venue ===
This tournament was held at the Ruichang Sports Park Gym in Ruichang, Jiangxi, China.

=== Point distribution ===
Below is the point distribution table for each phase of the tournament based on the BWF points system for the BWF Tour Super 100 event.

Winner	Runner-up	3/4	5/8	9/16	17/32	33/64	65/128	129/256
5,500	4,680	3,850	3,030	2,110	1,290	510	240	100

=== Prize pool ===
The total prize money was US$120,000 with the distribution of the prize money in accordance with BWF regulations.

Event	Winner	Finalist	Semi-finals	Quarter-finals	Last 16
Singles	$9,000	$4,560	$1,740	$720	$420
Doubles	$9,480	$4,560	$1,680	$870	$450

== Men's singles ==
=== Seeds ===
1. (Indonesia) Christian Adinata (withdrew)
2. (India) Meiraba Luwang Maisnam (third round)
3. (Malaysia) Leong Jun Hao (second round)
4. (El Salvador) Uriel Canjura (second round)
5. (Chinese Taipei) Lu Chia-hung (second round)
6. (Indonesia) Ikhsan Rumbay (withdrew)
7. (Chinese Taipei) Su Li-yang (quarter-finals)
8. (Azerbaijan) Ade Resky Dwicahyo (second round)

=== Finals ===
Semi-finals
(China) Sun Feixiang	21	21
(Malaysia) Justin Hoh	12	17
(Chinese Taipei) Liao Jhuo-fu	11	26	16
Q5	(China) Sun Chao	21	24	21

Final
(China) Sun Feixiang	21	21
Q5	(China) Sun Chao	15	14

=== Top half ===
==== Section 1 ====
First round
(Thailand) K Laotrakul	13	21	21
(India) T R Katam	21	17	14
(Canada) Wong Y K	10	14
Q3	(China) Liu ZQ	21	21
(China) Sun FX	21	21
(England) R Midha	8	9
Q6	(China) Zhu TS	11	21	18
(Malaysia) Lee S Y	21	10	21

Second round
PFQ	(China) Liu HC	18	21	21
(Thailand) K Laotrakul	21	18	10
(Malaysia) Kok J H	16	17
Q3	(China) Liu ZQ	21	21
PFQ	(Malaysia) M Chai	6	6
(China) Sun FX	21	21
(Malaysia) Aidil S	19	22	21
(Malaysia) Lee S Y	21	20	14

Third round
PFQ	(China) Liu HC	18	21	21
Q3	(China) Liu ZQ	21	17	13
(China) Sun FX	21	15	21
(Malaysia) Aidil S	12	21	12

Quarter-finals
PFQ	(China) Liu HC	21	17	10
(China) Sun FX	19	21	21

==== Section 2 ====
First round
(Hong Kong) J Gunawan	21	21
(Australia) K C Teoh	11	13
(New Zealand) R Cheng	21	21
(Canada) J Yang	19	15
PFQ	(Azerbaijan) D D Pangestu	21	21
(Chinese Taipei) Chang S-c	19	14
(India) C Sen	21	21
PFQ	(Maldives) H Z Shaheed	16	6

Second round
4	(El Salvador) U Canjura	11	21	18
(Hong Kong) J Gunawan	21	19	21
(Malaysia) J Hoh	21	21
(New Zealand) R Cheng	10	11
7	(Chinese Taipei) Su L-y	21	21
PFQ	(Azerbaijan) D D Pangestu	8	15
Q2	(China) Zhu XC	21	21
(India) C Sen	12	10

Third round
(Hong Kong) J Gunawan	21	13	18
(Malaysia) J Hoh	19	21	21
7	(Chinese Taipei) Su L-y	17	21	21
Q2	(China) Zhu XC	21	11	9

Quarter-finals
(Malaysia) J Hoh	21	21
7	(Chinese Taipei) Su L-y	15	17

=== Bottom half ===
==== Section 3 ====
First round
PFQ	(Italy) L Zhou	15	14
(Chinese Taipei) Liao J-f	21	21
PFQ	(Japan) T Kawamoto	21	21
(India) S Karunakaran	14	16
Q8	(China) Wu KA	21	19
Q4	(China) Gao ZZ	23	21
Q1	(China) Dong TY	21	9	21
(China) Lei LX	19	21	17

Second round
(Chinese Taipei) Liao J-f	21	21
Q7	(Chinese Taipei) Zhao C-x	13	18
PFQ	(Japan) T Kawamoto	21	21
5	(Chinese Taipei) Lu C-h	9	12
Q4	(China) Gao ZZ	14	21	21
(Chinese Taipei) Kuo K-l	21	12	10
Q1	(China) Dong TY	19	21	21
3	(Malaysia) Leong J H	21	17	14

Third round
(Chinese Taipei) Liao J-f	21	21
PFQ	(Japan) T Kawamoto	19	14
Q4	(China) Gao ZZ	21	21
Q1	(China) Dong TY	16	17

Quarter-finals
(Chinese Taipei) Liao J-f	10
Q4	(China) Gao ZZ	5^{r}

==== Section 4 ====
First round
(Myanmar) Phone P N	7	12
(Japan) Y Igarashi	21	21
Q5	(China) Sun C	21	21
PFQ	(Malaysia) Choo K Q	8	17
(Canada) XD Sheng	21	15
(China) Liu L	23	21
(Malaysia) Ong K Y	21	21
(United States) E Asuncion	8	9

Second round
(Japan) Y Igarashi	17	15
(Hong Kong) Chan Y C	21	21
Q5	(China) Sun C	21	21
8	(Azerbaijan) A R Dwicahyo	13	15
(China) Liu L	21	21
(Chinese Taipei) Huang YK	15	15
(Malaysia) Ong K Y	19	17
2	(India) M L Maisnam	21	21

Third round
(Hong Kong) Chan Y C	21	15	16
Q5	(China) Sun C	13	21	21
(China) Liu L	24	13	21
2	(India) M L Maisnam	22	21	10

Quarter-finals
Q5	(China) Sun C	17	21	21
(China) Liu L	21	11	17

== Women's singles ==
=== Seeds ===
1. (India) Tanya Hemanth (first round)
2. (Indonesia) Ester Nurumi Tri Wardoyo (withdrew)
3. (Chinese Taipei) Lin Hsiang-ti (champion)
4. (Thailand) Pitchamon Opatniput (second round)
5. (Hungary) Daniella Gonda (second round)
6. (Indonesia) Stephanie Widjaja (withdrew)
7. (Chinese Taipei) Liang Ting-yu (second round)
8. (China) Gao Fangjie (semi-finals)

=== Finals ===
Semi-finals
8	(China) Gao Fangjie	18	9
(China) Chen Lu	21	21
3	(Chinese Taipei) Lin Hsiang-ti	21	21	21
PFQ	(China) Dai Wang	23	19	12

Final
(China) Chen Lu	21	11	20
3	(Chinese Taipei) Lin Hsiang-ti	13	21	22

=== Top half ===
==== Section 1 ====
First round
1	(India) T Hemanth	14	18
PFQ	(China) Wu YQ	21	21
(Czech Republic) V Dobiášová	21	13	14
(Italy) Y Hamza	14	21	21
8	(China) Gao FJ	21	21
(Macau) Pui C W	10	9
PFQ	(China) Yang JR	21	21
(Italy) K Fink	14	3

Second round
(China) Wu YQ	w	/	o
(Italy) Y Hamza
8	(China) Gao FJ	21	21
PFQ	(China) Yang JR	18	15

Quarter-finals
(China) Wu YQ	11	6
8	(China) Gao FJ	21	21

==== Section 2 ====
First round
4	(Thailand) P Opatniput	21	21
(Azerbaijan) K F Azzahra	16	15
(China) Chen L	21	16	21
Q3	(China) Ruan XY	18	21	14
7	(Chinese Taipei) Liang T-y	21	21
Q4	(China) Ye ZY	12	12
(Maldives) F N Abdul Razzaq	4	6
(China) Qiu ZY	21	21

Second round
4	(Thailand) P Opatniput	15	17
(China) Chen L	21	21
7	(Chinese Taipei) Liang T-y	21	15	8
(China) Qiu ZY	18	21	21

Quarter-finals
(China) Chen L	21	18	21
(China) Qiu ZY	14	21	14

=== Bottom half ===
==== Section 3 ====
First round
(Azerbaijan) E Maftuha	14	24
PFQ	(China) Jia ZF	21	26
(India) A Annamalairaja	9	17
5	(Hungary) D Gonda	21	21
(Australia) B Teoh	7	9
(China) Cai YY	21	21
Q2	(China) Wu LT	8	11
3	(Chinese Taipei) Lin H-t	21	21

Second round
PFQ	(China) Jia ZF	21	21
5	(Hungary) D Gonda	13	11
(China) Cai YY	21	17	16
3	(Chinese Taipei) Lin H-t	11	21	21

Quarter-finals
PFQ	(China) Jia ZF	14	9
3	(Chinese Taipei) Lin H-t	21	21

==== Section 4 ====
First round
(China) Han QX	17	21	15
PFQ	(China) Zhang XR	21	16	21
Q1	(China) Zhuang Y	18	15
PFQ	(China) Sun ZC	21	21
(China) Wu LY	21	21
(Maldives) A N Abdul Razzaq	5	6
(Italy) J Mair	24	12	8
PFQ	(China) Dai W	22	21	21

Second round
PFQ	(China) Zhang XR	20	21	21
PFQ	(China) Sun ZC	22	16	14
(China) Wu LY	12	15
PFQ	(China) Dai W	21	21

Quarter-finals
PFQ	(China) Zhang XR	21	20	12
PFQ	(China) Dai W	15	22	21

== Men's doubles ==
=== Seeds ===
1. (Thailand) Tanadon Punpanich / Wachirawit Sothon (first round)
2. (Thailand) Pharanyu Kaosamaang / Worrapol Thongsa-Nga (semi-finals)
3. (Indonesia) Rayhan Fadillah / Rahmat Hidayat (withdrew)
4. (Malaysia) Nur Mohd Azriyn Ayub / Low Juan Shen (withdrew)
5. (Malaysia) Choong Hon Jian / Goh Sze Fei (quarter-finals)
6. (Malaysia) Goh V Shem / Lim Khim Wah (quarter-finals)
7. (China) Chen Boyang / Liu Yi (champions)
8. (Malaysia) Junaidi Arif / Yap Roy King (quarter-finals)

=== Finals ===
Semi-finals
(Malaysia) Beh Chun Meng (Malaysia) Goh Boon Zhe	12	14
7	(China) Chen Boyang (China) Liu Yi	21	21
(Malaysia) Nur Izzuddin (Malaysia) Muhammad Haikal	21	20	21
2	(Thailand) Pharanyu Kaosamaang (Thailand) Worrapol Thongsa-Nga	15	22	15

Final
7	(China) Chen Boyang (China) Liu Yi	21	19	21
(Malaysia) Nur Izzuddin (Malaysia) Muhammad Haikal	16	21	16

=== Top half ===
==== Section 1 ====
First round
1	(Thailand) T Punpanich (Thailand) W Sothon	14	16
(Malaysia) Beh C M (Malaysia) Goh B Z	21	21
(Malaysia) M Chai (Malaysia) Choo K Q	21	11	14
PFQ	(China) Ren CM (China) Tian YC	16	21	21
5	(Malaysia) Choong H J (Malaysia) Goh S F	w	/	o
(China) Liang YW (China) Song JL
(China) Li ZY (China) Xiang Y	21	22
(Canada) S He (Canada) J Yang	18	20

Second round
(Malaysia) Beh C M (Malaysia) Goh B Z	21	21
PFQ	(China) Ren CM (China) Tian YC	11	10
5	(Malaysia) Choong H J (Malaysia) Goh S F	21	21
(China) Li ZY (China) Xiang Y	10	9

Quarter-finals
(Malaysia) Beh C M (Malaysia) Goh B Z	21	21	22
5	(Malaysia) Choong H J (Malaysia) Goh S F	19	23	20

==== Section 2 ====
First round
PFQ	(China) Tan YX (China) Xiao SC	15	21	16
Q3	(China) Chen K (China) Zheng XJ	21	19	21
(China) Xie HN (China) Zeng WH	21	21
(Chinese Taipei) Lu M-c (Chinese Taipei) Tang K-w	17	17
7	(China) Chen BY (China) Liu Yi	21	21
(China) Chen F (China) Li JX	6	8
(Italy) L Zhou (Italy) T Zhou	15	9
(China) Guo RH (China) Zhu HY	21	21

Second round
Q3	(China) Chen K (China) Zheng XJ	11	9
(China) Xie HN (China) Zeng WH	21	21
7	(China) Chen BY (China) Liu Yi	21	21
(China) Guo RH (China) Zhu HY	17	14

Quarter-finals
(China) Xie HN (China) Zeng WH	21	9	18
7	(China) Chen BY (China) Liu Yi	19	21	21

=== Bottom half ===
==== Section 3 ====
First round
(China) Huang JW (China) Zhang N	21	21
(China) Hu CW (China) Ma MZ	15	12
(China) Huang D (China) Liu Ya	16	21	14
8	(Malaysia) J Arif (Malaysia) Yap R K	21	16	21
(China) Zhang HY (China) Zhou ZH	9	9
(Malaysia) N Izzuddin (Malaysia) M Haikal	21	21
Q1	(China) Fan JL (China) Liu ZJ	21	11	21
PFQ	(China) Deng CH (China) Lu ZR	19	21	13

Second round
(China) Huang JW (China) Zhang N	10	18
8	(Malaysia) J Arif (Malaysia) Yap R K	21	21
(Malaysia) N Izzuddin (Malaysia) M Haikal	22	21
Q1	(China) Fan JL (China) Liu ZJ	20	13

Quarter-finals
8	(Malaysia) J Arif (Malaysia) Yap R K	16	18
(Malaysia) N Izzuddin (Malaysia) M Haikal	21	21

==== Section 4 ====
First round
Q2	(China) Deng JN (China) Zhou CY	16	12
Q4	(China) Chen WJ (China) Guan ZC	21	21
(Malaysia) Chia W J (Malaysia) Liew X	18	21	19
6	(Malaysia) Goh V S (Malaysia) Lim K W	21	14	21
(China) Chen XJ (China) Peng JQ	20	17
(China) Cui HC (China) Sun WJ	22	21
(China) An JC (China) Shang YC	15	21	16
2	(Thailand) P Kaosamaang (Thailand) W Thongsa-Nga	21	18	21

Second round
Q4	(China) Chen WJ (China) Guan ZC	18	13
6	(Malaysia) Goh V S (Malaysia) Lim K W	21	21
(China) Cui HC (China) Sun WJ	10	12
2	(Thailand) P Kaosamaang (Thailand) W Thongsa-Nga	21	21

Quarter-finals
6	(Malaysia) Goh V S (Malaysia) Lim K W	11	21	19
2	(Thailand) P Kaosamaang (Thailand) W Thongsa-Nga	21	19	21

== Women's doubles ==
=== Seeds ===
1. (Chinese Taipei) Hsieh Pei-shan / Tseng Yu-chi (semi-finals)
2. (Maldives) Aminath Nabeeha Abdul Razzaq / Fathimath Nabaaha Abdul Razzaq (first round)
3. (Azerbaijan) Keisha Fatimah Azzahra / Era Maftuha (first round)
4. (Malaysia) Cheng Su Hui / Cheng Su Yin (second round)
5. (Malaysia) Go Pei Kee / Valeree Siow (quarter-finals)
6. (China) Luo Xumin / Zhou Xinru (quarter-finals)
7. (Chinese Taipei) Chung Kan-yu / Liang Ting-yu (second round)
8. (China) Li Yijing / Wang Yiduo (second round)

=== Finals ===
Semi-finals
1	(Chinese Taipei) Hsieh Pei-shan (Chinese Taipei) Tseng Yu-chi	19	12
(China) Chen Xiaofei (China) Feng Xueying	21	21
(China) Keng Shuliang (China) Zhang Chi	21	21
(China) Bao Lijing (China) Guo Yuxin	13	15

Final
(China) Chen Xiaofei (China) Feng Xueying	21	21
(China) Keng Shuliang (China) Zhang Chi	15	19

=== Top half ===
==== Section 1 ====
First round
1	(Chinese Taipei) Hsieh P-s (Chinese Taipei) Tseng Y-c	21	21
Q3	(China) Chen YX (China) Zhang JE	11	11
(China) Qiao SJ (China) Wang YY	21	21
Q4	(China) Hu SH (China) Luo Y	14	19
5	(Malaysia) Go P K (Malaysia) V Siow	21	21
(China) Cheng LL (China) Feng JL	11	17
(China) Wang H (China) Yang XY	21	21
Q1	(China) Ren XF (China) Zhang KX	18	11

Second round
1	(Chinese Taipei) Hsieh P-s (Chinese Taipei) Tseng Y-c	24	21
(China) Qiao SJ (China) Wang YY	22	15
5	(Malaysia) Go P K (Malaysia) V Siow	21	21
(China) Wang H (China) Yang XY	16	16

Quarter-finals
1	(Chinese Taipei) Hsieh P-s (Chinese Taipei) Tseng Y-c	21	21
5	(Malaysia) Go P K (Malaysia) V Siow	16	13

==== Section 2 ====
First round
3	(Azerbaijan) K F Azzahra (Azerbaijan) E Maftuha	19	22	13
(Thailand) O Jongsathapornparn (Thailand) N Samart	21	20	21
(Macau) Ng W C (Macau) Pui C W	11	10
(China) Chen XF (China) Feng XY	21	21
8	(China) Li YJ (China) Wang YD	21	21
PFQ	(China) Sun XL (China) Zha YQ	11	13
(China) Wang SQ (China) Zhang YN	4	10
(China) Liu SS (China) Tan N	21	21

Second round
(Thailand) O Jongsathapornparn (Thailand) N Samart	12	12
(China) Chen XF (China) Feng XY	21	21
8	(China) Li YJ (China) Wang YD	17	10
(China) Liu SS (China) Tan N	21	21

Quarter-finals
(China) Chen XF (China) Feng XY	21	12	21
(China) Liu SS (China) Tan N	17	21	19

=== Bottom half ===
==== Section 3 ====
First round
(China) Hua XB (China) Qian GH	18	8
(China) Fu XY (China) Zhou JR	21	21
(China) Chen QY (China) Gan DH	9	13
6	(China) Luo XM (China) Zhou XR	21	21
(China) Keng SL (China) Zhang C	21	21
(China) Wang TG (China) Wang ZM	15	16
Q2	(China) Li KX (China) Liu JY	9	11
4	(Malaysia) Cheng S H (Malaysia) Cheng S Y	21	21

Second round
(China) Fu XY (China) Zhou JR	16	9
6	(China) Luo XM (China) Zhou XR	21	21
(China) Keng SL (China) Zhang C	21	21
4	(Malaysia) Cheng S H (Malaysia) Cheng S Y	9	10

Quarter-finals
6	(China) Luo XM (China) Zhou XR	12	14
(China) Keng SL (China) Zhang C	21	21

==== Section 4 ====
First round
(China) Pan HX (China) Yan CX	10	19
(China) Bao LJ (China) Guo YX	21	21
(China) Gao KJ (China) Ye ZY	9	15
7	(Chinese Taipei) Chung K-y (Chinese Taipei) Liang T-y	21	21
(China) Chen JY (China) Zhang YH	16	13
(China) Li Y (China) Lu Y	21	21
(China) Ding KY (China) Shen SY	21	21
2	(Maldives) A N Abdul Razzaq (Maldives) F N Abdul Razzaq	12	13

Second round
(China) Bao LJ (China) Guo YX	21	21
7	(Chinese Taipei) Chung K-y (Chinese Taipei) Liang T-y	13	15
(China) Li Y (China) Lu Y	19	21	21
(China) Ding KY (China) Shen SY	21	17	16

Quarter-finals
(China) Bao LJ (China) Guo YX	20	21	21
(China) Li Y (China) Lu Y	22	10	12

== Mixed doubles ==
=== Seeds ===
1. (China) Jiang Zhenbang / Wei Yaxin (champions)
2. (China) Cheng Xing / Chen Fanghui (final)
3. (Maldives) Hussein Zayan Shaheed / Fathimath Nabaaha Abdul Razzaq (first round)
4. (Chinese Taipei) Lu Ming-che / Chung Kan-yu (second round)
5. (Thailand) Tanupat Viriyangkura / Ornnicha Jongsathapornparn (second round)
6. (China) Guo Xinwa / Zhang Chi (quarter-finals)
7. (Malaysia) Yap Roy King / Valeree Siow (quarter-finals)
8. (Malaysia) Choong Hon Jian / Go Pei Kee (first round)

=== Finals ===
Semi-finals
1	(China) Jiang Zhenbang (China) Wei Yaxin	21	21
(China) Zhang Hanyu (China) Yang Jiayi	8	17
(China) Mao Zhe (China) Liu Yuanyuan	16	14
2	(China) Cheng Xing (China) Chen Fanghui	21	21

Final
1	(China) Jiang Zhenbang (China) Wei Yaxin	21	21
2	(China) Cheng Xing (China) Chen Fanghui	15	8

=== Top half ===
==== Section 1 ====
First round
1	(China) Jiang ZB (China) Wei YX	21	21
(China) Li HG (China) Zheng YW	13	18
(China) Xu JJ (China) Wang H	21	21
(China) Zhou CY (China) Wang YY	11	14
7	(Malaysia) Yap R K (Malaysia) V Siow	21	21
(China) Guan ZC (China) Yang XY	14	13
(China) Chen F (China) Feng JL	8	16
(China) Hu KY (China) Sun XL	21	21

Second round
1	(China) Jiang ZB (China) Wei YX	21	21
(China) Xu JJ (China) Wang H	9	13
7	(Malaysia) Yap R K (Malaysia) V Siow	21	21
(China) Hu KY (China) Sun XL	15	10

Quarter-finals
1	(China) Jiang ZB (China) Wei YX	21	21
7	(Malaysia) Yap R K (Malaysia) V Siow	15	11

==== Section 2 ====
First round
4	(Chinese Taipei) Lu M-c (Chinese Taipei) Chung K-y	21	21
(China) Deng JN (China) Qiao SJ	13	15
(China) Zhang HY (China) Yang JY	21	21
(Macau) Leong I C (Macau) Ng W C	17	13
8	(Malaysia) Choong H J (Malaysia) Go P K	19	17
PFQ	(China) Zhang N (China) Cao JQ	21	21
(China) Wang ZH (China) Hu SH	20	9
(China) Ma XX (China) Li Q	22	21

Second round
4	(Chinese Taipei) Lu M-c (Chinese Taipei) Chung K-y	16	21
(China) Zhang HY (China) Yang JY	21	23
PFQ	(China) Zhang N (China) Cao JQ	21	22	21
(China) Ma XX (China) Li Q	23	20	16

Quarter-finals
(China) Zhang HY (China) Yang JY	w	/	o
PFQ	(China) Zhang N (China) Cao JQ

=== Bottom half ===
==== Section 3 ====
First round
Q3	(China) Mao Z (China) Liu YY	21	22
(China) Xiang Y (China) Wang SQ	19	20
Q1	(China) Xia HL (China) Zhang QH	7	9^{r}
5	(Thailand) T Viriyangkura (Thailand) O Jongsathapornparn	21	11
Q4	(China) Liu FX (China) Wang YL	25	21
(China) Li JX (China) Chen JY	23	14
Q2	(China) Tang YH (China) Gao YQ	21	21
3	(Maldives) H Z Shaheed (Maldives) F N Abdul Razzaq	10	13

Second round
Q3	(China) Mao Z (China) Liu YY	23	21
5	(Thailand) T Viriyangkura (Thailand) O Jongsathapornparn	21	16
Q4	(China) Liu FX (China) Wang YL	21	21
Q2	(China) Tang YH (China) Gao YQ	14	16

Quarter-finals
(China) Mao Z (China) Liu YY	21	21
Q4	(China) Liu FX (China) Wang YL	13	10

==== Section 4 ====
First round
(China) Shen XY (China) Wu MY	21	21
(China) Zhang SY (China) Yan CX	16	16
(Australia) K C Teoh (Australia) B Teoh
6	(China) Guo XW (China) Zhang C	w	/	o
(China) Chen SH (China) Zhou XR	21	19	21
(China) Wu TB (China) Feng XY	17	21	19
(China) Zhou ZH (China) Tang RZ	17	20
2	(China) Cheng X (China) Chen FH	21	22

Second round
(China) Shen XY (China) Wu MY	9	16
6	(China) Guo XW (China) Zhang C	21	21
(China) Chen SH (China) Zhou XR	12	11
2	(China) Cheng X (China) Chen FH	21	21

Quarter-finals
6	(China) Guo XW (China) Zhang C	21	17	23
2	(China) Cheng X (China) Chen FH	19	21	25

Preceded by 2023 German Open	BWF World Tour; 2023 BWF season	Succeeded by 2023 Swiss Open
