= 2025 Baoji China Masters =

Badminton tournament in China

Tournament details
- Dates: 2 – 7 September
- Edition: 2nd
- Level: Super 100
- Total prize money: US$110,000
- Venue: Baoji City Gymnasium
- Location: Baoji, China

Champions
- Men's singles: (China) Sun Chao
- Women's singles: (Thailand) Pitchamon Opatniputh
- Men's doubles: (China) Hu Keyuan (China) Lin Xiangyi
- Women's doubles: (China) Luo Yi (China) Wang Tingge
- Mixed doubles: (Thailand) Ruttanapak Oupthong (Thailand) Benyapa Aimsaard

The 2025 Baoji China Masters was a badminton tournament that took place in Baoji, China, from 2 to 7 September 2025 and had a total purse of $110,000.

== Tournament ==
The 2025 Baoji China Masters was the twentieth tournament of the 2025 BWF World Tour. This was the second edition of Baoji China Masters. The tournament was organized by the Chinese Badminton Association and sanctioned by the BWF.

=== Venue ===
This international tournament was held at the Baoji City Gymnasium in Baoji, China.

=== Point distribution ===
Below is a table with the point distribution for each phase of the tournament based on the BWF points system for the BWF Tour Super 100 event.

Winner	Runner-up	3/4	5/8	9/16	17/32	33/64	65/128	129/256
5,500	4,680	3,850	3,030	2,110	1,290	510	240	100

=== Prize money ===
The total prize money for this tournament was US$110,000. Distribution of prize money was in accordance with BWF regulations.

Event	Winner	Finals	Semi-finals	Quarter-finals	Last 16
Singles	$8,250	$4,180	$1,595	$660	$385
Doubles	$8,690	$4,180	$1,540	$797.5	$412.5

== Men's singles ==
=== Seeds ===
1. (Chinese Taipei) Su Li-yang (third round)
2. (Hong Kong) Jason Gunawan (third round)
3. (Malaysia) Aidil Sholeh (second round)
4. (India) Sankar Subramanian (second round)
5. (Chinese Taipei) Huang Ping-hsien (second round)
6. (Japan) Shogo Ogawa (second round)
7. (Chinese Taipei) Huang Yu-kai (second round)
8. (China) Zhu Xuanchen (semi-finals)

=== Finals ===
Semi-finals
(China) Liu Yuxuan	21	12	15
(China) Hu Zhe'an	19	21	21
8	(China) Zhu Xuanchen	21	16	21
(China) Sun Chao	6	21	23

Final
(China) Hu Zhe'an	21	20
(China) Sun Chao	23	22

=== Top half ===
==== Section 1 ====
First round
(Malaysia) D Chew	17	13
(Chinese Taipei) Ting Y-c	21	21
(India) G Sonna	21	21
(England) Wang Y H	14	12
(Canada) XD Sheng	16	21	11
(China) Liu YX	21	16	21
(Malaysia) Huan K H	21	21
(Australia) K C Teoh	14	11

Second round
1	(Chinese Taipei) Su L-y	21	21
(Chinese Taipei) Ting Y-c	19	15
(Japan) Y Okimoto	21	21
(India) G Sonna	11	16
5	(Chinese Taipei) Huang P-h	14	17
(China) Liu YX	21	21
(Chinese Taipei) Wang Y-k	16	12
(Malaysia) Huan K H	21	21

Third round
1	(Chinese Taipei) Su L-y	12	10
(Japan) Y Okimoto	21	21
(China) Liu YX	21	21
(Malaysia) Huan K H	11	14

Quarter-finals
(Japan) Y Okimoto	17	15
(China) Liu YX	21	21

==== Section 2 ====
First round
Q8	(South Korea) Kim H-d	21	21
(Canada) Wong H L	8	11
(Chinese Taipei) Kuo K-l	11	11
(China) Hu ZA	21	21
(Thailand) K Laotrakul	15	17
(China) Liu L	21	21
(Malaysia) Kok J H	21	21
Q5	(Australia) Xie Z	14	15

Second round
4	(India) S Subramanian	14	21	17
Q8	(South Korea) Kim H-d	21	17	21
(India) M Maisnam	16	5
(China) Hu ZA	21	21
6	(Japan) S Ogawa	16	21	19
(China) Liu L	21	18	21
Q7	(Chinese Taipei) Wu Z-y	12	16
(Malaysia) Kok J H	21	21

Third round
Q8	(South Korea) Kim H-d	14	21	18
(China) Hu ZA	21	17	21
(China) Liu L	19	15
(Malaysia) Kok J H	21	21

Quarter-finals
(China) Hu ZA	21	18	21
(Malaysia) Kok J H	11	21	17

=== Bottom half ===
==== Section 3 ====
First round
(New Zealand) E Lau	4	17
Q2	(China) Yang PY	21	21
(Chinese Taipei) Liu Y	17	17
PFQ	(Malaysia) E M Hajibeigy	21	21
(China) Zhou XY	19	24	21
(Malaysia) Chua K S	21	22	12
(Macau) Pui P F	10	24
(China) Dong TY	21	26

Second round
Q2	(China) Yang PY	14	17
(China) Wang ZJ	21	21
PFQ	(Malaysia) E M Hajibeigy	13	9
8	(China) Zhu XC	21	21
(China) Zhou XY	21	17	21
(Chinese Taipei) Wang P-w	13	21	13
(China) Dong TY	21	21
3	(Malaysia) Aidil S	17	14

Third round
(China) Wang ZJ	20	14
8	(China) Zhu XC	22	21
(China) Zhou XY	18	21	18
(China) Dong TY	21	17	21

Quarter-finals
8	(China) Zhu XC	18	21	22
(China) Dong TY	21	11	20

==== Section 4 ====
First round
(Canada) S Gullaiya	21	18	18
Q4	(Malaysia) Low E C	17	21	21
(Malaysia) Cheam J W	23	21
Q3	(Chinese Taipei) Lu W-h	21	12
(China) Sun C	21	21
Q1	(Chinese Taipei) Tu H-t	9	7
Q6	(China) Liu HD	21	21
(Australia) R Tang	17	17

Second round
Q4	(Malaysia) Low E C	13	18
(Malaysia) Tan J J	21	21
(Malaysia) Cheam J W	21	21
7	(Chinese Taipei) Huang Y-k	10	6
(China) Sun C	9	21	21
(Chinese Taipei) Liao J-f	21	18	15
Q6	(China) Liu HD	13	8
2	(Hong Kong) J Gunawan	21	21

Third round
(Malaysia) Tan J J	18	23	21
(Malaysia) Cheam J W	21	21	9
(China) Sun C	21	21
2	(Hong Kong) J Gunawan	15	14

Quarter-finals
(Malaysia) Tan J J	15	10
(China) Sun C	21	21

== Women's singles ==
=== Seeds ===
1. (Japan) Nozomi Okuhara (second round)
2. (Thailand) Pitchamon Opatniputh (champion)
3. (Chinese Taipei) Huang Yu-hsun (quarter-finals)
4. (Chinese Taipei) Huang Ching-ping (semi-finals)
5. (China) Wu Luoyu (quarter-finals)
6. (India) Tanya Hemanth (quarter-finals)
7. (Chinese Taipei) Chen Su-yu (first round)
8. (China) Zhang Yiman (first round)

=== Finals ===
Semi-finals
Q4	(China) Zheng Xinyan	21	21
(China) Xu Wenjing	18	18
4	(Chinese Taipei) Huang Ching-ping	7	11
2	(Thailand) Pitchamon Opatniputh	21	21

Final
Q4	(China) Zheng Xinyan	16	21	7
2	(Thailand) Pitchamon Opatniputh	21	18	21

=== Top half ===
==== Section 1 ====
First round
1	(Japan) N Okuhara	21	12	21
Q1	(China) Yang JR	19	21	17
(Chinese Taipei) Wang P-y	18	22
(China) Cai YY	21	24
7	(Chinese Taipei) Chen S-y	21	16	10
(Malaysia) Kisona S	10	21	21
Q4	(China) Zheng XY	21	21
(Thailand) N Rattanapanuwong	10	10

Second round
1	(Japan) N Okuhara	21	21	18
(China) Cai YY	23	14	21
(Malaysia) Kisona S	14	17
Q4	(China) Zheng XY	21	21

Quarter-finals
(China) Cai YY	17	16
Q4	(China) Zheng XY	21	21

==== Section 2 ====
First round
3	(Chinese Taipei) Huang Y-h	21	21
Q3	(China) Guo XY	19	7
(China) Luo SX	21	21
(India) I Negi	13	14
8	(China) Zhang YM	16	21	10
(China) Xu WJ	21	18	21
(Republic of Ireland) S Noble	18	14
(Hong Kong) Liang K W	21	21

Second round
3	(Chinese Taipei) Huang Y-h	21	21
(China) Luo SX	12	18
(China) Xu WJ	21	21
(Hong Kong) Liang K W	13	16

Quarter-finals
3	(Chinese Taipei) Huang Y-h	17	21	13
(China) Xu WJ	21	19	21

=== Bottom half ===
==== Section 3 ====
First round
(Australia) K Q Teoh	17	21	17
(Macau) Pui C W	21	14	21
(Chinese Taipei) Han Y-c	13	21
5	(China) Wu LY	21	23
(New Zealand) S Li	13	12
(Hong Kong) Yeung S Y	21	21
(Chinese Taipei) Lin S-s	15	19
4	(Chinese Taipei) Huang C-p	21	21

Second round
(Macau) Pui C W	12	9
5	(China) Wu LY	21	21
(Hong Kong) Yeung S Y	18	11
4	(Chinese Taipei) Huang C-p	21	21

Quarter-finals
5	(China) Wu LY	16	21	17
4	(Chinese Taipei) Huang C-p	21	12	21

==== Section 4 ====
First round
(Chinese Taipei) Huang Y-w	21	18	21
(United States) I Rusli	18	21	12
(Chinese Taipei) Wang Y-s	17	21	20
6	(India) T Hemanth	21	13	22
(China) Yin YQ	22	21
(China) Dai QY	20	15
(China) Jia ZF	13	13
2	(Thailand) P Opatniputh	21	21

Second round
(Chinese Taipei) Huang Y-w	12	18
6	(India) T Hemanth	21	21
(China) Yin YQ	21	8	17
2	(Thailand) P Opatniputh	18	21	21

Quarter-finals
6	(India) T Hemanth	18	17
2	(Thailand) P Opatniputh	21	21

== Men's doubles ==
=== Seeds ===
1. (Chinese Taipei) He Zhi-wei / Huang Jui-hsuan (first round)
2. (Chinese Taipei) Chen Zhi-ray / Lin Yu-chieh (second round)
3. (Chinese Taipei) Lai Po-yu / Tsai Fu-cheng (first round)
4. (Chinese Taipei) Chang Ko-chi / Po Li-wei (quarter-finals)
5. (China) Cui Hechen / Peng Jianqin (quarter-finals)
6. (Malaysia) Kang Khai Xing / Aaron Tai (first round)
7. (Malaysia) Chia Wei Jie / Lwi Sheng Hao (second round)
8. (Chinese Taipei) Su Ching-heng / Wu Guan-xun (semi-finals)

=== Finals ===
Semi-finals
PFQ	(Chinese Taipei) Cheng Kai-wen (Chinese Taipei) Liao Chao-pang	18	12
(China) Hu Keyuan (China) Lin Xiangyi	21	21
8	(Chinese Taipei) Su Ching-heng (Chinese Taipei) Wu Guan-xun	23	18	17
Q2	(China) Deng Haoxuan (China) Xu Jiajun	21	21	21

Final
(China) Hu Keyuan (China) Lin Xiangyi	21	21
Q2	(China) Deng Haoxuan (China) Xu Jiajun	13	17

=== Top half ===
==== Section 1 ====
First round
1	(Chinese Taipei) He Z-w (Chinese Taipei) Huang J-h	17	16
(Malaysia) B Goonting (Malaysia) Fazriq R	21	21
(Spain) R García (Spain) C Piris	24	15
PFQ	(Chinese Taipei) Cheng K-w (Chinese Taipei) Liao C-p	26	21
7	(Malaysia) Chia W J (Malaysia) Lwi S H	21	21
Q4	(China) Xu HY (China) Zhang LJ	17	17
(Malaysia) Lau Y S (Malaysia) Lim T J	18	21	18
(Chinese Taipei) Lin C-y (Chinese Taipei) Lin Y-s	21	11	21

Second round
(Malaysia) B Goonting (Malaysia) Fazriq R	18	13
PFQ	(Chinese Taipei) Cheng K-w (Chinese Taipei) Liao C-p	21	21
7	(Malaysia) Chia W J (Malaysia) Lwi S H	19	11
(Chinese Taipei) Lin C-y (Chinese Taipei) Lin Y-s	21	21

Quarter-finals
PFQ	(Chinese Taipei) Cheng K-w (Chinese Taipei) Liao C-p	24	21
(Chinese Taipei) Lin C-y (Chinese Taipei) Lin Y-s	22	13

==== Section 2 ====
First round
3	(Chinese Taipei) Lai P-y (Chinese Taipei) Tsai F-c	16	15
Q3	(China) Xu MWT (China) Zhu YP	21	21
(China) Hu KY (China) Lin XY	21	21
(Chinese Taipei) Chen S-f (Chinese Taipei) Lu C	13	15
5	(China) Cui HC (China) Peng JQ	21	21
(Malaysia) Beh C M (Malaysia) Choi J S	17	12
(China) Chen XJ (China) Guo RH	21	21
(Thailand) T Madee (Thailand) W Sothon	14	15

Second round
Q3	(China) Xu MWT (China) Zhu YP	15	13
(China) Hu KY (China) Lin XY	21	21
5	(China) Cui HC (China) Peng JQ	21	18	21
(China) Chen XJ (China) Guo RH	17	21	19

Quarter-finals
(China) Hu KY (China) Lin XY	21	21	21
5	(China) Cui HC (China) Peng JQ	11	23	18

=== Bottom half ===
==== Section 3 ====
First round
(China) Liao PY (China) Zhu YJ	21	21
Q1	(China) Lin YF (China) Ma S	19	13
(Chinese Taipei) Chiu T-h (Chinese Taipei) Lu C-y	14	21	10
8	(Chinese Taipei) Su C-h (Chinese Taipei) Wu G-x	21	16	21
(Malaysia) Boon X Y (Malaysia) Lee Y B	21	16	19
(Chinese Taipei) Huang T-i (Chinese Taipei) Lin T-y	19	21	21
(Thailand) T Jintamuttha (Thailand) W Thongsa-nga	19	21
4	(Chinese Taipei) Chang K-c (Chinese Taipei) Po L-w	21	23

Second round
(China) Liao PY (China) Zhu YJ	21	17
8	(Chinese Taipei) Su C-h (Chinese Taipei) Wu G-x	23	21
(Chinese Taipei) Huang T-i (Chinese Taipei) Lin T-y	21	19	19
4	(Chinese Taipei) Chang K-c (Chinese Taipei) Po L-w	19	21	21

Quarter-finals
8	(Chinese Taipei) Su C-h (Chinese Taipei) Wu G-x	21	21
4	(Chinese Taipei) Chang K-c (Chinese Taipei) Po L-w	15	19

==== Section 4 ====
First round
Q2	(China) Deng HX (China) Xu JJ	15	21	21
(Spain) D Franco (Spain) R Sanjurjo	21	17	11
(Malaysia) M Faiq (Malaysia) Lok H Q	21	21
6	(Malaysia) Kang K X (Malaysia) A Tai	17	12
(China) Chen YR (China) Chen ZH	21	21
(Spain) J Fernández (Spain) A Perals	16	9
(Thailand) P Kaosamaang (Thailand) T Punpanich	16	13
2	(Chinese Taipei) Chen Z-r (Chinese Taipei) Lin Y-c	21	21

Second round
Q2	(China) Deng HX (China) Xu JJ	21	21
(Malaysia) M Faiq (Malaysia) Lok H Q	16	18
(China) Chen YR (China) Chen ZH	21	15	21
2	(Chinese Taipei) Chen Z-r (Chinese Taipei) Lin Y-c	17	21	18

Quarter-finals
Q2	(China) Deng HX (China) Xu JJ	21	21
(China) Chen YR (China) Chen ZH	18	19

== Women's doubles ==
=== Seeds ===
1. (Chinese Taipei) Lin Xiao-min / Wang Yu-qiao (semi-finals)
2. (Chinese Taipei) Lee Chih-chen / Lin Yen-yu (second round)
3. (Spain) Paula López / Lucía Rodríguez (second round)
4. (Spain) Nikol Carulla / Carmen Jiménez (second round)
5. (China) Bao Lijing / Li Huazhou (second round)
6. (China) Liao Lixi / Wang Yuyan (quarter-finals)
7. (China) Liu Xuanxuan / Wang Zimeng (semi-finals)
8. (China) Liu Jiayue / Wang Yiduo (quarter-finals)

=== Finals ===
Semi-finals
1	(Chinese Taipei) Lin Xiao-min (Chinese Taipei) Wang Yu-qiao	12	21	21
(China) Qiao Shijun (China) Zheng Yu	21	18	23
7	(China) Liu Xuanxuan (China) Wang Zimeng	20	16
(China) Luo Yi (China) Wang Tingge	22	21

Final
(China) Qiao Shijun (China) Zheng Yu	21	21	15
(China) Luo Yi (China) Wang Tingge	17	23	21

=== Top half ===
==== Section 1 ====
First round
(Chinese Taipei) Chen H-t (Chinese Taipei) Chen Y-h	21	21
(China) Cao YX (China) Wei YY	18	12

Second round
1	(Chinese Taipei) Lin X-m (Chinese Taipei) Wang Y-q	21	19	21
(China) Ding KY (China) Shen SY	17	21	12
8	(China) Liu JY (China) Wang YD	21	21
(Chinese Taipei) Chen H-t (Chinese Taipei) Chen Y-h	5	14

Quarter-finals
1	(Chinese Taipei) Lin X-m (Chinese Taipei) Wang Y-q	28	21	21
8	(China) Liu JY (China) Wang YD	30	17	14

==== Section 2 ====
First round
(China) Qian ZY (China) Shao JN	20	17
(China) Qiao SJ (China) Zheng Y	22	21
(Macau) Ng W C (Macau) Pui C W	21	21	18
(Hong Kong) Cheung Y Y (Hong Kong) Leung S L	23	18	21

Second round
3	(Spain) P López (Spain) L Rodríguez	16	14
(China) Qiao SJ (China) Zheng Y	21	21
6	(China) Liao LX (China) Wang YY	21	21
(Hong Kong) Cheung Y Y (Hong Kong) Leung S L	10	14

Quarter-finals
(China) Qiao SJ (China) Zheng Y	21	21
6	(China) Liao LX (China) Wang YY	10	12

=== Bottom half ===
==== Section 3 ====
First round
(China) Zhang YH (China) Zheng YW	21	21
(China) Liu YC (China) Pang JE	13	17
(China) Huang KX (China) Tang RZ	19	21	21
(Chinese Taipei) Chen Y-h (Chinese Taipei) Liu C-y	21	13	12

Second round
(China) Zhang YH (China) Zheng YW	10	13
7	(China) Liu XX (China) Wang ZM	21	21
(China) Huang KX (China) Tang RZ	21	21
4	(Spain) N Carulla (Spain) C Jiménez	15	13

Quarter-finals
7	(China) Liu XX (China) Wang ZM	9	21	21
(China) Huang KX (China) Tang RZ	21	18	14

==== Section 4 ====
First round
(Malaysia) Cheng S H (Malaysia) Tan Z Y	15	18
(China) Chen XF (China) Feng XY	21	21
(China) Luo Y (China) Wang TG	21	12	21
(China) Chen YY (China) Yan CX	13	21	15

Second round
(China) Chen XF (China) Feng XY	17	22	21
5	(China) Bao LJ (China) Li HZ	21	20	15
(China) Luo Y (China) Wang TG	21	21
2	(Chinese Taipei) Lee C-c (Chinese Taipei) Lin Y-y	13	15

Quarter-finals
(China) Chen XF (China) Feng XY	10	20
(China) Luo Y (China) Wang TG	21	22

== Mixed doubles ==
=== Seeds ===
1. (Spain) Rubén García / Lucía Rodríguez (first round)
2. (Indonesia) Bobby Setiabudi / Melati Daeva Oktavianti (quarter-finals)
3. (Thailand) Phuwanat Horbanluekit / Fungfa Korpthammakit (first round)
4. (Macau) Leong Iok Chong / Ng Weng Chi (second round)
5. (China) Zhu Yijun / Li Qian (final)
6. (Malaysia) Jimmy Wong / Lai Pei Jing (semi-finals)
7. (China) Liao Pinyi / Tang Ruizhi (second round)
8. (Thailand) Ruttanapak Oupthong / Benyapa Aimsaard (champions)

=== Finals ===
Semi-finals
5	(China) Zhu Yijun (China) Li Qian	18	21	21
6	(Malaysia) Jimmy Wong (Malaysia) Lai Pei Jing	21	19	10
(Chinese Taipei) Wu Guan-xun (Chinese Taipei) Lee Chia-hsin	16	18
8	(Thailand) Ruttanapak Oupthong (Thailand) Benyapa Aimsaard	21	21

Final
5	(China) Zhu Yijun (China) Li Qian	17	16
8	(Thailand) Ruttanapak Oupthong (Thailand) Benyapa Aimsaard	21	21

=== Top half ===
==== Section 1 ====
First round
1	(Spain) R García (Spain) L Rodríguez	5	21	16
(China) Zhang HY (China) Liu JY	21	8	21
Q2	(China) Wu TB (China) Chen L	21	18	21
Q4	(China) Shen XY (China) Yang JY	14	21	19
5	(China) Zhu YJ (China) Li Q	21	21
(Chinese Taipei) Lai P-y (Chinese Taipei) Lin X-m	19	16
Q3	(China) Xia HL (China) Wang ZM	21	22
(Australia) R Tang (Canada) C Choi	14	20

Second round
(China) Zhang HY (China) Liu JY	14	21	21
Q2	(China) Wu TB (China) Chen L	21	14	19
5	(China) Zhu YJ (China) Li Q	24	19	21
Q3	(China) Xia HL (China) Wang ZM	22	21	18

Quarter-finals
(China) Zhang HY (China) Liu JY	21	7	16
5	(China) Zhu YJ (China) Li Q	16	21	21

==== Section 2 ====
First round
3	(Thailand) P Horbanluekit (Thailand) F Korpthammakit	17	21	19
(Malaysia) Liew X (Malaysia) Ho L E	21	16	21
(New Zealand) E Lau (New Zealand) S Li	12	21	15
(Chinese Taipei) Ho W-h (Chinese Taipei) Chen Y-h	21	13	21
6	(Malaysia) J Wong (Malaysia) Lai P J	21	21
(China) Lin XY (China) Liao LX	14	19
(Malaysia) Wee Y T (Malaysia) C San	16	21	15
(Malaysia) Wee Y H (Malaysia) Chan W T	21	14	21

Second round
(Malaysia) Liew X (Malaysia) Ho L E	21	21
(Chinese Taipei) Ho W-h (Chinese Taipei) Chen Y-h	8	15
6	(Malaysia) J Wong (Malaysia) Lai P J	21	21
(Malaysia) Wee Y H (Malaysia) Chan W T	16	17

Quarter-finals
(Malaysia) Liew X (Malaysia) Ho L E	14	21	16
6	(Malaysia) J Wong (Malaysia) Lai P J	21	17	21

=== Bottom half ===
==== Section 3 ====
First round
(Spain) R Sanjurjo (Spain) N Carulla	16	15
(Chinese Taipei) Wu G-x (Chinese Taipei) Lee C-h	21	21
Q1	(China) Luo YJ (China) Cao YX	18	17
7	(China) Liao PY (China) Tang RZ	21	21
(Spain) D Franco (Spain) C M Jiménez	21	16	18
(Chinese Taipei) Chen S-f (Chinese Taipei) Lee C-c	19	21	21
(Malaysia) O Ting (Malaysia) Yap Y	19	20
4	(Macau) Leong I C (Macau) Ng W C	21	22

Second round
(Chinese Taipei) Wu G-x (Chinese Taipei) Lee C-h	21	21
7	(China) Liao PY (China) Tang RZ	11	19
(Chinese Taipei) Chen S-f (Chinese Taipei) Lee C-c	21	21
4	(Macau) Leong I C (Macau) Ng W C	18	14

Quarter-finals
(Chinese Taipei) Wu G-x (Chinese Taipei) Lee C-h	20	21	21
(Chinese Taipei) Chen S-f (Chinese Taipei) Lee C-c	22	16	15

==== Section 4 ====
First round
(Chinese Taipei) Lu C (Chinese Taipei) Lin Y-y	21	21
(China) Ma XX (China) Liu YY	17	17
(Malaysia) Tan K W (Malaysia) Tan S T	11	10
8	(Thailand) R Oupthong (Thailand) B Aimsaard	21	21
(Malaysia) Too M Y (Malaysia) Lee Y S	21	21
(Australia) K C Teoh (Australia) K Q Teoh	13	8
(Chinese Taipei) Cheng K-w (Chinese Taipei) Liu C-y	17	20
2	(Indonesia) B Setiabudi (Indonesia) M D Oktavianti	21	22

Second round
(Chinese Taipei) Lu C (Chinese Taipei) Lin Y-y	15	12
8	(Thailand) R Oupthong (Thailand) B Aimsaard	21	21
(Malaysia) Too M Y (Malaysia) Lee Y S	12	4
2	(Indonesia) B Setiabudi (Indonesia) M D Oktavianti	21	21

Quarter-finals
8	(Thailand) R Oupthong (Thailand) B Aimsaard	17	21	21
2	(Indonesia) B Setiabudi (Indonesia) M D Oktavianti	21	15	17

Preceded by 2025 Macau Open	BWF World Tour; 2025 BWF season	Succeeded by 2025 Hong Kong Open; 2025 Vietnam Open
