= 2024 Ruichang China Masters =

Badminton tournament in China

Tournament details
- Dates: 19–24 March
- Edition: 2nd
- Level: Super 100
- Total prize money: US$120,000
- Venue: Ruichang Sports Park Gym
- Location: Ruichang, China

Champions
- Men's singles: (China) Wang Zhengxing
- Women's singles: (Japan) Kaoru Sugiyama
- Men's doubles: (China) Tan Qiang (China) Zhou Haodong
- Women's doubles: (Thailand) Laksika Kanlaha (Thailand) Phataimas Muenwong
- Mixed doubles: (China) Zhou Zhihong (China) Yang Jiayi

The 2024 Ruichang China Masters (officially known as the Ruichang China Masters 2024) is a badminton tournament that will take place at the Ruichang Sports Park Gym, Ruichang, China, from 19 to 24 March 2024 and has a total prize of US$120,000.

== Tournament ==
The 2024 Ruichang China Masters is the tenth tournament of the 2024 BWF World Tour and was part of the Ruichang China Masters championships, which had been held since 2023. This tournament was organized by the Chinese Badminton Association with sanction from the BWF.

=== Venue ===
This tournament will be held at the Ruichang Sports Park Gym in Ruichang, China.

=== Point distribution ===
Below is the point distribution table for each phase of the tournament based on the BWF points system for the BWF Tour Super 100 event.

Winner	Runner-up	3/4	5/8	9/16	17/32	33/64	65/128
5,500	4,680	3,850	3,030	2,110	1,290	510	240

=== Prize pool ===
The total prize money is US$120,000 with the distribution of the prize money in accordance with BWF regulations.

Event	Winner	Finalist	Semi-finals	Quarter-finals	Last 16
Singles	$9,000	$4,560	$1,740	$720	$420
Doubles	$9,480	$4,560	$1,680	$870	$450

== Men's singles ==
=== Seeds ===
1. (Indonesia) Shesar Hiren Rhustavito (semi-finals)
2. (India) Ayush Shetty (quarter-finals)
3. (Chinese Taipei) Wang Po-wei (third round)
4. (Hong Kong) Chan Yin Chak (quarter-finals)
5. (Vietnam) Nguyễn Hải Đăng (second round)
6. (Hong Kong) Jason Gunawan (second round)
7. (Japan) Riku Hatano (quarter-finals)
8. (Chinese Taipei) Kuo Kuan-lin (quarter-finals)

=== Finals ===
Semi-finals
1	(Indonesia) Shesar Hiren Rhustavito	9	5
(China) Liu Liang	21	21
(China) Wang Zhengxing	21	21
(China) Dong Tianyao	16	6

Final
(China) Liu Liang	19	21	17
(China) Wang Zhengxing	21	17	21

=== Top half ===
==== Section 1 ====
First round
(India) K Gulshan Kumar	21	21
(Australia) R Tang	18	8
Q4	(China) Wu KA	18	24	21
(Singapore) J Koh	21	22	13
(Chinese Taipei) Ting Y-c	16	21	16
(Japan) T Kawamoto	21	19	21
(Chinese Taipei) Yang Y	21	21
(England) L Pong	16	13

Second round
1	(Indonesia) S H Rhustavito	21	21
(India) K Gulshan Kumar	9	15
(Malaysia) Lim M H	15
Q4	(China) Wu KA	7^{r}
8	(Chinese Taipei) Kuo K-l	8	21	21
(Japan) T Kawamoto	21	16	11
(India) R Mariswamy	13	13
(Chinese Taipei) Yang Y	21	21

Third round
1	(Indonesia) S H Rhustavito	21	23
(Malaysia) Lim M H	14	21
8	(Chinese Taipei) Kuo K-l	24	16	21
(Chinese Taipei) Yang Y	22	21	17

Quarter-finals
1	(Indonesia) S H Rhustavito	21	21
8	(Chinese Taipei) Kuo K-l	17	14

==== Section 2 ====
First round
(Sri Lanka) D Abeywickrama	15	16
(Malaysia) Huan K H	21	21
(Thailand) P Teeraratsakul	21	21
Q2	(India) S Dayanand Shimoga	18	13
(China) Liu L	21	21
(Chinese Taipei) Tsai C-h	10	18
(Indonesia) I Rumbay	9	19
Q3	(Chinese Taipei) Cheng K	21	21

Second round
4	(Hong Kong) Chan Y C	21	21
(Malaysia) Huan K H	9	15
(Maldives) A Nibal	6	10
(Thailand) P Teeraratsakul	21	21
5	(Vietnam) Nguyễn H Đ	19	10
(China) Liu L	21	21
(Indonesia) K A Nugraha	21	15	21
Q3	(Chinese Taipei) Cheng K	12	21	23

Third round
4	(Hong Kong) Chan Y C	21	21
(Thailand) P Teeraratsakul	15	18
(China) Liu L	21	21
Q3	(Chinese Taipei) Cheng K	15	15

Quarter-finals
4	(Hong Kong) Chan Y C	13	21	18
(China) Liu L	21	16	21

=== Bottom half ===
==== Section 3 ====
First round
(Canada) XD Sheng	21	21
(Japan) S Ogawa	17	19
(Thailand) K Laotrakul	13	14
Q7	(Japan) D Tanioka	21	21
Q5	(Thailand) N Pusri	21	21
(Maldives) H Z Shaheed	10	8
(Thailand) R Srithong	15	11
(Myanmar) Naing Phone P	21	21

Second round
(Canada) XD Sheng	21	21
(United Arab Emirates) S Romdhani	17	16
Q7	(Japan) D Tanioka	18	6
7	(Japan) R Hatano	21	21
Q5	(Thailand) N Pusri	16	22
(China) Wang ZX	21	24
(Myanmar) Naing Phone P	16	16
3	(Chinese Taipei) Wang P-w	21	21

Third round
(Canada) XD Sheng	16	14
7	(Japan) R Hatano	21	21
(China) Wang ZX	21	21
3	(Chinese Taipei) Wang P-w	10	8

Quarter-finals
7	(Japan) R Hatano	20	8
(China) Wang ZX	22	21

==== Section 4 ====
First round
Q8	(China) Liu ZQ	21	19	19
(Chinese Taipei) Chen C-t	16	21	21
(Timor-Leste) R Sing	6	5
(China) Dong TY	21	21
Q1	(Chinese Taipei) Ma C-y	21	21
(Australia) Teoh K C	10	13
(Japan) K Moriguchi	14	21	21
(Macau) Pui P F	21	7	15

Second round
(Chinese Taipei) Chen C-t	21	21
Q6	(Australia) Xie ZW	12	6
(China) Dong TY	21	21
6	(Hong Kong) J Gunawan	15	16
Q1	(Chinese Taipei) Ma C-y	13	18
(Chinese Taipei) Huang Y	21	21
(Japan) K Moriguchi	15	21	20
2	(India) A Shetty	21	15	22

Third round
(Chinese Taipei) Chen C-t	19	20
(China) Dong TY	21	22
(Chinese Taipei) Huang Y	16	21	21
2	(India) A Shetty	21	13	23

Quarter-finals
(China) Dong TY	21	18	21
2	(India) A Shetty	9	21	16

== Women's singles ==
=== Seeds ===
1. (Malaysia) Letshanaa Karupathevan (second round)
2. (Chinese Taipei) Chiu Pin-chian (final)
3. (Malaysia) Wong Ling Ching (first round)
4. (Chinese Taipei) Huang Ching-ping (second round)
5. (Chinese Taipei) Lin Sih-yun (second round)
6. (Malaysia) Kisona Selvaduray (second round)
7. (Japan) Akari Kurihara (first round)
8. (Chinese Taipei) Lee Yu-hsuan (first round)

=== Finals ===
Semi-finals
(Japan) Kaoru Sugiyama	23	21	21
Q2	(China) Qiu Ziying	25	17	9
(China) Dai Wang	13	25	21
2	(Chinese Taipei) Chiu Pin-chian	21	23	23

Final
(Japan) Kaoru Sugiyama	21	14	21
2	(Chinese Taipei) Chiu Pin-chian	14	21	13

=== Top half ===
==== Section 1 ====
First round
1	(Malaysia) Letshanaa K	21	21
(Malaysia) K Radhakrishnan	11	16
Q1	(China) Han QX	21	21
Q3	(China) Yang JR	13	11
7	(Japan) A Kurihara	11	20
(China) Wu LY	21	22
(Malaysia) J Ng	10	16
(Japan) K Sugiyama	21	21

Second round
1	(Malaysia) Letshanaa K	21	18
Q1	(China) Han QX	23	21
(China) Wu LY	8	15
(Japan) K Sugiyama	21	21

Quarter-finals
Q1	(China) Han QX	16	19
(Japan) K Sugiyama	21	21

==== Section 2 ====
First round
4	(Chinese Taipei) Huang C-p	21	21
(Indonesia) Y Y Susanto	15	13
Q2	(China) Qui ZY	21	21
(Australia) Teoh K Q	8	9
8	(Chinese Taipei) Lee Y-h	16	8
(Chinese Taipei) Tung C-t	21	21
Q4	(China) Zhang XR	21	21
(Chinese Taipei) Chen S-y	18	13

Second round
4	(Chinese Taipei) Huang C-p	20	21	20
Q2	(China) Qui ZY	22	19	22
(Chinese Taipei) Tung C-t	21	18	9
Q4	(China) Zhang XR	18	21	21

Quarter-finals
Q2	(China) Qui ZY	21	21
Q4	(China) Zhang XR	18	14

=== Bottom half ===
==== Section 3 ====
First round
(Vietnam) Vũ T A T	21	21
(Chinese Taipei) Peng Y-w	16	12
(Singapore) Insyirah K	14	23
6	(Malaysia) Kisona S	21	25
(Thailand) N Rattanapanuwong	11	7
(Vietnam) Vũ T T	21	21
(China) Dai W	21	21
3	(Malaysia) Wong L C	12	16

Second round
(Vietnam) Vũ T A T	21	11
6	(Malaysia) Kisona S	9	3^{r}
(Vietnam) Vũ T T	13	13
(China) Dai W	21	21

Quarter-finals
(Vietnam) Vũ T A T	14	19
(China) Dai W	21	21

==== Section 4 ====
First round
(Japan) R Gunji	18	19
(Chinese Taipei) Yang Y-c	21	21
(United Arab Emirates) N R Azzahra	23	15	15
5	(Chinese Taipei) Lin S-y	21	21	21
(Malaysia) Loh Z W	16	18
(Chinese Taipei) Hung Y-t	21	21
PFQ	(Chinese Taipei) Han Y-c	12	11
2	(Chinese Taipei) Chiu P-c	21	21

Second round
(Chinese Taipei) Yang Y-c	21	21
5	(Chinese Taipei) Lin S-y	14	14
(Chinese Taipei) Hung Y-t	20	17
2	(Chinese Taipei) Chiu P-c	22	21

Quarter-finals
(Chinese Taipei) Yang Y-c	15	16
2	(Chinese Taipei) Chiu P-c	21	21

== Men's doubles ==
=== Seeds ===
1. (Thailand) Peeratchai Sukphun / Pakkapon Teeraratsakul (second round)
2. (Malaysia) Lwi Sheng Hao / Jimmy Wong (second round)
3. (Chinese Taipei) Chiang Chien-wei / Wu Hsuan-yi (final)
4. (China) Tan Qiang / Zhou Haodong (champions)
5. (Chinese Taipei) Lin Bing-wei / Su Ching-heng (semi-finals)
6. (Japan) Kazuki Shibata / Naoki Yamada (quarter-finals)
7. (Thailand) Sirawit Sothon / Natthapat Trinkajee (first round)
8. (Malaysia) Nur Mohd Azriyn Ayub / Tan Wee Kiong (quarter-finals)

=== Finals ===
Semi-finals
(China) Cui Hechen (China) Peng Jianqin	16	17
3	(Chinese Taipei) Chiang Chien-wei (Chinese Taipei) Wu Hsuan-yi	21	21
4	(China) Tan Qiang (China) Zhou Haodong	21	21
5	(Chinese Taipei) Lin Bing-wei (Chinese Taipei) Su Ching-heng	12	17

Final
3	(Chinese Taipei) Chiang Chien-wei (Chinese Taipei) Wu Hsuan-yi	18	15
4	(China) Tan Qiang (China) Zhou Haodong	21	21

=== Top half ===
==== Section 1 ====
First round
1	(Thailand) P Sukphun (Thailand) P Teeraratsakul	12	21	21
(China) Pan YH (China) Ren CM	21	9	14
(China) Yao ZD (China) Zhang N	18	17
(China) Chen XJ (China) Guo RH	21	21
7	(Thailand) S Sothon (Thailand) N Trinkajee	5	17
(China) Cui HC (China) Peng JQ	21	21
(China) Liu ZJ (China) Xu JJ	13	15
(Thailand) T Punpanich (Thailand) W Sothon	21	21

Second round
1	(Thailand) P Sukphun (Thailand) P Teeraratsakul	21	20	18
(China) Chen XJ (China) Guo RH	17	22	21
(China) Cui HC (China) Peng JQ	21	17	21
(Thailand) T Punpanich (Thailand) W Sothon	17	21	9

Quarter-finals
(China) Chen XJ (China) Guo RH	16	21	17
(China) Cui HC (China) Peng JQ	21	16	21

==== Section 2 ====
First round
3	(Chinese Taipei) Chiang C-w (Chinese Taipei) Wu H-y	21	21
(Malaysia) Lau Y S (Malaysia) Lee Y B	13	15
(India) D S Konthoujam (India) A Mohammad	14	9
(China) Deng CH (China) Fan JL	21	21
8	(Malaysia) N M Azriyn A (Malaysia) Tan W K	21	21
(Chinese Taipei) He Z-w (Chinese Taipei) Huang J-h	19	17
Q4	(Malaysia) Lim T J (Malaysia) Wong T C	19	21	18
Q1	(China) Sun WJ (China) Zhu YJ	21	18	21

Second round
3	(Chinese Taipei) Chiang C-w (Chinese Taipei) Wu H-y	11	21	21
(China) Deng CH (China) Fan JL	21	18	9
8	(Malaysia) N M Azriyn A (Malaysia) Tan W K	25	8	21
Q1	(China) Sun WJ (China) Zhu YJ	23	21	15

Quarter-finals
3	(Chinese Taipei) Chiang C-w (Chinese Taipei) Wu H-y	22	21
8	(Malaysia) N M Azriyn A (Malaysia) Tan W K	20	18

=== Bottom half ===
==== Section 3 ====
First round
Q2	(Chinese Taipei) Cheng K-w (Chinese Taipei) Liao C-p	21	21
(Japan) T Nomura (Japan) Y Shimogami	19	13
(Australia) Tang HD (Australia) Xie ZW	12	11
6	(Japan) K Shibata (Japan) N Yamada	21	21
(Malaysia) Chok K W (Malaysia) Kok Y T	15	13
(Malaysia) Beh C M (Malaysia) Goh B Z	21	21
(Chinese Taipei) Chang K-h (Chinese Taipei) Chen Y-c	9	15
4	(China) Tan Q (China) Zhou HD	21	21

Second round
Q2	(Chinese Taipei) Cheng K-w (Chinese Taipei) Liao C-p	18	15
6	(Japan) K Shibata (Japan) N Yamada	21	21
(Malaysia) Beh C M (Malaysia) Goh B Z	12	10
4	(China) Tan Q (China) Zhou HD	21	21

Quarter-finals
6	(Japan) K Shibata (Japan) N Yamada	12	10
4	(China) Tan Q (China) Zhou HD	21	21

==== Section 4 ====
First round
(Chinese Taipei) Lin C-y (Chinese Taipei) Lin Y-s	21	18	18
(Japan) M Onodera (Japan) D Tanioka	15	21	21
(Malaysia) Chia W J (Malaysia) Liew X	13	17
5	(Chinese Taipei) Lin B-w (Chinese Taipei) Su C-h	21	21
Q3	(Chinese Taipei) Chen B-y (Chinese Taipei) Li F-c	9	14
(Chinese Taipei) Chiu H-c (Chinese Taipei) Liu K-h	21	21
(Malaysia) Boon X Y (Malaysia) Goh V S	13	17
2	(Malaysia) Lwi S H (Malaysia) J Wong	21	21

Second round
(Japan) M Onodera (Japan) D Tanioka	21	20	15
5	(Chinese Taipei) Lin B-w (Chinese Taipei) Su C-h	19	22	21
(Chinese Taipei) Chiu H-c (Chinese Taipei) Liu K-h	21	21
2	(Malaysia) Lwi S H (Malaysia) J Wong	14	15

Quarter-finals
5	(Chinese Taipei) Lin B-w (Chinese Taipei) Su C-h	9	22	21
(Chinese Taipei) Chiu H-c (Chinese Taipei) Liu K-h	21	20	17

== Women's doubles ==
=== Seeds ===
1. (Thailand) Laksika Kanlaha / Phataimas Muenwong (champions)
2. (Chinese Taipei) Hung En-tzu / Lin Yu-pei (quarter-finals)
3. (Chinese Taipei) Nicole Gonzales Chan / Yang Chu-yun (first round)
4. (Chinese Taipei) Cheng Yu-pei / Sun Yu-hsing (second round)
5. (China) Bao Lijing / Tang Ruizhi (semi-finals)
6. (Malaysia) Go Pei Kee / Low Yeen Yuan (second round)
7. (Chinese Taipei) Lin Xiao-min / Liu Chiao-yun (second round)
8. (China) Guo Yuxin / Xia Yuting (second round)

=== Finals ===
Semi-finals
1	(Thailand) Laksika Kanlaha (Thailand) Phataimas Muenwong	21	21
5	(China) Bao Lijing (China) Tang Ruizhi	17	12
(China) Chen Xiaofei (China) Feng Xueying	21	18	21
(Japan) Kokona Ishikawa (Japan) Mio Konegawa	18	21	16

Final
1	(Thailand) Laksika Kanlaha (Thailand) Phataimas Muenwong	17	21	21
(China) Chen Xiaofei (China) Feng Xueying	21	15	16

=== Top half ===
==== Section 1 ====
First round
1	(Thailand) L Kanlaha (Thailand) P Muenwong	18	21	21
(Chinese Taipei) Jiang Y-h (Chinese Taipei) Li Z-q	21	10	17
PFQ	(China) Chen YX (China) Zhang JE	21	21
(Chinese Taipei) Chiu P-c (Chinese Taipei) Tung C-t	18	9
7	(Chinese Taipei) Lin X-m (Chinese Taipei) Liu C-y	21	21
(Chinese Taipei) Chung K-y (Chinese Taipei) Hsieh P-s	15	12
PFQ	(China) Hua XB (China) Qian GH	21	18	11
(Japan) M Kawazoe (Japan) R Kiyose	17	21	21

Second round
1	(Thailand) L Kanlaha (Thailand) P Muenwong	21	21
PFQ	(China) Chen YX (China) Zhang JE	14	11
7	(Chinese Taipei) Lin X-m (Chinese Taipei) Liu C-y	21	17
(Japan) M Kawazoe (Japan) R Kiyose	23	21

Quarter-finals
1	(Thailand) L Kanlaha (Thailand) P Muenwong	21	21
(Japan) M Kawazoe (Japan) R Kiyose	19	17

==== Section 2 ====
First round
4	(Chinese Taipei) Cheng Y-p (Chinese Taipei) Sun Y-h	w	/	o
Q1
PFQ	(Malaysia) Lee Z Q (Malaysia) Tio S X	18	10
(China) Huang KX (China) Wu MY	21	21
5	(China) Bao LJ (China) Tang RZ	21	21
(Chinese Taipei) Sung Yi-h (Chinese Taipei) Yang Y-h	16	10
(Chinese Taipei) Lin Y-y (Chinese Taipei) Tsai R-l	8	11
PFQ	(China) Qiao SJ (China) Wang YY	21	21

Second round
4	(Chinese Taipei) Cheng Y-p (Chinese Taipei) Sun Y-h	10	21	18
(China) Huang KX (China) Wu MY	21	9	21
5	(China) Bao LJ (China) Tang RZ	21	21
PFQ	(China) Qiao SJ (China) Wang YY	14	15

Quarter-finals
(China) Huang KX (China) Wu MY	22	12	12
5	(China) Bao LJ (China) Tang RZ	20	21	21

=== Bottom half ===
==== Section 3 ====
First round
(Chinese Taipei) Wang Y-z (Chinese Taipei) Yang Y-c	16	21	8
(Chinese Taipei) Lin C-c (Chinese Taipei) Sung Yu-h	21	18	21
Q2	(Chinese Taipei) Hung Y-t (Chinese Taipei) Peng Y-w	13	17
8	(China) Guo YX (China) Xia YT	21	21
(Chinese Taipei) Hung H-e (Chinese Taipei) Hung Y-e	10	9
(Japan) M Otake (Japan) M Takahashi	21	21
(China) Chen XF (China) Feng XY	21	21
3	(Chinese Taipei) N G Chan (Chinese Taipei) Yang C-y	14	7

Second round
(Chinese Taipei) Lin C-c (Chinese Taipei) Sung Yu-h	21	21
8	(China) Guo YX (China) Xia YT	16	18
(Japan) M Otake (Japan) M Takahashi	16	24	17
(China) Chen XF (China) Feng XY	21	22	21

Quarter-finals
(Chinese Taipei) Lin C-c (Chinese Taipei) Sung Yu-h	18	16
(China) Chen XF (China) Feng XY	21	21

==== Section 4 ====
First round
(Japan) K Ishikawa (Japan) M Konegawa	21	21
(China) Ding KY (China) Luo Y	13	11
Q4	(China) Chen YY (China) Wu JS	15	16
6	(Malaysia) Go P K (Malaysia) Low Y Y	21	21
(China) Huang XY (China) Lu Y	17	13
(Japan) M Kanehiro (Japan) R Kiyama	21	21
Q3	(China) Liang YE (China) Zhou JQ	16	14
2	(Chinese Taipei) Hung E-t (Chinese Taipei) Lin Y-p	21	21

Second round
(Japan) K Ishikawa (Japan) M Konegawa	21	21
6	(Malaysia) Go P K (Malaysia) Low Y Y	8	19
(Japan) M Kanehiro (Japan) R Kiyama	16	18
2	(Chinese Taipei) Hung E-t (Chinese Taipei) Lin Y-p	21	21

Quarter-finals
(Japan) K Ishikawa (Japan) M Konegawa	21	21
2	(Chinese Taipei) Hung E-t (Chinese Taipei) Lin Y-p	17	14

== Mixed doubles ==
=== Seeds ===
1. (Chinese Taipei) Chiu Hsiang-chieh / Lin Xiao-min (quarter-finals)
2. (Chinese Taipei) Wu Hsuan-yi / Yang Chu-yun (second round)
3. (Chinese Taipei) Lin Bing-wei / Lin Chih-chun (first round)
4. (Thailand) Pakkapon Teeraratsakul / Phataimas Muenwong (quarter-finals)
5. (China) Zhang Hanyu / Wu Mengying (semi-finals)
6. (Indonesia) Bobby Setiabudi / Melati Daeva Oktavianti (first round)
7. (China) Zhou Zhihong / Yang Jiayi (champions)
8. (Chinese Taipei) Huang Jui-hsuan / Hsieh Pei-shan (second round)

=== Finals ===
Semi-finals
5	(China) Zhang Hanyu (China) Wu Mengying	20	14
7	(China) Zhou Zhihong (China) Yang Jiayi	22	21
(China) Guo Xinwa (China) Li Qian	21	21
Q4	(Japan) Yuichi Shimogami (Japan) Sayaka Hobara	19	15

Final
7	(China) Zhou Zhihong (China) Yang Jiayi	21	21
(China) Guo Xinwa (China) Li Qian	15	15

=== Top half ===
==== Section 1 ====
First round
1	(Chinese Taipei) Chiu H-c (Chinese Taipei) Lin X-m	23	21
Q2	(China) Gao JX (China) Huang KX	21	11
(Chinese Taipei) Cheng K-w (Chinese Taipei) Liu C-y	21	21
(Chinese Taipei) Tsai C-h (Chinese Taipei) Lee Y-h	13	11
5	(China) Zhang HY (China) Wu MY	21	21
(India) T Kona (India) S K P Kudaravalli	11	8
(China) Chen SH (China) Lin X	18	21	21
(Thailand) P Horbanluekit (Thailand) C Korepap	21	15	11

Second round
1	(Chinese Taipei) Chiu H-c (Chinese Taipei) Lin X-m	21	21
(Chinese Taipei) Cheng K-w (Chinese Taipei) Liu C-y	18	18
5	(China) Zhang HY (China) Wu MY	21	21
(China) Chen SH (China) Lin X	11	13

Quarter-finals
1	(Chinese Taipei) Chiu H-c (Chinese Taipei) Lin X-m	22	17	18
5	(China) Zhang HY (China) Wu MY	20	21	21

==== Section 2 ====
First round
4	(Thailand) P Teeraratsakul (Thailand) P Muenwong	21	21
(Chinese Taipei) Li F-c (Chinese Taipei) Hung E-t	12	12
(Chinese Taipei) Chen X-y (Chinese Taipei) Hung Y-e	21	21
(Australia) Teoh K C (Australia) Teoh K Q	9	13
7	(China) Zhou ZH (China) Yang JY	20	21	21
(China) Li HG (China) Zheng YW	22	17	15
(China) Zhu YJ (China) Luo Y	14	21	21
(Chinese Taipei) Ting Y-c (Chinese Taipei) Wang Y-z	21	16	23

Second round
4	(Thailand) P Teeraratsakul (Thailand) P Muenwong	21	21
(Chinese Taipei) Chen X-y (Chinese Taipei) Hung Y-e	7	10
7	(China) Zhou ZH (China) Yang JY	21	19	21
(Chinese Taipei) Ting Y-c (Chinese Taipei) Wang Y-z	14	21	10

Quarter-finals
4	(Thailand) P Teeraratsakul (Thailand) P Muenwong	22	17
7	(China) Zhou ZH (China) Yang JY	24	21

=== Bottom half ===
==== Section 3 ====
First round
(Chinese Taipei) Chang K-h (Chinese Taipei) Sung Y-h	19	21	20
PFQ	(Chinese Taipei) Chen Y-c (Chinese Taipei) Liao Y-c	21	15	22
(China) Guo XW (China) Li Q	21	21
6	(Indonesia) B Setiabudi (Indonesia) M D Oktavianti	15	17
Q1	(China) Huang YX (China) Qin HZ	21	21
(Chinese Taipei) Chen B-y (Chinese Taipei) Chung K-y	19	15
(China) Ma XX (China) Tang RZ	12	21	21
3	(Chinese Taipei) Lin B-w (Chinese Taipei) Lin C-c	21	15	16

Second round
PFQ	(Chinese Taipei) Chen Y-c (Chinese Taipei) Liao Y-c	6	10
(China) Guo XW (China) Li Q	21	21
Q1	(China) Huang YX (China) Qin HZ	21	16	10
(China) Ma XX (China) Tang RZ	15	21	21

Quarter-finals
(China) Guo XW (China) Li Q	21	21
(China) Ma XX (China) Tang RZ	14	16

==== Section 4 ====
First round
Q4	(Japan) Y Shimogami (Japan) S Hobara	21	21
(Chinese Taipei) Chiang C-w (Chinese Taipei) N G Chan	19	15
(Malaysia) Too M Y (Malaysia) Lim X	9	6
8	(Chinese Taipei) Huang J-h (Chinese Taipei) Hsieh P-s	21	21
Q3	(China) Shang YC (China) Lin FL	21	21
(Macau) Leong I C (Macau) Ng W C	15	17
(Chinese Taipei) Ma C-y (Chinese Taipei) Lin Y-y	15	11
2	(Chinese Taipei) Wu H-y (Chinese Taipei) Yang C-y	21	21

Second round
Q4	(Japan) Y Shimogami (Japan) S Hobara	21	21
8	(Chinese Taipei) Huang J-h (Chinese Taipei) Hsieh P-s	11	10
Q3	(China) Shang YC (China) Lin FL	14	21	21
2	(Chinese Taipei) Wu H-y (Chinese Taipei) Yang C-y	21	17	14

Quarter-finals
Q4	(Japan) Y Shimogami (Japan) S Hobara	21	18	21
Q3	(China) Shang YC (China) Lin FL	18	21	18

Preceded by 2024 All England Open; 2024 Orléans Masters	BWF World Tour; 2024 BWF season	Succeeded by 2024 Spain Masters
