= 2025 Ruichang China Masters =

Badminton tournament in China

Tournament details
- Dates: 11–16 March
- Edition: 3rd
- Level: Super 100
- Total prize money: US$120,000
- Venue: Ruichang Sports Park Gym
- Location: Ruichang, China

Champions
- Men's singles: (China) Sun Chao
- Women's singles: (China) Zhang Yiman
- Men's doubles: (China) Chen Yongrui (China) Chen Zhehan
- Women's doubles: (China) Chen Xiaofei (China) Feng Xueying
- Mixed doubles: (Hong Kong) Tang Chun Man (Hong Kong) Ng Tsz Yau

The 2025 Ruichang China Masters (officially known as the Ruichang China Masters 2025) was a badminton tournament that took place at the Ruichang Sports Park Gym, Ruichang, China, from 11 to 16 March 2025 and had a total prize of US$120,000.

== Tournament ==
The 2025 Ruichang China Masters was the eighth tournament of the 2025 BWF World Tour and was part of the Ruichang China Masters championships, which had been held since 2023. This tournament is organized by the Chinese Badminton Association with sanction from the BWF.

=== Venue ===
This tournament has been held at the Ruichang Sports Park Gym in Ruichang, China.

=== Point distribution ===
Below is the point distribution table for each phase of the tournament based on the BWF points system for the BWF Tour Super 100 event.

Winner	Runner-up	3/4	5/8	9/16	17/32	33/64	65/128
5,500	4,680	3,850	3,030	2,110	1,290	510	240

=== Prize pool ===
The total prize money is US$120,000 with the distribution of the prize money in accordance with BWF regulations.

Event	Winner	Finalist	Semi-finals	Quarter-finals	Last 16
Singles	$9,000	$4,560	$1,740	$720	$420
Doubles	$9,480	$4,560	$1,680	$870	$450

== Men's singles ==
=== Seeds ===
1. (Malaysia) Cheam June Wei (second round)
2. (Malaysia) Aidil Sholeh (semi-finals)
3. (Indonesia) Yohanes Saut Marcellyno (second round)
4. (Vietnam) Lê Đức Phát (second round)
5. (Vietnam) Nguyễn Hải Đăng (second round)
6. (Chinese Taipei) Huang Ping-hsien (second round)
7. (Chinese Taipei) Huang Yu-kai (third round)
8. (Chinese Taipei) Kuo Kuan-lin (quarter-finals)

=== Finals ===
Semi-finals
(China) Hu Zhe'an	21	18	16
Q8	(China) Zhou Xinyu	8	21	21
Q1	(China) Sun Chao	13	21	21
2	(Malaysia) Aidil Sholeh	21	19	18

Final
Q8	(China) Zhou Xinyu	15	17
Q1	(China) Sun Chao	21	21

=== Top half ===
==== Section 1 ====
First round
(Chinese Taipei) Chen C-t	3	7
(China) Dong TY	21	21
(Malaysia) S Lee	7	10
(Japan) Y Okimoto	21	21
(China) Liu L	21	21
(Malaysia) Huan K H	9	13
(Chinese Taipei) Huang Y	15	19
(China) Hu ZA	21	21

Second round
1	(Malaysia) Cheam J W	11	12
(China) Dong TY	21	21
Q2	(Chinese Taipei) Yih C-h	21	13	13
(Japan) Y Okimoto	19	21	21
5	(Vietnam) Nguyễn H Đ	13	17
(China) Liu L	21	21
(Malaysia) E Ewe	12	11
(China) Hu ZA	21	21

Third round
(China) Dong TY	21	21
(Japan) Y Okimoto	18	16
(China) Liu L	14	21	9
(China) Hu ZA	21	18	21

Quarter-finals
(China) Dong TY	19	13
(China) Hu ZA	21	21

==== Section 2 ====
First round
Q8	(China) Zhou XY	21	21
(Chinese Taipei) Ting Y-c	15	16
(Chinese Taipei) Ma C-y	17	21	13
Q3	(China) Zeng YF	21	19	21
(China) Liu YX	18	21	21
PFQ	(Chinese Taipei) Su W-c	21	10	19
Q6	(Hong Kong) Awan U	21	21
Q5	(Malaysia) Ooi Y P	13	13

Second round
3	(Indonesia) Y S Marcellyno	10	16
Q8	(China) Zhou XY	21	21
(Malaysia) Kok J H	21	21	22
Q3	(China) Zeng YF	11	23	20
8	(Chinese Taipei) Kuo K-l	21	21
(China) Liu YX	12	10
(Canada) XD Sheng	21	21
Q6	(Hong Kong) Awan U	16	14

Third round
Q8	(China) Zhou XY	21	22	21
(Malaysia) Kok J H	18	24	19
8	(Chinese Taipei) Kuo K-l	21	21
(Canada) XD Sheng	10	13

Quarter-finals
Q8	(China) Zhou XY	21	21
8	(Chinese Taipei) Kuo K-l	16	13

=== Bottom half ===
==== Section 3 ====
First round
(Hong Kong) Chan Y C	21	21
(India) K K Mekala	9	8
(Chinese Taipei) Tsai C-h	21	21
(Canada) S Yuan	11	8
(China) Zhao JP	21	21
Q7	(Chinese Taipei) Wu Z-y	13	16
(Chinese Taipei) Cheng K	13	21	21
(Sri Lanka) D Abeywickrama	21	10	14

Second round
(Hong Kong) Chan Y C	15	11
Q1	(China) Sun C	21	21
(Chinese Taipei) Tsai C-h	17	21	12
7	(Chinese Taipei) Huang Y-k	21	10	21
(China) Zhao JP	16	16
(Indonesia) Z Ubaidillah	21	21
(Chinese Taipei) Cheng K	21	22	21
4	(Vietnam) Lê Đ P	9	24	10

Third round
Q1	(China) Sun C	21	16	21
7	(Chinese Taipei) Huang Y-k	10	21	16
(Indonesia) Z Ubaidillah	19	14
(Chinese Taipei) Cheng K	21	21

Quarter-finals
Q1	(China) Sun C	21	21
(Chinese Taipei) Cheng K	18	12

==== Section 4 ====
First round
PFQ	(China) Wang ZJ	21	21
(China) Zhu XC	12	12
(Macau) Pui P F	21	12	21
(United Arab Emirates) B Latheesh	18	21	8
(Australia) K C Teoh	12	10
(Chinese Taipei) Wang Y-k	21	21
(Malaysia) Ong Z Y	15	7
Q4	(China) Zhang N	21	21

Second round
PFQ	(China) Wang ZJ	21	21
(Thailand) K Laotrakul	6	13
(Macau) Pui P F	21	21
6	(Chinese Taipei) Huang P-h	19	17
(Chinese Taipei) Wang Y-k	16	21	9
(Chinese Taipei) Lu C-h	21	16	21
Q4	(China) Zhang N	21	16	16
2	(Malaysia) Aidil S	9	21	21

Third round
PFQ	(China) Wang ZJ	23	21
(Macau) Pui P F	21	15
(Chinese Taipei) Lu C-h	10	18
2	(Malaysia) Aidil S	21	21

Quarter-finals
PFQ	(China) Wang ZJ	19	17
2	(Malaysia) Aidil S	21	21

== Women's singles ==
=== Seeds ===
1. (China) Zhang Yiman (champion)
2. (Indonesia) Ester Nurumi Tri Wardoyo (semi-finals)
3. (Japan) Manami Suizu (first round)
4. (Chinese Taipei) Liang Ting-yu (first round)
5. (Myanmar) Thet Htar Thuzar (second round)
6. (China) Dai Wang (quarter-finals)
7. (China) Wu Luoyu (quarter-finals)
8. (Chinese Taipei) Huang Ching-ping (quarter-finals)

=== Finals ===
Semi-finals
1	(China) Zhang Yiman	21	21
Q1	(China) Luo Shengxian	19	10
(China) Han Qianxi	21	19	21
2	(Indonesia) Ester Nurumi Tri Wardoyo	19	21	12

Final
1	(China) Zhang Yiman	21	21
(China) Han Qianxi	13	14

=== Top half ===
==== Section 1 ====
First round
1	(China) Zhang YM	21	21
(Indonesia) Ruzana	14	19
(Chinese Taipei) Peng Y-w	21	21
(Chinese Taipei) Lin S-y	19	7
6	(China) Dai W	21	21
(Japan) S Yoshikawa	1	16
(Hong Kong) S S Mehta	21	13	21
(Malaysia) Loh Z W	15	21	13

Second round
1	(China) Zhang YM	21	19	21
(Chinese Taipei) Peng Y-w	14	21	14
6	(China) Dai W	21	21
(Hong Kong) S S Mehta	10	14

Quarter-finals
1	(China) Zhang YM	21	20	23
6	(China) Dai W	18	22	21

==== Section 2 ====
First round
3	(Japan) M Suizu	16	12
Q1	(China) Luo SX	21	21
Q2	(Chinese Taipei) Wang P-y	21	21
(Australia) K Q Teoh	11	12
5	(Myanmar) Thet Htar T	21	21
(United States) I Rusli	18	10
(Chinese Taipei) Hung Y-t	18	21	21
Q3	(Hong Kong) Liang K W	21	4	13

Second round
Q1	(China) Luo SX	21	21
Q2	(Chinese Taipei) Wang P-y	16	18
5	(Myanmar) Thet Htar T	14	12
(Chinese Taipei) Hung Y-t	21	21

Quarter-finals
Q1	(China) Luo SX	22	21
(Chinese Taipei) Hung Y-t	20	15

=== Bottom half ===
==== Section 3 ====
First round
(China) Cai YY	21	21
(Malaysia) Wong L C	17	7
(Malaysia) S Zulaikha	18	15
8	(Chinese Taipei) Huang C-p	21	21
(India) S Valishetty	21	16	12
(Indonesia) N K D A Pratiwi	9	21	21
(China) Han QX	21	21
4	(Chinese Taipei) Liang T-y	13	15

Second round
(China) Cai YY	18	17
8	(Chinese Taipei) Huang C-p	21	21
(Indonesia) N K D A Pratiwi	21	12	18
(China) Han QX	16	21	21

Quarter-finals
8	(Chinese Taipei) Huang C-p	12	21	13
(China) Han QX	21	18	21

==== Section 4 ====
First round
(Thailand) P Opatniputh	21	21
(Singapore) J Hooi	15	16
(United States) D Gupta	8	9
7	(China) Wu LY	21	21
(Hong Kong) Yeung S Y	19	12
(Indonesia) M A Puspitasari	21	21
Q4	(China) Yang JR	17	28	18
2	(Indonesia) E N T Wardoyo	21	26	21

Second round
(Thailand) P Opatniputh	15	21	13
7	(China) Wu LY	21	9	21
(Indonesia) M A Puspitasari	17	21
2	(Indonesia) E N T Wardoyo	21	23

Quarter-finals
7	(China) Wu LY	18	19
2	(Indonesia) E N T Wardoyo	21	21

== Men's doubles ==
=== Seeds ===
1. (Indonesia) Rahmat Hidayat / Yeremia Rambitan (second round)
2. (China) Cui Hechen / Peng Jianqin (second round)
3. (Thailand) Chaloempon Charoenkitamorn / Worrapol Thongsa-nga (first round)
4. (Japan) Kazuki Shibata / Naoki Yamada (semi-finals)
5. (Japan) Kakeru Kumagai / Hiroki Nishi (second round)
6. (China) Chen Xujun / Guo Ruohan (second round)
7. (China) Tan Qiang / Yu Jiahao (second round)
8. (Singapore) Wesley Koh / Junsuke Kubo (second round)

=== Finals ===
Semi-finals
Q3	(China) Chen Yongrui (China) Chen Zhehan	17	21	21
4	(Japan) Kazuki Shibata (Japan) Naoki Yamada	21	16	15
Q1	(China) Hu Keyuan (China) Lin Xiangyi	21	21
(Chinese Taipei) Cheng Kai-wen (Chinese Taipei) Liao Chao-pang	18	12

Final
Q3	(China) Chen Yongrui (China) Chen Zhehan	23	21
Q1	(China) Hu Keyuan (China) Lin Xiangyi	21	15

=== Top half ===
==== Section 1 ====
First round
1	(Indonesia) R Hidayat (Indonesia) Y Rambitan	21	7	21
PFQ	(China) Deng HX (China) Xu JJ	13	21	14
Q3	(China) Chen YR (China) Chen ZH	21	21
(Hong Kong) Hung K C (Hong Kong) Lui C W	18	14
7	(China) Tan Q (China) Yu JH	21	21
(Macau) Pui C C (Macau) Pui P F	17	18
(Malaysia) Boon X Y (Malaysia) Lee Y B	17	21	16
(South Korea) Choi S-g (Malaysia) Goh V S	21	18	21

Second round
1	(Indonesia) R Hidayat (Indonesia) Y Rambitan	21	14	13
Q3	(China) Chen YR (China) Chen ZH	16	21	21
7	(China) Tan Q (China) Yu JH	18	15
(South Korea) Choi S-g (Malaysia) Goh V S	21	21

Quarter-finals
Q3	(China) Chen YR (China) Chen ZH	21	21
(South Korea) Choi S-g (Malaysia) Goh V S	15	17

==== Section 2 ====
First round
4	(Japan) K Shibata (Japan) N Yamada	21	21
(Chinese Taipei) Lee C-l (Chinese Taipei) Yang M-t	17	13
(Chinese Taipei) Chan Y-l (Chinese Taipei) Chu B-r	21	15	21
(Chinese Taipei) Chen C (Chinese Taipei) Lin S-k	17	21	13
6	(China) Chen XJ (China) Guo RH	21	21
(Malaysia) Beh C M (Malaysia) Choi J S	19	11
(Malaysia) Lau Y S (Malaysia) Lim T J	21	21
(Chinese Taipei) Chou Y-h (Chinese Taipei) Yang P-c	12	16

Second round
4	(Japan) K Shibata (Japan) N Yamada	24	21
(Chinese Taipei) Chan Y-l (Chinese Taipei) Chu B-r	22	18
6	(China) Chen XJ (China) Guo RH	16	21	17
(Malaysia) Lau Y S (Malaysia) Lim T J	21	15	21

Quarter-finals
4	(Japan) K Shibata (Japan) N Yamada	21	21
(Malaysia) Lau Y S (Malaysia) Lim T J	17	12

=== Bottom half ===
==== Section 3 ====
First round
Q1	(China) Hu KY (China) Lin XY	21	21
Q2	(China) Liao PY (China) Ma XX	15	18
(Chinese Taipei) Chen B-y (Chinese Taipei) Tseng M-h	21	19	19
8	(Singapore) W Koh (Singapore) J Kubo	18	21	21
(Chinese Taipei) Lai P-y (Chinese Taipei) Tsai F-c	10	21	21
(Chinese Taipei) Lin C-y (Chinese Taipei) Lin Y-s	21	17	11
(Chinese Taipei) Bao Xin D G L W (Chinese Taipei) Chiu T-h	18	22	21
3	(Thailand) C Charoenkitamorn (Thailand) W Thongsa-nga	21	20	18

Second round
Q1	(China) Hu KY (China) Lin XY	21	21
8	(Singapore) W Koh (Singapore) J Kubo	15	18
(Chinese Taipei) Lai P-y (Chinese Taipei) Tsai F-c	21	21
(Chinese Taipei) Bao Xin D G L W (Chinese Taipei) Chiu T-h	11	16

Quarter-finals
Q1	(China) Hu KY (China) Lin XY	18	21	21
(Chinese Taipei) Lai P-y (Chinese Taipei) Tsai F-c	21	15	18

==== Section 4 ====
First round
(Chinese Taipei) Lu C-y (Chinese Taipei) Wei C-w	21	21
(Chinese Taipei) Huang T-i (Chinese Taipei) Lin T-y	11	17
(China) Lin YF (China) Ma S	21	10	7
5	(Japan) K Kumagai (Japan) H Nishi	16	21	21
(Chinese Taipei) Cheng K-w (Chinese Taipei) Liao C-p	21	21
(Malaysia) D Khoo (Malaysia) Lye J C	10	9
Q4	(Hong Kong) Tang C M (Hong Kong) Yeung S C	16	22	12
2	(China) Cui HC (China) Peng JQ	21	20	21

Second round
(Chinese Taipei) Lu C-y (Chinese Taipei) Wei C-w	21	21
5	(Japan) K Kumagai (Japan) H Nishi	19	9
(Chinese Taipei) Cheng K-w (Chinese Taipei) Liao C-p	21	22
2	(China) Cui HC (China) Peng JQ	18	20

Quarter-finals
(Chinese Taipei) Lu C-y (Chinese Taipei) Wei C-w	23	13	20
(Chinese Taipei) Cheng K-w (Chinese Taipei) Liao C-p	21	21	22

== Women's doubles ==
=== Seeds ===
1. (Hong Kong) Lui Lok Lok / Tsang Hiu Yan (withdrew)
2. (Hong Kong) Fan Ka Yan / Yau Mau Ying (first round)
3. (Chinese Taipei) Hsu Ya-ching / Sung Yu-hsuan (first round)
4. (Japan) Kaho Osawa / Mai Tanabe (first round)
5. (China) Qiao Shijun / Zheng Yu (final)
6. (China) Li Qian / Tang Ruizhi (quarter-finals)
7. (China) Liu Jiayue / Liu Xuanxuan (second round)
8. (Japan) Kokona Ishikawa / Ririna Hiramoto (second round)

=== Finals ===
Semi-finals
(China) Chen Xiaofei (China) Feng Xueying	21	21
(China) Lin Fangling (China) Zhou Xinru	13	16
5	(China) Qiao Shijun (China) Zheng Yu	22	21
Q3	(Japan) Hinata Suzuki (Japan) An Uesugi	20	7

Final
(China) Chen Xiaofei (China) Feng Xueying	21	21
5	(China) Qiao Shijun (China) Zheng Yu	17	12

=== Top half ===
==== Section 1 ====
First round
3	(Chinese Taipei) Hsu Y-c (Chinese Taipei) Sung Y-h	14	21	10
(China) Huang KX (China) Liao LX	21	13	21
Q1	(China) Pang JE (China) Qian ZY	w	/	o
(Thailand) P Aiamvareesrisakul (Thailand) S Janpeng
7	(China) Liu JY (China) Liu XX	21	21
(China) Keng SL (China) Li HZ	13	11
(China) Chen XF (China) Feng XY	21	21
(China) Luo Y (China) Wang ZM	8	9

Second round
(China) Huang KX (China) Liao LX	21	21
Q1	(China) Pang JE (China) Qian ZY	4	16
7	(China) Liu JY (China) Liu XX	21	15	19
(China) Chen XF (China) Feng XY	19	21	21

Quarter-finals
(China) Huang KX (China) Liao LX	12	10
(China) Chen XF (China) Feng XY	21	21

==== Section 2 ====
First round
8	(Japan) R Hiramoto (Japan) K Ishikawa	21	21
Q4	(China) Chen YY (China) Yan CX	19	15
(Japan) M Konegawa (Japan) M Yamakita	12	14
(China) Lin FL (China) Zhou XR	21	21
SWM	(Japan) M Taguchi (Japan) N Yamakita	21	17	21
(Chinese Taipei) Chung C-e (Chinese Taipei) Huang T-l	11	21	15
(China) Li WM (China) Wang YD	21	21
PFQ	(China) Hua XB (China) Qian GH	15	15

Second round
8	(Japan) R Hiramoto (Japan) K Ishikawa	14	11
(China) Lin FL (China) Zhou XR	21	21
SWM	(Japan) M Taguchi (Japan) N Yamakita	22	21
(China) Li WM (China) Wang YD	20	13

Quarter-finals
(China) Lin FL (China) Zhou XR	13	21	21
SWM	(Japan) M Taguchi (Japan) N Yamakita	21	17	14

=== Bottom half ===
==== Section 3 ====
First round
(China) Ding KY (China) Shen SY	14	14
Q2	(China) Qian TY (China) Wang YY	21	21
(Sri Lanka) H Ambalangodage (Sri Lanka) H Wijayarathne	10	7
5	(China) Qiao SJ (China) Zheng Y	21	21
(Chinese Taipei) Hsieh M-y (Chinese Taipei) Li Z-q	22	21
(Chinese Taipei) Liang T-y (Chinese Taipei) Wang S-m	20	19
(Japan) N Hara (Japan) R Kiyose	21	21
4	(Japan) K Osawa (Japan) M Tanabe	16	19

Second round
Q2	(China) Qian TY (China) Wang YY	9	9
5	(China) Qiao SJ (China) Zheng Y	21	21
(Chinese Taipei) Hsieh M-y (Chinese Taipei) Li Z-q	18	21	19
(Japan) N Hara (Japan) R Kiyose	21	14	21

Quarter-finals
5	(China) Qiao SJ (China) Zheng Y	21	18	21
(Japan) N Hara (Japan) R Kiyose	15	21	15

==== Section 4 ====
First round
PFQ	(Chinese Taipei) Hsieh C-y (Chinese Taipei) Ko R-h	21	14	21
(United Arab Emirates) M O Khan (United Arab Emirates) T Khan	14	21	16
(Hong Kong) Cheung Y Y (Hong Kong) Leung S L	14	17
6	(China) Li Q (China) Tang RZ	21	21
(Japan) H Osawa (Japan) A Sato	21	21	26
Q3	(Japan) H Suzuki (Japan) A Uesugi	13	23	28
(Chinese Taipei) Chen Y-h (Chinese Taipei) Liu C-y	20	22	21
2	(Hong Kong) Fan K Y (Hong Kong) Yau M Y	22	20	9

Second round
PFQ	(Chinese Taipei) Hsieh C-y (Chinese Taipei) Ko R-h	10	8
6	(China) Li Q (China) Tang RZ	21	21
Q3	(Japan) H Suzuki (Japan) A Uesugi	w	/	o
(Chinese Taipei) Chen Y-h (Chinese Taipei) Liu C-y

Quarter-finals
6	(China) Li Q (China) Tang RZ	18	21	13
Q3	(Japan) H Suzuki (Japan) A Uesugi	21	18	21

== Mixed doubles ==
=== Seeds ===
1. (Japan) Hiroki Nishi / Akari Sato (quarter-finals)
2. (Hong Kong) Lui Chun Wai / Fu Chi Yan (second round)
3. (Japan) Yuta Watanabe / Maya Taguchi (second round)
4. (Macau) Leong Iok Chong / Ng Weng Chi (second round)
5. (China) Ma Xixiang / Li Qian (semi-finals)
6. (China) Gao Jiaxuan / Wu Mengying (second round)
7. (Hong Kong) Tang Chun Man / Ng Tsz Yau (champions)
8. (China) Zhang Hanyu / Tang Ruizhi (final)

=== Finals ===
Semi-finals
(China) Liao Pinyi (China) Huang Kexin	13	21	10
7	(Hong Kong) Tang Chun Man (Hong Kong) Ng Tsz Yau	21	16	21
8	(China) Zhang Hanyu (China) Tang Ruizhi	18	23	21
5	(China) Ma Xixiang (China) Li Qian	21	21	16

Final
7	(Hong Kong) Tang Chun Man (Hong Kong) Ng Tsz Yau	21	18	21
8	(China) Zhang Hanyu (China) Tang Ruizhi	17	21	12

=== Top half ===
==== Section 1 ====
First round
1	(Japan) H Nishi (Japan) A Sato	21	21
Q4	(Chinese Taipei) Tsai C-h (Chinese Taipei) Yu C-e	15	8
PFQ	(Malaysia) Too M Y (Malaysia) Lee Y S	17	11
PFQ	(China) Feng YL (China) Li YY	21	21
6	(China) Gao JX (China) Wu MY	21	21
(Chinese Taipei) Chen C (Chinese Taipei) Wang S-m	10	14
Q1	(Venezuela) J Wu Zheng (Venezuela) J Z Gabriela	11	9
(China) Liao PY (China) Huang KX	21	21

Second round
1	(Japan) H Nishi (Japan) A Sato	21	21
PFQ	(China) Feng YL (China) Li YY	19	16
6	(China) Gao JX (China) Wu MY	21	16	16
(China) Liao PY (China) Huang KX	19	21	21

Quarter-finals
1	(Japan) H Nishi (Japan) A Sato	21	19	13
(China) Liao PY (China) Huang KX	18	21	21

==== Section 2 ====
First round
3	(Japan) Y Watanabe (Japan) M Taguchi	21	21
(Australia) K C Teoh (Australia) K Q Teoh	10	4
(Chinese Taipei) Huang T-i (Chinese Taipei) Liao J-c	8	11
(China) Li HY (China) Bao LJ	21	21
7	(Hong Kong) Tang C M (Hong Kong) Ng T Y	21	21
(Malaysia) Lye J C (Malaysia) Lai T C	15	15
(Malaysia) Wee Y H (Malaysia) Chan W T	21	14	16
(China) Shang YC (China) Lin FL	13	21	21

Second round
3	(Japan) Y Watanabe (Japan) M Taguchi	18	15
(China) Li HY (China) Bao LJ	21	21
7	(Hong Kong) Tang C M (Hong Kong) Ng T Y	21	21
(China) Shang YC (China) Lin FL	14	12

Quarter-finals
(China) Li HY (China) Bao LJ	24	16
7	(Hong Kong) Tang C M (Hong Kong) Ng T Y	26	21

=== Bottom half ===
==== Section 3 ====
First round
(Chinese Taipei) Cheng K-w (Chinese Taipei) Liu C-y	21	21
(Malaysia) Ooi Y P (Singapore) Koh Y X	9	10
(Hong Kong) Hung K C (Hong Kong) Tsang H Y	16	13
8	(China) Zhang HY (China) Tang RZ	21	21
Q3	(China) Xia HL (China) Liao LX	21	17	18
(China) Chen ZG (China) Yu YS	17	21	21
(Chinese Taipei) Tsai F-c (Chinese Taipei) Sung Y-h	21	19	15
4	(Macau) Leong I C (Macau) Ng W C	9	21	21

Second round
(Chinese Taipei) Cheng K-w (Chinese Taipei) Liu C-y	18	13
8	(China) Zhang HY (China) Tang RZ	21	21
(China) Chen ZG (China) Yu YS	24	30
4	(Macau) Leong I C (Macau) Ng W C	22	29

Quarter-finals
8	(China) Zhang HY (China) Tang RZ	21	21
(China) Chen ZG (China) Yu YS	10	12

==== Section 4 ====
First round
(China) Lin XY (China) Liu JY	21	21
(New Zealand) HX Xia (Singapore) T Lim	9	5
(Malaysia) Low H C (Malaysia) V Gobi	18	10
5	(China) Ma XX (China) Li Q	21	21
Q2	(China) Xu JJ (China) Feng XY	17	18
(China) Shen XY (China) Yang JY	21	21
(Macau) Pui P F (Macau) Pui C W	6	16
2	(Hong Kong) Lui C W (Hong Kong) Fu C Y	21	21

Second round
(China) Lin XY (China) Liu JY	18	19
5	(China) Ma XX (China) Li Q	21	21
(China) Shen XY (China) Yang JY	21	21
2	(Hong Kong) Lui C W (Hong Kong) Fu C Y	17	17

Quarter-finals
5	(China) Ma XX (China) Li Q	21	15	21
(China) Shen XY (China) Yang JY	18	21	11

Preceded by 2025 Orléans Masters	BWF World Tour; 2025 BWF season	Succeeded by 2025 Swiss Open
