= Ruichang China Masters =

Annual badminton tournament in China

- Official website
- Founded: 2018; 8 years ago
- Editions: 6 (2026)
- Location: Ruichang; China
- Venue: Ruichang Sports Park Gym
- Prize money: US$120,000 (2026)

Men's
- Draw: 48S / 32D
- Current champions: Sun Chao (singles); He Jiting; Ren Xiangyu (doubles)
- Most singles titles: 2, Sun Chao
- Most doubles titles: 2, Zhou Haodong

Women's
- Draw: 32S / 32D
- Current champions: Xu Wenjing (singles); Liao Lixi; Shen Shiyao (doubles)
- Most singles titles: 1, all winners
- Most doubles titles: 2 Chen Xiaofei; Feng Xueying

Mixed doubles
- Draw: 32
- Current champions: Li Hongyi; Huang Kexin
- Most titles (male): 2, Tang Chun Man
- Most titles (female): 2, Ng Tsz Yau

Super 100
- Al Ain Masters; Akita Masters (2018–2019); Baoji China Masters; Dutch Open (2018–2019); Hyderabad Open (2018–2019); Indonesia Masters Super 100; Kaohsiung Masters; Malaysia Super 100; Guwahati Masters; Odisha Masters; Ruichang China Masters; Russian Open (2018–2019); Scottish Open (2018); Vietnam Open

Last completed
- 2026 Ruichang China Masters

The Ruichang China Masters (Chinese: 中国瑞昌羽毛球大师赛) is a Super 100 badminton tournament under the new BWF Tour format held in China. Previously it was known as Lingshui China Masters in 2018–2019. In 2023, the Super 100 tournament moved from Lingshui, Hainan to Ruichang, Jiangxi.

== Locations ==
Two cities have been chosen to host the tournament.

- 2018–2019: Lingshui
- 2023–2026: Ruichang
Locations of China Open host cities

== Previous winners ==
Year	Men's singles	Women's singles	Men's doubles	Women's doubles	Mixed doubles
2018	(Chinese Taipei) Lin Yu-hsien	(China) Li Xuerui	(China) Han Chengkai (China) Zhou Haodong	(China) Du Yue (China) Li Yinhui	(China) Guo Xinwa (China) Liu Xuanxuan
2019	(China) Weng Hongyang	(South Korea) Kim Ga-eun	(Chinese Taipei) Lee Jhe-huei (Chinese Taipei) Yang Po-hsuan	(South Korea) Baek Ha-na (South Korea) Kim Hye-rin	(Hong Kong) Tang Chun Man (Hong Kong) Ng Tsz Yau
2020	Cancelled (Note: This tournament, originally to be played from 25 February until 1 March before being moved to 5–10 May, was later cancelled due to the COVID-19 pandemic in mainland China.)				
2021	Cancelled (Note: This tournament, originally to be played from 23–28 March, was later cancelled due to the COVID-19 pandemic in mainland China.)				
2022	No competition				
2023	(China) Sun Feixiang	(Chinese Taipei) Lin Hsiang-ti	(China) Chen Boyang (China) Liu Yi	(China) Chen Xiaofei (China) Feng Xueying	(China) Jiang Zhenbang (China) Wei Yaxin
2024	(China) Wang Zhengxing	(Japan) Kaoru Sugiyama	(China) Tan Qiang (China) Zhou Haodong	(Thailand) Laksika Kanlaha (Thailand) Phataimas Muenwong	(China) Zhou Zhihong (China) Yang Jiayi
2025	(China) Sun Chao	(China) Zhang Yiman	(China) Chen Yongrui (China) Chen Zhehan	(China) Chen Xiaofei (China) Feng Xueying	(Hong Kong) Tang Chun Man (Hong Kong) Ng Tsz Yau
2026	(China) Sun Chao	(China) Xu Wenjing	(China) He Jiting (China) Ren Xiangyu	(China) Liao Lixi (China) Shen Shiyao	(China) Li Hongyi (China) Huang Kexin

== Performances by nation ==
As of 2026 edition

Pos	Nation	MS	WS	MD	WD	XD	Total
1	China	5	3	5	4	4	21
2	Chinese Taipei	1	1	1			3
3	Hong Kong					2	2
3	South Korea		1		1		2
5	Japan		1				1
5	Thailand				1		1
Total		6	6	6	6	6	30
