= Sun Chao (badminton) =

Chinese badminton player (born 2003)

Sun Chao 孙超
Personal information
- Born: 19 August 2003 (age 23) Hangzhou, Zhejiang, China

Sport
- Country: China
- Sport: Badminton
- Handedness: Right

Men's singles
- Highest ranking: 68 (10 November 2026)
- Current ranking: 68 (10 November 2026)
- BWF profile

Sun Chao (Chinese: 孙超; pinyin: Sūn Chāo; born 19 August 2003) is a Chinese badminton player.

== Achievements ==
=== BWF World Tour (4 titles, 2 runner-up) ===
The BWF World Tour, announced on 19 March 2017 and implemented in 2018, is a series of elite badminton tournaments, sanctioned by Badminton World Federation (BWF). The BWF World Tour is divided into six levels, namely World Tour Finals, Super 1000, Super 750, Super 500, Super 300, and the BWF Tour Super 100.

Men's singles
Year	Tournament	Level	Opponent	Score	Result
2023	Ruichang China Masters	Super 100	(China) Sun Feixiang	15–21, 14–21	(silver) Runner-up
2025	Ruichang China Masters	Super 100	(China) Zhou Xinyu	21–15, 21–17	(gold) Winner
2025	Baoji China Masters	Super 100	(China) Hu Zhe'an	23–21, 22–20	(gold) Winner
2026	Ruichang China Masters	Super 100	(Indonesia) Prahdiska Bagas Shujiwo	21–14, 21–11	(gold) Winner
2026	Baoji China Masters	Super 100	(Japan) Riki Takei	21–12, 21–13	(gold) Winner
2026 (I)	Indonesia Masters	Super 100	(Chinese Taipei) Wang Po-Wei	13–21, 19–21	(silver) Runner-up

=== BWF International Challenge/Series (1 title) ===
Men's singles
Year	Tournament	Opponent	Score	Result
2026	China International	(China) Wu Zisheng	21–10, 21–15	(gold) Winner
