= Li Kexin =

Chinese diplomat

Li Kexin (born January 1969, Chinese: 李克新), is a diplomat of the People's Republic of China who held the position of deputy director of the Central Foreign Affairs Commission (Chinese: 中央外事工作委员会办公室).

== Biography ==
Li Kexin, a graduate of Beijing Second Institute of Foreign Languages, commenced his tenure at the Ministry of Foreign Affairs of the People's Republic of China (MFA) in 1991, where he was assigned to the International Department. He also completed a year at the London School of Economics and Political Science (LSE) in the United Kingdom. In 2004, he was designated Deputy Mayor of Duyun City, Guizhou Province, and in 2006, he became Counsellor of the Permanent Mission to the United Nations (Chinese: 中国常驻联合国代表团). In 2012, he was appointed Deputy Director General of the Department of International Economics at the Ministry of Foreign Affairs; in 2015, he became minister at the United States Embassy; in early 2018, he succeeded Wu Xi (Chinese: 吴玺) as deputy head of the embassy; in 2021, he ascended to director general of the Department of International Economics at the Ministry of Foreign Affairs; and in September 2024, he resigned from the position of director general. In November 2024, he became the deputy director of the Central Foreign Affairs Commission.
