= Qiao Shijun =

Chinese badminton player (born 1999)

Qiao Shijun 乔诗峻
Personal information
- Born: 1 January 1999 (age 27)

Sport
- Country: China
- Sport: Badminton

Women's & mixed doubles
- Highest ranking: 163 (WD with Zhang Shuxian, September 2017); 257 (XD with Tan Qiang, May 2018)
- BWF profile

Qiao Shijun (Chinese: 乔诗峻; pinyin: Qiáo Shījùn; born 1 January 1999) is a Chinese badminton player.

== Achievements ==
=== BWF World Tour (2 runners-up) ===
The BWF World Tour, which was announced on 19 March 2017 and implemented in 2018, is a series of elite badminton tournaments sanctioned by the Badminton World Federation (BWF). The BWF World Tour is divided into levels of World Tour Finals, Super 1000, Super 750, Super 500, Super 300, and the BWF Tour Super 100.

Women's doubles
Year	Tournament	Level	Partner	Opponent	Score	Result
2025	Ruichang China Masters	Super 100	(China) Zheng Yu	(China) Chen Xiaofei (China) Feng Xueying	17–21, 12–21	(silver) Runner-up
2025	Baoji China Masters	Super 100	(China) Zheng Yu	(China) Luo Yi (China) Wang Tingge	21–17, 21–23, 15–21	(silver) Runner-up

=== BWF International Challenge/Series (1 title) ===
Women's doubles
Year	Tournament	Partner	Opponent	Score	Result
2022	Croatian International	(China) Zhou Xinru	(Chinese Taipei) Hsieh Pei-shan (Chinese Taipei) Tseng Yu-chi	21–15, 21–7	(gold) Winner

BWF International Challenge tournament
BWF International Series tournament
BWF Future Series tournament
