= Feng Xueying =

Chinese badminton player

Feng Xueying 冯雪颖
Personal information
- Born: 19 December 1998 (age 27) Guangdong, China
- Height: 1.69 m (5 ft 7 in)

Sport
- Country: China
- Sport: Badminton

Women's & mixed doubles
- Highest ranking: 20 (WD 14 January 2020); 23 (XD 22 August 2019)
- Current ranking: 162 (WD with Chen Xiaofei); 579 (XD with Wu Tuobin) (21 March 2023)
- BWF profile
Medal record
Women's badminton
Representing China
Asia Mixed Team Championships
Gold medal – first place	2019 Hong Kong	Mixed team
Asian Team Championships
Silver medal – second place	2018 Alor Setar	Women's team

Feng Xueying
- Traditional Chinese: 馮雪穎
- Simplified Chinese: 冯雪颖
Transcriptions
Standard Mandarin
- Hanyu Pinyin: Féng Xuěyǐng
- IPA: [fə̌ŋ ɕyɤ̀.ìŋ]

Feng Xueying (Chinese: 冯雪颖; pinyin: Féng Xuěyǐng; born 19 December 1998) is a Chinese badminton player. Feng helped the national team reach the final and win the silver medal at the 2018 Badminton Asia Team Championships held in Alor Setar, Malaysia.

== Achievements ==
=== BWF World Tour (4 titles, 1 runner-up) ===
The BWF World Tour, which was announced on 19 March 2017 and implemented in 2018, is a series of elite badminton tournaments sanctioned by the Badminton World Federation (BWF). The BWF World Tours are divided into levels of World Tour Finals, Super 1000, Super 750, Super 500, Super 300, and the BWF Tour Super 100.

Women's doubles
Year	Tournament	Level	Partner	Opponent	Score	Result
2023	Ruichang China Masters	Super 100	(China) Chen Xiaofei	(China) Keng Shuliang (China) Zhang Chi	21–15, 21–19	(gold) Winner
2024	Ruichang China Masters	Super 100	(China) Chen Xiaofei	(Thailand) Laksika Kanlaha (Thailand) Phataimas Muenwong	21–17, 15–21, 16–21	(silver) Runner-up
2024	Baoji China Masters	Super 100	(China) Chen Xiaofei	(China) Bao Lijing (China) Tang Ruizhi	21–15, 21–14	(gold) Winner
2025	Ruichang China Masters	Super 100	(China) Chen Xiaofei	(China) Qiao Shijun (China) Zheng Yu	21–17, 21–12	(gold) Winner

Mixed doubles
Year	Tournament	Level	Partner	Opponent	Score	Result
2018	Syed Modi International	Super 300	(China) Ou Xuanyi	(Indonesia) Rinov Rivaldy (Indonesia) Pitha Haningtyas Mentari	22–20, 21–10	(gold) Winner
