= Lin Hsiang-ti =

Taiwanese badminton player

Lin Hsiang-ti 林湘緹
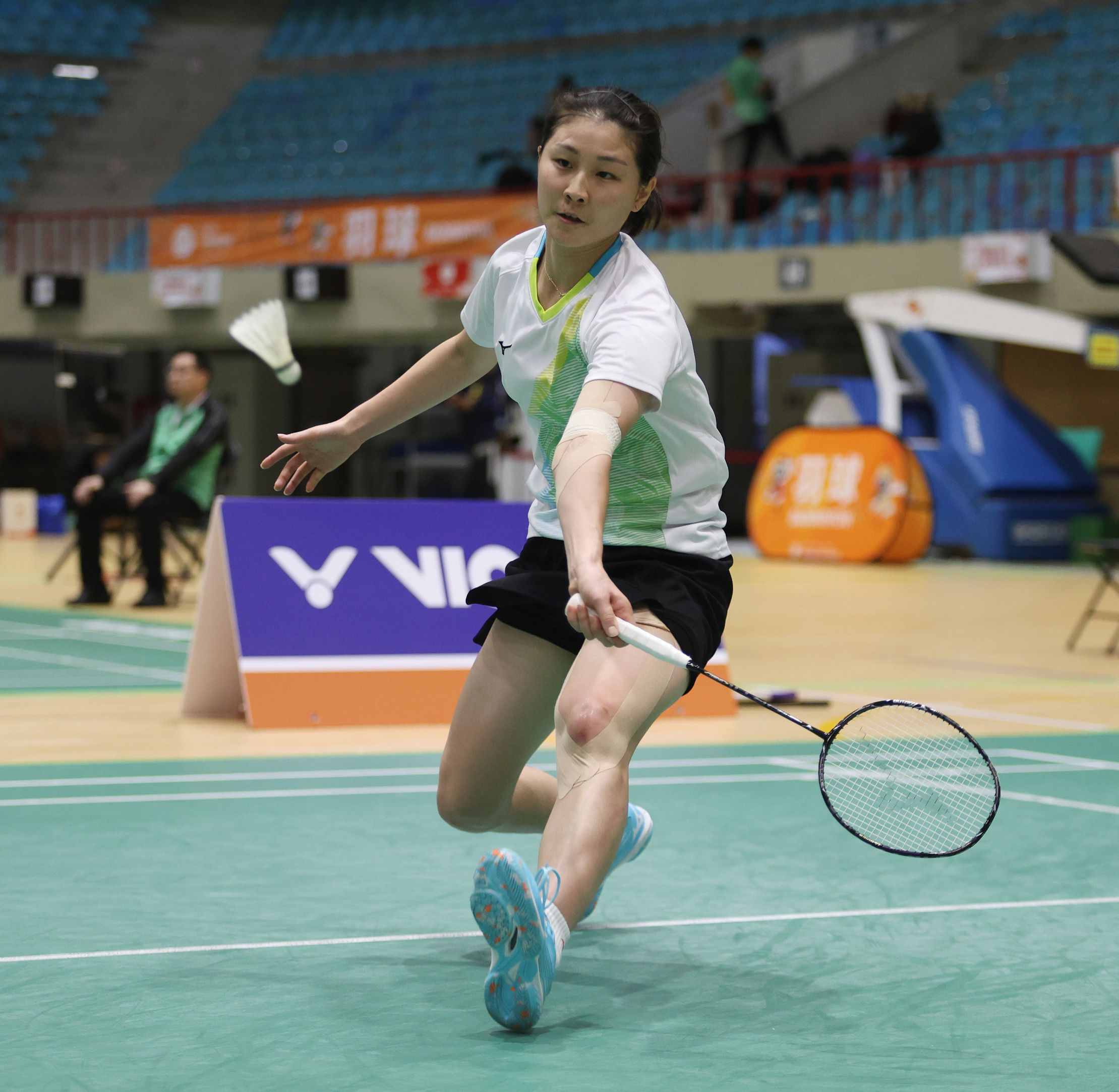
- Lin Hsiang-ti at the 2023 National Games of Taiwan

Personal information
- Born: 20 December 1998 (age 27) Taiwan
- Height: 1.69 m (5 ft 7 in)

Sport
- Country: Republic of China (Taiwan)
- Sport: Badminton
- Handedness: Left

Women's singles
- Highest ranking: 15 (2 June 2026)
- Current ranking: 17 (10 November 2026)
- BWF profile
Medal record
Women's badminton
Representing Chinese Taipei
Asia Team Championships
| Bronze medal – third place | 2026 Qingdao | Women's team |

Lin Hsiang-ti (born December 20, 1998) is a badminton player that born in Taiwan, representing Chinese Taipei.

== Achievement ==
=== BWF World Tour (1 title, 1 runner-up) ===
The BWF World Tour, which was announced on 19 March 2017 and implemented in 2018, is a series of elite badminton tournaments sanctioned by the Badminton World Federation (BWF). The BWF World Tour is divided into levels of World Tour Finals, Super 1000, Super 750, Super 500, Super 300, and the BWF Tour Super 100.

Women's singles

| Year | Tournament | Level | Opponent | Score | Result | Ref |
|---|---|---|---|---|---|---|
| 2023 | Ruichang China Masters | Super 100 | (China) Chen Lu | 13–21, 21–11, 22–20 | (gold) Winner | |
| 2024 | Macau Open | Super 300 | (China) Gao Fangjie | 23–21, 9–21, 11–21 | (silver) Runner-up | |

=== BWF International Challenge/Series & Future Series (1 title, 2 runners-up) ===
Women's singles

| Year | Tournament | Opponent | Score | Result | Ref |
|---|---|---|---|---|---|
| 2018 | Slovak Open | (Hong Kong) Deng Xuan | 11–21, 13–21 | (silver) Runner-up | |
| 2022 | Slovenia International | (India) Smit Toshniwal | 21–15, 21–14 | (gold) Winner | |
| 2022 | Croatian International | (Chinese Taipei) Huang Ching-ping | 13–21, 20–22 | (silver) Runner-up | |

BWF International Challenge tournament
BWF International Series tournament
BWF Future Series tournament
