= Chen Xiaofei =

Chinese badminton player

Chen Xiaofei 陈笑菲
Personal information
- Born: 10 October 1997 (age 29) Guangdong, China
- Height: 1.85 m (6 ft 1 in)

Sport
- Country: China
- Sport: Badminton

Women's & mixed doubles
- Highest ranking: 71 (WD with Zhou Chaomin); 45 (XD with Dong Weijie) (10 March 2020)
- Current ranking: 162 (WD with Feng Xueying) (21 March 2023)
- BWF profile
Medal record
Women's badminton
Representing China
Asia Mixed Team Championships
Gold medal – first place	2019 Hong Kong	Mixed team

Chen Xiaofei
- Traditional Chinese: 陳笑菲
- Simplified Chinese: 陈笑菲
Transcriptions
Standard Mandarin
- Hanyu Pinyin: Chén Xiàofēi

Chen Xiaofei (Chinese: 陈笑菲; pinyin: Chén Xiàofēǐ; born 10 October 1997) is a Chinese badminton player.

== Achievements ==
=== BWF World Tour (3 titles, 1 runner-up) ===
The BWF World Tour, which was announced on 19 March 2017 and implemented in 2018, is a series of elite badminton tournaments sanctioned by the Badminton World Federation (BWF). The BWF World Tours are divided into levels of World Tour Finals, Super 1000, Super 750, Super 500, Super 300, and the BWF Tour Super 100.

Women's doubles
Year	Tournament	Level	Partner	Opponent	Score	Result
2023	Ruichang China Masters	Super 100	(China) Feng Xueying	(China) Keng Shuliang (China) Zhang Chi	21–15, 21–19	(gold) Winner
2024	Ruichang China Masters	Super 100	(China) Feng Xueying	(Thailand) Laksika Kanlaha (Thailand) Phataimas Muenwong	21–17, 15–21, 16–21	(silver) Runner-up
2024	Baoji China Masters	Super 100	(China) Feng Xueying	(China) Bao Lijing (China) Tang Ruizhi	21–15, 21–14	(gold) Winner
2025	Ruichang China Masters	Super 100	(China) Feng Xueying	(China) Qiao Shijun (China) Zheng Yu	21–17, 21–12	(gold) Winner

=== BWF International Challenge/Series (1 title) ===
Mixed doubles
Year	Tournament	Partner	Opponent	Score	Result
2019	Malaysia International Challenge	(China) Dong Weijie	(Malaysia) Man Wei Chong (Malaysia) Pearly Tan	21–16, 21–19	(gold) Winner

BWF International Challenge tournament
BWF International Series tournament
