= 2019 BWF World Tour =

2019 badminton season

Tournament details
- Dates: 8 January – 15 December
- Edition: 2nd

The 2019 BWF World Tour (officially known as the 2019 HSBC BWF World Tour for sponsorship reasons) was the second season of the BWF World Tour of badminton, a circuit of 26 tournaments which led up to the World Tour Finals tournament. The 27 tournaments were divided into five levels: Level 1 was the said World Tour Finals, Level 2 called Super 1000 (three tournaments), Level 3 called Super 750 (five tournaments), Level 4 called Super 500 (seven tournaments) and Level 5 called Super 300 (11 tournaments). Each of these tournaments offered different ranking points and prize money. The highest points and prize pool were offered at the Super 1000 level (including the World Tour Finals).

One other category of tournament, the BWF Tour Super 100 (level 6), also offered BWF World Tour ranking points. BWF Tour Super 100 was an important part of the pathway and entry point for players into the BWF World Tour tournaments. When the 10 Level 6 grade tournaments of the BWF Tour Super 100 were included, the complete tour consisted of 37 tournaments.

== Results ==
Below is the schedule released by the Badminton World Federation:

=== Key ===
World Tour Finals
Super 1000
Super 750
Super 500
Super 300
Super 100

=== Winners ===
Tour	Report	Men's singles	Women's singles	Men's doubles	Women's doubles	Mixed doubles
World Tour Finals
BWF World Tour Finals	Report	(Japan) Kento Momota	(China) Chen Yufei	(Indonesia) Mohammad Ahsan (Indonesia) Hendra Setiawan	(China) Chen Qingchen (China) Jia Yifan	(China) Zheng Siwei (China) Huang Yaqiong
Super 1000
All England Open	Report	(Japan) Kento Momota	(China) Chen Yufei	(Indonesia) Mohammad Ahsan (Indonesia) Hendra Setiawan	(China) Chen Qingchen (China) Jia Yifan	(China) Zheng Siwei (China) Huang Yaqiong
Indonesia Open	Report	(Chinese Taipei) Chou Tien-chen	(Japan) Akane Yamaguchi	(Indonesia) Marcus Fernaldi Gideon (Indonesia) Kevin Sanjaya Sukamuljo	(Japan) Yuki Fukushima (Japan) Sayaka Hirota	(China) Zheng Siwei (China) Huang Yaqiong
China Open	Report	(Japan) Kento Momota	(Spain) Carolina Marín	(Indonesia) Marcus Fernaldi Gideon (Indonesia) Kevin Sanjaya Sukamuljo	(China) Chen Qingchen (China) Jia Yifan	(China) Zheng Siwei (China) Huang Yaqiong
Super 750
Malaysia Open	Report	(China) Lin Dan	(Chinese Taipei) Tai Tzu-ying	(China) Li Junhui (China) Liu Yuchen	(China) Chen Qingchen (China) Jia Yifan	(China) Zheng Siwei (China) Huang Yaqiong
Japan Open	Report	(Japan) Kento Momota	(Japan) Akane Yamaguchi	(Indonesia) Marcus Fernaldi Gideon (Indonesia) Kevin Sanjaya Sukamuljo	(South Korea) Kim So-yeong (South Korea) Kong Hee-yong	(China) Wang Yilyu (China) Huang Dongping
Denmark Open	Report	(Japan) Kento Momota	(Chinese Taipei) Tai Tzu-ying	(Indonesia) Marcus Fernaldi Gideon (Indonesia) Kevin Sanjaya Sukamuljo	(South Korea) Baek Ha-na (South Korea) Jung Kyung-eun	(Indonesia) Praveen Jordan (Indonesia) Melati Daeva Oktavianti
French Open	Report	(China) Chen Long	(South Korea) An Se-young	(Indonesia) Marcus Fernaldi Gideon (Indonesia) Kevin Sanjaya Sukamuljo	(South Korea) Lee So-hee (South Korea) Shin Seung-chan	(Indonesia) Praveen Jordan (Indonesia) Melati Daeva Oktavianti
Fuzhou China Open	Report	(Japan) Kento Momota	(China) Chen Yufei	(Indonesia) Marcus Fernaldi Gideon (Indonesia) Kevin Sanjaya Sukamuljo	(Japan) Yuki Fukushima (Japan) Sayaka Hirota	(China) Wang Yilyu (China) Huang Dongping
Super 500
Malaysia Masters	Report	(South Korea) Son Wan-ho	(Thailand) Ratchanok Intanon	(Indonesia) Marcus Fernaldi Gideon (Indonesia) Kevin Sanjaya Sukamuljo	(Japan) Yuki Fukushima (Japan) Sayaka Hirota	(Japan) Yuta Watanabe (Japan) Arisa Higashino
Indonesia Masters	Report	(Denmark) Anders Antonsen	(India) Saina Nehwal	(Indonesia) Marcus Fernaldi Gideon (Indonesia) Kevin Sanjaya Sukamuljo	(Japan) Misaki Matsutomo (Japan) Ayaka Takahashi	(China) Zheng Siwei (China) Huang Yaqiong
India Open	Report	(Denmark) Viktor Axelsen	(Thailand) Ratchanok Intanon	(Chinese Taipei) Lee Yang (Chinese Taipei) Wang Chi-lin	(Indonesia) Greysia Polii (Indonesia) Apriyani Rahayu	(China) Wang Yilyu (China) Huang Dongping
Singapore Open	Report	(Japan) Kento Momota	(Chinese Taipei) Tai Tzu-ying	(Japan) Takeshi Kamura (Japan) Keigo Sonoda	(Japan) Mayu Matsumoto (Japan) Wakana Nagahara	(Thailand) Dechapol Puavaranukroh (Thailand) Sapsiree Taerattanachai
Thailand Open	Report	(Chinese Taipei) Chou Tien-chen	(China) Chen Yufei	(India) Satwiksairaj Rankireddy (India) Chirag Shetty	(Japan) Shiho Tanaka (Japan) Koharu Yonemoto	(China) Wang Yilyu (China) Huang Dongping
Korea Open	Report	(Japan) Kento Momota	(China) He Bingjiao	(Indonesia) Fajar Alfian (Indonesia) Muhammad Rian Ardianto	(South Korea) Kim So-yeong (South Korea) Kong Hee-yong	(Thailand) Dechapol Puavaranukroh (Thailand) Sapsiree Taerattanachai
Hong Kong Open	Report	(Hong Kong) Lee Cheuk Yiu	(China) Chen Yufei	(South Korea) Choi Sol-gyu (South Korea) Seo Seung-jae	(China) Chen Qingchen (China) Jia Yifan	(Japan) Yuta Watanabe (Japan) Arisa Higashino
Super 300
Thailand Masters	Report	(Singapore) Loh Kean Yew	(Indonesia) Fitriani	(Malaysia) Goh V Shem (Malaysia) Tan Wee Kiong	(Thailand) Puttita Supajirakul (Thailand) Sapsiree Taerattanachai	(Malaysia) Chan Peng Soon (Malaysia) Goh Liu Ying
Spain Masters	Report	(Denmark) Viktor Axelsen	(Denmark) Mia Blichfeldt	(Chinese Taipei) Lee Yang (Chinese Taipei) Wang Chi-lin	(South Korea) Kim So-yeong (South Korea) Kong Hee-yong	(South Korea) Seo Seung-jae (South Korea) Chae Yoo-jung
German Open	Report	(Japan) Kento Momota	(Japan) Akane Yamaguchi	(Japan) Hiroyuki Endo (Japan) Yuta Watanabe	(China) Du Yue (China) Li Yinhui	(South Korea) Seo Seung-jae (South Korea) Chae Yoo-jung
Swiss Open	Report	(China) Shi Yuqi	(China) Chen Yufei	(Indonesia) Fajar Alfian (Indonesia) Muhammad Rian Ardianto	(South Korea) Chang Ye-na (South Korea) Jung Kyung-eun	(Denmark) Mathias Bay-Smidt (Denmark) Rikke Søby Hansen
New Zealand Open	Report	(Indonesia) Jonatan Christie	(South Korea) An Se-young	(Indonesia) Mohammad Ahsan (Indonesia) Hendra Setiawan	(South Korea) Kim So-yeong (South Korea) Kong Hee-yong	(Malaysia) Chan Peng Soon (Malaysia) Goh Liu Ying
Australian Open	Report	(Indonesia) Jonatan Christie	(China) Chen Yufei	(South Korea) Ko Sung-hyun (South Korea) Shin Baek-cheol	(Japan) Yuki Fukushima (Japan) Sayaka Hirota	(China) Wang Yilyu (China) Huang Dongping
U.S. Open	Report	(Chinese Taipei) Lin Chun-yi	(China) Wang Zhiyi	(South Korea) Ko Sung-hyun (South Korea) Shin Baek-cheol	(Japan) Nami Matsuyama (Japan) Chiharu Shida	(Chinese Taipei) Lee Jhe-huei (Chinese Taipei) Hsu Ya-ching
Chinese Taipei Open	Report	(Chinese Taipei) Chou Tien-chen	(South Korea) Sung Ji-hyun	(Malaysia) Goh V Shem (Malaysia) Tan Wee Kiong	(Thailand) Jongkolphan Kititharakul (Thailand) Rawinda Prajongjai	(Hong Kong) Tang Chun Man (Hong Kong) Tse Ying Suet
Macau Open	Report	(Thailand) Sitthikom Thammasin	(Canada) Michelle Li	(China) Li Junhui (China) Liu Yuchen	(China) Du Yue (China) Li Yinhui	(Thailand) Dechapol Puavaranukroh (Thailand) Sapsiree Taerattanachai
Korea Masters	Report	(Japan) Kanta Tsuneyama	(South Korea) An Se-young	(Chinese Taipei) Lee Yang (Chinese Taipei) Wang Chi-lin	(Japan) Nami Matsuyama (Japan) Chiharu Shida	(Hong Kong) Tang Chun Man (Hong Kong) Tse Ying Suet
Syed Modi International	Report	(Chinese Taipei) Wang Tzu-wei	(Spain) Carolina Marín	(China) He Jiting (China) Tan Qiang	(South Korea) Baek Ha-na (South Korea) Jung Kyung-eun	(Russia) Rodion Alimov (Russia) Alina Davletova
Super 100
Lingshui China Masters	Report	(China) Weng Hongyang	(South Korea) Kim Ga-eun	(Chinese Taipei) Lee Jhe-huei (Chinese Taipei) Yang Po-hsuan	(South Korea) Baek Ha-na (South Korea) Kim Hye-rin	(Hong Kong) Tang Chun Man (Hong Kong) Ng Tsz Yau
Orléans Masters	Report	(Japan) Koki Watanabe	(Japan) Saena Kawakami	(Chinese Taipei) Lee Yang (Chinese Taipei) Wang Chi-lin	(England) Chloe Birch (England) Lauren Smith	(France) Thom Gicquel (France) Delphine Delrue
Canada Open	Report	(China) Li Shifeng	(South Korea) An Se-young	(Denmark) Mathias Boe (Denmark) Mads Conrad-Petersen	(Australia) Setyana Mapasa (Australia) Gronya Somerville	(South Korea) Ko Sung-hyun (South Korea) Eom Hye-won
Russian Open	Report	(Indonesia) Shesar Hiren Rhustavito	(Chinese Taipei) Pai Yu-po	(Denmark) Mathias Boe (Denmark) Mads Conrad-Petersen	(Indonesia) Ni Ketut Mahadewi Istirani (Indonesia) Tania Oktaviani Kusumah	(Indonesia) Adnan Maulana (Indonesia) Mychelle Crhystine Bandaso
Hyderabad Open	Report	(India) Sourabh Verma	(Singapore) Yeo Jia Min	(Indonesia) Muhammad Shohibul Fikri (Indonesia) Bagas Maulana	(South Korea) Baek Ha-na (South Korea) Jung Kyung-eun	(Malaysia) Hoo Pang Ron (Malaysia) Cheah Yee See
Akita Masters	Report	(Indonesia) Firman Abdul Kholik	(South Korea) An Se-young	(China) Ou Xuanyi (China) Zhang Nan	(Japan) Ayako Sakuramoto (Japan) Yukiko Takahata	(South Korea) Ko Sung-hyun (South Korea) Eom Hye-won
Vietnam Open	Report	(India) Sourabh Verma	(China) Zhang Yiman	(South Korea) Choi Sol-gyu (South Korea) Seo Seung-jae	(Indonesia) Della Destiara Haris (Indonesia) Rizki Amelia Pradipta	(China) Guo Xinwa (China) Zhang Shuxian
Indonesia Masters Super 100	Report	(China) Sun Feixiang	(China) Wang Zhiyi	(China) Ou Xuanyi (China) Zhang Nan	(Indonesia) Siti Fadia Silva Ramadhanti (Indonesia) Ribka Sugiarto	(China) Guo Xinwa (China) Zhang Shuxian
Dutch Open	Report	(India) Lakshya Sen	(China) Wang Zhiyi	(Russia) Vladimir Ivanov (Russia) Ivan Sozonov	(Bulgaria) Gabriela Stoeva (Bulgaria) Stefani Stoeva	(Netherlands) Robin Tabeling (Netherlands) Selena Piek
SaarLorLux Open	Report	(India) Lakshya Sen	(China) Li Yun	(China) Di Zijian (China) Wang Chang	(China) Liu Xuanxuan (China) Xia Yuting	(China) Guo Xinwa (China) Zhang Shuxian

== Finals ==
=== January ===
Date	Tournament	Champions	Runners-up
8–13 January	Thailand Masters (Report): Host: Bangkok, Thailand; Venue: Indoor Stadium Huamark; Level: Super 300; Prize: $150,000; Format: 32MS/32WS/32MD/32WD/32XD	(Singapore) Loh Kean Yew	(China) Lin Dan
8–13 January	Thailand Masters (Report): Host: Bangkok, Thailand; Venue: Indoor Stadium Huamark; Level: Super 300; Prize: $150,000; Format: 32MS/32WS/32MD/32WD/32XD	Score: 21–19, 21–18	
8–13 January	Thailand Masters (Report): Host: Bangkok, Thailand; Venue: Indoor Stadium Huamark; Level: Super 300; Prize: $150,000; Format: 32MS/32WS/32MD/32WD/32XD	(Indonesia) Fitriani	(Thailand) Busanan Ongbamrungphan
8–13 January	Thailand Masters (Report): Host: Bangkok, Thailand; Venue: Indoor Stadium Huamark; Level: Super 300; Prize: $150,000; Format: 32MS/32WS/32MD/32WD/32XD	Score: 21–12, 21–14	
8–13 January	Thailand Masters (Report): Host: Bangkok, Thailand; Venue: Indoor Stadium Huamark; Level: Super 300; Prize: $150,000; Format: 32MS/32WS/32MD/32WD/32XD	(Malaysia) Goh V Shem (Malaysia) Tan Wee Kiong	(Chinese Taipei) Lu Ching-yao (Chinese Taipei) Yang Po-han
8–13 January	Thailand Masters (Report): Host: Bangkok, Thailand; Venue: Indoor Stadium Huamark; Level: Super 300; Prize: $150,000; Format: 32MS/32WS/32MD/32WD/32XD	Score: 21–13, 21–17	
8–13 January	Thailand Masters (Report): Host: Bangkok, Thailand; Venue: Indoor Stadium Huamark; Level: Super 300; Prize: $150,000; Format: 32MS/32WS/32MD/32WD/32XD	(Thailand) Puttita Supajirakul (Thailand) Sapsiree Taerattanachai	(China) Li Wenmei (China) Zheng Yu
8–13 January	Thailand Masters (Report): Host: Bangkok, Thailand; Venue: Indoor Stadium Huamark; Level: Super 300; Prize: $150,000; Format: 32MS/32WS/32MD/32WD/32XD	Score: 15–21, 21–15, 21–10	
8–13 January	Thailand Masters (Report): Host: Bangkok, Thailand; Venue: Indoor Stadium Huamark; Level: Super 300; Prize: $150,000; Format: 32MS/32WS/32MD/32WD/32XD	(Malaysia) Chan Peng Soon (Malaysia) Goh Liu Ying	(Thailand) Dechapol Puavaranukroh (Thailand) Sapsiree Taerattanachai
8–13 January	Thailand Masters (Report): Host: Bangkok, Thailand; Venue: Indoor Stadium Huamark; Level: Super 300; Prize: $150,000; Format: 32MS/32WS/32MD/32WD/32XD	Score: 21–16, 21–15	
15–20 January	Malaysia Masters (Report): Host: Kuala Lumpur, Malaysia; Venue: Axiata Arena; Level: Super 500; Prize: $350,000; Format: 32MS/32WS/32MD/32WD/32XD	(South Korea) Son Wan-ho	(China) Chen Long
15–20 January	Malaysia Masters (Report): Host: Kuala Lumpur, Malaysia; Venue: Axiata Arena; Level: Super 500; Prize: $350,000; Format: 32MS/32WS/32MD/32WD/32XD	Score: 21–17, 21–19	
15–20 January	Malaysia Masters (Report): Host: Kuala Lumpur, Malaysia; Venue: Axiata Arena; Level: Super 500; Prize: $350,000; Format: 32MS/32WS/32MD/32WD/32XD	(Thailand) Ratchanok Intanon	(Spain) Carolina Marín
15–20 January	Malaysia Masters (Report): Host: Kuala Lumpur, Malaysia; Venue: Axiata Arena; Level: Super 500; Prize: $350,000; Format: 32MS/32WS/32MD/32WD/32XD	Score: 21–9, 22–20	
15–20 January	Malaysia Masters (Report): Host: Kuala Lumpur, Malaysia; Venue: Axiata Arena; Level: Super 500; Prize: $350,000; Format: 32MS/32WS/32MD/32WD/32XD	(Indonesia) Marcus Fernaldi Gideon (Indonesia) Kevin Sanjaya Sukamuljo	(Malaysia) Ong Yew Sin (Malaysia) Teo Ee Yi
15–20 January	Malaysia Masters (Report): Host: Kuala Lumpur, Malaysia; Venue: Axiata Arena; Level: Super 500; Prize: $350,000; Format: 32MS/32WS/32MD/32WD/32XD	Score: 21–15, 21–16	
15–20 January	Malaysia Masters (Report): Host: Kuala Lumpur, Malaysia; Venue: Axiata Arena; Level: Super 500; Prize: $350,000; Format: 32MS/32WS/32MD/32WD/32XD	(Japan) Yuki Fukushima (Japan) Sayaka Hirota	(Indonesia) Greysia Polii (Indonesia) Apriyani Rahayu
15–20 January	Malaysia Masters (Report): Host: Kuala Lumpur, Malaysia; Venue: Axiata Arena; Level: Super 500; Prize: $350,000; Format: 32MS/32WS/32MD/32WD/32XD	Score: 18–21, 21–16, 21–16	
15–20 January	Malaysia Masters (Report): Host: Kuala Lumpur, Malaysia; Venue: Axiata Arena; Level: Super 500; Prize: $350,000; Format: 32MS/32WS/32MD/32WD/32XD	(Japan) Yuta Watanabe (Japan) Arisa Higashino	(Thailand) Dechapol Puavaranukroh (Thailand) Sapsiree Taerattanachai
15–20 January	Malaysia Masters (Report): Host: Kuala Lumpur, Malaysia; Venue: Axiata Arena; Level: Super 500; Prize: $350,000; Format: 32MS/32WS/32MD/32WD/32XD	Score: 21–18, 21–18	
22–27 January	Indonesia Masters (Report): Host: Jakarta, Indonesia; Venue: Istora Senayan; Level: Super 500; Prize: $350,000; Format: 32MS/32WS/32MD/32WD/32XD	(Denmark) Anders Antonsen	(Japan) Kento Momota
22–27 January	Indonesia Masters (Report): Host: Jakarta, Indonesia; Venue: Istora Senayan; Level: Super 500; Prize: $350,000; Format: 32MS/32WS/32MD/32WD/32XD	Score: 21–16, 14–21, 21–16	
22–27 January	Indonesia Masters (Report): Host: Jakarta, Indonesia; Venue: Istora Senayan; Level: Super 500; Prize: $350,000; Format: 32MS/32WS/32MD/32WD/32XD	(India) Saina Nehwal	(Spain) Carolina Marín
22–27 January	Indonesia Masters (Report): Host: Jakarta, Indonesia; Venue: Istora Senayan; Level: Super 500; Prize: $350,000; Format: 32MS/32WS/32MD/32WD/32XD	Score: 4–10 Retired	
22–27 January	Indonesia Masters (Report): Host: Jakarta, Indonesia; Venue: Istora Senayan; Level: Super 500; Prize: $350,000; Format: 32MS/32WS/32MD/32WD/32XD	(Indonesia) Marcus Fernaldi Gideon (Indonesia) Kevin Sanjaya Sukamuljo	(Indonesia) Mohammad Ahsan (Indonesia) Hendra Setiawan
22–27 January	Indonesia Masters (Report): Host: Jakarta, Indonesia; Venue: Istora Senayan; Level: Super 500; Prize: $350,000; Format: 32MS/32WS/32MD/32WD/32XD	Score: 21–17, 21–11	
22–27 January	Indonesia Masters (Report): Host: Jakarta, Indonesia; Venue: Istora Senayan; Level: Super 500; Prize: $350,000; Format: 32MS/32WS/32MD/32WD/32XD	(Japan) Misaki Matsutomo (Japan) Ayaka Takahashi	(South Korea) Kim So-yeong (South Korea) Kong Hee-yong
22–27 January	Indonesia Masters (Report): Host: Jakarta, Indonesia; Venue: Istora Senayan; Level: Super 500; Prize: $350,000; Format: 32MS/32WS/32MD/32WD/32XD	Score: 21–19, 21–15	
22–27 January	Indonesia Masters (Report): Host: Jakarta, Indonesia; Venue: Istora Senayan; Level: Super 500; Prize: $350,000; Format: 32MS/32WS/32MD/32WD/32XD	(China) Zheng Siwei (China) Huang Yaqiong	(Indonesia) Tontowi Ahmad (Indonesia) Liliyana Natsir
22–27 January	Indonesia Masters (Report): Host: Jakarta, Indonesia; Venue: Istora Senayan; Level: Super 500; Prize: $350,000; Format: 32MS/32WS/32MD/32WD/32XD	Score: 19–21, 21–19, 21–16	

=== February ===
Date	Tournament	Champions	Runners-up
19–24 February	Spain Masters (Report): Host: Barcelona, Spain; Venue: Pavelló de la Vall d'Hebron; Level: Super 300; Prize: $150,000; Format: 32MS/32WS/32MD/32WD/32XD	(Denmark) Viktor Axelsen	(Denmark) Anders Antonsen
19–24 February	Spain Masters (Report): Host: Barcelona, Spain; Venue: Pavelló de la Vall d'Hebron; Level: Super 300; Prize: $150,000; Format: 32MS/32WS/32MD/32WD/32XD	Score: 21–14, 21–11	
19–24 February	Spain Masters (Report): Host: Barcelona, Spain; Venue: Pavelló de la Vall d'Hebron; Level: Super 300; Prize: $150,000; Format: 32MS/32WS/32MD/32WD/32XD	(Denmark) Mia Blichfeldt	(Denmark) Line Kjærsfeldt
19–24 February	Spain Masters (Report): Host: Barcelona, Spain; Venue: Pavelló de la Vall d'Hebron; Level: Super 300; Prize: $150,000; Format: 32MS/32WS/32MD/32WD/32XD	Score: 21–14, 21–14	
19–24 February	Spain Masters (Report): Host: Barcelona, Spain; Venue: Pavelló de la Vall d'Hebron; Level: Super 300; Prize: $150,000; Format: 32MS/32WS/32MD/32WD/32XD	(Chinese Taipei) Lee Yang (Chinese Taipei) Wang Chi-lin	(South Korea) Kim Won-ho (South Korea) Seo Seung-jae
19–24 February	Spain Masters (Report): Host: Barcelona, Spain; Venue: Pavelló de la Vall d'Hebron; Level: Super 300; Prize: $150,000; Format: 32MS/32WS/32MD/32WD/32XD	Score: 21–8, 23–21	
19–24 February	Spain Masters (Report): Host: Barcelona, Spain; Venue: Pavelló de la Vall d'Hebron; Level: Super 300; Prize: $150,000; Format: 32MS/32WS/32MD/32WD/32XD	(South Korea) Kim So-yeong (South Korea) Kong Hee-yong	(Japan) Nami Matsuyama (Japan) Chiharu Shida
19–24 February	Spain Masters (Report): Host: Barcelona, Spain; Venue: Pavelló de la Vall d'Hebron; Level: Super 300; Prize: $150,000; Format: 32MS/32WS/32MD/32WD/32XD	Score: 23–21, 15–21, 21–17	
19–24 February	Spain Masters (Report): Host: Barcelona, Spain; Venue: Pavelló de la Vall d'Hebron; Level: Super 300; Prize: $150,000; Format: 32MS/32WS/32MD/32WD/32XD	(South Korea) Seo Seung-jae (South Korea) Chae Yoo-jung	(Chinese Taipei) Wang Chi-lin (Chinese Taipei) Cheng Chi-ya
19–24 February	Spain Masters (Report): Host: Barcelona, Spain; Venue: Pavelló de la Vall d'Hebron; Level: Super 300; Prize: $150,000; Format: 32MS/32WS/32MD/32WD/32XD	Score: 21–18, 21–15	
26 February – 3 March	German Open (Report): Host: Mülheim, Germany; Venue: Innogy Sporthalle; Level: Super 300; Prize: $150,000; Format: 32MS/32WS/32MD/32WD/32XD	(Japan) Kento Momota	(Japan) Kenta Nishimoto
26 February – 3 March	German Open (Report): Host: Mülheim, Germany; Venue: Innogy Sporthalle; Level: Super 300; Prize: $150,000; Format: 32MS/32WS/32MD/32WD/32XD	Score: 21–10, 21–16	
26 February – 3 March	German Open (Report): Host: Mülheim, Germany; Venue: Innogy Sporthalle; Level: Super 300; Prize: $150,000; Format: 32MS/32WS/32MD/32WD/32XD	(Japan) Akane Yamaguchi	(Thailand) Ratchanok Intanon
26 February – 3 March	German Open (Report): Host: Mülheim, Germany; Venue: Innogy Sporthalle; Level: Super 300; Prize: $150,000; Format: 32MS/32WS/32MD/32WD/32XD	Score: 16–21, 21–14, 25–23	
26 February – 3 March	German Open (Report): Host: Mülheim, Germany; Venue: Innogy Sporthalle; Level: Super 300; Prize: $150,000; Format: 32MS/32WS/32MD/32WD/32XD	(Japan) Hiroyuki Endo (Japan) Yuta Watanabe	(Japan) Takeshi Kamura (Japan) Keigo Sonoda
26 February – 3 March	German Open (Report): Host: Mülheim, Germany; Venue: Innogy Sporthalle; Level: Super 300; Prize: $150,000; Format: 32MS/32WS/32MD/32WD/32XD	Score: 15–21, 21–11, 21–12	
26 February – 3 March	German Open (Report): Host: Mülheim, Germany; Venue: Innogy Sporthalle; Level: Super 300; Prize: $150,000; Format: 32MS/32WS/32MD/32WD/32XD	(China) Du Yue (China) Li Yinhui	(Japan) Misaki Matsutomo (Japan) Ayaka Takahashi
26 February – 3 March	German Open (Report): Host: Mülheim, Germany; Venue: Innogy Sporthalle; Level: Super 300; Prize: $150,000; Format: 32MS/32WS/32MD/32WD/32XD	Score: 22–20, 21–15	
26 February – 3 March	German Open (Report): Host: Mülheim, Germany; Venue: Innogy Sporthalle; Level: Super 300; Prize: $150,000; Format: 32MS/32WS/32MD/32WD/32XD	(South Korea) Seo Seung-jae (South Korea) Chae Yoo-jung	(Indonesia) Hafiz Faizal (Indonesia) Gloria Emanuelle Widjaja
26 February – 3 March	German Open (Report): Host: Mülheim, Germany; Venue: Innogy Sporthalle; Level: Super 300; Prize: $150,000; Format: 32MS/32WS/32MD/32WD/32XD	Score: 21–17, 21–11	

=== March ===
Date	Tournament	Champions	Runners-up
6–10 March	All England Open (Report): Host: Birmingham, England; Venue: Arena Birmingham; Level: Super 1000; Prize: $1,000,000; Format: 32MS/32WS/32MD/32WD/32XD	(Japan) Kento Momota	(Denmark) Viktor Axelsen
6–10 March	All England Open (Report): Host: Birmingham, England; Venue: Arena Birmingham; Level: Super 1000; Prize: $1,000,000; Format: 32MS/32WS/32MD/32WD/32XD	Score: 21–11, 15–21, 21–15	
6–10 March	All England Open (Report): Host: Birmingham, England; Venue: Arena Birmingham; Level: Super 1000; Prize: $1,000,000; Format: 32MS/32WS/32MD/32WD/32XD	(China) Chen Yufei	(Chinese Taipei) Tai Tzu-ying
6–10 March	All England Open (Report): Host: Birmingham, England; Venue: Arena Birmingham; Level: Super 1000; Prize: $1,000,000; Format: 32MS/32WS/32MD/32WD/32XD	Score: 21–17, 21–17	
6–10 March	All England Open (Report): Host: Birmingham, England; Venue: Arena Birmingham; Level: Super 1000; Prize: $1,000,000; Format: 32MS/32WS/32MD/32WD/32XD	(Indonesia) Mohammad Ahsan (Indonesia) Hendra Setiawan	(Malaysia) Aaron Chia (Malaysia) Soh Wooi Yik
6–10 March	All England Open (Report): Host: Birmingham, England; Venue: Arena Birmingham; Level: Super 1000; Prize: $1,000,000; Format: 32MS/32WS/32MD/32WD/32XD	Score: 11–21, 21–14, 21–12	
6–10 March	All England Open (Report): Host: Birmingham, England; Venue: Arena Birmingham; Level: Super 1000; Prize: $1,000,000; Format: 32MS/32WS/32MD/32WD/32XD	(China) Chen Qingchen (China) Jia Yifan	(Japan) Mayu Matsumoto (Japan) Wakana Nagahara
6–10 March	All England Open (Report): Host: Birmingham, England; Venue: Arena Birmingham; Level: Super 1000; Prize: $1,000,000; Format: 32MS/32WS/32MD/32WD/32XD	Score: 18–21, 22–20, 21–11	
6–10 March	All England Open (Report): Host: Birmingham, England; Venue: Arena Birmingham; Level: Super 1000; Prize: $1,000,000; Format: 32MS/32WS/32MD/32WD/32XD	(China) Zheng Siwei (China) Huang Yaqiong	(Japan) Yuta Watanabe (Japan) Arisa Higashino
6–10 March	All England Open (Report): Host: Birmingham, England; Venue: Arena Birmingham; Level: Super 1000; Prize: $1,000,000; Format: 32MS/32WS/32MD/32WD/32XD	Score: 21–17, 22–20	
12–17 March	Swiss Open (Report): Host: Basel, Switzerland; Venue: St. Jakobshalle; Level: Super 300; Prize: $150,000; Format: 32MS/32WS/32MD/32WD/32XD	(China) Shi Yuqi	(India) B. Sai Praneeth
12–17 March	Swiss Open (Report): Host: Basel, Switzerland; Venue: St. Jakobshalle; Level: Super 300; Prize: $150,000; Format: 32MS/32WS/32MD/32WD/32XD	Score: 19–21, 21–18, 21–12	
12–17 March	Swiss Open (Report): Host: Basel, Switzerland; Venue: St. Jakobshalle; Level: Super 300; Prize: $150,000; Format: 32MS/32WS/32MD/32WD/32XD	(China) Chen Yufei	(Japan) Saena Kawakami
12–17 March	Swiss Open (Report): Host: Basel, Switzerland; Venue: St. Jakobshalle; Level: Super 300; Prize: $150,000; Format: 32MS/32WS/32MD/32WD/32XD	Score: 21–9, 21–16	
12–17 March	Swiss Open (Report): Host: Basel, Switzerland; Venue: St. Jakobshalle; Level: Super 300; Prize: $150,000; Format: 32MS/32WS/32MD/32WD/32XD	(Indonesia) Fajar Alfian (Indonesia) Muhammad Rian Ardianto	(Chinese Taipei) Lee Yang (Chinese Taipei) Wang Chi-lin
12–17 March	Swiss Open (Report): Host: Basel, Switzerland; Venue: St. Jakobshalle; Level: Super 300; Prize: $150,000; Format: 32MS/32WS/32MD/32WD/32XD	Score: 21–19, 21–16	
12–17 March	Swiss Open (Report): Host: Basel, Switzerland; Venue: St. Jakobshalle; Level: Super 300; Prize: $150,000; Format: 32MS/32WS/32MD/32WD/32XD	(South Korea) Chang Ye-na (South Korea) Jung Kyung-eun	(Japan) Nami Matsuyama (Japan) Chiharu Shida
12–17 March	Swiss Open (Report): Host: Basel, Switzerland; Venue: St. Jakobshalle; Level: Super 300; Prize: $150,000; Format: 32MS/32WS/32MD/32WD/32XD	Score: 21–16, 21–13	
12–17 March	Swiss Open (Report): Host: Basel, Switzerland; Venue: St. Jakobshalle; Level: Super 300; Prize: $150,000; Format: 32MS/32WS/32MD/32WD/32XD	(Denmark) Mathias Bay-Smidt (Denmark) Rikke Søby Hansen	(Indonesia) Rinov Rivaldy (Indonesia) Pitha Haningtyas Mentari
12–17 March	Swiss Open (Report): Host: Basel, Switzerland; Venue: St. Jakobshalle; Level: Super 300; Prize: $150,000; Format: 32MS/32WS/32MD/32WD/32XD	Score: 21–18, 12–21, 21–16	
12–17 March	Lingshui China Masters (Report): Host: Lingshui, China; Venue: Agile Stadium of Lingshui Culture and Sport Square; Level: Super 100; Prize: $75,000; Format: 64MS/32WS/32MD/32WD/32XD	(China) Weng Hongyang	(China) Liu Haichao
12–17 March	Lingshui China Masters (Report): Host: Lingshui, China; Venue: Agile Stadium of Lingshui Culture and Sport Square; Level: Super 100; Prize: $75,000; Format: 64MS/32WS/32MD/32WD/32XD	Score: 21–7, 21–7	
12–17 March	Lingshui China Masters (Report): Host: Lingshui, China; Venue: Agile Stadium of Lingshui Culture and Sport Square; Level: Super 100; Prize: $75,000; Format: 64MS/32WS/32MD/32WD/32XD	(South Korea) Kim Ga-eun	(China) Zhang Yiman
12–17 March	Lingshui China Masters (Report): Host: Lingshui, China; Venue: Agile Stadium of Lingshui Culture and Sport Square; Level: Super 100; Prize: $75,000; Format: 64MS/32WS/32MD/32WD/32XD	Score: 22–20, 14–21, 21–17	
12–17 March	Lingshui China Masters (Report): Host: Lingshui, China; Venue: Agile Stadium of Lingshui Culture and Sport Square; Level: Super 100; Prize: $75,000; Format: 64MS/32WS/32MD/32WD/32XD	(Chinese Taipei) Lee Jhe-huei (Chinese Taipei) Yang Po-hsuan	(China) Ou Xuanyi (China) Ren Xiangyu
12–17 March	Lingshui China Masters (Report): Host: Lingshui, China; Venue: Agile Stadium of Lingshui Culture and Sport Square; Level: Super 100; Prize: $75,000; Format: 64MS/32WS/32MD/32WD/32XD	Score: 21–17, 21–16	
12–17 March	Lingshui China Masters (Report): Host: Lingshui, China; Venue: Agile Stadium of Lingshui Culture and Sport Square; Level: Super 100; Prize: $75,000; Format: 64MS/32WS/32MD/32WD/32XD	(South Korea) Baek Ha-na (South Korea) Kim Hye-rin	(China) Liu Xuanxuan (China) Xia Yuting
12–17 March	Lingshui China Masters (Report): Host: Lingshui, China; Venue: Agile Stadium of Lingshui Culture and Sport Square; Level: Super 100; Prize: $75,000; Format: 64MS/32WS/32MD/32WD/32XD	Score: 21–14, 14–21, 21–15	
12–17 March	Lingshui China Masters (Report): Host: Lingshui, China; Venue: Agile Stadium of Lingshui Culture and Sport Square; Level: Super 100; Prize: $75,000; Format: 64MS/32WS/32MD/32WD/32XD	(Hong Kong) Tang Chun Man (Hong Kong) Ng Tsz Yau	(China) Guo Xinwa (China) Liu Xuanxuan
12–17 March	Lingshui China Masters (Report): Host: Lingshui, China; Venue: Agile Stadium of Lingshui Culture and Sport Square; Level: Super 100; Prize: $75,000; Format: 64MS/32WS/32MD/32WD/32XD	Score: 16–21, 21–14, 21–13	
19–24 March	Orléans Masters (Report): Host: Orléans, France; Venue: Palais des Sports; Level: Super 100; Prize: $75,000; Format: 64MS/32WS/32MD/32WD/32XD	(Japan) Koki Watanabe	(France) Thomas Rouxel
19–24 March	Orléans Masters (Report): Host: Orléans, France; Venue: Palais des Sports; Level: Super 100; Prize: $75,000; Format: 64MS/32WS/32MD/32WD/32XD	Score: 18–21, 21–12, 21–19	
19–24 March	Orléans Masters (Report): Host: Orléans, France; Venue: Palais des Sports; Level: Super 100; Prize: $75,000; Format: 64MS/32WS/32MD/32WD/32XD	(Japan) Saena Kawakami	(Scotland) Kirsty Gilmour
19–24 March	Orléans Masters (Report): Host: Orléans, France; Venue: Palais des Sports; Level: Super 100; Prize: $75,000; Format: 64MS/32WS/32MD/32WD/32XD	Score: 21–8, 18–21, 21–16	
19–24 March	Orléans Masters (Report): Host: Orléans, France; Venue: Palais des Sports; Level: Super 100; Prize: $75,000; Format: 64MS/32WS/32MD/32WD/32XD	(Chinese Taipei) Lee Yang (Chinese Taipei) Wang Chi-lin	(Japan) Akira Koga (Japan) Taichi Saito
19–24 March	Orléans Masters (Report): Host: Orléans, France; Venue: Palais des Sports; Level: Super 100; Prize: $75,000; Format: 64MS/32WS/32MD/32WD/32XD	Score: 16–21, 22–20, 21–15	
19–24 March	Orléans Masters (Report): Host: Orléans, France; Venue: Palais des Sports; Level: Super 100; Prize: $75,000; Format: 64MS/32WS/32MD/32WD/32XD	(England) Chloe Birch (England) Lauren Smith	(Chinese Taipei) Hsu Ya-ching (Chinese Taipei) Hu Ling-fang
19–24 March	Orléans Masters (Report): Host: Orléans, France; Venue: Palais des Sports; Level: Super 100; Prize: $75,000; Format: 64MS/32WS/32MD/32WD/32XD	Score: 21–18, 21–17	
19–24 March	Orléans Masters (Report): Host: Orléans, France; Venue: Palais des Sports; Level: Super 100; Prize: $75,000; Format: 64MS/32WS/32MD/32WD/32XD	(France) Thom Gicquel (France) Delphine Delrue	(France) Ronan Labar (France) Anne Tran
19–24 March	Orléans Masters (Report): Host: Orléans, France; Venue: Palais des Sports; Level: Super 100; Prize: $75,000; Format: 64MS/32WS/32MD/32WD/32XD	Score: 21–11, 21–14	
26–31 March	India Open (Report): Host: New Delhi, India; Venue: K. D. Jadhav Indoor Stadium; Level: Super 500; Prize: $350,000; Format: 32MS/32WS/32MD/32WD/32XD	(Denmark) Viktor Axelsen	(India) Srikanth Kidambi
26–31 March	India Open (Report): Host: New Delhi, India; Venue: K. D. Jadhav Indoor Stadium; Level: Super 500; Prize: $350,000; Format: 32MS/32WS/32MD/32WD/32XD	Score: 21–7, 22–20	
26–31 March	India Open (Report): Host: New Delhi, India; Venue: K. D. Jadhav Indoor Stadium; Level: Super 500; Prize: $350,000; Format: 32MS/32WS/32MD/32WD/32XD	(Thailand) Ratchanok Intanon	(China) He Bingjiao
26–31 March	India Open (Report): Host: New Delhi, India; Venue: K. D. Jadhav Indoor Stadium; Level: Super 500; Prize: $350,000; Format: 32MS/32WS/32MD/32WD/32XD	Score: 21–15, 21–14	
26–31 March	India Open (Report): Host: New Delhi, India; Venue: K. D. Jadhav Indoor Stadium; Level: Super 500; Prize: $350,000; Format: 32MS/32WS/32MD/32WD/32XD	(Chinese Taipei) Lee Yang (Chinese Taipei) Wang Chi-lin	(Indonesia) Ricky Karanda Suwardi (Indonesia) Angga Pratama
26–31 March	India Open (Report): Host: New Delhi, India; Venue: K. D. Jadhav Indoor Stadium; Level: Super 500; Prize: $350,000; Format: 32MS/32WS/32MD/32WD/32XD	Score: 21–14, 21–14	
26–31 March	India Open (Report): Host: New Delhi, India; Venue: K. D. Jadhav Indoor Stadium; Level: Super 500; Prize: $350,000; Format: 32MS/32WS/32MD/32WD/32XD	(Indonesia) Greysia Polii (Indonesia) Apriyani Rahayu	(Malaysia) Chow Mei Kuan (Malaysia) Lee Meng Yean
26–31 March	India Open (Report): Host: New Delhi, India; Venue: K. D. Jadhav Indoor Stadium; Level: Super 500; Prize: $350,000; Format: 32MS/32WS/32MD/32WD/32XD	Score: 21–11, 25–23	
26–31 March	India Open (Report): Host: New Delhi, India; Venue: K. D. Jadhav Indoor Stadium; Level: Super 500; Prize: $350,000; Format: 32MS/32WS/32MD/32WD/32XD	(China) Wang Yilyu (China) Huang Dongping	(Indonesia) Praveen Jordan (Indonesia) Melati Daeva Oktavianti
26–31 March	India Open (Report): Host: New Delhi, India; Venue: K. D. Jadhav Indoor Stadium; Level: Super 500; Prize: $350,000; Format: 32MS/32WS/32MD/32WD/32XD	Score: 21–13, 21–11	

=== April ===
Date	Tournament	Champions	Runners-up
2–7 April	Malaysia Open (Report): Host: Kuala Lumpur, Malaysia; Venue: Axiata Arena; Level: Super 750; Prize: $700,000; Format: 32MS/32WS/32MD/32WD/32XD	(China) Lin Dan	(China) Chen Long
2–7 April	Malaysia Open (Report): Host: Kuala Lumpur, Malaysia; Venue: Axiata Arena; Level: Super 750; Prize: $700,000; Format: 32MS/32WS/32MD/32WD/32XD	Score: 9–21, 21–17, 21–11	
2–7 April	Malaysia Open (Report): Host: Kuala Lumpur, Malaysia; Venue: Axiata Arena; Level: Super 750; Prize: $700,000; Format: 32MS/32WS/32MD/32WD/32XD	(Chinese Taipei) Tai Tzu-ying	(Japan) Akane Yamaguchi
2–7 April	Malaysia Open (Report): Host: Kuala Lumpur, Malaysia; Venue: Axiata Arena; Level: Super 750; Prize: $700,000; Format: 32MS/32WS/32MD/32WD/32XD	Score: 21–16, 21–19	
2–7 April	Malaysia Open (Report): Host: Kuala Lumpur, Malaysia; Venue: Axiata Arena; Level: Super 750; Prize: $700,000; Format: 32MS/32WS/32MD/32WD/32XD	(China) Li Junhui (China) Liu Yuchen	(Japan) Takeshi Kamura (Japan) Keigo Sonoda
2–7 April	Malaysia Open (Report): Host: Kuala Lumpur, Malaysia; Venue: Axiata Arena; Level: Super 750; Prize: $700,000; Format: 32MS/32WS/32MD/32WD/32XD	Score: 21–12, 21–17	
2–7 April	Malaysia Open (Report): Host: Kuala Lumpur, Malaysia; Venue: Axiata Arena; Level: Super 750; Prize: $700,000; Format: 32MS/32WS/32MD/32WD/32XD	(China) Chen Qingchen (China) Jia Yifan	(China) Du Yue (China) Li Yinhui
2–7 April	Malaysia Open (Report): Host: Kuala Lumpur, Malaysia; Venue: Axiata Arena; Level: Super 750; Prize: $700,000; Format: 32MS/32WS/32MD/32WD/32XD	Score: 21–14, 21–15	
2–7 April	Malaysia Open (Report): Host: Kuala Lumpur, Malaysia; Venue: Axiata Arena; Level: Super 750; Prize: $700,000; Format: 32MS/32WS/32MD/32WD/32XD	(China) Zheng Siwei (China) Huang Yaqiong	(China) Wang Yilyu (China) Huang Dongping
2–7 April	Malaysia Open (Report): Host: Kuala Lumpur, Malaysia; Venue: Axiata Arena; Level: Super 750; Prize: $700,000; Format: 32MS/32WS/32MD/32WD/32XD	Score: 21–17, 21–13	
9–14 April	Singapore Open (Report): Host: Singapore; Venue: Singapore Indoor Stadium; Level: Super 500; Prize: $355,000; Format: 32MS/32WS/32MD/32WD/32XD	(Japan) Kento Momota	(Indonesia) Anthony Sinisuka Ginting
9–14 April	Singapore Open (Report): Host: Singapore; Venue: Singapore Indoor Stadium; Level: Super 500; Prize: $355,000; Format: 32MS/32WS/32MD/32WD/32XD	Score: 10–21, 21–19, 21–13	
9–14 April	Singapore Open (Report): Host: Singapore; Venue: Singapore Indoor Stadium; Level: Super 500; Prize: $355,000; Format: 32MS/32WS/32MD/32WD/32XD	(Chinese Taipei) Tai Tzu-ying	(Japan) Nozomi Okuhara
9–14 April	Singapore Open (Report): Host: Singapore; Venue: Singapore Indoor Stadium; Level: Super 500; Prize: $355,000; Format: 32MS/32WS/32MD/32WD/32XD	Score: 21–19, 21–15	
9–14 April	Singapore Open (Report): Host: Singapore; Venue: Singapore Indoor Stadium; Level: Super 500; Prize: $355,000; Format: 32MS/32WS/32MD/32WD/32XD	(Japan) Takeshi Kamura (Japan) Keigo Sonoda	(Indonesia) Mohammad Ahsan (Indonesia) Hendra Setiawan
9–14 April	Singapore Open (Report): Host: Singapore; Venue: Singapore Indoor Stadium; Level: Super 500; Prize: $355,000; Format: 32MS/32WS/32MD/32WD/32XD	Score: 21–13, 19–21, 21–17	
9–14 April	Singapore Open (Report): Host: Singapore; Venue: Singapore Indoor Stadium; Level: Super 500; Prize: $355,000; Format: 32MS/32WS/32MD/32WD/32XD	(Japan) Mayu Matsumoto (Japan) Wakana Nagahara	(South Korea) Kim Hye-jeong (South Korea) Kong Hee-yong
9–14 April	Singapore Open (Report): Host: Singapore; Venue: Singapore Indoor Stadium; Level: Super 500; Prize: $355,000; Format: 32MS/32WS/32MD/32WD/32XD	Score: 21–17, 22–20	
9–14 April	Singapore Open (Report): Host: Singapore; Venue: Singapore Indoor Stadium; Level: Super 500; Prize: $355,000; Format: 32MS/32WS/32MD/32WD/32XD	(Thailand) Dechapol Puavaranukroh (Thailand) Sapsiree Taerattanachai	(Malaysia) Tan Kian Meng (Malaysia) Lai Pei Jing
9–14 April	Singapore Open (Report): Host: Singapore; Venue: Singapore Indoor Stadium; Level: Super 500; Prize: $355,000; Format: 32MS/32WS/32MD/32WD/32XD	Score: 21–14, 21–6	
30 April – 5 May	New Zealand Open (Report): Host: Auckland, New Zealand; Venue: Eventfinda Stadium; Level: Super 300; Prize: $150,000; Format: 32MS/32WS/32MD/32WD/32XD	(Indonesia) Jonatan Christie	(Hong Kong) Ng Ka Long
30 April – 5 May	New Zealand Open (Report): Host: Auckland, New Zealand; Venue: Eventfinda Stadium; Level: Super 300; Prize: $150,000; Format: 32MS/32WS/32MD/32WD/32XD	Score: 21–12, 21–13	
30 April – 5 May	New Zealand Open (Report): Host: Auckland, New Zealand; Venue: Eventfinda Stadium; Level: Super 300; Prize: $150,000; Format: 32MS/32WS/32MD/32WD/32XD	(South Korea) An Se-young	(China) Li Xuerui
30 April – 5 May	New Zealand Open (Report): Host: Auckland, New Zealand; Venue: Eventfinda Stadium; Level: Super 300; Prize: $150,000; Format: 32MS/32WS/32MD/32WD/32XD	Score: 21–19, 21–15	
30 April – 5 May	New Zealand Open (Report): Host: Auckland, New Zealand; Venue: Eventfinda Stadium; Level: Super 300; Prize: $150,000; Format: 32MS/32WS/32MD/32WD/32XD	(Indonesia) Mohammad Ahsan (Indonesia) Hendra Setiawan	(Japan) Hiroyuki Endo (Japan) Yuta Watanabe
30 April – 5 May	New Zealand Open (Report): Host: Auckland, New Zealand; Venue: Eventfinda Stadium; Level: Super 300; Prize: $150,000; Format: 32MS/32WS/32MD/32WD/32XD	Score: 20–22, 21–15, 21–17	
30 April – 5 May	New Zealand Open (Report): Host: Auckland, New Zealand; Venue: Eventfinda Stadium; Level: Super 300; Prize: $150,000; Format: 32MS/32WS/32MD/32WD/32XD	(South Korea) Kim So-yeong (South Korea) Kong Hee-yong	(Japan) Misaki Matsutomo (Japan) Ayaka Takahashi
30 April – 5 May	New Zealand Open (Report): Host: Auckland, New Zealand; Venue: Eventfinda Stadium; Level: Super 300; Prize: $150,000; Format: 32MS/32WS/32MD/32WD/32XD	Score: 21–15, 21–18	
30 April – 5 May	New Zealand Open (Report): Host: Auckland, New Zealand; Venue: Eventfinda Stadium; Level: Super 300; Prize: $150,000; Format: 32MS/32WS/32MD/32WD/32XD	(Malaysia) Chan Peng Soon (Malaysia) Goh Liu Ying	(Indonesia) Praveen Jordan (Indonesia) Melati Daeva Oktavianti
30 April – 5 May	New Zealand Open (Report): Host: Auckland, New Zealand; Venue: Eventfinda Stadium; Level: Super 300; Prize: $150,000; Format: 32MS/32WS/32MD/32WD/32XD	Score: 21–14, 16–21, 29–27	

=== May ===
No World Tour tournaments were held in May.

=== June ===
Date	Tournament	Champions	Runners-up
4–9 June	Australian Open (Report): Host: Sydney, Australia; Venue: Quaycentre; Level: Super 300; Prize: $150,000; Format: 32MS/32WS/32MD/32WD/32XD	(Indonesia) Jonatan Christie	(Indonesia) Anthony Sinisuka Ginting
4–9 June	Australian Open (Report): Host: Sydney, Australia; Venue: Quaycentre; Level: Super 300; Prize: $150,000; Format: 32MS/32WS/32MD/32WD/32XD	Score: 21–17, 13–21, 21–14	
4–9 June	Australian Open (Report): Host: Sydney, Australia; Venue: Quaycentre; Level: Super 300; Prize: $150,000; Format: 32MS/32WS/32MD/32WD/32XD	(China) Chen Yufei	(Japan) Nozomi Okuhara
4–9 June	Australian Open (Report): Host: Sydney, Australia; Venue: Quaycentre; Level: Super 300; Prize: $150,000; Format: 32MS/32WS/32MD/32WD/32XD	Score: 21–15, 21–3	
4–9 June	Australian Open (Report): Host: Sydney, Australia; Venue: Quaycentre; Level: Super 300; Prize: $150,000; Format: 32MS/32WS/32MD/32WD/32XD	(South Korea) Ko Sung-hyun (South Korea) Shin Baek-cheol	(Japan) Takeshi Kamura (Japan) Keigo Sonoda
4–9 June	Australian Open (Report): Host: Sydney, Australia; Venue: Quaycentre; Level: Super 300; Prize: $150,000; Format: 32MS/32WS/32MD/32WD/32XD	Score: 21–11, 21–17	
4–9 June	Australian Open (Report): Host: Sydney, Australia; Venue: Quaycentre; Level: Super 300; Prize: $150,000; Format: 32MS/32WS/32MD/32WD/32XD	(Japan) Yuki Fukushima (Japan) Sayaka Hirota	(China) Chen Qingchen (China) Jia Yifan
4–9 June	Australian Open (Report): Host: Sydney, Australia; Venue: Quaycentre; Level: Super 300; Prize: $150,000; Format: 32MS/32WS/32MD/32WD/32XD	Score: 21–10, 21–16	
4–9 June	Australian Open (Report): Host: Sydney, Australia; Venue: Quaycentre; Level: Super 300; Prize: $150,000; Format: 32MS/32WS/32MD/32WD/32XD	(China) Wang Yilyu (China) Huang Dongping	(Indonesia) Praveen Jordan (Indonesia) Melati Daeva Oktavianti
4–9 June	Australian Open (Report): Host: Sydney, Australia; Venue: Quaycentre; Level: Super 300; Prize: $150,000; Format: 32MS/32WS/32MD/32WD/32XD	Score: 21–15, 21–8	

=== July ===
Date	Tournament	Champions	Runners-up
2–7 July	Canada Open (Report): Host: Calgary, Canada; Venue: Markin MacPhail Centre; Level: Super 100; Prize: $75,000; Format: 64MS/32WS/32MD/32WD/32XD	(China) Li Shifeng	(India) Parupalli Kashyap
2–7 July	Canada Open (Report): Host: Calgary, Canada; Venue: Markin MacPhail Centre; Level: Super 100; Prize: $75,000; Format: 64MS/32WS/32MD/32WD/32XD	Score: 20–22, 21–14, 21–17	
2–7 July	Canada Open (Report): Host: Calgary, Canada; Venue: Markin MacPhail Centre; Level: Super 100; Prize: $75,000; Format: 64MS/32WS/32MD/32WD/32XD	(South Korea) An Se-young	(China) Wang Zhiyi
2–7 July	Canada Open (Report): Host: Calgary, Canada; Venue: Markin MacPhail Centre; Level: Super 100; Prize: $75,000; Format: 64MS/32WS/32MD/32WD/32XD	Score: 21–15, 22–20	
2–7 July	Canada Open (Report): Host: Calgary, Canada; Venue: Markin MacPhail Centre; Level: Super 100; Prize: $75,000; Format: 64MS/32WS/32MD/32WD/32XD	(Denmark) Mathias Boe (Denmark) Mads Conrad-Petersen	(Japan) Hiroki Okamura (Japan) Masayuki Onodera
2–7 July	Canada Open (Report): Host: Calgary, Canada; Venue: Markin MacPhail Centre; Level: Super 100; Prize: $75,000; Format: 64MS/32WS/32MD/32WD/32XD	Score: 21–12, 21–18	
2–7 July	Canada Open (Report): Host: Calgary, Canada; Venue: Markin MacPhail Centre; Level: Super 100; Prize: $75,000; Format: 64MS/32WS/32MD/32WD/32XD	(Australia) Setyana Mapasa (Australia) Gronya Somerville	(South Korea) Chang Ye-na (South Korea) Kim Hye-rin
2–7 July	Canada Open (Report): Host: Calgary, Canada; Venue: Markin MacPhail Centre; Level: Super 100; Prize: $75,000; Format: 64MS/32WS/32MD/32WD/32XD	Score: 21–16, 21–14	
2–7 July	Canada Open (Report): Host: Calgary, Canada; Venue: Markin MacPhail Centre; Level: Super 100; Prize: $75,000; Format: 64MS/32WS/32MD/32WD/32XD	(South Korea) Ko Sung-hyun (South Korea) Eom Hye-won	(China) Guo Xinwa (China) Zhang Shuxian
2–7 July	Canada Open (Report): Host: Calgary, Canada; Venue: Markin MacPhail Centre; Level: Super 100; Prize: $75,000; Format: 64MS/32WS/32MD/32WD/32XD	Score: 21–19, 21–19	
9–14 July	U.S. Open (Report): Host: Fullerton, California, United States; Venue: Titan Gym; Level: Super 300; Prize: $150,000; Format: 32MS/32WS/32MD/32WD/32XD	(Chinese Taipei) Lin Chun-yi	(Thailand) Tanongsak Saensomboonsuk
9–14 July	U.S. Open (Report): Host: Fullerton, California, United States; Venue: Titan Gym; Level: Super 300; Prize: $150,000; Format: 32MS/32WS/32MD/32WD/32XD	Score: 21–10, 21–13	
9–14 July	U.S. Open (Report): Host: Fullerton, California, United States; Venue: Titan Gym; Level: Super 300; Prize: $150,000; Format: 32MS/32WS/32MD/32WD/32XD	(China) Wang Zhiyi	(South Korea) Kim Ga-eun
9–14 July	U.S. Open (Report): Host: Fullerton, California, United States; Venue: Titan Gym; Level: Super 300; Prize: $150,000; Format: 32MS/32WS/32MD/32WD/32XD	Score: 21–18, 21–19	
9–14 July	U.S. Open (Report): Host: Fullerton, California, United States; Venue: Titan Gym; Level: Super 300; Prize: $150,000; Format: 32MS/32WS/32MD/32WD/32XD	(South Korea) Ko Sung-hyun (South Korea) Shin Baek-cheol	(Chinese Taipei) Lee Yang (Chinese Taipei) Wang Chi-lin
9–14 July	U.S. Open (Report): Host: Fullerton, California, United States; Venue: Titan Gym; Level: Super 300; Prize: $150,000; Format: 32MS/32WS/32MD/32WD/32XD	Score: 21–13, 17–21, 6–3 Retired	
9–14 July	U.S. Open (Report): Host: Fullerton, California, United States; Venue: Titan Gym; Level: Super 300; Prize: $150,000; Format: 32MS/32WS/32MD/32WD/32XD	(Japan) Nami Matsuyama (Japan) Chiharu Shida	(South Korea) Baek Ha-na (South Korea) Jung Kyung-eun
9–14 July	U.S. Open (Report): Host: Fullerton, California, United States; Venue: Titan Gym; Level: Super 300; Prize: $150,000; Format: 32MS/32WS/32MD/32WD/32XD	Score: 21–16, 21–16	
9–14 July	U.S. Open (Report): Host: Fullerton, California, United States; Venue: Titan Gym; Level: Super 300; Prize: $150,000; Format: 32MS/32WS/32MD/32WD/32XD	(Chinese Taipei) Lee Jhe-huei (Chinese Taipei) Hsu Ya-ching	(France) Thom Gicquel (France) Delphine Delrue
9–14 July	U.S. Open (Report): Host: Fullerton, California, United States; Venue: Titan Gym; Level: Super 300; Prize: $150,000; Format: 32MS/32WS/32MD/32WD/32XD	Score: 21–17, 21–17	
16–21 July	Indonesia Open (Report): Host: Jakarta, Indonesia; Venue: Istora Gelora Bung Karno; Level: Super 1000; Prize: $1,250,000; Format: 32MS/32WS/32MD/32WD/32XD	(Chinese Taipei) Chou Tien-chen	(Denmark) Anders Antonsen
16–21 July	Indonesia Open (Report): Host: Jakarta, Indonesia; Venue: Istora Gelora Bung Karno; Level: Super 1000; Prize: $1,250,000; Format: 32MS/32WS/32MD/32WD/32XD	Score: 21–18, 24–26, 21–15	
16–21 July	Indonesia Open (Report): Host: Jakarta, Indonesia; Venue: Istora Gelora Bung Karno; Level: Super 1000; Prize: $1,250,000; Format: 32MS/32WS/32MD/32WD/32XD	(Japan) Akane Yamaguchi	(India) P. V. Sindhu
16–21 July	Indonesia Open (Report): Host: Jakarta, Indonesia; Venue: Istora Gelora Bung Karno; Level: Super 1000; Prize: $1,250,000; Format: 32MS/32WS/32MD/32WD/32XD	Score: 21–15, 21–16	
16–21 July	Indonesia Open (Report): Host: Jakarta, Indonesia; Venue: Istora Gelora Bung Karno; Level: Super 1000; Prize: $1,250,000; Format: 32MS/32WS/32MD/32WD/32XD	(Indonesia) Marcus Fernaldi Gideon (Indonesia) Kevin Sanjaya Sukamuljo	(Indonesia) Mohammad Ahsan (Indonesia) Hendra Setiawan
16–21 July	Indonesia Open (Report): Host: Jakarta, Indonesia; Venue: Istora Gelora Bung Karno; Level: Super 1000; Prize: $1,250,000; Format: 32MS/32WS/32MD/32WD/32XD	Score: 21–19, 21–16	
16–21 July	Indonesia Open (Report): Host: Jakarta, Indonesia; Venue: Istora Gelora Bung Karno; Level: Super 1000; Prize: $1,250,000; Format: 32MS/32WS/32MD/32WD/32XD	(Japan) Yuki Fukushima (Japan) Sayaka Hirota	(Japan) Misaki Matsutomo (Japan) Ayaka Takahashi
16–21 July	Indonesia Open (Report): Host: Jakarta, Indonesia; Venue: Istora Gelora Bung Karno; Level: Super 1000; Prize: $1,250,000; Format: 32MS/32WS/32MD/32WD/32XD	Score: 21–16, 21–18	
16–21 July	Indonesia Open (Report): Host: Jakarta, Indonesia; Venue: Istora Gelora Bung Karno; Level: Super 1000; Prize: $1,250,000; Format: 32MS/32WS/32MD/32WD/32XD	(China) Zheng Siwei (China) Huang Yaqiong	(China) Wang Yilyu (China) Huang Dongping
16–21 July	Indonesia Open (Report): Host: Jakarta, Indonesia; Venue: Istora Gelora Bung Karno; Level: Super 1000; Prize: $1,250,000; Format: 32MS/32WS/32MD/32WD/32XD	Score: 21–13, 21–18	
16–21 July	Russian Open (Report): Host: Vladivostok, Russia; Venue: Sport Hall Olympic; Level: Super 100; Prize: $75,000; Format: 64MS/32WS/32MD/32WD/32XD	(Indonesia) Shesar Hiren Rhustavito	(Singapore) Loh Kean Yew
16–21 July	Russian Open (Report): Host: Vladivostok, Russia; Venue: Sport Hall Olympic; Level: Super 100; Prize: $75,000; Format: 64MS/32WS/32MD/32WD/32XD	Score: 21–17, 21–19	
16–21 July	Russian Open (Report): Host: Vladivostok, Russia; Venue: Sport Hall Olympic; Level: Super 100; Prize: $75,000; Format: 64MS/32WS/32MD/32WD/32XD	(Chinese Taipei) Pai Yu-po	(Scotland) Kirsty Gilmour
16–21 July	Russian Open (Report): Host: Vladivostok, Russia; Venue: Sport Hall Olympic; Level: Super 100; Prize: $75,000; Format: 64MS/32WS/32MD/32WD/32XD	Score: 9–21, 21–19, 21–19	
16–21 July	Russian Open (Report): Host: Vladivostok, Russia; Venue: Sport Hall Olympic; Level: Super 100; Prize: $75,000; Format: 64MS/32WS/32MD/32WD/32XD	(Denmark) Mathias Boe (Denmark) Mads Conrad-Petersen	(Japan) Keiichiro Matsui (Japan) Yoshinori Takeuchi
16–21 July	Russian Open (Report): Host: Vladivostok, Russia; Venue: Sport Hall Olympic; Level: Super 100; Prize: $75,000; Format: 64MS/32WS/32MD/32WD/32XD	Score: 21–18, 21–13	
16–21 July	Russian Open (Report): Host: Vladivostok, Russia; Venue: Sport Hall Olympic; Level: Super 100; Prize: $75,000; Format: 64MS/32WS/32MD/32WD/32XD	(Indonesia) Ni Ketut Mahadewi Istarani (Indonesia) Tania Oktaviani Kusumah	(Japan) Miki Kashihara (Japan) Miyuki Kato
16–21 July	Russian Open (Report): Host: Vladivostok, Russia; Venue: Sport Hall Olympic; Level: Super 100; Prize: $75,000; Format: 64MS/32WS/32MD/32WD/32XD	Score: 23–21, 21–16	
16–21 July	Russian Open (Report): Host: Vladivostok, Russia; Venue: Sport Hall Olympic; Level: Super 100; Prize: $75,000; Format: 64MS/32WS/32MD/32WD/32XD	(Indonesia) Adnan Maulana (Indonesia) Mychelle Crhystine Bandaso	(Russia) Evgenij Dremin (Russia) Evgenia Dimova
16–21 July	Russian Open (Report): Host: Vladivostok, Russia; Venue: Sport Hall Olympic; Level: Super 100; Prize: $75,000; Format: 64MS/32WS/32MD/32WD/32XD	Score: 19–21, 21–13, 21–15	
23–28 July	Japan Open (Report): Host: Tokyo, Japan; Venue: Musashino Forest Sport Plaza; Level: Super 750; Prize: $700,000; Format: 32MS/32WS/32MD/32WD/32XD	(Japan) Kento Momota	(Indonesia) Jonatan Christie
23–28 July	Japan Open (Report): Host: Tokyo, Japan; Venue: Musashino Forest Sport Plaza; Level: Super 750; Prize: $700,000; Format: 32MS/32WS/32MD/32WD/32XD	Score: 21–16, 21–13	
23–28 July	Japan Open (Report): Host: Tokyo, Japan; Venue: Musashino Forest Sport Plaza; Level: Super 750; Prize: $700,000; Format: 32MS/32WS/32MD/32WD/32XD	(Japan) Akane Yamaguchi	(Japan) Nozomi Okuhara
23–28 July	Japan Open (Report): Host: Tokyo, Japan; Venue: Musashino Forest Sport Plaza; Level: Super 750; Prize: $700,000; Format: 32MS/32WS/32MD/32WD/32XD	Score: 21–13, 21–15	
23–28 July	Japan Open (Report): Host: Tokyo, Japan; Venue: Musashino Forest Sport Plaza; Level: Super 750; Prize: $700,000; Format: 32MS/32WS/32MD/32WD/32XD	(Indonesia) Marcus Fernaldi Gideon (Indonesia) Kevin Sanjaya Sukamuljo	(Indonesia) Mohammad Ahsan (Indonesia) Hendra Setiawan
23–28 July	Japan Open (Report): Host: Tokyo, Japan; Venue: Musashino Forest Sport Plaza; Level: Super 750; Prize: $700,000; Format: 32MS/32WS/32MD/32WD/32XD	Score: 21–18, 23–21	
23–28 July	Japan Open (Report): Host: Tokyo, Japan; Venue: Musashino Forest Sport Plaza; Level: Super 750; Prize: $700,000; Format: 32MS/32WS/32MD/32WD/32XD	(South Korea) Kim So-yeong (South Korea) Kong Hee-yong	(Japan) Mayu Matsumoto (Japan) Wakana Nagahara
23–28 July	Japan Open (Report): Host: Tokyo, Japan; Venue: Musashino Forest Sport Plaza; Level: Super 750; Prize: $700,000; Format: 32MS/32WS/32MD/32WD/32XD	Score: 21–12, 21–12	
23–28 July	Japan Open (Report): Host: Tokyo, Japan; Venue: Musashino Forest Sport Plaza; Level: Super 750; Prize: $700,000; Format: 32MS/32WS/32MD/32WD/32XD	(China) Wang Yilyu (China) Huang Dongping	(Indonesia) Praveen Jordan (Indonesia) Melati Daeva Oktavianti
23–28 July	Japan Open (Report): Host: Tokyo, Japan; Venue: Musashino Forest Sport Plaza; Level: Super 750; Prize: $700,000; Format: 32MS/32WS/32MD/32WD/32XD	Score: 21–17, 21–16	
30 July – 4 August	Thailand Open (Report): Host: Bangkok, Thailand; Venue: Indoor Stadium Huamark; Level: Super 500; Prize: $350,000; Format: 32MS/32WS/32MD/32WD/32XD	(Chinese Taipei) Chou Tien-chen	(Hong Kong) Ng Ka Long
30 July – 4 August	Thailand Open (Report): Host: Bangkok, Thailand; Venue: Indoor Stadium Huamark; Level: Super 500; Prize: $350,000; Format: 32MS/32WS/32MD/32WD/32XD	Score: 21–14, 11–21, 23–21	
30 July – 4 August	Thailand Open (Report): Host: Bangkok, Thailand; Venue: Indoor Stadium Huamark; Level: Super 500; Prize: $350,000; Format: 32MS/32WS/32MD/32WD/32XD	(China) Chen Yufei	(Thailand) Ratchanok Intanon
30 July – 4 August	Thailand Open (Report): Host: Bangkok, Thailand; Venue: Indoor Stadium Huamark; Level: Super 500; Prize: $350,000; Format: 32MS/32WS/32MD/32WD/32XD	Score: 22–20, 21–18	
30 July – 4 August	Thailand Open (Report): Host: Bangkok, Thailand; Venue: Indoor Stadium Huamark; Level: Super 500; Prize: $350,000; Format: 32MS/32WS/32MD/32WD/32XD	(India) Satwiksairaj Rankireddy (India) Chirag Shetty	(China) Li Junhui (China) Liu Yuchen
30 July – 4 August	Thailand Open (Report): Host: Bangkok, Thailand; Venue: Indoor Stadium Huamark; Level: Super 500; Prize: $350,000; Format: 32MS/32WS/32MD/32WD/32XD	Score: 21–19, 18–21, 21–18	
30 July – 4 August	Thailand Open (Report): Host: Bangkok, Thailand; Venue: Indoor Stadium Huamark; Level: Super 500; Prize: $350,000; Format: 32MS/32WS/32MD/32WD/32XD	(Japan) Shiho Tanaka (Japan) Koharu Yonemoto	(China) Du Yue (China) Li Yinhui
30 July – 4 August	Thailand Open (Report): Host: Bangkok, Thailand; Venue: Indoor Stadium Huamark; Level: Super 500; Prize: $350,000; Format: 32MS/32WS/32MD/32WD/32XD	Score: 21–19, 14–21, 21–13	
30 July – 4 August	Thailand Open (Report): Host: Bangkok, Thailand; Venue: Indoor Stadium Huamark; Level: Super 500; Prize: $350,000; Format: 32MS/32WS/32MD/32WD/32XD	(China) Wang Yilyu (China) Huang Dongping	(Japan) Yuta Watanabe (Japan) Arisa Higashino
30 July – 4 August	Thailand Open (Report): Host: Bangkok, Thailand; Venue: Indoor Stadium Huamark; Level: Super 500; Prize: $350,000; Format: 32MS/32WS/32MD/32WD/32XD	Score: 24–22, 23–21	

=== August ===
Date	Tournament	Champions	Runners-up
6–11 August	Hyderabad Open (Report): Host: Hyderabad, India; Venue: G. M. C. Balayogi SATS Indoor Stadium; Level: Super 100; Prize: $75,000; Format: 64MS/32WS/32MD/32WD/32XD	(India) Sourabh Verma	(Singapore) Loh Kean Yew
6–11 August	Hyderabad Open (Report): Host: Hyderabad, India; Venue: G. M. C. Balayogi SATS Indoor Stadium; Level: Super 100; Prize: $75,000; Format: 64MS/32WS/32MD/32WD/32XD	Score: 21–13, 14–21, 21–16	
6–11 August	Hyderabad Open (Report): Host: Hyderabad, India; Venue: G. M. C. Balayogi SATS Indoor Stadium; Level: Super 100; Prize: $75,000; Format: 64MS/32WS/32MD/32WD/32XD	(Singapore) Yeo Jia Min	(South Korea) An Se-young
6–11 August	Hyderabad Open (Report): Host: Hyderabad, India; Venue: G. M. C. Balayogi SATS Indoor Stadium; Level: Super 100; Prize: $75,000; Format: 64MS/32WS/32MD/32WD/32XD	Score: 12–21, 21–17, 21–19	
6–11 August	Hyderabad Open (Report): Host: Hyderabad, India; Venue: G. M. C. Balayogi SATS Indoor Stadium; Level: Super 100; Prize: $75,000; Format: 64MS/32WS/32MD/32WD/32XD	(Indonesia) Muhammad Shohibul Fikri (Indonesia) Bagas Maulana	(South Korea) Na Sung-seung (South Korea) Wang Chan
6–11 August	Hyderabad Open (Report): Host: Hyderabad, India; Venue: G. M. C. Balayogi SATS Indoor Stadium; Level: Super 100; Prize: $75,000; Format: 64MS/32WS/32MD/32WD/32XD	Score: 21–18, 21–18	
6–11 August	Hyderabad Open (Report): Host: Hyderabad, India; Venue: G. M. C. Balayogi SATS Indoor Stadium; Level: Super 100; Prize: $75,000; Format: 64MS/32WS/32MD/32WD/32XD	(South Korea) Baek Ha-na (South Korea) Jung Kyung-eun	(India) Ashwini Ponnappa (India) N. Sikki Reddy
6–11 August	Hyderabad Open (Report): Host: Hyderabad, India; Venue: G. M. C. Balayogi SATS Indoor Stadium; Level: Super 100; Prize: $75,000; Format: 64MS/32WS/32MD/32WD/32XD	Score: 21–17, 21–17	
6–11 August	Hyderabad Open (Report): Host: Hyderabad, India; Venue: G. M. C. Balayogi SATS Indoor Stadium; Level: Super 100; Prize: $75,000; Format: 64MS/32WS/32MD/32WD/32XD	(Malaysia) Hoo Pang Ron (Malaysia) Cheah Yee See	(Indonesia) Adnan Maulana (Indonesia) Mychelle Crhystine Bandaso
6–11 August	Hyderabad Open (Report): Host: Hyderabad, India; Venue: G. M. C. Balayogi SATS Indoor Stadium; Level: Super 100; Prize: $75,000; Format: 64MS/32WS/32MD/32WD/32XD	Score: 16–21, 21–16, 21–11	
13–18 August	Akita Masters (Report): Host: Akita, Akita Prefecture, Japan; Venue: CNA Arena Akita; Level: Super 100; Prize: $75,000; Format: 64MS/32WS/32MD/32WD/32XD	(Indonesia) Firman Abdul Kholik	(Japan) Yu Igarashi
13–18 August	Akita Masters (Report): Host: Akita, Akita Prefecture, Japan; Venue: CNA Arena Akita; Level: Super 100; Prize: $75,000; Format: 64MS/32WS/32MD/32WD/32XD	Score: 21–18, 22–20	
13–18 August	Akita Masters (Report): Host: Akita, Akita Prefecture, Japan; Venue: CNA Arena Akita; Level: Super 100; Prize: $75,000; Format: 64MS/32WS/32MD/32WD/32XD	(South Korea) An Se-young	(Japan) Haruko Suzuki
13–18 August	Akita Masters (Report): Host: Akita, Akita Prefecture, Japan; Venue: CNA Arena Akita; Level: Super 100; Prize: $75,000; Format: 64MS/32WS/32MD/32WD/32XD	Score: 21–10, 17–21, 21–14	
13–18 August	Akita Masters (Report): Host: Akita, Akita Prefecture, Japan; Venue: CNA Arena Akita; Level: Super 100; Prize: $75,000; Format: 64MS/32WS/32MD/32WD/32XD	(China) Ou Xuanyi (China) Zhang Nan	(Japan) Akira Koga (Japan) Taichi Saito
13–18 August	Akita Masters (Report): Host: Akita, Akita Prefecture, Japan; Venue: CNA Arena Akita; Level: Super 100; Prize: $75,000; Format: 64MS/32WS/32MD/32WD/32XD	Score: 21–14, 21–19	
13–18 August	Akita Masters (Report): Host: Akita, Akita Prefecture, Japan; Venue: CNA Arena Akita; Level: Super 100; Prize: $75,000; Format: 64MS/32WS/32MD/32WD/32XD	(Japan) Ayako Sakuramoto (Japan) Yukiko Takahata	(Indonesia) Nita Violina Marwah (Indonesia) Putri Syaikah
13–18 August	Akita Masters (Report): Host: Akita, Akita Prefecture, Japan; Venue: CNA Arena Akita; Level: Super 100; Prize: $75,000; Format: 64MS/32WS/32MD/32WD/32XD	Score: 21–17, 14–21, 21–15	
13–18 August	Akita Masters (Report): Host: Akita, Akita Prefecture, Japan; Venue: CNA Arena Akita; Level: Super 100; Prize: $75,000; Format: 64MS/32WS/32MD/32WD/32XD	(South Korea) Ko Sung-hyun (South Korea) Eom Hye-won	(Japan) Kyohei Yamashita (Japan) Naru Shinoya
13–18 August	Akita Masters (Report): Host: Akita, Akita Prefecture, Japan; Venue: CNA Arena Akita; Level: Super 100; Prize: $75,000; Format: 64MS/32WS/32MD/32WD/32XD	Score: 21–10, 21–17	

=== September ===
Date	Tournament	Champions	Runners-up
3–8 September	Chinese Taipei Open (Report): Host: Taipei, Taiwan; Venue: Taipei Arena; Level: Super 300; Prize: $500,000; Format: 32MS/32WS/32MD/32WD/32XD	(Chinese Taipei) Chou Tien-chen	(South Korea) Heo Kwang-hee
3–8 September	Chinese Taipei Open (Report): Host: Taipei, Taiwan; Venue: Taipei Arena; Level: Super 300; Prize: $500,000; Format: 32MS/32WS/32MD/32WD/32XD	Score: 21–12, 21–13	
3–8 September	Chinese Taipei Open (Report): Host: Taipei, Taiwan; Venue: Taipei Arena; Level: Super 300; Prize: $500,000; Format: 32MS/32WS/32MD/32WD/32XD	(South Korea) Sung Ji-hyun	(Canada) Michelle Li
3–8 September	Chinese Taipei Open (Report): Host: Taipei, Taiwan; Venue: Taipei Arena; Level: Super 300; Prize: $500,000; Format: 32MS/32WS/32MD/32WD/32XD	Score: 21–11, 21–9	
3–8 September	Chinese Taipei Open (Report): Host: Taipei, Taiwan; Venue: Taipei Arena; Level: Super 300; Prize: $500,000; Format: 32MS/32WS/32MD/32WD/32XD	(Malaysia) Goh V Shem (Malaysia) Tan Wee Kiong	(South Korea) Choi Sol-gyu (South Korea) Seo Seung-jae
3–8 September	Chinese Taipei Open (Report): Host: Taipei, Taiwan; Venue: Taipei Arena; Level: Super 300; Prize: $500,000; Format: 32MS/32WS/32MD/32WD/32XD	Score: 21–19, 15–21, 23–21	
3–8 September	Chinese Taipei Open (Report): Host: Taipei, Taiwan; Venue: Taipei Arena; Level: Super 300; Prize: $500,000; Format: 32MS/32WS/32MD/32WD/32XD	(Thailand) Jongkolphan Kititharakul (Thailand) Rawinda Prajongjai	(South Korea) Kim So-yeong (South Korea) Kong Hee-yong
3–8 September	Chinese Taipei Open (Report): Host: Taipei, Taiwan; Venue: Taipei Arena; Level: Super 300; Prize: $500,000; Format: 32MS/32WS/32MD/32WD/32XD	Score: 21–19, 18–21, 28–26	
3–8 September	Chinese Taipei Open (Report): Host: Taipei, Taiwan; Venue: Taipei Arena; Level: Super 300; Prize: $500,000; Format: 32MS/32WS/32MD/32WD/32XD	(Hong Kong) Tang Chun Man (Hong Kong) Tse Ying Suet	(South Korea) Seo Seung-jae (South Korea) Chae Yoo-jung
3–8 September	Chinese Taipei Open (Report): Host: Taipei, Taiwan; Venue: Taipei Arena; Level: Super 300; Prize: $500,000; Format: 32MS/32WS/32MD/32WD/32XD	Score: 21–18, 21–10	
10–15 September	Vietnam Open (Report): Host: Ho Chi Minh City, Vietnam; Venue: Nguyen Du Cultural Sports Club; Level: Super 100; Prize: $75,000; Format: 64MS/32WS/32MD/32WD/32XD	(India) Sourabh Verma	(China) Sun Feixiang
10–15 September	Vietnam Open (Report): Host: Ho Chi Minh City, Vietnam; Venue: Nguyen Du Cultural Sports Club; Level: Super 100; Prize: $75,000; Format: 64MS/32WS/32MD/32WD/32XD	Score: 21–12, 17–21, 21–14	
10–15 September	Vietnam Open (Report): Host: Ho Chi Minh City, Vietnam; Venue: Nguyen Du Cultural Sports Club; Level: Super 100; Prize: $75,000; Format: 64MS/32WS/32MD/32WD/32XD	(China) Zhang Yiman	(Japan) Asuka Takahashi
10–15 September	Vietnam Open (Report): Host: Ho Chi Minh City, Vietnam; Venue: Nguyen Du Cultural Sports Club; Level: Super 100; Prize: $75,000; Format: 64MS/32WS/32MD/32WD/32XD	Score: 21–18, 21–11	
10–15 September	Vietnam Open (Report): Host: Ho Chi Minh City, Vietnam; Venue: Nguyen Du Cultural Sports Club; Level: Super 100; Prize: $75,000; Format: 64MS/32WS/32MD/32WD/32XD	(South Korea) Choi Sol-gyu (South Korea) Seo Seung-jae	(South Korea) Na Sung-seung (South Korea) Wang Chan
10–15 September	Vietnam Open (Report): Host: Ho Chi Minh City, Vietnam; Venue: Nguyen Du Cultural Sports Club; Level: Super 100; Prize: $75,000; Format: 64MS/32WS/32MD/32WD/32XD	Score: 18–21, 21–16, 21–14	
10–15 September	Vietnam Open (Report): Host: Ho Chi Minh City, Vietnam; Venue: Nguyen Du Cultural Sports Club; Level: Super 100; Prize: $75,000; Format: 64MS/32WS/32MD/32WD/32XD	(Indonesia) Della Destiara Haris (Indonesia) Rizki Amelia Pradipta	(China) Huang Jia (China) Zhang Shuxian
10–15 September	Vietnam Open (Report): Host: Ho Chi Minh City, Vietnam; Venue: Nguyen Du Cultural Sports Club; Level: Super 100; Prize: $75,000; Format: 64MS/32WS/32MD/32WD/32XD	Score: 21–18, 21–17	
10–15 September	Vietnam Open (Report): Host: Ho Chi Minh City, Vietnam; Venue: Nguyen Du Cultural Sports Club; Level: Super 100; Prize: $75,000; Format: 64MS/32WS/32MD/32WD/32XD	(China) Guo Xinwa (China) Zhang Shuxian	(Chinese Taipei) Lee Jhe-huei (Chinese Taipei) Hsu Ya-ching
10–15 September	Vietnam Open (Report): Host: Ho Chi Minh City, Vietnam; Venue: Nguyen Du Cultural Sports Club; Level: Super 100; Prize: $75,000; Format: 64MS/32WS/32MD/32WD/32XD	Score: 18–21, 22–20, 21–8	
17–22 September	China Open (Report): Host: Changzhou, China; Venue: Olympic Sports Center Xincheng Gymnasium; Level: Super 1000; Prize: $1,000,000; Format: 32MS/32WS/32MD/32WD/32XD	(Japan) Kento Momota	(Indonesia) Anthony Sinisuka Ginting
17–22 September	China Open (Report): Host: Changzhou, China; Venue: Olympic Sports Center Xincheng Gymnasium; Level: Super 1000; Prize: $1,000,000; Format: 32MS/32WS/32MD/32WD/32XD	Score: 19–21, 21–17, 21–19	
17–22 September	China Open (Report): Host: Changzhou, China; Venue: Olympic Sports Center Xincheng Gymnasium; Level: Super 1000; Prize: $1,000,000; Format: 32MS/32WS/32MD/32WD/32XD	(Spain) Carolina Marín	(Chinese Taipei) Tai Tzu-ying
17–22 September	China Open (Report): Host: Changzhou, China; Venue: Olympic Sports Center Xincheng Gymnasium; Level: Super 1000; Prize: $1,000,000; Format: 32MS/32WS/32MD/32WD/32XD	Score: 14–21, 21–17, 21–18	
17–22 September	China Open (Report): Host: Changzhou, China; Venue: Olympic Sports Center Xincheng Gymnasium; Level: Super 1000; Prize: $1,000,000; Format: 32MS/32WS/32MD/32WD/32XD	(Indonesia) Marcus Fernaldi Gideon (Indonesia) Kevin Sanjaya Sukamuljo	(Indonesia) Mohammad Ahsan (Indonesia) Hendra Setiawan
17–22 September	China Open (Report): Host: Changzhou, China; Venue: Olympic Sports Center Xincheng Gymnasium; Level: Super 1000; Prize: $1,000,000; Format: 32MS/32WS/32MD/32WD/32XD	Score: 21–18, 17–21, 21–15	
17–22 September	China Open (Report): Host: Changzhou, China; Venue: Olympic Sports Center Xincheng Gymnasium; Level: Super 1000; Prize: $1,000,000; Format: 32MS/32WS/32MD/32WD/32XD	(China) Chen Qingchen (China) Jia Yifan	(Japan) Misaki Matsutomo (Japan) Ayaka Takahashi
17–22 September	China Open (Report): Host: Changzhou, China; Venue: Olympic Sports Center Xincheng Gymnasium; Level: Super 1000; Prize: $1,000,000; Format: 32MS/32WS/32MD/32WD/32XD	Score: 21–14, 21–18	
17–22 September	China Open (Report): Host: Changzhou, China; Venue: Olympic Sports Center Xincheng Gymnasium; Level: Super 1000; Prize: $1,000,000; Format: 32MS/32WS/32MD/32WD/32XD	(China) Zheng Siwei (China) Huang Yaqiong	(China) Wang Yilyu (China) Huang Dongping
17–22 September	China Open (Report): Host: Changzhou, China; Venue: Olympic Sports Center Xincheng Gymnasium; Level: Super 1000; Prize: $1,000,000; Format: 32MS/32WS/32MD/32WD/32XD	Score: 21–17, 13–21, 21–16	
24–29 September	Korea Open (Report): Host: Incheon, South Korea; Venue: Incheon Airport Skydome; Level: Super 500; Prize: $400,000; Format: 32MS/32WS/32MD/32WD/32XD	(Japan) Kento Momota	(Chinese Taipei) Chou Tien-chen
24–29 September	Korea Open (Report): Host: Incheon, South Korea; Venue: Incheon Airport Skydome; Level: Super 500; Prize: $400,000; Format: 32MS/32WS/32MD/32WD/32XD	Score: 21–19, 21–17	
24–29 September	Korea Open (Report): Host: Incheon, South Korea; Venue: Incheon Airport Skydome; Level: Super 500; Prize: $400,000; Format: 32MS/32WS/32MD/32WD/32XD	(China) He Bingjiao	(Thailand) Ratchanok Intanon
24–29 September	Korea Open (Report): Host: Incheon, South Korea; Venue: Incheon Airport Skydome; Level: Super 500; Prize: $400,000; Format: 32MS/32WS/32MD/32WD/32XD	Score: 18–21, 24–22, 21–17	
24–29 September	Korea Open (Report): Host: Incheon, South Korea; Venue: Incheon Airport Skydome; Level: Super 500; Prize: $400,000; Format: 32MS/32WS/32MD/32WD/32XD	(Indonesia) Fajar Alfian (Indonesia) Muhammad Rian Ardianto	(Japan) Takeshi Kamura (Japan) Keigo Sonoda
24–29 September	Korea Open (Report): Host: Incheon, South Korea; Venue: Incheon Airport Skydome; Level: Super 500; Prize: $400,000; Format: 32MS/32WS/32MD/32WD/32XD	Score: 21–16, 21–17	
24–29 September	Korea Open (Report): Host: Incheon, South Korea; Venue: Incheon Airport Skydome; Level: Super 500; Prize: $400,000; Format: 32MS/32WS/32MD/32WD/32XD	(South Korea) Kim So-yeong (South Korea) Kong Hee-yong	(South Korea) Lee So-hee (South Korea) Shin Seung-chan
24–29 September	Korea Open (Report): Host: Incheon, South Korea; Venue: Incheon Airport Skydome; Level: Super 500; Prize: $400,000; Format: 32MS/32WS/32MD/32WD/32XD	Score: 13–21, 21–19, 21–17	
24–29 September	Korea Open (Report): Host: Incheon, South Korea; Venue: Incheon Airport Skydome; Level: Super 500; Prize: $400,000; Format: 32MS/32WS/32MD/32WD/32XD	(Thailand) Dechapol Puavaranukroh (Thailand) Sapsiree Taerattanachai	(China) Zheng Siwei (China) Huang Yaqiong
24–29 September	Korea Open (Report): Host: Incheon, South Korea; Venue: Incheon Airport Skydome; Level: Super 500; Prize: $400,000; Format: 32MS/32WS/32MD/32WD/32XD	Score: 21–14, 21–13	

=== October ===
Date	Tournament	Champions	Runners-up
1–6 October	Indonesia Masters Super 100 (Report): Host: Malang, Indonesia; Venue: Ken Arok Sports Hall; Level: Super 100; Prize: $75,000; Format: 64MS/32WS/32MD/32WD/32XD	(China) Sun Feixiang	(Thailand) Tanongsak Saensomboonsuk
1–6 October	Indonesia Masters Super 100 (Report): Host: Malang, Indonesia; Venue: Ken Arok Sports Hall; Level: Super 100; Prize: $75,000; Format: 64MS/32WS/32MD/32WD/32XD	Score: 21–19, 21–14	
1–6 October	Indonesia Masters Super 100 (Report): Host: Malang, Indonesia; Venue: Ken Arok Sports Hall; Level: Super 100; Prize: $75,000; Format: 64MS/32WS/32MD/32WD/32XD	(China) Wang Zhiyi	(Thailand) Porntip Buranaprasertsuk
1–6 October	Indonesia Masters Super 100 (Report): Host: Malang, Indonesia; Venue: Ken Arok Sports Hall; Level: Super 100; Prize: $75,000; Format: 64MS/32WS/32MD/32WD/32XD	Score: 20–22, 21–15, 21–13	
1–6 October	Indonesia Masters Super 100 (Report): Host: Malang, Indonesia; Venue: Ken Arok Sports Hall; Level: Super 100; Prize: $75,000; Format: 64MS/32WS/32MD/32WD/32XD	(China) Ou Xuanyi (China) Zhang Nan	(Japan) Akira Koga (Japan) Taichi Saito
1–6 October	Indonesia Masters Super 100 (Report): Host: Malang, Indonesia; Venue: Ken Arok Sports Hall; Level: Super 100; Prize: $75,000; Format: 64MS/32WS/32MD/32WD/32XD	Score: 11–21, 21–10, 22–20	
1–6 October	Indonesia Masters Super 100 (Report): Host: Malang, Indonesia; Venue: Ken Arok Sports Hall; Level: Super 100; Prize: $75,000; Format: 64MS/32WS/32MD/32WD/32XD	(Indonesia) Siti Fadia Silva Ramadhanti (Indonesia) Ribka Sugiarto	(Indonesia) Della Destiara Haris (Indonesia) Rizki Amelia Pradipta
1–6 October	Indonesia Masters Super 100 (Report): Host: Malang, Indonesia; Venue: Ken Arok Sports Hall; Level: Super 100; Prize: $75,000; Format: 64MS/32WS/32MD/32WD/32XD	Score: 23–21, 21–15	
1–6 October	Indonesia Masters Super 100 (Report): Host: Malang, Indonesia; Venue: Ken Arok Sports Hall; Level: Super 100; Prize: $75,000; Format: 64MS/32WS/32MD/32WD/32XD	(China) Guo Xinwa (China) Zhang Shuxian	(Indonesia) Adnan Maulana (Indonesia) Mychelle Crhystine Bandaso
1–6 October	Indonesia Masters Super 100 (Report): Host: Malang, Indonesia; Venue: Ken Arok Sports Hall; Level: Super 100; Prize: $75,000; Format: 64MS/32WS/32MD/32WD/32XD	Score: 21–18, 16–21, 28–26	
8–13 October	Dutch Open (Report): Host: Almere, Netherlands; Venue: Topsportcentrum Almere; Level: Super 100; Prize: $75,000; Format: 64MS/32WS/32MD/32WD/32XD	(India) Lakshya Sen	(Japan) Yusuke Onodera
8–13 October	Dutch Open (Report): Host: Almere, Netherlands; Venue: Topsportcentrum Almere; Level: Super 100; Prize: $75,000; Format: 64MS/32WS/32MD/32WD/32XD	Score: 15–21, 21–14, 21–15	
8–13 October	Dutch Open (Report): Host: Almere, Netherlands; Venue: Topsportcentrum Almere; Level: Super 100; Prize: $75,000; Format: 64MS/32WS/32MD/32WD/32XD	(China) Wang Zhiyi	(Russia) Evgeniya Kosetskaya
8–13 October	Dutch Open (Report): Host: Almere, Netherlands; Venue: Topsportcentrum Almere; Level: Super 100; Prize: $75,000; Format: 64MS/32WS/32MD/32WD/32XD	Score: 21–14, 21–18	
8–13 October	Dutch Open (Report): Host: Almere, Netherlands; Venue: Topsportcentrum Almere; Level: Super 100; Prize: $75,000; Format: 64MS/32WS/32MD/32WD/32XD	(Russia) Vladimir Ivanov (Russia) Ivan Sozonov	(Germany) Mark Lamsfuß (Germany) Marvin Emil Seidel
8–13 October	Dutch Open (Report): Host: Almere, Netherlands; Venue: Topsportcentrum Almere; Level: Super 100; Prize: $75,000; Format: 64MS/32WS/32MD/32WD/32XD	Score: 21–19, 21–16	
8–13 October	Dutch Open (Report): Host: Almere, Netherlands; Venue: Topsportcentrum Almere; Level: Super 100; Prize: $75,000; Format: 64MS/32WS/32MD/32WD/32XD	(Bulgaria) Gabriela Stoeva (Bulgaria) Stefani Stoeva	(Japan) Rin Iwanaga (Japan) Kie Nakanishi
8–13 October	Dutch Open (Report): Host: Almere, Netherlands; Venue: Topsportcentrum Almere; Level: Super 100; Prize: $75,000; Format: 64MS/32WS/32MD/32WD/32XD	Score: 21–10, 22–20	
8–13 October	Dutch Open (Report): Host: Almere, Netherlands; Venue: Topsportcentrum Almere; Level: Super 100; Prize: $75,000; Format: 64MS/32WS/32MD/32WD/32XD	(Netherlands) Robin Tabeling (Netherlands) Selena Piek	(England) Chris Adcock (England) Gabby Adcock
8–13 October	Dutch Open (Report): Host: Almere, Netherlands; Venue: Topsportcentrum Almere; Level: Super 100; Prize: $75,000; Format: 64MS/32WS/32MD/32WD/32XD	Score: 21–17, 21–13	
15–20 October	Denmark Open (Report): Host: Odense, Denmark; Venue: Odense Idrætshal; Level: Super 750; Prize: $775,000; Format: 32MS/32WS/32MD/32WD/32XD	(Japan) Kento Momota	(China) Chen Long
15–20 October	Denmark Open (Report): Host: Odense, Denmark; Venue: Odense Idrætshal; Level: Super 750; Prize: $775,000; Format: 32MS/32WS/32MD/32WD/32XD	Score: 21–14, 21–12	
15–20 October	Denmark Open (Report): Host: Odense, Denmark; Venue: Odense Idrætshal; Level: Super 750; Prize: $775,000; Format: 32MS/32WS/32MD/32WD/32XD	(Chinese Taipei) Tai Tzu-ying	(Japan) Nozomi Okuhara
15–20 October	Denmark Open (Report): Host: Odense, Denmark; Venue: Odense Idrætshal; Level: Super 750; Prize: $775,000; Format: 32MS/32WS/32MD/32WD/32XD	Score: 21–17, 21–14	
15–20 October	Denmark Open (Report): Host: Odense, Denmark; Venue: Odense Idrætshal; Level: Super 750; Prize: $775,000; Format: 32MS/32WS/32MD/32WD/32XD	(Indonesia) Marcus Fernaldi Gideon (Indonesia) Kevin Sanjaya Sukamuljo	(Indonesia) Mohammad Ahsan (Indonesia) Hendra Setiawan
15–20 October	Denmark Open (Report): Host: Odense, Denmark; Venue: Odense Idrætshal; Level: Super 750; Prize: $775,000; Format: 32MS/32WS/32MD/32WD/32XD	Score: 21–14, 21–13	
15–20 October	Denmark Open (Report): Host: Odense, Denmark; Venue: Odense Idrætshal; Level: Super 750; Prize: $775,000; Format: 32MS/32WS/32MD/32WD/32XD	(South Korea) Baek Ha-na (South Korea) Jung Kyung-eun	(China) Chen Qingchen (China) Jia Yifan
15–20 October	Denmark Open (Report): Host: Odense, Denmark; Venue: Odense Idrætshal; Level: Super 750; Prize: $775,000; Format: 32MS/32WS/32MD/32WD/32XD	Score: 9–21, 21–19, 21–15	
15–20 October	Denmark Open (Report): Host: Odense, Denmark; Venue: Odense Idrætshal; Level: Super 750; Prize: $775,000; Format: 32MS/32WS/32MD/32WD/32XD	(Indonesia) Praveen Jordan (Indonesia) Melati Daeva Oktavianti	(China) Wang Yilyu (China) Huang Dongping
15–20 October	Denmark Open (Report): Host: Odense, Denmark; Venue: Odense Idrætshal; Level: Super 750; Prize: $775,000; Format: 32MS/32WS/32MD/32WD/32XD	Score: 21–18, 18–21, 21–19	
22–27 October	French Open (Report): Host: Paris, France; Venue: Stade Pierre de Coubertin; Level: Super 750; Prize: $750,000; Format: 32MS/32WS/32MD/32WD/32XD	(China) Chen Long	(Indonesia) Jonatan Christie
22–27 October	French Open (Report): Host: Paris, France; Venue: Stade Pierre de Coubertin; Level: Super 750; Prize: $750,000; Format: 32MS/32WS/32MD/32WD/32XD	Score: 21–19, 21–12	
22–27 October	French Open (Report): Host: Paris, France; Venue: Stade Pierre de Coubertin; Level: Super 750; Prize: $750,000; Format: 32MS/32WS/32MD/32WD/32XD	(South Korea) An Se-young	(Spain) Carolina Marín
22–27 October	French Open (Report): Host: Paris, France; Venue: Stade Pierre de Coubertin; Level: Super 750; Prize: $750,000; Format: 32MS/32WS/32MD/32WD/32XD	Score: 16–21, 21–18, 21–5	
22–27 October	French Open (Report): Host: Paris, France; Venue: Stade Pierre de Coubertin; Level: Super 750; Prize: $750,000; Format: 32MS/32WS/32MD/32WD/32XD	(Indonesia) Marcus Fernaldi Gideon (Indonesia) Kevin Sanjaya Sukamuljo	(India) Satwiksairaj Rankireddy (India) Chirag Shetty
22–27 October	French Open (Report): Host: Paris, France; Venue: Stade Pierre de Coubertin; Level: Super 750; Prize: $750,000; Format: 32MS/32WS/32MD/32WD/32XD	Score: 21–18, 21–16	
22–27 October	French Open (Report): Host: Paris, France; Venue: Stade Pierre de Coubertin; Level: Super 750; Prize: $750,000; Format: 32MS/32WS/32MD/32WD/32XD	(South Korea) Lee So-hee (South Korea) Shin Seung-chan	(South Korea) Kim So-yeong (South Korea) Kong Hee-yong
22–27 October	French Open (Report): Host: Paris, France; Venue: Stade Pierre de Coubertin; Level: Super 750; Prize: $750,000; Format: 32MS/32WS/32MD/32WD/32XD	Score: 16–21, 21–19, 21–12	
22–27 October	French Open (Report): Host: Paris, France; Venue: Stade Pierre de Coubertin; Level: Super 750; Prize: $750,000; Format: 32MS/32WS/32MD/32WD/32XD	(Indonesia) Praveen Jordan (Indonesia) Melati Daeva Oktavianti	(China) Zheng Siwei (China) Huang Yaqiong
22–27 October	French Open (Report): Host: Paris, France; Venue: Stade Pierre de Coubertin; Level: Super 750; Prize: $750,000; Format: 32MS/32WS/32MD/32WD/32XD	Score: 22–24, 21–16, 21–12	
29 October – 3 November	Macau Open (Report): Host: Macau; Venue: Tap Seac Multi-sports Pavilion; Level: Super 300; Prize: $150,000; Format: 32MS/32WS/32MD/32WD/32XD	(Thailand) Sitthikom Thammasin	(China) Shi Yuqi
29 October – 3 November	Macau Open (Report): Host: Macau; Venue: Tap Seac Multi-sports Pavilion; Level: Super 300; Prize: $150,000; Format: 32MS/32WS/32MD/32WD/32XD	Score: 12–21, 21–14, 21–7	
29 October – 3 November	Macau Open (Report): Host: Macau; Venue: Tap Seac Multi-sports Pavilion; Level: Super 300; Prize: $150,000; Format: 32MS/32WS/32MD/32WD/32XD	(Canada) Michelle Li	(China) Han Yue
29 October – 3 November	Macau Open (Report): Host: Macau; Venue: Tap Seac Multi-sports Pavilion; Level: Super 300; Prize: $150,000; Format: 32MS/32WS/32MD/32WD/32XD	Score: 21–18, 21–8	
29 October – 3 November	Macau Open (Report): Host: Macau; Venue: Tap Seac Multi-sports Pavilion; Level: Super 300; Prize: $150,000; Format: 32MS/32WS/32MD/32WD/32XD	(China) Li Junhui (China) Liu Yuchen	(China) Huang Kaixiang (China) Liu Cheng
29 October – 3 November	Macau Open (Report): Host: Macau; Venue: Tap Seac Multi-sports Pavilion; Level: Super 300; Prize: $150,000; Format: 32MS/32WS/32MD/32WD/32XD	Score: 21–8, 18–21, 22–20	
29 October – 3 November	Macau Open (Report): Host: Macau; Venue: Tap Seac Multi-sports Pavilion; Level: Super 300; Prize: $150,000; Format: 32MS/32WS/32MD/32WD/32XD	(China) Du Yue (China) Li Yinhui	(Thailand) Jongkolphan Kititharakul (Thailand) Rawinda Prajongjai
29 October – 3 November	Macau Open (Report): Host: Macau; Venue: Tap Seac Multi-sports Pavilion; Level: Super 300; Prize: $150,000; Format: 32MS/32WS/32MD/32WD/32XD	Score: 21–16, 10–21, 21–12	
29 October – 3 November	Macau Open (Report): Host: Macau; Venue: Tap Seac Multi-sports Pavilion; Level: Super 300; Prize: $150,000; Format: 32MS/32WS/32MD/32WD/32XD	(Thailand) Dechapol Puavaranukroh (Thailand) Sapsiree Taerattanachai	(Chinese Taipei) Wang Chi-lin (Chinese Taipei) Cheng Chi-ya
29 October – 3 November	Macau Open (Report): Host: Macau; Venue: Tap Seac Multi-sports Pavilion; Level: Super 300; Prize: $150,000; Format: 32MS/32WS/32MD/32WD/32XD	Score: 21–11, 21–8	
29 October – 3 November	SaarLorLux Open (Report): Host: Saarbrücken, Germany; Venue: Saarlandhalle; Level: Super 100; Prize: $75,000; Format: 64MS/32WS/32MD/32WD/32XD	(India) Lakshya Sen	(China) Weng Hongyang
29 October – 3 November	SaarLorLux Open (Report): Host: Saarbrücken, Germany; Venue: Saarlandhalle; Level: Super 100; Prize: $75,000; Format: 64MS/32WS/32MD/32WD/32XD	Score: 17–21, 21–18, 21–16	
29 October – 3 November	SaarLorLux Open (Report): Host: Saarbrücken, Germany; Venue: Saarlandhalle; Level: Super 100; Prize: $75,000; Format: 64MS/32WS/32MD/32WD/32XD	(China) Li Yun	(Denmark) Line Christophersen
29 October – 3 November	SaarLorLux Open (Report): Host: Saarbrücken, Germany; Venue: Saarlandhalle; Level: Super 100; Prize: $75,000; Format: 64MS/32WS/32MD/32WD/32XD	Score: 21–12, 21–13	
29 October – 3 November	SaarLorLux Open (Report): Host: Saarbrücken, Germany; Venue: Saarlandhalle; Level: Super 100; Prize: $75,000; Format: 64MS/32WS/32MD/32WD/32XD	(China) Di Zijian (China) Wang Chang	(Denmark) Mathias Bay-Smidt (Denmark) Lasse Mølhede
29 October – 3 November	SaarLorLux Open (Report): Host: Saarbrücken, Germany; Venue: Saarlandhalle; Level: Super 100; Prize: $75,000; Format: 64MS/32WS/32MD/32WD/32XD	Score: 21–17, 21–15	
29 October – 3 November	SaarLorLux Open (Report): Host: Saarbrücken, Germany; Venue: Saarlandhalle; Level: Super 100; Prize: $75,000; Format: 64MS/32WS/32MD/32WD/32XD	(China) Liu Xuanxuan (China) Xia Yuting	(England) Chloe Birch (England) Lauren Smith
29 October – 3 November	SaarLorLux Open (Report): Host: Saarbrücken, Germany; Venue: Saarlandhalle; Level: Super 100; Prize: $75,000; Format: 64MS/32WS/32MD/32WD/32XD	Score: 21–16, 21–13	
29 October – 3 November	SaarLorLux Open (Report): Host: Saarbrücken, Germany; Venue: Saarlandhalle; Level: Super 100; Prize: $75,000; Format: 64MS/32WS/32MD/32WD/32XD	(China) Guo Xinwa (China) Zhang Shuxian	(China) Ren Xiangyu (China) Zhou Chaomin
29 October – 3 November	SaarLorLux Open (Report): Host: Saarbrücken, Germany; Venue: Saarlandhalle; Level: Super 100; Prize: $75,000; Format: 64MS/32WS/32MD/32WD/32XD	Score: 21–18, 21–19	

=== November ===
Date	Tournament	Champions	Runners-up
5–10 November	Fuzhou China Open (Report): Host: Fuzhou, China; Venue: Haixia Olympics Sports Center; Level: Super 750; Prize: $700,000; Format: 32MS/32WS/32MD/32WD/32XD	(Japan) Kento Momota	(Chinese Taipei) Chou Tien-chen
5–10 November	Fuzhou China Open (Report): Host: Fuzhou, China; Venue: Haixia Olympics Sports Center; Level: Super 750; Prize: $700,000; Format: 32MS/32WS/32MD/32WD/32XD	Score: 21–15, 17–21, 21–18	
5–10 November	Fuzhou China Open (Report): Host: Fuzhou, China; Venue: Haixia Olympics Sports Center; Level: Super 750; Prize: $700,000; Format: 32MS/32WS/32MD/32WD/32XD	(China) Chen Yufei	(Japan) Nozomi Okuhara
5–10 November	Fuzhou China Open (Report): Host: Fuzhou, China; Venue: Haixia Olympics Sports Center; Level: Super 750; Prize: $700,000; Format: 32MS/32WS/32MD/32WD/32XD	Score: 9–21, 21–12, 21–18	
5–10 November	Fuzhou China Open (Report): Host: Fuzhou, China; Venue: Haixia Olympics Sports Center; Level: Super 750; Prize: $700,000; Format: 32MS/32WS/32MD/32WD/32XD	(Indonesia) Marcus Fernaldi Gideon (Indonesia) Kevin Sanjaya Sukamuljo	(Japan) Takeshi Kamura (Japan) Keigo Sonoda
5–10 November	Fuzhou China Open (Report): Host: Fuzhou, China; Venue: Haixia Olympics Sports Center; Level: Super 750; Prize: $700,000; Format: 32MS/32WS/32MD/32WD/32XD	Score: 21–17, 21–9	
5–10 November	Fuzhou China Open (Report): Host: Fuzhou, China; Venue: Haixia Olympics Sports Center; Level: Super 750; Prize: $700,000; Format: 32MS/32WS/32MD/32WD/32XD	(Japan) Yuki Fukushima (Japan) Sayaka Hirota	(South Korea) Lee So-hee (South Korea) Shin Seung-chan
5–10 November	Fuzhou China Open (Report): Host: Fuzhou, China; Venue: Haixia Olympics Sports Center; Level: Super 750; Prize: $700,000; Format: 32MS/32WS/32MD/32WD/32XD	Score: 21–17, 21–15	
5–10 November	Fuzhou China Open (Report): Host: Fuzhou, China; Venue: Haixia Olympics Sports Center; Level: Super 750; Prize: $700,000; Format: 32MS/32WS/32MD/32WD/32XD	(China) Wang Yilyu (China) Huang Dongping	(China) Zheng Siwei (China) Huang Yaqiong
5–10 November	Fuzhou China Open (Report): Host: Fuzhou, China; Venue: Haixia Olympics Sports Center; Level: Super 750; Prize: $700,000; Format: 32MS/32WS/32MD/32WD/32XD	Score: 21–14, 21–13	
12–17 November	Hong Kong Open (Report): Host: Hong Kong; Venue: Hong Kong Coliseum; Level: Super 500; Prize: $400,000; Format: 32MS/32WS/32MD/32WD/32XD	(Hong Kong) Lee Cheuk Yiu	(Indonesia) Anthony Sinisuka Ginting
12–17 November	Hong Kong Open (Report): Host: Hong Kong; Venue: Hong Kong Coliseum; Level: Super 500; Prize: $400,000; Format: 32MS/32WS/32MD/32WD/32XD	Score: 16–21, 21–10, 22–20	
12–17 November	Hong Kong Open (Report): Host: Hong Kong; Venue: Hong Kong Coliseum; Level: Super 500; Prize: $400,000; Format: 32MS/32WS/32MD/32WD/32XD	(China) Chen Yufei	(Thailand) Ratchanok Intanon
12–17 November	Hong Kong Open (Report): Host: Hong Kong; Venue: Hong Kong Coliseum; Level: Super 500; Prize: $400,000; Format: 32MS/32WS/32MD/32WD/32XD	Score: 21–18, 13–21, 21–13	
12–17 November	Hong Kong Open (Report): Host: Hong Kong; Venue: Hong Kong Coliseum; Level: Super 500; Prize: $400,000; Format: 32MS/32WS/32MD/32WD/32XD	(South Korea) Choi Sol-gyu (South Korea) Seo Seung-jae	(Indonesia) Mohammad Ahsan (Indonesia) Hendra Setiawan
12–17 November	Hong Kong Open (Report): Host: Hong Kong; Venue: Hong Kong Coliseum; Level: Super 500; Prize: $400,000; Format: 32MS/32WS/32MD/32WD/32XD	Score: 13–21, 21–12, 21–13	
12–17 November	Hong Kong Open (Report): Host: Hong Kong; Venue: Hong Kong Coliseum; Level: Super 500; Prize: $400,000; Format: 32MS/32WS/32MD/32WD/32XD	(China) Chen Qingchen (China) Jia Yifan	(South Korea) Chang Ye-na (South Korea) Kim Hye-rin
12–17 November	Hong Kong Open (Report): Host: Hong Kong; Venue: Hong Kong Coliseum; Level: Super 500; Prize: $400,000; Format: 32MS/32WS/32MD/32WD/32XD	Score: 21–11, 13–21, 21–15	
12–17 November	Hong Kong Open (Report): Host: Hong Kong; Venue: Hong Kong Coliseum; Level: Super 500; Prize: $400,000; Format: 32MS/32WS/32MD/32WD/32XD	(Japan) Yuta Watanabe (Japan) Arisa Higashino	(China) He Jiting (China) Du Yue
12–17 November	Hong Kong Open (Report): Host: Hong Kong; Venue: Hong Kong Coliseum; Level: Super 500; Prize: $400,000; Format: 32MS/32WS/32MD/32WD/32XD	Score: 22–20, 21–16	
19–24 November	Korea Masters (Report): Host: Gwangju, South Korea; Venue: Gwangju Women’s University Stadium; Level: Super 300; Prize: $250,000; Format: 32MS/32WS/32MD/32WD/32XD	(Japan) Kanta Tsuneyama	(China) Lin Dan
19–24 November	Korea Masters (Report): Host: Gwangju, South Korea; Venue: Gwangju Women’s University Stadium; Level: Super 300; Prize: $250,000; Format: 32MS/32WS/32MD/32WD/32XD	Score: 24–22, 21–12	
19–24 November	Korea Masters (Report): Host: Gwangju, South Korea; Venue: Gwangju Women’s University Stadium; Level: Super 300; Prize: $250,000; Format: 32MS/32WS/32MD/32WD/32XD	(South Korea) An Se-young	(South Korea) Sung Ji-hyun
19–24 November	Korea Masters (Report): Host: Gwangju, South Korea; Venue: Gwangju Women’s University Stadium; Level: Super 300; Prize: $250,000; Format: 32MS/32WS/32MD/32WD/32XD	Score: 21–13, 21–17	
19–24 November	Korea Masters (Report): Host: Gwangju, South Korea; Venue: Gwangju Women’s University Stadium; Level: Super 300; Prize: $250,000; Format: 32MS/32WS/32MD/32WD/32XD	(Chinese Taipei) Lee Yang (Chinese Taipei) Wang Chi-lin	(Malaysia) Goh V Shem (Malaysia) Tan Wee Kiong
19–24 November	Korea Masters (Report): Host: Gwangju, South Korea; Venue: Gwangju Women’s University Stadium; Level: Super 300; Prize: $250,000; Format: 32MS/32WS/32MD/32WD/32XD	Score: 21–19, 20–22, 21–19	
19–24 November	Korea Masters (Report): Host: Gwangju, South Korea; Venue: Gwangju Women’s University Stadium; Level: Super 300; Prize: $250,000; Format: 32MS/32WS/32MD/32WD/32XD	(Japan) Nami Matsuyama (Japan) Chiharu Shida	(Japan) Misaki Matsutomo (Japan) Ayaka Takahashi
19–24 November	Korea Masters (Report): Host: Gwangju, South Korea; Venue: Gwangju Women’s University Stadium; Level: Super 300; Prize: $250,000; Format: 32MS/32WS/32MD/32WD/32XD	Score: 15–21, 21–17, 21–18	
19–24 November	Korea Masters (Report): Host: Gwangju, South Korea; Venue: Gwangju Women’s University Stadium; Level: Super 300; Prize: $250,000; Format: 32MS/32WS/32MD/32WD/32XD	(Hong Kong) Tang Chun Man (Hong Kong) Tse Ying Suet	(Malaysia) Goh Soon Huat (Malaysia) Shevon Jemie Lai
19–24 November	Korea Masters (Report): Host: Gwangju, South Korea; Venue: Gwangju Women’s University Stadium; Level: Super 300; Prize: $250,000; Format: 32MS/32WS/32MD/32WD/32XD	Score: 21–14, 21–15	
26 November – 1 December	Syed Modi International (Report): Host: Lucknow, India; Venue: Babu Banarasi Das Indoor Stadium; Level: Super 300; Prize: $150,000; Format: 32MS/32WS/32MD/32WD/32XD	(Chinese Taipei) Wang Tzu-wei	(India) Sourabh Verma
26 November – 1 December	Syed Modi International (Report): Host: Lucknow, India; Venue: Babu Banarasi Das Indoor Stadium; Level: Super 300; Prize: $150,000; Format: 32MS/32WS/32MD/32WD/32XD	Score: 21–15, 21–17	
26 November – 1 December	Syed Modi International (Report): Host: Lucknow, India; Venue: Babu Banarasi Das Indoor Stadium; Level: Super 300; Prize: $150,000; Format: 32MS/32WS/32MD/32WD/32XD	(Spain) Carolina Marín	(Thailand) Phittayaporn Chaiwan
26 November – 1 December	Syed Modi International (Report): Host: Lucknow, India; Venue: Babu Banarasi Das Indoor Stadium; Level: Super 300; Prize: $150,000; Format: 32MS/32WS/32MD/32WD/32XD	Score: 21–12, 21–16	
26 November – 1 December	Syed Modi International (Report): Host: Lucknow, India; Venue: Babu Banarasi Das Indoor Stadium; Level: Super 300; Prize: $150,000; Format: 32MS/32WS/32MD/32WD/32XD	(China) He Jiting (China) Tan Qiang	(South Korea) Choi Sol-gyu (South Korea) Seo Seung-jae
26 November – 1 December	Syed Modi International (Report): Host: Lucknow, India; Venue: Babu Banarasi Das Indoor Stadium; Level: Super 300; Prize: $150,000; Format: 32MS/32WS/32MD/32WD/32XD	Score: 21–18, 21–19	
26 November – 1 December	Syed Modi International (Report): Host: Lucknow, India; Venue: Babu Banarasi Das Indoor Stadium; Level: Super 300; Prize: $150,000; Format: 32MS/32WS/32MD/32WD/32XD	(South Korea) Baek Ha-na (South Korea) Jung Kyung-eun	(South Korea) Chang Ye-na (South Korea) Kim Hye-rin
26 November – 1 December	Syed Modi International (Report): Host: Lucknow, India; Venue: Babu Banarasi Das Indoor Stadium; Level: Super 300; Prize: $150,000; Format: 32MS/32WS/32MD/32WD/32XD	Score: 23–21, 21–15	
26 November – 1 December	Syed Modi International (Report): Host: Lucknow, India; Venue: Babu Banarasi Das Indoor Stadium; Level: Super 300; Prize: $150,000; Format: 32MS/32WS/32MD/32WD/32XD	(Russia) Rodion Alimov (Russia) Alina Davletova	(England) Marcus Ellis (England) Lauren Smith
26 November – 1 December	Syed Modi International (Report): Host: Lucknow, India; Venue: Babu Banarasi Das Indoor Stadium; Level: Super 300; Prize: $150,000; Format: 32MS/32WS/32MD/32WD/32XD	Score: 21–18, 21–16	

=== December ===
Date	Tournament	Champions	Runners-up
11–15 December	BWF World Tour Finals (Report): Host: Guangzhou, China; Venue: Tianhe Gymnasium; Level: World Tour Finals; Prize: $1,500,000	(Japan) Kento Momota	(Indonesia) Anthony Sinisuka Ginting
11–15 December	BWF World Tour Finals (Report): Host: Guangzhou, China; Venue: Tianhe Gymnasium; Level: World Tour Finals; Prize: $1,500,000	Score: 17–21, 21–17, 21–14	
11–15 December	BWF World Tour Finals (Report): Host: Guangzhou, China; Venue: Tianhe Gymnasium; Level: World Tour Finals; Prize: $1,500,000	(China) Chen Yufei	(Chinese Taipei) Tai Tzu-ying
11–15 December	BWF World Tour Finals (Report): Host: Guangzhou, China; Venue: Tianhe Gymnasium; Level: World Tour Finals; Prize: $1,500,000	Score: 12–21, 21–12, 21–17	
11–15 December	BWF World Tour Finals (Report): Host: Guangzhou, China; Venue: Tianhe Gymnasium; Level: World Tour Finals; Prize: $1,500,000	(Indonesia) Mohammad Ahsan (Indonesia) Hendra Setiawan	(Japan) Hiroyuki Endo (Japan) Yuta Watanabe
11–15 December	BWF World Tour Finals (Report): Host: Guangzhou, China; Venue: Tianhe Gymnasium; Level: World Tour Finals; Prize: $1,500,000	Score: 24–22, 21–19	
11–15 December	BWF World Tour Finals (Report): Host: Guangzhou, China; Venue: Tianhe Gymnasium; Level: World Tour Finals; Prize: $1,500,000	(China) Chen Qingchen (China) Jia Yifan	(Japan) Mayu Matsumoto (Japan) Wakana Nagahara
11–15 December	BWF World Tour Finals (Report): Host: Guangzhou, China; Venue: Tianhe Gymnasium; Level: World Tour Finals; Prize: $1,500,000	Score: 21–14, 21–10	
11–15 December	BWF World Tour Finals (Report): Host: Guangzhou, China; Venue: Tianhe Gymnasium; Level: World Tour Finals; Prize: $1,500,000	(China) Zheng Siwei (China) Huang Yaqiong	(China) Wang Yilyu (China) Huang Dongping
11–15 December	BWF World Tour Finals (Report): Host: Guangzhou, China; Venue: Tianhe Gymnasium; Level: World Tour Finals; Prize: $1,500,000	Score: 21–14, 21–14	

== Statistics ==
=== Performance by countries ===
Below are the 2019 BWF World Tour performances by countries. Only countries who have won a title are listed:

BWF World Tour

Rank	Team	BWTF	Super 1000			Super 750					Super 500							Super 300											Total
Rank	Team	CHN	ENG	INA	CHN	MAS	JPN	DEN	FRA	CHN	MAS	INA	IND	SGP	THA	KOR	HKG	THA	ESP	GER	SUI	NZL	AUS	USA	TPE	MAC	KOR	IND	Total
1	China	3	3	1	2	4	1		1	2		1	1		2	1	2			1	2		2	1		2		1	33
2	Japan	1	1	2	1		2	1		2	2	1		3	1	1	1			3			1	1			2		26
3	Indonesia	1	1	1	1		1	2	2	1	1	1	1			1		1			1	2	1						19
4	South Korea						1	1	2		1					1	1		2	1	1	2	1	1	1		1	1	18
5	Chinese Taipei			1		1		1					1	1	1				1					2	1		1	1	12
6	Thailand										1		1	1		1		1							1	2			8
7	Denmark											1	1						2		1								5
8	Malaysia																	2				1			1				4
9	Hong Kong																1								1		1		3
10	Spain				1																							1	2
11	India											1			1														2
12	Canada																									1			1
12	Russia																											1	1
12	Singapore																	1											1

BWF Tour Super 100

Rank	Team	CHN	FRA	CAN	RUS	IND	JPN	VIE	INA	NED	GER	Total
1	China	1		1			1	2	4	1	4	14
2	South Korea	2		2		1	2	1				8
3	Indonesia				3	1	1	1	1			7
4	India					1		1		1	1	4
5	Chinese Taipei	1	1		1							3
5	Japan		2				1					3
7	Denmark			1	1							2
8	Australia			1								1
8	Bulgaria									1		1
8	England		1									1
8	France		1									1
8	Hong Kong	1										1
8	Malaysia					1						1
8	Netherlands									1		1
8	Russia									1		1
8	Singapore					1						1

=== Performance by categories ===
Accurate as of the MD final (5/5 matches) of the BWF World Tour Finals.

==== Men's singles ====
Rank	Players	BWTF	1000	750	500	300	100	Total
1	(Japan) Kento Momota	1	2	3	2	1		9
2	(Chinese Taipei) Chou Tien-chen		1		1	1		3
3	(Denmark) Viktor Axelsen				1	1		2
4	(Indonesia) Jonatan Christie					2		2
5	(India) Lakshya Sen						2	2
5	(India) Sourabh Verma						2	2
7	(China) Chen Long			1				1
7	(China) Lin Dan			1				1
9	(Denmark) Anders Antonsen				1			1
9	(Hong Kong) Lee Cheuk Yiu				1			1
9	(South Korea) Son Wan-ho				1			1
12	(China) Shi Yuqi					1		1
12	(Chinese Taipei) Lin Chun-yi					1		1
12	(Chinese Taipei) Wang Tzu-wei					1		1
12	(Japan) Kanta Tsuneyama					1		1
12	(Singapore) Loh Kean Yew					1		1
12	(Thailand) Sitthikom Thammasin					1		1
18	(China) Li Shifeng						1	1
18	(China) Sun Feixiang						1	1
18	(China) Weng Hongyang						1	1
18	(Indonesia) Firman Abdul Kholik						1	1
18	(Indonesia) Shesar Hiren Rhustavito						1	1
18	(Japan) Koki Watanabe						1	1

==== Women's singles ====
Rank	Players	BWTF	1000	750	500	300	100	Total
1	(China) Chen Yufei	1	1	1	2	2		7
2	(South Korea) An Se-young			1		2	2	5
3	(Japan) Akane Yamaguchi		1	1		1		3
4	(Chinese Taipei) Tai Tzu-ying			2	1			3
5	(China) Wang Zhiyi					1	2	3
6	(Spain) Carolina Marín		1			1		2
7	(Thailand) Ratchanok Intanon				2			2
8	(China) He Bingjiao				1			1
8	(India) Saina Nehwal				1			1
10	(Canada) Michelle Li					1		1
10	(Denmark) Mia Blichfeldt					1		1
10	(Indonesia) Fitriani					1		1
10	(South Korea) Sung Ji-hyun					1		1
14	(China) Li Yun						1	1
14	(China) Zhang Yiman						1	1
14	(Chinese Taipei) Pai Yu-po						1	1
14	(Japan) Saena Kawakami						1	1
14	(Singapore) Yeo Jia Min						1	1
14	(South Korea) Kim Ga-eun						1	1

==== Men's doubles ====
Rank	Players	BWTF	1000	750	500	300	100	Total
1	(Indonesia) Marcus Fernaldi Gideon		2	4	2			8
1	(Indonesia) Kevin Sanjaya Sukamuljo		2	4	2			8
3	(Chinese Taipei) Lee Yang				1	2	1	4
3	(Chinese Taipei) Wang Chi-lin				1	2	1	4
5	(Indonesia) Mohammad Ahsan	1	1			1		3
5	(Indonesia) Hendra Setiawan	1	1			1		3
7	(China) Li Junhui			1		1		2
7	(China) Liu Yuchen			1		1		2
9	(Indonesia) Fajar Alfian				1	1		2
9	(Indonesia) Muhammad Rian Ardianto				1	1		2
11	(South Korea) Choi Sol-gyu				1		1	2
11	(South Korea) Seo Seung-jae				1		1	2
13	(Malaysia) Goh V Shem					2		2
13	(Malaysia) Tan Wee Kiong					2		2
13	(South Korea) Ko Sung-hyun					2		2
13	(South Korea) Shin Baek-cheol					2		2
17	(China) Ou Xuanyi						2	2
17	(China) Zhang Nan						2	2
17	(Denmark) Mathias Boe						2	2
17	(Denmark) Mads Conrad-Petersen						2	2
21	(India) Satwiksairaj Rankireddy				1			1
21	(India) Chirag Shetty				1			1
21	(Japan) Takeshi Kamura				1			1
21	(Japan) Keigo Sonoda				1			1
25	(China) He Jiting					1		1
25	(China) Tan Qiang					1		1
25	(Japan) Hiroyuki Endo					1		1
25	(Japan) Yuta Watanabe					1		1
29	(China) Di Zijian						1	1
29	(China) Wang Chang						1	1
29	(Chinese Taipei) Lee Jhe-huei						1	1
29	(Chinese Taipei) Yang Po-hsuan						1	1
29	(Indonesia) Muhammad Shohibul Fikri						1	1
29	(Indonesia) Bagas Maulana						1	1
29	(Russia) Vladimir Ivanov						1	1
29	(Russia) Ivan Sozonov						1	1

==== Women's doubles ====
Rank	Players	BWTF	1000	750	500	300	100	Total
1	(China) Chen Qingchen	1	2	1	1			5
1	(China) Jia Yifan	1	2	1	1			5
3	(Japan) Yuki Fukushima		1	1	1	1		4
3	(Japan) Sayaka Hirota		1	1	1	1		4
5	(South Korea) Kim So-yeong			1	1	2		4
5	(South Korea) Kong Hee-yong			1	1	2		4
7	(South Korea) Jung Kyung-eun			1		2	1	4
8	(South Korea) Baek Ha-na			1		1	2	4
9	(China) Du Yue					2		2
9	(China) Li Yinhui					2		2
9	(Japan) Nami Matsuyama					2		2
9	(Japan) Chiharu Shida					2		2
13	(South Korea) Lee So-hee			1				1
13	(South Korea) Shin Seung-chan			1				1
15	(Indonesia) Greysia Polii				1			1
15	(Indonesia) Apriyani Rahayu				1			1
15	(Japan) Mayu Matsumoto				1			1
15	(Japan) Misaki Matsutomo				1			1
15	(Japan) Wakana Nagahara				1			1
15	(Japan) Ayaka Takahashi				1			1
15	(Japan) Shiho Tanaka				1			1
15	(Japan) Koharu Yonemoto				1			1
23	(South Korea) Chang Ye-na					1		1
23	(Thailand) Jongkolphan Kititharakul					1		1
23	(Thailand) Rawinda Prajongjai					1		1
23	(Thailand) Puttita Supajirakul					1		1
23	(Thailand) Sapsiree Taerattanachai					1		1
28	(Australia) Setyana Mapasa						1	1
28	(Australia) Gronya Somerville						1	1
28	(Bulgaria) Gabriela Stoeva						1	1
28	(Bulgaria) Stefani Stoeva						1	1
28	(China) Liu Xuanxuan						1	1
28	(China) Xia Yuting						1	1
28	(England) Chloe Birch						1	1
28	(England) Lauren Smith						1	1
28	(Indonesia) Della Destiara Haris						1	1
28	(Indonesia) Ni Ketut Mahadewi Istirani						1	1
28	(Indonesia) Tania Oktaviani Kusumah						1	1
28	(Indonesia) Rizki Amelia Pradipta						1	1
28	(Indonesia) Siti Fadia Silva Ramadhanti						1	1
28	(Indonesia) Ribka Sugiarto						1	1
28	(Japan) Ayako Sakuramoto						1	1
28	(Japan) Yukiko Takahata						1	1
28	(South Korea) Kim Hye-rin						1	1

==== Mixed doubles ====
Rank	Players	BWTF	1000	750	500	300	100	Total
1	(China) Zheng Siwei	1	3	1	1			6
1	(China) Huang Yaqiong	1	3	1	1			6
3	(China) Wang Yilyu			2	2	1		5
3	(China) Huang Dongping			2	2	1		5
5	(Thailand) Dechapol Puavaranukroh				2	1		3
5	(Thailand) Sapsiree Taerattanachai				2	1		3
7	(Hong Kong) Tang Chun Man					2	1	3
8	(China) Guo Xinwa						3	3
8	(China) Zhang Shuxian						3	3
10	(Indonesia) Praveen Jordan			2				2
10	(Indonesia) Melati Daeva Oktavianti			2				2
12	(Japan) Yuta Watanabe				2			2
12	(Japan) Arisa Higashino				2			2
14	(Hong Kong) Tse Ying Suet					2		2
14	(Malaysia) Chan Peng Soon					2		2
14	(Malaysia) Goh Liu Ying					2		2
14	(South Korea) Seo Seung-jae					2		2
14	(South Korea) Chae Yoo-jung					2		2
19	(South Korea) Ko Sung-hyun						2	2
19	(South Korea) Eom Hye-won						2	2
21	(Chinese Taipei) Lee Jhe-huei					1		1
21	(Chinese Taipei) Hsu Ya-ching					1		1
21	(Denmark) Mathias Bay-Smidt					1		1
21	(Denmark) Rikke Søby Hansen					1		1
21	(Russia) Rodion Alimov					1		1
21	(Russia) Alina Davletova					1		1
27	(France) Thom Gicquel						1	1
27	(France) Delphine Delrue						1	1
27	(Hong Kong) Ng Tsz Yau						1	1
27	(Indonesia) Adnan Maulana						1	1
27	(Indonesia) Mychelle Crhystine Bandaso						1	1
27	(Malaysia) Hoo Pang Ron						1	1
27	(Malaysia) Cheah Yee See						1	1
27	(Netherlands) Robin Tabeling						1	1
27	(Netherlands) Selena Piek						1	1

== World Tour Finals rankings ==
The points are calculated from the following levels:

- BWF World Tour Super 1000,
- BWF World Tour Super 750,
- BWF World Tour Super 500,
- BWF World Tour Super 300 (except Syed Modi International),
- BWF Tour Super 100.

This table were calculated after Korea Masters.

=== Men's singles ===
Rankings (Men's singles) as of 26 November 2019
#			Player	Points
1	Steady	(Japan)	Kento Momota	107,590
2	Steady	(Chinese Taipei)	Chou Tien-chen	95,780
3	Steady	(Indonesia)	Jonatan Christie	94,440
4	Steady	(China)	Chen Long	85,140
5	Steady	(Denmark)	Viktor Axelsen	84,800
6	Steady	(Indonesia)	Anthony Sinisuka Ginting	83,710
7	Steady	(Denmark)	Anders Antonsen	80,000
8	Steady	(Chinese Taipei)	Wang Tzu-wei	75,240

=== Women's singles ===
Rankings (Women's singles) as of 26 November 2019
#			Player	Points
1	Steady	(China)	Chen Yufei	106,760
2	Steady	(Thailand)	Ratchanok Intanon	104,060
3	▲2	(Japan)	Akane Yamaguchi	94,450
4	▼1	(Japan)	Nozomi Okuhara	94,060
5	▼1	(Chinese Taipei)	Tai Tzu-ying	92,910
6	Steady	(China)	He Bingjiao	82,980
7	▲1	(Thailand)	Busanan Ongbamrungphan	79,230
8	▼1	(Canada)	Michelle Li	77,040

=== Men's doubles ===
Rankings (Men's doubles) as of 26 November 2019
#			Player	Points
1	Steady	(Indonesia)	Marcus Fernaldi Gideon	116,990
1	Steady	(Indonesia)	Kevin Sanjaya Sukamuljo	116,990
2	Steady	(Indonesia)	Mohammad Ahsan	111,440
2	Steady	(Indonesia)	Hendra Setiawan	111,440
3	Steady	(Japan)	Takeshi Kamura	108,270
3	Steady	(Japan)	Keigo Sonoda	108,270
4	▲1	(Chinese Taipei)	Lee Yang	102,030
4	▲1	(Chinese Taipei)	Wang Chi-lin	102,030
5	▼1	(China)	Li Junhui	100,650
5	▼1	(China)	Liu Yuchen	100,650
6	Steady	(Indonesia)	Fajar Alfian	93,160
6	Steady	(Indonesia)	Muhammad Rian Ardianto	93,160
7	Steady	(Japan)	Hiroyuki Endo	89,520
7	Steady	(Japan)	Yuta Watanabe	89,520
8	Steady	(Chinese Taipei)	Lu Ching-yao	86,130
8	Steady	(Chinese Taipei)	Yang Po-han	86,130

=== Women's doubles ===
Rankings (Women's doubles) as of 26 November 2019
#			Player	Points
1	Steady	(Japan)	Yuki Fukushima	112,740
1	Steady	(Japan)	Sayaka Hirota	112,740
2	Steady	(Japan)	Mayu Matsumoto	109,800
2	Steady	(Japan)	Wakana Nagahara	109,800
3	▲1	(South Korea)	Kim So-yeong	106,470
3	▲1	(South Korea)	Kong Hee-yong	106,470
4	▲1	(Japan)	Misaki Matsutomo	103,810
4	▲1	(Japan)	Ayaka Takahashi	103,810
5	▼2	(China)	Chen Qingchen	103,750
5	▼2	(China)	Jia Yifan	103,750
6	Steady	(Indonesia)	Greysia Polii	85,380
6	Steady	(Indonesia)	Apriyani Rahayu	85,380
7	▲1	(China)	Du Yue	83,760
7	▲1	(China)	Li Yinhui	83,760
8	▲1	(South Korea)	Lee So-hee	82,380
8	▲1	(South Korea)	Shin Seung-chan	82,380

=== Mixed doubles ===
Rankings (Mixed doubles) as of 26 November 2019
#			Player	Points
1	Steady	(Thailand)	Dechapol Puavaranukroh	101,910
1	Steady	(Thailand)	Sapsiree Taerattanachai	101,910
2	Steady	(China)	Zheng Siwei	101,220
2	Steady	(China)	Huang Yaqiong	101,220
3	Steady	(Indonesia)	Praveen Jordan	100,310
3	Steady	(Indonesia)	Melati Daeva Oktavianti	100,310
4	Steady	(China)	Wang Yilyu	98,920
4	Steady	(China)	Huang Dongping	98,920
5	Steady	(Malaysia)	Chan Peng Soon	96,850
5	Steady	(Malaysia)	Goh Liu Ying	96,850
6	Steady	(Japan)	Yuta Watanabe	95,200
6	Steady	(Japan)	Arisa Higashino	95,200
7	Steady	(Indonesia)	Hafiz Faizal	91,230
7	Steady	(Indonesia)	Gloria Emanuelle Widjaja	91,230
8	Steady	(South Korea)	Seo Seung-jae	87,540
8	Steady	(South Korea)	Chae Yoo-jung	87,540
