= Sancai, Hainan =

Sancai 三才镇
- Town
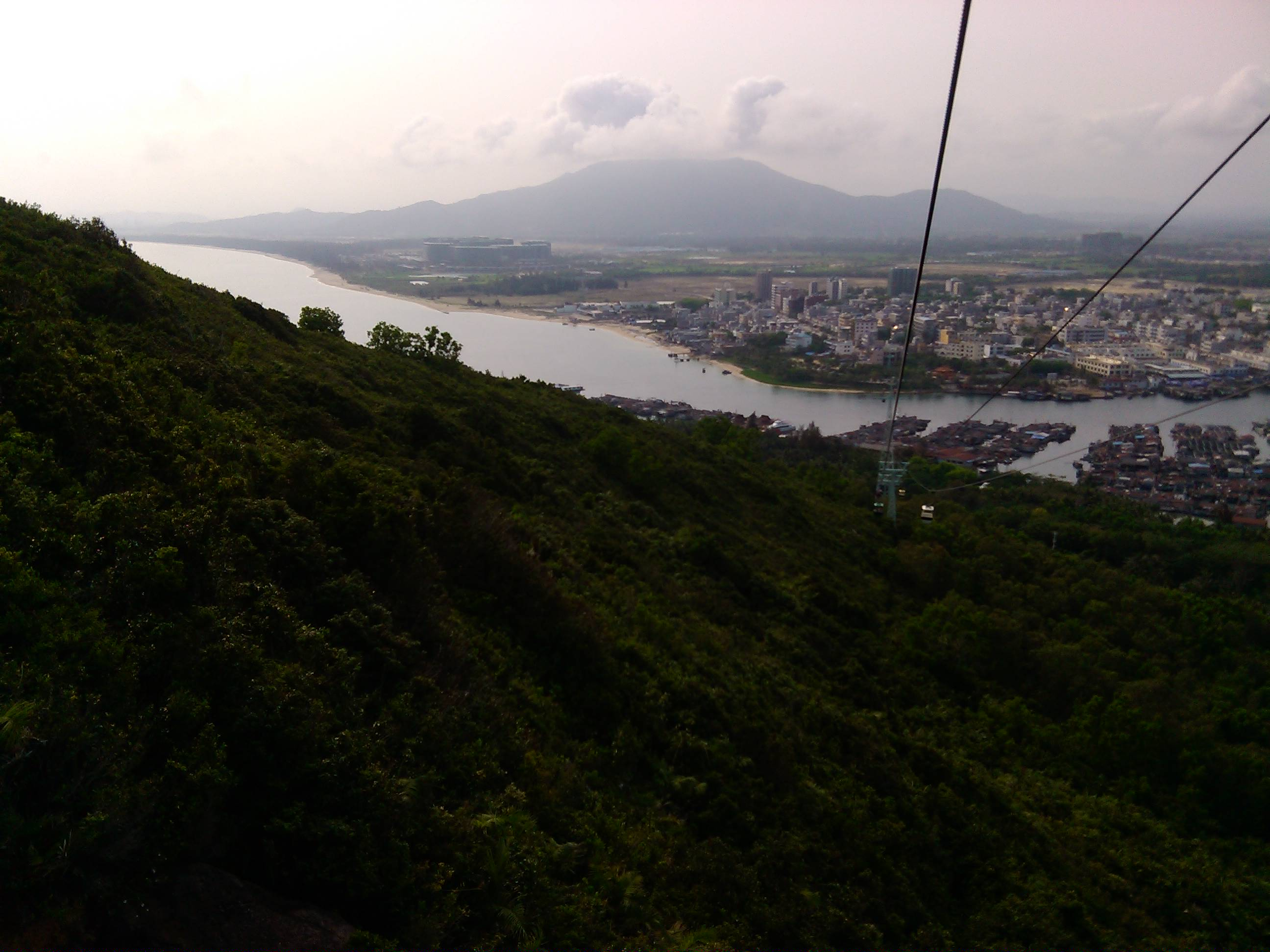

- Location in Hainan
- Coordinates: 18°28′29″N 110°0′9″E
- Country: People's Republic of China
- Province: Hainan
- Autonomous county: Lingshui Li Autonomous County
- Time zone: UTC+8 (China Standard)

Sancai (Chinese: 三才; pinyin: Sāncái) is a town under the administration of Lingshui Li Autonomous County, Hainan, China. As of 2023, it administers six villages: Dayuan Village (大园村), Le'an Village (乐安村), Niudui Village (牛堆村), Huashi Village (花石村), Chaomei Village (朝美村), and Gangyan Village (港演村).
