= Hainan R&F Ocean Paradise =

Theme park in Lingshui, China

Hainan Ocean Paradise 富力海洋欢乐世界
- Interactive map of Hainan Ocean Paradise 富力海洋欢乐世界
- Location: Lingshui County, Hainan Province, China
- Coordinates: 18.483°N 110.081°E

Hainan Ocean Paradise (Chinese: 富力海洋欢乐世界) is a marine life theme park that opened 22 December 2021 in Lingshui County, Hainan Province, China.
