= Lingshui Li Autonomous County =

Lingshui 陵水县
- Autonomous County
- 陵水黎族自治县; Lingshui Li Autonomous County
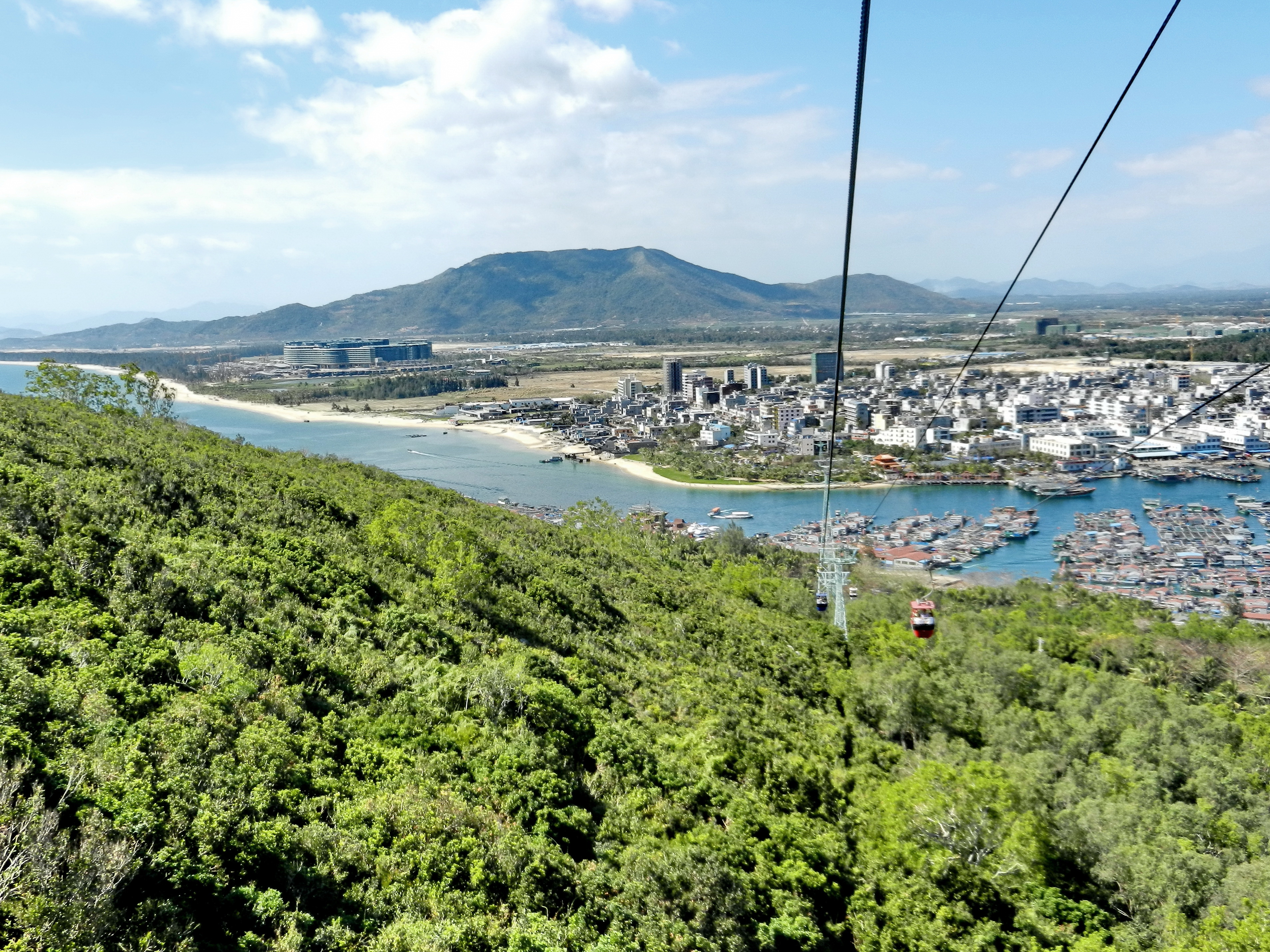

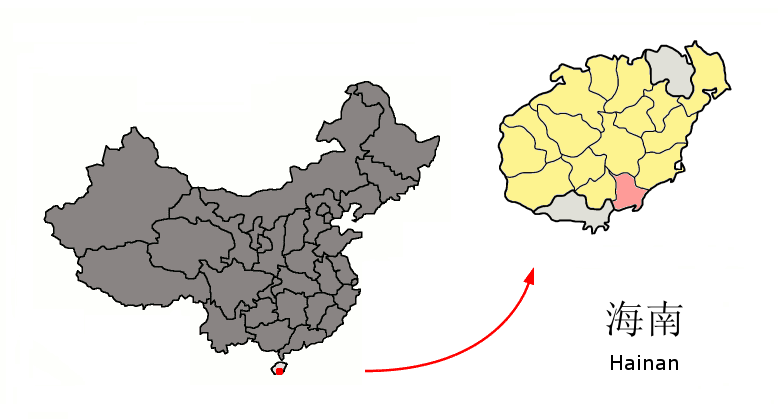
- Location in Hainan

- Location of the seat in Hainan
- Coordinates: 18°30′22″N 110°02′15″E
- Country: People's Republic of China
- Province: Hainan
- County Seat: Yelin Town

Area
  - Total: 1,128 km^{2} (436 sq mi)

Population (1999)
  - Total: 318,691
  - Density: 282.5/km^{2} (731.7/sq mi)
- Time zone: UTC+8 (China standard time)

Lingshui Li Autonomous County is an autonomous county in Hainan, China. It is one of the six autonomous counties of Hainan with a postal code of 572400, and in 1999 a population of 318,691, largely made up of the Li people. Notably the beautiful Niuling (牛岭) mountain delimits the tropical area of the county. A well-known natural sight, part of the Chinese Riviera is Xiangshuiwan or Perfume bay (香水湾). Monkey Island, a popular tourist destination located in Lingshui County, is a state-protected nature reserve for macaques. Lingshui is also home to the military base where a U.S. airplane crew were held during the Hainan Island incident in 2001. In September 2010, officials signed and scheduled the construction of the largest sea world theme park in Asia. The Lingshui Li'an Harbor Ocean Theme Park signing ceremony took place at the Narada Resort in Perfume Bay and the opening is planned for 2013.

== Climate ==
Lingshui has a tropical wet and dry climate (Köppen Aw). The average high temperature in the coldest month is 25 °C (77 °F), cold waves are rare, and the Diaoluoshan National Nature Reserve in the territory is home to China's lowland rainforest.

Climate data for Lingshui, elevation 35 m (115 ft), (1991–2020 normals, extremes 1963–present)
Month	Jan	Feb	Mar	Apr	May	Jun	Jul	Aug	Sep	Oct	Nov	Dec	Year
Record high °C (°F)	30.1 (86.2)	31.4 (88.5)	32.4 (90.3)	34.7 (94.5)	36.9 (98.4)	37.2 (99.0)	37.4 (99.3)	36.2 (97.2)	36.6 (97.9)	34.3 (93.7)	32.7 (90.9)	30.8 (87.4)	37.4 (99.3)
Mean daily maximum °C (°F)	24.9 (76.8)	25.9 (78.6)	28.1 (82.6)	30.4 (86.7)	32.2 (90.0)	32.5 (90.5)	32.2 (90.0)	32.2 (90.0)	31.5 (88.7)	29.9 (85.8)	27.9 (82.2)	25.4 (77.7)	29.4 (85.0)
Daily mean °C (°F)	20.7 (69.3)	21.6 (70.9)	23.9 (75.0)	26.4 (79.5)	28.1 (82.6)	28.7 (83.7)	28.3 (82.9)	28.1 (82.6)	27.4 (81.3)	26.1 (79.0)	24.3 (75.7)	21.7 (71.1)	25.4 (77.8)
Mean daily minimum °C (°F)	17.8 (64.0)	18.9 (66.0)	21.2 (70.2)	23.6 (74.5)	25.2 (77.4)	25.9 (78.6)	25.6 (78.1)	25.3 (77.5)	24.6 (76.3)	23.4 (74.1)	21.8 (71.2)	19.1 (66.4)	22.7 (72.9)
Record low °C (°F)	5.6 (42.1)	11.6 (52.9)	11.3 (52.3)	15.2 (59.4)	19.2 (66.6)	22.6 (72.7)	21.9 (71.4)	22.3 (72.1)	20.5 (68.9)	14.5 (58.1)	13.1 (55.6)	7.5 (45.5)	5.6 (42.1)
Average precipitation mm (inches)	16.1 (0.63)	18.4 (0.72)	30.3 (1.19)	80.2 (3.16)	153.2 (6.03)	218.4 (8.60)	291.8 (11.49)	211.9 (8.34)	324.0 (12.76)	321.4 (12.65)	84.1 (3.31)	33.5 (1.32)	1,783.3 (70.2)
Average precipitation days (≥ 0.1 mm)	4.6	4.5	5.5	7.2	13.6	16.2	16.1	16.8	17.8	14.0	8.5	5.5	130.3
Average relative humidity (%)	77	80	81	81	82	83	83	84	83	79	76	74	80
Mean monthly sunshine hours	160.2	144.0	161.0	191.7	220.2	203.3	210.2	203.5	174.2	175.4	160.3	147.0	2,151
Percentage possible sunshine	46	44	43	51	55	51	52	52	48	49	48	43	49
Source: China Meteorological Administration all-time extreme lowall-time October record

== See also ==
- List of administrative divisions of Hainan
