= 2019 Canada Open (badminton) =

2019 badminton tournament in Calgary

Tournament details
- Dates: 2–7 July
- Level: Super 100
- Total prize money: US$75,000
- Venue: Markin-MacPhail Centre
- Location: Calgary, Alberta, Canada

Champions
- Men's singles: (China) Li Shifeng
- Women's singles: (South Korea) An Se-young
- Men's doubles: (Denmark) Mathias Boe (Denmark) Mads Conrad-Petersen
- Women's doubles: (Australia) Setyana Mapasa (Australia) Gronya Somerville
- Mixed doubles: (South Korea) Ko Sung-hyun (South Korea) Eom Hye-won

The 2019 Canada Open (officially known as the Yonex Canada Open 2019 for sponsorship reasons) was a badminton tournament which took place at Markin-MacPhail Centre in Canada from 2 to 7 July 2019 and had a total purse of $75,000.

== Tournament ==
The 2019 Canada Open was the third Super 100 tournament of the 2019 BWF World Tour and also part of the Canada Open championships, which has been held since 1957. This tournament was organized by the Badminton Alberta and sanctioned by the BWF and Badminton Canada.

=== Venue ===
This international tournament was held at Markin-MacPhail Centre in Calgary, Alberta, Canada.

=== Point distribution ===
Below is the point distribution table for each phase of the tournament based on the BWF points system for the BWF Tour Super 100 event.

Winner	Runner-up	3/4	5/8	9/16	17/32	33/64	65/128	129/256
5,500	4,680	3,850	3,030	2,110	1,290	510	240	100

=== Prize money ===
The total prize money for this tournament was US$75,000. Distribution of prize money was in accordance with BWF regulations.

Event	Winner	Finals	Semi-finals	Quarter-finals	Last 16
Singles	$5,625	$2,850	$1,087.50	$450	$262.50
Doubles	$5,925	$2,850	$1,050	$543.75	$281.25

== Men's singles ==
=== Seeds ===
1. (South Korea) Lee Dong-keun (second round)
2. (India) B. Sai Praneeth (withdrew)
3. (India) Prannoy H. S. (second round)
4. (Chinese Taipei) Wang Tzu-wei (semi-finals)
5. (England) Rajiv Ouseph (quarter-finals)
6. (India) Parupalli Kashyap (final)
7. (Japan) Kazumasa Sakai (second round)
8. (Israel) Misha Zilberman (withdrew)

=== Finals ===
Semi-finals
6	(India) Parupalli Kashyap	14	21	21
4	(Chinese Taipei) Wang Tzu-wei	21	17	18
(Japan) Koki Watanabe	22	10	11
(China) Li Shifeng	20	21	21

Final
6	(India) Parupalli Kashyap	22	14	17
(China) Li Shifeng	20	21	21

=== Top half ===
==== Section 1 ====
First Round
Q1	(Chinese Taipei) Yu S-p	21	21
Q6	(Canada) S M H Vakili	13	5
(France) L Claerbout	16	21	22
(Canada) XD Sheng	21	9	20
(Spain) L E Peñalver	14	18
(France) L Corvée	21	21
(Denmark) K R Rajarajan	21	21
(Mexico) L Muñoz	13	19

Second Round
1	(South Korea) Lee D-k	20	14
Q1	(Chinese Taipei) Yu S-p	22	21
(Germany) K Schäfer	15	13
(France) L Claerbout	21	21
6	(India) P Kashyap	21	21
(France) L Corvée	12	17
(China) Ren PB	22	16	21
(Denmark) K R Rajarajan	20	21	18

Third Round
Q1	(Chinese Taipei) Yu S-p	8	13
(France) L Claerbout	21	21
6	(India) P Kashyap	23	21	21
(China) Ren PB	21	23	19

Quarter-finals
(France) L Claerbout	21	21	22
6	(India) P Kashyap	12	23	24

==== Section 2 ====
First Round
(Brazil) Y Coelho	21	19	21
(France) T Rouxel	15	21	19
Q2	(Canada) X Laperrière	11	9
(Denmark) V Svendsen	21	21
(South Korea) Heo K-h	23	21
(Chinese Taipei) Lee C-h	21	10
Q3	(Canada) I Wadia	17	12
(Chinese Taipei) Lin C-y	21	21

Second Round
4	(Chinese Taipei) Wang T-w	21	21
(Brazil) Y Coelho	17	10
Q7	(Canada) YZ Chen	11	10
(Denmark) V Svendsen	21	21
7	(Japan) K Sakai	9	14
(South Korea) Heo K-h	21	21
(Japan) Y Igarashi	13	12
(Chinese Taipei) Lin C-y	21	21

Third Round
4	(Chinese Taipei) Wang T-w	21	21
(Denmark) V Svendsen	17	9
(South Korea) Heo K-h	21	21	22
(Chinese Taipei) Lin C-y	16	23	20

Quarter-finals
4	(Chinese Taipei) Wang T-w	21	21
(South Korea) Heo K-h	12	11

=== Bottom half ===
==== Section 3 ====
First Round
PFQ	(England) K L Chun	7	8
(India) L Sen	21	21
Q4	(Canada) Huang GX	15	22	15
(India) A Jayaram	21	20	21
(Japan) M Koga	21	20	14
Q5	(China) Lei LX	19	22	21
(Japan) K Watanabe	21	21
(Canada) J Ho-Shue	11	16

Second Round
(India) L Sen	7	13
(China) Weng HY	21	21
(India) A Jayaram	19	17
5	(England) R Ouseph	21	21
Q5	(China) Lei LX	21	21
PFQ	(Canada) K Barkman	14	15
(Japan) K Watanabe	21	21
3	(India) Prannoy H. S.	16	10

Third Round
(China) Weng HY	15	17
5	(England) R Ouseph	21	21
Q5	(China) Lei LX	21	17	18
(Japan) K Watanabe	11	21	21

Quarter-finals
5	(England) R Ouseph	17	19
(Japan) K Watanabe	21	21

==== Section 4 ====
First Round
Q8	(Chinese Taipei) Lee Y-y	12	14
(China) Liu HC	21	21
(Canada) B Yang	11	20
(China) Li SF	21	22
PFQ	(Canada) A Li	18	13
(India) S Verma	21	21
(United States) N Waller
(China) Sun FX	w	/	o

Second Round
(China) Liu HC	21	21
(China) Zhou ZQ	12	12
(China) Li SF	21	21
PFQ	(United States) V Chiu	14	13
(India) S Verma	21	21
(Canada) B. R. Sankeerth	14	11
(China) Sun FX	21	18	21
PFQ	(Chinese Taipei) Kan C-y	12	21	17

Third Round
(China) Liu HC	19	21	10
(China) Li SF	21	15	21
(India) S Verma	21	15	21
(China) Sun FX	13	21	15

Quarter-finals
(China) Li SF	21	21
(India) S Verma	15	11

== Women's singles ==
=== Seeds ===
1. (Canada) Michelle Li (quarter-finals)
2. (Japan) Saena Kawakami (second round)
3. (South Korea) Kim Ga-eun (first round)
4. (China) Zhang Yiman (second round)
5. (South Korea) An Se-young (champion)
6. (South Korea) Kim Hyo-min (semi-finals)
7. (Spain) Beatriz Corrales (withdrew)
8. (Thailand) Porntip Buranaprasertsuk (quarter-finals)

=== Finals ===
Semi-finals
5	(South Korea) An Se-young	21	21
(Germany) Fabienne Deprez	17	12
6	(South Korea) Kim Hyo-min	13	13
PFQ	(China) Wang Zhiyi	21	21

Final
5	(South Korea) An Se-young	21	22
PFQ	(China) Wang Zhiyi	15	20

=== Top half ===
==== Section 1 ====
First Round
1	(Canada) M Li	21	19	21
(South Korea) Sim Y-j	17	21	12
PFQ	(Chinese Taipei) Lin H-t	21	21
(Estonia) K Kuuba	16	19
5	(South Korea) An S-y	21	21
Q3	(Chinese Taipei) Hsu W-c	16	14
(Japan) H Mizui	21	21
(China) Ji ST	12	15

Second Round
1	(Canada) M Li	21	21
PFQ	(Chinese Taipei) Lin H-t	16	14
5	(South Korea) An S-y	15	21	21
(Japan) H Mizui	21	10	6

Quarter-finals
1	(Canada) M Li	15	21	3
5	(South Korea) An S-y	21	19	21

==== Section 2 ====
First Round
3	(South Korea) Kim G-e	21	19	20
(Germany) F Deprez	19	21	22
(Spain) C Azurmendi	14	11
(Australia) Chen H-y	21	21
8	(Thailand) P Buranaprasertsuk	21	21
PFQ	(Switzerland) R Stern	17	19
(United States) C Pan	21	22
Q4	(Canada) K Ho-Shue	13	20

Second Round
(Germany) F Deprez	21	15	21
(Australia) Chen H-y	13	21	13
8	(Thailand) P Buranaprasertsuk	21	21
(United States) C Pan	18	15

Quarter-finals
(Germany) F Deprez	21	21
8	(Thailand) P Buranaprasertsuk	16	18

=== Bottom half ===
==== Section 3 ====
First Round
(Chinese Taipei) Chen S-y	21	21
(United States) I Zhong	12	13
Q2	(Canada) WY Zhang	15	8
6	(South Korea) Kim H-m	21	21
(Japan) A Mine	21	21
(Slovakia) M Repiská	5	9
(Mexico) M Ugalde	9	9
4	(China) Zhang YM	21	21

Second Round
(Chinese Taipei) Chen S-y	11	16
6	(South Korea) Kim H-m	21	21
(Japan) A Mine	21	18	21
4	(China) Zhang YM	10	21	17

Quarter-finals
6	(South Korea) Kim H-m	16	21	21
(Japan) A Mine	21	18	12

==== Section 4 ====
First Round
(Chinese Taipei) Hung Y-t	21	20	21
Q1	(Indonesia) R A Riodingin	16	22	18
(United States) D Gupta	5	15
PFQ	(China) Wang ZY	21	21
(Japan) N Oie	21	21
(Denmark) J D Jakobsen	9	16
PFQ	(Canada) T Ng	10	10
2	(Japan) S Kawakami	21	21

Second Round
(Chinese Taipei) Hung Y-t	11	16
PFQ	(China) Wang ZY	21	21
(Japan) N Oie	21	21
2	(Japan) S Kawakami	12	10

Quarter-finals
PFQ	(China) Wang ZY	21	13	21
(Japan) N Oie	12	21	17

== Men's doubles ==
=== Seeds ===
1. (Chinese Taipei) Liao Min-chun / Su Ching-heng (second round)
2. (Chinese Taipei) Lee Yang / Wang Chi-lin (quarter-finals)
3. (Chinese Taipei) Lu Ching-yao / Yang Po-han (semi-finals)
4. (Malaysia) Mohamad Arif Abdul Latif / Nur Mohd Azriyn Ayub (second round)
5. (South Korea) Ko Sung-hyun / Shin Baek-cheol (quarter-finals)
6. (Canada) Jason Ho-Shue / Nyl Yakura (first round)
7. (South Korea) Lee Yong-dae / Yoo Yeon-seong (second round)
8. (Denmark) Mathias Boe / Mads Conrad-Petersen (champions)

=== Finals ===
Semi-finals
(Japan) Keiichiro Matsui (Japan) Yoshinori Takeuchi	21	21	16
(Japan) Hiroki Okamura (Japan) Masayuki Onodera	14	23	21
3	(Chinese Taipei) Lu Ching-yao (Chinese Taipei) Yang Po-han	14	16
8	(Denmark) Mathias Boe (Denmark) Mads Conrad-Petersen	21	21

Final
(Japan) Hiroki Okamura (Japan) Masayuki Onodera	12	18
8	(Denmark) Mathias Boe (Denmark) Mads Conrad-Petersen	21	21

=== Top half ===
==== Section 1 ====
First Round
1	(Chinese Taipei) Liao M-c (Chinese Taipei) Su C-h	21	21
(France) T Gicquel (France) R Labar	14	17
(Germany) J R Jansen (Germany) P Käsbauer	18	22
(Japan) K Matsui (Japan) Y Takeuchi	21	24
5	(South Korea) Ko S-h (South Korea) Shin B-c	22	21
(Germany) B Geiss (Germany) J C Völker	20	16
(Japan) A Koga (Japan) T Saito	19	21	21
(Australia) S Leung (Australia) M Wheller	21	9	8

Second Round
1	(Chinese Taipei) Liao M-c (Chinese Taipei) Su C-h	21	15	14
(Japan) K Matsui (Japan) Y Takeuchi	13	21	21
5	(South Korea) Ko S-h (South Korea) Shin B-c	21	22
(Japan) A Koga (Japan) T Saito	18	20

Quarter-finals
(Japan) K Matsui (Japan) Y Takeuchi	21	21
5	(South Korea) Ko S-h (South Korea) Shin B-c	19	14

==== Section 2 ====
First Round
4	(Malaysia) M Arif A L (Malaysia) N M Azriyn A	21	21
Q1	(Canada) J Lai (Canada) T A Lindeman	14	18
Q4	(Canada) A Ko (Canada) I Wadia	13	9
(Japan) H Okamura (Japan) M Onodera	21	21
6	(Canada) J Ho-Shue (Canada) N Yakura	21	16	17
(Japan) M Kaneko (Japan) Y Kubota	18	21	21
(Scotland) A Dunn (Scotland) A Hall	21	21
Q3	(Denmark) P Bjerregaard (Denmark) S Rasmussen	19	8

Second Round
4	(Malaysia) M Arif A L (Malaysia) N M Azriyn A	17	21	10
(Japan) H Okamura (Japan) M Onodera	21	16	21
(Japan) M Kaneko (Japan) Y Kubota	21	21
(Scotland) A Dunn (Scotland) A Hall	12	17

Quarter-finals
(Japan) H Okamura (Japan) M Onodera	10	21	30
(Japan) M Kaneko (Japan) Y Kubota	21	17	28

=== Bottom half ===
==== Section 3 ====
First Round
Q2	(China) Dong WJ (China) Guo XW	15	21	22
(Chinese Taipei) Lee J-h (Chinese Taipei) Yang P-hs	21	16	24
(Japan) S Hoshino (Japan) Y Nishikawa	20	21	19
7	(South Korea) Lee Y-d (South Korea) Yoo Y-s	22	17	21
(Netherlands) J Arends (Netherlands) R Jille	17	21	21
(South Korea) Kang M-h (South Korea) Kim W-h	21	11	23
(Canada) J Hurlburt-Yu (Canada) D Yao	13	12
3	(Chinese Taipei) Lu C-y (Chinese Taipei) Yang P-ha	21	21

Second Round
(Chinese Taipei) Lee J-h (Chinese Taipei) Yang P-hs	21	21
7	(South Korea) Lee Y-d (South Korea) Yoo Y-s	17	17
(South Korea) Kang M-h (South Korea) Kim W-h	21	19	22
3	(Chinese Taipei) Lu C-y (Chinese Taipei) Yang P-ha	14	21	24

Quarter-finals
(Chinese Taipei) Lee J-h (Chinese Taipei) Yang P-hs	21	18	14
3	(Chinese Taipei) Lu C-y (Chinese Taipei) Yang P-ha	11	21	21

==== Section 4 ====
First Round
(United States) P Chew (United States) R Chew	16	21	11
(Thailand) S Jomkoh (Thailand) W Sothon	21	19	21
(China) Liang WK (China) Shang YC	21	19	13
8	(Denmark) M Boe (Denmark) M Conrad-Petersen	19	21	21
(England) B Lane (England) S Vendy	w	/	o
(Mexico) J Castillo (Mexico) L Muñoz
PFQ	(England) P Briggs (Canada) B Yang	10	12
2	(Chinese Taipei) Lee Y (Chinese Taipei) Wang C-l	21	21

Second Round
(Thailand) S Jomkoh (Thailand) W Sothon	13	19
8	(Denmark) M Boe (Denmark) M Conrad-Petersen	21	21
(England) B Lane (England) S Vendy	21	13
2	(Chinese Taipei) Lee Y (Chinese Taipei) Wang C-l	23	21

Quarter-finals
8	(Denmark) M Boe (Denmark) M Conrad-Petersen	21	21
2	(Chinese Taipei) Lee Y (Chinese Taipei) Wang C-l	15	19

== Women's doubles ==
=== Seeds ===
1. (Japan) Nami Matsuyama / Chiharu Shida (quarter-finals)
2. (France) Émilie Lefel / Anne Tran (first round)
3. (Canada) Rachel Honderich / Kristen Tsai (quarter-finals)
4. (France) Delphine Delrue / Léa Palermo (quarter-finals)
5. (South Korea) Baek Ha-na / Jung Kyung-eun (semi-finals)
6. (South Korea) Chang Ye-na / Kim Hye-rin (final)
7. (Australia) Setyana Mapasa / Gronya Somerville (champions)
8. (Chinese Taipei) Hsu Ya-ching / Hu Ling-fang (second round)

=== Finals ===
Semi-finals
5	(South Korea) Baek Ha-na (South Korea) Jung Kyung-eun	12	21	17
6	(South Korea) Chang Ye-na (South Korea) Kim Hye-rin	21	14	21
7	(Australia) Setyana Mapasa (Australia) Gronya Somerville	21	21
(China) Huang Jia (China) Yu Xiaohan	19	19

Final
6	(South Korea) Chang Ye-na (South Korea) Kim Hye-rin	16	14
7	(Australia) Setyana Mapasa (Australia) Gronya Somerville	21	21

=== Top half ===
==== Section 1 ====
First Round
1	(Japan) N Matsuyama (Japan) C Shida	21	21
(Canada) C Lai (Canada) WY Zhang	15	17
(United States) A Lee (United States) S Lee	7	8
(Germany) E Janssens (Germany) K Ostermeyer	21	21
5	(South Korea) Baek H-n (South Korea) Jung K-e	21	21
(Canada) C Choi (Canada) J Wu	10	7
(Japan) S Ozaki (Japan) A Watanabe	21	21
(China) Chen LZ (China) He XY	16	13

Second Round
1	(Japan) N Matsuyama (Japan) C Shida	21	21
(Germany) E Janssens (Germany) K Ostermeyer	4	11
5	(South Korea) Baek H-n (South Korea) Jung K-e	21	21
(Japan) S Ozaki (Japan) A Watanabe	13	17

Quarter-finals
1	(Japan) N Matsuyama (Japan) C Shida	17	17
5	(South Korea) Baek H-n (South Korea) Jung K-e	21	21

==== Section 2 ====
First Round
4	(France) D Delrue (France) L Palermo	21	21
(Chinese Taipei) Chen L (Chinese Taipei) Chen S-y	14	19
(Canada) K O'Donoghue (Canada) Y Tai	w	/	o
(Chinese Taipei) Pai Y-p (Chinese Taipei) Wu T-j
5	(South Korea) Chang Y-n (South Korea) Kim H-r	21	21
(Chinese Taipei) Chiu P-c (Chinese Taipei) Hung Y-t	12	19
(China) Chen JY (China) Chen YY	21	21
(Canada) C Leblanc (Canada) A Mocanu	8	11

Second Round
4	(France) D Delrue (France) L Palermo	21	21
(Canada) K O'Donoghue (Canada) Y Tai	14	9
5	(South Korea) Chang Y-n (South Korea) Kim H-r	19	21	21
(China) Chen JY (China) Chen YY	21	12	13

Quarter-finals
4	(France) D Delrue (France) L Palermo	23	16
5	(South Korea) Chang Y-n (South Korea) Kim H-r	25	21

=== Bottom half ===
==== Section 3 ====
First Round
(Chinese Taipei) Li Z-q (Chinese Taipei) Teng C-h	19	21	23
(Scotland) J MacPherson (England) J Moore	21	17	21
(China) Kang Y (China) Xie ZT	23	11	16
7	(Australia) S Mapasa (Australia) G Somerville	21	21	21
(Chinese Taipei) Chang C-h (Chinese Taipei) Yang C-t	21	19	19
(Chinese Taipei) Cheng C-y (Chinese Taipei) Lee C-c	17	21	21
(China) Chen XF (China) Zhang SX	21	14	17
3	(Canada) R Honderich (Canada) K Tsai	12	21	21

Second Round
(Chinese Taipei) Li Z-q (Chinese Taipei) Teng C-h	14	17
7	(Australia) S Mapasa (Australia) G Somerville	21	21
(Chinese Taipei) Cheng C-y (Chinese Taipei) Lee C-c	11	9
3	(Canada) R Honderich (Canada) K Tsai	21	21

Quarter-finals
7	(Australia) S Mapasa (Australia) G Somerville	w	/	o
3	(Canada) R Honderich (Canada) K Tsai

==== Section 4 ====
First Round
(Canada) K Ho-Shue (Canada) M Tong	6	13
(Denmark) A Bøje (Denmark) M Poulsen	21	21
(Canada) J Cheung (Canada) T Ng	15	14
8	(Chinese Taipei) Hsu Y-c (Chinese Taipei) Hu L-f	21	21
(China) Gao ZY (China) Peng Q	21	16	13
(China) Huang J (China) Yu XH	13	21	21
(China) Liu XX (China) Xia YT	21	21
2	(France) É Lefel (France) A Tran	11	15

Second Round
(Denmark) A Bøje (Denmark) M Poulsen	21	21
8	(Chinese Taipei) Hsu Y-c (Chinese Taipei) Hu L-f	15	19
(China) Huang J (China) Yu XH	21	17	22
(China) Liu XX (China) Xia YT	18	21	20

Quarter-finals
(Denmark) A Bøje (Denmark) M Poulsen	23	17
(China) Huang J (China) Yu XH	25	21

== Mixed doubles ==
=== Seeds ===
1. (England) Ben Lane / Jessica Pugh (quarter-finals)
2. (France) Thom Gicquel / Delphine Delrue (semi-finals)
3. (Canada) Joshua Hurlburt-Yu / Josephine Wu (quarter-finals)
4. (Chinese Taipei) Wang Chi-lin / Cheng Chi-ya (second round)
5. (Denmark) Mathias Christiansen / Alexandra Bøje (quarter-finals)
6. (France) Ronan Labar / Anne Tran (first round)
7. (Chinese Taipei) Lu Ching-yao / Lee Chia-hsin (quarter-finals)
8. (South Korea) Kim Won-ho / Baek Ha-na (withdrew)

=== Finals ===
Semi-finals
PFQ	(China) Guo Xinwa (China) Zhang Shuxian	21	21
Q3	(Chinese Taipei) Lee Jhe-huei (Chinese Taipei) Hsu Ya-ching	11	13
(South Korea) Ko Sung-hyun (South Korea) Eom Hye-won	21	21
2	(France) Thom Gicquel (France) Delphine Delrue	18	16

Final
PFQ	(China) Guo Xinwa (China) Zhang Shuxian	19	19
(South Korea) Ko Sung-hyun (South Korea) Eom Hye-won	21	21

=== Top half ===
==== Section 1 ====
First Round
1	(England) B Lane (England) J Pugh	21	21
Q1	(Chinese Taipei) Yu S-p (Chinese Taipei) Lee Z-q	13	11
(Canada) J Lai (Canada) W Zhang	23	17
(Malaysia) M Arif A L (Indonesia) R A Riodingin	25	21
PFQ	(China) Guo XW (China) Zhang SX	21	21
(United States) M Fogarty (United States) I Zhong	12	12
(Scotland) A Hall (Scotland) J MacPherson	21	21
(Germany) J C Völker (Germany) E Janssens	16	12

Second Round
1	(England) B Lane (England) J Pugh	16	21	21
(Malaysia) M Arif A L (Indonesia) R A Riodingin	21	16	13
PFQ	(China) Guo XW (China) Zhang SX	21	18	21
(Scotland) A Hall (Scotland) J MacPherson	15	21	14

Quarter-finals
1	(England) B Lane (England) J Pugh	21	13	13
PFQ	(China) Guo XW (China) Zhang SX	17	21	21

==== Section 2 ====
First Round
3	(Canada) J Hurlburt-Yu (Canada) J Wu	21	21
(China) Dong WJ (China) Chen XF	15	16
(Chinese Taipei) Yang P-hs (Chinese Taipei) Hu L-f	w	/	o
PFQ	(Canada) D Yao (Canada) C Lai
6	(France) R Labar (France) A Tran	16	19
Q3	(Chinese Taipei) Lee J-h (Chinese Taipei) Hsu Y-c	21	21
(Germany) J R Jansen (Germany) K Ostermeyer	21	21
(United States) V Chiu (United States) B Chi	15	19

Second Round
3	(Canada) J Hurlburt-Yu (Canada) J Wu	10	21	21
(Chinese Taipei) Yang P-hs (Chinese Taipei) Hu L-f	21	17	14
Q3	(Chinese Taipei) Lee J-h (Chinese Taipei) Hsu Y-c	21	12	21
(Germany) J R Jansen (Germany) K Ostermeyer	15	21	18

Quarter-finals
3	(Canada) J Hurlburt-Yu (Canada) J Wu	17	13
Q3	(Chinese Taipei) Lee J-h (Chinese Taipei) Hsu Y-c	21	21

=== Bottom half ===
==== Section 3 ====
First Round
(Thailand) S Jomkoh (Thailand) S Paewsampran	21	22
Q4	(South Korea) Kim J-h (South Korea) Kim H-r	8	20
(Chinese Taipei) Lee Y (Chinese Taipei) Yang C-t	15	13
7	(Chinese Taipei) Lu C-y (Chinese Taipei) Lee C-h	21	21
(South Korea) Ko S-h (South Korea) Eom H-w	21	21
PFQ	(Australia) M Wheller (Australia) Chen H-s	16	8
Q2	(Canada) Sheng XD (United States) C Pan	5	18
4	(Chinese Taipei) Wang C-l (Chinese Taipei) Cheng C-y	21	21

Second Round
(Thailand) S Jomkoh (Thailand) S Paewsampran	15	21	14
7	(Chinese Taipei) Lu C-y (Chinese Taipei) Lee C-h	21	14	21
(South Korea) Ko S-h (South Korea) Eom H-w	21	21
4	(Chinese Taipei) Wang C-l (Chinese Taipei) Cheng C-y	12	11

Quarter-finals
7	(Chinese Taipei) Lu C-y (Chinese Taipei) Lee C-h	14	13
(South Korea) Ko S-h (South Korea) Eom H-w	21	21

==== Section 4 ====
First Round
(Australia) S Leung W H (Australia) G Somerville	21	21
(Canada) N Nguyen (Canada) A Mocanu	16	13
(Canada) T A Lindeman (Canada) R Honderich	16	15
5	(Denmark) M Christiansen (Denmark) A Bøje	21	21
(United States) P Chew (United States) A Lee	17	21	16
(United States) R Chew (United States) S Lee	21	18	21
(England) C Hemming (England) J Moore	14	17
2	(France) T Gicquel (France) D Delrue	21	21

Second Round
(Australia) S Leung W H (Australia) G Somerville	11	12
5	(Denmark) M Christiansen (Denmark) A Bøje	21	21
(United States) R Chew (United States) S Lee	14	14
2	(France) T Gicquel (France) D Delrue	21	21

Quarter-finals
5	(Denmark) M Christiansen (Denmark) A Bøje	13	15
2	(France) T Gicquel (France) D Delrue	21	21

Preceded by 2019 Australian Open	BWF World Tour; 2019 BWF season	Succeeded by 2019 U.S. Open
