= 2015 Japan Super Series =

Tournament details
- Dates: 8 September 2015 – 13 September 2015
- Level: Super Series
- Total prize money: US$275,000
- Venue: Tokyo Metropolitan Gymnasium
- Location: Tokyo, Japan

Champions
- Men's singles: (China) Lin Dan
- Women's singles: (Japan) Nozomi Okuhara
- Men's doubles: (South Korea) Lee Yong-dae (South Korea) Yoo Yeon-seong
- Women's doubles: (China) Zhao Yunlei (China) Zhong Qianxin
- Mixed doubles: (Denmark) Joachim Fischer Nielsen (Denmark) Christinna Pedersen

The 2015 Japan Super Series was the seventh Super Series tournament of the 2015 BWF Super Series. The tournament took place in Tokyo, Japan from 8–13 September 2015 with a total prize money of $275,000. A qualification were held to fill four places in all five disciplines of the main draws.

== Men's singles ==
=== Seeds ===
1. (China) Chen Long (Second round)
2. (Denmark) Jan Ø. Jørgensen (Withdrew)
3. (India) Srikanth Kidambi (Second round)
4. (Japan) Kento Momota (Second round)
5. (China) Lin Dan (Champion)
6. (Chinese Taipei) Chou Tien-chen (Semi Final)
7. (Denmark) Viktor Axelsen (Final)
8. (China) Wang Zhengming (First round)

=== Top half ===
First round
1 | (China) Chen L | 21 | 21
(England) R Ouseph | 10 | 14
(China) Tian HW | 22 | 21
(Hong Kong) Ng K L | 20 | 16
5 | (China) Lin D | 17 | 25 | 21
(South Korea) Son W-h | 21 | 23 | 17
(Thailand) B Ponsana | 21 | 15 | 16
Q4 | (Malaysia) Lee C W | 10 | 21 | 21
4 | (Japan) K Momota | 21 | 21
(Hong Kong) Wei N | 17 | 17
(Indonesia) T Sugiarto | 21 | 21
(Chinese Taipei) Hsu J-h | 10 | 17
8 | (China) Wang ZM | 21 | 19 | 18
(Hong Kong) Hu Y | 10 | 21 | 21
Q1 | (Indonesia) I M Mustofa | 21 | 18 | 21
(Germany) M Zwiebler | 15 | 21 | 18

Second round
1 | (China) Chen L | 16 | 17
(China) Tian HW | 21 | 21
5 | (China) Lin D | 21 | 21
Q4 | (Malaysia) Lee C W | 17 | 10
4 | (Japan) K Momota | 21 | 13 | 19
(Indonesia) T Sugiarto | 16 | 21 | 21
(Hong Kong) Hu Y | 5 | 14
Q1 | (Indonesia) I M Mustofa | 21 | 21

Quarterfinals
(China) Tian HW | 14 | 18
5 | (China) Lin D | 21 | 21
(Indonesia) T Sugiarto | 21 | 21
Q1 | (Indonesia) I M Mustofa | 10 | 5

Semifinals
5 | (China) Lin D | 21 | 21
(Indonesia) T Sugiarto | 17 | 17

=== Bottom half ===
First round
(Thailand) T Saensomboonsuk | 22 | 21 | 14
(Indonesia) D H Rumbaka | 24 | 15 | 21
(Japan) S Sasaki | 14 | 12
6 | (Chinese Taipei) Chou T-c | 21 | 21
(Japan) T Ueda | 2^{r}
(India) P Kashyap | 3
(Republic of Ireland) S Evans | 18 | 15
3 | (India) Srikanth K. | 21 | 21
Q2 | (Chinese Taipei) Wang T-w | 21 | 14 | 18
(Denmark) H-K Vittinghus | 16 | 21 | 21
(India) A Jayaram | 10 | 10
7 | (Denmark) V Axelsen | 21 | 21
(Hong Kong) Wong W K | 21 | 20
(India) H. S. Prannoy | 23 | 22
Q3 | (South Korea) Lee D-k | 23 | 21
PFQ | (India) B S Praneeth | 21 | 10

Second round
(Indonesia) D H Rumbaka | 13 | 21 | 16
6 | (Chinese Taipei) Chou T-c | 21 | 17 | 21
(India) P Kashyap | 21 | 21
3 | (India) Srikanth K. | 11 | 19
(Denmark) H-K Vittinghus | 10 | 18
7 | (Denmark) V Axelsen | 21 | 21
(India) H. S. Prannoy | 9 | 16
Q3 | (South Korea) Lee D-k | 21 | 21

Quarterfinals
6 | (Chinese Taipei) Chou T-c | 21 | 21
(India) P Kashyap | 14 | 18
7 | (Denmark) V Axelsen | 23 | 21
Q3 | (South Korea) Lee D-k | 21 | 17

Semifinals
6 | (Chinese Taipei) Chou T-c | 19 | 13
7 | (Denmark) V Axelsen | 21 | 21

=== Finals ===
Semifinals
5 | (China) Lin Dan | 21 | 21
(Indonesia) Tommy Sugiarto | 17 | 17
6 | (Chinese Taipei) Chou Tien-chen | 19 | 13
7 | (Denmark) Viktor Axelsen | 21 | 21

Final
5 | (China) Lin Dan | 21 | 16 | 21
7 | (Denmark) Viktor Axelsen | 19 | 21 | 19

== Women's singles ==
=== Seeds ===
1. (Spain) Carolina Marín (Quarterfinals)
2. (India) Saina Nehwal (2nd round)
3. (China) Li Xuerui (Quarterfinals)
4. (Chinese Taipei) Tai Tzu-ying (Semifinals)
5. (Thailand) Ratchanok Intanon (2nd round)
6. (China) Wang Yihan (Quarterfinals)
7. (China) Wang Shixian (Semifinals)
8. (South Korea) Sung Ji-hyun (1st round)

=== Top half ===
First round
1 | (Spain) C Marín | 27 | 21 | 21
(Japan) Y Hashimoto | 29 | 15 | 18
(South Korea) Kim H-m | 17 | 19
(Japan) S Takahashi | 21 | 21
7 | (China) Wang SX | 21 | 21
Q3 | (Japan) S Kawakami | 18 | 18
(China) Sun Y | 20 | 11
Q2 | (Japan) A Mine | 22 | 21
3 | (China) Li XR | W | / | O
(Indonesia) L Fanetri
(Japan) K Imabeppu | 19 | 26 | 22
(Thailand) P Buranaprasertsuk | 21 | 24 | 20
8 | (South Korea) Sung J-h | 18 | 12
(Japan) A Yamaguchi | 21 | 21
(United States) Zhang BW | 21 | 17 | 21
(Japan) S Sato | 18 | 21 | 17

Second round
1 | (Spain) C Marín | 21 | 15 | 21
(Japan) S Takahashi | 17 | 21 | 12
7 | (China) Wang SX | 15 | 23 | 21
Q2 | (Japan) A Mine | 21 | 21 | 14
3 | (China) Li XR | 21 | 23
(Japan) K Imabeppu | 15 | 21
(Japan) A Yamaguchi | 21 | 21
(United States) Zhang BW | 11 | 15

Quarterfinals
1 | (Spain) C Marín | 21 | 19 | 15
7 | (China) Wang SX | 13 | 21 | 21
3 | (China) Li XR | 19 | 21 | 16
(Japan) A Yamaguchi | 21 | 13 | 21

Semifinals
7 | (China) Wang SX | 12 | 21 | 24
(Japan) A Yamaguchi | 21 | 15 | 26

=== Bottom half ===
First round
Q4 | (Japan) M Araki | 17 | 11
(Chinese Taipei) Pai Y-p | 21 | 21
(Canada) M Li | 8 | 12
6 | (China) Wang YH | 21 | 21
(South Korea) Bae Y-j | 21 | 21
(Indonesia) M F Kusumastuti | 16 | 13
Q1 | (Japan) K Ito | 8 | 15
4 | (Chinese Taipei) Tai T-y | 21 | 21
(Hong Kong) Cheung N Y | 9 | 14
(Japan) N Okuhara | 21 | 21
(Hong Kong) Yip P Y | 18 | 18
5 | (Thailand) R Intanon | 21 | 21
(India) P. V. Sindhu | 13 | 21 | 11
(Japan) M Mitani | 21 | 17 | 21
(Thailand) B Ongbumrungpan | 14 | 20
2 | (India) S Nehwal | 21 | 22

Second round
(Chinese Taipei) Pai Y-p | 18 | 12
6 | (China) Wang YH | 21 | 21
(South Korea) Bae Y-j | 15 | 11
4 | (Chinese Taipei) Tai T-y | 21 | 21
(Japan) N Okuhara | 15 | 21 | 21
5 | (Thailand) R Intanon | 21 | 13 | 3
(Japan) M Mitani | 21 | 21
2 | (India) S Nehwal | 13 | 16

Quarterfinals
6 | (China) Wang YH | 18 | 21 | 13
4 | (Chinese Taipei) Tai T-y | 21 | 17 | 21
(Japan) N Okuhara | 21 | 18 | 21
(Japan) M Mitani | 16 | 21 | 15

Semifinals
4 | (Chinese Taipei) Tai T-y | 12 | 21 | 19
(Japan) N Okuhara | 21 | 14 | 21

=== Finals ===
Semifinals
7 | (China) Wang Shixian | 12 | 21 | 24
(Japan) Akane Yamaguchi | 21 | 15 | 26
4 | (Chinese Taipei) Tai Tzu-ying | 12 | 21 | 19
(Japan) Nozomi Okuhara | 21 | 14 | 21

Final
(Japan) Akane Yamaguchi | 18 | 12
(Japan) Nozomi Okuhara | 21 | 21

== Men's doubles ==
=== Seeds ===
1. (South Korea) Lee Yong-dae / Yoo Yeon-seong (Champion)
2. (Denmark) Mathias Boe / Carsten Mogensen (2nd round)
3. (Indonesia) Mohammad Ahsan / Hendra Setiawan (Quarterfinals)
4. (China) Chai Biao / Hong Wei (1st round)
5. (China) Fu Haifeng / Zhang Nan (Final)
6. (Japan) Hiroyuki Endo / Kenichi Hayakawa (Semifinals)
7. (South Korea) Ko Sung-hyun / Shin Baek-cheol (2nd round)
8. (Chinese Taipei) Lee Sheng-mu / Tsai Chia-hsin (1st round)

=== Top half ===
First round
1 | (South Korea) Lee Y-d (South Korea) Yoo Y-s | 21 | 21
(Japan) T Inoue (Japan) Y Kaneko | 12 | 15
(Indonesia) A Adistia (Indonesia) H A Gunawan | 17 | 18
(China) Cai Y (China) Lu K | 21 | 21
7 | (South Korea) Ko S-h (South Korea) Shin B-c | 12 | 21 | 21
(Japan) T Hoki (Japan) Y Kobayashi | 21 | 16 | 15
(Japan) T Kamura (Japan) K Sonoda | 15 | 21 | 21
(China) Wang YL (China) Zhang W | 21 | 9 | 19
4 | (China) Chai B (China) Hong W | 10 | 19
(Denmark) M Conrad-Petersen (Denmark) M Pieler Kolding | 21 | 21
Q4 | (Indonesia) M Kido (Indonesia) A P R Putra | 11 | 6
(Indonesia) A Pratama (Indonesia) R K Suwardi | 21 | 21
8 | (Chinese Taipei) Lee S-m (Chinese Taipei) Tsai C-h | 14 | 20
(Denmark) K Astrup (Denmark) A S Rasmussen | 21 | 22
(Malaysia) Goh V S (Malaysia) Tan W K | 19 | 21 | 21
Q2 | (Japan) H Saeki (Japan) R Taohata | 21 | 19 | 16

Second round
1 | (South Korea) Lee Y-d (South Korea) Yoo Y-s | 21 | 21
(China) Cai Y (China) Lu K | 12 | 14
7 | (South Korea) Ko S-h (South Korea) Shin B-c | 21 | 15 | 19
(Japan) T Kamura (Japan) K Sonoda | 9 | 21 | 21
(Denmark) M Conrad-Petersen (Denmark) M Pieler Kolding | 18 | 15
(Indonesia) A Pratama (Indonesia) R K Suwardi | 21 | 21
(Denmark) K Astrup (Denmark) A S Rasmussen | 21 | 20 | 16
(Malaysia) Goh V S (Malaysia) Tan W K | 15 | 22 | 21

Quarterfinals
1 | (South Korea) Lee Y-d (South Korea) Yoo Y-s | 21 | 21
(Japan) T Kamura (Japan) K Sonoda | 14 | 15
(Indonesia) A Pratama (Indonesia) R K Suwardi | 21 | 21
(Malaysia) Goh V S (Malaysia) Tan W K | 16 | 13

Semifinals
1 | (South Korea) Lee Y-d (South Korea) Yoo Y-s | 21 | 21
(Indonesia) A Pratama (Indonesia) R K Suwardi | 16 | 16

=== Bottom half ===
First round
(Japan) H Hashimoto (Japan) N Hirata | 22 | 18 | 21
(Indonesia) W Nayaka (Indonesia) A Yusuf | 20 | 21 | 10
(England) M Ellis (England) C Langridge | 11 | 16
5 | (China) Fu HF (China) Zhang N | 21 | 21
(Russia) V Ivanov (Russia) I Sozonov | 21 | 25
Q3 | (Chinese Taipei) Liao M-c (Chinese Taipei) Tseng M-h | 10 | 23
(Japan) K Kazuno (Japan) K Yamada | 17 | 12
3 | (Indonesia) M Ahsan (Indonesia) H Setiwan | 21 | 21
Q1 | (Thailand) D Puavaranukroh (Thailand) K Kedren | 21 | 21
(United States) P Chew (United States) S Pongnairat | 11 | 11
(Indonesia) M F Gideon (Indonesia) K S Sukamuljo | 21 | 15 | 15
6 | (Japan) H Endo (Japan) K Hayakawa | 19 | 21 | 21
(Malaysia) Hoon T H (Malaysia) Lim K W | 23 | 19 | 11
(South Korea) Kim K-j (South Korea) Kim S-r | 21 | 21 | 21
(China) Liu XL (China) Qiu ZH | 17 | 17
2 | (Denmark) M Boe (Denmark) C Mogensen | 21 | 21

Second round
(Japan) H Hashimoto (Japan) N Hirata | 18 | 4
5 | (China) Fu HF (China) Zhang N | 21 | 21
(Russia) V Ivanov (Russia) I Sozonov | 21 | 15 | 18
3 | (Indonesia) M Ahsan (Indonesia) H Setiwan | 19 | 21 | 21
Q1 | (Thailand) D Puavaranukroh (Thailand) K Kedren | 12 | 14
6 | (Japan) H Endo (Japan) K Hayakawa | 21 | 21
(South Korea) Kim K-j (South Korea) Kim S-r | 18 | 21 | 21
2 | (Denmark) M Boe (Denmark) C Mogensen | 21 | 18 | 16

Quarterfinals
5 | (China) Fu HF (China) Zhang N | 21 | 21
3 | (Indonesia) M Ahsan (Indonesia) H Setiwan | 9 | 18
6 | (Japan) H Endo (Japan) K Hayakawa | 21 | 21
(South Korea) Kim K-j (South Korea) Kim S-r | 11 | 18

Semifinals
5 | (China) Fu HF (China) Zhang N | 21 | 21
6 | (Japan) H Endo (Japan) K Hayakawa | 15 | 14

=== Finals ===
Semifinals
1 | (South Korea) Lee Yong-dae (South Korea) Yoo Yeon-seong | 21 | 21
(Indonesia) Angga Pratama (Indonesia) Ricky Karanda Suwardi | 16 | 16
5 | (China) Fu Haifeng (China) Zhang Nan | 21 | 21
6 | (Japan) Hiroyuki Endo (Japan) Kenichi Hayakawa | 15 | 14

Final
1 | (South Korea) Lee Yong-dae (South Korea) Yoo Yeon-seong | 21 | 29
5 | (China) Fu Haifeng (China) Zhang Nan | 19 | 27

== Women's doubles ==
=== Seeds ===
1. (Japan) Misaki Matsutomo / Ayaka Takahashi (2nd round)
2. (China) Luo Ying / Luo Yu (Quarterfinals)
3. (China) Wang Xiaoli / Yu Yang (2nd round)
4. (Denmark) Christinna Pedersen / Kamilla Rytter Juhl (Final)
5. (China) Ma Jin / Tang Yuanting (1st round)
6. (Indonesia) Nitya Krishinda Maheswari / Greysia Polii (Quarterfinals)
7. (Japan) Reika Kakiiwa / Miyuki Maeda (2nd round)
8. (China) Zhao Yunlei / Zhong Qianxin (Champion)

=== Top half ===
First round
1 | (Japan) M Matsutomo (Japan) A Takahashi | 21 | 21
(India) P Gadre (India) N S Reddy | 6 | 17
(United States) E Lee (United States) P L Obanana | 6 | 7
(Japan) S Matsuo (Japan) M Naito | 21 | 21
5 | (China) Ma J (China) Tang YT | 21 | 22 | 19
(South Korea) Go A-r (South Korea) Yoo H-w | 9 | 24 | 21
Q4 | (South Korea) Chang Y-n (South Korea) Lee S-h | 22 | 16 | 21
(Japan) S Tanaka (Japan) K Yonemoto | 20 | 21 | 15
4 | (Denmark) C Pedersen (Denmark) K Rytter Juhl | 21 | 21
(Japan) Y Fukushima (Japan) S Hirota | 19 | 12
Q3 | (Japan) R Kawashima (Japan) S Ozaki | 21 | 21
PFQ | (Japan) M Matsumoto (Japan) W Nagahara | 16 | 16
6 | (Indonesia) N K Maheswari (Indonesia) G Polii | 16 | 21 | 21
(Japan) N Fukuman (Japan) K Yonao | 21 | 12 | 11
(South Korea) Eom H-w (South Korea) Kim H-n | 21 | 19 | 21
PFQ | (Japan) R Etoh (Japan) A Matsuda | 13 | 21 | 18

Second round
1 | (Japan) M Matsutomo (Japan) A Takahashi
(Japan) S Matsuo (Japan) M Naito | W | / | O
(South Korea) Go A-r (South Korea) Yoo H-w | 20 | 13
Q4 | (South Korea) Chang Y-n (South Korea) Lee S-h | 22 | 21
4 | (Denmark) C Pedersen (Denmark) K Rytter Juhl | 21 | 21
Q3 | (Japan) R Kawashima (Japan) S Ozaki | 12 | 15
6 | (Indonesia) N K Maheswari (Indonesia) G Polii | 22 | 21
(South Korea) Eom H-w (South Korea) Kim H-n | 20 | 15

Quarterfinals
(Japan) S Matsuo (Japan) M Naito | 13 | 21 | 24
Q4 | (South Korea) Chang Y-n (South Korea) Lee S-h | 21 | 16 | 22
4 | (Denmark) C Pedersen (Denmark) K Rytter Juhl | 21 | 21
6 | (Indonesia) N K Maheswari (Indonesia) G Polii | 19 | 17

Semifinals
(Japan) S Matsuo (Japan) M Naito | 17 | 16
4 | (Denmark) C Pedersen (Denmark) K Rytter Juhl | 21 | 21

=== Bottom half ===
First round
(Hong Kong) Poon L Y (Hong Kong) Tse Y S | 21 | 21
(Chinese Taipei) Hsieh P-c (Chinese Taipei) Wu T-j | 18 | 15
(India) J Gutta (India) A Ponnappa | 20 | 21 | 13
8 | (China) Zhao YL (China) Zhong QX | 22 | 18 | 21
(Netherlands) S Barning (Netherlands) I Tabeling | 7 | 9
(China) Tang JH (China) Tian Q | 21 | 21
(Japan) A Kurihara (Japan) N Shinoya | 21 | 9 | 9
3 | (China) Wang XL (China) Yu Y | 19 | 21 | 21
Q1 | (South Korea) Jung K-e (South Korea) Shin S-c | 18 | 21 | 10
(South Korea) Chae Y-j (South Korea) Kim S-y | 21 | 16 | 21
Q2 | (Thailand) C Chaladchalam (Thailand) P Muenwong | 17 | 17
7 | (Japan) R Kakiiwa (Japan) M Maeda | 21 | 21
(Netherlands) E Muskens (Netherlands) S Piek | 21 | 21
(Thailand) P Supajirakul (Thailand) S Taerattanachai | 15 | 13
(Chinese Taipei) Hsu Y-c (Chinese Taipei) Pai Y-p | 17 | 13
2 | (China) Luo Y (China) Luo Y | 21 | 21

Second round
(Hong Kong) Poon L Y (Hong Kong) Tse Y S | 18 | 15
8 | (China) Zhao YL (China) Zhong QX | 21 | 21
(China) Tang JH (China) Tian Q | 21 | 21
3 | (China) Wang XL (China) Yu Y | 9 | 17
(South Korea) Chae Y-j (South Korea) Kim S-y | 21 | 21
7 | (Japan) R Kakiiwa (Japan) M Maeda | 12 | 13
(Netherlands) E Muskens (Netherlands) S Piek | 15 | 21 | 15
2 | (China) Luo Y (China) Luo Y | 21 | 15 | 21

Quarterfinals
8 | (China) Zhao YL (China) Zhong QX | 21 | 23
(China) Tang JH (China) Tian Q | 19 | 21
(South Korea) Chae Y-j (South Korea) Kim S-y | 21 | 21
2 | (China) Luo Y (China) Luo Y | 19 | 14

Semifinals
8 | (China) Zhao YL (China) Zhong QX | 21 | 21
(South Korea) Chae Y-j (South Korea) Kim S-y | 16 | 13

=== Finals ===
Semifinals
(Japan) Shizuka Matsuo (Japan) Mami Naito | 17 | 16
4 | (Denmark) Christinna Pedersen (Denmark) Kamilla Rytter Juhl | 21 | 21
8 | (China) Zhao Yunlei (China) Zhong Qianxin | 21 | 21
(South Korea) Chae Yoo-jung (South Korea) Kim So-young | 16 | 13

Final
4 | (Denmark) Christinna Pedersen (Denmark) Kamilla Rytter Juhl | 12 | 16
8 | (China) Zhao Yunlei (China) Zhong Qianxin | 21 | 21

== Mixed doubles ==
=== Seeds ===
1. (China) Zhang Nan / Zhao Yunlei (Final)
2. (China) Xu Chen / Ma Jin (Quarterfinals)
3. (Indonesia) Tantowi Ahmad / Liliyana Natsir (Quarterfinals)
4. (China) Liu Cheng / Bao Yixin (Quarterfinals)
5. (Denmark) Joachim Fischer Nielsen / Christinna Pedersen (Champion)
6. (China) Lu Kai / Huang Yaqiong (2nd round)
7. (England) Chris Adcock / Gabrielle Adcock (Quarterfinals)
8. (South Korea) Ko Sung-hyun / Kim Ha-na (Semifinals)

=== Top half ===
First round
1 | (China) Zhang N (China) Zhao YL | 21 | 23
(Hong Kong) Lee C H (Hong Kong) Chau H W | 13 | 21
(China) Wang YL (China) Luo Y | 16 | 18
(Malaysia) Chan P S (Malaysia) Goh L Y | 21 | 21
7 | (England) C Adcock (England) G Adcock | 21 | 21
(South Korea) Shin B-c (South Korea) Chae Y-j | 17 | 12
(Hong Kong) Chan Y L (Hong Kong) Tse Y S | 21 | 16 | 17
(Japan) K Hayakawa (Japan) M Matsutomo | 15 | 21 | 21
3 | (Indonesia) T Ahmad (Indonesia) L Natsir | 21 | 21
(Malaysia) Tan A Q (Malaysia) Lai P J | 17 | 17
(Indonesia) E Subaktiar (Indonesia) G E Widjaja | 19 | 23 | 13
(Chinese Taipei) Liao M-c (Chinese Taipei) Chen H-h | 21 | 21 | 21
8 | (South Korea) Ko S-h (South Korea) Kim H-n | 21 | 24
(Indonesia) R Widianto (Indonesia) R P Dili | 19 | 22
Q4 | (South Korea) Choi S-g (South Korea) Eom H-w | 19 | 18
(Indonesia) P Jordan (Indonesia) D Susanto | 21 | 21

Second round
1 | (China) Zhang N (China) Zhao YL | 21 | 21
(Malaysia) Chan P S (Malaysia) Goh L Y | 15 | 18
7 | (England) C Adcock (England) G Adcock | 11
(Japan) K Hayakawa (Japan) M Matsutomo | 7^{r}
3 | (Indonesia) T Ahmad (Indonesia) L Natsir | 21 | 21
(Chinese Taipei) Liao M-c (Chinese Taipei) Chen H-h | 17 | 11
8 | (South Korea) Ko S-h (South Korea) Kim H-n | 21 | 21
(Indonesia) P Jordan (Indonesia) D Susanto | 17 | 10

Quarterfinals
1 | (China) Zhang N (China) Zhao YL | 21 | 21
7 | (England) C Adcock (England) G Adcock | 12 | 13
3 | (Indonesia) T Ahmad (Indonesia) L Natsir | 16 | 21
8 | (South Korea) Ko S-h (South Korea) Kim H-n | 21 | 23

Semifinals
1 | (China) Zhang N (China) Zhao YL | 21 | 21
8 | (South Korea) Ko S-h (South Korea) Kim H-n | 18 | 17

=== Bottom half ===
First round
(South Korea) Lee Y-d (South Korea) Lee S-h | 21 | 21
(Indonesia) A Adistia (Indonesia) V Marissa | 8 | 13
Q3 | (Japan) A Koga (Japan) K Yonemoto | 14 | 11
5 | (Denmark) J Fischer Nielsen (Denmark) C Pedersen | 21 | 21
(Thailand) S Prakamol (Thailand) S Thoungthongkam | 24 | 21 | 21
(Netherlands) J Arends (Netherlands) S Piek | 26 | 16 | 14
(United States) P Chew (United States) J Subandhi | 10 | 9
4 | (China) Liu C (China) Bao YX | 21 | 21
(South Korea) Kim K-j (South Korea) Shin S-c | 24 | 21
Q1 | (Japan) K Kazuno (Japan) A Kurihara | 22 | 18
(Indonesia) M Kido (Indonesia) P Z Bernadeth | 13 | 12
6 | (China) Lu K (China) Huang YQ | 21 | 21
(Japan) K Sonoda (Japan) N Fukuman | 17 | 19
(Indonesia) R Alexander (Indonesia) M D Oktaviani | 21 | 21
Q2 | (South Korea) Yoo Y-s (South Korea) Chang Y-n | 21 | 19 | 20
2 | (China) Xu C (China) Ma J | 19 | 21 | 22

Second round
(South Korea) Lee Y-d (South Korea) Lee S-h | 23 | 16
5 | (Denmark) J Fischer Nielsen (Denmark) C Pedersen | 25 | 21
(Thailand) S Prakamol (Thailand) S Thoungthongkam | 8 | 13
4 | (China) Liu C (China) Bao YX | 21 | 21
(South Korea) Kim K-j (South Korea) Shin S-c | 21 | 21
6 | (China) Lu K (China) Huang YQ | 19 | 14
(Indonesia) R Alexander (Indonesia) M D Oktaviani | 17 | 14
2 | (China) Xu C (China) Ma J | 21 | 21

Quarterfinals
5 | (Denmark) J Fischer Nielsen (Denmark) C Pedersen | 21 | 21
4 | (China) Liu C (China) Bao YX | 16 | 12
(South Korea) Kim K-j (South Korea) Shin S-c | 21 | 21
2 | (China) Xu C (China) Ma J | 16 | 17

Semifinals
5 | (Denmark) J Fischer Nielsen (Denmark) C Pedersen | 21 | 21
(South Korea) Kim K-j (South Korea) Shin S-c | 19 | 16

=== Finals ===
Semifinals
1 | (China) Zhang Nan (China) Zhao Yunlei | 21 | 21
8 | (South Korea) Ko Sung-hyun (South Korea) Kim Ha-na | 18 | 17
5 | (Denmark) Joachim Fischer Nielsen (Denmark) Christinna Pedersen | 21 | 21
(South Korea) Kim Ki-jung (South Korea) Shin Seung-chan | 19 | 16

Final
1 | (China) Zhang Nan (China) Zhao Yunlei | 21 | 18 | 21
5 | (Denmark) Joachim Fischer Nielsen (Denmark) Christinna Pedersen | 17 | 21 | 23

| Preceded by 2014 Japan Super Series | Japan Open | Succeeded by 2016 Japan Super Series |
| Preceded by 2015 Indonesia Super Series Premier | BWF Super Series; 2015 BWF Season | Succeeded by 2015 Korea Open Super Series |
