= 2015 Japan Super Series – Qualification =

Qualification for 2015 Japan Super Series will be held on 8 September 2015.

== Men's Single ==
=== Seeds ===
1. (France) Brice Leverdez (withdrew)
2. (India) B. Sai Praneeth (Proceed to the main draw)
3. (South Korea) Lee Dong-keun
4. (Indonesia) Jonatan Christie

=== Qualifying draw ===
==== First qualifier ====
First Round
PFR	(Japan) Kanta Tsuneyama	22	21
(India) Anand Pawar	20	18
(Japan) Kazumasa Sakai	13	11
(Indonesia) Ihsan Maulana Mustofa	21	21

Qualifying Competition
PFR	(Japan) Kanta Tsuneyama	13	21	16
(Indonesia) Ihsan Maulana Mustofa	21	14	21

==== Second qualifier ====
First Round
4	(Indonesia) Jonatan Christie	22	22	21
(Japan) Kenta Nishimoto	24	20	19
(Chinese Taipei) Wang Tzu-wei	21	20	21
(Indonesia) Anthony Sinisuka Ginting	19	22	17

Qualifying Competition
4	(Indonesia) Jonatan Christie	19	21	14
(Chinese Taipei) Wang Tzu-wei	21	19	21

==== Third qualifier ====
First Round
(South Korea) Jeon Hyeok-jin	21	17	21
PFR	(Japan) Hashiru Shimono	15	21	15
(Japan) Kenichi Tago	12	21	18
3	(South Korea) Lee Dong-keun	21	12	21

Qualifying Competition
(South Korea) Jeon Hyeok-jin	21	21	19
3	(South Korea) Lee Dong-keun	23	14	21

==== Fourth qualifier ====
First Round
(Malaysia) Lee Chong Wei	21	21
(Scotland) Alistair Casey	3	3
(South Korea) Heo Kwang-hee	21	21
PFR	(Japan) Yosei Yamaguchi	10	18

Qualifying Competition
(Malaysia) Lee Chong Wei	21	21
(South Korea) Heo Kwang-hee	10	12

== Women's Single ==
=== Seeds ===
1. (United States) Iris Wang
2. (Chinese Taipei) Hsu Ya-ching
3. (Thailand) Nitchaon Jindapol
4. (Japan) Aya Ohori

=== Qualifying draw ===
==== First qualifier ====
First Round
1	(United States) Iris Wang
BYE
(Japan) Shiori Saito	18	22	11
(Japan) Kana Ito	21	20	21

Qualifying Competition
1	(United States) Iris Wang	19	19
(Japan) Kana Ito	21	21

==== Second qualifier ====
First Round
3	(Thailand) Nitchaon Jindapol	w	/	o
(Japan) Ayumi Mine
(Japan) Shizuka Uchida
(India) Lalita Dahiya	W	D	N

Qualifying Competition
(Japan) Ayumi Mine	21	21
(Japan) Shizuka Uchida	16	10

==== Third qualifier ====
First Round
(Indonesia) Lyanny Alessandra Mainaky	21	10	9
(Japan) Saena Kawakami	18	21	21
(Japan) Natsuki Nidaira	4^{r}
3	(Japan) Aya Ohori	11

Qualifying Competition
(Japan) Saena Kawakami	16	21	21
3	(Japan) Aya Ohori	21	14	16

==== Fourth qualifier ====
First Round
(Chinese Taipei) Chen Hsiao-huan	22	10	17
(Japan) Yuka Kusunose	20	21	21
(Japan) Moe Araki	21	21
2	(Chinese Taipei) Hsu Ya-ching	19	11

Qualifying Competition
(Japan) Yuka Kusunose	6	10
(Japan) Moe Araki	21	21

== Men's doubles ==
=== Seeds ===
1. (Thailand) Dechapol Puavaranukroh / (Thailand) Kittinupong Kedren
2. (Indonesia) Markis Kido / (Indonesia) Agripinna Rahmanto Putra
3. (Japan) Hiroyuki Saeki / (Japan) Ryota Taohata
4. (Chinese Taipei) Liao Min-chun / (Chinese Taipei) Tseng Min-hao

=== Qualifying draw ===
==== First qualifier ====
First Round
1	(Thailand) Dechapol Puavaranukroh (Thailand) Kittinupong Kedren	21	13	22
(Japan) Yuya Komatsuzaki (Japan) Hiroki Takeuchi	18	21	20
(Japan) Shintaro Ikeda (Japan) Kazuaki Oshima	21	21
(Japan) Shuto Morioka (Japan) Keita Ogawa	13	16

Qualifying Competition
1	(Thailand) Dechapol Puavaranukroh (Thailand) Kittinupong Kedren	16	21	21
(Japan) Shintaro Ikeda (Japan) Kazuaki Oshima	21	10	14

==== Second qualifier ====
First Round
3	(Japan) Hiroyuki Saeki (Japan) Ryota Taohata	21	21
(Japan) Shohei Hoshino (Japan) Izumi Okoshi	9	19
(Hong Kong) Chan Yun Lung (Hong Kong) Lee Chun Hei	13	16
(Japan) Taiki Shimada (Japan) Yoshinori Takeuchi	21	21

Qualifying Competition
3	(Japan) Hiroyuki Saeki (Japan) Ryota Taohata	21	16	21
(Japan) Taiki Shimada (Japan) Yoshinori Takeuchi	12	21	18

==== Third qualifier ====
First Round
(South Korea) Choi Sol-gyu (South Korea) Kim Jae-hwan	17	14
(Japan) Keiichiro Matsui (Japan) Koshun Miura	21	21
(Japan) Takatoshi Kurose (Japan) Ryota Sando	21	16	16
4	(Chinese Taipei) Liao Min-chun (Chinese Taipei) Tseng Min-hao	16	21	21

Qualifying Competition
(Japan) Keiichiro Matsui (Japan) Koshun Miura	16	10
4	(Chinese Taipei) Liao Min-chun (Chinese Taipei) Tseng Min-hao	21	21

==== Fourth qualifier ====
First Round
(Malaysia) Lee Yan Sheng (Malaysia) Lin Woon Fui	8^{r}
(Japan) Kazuya Itani (Japan) Tomoya Takashina	20
(Japan) Akira Koga (Japan) Taichi Saito	12	19
2	(Indonesia) Markis Kido (Indonesia) Agripinna Rahmanto Putra	21	21

Qualifying Competition
(Japan) Kazuya Itani (Japan) Tomoya Takashina	10	14
2	(Indonesia) Markis Kido (Indonesia) Agripinna Rahmanto Putra	21	21

== Women's doubles ==
=== Seeds ===
1. (Japan) Rie Eto / (Japan) Aoi Matsuda (Proceed to the main draw)
2. (Japan) Mayu Matsumoto / (Japan) Wakana Nagahara (Proceed to the main draw)
3. (Thailand) Chayanit Chaladchalam / (Thailand) Phataimas Muenwong
4. (Japan) Arisa Higashino / (Japan) Chisato Hoshi

=== Qualifying draw ===
==== First qualifier ====
First Round
(South Korea) Jung Kyung-eun (South Korea) Shin Seung-chan
BYE
(Indonesia) Della Destiara Haris (Indonesia) Rizki Amelia Pradipta	11	21	13
(Indonesia) Pia Zebadiah Bernadet (Indonesia) Aprilsasi Putri Lejarsar Variella	21	15	21

Qualifying Competition
(South Korea) Jung Kyung-eun (South Korea) Shin Seung-chan	21	21
(Indonesia) Pia Zebadiah Bernadet (Indonesia) Aprilsasi Putri Lejarsar Variella	13	8

==== Second qualifier ====
First Round
3	(Thailand) Chayanit Chaladchalam (Thailand) Phataimas Muenwong	21	21
(Japan) Atsuko Koike (Japan) Midori Sakurai	19	16
BYE
(Japan) Mirai Shinoda (Japan) Natsumi Uratani

Qualifying Competition
3	(Thailand) Chayanit Chaladchalam (Thailand) Phataimas Muenwong	6	21	21
(Japan) Mirai Shinoda (Japan) Natsumi Uratani	21	18	11

==== Third qualifier ====
First Round
BYE
(Japan) Rira Kawashima (Japan) Saori Ozaki
(Japan) Asumi Kugo (Japan) Megumi Yokoyama	21	21
4	(Japan) Arisa Higashino (Japan) Chisato Hoshi	16	16

Qualifying Competition
(Japan) Rira Kawashima (Japan) Saori Ozaki	19	23	21
(Japan) Asumi Kugo (Japan) Megumi Yokoyama	21	21	8

==== Fourth qualifier ====
First Round
(South Korea) Chang Ye-na (South Korea) Lee So-hee	21	18	23
(Japan) Nami Matsuyama (Japan) Chiharu Shida	9	21	21
(Japan) Misato Aratama (Japan) Akane Watanabe
2	(Japan) Mayu Matsumoto (Japan) Wakana Nagahara	P	M	D

Qualifying Competition
(South Korea) Chang Ye-na (South Korea) Lee So-hee	21	21
(Japan) Misato Aratama (Japan) Akane Watanabe	11	6

== Mixed doubles ==
=== Seeds ===
1. (India) Tarun Kona / (India) N. Sikki Reddy
2. (South Korea) Choi Sol-gyu / (South Korea) Eom Hye-won
3. (Japan) Yuki Kaneko / (Japan) Shizuka Matsuo
4. (Japan) Akira Koga / (Japan) Koharu Yonemoto

=== Qualifying draw ===
==== First qualifier ====
First Round
1	(India) Tarun Kona (India) N. Sikki Reddy	9	21	19
(Japan) Yuta Watanabe (Japan) Arisa Higashino	21	13	21
(Indonesia) Yehezkiel Fritz Mainaky (Indonesia) Lyanny Alessandra Mainaky	7	10
(Japan) Kenta Kazuno (Japan) Ayane Kurihara	21	21

Qualifying Competition
(Japan) Yuta Watanabe (Japan) Arisa Higashino	17	15
(Japan) Kenta Kazuno (Japan) Ayane Kurihara	21	21

==== Second qualifier ====
First Round
3	(Japan) Yuki Kaneko (Japan) Shizuka Matsuo	21	14	21
(Japan) Shuto Morioka (Japan) Chiharu Shida	9	21	11
(South Korea) Yoo Yeon-seong (South Korea) Chang Ye-na	21	21
(Japan) Tomoya Takashina (Japan) Rie Eto	13	12

Qualifying Competition
3	(Japan) Yuki Kaneko (Japan) Shizuka Matsuo	15	15
(South Korea) Yoo Yeon-seong (South Korea) Chang Ye-na	21	21

==== Third qualifier ====
First Round
(Japan) Yugo Kobayashi (Japan) Yuki Fukushima	21	21
(South Korea) Kim Jae-hwan (South Korea) Kim So-yeong	12	17
PFR	(Japan) Hikaru Komachiya (Japan) Kaede Kameda	8	21
4	(Japan) Akira Koga (Japan) Koharu Yonemoto	21	23

Qualifying Competition
(Japan) Yugo Kobayashi (Japan) Yuki Fukushima	18	19
4	(Japan) Akira Koga (Japan) Koharu Yonemoto	21	21

==== Fourth qualifier ====
First Round
(Indonesia) Agripina Prima Rahmanto Putra (Indonesia) Aprilsasi Putri Lejarsar Variella	17	21	21
(Japan) Koshun Miura (Japan) Natsumi Uratani	21	15	18
(Japan) Daisuke Suzuki (Japan) Midori Sakurai	15	18
2	(South Korea) Choi Sol-gyu (South Korea) Eom Hye-won	21	21

Qualifying Competition
(Indonesia) Agripinna Prima Rahmanto Putra (Indonesia) Aprilsasi Putri Lejarsar Variella	7	15
2	(South Korea) Choi Sol-gyu (South Korea) Eom Hye-won	21	21
