= 2016 BWF World Junior Championships – Girls' singles =

The girls' singles tournament of the 2016 BWF World Junior Championships is held on November 8–13. The defending champion of the last edition is Goh Jin Wei from Malaysia.

== Seeded ==
1. (Malaysia) Goh Jin Wei (fifth round)
2. (China) Chen Yufei (champion)
3. (Thailand) Pornpawee Chochuwong (final)
4. (Japan) Natsuki Nidaira (fifth round)
5. (South Korea) Kim Ga-eun (semi-final)
6. (Singapore) Yeo Jia Min (quarter-final)
7. (Indonesia) Gregoria Mariska Tunjung (fifth round)
8. (Denmark) Julie Dawall Jakobsen (fourth round)
9. (China) Gao Fangjie (quarter-final)
10. (Australia) Joy Lai (third round)
11. (Spain) Clara Azurmendi (fourth round)
12. (Thailand) Pattarasuda Chaiwan (fifth round)
13. (Malaysia) Thinaah Muralitharan (fifth round)
14. (Russia) Anastasiia Semenova (fourth round)
15. (Hungary) Reka Madarasz (third round)
16. (Australia) Tiffany Ho (quarter-final)

== Draw ==
=== Finals ===
Fifth round
1	(Malaysia) Goh Jin Wei	21	16	16
(Japan) Natsuki Oie	10	21	21
7	(Indonesia) Gregoria Mariska Tunjung	18	14
9	(China) Gao Fangjie	21	21
3	(Thailand) Pornpawee Chochuwong	21	21
(France) Léonice Huet	10	11
6	(Singapore) Yeo Jia Min	21	21
(United States) Jamie Hsu	13	9
12	(Thailand) Pattarasuda Chaiwan	17	24
5	(South Korea) Kim Ga-eun	21	26
(China) Cai Yanyan	21	21
4	(Japan) Natsuki Nidaira	11	17
(Thailand) Chasinee Korepap	11	7
(China) Han Yue	21	21
(India) Shikha Gautam	13	10
2	(China) Chen Yufei	21	21

Quarterfinals
(Japan) Natsuki Oie	22	21
9	(China) Gao Fangjie	20	18
3	(Thailand) Pornpawee Chochuwong	21	21
6	(Singapore) Yeo Jia Min	11	11
5	(South Korea) Kim Ga-eun	21	21
(China) Cai Yanyan	17	11
(China) Han Yue	16	15
2	(China) Chen Yufei	21	21

Semifinals
(Japan) Natsuki Oie	25	19
3	(Thailand) Pornpawee Chochuwong	27	21
5	(South Korea) Kim Ga-eun	12	17
2	(China) Chen Yufei	21	21

Finals
3	(Thailand) Pornpawee Chochuwong	14	17
2	(China) Chen Yufei	21	21

=== Top Half ===
==== Section 1 ====
First round
(Peru) F Saponara Rivva	21	14	21
(Latvia) U Berga	13	21	17

Second round
1	(Malaysia) Goh J W	21	21
(Germany) M Wilson	9	11
(Sweden) E Soderstrom	18	21	21
(New Zealand) G Galvez	21	14	11
(Bulgaria) M Delcheva	21	21
(Spain) N Diaz	18	16
(Estonia) H Piho	17	21	23
(Peru) F Saponara Rivva	21	17	21

Third round
1	(Malaysia) Goh J W	21	21
(Sweden) E Soderstrom	8	4
(Bulgaria) M Delcheva	15	21	21
(Estonia) H Piho	21	7	4

Fourth round
1	(Malaysia) Goh J W	21	21
(Bulgaria) M Delcheva	11	14

==== Section 2 ====
First round
(Chinese Taipei) Lin H-t	21	21
(Costa Rica) A L R Martinez Geva	6	2

Second round
15	(Hungary) R Madarasz	21	21
(Algeria) L Marzi	7	8
(Ukraine) M Ilyinskaya	17	17
(India) A Kashyap	21	21
(Japan) N Oie	21	21
(Macau) Gong X X	4	9
(Germany) S S Küspert	7	10
(Chinese Taipei) Lin H-t	21	21

Third round
15	(Hungary) R Madarasz	12	15
(India) A Kashyap	21	21
(Japan) N Oie	21	21
(Chinese Taipei) Lin H-t	17	17

Fourth round
(India) A Kashyap	15	7
(Japan) N Oie	21	21

==== Section 3 ====
First round
(Portugal) M Paiva	21	21
(Mongolia) O Amartaivan	12	4

Second round
7	(Indonesia) G M Tunjung	21	21
(Lithuania) G Paskeviciute	2	2
(Vietnam) Tran T P T	13	21	10
(Netherlands) D Jille	21	19	21
(Finland) M Krzywacki	21	21
(Romania) M Ilie	18	14
(Macau) Kuan C L	21	23
(Portugal) M Paiva	18	21

Third round
7	(Indonesia) G M Tunjung	21	21
(Netherlands) D Jille	13	19
(Finland) M Krzywacki	21	21
(Macau) Kuan C L	15	17

Quarter Final
7	(Indonesia) G M Tunjung	21	21
(Finland) M Krzywacki	9	12

==== Section 4 ====
First round
(Mexico) A Quiñones	9	6
(England) A Holden	21	21
(Norway) M Christensen	4	7
(Japan) S Ebihara	21	21

Second round
9	(China) Gao FJ	21	21
(Denmark) I A Andersen	6	9
(England) G King	19	12
(Slovenia) N Arih	21	21
(Hong Kong) Leung Y Y	21	21
(Sri Lanka) I Kuruppu	14	6
(England) A Holden	15	13
(Japan) S Ebihara	21	21

Third round
9	(China) Gao FJ	21	21
(Slovenia) N Arih	10	8
(Hong Kong) Leung Y Y	12	16
(Japan) S Ebihara	21	21

Quarter Final
9	(China) Gao FJ	21	21
(Japan) S Ebihara	11	11

==== Section 5 ====
First round
(Iceland) T Eylands	3	2
(Japan) A Takahashi	21	21

Second round
3	(Thailand) P Chochuwong	21	21
(Russia) O Rogova	7	8
(South Africa) Z van der Merwe	8	8
(Brazil) J Viana	21	21
(Sri Lanka) B A Galagamage	21	20	21
(Italy) S Garino	15	22	9
(Slovakia) T Prostinakova	4	9
(Japan) A Takahashi	21	21

Third round
3	(Thailand) P Chochuwong	21	21
(Brazil) J Viana	14	10
(Sri Lanka) B A Galagamage	6	6
(Japan) A Takahashi	21	21

Quarter Final
3	(Thailand) P Chochuwong	21	21
(Japan) A Takahashi	11	19

==== Section 6 ====
First round
(Spain) S Penalver	19	22	24
(Malaysia) P Tan	21	20	22
(Romania) A Olariu	15	15
(Hong Kong) Yeung S Y	21	21

Second round
16	(Australia) T Ho	21	21
(Czech Republic) B Ausbergerova	12	14
(Poland) W Dabczynska	21	21
(Australia) V He	15	10
(Czech Republic) T Švábíková	9	22
(France) L Huet	21	24
(Spain) S Penalver	18	21	21
(Hong Kong) Yeung S Y	21	16	9

Third round
16	(Australia) T Ho	21	21
(Poland) W Dabczynska	16	11
(France) L Huet	21	21
(Spain) S Penalver	16	11

Quarter Final
16	(Australia) T Ho	7	16
(France) L Huet	21	21

==== Section 7 ====
First round
(New Zealand) S Fu	11	21	21
(Finland) I Suutarinen	21	16	13

Second round
6	(Singapore) Yeo J M	21	21
(Portugal) M Chang	9	13
(Sweden) J Magnusson	16	9
(South Korea) Sim Y-j	21	21
(Moldova) E-A Diordiev	14	15
(Iran) S Abedkhojasteh	21	21
(Estonia) M A Karjus	18	17
(New Zealand) S Fu	21	21

Third round
6	(Singapore) Yeo J M	24	21
(South Korea) Sim Y-j	22	13
(Iran) S Abedkhojasteh	22	21	21
(New Zealand) S Fu	24	17	15

Quarter Final
6	(Singapore) Yeo J M	21	21
(Iran) S Abedkhojasteh	3	8

==== Section 8 ====
First round
(Peru) M Vasquez	9	15
(Turkey) A Demirbag	21	21
(Canada) Q Ouyang	21	21
(France) M Lambert	17	19

Second round
14	(Russia) A Semenova	21	18	21
(Belgium) C Lassaux	19	21	12
(Georgia (country)) M Khachaturyan	4	8
(Belarus) J Bitsoukova	21	21
(Scotland) T Woods	12	17
(United States) J Hsu	21	21
(Turkey) A Demirbag	16	15
(Canada) Q Ouyang	21	21

Third round
14	(Russia) A Semenova	21	21
(Belarus) J Bitsoukova	12	9
(United States) J Hsu	21	21
(Canada) Q Ouyang	12	17

Fourth round
14	(Russia) A Semenova	14	10
(United States) J Hsu	21	21

=== Bottom Half ===
==== Section 9 ====
First round
(Iceland) A K Jonsdottir	20	14
(Norway) V Ellingsen	21	21
(Finland) P Lindberg	21	21
(Algeria) S Ibrahim	11	19

Second round
(Norway) V Ellingsen	14	16
(Finland) P Lindberg	21	21
(France) Y Hoyaux	21	13	22
(Denmark) M Cramer	12	21	20
(Indonesia) G M Moningka	21	21
(Germany) Y Li	18	13
(Sweden) E Karlsson	21	9	18
12	(Thailand) P Chaiwan	16	21	21

Third round
(Finland) P Lindberg	5	7
(France) Y Hoyaux	21	21
(Indonesia) G M Moningka	13	13
12	(Thailand) P Chaiwan	21	21

Fourth round
(France) Y Hoyaux	8	18
12	(Thailand) P Chaiwan	21	21

==== Section 10 ====
First round
(Bulgaria) M Neycheva	21	21
(Lithuania) A Blandyte	1	12

Second round
(Bulgaria) M Neycheva	21	21
(South Africa) C Haasbroek	5	12
(India) K Kanwal	21	21
(South Africa) T Jacobs	4	6
(Canada) G Chan	21	17	19
(Netherlands) M Baan	13	21	21
(Canada) K Ho-shue	8	9
5	(South Korea) Kim G-e	21	21

Third round
(Bulgaria) M Neycheva	21	17	16
(India) K Kanwal	11	21	21
(Netherlands) M Baan	10	12
5	(South Korea) Kim G-e	21	21

Fourth round
(India) K Kanwal	11	7
5	(South Korea) Kim G-e	21	21

==== Section 11 ====
First round
(Chinese Taipei) Liang T-y	18	21	21
(England) Ngan M L	21	18	17
(Bulgaria) V Sakadjiiska	14	19
(Slovenia) N Stovanje	21	21

Second round
(Chinese Taipei) Liang T-y	21	21
(Slovenia) N Stovanje	9	9
(Chinese Taipei) Jhou S-j	21	21
(Austria) L Lencevica	9	8
(China) Cai YY	21	21
(Russia) L Minadze	10	5
(Indonesia) A O Winata	18	21	15
13	(Malaysia) T Muralitharan	21	12	21

Third round
(Chinese Taipei) Liang T-y	21	21
(Chinese Taipei) Jhou S-j	15	15
(China) Cai YY	21	21
13	(Malaysia) T Muralitharan	7	19

Fourth round
(Chinese Taipei) Liang T-y	21	14	17
(China) Cai YY	18	21	21

==== Section 12 ====
First round
(Kenya) S Patel	5	4
(Hungary) A Karsai	21	21

Second round
(Hungary) A Karsai	21	13	21
(Peru) P L Torre Regal	11	21	10
(Sri Lanka) H C Wijayarathne	13	17
(Slovenia) E Cizelj	21	21
(United States) M Chen	21	21
(Mongolia) K Darkhanbaatar	3	7
(Costa Rica) L Villalobos	5	5
4	(Japan) N Nidaira	21	21

Third round
(Hungary) A Karsai	15	21	11
(Slovenia) E Cizelj	21	19	21
(United States) M Chen	12	10
4	(Japan) N Nidaira	21	21

Fourth round
(Slovenia) E Cizelj	5	8
4	(Japan) N Nidaira	21	21

==== Section 13 ====
First round
(Georgia (country)) B Teona	8	6
(Scotland) C Torrance	21	21
(Armenia) M Stepanyan	8	5
(Chinese Taipei) Hu L-f	21	21

Second round
(Scotland) C Torrance	9	18
(Chinese Taipei) Hu L-f	21	21
(Thailand) C Korepap	18	21	21
(United States) J Gai	21	18	19
(Algeria) H Bouksani	21	20	15
(Moldova) V Gynga	19	22	21
(New Zealand) T Otene	7	8
11	(Spain) C Azurmendi	21	21

Third round
(Chinese Taipei) Hu L-f	18	21	14
(Thailand) C Korepap	21	14	21
(Moldova) V Gynga	13	6
11	(Spain) C Azurmendi	21	21

Fourth round
(Thailand) C Korepap	18	21	21
11	(Spain) C Azurmendi	21	18	18

==== Section 14 ====
First round
(Belgium) J De Langhe	21	21
(Belarus) M Viarbitskaya	17	19

Second round
(Belgium) J De Langhe	7	4
(China) Han Y	21	21
(Ukraine) V Rudakova	17	6
(Czech Republic) M Svetnickova	21	21
(Lithuania) E Berzanskyte	4	5
(South Korea) Jeong N-e	21	21
(Hungary) V Sandorhazi	9	4
8	(Denmark) J Dawall Jakobsen	21	21

Third round
(China) Han Y	21	21
(Czech Republic) M Svetnickova	3	12
(South Korea) Jeong N-e
8	(Denmark) J Dawall Jakobsen	w	/	o

Fourth round
(China) Han Y	26	21	21
8	(Denmark) J Dawall Jakobsen	28	5	17

==== Section 15 ====
First round
(Norway) E Hamang	21	13	21
(Ukraine) A Prozorova	19	21	19
(Thailand) N Aimsaard	21	21
(Switzerland) J Stadelmann	18	18

Second round
(Norway) E Hamang	9	4
(Thailand) N Aimsaard	21	21
(Denmark) L Christophersen	21	21
(Slovakia) M Tarcalova	11	7
(India) S Gautam	21	21
(Macau) Ng W C	10	9
(Turkey) K İnal	18	16
10	(Australia) J Lai	21	21

Third round
(Thailand) N Aimsaard	21	14	21
(Denmark) L Christophersen	15	21	18
(India) S Gautam	21	18	21
10	(Australia) J Lai	19	21	15

Fourth round
(Thailand) N Aimsaard	11	23
(India) S Gautam	21	25

==== Section 16 ====
First round
(Romania) I Grecea	21	21
(Armenia) M Nikoyan	8	11

Second round
(Romania) I Grecea	17	23	18
(Estonia) K Maran	21	21	21
(Mexico) N Marquez	4	8
(Indonesia) D V Putri	21	21
(Singapore) N I Khan	21	21
(Portugal) M Leite	15	16
(Romania) M A Dutu	7	3
2	(China) Chen YF	21	21

Third round
(Estonia) K Maran	9	6
(Indonesia) D V Putri	21	21
(Singapore) N I Khan	10	4
2	(China) Chen YF	21	21

Fourth round
(Indonesia) D V Putri	12	14
2	(China) Chen YF	21	21
