= Hiroki Okamura =

Japanese badminton player (born 1998)

- Okamura at the 2026 Canada Open

Personal information
- Native name: 岡村 洋輝
- Born: 6 December 1998 (age 27) Obihiro, Hokkaido, Japan
- Height: 177 cm (5 ft 10 in)
- Weight: 74 kg (163 lb)

Sport
- Country: Japan
- Sport: Badminton
- Handedness: Right
- Coached by: Hiroyuki Endo

Men's & mixed doubles
- Highest ranking: 18 (MD with Kenya Mitsuhashi, 27 August 2024); 99 (XD with Naru Shinoya, 29 March 2018)
- Current ranking: 24 (MD with Kyohei Yamashita, 17 November 2026)
- BWF profile
Medal record
Men's badminton
Representing Japan
Asia Mixed Team Championships
Bronze medal – third place	2025 Qingdao	Mixed team
Asia Team Championships
Bronze medal – third place	2024 Selangor	Men's team
World Junior Championships
Bronze medal – third place	2016 Bilbao	Mixed team
Asian Junior Championships
Bronze medal – third place	2016 Bangkok	Mixed team

Hiroki Okamura (岡村 洋輝, Okamura Hiroki; born 6 December 1998) is a Japanese badminton player. He is a member of the Japanese national team and is affiliated with the BIPROGY team. Competing primarily in men's doubles, Okamura secured his first BWF World Tour Super 300 title at the 2026 U.S. Open alongside Kyohei Yamashita. He previously won two World Tour Super 100 titles partnering with Kenya Mitsuhashi. In team competitions, Okamura has won bronze medals representing Japan at the 2024 Asia Team Championships and the 2025 Asia Mixed Team Championships. He reached a career-high men's doubles world ranking of No. 18 in August 2024.

== Early career ==
Okamura began competing in international junior events in 2016, partnering with Masayuki Onodera in boys' doubles and with Nami Matsuyama and Sayaka Hobara in mixed doubles. At the Dutch Junior that year, Okamura and Onodera won the boys' doubles title, defeating compatriots Kyohei Yamashita and Naoki Yamazawa in three games. Okamura also won the mixed doubles at the same tournament with Matsuyama. At the German Junior, Okamura and Onodera reached the boys' doubles final but lost to Yamashita and Yamazawa, and Okamura and Hobara finished as runners-up in the mixed doubles. Later in 2016, Okamura and Onodera won the boys' doubles title at the India Junior International, defeating India's Krishna Prasad Garaga and Dhruv Kapila.

Okamura was part of the Japanese team that won bronze medals at both the 2016 World Junior Championships in Bilbao and the 2016 Asian Junior Championships in Bangkok in the mixed team event.

== Career ==
=== 2017–2019 ===
In 2017, Okamura won the mixed doubles title at the Malaysia International with Naru Shinoya. The following year, he partnered with Masayuki Onodera in men's doubles at the Sydney International, where they won the title with a straight-games victory over Singapore's Danny Bawa Chrisnanta and Terry Hee.

In 2019, Okamura and Onodera reached the final of the Canada Open, a BWF World Tour Super 100 event, but lost to Denmark's Mathias Boe and Mads Conrad-Petersen in straight games.

=== 2022–2023 ===
Okamura returned to the Indonesia International in 2022 with Onodera, where they finished as runners-up to Indonesia's Rahmat Hidayat and Pramudya Kusumawardana.

From 2023, Okamura began a new men's doubles partnership with Kenya Mitsuhashi. In September, the pair won the Super 100 Vietnam Open title, defeating Indonesia's Hardianto and Ade Yusuf Santoso. In October, they won the Indonesia International, overcoming South Korea's Ki Dong-ju and Kim Jae-hwan in three games. Later that month, they captured the Indonesia Masters Super 100 title with a straight-games win over Malaysia's Choong Hon Jian and Muhammad Haikal. In November, Okamura and Mitsuhashi reached the quarterfinals of the Japan Masters (Super 500), after defeating Mohammad Ahsan and Hendra Setiawan in the first round and reigning world champions Kang Min-hyuk and Seo Seung-jae in the second round, both in straight games. They lost in the quarterfinals to China's He Jiting and Ren Xiangyu, who went on to win the tournament.

=== 2024–2026 ===
Okamura (right) and Kyohei Yamashita, the 2026 Canada Open men's doubles champions.

Okamura was part of the Japanese teams that claimed bronze medals at the 2024 Asia Team Championships in Selangor and the 2025 Asia Mixed Team Championships in Qingdao. He and Mitsuhashi achieved a career-high men's doubles ranking of 18 on 27 August 2024.

In 2026, Okamura formed a new men's doubles partnership with Kyohei Yamashita. The pair made their debut at the Swiss Open in March, reaching the second round before losing to Satwiksairaj Rankireddy and Chirag Shetty of India. Later that month, they finished as runners-up at the Super 300 Orléans Masters. In June, Okamura secured the first Super 300 title of his career when he and Yamashita won the U.S. Open, defeating reigning European champions Ben Lane and Sean Vendy in the semifinals before beating Chen Zhi-ray and Lin Yu-chieh in the final. They followed this with a second consecutive title at the Super 300 Canada Open in July, where they defeated the Danish pair Christian Faust Kjær and Rasmus Kjær.

At the Japan Masters, Okamura and Yamashita defeated second seeds Fajar Alfian and Muhammad Shohibul Fikri in the first round.

== Personal life ==
Okamura married on 23 February 2026.

== Achievements ==
=== BWF World Tour (4 titles, 2 runners-up) ===
The BWF World Tour, which was announced on 19 March 2017 and implemented in 2018, is a series of elite badminton tournaments sanctioned by the Badminton World Federation (BWF). The BWF World Tour is divided into levels of World Tour Finals, Super 1000, Super 750, Super 500, Super 300 (part of the HSBC World Tour), and the BWF Tour Super 100.

Men's doubles
Year	Tournament	Level	Partner	Opponent	Score	Result	Ref.
2019	Canada Open	Super 100	(Japan) Masayuki Onodera	(Denmark) Mathias Boe (Denmark) Mads Conrad-Petersen	12–21, 18–21	(silver) Runner-up	
2023	Vietnam Open	Super 100	(Japan) Kenya Mitsuhashi	(Indonesia) Hardianto (Indonesia) Ade Yusuf Santoso	21–19, 21–19	(gold) Winner	
2023 (II)	Indonesia Masters	Super 100	(Japan) Kenya Mitsuhashi	(Malaysia) Choong Hon Jian (Malaysia) Muhammad Haikal	21–16, 21–18	(gold) Winner	
2026	Orléans Masters	Super 300	(Japan) Kyohei Yamashita	(China) Hu Keyuan (China) Lin Xiangyi	19–21, 14–21	(silver) Runner-up	
2026	U.S. Open	Super 300	(Japan) Kyohei Yamashita	(Chinese Taipei) Chen Zhi-ray (Chinese Taipei) Lin Yu-chieh	21–18, 16–21, 21–16	(gold) Winner	
2026	Canada Open	Super 300	(Japan) Kyohei Yamashita	(Denmark) Christian Faust Kjær (Denmark) Rasmus Kjær	13–21, 21–10, 21–17	(gold) Winner	

=== BWF International Challenge/Series (3 titles, 1 runner-up) ===
Men's doubles
Year	Tournament	Partner	Opponent	Score	Result	Ref.
2018	Sydney International	(Japan) Masayuki Onodera	(Singapore) Danny Bawa Chrisnanta (Singapore) Terry Hee	21–6, 21–11	(gold) Winner	
2022 (II)	Indonesia International	(Japan) Masayuki Onodera	(Indonesia) Rahmat Hidayat (Indonesia) Pramudya Kusumawardana	21–23, 21–16, 15–21	(silver) Runner-up	
2023 (II)	Indonesia International	(Japan) Kenya Mitsuhashi	(South Korea) Ki Dong-ju (South Korea) Kim Jae-hwan	20–22, 21–16, 21–8	(gold) Winner	

Mixed doubles
Year	Tournament	Partner	Opponent	Score	Result	Ref.
2017	Malaysia International	(Japan) Naru Shinoya	(Malaysia) Yogendran Krishnan (India) Prajakta Sawant	21–10, 24–22	(gold) Winner	

BWF International Challenge tournament
BWF International Series tournament

=== BWF Junior International (4 titles, 2 runners-up) ===
Boys' doubles
Year	Tournament	Partner	Opponent	Score	Result	Ref.
2016	Dutch Junior	(Japan) Masayuki Onodera	(Japan) Kyohei Yamashita (Japan) Naoki Yamazawa	17–21, 21–11, 22–20	(gold) Winner	
2016	German Junior	(Japan) Masayuki Onodera	(Japan) Kyohei Yamashita (Japan) Naoki Yamazawa	14–21, 19–21	(silver) Runner-up	
2016	India Junior International	(Japan) Masayuki Onodera	(India) Krishna Prasad Garaga (India) Dhruv Kapila	11–5, 12–14, 11–9, 13–11	(gold) Winner	

Mixed doubles
Year	Tournament	Partner	Opponent	Score	Result	Ref.
2016	Dutch Junior	(Japan) Nami Matsuyama	(Japan) Naoki Yamazawa (Japan) Sayaka Hobara	21–16, 21–19	(gold) Winner	
2016	German Junior	(Japan) Sayaka Hobara	(Japan) Naoki Yamazawa (Japan) Nami Matsuyama	22–20, 14–21, 11–21	(silver) Runner-up	
2016	India Junior International	(Japan) Nami Matsuyama	(Malaysia) Chen Tang Jie (Malaysia) Tew Jia Jia	8–11, 8–11, 11–6, 13–11, 11–4	(gold) Winner	

BWF Junior International Grand Prix tournament
