= Masayuki Onodera =

Japanese badminton player (born 1998)

Personal information
- Born: 16 September 1998 (age 28) Nishitōkyō, Tokyo, Japan
- Height: 1.69 m (5 ft 7 in)
- Weight: 66 kg (146 lb)

Sport
- Country: Japan
- Sport: Badminton
- Handedness: Right
- Retired: 31 March 2026

Men's doubles
- Highest ranking: 33 (with Hiroki Okamura, 20 December 2022)
- BWF profile
Medal record
Men's badminton
Representing Japan
World Junior Championships
Bronze medal – third place	2016 Bilbao	Mixed team
Asian Junior Championships
Bronze medal – third place	2015 Bangkok	Mixed team
Bronze medal – third place	2016 Bangkok	Mixed team

Masayuki Onodera (小野寺 雅之, Onodera Masayuki; born 16 September 1998) is a former Japanese badminton player who competed in men's doubles. He was affiliated with the BIPROGY team until his retirement in March 2026. His junior career was highlighted by three mixed team bronze medals: one at the 2016 World Junior Championships and two at the Asian Junior Championships in 2015 and 2016. With partner Hiroki Okamura, he achieved a career-high world ranking of No. 33. Their best BWF World Tour result was a runner-up finish at the 2019 Canada Open Super 100. Onodera has won two international titles on the BWF International Challenge/Series circuit: the 2018 Sydney International with Okamura and the 2023 Malaysia International with Takuto Inoue.

== Career ==
=== Early career ===
Onodera attended Kodaira Daini Junior High School and Saitama Sakae High School. He won three bronze medals with the Japanese mixed team: at the 2015 Asian Junior Championships, and at both the 2016 World and Asian Junior Championships. In 2016, partnering with Hiroki Okamura in boys' doubles, he won titles at the Dutch Juniors and the India Junior International. The pair also finished as runners-up at the German Junior. That same year, Onodera was the runner-up in both singles and doubles at the 2016 National High School Championships (Inter-High).

After high school, Onodera attended Waseda University, majoring in sport sciences and competing for its badminton team. He enrolled with the goal of obtaining a teaching license, inspired by his parents who were teachers. As a freshman in 2017, he helped the Waseda team win the All Japan Student Championships (Inter-Collegiate), the university's first national team title in 24 years. The following year, he was part of the team's successful title defense and also won the men's doubles title with partner Takuma Obayashi. Onodera graduated from Waseda University in March 2021.

=== Senior career ===
Onodera debuted in senior international tournaments while still a university student. Upon graduating in April 2021, he joined the BIPROGY badminton team, formerly known as Nihon Unisys. From 2017 to 2022, he partnered with Hiroki Okamura. The duo won their first senior international title at the 2018 Sydney International and were runners-up at the 2019 Canada Open Super 100, where they were defeated by Mathias Boe and Mads Conrad-Petersen. In 2022, the pair were runners-up at the Indonesia International and reached the semifinals at the Canada Open, Korea Masters, and Indonesia Masters Super 100. During the Korea Masters, they notably defeated the reigning All England Open Champions, Bagas Maulana and Muhammad Shohibul Fikri. The pair also competed in the 2021 and 2022 World Championships, reaching the second round in both editions.

In 2023, Onodera formed a new partnership with Takuto Inoue, winning the Malaysia International and securing a third-place finish at the All Japan Championships. He subsequently teamed up with Daigo Tanioka, reaching the semifinals of the 2024 Guwahati Masters and finished as a runner-up at both the 2025 Thailand International and the 2025 Bendigo International.

=== Retirement and coaching ===
On 1 April 2026, BIPROGY announced Onodera's retirement from competitive badminton, which took effect on 31 March 2026. Following his retirement, he remained with the BIPROGY, transitioning into a role as a sparring coach for the women's team.

== Achievements ==
=== BWF World Tour (1 runner-up) ===
The BWF World Tour, which was announced on 19 March 2017 and implemented in 2018, is a series of elite badminton tournaments sanctioned by the Badminton World Federation (BWF). The BWF World Tour is divided into levels of World Tour Finals, Super 1000, Super 750, Super 500, Super 300 (part of the HSBC World Tour), and the BWF Tour Super 100.

Men's doubles
Year	Tournament	Level	Partner	Opponent	Score	Result	Ref.
2019	Canada Open	Super 100	(Japan) Hiroki Okamura	(Denmark) Mathias Boe (Denmark) Mads Conrad-Petersen	12–21, 18–21	(silver) Runner-up	

=== BWF International Challenge/Series (2 titles, 3 runners-up) ===
Men's doubles
Year	Tournament	Partner	Opponent	Score	Result	Ref.
2018	Sydney International	(Japan) Hiroki Okamura	(Singapore) Danny Bawa Chrisnanta (Singapore) Terry Hee	21–6, 21–11	(gold) Winner	
2022 (II)	Indonesia International	(Japan) Hiroki Okamura	(Indonesia) Rahmat Hidayat (Indonesia) Pramudya Kusumawardana	21–23, 21–16, 15–21	(silver) Runner-up	
2023	Malaysia International	(Japan) Takuto Inoue	(Malaysia) Fazriq Razif (Malaysia) Wong Vin Sean	21–16, 18–21, 21–15	(gold) Winner	
2025	Thailand International	(Japan) Daigo Tanioka	(Thailand) Narut Saengkham (Thailand) Apichasit Teerawiwat	15–21, 17–21	(silver) Runner-up	
2025	Bendigo International	(Japan) Daigo Tanioka	(Chinese Taipei) Chen Zhi-ray (Chinese Taipei) Lin Yu-chieh	21–17, 21–23, 21–23	(silver) Runner-up	

BWF International Challenge tournament
BWF International Series tournament

=== BWF Junior International (2 titles, 1 runner-up) ===
Boys' doubles
Year	Tournament	Partner	Opponent	Score	Result	Ref.
2016	Dutch Junior	(Japan) Hiroki Okamura	(Japan) Kyohei Yamashita (Japan) Naoki Yamazawa	17–21, 21–11, 22–20	(gold) Winner	
2016	German Junior	(Japan) Hiroki Okamura	(Japan) Kyohei Yamashita (Japan) Naoki Yamazawa	14–21, 19–21	(silver) Runner-up	
2016	India Junior International	(Japan) Hiroki Okamura	(India) Krishna Prasad Garaga (India) Dhruv Kapila	11–5, 12–14, 11–9, 13–11	(gold) Winner	

BWF Junior International Grand Prix tournament
