= Natsuki Oie =

Japanese badminton player

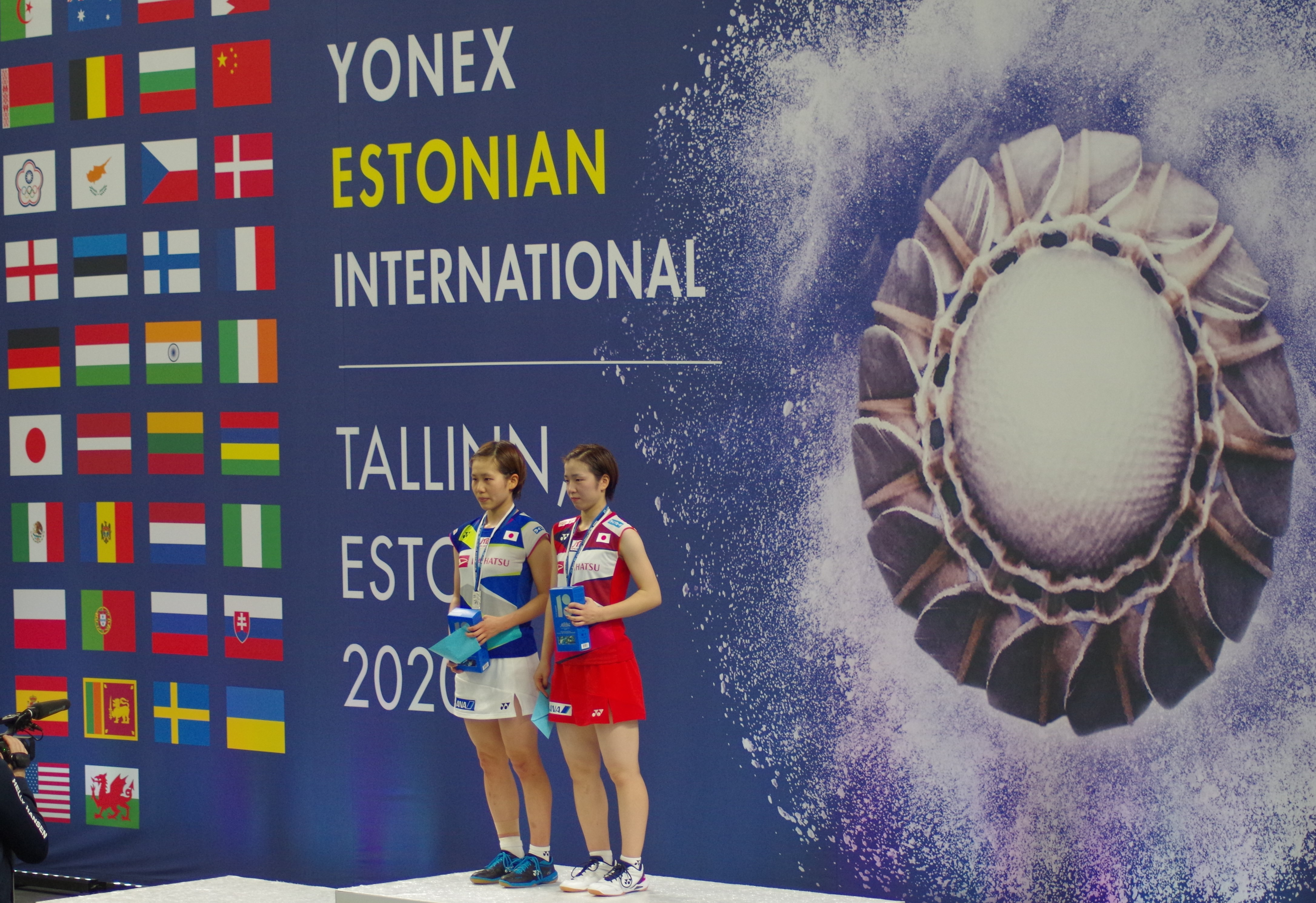
- At the 2020 Estonian International medal ceremony

Personal information
- Born: 13 July 1998 (age 28) Ishikawa, Japan

Sport
- Country: Japan
- Sport: Badminton
- Handedness: Right
- Retired: 28 February 2024

Women's singles
- Highest ranking: 70 (21 January 2020)
- BWF profile
Medal record
Women's badminton
Representing Japan
Asia Team Championships
Bronze medal – third place	2022 Selangor	Women's team
World Junior Championships
Bronze medal – third place	2016 Bilbao	Girls' singles

Natsuki Oie (大家 夏稀, Ōie Natsuki; born 13 July 1998) is a Japanese badminton player affiliated with NTT East team. She was the bronze medalist in the 2016 World Junior Championships in the girls' singles event. She had won South Australia International event in 2018 and Laos International event in 2019.

== Achievements ==
=== World Junior Championships ===
Girls' singles
Year	Venue	Opponent	Score	Result
2016	Bilbao Arena; Bilbao, Spain	(Thailand) Pornpawee Chochuwong	25–27, 19–21	Bronze

=== BWF International Challenge/Series (2 titles, 4 runners-up) ===
Women's singles
Year	Tournament	Opponent	Score	Result
2018	South Australia International	(Japan) Ayumi Mine	21–16, 10–21, 30–28	(gold) Winner
2019	Lao International	(Thailand) Phittayaporn Chaiwan	22–20, 23–21	(gold) Winner
2019	Denmark International	(Denmark) Mia Blichfeldt	18–21, 18–21	(silver) Runner-up
2020	Estonian International	(Japan) Natsuki Nidaira	12–21, 5–21	(silver) Runner-up
2020	Swedish Open	(Japan) Natsuki Nidaira	19–21, 8–21	(silver) Runner-up
2022	Réunion Open	(Japan) Riko Gunji	5–21, 14–21	(silver) Runner-up

BWF International Challenge tournament
BWF International Series tournament
