= Ayumi Mine =

Japanese badminton player (born 1992)

Personal information
- Born: 15 July 1992 (age 34) Kariya, Aichi, Japan
- Height: 1.52 m (5 ft 0 in)

Sport
- Country: Japan
- Sport: Badminton
- Retired: 31 March 2020

Women's singles
- Highest ranking: 16 (15 June 2017)
- BWF profile
Medal record
Women's badminton
Representing Japan
Asian Junior Championships
| Bronze medal – third place | 2009 Kuala Lumpur | Mixed team |

Ayumi Mine (峰 步美, Mine Ayumi; born 15 July 1992) is a Japanese badminton player.

== Career ==
Ayumi Mine was the champion at the 2016 in U.S. Open Badminton Championships and also played at the Spanish International, 2016 Vietnam Open Grand Prix, 2016 Chinese Taipei Masters, 2015 Japan Super Series and at the 2016 Indonesian Masters Grand Prix Gold, where she lost in the quarterfinals to Nichaon Jindapon from Thailand.

== Achievements ==
=== BWF World Tour (1 runner-up) ===
The BWF World Tour, announced on 19 March 2017 and implemented in 2018, is a series of elite badminton tournaments, sanctioned by Badminton World Federation (BWF). The BWF World Tour are divided into six levels, namely World Tour Finals, Super 1000, Super 750, Super 500, Super 300 (part of the HSBC World Tour), and the BWF Tour Super 100.

Women's singles
| Year | Tournament | Level | Opponent | Score | Result | Ref. |
|---|---|---|---|---|---|---|
| 2018 | Australian Open | Super 300 | (China) Cai Yanyan | 14–21, 13–21 | (silver) Runner-up | |

=== BWF Grand Prix (2 titles, 1 runner-up) ===
The BWF Grand Prix had two levels, the BWF Grand Prix and Grand Prix Gold. It was a series of badminton tournaments sanctioned by the Badminton World Federation (BWF) which was held from 2007 to 2017.

Women's singles
| Year | Tournament | Opponent | Score | Result | Ref. |
|---|---|---|---|---|---|
| 2016 | U.S. Open | (Japan) Saena Kawakami | 16–21, 21–11, 21–15 | (gold) Winner | |
| 2016 | Vietnam Open | (Singapore) Yeo Jia Min | 14–21, 17–21 | (silver) Runner-up | |
| 2016 | Chinese Taipei Masters | (Japan) Saena Kawakami | 12–10, 7–11, 11–9, 12–10 | (gold) Winner | |

BWF Grand Prix Gold tournament
BWF Grand Prix tournament

=== BWF International Challenge/Series (3 titles, 3 runners-up) ===
Women's singles
| Year | Tournament | Opponent | Score | Result | Ref. |
|---|---|---|---|---|---|
| 2012 | Banuinvest International | (Japan) Kana Ito | 19–21, 12–21 | (silver) Runner-up | |
| 2012 | Vietnam International | (Thailand) Nichaon Jindapon | 21–17, 11–21, 19–21 | (silver) Runner-up | |
| 2016 | Spanish International | (Spain) Beatriz Corrales | 21–17, 21–13 | (gold) Winner | |
| 2018 | Osaka International | (Japan) Ayaho Sugino | 21–14, 21–16 | (gold) Winner | |
| 2018 | South Australia International | (Japan) Natsuki Oie | 16–21, 21–10, 28–30 | (silver) Runner-up | |
| 2018 | Sydney International | (Chinese Taipei) Hung Yi-ting | 21–15, 21–10 | (gold) Winner | |

BWF International Challenge tournament
BWF International Series tournament
