= 2025 China Open (badminton) =

Tournament details
- Dates: 22–27 July
- Edition: 34th
- Level: Super 1000
- Total prize money: US$2,000,000
- Venue: Olympic Sports Centre Gymnasium
- Location: Changzhou, Jiangsu, China

Champions
- Men's singles: (China) Shi Yuqi
- Women's singles: (China) Wang Zhiyi
- Men's doubles: (Indonesia) Fajar Alfian (Indonesia) Muhammad Shohibul Fikri
- Women's doubles: (China) Liu Shengshu (China) Tan Ning
- Mixed doubles: (China) Feng Yanzhe (China) Huang Dongping

The 2025 China Open (officially known as the Victor China Open 2025 for sponsorship reasons) was a badminton tournament that took place at Olympic Sports Centre Gymnasium in Changzhou, Jiangsu, China from 22 to 27 July 2025 and had a total prize of $2,000,000.

== Tournament ==
The 2025 China Open was the eighteenth tournament of the 2025 BWF World Tour and also part of the China Open championships, which had been held since 1986. This tournament was organized by Chinese Badminton Association, and sanctioned by the BWF.

=== Venue ===
The tournament was held at Olympic Sports Centre Gymnasium in Changzhou, Jiangsu, China.

=== Point distribution ===
Below is the tables with the point distribution for each phase of the tournament based on the new BWF points system for the BWF World Tour Super 1000 event starting in Week 29 2025.

| Winner | Runner-up | 3/4 | 5/8 | 9/16 | 17/32 |
|---|---|---|---|---|---|
| 13,500 | 11,500 | 9,500 | 7,400 | 5,400 | 3,300 |

=== Prize money ===
The total prize money for this year tournament was US$2,000,000. Distribution of prize money was in accordance with BWF regulations.

| Event | Winner | Finalist | Semi-finals | Quarter-finals | Last 16 | Last 32 |
| Singles | $140,000 | $68,000 | $28,000 | $11,000 | $6,000 | $2,000 |
| Doubles | $148,000 | $70,000 | $28,000 | $12,500 | $6,500 | $2,000 |

== Men's singles ==
=== Seeds ===
1. (Thailand) Kunlavut Vitidsarn (quarter-finals)
2. (Denmark) Anders Antonsen (semi-finals)
3. (China) Shi Yuqi (champion)
4. (Indonesia) Jonatan Christie (second round)
5. (China) Li Shifeng (quarter-finals)
6. (Chinese Taipei) Chou Tien-chen (semi-finals)
7. (Japan) Kodai Naraoka (first round)
8. (France) Alex Lanier (first round)

=== Finals ===
Semi-finals
6 | (Chinese Taipei) Chou Tien-chen | 13 | 20
3 | (China) Shi Yuqi | 21 | 22
(China) Wang Zhengxing | 21 | 21
2 | (Denmark) Anders Antonsen | 18 | 15

Final
3 | (China) Shi Yuqi | 14 | 21 | 21
(China) Wang Zhengxing | 21 | 14 | 15

=== Top half ===
==== Section 1 ====
First round
1 | (Thailand) K Vitidsarn | 10 | 21 | 21
(Indonesia) A Farhan | 21 | 15 | 18
(Malaysia) Leong J H | 21 | 21
(Japan) K Nishimoto | 15 | 18
6 | (Chinese Taipei) Chou T-c | 21 | 21
(Chinese Taipei) Wang T-w | 18 | 16
(India) Prannoy HS | 8 | 21 | 23
(Japan) K Watanabe | 21 | 16 | 21

Second round
1 | (Thailand) K Vitidsarn | 23 | 21
(Malaysia) Leong J H | 21 | 7
6 | (Chinese Taipei) Chou T-c | 18 | 21 | 21
(India) Prannoy HS | 21 | 15 | 8

Quarter-finals
1 | (Thailand) K Vitidsarn | 17 | 11
6 | (Chinese Taipei) Chou T-c | 21 | 21

==== Section 2 ====
First round
3 | (China) Shi YQ | 21 | 21
(China) Weng HY | 16 | 11
(Denmark) R Gemke | 22 | 16 | 11
(Republic of Ireland) N Nguyen | 20 | 21 | 21
5 | (China) Li SF | 14 | 24 | 21
(India) L Sen | 21 | 22 | 11
(Hong Kong) Lee C Y | 14 | 21 | 7
(Hong Kong) Ng K L | 21 | 11 | 21

Second round
3 | (China) Shi YQ | 21 | 21
(Republic of Ireland) N Nguyen | 15 | 8
5 | (China) Li SF | 21 | 21
(Hong Kong) Ng K L | 17 | 9

Quarter-finals
3 | (China) Shi YQ | 15 | 21 | 21
5 | (China) Li SF | 21 | 15 | 11

=== Bottom half ===
==== Section 3 ====
First round
(Chinese Taipei) Lee C-h | 21 | 21
(China) Lu GZ | 8 | 15
(China) Wang ZX | 15 | 21 | 21
7 | (Japan) K Naraoka | 21 | 16 | 17
(China) Lei LX | 13 | 8
(France) C Popov | 21 | 21
(Singapore) J Teh | 17 | 12
4 | (Indonesia) J Christie | 21 | 21

Second round
(Chinese Taipei) Lee C-h | 12 | 27 | 21
(China) Wang ZX | 21 | 25 | 23
(France) C Popov | 21 | 13 | 21
4 | (Indonesia) J Christie | 12 | 21 | 16

Quarter-finals
(China) Wang ZX | 21 | 22
(France) C Popov | 6 | 20

==== Section 4 ====
First round
(Indonesia) A S Ginting | 21 | 16 | 14
PFR | (Canada) B Yang | 9 | 21 | 21
(France) T J Popov | 22 | 13 | 21
8 | (France) A Lanier | 20 | 21 | 17
(Chinese Taipei) Lin C-y | 21 | 16 | 21
(Chinese Taipei) Chi Y-j | 13 | 21 | 8
(Japan) Y Tanaka | 19 | 15
2 | (Denmark) A Antonsen | 21 | 21

Second round
PFR | (Canada) B Yang | 17 | 16
(France) T J Popov | 21 | 21
(Chinese Taipei) Lin C-y | 19 | 22 | 20
2 | (Denmark) A Antonsen | 21 | 20 | 22

Quarter-finals
(France) T J Popov | 21 | 12 | 8
2 | (Denmark) A Antonsen | 19 | 21 | 21

== Women's singles ==
=== Seeds ===
1. (South Korea) An Se-young (semi-finals)
2. (China) Wang Zhiyi (champion)
3. (Japan) Akane Yamaguchi (semi-finals)
4. (China) Han Yue (final)
5. (China) Chen Yufei (quarter-finals)
6. (Japan) Tomoka Miyazaki (first round)
7. (Thailand) Pornpawee Chochuwong (first round)
8. (Indonesia) Gregoria Mariska Tunjung (quarter-finals)

=== Finals ===
Semi-finals
1 | (South Korea) An Se-young | 19 | 6^{r}
4 | (China) Han Yue | 21 | 11
3 | (Japan) Akane Yamaguchi | 20 | 11
2 | (China) Wang Zhiyi | 22 | 21

Final
4 | (China) Han Yue | 8 | 13
2 | (China) Wang Zhiyi | 21 | 21

=== Top half ===
==== Section 1 ====
First round
1 | (South Korea) An S-y | 13 | 21 | 21
(Canada) M Li | 21 | 3 | 10
(South Korea) Sim Y-j | 21 | 14 | 21
(Indonesia) P K Wardani | 14 | 21 | 19
5 | (China) Chen YF | 21 | 21
(South Korea) Kim G-e | 15 | 11
(China) Gao FJ | 21 | 21
(Denmark) J D Jakobsen | 11 | 13

Second round
1 | (South Korea) An S-y | 21 | 21
(South Korea) Sim Y-j | 13 | 15
5 | (China) Chen YF | 13 | 21 | 21
(China) Gao FJ | 21 | 5 | 9

Quarter-finals
1 | (South Korea) An S-y | 21 | 21
5 | (China) Chen YF | 18 | 19

==== Section 2 ====
First round
4 | (China) Han Y | 21 | 12 | 21
(Japan) N Nidaira | 9 | 21 | 17
(Thailand) R Intanon | 22 | 16 | 19
(China) Han QX | 20 | 21 | 21
8 | (Indonesia) G M Tunjung | 23 | 21
(Japan) K Sugiyama | 21 | 9
(Chinese Taipei) Lin H-t | 21 | 21 | 21
(India) A Upadhyaya | 23 | 11 | 10

Second round
4 | (China) Han Y | 19 | 21 | 21
(China) Han QX | 21 | 15 | 11
8 | (Indonesia) G M Tunjung | 21 | 21
(Chinese Taipei) Lin H-t | 13 | 14

Quarter-finals
4 | (China) Han Y | 21 | 21
8 | (Indonesia) G M Tunjung | 19 | 18

=== Bottom half ===
==== Section 3 ====
First round
(India) U Hooda | 21 | 21
(Scotland) K Gilmour | 11 | 16
(India) P. V. Sindhu | 21 | 8 | 21
6 | (Japan) T Miyazaki | 15 | 21 | 17
PFR | (Ukraine) P Buhrova | 16 | 19
(Thailand) B Ongbamrungphan | 21 | 21
(Denmark) M Blichfeldt | 12 | 9
3 | (Japan) A Yamaguchi | 21 | 21

Second round
(India) U Hooda | 21 | 19 | 21
(India) P. V. Sindhu | 16 | 21 | 13
(Thailand) B Ongbamrungphan | 14 | 17
3 | (Japan) A Yamaguchi | 21 | 21

Quarter-finals
(India) U Hooda | 16 | 12
3 | (Japan) A Yamaguchi | 21 | 21

==== Section 4 ====
First round
(Denmark) L Kjaersfeldt | 20 | 16
(Chinese Taipei) Sung S-y | 22 | 21
(Chinese Taipei) Chiu P-c | 20 | 21 | 11
7 | (Thailand) P Chochuwong | 22 | 19 | 5^{r}
(United States) BW Zhang | 21 | 10 | 13
(Japan) R Gunji | 19 | 21 | 21
(Chinese Taipei) Hsu W-c | 16 | 9
2 | (China) Wang ZY | 21 | 21

Second round
(Chinese Taipei) Sung S-y | 21 | 15 | 18
(Chinese Taipei) Chiu P-c | 17 | 21 | 21
(Japan) R Gunji | 15 | 13
2 | (China) Wang ZY | 21 | 21

Quarter-finals
(Chinese Taipei) Chiu P-c | 16 | 11
2 | (China) Wang ZY | 21 | 21

== Men's doubles ==
=== Seeds ===
1. (Malaysia) Goh Sze Fei / Nur Izzuddin (first round)
2. (Malaysia) Aaron Chia / Soh Wooi Yik (final)
3. (South Korea) Kim Won-ho / Seo Seung-jae (quarter-finals)
4. (Denmark) Kim Astrup / Anders Skaarup Rasmussen (first round)
5. (China) Liang Weikeng / Wang Chang (semi-finals)
6. (Malaysia) Man Wei Chong / Tee Kai Wun (quarter-finals)
7. (Indonesia) Sabar Karyaman Gutama / Muhammad Reza Pahlevi Isfahani (second round)
8. (Indonesia) Leo Rolly Carnando / Bagas Maulana (second round)

=== Finals ===
Semi-finals
5 | (China) Liang Weikeng (China) Wang Chang | 19 | 17
(Indonesia) Fajar Alfian (Indonesia) Muhammad Shohibul Fikri | 21 | 21
(India) Satwiksairaj Rankireddy (India) Chirag Shetty | 13 | 17
2 | (Malaysia) Aaron Chia (Malaysia) Soh Wooi Yik | 21 | 21

Final
(Indonesia) Fajar Alfian (Indonesia) Muhammad Shohibul Fikri | 21 | 21
2 | (Malaysia) Aaron Chia (Malaysia) Soh Wooi Yik | 15 | 14

=== Top half ===
==== Section 1 ====
First round
1 | (Malaysia) Goh S F (Malaysia) N Izzuddin | 21 | 15 | 17
(South Korea) Kang M-h (South Korea) Ki D-j | 15 | 21 | 21
(Chinese Taipei) Chiu H-c (Chinese Taipei) Wang C-l | 21 | 12 | 14
(Denmark) D Lundgaard (Denmark) M Vestergaard | 12 | 21 | 21
5 | (China) Liang WK (China) Wang C | 21 | 21
(Chinese Taipei) Lee J-h (Chinese Taipei) Yang P-hs | 11 | 11
(China) Huang D (China) Liu Ya | 16 | 26 | 21
(Chinese Taipei) Liu K-h (Chinese Taipei) Yang P-ha | 21 | 24 | 19

Second round
(South Korea) Kang M-h (South Korea) Ki D-j | 21 | 21
(Denmark) D Lundgaard (Denmark) M Vestergaard | 17 | 13
5 | (China) Liang WK (China) Wang C | 21 | 21
(China) Huang D (China) Liu Ya | 15 | 12

Quarter-finals
(South Korea) Kang M-h (South Korea) Ki D-j | 16 | 20
5 | (China) Liang WK (China) Wang C | 21 | 22

==== Section 2 ====
First round
3 | (South Korea) Kim W-h (South Korea) Seo S-j | 21 | 21
(China) Xie HN (China) Zeng WH | 14 | 14
(China) Chen BY (China) Liu Yi | 14 | 17
(Japan) T Hoki (Japan) Y Kobayashi | 21 | 21
7 | (Indonesia) S K Gutama (Indonesia) M R P Isfahani | 21 | 21
(United States) Chen Z-y (United States) P Smith | 9 | 14
(Indonesia) F Alfian (Indonesia) M S Fikri | 21 | 21
(Malaysia) Choong H J (Malaysia) M Haikal | 11 | 10

Second round
3 | (South Korea) Kim W-h (South Korea) Seo S-j | 21 | 21
(Japan) T Hoki (Japan) Y Kobayashi | 13 | 13
7 | (Indonesia) S K Gutama (Indonesia) M R P Isfahani | 8 | 13
(Indonesia) F Alfian (Indonesia) M S Fikri | 21 | 21

Quarter-finals
3 | (South Korea) Kim W-h (South Korea) Seo S-j | 19 | 14
(Indonesia) F Alfian (Indonesia) M S Fikri | 21 | 21

=== Bottom half ===
==== Section 3 ====
First round
(India) S Rankireddy (India) C Shetty | 21 | 21
(Japan) K Mitsuhashi (Japan) H Okamura | 13 | 9
(Japan) T Nomura (Japan) Y Shimogami | 17 | 17
8 | (Indonesia) L R Carnando (Indonesia) B Maulana | 21 | 21
(Malaysia) Ong Y S (Malaysia) Teo E Y | 21 | 21
(China) Ren XY (China) Sun WJ | 17 | 14
(Thailand) K Kedren (Thailand) D Puavaranukroh | 18 | 21 | 21
4 | (Denmark) K Astrup (Denmark) A S Rasmussen | 21 | 19 | 18

Second round
(India) S Rankireddy (India) C Shetty | 21 | 21
8 | (Indonesia) L R Carnando (Indonesia) B Maulana | 19 | 19
(Malaysia) Ong Y S (Malaysia) Teo E Y | 21 | 21
(Thailand) K Kedren (Thailand) D Puavaranukroh | 16 | 16

Quarter-finals
(India) S Rankireddy (India) C Shetty | 21 | 21
(Malaysia) Ong Y S (Malaysia) Teo E Y | 18 | 14

==== Section 4 ====
First round
(Malaysia) N M Azriyn A (Malaysia) Tan W K | 21 | 18 | 21
(Chinese Taipei) Lee F-c (Chinese Taipei) Lee F-j | 16 | 21 | 14
(Malaysia) J Arif (Malaysia) Yap R K | 17 | 19
6 | (Malaysia) Man W C (Malaysia) Tee K W | 21 | 21
(France) C Popov (France) T J Popov | 21 | 21
(Canada) K Lee (Canada) T A Lindeman | 17 | 14
(Denmark) R Kjær (Denmark) F Søgaard | 19 | 15
2 | (Malaysia) A Chia (Malaysia) Soh W Y | 21 | 21

Second round
(Malaysia) N M Azriyn A (Malaysia) Tan W K | 21 | 17 | 19
6 | (Malaysia) Man W C (Malaysia) Tee K W | 17 | 21 | 21
(France) C Popov (France) T J Popov | 17 | 18
2 | (Malaysia) A Chia (Malaysia) Soh W Y | 21 | 21

Quarter-finals
6 | (Malaysia) Man W C (Malaysia) Tee K W | 16 | 16
2 | (Malaysia) A Chia (Malaysia) Soh W Y | 21 | 21

== Women's doubles ==
=== Seeds ===
1. (China) Liu Shengshu / Tan Ning (champions)
2. (Japan) Nami Matsuyama / Chiharu Shida (first round)
3. (Malaysia) Pearly Tan / Thinaah Muralitharan (semi-finals)
4. (South Korea) Baek Ha-na / Lee So-hee (quarter-finals)
5. (China) Li Yijing / Luo Xumin (quarter-finals)
6. (Japan) Rin Iwanaga / Kie Nakanishi (second round)
7. (South Korea) Kim Hye-jeong / Kong Hee-yong (semi-finals)
8. (Japan) Yuki Fukushima / Mayu Matsumoto (quarter-finals)

=== Finals ===
Semi-finals
1 | (China) Liu Shengshu (China) Tan Ning | 21 | 21
7 | (South Korea) Kim Hye-jeong (South Korea) Kong Hee-yong | 10 | 12
3 | (Malaysia) Pearly Tan (Malaysia) Thinaah Muralitharan | 14 | 17
(China) Jia Yifan (China) Zhang Shuxian | 21 | 21

Final
1 | (China) Liu Shengshu (China) Tan Ning | 24 | 17 | 21
(China) Jia Yifan (China) Zhang Shuxian | 22 | 21 | 14

=== Top half ===
==== Section 1 ====
First round
1 | (China) Liu SS (China) Tan N | 21 | 21
(Australia) G Somerville (Australia) A Yu | 10 | 14
(India) K Selvam (India) S Singhi | 16 | 14
(United States) L Lam (United States) A Lee | 21 | 21
5 | (China) Li YJ (China) Luo XM | 21 | 21
(United States) F Corbett (United States) J Gai | 10 | 9
(Japan) M Otake (Japan) M Takahashi | 24 | 21
(England) A Lado (England) E van Leeuwen | 22 | 10

Second round
1 | (China) Liu SS (China) Tan N | 21 | 21
(United States) L Lam (United States) A Lee | 9 | 13
5 | (China) Li YJ (China) Luo XM | 21 | 21
(Japan) M Otake (Japan) M Takahashi | 17 | 19

Quarter-finals
1 | (China) Liu SS (China) Tan N | 21 | 17 | 21
5 | (China) Li YJ (China) Luo XM | 13 | 21 | 16

==== Section 2 ====
First round
4 | (South Korea) Baek H-n (South Korea) Lee S-h | 21 | 21
(Hong Kong) Fan K Y (Hong Kong) Yau M Y | 6 | 15
(Ukraine) P Buhrova (Ukraine) Y Kantemyr | 11 | 18
(Hong Kong) Lui L L (Hong Kong) Tsang H Y | 21 | 21
7 | (South Korea) Kim H-j (South Korea) Kong H-y | w | / | o
(Indonesia) L T Mayasari (Indonesia) S F S Ramadhanti
(India) A Pramuthesh (India) S Singh | 12 | 5
(Chinese Taipei) Hsieh P-s (Chinese Taipei) Hung E-t | 21 | 21

Second round
4 | (South Korea) Baek H-n (South Korea) Lee S-h | 21 | 21
(Hong Kong) Lui L L (Hong Kong) Tsang H Y | 7 | 16
7 | (South Korea) Kim H-j (South Korea) Kong H-y | 21 | 19 | 21
(Chinese Taipei) Hsieh P-s (Chinese Taipei) Hung E-t | 18 | 21 | 17

Quarter-finals
4 | (South Korea) Baek H-n (South Korea) Lee S-h | 21 | 20 | 12
7 | (South Korea) Kim H-j (South Korea) Kong H-y | 6 | 22 | 21

=== Bottom half ===
==== Section 3 ====
First round
(Chinese Taipei) Sung S-y (Chinese Taipei) Yu C-h | 10 | 16
(Indonesia) F D Kusuma (Indonesia) A C Pratiwi | 21 | 21
(Chinese Taipei) Chang C-h (Chinese Taipei) Yang C-t | 15 | 10
8 | (Japan) Y Fukushima (Japan) M Matsumoto | 21 | 21
(Japan) R Hirokami (Japan) S Hobara | 21 | 21
(Bulgaria) G Stoeva (Bulgaria) S Stoeva | 10 | 16
(Malaysia) Ong X Y (Malaysia) C Ting | 8 | 12
3 | (Malaysia) P Tan (Malaysia) Thinaah M | 21 | 21

Second round
(Indonesia) F D Kusuma (Indonesia) A C Pratiwi | 14 | 9
8 | (Japan) Y Fukushima (Japan) M Matsumoto | 21 | 21
(Japan) R Hirokami (Japan) S Hobara | 17 | 13
3 | (Malaysia) P Tan (Malaysia) Thinaah M | 21 | 21

Quarter-finals
8 | (Japan) Y Fukushima (Japan) M Matsumoto | 16 | 12
3 | (Malaysia) P Tan (Malaysia) Thinaah M | 21 | 21

==== Section 4 ====
First round
(Malaysia) Go P K (Malaysia) Teoh M X | 21 | 21
(Poland) P Hankiewicz (Poland) K Marczak | 5 | 6
(South Korea) Jeong N-e (South Korea) Lee Y-w | 19 | 14
6 | (Japan) R Iwanaga (Japan) K Nakanishi | 21 | 21
(Hong Kong) Yeung N T (Hong Kong) Yeung P L | 21 | 21
(India) R Panda (India) S Panda | 12 | 13
(China) Jia YF (China) Zhang SX | 21 | 21 | 21
2 | (Japan) N Matsuyama (Japan) C Shida | 23 | 11 | 11

Second round
(Malaysia) Go P K (Malaysia) Teoh M X | 26 | 7 | 21
6 | (Japan) R Iwanaga (Japan) K Nakanishi | 24 | 21 | 18
(Hong Kong) Yeung N T (Hong Kong) Yeung P L | 9 | 12
(China) Jia YF (China) Zhang SX | 21 | 21

Quarter-finals
(Malaysia) Go P K (Malaysia) Teoh M X | 7 | 15
(China) Jia YF (China) Zhang SX | 21 | 21

== Mixed doubles ==
=== Seeds ===
1. (China) Feng Yanzhe / Huang Dongping (champions)
2. (China) Jiang Zhenbang / Wei Yaxin (final)
3. (Hong Kong) Tang Chun Man / Tse Ying Suet (quarter-finals)
4. (Malaysia) Chen Tang Jie / Toh Ee Wei (quarter-finals)
5. (Thailand) Dechapol Puavaranukroh / Supissara Paewsampran (second round)
6. (Malaysia) Goh Soon Huat / Shevon Jemie Lai (first round)
7. (France) Thom Gicquel / Delphine Delrue (first round)
8. (Japan) Hiroki Midorikawa / Natsu Saito (second round)

=== Finals ===
Semi-finals
1 | (China) Feng Yanzhe (China) Huang Dongping | 21 | 21
(China) Guo Xinwa (China) Chen Fanghui | 17 | 11
(Indonesia) Jafar Hidayatullah (Indonesia) Felisha Pasaribu | 21 | 15 | 16
2 | (China) Jiang Zhenbang (China) Wei Yaxin | 16 | 21 | 21

Final
1 | (China) Feng Yanzhe (China) Huang Dongping | 23 | 21
2 | (China) Jiang Zhenbang (China) Wei Yaxin | 21 | 17

=== Top half ===
==== Section 1 ====
First round
1 | (China) Feng YZ (China) Huang DP | 21 | 21
(Japan) Y Shimogami (Japan) S Hobara | 18 | 16
(India) R Kapoor (India) R Gadde | 27 | 16 | 14
(Malaysia) Wong T C (Malaysia) Lim C S | 25 | 21 | 21
8 | (Japan) H Midorikawa (Japan) N Saito | 22 | 21 | 21
(Chinese Taipei) Ye H-w (Chinese Taipei) N G Chan | 24 | 19 | 19
(Indonesia) R N Kusharjanto (Indonesia) G E Widjaja | 21 | 21
(India) A Surya (India) A Pramuthesh | 12 | 17

Second round
1 | (China) Feng YZ (China) Huang DP | 21 | 24 | 21
(Malaysia) Wong T C (Malaysia) Lim C S | 11 | 26 | 9
8 | (Japan) H Midorikawa (Japan) N Saito | 14 | 15
(Indonesia) R N Kusharjanto (Indonesia) G E Widjaja | 21 | 21

Quarter-finals
1 | (China) Feng YZ (China) Huang DP | 21 | 21
(Indonesia) R N Kusharjanto (Indonesia) G E Widjaja | 14 | 11

==== Section 2 ====
First round
4 | (Malaysia) Chen T J (Malaysia) Toh E W | 22 | 21
(United States) P Smith (United States) J Gai | 20 | 12
(Malaysia) Hoo P R (Malaysia) Cheng S Y | 15 | 16
(China) Gao JX (China) Wu MY | 21 | 21
5 | (Thailand) D Puavaranukroh (Thailand) S Paewsampran | 21 | 21
(Singapore) T Hee (Singapore) Jin YJ | 12 | 11
(China) Guo XW (China) Chen FH | 17 | 21 | 21
(Denmark) J Toft (Denmark) A Magelund | 21 | 19 | 14

Second round
4 | (Malaysia) Chen T J (Malaysia) Toh E W | 22 | 21
(China) Gao JX (China) Wu MY | 20 | 17
5 | (Thailand) D Puavaranukroh (Thailand) S Paewsampran | 20 | 15
(China) Guo XW (China) Chen FH | 22 | 21

Quarter-finals
4 | (Malaysia) Chen T J (Malaysia) Toh E W | 19 | 15
(China) Guo XW (China) Chen FH | 21 | 21

=== Bottom half ===
==== Section 3 ====
First round
(Denmark) M Vestergaard (Denmark) C Busch | 21 | 21 | 21
(England) C Hemming (England) E van Leeuwen | 23 | 13 | 18
(Indonesia) J Hidayatullah (Indonesia) F Pasaribu | 18 | 24 | 21
6 | (Malaysia) Goh S H (Malaysia) S J Lai | 21 | 22 | 15
(Thailand) R Oupthong (Thailand) J Sudjaipraparat | 18 | 21 | 24
(Chinese Taipei) Yang P-hs (Chinese Taipei) Hu L-f | 21 | 19 | 22
(United States) Chen Z-y (United States) F Corbett | 12 | 12
3 | (Hong Kong) Tang C M (Hong Kong) Tse Y S | 21 | 21

Second round
(Denmark) M Vestergaard (Denmark) C Busch | 9 | 15
(Indonesia) J Hidayatullah (Indonesia) F Pasaribu | 21 | 21
(Thailand) R Oupthong (Thailand) J Sudjaipraparat | 18 | 16
3 | (Hong Kong) Tang C M (Hong Kong) Tse Y S | 21 | 21

Quarter-finals
(Indonesia) J Hidayatullah (Indonesia) F Pasaribu | 21 | 18 | 21
3 | (Hong Kong) Tang C M (Hong Kong) Tse Y S | 13 | 21 | 17

==== Section 4 ====
First round
(Indonesia) A Syahnawi (Indonesia) N V Marwah | 21 | 17 | 21
(China) Cheng X (China) Zhang C | 18 | 21 | 19
(South Korea) Wang C (South Korea) Jeong N-e | 21 | 16 | 21
7 | (France) T Gicquel (France) D Delrue | 17 | 21 | 15
(Chinese Taipei) Lu M-c (Chinese Taipei) Hung E-t | 21 | 19 | 21
(France) J Maio (France) L Palermo | 16 | 21 | 12
(Canada) K Lee (Canada) J Wu | 14 | 11
2 | (China) Jiang ZB (China) Wei YX | 21 | 21

Second round
(Indonesia) A Syahnawi (Indonesia) N V Marwah | 21 | 13 | 19
(South Korea) Wang C (South Korea) Jeong N-e | 12 | 21 | 21
(Chinese Taipei) Lu M-c (Chinese Taipei) Hung E-t | 11 | 12
2 | (China) Jiang ZB (China) Wei YX | 21 | 21

Quarter-finals
(South Korea) Wang C (South Korea) Jeong N-e | 17 | 14
2 | (China) Jiang ZB (China) Wei YX | 21 | 21

| Preceded by 2025 Japan Open | BWF World Tour; 2025 BWF season | Succeeded by 2025 Macau Open |
