= Mizuki Otake =

Japanese badminton player (born 2002)

Mizuki Ōtake
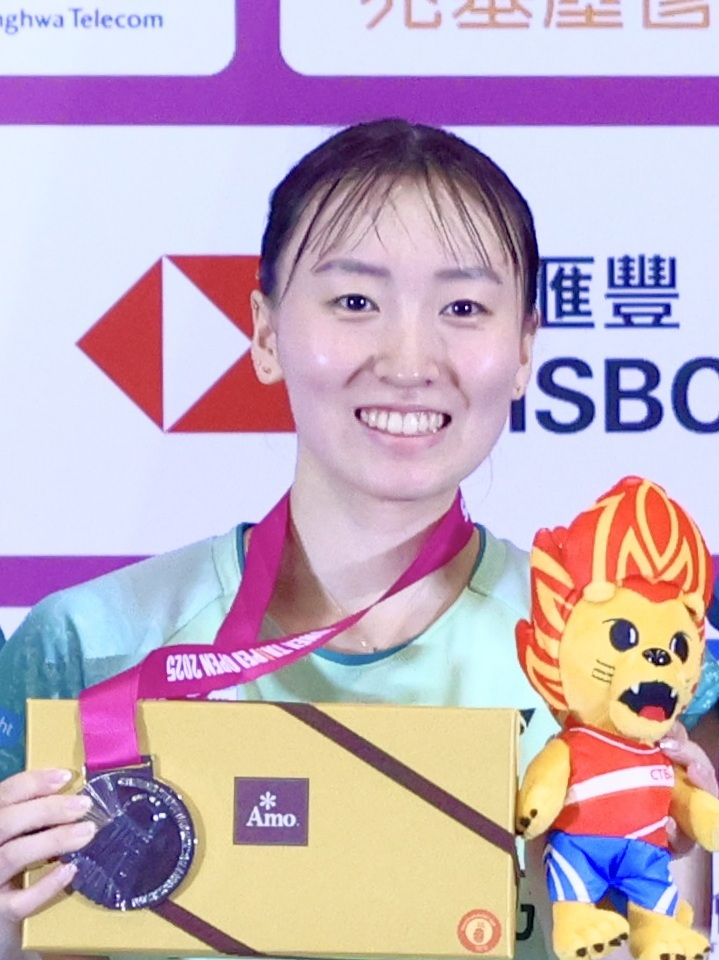
- Otake in 2025

Personal information
- Born: 27 February 2002 (age 24) Niigata, Niigata Prefecture, Japan
- Height: 1.60 m (5 ft 3 in)

Sport
- Country: Japan
- Sport: Badminton
- Handedness: Right
- Coached by: Yuki Kaneko

Women's doubles
- Career record: 46 wins, 19 losses (70.77%)
- Highest ranking: 22 (with Miyu Takahashi, 29 July 2025)
- BWF profile
Medal record
Women's badminton
Representing Japan
World Junior Championships
Bronze medal – third place	2019 Kazan	Mixed team

Mizuki Otake (大竹 望月, Ōtake Mizuki; born 27 February 2002) is a Japanese badminton player. She graduated from the Aomori Yamada High School, and joined BIPROGY badminton team on 1 April 2020.

== Career ==
=== 2024 ===
Otake and Takahashi competed in the Taipei Open in September. It was their first time reaching the quarter-finals of a tournament at this level. They reached the finals of two Super 100 tournaments. They were runners-up at the Indonesia Masters, losing to Jesita Putri Miantoro and Febi Setianingrum. They then won the Vietnam Open, defeating Tidapron Kleebyeesun and Nattamon Laisuan to win their first BWF World Tour title. Otake and Takahashi made their Super 500 tournament debut at the Japan Masters in November, where they lost in the first round to the sixth-seeded Chinese pair Jia Yifan and Zhang Shuxian.

=== 2025: German Open champion ===
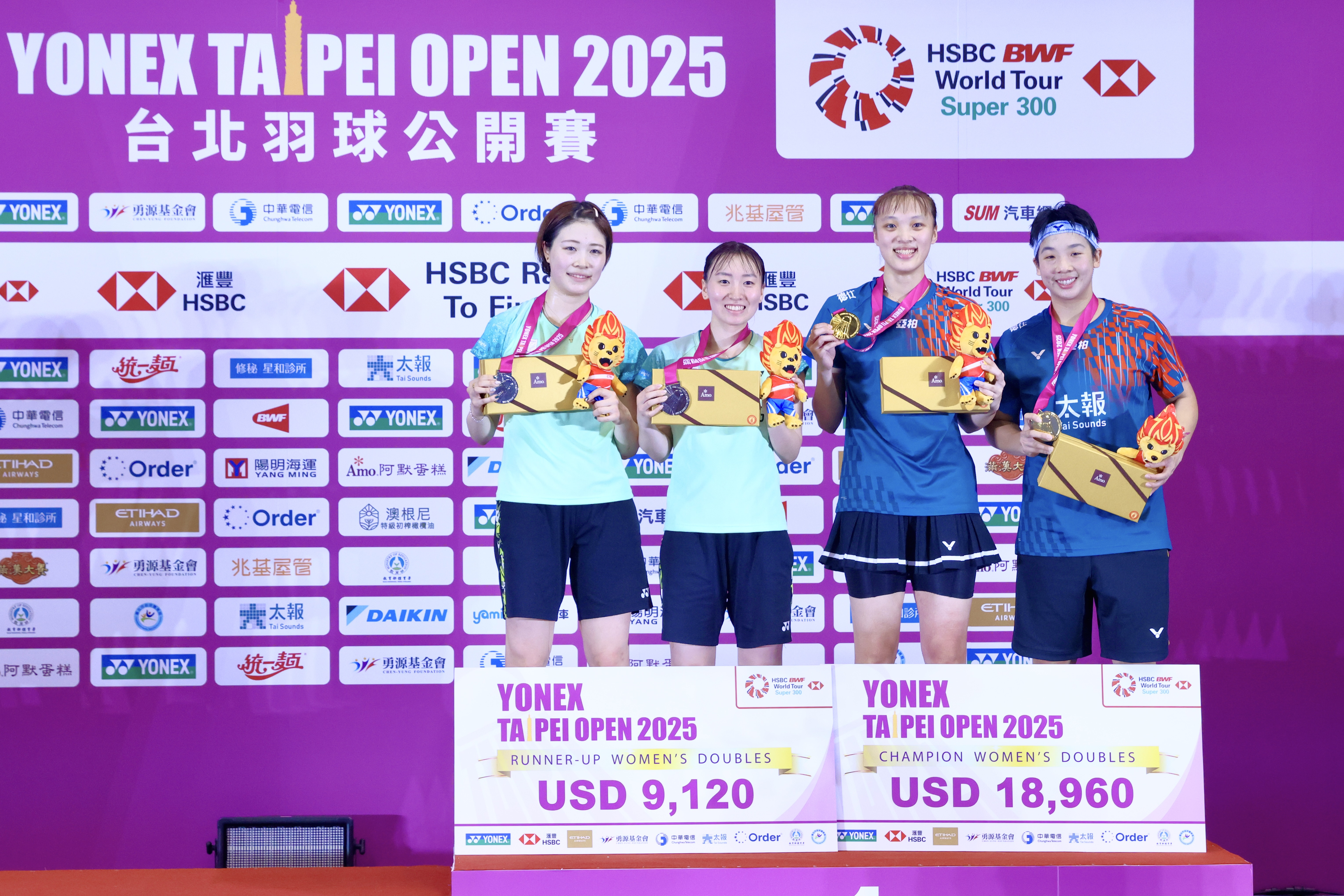
Otake and Takahashi on the podium as the runners-up at the 2025 Taipei Open.

Otake was selected as a member of the 2025 Japan National Team in the women's doubles with Takahashi, coached by Kei Nakashima and Mizuki Fujii. Otake and Takahashi won their first Super 300 tournament this year at the German Open in March, defeating the first seed Gabriela and Stefani Stoeva. In May, the pair also reached the final of the Super 300 Taipei Open, where they finished as runner-up to Hsieh Pei-shan and Hung En-tzu. Following these results, on 29 July 2025, Takahashi and Otake achieved a career-high women's doubles ranking of world No. 22.

=== 2025: Super 300 title and hip injury ===
In 2025, Otake and Miyu Takahashi were selected for the Japanese national team. They won their first BWF World Tour Super 300 title at the German Open, defeating top seeds Gabriela Stoeva and Stefani Stoeva in the final. In May, they reached another Super 300 final at the Taipei Open. After reaching the second round at both the Japan Open and China Open in July, the pair achieved a career-high world ranking of No. 22.

However, following the China Open, their partnership was interrupted by Otake's persistent hip problem. She had been unable to train properly for approximately six months, while Takahashi continued training individually. The pair returned at the All Japan Championships in December, but were eliminated in the third round. With her hip-joint pain still unresolved, Otake was scheduled to undergo surgery in January 2026.

=== 2026 ===
Otake underwent hip surgery in January 2026, after which she began a prolonged rehabilitation period. Six months after the operation, she reported that her mobility was continuing to improve, although she had not yet made a full recovery.

== Achievements ==
=== BWF World Tour (2 titles, 2 runners-up) ===
The BWF World Tour, which was announced on 19 March 2017 and implemented in 2018, is a series of elite badminton tournaments sanctioned by the Badminton World Federation (BWF). The BWF World Tours are divided into levels of World Tour Finals, Super 1000, Super 750, Super 500, Super 300 (part of the HSBC World Tour), and the BWF Tour Super 100.

Women's doubles
Year	Tournament	Level	Partner	Opponent	Score	Result	Ref.
2024 (I)	Indonesia Masters	Super 100	(Japan) Miyu Takahashi	(Indonesia) Jesita Putri Miantoro (Indonesia) Febi Setianingrum	15–21, 13–21	(silver) Runner-up	
2024	Vietnam Open	Super 100	(Japan) Miyu Takahashi	(Thailand) Tidapron Kleebyeesun (Thailand) Nattamon Laisuan	19–21, 22–20, 21–7	(gold) Winner	
2025	German Open	Super 300	(Japan) Miyu Takahashi	(Bulgaria) Gabriela Stoeva (Bulgaria) Stefani Stoeva	21–17, 20–22, 21–12	(gold) Winner	
2025	Taipei Open	Super 300	(Japan) Miyu Takahashi	(Chinese Taipei) Hsieh Pei-shan (Chinese Taipei) Hung En-tzu	14–21, 15–21	(silver) Runner-up	

=== BWF International Challenge/Series (1 title, 1 runner-up) ===
Women's doubles
Year	Tournament	Partner	Opponent	Score	Result	Ref.
2023	Osaka International	(Japan) Miyu Takahashi	(South Korea) Lee Yu-lim (South Korea) Shin Seung-chan	23–21, 21–13	(silver) Runner-up	
2024	Northern Marianas Open	(Japan) Miyu Takahashi	(Japan) Miki Kanehiro (Japan) Rui Kiyama	21–4, 21–10	(gold) Winner	

BWF International Challenge tournament

== Performance timeline ==
Key

W	Won	F	Finalist	SF	Semi-finalist
QF	Quarter-finalist	#R	Rounds 4, 3, 2, 1	RR	Round-robin stage
Q#	Qualification round	A	Absent	w/d	Withdrew
G	Gold	S	Silver	B	Bronze
NH	Not held	N/A	Not applicable	DNQ	Did not qualify

=== National team ===
Junior level

Team events	2019	Ref
World Junior Championships	B	

=== Individual competitions ===
==== Junior level ====
- Girls' doubles

Events	2019
World Junior Championships	4R

- Mixed doubles

Events	2019
World Junior Championships	QF

==== Senior level ====
Event	2025	Ref
Asian Championships	1R	
World Championships	w/d	

Tournament	BWF World Tour				Best	Ref
Tournament	2023	2024	2025	2026	Best	Ref
German Open	A		W	A	W ('25)	
Orléans Masters	A		Q1	A	Q1 ('25)	
Ruichang China Masters	A	2R	A		2R ('24)	
Thailand Open	A		1R	A	1R ('25)	
Japan Open	A		2R	A	2R ('25)	
China Open	A		2R	A	2R ('25)	
Taipei Open	A	QF	F	A	F ('25)	
Indonesia Masters Super 100	A	F	A		F ('24)	
Vietnam Open	1R	W	A		W ('24)	
Kaohsiung Masters	QF	A			QF ('23)	
Japan Masters	A	1R	w/d	A	1R ('24)	
Year-end ranking	148	59	52		52	
Tournament	2023	2024	2025	2026	Best	Ref

== Wins over top-10 ranked pairs ==
Wins over pairs who were ranked in the world's top 10 at the time the match was played.

#	Partner	Opponents	Rk	Tournament	Rd	Score	Rk	Ref.
1	(Japan) Miyu Takahashi	(China) Li Yijing (China) Luo Xumin	5	2025 Japan Open	1R	15–21, 21–17, 21–12	37	

== Record against selected opponents ==
Record against year-end Finals finalists, World Championships semi-finalists, and Olympic quarter-finalists. Accurate as of 23 August 2026.

=== Miyu Takahashi ===
Players	M	W	L	Diff.
(Bulgaria) Gabriela Stoeva & Stefani Stoeva	1	1	0	+1
(China) Li Yijing & Luo Xumin	2	1	1	0
