= 2025 German Open (badminton) =

Badminton tournament in Germany

Tournament details
- Dates: 25 February – 2 March
- Edition: 66th
- Level: Super 300
- Total prize money: US$240,000
- Venue: Westenergie Sporthalle
- Location: Mülheim, Germany

Champions
- Men's singles: (Denmark) Viktor Axelsen
- Women's singles: (Singapore) Yeo Jia Min
- Men's doubles: (South Korea) Kim Won-ho (South Korea) Seo Seung-jae
- Women's doubles: (Japan) Mizuki Otake (Japan) Miyu Takahashi
- Mixed doubles: (Netherlands) Robin Tabeling (Denmark) Alexandra Bøje

The 2025 German Open (officially known as the Yonex German Open 2025 for sponsorship reasons), was a badminton tournament that took place at the Westenergie Sporthalle, Mülheim, Germany, from 25 February to 2 March 2025 and had a total prize of US$240,000.

== Tournament ==
The 2025 German Open was the fifth tournament of the 2025 BWF World Tour and was part of the German Open championships, which have been held since 1955. This tournament was organized by Vermarktungsgesellschaft Badminton Deutschland (VBD) mbH for the German Badminton Association with sanction from the BWF.

=== Venue ===
This tournament was held at the Westenergie Sporthalle in Mülheim, Germany.

=== Point distribution ===
Below is the point distribution table for each phase of the tournament based on the BWF points system for the BWF World Tour Super 300 event.

Winner	Runner-up	3/4	5/8	9/16	17/32	33/64	65/128
7,000	5,950	4,900	3,850	2,750	1,670	660	320

=== Prize pool ===
The total prize money is US$240,000 with the distribution of the prize money in accordance with BWF regulations.

Event	Winner	Finalist	Semi-finals	Quarter-finals	Last 16
Singles	$18,000	$9,120	$3,480	$1,440	$840
Doubles	$18,960	$9,120	$3,360	$1,740	$900

== Men's singles ==
=== Seeds ===
1. (Denmark) Viktor Axelsen (champion)
2. (Singapore) Loh Kean Yew (final)
3. (France) Toma Junior Popov (semi-finals)
4. (France) Christo Popov (second round)
5. (Singapore) Jason Teh (quarter-finals)
6. (Denmark) Rasmus Gemke (second round)
7. (China) Wang Zhengxing (quarter-finals)
8. (Canada) Brian Yang (second round)

=== Finals ===
Semi-finals
1	(Denmark) Viktor Axelsen	21	17	21
3	(France) Toma Junior Popov	19	21	17
(Japan) Koo Takahashi	13	14
2	(Singapore) Loh Kean Yew	21	21

Final
1	(Denmark) Viktor Axelsen	21	21
2	(Singapore) Loh Kean Yew	19	18

=== Top half ===
==== Section 1 ====
First round
1	(Denmark) V Axelsen	20	21	21
(Japan) R Hatano	22	16	9
Q2	(Chinese Taipei) Wang P-w	15	16
(Indonesia) A Farhan	21	21
6	(Denmark) R Gemke	14	21	21
(Denmark) M Christophersen	21	18	19
(Hong Kong) J Gunawan	21	21
(India) A Shetty	15	16

Second round
1	(Denmark) V Axelsen	21	21
(Indonesia) A Farhan	13	18
6	(Denmark) R Gemke	11	21	13
(Hong Kong) J Gunawan	21	15	21

Quarter-finals
1	(Denmark) V Axelsen	11	21	21
(Hong Kong) J Gunawan	21	13	9

==== Section 2 ====
First round
3	(France) T J Popov	21	21
Q1	(Netherlands) J Kweekel	14	15
(India) S Kidambi	14	12
(India) P Rajawat	21	21
8	(Canada) B Yang	21	18	21
(Finland) K Koljonen	19	21	11
(Denmark) M Johannesen	21	19	19
Q3	(India) T Mannepalli	10	21	21

Second round
3	(France) T J Popov	16	21	21
(India) P Rajawat	21	18	4
8	(Canada) B Yang	14	21	17
Q3	(India) T Mannepalli	21	15	21

Quarter-finals
3	(France) T J Popov	16	21	21
Q3	(India) T Mannepalli	21	17	8

=== Bottom half ===
==== Section 3 ====
First round
(India) K George	21	19	21
(Finland) J Oldorff	18	21	16
(Thailand) K Wangcharoen	13	9
7	(China) Wang ZX	21	21
(Japan) K Takahashi	19	22	21
(South Korea) Jeon H-j	21	20	13
(Belgium) J Carraggi	17	13
4	(France) C Popov	21	21

Second round
(India) K George	18	13
7	(China) Wang ZX	21	21
(Japan) K Takahashi	21	6	25
4	(France) C Popov	16	21	23

Quarter-finals
7	(China) Wang ZX	19	21	17
(Japan) K Takahashi	21	11	21

==== Section 4 ====
First round
(Japan) T Obayashi	19	21	19
(Malaysia) J Hoh	21	19	21
(Republic of Ireland) N Nguyen	21	16	17
5	(Singapore) J Teh	19	21	21
(Chinese Taipei) Su L-y	21	13
(Malaysia) Cheam J W	23	21
Q4	(France) A Merkle	13	16
2	(Singapore) Loh K Y	21	21

Second round
(Malaysia) J Hoh	21	19	12
5	(Singapore) J Teh	18	21	21
(Malaysia) Cheam J W	21	13	12
2	(Singapore) Loh K Y	19	21	21

Quarter-finals
5	(Singapore) J Teh	10	14
2	(Singapore) Loh K Y	21	21

== Women's singles ==
=== Seeds ===
1. (Singapore) Yeo Jia Min (champion)
2. (United States) Beiwen Zhang (first round)
3. (Chinese Taipei) Sung Shuo-yun (second round)
4. (Denmark) Mia Blichfeldt (semi-finals)
5. (Denmark) Line Kjærsfeldt (first round)
6. (Vietnam) Nguyễn Thùy Linh (final)
7. (Denmark) Julie Dawall Jakobsen (withdrew)
8. (Scotland) Kirsty Gilmour (first round)

=== Finals ===
Semi-finals
1	(Singapore) Yeo Jia Min	21	22
4	(Denmark) Mia Blichfeldt	19	20
(Japan) Riko Gunji	17	19
6	(Vietnam) Nguyễn Thùy Linh	21	21

Final
1	(Singapore) Yeo Jia Min	21	21
6	(Vietnam) Nguyễn Thùy Linh	16	17

=== Top half ===
==== Section 1 ====
First round
1	(Singapore) Yeo J M	21	21
(Chinese Taipei) Huang Y-h	16	18
(Denmark) A Schulz	21	21	21
(Ukraine) P Buhrova	16	23	8
SWM	(Denmark) L Christophersen	20	21	21
(Malaysia) Letshanaa K	22	10	15
(Indonesia) K A C Dewi	12	17
(Japan) H Akechi	21	21

Second round
1	(Singapore) Yeo J M	21	21
(Denmark) A Schulz	10	18
SWM	(Denmark) L Christophersen	14	13
(Japan) H Akechi	21	21

Quarter-finals
1	(Singapore) Yeo J M	21	19	21
(Japan) H Akechi	8	21	18

==== Section 2 ====
First round
4	(Denmark) M Blichfeldt	21	21
Q1	(Czech Republic) T Švábíková	11	16
(India) T Hemanth	18	13
Q4	(Bulgaria) K Nalbantova	21	21
8	(Scotland) K Gilmour	21	17	19
(Hong Kong) Lo S Y	17	21	21
(India) R Ramraj	22	5	25
Q2	(Malaysia) S Kisona	20	21	23

Second round
4	(Denmark) M Blichfeldt	21	21
Q4	(Bulgaria) K Nalbantova	6	12
(Hong Kong) Lo S Y	17	11
(India) R Ramraj	21	21

Quarter-finals
4	(Denmark) M Blichfeldt	21	21
(India) R Ramraj	12	12

=== Bottom half ===
==== Section 3 ====
First round
(Canada) WY Zhang	13	17
Q3	(India) U Hooda	21	21
(Japan) A Takahashi	21	21
5	(Denmark) L Kjærsfeldt	15	16
(India) A Kharb	11	14
(Japan) R Gunji	21	21
(India) A Upadhyaya	18	27	18
3	(Chinese Taipei) Sung S-y	21	25	21

Second round
Q3	(India) U Hooda	21	21
(Japan) A Takahashi	13	19
(Japan) R Gunji	21	21
3	(Chinese Taipei) Sung S-y	17	17

Quarter-finals
Q3	(India) U Hooda	21	23	22
(Japan) R Gunji	15	25	24

==== Section 4 ====
First round
(India) A Kashyap	13	21	21
(India) I Baruah	21	18	19
(France) L Huet	18	9
6	(Vietnam) Nguyễn T L	21	21
(India) T Mir	20	21	21
PFQ	(Canada) R Chan	22	18	15
(Chinese Taipei) Tung C-t	w	/	o
2	(United States) BW Zhang

Second round
(India) A Kashyap	14	17
6	(Vietnam) Nguyễn T L	21	21
(India) T Mir	21	21
(Chinese Taipei) Tung C-t	17	15

Quarter-finals
6	(Vietnam) Nguyễn T L	19	21	7
(India) T Mir	21	12	0^{r}

== Men's doubles ==
=== Seeds ===
1. (England) Ben Lane / Sean Vendy (semi-finals)
2. (Denmark) Rasmus Kjær / Frederik Søgaard (quarter-finals)
3. (Malaysia) Junaidi Arif / Yap Roy King (quarter-finals)
4. (Chinese Taipei) Lee Fang-chih / Lee Fang-jen (quarter-finals)
5. (France) Christo Popov / Toma Junior Popov (final)
6. (Denmark) Andreas Søndergaard / Jesper Toft (first round)
7. (South Korea) Kim Won-ho / Seo Seung-jae (champions)
8. (Malaysia) Nur Mohd Azriyn Ayub / Tan Wee Kiong (first round)

=== Finals ===
Semi-finals
1	(England) Ben Lane (England) Sean Vendy	14	19
7	(South Korea) Kim Won-ho (South Korea) Seo Seung-jae	21	21
5	(France) Christo Popov (France) Toma Junior Popov	21	22
(Japan) Takumi Nomura (Japan) Yuichi Shimogami	13	20

Final
7	(South Korea) Kim Won-ho (South Korea) Seo Seung-jae	21	21
5	(France) Christo Popov (France) Toma Junior Popov	19	17

=== Top half ===
==== Section 1 ====
First round
1	(England) B Lane (England) S Vendy	21	21
(China) Sun WJ (China) Zhu YJ	16	12
(India) H Amsakarunan (India) R Kumar	16	21	21
Q4	(Chinese Taipei) Su C-h (Chinese Taipei) Wu G-x	21	18	23
8	(Malaysia) N M Azriyn A (Malaysia) Tan W K	21	13	19
(Chinese Taipei) Lu M-c (Chinese Taipei) Tang K-w	19	21	21
Q3	(Chinese Taipei) Cheng C-k (Chinese Taipei) Lin B-w	21	21
(Algeria) K Mammeri (Algeria) Y S Medel	12	14

Second round
1	(England) B Lane (England) S Vendy	19	21	21
Q4	(Chinese Taipei) Su C-h (Chinese Taipei) Wu G-x	21	13	7
(Chinese Taipei) Lu M-c (Chinese Taipei) Tang K-w	22	21	10
Q3	(Chinese Taipei) Cheng C-k (Chinese Taipei) Lin B-w	24	17	21

Quarter-finals
1	(England) B Lane (England) S Vendy	21	21
Q3	(Chinese Taipei) Cheng C-k (Chinese Taipei) Lin B-w	11	14

==== Section 2 ====
First round
3	(Malaysia) J Arif (Malaysia) Yap R K	21	21	21
(Denmark) W K Boe (Denmark) C F Kjær	23	13	12
(Chinese Taipei) Chang K-c (Chinese Taipei) Po L-w	22	21
Q1	(France) M Cattoen (France) L Renoir	20	18
7	(South Korea) Kim W-h (South Korea) Seo S-j	21	21
PFQ	(Scotland) A Dunn (Scotland) A Pringle	16	18
(Chinese Taipei) Chiang C-w (Chinese Taipei) Wu H-y	14	18
(Germany) D Hess (Germany) M Seidel	21	21

Second round
3	(Malaysia) J Arif (Malaysia) Yap R K	21	22
(Chinese Taipei) Chang K-c (Chinese Taipei) Po L-w	17	20
7	(South Korea) Kim W-h (South Korea) Seo S-j	21	21
(Germany) D Hess (Germany) M Seidel	6	12

Quarter-finals
3	(Malaysia) J Arif (Malaysia) Yap R K	16	16
7	(South Korea) Kim W-h (South Korea) Seo S-j	21	21

=== Bottom half ===
==== Section 3 ====
First round
(Malaysia) Low H Y (Malaysia) Ng E C	14	14
(Scotland) C Grimley (Scotland) M Grimley	21	21
(Chinese Taipei) Chen Z-r (Chinese Taipei) Lin Y-c	19	23
5	(France) C Popov (France) T J Popov	21	25
(France) É Adam (France) L Rossi	16	21	21
(Germany) B Geiss (Germany) J C Völker	21	18	16
Q2	(France) J Maio (France) W Villeger	15	11
4	(Chinese Taipei) Lee F-c (Chinese Taipei) Lee F-j	21	21

Second round
(Scotland) C Grimley (Scotland) M Grimley	14	21	14
5	(France) C Popov (France) T J Popov	21	14	21
(France) É Adam (France) L Rossi	15	16
4	(Chinese Taipei) Lee F-c (Chinese Taipei) Lee F-j	21	21

Quarter-finals
5	(France) C Popov (France) T J Popov	21	21
4	(Chinese Taipei) Lee F-c (Chinese Taipei) Lee F-j	17	9

==== Section 4 ====
First round
(United States) Chen Z-y (United States) P Smith	21	21
(Malaysia) Kang K X (Malaysia) A Tai	19	18
(Japan) T Nomura (Japan) Y Shimogami	24	21
6	(Denmark) A Søndergaard (Denmark) J Toft	22	15
(India) P Roy (India) K S Pratheek	22	21
(England) C Hemming (England) Et van Leeuwen	20	19
(Denmark) D Lundgaard (Denmark) M Vestergaard	17	21	21
2	(Denmark) R Kjær (Denmark) F Søgaard	21	16	23

Second round
(United States) Chen Z-y (United States) P Smith	14	19
(Japan) T Nomura (Japan) Y Shimogami	21	21
(India) P Roy (India) K S Pratheek	21	14	14
2	(Denmark) R Kjær (Denmark) F Søgaard	19	21	21

Quarter-finals
(Japan) T Nomura (Japan) Y Shimogami	21	19	21
2	(Denmark) R Kjær (Denmark) F Søgaard	14	21	16

== Women's doubles ==
=== Seeds ===
1. (Bulgaria) Gabriela Stoeva / Stefani Stoeva (final)
2. (Chinese Taipei) Sung Shuo-yun / Yu Chien-hui (first round)
3. (Ukraine) Polina Buhrova / Yevheniia Kantemyr (first round)
4. (Scotland) Julie MacPherson / Ciara Torrance (quarter-finals)
5. (China) Chen Qingchen / Wang Tingge (second round)
6. (China) Li Wenmei / Wang Yiduo (semi-finals)
7. (Indonesia) Meilysa Trias Puspitasari / Rachel Allessya Rose (second round)
8. (Turkey) Nazlıcan İnci / Bengisu Erçetin (second round)

=== Finals ===
Semi-finals
1	(Bulgaria) Gabriela Stoeva (Bulgaria) Stefani Stoeva	21	11	21
6	(China) Li Wenmei (China) Wang Yiduo	17	21	17
(Chinese Taipei) Lin Xiao-min (Chinese Taipei) Wang Yu-qiao	12	22	17
(Japan) Mizuki Otake (Japan) Miyu Takahashi	21	20	21

Final
1	(Bulgaria) Gabriela Stoeva (Bulgaria) Stefani Stoeva	17	22	12
(Japan) Mizuki Otake (Japan) Miyu Takahashi	21	20	21

=== Top half ===
==== Section 1 ====
First round
1	(Bulgaria) G Stoeva (Bulgaria) S Stoeva	21	21
(Chinese Taipei) Chen S-y (Chinese Taipei) Hsieh Y-e	16	14
(France) M Lambert (France) C Pognante	21	21
Q1	(Bulgaria) M Mitsova (Bulgaria) K Nalbantova	18	15
7	(Indonesia) M T Puspita Sari (Indonesia) R A Rose	18	21	22
(Chinese Taipei) N G Chan (Chinese Taipei) Lin C-c	21	11	20
Q2	(Spain) N Carulla (Spain) C Jiménez	14	14
(Denmark) A C Kudsk (Denmark) S Schulz	21	21

Second round
1	(Bulgaria) G Stoeva (Bulgaria) S Stoeva	19	21	21
(France) M Lambert (France) C Pognante	21	19	5
7	(Indonesia) M T Puspita Sari (Indonesia) R A Rose	21	16	19
(Denmark) A C Kudsk (Denmark) S Schulz	11	21	21

Quarter-finals
1	(Bulgaria) G Stoeva (Bulgaria) S Stoeva	21	21
(Denmark) A C Kudsk (Denmark) S Schulz	9	7

==== Section 2 ====
First round
4	(Scotland) J MacPherson (Scotland) C Torrance	22	21
(Switzerland) L Amiguet (Switzerland) C Racloz	20	16
(France) T Margueritte (France) F Vallet	21	21
(France) S Bauer (France) E Vercelot	13	13
6	(China) Li WM (China) Wang YD	21	21
(Chinese Taipei) Hung H-e (Chinese Taipei) Lee C-c	19	13
(China) Luo Y (China) Wang ZM	21	21
PFQ	(Bulgaria) M Chepisheva (Bulgaria) T Popivanova	15	6

Second round
4	(Scotland) J MacPherson (Scotland) C Torrance	w	/	o
(France) T Margueritte (France) F Vallet
6	(China) Li WM (China) Wang YD	14	21	21
(China) Luo Y (China) Wang ZM	21	17	14

Quarter-finals
4	(Scotland) J MacPherson (Scotland) C Torrance	19	21	12
6	(China) Li WM (China) Wang YD	21	19	21

=== Bottom half ===
==== Section 3 ====
First round
(Chinese Taipei) Lin X-m (Chinese Taipei) Wang Y-q	21	21
(Brazil) J Lima (Brazil) S Lima	17	14
(England) A Harris (England) L Tolman	17	18
8	(Turkey) B Erçetin (Turkey) N İnci	21	21
(China) Keng SL (China) Li HZ	21	21
(Sweden) M Sjöö (Sweden) T Sjöö	12	11
(India) P Konjengbam (India) S Mishra	21	17	21
3	(Ukraine) P Buhrova (Ukraine) Y Kantemyr	18	21	18

Second round
(Chinese Taipei) Lin X-m (Chinese Taipei) Wang Y-q	21	21
8	(Turkey) B Erçetin (Turkey) N İnci	19	16
(China) Keng SL (China) Li HZ	21	21
(India) P Konjengbam (India) S Mishra	9	4

Quarter-finals
(Chinese Taipei) Lin X-m (Chinese Taipei) Wang Y-q	21	21
(China) Keng SL (China) Li HZ	16	19

==== Section 4 ====
First round
Q3	(Germany) S Hübsch (Germany) A Lehmann	12	14
(Malaysia) Go P K (Malaysia) Teoh M X	21	21
(Poland) P Hankiewicz (Poland) K Marczak	4	9
5	(China) Chen QC (China) Wang TG	21	21
Q4	(Netherlands) D Jille (Denmark) S Thygesen	21	21
(England) S Kelly (England) A Lado	14	12
(Japan) M Otake (Japan) M Takahashi	21	21
2	(Chinese Taipei) Sung S-y (Chinese Taipei) Yu C-h	13	15

Second round
(Malaysia) Go P K (Malaysia) Teoh M X	22	21
5	(China) Chen QC (China) Wang TG	20	12
Q4	(Netherlands) D Jille (Denmark) S Thygesen	11	14
(Japan) M Otake (Japan) M Takahashi	21	21

Quarter-finals
(Malaysia) Go P K (Malaysia) Teoh M X	9	13
(Japan) M Otake (Japan) M Takahashi	21	21

== Mixed doubles ==
=== Seeds ===
1. (Denmark) Jesper Toft / Amalie Magelund (first round)
2. (Malaysia) Hoo Pang Ron / Cheng Su Yin (second round)
3. (Chinese Taipei) Chen Cheng-kuan / Hsu Yin-hui (second round)
4. (Denmark) Mads Vestergaard / Christine Busch (second round)
5. (Singapore) Terry Hee / Jin Yujia (first round)
6. (China) Zhu Yijun / Zhang Chi (quarter-finals)
7. (Chinese Taipei) Ye Hong-wei / Nicole Gonzales Chan (second round)
8. (India) Dhruv Kapila / Tanisha Crasto (semi-finals)

=== Finals ===
Semi-finals
(Netherlands) Robin Tabeling (Denmark) Alexandra Bøje	21	19	21
(Denmark) Rasmus Espersen (Denmark) Amalie Cecilie Kudsk	19	21	16
(Indonesia) Rehan Naufal Kusharjanto (Indonesia) Gloria Emanuelle Widjaja	25	10	21
8	(India) Dhruv Kapila (India) Tanisha Crasto	23	21	15

Final
(Netherlands) Robin Tabeling (Denmark) Alexandra Bøje	21	21
(Indonesia) Rehan Naufal Kusharjanto (Indonesia) Gloria Emanuelle Widjaja	17	12

=== Top half ===
==== Section 1 ====
First round
1	(Denmark) J Toft (Denmark) A Magelund	10	18
(Indonesia) J Hidayatullah (Indonesia) F Pasaribu	21	21
Q2	(France) W Villeger (France) F Vallet
(India) A Surya (India) A Pramuthesh	w	/	o
7	(Chinese Taipei) Ye H-w (Chinese Taipei) N G Chan	18	21	21
(Indonesia) M Faza (Indonesia) A S P Pranata	21	15	13
(Indonesia) A Syahnawi (Indonesia) N V Marwah	18	20
(Netherlands) R Tabeling (Denmark) A Bøje	21	22

Second round
(Indonesia) J Hidayatullah (Indonesia) F Pasaribu	21	21
(India) A Surya (India) A Pramuthesh	10	17
7	(Chinese Taipei) Ye H-w (Chinese Taipei) N G Chan	22	16	12
(Netherlands) R Tabeling (Denmark) A Bøje	20	21	21

Quarter-finals
(Indonesia) J Hidayatullah (Indonesia) F Pasaribu	18	11
(Netherlands) R Tabeling (Denmark) A Bøje	21	21

==== Section 2 ====
First round
3	(Chinese Taipei) Chen C-k (Chinese Taipei) Hsu Y-h	21	21
Q1	(Brazil) F Farias (Brazil) J Lima	18	13
(Denmark) R Espersen (Denmark) A C Kudsk	22	21	21
(England) G Mairs (England) J Mairs	24	15	17
5	(Singapore) T Hee (Singapore) Jin YJ	21	22	19
(Malaysia) Wong T C (Malaysia) Lim C S	15	24	21
(England) C Hemming (England) Es van Leeuwen	21	19	20
(United States) P Smith (United States) J Gai	18	21	22

Second round
3	(Chinese Taipei) Chen C-k (Chinese Taipei) Hsu Y-h	21	18	13
(Denmark) R Espersen (Denmark) A C Kudsk	12	21	21
(Malaysia) Wong T C (Malaysia) Lim C S	20	19
(United States) P Smith (United States) J Gai	22	21

Quarter-finals
(Denmark) R Espersen (Denmark) A C Kudsk	21	21
(United States) P Smith (United States) J Gai	13	11

=== Bottom half ===
==== Section 3 ====
First round
(France) J Maio (France) L Palermo	16	8
(Japan) Y Shimogami (Japan) S Hobara	21	21
Q4	(Germany) J C Völker (Germany) F Volkmann	7	10
6	(China) Zhu YJ (China) Zhang C	21	21
(Indonesia) A Maulana (Indonesia) I C S Jamil	13	18
(Indonesia) R N Kusharjanto (Indonesia) G E Widjaja	21	21
(Spain) R Garcia (Spain) L Rodríguez	19	16
4	(Denmark) M Vestergaard (Denmark) C Busch	21	21

Second round
(Japan) Y Shimogami (Japan) S Hobara	12	21	20
6	(China) Zhu YJ (China) Zhang C	21	16	22
(Indonesia) R N Kusharjanto (Indonesia) G E Widjaja	21	21
4	(Denmark) M Vestergaard (Denmark) C Busch	19	13

Quarter-finals
6	(China) Zhu YJ (China) Zhang C	28	16	17
(Indonesia) R N Kusharjanto (Indonesia) G E Widjaja	26	21	21

==== Section 4 ====
First round
(Scotland) A Dunn (Scotland) J MacPherson	18	11
(Germany) J R Jansen (Germany) T P Nguyen	21	21
(India) R Kapoor (India) R Gadde	16	21	17
8	(India) D Kapila (India) T Crasto	21	18	21
(China) Gao JX (China) Wu MY	25	21
Q3	(Chinese Taipei) Lin B-w (Chinese Taipei) Lee C-c	23	15
(Algeria) K Mammeri (Algeria) T Mammeri	11	15
2	(Malaysia) Hoo P R (Malaysia) Cheng S Y	21	21

Second round
(Germany) J R Jansen (Germany) T P Nguyen	10	19
8	(India) D Kapila (India) T Crasto	21	21
(China) Gao JX (China) Wu MY	17	21	21
2	(Malaysia) Hoo P R (Malaysia) Cheng S Y	21	11	16

Quarter-finals
8	(India) D Kapila (India) T Crasto	21	21
(China) Gao JX (China) Wu MY	14	17

Preceded by 2025 Thailand Masters	BWF World Tour; 2025 BWF season	Succeeded by 2025 Orléans Masters
