= Miyu Takahashi =

Japanese badminton player (born 2002)

Miyū Takahashi
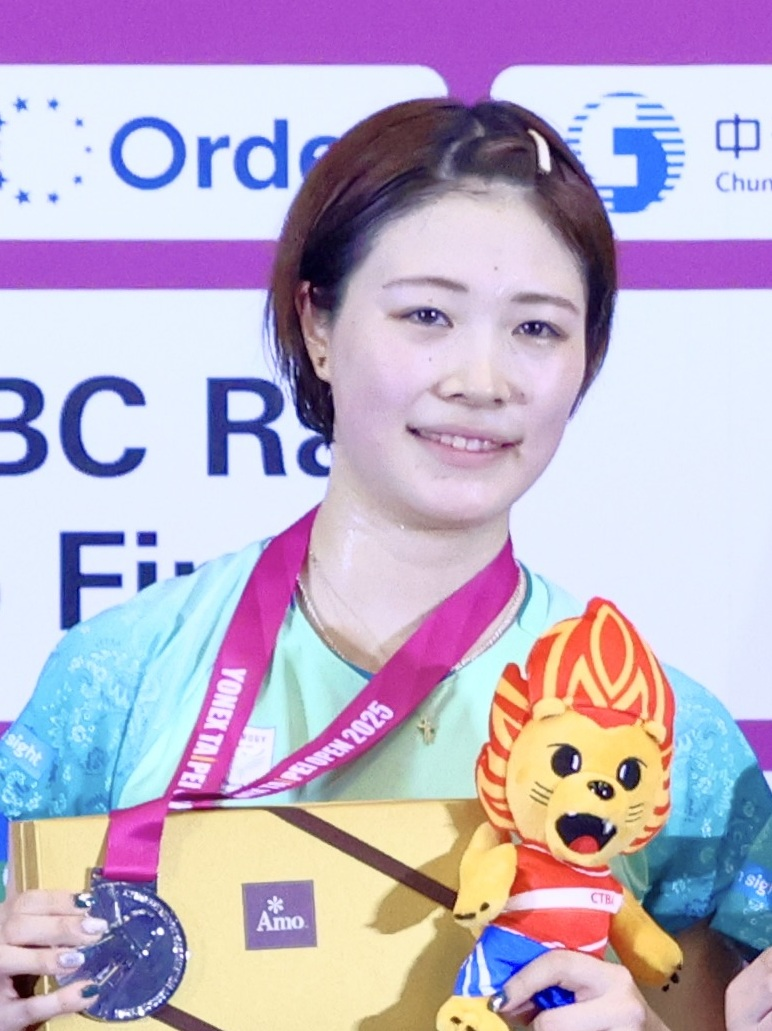
- Takahashi in 2025

Personal information
- Native name: 高橋 美優
- Born: 15 May 2002 (age 24) Inami, Hyōgo, Japan
- Height: 1.68 m (5 ft 6 in)

Sport
- Country: Japan
- Sport: Badminton
- Handedness: Left
- Coached by: Yuki Kaneko

Women's doubles
- Career record: 105 wins, 26 losses (80.15%)
- Highest ranking: 11 (with Sumire Nakade, 27 October 2026)
- Current ranking: 11 (with Sumire Nakade, 17 November 2026)
- BWF profile
Medal record
Women's badminton
Representing Japan
World Junior Championships
Bronze medal – third place	2018 Markham	Mixed team

Miyu Takahashi (高橋 美優, Takahashi Miyu; born 15 May 2002) is a Japanese badminton player who specializes in women's doubles. A member of the Japanese national team, she plays for the BIPROGY badminton team and has reached a career-high women's doubles world ranking of No. 11.

Partnering with Mizuki Otake, Takahashi won her first BWF World Tour title at the Vietnam Open and her first Super 300 title at the German Open. In 2026, she formed a new partnership with Sumire Nakade and won five World Tour titles, including the Super 750 China Masters and Super 300 titles at the Orléans Masters, U.S. Open, and Taipei Open.

== Early life ==
Born on 15 May 2002 in Inami, Kako District, Hyōgo Prefecture, Takahashi was raised in a family heavily involved in badminton and began playing the sport at the age of four. Her father, Kōji Takahashi, is a teacher and badminton coach at Yashiro High School, while her mother, Mika Takahashi, coaches at the Volano club and HOPE Junior. Her younger sister, Nana Takahashi, also competed professionally for the Toyota Motor corporate team before retiring in 2025.

She attended Inami Town Tenma Elementary School and trained with the local club, HOPE Junior. In 2012, she won the girls' singles A-zone title at the Hyogo Prefectural Elementary School Autumn Badminton Tournament. During her youth, she frequently competed alongside her parents, winning several regional parent-child doubles tournaments. She relocated to Aomori Prefecture for her secondary education and graduated from Aomori Yamada Junior and Senior High School.

== Career ==
=== 2018–2019: Junior career ===
In 2018, Takahashi represented Japan at the World Junior Championships, contributing to the team's bronze-medal finish in the mixed team event. In late 2018, she formed a partnership with Mizuki Otake. During her third year at Aomori Yamada High School, Takahashi won the girls' doubles event and placed third in singles at the Singapore Youth International. In 2019, she claimed the singles title at the All Japan Junior Championships and, alongside Otake, won the National High School Championships (Inter-High).

=== 2021–2023: International Challenge titles ===
Following her high school graduation, Takahashi joined the BIPROGY (formerly Nihon Unisys) badminton team in April 2021. In June 2022, Takahashi and Otake won the Japan Ranking Circuit and were subsequently selected for the Japanese B national team. Later that year, while Otake was dealing with a left ankle injury, Takahashi temporarily partnered with Chisato Hoshi. The duo won three consecutive International Challenge titles: India International (I), India International (II), and Maldives International.

In 2023, Takahashi resumed her partnership with Otake. They finished as runners-up at the Osaka International in April and won their first national title at the All Japan Members Championships in September. They made their World Tour debut at the Vietnam Open, exiting in the first round, and reached the quarterfinals of the Kaohsiung Masters.

=== 2024: First World Tour title ===
Takahashi and Otake claimed their first title of the year at the Northern Marianas Open in July . The following month, they were runners-up at the Indonesia Masters (Super 100). In September, they made their Super 300-level debut at the Taipei Open, reaching the quarterfinals, and subsequently secured their maiden BWF World Tour title at the Super 100 Vietnam Open. They later made their Super 500 debut at the Japan Masters, losing in the first round to the sixth-seeded pair, Jia Yifan and Zhang Shuxian. In November, they reached a career-high world ranking of No. 58. They finished the year by reaching the semifinals of the All Japan Championships, losing to the eventual champions Nami Matsuyama and Chiharu Shida.

=== 2025: Super 300 title and world top 30 ranking ===
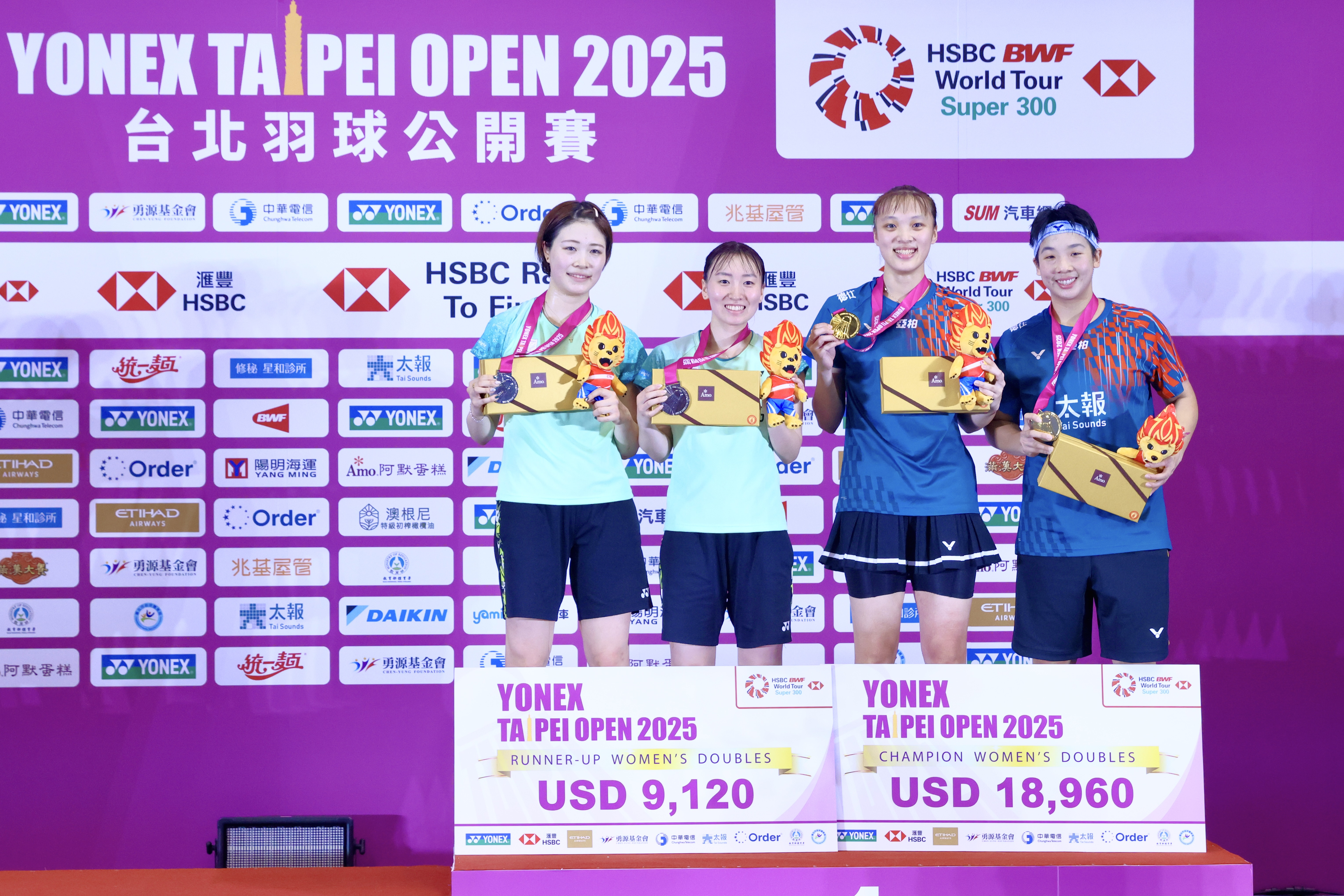
Takahashi and Otake on the podium as the runners-up at the 2025 Taipei Open.

In 2025, Takahashi and Otake were selected for the Japan National Team. They won their first Super 300 title at the German Open, defeating top seeds Gabriela Stoeva and Stefani Stoeva in the final. In May, they also reached the final of the Super 300 Taipei Open. Competing in higher-tier events, they reached the second round at both the Japan Open and the China Open in July, and achieved a career-high world ranking of No. 22 on 29 July.

However, following the China Open, their partnership was interrupted by Otake's persistent hip injury. Otake had been unable to train properly for approximately six months, during which Takahashi trained individually. The pair returned to competition at the All Japan Championships in December, but were eliminated in the third round. With her injury still unresolved, Otake underwent hip surgery in January 2026.

=== 2026: Five titles in six finals ===
Takahashi and Nakade during the prize presentation at the 2026 China Masters.

Takahashi began the 2026 season partnering with Arisa Igarashi at the Super 500 Indonesia Masters. They reached the final, but withdrew before the match after Takahashi developed a fever, finishing as runners-up after conceding a walkover. In February, she represented Japan at the Asia Team Championships, where the team placed fifth. The following month, Takahashi formed a new partnership with Sumire Nakade. In their first tournament together, the pair won the Super 300 Orléans Masters, defeating Lin Chih-chun and Yang Chu-yun in the final. Takahashi and Nakade then secured two more consecutive titles. They won the Super 100 Baoji China Masters against the Malaysian pair Low Zi Yu and Noraqilah Maisarah, and followed it with a victory at the Super 300 U.S. Open, once again defeating Lin and Yang in the final. In August, Takahashi and Nakade claimed their fourth title at the Super 300 Taipei Open by beating the top-seeded Malaysian pair, Pearly Tan and Thinaah Muralitharan.

In September, Takahashi and Nakade won their first Super 750 title at the China Masters, defeating China's Bao Lijing and Cao Zihan in the final. En route to the title, they defeated 2026 World Championships bronze medallists Li Yijing and Luo Xumin in the first round. They also became the first unseeded women's doubles champions at the tournament since Bao Yixin and Yu Xiaohan in 2017. In October, Takahashi and Nakade reached the semifinals of the Denmark Open, where they lost to compatriots Hinata Suzuki and Nao Yamakita. One month later, Takahashi and Nakade got to the final of Hong Kong Open but lost against Malaysian's Pearly Tan and Thinaah Muralitharan in straight games.

== Playing style ==
During the 2026 China Masters, commentators Gillian Clark and Steen Pedersen described Takahashi as attack-minded. They praised her technical ability and awareness of gaps in her opponents' coverage, noting her use of patient shots to establish a favourable attacking position. During the final, they highlighted her left-handed attack, disguised drop shots, and effective angled smashes. They also praised her willingness to reach far to her backhand side to intercept the shuttle.

== Achievements ==
=== BWF World Tour (7 titles, 4 runners-up) ===
The BWF World Tour, which was announced on 19 March 2017 and implemented in 2018, is a series of elite badminton tournaments sanctioned by the Badminton World Federation (BWF). The BWF World Tours are divided into levels of World Tour Finals, Super 1000, Super 750, Super 500, Super 300 (part of the HSBC World Tour), and the BWF Tour Super 100.

Women's doubles
Year	Tournament	Level	Partner	Opponent	Score	Result	Ref.
2024 (I)	Indonesia Masters	Super 100	(Japan) Mizuki Otake	(Indonesia) Jesita Putri Miantoro (Indonesia) Febi Setianingrum	15–21, 13–21	(silver) Runner-up	
2024	Vietnam Open	Super 100	(Japan) Mizuki Otake	(Thailand) Tidapron Kleebyeesun (Thailand) Nattamon Laisuan	19–21, 22–20, 21–7	(gold) Winner	
2025	German Open	Super 300	(Japan) Mizuki Otake	(Bulgaria) Gabriela Stoeva (Bulgaria) Stefani Stoeva	21–17, 20–22, 21–12	(gold) Winner	
2025	Taipei Open	Super 300	(Japan) Mizuki Otake	(Chinese Taipei) Hsieh Pei-shan (Chinese Taipei) Hung En-tzu	14–21, 15–21	(silver) Runner-up	
2026	Indonesia Masters	Super 500	(Japan) Arisa Igarashi	(Malaysia) Pearly Tan (Malaysia) Thinaah Muralitharan	Walkover	(silver) Runner-up	
2026	Orléans Masters	Super 300	(Japan) Sumire Nakade	(Chinese Taipei) Lin Chih-chun (Chinese Taipei) Yang Chu-yun	22–20, 12–21, 21–18	(gold) Winner	
2026	Baoji China Masters	Super 100	(Japan) Sumire Nakade	(Malaysia) Low Zi Yu (Malaysia) Noraqilah Maisarah	21–13, 21–17	(gold) Winner	
2026	U.S. Open	Super 300	(Japan) Sumire Nakade	(Chinese Taipei) Lin Chih-chun (Chinese Taipei) Yang Chu-yun	21–16, 21–10	(gold) Winner	
2026	Taipei Open	Super 300	(Japan) Sumire Nakade	(Malaysia) Pearly Tan (Malaysia) Thinaah Muralitharan	21–16, 21–18	(gold) Winner	
2026	China Masters	Super 750	(Japan) Sumire Nakade	(China) Bao Lijing (China) Cao Zihan	21–18, 21–18	(gold) Winner	
2026	Hong Kong Open	Super 500	(Japan) Sumire Nakade	(Malaysia) Pearly Tan (Malaysia) Thinaah Muralitharan	20–22, 16–21	(silver) Runner-up	

=== BWF International Challenge/Series (4 titles, 1 runner-up) ===
Women's doubles
Year	Tournament	Partner	Opponent	Score	Result	Ref.
2022 (I)	India International	(Japan) Chisato Hoshi	(Japan) Miho Kayama (Japan) Kaho Osawa	21–18, 19–21, 21–16	(gold) Winner	
2022 (II)	India International	(Japan) Chisato Hoshi	(India) Pooja Dandu (India) Arathi Sara Sunil	12–21, 21–12, 21–7	(gold) Winner	
2022	Maldives International	(Japan) Chisato Hoshi	(Japan) Kaho Osawa (Japan) Kaoru Sugiyama	21–16, 21–15	(gold) Winner	
2023	Osaka International	(Japan) Mizuki Otake	(South Korea) Lee Yu-lim (South Korea) Shin Seung-chan	23–21, 21–13	(silver) Runner-up	
2024	Northern Marianas Open	(Japan) Mizuki Otake	(Japan) Miki Kanehiro (Japan) Rui Kiyama	21–4, 21–10	(gold) Winner	

BWF International Challenge tournament

== Performance timeline ==
Key

W	Won	F	Finalist	SF	Semi-finalist
QF	Quarter-finalist	#R	Rounds 4, 3, 2, 1	RR	Round-robin stage
Q#	Qualification round	A	Absent	w/d	Withdrew
G	Gold	S	Silver	B	Bronze
NH	Not held	N/A	Not applicable	DNQ	Did not qualify

=== National team ===
- Junior level

Team events	2018	Ref.
World Junior Championships	B	

- Senior level

Team events	2026	Ref.
Asia Team Championships	5th	

=== Individual competitions ===
- Junior level

Events	2018	Ref.
World Junior Championships	2R	

- Senior level

Event	2025	2026	Ref.
Asian Championships	1R	DNQ	
World Championships	w/d	DNQ	

Tournament	BWF World Tour				Best	Ref.
Tournament	2023	2024	2025	2026	Best	Ref.
Indonesia Masters	A			F	F ('26)	
German Open	A		W	A	W ('25)	
Ruichang China Masters	A	2R	A		2R ('24)	
Orléans Masters	A		Q1	W	W ('26)	
Thailand Open	A		1R	A	1R ('25)	
Baoji China Masters	A			W	W ('26)	
U.S. Open	A			W	W ('26)	
Canada Open	A			1R	1R ('26)	
Japan Open	A		2R	A	2R ('25)	
China Open	A		2R	A	2R ('25)	
Taipei Open	A	QF	F	W	W ('26)	
Korea Masters	A			QF	QF ('26)	
China Masters	A			W	W ('26)	
Indonesia Masters Super 100	A	F	A		F ('24)	
Vietnam Open	1R	W	A		W ('24)	
Arctic Open	A			2R	2R ('26)	
Denmark Open	A			SF	SF ('26)	
French Open	A			2R	2R ('26)	
Japan Masters	A	1R	w/d	2R	2R ('26)	
Kaohsiung Masters	QF	A			QF ('23)	
Hong Kong Open	A			F	F ('26)	
Year-end ranking	148	59	52		52	
Tournament	2023	2024	2025	2026	Best	Ref.

== Wins over top-10 ranked pairs ==
Wins over pairs who were ranked in the world's top 10 at the time the match was played.

#	Partner	Opponents	Rk	Tournament	Rd	Score	Rk	Ref.
1	(Japan) Mizuki Otake	(China) Li Yijing (China) Luo Xumin	5	2025 Japan Open	1R	15–21, 21–17, 21–12	37	
2	(Japan) Sumire Nakade	(Chinese Taipei) Hsieh Pei-shan (Chinese Taipei) Hung En-tzu	10	2026 Taipei Open	2R	21–17, 22–20	71	
3	(Japan) Sumire Nakade	(Malaysia) Pearly Tan (Malaysia) Thinaah Muralitharan	5	2026 Taipei Open	F	21–16, 21–18	71	
4	(Japan) Sumire Nakade	(China) Li Yijing (China) Luo Xumin	8	2026 China Masters	1R	13–21, 21–17, 21–16	42	
5	(Japan) Sumire Nakade	(Bulgaria) Gabriela Stoeva (Bulgaria) Stefani Stoeva	9	2026 Hong Kong Open	2R	15–21, 21–18, 21–18	11	
6	(Japan) Sumire Nakade	(Japan) Rin Iwanaga (Japan) Kie Nakanishi	5	2026 Hong Kong Open	QF	21–19, 22–20	11	

== Record against selected opponents ==
Record against year-end Finals finalists, World Championships semi-finalists, and Olympic quarter-finalists. Accurate as of 5 September 2026.

=== Mizuki Otake ===
Players	M	W	L	Diff.
(Bulgaria) Gabriela Stoeva & Stefani Stoeva	1	1	0	+1
(China) Li Yijing & Luo Xumin	2	1	1	0

=== Sumire Nakade ===
Players	M	W	L	Diff.
(China) Li Yijing & Luo Xumin	1	1	0	+1
(India) Treesa Jolly & Gayatri Gopichand	1	1	0	+1
(Malaysia) Pearly Tan & Thinaah Muralitharan	1	1	0	+1
