= 2024 Japan Masters =

Badminton tournament in Japan

Tournament details
- Dates: 12–17 November
- Edition: 2nd
- Level: Super 500
- Total prize money: US$420,000
- Venue: Kumamoto Prefectural Gymnasium
- Location: Kumamoto, Japan

Champions
- Men's singles: (China) Li Shifeng
- Women's singles: (Japan) Akane Yamaguchi
- Men's doubles: (Indonesia) Fajar Alfian (Indonesia) Muhammad Rian Ardianto
- Women's doubles: (China) Liu Shengshu (China) Tan Ning
- Mixed doubles: (Thailand) Dechapol Puavaranukroh (Thailand) Supissara Paewsampran

The 2024 Japan Masters (officially known as the Kumamoto Masters Japan 2024) was a badminton tournament which took place at Kumamoto Prefectural Gymnasium in Kumamoto, Japan, from 12 to 17 November 2024 and had a total prize of $420,000.

== Tournament ==
The 2024 Japan Masters was the thirty-fifth tournament of the 2024 BWF World Tour and also part of the Japan Masters championships, which have been held since 2023. This tournament is organized by the Nippon Badminton Association with sanction from the BWF.

=== Venue ===
This tournament was held at Kumamoto Prefectural Gymnasium in Kumamoto, Japan.

=== Point distribution ===
Below is the point distribution table for each phase of the tournament based on the BWF points system for the BWF World Tour Super 500 event.

Winner	Runner-up	3/4	5/8	9/16	17/32	33/64	65/128
9,200	7,800	6,420	5,040	3,600	2,220	880	430

=== Prize pool ===
The total prize money is US$420,000 with the distribution of the prize money in accordance with BWF regulations.

Event	Winner	Finalist	Semi-finals	Quarter-finals	Last 16
Singles	$31,500	$15,960	$6,090	$2,520	$1,470
Doubles	$33,180	$15,960	$5,880	$3,045	$1,575

== Men's singles ==
=== Seeds ===
1. (Denmark) Viktor Axelsen (semi-finals)
2. (Japan) Kodai Naraoka (quarter-finals)
3. (Thailand) Kunlavut Vitidsarn (second round)
4. (Indonesia) Jonatan Christie (semi-finals)
5. (Malaysia) Lee Zii Jia (quarter-finals)
6. (Chinese Taipei) Chou Tien-chen (second round)
7. (China) Li Shifeng (champion)
8. (Indonesia) Anthony Sinisuka Ginting (withdrew)

=== Finals ===
Semi-finals
1	(Denmark) Viktor Axelsen	16	15
7	(China) Li Shifeng	21	21
4	(Indonesia) Jonatan Christie	21	18	20
(Malaysia) Leong Jun Hao	10	21	22

Final
7	(China) Li Shifeng	21	21
(Malaysia) Leong Jun Hao	10	13

=== Top half ===
==== Section 1 ====
First round
1	(Denmark) V Axelsen	21	21
(Chinese Taipei) Wang T-w	14	14
(China) Lei LX	21	21
(Singapore) Loh K Y	19	19
6	(Chinese Taipei) Chou T-c	17	21	21
(Canada) B Yang	21	19	17
(France) C Popov	21	21
Q2	(Indonesia) A Farhan	13	16

Second round
1	(Denmark) V Axelsen	14	21	21
(China) Lei LX	21	14	9
6	(Chinese Taipei) Chou T-c	21	14	18
(France) C Popov	10	21	21

Quarter-finals
1	(Denmark) V Axelsen	21	16	21
(France) C Popov	18	21	18

==== Section 2 ====
First round
3	(Thailand) K Vitidsarn	21	21
(Hong Kong) Ng K L	19	12
Q1	(Japan) M Koga	15	19
PFQ	(Chinese Taipei) Chi Y-j	21	21
7	(China) Li SF	19	21	21
(France) A Lanier	21	6	13
(Japan) K Nishimoto	21	21
(Japan) T Obayashi	16	18

Second round
3	(Thailand) K Vitidsarn	19	10
PFQ	(Chinese Taipei) Chi Y-j	21	21
7	(China) Li SF	21	21
(Japan) K Nishimoto	15	13

Quarter-finals
PFQ	(Chinese Taipei) Chi Y-j	21	11	7
7	(China) Li SF	19	21	21

=== Bottom half ===
==== Section 3 ====
First round
Q4	(Japan) K Takahashi	17	21	17
PFQ	(Chinese Taipei) Su L-y	21	19	21
Q3	(Malaysia) J Hoh	16	21	17
5	(Malaysia) Lee Z J	21	12	21
(Denmark) R Gemke	21	16	21
(Hong Kong) Lee C Y	10	21	14
(Japan) Y Tanaka	15	11
4	(Indonesia) J Christie	21	21

Second round
PFQ	(Chinese Taipei) Su L-y	21	8	16
5	(Malaysia) Lee Z J	19	21	21
(Denmark) R Gemke	20	17
4	(Indonesia) J Christie	22	21

Quarter-finals
5	(Malaysia) Lee Z J	21	18	18
4	(Indonesia) J Christie	12	21	21

==== Section 4 ====
First round
(India) L Sen	22	17	16
(Malaysia) Leong J H	20	21	21
(Indonesia) C A Dwi Wardoyo	12	21	18
SWM	(Japan) K Watanabe	21	18	21
(France) T J Popov	22	21
(China) Lu GZ	20	10
(Chinese Taipei) Lee C-h	22	16
2	(Japan) K Naraoka	24	21

Second round
(Malaysia) Leong J H	21	16	21
SWM	(Japan) K Watanabe	10	21	13
(France) T J Popov	22	9
2	(Japan) K Naraoka	24	21

Quarter-finals
(Malaysia) Leong J H	21	9	21
2	(Japan) K Naraoka	17	21	16

== Women's singles ==
=== Seeds ===
1. (China) Wang Zhiyi (second round)
2. (Japan) Akane Yamaguchi (champion)
3. (Chinese Taipei) Tai Tzu-ying (withdrew)
4. (China) Han Yue (second round)
5. (Indonesia) Gregoria Mariska Tunjung (final)
6. (Japan) Aya Ohori (quarter-finals)
7. (Thailand) Supanida Katethong (quarter-finals)
8. (Thailand) Busanan Ongbamrungphan (first round)

=== Finals ===
Semi-finals
(South Korea) Sim Yu-jin	21	17	19
5	(Indonesia) Gregoria Mariska Tunjung	18	21	21
(Thailand) Pornpawee Chochuwong	9	21	18
2	(Japan) Akane Yamaguchi	21	12	21

Final
5	(Indonesia) Gregoria Mariska Tunjung	12	12
2	(Japan) Akane Yamaguchi	21	21

=== Top half ===
==== Section 1 ====
First round
1	(China) Wang ZY	21	21
(Thailand) P Choeikeewong	14	12
(South Korea) Sim Y-j	21	21
Q1	(United States) L Lam	17	5
8	(Thailand) B Ongbamrungphan	12	8
(India) P. V. Sindhu	21	21
(Japan) N Nidaira	20	12
(Canada) M Li	22	21

Second round
1	(China) Wang ZY	24	18
(South Korea) Sim Y-j	26	21
(India) P. V. Sindhu	21	16	17
(Canada) M Li	17	21	21

Quarter-finals
(South Korea) Sim Y-j	16	21	21
(Canada) M Li	21	9	15

==== Section 2 ====
First round
PFQ	(Japan) H Akechi	10	21	19
Q3	(Japan) M Suizu	21	18	21
(Denmark) M Blichfeldt	21	21
PFQ	(Indonesia) K A C Dewi	12	14
5	(Indonesia) G M Tunjung	21	21
(Japan) T Miyazaki	15	12
Q2	(Japan) A Takahashi	7	20
(Thailand) R Intanon	21	22

Second round
Q3	(Japan) M Suizu
(Denmark) M Blichfeldt	w	/	o
5	(Indonesia) G M Tunjung	21	21
(Thailand) R Intanon	14	15

Quarter-finals
(Denmark) M Blichfeldt	16	18
5	(Indonesia) G M Tunjung	21	21

=== Bottom half ===
==== Section 3 ====
First round
(Denmark) L Kjærsfeldt	21	21
(Singapore) Yeo J M	14	13
(Chinese Taipei) Sung S-y	21	11	7
7	(Thailand) S Katethong	12	21	21
(Chinese Taipei) Pai Y-p	16	7
(Thailand) P Chochuwong	21	21
(Chinese Taipei) Lin H-t	18	10
4	(China) Han Y	21	21

Second round
(Denmark) L Kjærsfeldt	15	18
7	(Thailand) S Katethong	21	21
(Thailand) P Chochuwong	17	21	21
4	(China) Han Y	21	12	14

Quarter-finals
7	(Thailand) S Katethong	19	11
(Thailand) P Chochuwong	21	21

==== Section 4 ====
First round
(Japan) R Gunji	18	21	21
(Indonesia) P K Wardani	21	10	14
(Chinese Taipei) Chiu P-c	21	12	19
6	(Japan) A Ohori	14	21	21
(Germany) Y Li	12	6
Q4	(Hong Kong) Lo S Y	21	21
(Denmark) L Christophersen	13	19
2	(Japan) A Yamaguchi	21	21

Second round
(Japan) R Gunji	17	14
6	(Japan) A Ohori	21	21
Q4	(Hong Kong) Lo S Y	12	8
2	(Japan) A Yamaguchi	21	21

Quarter-finals
6	(Japan) A Ohori	21	15	13
2	(Japan) A Yamaguchi	18	21	21

== Men's doubles ==
=== Seeds ===
1. (China) Liang Weikeng / Wang Chang (withdrew)
2. (China) He Jiting / Ren Xiangyu (second round)
3. (Indonesia) Fajar Alfian / Muhammad Rian Ardianto (champions)
4. (Malaysia) Aaron Chia / Soh Wooi Yik (second round)
5. (Malaysia) Goh Sze Fei / Nur Izzuddin (second round)
6. (Japan) Takuro Hoki / Yugo Kobayashi (final)
7. (Chinese Taipei) Lee Jhe-huei / Yang Po-hsuan (first round)
8. (Indonesia) Muhammad Shohibul Fikri / Daniel Marthin (quarter-finals)

=== Finals ===
Semi-finals
3	(Indonesia) Fajar Alfian (Indonesia) Muhammad Rian Ardianto	21	21
SWM	(Indonesia) Leo Rolly Carnando (Indonesia) Bagas Maulana	18	13
(Malaysia) Nur Mohd Azriyn Ayub (Malaysia) Tan Wee Kiong	12	15
6	(Japan) Takuro Hoki (Japan) Yugo Kobayashi	21	21

Final
3	(Indonesia) Fajar Alfian (Indonesia) Muhammad Rian Ardianto	21	17	21
6	(Japan) Takuro Hoki (Japan) Yugo Kobayashi	15	21	17

=== Top half ===
==== Section 1 ====
First round
3	(Indonesia) F Alfian (Indonesia) M R Ardianto	25	21
PFQ	(United States) Chen Z-y (United States) P Smith	23	11
(France) C Popov (France) T J Popov	18	23	19
(Malaysia) Man W C (Malaysia) Tee K W	21	21	21
8	(Indonesia) M S Fikri (Indonesia) D Marthin	21	16	21
PFQ	(Chinese Taipei) Chen Z-r (Chinese Taipei) Lin Y-c	13	21	17
(Chinese Taipei) Liu K-h (Chinese Taipei) Yang P-ha	21	21
(Malaysia) Choong H J (Malaysia) M Haikal	15	17

Second round
3	(Indonesia) F Alfian (Indonesia) M R Ardianto	21	19	21
(Malaysia) Man W C (Malaysia) Tee K W	17	21	19
8	(Indonesia) M S Fikri (Indonesia) D Marthin	21	21
(Chinese Taipei) Liu K-h (Chinese Taipei) Yang P-ha	13	18

Quarter-finals
3	(Indonesia) F Alfian (Indonesia) M R Ardianto	17	21	21
8	(Indonesia) M S Fikri (Indonesia) D Marthin	21	16	18

==== Section 2 ====
First round
7	(Chinese Taipei) Lee J-h (Chinese Taipei) Yang P-hs	19	21	18
Q1	(Japan) T Nomura (Japan) Y Shimogami	21	17	21
(China) Xie HN (China) Zeng WH	14	14
(China) Chen BY (China) Liu Y	21	21
SWM	(Indonesia) L R Carnando (Indonesia) B Maulana	15	21	21
(Chinese Taipei) Lee F-c (Chinese Taipei) Lee F-j	21	15	13
(Denmark) R Kjær (Denmark) F Søgaard	19	13
(Japan) K Mitsuhashi (Japan) H Okamura	21	21

Second round
Q1	(Japan) T Nomura (Japan) Y Shimogami	17	16
(China) Chen BY (China) Liu Y	21	21
SWM	(Indonesia) L R Carnando (Indonesia) B Maulana	21	21
(Japan) K Mitsuhashi (Japan) H Okamura	19	12

Quarter-finals
(China) Chen BY (China) Liu Y	15	15
SWM	(Indonesia) L R Carnando (Indonesia) B Maulana	21	21

=== Bottom half ===
==== Section 3 ====
First round
(Malaysia) N M Azriyn A (Malaysia) Tan W K	21	21
(Chinese Taipei) Chang K-c (Chinese Taipei) Chen X-y	9	18
(Chinese Taipei) Lin B-w (Chinese Taipei) Su C-h	12	17
5	(Malaysia) Goh S F (Malaysia) N Izzuddin	21	21
Q3	(Malaysia) Low H Y (Malaysia) Ng E C	14	19
(Chinese Taipei) Chiu H-c (Chinese Taipei) Wang C-l	21	21
(Denmark) D Lundgaard (Denmark) M Vestergaard	21	17	9
4	(Malaysia) A Chia (Malaysia) Soh W Y	15	21	21

Second round
(Malaysia) N M Azriyn A (Malaysia) Tan W K	21	23
5	(Malaysia) Goh S F (Malaysia) N Izzuddin	9	21
(Chinese Taipei) Chiu H-c (Chinese Taipei) Wang C-l	21	21
4	(Malaysia) A Chia (Malaysia) Soh W Y	11	13

Quarter-finals
(Malaysia) N M Azriyn A (Malaysia) Tan W K	21	21
(Chinese Taipei) Chiu H-c (Chinese Taipei) Wang C-l	19	19

==== Section 4 ====
First round
Q4	(Chinese Taipei) Chiang C-w (Chinese Taipei) Wei C-w	21	16	10
(Indonesia) S K Gutama (Indonesia) M R P Isfahani	12	21	21
(Malaysia) J Arif (Malaysia) Yap R K	14	15
6	(Japan) T Hoki (Japan) Y Kobayashi	21	21
(South Korea) Jin Y (South Korea) Seo S-j	21	21
Q2	(Japan) A Endo (Japan) Y Takei	14	15
(Thailand) P Sukphun (Thailand) P Teeraratsakul	21	14	12
2	(China) He JT (China) Ren XY	18	21	21

Second round
(Indonesia) S K Gutama (Indonesia) M R P Isfahani	19	20
6	(Japan) T Hoki (Japan) Y Kobayashi	21	22
(South Korea) Jin Y (South Korea) Seo S-j	21	21
2	(China) He JT (China) Ren XY	10	14

Quarter-finals
6	(Japan) T Hoki (Japan) Y Kobayashi	21	29
(South Korea) Jin Y (South Korea) Seo S-j	18	27

== Women's doubles ==
=== Seeds ===
1. (South Korea) Baek Ha-na / Lee So-hee (withdrew)
2. (China) Liu Shengshu / Tan Ning (champions)
3. (Japan) Nami Matsuyama / Chiharu Shida (semi-finals)
4. (Japan) Rin Iwanaga / Kie Nakanishi (first round)
5. (Malaysia) Pearly Tan / Thinaah Muralitharan (first round)
6. (China) Jia Yifan / Zhang Shuxian (quarter-finals)
7. (China) Li Yijing / Luo Xumin (semi-finals)
8. (Indonesia) Febriana Dwipuji Kusuma / Amallia Cahaya Pratiwi (second round)

=== Finals ===
Semi-finals
(Japan) Yuki Fukushima (Japan) Mayu Matsumoto	21	21
7	(China) Li Yijing (China) Luo Xumin	15	11
3	(Japan) Nami Matsuyama (Japan) Chiharu Shida	12	18
2	(China) Liu Shengshu (China) Tan Ning	21	21

Final
(Japan) Yuki Fukushima (Japan) Mayu Matsumoto	15	5
2	(China) Liu Shengshu (China) Tan Ning	21	21

=== Top half ===
==== Section 1 ====
First round
4	(Japan) R Iwanaga (Japan) K Nakanishi	21	11	16
(South Korea) Lee Y-w (South Korea) Lee Y-l	13	21	21
(Japan) R Hirokami (Japan) Y Kato	21	21
(Chinese Taipei) Lee C-c (Chinese Taipei) Lin Y-y	12	15
5	(Malaysia) P Tan (Malaysia) Thinaah M	9	21	21
(Japan) Y Fukushima (Japan) M Matsumoto	21	14	23
Q3	(Japan) K Osawa (Japan) M Tanabe	21	21
(Malaysia) V Hoo (Malaysia) Lim C S	17	16

Second round
(South Korea) Lee Y-w (South Korea) Lee Y-l	21	21
(Japan) R Hirokami (Japan) Y Kato	13	16
(Japan) Y Fukushima (Japan) M Matsumoto	21	21
Q3	(Japan) K Osawa (Japan) M Tanabe	17	18

Quarter-finals
(South Korea) Lee Y-w (South Korea) Lee Y-l	13	21	17
(Japan) Y Fukushima (Japan) M Matsumoto	21	18	21

==== Section 2 ====
First round
7	(China) Li YJ (China) Luo XM	21	21
PFQ	(Chinese Taipei) Hsieh P-s (Chinese Taipei) Hung E-t	19	13
(Indonesia) J P Miantoro (Indonesia) F Setianingrum	21	18	22
(South Korea) Jeong N-e (South Korea) Shin S-c	16	21	24
SWM	(Hong Kong) Yeung N T (Hong Kong) Yeung P L	21	22
(Australia) G Somerville (Australia) A Yu	11	20
(China) Keng SL (China) Li WM	12	15
Q4	(Chinese Taipei) Hu L-f (Chinese Taipei) Jheng Y-c	21	21

Second round
7	(China) Li YJ (China) Luo XM	21	18	21
(South Korea) Jeong N-e (South Korea) Shin S-c	11	21	16
SWM	(Hong Kong) Yeung N T (Hong Kong) Yeung P L	13	23
Q4	(Chinese Taipei) Hu L-f (Chinese Taipei) Jheng Y-c	21	25

Quarter-finals
7	(China) Li YJ (China) Luo XM	22	21
Q4	(Chinese Taipei) Hu L-f (Chinese Taipei) Jheng Y-c	20	19

=== Bottom half ===
==== Section 3 ====
First round
(South Korea) Kim H-j (South Korea) Kong H-y	18	21	21
(Thailand) B Aimsaard (Thailand) N Aimsaard	21	19	12
(Japan) K Ishikawa (Japan) M Konegawa	17	11
8	(Indonesia) F D Kusuma (Indonesia) A C Pratiwi	21	21
Q2	(Japan) M Kawazoe (Japan) H Konishi	9	16
Q1	(Japan) A Higashino (Japan) A Sakuramoto	21	21
(Indonesia) L T Mayasari (Indonesia) S F S Ramadhanti	21	11	16
3	(Japan) N Matsuyama (Japan) C Shida	17	21	21

Second round
(South Korea) Kim H-j (South Korea) Kong H-y	29	21	21
8	(Indonesia) F D Kusuma (Indonesia) A C Pratiwi	30	19	17
Q1	(Japan) A Higashino (Japan) A Sakuramoto	10	18
3	(Japan) N Matsuyama (Japan) C Shida	21	21

Quarter-finals
(South Korea) Kim H-j (South Korea) Kong H-y	13	15
3	(Japan) N Matsuyama (Japan) C Shida	21	21

==== Section 4 ====
First round
(Chinese Taipei) Sung S-y (Chinese Taipei) Yu C-h	7	21	18
(South Korea) Kim B-r (South Korea) Kim S-y	21	19	21
(Japan) M Otake (Japan) M Takahashi	17	0^{r}
6	(China) Jia YF (China) Zhang SX	21	0
(India) T Jolly (India) G Gopichand	16	16
(Chinese Taipei) Hsu Y-h (Chinese Taipei) Lin J-y	21	21
(Chinese Taipei) Chang C-h (Chinese Taipei) Yang C-t	15	15
2	(China) Liu SS (China) Tan N	21	21

Second round
(South Korea) Kim B-r (South Korea) Kim S-y	13	15
6	(China) Jia YF (China) Zhang SX	21	21
(Chinese Taipei) Hsu Y-h (Chinese Taipei) Lin J-y	18	11
2	(China) Liu SS (China) Tan N	21	21

Quarter-finals
6	(China) Jia YF (China) Zhang SX	21	11	16
2	(China) Liu SS (China) Tan N	17	21	21

== Mixed doubles ==
=== Seeds ===
1. (Hong Kong) Tang Chun Man / Tse Ying Suet (second round)
2. (Malaysia) Chen Tang Jie / Toh Ee Wei (first round)
3. (Malaysia) Goh Soon Huat / Shevon Jemie Lai (semi-finals)
4. (China) Cheng Xing / Zhang Chi (second round)
5. (Indonesia) Dejan Ferdinansyah / Gloria Emanuelle Widjaja (first round)
6. (Chinese Taipei) Yang Po-hsuan / Hu Ling-fang (first round)
7. (Indonesia) Rinov Rivaldy / Pitha Haningtyas Mentari (second round)
8. (Denmark) Jesper Toft / Amalie Magelund (first round)

=== Finals ===
Semi-finals
(China) Guo Xinwa (China) Chen Fanghui	14	11
(France) Thom Gicquel (France) Delphine Delrue	21	21
3	(Malaysia) Goh Soon Huat (Malaysia) Shevon Jemie Lai	21	20	14
(Thailand) Dechapol Puavaranukroh (Thailand) Supissara Paewsampran	18	22	21

Final
(France) Thom Gicquel (France) Delphine Delrue	16	21	17
(Thailand) Dechapol Puavaranukroh (Thailand) Supissara Paewsampran	21	10	21

=== Top half ===
==== Section 1 ====
First round
1	(Hong Kong) Tang C M (Hong Kong) Tse Y S	21	21
(Chinese Taipei) Chen C-k (Chinese Taipei) Hsu Y-h	13	12
(China) Guo XW (China) Chen FH	21	21
Q2	(Chinese Taipei) Chiu H-c (Chinese Taipei) Lee C-c	5	12
8	(Denmark) J Toft (Denmark) A Magelund	20	21	12
(Malaysia) Wong T C (Malaysia) Lim C S	22	11	21
Q1	(Chinese Taipei) Chang K-c (Chinese Taipei) Lin Y-y	15	11
(United States) P Smith (United States) J Gai	21	21

Second round
1	(Hong Kong) Tang C M (Hong Kong) Tse Y S	18	23	15
(China) Guo XW (China) Chen FH	21	21	21
(Malaysia) Wong T C (Malaysia) Lim C S	21	14	16
(United States) P Smith (United States) J Gai	13	21	21

Quarter-finals
(China) Guo XW (China) Chen FH	21	21
(United States) P Smith (United States) J Gai	11	14

==== Section 2 ====
First round
4	(China) Cheng X (China) Zhang C	21	21
PFQ	(Chinese Taipei) Lu M-c (Chinese Taipei) Hung E-t	15	17
(France) T Gicquel (France) D Delrue	21	21
Q4	(Chinese Taipei) Liu K-h (Chinese Taipei) Jheng Y-c	15	12
6	(Chinese Taipei) Yang P-h (Chinese Taipei) Hu L-f	16	12
(Thailand) R Oupthong (Thailand) J Sudjaipraparat	21	21
(Japan) H Nishi (Japan) A Sato	21	21
(Chinese Taipei) Wu H-y (Chinese Taipei) Yang C-y	16	16

Second round
4	(China) Cheng X (China) Zhang C	13	17
(France) T Gicquel (France) D Delrue	21	21
(Thailand) R Oupthong (Thailand) J Sudjaipraparat	21	21
(Japan) H Nishi (Japan) A Sato	14	18

Quarter-finals
(France) T Gicquel (France) D Delrue	21	22
(Thailand) R Oupthong (Thailand) J Sudjaipraparat	14	20

=== Bottom half ===
==== Section 3 ====
First round
(Chinese Taipei) Lin B-w (Chinese Taipei) Lin C-c	21	14	19
(Indonesia) R N Kusharjanto (Indonesia) L A Kusumawati	15	21	21
(Japan) H Midorikawa (Japan) N Saito	21	21
5	(Indonesia) D Ferdinansyah (Indonesia) G E Widjaja	19	18
Q3	(Japan) K Ichikawa (Japan) M Kurashima	17	17
(China) Zhou ZH (China) Yang JY	21	21
(Japan) Y Watanabe (Japan) M Taguchi	21	12	14
3	(Malaysia) Goh S H (Malaysia) S J Lai	18	21	21

Second round
(Indonesia) R N Kusharjanto (Indonesia) L A Kusumawati	17	7
(Japan) H Midorikawa (Japan) N Saito	21	21
(China) Zhou ZH (China) Yang JY	19	11
3	(Malaysia) Goh S H (Malaysia) S J Lai	21	21

Quarter-finals
(Japan) H Midorikawa (Japan) N Saito	16	13
3	(Malaysia) Goh S H (Malaysia) S J Lai	21	21

==== Section 4 ====
First round
(Malaysia) Hoo P R (Malaysia) Cheng S Y	21	21
(Japan) Y Shimogami (Japan) S Hobara	18	19
(Thailand) S Jomkoh (Thailand) S Taerattanachai	13	18
7	(Indonesia) R Rivaldy (Indonesia) P H Mentari	21	21
(Denmark) M Vestergaard (Denmark) C Busch	15	14
(Netherlands) R Tabeling (Denmark) A Bøje	21	21
(Thailand) D Puavaranukroh (Thailand) S Paewsampran	21	21
2	(Malaysia) Chen T J (Malaysia) Toh E W	15	12

Second round
(Malaysia) Hoo P R (Malaysia) Cheng S Y	18	24	21
7	(Indonesia) R Rivaldy (Indonesia) P H Mentari	21	22	10
(Netherlands) R Tabeling (Denmark) A Bøje	12	21	19
(Thailand) D Puavaranukroh (Thailand) S Paewsampran	21	17	21

Quarter-finals
(Malaysia) Hoo P R (Malaysia) Cheng S Y	17	16
(Thailand) D Puavaranukroh (Thailand) S Paewsampran	21	21

Preceded by 2024 Korea Masters	BWF World Tour; 2024 BWF season	Succeeded by 2024 China Masters
