= 2025 Japan Open =

Badminton tournament in Japan

Tournament details
- Dates: 15–20 July
- Edition: 42nd
- Level: Super 750
- Total prize money: US$950,000
- Venue: Tokyo Metropolitan Gymnasium
- Location: Tokyo, Japan

Champions
- Men's singles: (China) Shi Yuqi
- Women's singles: (South Korea) An Se-young
- Men's doubles: (South Korea) Kim Won-ho (South Korea) Seo Seung-jae
- Women's doubles: (China) Liu Shengshu (China) Tan Ning
- Mixed doubles: (China) Jiang Zhenbang (China) Wei Yaxin
- Official website: daihatsu-japan-open.com/2025/

The 2025 Japan Open (officially known as the Daihatsu Japan Open 2025) was a badminton tournament which took place at Tokyo Metropolitan Gymnasium in Tokyo, Japan, from 15 to 20 July 2025. The total prize money was $950,000.

== Tournament ==
The 2025 Japan Open was the seventeenth tournament of the 2025 BWF World Tour and also part of the Japan Open championships, which have been held since 1982. This tournament was organized by the Nippon Badminton Association with sanction from the BWF.

=== Venue ===
This international tournament was held at Tokyo Metropolitan Gymnasium in Tokyo, Japan.

=== Point distribution ===
Below was the point distribution table for each phase of the tournament based on the BWF points system for the BWF World Tour Super 750 event.

Winner	Runner-up	3/4	5/8	9/16	17/32
11,000	9,350	7,700	6,050	4,320	2,660

=== Prize pool ===
The total prize money will be US$950,000 with the distribution of the prize money in accordance with BWF regulations.

Event	Winner	Finalist	Semi-finals	Quarter-finals	Last 16	Last 32
Singles	$66,500	$32,300	$13,300	$5,225	$2,850	$950
Doubles	$70,300	$33,250	$13,300	$5,937.50	$3,087.50	$950

== Men's singles ==
=== Seeds ===
1. (Thailand) Kunlavut Vitidsarn (first round)
2. (Denmark) Anders Antonsen (first round)
3. (China) Shi Yuqi (champion)
4. (Indonesia) Jonatan Christie (first round)
5. (China) Li Shifeng (second round)
6. (Chinese Taipei) Chou Tien-chen (second round)
7. (Japan) Kodai Naraoka (quarter-finals)
8. (France) Alex Lanier (final)

=== Finals ===
Semi-finals
(Japan) Koki Watanabe	19	15
8	(France) Alex Lanier	21	21
3	(China) Shi Yuqi	21	28
(France) Christo Popov	12	26

Final
8	(France) Alex Lanier	17	15
3	(China) Shi Yuqi	21	21

=== Top half ===
==== Section 1 ====
First round
1	(Thailand) K Vitidsarn	13	19
(China) Weng HY	21	21
(Chinese Taipei) Lin C-y	21	21
(China) Lu GZ	11	18
6	(Chinese Taipei) Chou T-c	6	21	21
(Singapore) J Teh	21	10	12
(Japan) K Watanabe	22	21
(Republic of Ireland) N Nguyen	20	13

Second round
(China) Weng HY	21	21
(Chinese Taipei) Lin C-y	13	19
6	(Chinese Taipei) Chou T-c	21	22	17
(Japan) K Watanabe	16	24	21

Quarter-finals
(China) Weng HY	21	15	11
(Japan) K Watanabe	15	21	21

==== Section 2 ====
First round
4	(Indonesia) J Christie	13	12
(Japan) K Nishimoto	21	21
(Japan) Y Tanaka	9	17
(Chinese Taipei) Chi Y-j	21	21
8	(France) A Lanier	21	21
(Malaysia) Leong J H	12	14
(Indonesia) A Farhan	21	21
(Chinese Taipei) Lee C-h	18	11

Second round
(Japan) K Nishimoto	19	7
(Chinese Taipei) Chi Y-j	21	21
8	(France) A Lanier	14	21	21
(Indonesia) A Farhan	21	15	18

Quarter-finals
(Chinese Taipei) Chi Y-j	16	14
8	(France) A Lanier	21	21

=== Bottom half ===
==== Section 3 ====
First round
PFR	(Thailand) K Wangcharoen	21	13
(Chinese Taipei) Wang T-w	23	21
(Hong Kong) Lee C Y	10	20
5	(China) Li SF	21	22
(Hong Kong) Ng K L	20	21	21
(Canada) B Yang	22	18	15
(France) T J Popov	15	21	9
3	(China) Shi YQ	21	17	21

Second round
(Chinese Taipei) Wang T-w	17	11
5	(China) Li SF	21	3^{r}
(Hong Kong) Ng K L	16	21	16
3	(China) Shi YQ	21	18	21

Quarter-finals
(Chinese Taipei) Wang T-w	19	10
3	(China) Shi YQ	21	21

==== Section 4 ====
First round
(China) Wang ZX	11	18
(India) L Sen	21	21
(Indonesia) A S Ginting	13	19
7	(Japan) K Naraoka	21	21
(Denmark) R Gemke	18	17
(France) C Popov	21	21
(China) Lei LX	21	21
2	(Denmark) A Antonsen	19	15

Second round
(India) L Sen	19	11
7	(Japan) K Naraoka	21	21
(France) C Popov	21	21
(China) Lei LX	14	11

Quarter-finals
7	(Japan) K Naraoka	21	13	8
(France) C Popov	18	21	21

== Women's singles ==
=== Seeds ===
1. (South Korea) An Se-young (champion)
2. (China) Wang Zhiyi (final)
3. (Japan) Akane Yamaguchi (semi-finals)
4. (China) Han Yue (quarter-finals)
5. (China) Chen Yufei (quarter-finals)
6. (Japan) Tomoka Miyazaki (second round)
7. (Thailand) Pornpawee Chochuwong (quarter-finals)
8. (Indonesia) Gregoria Mariska Tunjung (first round)

=== Finals ===
Semi-finals
1	(South Korea) An Se-young	21	21
(Japan) Riko Gunji	12	10
3	(Japan) Akane Yamaguchi	15	18
2	(China) Wang Zhiyi	21	21

Final
1	(South Korea) An Se-young	21	21
2	(China) Wang Zhiyi	12	10

=== Top half ===
==== Section 1 ====
First round
1	(South Korea) An S-y	21	21
(Thailand) R Intanon	14	11
(Japan) K Sugiyama	14	21	12
(South Korea) Kim G-e	21	17	21
5	(China) Chen YF	21	21
PFR	(Ukraine) P Buhrova	11	11
(Japan) M Suizu	21	18
(Canada) M Li	23	21

Second round
1	(South Korea) An S-y	22	21
(South Korea) Kim G-e	20	12
5	(China) Chen YF	17	21	21
(Canada) M Li	21	9	18

Quarter-finals
1	(South Korea) An S-y	21	21
5	(China) Chen YF	16	9

==== Section 2 ====
First round
4	(China) Han Y	21	21
(United States) BW Zhang	16	14
(Denmark) L Kjaersfeldt	10	13
(China) Gao FJ	21	21
8	(Indonesia) G M Tunjung	10	12
(Japan) R Gunji	21	21
(Thailand) B Ongbamrungphan	14	21	9
(Chinese Taipei) Chiu P-c	21	13	21

Second round
4	(China) Han Y	21	21
(China) Gao FJ	9	15
(Japan) R Gunji	21	21
(Chinese Taipei) Chiu P-c	9	16

Quarter-finals
4	(China) Han Y	17	10
(Japan) R Gunji	21	21

=== Bottom half ===
==== Section 3 ====
First round
(Chinese Taipei) Lin H-t	21	21
(Chinese Taipei) Sung S-y	15	15
(India) U Hooda	8	12
7	(Thailand) P Chochuwong	21	21
(South Korea) Sim Y-j	21	21
(India) P. V. Sindhu	15	14
(Denmark) M Blichfeldt	9	12
3	(Japan) A Yamaguchi	21	21

Second round
(Chinese Taipei) Lin H-t	9	14
7	(Thailand) P Chochuwong	21	21
(South Korea) Sim Y-j	13	15
3	(Japan) A Yamaguchi	21	21

Quarter-finals
7	(Thailand) P Chochuwong	15	22
3	(Japan) A Yamaguchi	21	24

==== Section 4 ====
First round
(Japan) N Nidaira	10	16
(Indonesia) P K Wardani	21	21
(Scotland) K Gilmour	15	18
6	(Japan) T Miyazaki	21	21
(India) A Upadhyaya	21	18	21
(India) R Ramraj	15	21	18
(Chinese Taipei) Hsu W-c	13	9
2	(China) Wang ZY	21	21

Second round
(Indonesia) P K Wardani	21	21
6	(Japan) T Miyazaki	17	14
(India) A Upadhyaya	21	11	12
2	(China) Wang ZY	13	21	21

Quarter-finals
(Indonesia) P K Wardani	22	17	16
2	(China) Wang ZY	20	21	21

== Men's doubles ==
=== Seeds ===
1. (Malaysia) Goh Sze Fei / Nur Izzuddin (final)
2. (Malaysia) Aaron Chia / Soh Wooi Yik (first round)
3. (South Korea) Kim Won-ho / Seo Seung-jae (champions)
4. (Denmark) Kim Astrup / Anders Skaarup Rasmussen (second round)
5. (China) Liang Weikeng / Wang Chang (quarter-finals)
6. (Malaysia) Man Wei Chong / Tee Kai Wun (quarter-finals)
7. (Indonesia) Sabar Karyaman Gutama / Muhammad Reza Pahlevi Isfahani (first round)
8. (Indonesia) Leo Rolly Carnando / Bagas Maulana (first round)

=== Finals ===
Semi-finals
1	(Malaysia) Goh Sze Fei (Malaysia) Nur Izzuddin	21	21
(Chinese Taipei) Liu Kuang-heng (Chinese Taipei) Yang Po-han	19	11
3	(South Korea) Kim Won-ho (South Korea) Seo Seung-jae	21	21
(Malaysia) Ong Yew Sin (Malaysia) Teo Ee Yi	14	15

Final
1	(Malaysia) Goh Sze Fei (Malaysia) Nur Izzuddin	16	17
3	(South Korea) Kim Won-ho (South Korea) Seo Seung-jae	21	21

=== Top half ===
==== Section 1 ====
First round
1	(Malaysia) Goh S F (Malaysia) N Izzuddin	21	21
(Canada) K Lee (Canada) T A Lindeman	13	15
(Japan) H Midorikawa (Japan) K Yamashita	17	21	21
(Chinese Taipei) Chiu H-c (Chinese Taipei) Wang C-l	21	16	19
7	(Indonesia) S K Gutama (Indonesia) M R P Isfahani	22	12
(Indonesia) F Alfian (Indonesia) M S Fikri	24	21
(Denmark) R Kjær (Denmark) F Søgaard	21	21
(Chinese Taipei) Lee J-h (Chinese Taipei) Yang P-hs	15	16

Second round
1	(Malaysia) Goh S F (Malaysia) N Izzuddin	21	21
(Japan) H Midorikawa (Japan) K Yamashita	19	18
(Indonesia) F Alfian (Indonesia) M S Fikri	21	19	21
(Denmark) R Kjær (Denmark) F Søgaard	14	21	11

Quarter-finals
1	(Malaysia) Goh S F (Malaysia) N Izzuddin	21	17	22
(Indonesia) F Alfian (Indonesia) M S Fikri	13	21	20

==== Section 2 ====
First round
4	(Denmark) K Astrup (Denmark) A S Rasmussen	21	21
(Denmark) D Lundgaard (Denmark) M Vestergaard	19	16
(France) C Popov (France) T J Popov	21	17	19
(Malaysia) N M Azriyn (Malaysia) Tan W K	13	21	21
8	(Indonesia) L R Carnando (Indonesia) B Maulana	15	19
(Chinese Taipei) Liu K-h (Chinese Taipei) Yang P-ha	21	21
(China) Xie HN (China) Zeng WH	23	12	19
(China) Chen BY (China) Liu Yi	21	21	21

Second round
4	(Denmark) K Astrup (Denmark) A S Rasmussen	16	21	19
(Malaysia) N M Azriyn (Malaysia) Tan W K	21	15	21
(Chinese Taipei) Liu K-h (Chinese Taipei) Yang P-ha	21	21
(China) Chen BY (China) Liu Yi	19	18

Quarter-finals
(Malaysia) N M Azriyn (Malaysia) Tan W K	21	23	17
(Chinese Taipei) Liu K-h (Chinese Taipei) Yang P-ha	18	25	21

=== Bottom half ===
==== Section 3 ====
First round
(Thailand) K Kedren (Thailand) D Puavaranukroh	19	16
(China) Huang D (China) Liu Ya	21	21
(Malaysia) J Arif (Malaysia) Yap R K	28	12
6	(Malaysia) Man W C (Malaysia) Tee K W	30	21
(Japan) T Hoki (Japan) Y Kobayashi	21	21
(Chinese Taipei) Lee F-c (Chinese Taipei) Lee F-j	14	12
(India) H Amsakarunan (India) R Kumar	15	9
3	(South Korea) Kim W-h (South Korea) Seo S-j	21	21

Second round
(China) Huang D (China) Liu Ya	19	21	20
6	(Malaysia) Man W C (Malaysia) Tee K W	21	14	22
(Japan) T Hoki (Japan) Y Kobayashi	20	17
3	(South Korea) Kim W-h (South Korea) Seo S-j	22	21

Quarter-finals
6	(Malaysia) Man W C (Malaysia) Tee K W	13	21	13
3	(South Korea) Kim W-h (South Korea) Seo S-j	21	18	21

==== Section 4 ====
First round
(India) S Rankireddy (India) C Shetty	21	21
(South Korea) Kang M-h (South Korea) Ki D-j	18	10
(Japan) T Nomura (Japan) Y Shimogami	21	15	11
5	(China) Liang WK (China) Wang C	10	21	21
(Japan) K Mitsuhashi (Japan) H Okamura	21	20	19
(United States) Chen Z-y (United States) P Smith	15	22	21
(Malaysia) Ong Y S (Malaysia) Teo E Y	21	21
2	(Malaysia) A Chia (Malaysia) Soh W Y	15	15

Second round
(India) S Rankireddy (India) C Shetty	22	14
5	(China) Liang WK (China) Wang C	24	21
(United States) Chen Z-y (United States) P Smith	21	14	19
(Malaysia) Ong Y S (Malaysia) Teo E Y	19	21	21

Quarter-finals
5	(China) Liang WK (China) Wang C	23	19
(Malaysia) Ong Y S (Malaysia) Teo E Y	25	21

== Women's doubles ==
=== Seeds ===
1. (China) Liu Shengshu / Tan Ning (champions)
2. (Japan) Nami Matsuyama / Chiharu Shida (semi-finals)
3. (Malaysia) Pearly Tan / Thinaah Muralitharan (final)
4. (South Korea) Baek Ha-na / Lee So-hee (quarter-finals)
5. (China) Li Yijing / Luo Xumin (first round)
6. (Japan) Rin Iwanaga / Kie Nakanishi (second round)
7. (South Korea) Kim Hye-jeong / Kong Hee-yong (quarter-finals)
8. (Japan) Yuki Fukushima / Mayu Matsumoto (first round)

=== Finals ===
Semi-finals
1	(China) Liu Shengshu (China) Tan Ning	21	21
(China) Jia Yifan (China) Zhang Shuxian	7	16
3	(Malaysia) Pearly Tan (Malaysia) Thinaah Muralitharan	21	21
2	(Japan) Nami Matsuyama (Japan) Chiharu Shida	13	11

Final
1	(China) Liu Shengshu (China) Tan Ning	21	21
3	(Malaysia) Pearly Tan (Malaysia) Thinaah Muralitharan	15	14

=== Top half ===
==== Section 1 ====
First round
1	(China) Liu SS (China) Tan N	21	21
(Ukraine) P Buhrova (Ukraine) Y Kantemyr	15	12
(Japan) K Ishikawa (Japan) M Kawazoe	21	21
(India) R Panda (India) S Panda	13	7
5	(China) Li YJ (China) Luo XM	21	17	12
(Japan) M Otake (Japan) M Takahashi	15	21	21
(Australia) G Somerville (Australia) A Yu	7	13
(Indonesia) L T Mayasari (Indonesia) S F S Ramadhanti	21	21

Second round
1	(China) Liu SS (China) Tan N	21	21
(Japan) K Ishikawa (Japan) M Kawazoe	14	17
(Japan) M Otake (Japan) M Takahashi	17	14
(Indonesia) L T Mayasari (Indonesia) S F S Ramadhanti	21	21

Quarter-finals
1	(China) Liu SS (China) Tan N	10	21	21
(Indonesia) L T Mayasari (Indonesia) S F S Ramadhanti	21	17	16

==== Section 2 ====
First round
4	(South Korea) Baek H-n (South Korea) Lee S-h	21	21
(Malaysia) Go P K (Malaysia) Teoh M X	9	19
(Thailand) O Jongsathapornparn (Thailand) S Suwachai	14	13
(Japan) K Osawa (Japan) M Tanabe	21	21
6	(Japan) R Iwanaga (Japan) K Nakanishi	17	21	21
(Malaysia) Ong X Y (Malaysia) C Ting	21	8	8
(Chinese Taipei) Sung S-y (Chinese Taipei) Yu C-h	14	12
(China) Jia YF (China) Zhang SX	21	21

Second round
4	(South Korea) Baek H-n (South Korea) Lee S-h	21	21
(Japan) K Osawa (Japan) M Tanabe	16	16
6	(Japan) R Iwanaga (Japan) K Nakanishi	13	21	19
(China) Jia YF (China) Zhang SX	21	18	21

Quarter-finals
4	(South Korea) Baek H-n (South Korea) Lee S-h	18	21	15
(China) Jia YF (China) Zhang SX	21	17	21

=== Bottom half ===
==== Section 3 ====
First round
(Chinese Taipei) Chang C-h (Chinese Taipei) Yang C-t	21	21
(Japan) N Hara (Japan) R Kiyose	19	12
(South Korea) Jeong N-e (South Korea) Lee Y-w	21	21
8	(Japan) Y Fukushima (Japan) M Matsumoto	17	19
(Chinese Taipei) Hsieh P-s (Chinese Taipei) Hung E-t	21	21
(United States) F Corbett (United States) J Gai	18	14
(Bulgaria) G Stoeva (Bulgaria) S Stoeva	16	14
3	(Malaysia) P Tan (Malaysia) T Muralitharan	21	21

Second round
(Chinese Taipei) Chang C-h (Chinese Taipei) Yang C-t	10	13
(South Korea) Jeong N-e (South Korea) Lee Y-w	21	21
(Chinese Taipei) Hsieh P-s (Chinese Taipei) Hung E-t	14	16
3	(Malaysia) P Tan (Malaysia) T Muralitharan	21	21

Quarter-finals
(South Korea) Jeong N-e (South Korea) Lee Y-w	15	19
3	(Malaysia) P Tan (Malaysia) T Muralitharan	21	21

==== Section 4 ====
First round
(Indonesia) F D Kusuma (Indonesia) A C Pratiwi	11	21	21
(United States) L Lam (United States) A Lee	21	14	14
PFR	(Japan) R Hiramoto (Japan) H Konishi	16	14
7	(South Korea) Kim H-j (South Korea) Kong H-y	21	21
(Hong Kong) Lui L L (Hong Kong) Tsang H Y	21	21
(India) K Selvam (India) S Singhi	6	15
(Japan) R Hirokami (Japan) S Hobara	13	11
2	(Japan) N Matsuyama (Japan) C Shida	21	21

Second round
(Indonesia) F D Kusuma (Indonesia) A C Pratiwi	22	19	11
7	(South Korea) Kim H-j (South Korea) Kong H-y	20	21	21
(Hong Kong) Lui L L (Hong Kong) Tsang H Y	13	12
2	(Japan) N Matsuyama (Japan) C Shida	21	21

Quarter-finals
7	(South Korea) Kim H-j (South Korea) Kong H-y	21	19	18
2	(Japan) N Matsuyama (Japan) C Shida	19	21	21

== Mixed doubles ==
=== Seeds ===
1. (China) Feng Yanzhe / Huang Dongping (semi-finals)
2. (China) Jiang Zhenbang / Wei Yaxin (champions)
3. (Hong Kong) Tang Chun Man / Tse Ying Suet (quarter-finals)
4. (Malaysia) Chen Tang Jie / Toh Ee Wei (semi-finals)
5. (Thailand) Dechapol Puavaranukroh / Supissara Paewsampran (final)
6. (Malaysia) Goh Soon Huat / Shevon Jemie Lai (quarter-finals)
7. (France) Thom Gicquel / Delphine Delrue (second round)
8. (Japan) Hiroki Midorikawa / Natsu Saito (quarter-finals)

=== Finals ===
Semi-finals
1	(China) Feng Yanzhe (China) Huang Dongping	13	17
5	(Thailand) Dechapol Puavaranukroh (Thailand) Supissara Paewsampran	21	21
4	(Malaysia) Chen Tang Jie (Malaysia) Toh Ee Wei	12	16
2	(China) Jiang Zhenbang (China) Wei Yaxin	21	21

Final
5	(Thailand) Dechapol Puavaranukroh (Thailand) Supissara Paewsampran	19	21	15
2	(China) Jiang Zhenbang (China) Wei Yaxin	21	16	21

=== Top half ===
==== Section 1 ====
First round
1	(China) Feng YZ (China) Huang DP	21	21
(Chinese Taipei) Lu M-c (Chinese Taipei) Hung E-t	15	17
(France) J Maio (France) L Palermo	21	15	16
(South Korea) Wang C (South Korea) Jeong N-e	19	21	21
8	(Japan) H Midorikawa (Japan) N Saito	21	21	21
(Japan) Y Watanabe (Japan) H Osawa	19	23	14
(China) Cheng X (China) Zhang C	10	19
(Indonesia) A Syahnawi (Indonesia) N V Marwah	21	21

Second round
1	(China) Feng YZ (China) Huang DP	21	21
(South Korea) Wang C (South Korea) Jeong N-e	14	12
8	(Japan) H Midorikawa (Japan) N Saito	23	18	21
(Indonesia) A Syahnawi (Indonesia) N V Marwah	21	21	14

Quarter-finals
1	(China) Feng YZ (China) Huang DP	21	21
8	(Japan) H Midorikawa (Japan) N Saito	10	9

==== Section 2 ====
First round
3	(Hong Kong) Tang C M (Hong Kong) Tse Y S	23	21	24
(China) Zhu YJ (China) Bao LJ	25	17	22
(Chinese Taipei) Yang P-hs (Chinese Taipei) Hu L-f	20	15
(Indonesia) R N Kusharjanto (Indonesia) G E Widjaja	22	21
5	(Thailand) D Puavaranukroh (Thailand) S Paewsampran	19	22	21
(Thailand) S Jomkoh (Thailand) O Jongsathapornparn	21	20	14
(Denmark) J Toft (Denmark) A Magelund	17	21	7
(Chinese Taipei) Ye H-w (Chinese Taipei) N G Chan	21	19	21

Second round
3	(Hong Kong) Tang C M (Hong Kong) Tse Y S	21	21
(Indonesia) R N Kusharjanto (Indonesia) G E Widjaja	17	19
5	(Thailand) D Puavaranukroh (Thailand) S Paewsampran	21	22
(Chinese Taipei) Ye H-w (Chinese Taipei) N G Chan	12	20

Quarter-finals
3	(Hong Kong) Tang C M (Hong Kong) Tse Y S	22	14	14
5	(Thailand) D Puavaranukroh (Thailand) S Paewsampran	20	21	21

=== Bottom half ===
==== Section 3 ====
First round
(Malaysia) Wong T C (Malaysia) Lim C S	9	8
(Japan) Y Shimogami (Japan) S Hobara	21	21
(United States) Chen Z-y (United States) F Corbett	18	13
7	(France) T Gicquel (France) D Delrue	21	21
(Indonesia) J Hidayatullah (Indonesia) F Pasaribu	21	21
(China) Guo XW (China) Chen FH	12	17
(Canada) K Lee (Canada) J Wu	15	19
4	(Malaysia) Chen T J (Malaysia) Toh E W	21	21

Second round
(Japan) Y Shimogami (Japan) S Hobara	21	21
7	(France) T Gicquel (France) D Delrue	11	19
(Indonesia) J Hidayatullah (Indonesia) F Pasaribu	21	16	12
4	(Malaysia) Chen T J (Malaysia) Toh E W	17	21	21

Quarter-finals
(Japan) Y Shimogami (Japan) S Hobara	14	12
4	(Malaysia) Chen T J (Malaysia) Toh E W	21	21

==== Section 4 ====
First round
(Singapore) T Hee (Singapore) Jin YJ	13	21	21
(Denmark) M Vestergaard (Denmark) C Busch	21	11	17
(Thailand) R Oupthong (Thailand) J Sudjaipraparat	15	10
6	(Malaysia) Goh S H (Malaysia) Lai S J	21	21
(Malaysia) Hoo P R (Malaysia) Cheng S Y	21	12	21
(United States) P Smith (United States) J Gai	19	21	16
(China) Gao JX (China) Wu MY	18	18
2	(China) Jiang ZB (China) Wei YX	21	21

Second round
(Singapore) T Hee (Singapore) Jin YJ	14	17
6	(Malaysia) Goh S H (Malaysia) Lai S J	21	21
(Malaysia) Hoo P R (Malaysia) Cheng S Y	9	6
2	(China) Jiang ZB (China) Wei YX	21	21

Quarter-finals
6	(Malaysia) Goh S H (Malaysia) Lai S J	13	21
2	(China) Jiang ZB (China) Wei YX	21	23

Preceded by 2025 Canada Open	BWF World Tour; 2025 BWF season	Succeeded by 2025 China Open
