= Supissara Paewsampran =

Thai badminton player (born 1999)

Supissara Paewsampran ศุภิสรา เพียวสามพราน
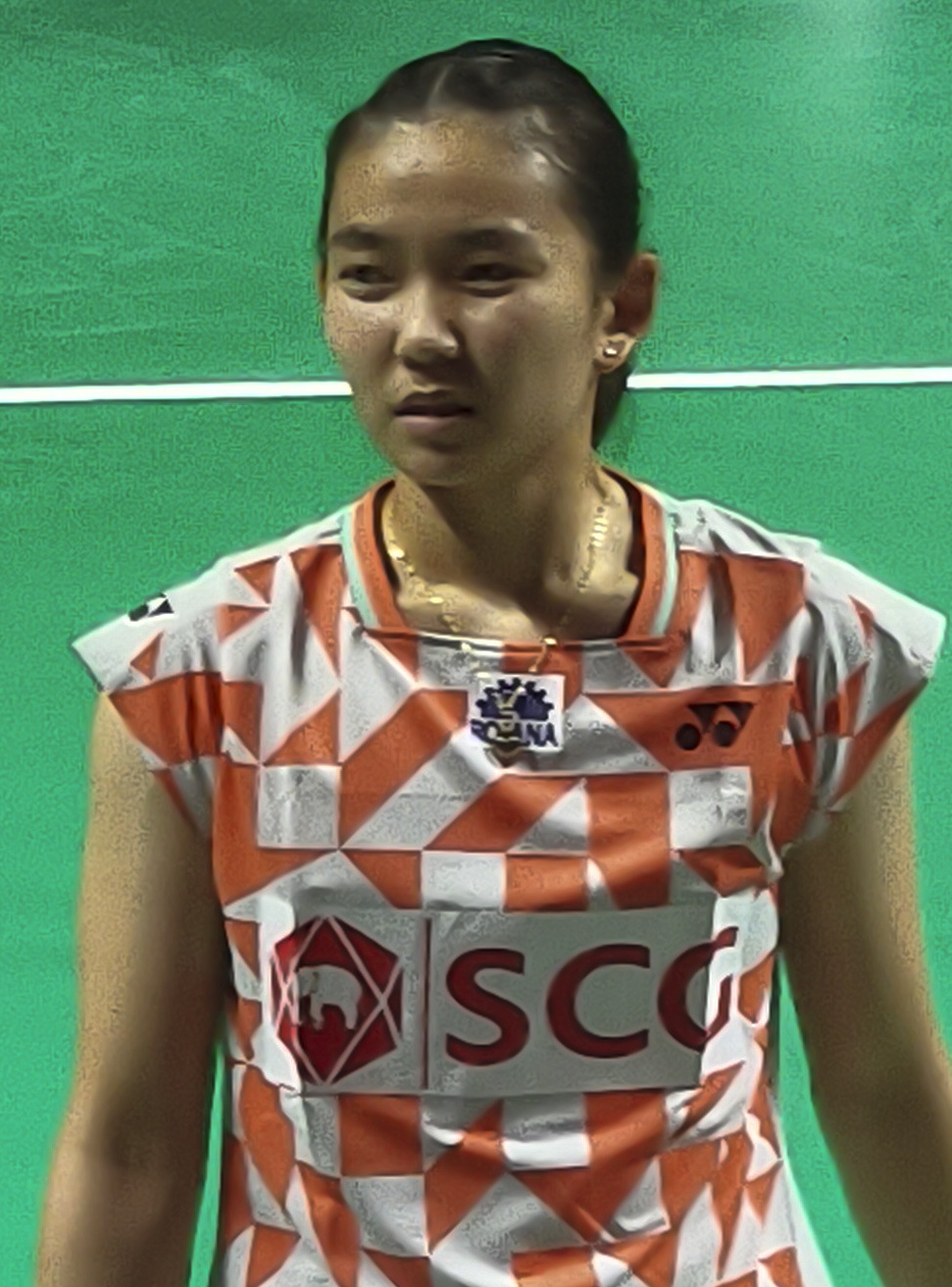
- Paewsampran at the 2026 Indonesia Open

Personal information
- Nickname: Fame
- Born: 18 November 1999 (age 27) Nakhon Pathom, Thailand
- Height: 1.63 m (5 ft 4 in)

Sport
- Country: Thailand
- Sport: Badminton

Women's & mixed doubles
- Highest ranking: 17 (WD with Puttita Supajirakul, 23 May 2023); 3 (XD with Dechapol Puavaranukroh, 22 July 2025)
- Current ranking: 6 (XD with Dechapol Puavaranukroh, 17 November 2026)
- BWF profile
Medal record
Women's badminton
Representing Thailand
Uber Cup
Bronze medal – third place	2020 Aarhus	Women's team
Asian Games
Bronze medal – third place	2022 Hangzhou	Women's team
Asian Championships
Silver medal – second place	2026 Ningbo	Mixed doubles
SEA Games
Gold medal – first place	2025 Thailand	Women's team
Silver medal – second place	2025 Thailand	Mixed doubles

Supissara Paewsampran (Thai: ศุภิสรา เพียวสามพราน; born 18 November 1999) is a Thai badminton player affiliated with SCG academy. Paewsampran was part of Thailand's bronze medals-winning team at the 2020 Uber Cup.

== Career ==
=== Early career ===
Supissara was born on 18 November 1999, in Nakhon Pathom province. Growing up, badminton was heavily woven into her family's lifestyle. She first picked up a badminton racket around the age of 6, followed her older brother to the courts and played for fun. At the age of 15, she made decision to commit fully to the sport. Her raw talent, defensive instincts, and spatial awareness on court caught the eyes of talent scouts, leading to her recruitment into the SCG Badminton Academy.

=== 2024 ===
In October 2024, Supissara formed a new mixed doubles pairing with Dechapol Puavaranukroh, The newly established mixed doubles pair made an immediate impact on the BWF World Tour, seamlessly capturing consecutive titles at the Japan Masters and the Syed Modi International.

=== 2025: Six World Tour titles and Eddy Choong Rising Star of the Year ===
Supissara started the 2025 season at the Super 1000 event, Malaysia Open, where she and Dechapol captured the mixed doubles title by defeating China's world number one pair, Feng Yanzhe and Huang Dongping, in a thrilling three-game final. The duo then won the Thailand Masters title with a straight-game victory over Dejan Ferdinansyah and Siti Fadia Silva Ramadhanti. Supissara and Dechapol later claimed the Singapore Open title, before recording a runner-up finish at the Indonesia Open and another runner-up finish to the defending champion Jiang Zhenbang and Wei Yaxin at the Japan Open.

Supissara and Dechapol maintained their prominent tier-one status later in the season, capturing the China Masters title and became the first ever non-Chinese pair to win the mixed doubles at the China Masters since its inception in 2005. The duo later finished as runner-up at the French Open and a victory at the Japan Masters. Representing Thailand on home soil at the SEA Games, she contributed to a gold medal in the women's team event and a silver medal in the mixed doubles. This exceptional consistency across the year saw Supissara and Dechapol reach a total of eight finals in the BWF World Tour, capturing five titles. The duo then qualified as number 1 for the season-ending BWF World Tour Finals and was honoured with "Eddy Choong Rising Star of the Year" award by the Badminton World Federation; however, despite their strong regular season form, the duo's campaign ended prematurely when they were eliminated in the group stage of the tournament.

== Achievements ==
=== Asian Championships ===
Mixed doubles
Year	Venue	Partner	Opponent	Score	Result
2026	Ningbo Olympic Sports Center Gymnasium, Ningbo, China	(Thailand) Dechapol Puavaranukroh	(South Korea) Kim Jae-hyeon (South Korea) Jang Ha-jeong	Walkover	Silver

=== SEA Games ===
Mixed doubles
Year	Venue	Partner	Opponent	Score	Result	Ref.
2025	Gymnasium 4, Thammasat University Rangsit Campus; Pathum Thani, Thailand	(Thailand) Dechapol Puavaranukroh	(Thailand) Ruttanapak Oupthong (Thailand) Jhenicha Sudjaipraparat	20–22, 19–21	Silver	

=== BWF World Tour (8 titles, 3 runners-up) ===
The BWF World Tour, which was announced on 19 March 2017 and implemented in 2018, is a series of elite badminton tournaments sanctioned by the Badminton World Federation (BWF). The BWF World Tour is divided into levels of World Tour Finals, Super 1000, Super 750, Super 500, Super 300, and the BWF Tour Super 100.

Mixed doubles
Year	Tournament	Level	Partner	Opponent	Score	Result
2024	Japan Masters	Super 500	(Thailand) Dechapol Puavaranukroh	(France) Thom Gicquel (France) Delphine Delrue	21–16, 10–21, 21–17	(gold) Winner
2024	Syed Modi International	Super 300	(Thailand) Dechapol Puavaranukroh	(India) Dhruv Kapila (India) Tanisha Crasto	18–21, 21–14, 21–8	(gold) Winner
2025	Malaysia Open	Super 1000	(Thailand) Dechapol Puavaranukroh	(China) Feng Yanzhe (China) Huang Dongping	21–13, 19–21, 21–18	(gold) Winner
2025	Thailand Masters	Super 300	(Thailand) Dechapol Puavaranukroh	(Indonesia) Dejan Ferdinansyah (Indonesia) Siti Fadia Silva Ramadhanti	19–21, 21–17, 21–13	(gold) Winner
2025	Singapore Open	Super 750	(Thailand) Dechapol Puavaranukroh	(Hong Kong) Tang Chun Man (Hong Kong) Tse Ying Suet	21–16, 21–9	(gold) Winner
2025	Indonesia Open	Super 1000	(Thailand) Dechapol Puavaranukroh	(France) Thom Gicquel (France) Delphine Delrue	16–21, 18–21	(silver) Runner-up
2025	Japan Open	Super 750	(Thailand) Dechapol Puavaranukroh	(China) Jiang Zhenbang (China) Wei Yaxin	19–21, 21–16, 15–21	(silver) Runner-up
2025	China Masters	Super 750	(Thailand) Dechapol Puavaranukroh	(Malaysia) Chen Tang Jie (Malaysia) Toh Ee Wei	21–8, 21–17	(gold) Winner
2025	French Open	Super 750	(Thailand) Dechapol Puavaranukroh	(China) Feng Yanzhe (China) Huang Dongping	25–27, 12–21	(silver) Runner-up
2025	Japan Masters	Super 500	(Thailand) Dechapol Puavaranukroh	(France) Thom Gicquel (France) Delphine Delrue	21–18, 14–21, 21–18	(gold) Winner
2026	India Open	Super 750	(Thailand) Dechapol Puavaranukroh	(Denmark) Mathias Christiansen (Denmark) Alexandra Bøje	19–21, 25–23, 21–18	(gold) Winner

=== BWF International Challenge/Series (4 titles, 1 runner-up) ===
Women's doubles
Year	Tournament	Partner	Opponent	Score	Result
2018	KaBaL International	(Thailand) Puttita Supajirakul	(Denmark) Elisa Melgaard (Denmark) Sofie Nielsen	21–14, 21–11	(gold) Winner

Mixed doubles
Year	Tournament	Partner	Opponent	Score	Result
2018	Slovak Open	(Thailand) Pakin Kuna-anuvit	(Chinese Taipei) Ye Hong-wei (Chinese Taipei) Teng Chun-hsun	16–21, 16–21	(silver) Runner-up
2018	Nepal International	(Thailand) Supak Jomkoh	(Thailand) Panachai Worasaktayanan (Thailand) Pitchayanin Ungka	19–21, 21–15, 21–14	(gold) Winner
2019	Slovak Open	(Thailand) Supak Jomkoh	(Spain) Alberto Zapico (Spain) Lorena Uslé	21–18, 21–14	(gold) Winner
2019	Nepal International	(Thailand) Supak Jomkoh	(South Korea) Kim Sa-rang (South Korea) Kim Ha-na	21–18, 21–16	(gold) Winner

BWF International Challenge tournament
BWF International Series tournament
BWF Future Series tournament
