= 2026 Canada Open =

Tournament details
- Dates: 30 June – 5 July
- Edition: 61st
- Level: Super 300
- Total prize money: US$250,000
- Venue: Markham Pan Am Centre
- Location: Markham, Ontario, Canada

Champions
- Men's singles: (Japan) Yudai Okimoto
- Women's singles: (Japan) Riko Gunji
- Men's doubles: (Japan) Hiroki Okamura (Japan) Kyohei Yamashita
- Women's doubles: (Japan) Hinata Suzuki (Japan) Nao Yamakita
- Mixed doubles: (Japan) Akira Koga (Japan) Natsu Saito

The 2026 Canada Open (officially known as the Yonex Canada Open 2026 for sponsorship reasons) was a badminton tournament which took place at Markham Pan Am Centre in Markham, Ontario, Canada, from 30 June to 5 July 2026 and has a total purse of $250,000.

== Tournament ==
The 2026 Canada Open was the eighteenth tournament of the 2026 BWF World Tour and also part of the Canada Open championships, which has been held since 1957. This tournament is organized by the Badminton Canada and sanctioned by the BWF.

=== Venue ===
This international tournament was held at the Markham Pan Am Centre in Markham, Ontario, Canada.

=== Point distribution ===
Below is the point distribution table for each phase of the tournament based on the BWF points system for the BWF World Tour Super 300 event.

Winner	Runner-up	3/4	5/8	9/16	17/32	33/64	65/128
7,000	5,950	4,900	3,850	2,750	1,670	660	320

=== Prize pool ===
The total prize money is US$250,000 with the distribution of the prize money in accordance with BWF regulations.

Event	Winner	Finalist	Semi-finals	Quarter-finals	Last 16
Singles	$18,750	$9,500	$3,625	$1,500	$875
Doubles	$19,750	$9,500	$3,500	$1,812.50	$937.50

== Men's singles ==
=== Seeds ===
1. (Canada) Victor Lai (semi-finals)
2. (Canada) Brian Yang (first round)
3. (Japan) Yudai Okimoto (champion)
4. (India) Srikanth Kidambi (first round)
5. (Denmark) Magnus Johannesen (withdrew)
6. (Chinese Taipei) Wang Po-wei (quarter-finals)
7. (Chinese Taipei) Su Li-yang (first round)
8. (Japan) Minoru Koga (second round)

=== Finals ===
Semi-finals
1	(Canada) Victor Lai	21	16	11
3	(Japan) Yudai Okimoto	15	21	21
(Malaysia) Lee Zii Jia	13	21	18
(Japan) Riki Takei	21	18	21

Final
3	(Japan) Yudai Okimoto	21	21
(Japan) Riki Takei	13	3

=== Top half ===
==== Section 1 ====
First round
1	(Canada) V Lai	21	21
(Finland) J Oldorff	9	12
(Israel) M Zilberman	11	21	13
(Finland) K Koljonen	21	16	21
PFQ	(France) E Roy	12	13
(Chinese Taipei) Wang Y-k	21	21
(Vietnam) Nguyễn H D	15	7
(England) H Huang	21	21

Second round
1	(Canada) V Lai	21	21
(Finland) K Koljonen	15	12
(Chinese Taipei) Wang Y-k	21	19	21
(England) H Huang	17	21	16

Quarter-finals
1	(Canada) V Lai	21	21
(Chinese Taipei) Wang Y-k	14	17

==== Section 2 ====
First round
3	(Japan) Y Okimoto	21	21
(India) S Dayanand	7	11
(South Korea) Yoo T-b	19	21	21
(India) S Subramanian	21	15	15
7	(Chinese Taipei) Su L-y	14	19
(Croatia) A Dinata	21	21
Q2	(Japan) R Hatano	15	21	21
PFQ	(United States) M S Alcala	21	7	9

Second round
3	(Japan) Y Okimoto	21	21
(South Korea) Yoo T-b	18	14
(Croatia) A Dinata	15	10
Q2	(Japan) R Hatano	21	21

Quarter-finals
3	(Japan) Y Okimoto	21	21
Q2	(Japan) R Hatano	9	11

=== Bottom half ===
==== Section 3 ====
First round
(Denmark) D J Holm	21	21
Q3	(Chinese Taipei) Kuo K-l	12	15
Q4	(Chinese Taipei) Ting Y-c	13	6
6	(Chinese Taipei) Wang P-w	21	21
(Canada) J Nguyen	19	14
(Chinese Taipei) Liao J-f	21	21
(Malaysia) Lee Z J	11
4	(India) S Kidambi	10^{r}

Second round
(Denmark) D J Holm	5	13
6	(Chinese Taipei) Wang P-w	21	21
(Chinese Taipei) Liao J-f	11	13
(Malaysia) Lee Z J	21	21

Quarter-finals
6	(Chinese Taipei) Wang P-w	15	13
(Malaysia) Lee Z J	21	21

==== Section 4 ====
First round
(Chinese Taipei) Huang P-h	12	10
(Japan) R Takei	21	21
Q1	(Malaysia) Cheam J W	21	18	19
8	(Japan) M Koga	16	21	21
(Brazil) J Matias	27	18	15
(Belgium) J Carraggi	25	21	21
(Japan) S Ogawa	13	24	21
2	(Canada) B Yang	21	22	17

Second round
(Japan) R Takei	21	21
8	(Japan) M Koga	19	19
(Belgium) J Carraggi	21	14	21
(Japan) S Ogawa	15	21	12

Quarter-finals
(Japan) R Takei	21	21
(Belgium) J Carraggi	18	15

== Women's singles ==
=== Seeds ===
1. (Canada) Michelle Li (semi-finals)
2. (Denmark) Line Christophersen (final)
3. (Japan) Riko Gunji (champion)
4. (United States) Beiwen Zhang (semi-finals)
5. (India) Devika Sihag (first round)
6. (Denmark) Amalie Schulz (quarter-finals)
7. (Chinese Taipei) Sung Shuo-yun (first round)
8. (Ukraine) Polina Buhrova (second round)

=== Finals ===
Semi-finals
1	(Canada) Michelle Li	13	17
3	(Japan) Riko Gunji	21	21
4	(United States) Beiwen Zhang	15	3^{r}
2	(Denmark) Line Christophersen	21	8

Final
3	(Japan) Riko Gunji	21	15	21
2	(Denmark) Line Christophersen	15	21	6

=== Top half ===
==== Section 1 ====
First round
1	(Canada) M Li	21	24	21
(India) A Kharb	6	26	13
Q4	(Canada) C Hoang	20	12
(Brazil) J V Vieira	22	21
8	(Ukraine) P Buhrova	21	11	21
(Germany) Y Li	17	21	17
(India) S Valishetty	9	18
(Chinese Taipei) Huang C-p	21	21

Second round
1	(Canada) M Li	22	21
(Brazil) J V Vieira	20	12
8	(Ukraine) P Buhrova	14	15
(Chinese Taipei) Huang C-p	21	21

Quarter-finals
1	(Canada) M Li	21	21
(Chinese Taipei) Huang C-p	18	16

==== Section 2 ====
First round
3	(Japan) R Gunji	21	21
(Canada) W Zhang	7	9
(India) T Hemanth	21	21
Q1	(United States) D Gupta	16	18
7	(Chinese Taipei) Sung S-y	11	18
(Bulgaria) K Nalbantova	21	21
(Czech Republic) T Švábíková	15	14
Q2	(Ukraine) Y Kantemyr	21	21

Second round
3	(Japan) R Gunji	21	21
(India) T Hemanth	11	11
(Bulgaria) K Nalbantova	10	21	15
Q2	(Ukraine) Y Kantemyr	21	9	21

Quarter-finals
3	(Japan) R Gunji	21	21
Q2	(Ukraine) Y Kantemyr	14	9

=== Bottom half ===
==== Section 3 ====
First round
Q3	(Chinese Taipei) Wang P-y	15	17
(United States) E Lin	21	21
(Thailand) Tonr Saeheng	21	13	9
6	(Denmark) A Schulz	12	21	21
(India) A Kashyap	21	21
PFQ	(France) A Tatranova	14	12
(South Korea) Kim M-j	13	16
4	(United States) B Zhang	21	21

Second round
(United States) E Lin	18	21	14
6	(Denmark) A Schulz	21	14	21
(India) A Kashyap	22	17	17
4	(United States) B Zhang	20	21	21

Quarter-finals
6	(Denmark) A Schulz	17	15
4	(United States) B Zhang	21	21

==== Section 4 ====
First round
(Canada) R Chan	15	21	21
(India) R Ramraj	21	14	15
(Chinese Taipei) Tung C-t	21	21
5	(India) D Sihag	14	15
(United States) I Jaiswal	21	18	21
(Chinese Taipei) Peng Y-w	18	21	13
(Chinese Taipei) Chen S-y	13	16
2	(Denmark) L Christophersen	21	21

Second round
(Canada) R Chan	21	19	22
(Chinese Taipei) Tung C-t	11	21	24
(United States) I Jaiswal	21	19	17
2	(Denmark) L Christophersen	18	21	21

Quarter-finals
(Chinese Taipei) Tung C-t	13	20
2	(Denmark) L Christophersen	21	22

== Men's doubles ==
=== Seeds ===
1. (United States) Chen Zhi-yi / Presley Smith (second round)
2. (Chinese Taipei) He Zhi-wei / Huang Jui-hsuan (second round)
3. (Chinese Taipei) Chen Zhi-ray / Lin Yu-chieh (first round)
4. (Scotland) Christopher Grimley / Matthew Grimley (quarter-finals)
5. (Canada) Kevin Lee / Ty Alexander Lindeman (second round)
6. (Czech Republic) Jiří Král / Ondřej Král (second round)
7. (France) Éloi Adam / Léo Rossi (second round)
8. (Chinese Taipei) Lai Po-yu / Tsai Fu-cheng (second round)

=== Finals ===
Semi-finals
(Denmark) Christian Faust Kjær (Denmark) Rasmus Kjær	21	10	21
(France) Julien Maio (France) William Villeger	14	21	13
Q4	(Japan) Takuto Goto (Japan) Tsubasa Yoshida	16	21	19
(Japan) Hiroki Okamura (Japan) Kyohei Yamashita	21	19	21

Final
(Denmark) Christian Faust Kjær (Denmark) Rasmus Kjær	21	10	17
(Japan) Hiroki Okamura (Japan) Kyohei Yamashita	13	21	21

=== Top half ===
==== Section 1 ====
First round
1	(United States) Chen Z-y (United States) P Smith	21	22
(Scotland) A Dunn (Scotland) A Pringle	16	20
(United States) A Q Lee (United States) S Xing	10	17
(Denmark) C F Kjær (Denmark) R Kjær	21	21
7	(France) É Adam (France) L Rossi	21	10	21
(Japan) H Kawabe (Japan) K Matsukawa	12	21	16
(Japan) K Matsui (Japan) K Mitsuhashi	18	21	21
(England) O Butler (England) S Jones	21	13	17

Second round
1	(United States) Chen Z-y (United States) P Smith	14	21	19
(Denmark) C F Kjær (Denmark) R Kjær	21	17	21
7	(France) É Adam (France) L Rossi	23	16	21
(Japan) K Matsui (Japan) K Mitsuhashi	21	21	23

Quarter-finals
(Denmark) C F Kjær (Denmark) R Kjær	21	22
(Japan) K Matsui (Japan) K Mitsuhashi	12	20

==== Section 2 ====
First round
3	(Chinese Taipei) Chen Z-r (Chinese Taipei) Lin Y-c	15	21	19
(Chinese Taipei) Chou Y-h (Chinese Taipei) Wu H-y	21	9	21
(Japan) S Mezaki (Japan) Y Oku	21	25
(Chinese Taipei) Chiu S-h (Chinese Taipei) Lin B-w	16	23
5	(Canada) K Lee (Canada) T A Lindeman	21	21
(India) A Doddavarapu (India) A Pochana	9	7
(Canada) D Leung (Canada) N Yakura	14	10
(France) J Maio (France) W Villeger	21	21

Second round
(Chinese Taipei) Chou Y-h (Chinese Taipei) Wu H-y	15	23	16
(Japan) S Mezaki (Japan) Y Oku	21	21	21
5	(Canada) K Lee (Canada) T A Lindeman	15	17
(France) J Maio (France) W Villeger	21	21

Quarter-finals
(Japan) S Mezaki (Japan) Y Oku	13	21	17
(France) J Maio (France) W Villeger	21	15	21

=== Bottom half ===
==== Section 3 ====
First round
Q4	(Japan) T Goto (Japan) T Yoshida	21	21
Q2	(Indonesia) A T Tololiu (Indonesia) G C W Wijaya	14	10
(Brazil) F Farias (Brazil) D Silva	15	11
6	(Czech Republic) J Král (Czech Republic) O Král	21	21
(Chinese Taipei) Chang K-c (Chinese Taipei) Chen S-f	21	21
(Canada) C Chau (Canada) J Mak	16	14
(Chinese Taipei) Lin C-y (Chinese Taipei) Lin Y-s	20	10
4	(Scotland) C Grimley (Scotland) M Grimley	22	21

Second round
Q4	(Japan) T Goto (Japan) T Yoshida	21	21
6	(Czech Republic) J Král (Czech Republic) O Král	10	18
(Chinese Taipei) Chang K-c (Chinese Taipei) Chen S-f	21	18
4	(Scotland) C Grimley (Scotland) M Grimley	23	21

Quarter-finals
Q4	(Japan) T Goto (Japan) T Yoshida	12	21	21
4	(Scotland) C Grimley (Scotland) M Grimley	21	14	14

==== Section 4 ====
First round
Q1	(Chinese Taipei) Chen C-k (Chinese Taipei) Liu K-h	22	21
(England) A Green (England) Z Russ	20	10
Q3	(United States) A Liu (United States) T Zhang	9	11
8	(Chinese Taipei) Lai P-y (Chinese Taipei) Tsai F-c	21	21
(Japan) H Okamura (Japan) K Yamashita	21	21
(Germany) B Geiss (Germany) J R Jansen	11	11
(Canada) H Pong (Canada) K Pong	14	13
2	(Chinese Taipei) He Z-w (Chinese Taipei) Huang J-h	21	21

Second round
Q1	(Chinese Taipei) Chen C-k (Chinese Taipei) Liu K-h	21	9	21
8	(Chinese Taipei) Lai P-y (Chinese Taipei) Tsai F-c	8	21	14
(Japan) H Okamura (Japan) K Yamashita	21	21
2	(Chinese Taipei) He Z-w (Chinese Taipei) Huang J-h	16	8

Quarter-finals
Q1	(Chinese Taipei) Chen C-k (Chinese Taipei) Liu K-h	14	23	17
(Japan) H Okamura (Japan) K Yamashita	21	21	21

== Women's doubles ==
=== Seeds ===
1. (Chinese Taipei) Hsu Yin-hui / Lin Jhih-yun (quarter-finals)
2. (United States) Lauren Lam / Allison Lee (semi-finals)
3. (Japan) Kaho Osawa / Mai Tanabe (final)
4. (Japan) Hinata Suzuki / Nao Yamakita (champions)
5. (Japan) Ririna Hiramoto / Kokona Ishikawa (quarter-finals)
6. (United States) Francesca Corbett / Jennie Gai (semi-finals)
7. (Ukraine) Polina Buhrova / Yevheniia Kantemyr (quarter-finals)
8. (Chinese Taipei) Lin Chih-chun / Yang Chu-yun (quarter-finals)

=== Finals ===
Semi-finals
6	(United States) Francesca Corbett (United States) Jennie Gai	12	12
4	(Japan) Hinata Suzuki (Japan) Nao Yamakita	21	21
3	(Japan) Kaho Osawa (Japan) Mai Tanabe	21	21
2	(United States) Lauren Lam (United States) Allison Lee	12	16

Final
4	(Japan) Hinata Suzuki (Japan) Nao Yamakita	21	21
3	(Japan) Kaho Osawa (Japan) Mai Tanabe	15	16

=== Top half ===
==== Section 1 ====
First round
1	(Chinese Taipei) Hsu Y-h (Chinese Taipei) Lin J-y	21	20	24
(Japan) S Nakade (Japan) M Takahashi	16	22	22
(England) S Kelly (England) L Tolman	23	21
(Canada) Ch Choi (Canada) E Meng	21	10
6	(United States) F Corbett (United States) J Gai	21	21
Q3	(Germany) S Küspert (Germany) I Lohau	15	12
(Japan) Y Kato (Japan) S Yonemoto	21	21
PFQ	(United States) S Li (United States) K Ngo	13	11

Second round
1	(Chinese Taipei) Hsu Y-h (Chinese Taipei) Lin J-y	16	21	21
(England) S Kelly (England) L Tolman	21	7	11
6	(United States) F Corbett (United States) J Gai	21	21
(Japan) Y Kato (Japan) S Yonemoto	16	16

Quarter-finals
1	(Chinese Taipei) Hsu Y-h (Chinese Taipei) Lin J-y	21	21	16
6	(United States) F Corbett (United States) J Gai	23	16	21

==== Section 2 ====
First round
4	(Japan) H Suzuki (Japan) N Yamakita	21	21
(Canada) E Kwan (Canada) J Rymes	12	15
(Brazil) J Lima (Brazil) Sâm Lima	15	18
(Scotland) J MacPherson (Scotland) C Torrance	21	21
5	(Japan) R Hiramoto (Japan) K Ishikawa	21	21
(Australia) G Somerville (Canada) J Wu	12	11
(Japan) N Hara (Japan) R Kiyose	22	21
(Chinese Taipei) Hsieh M-y (Chinese Taipei) Yu C-h	20	17

Second round
4	(Japan) H Suzuki (Japan) N Yamakita	21	21
(Scotland) J MacPherson (Scotland) C Torrance	11	14
5	(Japan) R Hiramoto (Japan) K Ishikawa	13	21	21
(Japan) N Hara (Japan) R Kiyose	21	19	16

Quarter-finals
4	(Japan) H Suzuki (Japan) N Yamakita	21	21
5	(Japan) R Hiramoto (Japan) K Ishikawa	15	8

=== Bottom half ===
==== Section 3 ====
First round
Q2	(United States) C Ho (United States) S Pan	21	12	12
(United States) A Chang (United States) J Yeung	19	21	21
(Denmark) A C Kudsk (Denmark) S Pilgaard	13	19
7	(Ukraine) P Buhrova (Ukraine) Y Kantemyr	21	21
Q4	(Canada) E Goyette (Canada) J Zhang	12	9
(Canada) J Dent (Canada) C Lai	21	21
(Indonesia) S Kani (Hungary) Á Kőrösi	9	6
3	(Japan) K Osawa (Japan) M Tanabe	21	21

Second round
(United States) A Chang (United States) J Yeung	21	14	13
7	(Ukraine) P Buhrova (Ukraine) Y Kantemyr	9	21	21
(Canada) J Dent (Canada) C Lai	16	13
3	(Japan) K Osawa (Japan) M Tanabe	21	21

Quarter-finals
7	(Ukraine) P Buhrova (Ukraine) Y Kantemyr	8	21	15
3	(Japan) K Osawa (Japan) M Tanabe	21	19	21

==== Section 4 ====
First round
(England) A Harris (England) E van Leeuwen	21	21
(Canada) S Huang (Canada) E Zhang	8	14
(Denmark) K Vang (Denmark) M Werge	11	13
8	(Chinese Taipei) Lin C-c (Chinese Taipei) Yang C-y	21	21
Q1
(Spain) P Lopéz (Spain) L Rodríguez	w	/	o
(Canada) Ca Choi (United States) T Mertosono	14	6
2	(United States) L Lam (United States) A Lee	21	21

Second round
(England) A Harris (England) E van Leeuwen	12	9
8	(Chinese Taipei) Lin C-c (Chinese Taipei) Yang C-y	21	21
(Spain) P Lopéz (Spain) L Rodríguez	17	16
2	(United States) L Lam (United States) A Lee	21	21

Quarter-finals
8	(Chinese Taipei) Lin C-c (Chinese Taipei) Yang C-y	19	16
2	(United States) L Lam (United States) A Lee	21	21

== Mixed doubles ==
=== Seeds ===
1. (United States) Presley Smith / Jennie Gai (semi-finals)
2. (England) Callum Hemming / Estelle van Leeuwen (second round)
3. (France) Julien Maio / Léa Palermo (quarter-finals)
4. (Japan) Akira Koga / Natsu Saito (champions)
5. (Scotland) Alexander Dunn / Julie MacPherson (semi-finals)
6. (Spain) Rubén García / Lucía Rodríguez (second round)
7. (United States) Chen Zhi-yi / Francesca Corbett (second round)
8. (Japan) Haruki Kawabe / Kokona Ishikawa (quarter-finals)

=== Finals ===
Semi-finals
1	(United States) Presley Smith (United States) Jennie Gai	9	21
(Chinese Taipei) Liu Kuang-heng (Chinese Taipei) Hsu Yin-hui	21	23
4	(Japan) Akira Koga (Japan) Natsu Saito	21	12	23
5	(Scotland) Alexander Dunn (Scotland) Julie MacPherson	16	21	21

Final
(Chinese Taipei) Liu Kuang-heng (Chinese Taipei) Hsu Yin-hui	17	21	17
4	(Japan) Akira Koga (Japan) Natsu Saito	21	17	21

=== Top half ===
==== Section 1 ====
First round
1	(United States) P Smith (United States) J Gai	21	18	21
(Canada) T Lock (Canada) C Hoang	14	21	10
Q1	(United States) T Zhang (United States) A Chang	21	14	23
(Brazil) D Silva (Brazil) Sân Lima	17	21	25
6	(Spain) R García (Spain) L Rodríguez	21	21
(Chinese Taipei) Wu H-y (Chinese Taipei) Yang C-y	15	11
(England) S Jones (England) L Tolman	21	21
Q3	(Canada) K Pong (Canada) Ca Choi	11	6

Second round
1	(United States) P Smith (United States) J Gai	21	21	21
(Brazil) D Silva (Brazil) Sân Lima	14	23	12
6	(Spain) R García (Spain) L Rodríguez	14	15
(England) S Jones (England) L Tolman	21	21

Quarter-finals
1	(United States) P Smith (United States) J Gai	18	21	21
(England) S Jones (England) L Tolman	21	18	19

==== Section 2 ====
First round
3	(France) J Maio (France) L Palermo	21	21
(Germany) C Devereux (Germany) D Töpffer	5	4
(Canada) E Wong (Canada) T L Se	9	13
(Brazil) F Farias (Brazil) J Lima	21	21
7	(United States) Chen Z-y (United States) F Corbett	22	21
(Sweden) F Karlborg (Sweden) T Sjöö	20	14
(Chinese Taipei) Liu K-h (Chinese Taipei) Hsu Y-h	21	21
(Indonesia) A T Tololiu (Indonesia) S Kani	11	17

Second round
3	(France) J Maio (France) L Palermo	21	21
(Brazil) F Farias (Brazil) J Lima	12	6
7	(United States) Chen Z-y (United States) F Corbett	12	14
(Chinese Taipei) Liu K-h (Chinese Taipei) Hsu Y-h	21	21

Quarter-finals
3	(France) J Maio (France) L Palermo	16	15
(Chinese Taipei) Liu K-h (Chinese Taipei) Hsu Y-h	21	21

=== Bottom half ===
==== Section 3 ====
First round
(Canada) J Lai (Canada) C Lai	12	21	13
(Chinese Taipei) Lin B-w (Chinese Taipei) Lin J-y	21	17	21
(Czech Republic) O Král (Czech Republic) T Švábíková	9	13
8	(Japan) H Kawabe (Japan) K Ishikawa	21	21
(Thailand) Tonk Saeheng (Thailand) Tonr Saeheng	16	13
Q2	(Canada) R Huang (Canada) J Zhang	21	21
Q4	(Canada) D Leung (Canada) J Dent	16	15
4	(Japan) A Koga (Japan) N Saito	21	21

Second round
(Chinese Taipei) Lin B-w (Chinese Taipei) Lin J-y	20	20
8	(Japan) H Kawabe (Japan) K Ishikawa	22	22
Q2	(Canada) R Huang (Canada) J Zhang	6	13
4	(Japan) A Koga (Japan) N Saito	21	21

Quarter-finals
8	(Japan) H Kawabe (Japan) K Ishikawa	16	17
4	(Japan) A Koga (Japan) N Saito	21	21

==== Section 4 ====
First round
(United States) L Wang (United States) K Ngo	17	18
(Canada) Z Desjardins (Canada) S Huang	21	21
(Canada) T A Lindeman (Australia) G Somerville	11	15
5	(Scotland) A Dunn (Scotland) J MacPherson	21	21
(Canada) K Lee (Canada) E Zhang	13	21	11
(Denmark) K Kolding (Denmark) M Werge	21	18	21
(England) O Butler (England) A Harris
2	(England) C Hemming (England) E van Leeuwen	w	/	o

Second round
(Canada) Z Desjardins (Canada) S Huang	7	12
5	(Scotland) A Dunn (Scotland) J MacPherson	21	21
(Denmark) K Kolding (Denmark) M Werge	21	15	21
2	(England) C Hemming (England) E van Leeuwen	18	21	18

Quarter-finals
5	(Scotland) A Dunn (Scotland) J MacPherson	21	21
(Denmark) K Kolding (Denmark) M Werge	12	17

Preceded by 2026 U.S. Open	BWF World Tour; 2026 BWF season	Succeeded by 2026 Japan Open
