= 2025 Syed Modi International =

Badminton tournament in India

Tournament details
- Dates: 25–30 November
- Edition: 14th
- Level: Super 300
- Total prize money: US$240,000
- Venue: Babu Banarasi Das Indoor Stadium
- Location: Lucknow, India

Champions
- Men's singles: (Hong Kong) Jason Gunawan
- Women's singles: (Japan) Hina Akechi
- Men's doubles: (Malaysia) Kang Khai Xing (Malaysia) Aaron Tai
- Women's doubles: (India) Treesa Jolly (India) Gayatri Gopichand Pullela
- Mixed doubles: (Indonesia) Dejan Ferdinansyah (Indonesia) Bernadine Anindya Wardana

The 2025 Syed Modi International was a badminton tournament that took place at Babu Banarasi Das Indoor Stadium in Lucknow, India, from 25 to 30 November 2025. It had a total prize of $240,000.

== Tournament ==
The 2025 Syed Modi International was the thirty-seventh tournament of the 2025 BWF World Tour and the 2025 edition of the Syed Modi International championships, which have been held since 2009. This tournament was organized by the Badminton Association of India with sanction from the BWF.

=== Venue ===
This tournament was held at Babu Banarasi Das Indoor Stadium in Lucknow, India.

=== Point distribution ===
Below is the point distribution table for each phase of the tournament based on the BWF points system for the BWF World Tour Super 300 event.

Winner	Runner-up	3/4	5/8	9/16	17/32	33/64	65/128
7,000	5,950	4,900	3,850	2,750	1,670	660	320

=== Prize pool ===
The total prize money is US$240,000 with the distribution of the prize money in accordance with BWF regulations.

Event	Winner	Finalist	Semi-finals	Quarter-finals	Last 16
Singles	$18,000	$9,120	$3,480	$1,440	$840
Doubles	$18,960	$9,120	$3,360	$1,740	$900

== Men's singles ==
=== Seeds ===
1. (Singapore) Jason Teh (quarter-finals)
2. (India) Ayush Shetty (withdrew)
3. (India) Prannoy H. S. (second round)
4. (India) Kiran George (second round)
5. (India) Srikanth Kidambi (final)
6. (India) Tharun Mannepalli (second round)
7. (Japan) Yudai Okimoto (first round)
8. (Denmark) Magnus Johannesen (quarter-finals)

=== Finals ===
Semi-finals
PFQ	(Japan) Minoru Koga	21	8	0^{r}
(Hong Kong) Jason Gunawan	12	21	11
5	(India) Srikanth Kidambi	21	19	21
(India) Mithun Manjunath	15	21	13

Final
(Hong Kong) Jason Gunawan	21	8	22
5	(India) Srikanth Kidambi	16	21	20

=== Top half ===
==== Section 1 ====
First round
1	(Singapore) J Teh	21	21
(India) R Sanjeevi	19	17
PFQ	(India) L Sharma	16	21	19
(India) A Mishra	21	15	21
7	(Japan) Y Okimoto	13	15
PFQ	(Japan) M Koga	21	21
Q2	(India) B Raghav	19	9
PFQ	(India) S Gupta	21	21

Second round
1	(Singapore) J Teh	21	21
(India) A Mishra	15	15
PFQ	(Japan) M Koga	21	21
PFQ	(India) S Gupta	12	16

Quarter-finals
1	(Singapore) J Teh	19	21	20
PFQ	(Japan) M Koga	21	12	22

==== Section 2 ====
First round
4	(India) K George	21	21
(Israel) D Dubovenko	17	9
(Israel) M Zilberman	15	17
(Hong Kong) J Gunawan	21	21
8	(Denmark) M Johannesen	21	21
Q1	(India) O Chaliha	16	18
Q4	(India) A Bhivpathaki	21	14	6
(Sri Lanka) V Nettasinghe	19	21	21

Second round
4	(India) K George	19	16
(Hong Kong) J Gunawan	21	21
8	(Denmark) M Johannesen	21	21
(Sri Lanka) V Nettasinghe	12	17

Quarter-finals
(Hong Kong) J Gunawan	20	21	21
8	(Denmark) M Johannesen	22	16	19

=== Bottom half ===
==== Section 3 ====
First round
(India) R Bharadwaj	18	21	23
(India) T R Katam	21	16	21
(India) M Maisnam	18	14
SWM	(India) P Rajawat	21	21
Q3	(India) A Thakur	10	14
PFQ	(India) S Dayanand	21	21
(India) T Kavin	13	10
5	(India) S Kidambi	21	21

Second round
(India) R Bharadwaj	16	21	12
SWM	(India) P Rajawat	21	10	21
PFQ	(India) S Dayanand	6	16
5	(India) S Kidambi	21	21

Quarter-finals
SWM	(India) P Rajawat	14	4^{r}
5	(India) S Kidambi	21	11

==== Section 4 ====
First round
(India) M Manjunath	21	12	21
(Kazakhstan) D Panarin	18	21	10
(India) S Karunakaran	7	9
6	(India) T Mannepalli	21	21
(India) S Subramanian	13	21	17
(India) M Singh	21	14	21
PFQ	(India) S Dalal	15	10
3	(India) Prannoy H. S.	21	21

Second round
(India) M Manjunath	21	17	21
6	(India) T Mannepalli	16	21	17
(India) M Singh	21	21
3	(India) Prannoy H. S.	15	18

Quarter-finals
(India) M Manjunath	21	21
(India) M Singh	18	13

== Women's singles ==
=== Seeds ===
1. (India) Unnati Hooda (semi-finals)
2. (Japan) Nozomi Okuhara (second round)
3. (Chinese Taipei) Sung Shuo-yun (quarter-finals)
4. (Turkey) Neslihan Arın (final)
5. (Japan) Hina Akechi (champion)
6. (Ukraine) Polina Buhrova (second round)
7. (India) Rakshitha Ramraj (quarter-finals)
8. (India) Anupama Upadhyaya (second round)

=== Finals ===
Semi-finals
1	(India) Unnati Hooda	15	10
4	(Turkey) Neslihan Arın	21	21
5	(Japan) Hina Akechi	21	21
(India) Tanvi Sharma	17	16

Final
4	(Turkey) Neslihan Arın	16	14
5	(Japan) Hina Akechi	21	21

=== Top half ===
==== Section 1 ====
First round
1	(India) U Hooda	21	21
(India) A Kashyap	13	18
(India) A Bhatt	15	21	17
(India) T Mir	21	11	21
7	(India) R Ramraj	21	21
(India) S Lele	12	14
(India) D Sihag	23	21
Q1	(India) A Naik	21	15

Second round
1	(India) U Hooda	21	21
(India) T Mir	15	10
7	(India) R Ramraj	16	21	21
(India) D Sihag	21	19	17

Quarter-finals
1	(India) U Hooda	21	13	21
7	(India) R Ramraj	15	21	16

==== Section 2 ====
First round
4	(Turkey) N Arın	21	22
(India) S Valishetty	15	20
Q4	(United Arab Emirates) P Bharath	15	10
(India) M Singh	21	21
6	(Ukraine) P Buhrova	21	21
(Hungary) Á Kőrösi	15	10
(Chinese Taipei) Tung C-t	21	17	16
(India) I Baruah	14	21	21

Second round
4	(Turkey) N Arın	21	21
(India) M Singh	13	12
6	(Ukraine) P Buhrova	15	8
(India) I Baruah	21	21

Quarter-finals
4	(Turkey) N Arın	21	13	21
(India) I Baruah	19	21	15

=== Bottom half ===
==== Section 3 ====
First round
(India) T Hemanth	21	21
(Chinese Taipei) Hsieh Y-e	13	12
(India) A Kharb	8	10
5	(Japan) H Akechi	21	21
(Japan) S Masuki	21	21
Q3	(Hong Kong) Liang K W	19	16
(United States) I Jaiswal	16	21	17
3	(Chinese Taipei) Sung S-y	21	17	21

Second round
(India) T Hemanth	12	8
5	(Japan) H Akechi	21	21
(Japan) S Masuki	19	15
3	(Chinese Taipei) Sung S-y	21	21

Quarter-finals
5	(Japan) H Akechi	21	21
3	(Chinese Taipei) Sung S-y	8	15

==== Section 4 ====
First round
(Hong Kong) Lo S Y	21	21
(Ukraine) Y Kantemyr	16	17
(Uganda) F Mohamed Rafi	9	9
8	(India) A Upadhyaya	21	21
(India) T Sharma	21	21
(India) A Chaliha	15	19
Q2	(India) A Rao	20	14
2	(Japan) N Okuhara	22	21

Second round
(Hong Kong) Lo S Y	21	12	21
8	(India) A Upadhyaya	13	21	13
(India) T Sharma	13	21	21
2	(Japan) N Okuhara	21	16	19

Quarter-finals
(Hong Kong) Lo S Y	13	19
(India) T Sharma	21	21

== Men's doubles ==
=== Seeds ===
1. (Malaysia) Choong Hon Jian / Muhammad Haikal (withdrew)
2. (India) Pruthvi Roy / K. Sai Pratheek (second round)
3. (Malaysia) Chia Wei Jie / Lwi Sheng Hao (final)
4. (Chinese Taipei) He Zhi-wei / Huang Jui-hsuan (quarter-finals)
5. (India) Hariharan Amsakarunan / Arjun M. R. (quarter-finals)
6. (Malaysia) Kang Khai Xing / Aaron Tai (champions)
7. (Individual Neutral Athletes) Rodion Alimov / Maksim Ogloblin (semi-finals)
8. (India) Akshan Shetty / Sankar Udayakumar (second round)

=== Finals ===
Semi-finals
7	(Individual Neutral Athletes) Rodion Alimov (Individual Neutral Athletes) Maksim Ogloblin	15	20
6	(Malaysia) Kang Khai Xing (Malaysia) Aaron Tai	21	22
3	(Malaysia) Chia Wei Jie (Malaysia) Lwi Sheng Hao	21	16	21
(Malaysia) Muhammad Faiq (Malaysia) Lok Hong Quan	5	21	17

Final
6	(Malaysia) Kang Khai Xing (Malaysia) Aaron Tai	21	21
3	(Malaysia) Chia Wei Jie (Malaysia) Lwi Sheng Hao	9	19

=== Top half ===
==== Section 1 ====
First round
4	(Chinese Taipei) He Z-w (Chinese Taipei) Huang J-h	21	21
(India) S Chhetri (India) N Kumar	19	15
(Malaysia) B Goonting (Malaysia) Fazriq R	21	21
PFQ	(India) K Balamurugan (India) P Vaid	15	17
7	(Individual Neutral Athletes) R Alimov (Individual Neutral Athletes) M Ogloblin	19	21	21
(India) D Konthoujam (India) A Mohammad	21	16	14
(India) A Diwakar (India) K Thangam	20	21	19
(India) Viplav Kuvale (India) Viraj Kuvale	22	16	21

Second round
4	(Chinese Taipei) He Z-w (Chinese Taipei) Huang J-h	21	21
(Malaysia) B Goonting (Malaysia) Fazriq R	12	18
7	(Individual Neutral Athletes) R Alimov (Individual Neutral Athletes) M Ogloblin	21	14	25
(India) Viplav Kuvale (India) Viraj Kuvale	16	21	23

Quarter-finals
4	(Chinese Taipei) He Z-w (Chinese Taipei) Huang J-h	11	16
7	(Individual Neutral Athletes) R Alimov (Individual Neutral Athletes) M Ogloblin	21	21

==== Section 2 ====
First round
6	(Malaysia) Kang K X (Malaysia) A Tai	21	21
(India) N Prasanth (India) D Vel Murugan	11	12
(Denmark) C Kjær (Denmark) R Kjær	21	21
Q3	(India) M Rana (India) A Sapiah	9	10
5	(India) H Amsakarunan (India) Arjun M. R.	21	21
(India) A Makhija (India) S Tamboli	11	13
(India) S Goala (India) D Rawat	15	14
(Malaysia) Lau Y S (Malaysia) Lim T J	21	21

Second round
6	(Malaysia) Kang K X (Malaysia) A Tai	19	21	21
(Denmark) C Kjær (Denmark) R Kjær	21	19	15
5	(India) H Amsakarunan (India) Arjun M. R.	21	21
(Malaysia) Lau Y S (Malaysia) Lim T J	12	18

Quarter-finals
6	(Malaysia) Kang K X (Malaysia) A Tai	22	14	21
5	(India) H Amsakarunan (India) Arjun M. R.	20	21	13

=== Bottom half ===
==== Section 3 ====
First round
Q1	(India) B Chhabra (India) P Choudhary	19	17
Q4	(India) A Surya (India) G Vittalji	21	21
(India) A Thakore (India) D Thakore	9	13
SWM	(United Arab Emirates) Dev Ayyappan (United Arab Emirates) Dhiren Ayyappan	21	21
(India) H Baskaran (India) Bharathsanjai S	21	13	21
(India) A Mohanty (India) A Pattanayak	12	21	11
(India) B Arigela (India) V Gobburu	16	14
3	(Malaysia) Chia W J (Malaysia) Lwi S H	21	21

Second round
Q4	(India) A Surya (India) G Vittalji	16	11
SWM	(United Arab Emirates) Dev Ayyappan (United Arab Emirates) Dhiren Ayyappan	21	21
(India) H Baskaran (India) Bharathsanjai S	16	12
3	(Malaysia) Chia W J (Malaysia) Lwi S H	21	21

Quarter-finals
SWM	(United Arab Emirates) Dev Ayyappan (United Arab Emirates) Dhiren Ayyappan	18	13
3	(Malaysia) Chia W J (Malaysia) Lwi S H	21	21

==== Section 4 ====
First round
(Malaysia) Goh B Z (Malaysia) Wong V S	15	16
(Japan) M Onodera (Japan) D Tanioka	21	21
Q2	(India) A Agarwal (India) D Gautam	10	27	10
8	(India) A Shetty (India) S Udayakumar	21	25	21
(Malaysia) Boon X Y (Malaysia) Lee Y B	19	21	14
(Malaysia) M Faiq (Malaysia) Lok H Q	21	16	21
(India) S Bora (India) N Ranjan	8	17
2	(India) P Roy (India) K. Sai Pratheek	21	21

Second round
(Japan) M Onodera (Japan) D Tanioka	21	13	21
8	(India) A Shetty (India) S Udayakumar	10	21	17
(Malaysia) M Faiq (Malaysia) Lok H Q	21	19	21
2	(India) P Roy (India) K. Sai Pratheek	18	21	12

Quarter-finals
(Japan) M Onodera (Japan) D Tanioka	16	15
(Malaysia) M Faiq (Malaysia) Lok H Q	21	21

== Women's doubles ==
=== Seeds ===
1. (India) Treesa Jolly / Gayatri Gopichand (champions)
2. (Chinese Taipei) Hsu Ya-ching / Sung Yu-hsuan (semi-finals)
3. (Chinese Taipei) Sung Shuo-yun / Yu Chien-hui (second round)
4. (Ukraine) Polina Buhrova / Yevheniia Kantemyr (second round)
5. (Indonesia) Apriyani Rahayu / Siti Fadia Silva Ramadhanti (withdrew)
6. (Turkey) Bengisu Erçetin / Nazlıcan İnci (quarter-finals)
7. (Malaysia) Ong Xin Yee / Carmen Ting (semi-finals)
8. (Japan) Kaho Osawa / Mai Tanabe (final)

=== Finals ===
Semi-finals
1	(India) Treesa Jolly (India) Gayatri Gopichand	21	21
7	(Malaysia) Ong Xin Yee (Malaysia) Carmen Ting	11	15
8	(Japan) Kaho Osawa (Japan) Mai Tanabe	21	21
2	(Chinese Taipei) Hsu Ya-ching (Chinese Taipei) Sung Yu-hsuan	15	19

Final
1	(India) Treesa Jolly (India) Gayatri Gopichand	17	21	21
8	(Japan) Kaho Osawa (Japan) Mai Tanabe	21	13	15

=== Top half ===
==== Section 1 ====
First round
1	(India) T Jolly (India) G Gopichand	19	22	21
(Malaysia) Cheng S H (Malaysia) Tan Z Y	21	20	9
Q3	(India) Z Abbigail (India) L Srivastava	21	21
Q4	(India) H Dubey (India) R Toor	11	12
6	(Turkey) B Erçetin (Turkey) N İnci	21	24
(Indonesia) S S Azzahra (Indonesia) A Z D Ramadhani	15	22
Q2	(India) V R Nardhana (India) R Ramasamy	19	22	17
(India) V Khadkekar (India) A Khan	21	20	21

Second round
1	(India) T Jolly (India) G Gopichand	21	21
Q3	(India) Z Abbigail (India) L Srivastava	17	12
6	(Turkey) B Erçetin (Turkey) N İnci	21	23
(India) V Khadkekar (India) A Khan	7	21

Quarter-finals
1	(India) T Jolly (India) G Gopichand	21	21
6	(Turkey) B Erçetin (Turkey) N İnci	15	16

==== Section 2 ====
First round
4	(Ukraine) P Buhrova (Ukraine) Y Kantemyr	21	21
(India) S Gahlawat (India) T Singh	9	19
(India) R Evangelin (India) Sa Singh	8	11
(India) P Konjengbam (India) S Mishra	21	21
7	(Malaysia) Ong X Y (Malaysia) C Ting	21	21
(India) D Singh (India) So Singh	12	15
(India) R Panda (India) S Panda	18	13
(Malaysia) Chong J Y (Malaysia) V Ng	21	21

Second round
4	(Ukraine) P Buhrova (Ukraine) Y Kantemyr	17	22
(India) P Konjengbam (India) S Mishra	21	24
7	(Malaysia) Ong X Y (Malaysia) C Ting	21	21
(Malaysia) Chong J Y (Malaysia) V Ng	8	8

Quarter-finals
(India) P Konjengbam (India) S Mishra	13	20
7	(Malaysia) Ong X Y (Malaysia) C Ting	21	22

=== Bottom half ===
==== Section 3 ====
First round
Q1	(India) A Sunil (India) V Sri	11	18
(India) G Rawat (India) M Rawat	21	21
(Chinese Taipei) Chen H-n (Chinese Taipei) Hsieh M-y	19	16
8	(Japan) K Osawa (Japan) M Tanabe	21	21
(Australia) L C Griselda (Australia) N Shimizu	16	11
(Indonesia) I S Meida (Indonesia) R K Nastine	21	21
PFQ	(India) A Balan (India) D Balasubramanian	6	9
3	(Chinese Taipei) Sung S-y (Chinese Taipei) Yu C-h	21	21

Second round
(India) G Rawat (India) M Rawat	11	11
8	(Japan) K Osawa (Japan) M Tanabe	21	21
(Indonesia) I S Meida (Indonesia) R K Nastine	21	21
3	(Chinese Taipei) Sung S-y (Chinese Taipei) Yu C-h	16	8

Quarter-finals
8	(Japan) K Osawa (Japan) M Tanabe	21	21
(Indonesia) I S Meida (Indonesia) R K Nastine	16	10

==== Section 4 ====
First round
(India) A Bhat (India) S Gautam	21	21
(India) M Khan (India) A Pravin	12	10
(India) R Ganesh (India) S Sikkandar	6	11
SWM	(Chinese Taipei) Lin X-m (Chinese Taipei) Wang Y-q	21	21
(United Arab Emirates) M O Khan (United Arab Emirates) T Khan	21	18	13
(Chinese Taipei) Cheng C-y (Chinese Taipei) Hsieh Y-t	16	21	21
(India) K Selvam (India) S Singhi	19	17
2	(Chinese Taipei) Hsu Y-c (Chinese Taipei) Sung Y-h	21	21

Second round
(India) A Bhat (India) S Gautam	8	14
SWM	(Chinese Taipei) Lin X-m (Chinese Taipei) Wang Y-q	21	21
(Chinese Taipei) Cheng C-y (Chinese Taipei) Hsieh Y-t	9	10
2	(Chinese Taipei) Hsu Y-c (Chinese Taipei) Sung Y-h	21	21

Quarter-finals
SWM	(Chinese Taipei) Lin X-m (Chinese Taipei) Wang Y-q	9	10
2	(Chinese Taipei) Hsu Y-c (Chinese Taipei) Sung Y-h	21	21

== Mixed doubles ==
=== Seeds ===
1. (Singapore) Terry Hee / Jin Yujia (second round)
2. (India) Rohan Kapoor / Ruthvika Gadde (second round)
3. (Malaysia) Wong Tien Ci / Lim Chiew Sien (quarter-finals)
4. (Indonesia) Marwan Faza / Aisyah Pranata (semi-finals)
5. (India) Sathish Karunakaran / Aadya Variyath (second round)
6. (India) Ashith Surya / Amrutha Pramuthesh (second round)
7. (Thailand) Pakkapon Teeraratsakul / Sapsiree Taerattanachai (final)
8. (Indonesia) Dejan Ferdinansyah / Bernadine Wardana (champions)

=== Finals ===
Semi-finals
7	(Thailand) Pakkapon Teeraratsakul (Thailand) Sapsiree Taerattanachai	21	21
4	(Indonesia) Marwan Faza (Indonesia) Aisyah Pranata	10	12
8	(Indonesia) Dejan Ferdinansyah (Indonesia) Bernadine Wardana	21	21
(India) Hariharan Amsakarunan (India) Treesa Jolly	17	19

Final
7	(Thailand) Pakkapon Teeraratsakul (Thailand) Sapsiree Taerattanachai	19	16
8	(Indonesia) Dejan Ferdinansyah (Indonesia) Bernadine Wardana	21	21

=== Top half ===
==== Section 1 ====
First round
1	(Singapore) T Hee (Singapore) Jin YJ	23	21
PFQ	(India) A Makhija (India) S Singhi	21	10
(India) S Dhanraj (India) A Pai	10	18
(Malaysia) Wee Y H (Malaysia) V Gobi	21	21
7	(Thailand) P Teeraratsakul (Thailand) S Taerattanachai	21	21
(India) G Vittalji (India) S Singh	7	6
Q3	(India) C Lalramsanga (India) T Suri	25	21
Q1	(India) B Chhabra (India) V Toppo	23	14

Second round
1	(Singapore) T Hee (Singapore) Jin YJ
(Malaysia) Wee Y H (Malaysia) V Gobi	w	/	o
7	(Thailand) P Teeraratsakul (Thailand) S Taerattanachai	21	21
Q3	(India) C Lalramsanga (India) T Suri	12	19

Quarter-finals
(Malaysia) Wee Y H (Malaysia) V Gobi	14	11
7	(Thailand) P Teeraratsakul (Thailand) S Taerattanachai	21	21

==== Section 2 ====
First round
4	(Indonesia) M Faza (Indonesia) A Pranata	22	21
(Malaysia) Low H C (Malaysia) Chan W T	20	12
(India) D Rawat (India) K. Maneesha	21	21
(Turkey) E Sönmez (Turkey) Y Bektaş	14	11
5	(India) S Karunakaran (India) A Variyath	21	21
(India) A Dash (India) P Panda	16	5
(India) S Gajendran (India) V Khadkekar	15	15
Q4	(India) Nithin H. V. (India) S Narayanan	21	21

Second round
4	(Indonesia) M Faza (Indonesia) A Pranata	21	17	21
(India) D Rawat (India) K. Maneesha	19	21	10
5	(India) S Karunakaran (India) A Variyath	17	19
Q4	(India) Nithin H. V. (India) S Narayanan	21	21

Quarter-finals
4	(Indonesia) M Faza (Indonesia) A Pranata	21	21
Q4	(India) Nithin H. V. (India) S Narayanan	11	12

=== Bottom half ===
==== Section 3 ====
First round
(India) R Mohankumar (India) R Ramasamy	11	15
Q2	(India) M P. Krishnan (India) V Prabhuanand	21	21
(United Arab Emirates) Dhiren Ayyappan (United Arab Emirates) T Khan	16	9
8	(Indonesia) D Ferdinansyah (Indonesia) B Wardana	21	21
(India) F S Aman (India) R Panda	21	21
(India) M Jaglan (India) L Jaglan	9	13
(India) A Agarwal (India) S Mishra	18	14
3	(Malaysia) Wong T C (Malaysia) Lim C S	21	21

Second round
Q2	(India) M P. Krishnan (India) V Prabhuanand	12	6
8	(Indonesia) D Ferdinansyah (Indonesia) B Wardana	21	21
(India) F S Aman (India) R Panda	9	13
3	(Malaysia) Wong T C (Malaysia) Lim C S	21	21

Quarter-finals
8	(Indonesia) D Ferdinansyah (Indonesia) B Wardana	21	12	21
3	(Malaysia) Wong T C (Malaysia) Lim C S	15	21	10

==== Section 4 ====
First round
(Australia) A Ramadiansyah (Australia) N Shimizu	21	21
(Ukraine) O Titov (Ukraine) Y Kantemyr	12	18
(India) N Kumar (India) R Thaker	15	13
6	(India) A Surya (India) A Pramuthesh	21	21
(India) H Amsakarunan (India) T Jolly	21	21
(India) I Bhatnagar (India) A Balachandra	13	17
(India) S Subramanian (India) D Balasubramanian	5	7
2	(India) R Kapoor (India) R Gadde	21	21

Second round
(Australia) A Ramadiansyah (Australia) N Shimizu	21	21
6	(India) A Surya (India) A Pramuthesh	17	15
(India) H Amsakarunan (India) T Jolly	24	21
2	(India) R Kapoor (India) R Gadde	22	15

Quarter-finals
(Australia) A Ramadiansyah (Australia) N Shimizu	18	14
(India) H Amsakarunan (India) T Jolly	21	21

Preceded by 2025 Australian Open	BWF World Tour; 2025 BWF season	Succeeded by 2025 Guwahati Masters
