= 2025 Canada Open =

Tournament details
- Dates: 1–6 July
- Edition: 60th
- Level: Super 300
- Total prize money: US$240,000
- Venue: Markham Pan Am Centre
- Location: Markham, Ontario, Canada

Champions
- Men's singles: (Japan) Kenta Nishimoto
- Women's singles: (Japan) Manami Suizu
- Men's doubles: (Chinese Taipei) Lee Fang-chih (Chinese Taipei) Lee Fang-jen
- Women's doubles: (Thailand) Benyapa Aimsaard (Thailand) Nuntakarn Aimsaard
- Mixed doubles: (Thailand) Ruttanapak Oupthong (Thailand) Jhenicha Sudjaipraparat

The 2025 Canada Open (officially known as the Yonex Canada Open 2025 for sponsorship reasons) was a badminton tournament which took place at Markham Pan Am Centre in Markham, Ontario, Canada, from 1 July to 6 July 2025 and had a total purse of $240,000.

== Tournament ==
The 2025 Canada Open was the sixteenth tournament of the 2025 BWF World Tour and also part of the Canada Open championships, which has been held since 1957. This tournament was organized by the Badminton Canada and sanctioned by the BWF. In 2025, the Canada Open has been downgraded from BWF World Tour Super 500 to Super 300.

=== Venue ===
This international tournament was held at the Markham Pan Am Centre in Markham, Ontario, Canada.

=== Point distribution ===
Below is the point distribution table for each phase of the tournament based on the BWF points system for the BWF World Tour Super 300 event.

Winner	Runner-up	3/4	5/8	9/16	17/32	33/64	65/128
7,000	5,950	4,900	3,850	2,750	1,670	660	320

=== Prize pool ===
The total prize money was US$240,000 with the distribution of the prize money in accordance with BWF regulations.

Event	Winner	Finalist	Semi-finals	Quarter-finals	Last 16
Singles	$18,000	$9,120	$3,480	$1,440	$840
Doubles	$18,960	$9,120	$3,360	$1,740	$900

== Men's singles ==
=== Seeds ===
1. (Chinese Taipei) Chou Tien-chen (quarter-finals)
2. (Japan) Kodai Naraoka (semi-finals)
3. (Japan) Kenta Nishimoto (champion)
4. (Canada) Brian Yang (first round)
5. (India) Ayush Shetty (first round)
6. (Chinese Taipei) Su Li-yang (second round)
7. (India) Priyanshu Rajawat (first round)
8. (India) Kiran George (withdrew)

=== Finals ===
Semi-finals
(India) Srikanth Kidambi	21	14	18
3	(Japan) Kenta Nishimoto	19	21	21
Q4	(Canada) Victor Lai	21	16	21
2	(Japan) Kodai Naraoka	19	21	17

Final
3	(Japan) Kenta Nishimoto	21	21
Q4	(Canada) Victor Lai	13	14

=== Top half ===
==== Section 1 ====
First round
1	(Chinese Taipei) Chou T-c	18	21	21
(Belgium) J Carraggi	21	8	17
(Chinese Taipei) Huang P-h	12	21	21
Q1	(Germany) F Roth	21	15	16
7	(India) P Rajawat	21	19	14
(India) S Kidambi	18	21	21
(Chinese Taipei) Wang P-w	25	21
(Malaysia) J Hoh	23	10

Second round
1	(Chinese Taipei) Chou T-c	21	17	21
(Chinese Taipei) Huang P-h	11	21	6
(India) S Kidambi	21	21
(Chinese Taipei) Wang P-w	19	14

Quarter-finals
1	(Chinese Taipei) Chou T-c	18	9
(India) S Kidambi	21	21

==== Section 2 ====
First round
3	(Japan) K Nishimoto	19	21	21
(Denmark) M Christophersen	21	9	14
(Finland) J Oldorff	21	21
Q2	(Chinese Taipei) Kuo K-l	17	16
5	(India) A Shetty	21	12
(India) S Subramanian	23	21
(Chinese Taipei) Huang Y-k	21	9	27
(Denmark) M Johannesen	19	21	25

Second round
3	(Japan) K Nishimoto	21	21
(Finland) J Oldorff	19	12
(India) S Subramanian	21	21
(Chinese Taipei) Huang Y-k	19	14

Quarter-finals
3	(Japan) K Nishimoto	21	5	21
(India) S Subramanian	15	21	17

=== Bottom half ===
==== Section 3 ====
First round
PFQ	(Germany) M Kicklitz	21	21
(Japan) S Ogawa	16	6
Q3	(Malaysia) E Ewe	w	/	o
SWM	(Japan) T Obayashi
(Japan) K Takahashi	17	18
(France) A Merklé	21	21
Q4	(Canada) V Lai	21	21
4	(Canada) B Yang	12	10

Second round
PFQ	(Germany) M Kicklitz	21	14	18
Q3	(Malaysia) E Ewe	13	21	21
(France) A Merklé	21	18	13
Q4	(Canada) V Lai	12	21	21

Quarter-finals
Q3	(Malaysia) E Ewe	6	21	9
Q4	(Canada) V Lai	21	11	21

==== Section 4 ====
First round
(Israel) M Zilberman	12	19
(Japan) R Hatano	21	21
(Finland) K Koljonen	12	15
6	(Chinese Taipei) Su L-y	21	21
(Vietnam) Nguyễn H Đ	21	21
(Vietnam) Lê Đ P	12	7
(Chinese Taipei) Liao J-f	12	11
2	(Japan) K Naraoka	21	21

Second round
(Japan) R Hatano	21	21
6	(Chinese Taipei) Su L-y	18	19
(Vietnam) Nguyễn H Đ	10	11
2	(Japan) K Naraoka	21	21

Quarter-finals
(Japan) R Hatano	18	15
2	(Japan) K Naraoka	21	21

== Women's singles ==
=== Seeds ===
1. (Canada) Michelle Li (semi-finals)
2. (Vietnam) Nguyễn Thùy Linh (final)
3. (Chinese Taipei) Sung Shuo-yun (second round)
4. (Chinese Taipei) Hsu Wen-chi (first round)
5. (Denmark) Line Christophersen (first round)
6. (Japan) Manami Suizu (champion)
7. (Ukraine) Polina Buhrova (first round)
8. (Japan) Nozomi Okuhara (quarter-finals)

=== Finals ===
Semi-finals
1	(Canada) Michelle Li	18	13
6	(Japan) Manami Suizu	21	21
(Denmark) Amalie Schulz	23	11	10
2	(Vietnam) Nguyễn Thùy Linh	21	21	21

Final
6	(Japan) Manami Suizu	21	21
2	(Vietnam) Nguyễn Thùy Linh	12	14

=== Top half ===
==== Section 1 ====
First round
1	(Canada) M Li	21	14	21
(Thailand) P Opatniputh	12	21	17
(Chinese Taipei) Huang C-p	15	13
(Chinese Taipei) Liang T-y	21	21
8	(Japan) N Okuhara	21	21
(Czech Republic) T Švábíková	19	12
(Bulgaria) K Nalbantova	21	21
Q2	(India) I Sharma	9	14

Second round
1	(Canada) M Li	21	18	21
(Chinese Taipei) Liang T-y	12	21	16
8	(Japan) N Okuhara	15	21	21
(Bulgaria) K Nalbantova	21	14	17

Quarter-finals
1	(Canada) M Li	21	19	21
8	(Japan) N Okuhara	7	21	19

==== Section 2 ====
First round
4	(Chinese Taipei) Hsu W-c	20	11
(Chinese Taipei) Huang Y-h	22	21
Q3	(Canada) C Hoang	21	21
(Germany) Y Li	15	18
6	(Japan) M Suizu	21	19	21
(Chinese Taipei) Tung C-t	17	21	16
(Peru) I Castillo	9	18
(Canada) W Y Zhang	21	21

Second round
(Chinese Taipei) Huang Y-h	21	21
Q3	(Canada) C Hoang	14	18
6	(Japan) M Suizu	21	21
(Canada) W Y Zhang	7	16

Quarter-finals
(Chinese Taipei) Huang Y-h	8	15
6	(Japan) M Suizu	21	21

=== Bottom half ===
==== Section 3 ====
First round
(Malaysia) Letshanaa K	21	21
(United States) I Jaiswal	13	5
(India) S Valishetty	21	22
7	(Ukraine) P Buhrova	18	20
(Brazil) J Vieira	18	19
(Denmark) A Schulz	21	21
(India) T Hemanth	21	22	18
3	(Chinese Taipei) Sung S-y	15	24	21

Second round
(Malaysia) Letshanaa K	15	14
(India) S Valishetty	21	21
(Denmark) A Schulz	24	20	22
3	(Chinese Taipei) Sung S-y	22	22	20

Quarter-finals
(India) S Valishetty	21	19	19
(Denmark) A Schulz	12	21	21

==== Section 4 ====
First round
Q1	(Spain) C Azurmendi	w	/	o
(Chinese Taipei) Hung Y-t
(Malaysia) Wong L C	12	21	21
5	(Denmark) L Christophersen	21	18	18
Q4	(Chinese Taipei) Chen S-y	21	21	21
(Canada) R Chan	23	15	11
(Hungary) V Sándorházi	12	14
2	(Vietnam) Nguyễn T L	21	21

Second round
Q1	(Spain) C Azurmendi	17	7
(Malaysia) Wong L C	21	21
Q4	(Chinese Taipei) Chen S-y	21	7	10
2	(Vietnam) Nguyễn T L	19	21	21

Quarter-finals
(Malaysia) Wong L C	21	20	15
2	(Vietnam) Nguyễn T L	17	22	21

== Men's doubles ==
=== Seeds ===
1. (Chinese Taipei) Lee Fang-chih / Lee Fang-jen (champions)
2. (United States) Chen Zhi-yi / Presley Smith (first round)
3. (Scotland) Christopher Grimley / Matthew Grimley (quarter-finals)
4. (Chinese Taipei) Lu Ming-che / Tang Kai-wei (withdrew)
5. (Canada) Kevin Lee / Ty Alexander Lindeman (first round)
6. (Chinese Taipei) Chen Zhi-ray / Lin Yu-chieh (second round)
7. (Denmark) William Kryger Boe / Christian Faust Kjær (quarter-finals)
8. (France) Maël Cattoen / Lucas Renoir (second round)

=== Finals ===
Semi-finals
1	(Chinese Taipei) Lee Fang-chih (Chinese Taipei) Lee Fang-jen	21	21
(Chinese Taipei) He Zhi-wei (Chinese Taipei) Huang Jui-hsuan	11	19
SWM	(Chinese Taipei) Chang Ko-chi (Chinese Taipei) Po Li-wei	15	22	21
(Chinese Taipei) Wei Chun-wei (Chinese Taipei) Yang Po-chih	21	20	19

Final
1	(Chinese Taipei) Lee Fang-chih (Chinese Taipei) Lee Fang-jen	21	21
SWM	(Chinese Taipei) Chang Ko-chi (Chinese Taipei) Po Li-wei	19	19

=== Top half ===
==== Section 1 ====
First round
1	(Chinese Taipei) Lee F-c (Chinese Taipei) Lee F-j	21	21
(Brazil) F Farias (Brazil) D Silva	16	15
(England) R Easton (England) A Green	17	21	21
(Germany) B Geiss (Germany) J R Jansen	21	11	19
6	(Chinese Taipei) Chen Z-r (Chinese Taipei) Lin Y-c	21	21
Q4	(Indonesia) R A Saputro (Indonesia) G C W Wijaya	17	15
(Chinese Taipei) Chen C-k (Chinese Taipei) Lin B-w	21	21
(Spain) R García (Spain) C Piris	10	13

Second round
1	(Chinese Taipei) Lee F-c (Chinese Taipei) Lee F-j	21	21
(England) R Easton (England) A Green	12	11
6	(Chinese Taipei) Chen Z-r (Chinese Taipei) Lin Y-c	16	15
(Chinese Taipei) Chen C-k (Chinese Taipei) Lin B-w	21	21

Quarter-finals
1	(Chinese Taipei) Lee F-c (Chinese Taipei) Lee F-j	21	21
(Chinese Taipei) Chen C-k (Chinese Taipei) Lin B-w	17	12

==== Section 2 ====
First round
3	(Scotland) C Grimley (Scotland) M Grimley	21	21
Q1	(Canada) K M Deraj (Canada) V Ho	10	9
(France) J Maio (France) W Villeger	21	21
(Brazil) I Batalha (Brazil) M Voigt	10	15
5	(Canada) K Lee (Canada) T A Lindeman	13	19
(Chinese Taipei) Lai P-y (Chinese Taipei) Tsai F-c	21	21
(Chinese Taipei) He Z-w (Chinese Taipei) Huang J-h	21	21
PFQ	(Canada) A Dong (Indonesia) A T Tololiu	19	16

Second round
3	(Scotland) C Grimley (Scotland) M Grimley	21	21
(France) J Maio (France) W Villeger	16	14
(Chinese Taipei) Lai P-y (Chinese Taipei) Tsai F-c	21	16	15
(Chinese Taipei) He Z-w (Chinese Taipei) Huang J-h	17	21	21

Quarter-finals
3	(Scotland) C Grimley (Scotland) M Grimley	16	21	14
(Chinese Taipei) He Z-w (Chinese Taipei) Huang J-h	21	17	21

=== Bottom half ===
==== Section 3 ====
First round
Q2	(Canada) D Leung (Canada) T Lock	24	19	21
(Republic of Ireland) S Guildea (Republic of Ireland) P Reynolds	22	21	23
(Denmark) R Espersen (Denmark) A Søndergaard	19	16
SWM	(Chinese Taipei) Chang K-c (Chinese Taipei) Po L-w	21	21
(Chinese Taipei) Chiang C-w (Chinese Taipei) Wu H-y	21	21
(Canada) A Bedi (Canada) A Mao	5	3
(Czech Republic) J Král (Czech Republic) O Král	21	19
8	(France) M Cattoen (France) L Renoir	23	21

Second round
(Republic of Ireland) S Guildea (Republic of Ireland) P Reynolds	14	11
SWM	(Chinese Taipei) Chang K-c (Chinese Taipei) Po L-w	21	21
(Chinese Taipei) Chiang C-w (Chinese Taipei) Wu H-y	21	21
8	(France) M Cattoen (France) L Renoir	18	13

Quarter-finals
SWM	(Chinese Taipei) Chang K-c (Chinese Taipei) Po L-w	21	19	22
(Chinese Taipei) Chiang C-w (Chinese Taipei) Wu H-y	16	21	20

==== Section 4 ====
First round
Q3	(Canada) M Ji (Canada) F S Zhang	18	11
(Canada) J Lai (Canada) N Yakura	21	21
(Chinese Taipei) Su C-h (Chinese Taipei) Wu G-x	12	21	13
7	(Denmark) W K Boe (Denmark) C F Kjær	21	18	21
(Japan) T Aizawa (Japan) D Sano	21	21
(Germany) M Bourakkadi (Germany) K Neumann	15	11
(Chinese Taipei) Wei C-w (Chinese Taipei) Yang P-c	21	21
2	(United States) Chen Z-y (United States) P Smith	15	16

Second round
(Canada) J Lai (Canada) N Yakura	12	11
7	(Denmark) W K Boe (Denmark) C F Kjær	21	21
(Japan) T Aizawa (Japan) D Sano	21	18	17
(Chinese Taipei) Wei C-w (Chinese Taipei) Yang P-c	19	21	21

Quarter-finals
7	(Denmark) W K Boe (Denmark) C F Kjær	13	10
(Chinese Taipei) Wei C-w (Chinese Taipei) Yang P-c	21	21

== Women's doubles ==
=== Seeds ===
1. (Chinese Taipei) Hsu Yin-hui / Lin Jhih-yun (semi-finals)
2. (Chinese Taipei) Chang Ching-hui / Yang Ching-tun (semi-finals)
3. (Thailand) Benyapa Aimsaard / Nuntakarn Aimsaard (champions)
4. (Ukraine) Polina Buhrova / Yevheniia Kantemyr (second round)
5. (Chinese Taipei) Hu Ling-fang / Jheng Yu-chieh (quarter-finals)
6. (Chinese Taipei) Hsu Ya-ching / Sung Yu-hsuan (quarter-finals)
7. (Canada) Jackie Dent / Crystal Lai (quarter-finals)
8. (Japan) Kaho Osawa / Mai Tanabe (final)

=== Finals ===
Semi-finals
1	(Chinese Taipei) Hsu Yin-hui (Chinese Taipei) Lin Jhih-yun	13	17
3	(Thailand) Benyapa Aimsaard (Thailand) Nuntakarn Aimsaard	21	21
8	(Japan) Kaho Osawa (Japan) Mai Tanabe	21	21
2	(Chinese Taipei) Chang Ching-hui (Chinese Taipei) Yang Ching-tun	7	17

Final
3	(Thailand) Benyapa Aimsaard (Thailand) Nuntakarn Aimsaard	21	21
8	(Japan) Kaho Osawa (Japan) Mai Tanabe	12	18

=== Top half ===
==== Section 1 ====
First round
1	(Chinese Taipei) Hsu Y-h (Chinese Taipei) Lin J-y	21	21
(Canada) E Meng (Canada) S Nong	7	5
(Australia) G Somerville (Australia) A Yu	21	21
(Canada) C Choi (Canada) S Huang	15	9
5	(Chinese Taipei) Hu L-f (Chinese Taipei) Jheng Y-c	22	21	23
(Spain) C Azurmendi (Spain) L Rodríguez	24	16	21
(United States) A Chang (United States) J Yeung	17	16
Q1	(Chinese Taipei) Hung Y-e (Chinese Taipei) Lin Y-y	21	21

Second round
1	(Chinese Taipei) Hsu Y-h (Chinese Taipei) Lin J-y	15	21	21
(Australia) G Somerville (Australia) A Yu	21	15	17
5	(Chinese Taipei) Hu L-f (Chinese Taipei) Jheng Y-c	21	21
Q1	(Chinese Taipei) Hung Y-e (Chinese Taipei) Lin Y-y	16	19

Quarter-finals
1	(Chinese Taipei) Hsu Y-h (Chinese Taipei) Lin J-y	16	21	21
5	(Chinese Taipei) Hu L-f (Chinese Taipei) Jheng Y-c	21	16	19

==== Section 2 ====
First round
3	(Thailand) B Aimsaard (Thailand) N Aimsaard	21	21
(Chinese Taipei) Chen S-y (Chinese Taipei) Hsieh Y-e	11	12
(Denmark) N Anthonisen (Denmark) A C Kudsk	21	13	19
(United States) F Corbett (United States) J Gai	19	21	21
6	(Chinese Taipei) Hsu Y-c (Chinese Taipei) Sung Y-h	21	21
(Chinese Taipei) Chen Y-f (Chinese Taipei) Sun L-c	17	18
(Canada) E Zhang (Canada) W Y Zhang	21	21
(Switzerland) L Amiguet (Switzerland) C Racloz	18	19

Second round
3	(Thailand) B Aimsaard (Thailand) N Aimsaard	21	21
(United States) F Corbett (United States) J Gai	14	15
6	(Chinese Taipei) Hsu Y-c (Chinese Taipei) Sung Y-h	w	/	o
(Canada) E Zhang (Canada) W Y Zhang

Quarter-finals
3	(Thailand) B Aimsaard (Thailand) N Aimsaard	18	21	21
6	(Chinese Taipei) Hsu Y-c (Chinese Taipei) Sung Y-h	21	12	11

=== Bottom half ===
==== Section 3 ====
First round
(France) M Lambert (France) C Pognante	21	21
(Denmark) S Pilgaard (Denmark) S Schulz	15	13
(Germany) S Hübsch (Germany) A Lehmann	10	9
8	(Japan) K Osawa (Japan) M Tanabe	21	21
(United States) L Lam (United States) A Lee	21	21
(Germany) L Michalski (Germany) T P Nguyen	7	12
Q2	(Canada) E Goyette (Canada) J Zhang	13	8
4	(Ukraine) P Buhrova (Ukraine) Y Kantemyr	21	21

Second round
(France) M Lambert (France) C Pognante	18	19
8	(Japan) K Osawa (Japan) M Tanabe	21	21
(United States) L Lam (United States) A Lee	21	21
4	(Ukraine) P Buhrova (Ukraine) Y Kantemyr	18	17

Quarter-finals
8	(Japan) K Osawa (Japan) M Tanabe	16	21	21
(United States) L Lam (United States) A Lee	21	15	16

==== Section 4 ====
First round
(Brazil) J Lima (Brazil) S Lima	11	21	15
Q4	(Denmark) K Vang (Denmark) M Werge	21	10	21
(Chinese Taipei) Hung H-e (Chinese Taipei) Lee C-c	13	10
7	(Canada) J Dent (Canada) C Lai	21	21
(England) A Harris (England) L Tolman	21	21
Q3	(Canada) E Kwan (Canada) J Rymes	17	18
(England) A Lado (England) E van Leeuwen	9	15
2	(Chinese Taipei) Chang C-h (Chinese Taipei) Yang C-t	21	21

Second round
Q4	(Denmark) K Vang (Denmark) M Werge	15	21	23
7	(Canada) J Dent (Canada) C Lai	21	15	25
(England) A Harris (England) L Tolman	15	16
2	(Chinese Taipei) Chang C-h (Chinese Taipei) Yang C-t	21	21

Quarter-finals
7	(Canada) J Dent (Canada) C Lai	14	21	11
2	(Chinese Taipei) Chang C-h (Chinese Taipei) Yang C-t	21	16	21

== Mixed doubles ==
=== Seeds ===
1. (India) Dhruv Kapila / Tanisha Crasto (first round)
2. (Thailand) Ruttanapak Oupthong / Jhenicha Sudjaipraparat (champions)
3. (Chinese Taipei) Chen Cheng-kuan / Hsu Yin-hui (quarter-finals)
4. (England) Callum Hemming / Estelle van Leeuwen (semi-finals)
5. (Denmark) Rasmus Espersen / Amalie Cecilie Kudsk (first round)
6. (United States) Presley Smith / Jennie Gai (final)
7. (France) Julien Maio / Léa Palermo (first round)
8. (United States) Chen Zhi-yi / Francesca Corbett (second round)

=== Finals ===
Semi-finals
6	(United States) Presley Smith (United States) Jennie Gai	21	21
(Germany) Marvin Seidel (Germany) Thuc Phuong Nguyen	9	15
4	(England) Callum Hemming (England) Estelle van Leeuwen	15	16
2	(Thailand) Ruttanapak Oupthong (Thailand) Jhenicha Sudjaipraparat	21	21

Final
6	(United States) Presley Smith (United States) Jennie Gai	14	17
2	(Thailand) Ruttanapak Oupthong (Thailand) Jhenicha Sudjaipraparat	21	21

=== Top half ===
==== Section 1 ====
First round
1	(India) D Kapila (India) T Crasto	15	19
(Spain) R García (Spain) L Rodríguez	21	21
(Indonesia) G C W Wijaya (Indonesia) S Kani	12	18
(Denmark) K Kolding (Denmark) M Werge	21	21
6	(United States) P Smith (United States) J Gai	5	22	21
(Germany) J C Völker (Germany) S Küspert	21	20	11
(Netherlands) B Wassink (Netherlands) D Jille	23	21
(United States) A Mar (United States) C Ho	21	12

Second round
(Spain) R García (Spain) L Rodríguez	21	11	22
(Denmark) K Kolding (Denmark) M Werge	18	21	20
6	(United States) P Smith (United States) J Gai	21	19	21
(Netherlands) B Wassink (Netherlands) D Jille	18	21	16

Quarter-finals
(Spain) R García (Spain) L Rodríguez	14	13
6	(United States) P Smith (United States) J Gai	21	21

==== Section 2 ====
First round
3	(Chinese Taipei) Chen C-k (Chinese Taipei) Hsu Y-h	21	21
(Chinese Taipei) He Z-w (Chinese Taipei) Chen Y-f	13	16
(Chinese Taipei) Lin B-w (Chinese Taipei) Lee C-c	21	21
(Czech Republic) O Král (Czech Republic) T Švábíková	15	17
8	(United States) Chen Z-y (United States) F Corbett	21	21
Q2	(Canada) C Chau (Canada) E Kwan	14	10
(Canada) J Lai (Canada) C Lai	16	5
(Germany) M Seidel (Germany) T P Nguyen	21	21

Second round
3	(Chinese Taipei) Chen C-k (Chinese Taipei) Hsu Y-h	21	21
(Chinese Taipei) Lin B-w (Chinese Taipei) Lee C-c	12	18
8	(United States) Chen Z-y (United States) F Corbett	16	13
(Germany) M Seidel (Germany) T P Nguyen	21	21

Quarter-finals
3	(Chinese Taipei) Chen C-k (Chinese Taipei) Hsu Y-h	11	9
(Germany) M Seidel (Germany) T P Nguyen	21	21

=== Bottom half ===
==== Section 3 ====
First round
Q1	(Chinese Taipei) Tsai F-c (Chinese Taipei) Sung Y-h	21	16	21
(England) R Easton (England) L Tolman	19	21	11
(Canada) K Lee (Canada) J Wu	21	21
7	(France) J Maio (France) L Palermo	14	16
Q3	(Indonesia) Z J Sumanti (Canada) C Choi	21	9	21
(Brazil) F Farias (Brazil) J Lima	19	21	6
(Germany) M Bourakkadi (Germany) L Michalski	17	14
4	(England) C Hemming (England) E van Leeuwen	21	21

Second round
Q1	(Chinese Taipei) Tsai F-c (Chinese Taipei) Sung Y-h	17	19
(Canada) K Lee (Canada) J Wu	21	21
Q3	(Indonesia) Z J Sumanti (Canada) C Choi	21	10	10
4	(England) C Hemming (England) E van Leeuwen	14	21	21

Quarter-finals
(Canada) K Lee (Canada) J Wu	21	21	17
4	(England) C Hemming (England) E van Leeuwen	23	18	21

==== Section 4 ====
First round
(Brazil) D Silva (Brazil) S Lima	16	16
(Canada) T Lock (Canada) C Hoang	21	21
(Chinese Taipei) Wu G-x (Chinese Taipei) Lee C-h	21	21
5	(Denmark) R Espersen (Denmark) A C Kudsk	17	16
(France) G Deschamp (France) M Lambert	20	15
Q4	(Chinese Taipei) Chang K-c (Chinese Taipei) Lin J-y	22	21
(Chinese Taipei) Po L-w (Chinese Taipei) Chang C-h	10	21	11
2	(Thailand) R Oupthong (Thailand) J Sudjaipraparat	21	16	21

Second round
(Canada) T Lock (Canada) C Hoang	8	15
(Chinese Taipei) Wu G-x (Chinese Taipei) Lee C-h	21	21
Q4	(Chinese Taipei) Chang K-c (Chinese Taipei) Lin J-y	14	10
2	(Thailand) R Oupthong (Thailand) J Sudjaipraparat	21	21

Quarter-finals
(Chinese Taipei) Wu G-x (Chinese Taipei) Lee C-h	23	13	14
2	(Thailand) R Oupthong (Thailand) J Sudjaipraparat	21	21	21

Preceded by 2025 U.S. Open	BWF World Tour; 2025 BWF season	Succeeded by 2025 Japan Open
