= 2026 U.S. Open (badminton) =

Badminton championships

Tournament details
- Dates: 23–28 June
- Edition: 61st
- Level: Super 300
- Total prize money: US$250,000
- Venue: California State University
- Location: Fullerton, California, United States

Champions
- Men's singles: (Chinese Taipei) Su Li-yang
- Women's singles: (Denmark) Line Christophersen
- Men's doubles: (Japan) Hiroki Okamura (Japan) Kyohei Yamashita
- Women's doubles: (Japan) Sumire Nakade (Japan) Miyu Takahashi
- Mixed doubles: (Chinese Taipei) Liu Kuang-heng (Chinese Taipei) Hsu Yin-hui

The 2026 U.S. Open (officially known as the Yonex US Open 2026 for sponsorship reasons) was a badminton tournament which took place at California State University, in Fullerton, California, United States, from 23 to 28 June 2026 and has a total purse of $250,000.

== Tournament ==
The 2026 U.S. Open tournament was the seventeenth tournament of the 2026 BWF World Tour and also part of U.S. Open Badminton Championships which have been held since 1954 and is organized by the USA Badminton and sanctioned by the BWF.

=== Venue ===
The tournament was held at California State University in Fullerton, California, United States.

=== Point distribution ===
Below is the point distribution table for each phase of the tournament based on the BWF points system for the BWF World Tour Super 300 event.

Winner	Runner-up	3/4	5/8	9/16	17/32	33/64	65/128
7,000	5,950	4,900	3,850	2,750	1,670	660	320

=== Prize money ===
The total prize money for this tournament is US$250,000. The distribution of the prize money is in accordance with BWF regulations.

Event	Winner	Finalist	Semi-finals	Quarter-finals	Last 16
Singles	$18,750	$9,500	$3,625	$1,500	$875
Doubles	$19,750	$9,500	$3,500	$1,812.50	$937.50

== Men's singles ==
=== Seeds ===
1. (Chinese Taipei) Chou Tien-chen (second round)
2. (India) Lakshya Sen (withdrew)
3. (Canada) Brian Yang (quarter-finals)
4. (Japan) Yudai Okimoto (semi-finals)
5. (India) Srikanth Kidambi (final)
6. (Denmark) Magnus Johannesen (withdrew)
7. (Chinese Taipei) Wang Po-wei (first round)
8. (Chinese Taipei) Su Li-yang (champion)

=== Finals ===
Semi-finals
Q4	(India) Rounak Chouhan	17	19
8	(Chinese Taipei) Su Li-yang	21	21
5	(India) Srikanth Kidambi	22	15	21
4	(Japan) Yudai Okimoto	20	21	19

Final
8	(Chinese Taipei) Su Li-yang	21	16	21
5	(India) Srikanth Kidambi	15	21	9

=== Top half ===
==== Section 1 ====
First round
1	(Chinese Taipei) Chou T-c	21	21
(Chinese Taipei) Wang Y-k	19	18
Q4	(India) R Chouhan	23	21
(India) S Subramanian	21	16
PFQ	(Chinese Taipei) Ting Y-c	8	18
Q1	(Malaysia) Cheam J W	21	21
Q2	(Germany) M Kicklitz	11	17
(Israel) M Zilberman	21	21

Second round
1	(Chinese Taipei) Chou T-c	17	24
Q4	(India) R Chouhan	21	26
Q1	(Malaysia) Cheam J W	15	19
(Israel) M Zilberman	21	21

Quarter-finals
Q4	(India) R Chouhan	23	21
(Israel) M Zilberman	21	11

==== Section 2 ====
First round
3	(Canada) B Yang	17	21	21
Q3	(Denmark) W Bøgebjerg	21	17	9
(Japan) R Takei	21	7	21
(Croatia) A Dinata	15	21	14
8	(Chinese Taipei) Su L-y	21	21
(Brazil) J Matias	16	17
(South Korea) Yoo T-b	23	21
(Guatemala) K Cordón	21	19

Second round
3	(Canada) B Yang	21	21
(Japan) R Takei	19	17
8	(Chinese Taipei) Su L-y	15	21	22
(South Korea) Yoo T-b	21	9	20

Quarter-finals
3	(Canada) B Yang	19	8
8	(Chinese Taipei) Su L-y	21	21

=== Bottom half ===
==== Section 3 ====
First round
(Finland) J Oldorff	21	17
(Finland) K Koljonen	18	12^{r}
(Chinese Taipei) Liao J-f	21	14	21
SWM	(Japan) M Koga	19	21	14
(Malaysia) Lee Z J	21	21
(Vietnam) Nguyễn H D	15	17
(India) S Dayanand	14	12
5	(India) S Kidambi	21	21

Second round
(Finland) J Oldorff	15	24	10
(Chinese Taipei) Liao J-f	21	22	21
(Malaysia) Lee Z J	14	13
5	(India) S Kidambi	21	21

Quarter-finals
(Chinese Taipei) Liao J-f	9	21	8
5	(India) S Kidambi	21	12	21

==== Section 4 ====
First round
(Denmark) D J Holm	14	17
(England) H Huang	21	21
(Japan) S Ogawa	21	22
7	(Chinese Taipei) Wang P-w	15	20
PFQ	(United States) M S Alcala	21	21
(Chinese Taipei) Huang P-h	14	18
(Belgium) J Carraggi	15	19
4	(Japan) Y Okimoto	21	21

Second round
(England) H Huang	15	15
(Japan) S Ogawa	21	21
PFQ	(United States) M S Alcala	14	4
4	(Japan) Y Okimoto	21	21

Quarter-finals
(Japan) S Ogawa	14	20
4	(Japan) Y Okimoto	21	22

== Women's singles ==
=== Seeds ===
1. (Canada) Michelle Li (first round)
2. (Denmark) Line Christophersen (champion)
3. (Japan) Riko Gunji (quarter-finals)
4. (United States) Beiwen Zhang (first round)
5. (India) Tanvi Sharma (quarter-finals)
6. (India) Devika Sihag (semi-finals)
7. (Denmark) Amalie Schulz (first round)
8. (Chinese Taipei) Sung Shuo-yun (quarter-finals)

=== Finals ===
Semi-finals
(Canada) Rachel Chan	11	13
(Bulgaria) Kaloyana Nalbantova	21	21
6	(India) Devika Sihag	21	11	15
2	(Denmark) Line Christophersen	15	21	21

Final
(Bulgaria) Kaloyana Nalbantova	16	21	11
2	(Denmark) Line Christophersen	21	16	21

=== Top half ===
==== Section 1 ====
First round
1	(Canada) M Li	21	15	19
(Chinese Taipei) Chen S-y	16	21	21
(India) R Ramraj	21	21
Q4	(Czech Republic) T Švábíková	15	8
7	(Denmark) A Schulz	13	21	15
Q1	(France) A Tatranova	21	18	21
(Canada) R Chan	21	21
(India) S Valishetty	19	11

Second round
(Chinese Taipei) Chen S-y	4	19
(India) R Ramraj	21	21
Q1	(France) A Tatranova	21	8	9
(Canada) R Chan	16	21	21

Quarter-finals
(India) R Ramraj	21	16	12
(Canada) R Chan	15	21	21

==== Section 2 ====
First round
4	(United States) B Zhang	17	21	17
(United States) E Lin	21	14	21
(India) A Kharb	15	15
(Bulgaria) K Nalbantova	21	21
8	(Chinese Taipei) Sung S-y	21	19	21
(Brazil) J V Vieira	17	21	11
(United States) I Jaiswal	15	21	10
(Chinese Taipei) Peng Y-w	21	12	21

Second round
(United States) E Lin	21	16	15
(Bulgaria) K Nalbantova	16	21	21
8	(Chinese Taipei) Sung S-y	21	13	21
(Chinese Taipei) Peng Y-w	18	21	18

Quarter-finals
(Bulgaria) K Nalbantova	21	21
8	(Chinese Taipei) Sung S-y	15	11

=== Bottom half ===
==== Section 3 ====
First round
(Thailand) Tonr Saeheng	21	21
Q2	(Hungary) V Sándorházi	14	11
(Peru) I Castillo	14	14
6	(India) D Sihag	21	21
(Canada) WY Zhang	18	19
(Chinese Taipei) Huang C-p	21	21
(India) T Hemanth	11	13
3	(Japan) R Gunji	21	21

Second round
(Thailand) Tonr Saeheng	17	19
6	(India) D Sihag	21	21
(Chinese Taipei) Huang C-p	22	14	10
3	(Japan) R Gunji	20	21	21

Quarter-finals
6	(India) D Sihag	22	21
3	(Japan) R Gunji	20	19

==== Section 4 ====
First round
(Chinese Taipei) Tung C-t	21	21
(India) A Kashyap	9	17
(Germany) Y Li	21	16
5	(India) T Sharma	23	21
Q3	(Denmark) A S Ryberg	17	9
(Ukraine) P Buhrova	21	21
(South Korea) Kim M-j	24	16
2	(Denmark) L Christophersen	26	21

Second round
(Chinese Taipei) Tung C-t	12	19
5	(India) T Sharma	21	21
(Ukraine) P Buhrova	14	21	26
2	(Denmark) L Christophersen	21	16	28

Quarter-finals
5	(India) T Sharma	16	21	11
2	(Denmark) L Christophersen	21	11	21

== Men's doubles ==
=== Seeds ===
1. (England) Ben Lane / Sean Vendy (semi-finals)
2. (United States) Chen Zhi-yi / Presley Smith (second round)
3. (Chinese Taipei) He Zhi-wei / Huang Jui-hsuan (first round)
4. (Chinese Taipei) Chen Zhi-ray / Lin Yu-chieh (final)
5. (Scotland) Christopher Grimley / Matthew Grimley (second round)
6. (Canada) Kevin Lee / Ty Alexander Lindeman (first round)
7. (Czech Republic) Jiří Král / Ondřej Král (second round)
8. (France) Éloi Adam / Léo Rossi (second round)

=== Finals ===
Semi-finals
1	(England) Ben Lane (England) Sean Vendy	21	18	16
(Japan) Hiroki Okamura (Japan) Kyohei Yamashita	10	21	21
4	(Chinese Taipei) Chen Zhi-ray (Chinese Taipei) Lin Yu-chieh	21	21
(Denmark) Christian Faust Kjær (Denmark) Rasmus Kjær	18	14

Final
(Japan) Hiroki Okamura (Japan) Kyohei Yamashita	21	16	21
4	(Chinese Taipei) Chen Zhi-ray (Chinese Taipei) Lin Yu-chieh	18	21	16

=== Top half ===
==== Section 1 ====
First round
1	(England) B Lane (England) S Vendy	21	21
Q3	(Sweden) L Axelsson (Sweden) F Karlborg	16	13
(Brazil) F Farias (Brazil) D Silva	15	15
(England) O Butler (England) S Jones	21	21
6	(Canada) K Lee (Canada) T A Lindeman	21	19	16
(Germany) B Geiss (Germany) J R Jansen	17	21	21
(Japan) K Matsui (Japan) K Mitsuhashi	22	21
(Chinese Taipei) Chang K-c (Chinese Taipei) Chen S-f	20	18

Second round
1	(England) B Lane (England) S Vendy	21	21
(England) O Butler (England) S Jones	14	13
(Germany) B Geiss (Germany) J R Jansen	21	6	19
(Japan) K Matsui (Japan) K Mitsuhashi	13	21	21

Quarter-finals
1	(England) B Lane (England) S Vendy	16	21	21
(Japan) K Matsui (Japan) K Mitsuhashi	21	16	15

==== Section 2 ====
First round
3	(Chinese Taipei) He Z-w (Chinese Taipei) Huang J-h	12	20
(Chinese Taipei) Chou Y-h (Chinese Taipei) Wu H-y	21	22
(Japan) H Okamura (Japan) K Yamashita	21	21
(England) A Green (England) Z Russ	17	16
8	(France) É Adam (France) L Rossi	21	21
(France) J Maio (France) W Villeger	19	18
(Japan) H Kawabe (Japan) K Matsukawa	22	21
Q1	(Chinese Taipei) Chen C-k (Chinese Taipei) Liu K-h	20	16

Second round
(Chinese Taipei) Chou Y-h (Chinese Taipei) Wu H-y	18	13
(Japan) H Okamura (Japan) K Yamashita	21	21
8	(France) É Adam (France) L Rossi	15	18
(Japan) H Kawabe (Japan) K Matsukawa	21	21

Quarter-finals
(Japan) H Okamura (Japan) K Yamashita	21	21
(Japan) H Kawabe (Japan) K Matsukawa	10	18

=== Bottom half ===
==== Section 3 ====
First round
Q4	(Japan) T Goto (Japan) T Yoshida	19	21	21
(Chinese Taipei) Chiu S-h (Chinese Taipei) Lin B-w	21	13	16
(United States) A Liu (United States) T Zhang	13	25	13
7	(Czech Republic) J Král (Czech Republic) O Král	21	23	21
(Chinese Taipei) Lin C-y (Chinese Taipei) Lin Y-s	21	21
Q2	(Canada) K M Deraj (Canada) K Nichols	6	16
(Malaysia) M R A Latif (Indonesia) T S C Hutomo	14	15
4	(Chinese Taipei) Chen Z-r (Chinese Taipei) Lin Y-c	21	21

Second round
Q4	(Japan) T Goto (Japan) T Yoshida	22	20	21
7	(Czech Republic) J Král (Czech Republic) O Král	20	22	12
(Chinese Taipei) Lin C-y (Chinese Taipei) Lin Y-s	11	12
4	(Chinese Taipei) Chen Z-r (Chinese Taipei) Lin Y-c	21	21

Quarter-finals
Q4	(Japan) T Goto (Japan) T Yoshida	15	17
4	(Chinese Taipei) Chen Z-r (Chinese Taipei) Lin Y-c	21	21

==== Section 4 ====
First round
(United States) A Q Lee (United States) S Xing	8	17
(Denmark) C F Kjær (Denmark) R Kjær	21	21
(Canada) J Lai (Canada) J Mak	5	6
5	(Scotland) C Grimley (Scotland) M Grimley	21	21
(Japan) S Mezaki (Japan) Y Oku	21	15	22
(Chinese Taipei) Lai P-y (Chinese Taipei) Tsai F-c	11	21	24
(Canada) D Leung (Canada) N Yakura	14	21	11
2	(United States) Chen Z-y (United States) P Smith	21	17	21

Second round
(Denmark) C F Kjær (Denmark) R Kjær	21	21
5	(Scotland) C Grimley (Scotland) M Grimley	14	7
(Chinese Taipei) Lai P-y (Chinese Taipei) Tsai F-c	21	21
2	(United States) Chen Z-y (United States) P Smith	19	10

Quarter-finals
(Denmark) C F Kjær (Denmark) R Kjær	21	21
(Chinese Taipei) Lai P-y (Chinese Taipei) Tsai F-c	19	15

== Women's doubles ==
=== Seeds ===
1. (Chinese Taipei) Hsu Yin-hui / Lin Jhih-yun (quarter-finals)
2. (Japan) Kaho Osawa / Mai Tanabe (semi-finals)
3. (United States) Lauren Lam / Allison Lee (quarter-finals)
4. (Japan) Hinata Suzuki / Nao Yamakita (semi-finals)
5. (Japan) Ririna Hiramoto / Kokona Ishikawa (first round)
6. (United States) Francesca Corbett / Jennie Gai (second round)
7. (Ukraine) Polina Buhrova / Yevheniia Kantemyr (quarter-finals)
8. (Chinese Taipei) Lin Chih-chun / Yang Chu-yun (final)

=== Finals ===
Semi-finals
(Japan) Sumire Nakade (Japan) Miyu Takahashi	21	21
4	(Japan) Hinata Suzuki (Japan) Nao Yamakita	18	18
8	(Chinese Taipei) Lin Chih-chun (Chinese Taipei) Yang Chu-yun	21	21
2	(Japan) Kaho Osawa (Japan) Mai Tanabe	14	12

Final
(Japan) Sumire Nakade (Japan) Miyu Takahashi	21	21
8	(Chinese Taipei) Lin Chih-chun (Chinese Taipei) Yang Chu-yun	16	10

=== Top half ===
==== Section 1 ====
First round
1	(Chinese Taipei) Hsu Y-h (Chinese Taipei) Lin J-y	21	21
(Canada) S Huang (Canada) E Zhang	18	12
Q3	(United States) Z Tan (United States) C Yeh	22	11	14
(England) S Kelly (England) L Tolman	20	21	21
5	(Japan) R Hiramoto (Japan) K Ishikawa	6	21	17
(Japan) S Nakade (Japan) M Takahashi	21	10	21
(India) T Jolly (India) G Gopichand	21	14	21
(Spain) P Lopéz (Spain) L Rodríguez	12	21	13

Second round
1	(Chinese Taipei) Hsu Y-h (Chinese Taipei) Lin J-y	21	21
(England) S Kelly (England) L Tolman	11	13
(Japan) S Nakade (Japan) M Takahashi	21	21
(India) T Jolly (India) G Gopichand	19	8

Quarter-finals
1	(Chinese Taipei) Hsu Y-h (Chinese Taipei) Lin J-y	20	19
(Japan) S Nakade (Japan) M Takahashi	22	21

==== Section 2 ====
First round
4	(Japan) H Suzuki (Japan) N Yamakita	21	21
(Australia) G Somerville (Canada) J Wu	9	18
(England) A Harris (England) E van Leeuwen	21	14	18
(Denmark) A C Kudsk (Denmark) S Pilgaard	19	21	21
6	(United States) F Corbett (United States) J Gai	21	21
Q1	(Germany) Y Li (Sweden) T Sjöö	8	12
(Japan) S Hirota (Japan) A Sakuramoto	21	21
(Brazil) J Lima (Brazil) Sâm Lima	19	8

Second round
4	(Japan) H Suzuki (Japan) N Yamakita	21	21
(Denmark) A C Kudsk (Denmark) S Pilgaard	17	15
6	(United States) F Corbett (United States) J Gai	22	22	16
(Japan) S Hirota (Japan) A Sakuramoto	24	20	21

Quarter-finals
4	(Japan) H Suzuki (Japan) N Yamakita	21	3
(Japan) S Hirota (Japan) A Sakuramoto	18	2^{r}

=== Bottom half ===
==== Section 3 ====
First round
(Chinese Taipei) Hsieh M-y (Chinese Taipei) Yu C-h	15	24	21
(Denmark) K Vang (Denmark) M Werge	21	22	12
(Japan) M Hatasue (Japan) K Muroya	12	17
8	(Chinese Taipei) Lin C-c (Chinese Taipei) Yang C-y	21	21
Q2	(United States) M Nishant (United States) S Wei	16	19
Q4	(United States) C Ho (United States) S Pan	21	21
(Indonesia) P R Damayanti (Indonesia) S Kani	8	14
3	(United States) L Lam (United States) A Lee	21	21

Second round
(Chinese Taipei) Hsieh M-y (Chinese Taipei) Yu C-h	14	21	19
8	(Chinese Taipei) Lin C-c (Chinese Taipei) Yang C-y	21	16	21
Q4	(United States) C Ho (United States) S Pan	7	9
3	(United States) L Lam (United States) A Lee	21	21

Quarter-finals
8	(Chinese Taipei) Lin C-c (Chinese Taipei) Yang C-y	21	18	21
3	(United States) L Lam (United States) A Lee	19	21	15

==== Section 4 ====
First round
(Canada) C Choi (United States) T Mertosono	22	22
(United States) S Li (United States) K Ngo	20	20
(Japan) N Hara (Japan) R Kiyose	15	21	14
7	(Ukraine) P Buhrova (Ukraine) Y Kantemyr	21	11	21
(Canada) J Dent (Canada) C Lai	21	17	17
(Japan) Y Kato (Japan) S Yonemoto	16	21	21
(United States) A Chang (United States) J Yeung	21	14	15
2	(Japan) K Osawa (Japan) M Tanabe	17	21	21

Second round
(Canada) C Choi (United States) T Mertosono	20	19
7	(Ukraine) P Buhrova (Ukraine) Y Kantemyr	22	21
(Japan) Y Kato (Japan) S Yonemoto	17	14
2	(Japan) K Osawa (Japan) M Tanabe	21	21

Quarter-finals
7	(Ukraine) P Buhrova (Ukraine) Y Kantemyr	21	17	4
2	(Japan) K Osawa (Japan) M Tanabe	16	21	21

== Mixed doubles ==
=== Seeds ===
1. (United States) Presley Smith / Jennie Gai (semi-finals)
2. (England) Callum Hemming / Estelle van Leeuwen (semi-finals)
3. (France) Julien Maio / Léa Palermo (second round)
4. (Japan) Akira Koga / Natsu Saito (second round)
5. (Spain) Rubén García / Lucía Rodríguez (first round)
6. (United States) Chen Zhi-yi / Francesca Corbett (first round)
7. (India) Dhruv Rawat / K. Maneesha (second round)
8. (Canada) Kevin Lee / Eliana Zhang (first round)

=== Finals ===
Semi-finals
1	(United States) Presley Smith (United States) Jennie Gai	12	18
(Chinese Taipei) Liu Kuang-heng (Chinese Taipei) Hsu Yin-hui	21	21
(Chinese Taipei) Wu Hsuan-yi (Chinese Taipei) Yang Chu-yun	21	21
2	(England) Callum Hemming (England) Estelle van Leeuwen	19	14

Final
(Chinese Taipei) Liu Kuang-heng (Chinese Taipei) Hsu Yin-hui	21	21
(Chinese Taipei) Wu Hsuan-yi (Chinese Taipei) Yang Chu-yun	9	11

=== Top half ===
==== Section 1 ====
First round
1	(United States) P Smith (United States) J Gai	21	21
(Sweden) F Karlborg (Sweden) T Sjöö	16	13
(Canada) J Lai (Canada) C Lai	21	16	14
(England) O Butler (England) A Harris	12	21	21
6	(United States) Chen Z-y (United States) F Corbett	21	16	18
(Canada) T Lock (Canada) C Hoang	18	21	21
(England) S Jones (England) L Tolman	15	11
(Brazil) D Silva (Brazil) Sân Lima	21	21

Second round
1	(United States) P Smith (United States) J Gai	21	21
(England) O Butler (England) A Harris	17	17
(Canada) T Lock (Canada) C Hoang	21	9	21
(Brazil) D Silva (Brazil) Sân Lima	15	21	15

Quarter-finals
1	(United States) P Smith (United States) J Gai	21	21
(Canada) T Lock (Canada) C Hoang	13	12

==== Section 2 ====
First round
4	(Japan) A Koga (Japan) N Saito	21	21
(Brazil) F Farias (Brazil) J Lima	9	8
(Chinese Taipei) Liu K-h (Chinese Taipei) Hsu Y-h	21	21	21
(Mexico) L Montoya (Mexico) M Rodríguez	23	19	11
7	(India) D Rawat (India) K. Maneesha	21	21
(Indonesia) W I Adam (Indonesia) S Kani	15	16
(Denmark) K Kolding (Denmark) M Werge	21	21
Q1	(United States) J H Lai (United States) J Yeung	14	9

Second round
4	(Japan) A Koga (Japan) N Saito	11	22
(Chinese Taipei) Liu K-h (Chinese Taipei) Hsu Y-h	21	24
7	(India) D Rawat (India) K. Maneesha	24	23	15
(Denmark) K Kolding (Denmark) M Werge	22	25	21

Quarter-finals
(Chinese Taipei) Liu K-h (Chinese Taipei) Hsu Y-h	10	21	21
(Denmark) K Kolding (Denmark) M Werge	21	19	10

=== Bottom half ===
==== Section 3 ====
First round
(United States) A Liu (United States) C Lam	21	21
(Germany) C Devereux (Germany) D Töpffer	8	11
(Chinese Taipei) Lin B-w (Chinese Taipei) Lin J-y	21	21
8	(Canada) K Lee (Canada) E Zhang	18	15
Q3	(United States) T Zhang (United States) A Chang	12	9
(Chinese Taipei) Wu H-y (Chinese Taipei) Yang C-y	21	21
(Czech Republic) O Král (Czech Republic) T Švábíková	15	18
3	(France) J Maio (France) L Palermo	21	21

Second round
(United States) A Liu (United States) C Lam	17	16
(Chinese Taipei) Lin B-w (Chinese Taipei) Lin J-y	21	21
(Chinese Taipei) Wu H-y (Chinese Taipei) Yang C-y	13	21	21
3	(France) J Maio (France) L Palermo	21	19	6

Quarter-finals
(Chinese Taipei) Lin B-w (Chinese Taipei) Lin J-y	13	15
(Chinese Taipei) Wu H-y (Chinese Taipei) Yang C-y	21	21

==== Section 4 ====
First round
(Thailand) Tonk Saeheng (Thailand) Tonr Saeheng	14	14
(Indonesia) T S C Hutomo (United States) C Ho	21	21
(Guatemala) C Martínez (Guatemala) D Corleto	7	21	21
5	(Spain) R García (Spain) L Rodríguez	21	18	16
Q4	(Canada) D Leung (Canada) J Dent	21	22
(United States) L Wang (United States) K Ngo	14	20
Q2	(United States) Z Xu (United States) C Yeh	8	9
2	(England) C Hemming (England) E van Leeuwen	21	21

Second round
(Indonesia) T S C Hutomo (United States) C Ho	21	21
(Guatemala) C Martínez (Guatemala) D Corleto	10	4
Q4	(Canada) D Leung (Canada) J Dent	12	13
2	(England) C Hemming (England) E van Leeuwen	21	21

Quarter-finals
(Indonesia) T S C Hutomo (United States) C Ho	15	14
2	(England) C Hemming (England) E van Leeuwen	21	21

Preceded by 2026 Macau Open	BWF World Tour; 2026 BWF season	Succeeded by 2026 Canada Open
