= Kaho Osawa =

Japanese badminton player (born 2001)

- Osawa in 2021

Personal information
- Native name: 大澤 佳歩
- Born: 28 September 2001 (age 25) Asaka, Saitama, Japan
- Height: 1.62 m (5 ft 4 in)

Sport
- Country: Japan
- Sport: Badminton
- Handedness: Right
- Coached by: Tomoko Maruoka

Women's doubles
- Highest ranking: 16 (with Mai Tanabe, 19 May 2026)
- BWF profile
Medal record
Women's badminton
Representing Japan
World Junior Championships
Bronze medal – third place	2019 Kazan	Girls' doubles
Bronze medal – third place	2019 Kazan	Mixed team

Kaho Osawa (大澤 佳歩, Ōsawa Kaho; born 28 September 2001) is a Japanese badminton player who specializes in women's doubles. She is affiliated with the San-in Godo Bank badminton team. She was a bronze medalist at the 2019 World Junior Championships, winning medals in girls' doubles with Hinata Suzuki and in mixed team event. Osawa has won five BWF International Challenge/Series titles. Partnering with Mai Tanabe, she finished as runner-up at three Super 300 tournaments in 2025: the Canada Open, the Macau Open, and the Syed Modi International. She reached a career-high world ranking of No. 16.

== Career ==
=== 2019: Junior career ===
In 2019, Osawa represented Japan at the World Junior Championships in Kazan, Russia. Partnering with Hinata Suzuki, she won a bronze medal in the girls' doubles and contributed to Japan's bronze medal in the mixed team event. Later that year, the duo captured the India Junior International, a BWF Junior International Grand Prix tournament.

=== 2022–2023: First senior international title ===
Osawa contested her first senior finals in 2022, finishing as runner-up at the India International (I) with Miho Kayama and the Maldives International with Kaoru Sugiyama. She claimed her maiden senior international title at the 2023 Vietnam International, partnering with Asuka Sugiyama.

=== 2024–2025: Three Super 300 runners-up, world top 30 ===
In 2024, Osawa formed a women's doubles partnership with Mai Tanabe. The pair won four BWF International Challenge/Series titles between 2024 and early 2025: the 2024 Kazakhstan International, 2024 Réunion Open, 2024 Mauritius International, and the 2025 Mexican International.

On the 2025 BWF World Tour, Osawa and Tanabe were runners-up at three Super 300 tournaments: the Canada Open, the Macau Open, and the Syed Modi International. The pair also made their Super 750 debut at the Japan Open, where they were eliminated in the second round by the former world No. 1 pair of Baek Ha-na and Lee So-hee. Osawa reached a career-high ranking of world No. 27 on 2 December 2025.

=== 2026 ===
Osawa and Tanabe began the 2026 season by making their Super 1000 debut at the Malaysia Open. The pair reached the quarterfinals after defeating the third-seeded Korean duo, Kim Hye-jeong and Kong Hee-yong. The pair later advanced to the semifinals of the Thailand Masters and the U.S. Open. In July, they reached their fourth Super 300 final at the Canada Open, finishing as runners-up to compatriots Hinata Suzuki and Nao Yamakita.

In August 2026, Osawa and Tanabe qualified to compete in the World Championships in India. This marked the first time since the club's founding in 1993 that the San-in Godo Bank ("Gogin") Badminton Team was represented at the tournament.

== Achievements ==
=== World Junior Championships ===
Girls' doubles
Year	Venue	Partner	Opponent	Score	Result	Ref.
2019	Kazan Gymnastics Center; Kazan, Russia	(Japan) Hinata Suzuki	(China) Lin Fangling (China) Zhou Xinru	7–21, 21–16, 17–21	Bronze	

=== BWF World Tour (4 runners-up) ===
The BWF World Tour, which was announced on 19 March 2017 and implemented in 2018, is a series of elite badminton tournaments sanctioned by the Badminton World Federation (BWF). The BWF World Tours are divided into levels of World Tour Finals, Super 1000, Super 750, Super 500, Super 300 (part of the HSBC World Tour), and the BWF Tour Super 100.

Women's doubles
Year	Tournament	Level	Partner	Opponent	Score	Result	Ref.
2025	Canada Open	Super 300	(Japan) Mai Tanabe	(Thailand) Benyapa Aimsaard (Thailand) Nuntakarn Aimsaard	12–21, 18–21	(silver) Runner-up	
2025	Macau Open	Super 300	(Japan) Mai Tanabe	(Chinese Taipei) Hsieh Pei-shan (Chinese Taipei) Hung En-tzu	18–21, 12–21	(silver) Runner-up	
2025	Syed Modi International	Super 300	(Japan) Mai Tanabe	(India) Gayatri Gopichand (India) Treesa Jolly	21–17, 13–21, 15–21	(silver) Runner-up	
2026	Canada Open	Super 300	(Japan) Mai Tanabe	(Japan) Hinata Suzuki (Japan) Nao Yamakita	15–21, 16–21	(silver) Runner-up	

=== BWF International Challenge/Series (5 titles, 2 runners-up) ===
Women's doubles
Year	Tournament	Partner	Opponent	Score	Result	Ref.
2022 (I)	India International	(Japan) Miho Kayama	(Japan) Chisato Hoshi (Japan) Miyu Takahashi	18–21, 21–19, 16–21	(silver) Runner-up	
2022	Maldives International	(Japan) Kaoru Sugiyama	(Japan) Chisato Hoshi (Japan) Miyu Takahashi	16–21, 15–21	(silver) Runner-up	
2023	Vietnam International	(Japan) Asuka Sugiyama	(Japan) Tsukiko Yasaki (Japan) Sorano Yoshikawa	19–21, 21–18, 21–10	(gold) Winner	
2024	Kazakhstan International	(Japan) Mai Tanabe	(Ukraine) Polina Buhrova (Ukraine) Yevheniia Kantemyr	Walkover	(gold) Winner	
2024	Réunion Open	(Japan) Mai Tanabe	(Germany) Julia Meyer (Germany) Leona Michalski	21–8, 21–8	(gold) Winner	
2024	Mauritius International	(Japan) Mai Tanabe	(Japan) Hina Shiwa (Japan) Chisa Yamafuji	21–14, 21–17	(gold) Winner	
2025	Mexican International	(Japan) Mai Tanabe	(Japan) Mao Hatasue (Japan) Miku Sugiyama	15–11, 15–8	(gold) Winner	

BWF International Challenge tournament
BWF International Series tournament

=== BWF Junior International (1 title) ===
Girls' doubles
Year	Tournament	Partner	Opponent	Score	Result	Ref.
2019	India Junior International	(Japan) Hinata Suzuki	(Thailand) Pornpicha Choeikeewong (Thailand) Pornnicha Suwatnodom	13–21, 21–15, 21–14	(gold) Winner	

BWF Junior International Grand Prix tournament

== Performance timeline ==
Key

W	Won	F	Finalist	SF	Semi-finalist
QF	Quarter-finalist	#R	Rounds 4, 3, 2, 1	RR	Round-robin stage
Q#	Qualification round	A	Absent	w/d	Withdrew
G	Gold	S	Silver	B	Bronze
NH	Not held	N/A	Not applicable	DNQ	Did not qualify

=== National team ===
==== Junior level ====
Team events	2019	Ref
World Junior Championships	B	

=== Individual competitions ===
==== Junior level ====
Girls' doubles

Events	2019	Ref
World Junior Championships	B	

==== Senior level ====
Women's doubles

Events	2026	Ref
World Championships	2R	

Tournament	BWF World Tour			Best	Ref
Tournament	2024	2025	2026	Best	Ref
Malaysia Open	A		QF	QF ('26)	
Indonesia Masters	A		2R	2R ('26)	
Thailand Masters	A		SF	SF ('26)	
German Open	A		QF	QF ('26)	
All England Open	A		2R	2R ('26)	
Ruichang China Masters	A	1R	A	1R ('25)	
Thailand Open	A		1R	1R ('26)	
Malaysia Masters	A		1R	1R ('26)	
Singapore Open	A		1R	1R ('26)	
Indonesia Open	A		1R	1R ('26)	
Macau Open	A	F	A	F ('25)	
U.S. Open	A		SF	SF ('26)	
Canada Open	A	F	F	F ('25, '26)	
Japan Open	A	2R	1R	2R ('25)	
China Open	A		1R	1R ('26)	
China Masters	A	1R	1R	1R ('25, '26)	
Arctic Open	A	2R	A	2R ('25)	
Denmark Open	A	1R	A	1R ('25)	
French Open	A	1R	A	1R ('25)	
Japan Masters	2R	1R	A	2R ('24)	
Syed Modi International	A	F	A	F ('25)	
Year-end ranking	101	28		28	
Tournament	2024	2025	2026	Best	Ref

== Wins over top-10 ranked pairs ==
Wins over pairs who were ranked in the world's top 10 at the time the match was played.

#	Partner	Opponent	Rk	Tournament	Rd	Score	Rk	Ref.
1	(Japan) Mai Tanabe	(South Korea) Kim Hye-jeong (South Korea) Kong Hee-yong	3	2026 Malaysia Open	2R	23–21, 17–21, 21–19	28	

== Record against selected opponents ==
Record against year-end Finals finalists, World Championships semi-finalists, and Olympic quarter-finalists. Accurate as of 2 September 2026.

=== Mai Tanabe ===
Players	M	W	L	Diff.
(China) Chen Qingchen & Jia Yifan	1	0	1	–1
(India) Treesa Jolly & Gayatri Gopichand	1	0	1	–1
(Japan) Yuki Fukushima & Mayu Matsumoto	2	0	2	–2
(South Korea) Baek Ha-na & Lee So-hee	2	0	2	–2
(Thailand) Benyapa Aimsaard & Nuntakarn Aimsaard	2	0	2	–2
