= Mai Tanabe =

Japanese badminton player (born 2003)

Personal information
- Native name: 田部 真唯
- Born: 4 June 2003 (age 23) Shimane Prefecture, Japan
- Height: 1.70 m (5 ft 7 in)

Sport
- Country: Japan
- Sport: Badminton
- Handedness: Right
- Coached by: Tomoko Maruoka

Women's doubles
- Highest ranking: 16 (with Kaho Osawa, 19 May 2026)
- Current ranking: 167 (with Mei Sudo, 17 November 2026)
- BWF profile

Mai Tanabe (田部 真唯, Tanabe Mai; born 4 June 2003) is a Japanese badminton player who competes in women's doubles. She is affiliated with the San-in Godo Bank badminton team. Partnering with Kaho Osawa, Tanabe was a runner-up at four Super 300 tournaments, the 2025 Canada Open, the 2025 Macau Open, the 2025 Syed Modi International, and the 2026 Canada Open. She has also won six titles on the BWF International Challenge/Series circuit.

== Career ==
Tanabe claimed her first international title in 2023 at the Mauritius International, partnering with Natsumi Takasaki. The pair were also runners-up at the Réunion Open later that year.

She formed a new partnership with Kaho Osawa in 2024, and together they won three BWF International Challenge/Series titles: the Kazakhstan International, the Réunion Open, and the Mauritius International.

Tanabe and Osawa secured their first title of the 2025 season at the Mexican International. On the BWF World Tour, they were runners-up at three Super 300 tournaments: the Canada Open, the Macau Open, and the Syed Modi International. The pair also made their Super 750 debut at the Japan Open, losing in the second round to Baek Ha-na and Lee So-hee.

Tanabe and Osawa opened the 2026 season at the Malaysia Open, their Super 1000 debut, reaching the quarterfinals after defeating third seeds Kim Hye-jeong and Kong Hee-yong. They later advanced to the semifinals of the Thailand Masters and the U.S. Open. In July, they reached their fourth Super 300 final at the Canada Open, finishing as runners-up to compatriots Hinata Suzuki and Nao Yamakita.

In August 2026, Tanabe and Osawa competed at the World Championships in India. Their participation marked the first appearance by the San-in Godo Bank badminton team at the tournament since the club’s founding in 1993, and Tanabe became the first player from Shimane Prefecture to compete in the event. Later that year, partnering with Mei Sudo, the 2023 Asian junior champion, she won back-to-back titles at the India International in Bengaluru and Hyderabad in November.

== Achievements ==
=== BWF World Tour (4 runners-up) ===
The BWF World Tour, which was announced on 19 March 2017 and implemented in 2018, is a series of elite badminton tournaments sanctioned by the Badminton World Federation (BWF). The BWF World Tours are divided into levels of World Tour Finals, Super 1000, Super 750, Super 500, Super 300 (part of the HSBC World Tour), and the BWF Tour Super 100.

Women's doubles
Year	Tournament	Level	Partner	Opponent	Score	Result	Ref.
2025	Canada Open	Super 300	(Japan) Kaho Osawa	(Thailand) Benyapa Aimsaard (Thailand) Nuntakarn Aimsaard	12–21, 18–21	(silver) Runner-up	
2025	Macau Open	Super 300	(Japan) Kaho Osawa	(Chinese Taipei) Hsieh Pei-shan (Chinese Taipei) Hung En-tzu	18–21, 12–21	(silver) Runner-up	
2025	Syed Modi International	Super 300	(Japan) Kaho Osawa	(India) Gayatri Gopichand (India) Treesa Jolly	21–17, 13–21, 15–21	(silver) Runner-up	
2026	Canada Open	Super 300	(Japan) Kaho Osawa	(Japan) Hinata Suzuki (Japan) Nao Yamakita	15–21, 16–21	(silver) Runner-up	

=== BWF International Challenge/Series (7 titles, 1 runner-up) ===
Women's doubles
Year	Tournament	Partner	Opponent	Score	Result	Ref.
2023	Mauritius International	(Japan) Natsumi Takasaki	(United States) Srivedya Gurazada (United States) Ishika Jaiswal	21–4, 21–14	(gold) Winner	
2023	Réunion Open	(Japan) Natsumi Takasaki	(France) Margot Lambert (France) Anne Tran	21–14, 14–21, 10–21	(silver) Runner-up	
2024	Kazakhstan International	(Japan) Kaho Osawa	(Ukraine) Polina Buhrova (Ukraine) Yevheniia Kantemyr	Walkover	(gold) Winner	
2024	Réunion Open	(Japan) Kaho Osawa	(Germany) Julia Meyer (Germany) Leona Michalski	21–8, 21–8	(gold) Winner	
2024	Mauritius International	(Japan) Kaho Osawa	(Japan) Hina Shiwa (Japan) Chisa Yamafuji	21–14, 21–17	(gold) Winner	
2025	Mexican International	(Japan) Kaho Osawa	(Japan) Mao Hatasue (Japan) Miku Sugiyama	15–11, 15–8	(gold) Winner	
2026 (I)	India International	(Japan) Mei Sudo	(India) Ashwini Bhat (India) Shikha Gautam	21–13, 13–21, 21–19	(gold) Winner	
2026 (II)	India International	(Japan) Mei Sudo	(Thailand) Phattharin Aiamvareesrisakul (Thailand) Sarisa Janpeng	21–11, 21–11	(gold) Winner	

BWF International Challenge tournament
BWF International Series tournament

== Performance timeline ==
Key

W	Won	F	Finalist	SF	Semi-finalist
QF	Quarter-finalist	#R	Rounds 4, 3, 2, 1	RR	Round-robin stage
Q#	Qualification round	A	Absent	w/d	Withdrew
G	Gold	S	Silver	B	Bronze
NH	Not held	N/A	Not applicable	DNQ	Did not qualify

=== Individual competitions ===
==== Senior level ====
Women's doubles

Events	2026	Ref
World Championships	2R	

Tournament	BWF World Tour			Best	Ref
Tournament	2024	2025	2026	Best	Ref
Malaysia Open	A		QF	QF ('26)	
Indonesia Masters	A		2R	2R ('26)	
Thailand Masters	A		SF	SF ('26)	
German Open	A		QF	QF ('26)	
All England Open	A		2R	2R ('26)	
Ruichang China Masters	A	1R	A	1R ('25)	
Thailand Open	A		1R	1R ('26)	
Malaysia Masters	A		1R	1R ('26)	
Singapore Open	A		1R	1R ('26)	
Indonesia Open	A		1R	1R ('26)	
Macau Open	A	F	A	F ('25)	
U.S. Open	A		SF	SF ('26)	
Canada Open	A	F	F	F ('25, '26)	
Japan Open	A	2R	1R	2R ('25)	
China Open	A		1R	1R ('26)	
China Masters	A	1R	1R	1R ('25, '26)	
Arctic Open	A	2R	A	2R ('25)	
Denmark Open	A	1R	A	1R ('25)	
French Open	A	1R	A	1R ('25)	
Japan Masters	2R	1R	A	2R ('24)	
Syed Modi International	A	F	A	F ('25)	
Year-end ranking	101	28		28	
Tournament	2024	2025	2026	Best	Ref

== Wins over top-10 ranked pairs ==
Wins over pairs who were ranked in the world's top 10 at the time the match was played.

#	Partner	Opponent	Rk	Tournament	Rd	Score	Rk	Ref.
1	(Japan) Kaho Osawa	(South Korea) Kim Hye-jeong (South Korea) Kong Hee-yong	3	2026 Malaysia Open	2R	23–21, 17–21, 21–19	28	

== Record against selected opponents ==
Record against year-end Finals finalists, World Championships semi-finalists, and Olympic quarter-finalists. Accurate as of 2 September 2026.

=== Kaho Osawa ===
Players	M	W	L	Diff.
(China) Chen Qingchen & Jia Yifan	1	0	1	–1
(India) Treesa Jolly & Gayatri Gopichand	1	0	1	–1
(Japan) Yuki Fukushima & Mayu Matsumoto	2	0	2	–2
(South Korea) Baek Ha-na & Lee So-hee	2	0	2	–2
(Thailand) Benyapa Aimsaard & Nuntakarn Aimsaard	2	0	2	–2
