= Su Li-yang =

Taiwanese badminton player (born 2001)

Su Li-yang 蘇力揚
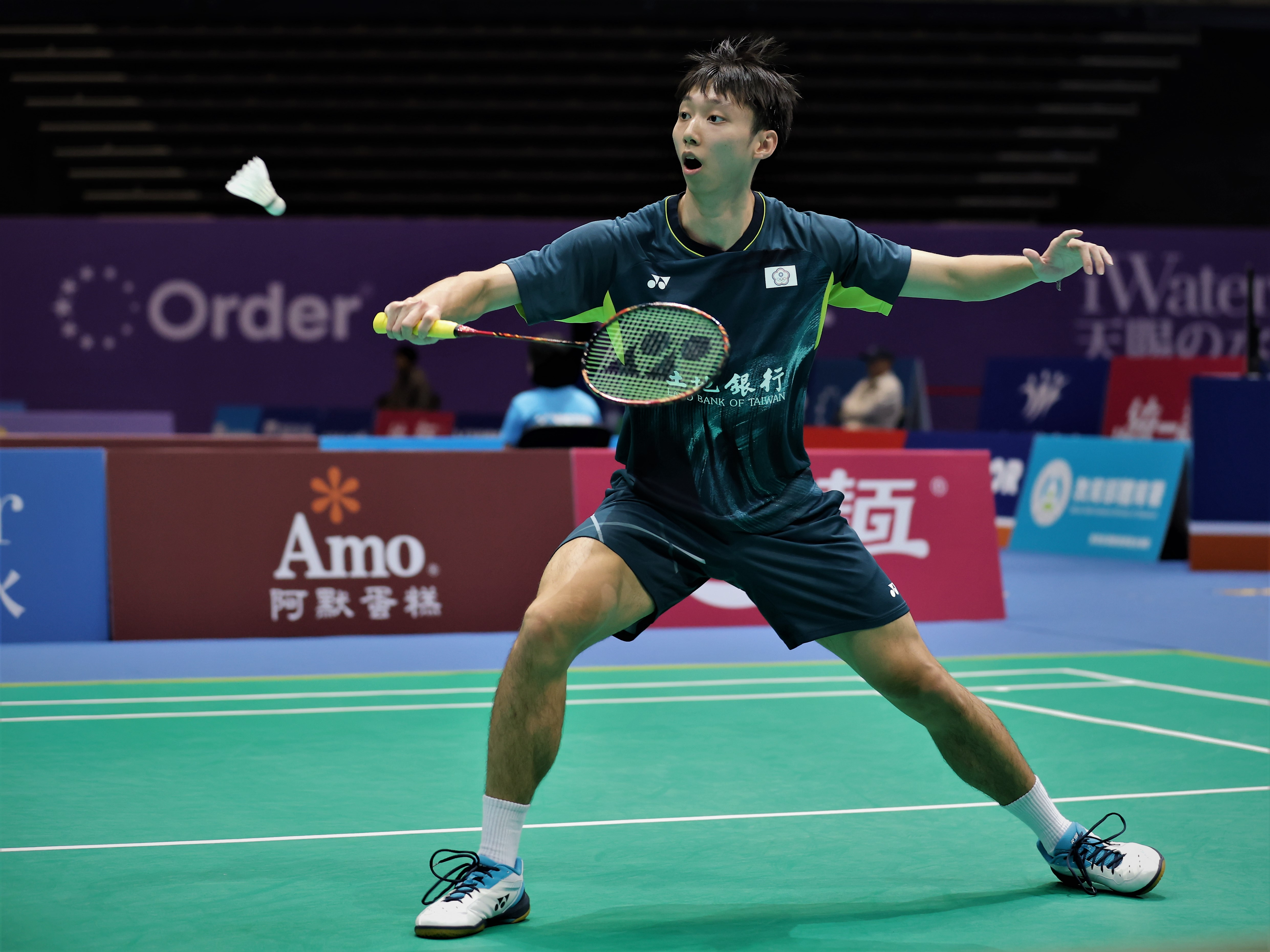
- Su at the 2024 Kaohsiung Masters

Personal information
- Born: 27 December 2001 (age 24)
- Height: 1.82 m (6 ft 0 in)

Sport
- Country: Republic of China (Taiwan)
- Sport: Badminton
- Handedness: Right

Men's singles
- Highest ranking: 29 (21 May 2024)
- Current ranking: 41 (10 November 2026)
- BWF profile
Medal record
Men's badminton
Representing Chinese Taipei
World University Games
| Silver medal – second place | 2025 Rhine-Ruhr | Mixed team |
Asian Junior Championships
| Bronze medal – third place | 2019 Suzhou | Boys' singles |

Su Li-yang (Chinese: 蘇力揚; pinyin: Sū Lìyáng; born 27 December 2001) is a Taiwanese badminton player.

== Career ==
Su Li-yang's father Su Chih-ming was also a badminton player. Su Li-yang started to playing badminton when he was in the first grade of elementary school. Educated at the Datong High School, he had shown his potential as an excellent badminton player at several national and international tournaments. He also later studied at the University of Taipei. In 2017, at the age of 16, he reached the semi-finals of the senior international tournament Sydney International. He won his first international title at the 2018 Italian Junior International. In 2019, he won the Mongolia Junior international, and later settled for the bronze medal at the Asian Junior Championships. In 2022, he reached the finals of the Bonn International, Mongolia International and Bendigo International.

== Achievements ==
=== Asian Junior Championships ===
Boys' singles
| Year | Venue | Opponent | Score | Result | Ref. |
|---|---|---|---|---|---|
| 2019 | Suzhou Olympic Sports Centre; Suzhou, China | (China) Liu Liang | 9–21, 17–21 | Bronze | |

=== BWF World Tour (1 title, 1 runner-up) ===
The BWF World Tour, which was announced on 19 March 2017 and implemented in 2018, is a series of elite badminton tournaments sanctioned by the Badminton World Federation (BWF). The BWF World Tour is divided into levels of World Tour Finals, Super 1000, Super 750, Super 500, Super 300, and the BWF Tour Super 100.

Men's singles
| Year | Tournament | Level | Opponent | Score | Result | Ref. |
|---|---|---|---|---|---|---|
| 2023 | Taipei Open | Super 300 | (Indonesia) Chico Aura Dwi Wardoyo | 21–23, 15–21 | (silver) Runner-up | |
| 2026 | U.S. Open | Super 300 | (India) Srikanth Kidambi | 21–15, 16–21, 21–9 | (gold) Winner | |

=== BWF International Challenge/Series (1 title, 4 runners-up) ===
Men's singles
| Year | Tournament | Opponent | Score | Result | Ref. |
|---|---|---|---|---|---|
| 2022 | Bonn International | (Malaysia) Justin Hoh | 19–21, 17–21 | (silver) Runner-up | |
| 2022 | Mongolia International | (Chinese Taipei) Lin Chun-yi | 16–21, 14–21 | (silver) Runner-up | |
| 2022 | Bendigo International | (Chinese Taipei) Lin Chun-yi | 19–21, 20–22 | (silver) Runner-up | |
| 2023 | Slovenia Open | (India) Sameer Verma | 18–21, 14–21 | (silver) Runner-up | |
| 2026 | Dutch Open | (Israel) Daniil Dubovenko | 21–17, 16–21, 21–17 | (gold) Winner | |

BWF International Challenge tournament
BWF International Series tournament
BWF Future Series tournament

=== BWF Junior International (2 titles, 3 runners-up) ===
Boys' singles
| Year | Tournament | Opponent | Score | Result | Ref. |
|---|---|---|---|---|---|
| 2017 | Australian Junior International | (Chinese Taipei) Lee Chia-hao | 16–21, 13–21 | (silver) Runner-up | |
| 2017 | French Junior International | (Chinese Taipei) Chen Shiau-cheng | 13–21, 10–21 | (silver) Runner-up | |
| 2017 | Slovak Junior International | (Chinese Taipei) Chen Shiau-cheng | 21–14, 16–21, 12–21 | (silver) Runner-up | |
| 2018 | Italian Junior International | (Chinese Taipei) Yu Sheng-po | 21–18, 21–17 | (gold) Winner | |
| 2019 | Mongolia Junior International | (Chinese Taipei) Yu Sheng-po | 21–16, 21–18 | (gold) Winner | |

BWF Junior International Grand Prix tournament
BWF Junior International Challenge tournament
BWF Junior International Series tournament
BWF Junior Future Series tournament
