= Yu Chien-hui =

Taiwanese badminton player (born 1995)

Yu Chien-hui 余芊慧
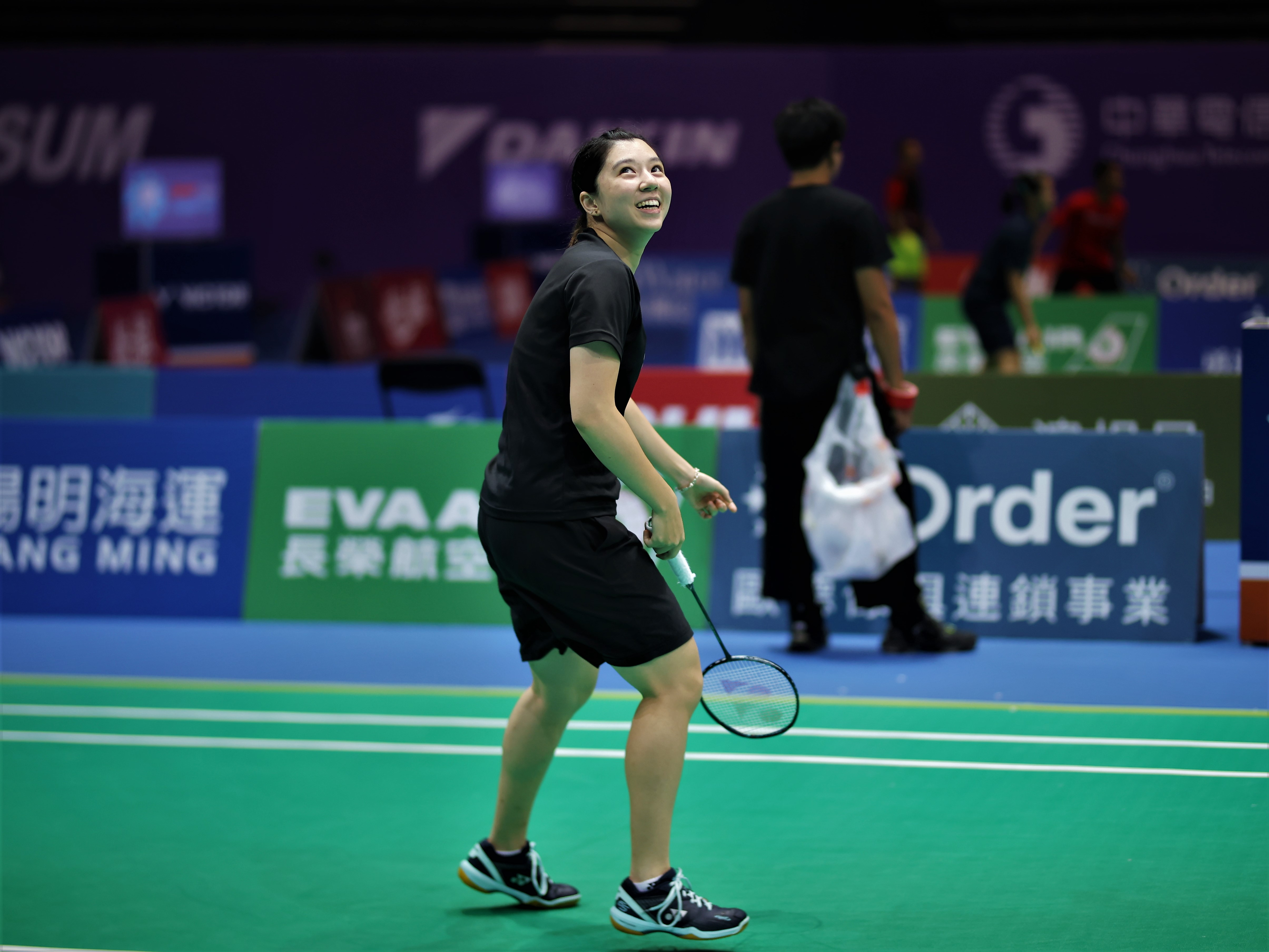
- Yu at the 2024 Kaohsiung Masters

Personal information
- Born: 8 May 1995 (age 31)

Sport
- Country: Republic of China (Taiwan)
- Sport: Badminton
- Handedness: Right

Women's singles & doubles
- Highest ranking: 91 (WS, 10 November 2016); 13 (WD with Sung Shuo-yun, 4 March 2025)
- Current ranking: 40 (WD with Sung Shuo-yun, 7 July 2026)
Medal record
Women's badminton
Representing Chinese Taipei
World Junior Championships
| Bronze medal – third place | 2011 Taipei | Mixed team |

Yu Chien-hui (Chinese: 余芊慧; pinyin: Yú Qiānhuì; born 8 May 1995) is a Taiwanese badminton player.

== Early life ==
Yu started playing badminton in her youth at the suggestion of her mother, who thought it would help her myopia. By the time her eyesight improved, she had come to love the sport, and she kept playing through her school years, competing in national events even before graduating from Datong High School. During her high school career, she was chosen for the national trials for Asian and World Youth teams. She also reached the quarterfinals of the Singapore International tournament during this period.

== Achievements ==
=== BWF World Tour (1 title, 2 runners-up) ===
The BWF World Tour, which was announced on 19 March 2017 and implemented in 2018, is a series of elite badminton tournaments sanctioned by the Badminton World Federation (BWF). The BWF World Tours are divided into levels of World Tour Finals, Super 1000, Super 750, Super 500, Super 300, and the BWF Tour Super 100.

Women's doubles
| Year | Tournament | Level | Partner | Opponent | Score | Result |
|---|---|---|---|---|---|---|
| 2023 | Guwahati Masters | Super 100 | (Chinese Taipei) Sung Shuo-yun | (India) Tanisha Crasto (India) Ashwini Ponnappa | 13–21, 19–21 | (silver) Runner-up |
| 2024 | Kaohsiung Masters | Super 100 | (Chinese Taipei) Sung Shuo-yun | (Indonesia) Jesita Putri Miantoro (Indonesia) Febi Setianingrum | 14–21, 18–21 | (silver) Runner-up |
| 2024 | Hylo Open | Super 300 | (Chinese Taipei) Sung Shuo-yun | (Ukraine) Polina Buhrova (Ukraine) Yevheniia Kantemyr | 21–16, 21–14 | (gold) Winner |

=== BWF International Challenge/Series (5 titles, 4 runners-up) ===
Women's doubles
| Year | Tournament | Partner | Opponent | Score | Result |
|---|---|---|---|---|---|
| 2017 | Polish Open | (Chinese Taipei) Chang Hsin-tien | (Indonesia) Yulfira Barkah (Indonesia) Meirisa Cindy Sahputri | 12–21, 21–14, 14–21 | (silver) Runner-up |
| 2018 | Sydney International | (Chinese Taipei) Peng Li-ting | (Chinese Taipei) Lee Chih-chen (Chinese Taipei) Liu Chiao-yun | 16–21, 21–23 | (silver) Runner-up |
| 2018 | Yonex / K&D Graphics International | (Chinese Taipei) Hung Shih-han | (Canada) Rachel Honderich (Canada) Kristen Tsai | 19–21, 15–21 | (silver) Runner-up |
| 2022 | Polish International | (Chinese Taipei) Sung Shuo-yun | (Japan) Miku Shigeta (Japan) Yui Suizu | 18–21, 18–21 | (silver) Runner-up |
| 2022 | Sydney International | (Chinese Taipei) Sung Shuo-yun | (Chinese Taipei) Chang Ching-hui (Chinese Taipei) Yang Ching-tun | 21–16, 21–11 | (gold) Winner |
| 2022 | North Harbour International | (Chinese Taipei) Sung Shuo-yun | (Australia) Chen Hsuan-yu (Australia) Gronya Somerville | 21–19, 21–17 | (gold) Winner |
| 2026 | Singapore International | (Chinese Taipei) Hsieh Mi-yen | (Australia) Laudya Chelsea Griselda (Australia) Nozomi Shimizu | 21–18, 19–21, 21–16 | (gold) Winner |
| 2026 | Malaysia International | (Chinese Taipei) Hsieh Mi-yen | (Thailand) Tidapron Kleebyeesun (Thailand) Nattamon Laisuan | 21–8, 21–14 | (gold) Winner |
| 2026 | North Harbour International | (Chinese Taipei) Hsieh Mi-yen | (Australia) Laudya Chelsea Griselda (Australia) Nozomi Shimizu | 17–21, 21–11, 21–16 | (gold) Winner |

BWF International Challenge tournament
BWF International Series tournament
BWF Future Series tournament
