= Polina Buhrova =

Ukrainian badminton player (born 2004)

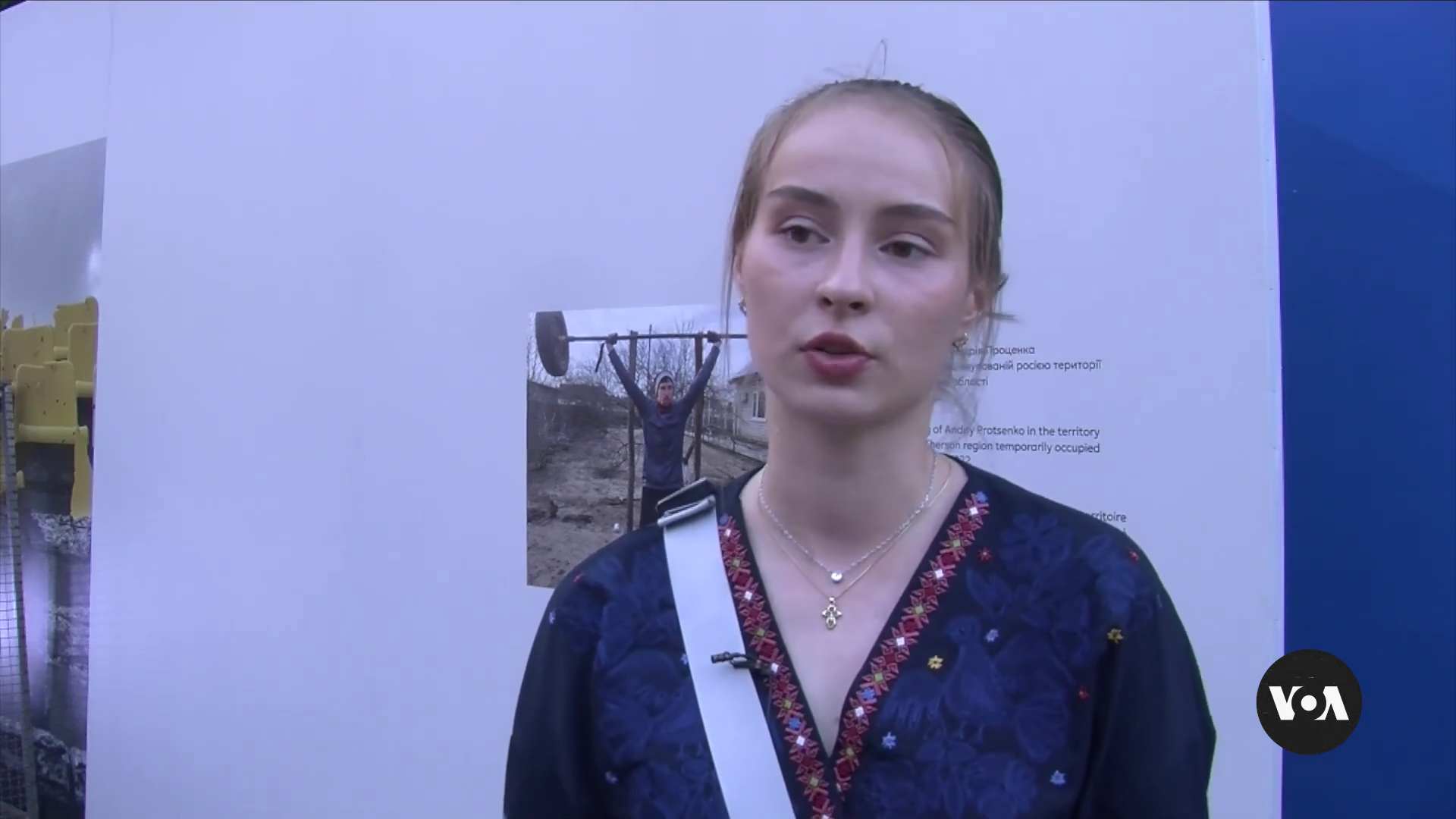
- Buhrova in 2024

Personal information
- Born: 30 January 2004 (age 22) Kharkiv, Ukraine
- Height: 1.71 m (5 ft 7 in)

Sport
- Country: Ukraine
- Sport: Badminton
- Handedness: Right

Women's singles & doubles
- Highest ranking: 35 (WS, 15 July 2025); 19 (WD with Yevheniia Kantemyr, 15 April 2025)
- Current ranking: 47 (WS); 30 (WD with Yevheniia Kantemyr) (10 November 2026)
- BWF profile
Medal record
Women's badminton
Representing Ukraine
European Championships
Bronze medal – third place	2026 Huelva	Women's doubles
European Women's Team Championships
Bronze medal – third place	2026 Istanbul	Women's team
European Junior Championships
Bronze medal – third place	2020 Lahti	Girls' doubles
Bronze medal – third place	2022 Belgrade	Mixed team

Polina Buhrova (Ukrainian: Поліна Бугрова; born 30 January 2004) is a badminton player from Ukraine and the 2021 and 2023 National Champion of Ukraine (both singles and women's doubles).

== Career ==
First major senior tournament for Buhrova was the 2021 European Badminton Championships in Kyiv. Together with Mariia Stoliarenko, she received a wild card for women's doubles. They won against Irish Kate Frost and Moya Ryan but lost to Danish Alexandra Bøje and Mette Poulsen in the second round.

Buhrova has won several medals at the European junior championships, including bronze in girls' doubles in 2020. Though she was seeded 4th for the 2022 World Junior Championships in the singles' tournament, she lost in the third round. The same happened during the 2022 European Junior Championships when she lost both in singles and doubles in the third round despite being top seeded.

Buhrova competed in the 2023 European Games. In Tarnów, she finished second in her group (after losing to Danish Line Kjærsfeldt and winning against Hristomira Popovska from Bulgaria), but lost to Neslihan Yiğit from Turkey in the round of 16. At the 2023 BWF World Championships in Copenhagen, Buhrova lost to Putri Kusuma Wardani from Indonesia in the first round. She also competed for Ukraine at the 2023 European Mixed Team Badminton Championships where she played just one game which she won (against English Abigail Holden).

Through Olympic ratings, Buhrova qualified for the 2024 Summer Olympics.

== Personal life ==
Buhrova studies at the Kharkiv Polytechnic Institute.

== Achievements ==
=== European Junior Championships ===
Girls' doubles
Year	Venue	Partner	Opponent	Score	Result
2020	Pajulahti Sports Institute; Lahti, Finland	(Ukraine) Mariia Stoliarenko	(Germany) Leona Michalski (Germany) Thuc Phuong Nguyen	20–22, 10–21	Bronze

=== European Championships ===
Women's doubles
Year	Venue	Partner	Opponent	Score	Result
2026	Palacio de los Deportes Carolina Marín; Huelva, Spain	(Ukraine) Yevheniia Kantemyr	(Bulgaria) Gabriela Stoeva (Bulgaria) Stefani Stoeva	12–21, 3–21	Bronze

=== BWF World Tour (1 runner-up) ===
The BWF World Tour, which was announced on 19 March 2017 and implemented in 2018, is a series of elite badminton tournaments sanctioned by the Badminton World Federation (BWF). The BWF World Tours are divided into levels of World Tour Finals, Super 1000, Super 750, Super 500, Super 300, and the BWF Tour Super 100.

Women's doubles
Year	Tournament	Level	Partner	Opponent	Score	Result
2024	Hylo Open	Super 300	(Ukraine) Yevheniia Kantemyr	(Chinese Taipei) Sung Shuo-yun (Chinese Taipei) Yu Chien-hui	16–21, 14–21	(silver) Runner-up

=== BWF International Challenge/Series (5 titles, 6 runners-up) ===
Women's singles
Year	Tournament	Opponent	Score	Result
2021	Latvia International	(Ukraine) Mariia Stoliarenko	21–13, 21–16	(gold) Winner
2021	Kharkiv International	(Switzerland) Dounia Pelupessy	21–17, 21–12	(gold) Winner
2021	Italian International	(Sweden) Edith Urell	21–18, 18–21, 18–21	(silver) Runner-up
2024	Bangladesh International	(Thailand) Lalinrat Chaiwan	21–19, 21–19	(gold) Winner
2025	Astana International	(Indonesia) Thalita Ramadhani Wiryawan	7–21, 14–21	(silver) Runner-up
2026	Polish Open	(India) Unnati Hooda	21–10, 15–21, 8–21	(silver) Runner-up

Women's doubles
Year	Tournament	Partner	Opponent	Score	Result
2024	Kazakhstan International	(Ukraine) Yevheniia Kantemyr	(Japan) Kaho Osawa (Japan) Mai Tanabe	walkover	(silver) Runner-up
2024	Mexican International	(Ukraine) Yevheniia Kantemyr	(Mexico) Romina Fregoso (Mexico) Miriam Rodríguez	21–12, 21–16	(gold) Winner
2024	Turkey International	(Ukraine) Yevheniia Kantemyr	(Spain) Paula López (Spain) Lucía Rodríguez	walkover	(silver) Runner-up
2024	Bangladesh International	(Ukraine) Yevheniia Kantemyr	(Thailand) Kodchaporn Chaichana (Thailand) Pannawee Polyiam	23–25, 21–18, 11–21	(silver) Runner-up
2025	Astana International	(Ukraine) Yevheniia Kantemyr	(Indonesia) Lanny Tria Mayasari (Indonesia) Amallia Cahaya Pratiwi	21–12, 11–21, 21–13	(gold) Winner

BWF International Challenge tournament
BWF International Series tournament
BWF Future Series tournament

=== BWF Junior International (3 titles, 2 runners-up) ===
Girls' singles
Year	Tournament	Opponent	Score	Result
2019	Ukraine Junior International	(Ukraine) Anastasiya Prozorova	17–21, 21–15, 21–17	(gold) Winner
2020	Polish Junior International	(Denmark) Anna Siess Ryberg	12–21, 24–26	(silver) Runner-up
2021	Ukraine Junior International	(Ukraine) Mariia Stoliarenko	21–13, 21–12	(gold) Winner

Girls' doubles
Year	Tournament	Partner	Opponent	Score	Result
2020	Polish Junior International	(Ukraine) Mariia Stoliarenko	(Denmark) Simona Pilgaard (Denmark) Anna Siess Ryberg	13–21, 14–21	(silver) Runner-up
2021	Ukraine Junior International	(Ukraine) Mariia Stoliarenko	(Ukraine) Polina Tkach (Ukraine) Olga Tykhorskaya	21–12, 21–13	(gold) Winner

BWF Junior International Grand Prix tournament
BWF Junior International Challenge tournament
BWF Junior International Series tournament
BWF Junior Future Series tournament

== See also ==
- Ukrainian National Badminton Championships
