= Yevheniia Kantemyr =

Ukrainian badminton player (born 2005)

Personal information
- Born: 4 July 2005 (age 21)
- Height: 1.67 m (5 ft 6 in)

Sport
- Country: Ukraine
- Sport: Badminton
- Handedness: Right

Women's singles & doubles
- Highest ranking: 70 (WS, 29 September 2026); 19 (WD with Polina Buhrova, 15 April 2025); 54 (XD with Oleksii Titov, 14 January 2025)
- Current ranking: 81 (WS); 30 (WD with Polina Buhrova); 215 (XD with Oleksii Titov) (10 November 2026)
- BWF profile
Medal record
Women's badminton
Representing Ukraine
European Championships
Bronze medal – third place	2026 Huelva	Women's doubles
European Women's Team Championships
Bronze medal – third place	2026 Istanbul	Women's team
European Junior Championships
Bronze medal – third place	2022 Belgrade	Mixed team

Yevheniia Kantemyr (Ukrainian: Євгенія Кантемир; born 4 July 2005) is a Ukrainian badminton player.

== Career ==
Kantemyr was born in Ukraine in 2005. She studied at Kharkiv Professional Sports College. In 2022, she along with her family were displaced as a result of Putin's war on Ukraine. Her mother and brother live in Slovakia, while she first moved to France and then Italy.

In November 2024, she and Buhrova made history as they reached a world tour tournament final at the 2024 Hylo Open, first for any Ukrainian player(s) across all five disciplines.

Kantemyr made history with the national team by winning the bronze medal at the 2026 European Women's Team Championships.

== Achievements ==
=== European Championships ===
Women's doubles
Year	Venue	Partner	Opponent	Score	Result
2026	Palacio de los Deportes Carolina Marín; Huelva, Spain	(Ukraine) Polina Buhrova	(Bulgaria) Gabriela Stoeva (Bulgaria) Stefani Stoeva	12–21, 3–21	Bronze

=== BWF World Tour (1 runner-up) ===
The BWF World Tour, which was announced on 19 March 2017 and implemented in 2018, is a series of elite badminton tournaments sanctioned by the Badminton World Federation (BWF). The BWF World Tours are divided into levels of World Tour Finals, Super 1000, Super 750, Super 500, Super 300, and the BWF Tour Super 100.

Women's doubles
Year	Tournament	Level	Partner	Opponent	Score	Result	Ref.
2024	Hylo Open	Super 300	(Ukraine) Polina Buhrova	(Chinese Taipei) Sung Shuo-yun (Chinese Taipei) Yu Chien-hui	16–21, 14–21	(silver) Runner-up	

=== BWF International Challenge/Series (2 titles, 6 runners-up) ===
Women's singles
Year	Tournament	Opponent	Score	Result	Ref.
2024	El Salvador International	(Brazil) Juliana Viana Vieira	10–21, 14–21	(silver) Runner-up	

Women's doubles
Year	Tournament	Partner	Opponent	Score	Result
2024	Kazakhstan International	(Ukraine) Polina Buhrova	(Japan) Kaho Osawa (Japan) Mai Tanabe	walkover	(silver) Runner-up
2024	Mexican International	(Ukraine) Polina Buhrova	(Mexico) Romina Fregoso (Mexico) Miriam Rodríguez	21–12, 21–16	(gold) Winner
2024	Turkey International	(Ukraine) Polina Buhrova	(Spain) Paula López (Spain) Lucía Rodríguez	walkover	(silver) Runner-up
2024	Bangladesh International	(Ukraine) Polina Buhrova	(Thailand) Kodchaporn Chaichana (Thailand) Pannawee Polyiam	23–25, 21–18, 11–21	(silver) Runner-up
2025	Astana International	(Ukraine) Polina Buhrova	(Indonesia) Lanny Tria Mayasari (Indonesia) Amallia Cahaya Pratiwi	21–12, 11–21, 21–13	(gold) Winner

Mixed doubles
Year	Tournament	Partner	Opponent	Score	Result
2024	Iceland International	(Ukraine) Oleksii Titov	(Denmark) Mikkel Klinggaard (Denmark) Naja Abildgaard	11–21, 16–21	(silver) Runner-up
2024	Dutch International	(Ukraine) Oleksii Titov	(England) Rory Easton (England) Lizzie Tolman	13–21, 14–21	(silver) Runner-up

BWF International Challenge tournament
BWF International Series tournament
BWF Future Series tournament
