= Nao Yamakita =

Japanese badminton player (born 2005)

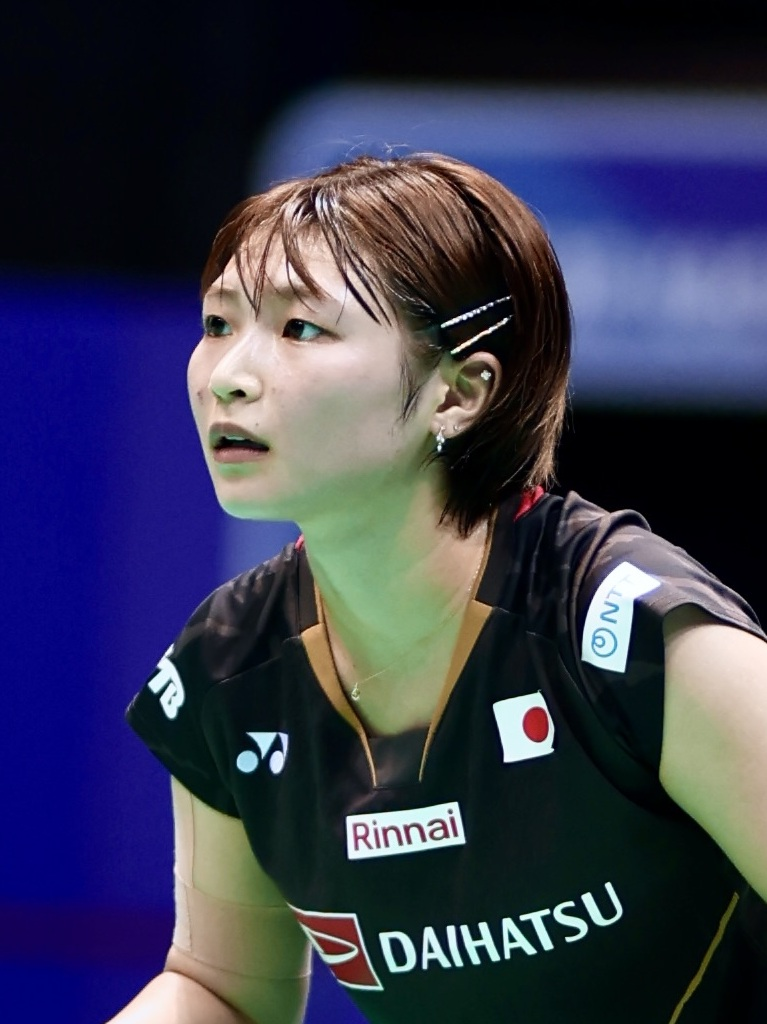
- Yamakita at the 2025 Kaohsiung Masters

Personal information
- Native name: 山北 奈緒
- Born: 30 October 2005 (age 21) Tsurugashima, Saitama Prefecture, Japan
- Height: 1.64 m (5 ft 5 in)

Sport
- Country: Japan
- Sport: Badminton
- Handedness: Right
- Coached by: Naru Shinoya

Women's doubles
- Career record: 101 wins, 31 losses (76.52%)
- Highest ranking: 13 (with Hinata Suzuki, 27 October 2026)
- Current ranking: 17 (with Hinata Suzuki, 17 November 2026)
- BWF profile
Medal record
Women's badminton
Representing Japan
World Junior Championships
Bronze medal – third place	2022 Santander	Mixed team
Bronze medal – third place	2023 Spokane	Girls' doubles
Asian Junior Championships
Gold medal – first place	2023 Yogyakarta	Mixed team
Gold medal – first place	2023 Yogyakarta	Girls' doubles

Nao Yamakita (山北 奈緒, Yamakita Nao; born 30 October 2005) is a Japanese badminton player who specializes in women's doubles. A former member of the Japanese national team, she plays for the NTT East team and has reached a career-high world ranking of No. 13 in women's doubles alongside her partner Hinata Suzuki.

On the BWF World Tour, Yamakita has won two Super 300 titles, claiming her maiden tour title at the 2025 Korea Masters and a second at the 2026 Canada Open. She also reached the final of the Super 750 2026 Denmark Open.

During her junior career, Yamakita won gold medals in both the girls' doubles (partnering Mei Sudo) and the mixed team event at the 2023 Asia Junior Championships. She also earned a bronze medal in girls' doubles and a mixed team event at the 2023 World Junior Championships.

== Career ==
=== 2019–2023: Junior career and first senior title ===
Yamakita's junior career included winning the U17 mixed doubles title at the 2019 Asian Junior Championships with partner Yudai Okimoto. In 2022, she and Maya Taguchi reached the finals of three European junior tournaments, including the Croatia Junior and Bulgaria Junior Opens.

In 2023, Yamakita partnered with Mei Sudo to win the German Junior title. The pair subsequently claimed the gold medal at the Asian Junior Championships by defeating South Korea's Park Seul and Yeon Seo-yeon in the final. They also earned a bronze medal at the World Junior Championships in Spokane. Yamakita was part of the Japanese squad that secured its first mixed team gold medal in 11 years at the Asian Junior Championships, as well as a bronze at the World Junior Championships. She made her senior international debut in June 2023 at the Guatemala Future Series, winning the women's doubles title with Sudo and finishing as runner-up in mixed doubles with Kenta Matsukawa.

=== 2024–2025: First World Tour title and world top 40 ===
After joining the NTT East badminton team, Yamakita partnered with Naru Shinoya to win the 2024 Malaysia International. In 2025, she began a partnership with Hinata Suzuki. The duo won the Saipan International and finished as runners-up at both the Northern Marianas Open and the Super 100 Kaohsiung Masters. In November 2025, Yamakita won her first World Tour title at the Super 300 Korea Masters, defeating Kim So-yeong and Lee Seo-jin in straight games. Following this victory, she reached a career-high world ranking of 37 in women's doubles.

=== 2026: Canada Open title ===
In May, Yamakita and Suzuki reached the quarterfinals of the Thailand Open. The following month, the pair made their Super 1000 debut at the Indonesia Open, advancing to the second round before losing to world No. 1 Liu Shengshu and Tan Ning. Later in June, Yamakita and Suzuki reached the semifinals of the U.S. Open, where they were defeated by compatriots and eventual champions Sumire Nakade and Miyu Takahashi. In July, Yamakita secured her second Super 300 title at the Canada Open, defeating Kaho Osawa and Mai Tanabe in the final.

In October, Yamakita and Suzuki reached the final of the Super 750 Denmark Open, where they lost to Malaysia's Pearly Tan and Thinaah Muralitharan.

== Achievements ==
=== World Junior Championships ===
Girls' doubles
Year	Venue	Partner	Opponent	Score	Result	Ref.
2023	The Podium; Spokane, United States	(Japan) Mei Sudo	(United States) Francesca Corbett (United States) Allison Lee	21–18, 16–21, 13–21	Bronze	

=== Asian Junior Championships ===
Girls' doubles
Year	Venue	Partner	Opponent	Score	Result	Ref.
2023	Among Rogo Sports Hall; Yogyakarta, Indonesia	(Japan) Mei Sudo	(South Korea) Park Seul (South Korea) Yeon Seo-yeon	21–19, 14–21, 23–21	Gold	

=== BWF World Tour (2 titles, 2 runners-up) ===
The BWF World Tour, which was announced on 19 March 2017 and implemented in 2018, is a series of elite badminton tournaments sanctioned by the Badminton World Federation (BWF). The BWF World Tour is divided into levels of World Tour Finals, Super 1000, Super 750, Super 500, Super 300, and the BWF Tour Super 100.

Women's doubles
Year	Tournament	Level	Partner	Opponent	Score	Result	Ref.
2025	Kaohsiung Masters	Super 100	(Japan) Hinata Suzuki	(Japan) Ririna Hiramoto (Japan) Kokona Ishikawa	16–21, 17–21	(silver) Runner-up	
2025	Korea Masters	Super 300	(Japan) Hinata Suzuki	(South Korea) Kim So-yeong (South Korea) Lee Seo-jin	21–18, 25–23	(gold) Winner	
2026	Canada Open	Super 300	(Japan) Hinata Suzuki	(Japan) Kaho Osawa (Japan) Mai Tanabe	21–15, 21–16	(gold) Winner	
2026	Denmark Open	Super 750	(Japan) Hinata Suzuki	(Malaysia) Pearly Tan (Malaysia) Thinaah Muralitharan	18–21, 11–21	(silver) Runner-up	

=== BWF International Challenge/Series (3 titles, 2 runners-up) ===
Women's doubles
Year	Tournament	Partner	Opponent	Score	Result	Ref.
2023	Guatemala Future Series	(Japan) Mei Sudo	(Japan) Tomoka Miyazaki (Japan) Maya Taguchi	16–21, 21–14, 25–23	(gold) Winner	
2024	Malaysia International	(Japan) Naru Shinoya	(Japan) Hinata Suzuki (Japan) An Uesugi	21–13, 12–21, 21–17	(gold) Winner	
2025	Northern Marianas Open	(Japan) Hinata Suzuki	(Japan) Ririna Hiramoto (Japan) Kokona Ishikawa	17–21, 15–21	(silver) Runner-up	
2025	Saipan International	(Japan) Hinata Suzuki	(Japan) Nanako Hara (Japan) Riko Kiyose	15–13, 8–15, 15–11	(gold) Winner	

Mixed doubles
Year	Tournament	Partner	Opponent	Score	Result	Ref.
2023	Guatemala Future Series	(Japan) Kenta Matsukawa	(Japan) Daigo Tanioka (Japan) Maya Taguchi	18–21, 19–21	(silver) Runner-up	

BWF International Challenge tournament
BWF Future Series tournament

=== BWF Junior International (2 titles, 3 runners-up) ===
Girls' doubles
Year	Tournament	Partner	Opponent	Score	Result	Ref.
2022	Croatia Junior Open	(Japan) Maya Taguchi	(Japan) Rui Kiyama (Japan) Kanano Muroya	19–21, 19–21	(silver) Runner-up	
2022	Bulgaria Junior Open	(Japan) Maya Taguchi	(Japan) Rui Kiyama (Japan) Kanano Muroya	14–21, 21–19, 17–21	(silver) Runner-up	
2022	Malaysia Junior International	(Japan) Maya Taguchi	(Japan) Rui Kiyama (Japan) Kanano Muroya	19–21, 17–21	(silver) Runner-up	
2023	German Junior	(Japan) Mei Sudo	(China) Li Huazhou (China) Zhang Yuhan	21–11, 19–21, 21–18	(gold) Winner	
2023	Pembangunan Jaya Raya Junior	(Japan) Mei Sudo	(Indonesia) Ariella Naqiyyah (Indonesia) Rachel Agnesia Sabatini	21–17, 21–9	(gold) Winner	

BWF Junior International Grand Prix tournament
BWF Junior International Challenge tournament
BWF Junior International Series tournament

== Performance timeline ==
Key

W	Won	F	Finalist	SF	Semi-finalist
QF	Quarter-finalist	#R	Rounds 4, 3, 2, 1	RR	Round-robin stage
Q#	Qualification round	A	Absent	w/d	Withdrew
G	Gold	S	Silver	B	Bronze
NH	Not held	N/A	Not applicable	DNQ	Did not qualify

=== National team ===
- Junior level

Team events	2022	2023	Ref
Asian Junior Championships	NH	G	
World Junior Championships	B	5th	

- Senior level

Team events	2026	Ref
Asia Team Championships	5th	

=== Individual competitions ===
==== Junior level ====
- Girls' doubles

Events	2022	2023	Ref
Asian Junior Championships	NH	G	
World Junior Championships	3R	B	

- Mixed doubles

Events	2022	2023	Ref
Asian Junior Championships	NH	2R	
World Junior Championships	A	QF	

==== Senior level ====
Women's doubles

Tournament	BWF World Tour				Best	Ref
Tournament	2023	2024	2025	2026	Best	Ref
Swiss Open	A			1R	1R ('26)	
Ruichang China Masters	A		QF	A	QF ('25)	
Orléans Masters	A			1R	1R ('26)	
Thailand Open	A			QF	QF ('26)	
Singapore Open	A			1R	1R ('26)	
Indonesia Open	A			2R	2R ('26)	
U.S. Open	A			SF	SF ('26)	
Canada Open	A			W	W ('26)	
Japan Open	1R	A		QF	QF ('26)	
China Open	A			2R	2R ('26)	
Korea Masters	1R	A	W	A	W ('25)	
Indonesia Masters Super 100	2R	A	QF	A	QF ('25)	
Denmark Open	A			F	F ('26)	
French Open	A			QF	QF ('26)	
Korea Open	A			2R	2R ('26)	
Japan Masters	A		2R	1R	2R ('25)	
Year-end ranking	—	—	41		41	
Tournament	2023	2024	2025	2026	Best	Ref

== Wins over top-10 ranked pairs ==
Wins over pairs who were ranked in the world's top 10 at the time the match was played.

#	Partner	Opponent	Rk	Tournament	Rd	Score	Rk	Ref.
1	(Japan) Hinata Suzuki	(Japan) Rin Iwanaga (Japan) Kie Nakanishi	7	2026 Japan Open	2R	21–15, 18–21, 21–11	19	
2	(Japan) Hinata Suzuki	(Japan) Yuki Fukushima (Japan) Mayu Matsumoto	3	2026 Denmark Open	2R	11–6, retired	21	
3	(Japan) Hinata Suzuki	(Chinese Taipei) Hsu Yin-hui (Chinese Taipei) Lin Jhih-yun	6	2026 French Open	1R	14–21, 23–21, 21–14	16	

== Record against selected opponents ==
Record against year-end Finals finalists, World Championships semi-finalists, and Olympic quarter-finalists. Accurate as of 20 October 2026.

=== Hinata Suzuki ===
Players	M	W	L	Diff.
(China) Liu Shengshu & Tan Ning	1	0	1	–1
(Japan) Yuki Fukushima & Mayu Matsumoto	3	1	2	–1
(Japan) Rin Iwanaga & Kie Nakanishi	3	1	2	–1
(Malaysia) Pearly Tan & Thinaah Muralitharan	1	0	1	–1
(Thailand) Benyapa Aimsaard & Nuntakarn Aimsaard	1	1	0	+1
