= 2023 Badminton Asia Junior Championships – Teams event =

2023 Badminton Asia Junior Championships

2023 Badminton Asia Junior Championships Teams event
Tournament details
- Dates: 7–11 July 2023
- Edition: 23rd
- Level: International
- Nations: 14
- Venue: Among Rogo Sports Hall
- Location: Yogyakarta, Indonesia

The teams event of the 2023 Badminton Asia Junior Championships was held from 7–11 July 2023. Thailand was the champion of the last edition held in Suzhou, China in 2019 before COVID-19 pandemic.

14 countries are competing in this event. The group draw was done on 27 June. First seed, China were drawn with the host Indonesia and Vietnam in group A.

== Seedings ==
The seedings for teams competing in the tournament were released on June 20, 2023. It was based on aggregated points from the best players in the BWF World Junior Ranking.

1. China (Quarter-finals)
2. Thailand (Semi-finals)
3. Malaysia (Quarter-finals)
4. Japan (Champion)
5. Indonesia (Final)
6. Chinese Taipei (Semi-finals)
7. India (Quarter-finals)
8. United Arab Emirates (Group stage)
9. South Korea (Quarter-finals)
10. Singapore (Group stage)
11. Bangladesh (Group stage)
12. Vietnam (Group stage)
13. Hong Kong (Group stage)
14. Philippines (Group stage)

== Group stage ==
=== Group A ===
Pos	Team	Pld	W	L	MF	MA	MD	GF	GA	GD	PF	PA	PD	Pts	Qualification	Indonesia	People's Republic of China	Vietnam
1	Indonesia (H)	2	2	0	9	1	+8	18	6	+12	469	361	+108	2	Advance to knockout stage	—	4–1	5–0
2	China	2	1	1	6	4	+2	15	8	+7	436	363	+73	1	Advance to knockout stage		—	5–0
3	Vietnam	2	0	2	0	10	−10	1	20	−19	255	436	−181	0				—

Source: TS
(H) Host

==== China vs Vietnam ====
China
5
Among Rogo Sports Hall, Court 2
7 July 2023, 08:30 UTC+7

Vietnam
0

			1	2	3
1	(China) (Vietnam)	Zhu Yijun / Huang Kexin; Trần Hoàng Kha / Huỳnh Khánh My	21; 18	21; 8
2	(China) (Vietnam)	Xu Wenjing; Lê Ngọc Vân	21; 14	21; 14
3	(China) (Vietnam)	Hu Zhean; Trần Quốc Khánh	21; 5	21; 17
4	(China) (Vietnam)	Liao Lixi / Zhang Wenxiao; Bùi Bích Phương / Trần Thị Ánh	21; 6	21; 9
5	(China) (Vietnam)	Ma Shang / Zhu Yijun; Nguyễn Văn Mai / Phạm Văn Trường	21; 16	21; 13

==== Indonesia vs Vietnam ====
Indonesia
5
Among Rogo Sports Hall, Court 1
8 July 2023, 09:00 UTC+7

Vietnam
0

			1	2	3
1	(Indonesia) (Vietnam)	Adrian Pratama / Felisha Pasaribu; Phạm Văn Trường / Bùi Bích Phương	21; 15	21; 12
2	(Indonesia) (Vietnam)	Alwi Farhan; Trần Quốc Khánh	21; 14	21; 17
3	(Indonesia) (Vietnam)	Mutiara Ayu Puspitasari; Lê Ngọc Vân	21; 15	16; 21	21; 5
4	(Indonesia) (Vietnam)	Muhammad Al Farizi / Nikolaus Joaquin; Lê Minh Sơn / Nguyễn Hoàng Thái Sơn	21; 7	21; 14
5	(Indonesia) (Vietnam)	Anisanaya Kamila / Az Zahra Ditya Ramadhani; Huỳnh Khánh My / Trần Thị Ánh	21; 5	21; 10

==== China vs Indonesia ====
China
1
Among Rogo Sports Hall, Court 1
9 July 2023, 09:00 UTC+7

Indonesia
4

			1	2	3
1	(China) (Indonesia)	Zhu Yijun / Huang Kexin; Adrian Pratama / Felisha Pasaribu	16; 21	25; 23	10; 21
2	(China) (Indonesia)	Xu Wenjing; Mutiara Ayu Puspitasari	21; 12	21; 10
3	(China) (Indonesia)	Hu Zhean; Alwi Farhan	19; 21	11; 21
4	(China) (Indonesia)	Liao Lixi / Zhang Wenxiao; Anisanaya Kamila / Az Zahra Ditya Ramadhani	21; 17	19; 21	12; 21
5	(China) (Indonesia)	Ma Shang / Zhu Yijun; Muhammad Al Farizi / Nikolaus Joaquin	15; 21	21; 13	15; 21

=== Group B ===
Pos	Team	Pld	W	L	MF	MA	MD	GF	GA	GD	PF	PA	PD	Pts	Qualification	Japan	Chinese Taipei for Olympic games	Singapore	Philippines
1	Japan	3	3	0	13	2	+11	26	8	+18	672	521	+151	3	Advance to knockout stage	—	3–2	5–0	5–0
2	Chinese Taipei	3	2	1	12	3	+9	25	8	+17	645	510	+135	2	Advance to knockout stage		—	5–0	5–0
3	Singapore	3	1	2	3	12	−9	9	24	−15	543	628	−85	1				—	3–2
4	Philippines	3	0	3	2	13	−11	7	27	−20	489	690	−201	0					—

Source: TS

==== Japan vs Philippines ====
Japan
5
Among Rogo Sports Hall, Court 3
7 July 2023, 08:30 UTC+7

Philippines
0

			1	2	3
1	(Japan) (Philippines)	Kenta Matsukawa / Nao Yamakita; Mark Anthony Bernal / Mary Destiny Untal	21; 12	21; 3
2	(Japan) (Philippines)	Miku Kohara; Christel Rei Fuentespina	21; 8	21; 16
3	(Japan) (Philippines)	Rui Sato; Jamal Rahmat Pandi	21; 14	21; 7
4	(Japan) (Philippines)	Ririna Hiramoto / Riko Kiyose; Andrea Hernandez / Dianne Libaton	21; 19	15; 21	21; 4
5	(Japan) (Philippines)	Kosuke Kakuta / Kaito Sugawara; Mark Anthony Bernal / John Benedict Gam	21; 14	15; 21	21; 15

==== Chinese Taipei vs Singapore ====
Chinese Taipei
5
Among Rogo Sports Hall, Court 4
7 July 2023, 08:30 UTC+7

Singapore
0

			1	2	3
1	(Chinese Taipei) (Singapore)	Lai Po-yu / Yang Chu-yun; Nge Joo Jin / Heng Xiao En	21; 18	21; 12
2	(Chinese Taipei) (Singapore)	Peng Yu-wei; Megan Lee	21; 13	21; 17
3	(Chinese Taipei) (Singapore)	Lin Yu-cheng; Marcus Lau	21; 19	13; 21	22; 20
4	(Chinese Taipei) (Singapore)	Hsieh Yi-en / Lin Yu-hao; Li Zheng Hong / Li Zheng Yan	21; 19	21; 8
5	(Chinese Taipei) (Singapore)	Lai Po-yu / Tsai Fu-cheng; Nge Joo Jin / Safin Noor	21; 0	21; 0

==== Japan vs Singapore ====
Japan
5
Among Rogo Sports Hall, Court 3
7 July 2023, 16:00 UTC+7

Singapore
0

			1	2	3
1	(Japan) (Singapore)	Daigo Tanioka / Maya Taguchi; Nge Joo Jin / Li Zheng Hong	21; 16	21; 17
2	(Japan) (Singapore)	Yuna Nakagawa; Marcus Lau	21; 15	21; 12
3	(Japan) (Singapore)	Mihane Endo; Megan Lee	16; 21	22; 20	21; 15
4	(Japan) (Singapore)	Kenta Matsukawa / Yuto Nakashizu; Nicholas Kat / Mark Wong	21; 15	21; 17
5	(Japan) (Singapore)	Mei Sudo / Nao Yamakita; Heng Xiao En / Elsa Lai	21; 16	21; 13

==== Chinese Taipei vs Philippines ====
Chinese Taipei
5
Among Rogo Sports Hall, Court 4
7 July 2023, 16:00 UTC+7

Philippines
0

			1	2	3
1	(Chinese Taipei) (Philippines)	Lai Po-yu / Yang Chu-yun; John Benedict Gam / Mary Destiny Untal	21; 19	21; 16
2	(Chinese Taipei) (Philippines)	Wang Yu-si; Althea Dawn Ocampo	21; 13	21; 7
3	(Chinese Taipei) (Philippines)	Ma Cheng-yi; Jamal Pandi	21; 11	21; 23	21; 6
4	(Chinese Taipei) (Philippines)	Du Yi-chen / Lin Yu-hao; Andrea Hernandez / Dianne Libaton	21; 15	21; 19
5	(Chinese Taipei) (Philippines)	Huang Jui-hsuan / Tsai Fu-cheng; Mark Anthony Bernal / John Benedict Gam	21; 12	21; 17

==== Singapore vs Philippines ====
Singapore
3
Among Rogo Sports Hall, Court 1
8 July 2023, 16:00 UTC+7

Philippines
2

			1	2	3
1	(Singapore) (Philippines)	Nge Joo Jin / Li Zheng Hong; Mark Anthony Bernal / Mary Destiny Untal	21; 16	21; 17
2	(Singapore) (Philippines)	Megan Lee; Althea Dawn Ocampo	21; 11	21; 9
3	(Singapore) (Philippines)	Remus Ng; Jamal Pandi	24; 22	21; 8
4	(Singapore) (Philippines)	Heng Xiao En / Elsa Lai; Andrea Hernandez / Dianne Libaton	17; 21	21; 10	15; 21
5	(Singapore) (Philippines)	Nicholas Kat / Mark Wong; Mark Anthony Bernal / John Benedict Gam	18; 21	19; 21

==== Japan vs Chinese Taipei ====
Japan
3
Among Rogo Sports Hall, Court 2
8 July 2023, 16:00 UTC+7

Chinese Taipei
2

			1	2	3
1	(Japan) (Chinese Taipei)	Daigo Tanioka / Maya Taguchi; Lai Po-yu / Yang Chu-yun	21; 16	14; 21	21; 17
2	(Japan) (Chinese Taipei)	Yuna Nakagawa; Lin Yu-cheng	16; 21	13; 21
3	(Japan) (Chinese Taipei)	Tomoka Miyazaki; Wang Pei-yu	21; 6	22; 20
4	(Japan) (Chinese Taipei)	Kenta Matsukawa / Yuto Nakashizu; Huang Jui-hsuan / Tsai Fu-cheng	19; 21	16; 21
5	(Japan) (Chinese Taipei)	Mei Sudo / Nao Yamakita; Du Yi-chen / Lin Yu-hao	21; 14	21; 12

=== Group C ===
Pos	Team	Pld	W	L	MF	MA	MD	GF	GA	GD	PF	PA	PD	Pts	Qualification	Malaysia	India	Hong Kong	Bangladesh
1	Malaysia	3	3	0	15	0	+15	30	4	+26	682	427	+255	3	Advance to knockout stage	—	5–0	5–0	5–0
2	India	3	2	1	10	5	+5	23	11	+12	643	503	+140	2	Advance to knockout stage		—	5–0	5–0
3	Hong Kong	3	1	2	4	11	−7	11	22	−11	534	600	−66	1				—	4–1
4	Bangladesh	3	0	3	1	14	−13	2	29	−27	315	644	−329	0					—

Source: TS

==== Malaysia vs Hong Kong ====
Malaysia
5
Among Rogo Sports Hall, Court 1
7 July 2023, 16:00 UTC+7

Hong Kong
0

			1	2	3
1	(Malaysia) (Hong Kong)	Bryan Goonting / Chan Wen Tse; Deng Chi Fai / Liu Hoi Kiu	21; 12	21; 13
2	(Malaysia) (Hong Kong)	Eogene Ewe; Lam Ka To	21; 13	21; 18
3	(Malaysia) (Hong Kong)	Siti Zulaikha; Liang Ka Wing	15; 21	21; 17	21; 14
4	(Malaysia) (Hong Kong)	Kang Khai Xing / Aaron Tai; Awan Usman / Deng Chi Fai	21; 9	21; 15
5	(Malaysia) (Hong Kong)	Ong Xin Yee / Carmen Ting; Anna Liu Hoi Kiu / Wong Yan Lam	21; 8	21; 7

==== India vs Bangladesh ====
India
5
Among Rogo Sports Hall, Court 2
7 July 2023, 16:00 UTC+7

Bangladesh
0

			1	2	3
1	(India) (Bangladesh)	Samarveer Sharma / Radhika Sharma; Md Nazmul Islam Joy / Smrity Rajbongshi	21; 12	21; 10
2	(India) (Bangladesh)	Ayush Shetty; S. S. M Sifat Ullah	21; 5	21; 9
3	(India) (Bangladesh)	Tara Shah; Smrity Rajbongshi	21; 2	21; 7
4	(India) (Bangladesh)	Nicholas Raj / Tushar Suveer; Md Nazmul Islam Joy / S. S. M Sifat Ullah	21; 13	21; 12
5	(India) (Bangladesh)	Taneesha Singh / Karnika Srees; Jesmin Akter Kona / Mathena Madhurjyo Biswas	21; 8	21; 15

==== Malaysia vs Bangladesh ====
Malaysia
5
Among Rogo Sports Hall, Court 3
8 July 2023, 09:00 UTC+7

Bangladesh
0

			1	2	3
1	(Malaysia) (Bangladesh)	Low Han Chen / Clarissa San; Md Nazmul Islam Joy / Smrity Rajbongshi	21; 6	21; 14
2	(Malaysia) (Bangladesh)	Lee Jan Jireh; Shahed Ahmed	21; 8	21; 8
3	(Malaysia) (Bangladesh)	Ung Yi Xing; Mathena Madhurjyo Biswas	21; 5	21; 8
4	(Malaysia) (Bangladesh)	Bryan Goonting / Aaron Tai; Shopu Naim Uddin / S. S. M Sifat Ullah	21; 8	21; 12
5	(Malaysia) (Bangladesh)	Chong Jie Yu / Lai Ting Cen; Jesmin Akter Kona / Mathena Madhurjyo Biswas	21; 8	21; 1

==== India vs Hong Kong ====
India
5
Among Rogo Sports Hall, Court 4
8 July 2023, 09:00 UTC+7

Hong Kong
0

			1	2	3
1	(India) (Hong Kong)	Samarveer Sharma / Radhika Sharma; Deng Chi Fai / Liu Hoi Kiu	21; 10	21; 14
2	(India) (Hong Kong)	Ayush Shetty; Lam Ka To	21; 14	21; 9
3	(India) (Hong Kong)	Tara Shah; Liang Ka Wing	21; 23	21; 16	21; 13
4	(India) (Hong Kong)	Nicholas Raj / Tushar Suveer; Cyrus Chung Ching / Yung King To	21; 16	21; 17
5	(India) (Hong Kong)	Srinidhi Narayanan / Radhika Sharma; Liang Ka Wing / Liu Hoi Kiu	21; 12	21; 19

==== Bangladesh vs Hong Kong ====
Bangladesh
1
Among Rogo Sports Hall, Court 3
8 July 2023, 16:00 UTC+7

Hong Kong
4

			1	2	3
1	(Bangladesh) (Hong Kong)	Md Nazmul Islam Joy / Smrity Rajbongshi; Cyrus Chung Ching / Lo Shu Ting	11; 21	10; 21
2	(Bangladesh) (Hong Kong)	Mathena Madhurjyo Biswas; Yi Wong	7; 21	7; 21
3	(Bangladesh) (Hong Kong)	S. S. M Sifat Ullah; Yung King To	12; 21	21; 16	21; 19
4	(Bangladesh) (Hong Kong)	Mathena Madhurjyo Biswas / Smrity Rajbongshi; Chan Wing Lam / Yan Lam Yanes Wong	13; 21	7; 21
5	(Bangladesh) (Hong Kong)	Md Nazmul Islam Joy / S. S. M Sifat Ullah; Usman Awan / Cyrus Chung Ching	17; 21	18; 21

==== Malaysia vs India ====
Malaysia
5
Among Rogo Sports Hall, Court 4
8 July 2023, 16:00 UTC+7

India
0

			1	2	3
1	(Malaysia) (India)	Low Han Chen / Chong Jie Yu; Samarveer Sharma / Radhika Sharma	18; 21	21; 15	21; 10
2	(Malaysia) (India)	Eogene Ewe; Lakshay Sharma	21; 14	21; 15
3	(Malaysia) (India)	Ong Xin Yee; Rakshitha Ramraj	21; 13	5; 21	21; 15
4	(Malaysia) (India)	Bryan Goonting / Aaron Tai; Nicholas Raj / Tushar Suveer	21; 12	21; 19
5	(Malaysia) (India)	Ong Xin Yee / Carmen Ting; Rakshitha Ramraj / Shriyanshi Valishetty	21; 14	14; 21	21; 12

=== Group D ===
Pos	Team	Pld	W	L	MF	MA	MD	GF	GA	GD	PF	PA	PD	Pts	Qualification	South Korea	Thailand	United Arab Emirates
1	South Korea	2	2	0	10	0	+10	20	2	+18	453	319	+134	2	Advance to knockout stage	—		
2	Thailand	2	1	1	5	5	0	12	11	+1	418	386	+32	1	Advance to knockout stage	0–5	—	5–0
3	United Arab Emirates	2	0	2	0	10	−10	1	20	−19	268	434	−166	0		0–5		—

Source: TS

==== Thailand vs South Korea ====
Thailand
0
Among Rogo Sports Hall, Court 1
7 July 2023, 08:30 UTC+7

South Korea
5

			1	2	3
1	(Thailand) (South Korea)	Tanakorn Meechai / Fungfa Korpthammakit; Park Beom-soo / Yeon Seo-yeon	21; 16	19; 21	19; 21
2	(Thailand) (South Korea)	Saranporn Sombutwatthananukool; Kim Min-ji	8; 21	20; 22
3	(Thailand) (South Korea)	Wongsup Wongsup-in; Park Sung-ju	18; 21	21; 16	15; 21
4	(Thailand) (South Korea)	Hathaithip Mijad / Huzwaney Momin; Kim Min-sun / Park Seul	14; 21	15; 21
5	(Thailand) (South Korea)	Songpon Sae-ma / Phurinath Saikamma; Lee Jong-min / Park Beom-soo	14; 21	10; 21

==== United Arab Emirates vs South Korea ====
United Arab Emirates
0
Among Rogo Sports Hall, Court 2
8 July 2023, 09:00 UTC+7

South Korea
5

			1	2	3
1	(United Arab Emirates) (South Korea)	Dev Vishnu / Taabia Khan; Lee Jong-min / Park Seul	12; 21	18; 21
2	(United Arab Emirates) (South Korea)	Mysha Omer Khan; Kim Min-sun	4; 21	9; 21
3	(United Arab Emirates) (South Korea)	Bharath Latheesh; Park Sung-ju	16; 21	16; 21
4	(United Arab Emirates) (South Korea)	Aleena Qathun / Nayonika Rajesh; Kim Min-ji / Yeon Seo-yeon	10; 21	8; 21
5	(United Arab Emirates) (South Korea)	Dev Ayyappan / Dhiren Ayyappan; Lee Jong-min / Park Beom-soo	16; 21	16; 21

==== Thailand vs United Arab Emirates ====
Thailand
5
Among Rogo Sports Hall, Court 2
9 July 2023, 09:00 UTC+7

United Arab Emirates
0

			1	2	3
1	(Thailand) (United Arab Emirates)	Phuwanat Horbanluekit / Patida Srisawat; Dev Vishnu / Taabia Khan	21; 14	21; 8
2	(Thailand) (United Arab Emirates)	Nachakorn Pusri; Bharath Latheesh	21; 12	21; 14
3	(Thailand) (United Arab Emirates)	Sirada Roongpiboonsopit; Sanika Dhawan Gurav	21; 8	21; 12
4	(Thailand) (United Arab Emirates)	Nontakorn Thong-on / Thanadol Yunmongkol; Dev Ayyappan / Dhiren Ayyappan	21; 16	14; 21	21; 14
5	(Thailand) (United Arab Emirates)	Hathaithip Mijad / Huzwaney Momin; Nayonika Rajesh / Sreeyuktha Sreejith Parol	21; 13	21; 11

== Knockout stage ==
Quarter-finals
10 July
Malaysia	0
Thailand	3
10 July
Indonesia	3
India	1
10 July
Chinese Taipei	3
South Korea	0
10 July
China	1
Japan	3

Semi-finals
10 July
Thailand	0
Indonesia	3
10 July
Chinese Taipei	1
Japan	3

Final
11 July
Indonesia	2
Japan	3

=== Quarterfinals ===
==== Malaysia vs Thailand ====
Malaysia
0
Among Rogo Sports Hall, Court 3
10 July 2023, 09:00 UTC+7

Thailand
3

			1	2	3
1	(Malaysia) (Thailand)	Low Han Chen / Chong Jie Yu; Tanakorn Meechai / Fungfa Korpthammakit	20; 22	16; 21
2	(Malaysia) (Thailand)	Eogene Ewe; Wongsup Wongsup-in	21; 17	17; 21	17; 21
3	(Malaysia) (Thailand)	Ung Yi Xing; Saranporn Sombutwatthananukool	15; 21	9; 21
4	(Malaysia) (Thailand)	Bryan Goonting / Aaron Tai; Phuwanat Horbanluekit / Thanadol Yunmongkol				not played
5	(Malaysia) (Thailand)	Ong Xin Yee / Carmen Ting; Hathaithip Mijad / Patida Srisawat				not played

==== Indonesia vs India ====
Indonesia
3
Among Rogo Sports Hall, Court 1
10 July 2023, 09:00 UTC+7

India
1

			1	2	3
1	(Indonesia) (India)	Adrian Pratama / Felisha Pasaribu; Samarveer Sharma / Radhika Sharma	21; 16	21; 15
2	(Indonesia) (India)	Alwi Farhan; Ayush Shetty	18; 21	21; 15	21; 19
3	(Indonesia) (India)	Ruzana; Rakshitha Ramraj	18; 21	21; 10	21; 23
4	(Indonesia) (India)	Muhammad Al Farizi / Nikolaus Joaquin; Divyam Arora / Mayank Rana	21; 10	15; 21	21; 12
5	(Indonesia) (India)	Anisanaya Kamila / Az Zahra Ditya Ramadhani; Srinidhi Narayanan / Radhika Sharma				not played

==== Chinese Taipei vs South Korea ====
Chinese Taipei
3
Among Rogo Sports Hall, Court 4
10 July 2023, 09:00 UTC+7

South Korea
0

			1	2	3
1	(Chinese Taipei) (South Korea)	Lai Po-yu / Yang Chu-yun; Park Beom-soo / Yeon Seo-yeon	21; 12	21; 15
2	(Chinese Taipei) (South Korea)	Lin Yu-cheng; Park Sung-ju	21; 16	21; 16
3	(Chinese Taipei) (South Korea)	Wang Yu-si; Kim Min-ji	13; 21	21; 17	21; 9
4	(Chinese Taipei) (South Korea)	Huang Jui-hsuan / Tsai Fu-cheng; Lee Jong-min / Park Beom-soo				not played
5	(Chinese Taipei) (South Korea)	Lin Yu-hao / Yang Chu-yun; Kim Min-sun / Park Seul				not played

==== China vs Japan ====
China
1
Among Rogo Sports Hall, Court 2
10 July 2023, 09:00 UTC+7

Japan
3

			1	2	3
1	(China) (Japan)	Zhu Yijun / Huang Kexin; Daigo Tanioka / Maya Taguchi	23; 21	16; 21	21; 19
2	(China) (Japan)	Xu Wenjing; Tomoka Miyazaki	11; 21	21; 19	17; 21
3	(China) (Japan)	Hu Zhean; Yudai Okimoto	21; 19	17; 21	14; 21
4	(China) (Japan)	Li Huazhou / Zhang Wenxiao; Mei Sudo / Nao Yamakita	19; 21	21; 13	15; 21
5	(China) (Japan)	Ma Shang / Zhu Yijun; Kenta Matsukawa / Daigo Tanioka				not played

=== Semifinals ===
==== Thailand vs Indonesia ====
Thailand
0
Among Rogo Sports Hall, Court 1
10 July 2023, 16:00 UTC+7

Indonesia
3

			1	2	3
1	(Thailand) (Indonesia)	Tanakorn Meechai / Fungfa Korpthammakit; Adrian Pratama / Felisha Pasaribu	13; 21	15; 21
2	(Thailand) (Indonesia)	Nachakorn Pusri; Alwi Farhan	21; 19	8; 21	11; 21
3	(Thailand) (Indonesia)	Saranporn Sombutwatthananukool; Mutiara Ayu Puspitasari	21; 17	7; 21	18; 21
4	(Thailand) (Indonesia)	Phuwanat Horbanluekit / Thanadol Yunmongkol; Muhammad Al Farizi / Nikolaus Joaquin				not played
5	(Thailand) (Indonesia)	Hathaithip Mijad / Patida Srisawat; Anisanaya Kamila / Az Zahra Ditya Ramadhani				not played

==== Chinese Taipei vs Japan ====
Chinese Taipei
1
Among Rogo Sports Hall, Court 2
10 July 2023, 16:00 UTC+7

Japan
3

			1	2	3
1	(Chinese Taipei) (Japan)	Lai Po-yu / Yang Chu-yun; Daigo Tanioka / Maya Taguchi	21; 9	21; 14
2	(Chinese Taipei) (Japan)	Lin Yu-cheng; Yudai Okimoto	18; 21	10; 21
3	(Chinese Taipei) (Japan)	Wang Yu-si; Tomoka Miyazaki	11; 21	10; 21
4	(Chinese Taipei) (Japan)	Huang Jui-hsuan / Tsai Fu-cheng; Kenta Matsukawa / Daigo Tanioka	15; 21	20; 22
5	(Chinese Taipei) (Japan)	Lin Yu-hao / Yang Chu-yun; Mei Sudo / Nao Yamakita				not played

=== Finals ===
==== Indonesia vs Japan ====
Indonesia
2
Among Rogo Sports Hall, Court 1
11 July 2023, 10:00 UTC+7

Japan
3

			1	2	3
1	(Indonesia) (Japan)	Adrian Pratama / Felisha Pasaribu; Daigo Tanioka / Maya Taguchi	8; 21	20; 22
2	(Indonesia) (Japan)	Mutiara Ayu Puspitasari; Tomoka Miyazaki	21; 17	21; 16
3	(Indonesia) (Japan)	Alwi Farhan; Yudai Okimoto	21; 13	14; 21	21; 14
4	(Indonesia) (Japan)	Anisanaya Kamila / Az Zahra Ditya Ramadhani; Mei Sudo / Nao Yamakita	19; 21	21; 14	21; 23
5	(Indonesia) (Japan)	Muhammad Al Farizi / Nikolaus Joaquin; Kenta Matsukawa / Daigo Tanioka	11; 21	21; 19	13; 21
