= Riko Kiyose =

Japanese badminton player (born 2005)

Personal information
- Born: 16 July 2005 (age 21) Kanagawa Prefecture, Japan
- Height: 1.70 m (5 ft 7 in)

Sport
- Country: Japan
- Sport: Badminton
- Handedness: Right
- Coached by: Satoko Suetsuna

Women's doubles
- Career record: 34 wins, 23 losses (59.65%)
- Highest ranking: 43 (with Nanako Hara, 10 March 2026)
- Current ranking: 59 (with Nanako Hara, 17 November 2026)
- BWF profile
Medal record
Women's badminton
Representing Japan
World Junior Championships
Bronze medal – third place	2022 Santander	Girls' doubles
Bronze medal – third place	2022 Santander	Mixed team
Bronze medal – third place	2023 Spokane	Girls' doubles
Asian Junior Championships
Gold medal – first place	2023 Yogyakarta	Mixed team

Riko Kiyose (清瀬 璃子, Kiyose Riko; born 16 July 2005) is a Japanese badminton player. She is from Kanagawa Prefecture and is a Gifu Bluvic Badminton Team member. She was a two-time bronze medalist in girls' doubles at the World Junior Championships in 2022 and 2023. Kiyose won her first BWF World Tour title at the Odisha Masters.

== Early career ==
Kiyose attended NP Kanagawa for middle school and then Aomori Yamada Junior High and High School. During her school years, Kiyose competed in national badminton, particularly in girls' doubles, winning the 2022 Inter-High School Championship and the 2023 National High School Invitational Badminton Championships. Kiyose was a member of the U-19 national team in 2022 and 2023, where she was coached by former Olympic medalists Ayaka Takahashi and Reika Kakiiwa. On the international junior circuit, she won the girls' doubles title at the 2023 Dutch Junior International partnering Ririna Hiramoto.

At the World Junior Championships, Kiyose won consecutive bronze medals in the girls' doubles. In 2022 semifinals, she and partner Kokona Ishikawa lost to eventual champions, Liu Shengshu and Wang Tingge of China. In 2023, she reached the semifinals again with Ririna Hiramoto, where they were defeated by their compatriots and eventual champions, Maya Taguchi and Aya Tamaki.

In the team events, Kiyose contributed to Japan's bronze medal win at the 2022 World Junior Championships. The following year, she was a member of the team that won the 2023 Asian Junior Championships, marking Japan's first victory in mixed team event since 2012.

== Career ==
In 2024, Kiyose began competing on the BWF World Tour, debuting at the Thailand Masters, a Super 300 tournament. She partnered with Yuki Fukushima, losing in the first round to the third-seeded Chinese pair, Li Wenmei and Liu Xuanxuan. On 1 April 2024, Kiyose joined the Gifu Bluvic badminton team. Later that year, she won her first BWF World Tour title at the Super 100 Odisha Masters with partner Nanako Hara.

In 2025, Kiyose was a runner-up in two events at the Saipan International: women's doubles with Hara and mixed doubles with Kenta Matsukawa.

== Awards and nominations ==
Award	Year	Category	Result	Ref.
Tō-Ō Sports Award	2022	National Achievement with Kokona Ishikawa	Won	
Aomori City Sports Award	2023	Sports Encouragement Award	Won	

== Achievements ==
=== World Junior Championships ===
Girls' doubles
Year	Venue	Partner	Opponent	Score	Result	Ref.
2022	Palacio de Deportes de Santander; Santander, Spain	(Japan) Kokona Ishikawa	(China) Liu Shengshu (China) Wang Tingge	21–17, 13–21, 17–21	Bronze	
2023	The Podium; Spokane, Washington, United States	(Japan) Ririna Hiramoto	(Japan) Maya Taguchi (Japan) Aya Tamaki	21–13, 7–21, 19–21	Bronze	

=== BWF World Tour (1 title) ===
The BWF World Tour, which was announced on 19 March 2017 and implemented in 2018, is a series of elite badminton tournaments sanctioned by the Badminton World Federation (BWF). The BWF World Tour is divided into levels of World Tour Finals, Super 1000, Super 750, Super 500, Super 300, and the BWF Tour Super 100.

Women's doubles
Year	Tournament	Level	Partner	Opponent	Score	Result	Ref.
2024	Odisha Masters	Super 100	(Japan) Nanako Hara	(China) Keng Shuliang (China) Wang Tingge	21–11, 21–19	(gold) Winner	

=== BWF International Challenge/Series (2 runners-up) ===
Women's doubles
Year	Tournament	Partner	Opponent	Score	Result	Ref.
2025	Saipan International	(Japan) Nanako Hara	(Japan) Hinata Suzuki (Japan) Nao Yamakita	13–15, 15–8, 11–15	(silver) Runner-up	

Mixed doubles
Year	Tournament	Partner	Opponent	Score	Result	Ref.
2025	Saipan International	(Japan) Kenta Matsukawa	(South Korea) An Yun-seong (South Korea) Lee Yu-lim	16–18, 12–15	(silver) Runner-up	

BWF International Challenge tournament

=== BWF Junior International (1 title) ===
Girls' doubles
Year	Tournament	Partner	Opponent	Score	Result	Ref.
2023	Dutch Junior	(Japan) Ririna Hiramoto	(South Korea) Park Seul (South Korea) Yeon Seo-yeon	21–10, 13–21, 23–21	(gold) Winner	

BWF Junior International Grand Prix tournament

== Performance timeline ==
Key

W	Won	F	Finalist	SF	Semi-finalist
QF	Quarter-finalist	#R	Rounds 4, 3, 2, 1	RR	Round-robin stage
Q#	Qualification round	A	Absent	w/d	Withdrew
G	Gold	S	Silver	B	Bronze
NH	Not held	N/A	Not applicable	DNQ	Did not qualify

=== National team ===
Junior level

Team events	2022	2023	Ref
Asian Junior Championships	NH	G	
World Junior Championships	B	5th	

=== Individual competitions ===
==== Junior level ====
- Girls' doubles

Events	2022	2023	Ref
Asian Junior Championships	NH	2R	
World Junior Championships	B	B	

- Mixed doubles

Events	2022	2023	Ref
Asian Junior Championships	NH	3R	

==== Women's doubles ====
Tournament	BWF World Tour			Best	Ref
Tournament	2024	2025	2026	Best	Ref
Malaysia Open	A		1R	1R ('26)	
India Open	A		2R	2R ('26)	
Thailand Masters	1R	A	1R	1R ('25, '26)	
Ruichang China Masters	QF	QF	1R	QF ('24, '25)	
Australian Open	A	2R	A	2R ('25)	
Macau Open	A	2R	A	2R ('25)	
U.S. Open	A		1R	1R ('26)	
Canada Open	A		2R	2R ('26)	
Japan Open	A	1R	A	1R ('25)	
Taipei Open	A	2R	2R	2R ('25, '26)	
Korea Masters	A	2R	QF	QF ('26)	
French Open	A	1R	1R	1R ('25, '26)	
Korea Open	A	1R	1R	1R ('25, '26)	
Japan Masters	A	2R	Q2	2R ('25)	
Hong Kong Open	A		1R	1R ('26)	
Guwahati Masters	A		Q	('26)	
Odisha Masters	W	A		W ('24)	
Year-end ranking	171	50		50	
Tournament	2024	2025	2026	Best	Ref

==== Mixed doubles ====
Tournament	BWF World Tour	Best	Ref
Tournament	2026	Best	Ref
Korea Masters	1R	1R ('26)	

== Record against selected opponents ==
Record against year-end Finals finalists, World Championships semi-finalists, and Olympic quarter-finalists. Accurate as of 6 November 2026.

=== Nanako Hara ===
Players	M	W	L	Diff.
(Indonesia) Apriyani Rahayu & Siti Fadia Silva Ramadhanti	1	0	1	–1
(Japan) Yuki Fukushima & Mayu Matsumoto	2	0	2	–2
(South Korea) Baek Ha-na & Lee So-hee	1	0	1	–1
