= 2023 Badminton Asia Junior Championships – Girls' doubles =

Tournament details
- Dates: 12 – 16 July 2023
- Edition: 23rd
- Level: International
- Venue: Among Rogo Sports Hall
- Location: Yogyakarta, Indonesia

The girls' doubles tournament of the 2023 Badminton Asia Junior Championships was held from 12 to 16 July. Li Yijing and Luo Xumin of China clinched this title in the last edition in 2019 before COVID-19 pandemic.

== Seeds ==
Seeds were announced on 20 June. Click on the seed number of a player to go to their draw section.

1. (Japan) Mei Sudo / Nao Yamakita (Champions)
2. (Thailand) Fungfa Korpthammakit / Patida Srisawat (Third round)
3. (Malaysia) Ong Xin Yee / Carmen Ting (Third round)
4. (Indonesia) Anisanaya Kamila / Az Zahra Ditya Ramadhani (Third round)
5. (Thailand) Hathaithip Mijad / Huzwaney Momin (Second round)
6. (Malaysia) Chong Jie Yu / Lai Ting Chen (Second round)
7. (Malaysia) Clarissa San / Siti Zulaikha (Second round)
8. (China) Li Huazhou / Zhang Yuhan (Semi-finals)

== Draw ==
=== Finals ===
Quarter-finals
1	(Japan) Mei Sudo (Japan) Nao Yamakita	21	21
(China) Liao Lixi (China) Zhang Wenxiao	15	16
(Japan) Maya Taguchi (Japan) Aya Tamaki	21	15	21
(Chinese Taipei) Hsieh Yi-en (Chinese Taipei) Lin Yu-hao	13	21	19
8	(China) Li Huazhou (China) Zhang Yuhan	21	21
(Indonesia) Nabila Cahya Permata Ayu (Indonesia) Reva Olivia Damayani	19	14
(China) Chen Fanshutian (China) Jiang Peixi	18	15
(South Korea) Park Seul (South Korea) Yeon Seo-yeon	21	21

Semi-finals
1	(Japan) Mei Sudo (Japan) Nao Yamakita	21	27
(Japan) Maya Taguchi (Japan) Aya Tamaki	16	25
8	(China) Li Huazhou (China) Zhang Yuhan	19	19
(South Korea) Park Seul (South Korea) Yeon Seo-yeon	21	21

Final
1	(Japan) Mei Sudo (Japan) Nao Yamakita	21	14	23
(South Korea) Park Seul (South Korea) Yeon Seo-yeon	19	21	21

=== Top half ===
==== Section 1 ====
First round
(Malaysia) Chan W T (Malaysia) V Gobi	10	16
(Indonesia) V Christina (Indonesia) B A Wardana	21	21
(Indonesia) A Naqiyyah (Indonesia) R A Sabatini	21	21
(United Arab Emirates) T Khan (United Arab Emirates) M Omer Khan	12	7
(Chinese Taipei) Chung C-e (Chinese Taipei) Huang T-l	11	10
(China) Liao LX (China) Zhang WX	21	21

Second round
1	(Japan) M Sudo (Japan) N Yamakita	21	21
(South Korea) Kim M-j (South Korea) Kim M-s	9	19
(India) R Sharma (India) T Sharma	14	10
(Indonesia) V Christina (Indonesia) B A Wardana	21	21
5	(Thailand) H Mijad (Thailand) H Momin	10	17
(Indonesia) A Naqiyyah (Indonesia) R A Sabatini	21	21
(Sri Lanka) G Dewmi Mithara (Sri Lanka) T T Wijesooriya	6	3
(China) Liao LX (China) Zhang WX	21	21

Third round
1	(Japan) M Sudo (Japan) N Yamakita	21	21
(Indonesia) V Christina (Indonesia) B A Wardana	15	16
(Indonesia) A Naqiyyah (Indonesia) R A Sabatini	26	13	12
(China) Liao LX (China) Zhang WX	24	21	21

Quarterfinals
1	(Japan) M Sudo (Japan) N Yamakita
(China) Liao LX (China) Zhang WX

==== Section 2 ====
First round
(Philippines) A P Hernandez (Philippines) P D Libaton	15	21	23
(Singapore) Li ZH (Singapore) Li ZY	21	19	25
(Hong Kong) A Liu H K (Hong Kong) Lo S T	12	11
(South Korea) Kim D-y (South Korea) Kwak S-m	21	21
(Vietnam) Huynh K M (Vietnam) Le N V	21	21
(Sri Lanka) S De Silva (Sri Lanka) N Palliyaguruge	7	8
(China) Wang D (China) Xiao Y	21	21
(Thailand) K Nakthongtip (Thailand) N Utsanon	17	17

Second round
4	(Indonesia) A Kamila (Indonesia) A Z D Ramadhani	21	21
(Singapore) Li ZH (Singapore) Li ZY	4	17
(Japan) M Taguchi (Japan) A Tamaki	21	21
(South Korea) Kim D-y (South Korea) Kwak S-m	14	17
6	(Malaysia) Chong J Y (Malaysia) Lai T C	25	21	18
(Vietnam) Huynh K M (Vietnam) Le N V	27	17	21
(Chinese Taipei) Hsieh Y-e (Chinese Taipei) Lin Y-h	21	19	21
(China) Wang D (China) Xiao Y	15	21	10

Third round
4	(Indonesia) A Kamila (Indonesia) A Z D Ramadhani	21	16	16
(Japan) M Taguchi (Japan) A Tamaki	16	21	21
(Vietnam) Huynh K M (Vietnam) Le N V	12	12
(Chinese Taipei) Hsieh Y-e (Chinese Taipei) Lin Y-h	21	21

Quarterfinals
(Japan) M Taguchi (Japan) A Tamaki
(Chinese Taipei) Hsieh Y-e (Chinese Taipei) Lin Y-h

=== Bottom half ===
==== Section 3 ====
First round
(South Korea) Cheon H-i (South Korea) Kim T-y	21	23
(Indonesia) M R Fitria (Indonesia) M A Putri	13	21
(Singapore) Heng X E (Singapore) E Lai Y T	21	15	15
(Chinese Taipei) Peng Y-w (Chinese Taipei) Wang Y-s	17	21	21
(United Arab Emirates) A Qathun (United Arab Emirates) N Rajesh	16	13
(Thailand) P Pattanawaritthipan (Thailand) N Phanich	21	21
(Bangladesh) M M Biswas (Bangladesh) S Rajbongshi	8	8
(Hong Kong) Liang K W (Hong Kong) Y Wong Y L	21	21

Second round
(South Korea) Cheon H-i (South Korea) Kim T-y	21	21
(Sri Lanka) C Jayawardana (Sri Lanka) H Nallaperuma Arachchi	6	7
(Chinese Taipei) Peng Y-w (Chinese Taipei) Wang Y-s	12	21	22
8	(China) Li HZ (China) Zhang YH	21	18	24
(Thailand) P Pattanawaritthipan (Thailand) N Phanich	11	21	14
(Indonesia) N C P Ayu (Indonesia) R O Damayani	21	13	21
(Hong Kong) Liang K W (Hong Kong) Y Wong Y L	16	18
3	(Malaysia) Ong X Y (Malaysia) C Ting	21	21

Third round
(South Korea) Cheon H-i (South Korea) Kim T-y	8	19
8	(China) Li HZ (China) Zhang YH	21	21
(Indonesia) N C P Ayu (Indonesia) R O Damayani	24	16	21
3	(Malaysia) Ong X Y (Malaysia) C Ting	22	21	17

Quarterfinals
8	(China) Li HZ (China) Zhang YH
(Indonesia) N C P Ayu (Indonesia) R O Damayani

==== Section 4 ====
First round
(Hong Kong) Chan W L (Hong Kong) Wong Y	25	13
(Vietnam) Bùi B P (Vietnam) Trần T Á	27	21
(China) Chen FST (China) Jiang PX	21	21
(Philippines) A P Hernandez (Philippines) M D Untal	11	14
(South Korea) Park S (South Korea) Yeon S-y	21	21
(Chinese Taipei) Du Y-c (Chinese Taipei) Yang C-y	12	16
(Sri Lanka) I Hewagallage (Sri Lanka) P Wijesundara	8	8
(Indonesia) I S Meida (Indonesia) R K Nastine	21	21

Second round
(Vietnam) Bùi B P (Vietnam) Trần T Á	14	19
(India) T Singh (India) K Srees	21	21
(China) Chen FST (China) Jiang PX	21	21
7	(Malaysia) C San (Malaysia) S Zulaikha	13	13
(South Korea) Park S (South Korea) Yeon S-y	21	21
(Japan) R Hiramoto (Japan) R Kiyose	11	14
(Indonesia) I S Meida (Indonesia) R K Nastine	20	21	19
2	(Thailand) F Korpthammakit (Thailand) P Srisawat	22	10	21

Third round
(India) T Singh (India) K Srees	21	13	13
(China) Chen FST (China) Jiang PX	17	21	21
(South Korea) Park S (South Korea) Yeon S-y	21	21
2	(Thailand) F Korpthammakit (Thailand) P Srisawat	17	11

Quarterfinals
(China) Chen FST (China) Jiang PX
(South Korea) Park S (South Korea) Yeon S-y
