= Ririna Hiramoto =

Japanese badminton player (born 2006)

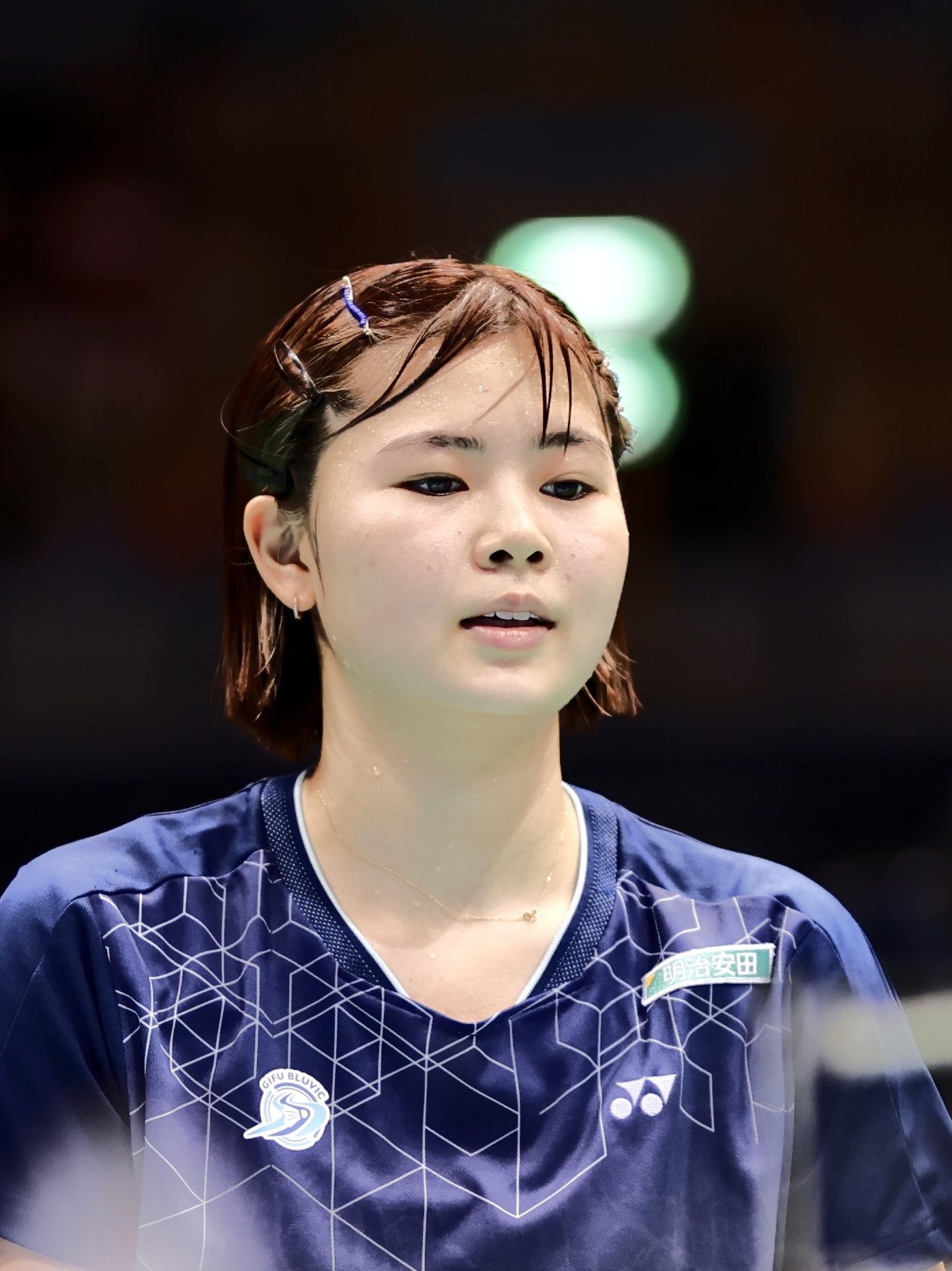
- Hiramoto at the 2025 Kaohsiung Masters

Personal information
- Born: 19 May 2006 (age 20) Ikeda, Gifu Prefecture, Japan
- Height: 1.73 m (5 ft 8 in)

Sport
- Country: Japan
- Sport: Badminton
- Handedness: Right
- Coached by: Keiko Yoshitomi; Satoko Suetsuna

Women's doubles
- Career record: 45 wins, 21 losses (68.18%)
- Highest ranking: 23 (with Kokona Ishikawa, 9 June 2026)
- Current ranking: 95 (with Chiharu Shida, 17 November 2026)
- BWF profile
Medal record
Women's badminton
Representing Japan
World Junior Championships
Gold medal – first place	2024 Nanchang	Girls' doubles
Bronze medal – third place	2023 Spokane	Girls' doubles
Bronze medal – third place	2024 Nanchang	Mixed team
Asian Junior Championships
Gold medal – first place	2023 Yogyakarta	Mixed team
Bronze medal – third place	2024 Yogyakarta	Girls' doubles

Ririna Hiramoto (平本 梨々菜, Hiramoto Ririna; born 19 May 2006) is a Japanese badminton player who competes in doubles. A gold medalist in girls' doubles at the 2024 World Junior Championships, she won her first BWF World Tour title at the 2025 Kaohsiung Masters Super 100. Hiramoto achieved a career-high women's doubles ranking of No. 23. She currently plays for the Gifu Bluvic badminton team.

== Career ==
=== 2023–2024: Junior career ===
In 2023, Hiramoto won her first junior international title in girls' doubles at the Dutch Junior International with partner Riko Kiyose. The pair subsequently earned a bronze medal at the World Junior Championships. Later that year, Hiramoto partnered with Aya Tamaki to finish as a runner-up at the Thailand Junior International.

Continuing their partnership in 2024, Hiramoto and Tamaki won the gold medal in girls' doubles at the World Junior Championships. They also secured a bronze medal at the Asian Junior Championships. Hiramoto was part of the team that won the 2023 Asian Junior Championships, marking Japan's first victory in the mixed team event since 2012. She also contributed to Japan's bronze medal win at the 2024 World Junior Championships.

=== 2025: First World Tour title and world top 40 ===
Hiramoto turned professional in 2025, joining Gifu Bluvic, a team based in her home prefecture. Forming a new partnership with Kokona Ishikawa, Hiramoto won her first senior international title at the Northern Marianas Open. The pair subsequently captured their first BWF World Tour title at the Kaohsiung Masters, a Super 100 event. They also finished as runners-up at the Super 100 Indonesia Masters I and reached the semifinals of the Indonesia Masters II. The pair concluded the 2025 season with a semifinal appearance at the Super 500 Australian Open.

=== 2026 ===
In January, Hiramoto was selected for the Japanese U24 national team for the first time, alongside Kokona Ishikawa.. Hiramoto and Ishikawa opened the season with a Super 1000 debut at the Malaysia Open. They advanced to the quarter-finals, where they were defeated by the eventual champions, Liu Shengshu and Tan Ning. Hiramoto achieved a career-high world ranking of 23 on 9 June. On 4 September, the Badminton Association of Japan announced that it had accepted the pair's request to withdraw from the U24 national team following their decision to dissolve their partnership.

The split allowed Hiramoto to team up with 2024 Olympic bronze medallist Chiharu Shida, a fellow Aomori Yamada High School graduate. The pairing came about after Shida, who was competing as an independent player, spent nearly two weeks training at Hiramoto's club, Gifu Bluvic. The pair made their international debut at the French Open in October. They advanced to the quarterfinals, defeating Sayaka Hirota and Ayako Sakuramoto in the second round before losing to Rin Iwanaga and Kie Nakanishi. Hiramoto and Shida reached their first final together at the Japan Masters. They defeated defending champions Pearly Tan and Thinaah Muralitharan in the first round before finishing as runners-up to Iwanaga and Nakanishi.

== Achievements ==
=== World Junior Championships ===
Girls' doubles
Year	Venue	Partner	Opponent	Score	Result	Ref.
2023	The Podium; Spokane, Washington, United States	(Japan) Riko Kiyose	(Japan) Maya Taguchi (Japan) Aya Tamaki	21–13, 7–21, 19–21	Bronze	
2024	Nanchang International Sports Center; Nanchang, China	(Japan) Aya Tamaki	(Malaysia) Low Zi Yu (Malaysia) Dania Sofea	21–17, 21–17	Gold	

=== Asian Junior Championships ===
Girls' doubles
Year	Venue	Partner	Opponent	Score	Result	Ref.
2024	Among Rogo Sports Hall; Yogyakarta, Indonesia	(Japan) Aya Tamaki	(South Korea) Kim Min-ji (South Korea) Yeon Seo-yeon	21–15, 17–21, 18–21	Bronze	

=== BWF World Tour (1 title, 2 runners-up) ===
The BWF World Tour, which was announced on 19 March 2017 and implemented in 2018, is a series of elite badminton tournaments sanctioned by the Badminton World Federation (BWF). The BWF World Tour is divided into levels of World Tour Finals, Super 1000, Super 750, Super 500, Super 300, and the BWF Tour Super 100.

Women's doubles
Year	Tournament	Level	Partner	Opponent	Score	Result	Ref.
2025	Indonesia Masters	Super 100	(Japan) Kokona Ishikawa	(Chinese Taipei) Lin Xiao-min (Chinese Taipei) Wang Yu-qiao	17–21, 9–21	(silver) Runner-up	
2025	Kaohsiung Masters	Super 100	(Japan) Kokona Ishikawa	(Japan) Hinata Suzuki (Japan) Nao Yamakita	21–16, 21–17	(gold) Winner	
2026	Japan Masters	Super 500	(Japan) Chiharu Shida	(Japan) Rin Iwanaga (Japan) Kie Nakanishi	19–21, 15–21	(silver) Runner-up	

=== BWF International Challenge/Series (1 title) ===
Women's doubles
Year	Tournament	Partner	Opponent	Score	Result	Ref.
2025	Northern Marianas Open	(Japan) Kokona Ishikawa	(Japan) Hinata Suzuki (Japan) Nao Yamakita	21–17, 21–15	(gold) Winner	

BWF International Challenge tournament

=== BWF Junior International (1 title, 1 runner-up) ===
Girls' doubles
Year	Tournament	Partner	Opponent	Score	Result	Ref.
2023	Dutch Junior International	(Japan) Riko Kiyose	(South Korea) Park Seul (South Korea) Yeon Seo-yeon	21–10, 13–21, 23–21	(gold) Winner	
2023	Thailand Junior International	(Japan) Aya Tamaki	(Thailand) Naphachanok Utsanon (Thailand) Sabrina Wedler	24–22, 19–21, 19–21	(silver) Runner-up	

BWF Junior International Grand Prix tournament
BWF Junior International Series tournament

== Performance timeline ==
Key

W	Won	F	Finalist	SF	Semi-finalist
QF	Quarter-finalist	#R	Rounds 4, 3, 2, 1	RR	Round-robin stage
Q#	Qualification round	A	Absent	w/d	Withdrew
G	Gold	S	Silver	B	Bronze
NH	Not held	N/A	Not applicable	DNQ	Did not qualify

=== National team ===
Junior level

Team events	2023	2024	Ref.
Asian Junior Championships	G	7th	
World Junior Championships	5th	B	

=== Individual competitions ===
==== Junior level ====
Girls' doubles

Events	2023	2024	Ref.
Asian Junior Championships	2R	B	
World Junior Championships	B	G	

==== Senior level ====
===== Women's doubles =====
Tournament	BWF World Tour		Best	Ref.
Tournament	2025	2026	Best	Ref.
Malaysia Open	A	QF	QF ('26)	
India Open	A	1R	1R ('26)	
Thailand Masters	A	2R	2R ('26)	
All England Open	A	1R	1R ('26)	
Ruichang China Masters	2R	2R	2R ('25, '26)	
Singapore Open	A	2R	2R ('26)	
Indonesia Open	A	2R	2R ('26)	
Australian Open	SF	A	SF ('25)	
Macau Open	Q1	A	Q1 ('25)	
U.S. Open	A	1R	1R ('26)	
Canada Open	A	QF	QF ('26)	
Japan Open	1R	1R	1R ('25, '26)	
China Open	A	1R	1R ('26)	
Taipei Open	A	2R	2R ('26)	
Korea Masters	2R	2R	2R ('25, '26)	
Indonesia Masters Super 100	F	A	F ('25)	
Indonesia Masters Super 100	SF	A	F ('25)	
French Open	A	QF	QF ('26)	
Korea Open	A	2R	2R ('26)	
Japan Masters	1R	F	F ('26)	
Kaohsiung Masters	W	A	W ('25)	
Hong Kong Open	A	1R	1R ('26)	
Guwahati Masters	A	Q	('26)	
Year-end ranking	37		23	
Tournament	2025	2026	Best	Ref.

== Wins over top-10 ranked pairs ==
Wins over pairs who were ranked in the world's top 10 at the time the match was played.

#	Partner	Opponent	Rk	Tournament	Rd	Score	PRk	Ref.
1	(Japan) Kokona Ishikawa	(Chinese Taipei) Hsieh Pei-shan (Chinese Taipei) Hung En-tzu	9	2026 Malaysia Open	2R	21–14, 15–21, 21–18	37	
2	(Japan) Chiharu Shida	(Malaysia) Pearly Tan (Malaysia) Thinaah Muralitharan	4	2026 Japan Masters	1R	18–21, 21–13, 21–14	143	
3	(Japan) Chiharu Shida	(Indonesia) Amallia Cahaya Pratiwi (Indonesia) Siti Fadia Silva Ramadhanti	8	2026 Japan Masters	QF	21–19, 21–17	143	
4	(Japan) Chiharu Shida	(Chinese Taipei) Hsu Yin-hui (Chinese Taipei) Lin Jhih-yun	7	2026 Japan Masters	SF	23–21, 21–15	143	

== Record against selected opponents ==
Record against year-end Finals finalists, World Championships semi-finalists, and Olympic quarter-finalists. Accurate as of 15 November 2026.

=== With Chiharu Shida ===
Players	M	W	L	Diff.
(Bulgaria) Gabriela Stoeva & Stefani Stoeva	1	0	1	–1
(Japan) Rin Iwanaga & Kie Nakanishi	2	0	2	–2
(Malaysia) Pearly Tan & Thinaah Muralitharan	1	0	1	+1

=== With Kokona Ishikawa ===
Players	M	W	L	Diff.
(China) Liu Shengshu & Tan Ning	1	0	1	–1
(Indonesia) Apriyani Rahayu & Siti Fadia Silva Ramadhanti	1	0	1	–1
(South Korea) Baek Ha-na & Lee So-hee	1	0	1	–1
