= Hinata Suzuki =

Japanese badminton player (born 2002)

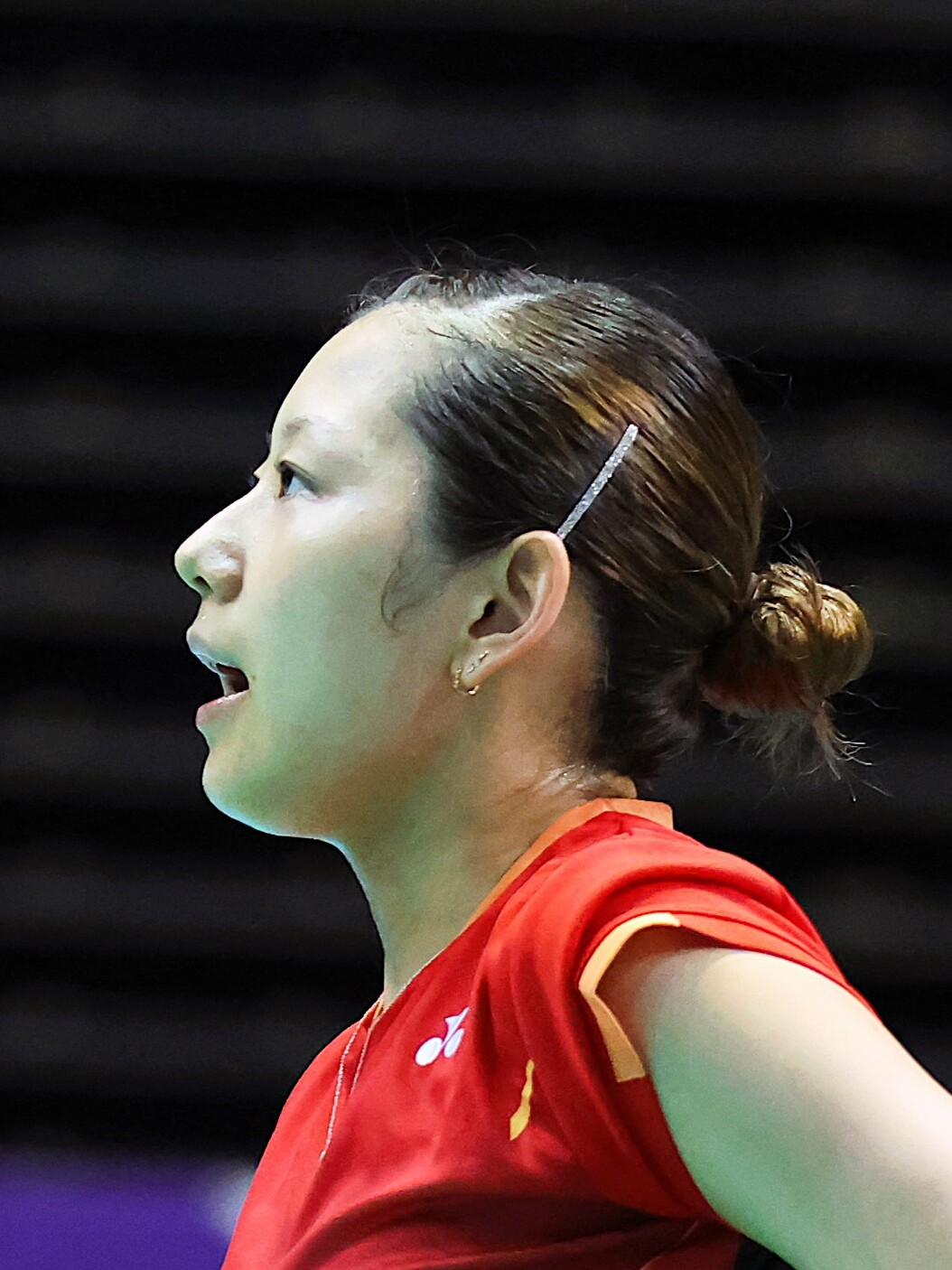
- Suzuki at the 2023 Kaohsiung Masters

Personal information
- Native name: 鈴木 陽向
- Born: 26 March 2002 (age 24) Saitama Prefecture, Japan
- Height: 1.66 m (5 ft 5 in)

Sport
- Country: Japan
- Sport: Badminton
- Handedness: Right
- Coached by: Naru Shinoya

Women's doubles
- Career record: 80 wins, 35 losses (69.57%)
- Highest ranking: 13 (with Nao Yamakita, 27 October 2026)
- Current ranking: 17 (with Nao Yamakita, 17 November 2026)
- BWF profile
Medal record
Women's badminton
Representing Japan
World Junior Championships
Bronze medal – third place	2019 Kazan	Girls' doubles
Bronze medal – third place	2019 Kazan	Mixed team

Hinata Suzuki (鈴木 陽向, Suzuki Hinata; born 26 March 2002) is a Japanese badminton player who specializes in doubles. She reached a career-high women's doubles world ranking of No. 13 with Nao Yamakita. A bronze medalist in girls' doubles at the 2019 World Junior Championships, she won her first senior international title at the 2025 Saipan International. In 2025, Suzuki won her maiden World Tour title at the Super 300 Korea Masters.

== Career ==
=== 2025: First World Tour title and world top 40 ===
In 2025, Suzuki began a partnership with Nao Yamakita. The duo won the Saipan International and finished as runners-up at the Northern Marianas Open. On the World Tour, they reached the final of the Super 100 Kaohsiung Masters. In November 2025, Suzuki won her first World Tour title at the Super 300 Korea Masters, defeating Kim So-yeong and Lee Seo-jin in straight games. Following this victory, she reached a career-high world ranking of 37 in women's doubles.

=== 2026: Canada Open title ===
In May, Suzuki and Yamakita reached the quarterfinals of the Thailand Open. In June, the pair made their Super 1000 debut at the Indonesia Open, advancing to the second round before losing to world No. 1 Liu Shengshu and Tan Ning. Later that month, Suzuki and Yamakita reached the semifinals of the U.S. Open, where they were defeated by compatriots and eventual champions Sumire Nakade and Miyu Takahashi. In July, the pair won the Canada Open, marking their second Super 300 title.

In October, Suzuki and Yamakita reached the final of the Super 750 Denmark Open, where they lost to Malaysia's Pearly Tan and Thinaah Muralitharan.

== Achievements ==
=== World Junior Championships ===
Girls' doubles
Year	Venue	Partner	Opponent	Score	Result	Ref.
2019	Kazan Gymnastics Center; Kazan, Russia	(Japan) Kaho Osawa	(China) Lin Fangling (China) Zhou Xinru	7–21, 21–16, 17–21	Bronze	

=== BWF World Tour (2 titles, 2 runners-up) ===
The BWF World Tour, which was announced on 19 March 2017 and implemented in 2018, is a series of elite badminton tournaments sanctioned by the Badminton World Federation (BWF). The BWF World Tour is divided into levels of World Tour Finals, Super 1000, Super 750, Super 500, Super 300, and the BWF Tour Super 100.

Women's doubles
Year	Tournament	Level	Partner	Opponent	Score	Result	Ref.
2025	Kaohsiung Masters	Super 100	(Japan) Nao Yamakita	(Japan) Ririna Hiramoto (Japan) Kokona Ishikawa	16–21, 17–21	(silver) Runner-up	
2025	Korea Masters	Super 300	(Japan) Nao Yamakita	(South Korea) Kim So-yeong (South Korea) Lee Seo-jin	21–18, 25–23	(gold) Winner	
2026	Canada Open	Super 300	(Japan) Nao Yamakita	(Japan) Kaho Osawa (Japan) Mai Tanabe	21–15, 21–16	(gold) Winner	
2026	Denmark Open	Super 750	(Japan) Nao Yamakita	(Malaysia) Pearly Tan (Malaysia) Thinaah Muralitharan	18–21, 11–21	(silver) Runner-up	

=== BWF International Challenge/Series (1 title, 4 runners-up) ===
Women's doubles
Year	Tournament	Partner	Opponent	Score	Result	Ref.
2022	Mexican International	(Japan) Ayako Sakuramoto	(Japan) Rui Hirokami (Japan) Yuna Kato	21–15, 19–21, 17–21	(silver) Runner-up	
2022 (II)	Indonesia International	(Japan) Sayaka Hobara	(Indonesia) Lanny Tria Mayasari (Indonesia) Ribka Sugiarto	16–21, 18–21	(silver) Runner-up	
2024	Malaysia International	(Japan) An Uesugi	(Japan) Naru Shinoya (Japan) Nao Yamakita	13–21, 21–12, 17–21	(silver) Runner-up	
2025	Northern Marianas Open	(Japan) Nao Yamakita	(Japan) Ririna Hiramoto (Japan) Kokona Ishikawa	17–21, 15–21	(silver) Runner-up	
2025	Saipan International	(Japan) Nao Yamakita	(Japan) Nanako Hara (Japan) Riko Kiyose	15–13, 8–15, 15–11	(gold) Winner	

BWF International Challenge tournament

=== BWF Junior International (1 title) ===
Girls' doubles
Year	Tournament	Partner	Opponent	Score	Result	Ref.
2019	India Junior International	(Japan) Kaho Osawa	(Thailand) Pornpicha Choeikeewong (Thailand) Pornnicha Suwatnodom	13–21, 21–15, 21–14	(gold) Winner	

BWF Junior International Grand Prix tournament

== Record against selected opponents ==
Record against year-end Finals finalists, World Championships semi-finalists, and Olympic quarter-finalists. Accurate as of 20 October 2026.

=== Nao Yamakita ===
Players	M	W	L	Diff.
(China) Liu Shengshu & Tan Ning	1	0	1	–1
(Japan) Yuki Fukushima & Mayu Matsumoto	3	1	2	–1
(Japan) Rin Iwanaga & Kie Nakanishi	3	1	2	–1
(Malaysia) Pearly Tan & Thinaah Muralitharan	1	0	1	–1
(Thailand) Benyapa Aimsaard & Nuntakarn Aimsaard	1	1	0	+1
