= 2023 BWF World Junior Championships – girls' doubles =

Tournament details
- Dates: 2 – 8 October 2023
- Edition: 23rd
- Level: International
- Venue: The Podium
- Location: Spokane, United States

The girls' doubles of the tournament 2023 BWF World Junior Championships was an individual badminton tournament to crowned the best girls' doubles under 19 player across the BWF associate members around the world. Players will compete to win the "Eye Level Cup" presented by the former BWF President and chairman of the World Youth Culture Foundation, Kang Young Joong. The tournament was held from 2 to 8 October 2023 in the Podium, Spokane, United States. The winner of the last edition were Liu Shengshu and Wang Tingge of China.

== Seeds ==
The seeds are determined based on the BWF World Junior Rankings released on 19 September 2023.

1. (Japan) Mei Sudo / Nao Yamakita (semi-final)
2. (Thailand) Fungfa Korpthammakit / Patida Srisawat (third round)
3. (United States) Francesca Corbett / Allison Lee (final)
4. (Indonesia) Anisanaya Kamila / Az Zahra Ditya Ramadhani (fourth round)
5. (France) Elsa Jacob / Camille Pognante (fourth round)
6. (China) Li Huazhou / Zhang Yuhan (quarter-final)
7. (Malaysia) Ong Xin Yee / Carmen Ting (quarter-final)
8. (Chinese Taipei) Hsieh Yi-en / Lin Yu-hao (quarter-final)

9. (Canada) Jackie Dent / Alena Yu (fourth round)
10. (Peru) Fernanda Munar Solimano / Rafaela Munar Solimano (third round)
11. (Spain) Macarena Izquierdo / Carmen Maria Jiménez (third round)
12. (Thailand) Hathaithip Mijad / Huzwaney Momin (fourth round)
13. (Germany) Amelie Lehmann / Cara Siebrecht (fourth round)
14. (Indonesia) Meisa Rizka Fitria / Maulida Aprilia Putri (second round)
15. (Japan) Ririna Hiramoto / Riko Kiyose (semi-final)
16. (Sweden) Elin Öhling / Elin Ryberg (third round)

== Draw ==
=== Finals ===
Quarter-finals
1	(Japan) Mei Sudo (Japan) Nao Yamakita	21	21
6	(China) Li Huazhou (China) Zhang Yuhan	18	19
3	(United States) Francesca Corbett (United States) Allison Lee	17	21	21
8	(Chinese Taipei) Hsieh Yi-en (Chinese Taipei) Lin Yu-hao	21	17	17
7	(Malaysia) Ong Xin Yee (Malaysia) Carmen Ting	13	14
(Japan) Maya Taguchi (Japan) Aya Tamaki	21	21
15	(Japan) Ririna Hiramoto (Japan) Riko Kiyose	21	21
(China) Chen Fanshutian (China) Zhang Wenxiao	16	14

Semi-finals
1	(Japan) Mei Sudo (Japan) Nao Yamakita	21	16	13
3	(United States) Francesca Corbett (United States) Allison Lee	18	21	21
(Japan) Maya Taguchi (Japan) Aya Tamaki	13	21	21
15	(Japan) Ririna Hiramoto (Japan) Riko Kiyose	21	7	19

Final
3	(United States) Francesca Corbett (United States) Allison Lee	21	13	15
(Japan) Maya Taguchi (Japan) Aya Tamaki	12	21	21
