= 2025 Kaohsiung Masters =

2025 badminton tournament

Tournament details
- Dates: 23 – 28 September
- Edition: 3rd
- Level: Super 100
- Total prize money: US$110,000
- Venue: Kaohsiung Arena
- Location: Kaohsiung, Taiwan

Champions
- Men's singles: (Chinese Taipei) Wang Po-wei
- Women's singles: (Japan) Nozomi Okuhara
- Men's doubles: (Japan) Kakeru Kumagai (Japan) Hiroki Nishi
- Women's doubles: (Japan) Ririna Hiramoto (Japan) Kokona Ishikawa
- Mixed doubles: (Japan) Akira Koga (Japan) Yuho Imai

The 2025 Kaohsiung Masters (officially known as the Victor Kaohsiung Masters 2025 for sponsorship reasons) was a badminton tournament which took place at Kaohsiung Arena in Kaohsiung, Taiwan from 23 to 28 September 2025 and had a total purse of $110,000.

== Tournament ==
The 2025 Kaohsiung Masters was the twenty-sixth tournament of the 2025 BWF World Tour. This was the third edition of Kaohsiung Masters. This tournament was organized by Chinese Taipei Badminton Association and sanctioned by the BWF.

=== Venue ===
This tournament was held at the Kaohsiung Arena in Kaohsiung, Taiwan.

=== Point distribution ===
Below is a table with the point distribution for each phase of the tournament based on the BWF points system for the BWF Tour Super 100 event.

Winner	Runner-up	3/4	5/8	9/16	17/32	33/64	65/128	129/256
5,500	4,680	3,850	3,030	2,110	1,290	510	240	100

=== Prize money ===
The total prize money for this tournament was US$110,000. Distribution of prize money was in accordance with BWF regulations.

Event	Winner	Finals	Semi-finals	Quarter-finals	Last 16
Singles	$8,250	$4,180	$1,595	$660	$385
Doubles	$8,690	$4,180	$1,540	$797.5	$412.5

== Men's singles ==
=== Seeds ===
1. (Thailand) Panitchaphon Teeraratsakul (final)
2. (Thailand) Kantaphon Wangcharoen (withdrew)
3. (Chinese Taipei) Huang Ping-hsien (semi-finals)
4. (Indonesia) Prahdiska Bagas Shujiwo (third round)
5. (Japan) Koo Takahashi (second round)
6. (Chinese Taipei) Wang Po-wei (champion)
7. (Malaysia) Kok Jing Hong (second round)
8. (Israel) Misha Zilberman (third round)

=== Finals ===
Semi-finals
1	(Thailand) Panitchaphon Teeraratsakul	21	21
(Japan) Riki Takei	17	9
6	(Chinese Taipei) Wang Po-wei	13	21	21
3	(Chinese Taipei) Huang Ping-hsien	21	10	15

Final
1	(Thailand) Panitchaphon Teeraratsakul	21	18	12
6	(Chinese Taipei) Wang Po-wei	12	21	21

=== Top half ===
==== Section 1 ====
First round
Q2	(Hong Kong) U Awan	14	18
(Chinese Taipei) Wang Y-k	21	21
(Singapore) J Koh	10	13
(South Korea) Kim B-j	21	21
(Australia) K C Teoh	7	8
Q7	(Chinese Taipei) Yih C-h	21	21
(Malaysia) Chua K S	7	14
(Japan) Y Okimoto	21	21

Second round
1	(Thailand) P Teeraratsakul	19	21	21
(Chinese Taipei) Wang Y-k	21	10	13
Q5	(Chinese Taipei) Chu C-j	11	15
(South Korea) Kim B-j	21	21
8	(Israel) M Zilberman	11	21	21
Q7	(Chinese Taipei) Yih C-h	21	14	18
PFQ	(Malaysia) Ong T E	9	4
(Japan) Y Okimoto	21	21

Third round
1	(Thailand) P Teeraratsakul	14	21	27
(South Korea) Kim B-j	21	13	25
8	(Israel) M Zilberman	12	5
(Japan) Y Okimoto	21	21

Quarter-finals
1	(Thailand) P Teeraratsakul	22	21
(Japan) Y Okimoto	20	11

==== Section 2 ====
First round
(Malaysia) Lim M H	21	21
(Malaysia) Lee J J	16	16
(United States) J Yang	17	18
(Malaysia) Huan K H	21	21
(Japan) R Takei	21	21
(South Korea) Jeong M-s	18	15
Q4	(Chinese Taipei) Wu Z-y	21	21
(Canada) S Gullaiya	15	13

Second round
4	(Indonesia) P Shujiwo	21	13	21
(Malaysia) Lim M H	19	21	9
(South Korea) Choi J-h	21	21
(Malaysia) Huan K H	11	7
5	(Japan) K Takahashi	19	13
(Japan) R Takei	21	21
(Hong Kong) Chan Y C	19	12
Q4	(Chinese Taipei) Wu Z-y	21	21

Third round
4	(Indonesia) P Shujiwo	15	9
(South Korea) Choi J-h	21	21
(Japan) R Takei	21	21
Q4	(Chinese Taipei) Wu Z-y	10	17

Quarter-finals
(South Korea) Choi J-h	16	10
(Japan) R Takei	21	21

=== Bottom half ===
==== Section 3 ====
First round
Q3	(Chinese Taipei) Cheng J-s	21	21
Q8	(Chinese Taipei) Shih K-c	15	10
(Canada) S Yuan	18	21	21
(Chinese Taipei) Ma C-y	21	15	7
Q1	(Chinese Taipei) Liu Y	12	18
(India) S Dayanand	21	21
(Japan) S Ogawa	21	21
(Malaysia) Ong Z Y	8	5

Second round
Q3	(Chinese Taipei) Cheng J-s	21	19	20
(Chinese Taipei) Kuo K-l	16	21	22
(Canada) S Yuan	9	16
SWM	(Malaysia) Cheam J W	21	21
(India) S Dayanand	21	21
(Thailand) K Laotrakul	18	18
(Japan) S Ogawa	14	14
6	(Chinese Taipei) Wang P-w	21	21

Third round
(Chinese Taipei) Kuo K-l	17	16
SWM	(Malaysia) Cheam J W	21	21
(India) S Dayanand	12	9
6	(Chinese Taipei) Wang P-w	21	21

Quarter-finals
SWM	(Malaysia) Cheam J W	14	19
6	(Chinese Taipei) Wang P-w	21	21

==== Section 4 ====
First round
(South Korea) Park S-y	14	15
(Chinese Taipei) Ting Y-c	21	21
(United States) G Tan	17	13
(Chinese Taipei) Liao J-f	21	21
(Chinese Taipei) Lu C-h	21	23
(Indonesia) R Richardo	14	21
(South Korea) Kim H-d	15	21	22
Q6	(Chinese Taipei) Chiang T-c	21	11	20

Second round
(Chinese Taipei) Ting Y-c	21	20	21
(Malaysia) S Lee	8	22	16
(Chinese Taipei) Liao J-f	22	17	21
7	(Malaysia) Kok J H	20	21	16
(Chinese Taipei) Lu C-h	11	21	14
(Indonesia) Y Marcellyno	21	19	21
(South Korea) Kim H-d	19	8
3	(Chinese Taipei) Huang P-h	21	21

Third round
(Chinese Taipei) Ting Y-c	18	15
(Chinese Taipei) Liao J-f	21	21
(Indonesia) Y Marcellyno	11	21	9
3	(Chinese Taipei) Huang P-h	21	15	21

Quarter-finals
(Chinese Taipei) Liao J-f	11	21	16
3	(Chinese Taipei) Huang P-h	21	17	21

== Women's singles ==
=== Seeds ===
1. (Chinese Taipei) Hsu Wen-chi (quarter-finals)
2. (Japan) Nozomi Okuhara (champion)
3. (Chinese Taipei) Huang Ching-ping (semi-finals)
4. (Chinese Taipei) Huang Yu-hsun (quarter-finals)
5. (India) Isharani Baruah (semi-finals)
6. (Chinese Taipei) Liang Ting-yu (first round)
7. (India) Devika Sihag (second round)
8. (Japan) Hina Akechi (final)

=== Finals ===
Semi-finals
8	(Japan) Hina Akechi	21	21
3	(Chinese Taipei) Huang Ching-ping	17	13
5	(India) Isharani Baruah	11	21	16
2	(Japan) Nozomi Okuhara	21	17	21

Final
8	(Japan) Hina Akechi	16	17
2	(Japan) Nozomi Okuhara	21	21

=== Top half ===
==== Section 1 ====
First round
1	(Chinese Taipei) Hsu W-c	21	21
(South Korea) Lee S-y	16	15
Q4	(Chinese Taipei) Hsieh Y-t	18	21	14
(Chinese Taipei) Lee Y-h	21	19	21
8	(Japan) H Akechi	21	21
(Chinese Taipei) Liao Y-c	16	15
(South Korea) Kim M-j	21	13	21
(Chinese Taipei) Han Y-c	15	21	17

Second round
1	(Chinese Taipei) Hsu W-c	21	21
(Chinese Taipei) Lee Y-h	12	11
8	(Japan) H Akechi	21	21
(South Korea) Kim M-j	9	17

Quarter-finals
1	(Chinese Taipei) Hsu W-c	17	17
8	(Japan) H Akechi	21	21

==== Section 2 ====
First round
3	(Chinese Taipei) Huang C-p	21	21
(Singapore) I Khan	8	10
(Chinese Taipei) Wang P-y	21	21
(United States) I Rusli	3	8
7	(India) D Sihag	26	21	21
(Singapore) M Lee	28	17	13
(India) M Singh	18	15
(Chinese Taipei) Tsai H-p	21	21

Second round
3	(Chinese Taipei) Huang C-p	11	25	21
(Chinese Taipei) Wang P-y	21	23	15
7	(India) D Sihag	21	19	14
(Chinese Taipei) Tsai H-p	19	21	21

Quarter-finals
3	(Chinese Taipei) Huang C-p	21	21
(Chinese Taipei) Tsai H-p	19	7

=== Bottom half ===
==== Section 3 ====
First round
Q2	(Chinese Taipei) Ko R-h	25	21
(Myanmar) Thet Htar T	23	17
(Thailand) N Rattanapanuwong	13	10
5	(India) I Baruah	21	21
Q1	(India) M Mareddy	21	17	14
Q3	(Thailand) Tonr Saeheng	19	21	21
(India) A Chaliha	17	18
4	(Chinese Taipei) Huang Y-h	21	21

Second round
Q2	(Chinese Taipei) Ko R-h	21	14	21
5	(India) I Baruah	15	21	23
Q3	(Thailand) Tonr Saeheng	18	11
4	(Chinese Taipei) Huang Y-h	21	21

Quarter-finals
5	(India) I Baruah	21	21
4	(Chinese Taipei) Huang Y-h	14	18

==== Section 4 ====
First round
(Thailand) Y Ketklieng	21	21
(Chinese Taipei) Huang Y-w	7	10
(Chinese Taipei) Wang Y-s	21	18	27
6	(Chinese Taipei) Liang T-y	18	21	25
(Chinese Taipei) Lin S-y	13	16
(Japan) A Takahashi	21	21
(South Korea) Kim M-s	11	12
2	(Japan) N Okuhara	21	21

Second round
(Thailand) Y Ketklieng	17	21	21
(Chinese Taipei) Wang Y-s	21	14	23
(Japan) A Takahashi	18	22	13
2	(Japan) N Okuhara	21	20	21

Quarter-finals
(Chinese Taipei) Wang Y-s	5	5
2	(Japan) N Okuhara	21	21

== Men's doubles ==
=== Seeds ===
1. (India) Pruthvi Roy / K. Sai Pratheek (first round)
2. (Chinese Taipei) Chen Zhi-ray / Lin Yu-chieh (first round)
3. (Chinese Taipei) He Zhi-wei / Huang Jui-hsuan (withdrew)
4. (Chinese Taipei) Lai Po-yu / Tsai Fu-cheng (second round)
5. (Indonesia) Raymond Indra / Nikolaus Joaquin (semi-finals)
6. (Malaysia) Chia Wei Jie / Lwi Sheng Hao (first round)
7. (Chinese Taipei) Chiang Chien-wei / Wu Hsuan-yi (first round)
8. (Japan) Kakeru Kumagai / Hiroki Nishi (champions)

=== Finals ===
Semi-finals
(Hong Kong) Hung Kuei Chun (Hong Kong) Lui Chun Wai	21	11	17
(Chinese Taipei) Su Ching-heng (Chinese Taipei) Wu Guan-xun	14	21	21
8	(Japan) Kakeru Kumagai (Japan) Hiroki Nishi	21	17	22
5	(Indonesia) Raymond Indra (Indonesia) Nikolaus Joaquin	12	21	20

Final
(Chinese Taipei) Su Ching-heng (Chinese Taipei) Wu Guan-xun	18	17
8	(Japan) Kakeru Kumagai (Japan) Hiroki Nishi	21	21

=== Top half ===
==== Section 1 ====
First round
1	(India) P Roy (India) K S Pratheek	18	14
(Malaysia) Boon X Y (Malaysia) Lee Y B	21	21
(Malaysia) B Goonting (Malaysia) Fazriq R	26	7	13
(Hong Kong) Hung K C (Hong Kong) Lui C W	24	21	21
6	(Malaysia) Chia W J (Malaysia) Lwi S H	21	18	14
Q1	(Chinese Taipei) Huang K-y (Chinese Taipei) Lin S-m	16	21	21
(Indonesia) P Erwiansyah (Indonesia) D Marvino	21	21
(Japan) T Aizawa (Japan) D Sano	14	19

Second round
(Malaysia) Boon X Y (Malaysia) Lee Y B	12	17
(Hong Kong) Hung K C (Hong Kong) Lui C W	21	21
Q1	(Chinese Taipei) Huang K-y (Chinese Taipei) Lin S-m	15	15
(Indonesia) P Erwiansyah (Indonesia) D Marvino	21	21

Quarter-finals
(Hong Kong) Hung K C (Hong Kong) Lui C W	20	21	21
(Indonesia) P Erwiansyah (Indonesia) D Marvino	22	19	19

==== Section 2 ====
First round
4	(Chinese Taipei) Lai P-y (Chinese Taipei) Tsai F-c	21	21
(Chinese Taipei) Chen C (Chinese Taipei) Chiu S-h	2	15
(Malaysia) M Faiq (Malaysia) Lok H Q	13	21	16
PFQ	(Chinese Taipei) Cheng K-w (Chinese Taipei) Liao C-p	21	19	21
7	(Chinese Taipei) Chiang C-w (Chinese Taipei) Wu H-y	15	17
(Chinese Taipei) Chen B-y (Chinese Taipei) Tang K-w	21	21
Q3	(Chinese Taipei) Hung B-f (Chinese Taipei) Liu F-s	10	16
(Chinese Taipei) Su C-h (Chinese Taipei) Wu G-x	21	21

Second round
4	(Chinese Taipei) Lai P-y (Chinese Taipei) Tsai F-c	21	17
PFQ	(Chinese Taipei) Cheng K-w (Chinese Taipei) Liao C-p	23	21
(Chinese Taipei) Chen B-y (Chinese Taipei) Tang K-w	21	19	14
(Chinese Taipei) Su C-h (Chinese Taipei) Wu G-x	17	21	21

Quarter-finals
PFQ	(Chinese Taipei) Cheng K-w (Chinese Taipei) Liao C-p	21	15	20
(Chinese Taipei) Su C-h (Chinese Taipei) Wu G-x	17	21	22

=== Bottom half ===
==== Section 3 ====
First round
(Chinese Taipei) Huang T-i (Chinese Taipei) Lin T-y	18	15
Q2	(Chinese Taipei) Bao Xin D G L W (Chinese Taipei) Chou Y-h	21	21
(Chinese Taipei) Chen S-f (Chinese Taipei) Lu C	21	18
SWM	(India) H Amsakarunan (India) Arjun M. R.	23	21
(Malaysia) Beh C M (Malaysia) Choi J S	15	21	21
Q4	(Chinese Taipei) Chen Y-c (Chinese Taipei) Tseng P-c	21	15	14
(Chinese Taipei) Wei C-w (Chinese Taipei) Yang P-c	21	18	11
8	(Japan) K Kumagai (Japan) H Nishi	16	21	21

Second round
Q2	(Chinese Taipei) Bao Xin D G L W (Chinese Taipei) Chou Y-h	10	20
SWM	(India) H Amsakarunan (India) Arjun M. R.	21	22
(Malaysia) Beh C M (Malaysia) Choi J S	16	12
8	(Japan) K Kumagai (Japan) H Nishi	21	21

Quarter-finals
SWM	(India) H Amsakarunan (India) Arjun M. R.	17	19
8	(Japan) K Kumagai (Japan) H Nishi	21	21

==== Section 4 ====
First round
(Hong Kong) Law C H (Hong Kong) Yeung S C	21	22
(Chinese Taipei) Chiu T-h (Chinese Taipei) Lu C-y	13	20
(Chinese Taipei) Cheng Y-y (Chinese Taipei) Lu M-c	13	15
5	(Indonesia) R Indra (Indonesia) N Joaquin	21	21
(Malaysia) Kang K X (Malaysia) A Tai	15	21	21
(Malaysia) Goh B Z (Malaysia) Wong V S	21	18	19
(Chinese Taipei) Lin C-y (Chinese Taipei) Lin Y-s	18	21	21
2	(Chinese Taipei) Chen Z-r (Chinese Taipei) Lin Y-c	21	17	12

Second round
(Hong Kong) Law C H (Hong Kong) Yeung S C	11	17
5	(Indonesia) R Indra (Indonesia) N Joaquin	21	21
(Malaysia) Kang K X (Malaysia) A Tai	18	12
(Chinese Taipei) Lin C-y (Chinese Taipei) Lin Y-s	21	21

Quarter-finals
5	(Indonesia) R Indra (Indonesia) N Joaquin	17	21	21
(Chinese Taipei) Lin C-y (Chinese Taipei) Lin Y-s	21	18	17

== Women's doubles ==
=== Seeds ===
1. (Thailand) Ornnicha Jongsathapornparn / Sukitta Suwachai (quarter-finals)
2. (Thailand) Laksika Kanlaha / Phataimas Muenwong (first round)
3. (Malaysia) Ong Xin Yee / Carmen Ting (quarter-finals)
4. (Chinese Taipei) Chen Yan-fei / Sun Liang-ching (quarter-finals)
5. (Chinese Taipei) Lin Xiao-min / Wang Yu-qiao (semi-finals)
6. (Chinese Taipei) Lin Chih-chun / Lin Wan-ching (second round)
7. (Chinese Taipei) Teng Chun-hsun / Yang Chu-yun (first round)
8. (Chinese Taipei) Lee Chih-chen / Lin Yen-yu (first round)

=== Finals ===
Semi-finals
(Chinese Taipei) Chen Yu-hsuan (Chinese Taipei) Liu Chiao-yun	15	16
(Japan) Ririna Hiramoto (Japan) Kokona Ishikawa	21	21
5	(Chinese Taipei) Lin Xiao-min (Chinese Taipei) Wang Yu-qiao	18	19
(Japan) Hinata Suzuki (Japan) Nao Yamakita	21	21

Final
(Japan) Ririna Hiramoto (Japan) Kokona Ishikawa	21	21
(Japan) Hinata Suzuki (Japan) Nao Yamakita	16	17

=== Top half ===
==== Section 1 ====
First round
1	(Thailand) O Jongsathapornparn (Thailand) S Suwachai	21	21
(Chinese Taipei) Chung C-e (Chinese Taipei) Wang Y-z	12	12
(Chinese Taipei) Hsieh C-y (Chinese Taipei) Huang T-l	21	21
(Chinese Taipei) Ko R-h (Chinese Taipei) Lee Y-h	19	19
7	(Chinese Taipei) Teng C-h (Chinese Taipei) Yang C-y	21	11	18
(Chinese Taipei) Chen Y-h (Chinese Taipei) Liu C-y	14	21	21
(Chinese Taipei) Huang Z-l (Chinese Taipei) Wang S-m	20	16
Q1	(Chinese Taipei) Chen H-t (Chinese Taipei) Chen Y-h	22	21

Second round
1	(Thailand) O Jongsathapornparn (Thailand) S Suwachai	21	17	23
(Chinese Taipei) Hsieh C-y (Chinese Taipei) Huang T-l	13	21	21
(Chinese Taipei) Chen Y-h (Chinese Taipei) Liu C-y	21	21
Q1	(Chinese Taipei) Chen H-t (Chinese Taipei) Chen Y-h	12	13

Quarter-finals
1	(Thailand) O Jongsathapornparn (Thailand) S Suwachai	18	18
(Chinese Taipei) Chen Y-h (Chinese Taipei) Liu C-y	21	21

==== Section 2 ====
First round
3	(Malaysia) Ong X Y (Malaysia) C Ting	24	21
Q2	(Chinese Taipei) Huang S-c (Chinese Taipei) Kung C-y	22	11
Q3	(Chinese Taipei) Chan P-h (Chinese Taipei) Liao P-c	21	21
(Chinese Taipei) Hung H-e (Chinese Taipei) Tsai R-l	18	16
6	(Chinese Taipei) Lin C-c (Chinese Taipei) Lin W-c	21	21
(Chinese Taipei) Han C (Chinese Taipei) Hsu J-y	9	8
(Chinese Taipei) Chou Y-a (Chinese Taipei) Huang K-x	21	22	12
(Japan) R Hiramoto (Japan) K Ishikawa	19	24	21

Second round
3	(Malaysia) Ong X Y (Malaysia) C Ting	21	21
Q3	(Chinese Taipei) Chan P-h (Chinese Taipei) Liao P-c	16	12
6	(Chinese Taipei) Lin C-c (Chinese Taipei) Lin W-c	21	13
(Japan) R Hiramoto (Japan) K Ishikawa	23	21

Quarter-finals
3	(Malaysia) Ong X Y (Malaysia) C Ting	19	15
(Japan) R Hiramoto (Japan) K Ishikawa	21	21

=== Bottom half ===
==== Section 3 ====
First round
(Chinese Taipei) Hung Y-e (Chinese Taipei) Wang Y-z	21	17	17
(Chinese Taipei) Cheng C-y (Chinese Taipei) Hsieh Y-t	15	21	21
(Chinese Taipei) Cheng Y-p (Chinese Taipei) Tseng Y-c	16	21	14
5	(Chinese Taipei) Lin X-m (Chinese Taipei) Wang Y-q	21	16	21
(Chinese Taipei) Chen Y-t (Chinese Taipei) Lai Y-j	26	11	16
PFQ	(Chinese Taipei) Lin J-y (Chinese Taipei) Lin Y-p	24	21	21
(Malaysia) Cheng S H (Malaysia) Tan Z Y	18	15
4	(Chinese Taipei) Chen Y-f (Chinese Taipei) Sun L-c	21	21

Second round
(Chinese Taipei) Cheng C-y (Chinese Taipei) Hsieh Y-t	15	9
5	(Chinese Taipei) Lin X-m (Chinese Taipei) Wang Y-q	21	21
PFQ	(Chinese Taipei) Lin J-y (Chinese Taipei) Lin Y-p	6	20
4	(Chinese Taipei) Chen Y-f (Chinese Taipei) Sun L-c	21	22

Quarter-finals
5	(Chinese Taipei) Lin X-m (Chinese Taipei) Wang Y-q	19	21	21
4	(Chinese Taipei) Chen Y-f (Chinese Taipei) Sun L-c	21	15	9

==== Section 4 ====
First round
(Chinese Taipei) Chang Y-j (Chinese Taipei) Li Y-h	19	13
(Malaysia) Chong J Y (Malaysia) V Ng	21	21
(Japan) H Suzuki (Japan) N Yamakita	21	17	21
8	(Chinese Taipei) Lee C-c (Chinese Taipei) Lin Y-y	12	21	16
(Chinese Taipei) Sung Y-h (Chinese Taipei) Yang Y-h	21	21
Q4	(Chinese Taipei) Chen H-n (Chinese Taipei) Hsieh M-y	13	15
(Indonesia) S Azzahra (Indonesia) A Ramadhani	11	21	21
2	(Thailand) L Kanlaha (Thailand) P Muenwong	21	16	8

Second round
(Malaysia) Chong J Y (Malaysia) V Ng	13	17
(Japan) H Suzuki (Japan) N Yamakita	21	21
(Chinese Taipei) Sung Y-h (Chinese Taipei) Yang Y-h	14	9
(Indonesia) S Azzahra (Indonesia) A Ramadhani	21	21

Quarter-finals
(Japan) H Suzuki (Japan) N Yamakita	21	23
(Indonesia) S Azzahra (Indonesia) A Ramadhani	15	21

== Mixed doubles ==
=== Seeds ===
1. (Malaysia) Jimmy Wong / Lai Pei Jing (semi-finals)
2. (Chinese Taipei) Wu Guan-xun / Lee Chia-hsin (semi-finals)
3. (Chinese Taipei) Wu Hsuan-yi / Yang Chu-yun (final)
4. (Japan) Akira Koga / Yuho Imai (champions)
5. (Thailand) Supak Jomkoh / Ornnicha Jongsathapornparn (quarter-finals)
6. (Chinese Taipei) Lai Po-yu / Lin Xiao-min (first round)
7. (Malaysia) Liew Xun / Ho Lo Ee (first round)
8. (Chinese Taipei) Chou Yu-hsiang / Liao Yuan-chi (quarter-finals)

=== Finals ===
Semi-finals
1	(Malaysia) Jimmy Wong (Malaysia) Lai Pei Jing	16	21	14
3	(Chinese Taipei) Wu Hsuan-yi (Chinese Taipei) Yang Chu-yun	21	17	21
4	(Japan) Akira Koga (Japan) Yuho Imai	21	21
2	(Chinese Taipei) Wu Guan-xun (Chinese Taipei) Lee Chia-hsin	16	17

Final
3	(Chinese Taipei) Wu Hsuan-yi (Chinese Taipei) Yang Chu-yun	21	13	15
4	(Japan) Akira Koga (Japan) Yuho Imai	16	21	21

=== Top half ===
==== Section 1 ====
First round
1	(Malaysia) J Wong (Malaysia) Lai P J	21	21
(Chinese Taipei) Huang J-h (Chinese Taipei) Huang K-x	8	3
(Chinese Taipei) Chen Y-c (Chinese Taipei) Lin W-c	23	9	13
(Chinese Taipei) Cheng K-w (Chinese Taipei) Liu C-y	21	21	21
8	(Chinese Taipei) Chou Y-h (Chinese Taipei) Liao Y-c	17	21	21
Q3	(Chinese Taipei) Chiang C-w (Chinese Taipei) Lin C-c	21	6	11
(Chinese Taipei) Hung B-f (Chinese Taipei) Sung Y-h	21	21
(Chinese Taipei) Chen C (Chinese Taipei) Lin J-y	13	17

Second round
1	(Malaysia) J Wong (Malaysia) Lai P J	21	21
(Chinese Taipei) Cheng K-w (Chinese Taipei) Liu C-y	17	18
8	(Chinese Taipei) Chou Y-h (Chinese Taipei) Liao Y-c	24	21
(Chinese Taipei) Hung B-f (Chinese Taipei) Sung Y-h	22	12

Quarter-finals
1	(Malaysia) J Wong (Malaysia) Lai P J	21	21
8	(Chinese Taipei) Chou Y-h (Chinese Taipei) Liao Y-c	10	19

==== Section 2 ====
First round
3	(Chinese Taipei) Wu H-y (Chinese Taipei) Yang C-y	21	21
(Chinese Taipei) Chiu T-h (Chinese Taipei) Chen Y-t	8	15
(Chinese Taipei) Lu C (Chinese Taipei) Lin Y-y	21	9	22
(Hong Kong) Chan Y C (Hong Kong) Ng T Y	15	21	24
5	(Thailand) S Jomkoh (Thailand) O Jongsathapornparn	21	21
(Thailand) Tonk Saeheng (Thailand) Tonr Saeheng	7	11
(Malaysia) Wee Y T (Malaysia) C San	20	21	21
(Malaysia) Too M Y (Malaysia) Lee Y S	22	12	13

Second round
3	(Chinese Taipei) Wu H-y (Chinese Taipei) Yang C-y	9	21	21
(Hong Kong) Chan Y C (Hong Kong) Ng T Y	21	12	6
5	(Thailand) S Jomkoh (Thailand) O Jongsathapornparn	21	21
(Malaysia) Wee Y T (Malaysia) C San	16	12

Quarter-finals
3	(Chinese Taipei) Wu H-y (Chinese Taipei) Yang C-y	21	21
5	(Thailand) S Jomkoh (Thailand) O Jongsathapornparn	14	12

=== Bottom half ===
==== Section 3 ====
First round
(Chinese Taipei) Wei C-w (Chinese Taipei) Lai Y-j	14	18
(India) N Kumar (India) R Thaker	21	21
(Chinese Taipei) Tsai C-h (Chinese Taipei) Hung H-e	21	21
6	(Chinese Taipei) Lai P-y (Chinese Taipei) Lin X-m	16	19
(Chinese Taipei) Ho W-h (Chinese Taipei) Chen Y-h	22	9
Q2	(Chinese Taipei) Lin S-m (Chinese Taipei) Yang Y-h	24	21
Q1	(Chinese Taipei) Huang T-i (Chinese Taipei) Wang Y-z	15	13
4	(Japan) A Koga (Japan) Y Imai	21	21

Second round
(India) N Kumar (India) R Thaker	24	20
(Chinese Taipei) Tsai C-h (Chinese Taipei) Hung H-e	26	22
Q2	(Chinese Taipei) Lin S-m (Chinese Taipei) Yang Y-h	12	10
4	(Japan) A Koga (Japan) Y Imai	21	21

Quarter-finals
(Chinese Taipei) Tsai C-h (Chinese Taipei) Hung H-e	19	9
4	(Japan) A Koga (Japan) Y Imai	21	21

==== Section 4 ====
First round
PFQ	(Chinese Taipei) Lin T-y (Chinese Taipei) Hung Y-e	21	21
Q4	(Chinese Taipei) Yang P-c (Chinese Taipei) Chan P-h	17	19
(Chinese Taipei) Lu M-c (Chinese Taipei) Chou Y-a	21	29	22
7	(Malaysia) Liew X (Malaysia) Ho L E	18	30	20
(Chinese Taipei) Chen B-y (Chinese Taipei) Sun L-c	21	21
(Chinese Taipei) Chen S-f (Chinese Taipei) Lee C-c	11	11
(India) H Amsakarunan (India) T Jolly	20	21	19
2	(Chinese Taipei) Wu G-x (Chinese Taipei) Lee C-h	22	18	21

Second round
PFQ	(Chinese Taipei) Lin T-y (Chinese Taipei) Hung Y-e	18	16
(Chinese Taipei) Lu M-c (Chinese Taipei) Chou Y-a	21	21
(Chinese Taipei) Chen B-y (Chinese Taipei) Sun L-c	10	16
2	(Chinese Taipei) Wu G-x (Chinese Taipei) Lee C-h	21	21

Quarter-finals
(Chinese Taipei) Lu M-c (Chinese Taipei) Chou Y-a	11	18
2	(Chinese Taipei) Wu G-x (Chinese Taipei) Lee C-h	21	21

Preceded by 2025 China Masters; 2025 Indonesia Masters Super 100 I	BWF World Tour; 2025 BWF season	Succeeded by 2025 Al Ain Masters
