= Kokona Ishikawa =

Japanese badminton player (born 2004)

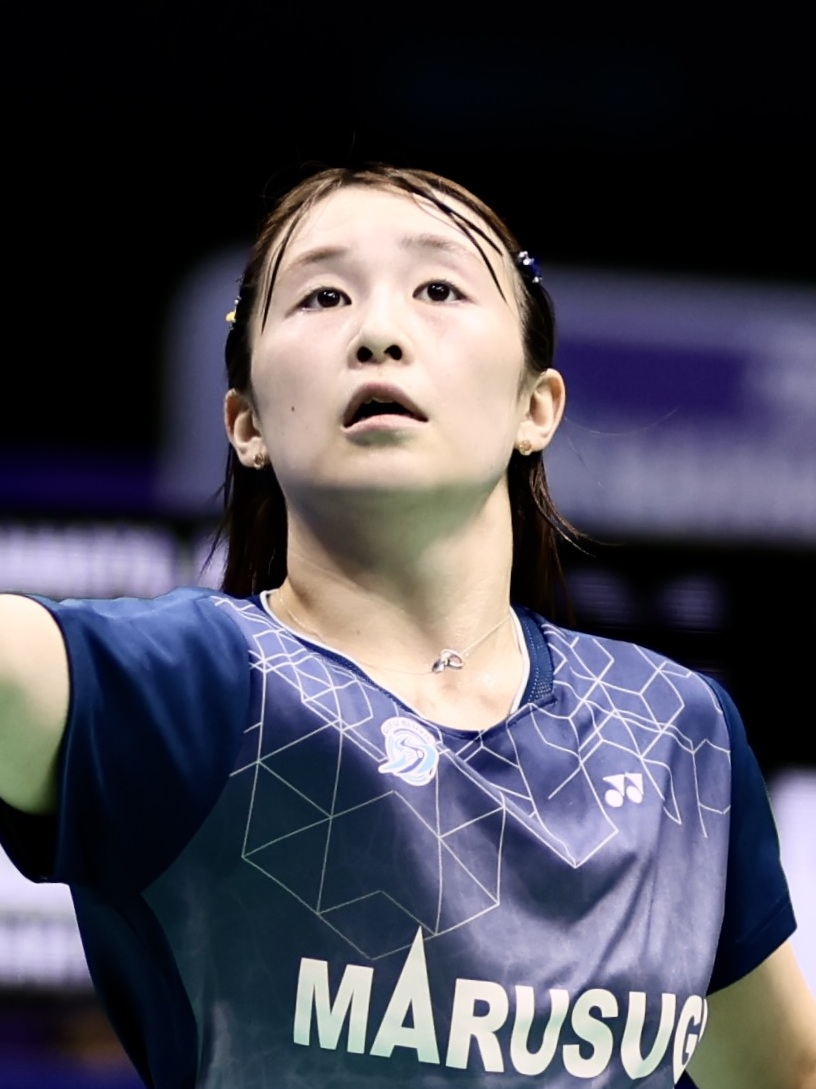
- Ishikawa at the 2025 Kaohsiung Masters

Personal information
- Born: 11 October 2004 (age 22) Tokyo, Japan
- Height: 1.60 m (5 ft 3 in)

Sport
- Country: Japan
- Sport: Badminton
- Handedness: Right
- Coached by: Keiko Yoshitomi; Satoko Suetsuna

Women's & mixed doubles
- Highest ranking: 23 (WD with Ririna Hiramoto, 9 June 2026); 71 (XD with Haruki Kawabe, 17 November 2026)
- Current ranking: 71 (XD with Haruki Kawabe, 17 November 2026)
- BWF profile
Medal record
Women's badminton
Representing Japan
World Junior Championships
Bronze medal – third place	2022 Santander	Girls' doubles
Bronze medal – third place	2022 Santander	Mixed team

Kokona Ishikawa (石川 心菜, Ishikawa Kokona; born 11 October 2004) is a Japanese badminton player who competes in doubles. A bronze medalist in girls' doubles at the 2022 World Junior Championships, she has won a World Tour Super 100 title at the 2025 Kaohsiung Masters. Ishikawa achieved a career-high women's doubles ranking of No. 23. A former member of the Japanese national team, she plays for the Gifu Bluvic badminton team.

== Early career ==
Born in Tokyo, Ishikawa attended Aomori Yamada Junior and Senior High Schools, where she won several national titles. In 2021, she and Hina Osawa won the girls' doubles title at the National High School Invitational Tournament, for which they received the All Japan High School Athletic Federation's Excellent Player Award. She also won the All Japan Junior Open doubles with Miyu Ogasawara.

The following year, she partnered with Riko Kiyose to win the girls' doubles title at the National High School Championships (Inter-High). As team captain, she also led Aomori Yamada to a second consecutive victory in the girls' team event at the National Sports Festival. For these achievements, Ishikawa and Kiyose were presented with the 17th Tō-Ō Nippō Sports Award.

On the international junior circuit in 2022, Ishikawa won the girls' singles title at the Malaysia Junior International, defeating compatriot Tomoka Miyazaki in the final. She won two bronze medals at the 2022 World Junior Championships, in the mixed team event and in girls' doubles with Kiyose. The pair was defeated in the semifinals by the eventual champions, Liu Shengshu and Wang Tingge of China. At her high school graduation on 1 March 2023, Ishikawa received the school's Chairman's Special Award. She joined the NTT East badminton team in April 2023.

== Career ==
=== 2023–2024: Senior debut and first international title ===
Ishikawa partnered with Mio Konegawa from 2023 to 2024, and the pair was selected for the 2024 Japanese national team. With Konegawa, she won her first senior international title at the 2024 Saipan International. The pair also finished as runners-up at four tournaments: the 2023 Thailand International, the 2023 Bahrain International, the 2024 Vietnam International, and the 2024 Denmark Challenge. They achieved a career-high women's doubles ranking of No. 35 on 10 December 2024.

=== 2025: First World Tour title ===
In 2025, Ishikawa transferred to the Gifu Bluvic badminton team and formed a new partnership with Ririna Hiramoto. The duo won the Northern Marianas Open in August; at the same tournament, Ishikawa finished as the mixed doubles runner-up with Haruki Kawabe. Later that year, Ishikawa and Hiramoto secured their first BWF World Tour title at the Super 100 Kaohsiung Masters in September. They also finished as runners-up at the Super 100 Indonesia Masters I and reached the semifinals of the Indonesia Masters II. The pair concluded the 2025 season with a semifinal appearance at the Super 500 Australian Open.

=== 2026 ===
Ishikawa and Hiramoto opened the season with their Super 1000 debut at the Malaysia Open. The pair advanced to the quarter-finals, where they were defeated by the eventual champions, Liu Shengshu and Tan Ning. Ishikawa achieved a career-high world ranking of 23 on 9 June. In April, she made her Asian Championships debut in Ningbo, China, partnering with Haruki Kawabe in mixed doubles. They were eliminated in the first round by the reigning world champions, Chen Tang Jie and Toh Ee Wei. At the Canada Open, Ishikawa and Kawabe reached the quarterfinals, where they lost to eventual champions Akira Koga and Natsu Saito. At the Korea Masters, Ishikawa and Kawabe reached the semifinals, where they lost to reigning Asian champions Kim Jae-hyeon and Jang Ha-jeong. On 4 September, the Badminton Association of Japan accepted Ishikawa and Hiramoto’s request to withdraw from the U24 national team following their decision to dissolve their partnership.

== Achievements ==
=== World Junior Championships ===
Girls' doubles
Year	Venue	Partner	Opponent	Score	Result	Ref.
2022	Palacio de Deportes de Santander; Santander, Spain	(Japan) Riko Kiyose	(China) Liu Shengshu (China) Wang Tingge	21–17, 13–21, 17–21	Bronze	

=== BWF World Tour (1 title, 1 runner-up) ===
The BWF World Tour, which was announced on 19 March 2017 and implemented in 2018, is a series of elite badminton tournaments sanctioned by the Badminton World Federation (BWF). The BWF World Tour is divided into levels of World Tour Finals, Super 1000, Super 750, Super 500, Super 300, and the BWF Tour Super 100.

Women's doubles
Year	Tournament	Level	Partner	Opponent	Score	Result	Ref.
2025	Indonesia Masters	Super 100	(Japan) Ririna Hiramoto	(Chinese Taipei) Lin Xiao-min (Chinese Taipei) Wang Yu-qiao	17–21, 9–21	(silver) Runner-up	
2025	Kaohsiung Masters	Super 100	(Japan) Ririna Hiramoto	(Japan) Hinata Suzuki (Japan) Nao Yamakita	21–16, 21–17	(gold) Winner	

=== BWF International Challenge/Series (2 titles, 5 runners-up) ===
Women's doubles
Year	Tournament	Partner	Opponent	Score	Result	Ref.
2023	Thailand International	(Japan) Mio Konegawa	(South Korea) Kim Yu-jung (South Korea) Lee Yeon-woo	19–21, 11–21	(silver) Runner-up	
2023	Bahrain International	(Japan) Mio Konegawa	(Bulgaria) Gabriela Stoeva (Bulgaria) Stefani Stoeva	19–21, 14–21	(silver) Runner-up	
2024	Vietnam International	(Japan) Mio Konegawa	(Thailand) Laksika Kanlaha (Thailand) Phataimas Muenwong	19–21, 14–21	(silver) Runner-up	
2024	Denmark Challenge	(Japan) Mio Konegawa	(Thailand) Laksika Kanlaha (Thailand) Phataimas Muenwong	16–21, 18–21	(silver) Runner-up	
2024	Saipan International	(Japan) Mio Konegawa	(South Korea) Kim Hye-jeong (South Korea) Kim Yu-jung	21–19, 11–21, 21–18	(gold) Winner	
2025	Northern Marianas Open	(Japan) Ririna Hiramoto	(Japan) Hinata Suzuki (Japan) Nao Yamakita	21–17, 21–15	(gold) Winner	

Mixed doubles
Year	Tournament	Partner	Opponent	Score	Result	Ref.
2025	Northern Marianas Open	(Japan) Haruki Kawabe	(Japan) Akira Koga (Japan) Yuho Imai	19–21, 13–21	(silver) Runner-up	

BWF International Challenge tournament
BWF International Series tournament

=== BWF Junior International (1 title) ===
Girls' singles
Year	Tournament	Opponent	Score	Result	Ref.
2022	Malaysia Junior International	(Japan) Tomoka Miyazaki	21–17, 17–21, 24–22	(gold) Winner	

BWF Junior International Series tournament

== Performance timeline ==
Key

W	Won	F	Finalist	SF	Semi-finalist
QF	Quarter-finalist	#R	Rounds 4, 3, 2, 1	RR	Round-robin stage
Q#	Qualification round	A	Absent	w/d	Withdrew
G	Gold	S	Silver	B	Bronze
NH	Not held	N/A	Not applicable	DNQ	Did not qualify

=== National team ===
Junior level

Team events	2022	Ref.
World Junior Championships	B	

=== Individual competitions ===
==== Junior level ====
Girls' doubles

Events	2022	Ref.
World Junior Championships	B	

==== Senior level ====
===== Women's doubles =====
Tournament	BWF World Tour			Best	Ref.
Tournament	2024	2025	2026	Best	Ref.
Malaysia Open	A		QF	QF ('26)	
India Open	A		1R	1R ('26)	
Thailand Masters	A		2R	2R ('26)	
All England Open	A		1R	1R ('26)	
Ruichang China Masters	SF	2R	2R	SF ('24)	
Baoji China Masters	SF	A		SF ('24)	
Singapore Open	A		2R	2R ('26)	
Indonesia Open	A		2R	2R ('26)	
Australian Open	A	SF	A	SF ('25)	
Macau Open	A	Q1	A	Q1 ('25)	
U.S. Open	A		1R	1R ('26)	
Canada Open	A		QF	QF ('26)	
Japan Open	1R	2R	1R	2R ('25)	
China Open	A		1R	1R ('26)	
Taipei Open	A		2R	2R ('26)	
Korea Masters	A	2R	2R	2R ('25, '26)	
China Masters	2R	A		2R ('24)	
Indonesia Masters Super 100	A	F	A	F ('25)	
Indonesia Masters Super 100	A	SF	A	F ('25)	
Denmark Open	1R	A	2R	2R ('26)	
Korea Open	2R	A		2R ('24)	
Kaohsiung Masters	A	W	A	W ('25)	
Japan Masters	1R	1R	1R	1R ('24, '25, '26)	
Year-end ranking	35	37		35	
Tournament	2024	2025	2026	Best	Ref.

===== Mixed doubles =====
Event	2026	Ref.
Asian Championships	1R	

Tournament	BWF World Tour		Best	Ref.
Tournament	2025	2026	Best	Ref.
Canada Open	A	QF	QF ('26)	
Taipei Open	A	QF	QF ('26)	
Korea Masters	A	SF	SF ('26)	
Korea Open	A	2R	2R ('26)	
Japan Masters	1R	2R	2R ('26)	
Hong Kong Open	A	1R	1R ('26)	
Year-end ranking	135		135	
Tournament	2025	2026	Best	Ref.

== Wins over top-10 ranked pairs ==
Wins over pairs who were ranked in the world's top 10 at the time the match was played.

=== Mixed doubles ===
#	Partner	Opponent	Rk	Tournament	Rd	Score	Rk	Ref.
1	(Japan) Haruki Kawabe	(Chinese Taipei) Yang Po-hsuan (Chinese Taipei) Hu Ling-fang	10	2026 Japan Masters	1R	15–21, 21–14, 21–19	75	

=== Women's doubles ===
#	Partner	Opponent	Rk	Tournament	Rd	Score	Rk	Ref.
1	(Japan) Ririna Hiramoto	(Chinese Taipei) Hsieh Pei-shan (Chinese Taipei) Hung En-tzu	9	2026 Malaysia Open	2R	21–14, 15–21, 21–18	37	

== Record against selected opponents ==
Record against year-end Finals finalists, World Championships semi-finalists, and Olympic quarter-finalists. Accurate as of 5 November 2026.

=== Haruki Kawabe ===
Players	M	W	L	Diff.
(China) Jiang Zhenbang & Wei Yaxin	1	0	1	–1
(Malaysia) Chen Tang Jie & Toh Ee Wei	1	0	1	–1

=== Ririna Hiramoto ===
Players	M	W	L	Diff.
(China) Liu Shengshu & Tan Ning	1	0	1	–1
(Indonesia) Apriyani Rahayu & Siti Fadia Silva Ramadhanti	1	0	1	–1
(South Korea) Baek Ha-na & Lee So-hee	1	0	1	–1

=== Maiko Kawazoe ===
Players	M	W	L	Diff.
(China) Liu Shengshu & Tan Ning	1	0	1	–1
