= Saipan International (badminton) =

International badminton tournament

The Saipan International is an international badminton tournament held in Saipan, Commonwealth of the Northern Mariana Islands. The event is part of the Badminton World Federation's International Challenge and part of the Badminton Oceania circuit. It held for the first time in 2023.

== List of winners ==
| Year | Men's singles | Women's singles | Men's doubles | Women's doubles | Mixed doubles | Ref |
|---|---|---|---|---|---|---|
| 2023 | (Japan) Takuma Obayashi | (Japan) Tomoka Miyazaki | (Chinese Taipei) Lee Fang-chih (Chinese Taipei) Lee Fang-jen | (Chinese Taipei) Hsu Ya-ching (Chinese Taipei) Lin Wan-ching | (United States) Presley Smith (United States) Allison Lee | |
| 2024 | (Malaysia) Justin Hoh | (Japan) Riko Gunji | (Japan) Takumi Nomura (Japan) Yuichi Shimogami | (Japan) Kokona Ishikawa (Japan) Mio Konegawa | (Japan) Hiroki Nishi (Japan) Akari Sato | |
| 2025 | (Japan) Riki Takei | (India) Tanya Hemanth | (Japan) Naoya Kawashima (Japan) Akira Koga | (Japan) Hinata Suzuki (Japan) Nao Yamakita | (South Korea) An Yun-seong (South Korea) Lee Yu-lim | |
| 2026 | (Japan) Shogo Ogawa | (Japan) Sakura Masuki | (Chinese Taipei) Wei Chun-wei (Chinese Taipei) Yang Po-chih | (Japan) Mio Konegawa (Japan) An Uesugi | (South Korea) Cho Song-hyun (South Korea) Jeong Na-eun | |

== Performances by nation ==
As of 2026 edition

| No | Nation | MS | WS | MD | WD | XD | Total |
|---|---|---|---|---|---|---|---|
| 1 | Japan | 3 | 3 | 2 | 3 | 1 | 12 |
| 2 | Chinese Taipei | | | 2 | 1 | | 3 |
| 3 | South Korea | | | | | 2 | 2 |
| 4 | India | | 1 | | | | 1 |
| 4 | Malaysia | 1 | | | | | 1 |
| 4 | United States* | | | | | 1 | 1 |
| Total | | 4 | 4 | 4 | 4 | 4 | 20 |

* Host nation
