= Maya Taguchi =

Japanese badminton player (born 2005)

Personal information
- Born: 9 October 2005 (age 21) Hyūga, Miyazaki Prefecture, Japan
- Height: 1.65 m (5 ft 5 in)

Sport
- Country: Japan
- Sport: Badminton
- Handedness: Left
- Coached by: Hajime Komiyama

Women's & mixed doubles
- Highest ranking: 10 (XD with Yuta Watanabe, 17 November 2026); 120 (WD with Akari Sato, 29 October 2024)
- Current ranking: 10 (XD with Yuta Watanabe, 17 November 2026)
- BWF profile
Medal record
Women's badminton
Representing Japan
Asian Games
Silver medal – second place	2026 Aichi–Nagoya	Women's team
Asian Championships
Bronze medal – third place	2026 Ningbo	Mixed doubles
World Junior Championships
Gold medal – first place	2023 Spokane	Girls' doubles
Bronze medal – third place	2022 Santander	Mixed team
Asian Junior Championships
Gold medal – first place	2023 Yogyakarta	Mixed team
Bronze medal – third place	2023 Yogyakarta	Girls' doubles

Maya Taguchi (田口 真彩, Taguchi Maya; born 9 October 2005) is a Japanese badminton player. A left-handed player, she is the 2023 BWF World Junior Champion in the girls' doubles event. In her senior career, Taguchi won her first BWF World Tour title at the 2025 Malaysia Super 100 in the mixed doubles. She graduated from Yanai Commercial & Technical High School and joined the ACT SAIKYO badminton team on 1 April 2024.

== Achievements ==
=== Asian Championships ===
Mixed doubles
Year	Venue	Partner	Opponent	Score	Result	Ref.
2026	Ningbo Olympic Sports Center Gymnasium, Ningbo, China	(Japan) Yuta Watanabe	(South Korea) Kim Jae-hyeon (South Korea) Jang Ha-jeong	18–21, 11–21	Bronze	

=== World Junior Championships ===
Girls' doubles
Year	Venue	Partner	Opponent	Score	Result	Ref.
2023	The Podium, Spokane, United States	(Japan) Aya Tamaki	(United States) Francesca Corbett (United States) Allison Lee	12–21, 21–13, 21–15	Gold	

=== Asian Junior Championships ===
Girls' doubles
Year	Venue	Partner	Opponent	Score	Result	Ref.
2023	Among Rogo Sports Hall, Yogyakarta, Indonesia	(Japan) Aya Tamaki	(Japan) Mei Sudo (Japan) Nao Yamakita	16–21, 25–27	Bronze	

=== BWF World Tour (3 titles) ===
The BWF World Tour, which was announced on 19 March 2017 and implemented in 2018, is a series of elite badminton tournaments sanctioned by the Badminton World Federation (BWF). The BWF World Tour is divided into levels of World Tour Finals, Super 1000, Super 750, Super 500, Super 300, and the BWF Tour Super 100.

Mixed doubles
Year	Tournament	Level	Partner	Opponent	Score	Result	Ref.
2025	Malaysia Super 100	Super 100	(Japan) Yuta Watanabe	(Indonesia) Dejan Ferdinansyah (Indonesia) Bernadine Wardana	21–18, 21–12	(gold) Winner	
2026	Taipei Open	Super 300	(Japan) Yuta Watanabe	(Chinese Taipei) Yang Po-hsuan (Chinese Taipei) Hu Ling-fang	21–19, 21–8	(gold) Winner	
2026	Korea Masters	Super 300	(Japan) Yuta Watanabe	(South Korea) Kim Jae-hyeon (South Korea) Jang Ha-jeong	21–19, 21–14	(gold) Winner	

=== BWF International Challenge/Series (4 titles, 2 runners-up) ===
Women's doubles
Year	Tournament	Partner	Opponent	Score	Result	Ref.
2023	Guatemala Future Series	(Japan) Tomoka Miyazaki	(Japan) Mei Sudo (Japan) Nao Yamakita	21–16, 14–21, 23–25	(silver) Runner-up	
2023 (I)	India International	(Japan) Miku Shigeta	(India) Priya Konjengbam (India) Shruti Mishra	17–21, 21–18, 21–15	(gold) Winner	

Mixed doubles
Year	Tournament	Partner	Opponent	Score	Result	Ref.
2023	Guatemala Future Series	(Japan) Daigo Tanioka	(Japan) Kenta Matsukawa (Japan) Nao Yamakita	21–18, 21–19	(gold) Winner	
2025	Sri Lanka International	(Japan) Yuta Watanabe	(Indonesia) Bobby Setiabudi (Indonesia) Melati Daeva Oktavianti	21–16, 14–21, 18–21	(silver) Runner-up	
2025	Sri Lanka International	(Japan) Yuta Watanabe	(Thailand) Ratchapol Makkasasithorn (Thailand) Nattamon Laisuan	21–15, 21–16	(gold) Winner	
2026	Singapore International	(Japan) Yuta Watanabe	(Hong Kong) Chan Yin Chak (Hong Kong) Ng Tsz Yau	21–15, 21–13	(gold) Winner	

BWF International Challenge tournament
BWF International Series tournament
BWF Future Series tournament

=== BWF Junior International (2 titles, 3 runners-up) ===
Girls' doubles
Year	Tournament	Partner	Opponent	Score	Result	Ref.
2022	Croatia Junior Open	(Japan) Nao Yamakita	(Japan) Rui Kiyama (Japan) Kanano Muroya	19–21, 19–21	(silver) Runner-up	
2022	Bulgaria Junior Open	(Japan) Nao Yamakita	(Japan) Rui Kiyama (Japan) Kanano Muroya	14–21, 21–19, 17–21	(silver) Runner-up	
2022	Malaysia Junior International	(Japan) Nao Yamakita	(Japan) Rui Kiyama (Japan) Kanano Muroya	19–21, 17–21	(silver) Runner-up	

Mixed doubles
Year	Tournament	Partner	Opponent	Score	Result	Ref.
2022	Croatia Junior Open	(Japan) Daigo Tanioka	(Japan) Shunya Ota (Japan) Kanano Muroya	21–12, 16–21, 21–11	(gold) Winner	
2022	Bulgaria Junior Open	(Japan) Daigo Tanioka	(Japan) Shunya Ota (Japan) Kanano Muroya	21–18, 21–16	(gold) Winner	

BWF Junior International Challenge tournament
BWF Junior International Series tournament
