= Kaohsiung Masters =

Annual badminton tournament held in Taiwan

- Official website
- Founded: 2023; 3 years ago
- Editions: 4 (2026)
- Location: Kaohsiung; Taiwan
- Venue: Kaohsiung Arena (2026)
- Prize money: US$120,000 (2026)

Men's
- Draw: 48S / 32D
- Current champions: Kuo Kuan-lin (singles); Chang Ko-chi; Lu Chen (doubles)
- Most singles titles: 1, all winners
- Most doubles titles: 2, Chang Ko-chi

Women's
- Draw: 32S / 32D
- Current champions: Liao Yuan-chi (singles); Isyana Syahira Meida; Rinjani Kwinnara Nastine (doubles)
- Most singles titles: 1, all winners
- Most doubles titles: 1, all winners

Mixed doubles
- Draw: 32
- Current champions: Wee Yee Hern; Vannee Gobi
- Most titles (male): 1, all winners
- Most titles (female): 1, all winners

Super 100
- Al Ain Masters; Akita Masters (2018–2019); Baoji China Masters; Dutch Open (2018–2019); Hyderabad Open (2018–2019); Indonesia Masters Super 100; Kaohsiung Masters; Malaysia Super 100; Guwahati Masters; Odisha Masters; Ruichang China Masters; Russian Open (2018–2019); Scottish Open (2018); Vietnam Open

Last completed
- 2026 Kaohsiung Masters

The Kaohsiung Masters (Chinese: 高雄羽球大師賽) is an annual badminton tournament held in Taiwan. The tournament is a part of the BWF World Tour tournaments and is leveled at BWF Tour Super 100. The inaugural edition was held in 2023 at the Kaohsiung Arena in Kaohsiung, Taiwan.

== Winners ==
Year	Men's singles	Women's singles	Men's doubles	Women's doubles	Mixed doubles
2023	(Chinese Taipei) Lin Chun-yi	(Chinese Taipei) Liang Ting-yu	(Malaysia) Goh Sze Fei (Malaysia) Nur Izzuddin	(Australia) Setyana Mapasa (Australia) Angela Yu	(Japan) Hiroki Nishi (Japan) Akari Sato
2024	(Chinese Taipei) Lee Chia-hao	(Chinese Taipei) Hsu Wen-chi	(Chinese Taipei) Chang Ko-chi (Chinese Taipei) Chen Xin-yuan	(Indonesia) Jesita Putri Miantoro (Indonesia) Febi Setianingrum	(Thailand) Ruttanapak Oupthong (Thailand) Jhenicha Sudjaipraparat
2025	(Chinese Taipei) Wang Po-wei	(Japan) Nozomi Okuhara	(Japan) Kakeru Kumagai (Japan) Hiroki Nishi	(Japan) Ririna Hiramoto (Japan) Kokona Ishikawa	(Japan) Akira Koga (Japan) Yuho Imai
2026	(Chinese Taipei) Kuo Kuan-lin	(Chinese Taipei) Liao Yuan-chi	(Chinese Taipei) Chang Ko-chi (Chinese Taipei) Lu Chen	(Indonesia) Isyana Syahira Meida (Indonesia) Rinjani Kwinnara Nastine	(Malaysia) Wee Yee Hern (Malaysia) Vannee Gobi

== Performances by nation ==
As of the 2026 edition

Pos.	Nation	MS	WS	MD	WD	XD	Total
1	Chinese Taipei*	4	3	2			9
2	Japan		1	1	1	2	5
3	Indonesia				2		2
3	Malaysia			1		1	2
5	Australia				1		1
5	Thailand					1	1
Total		4	4	4	4	4	20

* Host nation

== See also ==
- List of sporting events in Taiwan
- Taipei Open
- Chinese Taipei Masters, defunct
- Kaohsiung International, defunct
- Chinese Taipei International, defunct
