= 2023 Badminton Asia Junior Championships =

Tournament details
- Dates: 7–16 July 2023
- Edition: 23
- Level: International
- Venue: Among Rogo Sports Hall
- Location: Yogyakarta, Indonesia

The 2023 Badminton Asia Junior Championships (officially known as BNI Badminton Asia Junior Championships 2023) was the 23rd edition of the Asia continental junior championships to crown the best U-19 badminton players across Asia. This tournament is held in Among Rogo Sports Hall, Yogyakarta, Indonesia, between 7 and 16 July 2023.

== Tournament ==
The 2023 Badminton Asia Junior Championships was organized by the Badminton Association of Indonesia, sanctioned by Badminton Asia. This tournament consists of team and individual events. There were 14 teams competing in the mixed team event, which was held from 7–11 July, while the individual events were held from 12 to 16 July.

=== Venue ===
This tournament is held at Among Rogo Sports Hall, Yogyakarta, Indonesia.

== Medal summary ==
=== Medalists ===
Event	Gold	Silver	Bronze
Teams	Japan; Kosuke Kakuta; Kenta Matsukawa; Yuna Nakagawa; Yuto Nakashizu; Yudai Okimoto; Rui Sato; Kaito Sugawara; Daigo Tanioka; Kazuma Kawano; Shuji Sawada; Aya Tamaki; Mihane Endo; Niina Matsuta; Ririna Hiramoto; Riko Kiyose; Miku Kohara; Tomoka Miyazaki; Mei Sudo; Maya Taguchi; Nao Yamakita	Indonesia; Muhammad Reza Al Fajri; Alwi Farhan; Muhammad Al Farizi; Dexter Farrell; Jonathan Farrell Gosal; Nikolaus Joaquin; Wahyu Agung Prasetyo; Adrian Pratama; Priskila Venus Elsadai; Meisa Rizka Fitria; Anisanaya Kamila; Felisha Pasaribu; Mutiara Ayu Puspitasari; Maulida Aprilia Putri; Az Zahra Ditya Ramadhani; Ruzana	Thailand; Phuwanat Horbanluekit; Tanakorn Meechai; Nachakorn Pusri; Songpon Sae-ma; Phurinath Saikamma; Nontakorn Thong-on; Wongsup Wongsup-in; Thanadol Yunmongkol; Fungfa Korpthammakit; Hathaithip Mijad; Huzwaney Momin; Sirada Roongpiboonsopit; Saranporn Sombutwatthananukool; Patida Srisawat
Teams	Japan; Kosuke Kakuta; Kenta Matsukawa; Yuna Nakagawa; Yuto Nakashizu; Yudai Okimoto; Rui Sato; Kaito Sugawara; Daigo Tanioka; Kazuma Kawano; Shuji Sawada; Aya Tamaki; Mihane Endo; Niina Matsuta; Ririna Hiramoto; Riko Kiyose; Miku Kohara; Tomoka Miyazaki; Mei Sudo; Maya Taguchi; Nao Yamakita	Indonesia; Muhammad Reza Al Fajri; Alwi Farhan; Muhammad Al Farizi; Dexter Farrell; Jonathan Farrell Gosal; Nikolaus Joaquin; Wahyu Agung Prasetyo; Adrian Pratama; Priskila Venus Elsadai; Meisa Rizka Fitria; Anisanaya Kamila; Felisha Pasaribu; Mutiara Ayu Puspitasari; Maulida Aprilia Putri; Az Zahra Ditya Ramadhani; Ruzana	Chinese Taipei; Bao Xin Da Gu La Wai; Huang Jui-hsuan; Lai Po-yu; Lin Yu-cheng; Liu Yi; Ma Cheng-yi; Tsai Cheng-ying; Tsai Fu-cheng; Du Yi-chen; Hsieh Yi-en; Lin Yu-hao; Peng Yu-wei; Wang Pei-yu; Wang Yu-si; Yang Chia-chi; Yang Chu-yun
Boys' singles	(China) Hu Zhe'an	(Japan) Yudai Okimoto	(Indonesia) Alwi Farhan
Boys' singles	(China) Hu Zhe'an	(Japan) Yudai Okimoto	(China) Wang Zijun
Girls' singles	(Indonesia) Mutiara Ayu Puspitasari	(South Korea) Kim Min-ji	(China) Xu Wenjing
Girls' singles	(Indonesia) Mutiara Ayu Puspitasari	(South Korea) Kim Min-ji	(China) Shou Qunyu
Boys' doubles	(China) Ma Shang (China) Zhu Yijun	(China) Chen Yongrui (China) Hu Keyuan	(Indonesia) Zidane Attauba Efendi (Indonesia) Kleopas Binar Putra Prakoso
Boys' doubles	(China) Ma Shang (China) Zhu Yijun	(China) Chen Yongrui (China) Hu Keyuan	(Chinese Taipei) Lai Po-yu (Chinese Taipei) Tsai Fu-cheng
Girls' doubles	(Japan) Mei Sudo (Japan) Nao Yamakita	(South Korea) Park Seul (South Korea) Yeon Seo-yeon	(Japan) Maya Taguchi (Japan) Aya Tamaki
Girls' doubles	(Japan) Mei Sudo (Japan) Nao Yamakita	(South Korea) Park Seul (South Korea) Yeon Seo-yeon	(China) Li Huazhou (China) Zhang Yuhan
Mixed doubles	(China) Zhu Yijun (China) Huang Kexin	(China) Liao Pinyi (China) Zhang Jiahan	(South Korea) Lee Min-wook (South Korea) Cheon Hye-in
Mixed doubles	(China) Zhu Yijun (China) Huang Kexin	(China) Liao Pinyi (China) Zhang Jiahan	(South Korea) Park Beom-soo (South Korea) Yeon Seo-yeon

=== Medal table ===
* Host nation (Indonesia)

Rank	Nation	Gold	Silver	Bronze	Total
1	China	3	2	4	9
2	Japan	2	1	1	4
3	Indonesia*	1	1	2	4
4	South Korea	0	2	2	4
5	Chinese Taipei	0	0	2	2
6	Thailand	0	0	1	1
Totals (6 entries)		6	6	12	24
