= Among Rogo Sports Hall =

Multifunction sports arena in Special Region of Yogyakarta, Indonesia

- Gelanggang Olahraga Among Rogo

- Location in Yogyakarta
- Location: Semaki, Umbulharjo, Yogyakarta, Special Region of Yogyakarta, Indonesia
- Coordinates: 7°47′53″S 110°23′07″E
- Capacity: 5,000
- Public transit: Trans Jogja: 2A, 2B (GOR Among Rogo)

Among Rogo Sports Hall (Indonesian: Gelanggang Olahraga Among Rogo) is a multifunction sports arena in Semaki, Umbulharjo, Yogyakarta, Special Region of Yogyakarta, Indonesia. This arena can be used for basketball, badminton, volleyball, futsal, and taekwondo venues.

== Notable international sporting events ==
Among Rogo Sports Hall

- Yonex Sunrise Indonesia Open 2013
- 2017 BWF World Junior Championships
- Kapal Api Indonesia International Series 2022
- Mansion Sport Indonesia International Challenge 2022
- 2023 Badminton Asia Junior Championships
- 2024 Badminton Asia Junior Championships
