= 2022 BWF World Junior Championships – Girls' doubles =

Tournament details
- Dates: 24 October 2022 – 30 October 2022
- Edition: 22nd
- Level: International
- Venue: Palacio de Deportes de Santander
- Location: Santander, Spain

The girls' doubles of the tournament 2022 BWF World Junior Championships is an individual badminton tournament to crowned the best girls' doubles under 19 pair across the BWF associate members around the world. Players will compete to win the Eye Level Cup presented by the former BWF President and chairman of the World Youth Culture Foundation, Kang Young Joong. The tournament will be held from 24 to 30 October 2022 in the Palacio de Deportes de Santander, Spain. The defending champions are Lin Fangling and Zhou Xinru from China, but they were not eligible to participate this year.

== Seeds ==
Click on the seed number of a player to go to their draw section.

1. (Indonesia) Meilysa Trias Puspita Sari / Rachel Allessya Rose (final)
2. (Spain) Nikol Carulla / Lucía Rodríguez (second round)
3. (England) Lisa Curtin / Estelle van Leeuwen (fourth round)
4. (France) Malya Hoareau / Camille Pognante (quarter-finals)
5. (Switzerland) Lucie Amiguet / Vera Appenzeller (third round)
6. (Indonesia) Anisanaya Kamila / Az Zahra Ditya Ramadhani (fourth round)
7. (France) Émilie Drouin / Téa Margueritte (fourth round)
8. (Czech Republic) Lucie Krulová / Petra Maixnerová (third round)

9. (Peru) Fernanda Munar / Rafaela Munar (second round)
10. (Bulgaria) Mihaela Chepisheva / Tsvetina Popivanova (second round)
11. (Germany) Julia Meyer / Cara Siebrecht (fourth round)
12. (Netherlands) Kirsten de Wit / Meerte Loos (second round)
13. (Czech Republic) Kateřina Koliášová / Kateřina Osladilová (third round)
14. (Portugal) Madalena Fortunato / Beatriz Roberto (second round)
15. (Japan) Rui Kiyama / Kanano Muroya (semi-finals)
16. (Indonesia) Arlya Nabila Thesa Munggaran / Agnia Sri Rahayu (fourth round)

== Draw ==
=== Finals ===
Quarter-finals
1	(Indonesia) Meilysa Trias Puspita Sari (Indonesia) Rachel Allessya Rose	21	21
(South Korea) Kim Ye-ri (South Korea) Ko Hee-joo	13	13
15	(Japan) Rui Kiyama (Japan) Kanano Muroya	21	18	21
(Chinese Taipei) Nicole Gonzalez Chan (Chinese Taipei) Yang Chu-yun	16	21	17
(Japan) Kokona Ishikawa (Japan) Riko Kiyose	21	21
4	(France) Malya Hoareau (France) Camille Pognante	19	18
(Thailand) Puttita Phanthui (Thailand) Patida Srisawat	15	13
(China) Liu Shengshu (China) Wang Tingge	21	21

Semi-finals
1	(Indonesia) Meilysa Trias Puspita Sari (Indonesia) Rachel Allessya Rose	12	21	21
15	(Japan) Rui Kiyama (Japan) Kanano Muroya	21	19	14
(Japan) Kokona Ishikawa (Japan) Riko Kiyose	21	13	17
(China) Liu Shengshu (China) Wang Tingge	17	21	21

Final
1	(Indonesia) Meilysa Trias Puspita Sari (Indonesia) Rachel Allessya Rose	14	16
(China) Liu Shengshu (China) Wang Tingge	21	21

=== Top half ===
==== Section 1 ====
First round
(Slovakia) O Kadlecova (Slovakia) L Vybochova	15	18
(Singapore) Chia X Y (Singapore) Heng X E	21	21

Second round
1	(Indonesia) M T Puspita Sari (Indonesia) R A Rose	21	21
(Ukraine) V Frolova (Ukraine) S Lavrova	11	13
(United States) C Ho (United States) E Lin	21	21
(Hong Kong) Chan W L (Hong Kong) A Liu H K	12	7
11	(Germany) J Meyer (Germany) C Siebrecht	21	21
(Estonia) E Berik (Estonia) E Pärsim	13	7
(Egypt) J Abdelkader (Egypt) G Elwazery	6	15
(Singapore) Chia X Y (Singapore) Heng X E	21	21

Third round
1	(Indonesia) M T Puspita Sari (Indonesia) R A Rose	21	22
(United States) C Ho (United States) E Lin	9	20
11	(Germany) J Meyer (Germany) C Siebrecht	21	18	21
(Singapore) Chia X Y (Singapore) Heng X E	19	21	19

Fourth round
1	(Indonesia) M T Puspita Sari (Indonesia) R A Rose	21	21
11	(Germany) J Meyer (Germany) C Siebrecht	13	14

==== Section 2 ====
First round
(Malaysia) V Gobi (Malaysia) Lee X J	19	21	21
(Thailand) T Klomyong (Thailand) S Pirabran	21	17	17

Second round
8	(Czech Republic) L Krulová (Czech Republic) P Maixnerová	21	16	21
(Canada) J Cheng (Canada) S Nong	15	21	17
(Peru) T Kasianov (Peru) N Miyahira	5	7
(South Korea) Kim Y-r (South Korea) Ko H-j	21	21
16	(Indonesia) A N T Munggaran (Indonesia) A S Rahayu	22	21
(China) Li HZ (China) Liao LX	20	14
(Hungary) P Hart (Hungary) N S Vetor	14	13
(Malaysia) V Gobi (Malaysia) Lee X J	21	21

Third round
8	(Czech Republic) L Krulová (Czech Republic) P Maixnerová	20	6
(South Korea) Kim Y-r (South Korea) Ko H-j	22	21
16	(Indonesia) A N T Munggaran (Indonesia) A S Rahayu	21	21
(Malaysia) V Gobi (Malaysia) Lee X J	14	13

Fourth round
(South Korea) Kim Y-r (South Korea) Ko H-j	22	16	21
16	(Indonesia) A N T Munggaran (Indonesia) A S Rahayu	20	21	16

==== Section 3 ====
First round
(Australia) D Nugroho (Australia) C Tan	19	13
(Slovenia) S Alič (Slovenia) Anja Jordan	21	21

Second round
3	(England) L Curtin (England) E van Leeuwen	21	21
(Spain) A Caballero (Spain) E Payá	11	18
(China) Luo Y (China) Wang Y D	21	21
(French Polynesia) H Curet (French Polynesia) M Gaillard	6	8
15	(Japan) R Kiyama (Japan) K Muroya	21	21
(Latvia) A Kupča (Latvia) A Rulle-Titava	5	7
(Sri Lanka) V Jayawardana (Sri Lanka) R Liyanage	20	21	25
(Slovenia) S Alič (Slovenia) Anja Jordan	22	19	23

Third round
3	(England) L Curtin (England) E van Leeuwen	21	15	21
(China) Luo Y (China) Wang Y D	18	21	16
15	(Japan) R Kiyama (Japan) K Muroya	21	21
(Sri Lanka) V Jayawardana (Sri Lanka) R Liyanage	10	7

Fourth round
3	(England) L Curtin (England) E van Leeuwen	18	24	13
15	(Japan) R Kiyama (Japan) K Muroya	21	22	21

==== Section 4 ====
First round
(Belgium) A Boonen (Belgium) T van Wonterghem	22	16	23
(Sweden) A Magnusson (Sweden) S Strömvall	20	21	21
(Chinese Taipei) N G Chan (Chinese Taipei) Yang C-y	21	21	21
(South Korea) Kim M-j (South Korea) Kim M-s	23	17	15

Second round
7	(France) É Drouin (France) T Margueritte	21	21
(Norway) K Ødegårdstuen (Norway) K Ellingsen	15	10
(India) S Balaji (India) S Narayanan	21	21
(Belgium) A Boonen (Belgium) T van Wonterghem	13	8
12	(Netherlands) K de Wit (Netherlands) M Loos	21	15	13
(Denmark) L Hvid (Denmark) S Røjkjær	19	21	21
(Finland) P Saarnivaara (Finland) O Tapola	7	9
(Chinese Taipei) N G Chan (Chinese Taipei) Yang C-y	21	21

Third round
7	(France) É Drouin (France) T Margueritte	18	21	21
(India) S Balaji (India) S Narayanan	21	16	17
(Denmark) L Hvid (Denmark) S Røjkjær	18	12
(Chinese Taipei) N G Chan (Chinese Taipei) Yang C-y	21	21

Fourth round
7	(France) É Drouin (France) T Margueritte	9	16
(Chinese Taipei) N G Chan (Chinese Taipei) Yang C-y	21	21

=== Bottom half ===
==== Section 5 ====
First round
(Denmark) E I Braüner (Denmark) F Østergaard	14	15
(Japan) K Ishikawa (Japan) R Kiyose	21	21
(Georgia (country)) M Ovasapyan (Georgia (country)) E Zumbulidze	4	6
(Hong Kong) Chan W L (Hong Kong) Liang K W	21	21

Second round
(Japan) K Ishikawa (Japan) R Kiyose	21	21
(Australia) S Go (Australia) Y Zhang	7	5
(Germany) A Lehmann (Germany) A Mejikovskiy	21	24
9	(Peru) F Munar (Peru) R Munar	19	22
(Hong Kong) Chan W L (Hong Kong) Liang K W	21	21
(Iceland) L Bu (Iceland) H E Ingvarsdóttir	8	9
(Slovenia) N Bedič (Slovenia) K Matovič	10	8
6	(Indonesia) A Kamila (Indonesia) A Z D Ramadhani	21	21

Third round
(Japan) K Ishikawa (Japan) R Kiyose	21	21
(Germany) A Lehmann (Germany) A Mejikovskiy	7	17
(Hong Kong) Chan W L (Hong Kong) Liang K W	10	10
6	(Indonesia) A Kamila (Indonesia) A Z D Ramadhani	21	21

Fourth round
(Japan) K Ishikawa (Japan) R Kiyose	21	21
6	(Indonesia) A Kamila (Indonesia) A Z D Ramadhani	12	17

==== Section 6 ====
First round
(England) L Lee (England) T Parab	21	21
(Finland) S Asfar (Finland) H Santalahti	10	7

Second round
(England) L Lee (England) T Parab	19	19
(Denmark) M H Tommerup (Denmark) K Vang	21	21
(Hungary) T Orosz (Hungary) Z Szabó	11	18
13	(Czech Republic) K Koliášová (Czech Republic) K Osladilová	21	21
(Republic of Ireland) S Flynn (Republic of Ireland) S Noble	21	21
(Slovakia) S Slosiariková (Slovakia) M Telehaničová	15	13
(Malaysia) Ong X Y (Malaysia) C Ting	16	21
4	(France) M Hoareau (France) C Pognante	21	23

Third round
(Denmark) M H Tommerup (Denmark) K Vang	21	21
13	(Czech Republic) K Koliášová (Czech Republic) K Osladilová	13	15
(Republic of Ireland) S Flynn (Republic of Ireland) S Noble	17	13
4	(France) M Hoareau (France) C Pognante	21	21

Fourth round
(Denmark) M H Tommerup (Denmark) K Vang	18	16
4	(France) M Hoareau (France) C Pognante	21	21

==== Section 7 ====
First round
(Estonia) K Ilves (Estonia) M E Teller	12	7
(Thailand) P Pattanawaritthipan (Thailand) N Samart	21	21
(Singapore) Li ZH (Singapore) Li ZY	21	15	21
(United States) K Lee (United States) A Yang	18	21	17

Second round
(Thailand) P Pattanawaritthipan (Thailand) N Samart	21	13	21
(India) I Baruah (India) D Sihag	15	21	18
(Chinese Taipei) Lin Y-h (Chinese Taipei) Wang Y-z	21	21
10	(Bulgaria) M Chepisheva (Bulgaria) T Popivanova	15	12
(Singapore) Li ZH (Singapore) Li ZY	9	8
(Thailand) P Phanthui (Thailand) P Srisawat	21	21
(Sweden) E Öhling (Sweden) E Ryberg	21	16	11
5	(Switzerland) L Amiguet (Switzerland) V Appenzeller	15	21	21

Third round
(Thailand) P Pattanawaritthipan (Thailand) N Samart	8	18
(Chinese Taipei) Lin Y-h (Chinese Taipei) Wang Y-z	21	21
(Thailand) P Phanthui (Thailand) P Srisawat	21	21
5	(Switzerland) L Amiguet (Switzerland) V Appenzeller	18	9

Fourth round
(Chinese Taipei) Lin Y-h (Chinese Taipei) Wang Y-z	13	16
(Thailand) P Phanthui (Thailand) P Srisawat	21	21

==== Section 8 ====
First round
(Japan) M Taguchi (Japan) N Yamakita	21	21
(Norway) M Kragholm (Norway) S Pedersen	6	6

Second round
(Japan) M Taguchi (Japan) N Yamakita	21	21
(Sri Lanka) P Adhikari (Sri Lanka) M M Nallaperuma Archchi	12	7
(China) Liu S S (China) Wang T G	21	21
14	(Portugal) M Fortunato (Portugal) B Roberto	2	1
(Armenia) S Boyajyan (Armenia) L Smbatyan	1	4
(South Korea) Choi K-j (South Korea) Jeong D-y	21	21
(Canada) J Dent (Canada) C Lin	23	16	21
2	(Spain) N Carulla (Spain) L Rodríguez	21	21	16

Third round
(Japan) M Taguchi (Japan) N Yamakita	10	17
(China) Liu S S (China) Wang T G	21	21
(South Korea) Choi K-j (South Korea) Jeong D-y	21	21
(Canada) J Dent (Canada) C Lin	11	8

Fourth round
(China) Liu S S (China) Wang T G	21	21
(South Korea) Choi K-j (South Korea) Jeong D-y	16	12
