= Liu Shengshu =

Chinese badminton player (born 2004)

Liu Shengshu 刘圣书
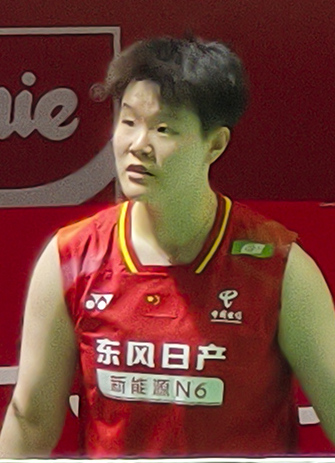
- Liu at the 2026 Indonesia Open

Personal information
- Born: 8 April 2004 (age 22) Liaoning, China
- Height: 1.76 m (5 ft 9 in)

Sport
- Country: China
- Sport: Badminton

Women's doubles
- Highest ranking: 1 (with Tan Ning, 22 October 2024)
- Current ranking: 1 (with Tan Ning, 27 October 2026)
- BWF profile
Medal record
Women's badminton
Representing China
Olympic Games
Silver medal – second place	2024 Paris	Women's doubles
World Championships
Gold medal – first place	2025 Paris	Women's doubles
Silver medal – second place	2026 New Delhi	Women's doubles
Sudirman Cup
Gold medal – first place	2023 Suzhou	Mixed team
Gold medal – first place	2025 Xiamen	Mixed team
Uber Cup
Gold medal – first place	2024 Chengdu	Women's team
Silver medal – second place	2026 Horsens	Women's team
Asian Games
Gold medal – first place	2026 Aichi–Nagoya	Women's team
Silver medal – second place	2026 Aichi–Nagoya	Women's doubles
Asian Championships
Gold medal – first place	2025 Ningbo	Women's doubles
Silver medal – second place	2026 Ningbo	Women's doubles
Bronze medal – third place	2024 Ningbo	Women's doubles
Asia Mixed Team Championships
Gold medal – first place	2023 Dubai	Mixed team
World Junior Championships
Gold medal – first place	2022 Santander	Girls' doubles
Gold medal – first place	2022 Santander	Mixed doubles

Liu Shengshu (simplified Chinese: 刘圣书; traditional Chinese: 劉聖書; pinyin: Liú Shèngshū; born 8 April 2004) is a Chinese badminton player. She won the women's doubles silver medal at the 2024 Olympic Games and a gold medal at the 2025 Asian Championships. She also helped the national team win the 2023 Asia Mixed Team Championships and the 2024 Uber Cup. In her junior career, Liu won both the girls' and mixed doubles events at the 2022 World Junior Championships. Liu reached a career high of world number 1 in the BWF World Rankings on 22 October 2024 with her partner Tan Ning.

== Career ==
After winning the World Junior Championships, she partnered Tan Ning and won against their compatriots Li Yijing and Luo Xumin at the Malaysia International in November 2022.

In 2023, she partnered with Zhang Shuxian, and won the 2023 Indonesia Masters on her World Tour debut. Her partnership with Tan continued to excel, helping to deliver the final point for the Chinese team when they competed against South Korea at the 2023 Badminton Asia Mixed Team Championships. In April, Liu and Tan won the 2023 Spain Masters after defeating their teammates Chen Fanghui and Du Yue with a score of 21–8, 16–21, 21–18.

In 2024, in her debut at the Olympics, Liu and her partner Tan advanced to the women's doubles final. They lost the gold medal match to their senior compatriot Chen Qingchen and Jia Yifan.

In 2025, Liu and Tan won the gold medal at the Asian Championships.

== Achievements ==
=== Olympic Games ===
Women's doubles
Year	Venue	Partner	Opponent	Score	Result	Ref.
2024	Porte de La Chapelle Arena, Paris, France	(China) Tan Ning	(China) Chen Qingchen (China) Jia Yifan	20–22, 15–21	Silver	

=== World Championships ===
Women's doubles
Year	Venue	Partner	Opponent	Score	Result	Ref.
2025	Adidas Arena, Paris, France	(China) Tan Ning	(Malaysia) Pearly Tan (Malaysia) Thinaah Muralitharan	21–14, 20–22, 21–17	Gold	
2026	Indira Gandhi Arena, New Delhi, India	(China) Tan Ning	(South Korea) Baek Ha-na (South Korea) Lee So-hee	15–21, 15–21	Silver	

=== Asian Games ===
Women's doubles
Year	Venue	Partner	Opponent	Score	Result	Ref.
2026	Ichinomiya City Municipal Gymnasium, Ichinomiya, Japan	(China) Tan Ning	(South Korea) Baek Ha-na (South Korea) Lee So-hee	28–26, 18–21, 18–21	Silver	

=== Asian Championships ===
Women's doubles
Year	Venue	Partner	Opponent	Score	Result	Ref.
2024	Ningbo Olympic Sports Center Gymnasium, Ningbo, China	(China) Tan Ning	(South Korea) Baek Ha-na (South Korea) Lee So-hee	21–12, 18–21, 12–21	Bronze	
2025	Ningbo Olympic Sports Center Gymnasium, Ningbo, China	(China) Tan Ning	(Japan) Nami Matsuyama (Japan) Chiharu Shida	21–15, 21–19	Gold	
2026	Ningbo Olympic Sports Center Gymnasium, Ningbo, China	(China) Tan Ning	(China) Li Yijing (China) Luo Xumin	5–8 retired	Silver	

=== World Junior Championships ===
Girls' doubles
Year	Venue	Partner	Opponent	Score	Result
2022	Palacio de Deportes de Santander, Santander, Spain	(China) Wang Tingge	(Indonesia) Meilysa Trias Puspita Sari (Indonesia) Rachel Allessya Rose	21–14, 21–16	Gold

Mixed doubles
Year	Venue	Partner	Opponent	Score	Result
2022	Palacio de Deportes de Santander, Santander, Spain	(China) Zhu Yijun	(China) Liao Pinyi (China) Huang Kexin	21–17, 21–17	Gold

=== BWF World Tour (19 titles, 8 runners-up) ===
The BWF World Tour, which was announced on 19 March 2017 and implemented in 2018, is a series of elite badminton tournaments sanctioned by the Badminton World Federation (BWF). The BWF World Tour is divided into levels of World Tour Finals, Super 1000, Super 750, Super 500, Super 300, and the BWF Tour Super 100.

Women's doubles
Year	Tournament	Level	Partner	Opponent	Score	Result	Ref.
2023	Indonesia Masters	Super 500	(China) Zhang Shuxian	(Japan) Yuki Fukushima (Japan) Sayaka Hirota	22–20, 21–19	(gold) Winner	
2023	Spain Masters	Super 300	(China) Tan Ning	(China) Chen Fanghui (China) Du Yue	21–8, 16–21, 21–18	(gold) Winner	
2023	Orléans Masters	Super 300	(China) Tan Ning	(Japan) Rena Miyaura (Japan) Ayako Sakuramoto	19–21, 21–16, 12–21	(silver) Runner-up	
2023	U.S. Open	Super 300	(China) Tan Ning	(Denmark) Maiken Fruergaard (Denmark) Sara Thygesen	21–19, 21–19	(gold) Winner	
2023	Australian Open	Super 500	(China) Tan Ning	(South Korea) Kim So-yeong (South Korea) Kong Hee-yong	18–21, 16–21	(silver) Runner-up	
2023	Arctic Open	Super 500	(China) Tan Ning	(Thailand) Jongkolphan Kititharakul (Thailand) Rawinda Prajongjai	21–13, 24–22	(gold) Winner	
2023	French Open	Super 750	(China) Tan Ning	(Thailand) Jongkolphan Kititharakul (Thailand) Rawinda Prajongjai	26–24, 21–19	(gold) Winner	
2023	Japan Masters	Super 500	(China) Tan Ning	(China) Zhang Shuxian (China) Zheng Yu	21–12, 12–21, 17–21	(silver) Runner-up	
2024	Malaysia Open	Super 1000	(China) Tan Ning	(China) Zhang Shuxian (China) Zheng Yu	21–18, 21–18	(gold) Winner	
2024	Indonesia Masters	Super 500	(China) Tan Ning	(China) Zhang Shuxian (China) Zheng Yu	10–21, 21–19, 22–20	(gold) Winner	
2024	Japan Open	Super 750	(China) Tan Ning	(South Korea) Baek Ha-na (South Korea) Lee So-hee	21–18, 22–20	(gold) Winner	
2024	Hong Kong Open	Super 500	(China) Tan Ning	(Malaysia) Pearly Tan (Malaysia) Thinaah Muralitharan	14–21, 14–21	(silver) Runner-up	
2024	Arctic Open	Super 500	(China) Tan Ning	(Malaysia) Pearly Tan (Malaysia) Thinaah Muralitharan	21–12, 21–17	(gold) Winner	
2024	Denmark Open	Super 750	(China) Tan Ning	(Japan) Rin Iwanaga (Japan) Kie Nakanishi	18–21, 14–21	(silver) Runner-up	
2024	Japan Masters	Super 500	(China) Tan Ning	(Japan) Yuki Fukushima (Japan) Mayu Matsumoto	21–15, 21–5	(gold) Winner	
2024	China Masters	Super 750	(China) Tan Ning	(China) Li Yijing (China) Luo Xumin	21–10, 21–10	(gold) Winner	
2025	Swiss Open	Super 300	(China) Tan Ning	(China) Jia Yifan (China) Zhang Shuxian	19–21, 21–14, 17–21	(silver) Runner-up	
2025	Malaysia Masters	Super 500	(China) Tan Ning	(China) Jia Yifan (China) Zhang Shuxian	21–17, 21–18	(gold) Winner	
2025	Indonesia Open	Super 1000	(China) Tan Ning	(Malaysia) Pearly Tan (Malaysia) Thinaah Muralitharan	23–25, 21–12, 21–19	(gold) Winner	
2025	Japan Open	Super 750	(China) Tan Ning	(Malaysia) Pearly Tan (Malaysia) Thinaah Muralitharan	21–15, 21–14	(gold) Winner	
2025	China Open	Super 1000	(China) Tan Ning	(China) Jia Yifan (China) Zhang Shuxian	24–22, 17–21, 21–14	(gold) Winner	
2026	Malaysia Open	Super 1000	(China) Tan Ning	(South Korea) Baek Ha-na (South Korea) Lee So-hee	21–18, 21–12	(gold) Winner	
2026	India Open	Super 750	(China) Tan Ning	(Japan) Yuki Fukushima (Japan) Mayu Matsumoto	21–11, 21–18	(gold) Winner	
2026	All England Open	Super 1000	(China) Tan Ning	(South Korea) Baek Ha-na (South Korea) Lee So-hee	21–18, 21–12	(gold) Winner	
2026	Singapore Open	Super 750	(China) Tan Ning	(China) Jia Yifan (China) Zhang Shuxian	20–22, 19–21	(silver) Runner-up	
2026	Indonesia Open	Super 1000	(China) Tan Ning	(Japan) Yuki Fukushima (Japan) Mayu Matsumoto	15–21, 21–18, 18–21	(silver) Runner-up	
2026	China Open	Super 1000	(China) Tan Ning	(Japan) Yuki Fukushima (Japan) Mayu Matsumoto	21–14, 21–19	(gold) Winner	

=== BWF International Challenge/Series (1 title) ===
Women's doubles
Year	Tournament	Partner	Opponent	Score	Result	Ref.
2022	Malaysia International	(China) Tan Ning	(China) Li Yijing (China) Luo Xumin	24–22, 21–16	(gold) Winner	

BWF International Challenge tournament
BWF International Series tournament

=== BWF Junior International (2 titles) ===
Girls' doubles
Year	Tournament	Partner	Opponent	Score	Result
2022	German Ruhr U19 International	(China) Wang Tingge	(China) Li Huazhou (China) Liao Lixi	21–13, 21–11	(gold) Winner

Mixed doubles
Year	Tournament	Partner	Opponent	Score	Result
2022	German Ruhr U19 International	(China) Zhu Yijun	(China) Liao Pinyi (China) Huang Kexin	21–19, 21–14	(gold) Winner

BWF Junior International Grand Prix tournament
BWF Junior International Challenge tournament
BWF Junior International Series tournament
BWF Junior Future Series tournament
