= 2023 Orléans Masters =

Badminton tournament in Orléans

Tournament details
- Dates: 4–9 April
- Edition: 11th
- Level: Super 300
- Total prize money: US$240,000
- Venue: Palais des Sports
- Location: Orléans, Centre-Val de Loire, France

Champions
- Men's singles: (India) Priyanshu Rajawat
- Women's singles: (Spain) Carolina Marín
- Men's doubles: (China) Chen Boyang (China) Liu Yi
- Women's doubles: (Japan) Rena Miyaura (Japan) Ayako Sakuramoto
- Mixed doubles: (Malaysia) Chen Tang Jie (Malaysia) Toh Ee Wei

The 2023 Orléans Masters (officially known as Orléans Masters Badminton 2023 presented by Victor for sponsorship reasons) was a badminton tournament which took place in the Palais des Sports at Orléans, France, from 4 to 9 April 2023. The tournament had a total prize pool of $240,000. This was the first edition of the tournament since being upgraded from the Super 100 to the Super 300 level.

== Tournament ==
The 2023 Orléans Masters was the tenth tournament of the 2023 BWF World Tour and was also part of the Orléans Masters which had been held since 2012. It was organized by the Orléans Masters with sanction from the Badminton World Federation.

=== Venue ===
This tournament was held at the Palais des Sports in Orléans, Centre-Val de Loire, France.

=== Point distribution ===
Below is the point distribution table for each phase of the tournament based on the BWF points system for the BWF World Tour Super 300 event.

Winner	Runner-up	3/4	5/8	9/16	17/32	33/64	65/128
7,000	5,950	4,900	3,850	2,750	1,670	660	320

=== Prize pool ===
The total prize money was US$240,000 with the distribution of the prize money in accordance with BWF regulations.

Event	Winner	Finalist	Semi-finals	Quarter-finals	Last 16
Singles	$18,000	$9,120	$3,480	$1,440	$840
Doubles	$18,960	$9,120	$3,360	$1,740	$900

== Men's singles ==
=== Seeds ===
1. (Japan) Kenta Nishimoto (second round)
2. (Japan) Kanta Tsuneyama (first round)
3. (Indonesia) Chico Aura Dwi Wardoyo (withdrew)
4. (Denmark) Anders Antonsen (first round)
5. (Denmark) Rasmus Gemke (first round)
6. (France) Toma Junior Popov (first round)
7. (Malaysia) Ng Tze Yong (withdrew)
8. (Thailand) Kantaphon Wangcharoen (withdrew)

=== Finals ===
Semi-finals
PFQ	(India) Priyanshu Rajawat	21	21
(Republic of Ireland) Nhat Nguyen	12	9
Q1	(China) Lei Lanxi	21	15	19
PFQ	(Denmark) Magnus Johannesen	10	21	21

Final
PFQ	(India) Priyanshu Rajawat	21	19	21
PFQ	(Denmark) Magnus Johannesen	15	21	16

=== Top half ===
==== Section 1 ====
First round
1	(Japan) K Nishimoto	21	21
(Chinese Taipei) Lee C-h	18	11
PFQ	(India) P Rajawat	21	21
(India) K George	18	13
5	(Denmark) R Gemke	12	9^{r}
PFQ	(Chinese Taipei) Chi Y-j	21	11
(Denmark) V Svendsen	22	23
(India) M Manjunath	24	25

Second round
1	(Japan) K Nishimoto	8	16
PFQ	(India) P Rajawat	21	21
PFQ	(Chinese Taipei) Chi Y-j	21	21
(India) M Manjunath	15	19

Quarter-finals
PFQ	(India) P Rajawat	21	21
PFQ	(Chinese Taipei) Chi Y-j	18	18

==== Section 2 ====
First round
PFQ	(Czech Republic) J Louda	21	21
(Thailand) S Thammasin	18	15
(Republic of Ireland) N Nguyen	19	21	21
(India) Sa Verma	21	19	17
PFQ	(Malaysia) Soong J V	20	3^{r}
(Israel) M Zilberman	22	5
(France) B Leverdez	17	11
(Spain) L E Peñalver	21	21

Second round
PFQ	(Czech Republic) J Louda	15	17
(Republic of Ireland) N Nguyen	21	21
(Israel) M Zilberman	21	18	21
(Spain) L E Peñalver	19	21	10

Quarter-finals
(Republic of Ireland) N Nguyen	w	/	o
(Israel) M Zilberman

=== Bottom half ===
==== Section 3 ====
First round
Q2	(Sweden) F Burestedt	21	12	12
(France) C Popov	17	21	21
Q1	(China) Lei LX	21	21
PFQ	(Germany) K Schäfer	16	12
(Denmark) M Christophersen	21	21
(Chinese Taipei) Lin C-y	14	9
Q3	(France) A Lanier	21	5	21
4	(Denmark) A Antonsen	12	21	10

Second round
(France) C Popov	15	12
Q1	(China) Lei LX	21	21
(Denmark) M Christophersen	23	17	18
Q3	(France) A Lanier	21	21	21

Quarter-finals
Q1	(China) Lei LX	21	21
Q3	(France) A Lanier	19	19

==== Section 4 ====
First round
PFQ	(Denmark) M Johannesen	21	21
(Malaysia) Cheam J W	19	10
PFQ	(Indonesia) C Adinata	16	21	21
6	(France) T J Popov	21	19	16
(India) B. Sai Praneeth	20	17
Q4	(Malaysia) Leong J H	22	21
(Japan) K Watanabe	13	21	21
2	(Japan) K Tsuneyama	21	7	8

Second round
PFQ	(Denmark) M Johannesen	22	21	23
PFQ	(Indonesia) C Adinata	24	16	21
Q4	(Malaysia) Leong J H	21	21
(Japan) K Watanabe	19	16

Quarter-finals
PFQ	(Denmark) M Johannesen	21	21
Q4	(Malaysia) Leong J H	19	16

== Women's singles ==
=== Seeds ===
1. (Spain) Carolina Marín (champion)
2. (Thailand) Busanan Ongbamrungphan (withdrew)
3. (Indonesia) Gregoria Mariska Tunjung (withdrew)
4. (Canada) Michelle Li (withdrew)
5. (Chinese Taipei) Hsu Wen-chi (first round)
6. (United States) Beiwen Zhang (final)
7. (Scotland) Kirsty Gilmour (second round)
8. (Denmark) Line Kjærsfeldt (semi-finals)

=== Finals ===
Semi-finals
1	(Spain) Carolina Marín	21	21
8	(Denmark) Line Kjærsfeldt	11	13
(Germany) Yvonne Li	12	19
6	(United States) Beiwen Zhang	21	21

Final
1	(Spain) Carolina Marín	25	9	21
6	(United States) Beiwen Zhang	23	21	10

=== Top half ===
==== Section 1 ====
First round
1	(Spain) C Marín	21	21
(Denmark) L Christophersen	9	18
(India) S Nehwal	16	14
Q2	(Turkey) N Yiğit	21	21
5	(Chinese Taipei) Hsu W-c	13	13
(Singapore) Yeo J M	21	21
(Denmark) J D Jakobsen	19	13
Q1	(Indonesia) E N T Wardoyo	21	21

Second round
1	(Spain) C Marín	21	21
Q2	(Turkey) N Yiğit	9	12
(Singapore) Yeo J M	21	21
Q1	(Indonesia) E N T Wardoyo	12	16

Quarter-finals
1	(Spain) C Marín	21	21
(Singapore) Yeo J M	13	14

==== Section 2 ====
First round
PFQ	(France) L Huet	17	18
PFQ	(India) T Hemanth	21	21
(India) A Kashyap	8	21	8
(Japan) N Nidaira	21	13	21
8	(Denmark) L Kjærsfeldt	22	21
Q3	(France) R O Pancasari	20	18
(Chinese Taipei) Sung S-y	15	21	21
(Belgium) L Tan	21	16	18

Second round
PFQ	(India) T Hemanth	8	17
(Japan) N Nidaira	21	21
8	(Denmark) L Kjærsfeldt	19	21	21
(Chinese Taipei) Sung S-y	21	16	14

Quarter-finals
(Japan) N Nidaira	16	19
8	(Denmark) L Kjærsfeldt	21	21

=== Bottom half ===
==== Section 3 ====
First round
(Germany) Y Li	20	21	21
PFQ	(India) T Mir	22	13	5
(Spain) C Azurmendi	22	20	11
7	(Scotland) K Gilmour	20	22	21
Q4	(China) Gao FJ	21	21
(United States) L Lam	16	8
(Indonesia) P K Wardani	21	21
PFQ	(Canada) WY Zhang	12	18

Second round
(Germany) Y Li	23	11	21
7	(Scotland) K Gilmour	21	21	19
Q4	(China) Gao FJ	20	21	12
(Indonesia) P K Wardani	22	6	21

Quarter-finals
(Germany) Y Li	21	21
(Indonesia) P K Wardani	18	12

==== Section 4 ====
First round
PFQ	(Canada) T Ng	21	23
(Japan) A Ohori	19	21
(France) Qi XF	8	12
6	(United States) BW Zhang	21	21
(United States) I Wang	21	15
(Malaysia) Kisona S	17	12^{r}
PFQ	(Myanmar) Thet Htar T	22	21
PFQ	(India) A Chaliha	20	17

Second round
PFQ	(Canada) T Ng	13	9
6	(United States) BW Zhang	21	21
(United States) I Wang	12	21	21
PFQ	(Myanmar) Thet Htar T	21	18	18

Quarter-finals
6	(United States) BW Zhang	12	21	21
(United States) I Wang	21	16	13

== Men's doubles ==
=== Seeds ===
1. (India) Satwiksairaj Rankireddy / Chirag Shetty (withdrew)
2. (Indonesia) Leo Rolly Carnando / Daniel Marthin (semi-finals)
3. (Indonesia) Muhammad Shohibul Fikri / Bagas Maulana (final)
4. (England) Ben Lane / Sean Vendy (first round)
5. (Indonesia) Pramudya Kusumawardana / Yeremia Rambitan (second round)
6. (Scotland) Alexander Dunn / Adam Hall (first round)
7. (India) Arjun M. R. / Dhruv Kapila (quarter-finals)
8. (Japan) Keiichiro Matsui / Yoshinori Takeuchi (second round)

=== Finals ===
Semi-finals
Q2	(China) Chen Boyang (China) Liu Yi	21	21
(Chinese Taipei) Lee Jhe-huei (Chinese Taipei) Yang Po-hsuan	15	15
3	(Indonesia) Muhammad Shohibul Fikri (Indonesia) Bagas Maulana	13	21	23
2	(Indonesia) Leo Rolly Carnando (Indonesia) Daniel Marthin	21	18	21

Final
Q2	(China) Chen Boyang (China) Liu Yi	21	21
3	(Indonesia) Muhammad Shohibul Fikri (Indonesia) Bagas Maulana	19	17

=== Top half ===
==== Section 1 ====
First round
PFQ	(Republic of Ireland) J Magee (Republic of Ireland) P Reynolds	11	14
PFQ	(Japan) S Mezaki (Japan) H Nishida	21	21
(Canada) K Lee (Canada) T A Lindeman	10	10
(France) L Corvée (France) R Labar	21	21
6	(Scotland) A Dunn (Scotland) A Hall	12	12
Q2	(China) Chen BY (China) Liu Y	21	21
Q1	(Denmark) D Lundgaard (Denmark) M Vestergaard	21	21
(France) C Popov (France) T J Popov	19	19

Second round
PFQ	(Japan) S Mezaki (Japan) H Nishida	21	16	19
(France) L Corvée (France) R Labar	14	21	21
Q2	(China) Chen BY (China) Liu Y	21	21
Q1	(Denmark) D Lundgaard (Denmark) M Vestergaard	18	19

Quarter-finals
(France) L Corvée (France) R Labar	17	21	10
Q2	(China) Chen BY (China) Liu Y	21	19	21

==== Section 2 ====
First round
3	(England) B Lane (England) S Vendy	16	17
(Chinese Taipei) Su C-h (Chinese Taipei) Ye H-w	21	21
(United States) V Chiu (United States) J Yuan	8	19
(Chinese Taipei) Lee J-h (Chinese Taipei) Yang P-hs	21	21
5	(Indonesia) P Kusumawardana (Indonesia) Y Rambitan	28	21
(Chinese Taipei) Lee F-c (Chinese Taipei) Lee F-j	26	17
(Chinese Taipei) Chiu H-c (Chinese Taipei) Yang M-t	16	15
PFQ	(France) J Maio (France) W Villeger	21	21

Second round
(Chinese Taipei) Su C-h (Chinese Taipei) Ye H-w	18	16
(Chinese Taipei) Lee J-h (Chinese Taipei) Yang P-hs	21	21
5	(Indonesia) P Kusumawardana (Indonesia) Y Rambitan	19	21	20
PFQ	(France) J Maio (France) W Villeger	21	17	22

Quarter-finals
(Chinese Taipei) Lee J-h (Chinese Taipei) Yang P-hs	w	/	o
PFQ	(France) J Maio (France) W Villeger

=== Bottom half ===
==== Section 3 ====
First round
(Japan) A Endo (Japan) Y Takei	21	21
(Canada) A Dong (Canada) N Yakura	14	15
PFQ	(Malaysia) Goh V S (Malaysia) Lim K W	14	15
8	(Japan) K Matsui (Japan) Y Takeuchi	21	21
Q4	(Chinese Taipei) Lin Y-c (Chinese Taipei) Su L-w	21	25	19
(Scotland) C Grimley (Scotland) M Grimley	19	27	21
PFQ	(England) R Easton (England) Z Russ	11	15
3	(Indonesia) M S Fikri (Indonesia) B Maulana	21	21

Second round
(Japan) A Endo (Japan) Y Takei	21	21
8	(Japan) K Matsui (Japan) Y Takeuchi	12	16
(Scotland) C Grimley (Scotland) M Grimley	17	22	19
3	(Indonesia) M S Fikri (Indonesia) B Maulana	21	20	21

Quarter-finals
(Japan) A Endo (Japan) Y Takei	14	13
3	(Indonesia) M S Fikri (Indonesia) B Maulana	21	21

==== Section 4 ====
First round
PFQ	(Norway) T Flåtten (Norway) V Rikheim	9	10
(Japan) K Mitsuhashi (Japan) H Okamura	21	21
PFQ	(Czech Republic) O Král (Czech Republic) A Mendrek	13	20
7	(India) Arjun M. R. (India) D Kapila	21	22
(Chinese Taipei) Chang K-c (Chinese Taipei) Po L-w	18	13
(Denmark) J Bay (Denmark) L Mølhede	21	21
Q3	(Malaysia) Boon X Y (Malaysia) Wong T C	14	17
2	(Indonesia) L R Carnando (Indonesia) D Marthin	21	21

Second round
(Japan) K Mitsuhashi (Japan) H Okamura	15	21	16
7	(India) Arjun M. R. (India) D Kapila	21	17	21
(Denmark) J Bay (Denmark) L Mølhede	25	15
2	(Indonesia) L R Carnando (Indonesia) D Marthin	27	21

Quarter-finals
7	(India) Arjun M. R. (India) D Kapila	21	11	20
2	(Indonesia) L R Carnando (Indonesia) D Marthin	16	21	22

== Women's doubles ==
=== Seeds ===
1. (Indonesia) Febriana Dwipuji Kusuma / Amalia Cahaya Pratiwi (quarter-finals)
2. (Denmark) Maiken Fruergaard / Sara Thygesen (semi-finals)
3. (Japan) Rui Hirokami / Yuna Kato (second round)
4. (Chinese Taipei) Lee Chia-hsin / Teng Chun-hsun (withdrew)
5. (France) Margot Lambert / Anne Tran (second round)
6. (Japan) Rena Miyaura / Ayako Sakuramoto (champions)
7. (England) Chloe Birch / Lauren Smith (quarter-finals)
8. (Scotland) Julie MacPherson / Ciara Torrance (withdrew)

=== Finals ===
Semi-finals
(Indonesia) Lanny Tria Mayasari (Indonesia) Ribka Sugiarto	8	12
Q4	(China) Liu Shengshu (China) Tan Ning	21	21
6	(Japan) Rena Miyaura (Japan) Ayako Sakuramoto	21	21
2	(Denmark) Maiken Fruergaard (Denmark) Sara Thygesen	18	16

Final
Q4	(China) Liu Shengshu (China) Tan Ning	19	21	12
6	(Japan) Rena Miyaura (Japan) Ayako Sakuramoto	21	16	21

=== Top half ===
==== Section 1 ====
First round
1	(Indonesia) F D Kusuma (Indonesia) A C Pratiwi	21	21
(Chinese Taipei) Hu L-f (Chinese Taipei) Lin X-m	12	14
PFQ	(Poland) D Kwaśnik (Poland) K Marczak	22	19
PFQ	(Sweden) M Norrman (Slovenia) L Salehar	24	21
5	(France) M Lambert (France) A Tran	21	21
(United States) A Xu (United States) K Xu	18	18
(Indonesia) L T Mayasari (Indonesia) R Sugiarto	21	21
(India) S Singhi (India) R Thaker	14	15

Second round
1	(Indonesia) F D Kusuma (Indonesia) A C Pratiwi	21	21
PFQ	(Sweden) M Norrman (Slovenia) L Salehar	8	10
5	(France) M Lambert (France) A Tran	19	21	19
(Indonesia) L T Mayasari (Indonesia) R Sugiarto	21	14	21

Quarter-finals
1	(Indonesia) F D Kusuma (Indonesia) A C Pratiwi	15	9
(Indonesia) L T Mayasari (Indonesia) R Sugiarto	21	21

==== Section 2 ====
First round
3	(Japan) R Hirokami (Japan) Y Kato	22	21
(Japan) S Hobara (Japan) Y Suizu	20	17
(Chinese Taipei) Hsu Y-c (Chinese Taipei) Lin W-c	7	11
Q4	(China) Liu SS (China) Tan N	21	21
PFQ	(Chinese Taipei) Hsu Y-h (Chinese Taipei) Lee C-c	21	21
(Germany) S Küspert (Germany) E Moszczynski	17	14
(India) N. S Reddy (India) A S Sunil	19	21	19
(Ukraine) M Stoliarenko (Ukraine) Y Zharka	21	15	21

Second round
3	(Japan) R Hirokami (Japan) Y Kato	12	12
Q4	(China) Liu SS (China) Tan N	21	21
PFQ	(Chinese Taipei) Hsu Y-h (Chinese Taipei) Lee C-c	21	21
(Ukraine) M Stoliarenko (Ukraine) Y Zharka	18	10

Quarter-finals
Q4	(China) Liu SS (China) Tan N	21	21
PFQ	(Chinese Taipei) Hsu Y-h (Chinese Taipei) Lee C-c	11	14

=== Bottom half ===
==== Section 3 ====
First round
(Canada) C Choi (Canada) J Wu	21	21
(Brazil) J Lima (Brazil) S Lima	19	16
(France) S Bauer (France) E Vercelot	12	13
6	(Japan) R Miyaura (Japan) A Sakuramoto	21	21
(China) Li YJ (China) Luo XM	21	21
(Chinese Taipei) Chang C-h (Chinese Taipei) Yang C-t	11	14
(Republic of Ireland) K Frost (Republic of Ireland) M Ryan	9	9
PFQ	(India) T Crasto (India) A Ponnappa	21	21

Second round
(Canada) C Choi (Canada) J Wu	12	14
6	(Japan) R Miyaura (Japan) A Sakuramoto	21	21
(China) Li YJ (China) Luo XM	21	23
PFQ	(India) T Crasto (India) A Ponnappa	14	21

Quarter-finals
6	(Japan) R Miyaura (Japan) A Sakuramoto	21	19	24
(China) Li YJ (China) Luo XM	17	21	22

==== Section 4 ====
First round
(Indonesia) M T Puspita Sari (Indonesia) R A Rose	21	21
(Italy) M Corsini (Italy) J Mair	13	13
PFQ	(United States) P L Cao Hok (United States) L Lam	16	20
7	(England) C Birch (England) L Smith	21	22
Q1	(Australia) K Ea (Australia) G Somerville	13	11
Q2	(Netherlands) K de Wit (Netherlands) A Tirtosentono	21	21
Q3	(Canada) T Ng (Canada) WY Zhang	10	17
2	(Denmark) M Fruergaard (Denmark) S Thygesen	21	21

Second round
(Indonesia) M T Puspita Sari (Indonesia) R A Rose	19	11
7	(England) C Birch (England) L Smith	21	21
Q2	(Netherlands) K de Wit (Netherlands) A Tirtosentono	12	21	10
2	(Denmark) M Fruergaard (Denmark) S Thygesen	21	18	21

Quarter-finals
7	(England) C Birch (England) L Smith	17	8
2	(Denmark) M Fruergaard (Denmark) S Thygesen	21	21

== Mixed doubles ==
=== Seeds ===
1. (France) Thom Gicquel / Delphine Delrue (withdrew)
2. (Malaysia) Tan Kian Meng / Lai Pei Jing (withdrew)
3. (Indonesia) Rinov Rivaldy / Pitha Haningtyas Mentari (withdrew)
4. (Indonesia) Rehan Naufal Kusharjanto / Lisa Ayu Kusumawati (semi-finals)
5. (Denmark) Mathias Christiansen / Alexandra Bøje (second round)
6. (Indonesia) Praveen Jordan / Melati Daeva Oktavianti (withdrew)
7. (Malaysia) Chen Tang Jie / Toh Ee Wei (champions)
8. (England) Marcus Ellis / Lauren Smith (first round)

=== Finals ===
Semi-finals
PFQ	(Indonesia) Adnan Maulana (Indonesia) Nita Violina Marwah	18	21	12
(Chinese Taipei) Ye Hong-wei (Chinese Taipei) Lee Chia-hsin	21	17	21
4	(Indonesia) Rehan Naufal Kusharjanto (Indonesia) Lisa Ayu Kusumawati	10	16
7	(Malaysia) Chen Tang Jie (Malaysia) Toh Ee Wei	21	21

Final
(Chinese Taipei) Ye Hong-wei (Chinese Taipei) Lee Chia-hsin	19	17
7	(Malaysia) Chen Tang Jie (Malaysia) Toh Ee Wei	21	21

=== Top half ===
==== Section 1 ====
First round
PFQ	(Denmark) J Toft (Denmark) C Graversen	22	14	18
(Chinese Taipei) Chang K-c (Chinese Taipei) Lee C-c	20	21	21
(China) Cheng X (China) Chen FH	14	16
(Malaysia) Chan P S (Malaysia) Cheah Y S	21	21
8	(England) M Ellis (England) L Smith	19	24	17
(Scotland) A Hall (Scotland) J MacPherson	21	22	21
PFQ	(Indonesia) A Maulana (Indonesia) N V Marwah	16	21	21
(Denmark) M Mikkelsen (Denmark) R Søby Hansen	21	13	15

Second round
(Chinese Taipei) Chang K-c (Chinese Taipei) Lee C-c	12	21	16
(Malaysia) Chan P S (Malaysia) Cheah Y S	21	10	21
(Scotland) A Hall (Scotland) J MacPherson	21	11	16
PFQ	(Indonesia) A Maulana (Indonesia) N V Marwah	17	21	21

Quarter-finals
(Malaysia) Chan P S (Malaysia) Cheah Y S	21	12	9
PFQ	(Indonesia) A Maulana (Indonesia) N V Marwah	17	21	21

==== Section 2 ====
First round
PFQ	(Indonesia) A Syahnawi (Indonesia) W O Kandow	21	21
Q4	(Chinese Taipei) Po L-w (Chinese Taipei) Chang C-h	15	10
(Chinese Taipei) Lee J-h (Chinese Taipei) Hsu Y-c	10	21	21
(Indonesia) A B Cahyono (Indonesia) M G Islami	21	18	14
5	(Denmark) M Christiansen (Denmark) A Bøje	21	21
(Canada) T A Lindeman (Canada) J Wu	17	9
(Chinese Taipei) Ye H-w (Chinese Taipei) Lee C-h	25	21	21
(Chinese Taipei) Yang P-hs (Chinese Taipei) Hu L-f	27	13	11

Second round
PFQ	(Indonesia) A Syahnawi (Indonesia) W O Kandow	21	10	21
(Chinese Taipei) Lee J-h (Chinese Taipei) Hsu Y-c	13	21	14
5	(Denmark) M Christiansen (Denmark) A Bøje	16	23	15
(Chinese Taipei) Ye H-w (Chinese Taipei) Lee C-h	21	21	21

Quarter-finals
PFQ	(Indonesia) A Syahnawi (Indonesia) W O Kandow	17	13
(Chinese Taipei) Ye H-w (Chinese Taipei) Lee C-h	21	21

=== Bottom half ===
==== Section 3 ====
First round
(Brazil) F Farias (Brazil) J Lima	22	17	9
(United States) V Chiu (United States) J Gai	20	21	21
Q1	(Germany) J C Völker (Germany) S Küspert	21	21
PFQ	(India) R Kapoor (India) N. S Reddy	18	18
(Denmark) M Vestergaard (Denmark) C Busch	19	15
(Malaysia) Hoo P R (Malaysia) Teoh M X	21	21
Q3	(Chinese Taipei) Chiu H-c (Chinese Taipei) Lin X-m	17	16
4	(Indonesia) R N Kusharjanto (Indonesia) L A Kusumawati	21	21

Second round
(United States) V Chiu (United States) J Gai	21	21
Q1	(Germany) J C Völker (Germany) S Küspert	14	14
(Malaysia) Hoo P R (Malaysia) Teoh M X	17	9
4	(Indonesia) R N Kusharjanto (Indonesia) L A Kusumawati	21	21

Quarter-finals
(United States) V Chiu (United States) J Gai	9	21	14
4	(Indonesia) R N Kusharjanto (Indonesia) L A Kusumawati	21	17	21

==== Section 4 ====
First round
Q2	(India) K. S Pratheek (India) T Crasto	21	21
(Algeria) K Mammeri (Algeria) T Mammeri	14	17
(Thailand) R Oupthong (Thailand) J Sudjaipraparat	16	18
7	(Malaysia) Chen T J (Malaysia) Toh E W	21	21
(Indonesia) Z J Sumanti (Indonesia) H Julimarbela	16	20
(England) G Mairs (England) J Moore	21	22
(China) Jiang ZB (China) Wei YX	21	21
PFQ	(India) B. S Reddy (India) A Ponnappa	18	15

Second round
Q2	(India) K. S Pratheek (India) T Crasto	23	17	21
7	(Malaysia) Chen T J (Malaysia) Toh E W	21	21	23
(England) G Mairs (England) J Moore	18	11
(China) Jiang ZB (China) Wei YX	21	21

Quarter-finals
7	(Malaysia) Chen T J (Malaysia) Toh E W	21	21
(China) Jiang ZB (China) Wei YX	14	15

Preceded by 2023 Spain Masters	BWF World Tour; 2023 BWF season	Succeeded by 2023 Malaysia Masters
