= Badminton at the 2026 Asian Games – Women's doubles =

Women's Doubles at the 2026 Asian Games
- Venue: Ichinomiya City Municipal Gymnasium, Japan
- Dates: 25–29 September 2026
- Competitors: 27 pairs from 17 nations

Medalists
gold medal	Baek Ha-na; Lee So-hee	South Korea
silver medal	Liu Shengshu; Tan Ning	China
bronze medal	Pearly Tan; Thinaah Muralitharan	Malaysia
bronze medal	Rin Uesaka; Kie Nakanishi	Japan

The women's doubles badminton tournament at the 2026 Asian Games will be held from 25 to 29 September 2026 at the Ichinomiya City Municipal Gymnasium in Ichinomiya, Japan. Chen Qingchen and Jia Yifan of China are the defending champions.

== Schedule ==
All times are Japanese Standard Time (UTC+09:00)

Date	Day	Time	Event
25 September	Friday	15:00	Round of 32
26 September	Saturday	15:00	Round of 16
27 September	Sunday	09:30	Quarter-finals
28 September	Monday	09:30	Semifinals
29 September	Tuesday	11:00	Gold medal match

== Seeds ==
The top four Asian pairs were seeded based on the BWF World Rankings published on 25 August 2026.

1. Liu Shengshu / Tan Ning (CHN) (final)
2. Baek Ha-na / Lee So-hee (KOR) (champions)
3. Yuki Fukushima / Mayu Matsumoto (JPN) (second round)
4. Jia Yifan / Zhang Shuxian (CHN) (second round)

== Results ==
=== Elimination Round ===
==== Section 1 ====
Round of 32
R Maharjan (NEP); R Sherchan (NEP)	3	5
Kim H-j (KOR); Lee Y-w (KOR)	21	21
Hsieh P-s (TPE); Hung E-t (TPE)	21	21
A Odbayar (MGL); E Tselmeg-od (MGL)	4	5

Round of 16
1	Liu SS (CHN); Tan N (CHN)	19	21	21
Kim H-j (KOR); Lee Y-w (KOR)	21	9	18
A Kuleshova (KAZ); D Namenova (KAZ)	10	5
Hsieh P-s (TPE); Hung E-t (TPE)	21	21

Quarter-finals
1	Liu SS (CHN); Tan N (CHN)	21	21
Hsieh P-s (TPE); Hung E-t (TPE)	15	15

==== Section 2 ====
Round of 32
Lui L L (HKG); Tsang H Y (HKG)	16	21	16
T Jolly (IND); G Gopichand (IND)	21	16	21
R A Rose (INA); F Setianingrum (INA)	13	11
P Tan (MAS); T Muralitharan (MAS)	21	21
Kim J-h (PRK); Yu M-s (PRK)	19	8
H Mijad (THA); N Tungkasatan (THA)	21	21

Round of 16
3	Y Fukushima (JPN); M Matsumoto (JPN)	22	18
T Jolly (IND); G Gopichand (IND)	24	21
P Tan (MAS); T Muralitharan (MAS)	21	21
H Mijad (THA); N Tungkasatan (THA)	8	12

Quarter-finals
T Jolly (IND); G Gopichand (IND)	18	9
P Tan (MAS); T Muralitharan (MAS)	21	21

==== Section 3 ====
Round of 32
A N Abdul Razzaq (MDV); F N Abdul Razzaq (MDV)	9	6
J Sudjaipraparat (THA); N Aimsaard (THA)	21	21
Ng W C (MAC); Pui C W (MAC)	9	10
Yeung N T (HKG); Yeung P L (HKG)	21	21
Phạm T D L (VIE); Phạm T K (VIE)	15	8
R Uesaka (JPN); K Nakanishi (JPN)	21	21

Round of 16
J Sudjaipraparat (THA); N Aimsaard (THA)	21	20	19
Yeung N T (HKG); Yeung P L (HKG)	11	22	21
R Uesaka (JPN); K Nakanishi (JPN)	9	21	21
4	Jia YF (CHN); Zhang SX (CHN)	21	18	15

Quarter-finals
Yeung N T (HKG); Yeung P L (HKG)	15	21	15
R Uesaka (JPN); K Nakanishi (JPN)	21	19	21

==== Section 4 ====
Round of 32
Hsu Y-h (TPE); Lin J-y (TPE)	21	21
Low Z Y (MAS); N Maisarah (MAS)	10	13
M Ganbaatar (MGL); S Kherlenbaatar (MGL)	8	9
N Rakhmetullayeva (KAZ); K Smagulova (KAZ)	21	21
F D Kusuma (INA); M T Puspita Sari (INA)	21	21
K Selvam (IND); S Singhi (IND)	9	5

Round of 16
Hsu Y-h (TPE); Lin J-y (TPE)	21	21
N Rakhmetullayeva (KAZ); K Smagulova (KAZ)	8	5
F D Kusuma (INA); M T Puspita Sari (INA)	16	21	9
2	Baek H-n (KOR); Lee S-h (KOR)	21	15	21

Quarter-finals
Hsu Y-h (TPE); Lin J-y (TPE)	20	17
2	Baek H-n (KOR); Lee S-h (KOR)	22	21

=== Finals ===
Semi-finals
1	Liu Shengshu (CHN); Tan Ning (CHN)	16	22	21
Pearly Tan (MAS); Thinaah Muralitharan (MAS)	21	20	12
Rin Uesaka (JPN); Kie Nakanishi (JPN)	13	12
2	Baek Ha-na (KOR); Lee So-hee (KOR)	21	21

Gold medal match
1	Liu Shengshu (CHN); Tan Ning (CHN)	28	18	18
2	Baek Ha-na (KOR); Lee So-hee (KOR)	26	21	21
