= Az Zahra Ditya Ramadhani =

Indonesian badminton player (born 2005)

Personal information
- Nickname: Ara
- Born: 19 October 2005 (age 21) Jakarta, Indonesia

Sport
- Country: Indonesia
- Sport: Badminton
- Handedness: Right

Women's & mixed doubles
- Highest ranking: 43 (WD with Thesya Munggaran) (29 July 2025)
- Current ranking: 71 (WD with Siti Sarah Azzahra); 355 (XD with Patra Harapan Rindorindo) (16 December 2025)
- BWF profile
Medal record
Women's badminton
Representing Indonesia
World Junior Championships
Bronze medal – third place	2022 Santander	Mixed team
Silver medal – second place	2023 Spokane	Mixed team
Asian Junior Championships
Silver medal – second place	2023 Yogyakarta	Mixed team

Az Zahra Ditya Ramadhani (born 19 October 2005) is an Indonesian badminton player affiliated with the Djarum club.

== Achievements ==
=== BWF World Tour (1 runner-up) ===
The BWF World Tour, which was announced on 19 March 2017 and implemented in 2018, is a series of elite badminton tournaments sanctioned by the Badminton World Federation (BWF). The BWF World Tour is divided into levels of World Tour Finals, Super 1000, Super 750, Super 500, Super 300, and the BWF Tour Super 100.

Women's doubles
Year	Tournament	Level	Partner	Opponent	Score	Result	Ref.
2025	Malaysia Super 100	Super 100	(Indonesia) Siti Sarah Azzahra	(China) Luo Yi (China) Wang Tingge	13–21, 12–21	(silver) Runner-up	

=== BWF International Challenge/Series (1 title, 1 runner-up) ===
Women's doubles
Year	Tournament	Partner	Opponent	Score	Result	Ref.
2024	Austrian Open	(Indonesia) Thesya Munggaran	(Chinese Taipei) Chen Yan-fei (Chinese Taipei) Sun Liang-ching	21–15, 21–15	(gold) Winner	

Mixed doubles
Year	Tournament	Partner	Opponent	Score	Result	Ref.
2025	Slovenia Open	(Indonesia) Patra Harapan Rindorindo	(Chinese Taipei) Wu Guan-xun (Chinese Taipei) Lee Chia-hsin	19–21, 13–21	(silver) Runner-up	

BWF International Challenge tournament
BWF International Series tournament
BWF Future Series tournament

=== BWF Junior International (1 runner-up) ===
Girls' doubles
Year	Tournament	Partner	Opponent	Score	Result	Ref.
2022	Alpes International	(Indonesia) Anisanaya Kamila	(Indonesia) Meilysa Trias Puspita Sari (Indonesia) Rachel Allessya Rose	17–21, 12–21	(silver) Runner-up	

BWF Junior International Grand Prix tournament
BWF Junior International Challenge tournament
BWF Junior International Series tournament
BWF Junior Future Series tournament

== Performance timeline ==
Key

W	Won	F	Finalist	SF	Semi-finalist
QF	Quarter-finalist	#R	Rounds 4, 3, 2, 1	RR	Round-robin stage
Q#	Qualification round	A	Absent	w/d	Withdrew
G	Gold	S	Silver	B	Bronze
NH	Not held	N/A	Not applicable	DNQ	Did not qualify

=== National team ===
- Junior level

Events	2022	2023	Ref
Asian Junior Championships	NH	S	
World Junior Championships	B	S	

=== Individual competitions ===
==== Junior level ====
- Girls' doubles

Events	2022	2023	Ref
Asian Junior Championships	NH	3R	
World Junior Championships	4R	4R	

==== Senior level ====
- Women's doubles

Tournament	BWF World Tour					Best	Ref
Tournament	2022	2023	2024	2025	2026	Best	Ref
Indonesia Masters	2R	Q2	A	1R	2R	2R ('22, '26)	
Ruichang China Masters	NH	A			QF	QF ('26)	
Indonesia Open	A			1R	A	1R ('25)	
Macau Open	NH		2R	A		2R ('24)	
Korea Masters	A			1R	A	1R ('25)	
Indonesia Masters Super 100	A	2R	SF	1R	A	SF ('24 I, '24 II)	
Indonesia Masters Super 100	A	2R	SF	QF		SF ('24 I, '24 II)	
Vietnam Open	A		QF	A		QF ('24)	
Malaysia Super 100	NH	A		F	A	F ('25)	
Kaohsiung Masters	NH	A		QF		QF ('25)	
Syed Modi International	A			1R		1R ('25)	
Guwahati Masters	NH	A		QF		QF ('25)	
Odisha Masters	A			QF		QF ('25)	
Year-end ranking	82	106	54	71		43	
Tournament	2022	2023	2024	2025	2026	Best	Ref
