= Meilysa Trias Puspita Sari =

Indonesian badminton player (born 2004)

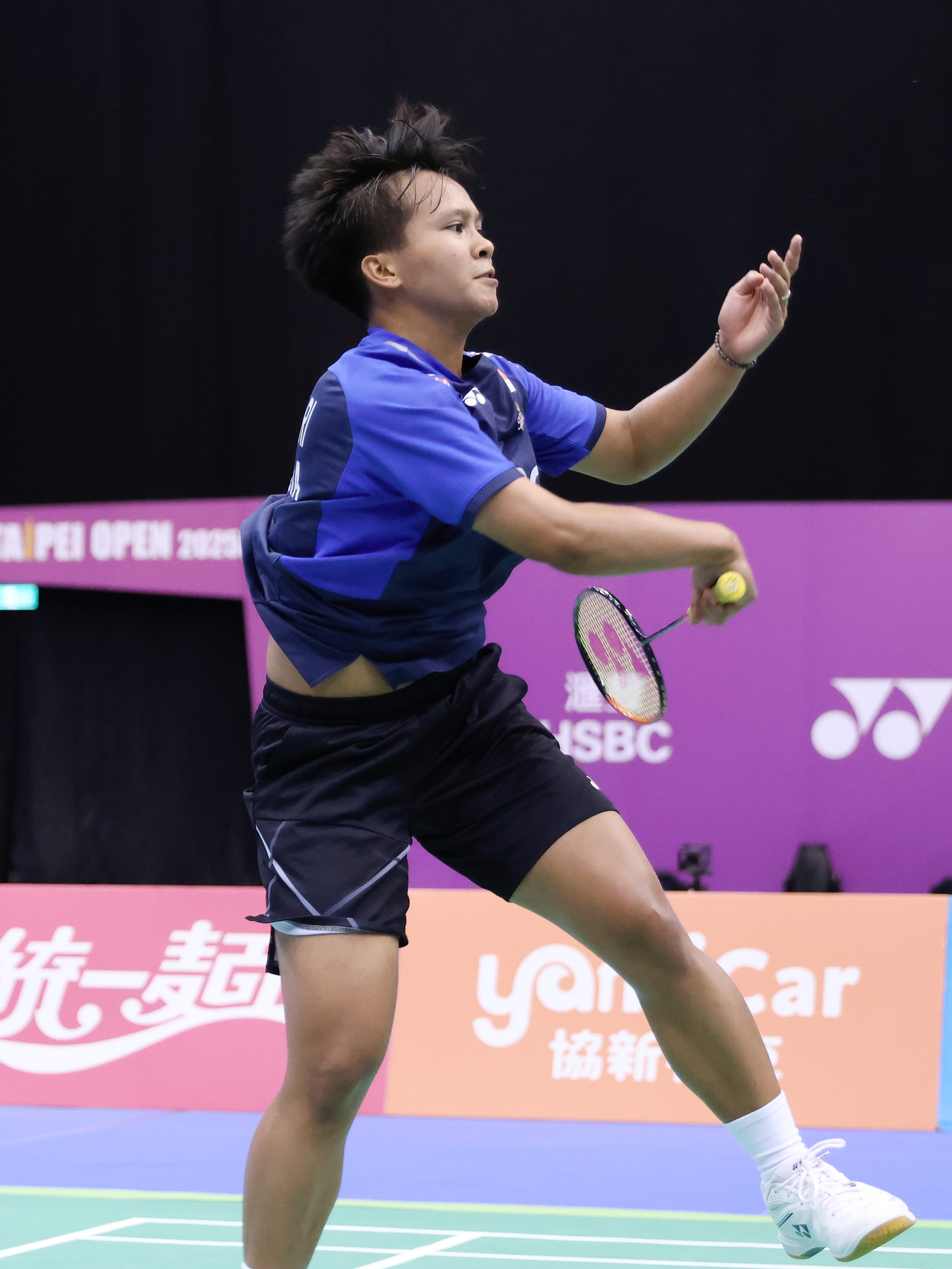
- Puspita Sari at the 2025 Taipei Open

Personal information
- Nickname: Trias
- Born: 11 May 2004 (age 22) Purwokerto, Banyumas, Central Java, Indonesia

Sport
- Country: Indonesia
- Sport: Badminton
- Handedness: Right

Women's doubles
- Highest ranking: 8 (with Febriana Dwipuji Kusuma, 20 October 2026); 24 (with Rachel Allessya Rose, 10 June 2025)
- Current ranking: 10 (with Febriana Dwipuji Kusuma, 3 November 2026)
- BWF profile
Medal record
Women's badminton
Representing Indonesia
Uber Cup
Silver medal – second place	2024 Chengdu	Women's team
Bronze medal – third place	2026 Horsens	Women's team
Asian Games
Bronze medal – third place	2026 Aichi–Nagoya	Women's team
Asia Mixed Team Championships
Gold medal – first place	2025 Qingdao	Mixed team
Asia Team Championships
Bronze medal – third place	2024 Selangor	Women's team
Bronze medal – third place	2026 Qingdao	Women's team
SEA Games
Silver medal – second place	2023 Cambodia	Women's doubles
Silver medal – second place	2023 Cambodia	Women's team
Silver medal – second place	2025 Thailand	Women's doubles
Silver medal – second place	2025 Thailand	Women's team
World Junior Championships
Silver medal – second place	2022 Santander	Girls' doubles
Bronze medal – third place	2022 Santander	Mixed team

Meilysa Trias Puspita Sari (born 11 May 2004) is an Indonesian badminton player. At the 2022 World Junior Championships, she won a silver in the girls' doubles and a bronze medal in the mixed team events.

== Career ==
=== 2022 ===
Puspita Sari and her partner Rachel Allessya Rose made their Badminton Asia Championships debut in April, but had to lose to Yuki Fukushima and Sayaka Hirota in the first round. In May, Puspita Sari and Rose won their first senior title at the Slovenian International. They also made a surprise win at the Indonesia Masters against experienced Indian pair Ashwini Ponnappa and N. Sikki Reddy in the first round, before bowing out to world no. 1 Chen Qingchen and Jia Yifan in the second round.

Puspita Sari and Rose participated at the World Junior Championships as the second seeds in the individual event, but lost to Liu Shengshu and Wang Tingge in the final.

=== 2023 ===
In January, Puspita Sari and Rose competed at their home tournament, Indonesia Masters, but had to lose in the first round from American pair Francesca Corbett and Allison Lee. In the next tournament, the Thailand Masters, they lost to Chinese pair Li Wenmei and Liu Xuanxuan in the second round.

In March, Puspita Sari and Rose competed in the Swiss Open but had to lose in the qualifying round from new Japanese pair Sayaka Hobara and Yui Suizu. In the next tour, they reached the quarter-finals in the Spain Masters, but had to lose to Chinese pair Liu Shengshu and Tan Ning.

In April, Puspita Sari and Rose competed at the Orléans Masters in France, but had to lose in the second round from English pair Chloe Birch and Lauren Smith. In late April, they competed at the Asian Championships in Dubai, United Arab Emirates, but had to lose in the second round from 1st seed Chinese pair Chen Qingchen and Jia Yifan.

In May, Puspita Sari competed at the 2023 SEA Games in Cambodia, and won the silver medals in the women's team and doubles event. In late May, they competed in the second Asian Tour at the Malaysia Masters. Unfortunately, they lost in the first round from 7th seed Japanese pair Mayu Matsumoto and Wakana Nagahara in straight games. In the next tour, they competed in the Thailand Open, but lost in the first round for second consecutive tournament, this time from Malaysian pair Vivian Hoo and Lim Chiew Sien in rubber games.

In June, Puspita Sari and Rose competed at the Singapore Open, but lost in the first round for third consecutive tournament, this time from 3rd seed Chinese pair Zhang Shuxian and Zheng Yu. In the next tour, they competed at the home tournament, Indonesia Open, but lost in the second round from 3rd seed Chinese pair Zhang Shuxian and Zheng Yu for two consecutive tour. In the next tour, they lost at the second round of the Taipei Open from 5th seed Korean pair Shin Seung-chan and Lee Yu-lim.

In September, Puspita Sari and Rose competed at the Indonesia Masters Super 100 I but lost at the quarter-finals from 7th seed Indian player Tanisha Crasto and Ashwini Ponnappa in rubber games.

=== 2024 ===
She was selected as a member of the Indonesian women's team at the Asia Team Championships in February, and the Uber Cup in May, where the team won a bronze medal at the Asian Championships, and then made history by reaching the final at the Uber Cup since 2008. In the final Indonesia lost to China 0–3.

=== 2025 ===
In 2025, Puspita Sari made her second appearance at the SEA Games, this time with her new partner Febriana Dwipuji Kusuma. Playing as the second women's doubles in the team event, they managed to help the team reach the final, but were defeated by defending champions Thailand, securing the silver medal. In individual women's doubles event, Puspita Sari and Kusuma managed to reach the final but lost against Pearly Tan and Thinaah Muralitharan.

=== 2026 ===
In 2026, Puspita Sari made her debut at the Asian Games in Aichi–Nagoya. She won the bronze medal in the women's team event. In the individual women's doubles, she and her partner Kusuma were knocked-out by number 2 seed Baek Ha-na and Lee So-hee in the early rounds.

== Achievements ==
=== SEA Games ===
Women's doubles
Year	Venue	Partner	Opponent	Score	Result	Ref.
2023	Morodok Techo Badminton Hall; Phnom Penh, Cambodia	(Indonesia) Rachel Allessya Rose	(Indonesia) Febriana Dwipuji Kusuma (Indonesia) Amalia Cahaya Pratiwi	17–21, 16–21	Silver	
2025	Gymnasium 4 Thammasat University Rangsit Campus; Pathum Thani, Thailand	(Indonesia) Febriana Dwipuji Kusuma	(Malaysia) Pearly Tan (Malaysia) Thinaah Muralitharan	16–21, 21–19, 17–21	Silver	

=== World Junior Championships ===
Girls' doubles
Year	Venue	Partner	Opponent	Score	Result	Ref.
2022	Palacio de Deportes de Santander; Santander, Spain	(Indonesia) Rachel Allessya Rose	(China) Liu Shengshu (China) Wang Tingge	14–21, 16–21	Silver	

=== BWF World Tour (2 titles, 3 runners-up) ===
The BWF World Tour, which was announced on 19 March 2017 and implemented in 2018, is a series of elite badminton tournaments sanctioned by the Badminton World Federation (BWF). The BWF World Tours are divided into levels of World Tour Finals, Super 1000, Super 750, Super 500, Super 300, and the BWF Tour Super 100.

Women's doubles
Year	Tournament	Level	Partner	Opponent	Score	Result	Ref.
2023 (II)	Indonesia Masters	Super 100	(Indonesia) Rachel Allessya Rose	(Indonesia) Lanny Tria Mayasari (Indonesia) Ribka Sugiarto	12–21, 16–21	(silver) Runner-up	
2023	Odisha Masters	Super 100	(Indonesia) Rachel Allessya Rose	(India) Tanisha Crasto (India) Ashwini Ponnappa	21–14, 21–17	(gold) Winner	
2024	Orléans Masters	Super 300	(Indonesia) Rachel Allessya Rose	(Japan) Rui Hirokami (Japan) Yuna Kato	21–12, 21–18	(gold) Winner	
2025	Australian Open	Super 500	(Indonesia) Febriana Dwipuji Kusuma	(Indonesia) Rachel Allessya Rose (Indonesia) Febi Setianingrum	21–18, 19–21, 21–23	(silver) Runner-up	
2026	Australian Open	Super 500	(Indonesia) Febriana Dwipuji Kusuma	(China) Jia Yifan (China) Zhang Shuxian	22–24, 13–21	(silver) Runner-up	

=== BWF International Challenge/Series (1 title) ===
Women's doubles
Year	Tournament	Partner	Opponent	Score	Result	Ref.
2022	Slovenian International	(Indonesia) Rachel Allessya Rose	(Italy) Martina Corsini (Italy) Judith Mair	21–18, 21–14	(gold) Winner	

BWF International Challenge tournament
BWF International Series tournament
BWF Future Series tournament

=== BWF Junior International (3 titles) ===
Girls' doubles
Year	Tournament	Partner	Opponent	Score	Result
2021	Denmark Junior	(Indonesia) Rachel Allessya Rose	(Indonesia) Savira Nurul Husnia (Indonesia) Kelly Larissa	21–7, 21–10	(gold) Winner
2021	Finnish Junior	(Indonesia) Rachel Allessya Rose	(Estonia) Catlyn Kruus (Estonia) Ramona Üprus	21–11, 21–15	(gold) Winner
2022	Alpes International	(Indonesia) Rachel Allessya Rose	(Indonesia) Anisanaya Kamila (Indonesia) Az Zahra Ditya Ramadhani	21–17, 21–12	(gold) Winner

BWF Junior International Grand Prix tournament
BWF Junior International Challenge tournament
BWF Junior International Series tournament
BWF Junior Future Series tournament

== Performance timeline ==
Key

W	Won	F	Finalist	SF	Semi-finalist
QF	Quarter-finalist	#R	Rounds 4, 3, 2, 1	RR	Round-robin stage
Q#	Qualification round	A	Absent	w/d	Withdrew
G	Gold	S	Silver	B	Bronze
NH	Not held	N/A	Not applicable	DNQ	Did not qualify

=== National team ===
- Junior level

Team events	2022	Ref
World Junior Championships	B	

- Senior level

Team events	2023	2024	2025	2026	Ref
SEA Games	S	NH	S	NH	
Asia Team Championships	NH	B	NH	B	
Asia Mixed Team Championships	A	NH	G	NH	
Asian Games	NH			B	
Uber Cup	NH	S	NH	B	

=== Individual competitions ===
==== Junior level ====
- Girls' doubles

Events	2022	Ref
World Junior Championships	S	

==== Senior level ====
- Women's doubles

Event	2022	2023	2024	2025	2026	Ref
SEA Games	NH	S	NH	S	NH	
Asian Championships	1R	2R	1R	1R	1R	
Asian Games	A	NH			2R	
World Championships	DNQ	DNQ	NH	DNQ	QF	

Tournament	BWF World Tour					Best	Ref
Tournament	2022	2023	2024	2025	2026	Best	Ref
Malaysia Open	A				QF	QF ('26)	
Indonesia Masters	2R	1R	2R	1R	2R	2R ('22, '24, '26)	
Thailand Masters	NH	2R	1R	SF	SF	SF ('25, '26)	
German Open	A			2R	A	2R ('25)	
All England Open	A				QF	QF ('26)	
Swiss Open	A	Q1	1R	A	2R	2R ('26)	
Orléans Masters	A	2R	W	2R	2R	W ('24)	
Thailand Open	A	1R	w/d	QF	A	QF ('25)	
Malaysia Masters	A	1R	A	1R	A	1R ('23, '25)	
Singapore Open	1R	1R	A			1R ('22, '23)	
Indonesia Open	A	2R	A	1R	QF	QF ('26)	
Australian Open	2R	A		F	F	F ('25, '26)	
Macau Open	NH		A	SF	A	SF ('25)	
Japan Open	A				QF	QF ('26)	
China Open	NH	A			1R	1R ('26)	
Taipei Open	A	2R	A	SF	A	SF ('25)	
China Masters	NH	A		1R	A	1R ('25)	
Indonesia Masters Super 100	A	QF	A			F ('23)	
Indonesia Masters Super 100	A	F	A			F ('23)	
Arctic Open	NH	A		2R	A	2R ('25)	
Denmark Open	A			2R	1R	2R ('25)	
French Open	A		1R	2R	1R	2R ('25)	
Hylo Open	A				QF	QF ('26)	
Japan Masters	NH	A			QF	QF ('26)	
Hong Kong Open	NH	A		2R	1R	2R ('25)	
Guwahati Masters	NH	QF	A			QF ('23)	
Odisha Masters	A	W	A			W ('23)	
Spain Masters	NH	QF	A	NH		QF ('23)	
Year-end ranking	58	34	64	30		8	
Tournament	2022	2023	2024	2025	2026	Best	Ref
