= Thesya Munggaran =

Indonesian badminton player (born 2004)

Personal information
- Full name: Arlya Nabilla Thesa Munggaran
- Nickname: Thesa
- Born: 7 December 2004 (age 21) Garut, West Java, Indonesia

Sport
- Country: Indonesia
- Sport: Badminton
- Handedness: Right

Women's & mixed doubles
- Highest ranking: 43 (WD with Az Zahra Ditya Ramadhani, 29 July 2025); 43 (XD with Bimo Prasetyo, 9 June 2026)
- Current ranking: 48 (XD with Bimo Prasetyo, 29 September 2026)
- BWF profile

Arlya Nabila Thesya Munggaran (born 7 December 2004) is an Indonesian badminton player affiliated with the Mutiara Cardinal club.

== Achievements ==
=== BWF International Challenge/Series (4 titles, 3 runners-up) ===
Women's doubles
Year	Tournament	Partner	Opponent	Score	Result	Ref.
2024	Austrian Open	(Indonesia) Az Zahra Ditya Ramadhani	(Chinese Taipei) Chen Yan-fei (Chinese Taipei) Sun Liang-ching	21–15, 21–15	(gold) Winner	

Mixed doubles
Year	Tournament	Partner	Opponent	Score	Result	Ref.
2025	Austrian Open	(Indonesia) Bimo Prasetyo	(Spain) Ruben García (Spain) Lucia Rodríguez	17–21, 18–21	(silver) Runner-up	
2025	Ghana International	(Indonesia) Bimo Prasetyo	(Indonesia) M. Nawaf Khoiriyansyah (Indonesia) Nahya Muhyifa	21–7, 21–18	(gold) Winner	
2025	Cameroon International	(Indonesia) Bimo Prasetyo	(Indonesia) M. Nawaf Khoiriyansyah (Indonesia) Nahya Muhyifa	12–21, 21–11, 19–21	(silver) Runner-up	
2025	Lagos International	(Indonesia) Bimo Prasetyo	(India) Dhruv Rawat (India) K. Maneesha	21–15, 21–17	(gold) Winner	
2025	Dutch Open	(Indonesia) Bimo Prasetyo	(Denmark) Kristoffer Kolding (Denmark) Mette Werge	11–21, 20–22	(silver) Runner-up	
2025	Astana International	(Indonesia) Bimo Prasetyo	(Serbia) Mihajlo Tomić (Serbia) Andjela Vitman	19–21, 21–14, 21–13	(gold) Winner	
2026 (III)	Indonesia International	(Indonesia) Bimo Prasetyo	(Indonesia) Muhammad Al Farizi (Indonesia) Jessica Maya Rismawardani	0–0, 0–0		

BWF International Challenge tournament
BWF International Series tournament
BWF Future Series tournament

== Performance timeline ==
Key

W	Won	F	Finalist	SF	Semi-finalist
QF	Quarter-finalist	#R	Rounds 4, 3, 2, 1	RR	Round-robin stage
Q#	Qualification round	A	Absent	w/d	Withdrew
G	Gold	S	Silver	B	Bronze
NH	Not held	N/A	Not applicable	DNQ	Did not qualify

=== Individual competitions ===
==== Junior level ====
- Girls' doubles

Events	2022
World Junior Championships	4R

==== Senior level ====
===== Women's doubles =====
Tournament	BWF World Tour				Best	Ref
Tournament	2022	2023	2024	2025	Best	Ref
Indonesia Masters	2R	A		1R	2R ('22)	
Indonesia Open	A			1R	1R ('25)	
Macau Open	NH		2R	A	2R ('24)	
Vietnam Open	A		QF	A	QF ('24)	
Indonesia Masters Super 100	A	2R	SF	A	SF ('24 I, '24 II)	
Indonesia Masters Super 100	A	1R	SF	A	SF ('24 I, '24 II)	
Odisha Masters	A	SF	A		SF ('23)	
Year-end ranking	144	116	54	140	43	
Tournament	2022	2023	2024	2025	Best	Ref

===== Mixed doubles =====
Events	2026	Ref
World Championships	2R	

Tournament	BWF World Tour		Best	Ref
Tournament	2025	2026	Best	Ref
Indonesia Masters	A	1R	1R ('26)	
Ruichang China Masters	A	2R	2R ('26)	
Baoji China Masters	A	SF	SF ('26	
Indonesia Masters Super 100	A	2R	SF ('26 II)	
Indonesia Masters Super 100	A	SF	SF ('26 II)	
Guwahati Masters	2R		2R ('25)	
Odisha Masters	QF		QF ('25)	
Year-end ranking	50		43	
Tournament	2025	2026	Best	Ref
