= 2026 Indonesia Masters =

Badminton tournament in Indonesia

Tournament details
- Dates: 20–25 January
- Edition: 16th
- Level: Super 500
- Total prize money: US$500,000
- Venue: Istora Senayan
- Location: Jakarta, Indonesia

Champions
- Men's singles: (Indonesia) Alwi Farhan
- Women's singles: (China) Chen Yufei
- Men's doubles: (Malaysia) Goh Sze Fei (Malaysia) Nur Izzuddin
- Women's doubles: (Malaysia) Pearly Tan (Malaysia) Thinaah Muralitharan
- Mixed doubles: (Malaysia) Chen Tang Jie (Malaysia) Toh Ee Wei

The 2026 Indonesia Masters (officially known as the Daihatsu Indonesia Masters 2026 for sponsorship reasons) was a badminton tournament, which took place at the Istora Senayan, Jakarta, Indonesia, from 20 to 25 January 2026. The tournament had a total prize pool of US$500,000.

== Tournament ==
The 2026 Indonesia Masters was the third tournament of the 2026 BWF World Tour and is part of the Indonesia Masters championships, which have been held since 2010. This tournament is organized by the Badminton Association of Indonesia with sanction from the BWF.

The BWF's Time Clock system was tested at the tournament after being implemented in all qualifying matches at the 2025 Australian Open. At the Indonesia Masters, the system was used for all qualifying and main-draw matches. Under the regulations, the clock started when the umpire updated the score, and players had 25 seconds to be ready to serve or receive. Umpires retained discretion to allow additional time in circumstances such as medical intervention or extended court mopping.

=== Venue ===
This tournament was held at the Istora Senayan in Jakarta, Indonesia.

=== Point distribution ===
Below is the point distribution for each phase of the tournament based on the BWF points system for the BWF World Tour Super 500 event.

Winner	Runner-up	3/4	5/8	9/16	17/32	33/64	65/128
9,200	7,800	6,420	5,040	3,600	2,220	880	430

=== Prize pool ===
The total prize money is US$500,000 with the distribution of the prize money in accordance with BWF regulations.

Event	Winner	Finalist	Semi-finals	Quarter-finals	Last 16
Singles	$37,500	$19,000	$7,250	$3,000	$1,750
Doubles	$39,500	$19,000	$7,000	$3,625	$1,875

== Men's singles ==
=== Seeds ===
1. (Thailand) Kunlavut Vitidsarn (withdrew)
2. (Denmark) Anders Antonsen (second round)
3. (Indonesia) Jonatan Christie (withdrew)
4. (Chinese Taipei) Chou Tien-chen (quarter-finals)
5. (Japan) Kodai Naraoka (withdrew)
6. (Singapore) Loh Kean Yew (semi-finals)
7. (India) Lakshya Sen (quarter-finals)
8. (Indonesia) Alwi Farhan (champion)

=== Finals ===
Semi-finals
6	(Singapore) Loh Kean Yew	17	17
PFQ	(Thailand) Panitchaphon Teeraratsakul	21	21
8	(Indonesia) Alwi Farhan	21	21
(Chinese Taipei) Chi Yu-jen	11	12

Final
PFQ	(Thailand) Panitchaphon Teeraratsakul	5	6
8	(Indonesia) Alwi Farhan	21	21

=== Top half ===
==== Section 1 ====
First round
4	(Chinese Taipei) Chou T-c	21	21
(Republic of Ireland) N Nguyen	14	15
(Japan) K Watanabe	15	23	22
(India) S Kidambi	21	21	24
6	(Singapore) Loh K Y	21	21
PFQ	(Denmark) M Johannesen	13	12
PFQ	(Indonesia) Z Ubaidillah	21	21
PFQ	(India) K George	17	14

Second round
4	(Chinese Taipei) Chou T-c	21	21
(India) S Kidambi	11	10
6	(Singapore) Loh K Y	21	21
PFQ	(Indonesia) Z Ubaidillah	19	10

Quarter-finals
4	(Chinese Taipei) Chou T-c	13	18
6	(Singapore) Loh K Y	21	21

==== Section 2 ====
First round
7	(India) L Sen	21	16	21
(Chinese Taipei) Wang T-w	13	21	14
PFQ	(Chinese Taipei) Su L-y	21	17	13
PFQ	(Hong Kong) J Gunawan	19	21	21
SWM	(Chinese Taipei) Lee C-h	10	18
PFQ	(Thailand) P Teeraratsakul	21	21
(Malaysia) Lee Z J	21	21
(India) Prannoy H. S.	19	11

Second round
7	(India) L Sen	21	21
PFQ	(Hong Kong) J Gunawan	10	11
PFQ	(Thailand) P Teeraratsakul	15	21	21
(Malaysia) Lee Z J	21	17	8

Quarter-finals
7	(India) L Sen	18	20
PFQ	(Thailand) P Teeraratsakul	21	22

=== Bottom half ===
==== Section 3 ====
First round
Q1	(Indonesia) M Yusuf	11	17
Q2	(Chinese Taipei) Wang P-w	21	21
(France) A Merklé	18	21	16
SWM	(Japan) Y Tanaka	21	11	21
(China) Wang ZX	21	21
(Malaysia) J Hoh	15	11
(India) A Shetty	8	13
8	(Indonesia) A Farhan	21	21

Second round
Q2	(Chinese Taipei) Wang P-w	21	19	13
SWM	(Japan) Y Tanaka	12	21	21
(China) Wang ZX	21	19	16
8	(Indonesia) A Farhan	15	21	21

Quarter-finals
SWM	(Japan) Y Tanaka	20	16
8	(Indonesia) A Farhan	22	21

==== Section 4 ====
First round
Q3	(Indonesia) A S Ginting	12	21	21
Q4	(Belgium) J Carraggi	21	15	10
(Hong Kong) Ng K L	16	7
SWM	(Singapore) J Teh	21	21
(Chinese Taipei) Chi Y-j	w	/	o
(Denmark) R Gemke
(Canada) B Yang	16	14
2	(Denmark) A Antonsen	21	21

Second round
Q3	(Indonesia) A S Ginting
SWM	(Singapore) J Teh	w	/	o
(Chinese Taipei) Chi Y-j	21	18	21
2	(Denmark) A Antonsen	11	21	13

Quarter-finals
SWM	(Singapore) J Teh	18	21	13
(Chinese Taipei) Chi Y-j	21	13	21

== Women's singles ==
=== Seeds ===
1. (China) Chen Yufei (champion)
2. (Indonesia) Putri Kusuma Wardani (second round)
3. (Thailand) Ratchanok Intanon (quarter-finals)
4. (Japan) Tomoka Miyazaki (second round)
5. (India) P. V. Sindhu (quarter-finals)
6. (Canada) Michelle Li (second round)
7. (Chinese Taipei) Chiu Pin-chian (second round)
8. (Thailand) Busanan Ongbamrungphan (first round)

=== Finals ===
Semi-finals
1	(China) Chen Yufei	21	24
(Japan) Nozomi Okuhara	15	22
(Thailand) Pitchamon Opatniputh	21	21
(Malaysia) Letshanaa Karupathevan	15	17

Final
1	(China) Chen Yufei	23	21
(Thailand) Pitchamon Opatniputh	21	13

=== Top half ===
==== Section 1 ====
First round
1	(China) Chen YF	21	21
PFQ	(Ukraine) P Buhrova	8	6
(Denmark) J D Jakobsen	8	22	21
Q4	(India) A Kashyap	21	20	17
5	(India) P. V. Sindhu	22	21
(Japan) M Suizu	20	18
(Denmark) L Kjærsfeldt	15	21	21
(China) Han QX	21	15	8

Second round
1	(China) Chen YF	21	21
(Denmark) J D Jakobsen	7	9
5	(India) P. V. Sindhu	21	21
(Denmark) L Kjærsfeldt	19	18

Quarter-finals
1	(China) Chen YF	21	21
5	(India) P. V. Sindhu	13	17

==== Section 2 ====
First round
3	(Thailand) R Intanon	21	21
Q3	(Denmark) A Schulz	10	17
(Thailand) S Katethong	22	21
(Denmark) L Christophersen	20	18
8	(Thailand) B Ongbamrungphan	18	13
(Japan) N Okuhara	21	21
(Chinese Taipei) Pai Y-p	16	17
Q2	(India) A Kharb	21	21

Second round
3	(Thailand) R Intanon	18	8
(Thailand) S Katethong	21	3^{r}
(Japan) N Okuhara	16	21	21
Q2	(India) A Kharb	21	14	11

Quarter-finals
3	(Thailand) R Intanon	21	20^{r}
(Japan) N Okuhara	15	22

=== Bottom half ===
==== Section 3 ====
First round
(Vietnam) Nguyễn T L	21	21
(Chinese Taipei) Lin H-t	14	11
(United States) BW Zhang	21	18	11
7	(Chinese Taipei) Chiu P-c	16	21	21
(Thailand) P Opatniputh	20	21	21
Q1	(Malaysia) Wong L C	22	13	12
(India) T Sharma	21	18	16
4	(Japan) T Miyazaki	18	21	21

Second round
(Vietnam) Nguyễn T L	21	23
7	(Chinese Taipei) Chiu P-c	17	21
(Thailand) P Opatniputh	21	21
4	(Japan) T Miyazaki	10	13

Quarter-finals
(Vietnam) Nguyễn T L	21	24	12
(Thailand) P Opatniputh	18	26	21

==== Section 4 ====
First round
(Malaysia) Letshanaa K	9	21	22
(Chinese Taipei) Hsu W-c	21	12	20
(India) M Bansod	21	12
6	(Canada) M Li	23	21
(Chinese Taipei) Tung C-t	15	18
(Chinese Taipei) Huang Y-h	21	21
(Chinese Taipei) Sung S-y	15	15
2	(Indonesia) P K Wardani	21	21

Second round
(Malaysia) Letshanaa K	21	21
6	(Canada) M Li	14	14
(Chinese Taipei) Huang Y-h	21	19	21
2	(Indonesia) P K Wardani	17	21	17

Quarter-finals
(Malaysia) Letshanaa K	21	21
(Chinese Taipei) Huang Y-h	17	18

== Men's doubles ==
=== Seeds ===
1. (Malaysia) Aaron Chia / Soh Wooi Yik (first round)
2. (Indonesia) Fajar Alfian / Muhammad Shohibul Fikri (quarter-finals)
3. (Malaysia) Man Wei Chong / Tee Kai Wun (quarter-finals)
4. (Malaysia) Goh Sze Fei / Nur Izzuddin (champions)
5. (Indonesia) Sabar Karyaman Gutama / Muhammad Reza Pahlevi Isfahani (semi-finals)
6. (Denmark) Kim Astrup / Anders Skaarup Rasmussen (first round)
7. (England) Ben Lane / Sean Vendy (second round)
8. (Chinese Taipei) Lee Jhe-huei / Yang Po-hsuan (second round)

=== Finals ===
Semi-finals
(Denmark) Daniel Lundgaard (Denmark) Mads Vestergaard	9	15
4	(Malaysia) Goh Sze Fei (Malaysia) Nur Izzuddin	21	21
5	(Indonesia) Sabar Karyaman Gutama (Indonesia) Muhammad Reza Pahlevi Isfahani	19	14
(Indonesia) Raymond Indra (Indonesia) Nikolaus Joaquin	21	21

Final
4	(Malaysia) Goh Sze Fei (Malaysia) Nur Izzuddin	21	21
(Indonesia) Raymond Indra (Indonesia) Nikolaus Joaquin	19	13

=== Top half ===
==== Section 1 ====
First round
1	(Malaysia) A Chia (Malaysia) Soh W Y	22	19	16
(Denmark) D Lundgaard (Denmark) M Vestergaard	20	21	21
Q3	(Chinese Taipei) Chen C-k (Chinese Taipei) Lin B-w	14	21	18
(Japan) H Midorikawa (Japan) K Yamashita	21	18	21
6	(Denmark) K Astrup (Denmark) A S Rasmussen	16	26
(China) Hu KY (China) Lin XY	21	28
PFQ	(Thailand) K Kedren (Thailand) L Wedler	26	19	13
(South Korea) Choi S-g (Malaysia) Goh V S	24	21	21

Second round
(Denmark) D Lundgaard (Denmark) M Vestergaard	30	15	21
(Japan) H Midorikawa (Japan) K Yamashita	28	21	19
(China) Hu KY (China) Lin XY	23	21
(South Korea) Choi S-g (Malaysia) Goh V S	25	23

Quarter-finals
(Denmark) D Lundgaard (Denmark) M Vestergaard	15	22	21
(South Korea) Choi S-g (Malaysia) Goh V S	21	20	14

==== Section 2 ====
First round
4	(Malaysia) Goh S F (Malaysia) N Izzuddin	21	21
(United States) Chen Z-y (United States) P Smith	15	17
Q2	(Singapore) W Koh (Singapore) J Kubo	12	21	19
(Chinese Taipei) Liu K-h (Chinese Taipei) Yang P-ha	21	16	21
7	(England) B Lane (England) S Vendy	17	21	21
(Malaysia) Choong H J (Malaysia) M Haikal	21	17	3
Q1	(Thailand) P Sukphun (Thailand) Pak Teeraratsakul	18	21
(South Korea) Cho S-h (South Korea) Lee J-m	21	23

Second round
4	(Malaysia) Goh S F (Malaysia) N Izzuddin	17	21	21
(Chinese Taipei) Liu K-h (Chinese Taipei) Yang P-ha	21	14	16
7	(England) B Lane (England) S Vendy	16	15
(South Korea) Cho S-h (South Korea) Lee J-m	21	21

Quarter-finals
4	(Malaysia) Goh S F (Malaysia) N Izzuddin	21	21
(South Korea) Cho S-h (South Korea) Lee J-m	17	13

=== Bottom half ===
==== Section 3 ====
First round
(Malaysia) N M Azriyn A (Malaysia) Tan W K	21	21
(Chinese Taipei) Lee F-c (Chinese Taipei) Lee F-j	13	18
(Malaysia) Chia W J (Malaysia) Lwi S H	18	21	10
5	(Indonesia) S K Gutama (Indonesia) M R P Isfahani	21	19	21
(India) H Amsakarunan (India) Arjun M. R.	21	21
Q4	(Indonesia) A F Rayhan (Indonesia) D A Wahyudi	19	13
PFQ	(Chinese Taipei) Chang K-c (Chinese Taipei) Po L-w	13	6
3	(Malaysia) Man W C (Malaysia) Tee K W	21	21

Second round
(Malaysia) N M Azriyn A (Malaysia) Tan W K	21	16	17
5	(Indonesia) S K Gutama (Indonesia) M R Isfahani	19	21	21
(India) H Amsakarunan (India) Arjun M. R.	17	21	16
3	(Malaysia) Man W C (Malaysia) Tee K W	21	9	21

Quarter-finals
5	(Indonesia) S K Gutama (Indonesia) M R Isfahani	22	21
3	(Malaysia) Man W C (Malaysia) Tee K W	20	19

==== Section 4 ====
First round
(France) É Adam (France) L Rossi	20	21	10
(Indonesia) R Indra (Indonesia) N Joaquin	22	15	21
(Malaysia) Ong Y S (Malaysia) Teo E Y	18	15
8	(Chinese Taipei) Lee J-h (Chinese Taipei) Yang P-hs	21	21
(Indonesia) L R Carnando (Indonesia) B Maulana	21	21
(Chinese Taipei) He Z-w (Chinese Taipei) Huang J-h	16	16
(Chinese Taipei) Chen Z-r (Chinese Taipei) Lin Y-c	16	10
2	(Indonesia) F Alfian (Indonesia) M S Fikri	21	21

Second round
(Indonesia) R Indra (Indonesia) N Joaquin	14	21	24
8	(Chinese Taipei) Lee J-h (Chinese Taipei) Yang P-hs	21	18	22
(Indonesia) L R Carnando (Indonesia) B Maulana	16	21	13
2	(Indonesia) F Alfian (Indonesia) M S Fikri	21	18	21

Quarter-finals
(Indonesia) R Indra (Indonesia) N Joaquin	18	21	21
2	(Indonesia) F Alfian (Indonesia) M S Fikri	21	19	14

== Women's doubles ==
=== Seeds ===
1. (Malaysia) Pearly Tan / Thinaah Muralitharan (champions)
2. (Chinese Taipei) Hsu Yin-hui / Lin Jhih-yun (first round)
3. (Chinese Taipei) Chang Ching-hui / Yang Ching-tun (first round)
4. (Chinese Taipei) Hsu Ya-ching / Sung Yu-hsuan (quarter-finals)
5. (Indonesia) Febriana Dwipuji Kusuma / Meilysa Trias Puspita Sari (second round)
6. (Japan) Kaho Osawa / Mai Tanabe (second round)
7. (Indonesia) Rachel Allessya Rose / Febi Setianingrum (semi-finals)
8. (China) Bao Lijing / Li Yijing (first round)

=== Finals ===
Semi-finals
1	(Malaysia) Pearly Tan (Malaysia) Thinaah Muralitharan	21	21
(Indonesia) Lanny Tria Mayasari (Indonesia) Apriyani Rahayu	15	9
7	(Indonesia) Rachel Allessya Rose (Indonesia) Febi Setianingrum	12	21	13
(Japan) Arisa Igarashi (Japan) Miyu Takahashi	21	19	21

Final
1	(Malaysia) Pearly Tan (Malaysia) Thinaah Muralitharan	w	/	o
(Japan) Arisa Igarashi (Japan) Miyu Takahashi

=== Top half ===
==== Section 1 ====
First round
1	(Malaysia) P Tan (Malaysia) Thinaah M	21	20	21
(United States) F Corbett (United States) J Gai	15	22	19
(Ukraine) P Buhrova (Ukraine) Y Kantemyr	7	17
(Chinese Taipei) Lin X-m (Chinese Taipei) Wang Y-q	21	21
6	(Japan) K Osawa (Japan) M Tanabe	21	21
(Malaysia) Ong X Y (Malaysia) C Ting	19	18
(South Korea) Kim Y-j (South Korea) Lee Y-l	21	21
(Chinese Taipei) Chen Y-h (Chinese Taipei) Liu C-y	15	13

Second round
1	(Malaysia) P Tan (Malaysia) Thinaah M	21	21
(Chinese Taipei) Lin X-m (Chinese Taipei) Wang Y-q	13	12
6	(Japan) K Osawa (Japan) M Tanabe	13	8
(South Korea) Kim Y-j (South Korea) Lee Y-l	21	21

Quarter-finals
1	(Malaysia) P Tan (Malaysia) Thinaah M	21	21
(South Korea) Kim Y-j (South Korea) Lee Y-l	15	9

==== Section 2 ====
First round
4	(Chinese Taipei) Hsu Y-c (Chinese Taipei) Sung Y-h	15	22	21
(Indonesia) I S Meida (Indonesia) R K Nastine	21	20	14
Q3	(Malaysia) Cheng S H (Malaysia) Tan Z Y	22	21
Q2	(Denmark) K Vang (Denmark) M Werge	20	13
8	(China) Bao LJ (China) Li YJ	14	13
(Indonesia) L T Mayasari (Indonesia) A Rahayu	21	21
Q4	(Malaysia) Chong J Y (Malaysia) V Ng	16	10
(Hong Kong) Tsang H Y (Hong Kong) Yeung P L	21	21

Second round
4	(Chinese Taipei) Hsu Y-c (Chinese Taipei) Sung Y-h	w	/	o
Q3	(Malaysia) Cheng S H (Malaysia) Tan Z Y
(Indonesia) L T Mayasari (Indonesia) A Rahayu	21	21
(Hong Kong) Tsang H Y (Hong Kong) Yeung P L	17	18

Quarter-finals
4	(Chinese Taipei) Hsu Y-c (Chinese Taipei) Sung Y-h	23	18	19
(Indonesia) L T Mayasari (Indonesia) A Rahayu	21	21	21

=== Bottom half ===
==== Section 3 ====
First round
(Indonesia) S S Azzahra (Indonesia) A Z D Ramadhani	23	21
(Denmark) N Anthonisen (Denmark) A C Kudsk	21	16
(Poland) P Cybulska (Poland) K Marczak	13	9
7	(Indonesia) R A Rose (Indonesia) F Setianingrum	21	21
(China) Luo XM (China) Wang YD	21	21
(Chinese Taipei) Chen S-y (Chinese Taipei) Hsieh Y-e	9	15
(Hong Kong) Fan K Y (Hong Kong) Yau M Y	21	16	21
3	(Chinese Taipei) Chang C-h (Chinese Taipei) Yang C-t	17	21	15

Second round
(Indonesia) S S Azzahra (Indonesia) A Z D Ramadhani	21	14	16
7	(Indonesia) R A Rose (Indonesia) F Setianingrum	19	21	21
(China) Luo XM (China) Wang YD	21	21
(Hong Kong) Fan K Y (Hong Kong) Yau M Y	12	9

Quarter-finals
7	(Indonesia) R A Rose (Indonesia) F Setianingrum	18	21	21
(China) Luo XM (China) Wang YD	21	16	10

==== Section 4 ====
First round
(Japan) A Igarashi (Japan) M Takahashi	21	21
Q1	(China) Keng SL (China) Li HZ	18	13
(Hong Kong) Lui L L (Hong Kong) Yeung N T	21	14	17
5	(Indonesia) F D Kusuma (Indonesia) M T Puspita Sari	16	21	21
(Indonesia) A C Pratiwi (Indonesia) S F S Ramadhanti	21	21
(Thailand) O Jongsathapornpan (Thailand) S Suwachai	8	15
(Thailand) H Mijad (Thailand) N Tungkasatan	23	21
2	(Chinese Taipei) Hsu Y-h (Chinese Taipei) Lin J-y	21	15

Second round
(Japan) A Igarashi (Japan) M Takahashi	21	21
5	(Indonesia) F D Kusuma (Indonesia) M T Puspita Sari	15	8
(Indonesia) A C Pratiwi (Indonesia) S F S Ramadhanti	21	21
(Thailand) H Mijad (Thailand) N Tungkasatan	17	14

Quarter-finals
(Japan) A Igarashi (Japan) M Takahashi	16	21	21
(Indonesia) A C Pratiwi (Indonesia) S F S Ramadhanti	21	11	14

== Mixed doubles ==
=== Seeds ===
1. (China) Feng Yanzhe / Huang Dongping (withdrew)
2. (China) Jiang Zhenbang / Wei Yaxin (semi-finals)
3. (Malaysia) Chen Tang Jie / Toh Ee Wei (champions)
4. (France) Thom Gicquel / Delphine Delrue (quarter-finals)
5. (China) Guo Xinwa / Chen Fanghui (quarter-finals)
6. (Indonesia) Jafar Hidayatullah / Felisha Pasaribu (semi-finals)
7. (Malaysia) Goh Soon Huat / Shevon Jemie Lai (first round)
8. (Denmark) Jesper Toft / Amalie Magelund (second round)

=== Finals ===
Semi-finals
6	(Indonesia) Jafar Hidayatullah (Indonesia) Felisha Pasaribu	22	19	17
SWM	(Denmark) Mathias Christiansen (Denmark) Alexandra Bøje	20	21	21
3	(Malaysia) Chen Tang Jie (Malaysia) Toh Ee Wei	21	21
2	(China) Jiang Zhenbang (China) Wei Yaxin	17	12

Final
SWM	(Denmark) Mathias Christiansen (Denmark) Alexandra Bøje	21	17	11
3	(Malaysia) Chen Tang Jie (Malaysia) Toh Ee Wei	15	21	21

=== Top half ===
==== Section 1 ====
First round
4	(France) T Gicquel (France) D Delrue	21	22
(India) R Kapoor (India) R Gadde	9	20
(India) D Kapila (India) T Crasto	23	20	6
(France) J Maio (France) L Palermo	21	22	21
6	(Indonesia) J Hidayatullah (Indonesia) F Pasaribu	21	21
Q3	(Denmark) K Kolding (Denmark) M Werge	14	19
(Indonesia) D Ferdinansyah (Indonesia) B Wardana	21	21
(Malaysia) J Wong (Malaysia) Lai P J	10	17

Second round
4	(France) T Gicquel (France) D Delrue	21	21
(France) J Maio (France) L Palermo	12	8
6	(Indonesia) J Hidayatullah (Indonesia) F Pasaribu	10	21	21
(Indonesia) D Ferdinansyah (Indonesia) B Wardana	21	11	10

Quarter-finals
4	(France) T Gicquel (France) D Delrue	21	20	16
6	(Indonesia) J Hidayatullah (Indonesia) F Pasaribu	13	22	21

==== Section 2 ====
First round
5	(China) Guo XW (China) Chen FH	22	21
PFQ	(Chinese Taipei) Liu K-h (Chinese Taipei) Jheng Y-c	20	16
(Thailand) P Horbanluekit (Thailand) B Aimsaard	21	6	17
(Malaysia) Hoo P R (Malaysia) Cheng S Y	13	21	21
SWM	(Denmark) M Christiansen (Denmark) A Bøje	21	15	21
Q1	(Indonesia) B Prasetyo (Indonesia) T Munggaran	8	21	12
(United States) P Smith (United States) J Gai	15	9
Q4	(Japan) Y Watanabe (Japan) M Taguchi	21	21

Second round
5	(China) Guo XW (China) Chen FH	21	21
(Malaysia) Hoo P R (Malaysia) Cheng S Y	13	19
SWM	(Denmark) M Christiansen (Denmark) A Bøje	21	21
Q4	(Japan) Y Watanabe (Japan) M Taguchi	13	17

Quarter-finals
5	(China) Guo XW (China) Chen FH	18	14
SWM	(Denmark) M Christiansen (Denmark) A Bøje	21	21

=== Bottom half ===
==== Section 3 ====
First round
(China) Cheng X (China) Zhang C	13	22	13
(Singapore) T Hee (Indonesia) G E Widjaja	21	20	21
(Indonesia) B Setiabudi (Indonesia) M D Oktavianti	19	15
8	(Denmark) J Toft (Denmark) A Magelund	21	21
(Thailand) P Teeraratsakul (Thailand) S Taerattanachai	21	15	21
(Indonesia) A Syahnawi (Indonesia) N V Marwah	12	21	10
Q2	(China) Zhu YJ (China) Li Q	19	22	10
3	(Malaysia) Chen T J (Malaysia) Toh E W	21	20	21

Second round
(Singapore) T Hee (Indonesia) G E Widjaja	21	16	21
8	(Denmark) J Toft (Denmark) A Magelund	12	21	14
(Thailand) P Teeraratsakul (Thailand) S Taerattanachai	12	18
3	(Malaysia) Chen T J (Malaysia) Toh E W	21	21

Quarter-finals
(Singapore) T Hee (Indonesia) G E Widjaja	16	19
3	(Malaysia) Chen T J (Malaysia) Toh E W	21	21

==== Section 4 ====
First round
PFQ	(South Korea) Lee J-m (South Korea) Lee Y-l	15	21	21
(Denmark) M Vestergaard (Denmark) C Busch	21	11	14
(Indonesia) A Maulana (Indonesia) I C S Jamil	18	21	22
7	(Malaysia) Goh S H (Malaysia) S J Lai	21	18	20
(Chinese Taipei) Wu G-x (Chinese Taipei) Lee C-h	18	11
(Chinese Taipei) Chen C-k (Chinese Taipei) Hsu Y-h	21	21
(Denmark) R Espersen (Denmark) A C Kudsk	14	9
2	(China) Jiang ZB (China) Wei YX	21	21

Second round
PFQ	(South Korea) Lee J-m (South Korea) Lee Y-l	13	22	19
(Indonesia) A Maulana (Indonesia) I C S Jamil	21	20	21
(Chinese Taipei) Chen C-k (Chinese Taipei) Hsu Y-h	20	11
2	(China) Jiang ZB (China) Wei YX	22	21

Quarter-finals
(Indonesia) A Maulana (Indonesia) I C S Jamil	20	21	19
2	(China) Jiang ZB (China) Wei YX	22	14	21

Preceded by 2026 India Open	BWF World Tour; 2026 BWF season	Succeeded by 2026 Thailand Masters
