= 2025 Indonesia Masters =

Badminton tournament in Indonesia

Tournament details
- Dates: 21–26 January
- Edition: 15th
- Level: Super 500
- Total prize money: US$475,000
- Venue: Istora Senayan
- Location: Jakarta, Indonesia

Champions
- Men's singles: (Thailand) Kunlavut Vitidsarn
- Women's singles: (Thailand) Ratchanok Intanon
- Men's doubles: (Malaysia) Man Wei Chong (Malaysia) Tee Kai Wun
- Women's doubles: (South Korea) Kim Hye-jeong (South Korea) Kong Hee-yong
- Mixed doubles: (Japan) Hiroki Midorikawa (Japan) Natsu Saito

The 2025 Indonesia Masters (officially known as the Daihatsu Indonesia Masters 2025 for sponsorship reasons) was a badminton tournament that took place at the Istora Senayan, Jakarta, Indonesia, from 21 to 26 January 2025 and had a total prize of US$475,000.

== Tournament ==
The 2025 Indonesia Masters was the third tournament of the 2025 BWF World Tour and was part of the Indonesia Masters championships, which has been held since 2010. This tournament was organized by the Badminton Association of Indonesia with sanction from the BWF.

=== Venue ===
This tournament was held at the Istora Senayan in Jakarta, Indonesia.

=== Point distribution ===
Below is the point distribution table for each phase of the tournament based on the BWF points system for the BWF World Tour Super 500 event.

Winner	Runner-up	3/4	5/8	9/16	17/32	33/64	65/128
9,200	7,800	6,420	5,040	3,600	2,220	880	430

=== Prize pool ===
The total prize money was US$475,000 with the distribution of the prize money in accordance with BWF regulations.

Event	Winner	Finalist	Semi-finals	Quarter-finals	Last 16
Singles	$35,625	$18,050	$6,887.50	$2,850	$1,662.50
Doubles	$37,525	$18,050	$6,650	$3,443.75	$1,781.25

== Men's singles ==
=== Seeds ===
1. (China) Shi Yuqi (semi-finals)
2. (Denmark) Anders Antonsen (first round)
3. (Indonesia) Jonatan Christie (final)
4. (Thailand) Kunlavut Vitidsarn (champion)
5. (China) Li Shifeng (quarter-finals)
6. (Japan) Kodai Naraoka (second round)
7. (Chinese Taipei) Chou Tien-chen (first round)
8. (Indonesia) Anthony Sinisuka Ginting (withdrew)

=== Finals ===
Semi-finals
1	(China) Shi Yuqi	13	17
4	(Thailand) Kunlavut Vitidsarn	21	21
3	(Indonesia) Jonatan Christie	21	24
(Chinese Taipei) Wang Tzu-wei	18	22

Final
4	(Thailand) Kunlavut Vitidsarn	18	21	21
3	(Indonesia) Jonatan Christie	21	17	18

=== Top half ===
==== Section 1 ====
First round
1	(China) Shi YQ	21	21
Q4	(India) A Shetty	19	19
Q2	(South Korea) Jeon H-j	21	21
PFQ	(India) K George	12	10
7	(Chinese Taipei) Chou T-c	17	21	15
(Chinese Taipei) Chi Y-j	21	19	21
(Malaysia) Leong J H	14	13
(China) Weng HY	21	21

Second round
1	(China) Shi YQ	21	21
Q2	(South Korea) Jeon H-j	11	14
(Chinese Taipei) Chi Y-j	10	11
(China) Weng HY	21	21

Quarter-finals
1	(China) Shi YQ	22	21
(China) Weng HY	20	9

==== Section 2 ====
First round
4	(Thailand) K Vitidsarn	21	21
Q3	(Republic of Ireland) N Nguyen	9	18
(China) Lu GZ	8	21	21
(Chinese Taipei) Lee C-h	21	13	16
6	(Japan) K Naraoka	21	13	21
(India) P Rajawat	14	21	18
(Singapore) J Teh	20	21	22
(Denmark) R Gemke	22	17	20

Second round
4	(Thailand) K Vitidsarn	18	21	21
(China) Lu GZ	21	8	15
6	(Japan) K Naraoka	19	16
(Singapore) J Teh	21	21

Quarter-finals
4	(Thailand) K Vitidsarn	21	21
(Singapore) J Teh	16	14

=== Bottom half ===
==== Section 3 ====
First round
(Indonesia) C A Dwi Wardoyo	18	14
(Japan) K Nishimoto	21	21
PFQ	(Japan) T Obayashi	9	14
SWM	(India) L Sen	21	21
(Singapore) Loh K Y	21	9	12
(Chinese Taipei) Lin C-y	5	21	21
(Chinese Taipei) Su L-y	13	15
3	(Indonesia) J Christie	21	21

Second round
(Japan) K Nishimoto	21	12	23
SWM	(India) L Sen	16	21	21
(Chinese Taipei) Lin C-y	9	21	15
3	(Indonesia) J Christie	21	10	21

Quarter-finals
(Japan) K Nishimoto	21	13	11
3	(Indonesia) J Christie	17	21	21

==== Section 4 ====
First round
(Canada) B Yang	21	14	26
(Japan) Y Tanaka	15	21	24
Q1	(Hong Kong) J Gunawan	16	12
5	(China) Li SF	21	21
(China) Lei LX	12	12
(Chinese Taipei) Wang T-w	21	21
(Hong Kong) Ng K L	18	21	21
2	(Denmark) A Antonsen	21	18	15

Second round
(Canada) B Yang	19	18
5	(China) Li SF	21	21
(Chinese Taipei) Wang T-w	18	21	21
(Hong Kong) Ng K L	21	16	14

Quarter-finals
5	(China) Li SF	15	18
(Chinese Taipei) Wang T-w	21	21

== Women's singles ==
=== Seeds ===
1. (China) Wang Zhiyi (withdrew)
2. (Indonesia) Gregoria Mariska Tunjung (quarter-finals)
3. (Japan) Tomoka Miyazaki (quarter-finals)
4. (Thailand) Pornpawee Chochuwong (second round)
5. (Singapore) Yeo Jia Min (first round)
6. (Thailand) Ratchanok Intanon (champion)
7. (India) P. V. Sindhu (first round)
8. (Indonesia) Putri Kusuma Wardani (quarter-finals)

=== Finals ===
Semi-finals
6	(Thailand) Ratchanok Intanon	21	21
(Chinese Taipei) Sung Shuo-yun	15	12
(Chinese Taipei) Hsu Wen-chi	11	10
(South Korea) Sim Yu-jin	21	21

Final
6	(Thailand) Ratchanok Intanon	21	21
(South Korea) Sim Yu-jin	18	17

=== Top half ===
==== Section 1 ====
First round
3	(Japan) T Miyazaki	21	21
PFQ	(India) R Ramraj	17	19
(Chinese Taipei) Chiu P-c	21	21
Q1	(Indonesia) C M Handoyo	15	17
6	(Thailand) R Intanon	21	21
Q2	(India) T Hemanth	14	11
(Japan) N Nidaira	21	21
(Canada) M Li	18	19

Second round
3	(Japan) T Miyazaki	21	21
(Chinese Taipei) Chiu P-c	19	14
6	(Thailand) R Intanon	21	24
(Japan) N Nidaira	15	22

Quarter-finals
3	(Japan) T Miyazaki	17	21	15
6	(Thailand) R Intanon	21	11	21

==== Section 2 ====
First round
7	(India) P. V. Sindhu	20	12
(Vietnam) Nguyễn T L	22	21
PFQ	(Ukraine) P Buhrova	23	15	19
Q3	(Malaysia) Letshanaa K	21	21	21
SWM	(China) Gao FJ	11	21	16
(Chinese Taipei) Sung S-y	21	17	21
(Chinese Taipei) Liang T-y	16	14
(Denmark) L Christophersen	21	21

Second round
(Vietnam) Nguyễn T L	21	17	22
Q3	(Malaysia) Letshanaa K	18	21	20
(Chinese Taipei) Sung S-y	21	21
(Denmark) L Christophersen	18	14

Quarter-finals
(Vietnam) Nguyễn T L	16	20
(Chinese Taipei) Sung S-y	21	22

=== Bottom half ===
==== Section 3 ====
First round
(Japan) K Sugiyama	25	21
(Indonesia) K A C Dewi	23	16
(Chinese Taipei) Pai Y-p	13	14
8	(Indonesia) P K Wardani	21	21
(Chinese Taipei) Hsu W-c	21	19	21
(Malaysia) Goh J W	14	21	14
Q4	(Azerbaijan) K F Azzahra	17	12
4	(Thailand) P Chochuwong	21	21

Second round
(Japan) K Sugiyama	16	16
8	(Indonesia) P K Wardani	21	21
(Chinese Taipei) Hsu W-c	21	17	21
4	(Thailand) P Chochuwong	13	21	14

Quarter-finals
8	(Indonesia) P K Wardani	21	17	14
(Chinese Taipei) Hsu W-c	18	21	21

==== Section 4 ====
First round
(Japan) N Okuhara	21	21
(India) A Kashyap	10	13
(South Korea) Sim Y-j	21	7	21
5	(Singapore) Yeo J M	17	21	18
(United States) L Lam	17	21	14
(Chinese Taipei) Lin H-t	21	15	21
(India) A Upadhyaya	12	5
2	(Indonesia) G M Tunjung	21	21

Second round
(Japan) N Okuhara	11	9
(South Korea) Sim Y-j	21	21
(Chinese Taipei) Lin H-t	13	21	14
2	(Indonesia) G M Tunjung	21	15	21

Quarter-finals
(South Korea) Sim Y-j	w	/	o
2	(Indonesia) G M Tunjung

== Men's doubles ==
=== Seeds ===
1. (Indonesia) Fajar Alfian / Muhammad Rian Ardianto (final)
2. (Malaysia) Aaron Chia / Soh Wooi Yik (semi-finals)
3. (Chinese Taipei) Lee Jhe-huei / Yang Po-hsuan (first round)
4. (India) Satwiksairaj Rankireddy / Chirag Shetty (second round)
5. (South Korea) Kang Min-hyuk / Kim Won-ho (quarter-finals)
6. (Indonesia) Sabar Karyaman Gutama / Muhammad Reza Pahlevi Isfahani (first round)
7. (Malaysia) Man Wei Chong / Tee Kai Wun (champions)
8. (China) Huang Di / Liu Yang (first round)

=== Finals ===
Semi-finals
1	(Indonesia) Fajar Alfian (Indonesia) Muhammad Rian Ardianto	21	24
(Thailand) Kittinupong Kedren (Thailand) Dechapol Puavaranukroh	14	22
7	(Malaysia) Man Wei Chong (Malaysia) Tee Kai Wun	21	21
2	(Malaysia) Aaron Chia (Malaysia) Soh Wooi Yik	18	15

Final
1	(Indonesia) Fajar Alfian (Indonesia) Muhammad Rian Ardianto	11	19
7	(Malaysia) Man Wei Chong (Malaysia) Tee Kai Wun	21	21

=== Top half ===
==== Section 1 ====
First round
1	(Indonesia) F Alfian (Indonesia) M R Ardianto	13	21	21
(Denmark) D Lundgaard (Denmark) M Vestergaard	21	19	11
(Malaysia) Low H Y (Malaysia) Ng E C	21	19	21
(Indonesia) R Hidayat (Indonesia) Y Rambitan	14	21	18
6	(Indonesia) S K Gutama (Indonesia) M R P Isfahani	21	15	16
(China) Xie HN (China) Zeng WH	15	21	21
(Malaysia) N M Azriyn A (Malaysia) Tan W K	21	21
(Indonesia) L R Carnando (Indonesia) B Maulana	16	17

Second round
1	(Indonesia) F Alfian (Indonesia) M R Ardianto	16	21	21
(Malaysia) Low H Y (Malaysia) Ng E C	21	7	16
(China) Xie HN (China) Zeng WH	21	21
(Malaysia) N M Azriyn A (Malaysia) Tan W K	16	14

Quarter-finals
1	(Indonesia) F Alfian (Indonesia) M R Ardianto	21	21
(China) Xie HN (China) Zeng WH	16	17

==== Section 2 ====
First round
4	(India) S Rankireddy (India) C Shetty	21	21
(Chinese Taipei) Chen Z-r (Chinese Taipei) Lin Y-c	16	15
Q1	(Indonesia) R Indra (Indonesia) P H Rindorindo	18	9
(Thailand) K Kedren (Thailand) D Puavaranukroh	21	21
8	(China) Huang D (China) Liu Y	17	15
Q3	(Japan) H Midorikawa (Japan) K Yamashita	21	21
Q2	(Malaysia) Lim T J (Malaysia) Wong T C	17	17
(Chinese Taipei) Chiu H-c (Chinese Taipei) Wang C-l	21	21

Second round
4	(India) S Rankireddy (India) C Shetty	20	21
(Thailand) K Kedren (Thailand) D Puavaranukroh	22	23
Q3	(Japan) H Midorikawa (Japan) K Yamashita	21	21
(Chinese Taipei) Chiu H-c (Chinese Taipei) Wang C-l	19	19

Quarter-finals
(Thailand) K Kedren (Thailand) D Puavaranukroh	21	21
Q3	(Japan) H Midorikawa (Japan) K Yamashita	12	19

=== Bottom half ===
==== Section 3 ====
First round
Q4	(Japan) K Shibata (Japan) N Yamada	11	18
(Chinese Taipei) Lee F-c (Chinese Taipei) Lee F-j	21	21
PFQ	(China) Sun WJ (China) Zhu YJ	19	14
7	(Malaysia) Man W C (Malaysia) Tee K W	21	21
(Chinese Taipei) Chiang C-w (Chinese Taipei) Wu H-y	19	20
(Indonesia) M Ahsan (Indonesia) H Setiawan	21	22
(Malaysia) J Arif (Malaysia) Yap R K	21	21
3	(Chinese Taipei) Lee J-h (Chinese Taipei) Yang P-hs	17	19

Second round
(Chinese Taipei) Lee F-c (Chinese Taipei) Lee F-j	21	13
7	(Malaysia) Man W C (Malaysia) Tee K W	23	21
(Indonesia) M Ahsan (Indonesia) H Setiawan	13	14
(Malaysia) J Arif (Malaysia) Yap R K	21	21

Quarter-finals
7	(Malaysia) Man W C (Malaysia) Tee K W	21	21
(Malaysia) J Arif (Malaysia) Yap R K	15	16

==== Section 4 ====
First round
(Indonesia) M S Fikri (Indonesia) D Marthin	21	21
(South Korea) Jin Y (South Korea) Seo S-j	14	19
(Chinese Taipei) Liu K-h (Chinese Taipei) Yang P-ha	18	21	24
5	(South Korea) Kang M-h (South Korea) Kim W-h	21	10	26
(Chinese Taipei) Lu M-c (Chinese Taipei) Tang K-w	23	14	21
(Malaysia) Ong Y S (Malaysia) Teo E Y	21	21	19
(Denmark) W K Boe (Denmark) C F Kjær	13	21
2	(Malaysia) A Chia (Malaysia) Soh W Y	21	23

Second round
(Indonesia) M S Fikri (Indonesia) D Marthin	19	19
5	(South Korea) Kang M-h (South Korea) Kim W-h	21	21
(Chinese Taipei) Lu M-c (Chinese Taipei) Tang K-w	16	16
2	(Malaysia) A Chia (Malaysia) Soh W Y	21	21

Quarter-finals
5	(South Korea) Kang M-h (South Korea) Kim W-h	19	15
2	(Malaysia) A Chia (Malaysia) Soh W Y	21	21

== Women's doubles ==
=== Seeds ===
1. (China) Li Yijing / Luo Xumin (second round)
2. (Malaysia) Pearly Tan / Thinaah Muralitharan (final)
3. (Indonesia) Febriana Dwipuji Kusuma / Amallia Cahaya Pratiwi (quarter-finals)
4. (Hong Kong) Yeung Nga Ting / Yeung Pui Lam (first round)
5. (South Korea) Kim Hye-jeong / Kong Hee-yong (champions)
6. (Japan) Yuki Fukushima / Mayu Matsumoto (quarter-finals)
7. (Thailand) Laksika Kanlaha / Phataimas Muenwong (withdrew)
8. (Chinese Taipei) Sung Shuo-yun / Yu Chien-hui (first round)

=== Finals ===
Semi-finals
PFQ	(China) Jia Yifan (China) Zhang Shuxian	17	20
5	(South Korea) Kim Hye-jeong (South Korea) Kong Hee-yong	21	22
Q1	(South Korea) Lee Yeon-woo (South Korea) Lee Yu-lim	19	16
2	(Malaysia) Pearly Tan (Malaysia) Thinaah Muralitharan	21	21

Final
5	(South Korea) Kim Hye-jeong (South Korea) Kong Hee-yong	21	17	21
2	(Malaysia) Pearly Tan (Malaysia) Thianaah Muralitharan	12	21	18

=== Top half ===
==== Section 1 ====
First round
1	(China) Li YJ (China) Luo XM	21	21
(Hong Kong) Fan K Y (Hong Kong) Yau M Y	12	7
(China) Keng SL (China) Wang ZM	17	12
PFQ	(China) Jia YF (China) Zhang SX	21	21
8	(Chinese Taipei) Sung S-y (Chinese Taipei) Yu C-h	16	20
PFQ	(Malaysia) Go P K (Malaysia) Teoh M X	21	22
(India) T Crasto (India) A Ponnappa	21	21
(Thailand) O Jongsathapornparn (Thailand) S Suwachai	6	14

Second round
1	(China) Li YJ (China) Luo XM	11	19
PFQ	(China) Jia YF (China) Zhang SX	21	21
PFQ	(Malaysia) Go P K (Malaysia) Teoh M X	13	24	21
(India) T Crasto (India) A Ponnappa	21	22	18

Quarter-finals
PFQ	(China) Jia YF (China) Zhang SX	21	21
PFQ	(Malaysia) Go P K (Malaysia) Teoh M X	5	13

==== Section 2 ====
First round
3	(Indonesia) F D Kusuma (Indonesia) A C Pratiwi	21	21
(Hong Kong) Lui L L (Hong Kong) Tsang H Y	12	5
Q4	(Malaysia) Lai P J (Malaysia) Lim C S	21	21	18
(Poland) P Hankiewicz (Poland) K Marczak	23	15	21
5	(South Korea) Kim H-j (South Korea) Kong H-y	22	21
(Indonesia) M T Puspita Sari (Indonesia) R A Rose	20	9
(Denmark) A C Kudsk (Denmark) S Schulz	21	21
(Ukraine) P Buhrova (Ukraine) Y Kantemyr	23	23

Second round
3	(Indonesia) F D Kusuma (Indonesia) A C Pratiwi	21	21
(Poland) P Hankiewicz (Poland) K Marczak	8	8
5	(South Korea) Kim H-j (South Korea) Kong H-y	21	21
(Ukraine) P Buhrova (Ukraine) Y Kantemyr	19	14

Quarter-finals
3	(Indonesia) F D Kusuma (Indonesia) A C Pratiwi	18	21	11
5	(South Korea) Kim H-j (South Korea) Kong H-y	21	13	21

=== Bottom half ===
==== Section 3 ====
First round
Q2	(Thailand) P Phatcharaphisutsin (Thailand) N Sukklad	21	18	14
Q1	(South Korea) Lee Y-w (South Korea) Lee Y-l	9	21	21
(Chinese Taipei) Lin X-m (Chinese Taipei) Wang Y-q	21	16	19
SWM	(Chinese Taipei) Hsieh P-s (Chinese Taipei) Hung E-t	14	21	21
(Indonesia) A N Munggaran (Indonesia) A Z Ramadhani	21	17	19
(Chinese Taipei) Chang C-h (Chinese Taipei) Yang C-t	17	21	21
(Chinese Taipei) Chen S-y (Chinese Taipei) Hsieh Y-e	13	21	21
4	(Hong Kong) Yeung N T (Hong Kong) Yeung P L	21	14	19

Second round
Q1	(South Korea) Lee Y-w (South Korea) Lee Y-l	21	21
SWM	(Chinese Taipei) Hsieh P-s (Chinese Taipei) Hung E-t	10	3
(Chinese Taipei) Chang C-h (Chinese Taipei) Yang C-t	21	21
(Chinese Taipei) Chen S-y (Chinese Taipei) Hsieh Y-e	17	19

Quarter-finals
Q1	(South Korea) Lee Y-w (South Korea) Lee Y-l	18	21	21
(Chinese Taipei) Chang C-h (Chinese Taipei) Yang C-t	21	13	16

==== Section 4 ====
First round
(Chinese Taipei) Hsu Y-h (Chinese Taipei) Lin J-y	17	21	21
(Canada) J Dent (Canada) C Lai	21	16	15
(Indonesia) L T Mayasari (Indonesia) S F S Ramadhanti	19	17
6	(Japan) Y Fukushima (Japan) M Matsumoto	21	21
(Indonesia) S S Azzahra (Indonesia) A S Rahayu	19	21
(Chinese Taipei) Hu L-f (Chinese Taipei) Jheng Y-c	21	23
Q3	(Chinese Taipei) Hsu Y-c (Chinese Taipei) Sung Y-h	16	19
2	(Malaysia) P Tan (Malaysia) Thinaah M	21	21

Second round
(Chinese Taipei) Hsu Y-h (Chinese Taipei) Lin J-y	19	15
6	(Japan) Y Fukushima (Japan) M Matsumoto	21	21
(Chinese Taipei) Hu L-f (Chinese Taipei) Jheng Y-c	19	16
2	(Malaysia) P Tan (Malaysia) Thinaah M	21	21

Quarter-finals
6	(Japan) Y Fukushima (Japan) M Matsumoto	16	15
2	(Malaysia) P Tan (Malaysia) Thinaah M	21	21

== Mixed doubles ==
=== Seeds ===
1. (Malaysia) Chen Tang Jie / Toh Ee Wei (quarter-finals)
2. (Malaysia) Goh Soon Huat / Shevon Jemie Lai (quarter-finals)
3. (Chinese Taipei) Yang Po-hsuan / Hu Ling-fang (first-round)
4. (China) Cheng Xing / Zhang Chi (quarter-finals)
5. (China) Guo Xinwa / Chen Fanghui (final)
6. (Thailand) Dechapol Puavaranukroh / Supissara Paewsampran (semi-finals)
7. (Japan) Hiroki Midorikawa / Natsu Saito (champions)
8. (Malaysia) Tan Kian Meng / Lai Pei Jing (withdrew)

=== Finals ===
Semi-finals
6	(Thailand) Dechapol Puavaranukroh (Thailand) Supissara Paewsampran	20	12
5	(China) Guo Xinwa (China) Chen Fanghui	22	21
(Indonesia) Rinov Rivaldy (Indonesia) Lisa Ayu Kusumawati	18	16
7	(Japan) Hiroki Midorikawa (Japan) Natsu Saito	21	21

Final
5	(China) Guo Xinwa (China) Chen Fanghui	15	17
7	(Japan) Hiroki Midorikawa (Japan) Natsu Saito	21	21

=== Top half ===
==== Section 1 ====
First round
1	(Malaysia) Chen T J (Malaysia) Toh E W	21	21
PFQ	(France) J Maio (France) L Palermo	14	17
(Indonesia) J Hidayatullah (Indonesia) F Pasaribu	21	22
(Chinese Taipei) Lu M-c (Chinese Taipei) Hung E-t	19	20
6	(Thailand) D Puavaranukroh (Thailand) S Paewsampran	21	21
(Indonesia) V Y Mulia (Indonesia) P H Mentari	19	11
(Denmark) M Vestergaard (Denmark) C Busch	17	20
Q4	(Japan) Y Watanabe (Japan) M Taguchi	21	22

Second round
1	(Malaysia) Chen T J (Malaysia) Toh E W	24	21
(Indonesia) J Hidayatullah (Indonesia) F Pasaribu	22	14
6	(Thailand) D Puavaranukroh (Thailand) S Paewsampran	21	21
Q4	(Japan) Y Watanabe (Japan) M Taguchi	17	13

Quarter-finals
1	(Malaysia) Chen T J (Malaysia) Toh E W	21	20	18
6	(Thailand) D Puavaranukroh (Thailand) S Paewsampran	18	22	21

==== Section 2 ====
First round
4	(China) Cheng X (China) Zhang C	21	21
(United States) P Smith (United States) J Gai	15	17
PFQ	(China) Gao JX (China) Wu MY	21	15	21
(Indonesia) A Syahnawi (Indonesia) N V Marwah	19	21	12
5	(China) Guo XW (China) Chen FH	18	21	23
(Hong Kong) Tang C M (Hong Kong) Ng T Y	21	9	21
(Denmark) R Espersen (Denmark) A C Kudsk	20	21	14
(Chinese Taipei) Chen C-k (Chinese Taipei) Hsu Y-h	22	15	21

Second round
4	(China) Cheng X (China) Zhang C	21	18	21
PFQ	(China) Gao JX (China) Wu MY	18	21	7
5	(China) Guo XW (China) Chen FH	21	21
(Chinese Taipei) Chen C-k (Chinese Taipei) Hsu Y-h	10	18

Quarter-finals
4	(China) Cheng X (China) Zhang C	18	21	20
5	(China) Guo XW (China) Chen FH	21	14	22

=== Bottom half ===
==== Section 3 ====
First round
(Indonesia) A Maulana (Indonesia) I C S Jamil	18	14
(India) D Kapila (India) T Crasto	21	21
Q1	(Hong Kong) Lui C W (Hong Kong) Fu C Y	14	17
SWM	(Malaysia) Hoo P R (Malaysia) Cheng S Y	21	21
(England) G Mairs (England) J Mairs	21	21
(India) R Kapoor (India) R Gadde	9	13
(Indonesia) R Rivaldy (Indonesia) L A Kusumawati	21	21	21
3	(Chinese Taipei) Yang P-h (Chinese Taipei) Hu L-f	23	17	17

Second round
(India) D Kapila (India) T Crasto	21	15	19
SWM	(Malaysia) Hoo P R (Malaysia) Cheng S Y	18	21	21
(England) G Mairs (England) J Mairs	18	20
(Indonesia) R Rivaldy (Indonesia) L A Kusumawati	21	22

Quarter-finals
SWM	(Malaysia) Hoo P R (Malaysia) Cheng S Y	23	11	19
(Indonesia) R Rivaldy (Indonesia) L A Kusumawati	21	21	21

==== Section 4 ====
First round
Q2	(Chinese Taipei) Liu K-h (Chinese Taipei) Jheng Y-c	22	21
Q3	(China) Li HY (China) Bao LJ	20	12
(Malaysia) Wong T C (Malaysia) Lim C S	13	15
7	(Japan) H Midorikawa (Japan) N Saito	21	21
(Indonesia) M Faza (Indonesia) A S P Pranata	19	21	21
(Germany) J R Jansen (Germany) T P Nguyen	21	16	13
PFQ	(Indonesia) D Ferdinansyah (Indonesia) S F S Ramadhanti	16	15
2	(Malaysia) Goh S H (Malaysia) S J Lai	21	21

Second round
Q2	(Chinese Taipei) Liu K-h (Chinese Taipei) Jheng Y-c	12	17
7	(Japan) H Midorikawa (Japan) N Saito	21	21
(Indonesia) M Faza (Indonesia) A S P Pranata	16	9
2	(Malaysia) Goh S H (Malaysia) S J Lai	21	21

Quarter-finals
7	(Japan) H Midorikawa (Japan) N Saito	21	21
2	(Malaysia) Goh S H (Malaysia) S J Lai	15	9

Preceded by 2025 India Open	BWF World Tour; 2025 BWF season	Succeeded by 2025 Thailand Masters
