= 2022 BWF World Junior Championships =

Tournament details
- Dates: 24–30 October
- Edition: 22nd
- Level: International
- Venue: Palacio de Deportes de Santander
- Location: Santander, Spain

The 2022 BWF World Junior Championships was the twenty-second edition of the BWF World Junior Championships. It was held in Santander, Spain at the Palacio de Deportes de Santander from 17 to 30 October 2022. Individual players competed to win the Eye Level Cup presented by the former BWF President and chairman of the World Youth Culture Foundation, Kang Young-joong, and the mixed team competed to win Suhandinata Cup.

== Host city selection ==
Spain was awarded the event in November 2018 during the announcement of 18 major badminton event hosts from 2019 to 2025.

== Medalists ==
| Event | Gold | Silver | Bronze |
|---|---|---|---|
| Teams | South Korea; Cho Hyeon-woo; Cho Moon-hee; Cho Song-hyun; Jang Joon-hee; Kim Byung-jae; Kim Tae-rim; Park Beom-soo; Park Sung-ju; Choi Kyung-jin; Jeong Da-yeon; Kim Min-ji; Kim Min-seon; Kim Ye-ri; Ko Hee-joo; Park Na-kyung; Park Seul | Chinese Taipei; Chang Hsuan-yu; Chen You-yu; Huang Jui-hsuan; Huang Tsung-i; Kuo Kuan-lin; Ting Yen-chen; Tsai Cheng-han; Tsai Fu-cheng; Wang Hung-shun; Yang Cheng-hao; Nicole Gonzales Chan; Chen Yu-syuan; Hsieh Yun-shan; Ko Ruo-hsuan; Lin Yu-hao; Lin Yu-pei; Wang Pei-yu; Wang Yi-zhen; Yang Chu-yun; Yang Zih-sian | Indonesia; Muhammad Reza Al Fajri; Putra Erwiansyah; Rayhan Fadillah; Alwi Farhan; Bodhi Ratana Teja Gotama; Raymond Indra; Daniel Edgar Marvino; Zaidan Nabawi; Rafli Ramanda; Prahdiska Bagas Shujiwo; Az-Zahra Putri Dania; Tasya Farahnailah; Anisanaya Kamila; Deswanti Hujansih Nurtertiati; Felisha Pasaribu; Meilysa Trias Puspita Sari; Mutiara Ayu Puspitasari; Az Zahra Ditya Ramadhani; Rachel Allessya Rose; Ester Nurumi Tri Wardoyo |
| Teams | South Korea; Cho Hyeon-woo; Cho Moon-hee; Cho Song-hyun; Jang Joon-hee; Kim Byung-jae; Kim Tae-rim; Park Beom-soo; Park Sung-ju; Choi Kyung-jin; Jeong Da-yeon; Kim Min-ji; Kim Min-seon; Kim Ye-ri; Ko Hee-joo; Park Na-kyung; Park Seul | Chinese Taipei; Chang Hsuan-yu; Chen You-yu; Huang Jui-hsuan; Huang Tsung-i; Kuo Kuan-lin; Ting Yen-chen; Tsai Cheng-han; Tsai Fu-cheng; Wang Hung-shun; Yang Cheng-hao; Nicole Gonzales Chan; Chen Yu-syuan; Hsieh Yun-shan; Ko Ruo-hsuan; Lin Yu-hao; Lin Yu-pei; Wang Pei-yu; Wang Yi-zhen; Yang Chu-yun; Yang Zih-sian | Japan; Seiya Inoue; Koya Iwano; Haruki Kawabe; Sora Ogaki; Yudai Okimoto; Shunya Ota; Shun Saito; Osuke Sakurai; Kaito Sugawara; Daigo Tanioka; Hina Akechi; Mihane Endo; Kokona Ishikawa; Rui Kiyama; Riko Kiyose; Tomoka Miyazaki; Kanano Muroya; Maya Taguchi; Nao Yamakita; Sorano Yoshikawa |
| Boys' singles | (Chinese Taipei) Kuo Kuan-lin | (India) Sankar Subramanian | (South Korea) Kim Byung-jae |
| Boys' singles | (Chinese Taipei) Kuo Kuan-lin | (India) Sankar Subramanian | (Thailand) Panitchaphon Teeraratsakul |
| Girls' singles | (Japan) Tomoka Miyazaki | (China) Yuan Anqi | (Japan) Sorano Yoshikawa |
| Girls' singles | (Japan) Tomoka Miyazaki | (China) Yuan Anqi | (Indonesia) Ester Nurumi Tri Wardoyo |
| Boys' doubles | (China) Xu Huayu (China) Zhu Yijun | (Indonesia) Putra Erwiansyah (Indonesia) Patra Harapan Rindorindo | (South Korea) Cho Song-hyun (South Korea) Park Beom-soo |
| Boys' doubles | (China) Xu Huayu (China) Zhu Yijun | (Indonesia) Putra Erwiansyah (Indonesia) Patra Harapan Rindorindo | (Thailand) Apiluk Gaterahong (Thailand) Witchaya Jintamuttha |
| Girls' doubles | (China) Liu Shengshu (China) Wang Tingge | (Indonesia) Meilysa Trias Puspita Sari (Indonesia) Rachel Allessya Rose | (Japan) Rui Kiyama (Japan) Kanano Muroya |
| Girls' doubles | (China) Liu Shengshu (China) Wang Tingge | (Indonesia) Meilysa Trias Puspita Sari (Indonesia) Rachel Allessya Rose | (Japan) Kokona Ishikawa (Japan) Riko Kiyose |
| Mixed doubles | (China) Zhu Yijun (China) Liu Shengshu | (China) Liao Pinyi (China) Huang Kexin | (China) Shen Xuanyao (China) Li Qian |
| Mixed doubles | (China) Zhu Yijun (China) Liu Shengshu | (China) Liao Pinyi (China) Huang Kexin | (China) Yu Hao (China) Qin Huizhi |

== Medal table ==
| Rank | Nation | Gold | Silver | Bronze | Total |
|---|---|---|---|---|---|
| 1 | China | 3 | 2 | 2 | 7 |
| 2 | Chinese Taipei | 1 | 1 | 0 | 2 |
| 3 | Japan | 1 | 0 | 4 | 5 |
| 4 | South Korea | 1 | 0 | 2 | 3 |
| 5 | Indonesia | 0 | 2 | 2 | 4 |
| 6 | India | 0 | 1 | 0 | 1 |
| 7 | Thailand | 0 | 0 | 2 | 2 |
| Totals (7 entries) | | 6 | 6 | 12 | 24 |
