= 2025 China Masters =

2025 badminton tournament in China

Tournament details
- Dates: 16 – 21 September
- Edition: 18th
- Level: Super 750
- Total prize money: US$1,250,000
- Venue: Shenzhen Arena
- Location: Shenzhen, China

Champions
- Men's singles: (China) Weng Hongyang
- Women's singles: (South Korea) An Se-young
- Men's doubles: (South Korea) Kim Won-ho (South Korea) Seo Seung-jae
- Women's doubles: (China) Jia Yifan (China) Zhang Shuxian
- Mixed doubles: (Thailand) Dechapol Puavaranukroh (Thailand) Supissara Paewsampran

The 2025 China Masters (officially known as the Li-Ning China Masters 2025 for sponsorship reasons) was a badminton tournament that took place at Shenzhen Arena in Shenzhen, China, from 16 to 21 September 2025, and featured a total prize pool of $1,250,000.

== Tournament ==
The 2025 China Masters was the twenty-third tournament of the 2025 BWF World Tour and was also part of the China Masters championships, which have been held since 2005. This tournament was organized by the Chinese Badminton Association and was sanctioned by the BWF.

=== Venue ===
This international tournament was held at Shenzhen Arena in Shenzhen, China.

=== Point distribution ===
Below is the point distribution table for each phase of the tournament based on the BWF points system for the BWF World Tour Super 750 event.

Winner	Runner-up	3/4	5/8	9/16	17/32
11,000	9,350	7,700	6,050	4,320	2,660

=== Prize money ===
The total prize money for this tournament was US$1,250,000. Distribution of prize money was in accordance with BWF regulations.

Event	Winner	Finals	Semi-finals	Quarter-finals	Last 16	Last 32
Singles	$85,100	$40,250	$17,500	$6,875	$3,750	$1,250
Doubles	$92,500	$43,750	$17,500	$7,812.50	$4,062.50	$1,250

== Men's singles ==
=== Seeds ===
1. (China) Shi Yuqi (withdrew)
2. (Denmark) Anders Antonsen (semi-finals)
3. (Thailand) Kunlavut Vitidsarn (quarter-finals)
4. (China) Li Shifeng (quarter-finals)
5. (Indonesia) Jonatan Christie (second round)
6. (Chinese Taipei) Chou Tien-chen (second round)
7. (France) Alex Lanier (quarter-finals)
8. (Singapore) Loh Kean Yew (first round)

=== Finals ===
Semi-finals
(France) Christo Popov	17	18
(China) Weng Hongyang	21	21
(Chinese Taipei) Lin Chun-yi	21	21
2	(Denmark) Anders Antonsen	19	14

Final
(China) Weng Hongyang	21	21
(Chinese Taipei) Lin Chun-yi	11	15

=== Top half ===
==== Section 1 ====
First round
3	(Thailand) K Vitidsarn	21	21
(Singapore) J Teh	15	17
(China) Lu GZ	21	22
(Japan) K Watanabe	19	20
6	(Chinese Taipei) Chou T-c	21	12	21
(India) A Shetty	19	21	16
(France) C Popov	21	21
(Chinese Taipei) Wang T-w	14	17

Second round
3	(Thailand) K Vitidsarn	22	21
(China) Lu GZ	20	17
6	(Chinese Taipei) Chou T-c	11	21	13
(France) C Popov	21	18	21

Quarter-finals
3	(Thailand) K Vitidsarn	11	4^{r}
(France) C Popov	21	11

==== Section 2 ====
First round
8	(Singapore) Loh K Y	20	14
PFR	(Republic of Ireland) N Nguyen	22	21
(Chinese Taipei) Chi Y-j	21	14	21
(Japan) Y Tanaka	12	21	18
SWM	(Japan) K Naraoka	16	9
(China) Weng HY	21	21
(India) L Sen	11	10
(France) T J Popov	21	21

Second round
PFR	(Republic of Ireland) N Nguyen	21	17
(Chinese Taipei) Chi Y-j	23	21
(China) Weng HY	21	21
(France) T J Popov	12	12

Quarter-finals
(Chinese Taipei) Chi Y-j	24	12
(China) Weng HY	26	21

=== Bottom half ===
==== Section 3 ====
First round
(Malaysia) Lee Z J	21	21	6^{r}
(Chinese Taipei) Lin C-y	17	23	14
(Japan) K Nishimoto	19	19
5	(Indonesia) J Christie	21	21
(Indonesia) A S Ginting	19	21	10
(Malaysia) Leong J H	21	5	21
(Indonesia) A Farhan	16	9
4	(China) Li SF	21	21

Second round
(Chinese Taipei) Lin C-y	21	22
5	(Indonesia) J Christie	5	20
(Malaysia) Leong J H	11	21	8
4	(China) Li SF	21	19	21

Quarter-finals
(Chinese Taipei) Lin C-y	21	21
4	(China) Li SF	16	15

==== Section 4 ====
First round
(China) Wang ZX	21	17	11
(Danish Realm) V Axelsen	16	21	21
(Chinese Taipei) Lee C-h	15	21	15
7	(France) A Lanier	21	17	21
(Hong Kong) Ng K L	21
(Hong Kong) Lee C Y	10^{r}
(Denmark) R Gemke	19	19
2	(Denmark) A Antonsen	21	21

Second round
(Denmark) V Axelsen	22	15	13
7	(France) A Lanier	20	21	21
(Hong Kong) Ng K L	21	17	12
2	(Denmark) A Antonsen	19	21	21

Quarter-finals
7	(France) A Lanier	18	14
2	(Denmark) A Antonsen	21	21

== Women's singles ==
=== Seeds ===
1. (South Korea) An Se-young (champion)
2. (China) Wang Zhiyi (quarter-finals)
3. (China) Han Yue (final)
4. (Japan) Akane Yamaguchi (semi-finals)
5. (China) Chen Yufei (quarter-finals)
6. (Thailand) Pornpawee Chochuwong (second round)
7. (Indonesia) Putri Kusuma Wardani (quarter-finals)
8. (Indonesia) Gregoria Mariska Tunjung (withdrew)

=== Finals ===
Semi-finals
1	(South Korea) An Se-young	21	21
4	(Japan) Akane Yamaguchi	10	14
3	(China) Han Yue	18	21	21
(South Korea) Kim Ga-eun	21	17	18

Final
1	(South Korea) An Se-young	21	21
3	(China) Han Yue	11	3

=== Top half ===
==== Section 1 ====
First round
1	(South Korea) An S-y	21	21
(Japan) N Nidaira	13	13
(Denmark) L Kjærsfeldt	9	21	9
(Denmark) M Blichfeldt	21	10	21
6	(Thailand) P Chochuwong	17	21	21
(United States) BW Zhang	21	13	14
(Danish Realm) J D Jakobsen	5	10
(India) P. V. Sindhu	21	21

Second round
1	(South Korea) An S-y	23	21
(Denmark) M Blichfeldt	21	14
6	(Thailand) P Chochuwong	15	15
(India) P. V. Sindhu	21	21

Quarter-finals
1	(South Korea) An S-y	21	21
(India) P. V. Sindhu	14	13

==== Section 2 ====
First round
4	(Japan) A Yamaguchi	21	21
(Thailand) S Katethong	17	15
(Canada) M Li	21	21	21
(Thailand) B Ongbamrungphan	17	23	15
7	(Indonesia) P K Wardani	21	21
(Chinese Taipei) Chiu P-c	15	15
(Japan) M Suizu	21	18	15
(South Korea) Sim Y-j	15	21	21

Second round
4	(Japan) A Yamaguchi	21	21
(Canada) M Li	16	10
7	(Indonesia) P K Wardani	21	21
(South Korea) Sim Y-j	16	19

Quarter-finals
4	(Japan) A Yamaguchi	21	21
7	(Indonesia) P K Wardani	14	11

=== Bottom half ===
==== Section 3 ====
First round
(Denmark) L Christophersen	21	21
(Chinese Taipei) Pai Y-p	18	17
(China) Han QX	13	16
5	(China) Chen YF	21	21
(Vietnam) Nguyễn T L	19	0^{r}
(Singapore) Yeo J M	21	3
(Japan) R Gunji	17	15
3	(China) Han Y	21	21

Second round
(Denmark) L Christophersen	18	10
5	(China) Chen YF	21	21
(Singapore) Yeo J M	21	20	18
3	(China) Han Y	10	22	21

Quarter-finals
5	(China) Chen YF	20	21	19
3	(China) Han Y	22	13	21

==== Section 4 ====
First round
(China) Gao FJ	14	17
(South Korea) Kim G-e	21	21
PFR	(Thailand) P Choeikeewong	11	11
SWM	(Japan) T Miyazaki	21	21
(Thailand) R Intanon	21	21
(Chinese Taipei) Lin H-t	10	10
(Chinese Taipei) Sung S-y	9	15
2	(China) Wang ZY	21	21

Second round
(South Korea) Kim G-e	13	21	21
SWM	(Japan) T Miyazaki	21	12	13
(Thailand) R Intanon	15	21
2	(China) Wang ZY	21	23

Quarter-finals
(South Korea) Kim G-e	13	21	21
2	(China) Wang ZY	21	17	11

== Men's doubles ==
=== Seeds ===
1. (South Korea) Kim Won-ho / Seo Seung-jae (champions)
2. (Malaysia) Aaron Chia / Soh Wooi Yik (semi-finals)
3. (Malaysia) Goh Sze Fei / Nur Izzuddin (quarter-finals)
4. (Denmark) Kim Astrup / Anders Skaarup Rasmussen (second round)
5. (Malaysia) Man Wei Chong / Tee Kai Wun (second round)
6. (China) Liang Weikeng / Wang Chang (second round)
7. (Indonesia) Sabar Karyaman Gutama / Muhammad Reza Pahlevi Isfahani (first round)
8. (India) Satwiksairaj Rankireddy / Chirag Shetty (final)

=== Finals ===
Semi-finals
1	(South Korea) Kim Won-ho (South Korea) Seo Seung-jae	21	21
(Indonesia) Fajar Alfian (Indonesia) Muhammad Shohibul Fikri	13	17
8	(India) Satwiksairaj Rankireddy (India) Chirag Shetty	21	21
2	(Malaysia) Aaron Chia (Malaysia) Soh Wooi Yik	17	14

Final
1	(South Korea) Kim Won-ho (South Korea) Seo Seung-jae	21	21
8	(India) Satwiksairaj Rankireddy (India) Chirag Shetty	19	15

=== Top half ===
==== Section 1 ====
First round
1	(South Korea) Kim W-h (South Korea) Seo S-j	18	21	21
(China) Chen BY (China) Liu Yi	21	19	15
(United States) Chen Z-y (United States) P Smith	21	18	18
(South Korea) Kang M-h (South Korea) Ki D-j	18	21	21
7	(Indonesia) S K Gutama (Indonesia) M R P Isfahani	16	20
(Japan) T Hoki (Japan) Y Kobayashi	21	22
(Chinese Taipei) Lee F-c (Chinese Taipei) Lee F-j	21	18	21
(Malaysia) N M Azriyn A (Malaysia) Tan W K	12	21	12

Second round
1	(South Korea) Kim W-h (South Korea) Seo S-j	17	21	21
(South Korea) Kang M-h (South Korea) Ki D-j	21	15	16
(Japan) T Hoki (Japan) Y Kobayashi	21	21
(Chinese Taipei) Lee F-c (Chinese Taipei) Lee F-j	15	11

Quarter-finals
1	(South Korea) Kim W-h (South Korea) Seo S-j	11	21	21
(Japan) T Hoki (Japan) Y Kobayashi	21	6	17

==== Section 2 ====
First round
3	(Malaysia) Goh S F (Malaysia) N Izzuddin	12	21	22
(Indonesia) M R Ardianto (Indonesia) Y Rambitan	21	11	20
(Chinese Taipei) Lee J-h (Chinese Taipei) Yang P-hs	21	21
(Thailand) K Kedren (Thailand) D Puavaranukroh	8	18
6	(China) Liang WK (China) Wang C	21	21
(Danish Realm) W K Boe (Danish Realm) C F Kjær	14	13
(China) Huang D (China) Liu Ya	10	17
(Indonesia) F Alfian (Indonesia) M S Fikri	21	21

Second round
3	(Malaysia) Goh S F (Malaysia) N Izzuddin	21	22
(Chinese Taipei) Lee J-h (Chinese Taipei) Yang P-hs	16	20
6	(China) Liang WK (China) Wang C	21	15	18
(Indonesia) F Alfian (Indonesia) M S Fikri	16	21	21

Quarter-finals
3	(Malaysia) Goh S F (Malaysia) N Izzuddin	16	11
(Indonesia) F Alfian (Indonesia) M S Fikri	21	21

=== Bottom half ===
==== Section 3 ====
First round
(Chinese Taipei) Chiu H-c (Chinese Taipei) Wang C-l	21	21
(Malaysia) Ong Y S (Malaysia) Teo E Y	10	7
(Malaysia) J Arif (Malaysia) Yap R K	22	13
8	(India) S Rankireddy (India) C Shetty	24	21
(China) Ren XY (China) Xie HN	21	13	21
(Japan) H Midorikawa (Japan) K Yamashita	15	21	19
(Denmark) D Lundgaard (Danish Realm) M Vestergaard	16	13
4	(Denmark) K Astrup (Danish Realm) A S Rasmussen	21	21

Second round
(Chinese Taipei) Chiu H-c (Chinese Taipei) Wang C-l	13	12
8	(India) S Rankireddy (India) C Shetty	21	21
(China) Ren XY (China) Xie HN	15	21	21
4	(Denmark) K Astrup (Danish Realm) A S Rasmussen	21	12	9

Quarter-finals
8	(India) S Rankireddy (India) C Shetty	21	21
(China) Ren XY (China) Xie HN	14	14

==== Section 4 ====
First round
(Japan) K Mitsuhashi (Japan) H Okamura	16	21	16
(Indonesia) L R Carnando (Indonesia) B Maulana	21	16	21
(France) C Popov (France) T J Popov	11	27	15
5	(Malaysia) Man W C (Malaysia) Tee K W	21	25	21
(England) B Lane (England) S Vendy	21	21
(Japan) T Nomura (Japan) Y Shimogami	16	13
(Chinese Taipei) Liu K-h (Chinese Taipei) Yang P-ha	21	21	19
2	(Malaysia) A Chia (Malaysia) Soh W Y	23	19	21

Second round
(Indonesia) L R Carnando (Indonesia) B Maulana	21	21	21
5	(Malaysia) Man W C (Malaysia) Tee K W	10	23	14
(England) B Lane (England) S Vendy	21	15	23
2	(Malaysia) A Chia (Malaysia) Soh W Y	14	21	25

Quarter-finals
(Indonesia) L R Carnando (Indonesia) B Maulana	19	18
2	(Malaysia) A Chia (Malaysia) Soh W Y	21	21

== Women's doubles ==
=== Seeds ===
1. (China) Liu Shengshu / Tan Ning (semi-finals)
2. (Malaysia) Pearly Tan / Thinaah Muralitharan (quarter-finals)
3. (China) Jia Yifan / Zhang Shuxian (champions)
4. (South Korea) Kim Hye-jeong / Kong Hee-yong (final)
5. (Japan) Rin Iwanaga / Kie Nakanishi (quarter-finals)
6. (South Korea) Baek Ha-na / Lee So-hee (semi-finals)
7. (Japan) Yuki Fukushima / Mayu Matsumoto (quarter-finals)
8. (China) Li Yijing / Luo Xumin (second round)

=== Finals ===
Semi-finals
1	(China) Liu Shengshu (China) Tan Ning	18	21	19
4	(South Korea) Kim Hye-jeong (South Korea) Kong Hee-yong	21	18	21
3	(China) Jia Yifan (China) Zhang Shuxian	21	21
6	(South Korea) Baek Ha-na (South Korea) Lee So-hee	7	14

Final
4	(South Korea) Kim Hye-jeong (South Korea) Kong Hee-yong	19	21	13
3	(China) Jia Yifan (China) Zhang Shuxian	21	16	21

=== Top half ===
==== Section 1 ====
First round
1	(China) Liu SS (China) Tan N	21	21
(Indonesia) L T Mayasari (Indonesia) A C Pratiwi	11	16
(Chinese Taipei) Chang C-h (Chinese Taipei) Yang C-t	6	21	15
(South Korea) Jeong N-e (South Korea) Lee Y-w	21	15	21
5	(Japan) R Iwanaga (Japan) K Nakanishi	21	11
(Canada) J Dent (Canada) C Lai	13	4^{r}
(Chinese Taipei) Hsieh P-s (Chinese Taipei) Hung E-t	21	19	15
(Hong Kong) Lui L L (Hong Kong) Tsang H Y	14	21	21

Second round
1	(China) Liu SS (China) Tan N	19	21	21
(South Korea) Jeong N-e (South Korea) Lee Y-w	21	15	12
5	(Japan) R Iwanaga (Japan) K Nakanishi	21	21
(Hong Kong) Lui L L (Hong Kong) Tsang H Y	17	12

Quarter-finals
1	(China) Liu SS (China) Tan N	20	21	21
5	(Japan) R Iwanaga (Japan) K Nakanishi	22	16	10

==== Section 2 ====
First round
4	(South Korea) Kim H-j (South Korea) Kong H-y	21	21
(Japan) H Osawa (Japan) M Taguchi	5	14
(Japan) A Igarashi (Japan) C Shida	21	21
(Chinese Taipei) Teng C-h (Chinese Taipei) Yang C-y	13	7
7	(Japan) Y Fukushima (Japan) M Matsumoto	21	21
(Hong Kong) Fan K Y (Hong Kong) Yau M Y	12	13
(Chinese Taipei) Hsu Y-c (Chinese Taipei) Sung Y-h	21	21
(Japan) K Osawa (Japan) M Tanabe	11	16

Second round
4	(South Korea) Kim H-j (South Korea) Kong H-y	21	21	21
(Japan) A Igarashi (Japan) C Shida	23	19	16
7	(Japan) Y Fukushima (Japan) M Matsumoto	21	21
(Chinese Taipei) Hsu Y-c (Chinese Taipei) Sung Y-h	13	12

Quarter-finals
4	(South Korea) Kim H-j (South Korea) Kong H-y	21	21
7	(Japan) Y Fukushima (Japan) M Matsumoto	19	15

=== Bottom half ===
==== Section 3 ====
First round
(Hong Kong) Yeung N T (Hong Kong) Yeung P L	21	29
(Ukraine) P Buhrova (Ukraine) Y Kantemyr	4	27
(Malaysia) Go P K (Malaysia) Teoh M X	19	21	19
8	(China) Li YJ (China) Luo XM	21	12	21
(Japan) R Hirokami (Japan) S Hobara	21	19	20
(Indonesia) R A Rose (Indonesia) F Setianingrum	7	21	22
(Chinese Taipei) Sung S-y (Chinese Taipei) Yu C-h	10	13
3	(China) Jia YF (China) Zhang SX	21	21

Second round
(Hong Kong) Yeung N T (Hong Kong) Yeung P L	21	18	21
8	(China) Li YJ (China) Luo XM	13	21	10
(Indonesia) R A Rose (Indonesia) F Setianingrum	13	19
3	(China) Jia YF (China) Zhang SX	21	21

Quarter-finals
(Hong Kong) Yeung N T (Hong Kong) Yeung P L	14	12
3	(China) Jia YF (China) Zhang SX	21	21

==== Section 4 ====
First round
(Malaysia) Ong X Y (Malaysia) C Ting	21	21
(India) R Panda (India) S Panda	8	13
(Chinese Taipei) Hu L-f (Chinese Taipei) Jheng Y-c	12	14
6	(South Korea) Baek H-n (South Korea) Lee S-h	21	21
(Chinese Taipei) Hsu Y-h (Chinese Taipei) Lin J-y	10	25	9
(United States) F Corbett (United States) J Gai	21	23	21
(Indonesia) F D Kusuma (Indonesia) M T Puspita Sari	22	16	20
2	(Malaysia) P Tan (Malaysia) Thinaah M	20	21	22

Second round
(Malaysia) Ong X Y (Malaysia) C Ting	13	13
6	(South Korea) Baek H-n (South Korea) Lee S-h	21	21
(United States) F Corbett (United States) J Gai	11	8
2	(Malaysia) P Tan (Malaysia) Thinaah M	21	21

Quarter-finals
6	(South Korea) Baek H-n (South Korea) Lee S-h	23	19	22
2	(Malaysia) P Tan (Malaysia) Thinaah M	21	21	20

== Mixed doubles ==
=== Seeds ===
1. (China) Jiang Zhenbang / Wei Yaxin (semi-finals)
2. (China) Feng Yanzhe / Huang Dongping (semi-finals)
3. (Malaysia) Chen Tang Jie / Toh Ee Wei (final)
4. (Thailand) Dechapol Puavaranukroh / Supissara Paewsampran (champions)
5. (Hong Kong) Tang Chun Man / Tse Ying Suet (quarter-finals)
6. (France) Thom Gicquel / Delphine Delrue (first round)
7. (China) Guo Xinwa / Chen Fanghui (quarter-finals)
8. (Malaysia) Goh Soon Huat / Shevon Jemie Lai (second round)

=== Finals ===
Semi-finals
1	(China) Jiang Zhenbang (China) Wei Yaxin	17	20
4	(Thailand) Dechapol Puavaranukroh (Thailand) Supissara Paewsampran	21	22
3	(Malaysia) Chen Tang Jie (Malaysia) Toh Ee Wei	22	21	21
2	(China) Feng Yanzhe (China) Huang Dongping	24	19	17

Final
4	(Thailand) Dechapol Puavaranukroh (Thailand) Supissara Paewsampran	21	21
3	(Malaysia) Chen Tang Jie (Malaysia) Toh Ee Wei	8	17

=== Top half ===
==== Section 1 ====
First round
1	(China) Jiang ZB (China) Wei YX	21	21
(United States) P Smith (United States) J Gai	14	15
(Chinese Taipei) Lu M-c (Chinese Taipei) Hung E-t	21	12	21
(Chinese Taipei) Yang P-hs (Chinese Taipei) Hu L-f	18	21	18
6	(France) T Gicquel (France) D Delrue	21	16	17
(Thailand) R Oupthong (Thailand) J Sudjaipraparat	12	21	21
(Denmark) M Vestergaard (Denmark) C Busch	21	21
(Canada) K Lee (Canada) E Zhang	16	9

Second round
1	(China) Jiang ZB (China) Wei YX	21	21
(Chinese Taipei) Lu M-c (Chinese Taipei) Hung E-t	10	12
(Thailand) R Oupthong (Thailand) J Sudjaipraparat	21	21
(Denmark) M Vestergaard (Denmark) C Busch	15	17

Quarter-finals
1	(China) Jiang ZB (China) Wei YX	20	21	21
(Thailand) R Oupthong (Thailand) J Sudjaipraparat	22	18	8

==== Section 2 ====
First round
4	(Thailand) D Puavaranukroh (Thailand) S Paewsampran	21	21
(Chinese Taipei) Chen C-k (Chinese Taipei) Hsu Y-h	5	10
(India) R Kapoor (India) R Gadde	17	11
(Japan) Y Shimogami (Japan) S Hobara	21	21
8	(Malaysia) Goh S H (Malaysia) S J Lai	21	21
(Malaysia) Wong T C (Malaysia) Lim C S	17	12
(Chinese Taipei) Ye H-w (Chinese Taipei) N G Chan	15	21	21
(China) Gao JX (China) Wu MY	21	19	16

Second round
4	(Thailand) D Puavaranukroh (Thailand) S Paewsampran	21	21
(Japan) Y Shimogami (Japan) S Hobara	16	5
8	(Malaysia) Goh S H (Malaysia) S J Lai	6	21	12
(Chinese Taipei) Ye H-w (Chinese Taipei) N G Chan	21	16	21

Quarter-finals
4	(Thailand) D Puavaranukroh (Thailand) S Paewsampran	21	21
(Chinese Taipei) Ye H-w (Chinese Taipei) N G Chan	13	12

=== Bottom half ===
==== Section 3 ====
First round
(Denmark) J Toft (Denmark) A Magelund	19	21	21
(China) Cheng X (China) Zhang C	21	15	19
(South Korea) Lee J-m (South Korea) Chae Y-j	21	21	14
5	(Hong Kong) Tang C M (Hong Kong) Tse Y S	23	14	21
(Indonesia) J Hidayatullah (Indonesia) F Pasaribu	23	21
(Japan) H Midorikawa (Japan) N Saito	21	17
(United States) Chen Z-y (United States) F Corbett	12	14
3	(Malaysia) Chen T J (Malaysia) Toh E W	21	21

Second round
(Denmark) J Toft (Denmark) A Magelund	18	19
5	(Hong Kong) Tang C M (Hong Kong) Tse Y S	21	21
(Indonesia) J Hidayatullah (Indonesia) F Pasaribu	13	21	16
3	(Malaysia) Chen T J (Malaysia) Toh E W	21	13	21

Quarter-finals
5	(Hong Kong) Tang C M (Hong Kong) Tse Y S	12	21	17
3	(Malaysia) Chen T J (Malaysia) Toh E W	21	12	21

==== Section 4 ====
First round
(England) C Hemming (England) E van Leeuwen	17	13
(Indonesia) A Syahnawi (Indonesia) N V Marwah	21	21
(Thailand) P Teeraratsakul (Thailand) S Taerattanachai	14	13
6	(China) Guo XW (China) Chen FH	21	21
(Indonesia) A Maulana (Indonesia) I C S Jamil	6	14
(Malaysia) Hoo P R (Malaysia) Cheng S Y	21	21
(India) D Kapila (India) T Crasto	19	13
2	(China) Feng YZ (China) Huang DP	21	21

Second round
(Indonesia) A Syahnawi (Indonesia) N V Marwah	18	7
6	(China) Guo XW (China) Chen FH	21	21
(Malaysia) Hoo P R (Malaysia) Cheng S Y	21	7	10
2	(China) Feng YZ (China) Huang DP	16	21	21

Quarter-finals
6	(China) Guo XW (China) Chen FH	11	12
2	(China) Feng YZ (China) Huang DP	21	21

Preceded by 2025 Hong Kong Open; 2025 Vietnam Open	BWF World Tour; 2025 BWF season	Succeeded by 2025 Korea Open; 2025 Kaohsiung Masters
