= 2024 Macau Open (badminton) =

2024 badminton tournament

Tournament details
- Dates: 24–29 September
- Level: Super 300
- Total prize money: US$210,000
- Venue: Macau East Asian Games Dome
- Location: Macau, China

Champions
- Men's singles: (Hong Kong) Ng Ka Long
- Women's singles: (China) Gao Fangjie
- Men's doubles: (China) Chen Xujun (China) Liu Yi
- Women's doubles: (China) Li Wenmei (China) Zhang Shuxian
- Mixed doubles: (China) Guo Xinwa (China) Chen Fanghui

The 2024 Macau Open (officially known as the Sands China Ltd. Macau Open Badminton 2024 for sponsorship reasons) was a badminton tournament which took place at Macao East Asian Games Dome in Macau from 24 September to 29 September 2024 and had a total prize of $210,000.

== Tournament ==
The 2024 Macau Open was the twenty-eighth tournament of the 2024 BWF World Tour and also part of the Macau Open championships, which had been held since 2006. This tournament was organized by Badminton Federation of Macau and sanctioned by the BWF.

=== Venue ===
This international tournament was held at Macao East Asian Games Dome in Macau.

=== Point distribution ===
Below is the point distribution table for each phase of the tournament based on the BWF points system for the BWF World Tour Super 300 event.

Winner	Runner-up	3/4	5/8	9/16	17/32	33/64	65/128
7,000	5,950	4,900	3,850	2,750	1,670	660	320

=== Prize money ===
The total prize money for this tournament was US$210,000. Distribution of prize money was in accordance with BWF regulations.

Event	Winner	Finals	Semi-finals	Quarter-finals	Last 16
Singles	$15,750	$7,980	$3,045	$1,260	$735
Doubles	$16,590	$7,980	$2,940	$1,522.50	$787.50

== Men's singles ==
=== Seeds ===
1. (Hong Kong) Lee Cheuk Yiu (quarter-finals)
2. (Hong Kong) Ng Ka Long (champion)
3. (Chinese Taipei) Chi Yu-jen (first round)
4. (Chinese Taipei) Su Li-yang (second round)
5. (Thailand) Kantaphon Wangcharoen (first round)
6. (India) Srikanth Kidambi (quarter-finals)
7. (Singapore) Jason Teh (final)
8. (Indonesia) Alwi Farhan (semi-finals)

=== Finals ===
Semi-finals
7	(Singapore) Jason Teh	24	21
(Hong Kong) Jason Gunawan	22	18
8	(Indonesia) Alwi Farhan	21	18	16
2	(Hong Kong) Ng Ka Long	8	21	21

Final
7	(Singapore) Jason Teh	19	17
2	(Hong Kong) Ng Ka Long	21	21

=== Top half ===
==== Section 1 ====
First round
1	(Hong Kong) Lee C Y	21	21
(Kazakhstan) D Panarin	14	19
(India) M Manjunath	12	15
(Chinese Taipei) Huang Y-k	21	21
7	(Singapore) J Teh	21	21
(Malaysia) Soong J V	17	13
(India) S Verma	21	11	13
(China) Wang ZX	18	21	21

Second round
1	(Hong Kong) Lee C Y	14	21	21
(Chinese Taipei) Huang Y-k	21	9	14
7	(Singapore) J Teh	21	21
(China) Wang ZX	14	12

Quarter-finals
1	(Hong Kong) Lee C Y	18	16
7	(Singapore) J Teh	21	21

==== Section 2 ====
First round
3	(Chinese Taipei) Chi Y-j	24	18	17
Q4	(China) Liu L	22	21	21
(Italy) G Toti	21	10	14
Q3	(Japan) R Hatano	16	21	21
5	(Thailand) K Wangcharoen	10	18
(Indonesia) Y S Marcellyno	21	21
WC	(Macau) Pui P F	7	15
(Hong Kong) J Gunawan	21	21

Second round
Q4	(China) Liu L	16	21
Q3	(Japan) R Hatano	21	23
(Indonesia) Y S Marcellyno	18	17
(Hong Kong) J Gunawan	21	21

Quarter-finals
Q3	(Japan) R Hatano	16	21	15
(Hong Kong) J Gunawan	21	15	21

=== Bottom half ===
==== Section 3 ====
First round
(Chinese Taipei) Wang P-w	6	9
(Malaysia) J Hoh	21	21
(Malaysia) Cheam J W	17	20
8	(Indonesia) A Farhan	21	22
(Japan) K Takahashi	21	17	21
Q1	(Malaysia) Kok J H	11	21	13
(Chinese Taipei) Liao J-f	11	5
4	(Chinese Taipei) Su L-y	21	21

Second round
(Malaysia) J Hoh	21	16	17
8	(Indonesia) A Farhan	15	21	21
(Japan) K Takahashi	21	18	21
4	(Chinese Taipei) Su L-y	13	21	19

Quarter-finals
8	(Indonesia) A Farhan	14	21	21
(Japan) K Takahashi	21	10	18

==== Section 4 ====
First round
Q2	(India) A Mishra	13	5
(India) A Shetty	21	21
(Israel) D Dubovenko	14	15
6	(India) S Kidambi	21	21
(Thailand) Pan Teeraratsakul	21	10	21
(India) S Subramanian	14	21	12
(India) C Sen	12	17
2	(Hong Kong) Ng K L	21	21

Second round
(India) A Shetty	13	18
6	(India) S Kidambi	21	21
(Thailand) Pan Teeraratsakul	21	8	9
2	(Hong Kong) Ng K L	14	21	21

Quarter-finals
6	(India) S Kidambi	16	12
2	(Hong Kong) Ng K L	21	21

== Women's singles ==
=== Seeds ===
1. (Thailand) Busanan Ongbamrungphan (quarter-finals)
2. (Thailand) Pornpawee Chochuwong (second round)
3. (Thailand) Ratchanok Intanon (first round)
4. (Japan) Tomoka Miyazaki (semi-finals)
5. (Indonesia) Putri Kusuma Wardani (quarter-finals)
6. (China) Gao Fangjie (champion)
7. (Chinese Taipei) Chiu Pin-chian (semi-finals)
8. (Indonesia) Komang Ayu Cahya Dewi (first round)

=== Finals ===
Semi-finals
6	(China) Gao Fangjie	21	14	21
7	(Chinese Taipei) Chiu Pin-chian	13	21	13
4	(Japan) Tomoka Miyazaki	21	16	16
(Chinese Taipei) Lin Hsiang-ti	17	21	21

Final
6	(China) Gao Fangjie	21	21	21
(Chinese Taipei) Lin Hsiang-ti	23	9	11

=== Top half ===
==== Section 1 ====
First round
1	(Thailand) B Ongbamrungphan	21	21
(Malaysia) Letshanaa K	13	12
Q2	(China) Dai W	21	21
PFQ	(Japan) A Kurihara	6	9
6	(China) Gao FJ	21	21
(Japan) H Akechi	18	19
Q4	(Chinese Taipei) Tung C-t	13	13
(Thailand) L Chaiwan	21	21

Second round
1	(Thailand) B Ongbamrungphan	21	22
Q2	(China) Dai W	17	20
6	(China) Gao FJ	21	21
(Thailand) L Chaiwan	15	12

Quarter-finals
1	(Thailand) B Ongbamrungphan	22	11	16
6	(China) Gao FJ	20	21	21

==== Section 2 ====
First round
3	(Thailand) R Intanon	18	21	0^{r}
(Hong Kong) Lo S Y	21	19	0
(Japan) R Gunji	21	20	21
(India) A Upadhyaya	12	22	7
7	(Chinese Taipei) Chiu P-c	21	21
(Ukraine) P Buhrova	10	15
(India) T Hemanth	18	19
(Chinese Taipei) Liang T-y	21	21

Second round
(Hong Kong) Lo S Y	12	8
(Japan) R Gunji	21	21
7	(Chinese Taipei) Chiu P-c	24	21
(Chinese Taipei) Liang T-y	22	12

Quarter-finals
(Japan) R Gunji	18	12
7	(Chinese Taipei) Chiu P-c	21	21

=== Bottom half ===
==== Section 3 ====
First round
(Japan) M Suizu	21	11	21
(Myanmar) Thet Htar T	10	21	8
PFQ	(Chinese Taipei) Huang C-p	17	12
5	(Indonesia) P K Wardani	21	21
(India) T Mir	15	21	22
(India) D Sihag	21	18	20
(Malaysia) Wong L C	21	15	16
4	(Japan) T Miyazaki	16	21	21

Second round
(Japan) M Suizu	16	17
5	(Indonesia) P K Wardani	21	21
(India) T Mir	17	21	10
4	(Japan) T Miyazaki	21	13	21

Quarter-finals
5	(Indonesia) P K Wardani	7	21	17
4	(Japan) T Miyazaki	21	17	21

==== Section 4 ====
First round
Q1	(Chinese Taipei) Hung Y-t	21	21
(Chinese Taipei) Huang Y-h	15	19
(Chinese Taipei) Lin H-t	21	21
8	(Indonesia) K A C Dewi	18	14
(India) I Baruah	7	15
Q3	(China) Wu LY	21	21
WC	(Macau) Pui C W	11	9
2	(Thailand) P Chochuwong	21	21

Second round
Q1	(Chinese Taipei) Hung Y-t	14	10
(Chinese Taipei) Lin H-t	21	21
Q3	(China) Wu LY	21	24
2	(Thailand) P Chochuwong	16	22

Quarter-finals
(Chinese Taipei) Lin H-t	23	21
Q3	(China) Wu LY	21	12

== Men's doubles ==
=== Seeds ===
1. (England) Ben Lane / Sean Vendy (first round)
2. (Indonesia) Sabar Karyaman Gutama / Muhammad Reza Pahlevi Isfahani (final)
3. (Thailand) Peeratchai Sukphun / Pakkapon Teeraratsakul (quarter-finals)
4. (Chinese Taipei) Lee Fang-chih / Lee Fang-jen (semi-finals)
5. (Chinese Taipei) Liu Kuang-heng / Yang Po-han (quarter-finals)
6. (Chinese Taipei) Chang Ko-chi / Chen Xin-yuan (second round)
7. (Chinese Taipei) Lin Bing-wei / Su Ching-heng (first round)
8. (Indonesia) Muhammad Shohibul Fikri / Daniel Marthin (second round)

=== Finals ===
Semi-finals
(China) Chen Xujun (China) Liu Yi	22	21	23
4	(Chinese Taipei) Lee Fang-chih (Chinese Taipei) Lee Fang-jen	24	13	21
(Malaysia) Nur Mohd Azriyn Ayub (Malaysia) Tan Wee Kiong	12	19
2	(Indonesia) Sabar Karyaman Gutama (Indonesia) Muhammad Reza Pahlevi Isfahani	21	21

Final
(China) Chen Xujun (China) Liu Yi	21	21
2	(Indonesia) Sabar Karyaman Gutama (Indonesia) Muhammad Reza Pahlevi Isfahani	18	14

=== Top half ===
==== Section 1 ====
First round
1	(England) B Lane (England) S Vendy	23	21	20
(China) Chen XJ (China) Liu Y	25	13	22
(Chinese Taipei) Chen C-k (Chinese Taipei) Chen S-f	21	21
(Malaysia) Low H Y (Malaysia) Ng E C	16	12
5	(Chinese Taipei) Liu K-h (Chinese Taipei) Yang P-h	21	9	21
(Hong Kong) Law C H (Hong Kong) Lee C H	14	21	19
PFQ	(Hong Kong) Hung K C (Hong Kong) Lui C W	17	21	21
(Thailand) P Thongkham (Thailand) W Thongkham	21	16	15

Second round
(China) Chen XJ (China) Liu Y	21	21
(Chinese Taipei) Chen C-k (Chinese Taipei) Chen S-f	12	13
5	(Chinese Taipei) Liu K-h (Chinese Taipei) Yang P-h	21	15	21
PFQ	(Hong Kong) Hung K C (Hong Kong) Lui C W	11	21	18

Quarter-finals
(China) Chen XJ (China) Liu Y	11	21	22
5	(Chinese Taipei) Liu K-h (Chinese Taipei) Yang P-h	21	14	20

==== Section 2 ====
First round
4	(Chinese Taipei) Lee F-c (Chinese Taipei) Lee F-j	21	21
(Chinese Taipei) Chiu H-c (Chinese Taipei) Wang C-l	19	19
WC	(Macau) Leong I C (Macau) Vong K W	11	10
(Chinese Taipei) Chen Z-r (Chinese Taipei) Lin Y-c	21	21
7	(Chinese Taipei) Lin B-w (Chinese Taipei) Su C-h	15	19
(Malaysia) B Goonting (Malaysia) Fazriq R	21	21
(Malaysia) Chia W J (Malaysia) Lwi S H	16	14
Q4	(Malaysia) Goh B Z (Malaysia) Wong V S	21	21

Second round
4	(Chinese Taipei) Lee F-c (Chinese Taipei) Lee F-j	21	17	21
(Chinese Taipei) Chen Z-r (Chinese Taipei) Lin Y-c	12	21	16
(Malaysia) B Goonting (Malaysia) Fazriq R	21	21
Q4	(Malaysia) Goh B Z (Malaysia) Wong V S	17	17

Quarter-finals
4	(Chinese Taipei) Lee F-c (Chinese Taipei) Lee F-j	21	21
(Malaysia) B Goonting (Malaysia) Fazriq R	7	11

=== Bottom half ===
==== Section 3 ====
First round
(China) Chen BY (China) Guo RH	17	16
(Malaysia) N M Azriyn A (Malaysia) Tan W K	21	21
(Indonesia) R Hidayat (Indonesia) Y Rambitan	21	17	19
8	(Indonesia) M S Fikri (Indonesia) D Marthin	17	21	21
Q3	(Malaysia) Lim T J (Malaysia) Wong T C	18	17
Q2	(China) Sun WJ (China) Zhu YJ	21	21
(Malaysia) Lau Y S (Malaysia) Lee Y B	17	11
3	(Thailand) P Sukphun (Thailand) Pak Teeraratsakul	21	21

Second round
(Malaysia) N M Azriyn A (Malaysia) Tan W K	21	14	21
8	(Indonesia) M S Fikri (Indonesia) D Marthin	18	21	11
Q2	(China) Sun WJ (China) Zhu YJ	18	19
3	(Thailand) P Sukphun (Thailand) Pak Teeraratsakul	21	21

Quarter-finals
(Malaysia) N M Azriyn A (Malaysia) Tan W K	19	21	21
3	(Thailand) P Sukphun (Thailand) Pak Teeraratsakul	21	19	18

==== Section 4 ====
First round
Q1	(Chinese Taipei) He Z-w (Chinese Taipei) Huang J-h	20	21	17
(Chinese Taipei) Lu M-c (Chinese Taipei) Tang K-w	22	15	21
(Malaysia) Boon X Y (Malaysia) Goh V S	18	21	13
6	(Chinese Taipei) Chang K-c (Chinese Taipei) Chen X-y	21	18	21
(China) Cui HC (China) Peng JQ	21	21
(South Korea) Choi S-g (South Korea) Heo K-h	16	17
(Japan) T Aizawa (Japan) D Sano	12	15
2	(Indonesia) S K Gutama (Indonesia) M R P Isfahani	21	21

Second round
(Chinese Taipei) Lu M-c (Chinese Taipei) Tang K-w	21	21
6	(Chinese Taipei) Chang K-c (Chinese Taipei) Chen X-y	19	15
(China) Cui HC (China) Peng JQ	14	15
2	(Indonesia) S K Gutama (Indonesia) M R P Isfahani	21	21

Quarter-finals
(Chinese Taipei) Lu M-c (Chinese Taipei) Tang K-w	11	18
2	(Indonesia) S K Gutama (Indonesia) M R P Isfahani	21	21

== Women's doubles ==
=== Seeds ===
1. (Hong Kong) Yeung Nga Ting / Yeung Pui Lam (first round)
2. (Thailand) Laksika Kanlaha / Phataimas Muenwong (withdrew)
3. (India) Treesa Jolly / Gayatri Gopichand (semi-finals)
4. (Chinese Taipei) Chang Ching-hui / Yang Ching-tun (first round)
5. (Indonesia) Jesita Putri Miantoro / Febi Setianingrum (second round)
6. (Chinese Taipei) Hsu Yin-hui / Lin Jhih-yun (quarter-finals)
7. (Ukraine) Polina Buhrova / Yevheniia Kantemyr (first round)
8. (Chinese Taipei) Hsieh Pei-shan / Hung En-tzu (final)

=== Finals ===
Semi-finals
8	(Chinese Taipei) Hsieh Pei-shan (Chinese Taipei) Hung En-tzu	21	16	21
3	(India) Treesa Jolly (India) Gayatri Gopichand	17	21	10
(China) Li Wenmei (China) Zhang Shuxian	21	21
(Chinese Taipei) Nicole Gonzales Chan (Chinese Taipei) Yang Chu-yun	12	6

Final
8	(Chinese Taipei) Hsieh Pei-shan (Chinese Taipei) Hung En-tzu	23	21	20
(China) Li Wenmei (China) Zhang Shuxian	25	18	22

=== Top half ===
==== Section 1 ====
First round
1	(Hong Kong) Yeung N T (Hong Kong) Yeung P L	19	23
(Chinese Taipei) Lin X-m (Chinese Taipei) Wang Y-q	21	25
(Japan) M Kanehiro (Japan) Y Kato	21	22
(Hong Kong) Lui L L (Hong Kong) Tsang H Y	18	20
8	(Chinese Taipei) Hsieh P-s (Chinese Taipei) Hung E-t	21	21
(Japan) Y Fukushima (Japan) A Miyazaki	15	17
(Indonesia) A N T Munggaran (Indonesia) A Z D Ramadhani	21	16	21
(Chinese Taipei) Hsu Y-c (Chinese Taipei) Sung Y-h	17	21	15

Second round
(Chinese Taipei) Lin X-m (Chinese Taipei) Wang Y-q	21	21
(Japan) M Kanehiro (Japan) Y Kato	14	17
8	(Chinese Taipei) Hsieh P-s (Chinese Taipei) Hung E-t	19	24	21
(Indonesia) A N T Munggaran (Indonesia) A Z D Ramadhani	21	22	15

Quarter-finals
(Chinese Taipei) Lin X-m (Chinese Taipei) Wang Y-q	17	19
8	(Chinese Taipei) Hsieh P-s (Chinese Taipei) Hung E-t	21	21

==== Section 2 ====
First round
3	(India) T Jolly (India) G Gopichand	15	21	21
(Japan) A Sato (Japan) M Taguchi	21	16	14
(Chinese Taipei) Lin C-c (Chinese Taipei) Teng C-h	21	21
(Chinese Taipei) Chiu P-c (Chinese Taipei) Tung C-t	11	10
6	(Chinese Taipei) Hsu Y-h (Chinese Taipei) Lin J-y	19	21	21
(Hong Kong) Fan K Y (Hong Kong) Yau M Y	21	13	17
Q3	(China) Ding KY (China) Luo Y	21	21
(India) A Gahlawat (India) S Gahlawat	3	10

Second round
3	(India) T Jolly (India) G Gopichand	22	21
(Chinese Taipei) Lin C-c (Chinese Taipei) Teng C-h	20	11
6	(Chinese Taipei) Hsu Y-h (Chinese Taipei) Lin J-y	21	22
Q3	(China) Ding KY (China) Luo Y	16	20

Quarter-finals
3	(India) T Jolly (India) G Gopichand	21	21
6	(Chinese Taipei) Hsu Y-h (Chinese Taipei) Lin J-y	12	17

=== Bottom half ===
==== Section 3 ====
First round
Q4	(Chinese Taipei) Tsai R-l (Chinese Taipei) Wang Y-z	12	14
(China) Keng SL (China) Wang TG	21	21
WC	(Macau) Ng W C (Macau) Pui C W	13	9
SWM	(Chinese Taipei) Lee C-c (Chinese Taipei) Lin Y-y	21	21
PFQ	(Hong Kong) Leung Y Y (Hong Kong) Ng W Y	11	13
(China) Li WM (China) Zhang SX	21	21
Q2	(Chinese Taipei) Hu L-f (Chinese Taipei) Jheng Y-c	21	21
7	(Ukraine) P Buhrova (Ukraine) Y Kantemyr	17	10

Second round
(China) Keng SL (China) Wang TG	18	18
SWM	(Chinese Taipei) Lee C-c (Chinese Taipei) Lin Y-y	21	21
(China) Li WM (China) Zhang SX	21	21
Q2	(Chinese Taipei) Hu L-f (Chinese Taipei) Jheng Y-c	17	17

Quarter-finals
SWM	(Chinese Taipei) Lee C-c (Chinese Taipei) Lin Y-y	10	9
(China) Li WM (China) Zhang SX	21	21

==== Section 4 ====
First round
Q1	(India) Gadde R S (India) N S Reddy	17	19
(Chinese Taipei) N G Chan (Chinese Taipei) Yang C-y	21	21
(Chinese Taipei) Hsieh M-y (Chinese Taipei) Huang T-l	17	11
5	(Indonesia) J P Miantoro (Indonesia) F Setianingrum	21	21
(Japan) M Kawazoe (Japan) H Konishi	16	21	22
(China) Chen FH (China) Zhang C	21	11	20
(Japan) R Hirokami (Japan) R Kiyama	21	18	21
4	(Chinese Taipei) Chang C-h (Chinese Taipei) Yang C-t	17	21	15

Second round
(Chinese Taipei) N G Chan (Chinese Taipei) Yang C-y	21	18	21
5	(Indonesia) J P Miantoro (Indonesia) F Setianingrum	12	21	17
(Japan) M Kawazoe (Japan) H Konishi	21	24
(Japan) R Hirokami (Japan) R Kiyama	15	22

Quarter-finals
(Chinese Taipei) N G Chan (Chinese Taipei) Yang C-y	21	7	21
(Japan) M Kawazoe (Japan) H Konishi	17	21	13

== Mixed doubles ==
=== Seeds ===
1. (Hong Kong) Tang Chun Man / Tse Ying Suet (quarter-finals)
2. (Singapore) Terry Hee / Jessica Tan (first round)
3. (Indonesia) Dejan Ferdinansyah / Gloria Emanuelle Widjaja (final)
4. (Hong Kong) Lee Chun Hei / Ng Tsz Yau (withdrew)
5. (China) Guo Xinwa / Chen Fanghui (champions)
6. (China) Cheng Xing / Zhang Chi (quarter-finals)
7. (Thailand) Pakkapon Teeraratsakul / Phataimas Muenwong (withdrew)
8. (Thailand) Ruttanapak Oupthong / Jhenicha Sudjaipraparat (quarter-finals)

=== Finals ===
Semi-finals
SWM	(Malaysia) Hoo Pang Ron (Malaysia) Cheng Su Yin	15	21	14
3	(Indonesia) Dejan Ferdinansyah (Indonesia) Gloria Emanuelle Widjaja	21	17	21
5	(China) Guo Xinwa (China) Chen Fanghui	21	21
(Chinese Taipei) Ye Hong-wei (Chinese Taipei) Nicole Gonzales Chan	12	11

Final
3	(Indonesia) Dejan Ferdinansyah (Indonesia) Gloria Emanuelle Widjaja	15	18
5	(China) Guo Xinwa (China) Chen Fanghui	21	21

=== Top half ===
==== Section 1 ====
First round
1	(Hong Kong) Tang C M (Hong Kong) Tse Y S	21	21
(Chinese Taipei) Chen S-f (Chinese Taipei) Tsai R-l	10	8
(Chinese Taipei) Chang K-c (Chinese Taipei) Lin Y-y	21	18	20
(Hong Kong) Hung K C (Hong Kong) Tsang H Y	15	21	22
SWM	(Malaysia) Hoo P R (Malaysia) Cheng S Y	21	21
(Chinese Taipei) Lu M-c (Chinese Taipei) Hung E-t	15	13
(Hong Kong) Lui C W (Hong Kong) Fu C Y	21	21
Q3	(Chinese Taipei) Lin S-k (Chinese Taipei) Hsieh P-s	19	18

Second round
1	(Hong Kong) Tang C M (Hong Kong) Tse Y S	21	21
(Hong Kong) Hung K C (Hong Kong) Tsang H Y	11	12
SWM	(Malaysia) Hoo P R (Malaysia) Cheng S Y	21	21
(Hong Kong) Lui C W (Hong Kong) Fu C Y	18	10

Quarter-finals
1	(Hong Kong) Tang C M (Hong Kong) Tse Y S	18	18
SWM	(Malaysia) Hoo P R (Malaysia) Cheng S Y	21	21

==== Section 2 ====
First round
3	(Indonesia) D Ferdinansyah (Indonesia) G E Widjaja	21	21
PFQ	(Chinese Taipei) Chen X-y (Chinese Taipei) Wang Y-z	12	13
(Chinese Taipei) Po L-w (Chinese Taipei) Chang C-h	22	21
(Chinese Taipei) Lin B-w (Chinese Taipei) Lin C-c	20	13
8	(Thailand) R Oupthong (Thailand) J Sudjaipraparat	23	24
(India) R Kapoor (India) Gadde R S	21	22
WC	(Macau) Leong I C (Macau) Ng W C	12	18
Q2	(Chinese Taipei) Liu K-h (Chinese Taipei) Jheng Y-c	21	21

Second round
3	(Indonesia) D Ferdinansyah (Indonesia) G E Widjaja	21	21
(Chinese Taipei) Po L-w (Chinese Taipei) Chang C-h	8	12
8	(Thailand) R Oupthong (Thailand) J Sudjaipraparat	23	21	21
Q2	(Chinese Taipei) Liu K-h (Chinese Taipei) Jheng Y-c	25	16	17

Quarter-finals
3	(Indonesia) D Ferdinansyah (Indonesia) G E Widjaja	21	21
8	(Thailand) R Oupthong (Thailand) J Sudjaipraparat	18	10

=== Bottom half ===
==== Section 3 ====
First round
(Malaysia) Wong T C (Malaysia) Lim C S	21	22
(Chinese Taipei) Wu H-y (Chinese Taipei) Yang C-y	18	20
Q1	(Malaysia) Loo B K (Malaysia) Ho L E	22	21	13
SWM	(India) B S Reddy (India) N S Reddy	24	10	21
(China) Zhou ZH (China) Yang JY	23	21
(Japan) D Sano (Japan) A Sato	21	13
PFQ	(Hong Kong) Yeung S C (Hong Kong) Lui L L	19	21	12
5	(China) Guo XW (China) Chen FH	21	19	21

Second round
(Malaysia) Wong T C (Malaysia) Lim C S	21	21
SWM	(India) B S Reddy (India) N S Reddy	17	14
(China) Zhou ZH (China) Yang JY	15	16
5	(China) Guo XW (China) Chen FH	21	21

Quarter-finals
(Malaysia) Wong T C (Malaysia) Lim C S	16	20
5	(China) Guo XW (China) Chen FH	21	22

==== Section 4 ====
First round
Q4	(Chinese Taipei) Wang C-l (Chinese Taipei) Lin J-y	25	21	7
(Chinese Taipei) Chen C-k (Chinese Taipei) Hsu Y-h	27	19	21
(Chinese Taipei) Chen Z-r (Chinese Taipei) Yang C-t	14	17
6	(China) Cheng X (China) Zhang C	21	21
(Ukraine) O Titov (Ukraine) Y Kantemyr	7	9
(Chinese Taipei) Chiu H-c (Chinese Taipei) Lee C-c	21	21
(Chinese Taipei) Ye H-w (Chinese Taipei) N G Chan	21	11
2	(Singapore) T Hee (Singapore) J Tan	15	4^{r}

Second round
(Chinese Taipei) Chen C-k (Chinese Taipei) Hsu Y-h	13	15
6	(China) Cheng X (China) Zhang C	21	21
(Chinese Taipei) Chiu H-c (Chinese Taipei) Lee C-c	20	13
(Chinese Taipei) Ye H-w (Chinese Taipei) N G Chan	22	21

Quarter-finals
6	(China) Cheng X (China) Zhang C	21	18
(Chinese Taipei) Ye H-w (Chinese Taipei) N G Chan	23	21

Preceded by 2024 China Open	BWF World Tour; 2024 BWF season	Succeeded by 2024 Arctic Open
