= Chen Xujun =

Chinese badminton player (born 2001)

Chen Xujun 陈旭君
Personal information
- Born: 4 March 2001 (age 25) Zhejiang, China
- Height: 1.78 m (5 ft 10 in)

Sport
- Country: China
- Sport: Badminton
- Handedness: Right

Men's doubles
- Highest ranking: 85 (with Guo Ruohan, 22 July 2025); 135 (with Liu Yi, 8 October 2024)
- Current ranking: 85 (with Guo Ruohan, 22 July 2025)
- BWF profile
Medal record
Men's badminton
Representing China
Asia Mixed Team Championships
Silver medal – second place	2025 Qingdao	Mixed team
World Junior Championships
Silver medal – second place	2019 Kazan	Mixed team
Asian Junior Championships
Bronze medal – third place	2019 Suzhou	Mixed doubles

Chen Xujun (simplified Chinese: 陈旭君; traditional Chinese: 陳旭君; pinyin: Chén Xùjūn; born 4 March 2001) is a Chinese badminton player. He is affiliated with the Zhejiang team.

== Career ==
In 2019, Chen clinched bronze in the mixed doubles event at the 2019 Asian Junior Championships with Zhang Chi. A few months later, he won a silver medal as a part of China's mixed team at the 2019 World Junior Championships.

In 2023, he won the China International men's doubles title with partner Peng Jianqin, beating Low Hang Yee and Ng Eng Cheong in three games.

In 2024, competing in their second tournament together, Chen and Liu Yi defeated Indonesians Sabar Karyaman Gutama and Muhammad Reza Pahlevi Isfahani to win the Macau Open.

== Achievements ==
=== Asian Junior Championships ===
Mixed doubles
Year	Venue	Partner	Opponent	Score	Result
2019	Suzhou Olympic Sports Centre; Suzhou, China	(China) Zhang Chi	(China) Feng Yanzhe (China) Lin Fangling	8–21, 13–21	Bronze

=== BWF World Tour (1 title, 1 runner-up) ===
The BWF World Tour, which was announced on 19 March 2017 and implemented in 2018, is a series of elite badminton tournaments sanctioned by the Badminton World Federation (BWF). The BWF World Tours are divided into levels of World Tour Finals, Super 1000, Super 750, Super 500, Super 300, and the BWF Tour Super 100.

Men's doubles
Year	Tournament	Level	Partner	Opponent	Score	Result
2024	Macau Open	Super 300	(China) Liu Yi	(Indonesia) Sabar Karyaman Gutama (Indonesia) Muhammad Reza Pahlevi Isfahani	21–18, 21–14	(gold) Winner
2025	Vietnam Open	Super 100	(China) Guo Ruohan	(South Korea) Jin Yong (South Korea) Na Sung-seung	10–21, 14–21	(silver) Runner-up

=== BWF International Challenge/Series (2 titles) ===
Men's doubles
Year	Tournament	Partner	Opponent	Score	Result
2023	China International	(China) Peng Jianqin	(Malaysia) Low Hang Yee (Malaysia) Ng Eng Cheong	21–19, 19–21, 21–14	(gold) Winner
2025	Thailand International	(China) Guo Ruohan	(Thailand) Pharanyu Kaosamaang (Thailand) Tanadon Punpanich	19–21, 21–15, 21–18	(gold) Winner

BWF International Challenge tournament
BWF International Series tournament
BWF Future Series tournament
