= 2024 Arctic Open =

Badminton tournament in Finland

Tournament details
- Dates: 8–13 October
- Edition: 24th
- Level: Super 500
- Total prize money: US$420,000
- Venue: Energia Areena
- Location: Vantaa, Finland

Champions
- Men's singles: (Chinese Taipei) Chou Tien-chen
- Women's singles: (China) Han Yue
- Men's doubles: (Malaysia) Goh Sze Fei (Malaysia) Nur Izzuddin
- Women's doubles: (China) Liu Shengshu (China) Tan Ning
- Mixed doubles: (China) Feng Yanzhe (China) Huang Dongping
- Official website: www.arcticopen.fi

The 2024 Arctic Open (officially known as the Clash Royale Arctic Open 2024 powered by Yonex for sponsorship reasons) was a badminton tournament which took place at Energia Areena in Vantaa, Finland, from 8 to 13 October 2024 and had a total purse of $420,000.

== Tournament ==
The 2024 Arctic Open was the twenty-ninth tournament of the 2024 BWF World Tour and also part of the Arctic Open championships (previously known as Finnish Open), which had been held since 1990. This tournament was organized by Badminton Finland and sanctioned by the BWF.

=== Venue ===
This tournament was held at Energia Areena in Vantaa, Finland.

=== Point distribution ===
Below is the point distribution table for each phase of the tournament based on the BWF points system for the BWF World Tour Super 500 event.

Winner	Runner-up	3/4	5/8	9/16	17/32	33/64	65/128
9,200	7,800	6,420	5,040	3,600	2,220	880	430

=== Prize pool ===
The total prize money was US$420,000 with the distribution of the prize money in accordance with BWF regulations.

Event	Winner	Finalist	Semi-finals	Quarter-finals	Last 16
Singles	$31,500	$15,960	$6,090	$2,520	$1,470
Doubles	$33,180	$15,960	$5,880	$3,045	$1,575

== Men's singles ==
=== Seeds ===
1. (Denmark) Anders Antonsen (first round)
2. (Japan) Kodai Naraoka (quarter-finals)
3. (Malaysia) Lee Zii Jia (quarter-finals)
4. (China) Li Shifeng (second round)
5. (Indonesia) Jonatan Christie (final)
6. (Thailand) Kunlavut Vitidsarn (semi-finals)
7. (Chinese Taipei) Chou Tien-chen (champion)
8. (Indonesia) Anthony Sinisuka Ginting (first round)

=== Finals ===
Semi-finals
7	(Chinese Taipei) Chou Tien-chen	21	14	21
(Japan) Koki Watanabe	12	21	10
5	(Indonesia) Jonatan Christie	w	/	o
6	(Thailand) Kunlavut Vitidsarn

Final
7	(Chinese Taipei) Chou Tien-chen	21	21
5	(Indonesia) Jonatan Christie	18	17

=== Top half ===
==== Section 1 ====
First round
1	(Denmark) A Antonsen	21	18	18
(France) A Lanier	18	21	21
(Japan) T Obayashi	21	10	12
Q4	(Republic of Ireland) N Nguyen	14	21	21
7	(Chinese Taipei) Chou T-c	21	21
Q2	(France) A Merklé	16	17
(Denmark) R Gemke
(India) L Sen	w	/	o

Second round
(France) A Lanier	24	21
Q4	(Republic of Ireland) N Nguyen	22	9
7	(Chinese Taipei) Chou T-c	19	21	21
(India) L Sen	21	18	15

Quarter-finals
(France) A Lanier	20	21	19
7	(Chinese Taipei) Chou T-c	22	13	21

==== Section 2 ====
First round
3	(Malaysia) Lee Z J	21	21
(France) C Popov	15	11
(China) Lei LX	18	29	16
(Japan) Y Tanaka	21	27	21
8	(Indonesia) A S Ginting	21	23	16
(China) Lu GZ	19	25	21
Q3	(Belgium) J Carraggi	21	15	8
(Japan) K Watanabe	19	21	21

Second round
3	(Malaysia) Lee Z J	21	21
(Japan) Y Tanaka	11	18
(China) Lu GZ	11	13
(Japan) K Watanabe	21	21

Quarter-finals
3	(Malaysia) Lee Z J	15	21	12
(Japan) K Watanabe	21	13	21

=== Bottom half ===
==== Section 3 ====
First round
Q1	(India) K George	23	21
(Chinese Taipei) Wang T-w	21	18
(Chinese Taipei) Lee C-h	19	18
5	(Indonesia) J Christie	21	21
(Malaysia) Leong J H	19	9
(Hong Kong) Lee C Y	21	21
(France) T J Popov	20	15
4	(China) Li SF	22	21

Second round
Q1	(India) K George	17	8
5	(Indonesia) J Christie	21	21
(Hong Kong) Lee C Y	21	21
4	(China) Li SF	15	18

Quarter-finals
5	(Indonesia) J Christie	21	21
(Hong Kong) Lee C Y	5	12

==== Section 4 ====
First round
WC	(Finland) J Oldorff	14	19
(Hong Kong) Ng K L	21	21
(China) Weng HY	11	14
6	(Thailand) K Vitidsarn	21	21
(Chinese Taipei) Su L-y	21	15	21
(Japan) K Nishimoto	13	21	17
(Canada) B Yang	17	9
2	(Japan) K Naraoka	21	21

Second round
(Hong Kong) Ng K L	15	21	10
6	(Thailand) K Vitidsarn	21	12	21
(Chinese Taipei) Su L-y	18	19
2	(Japan) K Naraoka	21	21

Quarter-finals
6	(Thailand) K Vitidsarn	21	21
2	(Japan) K Naraoka	16	12

== Women's singles ==
=== Seeds ===
1. (China) Wang Zhiyi (first round)
2. (China) Han Yue (champion)
3. (Indonesia) Gregoria Mariska Tunjung (semi-finals)
4. (Japan) Aya Ohori (second round)
5. (Thailand) Supanida Katethong (quarter-finals)
6. (India) P. V. Sindhu (first round)
7. (Thailand) Pornpawee Chochuwong (second round)
8. (Japan) Nozomi Okuhara (withdrew)

=== Finals ===
Semi-finals
(Thailand) Ratchanok Intanon	21	21
SWM	(Japan) Tomoka Miyazaki	11	14
3	(Indonesia) Gregoria Mariska Tunjung	9	21	9
2	(China) Han Yue	21	16	21

Final
(Thailand) Ratchanok Intanon	10	13
2	(China) Han Yue	21	21

=== Top half ===
==== Section 1 ====
First round
1	(China) Wang ZY	21	15	17
(Thailand) R Intanon	18	21	21
(India) M Bansod	21	24
(Chinese Taipei) Sung S-y	19	22
5	(Thailand) S Katethong	21	21
Q1	(Finland) P Saarnivaara	8	4
(Denmark) M Blichfeldt	21	15	19
(Indonesia) P K Wardani	17	21	21

Second round
(Thailand) R Intanon	21	21
(India) M Bansod	15	8
5	(Thailand) S Katethong	21	21
(Indonesia) P K Wardani	17	19

Quarter-finals
(Thailand) R Intanon	24	10	23
5	(Thailand) S Katethong	22	21	21

==== Section 2 ====
First round
4	(Japan) A Ohori	21	21
Q3	(Hungary) Á Kőrösi	11	10
(Japan) N Nidaira	21	21
(Denmark) L Christophersen	9	11
SWM	(Japan) T Miyazaki	21	21
Q4	(Israel) H Neiman	16	16
(Scotland) K Gilmour	21	21
WC	(Finland) N Nyqvist	11	18

Second round
4	(Japan) A Ohori	11	13
(Japan) N Nidaira	21	21
SWM	(Japan) T Miyazaki	21	21
(Scotland) K Gilmour	16	16

Quarter-finals
(Japan) N Nidaira	16	16
SWM	(Japan) T Miyazaki	21	21

=== Bottom half ===
==== Section 3 ====
First round
PFQ	(India) U Hooda	21	23	21
PFQ	(Brazil) J V Vieira	16	25	17
(Canada) M Li	21	21
6	(India) P. V. Sindhu	16	10
(China) Zhang YM	21	17	22
(Denmark) J D Jakobsen	17	21	20
(Denmark) L Kjærsfeldt	16	11
3	(Indonesia) G M Tunjung	21	21

Second round
PFQ	(India) U Hooda	10	19
(Canada) M Li	21	21
(China) Zhang YM	14	12
3	(Indonesia) G M Tunjung	21	21

Quarter-finals
(Canada) M Li	15	18
3	(Indonesia) G M Tunjung	21	21

==== Section 4 ====
First round
(Singapore) Yeo J M	21	21
Q2	(Czech Republic) T Švábíková	9	15
(Thailand) P Choeikeewong	19	16
7	(Thailand) P Chochuwong	21	21
(India) A Kashyap	21	21
(Germany) Y Li	19	14
(Chinese Taipei) Pai Y-p	0^{r}
2	(China) Han Y	6

Second round
(Singapore) Yeo J M	21	23
7	(Thailand) P Chochuwong	15	21
(India) A Kashyap	9	8
2	(China) Han Y	21	21

Quarter-finals
(Singapore) Yeo J M	21	14	9
2	(China) Han Y	17	21	21

== Men's doubles ==
=== Seeds ===
1. (China) Liang Weikeng / Wang Chang (semi-finals)
2. (Denmark) Kim Astrup / Anders Skaarup Rasmussen (final)
3. (Malaysia) Aaron Chia / Soh Wooi Yik (second round)
4. (Indonesia) Fajar Alfian / Muhammad Rian Ardianto (quarter-finals)
5. (Malaysia) Goh Sze Fei / Nur Izzuddin (champions)
6. (Japan) Takuro Hoki / Yugo Kobayashi (second round)
7. (Chinese Taipei) Lee Jhe-huei / Yang Po-hsuan (quarter-finals)
8. (Malaysia) Man Wei Chong / Tee Kai Wun (quarter-finals)

=== Finals ===
Semi-finals
1	(China) Liang Weikeng (China) Wang Chang	21	17	18
5	(Malaysia) Goh Sze Fei (Malaysia) Nur Izzuddin	19	21	21
Q1	(Thailand) Kittinupong Kedren (Thailand) Dechapol Puavaranukroh	14	19
2	(Denmark) Kim Astrup (Denmark) Anders Skaarup Rasmussen	21	21

Final
5	(Malaysia) Goh Sze Fei (Malaysia) Nur Izzuddin	15	21	21
2	(Denmark) Kim Astrup (Denmark) Anders Skaarup Rasmussen	21	15	19

=== Top half ===
==== Section 1 ====
First round
1	(China) Liang WK (China) Wang C	23	21
(Chinese Taipei) Liu K-h (Chinese Taipei) Yang P-ha	21	19
(Chinese Taipei) Lin B-w (Chinese Taipei) Su C-h	21	21
(Malaysia) J Arif (Malaysia) Yap R K	17	19
8	(Malaysia) Man W C (Malaysia) Tee K W	17	21	21
Q3	(Indonesia) L R Carnando (Indonesia) B Maulana	21	18	12
Q4	(Scotland) A Dunn (Scotland) A Pringle	13	21	21
(Germany) D Hess (Germany) M Seidel	21	14	19

Second round
1	(China) Liang WK (China) Wang C	21	21
(Chinese Taipei) Lin B-w (Chinese Taipei) Su C-h	10	12
8	(Malaysia) Man W C (Malaysia) Tee K W	21	21
Q4	(Scotland) A Dunn (Scotland) A Pringle	10	15

Quarter-finals
1	(China) Liang WK (China) Wang C	21	16	21
8	(Malaysia) Man W C (Malaysia) Tee K W	17	21	17

==== Section 2 ====
First round
4	(Indonesia) F Alfian (Indonesia) M R Ardianto	21	22
(Chinese Taipei) Lee F-c (Chinese Taipei) Lee F-j	13	20
(Denmark) R Espersen (Denmark) C F Kjær	21	24
(Germany) B Geiss (Germany) J C Völker	12	22
5	(Malaysia) Goh S F (Malaysia) N Izzuddin	11	23	21
(Denmark) R Kjær (Denmark) F Søgaard	21	21	15
(Scotland) C Grimley (Scotland) M Grimley	15	21	16
(Japan) K Mitsuhashi (Japan) H Okamura	21	19	21

Second round
4	(Indonesia) F Alfian (Indonesia) M R Ardianto	21	21
(Denmark) R Espersen (Denmark) C F Kjær	13	8
5	(Malaysia) Goh S F (Malaysia) N Izzuddin	21	21
(Japan) K Mitsuhashi (Japan) H Okamura	16	16

Quarter-finals
4	(Indonesia) F Alfian (Indonesia) M R Ardianto	21	21	20
5	(Malaysia) Goh S F (Malaysia) N Izzuddin	23	19	22

=== Bottom half ===
==== Section 3 ====
First round
Q1	(Thailand) K Kedren (Thailand) D Puavaranukroh	21	22
(France) C Popov (France) T J Popov	13	20
(England) C Hemming (England) E van Leeuwen	10	22	12
6	(Japan) T Hoki (Japan) Y Kobayashi	21	20	21
Q2	(Czech Republic) J Král (Czech Republic) O Král	15	12
(England) B Lane (England) S Vendy	21	21
(China) Chen BY (China) Liu Y	18	18
3	(Malaysia) A Chia (Malaysia) Soh W Y	21	21

Second round
Q1	(Thailand) K Kedren (Thailand) D Puavaranukroh	15	21	21
6	(Japan) T Hoki (Japan) Y Kobayashi	21	17	12
(England) B Lane (England) S Vendy	21	21
3	(Malaysia) A Chia (Malaysia) Soh W Y	13	8

Quarter-finals
Q1	(Thailand) K Kedren (Thailand) D Puavaranukroh	21	10	21
(England) B Lane (England) S Vendy	10	21	10

==== Section 4 ====
First round
(Malaysia) Ong Y S (Malaysia) Teo E Y	14	16
(Denmark) D Lundgaard (Denmark) M Vestergaard	21	21
(Chinese Taipei) Lu M-c (Chinese Taipei) Tang K-w	14	20
7	(Chinese Taipei) Lee J-h (Chinese Taipei) Yang P-hs	21	22
(China) Xie HN (China) Zeng WH	17	13
(Indonesia) M Ahsan (Indonesia) H Setiawan	21	21
(Denmark) A Søndergaard (Denmark) J Toft	21	12	18
2	(Denmark) K Astrup (Denmark) A S Rasmussen	18	21	21

Second round
(Denmark) D Lundgaard (Denmark) M Vestergaard	16	13
7	(Chinese Taipei) Lee J-h (Chinese Taipei) Yang P-hs	21	21
(Indonesia) M Ahsan (Indonesia) H Setiawan	13	21	9
2	(Denmark) K Astrup (Denmark) A S Rasmussen	21	13	21

Quarter-finals
7	(Chinese Taipei) Lee J-h (Chinese Taipei) Yang P-hs	12	21	19
2	(Denmark) K Astrup (Denmark) A S Rasmussen	21	13	21

== Women's doubles ==
=== Seeds ===
1. (China) Liu Shengshu / Tan Ning (champions)
2. (Japan) Rin Iwanaga / Kie Nakanishi (semi-finals)
3. (Malaysia) Pearly Tan / Thinaah Muralitharan (final)
4. (China) Li Yijing / Luo Xumin (semi-finals)
5. (Thailand) Benyapa Aimsaard / Nuntakarn Aimsaard (quarter-finals)
6. (Chinese Taipei) Chang Ching-hui / Yang Ching-tun (quarter-finals)
7. (Chinese Taipei) Sung Shuo-yun / Yu Chien-hui (quarter-finals)
8. (Japan) Kokona Ishikawa / Mio Konegawa (second round)

=== Finals ===
Semi-finals
1	(China) Liu Shengshu (China) Tan Ning	20	21	21
4	(China) Li Yijing (China) Luo Xumin	22	18	12
3	(Malaysia) Pearly Tan (Malaysia) Thinaah Muralitharan	21	19	26
2	(Japan) Rin Iwanaga (Japan) Kie Nakanishi	19	21	24

Final
1	(China) Liu Shengshu (China) Tan Ning	21	21
3	(Malaysia) Pearly Tan (Malaysia) Thinaah Muralitharan	12	17

=== Top half ===
==== Section 1 ====
First round
(Denmark) N P Anthonisen (Denmark) S Thygesen
(India) R Panda (India) S Panda	w	/	o
(Austria) S Diapka (Austria) L Rumpold	10	13
(Sweden) M Sjöö (Sweden) T Sjöö	21	21

Second round
1	(China) Liu SS (China) Tan N	21	21
(India) R Panda (India) S Panda	8	10
7	(Chinese Taipei) Sung S-y (Chinese Taipei) Yu C-h	21	21
(Sweden) M Sjöö (Sweden) T Sjöö	7	10

Quarter-finals
1	(China) Liu SS (China) Tan N	21	21
7	(Chinese Taipei) Sung S-y (Chinese Taipei) Yu C-h	9	11

==== Section 2 ====
First round
(Poland) P Hankiewicz (Poland) K Marczak	21	21
(Austria) S Au Yeong (Austria) A Hagspiel	12	17
(Thailand) O Jongsathapornparn (Thailand) S Suwachai	21	21
(Finland) S Asfar (Finland) O Tapola	3	1

Second round
4	(China) Li YJ (China) Luo XM	21	21
(Poland) P Hankiewicz (Poland) K Marczak	6	5
5	(Thailand) B Aimsaard (Thailand) N Aimsaard	21	21
(Thailand) O Jongsathapornparn (Thailand) S Suwachai	10	17

Quarter-finals
4	(China) Li YJ (China) Luo XM	21	21
5	(Thailand) B Aimsaard (Thailand) N Aimsaard	10	12

=== Bottom half ===
==== Section 3 ====
First round
(Denmark) A C Kudsk (Denmark) S Schulz	21	21
(Republic of Ireland) O Flynn (Republic of Ireland) M Ryan	10	9
(Netherlands) K de Wit (Ukraine) M Stoliarenko	21	21
(Finland) R Tuominen (Finland) E Virta	9	7

Second round
(Denmark) A C Kudsk (Denmark) S Schulz	13	9
6	(Chinese Taipei) Chang C-h (Chinese Taipei) Yang C-t	21	21
(Netherlands) K de Wit (Ukraine) M Stoliarenko	10	11
3	(Malaysia) P Tan (Malaysia) Thinaah M	21	21

Quarter-finals
6	(Chinese Taipei) Chang C-h (Chinese Taipei) Yang C-t	8	18
3	(Malaysia) P Tan (Malaysia) Thinaah M	21	21

==== Section 4 ====
First round
(China) Jia YF (China) Li WM	21	21
(Latvia) A Kupča (Latvia) J Romanova	9	3
(England) C Birch (England) E van Leeuwen	14	21	16
(Scotland) J MacPherson (Scotland) C Torrance	21	13	21

Second round
(China) Jia YF (China) Li WM	18	21	21
8	(Japan) K Ishikawa (Japan) M Konegawa	21	11	12
(Scotland) J MacPherson (Scotland) C Torrance	12	7
2	(Japan) R Iwanaga (Japan) K Nakanishi	21	21

Quarter-finals
(China) Jia YF (China) Li WM	21	22	17
2	(Japan) R Iwanaga (Japan) K Nakanishi	10	24	21

== Mixed doubles ==
=== Seeds ===
1. (China) Feng Yanzhe / Huang Dongping (champions)
2. (China) Jiang Zhenbang / Wei Yaxin (final)
3. (Malaysia) Goh Soon Huat / Shevon Jemie Lai (semi-finals)
4. (China) Cheng Xing / Zhang Chi (semi-finals)
5. (Denmark) Jesper Toft / Amalie Magelund (first round)
6. (Chinese Taipei) Yang Po-hsuan / Hu Ling-fang (second round)
7. (Malaysia) Tan Kian Meng / Lai Pei Jing (first round)
8. (Indonesia) Rinov Rivaldy / Pitha Haningtyas Mentari (quarter-finals)

=== Finals ===
Semi-finals
1	(China) Feng Yanzhe (China) Huang Dongping	21	21
4	(China) Cheng Xing (China) Zhang Chi	16	18
3	(Malaysia) Goh Soon Huat (Malaysia) Shevon Jemie Lai	14	8
2	(China) Jiang Zhenbang (China) Wei Yaxin	21	21

Final
1	(China) Feng Yanzhe (China) Huang Dongping	21	6	21
2	(China) Jiang Zhenbang (China) Wei Yaxin	18	21	15

=== Top half ===
==== Section 1 ====
First round
1	(China) Feng YZ (China) Huang DP	21	21
(Slovenia) M Ivančič (Slovenia) P Polanc	8	8
(France) T Gicquel (France) D Delrue	22	21
(Denmark) M Vestergaard (Denmark) C Busch	20	19
5	(Denmark) J Toft (Denmark) A Magelund	13	21	14
(Indonesia) R N Kusharjanto (Indonesia) L A Kusumawati	21	17	21
(Denmark) R Espersen (Denmark) A C Kudsk	21	21
(Poland) R Cybulski (Poland) K Marczak	16	19

Second round
1	(China) Feng YZ (China) Huang DP	21	21	21
(France) T Gicquel (France) D Delrue	23	15	13
(Indonesia) R N Kusharjanto (Indonesia) L A Kusumawati	21	21
(Denmark) R Espersen (Denmark) A C Kudsk	18	15

Quarter-finals
1	(China) Feng YZ (China) Huang DP	21	21
(Indonesia) R N Kusharjanto (Indonesia) L A Kusumawati	13	8

==== Section 2 ====
First round
4	(China) Cheng X (China) Zhang C	20	21	21
(Scotland) A Dunn (Scotland) J MacPherson	22	15	9
Q4	(Estonia) M Õunmaa (Estonia) R Üprus	14	9
(India) S K Karunakaran (India) A Variyath	21	21
7	(Malaysia) Tan K M (Malaysia) Lai P J	16	21	10
(Thailand) S Jomkoh (Thailand) S Taerattanachai	21	18	21
Q1	(Republic of Ireland) J Magee (Republic of Ireland) M Ryan	10	14
(Thailand) R Oupthong (Thailand) J Sudjaipraparat	21	21

Second round
4	(China) Cheng X (China) Zhang C	21	21
(India) S K Karunakaran (India) A Variyath	12	15
(Thailand) S Jomkoh (Thailand) S Taerattanachai	21	30
(Thailand) R Oupthong (Thailand) J Sudjaipraparat	18	28

Quarter-finals
4	(China) Cheng X (China) Zhang C	21	14	21
(Thailand) S Jomkoh (Thailand) S Taerattanachai	11	21	12

=== Bottom half ===
==== Section 3 ====
First round
(Malaysia) Hoo P R (Malaysia) Cheng S Y	21	21
(China) Guo XW (China) Chen FH	16	10
(United States) L Wang (United States) E Wang	8	8
6	(Chinese Taipei) Yang P-h (Chinese Taipei) Hu L-f	21	21
(Thailand) D Puavaranukroh (Thailand) S Paewsampran	21	21
Q2	(Hungary) B Pápai (Hungary) L Pápai	4	3
Q3	(Czech Republic) O Král (Czech Republic) T Švábíková	14	16
3	(Malaysia) Goh S H (Malaysia) S J Lai	21	21

Second round
(Malaysia) Hoo P R (Malaysia) Cheng S Y	21	21
6	(Chinese Taipei) Yang P-h (Chinese Taipei) Hu L-f	19	12
(Thailand) D Puavaranukroh (Thailand) S Paewsampran	20	16
3	(Malaysia) Goh S H (Malaysia) S J Lai	22	21

Quarter-finals
(Malaysia) Hoo P R (Malaysia) Cheng S Y	19	15
3	(Malaysia) Goh S H (Malaysia) S J Lai	21	21

==== Section 4 ====
First round
(England) G Mairs (England) J Mairs	21	21
(England) C Hemming (England) Es van Leeuwen	15	9
(Scotland) A Pringle (Scotland) R Andrew	7	7
8	(Indonesia) R Rivaldy (Indonesia) P H Mentari	21	21
(Malaysia) Yap R K (Malaysia) V Siow	12^{r}
(England) Et van Leeuwen (England) C Birch	16
(Netherlands) R Tabeling (Denmark) A Bøje	17	16
2	(China) Jiang ZB (China) Wei YX	21	21

Second round
(England) G Mairs (England) J Mairs	21	10	16
8	(Indonesia) R Rivaldy (Indonesia) P H Mentari	19	21	21
(England) Et van Leeuwen (England) C Birch	7	14
2	(China) Jiang ZB (China) Wei YX	21	21

Quarter-finals
8	(Indonesia) R Rivaldy (Indonesia) P H Mentari	9	14
2	(China) Jiang ZB (China) Wei YX	21	21

Preceded by 2024 Macau Open	BWF World Tour; 2024 BWF season	Succeeded by 2024 Denmark Open; 2024 Malaysia Super 100
