= 2026 BWF World Championships – Mixed doubles =

Badminton championships

Mixed doubles at the 2026 BWF World Championships
- Venue: Indira Gandhi Arena
- Location: New Delhi, India
- Dates: 17–23 August
- Competitors: 48 from 28 nations

Medalists
gold medal	Thom Gicquel; Delphine Delrue	France
silver medal	Feng Yanzhe; Huang Dongping	China
bronze medal	Amri Syahnawi; Nita Violina Marwah	Indonesia
bronze medal	Jiang Zhenbang; Wei Yaxin	China

The Mixed doubles tournament of the 2026 BWF World Championships took place from 17 to 23 August 2026 at the Indira Gandhi Arena in New Delhi.

== Seeds ==
The seeding list was based on the World Rankings of 31 July 2026.

1. (China) Feng Yanzhe / Huang Dongping (final)
2. (China) Jiang Zhenbang / Wei Yaxin (semi-finals)
3. (Denmark) Mathias Christiansen / Alexandra Bøje (third round)
4. (Thailand) Dechapol Puavaranukroh / Supissara Paewsampran (quarter-finals)
5. (France) Thom Gicquel / Delphine Delrue (champions)
6. (China) Guo Xinwa / Chen Fanghui (quarter-finals)
7. (Hong Kong) Tang Chun Man / Tse Ying Suet (withdrew)
8. (China) Cheng Xing / Zhang Chi (quarter-finals)
9. (Chinese Taipei) Ye Hong-wei / Nicole Gonzales Chan (third round)
10. (Malaysia) Goh Soon Huat / Shevon Jemie Lai (third round)
11. (Chinese Taipei) Yang Po-hsuan / Hu Ling-fang (quarter-finals)
12. (Thailand) Pakkapon Teeraratsakul / Sapsiree Taerattanachai (third round)
13. (Japan) Yuichi Shimogami / Sayaka Hobara (third round)
14. (United States) Presley Smith / Jennie Gai (third round)
15. (India) Dhruv Kapila / Tanisha Crasto (third round)
16. (Japan) Yuta Watanabe / Maya Taguchi (third round)

== Draw ==
The drawing ceremony was held on 5 August.

=== Finals ===
Semi-finals
1	(China) Feng Yanzhe (China) Huang Dongping	20	21	22
SWM	(Indonesia) Amri Syahnawi (Indonesia) Nita Violina Marwah	22	14	20
5	(France) Thom Gicquel (France) Delphine Delrue	19	21	21
2	(China) Jiang Zhenbang (China) Wei Yaxin	21	13	11

Final
1	(China) Feng Yanzhe (China) Huang Dongping	20	21	15
5	(France) Thom Gicquel (France) Delphine Delrue	22	19	21

=== Top half ===
==== Section 1 ====
First round
(Canada) J Lai (Canada) C Lai	20	21	21
(India) R Kapoor (India) R Gadde	22	19	17
(Hong Kong) Chan Y C (Hong Kong) Ng T Y	22	21
(Germany) M Seidel (Germany) T P Nguyen	20	11
(Czech Republic) O Král (Czech Republic) T Švábíková	17	16
(England) C Hemming (England) E van Leeuwen	21	21
(South Korea) Kim J-h (South Korea) Jang H-j	21	16	18
(United States) Chen Z-y (United States) F Corbett	14	21	21

Second round
1	(China) Feng YZ (China) Huang DP	21	21
(Canada) J Lai (Canada) C Lai	13	8
16	(Japan) Y Watanabe (Japan) M Taguchi	21	21
(Hong Kong) Chan Y C (Hong Kong) Ng T Y	14	13
8	(China) Cheng X (China) Zhang C	21	21
(England) C Hemming (England) E van Leeuwen	16	13
10	(Malaysia) Goh S H (Malaysia) S J Lai	21	21
(United States) Chen Z-y (United States) F Corbett	15	16

Third round
1	(China) Feng YZ (China) Huang DP	21	21
16	(Japan) Y Watanabe (Japan) M Taguchi	19	18
8	(China) Cheng X (China) Zhang C	21	21
10	(Malaysia) Goh S H (Malaysia) S J Lai	15	12

Quarter-finals
1	(China) Feng YZ (China) Huang DP	18	21	21
8	(China) Cheng X (China) Zhang C	21	10	15

==== Section 2 ====
First round
(Indonesia) M Faza (Indonesia) A Pranata	21	21
(Serbia) M Tomić (Serbia) A Vitman	16	14
(Brazil) D Silva (Brazil) S Lima	16	24	15
(England) S Jones (England) L Tolman	21	22	21
(Malaysia) Wong T C (Malaysia) Lim C S	16	3
PFR	(Indonesia) R N Kusharjanto (Indonesia) G E Widjaja	21	21
PFR	(India) A Surya (India) A Pramuthesh	21	29	22
(Turkey) E Sönmez (Turkey) Y Bektaş	16	30	24

Second round
3	(Denmark) M Christiansen (Denmark) A Bøje	19	21	21
(Indonesia) M Faza (Indonesia) A Pranata	21	9	10
11	(Chinese Taipei) Yang P-h (Chinese Taipei) Hu L-f	21	29
(England) S Jones (England) L Tolman	14	27
9	(Chinese Taipei) Ye H-w (Chinese Taipei) N G Chan	9	21	21
PFR	(Indonesia) R N Kusharjanto (Indonesia) G E Widjaja	21	18	19
SWM	(Indonesia) A Syahnawi (Indonesia) N V Marwah	21	21
(Turkey) E Sönmez (Turkey) Y Bektaş	14	10

Third round
3	(Denmark) M Christiansen (Denmark) A Bøje	13	21	14
11	(Chinese Taipei) Yang P-h (Chinese Taipei) Hu L-f	21	9	21
9	(Chinese Taipei) Ye H-w (Chinese Taipei) N G Chan	5	18
SWM	(Indonesia) A Syahnawi (Indonesia) N V Marwah	21	21

Quarter-finals
11	(Chinese Taipei) Yang P-h (Chinese Taipei) Hu L-f	18	9
SWM	(Indonesia) A Syahnawi (Indonesia) N V Marwah	21	21

=== Bottom half ===
==== Section 3 ====
First round
(Brazil) F Farias (Brazil) J Lima	21	19	21
(Germany) S Krax (Germany) A Lehmann	14	21	14
(Sweden) F Karlborg (Sweden) T Sjöö	19	16
(Denmark) K Kolding (Denmark) M Werge	21	21
(France) J Maio (France) L Palermo	12	21	20
PFR	(Indonesia) B Prasetyo (Indonesia) T Munggaran	21	13	22
(Chinese Taipei) Wu G-x (Chinese Taipei) Lee C-h	13	16
(Spain) R García (Spain) L Rodríguez	21	21

Second round
(Brazil) F Farias (Brazil) J Lima	10	3
14	(United States) P Smith (United States) J Gai	21	21
(Denmark) K Kolding (Denmark) M Werge	16	12
5	(France) T Gicquel (France) D Delrue	21	21
PFR	(Indonesia) B Prasetyo (Indonesia) T Munggaran	13	16
13	(Japan) Y Shimogami (Japan) S Hobara	21	21
(Spain) R García (Spain) L Rodríguez	21	11	15
4	(Thailand) D Puavaranukroh (Thailand) S Paewsampran	14	21	21

Third round
14	(United States) P Smith (United States) J Gai	22	16
5	(France) T Gicquel (France) D Delrue	24	21
13	(Japan) Y Shimogami (Japan) S Hobara	21	12	17
4	(Thailand) D Puavaranukroh (Thailand) S Paewsampran	17	21	21

Quarter-finals
5	(France) T Gicquel (France) D Delrue	w	/	o
4	(Thailand) D Puavaranukroh (Thailand) S Paewsampran

==== Section 4 ====
First round
(Macau) Leong I C (Macau) Ng W C	21	21
(Netherlands) B Wassink (Netherlands) D Jille	15	18
(Canada) T Lock (Canada) C Hoang	19	14
(Netherlands) A Buijk (Netherlands) M Loos	21	21
(Scotland) A Dunn (Scotland) J MacPherson	21	21
(New Zealand) E Lau (New Zealand) S Li	14	18
(Switzerland) N Franconville (Switzerland) J Franconville	21	16	21
(Bulgaria) E Panev (Bulgaria) G Stoeva	19	21	19

Second round
(Macau) Leong I C (Macau) Ng W C	11	11
15	(India) D Kapila (India) T Crasto	21	21
(Netherlands) A Buijk (Netherlands) M Loos	5	9
6	(China) Guo XW (China) Chen FH	21	21
(Scotland) A Dunn (Scotland) J MacPherson	8^{r}
12	(Thailand) Pak Teeraratsakul (Thailand) S Taerattanachai	18
(Switzerland) N Franconville (Switzerland) J Franconville	7	11
2	(China) Jiang ZB (China) Wei YX	21	21

Third round
15	(India) D Kapila (India) T Crasto	16	5
6	(China) Guo XW (China) Chen FH	21	21
12	(Thailand) Pak Teeraratsakul (Thailand) S Taerattanachai	12	17
2	(China) Jiang ZB (China) Wei YX	21	21

Quarter-finals
6	(China) Guo XW (China) Chen FH	13	17
2	(China) Jiang ZB (China) Wei YX	21	21
