= Nita Violina Marwah =

Indonesian badminton player (born 2001)

Personal information
- Born: 25 March 2001 (age 25) Majalengka, West Java, Indonesia
- Height: 1.70 m (5 ft 7 in)
- Weight: 63 kg (139 lb)

Sport
- Country: Indonesia
- Sport: Badminton
- Handedness: Right

Women's & mixed doubles
- Highest ranking: 35 (WD with Putri Syaikah, 9 November 2021); 14 (XD with Amri Syahnawi, 6 October 2026); 35 (XD with Adnan Maulana, 19 June 2023)
- Current ranking: 9 (XD with Amri Syahnawi, 27 October 2026)
- BWF profile
Medal record
Women's badminton
Representing Indonesia
World Championships
Bronze medal – third place	2026 New Delhi	Mixed doubles
Asian Games
Silver medal – second place	2026 Aichi–Nagoya	Mixed doubles
Bronze medal – third place	2026 Aichi–Nagoya	Women's team
Asia Team Championships
Gold medal – first place	2022 Selangor	Women's team
SEA Games
Silver medal – second place	2025 Thailand	Women's team
World Junior Championships
Gold medal – first place	2019 Kazan	Mixed team
Bronze medal – third place	2018 Markham	Mixed team
Asian Junior Championships
Silver medal – second place	2019 Suzhou	Mixed team

Nita Violina Marwah (born 25 March 2001) is an Indonesian badminton player affiliated with Exist Jakarta club. Together with Amri Syahnawi, she won the silver medal at the 2026 Asian Games and a bronze medal at the 2026 World Championships in the mixed doubles. The pair subsequently broke into the top 10 of the BWF world rankings on 27 October 2026.

Marwah was part of the national junior team that won the first Suhandinata Cup for Indonesia in the 2019 BWF World Junior Championships. She also featured in the Indonesian women's winning team at the 2022 Asia Team Championships.

== Career ==
=== 2023 ===
In February, Marwah started the season with new partner Adnan Maulana playing in mixed doubles, and reach the semi-finals of Iran Fajr International.

In March, Marwah and Maulana reached the finals of Thailand International. At the end of March, they competed in the European tour at the Spain Masters, but had to lose in the second round from Danish pair Mathias Thyrri and Amalie Magelund. In the next tour, they lost in the semi-finals of Orléans Masters in France from Chinese Taipei pair Ye Hong-wei and Lee Chia-hsin.

In May, Marwah alongside the Indonesian team competed at the 2023 Sudirman Cup in Suzhou, China. He played a match in the group stage, won against Adam Dong and Josephine Wu of Canada. Indonesia advanced to the knockout stage but lost at the quarterfinals against China. In the next tournament, they lost in qualifying rounds of Malaysia Masters from Malaysian pair Chan Peng Soon and Cheah Yee See. In the next tour, they competed in the Thailand Open, but lost in the second round from 1st seed and eventual finalist Thai pair Dechapol Puavaranukroh and Sapsiree Taerattanachai.

In June, Marwah and Maulana competed at the home tournament, Indonesia Open, but lost in the first round from 1st seed Chinese player Zheng Siwei and Huang Yaqiong. In the next tour, they competed in the Taipei Open, but lost in the first round from Thai pair Ruttanapak Oupthong and Jhenicha Sudjaipraparat.

In early August, Marwah and Maulana competed at the Australian Open, but had to lose in the second round from 2nd seed Chinese pair Feng Yanzhe and Huang Dongping in straight games.

=== 2025–2026 ===
In December, she competed at the SEA Games, winning a silver medal in the women's team event. Partnered with Syahnawi in the individual mixed doubles, they were eliminated in the first round.

Marwah and Syahnawi's breakthrough came in 2026, when the pair won a bronze medal at the World Championships. Marwah then made her debut at the Aichi–Nagoya Asian Games, winning silver in the mixed doubles and bronze in the women's team event. In October, she and Syahnawi reached a career-high ranking of world number 9 in the BWF world rankings.

== Achievements ==
=== BWF World Championships ===
Mixed doubles
Year	Venue	Partner	Opponent	Score	Result	Ref.
2026	Indira Gandhi Arena; New Delhi, India	(Indonesia) Amri Syahnawi	(China) Feng Yanzhe (China) Huang Dongping	22–20, 14–21, 20–22	Bronze	

=== Asian Games ===
Mixed doubles
Year	Venue	Partner	Opponent	Score	Result	Ref.
2026	Ichinomiya City Municipal Gymnasium; Ichinomiya, Japan	(Indonesia) Amri Syahnawi	(China) Jiang Zhenbang (China) Wei Yaxin	19–21, 8–21	Silver	

=== BWF World Tour (1 title, 1 runner-up) ===
The BWF World Tour, which was announced on 19 March 2017 and implemented in 2018, is a series of elite badminton tournaments sanctioned by the Badminton World Federation (BWF). The BWF World Tours are divided into levels of World Tour Finals, Super 1000, Super 750, Super 500, Super 300 (part of the HSBC World Tour), and the BWF Tour Super 100.

Women's doubles
Year	Tournament	Level	Partner	Opponent	Score	Result	Ref.
2019	Akita Masters	Super 100	(Indonesia) Putri Syaikah	(Japan) Ayako Sakuramoto (Japan) Yukiko Takahata	17–21, 21–14, 15–21	(silver) Runner-up	

Mixed doubles
Year	Tournament	Level	Partner	Opponent	Score	Result	Ref.
2024 (II)	Indonesia Masters	Super 100	(Indonesia) Amri Syahnawi	(Indonesia) Marwan Faza (Indonesia) Aisyah Pranata	22–20, 21–13	(gold) Winner	

=== BWF International Challenge/Series (4 titles, 2 runners-up) ===
Women's doubles
Year	Tournament	Partner	Opponent	Score	Result
2018	Turkey International	(Indonesia) Putri Syaikah	(Indonesia) Metya Inayah Cindiani (Indonesia) Indah Cahya Sari Jamil	21–15, 21–7	(gold) Winner
2019	Iran Fajr International	(Indonesia) Putri Syaikah	(Turkey) Bengisu Erçetin (Turkey) Nazlıcan İnci	21–17, 21–18	(gold) Winner
2019	Vietnam International	(Indonesia) Putri Syaikah	(Chinese Taipei) Hsieh Pei-shan (Chinese Taipei) Lin Xiao-min	21–19, 21–16	(gold) Winner

Mixed doubles
Year	Tournament	Partner	Opponent	Score	Result	Ref.
2023	Thailand International	(Indonesia) Adnan Maulana	(Thailand) Ruttanapak Oupthong (Thailand) Jhenicha Sudjaipraparat	13–21, 19–21	(silver) Runner-up	
2024	Malaysia International	(Indonesia) Amri Syahnawi	(Indonesia) Adnan Maulana (Indonesia) Indah Cahya Sari Jamil	22–24, 21–11, 21–19	(gold) Winner	
2024 (II)	Indonesia International	(Indonesia) Amri Syahnawi	(Indonesia) Jafar Hidayatullah (Indonesia) Felisha Pasaribu	13–21, 15–21	(silver) Runner-up	

BWF International Challenge tournament
BWF International Series tournament

=== BWF Junior International (2 titles, 2 runners-up) ===
Girls' doubles
Year	Tournament	Partner	Opponent	Score	Result
2019	Dutch Junior International	(Indonesia) Putri Syaikah	(China) Luo Xumin (China) Zhou Xinru	21–16, 21–16	(gold) Winner
2019	German Junior	(Indonesia) Putri Syaikah	(China) Guo Lizhi (China) Li Yijing	21–16, 19–21, 20–22	(silver) Runner-up
2019	Jaya Raya Junior International	(Indonesia) Putri Syaikah	(China) Luo Xumin (China) Zhou Xinru	16–21, 18–21	(silver) Runner-up

Mixed doubles
Year	Tournament	Partner	Opponent	Score	Result
2019	Dutch Junior International	(Indonesia) Daniel Marthin	(China) Feng Yanzhe (China) Lin Fangling	21–19, 21–18	(gold) Winner

BWF Junior International Grand Prix tournament
BWF Junior International Challenge tournament
BWF Junior International Series tournament
BWF Junior Future Series tournament

== Performance timeline ==
Key

W	Won	F	Finalist	SF	Semi-finalist
QF	Quarter-finalist	#R	Rounds 4, 3, 2, 1	RR	Round-robin stage
Q#	Qualification round	A	Absent	w/d	Withdrew
G	Gold	S	Silver	B	Bronze
NH	Not held	N/A	Not applicable	DNQ	Did not qualify

=== National team ===
- Junior level

Team events	2018	2019
Asian Junior Championships	A	S
World Junior Championships	B	G

- Senior level

Team events	2020	2021	2022	2023	2024	2025	2026	Ref
SEA Games	NH	A	NH	A	NH	S	NH	
Asia Team Championships	A	NH	G	NH	A	NH	A	
Asian Games	NH		A	NH			B	
Uber Cup	QF	NH	QF	NH	A	NH	A	
Sudirman Cup	NH	A	NH	QF	NH	A	NH	

=== Individual competitions ===
==== Junior level ====
Girls' doubles

Events	2018	2019
Asian Junior Championships	2R	2R
World Junior Championships	4R	QF

Mixed doubles

Events	2019
Asian Junior Championships	3R

==== Senior level ====
===== Women's doubles =====
Events	2021	2022
World Championships	A	A

Tournament	BWF World Tour					Best	Ref
Tournament	2018	2019	2020	2021	2022	Best	Ref
Spain Masters	A			QF	NH	QF ('21)	
Orléans Masters	A		NH	2R	A	2R ('21)	
Indonesia Masters	A		Q1	1R	A	1R ('21)	
Indonesia Open	A		NH	1R	A	1R ('21)	
Akita Masters	A	F	NH			F ('19)	
Vietnam Open	A		NH		QF	QF ('22)	
Indonesia Masters Super 100	2R	A	NH		QF	QF ('22)	
Denmark Open	A			2R	A	2R ('21)	
French Open	A		NH	2R	A	2R ('21)	
Hylo Open	A			QF	A	QF ('21)	
Macau Open	A	1R	NH			1R ('19)	
Year-end ranking	154	57	62	37	117	35	
Tournament	2018	2019	2020	2021	2022	Best	Ref

===== Mixed doubles =====
Event	2024	2025	2026	Ref
SEA Games	NH	1R	NH	
Asian Championships	1R	2R	2R	
Asian Games	NH		S	
World Championships	NH	DNQ	B	

Tournament	BWF World Tour									Best	Ref
Tournament	2018	2019	2020	2021	2022	2023	2024	2025	2026	Best	Ref
Indonesia Masters	A						1R	1R	1R	1R ('24, '25, '26)	
Thailand Masters	A			NH		A	1R	QF	SF	SF ('26)	
German Open	A		NH		A			1R	A	1R ('25)	
All England Open	A								QF	QF ('26)	
Swiss Open	A		NH	A			1R	A	SF	SF ('26)	
Orléans Masters	A					SF	A	2R	QF	SF ('23)	
Thailand Open	A			NH	A	2R	2R	SF	2R	SF ('25)	
Malaysia Masters	A			NH	A	Q1	1R	2R	2R	2R ('25, '26)	
Indonesia Open	A		NH	A		1R	2R	2R	2R	2R ('24, '25, '26)	
Australian Open	A		NH		QF	2R	A			QF ('22)	
Macau Open	A		NH				A	SF	A	SF ('25)	
Japan Open	A		NH		A			2R	1R	2R ('25)	
China Open	A		NH			A		2R	1R	2R ('25)	
Taipei Open	A		NH		A	1R	A	2R	A	2R ('25)	
Korea Masters	A		NH		A	2R	A			2R ('23)	
China Masters	A		NH			A		2R	A	2R ('25)	
Indonesia Masters Super 100	1R	A	NH		2R	A	SF	A		W ('24 II)	
Indonesia Masters Super 100	1R	A	NH		2R	A	W	A		W ('24 II)	
Vietnam Open	A		NH		A		1R	A		1R ('24)	
Denmark Open	A							1R	1R	1R ('25, '26)	
French Open	A		NH	A				1R	QF	QF ('26)	
Hylo Open	A							2R	SF	SF ('26)	
Korea Open	A		NH		A			SF	A	SF ('25)	
Japan Masters	NH					A			2R	2R ('26)	
Hong Kong Open	A		NH			2R	A	1R	2R	2R ('23, '26)	
Guwahati Masters	NH					2R	A			2R ('23)	
Odisha Masters	NH				A	SF	A			SF ('23)	
Spain Masters	A				NH	2R	2R	NH		2R ('23', '24)	
Year-end ranking	263	271	256	362	134	38	65	19		9	
Tournament	2018	2019	2020	2021	2022	2023	2024	2025	2026	Best	Ref
