= 2019 Badminton Asia Junior Championships – Mixed doubles =

Tournament details
- Dates: 24 – 28 July 2019
- Edition: 22
- Venue: Suzhou Olympic Sports Centre
- Location: Suzhou, China

The mixed doubles tournament of the 2019 Badminton Asia Junior Championships will be held from 24 to 28 July. Guo Xinwa / Liu Xuanxuan from China clinched this title in the last edition.

== Seeds ==
Seeds were announced on 2 July.

1. (Indonesia) Leo Rolly Carnando / Indah Cahya Sari Jamil (champions)
2. (China) Feng Yanzhe / Lin Fangling (final)
3. (China) Jiang Zhenbang / Li Yijing (semifinals)
4. (South Korea) Ki Dong-ju / Lee Eun-ji (third round)
5. (Indonesia) Dwiki Rafian Restu / Nita Violina Marwah (third round)
6. (Thailand) Sirawit Sothon / Pornnicha Suwatnodom (quarterfinals)
7. (Thailand) Ratchapol Makkasasithorn / Peeraya Khantaruangsakul (third round)
8. (China) Zheng Xunjin / Keng Shuliang (second round)

== Draw ==
=== Finals ===
Quarterfinals
1 | (Indonesia) Leo Rolly Carnando (Indonesia) Indah Cahya Sari Jamil | 21 | 19 | 21
(Malaysia) Yap Roy King (Malaysia) Gan Jing Err | 11 | 21 | 13
3 | (China) Jiang Zhenbang (China) Li Yijing | 21 | 21
6 | (Thailand) Sirawit Sothon (Thailand) Pornnicha Suwatnodom | 18 | 5
(China) Chen Xujun (China) Zhang Chi | 13 | 21 | 21
(Hong Kong) Ko Shing Hei (Hong Kong) Yeung Pui Lam | 21 | 16 | 18
(South Korea) Kim Joon-young (South Korea) Ji Young-bin | 16 | 17
2 | (China) Feng Yanzhe (China) Lin Fangling | 21 | 21

Semifinals
1 | (Indonesia) Leo Rolly Carnando (Indonesia) Indah Cahya Sari Jamil | 21 | 21
3 | (China) Jiang Zhenbang (China) Li Yijing | 17 | 16
(China) Chen Xujun (China) Zhang Chi | 8 | 13
2 | (China) Feng Yanzhe (China) Lin Fangling | 21 | 21

Final
1 | (Indonesia) Leo Rolly Carnando (Indonesia) Indah Cahya Sari Jamil | 16 | 22 | 22
2 | (China) Feng Yanzhe (China) Lin Fangling | 21 | 20 | 20

=== Top half ===
==== Section 1 ====
First round
(South Korea) Lee M-s (South Korea) Kim S-j | 21 | 21
(Mongolia) S Enkhbat (Mongolia) K Darkhanbaatar | 6 | 8
(India) M S Khwairakpam (India) M Riza | 21 | 21 | 12
(Hong Kong) Hung K C (Hong Kong) Tsang H Y | 9 | 23 | 21

Second round
1 | (Indonesia) L R Carnando (Indonesia) I C S Jamil | 21 | 21
(Thailand) K Vitidsarn (Thailand) Y Chuencharoen | 15 | 16
(Nepal) P Dahal (Nepal) J Gurung | 9 | 3
(South Korea) Lee M-s (South Korea) Kim S-j | 21 | 21
8 | (China) Zheng XJ (China) Keng SL | 18 | 19
(Chinese Taipei) Wu G-x (Chinese Taipei) Ting Y-y | 21 | 21
(Malaysia) Yap R K (Malaysia) Gan J E | 21 | 17 | 22
(Hong Kong) Hung K C (Hong Kong) Tsang H Y | 19 | 21 | 20

Third round
1 | (Indonesia) L R Carnando (Indonesia) I C S Jamil | 21 | 21
(South Korea) Lee M-s (South Korea) Kim S-j | 9 | 16
(Chinese Taipei) Wu G-x (Chinese Taipei) Ting Y-y | 15 | 14
(Malaysia) Yap R K (Malaysia) Gan J E | 21 | 21

Quarterfinals
1 | (Indonesia) L R Carnando (Indonesia) I C S Jamil | 21 | 19 | 21
(Malaysia) Yap R K (Malaysia) Gan J E | 11 | 21 | 13

==== Section 2 ====
First round
(South Korea) Noh M-w (South Korea) Kim A-y | 20 | 18
(India) D S Konthoujam (India) R Thaker | 22 | 21
(Chinese Taipei) Yu S-p (Chinese Taipei) Tung C-t | 21 | 21
(Malaysia) Ooi J D (Malaysia) Go P K | 15 | 13

Second round
3 | (China) Jiang ZB (China) Li YJ | 21 | 21
(Hong Kong) Lui C W (Hong Kong) Leung S L | 15 | 7
(Indonesia) M R Alfarez (Indonesia) N A D Ulhaq | 21 | 21
(India) D S Konthoujam (India) R Thaker | 12 | 16
6 | (Thailand) S Sothon (Thailand) P Suwatnodom | 21 | 21
(Singapore) A Yong (Singapore) J Koh | 8 | 18
(China) Liu DW (China) Yang JY | 21 | 19 | 21
(Chinese Taipei) Yu S-p (Chinese Taipei) Tung C-t | 14 | 21 | 19

Third round
3 | (China) Jiang ZB (China) Li YJ | 21 | 21
(Indonesia) M R Alfarez (Indonesia) N A D Ulhaq | 9 | 10
6 | (Thailand) S Sothon (Thailand) P Suwatnodom | 21 | 21
(China) Liu DW (China) Yang JY | 15 | 11

Quarterfinals
3 | (China) Jiang ZB (China) Li YJ | 21 | 21
6 | (Thailand) S Sothon (Thailand) P Suwatnodom | 18 | 5

=== Bottom half ===
==== Section 3 ====
First round
(Vietnam) Nguyen D H (Vietnam) Vu T A T | 15 | 14
(Thailand) A Teerawiwat (Thailand) P Chaiwan | 21 | 21

Second round
(India) E Joy (India) S Mishra | 13 | 9
(China) Chen XJ (China) Zhang C | 21 | 21
(Malaysia) Loo B K (Malaysia) V Siow | 8 | 21
5 | (Indonesia) D R Restu (Indonesia) N V Marwah | 21 | 23
(Thailand) A Teerawiwat (Thailand) P Chaiwan | 18 | 21
(Hong Kong) Ko S H (Hong Kong) Yeung P L | 21 | 23
(Chinese Taipei) Wei C-w (Chinese Taipei) Jiang P-y | 17 | 13
4 | (South Korea) Ki D-j (South Korea) Lee E-j | 21 | 21

Third round
(China) Chen XJ (China) Zhang C | 9 | 21 | 21
5 | (Indonesia) D R Restu (Indonesia) N V Marwah | 21 | 18 | 17
(Hong Kong) Ko S H (Hong Kong) Yeung P L | 21 | 21
4 | (South Korea) Ki D-j (South Korea) Lee E-j | 18 | 16

Quarterfinals
(China) Chen XJ (China) Zhang C | 13 | 21 | 21
(Hong Kong) Ko S H (Hong Kong) Yeung P L | 21 | 16 | 18

==== Section 4 ====
First round
(Malaysia) Ching K F (Malaysia) Teoh L X | 15 | 21 | 15
(South Korea) Kim J-y (South Korea) Ji Y-b | 21 | 18 | 21
(Chinese Taipei) Chiang C-w (Chinese Taipei) Wang X-y | 22 | 21
(Hong Kong) J Gunawan (Hong Kong) Cheng S Y | 20 | 11

Second round
(South Korea) Kim J-y (South Korea) Ji Y-b | 21 | 21
(China) Zeng WH (China) Zhang JE | 19 | 7
(Sri Lanka) L De Silva (Sri Lanka) D Dias | 12 | 11
7 | (Thailand) R Makkasasithorn (Thailand) P Khantaruangsakul | 21 | 21
(Chinese Taipei) Chiang C-w (Chinese Taipei) Wang X-y | 18 | 17
(Indonesia) A T Tololiu (Indonesia) D D Cahyaning | 21 | 21
(Nepal) P Maharjan (Nepal) S Rajbanshi | 4 | 2
2 | (China) Feng YZ (China) Lin FL | 21 | 21

Third round
(South Korea) Kim J-y (South Korea) Ji Y-b | 18 | 21 | 25
7 | (Thailand) R Makkasasithorn (Thailand) P Khantaruangsakul | 21 | 17 | 23
(Indonesia) A T Tololiu (Indonesia) D D Cahyaning | 8 | 13
2 | (China) Feng YZ (China) Lin FL | 21 | 21

Quarterfinals
(South Korea) Kim J-y (South Korea) Ji Y-b | 16 | 17
2 | (China) Feng YZ (China) Lin FL | 21 | 21
