= Jiang Zhenbang =

Chinese badminton player (born 2001)

Jiang Zhenbang 蒋振邦
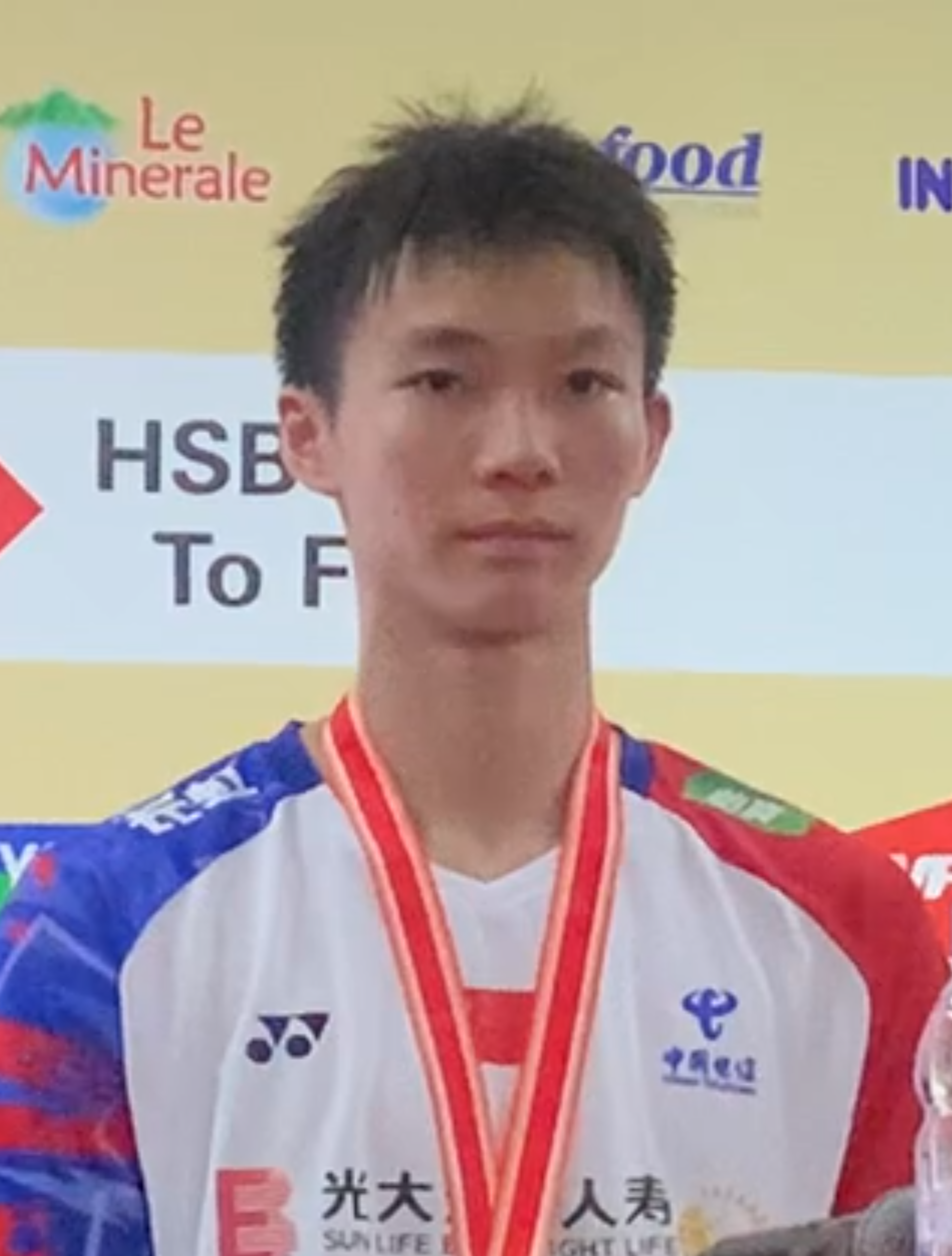
- Jiang at the 2024 Indonesia Open

Personal information
- Born: 28 May 2001 (age 25) Guilin, Guangxi, China
- Height: 1.84 m (6 ft 0 in)

Sport
- Country: China
- Sport: Badminton
- Handedness: Right

Mixed doubles
- Highest ranking: 1 (with Wei Yaxin, 18 March 2025)
- Current ranking: 2 (with Wei Yaxin, 6 October 2026)
- BWF profile
Medal record
Men's badminton
Representing China
World Championships
Silver medal – second place	2025 Paris	Mixed doubles
Bronze medal – third place	2023 Copenhagen	Mixed doubles
Bronze medal – third place	2026 New Delhi	Mixed doubles
Sudirman Cup
Gold medal – first place	2025 Xiamen	Mixed team
Asian Games
Gold medal – first place	2026 Aichi–Nagoya	Mixed doubles
Silver medal – second place	2026 Aichi–Nagoya	Men's team
Asian Championships
Gold medal – first place	2023 Dubai	Mixed doubles
Bronze medal – third place	2024 Ningbo	Mixed doubles
Bronze medal – third place	2025 Ningbo	Mixed doubles
Asia Mixed Team Championships
Gold medal – first place	2023 Dubai	Mixed team
World Junior Championships
Silver medal – second place	2019 Kazan	Mixed team
Bronze medal – third place	2019 Kazan	Mixed doubles
Asian Junior Championships
Bronze medal – third place	2019 Suzhou	Mixed doubles
Bronze medal – third place	2019 Suzhou	Mixed team

Jiang Zhenbang (simplified Chinese: 蒋振邦; traditional Chinese: 蔣振邦; pinyin: Jiǎng Zhènbāng; born 28 May 2001) is a Chinese badminton player. Partnering Wei Yaxin, he has won medals at the World Championships, Asian Games, and Asian Championships, and the pair attained the world No. 1 ranking for the first time on 18 March 2025. Jiang was also part of the Chinese national team that claimed the Sudirman Cup in 2025.

== Early life and background ==
Jiang was born on 28 May 2001 in Guilin, Guangxi, China. As a child, he showed an interest in various sports, particularly football, influenced by his father, Jiang Neng, a former player for the local police football team. In 2007, he joined a local badminton club under coaches Liu Zhongxing and Hu Ning. After witnessing Lin Dan's victory at the 2008 Beijing Olympics, Jiang's father encouraged him to focus solely on badminton, to which he agreed. Jiang's mother, Peng Juan, even left her job to support his training.

In 2009, while participating in a national junior badminton tournament in Guilin, Jiang's performance caught the attention of Cheng Yan, the head coach of the Shanghai Children's Sports School badminton team. Later that year, at nine years old, Jiang moved to Shanghai and joined the Huangpu badminton team under coach Yang Ting. Supported by local sports authorities, he enrolled at Ruijin Erlu Primary School and lived in an athlete dormitory. At 11, he was selected for the Shanghai Sports School's intensive training program. In 2014, he joined the Shanghai badminton team.

== Career ==
=== 2018–2021: Junior and early senior career ===
In 2018, Jiang earned a place on China's national second team and began competing in junior international tournaments in both boys' and mixed doubles. The following year, he achieved several solid results, including bronze medals in the mixed doubles event at the Asian and the World Junior Championships. In 2021, he advanced to the first team, becoming the first male player from Guilin to do so, and specialized in mixed doubles.

=== 2022 ===
In October, Jiang returned to international competition after the pandemic, forming a new partnership with Wei Yaxin. At their first tournament together, the Indonesia International in Malang, they finished as runners-up to Dejan Ferdinansyah and Gloria Emanuelle Widjaja. A week later, the pair secured their maiden title at the Indonesia Masters Super 100, defeating compatriots Cheng Xing and Chen Fanghui in straight games. They continued their momentum in November by winning the Vietnam International and concluded the season with a runner-up finish at the Malaysia International.

=== 2023 ===
2023 was a breakthrough year for Jiang and Wei. They started the season by reaching the final of the Indonesia Masters as qualifiers, where they placed second to teammates Feng Yanzhe and Huang Dongping. Jiang was also part of China's team that won the 2023 Asia Mixed Team Championships.

Following this, he and Wei won the Ruichang China Masters and then earned their first BWF World Tour title at the Swiss Open, edging Malaysians Goh Soon Huat and Shevon Jemie Lai 21–17, 19–21, 21–17 in the final. They also captured the 2023 Asian Championships crown after overcoming seniors Zheng Siwei and Huang Yaqiong in two straight games.

In the second half of the year, the pair were runners-up at the Korea Open and went on to take a bronze medal on their World Championships debut, where they fell to Zheng Siwei and Huang Yaqiong in the semi-finals. They also lost in the final of Arctic Open.

The duo then secured their first Super 750 title at the French Open by beating veterans Tang Chun Man and Tse Ying Suet in three games and added another runner-up finish at the Korea Masters. At the BWF Awards in December, Jiang and Wei were named Most Improved Player of the Year, in recognition of their rapid rise in the world rankings.

=== 2024 ===
Jiang and Wei began the year by reaching the semi-finals of the Malaysia Open, before placing second at the India Open to former world champions Dechapol Puavaranukroh and Sapsiree Taerattanachai. A few months later, they were stopped in the last four of the 2024 Asian Championships and settled for bronze.

The pair then produced a string of strong results, triumphing against Zheng Siwei and Huang Yaqiong 21–11, 21–14 to claim their first Super 1000 crown at the Indonesia Open, followed by another title at the Australian Open the next week. They also won the Japan Open in August and captured their fourth title in five tournaments played at the Hong Kong Open.

In the following months, he and Wei finished as runners-up in consecutive finals at the Arctic Open and Denmark Open, both to Feng Yanzhe and Huang Dongping. The duo also made their debut at the World Tour Finals, where they reached the semi-finals before falling to Olympic and eventual champions Zheng Siwei and Huang Yaqiong.

=== 2025 ===
At the India Open, Jiang and Wei claimed the title, improving on their runner-up finish from the previous season. He also began a short partnership with Huang Dongping at the All England Open, where they reached the semi-finals, but the pair did not achieve notable results afterwards. On 18 March, he and Wei rose to world number 1 for the first time.

Back with his regular partner, Jiang secured a second consecutive bronze medal at the 2025 Asian Championships and earned his first Sudirman Cup medal after contributing to China's triumph at the 2025 Sudirman Cup. He and Wei also placed second at the Malaysia Masters.

In July, the pair defended their Japan Open crown, defeating Dechapol Puavaranukroh and Supissara Paewsampran for their first title together since January, before finishing as runners-up at the China Open the following week. Seeded second at the 2025 World Championships, they advanced to the final but lost 15–21, 14–21 to Chen Tang Jie and Toh Ee Wei, settling for silver.

Later in the season, Jiang and Wei reached the Korea Open final before finishing second. They went on to win the Arctic Open in October, followed by another final appearance at the Denmark Open the following week. At the year-end World Tour Finals, they finished as runners-up to Feng Yanzhe and Huang Dongping, bringing their head-to-head record against Feng and Huang to 3–14.

=== 2026 ===
At the season opener in Malaysia, Jiang and Wei lost to familiar rivals Feng/Huang in the final. In March, their campaign at the All England Open ended in the quarter-finals. They subsequently withdrew from next month's 2026 Asian Championships. Jiang was then scheduled to compete alongside Li Yijing in May to mid-June but the new duo withdrew from all events. (Note: Thailand Open, Malaysia Masters, Singapore Open, Indonesia Open, and Australian Open.)

He and Wei reunited after three months at the Macau Open and captured the title on their first tournament back as a pair. The pair claimed their second Worlds bronze medal at the 2026 World Championships. Jiang made his Asian Games debut in September, capturing silver as a part of China's men's team. He and Wei also competed in the mixed doubles event where they faced Amri Syahnawi and Nita Violina Marwah in the final. The duo came from behind in the opening game before winning 21–19, 21–8 to claim the gold medal.

Fresh off their Asian Games success, the pair reached their fourth consecutive Arctic Open final and successfully defended their title. The following week, they defeated three-time defending champions Feng/Huang in the final to win the Denmark Open.

== Achievements ==
=== World Championships ===
Mixed doubles
Year	Venue	Partner	Opponent	Score	Result
2023	Royal Arena, Copenhagen, Denmark	(China) Wei Yaxin	(China) Zheng Siwei (China) Huang Yaqiong	18–21, 16–21	Bronze
2025	Adidas Arena, Paris, France	(China) Wei Yaxin	(Malaysia) Chen Tang Jie (Malaysia) Toh Ee Wei	15–21, 14–21	Silver
2026	Indira Gandhi Arena, New Delhi, India	(China) Wei Yaxin	(France) Thom Gicquel (France) Delphine Delrue	21–19, 13–21, 11–21	Bronze

=== Asian Games ===
Mixed doubles
Year	Venue	Partner	Opponent	Score	Result
2026	Ichinomiya City Municipal Gymnasium, Ichinomiya, Japan	(China) Wei Yaxin	(Indonesia) Amri Syahnawi (Indonesia) Nita Violina Marwah	21–19, 21–8	Gold

=== Asian Championships ===
Mixed doubles
Year	Venue	Partner	Opponent	Score	Result
2023	Sheikh Rashid Bin Hamdan Indoor Hall, Dubai, United Arab Emirates	(China) Wei Yaxin	(China) Zheng Siwei (China) Huang Yaqiong	21–15, 21–16	Gold
2024	Ningbo Olympic Sports Center Gymnasium, Ningbo, China	(China) Wei Yaxin	(China) Feng Yanzhe (China) Huang Dongping	10–21, 14–21	Bronze
2025	Ningbo Olympic Sports Center Gymnasium, Ningbo, China	(China) Wei Yaxin	(Hong Kong) Tang Chun Man (Hong Kong) Tse Ying Suet	16–21, 17–21	Bronze

=== World Junior Championships ===
Mixed doubles
Year	Venue	Partner	Opponent	Score	Result
2019	Kazan Gymnastics Center; Kazan, Russia	(China) Li Yijing	(Indonesia) Leo Rolly Carnando (Indonesia) Indah Cahya Sari Jamil	21–23, 21–12, 19–21	Bronze

=== Asian Junior Championships ===
Mixed doubles
Year	Venue	Partner	Opponent	Score	Result
2019	Suzhou Olympic Sports Centre; Suzhou, China	(China) Li Yijing	(Indonesia) Leo Rolly Carnando (Indonesia) Indah Cahya Sari Jamil	17–21, 16–21	Bronze

=== BWF World Tour (16 titles, 14 runners-up) ===
The BWF World Tour, which was announced on 19 March 2017 and implemented in 2018, is a series of elite badminton tournaments sanctioned by the Badminton World Federation (BWF). The BWF World Tour is divided into levels of World Tour Finals, Super 1000, Super 750, Super 500, Super 300, and the BWF Tour Super 100.

Mixed doubles
Year	Tournament	Level	Partner	Opponent	Score	Result
2022	Indonesia Masters	Super 100	(China) Wei Yaxin	(China) Cheng Xing (China) Chen Fanghui	21–12, 21–15	(gold) Winner
2023	Indonesia Masters	Super 500	(China) Wei Yaxin	(China) Feng Yanzhe (China) Huang Dongping	15–21, 21–16, 19–21	(silver) Runner-up
2023	Ruichang China Masters	Super 100	(China) Wei Yaxin	(China) Cheng Xing (China) Chen Fanghui	21–15, 21–8	(gold) Winner
2023	Swiss Open	Super 300	(China) Wei Yaxin	(Malaysia) Goh Soon Huat (Malaysia) Shevon Jemie Lai	21–17, 19–21, 21–17	(gold) Winner
2023	Korea Open	Super 500	(China) Wei Yaxin	(China) Feng Yanzhe (China) Huang Dongping	16–21, 13–21	(silver) Runner-up
2023	Arctic Open	Super 500	(China) Wei Yaxin	(China) Feng Yanzhe (China) Huang Dongping	14–21, 15–21	(silver) Runner-up
2023	French Open	Super 750	(China) Wei Yaxin	(Hong Kong) Tang Chun Man (Hong Kong) Tse Ying Suet	21–17, 15–21, 21–12	(gold) Winner
2023	Korea Masters	Super 300	(China) Wei Yaxin	(South Korea) Seo Seung-jae (South Korea) Chae Yoo-jung	14–21, 15–21	(silver) Runner-up
2024	India Open	Super 750	(China) Wei Yaxin	(Thailand) Dechapol Puavaranukroh (Thailand) Sapsiree Taerattanachai	16–21, 16–21	(silver) Runner-up
2024	Indonesia Open	Super 1000	(China) Wei Yaxin	(China) Zheng Siwei (China) Huang Yaqiong	21–11, 21–14	(gold) Winner
2024	Australian Open	Super 500	(China) Wei Yaxin	(China) Guo Xinwa (China) Chen Fanghui	21–12, 16–21, 21–12	(gold) Winner
2024	Japan Open	Super 750	(China) Wei Yaxin	(Hong Kong) Tang Chun Man (Hong Kong) Tse Ying Suet	21–12, 21–12	(gold) Winner
2024	Hong Kong Open	Super 500	(China) Wei Yaxin	(China) Feng Yanzhe (China) Huang Dongping	21–17, 21–19	(gold) Winner
2024	Arctic Open	Super 500	(China) Wei Yaxin	(China) Feng Yanzhe (China) Huang Dongping	18–21, 21–6, 15–21	(silver) Runner-up
2024	Denmark Open	Super 750	(China) Wei Yaxin	(China) Feng Yanzhe (China) Huang Dongping	21–15, 18–21, 17–21	(silver) Runner-up
2025	India Open	Super 750	(China) Wei Yaxin	(France) Thom Gicquel (France) Delphine Delrue	21–18, 21–17	(gold) Winner
2025	Malaysia Masters	Super 500	(China) Wei Yaxin	(China) Feng Yanzhe (China) Huang Dongping	17–21, 21–14, 16–21	(silver) Runner-up
2025	Japan Open	Super 750	(China) Wei Yaxin	(Thailand) Dechapol Puavaranukroh (Thailand) Supissara Paewsampran	21–19, 16–21, 21–15	(gold) Winner
2025	China Open	Super 1000	(China) Wei Yaxin	(China) Feng Yanzhe (China) Huang Dongping	21–23, 17–21	(silver) Runner-up
2025	Korea Open	Super 500	(China) Wei Yaxin	(China) Feng Yanzhe (China) Huang Dongping	23–25, 11–21	(silver) Runner-up
2025	Arctic Open	Super 500	(China) Wei Yaxin	(China) Feng Yanzhe (China) Huang Dongping	21–19, 24–22	(gold) Winner
2025	Denmark Open	Super 750	(China) Wei Yaxin	(China) Feng Yanzhe (China) Huang Dongping	13–21, 9–21	(silver) Runner-up
2025	BWF World Tour Finals	World Tour Finals	(China) Wei Yaxin	(China) Feng Yanzhe (China) Huang Dongping	12–21, 17–21	(silver) Runner-up
2026	Malaysia Open	Super 1000	(China) Wei Yaxin	(China) Feng Yanzhe (China) Huang Dongping	19–21, 19–21	(silver) Runner-up
2026	Macau Open	Super 300	(China) Wei Yaxin	(Hong Kong) Chan Yin Chak (Hong Kong) Ng Tsz Yau	21–14, 21–14	(gold) Winner
2026	Arctic Open	Super 500	(China) Wei Yaxin	(China) Gao Jiaxuan (China) Wu Mengying	21–18, 21–16	(gold) Winner
2026	Denmark Open	Super 750	(China) Wei Yaxin	(China) Feng Yanzhe (China) Huang Dongping	21–18, 8–21, 21–16	(gold) Winner
2026	Korea Open	Super 500	(China) Wei Yaxin	(China) Gao Jiaxuan (China) Wu Mengying	21–16, 21–13	(gold) Winner
2026	Japan Masters	Super 500	(China) Wei Yaxin	(China) Gao Jiaxuan (China) Wu Mengying	15–21, 21–15, 21–14	(gold) Winner
2026	Hong Kong Open	Super 500	(China) Wei Yaxin	(China) Feng Yanzhe (China) Huang Dongping	21–17, 9–21, 15–21	(silver) Runner-up

=== BWF International Challenge/Series (1 title, 2 runners-up) ===
Mixed doubles
Year	Tournament	Partner	Opponent	Score	Result
2022 (II)	Indonesia International	(China) Wei Yaxin	(Indonesia) Dejan Ferdinansyah (Indonesia) Gloria Emanuelle Widjaja	18–21, 20–22	(silver) Runner-up
2022	Vietnam International Series	(China) Wei Yaxin	(China) Cheng Xing (China) Chen Fanghui	21–14, 21–11	(gold) Winner
2022	Malaysia International	(China) Wei Yaxin	(China) Cheng Xing (China) Chen Fanghui	24–26, 18–21	(silver) Runner-up

BWF International Challenge tournament
BWF International Series tournament
BWF Future Series tournament

=== BWF Junior International (1 title, 2 runners-up) ===
Boys' doubles
Year	Tournament	Partner	Opponent	Score	Result	Ref.
2019	Polish Junior	(China) Guan Zicong	(China) Dai Enyi (China) Feng Yanzhe	18–21, 15–21	(silver) Runner-up	
2019	Swedish Junior	(China) Guan Zicong	(China) Dai Enyi (China) Feng Yanzhe	19–21, 20–22	(silver) Runner-up	

Mixed doubles
Year	Tournament	Partner	Opponent	Score	Result	Ref.
2019	German Junior	(China) Luo Xumin	(South Korea) Kim Joon-young (South Korea) Lee Eun-ji	21–15, 21–16	(gold) Winner	

BWF Junior International Grand Prix tournament
BWF Junior International Challenge tournament
BWF Junior International Series tournament
BWF Junior Future Series tournament
