= Feng Yanzhe =

Chinese badminton player

Feng Yanzhe 冯彦哲
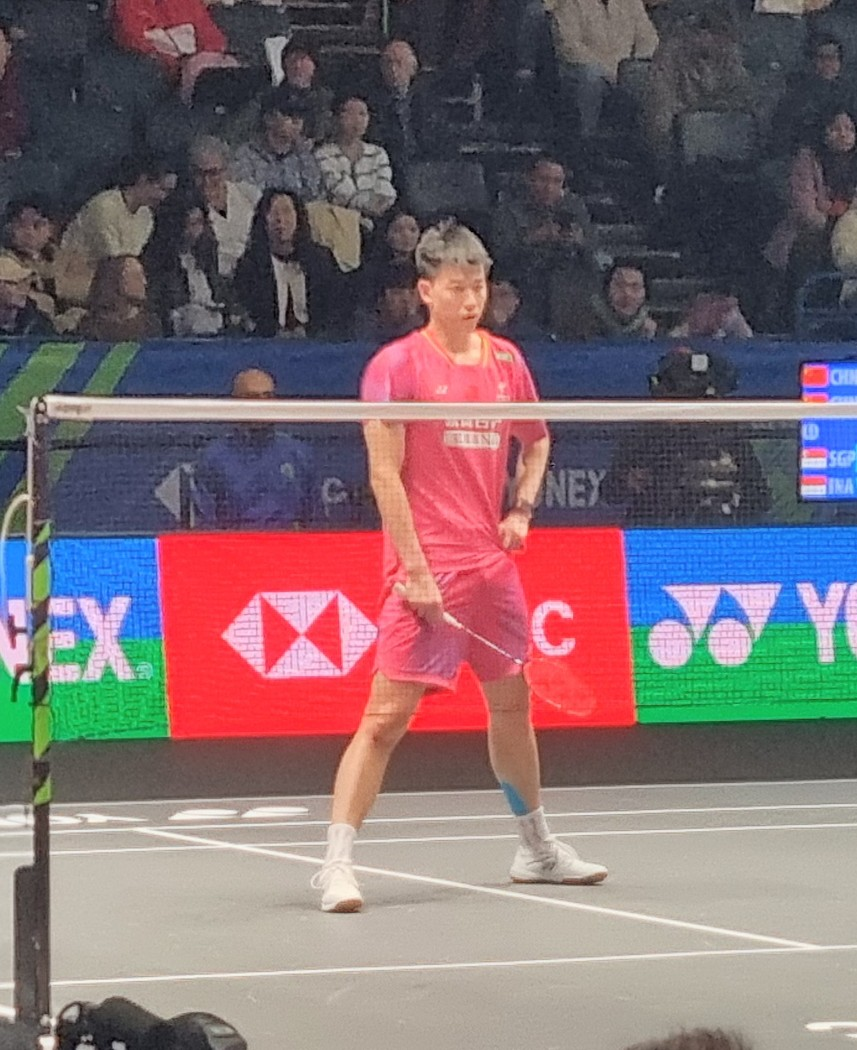

Personal information
- Born: 13 February 2001 (age 25) Tianjin, China
- Height: 1.95 m (6 ft 5 in)

Sport
- Country: China
- Sport: Badminton
- Handedness: Right

Mixed doubles
- Highest ranking: 1 (with Huang Dongping, 26 November 2024)
- Current ranking: 1 (with Huang Dongping, 6 October 2026)
- BWF profile
Medal record
Men's badminton
Representing China
World Championships
Silver medal – second place	2026 New Dehli	Mixed doubles
Sudirman Cup
Gold medal – first place	2021 Vantaa	Mixed team
Gold medal – first place	2023 Suzhou	Mixed team
Gold medal – first place	2025 Xiamen	Mixed team
Asian Games
Gold medal – first place	2022 Hangzhou	Men's team
Silver medal – second place	2026 Aichi–Nagoya	Men's team
Bronze medal – third place	2022 Hangzhou	Mixed doubles
Bronze medal – third place	2026 Aichi–Nagoya	Mixed doubles
Asian Championships
Gold medal – first place	2024 Ningbo	Mixed doubles
Bronze medal – third place	2026 Ningbo	Mixed doubles
Asia Mixed Team Championships
Gold medal – first place	2023 Dubai	Mixed team
World Junior Championships
Gold medal – first place	2018 Markham	Mixed team
Gold medal – first place	2019 Kazan	Mixed doubles
Silver medal – second place	2019 Kazan	Mixed team
Asian Junior Championships
Silver medal – second place	2019 Suzhou	Mixed doubles
Bronze medal – third place	2019 Suzhou	Boys' doubles
Bronze medal – third place	2019 Suzhou	Mixed team

Feng Yanzhe (simplified Chinese: 冯彦哲; traditional Chinese: 馮彥哲; pinyin: Féng Yànzhé; born 13 February 2001) is a Chinese badminton player. He is the current world number 1 in the mixed doubles with his partner Huang Dongping. They achieved this feat on 26 November 2024. Feng won the gold medal at the 2024 Asian Championships. His notability on the international stage began at a young age, where he emerge victorious in the mixed doubles at the 2019 World Junior Championships with Lin Fangling.

Feng was part of Chinese winning team in the 2018 World Junior Championships, 2021 and 2023 Sudirman Cup, 2022 Asian Games, and also at the 2023 Asia Mixed Team Championships.

== Career ==
Feng was born in Tianjin. He started playing badminton at the age of 5 and joined the Beijing team in 2009.

In October 2019, Feng played with the Chinese team in the World Junior Championships in Kazan, Russia, winning the silver medal in the mixed team event, and won the gold in the mixed doubles with partner Lin Fangling.

In October 2021, Feng helped the Chinese national team to win the Sudirman Cup.

== Achievements ==
=== BWF World Championships ===
Mixed doubles
Year	Venue	Partner	Opponent	Score	Result	Ref.
2026	Indira Gandhi Arena, New Delhi, India	(China) Huang Dongping	(France) Thom Gicquel (France) Delphine Delrue	20–22, 21–19, 15–21	Silver	

=== Asian Games ===
Mixed doubles
Year	Venue	Partner	Opponent	Score	Result	Ref.
2022	Binjiang Gymnasium, Hangzhou, China	(China) Huang Dongping	(Japan) Yuta Watanabe (Japan) Arisa Higashino	21–11, 20–22, 17–21	Bronze	
2026	Ichinomiya City Municipal Gymnasium, Ichinomiya, Japan	(China) Huang Dongping	(Indonesia) Amri Syahnawi (Indonesia) Nita Violina Marwah	12–21, 14–21	Bronze	

=== Asian Championships ===
Mixed doubles
Year	Venue	Partner	Opponent	Score	Result
2024	Ningbo Olympic Sports Center Gymnasium, Ningbo, China	(China) Huang Dongping	(South Korea) Seo Seung-jae (South Korea) Chae Yoo-jung	13–21, 21–15, 21–14	Gold
2026	Ningbo Olympic Sports Center Gymnasium, Ningbo, China	(China) Huang Dongping	(Thailand) Dechapol Puavaranukroh (Thailand) Supissara Paewsampran	19–21, 21–18, 20–22	Bronze

=== World Junior Championships ===
Mixed doubles
Year	Venue	Partner	Opponent	Score	Result
2019	Kazan Gymnastics Center, Kazan, Russia	(China) Lin Fangling	(Indonesia) Leo Rolly Carnando (Indonesia) Indah Cahya Sari Jamil	21–17, 21–17	Gold

=== Asian Junior Championships ===
Boys' doubles
Year	Venue	Partner	Opponent	Score	Result
2019	Suzhou Olympic Sports Centre, Suzhou, China	(China) Dai Enyi	(Indonesia) Leo Rolly Carnando (Indonesia) Daniel Marthin	13–21, 21–11, 15–21	Bronze

Mixed doubles
Year	Venue	Partner	Opponent	Score	Result
2019	Suzhou Olympic Sports Centre, Suzhou, China	(China) Lin Fangling	(Indonesia) Leo Rolly Carnando (Indonesia) Indah Cahya Sari Jamil	21–16, 20–22, 20–22	Silver

=== BWF World Tour (27 titles, 11 runners-up) ===
The BWF World Tour, which was announced on 19 March 2017 and implemented in 2018, is a series of elite badminton tournaments sanctioned by the Badminton World Federation (BWF). The BWF World Tour is divided into levels of World Tour Finals, Super 1000, Super 750, Super 500, Super 300, and the BWF Tour Super 100.

Mixed doubles
Year	Tournament	Level	Partner	Opponent	Score	Result
2022	Denmark Open	Super 750	(China) Huang Dongping	(China) Zheng Siwei (China) Huang Yaqiong	19–21, 22–20, 19–21	(silver) Runner-up
2022	Hylo Open	Super 300	(China) Huang Dongping	(Indonesia) Rehan Naufal Kusharjanto (Indonesia) Lisa Ayu Kusumawati	17–21, 15–21	(silver) Runner-up
2023	Indonesia Masters	Super 500	(China) Huang Dongping	(China) Jiang Zhenbang (China) Wei Yaxin	21–15, 16–21, 21–19	(gold) Winner
2023	Thailand Masters	Super 300	(China) Huang Dongping	(South Korea) Seo Seung-jae (South Korea) Chae Yoo-jung	18–21, 21–15, 21–12	(gold) Winner
2023	German Open	Super 300	(China) Huang Dongping	(South Korea) Kim Won-ho (South Korea) Jeong Na-eun	21–4, 21–15	(gold) Winner
2023	Malaysia Masters	Super 500	(China) Huang Dongping	(Thailand) Dechapol Puavaranukroh (Thailand) Sapsiree Taerattanachai	21–16, 13–21, 18–21	(silver) Runner-up
2023	Korea Open	Super 500	(China) Huang Dongping	(China) Jiang Zhenbang (China) Wei Yaxin	21–16, 21–13	(gold) Winner
2023	Australian Open	Super 500	(China) Huang Dongping	(Japan) Hiroki Midorikawa (Japan) Natsu Saito	21–14, 16–21, 21–15	(gold) Winner
2023	Arctic Open	Super 500	(China) Huang Dongping	(China) Jiang Zhenbang (China) Wei Yaxin	21–14, 21–15	(gold) Winner
2023	Denmark Open	Super 750	(China) Huang Dongping	(China) Zheng Siwei (China) Huang Yaqiong	16–21, 21–15, 26–24	(gold) Winner
2023	Japan Masters	Super 500	(China) Huang Dongping	(China) Zheng Siwei (China) Huang Yaqiong	23–25, 9–21	(silver) Runner-up
2023	BWF World Tour Finals	World Tour Finals	(China) Huang Dongping	(China) Zheng Siwei (China) Huang Yaqiong	11–21, 18–21	(silver) Runner-up
2024	French Open	Super 750	(China) Huang Dongping	(South Korea) Seo Seung-jae (South Korea) Chae Yoo-jung	21–16, 21–16	(gold) Winner
2024	Hong Kong Open	Super 500	(China) Huang Dongping	(China) Jiang Zhenbang (China) Wei Yaxin	17–21, 19–21	(silver) Runner-up
2024	China Open	Super 1000	(China) Huang Dongping	(Malaysia) Goh Soon Huat (Malaysia) Shevon Jemie Lai	16–21, 21–14, 21–17	(gold) Winner
2024	Arctic Open	Super 500	(China) Huang Dongping	(China) Jiang Zhenbang (China) Wei Yaxin	21–18, 6–21, 21–15	(gold) Winner
2024	Denmark Open	Super 750	(China) Huang Dongping	(China) Jiang Zhenbang (China) Wei Yaxin	15–21, 21–18, 21–17	(gold) Winner
2024	China Masters	Super 750	(China) Huang Dongping	(Malaysia) Hoo Pang Ron (Malaysia) Cheng Su Yin	21–23, 25–23, 21–16	(gold) Winner
2025	Malaysia Open	Super 1000	(China) Huang Dongping	(Thailand) Dechapol Puavaranukroh (Thailand) Supissara Paewsampran	13–21, 21–19, 18–21	(silver) Runner-up
2025	All England Open	Super 1000	(China) Wei Yaxin	(China) Guo Xinwa (China) Chen Fanghui	16–21, 21–10, 21–23	(silver) Runner-up
2025	Swiss Open	Super 300	(China) Wei Yaxin	(China) Zhu Yijun (China) Zhang Chi	21–13, 21–15	(gold) Winner
2025	Thailand Open	Super 500	(China) Huang Dongping	(China) Gao Jiaxuan (China) Wu Mengying	24–22, 21–16	(gold) Winner
2025	Malaysia Masters	Super 500	(China) Huang Dongping	(China) Jiang Zhenbang (China) Wei Yaxin	21–17, 14–21, 21–16	(gold) Winner
2025	China Open	Super 1000	(China) Huang Dongping	(China) Jiang Zhenbang (China) Wei Yaxin	23–21, 21–17	(gold) Winner
2025	Hong Kong Open	Super 500	(China) Huang Dongping	(China) Guo Xinwa (China) Chen Fanghui	21–14, 21–14	(gold) Winner
2025	Korea Open	Super 500	(China) Huang Dongping	(China) Jiang Zhenbang (China) Wei Yaxin	25–23, 21–11	(gold) Winner
2025	Arctic Open	Super 500	(China) Huang Dongping	(China) Jiang Zhenbang (China) Wei Yaxin	19–21, 22–24	(silver) Runner-up
2025	Denmark Open	Super 750	(China) Huang Dongping	(China) Jiang Zhenbang (China) Wei Yaxin	21–13, 21–9	(gold) Winner
2025	French Open	Super 750	(China) Huang Dongping	(Thailand) Dechapol Puavaranukroh (Thailand) Supissara Paewsampran	27–25, 21–12	(gold) Winner
2025	BWF World Tour Finals	World Tour Finals	(China) Huang Dongping	(China) Jiang Zhenbang (China) Wei Yaxin	21–12, 21–17	(gold) Winner
2026	Malaysia Open	Super 1000	(China) Huang Dongping	(China) Jiang Zhenbang (China) Wei Yaxin	21–19, 21–19	(gold) Winner
2026	Australian Open	Super 500	(China) Huang Dongping	(China) Guo Xinwa (China) Chen Fanghui	21–17, 21–19	(gold) Winner
2026	Japan Open	Super 750	(China) Huang Dongping	(Hong Kong) Tang Chun Man (Hong Kong) Tse Ying Suet	21–14, 14–21, 21–15	(gold) Winner
2026	China Open	Super 1000	(China) Huang Dongping	(China) Guo Xinwa (China) Chen Fanghui	23–25, 22–20, 15–21	(silver) Runner-up
2026	China Masters	Super 750	(China) Huang Dongping	(Malaysia) Hoo Pang Ron (Malaysia) Lai Pei Jing	21–19, 21–16	(gold) Winner
2026	Denmark Open	Super 750	(China) Huang Dongping	(China) Jiang Zhenbang (China) Wei Yaxin	18–21, 21–8, 16–21	(silver) Runner-up
2026	French Open	Super 750	(China) Huang Dongping	(Malaysia) Hoo Pang Ron (Malaysia) Lai Pei Jing	21–10, 21–13	(gold) Winner
2026	Hong Kong Open	Super 500	(China) Huang Dongping	(China) Jiang Zhenbang (China) Wei Yaxin	17–21, 21–9, 21–15	(gold) Winner
