= Zhang Chi (badminton) =

Chinese badminton player (born 2002)

Zhang Chi 张驰
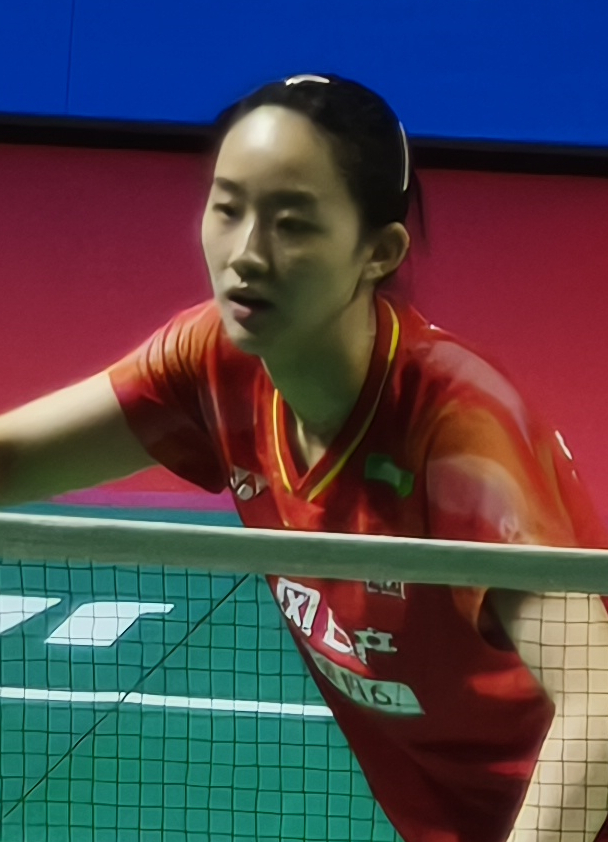
- Zhang at the 2026 Indonesia Open

Personal information
- Born: 27 April 2002 (age 24) Hunan, China
- Height: 1.71 m (5 ft 7 in)

Sport
- Country: China
- Sport: Badminton
- Handedness: Right

Women's & mixed doubles
- Highest ranking: 34 (WD with Keng Shuliang, 12 November 2024); 7 (XD with Cheng Xing, 8 September 2026)
- Current ranking: 7 (XD with Cheng Xing, 17 November 2026)
- BWF profile
Medal record
Women's badminton
Representing China
World Junior Championships
| Silver medal – second place | 2019 Kazan | Mixed team |
Asian Junior Championships
| Silver medal – second place | 2019 Suzhou | Girls' doubles |
| Bronze medal – third place | 2019 Suzhou | Mixed doubles |
| Bronze medal – third place | 2019 Suzhou | Mixed team |

Zhang Chi (simplified Chinese: 张驰; traditional Chinese: 張馳; pinyin: Zhāng Chí; born 27 April 2002) is a Chinese badminton player. She won her first international title at the 2024 Orléans Masters.

== Personal life ==
She is a student at Central South University.

== Achievements ==
=== Asian Junior Championships ===
Girls' doubles
| Year | Venue | Partner | Opponent | Score | Result |
|---|---|---|---|---|---|
| 2019 | Suzhou Olympic Sports Centre; Suzhou, China | (China) Chen Yingxue | (China) Li Yijing (China) Luo Xumin | 17–21, 17–21 | Silver |

Mixed doubles
| Year | Venue | Partner | Opponent | Score | Result |
|---|---|---|---|---|---|
| 2019 | Suzhou Olympic Sports Centre, Suzhou, China | (China) Chen Xujun | (China) Feng Yanzhe (China) Lin Fangling | 8–21, 13–21 | Bronze |

=== BWF World Tour (3 titles, 4 runners-up) ===
The BWF World Tour, which was announced on 19 March 2017 and implemented in 2018, is a series of elite badminton tournaments sanctioned by the Badminton World Federation (BWF). The BWF World Tours are divided into levels of World Tour Finals, Super 1000, Super 750, Super 500, Super 300, and the BWF Tour Super 100.

Women's doubles
| Year | Tournament | Level | Partner | Opponent | Score | Result |
|---|---|---|---|---|---|---|
| 2023 | Ruichang China Masters | Super 100 | (China) Keng Shuliang | (China) Chen Xiaofei (China) Feng Xueying | 15–21, 19–21 | (silver) Runner-up |

Mixed doubles
| Year | Tournament | Level | Partner | Opponent | Score | Result |
|---|---|---|---|---|---|---|
| 2024 | Orléans Masters | Super 300 | (China) Cheng Xing | (Indonesia) Rinov Rivaldy (Indonesia) Pitha Haningtyas Mentari | 16–21, 21–18, 21–15 | (gold) Winner |
| 2024 | Spain Masters | Super 300 | (China) Cheng Xing | (Indonesia) Rinov Rivaldy (Indonesia) Pitha Haningtyas Mentari | 21–17, 12–21, 13–21 | (silver) Runner-up |
| 2025 | Swiss Open | Super 300 | (China) Zhu Yijun | (China) Feng Yanzhe (China) Wei Yaxin | 13–21, 15–21 | (silver) Runner-up |
| 2026 | German Open | Super 300 | (China) Cheng Xing | (Denmark) Mads Vestergaard (Denmark) Christine Busch | 21–12, 21–17 | (gold) Winner |
| 2026 | Swiss Open | Super 300 | (China) Cheng Xing | (China) Zhu Yijun (China) Li Qian | 20–22, 21–15, 22–20 | (gold) Winner |
| 2026 | Indonesia Open | Super 1000 | (China) Cheng Xing | (Denmark) Mathias Christiansen (Denmark) Alexandra Bøje | 19–21, 21–23 | (silver) Runner-up |

=== BWF International Challenge/Series (1 runner-up) ===
Women's doubles
| Year | Tournament | Partner | Opponent | Score | Result |
|---|---|---|---|---|---|
| 2023 | China International | (China) Keng Shuliang | (China) Xia Yuting (China) Zhou Xinru | 13–21, 15–21 | (silver) Runner-up |

BWF International Challenge tournament
BWF International Series tournament
BWF Future Series tournament
