= 2024 Korea Masters =

Badminton tournament in Korea

Tournament details
- Dates: 5–10 November
- Edition: 16th
- Level: Super 300
- Total prize money: US$210,000
- Venue: Iksan Gymnasium
- Location: Iksan, South Korea

Champions
- Men's singles: (Thailand) Kunlavut Vitidsarn
- Women's singles: (Indonesia) Putri Kusuma Wardani
- Men's doubles: (Malaysia) Aaron Chia (Malaysia) Soh Wooi Yik
- Women's doubles: (South Korea) Kim Hye-jeong (South Korea) Kong Hee-yong
- Mixed doubles: (China) Guo Xinwa (China) Chen Fanghui

The 2024 Korea Masters was a badminton tournament which took place at Iksan Gymnasium in Iksan, South Korea, from 5 to 10 November 2024 and had a total prize of $210,000.

== Tournament ==
The 2024 Korea Masters was the thirty-fourth tournament of the 2024 BWF World Tour and also part of the Korea Masters championships, which have been held since 2007. This tournament was organized by the Badminton Korea Association with sanction from the BWF.

=== Venue ===
This tournament was held at Iksan Gymnasium in Iksan, South Korea.

=== Point distribution ===
Below is the point distribution table for each phase of the tournament based on the BWF points system for the BWF World Tour Super 300 event.

Winner	Runner-up	3/4	5/8	9/16	17/32	33/64	65/128
7,000	5,950	4,900	3,850	2,750	1,670	660	320

=== Prize pool ===
The total prize money was US$210,000 with the distribution of the prize money in accordance with BWF regulations.

Event	Winner	Finalist	Semi-finals	Quarter-finals	Last 16
Singles	$15,700	$7,980	$3,045	$1,260	$735
Doubles	$16,590	$7,980	$2,940	$1,522.5	$787.5

== Men's singles ==
=== Seeds ===
1. (Thailand) Kunlavut Vitidsarn (champion)
2. (Chinese Taipei) Lee Chia-hao (second round)
3. (Chinese Taipei) Chi Yu-jen (second round)
4. (Chinese Taipei) Su Li-yang (second round)
5. (Japan) Takuma Obayashi (quarter-finals)
6. (South Korea) Jeon Hyeok-jin (second round)
7. (Singapore) Jason Teh (first round)
8. (Thailand) Kantaphon Wangcharoen (second round)

=== Finals ===
Semi-finals
1	(Thailand) Kunlavut Vitidsarn	21	22
(India) Kiran George	12	20
(China) Wang Zhengxing	9	21	21
(South Korea) Cho Geon-yeop	21	15	10

Final
1	(Thailand) Kunlavut Vitidsarn	21	21
(China) Wang Zhengxing	18	18

=== Top half ===
==== Section 1 ====
First round
1	(Thailand) K Vitidsarn	21	17	21
Q2	(South Korea) Jeong M-s	16	21	7
(Thailand) P Teeraratsakul	21	21
PFQ	(United States) E Asuncion	14	14
7	(Singapore) J Teh	21	7	18
(China) Liu L	16	21	21
PFQ	(South Korea) Lee Y-g	21	21	21
(Chinese Taipei) Huang P-h	7	23	23

Second round
1	(Thailand) K Vitidsarn	21	21
(Thailand) P Teeraratsakul	5	10
(China) Liu L	21	21
(Chinese Taipei) Huang P-h	14	14

Quarter-finals
1	(Thailand) K Vitidsarn	21	21
(China) Liu L	15	11

==== Section 2 ====
First round
3	(Chinese Taipei) Chi Y-j	21	21
Q3	(South Korea) Park S-y	14	18
(Vietnam) Nguyễn H Đ	21	12	15
(India) K George	15	21	21
5	(Japan) T Obayashi	21	19	21
(Chinese Taipei) Liao J-f	18	21	13
(Malaysia) Kok J H	21	21
Q4	(South Korea) Do D-w	12	18

Second round
3	(Chinese Taipei) Chi Y-j	17	21	17
(India) K George	21	19	21
5	(Japan) T Obayashi	22	21
(Malaysia) Kok J H	20	14

Quarter-finals
(India) K George	21	21
5	(Japan) T Obayashi	14	16

=== Bottom half ===
==== Section 3 ====
First round
(China) Wang ZX	21	21
(Chinese Taipei) Kuo K-l	15	11
(Malaysia) J Hoh	18	17
8	(Thailand) K Wangcharoen	21	21
Q1	(China) Zhu XC	26	12	19
(Japan) R Hatano	24	21	21
(Japan) K Takahashi	21	21	16
4	(Chinese Taipei) Su L-y	14	23	21

Second round
(China) Wang ZX	22	21
8	(Thailand) K Wangcharoen	20	8
(Japan) R Hatano	21	19	21
4	(Chinese Taipei) Su L-y	13	21	15

Quarter-finals
(China) Wang ZX	21	21
(Japan) R Hatano	14	18

==== Section 4 ====
First round
(Chinese Taipei) Huang Y-k	11	6
(Hong Kong) J Gunawan	21	21
(Canada) XD Sheng	14	7
6	(South Korea) Jeon H-j	21	21
(South Korea) Cho G-y	21	19	21
(Chinese Taipei) Wang P-w	8	21	19
(Hong Kong) Chan Y C	21	18	19
2	(Chinese Taipei) Lee C-h	12	21	21

Second round
(Hong Kong) J Gunawan	21	21
6	(South Korea) Jeon H-j	19	19
(South Korea) Cho G-y	21	23
2	(Chinese Taipei) Lee C-h	11	21

Quarter-finals
(Hong Kong) J Gunawan	21	18	17
(South Korea) Cho G-y	18	21	21

== Women's singles ==
=== Seeds ===
1. (Japan) Tomoka Miyazaki (semi-finals)
2. (Indonesia) Putri Kusuma Wardani (champion)
3. (Chinese Taipei) Pai Yu-po (first round)
4. (Vietnam) Nguyễn Thùy Linh (first round)
5. (Chinese Taipei) Chiu Pin-chian (semi-finals)
6. (South Korea) Sim Yu-jin (quarter-finals)
7. (Chinese Taipei) Lin Hsiang-ti (quarter-finals)
8. (Japan) Riko Gunji (withdrew)

=== Finals ===
Semi-finals
1	(Japan) Tomoka Miyazaki	18	8
(China) Han Qianxi	21	21
5	(Chinese Taipei) Chiu Pin-chian	13	13
2	(Indonesia) Putri Kusuma Wardani	21	21

Final
(China) Han Qianxi	14	14
2	(Indonesia) Putri Kusuma Wardani	21	21

=== Top half ===
==== Section 1 ====
First round
1	(Japan) T Miyazaki	21	21
(Chinese Taipei) Chen S-y	17	15
Q2	(South Korea) Kim S-m	12	9
(Thailand) P Opatniputh	21	21
7	(Chinese Taipei) Lin H-t	21	21
(Thailand) N Rattanapanuwong	6	9
(South Korea) Kim G-r	21	21
(Japan) M Suizu	11	16

Second round
1	(Japan) T Miyazaki	18	21	21
(Thailand) P Opatniputh	21	16	10
7	(Chinese Taipei) Lin H-t	21	21
(South Korea) Kim G-r	19	17

Quarter-finals
1	(Japan) T Miyazaki	21	21
7	(Chinese Taipei) Lin H-t	18	10

==== Section 2 ====
First round
3	(Chinese Taipei) Pai Y-p
(Poland) W Dąbczyńska	w	/	o
PFQ	(South Korea) Yoo S-y	8	16
(China) Han QX	21	21
SWM	(Indonesia) K A C Dewi	21	19	21
(Chinese Taipei) Liang T-y	13	21	23
(Chinese Taipei) Hung Y-t	21	16	21
PFQ	(South Korea) Lee S-yu	12	21	23

Second round
(Poland) W Dąbczyńska	13	6
(China) Han QX	21	21
(Chinese Taipei) Liang T-y	17	22
PFQ	(South Korea) Lee S-yu	21	24

Quarter-finals
(China) Han QX	21	21
PFQ	(South Korea) Lee S-yu	19	13

=== Bottom half ===
==== Section 3 ====
First round
(Japan) A Kurihara	21	21
(United States) I Rusli	7	8
(South Korea) Kim J-e	13	12
5	(Chinese Taipei) Chiu P-c	21	21
Q1	(South Korea) Lee S-ye	18^{r}
(Belgium) C Lassaux	21
PFQ	(South Korea) Kim M-s	20	21	21
4	(Vietnam) Nguyễn T L	22	17	12

Second round
(Japan) A Kurihara	8	21	15
5	(Chinese Taipei) Chiu P-c	21	19	21
(Belgium) C Lassaux	16	14
PFQ	(South Korea) Kim M-s	21	21

Quarter-finals
5	(Chinese Taipei) Chiu P-c	15	21	21
PFQ	(South Korea) Kim M-s	21	15	19

==== Section 4 ====
First round
Q4	(South Korea) Yoo A-y	18	15
(South Korea) Park G-e	21	21
(Japan) H Akechi	24	11	19
6	(South Korea) Sim Y-j	22	21	21
Q3	(South Korea) Park M-k	5^{r}
(Chinese Taipei) Tung C-t	11
(Chinese Taipei) Huang Y-h	4	9
2	(Indonesia) P K Wardani	21	21

Second round
(South Korea) Park G-e	11	13
6	(South Korea) Sim Y-j	21	21
(Chinese Taipei) Tung C-t	15	12
2	(Indonesia) P K Wardani	21	21

Quarter-finals
6	(South Korea) Sim Y-j	16	21	22
2	(Indonesia) P K Wardani	21	12	24

== Men's doubles ==
=== Seeds ===
1. (Malaysia) Aaron Chia / Soh Wooi Yik (champions)
2. (Chinese Taipei) Lee Jhe-huei / Yang Po-hsuan (quarter-finals)
3. (Indonesia) Sabar Karyaman Gutama / Muhammad Reza Pahlevi Isfahani (second round)
4. (China) Chen Boyang / Liu Yi (second round)
5. (Indonesia) Muhammad Shohibul Fikri / Daniel Marthin (second round)
6. (Malaysia) Choong Hon Jian / Muhammad Haikal (first round)
7. (South Korea) Ki Dong-ju / Seo Seung-jae (semi-finals)
8. (Chinese Taipei) Lee Fang-chih / Lee Fang-jen (first round)

=== Finals ===
Semi-finals
1	(Malaysia) Aaron Chia (Malaysia) Soh Wooi Yik	21	21
(Chinese Taipei) Chiu Hsiang-chieh (Chinese Taipei) Wang Chi-lin	17	16
7	(South Korea) Ki Dong-ju (South Korea) Seo Seung-jae	21	19	16
(South Korea) Jin Yong (South Korea) Kim Won-ho	16	21	21

Final
1	(Malaysia) Aaron Chia (Malaysia) Soh Wooi Yik	21	21	21
(South Korea) Jin Yong (South Korea) Kim Won-ho	23	19	14

=== Top half ===
==== Section 1 ====
First round
1	(Malaysia) A Chia (Malaysia) Soh W Y	12	21	21
(Chinese Taipei) Chiang C-w (Chinese Taipei) Wei C-w	21	18	17
(Chinese Taipei) Wu H-y (Chinese Taipei) Ye H-w	16	19
Q1	(South Korea) Ko S-h (South Korea) Shin B-c	21	21
6	(Malaysia) Choong H J (Malaysia) M Haikal	11	21	17
(Chinese Taipei) Lu C (Chinese Taipei) Po L-w	21	10	21
(Chinese Taipei) Chen C-k (Chinese Taipei) Chen S-f	19	16
(South Korea) Kim J-h (South Korea) Lee S-w	21	21

Second round
1	(Malaysia) A Chia (Malaysia) Soh W Y	21	21
Q1	(South Korea) Ko S-h (South Korea) Shin B-c	18	17
(Chinese Taipei) Lu C (Chinese Taipei) Po L-w	14	21
(South Korea) Kim J-h (South Korea) Lee S-w	21	23

Quarter-finals
1	(Malaysia) A Chia (Malaysia) Soh W Y	21	21
(South Korea) Kim J-h (South Korea) Lee S-w	17	12

==== Section 2 ====
First round
4	(China) Chen BY (China) Liu Y	21	22
Q2	(South Korea) Lee J-m (South Korea) Noh J-s	15	20
Q4	(Vietnam) Nguyễn Đ H (Vietnam) Trần Đ M	19	20
(Chinese Taipei) Chiu H-c (Chinese Taipei) Wang C-l	21	22
8	(Chinese Taipei) Lee F-c (Chinese Taipei) Lee F-j	21	24	18
(China) Xie HN (China) Zeng WH	14	26	21
(United States) Chen Z-y (United States) P Smith	17	21	12
(South Korea) Choi S-g (South Korea) Heo K-h	21	18	21

Second round
4	(China) Chen BY (China) Liu Y	15	16
(Chinese Taipei) Chiu H-c (Chinese Taipei) Wang C-l	21	21
(China) Xie HN (China) Zeng WH	9	21	21
(South Korea) Choi S-g (South Korea) Heo K-h	21	19	18

Quarter-finals
(Chinese Taipei) Chiu H-c (Chinese Taipei) Wang C-l	21	16	21
(China) Xie HN (China) Zeng WH	12	21	19

=== Bottom half ===
==== Section 3 ====
First round
(South Korea) Na S-s (South Korea) Shin T-y	17	22	21
(Malaysia) Boon X Y (Malaysia) Goh V S	21	20	11
(Chinese Taipei) Chang K-c (Chinese Taipei) Chen X-y	13	19
7	(South Korea) Ki D-j (South Korea) Seo S-j	21	21
(Chinese Taipei) Lu M-c (Chinese Taipei) Tang K-w	21	21
(Thailand) P Thongkham (Thailand) W Thongkham	14	14
(Chinese Taipei) Chen Z-r (Chinese Taipei) Lin Y-c	18	21	19
3	(Indonesia) S K Gutama (Indonesia) M R P Isfahani	21	10	21

Second round
(South Korea) Na S-s (South Korea) Shin T-y	18	21	13
7	(South Korea) Ki D-j (South Korea) Seo S-j	21	17	21
(Chinese Taipei) Lu M-c (Chinese Taipei) Tang K-w	22	21
3	(Indonesia) S K Gutama (Indonesia) M R P Isfahani	20	16

Quarter-finals
7	(South Korea) Ki D-j (South Korea) Seo S-j	21	21
(Chinese Taipei) Lu M-c (Chinese Taipei) Tang K-w	17	16

==== Section 4 ====
First round
(South Korea) Jin Y (South Korea) Kim W-h	21	21
(Chinese Taipei) Lu C-y (Chinese Taipei) Wu G-x	18	8
(Malaysia) Kang K X (Malaysia) A Tai	20	17
5	(Indonesia) M S Fikri (Indonesia) D Marthin	22	21
Q3	(South Korea) Cho S-h (South Korea) Jin S-i	21	18	19
(Malaysia) Low H Y (Malaysia) Ng E C	17	21	21
(Malaysia) N M Azriyn A (Malaysia) Tan W K	21	18	15
2	(Chinese Taipei) Lee J-h (Chinese Taipei) Yang P-h	15	21	21

Second round
(South Korea) Jin Y (South Korea) Kim W-h	11	21	21
5	(Indonesia) M S Fikri (Indonesia) D Marthin	21	10	16
(Malaysia) Low H Y (Malaysia) Ng E C	17	21	17
2	(Chinese Taipei) Lee J-h (Chinese Taipei) Yang P-h	21	19	21

Quarter-finals
(South Korea) Jin Y (South Korea) Kim W-h	21	21
2	(Chinese Taipei) Lee J-h (Chinese Taipei) Yang P-h	19	11

== Women's doubles ==
=== Seeds ===
1. (South Korea) Baek Ha-na / Lee So-hee (second round)
2. (China) Li Yijing / Luo Xumin (final)
3. (Indonesia) Febriana Dwipuji Kusuma / Amallia Cahaya Pratiwi (semi-finals)
4. (Chinese Taipei) Chang Ching-hui / Yang Ching-tun (second round)
5. (China) Jia Yifan / Zhang Shuxian (withdrew)
6. (South Korea) Kim Hye-jeong / Kong Hee-yong (champions)
7. (South Korea) Jeong Na-eun / Shin Seung-chan (quarter-finals)
8. (Chinese Taipei) Hsu Yin-hui / Lin Jhih-yun (second round)

=== Finals ===
Semi-finals
6	(South Korea) Kim Hye-jeong (South Korea) Kong Hee-yong	21	19	21
(South Korea) Kim Bo-ryeong (South Korea) Kim So-yeong	15	21	11
3	(Indonesia) Febriana Dwipuji Kusuma (Indonesia) Amallia Cahaya Pratiwi	10	11
2	(China) Li Yijing (China) Luo Xumin	21	21

Final
6	(South Korea) Kim Hye-jeong (South Korea) Kong Hee-yong	21	16	21
2	(China) Li Yijing (China) Luo Xumin	14	21	18

=== Top half ===
==== Section 1 ====
First round
(Chinese Taipei) Tsai R-l (Chinese Taipei) Wang Y-z	8	11
(Chinese Taipei) Hsu Y-c (Chinese Taipei) Sung Y-h	21	21
(Chinese Taipei) Lin W-c (Chinese Taipei) Liu C-y	15	12
(South Korea) Lee Y-w (South Korea) Lee Y-l	21	21

Second round
1	(South Korea) Baek H-n (South Korea) Lee S-h
(Chinese Taipei) Hsu Y-c (Chinese Taipei) Sung Y-h	w	/	o
6	(South Korea) Kim H-j (South Korea) Kong H-y	21	21
(South Korea) Lee Y-w (South Korea) Lee Y-l	14	14

Quarter-finals
(Chinese Taipei) Hsu Y-c (Chinese Taipei) Sung Y-h	19	11
6	(South Korea) Kim H-j (South Korea) Kong H-y	21	21

==== Section 2 ====
First round
(South Korea) Kim M-j (South Korea) Park S	16	12
(South Korea) Kim B-r (South Korea) Kim S-y	21	21
7	(South Korea) Jeong N-e (South Korea) Shin S-c	21	19	21
(Australia) G Somerville (Australia) A Yu	9	21	10
(Chinese Taipei) Chiu P-c (Chinese Taipei) Tung C-t	7
(South Korea) Jang E-s (South Korea) Lee S-j	3^{r}

Second round
4	(Chinese Taipei) Chang C-h (Chinese Taipei) Yang C-t	20	13
(South Korea) Kim B-r (South Korea) Kim S-y	22	21
7	(South Korea) Jeong N-e (South Korea) Shin S-c	21	21
(Chinese Taipei) Chiu P-c (Chinese Taipei) Tung C-t	7	14

Quarter-finals
(South Korea) Kim B-r (South Korea) Kim S-y	21	21
7	(South Korea) Jeong N-e (South Korea) Shin S-c	16	15

=== Bottom half ===
==== Section 3 ====
First round
(Chinese Taipei) Lin X-m (Chinese Taipei) Wang Y-q	21	21
(France) M Lambert (France) C Pognante	17	12
(Chinese Taipei) Hu L-f (Chinese Taipei) Jheng Y-c	21	21
SWM	(Indonesia) J P Miantoro (Indonesia) F Setianingrum	14	12
(Chinese Taipei) Jiang Y-h (Chinese Taipei) Li Z-q	21	12	21
(China) Keng SL (China) Li WM	12	21	15
(Chinese Taipei) Hsieh P-s (Chinese Taipei) Hung E-t	17	24	15
3	(Indonesia) F D Kusuma (Indonesia) A C Pratiwi	21	22	21

Second round
(Chinese Taipei) Lin X-m (Chinese Taipei) Wang Y-q	14	21	21
(Chinese Taipei) Hu L-f (Chinese Taipei) Jheng Y-c	21	16	17
(Chinese Taipei) Jiang Y-h (Chinese Taipei) Li Z-q	9	10
3	(Indonesia) F D Kusuma (Indonesia) A C Pratiwi	21	21

Quarter-finals
(Chinese Taipei) Lin X-m (Chinese Taipei) Wang Y-q	16	21	11
3	(Indonesia) F D Kusuma (Indonesia) A C Pratiwi	21	17	21

==== Section 4 ====
First round
(Chinese Taipei) Chen Y-f (Chinese Taipei) Sun L-c	w	/	o
(Chinese Taipei) N G Chan (Chinese Taipei) Yang C-y
(Sweden) M Sjöö (Sweden) T Sjöö	16	19
8	(Chinese Taipei) Hsu Y-h (Chinese Taipei) Lin J-y	21	21
(South Korea) Jang M-y (South Korea) Kim M-s	21	21
(Chinese Taipei) Lee C-c (Chinese Taipei) Lin Y-y	12	13

Second round
(Chinese Taipei) Chen Y-f (Chinese Taipei) Sun L-c	10	21	23
8	(Chinese Taipei) Hsu Y-h (Chinese Taipei) Lin J-y	21	17	21
(South Korea) Jang M-y (South Korea) Kim M-s	12	12
2	(China) Li YJ (China) Luo XM	21	21

Quarter-finals
(Chinese Taipei) Chen Y-f (Chinese Taipei) Sun L-c	17	12
2	(China) Li YJ (China) Luo XM	21	21

== Mixed doubles ==
=== Seeds ===
1. (China) Cheng Xing / Zhang Chi (semi-finals)
2. (Indonesia) Dejan Ferdinansyah / Gloria Emanuelle Widjaja (final)
3. (Chinese Taipei) Yang Po-hsuan / Hu Ling-fang (second round)
4. (China) Guo Xinwa / Chen Fanghui (champions)
5. (Thailand) Ruttanapak Oupthong / Jhenicha Sudjaipraparat (quarter-finals)
6. (Chinese Taipei) Ye Hong-wei / Nicole Gonzales Chan (withdrew)
7. (Chinese Taipei) Chen Cheng-kuan / Hsu Yin-hui (quarter-finals)
8. (Chinese Taipei) Wu Hsuan-yi / Yang Chu-yun (second round)

=== Finals ===
Semi-finals
1	(China) Cheng Xing (China) Zhang Chi	21	14	21
4	(China) Guo Xinwa (China) Chen Fanghui	16	21	23
(South Korea) Ko Sung-hyun (South Korea) Eom Hye-won	18	7
2	(Indonesia) Dejan Ferdinansyah (Indonesia) Gloria Emanuelle Widjaja	21	21

Final
4	(China) Guo Xinwa (China) Chen Fanghui	21	21
2	(Indonesia) Dejan Ferdinansyah (Indonesia) Gloria Emanuelle Widjaja	10	12

=== Top half ===
==== Section 1 ====
First round
(France) G Deschamp (France) M Lambert	15	21	16
(Chinese Taipei) He Z-w (Chinese Taipei) Chen Y-f	21	17	21
(Chinese Taipei) Lu C (Chinese Taipei) Lin J-y	9	17
(South Korea) Lee J-m (South Korea) Lee Y-l	21	21

Second round
1	(China) Cheng X (China) Zhang C	21	21
(Chinese Taipei) He Z-w (Chinese Taipei) Chen Y-f	14	16
8	(Chinese Taipei) Wu H-y (Chinese Taipei) Yang C-y	18	21
(South Korea) Lee J-m (South Korea) Lee Y-l	21	23

Quarter-finals
1	(China) Cheng X (China) Zhang C	21	21
(South Korea) Lee J-m (South Korea) Lee Y-l	17	10

==== Section 2 ====
First round
4	(China) Guo XW (China) Chen FH	21	21
(Chinese Taipei) Chang K-c (Chinese Taipei) Lin Y-y	10	10
(South Korea) Park K-h (South Korea) Kim Y-j	21	21
(Chinese Taipei) Chen B-y (Chinese Taipei) Sun L-c	16	17
7	(Chinese Taipei) Chen C-k (Chinese Taipei) Hsu Y-h	21	21
(Chinese Taipei) Chen Z-r (Chinese Taipei) Yang C-t	19	19
(Vietnam) Phạm V H (Vietnam) Thân V A	10	22
(South Korea) Shin T-y (South Korea) Park S	21	24

Second round
4	(China) Guo XW (China) Chen FH	21	21
(South Korea) Park K-h (South Korea) Kim Y-j	11	12
7	(Chinese Taipei) Chen C-k (Chinese Taipei) Hsu Y-h	21	21	21
(South Korea) Shin T-y (South Korea) Park S	14	23	10

Quarter-finals
4	(China) Guo XW (China) Chen FH	21	20	21
7	(Chinese Taipei) Chen C-k (Chinese Taipei) Hsu Y-h	14	22	9

=== Bottom half ===
==== Section 3 ====
First round
(South Korea) Kim D-j (South Korea) Jang E-s
(Chinese Taipei) Chen X-y (Chinese Taipei) Wang Y-z	w	/	o
(Chinese Taipei) Chiu H-c (Chinese Taipei) Lee C-c	21	9	21
SWM	(China) Zhou ZH (China) Yang JY	15	21	13
(United States) P Smith (United States) J Gai	13	12
(South Korea) Ko S-h (South Korea) Eom H-w	21	21
(Chinese Taipei) Po L-w (Chinese Taipei) Chang C-h	15	12
3	(Chinese Taipei) Yang P-h (Chinese Taipei) Hu L-f	21	21

Second round
(Chinese Taipei) Chen X-y (Chinese Taipei) Wang Y-z	15	21	12
(Chinese Taipei) Chiu H-c (Chinese Taipei) Lee C-c	21	19	21
(South Korea) Ko S-h (South Korea) Eom H-w	14	21	22
3	(Chinese Taipei) Yang P-h (Chinese Taipei) Hu L-f	21	15	20

Quarter-finals
(Chinese Taipei) Chiu H-c (Chinese Taipei) Lee C-c	17	18
(South Korea) Ko S-h (South Korea) Eom H-w	21	21

==== Section 4 ====
First round
(Malaysia) Wong T C (Malaysia) Lim C S	14	15
(South Korea) Lee S-w (South Korea) Kim B-r	21	21
(Chinese Taipei) Lu M-c (Chinese Taipei) Hung E-t	17	16
5	(Thailand) R Oupthong (Thailand) J Sudjaipraparat	21	21
(Chinese Taipei) Chen S-f (Chinese Taipei) Tsai R-l	18	19
(South Korea) Ki D-j (South Korea) Lee Y-w	21	21

Second round
(South Korea) Lee S-w (South Korea) Kim B-r	13	14
5	(Thailand) R Oupthong (Thailand) J Sudjaipraparat	21	21
(South Korea) Ki D-j (South Korea) Lee Y-w	11	21	16
2	(Indonesia) D Ferdinansyah (Indonesia) G E Widjaja	21	8	21

Quarter-finals
5	(Thailand) R Oupthong (Thailand) J Sudjaipraparat	18	12
2	(Indonesia) D Ferdinansyah (Indonesia) G E Widjaja	21	21

Preceded by 2024 Hylo Open; 2024 Indonesia Masters Super 100 II	BWF World Tour; 2024 BWF season	Succeeded by 2024 Japan Masters
