= 2023 Kaohsiung Masters =

Tournament details
- Dates: 26 September – 1 October
- Edition: 1st
- Level: Super 100
- Total prize money: US$100,000
- Venue: Kaohsiung Arena
- Location: Kaohsiung, Taiwan

Champions
- Men's singles: (Chinese Taipei) Lin Chun-yi
- Women's singles: (Chinese Taipei) Liang Ting-yu
- Men's doubles: (Malaysia) Goh Sze Fei (Malaysia) Nur Izzuddin
- Women's doubles: (Australia) Setyana Mapasa (Australia) Angela Yu
- Mixed doubles: (Japan) Hiroki Nishi (Japan) Akari Sato

The 2023 Kaohsiung Masters, officially the Victor Kaohsiung Masters 2023, was a badminton tournament which took place at the Kaohsiung Arena in Kaohsiung, Taiwan from 26 September to 1 October 2023 and had a total prize of $100,000.

== Tournament ==
The 2023 Kaohsiung Masters was the twenty-third tournament of the 2023 BWF World Tour. This was for the first time that Kaohsiung Masters would be held and included in the BWF Tour calendar. This tournament was organized by Chinese Taipei Badminton Association and sanctioned by the BWF.

=== Venue ===
This international tournament was held at the Kaohsiung Arena in Kaohsiung, Taiwan.

=== Point distribution ===
Below is a table with the point distribution for each phase of the tournament based on the BWF points system for the BWF Tour Super 100 event.

| Winner | Runner-up | 3/4 | 5/8 | 9/16 | 17/32 | 33/64 | 65/128 | 129/256 |
|---|---|---|---|---|---|---|---|---|
| 5,500 | 4,680 | 3,850 | 3,030 | 2,110 | 1,290 | 510 | 240 | 100 |

=== Prize money ===
The total prize money for this tournament is US$100,000. Distribution of prize money is in accordance with BWF regulations.

| Event | Winner | Finals | Semi-finals | Quarter-finals | Last 16 |
| Singles | $7,500 | $3,800 | $1,450 | $600 | $350 |
| Doubles | $7,900 | $3,800 | $1,400 | $725 | $375 |

== Men's singles ==
=== Seeds ===
1. (Chinese Taipei) Lin Chun-yi (Champion)
2. (Chinese Taipei) Lee Chia-hao (Quarter-finals)
3. (India) Kiran George (Second round)
4. (Japan) Takuma Obayashi (Third round)
5. (Japan) Yushi Tanaka (Final)
6. (India) B. Sai Praneeth (Withdrew)
7. (Chinese Taipei) Huang Yu-kai (Semi-finals)
8. (Malaysia) Soong Joo Ven (Second round)

=== Finals ===
Semi-finals
1 | (Chinese Taipei) Lin Chun-yi | 21 | 21
PFQ | (India) Harsheel Dani | 18 | 14
5 | (Japan) Yushi Tanaka | 21 | 21
7 | (Chinese Taipei) Huang Yu-kai | 15 | 8

Final
1 | (Chinese Taipei) Lin Chun-yi | 11 | 21 | 21
5 | (Japan) Yushi Tanaka | 21 | 17 | 14

=== Top half ===
==== Section 1 ====
First round
(Chinese Taipei) Liao J-f | 21 | 21
(United States) E Asuncion | 7 | 9
(Chinese Taipei) Yang Y | 21 | 21
Q7 | (Chinese Taipei) Lee Y-j | 15 | 10
(Chinese Taipei) Kuo K-l | 21 | 21
(Chinese Taipei) Lin K-t | 19 | 9
(India) S Dey | 24 | 21 | 21
Q2 | (Chinese Taipei) Lu W-h | 26 | 14 | 13

Second round
1 | (Chinese Taipei) Lin C-y | 21 | 16 | 21
(Chinese Taipei) Liao J-f | 17 | 21 | 14
(Malaysia) S Aidil | 17 | 10
(Chinese Taipei) Yang Y | 21 | 21
8 | (Malaysia) Soong J V | 21 | 10 | 18
(Chinese Taipei) Kuo K-l | 19 | 21 | 21
PFQ | (Japan) R Muramoto | 20 | 13
(India) S Dey | 22 | 21

Third round
1 | (Chinese Taipei) Lin C-y | 21 | 21
(Chinese Taipei) Yang Y | 5 | 5
(Chinese Taipei) Kuo K-l | 21 | 21
(India) S Dey | 16 | 11

Quarter-finals
1 | (Chinese Taipei) Lin C-y | 21 | 21
(Chinese Taipei) Kuo K-l | 19 | 16

==== Section 2 ====
First round
(Vietnam) Lê Đ P | 14 | 21 | 14
Q8 | (Japan) K Fujiwara | 21 | 14 | 21
Q1 | (Chinese Taipei) Huang P-h | 21 | 23
Q6 | (Chinese Taipei) Zhao C-x | 11 | 21
(Malaysia) Lim C K | 27 | 11 | 21
(Japan) S Ogawa | 25 | 21 | 19
(Canada) B. R. Sankeerth | 17 | 13
(Malaysia) Chua K S | 21 | 21

Second round
3 | (India) K George | 21 | 15 | 15
Q8 | (Japan) K Fujiwara | 19 | 21 | 21
(Germany) S Hsiao | 21 | 16 | 5
Q1 | (Chinese Taipei) Huang P-h | 13 | 21 | 21
PFQ | (India) H Dani | 21 | 7 | 21
(Malaysia) Lim C K | 12 | 21 | 18
PFQ | (Thailand) K Laotrakul | 16 | 21 | 19
(Malaysia) Chua K S | 21 | 18 | 21

Third round
Q8 | (Japan) K Fujiwara | 21 | 21
Q1 | (Chinese Taipei) Huang P-h | 16 | 19
PFQ | (India) H Dani | 21 | 21
(Malaysia) Chua K S | 14 | 18

Quarter-finals
Q8 | (Japan) K Fujiwara | 18 | 17
PFQ | (India) H Dani | 21 | 21

=== Bottom half ===
==== Section 3 ====
First round
(Australia) J Schueler | 11 | 10
(Vietnam) Nguyễn H Đ | 21 | 21
(Chinese Taipei) Wang P-w | 21 | 21
(Japan) R Hatano | 15 | 14
(India) S Karunakaran | 21 | 21
(Japan) K Takahashi | 11 | 14
(Chinese Taipei) Chen C-t | 14 | 21 | 21
Q3 | (Chinese Taipei) Lei C-f | 21 | 6 | 10

Second round
(Vietnam) Nguyễn H Đ | 15 | 9
Q4 | (Chinese Taipei) Tsai C-h | 21 | 21
(Chinese Taipei) Wang P-w | 21 | 16 | 6
5 | (Japan) Y Tanaka | 11 | 21 | 21
(India) S Karunakaran | 21 | 16 | 21
(Chinese Taipei) Liu W-c | 19 | 21 | 13
(Chinese Taipei) Chen C-t | 13 | 21 | 14
4 | (Japan) T Obayashi | 21 | 13 | 21

Third round
Q4 | (Chinese Taipei) Tsai C-h | 20 | 22 | 13
5 | (Japan) Y Tanaka | 22 | 20 | 21
(India) S Karunakaran | 21 | 21
4 | (Japan) T Obayashi | 19 | 18

Quarter-finals
5 | (Japan) Y Tanaka | 21 | 21
(India) S Karunakaran | 17 | 8

==== Section 4 ====
First round
(Chinese Taipei) Huang Y | 21 | 21
Q5 | (Chinese Taipei) Yang C-c | 14 | 12
(Chinese Taipei) Chang S-c | 21 | 21
PFQ | (Chinese Taipei) Lin Y-h | 18 | 18
(South Korea) Son W-h | 21 | 16 | 21
(Malaysia) Kok J H | 12 | 21 | 16
PFQ | (Malaysia) Tan J J | 21 | 22
(India) K K Mekala | 19 | 20

Second round
(Chinese Taipei) Huang Y | 26 | 20 | 21
(Japan) M Koga | 24 | 22 | 18
(Chinese Taipei) Chang S-c | 16 | 21 | 19
7 | (Chinese Taipei) Huang Y-k | 21 | 16 | 21
(South Korea) Son W-h | 21 | 23
(Chinese Taipei) Lu C-h | 14 | 21
PFQ | (Malaysia) Tan J J | 7 | 13
2 | (Chinese Taipei) Lee C-h | 21 | 21

Third round
(Chinese Taipei) Huang Y | 19 | 11
7 | (Chinese Taipei) Huang Y-k | 21 | 21
(South Korea) Son W-h | 21 | 15 | 16
2 | (Chinese Taipei) Lee C-h | 9 | 21 | 21

Quarter-finals
7 | (Chinese Taipei) Huang Y-k | 21 | 21
2 | (Chinese Taipei) Lee C-h | 14 | 16

== Women's singles ==
=== Seeds ===
1. (Chinese Taipei) Pai Yu-po (First round)
2. (Japan) Nozomi Okuhara (Second round)
3. (United States) Lauren Lam (First round)
4. (Chinese Taipei) Huang Yu-hsun (First round)
5. (Japan) Riko Gunji (Final)
6. (India) Tanya Hemanth (First round)
7. (Malaysia) Kisona Selvaduray (Second round)
8. (Thailand) Lalinrat Chaiwan (Second round)

=== Finals ===
Semi-finals
(Chinese Taipei) Chiu Pin-chian | 12 | 21 | 15
5 | (Japan) Riko Gunji | 21 | 15 | 21
(Chinese Taipei) Liang Ting-yu | 13
(Japan) Hirari Mizui | 12^{r}

Final
5 | (Japan) Riko Gunji | 20 | 21 | 14
(Chinese Taipei) Liang Ting-yu | 22 | 15 | 21

=== Top half ===
==== Section 1 ====
First round
1 | (Chinese Taipei) Pai Y-p | 22 | 14 | 20
(Chinese Taipei) Chiu P-c | 20 | 21 | 22
Q3 | (Chinese Taipei) Liao Y-c | 16 | 21 | 17
(Vietnam) Vũ T A T | 21 | 18 | 21
8 | (Thailand) L Chaiwan | 21 | 21
(Japan) A Takahashi | 11 | 12
(India) Gadde R S | 10 | 21
Q4 | (Chinese Taipei) Lee Y-h | 21 | 23

Second round
(Chinese Taipei) Chiu P-c | 21 | 21
(Vietnam) Vũ T A T | 19 | 15
8 | (Thailand) L Chaiwan | 22 | 14
Q4 | (Chinese Taipei) Lee Y-h | 24 | 21

Quarter-finals
(Chinese Taipei) Chiu P-c | 22 | 21
Q4 | (Chinese Taipei) Lee Y-h | 20 | 17

==== Section 2 ====
First round
4 | (Chinese Taipei) Huang Y-h | 12 | 21 | 21
(Malaysia) Wong L C | 21 | 13 | 23
(Thailand) P Choeikeewong | 21 | 21
Q1 | (Chinese Taipei) Tsai H-p | 6 | 18
5 | (Japan) R Gunji | 21 | 21
(Chinese Taipei) Huang C-p | 16 | 14
(India) K Mopati | 10 | 19
(Chinese Taipei) Lin S-y | 21 | 21

Second round
(Malaysia) Wong L C | 21 | 21
(Thailand) P Choeikeewong | 15 | 16
5 | (Japan) R Gunji | 21 | 21
(Chinese Taipei) Lin S-y | 19 | 11

Quarter-finals
(Malaysia) Wong L C | 18 | 13
5 | (Japan) R Gunji | 21 | 21

=== Bottom half ===
==== Section 3 ====
First round
(Chinese Taipei) Chiang Y-l | 20 | 21 | 16
(Chinese Taipei) Hung Y-t | 22 | 18 | 21
(Japan) M Suizu | 21 | 22 | 21
6 | (India) T Hemanth | 23 | 20 | 19
PFQ | (Chinese Taipei) Huang Z-l | 26 | 21
(Azerbaijan) K F Azzahra | 24 | 14
(Chinese Taipei) Liang T-y | 21 | 21
3 | (United States) L Lam | 13 | 10

Second round
(Chinese Taipei) Hung Y-t | 17 | 19
(Japan) M Suizu | 21 | 21
PFQ | (Chinese Taipei) Huang Z-l | 15 | 11
(Chinese Taipei) Liang T-y | 21 | 21

Quarter-finals
(Japan) M Suizu | 21 | 18 | 14
(Chinese Taipei) Liang T-y | 14 | 21 | 21

==== Section 4 ====
First round
(Chinese Taipei) Chen S-y | 12 | 15
Q2 | (Chinese Taipei) Ko R-h | 21 | 21
(Chinese Taipei) Tung C-t | 19 | 12
7 | (Malaysia) Kisona S | 21 | 21
(Japan) A Kurihara | 21 | 18 | 17
(Japan) H Mizui | 14 | 21 | 21
(Hong Kong) Yeung S Y | 10 | 8
2 | (Japan) N Okuhara | 21 | 21

Second round
Q2 | (Chinese Taipei) Ko R-h | 21 | 22
7 | (Malaysia) Kisona S | 18 | 20
(Japan) H Mizui | w | / | o
2 | (Japan) N Okuhara

Quarter-finals
Q2 | (Chinese Taipei) Ko R-h | 16 | 21 | 10
(Japan) H Mizui | 21 | 18 | 21

== Men's doubles ==
=== Seeds ===
1. (Chinese Taipei) Lee Jhe-huei / Yang Po-hsuan (Final)
2. (Chinese Taipei) Lee Fang-chih / Lee Fang-jen (Quarter-finals)
3. (Chinese Taipei) Chang Ko-chi / Po Li-wei (Second round)
4. (Japan) Ayato Endo / Yuta Takei (Second round)
5. (India) Krishna Prasad Garaga / Vishnuvardhan Goud Panjala (First round)
6. (Chinese Taipei) Chiu Hsiang-chieh / Yang Ming-tse (First round)
7. (Malaysia) Goh Sze Fei / Nur Izzuddin (Champions)
8. (Japan) Shuntaro Mezaki / Haruya Nishida (First round)

=== Finals ===
Semi-finals
1 | (Chinese Taipei) Lee Jhe-huei (Chinese Taipei) Yang Po-hsuan | 21 | 21
(Japan) Kenya Mitsuhashi (Japan) Hiroki Okamura | 16 | 18
Q1 | (Malaysia) Nur Mohd Azriyn Ayub (Malaysia) Tan Wee Kiong | 12 | 17
7 | (Malaysia) Goh Sze Fei (Malaysia) Nur Izzuddin | 21 | 21

Final
1 | (Chinese Taipei) Lee Jhe-huei (Chinese Taipei) Yang Po-hsuan | 14 | 10
7 | (Malaysia) Goh Sze Fei (Malaysia) Nur Izzuddin | 21 | 21

=== Top half ===
==== Section 1 ====
First round
1 | (Chinese Taipei) Lee J-h (Chinese Taipei) Yang P-h | 21 | 21
(Japan) T Nomura (Japan) Y Shimogami | 16 | 17
(India) A R Doddavarapu (India) V Veeramreddy | 25 | 21
(Thailand) P Thongkham (Thailand) W Thongkham | 23 | 16
8 | (Japan) S Mezaki (Japan) H Nishida | 17 | 21 | 20
(Malaysia) Lwi S H (Malaysia) J Wong | 21 | 18 | 22
(Malaysia) Boon X Y (Malaysia) Wong T C | 17 | 15
(Chinese Taipei) Chen Z-r (Chinese Taipei) Lu C | 21 | 21

Second round
1 | (Chinese Taipei) Lee J-h (Chinese Taipei) Yang P-h | 21 | 21
(India) A R Doddavarapu (India) V Veeramreddy | 12 | 8
(Malaysia) Lwi S H (Malaysia) J Wong | 21 | 21
(Chinese Taipei) Chen Z-r (Chinese Taipei) Lu C | 16 | 19

Quarter-finals
1 | (Chinese Taipei) Lee J-h (Chinese Taipei) Yang P-h | 21 | 21
(Malaysia) Lwi S H (Malaysia) J Wong | 17 | 16

==== Section 2 ====
First round
4 | (Japan) A Endo (Japan) Y Takei | 21 | 21
Q2 | (Japan) T Aizawa (Japan) Y Noda | 14 | 17
Q4 | (Chinese Taipei) Chen C-k (Chinese Taipei) Chen S-f | 16 | 12
(Japan) K Mitsuhashi (Japan) H Okamura | 21 | 21
5 | (India) K P Garaga (India) V G Panjala | 21 | 6 | 10
(Malaysia) Choong H J (Malaysia) M Haikal | 15 | 21 | 21
(United States) Chen Z-y (United States) P Smith | 11 | 20
(Chinese Taipei) Wei C-w (Chinese Taipei) Wu G-x | 21 | 22

Second round
4 | (Japan) A Endo (Japan) Y Takei | 18 | 16
(Japan) K Mitsuhashi (Japan) H Okamura | 21 | 21
(Malaysia) Choong H J (Malaysia) M Haikal | 14 | 19
(Chinese Taipei) Wei C-w (Chinese Taipei) Wu G-x | 21 | 21

Quarter-finals
(Japan) K Mitsuhashi (Japan) H Okamura | 21 | 21
(Chinese Taipei) Wei C-w (Chinese Taipei) Wu G-x | 19 | 17

=== Bottom half ===
==== Section 3 ====
First round
(Chinese Taipei) Lin Y-c (Chinese Taipei) Su L-w | 21 | 20
(Chinese Taipei) Lu M-c (Chinese Taipei) Tang K-w | 23 | 22
(Malaysia) J Arif (Malaysia) Yap R K | 21 | 21
6 | (Chinese Taipei) Chiu H-c (Chinese Taipei) Yang M-t | 16 | 17
Q1 | (Malaysia) N M Azriyn A (Malaysia) Tan W K | 21 | 21
(Australia) K M Edison (Australia) J Yu | 11 | 8
Q3 | (Chinese Taipei) Lin B-w (Chinese Taipei) Tseng P-c | 14 | 14
3 | (Chinese Taipei) Chang K-c (Chinese Taipei) Po L-w | 21 | 21

Second round
(Chinese Taipei) Lu M-c (Chinese Taipei) Tang K-w | 21 | 22
(Malaysia) J Arif (Malaysia) Yap R K | 18 | 20
Q1 | (Malaysia) N M Azriyn A (Malaysia) Tan W K | 21 | 21
3 | (Chinese Taipei) Chang K-c (Chinese Taipei) Po L-w | 18 | 18

Quarter-finals
(Chinese Taipei) Lu M-c (Chinese Taipei) Tang K-w | 19 | 16
Q1 | (Malaysia) N M Azriyn A (Malaysia) Tan W K | 21 | 21

==== Section 4 ====
First round
(Malaysia) Low H Y (Malaysia) Ng E C | 21 | 21
(Japan) K Kumagai (Japan) K Ogawa | 18 | 17
(Thailand) T Punpanich (Thailand) W Sothon | 16 | 19
7 | (Malaysia) Goh S F (Malaysia) N Izzuddin | 21 | 21
(Malaysia) Beh C M (Malaysia) Goh B Z | 16 | 24 | 21
(Chinese Taipei) Chiang C-w (Chinese Taipei) Wu H-y | 21 | 22 | 19
(Japan) S Ogawa (Japan) D Sano | 17 | 16
2 | (Chinese Taipei) Lee F-c (Chinese Taipei) Lee F-j | 21 | 21

Second round
(Malaysia) Low H Y (Malaysia) Ng E C | 15 | 19
7 | (Malaysia) Goh S F (Malaysia) N Izzuddin | 21 | 21
(Malaysia) Beh C M (Malaysia) Goh B Z | 7 | 17
2 | (Chinese Taipei) Lee F-c (Chinese Taipei) Lee F-j | 21 | 21

Quarter-finals
7 | (Malaysia) Goh S F (Malaysia) N Izzuddin | 21 | 21
2 | (Chinese Taipei) Lee F-c (Chinese Taipei) Lee F-j | 14 | 9

== Women's doubles ==
=== Seeds ===
1. (Chinese Taipei) Liu Chiao-yun / Wang Yu-qiao (Quarter-finals)
2. (Chinese Taipei) Hsieh Pei-shan / Tseng Yu-chi (First round)
3. (United States) Paula Lynn Cao Hok / Lauren Lam (Second round)
4. (Chinese Taipei) Hu Ling-fang / Lin Xiao-min (Second round)
5. (Japan) Sayaka Hobara / Yui Suizu (Quarter-finals)
6. (Chinese Taipei) Hung En-tzu / Lin Yu-pei (Quarter-finals)
7. (Australia) Setyana Mapasa / Angela Yu (Champions)
8. (Hong Kong) Fan Ka Yan / Yau Mau Ying (Semi-finals)

=== Finals ===
Semi-finals
8 | (Hong Kong) Fan Ka Yan (Hong Kong) Yau Mau Ying | 21 | 18 | 17
(Japan) Maiko Kawazoe (Japan) Haruna Konishi | 16 | 21 | 21
(Chinese Taipei) Hsu Yin-hui (Chinese Taipei) Lin Jhih-yun | 12 | 22 | 21
7 | (Australia) Setyana Mapasa (Australia) Angela Yu | 21 | 20 | 23

Final
(Japan) Maiko Kawazoe (Japan) Haruna Konishi | 19 | 21 | 19
7 | (Australia) Setyana Mapasa (Australia) Angela Yu | 21 | 8 | 21

=== Top half ===
==== Section 1 ====
First round
1 | (Chinese Taipei) Liu C-y (Chinese Taipei) Wang Y-q | 21 | 17 | 21
(Chinese Taipei) Huang Z-l (Chinese Taipei) Ko R-h | 10 | 21 | 10
(Chinese Taipei) Hsieh C-y (Chinese Taipei) Lu H-a | w | / | o
(Thailand) P Phatcharaphisutsin (Thailand) N Sukklad
8 | (Hong Kong) Fan K Y (Hong Kong) Yau M Y | 21 | 21
(Hong Kong) Leung Y Y (Hong Kong) Tsang H Y | 18 | 18
(Chinese Taipei) Sung Y-h (Chinese Taipei) Wang S-m | 21 | 21
(Chinese Taipei) N G Chan (Chinese Taipei) Chen H-y | 19 | 16

Second round
1 | (Chinese Taipei) Liu C-y (Chinese Taipei) Wang Y-q | 21 | 21
(Chinese Taipei) Hsieh C-y (Chinese Taipei) Lu H-a | 6 | 12
8 | (Hong Kong) Fan K Y (Hong Kong) Yau M Y | 21 | 21
(Chinese Taipei) Sung Y-h (Chinese Taipei) Wang S-m | 13 | 12

Quarter-finals
1 | (Chinese Taipei) Liu C-y (Chinese Taipei) Wang Y-q | 18 | 23 | 12
8 | (Hong Kong) Fan K Y (Hong Kong) Yau M Y | 21 | 21 | 21

==== Section 2 ====
First round
3 | (United States) P L Cao Hok (United States) L Lam | 14 | 21 | 21
(Chinese Taipei) Liu Z-x (Chinese Taipei) Yang Y-h | 21 | 16 | 18
(Japan) M Kawazoe (Japan) H Konishi | 21 | 21
(Chinese Taipei) Chen Y-f (Chinese Taipei) Liang C-s | 14 | 10
6 | (Chinese Taipei) Hung E-t (Chinese Taipei) Lin Y-p | 21 | 21
Q2 | (Chinese Taipei) Li T-p (Chinese Taipei) Wang Y-z | 16 | 11
(Japan) H Suzuki (Japan) A Uesugi | 17 | 21 | 19
(Chinese Taipei) Jiang Y-h (Chinese Taipei) Li Z-q | 21 | 18 | 21

Second round
3 | (United States) P L Cao Hok (United States) L Lam | 18 | 7
(Japan) M Kawazoe (Japan) H Konishi | 21 | 21
6 | (Chinese Taipei) Hung E-t (Chinese Taipei) Lin Y-p | 21 | 21
(Chinese Taipei) Jiang Y-h (Chinese Taipei) Li Z-q | 12 | 18

Quarter-finals
(Japan) M Kawazoe (Japan) H Konishi | 19 | 21 | 21
6 | (Chinese Taipei) Hung E-t (Chinese Taipei) Lin Y-p | 21 | 19 | 18

=== Bottom half ===
==== Section 3 ====
First round
(Chinese Taipei) Hsieh Y-t (Chinese Taipei) Hsu J-y | 10 | 11
(Chinese Taipei) Chung K-y (Chinese Taipei) Sung Y-h | 21 | 21
Q3 | (Chinese Taipei) Lee P-y (Chinese Taipei) Liao J-c | 6 | 8
5 | (Japan) S Hobara (Japan) Y Suizu | 21 | 21
(Chinese Taipei) Hsu Y-h (Chinese Taipei) Lin J-yu | 17 | 21 | 21
(Chinese Taipei) Huang Y-h (Chinese Taipei) Liang T-y | 21 | 9 | 17
(Chinese Taipei) Hsieh M-y (Chinese Taipei) Hsu T | 11 | 12
4 | (Chinese Taipei) Hu L-f (Chinese Taipei) Lin X-m | 21 | 21

Second round
(Chinese Taipei) Chung K-y (Chinese Taipei) Sung Y-h | 14 | 13
5 | (Japan) S Hobara (Japan) Y Suizu | 21 | 21
(Chinese Taipei) Hsu Y-h (Chinese Taipei) Lin J-yu | 14 | 21 | 21
4 | (Chinese Taipei) Hu L-f (Chinese Taipei) Lin X-m | 21 | 17 | 17

Quarter-finals
5 | (Japan) S Hobara (Japan) Y Suizu | 22 | 18 | 13
(Chinese Taipei) Hsu Y-h (Chinese Taipei) Lin J-yu | 20 | 21 | 21

==== Section 4 ====
First round
(Chinese Taipei) Cheng Y-p (Chinese Taipei) Sun W-p | 21 | 21
Q4 | (Chinese Taipei) Chuang C-y (Chinese Taipei) Lin J-yi | 9 | 9
(Chinese Taipei) Chiu P-c (Chinese Taipei) Tung C-t | 15 | 5
7 | (Australia) S Mapasa (Australia) A Yu | 21 | 21
(Chinese Taipei) Lin C-c (Chinese Taipei) Wu M-c | 17 | 21 | 21
Q1 | (Hong Kong) Leung S L (Hong Kong) Ng S Y | 21 | 9 | 18
(Japan) M Otake (Japan) M Takahashi | 21 | 13 | 21
2 | (Chinese Taipei) Hsieh P-s (Chinese Taipei) Tseng Y-c | 11 | 21 | 16

Second round
(Chinese Taipei) Cheng Y-p (Chinese Taipei) Sun W-p | 15 | 11
7 | (Australia) S Mapasa (Australia) A Yu | 21 | 21
(Chinese Taipei) Lin C-c (Chinese Taipei) Wu M-c | 13 | 17
(Japan) M Otake (Japan) M Takahashi | 21 | 21

Quarter-finals
7 | (Australia) S Mapasa (Australia) A Yu | 19 | 21 | 21
(Japan) M Otake (Japan) M Takahashi | 21 | 15 | 19

== Mixed doubles ==
=== Seeds ===
1. (Indonesia) Dejan Ferdinansyah / Gloria Emanuelle Widjaja (Final)
2. (Chinese Taipei) Chang Ko-chi / Lee Chih-chen (Quarter-finals)
3. (Chinese Taipei) Yang Po-hsuan / Hu Ling-fang (Quarter-finals)
4. (Malaysia) Hoo Pang Ron / Teoh Mei Xing (Withdrew)
5. (Thailand) Ruttanapak Oupthong / Jhenicha Sudjaipraparat (Semi-finals)
6. (Chinese Taipei) Chiu Hsiang-chieh / Lin Xiao-min (Semi-finals)
7. (Chinese Taipei) Wei Chun-wei / Nicole Gonzales Chan (First round)
8. (Hong Kong) Chang Tak Ching / Fu Chi Yan (Second round)

=== Finals ===
Semi-finals
1 | (Indonesia) Dejan Ferdinansyah (Indonesia) Gloria Emanuelle Widjaja | 21 | 21
6 | (Chinese Taipei) Chiu Hsiang-chieh (Chinese Taipei) Lin Xiao-min | 18 | 7
(Japan) Hiroki Nishi (Japan) Akari Sato | 21 | 21
5 | (Thailand) Ruttanapak Oupthong (Thailand) Jhenicha Sudjaipraparat | 10 | 17

Final
1 | (Indonesia) Dejan Ferdinansyah (Indonesia) Gloria Emanuelle Widjaja | 20 | 21 | 14
(Japan) Hiroki Nishi (Japan) Akari Sato | 22 | 12 | 21

=== Top half ===
==== Section 1 ====
First round
1 | (Indonesia) D Ferdinansyah (Indonesia) G E Widjaja | 21 | 21
(Chinese Taipei) Su L-w (Chinese Taipei) Sun W-p | 10 | 11
(Chinese Taipei) Chen S-f (Chinese Taipei) Wang Y-z | 12 | 21 | 10
(Chinese Taipei) Po L-w (Chinese Taipei) Hung Y-e | 21 | 17 | 21
7 | (Chinese Taipei) Wei C-w (Chinese Taipei) N G Chan | 22 | 17 | 15
(Chinese Taipei) Wu H-y (Chinese Taipei) Chen H-y | 20 | 21 | 21
(Chinese Taipei) Lu M-c (Chinese Taipei) Hung E-t | 16 | 13
(Chinese Taipei) Cheng K-w (Chinese Taipei) Liu C-y | 21 | 21

Second round
1 | (Indonesia) D Ferdinansyah (Indonesia) G E Widjaja | 21 | 21
(Chinese Taipei) Po L-w (Chinese Taipei) Hung Y-e | 14 | 14
(Chinese Taipei) Wu H-y (Chinese Taipei) Chen H-y | 16 | 14
(Chinese Taipei) Cheng K-w (Chinese Taipei) Liu C-y | 21 | 21

Quarter-finals
1 | (Indonesia) D Ferdinansyah (Indonesia) G E Widjaja | 21 | 21
(Chinese Taipei) Cheng K-w (Chinese Taipei) Liu C-y | 17 | 11

==== Section 2 ====
First round
3 | (Chinese Taipei) Yang P-h (Chinese Taipei) Hu L-f | 21 | 21
Q1 | (Chinese Taipei) Liu K-h (Chinese Taipei) Wang Y-q | 16 | 13
(Malaysia) Lim T J (Malaysia) D Siow | 22 | 13 | 12
(Chinese Taipei) Lin B-w (Chinese Taipei) Lin C-c | 20 | 21 | 21
6 | (Chinese Taipei) Chiu H-c (Chinese Taipei) Lin X-m | 21 | 22
(Chinese Taipei) Yang M-t (Chinese Taipei) Yang Y-h | 11 | 20
Q4 | (Chinese Taipei) Chen C-k (Chinese Taipei) Hsu Y-h | 23 | 21
Q2 | (Chinese Taipei) Lee F-c (Chinese Taipei) Lin J-y | 21 | 11

Second round
3 | (Chinese Taipei) Yang P-h (Chinese Taipei) Hu L-f | 21 | 21
(Chinese Taipei) Lin B-w (Chinese Taipei) Lin C-c | 11 | 13
6 | (Chinese Taipei) Chiu H-c (Chinese Taipei) Lin X-m | 21 | 21
Q4 | (Chinese Taipei) Chen C-k (Chinese Taipei) Hsu Y-h | 19 | 18

Quarter-finals
3 | (Chinese Taipei) Yang P-h (Chinese Taipei) Hu L-f | 21 | 18 | 23
6 | (Chinese Taipei) Chiu H-c (Chinese Taipei) Lin X-m | 12 | 21 | 25

=== Bottom half ===
==== Section 3 ====
First round
(Chinese Taipei) Chen X-y (Chinese Taipei) Tsai R-l | 16 | 15
(Chinese Taipei) Lee F-j (Chinese Taipei) Lin Y-y | 21 | 21
(Chinese Taipei) Tseng P-c (Chinese Taipei) Sung Yu-h | 21 | 14 | 17
8 | (Hong Kong) Chang T C (Hong Kong) Fu C Y | 14 | 21 | 21
(Japan) H Nishi (Japan) Ak Sato | 21 | 21
(Chinese Taipei) Lo C-w (Chinese Taipei) Sung Yi-h | 12 | 12
(Chinese Taipei) Lin C-y (Chinese Taipei) Kuo Y-w | 21 | 19 | 21
PFQ | (Chinese Taipei) Lu C (Chinese Taipei) Cheng Y-p | 12 | 21 | 15

Second round
(Chinese Taipei) Lee F-j (Chinese Taipei) Lin Y-y | 21 | 23
8 | (Hong Kong) Chang T C (Hong Kong) Fu C Y | 10 | 21
(Japan) H Nishi (Japan) Ak Sato | 21 | 21 | 23
(Chinese Taipei) Lin C-y (Chinese Taipei) Kuo Y-w | 13 | 23 | 21

Quarter-finals
(Chinese Taipei) Lee F-j (Chinese Taipei) Lin Y-y | 15 | 16
(Japan) H Nishi (Japan) Ak Sato | 21 | 21

==== Section 4 ====
First round
(Chinese Taipei) Tseng M-h (Chinese Taipei) Hsieh P-s | 15 | 21 | 10
(Chinese Taipei) Chen B-y (Chinese Taipei) Chung K-y | 21 | 13 | 21
(Japan) Y Eto (Japan) A Kamiyama | 21 | 12
5 | (Thailand) R Oupthong (Thailand) J Sudjaipraparat | 23 | 21
Q3 | (Hong Kong) Li K H (Hong Kong) Leung S L | 16 | 19
(Japan) K Kumagai (Japan) An Sato | 21 | 21
(Chinese Taipei) Chen Z-r (Chinese Taipei) Li T-p | 17 | 14
2 | (Chinese Taipei) Chang K-c (Chinese Taipei) Lee C-c | 21 | 21

Second round
(Chinese Taipei) Chen B-y (Chinese Taipei) Chung K-y | 19 | 18
5 | (Thailand) R Oupthong (Thailand) J Sudjaipraparat | 21 | 21
(Japan) K Kumagai (Japan) An Sato | 12 | 15
2 | (Chinese Taipei) Chang K-c (Chinese Taipei) Lee C-c | 21 | 21

Quarter-finals
5 | (Thailand) R Oupthong (Thailand) J Sudjaipraparat | 22 | 21
2 | (Chinese Taipei) Chang K-c (Chinese Taipei) Lee C-c | 20 | 17

| Preceded by 2023 Hong Kong Open; 2023 Vietnam Open | BWF World Tour; 2023 BWF season | Succeeded by 2023 Arctic Open |
