= 2023 Vietnam Open =

Badminton tournament in Vietnam

Tournament details
- Dates: 12–17 September
- Edition: 18th
- Level: Super 100
- Total prize money: US$100,000
- Venue: Nguyen Du Cultural Sports Club
- Location: Ho Chi Minh City, Vietnam

Champions
- Men's singles: (Chinese Taipei) Huang Yu-kai
- Women's singles: (Vietnam) Nguyễn Thùy Linh
- Men's doubles: (Japan) Kenya Mitsuhashi (Japan) Hiroki Okamura
- Women's doubles: (Chinese Taipei) Hsieh Pei-shan (Chinese Taipei) Tseng Yu-chi
- Mixed doubles: (Japan) Hiroki Nishi (Japan) Akari Sato

The 2023 Vietnam Open (officially known as the Yonex-Sunrise Vietnam Open 2023 for sponsorship reasons) was a badminton tournament which took place at Nguyen Du Cultural Sports Club in Ho Chi Minh City, Vietnam, from 12 to 17 September 2023 and had a total purse of $100,000.

== Tournament ==
The 2023 Vietnam Open was the twenty-fourth tournament of the 2023 BWF World Tour and also part of the Vietnam Open championships, which had been held since 1996. This tournament was organized by the Vietnam Badminton Association and sanctioned by the BWF.

=== Venue ===
This tournament was held at Nguyen Du Cultural Sports Club in Ho Chi Minh City, Vietnam.

=== Point distribution ===
Below is the point distribution table for each phase of the tournament based on the BWF points system for the BWF Tour Super 100 event.

Winner	Runner-up	3/4	5/8	9/16	17/32	33/64	65/128	129/256
5,500	4,680	3,850	3,030	2,110	1,290	510	240	100

=== Prize pool ===
The total prize money is US$100,000 with the distribution of the prize money in accordance with BWF regulations.

Event	Winner	Finalist	Semi-finals	Quarter-finals	Last 16
Singles	$7,500	$3,800	$1,450	$600	$350
Doubles	$7,900	$3,800	$1,400	$725	$375

== Men's singles ==
=== Seeds ===
1. (Japan) Koki Watanabe (Quarter-finals)
2. (Japan) Takuma Obayashi (Final)
3. (Japan) Yushi Tanaka (Third round)
4. (India) B. Sai Praneeth (Second round)
5. (India) Sameer Verma (Withdrew)
6. (Chinese Taipei) Huang Yu-kai (Champion)
7. (Malaysia) Soong Joo Ven (Second round)
8. (India) Meiraba Maisnam (Second round)

=== Finals ===
Semi-finals
6	(Chinese Taipei) Huang Yu-kai	24	21	21
(Chinese Taipei) Wang Po-wei	26	18	16
(Singapore) Jason Teh	19	21	19
2	(Japan) Takuma Obayashi	21	17	21

Final
6	(Chinese Taipei) Huang Yu-kai	21	21
2	(Japan) Takuma Obayashi	13	17

=== Top half ===
==== Section 1 ====
First round
Q3	(Japan) K Fujiwara	12	21	21
Q4	(South Korea) Kim D-h	21	18	17
(Vietnam) Nguyễn H Đ	14	21	14
(Chinese Taipei) Kuo K-l	21	18	21
(Japan) R Hatano	22	21	21
(Malaysia) Kok J H	24	17	14
(India) S Karunakaran	21	21
(India) A Hari	14	11

Second round
1	(Japan) K Watanabe	21	21
Q3	(Japan) K Fujiwara	14	14
(Vietnam) Lê Đ P	21	22
(Chinese Taipei) Kuo K-l	13	20
6	(Chinese Taipei) Huang Y-k	21	21
(Japan) R Hatano	19	8
(Chinese Taipei) Huang Y	21	21
(India) S Karunakaran	14	19

Third round
1	(Japan) K Watanabe	21	21
(Vietnam) Lê Đ P	15	8
6	(Chinese Taipei) Huang Y-k	21	22
(Chinese Taipei) Huang Y	16	20

Quarter-finals
1	(Japan) K Watanabe	20	10
6	(Chinese Taipei) Huang Y-k	22	21

==== Section 2 ====
First round
Q8	(India) S C Koya	21	23	14
(Malaysia) Ong Z Y	18	25	21
PFQ	(Malaysia) E Vasigaran	0^{r}
(India) A Mishra	5
(Malaysia) Lee S Y	21	17	19
(Chinese Taipei) Lin K-t	19	21	21
PFQ	(India) R Sanjeevi	18	17
(Indonesia) T Sugiarto	21	21

Second round
4	(India) B. Sai Praneeth	13	21	19
(Malaysia) Ong Z Y	21	18	21
(Chinese Taipei) Wang P-w	13	21	21
(India) A Mishra	21	14	9
8	(India) M Maisnam	12	16
(Chinese Taipei) Lin K-t	21	21
(India) K Gulshan Kumar	21	17	18
(Indonesia) T Sugiarto	16	21	21

Third round
(Malaysia) Ong Z Y	20	6
(Chinese Taipei) Wang P-w	22	21
(Chinese Taipei) Lin K-t	14	21	21
(Indonesia) T Sugiarto	21	14	18

Quarter-finals
(Chinese Taipei) Wang P-w	21	21
(Chinese Taipei) Lin K-t	13	11

=== Bottom half ===
==== Section 3 ====
First round
Q1	(Chinese Taipei) Ting Y-c	16	21	16
(Chinese Taipei) Liao J-f	21	9	21
Q5	(Chinese Taipei) Hsu Y-h	9	14
(Japan) K Takahashi	21	21
(Singapore) J Teh	21	21
(India) K K Mekala	11	12
Q6	(India) A Tandon	21	21
(Nigeria) A J Opeyori	9	17

Second round
(Chinese Taipei) Liao J-f	21	21
Q7	(Malaysia) Tan J J	15	19
(Japan) K Takahashi	21	21
PFQ	(Japan) S Ogawa	18	15
(Singapore) J Teh	21	21
(Singapore) J Koh	15	14
Q6	(India) A Tandon	12	16
3	(Japan) Y Tanaka	21	21

Third round
(Chinese Taipei) Liao J-f	7	21	20
(Japan) K Takahashi	21	10	22
(Singapore) J Teh	21	21
3	(Japan) Y Tanaka	16	19

Quarter-finals
(Japan) K Takahashi	18	19
(Singapore) J Teh	21	21

==== Section 4 ====
First round
(India) S Gupta	19	17
(Chinese Taipei) Chen C-t	21	21
(Australia) J Schueler	11	11
(South Korea) Son W-h	21	21
(Malaysia) Chua K S	21	21
(Egypt) A H Elgamal	6	19
(Malaysia) Ong K Y	21	18	22
(Sri Lanka) V Nettasinghe	10	21	20

Second round
(Chinese Taipei) Chen C-t	19	21
Q2	(Thailand) S Jamsri	21	23
(South Korea) Son W-h	21	11	22
7	(Malaysia) Soong J V	15	21	20
(Malaysia) Chua K S	21	21
(Malaysia) Lim C K	17	9
(Malaysia) Ong K Y	18	19
2	(Japan) T Obayashi	21	21

Third round
Q2	(Thailand) S Jamsri	19	22	21
(South Korea) Son W-h	21	20	14
(Malaysia) Chua K S	11	14
2	(Japan) T Obayashi	21	21

Quarter-finals
Q2	(Thailand) S Jamsri	14	19
2	(Japan) T Obayashi	21	21

== Women's singles ==
=== Seeds ===
1. (Vietnam) Nguyễn Thùy Linh (Champion)
2. (Japan) Riko Gunji (First round)
3. (India) Tasnim Mir (First round)
4. (India) Tanya Hemanth (Second round)
5. (Myanmar) Thet Htar Thuzar (Semi-finals)
6. (Malaysia) Letshanaa Karupathevan (Quarter-finals)
7. (Hungary) Vivien Sándorházi (First round)
8. (Canada) Rachel Chan (First round)

=== Finals ===
Semi-finals
1	(Vietnam) Nguyễn Thùy Linh	21	16	21
(Japan) Manami Suizu	12	21	7
Q3	(Japan) Akari Kurihara	21	18
5	(Myanmar) Thet Htar Thuzar	12	14^{r}

Final
1	(Vietnam) Nguyễn Thùy Linh	21	11	21
Q3	(Japan) Akari Kurihara	14	21	19

=== Top half ===
==== Section 1 ====
First round
1	(Vietnam) Nguyễn T L	16	21	21
(Vietnam) Vũ T T	21	19	19
(Chinese Taipei) Chen S-y	16	8
(Vietnam) Vũ T A T	21	21
7	(Hungary) V Sándorházi	10	10
(Thailand) P Choeikeewong	21	21
(Chinese Taipei) Liang T-y	21	21
Q2	(India) K Mopati	12	13

Second round
1	(Vietnam) Nguyễn T L	21	21
(Vietnam) Vũ T A T	18	11
(Thailand) P Choeikeewong	22	21
(Chinese Taipei) Liang T-y	20	14

Quarter-finals
1	(Vietnam) Nguyễn T L	21	21
(Thailand) P Choeikeewong	11	19

==== Section 2 ====
First round
4	(India) T Hemanth	21	21
PFQ	(Australia) Teoh K Q	6	8
Q4	(India) A Rawat	15	13
(Japan) M Suizu	21	21
6	(Malaysia) Letshanaa K	21	16	21
(Indonesia) Y Y Susanto	19	21	18
(India) I Sharma	15	6
PFQ	(Chinese Taipei) Hung Y-t	21	21

Second round
4	(India) T Hemanth	17	12
(Japan) M Suizu	21	21
6	(Malaysia) Letshanaa K	21	15	21
PFQ	(Chinese Taipei) Hung Y-t	14	21	18

Quarter-finals
(Japan) M Suizu	21	21
6	(Malaysia) Letshanaa K	14	10

=== Bottom half ===
==== Section 3 ====
First round
(Chinese Taipei) Tung C-t	21	21
(Egypt) D Hany	11	8
(Chinese Taipei) Lin S-y	16	21	25
8	(Canada) R Chan	21	14	23
Q3	(Japan) A Kurihara	21	21
Q1	(India) D Singh	17	13
PFQ	(Indonesia) A S Fatetani	21	14	21
3	(India) T Mir	12	21	16

Second round
(Chinese Taipei) Tung C-t	10	21	16
(Chinese Taipei) Lin S-y	21	14	21
Q3	(Japan) A Kurihara	17	21	21
(Indonesia) A S Fatetani	21	19	12

Quarter-finals
(Chinese Taipei) Lin S-y	17	11
Q3	(Japan) A Kurihara	21	21

==== Section 4 ====
First round
(Singapore) Insyirah K	12	10
(India) A Bhatt	21	21
(India) Gadde R S	8	15
5	(Myanmar) Thet Htar T	21	21
PFQ	(Egypt) N Ahmed Youssri
(Japan) S Saito	w	/	o
(Chinese Taipei) Chiu P-c	11	21	21
2	(Japan) R Gunji	21	15	17

Second round
(India) A Bhatt	14	21
5	(Myanmar) Thet Htar T	21	23
(Japan) S Saito	15	24	21
(Chinese Taipei) Chiu P-c	21	22	15

Quarter-finals
5	(Myanmar) Thet Htar T	21	21
(Japan) S Saito	14	14

== Men's doubles ==
=== Seeds ===
1. (Thailand) Pharanyu Kaosamaang / Worrapol Thongsa-nga (First round)
2. (Japan) Shuntaro Mezaki / Haruya Nishida (Semi-finals)
3. (Chinese Taipei) Lin Yu-chieh / Su Li-wei (Second round)
4. (Indonesia) Sabar Karyaman Gutama / Muhammad Reza Pahlevi Isfahani (Second round)
5. (Japan) Kenya Mitsuhashi / Hiroki Okamura (Champions)
6. (Chinese Taipei) Chen Zhi-ray / Lu Chen (First round)
7. (Thailand) Tanadon Punpanich / Wachirawit Sothon (Quarter-finals)
8. (Indonesia) Hardianto / Ade Yusuf Santoso (Final)

=== Finals ===
Semi-finals
(Chinese Taipei) Chen Cheng-kuan (Chinese Taipei) Chen Sheng-fa	21	16	18
8	(Indonesia) Hardianto (Indonesia) Ade Yusuf Santoso	18	21	21
5	(Japan) Kenya Mitsuhashi (Japan) Hiroki Okamura	21	21
2	(Japan) Shuntaro Mezaki (Japan) Haruya Nishida	11	15

Final
8	(Indonesia) Hardianto (Indonesia) Ade Yusuf Santoso	19	19
5	(Japan) Kenya Mitsuhashi (Japan) Hiroki Okamura	21	21

=== Top half ===
==== Section 1 ====
First round
1	(Thailand) P Kaosamaang (Thailand) W Thongsa-nga	13	11
(Malaysia) Lau Y S (Malaysia) Lee Y B	21	21
Q4	(Chinese Taipei) Chen X-y (Chinese Taipei) Ting Y-c	21	7	21
PFQ	(Japan) K Iwano (Japan) K Tamate	16	21	17
6	(Chinese Taipei) Chen Z-r (Chinese Taipei) Lu C	13	20
(Malaysia) Boon X Y (Malaysia) Wong T C	21	22
(Thailand) W Phakjarung (Thailand) T Viriyangkura	17	13
(Chinese Taipei) Chen C-k (Chinese Taipei) Chen S-f	21	21

Second round
(Malaysia) Lau Y S (Malaysia) Lee Y B	21	13	15
Q4	(Chinese Taipei) Chen X-y (Chinese Taipei) Ting Y-c	14	21	21
(Malaysia) Boon X Y (Malaysia) Wong T C	21	11	16
(Chinese Taipei) Chen C-k (Chinese Taipei) Chen S-f	17	21	21

Quarter-finals
Q4	(Chinese Taipei) Chen X-y (Chinese Taipei) Ting Y-c	16	13
(Chinese Taipei) Chen C-k (Chinese Taipei) Chen S-f	21	21

==== Section 2 ====
First round
3	(Chinese Taipei) Lin Y-c (Chinese Taipei) Su L-w	15	21	22
(Chinese Taipei) Wei C-w (Chinese Taipei) Wu G-x	21	13	20
(Malaysia) Choong H J (Malaysia) M Haikal	21	16	19
(Chinese Taipei) Chiang C-w (Chinese Taipei) Wu H-y	19	21	21
8	(Indonesia) Hardianto (Indonesia) A Y Santoso	21	21
(India) A R Doddavarapu (India) V H V R Veeramreddy	19	15
(Chinese Taipei) Lu M-c (Chinese Taipei) Tang K-w	15	18
(Japan) T Nomura (Japan) Y Shimogami	21	21

Second round
3	(Chinese Taipei) Lin Y-c (Chinese Taipei) Su L-w	15	17
(Chinese Taipei) Chiang C-w (Chinese Taipei) Wu H-y	21	21
8	(Indonesia) Hardianto (Indonesia) A Y Santoso	21	21
(Japan) T Nomura (Japan) Y Shimogami	13	18

Quarter-finals
(Chinese Taipei) Chiang C-w (Chinese Taipei) Wu H-y	11	21	19
8	(Indonesia) Hardianto (Indonesia) A Y Santoso	21	12	21

=== Bottom half ===
==== Section 3 ====
First round
(Thailand) P Thongkham (Thailand) W Thongkham	21	15	12
(Japan) T Aizawa (Japan) Y Noda	15	21	21
Q1	(Thailand) T Kleawan (Thailand) N Viriyakit	10	9
5	(Japan) K Mitsuhashi (Japan) H Okamura	21	21
(Japan) S Ogawa (Japan) D Sano	21	21
(Vietnam) Trần T T (Vietnam) Vũ Đ L	18	8
(India) H Amsakarunan (India) R K Rethinasabapathi	21	12	10
4	(Indonesia) S K Gutama (Indonesia) M R P Isfahani	12	21	21

Second round
(Japan) T Aizawa (Japan) Y Noda	17	16
5	(Japan) K Mitsuhashi (Japan) H Okamura	21	21
(Japan) S Ogawa (Japan) D Sano	21	16	21
4	(Indonesia) S K Gutama (Indonesia) M R P Isfahani	19	21	13

Quarter-finals
5	(Japan) K Mitsuhashi (Japan) H Okamura	21	21
(Japan) S Ogawa (Japan) D Sano	17	7

==== Section 4 ====
First round
Q2	(Malaysia) K Khew (Malaysia) Wee Y H	21	21
Q3	(Chinese Taipei) Chang K-h (Chinese Taipei) Chen Y-c	14	16
(India) S Gajendran (India) M Kathiravan	13	16
7	(Thailand) T Punpanich (Thailand) W Sothon	21	21
(Malaysia) Lwi S H (Malaysia) J Wong	21	21
(Chinese Taipei) Lin B-w (Chinese Taipei) Tseng P-c	16	18
(Vietnam) Nguyễn Đ H (Vietnam) Trần Đ M	9	15
2	(Japan) S Mezaki (Japan) H Nishida	21	21

Second round
Q2	(Malaysia) K Khew (Malaysia) Wee Y H	23	16	11
7	(Thailand) T Punpanich (Thailand) W Sothon	21	21	21
(Malaysia) Lwi S H (Malaysia) J Wong	23	15
2	(Japan) S Mezaki (Japan) H Nishida	25	21

Quarter-finals
7	(Thailand) T Punpanich (Thailand) W Sothon	9	18
2	(Japan) S Mezaki (Japan) H Nishida	21	21

== Women's doubles ==
=== Seeds ===
1. (Chinese Taipei) Hsieh Pei-shan / Tseng Yu-chi (Champions)
2. (Japan) Sayaka Hobara / Yui Suizu (Second round)
3. (India) Simran Singhi / Ritika Thaker (Quarter-finals)
4. (Chinese Taipei) Cheng Yu-pei / Sun Wen-pei (Quarter-finals)
5. (Chinese Taipei) Hung En-tzu / Lin Yu-pei (Final)
6. (Chinese Taipei) Lin Chih-chun / Wu Meng-chen (First round)
7. (Thailand) Tidapron Kleebyeesun / Patchamon Laisuan (Quarter-finals)
8. (Thailand) Ornnicha Jongsathapornparn / Alisa Sapniti (Second round)

=== Finals ===
Semi-finals
1	(Chinese Taipei) Hsieh Pei-shan (Chinese Taipei) Tseng Yu-chi	21	21
(Chinese Taipei) Jiang Yi-hua (Chinese Taipei) Li Zi-qing	7	18
5	(Chinese Taipei) Hung En-tzu (Chinese Taipei) Lin Yu-pei	21	21
(Japan) Misaki Kurashima (Japan) Hina Osawa	17	11

Final
1	(Chinese Taipei) Hsieh Pei-shan (Chinese Taipei) Tseng Yu-chi	21	21
5	(Chinese Taipei) Hung En-tzu (Chinese Taipei) Lin Yu-pei	18	14

=== Top half ===
==== Section 1 ====
First round
(Chinese Taipei) Chiu P-c (Chinese Taipei) Tung C-t	13	9
(Vietnam) Phạm T D L (Vietnam) Phạm T K	21	21
8	(Thailand) O Jongsathapornparn (Thailand) A Sapniti	21	21
(Vietnam) Nguyễn T N L (Vietnam) Thân V A	13	12
(Indonesia) T Nadia (Indonesia) P Syaikah	17	23	21
(Chinese Taipei) N G Chan (Chinese Taipei) Yang C-y	21	21	18

Second round
1	(Chinese Taipei) Hsieh P-s (Chinese Taipei) Tseng Y-c	22	21
(Vietnam) Phạm T D L (Vietnam) Phạm T K	20	17
8	(Thailand) O Jongsathapornparn (Thailand) A Sapniti	17	21	13
(Indonesia) T Nadia (Indonesia) P Syaikah	21	9	21

Quarter-finals
1	(Chinese Taipei) Hsieh P-s (Chinese Taipei) Tseng Y-c	21	18	21
(Indonesia) T Nadia (Indonesia) P Syaikah	13	21	16

==== Section 2 ====
First round
(Malaysia) Lee Z Q (Malaysia) D Siow	13	23	21
(Chinese Taipei) Lin Y-y (Chinese Taipei) Tsai R-l	21	21	18
6	(Chinese Taipei) Lin C-c (Chinese Taipei) Wu M-c	14	20
(Chinese Taipei) Jiang Y-h (Chinese Taipei) Li Z-q	21	22
(Malaysia) Lee X J (Malaysia) Tan Z Y	21	21
(Vietnam) Huỳnh K M (Vietnam) Lê N V	14	10

Second round
3	(India) S Singhi (India) R Thaker	21	21
(Malaysia) Lee Z Q (Malaysia) D Siow	10	18
(Chinese Taipei) Jiang Y-h (Chinese Taipei) Li Z-q	18
(Malaysia) Lee X J (Malaysia) Tan Z Y	15^{r}

Quarter-finals
3	(India) S Singhi (India) R Thaker	21	15	15
(Chinese Taipei) Jiang Y-h (Chinese Taipei) Li Z-q	18	21	21

=== Bottom half ===
==== Section 3 ====
First round
(India) K Gupta (India) D Singh	w	/	o
(Thailand) N Kulamat (Thailand) N Laisuan
(India) P Arora (India) U Hooda
5	(Chinese Taipei) Hung E-t (Chinese Taipei) Lin Y-p	w	/	o
(Chinese Taipei) Hsu Y-h (Chinese Taipei) Lin J-y	21	21
(Malaysia) Ho L E (Malaysia) A Yap	10	15

Second round
(India) K Gupta (India) D Singh	15	13
5	(Chinese Taipei) Hung E-t (Chinese Taipei) Lin Y-p	21	21
(Chinese Taipei) Hsu Y-h (Chinese Taipei) Lin J-y	17	21	19
4	(Chinese Taipei) Cheng Y-p (Chinese Taipei) Sun W-p	21	13	21

Quarter-finals
5	(Chinese Taipei) Hung E-t (Chinese Taipei) Lin Y-p	17	21	21
4	(Chinese Taipei) Cheng Y-p (Chinese Taipei) Sun W-p	21	12	13

==== Section 4 ====
First round
(Japan) M Otake (Japan) M Takahashi	21	16	16
(Chinese Taipei) Hung H-e (Chinese Taipei) Hung Y-e	13	21	21
(Vietnam) Nguyễn H T K (Vietnam) Nguyễn T A Đ	12	7
7	(Thailand) T Kleebyeesun (Thailand) P Laisuan	21	21
(Vietnam) Nguyễn T N T (Vietnam) Vũ T T	15	17
(Japan) M Kurashima (Japan) H Osawa	21	21

Second round
(Chinese Taipei) Hung H-e (Chinese Taipei) Hung Y-e	18	22	18
7	(Thailand) T Kleebyeesun (Thailand) P Laisuan	21	20	21
(Japan) M Kurashima (Japan) H Osawa	21	17	22
2	(Japan) S Hobara (Japan) Y Suizu	13	21	20

Quarter-finals
7	(Thailand) T Kleebyeesun (Thailand) P Laisuan	15	21	18
(Japan) M Kurashima (Japan) H Osawa	21	16	21

== Mixed doubles ==
=== Seeds ===
1. (Thailand) Ruttanapak Oupthong / Jhenicha Sudjaipraparat (Final)
2. (Egypt) Adham Hatem Elgamal / Doha Hany (First round)
3. (Malaysia) Lim Tze Jian / Desiree Siow (Second round)
4. (Chinese Taipei) Lin Bing-wei / Lin Chih-chun (Semi-finals)
5. (India) Bokka Navaneeth / K. Maneesha (Second round)
6. (Indonesia) Muhammad Reza Pahlevi Isfahani / Marsheilla Gischa Islami (Quarter-finals)
7. (Thailand) Weeraphat Phakjarung / Ornnicha Jongsathapornparn (Semi-finals)
8. (Chinese Taipei) Wei Chun-wei / Nicole Gonzales Chan (Quarter-finals)

=== Finals ===
Semi-finals
1	(Thailand) Ruttanapak Oupthong (Thailand) Jhenicha Sudjaipraparat	23	21
4	(Chinese Taipei) Lin Bing-wei (Chinese Taipei) Lin Chih-chun	21	15
7	(Thailand) Weeraphat Phakjarung (Thailand) Ornnicha Jongsathapornparn	11	20
(Japan) Hiroki Nishi (Japan) Akari Sato	21	22

Final
1	(Thailand) Ruttanapak Oupthong (Thailand) Jhenicha Sudjaipraparat	21	18	14
(Japan) Hiroki Nishi (Japan) Akari Sato	15	21	21

=== Top half ===
==== Section 1 ====
First round
1	(Thailand) R Oupthong (Thailand) J Sudjaipraparat	21	21
(Chinese Taipei) Su L-w (Chinese Taipei) Lin Y-y	9	12
(Japan) Y Eto (Japan) A Kamiyama	15	18
(Chinese Taipei) Lin Y-c (Chinese Taipei) Hung Y-e	21	21
8	(Chinese Taipei) Wei C-w (Chinese Taipei) N G Chan	17	21	21
Q1	(Chinese Taipei) Chen S-f (Chinese Taipei) Lin J-y	21	19	16
(Thailand) T Viriyangkura (Thailand) A Sapniti	17	21	21
(Chinese Taipei) Lu M-c (Chinese Taipei) Hung E-t	21	19	15

Second round
1	(Thailand) R Oupthong (Thailand) J Sudjaipraparat	21	14	21
(Chinese Taipei) Lin Y-c (Chinese Taipei) Hung Y-e	13	21	9
8	(Chinese Taipei) Wei C-w (Chinese Taipei) N G Chan	21	21
(Thailand) T Viriyangkura (Thailand) A Sapniti	17	17

Quarter-finals
1	(Thailand) R Oupthong (Thailand) J Sudjaipraparat	21	21
8	(Chinese Taipei) Wei C-w (Chinese Taipei) N G Chan	14	9

==== Section 2 ====
First round
4	(Chinese Taipei) Lin B-w (Chinese Taipei) Lin C-c	21	21
(India) D Rambhiya (India) A Warang	7	11
(Vietnam) Trần L M A (Vietnam) Nguyễn H T K	12	16
Q4	(India) C Joshi (India) K Gupta	21	21
6	(Indonesia) M R P Isfahani (Indonesia) M G Islami	21	21
(Chinese Taipei) Chen Z-r (Chinese Taipei) Sun W-p	6	18
(Malaysia) O Ting (Malaysia) Gan J E	18	18
Q2	(India) S Karunakaran (India) A Variyath	21	21

Second round
4	(Chinese Taipei) Lin B-w (Chinese Taipei) Lin C-c	21	21
Q4	(India) C Joshi (India) K Gupta	11	17
6	(Indonesia) M R P Isfahani (Indonesia) M G Islami	21	21
Q2	(India) S Karunakaran (India) A Variyath	16	15

Quarter-finals
4	(Chinese Taipei) Lin B-w (Chinese Taipei) Lin C-c	19	22	21
6	(Indonesia) M R P Isfahani (Indonesia) M G Islami	21	20	12

=== Bottom half ===
==== Section 3 ====
First round
(Vietnam) Phạm V H (Vietnam) Thân V A	21	21
(Chinese Taipei) Lu C (Chinese Taipei) Cheng Y-p	14	8
(India) Kona T (India) S K P Kudaravalli	10	14
7	(Thailand) W Phakjarung (Thailand) O Jongsathapornparn	21	21
(Chinese Taipei) Wu H-y (Chinese Taipei) Yang C-y	21	21
(Australia) Teoh K C (Australia) Teoh K Q	10	8
Q3	(Chinese Taipei) Ting Y-c (Chinese Taipei) Hung H-e	21	19	11
3	(Malaysia) Lim T J (Malaysia) D Siow	17	21	21

Second round
(Vietnam) Phạm V H (Vietnam) Thân V A	7	18
7	(Thailand) W Phakjarung (Thailand) O Jongsathapornparn	21	21
(Chinese Taipei) Wu H-y (Chinese Taipei) Yang C-y	21	21
3	(Malaysia) Lim T J (Malaysia) D Siow	17	19

Quarter-finals
7	(Thailand) W Phakjarung (Thailand) O Jongsathapornparn	w	/	o
(Chinese Taipei) Wu H-y (Chinese Taipei) Yang C-y

==== Section 4 ====
First round
(Japan) H Nishi (Japan) A Sato	18	22	21
(Malaysia) Wee Y H (Malaysia) A Yap	21	20	13
(Malaysia) K Khew (Malaysia) Ho L E	20	21	15
5	(India) B Navaneeth (India) K. Maneesha	22	14	21
(Chinese Taipei) Chen C-k (Chinese Taipei) Hsu Y-h	21	21
(Chinese Taipei) Chen X-y (Chinese Taipei) Tsai R-l	8	13
(Vietnam) Trần Đ M (Vietnam) Phạm T K	21	21
2	(Egypt) A H Elgamal (Egypt) D Hany	16	18

Second round
(Japan) H Nishi (Japan) A Sato	21	21
5	(India) B Navaneeth (India) K. Maneesha	11	6
(Chinese Taipei) Chen C-k (Chinese Taipei) Hsu Y-h	21	21
(Vietnam) Trần Đ M (Vietnam) Phạm T K	15	8

Quarter-finals
(Japan) H Nishi (Japan) A Sato	21	18	21
(Chinese Taipei) Chen C-k (Chinese Taipei) Hsu Y-h	9	21	12

Preceded by 2022 Vietnam Open	Vietnam Open	Succeeded by 2024 Vietnam Open
Preceded by 2023 China Open; 2023 Indonesia Masters Super 100 I	BWF World Tour; 2023 BWF season	Succeeded by 2023 Kaohsiung Masters
