= Takuma Obayashi =

Japanese badminton player

Takuma Ōbayashi
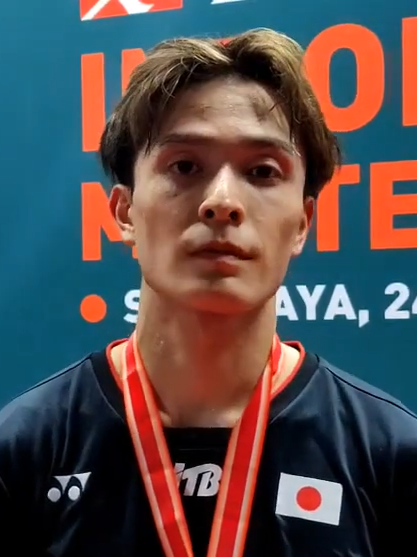
- Obayashi in 2023

Personal information
- Born: 7 August 1999 (age 27) Katsuyama, Fukui, Japan
- Height: 1.69 m (5 ft 7 in)
- Weight: 68 kg (150 lb)

Sport
- Country: Japan
- Sport: Badminton
- Handedness: Right

Men's singles
- Career record: 132 wins, 71 losses (65.02%)
- Highest ranking: 30 (20 February 2024)
- BWF profile
Medal record
Men's badminton
Representing Japan
Asia Team Championships
Bronze medal – third place	2024 Selangor	Men's team
World Junior Championships
Bronze medal – third place	2017 Yogyakarta	Mixed team
Asian Junior Championships
Bronze medal – third place	2016 Bangkok	Mixed team
Bronze medal – third place	2017 Jakarta	Mixed team

Takuma Obayashi (大林拓真, Ōbayashi Takuma; born 7 August 1999) is a Japanese badminton player affiliated with Tonami. He won his first BWF World Tour title at the 2023 Indonesia Masters Super 100 II.

== Career ==
Obayashi made his international senior debut at the Vietnam International Challenge in 2018, and participated in his first BWF World Tour tournament, the Canada Open, later that year. He reached the finals of a senior international tournament for the first time at the Osaka International in 2019, finishing runner-up to countryman and former Saitama Sakae High School teammate Koki Watanabe. Obayashi would go on to win his first international title the following year at the Jamaica International.

Obayashi won his first BWF World Tour title at the Indonesia Masters Super 100 II in 2023. That year, he also reached the finals at the Vietnam Open and won two more International Challenge-level tournaments, including the inaugural Saipan International after winning the final against top-seeded Jeon Hyeok-jin. Obayashi later achieved notoriety for his upset victory over Anders Antonsen when making his Super 500-level debut at the 2023 Japan Masters, where he ultimately reached the semifinals before losing to world no. 1 Viktor Axelsen.

== Achievements ==
=== BWF World Tour (1 title, 2 runners-up) ===
The BWF World Tour, which was announced on 19 March 2017 and implemented in 2018, is a series of elite badminton tournaments sanctioned by the Badminton World Federation (BWF). The BWF World Tour is divided into levels of World Tour Finals, Super 1000, Super 750, Super 500, Super 300, and the BWF Tour Super 100.

Men's singles
Year	Tournament	Level	Opponent	Score	Result	Ref.
2022	Canada Open	Super 100	(France) Alex Lanier	12–21, 21–12, 13–21	(silver) Runner-up	
2023	Vietnam Open	Super 100	(Chinese Taipei) Huang Yu-kai	13–21, 13–17	(silver) Runner-up	
2023	Indonesia Masters	Super 100	(South Korea) Choi Ji-hoon	21–8, 21–19	(gold) Winner	

=== BWF International Challenge/Series (4 titles, 2 runners-up) ===
Men's singles
Year	Tournament	Opponent	Score	Result	Ref.
2019	Osaka International	(Japan) Koki Watanabe	21–19, 17–21, 7–21	(silver) Runner-up	
2020	Jamaica International	(Japan) Yushi Tanaka	21–11, 17–21, 21–12	(gold) Winner	
2020	Peru Future Series	(Japan) Yushi Tanaka	13–21, 21–8, 18–21	(silver) Runner-up	
2022	Canadian International	(Canada) Brian Yang	21–11, 21–17	(gold) Winner	
2023	Vietnam International	(Vietnam) Lê Đức Phát	21–14, 21–15	(gold) Winner	
2023	Saipan International	(South Korea) Jeon Hyeok-jin	21–19, 21–16	(gold) Winner	

BWF International Challenge tournament
BWF International Series tournament
BWF Future Series tournament

=== BWF Junior International (1 title, 1 runner-up) ===
Boys' doubles
Year	Tournament	Partner	Opponent	Score	Result	Ref.
2017	German Junior	(Japan) Hikaru Minegishi	(Japan) Mahiro Kaneko (Japan) Yunosuke Kubota	15–21, 18–21	(silver) Runner-up	

Mixed doubles
Year	Tournament	Partner	Opponent	Score	Result	Ref.
2017	India Junior International	(Japan) Natsu Saito	(Indonesia) Rinov Rivaldy (Indonesia) Angelica Wiratama	18–21, 21–16, 21–17	(gold) Winner	

BWF Junior International Grand Prix tournament

== Performance timeline ==
Key

W	Won	F	Finalist	SF	Semi-finalist
QF	Quarter-finalist	#R	Rounds 4, 3, 2, 1	RR	Round-robin stage
Q#	Qualification round	A	Absent	w/d	Withdrew
G	Gold	S	Silver	B	Bronze
NH	Not held	N/A	Not applicable	DNQ	Did not qualify

=== National team ===
- Junior level

Team events	2016	2017
Asian Junior Championships	B	B
World Junior Championships	A	B

- Senior level

Team events	2024
Asia Team Championships	B

=== Individual competitions ===
- Junior level

Events	2016	2017
Asian Junior Championships	3R	A
World Junior Championships	A	QF

- Senior level

Tournament	BWF World Tour									Best	Ref
Tournament	2018	2019	2020	2021	2022	2023	2024	2025	2026	Best	Ref
India Open	A		NH		A		2R	1R	A	2R ('24)	
Indonesia Masters	A							1R	A	1R ('25)	
Thailand Masters	A			NH		A	QF	A		QF ('24)	
German Open	A		NH		A			1R	A	1R ('25)	
Swiss Open	A		NH	A			1R	A		1R ('24)	
Orléans Masters	A		NH	A			QF	2R	Q2	QF ('24)	
Thailand Open	A			NH	A		1R	1R	A	1R ('24, '25)	
Malaysia Masters	A			NH	A		1R	A		1R ('24)	
U.S. Open	A		NH			QF	2R	A		QF ('23)	
Canada Open	3R	A	NH		F	A	2R	1R	A	F ('22)	
Japan Open	A		NH		A		1R	A		1R ('24)	
China Open	A		NH			A	1R	A		1R ('24)	
Taipei Open	A		NH		A			1R	A	1R ('25)	
Korea Masters	A		NH		A	2R	QF	1R	A	QF ('24)	
China Masters	A	NH			A		2R	A		2R ('24)	
Indonesia Masters Super 100	A	3R	NH		A	3R	A	2R	A	W ('23)	
Indonesia Masters Super 100	A	3R	NH		A	W	A	2R	A	W ('23)	
Vietnam Open	A	2R	NH		A	F	A	2R	A	F ('23)	
Arctic Open	A		NH			A	1R	2R	A	2R ('25)	
Denmark Open	A						2R	A		2R ('24)	
Malaysia Super 100	N/A					A		3R	A	3R ('25)	
Korea Open	A		NH		A		2R	A		2R ('24)	
Japan Masters	N/A					SF	1R	1R	A	SF ('23)	
Kaohsiung Masters	N/A					3R	A			3R ('23)	
Hong Kong Open	A		NH			A	2R	A		2R ('24)	
Akita Masters	1R	QF	NH			N/A				QF ('19)	
Spain Masters	A				NH	A	1R	NH		1R ('24)	
Year-end ranking	186	141	105	124	117	34	36	77		30	
Tournament	2018	2019	2020	2021	2022	2023	2024	2025	2026	Best	Ref

== Record against selected opponents ==
Record against Year-end Finals finalists, World Championships semi-finalists, and Olympic quarter-finalists. Accurate as of 15 May 2025.

Player	M	W	L	Diff.
(Canada) Victor Lai	1	1	0	+1
(Chinese Taipei) Chou Tien-chen	2	0	2	–2
(Denmark) Anders Antonsen	3	1	2	–1
(Denmark) Viktor Axelsen	1	0	1	–1
(France) Alex Lanier	3	1	2	–1
(India) Lakshya Sen	2	0	2	–2

Player	M	W	L	Diff.
(Indonesia) Tommy Sugiarto	1	1	0	+1
(Japan) Kodai Naraoka	4	0	4	–4
(Singapore) Loh Kean Yew	1	0	1	–1
(Thailand) Kunlavut Vitidsarn	3	1	2	–1
(Thailand) Kantaphon Wangcharoen	3	3	0	+3
