= Akari Sato =

Japanese badminton player (born 2001)

Akari Satō
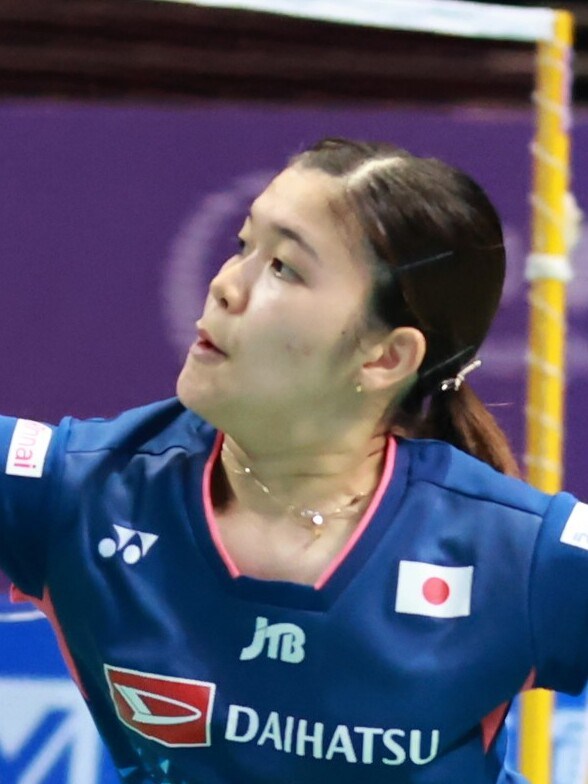
- Sato in 2023

Personal information
- Born: 31 March 2001 (age 25) Saitama Prefecture, Japan
- Height: 1.66 m (5 ft 5 in)

Sport
- Country: Japan
- Sport: Badminton
- Handedness: Right
- Coached by: Norio Imai

Women's & mixed doubles
- Career record: XD 46 wins, 23 losses (69.23%); WD 24 wins, 8 losses (75.00%)
- Highest ranking: 30 (XD with Hiroki Nishi, 27 August 2024); 106 (WD with Hina Osawa, 2 September 2025)
- BWF profile
Medal record
Women's badminton
Representing Japan
Asia Mixed Team Championships
Bronze medal – third place	2025 Qingdao	Mixed team

Akari Sato (佐藤 灯, Satō Akari; born 31 March 2001) is a Japanese badminton player from Saitama Prefecture. She was a member of the Japan national team and affiliated with ACT Saikyo. Sato won two Super 100 titles: the Vietnam Open and the Kaohsiung Masters.

== Early career ==
Akari Sato began her badminton training at Hatokaya Wings, a junior club in Kawaguchi, Saitama Prefecture. She attended Kasukabe Municipal Takesato Junior High School and Eimei High School before enrolling at Ryukoku University in April 2019. During her time at university, she partnered with Rio Uemura to win the All Japan Intercollegiate Championships in women's doubles in consecutive years, 2021 and 2022. In 2022, she also teamed up with university teammate Hiroki Nishi, who was two years her junior, securing third place in the mixed doubles at the All Japan Badminton Championships. This performance led to their selection for the 2023 Japan National Team (B Team), coached by Lee Wan Wah. This selection marked the first time a student-athlete from the Ryukoku University Badminton Club was chosen for the national team.

== Career ==
=== 2023 ===
Following her graduation from Ryukoku University in March, Sato initially joined the Resonac badminton team in April, before transferring to the ACT Saikyo team in July of the same year. In her first year on the national team, Sato and Nishi won three mixed doubles titles. They secured their first World Tour title at the Super 100 Vietnam Open, defeating Thailand's Ruttanapak Oupthong and Jhenicha Sudjaipraparat. They then went on to win the Super 100 Kaohsiung Masters, overcoming the top-seeded Indonesian duo of Dejan Ferdinansyah and Gloria Emanuelle Widjaja, and triumphed at the Indonesia International. The pair also finished second in the Indonesia Masters Super 100.

=== 2024 ===
In 2024, Sato and Nishi won their sole mixed doubles title at the Saipan International, defeating compatriots Yuichi Shimogami and Sayaka Hobara in the final. They also reached the final of the All Japan Badminton Championships, where a foot injury to Sato forced their withdrawal, resulting in a runner-up finish. Partnering with Maya Taguchi in women's doubles, Sato reached the semifinals of the Luxembourg Open and the Saipan International.

=== 2025 ===
Sato was selected for the 2025 Japan National Team in mixed doubles with Nishi. She represented Japan at the Asia Mixed Team Championships in February, where the team earned a bronze medal. Sato also made her debut at the Asian Championships with Nishi, reached the first round after winning their initial round-robin matches. In May, Sato and Nishi secured their first national title together, winning the mixed doubles event at the Japan Ranking Circuit by defeating Olympic medalist Yuta Watanabe and Misaki Matsutomo in the final. In the women’s doubles, Sato reunited with Hina Osawa, and together they won three titles: the Sri Lanka International Series, the Sri Lanka International Challenge, and the Vietnam International. However, on 1 July 2025, ACT Saikyo announced Sato's retirement from professional badminton. Concurrently, the Nippon Badminton Association announced her resignation from the 2025 Japan national team.

=== 2026 ===
Sato returned to competitive badminton in 2026, joining the Cheerful Tottori badminton club. Partnering with Arisa Ishida, Sato won the women's doubles title at the Sydney International.

== Achievements ==
=== BWF World Tour (2 titles, 1 runner-up) ===
The BWF World Tour, which was announced on 19 March 2017 and implemented in 2018, is a series of elite badminton tournaments sanctioned by the Badminton World Federation (BWF). The BWF World Tour is divided into levels of World Tour Finals, Super 1000, Super 750, Super 500, Super 300, and the BWF Tour Super 100.

Mixed doubles
Year	Tournament	Level	Partner	Opponent	Score	Result
2023 (I)	Indonesia Masters	Super 100	(Japan) Hiroki Nishi	(Malaysia) Yap Roy King (Malaysia) Valeree Siow	21–13, 14–21, 14–21	(silver) Runner-up
2023	Vietnam Open	Super 100	(Japan) Hiroki Nishi	(Thailand) Ruttanapak Oupthong (Thailand) Jhenicha Sudjaipraparat	15–21, 21–18, 21–14	(gold) Winner
2023	Kaohsiung Masters	Super 100	(Japan) Hiroki Nishi	(Indonesia) Dejan Ferdinansyah (Indonesia) Gloria Emanuelle Widjaja	22–20, 12–21, 21–14	(gold) Winner

=== BWF International Challenge/Series (6 titles) ===
Women's doubles
Year	Tournament	Partner	Opponent	Score	Result
2025	Sri Lanka International	(Japan) Hina Osawa	(Thailand) Tidapron Kleebyeesun (Thailand) Nattamon Laisuan	22–20, 15–21, 21–15	(gold) Winner
2025	Sri Lanka International	(Japan) Hina Osawa	(South Korea) Kim Min-ji (South Korea) Kim Yu-jung	21–19, 17–21, 21–13	(gold) Winner
2025	Vietnam International	(Japan) Hina Osawa	(Chinese Taipei) Hsu Ya-ching (Chinese Taipei) Sung Yu-hsuan	21–13, 21–12	(gold) Winner
2026	Sydney International	(Japan) Arisa Ishida	(Japan) Sora Hatakeyama (Japan) Yumi Tanabe	21–14, 21–10	(gold) Winner

Mixed doubles
Year	Tournament	Partner	Opponent	Score	Result
2023 (II)	Indonesia International	(Japan) Hiroki Nishi	(Malaysia) Choong Hon Jian (Malaysia) Go Pei Kee	22–20, 18–21, 21–14	(gold) Winner
2024	Saipan International	(Japan) Hiroki Nishi	(Japan) Yuichi Shimogami (Japan) Sayaka Hobara	21–11, 21–10	(gold) Winner

BWF International Challenge tournament
BWF International Series tournament

== Record against selected opponents ==
Record against year-end Finals finalists, World Championships semi-finalists, and Olympic quarter-finalists. Accurate as of 18 October 2026.

=== Hiroki Nishi ===
Players	M	W	L	Diff.
(China) Jiang Zhenbang & Wei Yaxin	1	0	1	–1
(Indonesia) Amri Syahnawi & Nita Violina Marwah	2	0	2	–2
(South Korea) Kim Won-ho & Jeong Na-eun	1	0	1	–1

=== Maya Taguchi ===
Players	M	W	L	Diff.
(India) Treesa Jolly & Gayatri Gopichand	1	0	1	–1
