= Huang Yu-kai =

Taiwanese badminton player (born 2002)

Huang Yu-kai 黃郁豈
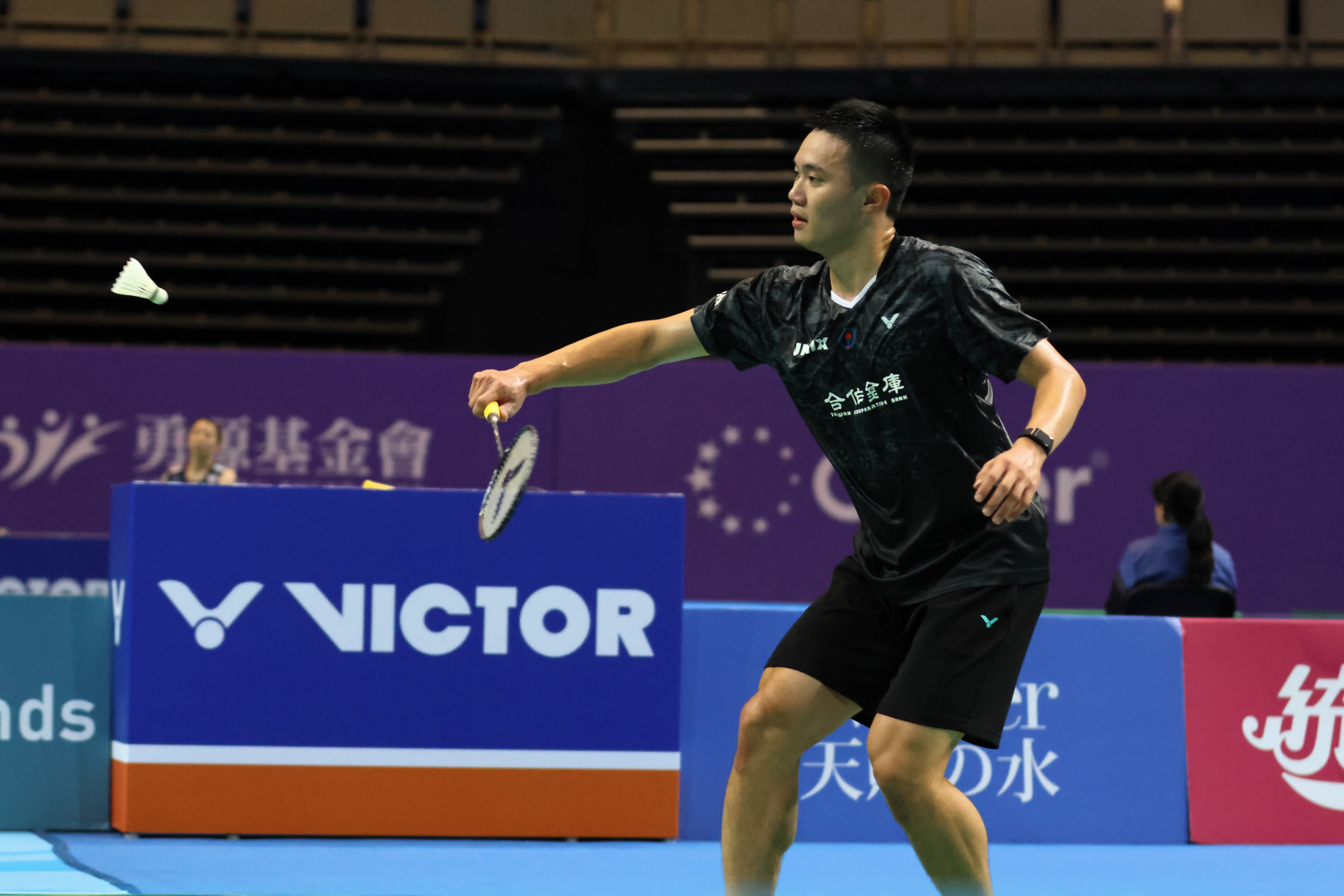
- Huang at the 2023 Kaohsiung Masters

Personal information
- Born: 7 October 2002 (age 24) Taichung, Taiwan
- Height: 1.67 m (5 ft 6 in)

Sport
- Country: Republic of China (Taiwan)
- Sport: Badminton
- Handedness: Right

Men's singles
- Highest ranking: 49 (3 October 2023)
- Current ranking: 69 (12 November 2024)
- BWF profile

Huang Yu-kai (Chinese: 黃郁豈; pinyin: Huáng Yùkǎi; born 7 October 2002) is a Taiwanese badminton player. He finished his education at Taipei Municipal Song Shan Senior High School and is a student at the National Taiwan University of Sport.

== Achievements ==
=== BWF World Tour (1 title) ===
The BWF World Tour, which was announced on 19 March 2017 and implemented in 2018, is a series of elite badminton tournaments sanctioned by the Badminton World Federation (BWF). The BWF World Tour is divided into levels of World Tour Finals, Super 1000, Super 750, Super 500, Super 300, and the BWF Tour Super 100.

Men's singles
Year	Tournament	Level	Opponent	Score	Result	Ref.
2023	Vietnam Open	Super 100	(Japan) Takuma Obayashi	21–13, 21–17	(gold) Winner	

=== BWF International Challenge/Series (1 title, 3 runners-up) ===
Men's singles
Year	Tournament	Opponent	Score	Result
2022	Czech Open	(Denmark) Victor Svendsen	18–21, 17–21	(silver) Runner-up
2023	Austrian Open	(Belgium) Julien Carraggi	19–21, 10–21	(silver) Runner-up
2023	Denmark Masters	(Netherlands) Mark Caljouw	21–18, 21–13	(gold) Winner
2023	Réunion Open	(France) Arnaud Merkle	19–21, 19–21	(silver) Runner-up

BWF International Challenge tournament
BWF International Series tournament
BWF Future Series tournament
