= Hung En-tzu =

Taiwanese badminton player (born 2001)

Hung En-tzu 洪恩慈
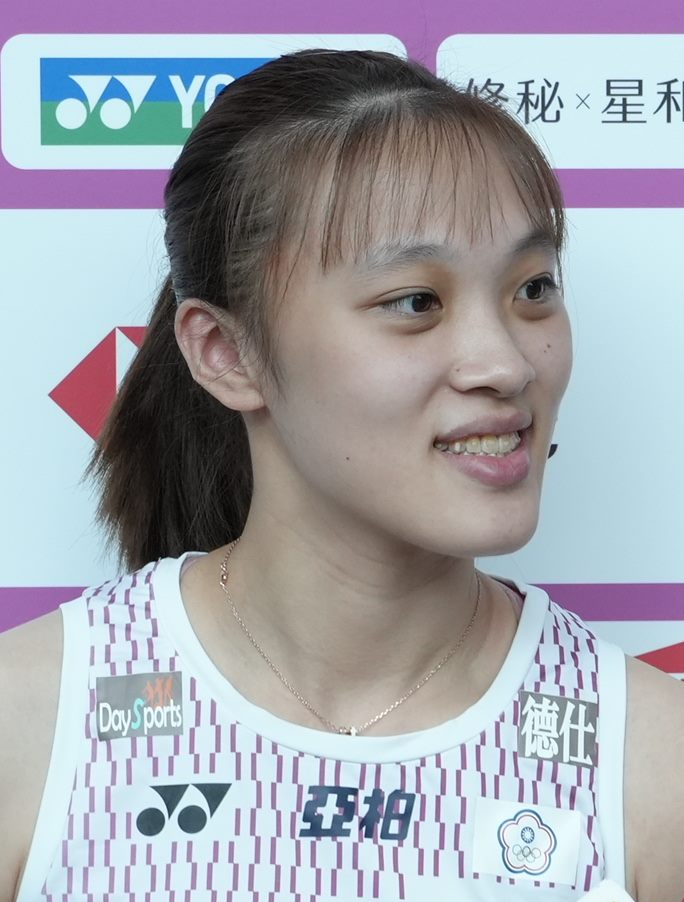
- Hung in 2026

Personal information
- Born: 6 July 2001 (age 25) Taiwan
- Height: 175 cm (5 ft 9 in)

Sport
- Country: Republic of China (Taiwan)
- Sport: Badminton
- Handedness: Left

Women's & mixed doubles
- Highest ranking: 8 (WD with Hsieh Pei-shan, 10 March 2026); 26 (XD with Lu Ming-che, 8 April 2025)
- Current ranking: 12 (WD with Hsieh Pei-shan, 17 November 2026)
- BWF profile

Hung En-tzu (Chinese: 洪恩慈; pinyin: Hóng Ēncí; born 6 July 2001) is a Taiwanese badminton player. Partnering with Hsieh Pei-shan, Hung achieved a career-high world ranking of No. 12 on 13 May 2025. Their victory at the 2025 Taipei Open Super 300 tournament was particularly notable; it ended Chinese Taipei’s 17-year wait for a women’s doubles crown at their home event and emulated the 2008 victory of their high school coach, Chien Yu-chin.

== Career ==
Hung first grasp of senior international badminton come at Sydney International in 2017 where she manage to win in both women's singles and women's doubles category.

In 2023, Hung focusing mostly on doubles performance and manage a final appearances in Nantes International and Vietnam Open respectively. In 2024, Hung paired with Hsieh Pei-shan, a senior who is 4 years older than her and win the very first BWF World Tour in 2024 Indonesia Masters Super 100. Hung and Hsieh won their first Super 300 tournament on their homeground Taipei Open in 2025, beating Japanese young doubles of Miyu Takahashi and Mizuki Otake in straight games. In the same year, they also won Macau Open against another Japanese young pair of Kaho Osawa and Mai Tanabe.

== Achievements ==
=== BWF World Tour (3 titles, 2 runners-up) ===
The BWF World Tour, which was announced on 19 March 2017 and implemented in 2018, is a series of elite badminton tournaments sanctioned by the Badminton World Federation (BWF). The BWF World Tours are divided into levels of World Tour Finals, Super 1000, Super 750, Super 500, Super 300 (part of the HSBC World Tour), and the BWF Tour Super 100.

Women's doubles
Year	Tournament	Level	Partner	Opponent	Score	Result	Ref.
2023	Vietnam Open	Super 100	(Chinese Taipei) Lin Yu-pei	(Chinese Taipei) Hsieh Pei-shan (Chinese Taipei) Tseng Yu-chi	18–21, 14–21	(silver) Runner-up	
2024	Macau Open	Super 300	(Chinese Taipei) Hsieh Pei-shan	(China) Li Wenmei (China) Zhang Shuxian	23–25, 21–18, 20–22	(silver) Runner-up	
2024 (II)	Indonesia Masters	Super 100	(Chinese Taipei) Hsieh Pei-shan	(Indonesia) Lanny Tria Mayasari (Indonesia) Siti Fadia Silva Ramadhanti	21–19, 21–15	(gold) Winner	
2025	Taipei Open	Super 300	(Chinese Taipei) Hsieh Pei-shan	(Japan) Mizuki Otake (Japan) Miyu Takahashi	21–14, 21–15	(gold) Winner	
2025	Macau Open	Super 300	(Chinese Taipei) Hsieh Pei-shan	(Japan) Kaho Osawa (Japan) Mai Tanabe	21–18, 21–12	(gold) Winner	

=== BWF International Challenges/Series (2 titles, 2 runners-up) ===
Women's singles
Year	Tournament	Opponent	Score	Result	Ref.
2017	Sydney International	(Chinese Taipei) Hsieh Yu-ying	17–21, 21–18, 22–20	(gold) Winner	
2019	Portugal International	(Thailand) Porntip Buranaprasertsuk	12–21, 21–19, 11–21	(silver) Runner-up	

Women's doubles
Year	Tournament	Partner	Opponent	Score	Result	Ref.
2017	Sydney International	(Chinese Taipei) Lin Jhih-yun	(Australia) Hsuan-Yu Wendy Chen (Australia) Sylvina Kurniawan	21–19, 21–19	(gold) Winner	
2023	Nantes International	(Chinese Taipei) Lin Yu-pei	(India) Tanisha Crasto (India) Ashwini Ponnappa	15–21, 14–21	(silver) Runner-up	

BWF International Challenge tournament
BWF International Series tournament
BWF Future Series tournament
