= Hsieh Pei-shan =

Taiwanese badminton player (born 1997)

Hsieh Pei-shan 謝沛珊
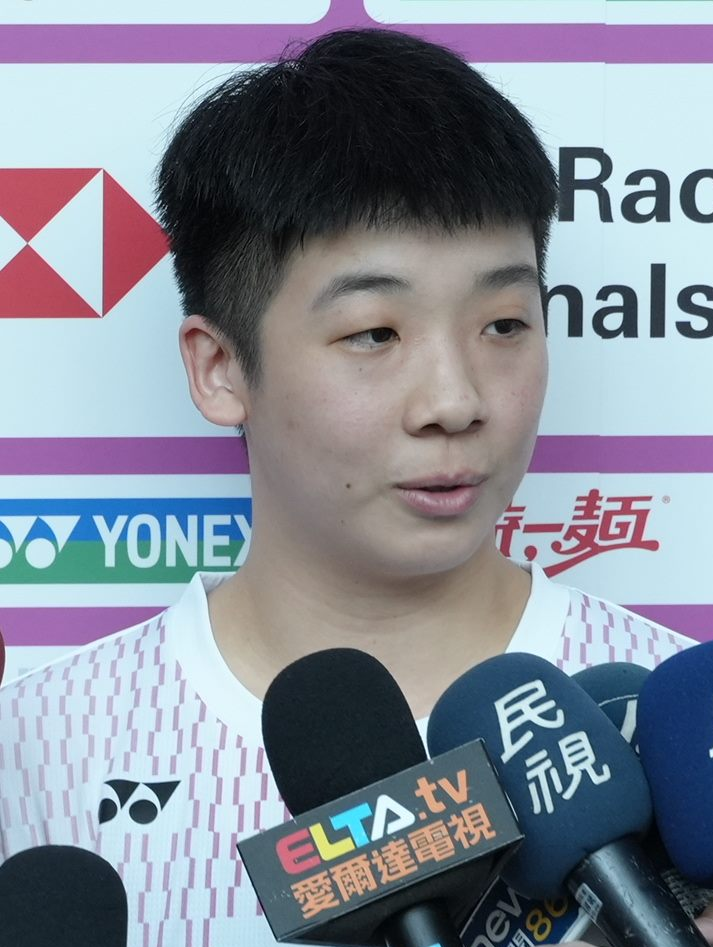
- Hsieh in 2025

Personal information
- Born: 22 November 1997 (age 28) Pingtung City, Taiwan

Sport
- Country: Republic of China (Taiwan)
- Sport: Badminton
- Handedness: Right

Women's doubles
- Highest ranking: 8 (with Hung En-tzu, 10 March 2026)
- Current ranking: 12 (with Hung En-tzu, 17 November 2026)
- BWF profile
Medal record
Women's badminton
Representing Chinese Taipei

Hsieh Pei-shan (Chinese: 謝沛珊; pinyin: Xiè Pèishān; born 22 November 1997) is a Taiwanese badminton player. Partnering with Hung En-tzu, Hsieh achieved a career-high world ranking of No. 12 on 13 May 2025. Their victory at the 2025 Taipei Open Super 300 tournament was particularly notable; it ended Chinese Taipei’s 17-year wait for a women’s doubles crown at their home event and emulated the 2008 victory of their high school coach, Chien Yu-chin.

== Achievements ==
=== BWF World Tour (4 titles, 1 runner-up) ===
The BWF World Tour, which was announced on 19 March 2017 and implemented in 2018, is a series of elite badminton tournaments sanctioned by the Badminton World Federation (BWF). The BWF World Tours are divided into levels of World Tour Finals, Super 1000, Super 750, Super 500, Super 300 (part of the HSBC World Tour), and the BWF Tour Super 100.

Women's doubles
Year	Tournament	Level	Partner	Opponent	Score	Result	Ref.
2023	Vietnam Open	Super 100	(Chinese Taipei) Tseng Yu-chi	(Chinese Taipei) Hung En-tzu (Chinese Taipei) Lin Yu-pei	21–18, 21–14	(gold) Winner	
2024	Macau Open	Super 300	(Chinese Taipei) Hung En-tzu	(China) Li Wenmei (China) Zhang Shuxian	23–25, 21–18, 20–22	(silver) Runner-up	
2024 (II)	Indonesia Masters	Super 100	(Chinese Taipei) Hung En-tzu	(Indonesia) Lanny Tria Mayasari (Indonesia) Siti Fadia Silva Ramadhanti	21–19, 21–15	(gold) Winner	
2025	Taipei Open	Super 300	(Chinese Taipei) Hung En-tzu	(Japan) Mizuki Otake (Japan) Miyu Takahashi	21–14, 21–15	(gold) Winner	
2025	Macau Open	Super 300	(Chinese Taipei) Hung En-tzu	(Japan) Kaho Osawa (Japan) Mai Tanabe	21–18, 21–12	(gold) Winner	
