= Chiu Pin-chian =

Taiwanese badminton player

Chiu Pin-chian 邱品蒨
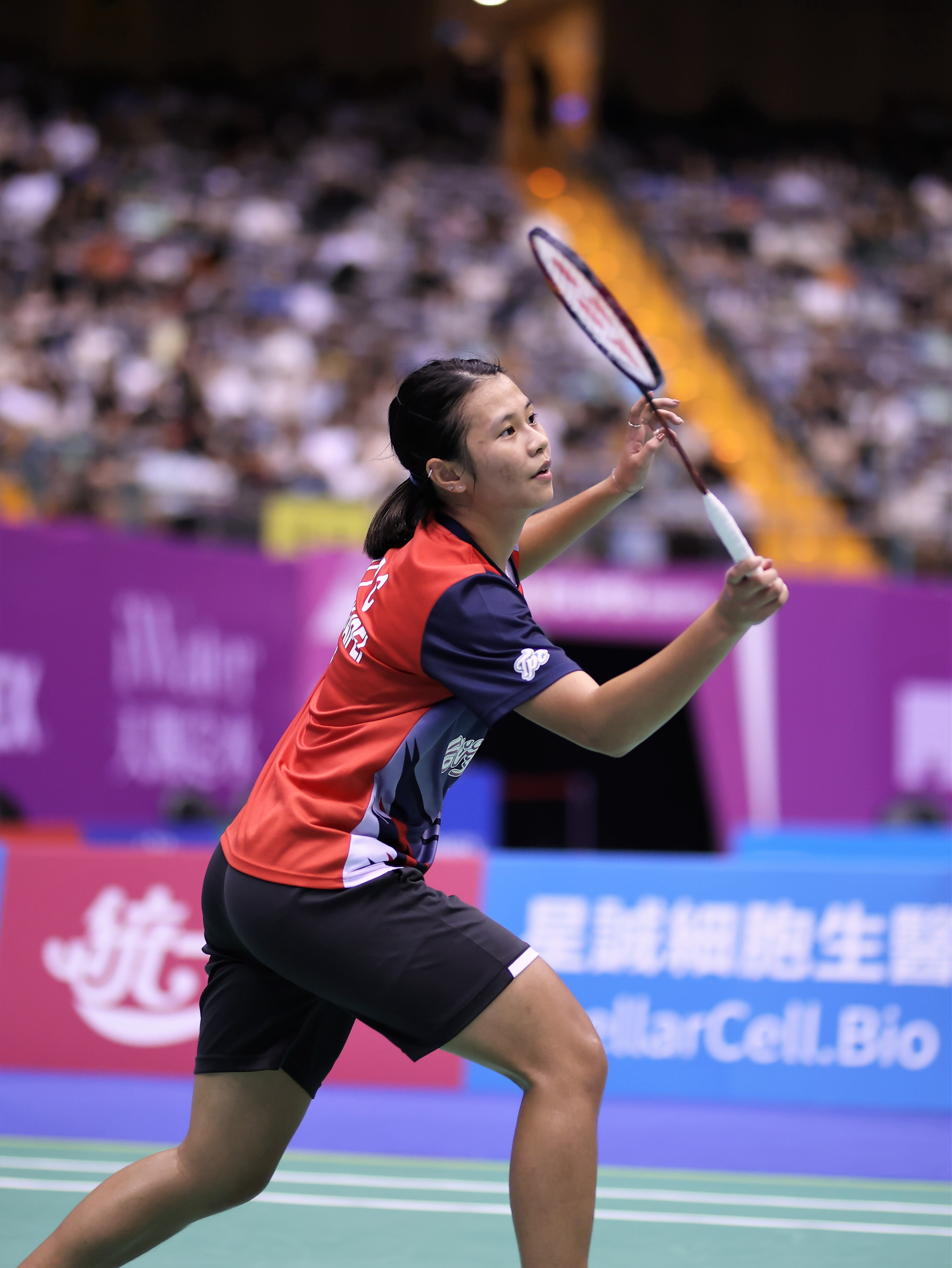
- Chiu at the 2024 Taipei Open

Personal information
- Born: 15 May 1999 (age 27) Kaohsiung City, Taiwan
- Height: 1.64 m (5 ft 5 in)

Sport
- Country: Republic of China (Taiwan)
- Sport: Badminton
- Handedness: Right

Women's singles
- Highest ranking: 11 (9 June 2026)
- Current ranking: 20 (10 November 2026)
- BWF profile
Medal record
Women's badminton
Representing Chinese Taipei
Asia Team Championships
Bronze medal – third place	2026 Qingdao	Women's team

Chiu Pin-chian (Chinese: 邱品蒨; pinyin: Chīu Pǐnchìan; born 15 May 1999) is a badminton player from Taiwan, representing Chinese Taipei.

== Career ==
Chiu was born and raised in Kaohsiung, Taiwan. She joined the badminton team at Mincyuan Elementary School in Kaohsiung during her elementary school years, and later attended Guochang Junior High School, Tsoying Senior High School, and the National Taiwan Sport University. In 2017, she finished as the runner-up in the Women's singles Division B at the second National Ranking Tournament, earning qualification as a Division A player. In 2018, she joined the Taiwan Power Company Women's Badminton Team.

In May 2022, Chiu won the gold medal in the women's singles event at the National Intercollegiate Athletic Games. In October, she reached the semi-finals of both the women's singles and doubles events at the Sydney International. The following month, she advanced to her first international tournament final at the Malaysia International Series after defeating Chinese player Chen Lu in the women's singles semi-finals. In the final, however, she lost 10–21, 16–21 to another Chinese player, Gao Fangjie.

In September 2023, Chiu defeated Japanese rising star Tomoka Miyazaki in the women's singles semi-finals of the Indonesia Masters Super 100 I, reaching her first final on the BWF World Tour. She ultimately finished runner-up after losing 15–21, 19–21 to Indonesian player Ester Nurumi Tri Wardoyo. Two weeks later, she reached the semi-finals of the Kaohsiung Masters, where she was defeated by Japan's Riko Gunji.

=== 2024: First National Ranking Title and Taipei Open Semi-finalist ===
In March 2024, Chiu advanced to the final of the Ruichang China Masters for the second time in her career after defeating Dai Wang in the semi-finals. She was again denied her maiden title, losing to Kaoru Sugiyama in three games, 14–21, 21–14, 13–21.

In August, Chiu captured her first-ever National Ranking Tournament title at the second National Ranking Tournament of the year. As a result, she earned her first call-up to the national team training squad in September.

Later that month, shortly after joining the national team, she competed in the Taipei Open. She defeated Sung Shuo-yun and Lauren Lam before staging a comeback victory over Japan's Natsuki Nidaira in the quarter-finals, winning 15–21, 21–19, 21–16. She became the only local women's singles player to reach the semi-finals. In the semi-final match, Chiu won the opening game 21–16 against Indonesian player Putri Kusuma Wardani but was eventually defeated 16–21, 11–21 in the next two games.

=== 2025: First BWF World Tour Title ===
In November 2025, Chiu claimed her first BWF World Tour title at the Korea Masters. On her way to the championship, she defeated Goh Jin Wei, Tonrug Saeheng, and Asuka Takahashi. In the semi-finals, she came from behind to beat Indonesian youngster Ni Kadek Dhinda Amartya Pratiwi 19–21, 21–19, 21–8. She then defeated Vietnam's Nguyễn Thùy Linh 21–16, 21–15 in the final, becoming the first Taiwanese women's singles player since Tai Tzu-ying to win a Super 300-level title.

== Achievements ==
=== BWF World Tour (1 title, 2 runners-up) ===
The BWF World Tour, which was announced on 19 March 2017 and implemented in 2018, is a series of elite badminton tournaments sanctioned by the Badminton World Federation (BWF). The BWF World Tour is divided into levels of World Tour Finals, Super 1000, Super 750, Super 500, Super 300, and the BWF Tour Super 100.

Women's singles
Year	Tournament	Level	Opponent	Score	Result
2023	Indonesia Masters Super 100 I	Super 100	(Indonesia) Ester Nurumi Tri Wardoyo	15–21, 19–21	(silver) Runner-up
2024	Ruichang China Masters	Super 100	(Japan) Kaoru Sugiyama	14–21, 21–14, 13–21	(silver) Runner-up
2025	Korea Masters	Super 300	(Vietnam) Nguyễn Thùy Linh	21–16, 21–15	(gold) Winner

=== BWF International Challenge/Series (1 runner-up) ===
Women's singles
Year	Tournament	Opponent	Score	Result
2022	Malaysia International	(China) Gao Fangjie	10–21, 16–21	(silver) Runner-up

BWF International Series tournament
