= Lim Chong King =

Malaysian badminton player

Lim Chong King 林忠庆
Personal information
- Born: 6 May 2000 (age 26) Kuala Lumpur, Malaysia
- Years active: 2018–present

Sport
- Country: Malaysia
- Sport: Badminton
- Handedness: Right

Men's singles
- Highest ranking: 141 (29 March 2022)
- BWF profile
Medal record
Men's badminton
Representing Malaysia
Asia Team Championships
Gold medal – first place	2022 Selangor	Men's team
SEA Games
Silver medal – second place	2019 Philippines	Men's team
Silver medal – second place	2021 Vietnam	Men's team
Asian Junior Championships
Bronze medal – third place	2018 Jakarta	Mixed team

Lim Chong King (Chinese: 林忠慶; pinyin: Lín Zhōngqìng; born 6 May 2000) is a Malaysian badminton player. He won his first senior title in 2019 at the Hellas Open.

== Career ==
Exposed to badminton at the age of seven, Lim was selected for the badminton team of Bukit Jalil Sports School.

=== 2016–2018: Junior career ===
In 2016, Lim won the boys' singles U-17 title at the Korea Junior International. He joined the national team at 18. He was also part of Malaysia's mixed team that won bronze at the 2018 Badminton Asia Junior Championships.

=== 2019 ===
In August, Lim competed at the Hellas Open where he won his first international title by defeating compatriot Aidil Sholeh with the score of 8–21, 21–13, 21–15. In September, he lost the Sydney International tournament to Japan's Yusuke Onodera. In December, he made his debut at the 2019 SEA Games where he helped Malaysia win silver in the men's team event.

=== 2022 ===
Lim was a part of the first Malaysian men's team to win the gold medal at the 2022 Badminton Asia Team Championships in February. In March, he reached the semi-final of Polish Open but lost out to Lee Chia-hao in three games. In May, he competed at the 2021 SEA Games and won silver in the men's team event. At the end of the year, Lim was dropped from the national team.

== Achievements ==
=== BWF International Challenge/Series (1 title, 1 runner-up) ===
Men's singles
Year	Tournament	Opponent	Score	Result
2019	Hellas Open	(Malaysia) Aidil Sholeh	8–21, 21–13, 21–15	(gold) Winner
2019	Sydney International	(Japan) Yusuke Onodera	8–21, 15–21	(silver) Runner-up

BWF International Challenge tournament
BWF International Series tournament
BWF Future Series tournament
