= Lin Bing-wei =

Taiwanese badminton player (born 1999)

Lin Bing-wei 林秉緯
Personal information
- Born: 7 September 1999 (age 27) Taiwan

Sport
- Country: Republic of China (Taiwan)
- Sport: Badminton
- Handedness: Left

Men's & mixed doubles
- Highest ranking: 27 (MD with Su Ching-heng, 19 November 2024); 47 (XD with Lin Chih-chun, 10 December 2024)
- BWF profile

Lin Bing-wei (traditional Chinese: 林秉緯; simplified Chinese: 林秉纬; pinyin: Lín Bǐngwěi; born 7 September 1999) is a Taiwanese badminton player.

== Achievements ==
=== BWF World Tour (1 title, 1 runner-up) ===
The BWF World Tour, which was announced on 19 March 2017 and implemented in 2018, is a series of elite badminton tournaments sanctioned by the Badminton World Federation (BWF). The BWF World Tour is divided into levels of World Tour Finals, Super 1000, Super 750, Super 500, Super 300, and the BWF Tour Super 100.

Men's doubles
Year	Tournament	Level	Partner	Opponent	Score	Result
2023	Guwahati Masters	Super 100	(Chinese Taipei) Su Ching-heng	(Malaysia) Choong Hon Jian (Malaysia) Muhammad Haikal	17–21, 21–23	(silver) Runner-up
2023	Odisha Masters	Super 100	(Chinese Taipei) Su Ching-heng	(India) Krishna Prasad Garaga (India) Sai Pratheek K.	20–22, 21–18, 21–17	(gold) Winner

=== BWF International Challenge/Series (3 titles, 5 runners-up) ===
Men's doubles
Year	Tournament	Partner	Opponent	Score	Result
2018	Bulgarian Open	(Chinese Taipei) Chen Yu-jun	(France) Christo Popov (France) Toma Junior Popov	21–17, 7–21, 17–21	(silver) Runner-up
2022	Croatian International	(Chinese Taipei) Chen Yu-che	(Chinese Taipei) Chiu Hsiang-chieh (Chinese Taipei) Yang Ming-tse	15–21, 7–21	(silver) Runner-up
2026	North Harbour International	(Chinese Taipei) Chiu Shao-hua	(Chinese Taipei) Huang Tsung-i (Chinese Taipei) Lin Ting-yu	21–19, 21–16	(gold) Winner
2026	Bendigo International	(Chinese Taipei) Chiu Shao-hua	(Chinese Taipei) Huang Tsung-i (Chinese Taipei) Lin Ting-yu	22–20, 22–24, 21–18	(gold) Winner
2026	Sydney International	(Chinese Taipei) Chiu Shao-hua	(Philippines) Solomon Padiz Jr. (Philippines) Julius Villabrille	18–21, 21–18, 13–21	(silver) Runner-up
2026	Indonesia International	(Chinese Taipei) Chiu Shao-hua	(Indonesia) Kenas Adi Haryanto (Indonesia) Gilang Krisandi Toyo Pramana	21-10. 21-9	(gold) Winner

Mixed doubles
Year	Tournament	Partner	Opponent	Score	Result
2026	North Harbour International	(Chinese Taipei) Liao Jui-chi	(Australia) Andika Ramadiansyah (Australia) Nozomi Shimizu	10–21, 18–21	(silver) Runner-up
2026	Bendigo International	(Chinese Taipei) Lin Yen-yu	(Australia) Andika Ramadiansyah (Australia) Nozomi Shimizu	12–21, 14–21	(silver) Runner-up

BWF International Challenge tournament
BWF International Series tournament
BWF Future Series tournament
