= Muhammad Haikal =

Malaysian badminton player

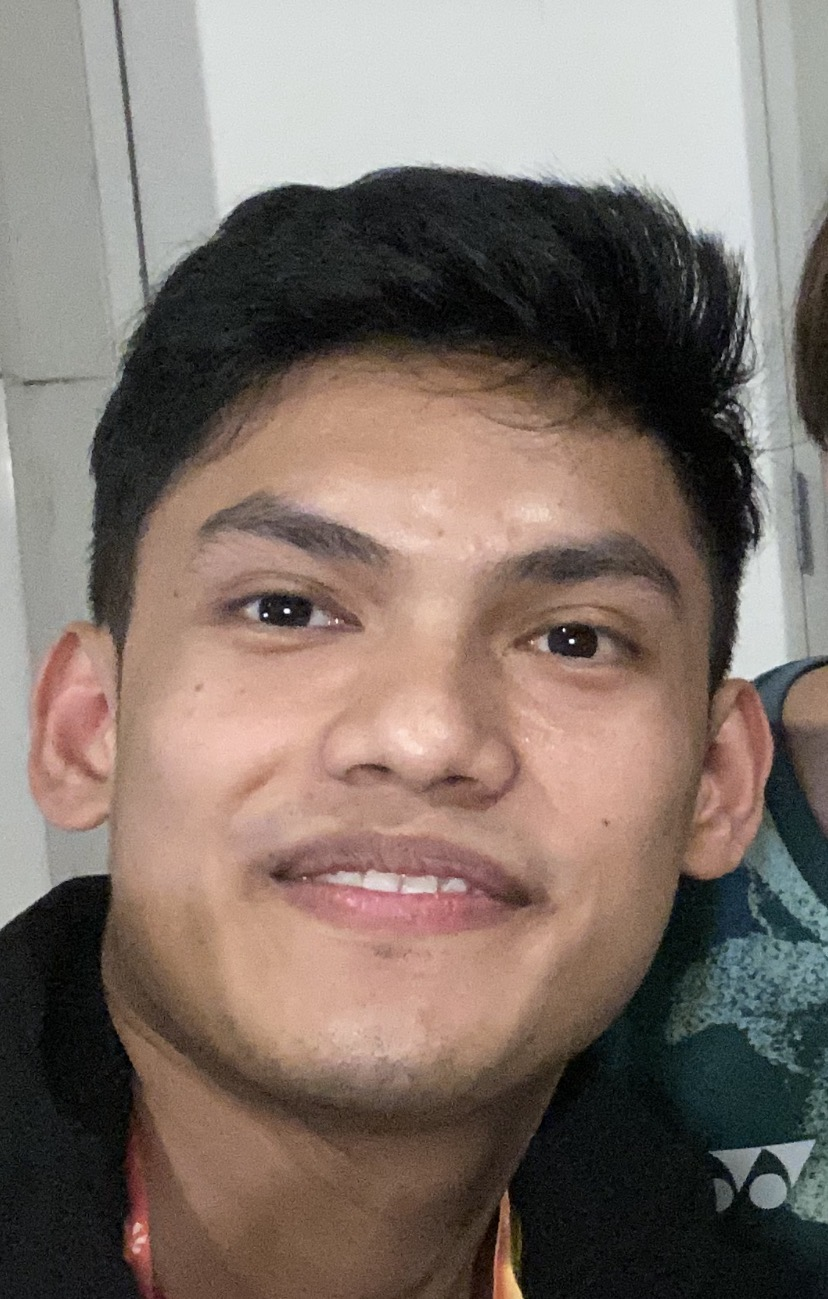

Personal information
- Born: Muhammad Haikal bin Nazri; 26 December 2002 (age 23) Kelantan, Malaysia
- Height: 1.62 m (5 ft 4 in)

Sport
- Country: Malaysia
- Sport: Badminton
- Handedness: Left

Men's doubles
- Highest ranking: 18 (with Choong Hon Jian, 17 September 2024); 38 (with Junaidi Arif, 6 December 2022)
- Current ranking: 37 (with Choong Hon Jian, 7 July 2026)
- BWF profile
Medal record
Men's badminton
Representing Malaysia
Thomas Cup
Bronze medal – third place	2024 Chengdu	Men's team
Asia Team Championships
Silver medal – second place	2024 Selangor	Men's team
SEA Games
Silver medal – second place	2021 Vietnam	Men's team

Muhammad Haikal bin Nazri (born 26 December 2002) is a Malaysian badminton player. He won three titles in 2021: Austrian Open, Hellas International and Ukraine International tournaments in the men's doubles event partnered with Junaidi Arif.

== Career ==
=== 2021 ===
Partnered with Junaidi Arif, they won the 2021 Austrian Open, Hellas International, and Ukraine International. The duo also finished runners-up at the Latvia International and Scottish Open.

=== 2022 ===
In January, Haikal and Arif competed at the Syed Modi International tournament. In April, they competed at the Orléans Masters but were forced to concede a walkover to Dutch pair Ruben Jille and Ties van der Lecq in the final after Haikal was tested positive for COVID-19. In May, he competed at the SEA Games, and won the silver medal in the men's team event.

A few months later, Haikal and Arif reached the quarter-finals of the Malaysia Masters. In December, he captured the Malaysia International title partnered with Nur Izzuddin.

=== 2023 ===
Following a reshuffle in the national men's doubles department in February, Haikal began partnering Izzuddin, thus ending his three-year partnership with Arif. In March, the new pair reached the final of Ruichang China Masters, but went down to the home pair of Chen Boyang and Liu Yi in rubber game.

In June, Haikal and Izzuddin's partnership were dissolved after Izzuddin reunited with his former partner Goh Sze Fei. In August, Haikal began partnering Choong Hon Jian.

In October, he and Choong entered the final of Indonesia Masters II and finished as the runners-up. In December, the duo competed at the Syed Modi International. En route to their first BWF World Tour title, they defeated the second and top seeds in the semi-finals and final, respectively. The following week, they won another title at the Guwahati Masters.

=== 2024 ===
In late January, he was chosen to represent Malaysia's men's team at the 2024 Asia Team Championships. In March, he and Choong clinched their third title at the Orléans Masters.

== Achievement ==
=== BWF World Tour (3 titles, 3 runners-up) ===
The BWF World Tour, which was announced on 19 March 2017 and implemented in 2018, is a series of elite badminton tournaments sanctioned by the Badminton World Federation (BWF). The BWF World Tours are divided into levels of World Tour Finals, Super 1000, Super 750, Super 500, Super 300, and the BWF Tour Super 100.

Men's doubles
Year	Tournament	Level	Partner	Opponent	Score	Result	Ref.
2022	Orléans Masters	Super 100	(Malaysia) Junaidi Arif	(Netherlands) Ruben Jille (Netherlands) Ties van der Lecq	Walkover	(silver) Runner-up	
2023	Ruichang China Masters	Super 100	(Malaysia) Nur Izzuddin	(China) Chen Boyang (China) Liu Yi	16–21, 21–19, 21–23	(silver) Runner-up	
2023 (II)	Indonesia Masters	Super 100	(Malaysia) Choong Hon Jian	(Japan) Kenya Mitsuhashi (Japan) Hiroki Okamura	16–21, 18–21	(silver) Runner-up	
2023	Syed Modi International	Super 300	(Malaysia) Choong Hon Jian	(Japan) Akira Koga (Japan) Taichi Saito	18–21, 21–18, 21–16	(gold) Winner	
2023	Guwahati Masters	Super 100	(Malaysia) Choong Hon Jian	(Chinese Taipei) Lin Bing-wei (Chinese Taipei) Su Ching-heng	21–17, 23–21	(gold) Winner	
2024	Orléans Masters	Super 300	(Malaysia) Choong Hon Jian	(Indonesia) Sabar Karyaman Gutama (Indonesia) Muhammad Reza Pahlevi Isfahani	21–15, 18–21, 21–14	(gold) Winner	

=== BWF International Challenge/Series (4 titles, 2 runners-up) ===
Men's doubles
Year	Tournament	Partner	Opponent	Score	Result	Ref.
2021	Austrian Open	(Malaysia) Junaidi Arif	(France) Lucas Corvée (France) Ronan Labar	21–17, 21–15	(gold) Winner	
2021	Latvia International	(Malaysia) Junaidi Arif	(Malaysia) Muhammad Nurfirdaus Azman (Malaysia) Yap Roy King	23–21, 15–21, 19–21	(silver) Runner-up	
2021	Hellas International	(Malaysia) Junaidi Arif	(Czech Republic) Ondřej Král (Czech Republic) Adam Mendrek	21–16, 21–15	(gold) Winner	
2021	Ukraine International	(Malaysia) Junaidi Arif	(India) Ishaan Bhatnagar (India) Sai Pratheek K.	21–15, 19–21, 21–15	(gold) Winner	
2021	Scottish Open	(Malaysia) Junaidi Arif	(Scotland) Christopher Grimley (Scotland) Matthew Grimley	20–22, 16–21	(silver) Runner-up	
2022	Malaysia International	(Malaysia) Nur Izzuddin	(Malaysia) Goh Boon Zhe (Malaysia) Goh Sze Fei	21–17, 21–16	(gold) Winner	

BWF International Challenge tournament
BWF International Series tournament
BWF Future Series tournament
