= Choong Hon Jian =

Malaysian badminton player

Choong Hon Jian 钟鸿健
Personal information
- Born: 2 July 2000 (age 26) Bukit Mertajam, Penang, Malaysia
- Years active: 2017–present
- Height: 1.84 m (6 ft 0 in)

Sport
- Country: Malaysia
- Sport: Badminton
- Handedness: Left

Men's & mixed doubles
- Highest ranking: 18 (MD with Muhammad Haikal, 17 September 2024); 38 (XD with Go Pei Kee, 25 June 2024)
- Current ranking: 37 (MD with Muhammad Haikal, 7 July 2026)
- BWF profile
Medal record
Men's badminton
Representing Malaysia
Thomas Cup
Bronze medal – third place	2024 Chengdu	Men's team
Asia Team Championships
Silver medal – second place	2024 Selangor	Men's team
Southeast Asian Games
Silver medal – second place	2023 Cambodia	Men's team
Asian Junior Championships
Bronze medal – third place	2018 Jakarta	Mixed team

Choong Hon Jian
- Traditional Chinese: 鍾鴻健
- Simplified Chinese: 钟鸿健
Transcriptions
Standard Mandarin
- Hanyu Pinyin: Zhōng Hóngjiàn
Hakka
- Pha̍k-fa-sṳ: Chûng Fùng-khien
Yue: Cantonese
- Jyutping: Zung1 Hung4 Gin6
Southern Min
- Hokkien POJ: Cheng Hông-kiān

Choong Hon Jian (Chinese: 鍾鴻健; pinyin: Zhōng Hóngjiàn; Pe̍h-ōe-jī: Cheng Hông-kiān; born 2 July 2000) is a Malaysian badminton player. He won a bronze medal at the 2018 Badminton Asia Junior Championships in the mixed team event.

== Career ==
=== 2021 ===
Choong won his first international title with his partner Toh Ee Wei at the Polish Open in March. Two months later, the pair went on to win two more consecutive titles at the Slovenian International and the Austrian Open.

=== 2023 ===
In February, Choong began partnering Goh Sze Fei in men's doubles following a reshuffle in the national men's doubles department. In the following month, they reached the final of their first outing together at the Thailand International but lost out narrowly to top seeds Chaloempon Charoenkitamorn and Nanthakarn Yordphaisong in rubber game. In May, he made his debut at the 2023 SEA Games where he helped Malaysia win a silver medal in the men's team event. In June, Choong and Goh's partnership were dissolved after Goh reunited with his former partner.

In August, he began partnering Muhammad Haikal in men's doubles. In October, Choong and his mixed doubles partner, Go Pei Kee, reached their first final together at the Indonesia International in Surabaya but were defeated in three games. A week later, he and Haikal entered the final of Indonesia Masters II and finished as the runners-up. In December, Choong and Haikal competed at the Syed Modi International. En route to their first BWF World Tour title, they defeated the second and top seeds in the semi-finals and final, respectively. The following week, they won another title at the Guwahati Masters.

=== 2024 ===
In late January, he was chosen to represent Malaysia's men's team at the 2024 Asia Team Championships. In March, he and Haikal clinched their third title at the Orléans Masters.

== Achievements ==
=== BWF World Tour (3 titles, 1 runner-up) ===
The BWF World Tour, which was announced on 19 March 2017 and implemented in 2018, is a series of elite badminton tournaments sanctioned by the Badminton World Federation (BWF). The BWF World Tours are divided into levels of World Tour Finals, Super 1000, Super 750, Super 500, Super 300, and the BWF Tour Super 100.

Men's doubles
Year	Tournament	Level	Partner	Opponent	Score	Result	Ref.
2023 (II)	Indonesia Masters	Super 100	(Malaysia) Muhammad Haikal	(Japan) Kenya Mitsuhashi (Japan) Hiroki Okamura	16–21, 18–21	(silver) Runner-up	
2023	Syed Modi International	Super 300	(Malaysia) Muhammad Haikal	(Japan) Akira Koga (Japan) Taichi Saito	18–21, 21–18, 21–16	(gold) Winner	
2023	Guwahati Masters	Super 100	(Malaysia) Muhammad Haikal	(Chinese Taipei) Lin Bing-wei (Chinese Taipei) Su Ching-heng	21–17, 23–21	(gold) Winner	
2024	Orléans Masters	Super 300	(Malaysia) Muhammad Haikal	(Indonesia) Sabar Karyaman Gutama (Indonesia) Muhammad Reza Pahlevi Isfahani	21–15, 18–21, 21–14	(gold) Winner	

=== BWF International Challenge/Series (4 titles, 4 runners-up) ===
Men's doubles
Year	Tournament	Partner	Opponent	Score	Result
2023	Thailand International	(Malaysia) Goh Sze Fei	(Thailand) Chaloempon Charoenkitamorn (Thailand) Nanthakarn Yordphaisong	21–15, 15–21, 22–24	(silver) Runner-up
2026	Philippine International	(Malaysia) Wong Vin Sean	(Indonesia) Taufik Aderya (Indonesia) Alexius Ongkytama Subagio	21–16, 13–21, 21–15	(gold) Winner
2026	Malaysia International	(Malaysia) Wong Vin Sean	(Japan) Naoya Kawashima (Japan) Kota Ogawa	17–21, 21–10, 21–23	(silver) Runner-up

Mixed doubles
Year	Tournament	Partner	Opponent	Score	Result
2019	Bangladesh International	(Malaysia) Payee Lim Peiy Yee	(Malaysia) Hoo Pang Ron (Malaysia) Cheah Yee See	8–21, 19–21	(silver) Runner-up
2021	Polish Open	(Malaysia) Toh Ee Wei	(Switzerland) Nicolas A. Müller (Switzerland) Ronja Stern	21–16, 21–12	(gold) Winner
2021	Slovenian International	(Malaysia) Toh Ee Wei	(Indonesia) Putra Erwiansyah (Indonesia) Sofy Al Mushira Asharunnisa	21–18, 21–18	(gold) Winner
2021	Austrian Open	(Malaysia) Toh Ee Wei	(France) William Villeger (France) Sharone Bauer	16–21, 21–9, 21–19	(gold) Winner
2023 (II)	Indonesia International	(Malaysia) Go Pei Kee	(Japan) Hiroki Nishi (Japan) Akari Sato	20–22, 21–18, 14–21	(silver) Runner-up

BWF International Challenge tournament
BWF International Series tournament
