= 2025 India Open =

Badminton tournament in India

Tournament details
- Dates: 14–19 January
- Edition: 23rd
- Level: Super 750
- Total prize money: US$950,000
- Venue: K. D. Jadhav Indoor Stadium
- Location: New Delhi, India

Champions
- Men's singles: (Denmark) Viktor Axelsen
- Women's singles: (South Korea) An Se-young
- Men's doubles: (Malaysia) Goh Sze Fei (Malaysia) Nur Izzuddin
- Women's doubles: (Japan) Arisa Igarashi (Japan) Ayako Sakuramoto
- Mixed doubles: (China) Jiang Zhenbang (China) Wei Yaxin

The 2025 India Open, officially known as the Yonex Sunrise India Open 2025 for sponsorship reasons, was a badminton tournament that took place at the K. D. Jadhav Indoor Stadium, New Delhi, India, from 14 to 19 January 2025. Contestants competed for prizes up to US$950,000.

== Tournament ==
The 2025 India Open was the second tournament of the 2025 BWF World Tour and a part of the India Open, which has been held since 1973. It was organized by the Badminton Association of India with sanction from the BWF.

=== Venue ===
This tournament was held at the K. D. Jadhav Indoor Stadium of the Indira Gandhi Arena in New Delhi, India.

=== Broadcasts ===
India Open 2025 was broadcast on Warner Bros. Discovery (via Eurosport and Discovery channels) held the broadcast rights, with streaming available on FanCode in partnership with the Badminton Association of India.

Fans could watch the live active at the K. D. Jadhav Indoor Stadium, New Delhi, India. Unlike previous editions, in 2025 the event was ticketed with tickets exclusively available on Ticmint in partnership with the Badminton Association of India.

=== Point distribution ===
Below is the point distribution table for each phase of the tournament based on the BWF points system for the BWF World Tour Super 750 event.

Winner	Runner-up	3/4	5/8	9/16	17/32
11,000	9,350	7,700	6,050	4,320	2,660

=== Prize pool ===
The total prize money is US$950,000 with the distribution of the prize money in accordance with BWF regulations.

Event	Winner	Finalist	Semi-finals	Quarter-finals	Last 16	Last 32
Singles	$66,500	$32,300	$13,300	$5,225	$2,850	$950
Doubles	$70,300	$33,250	$13,300	$5,937.50	$3,087.50	$950

== Men's singles ==
=== Seeds ===
1. (China) Shi Yuqi (withdrew)
2. (Indonesia) Jonatan Christie (semi-finals)
3. (Denmark) Viktor Axelsen (champion)
4. (Thailand) Kunlavut Vitidsarn (first round)
5. (China) Li Shifeng (first round)
6. (Japan) Kodai Naraoka (second round)
7. (Chinese Taipei) Chou Tien-chen (quarter-finals)
8. (Indonesia) Anthony Sinisuka Ginting (withdrew)

=== Finals ===
Semi-finals
(China) Weng Hongyang	21	10	16
(Hong Kong) Lee Cheuk Yiu	13	21	21
3	(Denmark) Viktor Axelsen	17	21	21
2	(Indonesia) Jonatan Christie	21	14	15

Final
(Hong Kong) Lee Cheuk Yiu	16	8
3	(Denmark) Viktor Axelsen	21	21

=== Top half ===
==== Section 1 ====
First round
4	(Thailand) K Vitidsarn	11	21	14
(France) A Lanier	21	14	21
(Japan) Y Tanaka	19	21	25
PFR	(India) K George	21	14	27
5	(China) Li SF	21	17	17
(Malaysia) Leong J H	18	21	21
(China) Weng HY	w	/	o
PFR	(India) S Kidambi

Second round
(France) A Lanier	20	13
PFR	(India) K George	22	21
(Malaysia) Leong J H	18	12
(China) Weng HY	21	21

Quarter-finals
PFR	(India) K George	13	19
(China) Weng HY	21	21

==== Section 2 ====
First round
7	(Chinese Taipei) Chou T-c	21	21
(Canada) B Yang	12	9
(Denmark) R Gemke	19	21	12
(China) Lu GZ	21	16	21
SWM	(Japan) K Watanabe	20	14
(Hong Kong) Lee C Y	22	21
(France) T J Popov	20	21	21
(Japan) K Nishimoto	22	10	14

Second round
7	(Chinese Taipei) Chou T-c	21	13	21
(China) Lu GZ	15	21	14
(Hong Kong) Lee C Y	14	21	22
(France) T J Popov	21	18	20

Quarter-finals
7	(Chinese Taipei) Chou T-c	15	8
(Hong Kong) Lee C Y	21	21

=== Bottom half ===
==== Section 3 ====
First round
(Chinese Taipei) Lee C-h	15	20
(Singapore) Loh K Y	21	22
(India) P Rajawat	16	22	13
6	(Japan) K Naraoka	21	20	21
(Japan) T Obayashi	16	16
(Singapore) J Teh	21	21
(Chinese Taipei) Chi Y-j	21	11	13
3	(Denmark) V Axelsen	16	21	21

Second round
(Singapore) Loh K Y	21	21
6	(Japan) K Naraoka	17	15
(Singapore) J Teh	11	14
3	(Denmark) V Axelsen	21	21

Quarter-finals
(Singapore) Loh K Y	19	21	8
3	(Denmark) V Axelsen	21	13	21

==== Section 4 ====
First round
(China) Lei LX	15	18
(France) C Popov	21	21
(Chinese Taipei) Lin C-y	21	21
SWM	(India) L Sen	15	10
(Chinese Taipei) Su L-y	16	21	21
(India) Prannoy H. S.	21	18	12
(Chinese Taipei) Wang T-w	18	15
2	(Indonesia) J Christie	21	21

Second round
(France) C Popov	23	11
(Chinese Taipei) Lin C-y	25	21
(Chinese Taipei) Su L-y	16	11
2	(Indonesia) J Christie	21	21

Quarter-finals
(Chinese Taipei) Lin C-y	20	21	10
2	(Indonesia) J Christie	22	9	21

== Women's singles ==
=== Seeds ===
1. (South Korea) An Se-young (champion)
2. (China) Wang Zhiyi (quarter-finals)
3. (China) Han Yue (quarter-finals)
4. (Indonesia) Gregoria Mariska Tunjung (semi-finals)
5. (Thailand) Busanan Ongbamrungphan (withdrew)
6. (Japan) Tomoka Miyazaki (semi-finals)
7. (Singapore) Yeo Jia Min (quarter-finals)
8. (Thailand) Pornpawee Chochuwong (final)

=== Finals ===
Semi-finals
1	(South Korea) An Se-young	21	21
4	(Indonesia) Gregoria Mariska Tunjung	19	16
8	(Thailand) Pornpawee Chochuwong	11	24	21
6	(Japan) Tomoka Miyazaki	21	22	19

Final
1	(South Korea) An Se-young	21	21
8	(Thailand) Pornpawee Chochuwong	12	9

=== Top half ===
==== Section 1 ====
First round
1	(South Korea) An S-y	22	21
(Chinese Taipei) Chiu P-c	20	15
(Japan) N Okuhara	13	15
(Thailand) R Intanon	21	21
7	(Singapore) Yeo J M	19	22	21
(Vietnam) Nguyễn T L	21	20	5
(Scotland) K Gilmour	21	10	14
(Chinese Taipei) Hsu W-c	15	21	21

Second round
1	(South Korea) An S-y	21	21
(Thailand) R Intanon	15	8
7	(Singapore) Yeo J M	21	19	21
(Chinese Taipei) Hsu W-c	12	21	19

Quarter-finals
1	(South Korea) An S-y	21	21
7	(Singapore) Yeo J M	11	12

==== Section 2 ====
First round
4	(Indonesia) G M Tunjung	25	21	21
(Denmark) L Christophersen	27	12	11
(Japan) N Nidaira	22
(Hong Kong) Lo S Y	20^{r}
SWM	(India) P. V. Sindhu	21	22
(Chinese Taipei) Sung S-y	14	20
(Canada) WY Zhang	5	8
(Japan) M Suizu	21	21

Second round
4	(Indonesia) G M Tunjung	21	24
(Japan) N Nidaira	12	22
SWM	(India) P. V. Sindhu	21	21
(Japan) M Suizu	15	13

Quarter-finals
4	(Indonesia) G M Tunjung	21	19	21
SWM	(India) P. V. Sindhu	9	21	17

=== Bottom half ===
==== Section 3 ====
First round
(Chinese Taipei) Lin H-t	21	13	14
(China) Gao FJ	18	21	21
(India) A Kashyap	17	13
8	(Thailand) P Chochuwong	21	21
(Japan) K Sugiyama	21	21
(United States) L Lam	8	8
(India) M Bansod	22	16	11
3	(China) Han Y	20	21	21

Second round
(China) Gao FJ	21	16	15
8	(Thailand) P Chochuwong	16	21	21
(Japan) K Sugiyama	12	9
3	(China) Han Y	21	21

Quarter-finals
8	(Thailand) P Chochuwong	21	21
3	(China) Han Y	17	16

==== Section 4 ====
First round
PFR	(India) R Ramraj	17	18
(India) A Upadhyaya	21	21
(Thailand) P Choeikeewong	5	24	9
6	(Japan) T Miyazaki	21	22	21
(Denmark) J D Jakobsen	9	14
(Denmark) M Blichfeldt	21	21
(United States) BW Zhang	21	15	16
2	(China) Wang ZY	14	21	21

Second round
(India) A Upadhyaya	6	9
6	(Japan) T Miyazaki	21	21
(Denmark) M Blichfeldt	13	21	8
2	(China) Wang ZY	21	16	21

Quarter-finals
6	(Japan) T Miyazaki	21	0
2	(China) Wang ZY	16	0^{r}

== Men's doubles ==
=== Seeds ===
1. (Denmark) Kim Astrup / Anders Skaarup Rasmussen (first round)
2. (China) Liang Weikeng / Wang Chang (quarter-finals)
3. (Malaysia) Goh Sze Fei / Nur Izzuddin (champions)
4. (Indonesia) Fajar Alfian / Muhammad Rian Ardianto (second round)
5. (Malaysia) Aaron Chia / Soh Wooi Yik (semi-finals)
6. (China) He Jiting / Ren Xiangyu (second round)
7. (India) Satwiksairaj Rankireddy / Chirag Shetty (semi-finals)
8. (Chinese Taipei) Lee Jhe-huei / Yang Po-hsuan (first round)

=== Finals ===
Semi-finals
7	(India) Satwiksairaj Rankireddy (India) Chirag Shetty	18	14
3	(Malaysia) Goh Sze Fei (Malaysia) Nur Izzuddin	21	21
5	(Malaysia) Aaron Chia (Malaysia) Soh Wooi Yik	20	19
(South Korea) Kim Won-ho (South Korea) Seo Seung-jae	22	21

Final
3	(Malaysia) Goh Sze Fei (Malaysia) Nur Izzuddin	21	13	21
(South Korea) Kim Won-ho (South Korea) Seo Seung-jae	15	21	16

=== Top half ===
==== Section 1 ====
First round
1	(Denmark) K Astrup (Denmark) A S Rasmussen	22	19	16
(South Korea) Jin Y (South Korea) Kang M-h	20	21	21
(Scotland) C Grimley (Scotland) M Grimley	11	15
(Chinese Taipei) Chiu H-c (Chinese Taipei) Wang C-l	21	21
7	(India) S Rankireddy (India) C Shetty	23	19	21
(Malaysia) Man W C (Malaysia) Tee K W	21	21	16
(India) P Krishnamurthy Roy (India) K S Pratheek	19	16
(Japan) K Mitsuhashi (Japan) H Okamura	21	21

Second round
(South Korea) Jin Y (South Korea) Kang M-h	21	19	21
(Chinese Taipei) Chiu H-c (Chinese Taipei) Wang C-l	15	21	17
7	(India) S Rankireddy (India) C Shetty	20	21	21
(Japan) K Mitsuhashi (Japan) H Okamura	22	14	16

Quarter-finals
(South Korea) Jin Y (South Korea) Kang M-h	10	17
7	(India) S Rankireddy (India) C Shetty	21	21

==== Section 2 ====
First round
3	(Malaysia) Goh S F (Malaysia) N Izzuddin	21	21
(Malaysia) N M Azriyn A (Malaysia) Tan W K	16	16
(Malaysia) J Arif (Malaysia) Yap R K	21	21
(Germany) D Hess (Germany) M Seidel	11	8
8	(Chinese Taipei) Lee J-h (Chinese Taipei) Yang P-hs	14	17
(Chinese Taipei) Lee F-c (Chinese Taipei) Lee F-j	21	21
(Chinese Taipei) Liu K-h (Chinese Taipei) Yang P-ha	10	22	21
(France) C Popov (France) T J Popov	21	20	14

Second round
3	(Malaysia) Goh S F (Malaysia) N Izzuddin	25	21
(Malaysia) J Arif (Malaysia) Yap R K	23	19
(Chinese Taipei) Lee F-c (Chinese Taipei) Lee F-j	21	20	21
(Chinese Taipei) Liu K-h (Chinese Taipei) Yang P-ha	16	22	12

Quarter-finals
3	(Malaysia) Goh S F (Malaysia) N Izzuddin	21	21
(Chinese Taipei) Lee F-c (Chinese Taipei) Lee F-j	11	17

=== Bottom half ===
==== Section 3 ====
First round
(China) Xie HN (China) Zeng WH	6
(China) Chen BY (China) Liu Y	4^{r}
(Thailand) P Sukphun (Thailand) P Teeraratsakul	22	16	18
5	(Malaysia) A Chia (Malaysia) Soh W Y	20	21	21
(Thailand) K Kedren (Thailand) D Puavaranukroh	21	19	21
(Chinese Taipei) Chen Z-r (Chinese Taipei) Lin Y-c	14	21	18
(Malaysia) Lim T J (Malaysia) Wong T C	21	10	14
4	(Indonesia) F Alfian (Indonesia) M R Ardianto	19	21	21

Second round
(China) Xie HN (China) Zeng WH	10	18
5	(Malaysia) A Chia (Malaysia) Soh W Y	21	21
(Thailand) K Kedren (Thailand) D Puavaranukroh	24	16	21
4	(Indonesia) F Alfian (Indonesia) M R Ardianto	22	21	16

Quarter-finals
5	(Malaysia) A Chia (Malaysia) Soh W Y	21	21
(Thailand) K Kedren (Thailand) D Puavaranukroh	18	18

==== Section 4 ====
First round
(South Korea) Kim W-h (South Korea) Seo S-j	25	21	21
(Chinese Taipei) Chiang C-w (Chinese Taipei) Wu H-y	23	23	13
(Denmark) D Lundgaard (Denmark) M Vestergaard	17	21	16
6	(China) He JT (China) Ren XY	21	16	21
(England) B Lane (England) S Vendy	21	21
PFR	(India) C Joshi (India) M Rana	8	14
(Malaysia) Ong Y S (Malaysia) Teo E Y	12	21	15
2	(China) Liang WK (China) Wang C	21	19	21

Second round
(South Korea) Kim W-h (South Korea) Seo S-j	21	21
6	(China) He JT (China) Ren XY	14	18
(England) B Lane (England) S Vendy	15	22
2	(China) Liang WK (China) Wang C	21	24

Quarter-finals
(South Korea) Kim W-h (South Korea) Seo S-j	12	22	23
2	(China) Liang WK (China) Wang C	21	20	21

== Women's doubles ==
=== Seeds ===
1. (China) Liu Shengshu / Tan Ning (quarter-finals)
2. (South Korea) Baek Ha-na / Lee So-hee (quarter-finals)
3. (Malaysia) Pearly Tan / Thinaah Muralitharan (semi-finals)
4. (China) Li Yijing / Luo Xumin (semi-finals)
5. (India) Treesa Jolly / Gayatri Gopichand (first round)
6. (Hong Kong) Yeung Nga Ting / Yeung Pui Lam (quarter-finals)
7. (India) Tanisha Crasto / Ashwini Ponnappa (second round)
8. (South Korea) Kim Hye-jeong / Kong Hee-yong (final)

=== Finals ===
Semi-finals
(Japan) Arisa Igarashi (Japan) Ayako Sakuramoto	18	21	21
4	(China) Li Yijing (China) Luo Xumin	21	13	17
3	(Malaysia) Pearly Tan (Malaysia) Thinaah Muralitharan	18	18
8	(South Korea) Kim Hye-jeong (South Korea) Kong Hee-yong	21	21

Final
(Japan) Arisa Igarashi (Japan) Ayako Sakuramoto	21	21
8	(South Korea) Kim Hye-jeong (South Korea) Kong Hee-yong	15	13

=== Top half ===
==== Section 1 ====
First round
1	(China) Liu SS (China) Tan N	21	21
(Austria) S Au Yeong (Austria) A Hagspiel	8	4
(India) A Gahlawat (India) S Gahlawat	12	4
(Chinese Taipei) Hu L-f (Chinese Taipei) Jheng Y-c	21	21
5	(India) T Jolly (India) G Gopichand	21	19
(Japan) A Igarashi (Japan) A Sakuramoto	23	21
(Thailand) O Jongsathapornparn (Thailand) S Suwachai	19	21	21
PFR	(India) A Pramuthesh (India) S Singh	21	15	12

Second round
1	(China) Liu SS (China) Tan N	21	21
(Chinese Taipei) Hu L-f (Chinese Taipei) Jheng Y-c	14	10
(Japan) A Igarashi (Japan) A Sakuramoto	21	21
(Thailand) O Jongsathapornparn (Thailand) S Suwachai	11	9

Quarter-finals
1	(China) Liu SS (China) Tan N	15	19
(Japan) A Igarashi (Japan) A Sakuramoto	21	21

==== Section 2 ====
First round
4	(China) Li YJ (China) Luo XM	21	21
(India) R Ganesh (India) S Sikkandar	8	9
(India) K A Bhat (India) S Gautam	22	21
(Canada) J Dent (Canada) C Lai	20	18
6	(Hong Kong) Yeung N T (Hong Kong) Yeung P L	21	21
(Scotland) J MacPherson (Scotland) C Torrance	7	9
(Chinese Taipei) Hsu Y-h (Chinese Taipei) Lin J-y	21	21
(Ukraine) P Buhrova (Ukraine) Y Kantemyr	12	11

Second round
4	(China) Li YJ (China) Luo XM	21	21
(India) K A Bhat (India) S Gautam	7	10
6	(Hong Kong) Yeung N T (Hong Kong) Yeung P L	21	21	21
(Chinese Taipei) Hsu Y-h (Chinese Taipei) Lin J-y	23	15	17

Quarter-finals
4	(China) Li YJ (China) Luo XM	21	21
6	(Hong Kong) Yeung N T (Hong Kong) Yeung P L	12	17

=== Bottom half ===
==== Section 3 ====
First round
(Japan) Y Fukushima (Japan) M Matsumoto	21	21
(Poland) P Hankiewicz (Poland) K Marczak	8	9
PFR	(India) K Gupta (India) R Sharma	11	12
7	(India) T Crasto (India) A Ponnappa	21	21
(Chinese Taipei) Sung S-y (Chinese Taipei) Yu C-h	14	16
(China) Jia YF (China) Zhang SX	21	21
(India) P Alvekar (India) M Deshpande	8	19
3	(Malaysia) P Tan (Malaysia) Thinaah M	21	21

Second round
(Japan) Y Fukushima (Japan) M Matsumoto	21	23
7	(India) T Crasto (India) A Ponnappa	9	21
(China) Jia YF (China) Zhang SX	4^{r}
3	(Malaysia) P Tan (Malaysia) Thinaah M	14

Quarter-finals
(Japan) Y Fukushima (Japan) M Matsumoto	18	19
3	(Malaysia) P Tan (Malaysia) Thinaah M	21	21

==== Section 4 ====
First round
(Chinese Taipei) Chang C-h (Chinese Taipei) Yang C-t	21	8	16
(Japan) M Matsutomo (Japan) C Shida	16	21	21
(India) G Rawat (India) M Rawat	7	3
8	(South Korea) Kim H-j (South Korea) Kong H-y	21	21
(India) R Panda (India) S Panda	7	21	21
PFR	(Thailand) P Aiamvareesrisakul (Thailand) S Janpeng	21	19	14
(Thailand) B Aimsaard (Thailand) N Aimsaard	21	19	20
2	(South Korea) Baek H-n (South Korea) Lee S-h	19	21	22

Second round
(Japan) M Matsutomo (Japan) C Shida	21	10	16
8	(South Korea) Kim H-j (South Korea) Kong H-y	17	21	21
(India) R Panda (India) S Panda	6	7
2	(South Korea) Baek H-n (South Korea) Lee S-h	21	21

Quarter-finals
8	(South Korea) Kim H-j (South Korea) Kong H-y	21	21	21
2	(South Korea) Baek H-n (South Korea) Lee S-h	23	19	18

== Mixed doubles ==
=== Seeds ===
1. (China) Feng Yanzhe / Huang Dongping (withdrew)
2. (China) Jiang Zhenbang / Wei Yaxin (champions)
3. (Malaysia) Chen Tang Jie / Toh Ee Wei (semi-finals)
4. (Malaysia) Goh Soon Huat / Shevon Jemie Lai (semi-finals)
5. (Chinese Taipei) Yang Po-hsuan / Hu Ling-fang (quarter-finals)
6. (China) Cheng Xing / Zhang Chi (second round)
7. (China) Guo Xinwa / Chen Fanghui (quarter-finals)
8. (Japan) Hiroki Midorikawa / Natsu Saito (quarter-finals)

=== Finals ===
Semi-finals
3	(Malaysia) Chen Tang Jie (Malaysia) Toh Ee Wei	17	15
SWM	(France) Thom Gicquel (France) Delphine Delrue	21	21
4	(Malaysia) Goh Soon Huat (Malaysia) Shevon Jemie Lai	21	19	9
2	(China) Jiang Zhenbang (China) Wei Yaxin	18	21	21

Final
SWM	(France) Thom Gicquel (France) Delphine Delrue	18	17
2	(China) Jiang Zhenbang (China) Wei Yaxin	21	21

=== Top half ===
==== Section 1 ====
First round
3	(Malaysia) Chen T J (Malaysia) Toh E W	21	21
(Chinese Taipei) Ye H-w (Chinese Taipei) N G Chan	15	16
(Hong Kong) Tang C M (Hong Kong) Ng T Y	17	19
(Thailand) D Puavaranukroh (Thailand) S Paewsampran	21	21
6	(China) Cheng X (China) Zhang C	21	21
(United States) L Wang (United States) E Wang	6	13
(Chinese Taipei) Liu K-h (Chinese Taipei) Jheng Y-c	18	15
(Thailand) R Oupthong (Thailand) J Sudjaipraparat	21	21

Second round
3	(Malaysia) Chen T J (Malaysia) Toh E W	19	21	22
(Thailand) D Puavaranukroh (Thailand) S Paewsampran	21	12	20
6	(China) Cheng X (China) Zhang C	17	22	17
(Thailand) R Oupthong (Thailand) J Sudjaipraparat	21	20	21

Quarter-finals
3	(Malaysia) Chen T J (Malaysia) Toh E W	21	21
(Thailand) R Oupthong (Thailand) J Sudjaipraparat	16	17

==== Section 2 ====
First round
8	(Japan) H Midorikawa (Japan) N Saito	21	21
(Malaysia) Hoo P R (Malaysia) Cheng S Y	18	15
(India) D Kapila (India) T Crasto	8	21	21
(Chinese Taipei) Chen C-k (Chinese Taipei) Hsu Y-h	21	19	17
SWM	(France) T Gicquel (France) D Delrue	21	21
(India) S Karunakaran (India) A Variyath	12	10
(Singapore) T Hee (Singapore) Jin YJ	17	21	21
(India) R Kapoor (India) R Gadde	21	18	15

Second round
8	(Japan) H Midorikawa (Japan) N Saito	21	21
(India) D Kapila (India) T Crasto	18	17
SWM	(France) T Gicquel (France) D Delrue	21	21
(Singapore) T Hee (Singapore) Jin YJ	14	9

Quarter-finals
8	(Japan) H Midorikawa (Japan) N Saito	16	18
SWM	(France) T Gicquel (France) D Delrue	21	21

=== Bottom half ===
==== Section 3 ====
First round
PFR	(India) T Kona (India) S K P Kudaravalli	14	15
(India) A Surya (India) A Pramuthesh	21	21
(England) C Hemming (England) E van Leeuwen	19	12
5	(Chinese Taipei) Yang P-h (Chinese Taipei) Hu L-f	21	21
PFR	(Japan) Y Watanabe (Japan) M Taguchi	21	21
(Malaysia) Wong T C (Malaysia) Lim C S	17	15
(Indonesia) R Rivaldy (Indonesia) L A Kusumawati	17	17
4	(Malaysia) Goh S H (Malaysia) S J Lai	21	21

Second round
(India) A Surya (India) A Pramuthesh	8	11
5	(Chinese Taipei) Yang P-h (Chinese Taipei) Hu L-f	21	21
PFR	(Japan) Y Watanabe (Japan) M Taguchi	10	21	16
4	(Malaysia) Goh S H (Malaysia) S J Lai	21	19	21

Quarter-finals
5	(Chinese Taipei) Yang P-h (Chinese Taipei) Hu L-f	11	15
4	(Malaysia) Goh S H (Malaysia) S J Lai	21	21

==== Section 4 ====
First round
(Scotland) A Dunn (Scotland) J MacPherson	12	21	21
(United States) P Smith (United States) J Gai	21	15	13
(Netherlands) R Tabeling (Denmark) A Bøje	13	13
7	(China) Guo XW (China) Chen FH	21	21
(Denmark) M Vestergaard (Denmark) C Busch	12	16
(Indonesia) D Ferdinansyah (Indonesia) S F S Ramadhanti	21	21
(England) G Mairs (England) J Mairs	14	16
2	(China) Jiang ZB (China) Wei YX	21	21

Second round
(Scotland) A Dunn (Scotland) J MacPherson	17	12
7	(China) Guo XW (China) Chen FH	21	21
(Indonesia) D Ferdinansyah (Indonesia) S F S Ramadhanti	19	16
2	(China) Jiang ZB (China) Wei YX	21	21

Quarter-finals
7	(China) Guo XW (China) Chen FH	14	21	11
2	(China) Jiang ZB (China) Wei YX	21	18	21

Preceded by 2025 Malaysia Open	BWF World Tour; 2025 BWF season	Succeeded by 2025 Indonesia Masters
