= 2024 Thailand Masters (badminton) =

Badminton tournament in Thailand

Tournament details
- Dates: 30 January – 4 February
- Edition: 7th
- Level: Super 300
- Total prize money: US$210,000
- Venue: Nimibutr Stadium
- Location: Bangkok, Thailand

Champions
- Men's singles: (Chinese Taipei) Chou Tien-chen
- Women's singles: (Japan) Aya Ohori
- Men's doubles: (China) He Jiting (China) Ren Xiangyu
- Women's doubles: (Thailand) Benyapa Aimsaard (Thailand) Nuntakarn Aimsaard
- Mixed doubles: (Thailand) Dechapol Puavaranukroh (Thailand) Sapsiree Taerattanachai

The 2024 Thailand Masters (officially known as the Princess Sirivannavari Thailand Masters 2024 for sponsorship reasons) was a badminton tournament that took place at the Nimibutr Stadium, Bangkok, Thailand, from 30 January to 4 February 2024 and has a total prize of US$210,000.

== Tournament ==
The 2024 Thailand Masters was the fourth tournament of the 2024 BWF World Tour and was part of the Thailand Masters championships, which had been held since 2016. This tournament was organized by the Badminton Association of Thailand with sanction from the BWF.

=== Venue ===
This tournament was held at the Nimibutr Stadium in Bangkok, Thailand.

=== Point distribution ===
Below is the point distribution table for each phase of the tournament based on the BWF points system for the BWF World Tour Super 300 event.

Winner	Runner-up	3/4	5/8	9/16	17/32	33/64	65/128
7,000	5,950	4,900	3,850	2,750	1,670	660	320

=== Prize pool ===
The total prize money is US$210,000 with the distribution of the prize money in accordance with BWF regulations.

Event	Winner	Finalist	Semi-finals	Quarter-finals	Last 16
Singles	$15,750	$7,980	$3,045	$1,260	$735
Doubles	$16,590	$7,980	$2,940	$1,522.5	$787.5

== Men's singles ==
=== Seeds ===
1. (Thailand) Kunlavut Vitidsarn (withdrew)
2. (Singapore) Loh Kean Yew (final)
3. (Japan) Kenta Nishimoto (first round)
4. (Japan) Kanta Tsuneyama (withdrew)
5. (Chinese Taipei) Chou Tien-chen (champion)
6. (Malaysia) Ng Tze Yong (withdrew)
7. (Hong Kong) Lee Cheuk Yiu (first round)
8. (Hong Kong) Ng Ka Long (quarter-finals)

=== Finals ===
Semi-finals
(Netherlands) Mark Caljouw	15	12
5	(Chinese Taipei) Chou Tien-chen	21	21
(Chinese Taipei) Su Li-yang	14	14
2	(Singapore) Loh Kean Yew	21	21

Final
5	(Chinese Taipei) Chou Tien-chen	21	6	21
2	(Singapore) Loh Kean Yew	16	21	16

=== Top half ===
==== Section 1 ====
First round
PFQ	(Indonesia) A Farhan	15	14
(Netherlands) M Caljouw	21	21
(Czech Republic) J Louda	21	10	15
PFQ	(Malaysia) Cheam J W	15	21	21
PFQ	(India) M Manjunath	21	21
Q4	(Hong Kong) J Gunawan	17	8
(India) S Kidambi	22	21
(Chinese Taipei) Wang T-w	20	19

Second round
(Netherlands) M Caljouw	21	21
PFQ	(Malaysia) Cheam J W	7	11
PFQ	(India) M Manjunath	21	13	21
(India) S Kidambi	9	21	17

Quarter-finals
(Netherlands) M Caljouw	21	21
PFQ	(India) M Manjunath	19	15

==== Section 2 ====
First round
PFQ	(Singapore) J Teh	21	15	16
(Chinese Taipei) Lin C-y	16	21	21
Q3	(India) S Subramanian	21	21
(Malaysia) Leong J H	14	17
5	(Chinese Taipei) Chou T-c	23	21
(Chinese Taipei) Lee C-h	21	18
(South Korea) Jeon H-j	11	15
Q2	(Chinese Taipei) Wang P-w	21	21

Second round
(Chinese Taipei) Lin C-y	21	21
Q3	(India) S Subramanian	9	11
5	(Chinese Taipei) Chou T-c	21	15	21
Q2	(Chinese Taipei) Wang P-w	18	21	19

Quarter-finals
(Chinese Taipei) Lin C-y	21	17	21
5	(Chinese Taipei) Chou T-c	12	21	23

=== Bottom half ===
==== Section 3 ====
First round
(Thailand) K Wangcharoen	24	13	21
(Brazil) Y Coelho	22	21	16
Q1	(India) S Verma	14	18
8	(Hong Kong) Ng K L	21	21
(China) Lei LX	21	0
(India) K George	17	0^{r}
(Chinese Taipei) Su L-y	21	21
3	(Japan) K Nishimoto	17	19

Second round
(Thailand) K Wangcharoen	13	12
8	(Hong Kong) Ng K L	21	21
(China) Lei LX	12	14
(Chinese Taipei) Su L-y	21	21

Quarter-finals
8	(Hong Kong) Ng K L	18	13
(Chinese Taipei) Su L-y	21	21

==== Section 4 ====
First round
(Chinese Taipei) Chi Y-j	21	21
(Republic of Ireland) N Nguyen	14	14
(Japan) T Obayashi	21	21
7	(Hong Kong) Lee C Y	10	17
(Canada) B Yang	9^{r}
(Israel) M Zilberman	11
(Chinese Taipei) Huang Y-k	15	13
2	(Singapore) Loh K Y	21	21

Second round
(Chinese Taipei) Chi Y-j	18	25	8
(Japan) T Obayashi	21	23	21
(Israel) M Zilberman	9	6
2	(Singapore) Loh K Y	21	21

Quarter-finals
(Japan) T Obayashi	13	13
2	(Singapore) Loh K Y	21	21

== Women's singles ==
=== Seeds ===
1. (Thailand) Ratchanok Intanon (quarter-finals)
2. (Thailand) Pornpawee Chochuwong (withdrew)
3. (Japan) Aya Ohori (champion)
4. (Thailand) Supanida Katethong (final)
5. (Thailand) Busanan Ongbamrungphan (semi-finals)
6. (Singapore) Yeo Jia Min (withdrew)
7. (Chinese Taipei) Hsu Wen-chi (quarter-finals)
8. (Canada) Michelle Li (first round)

=== Finals ===
Semi-finals
5	(Thailand) Busanan Ongbamrungphan	16	12
3	(Japan) Aya Ohori	21	21
4	(Thailand) Supanida Katethong	21	21
PFQ	(India) Ashmita Chaliha	13	12

Final
3	(Japan) Aya Ohori	18	21	21
4	(Thailand) Supanida Katethong	21	17	13

=== Top half ===
==== Section 1 ====
First round
1	(Thailand) R Intanon	21	21
PFQ	(Malaysia) Letshanaa K	13	9
(Japan) T Miyazaki	21	22
(Denmark) L Christophersen	7	20
5	(Thailand) B Ongbamrungphan	21	21
PFQ	(India) Samiya I F	14	18
(India) M Bansod	22	21
PFQ	(Peru) I Castillo	20	8

Second round
1	(Thailand) R Intanon	21	9	21
(Japan) T Miyazaki	19	21	18
5	(Thailand) B Ongbamrungphan	24	21
(India) M Bansod	22	7

Quarter-finals
1	(Thailand) R Intanon	21	20	14
5	(Thailand) B Ongbamrungphan	18	22	21

==== Section 2 ====
First round
3	(Japan) A Ohori	21	18	22
(Chinese Taipei) Huang Y-h	16	21	20
(Denmark) J D Jakobsen	21	21
Q3	(Poland) J Rudna	13	10
PFQ	(Chinese Taipei) Chiu P-c	24	21
Q1	(Chinese Taipei) Yu C-h	22	14
(Japan) N Okuhara	21	21
Q4	(Thailand) T Nithiittikrai	11	16

Second round
3	(Japan) A Ohori	21	21
(Denmark) J D Jakobsen	13	7
(Chinese Taipei) Chiu P-c	14	15
(Japan) N Okuhara	21	21

Quarter-finals
3	(Japan) A Ohori	15	22	21
(Japan) N Okuhara	21	20	18

=== Bottom half ===
==== Section 3 ====
First round
(Myanmar) Thet Htar T	21	21
(United States) L Lam	14	14
Q2	(Ukraine) P Buhrova	8	12
7	(Chinese Taipei) Hsu W-c	21	21
(Chinese Taipei) Lin H-t	21	21
PFQ	(Republic of Ireland) R Darragh	11	13
(Chinese Taipei) Sung S-y	16	21	20
4	(Thailand) S Katethong	21	18	22

Second round
(Myanmar) Thet Htar T	16	11
7	(Chinese Taipei) Hsu W-c	21	21
(Chinese Taipei) Lin H-t	17	14
4	(Thailand) S Katethong	21	21

Quarter-finals
7	(Chinese Taipei) Hsu W-c	17	11
4	(Thailand) S Katethong	21	21

==== Section 4 ====
First round
(Indonesia) E N T Wardoyo	21	16	21
PFQ	(Chinese Taipei) Liang T-y	16	21	12
(Canada) W Y Zhang	17	21	21
8	(Canada) M Li	21	19	17
PFQ	(India) A Chaliha	21	21
PFR	(Malaysia) Wong L C	10	16
(Chinese Taipei) Pai Y-p	21	21
PFQ	(Indonesia) K A C Dewi	12	17

Second round
(Indonesia) E N T Wardoyo	21	21
(Canada) W Y Zhang	12	14
PFQ	(India) A Chaliha	21	15	21
(Chinese Taipei) Pai Y-p	12	21	17

Quarter-finals
(Indonesia) E N T Wardoyo	14	21	13
PFQ	(India) A Chaliha	21	19	21

== Men's doubles ==
=== Seeds ===
1. (Indonesia) Fajar Alfian / Muhammad Rian Ardianto (withdrew)
2. (Indonesia) Muhammad Shohibul Fikri / Bagas Maulana (semi-finals)
3. (Indonesia) Leo Rolly Carnando / Daniel Marthin (second round)
4. (Malaysia) Ong Yew Sin / Teo Ee Yi (second round)
5. (China) He Jiting / Ren Xiangyu (champions)
6. (Japan) Akira Koga / Taichi Saito (quarter-finals)
7. (Chinese Taipei) Lee Jhe-huei / Yang Po-hsuan (quarter-finals)
8. (Germany) Mark Lamsfuß / Marvin Seidel (quarter-finals)

=== Finals ===
Semi-finals
(Thailand) Supak Jomkoh (Thailand) Kittinupong Kedren	22	13
Q4	(Thailand) Peeratchai Sukphun (Thailand) Pakkapon Teeraratsakul	24	21
5	(China) He Jiting (China) Ren Xiangyu	21	21
2	(Indonesia) Muhammad Shohibul Fikri (Indonesia) Bagas Maulana	15	6

Final
Q4	(Thailand) Peeratchai Sukphun (Thailand) Pakkapon Teeraratsakul	21	14	13
5	(China) He Jiting (China) Ren Xiangyu	16	21	21

=== Top half ===
==== Section 1 ====
First round
PFQ	(Malaysia) Lwi S H (Malaysia) J Wong	16	10
(Thailand) S Jomkoh (Thailand) K Kedren	21	21
(South Korea) Kim W-h (South Korea) Na S-s	16
(Malaysia) Choong H J (Malaysia) M Haikal	7^{r}
8	(Germany) M Lamsfuß (Germany) M Seidel	21	21
PFQ	(Republic of Ireland) J Magee (Republic of Ireland) P Reynolds	7	14
(Chinese Taipei) Chen C-k (Chinese Taipei) Chen S-f	18	18
(Chinese Taipei) Wei C-w (Chinese Taipei) Wu G-x	21	21

Second round
(Thailand) S Jomkoh (Thailand) K Kedren	21	10	21
(South Korea) Kim W-h (South Korea) Na S-s	15	21	18
8	(Germany) M Lamsfuß (Germany) M Seidel	16	21	21
(Chinese Taipei) Wei C-w (Chinese Taipei) Wu G-x	21	9	16

Quarter-finals
(Thailand) S Jomkoh (Thailand) K Kedren	21	16	21
8	(Germany) M Lamsfuß (Germany) M Seidel	14	21	15

==== Section 2 ====
First round
3	(Indonesia) L R Carnando (Indonesia) D Marthin	21	21
PFQ	(Chinese Taipei) Lu M-c (Chinese Taipei) Tang K-w	12	16
(Denmark) D Lundgaard (Denmark) M Vestergaard	13	21	13
Q4	(Thailand) P Sukphun (Thailand) P Teeraratsakul	21	16	21
6	(Japan) A Koga (Japan) T Saito	21	21
(Chinese Taipei) Lin B-w (Chinese Taipei) Su C-h	13	19
(Chinese Taipei) Chang K-c (Chinese Taipei) Po L-w	21	18	21
(Malaysia) Low H Y (Malaysia) Ng E C	17	21	15

Second round
3	(Indonesia) L R Carnando (Indonesia) D Marthin	17	21	16
Q4	(Thailand) P Sukphun (Thailand) P Teeraratsakul	21	19	21
6	(Japan) A Koga (Japan) T Saito	21	21
(Chinese Taipei) Chang K-c (Chinese Taipei) Po L-w	13	18

Quarter-finals
Q4	(Thailand) P Sukphun (Thailand) P Teeraratsakul	14	21	22
6	(Japan) A Koga (Japan) T Saito	21	17	20

=== Bottom half ===
==== Section 3 ====
First round
Q2	(Thailand) T Punpanich (Thailand) W Sothon	15	19
(Indonesia) R Hidayat (Indonesia) Y Rambitan	21	21
Q3	(Malaysia) Chia W J (Malaysia) Liew X	21	14	19
5	(China) He JT (China) Ren XY	10	21	21
(Denmark) A Søndergaard (Denmark) J Toft	21	21
(China) Chen BY (China) Liu Yi	19	17
(China) Xie HN (China) Zeng WH	17	16
4	(Malaysia) Ong Y S (Malaysia) Teo E Y	21	21

Second round
(Indonesia) R Hidayat (Indonesia) Y Rambitan	16	13
5	(China) He JT (China) Ren XY	21	21
(Denmark) A Søndergaard (Denmark) J Toft	25	14	21
4	(Malaysia) Ong Y S (Malaysia) Teo E Y	23	21	14

Quarter-finals
5	(China) He JT (China) Ren XY	21	21
(Denmark) A Søndergaard (Denmark) J Toft	18	14

==== Section 4 ====
First round
(Czech Republic) O Král (Czech Republic) A Mendrek	21	21
(United States) V Chiu (United States) J Yuan	19	12
(Indonesia) S K Gutama (Indonesia) M R P Isfahani	11	21	18
7	(Chinese Taipei) Lee J-h (Chinese Taipei) Yang P-hs	21	13	21
Q1	(South Korea) Ko S-h (South Korea) Shin B-c	21	17	21
(Thailand) P Kaosamaang (Thailand) W Thongsa-nga	15	21	19
(Canada) A Dong (Canada) N Yakura	11	11
2	(Indonesia) M S Fikri (Indonesia) B Maulana	21	21

Second round
(Czech Republic) O Král (Czech Republic) A Mendrek	6	13
7	(Chinese Taipei) Lee J-h (Chinese Taipei) Yang P-hs	21	21
Q1	(South Korea) Ko S-h (South Korea) Shin B-c	0^{r}
2	(Indonesia) M S Fikri (Indonesia) B Maulana	5

Quarter-finals
7	(Chinese Taipei) Lee J-h (Chinese Taipei) Yang P-hs	21	9	18
2	(Indonesia) M S Fikri (Indonesia) B Maulana	15	21	21

== Women's doubles ==
=== Seeds ===
1. (Thailand) Jongkolphan Kititharakul / Rawinda Prajongjai (first round)
2. (Thailand) Benyapa Aimsaard / Nuntakarn Aimsaard (champions)
3. (China) Li Wenmei / Liu Xuanxuan (quarter-finals)
4. (Indonesia) Febriana Dwipuji Kusuma / Amallia Cahaya Pratiwi (semi-finals)
5. (Bulgaria) Gabriela Stoeva / Stefani Stoeva (withdrew)
6. (India) Treesa Jolly / Gayatri Gopichand (quarter-finals)
7. (Hong Kong) Yeung Nga Ting / Yeung Pui Lam (first round)
8. (Chinese Taipei) Lee Chia-hsin / Teng Chun-hsun (first round)

=== Finals ===
Semi-finals
(China) Li Yijing (China) Luo Xumin	21	21
(South Korea) Lee Yu-lim (South Korea) Shin Seung-chan	15	18
4	(Indonesia) Febriana Dwipuji Kusuma (Indonesia) Amallia Cahaya Pratiwi	13	21
2	(Thailand) Benyapa Aimsaard (Thailand) Nuntakarn Aimsaard	21	23

Final
(China) Li Yijing (China) Luo Xumin	13	21	25
2	(Thailand) Benyapa Aimsaard (Thailand) Nuntakarn Aimsaard	21	17	27

=== Top half ===
==== Section 1 ====
First round
1	(Thailand) J Kititharakul (Thailand) R Prajongjai	9^{r}
PFQ	(China) Keng SL (China) Zhang C	12
(Indonesia) M T Puspita Sari (Indonesia) R A Rose	13	14
(China) Li YJ (China) Luo XM	21	21
8	(Chinese Taipei) Lee C-h (Chinese Taipei) Teng C-h	21	19	6^{r}
(United States) P L Cao Hok (United States) L Lam	18	21	11
Q2	(Poland) P Hankiewicz (Poland) K Marczak	6	8
(United States) F Corbett (United States) A Lee	21	21

Second round
PFQ	(China) Keng SL (China) Zhang C	16	7^{r}
(China) Li YJ (China) Luo XM	21	9
(United States) P L Cao Hok (United States) L Lam	14	16
(United States) F Corbett (United States) A Lee	21	21

Quarter-finals
(China) Li YJ (China) Luo XM	21	21
(United States) F Corbett (United States) A Lee	13	10

==== Section 2 ====
First round
3	(China) Li WM (China) Liu XX	21	21
(Japan) Y Fukushima (Japan) R Kiyose	18	16
Q4	(Chinese Taipei) Huang Y-h (Chinese Taipei) Liang T-y	22	22
(Chinese Taipei) Liu C-y (Chinese Taipei) Wang Y-q	20	20
PFQ	(Chinese Taipei) Sung S-y (Chinese Taipei) Yu C-h	21	15	12
(South Korea) Lee Y-l (South Korea) Shin S-c	19	21	21
PFQ	(Chinese Taipei) Hung E-t (Chinese Taipei) Lin Y-p	21	21
(Netherlands) D Jille (Netherlands) C Seinen	16	11

Second round
3	(China) Li WM (China) Liu XX	21	21
Q4	(Chinese Taipei) Huang Y-h (Chinese Taipei) Liang T-y	15	13
(South Korea) Lee Y-l (South Korea) Shin S-c	21	21
PFQ	(Chinese Taipei) Hung E-t (Chinese Taipei) Lin Y-p	15	13

Quarter-finals
3	(China) Li WM (China) Liu XX	17	16
(South Korea) Lee Y-l (South Korea) Shin S-c	21	21

=== Bottom half ===
==== Section 3 ====
First round
(India) T Crasto (India) A Ponnappa	21	21
PFQ	(Chinese Taipei) Hu L-f (Chinese Taipei) Lin X-m	13	17
(Hong Kong) Lui L L (Hong Kong) Ng W Y	21	10	18
6	(India) T Jolly (India) G Gopichand	16	21	21
Q3	(Chinese Taipei) Hsu Y-h (Chinese Taipei) Lin J-y	21	21
(Chinese Taipei) Hsu Y-c (Chinese Taipei) Lin W-c	17	18
(Chinese Taipei) Chang C-h (Chinese Taipei) Yang C-t	13	11
4	(Indonesia) F D Kusuma (Indonesia) A C Pratiwi	21	21

Second round
(India) T Crasto (India) A Ponnappa	15	22
6	(India) T Jolly (India) G Gopichand	21	24
Q3	(Chinese Taipei) Hsu Y-h (Chinese Taipei) Lin J-y	14	22
4	(Indonesia) F D Kusuma (Indonesia) A C Pratiwi	21	24

Quarter-finals
6	(India) T Jolly (India) G Gopichand	12	21	21
4	(Indonesia) F D Kusuma (Indonesia) A C Pratiwi	21	17	23

==== Section 4 ====
First round
(Indonesia) J P Miantoro (Indonesia) F Setianingrum	21	22
Q1	(Poland) A Khomich (Poland) D Zimnol	12	20
(Germany) L Efler (Germany) I Lohau	21	15	21
7	(Hong Kong) Yeung N T (Hong Kong) Yeung P L	18	21	15
(United States) A Xu (United States) K Xu	13	21	12
(Indonesia) L T Mayasari (Indonesia) R Sugiarto	21	18	21
PFQ	(Australia) K Ea (Australia) G Somerville	10	8
2	(Thailand) B Aimsaard (Thailand) N Aimsaard	21	21

Second round
(Indonesia) J P Miantoro (Indonesia) F Setianingrum	23	21
(Germany) L Efler (Germany) I Lohau	21	8
(Indonesia) L T Mayasari (Indonesia) R Sugiarto	13	23
2	(Thailand) B Aimsaard (Thailand) N Aimsaard	21	25

Quarter-finals
(Indonesia) J P Miantoro (Indonesia) F Setianingrum	9	7
2	(Thailand) B Aimsaard (Thailand) N Aimsaard	21	21

== Mixed doubles ==
=== Seeds ===
1. (Thailand) Dechapol Puavaranukroh / Sapsiree Taerattanachai (champions)
2. (Malaysia) Chen Tang Jie / Toh Ee Wei (final)
3. (Japan) Hiroki Midorikawa / Natsu Saito (semi-finals)
4. (Indonesia) Dejan Ferdinansyah / Gloria Emanuelle Widjaja (quarter-finals)
5. (Malaysia) Goh Soon Huat / Shevon Jemie Lai (second round)
6. (Netherlands) Robin Tabeling / Selena Piek (quarter-finals)
7. (Japan) Kyohei Yamashita / Naru Shinoya (quarter-finals)
8. (Indonesia) Rinov Rivaldy / Pitha Haningtyas Mentari (first round)

=== Finals ===
Semi-finals
1	(Thailand) Dechapol Puavaranukroh (Thailand) Sapsiree Taerattanachai	21	21
(Indonesia) Rehan Naufal Kusharjanto (Indonesia) Lisa Ayu Kusumawati	17	14
3	(Japan) Hiroki Midorikawa (Japan) Natsu Saito	11	17
2	(Malaysia) Chen Tang Jie (Malaysia) Toh Ee Wei	21	21

Final
1	(Thailand) Dechapol Puavaranukroh (Thailand) Sapsiree Taerattanachai	21	21
2	(Malaysia) Chen Tang Jie (Malaysia) Toh Ee Wei	12	18

=== Top half ===
==== Section 1 ====
First round
1	(Thailand) D Puavaranukroh (Thailand) S Taerattanachai	21	21
Q1	(Malaysia) Choong H J (Malaysia) Go P K	7	14
Q4	(United States) P Smith (United States) A Lee	21	12	18
(China) Cheng X (China) Zhang C	15	21	21
7	(Japan) K Yamashita (Japan) N Shinoya	21	21
Q3	(Chinese Taipei) Po L-w (Chinese Taipei) Chang C-h	12	13
(United States) V Chiu (United States) J Gai	13	22	13
(Thailand) S Jomkoh (Thailand) S Paewsampran	21	20	21

Second round
1	(Thailand) D Puavaranukroh (Thailand) S Taerattanachai	21	21
(China) Cheng X (China) Zhang C	8	17
7	(Japan) K Yamashita (Japan) N Shinoya	13	21	21
(Thailand) S Jomkoh (Thailand) S Paewsampran	21	7	15

Quarter-finals
1	(Thailand) D Puavaranukroh (Thailand) S Taerattanachai	21	21
7	(Japan) K Yamashita (Japan) N Shinoya	16	13

==== Section 2 ====
First round
4	(Indonesia) D Ferdinansyah (Indonesia) G E Widjaja	21	16	21
(Singapore) T Hee (Singapore) J Tan	13	21	16
(Hong Kong) Lee C H (Hong Kong) Ng T Y	24	21
(Malaysia) Chan P S (Malaysia) Cheah Y S	22	18
5	(Malaysia) Goh S H (Malaysia) S J Lai	17	28	21
(Denmark) M Vestergaard (Denmark) C Busch	21	26	9
(Denmark) J Toft (Denmark) C Graversen	11	8
(Indonesia) R N Kusharjanto (Indonesia) L A Kusumawati	21	21

Second round
4	(Indonesia) D Ferdinansyah (Indonesia) G E Widjaja	21	24
(Hong Kong) Lee C H (Hong Kong) Ng T Y	15	22
5	(Malaysia) Goh S H (Malaysia) S J Lai	17	21	16
(Indonesia) R N Kusharjanto (Indonesia) L A Kusumawati	21	17	21

Quarter-finals
4	(Indonesia) D Ferdinansyah (Indonesia) G E Widjaja	20	17
(Indonesia) R N Kusharjanto (Indonesia) L A Kusumawati	22	21

=== Bottom half ===
==== Section 3 ====
First round
Q2	(Chinese Taipei) Chen S-f (Chinese Taipei) Lin J-y	14	19
(Thailand) R Oupthong (Thailand) J Sudjaipraparat	21	21
(Germany) M Lamsfuß (Germany) I Lohau	21	21
8	(Indonesia) R Rivaldy (Indonesia) P H Mentari	15	15
(Chinese Taipei) Yang P-hs (Chinese Taipei) Hu L-f	22	17	21
(Indonesia) J Hidayatullah (Indonesia) A S P Pranata	20	21	18
(Indonesia) A Maulana (Indonesia) N V Marwah	15	16
3	(Japan) H Midorikawa (Japan) N Saito	21	21

Second round
(Thailand) R Oupthong (Thailand) J Sudjaipraparat	21	21
(Germany) M Lamsfuß (Germany) I Lohau	19	19
(Chinese Taipei) Yang P-hs (Chinese Taipei) Hu L-f	19	20
3	(Japan) H Midorikawa (Japan) N Saito	21	22

Quarter-finals
(Thailand) R Oupthong (Thailand) J Sudjaipraparat	16	16
3	(Japan) H Midorikawa (Japan) N Saito	21	21

==== Section 4 ====
First round
(Malaysia) Tan K M (Malaysia) Lai P J	21	21
(Chinese Taipei) Chang K-c (Chinese Taipei) Lee C-c	11	17
(Chinese Taipei) Chiu H-c (Chinese Taipei) Lin X-m	18	15
6	(Netherlands) R Tabeling (Netherlands) S Piek	21	21
(Malaysia) Hoo P R (Malaysia) Cheng S Y	w	/	o
(England) M Ellis (England) L Smith
(Australia) K Choo (Australia) G Somerville	12	11
2	(Malaysia) Chen T J (Malaysia) Toh E W	21	21

Second round
(Malaysia) Tan K M (Malaysia) Lai P J	21	15	19
6	(Netherlands) R Tabeling (Netherlands) S Piek	18	21	21
(Malaysia) Hoo P R (Malaysia) Cheng S Y	14	15
2	(Malaysia) Chen T J (Malaysia) Toh E W	21	21

Quarter-finals
6	(Netherlands) R Tabeling (Netherlands) S Piek	12	23
2	(Malaysia) Chen T J (Malaysia) Toh E W	21	25

Preceded by 2024 Indonesia Masters	BWF World Tour; 2024 BWF season	Succeeded by 2024 German Open
