= 2026 Badminton Asia Championships =

Tournament details
- Dates: 7–12 April 2026
- Edition: 43rd
- Venue: Ningbo Olympic Sports Center Gymnasium
- Location: Ningbo, China

Champions
- Men's singles: (China) Shi Yuqi
- Women's singles: (South Korea) An Se-young
- Men's doubles: (South Korea) Kim Won-ho (South Korea) Seo Seung-jae
- Women's doubles: (China) Li Yijing (China) Luo Xumin
- Mixed doubles: (South Korea) Kim Jae-hyeon (South Korea) Jang Ha-jeong

The 2026 Badminton Asia Championships (officially known as the Bank of Ningbo Badminton Asia Championships 2026 for sponsorship reasons) was the 43rd edition of the Badminton Asia Championships. The tournament was organised by Badminton Asia and took place at the Ningbo Olympic Sports Center Gymnasium, Ningbo, China, from 7 to 12 April 2026 and had a total prize of US$550,000.

== Tournament ==
The 2026 Badminton Asia Championships was the 43rd edition of the Badminton Asia Championships. This tournament was organized by Badminton Asia and hosted by the Chinese Badminton Association.

=== Venue ===
This tournament was held at the Ningbo Olympic Sports Center Gymnasium in Ningbo, Zhejiang, China.

=== Point distribution ===
Below is the point distribution table for each phase of the tournament based on the BWF points system for the Badminton Asia Championships, which is equivalent to a BWF World Tour Super 1000.

Winner	Runner-up	3/4	5/8	9/16	17/32	33/64
12,000	10,200	8,400	6,600	4,800	3,000	1,200

=== Prize pool ===
The total prize money is US$550,000 with the distribution of the prize money in accordance with BWF regulations.

Event	Winner	Finalist	Semi-finals	Quarter-finals	Last 16	Last 32
Singles	$38,500	$18,700	$7,700	$3,025	$1,650	$550
Doubles	$40,700	$19,250	$7,700	$3,437.50	$1,787.50	$550

== Medal Summary ==
=== Medalists ===
Event	Gold	Silver	Bronze
Men's singles	(China) Shi Yuqi	(India) Ayush Shetty	(Thailand) Kunlavut Vitidsarn
Men's singles	(China) Shi Yuqi	(India) Ayush Shetty	(Chinese Taipei) Chou Tien-chen
Women's singles	(South Korea) An Se-young	(China) Wang Zhiyi	(South Korea) Sim Yu-jin
Women's singles	(South Korea) An Se-young	(China) Wang Zhiyi	(Japan) Akane Yamaguchi
Men's doubles	(South Korea) Kim Won-ho (South Korea) Seo Seung-jae	(South Korea) Kang Min-hyuk (South Korea) Ki Dong-ju	(China) He Jiting (China) Ren Xiangyu
Men's doubles	(South Korea) Kim Won-ho (South Korea) Seo Seung-jae	(South Korea) Kang Min-hyuk (South Korea) Ki Dong-ju	(Indonesia) Fajar Alfian (Indonesia) Muhammad Shohibul Fikri
Women's doubles	(China) Li Yijing (China) Luo Xumin	(China) Liu Shengshu (China) Tan Ning	(Indonesia) Amallia Cahaya Pratiwi (Indonesia) Siti Fadia Silva Ramadhanti
Women's doubles	(China) Li Yijing (China) Luo Xumin	(China) Liu Shengshu (China) Tan Ning	(Japan) Yuki Fukushima (Japan) Mayu Matsumoto
Mixed doubles	(South Korea) Kim Jae-hyeon (South Korea) Jang Ha-jeong	(Thailand) Dechapol Puavaranukroh (Thailand) Supissara Paewsampran	(China) Feng Yanzhe (China) Huang Dongping
Mixed doubles	(South Korea) Kim Jae-hyeon (South Korea) Jang Ha-jeong	(Thailand) Dechapol Puavaranukroh (Thailand) Supissara Paewsampran	(Japan) Yuta Watanabe (Japan) Maya Taguchi

=== Medal table ===
* Host nation (China)

Rank	Nation	Gold	Silver	Bronze	Total
1	South Korea	3	1	1	5
2	China*	2	2	2	6
3	Thailand	0	1	1	2
4	India	0	1	0	1
5	Japan	0	0	3	3
6	Indonesia	0	0	2	2
7	Chinese Taipei	0	0	1	1
Totals (7 entries)		5	5	10	20

== Qualification ==
=== Final standings ===
Group	Men's singles	Women's singles	Men's doubles	Women's doubles	Mixed doubles
A	(Indonesia) Zaki Ubaidillah	(Philippines) Mikaela Joy De Guzman	(Vietnam) Nguyễn Đinh Hoàng (Vietnam) Trần Đình Mạnh	(South Korea) Lee Seo-jin (South Korea) Lee Yeon-woo	(Hong Kong) Hung Kuei Chun (Hong Kong) Tsang Hiu Yan
B	(Vietnam) Nguyễn Hải Đăng	(Hong Kong) Lo Sin Yan	(China) He Jiting (China) Ren Xiangyu	(Vietnam) Phạm Thị Diệu Ly (Vietnam) Phạm Thị Khánh	(Bangladesh) Al-Amin Jumar (Bangladesh) Urmi Akter
C	(Sri Lanka) Viren Nettasinghe	(Maldives) Fathimath Nabaaha Abdul Razzaq	(Hong Kong) Law Cheuk Him (Hong Kong) Yeung Shing Choi	(Singapore) Tay Andrea Jcqui (Singapore) Teo Eng Ker	(Vietnam) Trần Đình Mạnh (Vietnam) Phạm Thị Khánh
D	(Philippines) Clarence Villaflor	(United Arab Emirates) Prakriti Bharath	(Philippines) Solomon Jr. Padiz (Philippines) Julius Villabrille	(Malaysia) Low Zi Yu (Malaysia) Noraqilah Maisarah	(South Korea) Kim Jae-hyeon (South Korea) Jang Ha-jeong

== Men's singles ==
=== Seeds ===
1. (Thailand) Kunlavut Vitidsarn (semi-finals)
2. (China) Shi Yuqi (champion)
3. (Indonesia) Jonatan Christie (quarter-finals)
4. (Chinese Taipei) Chou Tien-chen (semi-finals)
5. (China) Li Shifeng (first round)
6. (Chinese Taipei) Lin Chun-yi (first round)
7. (Japan) Kodai Naraoka (quarter-finals)
8. (Singapore) Loh Kean Yew (quarter-finals)

=== Finals ===
Semi-finals
1	(Thailand) Kunlavut Vitidsarn	21	19	17
(India) Ayush Shetty	10	21	21
4	(Chinese Taipei) Chou Tien-chen	9	13
2	(China) Shi Yuqi	21	21

Final
(India) Ayush Shetty	8	10
2	(China) Shi Yuqi	21	21

=== Top half ===
==== Section 1 ====
First round
1	(Thailand) K Vitidsarn	21	21
(Hong Kong) Ng K L	14	18
(South Korea) Jeon H-j	17	16
(Japan) Y Tanaka	21	21
6	(Chinese Taipei) Lin C-y
(China) Weng HY	w	/	o
B1	(Vietnam) Nguyễn H Đ	22	12
(India) Prannoy H. S.	24	21

Second round
1	(Thailand) K Vitidsarn	8	21	21
(Japan) Y Tanaka	21	18	5
(China) Weng HY	21	21
(India) Prannoy H. S.	12	19

Quarter-finals
1	(Thailand) K Vitidsarn	20	21	21
(China) Weng HY	22	9	9

==== Section 2 ====
First round
3	(Indonesia) J Christie	21	21
(Malaysia) Leong J H	13	8
(Japan) Y Okimoto	21	17	21
(Singapore) J Teh	19	21	13
5	(China) Li SF	13	16
(India) A Shetty	21	21
(Hong Kong) J Gunawan	15	16
(Chinese Taipei) Chi Y-j	21	21

Second round
3	(Indonesia) J Christie	21	21
(Japan) Y Okimoto	18	13
(India) A Shetty	21	21
(Chinese Taipei) Chi Y-j	16	12

Quarter-finals
3	(Indonesia) J Christie	21	17
(India) A Shetty	23	21

=== Bottom half ===
==== Section 3 ====
First round
A1	(Indonesia) Z Ubaidillah	21	14	18
(Japan) K Watanabe	15	21	21
(India) S Kidambi	21	9	11
8	(Singapore) Loh K Y	18	21	21
(China) Lu GZ	22	21
C1	(Sri Lanka) V Nettasinghe	20	16
(Thailand) Pan Teeraratsakul	15	17
4	(Chinese Taipei) Chou T-c	21	21

Second round
(Japan) K Watanabe	20	21	15
8	(Singapore) Loh K Y	22	15	21
(China) Lu GZ
4	(Chinese Taipei) Chou T-c	w	/	o

Quarter-finals
8	(Singapore) Loh K Y	21	12	17
4	(Chinese Taipei) Chou T-c	16	21	21

==== Section 4 ====
First round
(Indonesia) A Farhan	21	14	21
(Malaysia) J Hoh	19	21	18
D1	(Philippines) C Villaflor	9	14
7	(Japan) K Naraoka	21	21
(Hong Kong) Lee C Y	21	21
(India) L Sen	12	19
(Chinese Taipei) Lee C-h	15	17
2	(China) Shi YQ	21	21

Second round
(Indonesia) A Farhan	16	17
7	(Japan) K Naraoka	21	21
(Hong Kong) Lee C Y	11	10
2	(China) Shi YQ	21	21

Quarter-finals
7	(Japan) K Naraoka	18	18
2	(China) Shi YQ	21	21

== Women's singles ==
=== Seeds ===
1. (South Korea) An Se-young (champion)
2. (China) Wang Zhiyi (final)
3. (China) Chen Yufei (withdrew)
4. (Japan) Akane Yamaguchi (semi-finals)
5. (China) Han Yue (first round)
6. (Indonesia) Putri Kusuma Wardani (second round)
7. (Thailand) Ratchanok Intanon (first round)
8. (Thailand) Pornpawee Chochuwong (second round)

=== Finals ===
Semi-finals
1	(South Korea) An Se-young	21	21
(South Korea) Sim Yu-jin	14	9
4	(Japan) Akane Yamaguchi	21	9	13
2	(China) Wang Zhiyi	14	21	21

Final
1	(South Korea) An Se-young	21	17	21
2	(China) Wang Zhiyi	12	21	18

=== Top half ===
==== Section 1 ====
First round
1	(South Korea) An S-y	21	21
(Singapore) Yeo J M	15	10
(Vietnam) Nguyễn T L	21	21
(Chinese Taipei) Huang Y-h	13	16
SWM	(Japan) T Miyazaki	21	21
PFQ	(Malaysia) Goh J W	12	15
(Thailand) S Katethong	25	8	18
(India) U Hooda	23	21	21

Second round
1	(South Korea) An S-y	21	21
(Vietnam) Nguyễn T L	7	6
SWM	(Japan) T Miyazaki	21	21
(India) U Hooda	17	9

Quarter-finals
1	(South Korea) An S-y	21	21
SWM	(Japan) T Miyazaki	16	10

==== Section 2 ====
First round
5	(China) Han Y	21	10	15
(South Korea) Sim Y-j	16	21	21
(Malaysia) Letshanaa K	21	21
(India) T Sharma	19	14
8	(Thailand) P Chochuwong	21	21
(Chinese Taipei) Lin H-t	18	15
(Japan) N Okuhara	21	21
A1	(Philippines) M J de Guzman	13	9

Second round
(South Korea) Sim Y-j	21	21
(Malaysia) Letshanaa K	14	8
8	(Thailand) P Chochuwong	18	21	14
(Japan) N Okuhara	21	19	21

Quarter-finals
(South Korea) Sim Y-j	21	21
(Japan) N Okuhara	18	11

=== Bottom half ===
==== Section 3 ====
First round
(Chinese Taipei) Sung S-y	13	11
(China) Gao FJ	21	21
D1	(United Arab Emirates) P Bharath	3	7
6	(Indonesia) P K Wardani	21	21
(India) M Bansod	10	19
(Thailand) B Ongbamrungphan	21	21
C1	(Maldives) F N Abdul Razzaq	5	9
4	(Japan) A Yamaguchi	21	21

Second round
(China) Gao FJ	18	21	21
6	(Indonesia) P K Wardani	21	12	17
(Thailand) B Ongbamrungphan	12	12
4	(Japan) A Yamaguchi	21	21

Quarter-finals
(China) Gao FJ	23	11	13
4	(Japan) A Yamaguchi	21	21	21

==== Section 4 ====
First round
(Japan) R Gunji	22	21
B1	(Hong Kong) Lo S Y	20	15
(South Korea) Kim G-e	21	21
7	(Thailand) R Intanon	16	18
(Malaysia) Wong L C	21	11	19
(India) P. V. Sindhu	15	21	21
(Chinese Taipei) Chiu P-c	16	12
2	(China) Wang ZY	21	21

Second round
(Japan) R Gunji	21	16	21
(South Korea) Kim G-e	17	21	12
(India) P. V. Sindhu	18	8
2	(China) Wang ZY	21	21

Quarter-finals
(Japan) R Gunji	13	15
2	(China) Wang ZY	21	21

== Men's doubles ==
=== Seeds ===
1. (South Korea) Kim Won-ho / Seo Seung-jae (champions)
2. (Malaysia) Aaron Chia / Soh Wooi Yik (quarter-finals)
3. (China) Liang Weikeng / Wang Chang (quarter-finals)
4. (India) Satwiksairaj Rankireddy / Chirag Shetty (withdrew)
5. (Indonesia) Fajar Alfian / Muhammad Shohibul Fikri (semi-finals)
6. (Malaysia) Man Wei Chong / Tee Kai Wun (first round)
7. (Malaysia) Goh Sze Fei / Nur Izzuddin (first round)
8. (Japan) Takuro Hoki / Yugo Kobayashi (second round)

=== Finals ===
Semi-finals
1	(South Korea) Kim Won-ho (South Korea) Seo Seung-jae	21	22
B1	(China) He Jiting (China) Ren Xiangyu	13	20
5	(Indonesia) Fajar Alfian (Indonesia) Muhammad Shohibul Fikri	13	21	16
(South Korea) Kang Min-hyuk (South Korea) Ki Dong-ju	21	14	21

Final
1	(South Korea) Kim Won-ho (South Korea) Seo Seung-jae	21	21
(South Korea) Kang Min-hyuk (South Korea) Ki Dong-ju	13	17

=== Top half ===
==== Section 1 ====
First round
1	(South Korea) Kim W-h (South Korea) Seo S-j	21	21
(India) H Amsakarunan (India) Arjun M. R.	15	7
(Chinese Taipei) Lee J-h (Chinese Taipei) Yang P-hs	21	15	16
(Singapore) W Koh (Singapore) J Kubo	18	21	21
7	(Malaysia) Goh S F (Malaysia) N Izzuddin	22	21	11
(Thailand) C Charoenkitamorn (Thailand) W Thongsa-nga	24	18	21
(Indonesia) A F Rayhan (Indonesia) D A Wahyudi	21	21
D1	(Philippines) S J Padiz (Philippines) J Villabrille	19	12

Second round
1	(South Korea) Kim W-h (South Korea) Seo S-j	21	25
(Singapore) W Koh (Singapore) J Kubo	12	23
(Thailand) C Charoenkitamorn (Thailand) W Thongsa-nga	20	21	15
(Indonesia) A F Rayhan (Indonesia) D A Wahyudi	22	15	21

Quarter-finals
1	(South Korea) Kim W-h (South Korea) Seo S-j	21	21
(Indonesia) A F Rayhan (Indonesia) D A Wahyudi	18	16

==== Section 2 ====
First round
3	(China) Liang WK (China) Wang C	w	/	o
(Chinese Taipei) Liu K-h (Chinese Taipei) Yang P-ha
(Japan) K Kumagai (Japan) H Nishi	20	21	22
PFQ	(Thailand) P Sukphun (Thailand) Pak Teeraratsakul	22	17	20
6	(Malaysia) Man W C (Malaysia) Tee K W	18	18
B1	(China) He JT (China) Ren XY	21	21
(Hong Kong) Hung K C (Hong Kong) Lui C W	21	24	19
PFQ	(Singapore) D Wee (Singapore) H Wong	18	26	21

Second round
3	(China) Liang WK (China) Wang C	15	21	21
(Japan) K Kumagai (Japan) H Nishi	21	15	14
B1	(China) He JT (China) Ren XY	21	21
PFQ	(Singapore) D Wee (Singapore) H Wong	14	10

Quarter-finals
3	(China) Liang WK (China) Wang C	19	15
B1	(China) He JT (China) Ren XY	21	21

=== Bottom half ===
==== Section 3 ====
First round
(Chinese Taipei) Lee F-c (Chinese Taipei) Lee F-j	21	17	22
(Malaysia) J Arif (Malaysia) Yap R K	17	21	20
(Thailand) P Kaosamaang (Thailand) T Punpanich	9	12
SWM	(Indonesia) S K Gutama (Indonesia) M R Isfahani	21	21
(China) Chen BY (China) Liu Y	21	21
(Japan) T Nomura (Japan) Y Shimogami	13	16
(United Arab Emirates) Dv Ayyappan (United Arab Emirates) Dh Ayyappan	12	9
5	(Indonesia) F Alfian (Indonesia) M S Fikri	21	21

Second round
(Chinese Taipei) Lee F-c (Chinese Taipei) Lee F-j	21	18	21
SWM	(Indonesia) S K Gutama (Indonesia) M R Isfahani	14	21	15
(China) Chen BY (China) Liu Y	17	23
5	(Indonesia) F Alfian (Indonesia) M S Fikri	21	25

Quarter-finals
(Chinese Taipei) Lee F-c (Chinese Taipei) Lee F-j	15	18
5	(Indonesia) F Alfian (Indonesia) M S Fikri	21	21

==== Section 4 ====
First round
(South Korea) Kang M-h (South Korea) Ki D-j	21	15	25
(Indonesia) R Indra (Indonesia) N Joaquin	11	21	23
A1	(Vietnam) Nguyễn Đ H (Vietnam) Trần Đ M	12	10
8	(Japan) T Hoki (Japan) Y Kobayashi	21	21
C1	(Hong Kong) Law C H (Hong Kong) Yeung S C	15	16
(China) Hu KY (China) Lin XY	21	21
(Chinese Taipei) Chiu H-c (Chinese Taipei) Wang C-l	15	15
2	(Malaysia) A Chia (Malaysia) Soh W Y	21	21

Second round
(South Korea) Kang M-h (South Korea) Ki D-j	21	19	21
8	(Japan) T Hoki (Japan) Y Kobayashi	18	21	11
(China) Hu KY (China) Lin XY	20	19
2	(Malaysia) A Chia (Malaysia) Soh W Y	22	21

Quarter-finals
(South Korea) Kang M-h (South Korea) Ki D-j	21	26	21
2	(Malaysia) A Chia (Malaysia) Soh W Y	19	28	13

== Women's doubles ==
=== Seeds ===
1. (China) Liu Shengshu / Tan Ning (final)
2. (Malaysia) Pearly Tan / Thinaah Muralitharan (quarter-finals)
3. (South Korea) Baek Ha-na / Lee So-hee (second round)
4. (China) Jia Yifan / Zhang Shuxian (second round)
5. (Japan) Yuki Fukushima / Mayu Matsumoto (semi-finals)
6. (Japan) Rin Iwanaga / Kie Nakanishi (quarter-finals)
7. (Chinese Taipei) Hsieh Pei-shan / Hung En-tzu (quarter-finals)
8. (China) Li Yijing / Luo Xumin (champions)

=== Finals ===
Semi-finals
1	(China) Liu Shengshu (China) Tan Ning	21	21
(Indonesia) Amallia Cahaya Pratiwi (Indonesia) Siti Fadia Silva Ramadhanti	10	12
5	(Japan) Yuki Fukushima (Japan) Mayu Matsumoto	17	17
8	(China) Li Yijing (China) Luo Xumin	21	21

Final
1	(China) Liu Shengshu (China) Tan Ning	5^{r}
8	(China) Li Yijing (China) Luo Xumin	8

=== Top half ===
==== Section 1 ====
First round
1	(China) Liu SS (China) Tan N	21	21
(Indonesia) F D Kusuma (Indonesia) M T Puspita Sari	11	19
(India) A Bhat (India) S Gautam	10	10
(Thailand) H Mijad (Thailand) N Tungkasatan	21	21
7	(Chinese Taipei) Hsieh P-s (Chinese Taipei) Hung E-t	21	21
D1	(Malaysia) Low Z Y (Malaysia) N Maisarah	12	16
(Japan) A Igarashi (Japan) C Shida	21	18	12
(Hong Kong) Yeung N T (Hong Kong) Yeung P L	11	21	21

Second round
1	(China) Liu SS (China) Tan N	21	18	21
(Thailand) H Mijad (Thailand) N Tungkasatan	13	21	10
7	(Chinese Taipei) Hsieh P-s (Chinese Taipei) Hung E-t	21	21
(Hong Kong) Yeung N T (Hong Kong) Yeung P L	12	15

Quarter-finals
1	(China) Liu SS (China) Tan N	21	21
7	(Chinese Taipei) Hsieh P-s (Chinese Taipei) Hung E-t	14	13

==== Section 2 ====
First round
3	(South Korea) Baek H-n (South Korea) Lee S-h	21	21
(Chinese Taipei) Hsu Y-c (Chinese Taipei) Sung Y-h	13	8
(Indonesia) A C Pratiwi (Indonesia) S F Ramadhanti	21	21
C1	(Singapore) Tay A J (Singapore) Teo E K	13	10
6	(Japan) R Iwanaga (Japan) K Nakanishi	13	23	21
(China) Luo Y (China) Wang TG	21	21	12
PFQ	(Malaysia) Chong J Y (Malaysia) V Ng	9	14
(Malaysia) Ong X Y (Malaysia) C Ting	21	21

Second round
3	(South Korea) Baek H-n (South Korea) Lee S-h	17	16
(Indonesia) A C Pratiwi (Indonesia) S F Ramadhanti	21	21
6	(Japan) R Iwanaga (Japan) K Nakanishi	21	21
(Malaysia) Ong X Y (Malaysia) C Ting	18	14

Quarter-finals
(Indonesia) A C Pratiwi (Indonesia) S F Ramadhanti	21	21
6	(Japan) R Iwanaga (Japan) K Nakanishi	12	16

=== Bottom half ===
==== Section 3 ====
First round
B1	(Vietnam) Phạm T D L (Vietnam) Phạm T K	15	21	13
(India) P Konjengbam (India) S Mishra	21	17	21
(Hong Kong) Lui L L (Hong Kong) Tsang H Y	9	17
5	(Japan) Y Fukushima (Japan) M Matsumoto	21	21
(Indonesia) R A Rose (Indonesia) F Setianingrum	19	21	21
(Chinese Taipei) Chang C-h (Chinese Taipei) Yang C-t	21	9	14
A1	(South Korea) Lee S-j (South Korea) Lee Y-w	16	12
4	(China) Jia YF (China) Zhang SX	21	21

Second round
(India) P Konjengbam (India) S Mishra	10	13
5	(Japan) Y Fukushima (Japan) M Matsumoto	21	21
(Indonesia) R A Rose (Indonesia) F Setianingrum	16	21	21
4	(China) Jia YF (China) Zhang SX	21	19	9

Quarter-finals
5	(Japan) Y Fukushima (Japan) M Matsumoto	21	21
(Indonesia) R A Rose (Indonesia) F Setianingrum	11	16

==== Section 4 ====
First round
(Japan) R Hirokami (Japan) S Hobara	21	21
PFQ	(Thailand) P Phatcharaphisutsin (Thailand) N Sukklad	11	4
(India) K Selvam (India) S Singhi	9	8
8	(China) Li YJ (China) Luo XM	21	21
(Chinese Taipei) Hsu Y-h (Chinese Taipei) Lin J-y	21	21
(Thailand) O Jongsathapornparn (Thailand) S Suwachai	12	13
(Hong Kong) Fan K Y (Hong Kong) Yau M Y	14	11
2	(Malaysia) P Tan (Malaysia) Thinaah M	21	21

Second round
(Japan) R Hirokami (Japan) S Hobara	14	10
8	(China) Li YJ (China) Luo XM	21	21
(Chinese Taipei) Hsu Y-h (Chinese Taipei) Lin J-y	19	21	22
2	(Malaysia) P Tan (Malaysia) Thinaah M	21	19	24

Quarter-finals
8	(China) Li YJ (China) Luo XM	21	21
2	(Malaysia) P Tan (Malaysia) Thinaah M	13	15

== Mixed doubles ==
=== Seeds ===
1. (China) Feng Yanzhe / Huang Dongping (semi-finals)
2. (China) Jiang Zhenbang / Wei Yaxin (withdrew)
3. (Thailand) Dechapol Puavaranukroh / Supissara Paewsampran (final)
4. (Malaysia) Chen Tang Jie / Toh Ee Wei (quarter-finals)
5. (Hong Kong) Tang Chun Man / Tse Ying Suet (first round)
6. (China) Guo Xinwa / Chen Fanghui (quarter-finals)
7. (Indonesia) Jafar Hidayatullah / Felisha Pasaribu (second round)
8. (Malaysia) Goh Soon Huat / Shevon Jemie Lai (second round)

=== Finals ===
Semi-finals
1	(China) Feng Yanzhe (China) Huang Dongping	19	21	20
3	(Thailand) Dechapol Puavaranukroh (Thailand) Supissara Paewsampran	21	18	22
(Japan) Yuta Watanabe (Japan) Maya Taguchi	18	11
D1	(South Korea) Kim Jae-hyeon (South Korea) Jang Ha-jeong	21	21

Final
3	(Thailand) Dechapol Puavaranukroh (Thailand) Supissara Paewsampran
D1	(South Korea) Kim Jae-hyeon (South Korea) Jang Ha-jeong	w	/	o

=== Top half ===
==== Section 1 ====
First round
1	(China) Feng YZ (China) Huang DP	21	21
(Thailand) Pak Teeraratsakul (Thailand) S Taerattanachai	5	13
(Indonesia) A Syahnawi (Indonesia) N V Marwah	19	21	22
(Japan) A Koga (Japan) N Saito	21	16	20
8	(Malaysia) Goh S H (Malaysia) S J Lai	21	21
(India) R Kapoor (India) R Gadde	13	19
B1	(Bangladesh) A Jumar (Bangladesh) U Akter	7	11
(Chinese Taipei) Chen C-k (Chinese Taipei) Hsu Y-h	21	21

Second round
1	(China) Feng YZ (China) Huang DP	21	21
(Indonesia) A Syahnawi (Indonesia) N V Marwah	10	15
8	(Malaysia) Goh S H (Malaysia) S J Lai	21	15	16
(Chinese Taipei) Chen C-k (Chinese Taipei) Hsu Y-h	10	21	21

Quarter-finals
1	(China) Feng YZ (China) Huang DP	21	21
(Chinese Taipei) Chen C-k (Chinese Taipei) Hsu Y-h	10	18

==== Section 2 ====
First round
3	(Thailand) D Puavaranukroh (Thailand) S Paewsampran	21	21
(Indonesia) B Setiabudi (Indonesia) M D Oktavianti	9	14
C1	(Vietnam) Trần Đ M (Vietnam) Phạm T K	5	4
(Japan) Y Shimogami (Japan) S Hobara	21	21
6	(China) Guo XW (China) Chen FH	21	21
(Chinese Taipei) Wu G-x (Chinese Taipei) Lee C-h	17	18
(Malaysia) Wong T C (Malaysia) Lim C S	21	21
(India) A Surya (India) A Pramuthesh	16	15

Second round
3	(Thailand) D Puavaranukroh (Thailand) S Paewsampran	21	21
(Japan) Y Shimogami (Japan) S Hobara	9	16
6	(China) Guo XW (China) Chen FH	21	21
(Malaysia) Wong T C (Malaysia) Lim C S	8	14

Quarter-finals
3	(Thailand) D Puavaranukroh (Thailand) S Paewsampran	19	21	21
6	(China) Guo XW (China) Chen FH	21	17	15

=== Bottom half ===
==== Section 3 ====
First round
(Japan) Y Watanabe (Japan) M Taguchi	21	21
A1	(Hong Kong) Hung K C (Hong Kong) Tsang H Y	8	16
(Indonesia) A Maulana (Indonesia) I C Jamil	16	18
SWM	(Chinese Taipei) Ye H-w (Chinese Taipei) N G Chan	21	21
PFQ	(Macau) Leong I C (Macau) Ng W C	3	14
(Chinese Taipei) Yang P-hs (Chinese Taipei) Hu L-f	21	21
(China) Cheng X (China) Zhang C	19	21	21
5	(Hong Kong) Tang C M (Hong Kong) Tse Y S	21	19	7

Second round
(Japan) Y Watanabe (Japan) M Taguchi	21	24
SWM	(Chinese Taipei) Ye H-w (Chinese Taipei) N G Chan	19	22
(Chinese Taipei) Yang P-hs (Chinese Taipei) Hu L-f	15	21	24
(China) Cheng X (China) Zhang C	21	15	22

Quarter-finals
(Japan) Y Watanabe (Japan) M Taguchi	26	21
(Chinese Taipei) Yang P-hs (Chinese Taipei) Hu L-f	24	16

==== Section 4 ====
First round
(Malaysia) Hoo P R (Malaysia) Cheng S Y	14	6^{r}
D1	(South Korea) Kim J-h (South Korea) Jang H-j	21	9
PFQ	(Hong Kong) Chan Y C (Hong Kong) Ng T Y	9	21	15
7	(Indonesia) J Hidayatullah (Indonesia) F Pasaribu	21	15	21
(Thailand) P Horbanluekit (Thailand) B Aimsaard	14	21	15
(India) D Kapila (India) T Crasto	21	11	21
(Japan) H Kawabe (Japan) K Ishikawa	10	19
4	(Malaysia) Chen T J (Malaysia) Toh E W	21	21

Second round
D1	(South Korea) Kim J-h (South Korea) Jang H-j	23	20	21
7	(Indonesia) J Hidayatullah (Indonesia) F Pasaribu	21	22	10
(India) D Kapila (India) T Crasto	13	14
4	(Malaysia) Chen T J (Malaysia) Toh E W	21	21

Quarter-finals
D1	(South Korea) Kim J-h (South Korea) Jang H-j	21	21
4	(Malaysia) Chen T J (Malaysia) Toh E W	19	17
