= 2024 German Open (badminton) =

Badminton tournament in Germany

Tournament details
- Dates: 27 February – 3 March
- Edition: 65th
- Level: Super 300
- Total prize money: US$210,000
- Venue: Westenergie Sporthalle
- Location: Mülheim, Germany

Champions
- Men's singles: (France) Christo Popov
- Women's singles: (Denmark) Mia Blichfeldt
- Men's doubles: (Chinese Taipei) Lee Jhe-huei (Chinese Taipei) Yang Po-hsuan
- Women's doubles: (China) Li Yijing (China) Luo Xumin
- Mixed doubles: (Hong Kong) Tang Chun Man (Hong Kong) Tse Ying Suet

The 2024 German Open (officially known as the Yonex German Open 2024 for sponsorship reasons) was a badminton tournament that took place at the Westenergie Sporthalle, Mülheim, Germany, from 27 February to 3 March 2024 and has a total prize of US$210,000.

== Tournament ==
The 2024 German Open was the fifth tournament of the 2024 BWF World Tour and was part of the German Open championships, which had been held since 1955. This tournament was organized by Vermarktungsgesellschaft Badminton Deutschland (VBD) mbH for the German Badminton Association with sanction from the BWF.

=== Venue ===
This tournament was held at the Westenergie Sporthalle in Mülheim, Germany.

=== Point distribution ===
Below is the point distribution table for each phase of the tournament based on the BWF points system for the BWF World Tour Super 300 event.

Winner	Runner-up	3/4	5/8	9/16	17/32	33/64	65/128
7,000	5,950	4,900	3,850	2,750	1,670	660	320

=== Prize pool ===
The total prize money is US$210,000 with the distribution of the prize money in accordance with BWF regulations.

Event	Winner	Finalist	Semi-finals	Quarter-finals	Last 16
Singles	$15,750	$7,980	$3,045	$1,260	$735
Doubles	$16,590	$7,980	$2,940	$1,522.5	$787.5

== Men's singles ==
=== Seeds ===
1. (Chinese Taipei) Chou Tien-chen (second round)
2. (Malaysia) Ng Tze Yong (withdrew)
3. (Chinese Taipei) Lin Chun-yi (quarter-finals)
4. (Hong Kong) Ng Ka Long (first round)
5. (Canada) Brian Yang (second round)
6. (France) Toma Junior Popov (first round)
7. (Chinese Taipei) Wang Tzu-wei (first round)
8. (France) Christo Popov (champion)

=== Finals ===
Semi-finals
(China) Zhao Junpeng	15	21	19
(Denmark) Rasmus Gemke	21	17	21
(South Korea) Jeon Hyeok-jin	17	21	11
8	(France) Christo Popov	21	11	21

Final
(Denmark) Rasmus Gemke	17	16
8	(France) Christo Popov	21	21

=== Top half ===
==== Section 1 ====
First round
1	(Chinese Taipei) Chou T-c	21	18	21
(Netherlands) M Caljouw	17	21	16
Q1	(Chinese Taipei) Liao J-f	11	21	16
(China) Zhao JP	21	12	21
5	(Canada) B Yang	15	21	21
Q3	(India) S Subramanian	21	18	13
(Belgium) J Carraggi	22	22	21
Q2	(Ukraine) D Bosniuk	24	20	13

Second round
1	(Chinese Taipei) Chou T-c	14	18
(China) Zhao JP	21	21
5	(Canada) B Yang	21	15	14
(Belgium) J Carraggi	16	21	21

Quarter-finals
(China) Zhao JP	18	21	21
(Belgium) J Carraggi	21	14	12

==== Section 2 ====
First round
3	(Chinese Taipei) Lin C-y	15	21	21
(Czech Republic) J Louda	21	19	14
(Denmark) M Johannesen	21	18	15
(Thailand) K Wangcharoen	15	21	21
6	(France) T J Popov	21	16	11
(France) A Lanier	18	21	21
(Denmark) R Gemke	21	21
PFQ	(Spain) P Abián	13	13

Second round
3	(Chinese Taipei) Lin C-y	21	17	21
(Thailand) K Wangcharoen	15	21	3
(France) A Lanier	21	11	18
(Denmark) R Gemke	16	21	21

Quarter-finals
3	(Chinese Taipei) Lin C-y	16	21	16
(Denmark) R Gemke	21	17	21

=== Bottom half ===
==== Section 3 ====
First round
(India) S K Karunakaran	21	19	21
(Israel) M Zilberman	18	21	19
(Republic of Ireland) N Nguyen	21	11
7	(Chinese Taipei) Wang T-w	7	5^{r}
PFQ	(Malaysia) Cheam J W	19	14
Q4	(France) L Claerbout	21	21
(South Korea) Jeon H-j	21	21
4	(Hong Kong) Ng K L	17	16

Second round
(India) S K Karunakaran	18	22
(Republic of Ireland) N Nguyen	21	24
Q4	(France) L Claerbout	17	16
(South Korea) Jeon H-j	21	21

Quarter-finals
(Republic of Ireland) N Nguyen	21	17	17
(South Korea) Jeon H-j	18	21	21

==== Section 4 ====
First round
(Chinese Taipei) Lee C-h	21	21
(France) A Merklé	17	18
(Denmark) M Christophersen	17	18
8	(France) C Popov	21	21
(Chinese Taipei) Su L-y	21	21
(Chinese Taipei) Huang Y-k	18	18
(Finland) K Koljonen	21	21
PFQ	(Azerbaijan) A R Dwicahyo	10	11

Second round
(Chinese Taipei) Lee C-h	20	13
8	(France) C Popov	22	21
(Chinese Taipei) Su L-y	21	21
(Finland) K Koljonen	18	16

Quarter-finals
8	(France) C Popov	21	22	21
(Chinese Taipei) Su L-y	19	24	17

== Women's singles ==
=== Seeds ===
1. (South Korea) An Se-young (withdrew)
2. (South Korea) Kim Ga-eun (semi-finals)
3. (Thailand) Ratchanok Intanon (quarter-finals)
4. (Thailand) Pornpawee Chochuwong (second round)
5. (Thailand) Supanida Katethong (quarter-finals)
6. (Denmark) Mia Blichfeldt (champion)
7. (Vietnam) Nguyễn Thùy Linh (final)
8. (Scotland) Kirsty Gilmour (second round)

=== Finals ===
Semi-finals
6	(Denmark) Mia Blichfeldt	21	18	21
(Canada) Michelle Li	13	21	10
7	(Vietnam) Nguyễn Thùy Linh	20	21	21
2	(South Korea) Kim Ga-eun	22	8	16

Final
6	(Denmark) Mia Blichfeldt	21	21
7	(Vietnam) Nguyễn Thùy Linh	11	9

=== Top half ===
==== Section 1 ====
First round
PFQ	(Republic of Ireland) R Darragh	11	16
(Chinese Taipei) Pai Y-p	21	21
(Chinese Taipei) Sung S-y	21	15	21
Q3	(Hong Kong) Lo S Y	17	21	15
6	(Denmark) M Blichfeldt	21	21
(Azerbaijan) K F Azzahra	12	10
Q4	(Ukraine) P Buhrova	23	17	11
(India) A Kashyap	21	21	21

Second round
(Chinese Taipei) Pai Y-p	9	12
(Chinese Taipei) Sung S-y	21	21
6	(Denmark) M Blichfeldt	21	21
(India) A Kashyap	13	14

Quarter-finals
(Chinese Taipei) Sung S-y	14	11
6	(Denmark) M Blichfeldt	21	21

==== Section 2 ====
First round
4	(Thailand) P Chochuwong	21	21
(Germany) Y Li	18	18
(Canada) M Li	21	21
(Canada) W Y Zhang	18	11
8	(Scotland) K Gilmour	21	21
(Denmark) J D Jakobsen	13	12
(France) Qi XF	21	21
(Switzerland) J Stadelmann	9	12

Second round
4	(Thailand) P Chochuwong	19	18
(Canada) M Li	21	21
8	(Scotland) K Gilmour	21	20	21
(France) Qi XF	19	22	23

Quarter-finals
(Canada) M Li	21	21
(France) Qi XF	13	11

=== Bottom half ===
==== Section 3 ====
First round
(United States) L Lam	21	21
(Belgium) L Tan	13	15
PFQ	(Bulgaria) K Nalbantova	7	11
7	(Vietnam) Nguyễn T L	21	21
(Spain) C Azurmendi	14	21	6
(United States) I Wang	21	14	21
(India) T Hemanth	15	13
3	(Thailand) R Intanon	21	21

Second round
(United States) L Lam	14	7
7	(Vietnam) Nguyễn T L	21	21
(United States) I Wang	18	13
3	(Thailand) R Intanon	21	21

Quarter-finals
7	(Vietnam) Nguyễn T L	21	21
3	(Thailand) R Intanon	13	15

==== Section 4 ====
First round
Q1	(Czech Republic) T Švábíková	19	21	21
(Peru) I Castillo	21	5	19
(Chinese Taipei) Hsu W-c	15	21	13
5	(Thailand) S Katethong	21	14	21
PFQ	(France) L Huet	21	18	21
(Myanmar) Thet Htar T	15	21	17
Q2	(Denmark) A Schulz	13	13
2	(South Korea) Kim G-e	21	21

Second round
Q1	(Czech Republic) T Švábíková	9	12
5	(Thailand) S Katethong	21	21
PFQ	(France) L Huet	15	8
2	(South Korea) Kim G-e	21	21

Quarter-finals
5	(Thailand) S Katethong	15	10
2	(South Korea) Kim G-e	21	21

== Men's doubles ==
=== Seeds ===
1. (Malaysia) Ong Yew Sin / Teo Ee Yi (semi-finals)
2. (Chinese Taipei) Lee Jhe-huei / Yang Po-hsuan (champions)
3. (China) He Jiting / Ren Xiangyu (final)
4. (Denmark) Rasmus Kjær / Frederik Søgaard (semi-finals)
5. (Chinese Taipei) Lu Ching-yao / Yang Po-han (quarter-finals)
6. (Germany) Mark Lamsfuß / Marvin Seidel (quarter-finals)
7. (Scotland) Alexander Dunn / Adam Hall (second round)
8. (Thailand) Supak Jomkoh / Kittinupong Kedren (quarter-finals)

=== Finals ===
Semi-finals
1	(Malaysia) Ong Yew Sin (Malaysia) Teo Ee Yi	5	15
3	(China) He Jiting (China) Ren Xiangyu	21	21
4	(Denmark) Rasmus Kjær (Denmark) Frederik Søgaard	20	11
2	(Chinese Taipei) Lee Jhe-huei (Chinese Taipei) Yang Po-hsuan	22	21

Final
3	(China) He Jiting (China) Ren Xiangyu	21	21	21
2	(Chinese Taipei) Lee Jhe-huei (Chinese Taipei) Yang Po-hsuan	15	23	23

=== Top half ===
==== Section 1 ====
First round
1	(Malaysia) Ong Y S (Malaysia) Teo E Y	21	21
(France) É Adam (France) L Rossi	13	14
(Denmark) D Lundgaard (Denmark) M Vestergaard	26	18	21
(Chinese Taipei) Chen C-k (Chinese Taipei) Chen S-f	24	21	14
5	(Chinese Taipei) Lu C-y (Chinese Taipei) Yang P-ha	21	21
(Norway) T Flåtten (Norway) V Rikheim	16	18
(Scotland) C Grimley (Scotland) M Grimley	21	17	21
(Denmark) W K Boe (Denmark) C F Kjær	19	21	16

Second round
1	(Malaysia) Ong Y S (Malaysia) Teo E Y	21	19	21
(Denmark) D Lundgaard (Denmark) M Vestergaard	14	21	10
5	(Chinese Taipei) Lu C-y (Chinese Taipei) Yang P-ha	21	21
(Scotland) C Grimley (Scotland) M Grimley	16	17

Quarter-finals
1	(Malaysia) Ong Y S (Malaysia) Teo E Y	21	21
5	(Chinese Taipei) Lu C-y (Chinese Taipei) Yang P-ha	19	10

==== Section 2 ====
First round
3	(China) He JT (China) Ren XY	21	21
Q2	(Czech Republic) V Kulíšek (Czech Republic) T Švejda	4	6
(Mexico) J Castillo (Mexico) L Montoya	21	21
(Bulgaria) I Rusev (Bulgaria) I Stoynov	17	15
6	(Germany) M Lamsfuß (Germany) M Seidel	14	21	21
(Germany) B Geiss (Germany) J C Völker	21	13	17
Q1	(Germany) M Datko (Germany) J Schlevoigt	16	17
(Denmark) A Søndergaard (Denmark) J Toft	21	21

Second round
3	(China) He JT (China) Ren XY	21	21
(Mexico) J Castillo (Mexico) L Montoya	14	10
6	(Germany) M Lamsfuß (Germany) M Seidel	18	21	21
(Denmark) A Søndergaard (Denmark) J Toft	21	19	18

Quarter-finals
3	(China) He JT (China) Ren XY	15	22	21
6	(Germany) M Lamsfuß (Germany) M Seidel	21	20	15

=== Bottom half ===
==== Section 3 ====
First round
(France) L Corvée (France) R Labar	16	14
(Chinese Taipei) Chang K-c (Chinese Taipei) Po L-w	21	21
(Republic of Ireland) J Magee (Republic of Ireland) P Reynolds	13	18
7	(Scotland) A Dunn (Scotland) A Hall	21	21
Q4	(Denmark) M Gadegaard (Denmark) O Geisler	18	10
(Czech Republic) O Král (Czech Republic) A Mendrek	21	21
Q3	(Netherlands) T van der Lecq (Netherlands) B Wassink	21	10	17
4	(Denmark) R Kjær (Denmark) F Søgaard	16	21	21

Second round
(Chinese Taipei) Chang K-c (Chinese Taipei) Po L-w	21	21
7	(Scotland) A Dunn (Scotland) A Hall	15	12
(Czech Republic) O Král (Czech Republic) A Mendrek	19	14
4	(Denmark) R Kjær (Denmark) F Søgaard	21	21

Quarter-finals
(Chinese Taipei) Chang K-c (Chinese Taipei) Po L-w	7	21
4	(Denmark) R Kjær (Denmark) F Søgaard	21	23

==== Section 4 ====
First round
(France) C Popov (France) T J Popov	21	21
(Canada) A Dong (Canada) N Yakura	18	14
(Germany) J R Jansen (Germany) K Neumann	14	16
8	(Thailand) S Jomkoh (Thailand) K Kedren	21	21
(United States) V Chiu (United States) J Yuan	12	21	15
(Denmark) R Espersen (Denmark) M Rindshøj	21	19	21
(Germany) D Hess (Germany) P Scheiel	6	15
2	(Chinese Taipei) Lee J-h (Chinese Taipei) Yang P-hs	21	21

Second round
(France) C Popov (France) T J Popov	19	14
8	(Thailand) S Jomkoh (Thailand) K Kedren	21	21
(Denmark) R Espersen (Denmark) M Rindshøj	18	11
2	(Chinese Taipei) Lee J-h (Chinese Taipei) Yang P-hs	21	21

Quarter-finals
8	(Thailand) S Jomkoh (Thailand) K Kedren	12	17
2	(Chinese Taipei) Lee J-h (Chinese Taipei) Yang P-hs	21	21

== Women's doubles ==
=== Seeds ===
1. (Hong Kong) Yeung Nga Ting / Yeung Pui Lam (quarter-finals)
2. (Denmark) Maiken Fruergaard / Sara Thygesen (quarter-finals)
3. (France) Margot Lambert / Anne Tran (semi-finals)
4. (India) Treesa Jolly / Gayatri Gopichand (quarter-finals)
5. (Bulgaria) Gabriela Stoeva / Stefani Stoeva (final)
6. (China) Li Yijing / Luo Xumin (champions)
7. (Chinese Taipei) Hsu Ya-ching / Lin Wan-ching (semi-finals)
8. (United States) Annie Xu / Kerry Xu (first round)

=== Finals ===
Semi-finals
5	(Bulgaria) Gabriela Stoeva (Bulgaria) Stefani Stoeva	21	21
3	(France) Margot Lambert (France) Anne Tran	14	18
6	(China) Li Yijing (China) Luo Xumin	21	21
7	(Chinese Taipei) Hsu Ya-ching (Chinese Taipei) Lin Wan-ching	17	18

Final
5	(Bulgaria) Gabriela Stoeva (Bulgaria) Stefani Stoeva	7	21	18
6	(China) Li Yijing (China) Luo Xumin	21	13	21

=== Top half ===
==== Section 1 ====
First round
1	(Hong Kong) Yeung N T (Hong Kong) Yeung P L	17	23	21
(Denmark) A C Kudsk (Denmark) S Schulz	21	21	8
(United States) P L Cao Hok (United States) L Lam	21	21
PFQ	(Ukraine) V Frolova (Ukraine) S Lavrova	16	10
5	(Bulgaria) G Stoeva (Bulgaria) S Stoeva	21	21
(Turkey) B Erçetin (Turkey) N İnci	19	9
(Malaysia) V Hoo (Malaysia) Lim C S	21	21
(Austria) S Au Yeong (Austria) K Hochmeir	9	13

Second round
1	(Hong Kong) Yeung N T (Hong Kong) Yeung P L	21	19	21
(United States) P L Cao Hok (United States) L Lam	12	21	12
5	(Bulgaria) G Stoeva (Bulgaria) S Stoeva	21	21
(Malaysia) V Hoo (Malaysia) Lim C S	16	14

Quarter-finals
1	(Hong Kong) Yeung N T (Hong Kong) Yeung P L	17	15
5	(Bulgaria) G Stoeva (Bulgaria) S Stoeva	21	21

==== Section 2 ====
First round
3	(France) M Lambert (France) A Tran	21	21
(Germany) J Meyer (Germany) L Michalski	15	14
Q1	(Germany) A Lehmann (Germany) C Siebrecht	21	10	21
(India) R Panda (India) S Panda	17	21	14
8	(United States) A Xu (United States) K Xu	13	21	12
(Scotland) J MacPherson (Scotland) C Torrance	21	14	21
(Denmark) N P Anthonisen (Netherlands) A Tirtosentono	21	21
(Netherlands) K de Wit (Netherlands) K van Buiten	14	13

Second round
3	(France) M Lambert (France) A Tran	21	21
Q1	(Germany) A Lehmann (Germany) C Siebrecht	13	9
(Scotland) J MacPherson (Scotland) C Torrance	10	11
(Denmark) N P Anthonisen (Netherlands) A Tirtosentono	21	21

Quarter-finals
3	(France) M Lambert (France) A Tran	21	21
(Denmark) N P Anthonisen (Netherlands) A Tirtosentono	11	13

=== Bottom half ===
==== Section 3 ====
First round
(United States) F Corbett (United States) A Lee	21	21
PFQ	(Latvia) A Kupča (Latvia) J Romanova	7	14
Q4	(Germany) N Becker (Germany) L Marburger	4	3
6	(China) Li YJ (China) Luo XM	21	21
Q3	(Austria) A Hagspiel (Austria) L Rumpold	19	12
PFQ	(Czech Republic) S Hořínková (Czech Republic) K Zuzáková	21	21
(Chinese Taipei) Hsu Y-h (Chinese Taipei) Lin J-y	21	11	13
4	(India) T Jolly (India) G Gopichand	18	21	21

Second round
(United States) F Corbett (United States) A Lee	15	15
6	(China) Li YJ (China) Luo XM	21	21
PFQ	(Czech Republic) S Hořínková (Czech Republic) K Zuzáková	10	11
4	(India) T Jolly (India) G Gopichand	21	21

Quarter-finals
6	(China) Li YJ (China) Luo XM	21	21
4	(India) T Jolly (India) G Gopichand	16	14

==== Section 4 ====
First round
(Germany) L Efler (Germany) I Lohau	21	21
(Mexico) H Gaitán (Mexico) S Solís	13	14
(Chinese Taipei) Sung S-y (Chinese Taipei) Yu C-h	22	14	14
7	(Chinese Taipei) Hsu Y-c (Chinese Taipei) Lin W-c	20	21	21
(Netherlands) D Jille (Netherlands) C Seinen	21	21
Q2	(Ukraine) P Buhrova (Ukraine) Y Kantemyr	13	15
(Australia) T Ho (Australia) G Somerville	14	8
2	(Denmark) M Fruergaard (Denmark) S Thygesen	21	21

Second round
(Germany) L Efler (Germany) I Lohau	14	12
7	(Chinese Taipei) Hsu Y-c (Chinese Taipei) Lin W-c	21	21
(Netherlands) D Jille (Netherlands) C Seinen	16	13
2	(Denmark) M Fruergaard (Denmark) S Thygesen	21	21

Quarter-finals
7	(Chinese Taipei) Hsu Y-c (Chinese Taipei) Lin W-c	13	21	22
2	(Denmark) M Fruergaard (Denmark) S Thygesen	21	16	20

== Mixed doubles ==
=== Seeds ===
1. (Thailand) Dechapol Puavaranukroh / Sapsiree Taerattanachai (quarter-finals)
2. (South Korea) Kim Won-ho / Jeong Na-eun (final)
3. (Hong Kong) Tang Chun Man / Tse Ying Suet (champions)
4. (Malaysia) Goh Soon Huat / Shevon Jemie Lai (quarter-finals)
5. (Netherlands) Robin Tabeling / Selena Piek (semi-finals)
6. (Thailand) Supak Jomkoh / Supissara Paewsampran (second round)
7. (Indonesia) Rehan Naufal Kusharjanto / Lisa Ayu Kusumawati (semi-finals)
8. (Indonesia) Rinov Rivaldy / Pitha Haningtyas Mentari (second round)

=== Finals ===
Semi-finals
5	(Netherlands) Robin Tabeling (Netherlands) Selena Piek	21	16	21
3	(Hong Kong) Tang Chun Man (Hong Kong) Tse Ying Suet	15	21	23
7	(Indonesia) Rehan Naufal Kusharjanto (Indonesia) Lisa Ayu Kusumawati	5	14
2	(South Korea) Kim Won-ho (South Korea) Jeong Na-eun	21	21

Final
3	(Hong Kong) Tang Chun Man (Hong Kong) Tse Ying Suet	21	21
2	(South Korea) Kim Won-ho (South Korea) Jeong Na-eun	13	19

=== Top half ===
==== Section 1 ====
First round
1	(Thailand) D Puavaranukroh (Thailand) S Taerattanachai	21	21
(Denmark) J Toft (Denmark) C Graversen	9	15
Q1	(Germany) D Hess (Germany) J Meyer	21	13
(Germany) J C Völker (Germany) S Küspert	23	21
5	(Netherlands) R Tabeling (Netherlands) S Piek	21	17	23
(Indonesia) D Ferdinansyah (Indonesia) G E Widjaja	19	21	21
(Israel) M Zilberman (Israel) S Zilberman	9	8
Q4	(Netherlands) T van der Lecq (Netherlands) A Tirtosentono	21	21

Second round
1	(Thailand) D Puavaranukroh (Thailand) S Taerattanachai	19
(Germany) J C Völker (Germany) S Küspert	14^{r}
5	(Netherlands) R Tabeling (Netherlands) S Piek	21	17	21
Q4	(Netherlands) T van der Lecq (Netherlands) A Tirtosentono	12	21	7

Quarter-finals
1	(Thailand) D Puavaranukroh (Thailand) S Taerattanachai	18	15
5	(Netherlands) R Tabeling (Netherlands) S Piek	21	21

==== Section 2 ====
First round
3	(Hong Kong) Tang C M (Hong Kong) Tse Y S	23	21
(India) S K Karunakaran (India) A Variyath	21	17
(Germany) M Lamsfuß (Germany) I Lohau	21	21
(Germany) J R Jansen (Germany) T P Nguyen	12	16
8	(Indonesia) R Rivaldy (Indonesia) P H Mentari	21	21
Q2	(Germany) D Eckerlin (Germany) A Lehmann	5	14
(Malaysia) Tan K M (Malaysia) Lai P J	24	20	21
(England) G Mairs (England) J Mairs	22	22	19

Second round
3	(Hong Kong) Tang C M (Hong Kong) Tse Y S	21	15	21
(Germany) M Lamsfuß (Germany) I Lohau	18	21	14
8	(Indonesia) R Rivaldy (Indonesia) P H Mentari	17	19
(Malaysia) Tan K M (Malaysia) Lai P J	21	21

Quarter-finals
3	(Hong Kong) Tang C M (Hong Kong) Tse Y S	13	21	21
(Malaysia) Tan K M (Malaysia) Lai P J	21	13	11

=== Bottom half ===
==== Section 3 ====
First round
(Australia) K Choo (Australia) G Somerville	21	21
Q3	(Chinese Taipei) Chen C-k (Chinese Taipei) Hsu Y-h	18	15
(Scotland) A Hall (Scotland) J MacPherson	20	9
7	(Indonesia) R N Kusharjanto (Indonesia) L A Kusumawati	22	21
(Singapore) T Hee (Singapore) J Tan	21	11	21
(Denmark) R Espersen (Denmark) A C Kudsk	18	21	14
(India) A Surya (India) A Pramuthesh	12	11
4	(Malaysia) Goh S H (Malaysia) S J Lai	21	21

Second round
(Australia) K Choo (Australia) G Somerville	14	11
7	(Indonesia) R N Kusharjanto (Indonesia) L A Kusumawati	21	21
(Singapore) T Hee (Singapore) J Tan	21	15	8
4	(Malaysia) Goh S H (Malaysia) S J Lai	8	21	21

Quarter-finals
7	(Indonesia) R N Kusharjanto (Indonesia) L A Kusumawati	21	28
4	(Malaysia) Goh S H (Malaysia) S J Lai	19	26

==== Section 4 ====
First round
(Chinese Taipei) Yang P-hs (Chinese Taipei) Hu L-f	21	19	17
(Chinese Taipei) Chang K-c (Chinese Taipei) Lee C-c	10	21	21
(United States) V Chiu (United States) J Gai	10	19
6	(Thailand) S Jomkoh (Thailand) S Paewsampran	21	21
(Denmark) M Vestergaard (Denmark) C Busch	22	21
PFQ	(Germany) P Scheiel (Germany) F Volkmann	20	17
(Hong Kong) Lee C H (Hong Kong) Ng T Y	10	14
2	(South Korea) Kim W-h (South Korea) Jeong N-e	21	21

Second round
(Chinese Taipei) Chang K-c (Chinese Taipei) Lee C-c	21	21
6	(Thailand) S Jomkoh (Thailand) S Paewsampran	18	14
(Denmark) M Vestergaard (Denmark) C Busch	21	20	14
2	(South Korea) Kim W-h (South Korea) Jeong N-e	19	22	21

Quarter-finals
(Chinese Taipei) Chang K-c (Chinese Taipei) Lee C-c	21	9
2	(South Korea) Kim W-h (South Korea) Jeong N-e	23	21

Preceded by 2024 Thailand Masters	BWF World Tour; 2024 BWF season	Succeeded by 2024 French Open
