= 2026 BWF World Championships – Women's doubles =

Badminton championships

Women's doubles at the 2026 BWF World Championships
- Venue: Indira Gandhi Arena
- Location: New Delhi, India
- Dates: 17–23 August
- Competitors: 48 from 29 nations

Medalists
gold medal	Baek Ha-na; Lee So-hee	South Korea
silver medal	Liu Shengshu; Tan Ning	China
bronze medal	Treesa Jolly; Gayatri Gopichand	India
bronze medal	Li Yijing; Luo Xumin	China

The Women's doubles tournament of the 2026 BWF World Championships took place from 17 to 23 August 2026 at the Indira Gandhi Arena in New Delhi.

== Seeds ==
The seeding list was based on the World Rankings of 31 July 2026.

1. (China) Liu Shengshu / Tan Ning (final)
2. (Japan) Yuki Fukushima / Mayu Matsumoto (third round)
3. (South Korea) Baek Ha-na / Lee So-hee (champions)
4. (China) Jia Yifan / Zhang Shuxian (quarter-finals)
5. (Malaysia) Pearly Tan / Thinaah Muralitharan (third round)
6. (South Korea) Kim Hye-jeong / Kong Hee-yong (withdrew)
7. (Japan) Rin Iwanaga / Kie Nakanishi (third round)
8. (China) Li Yijing / Luo Xumin (semi-finals)
9. (Bulgaria) Gabriela Stoeva / Stefani Stoeva (third round)
10. (Chinese Taipei) Hsieh Pei-shan / Hung En-tzu (third round)
11. (Chinese Taipei) Hsu Yin-hui / Lin Jhih-yun (third round)
12. (Indonesia) Rachel Allessya Rose / Febi Setianingrum (quarter-finals)
13. (Indonesia) Febriana Dwipuji Kusuma / Meilysa Trias Puspita Sari (quarter-finals)
14. (Japan) Rui Hirokami / Sayaka Hobara (third round)
15. (Chinese Taipei) Hsu Ya-ching / Sung Yu-hsuan (third round)
16. (United States) Lauren Lam / Allison Lee (second round)

== Draw ==
The drawing ceremony was held on 5 August.

=== Finals ===
Semi-finals
1	(China) Liu Shengshu (China) Tan Ning	18	21	21
(India) Treesa Jolly (India) Gayatri Gopichand	21	13	8
3	(South Korea) Baek Ha-na (South Korea) Lee So-hee	21	21
8	(China) Li Yijing (China) Luo Xumin	17	12

Final
1	(China) Liu Shengshu (China) Tan Ning	15	15
3	(South Korea) Baek Ha-na (South Korea) Lee So-hee	21	21

=== Top half ===
==== Section 1 ====
First round
(Vietnam) Phạm T D L (Vietnam) Phạm T K	21	10	21
(Canada) E Kwan (Canada) J Rymes	15	21	6
(Spain) N Carulla (Spain) C M Jiménez	20	14
(India) K Selvam (India) S Singhi	22	21
(Chinese Taipei) Chang C-h (Chinese Taipei) Yang C-t	21	21
(Brazil) J Lima (Brazil) S Lima	6	15
(United States) F Corbett (United States) J Gai	21	21
(Australia) J Lam (Australia) Lim Y Y	6	13

Second round
1	(China) Liu SS (China) Tan N	21	21
(Vietnam) Phạm T D L (Vietnam) Phạm T K	10	11
9	(Bulgaria) G Stoeva (Bulgaria) S Stoeva	21	21
(India) K Selvam (India) S Singhi	7	14
11	(Chinese Taipei) Hsu Y-h (Chinese Taipei) Lin J-y	24	21
(Chinese Taipei) Chang C-h (Chinese Taipei) Yang C-t	22	14
SWM	(Hong Kong) Yeung N T (Hong Kong) Yeung P L	21	21
(United States) F Corbett (United States) J Gai	16	17

Third round
1	(China) Liu SS (China) Tan N	21	21
9	(Bulgaria) G Stoeva (Bulgaria) S Stoeva	16	18
11	(Chinese Taipei) Hsu Y-h (Chinese Taipei) Lin J-y	18	16
SWM	(Hong Kong) Yeung N T (Hong Kong) Yeung P L	21	21

Quarter-finals
1	(China) Liu SS (China) Tan N	21	21
SWM	(Hong Kong) Yeung N T (Hong Kong) Yeung P L	14	17

==== Section 2 ====
First round
(Hong Kong) Lui L L (Hong Kong) Tsang H Y	21	21
(Italy) M Corsini (Italy) E Piccinin	16	14
(South Africa) A Ackerman (South Africa) J Scholtz	20	21	21
(Switzerland) A Müller (Netherlands) K van Buiten	22	17	17
(Thailand) H Mijad (Thailand) N Tungkasatan	21	21
(Netherlands) K de Wit (Netherlands) M Loos	19	13
(India) T Jolly (India) G Gopichand	21	21
(Spain) P López (Spain) L Rodríguez	9	13

Second round
4	(China) Jia YF (China) Zhang SX	21	21
(Hong Kong) Lui L L (Hong Kong) Tsang H Y	13	10
10	(Chinese Taipei) Hsieh P-s (Chinese Taipei) Hung E-t	21	21
(South Africa) A Ackerman (South Africa) J Scholtz	15	7
7	(Japan) R Iwanaga (Japan) K Nakanishi	21	21
(Thailand) H Mijad (Thailand) N Tungkasatan	15	14
16	(United States) L Lam (United States) A Lee	15	12
(India) T Jolly (India) G Gopichand	21	21

Third round
4	(China) Jia YF (China) Zhang SX	21	21
10	(Chinese Taipei) Hsieh P-s (Chinese Taipei) Hung E-t	11	18
7	(Japan) R Iwanaga (Japan) K Nakanishi	16	12
(India) T Jolly (India) G Gopichand	21	21

Quarter-finals
4	(China) Jia YF (China) Zhang SX	21	15	13
(India) T Jolly (India) G Gopichand	16	21	21

=== Bottom half ===
==== Section 3 ====
First round
(Sweden) F Hallberg (Sweden) E Öhling	16	21	13
(Turkey) Y Bektaş (Turkey) S Yıldız	21	18	21
(United Arab Emirates) M O Khan (United Arab Emirates) T Khan	12	9
(Turkey) B Erçetin (Turkey) N İnci	21	21
PFR	(China) Luo Y (China) Wang TG	21	21
(Denmark) K Vang (Denmark) M Werge	11	15
(Austria) S Dlapka (Austria) L Rumpold	5	7
(Japan) K Osawa (Japan) M Tanabe	21	21

Second round
(Turkey) Y Bektaş (Turkey) S Yıldız	12	14
13	(Indonesia) F D Kusuma (Indonesia) M T Puspita Sari	21	21
(Turkey) B Erçetin (Turkey) N İnci	16	13
5	(Malaysia) P Tan (Malaysia) Thinaah M	21	21
PFR	(China) Luo Y (China) Wang TG	11	21	6
14	(Japan) R Hirokami (Japan) S Hobara	21	19	21
(Japan) K Osawa (Japan) M Tanabe	18	8
3	(South Korea) Baek H-n (South Korea) Lee S-h	21	21

Third round
13	(Indonesia) F D Kusuma (Indonesia) M T Puspita Sari	20	21	21
5	(Malaysia) P Tan (Malaysia) Thinaah M	22	18	12
14	(Japan) R Hirokami (Japan) S Hobara	21	13	9
3	(South Korea) Baek H-n (South Korea) Lee S-h	8	21	21

Quarter-finals
13	(Indonesia) F D Kusuma (Indonesia) M T Puspita Sari	11	11
3	(South Korea) Baek H-n (South Korea) Lee S-h	21	21

==== Section 4 ====
First round
(Canada) J Dent (Canada) C Lai	18	21	17
(Thailand) P Aiamvareesrisakul (Thailand) S Janpeng	21	19	21
(Egypt) N A Youssri (Egypt) D Hany	11	14
(Poland) P Cybulska (Poland) K Marczak	21	21
PFR	(Indonesia) I S Meida (Indonesia) R K Nastine	21	21
(Scotland) J MacPherson (Scotland) C Torrance	12	18
(Malaysia) Ong X Y (Malaysia) C Ting	21	21
(Ukraine) P Buhrova (Ukraine) Y Kantemyr	17	12

Second round
(Thailand) P Aiamvareesrisakul (Thailand) S Janpeng	14	14
15	(Chinese Taipei) Hsu Y-c (Chinese Taipei) Sung Y-h	21	21
(Poland) P Cybulska (Poland) K Marczak	8	10
8	(China) Li YJ (China) Luo XM	21	21
PFR	(Indonesia) I S Meida (Indonesia) R K Nastine	11	10
12	(Indonesia) R A Rose (Indonesia) F Setianingrum	21	21
(Malaysia) Ong X Y (Malaysia) C Ting	15	15
2	(Japan) Y Fukushima (Japan) M Matsumoto	21	21

Third round
15	(Chinese Taipei) Hsu Y-c (Chinese Taipei) Sung Y-h	13	15
8	(China) Li YJ (China) Luo XM	21	21
12	(Indonesia) R A Rose (Indonesia) F Setianingrum	21	6
2	(Japan) Y Fukushima (Japan) M Matsumoto	9	11^{r}

Quarter-finals
8	(China) Li YJ (China) Luo XM	21	21
12	(Indonesia) R A Rose (Indonesia) F Setianingrum	13	14
