= 2019 Badminton Asia Junior Championships – Girls' doubles =

Tournament details
- Dates: 24 – 28 July 2019
- Edition: 22
- Venue: Suzhou Olympic Sports Centre
- Location: Suzhou, China

The girls' doubles tournament of the 2019 Badminton Asia Junior Championships will be held from 24 to 28 July. Febriana Dwipuji Kusuma / Ribka Sugiarto from Indonesia clinched this title in the last edition.

== Seeds ==
Seeds were announced on 2 July.

1. (Indonesia) Nita Violina Marwah / Putri Syaikah (second round)
2. (China) Li Yijing / Luo Xumin (champions)
3. (Indonesia) Febriana Dwipuji Kusuma / Amalia Cahaya Pratiwi (second round)
4. (China) Lin Fangling / Zhou Xinru (semifinals)

== Draw ==
=== Finals ===
Quarterfinals
(China) Chen Yingxue (China) Zhang Chi	21	21
(South Korea) Ji Young-bin (South Korea) Lee Eun-ji	19	17
4	(China) Lin Fangling (China) Zhou Xinru	21	21
(South Korea) Kim Ga-lam (South Korea) Kim So-jung	14	12
(China) Yang Jiayi (China) Zhang Jinger	11	21	18
(China) Guo Lizhi (China) Keng Shuliang	21	17	21
(India) Aditi Bhatt (India) Tanisha Crasto	7	16
2	(China) Li Yijing (China) Luo Xumin	21	21

Semifinals
(China) Chen Yingxue (China) Zhang Chi	25	21
4	(China) Lin Fangling (China) Zhou Xinru	23	18
(China) Guo Lizhi (China) Keng Shuliang	15	21	20
2	(China) Li Yijing (China) Luo Xumin	21	18	22

Final
(China) Chen Yingxue (China) Zhang Chi	17	17
2	(China) Li Yijing (China) Luo Xumin	21	21

=== Top half ===
==== Section 1 ====
First round
(China) Chen YX (China) Zhang C	21	21
(Malaysia) Low Y Y (Malaysia) V Siow	14	19
(Singapore) J Koh Y H (Singapore) M Lee X	7	9
(South Korea) Ji Y-b (South Korea) Lee E-j	21	21
(Thailand) S Piyawatcharavijit (Thailand) P Ungka	21	14	10
(Chinese Taipei) Chiang Y-h (Chinese Taipei) Sun W-p	16	21	21

Second round
1	(Indonesia) N V Marwah (Indonesia) P Syaikah	16	21	17
(China) Chen YX (China) Zhang C	21	14	21
(South Korea) Ji Y-b (South Korea) Lee E-j	20	21	21
(Chinese Taipei) Chiang Y-h (Chinese Taipei) Sun W-p	22	17	8

Quarterfinals
(China) Chen YX (China) Zhang C	21	21
(South Korea) Ji Y-b (South Korea) Lee E-j	19	17

==== Section 2 ====
First round
4	(China) Lin FL (China) Zhou XR	21	21
(Thailand) P Choeikeewong (Thailand) P Suwatnodom	8	16
(Chinese Taipei) Hsien H-y (Chinese Taipei) Wang X-y	10	17
(Indonesia) M Mamahit (Indonesia) T Nadia	21	21
(India) S Singhi (India) R Thaker	22	15	7
(South Korea) Kim G-l (South Korea) Kim S-j	20	21	21
(Vietnam) Nguyen T N L (Vietnam) Than V A	21	19	11
(Hong Kong) Lui L L (Hong Kong) Tsang H Y	17	21	21

Second round
4	(China) Lin FL (China) Zhou XR	21	21
(Indonesia) M Mamahit (Indonesia) T Nadia	11	16
(South Korea) Kim G-l (South Korea) Kim S-j	21	21
(Hong Kong) Lui L L (Hong Kong) Tsang H Y	19	17

Quarterfinals
4	(China) Lin FL (China) Zhou XR	21	21
(South Korea) Kim G-l (South Korea) Kim S-j	14	12

=== Bottom half ===
==== Section 3 ====
First round
(Nepal) J Gurung (Nepal) S Rajbanshi	3	4
(China) Yang JY (China) Zhang JE	21	21
(Malaysia) Go P K (Malaysia) Teoh L X	21	21
(Hong Kong) S S Mehta (Hong Kong) Ng T Y	13	19
(China) Guo LZ (China) Keng SL	21	21
(India) T Jolly (India) V V Sri	14	13
(Sri Lanka) J Amanda (Sri Lanka) Y Kuruppu	6	9
3	(Indonesia) F D Kusuma (Indonesia) A C Pratiwi	21	21

Second round
(China) Yang JY (China) Zhang JE	21	21
(Malaysia) Go P K (Malaysia) Teoh L X	16	16
(China) Guo LZ (China) Keng SL	21	22
3	(Indonesia) F D Kusuma (Indonesia) A C Pratiwi	18	20

Quarterfinals
(China) Yang JY (China) Zhang JE	11	21	18
(China) Guo LZ (China) Keng SL	21	17	21

==== Section 4 ====
First round
(Singapore) Chiu J Y (Singapore) Ong X Q	21	8	12
(Malaysia) Gan J E (Malaysia) Tan Z Y	11	21	21
(India) A Bhatt (India) T Crasto	21	21
(Chinese Taipei) Jiang P-y (Chinese Taipei) Ting Y-y	12	18
(South Korea) Chung D-j (South Korea) Kim A-y	22	17
(Thailand) B Aimsaard (Thailand) P Khantaruangsakul	24	21
(Hong Kong) Leung S L (Hong Kong) Yeung P L	22	11
2	(China) Li YJ (China) Luo XM	24	21

Second round
(Malaysia) Gan J E (Malaysia) Tan Z Y	15	12
(India) A Bhatt (India) T Crasto	21	21
(Thailand) B Aimsaard (Thailand) P Khantaruangsakul	13	14
2	(China) Li YJ (China) Luo XM	21	21

Quarterfinals
(India) A Bhatt (India) T Crasto	7	16
2	(China) Li YJ (China) Luo XM	21	21
