= Li Yijing =

Chinese badminton player (born 2002)

Li Yijing 李怡婧
Personal information
- Born: 12 January 2002 (age 24) Guangdong, China
- Height: 1.65 m (5 ft 5 in)

Sport
- Country: China
- Sport: Badminton
- Handedness: Right

Women's doubles
- Highest ranking: 5 (with Luo Xumin, 27 May 2025)
- Current ranking: 21 (with Luo Xumin, 27 October 2026)
- BWF profile
Medal record
Women's badminton
Representing China
World Championships
Bronze medal – third place	2026 New Delhi	Women's doubles
Uber Cup
Silver medal – second place	2026 Horsens	Women's team
Asian Championships
Gold medal – first place	2026 Ningbo	Women's doubles
Asia Mixed Team Championships
Gold medal – first place	2023 Dubai	Mixed team
World Junior Championships
Gold medal – first place	2018 Markham	Mixed team
Silver medal – second place	2019 Kazan	Mixed team
Bronze medal – third place	2019 Kazan	Girls' doubles
Bronze medal – third place	2019 Kazan	Mixed doubles
Asian Junior Championships
Gold medal – first place	2018 Jakarta	Mixed team
Gold medal – first place	2019 Suzhou	Girls' doubles
Bronze medal – third place	2019 Suzhou	Mixed doubles
Bronze medal – third place	2019 Suzhou	Mixed team

Li Yijing (Chinese: 李怡婧; pinyin: Lǐ Yíjìng; born 12 January 2002) is a Chinese badminton player. She is affiliated with the Guangzhou team. She was part of China's team that won the 2023 Asia Mixed Team Championships.

== Career ==
Li entered the Guangzhou team in August 2016 and started training with the national team in late 2017.

=== 2022 ===
After more than two years not competing internationally, Li and her partner Luo Xumin won their first senior international title at the Vietnam International Series in November. In the following week, they finished as the runners-up at the Malaysia International to their compatriots, Liu Shengshu and Tan Ning.

=== 2024 ===
After successfully breaking into the top 25 in the world rankings in 2023, Li and Luo advanced to the Thailand Masters final in February. They lost to the home pair, Benyapa Aimsaard and Nuntakarn Aimsaard, in three tight games. A few weeks later, the pair won their first BWF World Tour title at the German Open.

In September, they reached the final of the China Open. They emerged as champions, beating teammates Li Wenmei and Zhang Shuxian.

At the Korea Masters in November, Li and Luo finished as runners-up after falling to Kim Hye-jeong and Kong Hee-yong in the final. Two weeks later, the duo reached their fifth final of the season at the China Masters, where they finished second to Liu and Tan.

== Personal life ==
She is a student at South China University of Technology.

== Achievements ==
=== World Championships ===
Women's doubles
Year	Venue	Partner	Opponent	Score	Result
2026	Indira Gandhi Arena, New Delhi, India	(China) Luo Xumin	(South Korea) Baek Ha-na (South Korea) Lee So-hee	17–21, 12–21	Bronze

=== Asian Championships ===
Women's doubles
Year	Venue	Partner	Opponent	Score	Result	Ref.
2026	Ningbo Olympic Sports Center Gymnasium, Ningbo, China	(China) Luo Xumin	(China) Liu Shengshu (China) Tan Ning	8–5 retired	Gold	

=== World Junior Championships ===
Girls' doubles
Year	Venue	Partner	Opponent	Score	Result	Ref.
2019	Kazan Gymnastics Center, Kazan, Russia	(China) Luo Xumin	(Indonesia) Febriana Dwipuji Kusuma (Indonesia) Amallia Cahaya Pratiwi	17–21, 21–23	Bronze	

Mixed doubles
Year	Venue	Partner	Opponent	Score	Result	Ref.
2019	Kazan Gymnastics Center, Kazan, Russia	(China) Jiang Zhenbang	(Indonesia) Leo Rolly Carnando (Indonesia) Indah Cahya Sari Jamil	21–23, 21–12, 19–21	Bronze	

=== Asian Junior Championships ===
Girls' doubles
Year	Venue	Partner	Opponent	Score	Result	Ref.
2019	Suzhou Olympic Sports Centre, Suzhou, China	(China) Luo Xumin	(China) Chen Yingxue (China) Zhang Chi	21–17, 21–17	Gold	

Mixed doubles
Year	Venue	Partner	Opponent	Score	Result	Ref.
2019	Suzhou Olympic Sports Centre, Suzhou, China	(China) Jiang Zhenbang	(Indonesia) Leo Rolly Carnando (Indonesia) Indah Cahya Sari Jamil	17–21, 16–21	Bronze	

=== BWF World Tour (3 titles, 6 runners-up) ===
The BWF World Tour, which was announced on 19 March 2017 and implemented in 2018, is a series of elite badminton tournaments sanctioned by the Badminton World Federation (BWF). The BWF World Tours are divided into levels of World Tour Finals, Super 1000, Super 750, Super 500, Super 300, and the BWF Tour Super 100.

Women's doubles
Year	Tournament	Level	Partner	Opponent	Score	Result
2024	Thailand Masters	Super 300	(China) Luo Xumin	(Thailand) Benyapa Aimsaard (Thailand) Nuntakarn Aimsaard	13–21, 21–17, 25–27	(silver) Runner-up
2024	German Open	Super 300	(China) Luo Xumin	(Bulgaria) Gabriela Stoeva (Bulgaria) Stefani Stoeva	21–7, 13–21, 21–18	(gold) Winner
2024	China Open	Super 1000	(China) Luo Xumin	(China) Li Wenmei (China) Zhang Shuxian	11–21, 21–18, 21–8	(gold) Winner
2024	Korea Masters	Super 300	(China) Luo Xumin	(South Korea) Kim Hye-jeong (South Korea) Kong Hee-yong	14–21, 21–16, 18–21	(silver) Runner-up
2024	China Masters	Super 750	(China) Luo Xumin	(China) Liu Shengshu (China) Tan Ning	10–21, 10–21	(silver) Runner-up
2025	French Open	Super 750	(China) Luo Xumin	(Japan) Yuki Fukushima (Japan) Mayu Matsumoto	21–17, 18–21, 15–21	(silver) Runner-up
2026	Thailand Masters	Super 300	(China) Bao Lijing	(Indonesia) Amallia Cahaya Pratiwi (Indonesia) Siti Fadia Silva Ramadhanti	21–15, 15–21, 18–21	(silver) Runner-up
2026	German Open	Super 300	(China) Wang Yiduo	(China) Bao Lijing (China) Luo Xumin	16–21, 16–21	(silver) Runner-up
2026	Swiss Open	Super 300	(China) Wang Yiduo	(China) Jia Yifan (China) Zhang Shuxian	21–10, 22–20	(gold) Winner

=== BWF International Challenge/Series (1 title, 1 runner-up) ===
Women's doubles
Year	Tournament	Partner	Opponent	Score	Result
2022	Vietnam International Series	(China) Luo Xumin	(Vietnam) Nguyễn Thị Ngọc Lan (Vietnam) Thân Vân Anh	21–12, 21–11	(gold) Winner
2022	Malaysia International	(China) Luo Xumin	(China) Liu Shengshu (China) Tan Ning	22–24, 16–21	(silver) Runner-up

BWF International Challenge tournament
BWF International Series tournament
BWF Future Series tournament

=== BWF Junior International (7 titles, 3 runners-up) ===
Girls' doubles
Year	Tournament	Partner	Opponent	Score	Result	Ref.
2019	Polish Junior	(China) Keng Shuliang	(China) Qian Gouhong (China) Zhou Xinru	16–21, 21–12, 21–11	(gold) Winner	
2019	Swedish Junior	(China) Keng Shuliang	(China) Qian Gouhong (China) Zhou Xinru	12–21, 13–21	(silver) Runner-up	
2019	Italian Junior	(China) Guo Lizhi	(China) Chen Yingxue (China) Lin Fangling	21–11, 21–15	(gold) Winner	
2019	German Junior	(China) Guo Lizhi	(Indonesia) Nita Violina Marwah (Indonesia) Putri Syaikah	16–21, 21–19, 22–20	(gold) Winner	
2019	Banthongyord Junior International	(China) Luo Xumin	(South Korea) Kim A-young (South Korea) Lee Eun-ji	21–18, 21–16	(gold) Winner	

Mixed doubles
Year	Tournament	Partner	Opponent	Score	Result	Ref.
2018	Jaya Raya Junior International	(China) Shang Yichen	(China) Wang Chang (China) Xia Yuting	21–19, 21–19	(gold) Winner	
2019	Polish Junior	(China) Feng Yanzhe	(China) Zheng Xunjin (China) Qian Gouhong	21–9, 21–6	(gold) Winner	
2019	Swedish Junior	(China) Feng Yanzhe	(China) Guan Zicong (China) Keng Shuliang	23–21, 21–8	(gold) Winner	
2019	Italian Junior	(China) Di Zijian	(China) Feng Yanzhe (China) Lin Fangling	13–21, 12–21	(silver) Runner-up	
2019	Banthongyord Junior International	(China) Di Zijian	(Thailand) Kunlavut Vitidsarn (Thailand) Phittayaporn Chaiwan	11–21, 17–21	(silver) Runner-up	

BWF Junior International Grand Prix tournament
BWF Junior International Challenge tournament
BWF Junior International Series tournament
BWF Junior Future Series tournament
