= Luo Xumin =

Chinese badminton player (born 2002)

Luo Xumin 罗徐敏
Personal information
- Born: 5 August 2002 (age 24) Guangdong, China
- Height: 1.68 m (5 ft 6 in)

Sport
- Country: China
- Sport: Badminton
- Handedness: Left

Women's doubles
- Highest ranking: 5 (with Li Yijing, 27 May 2025)
- Current ranking: 21 (with Li Yijing, 27 October 2026)
- BWF profile
Medal record
Women's badminton
Representing China
World Championships
Bronze medal – third place	2026 New Delhi	Women's doubles
Uber Cup
Silver medal – second place	2026 Horsens	Women's team
Asian Championships
Gold medal – first place	2026 Ningbo	Women's doubles
Asia Mixed Team Championships
Gold medal – first place	2023 Dubai	Mixed team
World Junior Championships
Silver medal – second place	2019 Kazan	Mixed team
Bronze medal – third place	2019 Kazan	Girls' doubles
Asian Junior Championships
Gold medal – first place	2019 Suzhou	Girls' doubles
Bronze medal – third place	2019 Suzhou	Mixed team

Luo Xumin (simplified Chinese: 罗徐敏; traditional Chinese: 羅徐敏; pinyin: Luó Xúmǐn; born 5 August 2002) is a Chinese badminton player affiliated with the Guangzhou team. She won the gold medal at the 2026 Asian Championships, and the bronze medal at the 2026 World Championships. Luo was part of China's team that won the 2023 Asia Mixed Team Championships.

== Career ==
=== 2022 ===
After more than two years not competing internationally, Luo and her partner Li Yijing won their first senior international title at the Vietnam International Series in November. In the following week, they finished as the runners-up at the Malaysia International to their compatriots, Liu Shengshu and Tan Ning.

=== 2024 ===
After successfully breaking into the top 25 in the world rankings in 2023, Luo and Li advanced to the Thailand Masters final in February. They lost to the home pair, Benyapa Aimsaard and Nuntakarn Aimsaard, in three tight games. A few weeks later, the pair won their first BWF World Tour title at the German Open. In September, they reached the final of the China Open. They emerged as champions, beating teammates Li Wenmei and Zhang Shuxian.

At the Korea Masters in November, Luo and Li finished as runners-up after falling to Kim Hye-jeong and Kong Hee-yong in the final. Two weeks later, the duo reached their fifth final of the season at the China Masters, where they finished second to Liu and Tan.

=== 2025 – 2026 ===
Throughout 2025, Li and Luo had firmly established themselves as one of China's top young pairs, peaking at World No. 5. They also finished runner-up in the French Open. However, by the end of 2025 and into the 2026 India Open, their performance encountered a bottleneck. They found themselves consistently blocked by their top-tier compatriots, Liu Shengshu and Tan Ning. The brief experimental separation of Li and Luo in early 2026. At the German Open, they both reached the final with different partners, with Luo and his new partner Bao Lijing emerging victorious. Li and Luo were reunited at the Asian Championships, where they won the gold medal after their opponents Liu Shengshu and Tan Ning retired early in the first game. Luo then partnered with Chen Fanshutian at the Malaysia Masters, and went on to win the competition. In August, Luo paired up again with Li at the BWF World Championships. They played well and won the bronze medal, losing to Baek Ha-na and Lee So-hee of Korea in straight games. Two months later at the 2026 Arctic Open, Luo paired up once again with Chen and won their second title together against the Taiwanese pair of Hsu Yin-hui and Lin Jhih-yun.

== Personal life ==
She is a student at South China University of Technology.

== Achievements ==
=== World Championships ===
Women's doubles
Year	Venue	Partner	Opponent	Score	Result	Ref.
2026	Indira Gandhi Arena; New Delhi, India	(China) Li Yijing	(South Korea) Baek Ha-na (South Korea) Lee So-hee	17–21, 12–21	Bronze	

=== Asian Championships ===
Women's doubles
Year	Venue	Partner	Opponent	Score	Result	Ref.
2026	Ningbo Olympic Sports Center Gymnasium; Ningbo, China	(China) Li Yijing	(China) Liu Shengshu (China) Tan Ning	8–5 retired	Gold	

=== World Junior Championships ===
Girls' doubles
Year	Venue	Partner	Opponent	Score	Result	Ref.
2019	Kazan Gymnastics Center; Kazan, Russia	(China) Li Yijing	(Indonesia) Febriana Dwipuji Kusuma (Indonesia) Amallia Cahaya Pratiwi	17–21, 21–23	Bronze	

=== Asian Junior Championships ===
Girls' doubles
Year	Venue	Partner	Opponent	Score	Result	Ref.
2019	Suzhou Olympic Sports Centre; Suzhou, China	(China) Li Yijing	(China) Chen Yingxue (China) Zhang Chi	21–17, 21–17	Gold	

=== BWF World Tour (5 titles, 4 runners-up) ===
The BWF World Tour, which was announced on 19 March 2017 and implemented in 2018, is a series of elite badminton tournaments sanctioned by the Badminton World Federation (BWF). The BWF World Tours are divided into levels of World Tour Finals, Super 1000, Super 750, Super 500, Super 300, and the BWF Tour Super 100.

Women's doubles
Year	Tournament	Level	Partner	Opponent	Score	Result	Ref.
2024	Thailand Masters	Super 300	(China) Li Yijing	(Thailand) Benyapa Aimsaard (Thailand) Nuntakarn Aimsaard	13–21, 21–17, 25–27	(silver) Runner-up	
2024	German Open	Super 300	(China) Li Yijing	(Bulgaria) Gabriela Stoeva (Bulgaria) Stefani Stoeva	21–7, 13–21, 21–18	(gold) Winner	
2024	China Open	Super 1000	(China) Li Yijing	(China) Li Wenmei (China) Zhang Shuxian	11–21, 21–18, 21–8	(gold) Winner	
2024	Korea Masters	Super 300	(China) Li Yijing	(South Korea) Kim Hye-jeong (South Korea) Kong Hee-yong	14–21, 21–16, 18–21	(silver) Runner-up	
2024	China Masters	Super 750	(China) Li Yijing	(China) Liu Shengshu (China) Tan Ning	10–21, 10–21	(silver) Runner-up	
2025	French Open	Super 750	(China) Li Yijing	(Japan) Yuki Fukushima (Japan) Mayu Matsumoto	21–17, 18–21, 15–21	(silver) Runner-up	
2026	German Open	Super 300	(China) Bao Lijing	(China) Li Yijing (China) Wang Yiduo	21–16, 21–16	(gold) Winner	
2026	Malaysia Masters	Super 500	(China) Chen Fanshutian	(Japan) Sayaka Hirota (Japan) Ayako Sakuramoto	21–16, 25–23	(gold) Winner	
2026	Arctic Open	Super 500	(China) Chen Fanshutian	(Chinese Taipei) Hsu Yin-hui (Chinese Taipei) Lin Jhih-yun	21–18, 21–19	(gold) Winner	

=== BWF International Challenge/Series (1 title, 1 runner-up) ===
Women's doubles
Year	Tournament	Partner	Opponent	Score	Result	Ref.
2022	Vietnam International Series	(China) Li Yijing	(Vietnam) Nguyễn Thị Ngọc Lan (Vietnam) Thân Vân Anh	21–12, 21–11	(gold) Winner	
2022	Malaysia International	(China) Li Yijing	(China) Liu Shengshu (China) Tan Ning	22–24, 16–21	(silver) Runner-up	

BWF International Challenge tournament
BWF International Series tournament
BWF Future Series tournament

=== BWF Junior International (2 titles, 1 runner-up) ===
Girls' doubles
Year	Tournament	Partner	Opponent	Score	Result	Ref.
2019	Dutch Junior International	(China) Zhou Xinru	(Indonesia) Nita Violina Marwah (Indonesia) Putri Syaikah	19–21, 18–21	(silver) Runner-up	
2019	Banthongyord Junior International	(China) Li Yijing	(South Korea) Kim A-young (South Korea) Lee Eun-ji	21–18, 21–16	(gold) Winner	

Mixed doubles
Year	Tournament	Partner	Opponent	Score	Result	Ref.
2019	German Junior	(China) Jiang Zhenbang	(South Korea) Kim Joon-young (South Korea) Lee Eun-ji	21–15, 21–16	(gold) Winner	

BWF Junior International Grand Prix tournament
BWF Junior International Challenge tournament
BWF Junior International Series tournament
BWF Junior Future Series tournament
