= 2025 BWF World Championships qualification =

Badminton qualification

This is the list of entries for the 2025 BWF World Championships qualification.

== Overview ==
=== Events ===
==== Number of players/member association quota ====
This event's total limit of eligibility players is 416 players, the following charts are the rules and the distribution. This is the first time that women's singles event quota is up to 64, same as men's singles.

	Men's singles	Women's singles	Men's doubles	Women's doubles	Mixed doubles	Total
Entry limits	64 players	64 players	96 players (48 pairs)	96 players (48 pairs)	96 players (48 pairs)	416 players

Players/pairs ranked on date eligible	Total number of players/pairs from any one Member Association in that event must not exceed
1 to 8	4
9 to 24	3
25 to 150	2

== Participating players ==
=== Men's singles ===
According to the phase 2 updated by BWF, the following table is the invitation results.

Players who ranked from 1 to 8, whose association could nominate 4 players.
Players who ranked from 9 to 24, whose association could nominate 3 players.
Players who ranked from 25 to 150, whose association could nominate 2 players.

Rank	Nation / Player	Points	Eligibility			Note
Qualifiers
1	(China) Shi Yuqi	99,435	1	China	1	Highest ranked Asian
2	(Thailand) Kunlavut Vitidsarn	89,138	2	Thailand	1	
3	(Denmark) Anders Antonsen	87,693	3	Denmark	1	Highest ranked European
5	(China) Li Shifeng	81,656	4	China	2	
6	(Indonesia) Jonatan Christie	81,327	5	Indonesia	1	
7	(Chinese Taipei) Chou Tien-chen	76,157	6	Chinese Taipei	1	
8	(Japan) Kodai Naraoka	75,387	7	Japan	1	
9	(Malaysia) Lee Zii Jia	70,671	8	Malaysia	1	
10	(France) Alex Lanier	70,671	9	France	1	Host nation's presenter
11	(Singapore) Loh Kean Yew	62,299	10	Singapore	1	
12	(China) Weng Hongyang	61,767	11	China	3	
13	(Japan) Kenta Nishimoto	61,603	12	Japan	2	
14	(China) Lu Guangzu	60,905	59	China	4	
15	(Chinese Taipei) Lee Chia-hao	59,408	13	Chinese Taipei	2	
16	(Japan) Koki Watanabe	58,324	14	Japan	3	
17	(Chinese Taipei) Lin Chun-yi	57,660	15	Chinese Taipei	3	
18	(India) Lakshya Sen	57,168	16	India	1	
19	(Hong Kong) Ng Ka Long	56,556	17	Hong Kong	1	
20	(France) Toma Junior Popov	56,291	18	France	2	
21	(Hong Kong) Lee Cheuk Yiu	53,010	19	Hong Kong	2	
22	(Japan) Yushi Tanaka	50,612	60	Japan	4	
23	(Singapore) Jason Teh	50,545	20	Singapore	2	
24	(Chinese Taipei) Wang Tzu-wei	49,173	61	Chinese Taipei	4	
25	(France) Christo Popov	48,597	62	France	3	
26	(Malaysia) Leong Jun Hao	48,276	21	Malaysia	2	
28	(Indonesia) Anthony Sinisuka Ginting	45,775	22	Indonesia	2	
30	(India) Prannoy H. S.	42,952	23	India	2	
31	(Denmark) Rasmus Gemke	41,704	63	Denmark	3	
32	(Canada) Brian Yang	41,352	24	Canada	1	Highest ranked Pan American
33	(Indonesia) Alwi Farhan	40,034	64	Indonesia	3	
37	(Republic of Ireland) Nhat Nguyen	39,090	25	Ireland	1	
41	(Thailand) Kantaphon Wangcharoen	36,200	26	Thailand	2	
42	(South Korea) Jeon Hyeok-jin	35,193	27	South Korea	1	
51	(Belgium) Julien Carraggi	28,517	28	Belgium	1	
52	(Finland) Joakim Oldorff	28,357	29	Finland	1	
55	(Finland) Kalle Koljonen	27,465	30	Finland	2	
64	(Vietnam) Lê Đức Phát	24,410	31	Vietnam	1	
65	(Israel) Misha Zilberman	24,294	32	Israel	1	
67	(Sri Lanka) Viren Nettasinghe	23,790	33	Sri Lanka	1	
72	(Italy) Giovanni Toti	21,701	34	Italy	1	
74	(Germany) Matthias Kicklitz	21,689	35	Germany	1	
76	(Vietnam) Nguyễn Hải Đăng	21,430	36	Vietnam	2	
80	(Canada) Victor Lai	21,296	37	Canada	1	
83	(Croatia) Aria Dinata	20,356	38	Croatia	1	
90	(Azerbaijan) Ade Resky Dwicahyo	18,987	39	Azerbaijan	1	
91	(Peru) Adriano Viale	18,878	40	Peru	1	
93	(Spain) Pablo Abián	18,691	41	Spain	1	
94	(Sweden) Gustav Bjorkler	18,648	42	Sweden	1	
95	(England) Harry Huang	18,646	43	England	1	
103	(Czech Republic) Jan Louda	17,051	44	Czech Republic	1	
104	(El Salvador) Uriel Canjura	17,041	45	El Salvador	1	
107	(Azerbaijan) Dicky Dwi Pangestu	16,810	46	Azerbaijan	2	
108	(Germany) Fabian Roth	16,789	47	Germany	2	
109	(England) Ethan Rose	16,760	48	England	2	
114	(Australia) Jack Yu	15,515	49	Australia	1	Highest ranked Oceanian
121	(Brazil) Ygor Coelho	14,930	50	Brazil	1	
122	(Switzerland) Tobias Künzi	14,670	51	Switzerland	1	
123	(Brazil) Jonathan Matias	14,321	52	Brazil	2	
127	(South Korea) Kim Byung-jae	14,240	53	South Korea	2	
129	(New Zealand) Edward Lau	14,020	54	New Zealand	1	
130	(Macau) Pui Pang Fong	13,993	55	Macau	1	
139	(Mauritius) Julien Paul	12,753	56	Mauritius	1	Highest ranked African
147	(Austria) Collins Valentine Filimon	12,153	57	Austria	1	
149	(Sri Lanka) Dumindu Abeywickrama	12,050	58	Sri Lanka	2	
Reserve
27	(China) Lei Lanxi	46,060	5	China	5	
29	(Chinese Taipei) Chi Yu-jen	45,290	6	Chinese Taipei	5	
34	(China) Wang Zhengxing	39,730	9	China	6	
35	(India) Kiran George	39,675	10	India	3	
36	(India) Priyanshu Rajawat	39,230	11	India	4	
38	(Hong Kong) Jason Gunawan	38,410	12	Hong Kong	3	
39	(Indonesia) Chico Aura Dwi Wardoyo	37,415	13	Indonesia	4	
40	(Chinese Taipei) Su Li-yang	36,790	14	Chinese Taipei	6	
43	(Japan) Takuma Obayashi	34,750	15	Japan	5	
44	(India) Ayush Shetty	34,150	16	India	5	
45	(Japan) Koo Takahashi	33,400	17	Japan	6	
46	(Malaysia) Justin Hoh	33,383	18	Malaysia	3	
47	(Japan) Riku Hatano	32,220	19	Japan	7	
48	(India) Sathish Karunakaran	31,857	20	India	6	
49	(Thailand) Panitchaphon Teeraratsakul	29,628	21	Thailand	3	
50	(Malaysia) Aidil Sholeh	29,500	22	Malaysia	4	
53	(India) Meiraba Maisnam	27,940	23	India	7	
54	(Malaysia) Cheam June Wei	27,587	24	Malaysia	5	
56	(India) Sankar Subramanian	27,300	25	India	8	
Decline
4	(Denmark) Viktor Axelsen	87,610	No	Denmark		
71	(Israel) Daniil Dubovenko	22,260	No	Israel		
86	(Kazakhstan) Dmitriy Panarin	19,456	No	Kazakhstan		
98	(United Arab Emirates) Vishal Vasudevan	17,690	No	United Arab Emirates		Not eligible
101	(Guatemala) Kevin Cordón	17,258	No	Guatemala		
105	(Netherlands) Joran Kweekel	16,847	No	Netherlands		Withdrawn
136	(Australia) Karono	13,160	No	Australia		Not eligible

=== Women's singles ===
According to the phase 2 updated by BWF, the following table is the invitation results.

Players who ranked from 1 to 8, whose association could nominate 4 players.
Players who ranked from 9 to 24, whose association could nominate 3 players.
Players who ranked from 25 to 150, whose association could nominate 2 players.

Rank	Nation / Player	Points	Eligibility			Note		
Qualifiers
1	(South Korea) An Se-young	112,867	1	South Korea	1	Highest ranked Asian		
2	(China) Wang Zhiyi	98,315	2	China	1			
3	(China) Han Yue	83,909	3	China	2			
4	(Japan) Akane Yamaguchi	79,967	4	Japan	1			
5	(Indonesia) Gregoria Mariska Tunjung	79,082	5	Indonesia	1			
6	(Thailand) Pornpawee Chochuwong	70,778	6	Thailand	1			
7	(China) Chen Yufei	69,882	7	China	3			
8	(Japan) Tomoka Miyazaki	68,271	8	Japan	2			
9	(Thailand) Supanida Katethong	67,264	9	Thailand	2			
10	(Thailand) Busanan Ongbamrungphan	62,460	10	Thailand	3			
11	(Indonesia) Putri Kusuma Wardani	61,627	11	Indonesia	2			
12	(Singapore) Yeo Jia Min	61,583	12	Singapore	1			
13	(Thailand) Ratchanok Intanon	61,413	60	Thailand	4			
14	(China) Gao Fangjie	61,050	61	China	4			
15	(South Korea) Sim Yu-jin	57,780	13	South Korea	2			
16	(Denmark) Line Kjærsfeldt	54,446	14	Denmark	1	Highest ranked European		
17	(United States) Beiwen Zhang	54,176	15	United States	1	Highest ranked Pan American		
18	(India) P. V. Sindhu	52,940	16	India	1			
19	(Japan) Natsuki Nidaira	50,550	17	Japan	3			
20	(Chinese Taipei) Sung Shuo-yun	49,812	18	Chinese Taipei	1			
21	(Canada) Michelle Li	48,499	19	Canada	1			
23	(Chinese Taipei) Hsu Wen-chi	46,681	20	Chinese Taipei	2			
24	(Chinese Taipei) Chiu Pin-chian	44,970	21	Chinese Taipei	3			
25	(South Korea) Kim Ga-eun	44,890	62	South Korea	3			
26	(Denmark) Mia Blichfeldt	44,700	22	Denmark	2			
27	(Vietnam) Nguyễn Thùy Linh	44,560	23	Vietnam	1			
28	(Scotland) Kirsty Gilmour	43,550	24	Scotland	1			
29	(Denmark) Julie Dawall Jakobsen	42,592	63	Denmark	3			
31	(Chinese Taipei) Lin Hsiang-ti	41,200	64	Chinese Taipei	4			
43	(Malaysia) Goh Jin Wei	33,648	25	Malaysia	1			
45	(Ukraine) Polina Buhrova	32,827	26	Ukraine	1			
50	(Hong Kong) Lo Sin Yan	30,335	27	Hong Kong	1			
52	(Malaysia) Letshanaa Karupathevan	29,895	28	Malaysia	2			
55	(Canada) Wenyu Zhang	28,635	29	Canada	2			
56	(Brazil) Juliana Vieira	28,483	30	Brazil	1			
63	(Azerbaijan) Keisha Fatimah Azzahra	27,177	31	Azerbaijan	1			
64	(United States) Ishika Jaiswal	27,170	32	United States	1			
65	(Turkey) Neslihan Arın	26,676	33	Turkey	1			
71	(Germany) Yvonne Li	24,778	34	Germany	1			
72	(Peru) Inés Castillo	24,669	35	Peru	1			
73	(Myanmar) Thet Htar Thuzar	24,650	36	Myanmar	1			
76	(Bulgaria) Kaloyana Nalbantova	24,101	37	Bulgaria	1			
78	(Hong Kong) Saloni Samirbhai Mehta	24,019	38	Hong Kong	2			
83	(Hungary) Vivien Sándorházi	22,770	39	Hungary	1			
87	(Czech Republic) Tereza Švábíková	22,088	40	Czech Republic	1			
88	(France) Anna Tatranova	21,955	41	France	2	Host nation's presenter		
89	(Spain) Clara Azurmendi	21,852	42	Spain	2			
99	(Hungary) Ágnes Körösi	19,660	43	Hungary	2			
100	(Bulgaria) Stefani Stoeva	19,546	44	Bulgaria	2			
101	(Singapore) Jaslyn Hooi	19,417	45	Singapore	2			
106	(Belgium) Clara Lassaux	18,536	46	Belgium	1			
108	(Sri Lanka) Ranithma Liyanage	17,140	47	Sri Lanka	1			
113	(Germany) Miranda Wilson	16,656	48	Germany	2			
114	(Australia) Tiffany Ho	16,653	49	Australia	1	Highest ranked Oceanian		
115	(Ukraine) Yevheniia Kantemyr	16,496	50	Ukraine	2			
119	(Republic of Ireland) Rachael Darragh	15,823	51	Ireland	1			
121	(Czech Republic) Petra Maixnerová	15,648	52	Czech Republic	2			
123	(Switzerland) Milena Schnider	15,396	53	Switzerland	1			
126	(Australia) Bernice Teoh	14,870	54	Australia	2			
131	(Italy) Yasmine Hamza	14,553	55	Italy	1			
132	(Estonia) Kristin Kuuba	14,399	56	Estonia	1			
135	(Vietnam) Vũ Thị Trang	13,950	57	Vietnam	2			
139	(Turkey) Özge Bayrak	13,514	58	Turkey	2			
154	(Uganda) Fadilah Mohamed Rafi	11,961	59	Uganda	1	Highest ranked African	-	Reserve
30	(China) Zhang Yiman	41,550	5	China	5			
32	(Japan) Kaoru Sugiyama	39,960	7	Japan	4			
33	(Japan) Riko Gunji	39,900	8	Japan	5			
34	(Indonesia) Ester Nurumi Tri Wardoyo	39,170	9	Indonesia	3			
35	(Indonesia) Komang Ayu Cahya Dewi	39,065	10	Indonesia	4			
36	(Thailand) Pornpicha Choeikeewong	38,540	11	Thailand	5			
37	(Chinese Taipei) Pai Yu-po	38,438	12	Chinese Taipei	5			
38	(Japan) Nozomi Okuhara	37,991	13	Japan	6			
39	(Denmark) Line Christophersen	37,663	14	Denmark	4			
40	(Japan) Manami Suizu	36,980	15	Japan	7			
42	(India) Rakshitha Ramraj	33,820	16	India	3			
44	(India) Anupama Upadhyaya	32,940	17	India	4			
46	(Japan) Hina Akechi	32,060	18	Japan	8			
47	(Thailand) Lalinrat Chaiwan	31,930	19	Thailand	6			
48	(Chinese Taipei) Tai Tzu-ying	31,821	20	Chinese Taipei	6			
49	(India) Aakarshi Kashyap	31,670	21	India	5			
51	(Chinese Taipei) Liang Ting-yu	30,070	22	Chinese Taipei	7			
53	(Chinese Taipei) Tung Ciou-tong	29,250	23	Chinese Taipei	8			
54	(India) Unnati Hooda	29,070	24	India	6			
57	(China) Han Qianxi	28,380	25	China	6			
Decline
22	(India) Malvika Bansod	46,802	No	India				
41	(United States) Lauren Lam	34,678	No	United States				
70	(Spain) Carolina Marín	24,950	No	Spain				
81	(France) Léonice Huet	23,042	No	France				
110	(Poland) Wiktoria Dąbczyńska	16,954	No	Poland				

=== Men's doubles ===
According to the phase 2 updated by BWF, the following table is the invitation results.

Players who ranked from 1 to 8, whose association could nominate 4 players.
Players who ranked from 9 to 24, whose association could nominate 3 players.
Players who ranked from 25 to 150, whose association could nominate 2 players.

Rank	Nation / Player	Points	Eligibility			Note
Qualifiers
1	(Denmark) Kim Astrup (Denmark) Anders Skaarup Rasmussen	93,103	1	Denmark	1	Highest ranked European
2	(Malaysia) Goh Sze Fei (Malaysia) Nur Izzuddin	88,276	2	Malaysia	1	Highest ranked Asian
3	(China) Liang Weikeng (China) Wang Chang	84,618	3	China	1	
4	(Malaysia) Aaron Chia (Malaysia) Soh Wooi Yik	81,885	4	Malaysia	2	
5	(Indonesia) Fajar Alfian (Indonesia) Muhammad Rian Ardianto	81,007	5	Indonesia	1	
7	(Malaysia) Man Wei Chong (Malaysia) Tee Kai Wun	68,233	6	Malaysia	3	
8	(Indonesia) Sabar Karyaman Gutama (Indonesia) Muhammad Reza Pahlevi Isfahani	67,190	7	Indonesia	2	
9	(Indonesia) Leo Rolly Carnando (Indonesia) Bagas Maulana	64,660	8	Indonesia	3	
11	(India) Satwiksairaj Rankireddy (India) Chirag Shetty	62,430	9	India	1	
12	(China) Chen Boyang (China) Liu Yi	62,360	10	China	2	
13	(England) Ben Lane (England) Sean Vendy	59,988	11	England	1	
15	(Chinese Taipei) Lee Jhe-huei (Chinese Taipei) Yang Po-hsuan	58,650	12	Chinese Taipei	1	
16	(Denmark) Rasmus Kjær (Denmark) Frederik Søgaard	55,292	13	Denmark	2	
17	(Japan) Takuro Hoki (Japan) Yugo Kobayashi	52,919	14	Japan	1	
18	(France) Christo Popov (France) Toma Junior Popov	52,767	15	France	1	Host nation's presenter
19	(Chinese Taipei) Chiu Hsiang-chieh (Chinese Taipei) Wang Chi-lin	50,239	16	Chinese Taipei	2	
20	(South Korea) Kim Won-ho (South Korea) Seo Seung-jae	50,050	17	South Korea	1	
21	(Malaysia) Junaidi Arif (Malaysia) Yap Roy King	49,600	48	Malaysia	4	
22	(Chinese Taipei) Liu Kuang-heng (Chinese Taipei) Yang Po-han	49,500	18	Chinese Taipei	3	
23	(Thailand) Kittinupong Kedren (Thailand) Dechapol Puavaranukroh	48,490	19	Thailand	1	
25	(Japan) Kenya Mitsuhashi (Japan) Hiroki Okamura	43,225	20	Japan	2	
29	(Thailand) Peeratchai Sukphun (Thailand) Pakkapon Teeraratsakul	40,529	21	Thailand	2	
33	(United States) Chen Zhi-yi (United States) Presley Smith	37,893	22	United States	1	Highest ranked Pan American
39	(France) Éloi Adam (France) Léo Rossi	34,516	23	France	2	
42	(India) Hariharan Amsakarunan (India) Ruban Kumar Rethinasabapathi	33,030	24	India	2	
43	(Scotland) Christopher Grimley (Scotland) Matthew Grimley	32,600	25	Scotland	1	
50	(South Korea) Kim Gi-jung (South Korea) Kim Sa-rang	28,760	26	South Korea	2	
57	(England) Rory Easton (England) Alex Green	26,374	27	England	2	
68	(Canada) Kevin Lee (Canada) Ty Alexander Lindeman	22,921	28	Canada	1	
71	(Singapore) Wesley Koh (Singapore) Junsuke Kubo	22,267	29	Singapore	1	
76	(Canada) Jonathan Lai (Canada) Nyl Yakura	20,530	30	Canada	2	
79	(Algeria) Koceila Mammeri (Algeria) Youcef Sabri Medel	19,225	31	Algeria	1	Highest ranked African
83	(Bulgaria) Ivan Rusev (Bulgaria) Iliyan Stoynov	18,430	32	Bulgaria	1	
84	(Brazil) Fabrício Farias (Brazil) Davi Silva	18,401	33	Brazil	1	
85	(Scotland) Alexander Dunn (Scotland) Adam Pringle	18,380	34	Scotland	2	
87	(Hong Kong) Hung Kuei Chun (Hong Kong) Lui Chun Wai	17,902	35	Hong Kong	1	
88	(Azerbaijan) Agil Gabilov (Azerbaijan) Dicky Dwi Pangestu	17,815	36	Azerbaijan	1	
91	(Germany) Malik Bourakkadi (Germany) Kenneth Neumann	17,532	37	Germany	2	
92	(Hong Kong) Law Cheuk Him (Hong Kong) Yeung Shing Choi	17,438	38	Hong Kong	2	
95	(Czech Republic) Jiří Král (Czech Republic) Ondřej Král	17,194	39	Czech Republic	1	
96	(Guatemala) Christopher Martínez (Guatemala) Jonathan Solís	17,169	40	Guatemala	1	
98	(Philippines) Solomon Padiz Jr. (Philippines) Julius Villabrille	16,820	41	Philippines	1	
103	(Australia) Keith Mark Edison (Australia) Jack Yu	16,520	42	Australia	1	Highest ranked Oceanian
109	(Brazil) Izak Batalha (Brazil) Matheus Voigt	15,555	43	Brazil	2	
114	(Switzerland) Yann Orteu (Switzerland) Minh Quang Pham	15,292	44	Switzerland	1	
120	(Spain) Daniel Franco (Spain) Rodrigo Sanjurjo	14,332	45	Spain	1	
121	(Spain) Ruben García (Spain) Carlos Piris	13,976	46	Spain	2	
132	(Vietnam) Nguyễn Đình Hoàng (Vietnam) Trần Đình Mạnh	12,950	47	Vietnam	1	
Reserve
24	(Chinese Taipei) Lee Fang-chih (Chinese Taipei) Lee Fang-jen	48,260	3	Chinese Taipei	4	
26	(Denmark) Daniel Lundgaard (Denmark) Mads Vestergaard	43,020	4	Denmark	3	
27	(Malaysia) Nur Mohd Azriyn Ayub (Malaysia) Tan Wee Kiong	42,540	5	Malaysia	5	
28	(China) Xie Haonan (China) Zeng Weihan	41,810	6	China	3	
31	(Malaysia) Choong Hon Jian (Malaysia) Muhammad Haikal	38,411	8	Malaysia	6	
32	(Malaysia) Ong Yew Sin (Malaysia) Teo Ee Yi	38,060	9	Malaysia	7	
35	(Indonesia) Mohammad Ahsan (Indonesia) Hendra Setiawan	37,340	11	Indonesia	5	
36	(Chinese Taipei) Lu Ming-che (Chinese Taipei) Tang Kai-wei	35,760	12	Chinese Taipei	5	
37	(Chinese Taipei) Lin Bing-wei (Chinese Taipei) Su Ching-heng	34,820	13	Chinese Taipei	6	
38	(Chinese Taipei) Chen Zhi-ray (Chinese Taipei) Lin Yu-chieh	34,640	14	Chinese Taipei	7	
40	(Japan) Takumi Nomura (Japan) Yuichi Shimogami	33,670	15	Japan	3	
41	(Malaysia) Low Hang Yee (Malaysia) Ng Eng Cheong	33,390	16	Malaysia	8	
44	(India) Pruthvi Krishnamurthy Roy (India) K. Sai Pratheek	32,300	17	India	3	
45	(Chinese Taipei) Chang Ko-chi (Chinese Taipei) Chen Xin-yuan	31,370	18	Chinese Taipei	8	
46	(Indonesia) Rahmat Hidayat (Indonesia) Yeremia Rambitan	31,250	19	Indonesia	6	
48	(Chinese Taipei) Chiang Chien-wei (Chinese Taipei) Wu Hsuan-yi	29,860	21	Chinese Taipei	9	
49	(China) Sun Wenjun (China) Zhu Yijun	28,980	22	China	4	
51	(Malaysia) Lau Yi Sheng (Malaysia) Lee Yi Bo	28,740	23	Malaysia	9	
52	(Denmark) William Kryger Boe (Denmark) Christian Faust Kjær	27,930	24	Denmark	4	
53	(China) Cui Hechen (China) Peng Jianqin	27,720	25	China	5	
Decline
6	(China) He Jiting (China) Ren Xiangyu	79,321	No	China		
10	(Indonesia) Muhammad Shohibul Fikri (Indonesia) Daniel Marthin	62,537	No	Indonesia		Reserved 1
14	(South Korea) Kang Min-hyuk (South Korea) Seo Seung-jae	59,715	No	South Korea		
30	(China) Huang Di (China) Liu Yang	59,715	No	China		Reserved 7, Withdrawn
34	(Denmark) Andreas Søndergaard (Denmark) Jesper Toft	37,460	No	Denmark		Reserved 10
47	(Thailand) Chaloempon Charoenkitamorn (Thailand) Worrapol Thongsa-nga	31,220	No	Thailand		Reserved 20
54	(Germany) Bjarne Geiss (Germany) Jan Colin Völker	27,448	No	Germany		
55	(England) Callum Hemming (England) Ethan van Leeuwen	26,723	No	England		
62	(Germany) Daniel Hess (Germany) Marvin Seidel	25,148	No	Germany		
80	(Netherlands) Ties van der Lecq (Netherlands) Brian Wassink	19,043	No	Netherlands		
102	(Sweden) Filip Karlborg (Sweden) Mio Molin	16,526	No	Sweden		
107	(Philippines) Christian Bernardo (Philippines) Alvin Morada	15,920	No	Philippines		
126	(New Zealand) Adam Jeffrey (New Zealand) Dylan Soedjasa	13,562	No	New Zealand		

=== Women's doubles ===
According to the phase 2 updated by BWF, the following table is the invitation results.

Players who ranked from 1 to 8, whose association could nominate 4 players.
Players who ranked from 9 to 24, whose association could nominate 3 players.
Players who ranked from 25 to 150, whose association could nominate 2 players.

Rank	Nation / Player	Points	Eligibility			Note
Qualifiers
1	(China) Liu Shengshu (China) Tan Ning	101,946	1	China	1	Highest ranked Asian
2	(Japan) Nami Matsuyama (Japan) Chiharu Shida	92,295	2	Japan	1	
3	(South Korea) Baek Ha-na (South Korea) Lee So-hee	88,956	3	South Korea	1	
4	(Japan) Rin Iwanaga (Japan) Kie Nakanishi	79,380	4	Japan	2	
5	(Malaysia) Pearly Tan (Malaysia) Thinaah Muralitharan	78,220	5	Malaysia	1	
6	(China) Li Yijing (China) Luo Xumin	77,640	6	China	2	
8	(Indonesia) Febriana Dwipuji Kusuma (Indonesia) Amallia Cahaya Pratiwi	65,430	7	Indonesia	1	
9	(South Korea) Kim Hye-jeong (South Korea) Kong Hee-yong	63,962	8	South Korea	2	
11	(Japan) Yuki Fukushima (Japan) Mayu Matsumoto	58,490	9	Japan	3	
12	(Bulgaria) Gabriela Stoeva (Bulgaria) Stefani Stoeva	54,960	10	Bulgaria	1	Highest ranked European
13	(Hong Kong) Yeung Nga Ting (Hong Kong) Yeung Pui Lam	52,643	11	Hong Kong	1	
14	(China) Jia Yifan (China) Zhang Shuxian	53,230	12	China	3	
15	(Chinese Taipei) Hsieh Pei-shan (Chinese Taipei) Hung En-tzu	51,480	13	Chinese Taipei	1	
16	(Chinese Taipei) Sung Shuo-yun (Chinese Taipei) Yu Chien-hui	50,984	14	Chinese Taipei	2	
17	(Thailand) Laksika Kanlaha (Thailand) Phataimas Muenwong	48,767	15	Thailand	1	
18	(Chinese Taipei) Chang Ching-hui (Chinese Taipei) Yang Ching-tun	45,950	16	Chinese Taipei	3	
19	(Ukraine) Polina Buhrova (Ukraine) Yevheniia Kantemyr	45,367	17	Ukraine	1	
20	(Chinese Taipei) Hsu Yin-hui (Chinese Taipei) Lin Jhih-yun	44,610	46	Chinese Taipei	4	
25	(Malaysia) Go Pei Kee (Malaysia) Teoh Mei Xing	38,640	18	Malaysia	2	
26	(Indonesia) Lanny Tria Mayasari (Indonesia) Siti Fadia Silva Ramadhanti	37,116	19	Indonesia	2	
31	(Hong Kong) Lui Lok Lok (Hong Kong) Tsang Hiu Yan	33,144	20	Hong Kong	2	
32	(India) Rutaparna Panda (India) Swetaparna Panda	32,790	21	India	2	
35	(Japan) Mizuki Otake (Japan) Miyu Takahashi	31,830	47	Japan	4	
39	(India) Priya Konjengbam (India) Shruti Mishra	29,496	48	India	3	
42	(Poland) Paulina Hankiewicz (Poland) Kornelia Marczak	29,343	22	Poland	1	
45	(Scotland) Julie MacPherson (Scotland) Ciara Torrance	29,210	23	Scotland	1	
59	(France) Téa Margueritte (France) Flavie Vallet	25,297	24	France	1	Host nation's presenter
61	(Turkey) Bengisu Erçetin (Turkey) Nazlıcan İnci	24,433	25	Turkey	1	
62	(France) Margot Lambert (France) Camille Pognante	24,402	26	France	2	
69	(Switzerland) Lucie Amiguet (Switzerland) Caroline Racloz	21,064	27	Switzerland	1	
70	(England) Sian Kelly (England) Annie Lado	20,937	28	England	1	
72	(Brazil) Jacqueline Lima (Brazil) Sâmia Lima	20,185	29	Brazil	1	Highest ranked Pan American
73	(England) Abbygael Harris (England) Lizzie Tolman	20,067	30	England	2	
74	(Austria) Serena Au Yeong (Austria) Anna Hagspiel	19,777	31	Austria	1	
76	(Spain) Paula López (Spain) Lucía Rodríguez	19,091	32	Spain	1	
81	(United Arab Emirates) Taabia Khan (United Arab Emirates) Mysha Omer Khan	18,280	33	United Arab Emirates	1	
82	(United States) Lauren Lam (United States) Allison Lee	17,975	34	United States	1	
84	(Australia) Gronya Somerville (Australia) Angela Yu	17,488	35	Australia	1	Highest ranked Oceanian
92	(Bulgaria) Mihaela Chepisheva (Bulgaria) Tsvetina Popivanova	16,010	36	Bulgaria	2	
93	(Germany) Selin Hübsch (Germany) Amelie Lehmann	15,630	37	Germany	1	
99	(Philippines) Airah Mae Nicole Albo (Philippines) Eleanor Christine Inlayo	14,820	38	Philippines	1	
100	(Netherlands) Kirsten de Wit (Ukraine) Mariia Stoliarenko	14,490	39	Netherlands; Ukraine	1; 2	
104	(Republic of Ireland) Orla Flynn (Republic of Ireland) Moya Ryan	14,110	40	Ireland	1	
113	(Switzerland) Chloé Brand (Switzerland) Julie Franconville	13,030	41	Switzerland	2	
114	(Sri Lanka) Hasini Ambalangodage (Sri Lanka) Hasara Wijayarathne	12,880	42	Sri Lanka	1	
122	(Spain) Nikol Carulla (Spain) Carmen María Jiménez	11,923	43	Spain	2	
123	(Sri Lanka) Isuri Attanayake (Sri Lanka) Sithumi de Silva	11,910	44	Sri Lanka	2	
151	(Uganda) Fadilah Mohamed Rafi (Uganda) Tracy Naluwooza	9,186	45	Uganda	1	Highest ranked African
Reserve
27	(Chinese Taipei) Hu Ling-fang (Chinese Taipei) Jheng Yu-chieh	35,890	2	Chinese Taipei	5	
30	(Thailand) Ornnicha Jongsathapornparn (Thailand) Sukitta Suwachai	34,180	4	Thailand	3	
33	(Chinese Taipei) Lee Chih-chen (Chinese Taipei) Lin Yen-yu	32,760	5	Chinese Taipei	6	
36	(Indonesia) Apriyani Rahayu (Indonesia) Siti Fadia Silva Ramadhanti	31,150	7	Indonesia	3	
38	(Japan) Kokona Ishikawa (Japan) Mio Konegawa	31,130	8	Japan	5	
41	(Chinese Taipei) Lin Xiao-min (Chinese Taipei) Wang Yu-qiao	29,350	10	Chinese Taipei	7	
43	(Hong Kong) Fan Ka Yan (Hong Kong) Yau Mau Ying	29,282	11	Hong Kong	3	
44	(Indonesia) Siti Sarah Azzahra (Indonesia) Agnia Sri Rahayu	29,260	12	Indonesia	4	
46	(Chinese Taipei) Teng Chun-hsun (Chinese Taipei) Yang Chu-yun	29,020	13	Chinese Taipei	8	
47	(Indonesia) Arlya Nabila Thesa Munggaran (Indonesia) Az Zahra Ditya Ramadhani	28,200	14	Indonesia	5	
51	(Japan) Arisa Igarashi (Japan) Ayako Sakuramoto	27,008	15	Japan	6	
52	(Thailand) Tidapron Kleebyeesun (Thailand) Nattamon Laisuan	26,950	16	Thailand	4	
53	(Indonesia) Jesita Putri Miantoro (Indonesia) Febi Setianingrum	26,590	17	Indonesia	6	
57	(Chinese Taipei) Chen Su-yu (Chinese Taipei) Hsieh Yi-en	25,590	19	Chinese Taipei	9	
58	(Chinese Taipei) Cheng Yu-pei (Chinese Taipei) Sun Yu-hsing	25,500	20	Chinese Taipei	10	
63	(Chinese Taipei) Nicole Gonzales Chan (Chinese Taipei) Yang Chu-yun	24,180	21	Chinese Taipei	11	
64	(Malaysia) Ong Xin Yee (Malaysia) Carmen Ting	23,700	22	Malaysia	3	
66	(Chinese Taipei) Hsu Ya-ching (Chinese Taipei) Sung Yu-hsuan	22,770	24	Chinese Taipei	12	
Decline
7	(China) Chen Qingchen (China) Jia Yifan	66,106	No	China		
10	(India) Treesa Jolly (India) Gayatri Gopichand	60,741	No	India		
21	(Thailand) Benyapa Aimsaard (Thailand) Nuntakarn Aimsaard	43,665	No	Thailand		
22	(India) Tanisha Crasto (India) Ashwini Ponnappa	41,910	No	India		
23	(South Korea) Kim So-yeong (South Korea) Kong Hee-yong	41,500	No	South Korea		
24	(South Korea) Lee Yu-lim (South Korea) Shin Seung-chan	38,680	No	South Korea		
28	(South Korea) Jeong Na-eun (South Korea) Kim Hye-jeong	35,840	No	South Korea		Reserved 3
29	(Denmark) Julie Finne-Ipsen (Denmark) Mai Surrow	34,280	No	Denmark		
34	(Canada) Jackie Dent (Canada) Crystal Lai	32,440	No	Canada		
37	(Denmark) Amalie Cecilie Kudsk (Denmark) Signe Schulz	31,130	No	Denmark		
40	(England) Chloe Coney (England) Estelle van Leeuwen	29,378	No	England		
48	(Canada) Jacqueline Cheung (Canada) Catherine Choi	27,911	No	Canada		
49	(Denmark) Maiken Fruergaard (Denmark) Sara Thygesen	27,687	No	Denmark		
50	(Sweden) Moa Sjöö (Sweden) Tiida Sjöö	27,623	No	Sweden		
54	(Denmark) Natasja P. Anthonisen (Denmark) Maiken Fruergaard	26,540	No	Denmark		
55	(Australia) Setyana Mapasa (Australia) Angela Yu	26,500	No	Australia		
56	(China) Zhang Shuxian (China) Zheng Yu	26,151	No	China		Reserved 18
60	(United States) Francesca Corbett (United States) Allison Lee	24,630	No	United States		
65	(China) Li Wenmei (China) Zhang Shuxian	23,540	No	China		Reserved 23
67	(China) Keng Shuliang (China) Wang Tingge	21,668	No	China		Reserved 25
78	(Netherlands) Debora Jille (Denmark) Sara Thygesen	18,720	No	Netherlands		
95	(United States) Annie Xu (United States) Kerry Xu	15,386	No	United States		
97	(Germany) Julia Meyer (Germany) Leona Michalski	15,110	No	Germany		
105	(Guatemala) Diana Corleto Soto (Guatemala) Nikté Sotomayor	14,098	No	Guatemala		
106	(Mexico) Romina Fregoso (Mexico) Miriam Rodríguez	14,053	No	Mexico		
109	(Poland) Anastasia Khomich (Poland) Daria Zimnol	13,560	No	Poland		
112	(Australia) Nozomi Shimizu (Australia) Gronya Somerville	13,160	No	Australia		Not eligible
116	(Italy) Martina Corsini (Italy) Emma Piccinin	12,454	No	Italy		
126	(South Korea) Kim Bo-ryeong (South Korea) Kim So-yeong	11,160	No	South Korea		

=== Mixed doubles ===
According to the phase 2 updated by BWF, the following table is the invitation results.

Players who ranked from 1 to 8, whose association could nominate 4 players.
Players who ranked from 9 to 24, whose association could nominate 3 players.
Players who ranked from 25 to 150, whose association could nominate 2 players.

Rank	Nation / Player	Points	Eligibility			Note
Qualifiers
1	(China) Jiang Zhenbang (China) Wei Yaxin	95,350	1	China	1	Highest ranked Asian
2	(China) Feng Yanzhe (China) Huang Dongping	86,760	2	China	2	
3	(Malaysia) Goh Soon Huat (Malaysia) Shevon Jemie Lai	80,512	3	Malaysia	1	
4	(Malaysia) Chen Tang Jie (Malaysia) Toh Ee Wei	78,140	4	Malaysia	2	
5	(Hong Kong) Tang Chun Man (Hong Kong) Tse Ying Suet	77,140	5	Hong Kong	1	
6	(China) Guo Xinwa (China) Chen Fanghui	74,360	6	China	3	
7	(Denmark) Jesper Toft (Denmark) Amalie Magelund	67,842	7	Denmark	1	Highest ranked European
8	(Chinese Taipei) Yang Po-hsuan (Chinese Taipei) Hu Ling-fang	67,526	8	Chinese Taipei	1	
9	(Japan) Hiroki Midorikawa (Japan) Natsu Saito	66,644	9	Japan	1	
10	(France) Thom Gicquel (France) Delphine Delrue	66,284	10	France	1	Host nation's presenter
11	(Thailand) Dechapol Puavaranukroh (Thailand) Supissara Paewsampran	62,240	11	Thailand	1	
13	(China) Cheng Xing (China) Zhang Chi	60,260	47	China	4	
14	(Malaysia) Hoo Pang Ron (Malaysia) Cheng Su Yin	55,443	12	Malaysia	3	
16	(Thailand) Ruttanapak Oupthong (Thailand) Jhenicha Sudjaipraparat	48,330	13	Thailand	2	
17	(India) Dhruv Kapila (India) Tanisha Crasto	46,229	14	India	1	
19	(Chinese Taipei) Chen Cheng-kuan (Chinese Taipei) Hsu Yin-hui	45,278	15	Chinese Taipei	2	
20	(Indonesia) Jafar Hidayatullah (Indonesia) Felisha Pasaribu	43,880	16	Indonesia	1	
21	(Indonesia) Rinov Rivaldy (Indonesia) Pitha Haningtyas Mentari	42,210	17	Indonesia	2	
22	(Thailand) Pakkapon Teeraratsakul (Thailand) Phataimas Muenwong	42,080	18	Thailand	3	
23	(Scotland) Alexander Dunn (Scotland) Julie MacPherson	41,240	19	Scotland	1	
24	(Chinese Taipei) Ye Hong-wei (Chinese Taipei) Nicole Gonzales Chan	38,630	20	Chinese Taipei	3	
26	(Chinese Taipei) Lu Ming-che (Chinese Taipei) Hung En-tzu	38,210	48	Chinese Taipei	4	
27	(Singapore) Terry Hee (Singapore) Jin Yujia	37,300	21	Singapore	1	
28	(England) Callum Hemming (England) Estelle van Leeuwen	36,199	22	England	1	
31	(India) Rohan Kapoor (India) Gadde Ruthvika Shivani	35,230	23	India	2	
38	(Japan) Yuichi Shimogami (Japan) Sayaka Hobara	33,200	24	Japan	2	
39	(France) Julien Maio (France) Léa Palermo	32,900	25	France	25	
40	(United States) Presley Smith (United States) Jennie Gai	32,587	26	United States	1	Highest ranked Pan American
46	(England) Rory Easton (England) Lizzie Tolman	29,675	27	England	2	
52	(Algeria) Koceila Mammeri (Algeria) Tanina Mammeri	26,700	28	Algeria	1	Highest ranked African
55	(Ukraine) Oleksii Titov (Ukraine) Yevheniia Kantemyr	26,700	29	Ukraine	1	
56	(Spain) Rubén García (Spain) Lucía Rodríguez	25,355	30	Spain	1	
63	(Denmark) Mathias Christiansen (Denmark) Alexandra Bøje	23,340	31	Denmark	2	
68	(Brazil) Fabrício Farias (Brazil) Jaqueline Lima	22,775	32	Brazil	1	
69	(Canada) Jonathan Lai (Canada) Crystal Lai	22,390	33	Canada	1	
70	(Macau) Leong Iok Chong (Macau) Ng Weng Chi	21,874	34	Macau	1	
78	(Germany) Malik Bourakkadi (Germany) Leona Michalski	20,310	35	Germany	2	
80	(Guatemala) Christopher Martinez (Guatemala) Diana Corleto Soto	20,102	36	Guatemala	1	
83	(United States) Linden Wang (United States) Eva Wang	19,500	37	United States	2	
85	(Canada) Ty Alexander Lindeman (Canada) Josephine Wu	18,626	38	Canada	2	
89	(Slovenia) Miha Ivančič (Slovenia) Petra Polanc	18,215	39	Slovenia	1	
92	(Republic of Ireland) Joshua Magee (Republic of Ireland) Moya Ryan	17,722	40	Ireland	1	
94	(New Zealand) Edward Lau (New Zealand) Shaunna Li	17,363	41	New Zealand	1	Highest ranked Oceanian
101	(Scotland) Adam Pringle (Scotland) Rachel Andrew	16,170	42	Scotland	2	
105	(Serbia) Mihajlo Tomic (Serbia) Andjela Vitman	15,650	43	Serbia	1	
114	(Israel) Misha Zilberman (Israel) Svetlana Zilberman	13,600	44	Israel	1	
118	(Azerbaijan) Jahid Alhasanov (Azerbaijan) Hajar Nuriyeva	13,311	45	Azerbaijan	1	
119	(South Korea) Lee Jong-min (South Korea) Chae Yoo-jung	13,300	46	South Korea	1	
Reserve
15	(Malaysia) Tan Kian Meng (Malaysia) Lai Pei Jing	49,550	2	Malaysia	4	
29	(Indonesia) Rehan Naufal Kusharjanto (Indonesia) Lisa Ayu Kusumawati	36,180	4	Indonesia	3	
32	(Malaysia) Wong Tien Ci (Malaysia) Lim Chiew Sien	35,160	5	Malaysia	5	
33	(India) Sathish Kumar Karunakaran (India) Aadya Wariyath	35,056	6	India	3	
34	(Indonesia) Amri Syahnawi (Indonesia) Nita Violina Marwah	34,240	7	Indonesia	4	
41	(Indonesia) Adnan Maulana (Indonesia) Indah Cahya Sari Jamil	32,060	8	Indonesia	5	
42	(Chinese Taipei) Wu Hsuan-yi (Chinese Taipei) Yang Chu-yun	30,960	9	Chinese Taipei	5	
44	(India) Ashita Surya (India) Amrutha Pramuthesh	30,650	10	India	4	
45	(Chinese Taipei) Liu Kuang-heng (Chinese Taipei) Jheng Yu-chieh	30,020	11	Chinese Taipei	6	
48	(Chinese Taipei) Lin Bing-wei (Chinese Taipei) Lin Chih-chun	28,440	12	Chinese Taipei	7	
50	(China) Zhou Zhihong (China) Yang Jiayi	28,040	13	China	5	
53	(Japan) Hiroki Nishi (Japan) Akari Sato	26,459	15	Japan	3	
54	(Malaysia) Yap Roy King (Malaysia) Valeree Siow	26,340	16	Malaysia	6	
57	(Indonesia) Rehan Naufal Kusharjanto (Indonesia) Gloria Emanuelle Widjaja	25,250	17	Indonesia	6	
58	(Japan) Yuta Watanabe (Japan) Maya Taguchi	25,130	18	Japan	4	
61	(Indonesia) Marwan Faza (Indonesia) Aisyah Salsabila Putri Pranata	23,660	20	Indonesia	7	
64	(Japan) Yuta Watanabe (Japan) Arisa Igarashi	23,210	22	Japan	5	
65	(Indonesia) Zaidan Arrafi Awal Nabawi (Indonesia) Jessica Maya Rismawardani	23,180	23	Indonesia	8	
67	(Indonesia) Dejan Ferdinansyah (Indonesia) Siti Fadia Silva Ramadhanti	22,923	24	Indonesia	9	
71	(India) Bokka Navaneeth (India) Ritika Thaker	21,800	25	India	5	
Decline
12	(Indonesia) Dejan Ferdinansyah (Indonesia) Gloria Emanuelle Widjaja	62,150	No	Indonesia		
18	(Denmark) Mads Vestergaard (Denmark) Christine Busch	45,340	No	Denmark		
25	(South Korea) Kim Won-ho (South Korea) Jeong Na-eun	38,540	No	South Korea		
30	(India) B. Sumeeth Reddy (India) N. Sikki Reddy	35,480	No	India		
35	(Denmark) Rasmus Espersen (Denmark) Amalie Cecilie Kudsk	33,690	No	Denmark		
36	(England) Gregory Mairs (England) Jenny Mairs	33,410	No	England		
37	(Netherlands) Robin Tabeling (Denmark) Alexandra Bøje	33,250	No	Netherlands; Denmark		
43	(Germany) Jones Ralfy Jansen (Germany) Thuc Phuong Nguyen	30,670	No	Germany		
47	(Singapore) Terry Hee (Singapore) Jessica Tan	28,770	No	Singapore		
49	(Hong Kong) Lui Chun Wai (Hong Kong) Fu Chi Yan	28,163	No	Hong Kong		
51	(Thailand) Dechapol Puavaranukroh (Thailand) Sapsiree Taerattanachai	27,060	No	Thailand		Reserved 14
59	(Thailand) Supak Jomkoh (Thailand) Sapsiree Taerattanachai	24,370	No	Thailand		Reserved 19
60	(Denmark) Kristoffer Kolding (Denmark) Mette Werge	23,860	No	Denmark		
62	(Hong Kong) Tang Chun Man (Hong Kong) Ng Tsz Yau	23,416	No	Hong Kong		Reserved 21
66	(South Korea) Seo Seung-jae (South Korea) Chae Yoo-jung	23,000	No	South Korea		
76	(Germany) Jan Colin Völker (Germany) Isabel Lohau	20,420	No	Germany		
79	(Netherlands) Robin Tabeling (Netherlands) Selena Piek	20,250	No	Netherlands		
86	(South Korea) Ko Sung-hyun (South Korea) Eom Hye-won	18,600	No	South Korea		
