= 2025 Malaysia Masters =

2025 badminton tournament in Malaysia

Tournament details
- Dates: 20–25 May
- Edition: 17th
- Level: Super 500
- Total prize money: US$475,000
- Venue: Axiata Arena
- Location: Kuala Lumpur, Malaysia

Champions
- Men's singles: (China) Li Shifeng
- Women's singles: (China) Wang Zhiyi
- Men's doubles: (Malaysia) Man Wei Chong (Malaysia) Tee Kai Wun
- Women's doubles: (China) Liu Shengshu (China) Tan Ning
- Mixed doubles: (China) Feng Yanzhe (China) Huang Dongping

The 2025 Malaysia Masters (officially known as the Perodua Malaysia Masters 2025 presented by Daihatsu for sponsorship reasons) was a badminton tournament that took place at the Axiata Arena, Kuala Lumpur, Malaysia, from 20 to 25 May 2025 and had a total prize of US$475,000.

== Tournament ==
The 2025 Malaysia Masters was the twelfth tournament of the 2025 BWF World Tour and was part of the Malaysia Masters championships, which have been held since 2009. This tournament was organised by the Badminton Association of Malaysia with sanction from the BWF.

=== Venue ===
This international tournament was held at the Axiata Arena inside the KL Sports City in Kuala Lumpur, Malaysia.

=== Point distribution ===
Below was the point distribution table for each phase of the tournament based on the BWF points system for the BWF World Tour Super 500 event.

Winner	Runner-up	3/4	5/8	9/16	17/32	33/64	65/128
9,200	7,800	6,420	5,040	3,600	2,220	880	430

=== Prize pool ===
The total prize money is US$475,000 and will be distributed according to BWF regulations.

Event	Winner	Finalist	Semi-finals	Quarter-finals	Last 16
Singles	$35,625	$18,050	$6,887.50	$2,850	$1,662.50
Doubles	$37,525	$18,050	$6,650	$3,443.75	$1,781.25

== Men's singles ==
=== Seeds ===
1. (Denmark) Anders Antonsen (withdrew)
2. (China) Li Shifeng (champion)
3. (Chinese Taipei) Chou Tien-chen (first round)
4. (Japan) Kodai Naraoka (semi-finals)
5. (Japan) Kenta Nishimoto (first round)
6. (China) Lu Guangzu (first round)
7. (China) Weng Hongyang (quarter-finals)
8. (Hong Kong) Ng Ka Long (quarter-finals)

=== Finals ===
Semi-finals
(Japan) Yushi Tanaka	18	22
Q2	(India) Srikanth Kidambi	21	24
4	(Japan) Kodai Naraoka	15	15
2	(China) Li Shifeng	21	21

Final
Q2	(India) Srikanth Kidambi	11	9
2	(China) Li Shifeng	21	21

=== Top half ===
==== Section 1 ====
First round
3	(Chinese Taipei) Chou T-c	13	14
(India) S Karunakaran	21	21
(France) C Popov	21	21
(Hong Kong) J Gunawan	17	18
5	(Japan) K Nishimoto	21	17	16
(India) Prannoy H. S.	19	21	21
(Japan) Y Tanaka	21	21
Q4	(Vietnam) Nguyễn H Đ	12	13

Second round
(India) S Karunakaran	14	16
(France) C Popov	21	21
(India) Prannoy H. S.	9	18
(Japan) Y Tanaka	21	21

Quarter-finals
(France) C Popov	18	21	16
(Japan) Y Tanaka	21	16	21

==== Section 2 ====
First round
6	(China) Lu GZ	21	21	11
Q2	(India) S Kidambi	23	13	21
(Republic of Ireland) N Nguyen	10	21	21
(Malaysia) Leong J H	21	18	9
SWM	(France) T J Popov	21	21
(China) Wang ZX	17	8
(India) A Shetty	20	21	21
(Canada) B Yang	22	10	8

Second round
Q2	(India) S Kidambi	23	21
(Republic of Ireland) N Nguyen	21	17
SWM	(France) T J Popov	21	21
(India) A Shetty	13	17

Quarter-finals
Q2	(India) S Kidambi	24	17	22
SWM	(France) T J Popov	22	21	20

=== Bottom half ===
==== Section 3 ====
First round
(Chinese Taipei) Su L-y	13	13
(Indonesia) A Farhan	21	21
(China) Lei LX	20	21	11
7	(China) Weng HY	22	16	21
Q1	(Chinese Taipei) Huang P-h	14	14
(Indonesia) C A Dwi Wardoyo	21	21
PFQ	(Malaysia) J Hoh	14	20
4	(Japan) K Naraoka	21	22

Second round
(Indonesia) A Farhan	21	16	17
7	(China) Weng HY	19	21	21
(Indonesia) C A Dwi Wardoyo	11	16
4	(Japan) K Naraoka	21	21

Quarter-finals
7	(China) Weng HY	12	19
4	(Japan) K Naraoka	21	21

==== Section 4 ====
First round
Q3	(China) Zhu XC	18	19
(Denmark) R Gemke	21	21
(Malaysia) Ng T Y	22	4^{r}
8	(Hong Kong) Ng K L	20	3
(India) P Rajawat	15	17
(Singapore) J Teh	21	21
(Thailand) K Wangcharoen	9	8
2	(China) Li SF	21	21

Second round
(Denmark) R Gemke	18	18
8	(Hong Kong) Ng K L	21	21
(Singapore) J Teh	10	17
2	(China) Li SF	21	21

Quarter-finals
8	(Hong Kong) Ng K L	10	12
2	(China) Li SF	21	21

== Women's singles ==
=== Seeds ===
1. (China) Wang Zhiyi (champion)
2. (China) Han Yue (final)
3. (Japan) Akane Yamaguchi (semi-finals)
4. (China) Chen Yufei (withdrew)
5. (Thailand) Busanan Ongbamrungphan (withdrew)
6. (Thailand) Ratchanok Intanon (semi-finals)
7. (China) Gao Fangjie (quarter-finals)
8. (Indonesia) Putri Kusuma Wardani (quarter-finals)

=== Finals ===
Semi-finals
1	(China) Wang Zhiyi	21	21
6	(Thailand) Ratchanok Intanon	17	16
3	(Japan) Akane Yamaguchi	19	16
2	(China) Han Yue	21	21

Final
1	(China) Wang Zhiyi	13	21	21
2	(China) Han Yue	21	13	18

=== Top half ===
==== Section 1 ====
First round
1	(China) Wang ZY	21	21
(Japan) A Takahashi	13	10
(China) Han QX	10	21	21
(Malaysia) Letshanaa K	21	19	12
SWM	(India) P. V. Sindhu	11	21	15
(Vietnam) Nguyễn T L	21	14	21
Q3	(Thailand) T Kleebyeesun	18	17
(Denmark) L Christophersen	21	21

Second round
1	(China) Wang ZY	21	21
(China) Han QX	8	17
(Vietnam) Nguyễn T L	20	21	21
(Denmark) L Christophersen	22	11	18

Quarter-finals
1	(China) Wang ZY	21	21
(Vietnam) Nguyễn T L	11	15

==== Section 2 ====
First round
6	(Thailand) R Intanon	21	21
(Malaysia) Goh J W	7	15
Q4	(Chinese Taipei) Huang C-p	14	17
Q2	(Chinese Taipei) Hung Y-t	21	21
SWM	(Denmark) L Kjærsfeldt	18	21	21
Q1	(Myanmar) Thet Htar T	21	15	19
(Chinese Taipei) Sung S-y	10	11
(Canada) M Li	21	21

Second round
6	(Thailand) R Intanon	21	21
Q2	(Chinese Taipei) Hung Y-t	14	12
SWM	(Denmark) L Kjærsfeldt	22	15	11
(Canada) M Li	20	21	21

Quarter-finals
6	(Thailand) R Intanon	24	24	21
(Canada) M Li	26	22	12

=== Bottom half ===
==== Section 3 ====
First round
(Chinese Taipei) Lin H-t	21	22
(India) U Hooda	12	20
PFQ	(Chinese Taipei) Huang Y-h	11	21	18
7	(China) Gao FJ	21	18	21
(Japan) N Okuhara	21	21
(Japan) H Akechi	14	19
(Chinese Taipei) Tung C-t	14	12
3	(Japan) A Yamaguchi	21	21

Second round
(Chinese Taipei) Lin H-t	13	10
7	(China) Gao FJ	21	21
(Japan) N Okuhara	21	24	3
3	(Japan) A Yamaguchi	18	26	21

Quarter-finals
7	(China) Gao FJ	21	16	20
3	(Japan) A Yamaguchi	18	21	22

==== Section 4 ====
First round
(Japan) N Nidaira	16	8^{r}
PFQ	(Canada) WY Zhang	21	9
(India) A Kashyap	9	8
8	(Indonesia) P K Wardani	21	21
(India) M Bansod	21	18	8
(Chinese Taipei) Chiu P-c	19	21	21
(Chinese Taipei) Liang T-y	8	13
2	(China) Han Y	21	21

Second round
PFQ	(Canada) WY Zhang	11	8
8	(Indonesia) P K Wardani	21	21
(Chinese Taipei) Chiu P-c	9	11
2	(China) Han Y	21	21

Quarter-finals
8	(Indonesia) P K Wardani	12	13
2	(China) Han Y	21	21

== Men's doubles ==
=== Seeds ===
1. (Denmark) Kim Astrup / Anders Skaarup Rasmussen (semi-finals)
2. (Malaysia) Goh Sze Fei / Nur Izzuddin (quarter-finals)
3. (China) Liang Weikeng / Wang Chang (quarter-finals)
4. (Malaysia) Aaron Chia / Soh Wooi Yik (final)
5. (Malaysia) Man Wei Chong / Tee Kai Wun (champions)
6. (China) Chen Boyang / Liu Yi (first round)
7. (Denmark) Rasmus Kjær / Frederik Søgaard (quarter-finals)
8. (Thailand) Kittinupong Kedren / Dechapol Puavaranukroh (first round)

=== Finals ===
Semi-finals
1	(Denmark) Kim Astrup (Denmark) Anders Skaarup Rasmussen	19	21	15
4	(Malaysia) Aaron Chia (Malaysia) Soh Wooi Yik	21	17	21
(Japan) Takuro Hoki (Japan) Yugo Kobayashi	12	14
5	(Malaysia) Man Wei Chong (Malaysia) Tee Kai Wun	21	21

Final
4	(Malaysia) Aaron Chia (Malaysia) Soh Wooi Yik	12	21	16
5	(Malaysia) Man Wei Chong (Malaysia) Tee Kai Wun	21	15	21

=== Top half ===
==== Section 1 ====
First round
1	(Denmark) K Astrup (Denmark) A S Rasmussen	21	21
(China) Xie HN (China) Zeng WH	10	17
(Chinese Taipei) Chiang C-w (Chinese Taipei) Wu H-y	14	16
(Malaysia) Low H Y (Malaysia) Ng E C	21	21
6	(China) Chen BY (China) Liu Yi	25	21	16
(Denmark) D Lundgaard (Denmark) M Vestergaard	27	18	21
(South Korea) Kim G-j (South Korea) Kim S-r	21	21
Q2	(France) J Maio (France) W Villeger	17	15

Second round
1	(Denmark) K Astrup (Denmark) A S Rasmussen	21	21
(Malaysia) Low H Y (Malaysia) Ng E C	9	12
(Denmark) D Lundgaard (Denmark) M Vestergaard	22	21
(South Korea) Kim G-j (South Korea) Kim S-r	20	15

Quarter-finals
1	(Denmark) K Astrup (Denmark) A S Rasmussen	21	22
(Denmark) D Lundgaard (Denmark) M Vestergaard	16	20

==== Section 2 ====
First round
4	(Malaysia) A Chia (Malaysia) Soh W Y	21	21
(Chinese Taipei) Chiu H-c (Chinese Taipei) Wang C-l	18	16
(Chinese Taipei) Liu K-h (Chinese Taipei) Yang P-h	21	21
(Malaysia) N M Azriyn A (Malaysia) Tan W K	19	15
7	(Denmark) R Kjær (Denmark) F Søgaard	21	21
(Chinese Taipei) Lu M-c (Chinese Taipei) Tang K-w	10	14
Q3	(Malaysia) Kang K X (Malaysia) A Tai	12	21	21
Q1	(Denmark) W K Boe (Denmark) C F Kjær	21	11	17

Second round
4	(Malaysia) A Chia (Malaysia) Soh W Y	21	21
(Chinese Taipei) Liu K-h (Chinese Taipei) Yang P-h	13	16
7	(Denmark) R Kjær (Denmark) F Søgaard	21	24	21
Q3	(Malaysia) Kang K X (Malaysia) A Tai	10	26	16

Quarter-finals
4	(Malaysia) A Chia (Malaysia) Soh W Y	21	21
7	(Denmark) R Kjær (Denmark) F Søgaard	10	19

=== Bottom half ===
==== Section 3 ====
First round
(China) Huang D (China) Liu Ya	21	20	15
(Japan) T Hoki (Japan) Y Kobayashi	19	22	21
(Malaysia) Choong H J (Malaysia) M Haikal	21	21
8	(Thailand) K Kedren (Thailand) D Puavaranukroh	15	18
Q4	(Chinese Taipei) Chang K-c (Chinese Taipei) Po L-w	24	19	18
(France) C Popov (France) T J Popov	22	21	21
(Malaysia) Ong Y S (Malaysia) Teo E Y	21	15	15
3	(China) Liang WK (China) Wang C	9	21	21

Second round
(Japan) T Hoki (Japan) Y Kobayashi	21	21
(Malaysia) Choong H J (Malaysia) M Haikal	14	13
(France) C Popov (France) T J Popov	17	15
3	(China) Liang WK (China) Wang C	21	21

Quarter-finals
(Japan) T Hoki (Japan) Y Kobayashi	21	21
3	(China) Liang WK (China) Wang C	10	13

==== Section 4 ====
First round
(Malaysia) J Arif (Malaysia) Yap R K	11	20
(Japan) H Midorikawa (Japan) K Yamashita	21	22
PFQ	(India) P Roy (India) K S Pratheek	15	21
5	(Malaysia) Man W C (Malaysia) Tee K W	21	23
(Chinese Taipei) Chen Z-r (Chinese Taipei) Lin Y-c	21	21
(India) H Amsakarunan (India) R Kumar	13	18
(France) É Adam (France) L Rossi	16	13
2	(Malaysia) Goh S F (Malaysia) N Izzuddin	21	21

Second round
(Japan) H Midorikawa (Japan) K Yamashita	17	13
5	(Malaysia) Man W C (Malaysia) Tee K W	21	21
(Chinese Taipei) Chen Z-r (Chinese Taipei) Lin Y-c	19	13
2	(Malaysia) Goh S F (Malaysia) N Izzuddin	21	21

Quarter-finals
5	(Malaysia) Man W C (Malaysia) Tee K W	19	21	21
2	(Malaysia) Goh S F (Malaysia) N Izzuddin	21	7	16

== Women's doubles ==
=== Seeds ===
1. (China) Liu Shengshu / Tan Ning (champions)
2. (Japan) Nami Matsuyama / Chiharu Shida (second round)
3. (Malaysia) Pearly Tan / Thinaah Muralitharan (semi-finals)
4. (China) Li Yijing / Luo Xumin (first round)
5. (Indonesia) Febriana Dwipuji Kusuma / Amallia Cahaya Pratiwi (quarter-finals)
6. (Chinese Taipei) Hsieh Pei-shan / Hung En-tzu (second round)
7. (China) Jia Yifan / Zhang Shuxian (final)
8. (Chinese Taipei) Hsu Yin-hui / Lin Jhih-yun (quarter-finals)

=== Finals ===
Semi-finals
1	(China) Liu Shengshu (China) Tan Ning	12	21	21
(Indonesia) Apriyani Rahayu (Indonesia) Febi Setianingrum	21	7	9
3	(Malaysia) Pearly Tan (Malaysia) Thinaah Muralitharan	16	21	14
7	(China) Jia Yifan (China) Zhang Shuxian	21	15	21

Final
1	(China) Liu Shengshu (China) Tan Ning	21	21
7	(China) Jia Yifan (China) Zhang Shuxian	17	18

=== Top half ===
==== Section 1 ====
First round
1	(China) Liu SS (China) Tan N	21	21
(Indonesia) M T Puspita Sari (Indonesia) R A Rose	13	6
Q3	(Chinese Taipei) Sung Y-h (Chinese Taipei) Yang Y-h	21	13	20
(Thailand) T Kleebyeesun (Thailand) N Laisuan	17	21	22
6	(Chinese Taipei) Hsieh P-s (Chinese Taipei) Hung E-t	21	21
(Hong Kong) Lui L L (Hong Kong) Tsang H Y	19	16
(Thailand) O Jongsathapornparn (Thailand) S Suwachai	15	11
Q4	(China) Keng SL (China) Li HZ	21	21

Second round
1	(China) Liu SS (China) Tan N	21	21
(Thailand) T Kleebyeesun (Thailand) N Laisuan	13	8
6	(Chinese Taipei) Hsieh P-s (Chinese Taipei) Hung E-t	15	21	14
Q4	(China) Keng SL (China) Li HZ	21	13	21

Quarter-finals
1	(China) Liu SS (China) Tan N	21	21
Q4	(China) Keng SL (China) Li HZ	18	10

==== Section 2 ====
First round
4	(China) Li YJ (China) Luo XM	21	17	19
(Indonesia) A Rahayu (Indonesia) F Setianingrum	11	21	21
(Chinese Taipei) Hsu Y-c (Chinese Taipei) Sung Y-h	21	21
(Chinese Taipei) Hu L-f (Chinese Taipei) Jheng Y-c	18	13
8	(Chinese Taipei) Hsu Y-h (Chinese Taipei) Lin J-y	21	21
(India) K Selvam (India) S Singhi	14	18
(India) V Khadkekar (India) A Khan	19	21	13
(India) P Alvekar (India) M Deshpande	21	19	21

Second round
(Indonesia) A Rahayu (Indonesia) F Setianingrum	21	21
(Chinese Taipei) Hsu Y-c (Chinese Taipei) Sung Y-h	18	16
8	(Chinese Taipei) Hsu Y-h (Chinese Taipei) Lin J-y	21	21
(India) P Alvekar (India) M Deshpande	9	14

Quarter-finals
(Indonesia) A Rahayu (Indonesia) F Setianingrum	18	21	21
8	(Chinese Taipei) Hsu Y-h (Chinese Taipei) Lin J-y	21	16	9

=== Bottom half ===
==== Section 3 ====
First round
(Chinese Taipei) Chen Y-f (Chinese Taipei) Sun L-c	21	21
Q2	(Malaysia) Ho L E (Malaysia) A Yap	6	18
Q1	(China) Li WM (China) Wang YD	15	21	10
5	(Indonesia) F D Kusuma (Indonesia) A C Pratiwi	21	19	21
(Thailand) P Phatcharaphisutsin (Thailand) N Sukklad	21	21
(India) R Ganesh (India) S Sikkandar	10	12
(Hong Kong) Fan K Y (Hong Kong) Yau M Y	17	16
3	(Malaysia) P Tan (Malaysia) Thinaah M	21	21

Second round
(Chinese Taipei) Chen Y-f (Chinese Taipei) Sun L-c	13	13
5	(Indonesia) F D Kusuma (Indonesia) A C Pratiwi	21	21
(Thailand) P Phatcharaphisutsin (Thailand) N Sukklad	13	15
3	(Malaysia) P Tan (Malaysia) Thinaah M	21	21

Quarter-finals
5	(Indonesia) F D Kusuma (Indonesia) A C Pratiwi	14	14
3	(Malaysia) P Tan (Malaysia) Thinaah M	21	21

==== Section 4 ====
First round
(China) Chen QC (China) Wang TG	19	19
(Malaysia) Go P K (Malaysia) Teoh M X	21	21
(Malaysia) Ong X Y (Malaysia) C Ting	11	21	13
7	(China) Jia YF (China) Zhang SX	21	17	21
(Indonesia) L T Mayasari (Indonesia) S F S Ramadhanti	21	21
(Chinese Taipei) Chen S-y (Chinese Taipei) Hsieh Y-e	14	11
(Canada) J Dent (Canada) C Lai	21	10	16
2	(Japan) N Matsuyama (Japan) C Shida	19	21	21

Second round
(Malaysia) Go P K (Malaysia) Teoh M X	6	13
7	(China) Jia YF (China) Zhang SX	21	21
(Indonesia) L T Mayasari (Indonesia) S F S Ramadhanti	19	21	21
2	(Japan) N Matsuyama (Japan) C Shida	21	19	15

Quarter-finals
7	(China) Jia YF (China) Zhang SX	21	15	21
(Indonesia) L T Mayasari (Indonesia) S F S Ramadhanti	15	21	14

== Mixed doubles ==
=== Seeds ===
1. (China) Jiang Zhenbang / Wei Yaxin (final)
2. (China) Feng Yanzhe / Huang Dongping (champions)
3. (Malaysia) Goh Soon Huat / Shevon Jemie Lai (first round)
4. (China) Guo Xinwa / Chen Fanghui (second round)
5. (Denmark) Jesper Toft / Amalie Magelund (first round)
6. (Thailand) Dechapol Puavaranukroh / Supissara Paewsampran (quarter-finals)
7. (China) Cheng Xing / Zhang Chi (semi-finals)
8. (Malaysia) Hoo Pang Ron / Cheng Su Yin (withdrew)

=== Finals ===
Semi-finals
1	(China) Jiang Zhenbang (China) Wei Yaxin	15	22	21
7	(China) Cheng Xing (China) Zhang Chi	21	20	19
(Chinese Taipei) Ye Hong-wei (Chinese Taipei) Nicole Gonzales Chan	10	7
2	(China) Feng Yanzhe (China) Huang Dongping	21	21

Final
1	(China) Jiang Zhenbang (China) Wei Yaxin	17	21	16
2	(China) Feng Yanzhe (China) Huang Dongping	21	14	21

=== Top half ===
==== Section 1 ====
First round
1	(China) Jiang ZB (China) Wei YX	21	21
(India) A Surya (India) A Pramuthesh	12	10
Q1	(Malaysia) Too M Y (Malaysia) Lee Y S	9	13
PFQ	(Thailand) R Makkasasithorn (Thailand) N Laisuan	21	21
SWM	(India) D Kapila (India) T Crasto	21	15	21
(Indonesia) A Maulana (Indonesia) I C S Jamil	18	21	14
(Hong Kong) Lui C W (Hong Kong) Fu C Y	23	8
(France) J Maio (France) L Palermo	25	21

Second round
1	(China) Jiang ZB (China) Wei YX	21	21
PFQ	(Thailand) R Makkasasithorn (Thailand) N Laisuan	12	17
SWM	(India) D Kapila (India) T Crasto	21	18	21
(France) J Maio (France) L Palermo	17	21	15

Quarter-finals
1	(China) Jiang ZB (China) Wei YX	24	21
SWM	(India) D Kapila (India) T Crasto	22	13

==== Section 2 ====
First round
4	(China) Guo XW (China) Chen FH	21	21
(India) R Kapoor (India) R Gadde	10	14
(Thailand) P Horbanluekit (Thailand) S Taerattanachai	14	21	17
(Indonesia) D Ferdinansyah (Indonesia) S F S Ramadhanti	21	19	21
7	(China) Cheng X (China) Zhang C	22	21
(Malaysia) Chen T J (Malaysia) Chen W T	20	15
PFQ	(Indonesia) V Y Mulia (Indonesia) L A Kusumawati	21	21
(India) S Karunakaran (India) A Variyath	15	16

Second round
4	(China) Guo XW (China) Chen FH	15	22
(Indonesia) D Ferdinansyah (Indonesia) S F S Ramadhanti	21	24
7	(China) Cheng X (China) Zhang C	21	21
PFQ	(Indonesia) V Y Mulia (Indonesia) L A Kusumawati	15	18

Quarter-finals
(Indonesia) D Ferdinansyah (Indonesia) S F S Ramadhanti	21	20	14
7	(China) Cheng X (China) Zhang C	12	22	21

=== Bottom half ===
==== Section 3 ====
First round
(Malaysia) Loo B K (Malaysia) Toh E W	20	21	21
(Chinese Taipei) Lu M-c (Chinese Taipei) Hung E-t	22	18	15
(Chinese Taipei) Ye H-w (Chinese Taipei) N G Chan	21	21
5	(Denmark) J Toft (Denmark) A Magelund	19	15
(Chinese Taipei) Liu K-h (Chinese Taipei) Jheng Y-c	21	21
Q4	(Chinese Taipei) Huang J-h (Chinese Taipei) Sun L-c	15	17
(Denmark) M Vestergaard (Denmark) C Busch	21	21
3	(Malaysia) Goh S H (Malaysia) S J Lai	18	19

Second round
(Malaysia) Loo B K (Malaysia) Toh E W	21	20	18
(Chinese Taipei) Ye H-w (Chinese Taipei) N G Chan	19	22	21
(Chinese Taipei) Liu K-h (Chinese Taipei) Jheng Y-c	15	15
(Denmark) M Vestergaard (Denmark) C Busch	21	21

Quarter-finals
(Chinese Taipei) Ye H-w (Chinese Taipei) N G Chan	21	21
(Denmark) M Vestergaard (Denmark) C Busch	18	19

==== Section 4 ====
First round
Q2	(Thailand) S Jomkoh (Thailand) O Jongsathapornparn	20	19
(Malaysia) Wong T C (Malaysia) Lim C S	22	21
Q3	(Chinese Taipei) Chang K-c (Chinese Taipei) Lin J-y	12	13
6	(Thailand) D Puavaranukroh (Thailand) S Paewsampran	21	21
(Indonesia) A Syahnawi (Indonesia) N V Marwah	21	22
(Chinese Taipei) Chen C-k (Chinese Taipei) Hsu Y-h	18	20
(China) Gao JX (China) Wu MY	16	10
2	(China) Feng YZ (China) Huang DP	21	21

Second round
(Malaysia) Wong T C (Malaysia) Lim C S	14	9
6	(Thailand) D Puavaranukroh (Thailand) S Paewsampran	21	21
(Indonesia) A Syahnawi (Indonesia) N V Marwah	21	11	11
2	(China) Feng YZ (China) Huang DP	19	21	21

Quarter-finals
6	(Thailand) D Puavaranukroh (Thailand) S Paewsampran	21	11	20
2	(China) Feng YZ (China) Huang DP	15	21	22

Preceded by 2025 Thailand Open	BWF World Tour; 2025 BWF season	Succeeded by 2025 Singapore Open
