= Indah Cahya Sari Jamil =

Indonesian badminton player (born 2002)

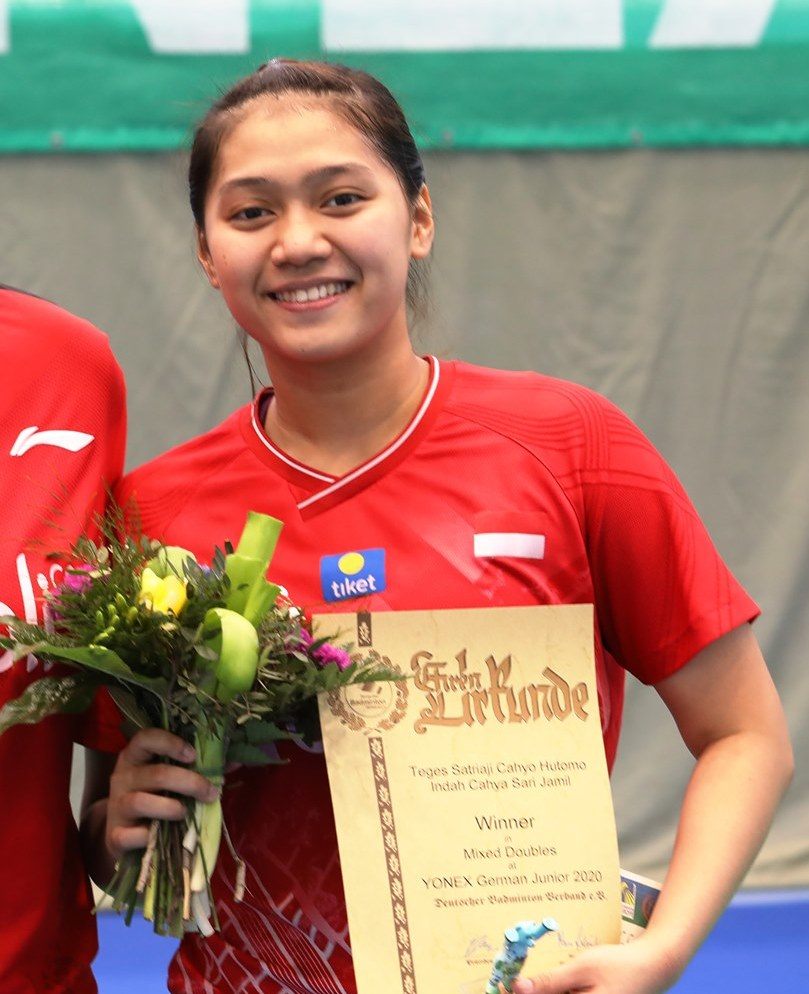
- Jamil in 2020

Personal information
- Born: 16 March 2002 (age 24) Makassar, South Sulawesi, Indonesia
- Height: 1.64 m (5 ft 5 in)
- Spouse: Leo Rolly Carnando (m. 2026)

Sport
- Country: Indonesia
- Sport: Badminton
- Handedness: Right

Mixed doubles
- Highest ranking: 17 (with Adnan Maulana, 12 May 2026)
- Current ranking: 37 (with Adnan Maulana, 27 October 2026)
- BWF profile
Medal record
Women's badminton
Representing Indonesia
World Junior Championships
Gold medal – first place	2018 Markham	Mixed doubles
Gold medal – first place	2019 Kazan	Mixed team
Silver medal – second place	2019 Kazan	Mixed doubles
Asian Junior Championships
Gold medal – first place	2019 Suzhou	Mixed doubles
Silver medal – second place	2019 Suzhou	Mixed team

Indah Cahya Sari Jamil (born 16 March 2002) is an Indonesian badminton player affiliated with PB Djarum since 2014. She was the mixed doubles champion at the 2018 World and 2019 Asian Junior Championships.

== Achievements ==
=== World Junior Championships ===
Mixed doubles
Year	Venue	Partner	Opponent	Score	Result
2018	Markham Pan Am Centre; Markham, Canada	(Indonesia) Leo Rolly Carnando	(Indonesia) Rehan Naufal Kusharjanto (Indonesia) Siti Fadia Silva Ramadhanti	21–15, 21–9	Gold
2019	Kazan Gymnastics Center; Kazan, Russia	(Indonesia) Leo Rolly Carnando	(China) Feng Yanzhe (China) Lin Fangling	17–21, 17–21	Silver

=== Asian Junior Championships ===
Mixed doubles
Year	Venue	Partner	Opponent	Score	Result
2019	Suzhou Olympic Sports Centre; Suzhou, China	(Indonesia) Leo Rolly Carnando	(China) Feng Yanzhe (China) Lin Fangling	16–21, 22–20, 22–20	Gold

=== BWF World Tour (2 titles, 1 runner-up) ===
The BWF World Tour, which was announced on 19 March 2017 and implemented in 2018, is a series of elite badminton tournaments sanctioned by the Badminton World Federation (BWF). The BWF World Tours are divided into levels of World Tour Finals, Super 1000, Super 750, Super 500, Super 300, and the BWF Tour Super 100.

Mixed doubles
Year	Tournament	Level	Partner	Opponent	Score	Result	Ref.
2024 (I)	Indonesia Masters	Super 100	(Indonesia) Adnan Maulana	(Indonesia) Jafar Hidayatullah (Indonesia) Felisha Pasaribu	11–21, 19–21	(silver) Runner-up	
2024	Vietnam Open	Super 100	(Indonesia) Adnan Maulana	(Indonesia) Zaidan Arrafi Awal Nabawi (Indonesia) Jessica Maya Rismawardani	21–15, 21–15	(gold) Winner	
2026	Thailand Masters	Super 300	(Indonesia) Adnan Maulana	(Indonesia) Bobby Setiabudi (Indonesia) Melati Daeva Oktavianti	18–21, 21–19, 21–17	(gold) Winner	

=== BWF International Challenge/Series (2 titles, 7 runners-up) ===
Women's doubles
Year	Tournament	Partner	Opponent	Score	Result	Ref.
2018	Turkey International	(Indonesia) Metya Inayah Cindiani	(Indonesia) Nita Violina Marwah (Indonesia) Putri Syaikah	15–21, 7–21	(silver) Runner-up	

Mixed doubles
Year	Tournament	Partner	Opponent	Score	Result	Ref.
2018	Bangladesh International	(Indonesia) Leo Rolly Carnando	(Malaysia) Hoo Pang Ron (Malaysia) Cheah Yee See	21–16, 21–15	(gold) Winner	
2018	Turkey International	(Indonesia) Leo Rolly Carnando	(Singapore) Danny Bawa Chrisnanta (Singapore) Tan Wei Han	19–21, 21–16, 12–21	(silver) Runner-up	
2022 (I)	Indonesia International	(Indonesia) Adnan Maulana	(Indonesia) Akbar Bintang Cahyono (Indonesia) Marsheilla Gischa Islami	17–21, 21–14, 16–21	(silver) Runner-up	
2024	Vietnam International	(Indonesia) Amri Syahnawi	(Thailand) Pakkapon Teeraratsakul (Thailand) Phataimas Muenwong	19–21, 12–21	(silver) Runner-up	
2024	Slovenia Open	(Indonesia) Amri Syahnawi	(Indonesia) Verrel Yustin Mulia (Indonesia) Priskila Elsadai	15–21, 22–20, 21–19	(gold) Winner	
2024	Austrian Open	(Indonesia) Amri Syahnawi	(Indonesia) Marwan Faza (Indonesia) Felisha Pasaribu	15–21, 15–21	(silver) Runner-up	
2024 (I)	Indonesia International	(Indonesia) Adnan Maulana	(Indonesia) Jafar Hidayatullah (Indonesia) Felisha Pasaribu	18–21, 10–21	(silver) Runner-up	
2024	Malaysia International	(Indonesia) Adnan Maulana	(Indonesia) Amri Syahnawi (Indonesia) Nita Violina Marwah	24–22, 11–21, 19–21	(silver) Runner-up	

BWF International Challenge tournament
BWF International Series tournament

=== BWF Junior International (3 titles) ===
Mixed doubles
Year	Tournament	Partner	Opponent	Score	Result
2019	Indonesia Junior International	(Indonesia) Leo Rolly Carnando	(China) Feng Yanzhe (China) Lin Fangling	21–14, 21–19	(gold) Winner
2020	Dutch Junior International	(Indonesia) Teges Satriaji Cahyo Hutomo	(Malaysia) Muhammad Haikal (Malaysia) Low Yeen Yuan	21–17, 21–10	(gold) Winner
2020	German Junior	(Indonesia) Teges Satriaji Cahyo Hutomo	(South Korea) Lee Hak-joo (South Korea) Yoo A-yeon	6–21, 21–16, 21–10	(gold) Winner

BWF Junior International Grand Prix tournament
BWF Junior International Challenge tournament
BWF Junior International Series tournament
BWF Junior Future Series tournament

== Performance timeline ==
Key

W	Won	F	Finalist	SF	Semi-finalist
QF	Quarter-finalist	#R	Rounds 4, 3, 2, 1	RR	Round-robin stage
Q#	Qualification round	A	Absent	w/d	Withdrew
G	Gold	S	Silver	B	Bronze
NH	Not held	N/A	Not applicable	DNQ	Did not qualify

=== National team ===
- Junior level

Team events	2019
Asian Junior Championships	S
World Junior Championships	G

=== Individual competitions ===
==== Junior level ====
- Girls' doubles

Events	2018
Asian Junior Championships	QF

- Mixed doubles

Events	2018	2019
Asian Junior Championships	A	G
World Junior Championships	G	S

==== Senior level ====
===== Women's doubles =====
Tournament	BWF Superseries	BWF World Tour	Best
Tournament	2017	2018	Best
Indonesia Masters	NH	1R	1R ('18)
Indonesia Open	Q1	A	Q1 ('17)
Year-end ranking	881	171	169

===== Mixed doubles =====
Event	2025	2026	Ref
Asian Championships	A	1R	
World Championships	DNQ	Dec	

Tournament	BWF World Tour									Best	Ref
Tournament	2018	2019	2020	2021	2022	2023	2024	2025	2026	Best	Ref
Indonesia Masters	A							1R	QF	QF ('26)	
Thailand Masters	A			NH		A		QF	W	W ('26)	
German Open	A		NH		A			1R	A	1R ('25)	
Swiss Open	A		NH	A					QF	QF ('26)	
Orléans Masters	A		NH	A				QF	1R	QF ('25)	
Thailand Open	A			NH	A			QF	1R	QF ('25)	
Malaysia Masters	A			NH	A			1R	2R	2R ('26)	
Indonesia Open	A		NH	A				QF	2R	QF ('25)	
Australian Open	A		NH		A			2R	A	2R ('25)	
Macau Open	A		NH				A	QF	A	QF ('25)	
Taipei Open	A		NH		A			1R	A	1R ('25)	
China Masters	A		NH			A		1R	A	1R ('25)	
Indonesia Masters Super 100	1R	A	NH		2R	Q2	F	A	QF	F ('24^{I})	
Indonesia Masters Super 100	1R	A	NH		2R	1R	2R	A	2R	F ('24^{I})	
Vietnam Open	A		NH		A		W	A		W ('24)	
Denmark Open	A							2R	A	2R ('25)	
Malaysia Super 100	N/A					A			SF	SF ('26)	
French Open	A		NH	A				1R	A	1R ('25)	
Hylo Open	A							2R	A	2R ('25)	
Korea Open	A		NH		A			1R	1R	1R ('25, '26)	
Kaohsiung Masters	NH					A			2R	2R ('26)	
Hong Kong Open	A		NH			A		SF	A	SF ('25)	
Guwahati Masters	NH					1R	A			1R ('23)	
Odisha Masters	NH				A	1R	A			1R ('23)	
Akita Masters	A	QF	NH							QF ('19)	
Year-end ranking	183	150	140	193	107	136	73	25		17	
Tournament	2018	2019	2020	2021	2022	2023	2024	2025	2026	Best	Ref
