= 2019 BWF World Junior Championships – Mixed doubles =

2019 BWF World Junior Championships Mixed Doubles
Tournament details
- Dates: 7 – 13 October 2019
- Edition: 21st
- Level: International
- Venue: Kazan Gymnastics Center
- Location: Kazan, Russia

The mixed doubles of the tournament 2019 BWF World Junior Championships will be held from 7 to 13 October 2019. The defending champions were Leo Rolly Carnando/Indah Cahya Sari Jamil from Indonesia, but lost to Feng Yanzhe and Lin Fangling from China in the final.

== Seeds ==
Click on the seed number of a player to go to their draw section.

1. (Indonesia) Leo Rolly Carnando / Indah Cahya Sari Jamil (final)
2. (China) Feng Yanzhe / Lin Fangling (champions)
3. (Thailand) Ratchapol Makkasasithorn / Benyapa Aimsaard (semifinals)
4. (China) Jiang Zhenbang / Li Yijing (semifinals)
5. (Thailand) Sirawit Sothon / Pornnicha Suwatnodom (third round)
6. (Malaysia) Yap Roy King / Gan Jing Err (quarterfinals)
7. (England) Ethan van Leeuwen / Annie Lado (second round)
8. (England) Rory Easton / Hope Warner (fourth round)

9. (England) William Jones / Asmita Chaudhari (third round)
10. (Russia) Egor Kholkin / Mariia Sukhova (third round)
11. (Indonesia) Andre Timotius Tololiu / Dinda Dwi Cahyaning (second round)
12. (Japan) Tsubasa Kawamura / Kaho Osawa (third round)
13. (Germany) Aaron Sonnenschein / Leona Michalski (fourth round)
14. (Russia) Lev Barinov / Anastasiia Boairun (fourth round)
15. (France) Kenji Lovang / Juliette Moinard (fourth round)
16. (Denmark) Rasmus Espersen / Christine Busch (fourth round)

== Draw ==
=== Finals ===
Quarterfinals
1	(Indonesia) Leo Rolly Carnando (Indonesia) Indah Cahya Sari Jamil	22	21
(Hong Kong) Lui Chun Wai (Hong Kong) Leung Sze Lok	20	11
4	(China) Jiang Zhenbang (China) Li Yijing	22	18	23
(Japan) Kakeru Kumagai (Japan) Mizuki Otake	20	21	21
6	(Malaysia) Yap Roy King (Malaysia) Gan Jing Err	19	17
3	(Thailand) Ratchapol Makkasasithorn (Thailand) Benyapa Aimsaard	21	21
(Hong Kong) Ko Shing Hei (Hong Kong) Yeung Pui Lam	20	14
2	(China) Feng Yanzhe (China) Lin Fangling	22	21

Semifinals
1	(Indonesia) Leo Rolly Carnando (Indonesia) Indah Cahya Sari Jamil	23	12	21
4	(China) Jiang Zhenbang (China) Li Yijing	21	21	19
3	(Thailand) Ratchapol Makkasasithorn (Thailand) Benyapa Aimsaard	17	14
2	(China) Feng Yanzhe (China) Lin Fangling	21	21

Finals
1	(Indonesia) Leo Rolly Carnando (Indonesia) Indah Cahya Sari Jamil	17	17
2	(China) Feng Yanzhe (China) Lin Fangling	21	21

=== Top half ===
==== Section 1 ====
First Round
(South Korea) Jo S-m (South Korea) Kim Y-j	21	14	21
(Scotland) A Pringle (Scotland) R Andrew	19	21	19
(Italy) E Baroni (Italy) C Passeri	12	10
(India) I Bhatnagar (India) T Crasto	21	21
(United States) W Tsai (United States) T Xie	21	21
(Chinese Taipei) Wang P-w (Chinese Taipei) Yeo Y-c	19	16
(New Zealand) R Tong (New Zealand) C Rozario	12	13
(Australia) O Zhao (Australia) K Ea	21	21
(Singapore) A Yong (Singapore) J Koh	21	22
(Belarus) I Larushyn (Belarus) H Bandarenka	12	20
(China) Chen XJ (China) Zhang C	21	21
(Norway) A R Huus (Norway) M Mørk	2	15

Second Round
1	(Indonesia) L R Carnando (Indonesia) I C S Jamil	21	21
(South Korea) Jo S-m (South Korea) Kim Y-j	13	11
(India) I Bhatnagar (India) T Crasto	21	21
(United States) W Tsai (United States) T Xie	13	12
12	(Japan) T Kawamura (Japan) K Osawa	21	21
(Australia) O Zhao X D (Australia) K Ea	13	13
(Singapore) A Yong C S (Singapore) J Koh Y H	6	11
(China) Chen XJ (China) Zhang C	21	21

Third Round
1	(Indonesia) L R Carnando (Indonesia) I C S Jamil	20	21	21
(India) I Bhatnagar (India) T Crasto	22	16	17
12	(Japan) T Kawamura (Japan) K Osawa	21	12	16
(China) Chen XJ (China) Zhang C	19	21	21

Fourth Round
1	(Indonesia) L R Carnando (Indonesia) I C S Jamil	21	25
(China) Chen XJ (China) Zhang C	17	23

==== Section 2 ====
First Round
(Czech Republic) V Kulíšek (Czech Republic) L Krpatová	20	21	8
(France) Y Gaudin (France) F Vallet	22	12	21
(Sri Lanka) T T Palliyaguru (Sri Lanka) A Masakorala	14	16
(Denmark) M Rindshøj (Denmark) C Graversen	21	21
(Peru) M Novoa (Peru) I Mendoza	17	21	21
(Finland) T Lindelöf (Finland) J Salonen	21	15	16
10	(Russia) E Kholkin (Russia) M Sukhova	21	21
(Lithuania) D Berzanskis (Lithuania) S Golubickaite	9	6
(Switzerland) A Boudier (Switzerland) C Racloz	21	17	21
(Uganda) B Kasirye (Uganda) H Kobugabe	12	21	13
(Macau) Vong K W (Macau) Chio W U	8	11
(Hong Kong) Lui C W (Hong Kong) Leung S L	21	21
(Portugal) H Fernandes (Portugal) M Afonso	5	11
(Malaysia) Ching K F (Malaysia) Teoh L X	21	21

Second Round
7	(England) E van Leeuwen (England) A Lado	15	21	18
(France) Y Gaudin (France) F Vallet	21	13	21
(Denmark) M Rindshøj (Denmark) C Graversen	21	21
(Peru) M Novoa (Peru) I Mendoza	15	16
10	(Russia) E Kholkin (Russia) M Sukhova	21	23
(Switzerland) A Boudier (Switzerland) C Racloz	15	21
(Hong Kong) Lui C W (Hong Kong) Leung S L	21	21
(Malaysia) Ching K F (Malaysia) Teoh L X	17	15

Third Round
(France) Y Gaudin (France) F Vallet	11	12
(Denmark) M Rindshøj (Denmark) C Graversen	21	21
10	(Russia) E Kholkin (Russia) M Sukhova	11	21	10
(Hong Kong) Lui C W (Hong Kong) Leung S L	21	17	21

Fourth Round
(Denmark) M Rindshøj (Denmark) C Graversen	12	19
(Hong Kong) Lui C W (Hong Kong) Leung S L	21	21

==== Section 3 ====
First Round
(South Korea) Park S-m (South Korea) Jeong D-y	21	21
(Sri Lanka) L de Silva (Sri Lanka) P J Mudiyanselage	19	10
(Australia) R Tang (Australia) V He	11	16
(Chinese Taipei) Yu S-p (Chinese Taipei) Tung C-t	21	21
(Scotland) J Apiliga (Scotland) R Sugden	9	8
(India) S Karunakaran (India) R V Chickmenhalli	21	21
9	(England) W Jones (England) A Chaudhari	21	21
(Germany) M Datko (Germany) E Moszczynski	13	15
(Spain) A Leal (Spain) L Solis	19	19
(France) N Hoareau (France) L Jaffrennou	21	21
(Iceland) G Nilsson (Iceland) J K Johannsdottir	13	11
(New Zealand) J Wang (New Zealand) E Smith	21	21
(Malaysia) M Haikal (Malaysia) Low Y Y	21	21
(Finland) S Emran (Finland) T Vasikkaniemi	9	3

Second Round
4	(China) Jiang ZB (China) Li YJ	21	21
(South Korea) Park S-m (South Korea) Jeong D-y	13	6
(Chinese Taipei) Yu S-p (Chinese Taipei) Tung C-t	22	21
(India) S Karunakaran (India) R V Chickmenhalli	20	17
9	(England) W Jones (England) A Chaudhari	21	21
(France) N Hoareau (France) L Jaffrennou	16	15
(New Zealand) J Wang (New Zealand) E Smith	11	9
(Malaysia) M Haikal (Malaysia) Low Y Y	21	21

Third Round
4	(China) Jiang ZB (China) Li YJ	21	21
(Chinese Taipei) Yu S-p (Chinese Taipei) Tung C-t	10	18
9	(England) W Jones (England) A Chaudhari	15	17
(Malaysia) M Haikal (Malaysia) Low Y Y	21	21

Fourth Round
4	(China) Jiang ZB (China) Li YJ	22	19	21
(Malaysia) M Haikal (Malaysia) Low Y Y	20	21	14

==== Section 4 ====
First Round
(Canada) Chen YZ (Canada) C Choi	21	13	21
(Russia) E Velp (Russia) A Kurdyukova	17	21	18
(Slovakia) A Antoska (Slovakia) L Vojtekova	16	18
(Japan) K Kumagai (Japan) M Otake	21	21
(Sweden) G Bjorkler (Sweden) E Urell	21	25
(Switzerland) Y Orteu (Switzerland) J Franconville	11	23
16	(Denmark) R Espersen (Denmark) C Busch	21	21
(Hungary) G Szita (Hungary) F D Kiss	6	13
(Mongolia) Y-E Munkhbaatar (Mongolia) M Lkhagvasuren	8	3
(Norway) L Smith-Meyer (Norway) E P Norberg	21	21
(Latvia) M Ķirkums (Latvia) A Azarova	3	8
(Indonesia) M. L Apriyanda (Indonesia) H A Puspitasari	21	21
(Kazakhstan) A Shalagin (Kazakhstan) N Rakhmetullayeva	14	14
(Uzbekistan) B Kuchkarboev (Uzbekistan) G Bokieva	21	21

Second Round
5	(Thailand) S Sothon (Thailand) P Suwatnodom	21	21
(Canada) Chen YZ (Canada) C Choi	19	8
(Japan) K Kumagai (Japan) M Otake	21	21
(Sweden) G Bjorkler (Sweden) E Urell	7	15
16	(Denmark) R Espersen (Denmark) C Busch	21	21
(Norway) L Smith-Meyer (Norway) E P Norberg	9	11
(Indonesia) M. L Apriyanda (Indonesia) H A Puspitasari	21	21
(Uzbekistan) B Kuchkarboev (Uzbekistan) G Bokieva	11	6

Third Round
5	(Thailand) S Sothon (Thailand) P Suwatnodom	16	19
(Japan) K Kumagai (Japan) M Otake	21	21
16	(Denmark) R Espersen (Denmark) C Busch	21	21
(Indonesia) M. L Apriyanda (Indonesia) H A Puspitasari	19	19

Fourth Round
(Japan) K Kumagai (Japan) M Otake	21	21
16	(Denmark) R Espersen (Denmark) C Busch	18	19

=== Bottom half ===
==== Section 5 ====
First Round
(Uzbekistan) A Olimjanov (Uzbekistan) M Ganieva	6	7
(Hong Kong) Hung K C (Hong Kong) Tsang H Y	21	21
(Kazakhstan) V Zeiferling (Kazakhstan) V Li-Zhe-Yu	7	7
(Norway) J Østhassel (Norway) A Hong	21	21
(Greece) V R Kiosses (Greece) G Sotiriou	8	13
(Denmark) M Vestergaard (Denmark) N P. Anthonisen	21	21
(China) Liu DW (China) Yang JY	14	18
15	(France) K Lovang (France) J Moinard	21	21
(Sweden) J Hansson (Sweden) C Wang	21	21
(Finland) J Kuoppala (Finland) N Nokkala	16	17
(Macau) Leong I C (Macau) Wong C W	21	22
(Portugal) J Chang (Portugal) C Lourenço	19	20
(United States) S Kolla (United States) K Choi	22	16	21
(Sri Lanka) C Dias (Sri Lanka) D Dias	20	21	19

Second Round
(Hong Kong) Hung K C (Hong Kong) Tsang H Y	23	21	21
(Norway) J Østhassel (Norway) A Hong	25	16	14
(Denmark) M Vestergaard (Denmark) N P. Anthonisen	19	20
15	(France) K Lovang (France) J Moinard	21	22
(Sweden) J Hansson (Sweden) C Wang	21	21
(Macau) Leong I C (Macau) Wong C W	18	10
(United States) S Kolla (United States) K Choi	5	12
6	(Malaysia) Yap R K (Malaysia) Gan J E	21	21

Third Round
(Hong Kong) Hung K C (Hong Kong) Tsang H Y	17	21	14
15	(France) K Lovang (France) J Moinard	21	18	21
(Sweden) J Hansson (Sweden) C Wang	16	17
6	(Malaysia) Yap R K (Malaysia) Gan J E	21	21

Fourth Round
15	(France) K Lovang (France) J Moinard	21	14	17
6	(Malaysia) Yap R K (Malaysia) Gan J E	17	21	21

==== Section 6 ====
First Round
(New Zealand) E Lau (New Zealand) J Jiang	19	20
(South Korea) Heo T-y (South Korea) Seo B-h	21	22
(Latvia) A Zandovskis (Latvia) A Rulle-Titava	12	15
(Lithuania) J Petkus (Lithuania) G Mockute	21	21
(Canada) C Jia (Canada) J Cheung	21	21
(Estonia) A Ajupov (Estonia) R Üprus	10	13
(Belarus) H Shvydkou (Belarus) V Tarusava	14	7
14	(Russia) L Barinov (Russia) A Boairun	21	21
(Chinese Taipei) Chiang C-w (Chinese Taipei) Wang X-y	21	17	21
(Japan) T Shibata (Japan) R Hirokami	18	21	16
(Indonesia) D R Restu (Indonesia) M I Cindiani	21	21
(Czech Republic) T Švejda (Czech Republic) K Zuzáková	17	14
(Netherlands) W van der Aar (Netherlands) K van Buiten	21	21
(Armenia) A Vardanyan (Armenia) G Mamajanyan	10	15

Second Round
(South Korea) Heo T-y (South Korea) Seo B-h	21	21
(Lithuania) J Petkus (Lithuania) G Mockute	9	18
(Canada) C Jia (Canada) J Cheung	13	18
14	(Russia) L Barinov (Russia) A Boairun	21	21
(Chinese Taipei) Chiang C-w (Chinese Taipei) Wang X-y	12	16
(Indonesia) D R Restu (Indonesia) M I Cindiani	21	21
(Netherlands) W van der Aar (Netherlands) K van Buiten	12	14
3	(Thailand) R Makkasasithorn (Thailand) B Aimsaard	21	21

Third Round
(South Korea) Heo T-y (South Korea) Seo B-h	9	16
14	(Russia) L Barinov (Russia) A Boairun	21	21
(Indonesia) D R Restu (Indonesia) M I Cindiani	15	14
3	(Thailand) R Makkasasithorn (Thailand) B Aimsaard	21	21

Fourth Round
14	(Russia) L Barinov (Russia) A Boairun	8	12
3	(Thailand) R Makkasasithorn (Thailand) B Aimsaard	21	21

==== Section 7 ====
First Round
(Peru) B Roque (Peru) M Castillo	9	7
(Australia) J Yu (Australia) A Yu	21	21
(Japan) H Nishi (Japan) A Miyazaki	21	21
(Uganda) A M Vaheed (Uganda) T Naluwooza	3	8
(Hong Kong) Ko S H (Hong Kong) Yeung P L	21	21
(United States) A Mar (United States) E Han	18	11
(Canada) J Chien (Canada) C Lai	19	11
11	(Indonesia) A T Tololiu (Indonesia) D D Cahyaning	21	21
(Sweden) J Ekman (Sweden) J Silvennoinen	23	21
(Switzerland) Pham M Q (Switzerland) M Schnider	21	19
(Thailand) K Vitidsarn (Thailand) Y Chuencharoen	21	21
(Scotland) M McGuire (Scotland) A Campbell	16	15
(Israel) M Grinblat (Israel) D Danilenko	13	18
(Malaysia) A Junaidi (Malaysia) V Siow	21	21

Second Round
(Australia) J Yu (Australia) A Yu	20	7
(Japan) H Nishi (Japan) A Miyazaki	22	21
(Hong Kong) Ko S H (Hong Kong) Yeung P L	22	17	21
11	(Indonesia) A T Tololiu (Indonesia) D D Cahyaning	20	21	17
(Sweden) J Ekman (Sweden) J Silvennoinen	6	9
(Thailand) K Vitidsarn (Thailand) Y Chuencharoen	21	21
(Malaysia) A Junaidi (Malaysia) V Siow	20	18
8	(England) R Easton (England) H Warner	22	21

Third Round
(Japan) H Nishi (Japan) A Miyazaki	7	21	9
(Hong Kong) Ko S H (Hong Kong) Yeung P L	21	16	21
(Thailand) K Vitidsarn (Thailand) Y Chuencharoen	19	19
8	(England) R Easton (England) H Warner	21	21

Fourth Round
(Hong Kong) Ko S H (Hong Kong) Yeung P L	21	21
8	(England) R Easton (England) H Warner	9	11

==== Section 8 ====
First Round
(Uzbekistan) A Muminov (Uzbekistan) K Ollaberganova	18	9
(Iceland) B M Ellertsson (Iceland) K Prus	21	21
(Portugal) R Almeida (Portugal) M Neves	17	15
(Czech Republic) J Janoštík (Czech Republic) K Mikelová	21	21
(Mongolia) S Enkhbat (Mongolia) K Darkhanbaatar	17	23	14
(Kazakhstan) V Chernikov (Kazakhstan) D Moiseenko	21	21	21
(Denmark) W K Boe (Denmark) A C Kudsk	18	10
13	(Germany) A Sonnenschein (Germany) L Michalski	21	21
(Slovakia) J Horak (Slovakia) M Tarcalova	21	21
(Latvia) K Vārna (Latvia) D Stognija	9	8
(South Korea) An Y-s (South Korea) Lee N-r	21	12	18
(India) S P Udayakumar (India) N S Siraj	16	21	21
(Chinese Taipei) Cheng K-w (Chinese Taipei) Jiang P-y	21	21
(Belarus) A Aliaksandrovich (Belarus) A Vasileuskaya	8	12

Second Round
(Iceland) B M Ellertsson (Iceland) K Prus	10	11
(Czech Republic) J Janoštík (Czech Republic) K Mikelová	21	21
(Kazakhstan) V Chernikov (Kazakhstan) D Moiseenko	9	9
13	(Germany) A Sonnenschein (Germany) L Michalski	21	21
(Slovakia) J Horak (Slovakia) M Tarcalova	16	17
(India) S P Udayakumar (India) N S Siraj	21	21
(Chinese Taipei) Cheng K-w (Chinese Taipei) Jiang P-y	12	14
2	(China) Feng YZ (China) Lin FL	21	21

Third Round
(Czech Republic) J Janoštík (Czech Republic) K Mikelová	15	11
13	(Germany) A Sonnenschein (Germany) L Michalski	21	21
(India) S P Udayakumar (India) N S Siraj	9	4
2	(China) Feng YZ (China) Lin FL	21	21

Fourth Round
13	(Germany) A Sonnenschein (Germany) L Michalski	7	17
2	(China) Feng YZ (China) Lin FL	21	21
