= 2025 Thailand Open (badminton) =

2025 badminton tournament in Thailand

Tournament details
- Dates: 13–18 May
- Edition: 37th
- Level: Super 500
- Total prize money: US$475,000
- Venue: Nimibutr Stadium
- Location: Bangkok, Thailand

Champions
- Men's singles: (Thailand) Kunlavut Vitidsarn
- Women's singles: (China) Chen Yufei
- Men's doubles: (Malaysia) Aaron Chia (Malaysia) Soh Wooi Yik
- Women's doubles: (Malaysia) Pearly Tan (Malaysia) Thinaah Muralitharan
- Mixed doubles: (China) Feng Yanzhe (China) Huang Dongping

The 2025 Thailand Open (officially known as the Toyota Thailand Open 2025 for sponsorship reasons) was a badminton tournament held at the Nimibutr Stadium in Bangkok, Thailand, from 13 to 18 May 2025. The tournament had a total prize money of $475,000.

== Tournament ==
The 2025 Thailand Open was the eleventh tournament of the 2025 BWF World Tour and was part of the Thailand Open championships, which have been held since 1984. The tournament was organized by the Badminton Association of Thailand and was sanctioned by the BWF.

=== Venue ===
This international tournament was held at the Nimibutr Stadium in Bangkok, Thailand.

=== Points distribution ===
Below is the points distribution table for each phase of the tournament based on the BWF points system for the BWF World Tour Super 500 event.

Winner	Runner-up	3/4	5/8	9/16	17/32	33/64	65/128
9,200	7,800	6,420	5,040	3,600	2,220	880	430

=== Prize pool ===
The total prize money was US$475,000 and was distributed according to BWF regulations.

Event	Winner	Finalist	Semi-finals	Quarter-finals	Last 16
Singles	$35,625	$18,050	$6,887.50	$2,850	$1,662.50
Doubles	$37,525	$18,050	$6,650	$3,443.75	$1,781.25

== Men's singles ==
=== Seeds ===
1. (Thailand) Kunlavut Vitidsarn (champion)
2. (Denmark) Anders Antonsen (final)
3. (Chinese Taipei) Chou Tien-chen (second round)
4. (Japan) Kodai Naraoka (quarter-finals)
5. (Singapore) Loh Kean Yew (semi-finals)
6. (Japan) Kenta Nishimoto (quarter-finals)
7. (Chinese Taipei) Lee Chia-hao (first round)
8. (China) Lu Guangzu (semi-finals)

=== Finals ===
Semi-finals
1	(Thailand) Kunlavut Vitidsarn	21	21
5	(Singapore) Loh Kean Yew	10	12
8	(China) Lu Guangzu	21	13	16
2	(Denmark) Anders Antonsen	18	21	21

Final
1	(Thailand) Kunlavut Vitidsarn	21	17	21
2	(Denmark) Anders Antonsen	16	21	9

=== Top half ===
==== Section 1 ====
First round
1	(Thailand) K Vitidsarn	21	21
(China) Lei LX	19	10
PFQ	(Thailand) K Wangcharoen	15	18
(Hong Kong) Ng K L	21	21
6	(Japan) K Nishimoto	21	21
(Hong Kong) Lee C Y	17	17
(India) P Rajawat	13	21	16
(Indonesia) A Farhan	21	17	21

Second round
1	(Thailand) K Vitidsarn	13	21	24
(Hong Kong) Ng K L	21	18	22
6	(Japan) K Nishimoto	21	9	21
(Indonesia) A Farhan	15	21	13

Quarter-finals
1	(Thailand) K Vitidsarn	21	21
6	(Japan) K Nishimoto	16	18

==== Section 2 ====
First round
3	(Chinese Taipei) Chou T-c	21	21
(Japan) Y Tanaka	17	17
(Singapore) J Teh	9	21	17
(Denmark) R Gemke	21	8	21
5	(Singapore) Loh K Y	21	21
(Hong Kong) J Gunawan	15	12
(Republic of Ireland) N Nguyen	21	9	21
(India) L Sen	18	21	17

Second round
3	(Chinese Taipei) Chou T-c	21	16	13
(Denmark) R Gemke	15	21	21
5	(Singapore) Loh K Y	21	21
(Republic of Ireland) N Nguyen	15	6

Quarter-finals
(Denmark) R Gemke	21	12	11
5	(Singapore) Loh K Y	15	21	21

=== Bottom half ===
==== Section 3 ====
First round
(China) Wang ZX	12	21	18
Q1	(Malaysia) Aidil S	21	19	21
Q2	(Thailand) Pan Teeraratsakul	15	21	19
8	(China) Lu GZ	21	14	21
(Malaysia) Ng T Y	13	17
(China) Weng HY	21	21
PFQ	(Japan) T Obayashi	13	21	11
4	(Japan) K Naraoka	21	12	21

Second round
Q1	(Malaysia) Aidil S	21	16	14
8	(China) Lu GZ	18	21	21
(China) Weng HY	14	9
4	(Japan) K Naraoka	21	21

Quarter-finals
8	(China) Lu GZ	21	21
4	(Japan) K Naraoka	15	15

==== Section 4 ====
First round
(Chinese Taipei) Su L-y	21	14	21
(Chinese Taipei) Chi Y-j	18	21	14
(South Korea) Jeon H-j	21	21
7	(Chinese Taipei) Lee C-h	17	12
Q4	(India) T Mannepalli	21	21
Q3	(Malaysia) J Hoh	19	16
(Chinese Taipei) Wang T-w	21	17	10
2	(Denmark) A Antonsen	17	21	21

Second round
(Chinese Taipei) Su L-y	14	21	19
(South Korea) Jeon H-j	21	15	21
Q4	(India) T Mannepalli	14	16
2	(Denmark) A Antonsen	21	21

Quarter-finals
(South Korea) Jeon H-j	8	18
2	(Denmark) A Antonsen	21	21

== Women's singles ==
=== Seeds ===
1. (Thailand) Pornpawee Chochuwong (final)
2. (China) Chen Yufei (champion)
3. (Japan) Tomoka Miyazaki (semi-finals)
4. (Thailand) Supanida Katethong (semi-finals)
5. (Thailand) Busanan Ongbamrungphan (quarter-finals)
6. (Indonesia) Putri Kusuma Wardani (first round)
7. (Thailand) Ratchanok Intanon (quarter-finals)
8. (Singapore) Yeo Jia Min (quarter-finals)

=== Finals ===
Semi-finals
1	(Thailand) Pornpawee Chochuwong	21	21
4	(Thailand) Supanida Katethong	9	18
3	(Japan) Tomoka Miyazaki	11	21
2	(China) Chen Yufei	21	23

Final
1	(Thailand) Pornpawee Chochuwong	16	12
2	(China) Chen Yufei	21	21

=== Top half ===
==== Section 1 ====
First round
1	(Thailand) P Chochuwong	21	21
(Hong Kong) Lo S Y	8	8
PFQ	(India) U Hooda	21	18	23
Q1	(Thailand) T Nithiittikrai	14	21	21
8	(Singapore) Yeo J M	21	21
(India) R Ramraj	18	7
(Japan) H Akechi	19	19
Q3	(Thailand) P Opatniputh	21	21

Second round
1	(Thailand) P Chochuwong	21	21
PFQ	(India) U Hooda	14	11
8	(Singapore) Yeo J M	21	11
Q3	(Thailand) P Opatniputh	12	2^{r}

Quarter-finals
1	(Thailand) P Chochuwong	19	21	21
8	(Singapore) Yeo J M	21	15	9

==== Section 2 ====
First round
4	(Thailand) S Katethong	21	19	21
(Thailand) L Chaiwan	15	21	15
(India) A Kashyap	21	20	22
(Japan) K Sugiyama	16	22	20
5	(Thailand) B Ongbamrungphan	21	17	21
(Denmark) L Christophersen	14	21	16
Q2	(China) Han QX	21	21
(Chinese Taipei) Liang T-y	16	14

Second round
4	(Thailand) S Katethong	21	21
(India) A Kashyap	9	14
5	(Thailand) B Ongbamrungphan	18	21	21
Q2	(China) Han QX	21	16	11

Quarter-finals
4	(Thailand) S Katethong	14	21	21
5	(Thailand) B Ongbamrungphan	21	14	14

=== Bottom half ===
==== Section 3 ====
First round
(India) M Bansod	21	13	21
(Turkey) N Arın	12	21	17
(India) A Upadhyaya	11	9
7	(Thailand) R Intanon	21	21
(Chinese Taipei) Tung C-t	21	21
(Indonesia) K A C Dewi	15	19
(Chinese Taipei) Chiu P-c	18	9
3	(Japan) T Miyazaki	21	21

Second round
(India) M Bansod	12	16
7	(Thailand) R Intanon	21	21
(Chinese Taipei) Tung C-t	18	14
3	(Japan) T Miyazaki	21	21

Quarter-finals
7	(Thailand) R Intanon	16	16
3	(Japan) T Miyazaki	21	21

==== Section 4 ====
First round
(Japan) R Gunji	13	21	21
Q4	(Thailand) T Kleebyeesun	21	17	18
(Thailand) P Choeikeewong	21	21
6	(Indonesia) P K Wardani	15	14
(South Korea) Sim Y-j	12	21	21
(Chinese Taipei) Lin H-t	21	19	16
(Malaysia) Goh J W	6	9
2	(China) Chen YF	21	21

Second round
(Japan) R Gunji	12	18
(Thailand) P Choeikeewong	21	21
(South Korea) Sim Y-j	16	12
2	(China) Chen YF	21	21

Quarter-finals
(Thailand) P Choeikeewong	15	14
2	(China) Chen YF	21	21

== Men's doubles ==
=== Seeds ===
1. (Indonesia) Fajar Alfian / Muhammad Rian Ardianto (semi-finals)
2. (Malaysia) Aaron Chia / Soh Wooi Yik (champions)
3. (Malaysia) Man Wei Chong / Tee Kai Wun (second round)
4. (Indonesia) Sabar Karyaman Gutama / Muhammad Reza Pahlevi Isfahani (quarter-finals)
5. (Thailand) Kittinupong Kedren / Dechapol Puavaranukroh (semi-finals)
6. (Malaysia) Junaidi Arif / Yap Roy King (quarter-finals)
7. (Chinese Taipei) Liu Kuang-heng / Yang Po-han (quarter-finals)
8. (Chinese Taipei) Lee Fang-chih / Lee Fang-jen (quarter-finals)

=== Finals ===
Semi-finals
1	(Indonesia) Fajar Alfian (Indonesia) Muhammad Rian Ardianto	13	12
(Denmark) William Kryger Boe (Denmark) Christian Faust Kjær	21	21
5	(Thailand) Kittinupong Kedren (Thailand) Dechapol Puavaranukroh	17	13
2	(Malaysia) Aaron Chia (Malaysia) Soh Wooi Yik	21	21

Final
(Denmark) William Kryger Boe (Denmark) Christian Faust Kjær	22	17	12
2	(Malaysia) Aaron Chia (Malaysia) Soh Wooi Yik	20	21	21

=== Top half ===
==== Section 1 ====
First round
1	(Indonesia) F Alfian (Indonesia) M R Ardianto	21	21
(Malaysia) Low H Y (Malaysia) Ng E C	11	17
Q3	(Chinese Taipei) Lu C-y (Chinese Taipei) Wei C-w	21	21
(Japan) K Kumagai (Japan) H Nishi	17	19
7	(Chinese Taipei) Liu K-h (Chinese Taipei) Yang P-ha	21	21
(Japan) T Nomura (Japan) Y Shimogami	16	16
(South Korea) Kang M-h (South Korea) Ki D-j	21	21
(China) Sun WJ (China) Zhu YJ	14	11

Second round
1	(Indonesia) F Alfian (Indonesia) M R Ardianto	21	21	21
Q3	(Chinese Taipei) Lu C-y (Chinese Taipei) Wei C-w	23	19	15
7	(Chinese Taipei) Liu K-h (Chinese Taipei) Yang P-ha	21	21
(South Korea) Kang M-h (South Korea) Ki D-j	8	19

Quarter-finals
1	(Indonesia) F Alfian (Indonesia) M R Ardianto	21	21
7	(Chinese Taipei) Liu K-h (Chinese Taipei) Yang P-ha	18	17

==== Section 2 ====
First round
3	(Malaysia) Man W C (Malaysia) Tee K W	21	21
(Malaysia) Choong H J (Malaysia) M Haikal	10	11
(Thailand) C Charoenkitamorn (Thailand) W Thongsa-nga	16	15
(Denmark) W K Boe (Denmark) C F Kjær	21	21
8	(Chinese Taipei) Lee F-c (Chinese Taipei) Lee F-j	21	21
(Chinese Taipei) Chiang C-w (Chinese Taipei) Wu H-y	12	17
(Chinese Taipei) Chen Z-r (Chinese Taipei) Lin Y-c	15	15
Q4	(South Korea) Choi S-g (Malaysia) Goh V S	21	21

Second round
3	(Malaysia) Man W C (Malaysia) Tee K W	21	19	18
(Denmark) W K Boe (Denmark) C F Kjær	15	21	21
8	(Chinese Taipei) Lee F-c (Chinese Taipei) Lee F-j	22	21
Q4	(South Korea) Choi S-g (Malaysia) Goh V S	20	11

Quarter-finals
(Denmark) W K Boe (Denmark) C F Kjær	21	21
8	(Chinese Taipei) Lee F-c (Chinese Taipei) Lee F-j	18	14

=== Bottom half ===
==== Section 3 ====
First round
(South Korea) Jin Y (South Korea) Na S-s	21	15	21
(Malaysia) N M Azriyn A (Malaysia) Tan W K	16	21	16
(Thailand) P Sukphun (Thailand) Pak Teeraratsakul	7^{r}
5	(Thailand) K Kedren (Thailand) D Puavaranukroh	11
(Chinese Taipei) Chang K-c (Chinese Taipei) Po L-w	18	21	21
Q2	(Thailand) T Madee (Thailand) W Sothon	21	18	12
(China) Huang D (China) Liu Y	22	15
4	(Indonesia) S K Gutama (Indonesia) M R P Isfahani	24	21

Second round
(South Korea) Jin Y (South Korea) Na S-s	16	16
5	(Thailand) K Kedren (Thailand) D Puavaranukroh	21	21
(Chinese Taipei) Chang K-c (Chinese Taipei) Po L-w	15	21	15
4	(Indonesia) S K Gutama (Indonesia) M R P Isfahani	21	17	21

Quarter-finals
5	(Thailand) K Kedren (Thailand) D Puavaranukroh	21	21
4	(Indonesia) S K Gutama (Indonesia) M R P Isfahani	18	13

==== Section 4 ====
First round
(Malaysia) Kang K X (Malaysia) A Tai	12	21	21
Q1	(Thailand) P Kaosamaang (Thailand) T Punpanich	21	13	15
(India) P Roy (India) K S Pratheek	20	21	18
6	(Malaysia) J Arif (Malaysia) Yap R K	22	17	21
(Chinese Taipei) Lu M-c (Chinese Taipei) Tang K-w	11	13
(Japan) H Midorikawa (Japan) K Yamashita	21	21
(France) J Maio (France) W Villeger	24	19	15
2	(Malaysia) A Chia (Malaysia) Soh W Y	22	21	21

Second round
(Malaysia) Kang K X (Malaysia) A Tai	11	11
6	(Malaysia) J Arif (Malaysia) Yap R K	21	21
(Japan) H Midorikawa (Japan) K Yamashita	17	17
2	(Malaysia) A Chia (Malaysia) Soh W Y	21	21

Quarter-finals
6	(Malaysia) J Arif (Malaysia) Yap R K	12	13
2	(Malaysia) A Chia (Malaysia) Soh W Y	21	21

== Women's doubles ==
=== Seeds ===
1. (Malaysia) Pearly Tan / Thinaah Muralitharan (champions)
2. (Indonesia) Febriana Dwipuji Kusuma / Amallia Cahaya Pratiwi (quarter-finals)
3. (India) Treesa Jolly / Gayatri Gopichand (second round)
4. (Thailand) Laksika Kanlaha / Phataimas Muenwong (first round)
5. (Chinese Taipei) Chang Ching-hui / Yang Ching-tun (first round)
6. (Chinese Taipei) Hsu Yin-hui / Lin Jhih-yun (quarter-finals)
7. (Thailand) Benyapa Aimsaard / Nuntakarn Aimsaard (second round)
8. (Malaysia) Go Pei Kee / Teoh Mei Xing (second round)

=== Finals ===
Semi-finals
1	(Malaysia) Pearly Tan (Malaysia) Thinaah Muralitharan	21	21
Q2	(Japan) Rui Hirokami (Japan) Sayaka Hobara	18	12
(Chinese Taipei) Hsu Ya-ching (Chinese Taipei) Sung Yu-hsuan	17	19
(South Korea) Jeong Na-eun (South Korea) Lee Yeon-woo	21	21

Final
1	(Malaysia) Pearly Tan (Malaysia) Thinaah Muralitharan	21	21
(South Korea) Jeong Na-eun (South Korea) Lee Yeon-woo	16	17

=== Top half ===
==== Section 1 ====
First round
1	(Malaysia) P Tan (Malaysia) Thinaah M	21	21
PFQ	(India) R Ganesh (India) S Sikkandar	11	5
(Indonesia) L T Mayasari (Indonesia) S F S Ramadhanti	21	21
(Thailand) T Kleebyeesun (Thailand) N Laisuan	11	14
7	(Thailand) B Aimsaard (Thailand) N Aimsaard	21	21
(India) K Selvam (India) S Singhi	17	17
(China) Chen QC (China) Wang TG	16	21	21
(Chinese Taipei) Chen Y-f (Chinese Taipei) Sun L-c	21	13	12

Second round
1	(Malaysia) P Tan (Malaysia) Thinaah M	21	10	21
(Indonesia) L T Mayasari (Indonesia) S F S Ramadhanti	17	21	15
7	(Thailand) B Aimsaard (Thailand) N Aimsaard	18	20
(China) Chen QC (China) Wang TG	21	22

Quarter-finals
1	(Malaysia) P Tan (Malaysia) Thinaah M	21	21
(China) Chen QC (China) Wang TG	14	11

==== Section 2 ====
First round
3	(India) T Jolly (India) G Gopichand	21	21
(Malaysia) Ong X Y (Malaysia) C Ting	15	13
Q2	(Japan) R Hirokami (Japan) S Hobara	21	21
(Japan) M Otake (Japan) M Takahashi	13	10
8	(Malaysia) Go P K (Malaysia) Teoh M X	21	18	21
(Chinese Taipei) Chen S-y (Chinese Taipei) Hsieh Y-e	15	21	15
(Indonesia) M T Puspita Sari (Indonesia) R A Rose	24	21
(Indonesia) A Rahayu (Indonesia) F Setianingrum	22	18

Second round
3	(India) T Jolly (India) G Gopichand	20	14
Q2	(Japan) R Hirokami (Japan) S Hobara	22	21
8	(Malaysia) Go P K (Malaysia) Teoh M X	18	7
(Indonesia) M T Puspita Sari (Indonesia) R A Rose	21	21

Quarter-finals
Q2	(Japan) R Hirokami (Japan) S Hobara	21	21
(Indonesia) M T Puspita Sari (Indonesia) R A Rose	9	16

=== Bottom half ===
==== Section 3 ====
First round
(Thailand) O Jongsathapornparn (Thailand) S Suwachai	21	21
(Canada) J Dent (Canada) C Lai	11	15
(Thailand) A Povanon (Thailand) P Srisawat	11	13
6	(Chinese Taipei) Hsu Y-h (Chinese Taipei) Lin J-y	21	21
Q3	(China) Keng SL (China) Li HZ	21	10	18
(Chinese Taipei) Hsu Y-c (Chinese Taipei) Sung Y-h	19	21	21
(Hong Kong) Fan K Y (Hong Kong) Yau M Y	23	21
4	(Thailand) L Kanlaha (Thailand) P Muenwong	21	15

Second round
(Thailand) O Jongsathapornparn (Thailand) S Suwachai	7	11
6	(Chinese Taipei) Hsu Y-h (Chinese Taipei) Lin J-y	21	21
(Chinese Taipei) Hsu Y-c (Chinese Taipei) Sung Y-h	21	20	21
(Hong Kong) Fan K Y (Hong Kong) Yau M Y	14	22	8

Quarter-finals
6	(Chinese Taipei) Hsu Y-h (Chinese Taipei) Lin J-y	19	18
(Chinese Taipei) Hsu Y-c (Chinese Taipei) Sung Y-h	21	21

==== Section 4 ====
First round
Q4	(Thailand) P Phatcharaphisutsin (Thailand) N Sukklad	10	10
(South Korea) Jeong N-e (South Korea) Lee Y-w	21	21
(Hong Kong) Lui L L (Hong Kong) Tsang H Y	22	16	21
5	(Chinese Taipei) Chang C-h (Chinese Taipei) Yang C-t	20	21	15
(Canada) J Cheung (Canada) C Choi	22	20	22
Q1	(Thailand) C Chartweerachaisri (Thailand) P-O Phannachet	20	22	20
(Thailand) K Chaichana (Thailand) P Polyiam	16	10
2	(Indonesia) F D Kusuma (Indonesia) A C Pratiwi	21	21

Second round
(South Korea) Jeong N-e (South Korea) Lee Y-w	21	21
(Hong Kong) Lui L L (Hong Kong) Tsang H Y	17	14
(Canada) J Cheung (Canada) C Choi	11	11
2	(Indonesia) F D Kusuma (Indonesia) A C Pratiwi	21	21

Quarter-finals
(South Korea) Jeong N-e (South Korea) Lee Y-w	21	21
2	(Indonesia) F D Kusuma (Indonesia) A C Pratiwi	13	8

== Mixed doubles ==
=== Seeds ===
1. (China) Jiang Zhenbang / Wei Yaxin (first round)
2. (China) Feng Yanzhe / Huang Dongping (champions)
3. (Hong Kong) Tang Chun Man / Tse Ying Suet (semi-finals)
4. (China) Guo Xinwa / Chen Fanghui (second round)
5. (Japan) Hiroki Midorikawa / Natsu Saito (second round)
6. (Thailand) Dechapol Puavaranukroh / Supissara Paewsampran (quarter-finals)
7. (Malaysia) Hoo Pang Ron / Cheng Su Yin (first round)
8. (Thailand) Ruttanapak Oupthong / Jhenicha Sudjaipraparat (first round)

=== Finals ===
Semi-finals
(China) Gao Jiaxuan (China) Wu Mengying	21	21
3	(Hong Kong) Tang Chun Man (Hong Kong) Tse Ying Suet	6	14
(Indonesia) Amri Syahnawi (Indonesia) Nita Violina Marwah	18	13
2	(China) Feng Yanzhe (China) Huang Dongping	21	21

Final
(China) Gao Jiaxuan (China) Wu Mengying	22	16
2	(China) Feng Yanzhe (China) Huang Dongping	24	21

=== Top half ===
==== Section 1 ====
First round
1	(China) Jiang ZB (China) Wei YX	20	20
(Indonesia) A Maulana (Indonesia) I C S Jamil	22	22
(Chinese Taipei) Liu K-h (Chinese Taipei) Jheng Y-c	17	21	12
(Indonesia) M Faza (Indonesia) A S P Pranata	21	9	21
7	(Malaysia) Hoo P R (Malaysia) Cheng S Y	21	18	17
Q4	(Thailand) S Jomkoh (Thailand) O Jongsathapornparn	15	21	21
(Singapore) T Hee (Singapore) Jin YJ	21	16	11
(China) Gao JX (China) Wu MY	13	21	21

Second round
(Indonesia) A Maulana (Indonesia) I C S Jamil	21	21
(Indonesia) M Faza (Indonesia) A S P Pranata	19	13
Q4	(Thailand) S Jomkoh (Thailand) O Jongsathapornparn	7	12
(China) Gao JX (China) Wu MY	21	21

Quarter-finals
(Indonesia) A Maulana (Indonesia) I C S Jamil	13	15
(China) Gao JX (China) Wu MY	21	21

==== Section 2 ====
First round
3	(Hong Kong) Tang C M (Hong Kong) Tse Y S	21	21
(Thailand) Pak Teeraratsakul (Thailand) P Muenwong	14	17
(China) Zhu YJ (China) Zhang C	21	21
(Japan) Y Shimogami (Japan) S Hobara	15	12
6	(Thailand) D Puavaranukroh (Thailand) S Paewsampran	23	21
(Indonesia) D Ferdinansyah (Indonesia) S F S Ramadhanti	21	13
(Indonesia) J Hidayatullah (Indonesia) F Pasaribu	21	21
(France) J Maio (France) L Palermo	19	16

Second round
3	(Hong Kong) Tang C M (Hong Kong) Tse Y S	23	21
(China) Zhu YJ (China) Zhang C	21	15
6	(Thailand) D Puavaranukroh (Thailand) S Paewsampran	21	21
(Indonesia) J Hidayatullah (Indonesia) F Pasaribu	13	14

Quarter-finals
3	(Hong Kong) Tang C M (Hong Kong) Tse Y S	11	21	21
6	(Thailand) D Puavaranukroh (Thailand) S Paewsampran	21	14	10

=== Bottom half ===
==== Section 3 ====
First round
(Thailand) P Horbanluekit (Thailand) S Taerattanachai	21	22
(Malaysia) Wong T C (Malaysia) Lim C S	17	20
Q1	(Thailand) R Makkasasithorn (Thailand) R Laisuan	21	15	21
8	(Thailand) R Oupthong (Thailand) J Sudjaipraparat	17	21	13
(Indonesia) A Syahnawi (Indonesia) N V Marwah	24	20	21
(Japan) H Nishi (Japan) A Sato	22	22	18
Q2	(Indonesia) B Setiabudi (Indonesia) M D Oktavianti	14	12
4	(China) Guo XW (China) Chen FH	21	21

Second round
(Thailand) P Horbanluekit (Thailand) S Taerattanachai	21	21
Q1	(Thailand) R Makkasasithorn (Thailand) R Laisuan	13	8
(Indonesia) A Syahnawi (Indonesia) N V Marwah	19	21	21
4	(China) Guo XW (China) Chen FH	21	14	19

Quarter-finals
(Thailand) P Horbanluekit (Thailand) S Taerattanachai	12	9
(Indonesia) A Syahnawi (Indonesia) N V Marwah	21	21

==== Section 4 ====
First round
(Malaysia) Yap R K (Malaysia) V Siow	18	17
Q3	(South Korea) Ki D-j (South Korea) Jeong N-e	21	21
(Indonesia) V Y Mulia (Indonesia) L A Kusumawati	11	15
5	(Japan) H Midorikawa (Japan) N Saito	21	21
(Hong Kong) Lui C W (Hong Kong) Fu C Y	22	21
(Chinese Taipei) Po L-w (Chinese Taipei) Chang C-h	24	23
(Chinese Taipei) Ye H-w (Chinese Taipei) N G Chan	7	22
2	(China) Feng YZ (China) Huang DP	21	24

Second round
Q3	(South Korea) Ki D-j (South Korea) Jeong N-e	21	12	21
5	(Japan) H Midorikawa (Japan) N Saito	15	21	13
(Chinese Taipei) Po L-w (Chinese Taipei) Chang C-h	15	9
2	(China) Feng YZ (China) Huang DP	21	21

Quarter-finals
Q3	(South Korea) Ki D-j (South Korea) Jeong N-e	21	21	13
2	(China) Feng YZ (China) Huang DP	19	23	21

Preceded by 2025 Taipei Open	BWF World Tour; 2025 BWF season	Succeeded by 2025 Malaysia Masters
