= 2024 BWF World Tour =

Tournament details
- Dates: 9 January – 15 December
- Edition: 7th

The 2024 BWF World Tour (officially known as 2024 HSBC BWF World Tour for sponsorship reasons), was the seventh season of the BWF World Tour of badminton, a circuit of 31 tournaments that lead up to the World Tour Finals tournament. The 32 tournaments are divided into five levels: Level 1 is the said World Tour Finals, Level 2 called Super 1000 (4 tournaments), Level 3 called Super 750 (6 tournaments), Level 4 called Super 500 (9 tournaments) and Level 5 called Super 300 (12 tournaments). Each of these tournaments offers different ranking points and prize money. The highest points and prize pool are offered at the Super 1000 level (including the World Tour Finals).

One other category of the tournament, the BWF Tour Super 100 (level 6), also offers BWF World Tour ranking points. It still acts as an important part of the pathway and entry point for players into the BWF Tour tournaments. BWF announced that there will be 10 tournaments for the BWF Tour Super 100 in 2024. When the ten Level 6 grade tournaments of the BWF Tour Super 100 were included, the complete tour consisted of 42 tournaments, but one Super 300 and one Super 100 tournament were cancelled.

== Results ==
Below is the schedule released by the Badminton World Federation:

== Key ==
World Tour Finals
Super 1000 (4)
Super 750 (6)
Super 500 (9)
Super 300 (12)
Super 100 (10)

== Winners ==
Tour	Report	Men's singles	Women's singles	Men's doubles	Women's doubles	Mixed doubles
World Tour Finals
BWF World Tour Finals	Report	(China) Shi Yuqi	(China) Wang Zhiyi	(Denmark) Kim Astrup (Denmark) Anders Skaarup Rasmussen	(South Korea) Baek Ha-na (South Korea) Lee So-hee	(China) Zheng Siwei (China) Huang Yaqiong
Super 1000
Malaysia Open	Report	(Denmark) Anders Antonsen	(South Korea) An Se-young	(China) Liang Weikeng (China) Wang Chang	(China) Liu Shengshu (China) Tan Ning	(Japan) Yuta Watanabe (Japan) Arisa Higashino
All England Open	Report	(Indonesia) Jonatan Christie	(Spain) Carolina Marín	(Indonesia) Fajar Alfian (Indonesia) Muhammad Rian Ardianto	(South Korea) Baek Ha-na (South Korea) Lee So-hee	(China) Zheng Siwei (China) Huang Yaqiong
Indonesia Open	Report	(China) Shi Yuqi	(China) Chen Yufei	(China) Liang Weikeng (China) Wang Chang	(South Korea) Baek Ha-na (South Korea) Lee So-hee	(China) Jiang Zhenbang (China) Wei Yaxin
China Open	Report	(China) Weng Hongyang	(China) Wang Zhiyi	(Malaysia) Goh Sze Fei (Malaysia) Nur Izzuddin	(China) Li Yijing (China) Luo Xumin	(China) Feng Yanzhe (China) Huang Dongping
Super 750
India Open	Report	(China) Shi Yuqi	(Chinese Taipei) Tai Tzu-ying	(South Korea) Kang Min-hyuk (South Korea) Seo Seung-jae	(Japan) Mayu Matsumoto (Japan) Wakana Nagahara	(Thailand) Dechapol Puavaranukroh (Thailand) Sapsiree Taerattanachai
French Open	Report	(China) Shi Yuqi	(South Korea) An Se-young	(India) Satwiksairaj Rankireddy (India) Chirag Shetty	(China) Chen Qingchen (China) Jia Yifan	(China) Feng Yanzhe (China) Huang Dongping
Singapore Open	Report	(China) Shi Yuqi	(South Korea) An Se-young	(China) He Jiting (China) Ren Xiangyu	(China) Chen Qingchen (China) Jia Yifan	(China) Zheng Siwei (China) Huang Yaqiong
Japan Open	Report	(France) Alex Lanier	(Japan) Akane Yamaguchi	(Malaysia) Goh Sze Fei (Malaysia) Nur Izzudin	(China) Liu Shengshu (China) Tan Ning	(China) Jiang Zhenbang (China) Wei Yaxin
Denmark Open	Report	(Denmark) Anders Antonsen	(China) Wang Zhiyi	(China) Liang Weikeng (China) Wang Chang	(Japan) Rin Iwanaga (Japan) Kie Nakanishi	(China) Feng Yanzhe (China) Huang Dongping
China Masters	Report	(Denmark) Anders Antonsen	(South Korea) An Se-young	(South Korea) Jin Yong (South Korea) Seo Seung-jae	(China) Liu Shengshu (China) Tan Ning	(China) Feng Yanzhe (China) Huang Dongping
Super 500
Indonesia Masters	Report	(Denmark) Anders Antonsen	(China) Wang Zhiyi	(Indonesia) Leo Rolly Carnando (Indonesia) Daniel Marthin	(China) Liu Shengshu (China) Tan Ning	(China) Zheng Siwei (China) Huang Yaqiong
Thailand Open	Report	(Malaysia) Lee Zii Jia	(Thailand) Supanida Katethong	(India) Satwiksairaj Rankireddy (India) Chirag Shetty	(Thailand) Jongkolphan Kititharakul (Thailand) Rawinda Prajongjai	(China) Guo Xinwa (China) Chen Fanghui
Malaysia Masters	Report	(Denmark) Viktor Axelsen	(China) Wang Zhiyi	(Denmark) Kim Astrup (Denmark) Anders Skaarup Rasmussen	(Japan) Rin Iwanaga (Japan) Kie Nakanishi	(Malaysia) Goh Soon Huat (Malaysia) Shevon Jemie Lai
Australian Open	Report	(Malaysia) Lee Zii Jia	(Japan) Aya Ohori	(China) He Jiting (China) Ren Xiangyu	(Indonesia) Febriana Dwipuji Kusuma (Indonesia) Amalia Cahaya Pratiwi	(China) Jiang Zhenbang (China) Wei Yaxin
Canada Open	Report	(Japan) Koki Watanabe	(Thailand) Busanan Ongbamrungphan	(Denmark) Kim Astrup (Denmark) Anders Skaarup Rasmussen	(Japan) Rin Iwanaga (Japan) Kie Nakanishi	(Denmark) Jesper Toft (Denmark) Amalie Magelund
Korea Open	Report	(China) Lu Guangzu	(South Korea) Kim Ga-eun	(Indonesia) Leo Rolly Carnando (Indonesia) Bagas Maulana	(South Korea) Jeong Na-eun (South Korea) Kim Hye-jeong	(Malaysia) Chen Tang Jie (Malaysia) Toh Ee Wei
Hong Kong Open	Report	(Denmark) Viktor Axelsen	(China) Han Yue	(South Korea) Kang Min-hyuk (South Korea) Seo Seung-jae	(Malaysia) Pearly Tan (Malaysia) Thinaah Muralitharan	(China) Jiang Zhenbang (China) Wei Yaxin
Arctic Open	Report	(Chinese Taipei) Chou Tien-chen	(China) Han Yue	(Malaysia) Goh Sze Fei (Malaysia) Nur Izzuddin	(China) Liu Shengshu (China) Tan Ning	(China) Feng Yanzhe (China) Huang Dongping
Japan Masters	Report	(China) Li Shifeng	(Japan) Akane Yamaguchi	(Indonesia) Fajar Alfian (Indonesia) Muhammad Rian Ardianto	(China) Liu Shengshu (China) Tan Ning	(Thailand) Dechapol Puavaranukroh (Thailand) Supissara Paewsampran
Super 300
Thailand Masters	Report	(Chinese Taipei) Chou Tien-chen	(Japan) Aya Ohori	(China) He Jiting (China) Ren Xiangyu	(Thailand) Benyapa Aimsaard (Thailand) Nuntakarn Aimsaard	(Thailand) Dechapol Puavaranukroh (Thailand) Sapsiree Taerattanachai
German Open	Report	(France) Christo Popov	(Denmark) Mia Blichfeldt	(Chinese Taipei) Lee Jhe-huei (Chinese Taipei) Yang Po-hsuan	(China) Li Yijing (China) Luo Xumin	(Hong Kong) Tang Chun Man (Hong Kong) Tse Ying Suet
Orléans Masters	Report	(Japan) Yushi Tanaka	(Japan) Tomoka Miyazaki	(Malaysia) Choong Hon Jian (Malaysia) Muhammad Haikal	(Indonesia) Meilysa Trias Puspita Sari (Indonesia) Rachel Allessya Rose	(China) Cheng Xing (China) Zhang Chi
Swiss Open	Report	(Chinese Taipei) Lin Chun-yi	(Spain) Carolina Marín	(England) Ben Lane (England) Sean Vendy	(Indonesia) Lanny Tria Mayasari (Indonesia) Ribka Sugiarto	(Malaysia) Goh Soon Huat (Malaysia) Shevon Jemie Lai
Spain Masters	Report	(Singapore) Loh Kean Yew	(Thailand) Ratchanok Intanon	(Indonesia) Sabar Karyaman Gutama (Indonesia) Muhammad Reza Pahlevi Isfahani	(Japan) Rin Iwanaga (Japan) Kie Nakanishi	(Indonesia) Rinov Rivaldy (Indonesia) Pitha Haningtyas Mentari
New Zealand Open	Report	Cancelled				
U.S. Open	Report	(Japan) Yushi Tanaka	(Japan) Natsuki Nidaira	(Thailand) Peeratchai Sukphun (Thailand) Pakkapon Teeraratsakul	(Japan) Rin Iwanaga (Japan) Kie Nakanishi	(Thailand) Pakkapon Teeraratsakul (Thailand) Phataimas Muenwong
Taipei Open	Report	(Chinese Taipei) Lin Chun-yi	(South Korea) Sim Yu-jin	(Chinese Taipei) Lee Jhe-huei (Chinese Taipei) Yang Po-hsuan	(Indonesia) Febriana Dwipuji Kusuma (Indonesia) Amalia Cahaya Pratiwi	(Thailand) Pakkapon Teeraratsakul (Thailand) Phataimas Muenwong
Macau Open	Report	(Hong Kong) Ng Ka Long	(China) Gao Fangjie	(China) Chen Xujun (China) Liu Yi	(China) Li Wenmei (China) Zhang Shuxian	(China) Guo Xinwa (China) Chen Fanghui
Hylo Open	Report	(France) Christo Popov	(Denmark) Mia Blichfeldt	(England) Ben Lane (England) Sean Vendy	(Chinese Taipei) Sung Shuo-yun (Chinese Taipei) Yu Chien-hui	(Denmark) Jesper Toft (Denmark) Amalie Magelund
Korea Masters	Report	(Thailand) Kunlavut Vitidsarn	(Indonesia) Putri Kusuma Wardani	(Malaysia) Aaron Chia (Malaysia) Soh Wooi Yik	(South Korea) Kim Hye-jeong (South Korea) Kong Hee-yong	(China) Guo Xinwa (China) Chen Fanghui
Syed Modi International	Report	(India) Lakshya Sen	(India) P. V. Sindhu	(China) Huang Di (China) Liu Yang	(India) Treesa Jolly (India) Gayatri Gopichand	(Thailand) Dechapol Puavaranukroh (Thailand) Supissara Paewsampran
Super 100
Ruichang China Masters	Report	(China) Wang Zhengxing	(Japan) Kaoru Sugiyama	(China) Tan Qiang (China) Zhou Haodong	(Thailand) Laksika Kanlaha (Thailand) Phataimas Muenwong	(China) Zhou Zhihong (China) Yang Jiayi
Kaohsiung Masters	Report	(Chinese Taipei) Lee Chia-hao	(Chinese Taipei) Hsu Wen-chi	(Chinese Taipei) Chang Ko-chi (Chinese Taipei) Chen Xin-yuan	(Indonesia) Jesita Putri Miantoro (Indonesia) Febi Setianingrum	(Thailand) Ruttanapak Oupthong (Thailand) Jhenicha Sudjaipraparat
Baoji China Masters	Report	(China) Hu Zhean	(China) Han Qianxi	(China) Huang Di (China) Liu Yang	(China) Chen Xiaofei (China) Feng Xueying	(China) Zhang Hanyu (China) Bao Lijing
Indonesia Masters Super 100 I	Report	(Indonesia) Zaki Ubaidillah	(Japan) Riko Gunji	(Thailand) Chaloempon Charoenkitamorn (Thailand) Worrapol Thongsa-nga	(Indonesia) Jesita Putri Miantoro (Indonesia) Febi Setianingrum	(Indonesia) Jafar Hidayatullah (Indonesia) Felisha Pasaribu
Vietnam Open	Report	(Japan) Shogo Ogawa	(Vietnam) Nguyễn Thùy Linh	(Chinese Taipei) He Zhi-wei (Chinese Taipei) Huang Jui-hsuan	(Japan) Mizuki Otake (Japan) Miyu Takahashi	(Indonesia) Adnan Maulana (Indonesia) Indah Cahya Sari Jamil
Abu Dhabi Masters	Report	Cancelled				
Malaysia Super 100	Report	(Chinese Taipei) Chi Yu-jen	(Japan) Kaoru Sugiyama	(Malaysia) Low Hang Yee (Malaysia) Ng Eng Cheong	(Malaysia) Go Pei Kee (Malaysia) Teoh Mei Xing	(Chinese Taipei) Ye Hong-wei (Chinese Taipei) Nicole Gonzales Chan
Indonesia Masters Super 100 II	Report	(Indonesia) Alwi Farhan	(Indonesia) Ni Kadek Dhinda Amartya Pratiwi	(Indonesia) Rahmat Hidayat (Indonesia) Yeremia Rambitan	(Chinese Taipei) Hsieh Pei-shan (Chinese Taipei) Hung En-tzu	(Indonesia) Amri Syahnawi (Indonesia) Nita Violina Marwah
Guwahati Masters	Report	(India) Sathish Karunakaran	(China) Cai Yanyan	(Malaysia) Chia Wei Jie (Malaysia) Lwi Sheng Hao	(India) Tanisha Crasto (India) Ashwini Ponnappa	(China) Zhang Hanyu (China) Bao Lijing
Odisha Masters	Report	(India) Rithvik Sanjeevi	(China) Cai Yanyan	(China) Huang Di (China) Liu Yang	(Japan) Nanako Hara (Japan) Riko Kiyose	(China) Gao Jiaxuan (China) Tang Ruizhi

== Finals ==
This is the complete schedule of events on the 2024 calendar, with the champions and runners-up documented.

=== January ===
Date	Tournament	Champions	Runners-up
9–14 January	Malaysia Open (Draw): Host: Kuala Lumpur, Malaysia; Venue: Axiata Arena; Level: Super 1000; Prize: $1,300,000; Format: 32MS/32WS/32MD/32WD/32XD	(Denmark) Anders Antonsen	(China) Shi Yuqi
9–14 January	Malaysia Open (Draw): Host: Kuala Lumpur, Malaysia; Venue: Axiata Arena; Level: Super 1000; Prize: $1,300,000; Format: 32MS/32WS/32MD/32WD/32XD	Score: 21–14, 21–13	
9–14 January	Malaysia Open (Draw): Host: Kuala Lumpur, Malaysia; Venue: Axiata Arena; Level: Super 1000; Prize: $1,300,000; Format: 32MS/32WS/32MD/32WD/32XD	(South Korea) An Se-young	(Chinese Taipei) Tai Tzu-ying
9–14 January	Malaysia Open (Draw): Host: Kuala Lumpur, Malaysia; Venue: Axiata Arena; Level: Super 1000; Prize: $1,300,000; Format: 32MS/32WS/32MD/32WD/32XD	Score: 10–21, 21–10, 21–18	
9–14 January	Malaysia Open (Draw): Host: Kuala Lumpur, Malaysia; Venue: Axiata Arena; Level: Super 1000; Prize: $1,300,000; Format: 32MS/32WS/32MD/32WD/32XD	(China) Liang Weikeng (China) Wang Chang	(India) Satwiksairaj Rankireddy (India) Chirag Shetty
9–14 January	Malaysia Open (Draw): Host: Kuala Lumpur, Malaysia; Venue: Axiata Arena; Level: Super 1000; Prize: $1,300,000; Format: 32MS/32WS/32MD/32WD/32XD	Score: 9–21, 21–18, 21–17	
9–14 January	Malaysia Open (Draw): Host: Kuala Lumpur, Malaysia; Venue: Axiata Arena; Level: Super 1000; Prize: $1,300,000; Format: 32MS/32WS/32MD/32WD/32XD	(China) Liu Shengshu (China) Tan Ning	(China) Zhang Shuxian (China) Zheng Yu
9–14 January	Malaysia Open (Draw): Host: Kuala Lumpur, Malaysia; Venue: Axiata Arena; Level: Super 1000; Prize: $1,300,000; Format: 32MS/32WS/32MD/32WD/32XD	Score: 21–18, 21–18	
9–14 January	Malaysia Open (Draw): Host: Kuala Lumpur, Malaysia; Venue: Axiata Arena; Level: Super 1000; Prize: $1,300,000; Format: 32MS/32WS/32MD/32WD/32XD	(Japan) Yuta Watanabe (Japan) Arisa Higashino	(South Korea) Kim Won-ho (South Korea) Jeong Na-eun
9–14 January	Malaysia Open (Draw): Host: Kuala Lumpur, Malaysia; Venue: Axiata Arena; Level: Super 1000; Prize: $1,300,000; Format: 32MS/32WS/32MD/32WD/32XD	Score: 21–18, 21–15	
16–21 January	India Open (Draw): Host: New Delhi, India; Venue: K. D. Jadhav Indoor Stadium; Level: Super 750; Prize: $850,000; Format: 32MS/32WS/32MD/32WD/32XD	(China) Shi Yuqi	(Hong Kong) Lee Cheuk Yiu
16–21 January	India Open (Draw): Host: New Delhi, India; Venue: K. D. Jadhav Indoor Stadium; Level: Super 750; Prize: $850,000; Format: 32MS/32WS/32MD/32WD/32XD	Score: 23–21, 21–17	
16–21 January	India Open (Draw): Host: New Delhi, India; Venue: K. D. Jadhav Indoor Stadium; Level: Super 750; Prize: $850,000; Format: 32MS/32WS/32MD/32WD/32XD	(Chinese Taipei) Tai Tzu-ying	(China) Chen Yufei
16–21 January	India Open (Draw): Host: New Delhi, India; Venue: K. D. Jadhav Indoor Stadium; Level: Super 750; Prize: $850,000; Format: 32MS/32WS/32MD/32WD/32XD	Score: 21–16, 21–12	
16–21 January	India Open (Draw): Host: New Delhi, India; Venue: K. D. Jadhav Indoor Stadium; Level: Super 750; Prize: $850,000; Format: 32MS/32WS/32MD/32WD/32XD	(South Korea) Kang Min-hyuk (South Korea) Seo Seung-jae	(India) Satwiksairaj Rankireddy (India) Chirag Shetty
16–21 January	India Open (Draw): Host: New Delhi, India; Venue: K. D. Jadhav Indoor Stadium; Level: Super 750; Prize: $850,000; Format: 32MS/32WS/32MD/32WD/32XD	Score: 15–21, 21–11, 21–18	
16–21 January	India Open (Draw): Host: New Delhi, India; Venue: K. D. Jadhav Indoor Stadium; Level: Super 750; Prize: $850,000; Format: 32MS/32WS/32MD/32WD/32XD	(Japan) Mayu Matsumoto (Japan) Wakana Nagahara	(China) Zhang Shuxian (China) Zheng Yu
16–21 January	India Open (Draw): Host: New Delhi, India; Venue: K. D. Jadhav Indoor Stadium; Level: Super 750; Prize: $850,000; Format: 32MS/32WS/32MD/32WD/32XD	Score: 21–12, 21–13	
16–21 January	India Open (Draw): Host: New Delhi, India; Venue: K. D. Jadhav Indoor Stadium; Level: Super 750; Prize: $850,000; Format: 32MS/32WS/32MD/32WD/32XD	(Thailand) Dechapol Puavaranukroh (Thailand) Sapsiree Taerattanachai	(China) Jiang Zhenbang (China) Wei Yaxin
16–21 January	India Open (Draw): Host: New Delhi, India; Venue: K. D. Jadhav Indoor Stadium; Level: Super 750; Prize: $850,000; Format: 32MS/32WS/32MD/32WD/32XD	Score: 21–16, 21–16	
23–28 January	Indonesia Masters (Draw): Host: Jakarta, Indonesia; Venue: Istora Senayan; Level: Super 500; Prize: $420,000; Format: 32MS/32WS/32MD/32WD/32XD	(Denmark) Anders Antonsen	(Canada) Brian Yang
23–28 January	Indonesia Masters (Draw): Host: Jakarta, Indonesia; Venue: Istora Senayan; Level: Super 500; Prize: $420,000; Format: 32MS/32WS/32MD/32WD/32XD	Score: 18–21, 21–13, 21-18	
23–28 January	Indonesia Masters (Draw): Host: Jakarta, Indonesia; Venue: Istora Senayan; Level: Super 500; Prize: $420,000; Format: 32MS/32WS/32MD/32WD/32XD	(China) Wang Zhiyi	(Japan) Nozomi Okuhara
23–28 January	Indonesia Masters (Draw): Host: Jakarta, Indonesia; Venue: Istora Senayan; Level: Super 500; Prize: $420,000; Format: 32MS/32WS/32MD/32WD/32XD	Score: 21–14, 21–13	
23–28 January	Indonesia Masters (Draw): Host: Jakarta, Indonesia; Venue: Istora Senayan; Level: Super 500; Prize: $420,000; Format: 32MS/32WS/32MD/32WD/32XD	(Indonesia) Leo Rolly Carnando (Indonesia) Daniel Marthin	(Denmark) Kim Astrup (Denmark) Anders Skaarup Rasmussen
23–28 January	Indonesia Masters (Draw): Host: Jakarta, Indonesia; Venue: Istora Senayan; Level: Super 500; Prize: $420,000; Format: 32MS/32WS/32MD/32WD/32XD	Score: 21–12, 20–22, 21–11	
23–28 January	Indonesia Masters (Draw): Host: Jakarta, Indonesia; Venue: Istora Senayan; Level: Super 500; Prize: $420,000; Format: 32MS/32WS/32MD/32WD/32XD	(China) Liu Shengshu (China) Tan Ning	(China) Zhang Shuxian (China) Zheng Yu
23–28 January	Indonesia Masters (Draw): Host: Jakarta, Indonesia; Venue: Istora Senayan; Level: Super 500; Prize: $420,000; Format: 32MS/32WS/32MD/32WD/32XD	Score: 10–21, 21–19, 22–20	
23–28 January	Indonesia Masters (Draw): Host: Jakarta, Indonesia; Venue: Istora Senayan; Level: Super 500; Prize: $420,000; Format: 32MS/32WS/32MD/32WD/32XD	(China) Zheng Siwei (China) Huang Yaqiong	(Japan) Hiroki Midorikawa (Japan) Natsu Saito
23–28 January	Indonesia Masters (Draw): Host: Jakarta, Indonesia; Venue: Istora Senayan; Level: Super 500; Prize: $420,000; Format: 32MS/32WS/32MD/32WD/32XD	Score: 21–15, 21–16	
30 January – 4 February	Thailand Masters (Draw): Host: Bangkok, Thailand; Venue: Nimibutr Stadium; Level: Super 300; Prize: $210,000; Format: 32MS/32WS/32MD/32WD/32XD	(Chinese Taipei) Chou Tien-chen	(Singapore) Loh Kean Yew
30 January – 4 February	Thailand Masters (Draw): Host: Bangkok, Thailand; Venue: Nimibutr Stadium; Level: Super 300; Prize: $210,000; Format: 32MS/32WS/32MD/32WD/32XD	Score: 21–16, 6–21, 21–16	
30 January – 4 February	Thailand Masters (Draw): Host: Bangkok, Thailand; Venue: Nimibutr Stadium; Level: Super 300; Prize: $210,000; Format: 32MS/32WS/32MD/32WD/32XD	(Japan) Aya Ohori	(Thailand) Supanida Katethong
30 January – 4 February	Thailand Masters (Draw): Host: Bangkok, Thailand; Venue: Nimibutr Stadium; Level: Super 300; Prize: $210,000; Format: 32MS/32WS/32MD/32WD/32XD	Score: 18–21, 21–17, 21–13	
30 January – 4 February	Thailand Masters (Draw): Host: Bangkok, Thailand; Venue: Nimibutr Stadium; Level: Super 300; Prize: $210,000; Format: 32MS/32WS/32MD/32WD/32XD	(China) He Jiting (China) Ren Xiangyu	(Thailand) Peeratchai Sukphun (Thailand) Pakkapon Teeraratsakul
30 January – 4 February	Thailand Masters (Draw): Host: Bangkok, Thailand; Venue: Nimibutr Stadium; Level: Super 300; Prize: $210,000; Format: 32MS/32WS/32MD/32WD/32XD	Score: 16–21, 21–14, 21–13	
30 January – 4 February	Thailand Masters (Draw): Host: Bangkok, Thailand; Venue: Nimibutr Stadium; Level: Super 300; Prize: $210,000; Format: 32MS/32WS/32MD/32WD/32XD	(Thailand) Benyapa Aimsaard (Thailand) Nuntakarn Aimsaard	(China) Li Yijing (China) Luo Xumin
30 January – 4 February	Thailand Masters (Draw): Host: Bangkok, Thailand; Venue: Nimibutr Stadium; Level: Super 300; Prize: $210,000; Format: 32MS/32WS/32MD/32WD/32XD	Score: 21–13, 17–21, 27–25	
30 January – 4 February	Thailand Masters (Draw): Host: Bangkok, Thailand; Venue: Nimibutr Stadium; Level: Super 300; Prize: $210,000; Format: 32MS/32WS/32MD/32WD/32XD	(Thailand) Dechapol Puavaranukroh (Thailand) Sapsiree Taerattanachai	(Malaysia) Chen Tang Jie (Malaysia) Toh Ee Wei
30 January – 4 February	Thailand Masters (Draw): Host: Bangkok, Thailand; Venue: Nimibutr Stadium; Level: Super 300; Prize: $210,000; Format: 32MS/32WS/32MD/32WD/32XD	Score: 21–12, 21–18	

=== February ===
Date	Tournament	Champions	Runners-up
27 February – 3 March	German Open (Draw): Host: Mülheim, Germany; Venue: Westenergie Sporthalle; Level: Super 300; Prize: $210,000; Format: 32MS/32WS/32MD/32WD/32XD	(France) Christo Popov	(Denmark) Rasmus Gemke
27 February – 3 March	German Open (Draw): Host: Mülheim, Germany; Venue: Westenergie Sporthalle; Level: Super 300; Prize: $210,000; Format: 32MS/32WS/32MD/32WD/32XD	Score: 21–17, 21–16	
27 February – 3 March	German Open (Draw): Host: Mülheim, Germany; Venue: Westenergie Sporthalle; Level: Super 300; Prize: $210,000; Format: 32MS/32WS/32MD/32WD/32XD	(Denmark) Mia Blichfeldt	(Vietnam) Nguyễn Thùy Linh
27 February – 3 March	German Open (Draw): Host: Mülheim, Germany; Venue: Westenergie Sporthalle; Level: Super 300; Prize: $210,000; Format: 32MS/32WS/32MD/32WD/32XD	Score: 21–11, 21–9	
27 February – 3 March	German Open (Draw): Host: Mülheim, Germany; Venue: Westenergie Sporthalle; Level: Super 300; Prize: $210,000; Format: 32MS/32WS/32MD/32WD/32XD	(Chinese Taipei) Lee Jhe-huei (Chinese Taipei) Yang Po-hsuan	(China) He Jiting (China) Ren Xiangyu
27 February – 3 March	German Open (Draw): Host: Mülheim, Germany; Venue: Westenergie Sporthalle; Level: Super 300; Prize: $210,000; Format: 32MS/32WS/32MD/32WD/32XD	Score: 15–21, 23–21, 23–21	
27 February – 3 March	German Open (Draw): Host: Mülheim, Germany; Venue: Westenergie Sporthalle; Level: Super 300; Prize: $210,000; Format: 32MS/32WS/32MD/32WD/32XD	(China) Li Yijing (China) Luo Xumin	(Bulgaria) Gabriela Stoeva (Bulgaria) Stefani Stoeva
27 February – 3 March	German Open (Draw): Host: Mülheim, Germany; Venue: Westenergie Sporthalle; Level: Super 300; Prize: $210,000; Format: 32MS/32WS/32MD/32WD/32XD	Score: 21–7, 13–21, 21–18	
27 February – 3 March	German Open (Draw): Host: Mülheim, Germany; Venue: Westenergie Sporthalle; Level: Super 300; Prize: $210,000; Format: 32MS/32WS/32MD/32WD/32XD	(Hong Kong) Tang Chun Man (Hong Kong) Tse Ying Suet	(South Korea) Kim Won-ho (South Korea) Jeong Na-eun
27 February – 3 March	German Open (Draw): Host: Mülheim, Germany; Venue: Westenergie Sporthalle; Level: Super 300; Prize: $210,000; Format: 32MS/32WS/32MD/32WD/32XD	Score: 21–13, 21–19	

=== March ===
Date	Tournament	Champions	Runners-up
5–10 March	French Open (Draw): Host: Paris, France; Venue: Adidas Arena; Level: Super 750; Prize: $850,000; Format: 32MS/32WS/32MD/32WD/32XD	(China) Shi Yuqi	(Thailand) Kunlavut Vitidsarn
5–10 March	French Open (Draw): Host: Paris, France; Venue: Adidas Arena; Level: Super 750; Prize: $850,000; Format: 32MS/32WS/32MD/32WD/32XD	Score: 22–20, 21–19	
5–10 March	French Open (Draw): Host: Paris, France; Venue: Adidas Arena; Level: Super 750; Prize: $850,000; Format: 32MS/32WS/32MD/32WD/32XD	(South Korea) An Se-young	(Japan) Akane Yamaguchi
5–10 March	French Open (Draw): Host: Paris, France; Venue: Adidas Arena; Level: Super 750; Prize: $850,000; Format: 32MS/32WS/32MD/32WD/32XD	Score: 18–21, 21–13, 21–10	
5–10 March	French Open (Draw): Host: Paris, France; Venue: Adidas Arena; Level: Super 750; Prize: $850,000; Format: 32MS/32WS/32MD/32WD/32XD	(India) Satwiksairaj Rankireddy (India) Chirag Shetty	(Chinese Taipei) Lee Jhe-huei (Chinese Taipei) Yang Po-hsuan
5–10 March	French Open (Draw): Host: Paris, France; Venue: Adidas Arena; Level: Super 750; Prize: $850,000; Format: 32MS/32WS/32MD/32WD/32XD	Score: 21–11, 21–17	
5–10 March	French Open (Draw): Host: Paris, France; Venue: Adidas Arena; Level: Super 750; Prize: $850,000; Format: 32MS/32WS/32MD/32WD/32XD	(China) Chen Qingchen (China) Jia Yifan	(Japan) Nami Matsuyama (Japan) Chiharu Shida
5–10 March	French Open (Draw): Host: Paris, France; Venue: Adidas Arena; Level: Super 750; Prize: $850,000; Format: 32MS/32WS/32MD/32WD/32XD	Score: 21–12, 19–21, 24–22	
5–10 March	French Open (Draw): Host: Paris, France; Venue: Adidas Arena; Level: Super 750; Prize: $850,000; Format: 32MS/32WS/32MD/32WD/32XD	(China) Feng Yanzhe (China) Huang Dongping	(South Korea) Seo Seung-jae (South Korea) Chae Yoo-jung
5–10 March	French Open (Draw): Host: Paris, France; Venue: Adidas Arena; Level: Super 750; Prize: $850,000; Format: 32MS/32WS/32MD/32WD/32XD	Score: 21–16, 21–16	
12–17 March	All England Open (Draw): Host: Birmingham, England; Venue: Utilita Arena Birmingham; Level: Super 1000; Prize: $1,300,000; Format: 32MS/32WS/32MD/32WD/32XD	(Indonesia) Jonatan Christie	(Indonesia) Anthony Sinisuka Ginting
12–17 March	All England Open (Draw): Host: Birmingham, England; Venue: Utilita Arena Birmingham; Level: Super 1000; Prize: $1,300,000; Format: 32MS/32WS/32MD/32WD/32XD	Score: 21–15, 21–14	
12–17 March	All England Open (Draw): Host: Birmingham, England; Venue: Utilita Arena Birmingham; Level: Super 1000; Prize: $1,300,000; Format: 32MS/32WS/32MD/32WD/32XD	(Spain) Carolina Marín	(Japan) Akane Yamaguchi
12–17 March	All England Open (Draw): Host: Birmingham, England; Venue: Utilita Arena Birmingham; Level: Super 1000; Prize: $1,300,000; Format: 32MS/32WS/32MD/32WD/32XD	Score: 26–14, 11–1^{r}	
12–17 March	All England Open (Draw): Host: Birmingham, England; Venue: Utilita Arena Birmingham; Level: Super 1000; Prize: $1,300,000; Format: 32MS/32WS/32MD/32WD/32XD	(Indonesia) Fajar Alfian (Indonesia) Muhammad Rian Ardianto	(Malaysia) Aaron Chia (Malaysia) Soh Wooi Yik
12–17 March	All England Open (Draw): Host: Birmingham, England; Venue: Utilita Arena Birmingham; Level: Super 1000; Prize: $1,300,000; Format: 32MS/32WS/32MD/32WD/32XD	Score: 21–16, 21–16	
12–17 March	All England Open (Draw): Host: Birmingham, England; Venue: Utilita Arena Birmingham; Level: Super 1000; Prize: $1,300,000; Format: 32MS/32WS/32MD/32WD/32XD	(South Korea) Baek Ha-na (South Korea) Lee So-hee	(Japan) Nami Matsuyama (Japan) Chiharu Shida
12–17 March	All England Open (Draw): Host: Birmingham, England; Venue: Utilita Arena Birmingham; Level: Super 1000; Prize: $1,300,000; Format: 32MS/32WS/32MD/32WD/32XD	Score: 21–19, 11–21, 21–17	
12–17 March	All England Open (Draw): Host: Birmingham, England; Venue: Utilita Arena Birmingham; Level: Super 1000; Prize: $1,300,000; Format: 32MS/32WS/32MD/32WD/32XD	(China) Zheng Siwei (China) Huang Yaqiong	(Japan) Yuta Watanabe (Japan) Arisa Higashino
12–17 March	All England Open (Draw): Host: Birmingham, England; Venue: Utilita Arena Birmingham; Level: Super 1000; Prize: $1,300,000; Format: 32MS/32WS/32MD/32WD/32XD	Score: 21–16, 21–11	
12–17 March	Orléans Masters (Draw): Host: Orléans, France; Venue: Palais des Sports; Level: Super 300; Prize: $210,000; Format: 32MS/32WS/32MD/32WD/32XD	(Japan) Yushi Tanaka	(Japan) Koo Takahashi
12–17 March	Orléans Masters (Draw): Host: Orléans, France; Venue: Palais des Sports; Level: Super 300; Prize: $210,000; Format: 32MS/32WS/32MD/32WD/32XD	Score: 21–18, 21–10	
12–17 March	Orléans Masters (Draw): Host: Orléans, France; Venue: Palais des Sports; Level: Super 300; Prize: $210,000; Format: 32MS/32WS/32MD/32WD/32XD	(Japan) Tomoka Miyazaki	(Japan) Hina Akechi
12–17 March	Orléans Masters (Draw): Host: Orléans, France; Venue: Palais des Sports; Level: Super 300; Prize: $210,000; Format: 32MS/32WS/32MD/32WD/32XD	Score: 21–18, 21–12	
12–17 March	Orléans Masters (Draw): Host: Orléans, France; Venue: Palais des Sports; Level: Super 300; Prize: $210,000; Format: 32MS/32WS/32MD/32WD/32XD	(Malaysia) Choong Hon Jian (Malaysia) Muhammad Haikal	(Indonesia) Sabar Karyaman Gutama (Indonesia) Muhammad Reza Pahlevi Isfahani
12–17 March	Orléans Masters (Draw): Host: Orléans, France; Venue: Palais des Sports; Level: Super 300; Prize: $210,000; Format: 32MS/32WS/32MD/32WD/32XD	Score: 21–15, 18–21, 21–14	
12–17 March	Orléans Masters (Draw): Host: Orléans, France; Venue: Palais des Sports; Level: Super 300; Prize: $210,000; Format: 32MS/32WS/32MD/32WD/32XD	(Indonesia) Meilysa Trias Puspita Sari (Indonesia) Rachel Allessya Rose	(Japan) Rui Hirokami (Japan) Yuna Kato
12–17 March	Orléans Masters (Draw): Host: Orléans, France; Venue: Palais des Sports; Level: Super 300; Prize: $210,000; Format: 32MS/32WS/32MD/32WD/32XD	Score: 21–12, 21–18	
12–17 March	Orléans Masters (Draw): Host: Orléans, France; Venue: Palais des Sports; Level: Super 300; Prize: $210,000; Format: 32MS/32WS/32MD/32WD/32XD	(China) Cheng Xing (China) Zhang Chi	(Indonesia) Rinov Rivaldy (Indonesia) Pitha Haningtyas Mentari
12–17 March	Orléans Masters (Draw): Host: Orléans, France; Venue: Palais des Sports; Level: Super 300; Prize: $210,000; Format: 32MS/32WS/32MD/32WD/32XD	Score: 16–21, 21–18, 21–15	
19–24 March	Swiss Open (Draw): Host: Basel, Switzerland; Venue: St. Jakobshalle; Level: Super 300; Prize: $210,000; Format: 32MS/32WS/32MD/32WD/32XD	(Chinese Taipei) Lin Chun-yi	(Chinese Taipei) Chou Tien-chen
19–24 March	Swiss Open (Draw): Host: Basel, Switzerland; Venue: St. Jakobshalle; Level: Super 300; Prize: $210,000; Format: 32MS/32WS/32MD/32WD/32XD	Score: 7–21, 22–20, 23–21	
19–24 March	Swiss Open (Draw): Host: Basel, Switzerland; Venue: St. Jakobshalle; Level: Super 300; Prize: $210,000; Format: 32MS/32WS/32MD/32WD/32XD	(Spain) Carolina Marín	(Indonesia) Gregoria Mariska Tunjung
19–24 March	Swiss Open (Draw): Host: Basel, Switzerland; Venue: St. Jakobshalle; Level: Super 300; Prize: $210,000; Format: 32MS/32WS/32MD/32WD/32XD	Score: 21–19, 13–21, 22–20	
19–24 March	Swiss Open (Draw): Host: Basel, Switzerland; Venue: St. Jakobshalle; Level: Super 300; Prize: $210,000; Format: 32MS/32WS/32MD/32WD/32XD	(England) Ben Lane (England) Sean Vendy	(Indonesia) Muhammad Shohibul Fikri (Indonesia) Bagas Maulana
19–24 March	Swiss Open (Draw): Host: Basel, Switzerland; Venue: St. Jakobshalle; Level: Super 300; Prize: $210,000; Format: 32MS/32WS/32MD/32WD/32XD	Score: 24–22, 28–26	
19–24 March	Swiss Open (Draw): Host: Basel, Switzerland; Venue: St. Jakobshalle; Level: Super 300; Prize: $210,000; Format: 32MS/32WS/32MD/32WD/32XD	(Indonesia) Lanny Tria Mayasari (Indonesia) Ribka Sugiarto	(Chinese Taipei) Hsu Ya-ching (Chinese Taipei) Lin Wan-ching
19–24 March	Swiss Open (Draw): Host: Basel, Switzerland; Venue: St. Jakobshalle; Level: Super 300; Prize: $210,000; Format: 32MS/32WS/32MD/32WD/32XD	Score: 13–21, 21–16, 21–8	
19–24 March	Swiss Open (Draw): Host: Basel, Switzerland; Venue: St. Jakobshalle; Level: Super 300; Prize: $210,000; Format: 32MS/32WS/32MD/32WD/32XD	(Malaysia) Goh Soon Huat (Malaysia) Shevon Jemie Lai	(Malaysia) Chen Tang Jie (Malaysia) Toh Ee Wei
19–24 March	Swiss Open (Draw): Host: Basel, Switzerland; Venue: St. Jakobshalle; Level: Super 300; Prize: $210,000; Format: 32MS/32WS/32MD/32WD/32XD	Score: 21–16, 21–13	
19–24 March	Ruichang China Masters (Draw): Host: Ruichang, China; Venue: Ruichang Sports Park Gym; Level: Super 100; Prize: $100,000; Format: 48MS/32WS/32MD/32WD/32XD	(China) Wang Zhengxing	(China) Liu Liang
19–24 March	Ruichang China Masters (Draw): Host: Ruichang, China; Venue: Ruichang Sports Park Gym; Level: Super 100; Prize: $100,000; Format: 48MS/32WS/32MD/32WD/32XD	Score: 21–19, 17–21, 21–17	
19–24 March	Ruichang China Masters (Draw): Host: Ruichang, China; Venue: Ruichang Sports Park Gym; Level: Super 100; Prize: $100,000; Format: 48MS/32WS/32MD/32WD/32XD	(Japan) Kaoru Sugiyama	(Chinese Taipei) Chiu Pin-chian
19–24 March	Ruichang China Masters (Draw): Host: Ruichang, China; Venue: Ruichang Sports Park Gym; Level: Super 100; Prize: $100,000; Format: 48MS/32WS/32MD/32WD/32XD	Score: 21–14, 14–21, 21–13	
19–24 March	Ruichang China Masters (Draw): Host: Ruichang, China; Venue: Ruichang Sports Park Gym; Level: Super 100; Prize: $100,000; Format: 48MS/32WS/32MD/32WD/32XD	(China) Tan Qiang (China) Zhou Haodong	(Chinese Taipei) Chang Chien-wei (Chinese Taipei) Wu Hsuan-yi
19–24 March	Ruichang China Masters (Draw): Host: Ruichang, China; Venue: Ruichang Sports Park Gym; Level: Super 100; Prize: $100,000; Format: 48MS/32WS/32MD/32WD/32XD	Score: 21–15, 21–15	
19–24 March	Ruichang China Masters (Draw): Host: Ruichang, China; Venue: Ruichang Sports Park Gym; Level: Super 100; Prize: $100,000; Format: 48MS/32WS/32MD/32WD/32XD	(Thailand) Laksika Kanlaha (Thailand) Phataimas Muenwong	(China) Chen Xiaofei (China) Feng Xueying
19–24 March	Ruichang China Masters (Draw): Host: Ruichang, China; Venue: Ruichang Sports Park Gym; Level: Super 100; Prize: $100,000; Format: 48MS/32WS/32MD/32WD/32XD	Score: 17–21, 21–15, 21–16	
19–24 March	Ruichang China Masters (Draw): Host: Ruichang, China; Venue: Ruichang Sports Park Gym; Level: Super 100; Prize: $100,000; Format: 48MS/32WS/32MD/32WD/32XD	(China) Zhou Zhihong (China) Yang Jiayi	(China) Guo Xinwa (China) Li Qian
19–24 March	Ruichang China Masters (Draw): Host: Ruichang, China; Venue: Ruichang Sports Park Gym; Level: Super 100; Prize: $100,000; Format: 48MS/32WS/32MD/32WD/32XD	Score: 21–18, 21–15	
26–31 March	Spain Masters (Draw): Host: Madrid, Spain; Venue: Centro Deportivo Municipal Gallur; Level: Super 300; Prize: $210,000; Format: 32MS/32WS/32MD/32WD/32XD	(Singapore) Loh Kean Yew	(France) Toma Junior Popov
26–31 March	Spain Masters (Draw): Host: Madrid, Spain; Venue: Centro Deportivo Municipal Gallur; Level: Super 300; Prize: $210,000; Format: 32MS/32WS/32MD/32WD/32XD	Score: 21–11, 15–21, 22–20	
26–31 March	Spain Masters (Draw): Host: Madrid, Spain; Venue: Centro Deportivo Municipal Gallur; Level: Super 300; Prize: $210,000; Format: 32MS/32WS/32MD/32WD/32XD	(Thailand) Ratchanok Intanon	(Thailand) Supanida Katethong
26–31 March	Spain Masters (Draw): Host: Madrid, Spain; Venue: Centro Deportivo Municipal Gallur; Level: Super 300; Prize: $210,000; Format: 32MS/32WS/32MD/32WD/32XD	Score: 21–12, 21–9	
26–31 March	Spain Masters (Draw): Host: Madrid, Spain; Venue: Centro Deportivo Municipal Gallur; Level: Super 300; Prize: $210,000; Format: 32MS/32WS/32MD/32WD/32XD	(Indonesia) Sabar Karyaman Gutama (Indonesia) Muhammad Reza Pahlevi Isfahani	(Malaysia) Junaidi Arif (Malaysia) Yap Roy King
26–31 March	Spain Masters (Draw): Host: Madrid, Spain; Venue: Centro Deportivo Municipal Gallur; Level: Super 300; Prize: $210,000; Format: 32MS/32WS/32MD/32WD/32XD	Score: 21–18, 17–21, 21–19	
26–31 March	Spain Masters (Draw): Host: Madrid, Spain; Venue: Centro Deportivo Municipal Gallur; Level: Super 300; Prize: $210,000; Format: 32MS/32WS/32MD/32WD/32XD	(Japan) Rin Iwanaga (Japan) Kie Nakanishi	(Indonesia) Febriana Dwipuji Kusuma (Indonesia) Amallia Cahaya Pratiwi
26–31 March	Spain Masters (Draw): Host: Madrid, Spain; Venue: Centro Deportivo Municipal Gallur; Level: Super 300; Prize: $210,000; Format: 32MS/32WS/32MD/32WD/32XD	Score: 12–21, 21–8, 21–16	
26–31 March	Spain Masters (Draw): Host: Madrid, Spain; Venue: Centro Deportivo Municipal Gallur; Level: Super 300; Prize: $210,000; Format: 32MS/32WS/32MD/32WD/32XD	(Indonesia) Rinov Rivaldy (Indonesia) Pitha Haningtyas Mentari	(China) Cheng Xing (China) Zhang Chi
26–31 March	Spain Masters (Draw): Host: Madrid, Spain; Venue: Centro Deportivo Municipal Gallur; Level: Super 300; Prize: $210,000; Format: 32MS/32WS/32MD/32WD/32XD	Score: 17–21, 21–12, 21–13	

=== April ===
No World Tour tournament held in April.

=== May ===
Date	Tournament	Champions	Runners-up
14–19 May	Thailand Open (Draw): Host: Bangkok, Thailand; Venue: Nimibutr Stadium; Level: Super 500; Prize: $420,000; Format: 32MS/32WS/32MD/32WD/32XD	(Malaysia) Lee Zii Jia	(Hong Kong) Ng Ka Long Angus
14–19 May	Thailand Open (Draw): Host: Bangkok, Thailand; Venue: Nimibutr Stadium; Level: Super 500; Prize: $420,000; Format: 32MS/32WS/32MD/32WD/32XD	Score: 21–11, 21–10	
14–19 May	Thailand Open (Draw): Host: Bangkok, Thailand; Venue: Nimibutr Stadium; Level: Super 500; Prize: $420,000; Format: 32MS/32WS/32MD/32WD/32XD	(Thailand) Supanida Katethong	(China) Han Yue
14–19 May	Thailand Open (Draw): Host: Bangkok, Thailand; Venue: Nimibutr Stadium; Level: Super 500; Prize: $420,000; Format: 32MS/32WS/32MD/32WD/32XD	Score: 21–16, 25–23	
14–19 May	Thailand Open (Draw): Host: Bangkok, Thailand; Venue: Nimibutr Stadium; Level: Super 500; Prize: $420,000; Format: 32MS/32WS/32MD/32WD/32XD	(India) Satwiksairaj Rankireddy (India) Chirag Shetty	(China) Chen Boyang (China) Liu Yi
14–19 May	Thailand Open (Draw): Host: Bangkok, Thailand; Venue: Nimibutr Stadium; Level: Super 500; Prize: $420,000; Format: 32MS/32WS/32MD/32WD/32XD	Score: 21–15, 21–15	
14–19 May	Thailand Open (Draw): Host: Bangkok, Thailand; Venue: Nimibutr Stadium; Level: Super 500; Prize: $420,000; Format: 32MS/32WS/32MD/32WD/32XD	(Thailand) Jongkolphan Kititharakul (Thailand) Rawinda Prajongjai	(Indonesia) Febriana Dwipuji Kusuma (Indonesia) Amalia Cahaya Pratiwi
14–19 May	Thailand Open (Draw): Host: Bangkok, Thailand; Venue: Nimibutr Stadium; Level: Super 500; Prize: $420,000; Format: 32MS/32WS/32MD/32WD/32XD	Score: 21–14, 21–14	
14–19 May	Thailand Open (Draw): Host: Bangkok, Thailand; Venue: Nimibutr Stadium; Level: Super 500; Prize: $420,000; Format: 32MS/32WS/32MD/32WD/32XD	(China) Guo Xinwa (China) Chen Fanghui	(Thailand) Dechapol Puavaranukroh (Thailand) Sapsiree Taerattanachai
14–19 May	Thailand Open (Draw): Host: Bangkok, Thailand; Venue: Nimibutr Stadium; Level: Super 500; Prize: $420,000; Format: 32MS/32WS/32MD/32WD/32XD	Score: 12–21, 21–12, 21–18	
21–26 May	Malaysia Masters (Draw): Host: Kuala Lumpur, Malaysia; Venue: Axiata Arena; Level: Super 500; Prize: $420,000; Format: 32MS/32WS/32MD/32WD/32XD	(Denmark) Viktor Axelsen	(Malaysia) Lee Zii Jia
21–26 May	Malaysia Masters (Draw): Host: Kuala Lumpur, Malaysia; Venue: Axiata Arena; Level: Super 500; Prize: $420,000; Format: 32MS/32WS/32MD/32WD/32XD	Score: 21–6, 20–22, 21–13	
21–26 May	Malaysia Masters (Draw): Host: Kuala Lumpur, Malaysia; Venue: Axiata Arena; Level: Super 500; Prize: $420,000; Format: 32MS/32WS/32MD/32WD/32XD	(China) Wang Zhiyi	(India) P. V. Sindhu
21–26 May	Malaysia Masters (Draw): Host: Kuala Lumpur, Malaysia; Venue: Axiata Arena; Level: Super 500; Prize: $420,000; Format: 32MS/32WS/32MD/32WD/32XD	Score: 16–21, 21–5, 21–16	
21–26 May	Malaysia Masters (Draw): Host: Kuala Lumpur, Malaysia; Venue: Axiata Arena; Level: Super 500; Prize: $420,000; Format: 32MS/32WS/32MD/32WD/32XD	(Denmark) Kim Astrup (Denmark) Anders Skaarup Rasmussen	(South Korea) Jin Yong (South Korea) Na Sung-seung
21–26 May	Malaysia Masters (Draw): Host: Kuala Lumpur, Malaysia; Venue: Axiata Arena; Level: Super 500; Prize: $420,000; Format: 32MS/32WS/32MD/32WD/32XD	Score: 21–18, 21–14	
21–26 May	Malaysia Masters (Draw): Host: Kuala Lumpur, Malaysia; Venue: Axiata Arena; Level: Super 500; Prize: $420,000; Format: 32MS/32WS/32MD/32WD/32XD	(Japan) Rin Iwanaga (Japan) Kie Nakanishi	(South Korea) Lee Yu-lim (South Korea) Shin Seung-chan
21–26 May	Malaysia Masters (Draw): Host: Kuala Lumpur, Malaysia; Venue: Axiata Arena; Level: Super 500; Prize: $420,000; Format: 32MS/32WS/32MD/32WD/32XD	Score: 17–21, 21–19, 21–18	
21–26 May	Malaysia Masters (Draw): Host: Kuala Lumpur, Malaysia; Venue: Axiata Arena; Level: Super 500; Prize: $420,000; Format: 32MS/32WS/32MD/32WD/32XD	(Malaysia) Goh Soon Huat (Malaysia) Shevon Jemie Lai	(Indonesia) Rinov Rivaldy (Indonesia) Pitha Haningtyas Mentari
21–26 May	Malaysia Masters (Draw): Host: Kuala Lumpur, Malaysia; Venue: Axiata Arena; Level: Super 500; Prize: $420,000; Format: 32MS/32WS/32MD/32WD/32XD	Score: 21–18, 21–19	
28 May – 2 June	Singapore Open (Draw): Host: Singapore; Venue: Singapore Indoor Stadium; Level: Super 750; Prize: $850,000; Format: 32MS/32WS/32MD/32WD/32XD	(China) Shi Yuqi	(China) Li Shifeng
28 May – 2 June	Singapore Open (Draw): Host: Singapore; Venue: Singapore Indoor Stadium; Level: Super 750; Prize: $850,000; Format: 32MS/32WS/32MD/32WD/32XD	Score: 17–21, 21–19, 21–19	
28 May – 2 June	Singapore Open (Draw): Host: Singapore; Venue: Singapore Indoor Stadium; Level: Super 750; Prize: $850,000; Format: 32MS/32WS/32MD/32WD/32XD	(South Korea) An Se-young	(China) Chen Yufei
28 May – 2 June	Singapore Open (Draw): Host: Singapore; Venue: Singapore Indoor Stadium; Level: Super 750; Prize: $850,000; Format: 32MS/32WS/32MD/32WD/32XD	Score: 21–19, 16–21, 21–12	
28 May – 2 June	Singapore Open (Draw): Host: Singapore; Venue: Singapore Indoor Stadium; Level: Super 750; Prize: $850,000; Format: 32MS/32WS/32MD/32WD/32XD	(China) He Jiting (China) Ren Xiangyu	(Indonesia) Fajar Alfian (Indonesia) Muhammad Rian Ardianto
28 May – 2 June	Singapore Open (Draw): Host: Singapore; Venue: Singapore Indoor Stadium; Level: Super 750; Prize: $850,000; Format: 32MS/32WS/32MD/32WD/32XD	Score: 21–19, 21–14	
28 May – 2 June	Singapore Open (Draw): Host: Singapore; Venue: Singapore Indoor Stadium; Level: Super 750; Prize: $850,000; Format: 32MS/32WS/32MD/32WD/32XD	(China) Chen Qingchen (China) Jia Yifan	(Japan) Nami Matsuyama (Japan) Chiharu Shida
28 May – 2 June	Singapore Open (Draw): Host: Singapore; Venue: Singapore Indoor Stadium; Level: Super 750; Prize: $850,000; Format: 32MS/32WS/32MD/32WD/32XD	Score: 21–15, 21–12	
28 May – 2 June	Singapore Open (Draw): Host: Singapore; Venue: Singapore Indoor Stadium; Level: Super 750; Prize: $850,000; Format: 32MS/32WS/32MD/32WD/32XD	(China) Zheng Siwei (China) Huang Yaqiong	(Chinese Taipei) Yang Po-hsuan (Chinese Taipei) Hu Ling-fang
28 May – 2 June	Singapore Open (Draw): Host: Singapore; Venue: Singapore Indoor Stadium; Level: Super 750; Prize: $850,000; Format: 32MS/32WS/32MD/32WD/32XD	Score: 21–11, 21–19	

=== June ===
Date	Tournament	Champions	Runners-up
4–9 June	Indonesia Open (Draw): Host: Jakarta, Indonesia; Venue: Istora Senayan; Level: Super 1000; Prize: $1,300,000; Format: 32MS/32WS/32MD/32WD/32XD	(China) Shi Yuqi	(Denmark) Anders Antonsen
4–9 June	Indonesia Open (Draw): Host: Jakarta, Indonesia; Venue: Istora Senayan; Level: Super 1000; Prize: $1,300,000; Format: 32MS/32WS/32MD/32WD/32XD	Score: 21–9, 12–21, 21–14	
4–9 June	Indonesia Open (Draw): Host: Jakarta, Indonesia; Venue: Istora Senayan; Level: Super 1000; Prize: $1,300,000; Format: 32MS/32WS/32MD/32WD/32XD	(China) Chen Yufei	(South Korea) An Se-young
4–9 June	Indonesia Open (Draw): Host: Jakarta, Indonesia; Venue: Istora Senayan; Level: Super 1000; Prize: $1,300,000; Format: 32MS/32WS/32MD/32WD/32XD	Score: 21–14, 14–21, 21–18	
4–9 June	Indonesia Open (Draw): Host: Jakarta, Indonesia; Venue: Istora Senayan; Level: Super 1000; Prize: $1,300,000; Format: 32MS/32WS/32MD/32WD/32XD	(China) Liang Weikeng (China) Wang Chang	(Malaysia) Man Wei Chong (Malaysia) Tee Kai Wun
4–9 June	Indonesia Open (Draw): Host: Jakarta, Indonesia; Venue: Istora Senayan; Level: Super 1000; Prize: $1,300,000; Format: 32MS/32WS/32MD/32WD/32XD	Score: 19–21, 21–16, 21–12	
4–9 June	Indonesia Open (Draw): Host: Jakarta, Indonesia; Venue: Istora Senayan; Level: Super 1000; Prize: $1,300,000; Format: 32MS/32WS/32MD/32WD/32XD	(South Korea) Baek Ha-na (South Korea) Lee So-hee	(China) Chen Qingchen (China) Jia Yifan
4–9 June	Indonesia Open (Draw): Host: Jakarta, Indonesia; Venue: Istora Senayan; Level: Super 1000; Prize: $1,300,000; Format: 32MS/32WS/32MD/32WD/32XD	Score: 21–17, 21–13	
4–9 June	Indonesia Open (Draw): Host: Jakarta, Indonesia; Venue: Istora Senayan; Level: Super 1000; Prize: $1,300,000; Format: 32MS/32WS/32MD/32WD/32XD	(China) Jiang Zhenbang (China) Wei Yaxin	(China) Zheng Siwei (China) Huang Yaqiong
4–9 June	Indonesia Open (Draw): Host: Jakarta, Indonesia; Venue: Istora Senayan; Level: Super 1000; Prize: $1,300,000; Format: 32MS/32WS/32MD/32WD/32XD	Score: 21–11, 21–14	
11–16 June	Australian Open (Draw): Host: Sydney, Australia; Venue: Quaycentre; Level: Super 500; Prize: $420,000; Format: 32MS/32WS/32MD/32WD/32XD	(Malaysia) Lee Zii Jia	(Japan) Kodai Naraoka
11–16 June	Australian Open (Draw): Host: Sydney, Australia; Venue: Quaycentre; Level: Super 500; Prize: $420,000; Format: 32MS/32WS/32MD/32WD/32XD	Score: 21–19, 11–21, 21–18	
11–16 June	Australian Open (Draw): Host: Sydney, Australia; Venue: Quaycentre; Level: Super 500; Prize: $420,000; Format: 32MS/32WS/32MD/32WD/32XD	(Japan) Aya Ohori	(Indonesia) Ester Nurumi Tri Wardoyo
11–16 June	Australian Open (Draw): Host: Sydney, Australia; Venue: Quaycentre; Level: Super 500; Prize: $420,000; Format: 32MS/32WS/32MD/32WD/32XD	Score: 17–21, 21–19, 21–16	
11–16 June	Australian Open (Draw): Host: Sydney, Australia; Venue: Quaycentre; Level: Super 500; Prize: $420,000; Format: 32MS/32WS/32MD/32WD/32XD	(China) He Jiting (China) Ren Xiangyu	(Indonesia) Mohammad Ahsan (Indonesia) Hendra Setiawan
11–16 June	Australian Open (Draw): Host: Sydney, Australia; Venue: Quaycentre; Level: Super 500; Prize: $420,000; Format: 32MS/32WS/32MD/32WD/32XD	Score: 21–11, 21–10	
11–16 June	Australian Open (Draw): Host: Sydney, Australia; Venue: Quaycentre; Level: Super 500; Prize: $420,000; Format: 32MS/32WS/32MD/32WD/32XD	(Indonesia) Febriana Dwipuji Kusuma (Indonesia) Amalia Cahaya Pratiwi	(Malaysia) Lai Pei Jing (Malaysia) Lim Chiew Sien
11–16 June	Australian Open (Draw): Host: Sydney, Australia; Venue: Quaycentre; Level: Super 500; Prize: $420,000; Format: 32MS/32WS/32MD/32WD/32XD	Score: 12–21, 21–7, 21–13	
11–16 June	Australian Open (Draw): Host: Sydney, Australia; Venue: Quaycentre; Level: Super 500; Prize: $420,000; Format: 32MS/32WS/32MD/32WD/32XD	(China) Jiang Zhenbang (China) Wei Yaxin	(China) Guo Xinwa (China) Chen Fanghui
11–16 June	Australian Open (Draw): Host: Sydney, Australia; Venue: Quaycentre; Level: Super 500; Prize: $420,000; Format: 32MS/32WS/32MD/32WD/32XD	Score: 21–12, 16–21, 21–12	
18 June – 23 June	New Zealand Open (cancelled): Host: Auckland, New Zealand; Venue: TBC; Level: Super 300; Prize: $210,000; Format: TBC		
18 June – 23 June	New Zealand Open (cancelled): Host: Auckland, New Zealand; Venue: TBC; Level: Super 300; Prize: $210,000; Format: TBC	Score:	
18 June – 23 June	New Zealand Open (cancelled): Host: Auckland, New Zealand; Venue: TBC; Level: Super 300; Prize: $210,000; Format: TBC	Score:	
18 June – 23 June	New Zealand Open (cancelled): Host: Auckland, New Zealand; Venue: TBC; Level: Super 300; Prize: $210,000; Format: TBC	Score:	
18 June – 23 June	New Zealand Open (cancelled): Host: Auckland, New Zealand; Venue: TBC; Level: Super 300; Prize: $210,000; Format: TBC	Score:	
18 June – 23 June	New Zealand Open (cancelled): Host: Auckland, New Zealand; Venue: TBC; Level: Super 300; Prize: $210,000; Format: TBC	Score:	
18 June – 23 June	Kaohsiung Masters (Draw): Host: Kaohsiung, Taiwan; Venue: Kaohsiung Arena; Level: Super 100; Prize: $100,000; Format: 48MS/32WS/32MD/32WD/32XD	(Chinese Taipei) Lee Chia-hao	(Malaysia) Cheam June Wei
18 June – 23 June	Kaohsiung Masters (Draw): Host: Kaohsiung, Taiwan; Venue: Kaohsiung Arena; Level: Super 100; Prize: $100,000; Format: 48MS/32WS/32MD/32WD/32XD	Score: 21–15, 21–12	
18 June – 23 June	Kaohsiung Masters (Draw): Host: Kaohsiung, Taiwan; Venue: Kaohsiung Arena; Level: Super 100; Prize: $100,000; Format: 48MS/32WS/32MD/32WD/32XD	(Chinese Taipei) Hsu Wen-chi	(Chinese Taipei) Pai Yu-po
18 June – 23 June	Kaohsiung Masters (Draw): Host: Kaohsiung, Taiwan; Venue: Kaohsiung Arena; Level: Super 100; Prize: $100,000; Format: 48MS/32WS/32MD/32WD/32XD	Score: 22–20, 21–18	
18 June – 23 June	Kaohsiung Masters (Draw): Host: Kaohsiung, Taiwan; Venue: Kaohsiung Arena; Level: Super 100; Prize: $100,000; Format: 48MS/32WS/32MD/32WD/32XD	(Chinese Taipei) Chang Ko-chi (Chinese Taipei) Chen Xin-yuan	(Chinese Taipei) Chen Zhi-ray (Chinese Taipei) Lin Yu-chieh
18 June – 23 June	Kaohsiung Masters (Draw): Host: Kaohsiung, Taiwan; Venue: Kaohsiung Arena; Level: Super 100; Prize: $100,000; Format: 48MS/32WS/32MD/32WD/32XD	Score: 19–21, 21–16, 22–20	
18 June – 23 June	Kaohsiung Masters (Draw): Host: Kaohsiung, Taiwan; Venue: Kaohsiung Arena; Level: Super 100; Prize: $100,000; Format: 48MS/32WS/32MD/32WD/32XD	(Indonesia) Jesita Putri Miantoro (Indonesia) Febi Setianingrum	(Chinese Taipei) Sung Shuo-yun (Chinese Taipei) Yu Chien-hui
18 June – 23 June	Kaohsiung Masters (Draw): Host: Kaohsiung, Taiwan; Venue: Kaohsiung Arena; Level: Super 100; Prize: $100,000; Format: 48MS/32WS/32MD/32WD/32XD	Score: 21–14, 21–18	
18 June – 23 June	Kaohsiung Masters (Draw): Host: Kaohsiung, Taiwan; Venue: Kaohsiung Arena; Level: Super 100; Prize: $100,000; Format: 48MS/32WS/32MD/32WD/32XD	(Thailand) Ruttanapak Oupthong (Thailand) Jhenicha Sudjaipraparat	(Chinese Taipei) Yang Po-hsuan (Chinese Taipei) Hu Ling-fang
18 June – 23 June	Kaohsiung Masters (Draw): Host: Kaohsiung, Taiwan; Venue: Kaohsiung Arena; Level: Super 100; Prize: $100,000; Format: 48MS/32WS/32MD/32WD/32XD	Score: 21–18, 21–13	
25–30 June	U.S. Open (Draw): Host: Fort Worth, United States; Venue: Fort Worth Convention Center; Level: Super 300; Prize: $210,000; Format: 32MS/32WS/32MD/32WD/32XD	(Japan) Yushi Tanaka	(China) Lei Lanxi
25–30 June	U.S. Open (Draw): Host: Fort Worth, United States; Venue: Fort Worth Convention Center; Level: Super 300; Prize: $210,000; Format: 32MS/32WS/32MD/32WD/32XD	Score: 15–21, 21–18, 21–15	
25–30 June	U.S. Open (Draw): Host: Fort Worth, United States; Venue: Fort Worth Convention Center; Level: Super 300; Prize: $210,000; Format: 32MS/32WS/32MD/32WD/32XD	(Japan) Natsuki Nidaira	(United States) Beiwen Zhang
25–30 June	U.S. Open (Draw): Host: Fort Worth, United States; Venue: Fort Worth Convention Center; Level: Super 300; Prize: $210,000; Format: 32MS/32WS/32MD/32WD/32XD	Score: 17–21, 21–18, 24–22	
25–30 June	U.S. Open (Draw): Host: Fort Worth, United States; Venue: Fort Worth Convention Center; Level: Super 300; Prize: $210,000; Format: 32MS/32WS/32MD/32WD/32XD	(Thailand) Peeratchai Sukphun (Thailand) Pakkapon Teeraratsakul	(Chinese Taipei) Liu Kuang-heng (Chinese Taipei) Yang Po-han
25–30 June	U.S. Open (Draw): Host: Fort Worth, United States; Venue: Fort Worth Convention Center; Level: Super 300; Prize: $210,000; Format: 32MS/32WS/32MD/32WD/32XD	Score: 13–21, 21–16, 21–11	
25–30 June	U.S. Open (Draw): Host: Fort Worth, United States; Venue: Fort Worth Convention Center; Level: Super 300; Prize: $210,000; Format: 32MS/32WS/32MD/32WD/32XD	(Japan) Rin Iwanaga (Japan) Kie Nakanishi	(Thailand) Laksika Kanlaha (Thailand) Phataimas Muenwong
25–30 June	U.S. Open (Draw): Host: Fort Worth, United States; Venue: Fort Worth Convention Center; Level: Super 300; Prize: $210,000; Format: 32MS/32WS/32MD/32WD/32XD	Score: 21–19, 21–15	
25–30 June	U.S. Open (Draw): Host: Fort Worth, United States; Venue: Fort Worth Convention Center; Level: Super 300; Prize: $210,000; Format: 32MS/32WS/32MD/32WD/32XD	(Thailand) Pakkapon Teeraratsakul (Thailand) Phataimas Muenwong	(Denmark) Jesper Toft (Denmark) Amalie Magelund
25–30 June	U.S. Open (Draw): Host: Fort Worth, United States; Venue: Fort Worth Convention Center; Level: Super 300; Prize: $210,000; Format: 32MS/32WS/32MD/32WD/32XD	Score: 15–21, 21–19, 21–13	

=== July ===
Date	Tournament	Champions	Runners-up
2–7 July	Canada Open (Draw): Host: Calgary, Canada; Venue: Markin MacPhail Centre; Level: Super 500; Prize: $420,000; Format: 32MS/32WS/32MD/32WD/32XD	(Japan) Koki Watanabe	(France) Alex Lanier
2–7 July	Canada Open (Draw): Host: Calgary, Canada; Venue: Markin MacPhail Centre; Level: Super 500; Prize: $420,000; Format: 32MS/32WS/32MD/32WD/32XD	Score: 20–22, 21–17, 21–6	
2–7 July	Canada Open (Draw): Host: Calgary, Canada; Venue: Markin MacPhail Centre; Level: Super 500; Prize: $420,000; Format: 32MS/32WS/32MD/32WD/32XD	(Thailand) Busanan Ongbamrungphan	(Denmark) Line Kjærsfeldt
2–7 July	Canada Open (Draw): Host: Calgary, Canada; Venue: Markin MacPhail Centre; Level: Super 500; Prize: $420,000; Format: 32MS/32WS/32MD/32WD/32XD	Score: 21–16, 21–14	
2–7 July	Canada Open (Draw): Host: Calgary, Canada; Venue: Markin MacPhail Centre; Level: Super 500; Prize: $420,000; Format: 32MS/32WS/32MD/32WD/32XD	(Denmark) Kim Astrup (Denmark) Anders Skaarup Rasmussen	(England) Ben Lane (England) Sean Vendy
2–7 July	Canada Open (Draw): Host: Calgary, Canada; Venue: Markin MacPhail Centre; Level: Super 500; Prize: $420,000; Format: 32MS/32WS/32MD/32WD/32XD	Score: 18–21, 21–14, 21–11	
2–7 July	Canada Open (Draw): Host: Calgary, Canada; Venue: Markin MacPhail Centre; Level: Super 500; Prize: $420,000; Format: 32MS/32WS/32MD/32WD/32XD	(Japan) Rin Iwanaga (Japan) Kie Nakanishi	(Chinese Taipei) Hsu Yin-hui (Chinese Taipei) Lin Jhih-yun
2–7 July	Canada Open (Draw): Host: Calgary, Canada; Venue: Markin MacPhail Centre; Level: Super 500; Prize: $420,000; Format: 32MS/32WS/32MD/32WD/32XD	Score: 21–13, 21–13	
2–7 July	Canada Open (Draw): Host: Calgary, Canada; Venue: Markin MacPhail Centre; Level: Super 500; Prize: $420,000; Format: 32MS/32WS/32MD/32WD/32XD	(Denmark) Jesper Toft (Denmark) Amalie Magelund	(Denmark) Mathias Christiansen (Denmark) Alexandra Bøje
2–7 July	Canada Open (Draw): Host: Calgary, Canada; Venue: Markin MacPhail Centre; Level: Super 500; Prize: $420,000; Format: 32MS/32WS/32MD/32WD/32XD	Score: 9–21, 24–22, 21–12	

=== August ===
Date	Tournament	Champions	Runners-up
6–11 August	Baoji China Masters (Draw): Host: Baoji, China; Venue: Baoji City Gymnasium; Level: Super 100; Prize: $100,000; Format: 48MS/32WS/32MD/32WD/32XD	(China) Hu Zhean	(China) Wang Zhengxing
6–11 August	Baoji China Masters (Draw): Host: Baoji, China; Venue: Baoji City Gymnasium; Level: Super 100; Prize: $100,000; Format: 48MS/32WS/32MD/32WD/32XD	Score: 21–18, 11–21, 21–14	
6–11 August	Baoji China Masters (Draw): Host: Baoji, China; Venue: Baoji City Gymnasium; Level: Super 100; Prize: $100,000; Format: 48MS/32WS/32MD/32WD/32XD	(China) Han Qianxi	(China) Dai Wang
6–11 August	Baoji China Masters (Draw): Host: Baoji, China; Venue: Baoji City Gymnasium; Level: Super 100; Prize: $100,000; Format: 48MS/32WS/32MD/32WD/32XD	Score: 21–23, 21–18, 22–20	
6–11 August	Baoji China Masters (Draw): Host: Baoji, China; Venue: Baoji City Gymnasium; Level: Super 100; Prize: $100,000; Format: 48MS/32WS/32MD/32WD/32XD	(China) Huang Di (China) Liu Yang	(China) Ma Shang (China) Zhu Haiyuan
6–11 August	Baoji China Masters (Draw): Host: Baoji, China; Venue: Baoji City Gymnasium; Level: Super 100; Prize: $100,000; Format: 48MS/32WS/32MD/32WD/32XD	Score: 21–17, 21–16	
6–11 August	Baoji China Masters (Draw): Host: Baoji, China; Venue: Baoji City Gymnasium; Level: Super 100; Prize: $100,000; Format: 48MS/32WS/32MD/32WD/32XD	(China) Chen Xiaofei (China) Feng Xueying	(China) Bao Lijing (China) Tang Ruizhi
6–11 August	Baoji China Masters (Draw): Host: Baoji, China; Venue: Baoji City Gymnasium; Level: Super 100; Prize: $100,000; Format: 48MS/32WS/32MD/32WD/32XD	Score: 21–15, 21–14	
6–11 August	Baoji China Masters (Draw): Host: Baoji, China; Venue: Baoji City Gymnasium; Level: Super 100; Prize: $100,000; Format: 48MS/32WS/32MD/32WD/32XD	(China) Zhang Hanyu (China) Bao Lijing	(China) Zhu Yijun (China) Li Huazhou
6–11 August	Baoji China Masters (Draw): Host: Baoji, China; Venue: Baoji City Gymnasium; Level: Super 100; Prize: $100,000; Format: 48MS/32WS/32MD/32WD/32XD	Score: 21–16, 19–21, 21–17	
20–25 August	Japan Open (Draw): Host: Yokohama, Japan; Venue: Yokohama Arena; Level: Super 750; Prize: $850,000; Format: 32MS/32WS/32MD/32WD/32XD	(France) Alex Lanier	(Chinese Taipei) Chou Tien-chen
20–25 August	Japan Open (Draw): Host: Yokohama, Japan; Venue: Yokohama Arena; Level: Super 750; Prize: $850,000; Format: 32MS/32WS/32MD/32WD/32XD	Score: 21–17, 22–20	
20–25 August	Japan Open (Draw): Host: Yokohama, Japan; Venue: Yokohama Arena; Level: Super 750; Prize: $850,000; Format: 32MS/32WS/32MD/32WD/32XD	(Japan) Akane Yamaguchi	(Thailand) Busanan Ongbamrungphan
20–25 August	Japan Open (Draw): Host: Yokohama, Japan; Venue: Yokohama Arena; Level: Super 750; Prize: $850,000; Format: 32MS/32WS/32MD/32WD/32XD	Score: 21–11, 21–10	
20–25 August	Japan Open (Draw): Host: Yokohama, Japan; Venue: Yokohama Arena; Level: Super 750; Prize: $850,000; Format: 32MS/32WS/32MD/32WD/32XD	(Malaysia) Goh Sze Fei (Malaysia) Nur Izzudin	(South Korea) Kang Min-hyuk (South Korea) Seo Seung-jae
20–25 August	Japan Open (Draw): Host: Yokohama, Japan; Venue: Yokohama Arena; Level: Super 750; Prize: $850,000; Format: 32MS/32WS/32MD/32WD/32XD	Score: 21–19, 21–15	
20–25 August	Japan Open (Draw): Host: Yokohama, Japan; Venue: Yokohama Arena; Level: Super 750; Prize: $850,000; Format: 32MS/32WS/32MD/32WD/32XD	(China) Liu Shengshu (China) Tan Ning	(South Korea) Baek Ha-na (South Korea) Lee So-hee
20–25 August	Japan Open (Draw): Host: Yokohama, Japan; Venue: Yokohama Arena; Level: Super 750; Prize: $850,000; Format: 32MS/32WS/32MD/32WD/32XD	Score: 21–18, 22–20	
20–25 August	Japan Open (Draw): Host: Yokohama, Japan; Venue: Yokohama Arena; Level: Super 750; Prize: $850,000; Format: 32MS/32WS/32MD/32WD/32XD	(China) Jiang Zhenbang (China) Wei Yaxin	(Hong Kong) Tang Chun Man (Hong Kong) Tse Ying Suet
20–25 August	Japan Open (Draw): Host: Yokohama, Japan; Venue: Yokohama Arena; Level: Super 750; Prize: $850,000; Format: 32MS/32WS/32MD/32WD/32XD	Score: 21–12, 21–12	
27 August – 1 September	Korea Open (Draw): Host: Mokpo, South Korea; Venue: Mokpo Indoor Stadium; Level: Super 500; Prize: $420,000; Format: 32MS/32WS/32MD/32WD/32XD	(China) Lu Guangzu	(Chinese Taipei) Lee Chia-hao
27 August – 1 September	Korea Open (Draw): Host: Mokpo, South Korea; Venue: Mokpo Indoor Stadium; Level: Super 500; Prize: $420,000; Format: 32MS/32WS/32MD/32WD/32XD	Score: 21–16, 20–22, 21–18	
27 August – 1 September	Korea Open (Draw): Host: Mokpo, South Korea; Venue: Mokpo Indoor Stadium; Level: Super 500; Prize: $420,000; Format: 32MS/32WS/32MD/32WD/32XD	(South Korea) Kim Ga-eun	(China) Wang Zhiyi
27 August – 1 September	Korea Open (Draw): Host: Mokpo, South Korea; Venue: Mokpo Indoor Stadium; Level: Super 500; Prize: $420,000; Format: 32MS/32WS/32MD/32WD/32XD	Score: Walkover	
27 August – 1 September	Korea Open (Draw): Host: Mokpo, South Korea; Venue: Mokpo Indoor Stadium; Level: Super 500; Prize: $420,000; Format: 32MS/32WS/32MD/32WD/32XD	(Indonesia) Leo Rolly Carnando (Indonesia) Bagas Maulana	(South Korea) Kang Min-hyuk (South Korea) Seo Seung-jae
27 August – 1 September	Korea Open (Draw): Host: Mokpo, South Korea; Venue: Mokpo Indoor Stadium; Level: Super 500; Prize: $420,000; Format: 32MS/32WS/32MD/32WD/32XD	Score: 18–21, 21–9, 21–8	
27 August – 1 September	Korea Open (Draw): Host: Mokpo, South Korea; Venue: Mokpo Indoor Stadium; Level: Super 500; Prize: $420,000; Format: 32MS/32WS/32MD/32WD/32XD	(South Korea) Jeong Na-eun (South Korea) Kim Hye-jeong	(Malaysia) Pearly Tan (Malaysia) Thinaah Muralitharan
27 August – 1 September	Korea Open (Draw): Host: Mokpo, South Korea; Venue: Mokpo Indoor Stadium; Level: Super 500; Prize: $420,000; Format: 32MS/32WS/32MD/32WD/32XD	Score: 21–12, 21–11	
27 August – 1 September	Korea Open (Draw): Host: Mokpo, South Korea; Venue: Mokpo Indoor Stadium; Level: Super 500; Prize: $420,000; Format: 32MS/32WS/32MD/32WD/32XD	(Malaysia) Chen Tang Jie (Malaysia) Toh Ee Wei	(China) Guo Xinwa (China) Li Qian
27 August – 1 September	Korea Open (Draw): Host: Mokpo, South Korea; Venue: Mokpo Indoor Stadium; Level: Super 500; Prize: $420,000; Format: 32MS/32WS/32MD/32WD/32XD	Score: 17–21, 21–13, 21–13	
27 August – 1 September	Indonesia Masters Super 100 I (Draw): Host: Pekanbaru, Indonesia; Venue: Gelanggang Remaja Pekanbaru; Level: Super 100; Prize: $100,000; Format: 48MS/32WS/32MD/32WD/32XD	(Indonesia) Zaki Ubaidillah	(Indonesia) Alwi Farhan
27 August – 1 September	Indonesia Masters Super 100 I (Draw): Host: Pekanbaru, Indonesia; Venue: Gelanggang Remaja Pekanbaru; Level: Super 100; Prize: $100,000; Format: 48MS/32WS/32MD/32WD/32XD	Score: 21–16, 21–14	
27 August – 1 September	Indonesia Masters Super 100 I (Draw): Host: Pekanbaru, Indonesia; Venue: Gelanggang Remaja Pekanbaru; Level: Super 100; Prize: $100,000; Format: 48MS/32WS/32MD/32WD/32XD	(Japan) Riko Gunji	(Japan) Hina Akechi
27 August – 1 September	Indonesia Masters Super 100 I (Draw): Host: Pekanbaru, Indonesia; Venue: Gelanggang Remaja Pekanbaru; Level: Super 100; Prize: $100,000; Format: 48MS/32WS/32MD/32WD/32XD	Score: 21–10, 22–20	
27 August – 1 September	Indonesia Masters Super 100 I (Draw): Host: Pekanbaru, Indonesia; Venue: Gelanggang Remaja Pekanbaru; Level: Super 100; Prize: $100,000; Format: 48MS/32WS/32MD/32WD/32XD	(Thailand) Chaloempon Charoenkitamorn (Thailand) Worrapol Thongsa-nga	(Indonesia) Rahmat Hidayat (Indonesia) Yeremia Rambitan
27 August – 1 September	Indonesia Masters Super 100 I (Draw): Host: Pekanbaru, Indonesia; Venue: Gelanggang Remaja Pekanbaru; Level: Super 100; Prize: $100,000; Format: 48MS/32WS/32MD/32WD/32XD	Score: 21–19, 21–15	
27 August – 1 September	Indonesia Masters Super 100 I (Draw): Host: Pekanbaru, Indonesia; Venue: Gelanggang Remaja Pekanbaru; Level: Super 100; Prize: $100,000; Format: 48MS/32WS/32MD/32WD/32XD	(Indonesia) Jesita Putri Miantoro (Indonesia) Febi Setianingrum	(Japan) Mizuki Otake (Japan) Miyu Takahashi
27 August – 1 September	Indonesia Masters Super 100 I (Draw): Host: Pekanbaru, Indonesia; Venue: Gelanggang Remaja Pekanbaru; Level: Super 100; Prize: $100,000; Format: 48MS/32WS/32MD/32WD/32XD	Score: 21–15, 21–13	
27 August – 1 September	Indonesia Masters Super 100 I (Draw): Host: Pekanbaru, Indonesia; Venue: Gelanggang Remaja Pekanbaru; Level: Super 100; Prize: $100,000; Format: 48MS/32WS/32MD/32WD/32XD	(Indonesia) Jafar Hidayatullah (Indonesia) Felisha Pasaribu	(Indonesia) Adnan Maulana (Indonesia) Indah Cahya Sari Jamil
27 August – 1 September	Indonesia Masters Super 100 I (Draw): Host: Pekanbaru, Indonesia; Venue: Gelanggang Remaja Pekanbaru; Level: Super 100; Prize: $100,000; Format: 48MS/32WS/32MD/32WD/32XD	Score: 21–11, 21–19	

=== September ===
Date	Tournament	Champions	Runners-up
3–8 September	Taipei Open (Draw): Host: Taipei, Taiwan; Venue: Taipei Arena; Level: Super 300; Prize: $210,000; Format: 32MS/32WS/32MD/32WD/32XD	(Chinese Taipei) Lin Chun-yi	(Chinese Taipei) Chi Yu-jen
3–8 September	Taipei Open (Draw): Host: Taipei, Taiwan; Venue: Taipei Arena; Level: Super 300; Prize: $210,000; Format: 32MS/32WS/32MD/32WD/32XD	Score: 21–17, 21–13	
3–8 September	Taipei Open (Draw): Host: Taipei, Taiwan; Venue: Taipei Arena; Level: Super 300; Prize: $210,000; Format: 32MS/32WS/32MD/32WD/32XD	(South Korea) Sim Yu-jin	(Indonesia) Putri Kusuma Wardani
3–8 September	Taipei Open (Draw): Host: Taipei, Taiwan; Venue: Taipei Arena; Level: Super 300; Prize: $210,000; Format: 32MS/32WS/32MD/32WD/32XD	Score: 21–17, 21–13	
3–8 September	Taipei Open (Draw): Host: Taipei, Taiwan; Venue: Taipei Arena; Level: Super 300; Prize: $210,000; Format: 32MS/32WS/32MD/32WD/32XD	(Chinese Taipei) Lee Jhe-huei (Chinese Taipei) Yang Po-hsuan	(Chinese Taipei) Chiang Chien-wei (Chinese Taipei) Wu Hsuan-yi
3–8 September	Taipei Open (Draw): Host: Taipei, Taiwan; Venue: Taipei Arena; Level: Super 300; Prize: $210,000; Format: 32MS/32WS/32MD/32WD/32XD	Score: 21–7, 25–23	
3–8 September	Taipei Open (Draw): Host: Taipei, Taiwan; Venue: Taipei Arena; Level: Super 300; Prize: $210,000; Format: 32MS/32WS/32MD/32WD/32XD	(Indonesia) Febriana Dwipuji Kusuma (Indonesia) Amallia Cahaya Pratiwi	(Indonesia) Jesita Putri Miantoro (Indonesia) Febi Setianingrum
3–8 September	Taipei Open (Draw): Host: Taipei, Taiwan; Venue: Taipei Arena; Level: Super 300; Prize: $210,000; Format: 32MS/32WS/32MD/32WD/32XD	Score: 21–15, 21–16	
3–8 September	Taipei Open (Draw): Host: Taipei, Taiwan; Venue: Taipei Arena; Level: Super 300; Prize: $210,000; Format: 32MS/32WS/32MD/32WD/32XD	(Thailand) Pakkapon Teeraratsakul (Thailand) Phataimas Muenwong	(Chinese Taipei) Yang Po-hsuan (Chinese Taipei) Hu Ling-fang
3–8 September	Taipei Open (Draw): Host: Taipei, Taiwan; Venue: Taipei Arena; Level: Super 300; Prize: $210,000; Format: 32MS/32WS/32MD/32WD/32XD	Score: 21–17, 21–19	
10–15 September	Hong Kong Open (Draw): Host: Kowloon, Hong Kong; Venue: Hong Kong Coliseum; Level: Super 500; Prize: $420,000; Format: 32MS/32WS/32MD/32WD/32XD	(Denmark) Viktor Axelsen	(China) Lei Lanxi
10–15 September	Hong Kong Open (Draw): Host: Kowloon, Hong Kong; Venue: Hong Kong Coliseum; Level: Super 500; Prize: $420,000; Format: 32MS/32WS/32MD/32WD/32XD	Score: 21–9, 21–12	
10–15 September	Hong Kong Open (Draw): Host: Kowloon, Hong Kong; Venue: Hong Kong Coliseum; Level: Super 500; Prize: $420,000; Format: 32MS/32WS/32MD/32WD/32XD	(China) Han Yue	(Indonesia) Putri Kusuma Wardani
10–15 September	Hong Kong Open (Draw): Host: Kowloon, Hong Kong; Venue: Hong Kong Coliseum; Level: Super 500; Prize: $420,000; Format: 32MS/32WS/32MD/32WD/32XD	Score: 21–18, 21–7	
10–15 September	Hong Kong Open (Draw): Host: Kowloon, Hong Kong; Venue: Hong Kong Coliseum; Level: Super 500; Prize: $420,000; Format: 32MS/32WS/32MD/32WD/32XD	(South Korea) Kang Min-hyuk (South Korea) Seo Seung-jae	(Indonesia) Sabar Karyaman Gutama (Indonesia) Muhammad Reza Pahlevi Isfahani
10–15 September	Hong Kong Open (Draw): Host: Kowloon, Hong Kong; Venue: Hong Kong Coliseum; Level: Super 500; Prize: $420,000; Format: 32MS/32WS/32MD/32WD/32XD	Score: 21-13, 21–17	
10–15 September	Hong Kong Open (Draw): Host: Kowloon, Hong Kong; Venue: Hong Kong Coliseum; Level: Super 500; Prize: $420,000; Format: 32MS/32WS/32MD/32WD/32XD	(Malaysia) Pearly Tan (Malaysia) Thinaah Muralitharan	(China) Liu Shengshu (China) Tan Ning
10–15 September	Hong Kong Open (Draw): Host: Kowloon, Hong Kong; Venue: Hong Kong Coliseum; Level: Super 500; Prize: $420,000; Format: 32MS/32WS/32MD/32WD/32XD	Score: 21-14, 21–14	
10–15 September	Hong Kong Open (Draw): Host: Kowloon, Hong Kong; Venue: Hong Kong Coliseum; Level: Super 500; Prize: $420,000; Format: 32MS/32WS/32MD/32WD/32XD	(China) Jiang Zhenbang (China) Wei Yaxin	(China) Feng Yanzhe (China) Huang Dongping
10–15 September	Hong Kong Open (Draw): Host: Kowloon, Hong Kong; Venue: Hong Kong Coliseum; Level: Super 500; Prize: $420,000; Format: 32MS/32WS/32MD/32WD/32XD	Score: 21–17, 21–19	
10–15 September	Vietnam Open (Draw): Host: Ho Chi Minh, Vietnam; Venue: Nguyen Du Club; Level: Super 100; Prize: $100,000; Format: 48MS/32WS/32MD/32WD/32XD	(Japan) Shogo Ogawa	(China) Wang Zhengxing
10–15 September	Vietnam Open (Draw): Host: Ho Chi Minh, Vietnam; Venue: Nguyen Du Club; Level: Super 100; Prize: $100,000; Format: 48MS/32WS/32MD/32WD/32XD	Score: 21–19, 22–20	
10–15 September	Vietnam Open (Draw): Host: Ho Chi Minh, Vietnam; Venue: Nguyen Du Club; Level: Super 100; Prize: $100,000; Format: 48MS/32WS/32MD/32WD/32XD	(Vietnam) Nguyễn Thùy Linh	(Japan) Kaoru Sugiyama
10–15 September	Vietnam Open (Draw): Host: Ho Chi Minh, Vietnam; Venue: Nguyen Du Club; Level: Super 100; Prize: $100,000; Format: 48MS/32WS/32MD/32WD/32XD	Score: 21–15, 22–20	
10–15 September	Vietnam Open (Draw): Host: Ho Chi Minh, Vietnam; Venue: Nguyen Du Club; Level: Super 100; Prize: $100,000; Format: 48MS/32WS/32MD/32WD/32XD	(Chinese Taipei) He Zhi-wei (Chinese Taipei) Huang Jui-hsuan	(Indonesia) Raymond Indra (Indonesia) Patra Harapan Rindorindo
10–15 September	Vietnam Open (Draw): Host: Ho Chi Minh, Vietnam; Venue: Nguyen Du Club; Level: Super 100; Prize: $100,000; Format: 48MS/32WS/32MD/32WD/32XD	Score: 16–21, 21–19, 21–18	
10–15 September	Vietnam Open (Draw): Host: Ho Chi Minh, Vietnam; Venue: Nguyen Du Club; Level: Super 100; Prize: $100,000; Format: 48MS/32WS/32MD/32WD/32XD	(Japan) Mizuki Otake (Japan) Miyu Takahashi	(Thailand) Tidapron Kleebyeesun (Thailand) Nattamon Laisuan
10–15 September	Vietnam Open (Draw): Host: Ho Chi Minh, Vietnam; Venue: Nguyen Du Club; Level: Super 100; Prize: $100,000; Format: 48MS/32WS/32MD/32WD/32XD	Score: 19–21, 22–20, 21–7	
10–15 September	Vietnam Open (Draw): Host: Ho Chi Minh, Vietnam; Venue: Nguyen Du Club; Level: Super 100; Prize: $100,000; Format: 48MS/32WS/32MD/32WD/32XD	(Indonesia) Adnan Maulana (Indonesia) Indah Cahya Sari Jamil	(Indonesia) Zaidan Arrafi Awal Nabawi (Indonesia) Jessica Maya Rismawardani
10–15 September	Vietnam Open (Draw): Host: Ho Chi Minh, Vietnam; Venue: Nguyen Du Club; Level: Super 100; Prize: $100,000; Format: 48MS/32WS/32MD/32WD/32XD	Score: 21–15, 21–15	
17–22 September	China Open (Draw): Host: Changzhou, China; Venue: Olympic Sports Center Gymnasium; Level: Super 1000; Prize: $2,000,000; Format: 32MS/32WS/32MD/32WD/32XD	(China) Weng Hongyang	(Japan) Kodai Naraoka
17–22 September	China Open (Draw): Host: Changzhou, China; Venue: Olympic Sports Center Gymnasium; Level: Super 1000; Prize: $2,000,000; Format: 32MS/32WS/32MD/32WD/32XD	Score: 21–17, 21–12	
17–22 September	China Open (Draw): Host: Changzhou, China; Venue: Olympic Sports Center Gymnasium; Level: Super 1000; Prize: $2,000,000; Format: 32MS/32WS/32MD/32WD/32XD	(China) Wang Zhiyi	(Japan) Tomoka Miyazaki
17–22 September	China Open (Draw): Host: Changzhou, China; Venue: Olympic Sports Center Gymnasium; Level: Super 1000; Prize: $2,000,000; Format: 32MS/32WS/32MD/32WD/32XD	Score: 21–17, 21–15	
17–22 September	China Open (Draw): Host: Changzhou, China; Venue: Olympic Sports Center Gymnasium; Level: Super 1000; Prize: $2,000,000; Format: 32MS/32WS/32MD/32WD/32XD	(Malaysia) Goh Sze Fei (Malaysia) Nur Izzuddin	(China) He Jiting (China) Ren Xiangyu
17–22 September	China Open (Draw): Host: Changzhou, China; Venue: Olympic Sports Center Gymnasium; Level: Super 1000; Prize: $2,000,000; Format: 32MS/32WS/32MD/32WD/32XD	Score: 13–21, 21–12, 21–17	
17–22 September	China Open (Draw): Host: Changzhou, China; Venue: Olympic Sports Center Gymnasium; Level: Super 1000; Prize: $2,000,000; Format: 32MS/32WS/32MD/32WD/32XD	(China) Li Yijing (China) Luo Xumin	(China) Li Wenmei (China) Zhang Shuxian
17–22 September	China Open (Draw): Host: Changzhou, China; Venue: Olympic Sports Center Gymnasium; Level: Super 1000; Prize: $2,000,000; Format: 32MS/32WS/32MD/32WD/32XD	Score: 11–21, 21–18, 21–8	
17–22 September	China Open (Draw): Host: Changzhou, China; Venue: Olympic Sports Center Gymnasium; Level: Super 1000; Prize: $2,000,000; Format: 32MS/32WS/32MD/32WD/32XD	(China) Feng Yanzhe (China) Huang Dongping	(Malaysia) Goh Soon Huat (Malaysia) Shevon Jemie Lai
17–22 September	China Open (Draw): Host: Changzhou, China; Venue: Olympic Sports Center Gymnasium; Level: Super 1000; Prize: $2,000,000; Format: 32MS/32WS/32MD/32WD/32XD	Score: 16–21, 21–14, 21–17	
24–29 September	Macau Open (Draw): Host: Macau; Venue: Macao East Asian Games Dome; Level: Super 300; Prize: $210,000; Format: 32MS/32WS/32MD/32WD/32XD	(Hong Kong) Ng Ka Long	(Singapore) Jason Teh
24–29 September	Macau Open (Draw): Host: Macau; Venue: Macao East Asian Games Dome; Level: Super 300; Prize: $210,000; Format: 32MS/32WS/32MD/32WD/32XD	Score: 21–19, 21–17	
24–29 September	Macau Open (Draw): Host: Macau; Venue: Macao East Asian Games Dome; Level: Super 300; Prize: $210,000; Format: 32MS/32WS/32MD/32WD/32XD	(China) Gao Fangjie	(Chinese Taipei) Lin Hsiang-ti
24–29 September	Macau Open (Draw): Host: Macau; Venue: Macao East Asian Games Dome; Level: Super 300; Prize: $210,000; Format: 32MS/32WS/32MD/32WD/32XD	Score: 21–23, 21–9, 21–11	
24–29 September	Macau Open (Draw): Host: Macau; Venue: Macao East Asian Games Dome; Level: Super 300; Prize: $210,000; Format: 32MS/32WS/32MD/32WD/32XD	(China) Chen Xujun (China) Liu Yi	(Indonesia) Sabar Karyaman Gutama (Indonesia) Muhammad Reza Pahlevi Isfahani
24–29 September	Macau Open (Draw): Host: Macau; Venue: Macao East Asian Games Dome; Level: Super 300; Prize: $210,000; Format: 32MS/32WS/32MD/32WD/32XD	Score: 21–18, 21–14	
24–29 September	Macau Open (Draw): Host: Macau; Venue: Macao East Asian Games Dome; Level: Super 300; Prize: $210,000; Format: 32MS/32WS/32MD/32WD/32XD	(China) Li Wenmei (China) Zhang Shuxian	(Chinese Taipei) Hsieh Pei-shan (Chinese Taipei) Hung En-tzu
24–29 September	Macau Open (Draw): Host: Macau; Venue: Macao East Asian Games Dome; Level: Super 300; Prize: $210,000; Format: 32MS/32WS/32MD/32WD/32XD	Score: 25–23, 18–21, 22–20	
24–29 September	Macau Open (Draw): Host: Macau; Venue: Macao East Asian Games Dome; Level: Super 300; Prize: $210,000; Format: 32MS/32WS/32MD/32WD/32XD	(China) Guo Xinwa (China) Chen Fanghui	(Indonesia) Dejan Ferdinansyah (Indonesia) Gloria Emanuelle Widjaja
24–29 September	Macau Open (Draw): Host: Macau; Venue: Macao East Asian Games Dome; Level: Super 300; Prize: $210,000; Format: 32MS/32WS/32MD/32WD/32XD	Score: 21–15, 21–18	

=== October ===
Date	Tournament	Champions	Runners-up
1–6 October	Abu Dhabi Masters (cancelled): Host: Abu Dhabi, United Arab Emirates; Venue: TBA; Level: Super 100; Prize: $100,000; Format: 48MS/32WS/32MD/32WD/32XD		
1–6 October	Abu Dhabi Masters (cancelled): Host: Abu Dhabi, United Arab Emirates; Venue: TBA; Level: Super 100; Prize: $100,000; Format: 48MS/32WS/32MD/32WD/32XD	Score:	
1–6 October	Abu Dhabi Masters (cancelled): Host: Abu Dhabi, United Arab Emirates; Venue: TBA; Level: Super 100; Prize: $100,000; Format: 48MS/32WS/32MD/32WD/32XD	Score:	
1–6 October	Abu Dhabi Masters (cancelled): Host: Abu Dhabi, United Arab Emirates; Venue: TBA; Level: Super 100; Prize: $100,000; Format: 48MS/32WS/32MD/32WD/32XD	Score:	
1–6 October	Abu Dhabi Masters (cancelled): Host: Abu Dhabi, United Arab Emirates; Venue: TBA; Level: Super 100; Prize: $100,000; Format: 48MS/32WS/32MD/32WD/32XD	Score:	
1–6 October	Abu Dhabi Masters (cancelled): Host: Abu Dhabi, United Arab Emirates; Venue: TBA; Level: Super 100; Prize: $100,000; Format: 48MS/32WS/32MD/32WD/32XD	Score:	
8–13 October	Arctic Open (Draw): Host: Vantaa, Finland; Venue: Energia Areena; Level: Super 500; Prize: $420,000; Format: 32MS/32WS/32MD/32WD/32XD	(Chinese Taipei) Chou Tien-chen	(Indonesia) Jonatan Christie
8–13 October	Arctic Open (Draw): Host: Vantaa, Finland; Venue: Energia Areena; Level: Super 500; Prize: $420,000; Format: 32MS/32WS/32MD/32WD/32XD	Score: 21–18, 21–17	
8–13 October	Arctic Open (Draw): Host: Vantaa, Finland; Venue: Energia Areena; Level: Super 500; Prize: $420,000; Format: 32MS/32WS/32MD/32WD/32XD	(China) Han Yue	(Thailand) Ratchanok Intanon
8–13 October	Arctic Open (Draw): Host: Vantaa, Finland; Venue: Energia Areena; Level: Super 500; Prize: $420,000; Format: 32MS/32WS/32MD/32WD/32XD	Score: 21–10, 21–13	
8–13 October	Arctic Open (Draw): Host: Vantaa, Finland; Venue: Energia Areena; Level: Super 500; Prize: $420,000; Format: 32MS/32WS/32MD/32WD/32XD	(Malaysia) Goh Sze Fei (Malaysia) Nur Izzuddin	(Denmark) Kim Astrup (Denmark) Anders Skaarup Rasmussen
8–13 October	Arctic Open (Draw): Host: Vantaa, Finland; Venue: Energia Areena; Level: Super 500; Prize: $420,000; Format: 32MS/32WS/32MD/32WD/32XD	Score: 15–21, 21–15, 21–19	
8–13 October	Arctic Open (Draw): Host: Vantaa, Finland; Venue: Energia Areena; Level: Super 500; Prize: $420,000; Format: 32MS/32WS/32MD/32WD/32XD	(China) Liu Shengshu (China) Tan Ning	(Malaysia) Pearly Tan (Malaysia) Thinaah Muralitharan
8–13 October	Arctic Open (Draw): Host: Vantaa, Finland; Venue: Energia Areena; Level: Super 500; Prize: $420,000; Format: 32MS/32WS/32MD/32WD/32XD	Score: 21–12, 21–17	
8–13 October	Arctic Open (Draw): Host: Vantaa, Finland; Venue: Energia Areena; Level: Super 500; Prize: $420,000; Format: 32MS/32WS/32MD/32WD/32XD	(China) Feng Yanzhe (China) Huang Dongping	(China) Jiang Zhenbang (China) Wei Yaxin
8–13 October	Arctic Open (Draw): Host: Vantaa, Finland; Venue: Energia Areena; Level: Super 500; Prize: $420,000; Format: 32MS/32WS/32MD/32WD/32XD	Score: 21–18, 6–21, 21–15	
15–20 October	Denmark Open (Draw): Host: Odense, Denmark; Venue: Jyske Bank Arena; Level: Super 750; Prize: $850,000; Format: 32MS/32WS/32MD/32WD/32XD	(Denmark) Anders Antonsen	(Japan) Koki Watanabe
15–20 October	Denmark Open (Draw): Host: Odense, Denmark; Venue: Jyske Bank Arena; Level: Super 750; Prize: $850,000; Format: 32MS/32WS/32MD/32WD/32XD	Score: 21–15, 21–16	
15–20 October	Denmark Open (Draw): Host: Odense, Denmark; Venue: Jyske Bank Arena; Level: Super 750; Prize: $850,000; Format: 32MS/32WS/32MD/32WD/32XD	(China) Wang Zhiyi	(South Korea) An Se-young
15–20 October	Denmark Open (Draw): Host: Odense, Denmark; Venue: Jyske Bank Arena; Level: Super 750; Prize: $850,000; Format: 32MS/32WS/32MD/32WD/32XD	Score: 21–10, 21–12	
15–20 October	Denmark Open (Draw): Host: Odense, Denmark; Venue: Jyske Bank Arena; Level: Super 750; Prize: $850,000; Format: 32MS/32WS/32MD/32WD/32XD	(China) Liang Weikeng (China) Wang Chang	(Denmark) Kim Astrup (Denmark) Anders Skaarup Rasmussen
15–20 October	Denmark Open (Draw): Host: Odense, Denmark; Venue: Jyske Bank Arena; Level: Super 750; Prize: $850,000; Format: 32MS/32WS/32MD/32WD/32XD	Score: 21–18, 21–17	
15–20 October	Denmark Open (Draw): Host: Odense, Denmark; Venue: Jyske Bank Arena; Level: Super 750; Prize: $850,000; Format: 32MS/32WS/32MD/32WD/32XD	(Japan) Rin Iwanaga (Japan) Kie Nakanishi	(China) Liu Shengshu (China) Tan Ning
15–20 October	Denmark Open (Draw): Host: Odense, Denmark; Venue: Jyske Bank Arena; Level: Super 750; Prize: $850,000; Format: 32MS/32WS/32MD/32WD/32XD	Score: 21–18, 21–14	
15–20 October	Denmark Open (Draw): Host: Odense, Denmark; Venue: Jyske Bank Arena; Level: Super 750; Prize: $850,000; Format: 32MS/32WS/32MD/32WD/32XD	(China) Feng Yanzhe (China) Huang Dongping	(China) Jiang Zhenbang (China) Wei Yaxin
15–20 October	Denmark Open (Draw): Host: Odense, Denmark; Venue: Jyske Bank Arena; Level: Super 750; Prize: $850,000; Format: 32MS/32WS/32MD/32WD/32XD	Score: 15–21, 21–18, 21–17	
15–20 October	Malaysia Super 100 (Draw): Host: Kuala Lumpur, Malaysia; Venue: Stadium Juara; Level: Super 100; Prize: $100,000; Format: 48MS/32WS/32MD/32WD/32XD	(Chinese Taipei) Chi Yu-jen	(Singapore) Jason Teh
15–20 October	Malaysia Super 100 (Draw): Host: Kuala Lumpur, Malaysia; Venue: Stadium Juara; Level: Super 100; Prize: $100,000; Format: 48MS/32WS/32MD/32WD/32XD	Score: 21–12, 21–23, 21–15	
15–20 October	Malaysia Super 100 (Draw): Host: Kuala Lumpur, Malaysia; Venue: Stadium Juara; Level: Super 100; Prize: $100,000; Format: 48MS/32WS/32MD/32WD/32XD	(Japan) Kaoru Sugiyama	(Japan) Manami Suizu
15–20 October	Malaysia Super 100 (Draw): Host: Kuala Lumpur, Malaysia; Venue: Stadium Juara; Level: Super 100; Prize: $100,000; Format: 48MS/32WS/32MD/32WD/32XD	Score: 21–18, 21–14	
15–20 October	Malaysia Super 100 (Draw): Host: Kuala Lumpur, Malaysia; Venue: Stadium Juara; Level: Super 100; Prize: $100,000; Format: 48MS/32WS/32MD/32WD/32XD	(Malaysia) Low Hang Yee (Malaysia) Ng Eng Cheong	(United States) Chen Zhi-yi (United States) Presley Smith
15–20 October	Malaysia Super 100 (Draw): Host: Kuala Lumpur, Malaysia; Venue: Stadium Juara; Level: Super 100; Prize: $100,000; Format: 48MS/32WS/32MD/32WD/32XD	Score: 19–21, 21–15, 21–12	
15–20 October	Malaysia Super 100 (Draw): Host: Kuala Lumpur, Malaysia; Venue: Stadium Juara; Level: Super 100; Prize: $100,000; Format: 48MS/32WS/32MD/32WD/32XD	(Malaysia) Go Pei Kee (Malaysia) Teoh Mei Xing	(Chinese Taipei) Nicole Gonzales Chan (Chinese Taipei) Yang Chu-yun
15–20 October	Malaysia Super 100 (Draw): Host: Kuala Lumpur, Malaysia; Venue: Stadium Juara; Level: Super 100; Prize: $100,000; Format: 48MS/32WS/32MD/32WD/32XD	Score: 22–20, 21–11	
15–20 October	Malaysia Super 100 (Draw): Host: Kuala Lumpur, Malaysia; Venue: Stadium Juara; Level: Super 100; Prize: $100,000; Format: 48MS/32WS/32MD/32WD/32XD	(Chinese Taipei) Ye Hong-wei (Chinese Taipei) Nicole Gonzales Chan	(Japan) Yuichi Shimogami (Japan) Sayaka Hobara
15–20 October	Malaysia Super 100 (Draw): Host: Kuala Lumpur, Malaysia; Venue: Stadium Juara; Level: Super 100; Prize: $100,000; Format: 48MS/32WS/32MD/32WD/32XD	Score: 21–19, 12–21, 22–20	
29 October – 3 November	Hylo Open (Draw): Host: Saarbrücken, Germany; Venue: Saarlandhalle; Level: Super 300; Prize: $210,000; Format: 32MS/32WS/32MD/32WD/32XD	(France) Christo Popov	(France) Toma Junior Popov
29 October – 3 November	Hylo Open (Draw): Host: Saarbrücken, Germany; Venue: Saarlandhalle; Level: Super 300; Prize: $210,000; Format: 32MS/32WS/32MD/32WD/32XD	Score: 21–13, 21–10	
29 October – 3 November	Hylo Open (Draw): Host: Saarbrücken, Germany; Venue: Saarlandhalle; Level: Super 300; Prize: $210,000; Format: 32MS/32WS/32MD/32WD/32XD	(Denmark) Mia Blichfeldt	(India) Malvika Bansod
29 October – 3 November	Hylo Open (Draw): Host: Saarbrücken, Germany; Venue: Saarlandhalle; Level: Super 300; Prize: $210,000; Format: 32MS/32WS/32MD/32WD/32XD	Score: 21–10, 21–15	
29 October – 3 November	Hylo Open (Draw): Host: Saarbrücken, Germany; Venue: Saarlandhalle; Level: Super 300; Prize: $210,000; Format: 32MS/32WS/32MD/32WD/32XD	(England) Ben Lane (England) Sean Vendy	(Denmark) Rasmus Kjær (Denmark) Frederik Søgaard
29 October – 3 November	Hylo Open (Draw): Host: Saarbrücken, Germany; Venue: Saarlandhalle; Level: Super 300; Prize: $210,000; Format: 32MS/32WS/32MD/32WD/32XD	Score: 18–21, 21–15, 21–18	
29 October – 3 November	Hylo Open (Draw): Host: Saarbrücken, Germany; Venue: Saarlandhalle; Level: Super 300; Prize: $210,000; Format: 32MS/32WS/32MD/32WD/32XD	(Chinese Taipei) Sung Shuo-yun (Chinese Taipei) Yu Chien-hui	(Ukraine) Polina Buhrova (Ukraine) Yevheniia Kantemyr
29 October – 3 November	Hylo Open (Draw): Host: Saarbrücken, Germany; Venue: Saarlandhalle; Level: Super 300; Prize: $210,000; Format: 32MS/32WS/32MD/32WD/32XD	Score: 21–16, 21–14	
29 October – 3 November	Hylo Open (Draw): Host: Saarbrücken, Germany; Venue: Saarlandhalle; Level: Super 300; Prize: $210,000; Format: 32MS/32WS/32MD/32WD/32XD	(Denmark) Jesper Toft (Denmark) Amalie Magelund	(Scotland) Alexander Dunn (Scotland) Julie MacPherson
29 October – 3 November	Hylo Open (Draw): Host: Saarbrücken, Germany; Venue: Saarlandhalle; Level: Super 300; Prize: $210,000; Format: 32MS/32WS/32MD/32WD/32XD	Score: 21–19, 21–16	
29 October – 3 November	Indonesia Masters Super 100 II (Draw): Host: Surabaya, Indonesia; Venue: Jatim International Expo Convention Exhibition; Level: Super 100; Prize: $100,000; Format: 48MS/32WS/32MD/32WD/32XD	(Indonesia) Alwi Farhan	(Malaysia) Aidil Sholeh
29 October – 3 November	Indonesia Masters Super 100 II (Draw): Host: Surabaya, Indonesia; Venue: Jatim International Expo Convention Exhibition; Level: Super 100; Prize: $100,000; Format: 48MS/32WS/32MD/32WD/32XD	Score: 21–10, 21–9	
29 October – 3 November	Indonesia Masters Super 100 II (Draw): Host: Surabaya, Indonesia; Venue: Jatim International Expo Convention Exhibition; Level: Super 100; Prize: $100,000; Format: 48MS/32WS/32MD/32WD/32XD	(Indonesia) Ni Kadek Dhinda Amartya Pratiwi	(Malaysia) Karupathevan Letshanaa
29 October – 3 November	Indonesia Masters Super 100 II (Draw): Host: Surabaya, Indonesia; Venue: Jatim International Expo Convention Exhibition; Level: Super 100; Prize: $100,000; Format: 48MS/32WS/32MD/32WD/32XD	Score: 21–19, 21–17	
29 October – 3 November	Indonesia Masters Super 100 II (Draw): Host: Surabaya, Indonesia; Venue: Jatim International Expo Convention Exhibition; Level: Super 100; Prize: $100,000; Format: 48MS/32WS/32MD/32WD/32XD	(Indonesia) Rahmat Hidayat (Indonesia) Yeremia Rambitan	(Indonesia) Raymond Indra (Indonesia) Patra Harapan Rindorindo
29 October – 3 November	Indonesia Masters Super 100 II (Draw): Host: Surabaya, Indonesia; Venue: Jatim International Expo Convention Exhibition; Level: Super 100; Prize: $100,000; Format: 48MS/32WS/32MD/32WD/32XD	Score: 23–21, 21–18	
29 October – 3 November	Indonesia Masters Super 100 II (Draw): Host: Surabaya, Indonesia; Venue: Jatim International Expo Convention Exhibition; Level: Super 100; Prize: $100,000; Format: 48MS/32WS/32MD/32WD/32XD	(Chinese Taipei) Hsieh Pei-shan (Chinese Taipei) Hung En-tzu	(Indonesia) Lanny Tria Mayasari (Indonesia) Siti Fadia Silva Ramadhanti
29 October – 3 November	Indonesia Masters Super 100 II (Draw): Host: Surabaya, Indonesia; Venue: Jatim International Expo Convention Exhibition; Level: Super 100; Prize: $100,000; Format: 48MS/32WS/32MD/32WD/32XD	Score: 21–19, 21–15	
29 October – 3 November	Indonesia Masters Super 100 II (Draw): Host: Surabaya, Indonesia; Venue: Jatim International Expo Convention Exhibition; Level: Super 100; Prize: $100,000; Format: 48MS/32WS/32MD/32WD/32XD	(Indonesia) Amri Syahnawi (Indonesia) Nita Violina Marwah	(Indonesia) Marwan Faza (Indonesia) Aisyah Salsabila Putri Pranata
29 October – 3 November	Indonesia Masters Super 100 II (Draw): Host: Surabaya, Indonesia; Venue: Jatim International Expo Convention Exhibition; Level: Super 100; Prize: $100,000; Format: 48MS/32WS/32MD/32WD/32XD	Score: 22–20, 21–13	

=== November ===
Date	Tournament	Champions	Runners-up
5–10 November	Korea Masters (Draw): Host: Iksan, South Korea; Venue: Iksan Gymnasium; Level: Super 300; Prize: $210,000; Format: 32MS/32WS/32MD/32WD/32XD	(Thailand) Kunlavut Vitidsarn	(China) Wang Zhengxing
5–10 November	Korea Masters (Draw): Host: Iksan, South Korea; Venue: Iksan Gymnasium; Level: Super 300; Prize: $210,000; Format: 32MS/32WS/32MD/32WD/32XD	Score: 21–18, 21–18	
5–10 November	Korea Masters (Draw): Host: Iksan, South Korea; Venue: Iksan Gymnasium; Level: Super 300; Prize: $210,000; Format: 32MS/32WS/32MD/32WD/32XD	(Indonesia) Putri Kusuma Wardani	(China) Han Qianxi
5–10 November	Korea Masters (Draw): Host: Iksan, South Korea; Venue: Iksan Gymnasium; Level: Super 300; Prize: $210,000; Format: 32MS/32WS/32MD/32WD/32XD	Score: 21–14, 21–14	
5–10 November	Korea Masters (Draw): Host: Iksan, South Korea; Venue: Iksan Gymnasium; Level: Super 300; Prize: $210,000; Format: 32MS/32WS/32MD/32WD/32XD	(Malaysia) Aaron Chia (Malaysia) Soh Wooi Yik	(South Korea) Jin Yong (South Korea) Kim Won-ho
5–10 November	Korea Masters (Draw): Host: Iksan, South Korea; Venue: Iksan Gymnasium; Level: Super 300; Prize: $210,000; Format: 32MS/32WS/32MD/32WD/32XD	Score: 21–23, 21–19, 21–14	
5–10 November	Korea Masters (Draw): Host: Iksan, South Korea; Venue: Iksan Gymnasium; Level: Super 300; Prize: $210,000; Format: 32MS/32WS/32MD/32WD/32XD	(South Korea) Kim Hye-jeong (South Korea) Kong Hee-yong	(China) Li Yijing (China) Luo Xumin
5–10 November	Korea Masters (Draw): Host: Iksan, South Korea; Venue: Iksan Gymnasium; Level: Super 300; Prize: $210,000; Format: 32MS/32WS/32MD/32WD/32XD	Score: 21–14, 16–21, 21–18	
5–10 November	Korea Masters (Draw): Host: Iksan, South Korea; Venue: Iksan Gymnasium; Level: Super 300; Prize: $210,000; Format: 32MS/32WS/32MD/32WD/32XD	(China) Guo Xinwa (China) Chen Fanghui	(Indonesia) Dejan Ferdinansyah (Indonesia) Gloria Emanuelle Widjaja
5–10 November	Korea Masters (Draw): Host: Iksan, South Korea; Venue: Iksan Gymnasium; Level: Super 300; Prize: $210,000; Format: 32MS/32WS/32MD/32WD/32XD	Score: 21–10, 21–12	
12–17 November	Japan Masters (Draw): Host: Kumamoto, Japan; Venue: Kumamoto Prefectural Gymnasium; Level: Super 500; Prize: $420,000; Format: 32MS/32WS/32MD/32WD/32XD	(China) Li Shifeng	(Malaysia) Leong Jun Hao
12–17 November	Japan Masters (Draw): Host: Kumamoto, Japan; Venue: Kumamoto Prefectural Gymnasium; Level: Super 500; Prize: $420,000; Format: 32MS/32WS/32MD/32WD/32XD	Score: 21–10, 21–13	
12–17 November	Japan Masters (Draw): Host: Kumamoto, Japan; Venue: Kumamoto Prefectural Gymnasium; Level: Super 500; Prize: $420,000; Format: 32MS/32WS/32MD/32WD/32XD	(Japan) Akane Yamaguchi	(Indonesia) Gregoria Mariska Tunjung
12–17 November	Japan Masters (Draw): Host: Kumamoto, Japan; Venue: Kumamoto Prefectural Gymnasium; Level: Super 500; Prize: $420,000; Format: 32MS/32WS/32MD/32WD/32XD	Score: 31–12, 21–12	
12–17 November	Japan Masters (Draw): Host: Kumamoto, Japan; Venue: Kumamoto Prefectural Gymnasium; Level: Super 500; Prize: $420,000; Format: 32MS/32WS/32MD/32WD/32XD	(Indonesia) Fajar Alfian (Indonesia) Muhammad Rian Ardianto	(Japan) Takuro Hoki (Japan) Yugo Kobayashi
12–17 November	Japan Masters (Draw): Host: Kumamoto, Japan; Venue: Kumamoto Prefectural Gymnasium; Level: Super 500; Prize: $420,000; Format: 32MS/32WS/32MD/32WD/32XD	Score: 21–15, 17–21, 21–17	
12–17 November	Japan Masters (Draw): Host: Kumamoto, Japan; Venue: Kumamoto Prefectural Gymnasium; Level: Super 500; Prize: $420,000; Format: 32MS/32WS/32MD/32WD/32XD	(China) Liu Shengshu (China) Tan Ning	(Japan) Yuki Fukushima (Japan) Mayu Matsumoto
12–17 November	Japan Masters (Draw): Host: Kumamoto, Japan; Venue: Kumamoto Prefectural Gymnasium; Level: Super 500; Prize: $420,000; Format: 32MS/32WS/32MD/32WD/32XD	Score: 21–15, 21–5	
12–17 November	Japan Masters (Draw): Host: Kumamoto, Japan; Venue: Kumamoto Prefectural Gymnasium; Level: Super 500; Prize: $420,000; Format: 32MS/32WS/32MD/32WD/32XD	(Thailand) Dechapol Puavaranukroh (Thailand) Supissara Paewsampran	(France) Thom Gicquel (France) Delphine Delrue
12–17 November	Japan Masters (Draw): Host: Kumamoto, Japan; Venue: Kumamoto Prefectural Gymnasium; Level: Super 500; Prize: $420,000; Format: 32MS/32WS/32MD/32WD/32XD	Score: 21–16, 10–21, 21–17	
19–24 November	China Masters (Draw): Host: Shenzhen, China; Venue: Shenzhen Arena; Level: Super 750; Prize: $1,150,000; Format: 32MS/32WS/32MD/32WD/32XD	(Denmark) Anders Antonsen	(Indonesia) Jonatan Christie
19–24 November	China Masters (Draw): Host: Shenzhen, China; Venue: Shenzhen Arena; Level: Super 750; Prize: $1,150,000; Format: 32MS/32WS/32MD/32WD/32XD	Score: 21–15, 21–13	
19–24 November	China Masters (Draw): Host: Shenzhen, China; Venue: Shenzhen Arena; Level: Super 750; Prize: $1,150,000; Format: 32MS/32WS/32MD/32WD/32XD	(South Korea) An Se-young	(China) Gao Fangjie
19–24 November	China Masters (Draw): Host: Shenzhen, China; Venue: Shenzhen Arena; Level: Super 750; Prize: $1,150,000; Format: 32MS/32WS/32MD/32WD/32XD	Score: 21–12, 21–8	
19–24 November	China Masters (Draw): Host: Shenzhen, China; Venue: Shenzhen Arena; Level: Super 750; Prize: $1,150,000; Format: 32MS/32WS/32MD/32WD/32XD	(South Korea) Jin Yong (South Korea) Seo Seung-jae	(Indonesia) Sabar Karyaman Gutama (Indonesia) Muhammad Reza Pahlevi Isfahani
19–24 November	China Masters (Draw): Host: Shenzhen, China; Venue: Shenzhen Arena; Level: Super 750; Prize: $1,150,000; Format: 32MS/32WS/32MD/32WD/32XD	Score: 21–16, 21–16	
19–24 November	China Masters (Draw): Host: Shenzhen, China; Venue: Shenzhen Arena; Level: Super 750; Prize: $1,150,000; Format: 32MS/32WS/32MD/32WD/32XD	(China) Liu Shengshu (China) Tan Ning	(China) Li Yijing (China) Luo Xumin
19–24 November	China Masters (Draw): Host: Shenzhen, China; Venue: Shenzhen Arena; Level: Super 750; Prize: $1,150,000; Format: 32MS/32WS/32MD/32WD/32XD	Score: 21–10, 21–10	
19–24 November	China Masters (Draw): Host: Shenzhen, China; Venue: Shenzhen Arena; Level: Super 750; Prize: $1,150,000; Format: 32MS/32WS/32MD/32WD/32XD	(China) Feng Yanzhe (China) Huang Dongping	(Malaysia) Hoo Pang Ron (Malaysia) Cheng Su Yin
19–24 November	China Masters (Draw): Host: Shenzhen, China; Venue: Shenzhen Arena; Level: Super 750; Prize: $1,150,000; Format: 32MS/32WS/32MD/32WD/32XD	Score: 21–23, 25–23, 21–16	
26 November – 1 December	Syed Modi International (Draw): Host: Lucknow, India; Venue: Babu Banarasi Das Indoor Stadium; Level: Super 300; Prize: $210,000; Format: 32MS/32WS/32MD/32WD/32XD	(India) Lakshya Sen	(Singapore) Jason Teh
26 November – 1 December	Syed Modi International (Draw): Host: Lucknow, India; Venue: Babu Banarasi Das Indoor Stadium; Level: Super 300; Prize: $210,000; Format: 32MS/32WS/32MD/32WD/32XD	Score: 21–6, 21–7	
26 November – 1 December	Syed Modi International (Draw): Host: Lucknow, India; Venue: Babu Banarasi Das Indoor Stadium; Level: Super 300; Prize: $210,000; Format: 32MS/32WS/32MD/32WD/32XD	(India) P. V. Sindhu	(China) Wu Luoyu
26 November – 1 December	Syed Modi International (Draw): Host: Lucknow, India; Venue: Babu Banarasi Das Indoor Stadium; Level: Super 300; Prize: $210,000; Format: 32MS/32WS/32MD/32WD/32XD	Score: 21–14, 21–16	
26 November – 1 December	Syed Modi International (Draw): Host: Lucknow, India; Venue: Babu Banarasi Das Indoor Stadium; Level: Super 300; Prize: $210,000; Format: 32MS/32WS/32MD/32WD/32XD	(China) Huang Di (China) Liu Yang	(India) Pruthvi Roy (India) K. Sai Pratheek
26 November – 1 December	Syed Modi International (Draw): Host: Lucknow, India; Venue: Babu Banarasi Das Indoor Stadium; Level: Super 300; Prize: $210,000; Format: 32MS/32WS/32MD/32WD/32XD	Score: 21–14, 19–21, 21–17	
26 November – 1 December	Syed Modi International (Draw): Host: Lucknow, India; Venue: Babu Banarasi Das Indoor Stadium; Level: Super 300; Prize: $210,000; Format: 32MS/32WS/32MD/32WD/32XD	(India) Treesa Jolly (India) Gayatri Gopichand	(China) Bao Lijing (China) Li Qian
26 November – 1 December	Syed Modi International (Draw): Host: Lucknow, India; Venue: Babu Banarasi Das Indoor Stadium; Level: Super 300; Prize: $210,000; Format: 32MS/32WS/32MD/32WD/32XD	Score: 21–18, 21–11	
26 November – 1 December	Syed Modi International (Draw): Host: Lucknow, India; Venue: Babu Banarasi Das Indoor Stadium; Level: Super 300; Prize: $210,000; Format: 32MS/32WS/32MD/32WD/32XD	(Thailand) Dechapol Puavaranukroh (Thailand) Supissara Paewsampran	(India) Dhruv Kapila (India) Tanisha Crasto
26 November – 1 December	Syed Modi International (Draw): Host: Lucknow, India; Venue: Babu Banarasi Das Indoor Stadium; Level: Super 300; Prize: $210,000; Format: 32MS/32WS/32MD/32WD/32XD	Score: 18–21, 21–14, 21–8	

=== December ===
Date	Tournament	Champions	Runners-up
3–8 December	Guwahati Masters (Draw): Host: Guwahati, India; Venue: Saru Sajai Indoor Sports Complex; Level: Super 100; Prize: $100,000; Format: 48MS/32WS/32MD/32WD/32XD	(India) Sathish Karunakaran	(China) Zhu Xuanchen
3–8 December	Guwahati Masters (Draw): Host: Guwahati, India; Venue: Saru Sajai Indoor Sports Complex; Level: Super 100; Prize: $100,000; Format: 48MS/32WS/32MD/32WD/32XD	Score: 21–17, 21–14	
3–8 December	Guwahati Masters (Draw): Host: Guwahati, India; Venue: Saru Sajai Indoor Sports Complex; Level: Super 100; Prize: $100,000; Format: 48MS/32WS/32MD/32WD/32XD	(China) Cai Yanyan	(India) Anmol Kharb
3–8 December	Guwahati Masters (Draw): Host: Guwahati, India; Venue: Saru Sajai Indoor Sports Complex; Level: Super 100; Prize: $100,000; Format: 48MS/32WS/32MD/32WD/32XD	Score: 14–21, 21–13, 21–19	
3–8 December	Guwahati Masters (Draw): Host: Guwahati, India; Venue: Saru Sajai Indoor Sports Complex; Level: Super 100; Prize: $100,000; Format: 48MS/32WS/32MD/32WD/32XD	(Malaysia) Chia Wei Jie (Malaysia) Lwi Sheng Hao	(China) Huang Di (China) Liu Yang
3–8 December	Guwahati Masters (Draw): Host: Guwahati, India; Venue: Saru Sajai Indoor Sports Complex; Level: Super 100; Prize: $100,000; Format: 48MS/32WS/32MD/32WD/32XD	Score: 20–22, 21–15, 21–17	
3–8 December	Guwahati Masters (Draw): Host: Guwahati, India; Venue: Saru Sajai Indoor Sports Complex; Level: Super 100; Prize: $100,000; Format: 48MS/32WS/32MD/32WD/32XD	(India) Tanisha Crasto (India) Ashwini Ponnappa	(China) Li Huazhou (China) Wang Zimeng
3–8 December	Guwahati Masters (Draw): Host: Guwahati, India; Venue: Saru Sajai Indoor Sports Complex; Level: Super 100; Prize: $100,000; Format: 48MS/32WS/32MD/32WD/32XD	Score: 21–18, 21–12	
3–8 December	Guwahati Masters (Draw): Host: Guwahati, India; Venue: Saru Sajai Indoor Sports Complex; Level: Super 100; Prize: $100,000; Format: 48MS/32WS/32MD/32WD/32XD	(China) Zhang Hanyu (China) Bao Lijing	(England) Rory Easton (England) Lizzie Tolman
3–8 December	Guwahati Masters (Draw): Host: Guwahati, India; Venue: Saru Sajai Indoor Sports Complex; Level: Super 100; Prize: $100,000; Format: 48MS/32WS/32MD/32WD/32XD	Score: 21–15, 21–16	
10–15 December	Odisha Masters (Draw): Host: Cuttack, Odisha, India; Venue: Jawaharlal Nehru Indoor Stadium; Level: Super 100; Prize: $100,000; Format: 48MS/32WS/32MD/32WD/32XD	(India) Rithvik Sanjeevi	(India) Tharun Mannepalli
10–15 December	Odisha Masters (Draw): Host: Cuttack, Odisha, India; Venue: Jawaharlal Nehru Indoor Stadium; Level: Super 100; Prize: $100,000; Format: 48MS/32WS/32MD/32WD/32XD	Score: 21–18, 21–16	
10–15 December	Odisha Masters (Draw): Host: Cuttack, Odisha, India; Venue: Jawaharlal Nehru Indoor Stadium; Level: Super 100; Prize: $100,000; Format: 48MS/32WS/32MD/32WD/32XD	(China) Cai Yanyan	(India) Tanvi Sharma
10–15 December	Odisha Masters (Draw): Host: Cuttack, Odisha, India; Venue: Jawaharlal Nehru Indoor Stadium; Level: Super 100; Prize: $100,000; Format: 48MS/32WS/32MD/32WD/32XD	Score: 21–14, 21–16	
10–15 December	Odisha Masters (Draw): Host: Cuttack, Odisha, India; Venue: Jawaharlal Nehru Indoor Stadium; Level: Super 100; Prize: $100,000; Format: 48MS/32WS/32MD/32WD/32XD	(China) Huang Di (China) Liu Yang	(Japan) Kakeru Kumagai (Japan) Hiroki Nishi
10–15 December	Odisha Masters (Draw): Host: Cuttack, Odisha, India; Venue: Jawaharlal Nehru Indoor Stadium; Level: Super 100; Prize: $100,000; Format: 48MS/32WS/32MD/32WD/32XD	Score: 21–13, 19–21, 27–25	
10–15 December	Odisha Masters (Draw): Host: Cuttack, Odisha, India; Venue: Jawaharlal Nehru Indoor Stadium; Level: Super 100; Prize: $100,000; Format: 48MS/32WS/32MD/32WD/32XD	(Japan) Nanako Hara (Japan) Riko Kiyose	(China) Keng Shuliang (China) Wang Tingge
10–15 December	Odisha Masters (Draw): Host: Cuttack, Odisha, India; Venue: Jawaharlal Nehru Indoor Stadium; Level: Super 100; Prize: $100,000; Format: 48MS/32WS/32MD/32WD/32XD	Score: 21–11, 21–19	
10–15 December	Odisha Masters (Draw): Host: Cuttack, Odisha, India; Venue: Jawaharlal Nehru Indoor Stadium; Level: Super 100; Prize: $100,000; Format: 48MS/32WS/32MD/32WD/32XD	(China) Gao Jiaxuan (China) Tang Ruizhi	(Singapore) Terry Hee (Singapore) Jin Yujia
10–15 December	Odisha Masters (Draw): Host: Cuttack, Odisha, India; Venue: Jawaharlal Nehru Indoor Stadium; Level: Super 100; Prize: $100,000; Format: 48MS/32WS/32MD/32WD/32XD	Score: 15–21, 21–15, 21–15	
11–15 December	BWF World Tour Finals (Draw): Host: Hangzhou, China; Venue: Hangzhou Olympic Sports Center; Level: World Tour Finals; Prize: $2,500,000; Format: 8MS/8WS/8MD/8WD/8XD	(China) Shi Yuqi	(Denmark) Anders Antonsen
11–15 December	BWF World Tour Finals (Draw): Host: Hangzhou, China; Venue: Hangzhou Olympic Sports Center; Level: World Tour Finals; Prize: $2,500,000; Format: 8MS/8WS/8MD/8WD/8XD	Score: 21–18, 21–14	
11–15 December	BWF World Tour Finals (Draw): Host: Hangzhou, China; Venue: Hangzhou Olympic Sports Center; Level: World Tour Finals; Prize: $2,500,000; Format: 8MS/8WS/8MD/8WD/8XD	(China) Wang Zhiyi	(China) Han Yue
11–15 December	BWF World Tour Finals (Draw): Host: Hangzhou, China; Venue: Hangzhou Olympic Sports Center; Level: World Tour Finals; Prize: $2,500,000; Format: 8MS/8WS/8MD/8WD/8XD	Score: 19–21, 21–19, 21–11	
11–15 December	BWF World Tour Finals (Draw): Host: Hangzhou, China; Venue: Hangzhou Olympic Sports Center; Level: World Tour Finals; Prize: $2,500,000; Format: 8MS/8WS/8MD/8WD/8XD	(Denmark) Kim Astrup (Denmark) Anders Skaarup Rasmussen	(Malaysia) Goh Sze Fei (Malaysia) Nur Izzuddin
11–15 December	BWF World Tour Finals (Draw): Host: Hangzhou, China; Venue: Hangzhou Olympic Sports Center; Level: World Tour Finals; Prize: $2,500,000; Format: 8MS/8WS/8MD/8WD/8XD	Score: 21–17, 17–21, 21–11	
11–15 December	BWF World Tour Finals (Draw): Host: Hangzhou, China; Venue: Hangzhou Olympic Sports Center; Level: World Tour Finals; Prize: $2,500,000; Format: 8MS/8WS/8MD/8WD/8XD	(South Korea) Baek Ha-na (South Korea) Lee So-hee	(Japan) Nami Matsuyama (Japan) Chiharu Shida
11–15 December	BWF World Tour Finals (Draw): Host: Hangzhou, China; Venue: Hangzhou Olympic Sports Center; Level: World Tour Finals; Prize: $2,500,000; Format: 8MS/8WS/8MD/8WD/8XD	Score: 21–19, 21–14	
11–15 December	BWF World Tour Finals (Draw): Host: Hangzhou, China; Venue: Hangzhou Olympic Sports Center; Level: World Tour Finals; Prize: $2,500,000; Format: 8MS/8WS/8MD/8WD/8XD	(China) Zheng Siwei (China) Huang Yaqiong	(Malaysia) Chen Tang Jie (Malaysia) Toh Ee Wei
11–15 December	BWF World Tour Finals (Draw): Host: Hangzhou, China; Venue: Hangzhou Olympic Sports Center; Level: World Tour Finals; Prize: $2,500,000; Format: 8MS/8WS/8MD/8WD/8XD	Score: 21–18, 14–21, 21–17	

== Statistics ==
=== Performance by countries ===
Below are the 2024 BWF World Tour performances by countries. Only countries who have won a title are listed:

==== BWF World Tour ====
Rank	Team	BWTF	Super 1000				Super 750						Super 500									Super 300											Total
Rank	Team	CHN	MAS	ENG	INA	CHN	IND	FRA	SGP	JPN	DEN	CHN	INA	THA	MAS	AUS	CAN	KOR	HKG	FIN	JPN	THA	GER	FRA	SUI	ESP	USA	TPE	MAC	GER	KOR	IND	Total
1	China	3	2	1	4	4	1	3	4	2	3	2	3	1	1	2		1	2	3	2	1	1	1					4		1	1	53
2	Japan		1				1			1	1				1	1	2				1	1		2		1	3						16
3	South Korea	1	1	1	1		1	1	1			2						2	1									1			1		14
4	Denmark	1	1								1	1	1		2		2		1				1							2			13
5	Thailand						1							2			1				1	2				1	2	1			1	1	13
6	Indonesia			2									1			1		1			1			1	1	2		1			1		12
7	Malaysia					1				1				1	1	1		1	1	1				1	1						1		11
8	Chinese Taipei						1													1		1	1		1			2		1			8
9	India							1						1																		3	5
10	France									1													1							1			3
11	Spain			1																					1								2
12	Hong Kong																						1						1				2
13	England																								1					1			2
14	Singapore																									1							1

==== BWF Tour Super 100 ====
Rank	Team	CHN I	TPE	CHN II	INA I	VIE	MAS	INA II	IND I	IND II	Total
1	China	3		5					2	3	13
2	Indonesia		1		3	1		4			9
3	Japan	1			1	2	1	1		1	7
4	Chinese Taipei		3			1	2				6
5	Thailand	1	1		1						3
6	Malaysia						2		1		3
7	India								2	1	3
8	Vietnam					1					1

=== Performance by categories ===
==== Men's singles ====
Rank	Player	BWTF	1000	750	500	300	100	Total
1	(China) Shi Yuqi	1	1	3				5
2	(Denmark) Anders Antonsen		1	2	1			4
3	(Denmark) Viktor Axelsen				2			2
3	(Malaysia) Lee Zii Jia				2			2
5	(Chinese Taipei) Chou Tien-chen				1	1		2
6	(Chinese Taipei) Lin Chun-yi					2		2
6	(France) Christo Popov					2		2
6	(Japan) Yushi Tanaka					2		2
9	(China) Weng Hongyang		1					1
9	(Indonesia) Jonatan Christie		1					1
11	(France) Alex Lanier			1				1
12	(China) Li Shifeng				1			1
12	(China) Lu Guangzu				1			1
12	(Japan) Koki Watanabe				1			1
15	(Hong Kong) Ng Ka Long					1		1
15	(India) Lakshya Sen					1		1
15	(Singapore) Loh Kean Yew					1		1
15	(Thailand) Kunlavut Vitidsarn					1		1
19	(China) Hu Zhean						1	1
19	(China) Wang Zhengxing						1	1
19	(Chinese Taipei) Chi Yu-jen						1	1
19	(Chinese Taipei) Lee Chia-hao						1	1
19	(India) Sathish Karunakaran						1	1
19	(India) Rithvik Sanjeevi						1	1
19	(Indonesia) Alwi Farhan						1	1
19	(Indonesia) Zaki Ubaidillah						1	1
19	(Japan) Shogo Ogawa						1	1

==== Women's singles ====
Rank	Player	BWTF	1000	750	500	300	100	Total
1	(China) Wang Zhiyi	1	1	1	2			5
2	(South Korea) An Se-young		1	3				4
3	(Spain) Carolina Marín		1			1		2
4	(Japan) Akane Yamaguchi			1	1			2
5	(China) Han Yue				2			2
6	(Japan) Aya Ohori				1	1		2
7	(Denmark) Mia Blichfeldt					2		2
8	(China) Cai Yanyan						2	2
8	(Japan) Kaoru Sugiyama						2	2
10	(China) Chen Yufei		1					1
11	(Chinese Taipei) Tai Tzu-ying			1				1
12	(South Korea) Kim Ga-eun				1			1
12	(Thailand) Supanida Katethong				1			1
12	(Thailand) Busanan Ongbamrungphan				1			1
15	(China) Gao Fangjie					1		1
15	(India) P. V. Sindhu					1		1
15	(Indonesia) Putri Kusuma Wardani					1		1
15	(Japan) Tomoka Miyazaki					1		1
15	(Japan) Natsuki Nidaira					1		1
15	(South Korea) Sim Yu-jin					1		1
15	(Thailand) Ratchanok Intanon					1		1
22	(China) Han Qianxi						1	1
22	(Chinese Taipei) Hsu Wen-chi						1	1
22	(Indonesia) Ni Kadek Dhinda Amartya Pratiwi						1	1
22	(Japan) Riko Gunji						1	1
22	(Vietnam) Nguyễn Thùy Linh						1	1

==== Men's doubles ====
Rank	Player	BWTF	1000	750	500	300	100	Total
1	(Denmark) Kim Astrup	1			2			3
1	(Denmark) Anders Skaarup Rasmussen	1			2			3
3	(China) Liang Weikeng		2	1				3
3	(China) Wang Chang		2	1				3
5	(Malaysia) Goh Sze Fei		1	1	1			3
5	(Malaysia) Nur Izzuddin		1	1	1			3
7	(South Korea) Seo Seung-jae			2	1			3
8	(China) He Jiting			1	1	1		3
8	(China) Ren Xiangyu			1	1	1		3
10	(China) Huang Di					1	2	3
10	(China) Liu Yang					1	2	3
12	(India) Satwiksairaj Rankireddy			1	1			2
12	(India) Chirag Shetty			1	1			2
12	(South Korea) Kang Min-hyuk			1	1			2
15	(Indonesia) Leo Rolly Carnando				2			2
16	(Chinese Taipei) Lee Jhe-huei					2		2
16	(Chinese Taipei) Yang Po-hsuan					2		2
16	(England) Ben Lane					2		2
16	(England) Sean Vendy					2		2
20	(Indonesia) Fajar Alfian		1		1			2
20	(Indonesia) Muhammad Rian Ardianto		1		1			2
22	(South Korea) Jin Yong			1				1
23	(Indonesia) Daniel Marthin				1			1
23	(Indonesia) Bagas Maulana				1			1
25	(China) Chen Xujun					1		1
25	(China) Liu Yi					1		1
25	(Indonesia) Sabar Karyaman Gutama					1		1
25	(Indonesia) Muhammad Reza Pahlevi Isfahani					1		1
25	(Malaysia) Aaron Chia					1		1
25	(Malaysia) Soh Wooi Yik					1		1
25	(Malaysia) Choong Hon Jian					1		1
25	(Malaysia) Muhammad Haikal					1		1
25	(Thailand) Peeratchai Sukphun					1		1
25	(Thailand) Pakkapon Teeraratsakul					1		1
35	(China) Tan Qiang						1	1
35	(China) Zhou Haodong						1	1
35	(Chinese Taipei) Chang Ko-chi						1	1
35	(Chinese Taipei) Chen Xin-yuan						1	1
35	(Chinese Taipei) He Zhi-wei						1	1
35	(Chinese Taipei) Huang Jui-hsuan						1	1
35	(Indonesia) Rahmat Hidayat						1	1
35	(Indonesia) Yeremia Rambitan						1	1
35	(Malaysia) Chia Wei Jie						1	1
35	(Malaysia) Low Hang Yee						1	1
35	(Malaysia) Lwi Sheng Hao						1	1
35	(Malaysia) Ng Eng Cheong						1	1
35	(Thailand) Chaloempon Charoenkitamorn						1	1
35	(Thailand) Worrapol Thongsa-nga						1	1

==== Women's doubles ====
Rank	Player	BWTF	1000	750	500	300	100	Total
1	(China) Liu Shengshu		1	2	3			6
1	(China) Tan Ning		1	2	3			6
3	(Japan) Rin Iwanaga			1	2	2		5
3	(Japan) Kie Nakanishi			1	2	2		5
5	(South Korea) Baek Ha-na	1	2					3
5	(South Korea) Lee So-hee	1	2					3
7	(China) Li Yijing		1			1		2
7	(China) Luo Xumin		1			1		2
9	(China) Chen Qingchen			2				2
9	(China) Jia Yifan			2				2
11	(Indonesia) Febriana Dwipuji Kusuma				1	1		2
11	(Indonesia) Amalia Cahaya Pratiwi				1	1		2
11	(South Korea) Kim Hye-jeong				1	1		2
14	(Indonesia) Jesita Putri Miantoro						2	2
14	(Indonesia) Febi Setianingrum						2	2
16	(Japan) Mayu Matsumoto			1				1
16	(Japan) Wakana Nagahara			1				1
18	(Malaysia) Pearly Tan				1			1
18	(Malaysia) Thinaah Muralitharan				1			1
18	(South Korea) Jeong Na-eun				1			1
18	(Thailand) Jongkolphan Kititharakul				1			1
18	(Thailand) Rawinda Prajongjai				1			1
23	(China) Li Wenmei					1		1
23	(China) Zhang Shuxian					1		1
23	(Chinese Taipei) Sung Shuo-yun					1		1
23	(Chinese Taipei) Yu Chien-hui					1		1
23	(India) Treesa Jolly					1		1
23	(India) Gayatri Gopichand					1		1
23	(Indonesia) Lanny Tria Mayasari					1		1
23	(Indonesia) Meilysa Trias Puspita Sari					1		1
23	(Indonesia) Rachel Allessya Rose					1		1
23	(Indonesia) Ribka Sugiarto					1		1
23	(South Korea) Kong Hee-yong					1		1
23	(Thailand) Benyapa Aimsaard					1		1
23	(Thailand) Nuntakarn Aimsaard					1		1
36	(China) Chen Xiaofei						1	1
36	(China) Feng Xueying						1	1
36	(Chinese Taipei) Hsieh Pei-shan						1	1
36	(Chinese Taipei) Hung En-tzu						1	1
36	(India) Tanisha Crasto						1	1
36	(India) Ashwini Ponnappa						1	1
36	(Japan) Nanako Hara						1	1
36	(Japan) Riko Kiyose						1	1
36	(Japan) Mizuki Otake						1	1
36	(Japan) Miyu Takahashi						1	1
36	(Malaysia) Go Pei Kee						1	1
36	(Malaysia) Teoh Mei Xing						1	1
36	(Thailand) Laksika Kanlaha						1	1
36	(Thailand) Phataimas Muenwong						1	1

==== Mixed doubles ====
Rank	Player	BWTF	1000	750	500	300	100	Total
1	(China) Feng Yanzhe		1	3	1			5
1	(China) Huang Dongping		1	3	1			5
3	(China) Zheng Siwei	1	1	1	1			4
3	(China) Huang Yaqiong	1	1	1	1			4
5	(China) Jiang Zhenbang		1	1	2			4
5	(China) Wei Yaxin		1	1	2			4
7	(Thailand) Dechapol Puavaranukroh			1	1	2		4
8	(China) Guo Xinwa				1	2		3
8	(China) Chen Fanghui				1	2		3
10	(Thailand) Sapsiree Taerattanachai			1		1		2
11	(Denmark) Jesper Toft				1	1		2
11	(Denmark) Amalie Magelund				1	1		2
11	(Malaysia) Goh Soon Huat				1	1		2
11	(Malaysia) Shevon Jemie Lai				1	1		2
11	(Thailand) Supissara Paewsampran				1	1		2
16	(Thailand) Pakkapon Teeraratsakul					2		2
16	(Thailand) Phataimas Muenwong					2		2
18	(China) Zhang Hanyu						2	2
18	(China) Bao Lijing						2	2
20	(Japan) Yuta Watanabe		1					1
20	(Japan) Arisa Igarashi		1					1
22	(Malaysia) Chen Tang Jie				1			1
22	(Malaysia) Toh Ee Wei				1			1
24	(China) Cheng Xing					1		1
24	(China) Zhang Chi					1		1
24	(Hong Kong) Tang Chun Man					1		1
24	(Hong Kong) Tse Ying Suet					1		1
24	(Indonesia) Rinov Rivaldy					1		1
24	(Indonesia) Pitha Haningtyas Mentari					1		1
30	(China) Gao Jiaxuan						1	1
30	(China) Zhou Zhihong						1	1
30	(China) Tang Ruizhi						1	1
30	(China) Yang Jiayi						1	1
30	(Chinese Taipei) Ye Hong-wei						1	1
30	(Chinese Taipei) Nicole Gonzales Chan						1	1
30	(Indonesia) Jafar Hidayatullah						1	1
30	(Indonesia) Adnan Maulana						1	1
30	(Indonesia) Amri Syahnawi						1	1
30	(Indonesia) Indah Cahya Sari Jamil						1	1
30	(Indonesia) Nita Violina Marwah						1	1
30	(Indonesia) Felisha Pasaribu						1	1
30	(Thailand) Ruttanapak Oupthong						1	1
30	(Thailand) Jhenicha Sudjaipraparat						1	1

== World Tour Rankings ==
The points are calculated from the following levels:

- BWF World Tour Super 1000
- BWF World Tour Super 750
- BWF World Tour Super 500
- BWF World Tour Super 300
- BWF Tour Super 100

Information on Points, Won, Lost, and % columns were calculated after the China Masters.

Key

(D)C	(Defending) Champion
F	Finalists
SF	Semi-finalists
QF	Quarter-finalists
#R	Round 1/2/3
RR	Round Robin
Q#	Qualification Round 1/2

=== Men's singles ===
The table below was based on the ranking of men's singles as of 26 November 2024.

Rankings		WR	Player		TP	Points	WTF		IND	IND	IND	MAS	IND	INA	THA	GER	FRA	ENG	FRA	SUI	CHN	ESP	THA	MAS	SGP	INA	AUS	TPE	USA	CAN	CHN	JPN	KOR	INA	TPE	HKG	VIE	CHN	MAC	INA	FIN	DEN	MAS	GER	KOR	JPN	CHN	Won	Lost	%
Rankings		WR	Player		TP	Points	Eli	BWTF	300	100	100	1000	750	500	300	300	750	1000	300	300	100	300	500	500	750	1000	500	100	300	500	100	750	500	100	300	500	100	1000	300	100	500	750	100	300	300	500	750	Won	Lost	%
Qualified as Olympics winner
14	▲4	3	(Denmark)	Viktor Axelsen	10	67,160	✗	–	–	–	–	SF	–	–	–	–	2R	QF	–	–	–	–	–	C	SF	–	–	–	–	–	–	–	–	–	–	C	–	1R	–	–	–	2R	–	–	–	SF	SF	27	8	77.14%
Qualified by World Tour Finals Ranking
1	Steady	2	(Denmark)	Anders Antonsen	15	95,970	✓	F	–	–	–	C	–	C	–	–	QF	2R	–	–	–	–	1R	QF	2R	F	–	–	–	QF	–	1R	QF	–	–	–	–	QF	–	–	1R	C	–	–	–	–	C	34	10	77.27%
2	Steady	1	(China)	Shi Yuqi	10	87,640	✓	C	–	–	–	F	C	–	–	–	C	QF	–	–	–	–	–	–	C	C	–	–	–	–	–	SF	QF	–	–	–	–	2R	–	–	–	–	–	–	–	–	SF	35	6	85.37%
3	▼1	9	(Chinese Taipei)	Chou Tien-chen	25	85,060	✓	SF	1R	–	–	1R	1R	2R	C	2R	1R	1R	–	F	–	SF	SF	QF	SF	2R	QF	–	–	–	–	F	–	–	SF	QF	–	2R	–	–	C	2R	–	QF	–	2R	1R	44	22	66.67%
4	▼1	7	(Japan)	Kodai Naraoka	17	83,590	✓	RR	–	–	–	QF	SF	–	–	–	1R	1R	–	–	–	–	QF	–	QF	1R	F	–	–	QF	–	SF	QF	–	–	QF	–	F	–	–	QF	1R	–	–	–	QF	–	29	16	64.44%
5	Steady	5	(Thailand)	Kunlavut Vitidsarn	13	81,400	✓	RR	–	–	–	2R	2R	SF	–	–	F	2R	–	–	–	–	SF	–	–	SF	–	–	–	–	–	–	–	–	–	–	–	SF	–	–	SF	2R	–	–	C	2R	QF	31	11	73.81%
6	Steady	8	(Malaysia)	Lee Zii Jia	15	74,940	✓	RR	–	–	–	1R	QF	QF	–	–	1R	QF	–	2R	–	–	C	F	–	QF	C	–	–	–	–	1R	–	–	–	–	–	1R	–	–	QF	–	–	–	–	QF	1R	27	13	67.50%
7	▲5	4	(Indonesia)	Jonatan Christie	13	73,670	✓	SF	–	–	–	1R	2R	1R	–	–	2R	C	–	–	–	–	–	–	1R	1R	–	–	–	QF	–	1R	2R	–	–	SF	–	SF	–	–	F	2R	–	–	–	SF	F	23	12	65.71%
8	Steady	6	(China)	Li Shifeng	14	73,100	✓	RR	–	–	–	QF	2R	1R	–	–	2R	1R	–	–	–	–	–	QF	F	SF	–	–	–	–	–	–	QF	–	–	–	–	1R	–	–	2R	QF	–	–	–	C	1R	23	13	63.89%
9	▼2	11	(Japan)	Koki Watanabe	15	72,120	✗	–	–	–	–	2R	QF	–	–	–	1R	QF	–	1R	–	–	2R	1R	–	–	–	–	SF	C	–	1R	–	–	–	–	–	QF	–	–	SF	F	–	–	–	2R	1R	24	14	63.16%
10	▼1	13	(Chinese Taipei)	Lin Chun-yi	15	70,070	✗	–	QF	–	–	SF	1R	1R	QF	QF	2R	1R	–	C	–	2R	–	1R	2R	1R	SF	–	1R	1R	–	2R	SF	–	C	–	–	–	–	–	–	–	–	–	–	–	2R	27	17	61.36%
11	Steady	16	(China)	Lu Guangzu	16	67,300	✗	–	–	–	–	QF	1R	2R	–	–	QF	1R	–	–	–	–	QF	SF	1R	2R	–	–	–	–	–	1R	C	–	–	1R	–	1R	–	–	2R	QF	–	–	–	1R	2R	20	16	55.56%
12	▲1	18	(Hong Kong)	Ng Ka Long	19	67,180	✗	–	–	–	–	QF	1R	2R	QF	1R	2R	1R	–	–	–	–	F	SF	1R	1R	–	–	–	QF	–	1R	2R	–	–	1R	–	1R	C	–	2R	1R	–	–	–	1R	QF	24	20	54.55%
13	▼1	15	(Japan)	Kenta Nishimoto	20	67,160	✗	–	F	–	–	1R	2R	1R	1R	–	1R	2R	–	2R	–	–	–	–	QF	2R	QF	–	–	QF	–	QF	1R	–	–	1R	–	2R	–	–	1R	SF	–	–	–	2R	1R	21	20	51.22%
15	▼2	12	(Singapore)	Loh Kean Yew	17	63,480	✗	–	–	–	–	1R	–	QF	F	–	QF	2R	–	1R	–	C	1R	1R	QF	1R	2R	–	–	–	–	1R	–	–	–	1R	–	2R	–	–	–	QF	–	–	–	–	1R	20	16	55.56%

=== Women's singles ===
The table below was based on the ranking of women's singles as of 26 November 2024.

Rankings		WR	Player		TP	Points	WTF		IND	IND	IND	MAS	IND	INA	THA	GER	FRA	ENG	FRA	SUI	CHN	ESP	THA	MAS	SGP	INA	AUS	TPE	USA	CAN	CHN	JPN	KOR	INA	TPE	HKG	VIE	CHN	MAC	INA	UAE	FIN	DEN	MAS	GER	KOR	JPN	CHN	Won	Lost	%
Rankings		WR	Player		TP	Points	Eli	BWTF	300	100	100	1000	750	500	300	300	750	1000	300	300	100	300	500	500	750	1000	500	100	300	500	100	750	500	100	300	500	100	1000	300	100	100	500	750	100	300	300	500	750	Won	Lost	%
Qualified as Olympics winner
4	▲6	1	(South Korea)	An Se-young	8	79,000	✓	SF	–	–	–	C	QF	–	–	–	C	SF	–	–	–	–	–	–	C	F	–	–	–	–	–	–	–	–	–	–	–	–	–	–	–	–	F	–	–	–	–	C	33	4	89.19%
Qualified by World Tour Finals Ranking
1	Steady	2	(China)	Wang Zhiyi	16	101,830	✓	C	–	–	–	2R	SF	C	–	–	2R	2R	–	–	–	–	SF	C	QF	SF	–	–	–	–	–	2R	F	–	–	–	–	C	–	–	–	1R	C	–	–	–	2R	2R	41	11	78.85%
2	Steady	8	(China)	Han Yue	16	82,650	✓	F	–	–	–	2R	2R	QF	–	–	2R	QF	–	–	–	–	F	QF	2R	QF	–	–	–	–	–	QF	QF	–	–	C	–	1R	–	–	–	C	2R	–	–	–	–	1R	31	14	68.89%
3	Steady	6	(Indonesia)	Gregoria Mariska Tunjung	15	80,990	✓	RR	–	–	–	QF	2R	QF	–	–	2R	QF	–	F	–	–	QF	–	SF	QF	–	–	–	–	–	–	–	–	–	2R	–	1R	–	–	–	QF	SF	–	–	–	F	2R	29	15	65.91%
5	▼1	9	(Japan)	Aya Ohori	17	75,950	✓	SF	SF	–	–	1R	2R	2R	C	–	QF	1R	–	QF	–	–	–	–	1R	2R	C	–	–	–	–	QF	–	–	–	QF	–	SF	–	–	–	2R	1R	–	–	–	QF	1R	30	16	65.22%
6	▼1	12	(Thailand)	Busanan Ongbamrungphan	21	75,900	✓	RR	–	–	–	2R	QF	2R	SF	–	2R	2R	–	1R	–	–	2R	SF	2R	–	–	–	QF	C	–	F	2R	–	–	QF	–	2R	QF	–	–	QF	1R	–	–	–	1R	2R	32	19	62.75%
7	Steady	10	(Thailand)	Supanida Katethong	17	74,350	✓	RR	–	–	–	1R	2R	1R	F	QF	1R	1R	–	2R	–	F	C	–	1R	2R	–	–	–	–	–	SF	–	–	–	–	–	–	–	–	–	QF	QF	–	–	–	QF	SF	30	16	65.22%
8	▼2	4	(Japan)	Akane Yamaguchi	11	73,760	✓	RR	–	–	–	QF	2R	–	–	–	F	F	–	–	–	–	–	–	QF	1R	–	–	–	–	–	C	1R	–	–	–	–	SF	–	–	–	–	1R	–	–	–	C	1R	26	10	72.22%
9	Steady	11	(Japan)	Tomoka Miyazaki	16	73,540	✗	–	–	–	–	–	–	–	2R	–	–	–	C	SF	–	1R	–	–	2R	1R	–	–	–	–	–	1R	1R	–	–	SF	–	F	SF	–	–	QF	2R	–	–	SF	1R	SF	30	15	66.67%
10	▼2	14	(Thailand)	Pornpawee Chochuwong	18	72,470	✗	–	–	–	–	–	2R	1R	–	2R	1R	2R	–	QF	–	QF	SF	2R	SF	1R	–	–	–	–	–	1R	QF	–	–	SF	–	QF	2R	–	–	2R	1R	–	–	–	SF	SF	29	20	59.18%
11	Steady	17	(Thailand)	Ratchanok Intanon	18	63,600	✗	–	–	–	–	2R	1R	QF	QF	QF	1R	1R	–	1R	–	C	2R	2R	–	2R	–	–	–	–	–	–	–	–	–	1R	–	–	1R	–	–	F	2R	–	–	–	2R	1R	23	18	56.10%
12	▼1	19	(Indonesia)	Putri Kusuma Wardani	17	62,770	✗	–	–	–	–	1R	–	2R	–	–	–	–	–	1R	–	2R	1R	QF	–	1R	QF	–	–	–	–	–	–	–	F	F	–	–	QF	–	–	2R	SF	–	–	C	1R	–	25	14	64.10%
13	▲2	13	(Singapore)	Yeo Jia Min	13	62,620	✗	–	–	–	–	QF	SF	1R	–	–	–	1R	–	–	–	–	QF	–	1R	–	–	–	–	–	–	–	QF	–	–	2R	–	QF	–	–	–	QF	QF	–	–	–	1R	QF	18	13	58.06%
14	▼1	16	(Japan)	Nozomi Okuhara	12	60,550	✗	–	C	–	C	–	QF	F	QF	–	1R	1R	–	SF	–	–	–	–	QF	1R	–	–	–	SF	–	2R	–	–	–	–	–	–	–	–	–	–	–	–	–	–	–	–	27	11	71.05%
15	▲3	25	(China)	Zhang Yiman	15	59,760	✗	–	–	–	–	SF	1R	2R	–	–	QF	1R	–	–	–	–	1R	SF	1R	1R	–	–	–	–	–	1R	2R	–	–	–	–	2R	–	–	–	2R	1R	–	–	–	–	QF	11	12	47.83%

=== Men's doubles ===
The table below was based on the ranking of men's doubles as of 19 November 2024.

Rankings		WR	Player		TP	Points	WTF		IND	IND	IND	MAS	IND	INA	THA	GER	FRA	ENG	FRA	SUI	CHN	ESP	THA	MAS	SGP	INA	AUS	USA	CAN	JPN	KOR	INA	TPE	HKG	VIE	CHN	MAC	INA	UAE	FIN	DEN	MAS	GER	KOR	JPN	TPE	CHN	Won	Lost	%
Rankings		WR	Player		TP	Points	Eli	BWTF	300	100	100	1000	750	500	300	300	750	1000	300	300	100	300	500	500	750	1000	500	300	500	750	500	100	300	500	100	1000	300	100	100	500	750	100	300	300	500	100	750	Won	Lost	%
Qualified as Olympics winner
39	▼1	11	(Chinese Taipei)	Lee Yang	9	35,900	✓	RR	–	–	–	1R	2R	2R	–	–	1R	QF	–	QF	–	–	–	–	2R	2R	–	–	–	–	–	–	2R	–	–	–	–	–	–	–	–	–	–	–	–	–	–	8	9	47.06%
39	▼1	11	(Chinese Taipei)	Wang Chi-lin	9	35,900	✓	RR	–	–	–	1R	2R	2R	–	–	1R	QF	–	QF	–	–	–	–	2R	2R	–	–	–	–	–	–	2R	–	–	–	–	–	–	–	–	–	–	–	–	–	–	8	9	47.06%
Qualified by World Tour Finals Ranking
1	Steady	3	(Denmark)	Kim Astrup	14	96,280	✓	C	–	–	–	2R	QF	F	–	–	QF	2R	–	–	–	–	–	C	SF	SF	–	–	C	–	–	–	–	1R	–	QF	–	–	–	F	F	–	–	–	–	–	QF	38	12	76.00%
1	Steady	3	(Denmark)	Anders Skaarup Rasmussen	14	96,280	✓	C	–	–	–	2R	QF	F	–	–	QF	2R	–	–	–	–	–	C	SF	SF	–	–	C	–	–	–	–	1R	–	QF	–	–	–	F	F	–	–	–	–	–	QF	38	12	76.00%
2	Steady	6	(China)	He Jiting	17	93,300	✓	RR	–	–	–	QF	1R	2R	C	F	2R	QF	–	–	–	–	–	SF	C	2R	C	–	–	1R	QF	–	–	–	–	F	–	–	–	–	1R	–	–	–	2R	–	SF	39	14	73.58%
2	Steady	6	(China)	Ren Xiangyu	17	93,300	✓	RR	–	–	–	QF	1R	2R	C	F	2R	QF	–	–	–	–	–	SF	C	2R	C	–	–	1R	QF	–	–	–	–	F	–	–	–	–	1R	–	–	–	2R	–	SF	39	14	73.58%
3	▲1	4	(Indonesia)	Fajar Alfian	13	89,180	✓	SF	–	–	–	QF	QF	SF	–	–	QF	DC	–	–	–	–	–	–	F	1R	–	–	–	QF	–	–	–	–	–	QF	–	–	–	QF	SF	–	–	–	C	–	2R	33	11	75.00%
3	▲1	4	(Indonesia)	Muhammad Rian Ardianto	13	89,180	✓	SF	–	–	–	QF	QF	SF	–	–	QF	DC	–	–	–	–	–	–	F	1R	–	–	–	QF	–	–	–	–	–	QF	–	–	–	QF	SF	–	–	–	C	–	2R	33	11	75.00%
4	Steady	7	(Malaysia)	Goh Sze Fei	17	82,170	✓	F	–	–	–	2R	2R	1R	–	–	1R	1R	–	2R	–	–	–	QF	QF	QF	–	–	–	C	1R	–	–	2R	–	C	–	–	–	C	1R	–	–	–	2R	–	QF	32	15	68.09%
4	Steady	7	(Malaysia)	Nur Izzuddin	17	82,170	✓	F	–	–	–	2R	2R	1R	–	–	1R	1R	–	2R	–	–	–	QF	QF	QF	–	–	–	C	1R	–	–	2R	–	C	–	–	–	C	1R	–	–	–	2R	–	QF	32	15	68.09%
5	Steady	10	(Chinese Taipei)	Lee Jhe-huei	19	75,330	✓	RR	–	–	–	2R	1R	1R	QF	C	F	SF	–	–	–	–	–	2R	1R	QF	–	–	–	2R	2R	–	C	2R	–	1R	–	–	–	QF	2R	–	–	–	1R	–	1R	29	17	63.04%
5	Steady	10	(Chinese Taipei)	Yang Po-hsuan	19	75,330	✓	RR	–	–	–	2R	1R	1R	QF	C	F	SF	–	–	–	–	–	2R	1R	QF	–	–	–	2R	2R	–	C	2R	–	1R	–	–	–	QF	2R	–	–	–	1R	–	1R	29	17	63.04%
6	▲2	11	(Indonesia)	Sabar Karyaman Gutama	15	74,900	✓	SF	–	–	–	–	–	QF	1R	–	–	–	F	SF	–	C	1R	1R	2R	SF	–	–	–	2R	–	–	–	F	–	1R	F	–	–	–	–	–	–	2R	2R	–	F	33	15	68.75%
6	▲2	11	(Indonesia)	Muhammad Reza Pahlevi Isfahani	15	74,900	✓	SF	–	–	–	–	–	QF	1R	–	–	–	F	SF	–	C	1R	1R	2R	SF	–	–	–	2R	–	–	–	F	–	1R	F	–	–	–	–	–	–	2R	2R	–	F	33	15	68.75%
7	▲1	5	(Malaysia)	Aaron Chia	12	72,740	✓	RR	–	–	–	QF	SF	–	–	–	QF	F	–	–	–	–	–	QF	QF	2R	–	–	–	–	–	–	–	–	–	–	–	–	–	2R	QF	–	–	C	2R	–	QF	27	11	71.05%
7	▲1	5	(Malaysia)	Soh Wooi Yik	12	72,740	✓	RR	–	–	–	QF	SF	–	–	–	QF	F	–	–	–	–	–	QF	QF	2R	–	–	–	–	–	–	–	–	–	–	–	–	–	2R	QF	–	–	C	2R	–	QF	27	11	71.05%
8	▼2	2	(South Korea)	Kang Min-hyuk	10	70,900	✗	–	–	–	–	SF	C	–	–	–	SF	1R	–	–	–	–	–	–	QF	1R	–	–	–	F	F	–	–	C	–	2R	–	–	–	–	–	–	–	–	–	–	–	27	8	77.14%
8	▼2	2	(South Korea)	Seo Seung-jae	10	70,900	✗	–	–	–	–	SF	C	–	–	–	SF	1R	–	–	–	–	–	–	QF	1R	–	–	–	F	F	–	–	C	–	2R	–	–	–	–	–	–	–	–	–	–	–	27	8	77.14%
9	▲1	1	(China)	Liang Weikeng	10	70,630	✗	–	–	–	–	C	2R	–	–	–	2R	2R	–	–	–	–	–	–	QF	C	–	–	–	–	–	–	–	–	–	2R	–	–	–	SF	C	–	–	–	–	–	2R	26	7	78.79%
9	▲1	1	(China)	Wang Chang	10	70,630	✗	–	–	–	–	C	2R	–	–	–	2R	2R	–	–	–	–	–	–	QF	C	–	–	–	–	–	–	–	–	–	2R	–	–	–	SF	C	–	–	–	–	–	2R	26	7	78.79%
10	▲1	8	(Japan)	Takuro Hoki	11	69,060	✗	–	–	–	–	SF	SF	–	–	–	SF	SF	–	–	–	–	–	–	SF	1R	–	–	–	1R	–	–	–	–	–	–	–	–	–	2R	QF	–	–	–	F	–	QF	24	11	68.57%
10	▲1	8	(Japan)	Yugo Kobayashi	11	69,060	✗	–	–	–	–	SF	SF	–	–	–	SF	SF	–	–	–	–	–	–	SF	1R	–	–	–	1R	–	–	–	–	–	–	–	–	–	2R	QF	–	–	–	F	–	QF	24	11	68.57%
11	▼4	14	(Malaysia)	Man Wei Chong	17	68,780	✗	–	–	–	–	1R	1R	2R	–	–	2R	1R	–	QF	–	–	–	QF	2R	F	–	–	–	QF	1R	–	–	QF	–	QF	–	–	–	QF	2R	–	–	–	2R	–	2R	21	17	55.26%
11	▼4	14	(Malaysia)	Tee Kai Wun	17	68,780	✗	–	–	–	–	1R	1R	2R	–	–	2R	1R	–	QF	–	–	–	QF	2R	F	–	–	–	QF	1R	–	–	QF	–	QF	–	–	–	QF	2R	–	–	–	2R	–	2R	21	17	55.26%
12	Steady	15	(Denmark)	Rasmus Kjær	17	65,050	✗	–	SF	–	–	1R	2R	1R	–	SF	–	2R	–	–	–	–	–	QF	1R	2R	–	–	SF	–	–	–	–	2R	–	QF	–	–	–	1R	2R	–	F	–	1R	–	2R	22	17	56.41%
12	Steady	15	(Denmark)	Frederik Søgaard	17	65,050	✗	–	SF	–	–	1R	2R	1R	–	SF	–	2R	–	–	–	–	–	QF	1R	2R	–	–	SF	–	–	–	–	2R	–	QF	–	–	–	1R	2R	–	F	–	1R	–	2R	22	17	56.41%
13	▲1	19	(Malaysia)	Choong Hon Jian	14	61,100	✗	–	C	C	–	–	–	2R	1R	–	–	–	C	QF	–	–	QF	2R	–	1R	SF	–	–	2R	2R	–	–	–	–	1R	–	–	–	–	–	–	–	1R	1R	–	1R	26	13	66.67%
13	▲1	19	(Malaysia)	Muhammad Haikal	14	61,100	✗	–	C	C	–	–	–	2R	1R	–	–	–	C	QF	–	–	QF	2R	–	1R	SF	–	–	2R	2R	–	–	–	–	1R	–	–	–	–	–	–	–	1R	1R	–	1R	26	13	66.67%
13	▼1	12	(England)	Ben Lane	13	61,080	✗	–	SF	–	–	1R	1R	–	–	–	1R	1R	–	C	–	–	–	–	–	–	–	SF	F	–	–	–	–	–	–	2R	1R	–	–	QF	QF	–	C	–	–	–	–	25	11	69.44%
13	▼1	12	(England)	Sean Vendy	13	61,080	✗	–	SF	–	–	1R	1R	–	–	–	1R	1R	–	C	–	–	–	–	–	–	–	SF	F	–	–	–	–	–	–	2R	1R	–	–	QF	QF	–	C	–	–	–	–	25	11	69.44%
15	Steady	18	(China)	Chen Boyang	16	59,360	✗	–	–	–	–	1R	2R	1R	1R	–	–	–	1R	1R	–	2R	F	2R	2R	1R	–	–	–	QF	2R	–	–	2R	–	1R	1R	–	–	1R	SF	–	–	2R	QF	–	1R	18	22	45.00%
15	Steady	18	(China)	Liu Yi	16	59,360	✗	–	–	–	–	1R	2R	1R	1R	–	–	–	1R	1R	–	2R	F	2R	2R	1R	–	–	–	QF	2R	–	–	2R	–	1R	1R	–	–	1R	SF	–	–	2R	QF	–	1R	18	22	45.00%

=== Women's doubles ===
The table below was based on the ranking of women's doubles as of 26 November 2024.

Rankings		WR	Player		TP	Points	WTF		IND	IND	IND	MAS	IND	INA	THA	GER	FRA	ENG	FRA	SUI	CHN	ESP	THA	MAS	SGP	INA	AUS	TPE	USA	CAN	JPN	KOR	INA	TPE	HKG	VIE	CHN	MAC	INA	UAE	FIN	DEN	MAS	GER	KOR	JPN	CHN	Won	Lost	%
Rankings		WR	Player		TP	Points	Eli	BWTF	300	100	100	1000	750	500	300	300	750	1000	300	300	100	300	500	500	750	1000	500	100	300	500	750	500	100	300	500	100	1000	300	100	100	500	750	100	300	300	500	750	Won	Lost	%
Qualified as Olympics winner
22	Steady	3	(China)	Chen Qingchen	5	43,600	✓	SF	–	–	–	QF	–	–	–	–	C	2R	–	–	–	–	–	–	C	F	–	–	–	–	–	–	–	–	–													17	3	85.00%
22	Steady	3	(China)	Jia Yifan	5	43,600	✓	SF	–	–	–	QF	–	–	–	–	C	2R	–	–	–	–	–	–	C	F	–	–	–	–	–	–	–	–	–													17	3	85.00%
Qualified by World Tour Finals Ranking
1	Steady	1	(China)	Liu Shengshu	14	117,410	✓	SF	–	–	–	C	1R	C	–	–	SF	2R	–	–	–	–	–	–	SF	SF	–	–	–	–	–	C	F	–	–	–	–	QF	–	–	C	F	–	–	–	C	C	48	8	85.71%
1	Steady	1	(China)	Tan Ning	14	117,410	✓	SF	–	–	–	C	1R	C	–	–	SF	2R	–	–	–	–	–	–	SF	SF	–	–	–	–	–	C	F	–	–	–	–	QF	–	–	C	F	–	–	–	C	C	48	8	85.71%
2	Steady	5	(Japan)	Rin Iwanaga	17	96,630	✓	RR	C	–	–	SF	2R	–	–	–	1R	2R	–	QF	–	C	SF	C	–	–	–	–	C	C	–	SF	–	–	–	–	–	2R	–	–	SF	C	–	–	–	1R	2R	47	11	81.03%
2	Steady	5	(Japan)	Kie Nakanishi	17	96,630	✓	RR	C	–	–	SF	2R	–	–	–	1R	2R	–	QF	–	C	SF	C	–	–	–	–	C	C	–	SF	–	–	–	–	–	2R	–	–	SF	C	–	–	–	1R	2R	47	11	81.03%
3	▲1	7	(China)	Li Yijing	19	91,480	✗	–	–	–	–	2R	2R	1R	F	C	1R	1R	–	–	–	–	QF	QF	2R	QF	–	–	–	–	–	2R	QF	–	–	1R	–	C	–	–	SF	QF	–	–	F	SF	F	38	18	67.86%
3	▲1	7	(China)	Luo Xumin	19	91,480	✗	–	–	–	–	2R	2R	1R	F	C	1R	1R	–	–	–	–	QF	QF	2R	QF	–	–	–	–	–	2R	QF	–	–	1R	–	C	–	–	SF	QF	–	–	F	SF	F	38	18	67.86%
4	▼1	2	(South Korea)	Baek Ha-na	11	87,760	✓	C	–	–	–	SF	SF	–	–	–	QF	C	–	–	–	–	–	–	2R	C	–	–	–	–	–	F	SF	–	–	SF	–	QF	–	–	–	SF	–	–	2R	–		32	10	76.19%
4	▼1	2	(South Korea)	Lee So-hee	11	87,760	✓	C	–	–	–	SF	SF	–	–	–	QF	C	–	–	–	–	–	–	2R	C	–	–	–	–	–	F	SF	–	–	SF	–	QF	–	–	–	SF	–	–	2R	–		32	10	76.19%
5	Steady	6	(Malaysia)	Pearly Tan	16	80,890	✓	RR	SF	SF	–	1R	1R	–	–	–	2R	2R	–	SF	–	–	–	QF	2R	–	SF	–	–	–	–	QF	F	–	–	C	–	2R	–	–	F	QF	–	–	–	1R	QF	33	17	66.00%
5	Steady	6	(Malaysia)	Thinaah Muralitharan	16	80,890	✓	RR	SF	SF	–	1R	1R	–	–	–	2R	2R	–	SF	–	–	–	QF	2R	–	SF	–	–	–	–	QF	F	–	–	C	–	2R	–	–	F	QF	–	–	–	1R	QF	33	17	66.00%
6	Steady	4	(Japan)	Nami Matsuyama	12	78,940	✓	F	–	–	–	2R	QF	–	–	–	F	F	–	–	–	–	–	–	F	2R	–	–	–	–	–	QF	2R	–	–	–	–	2R	–	–	–	SF	–	–	–	SF	SF	26	12	68.42%
6	Steady	4	(Japan)	Chiharu Shida	12	78,940	✓	F	–	–	–	2R	QF	–	–	–	F	F	–	–	–	–	–	–	F	2R	–	–	–	–	–	QF	2R	–	–	–	–	2R	–	–	–	SF	–	–	–	SF	SF	26	12	68.42%
7	Steady	10	(Indonesia)	Febriana Dwipuji Kusuma	14	68,760	✓	RR	–	–	–	–	–	1R	SF	–	–	–	2R	2R	–	F	F	2R	–	1R	C	–	–	–	–	–	–	–	C	QF	–	–	–	–	–	–	–	–	SF	2R	QF	32	12	72.73%
7	Steady	10	(Indonesia)	Amallia Cahaya Pratiwi	14	68,760	✓	RR	–	–	–	–	–	1R	SF	–	–	–	2R	2R	–	F	F	2R	–	1R	C	–	–	–	–	–	–	–	C	QF	–	–	–	–	–	–	–	–	SF	2R	QF	32	12	72.73%
8	Steady	16	(India)	Treesa Jolly	18	62,560	✓	RR	QF	–	–	–	1R	–	QF	QF	QF	1R	–	QF	–	1R	–	2R	SF	2R	–	–	QF	QF	–	–	–	–	–	2R	–	1R	SF	–	–	1R	–	–	–	1R	2R	24	19	55.81%
8	Steady	16	(India)	Gayatri Gopichand	18	62,560	✓	RR	QF	–	–	–	1R	–	QF	QF	QF	1R	–	QF	–	1R	–	2R	SF	2R	–	–	QF	QF	–	–	–	–	–	2R	–	1R	SF	–	–	1R	–	–	–	1R	2R	24	19	55.81%
9	Steady	19	(Chinese Taipei)	Sung Shuo-yun	17	59,620	✗	–	1R	F	QF	–	–	1R	1R	1R	–	–	–	–	–	–	–	QF	1R	1R	QF	F	–	–	–	1R	–	–	1R	1R	–	2R	–	–	1R	2R	–	C	–	1R	2R	23	18	56.10%
9	Steady	19	(Chinese Taipei)	Yu Chien-hui	17	59,620	✗	–	1R	F	QF	–	–	1R	1R	1R	–	–	–	–	–	–	–	QF	1R	1R	QF	F	–	–	–	1R	–	–	1R	1R	–	2R	–	–	1R	2R	–	C	–	1R	2R	23	18	56.10%
10	▲2	25	(Chinese Taipei)	Chang Ching-hui	17	57,160	✗	–	2R	–	–	–	–	1R	1R	–	–	–	2R	1R	–	QF	QF	2R	2R	2R	–	–	–	–	–	2R	1R	–	QF	1R	–	1R	1R	–	QF	–	–	–	–	1R	2R	17	20	45.95%
10	▲2	25	(Chinese Taipei)	Yang Ching-tun	17	57,160	✗	–	2R	–	–	–	–	1R	1R	–	–	–	2R	1R	–	QF	QF	2R	2R	2R	–	–	–	–	–	2R	1R	–	QF	1R	–	1R	1R	–	QF	–	–	–	–	1R	2R	17	20	45.95%
11	▼1	13	(India)	Tanisha Crasto	13	56,080	✗	–	F	C	F	QF	1R	–	2R	–	1R	2R	–	2R	–	QF	SF	–	1R	2R	–	–	–	–	–	–	–	QF	QF	–	SF	–	–	–	–	–	–	–	–	–	–	32	14	69.57%
11	▼1	13	(India)	Ashwini Ponnappa	13	56,080	✗	–	F	C	F	QF	1R	–	2R	–	1R	2R	–	2R	–	QF	SF	–	1R	2R	–	–	–	–	–	–	–	QF	QF	–	SF	–	–	–	–	–	–	–	–	–	–	32	14	69.57%
12	Steady	9	(South Korea)	Kim So-yeong	11	55,210	✗	–	–	–	–	1R	QF	–	–	–	1R	SF	–	–	–	–	–	–	QF	QF	–	–	–	–	–	QF	2R	–	–	SF	–	2R	–	–	–	2R	–	–	–	–	–	16	11	59.26%
12	Steady	9	(South Korea)	Kong Hee-yong	11	55,210	✗	–	–	–	–	1R	QF	–	–	–	1R	SF	–	–	–	–	–	–	QF	QF	–	–	–	–	–	QF	2R	–	–	SF	–	2R	–	–	–	2R	–	–	–	–	–	16	11	59.26%
13	▲1	15	(Hong Kong)	Yeung Nga Ting	15	54,750	✗	–	–	–	–	2R	QF	1R	1R	QF	1R	1R	–	2R	–	–	–	–	–	2R	SF	–	–	–	–	2R	–	–	–	1R	–	2R	1R	–	–	–	–	–	–	2R	1R	12	16	42.86%
13	▲1	15	(Hong Kong)	Yeung Pui Lam	15	54,750	✗	–	–	–	–	2R	QF	1R	1R	QF	1R	1R	–	2R	–	–	–	–	–	2R	SF	–	–	–	–	2R	–	–	–	1R	–	2R	1R	–	–	–	–	–	–	2R	1R	12	16	42.86%
14	▼1	11	(South Korea)	Lee Yu-lim	11	54,500	✗	–	–	–	–	1R	2R	2R	SF	–	–	–	–	–	–	–	QF	F	–	–	–	–	–	–	–	1R	SF	–	–	QF	–	QF	–	–	–	2R	–	–	–	–	–	18	11	62.07%
14	▼1	11	(South Korea)	Shin Seung-chan	11	54,500	✗	–	–	–	–	1R	2R	2R	SF	–	–	–	–	–	–	–	QF	F	–	–	–	–	–	–	–	1R	SF	–	–	QF	–	QF	–	–	–	2R	–	–	–	–	–	18	11	62.07%
15	Steady	27	(Ukraine)	Polina Buhrova	16	48,140	✗	–	–	–	–	–	–	–	–	1R	–	–	–	–	–	1R	2R	2R	1R	1R	QF	–	QF	1R	–	1R	–	1R	–	1R	–	2R	1R	–	–	2R	–	F	–	–	–	8	15	34.78%
15	Steady	27	(Ukraine)	Yevheniia Kantemyr	16	48,140	✗	–	–	–	–	–	–	–	–	1R	–	–	–	–	–	1R	2R	2R	1R	1R	QF	–	QF	1R	–	1R	–	1R	–	1R	–	2R	1R	–	–	2R	–	F	–	–	–	8	15	34.78%

=== Mixed doubles ===
The table below was based on the ranking of mixed doubles as 26 November 2024.

Rankings		WR	Player		TP	Points	WTF		IND	IND	IND	MAS	IND	INA	THA	GER	FRA	ENG	FRA	SUI	CHN	ESP	THA	MAS	SGP	INA	AUS	TPE	USA	CAN	CHN	JPN	KOR	INA	TPE	HKG	VIE	CHN	MAC	INA	FIN	DEN	MAS	GER	KOR	JPN	CHN	Won	Lost	%
Rankings		WR	Player		TP	Points	Eli	BWTF	300	100	100	1000	750	500	300	300	750	1000	300	300	100	300	500	500	750	1000	500	100	300	500	100	750	500	100	300	500	100	1000	300	100	500	750	100	300	300	500	750	Won	Lost	%
Qualified as Olympics winner
19	Steady	3	(China)	Zheng Siwei	6	55,050	✓	DC	–	–	–	QF	–	C	–	–	QF	DC	–	–	–	–	–	–	C	F	–	–	–	–	–	–	–	–	–	–	–	–	–	–	–	–	–	–	–	–	–	14	2	87.50%
19	Steady	3	(China)	Huang Yaqiong	6	55,050	✓	DC	–	–	–	QF	–	C	–	–	QF	DC	–	–	–	–	–	–	C	F	–	–	–	–	–	–	–	–	–	–	–	–	–	–	–	–	–	–	–	–	–	14	2	87.50%
Qualified by World Tour Finals Ranking
1	Steady	2	(China)	Jiang Zhenbang	15	110,410	✓	SF	–	–	–	SF	F	QF	–	–	SF	1R	–	–	–	–	–	–	QF	C	C	–	–	–	–	C	2R	–	–	C	–	QF	–	–	F	F	–	–	–	–	2R	45	11	80.36%
1	Steady	2	(China)	Wei Yaxin	15	110,410	✓	SF	–	–	–	SF	F	QF	–	–	SF	1R	–	–	–	–	–	–	QF	C	C	–	–	–	–	C	2R	–	–	C	–	QF	–	–	F	F	–	–	–	–	2R	45	11	80.36%
2	▲1	1	(China)	Feng Yanzhe	11	90,210	✗	–	–	–	–	1R	QF	–	–	–	C	SF	–	–	–	–	–	–	1R	QF	–	–	–	–	–	–	–	–	–	F	–	C	–	–	C	DC	–	–	–	–	C	41	6	71.93%
2	▲1	1	(China)	Huang Dongping	11	90,210	✗	–	–	–	–	1R	QF	–	–	–	C	SF	–	–	–	–	–	–	1R	QF	–	–	–	–	–	–	–	–	–	F	–	C	–	–	C	DC	–	–	–	–	C	41	6	71.93%
3	▼1	10	(Malaysia)	Goh Soon Huat	21	81,040	✓	SF	–	–	–	2R	QF	2R	2R	QF	1R	2R	–	C	–	1R	1R	C	2R	1R	–	–	–	–	–	1R	QF	–	–	QF	–	F	–	–	SF	1R	–	–	–	SF	1R	33	19	63.46%
3	▼1	10	(Malaysia)	Shevon Jemie Lai	21	81,040	✓	SF	–	–	–	2R	QF	2R	2R	QF	1R	2R	–	C	–	1R	1R	C	2R	1R	–	–	–	–	–	1R	QF	–	–	QF	–	F	–	–	SF	1R	–	–	–	SF	1R	33	19	63.46%
4	Steady	8	(Malaysia)	Chen Tang Jie	16	80,980	✓	F	–	–	–	2R	2R	2R	F	–	2R	2R	–	F	–	–	–	SF	QF	1R	–	–	–	–	–	QF	C	–	–	SF	–	2R	–	–	–	–	–	–	–	2R	SF	33	15	68.75%
4	Steady	8	(Malaysia)	Toh Ee Wei	16	80,980	✓	F	–	–	–	2R	2R	2R	F	–	2R	2R	–	F	–	–	–	SF	QF	1R	–	–	–	–	–	QF	C	–	–	SF	–	2R	–	–	–	–	–	–	–	2R	SF	33	15	68.75%
5	▲2	6	(Hong Kong)	Tang Chun Man	14	78,520	✓	RR	–	–	–	1R	–	–	–	C	2R	QF	–	–	–	–	–	–	1R	QF	SF	–	–	–	–	F	–	–	–	SF	–	2R	QF	–	–	SF	–	–	–	2R	SF	32	15	68.09%
5	▲2	6	(Hong Kong)	Tse Ying Suet	14	78,520	✓	RR	–	–	–	1R	–	–	–	C	2R	QF	–	–	–	–	–	–	1R	QF	SF	–	–	–	–	F	–	–	–	SF	–	2R	QF	–	–	SF	–	–	–	2R	SF	32	15	68.09%
6	▼1	11	(Indonesia)	Dejan Ferdinansyah	18	78,050	✓	RR	C	QF	–	2R	1R	1R	QF	1R	2R	QF	–	2R	–	1R	QF	QF	2R	QF	–	–	–	1R	–	1R	1R	–	–	1R	–	SF	F	–	–	–	–	–	F	1R	QF	33	23	58.93%
6	▼1	11	(Indonesia)	Gloria Emanuelle Widjaja	18	78,050	✓	RR	C	QF	–	2R	1R	1R	QF	1R	2R	QF	–	2R	–	1R	QF	QF	2R	QF	–	–	–	1R	–	1R	1R	–	–	1R	–	SF	F	–	–	–	–	–	F	1R	QF	33	23	58.93%
7	▼1	12	(China)	Cheng Xing	19	75,870	✗	–	–	–	–	1R	2R	1R	2R	–	–	–	C	QF	–	F	2R	2R	–	–	–	–	1R	–	–	SF	SF	–	–	QF	–	SF	QF	–	SF	1R	–	–	SF	2R	2R	36	19	65.45%
7	▼1	12	(China)	Zhang Chi	19	75,870	✗	–	–	–	–	1R	2R	1R	2R	–	–	–	C	QF	–	F	2R	2R	–	–	–	–	1R	–	–	SF	SF	–	–	QF	–	SF	QF	–	SF	1R	–	–	SF	2R	2R	36	19	65.45%
8	▲1	14	(Chinese Taipei)	Yang Po-hsuan	19	71,040	✓	RR	–	–	–	–	1R	2R	2R	1R	2R	1R	–	–	–	–	–	2R	F	2R	–	F	–	–	–	2R	2R	–	C	2R	–	1R	–	–	–	2R	–	–	QF	1R	QF	26	18	59.09%
8	▲1	14	(Chinese Taipei)	Hu Ling-fang	19	71,040	✓	RR	–	–	–	–	1R	2R	2R	1R	2R	1R	–	–	–	–	–	2R	F	2R	–	F	–	–	–	2R	2R	–	C	2R	–	1R	–	–	–	2R	–	–	QF	1R	QF	26	18	59.09%
9	▲2	13	(China)	Guo Xinwa	13	69,050	✗	–	–	–	–	–	–	–	–	–	–	–	–	–	F	–	C	QF	2R	1R	F	–	–	–	–	–	–	–	–	QF	–	1R	C	–	1R	1R	–	–	C	SF	QF	33	11	75.00%
9	▲2	13	(China)	Chen Fanghui	13	69,050	✗	–	–	–	–	–	–	–	–	–	–	–	–	–	F	–	C	QF	2R	1R	F	–	–	–	–	–	–	–	–	QF	–	1R	C	–	1R	1R	–	–	C	SF	QF	33	11	75.00%
10	▼1	4	(South Korea)	Kim Won-ho	11	68,960	✗	–	–	–	–	F	SF	SF	–	F	QF	QF	–	–	–	–	–	–	1R	QF	–	–	–	–	–	1R	SF	–	–	–	–	–	–	–	–	SF	–	–	–	–	–	25	11	69.44%
10	▼1	4	(South Korea)	Jeong Na-eun	11	68,960	✗	–	–	–	–	F	SF	SF	–	F	QF	QF	–	–	–	–	–	–	1R	QF	–	–	–	–	–	1R	SF	–	–	–	–	–	–	–	–	SF	–	–	–	–	–	25	11	69.44%
11	▲5	18	(Malaysia)	Hoo Pang Ron	14	65,720	✗	–	–	–	–	–	–	–	2R	–	–	–	SF	1R	–	–	–	2R	1R	–	2R	–	–	–	–	–	1R	–	–	QF	–	QF	SF	–	QF	2R	–	–	–	QF	F	21	14	60.00%
11	▲5	18	(Malaysia)	Cheng Su Yin	14	65,720	✗	–	–	–	–	–	–	–	2R	–	–	–	SF	1R	–	–	–	2R	1R	–	2R	–	–	–	–	–	1R	–	–	QF	–	QF	SF	–	QF	2R	–	–	–	QF	F	21	14	60.00%
12	▼2	20	(Malaysia)	Tan Kian Meng	17	65,650	✗	–	–	–	–	1R	1R	QF	2R	QF	1R	2R	–	–	–	–	–	QF	2R	SF	SF	–	–	–	–	QF	2R	–	–	1R	–	2R	–	–	1R	2R	–	–	–	–	1R	20	18	52.63%
12	▼2	20	(Malaysia)	Lai Pei Jing	17	65,650	✗	–	–	–	–	1R	1R	QF	2R	QF	1R	2R	–	–	–	–	–	QF	2R	SF	SF	–	–	–	–	QF	2R	–	–	1R	–	2R	–	–	1R	2R	–	–	–	–	1R	20	18	52.63%
13	▼1	20	(Japan)	Hiroki Midorikawa	15	63,280	✓	RR	1R	–	–	QF	2R	F	SF	–	2R	1R	–	QF	–	–	–	–	–	1R	–	–	–	–	SF	2R	1R	–	–	–	–	QF	–	–	–	–	–	–	–	QF	1R	20	16	55.56%
13	▼1	20	(Japan)	Natsu Saito	15	63,280	✓	RR	1R	–	–	QF	2R	F	SF	–	2R	1R	–	QF	–	–	–	–	–	1R	–	–	–	–	SF	2R	1R	–	–	–	–	QF	–	–	–	–	–	–	–	QF	1R	20	16	55.56%
14	▼1	24	(Indonesia)	Rehan Naufal Kusharjanto	18	61,170	✗	–	–	–	–	2R	2R	QF	SF	SF	1R	1R	–	2R	–	QF	QF	QF	–	1R	1R	–	–	–	–	2R	2R	–	–	–	–	–	–	–	QF	2R	–	–	–	2R		23	18	56.10%
14	▼1	24	(Indonesia)	Lisa Ayu Kusumawati	18	61,170	✗	–	–	–	–	2R	2R	QF	SF	SF	1R	1R	–	2R	–	QF	QF	QF	–	1R	1R	–	–	–	–	2R	2R	–	–	–	–	–	–	–	QF	2R	–	–	–	2R		23	18	56.10%
15	▼1	19	(Indonesia)	Rinov Rivaldy	16	61,200	✗	–	–	–	–	1R	1R	2R	1R	1R	1R	–	F	1R	–	C	SF	F	–	1R	–	–	–	–	–	–	–	–	–	–	–	–	–	–	QF	QF	–	–	–	2R	–	23	14	62.16%
15	▼1	19	(Indonesia)	Pitha Haningtyas Mentari	16	61,200	✗	–	–	–	–	1R	1R	2R	1R	1R	1R	–	F	1R	–	C	SF	F	–	1R	–	–	–	–	–	–	–	–	–	–	–	–	–	–	QF	QF	–	–	–	2R	–	23	14	62.16%
