= 2026 Australian Open (badminton) =

2026 badminton tournament in Sydney

Tournament details
- Dates: 9–14 June
- Edition: 35th
- Level: Super 500
- Total prize money: US$500,000
- Venue: State Sports Centre
- Location: Sydney, Australia

Champions
- Men's singles: (Indonesia) Alwi Farhan
- Women's singles: (Japan) Akane Yamaguchi
- Men's doubles: (China) Chen Boyang (China) Liu Yi
- Women's doubles: (China) Jia Yifan (China) Zhang Shuxian
- Mixed doubles: (China) Feng Yanzhe (China) Huang Dongping

The 2026 Australian Open (officially known as the Sathio Group Australian Open 2026 for sponsorship reasons) was a badminton tournament which took place at the State Sports Centre in Sydney, Australia, from 9 to 14 June 2026 and had a total prize of US$ 500,000.

== Tournament ==
The 2026 Australian Open is the fifteenth tournament in the 2026 BWF World Tour. It is a part of the Australian Open, which have been held since 1975. This tournament is organized by Badminton Australia with sanction from the BWF.

=== Venue ===
This tournament was held at the State Sports Centre in Sydney, Australia.

=== Point distribution ===
Below is the point distribution table for each phase of the tournament based on the BWF points system for the BWF World Tour Super 500 event.

Winner	Runner-up	3/4	5/8	9/16	17/32	33/64	65/128
9,200	7,800	6,420	5,040	3,600	2,220	880	430

=== Prize money ===
The total prize money for this tournament is US$500,000. The distribution of the prize money is in accordance with BWF regulations.

Event	Winner	Finalist	Semi-finals	Quarter-finals	Last 16
Singles	$37,500	$19,000	$7,250	$3,000	$1,750
Doubles	$39,500	$19,000	$7,000	$3,625	$1,875

== Men's singles ==
=== Seeds ===
1. (Chinese Taipei) Chou Tien-chen (second round)
2. (Chinese Taipei) Lin Chun-yi (second round)
3. (Indonesia) Alwi Farhan (champion)
4. (Singapore) Loh Kean Yew (withdrew)
5. (Chinese Taipei) Chi Yu-jen (first round)
6. (India) Ayush Shetty (withdrew)
7. (Japan) Yushi Tanaka (second round)
8. (Hong Kong) Lee Cheuk Yiu (second round)

=== Finals ===
Semi-finals
PFQ	(China) Dong Tianyao	21	9	21
(Indonesia) Zaki Ubaidillah	19	21	18
3	(Indonesia) Alwi Farhan	21	17	21
(Hong Kong) Jason Gunawan	11	21	9

Final
PFQ	(China) Dong Tianyao	13	13
3	(Indonesia) Alwi Farhan	21	21

=== Top half ===
==== Section 1 ====
First round
1	(Chinese Taipei) Chou T-c	12	21	21
(Chinese Taipei) Wang P-w	21	16	14
PFQ	(China) Dong TY	21	21
(Indonesia) A S Ginting	15	15
7	(Japan) Y Tanaka	21	14	21
PFQ	(China) Zhu XC	15	21	16
(Hong Kong) Ng K L	17	21	21
(Belgium) J Carraggi	21	7	15

Second round
1	(Chinese Taipei) Chou T-c	22	16	23
PFQ	(China) Dong TY	20	21	25
7	(Japan) Y Tanaka	19	9
(Hong Kong) Ng K L	21	21

Quarter-finals
PFQ	(China) Dong TY	22	21
(Hong Kong) Ng K L	20	19

==== Section 2 ====
First round
8	(Hong Kong) Lee C Y	18	21	21
Q3	(Malaysia) E Ewe	21	10	15
PFQ	(Thailand) K Wangcharoen	14	11
(Indonesia) Z Ubaidillah	21	21
SWM	(Republic of Ireland) N Nguyen	21	21
(Singapore) J Teh	18	11
(India) K George	19	21	15
(Malaysia) J Hoh	21	14	21

Second round
8	(Hong Kong) Lee C Y	19	15
(Indonesia) Z Ubaidillah	21	21
SWM	(Republic of Ireland) N Nguyen	17	19
(Malaysia) J Hoh	21	21

Quarter-finals
(Indonesia) Z Ubaidillah	21	21
(Malaysia) J Hoh	7	13

=== Bottom half ===
==== Section 3 ====
First round
(South Korea) Jeon H-j	22	21
Q1	(Chinese Taipei) Wang Y-k	20	16
Q4	(Malaysia) Lee Z J	13	22
SWM	(Chinese Taipei) Lee C-h	21	24
(Chinese Taipei) Su L-y	13	21	16
(Japan) M Koga	21	15	21
(Chinese Taipei) Liao J-f	13	12
3	(Indonesia) A Farhan	21	21

Second round
(South Korea) Jeon H-j	19	13
SWM	(Chinese Taipei) Lee C-h	21	21
(Japan) M Koga	22	16	9
3	(Indonesia) A Farhan	20	21	21

Quarter-finals
SWM	(Chinese Taipei) Lee C-h	18	15
3	(Indonesia) A Farhan	21	21

==== Section 4 ====
First round
(China) Hu ZA	21	21
Q2	(India) S Dayanand	8	10
(Chinese Taipei) Wang T-w	21	17	22
5	(Chinese Taipei) Chi Y-j	19	21	20
(Vietnam) Nguyễn H Đ	18	13
(Hong Kong) J Gunawan	21	21
(India) T Mannepalli	21	13	23
2	(Chinese Taipei) Lin C-y	18	21	25

Second round
(China) Hu ZA	11	21	21
(Chinese Taipei) Wang T-w	21	15	16
(Hong Kong) J Gunawan	21	21
2	(Chinese Taipei) Lin C-y	14	11

Quarter-finals
(China) Hu ZA	23	18	13
(Hong Kong) J Gunawan	21	21	21

== Women's singles ==
=== Seeds ===
1. (Japan) Akane Yamaguchi (champion)
2. (Thailand) Pornpawee Chochuwong (final)
3. (India) P. V. Sindhu (semi-finals)
4. (Japan) Nozomi Okuhara (semi-finals)
5. (Chinese Taipei) Chiu Pin-chian (first round)
6. (Chinese Taipei) Lin Hsiang-ti (quarter-finals)
7. (Thailand) Supanida Katethong (first round)
8. (Chinese Taipei) Huang Yu-hsun (quarter-finals)

=== Finals ===
Semi-finals
1	(Japan) Akane Yamaguchi	22	21
3	(India) P. V. Sindhu	20	12
4	(Japan) Nozomi Okuhara	18	21	12
2	(Thailand) Pornpawee Chochuwong	21	11	21

Final
1	(Japan) Akane Yamaguchi	22	21
2	(Thailand) Pornpawee Chochuwong	20	18

=== Top half ===
==== Section 1 ====
First round
1	(Japan) A Yamaguchi	21	21
(Chinese Taipei) Huang C-p	10	15
(Chinese Taipei) Pai Y-p	21	15	21
(Hong Kong) Lo S Y	14	21	13
5	(Chinese Taipei) Chiu P-c	12	20
(India) T Sharma	21	22
PFQ	(Thailand) Tonrug Saeheng	21	7	13
(India) M Bansod	15	21	21

Second round
1	(Japan) A Yamaguchi	21	21
(Chinese Taipei) Pai Y-p	10	14
(India) T Sharma	21	21
(India) M Bansod	13	15

Quarter-finals
1	(Japan) A Yamaguchi	21	21
(India) T Sharma	14	14

==== Section 2 ====
First round
3	(India) P. V. Sindhu	21	21
(Peru) I Castillo	13	11
(China) Han QX	20	21	14
(India) I Baruah	22	10	21
7	(Thailand) S Katethong	15	21	15
(Singapore) Yeo J M	21	18	21
(Chinese Taipei) Chen S-y	23	21
(Ukraine) P Buhrova	21	16

Second round
3	(India) P. V. Sindhu	22	21
(India) I Baruah	20	12
(Singapore) Yeo J M	2^{r}
(Chinese Taipei) Chen S-y	11

Quarter-finals
3	(India) P. V. Sindhu	21	21
(Chinese Taipei) Chen S-y	6	9

=== Bottom half ===
==== Section 3 ====
First round
(Chinese Taipei) Sung S-y	21	20	21
Q4	(Ukraine) Y Kantemyr	13	22	6
Q2	(New Zealand) S Li	11	12
6	(Chinese Taipei) Lin H-t	21	21
(Chinese Taipei) Tung C-t	21	21
Q1	(Hong Kong) Liang K W	17	18
PFQ	(Hungary) V Sándorházi	8	8
4	(Japan) N Okuhara	21	21

Second round
(Chinese Taipei) Sung S-y	9	15
6	(Chinese Taipei) Lin H-t	21	21
(Chinese Taipei) Tung C-t	14	12
4	(Japan) N Okuhara	21	21

Quarter-finals
6	(Chinese Taipei) Lin H-t	11	10
4	(Japan) N Okuhara	21	21

==== Section 4 ====
First round
(Malaysia) Wong L C	21	19	22
(India) A Kashyap	19	21	20
Q3	(United States) D Gupta	17	16
8	(Chinese Taipei) Huang Y-h	21	21
(India) T Hemanth	21	21
(United States) I Jaiswal	17	18
(United States) E Lin	11	16
2	(Thailand) P Chochuwong	21	21

Second round
(Malaysia) Wong L C	18	19
8	(Chinese Taipei) Huang Y-h	21	21
(India) T Hemanth	12	15
2	(Thailand) P Chochuwong	21	21

Quarter-finals
8	(Chinese Taipei) Huang Y-h	15	15
2	(Thailand) P Chochuwong	21	21

== Men's doubles ==
=== Seeds ===
1. (Indonesia) Fajar Alfian / Muhammad Shohibul Fikri (withdrew)
2. (China) Liang Weikeng / Wang Chang (semi-finals)
3. (Indonesia) Sabar Karyaman Gutama / Muhammad Reza Pahlevi Isfahani (final)
4. (China) Chen Boyang / Liu Yi (champions)
5. (Indonesia) Raymond Indra / Nikolaus Joaquin (withdrew)
6. (Chinese Taipei) Chiu Hsiang-chieh / Wang Chi-lin (first round)
7. (South Korea) Kang Min-hyuk / Ki Dong-ju (quarter-finals)
8. (Chinese Taipei) Lee Fang-chih / Lee Fang-jen (quarter-finals)

=== Finals ===
Semi-finals
3	(Indonesia) Sabar Karyaman Gutama (Indonesia) Muhammad Reza Pahlevi Isfahani	21	19	23
(Chinese Taipei) Chen Cheng-kuan (Chinese Taipei) Liu Kuang-heng	18	21	21
4	(China) Chen Boyang (China) Liu Yi	21	21
2	(China) Liang Weikeng (China) Wang Chang	12	18

Final
3	(Indonesia) Sabar Karyaman Gutama (Indonesia) Muhammad Reza Pahlevi Isfahani	15	19
4	(China) Chen Boyang (China) Liu Yi	21	21

=== Top half ===
==== Section 1 ====
First round
3	(Indonesia) S K Gutama (Indonesia) M R P Isfahani	23	21
(Singapore) D Wee (Singapore) H Wong	21	16
(Australia) P Halim (Australia) L Kurniawan	8	19
(England) Wang Y H (Australia) Xie ZW	21	21
8	(Chinese Taipei) Lee F-c (Chinese Taipei) Lee F-j	15	21	21
PFQ	(Chinese Taipei) Chen B-y (Chinese Taipei) Lu M-c	21	15	19
(India) A R Doddavarapu (India) A R Pochana	15	15
PFQ	(Australia) K Igawa (Australia) Ooi Y H	21	21

Second round
3	(Indonesia) S K Gutama (Indonesia) M R P Isfahani	21	21
(England) Wang Y H (Australia) Xie ZW	9	9
8	(Chinese Taipei) Lee F-c (Chinese Taipei) Lee F-j	21	21
PFQ	(Australia) K Igawa (Australia) Ooi Y H	6	14

Quarter-finals
3	(Indonesia) S K Gutama (Indonesia) M R P Isfahani	21	21
8	(Chinese Taipei) Lee F-c (Chinese Taipei) Lee F-j	17	11

==== Section 2 ====
First round
6	(Chinese Taipei) Chiu H-c (Chinese Taipei) Wang C-l	19	17
(Chinese Taipei) Chen C-k (Chinese Taipei) Liu K-h	21	21
(Indonesia) M P Erwiansyah (Indonesia) B Maulana	18	21
(Malaysia) Chia W J (Malaysia) Teo E Y	21	23
SWM	(India) H Amsakarunan (India) Arjun M. R.	21	21
(United States) A Q Lee (United States) S Xing	13	13
(Australia) M Owen (New Zealand) D Soedjasa	21	21
(Chinese Taipei) Su C-h (Chinese Taipei) Tang K-w	18	11

Second round
(Chinese Taipei) Chen C-k (Chinese Taipei) Liu K-h	13	21	21
(Malaysia) Chia W J (Malaysia) Teo E Y	21	18	17
SWM	(India) H Amsakarunan (India) Arjun M. R.	21	21
(Australia) M Owen (New Zealand) D Soedjasa	17	7

Quarter-finals
(Chinese Taipei) Chen C-k (Chinese Taipei) Liu K-h	21	16
SWM	(India) H Amsakarunan (India) Arjun M. R.	19	9^{r}

=== Bottom half ===
==== Section 3 ====
First round
(Hong Kong) Hung K C (Hong Kong) Lui C W	21	11	21
(Indonesia) A F Rayhan (Indonesia) D A Wahyudi	17	21	13
(Singapore) W Koh (Singapore) J Kubo	16	17
SWM	(China) Huang D (China) Liu Ya	21	21
(South Korea) Na S-s (South Korea) Wang C	21	21
Q1	(Australia) J Wang (Australia) C Yu	12	8
(South Korea) Kim G-j (South Korea) Kim S-r	14	14
4	(China) Chen BY (China) Liu Yi	21	21

Second round
(Hong Kong) Hung K C (Hong Kong) Lui C W	10	17
SWM	(China) Huang D (China) Liu Ya	21	21
(South Korea) Na S-s (South Korea) Wang C	19	20
4	(China) Chen BY (China) Liu Yi	21	22

Quarter-finals
SWM	(China) Huang D (China) Liu Ya	7	16
4	(China) Chen BY (China) Liu Yi	21	21

==== Section 4 ====
First round
Q3	(Australia) R Rajkumar (England) S Stallwood	13	11
(Thailand) P Sukphun (Thailand) P Teeraratsakul	21	21
(Australia) R Hidayat (Australia) F W Putra	14	11
7	(South Korea) Kang M-h (South Korea) Ki D-j	21	21
(Indonesia) L R Carnando (Indonesia) D Marthin	21	21
Q2	(Australia) A Ramadiansyah (Australia) F Zhao	18	7
Q4	(Australia) F Huang (Australia) F Trương	10	9
2	(China) Liang WK (China) Wang C	21	21

Second round
(Thailand) P Sukphun (Thailand) P Teeraratsakul	15	12
7	(South Korea) Kang M-h (South Korea) Ki D-j	21	21
(Indonesia) L R Carnando (Indonesia) D Marthin	15	18
2	(China) Liang WK (China) Wang C	21	21

Quarter-finals
7	(South Korea) Kang M-h (South Korea) Ki D-j	19	9
2	(China) Liang WK (China) Wang C	21	21

== Women's doubles ==
=== Seeds ===
1. (China) Jia Yifan / Zhang Shuxian (champions)
2. (Chinese Taipei) Hsieh Pei-shan / Hung En-tzu (first round)
3. (Bulgaria) Gabriela Stoeva / Stefani Stoeva (quarter-finals)
4. (Chinese Taipei) Hsu Yin-hui / Lin Jhih-yun (semi-finals)
5. (Indonesia) Rachel Allessya Rose / Febi Setianingrum (semi-finals)
6. (Chinese Taipei) Hsu Ya-ching / Sung Yu-hsuan (quarter-finals)
7. (Indonesia) Febriana Dwipuji Kusuma / Meilysa Trias Puspita Sari (final)
8. (Chinese Taipei) Chang Ching-hui / Yang Ching-tun (first round)

=== Finals ===
Semi-finals
1	(China) Jia Yifan (China) Zhang Shuxian	21	20	21
5	(Indonesia) Rachel Allessya Rose (Indonesia) Febi Setianingrum	16	22	16
4	(Chinese Taipei) Hsu Yin-hui (Chinese Taipei) Lin Jhih-yun	21	14	10
7	(Indonesia) Febriana Dwipuji Kusuma (Indonesia) Meilysa Trias Puspita Sari	15	21	21

Final
1	(China) Jia Yifan (China) Zhang Shuxian	24	21
7	(Indonesia) Febriana Dwipuji Kusuma (Indonesia) Meilysa Trias Puspita Sari	22	13

=== Top half ===
==== Section 1 ====
First round
1	(China) Jia YF (China) Zhang SX	21	21
(Australia) S Tjonadi (Australia) V Tjonadi	7	5
(United States) F Corbett (United States) J Gai	21	21
(Australia) G Somerville (Canada) J Wu	14	6
6	(Chinese Taipei) Hsu Y-c (Chinese Taipei) Sung Y-h	21	9	21
(China) Bao LJ (China) Cao ZH	19	21	12
(Thailand) H Mijad (Thailand) N Tungkasatan	8	18
Q1	(South Korea) Jung K-e (South Korea) Kim S-y	21	21

Second round
1	(China) Jia YF (China) Zhang SX	19	21	21
(United States) F Corbett (United States) J Gai	21	6	19
6	(Chinese Taipei) Hsu Y-c (Chinese Taipei) Sung Y-h	21	21
Q1	(South Korea) Jung K-e (South Korea) Kim S-y	16	15

Quarter-finals
1	(China) Jia YF (China) Zhang SX	21	18	21
6	(Chinese Taipei) Hsu Y-c (Chinese Taipei) Sung Y-h	13	21	15

==== Section 2 ====
First round
3	(Bulgaria) G Stoeva (Bulgaria) S Stoeva	21	21
Q4	(Australia) P Kustiadi (Australia) M Wijaya	6	7
(United States) A Chang (United States) J Yeung	19
(Chinese Taipei) Chen Y-f (Chinese Taipei) Sun L-c	14^{r}
5	(Indonesia) R A Rose (Indonesia) F Setianingrum	16	21	21
(South Korea) Kim Y-j (South Korea) Lee Y-l	21	16	15
(Hong Kong) Lui L L (Hong Kong) Tsang H Y	21	21
(New Zealand) L Cao (Australia) Y Zhang	8	3

Second round
3	(Bulgaria) G Stoeva (Bulgaria) S Stoeva	21	21
(United States) A Chang (United States) J Yeung	17	9
5	(Indonesia) R A Rose (Indonesia) F Setianingrum	26	21	21
(Hong Kong) Lui L L (Hong Kong) Tsang H Y	28	18	13

Quarter-finals
3	(Bulgaria) G Stoeva (Bulgaria) S Stoeva	15	12
5	(Indonesia) R A Rose (Indonesia) F Setianingrum	21	21

=== Bottom half ===
==== Section 3 ====
First round
Q3	(Australia) J Carrisia (Australia) F Huo	12	12
(Australia) L C Griselda (Australia) N Shimizu	21	21
(China) Luo Y (China) Wang TG	21	16	21
8	(Chinese Taipei) Chang C-h (Chinese Taipei) Yang C-t	14	21	17
(United States) L Lam (United States) A Lee	21	14	21
(Chinese Taipei) Hu L-f (Chinese Taipei) Jheng Y-c	13	21	5
(Chinese Taipei) Chen S-y (Chinese Taipei) C Han	12	7
4	(Chinese Taipei) Hsu Y-h (Chinese Taipei) Lin J-y	21	21

Second round
(Australia) L C Griselda (Australia) N Shimizu	9	12
(China) Luo Y (China) Wang TG	21	21
(United States) L Lam (United States) A Lee	18	25
4	(Chinese Taipei) Hsu Y-h (Chinese Taipei) Lin J-y	21	27

Quarter-finals
(China) Luo Y (China) Wang TG	9	21	9
4	(Chinese Taipei) Hsu Y-h (Chinese Taipei) Lin J-y	21	12	21

==== Section 4 ====
First round
(Ukraine) P Buhrova (Ukraine) Y Kantemyr	12	14
(Australia) S Mapasa (Australia) A Yu	21	15^{r}
(Hong Kong) Yeung N T (Hong Kong) Yeung P L	9	18
7	(Indonesia) F D Kusuma (Indonesia) M T Puspita Sari	21	21
(Australia) J Lam (Australia) Lim Y-y	21	21
Q2	(Australia) S Mushini (Australia) A Wong	9	13
(Malaysia) Low Z Y (Malaysia) N Maisarah	21	13	21
2	(Chinese Taipei) Hsieh P-s (Chinese Taipei) Hung E-t	19	21	19

Second round
(Ukraine) P Buhrova (Ukraine) Y Kantemyr	9	12
7	(Indonesia) F D Kusuma (Indonesia) M T Puspita Sari	21	21
(Australia) J Lam (Australia) Lim Y-y	9	18
(Malaysia) Low Z Y (Malaysia) N Maisarah	21	21

Quarter-finals
7	(Indonesia) F D Kusuma (Indonesia) M T Puspita Sari	21	21
(Malaysia) Low Z Y (Malaysia) N Maisarah	13	17

== Mixed doubles ==
=== Seeds ===
1. (China) Feng Yanzhe / Huang Dongping (champions)
2. (China) Guo Xinwa / Chen Fanghui (final)
3. (Thailand) Ruttanapak Oupthong / Jhenicha Sudjaipraparat (semi-finals)
4. (Chinese Taipei) Yang Po-hsuan / Hu Ling-fang (quarter-finals)
5. (United States) Presley Smith / Jennie Gai (semi-finals)
6. (India) Dhruv Kapila / Tanisha Crasto (withdrew)
7. (China) Gao Jiaxuan / Wei Yaxin (withdrew)
8. (Indonesia) Rehan Naufal Kusharjanto / Gloria Emanuelle Widjaja (quarter-finals)

=== Finals ===
Semi-finals
1	(China) Feng Yanzhe (China) Huang Dongping	21	18	21
5	(United States) Presley Smith (United States) Jennie Gai	16	21	7
3	(Thailand) Ruttanapak Oupthong (Thailand) Jhenicha Sudjaipraparat	9	21	17
2	(China) Guo Xinwa (China) Chen Fanghui	21	19	21

Final
1	(China) Feng Yanzhe (China) Huang Dongping	21	21
2	(China) Guo Xinwa (China) Chen Fanghui	17	19

=== Top half ===
==== Section 1 ====
First round
1	(China) Feng YZ (China) Huang DP	21	21
(South Korea) Kim J-y (South Korea) Lee Y-l	19	12
(Malaysia) Loo B K (Malaysia) N Maisarah	21	21
(Germany) C Devereux (Germany) D Toepffer	1	3
SWM	(Chinese Taipei) Wu G-x (Chinese Taipei) Lee C-h	12	14
(Japan) A Koga (Japan) N Saito	21	21
(India) D Rawat (India) K. Maneesha	21	21
PFQ	(Australia) J Lim (Australia) V Tjonadi	13	14

Second round
1	(China) Feng YZ (China) Huang DP	21	21
(Malaysia) Loo B K (Malaysia) N Maisarah	9	8
(Japan) A Koga (Japan) N Saito	21	21
(India) D Rawat (India) K. Maneesha	19	18

Quarter-finals
1	(China) Feng YZ (China) Huang DP	21	21
(Japan) A Koga (Japan) N Saito	14	18

==== Section 2 ====
First round
4	(Chinese Taipei) Yang P-hs (Chinese Taipei) Hu L-f	21	21
(Australia) F Zhao (Australia) J Lam	10	7
Q4	(Australia) F Trương (Australia) J Donald	8	11
PFQ	(Thailand) Tonk Saeheng (Thailand) Tonr Saeheng	21	21
5	(United States) P Smith (United States) J Gai	21	21
(Australia) R Agustino (Australia) P Kustiadi	9	10
(Chinese Taipei) Chen B-y (Chinese Taipei) Chen Y-f
(New Zealand) E Lau (New Zealand) S Li	w	/	o

Second round
4	(Chinese Taipei) Yang P-hs (Chinese Taipei) Hu L-f	21	21
PFQ	(Thailand) Tonk Saeheng (Thailand) Tonr Saeheng	11	10
5	(United States) P Smith (United States) J Gai	21	21
(New Zealand) E Lau (New Zealand) S Li	13	15

Quarter-finals
4	(Chinese Taipei) Yang P-hs (Chinese Taipei) Hu L-f	16	11
5	(United States) P Smith (United States) J Gai	21	21

=== Bottom half ===
==== Section 3 ====
First round
(Malaysia) Hoo P R (Malaysia) Lai P J	21	21
Q2	(Australia) M Owen (Australia) G Somerville	17	14
(Hong Kong) Chan Y C (Hong Kong) Ng T Y	21	21
SWM	(South Korea) Kim J-h (South Korea) Jang H-j	18	16
(Malaysia) J Wong (Malaysia) Cheng S Y	21	21
(Australia) A Ramadiansyah (Australia) N Shimizu	15	16
(Australia) T Elbert (Australia) S Kurniawan	11	17
3	(Thailand) R Oupthong (Thailand) J Sudjaipraparat	21	21

Second round
(Malaysia) Hoo P R (Malaysia) Lai P J	12	8
(Hong Kong) Chan Y C (Hong Kong) Ng T Y	21	21
(Malaysia) J Wong (Malaysia) Cheng S Y	15	21	20
3	(Thailand) R Oupthong (Thailand) J Sudjaipraparat	21	15	22

Quarter-finals
(Hong Kong) Chan Y C (Hong Kong) Ng T Y	15	19
3	(Thailand) R Oupthong (Thailand) J Sudjaipraparat	21	21

==== Section 4 ====
First round
Q3	(Australia) L Kurniawan (United States) J Yeung	9	10
(Chinese Taipei) Liu K-h (Chinese Taipei) Hsu Y-h	21	21
(Indonesia) R Rivaldy (Australia) J Gao	7	9
8	(Indonesia) R N Kusharjanto (Indonesia) G E Widjaja	21	21
Q1	(Australia) R Hidayat (Australia) L C Griselda	14	14
(Chinese Taipei) Wu H-y (Chinese Taipei) Yang C-y	21	21
(India) M Jaglan (India) L Jaglan	6	5
2	(China) Guo XW (China) Chen FH	21	21

Second round
(Chinese Taipei) Liu K-h (Chinese Taipei) Hsu Y-h	16	17
8	(Indonesia) R N Kusharjanto (Indonesia) G E Widjaja	21	21
(Chinese Taipei) Wu H-y (Chinese Taipei) Yang C-y	21	11	12
2	(China) Guo XW (China) Chen FH	11	21	21

Quarter-finals
8	(Indonesia) R N Kusharjanto (Indonesia) G E Widjaja	11	14
2	(China) Guo XW (China) Chen FH	21	21

Preceded by 2026 Indonesia Open	BWF World Tour; 2026 BWF season	Succeeded by 2026 Macau Open
