= 2025 Vietnam Open =

2025 badminton tournament

Tournament details
- Dates: 9–14 September
- Edition: 20th
- Level: Super 100
- Total prize money: US$110,000
- Venue: Nguyen Du Club
- Location: Ho Chi Minh City, Vietnam

Champions
- Men's singles: (Thailand) Panitchaphon Teeraratsakul
- Women's singles: (China) Cai Yanyan
- Men's doubles: (South Korea) Jin Yong (South Korea) Na Sung-seung
- Women's doubles: (China) Luo Yi (China) Wang Tingge
- Mixed doubles: (Indonesia) Marwan Faza (Indonesia) Aisyah Pranata

The 2025 Vietnam Open (officially known as the Yonex-Sunrise Vietnam Open 2025 for sponsorship reasons) was a badminton tournament which took place at Nguyen Du Club in Ho Chi Minh City, Vietnam, from 9 to 14 September 2025 and had a total purse of $110,000.

== Tournament ==
The 2025 Vietnam Open was the twenty-second tournament of the 2025 BWF World Tour and also part of the Vietnam Open championships, which had been held since 1996. This tournament is organized by the Vietnam Badminton Association and sanctioned by the BWF.

=== Venue ===
This tournament was held at Nguyen Du Club in Ho Chi Minh City, Vietnam.

=== Point distribution ===
Below is a table with the point distribution for each phase of the tournament based on the BWF points system for the BWF Tour Super 100 event.

Winner	Runner-up	3/4	5/8	9/16	17/32	33/64	65/128	129/256
5,500	4,680	3,850	3,030	2,110	1,290	510	240	100

=== Prize money ===
The total prize money for this tournament was US$110,000. Distribution of prize money was in accordance with BWF regulations.

Event	Winner	Finals	Semi-finals	Quarter-finals	Last 16
Singles	$8,250	$4,180	$1,595	$660	$385
Doubles	$8,690	$4,180	$1,540	$797.5	$412.5

== Men's singles ==
=== Seeds ===
1. (Japan) Takuma Obayashi (second round)
2. (Indonesia) Chico Aura Dwi Wardoyo (second round)
3. (India) Sathish Karunakaran (second round)
4. (Thailand) Kantaphon Wangcharoen (third round)
5. (Chinese Taipei) Huang Ping-hsien (semi-finals)
6. (France) Arnaud Merklé (final)
7. (Vietnam) Nguyễn Hải Đăng (quarter-finals)
8. (Thailand) Panitchaphon Teeraratsakul (champion)

=== Finals ===
Semi-finals
6	(France) Arnaud Merklé	21	21
5	(Chinese Taipei) Huang Ping-hsien	12	11
8	(Thailand) Panitchaphon Teeraratsakul	21	13	21
(China) Wang Zijun	13	21	15

Final
6	(France) Arnaud Merklé	16	10
8	(Thailand) Panitchaphon Teeraratsakul	21	21

=== Top half ===
==== Section 1 ====
First round
Q3	(China) Zhou XY	21	21
(Chinese Taipei) Lu C-h	16	8
(South Korea) Yoo T-b	9	21
Q2	(China) Dong TY	21	23
(Singapore) J Koh	21	21
(India) K Thangam	12	6
Q6	(Malaysia) Ong T E	13	16
(Malaysia) Lim M H	21	21

Second round
1	(Japan) T Obayashi	9	17
Q3	(China) Zhou XY	21	21
(Japan) S Ogawa	10	13
Q2	(China) Dong TY	21	21
6	(France) A Merklé	19	21	21
(Singapore) J Koh	21	11	8
(Japan) R Hatano	17	21	21
(Malaysia) Lim M H	21	16	13

Third round
Q3	(China) Zhou XY	21	21
Q2	(China) Dong TY	15	19
6	(France) A Merklé	21	22	21
(Japan) R Hatano	12	24	13

Quarter-finals
Q3	(China) Zhou XY	9	15
6	(France) A Merklé	21	21

==== Section 2 ====
First round
(Malaysia) Ong Z Y	21	21
(Germany) M Kicklitz	15	18
Q4	(South Korea) Lee Y-g	21	14	21
Q8	(Sri Lanka) R Hendahewa	18	21	13
(Chinese Taipei) Huang Y-k	22	21
Q7	(China) Liu YX	20	19
(Vietnam) Lê Đ P	9	15
(Malaysia) Kok J H	21	21

Second round
4	(Thailand) K Wangcharoen	21	21
(Malaysia) Ong Z Y	11	16
Q1	(Malaysia) Chua K S	13	22	17
Q4	(South Korea) Lee Y-g	21	20	21
5	(Chinese Taipei) Huang P-h	21	21
(Chinese Taipei) Huang Y-k	10	18
(Malaysia) E Ewe	21	5	18
(Malaysia) Kok J H	19	21	21

Third round
4	(Thailand) K Wangcharoen	17	15
Q4	(South Korea) Lee Y-g	21	21
5	(Chinese Taipei) Huang P-h	21	14	21
(Malaysia) Kok J H	7	21	18

Quarter-finals
Q4	(South Korea) Lee Y-g	12	21	17
5	(Chinese Taipei) Huang P-h	21	12	21

=== Bottom half ===
==== Section 3 ====
First round
(Chinese Taipei) Kuo K-l	21	21
PFQ	(Indonesia) H Kho	19	14
(Malaysia) S Lee	21	21
(Hong Kong) Chan Y C	14	16
(Chinese Taipei) Ting Y-c	7	13
(China) Hu ZA	21	21
(India) M Maisnam	18	13
(China) Zhu XC	21	21

Second round
(Chinese Taipei) Kuo K-l	21	21
(Thailand) W Wongsup-in	17	18
(Malaysia) S Lee	10	21
8	(Thailand) P Teeraratsakul	21	23
(China) Hu ZA	13	11
(Chinese Taipei) Wang P-w	21	21
(China) Zhu XC	21	21
3	(India) S Karunakaran	9	16

Third round
(Chinese Taipei) Kuo K-l	14	21	18
8	(Thailand) P Teeraratsakul	21	17	21
(Chinese Taipei) Wang P-w	21	21
(China) Zhu XC	14	18

Quarter-finals
8	(Thailand) P Teeraratsakul	22	7	21
(Chinese Taipei) Wang P-w	20	21	15

==== Section 4 ====
First round
(India) R Bharadwaj	14	4^{r}
(Thailand) P Arree	21	9
(Malaysia) Tan J J	17	26
(Chinese Taipei) Wang Y-k	21	28
Q5	(India) O Chaliha	21	8	17
(China) Wang ZJ	19	21	21
(India) R Mariswamy	16	21	19
(South Korea) Cho G-y	21	18	21

Second round
(Thailand) P Arree	21	16	18
(India) M Manjunath	14	21	21
(Chinese Taipei) Wang Y-k	16	15
7	(Vietnam) Nguyễn H Đ	21	21
(China) Wang ZJ	21	21
(Chinese Taipei) Liao J-f	7	13
(South Korea) Cho G-y	21	21
2	(Indonesia) C A Dwi Wardoyo	15	16

Third round
(India) M Manjunath	21	17	18
7	(Vietnam) Nguyễn H Đ	12	21	21
(China) Wang ZJ	21	21
(South Korea) Cho G-y	6	14

Quarter-finals
7	(Vietnam) Nguyễn H Đ	16	21	18
(China) Wang ZJ	21	15	21

== Women's singles ==
=== Seeds ===
1. (Vietnam) Nguyễn Thùy Linh (final)
2. (Thailand) Lalinrat Chaiwan (second round)
3. (India) Tanvi Sharma (quarter-finals)
4. (India) Aakarshi Kashyap (second round)
5. (India) Shriyanshi Valishetty (second round)
6. (Chinese Taipei) Huang Yu-hsun (second round)
7. (Thailand) Tidapron Kleebyeesun (second round)
8. (Chinese Taipei) Huang Ching-ping (first round)

=== Finals ===
Semi-finals
1	(Vietnam) Nguyễn Thùy Linh	21	21
Q4	(South Korea) Kim Min-ji	19	16
(China) Cai Yanyan	21	21
Q1	(India) Ashmita Chaliha	19	15

Final
1	(Vietnam) Nguyễn Thùy Linh	17	21
(China) Cai Yanyan	21	23

=== Top half ===
==== Section 1 ====
First round
1	(Vietnam) Nguyễn T L	21	21
(Chinese Taipei) Liang T-y	15	19
(Malaysia) Kisona S	21	21
(Chinese Taipei) Wang Y-s	17	16
8	(Chinese Taipei) Huang C-p	9	18
(Thailand) T Nithiittikrai	21	21
(Indonesia) B Prasista	16	11
(Indonesia) N Pratiwi	21	21

Second round
1	(Vietnam) Nguyễn T L	14	21	21
(Malaysia) Kisona S	21	12	10
(Thailand) T Nithiittikrai	21	21
(Indonesia) N Pratiwi	19	18

Quarter-finals
1	(Vietnam) Nguyễn T L	21	13	21
(Thailand) T Nithiittikrai	10	21	18

==== Section 2 ====
First round
4	(India) A Kashyap	21	21
(South Korea) Park G-e	14	14
Q2	(China) Xu WJ	21	21
(Chinese Taipei) Hsieh Y-e	14	17
7	(Thailand) T Kleebyeesun	21	21
(Malaysia) S Zulaikha	5	14
(Chinese Taipei) Tsai H-p	19	24	19
Q4	(South Korea) Kim M-j	21	22	21

Second round
4	(India) A Kashyap	11	14
Q2	(China) Xu WJ	21	21
7	(Thailand) T Kleebyeesun	19	12
Q4	(South Korea) Kim M-j	21	21

Quarter-finals
Q2	(China) Xu WJ	19	21	13
Q4	(South Korea) Kim M-j	21	15	21

=== Bottom half ===
==== Section 3 ====
First round
(China) Cai YY	21	21
(India) I Sharma	17	19
(India) T Hemanth	7	16
5	(India) S Valishetty	21	21
(Spain) C Azurmendi	17	18
(Chinese Taipei) Chen S-y	21	21
(Thailand) Y Ketklieng	13	21	13
3	(India) T Sharma	21	16	21

Second round
(China) Cai YY	16	21	21
5	(India) S Valishetty	21	9	10
(Chinese Taipei) Chen S-y	21	13	14
3	(India) T Sharma	13	21	21

Quarter-finals
(China) Cai YY	21	21
3	(India) T Sharma	10	17

==== Section 4 ====
First round
(Malaysia) Wong L C	21	21
(South Korea) Kim M-s	11	19
(India) S Lele	11	17
6	(Chinese Taipei) Huang Y-h	21	21
Q3	(Vietnam) Vũ T T	15	20
Q1	(India) A Chaliha	21	22
(Hong Kong) S Mehta	22	18	17
2	(Thailand) L Chaiwan	20	21	21

Second round
(Malaysia) Wong L C	21	22	21
6	(Chinese Taipei) Huang Y-h	19	24	13
Q1	(India) A Chaliha	21	15	21
2	(Thailand) L Chaiwan	18	21	15

Quarter-finals
(Malaysia) Wong L C	18	21	18
Q1	(India) A Chaliha	21	14	21

== Men's doubles ==
=== Seeds ===
1. (Chinese Taipei) He Zhi-wei / Huang Jui-hsuan (second round)
2. (Chinese Taipei) Lai Po-yu / Tsai Fu-cheng (first round)
3. (Singapore) Wesley Koh / Junsuke Kubo (second round)
4. (Malaysia) Chia Wei Jie / Lwi Sheng Hao (quarter-finals)
5. (South Korea) Jin Yong / Na Sung-seung (champions)
6. (Chinese Taipei) Su Ching-heng / Wu Guan-xun (second round)
7. (China) Chen Xujun / Guo Ruohan (final)
8. (Philippines) Solomon Padiz Jr. / Julius Villabrille (first round)

=== Finals ===
Semi-finals
Q1	(Chinese Taipei) Chen Sheng-fa (Chinese Taipei) Lu Chen	19	13
7	(China) Chen Xujun (China) Guo Ruohan	21	21
5	(South Korea) Jin Yong (South Korea) Na Sung-seung	21	21
(Chinese Taipei) Huang Tsung-i (Chinese Taipei) Lin Ting-yu	18	7

Final
7	(China) Chen Xujun (China) Guo Ruohan	10	14
5	(South Korea) Jin Yong (South Korea) Na Sung-seung	21	21

=== Top half ===
==== Section 1 ====
First round
1	(Chinese Taipei) He Z-w (Chinese Taipei) Huang J-h	21	21
(Thailand) T Madee (Thailand) W Sothon	19	18
Q1	(Chinese Taipei) Chen S-f (Chinese Taipei) Lu C	21	21
(Malaysia) B Goonting (Malaysia) Fazriq R	18	11
6	(Chinese Taipei) Su C-h (Chinese Taipei) Wu G-x	18	21	21
(Malaysia) Boon X Y (Malaysia) Lee Y B	21	19	18
(Vietnam) Nguyễn Đ H (Vietnam) Trần Đ M	21	11	21
(Singapore) D Wee (Singapore) H Wong	19	21	13

Second round
1	(Chinese Taipei) He Z-w (Chinese Taipei) Huang J-h	14	20
Q1	(Chinese Taipei) Chen S-f (Chinese Taipei) Lu C	21	22
6	(Chinese Taipei) Su C-h (Chinese Taipei) Wu G-x	20	22
(Vietnam) Nguyễn Đ H (Vietnam) Trần Đ M	22	24

Quarter-finals
Q1	(Chinese Taipei) Chen S-f (Chinese Taipei) Lu C	21	15	21
(Vietnam) Nguyễn Đ H (Vietnam) Trần Đ M	17	21	11

==== Section 2 ====
First round
4	(Malaysia) Chia W J (Malaysia) Lwi S H	21	21
(India) A Mohammad (India) D Konthoujam	19	18
Q4	(Malaysia) Beh C M (Malaysia) Choi J S	21	21
(Spain) D Franco (Spain) R Sanjurjo	12	15
7	(China) Chen XJ (China) Guo RH	21	21
(Chinese Taipei) Chan Y-l (Chinese Taipei) Chu B-r	13	14
(Malaysia) Lau Y S (Malaysia) Lim T J	21	14	21
(Chinese Taipei) Chiu T-h (Chinese Taipei) Lu C-y	18	21	18

Second round
4	(Malaysia) Chia W J (Malaysia) Lwi S H	22	21	21
Q4	(Malaysia) Beh C M (Malaysia) Choi J S	24	12	8
7	(China) Chen XJ (China) Guo RH	25	21
(Malaysia) Lau Y S (Malaysia) Lim T J	23	14

Quarter-finals
4	(Malaysia) Chia W J (Malaysia) Lwi S H	21	18
7	(China) Chen XJ (China) Guo RH	23	21

=== Bottom half ===
==== Section 3 ====
First round
Q2	(China) Xu HY (China) Zhang LJ	21	21
(Spain) R García (Spain) C Piris	13	10
(Chinese Taipei) Chen B-y (Chinese Taipei) Tang K-w	15	18
5	(South Korea) Jin Y (South Korea) Na S-s	21	21
Q3	(China) Hu KY (China) Lin XY	23	21
(India) Vip Kuvale (India) Vir Kuvale	21	17
(Thailand) A Sreepeaw (Thailand) W Thongsa-nga	18	17
3	(Singapore) W Koh (Singapore) J Kubo	21	21

Second round
Q2	(China) Xu HY (China) Zhang LJ	10	15
5	(South Korea) Jin Y (South Korea) Na S-s	21	21
Q3	(China) Hu KY (China) Lin XY	21	21
3	(Singapore) W Koh (Singapore) J Kubo	11	12

Quarter-finals
5	(South Korea) Jin Y (South Korea) Na S-s	21	21
Q3	(China) Hu KY (China) Lin XY	12	12

==== Section 4 ====
First round
(India) A Mohanty (India) A Pattanayak	8	8
(Thailand) P Kaosamaang (Thailand) T Punpanich	21	21
(China) Chen YR (China) Chen ZH	21	21
8	(Philippines) S Padiz Jr. (Philippines) J Villabrille	16	11
(Thailand) C Charoenkitamorn (Thailand) T Jintamuttha	22	14	13
(Chinese Taipei) Huang T-i (Chinese Taipei) Lin T-y	20	21	21
(Chinese Taipei) Lin C-y (Chinese Taipei) Lin Y-s	21	22
2	(Chinese Taipei) Lai P-y (Chinese Taipei) Tsai F-c	16	20

Second round
(Thailand) P Kaosamaang (Thailand) T Punpanich	21	17	21
(China) Chen YR (China) Chen ZH	19	21	18
(Chinese Taipei) Huang T-i (Chinese Taipei) Lin T-y	21	21
(Chinese Taipei) Lin C-y (Chinese Taipei) Lin Y-s	19	18

Quarter-finals
(Thailand) P Kaosamaang (Thailand) T Punpanich	21	14	10
(Chinese Taipei) Huang T-i (Chinese Taipei) Lin T-y	18	21	21

== Women's doubles ==
=== Seeds ===
1. (Thailand) Laksika Kanlaha / Phataimas Muenwong (second round)
2. (Malaysia) Ong Xin Yee / Carmen Ting (quarter-finals)
3. (India) Priya Konjengbam / Shruti Mishra (first round)
4. (Thailand) Tidapron Kleebyeesun / Nattamon Laisuan (first round)
5. (Chinese Taipei) Lin Xiao-min / Wang Yu-qiao (quarter-finals)
6. (Chinese Taipei) Lee Chih-chen / Lin Yen-yu (quarter-finals)
7. (Indonesia) Isyana Syahira Meida / Rinjani Kwinnara Nastine (first round)
8. (Chinese Taipei) Chen Su-yu / Hsieh Yi-en (quarter-finals)

=== Finals ===
Semi-finals
Q4	(China) Liu Jiayue (China) Wang Yiduo	21	21
(China) Bao Lijing (China) Li Huazhou	18	12
(Thailand) Hathaithip Mijad (Thailand) Napapakorn Tungkasatan	13	19
(China) Luo Yi (China) Wang Tingge	21	21

Final
Q4	(China) Liu Jiayue (China) Wang Yiduo	15	17
(China) Luo Yi (China) Wang Tingge	21	21

=== Top half ===
==== Section 1 ====
First round
1	(Thailand) L Kanlaha (Thailand) P Muenwong	21	21
(Vietnam) Huỳnh K M (Vietnam) Ngô T T	13	11
Q4	(China) Liu JY (China) Wang YD	22	21
(Chinese Taipei) Hung Y-e (Chinese Taipei) Wang Y-z	20	12
6	(Chinese Taipei) Lee C-c (Chinese Taipei) Lin Y-y	24	16	21
(Chinese Taipei) Chen Y-h (Chinese Taipei) Liu C-y	22	21	15
(Chinese Taipei) Chang Y-j (Chinese Taipei) Li Y-h	21	14	16
(Spain) N Carulla (Spain) C Jiménez	14	21	21

Second round
1	(Thailand) L Kanlaha (Thailand) P Muenwong	10	8
Q4	(China) Liu JY (China) Wang YD	21	21
6	(Chinese Taipei) Lee C-c (Chinese Taipei) Lin Y-y	17	21	21
(Spain) N Carulla (Spain) C Jiménez	21	10	13

Quarter-finals
Q4	(China) Liu JY (China) Wang YD	18	21	21
6	(Chinese Taipei) Lee C-c (Chinese Taipei) Lin Y-y	21	12	14

==== Section 2 ====
First round
4	(Thailand) T Kleebyeesun (Thailand) N Laisuan	19	15
(China) Bao LJ (China) Li HZ	21	21
(Vietnam) Nguyễn T N L (Vietnam) Thân V A	21	21
(India) P Panda (India) H Rout	12	8
8	(Chinese Taipei) Chen S-y (Chinese Taipei) Hsieh Y-e	23	15	21
PFQ	(Malaysia) Ho L E (Malaysia) A Yap	21	21	10
(Chinese Taipei) Hung H-e (Chinese Taipei) Tsai R-l	8	13
(Malaysia) Cheng S H (Malaysia) Tan Z Y	21	21

Second round
(China) Bao LJ (China) Li HZ	21	21
(Vietnam) Nguyễn T N L (Vietnam) Thân V A	8	10
8	(Chinese Taipei) Chen S-y (Chinese Taipei) Hsieh Y-e	5	21	21
(Malaysia) Cheng S H (Malaysia) Tan Z Y	21	13	18

Quarter-finals
(China) Bao LJ (China) Li HZ	21	21
8	(Chinese Taipei) Chen S-y (Chinese Taipei) Hsieh Y-e	13	17

=== Bottom half ===
==== Section 3 ====
First round
Q3	(Thailand) F Korpthammakit (Thailand) S S Wedler	15	21	21
(Chinese Taipei) Ko R-h (Chinese Taipei) Lee Y-h	21	12	17
Q1	(Chinese Taipei) Chen H-y (Chinese Taipei) Wang Y-y	13	16
5	(Chinese Taipei) Lin X-m (Chinese Taipei) Wang Y-q	21	21
(Chinese Taipei) Lin J-y (Chinese Taipei) Tsai H-p	21	11	14
(Chinese Taipei) Lin C-c (Chinese Taipei) Lin W-c	19	21	21
(Thailand) H Mijad (Thailand) N Tungkasatan	21	21
3	(India) P Konjengbam (India) S Mishra	17	7

Second round
Q3	(Thailand) F Korpthammakit (Thailand) S S Wedler	21	17	12
5	(Chinese Taipei) Lin X-m (Chinese Taipei) Wang Y-q	13	21	21
(Chinese Taipei) Lin C-c (Chinese Taipei) Lin W-c	15	19
(Thailand) H Mijad (Thailand) N Tungkasatan	21	21

Quarter-finals
5	(Chinese Taipei) Lin X-m (Chinese Taipei) Wang Y-q	19	21	17
(Thailand) H Mijad (Thailand) N Tungkasatan	21	16	21

==== Section 4 ====
First round
(Spain) P López (Spain) L Rodríguez	16	7
(China) Luo Y (China) Wang TG	21	21
(China) Ding KY (China) Shen SY	22	21
7	(Indonesia) I Meida (Indonesia) R Nastine	20	14
(Chinese Taipei) Chen Y-f (Chinese Taipei) Sun L-c	26	21
(Vietnam) Phạm T D L (Vietnam) Phạm T K	24	12
Q2	(India) S Narayanan (India) R Uthayasooriyan	8	10
2	(Malaysia) Ong X Y (Malaysia) C Ting	21	21

Second round
(China) Luo Y (China) Wang TG	21	13	21
(China) Ding KY (China) Shen SY	17	21	18
(Chinese Taipei) Chen Y-f (Chinese Taipei) Sun L-c	10	20
2	(Malaysia) Ong X Y (Malaysia) C Ting	21	22

Quarter-finals
(China) Luo Y (China) Wang TG	21	21
2	(Malaysia) Ong X Y (Malaysia) C Ting	17	13

== Mixed doubles ==
=== Seeds ===
1. (India) Sathish Karunakaran / Aadya Variyath (second round)
2. (Spain) Rubén García / Lucía Rodríguez (quarter-finals)
3. (Thailand) Ratchapol Makkasasithorn / Nattamon Laisuan (semi-finals)
4. (Indonesia) Marwan Faza / Aisyah Pranata (champions)
5. (China) Zhu Yijun / Li Qian (quarter-finals)
6. (Malaysia) Jimmy Wong / Lai Pei Jing (second round)
7. (China) Liao Pinyi / Tang Ruizhi (final)
8. (Denmark) Mathias Christiansen / Alexandra Bøje (second round)

=== Finals ===
Semi-finals
Q2	(China) Li Hongyi (China) Huang Kexin	13	21	17
4	(Indonesia) Marwan Faza (Indonesia) Aisyah Pranata	21	14	21
3	(Thailand) Ratchapol Makkasasithorn (Thailand) Nattamon Laisuan	21	13	18
7	(China) Liao Pinyi (China) Tang Ruizhi	18	21	21

Final
4	(Indonesia) Marwan Faza (Indonesia) Aisyah Pranata	21	21
7	(China) Liao Pinyi (China) Tang Ruizhi	16	14

=== Top half ===
==== Section 1 ====
First round
1	(India) S Karunakaran (India) A Variyath	21	21
(India) I Bhatnagar (India) A Balachandra	12	11
(Chinese Taipei) Chiu T-h (Chinese Taipei) Lin C-c	13	24	21
(Malaysia) Wee Y H (Malaysia) Chan W T	21	22	23
6	(Malaysia) J Wong (Malaysia) Lai P J	21	21
(Indonesia) Z Nabawi (Indonesia) J Rismawardani	16	8
Q2	(China) Li HY (China) Huang KX	21	21
(India) Nithin H. V. (India) S Narayanan	14	14

Second round
1	(India) S Karunakaran (India) A Variyath	17	24	11
(Malaysia) Wee Y H (Malaysia) Chan W T	21	22	21
6	(Malaysia) J Wong (Malaysia) Lai P J	16	15
Q2	(China) Li HY (China) Huang KX	21	21

Quarter-finals
(Malaysia) Wee Y H (Malaysia) Chan W T	20	12
Q2	(China) Li HY (China) Huang KX	22	21

==== Section 2 ====
First round
4	(Indonesia) M Faza (Indonesia) A Pranata	21	21
(Chinese Taipei) Wu G-x (Chinese Taipei) Lee C-h	15	11
(Indonesia) V Mulia (Indonesia) L Kusumawati	15	15
(Indonesia) B Setiabudi (Indonesia) M Oktavianti	21	21
5	(China) Zhu YJ (China) Li Q	22	21
(Chinese Taipei) He Z-w (Chinese Taipei) Sun L-c	20	14
(Vietnam) Trần Đ M (Vietnam) Phạm T K	18	19
PFQ	(Chinese Taipei) Ho W-h (Chinese Taipei) Chen Y-h	21	21

Second round
4	(Indonesia) M Faza (Indonesia) A Pranata	22	15	22
(Indonesia) B Setiabudi (Indonesia) M Oktavianti	20	21	20
5	(China) Zhu YJ (China) Li Q	21	21
PFQ	(Chinese Taipei) Ho W-h (Chinese Taipei) Chen Y-h	12	14

Quarter-finals
4	(Indonesia) M Faza (Indonesia) A Pranata	21	18	21
5	(China) Zhu YJ (China) Li Q	15	21	11

=== Bottom half ===
==== Section 3 ====
First round
(Chinese Taipei) Lai P-y (Chinese Taipei) Lin X-m	19	21	21
(Vietnam) Phạm V H (Vietnam) Thân V A	21	14	9
Q4	(Chinese Taipei) Huang T-i (Chinese Taipei) Wang Y-z	12	17
8	(Denmark) M Christiansen (Denmark) A Bøje	21	21
(Chinese Taipei) Huang J-h (Chinese Taipei) Chen Y-f	21	22	15
(Malaysia) Too M Y (Malaysia) Lee Y S	17	24	21
(Thailand) P Horbanluekit (Thailand) F Korpthammakit	19	18
3	(Thailand) R Makkasasithorn (Thailand) N Laisuan	21	21

Second round
(Chinese Taipei) Lai P-y (Chinese Taipei) Lin X-m	13	23	21
8	(Denmark) M Christiansen (Denmark) A Bøje	21	21	11
(Malaysia) Too M Y (Malaysia) Lee Y S	14	7
3	(Thailand) R Makkasasithorn (Thailand) N Laisuan	21	21

Quarter-finals
(Chinese Taipei) Lai P-y (Chinese Taipei) Lin X-m	18	22
3	(Thailand) R Makkasasithorn (Thailand) N Laisuan	21	24

==== Section 4 ====
First round
Q3	(China) Shen XY (China) Yang JY	15	19
(Indonesia) D Ferdinansyah (Indonesia) B Wardana	21	21
(Malaysia) Wee Y T (Malaysia) C San	14	18
7	(China) Liao PY (China) Tang RZ	21	21
Q1	(Thailand) T Punpanich (Thailand) H Mijad	21	21
(Chinese Taipei) Lu C (Chinese Taipei) Lin Y-y	14	16
(India) B Navaneeth (India) M Kshetrimayum	10	20
2	(Spain) R García (Spain) L Rodríguez	21	22

Second round
(Indonesia) D Ferdinansyah (Indonesia) B Wardana	17	13
7	(China) Liao PY (China) Tang RZ	21	21
Q1	(Thailand) T Punpanich (Thailand) H Mijad	15	14
2	(Spain) R García (Spain) L Rodríguez	21	21

Quarter-finals
7	(China) Liao PY (China) Tang RZ	21	20	21
2	(Spain) R García (Spain) L Rodríguez	15	22	12

Preceded by 2025 Baoji China Masters	BWF World Tour; 2025 BWF season	Succeeded by 2025 China Masters; 2025 Indonesia Masters Super 100 I
