= Shogo Ogawa =

Japanese badminton player (born 2001)

Personal information
- Native name: 小川 翔悟
- Born: 1 April 2001 (age 25) Miyazaki Prefecture, Japan
- Height: 1.78 m (5 ft 10 in)
- Weight: 70 kg (154 lb)

Sport
- Country: Japan
- Sport: Badminton
- Handedness: Right
- Coached by: Shu Wada

Men's singles
- Career record: 62 wins, 35 losses (63.92%)
- Highest ranking: 55 (11 March 2025)
- Current ranking: 71 (17 November 2026)
- BWF profile

Shogo Ogawa (小川 翔悟, Ogawa Shōgo; born 1 April 2001) is a Japanese badminton player. Born in Miyazaki Prefecture, he plays for the JTEKT Stingers and is a former member of the Japanese national team. Ogawa won his first BWF World Tour title at the Vietnam Open.

== Early career ==
Ogawa began playing badminton at the age of nine with the Miyazaki Bad Kids club. He attended Ikime Minami Junior High School and Nissho Gakuen High School, before enrolling in the Faculty of Economics at Hosei University.

While at university, Ogawa and his partner Daisuke Sano placed third in men's doubles at the 2021 All Japan Student Championship (Inter-Collegiate). The following year, he won the 2022 All Japan Student Mixed Doubles Championship with Miori Miya. Ogawa captained the university's men's badminton team. He received the 2022 Hosei University Supporter's Association Award.

== Career ==
After joining the JTEKT Stingers badminton team on 1 April 2023, Ogawa competed at the Mauritius International, where he won the men's doubles title with partner Daisuke Sano and finished as the runner-up in men's singles.

In May 2024, Ogawa was selected as a sparring partner for the Japanese national team at the Paris Olympics. He won his first BWF World Tour title at the 2024 Vietnam Open and also claimed the title at the Bendigo International. That same year, he secured runner-up finishes at both the Mexican International and the Sydney International. He reached his first Super 300 semifinal at the 2024 Syed Modi International, where he was defeated by Lakshya Sen.

Ogawa achieved a career-high ranking of world No. 55 on 11 March 2025. In the first half of the 2025 season, he was eliminated in the early rounds of all tournaments entered. His performance improved in September, reaching the quarterfinals of the Indonesia Masters Super 100 I. In November, he advanced to the semifinals of the Super 300 Korea Masters, defeating Zaki Ubaidillah in the quarterfinals before losing to the eventual champion, Jason Teh. Ogawa concluded his 2025 season at the Super 500 Australian Open. He defeated Srikanth Kidambi in the second round but was eliminated in the quarterfinals by Lin Chun-yi.

In July 2026, Ogawa secured another title by winning the Saipan International, defeating South Korea's Park Sang-yong in the final. The following month, he won the Malaysia International, defeating teammate Kosuke Masumoto.

== Achievements ==
=== BWF World Tour (1 title) ===
The BWF World Tour, which was announced on 19 March 2017 and implemented in 2018, is a series of elite badminton tournaments sanctioned by the Badminton World Federation (BWF). The BWF World Tours are divided into levels of World Tour Finals, Super 1000, Super 750, Super 500, Super 300 (part of the HSBC World Tour), and the BWF Tour Super 100.

Men's singles
Year	Tournament	Level	Opponent	Score	Result	Ref.
2024	Vietnam Open	Super 100	(China) Wang Zhengxing	21–19, 22–20	(gold) Winner	

=== BWF International Challenge/Series (4 titles, 3 runners-up) ===
Men's singles
Year	Tournament	Opponent	Score	Result	Ref.
2023	Mauritius International	(India) Kartikey Kumar	18–21, 17–21	(silver) Runner-up	
2024	Mexican International	(Japan) Ryoma Muramoto	21–16, 18–21, 16–21	(silver) Runner-up	
2024	Bendigo International	(Japan) Keisuke Fujiwara	21–18, 21–9	(gold) Winner	
2024	Sydney International	(Chinese Taipei) Huang Ping-hsien	14–21, 22–20, 14–21	(silver) Runner-up	
2026	Saipan International	(South Korea) Park Sang-yong	12–21, 21–19, 21–18	(gold) Winner	
2026	Malaysia International	(Japan) Kosuke Masumoto	21–17, 18–21, 21–15	(gold) Winner	

Men's doubles
Year	Tournament	Partner	Opponent	Score	Result	Ref.
2023	Mauritius International	(Japan) Daisuke Sano	(India) Hariharan Amsakarunan (India) Ruban Kumar	21–17, 21–16	(gold) Winner	

BWF International Challenge tournament
BWF International Series tournament

== Performance timeline ==
Key

W	Won	F	Finalist	SF	Semi-finalist
QF	Quarter-finalist	#R	Rounds 4, 3, 2, 1	RR	Round-robin stage
Q#	Qualification round	A	Absent	w/d	Withdrew
G	Gold	S	Silver	B	Bronze
NH	Not held	N/A	Not applicable	DNQ	Did not qualify

=== Individual competitions ===
Tournament	BWF World Tour				Best	Ref.
Tournament	2023	2024	2025	2026	Best	Ref.
Thailand Masters	A			Q1	Q1 ('26)	
German Open	A		Q2	A	Q2 ('25)	
Ruichang China Masters	A	1R	A		1R ('24)	
Taipei Open	A		1R	A	1R ('25)	
Thailand Open	A		Q1	A	Q1 ('25)	
Baoji China Masters	N/A	A	2R	2R	2R ('25, '26)	
Australian Open	A		QF	Q1	QF ('25)	
U.S. Open	A			QF	QF ('26)	
Canada Open	A		1R	2R	2R ('26)	
Vietnam Open	2R	W	2R	2R	W ('24)	
Korea Masters	A		SF	1R	SF ('25)	
Indonesia Masters Super 100	A	2R	QF	SF	SF ('26)	
Indonesia Masters Super 100	A	A	3R	2R	SF ('26)	
Malaysia Super 100	A		2R	QF	QF ('26)	
Korea Open	A			Q1	Q1 ('26)	
Japan Masters	A	Q1	2R	A	2R ('25)	
Kaohsiung Masters	1R	A	2R	2R	2R ('25, '26)	
Hong Kong Open	A			1R	1R ('26)	
Syed Modi International	A	SF	A		SF ('24)	
Year-end ranking	204	60	71		55	
Tournament	2023	2024	2025	2026	Best	Ref.

== Record against selected opponents ==
Record against Year-end Finals finalists, World Championships semi-finalists, and Olympic quarter-finalists. Accurate as of 9 June 2026.

Player	Matches	Win	Lost	Diff.
(Canada) Victor Lai	1	0	1	–1
(India) Srikanth Kidambi	1	1	0	+1
(India) Lakshya Sen	1	0	1	–1
(Malaysia) Lee Zii Jia	1	0	1	–1
(Singapore) Loh Kean Yew	1	0	1	–1
