= 2025 Indonesia Masters Super 100 I =

2025 badminton tournament in Indonesia

Tournament details
- Dates: 16–21 September
- Edition: 8th
- Level: Super 100
- Total prize money: US$110,000
- Venue: GOR Remaja Pekanbaru
- Location: Pekanbaru, Riau, Indonesia

Champions
- Men's singles: (Indonesia) Chico Aura Dwi Wardoyo
- Women's singles: (Chinese Taipei) Huang Yu-hsun
- Men's doubles: (South Korea) Jin Yong (South Korea) Na Sung-seung
- Women's doubles: (Chinese Taipei) Lin Xiao-min (Chinese Taipei) Wang Yu-qiao
- Mixed doubles: (Denmark) Mathias Christiansen (Denmark) Alexandra Bøje

The 2025 Indonesia Masters Super 100 I (officially known as the WONDR by BNI Indonesia Masters I 2025 for sponsorship reasons) was a badminton tournament which took place at GOR Remaja Pekanbaru in Pekanbaru, Riau, Indonesia, from 16 to 21 September 2025 and had a total purse of $110,000.

== Tournament ==
The 2025 Indonesia Masters Super 100 I was the twenty-fourth tournament of the 2025 BWF World Tour and also part of the Indonesia Masters Super 100 championships, which had been held since 2018. This tournament was organized by the Badminton Association of Indonesia and sanctioned by the BWF.

=== Venue ===
This tournament was held at GOR Remaja Pekanbaru in Pekanbaru, Riau, Indonesia.

=== Point distribution ===
Below is a table with the point distribution for each phase of the tournament based on the BWF points system for the BWF Tour Super 100 event.

Winner	Runner-up	3/4	5/8	9/16	17/32	33/64	65/128	129/256
5,500	4,680	3,850	3,030	2,110	1,290	510	240	100

=== Prize money ===
The total prize money for this tournament was US$110,000. Distribution of prize money was in accordance with BWF regulations.

Event	Winner	Finals	Semi-finals	Quarter-finals	Last 16
Singles	$8,250	$4,180	$1,595	$660	$385
Doubles	$8,690	$4,180	$1,540	$797.5	$412.5

== Men's singles ==
=== Seeds ===
1. (Canada) Victor Lai (semi-finals)
2. (South Korea) Jeon Hyeok-jin (final)
3. (Chinese Taipei) Su Li-yang (second round)
4. (India) Kiran George (second round)
5. (Japan) Takuma Obayashi (second round)
6. (Indonesia) Chico Aura Dwi Wardoyo (champion)
7. (India) Sathish Karunakaran (third round)
8. (China) Zhu Xuanchen (third round)

=== Finals ===
Semi-finals
1	(Canada) Victor Lai	19	10
6	(Indonesia) Chico Aura Dwi Wardoyo	21	21
(China) Hu Zhe'an	14	18
2	(South Korea) Jeon Hyeok-jin	21	21

Final
6	(Indonesia) Chico Aura Dwi Wardoyo	13	21	21
2	(South Korea) Jeon Hyeok-jin	21	9	17

=== Top half ===
==== Section 1 ====
First round
(Chinese Taipei) Kuo K-l	15	13
(South Korea) Yoo T-b	21	21
(Indonesia) P Shujiwo	18	21	21
(India) R Mariswamy	21	12	10
(Singapore) J Koh	17	21	21
(Germany) M Kicklitz	21	14	15
(India) M Manjunath	21	0
Q2	(China) Dong TY	15	0^{r}

Second round
1	(Canada) V Lai	15	21	21
(South Korea) Yoo T-b	21	16	19
(South Korea) Kim B-j	21	23
(Indonesia) P Shujiwo	16	21
7	(India) S Karunakaran	21	22
(Singapore) J Koh	13	20
(Japan) S Ogawa	19	21	23
(India) M Manjunath	21	12	21

Third round
1	(Canada) V Lai	21	16	21
(South Korea) Kim B-j	9	21	14
7	(India) S Karunakaran
(Japan) S Ogawa	w	/	o

Quarter-finals
1	(Canada) V Lai	21	21
(Japan) S Ogawa	11	16

==== Section 2 ====
First round
(India) M Singh	8	10
Q8	(China) Wang ZJ	21	21
(India) S Dayanand	11	10
(Chinese Taipei) Wang P-w	21	21
(Azerbaijan) D Pangestu	21	9	25
(Malaysia) Ong Z Y	16	21	27
PFQ	(Malaysia) S Lee	21	18	8
(Malaysia) E Ewe	16	21	21

Second round
3	(Chinese Taipei) Su L-y	17	21	18
Q8	(China) Wang ZJ	21	15	21
(Chinese Taipei) Huang P-h	14	21	15
(Chinese Taipei) Wang P-w	21	17	21
6	(Indonesia) C Dwi Wardoyo	21	21
(Malaysia) Ong Z Y	10	9
(Thailand) P Arree	21	13	21
(Malaysia) E Ewe	14	21	14

Third round
Q8	(China) Wang ZJ	13	21	15
(Chinese Taipei) Wang P-w	21	8	21
6	(Indonesia) C Dwi Wardoyo	21	21
(Thailand) P Arree	19	13

Quarter-finals
(Chinese Taipei) Wang P-w	21	19	8
6	(Indonesia) C Dwi Wardoyo	18	21	21

=== Bottom half ===
==== Section 3 ====
First round
(India) P Katta	23	21
(Denmark) M Christophersen	21	9
Q3	(China) Zhou XY	21	17	21
(Japan) R Hatano	18	21	14
(India) R Sanjeevi	17	20
(Japan) K Takahashi	21	22
(China) Hu ZA	21	21
(South Korea) Cho G-y	13	13

Second round
(India) P Katta	13	17
(Japan) R Takei	21	21
Q3	(China) Zhou XY	21	14	21
5	(Japan) T Obayashi	14	21	19
(Japan) K Takahashi	21	18	21
Q4	(Japan) T Noda	10	21	9
(China) Hu ZA	16	21	21
4	(India) K George	21	19	18

Third round
(Japan) R Takei	23	21
Q3	(China) Zhou XY	21	17
(Japan) K Takahashi	19	16
(China) Hu ZA	21	21

Quarter-finals
(Japan) R Takei	19	19
(China) Hu ZA	21	21

==== Section 4 ====
First round
(Indonesia) Y Marcellyno	21	21
(Thailand) W Wongsup-in	19	17
Q5	(Sri Lanka) R Hendahewa	8	21	14
(Malaysia) Tan J J	21	11	21
Q7	(Indonesia) B Oktora	21	21
(Indonesia) M Al Fajri	12	17
Q1	(Japan) Y Okimoto	21	21
(India) A Mishra	9	12

Second round
(Indonesia) Y Marcellyno	16	21	21
Q6	(South Korea) Lee Y-g	21	10	14
(Malaysia) Tan J J	11	22	14
8	(China) Zhu XC	21	20	21
Q7	(Indonesia) B Oktora	21	21
(France) A Merklé	8	12
Q1	(Japan) Y Okimoto	21	13	9
2	(South Korea) Jeon H-j	9	21	21

Third round
(Indonesia) Y Marcellyno	21	21	21
8	(China) Zhu XC	23	8	18
Q7	(Indonesia) B Oktora	21	19	16
2	(South Korea) Jeon H-j	8	21	21

Quarter-finals
(Indonesia) Y Marcellyno	7	18
2	(South Korea) Jeon H-j	21	21

== Women's singles ==
=== Seeds ===
1. (Japan) Nozomi Okuhara (quarter-finals)
2. (Thailand) Lalinrat Chaiwan (second round)
3. (India) Anmol Kharb (first round)
4. (Denmark) Amalie Schulz (first round)
5. (Canada) Wen Yu Zhang (first round)
6. (Azerbaijan) Keisha Fatimah Azzahra (first round)
7. (Chinese Taipei) Huang Ching-ping (second round)
8. (Chinese Taipei) Huang Yu-hsun (champion)

=== Finals ===
Semi-finals
8	(Chinese Taipei) Huang Yu-hsun	21	21
(Japan) Asuka Takahashi	13	18
(Japan) Sakura Masuki	21	21
(Chinese Taipei) Liang Ting-yu	12	16

Final
8	(Chinese Taipei) Huang Yu-hsun	16	21	21
(Japan) Sakura Masuki	21	18	13

=== Top half ===
==== Section 1 ====
First round
1	(Japan) N Okuhara	21	21
(South Korea) Park G-e	14	9
(Malaysia) Wong L C	16	23	10
Q3	(Indonesia) T Wiryawan	21	21	21
8	(Chinese Taipei) Huang Y-h	21	21
(Indonesia) Ruzana	11	12
(Malaysia) Kisona S	16	0^{r}
Q4	(Hong Kong) Liang K W	21	0

Second round
1	(Japan) N Okuhara	21	21
Q3	(Indonesia) T Wiryawan	11	11
8	(Chinese Taipei) Huang Y-h	23	17	21
Q4	(Hong Kong) Liang K W	21	21	16

Quarter-finals
1	(Japan) N Okuhara	10	23	24
8	(Chinese Taipei) Huang Y-h	21	21	26

==== Section 2 ====
First round
4	(Denmark) A Schulz	21	15	12
(Japan) H Akechi	12	21	21
(Indonesia) N Pratiwi	21	10	19
Q2	(China) Xu WJ	13	21	21
7	(Chinese Taipei) Huang C-p	21	22
(Indonesia) M Puspitasari	18	20
(Japan) A Takahashi	20	21	21
Q1	(South Korea) Kim J-e	22	14	17

Second round
(Japan) H Akechi	16	15
Q2	(China) Xu WJ	21	21
7	(Chinese Taipei) Huang C-p	21	14	14
(Japan) A Takahashi	14	21	21

Quarter-finals
Q2	(China) Xu WJ	18	17
(Japan) A Takahashi	21	21

=== Bottom half ===
==== Section 3 ====
First round
(Thailand) T Kleebyeesun	13	21	20
(South Korea) Kim M-s	21	17	22
(India) T Mir	21	21
6	(Azerbaijan) K Azzahra	13	17
(Japan) S Masuki	21	21
PFQ	(Chinese Taipei) Hsieh Y-e	6	18
(Indonesia) C Handoyo	22	21
3	(India) A Kharb	20	15

Second round
(South Korea) Kim M-s	5	16
(India) T Mir	21	21
(Japan) S Masuki	21	17	21
(Indonesia) C Handoyo	17	21	16

Quarter-finals
(India) T Mir	17	12
(Japan) S Masuki	21	21

==== Section 4 ====
First round
(Chinese Taipei) Liang T-y	21	10	21
(India) I Sharma	19	21	18
(Indonesia) Y Susanto	23	21
5	(Canada) W Y Zhang	21	11
(Spain) C Azurmendi	13	22	13
(Indonesia) B Prasista	21	20	21
(Chinese Taipei) Chen S-y	6	21	18
2	(Thailand) L Chaiwan	21	19	21

Second round
(Chinese Taipei) Liang T-y	11	21	21
(Indonesia) Y Susanto	21	16	13
(Indonesia) B Prasista	21	21
2	(Thailand) L Chaiwan	17	18

Quarter-finals
(Chinese Taipei) Liang T-y	21	11	21
(Indonesia) B Prasista	12	21	18

== Men's doubles ==
=== Seeds ===
1. (India) Pruthvi Roy / K. Sai Pratheek (first round)
2. (Chinese Taipei) He Zhi-wei / Huang Jui-hsuan (quarter-finals)
3. (Chinese Taipei) Lai Po-yu / Tsai Fu-cheng (quarter-finals)
4. (Singapore) Wesley Koh / Junsuke Kubo (first round)
5. (South Korea) Jin Yong / Na Sung-seung (champions)
6. (Indonesia) Raymond Indra / Nikolaus Joaquin (semi-finals)
7. (Chinese Taipei) Chiang Chien-wei / Wu Hsuan-yi (first round)
8. (Japan) Kakeru Kumagai / Hiroki Nishi (final)

=== Finals ===
Semi-finals
6	(Indonesia) Raymond Indra (Indonesia) Nikolaus Joaquin	21	17	19
5	(South Korea) Jin Yong (South Korea) Na Sung-seung	18	21	21
(India) Hariharan Amsakarunan (India) Arjun M. R.	14	12
8	(Japan) Kakeru Kumagai (Japan) Hiroki Nishi	21	21

Final
5	(South Korea) Jin Yong (South Korea) Na Sung-seung	21	13	21
8	(Japan) Kakeru Kumagai (Japan) Hiroki Nishi	19	21	13

=== Top half ===
==== Section 1 ====
First round
1	(India) P Roy (India) K S Pratheek	17	21	16
(Hong Kong) Hung K C (Hong Kong) Lui C W	21	19	21
(Malaysia) Kang K X (Malaysia) A Tai	20	13
PFQ	(Chinese Taipei) Chen B-y (Chinese Taipei) Tang K-w	22	21
6	(Indonesia) R Indra (Indonesia) N Joaquin	21	21
(Malaysia) B Goonting (Malaysia) Fazriq R	9	16
(Indonesia) E Febryto (Indonesia) R Saputro	13	14
Q1	(Indonesia) A Mesdila (Indonesia) R Purnama	21	21

Second round
(Hong Kong) Hung K C (Hong Kong) Lui C W	16	21	8
PFQ	(Chinese Taipei) Chen B-y (Chinese Taipei) Tang K-w	21	18	21
6	(Indonesia) R Indra (Indonesia) N Joaquin	21	21
Q1	(Indonesia) A Mesdila (Indonesia) R Purnama	14	9

Quarter-finals
PFQ	(Chinese Taipei) Chen B-y (Chinese Taipei) Tang K-w	21	17	12
6	(Indonesia) R Indra (Indonesia) N Joaquin	19	21	21

==== Section 2 ====
First round
4	(Singapore) W Koh (Singapore) J Kubo	15	15
Q3	(Chinese Taipei) Chen S-f (Chinese Taipei) Lu C	21	21
(China) Chen XJ (China) Guo RH	19	21	18
(Chinese Taipei) Wei C-w (Chinese Taipei) Yang P-c	21	15	21
5	(South Korea) Jin Y (South Korea) Na S-s	21	21
(Chinese Taipei) Huang T-i (Chinese Taipei) Lin T-y	13	8
Q4	(China) Hu KY (China) Lin XY	21	21
(Japan) T Aizawa (Japan) D Sano	12	15

Second round
Q3	(Chinese Taipei) Chen S-f (Chinese Taipei) Lu C	18	21	14
(Chinese Taipei) Wei C-w (Chinese Taipei) Yang P-c	21	17	21
5	(South Korea) Jin Y (South Korea) Na S-s	17	21	24
Q4	(China) Hu KY (China) Lin XY	21	18	22

Quarter-finals
(Chinese Taipei) Wei C-w (Chinese Taipei) Yang P-c	15	15
5	(South Korea) Jin Y (South Korea) Na S-s	21	21

=== Bottom half ===
==== Section 3 ====
First round
(Singapore) D Wee (Singapore) H Wong	17	16
(Indonesia) P Erwiansyah (Indonesia) D Marvino	21	21
(India) H Amsakarunan (India) Arjun M. R.	21	21
7	(Chinese Taipei) Chiang C-w (Chinese Taipei) Wu H-y	18	17
(Spain) D Franco (Spain) R Sanjurjo	12	14
(Japan) M Onodera (Japan) D Tanioka	21	21
Q2	(China) Chen YR (China) Chen ZH	11	20
3	(Chinese Taipei) Lai P-y (Chinese Taipei) Tsai F-c	21	22

Second round
(Indonesia) P Erwiansyah (Indonesia) D Marvino	14	21	20
(India) H Amsakarunan (India) Arjun M. R.	21	19	22
(Japan) M Onodera (Japan) D Tanioka	16	24	12
3	(Chinese Taipei) Lai P-y (Chinese Taipei) Tsai F-c	21	22	21

Quarter-finals
(India) H Amsakarunan (India) Arjun M. R.	18	21	21
3	(Chinese Taipei) Lai P-y (Chinese Taipei) Tsai F-c	21	18	18

==== Section 4 ====
First round
(Chinese Taipei) Chiu T-h (Chinese Taipei) Lu C-y	21	19	22
(Indonesia) A Prasetya (Indonesia) P Ramadhan	19	21	20
(Spain) R García (Spain) C Piris	24	13	8
8	(Japan) K Kumagai (Japan) H Nishi	22	21	21
(Malaysia) Goh B Z (Malaysia) Wong V S	19	16
(Hong Kong) Law C H (Hong Kong) Yeung S C	21	21
(Malaysia) Lau Y S (Malaysia) Lim T J	21	19	13
2	(Chinese Taipei) He Z-w (Chinese Taipei) Huang J-h	15	21	21

Second round
(Chinese Taipei) Chiu T-h (Chinese Taipei) Lu C-y	15	21	9
8	(Japan) K Kumagai (Japan) H Nishi	21	19	21
(Hong Kong) Law C H (Hong Kong) Yeung S C	21	13	18
2	(Chinese Taipei) He Z-w (Chinese Taipei) Huang J-h	18	21	21

Quarter-finals
8	(Japan) K Kumagai (Japan) H Nishi	22	4
2	(Chinese Taipei) He Z-w (Chinese Taipei) Huang J-h	24	0^{r}

== Women's doubles ==
=== Seeds ===
1. (India) Priya Konjengbam / Shruti Mishra (quarter-finals)
2. (Thailand) Tidapron Kleebyeesun / Nattamon Laisuan (first round)
3. (Indonesia) Isyana Syahira Meida / Rinjani Kwinnara Nastine (quarter-finals)
4. (Chinese Taipei) Chen Su-yu / Hsieh Yi-en (first round)
5. (Chinese Taipei) Lin Xiao-min / Wang Yu-qiao (champions)
6. (Chinese Taipei) Chen Yan-fei / Sun Liang-ching (first round)
7. (Spain) Paula López / Lucía Rodríguez (second round)
8. (Canada) Catherine Choi / Wen Yu Zhang (first round)

=== Finals ===
Semi-finals
(China) Bao Lijing (China) Li Huazhou	11	21	15
5	(Chinese Taipei) Lin Xiao-min (Chinese Taipei) Wang Yu-qiao	21	11	21
(South Korea) Kim Min-ji (South Korea) Lee Ye-na	22	14	12
(Japan) Ririna Hiramoto (Japan) Kokona Ishikawa	20	21	21

Final
5	(Chinese Taipei) Lin Xiao-min (Chinese Taipei) Wang Yu-qiao	21	21
(Japan) Ririna Hiramoto (Japan) Kokona Ishikawa	17	9

=== Top half ===
==== Section 1 ====
First round
1	(India) P Konjengbam (India) S Mishra	21	12	21
(Thailand) P Aiamvareesrisakul (Thailand) S Janpeng	17	21	19
(Indonesia) V Christina (Indonesia) A Rahayu	21	11	14
(Chinese Taipei) Han C (Chinese Taipei) Hsu J-y	19	21	21
6	(Chinese Taipei) Chen Y-f (Chinese Taipei) Sun L-c	17	17
(China) Bao LJ (China) Li HZ	21	21
(Chinese Taipei) Chou Y-a (Chinese Taipei) Huang K-x	21	22
PFQ	(China) Ding KY (China) Shen SY	18	20

Second round
1	(India) P Konjengbam (India) S Mishra	21	15	21
(Chinese Taipei) Han C (Chinese Taipei) Hsu J-y	12	21	11
(China) Bao LJ (China) Li HZ	21	16	21
(Chinese Taipei) Chou Y-a (Chinese Taipei) Huang K-x	15	21	9

Quarter-finals
1	(India) P Konjengbam (India) S Mishra	21	16	10
(China) Bao LJ (China) Li HZ	19	21	21

==== Section 2 ====
First round
3	(Indonesia) I Meida (Indonesia) R Nastine	21	21
(Chinese Taipei) Hung Y-e (Chinese Taipei) Wang Y-z	16	12
(Malaysia) Ho L E (Malaysia) A Yap	21	19	21
(Chinese Taipei) Hung H-e (Chinese Taipei) Tsai R-l	19	21	18
5	(Chinese Taipei) Lin X-m (Chinese Taipei) Wang Y-q	21	21
Q2	(Chinese Taipei) Chang Y-j (Chinese Taipei) Li Y-h	10	11
(Malaysia) Cheng S H (Malaysia) Tan Z Y	27	21
(Indonesia) S Azzahra (Indonesia) A Ramadhani	25	16

Second round
3	(Indonesia) I Meida (Indonesia) R Nastine	22	21
(Malaysia) Ho L E (Malaysia) A Yap	20	11
5	(Chinese Taipei) Lin X-m (Chinese Taipei) Wang Y-q	21	21
(Malaysia) Cheng S H (Malaysia) Tan Z Y	12	12

Quarter-finals
3	(Indonesia) I Meida (Indonesia) R Nastine	20	19
5	(Chinese Taipei) Lin X-m (Chinese Taipei) Wang Y-q	22	21

=== Bottom half ===
==== Section 3 ====
First round
(South Korea) Kim M-j (South Korea) Lee Y-n	21	21
(Japan) H Suzuki (Japan) N Yamakita	11	12
(Malaysia) Chong J Y (Malaysia) V Ng	21	11	21
8	(Canada) C Choi (Canada) W Y Zhang	18	21	16
(Japan) M Kanehiro (Japan) R Kiyama	21	21
(Spain) N Carulla (Spain) C Jiménez	11	8
Q1	(South Korea) Jang E-s (South Korea) Kim Y-j	21	21
4	(Chinese Taipei) Chen S-y (Chinese Taipei) Hsieh Y-e	16	16

Second round
(South Korea) Kim M-j (South Korea) Lee Y-n	21	21
(Malaysia) Chong J Y (Malaysia) V Ng	14	14
(Japan) M Kanehiro (Japan) R Kiyama	21	21
Q1	(South Korea) Jang E-s (South Korea) Kim Y-j	17	10

Quarter-finals
(South Korea) Kim M-j (South Korea) Lee Y-n	21	21
(Japan) M Kanehiro (Japan) R Kiyama	17	11

==== Section 4 ====
First round
(Chinese Taipei) Chen Y-h (Chinese Taipei) Liu C-y	21	21
Q3	(Indonesia) R Anggraini (Indonesia) J Situmorang	12	10
(Chinese Taipei) Hsieh Y-t (Chinese Taipei) Lee Y-h	13	23
7	(Spain) P López (Spain) L Rodríguez	21	25
(Chinese Taipei) Chung C-e (Chinese Taipei) Wang Y-z	10	10
Q4	(China) Liu JY (China) Wang YD	21	21
(Japan) R Hiramoto (Japan) K Ishikawa	21	22
2	(Thailand) T Kleebyeesun (Thailand) N Laisuan	17	20

Second round
(Chinese Taipei) Chen Y-h (Chinese Taipei) Liu C-y	21	21
7	(Spain) P López (Spain) L Rodríguez	17	11
Q4	(China) Liu JY (China) Wang YD	21	12	13
(Japan) R Hiramoto (Japan) K Ishikawa	11	21	21

Quarter-finals
(Chinese Taipei) Chen Y-h (Chinese Taipei) Liu C-y	19	19
(Japan) R Hiramoto (Japan) K Ishikawa	21	21

== Mixed doubles ==
=== Seeds ===
1. (India) Sathish Karunakaran / Aadya Variyath (second round)
2. (Spain) Rubén García / Lucía Rodríguez (second round)
3. (Indonesia) Bobby Setiabudi / Melati Daeva Oktavianti (semi-finals)
4. (Thailand) Ratchapol Makkasasithorn / Nattamon Laisuan (quarter-finals)
5. (Malaysia) Jimmy Wong / Lai Pei Jing (final)
6. (Denmark) Mathias Christiansen / Alexandra Bøje (champions)
7. (Japan) Akira Koga / Yuho Imai (second round)
8. (Indonesia) Marwan Faza / Aisyah Salsabila Putri Pranata (quarter-finals)

=== Finals ===
Semi-finals
6	(Denmark) Mathias Christiansen (Denmark) Alexandra Bøje	21	21
3	(Indonesia) Bobby Setiabudi (Indonesia) Melati Daeva Oktavianti	14	8
5	(Malaysia) Jimmy Wong (Malaysia) Lai Pei Jing	21	14	21
Q2	(Hong Kong) Chan Yin Chak (Hong Kong) Ng Tsz Yau	9	21	15

Final
6	(Denmark) Mathias Christiansen (Denmark) Alexandra Bøje	13	23	21
5	(Malaysia) Jimmy Wong (Malaysia) Lai Pei Jing	21	21	14

=== Top half ===
==== Section 1 ====
First round
1	(India) S Karunakaran (India) A Variyath	21	21
(South Korea) Noh J-s (South Korea) Lee Y-n	19	14
Q3	(Malaysia) Loh Z H (Malaysia) N Maisarah	17	21	21
(Indonesia) V Mulia (Indonesia) L Kusumawati	21	10	18
6	(Denmark) M Christiansen (Denmark) A Bøje	21	21
Q4	(Chinese Taipei) Chen B-y (Chinese Taipei) Chou Y-a	12	18
(South Korea) Kim J-h (South Korea) Jang E-s	21	20	21
(Chinese Taipei) Ho W-h (Chinese Taipei) Chen Y-h	14	22	11

Second round
1	(India) S Karunakaran (India) A Variyath	14	16
Q3	(Malaysia) Loh Z H (Malaysia) N Maisarah	21	21
6	(Denmark) M Christiansen (Denmark) A Bøje	21	21
(South Korea) Kim J-h (South Korea) Jang E-s	10	15

Quarter-finals
Q3	(Malaysia) Loh Z H (Malaysia) N Maisarah	13	18
6	(Denmark) M Christiansen (Denmark) A Bøje	21	21

==== Section 2 ====
First round
3	(Indonesia) B Setiabudi (Indonesia) M Oktavianti	21	21
(Chinese Taipei) Lai P-y (Chinese Taipei) Lin X-m	10	18
(China) Liao PY (China) Tang RZ	21	21
(India) D Rawat (India) K. Maneesha	14	14
8	(Indonesia) M Faza (Indonesia) A Pranata	21	21
(India) Nithin H.V. (India) S Narayanan	17	16
(China) Zhu YJ (China) Li Q	21	22
(South Korea) Lee S-w (South Korea) Kim M-j	9	20

Second round
3	(Indonesia) B Setiabudi (Indonesia) M Oktavianti	21	17	21
(China) Liao PY (China) Tang RZ	15	21	15
8	(Indonesia) M Faza (Indonesia) A Pranata	21	22
(China) Zhu YJ (China) Li Q	18	20

Quarter-finals
3	(Indonesia) B Setiabudi (Indonesia) M Oktavianti	21	21	21
8	(Indonesia) M Faza (Indonesia) A Pranata	17	23	18

=== Bottom half ===
==== Section 3 ====
First round
(India) B Navaneeth (India) M Kshetrimayum	7	17
(Chinese Taipei) He Z-w (Chinese Taipei) Sun L-c	21	21
(Australia) K C Teoh (Australia) K Q Teoh	8	7
5	(Malaysia) J Wong (Malaysia) Lai P J	21	21
Q1	(China) Shen XY (China) Yang JY	17	21	18
PFQ	(Malaysia) Too M Y (Malaysia) Lee Y S	21	12	21
(Malaysia) Wee Y T (Malaysia) C San	19	17
4	(Thailand) R Makkasasithorn (Thailand) N Laisuan	21	21

Second round
(Chinese Taipei) He Z-w (Chinese Taipei) Sun L-c	19	8
5	(Malaysia) J Wong (Malaysia) Lai P J	21	21
PFQ	(Malaysia) Too M Y (Malaysia) Lee Y S	13	17
4	(Thailand) R Makkasasithorn (Thailand) N Laisuan	21	21

Quarter-finals
5	(Malaysia) J Wong (Malaysia) Lai P J	w	/	o
4	(Thailand) R Makkasasithorn (Thailand) N Laisuan

==== Section 4 ====
First round
(Malaysia) Wee Y H (Malaysia) Chan W T	11	13
(Indonesia) Z Nabawi (Indonesia) J Rismawardani	21	21
(Chinese Taipei) Huang J-h (Chinese Taipei) Chen Y-f	10	11
7	(Japan) A Koga (Japan) Y Imai	21	21
(Indonesia) D Ferdinansyah (Indonesia) B Wardana	19	19
Q2	(Hong Kong) Chan Y C (Hong Kong) Ng T Y	21	21
(India) S Kanapuram (India) R Sharma	20	14
2	(Spain) R García (Spain) L Rodríguez	22	21

Second round
(Indonesia) Z Nabawi (Indonesia) J Rismawardani	21	21
7	(Japan) A Koga (Japan) Y Imai	18	15
Q2	(Hong Kong) Chan Y C (Hong Kong) Ng T Y	23	21
2	(Spain) R García (Spain) L Rodríguez	21	13

Quarter-finals
(Indonesia) Z Nabawi (Indonesia) J Rismawardani	20	9
Q2	(Hong Kong) Chan Y C (Hong Kong) Ng T Y	22	21

Preceded by 2025 Hong Kong Open; 2025 Vietnam Open	BWF World Tour; 2025 BWF season	Succeeded by 2025 Korea Open; 2025 Kaohsiung Masters
