= 2024 Kaohsiung Masters =

Tournament details
- Dates: 18–23 June
- Edition: 2nd
- Level: Super 100
- Total prize money: US$100,000
- Venue: Kaohsiung Arena
- Location: Kaohsiung, Taiwan

Champions
- Men's singles: (Chinese Taipei) Lee Chia-hao
- Women's singles: (Chinese Taipei) Hsu Wen-chi
- Men's doubles: (Chinese Taipei) Chang Ko-chi (Chinese Taipei) Chen Xin-yuan
- Women's doubles: (Indonesia) Jesita Putri Miantoro (Indonesia) Febi Setianingrum
- Mixed doubles: (Thailand) Ruttanapak Oupthong (Thailand) Jhenicha Sudjaipraparat

The 2024 Kaohsiung Masters, officially the Victor Kaohsiung Masters 2024, was a badminton tournament which took place at the Kaohsiung Arena in Kaohsiung, Taiwan from 18 to 23 June 2024 and had a total prize of $100,000.

== Tournament ==
The 2024 Kaohsiung Masters was the seventeenth tournament of the 2024 BWF World Tour. This was the second edition of Kaohsiung Masters. This tournament was organized by Chinese Taipei Badminton Association and sanctioned by the BWF.

=== Venue ===
This international tournament was held at the Kaohsiung Arena in Kaohsiung, Taiwan.

=== Point distribution ===
Below is a table with the point distribution for each phase of the tournament based on the BWF points system for the BWF Tour Super 100 event.

Winner	Runner-up	3/4	5/8	9/16	17/32	33/64	65/128	129/256
5,500	4,680	3,850	3,030	2,110	1,290	510	240	100

=== Prize money ===
The total prize money for this tournament is US$100,000. Distribution of prize money is in accordance with BWF regulations.

Event	Winner	Finals	Semi-finals	Quarter-finals	Last 16
Singles	$7,500	$3,800	$1,450	$600	$350
Doubles	$7,900	$3,800	$1,400	$725	$375

== Men's singles ==
=== Seeds ===
1. (Chinese Taipei) Lin Chun-yi (withdrew)
2. (Chinese Taipei) Wang Tzu-wei (semi-final)
3. (Chinese Taipei) Su Li-yang (second round)
4. (Chinese Taipei) Lee Chia-hao (champion)
5. (Chinese Taipei) Chi Yu-jen (third round)
6. (Malaysia) Cheam June Wei (final)
7. (Indonesia) Alwi Farhan (quarter-finals)
8. (Hong Kong) Jason Gunawan (quarter-finals)

=== Finals ===
Semi-finals
Q3	(Chinese Taipei) Cheng Kai	12	17
6	(Malaysia) Cheam June Wei	21	21
4	(Chinese Taipei) Lee Chia-hao	21	21
2	(Chinese Taipei) Wang Tzu-wei	10	15

Final
6	(Malaysia) Cheam June Wei	15	12
4	(Chinese Taipei) Lee Chia-hao	21	21

=== Top half ===
==== Section 1 ====
First round
Q3	(Chinese Taipei) Cheng K	21	21
Q1	(India) K T Kavin	10	10
(Chinese Taipei) Chen C-t	21	21
(India) S Gupta	8	16
Q8	(Malaysia) Sie Z L	14	12
(Indonesia) I Rumbay	21	21
(India) B Raghav	5	13
(Hong Kong) Chan Y C	21	21

Second round
3	(Chinese Taipei) Su L-y	16	21	19
Q3	(Chinese Taipei) Cheng K	21	10	21
(Indonesia) S H Rhustavito	21	20	21
(Chinese Taipei) Chen C-t	17	22	16
7	(Indonesia) A Farhan	21	21
(Indonesia) I Rumbay	15	19
(India) M L Maisnam	5	21	21
(Hong Kong) Chan Y C	21	12	14

Third round
Q3	(Chinese Taipei) Cheng K	22	21	23
(Indonesia) S H Rhustavito	24	13	21
7	(Indonesia) A Farhan	22	21
(India) M L Maisnam	20	17

Quarter-finals
Q3	(Chinese Taipei) Cheng K	21	11	21
7	(Indonesia) A Farhan	17	21	17

==== Section 2 ====
First round
(Chinese Taipei) Liao J-f	21	15	21
(India) R Mariswamy	10	21	13
(Chinese Taipei) Yang Y	16	4^{r}
(Singapore) J Koh	21	11
(Australia) Jack Y	21	25
(Macau) Pui P F	12	23
(India) Sa Verma	18	19
Q7	(India) L R Kalagotla	21	21

Second round
6	(Malaysia) Cheam J W	22	21
(Chinese Taipei) Liao J-f	20	13
Q4	(Thailand) N Pusri	7	21	14
(Singapore) J Koh	21	18	21
(India) M Manjunath	12	15
(Australia) Jack Y	21	21
(United States) E Asuncion	14	14
Q7	(India) L R Kalagotla	21	21

Third round
6	(Malaysia) Cheam J W	21	21
(Singapore) J Koh	18	16
(Australia) Jack Y	21	10
Q7	(India) L R Kalagotla	23	21

Quarter-finals
6	(Malaysia) Cheam J W	21	21
Q7	(India) L R Kalagotla	16	19

=== Bottom half ===
==== Section 3 ====
First round
(Chinese Taipei) Ting Y-c	24	14
(Chinese Taipei) Huang Y	26	21
(Malaysia) Soong J V	21	21
PFQ	(Malaysia) Huan K H	7	16
(Malaysia) Ong Z Y	21	20	21
(India) H M Gowda	15	22	10
(Malaysia) Kok J H	19	21	21
Q5	(Chinese Taipei) Lu C-h	21	13	17

Second round
(Chinese Taipei) Huang Y	19	10
(Malaysia) J Hoh	21	21
(Malaysia) Soong J V	10	0^{r}
5	(Chinese Taipei) Chi Y-j	21	2
(Malaysia) Ong Z Y	21	21
(Chinese Taipei) Kuo K-l	19	19
(Malaysia) Kok J H	16	17
4	(Chinese Taipei) Lee C-h	21	21

Third round
(Malaysia) J Hoh	21	21
5	(Chinese Taipei) Chi Y-j	17	7
(Malaysia) Ong Z Y	18	17
4	(Chinese Taipei) Lee C-h	21	21

Quarter-finals
(Malaysia) J Hoh	18	16
4	(Chinese Taipei) Lee C-h	21	21

==== Section 4 ====
First round
(Vietnam) Lê Đ P	21	19	19
(Indonesia) Y S Marcellyno	19	21	21
Q6	(Thailand) K Laotrakul	21	21
(Malaysia) Chua K S	14	19
(India) A Yeligar	14	14
(Chinese Taipei) Tsai C-h	21	21
(Malaysia) E Ewe	26	24	21
(Indonesia) A W Chairullah	24	26	23

Second round
(Indonesia) Y S Marcellyno	21	21
Q2	(India) T R Katam	15	7
Q6	(Thailand) K Laotrakul	16	18
8	(Hong Kong) J Gunawan	21	21
(Chinese Taipei) Tsai C-h	20	7
PFQ	(Chinese Taipei) Huang P-h	22	21
(Indonesia) A W Chairullah	18	16
2	(Chinese Taipei) Wang T-w	21	21

Third round
(Indonesia) Y S Marcellyno	18	19
8	(Hong Kong) J Gunawan	21	21
PFQ	(Chinese Taipei) Huang P-h	16	14
2	(Chinese Taipei) Wang T-w	21	21

Quarter-finals
8	(Hong Kong) J Gunawan	19	14
2	(Chinese Taipei) Wang T-w	21	21

== Women's singles ==
=== Seeds ===
1. (Chinese Taipei) Sung Shuo-yun (first round)
2. (Chinese Taipei) Hsu Wen-chi (champion)
3. (Chinese Taipei) Pai Yu-po (final)
4. (Indonesia) Ester Nurumi Tri Wardoyo (quarter-finals)
5. (Myanmar) Thet Htar Thuzar (first round)
6. (Indonesia) Komang Ayu Cahya Dewi (semi-final)
7. (Chinese Taipei) Chiu Pin-chian (quarter-finals)
8. (Chinese Taipei) Liang Ting-yu (quarter-finals)

=== Finals ===
Semi-finals
(Chinese Taipei) Huang Yu-hsun	21	9	15
3	(Chinese Taipei) Pai Yu-po	11	21	21
6	(Indonesia) Komang Ayu Cahya Dewi	20	21	9^{r}
2	(Chinese Taipei) Hsu Wen-chi	22	18	14

Final
3	(Chinese Taipei) Pai Yu-po	20	18
2	(Chinese Taipei) Hsu Wen-chi	22	21

=== Top half ===
==== Section 1 ====
First round
1	(Chinese Taipei) Sung S-y	27	17
(Chinese Taipei) Huang Y-h	29	21
(Indonesia) A S Fatetani	21	11
Q1	(Indonesia) C M Handoyo	23	21
8	(Chinese Taipei) Liang T-y	21	21
PFQ	(India) J Ananthakumar	15	7
(Chinese Taipei) Huang C-p	22	21
(India) I Baruah	20	19

Second round
(Chinese Taipei) Huang Y-h	21	21
Q1	(Indonesia) C M Handoyo	14	17
8	(Chinese Taipei) Liang T-y	21	21
(Chinese Taipei) Huang C-p	14	16

Quarter-finals
(Chinese Taipei) Huang Y-h	24	21
8	(Chinese Taipei) Liang T-y	22	13

==== Section 2 ====
First round
3	(Chinese Taipei) Pai Y-p	21	21
(Malaysia) Kisona S	11	18
(Indonesia) Y Y Susanto	18	21	18
(Chinese Taipei) Tung C-t	21	18	21
5	(Myanmar) Thet Htar T	10	21	19
(Chinese Taipei) Lin H-t	21	13	21
Q3	(Vietnam) Vũ T T	21	21
Q2	(Indonesia) B Prasista	16	18

Second round
3	(Chinese Taipei) Pai Y-p	21	21
(Chinese Taipei) Tung C-t	13	4
(Chinese Taipei) Lin H-t	17	12
Q3	(Vietnam) Vũ T T	21	21

Quarter-finals
3	(Chinese Taipei) Pai Y-p	16	21	21
Q3	(Vietnam) Vũ T T	21	13	13

=== Bottom half ===
==== Section 3 ====
First round
(India) A Upadhyaya	20	15
(Chinese Taipei) Lee Y-h	22	21
(Chinese Taipei) Hung Y-t	10	21	21
6	(Indonesia) K A C Dewi	21	18	23
(Thailand) P Opatniputh	19	18
(India) K Mopati	21	21
(Chinese Taipei) Chen S-y	14	11
4	(Indonesia) E N T Wardoyo	21	21

Second round
(Chinese Taipei) Lee Y-h	14	8
6	(Indonesia) K A C Dewi	21	21
(India) K Mopati	5	19
4	(Indonesia) E N T Wardoyo	21	21

Quarter-finals
6	(Indonesia) K A C Dewi	21	21
4	(Indonesia) E N T Wardoyo	15	8

==== Section 4 ====
First round
(India) R Ramraj	21	18	21
(India) D Sihag	19	21	19
(Singapore) J Hooi	17	19
7	(Chinese Taipei) Chiu P-c	21	21
Q4	(Hong Kong) S S Mehta	21	13	9
(Chinese Taipei) Lin S-y	17	21	21
(Indonesia) Ruzana	19	16
2	(Chinese Taipei) Hsu W-c	21	21

Second round
(India) R Ramraj	21	9	11
7	(Chinese Taipei) Chiu P-c	16	21	21
(Chinese Taipei) Lin S-y	18	12
2	(Chinese Taipei) Hsu W-c	21	21

Quarter-finals
7	(Chinese Taipei) Chiu P-c	15	10
2	(Chinese Taipei) Hsu W-c	21	21

== Men's doubles ==
=== Seeds ===
1. (Chinese Taipei) Lee Jhe-huei / Yang Po-hsuan (first round)
2. (Chinese Taipei) Lee Fang-chih / Lee Fang-jen (second round)
3. (Chinese Taipei) Chiang Chien-wei / Wu Hsuan-yi (first round)
4. (Malaysia) Low Hang Yee / Ng Eng Cheong (semi-finals)
5. (Hong Kong) Law Cheuk Him / Yeung Shing Choi (first round)
6. (United States) Chen Zhi Yi / Presley Smith (first round)
7. (Chinese Taipei) Wei Chun-wei / Wu Guan-xun (first round)
8. (Chinese Taipei) Lin Bing-wei / Su Ching-heng (first round)

=== Finals ===
Semi-finals
(Chinese Taipei) Chen Zhi-ray (Chinese Taipei) Lin Yu-chieh	21	22
(Malaysia) Nur Mohd Azriyn Ayub (Malaysia) Tan Wee Kiong	16	20
4	(Malaysia) Low Hang Yee (Malaysia) Ng Eng Cheong	18	21	18
(Chinese Taipei) Chang Ko-chi (Chinese Taipei) Chen Xin-yuan	21	11	21

Final
(Chinese Taipei) Chen Zhi-ray (Chinese Taipei) Lin Yu-chieh	21	16	20
(Chinese Taipei) Chang Ko-chi (Chinese Taipei) Chen Xin-yuan	19	21	22

=== Top half ===
==== Section 1 ====
First round
1	(Chinese Taipei) Lee J-h (Chinese Taipei) Yang P-h	4^{r}
(Vietnam) Nguyễn Đ H (Vietnam) Trần Đ M	3
(Chinese Taipei) Chen C-k (Chinese Taipei) Chen S-f	19	21	21
(Malaysia) Lwi S H (Malaysia) J Wong	21	15	13
7	(Chinese Taipei) Wei C-w (Chinese Taipei) Wu G-x	19	21	19
(Chinese Taipei) Chen Z-r (Chinese Taipei) Lin Y-c	21	15	21
(Chinese Taipei) Bao Xin D G L W (Chinese Taipei) Lu C-y	21	21
(Chinese Taipei) Chen Y-c (Chinese Taipei) Yu H-c	17	14

Second round
(Vietnam) Nguyễn Đ H (Vietnam) Trần Đ M	13	11
(Chinese Taipei) Chen C-k (Chinese Taipei) Chen S-f	21	21
(Chinese Taipei) Chen Z-r (Chinese Taipei) Lin Y-c	21	21
(Chinese Taipei) Bao Xin D G L W (Chinese Taipei) Lu C-y	14	15

Quarter-finals
(Chinese Taipei) Chen C-k (Chinese Taipei) Chen S-f	17	12
(Chinese Taipei) Chen Z-r (Chinese Taipei) Lin Y-c	21	21

==== Section 2 ====
First round
3	(Chinese Taipei) Chiang C-w (Chinese Taipei) Wu H-y	13	19
(Malaysia) N M Azriyn Ayub (Malaysia) Tan W K	21	21
Q4	(Hong Kong) Hung K C (Hong Kong) Lui C W	17	21	21
(Chinese Taipei) Chan Y-l (Chinese Taipei) Chu B-r	21	19	14
6	(United States) Chen Z-y (United States) P Smith	13	16
(Chinese Taipei) Lu M-c (Chinese Taipei) Tang K-w	21	21
(Thailand) C Charoenkitamorn (Thailand) W Thongsa-nga	21	18	21
Q1	(Chinese Taipei) Lu C (Chinese Taipei) Po L-w	15	21	11

Second round
(Malaysia) N M Azriyn Ayub (Malaysia) Tan W K	21	21
Q4	(Hong Kong) Hung K C (Hong Kong) Lui C W	15	10
(Chinese Taipei) Lu M-c (Chinese Taipei) Tang K-w	28	19	21
(Thailand) C Charoenkitamorn (Thailand) W Thongsa-nga	26	21	10

Quarter-finals
(Malaysia) N M Azriyn Ayub (Malaysia) Tan W K	18	21	21
(Chinese Taipei) Lu M-c (Chinese Taipei) Tang K-w	21	14	13

=== Bottom half ===
==== Section 3 ====
First round
Q2	(Chinese Taipei) He Z-w (Chinese Taipei) Huang J-h	21	21
(Chinese Taipei) Chang K-h (Chinese Taipei) Tseng P-c	12	18
(Indonesia) R Hidayat (Indonesia) Y Rambitan	21	21
8	(Chinese Taipei) Lin B-w (Chinese Taipei) Su C-h	9	13
(Thailand) P Kaosamaang (Thailand) T Punpanich	15	21	16
(Malaysia) Boon X Y (Malaysia) Goh V S	21	12	21
(Indonesia) M Al Farizi (Indonesia) N Joaquin	17	12
4	(Malaysia) Low H Y (Malaysia) Ng E C	21	21

Second round
Q2	(Chinese Taipei) He Z-w (Chinese Taipei) Huang J-h	20	24	21
(Indonesia) R Hidayat (Indonesia) Y Rambitan	22	22	18
(Malaysia) Boon X Y (Malaysia) Goh V S	19	10
4	(Malaysia) Low H Y (Malaysia) Ng E C	21	21

Quarter-finals
Q2	(Chinese Taipei) He Z-w (Chinese Taipei) Huang J-h	16	8
4	(Malaysia) Low H Y (Malaysia) Ng E C	21	21

==== Section 4 ====
First round
(Indonesia) P Erwiansyah (Indonesia) T S C Hutomo	15	22	21
(Chinese Taipei) Lin C-y (Chinese Taipei) Lin Y-s	21	20	17
Q3	(Thailand) N Mangkornloi (Thailand) S Sae-ma	21	21
5	(Hong Kong) Law C H (Hong Kong) Yeung S C	19	14
(Chinese Taipei) Chang K-c (Chinese Taipei) Chen X-y	21	11	21
(Malaysia) Lau Y S (Malaysia) Lee Y B	16	21	14
(Malaysia) K Chok K W (Malaysia) A Y T Kok	13	11
2	(Chinese Taipei) Lee F-c (Chinese Taipei) Lee F-j	21	21

Second round
(Indonesia) P Erwiansyah (Indonesia) T S C Hutomo	19	21	21
Q3	(Thailand) N Mangkornloi (Thailand) S Sae-ma	21	11	15
(Chinese Taipei) Chang K-c (Chinese Taipei) Chen X-y	11	23	22
2	(Chinese Taipei) Lee F-c (Chinese Taipei) Lee F-j	21	21	20

Quarter-finals
(Indonesia) P Erwiansyah (Indonesia) T S C Hutomo	15	21	16
(Chinese Taipei) Chang K-c (Chinese Taipei) Chen X-y	21	17	21

== Women's doubles ==
=== Seeds ===
1. (Chinese Taipei) Chang Ching-hui / Yang Ching-tun (semi-finals)
2. (Chinese Taipei) Sung Shuo-yun / Yu Chien-hui (final)
3. (Indonesia) Jesita Putri Miantoro / Febi Setianingrum (champions)
4. (Chinese Taipei) Hsu Yin-hui / Lin Jhih-yun (second round)
5. (Indonesia) Lanny Tria Mayasari / Rachel Allessya Rose (quarter-finals)
6. (Chinese Taipei) Lin Wan-ching / Lin Xiao-min (first round)
7. (Chinese Taipei) Lin Chih-chun / Teng Chun-hsun (semi-finals)
8. (Chinese Taipei) Hsu Ya-ching / Liu Chiao-yun (quarter-finals)

=== Finals ===
Semi-finals
1	(Chinese Taipei) Chang Ching-hui (Chinese Taipei) Yang Ching-tun	19	21	19
3	(Indonesia) Jesita Putri Miantoro (Indonesia) Febi Setianingrum	21	16	21
7	(Chinese Taipei) Lin Chih-Chun (Chinese Taipei) Teng Chun-hsun	22	22
2	(Chinese Taipei) Sung Shuo-yun (Chinese Taipei) Yu Chien-hui	24	24

Final
3	(Indonesia) Jesita Putri Miantoro (Indonesia) Febi Setianingrum	21	21
2	(Chinese Taipei) Sung Shuo-yun (Chinese Taipei) Yu Chien-hui	14	18

=== Top half ===
==== Section 1 ====
First round
1	(Chinese Taipei) Chang C-h (Chinese Taipei) Yang C-t	21	20	21
(Chinese Taipei) Chen Y-h (Chinese Taipei) Chen Y-t	10	22	15
(Chinese Taipei) Lin Y-h (Chinese Taipei) Wang Y-q	9	13
(Malaysia) Go P K (Malaysia) Teoh M X	21	21
8	(Chinese Taipei) Hsu Y-c (Chinese Taipei) Liu C-y	27	14	21
(Chinese Taipei) N C Chan (Chinese Taipei) Yang C-y	25	21	14
Q4	(Vietnam) Phạm T D L (Vietnam) Phạm T K	14	25	21
(Chinese Taipei) Chen S-y (Chinese Taipei) Jiang Y-h	21	23	19

Second round
1	(Chinese Taipei) Chang C-h (Chinese Taipei) Yang C-t	24	16	21
(Malaysia) Go P K (Malaysia) Teoh M X	22	21	18
8	(Chinese Taipei) Hsu Y-c (Chinese Taipei) Liu C-y	21	21
(Vietnam) Phạm T D L (Vietnam) Phạm T K	10	17

Quarter-finals
1	(Chinese Taipei) Chang C-h (Chinese Taipei) Yang C-t	16	21	21
8	(Chinese Taipei) Hsu Y-c (Chinese Taipei) Liu C-y	21	17	13

==== Section 2 ====
First round
3	(Indonesia) J P Miantoro (Indonesia) F Setianingrum	21	21
(Chinese Taipei) Wang S-m (Chinese Taipei) Wu M-c	8	18
(Thailand) P Pattanawaritthipan (Thailand) A Povanon	10	21	22
(Hong Kong) Fan K Y (Hong Kong) Yau M Y	21	18	20
6	(Chinese Taipei) Lin W-c (Chinese Taipei) Lin X-m	18	17
(Thailand) N Aimsaard (Thailand) J Sudjaipraparat	21	21
(Chinese Taipei) Cheng Y-p (Chinese Taipei) Sun Y-h	16	18
(Chinese Taipei) Lee C-c (Chinese Taipei) Lin Y-y	21	21

Second round
3	(Indonesia) J P Miantoro (Indonesia) F Setianingrum	21	21
(Thailand) P Pattanawaritthipan (Thailand) A Povanon	14	10
(Thailand) N Aimsaard (Thailand) J Sudjaipraparat	17	15
(Chinese Taipei) Lee C-c (Chinese Taipei) Lin Y-y	21	21

Quarter-finals
3	(Indonesia) J P Miantoro (Indonesia) F Setianingrum	21	21
(Chinese Taipei) Lee C-c (Chinese Taipei) Lin Y-y	12	8

=== Bottom half ===
==== Section 3 ====
First round
Q2	(Malaysia) Ho L E (Malaysia) Tan Z Y	21	13	21
Q3	(Chinese Taipei) Chen Y-f (Chinese Taipei) Sun L-c	18	21	17
(Chinese Taipei) Hung H-e (Chinese Taipei) Hung Y-e	11	13
7	(Chinese Taipei) Lin C-c (Chinese Taipei) Teng C-h	21	21
(Chinese Taipei) Hu L-f (Chinese Taipei) Jheng Y-c	21	21
Q1	(Malaysia) Lee Z Q (Malaysia) Tio S X	18	12
(Chinese Taipei) Hsieh P-s (Chinese Taipei) Hung E-t	19	16
4	(Chinese Taipei) Hsu Y-h (Chinese Taipei) Lin J-y	21	21

Second round
Q2	(Malaysia) Ho L E (Malaysia) Tan Z Y	9	19
7	(Chinese Taipei) Lin C-c (Chinese Taipei) Teng C-h	21	21
(Chinese Taipei) Hu L-f (Chinese Taipei) Jheng Y-c	26	21	21
4	(Chinese Taipei) Hsu Y-h (Chinese Taipei) Lin J-y	28	18	15

Quarter-finals
7	(Chinese Taipei) Lin C-c (Chinese Taipei) Teng C-h	21	21
(Chinese Taipei) Hu L-f (Chinese Taipei) Jheng Y-c	10	18

==== Section 4 ====
First round
(Chinese Taipei) Lin Y-p (Chinese Taipei) Tseng Y-c	17	21	21
(Chinese Taipei) Hsieh Y-e (Chinese Taipei) Li Z-q	21	18	19
(Chinese Taipei) Chiu P-c (Chinese Taipei) Tung C-t	13	9
5	(Indonesia) L T Mayasari (Indonesia) R A Rose	21	21
(Chinese Taipei) Hsieh M-y (Chinese Taipei) Ko R-h	15	18
(Hong Kong) Lui L L (Hong Kong) Tsang H Y	21	21
(India) P Konjengbam (India) S Mishra	16	8
2	(Chinese Taipei) Sung S-y (Chinese Taipei) Yu C-h	21	21

Second round
(Chinese Taipei) Lin Y-p (Chinese Taipei) Tseng Y-c	13	21	14
5	(Indonesia) L T Mayasari (Indonesia) R A Rose	21	18	21
(Hong Kong) Lui L L (Hong Kong) Tsang H Y	21	14	9
2	(Chinese Taipei) Sung S-y (Chinese Taipei) Yu C-h	17	21	21

Quarter-finals
5	(Indonesia) L T Mayasari (Indonesia) R A Rose	21	18	13
2	(Chinese Taipei) Sung S-y (Chinese Taipei) Yu C-h	12	21	21

== Mixed doubles ==
=== Seeds ===
1. (Chinese Taipei) Yang Po-hsuan / Hu Ling-fang (final)
2. (Thailand) Ruttanapak Oupthong / Jhenicha Sudjaipraparat (champions)
3. (Chinese Taipei) Chen Cheng-kuan / Hsu Yin-hui (first round)
4. (Chinese Taipei) Wu Hsuan-yi / Yang Chu-yun (second round)
5. (Chinese Taipei) Chang Ko-chi / Lin Yen-yu (first round)
6. (Chinese Taipei) Lin Bing-wei / Lin Chih-chun (second round)
7. (Chinese Taipei) Wei Chun-wei / Nicole Gonzales Chan (first round)
8. (Chinese Taipei) Chen Zhi-ray / Yang Ching-tun (second round)

=== Finals ===
Semi-finals
1	(Chinese Taipei) Yang Po-hsuan (Chinese Taipei) Hu Ling-fang	21	21
(Chinese Taipei) Cheng Kai-wen (Chinese Taipei) Liu Chiao-yun	14	10
(Chinese Taipei) Po Li-wei (Chinese Taipei) Chang Ching-hui	9	9
2	(Thailand) Ruttanapak Oupthong (Thailand) Jhenicha Sudjaipraparat	21	21

Final
1	(Chinese Taipei) Yang Po-hsuan (Chinese Taipei) Hu Ling-fang	18	13
2	(Thailand) Ruttanapak Oupthong (Thailand) Jhenicha Sudjaipraparat	21	21

=== Top half ===
==== Section 1 ====
First round
1	(Chinese Taipei) Yang P-h (Chinese Taipei) Hu L-f	21	21
(Chinese Taipei) Chiang C-w (Chinese Taipei) Liao Y-c	16	10
(Vietnam) Pham V H (Vietnam) Thân V A	15	13
(Chinese Taipei) Tseng M-h (Chinese Taipei) Hsieh P-s	21	21
7	(Chinese Taipei) Wei C-w (Chinese Taipei) N G Chan	14	21	19
(Hong Kong) Lui C W (Hong Kong) Fu C Y	21	17	21
(Chinese Taipei) Lin C-y (Chinese Taipei) Lin X-m	18	21	17
(Chinese Taipei) He Z-w (Chinese Taipei) Sung Y-h	21	17	21

Second round
1	(Chinese Taipei) Yang P-h (Chinese Taipei) Hu L-f	23	21
(Chinese Taipei) Tseng M-h (Chinese Taipei) Hsieh P-s	21	11
(Hong Kong) Lui C W (Hong Kong) Fu C Y	21	21
(Chinese Taipei) He Z-w (Chinese Taipei) Sung Y-h	12	17

Quarter-finals
1	(Chinese Taipei) Yang P-h (Chinese Taipei) Hu L-f	21	21
(Hong Kong) Lui C W (Hong Kong) Fu C Y	19	15

==== Section 2 ====
First round
4	(Chinese Taipei) Wu H-y (Chinese Taipei) Yang C-y	21	21
(Chinese Taipei) Chan Y-l (Chinese Taipei) Li T-p	15	13
(Malaysia) Wong T C (Malaysia) Lim C S	21	21
(Chinese Taipei) Ting Y-c (Chinese Taipei) Wang Y-z	15	14
5	(Chinese Taipei) Chang K-c (Chinese Taipei) Lin Y-y	19	22	18
Q1	(Chinese Taipei) Yang M-t (Chinese Taipei) Jheng Y-c	21	20	21
(Chinese Taipei) Cheng K-w (Chinese Taipei) Liu C-y	20	21	21
(Malaysia) Wee Y H (Malaysia) V Gobi	22	19	12

Second round
4	(Chinese Taipei) Wu H-y (Chinese Taipei) Yang C-y	16	20
(Malaysia) Wong T C (Malaysia) Lim C S	21	22
Q1	(Chinese Taipei) Yang M-t (Chinese Taipei) Jheng Y-c	16	18
(Chinese Taipei) Cheng K-w (Chinese Taipei) Liu C-y	21	21

Quarter-finals
(Malaysia) Wong T C (Malaysia) Lim C S	16	18
(Chinese Taipei) Cheng K-w (Chinese Taipei) Liu C-y	21	21

=== Bottom half ===
==== Section 3 ====
First round
(Chinese Taipei) Chu B-r (Chinese Taipei) Tsai R-l	8	26	12
(Chinese Taipei) Po L-w (Chinese Taipei) Chang C-h	21	24	21
(Chinese Taipei) Huang J-h (Chinese Taipei) Chung K-y	17	21	16
6	(Chinese Taipei) Lin B-w (Chinese Taipei) Lin C-c	21	12	21
(Chinese Taipei) Chiu H-c (Chinese Taipei) Lin J-y	21	21
Q4	(Chinese Taipei) Lu C (Chinese Taipei) Lee C-c	14	19
(Chinese Taipei) Liao C-p (Chinese Taipei) Lin Y-h	15	21	23
3	(Chinese Taipei) Chen C-k (Chinese Taipei) Hsu Y-h	21	17	21

Second round
(Chinese Taipei) Po L-w (Chinese Taipei) Chang C-h	21	21
6	(Chinese Taipei) Lin B-w (Chinese Taipei) Lin C-c	15	10
(Chinese Taipei) Chiu H-c (Chinese Taipei) Lin J-y	21	21
(Chinese Taipei) Liao C-p (Chinese Taipei) Lin Y-h	11	14

Quarter-finals
(Chinese Taipei) Po L-w (Chinese Taipei) Chang C-h	22	18	21
(Chinese Taipei) Chiu H-c (Chinese Taipei) Lin J-y	20	21	13

==== Section 4 ====
First round
(Chinese Taipei) Chen B-y (Chinese Taipei) Hung E-t	21	21
Q2	(Chinese Taipei) Chen Y-c (Chinese Taipei) Wu M-c	14	15
(Thailand) N Mangkornloi (Thailand) A Povanon	16	15
8	(Chinese Taipei) Chen Z-r (Chinese Taipei) Yang C-t	21	21
(India) D S Konthoujam (India) P Konjengbam	23	21
Q3	(Chinese Taipei) Tseng P-c (Chinese Taipei) Sung Y-h	21	19
(Macau) Leong I C (Macau) Ng W C	16	15
2	(Thailand) R Oupthong (Thailand) J Sudjaipraparat	21	21

Second round
(Chinese Taipei) Chen B-y (Chinese Taipei) Hung E-t	18	21	21
8	(Chinese Taipei) Chen Z-r (Chinese Taipei) Yang C-t	21	11	19
(India) D S Konthoujam (India) P Konjengbam	13	17
2	(Thailand) R Oupthong (Thailand) J Sudjaipraparat	21	21

Quarter-finals
(Chinese Taipei) Chen B-y (Chinese Taipei) Hung E-t	18	15
2	(Thailand) R Oupthong (Thailand) J Sudjaipraparat	21	21

Preceded by 2024 Australian Open	BWF World Tour; 2024 BWF season	Succeeded by 2024 U.S. Open
