= Bilqis Prasista =

Indonesian badminton player (born 2003)

Personal information
- Born: 24 May 2003 (age 23) Magelang, Central Java, Indonesia

Sport
- Country: Indonesia
- Sport: Badminton
- Handedness: Right

Women's singles
- Career record: 51 wins, 38 losses
- Highest ranking: 78 (2 May 2023)
- BWF profile
Medal record
Women's badminton
Representing Indonesia
Asia Team Championships
Gold medal – first place	2022 Selangor	Women's team

Bilqis Prasista (born 24 May 2003) is an Indonesian badminton player affiliated with Djarum Badminton Club. She was invited to be part of Indonesia's national badminton team in 2020. She was part of the Indonesian women's winning team at the 2022 Asia Team Championships.

== Personal life ==
Prasista is the daughter of Joko Suprianto, a gold medalist at the 1993 World Championships in the men's singles, and Zelin Resiana, a former women's doubles bronze medalist at the 1997 World Championships. Both Suprianto and Resiana won the gold medal at the 1995 Badminton World Cup.

Her twin sister, Bilqis Pratista, is also a badminton player affiliated with Djarum Badminton Club.

== Career ==
In 2022, she beat the then reigning world champion and world number 1, Akane Yamaguchi, at the group stage of the 2022 Uber Cup.

In September 2023, she lost at the first round of Indonesia Masters Super 100 I from Indian player Mansi Singh.

== Achievements ==
=== BWF Junior International (1 title, 1 runner-up) ===
Girls' singles

Year	Tournament	Opponent	Score	Result	Ref
2021	Denmark Junior	(Thailand) Sirada Roongpiboonsopit	18–21, 17–21	(silver) Runner-up	
2021	Bangladesh Junior International Series	(Indonesia) Ruzana	21–14, 21–13	(gold) Winner	

BWF Junior International Grand Prix tournament
BWF Junior International Challenge tournament
BWF Junior International Series tournament
BWF Junior Future Series tournament

== Performance timeline ==
Key

W	F	SF	QF	#R	RR	Q#	A	G	S	B	NH	N/A	DNQ

(W) won; (F) finalist; (SF) semi-finalist; (QF) quarter-finalist; (#R) rounds 4, 3, 2, 1; (RR) round-robin stage; (Q#) qualification round; (A) absent; (G) gold, (S) silver or (B) bronze medal; (NH) not held; (N/A) not applicable; (DNQ) did not qualify.
To avoid confusion and double counting, these charts are updated at the conclusion of a tournament or when the player's participation has ended.

=== National team ===
- Senior level

Team events	2022	Ref
Uber Cup	QF	
Asia Team Championships	G	

=== Individual competitions ===
- Senior level

Tournament	BWF World Tour				Best	Ref
Tournament	2022	2023	2024	2025	Best	Ref
Thailand Masters	NA	A		Q2	Q2 ('25)	
Vietnam Open	A		Q2	1R	1R ('25)	
Indonesia Masters Super 100	2R	1R	2R	QF	QF ('25 I)	
Indonesia Masters Super 100	2R	2R	2R	1R	QF ('25 I)	
Kaohsiung Masters	NA	A	1R	A	1R ('24)	
Malaysia Super 100	NA	A	2R	A	2R ('24)	
Guwahati Masters	NA	1R	A		1R ('23)	
Odisha Masters	A	1R	A		1R ('23)	
Year-end ranking	116	113	132	143	78	
Tournament	2022	2023	2024	2025	Best	Ref
