= Sakura Masuki =

Japanese badminton player (born 2004)

Personal information
- Native name: 舛木 さくら
- Born: 17 March 2004 (age 22) Tochigi Prefecture, Japan
- Height: 1.62 m (5 ft 4 in)

Sport
- Country: Japan
- Sport: Badminton
- Handedness: Right
- Coached by: Kanta Tsuneyama

Women's singles
- Career record: 55 wins, 19 losses (74.32%)
- Highest ranking: 65 (23 September 2025)
- Current ranking: 73 (17 November 2026)
- BWF profile

Sakura Masuki (舛木 さくら, Masuki Sakura; born 17 March 2004) is a Japanese badminton player specializing in women's singles. A former member of the Japanese national team, she plays for the Hokuto Bank corporate badminton team under the coaching of former player Kanta Tsuneyama.

Masuki began competing on the senior international circuit in 2024, winning her maiden title at the Irish Open later that year. She has since won six titles on the BWF International Challenge circuit, including consecutive victories at the Northern Marianas Open in 2025 and 2026, the Saipan International, and the Indonesia International. On the BWF World Tour, she finished as runner-up at the 2025 Indonesia Masters Super 100 I. Masuki achieved a career-high world ranking of No. 65 in September 2025.

== Career ==
Masuki began playing badminton at age eight after her father introduced her to the sport. She played for Utsunomiya Chuo Junior and attended Kita Junior High School before entering Sakushin Gakuin High School, where she was the runner-up at the 2021 National High School Championships (Inter-High). After graduating, Masuki joined the Hokuto Bank badminton team to pursue professional badminton.

In 2024, Masuki was selected for the Japanese national team and began competing on the senior international circuit. In July, she reached the final of the Northern Marianas Open, finishing as the runner-up after losing to compatriot Kaoru Sugiyama. In November, she won her first international title at the Irish Open, defeating Canada's Rachel Chan in the final.

In 2025, Masuki began training under former Japanese men's singles player Kanta Tsuneyama as her coach. Under his guidance, she won two titles: the Mexican International in May, defeating Shiori Ebihara, and the Northern Marianas Open in August, defeating South Korea's Park Ga-eun. In September, Masuki reached her first BWF World Tour final at the Super 100 Indonesia Masters, where she finished as the runner-up to Taiwan's Huang Yu-hsun. Following the tournament, she achieved a career-high world ranking of No. 65 on 23 September 2025.

In July 2026, Masuki secured back-to-back titles in consecutive tournaments held in Saipan, Northern Mariana Islands. She successfully defended her women's singles title at the Northern Marianas Open and subsequently captured the Saipan International title, defeating compatriot Nodoka Sunakawa in both finals. Later that year, she captured the Indonesia International title by defeating Indonesia's Dalila Aghnia Puteri in straight games.

== Achievements ==
=== BWF World Tour (1 runner-up) ===
The BWF World Tour, which was announced on 19 March 2017 and implemented in 2018, is a series of elite badminton tournaments sanctioned by the Badminton World Federation (BWF). The BWF World Tour is divided into levels of World Tour Finals, Super 1000, Super 750, Super 500, Super 300, and the BWF Tour Super 100.

Women's singles
| Year | Tournament | Level | Opponent | Score | Result | Ref. |
|---|---|---|---|---|---|---|
| 2025 (I) | Indonesia Masters | Super 100 | (Chinese Taipei) Huang Yu-hsun | 21–16, 18–21, 13–21 | (silver) Runner-up | |

=== BWF International Challenge/Series (6 titles, 1 runner-up) ===
Women's singles
| Year | Tournament | Opponent | Score | Result | Ref. |
|---|---|---|---|---|---|
| 2024 | Northern Marianas Open | (Japan) Kaoru Sugiyama | 17–21, 15–21 | (silver) Runner-up | |
| 2024 | Irish Open | (Canada) Rachel Chan | 26–24, 21–10 | (gold) Winner | |
| 2025 | Mexican International | (Japan) Shiori Ebihara | 15–8, 15–10 | (gold) Winner | |
| 2025 | Northern Marianas Open | (South Korea) Park Ga-eun | 15–21, 21–11, 21–14 | (gold) Winner | |
| 2026 | Northern Marianas Open | (Japan) Nodoka Sunakawa | 21–15, 21–14 | (gold) Winner | |
| 2026 | Saipan International | (Japan) Nodoka Sunakawa | 21–13, 21–16 | (gold) Winner | |
| 2026 (II) | Indonesia International | (Indonesia) Dalila Aghnia Puteri | 21–13, 21–16 | (gold) Winner | |

BWF International Challenge tournament
