= Meiraba Maisnam =

Indian badminton player (born 2002)

Personal information
- Born: Meiraba Luwang Maisnam; 30 December 2002 (age 23) Imphal, Manipur, India
- Years active: 2021-present
- Height: 1.75 m (5 ft 9 in)

Sport
- Country: India
- Sport: Badminton
- Handedness: Right

Men's singles
- Highest ranking: 53 (24 January 2023)
- Current ranking: 62 (26 November 2024)
- BWF profile

Meiraba Maisnam (born 30 December 2002) is an Indian badminton player. He currently trains at Prakash Padukone Badminton Academy.

== Achievements ==
=== BWF International Challenge/Series (6 titles) ===
Men's singles
Year	Tournament	Opponent	Score	Result
2021	Latvia International	(France) Alex Lanier	21–15, 12–21, 22–20	(gold) Winner
2021	Bulgarian International	(Bulgaria) Daniel Nikolov	21–19, 7–21, 21–14	(gold) Winner
2022	Iran Fajr International	(Ukraine) Danylo Bosniuk	18–21, 21–13, 21–19	(gold) Winner
2022 (I)	India International	(India) Mithun Manjunath	21–14, 21–16	(gold) Winner
2024	Nepal International	(India) B. M. Rahul Bharadwaj	21–17, 21–16	(gold) Winner
2025	Bangladesh International	(India) Numair Shaik	21–7, 21–12	(gold) Winner

BWF International Challenge tournament
BWF International Series tournament
BWF Future Series tournament

=== BWF Junior International (4 titles, 1 runner-up) ===
Boys' singles
Year	Tournament	Opponent	Score	Result
2019	Russian Junior International	(India) Varun Kapur	21–5, 21–9	(gold) Winner
2019	India Junior International	(Malaysia) Ong Ken Yon	21–13, 19–21, 21–23	(silver) Runner-Up
2019	Korea Junior International	(South Korea) Lee Hak-joo	21–10, 21–13	(gold) Winner
2019	Bangladesh Junior International	(Malaysia) Ong Ken Yon	21–14, 21–18	(gold) Winner
2020	Nepal Junior International	(Nepal) Prince Dahal	21–16, 21–23, 21–15	(gold) Winner

BWF Junior International Grand Prix tournament
BWF Junior International Challenge tournament
BWF Junior International Series tournament
BWF Junior Future Series tournament

== Performance timeline ==
Key

W	Won	F	Finalist	SF	Semi-finalist
QF	Quarter-finalist	#R	Rounds 4, 3, 2, 1	RR	Round-robin stage
Q#	Qualification round	A	Absent	w/d	Withdrew
G	Gold	S	Silver	B	Bronze
NH	Not held	N/A	Not applicable	DNQ	Did not qualify

=== Individual competitions ===
- Senior level

Tournament	BWF World Tour					Best	Ref
Tournament	2022	2023	2024	2025	2026	Best	Ref
Swiss Open	A	Q2	A			Q2 ('23)	
Ruichang China Masters	NH	3R	A		1R	3R ('23)	
Orléans Masters	3R	Q1	Q1	A		3R ('22)	
Thailand Open	A	Q1	QF	A		QF ('24)	
Baoji China Masters	NH		3R	2R	QF	QF ('26)	
Macau Open	NH		A	Q2	A	Q2 ('25)	
Taipei Open	A	1R	A	1R	A	1R ('23, '25)	
Indonesia Masters Super 100	2R	1R	3R	A		3R ('24 I)	
Indonesia Masters Super 100	2R	A			1R	3R ('24 I)	
Vietnam Open	3R	2R	2R	1R	A	3R ('22)	
Malaysia Super 100	NH	1R	A		1R	1R ('23, '26)	
Kaohsiung Masters	NH	A	3R	A	1R	3R ('24)	
Syed Modi International	A	1R	QF	1R		QF ('24)	
Guwahati Masters	NH	3R	A	3R		3R ('23, '25)	
Odisha Masters	3R	QF	1R	A		QF ('23)	
Spain Masters	NH	Q1	A	NH		Q1 ('23)	
Year-end ranking	58	95	59	120		53	
Tournament	2022	2023	2024	2025	2026	Best	
