= Ruttanapak Oupthong =

Thai badminton player (born 2000)

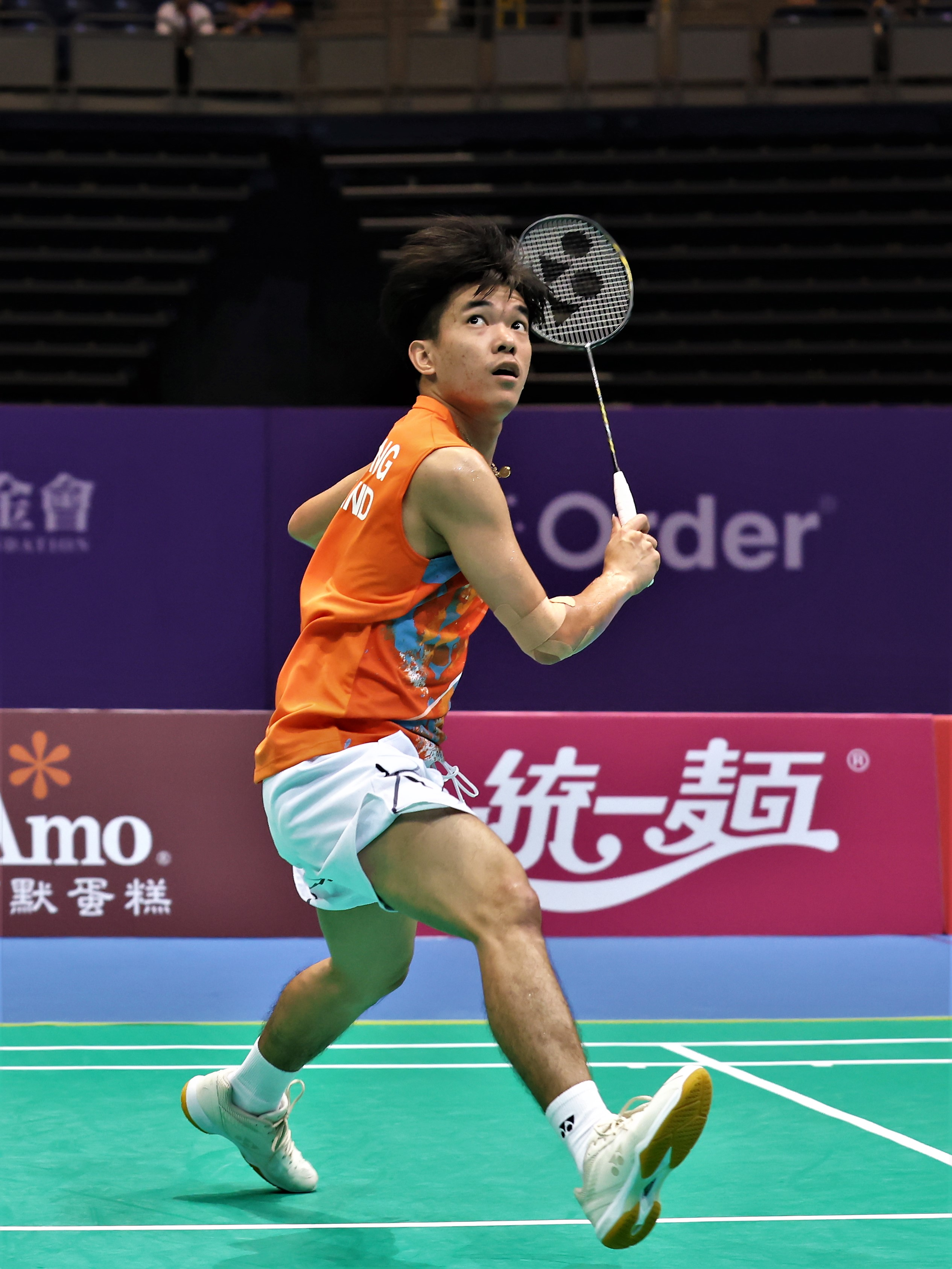
- Oupthong at the 2024 Kaohsiung Masters

Personal information
- Born: 12 April 2000 (age 26) Lampang, Thailand
- Height: 1.77 m (5 ft 10 in)

Sport
- Country: Thailand
- Sport: Badminton
- Handedness: Right

Mixed doubles
- Highest ranking: 12 (with Jhenicha Sudjaipraparat, 11 November 2025)
- Current ranking: 28 (with Jhenicha Sudjaipraparat, 10 November 2026)
- BWF profile
Medal record
Men's badminton
Representing Thailand
Asian Games
Bronze medal – third place	2026 Aichi–Nagoya	Men's team
SEA Games
Gold medal – first place	2025 Thailand	Mixed doubles
Bronze medal – third place	2023 Cambodia	Men's team
Bronze medal – third place	2025 Thailand	Men's team
World University Games
Bronze medal – third place	2021 Chengdu	Mixed team

Ruttanapak Oupthong (Thai: รุษฐนภัค อูปทอง; born 12 April 2000) is a Thai badminton player. He is a mixed doubles gold medalist at the 2025 SEA Games with Jhenicha Sudjaipraparat.

== Achievements ==
=== SEA Games ===
Mixed doubles
Year	Venue	Partner	Opponent	Score	Result	Ref.
2025	Gymnasium 4, Thammasat University Rangsit Campus; Pathum Thani, Thailand	(Thailand) Jhenicha Sudjaipraparat	(Thailand) Dechapol Puavaranukroh (Thailand) Supissara Paewsampran	22–20, 21–19	Gold	

=== BWF World Tour (3 titles, 4 runners-up) ===
The BWF World Tour, which was announced on 19 March 2017 and implemented in 2018, is a series of elite badminton tournaments sanctioned by the Badminton World Federation (BWF). The BWF World Tours are divided into levels of World Tour Finals, Super 1000, Super 750, Super 500, Super 300, and the BWF Tour Super 100.

Mixed doubles
Year	Tournament	Level	Partner	Opponent	Score	Result	Ref.
2022	Taipei Open	Super 300	(Thailand) Chasinee Korepap	(Hong Kong) Lee Chun Hei (Hong Kong) Ng Tsz Yau	8–21, 9–21	(silver) Runner-up	
2023	Vietnam Open	Super 100	(Thailand) Jhenicha Sudjaipraparat	(Japan) Hiroki Nishi (Japan) Akari Sato	21–15, 18–21, 14–21	(silver) Runner-up	
2023 (II)	Indonesia Masters	Super 100	(Thailand) Jhenicha Sudjaipraparat	(Indonesia) Jafar Hidayatullah (Indonesia) Aisyah Pranata	17–21, 19–21	(silver) Runner-up	
2024	Kaohsiung Masters	Super 100	(Thailand) Jhenicha Sudjaipraparat	(Chinese Taipei) Yang Po-hsuan (Chinese Taipei) Hu Ling-fang	21–18, 21–13	(gold) Winner	
2025	U.S. Open	Super 300	(Thailand) Jhenicha Sudjaipraparat	(Denmark) Rasmus Espersen (Denmark) Amalie Cecilie Kudsk	17–21, 21–13, 10–21	(silver) Runner-up	
2025	Canada Open	Super 300	(Thailand) Jhenicha Sudjaipraparat	(United States) Presley Smith (United States) Jennie Gai	21–14, 21–17	(gold) Winner	
2025	Baoji China Masters	Super 100	(Thailand) Benyapa Aimsaard	(China) Zhu Yijun (China) Li Qian	21–17, 21–16	(gold) Winner	

=== BWF International Challenge/Series (4 titles, 6 runners-up) ===
Men's doubles
Year	Tournament	Partner	Opponent	Score	Result
2019	Myanmar International	(Thailand) Nanthakarn Yordphaisong	(Indonesia) Emanuel Randhy Febryto (Indonesia) Ferdian Mahardika Ranialdy	16–21, 15–21	(silver) Runner-up
2022	Estonian International	(Thailand) Sirawit Sothon	(Singapore) Danny Bawa Chrisnanta (Singapore) Andy Kwek	21–17, 17–21, 21–16	(gold) Winner

Mixed doubles
Year	Tournament	Partner	Opponent	Score	Result
2022	Estonian International	(Thailand) Chasinee Korepap	(Thailand) Ratchapol Makkasasithorn (Thailand) Jhenicha Sudjaipraparat	15–21, 14–21	(silver) Runner-up
2022	Italian International	(Thailand) Chasinee Korepap	(Indonesia) Zachariah Josiahno Sumanti (Indonesia) Hediana Julimarbela	20–22, 9–21	(silver) Runner-up
2022 (I)	India International Challenge	(Thailand) Jhenicha Sudjaipraparat	(India) Gouse Shaik (India) K. Maneesha	21–18, 21–9	(gold) Winner
2022	Estonian International	(Thailand) Jhenicha Sudjaipraparat	(Thailand) Ratchapol Makkasasithorn (Thailand) Chasinee Korepap	16–21, 9–21	(silver) Runner-up
2022	Bahrain International Series	(Thailand) Jhenicha Sudjaipraparat	(England) Gregory Mairs (England) Jenny Moore	17–21, 16–21	(silver) Runner-up
2022	Bahrain International Challenge	(Thailand) Jhenicha Sudjaipraparat	(India) B. Sumeeth Reddy (India) K. Maneesha	22–20, 21–17	(gold) Winner
2023	Thailand International	(Thailand) Jhenicha Sudjaipraparat	(Indonesia) Adnan Maulana (Indonesia) Nita Violina Marwah	21–13, 21–19	(gold) Winner
2025	Thailand International	(Thailand) Sabrina Sophita Wedler	(Thailand) Phuwanat Horbanluekit (Thailand) Fungfa Korpthammakit	13–21, 12–21	(silver) Runner-up

BWF International Challenge tournament
BWF International Series tournament

=== BWF Junior International (3 titles, 1 runner-up) ===
Boys' singles
Year	Tournament	Opponent	Score	Result
2017	White Nights Junior International	(Russia) Mikhail Lavrikov	21–13, 21–18	(gold) Winner
2017	Bulgaria Junior International	(France) Arnaud Merklé	21–17, 21–14	(gold) Winner

Mixed doubles
Year	Tournament	Partner	Opponent	Score	Result
2017	White Nights Junior International	(Thailand) Chasinee Korepap	(Russia) Georgii Karpov (Russia) Anastasiia Kurdyukova	21–8, 21–6	(gold) Winner
2017	Bulgaria Junior International	(Thailand) Chasinee Korepap	(France) Thom Gicquel (France) Vimala Heriau	17–21, 18–21	(silver) Runner-up

BWF Junior International Challenge tournament
BWF Junior International Series tournament
