= Huang Yu-hsun =

Taiwanese badminton player

Huang Yu-hsun 黃宥薰
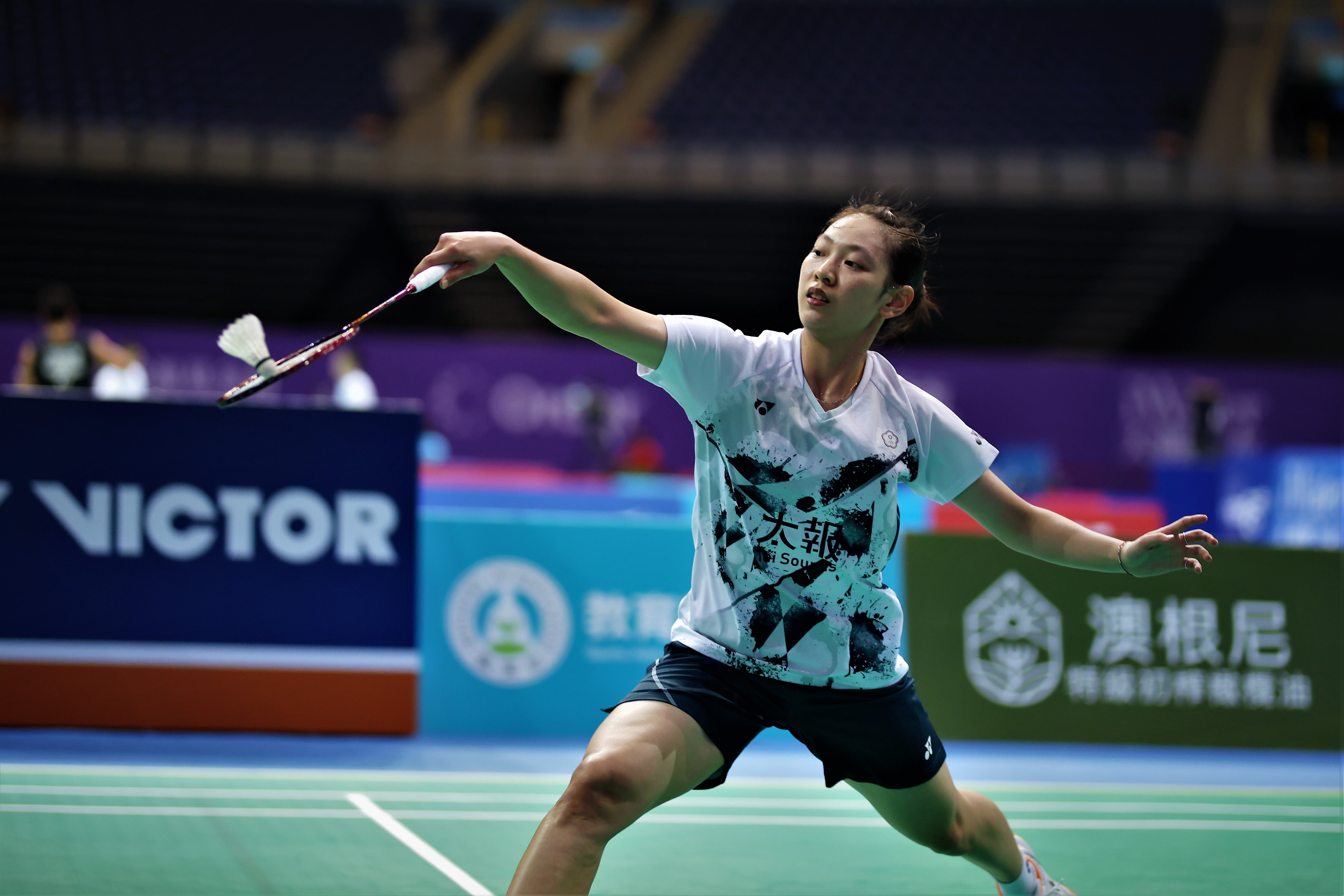
- Huang Yu-Hsun at the 2024 Kaohsiung Masters

Personal information
- Born: 24 October 2003 (age 23) Taiwan
- Height: 1.66 m (5 ft 5 in)

Sport
- Country: Republic of China (Taiwan)
- Sport: Badminton
- Handedness: Right

Women's singles & doubles
- Highest ranking: 22 (WS, 25 August 2026); 88 (WD with Liang Ting-yu, 5 November 2024); 232 (XD with Huang Jui-hsuan, 4 July 2023)
- Current ranking: 24 (WS, 27 October 2026)
- BWF profile

Huang Yu-hsun (born 24 October 2003) is a badminton player that born in Taiwan, representing Chinese Taipei.

== Achievement ==
=== BWF World Tour (1 title) ===
The BWF World Tour, which was announced on 19 March 2017 and implemented in 2018, is a series of elite badminton tournaments sanctioned by the Badminton World Federation (BWF). The BWF World Tour is divided into levels of World Tour Finals, Super 1000, Super 750, Super 500, Super 300, and the BWF Tour Super 100.

Women's singles

Year	Tournament	Level	Opponent	Score	Result	Ref
2025	Indonesia Masters Super 100	Super 100	(Japan) Sakura Masuki	16–21, 21–18, 21–13	(gold) Winner	

=== BWF International Challenge/Series (3 titles, 3 runners-up) ===
Women's singles
Year	Tournament	Opponent	Score	Result	Ref.
2022	Bulgarian International Championship	(Chinese Taipei) Lin Sih-yun	14–21, 15–21	(silver) Runner-up	
2022	Czech Open	(Denmark) Amalie Schulz	19–21, 14–21	(silver) Runner-up	
2023	Estonian International	(Estonia) Kristin Kuuba	13–21, 21–11, 21–11	(gold) Winner	
2023	Dutch International	(Bulgaria) Kaloyana Nalbantova	21–10, 21–11	(gold) Winner	
2023	Slovenia Open	(Turkey) Neslihan Arın	21–17, 21–17	(gold) Winner	
2023	Austrian Open	(Chinese Taipei) Wang Yu-si	13–21, 19–21	(silver) Runner-up	

BWF International Challenge tournament
BWF International Series tournament
BWF Future Series tournament
