= Chen Su-yu =

Taiwanese badminton player (born 1997)

Chen Su-yu 陳肅諭
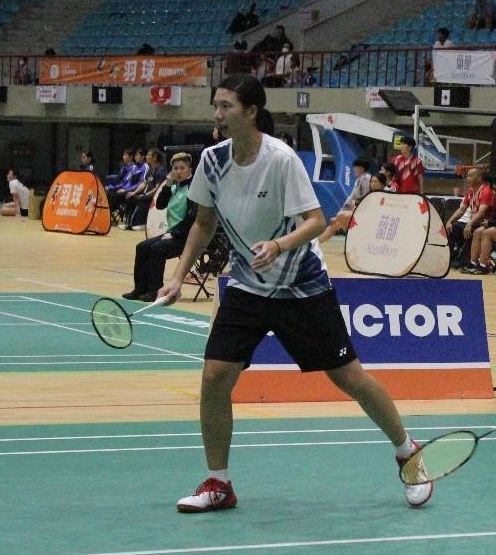
- Chen in 2023

Personal information
- Born: 19 December 1997 (age 28) Taichung, Taiwan

Sport
- Country: Republic of China (Taiwan)
- Sport: Badminton

Women's singles & doubles
- Highest ranking: 43 (WS, 30 November 2017); 48 (WD with Hsieh Yi-en, 21 October 2025)
- Current ranking: 65 (WS); 143 (WD with Hsieh Yi-en) (6 October 2026)
- BWF profile
Medal record
Women's badminton
Representing Chinese Taipei
Asia Junior Championships
Bronze medal – third place	2014 Taipei	Mixed team

Chen Su-yu (Chinese: 陳肅諭; pinyin: Chén Sùyù; born 19 December 1997) is a Taiwanese badminton player.

== Achievements ==
=== BWF International Challenge/Series (5 titles, 4 runners-up) ===
Women's singles
Year	Tournament	Opponent	Score	Result
2015	Vietnam International Series	(Malaysia) Goh Jin Wei	9–21, 13–21	(silver) Runner-up
2016	Vietnam International Series	(Malaysia) Lim Yin Fun	21–19, 23–21	(gold) Winner
2022	Sydney International	(Chinese Taipei) Sung Shuo-yun	21–17, 16–21, 14–21	(silver) Runner-up
2025	Sydney International	(Japan) Niina Matsuta	9–15, 15–9, 15–9	(gold) Winner
2026	North Harbour International	(Chinese Taipei) Tung Ciou-tong	19–21, 21–11, 8–21	(silver) Runner-up
2026	Sydney International	(Chinese Taipei) Tung Ciou-tong	17–21, 21–14, 23–21	(gold) Winner

Women's doubles
Year	Tournament	Partner	Opponent	Score	Result
2024	North Harbour International	(Chinese Taipei) Hsieh Yi-en	(Chinese Taipei) Lee Chih-chen (Chinese Taipei) Lin Yen-yu	12–21, 14–21	(silver) Runner-up
2025	North Harbour International	(Chinese Taipei) Hsieh Yi-en	(Chinese Taipei) Ko Ruo-hsuan (Chinese Taipei) Lee Yu-hsuan	21–15, 21–16	(gold) Winner
2025	Sydney International	(Chinese Taipei) Hsieh Yi-en	(Australia) Gronya Somerville (Australia) Angela Yu	8–15, 15–13, 15–9	(gold) Winner

BWF International Challenge tournament
BWF International Series tournament
BWF Future Series tournament
