= 2025 Japan Masters =

Badminton tournament in Japan

Tournament details
- Dates: 11–16 November
- Edition: 3rd
- Level: Super 500
- Total prize money: US$475,000
- Venue: Kumamoto Prefectural Gymnasium
- Location: Kumamoto, Japan

Champions
- Men's singles: (Japan) Kodai Naraoka
- Women's singles: (Thailand) Ratchanok Intanon
- Men's doubles: (South Korea) Kim Won-ho (South Korea) Seo Seung-jae
- Women's doubles: (Malaysia) Pearly Tan (Malaysia) Thinaah Muralitharan
- Mixed doubles: (Thailand) Dechapol Puavaranukroh (Thailand) Supissara Paewsampran

The 2025 Japan Masters (officially known as the Kumamoto Masters Japan 2025) was a badminton tournament which took place at Kumamoto Prefectural Gymnasium in Kumamoto, Japan, from 11 to 16 November 2025 and had a total prize of $475,000. Kodai Naraoka won the men's singles title, while Ratchanok Intanon won the women's singles title. Kim Won-ho and Seo Seung-jae won the men's doubles, Pearly Tan and Thinaah Muralitharan won the women's doubles, and Dechapol Puavaranukroh and Supissara Paewsampran won the mixed doubles.

== Tournament ==
The 2025 Japan Masters was the thirty-fifth tournament of the 2025 BWF World Tour and also part of the Japan Masters championships, which have been held since 2023. This tournament was organized by the Badminton Association of Japan (formerly known as the Nippon Badminton Association) with sanction from the BWF.

=== Venue ===
This tournament was held at Kumamoto Prefectural Gymnasium in Kumamoto, Japan.

=== Point distribution ===
Below is the point distribution table for each phase of the tournament based on the BWF points system for the BWF World Tour Super 500 event.

| Winner | Runner-up | 3/4 | 5/8 | 9/16 | 17/32 | 33/64 | 65/128 |
|---|---|---|---|---|---|---|---|
| 9,200 | 7,800 | 6,420 | 5,040 | 3,600 | 2,220 | 880 | 430 |

=== Prize pool ===
The total prize money was US$475,000 with the distribution of the prize money in accordance with BWF regulations.

| Event | Winner | Finalist | Semi-finals | Quarter-finals | Last 16 |
| Singles | $35,625 | $18,050 | $6,887.50 | $2,850 | $1,662.50 |
| Doubles | $37,525 | $18,050 | $6,650 | $3,443.75 | $1,718.25 |

== Men's singles ==
=== Seeds ===
1. (Thailand) Kunlavut Vitidsarn (withdrew)
2. (Chinese Taipei) Chou Tien-chen (second round)
3. (Singapore) Loh Kean Yew (quarter-finals)
4. (Japan) Kodai Naraoka (champion)
5. (Chinese Taipei) Lin Chun-yi (quarter-finals)
6. (Japan) Kenta Nishimoto (final)
7. (India) Lakshya Sen (semi-finals)
8. (Indonesia) Alwi Farhan (second round)

=== Finals ===
Semi-finals
4 | (Japan) Kodai Naraoka | 21 | 21
(Chinese Taipei) Wang Tzu-wei | 11 | 12
7 | (India) Lakshya Sen | 19 | 21 | 12
6 | (Japan) Kenta Nishimoto | 21 | 14 | 21

Final
4 | (Japan) Kodai Naraoka | 21 | 10 | 21
6 | (Japan) Kenta Nishimoto | 11 | 21 | 15

=== Top half ===
==== Section 1 ====
First round
4 | (Japan) K Naraoka | 21 | 21
(India) A Shetty | 16 | 11
(Chinese Taipei) Chi Y-j | 20 | 21 | 14
(Japan) Y Tanaka | 22 | 9 | 21
5 | (Chinese Taipei) Lin C-y | 21 | 21
(Canada) B Yang | 19 | 16
(India) T Mannepalli | 9 | 19
(South Korea) Jeon H-j | 21 | 21

Second round
4 | (Japan) K Naraoka | 21 | 21
(Japan) Y Tanaka | 15 | 12
5 | (Chinese Taipei) Lin C-y | 21 | 21
(South Korea) Jeon H-j | 14 | 7

Quarter-finals
4 | (Japan) K Naraoka | 21 | 21
5 | (Chinese Taipei) Lin C-y | 11 | 12

==== Section 2 ====
First round
8 | (Indonesia) A Farhan | 21 | 21
PFQ | (Japan) T Obayashi | 15 | 10
(Chinese Taipei) Wang T-w | 18 | 21 | 24
Q2 | (Japan) R Takei | 21 | 17 | 22
SWM | (Chinese Taipei) Lee C-h | 18 | 17
(Denmark) R Gemke | 21 | 21
(India) Prannoy H. S. | 16 | 21 | 23
(Malaysia) Leong J H | 21 | 13 | 21

Second round
8 | (Indonesia) A Farhan | 19 | 12
(Chinese Taipei) Wang T-w | 21 | 21
(Denmark) R Gemke | 21 | 21
(India) Prannoy H. S. | 18 | 15

Quarter-finals
(Chinese Taipei) Wang T-w | 21 | 21
(Denmark) R Gemke | 14 | 13

=== Bottom half ===
==== Section 3 ====
First round
(Singapore) J Teh | 21 | 15 | 21
(Canada) V Lai | 18 | 21 | 17
(Japan) K Watanabe | 12 | 16
7 | (India) L Sen | 21 | 21
Q1 | (Japan) S Ogawa | 21 | 21
(Malaysia) J Hoh | 14 | 9
(Chinese Taipei) Huang P-h | 12 | 17
3 | (Singapore) Loh K Y | 21 | 21

Second round
(Singapore) J Teh | 13 | 11
7 | (India) L Sen | 21 | 21
Q1 | (Japan) S Ogawa | 14 | 14
3 | (Singapore) Loh K Y | 21 | 21

Quarter-finals
7 | (India) L Sen | 21 | 21
3 | (Singapore) Loh K Y | 13 | 17

==== Section 4 ====
First round
(India) K George | 20 | 10
Q3 | (Malaysia) Kok J H | 22 | 21
(Thailand) K Wangcharoen | 13 | 13
6 | (Japan) K Nishimoto | 21 | 21
(Thailand) P Teeraratsakul | 17 | 21 | 21
Q4 | (Indonesia) Z Ubaidillah | 21 | 19 | 10
(Chinese Taipei) Su L-y | 21 | 18 | 17
2 | (Chinese Taipei) Chou T-c | 11 | 21 | 21

Second round
Q3 | (Malaysia) Kok J H | 20 | 11
6 | (Japan) K Nishimoto | 22 | 21
(Thailand) P Teeraratsakul | 21 | 21
2 | (Chinese Taipei) Chou T-c | 19 | 16

Quarter-finals
6 | (Japan) K Nishimoto | 21 | 21
(Thailand) P Teeraratsakul | 15 | 14

== Women's singles ==
=== Seeds ===
1. (Japan) Akane Yamaguchi (second round)
2. (Japan) Tomoka Miyazaki (first round)
3. (Thailand) Ratchanok Intanon (champion)
4. (Indonesia) Gregoria Mariska Tunjung (final)
5. (Canada) Michelle Li (second round)
6. (Thailand) Busanan Ongbamrungphan (first round)
7. (Chinese Taipei) Chiu Pin-chian (semi-finals)
8. (Chinese Taipei) Lin Hsiang-ti (quarter-finals)

=== Finals ===
Semi-finals
(Japan) Nozomi Okuhara | 18 | 21 | 14
3 | (Thailand) Ratchanok Intanon | 21 | 10 | 21
4 | (Indonesia) Gregoria Mariska Tunjung | 21 | 21
7 | (Chinese Taipei) Chiu Pin-chian | 16 | 14

Final
3 | (Thailand) Ratchanok Intanon | 21 | 22
4 | (Indonesia) Gregoria Mariska Tunjung | 16 | 20

=== Top half ===
==== Section 1 ====
First round
1 | (Japan) A Yamaguchi | 22 | 23
(Chinese Taipei) Chen S-y | 20 | 21
(Thailand) P Opatniputh | 19 | 21 | 12
(Japan) N Okuhara | 21 | 15 | 21
8 | (Chinese Taipei) Lin H-t | 21 | 21
Q1 | (Japan) N Hisaminato | 14 | 6
(Chinese Taipei) Tung C-t | 13 | 21 | 21
(Japan) M Suizu | 21 | 9 | 17

Second round
1 | (Japan) A Yamaguchi | 19 | 15
(Japan) N Okuhara | 21 | 21
8 | (Chinese Taipei) Lin H-t | 21 | 21
(Chinese Taipei) Tung C-t | 18 | 15

Quarter-finals
(Japan) N Okuhara | 21 | 21
8 | (Chinese Taipei) Lin H-t | 9 | 19

==== Section 2 ====
First round
3 | (Thailand) R Intanon | 21 | 21
(Chinese Taipei) Hsieh Y-e | 9 | 8
Q4 | (Japan) K Furukawa | 19 | 16
(United States) BW Zhang | 21 | 21
5 | (Canada) M Li | 21 | 21
(Czech Republic) T Švábíková | 18 | 12
(Malaysia) Wong L C | 21 | 21
Q3 | (Japan) N Kondo | 16 | 11

Second round
3 | (Thailand) R Intanon | 22 | 21 | 21
(United States) BW Zhang | 24 | 13 | 10
5 | (Canada) M Li | 17 | 21 | 19
(Malaysia) Wong L C | 21 | 16 | 21

Quarter-finals
3 | (Thailand) R Intanon | 21 | 21
(Malaysia) Wong L C | 17 | 9

=== Bottom half ===
==== Section 3 ====
First round
(Chinese Taipei) Pai Y-p | 21 | 12 | 13
(Japan) A Takahashi | 18 | 21 | 21
(Indonesia) N Pratiwi | 21 | 13 | 23
6 | (Thailand) B Ongbamrungphan | 15 | 21 | 21
(Japan) N Nidaira | 8 | 18
(Japan) H Akechi | 21 | 21
(Chinese Taipei) Hung Y-t | 21 | 9 | 18
4 | (Indonesia) G M Tunjung | 17 | 21 | 21

Second round
(Japan) A Takahashi | 10 | 21 | 21
(Indonesia) N Pratiwi | 21 | 16 | 12
(Japan) H Akechi | 21 | 18
4 | (Indonesia) G M Tunjung | 23 | 21

Quarter-finals
(Japan) A Takahashi | 21 | 14 | 13
4 | (Indonesia) G M Tunjung | 16 | 21 | 21

==== Section 4 ====
First round
(Azerbaijan) K F Azzahra | 23 | 8
(Malaysia) Letshanaa K | 25 | 21
Q2 | (New Zealand) S Li | 21 | 5 | 16
7 | (Chinese Taipei) Chiu P-c | 16 | 21 | 21
(Chinese Taipei) Huang Y-h | 21 | 21
(Japan) K Sugiyama | 11 | 12
(Chinese Taipei) Sung S-y | 21 | 21
2 | (Japan) T Miyazaki | 19 | 13

Second round
(Malaysia) Letshanaa K | 22 | 18
7 | (Chinese Taipei) Chiu P-c | 24 | 21
(Chinese Taipei) Huang Y-h | 21 | 21
(Chinese Taipei) Sung S-y | 15 | 16

Quarter-finals
7 | (Chinese Taipei) Chiu P-c | 18 | 21 | 21
(Chinese Taipei) Huang Y-h | 21 | 15 | 17

== Men's doubles ==
=== Seeds ===
1. (South Korea) Kim Won-ho / Seo Seung-jae (champions)
2. (Malaysia) Goh Sze Fei / Nur Izzuddin (semi-finals)
3. (Malaysia) Man Wei Chong / Tee Kai Wun (first round)
4. (Japan) Takuro Hoki / Yugo Kobayashi (withdrew)
5. (Chinese Taipei) Lee Jhe-huei / Yang Po-hsuan (quarter-finals)
6. (Chinese Taipei) Chiu Hsiang-chieh / Wang Chi-lin (semi-finals)
7. (Malaysia) Junaidi Arif / Yap Roy King (quarter-finals)
8. (Chinese Taipei) Lee Fang-chih / Lee Fang-jen (first round)

=== Finals ===
Semi-finals
1 | (South Korea) Kim Won-ho (South Korea) Seo Seung-jae | 21 | 21
6 | (Chinese Taipei) Chiu Hsiang-chieh (Chinese Taipei) Wang Chi-lin | 19 | 19
(Japan) Hiroki Midorikawa (Japan) Kyohei Yamashita | 21 | 21
2 | (Malaysia) Goh Sze Fei (Malaysia) Nur Izzuddin | 12 | 17

Final
1 | (South Korea) Kim Won-ho (South Korea) Seo Seung-jae | 20 | 21 | 21
(Japan) Hiroki Midorikawa (Japan) Kyohei Yamashita | 22 | 11 | 16

=== Top half ===
==== Section 1 ====
First round
1 | (South Korea) Kim W-h (South Korea) Seo S-j | 21 | 21
Q4 | (Japan) M Onodera (Japan) D Tanioka | 12 | 15
(South Korea) Jin Y (South Korea) Na S-s | 21 | 10 | 21
(Denmark) C Kjær (Denmark) R Kjær | 19 | 21 | 19
8 | (Chinese Taipei) Lee F-c (Chinese Taipei) Lee F-j | 9 | 16
(Japan) K Kumagai (Japan) H Nishi | 21 | 21
(Chinese Taipei) Lai P-y (Chinese Taipei) Tsai F-c | 16 | 14
(Malaysia) N M Azriyn A (Malaysia) Tan W K | 21 | 21

Second round
1 | (South Korea) Kim W-h (South Korea) Seo S-j | 21 | 21
(South Korea) Jin Y (South Korea) Na S-s | 11 | 18
(Japan) K Kumagai (Japan) H Nishi | 21 | 21
(Malaysia) N M Azriyn A (Malaysia) Tan W K | 13 | 11

Quarter-finals
1 | (South Korea) Kim W-h (South Korea) Seo S-j | 21 | 21
(Japan) K Kumagai (Japan) H Nishi | 11 | 17

==== Section 2 ====
First round
6 | (Chinese Taipei) Chiu H-c (Chinese Taipei) Wang C-l | 25 | 21
(Chinese Taipei) Chen C-k (Chinese Taipei) Lin B-w | 23 | 16
(United States) Chen Z-y (United States) P Smith | 22 | 21
PFQ | (Malaysia) Chia W J (Malaysia) Lwi S H | 20 | 12
SWM | (Chinese Taipei) Liu K-h (Chinese Taipei) Yang P-ha | 23 | 23
(Chinese Taipei) He Z-w (Chinese Taipei) Huang J-h | 21 | 21
(Malaysia) Choong H J (Malaysia) M Haikal | 21 | 21
(Japan) K Shibata (Japan) N Yamada | 19 | 16

Second round
6 | (Chinese Taipei) Chiu H-c (Chinese Taipei) Wang C-l | 14 | 21 | 21
(United States) Chen Z-y (United States) P Smith | 21 | 13 | 19
SWM | (Chinese Taipei) Liu K-h (Chinese Taipei) Yang P-ha | 21 | 17 | 19
(Malaysia) Choong H J (Malaysia) M Haikal | 14 | 21 | 21

Quarter-finals
6 | (Chinese Taipei) Chiu H-c (Chinese Taipei) Wang C-l | 21 | 21
(Malaysia) Choong H J (Malaysia) M Haikal | 16 | 16

=== Bottom half ===
==== Section 3 ====
First round
(Japan) T Nomura (Japan) Y Shimogami | 23 | 21
Q2 | (Thailand) D Puavaranukroh (Thailand) L E Wedler | 21 | 14
(Chinese Taipei) Chang K-c (Chinese Taipei) Po L-w | 19 | 12
7 | (Malaysia) J Arif (Malaysia) Yap R K | 21 | 21
(Malaysia) Ong Y S (Malaysia) Teo E Y | 21 | 21
(Chinese Taipei) Chen Z-r (Chinese Taipei) Lin Y-c | 18 | 18
(Japan) H Midorikawa (Japan) K Yamashita | 21 | 21
3 | (Malaysia) Man W C (Malaysia) Tee K W | 19 | 18

Second round
(Japan) T Nomura (Japan) Y Shimogami | 11 | 19
7 | (Malaysia) J Arif (Malaysia) Yap R K | 21 | 21
(Malaysia) Ong Y S (Malaysia) Teo E Y | 17 | 21 | 14
(Japan) H Midorikawa (Japan) K Yamashita | 21 | 10 | 21

Quarter-finals
7 | (Malaysia) J Arif (Malaysia) Yap R K | 19 | 14
(Japan) H Midorikawa (Japan) K Yamashita | 21 | 21

==== Section 4 ====
First round
Q3 | (Japan) H Kawabe (Japan) K Matsukawa | 21 | 21
(South Korea) Choi S-g (Malaysia) Goh V S | 18 | 19
(Japan) K Mitsuhashi (Japan) H Okamura | 18 | 19
5 | (Chinese Taipei) Lee J-h (Chinese Taipei) Yang P-hs | 21 | 21
Q1 | (Japan) T Aizawa (Japan) D Sano | 21 | 18 | 8
(Japan) K Matsui (Japan) K Tamate | 18 | 21 | 21
(South Korea) Kang M-h (South Korea) Ki D-j | 17 | 13
2 | (Malaysia) Goh S F (Malaysia) N Izzuddin | 21 | 21

Second round
Q3 | (Japan) H Kawabe (Japan) K Matsukawa | 18 | 21 | 14
5 | (Chinese Taipei) Lee J-h (Chinese Taipei) Yang P-hs | 21 | 16 | 21
(Japan) K Matsui (Japan) K Tamate | 23 | 13 | 24
2 | (Malaysia) Goh S F (Malaysia) N Izzuddin | 21 | 21 | 26

Quarter-finals
5 | (Chinese Taipei) Lee J-h (Chinese Taipei) Yang P-hs | 16 | 21 | 16
2 | (Malaysia) Goh S F (Malaysia) N Izzuddin | 21 | 10 | 21

== Women's doubles ==
=== Seeds ===
1. (Malaysia) Pearly Tan / Thinaah Muralitharan (champions)
2. (South Korea) Kim Hye-jeong / Kong Hee-yong (semi-finals)
3. (Japan) Yuki Fukushima / Mayu Matsumoto (semi-finals)
4. (Japan) Rin Iwanaga / Kie Nakanishi (final)
5. (Chinese Taipei) Hsieh Pei-shan / Hung En-tzu (first round)
6. (Japan) Arisa Igarashi / Chiharu Shida (second round)
7. (Chinese Taipei) Hsu Yin-hui / Lin Jhih-yun (quarter-finals)
8. (Chinese Taipei) Chang Ching-hui / Yang Ching-tun (second round)

=== Finals ===
Semi-finals
1 | (Malaysia) Pearly Tan (Malaysia) Thinaah Muralitharan | 24 | 23
3 | (Japan) Yuki Fukushima (Japan) Mayu Matsumoto | 22 | 21
4 | (Japan) Rin Iwanaga (Japan) Kie Nakanishi | 21 | 21
2 | (South Korea) Kim Hye-jeong (South Korea) Kong Hee-yong | 16 | 11

Final
1 | (Malaysia) Pearly Tan (Malaysia) Thinaah Muralitharan | 22 | 21
4 | (Japan) Rin Iwanaga (Japan) Kie Nakanishi | 20 | 19

=== Top half ===
==== Section 1 ====
First round
1 | (Malaysia) P Tan (Malaysia) Thinaah M | 18 | 21 | 21
Q3 | (Japan) M Aiso (Japan) M Niimi | 21 | 9 | 17
Q1 | (Japan) M Aoki (Japan) A Uesugi | 8 | 12
(South Korea) Jeong N-e (South Korea) Lee Y-w | 21 | 21
7 | (Chinese Taipei) Hsu Y-h (Chinese Taipei) Lin J-y | 21 | 21
(Thailand) O Jongsathapornparn (Thailand) S Suwachai | 15 | 13
(Japan) N Hara (Japan) R Kiyose | 21 | 20 | 21
(Canada) J Dent (Canada) C Lai | 9 | 22 | 18

Second round
1 | (Malaysia) P Tan (Malaysia) Thinaah M | 21 | 21
(South Korea) Jeong N-e (South Korea) Lee Y-w | 14 | 9
7 | (Chinese Taipei) Hsu Y-h (Chinese Taipei) Lin J-y | 21 | 21
(Japan) N Hara (Japan) R Kiyose | 16 | 14

Quarter-finals
1 | (Malaysia) P Tan (Malaysia) Thinaah M | 21 | 21
7 | (Chinese Taipei) Hsu Y-h (Chinese Taipei) Lin J-y | 13 | 17

==== Section 2 ====
First round
3 | (Japan) Y Fukushima (Japan) M Matsumoto | 21 | 21
(Chinese Taipei) Chen S-y (Chinese Taipei) Hsieh Y-e | 10 | 10
(Indonesia) A Rahayu (Indonesia) S F S Ramadhanti | 21 | 21
(Japan) S Hirota (Japan) H Konishi | 12 | 18
8 | (Chinese Taipei) Chang C-h (Chinese Taipei) Yang C-t | 21 | 15 | 21
Q2 | (Chinese Taipei) Lee C-c (Chinese Taipei) Lin Y-y | 15 | 21 | 7
PFQ | (Thailand) B Aimsaard (Thailand) S Wedler | 20 | 16
(Chinese Taipei) Hu L-f (Chinese Taipei) Jheng Y-c | 22 | 21

Second round
3 | (Japan) Y Fukushima (Japan) M Matsumoto | 21 | 21
(Indonesia) A Rahayu (Indonesia) S F S Ramadhanti | 10 | 16
8 | (Chinese Taipei) Chang C-h (Chinese Taipei) Yang C-t | 17 | 13
(Chinese Taipei) Hu L-f (Chinese Taipei) Jheng Y-c | 21 | 21

Quarter-finals
3 | (Japan) Y Fukushima (Japan) M Matsumoto | 21 | 21
(Chinese Taipei) Hu L-f (Chinese Taipei) Jheng Y-c | 17 | 11

=== Bottom half ===
==== Section 3 ====
First round
(United States) F Corbett (United States) J Gai | 22 | 15 | 14
(Japan) R Hirokami (Japan) S Hobara | 20 | 21 | 21
(Malaysia) Ong X Y (Malaysia) C Ting | 22 | 18 | 21
5 | (Chinese Taipei) Hsieh P-s (Chinese Taipei) Hung E-t | 20 | 21 | 10
(Chinese Taipei) Hsu Y-c (Chinese Taipei) Sung Y-h | 13 | 21 | 21
(Japan) H Suzuki (Japan) N Yamakita | 21 | 9 | 23
(Chinese Taipei) Lin X-m (Chinese Taipei) Wang Y-q | 8 | 21 | 13
4 | (Japan) R Iwanaga (Japan) K Nakanishi | 21 | 17 | 21

Second round
(Japan) R Hirokami (Japan) S Hobara | 21 | 21
(Malaysia) Ong X Y (Malaysia) C Ting | 12 | 9
(Japan) H Suzuki (Japan) N Yamakita | 21 | 20 | 18
4 | (Japan) R Iwanaga (Japan) K Nakanishi | 17 | 22 | 21

Quarter-finals
(Japan) R Hirokami (Japan) S Hobara | 23 | 20 | 18
4 | (Japan) R Iwanaga (Japan) K Nakanishi | 21 | 22 | 21

==== Section 4 ====
First round
PFQ | (Chinese Taipei) Teng C-h (Chinese Taipei) Yang C-y | 21 | 17 | 21
(France) M Lambert (France) C Pognante | 18 | 21 | 19
(Chinese Taipei) Chen Y-f (Chinese Taipei) Sun L-c | 13 | 14
6 | (Japan) A Igarashi (Japan) C Shida | 21 | 21
(Chinese Taipei) Sung S-y (Chinese Taipei) Yu C-h | 12 | 21 | 21
(Japan) K Osawa (Japan) M Tanabe | 21 | 19 | 17
Q4 | (Japan) R Hiramoto (Japan) K Ishikawa | 13 | 13
2 | (South Korea) Kim H-j (South Korea) Kong H-y | 21 | 21

Second round
PFQ | (Chinese Taipei) Teng C-h (Chinese Taipei) Yang C-y | w | / | o
6 | (Japan) A Igarashi (Japan) C Shida
(Chinese Taipei) Sung S-y (Chinese Taipei) Yu C-h | 15 | 19
2 | (South Korea) Kim H-j (South Korea) Kong H-y | 21 | 21

Quarter-finals
PFQ | (Chinese Taipei) Teng C-h (Chinese Taipei) Yang C-y | 10 | 14
2 | (South Korea) Kim H-j (South Korea) Kong H-y | 21 | 21

== Mixed doubles ==
=== Seeds ===
1. (Thailand) Dechapol Puavaranukroh / Supissara Paewsampran (champions)
2. (France) Thom Gicquel / Delphine Delrue (final)
3. (Japan) Hiroki Midorikawa / Natsu Saito (second round)
4. (Malaysia) Goh Soon Huat / Shevon Jemie Lai (first round)
5. (Thailand) Ruttanapak Oupthong / Jhenicha Sudjaipraparat (second round)
6. (Chinese Taipei) Yang Po-hsuan / Hu Ling-fang (first round)
7. (Chinese Taipei) Ye Hong-wei / Nicole Gonzales Chan (semi-finals)
8. (Denmark) Mathias Christiansen / Alexandra Bøje (quarter-finals)

=== Finals ===
Semi-finals
1 | (Thailand) Dechapol Puavaranukroh (Thailand) Supissara Paewsampran | 21 | 21
(Japan) Akira Koga (Japan) Misaki Matsutomo | 19 | 12
7 | (Chinese Taipei) Ye Hong-wei (Chinese Taipei) Nicole Gonzales Chan | 17 | 12
2 | (France) Thom Gicquel (France) Delphine Delrue | 21 | 21

Final
1 | (Thailand) Dechapol Puavaranukroh (Thailand) Supissara Paewsampran | 21 | 14 | 21
2 | (France) Thom Gicquel (France) Delphine Delrue | 18 | 21 | 18

=== Top half ===
==== Section 1 ====
First round
1 | (Thailand) D Puavaranukroh (Thailand) S Paewsampran | 21 | 21
Q2 | (Japan) H Kawabe (Japan) K Ishikawa | 17 | 10
(Malaysia) Hoo P R (Malaysia) Cheng S Y | 21 | 18 | 21
(Chinese Taipei) Wu H-y (Chinese Taipei) Yang C-y | 18 | 21 | 19
6 | (Chinese Taipei) Yang P-hs (Chinese Taipei) Hu L-f | 20 | 20
(Thailand) P Horbanluekit (Thailand) B Aimsaard | 22 | 22
(Chinese Taipei) Po L-w (Chinese Taipei) Chang C-h | 21 | 21
(United States) Chen Z-y (United States) F Corbett | 13 | 13

Second round
1 | (Thailand) D Puavaranukroh (Thailand) S Paewsampran | 14 | 21 | 21
(Malaysia) Hoo P R (Malaysia) Cheng S Y | 21 | 12 | 17
(Thailand) P Horbanluekit (Thailand) B Aimsaard | 21 | 22
(Chinese Taipei) Po L-w (Chinese Taipei) Chang C-h | 17 | 20

Quarter-finals
1 | (Thailand) D Puavaranukroh (Thailand) S Paewsampran | 21 | 21
(Thailand) P Horbanluekit (Thailand) B Aimsaard | 12 | 17

==== Section 2 ====
First round
3 | (Japan) H Midorikawa (Japan) N Saito | 21 | 21
(Thailand) S Jomkoh (Thailand) O Jongsathapornparn | 14 | 15
(United States) P Smith (United States) J Gai | 21 | 19 | 22
(India) R Kapoor (India) R Gadde | 12 | 21 | 20
5 | (Thailand) R Oupthong (Thailand) J Sudjaipraparat | 22 | 21
(Chinese Taipei) Lin Y-c (Chinese Taipei) Lee C-c | 20 | 19
(Japan) A Koga (Japan) M Matsutomo | 21 | 21
(Canada) J Lai (Canada) C Lai | 8 | 10

Second round
3 | (Japan) H Midorikawa (Japan) N Saito | 21 | 17 | 19
(United States) P Smith (United States) J Gai | 14 | 21 | 21
5 | (Thailand) R Oupthong (Thailand) J Sudjaipraparat | 16 | 21 | 19
(Japan) A Koga (Japan) M Matsutomo | 21 | 10 | 21

Quarter-finals
(United States) P Smith (United States) J Gai | 16 | 14
(Japan) A Koga (Japan) M Matsutomo | 21 | 21

=== Bottom half ===
==== Section 3 ====
First round
(Malaysia) J Wong (Malaysia) Lai P J | 21 | 21
(Chinese Taipei) Lu M-c (Chinese Taipei) Hung E-t | 19 | 15
(New Zealand) E Lau (New Zealand) S Li | 13 | 12
7 | (Chinese Taipei) Ye H-w (Chinese Taipei) N G Chan | 21 | 21
(Chinese Taipei) Liu K-h (Chinese Taipei) Jheng Y-c | 21 | 21
(Malaysia) Wong T C (Malaysia) Lim C S | 15 | 16
(Japan) Y Shimogami (Japan) S Hobara | 21 | 21
4 | (Malaysia) Goh S H (Malaysia) S J Lai | 17 | 13

Second round
(Malaysia) J Wong (Malaysia) Lai P J | 17 | 14
7 | (Chinese Taipei) Ye H-w (Chinese Taipei) N G Chan | 21 | 21
(Chinese Taipei) Liu K-h (Chinese Taipei) Jheng Y-c | 21 | 9 | 21
(Japan) Y Shimogami (Japan) S Hobara | 18 | 21 | 13

Quarter-finals
7 | (Chinese Taipei) Ye H-w (Chinese Taipei) N G Chan | 21 | 21
(Chinese Taipei) Liu K-h (Chinese Taipei) Jheng Y-c | 18 | 16

==== Section 4 ====
First round
Q4 | (Chinese Taipei) He Z-w (Chinese Taipei) Sun L-c | 14 | 21 | 12
Q1 | (Japan) K Shibata (Japan) H Osawa | 21 | 19 | 21
PFQ | (Japan) T Aizawa (Japan) M Kurashima | 13 | 12
8 | (Denmark) M Christiansen (Denmark) A Bøje | 21 | 21
Q3 | (Japan) K Matsukawa (Japan) R Kiyose | 23 | 11
(Chinese Taipei) Chen C-k (Chinese Taipei) Hsu Y-h | 25 | 21
(South Korea) Kim J-h (South Korea) Jeong N-e | 13 | 10
2 | (France) T Gicquel (France) D Delrue | 21 | 21

Second round
Q1 | (Japan) K Shibata (Japan) H Osawa | 8 | 16
8 | (Denmark) M Christiansen (Denmark) A Bøje | 21 | 21
(Chinese Taipei) Chen C-k (Chinese Taipei) Hsu Y-h | 17 | 13
2 | (France) T Gicquel (France) D Delrue | 21 | 21

Quarter-finals
8 | (Denmark) M Christiansen (Denmark) A Bøje | 15 | 21 | 15
2 | (France) T Gicquel (France) D Delrue | 21 | 13 | 21

| Preceded by 2025 Korea Masters | BWF World Tour; 2025 BWF season | Succeeded by 2025 Australian Open |
