= 2025 Singapore Open (badminton) =

2025 badminton tournament in Singapore

Tournament details
- Dates: 27 May–1 June
- Edition: 74th
- Level: Super 750
- Total prize money: US$1,000,000
- Venue: Singapore Indoor Stadium
- Location: Kallang, Singapore

Champions
- Men's singles: (Thailand) Kunlavut Vitidsarn
- Women's singles: (China) Chen Yufei
- Men's doubles: (Malaysia) Aaron Chia (Malaysia) Soh Wooi Yik
- Women's doubles: (South Korea) Kim Hye-jeong (South Korea) Kong Hee-yong
- Mixed doubles: (Thailand) Dechapol Puavaranukroh (Thailand) Supissara Paewsampran

The 2025 Singapore Open (officially known as the KFF Singapore Badminton Open 2025 for sponsorship reasons) was a badminton tournament which took place at Singapore Indoor Stadium in Singapore from 27 May to 1 June 2025 and had a total purse of $1,000,000.

== Tournament ==
The 2025 Singapore Open was the thirteenth tournament of the 2025 BWF World Tour and also part of the Singapore Open championships, which had been held since 1929. This tournament was organized by the Singapore Badminton Association with sanction from the BWF.

=== Venue ===
This international tournament was held at Singapore Indoor Stadium in Singapore.

=== Point distribution ===
Below was the point distribution table for each phase of the tournament based on the BWF points system for the BWF World Tour Super 750 event.

Winner	Runner-up	3/4	5/8	9/16	17/32
11,000	9,350	7,700	6,050	4,320	2,660

=== Prize pool ===
The total prize money is US$1,000,000 with the distribution of the prize money in accordance with BWF regulations.

Event	Winner	Finalist	Semi-finals	Quarter-finals	Last 16	Last 32
Singles	$70,000	$34,000	$14,000	$5,500	$3,000	$1,000
Doubles	$74,000	$35,000	$14,000	$6,250	$3,250	$1,000

== Men's singles ==
=== Seeds ===
1. (China) Shi Yuqi (second round)
2. (Thailand) Kunlavut Vitidsarn (champion)
3. (Denmark) Anders Antonsen (first round)
4. (China) Li Shifeng (second round)
5. (Indonesia) Jonatan Christie (second round)
6. (Chinese Taipei) Chou Tien-chen (second round)
7. (Japan) Kodai Naraoka (quarter-finals)
8. (France) Alex Lanier (first round)

=== Finals ===
Semi-finals
(China) Lu Guangzu	21	8	21
(France) Christo Popov	15	21	15
(Chinese Taipei) Lin Chun-yi	11	23
2	(Thailand) Kunlavut Vitidsarn	21	25

Final
(China) Lu Guangzu	6	10
2	(Thailand) Kunlavut Vitidsarn	21	21

=== Top half ===
==== Section 1 ====
First round
1	(China) Shi YQ	21	21
(Singapore) J Teh	16	16
(China) Lu GZ	19	21	21
(Chinese Taipei) Lee C-h	21	15	16
7	(Japan) K Naraoka	14	21	21
(India) P Rajawat	21	10	14
(India) K George	19	17
(China) Weng HY	21	21

Second round
1	(China) Shi YQ	21	13	24
(China) Lu GZ	17	21	26
7	(Japan) K Naraoka	21	21
(China) Weng HY	19	17

Quarter-finals
(China) Lu GZ	19	21	21
7	(Japan) K Naraoka	21	17	12

==== Section 2 ====
First round
3	(Denmark) A Antonsen	17	13
(France) C Popov	21	21
(Denmark) R Gemke	21	16	14
(India) Prannoy H. S.	19	21	21
8	(France) A Lanier	23	17	11
(Singapore) Loh K Y	21	21	21
(Japan) Y Tanaka	19	15
(France) T J Popov	21	21

Second round
(France) C Popov	21	21
(India) Prannoy H. S.	16	14
(Singapore) Loh K Y	21	14	21
(France) T J Popov	12	21	18

Quarter-finals
(France) C Popov	21	21
(Singapore) Loh K Y	10	14

=== Bottom half ===
==== Section 3 ====
First round
(Chinese Taipei) Wang T-w	20	13
(Hong Kong) Lee C-y	22	21
(Chinese Taipei) Chi Y-j	18	15
6	(Chinese Taipei) Chou T-c	21	21
(India) L Sen	21	17	5^{r}
(Chinese Taipei) Lin C-y	15	21	13
(Japan) K Watanabe	12	14
4	(China) Li SF	21	21

Second round
(Hong Kong) Lee C-y	21	21
6	(Chinese Taipei) Chou T-c	12	16
(Chinese Taipei) Lin C-y	21	21
4	(China) Li SF	18	14

Quarter-finals
(Hong Kong) Lee C-y	15	13
(Chinese Taipei) Lin C-y	21	21

==== Section 4 ====
First round
(China) Lei LX
(Malaysia) Leong J H	w	/	o
PFR	(Republic of Ireland) N Nguyen	21	16
5	(Indonesia) J Christie	23	21
(China) Wang ZX	21	21
(Canada) B Yang	17	10
(Japan) K Nishimoto	13	15
2	(Thailand) K Vitidsarn	21	21

Second round
(Malaysia) Leong J H	21	21
5	(Indonesia) J Christie	16	19
(China) Wang ZX	8	17
2	(Thailand) K Vitidsarn	21	21

Quarter-finals
(Malaysia) Leong J H	13	11
2	(Thailand) K Vitidsarn	21	21

== Women's singles ==
=== Seeds ===
1. (South Korea) An Se-young (quarter-finals)
2. (China) Wang Zhiyi (final)
3. (China) Han Yue (semi-finals)
4. (Japan) Akane Yamaguchi (semi-finals)
5. (China) Chen Yufei (champion)
6. (Thailand) Pornpawee Chochuwong (quarter-finals)
7. (Japan) Tomoka Miyazaki (second round)
8. (Thailand) Supanida Katethong (second round)

=== Finals ===
Semi-finals
5	(China) Chen Yufei	12	21	21
3	(China) Han Yue	21	15	12
4	(Japan) Akane Yamaguchi	12	21	17
2	(China) Wang Zhiyi	21	12	21

Final
5	(China) Chen Yufei	21	21
2	(China) Wang Zhiyi	11	11

=== Top half ===
==== Section 1 ====
First round
1	(South Korea) An S-y	21	21
(China) Gao FJ	16	14
(Singapore) Yeo J M	21	21
(Thailand) B Ongbamrungphan	14	13
5	(China) Chen YF	21	24
(India) A Kharb	11	22
(India) P. V. Sindhu	21	21
(Canada) WY Zhang	14	9

Second round
1	(South Korea) An S-y	21	21
(Singapore) Yeo J M	14	13
5	(China) Chen YF	21	18	21
(India) P. V. Sindhu	9	21	16

Quarter-finals
1	(South Korea) An S-y	13	16
5	(China) Chen YF	21	21

==== Section 2 ====
First round
3	(China) Han Y	17	21	21
(India) A Kashyap	21	13	7
(India) R Ramraj	14	8
(South Korea) Kim G-e	21	21
8	(Thailand) S Katethong	14	21	21
(India) M Bansod	21	18	11
(Denmark) L Kjærsfeldt	14	21	10
(Japan) N Nidaira	21	15	21

Second round
3	(China) Han Y	21	21
(South Korea) Kim G-e	18	10
8	(Thailand) S Katethong	11	16
(Japan) N Nidaira	21	21

Quarter-finals
3	(China) Han Y	21	21
(Japan) N Nidaira	17	15

=== Bottom half ===
==== Section 3 ====
First round
(Canada) M Li	21	21
(Chinese Taipei) Hung Y-t	12	19
(Chinese Taipei) Lin H-t	16	17
7	(Japan) T Miyazaki	21	21
(Chinese Taipei) Sung S-y	21	21
(India) A Upadhyaya	12	16
(Ukraine) P Buhrova	15	13
4	(Japan) A Yamaguchi	21	21

Second round
(Canada) M Li	21	21
7	(Japan) T Miyazaki	17	18
(Chinese Taipei) Sung S-y	13	14
4	(Japan) A Yamaguchi	21	21

Quarter-finals
(Canada) M Li	15	20
4	(Japan) A Yamaguchi	21	22

==== Section 4 ====
First round
(Thailand) R Intanon	21	21
(Scotland) K Gilmour	8	12
(Chinese Taipei) Chiu P-c	13	15
6	(Thailand) P Chochuwong	21	21
(United States) BW Zhang	19	21	21
(Thailand) P Choeikeewong	21	16	19
(India) U Hooda	21	9	15
2	(China) Wang ZY	13	21	21

Second round
(Thailand) R Intanon	21	11	18
6	(Thailand) P Chochuwong	12	21	21
(United States) BW Zhang	15	9
2	(China) Wang ZY	21	21

Quarter-finals
6	(Thailand) P Chochuwong	17	19
2	(China) Wang ZY	21	21

== Men's doubles ==
=== Seeds ===
1. (Denmark) Kim Astrup / Anders Skaarup Rasmussen (semi-finals)
2. (Malaysia) Goh Sze Fei / Nur Izzuddin (quarter-finals)
3. (Malaysia) Aaron Chia / Soh Wooi Yik (champions)
4. (China) Liang Weikeng / Wang Chang (quarter-finals)
5. (South Korea) Kim Won-ho / Seo Seung-jae (final)
6. (Indonesia) Fajar Alfian / Muhammad Rian Ardianto (quarter-finals)
7. (Indonesia) Sabar Karyaman Gutama / Muhammad Reza Pahlevi Isfahani (second round)
8. (Malaysia) Man Wei Chong / Tee Kai Wun (quarter-finals)

=== Finals ===
Semi-finals
1	(Denmark) Kim Astrup (Denmark) Anders Skaarup Rasmussen	17	16
5	(South Korea) Kim Won-ho (South Korea) Seo Seung-jae	21	21
3	(Malaysia) Aaron Chia (Malaysia) Soh Wooi Yik	19	21	21
(India) Satwiksairaj Rankireddy (India) Chirag Shetty	21	10	18

Final
5	(South Korea) Kim Won-ho (South Korea) Seo Seung-jae	21	18	19
3	(Malaysia) Aaron Chia (Malaysia) Soh Wooi Yik	15	21	21

=== Top half ===
==== Section 1 ====
First round
1	(Denmark) K Astrup (Denmark) A S Rasmussen	21	21
(Chinese Taipei) Lee J-h (Chinese Taipei) Yang P-hs	6	14
(England) B Lane (England) S Vendy	20	21	15
(China) Xie HN (China) Zeng WH	22	15	21
6	(Indonesia) F Alfian (Indonesia) M R Ardianto	21	21
(Malaysia) N M Azriyn A (Malaysia) Tan W K	18	16
(Indonesia) L R Carnando (Indonesia) B Maulana	24	19	16
(Thailand) K Kedren (Thailand) D Puavaranukroh	22	21	21

Second round
1	(Denmark) K Astrup (Denmark) A S Rasmussen	21	21
(China) Xie HN (China) Zeng WH	15	15
6	(Indonesia) F Alfian (Indonesia) M R Ardianto	22	22
(Thailand) K Kedren (Thailand) D Puavaranukroh	20	20

Quarter-finals
1	(Denmark) K Astrup (Denmark) A S Rasmussen	21	21	24
6	(Indonesia) F Alfian (Indonesia) M R Ardianto	3	23	22

==== Section 2 ====
First round
4	(China) Liang WK (China) Wang C	11	21	21
(Japan) K Mitsuhashi (Japan) H Okamura	21	9	17
(Denmark) D Lundgaard (Denmark) M Vestergaard	21	15	17
(Chinese Taipei) Chiu H-c (Chinese Taipei) Wang C-l	19	21	21
5	(South Korea) Kim W-h (South Korea) Seo S-j	21	21
(Chinese Taipei) Liu K-h (Chinese Taipei) Yang P-ha	15	11
(China) Chen BY (China) Liu Yi	21	22	19
(France) C Popov (France) T J Popov	19	24	21

Second round
4	(China) Liang WK (China) Wang C	21	21
(Chinese Taipei) Chiu H-c (Chinese Taipei) Wang C-l	12	15
5	(South Korea) Kim W-h (South Korea) Seo S-j	18	21	21
(France) C Popov (France) T J Popov	21	15	19

Quarter-finals
4	(China) Liang WK (China) Wang C	20	22
5	(South Korea) Kim W-h (South Korea) Seo S-j	22	24

=== Bottom half ===
==== Section 3 ====
First round
(United States) Chen Z-y (United States) P Smith	12	11
(China) Huang D (China) Liu Ya	21	21
(Chinese Taipei) Chen Z-r (Chinese Taipei) Lin Y-c	18	19
8	(Malaysia) Man W C (Malaysia) Tee K W	21	21
(Japan) T Hoki (Japan) Y Kobayashi	21	21
(Malaysia) Ong Y S (Malaysia) Teo E Y	16	18
(Denmark) R Kjær (Denmark) F Søgaard	19	22
3	(Malaysia) A Chia (Malaysia) Soh W Y	21	24

Second round
(China) Huang D (China) Liu Ya	16	16
8	(Malaysia) Man W C (Malaysia) Tee K W	21	21
(Japan) T Hoki (Japan) Y Kobayashi	18	26	12
3	(Malaysia) A Chia (Malaysia) Soh W Y	21	24	21

Quarter-finals
8	(Malaysia) Man W C (Malaysia) Tee K W	20	17
3	(Malaysia) A Chia (Malaysia) Soh W Y	22	21

==== Section 4 ====
First round
(India) S Rankireddy (India) C Shetty	21	21
(Malaysia) Choong H J (Malaysia) M Haikal	16	13
(Japan) H Midorikawa (Japan) K Yamashita	15	16
7	(Indonesia) S K Gutama (Indonesia) M R P Isfahani	21	21
(France) É Adam (France) L Rossi	13	18
(Malaysia) J Arif (Malaysia) Yap R K	21	21
(Chinese Taipei) Lee F-c (Chinese Taipei) Lee F-j	13	11
2	(Malaysia) Goh S F (Malaysia) N Izzuddin	21	21

Second round
(India) S Rankireddy (India) C Shetty	19	21	21
7	(Indonesia) S K Gutama (Indonesia) M R P Isfahani	21	16	19
(Malaysia) J Arif (Malaysia) Yap R K	13	11
2	(Malaysia) Goh S F (Malaysia) N Izzuddin	21	21

Quarter-finals
(India) S Rankireddy (India) C Shetty	21	21
2	(Malaysia) Goh S F (Malaysia) N Izzuddin	17	15

== Women's doubles ==
=== Seeds ===
1. (China) Liu Shengshu / Tan Ning (semi-finals)
2. (Japan) Nami Matsuyama / Chiharu Shida (withdrew)
3. (South Korea) Baek Ha-na / Lee So-hee (quarter-finals)
4. (Malaysia) Pearly Tan / Thinaah Muralitharan (quarter-finals)
5. (Japan) Rin Iwanaga / Kie Nakanishi (final)
6. (China) Li Yijing / Luo Xumin (quarter-finals)
7. (South Korea) Kim Hye-jeong / Kong Hee-yong (champions)
8. (India) Treesa Jolly / Gayatri Gopichand (second round)

=== Finals ===
Semi-finals
1	(China) Liu Shengshu (China) Tan Ning	13	13
5	(Japan) Rin Iwanaga (Japan) Kie Nakanishi	21	21
(China) Jia Yifan (China) Zhang Shuxian	12	21	9
7	(South Korea) Kim Hye-jeong (South Korea) Kong Hee-yong	21	19	21

Final
5	(Japan) Rin Iwanaga (Japan) Kie Nakanishi	16	14
7	(South Korea) Kim Hye-jeong (South Korea) Kong Hee-yong	21	21

=== Top half ===
==== Section 1 ====
First round
1	(China) Liu SS (China) Tan N	21	21
(Hong Kong) Yeung N T (Hong Kong) Yeung P L	13	13
(Poland) P Hankiewicz (Poland) K Marczak	18	12
(Chinese Taipei) Teng C-h (Chinese Taipei) Yang C-y	21	21
6	(China) Li YJ (China) Luo XM	21	21
(Chinese Taipei) Sung S-y (Chinese Taipei) Yu C-h	12	9
(Thailand) L Kanlaha (Thailand) P Muenwong	15	10
(United States) L Lam (United States) A Lee	21	21

Second round
1	(China) Liu SS (China) Tan N	21	21
(Chinese Taipei) Teng C-h (Chinese Taipei) Yang C-y	13	17
6	(China) Li YJ (China) Luo XM	21	21
(United States) L Lam (United States) A Lee	12	17

Quarter-finals
1	(China) Liu SS (China) Tan N	21	21
6	(China) Li YJ (China) Luo XM	12	17

==== Section 2 ====
First round
3	(South Korea) Baek H-n (South Korea) Lee S-h	21	21
(India) K Selvam (India) S Singhi	4	9
(Thailand) P Phatcharaphisutsin (Thailand) N Sukklad	12	21	23
(Thailand) O Jongsathapornparn (Thailand) S Suwachai	21	15	21
5	(Japan) R Iwanaga (Japan) K Nakanishi	21	19	21
(Chinese Taipei) Hsieh P-s (Chinese Taipei) Hung E-t	19	21	17
(Chinese Taipei) Hsu Y-h (Chinese Taipei) Lin J-y	21	22
(Chinese Taipei) Hu L-f (Chinese Taipei) Jheng Y-c	15	20

Second round
3	(South Korea) Baek H-n (South Korea) Lee S-h	21	21
(Thailand) P Phatcharaphisutsin (Thailand) N Sukklad	13	9
5	(Japan) R Iwanaga (Japan) K Nakanishi	21	21
(Chinese Taipei) Hsu Y-h (Chinese Taipei) Lin J-y	15	9

Quarter-finals
3	(South Korea) Baek H-n (South Korea) Lee S-h	19	10
5	(Japan) R Iwanaga (Japan) K Nakanishi	21	21

=== Bottom half ===
==== Section 3 ====
First round
(China) Jia YF (China) Zhang SX	21	21
(Scotland) J MacPherson (Scotland) C Torrance	13	13
(Chinese Taipei) Chang C-h (Chinese Taipei) Yang C-t	14	21	17
8	(India) T Jolly (India) G Gopichand	21	19	21
(Japan) Y Fukushima (Japan) M Matsumoto	21	21
(United States) F Corbett (United States) J Gai	14	17
(Hong Kong) Lui L L (Hong Kong) Tsang H Y	16	18
4	(Malaysia) P Tan (Malaysia) Thinaah M	21	21

Second round
(China) Jia YF (China) Zhang SX	21	21
8	(India) T Jolly (India) G Gopichand	8	10
(Japan) Y Fukushima (Japan) M Matsumoto	23	18
4	(Malaysia) P Tan (Malaysia) Thinaah M	25	21

Quarter-finals
(China) Jia YF (China) Zhang SX	14	24	21
4	(Malaysia) P Tan (Malaysia) Thinaah M	21	22	14

==== Section 4 ====
First round
(Ukraine) P Buhrova (Ukraine) Y Kantemyr	22	15
(Canada) J Dent (Canada) C Lai	24	21
(Thailand) T Kleebyeesun (Thailand) N Laisuan	11	14
7	(South Korea) Kim H-j (South Korea) Kong H-y	21	21
(India) V Khadkekar (India) A Khan	8	9
(Australia) G Somerville (Australia) A Yu	21	21
(India) A Pramuthesh (India) S Singh	w	/	o
2	(Japan) N Matsuyama (Japan) C Shida

Second round
(Canada) J Dent (Canada) C Lai	10	13
7	(South Korea) Kim H-j (South Korea) Kong H-y	21	21
(Australia) G Somerville (Australia) A Yu	23	21
(India) A Pramuthesh (India) S Singh	21	7

Quarter-finals
7	(South Korea) Kim H-j (South Korea) Kong H-y	21	21
(Australia) G Somerville (Australia) A Yu	9	11

== Mixed doubles ==
=== Seeds ===
1. (Malaysia) Goh Soon Huat / Shevon Jemie Lai (quarter-finals)
2. (Hong Kong) Tang Chun Man / Tse Ying Suet (final)
3. (Malaysia) Chen Tang Jie / Toh Ee Wei (second round)
4. (China) Guo Xinwa / Chen Fanghui (semi-finals)
5. (Denmark) Jesper Toft / Amalie Magelund (quarter-finals)
6. (Thailand) Dechapol Puavaranukroh / Supissara Paewsampran (champions)
7. (Chinese Taipei) Yang Po-hsuan / Hu Ling-fang (first round)
8. (France) Thom Gicquel / Delphine Delrue (first round)

=== Finals ===
Semi-finals
6	(Thailand) Dechapol Puavaranukroh (Thailand) Supissara Paewsampran	21	21
(Chinese Taipei) Ye Hong-wei (Chinese Taipei) Nicole Gonzales Chan	12	12
4	(China) Guo Xinwa (China) Chen Fanghui	20	21	16
2	(Hong Kong) Tang Chun Man (Hong Kong) Tse Ying Suet	22	19	21

Final
6	(Thailand) Dechapol Puavaranukroh (Thailand) Supissara Paewsampran	21	21
2	(Hong Kong) Tang Chun Man (Hong Kong) Tse Ying Suet	16	9

=== Top half ===
==== Section 1 ====
First round
1	(Malaysia) Goh S H (Malaysia) Lai S J	21	21
PFR	(Ukraine) O Titov (Ukraine) Y Kantemyr	11	8
(Denmark) M Vestergaard (Denmark) C Busch	20	15
(China) Feng YZ (China) Wei YX	22	21
6	(Thailand) D Puavaranukroh (Thailand) S Paewsampran	19	21	22
(Malaysia) Wong T C (Malaysia) Lim C S	21	19	20
(China) Cheng X (China) Zhang C	21	21
(India) D Kapila (India) T Crasto	18	13

Second round
1	(Malaysia) Goh S H (Malaysia) Lai S J	21	21
(China) Feng YZ (China) Wei YX	11	19
6	(Thailand) D Puavaranukroh (Thailand) S Paewsampran	21	21
(China) Cheng X (China) Zhang C	19	18

Quarter-finals
1	(Malaysia) Goh S H (Malaysia) Lai S J	21	20	17
6	(Thailand) D Puavaranukroh (Thailand) S Paewsampran	19	22	21

==== Section 2 ====
First round
3	(Malaysia) Chen T J (Malaysia) Toh E W	21	21
(United States) P Smith (United States) J Gai	18	15
(Chinese Taipei) Ye H-w (Chinese Taipei) N G Chan	16	21	21
(Chinese Taipei) Liu K-h (Chinese Taipei) Jheng Y-c	21	16	9
8	(France) T Gicquel (France) D Delrue	21	19	19
(Japan) Y Watanabe (Japan) M Matsutomo	16	21	21
(Japan) Y Shimogami (Japan) S Hobara	21	21
(India) A Surya (India) A Pramuthesh	11	17

Second round
3	(Malaysia) Chen T J (Malaysia) Toh E W	18	18
(Chinese Taipei) Ye H-w (Chinese Taipei) N G Chan	21	21
(Japan) Y Watanabe (Japan) M Matsutomo	14	21	19
(Japan) Y Shimogami (Japan) S Hobara	21	12	21

Quarter-finals
(Chinese Taipei) Ye H-w (Chinese Taipei) N G Chan	23	20	21
(Japan) Y Shimogami (Japan) S Hobara	21	22	15

=== Bottom half ===
==== Section 3 ====
First round
(Indonesia) J Hidayatullah (Indonesia) F Pasaribu	21	21
(Chinese Taipei) Lu M-c (Chinese Taipei) Hung E-t	16	12
(Thailand) P Teeraratsakul (Thailand) P Muenwong	21	21
7	(Chinese Taipei) Yang P-hs (Chinese Taipei) Hu L-f	6	16
(Indonesia) R N Kusharjanto (Indonesia) G E Widjaja	21	21
(Singapore) T Hee (Singapore) Jin YJ	14	9
(Chinese Taipei) Chen C-k (Chinese Taipei) Hsu Y-h	21	12	19
4	(China) Guo XW (China) Chen FH	16	21	21

Second round
(Indonesia) J Hidayatullah (Indonesia) F Pasaribu	21	21
(Thailand) P Teeraratsakul (Thailand) P Muenwong	12	12
(Indonesia) R N Kusharjanto (Indonesia) G E Widjaja	16	20
4	(China) Guo XW (China) Chen FH	21	22

Quarter-finals
(Indonesia) J Hidayatullah (Indonesia) F Pasaribu	8	22
4	(China) Guo XW (China) Chen FH	21	24

==== Section 4 ====
First round
(Scotland) A Dunn (Scotland) J MacPherson	21	21
(Indonesia) R Rivaldy (Indonesia) P H Mentari	16	17
(Thailand) R Oupthong (Thailand) J Sudjaipraparat	20	18
5	(Denmark) J Toft (Denmark) A Magelund	22	21
(India) R Kapoor (India) R Gadde	21	21
(United States) Chen Z-y (United States) F Corbett	16	19
(Thailand) P Horbanluekit (Thailand) S Taerattanachai	16	5
2	(Hong Kong) Tang C M (Hong Kong) Tse Y S	21	21

Second round
(Scotland) A Dunn (Scotland) J MacPherson	13	14
5	(Denmark) J Toft (Denmark) A Magelund	21	21
(India) R Kapoor (India) R Gadde	10	16
2	(Hong Kong) Tang C M (Hong Kong) Tse Y S	21	21

Quarter-finals
5	(Denmark) J Toft (Denmark) A Magelund	21	14	14
2	(Hong Kong) Tang C M (Hong Kong) Tse Y S	15	21	21

Preceded by 2025 Malaysia Masters	BWF World Tour; 2025 BWF season	Succeeded by 2025 Indonesia Open
