= Badminton at the 2026 Asian Games – Mixed doubles =

Mixed Doubles at the 2026 Asian Games
- Venue: Ichinomiya City Municipal Gymnasium, Japan
- Dates: 25–29 September 2026
- Competitors: 29 pairs from 18 nations

Medalists
gold medal	Jiang Zhenbang; Wei Yaxin	China
silver medal	Amri Syahnawi; Nita Violina Marwah	Indonesia
bronze medal	Feng Yanzhe; Huang Dongping	China
bronze medal	Ye Hong-wei; Nicole Gonzales Chan	Chinese Taipei

}}

The mixed doubles badminton tournament at the 2026 Asian Games will be held from 25 to 29 September 2026 at the Ichinomiya City Municipal Gymnasium in Ichinomiya, Japan. The retired Chinese pair Zheng Siwei and Huang Yaqiong won the gold medal at the previous edition.

== Schedule ==
All times are Japanese Standard Time (UTC+09:00)

Date	Day	Time	Event
25 September	Friday	09:30	Round of 32
25 September	Friday	15:00	Round of 16
27 September	Sunday	09:30	Quarter-finals
28 September	Monday	09:30	Semifinals
29 September	Tuesday	11:00	Gold medal match

== Seeds ==
The top four Asian pairs were seeded based on the BWF World Rankings published on 25 August 2026.

1. Feng Yanzhe / Huang Dongping (CHN) (semi-finals)
2. Jiang Zhenbang / Wei Yaxin (CHN) (champions)
3. Dechapol Puavaranukroh / Supissara Paewsampran (THA) (first round)
4. Ye Hong-wei / Nicole Gonzales Chan (TPE) (semi-finals)

== Results ==
=== Elimination Round ===
==== Section 1 ====
Round of 32
Lui C W (HKG); Tse Y S (HKG)	21	21
B Odbayar (MGL); A Odbayar (MGL)	5	5
A Nibal (MDV); A N Abdul Razzaq (MDV)	8	7
D Kapila (IND); T Crasto (IND)	21	21
Yang P-h (TPE); Hu L-f (TPE)	14	11
Goh S H (MAS); S J Lai (MAS)	21	21

Round of 16
1	Feng YZ (CHN); Huang DP (CHN)	21	21
Lui C W (HKG); Tse Y S (HKG)	10	9
D Kapila (IND); T Crasto (IND)	22	24
Goh S H (MAS); S J Lai (MAS)	20	22

Quarter-finals
1	Feng YZ (CHN); Huang DP (CHN)	21	18	21
D Kapila (IND); T Crasto (IND)	14	21	18

==== Section 2 ====
Round of 32
3	D Puavaranukroh (THA); S Paewsampran (THA)	16	12
Y Watanabe (JPN); M Taguchi (JPN)	21	21
A Syahnawi (INA); N V Marwah (INA)	21	21
M Tajibullayev (KAZ); N Rakhmetullayeva (KAZ)	7	11
Jo S-h (KOR); Jeong N-e (KOR)	21	21
K Khanal (NEP); R Sherchan (NEP)	5	6
Trần Đ M (VIE); Phạm T K (VIE)	21	21
Pui C C (MAC); Pui C W (MAC)	8	13

Round of 16
Y Watanabe (JPN); M Taguchi (JPN)	21	18	15
A Syahnawi (INA); N V Marwah (INA)	9	21	21
Jo S-h (KOR); Jeong N-e (KOR)	21	21
Trần Đ M (VIE); Phạm T K (VIE)	9	17

Quarter-finals
A Syahnawi (INA); N V Marwah (INA)	21	12	21
Jo S-h (KOR); Jeong N-e (KOR)	9	21	19

==== Section 3 ====
Round of 32
N Joaquin (INA); S F S Ramadhanti (INA)	21	21
H Shaheed (MDV); F N Abdul Razzaq (MDV)	8	14
K Kulmatov (KAZ); A Zhumabek (KAZ)	2	10
R Oupthong (THA); J Sudjaipraparat (THA)	21	21
Y Shimogami (JPN); S Hobara (JPN)	21	21
B Bayarsaikhan (MGL); M Ganbaatar (MGL)	4	4
P Maharjan (NEP); R Maharjan (NEP)	14	9
4	Ye H-w (TPE); N G Chan (TPE)	21	21

Round of 16
N Joaquin (INA); S F S Ramadhanti (INA)	24	21	18
R Oupthong (THA); J Sudjaipraparat (THA)	26	17	21
Y Shimogami (JPN); S Hobara (JPN)	10	15
4	Ye H-w (TPE); N G Chan (TPE)	21	21

Quarter-finals
R Oupthong (THA); J Sudjaipraparat (THA)	18	14
4	Ye H-w (TPE); N G Chan (TPE)	21	21

==== Section 4 ====
Round of 32
A A Jumar (BAN); U Akter (BAN)	14	9
Chen T J (MAS); Cheng S Y (MAS)	21	21
Kim J-h (KOR); Jang H-j (KOR)	21	21
M A Larosh (PAK); M Shahzad (PAK)	1	10
Chan Y C (HKG); Ng T Y (HKG)	21	21
Leong I C (MAC); Ng W C (MAC)	8	13

Round of 16
Chen T J (MAS); Cheng S Y (MAS)	16	22	19
Kim J-h (KOR); Jang H-j (KOR)	21	20	21
Chan Y C (HKG); Ng T Y (HKG)	21	19	15
2	Jiang ZB (CHN); Wei YX (CHN)	16	21	21

Quarter-finals
Kim J-h (KOR); Jang H-j (KOR)	13	15
2	Jiang ZB (CHN); Wei YX (CHN)	21	21

=== Finals ===
Semi-finals
1	Feng Yanzhe (CHN); Huang Dongping (CHN)	12	14
Amri Syahnawi (INA); Nita Violina Marwah (INA)	21	21
4	Ye Hong-wei (TPE); Nicole Gonzales Chan (TPE)	13	9
2	Jiang Zhenbang (CHN); Wei Yaxin (CHN)	21	21

Gold medal match
Amri Syahnawi (INA); Nita Violina Marwah (INA)	19	8
2	Jiang Zhenbang (CHN); Wei Yaxin (CHN)	21	21
