= Ukraine Open =

Badminton tournament

The Ukraine Open is an annual badminton tournament held in Ukraine. The tournament is part of the Badminton Europe tournament series and is leveled in BWF International Challenge. The inaugural edition was held in 2022.

== Winners ==
Year	Men's singles	Women's singles	Men's doubles	Women's doubles	Mixed doubles
2022	(France) Christo Popov	(Turkey) Aliye Demirbağ	(Malaysia) Chia Wei Jie (Malaysia) Low Hang Yee	(Germany) Stine Küspert (Germany) Emma Moszczynski	(Germany) Jones Ralfy Jansen (Germany) Linda Efler
2023– 2024	No competition				

== Performances by nation ==
As of the 2022 edition

Pos.	Nation	MS	WS	MD	WD	XD	Total
1	Germany				1	1	2
2	France	1					1
2	Malaysia			1			1
2	Turkey		1				1
Total		1	1	1	1	1	5

== See also ==
- Ukraine International
