= Manami Suizu =

Japanese badminton player (born 2003)

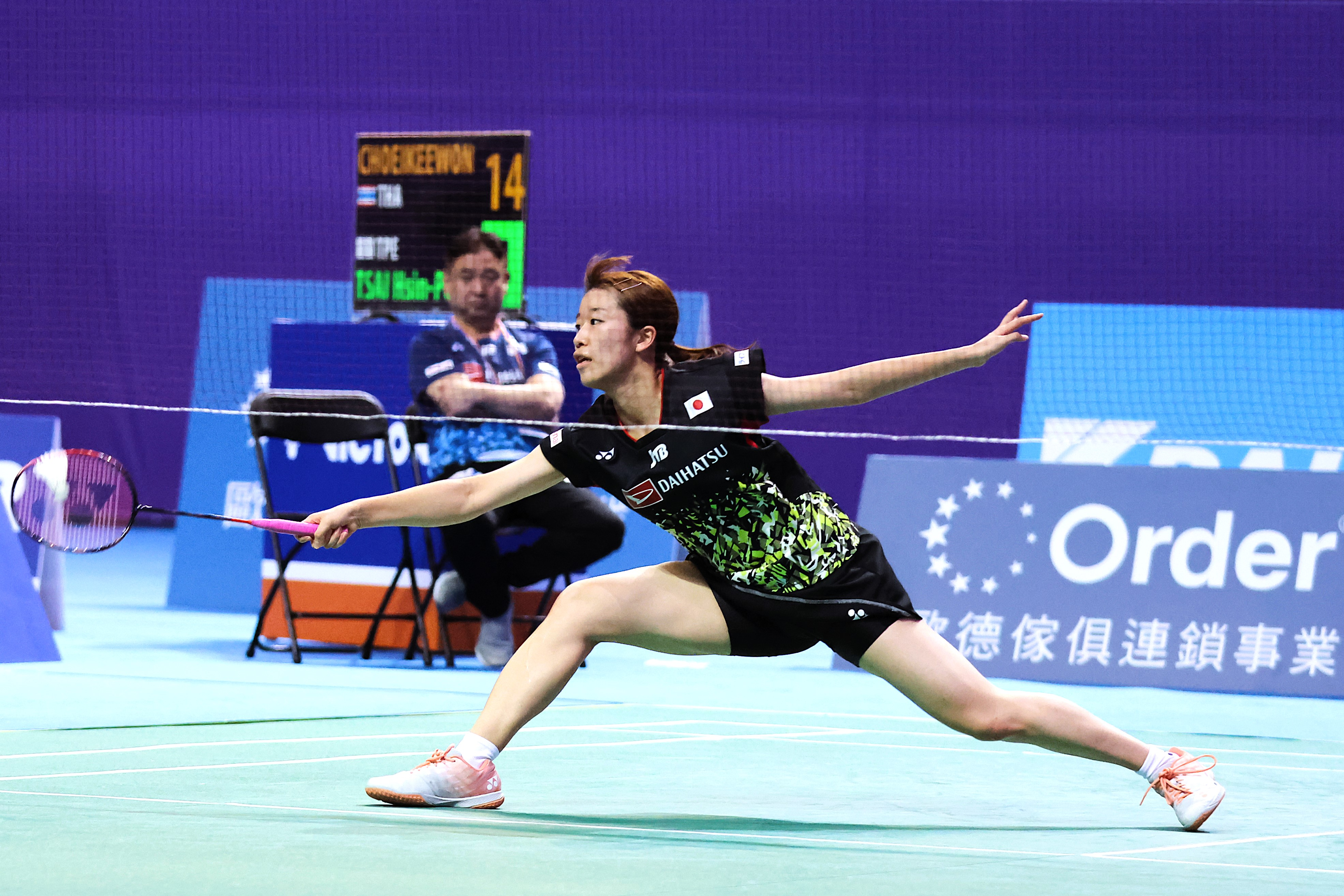
- Suizu at the 2023 Kaohsiung Masters

Personal information
- Born: 8 October 2003 (age 23) Yamaguchi Prefecture, Japan
- Height: 1.66 m (5 ft 5 in)

Sport
- Country: Japan
- Sport: Badminton
- Handedness: Right
- Coached by: Riichi Takeshita; Hajime Komiyama

Women's singles
- Career record: 94 wins, 47 losses (66.67%)
- Highest ranking: 30 (8 July 2025)
- Current ranking: 60 (10 November 2026)
- BWF profile

Manami Suizu (水津 愛美, Suizu Manami; born 8 October 2003) is a Japanese badminton player from Yamaguchi Prefecture. A member of the Japanese national team, she is currently affiliated with the ACT Saikyo team. She won her first BWF World Tour title at the 2025 Canada Open Super 300 and has also secured four International Challenge titles. She achieved a career-high women's singles world ranking of No. 30 on 8 July 2025.

== Early life and career ==
Manami Suizu, who is from Yamaguchi Prefecture, began playing badminton at the age of seven. She attended Yanai Junior High School and later Yanai Shōkō High School. Her older sister, Yui Suizu, is also a professional badminton player. During her junior international career, Suizu was the runner-up at the 2019 Korea Junior Open and won the title at the 2020 German Junior. In recognition of her results, she was awarded the Yamaguchi Prefecture "Medal of Glory" (Sports Award) in November 2020, an honor that recognizes residents for distinction in national or international sports. At the national level, she won the singles title at the 2021 National High School Invitational Championships and secured a third-place finish in singles at the Inter-High School Championships of the same year.

== Career ==
Suizu began her professional career on 1 April 2022, with the ACT Saikyo team. During her debut season, she reached the semifinals in three consecutive tournaments: the Polish International, the Bendigo International and the North Harbour International. Starting the year unranked, Suizu concluded 2022 with a world ranking of No. 189

Suizu won her first international senior title at the 2023 Mexican International. That year, she made her BWF World Tour debut, reaching the semifinals at the Super 100 Vietnam Open and the quarterfinals at the Super 300 Korea Masters. In 2024, she finished as the runner-up at the Super 100 Malaysia Masters and broke into the world's top 50 for the first time.

Suizu's first BWF World Tour title came in July 2025 at the Super 300 Canada Open. Earlier that year, she won two International Challenge titles: the Vietnam International and the Sri Lanka International, and her first senior national title at the Japan Ranking Circuit. She achieve a career-high world ranking of No. 30 on 8 July 2025.

In August 2026, Suizu won the Singapore International.

== Achievements ==
=== BWF World Tour (1 title, 1 runner-up) ===
The BWF World Tour, which was announced on 19 March 2017 and implemented in 2018, is a series of elite badminton tournaments sanctioned by the Badminton World Federation (BWF). The BWF World Tours are divided into levels of World Tour Finals, Super 1000, Super 750, Super 500, Super 300 (part of the HSBC World Tour), and the BWF Tour Super 100.

Women's singles
Year	Tournament	Level	Opponent	Score	Result	Ref.
2024	Malaysia Super 100	Super 100	(Japan) Kaoru Sugiyama	18–21, 14–21	(silver) Runner-up	
2025	Canada Open	Super 300	(Vietnam) Nguyễn Thùy Linh	21–12, 21–14	(gold) Winner	

=== BWF International Challenge/Series (4 titles) ===
Women's singles
Year	Tournament	Opponent	Score	Result	Ref.
2023	Mexican International	(Canada) Wenyu Zhang	21–13, 21–10	(gold) Winner	
2025	Sri Lanka International	(India) Adita Rao	21–12, 27–25	(gold) Winner	
2025	Vietnam International	(Thailand) Pitchamon Opatniputh	21–11, 21–9	(gold) Winner	
2026 (II)	Singapore International	(India) Tanvi Patri	19–21, 21–16, 21–14	(gold) Winner	

BWF International Challenge tournament

=== BWF Junior International (1 title, 1 runner-up) ===
Girls' singles
Year	Tournament	Opponent	Score	Result	Ref.
2019	Korea Junior Open	(South Korea) Lee So-yul	21–16, 14–21, 15–21	(silver) Runner-up	
2020	German Junior	(Indonesia) Stephanie Widjaja	18–21, 21–15, 21–17	(gold) Winner	

BWF Junior International Grand Prix tournament
BWF Junior International Challenge tournament

== Record against selected opponents ==
Record against Year-end Finals finalists, World Championships semi-finalists, and Olympic quarter-finalists. Accurate as of 7 January 2026.

Player	Matches	Win	Lost	Diff.
(China) Han Yue	2	0	2	–2
(Chinese Taipei) Tai Tzu-ying	1	0	1	–1
(India) P. V. Sindhu	1	0	1	–1
(Indonesia) Putri Kusuma Wardani	2	0	2	–2
(Japan) Nozomi Okuhara	1	0	1	–1
(South Korea) An Se-young	1	0	1	–1
