= 2024 Malaysia Super 100 =

Badminton tournament in Malaysia

Tournament details
- Dates: 15 – 20 October
- Edition: 2nd
- Level: Super 100
- Total prize money: US$100,000
- Venue: Stadium Juara
- Location: Bukit Kiara, Kuala Lumpur, Malaysia

Champions
- Men's singles: (Chinese Taipei) Chi Yu-jen
- Women's singles: (Japan) Kaoru Sugiyama
- Men's doubles: (Malaysia) Low Hang Yee (Malaysia) Ng Eng Cheong
- Women's doubles: (Malaysia) Go Pei Kee (Malaysia) Teoh Mei Xing
- Mixed doubles: (Chinese Taipei) Ye Hong-wei (Chinese Taipei) Nicole Gonzales Chan

The 2024 Malaysia Super 100 (officially known as BAM Malaysia Super 100 2024 for sponsorship reasons) was a badminton tournament which took place at the Stadium Juara in Bukit Kiara, Kuala Lumpur, Malaysia, from 15 to 20 October 2024 and had a total prize of $100,000.

== Tournament ==
The 2024 Malaysia Super 100 was the thirty-first tournament of the 2024 BWF World Tour and the second edition of the Malaysia Super 100 championships. This tournament was organized by the Badminton Association of Malaysia and sanctioned by the BWF.

=== Venue ===
This tournament was held at the Stadium Juara in Bukit Kiara, Kuala Lumpur, Malaysia.

=== Point distribution ===
Below is the point distribution table for each phase of the tournament based on the BWF points system for the BWF Tour Super 100 event.

| Winner | Runner-up | 3/4 | 5/8 | 9/16 | 17/32 | 33/64 | 65/128 | 129/256 |
|---|---|---|---|---|---|---|---|---|
| 5,500 | 4,680 | 3,850 | 3,030 | 2,110 | 1,290 | 510 | 240 | 100 |

=== Prize pool ===
The total prize money was US$100,000 with the distribution of the prize money in accordance with BWF regulations.

| Event | Winner | Finalist | Semi-finals | Quarter-finals | Last 16 |
| Singles | $7,500 | $3,800 | $1,450 | $600 | $350 |
| Doubles | $7,900 | $3,800 | $1,400 | $725 | $375 |

== Men's singles ==
=== Seeds ===
1. (Chinese Taipei) Chi Yu-jen (champion)
2. (India) Srikanth Kidambi (third round)
3. (Singapore) Jason Teh (final)
4. (Japan) Koo Takahashi (semi-finals)
5. (Malaysia) Justin Hoh (quarter-finals)
6. (Japan) Riku Hatano (semi-finals)
7. (Malaysia) Cheam June Wei (third round)
8. (Thailand) Panitchaphon Teeraratsakul (quarter-finals)

=== Finals ===
Semi-finals
1 | (Chinese Taipei) Chi Yu-jen | 26 | 21
4 | (Japan) Koo Takahashi | 24 | 8
3 | (Singapore) Jason Teh | 8 | 21 | 21
6 | (Japan) Riku Hatano | 21 | 18 | 11

Final
1 | (Chinese Taipei) Chi Yu-jen | 21 | 21 | 21
3 | (Singapore) Jason Teh | 12 | 23 | 15

=== Top half ===
==== Section 1 ====
First round
(Canada) S Gullaiya | 12 | 17
(Malaysia) Aidil S | 21 | 21
(Malaysia) Chia J H | 21 | 5
Q1 | (Thailand) P Arree | 23 | 21
(Sri Lanka) R Hendahewa | 16 | 18
(India) A Yeligar | 21 | 21
Q7 | (Malaysia) Ong T E | 17 | 10
(Indonesia) S H Rhustavito | 21 | 21

Second round
1 | (Chinese Taipei) Chi Y-j | 21 | 19 | 21
(Malaysia) Aidil S | 14 | 21 | 16
(Malaysia) Tan J J | 22 | 21
Q1 | (Thailand) P Arree | 20 | 19
5 | (Malaysia) J Hoh | 22 | 21
(India) A Yeligar | 20 | 14
Q5 | (Thailand) V Uraiwong | 15 | 16
(Indonesia) S H Rhustavito | 21 | 21

Third round
1 | (Chinese Taipei) Chi Y-j | 21 | 21
(Malaysia) Tan J J | 13 | 13
5 | (Malaysia) J Hoh | 21 | 17 | 21
(Indonesia) S H Rhustavito | 19 | 21 | 12

Quarter-finals
1 | (Chinese Taipei) Chi Y-j | 18 | 21 | 21
5 | (Malaysia) J Hoh | 21 | 17 | 6

==== Section 2 ====
First round
(India) M Manjunath | 16 | 8
(Malaysia) Kok J H | 21 | 21
Q3 | (Malaysia) M Ahmad Fairuzly | 19 | 10
(Japan) K Makino | 21 | 21
(Malaysia) M Atef H T | 17 | 20
(Malaysia) Ong Z Y | 21 | 22
(Chinese Taipei) Cheng K | 17 | 21 | 23
PFQ | (India) K K Mekala | 21 | 13 | 21

Second round
4 | (Japan) K Takahashi | 21 | 21
(Malaysia) Kok J H | 13 | 13
(Malaysia) S Shaqeem | 20 | 12
(Japan) K Makino | 22 | 21
7 | (Malaysia) Cheam J W | 19 | 21 | 21
(Malaysia) Ong Z Y | 21 | 15 | 15
(Chinese Taipei) Huang Y-k | 21 | 21
(Chinese Taipei) Cheng K | 19 | 14

Third round
4 | (Japan) K Takahashi | 21 | 21
(Japan) K Makino | 11 | 17
7 | (Malaysia) Cheam J W | 21 | 16 | 18
(Chinese Taipei) Huang Y-k | 14 | 21 | 21

Quarter-finals
4 | (Japan) K Takahashi | 21 | 21
(Chinese Taipei) Huang Y-k | 19 | 9

=== Bottom half ===
==== Section 3 ====
First round
PFQ | (Malaysia) Teh J H | 15 | 14
(India) K Gulshan Kumar | 21 | 21
Q2 | (Malaysia) M A Radin | 1 | 10
(Japan) Y Okimoto | 21 | 21
(Indonesia) I Rumbay | 21 | 21
Q6 | (Chinese Taipei) Chu C-j | 16 | 15
(India) S Subramanian | 21 | 9
(Myanmar) P P Naing | 10 | 3^{r}

Second round
(India) K Gulshan Kumar | 21 | 21
(Malaysia) Sie Z L | 8 | 13
(Japan) Y Okimoto | 15 | 15
8 | (Thailand) P Teeraratsakul | 21 | 21
(Indonesia) I Rumbay | 21 | 21
Q4 | (Thailand) S Ariyabaraneekul | 10 | 19
(India) S Subramanian | 17 | 13
3 | (Singapore) J Teh | 21 | 21

Third round
(India) K Gulshan Kumar | 12 | 19
8 | (Thailand) P Teeraratsakul | 21 | 21
(Indonesia) I Rumbay | 14 | 11
3 | (Singapore) J Teh | 21 | 21

Quarter finals
8 | (Thailand) P Teeraratsakul | 21 | 9 | 18
3 | (Singapore) J Teh | 18 | 21 | 21

==== Section 4 ====
First round
Q8 | (Malaysia) M H Mohamed Sikkander | 13 | 19
(Malaysia) S Lee | 21 | 21
(Myanmar) H Htut | 18 | 16
(Malaysia) E Ewe | 21 | 21
(Chinese Taipei) Ting Y-c | 21 | 21
(Thailand) N Pusri | 14 | 10
(Thailand) S Jamsri | 21 | 21
(Thailand) K Laotrakul | 19 | 14

Second round
(Malaysia) S Lee | 21 | 20 | 21
(Malaysia) Chua K S | 16 | 22 | 11
(Malaysia) E Ewe | 7 | 21 | 17
6 | (Japan) R Hatano | 21 | 15 | 21
(Chinese Taipei) Ting Y-c | 21 | 21
(Thailand) W Wongsup-in | 16 | 18
(Thailand) S Jamsri | 15 | 15
2 | (India) S Kidambi | 21 | 21

Third round
(Malaysia) S Lee | 21 | 5 | 11
6 | (Japan) R Hatano | 18 | 21 | 21
(Chinese Taipei) Ting Y-c | 21 | 21
2 | (India) S Kidambi | 16 | 15

Quarter-finals
6 | (Japan) R Hatano | 13 | 21 | 23
(Chinese Taipei) Ting Y-c | 21 | 10 | 21

== Women's singles ==
=== Seeds ===
1. (Chinese Taipei) Chiu Pin-chian (quarter-finals)
2. (Chinese Taipei) Lin Hsiang-ti (first round)
3. (Japan) Hina Akechi (first round)
4. (Japan) Asuka Takahashi (semi-finals)
5. (Japan) Manami Suizu (final)
6. (Japan) Kaoru Sugiyama (champion)
7. (Malaysia) Letshanaa Karupathevan (quarter-finals)
8. (Thailand) Lalinrat Chaiwan (second round)

=== Finals ===
Semi-finals
6 | (Japan) Kaoru Sugiyama | 17 | 21 | 21
4 | (Japan) Asuka Takahashi | 21 | 15 | 15
5 | (Japan) Manami Suizu | 19 | 21 | 21
(Japan) Akari Kurihara | 21 | 19 | 18

Final
6 | (Japan) Kaoru Sugiyama | 21 | 21
5 | (Japan) Manami Suizu | 18 | 14

=== Top half ===
==== Section 1 ====
First round
1 | (Chinese Taipei) Chiu P-c | 21 | 21
Q4 | (Hong Kong) Liang K W | 19 | 14
(Indonesia) B Prasista | 21 | 21
(Thailand) T Nithiittikrai | 18 | 19
6 | (Japan) K Sugiyama | 21 | 21
(Indonesia) A S Fatetani | 12 | 10
(Indonesia) Y Y Susanto | 21 | 21
(Thailand) N Rattanapanuwong | 16 | 17

Second round
1 | (Chinese Taipei) Chiu P-c | 21 | 21
(Indonesia) B Prasista | 16 | 13
6 | (Japan) K Sugiyama | 14 | 21 | 21
(Indonesia) Y Y Susanto | 21 | 14 | 12

Quarter-finals
1 | (Chinese Taipei) Chiu P-c | 8 | 21 | 17
6 | (Japan) K Sugiyama | 21 | 8 | 21

==== Section 2 ====
First round
4 | (Japan) A Takahashi | 21 | 21
(Malaysia) J Ng | 15 | 11
(Chinese Taipei) Han Y-c | 21 | 17 | 21
Q2 | (Chinese Taipei) Huang Z-l | 11 | 21 | 12
7 | (Malaysia) Letshanaa K | 21 | 21
Q1 | (Malaysia) Ung Y X | 10 | 8
(Chinese Taipei) Peng Y-w | 21 | 21
(Malaysia) Wong L C | 18 | 15

Second round
4 | (Japan) A Takahashi | 17 | 21 | 22
(Chinese Taipei) Han Y-c | 21 | 11 | 20
7 | (Malaysia) Letshanaa K | 21 | 21
(Chinese Taipei) Peng Y-w | 9 | 17

Quarter-finals
4 | (Japan) A Takahashi | 21 | 21
7 | (Malaysia) Letshanaa K | 19 | 16

=== Bottom half ===
==== Section 3 ====
First round
PFQ | (Malaysia) Oo S Z | 21 | 18 | 15
(Thailand) T Kleebyeesun | 14 | 21 | 21
(Switzerland) M Schnider | 12 | 9
5 | (Japan) M Suizu | 21 | 21
(Chinese Taipei) Hung Y-t | 21 | 21
(India) I Sharma | 11 | 11
(Japan) S Masuki | 21 | 22
3 | (Japan) H Akechi | 19 | 20

Second round
(Thailand) T Kleebyeesun | 16 | 21 | 12
5 | (Japan) M Suizu | 21 | 18 | 21
(Chinese Taipei) Hung Y-t | 21 | 20 | 18
(Japan) S Masuki | 12 | 22 | 21

Quarter-finals
5 | (Japan) M Suizu | 21 | 21
(Japan) S Masuki | 14 | 16

==== Section 4 ====
First round
(Malaysia) S Nurshuhaini | 17 | 21
Q3 | (Malaysia) Ong X Y | 21 | 23
(United States) I Rusli | 5 | 8
8 | (Thailand) L Chaiwan | 21 | 21
(Chinese Taipei) Lee Y-h | 18 | 21 | 21
(Malaysia) Kisona S | 21 | 17 | 19
(Japan) A Kurihara | 22 | 21 | 21
2 | (Chinese Taipei) Lin H-t | 24 | 19 | 14

Second round
Q3 | (Malaysia) Ong X Y | 16 | 22 | 23
8 | (Thailand) L Chaiwan | 21 | 20 | 21
(Chinese Taipei) Lee Y-h | 12 | 9
(Japan) A Kurihara | 21 | 21

Quarter-finals
Q3 | (Malaysia) Ong X Y | 21 | 19 | 4
(Japan) A Kurihara | 17 | 21 | 21

== Men's doubles ==
=== Seeds ===
1. (Malaysia) Nur Mohd Azriyn Ayub / Tan Wee Kiong (quarter-finals)
2. (Chinese Taipei) Chen Zhi-ray / Lin Yu-chieh (quarter-finals)
3. (United States) Chen Zhi-yi / Presley Smith (final)
4. (Malaysia) Low Hang Yee / Ng Eng Cheong (champions)
5. (Chinese Taipei) Chang Ko-chi / Chen Xin-yuan (second round)
6. (Thailand) Chaloempon Charoenkitamorn / Worrapol Thongsa-nga (semi-finals)
7. (Chinese Taipei) Lu Ching-yao / Wu Guan-xun (first round)
8. (Japan) Kazuki Shibata / Naoki Yamada (withdrew)

=== Finals ===
Semi-finals
(Chinese Taipei) Wu Hsuan-yi (Chinese Taipei) Ye Hong-wei | 19 | 17
4 | (Malaysia) Low Hang Yee (Malaysia) Ng Eng Cheong | 21 | 21
3 | (United States) Chen Zhi-yi (United States) Presley Smith | 22 | 21 | 25
6 | (Thailand) Chaloempon Charoenkitamorn (Thailand) Worrapol Thongsa-nga | 24 | 19 | 23

Final
4 | (Malaysia) Low Hang Yee (Malaysia) Ng Eng Cheong | 19 | 21 | 21
3 | (United States) Chen Zhi-yi (United States) Presley Smith | 21 | 15 | 12

=== Top half ===
==== Section 1 ====
First round
1 | (Malaysia) N M Azriyn A (Malaysia) Tan W K | 21 | 21
Q4 | (Malaysia) C C James (Malaysia) N B N Luaran | 5 | 9
(Malaysia) Lee W C (Malaysia) Tan M K | 11 | 16
(Chinese Taipei) Chen S-f (Chinese Taipei) Huang T-i | 21 | 21
SWM | (Chinese Taipei) Chiang C-w (Chinese Taipei) Wei C-w | 21 | 17 | 19
(Malaysia) Kang K X (Malaysia) A Tai | 18 | 21 | 21
(Thailand) N Saengkham (Thailand) A Teerawiwat | 17 | 21 | 16
(Chinese Taipei) Wu H-y (Chinese Taipei) Ye H-w | 21 | 18 | 21

Second round
1 | (Malaysia) N M Azriyn A (Malaysia) Tan W K | 21 | 21
(Chinese Taipei) Chen S-f (Chinese Taipei) Huang T-i | 15 | 18
(Malaysia) Kang K X (Malaysia) A Tai | 16 | 19
(Chinese Taipei) Wu H-y (Chinese Taipei) Ye H-w | 21 | 21

Quarter-finals
1 | (Malaysia) N M Azriyn A (Malaysia) Tan W K | 19 | 15
(Chinese Taipei) Wu H-y (Chinese Taipei) Ye H-w | 21 | 21

==== Section 2 ====
First round
4 | (Malaysia) Low H Y (Malaysia) Ng E C | 16 | 21 | 21
(Japan) Y Noda (Japan) K Ogawa | 21 | 16 | 15
PFQ | (Malaysia) Kok J C (Malaysia) Siau Y H | 16 | 11
Q3 | (Malaysia) M Faiq (Malaysia) Lok H Q | 21 | 21
7 | (Chinese Taipei) Lu C-y (Chinese Taipei) Wu G-x | 12 | 13
(Japan) T Nomura (Japan) Y Shimogami | 21 | 21
(Japan) K Matsui (Japan) K Tamate | 21 | 21
(Malaysia) Lim T J (Malaysia) Wong T C | 13 | 19

Second round
4 | (Malaysia) Low H Y (Malaysia) Ng E C | 21 | 16 | 21
Q3 | (Malaysia) M Faiq (Malaysia) Lok H Q | 19 | 21 | 14
(Japan) T Nomura (Japan) Y Shimogami | 21 | 30
(Japan) K Matsui (Japan) K Tamate | 17 | 29

Quarter-finals
4 | (Malaysia) Low H Y (Malaysia) Ng E C | 21 | 21
(Japan) T Nomura (Japan) Y Shimogami | 10 | 12

=== Bottom half ===
==== Section 3 ====
First round
Q2 | (Malaysia) Choi J S (Malaysia) Liew X | 9 | 20
(Japan) M Kaneko (Japan) S Ota | 21 | 22
(Netherlands) T van der Lecq (Netherlands) B Wassink | 14 | 11
5 | (Chinese Taipei) Chang K-c (Chinese Taipei) Chen X-y | 21 | 21
(Malaysia) Lau Y S (Malaysia) Lee Y B | 21 | 21
PFQ | (Malaysia) M Adam (Malaysia) M T Mohd Shazlan | 7 | 10
(Malaysia) B Goonting (Malaysia) Fazriq R | 19 | 11
3 | (United States) Chen Z-y (United States) P Smith | 21 | 21

Second round
(Japan) M Kaneko (Japan) S Ota | 22 | 21
5 | (Chinese Taipei) Chang K-c (Chinese Taipei) Chen X-y | 20 | 13
(Malaysia) Lau Y S (Malaysia) Lee Y B | 24 | 19 | 15
3 | (United States) Chen Z-y (United States) P Smith | 22 | 21 | 21

Quarter-finals
(Japan) M Kaneko (Japan) S Ota | 21 | 15 | 19
3 | (United States) Chen Z-y (United States) P Smith | 12 | 21 | 21

==== Section 4 ====
First round
Q1 | (Malaysia) T Bolherry (Malaysia) Fan J X | 10 | 9
(Japan) T Aizawa (Japan) D Sano | 21 | 21
(Thailand) V Kanjanakeereewong (Thailand) N Laotherdpong | 15 | 14
6 | (Thailand) C Charoenkitamorn (Thailand) W Thongsa-nga | 21 | 21
(Malaysia) Boon X Y (Malaysia) Goh V S | 21 | 22 | 21
(Malaysia) Chia W J (Malaysia) Lwi S H | 16 | 24 | 17
(New Zealand) J K Ng (New Zealand) YS Zhao | 6 | 14
2 | (Chinese Taipei) Chen Z-r (Chinese Taipei) Lin Y-c | 21 | 21

Second round
(Japan) T Aizawa (Japan) D Sano | 12 | 19
6 | (Thailand) C Charoenkitamorn (Thailand) W Thongsa-nga | 21 | 21
(Malaysia) Boon X Y (Malaysia) Goh V S | 15 | 14
2 | (Chinese Taipei) Chen Z-r (Chinese Taipei) Lin Y-c | 21 | 21

Quarter-finals
6 | (Thailand) C Charoenkitamorn (Thailand) W Thongsa-nga | 21 | 21 | 21
2 | (Chinese Taipei) Chen Z-r (Chinese Taipei) Lin Y-c | 23 | 19 | 14

== Women's doubles ==
=== Seeds ===
1. (Chinese Taipei) Nicole Gonzales Chan / Yang Chu-yun (final)
2. (Thailand) Tidapron Kleebyeesun / Nattamon Laisuan (second round)
3. (Hong Kong) Lui Lok Lok / Tsang Hiu Yan (semi-finals)
4. (Malaysia) Go Pei Kee / Teoh Mei Xing (champions)
5. (Malaysia) Ho Lo Ee / Tan Zhing Yi (second round)
6. (Malaysia) Lee Zhi Qing / Tio Sue Xin (quarter-finals)
7. (Hong Kong) Leung Yuet Yee / Ng Wing Yung (second round)
8. (Malaysia) Tan Zhing Hui / Amanda Yap (quarter-finals)

=== Finals ===
Semi-finals
1 | (Chinese Taipei) Nicole Gonzales Chan (Chinese Taipei) Yang Chu-yun | 23 | 21
3 | (Hong Kong) Lui Lok Lok (Hong Kong) Tsang Hiu Yan | 21 | 18
4 | (Malaysia) Go Pei Kee (Malaysia) Teoh Mei Xing | 20 | 18
(Malaysia) Ng Qi Xuan (Malaysia) Yap Rui Chen | 22 | 20^{r}

Final
1 | (Chinese Taipei) Nicole Gonzales Chan (Chinese Taipei) Yang Chu-yun | 20 | 11
4 | (Malaysia) Go Pei Kee (Malaysia) Teoh Mei Xing | 22 | 21

=== Top half ===
==== Section 1 ====
First round

Second round
1 | (Chinese Taipei) N G Chan (Chinese Taipei) Yang C-y | 21 | 21
(Malaysia) Lee Y S (Malaysia) J Ng | 12 | 13
6 | (Malaysia) Lee Z Q (Malaysia) Tio S X | 25 | 21
(Malaysia) Liau B Y (Malaysia) D Siow | 23 | 16

Quarter-finals
1 | (Chinese Taipei) N G Chan (Chinese Taipei) Yang C-y | 21 | 21
6 | (Malaysia) Lee Z Q (Malaysia) Tio S X | 12 | 13

==== Section 2 ====
First round
(Chinese Taipei) Huang Z-l (Chinese Taipei) Wang S-m | 16 | 17
(Malaysia) Ong X Y (Malaysia) C Ting | 21 | 21

Second round
3 | (Hong Kong) Lui L L (Hong Kong) Tsang H Y | 21 | 21
(Malaysia) Chan W T (Malaysia) Chong J Y | 18 | 19
7 | (Hong Kong) Leung Y Y (Hong Kong) Ng W Y | 16 | 21 | 18
(Malaysia) Ong X Y (Malaysia) C Ting | 21 | 7 | 21

Quarter-finals
3 | (Hong Kong) Lui L L (Hong Kong) Tsang H Y | 21 | 21
(Malaysia) Ong X Y (Malaysia) C Ting | 17 | 17

=== Bottom half ===
==== Section 3 ====
First round
(Malaysia) Fe Fong (Malaysia) Fl Fong | 21 | 11 | 21
(Chinese Taipei) Lee Y-hs (Chinese Taipei) Lee Y-hu | 11 | 21 | 17

Second round
(Malaysia) Fe Fong (Malaysia) Fl Fong | 21 | 17
8 | (Malaysia) Tan Z H (Malaysia) A Yap | 23 | 21
(Malaysia) Cheng S H (Malaysia) Lee X J | 14 | 23 | 16
4 | (Malaysia) Go P K (Malaysia) Teoh M X | 21 | 21 | 21

Quarter-finals
8 | (Malaysia) Tan Z H (Malaysia) A Yap | 13 | 10
4 | (Malaysia) Go P K (Malaysia) Teoh M X | 21 | 21

==== Section 4 ====
First round

Second round
(Chinese Taipei) Tsai R-l (Chinese Taipei) Wang Y-z | 21 | 13 | 21
5 | (Malaysia) Ho L E (Malaysia) Tan Z Y | 19 | 21 | 17
(Malaysia) Ng Q X (Malaysia) Yap R C | 13 | 21 | 21
2 | (Thailand) T Kleebyeesun (Thailand) N Laisuan | 21 | 14 | 17

Quarter-finals
(Chinese Taipei) Tsai R-l (Chinese Taipei) Wang Y-z | 14 | 15
(Malaysia) Ng Q X (Malaysia) Yap R C | 21 | 21

== Mixed doubles ==
=== Seeds ===
1. (Chinese Taipei) Wu Hsuan-yi / Yang Chu-yun (semi-finals)
2. (Malaysia) Wong Tien Ci / Lim Chiew Sien (semi-finals)
3. (Japan) Yuichi Shimogami / Sayaka Hobara (final)
4. (Thailand) Phatharathorn Nipornram / Nattamon Laisuan (first round)
5. (Chinese Taipei) Ye Hong-wei / Nicole Gonzales Chan (champions)
6. (United States) Presley Smith / Jennie Gai (quarter-finals)
7. (India) Rohan Kapoor / Gadde Ruthvika Shivani (quarter-finals)
8. (Indonesia) Bobby Setiabudi / Melati Daeva Oktavianti (quarter-finals)

=== Finals ===
Semi-finals
1 | (Chinese Taipei) Wu Hsuan-yi (Chinese Taipei) Yang Chu-yun | 12 | 13
5 | (Chinese Taipei) Ye Hong-wei (Chinese Taipei) Nicole Gonzales Chan | 21 | 21
3 | (Japan) Yuichi Shimogami (Japan) Sayaka Hobara | 21 | 21
2 | (Malaysia) Wong Tien Ci (Malaysia) Lim Chiew Sien | 19 | 14

Final
5 | (Chinese Taipei) Ye Hong-wei (Chinese Taipei) Nicole Gonzales Chan | 21 | 12 | 22
3 | (Japan) Yuichi Shimogami (Japan) Sayaka Hobara | 19 | 21 | 20

=== Top half ===
==== Section 1 ====
First round
1 | (Chinese Taipei) Wu H-y (Chinese Taipei) Yang C-y | 21 | 21
(Malaysia) Lok H Q (Malaysia) C Ting | 15 | 18
(Malaysia) Loo B K (Malaysia) Ho L E | 21 | 17 | 21
(Chinese Taipei) Chang K-c (Chinese Taipei) Wang Y-z | 18 | 21 | 11
7 | (India) R Kapoor (India) Gadde R S | 21 | 21
(Malaysia) A Kok (United States) S Pan | 19 | 6
(Chinese Taipei) Lee Y-j (Chinese Taipei) Lee Y-h | 10 | 19
(Malaysia) Tan W L (Malaysia) Yap L | 21 | 21

Second round
1 | (Chinese Taipei) Wu H-y (Chinese Taipei) Yang C-y | 21 | 21
(Malaysia) Loo B K (Malaysia) Ho L E | 18 | 18
7 | (India) R Kapoor (India) Gadde R S | 21 | 21
(Malaysia) Tan W L (Malaysia) Yap L | 14 | 13

Quarter-finals
1 | (Chinese Taipei) Wu H-y (Chinese Taipei) Yang C-y | 22 | 21 | 21
7 | (India) R Kapoor (India) Gadde R S | 24 | 16 | 15

==== Section 2 ====
First round
4 | (Thailand) P Nipornram (Thailand) N Laisuan | 11 | 16
(Malaysia) Wee Y H (Malaysia) V Gobi | 21 | 21
(Malaysia) D Khoo (Malaysia) Tio S X | 21 | 20 | 9
(Malaysia) Poopathi V (Malaysia) Lai T C | 18 | 22 | 21
5 | (Chinese Taipei) Ye H-w (Chinese Taipei) N G Chan | 21 | 21
(Chinese Taipei) Chen S-f (Chinese Taipei) Tsai R-l | 18 | 16
(Malaysia) J Juan (Malaysia) V Ng | 16 | 16
(Malaysia) F Zaim (Malaysia) D Siow | 21 | 21

Second round
(Malaysia) Wee Y H (Malaysia) V Gobi | 21 | 21
(Malaysia) Poopathi V (Malaysia) Lai T C | 9 | 13
5 | (Chinese Taipei) Ye H-w (Chinese Taipei) N G Chan | 21 | 21
(Malaysia) F Zaim (Malaysia) D Siow | 14 | 18

Quarter-finals
(Malaysia) Wee Y H (Malaysia) V Gobi | 19 | 13
5 | (Chinese Taipei) Ye H-w (Chinese Taipei) N G Chan | 21 | 21

=== Bottom half ===
==== Section 3 ====
First round
(Macau) Leong I C (Macau) Ng W C | 21 | 21
(India) Kona T (India) S K P Kudaravalli | 12 | 10
(Japan) Y Noda (Japan) Y Kato | 20 | 15
8 | (Indonesia) B Setiabudi (Indonesia) M D Oktavianti | 22 | 21
(Chinese Taipei) Chu C-j (Chinese Taipei) Chiu P-c | 9 | 22 | 14
(Malaysia) Low H C (Malaysia) N Maisarah | 21 | 20 | 21
(India) A R Gupta (India) S Swain | 11 | 7
3 | (Japan) Y Shimogami (Japan) S Hobara | 21 | 21

Second round
(Macau) Leong I C (Macau) Ng W C | 15 | 8
8 | (Indonesia) B Setiabudi (Indonesia) M D Oktavianti | 21 | 21
(Malaysia) Low H C (Malaysia) N Maisarah
3 | (Japan) Y Shimogami (Japan) S Hobara | w | / | o

Quarter-finals
8 | (Indonesia) B Setiabudi (Indonesia) M D Oktavianti | 7 | 13
3 | (Japan) Y Shimogami (Japan) S Hobara | 21 | 21

==== Section 4 ====
First round
(Malaysia) Tan M K (Malaysia) Lee Y S | 12 | 12
(Malaysia) O Ting (Malaysia) Ng Q X | 21 | 21
(Malaysia) Ooi Y P (Malaysia) C Loh | 5 | 8
6 | (United States) P Smith (United States) J Gai | 21 | 21
(Chinese Taipei) Chen Z-r (Chinese Taipei) Wang S-m | w | / | o
(Chinese Taipei) Fang J-k (Chinese Taipei) Huang Z-l | w | / | o
(Malaysia) Tan K W (Malaysia) Tan S T | 17 | 18
2 | (Malaysia) Wong T C (Malaysia) Lim C S | 21 | 21

Second round
(Malaysia) O Ting (Malaysia) Ng Q X | 17 | 21 | 21
6 | (United States) P Smith (United States) J Gai | 21 | 18 | 23
2 | (Malaysia) Wong T C (Malaysia) Lim C S | w | / | o

Quarter-finals
6 | (United States) P Smith (United States) J Gai | 17 | 21 | 10
2 | (Malaysia) Wong T C (Malaysia) Lim C S | 21 | 15 | 21

| Preceded by 2024 Arctic Open | BWF World Tour; 2024 BWF season | Succeeded by 2024 Hylo Open; 2024 Indonesia Masters Super 100 II |
