= Low Hang Yee =

Malaysian badminton player (born 1997)

Low Hang Yee 刘航益
Personal information
- Born: 22 February 1997 (age 29) Selangor, Malaysia

Sport
- Country: Malaysia
- Sport: Badminton
- Handedness: Right

Men's doubles
- Highest ranking: 38 (with Ng Eng Cheong, 3 June 2025); 63 (with Chia Wei Jie, 22 November 2022)
- Current ranking: 58 (with Ng Eng Cheong, 7 July 2026)
- BWF profile

Low Hang Yee (Chinese: 劉航益; pinyin: Liú Hángyì; born 22 February 1997) is a Malaysian badminton player. He won his first international title at the 2022 Ukraine Open partnered with Chia Wei Jie.

== Career ==
Prior to 2019, he played mixed doubles with Cheah Yee See and were runners-up at the 2016 India International Series.

=== 2019 ===
Partnered with Ng Eng Cheong, they were runners-up at the Lao International and the Malaysia International. They were also part of the Malaysian squad that participated in the 2019 Badminton Asia Mixed Team Championships.

=== 2021 ===
In March, Low and Ng got into the quarter-finals of the Swiss Open where they won against 4th seeds Marcus Ellis and Chris Langridge but lost to Kim Astrup and Anders Skaarup Rasmussen in three games. He was selected as a backup player for the 2020 Thomas Cup. In October, he partnered with Chia Wei Jie and were semi-finalists at the Czech Open.

=== 2022 ===
In January, Low and Chia entered the final of the Swedish Open but lost out to Danny Bawa Chrisnanta and Andy Kwek. In the following week, they entered their second consecutive final and captured their first international title at the Ukraine Open. At the end of the year, Low resigned from the national team.

=== 2023 ===
Low then reunited with Ng and they won back-to-back titles at the Slovenia Open and Austrian Open in May, defeating compatriots Lwi Sheng Hao and Jimmy Wong in both finals. In the following month, the pair finished as runners-up at the Maldives International and China International. In July, they captured their third title of the year at the Mongolia International. In November, they reached their sixth season final at their home event, the KL Masters. They settled for second best after losing to Chen Cheng-kuan and Chen Sheng-fa.

=== 2024 ===
In the first half of the year, Low and Ng did not manage to win any tournaments they competed in. Their most notable run was a semi-final finish at the Kaohsiung Masters in June. In October, the pair advanced to their second Malaysia Super 100 final. They defeated Chen Zhi-yi and Presley Smith to claim their first title of the year.

== Achievements ==
=== BWF World Tour (1 title, 1 runner-up) ===
The BWF World Tour, which was announced on 19 March 2017 and implemented in 2018, is a series of elite badminton tournaments sanctioned by the Badminton World Federation (BWF). The BWF World Tours are divided into levels of World Tour Finals, Super 1000, Super 750, Super 500, Super 300, and the BWF Tour Super 100.

Men's doubles
Year	Tournament	Level	Partner	Opponent	Score	Result	Ref.
2023	Malaysia Super 100	Super 100	(Malaysia) Ng Eng Cheong	(Chinese Taipei) Chen Cheng-kuan (Chinese Taipei) Chen Sheng-fa	21–23, 17–21	(silver) Runner-up	
2024	Malaysia Super 100	Super 100	(Malaysia) Ng Eng Cheong	(United States) Chen Zhi-yi (United States) Presley Smith	19–21, 21–15, 21–12	(gold) Winner	

=== BWF International Challenge/Series (4 titles, 6 runners-up) ===
Men's doubles
Year	Tournament	Partner	Opponent	Score	Result
2019	Lao International	(Malaysia) Ng Eng Cheong	(Malaysia) Chooi Kah Ming (Malaysia) Low Juan Shen	21–18, 18–21, 14–21	(silver) Runner-up
2019	Malaysia International	(Malaysia) Ng Eng Cheong	(Indonesia) Leo Rolly Carnando (Indonesia) Daniel Marthin	21–17, 17–21, 11–21	(silver) Runner-up
2022	Swedish Open	(Malaysia) Chia Wei Jie	(Singapore) Danny Bawa Chrisnanta (Singapore) Andy Kwek	13–21, 21–23	(silver) Runner-up
2022	Ukraine Open	(Malaysia) Chia Wei Jie	(Denmark) Emil Lauritzen (Denmark) Mads Vestergaard	19–21, 22–20, 23–21	(gold) Winner
2023	Slovenia Open	(Malaysia) Ng Eng Cheong	(Malaysia) Lwi Sheng Hao (Malaysia) Jimmy Wong	22–20, 21–18	(gold) Winner
2023	Austrian Open	(Malaysia) Ng Eng Cheong	(Malaysia) Lwi Sheng Hao (Malaysia) Jimmy Wong	21–11, 21–17	(gold) Winner
2023	Maldives International	(Malaysia) Ng Eng Cheong	(Thailand) Pharanyu Kaosamaang (Thailand) Worrapol Thongsa-Nga	19–21, 16–21	(silver) Runner-up
2023	China International	(Malaysia) Ng Eng Cheong	(China) Chen Xujun (China) Peng Jianqin	19–21, 21–19, 14–21	(silver) Runner-up
2023	Mongolia International	(Malaysia) Ng Eng Cheong	(Malaysia) Chia Wei Jie (Malaysia) Liew Xun	21–17, 21–15	(gold) Winner

Mixed doubles
Year	Tournament	Partner	Opponent	Score	Result
2016	India International	(Malaysia) Cheah Yee See	(India) Satwiksairaj Rankireddy (India) K. Maneesha	11–5, 8–11, 10–12, 8–11	(silver) Runner-up

BWF International Challenge tournament
BWF International Series tournament
BWF Future Series tournament
