= Teoh Mei Xing =

Malaysian badminton player (born 1997)

Teoh Mei Xing 张湄鑫
Personal information
- Born: 张美馨; 6 March 1997 (age 29) Subang Jaya, Selangor, Malaysia
- Years active: 2015–2026
- Height: 1.63 m (5 ft 4 in)

Sport
- Country: Malaysia
- Sport: Badminton
- Handedness: Right
- Retired: 17 October 2026

Women's & mixed doubles
- Highest ranking: 17 (WD with Anna Cheong, 3 January 2023); 18 (WD with Go Pei Kee, 12 August 2025); 42 (WD with Amelia Alicia Anscelly, 2 March 2017); 35 (XD with Hoo Pang Ron, 8 August 2023); 227 (XD with Tee Kai Wun, 22 June 2021)
- BWF profile
Medal record
Women's badminton
Representing Malaysia
Sudirman Cup
Bronze medal – third place	2021 Vantaa	Mixed team
Bronze medal – third place	2023 Suzhou	Mixed team
Asia Team Championships
Bronze medal – third place	2022 Selangor	Women's team
SEA Games
Bronze medal – third place	2025 Thailand	Women's team

Teoh Mei Xing (simplified Chinese: 张湄鑫; traditional Chinese: 張湄鑫; pinyin: Zhāng Méixīn, born 6 March 1997) is a Malaysian former badminton player who competed in women's and mixed doubles. A two-time Sudirman Cup bronze medalist, Asian team championship bronze medalist and SEA Games bronze medalist, she was part of the Malaysian mixed teams that finished third at the 2021 and 2023 Sudirman Cups, the women's team that won bronze at the 2022 Badminton Asia Team Championships, and the women's team that secured bronze at the 2025 SEA Games.

At senior international level, Teoh won two BWF World Tour women's doubles titles, capturing the 2022 Syed Modi International, a Super 300 tournament, with Anna Cheong, and the 2024 Malaysia Super 100 with Go Pei Kee. She won her first international title at the 2021 Czech Open with Cheong, and together they reached a career-high women's doubles world ranking of number 17 on 3 January 2023. She subsequently partnered Go Pei Kee, with whom she reached a world ranking of number 18 on 12 August 2025 and won the 2024 Malaysia Super 100, defeating Chinese Taipei's Nicole Gonzales Chan and Yang Chu-yun in the final. In mixed doubles, she also won the 2021 Spanish International with Tee Kai Wun, as well as the 2022 Malaysia International and 2023 Maldives International with Hoo Pang Ron. Earlier in her career, she finished runners-up in women's doubles at the 2016 Swiss International and 2016 Scottish Open alongside Amelia Alicia Anscelly.

On 17 October 2026, Teoh announced her retirement from professional badminton at the age of 29, concluding a senior career spanning more than a decade. Her final competitive appearance came at the 2026 Malaysia Super 100 in Iskandar Puteri, Johor, where she partnered Tan Zhi Yang in mixed doubles and lost to South Korea's Jin Sung-ik and Lee Seung-hee in the first round. Following the tournament, she confirmed that she would not continue competing as an independent player.

== Achievements ==
=== BWF World Tour (2 titles) ===
The BWF World Tour, which was announced on 19 March 2017 and implemented in 2018, is a series of elite badminton tournaments sanctioned by the Badminton World Federation (BWF). The BWF World Tours are divided into levels of World Tour Finals, Super 1000, Super 750, Super 500, Super 300 (part of the HSBC World Tour), and the BWF Tour Super 100.

Women's doubles
Year	Tournament	Level	Partner	Opponent	Score	Result
2022	Syed Modi International	Super 300	(Malaysia) Anna Cheong	(India) Gayatri Gopichand (India) Treesa Jolly	21–12, 21–13	(gold) Winner
2024	Malaysia Super 100	Super 100	(Malaysia) Go Pei Kee	(Chinese Taipei) Nicole Gonzales Chan (Chinese Taipei) Yang Chu-yun	22–20, 21–11	(gold) Winner

=== BWF Grand Prix (1 runner-up) ===
The BWF Grand Prix had two levels, the Grand Prix and Grand Prix Gold. It was a series of badminton tournaments sanctioned by the Badminton World Federation (BWF) and played between 2007 and 2017.

Women's doubles
Year	Tournament	Partner	Opponent	Score	Result
2016	Scottish Open	(Malaysia) Amelia Alicia Anscelly	(Malaysia) Lim Yin Loo (Malaysia) Yap Cheng Wen	17–21, 13–21	(silver) Runner-up

BWF Grand Prix Gold tournament
BWF Grand Prix tournament

=== BWF International Challenge/Series (4 titles, 5 runners-up) ===
Women's doubles
Year	Tournament	Partner	Opponent	Score	Result
2016	Swiss International	(Malaysia) Amelia Alicia Anscelly	(Netherlands) Cheryl Seinen (Netherlands) Iris Tabeling	21–13, 20–22, 10–21	(silver) Runner-up
2019	India International	(Malaysia) Yap Ling	(Malaysia) Pearly Tan (Malaysia) Thinaah Muralitharan	18–21, 14–21	(silver) Runner-up
2021	Czech Open	(Malaysia) Anna Cheong	(Indonesia) Febby Valencia Dwijayanti Gani (Indonesia) Jesita Putri Miantoro	21–15, 16–21, 21–17	(gold) Winner
2021	Scottish Open	(Malaysia) Anna Cheong	(Canada) Rachel Honderich (Canada) Kristen Tsai	14–21, 12–21	(silver) Runner-up
2023	Iran Fajr International	(Malaysia) Go Pei Kee	(Indonesia) Jesita Putri Miantoro (Indonesia) Febi Setianingrum	22–20, 16–21, 17–21	(silver) Runner-up

Mixed doubles
Year	Tournament	Partner	Opponent	Score	Result
2021	Spanish International	(Malaysia) Tee Kai Wun	(England) Callum Hemming (England) Jessica Pugh	21–15, 13–21, 21–19	(gold) Winner
2022	Malaysia International	(Malaysia) Hoo Pang Ron	(Malaysia) Chen Tang Jie (Malaysia) Toh Ee Wei	18–21, 21–15, 21–19	(gold) Winner
2023	Iran Fajr International	(Malaysia) Hoo Pang Ron	(Malaysia) Chen Tang Jie (Malaysia) Toh Ee Wei	19–21, 15–21	(silver) Runner-up
2023	Maldives International	(Malaysia) Hoo Pang Ron	(United States) Vinson Chiu (United States) Jennie Gai	21–13, 21–18	(gold) Winner

BWF International Challenge tournament
BWF International Series tournament
BWF Future Series tournament
