= Kaoru Sugiyama =

Japanese badminton player (born 2003)

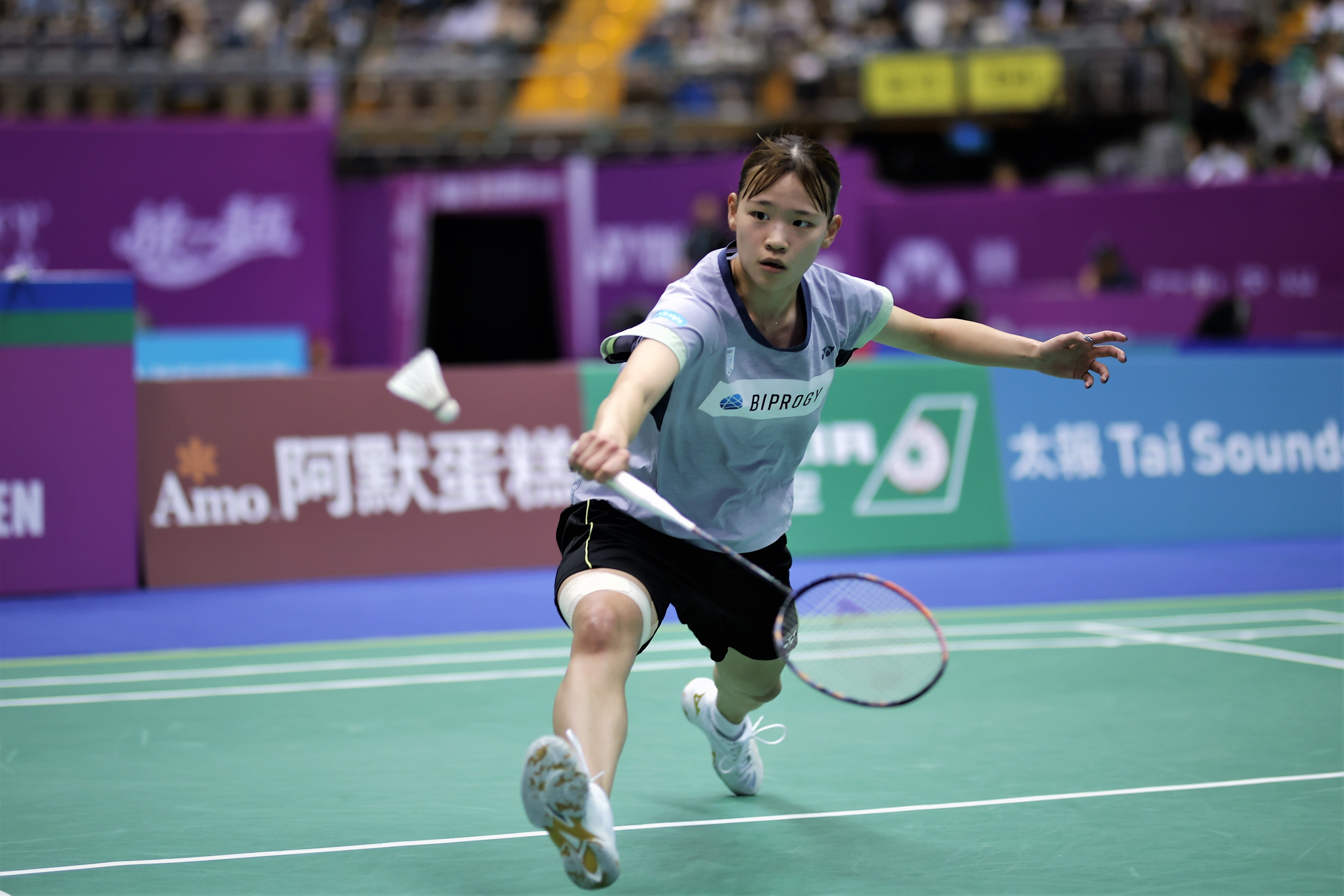
- Sugiyama at the 2024 Taipei Open

Personal information
- Born: 6 June 2003 (age 23) Tsukuba, Ibaraki, Japan
- Height: 1.64 m (5 ft 5 in)

Sport
- Country: Japan
- Sport: Badminton
- Handedness: Right
- Coached by: Takako Ida; Shōji Satō

Women's singles
- Highest ranking: 31 (18 February 2025)
- BWF profile
Medal record
Women's badminton
Representing Japan
Asia Mixed Team Championships
Bronze medal – third place	2025 Qingdao	Mixed team

Kaoru Sugiyama (杉山 薫, Sugiyama Kaoru; born 6 June 2003) is a Japanese badminton player affiliated with BIPROGY team since April 2022. She is a member of the Japan national badminton team (team B).

== Achievements ==
=== BWF World Tour (2 titles, 1 runner-up) ===
The BWF World Tour, which was announced on 19 March 2017 and implemented in 2018, is a series of elite badminton tournaments sanctioned by the Badminton World Federation (BWF). The BWF World Tour is divided into levels of World Tour Finals, Super 1000, Super 750, Super 500, Super 300 (part of the HSBC World Tour), and the BWF Tour Super 100.

Women's singles
Year	Tournament	Level	Opponent	Score	Result
2024	Ruichang China Masters	Super 100	(Chinese Taipei) Chiu Pin-chian	21–14, 14–21, 21–13	(gold) Winner
2024	Vietnam Open	Super 100	(Vietnam) Nguyễn Thùy Linh	15–21, 20–22	(silver) Runner-up
2024	Malaysia Super 100	Super 100	(Japan) Manami Suizu	21–18, 21–14	(gold) Winner

=== BWF International Challenge/Series (3 titles, 2 runners-up) ===
Women's singles
Year	Tournament	Opponent	Score	Result
2022	Peru Challenge	(Spain) Clara Azurmendi	15–13 retired	(gold) Winner
2023	Réunion Open	(Japan) Hina Akechi	20–22, 10–21	(silver) Runner-up
2023	Peru Challenge	(Peru) Inés Castillo	21–3, 21–6	(gold) Winner
2024	Northern Marianas Open	(Japan) Sakura Masuki	21–17, 21–15	(gold) Winner

Women's doubles
Year	Tournament	Partner	Opponent	Score	Result	Ref.
2022	Maldives International	(Japan) Kaho Osawa	(Japan) Chisato Hoshi (Japan) Miyu Takahashi	16–21, 15–21	(silver) Runner-up	

BWF International Challenge tournament

== Record against selected opponents ==
Record against Year-end Finals finalists, World Championships semi-finalists, and Olympic quarter-finalists. Accurate as of 22 July 2025.

Player	Matches	Win	Lost	Diff.
(Indonesia) Gregoria Mariska Tunjung	1	0	1	–1
