= Sayaka Hobara =

Japanese badminton player (born 1998)

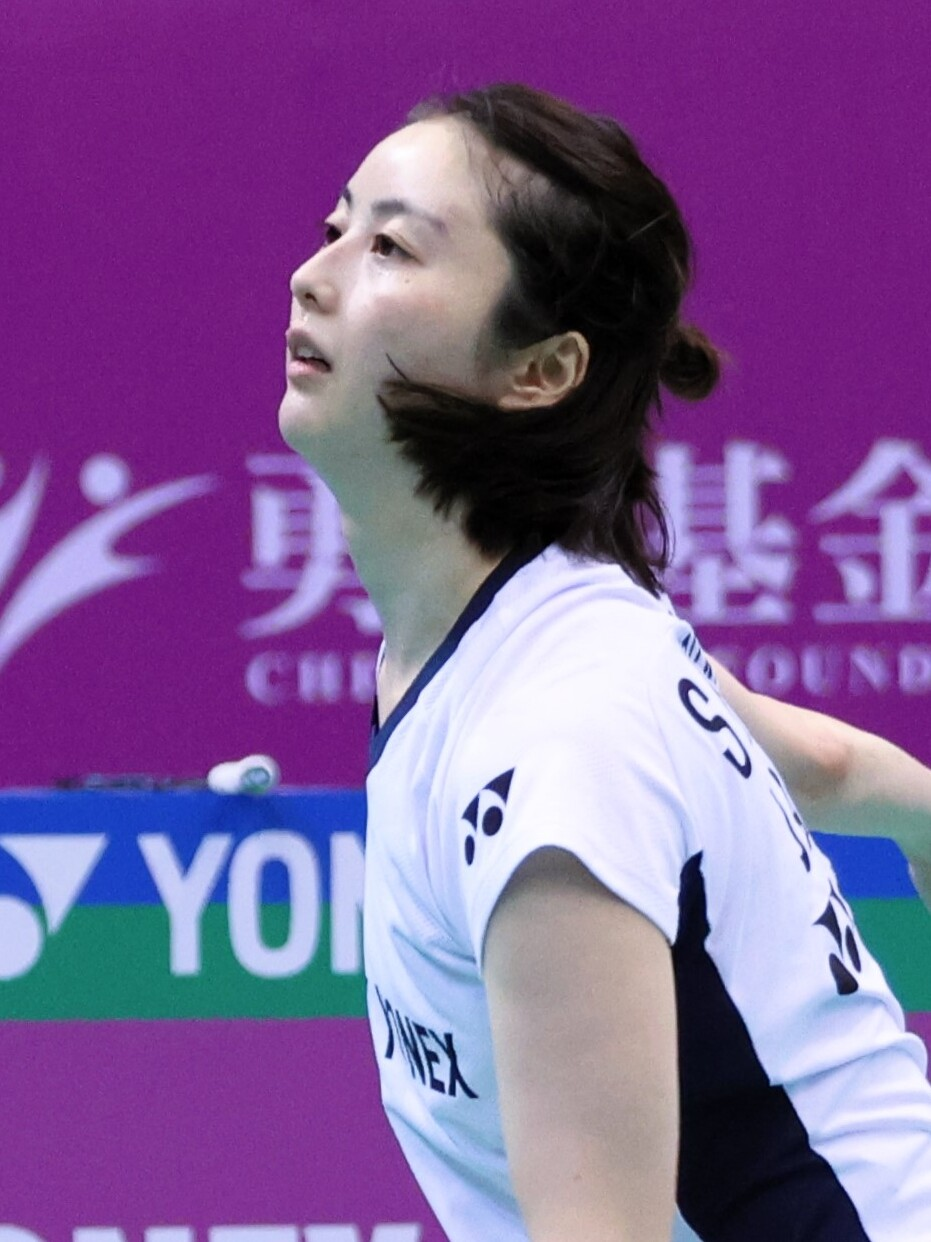
- Hobara at the 2025 Taipei Open

Personal information
- Born: 30 July 1998 (age 28) Ishinomaki, Miyagi Prefecture, Japan
- Height: 1.64 m (5 ft 5 in)

Sport
- Country: Japan
- Sport: Badminton
- Handedness: Left
- Coached by: Kei Nakashima

Women's & mixed doubles
- Highest ranking: 11 (WD with Rui Hirokami, 30 June 2026); 13 (XD with Yuichi Shimogami, 21 July 2026)
- Current ranking: 13 (WD with Rui Hirokami); 19 (XD with Yuichi Shimogami) (17 November 2026)
- BWF profile
Medal record
Women's badminton
Representing Japan
Sudirman Cup
Bronze medal – third place	2025 Xiamen	Mixed team
Asian Games
Silver medal – second place	2026 Aichi–Nagoya	Women's team
World Junior Championships
Gold medal – first place	2016 Bilbao	Girls' doubles
Bronze medal – third place	2016 Bilbao	Mixed team
Asian Junior Championships
Bronze medal – third place	2016 Bangkok	Mixed team

Sayaka Hobara (保原 彩夏, Hobara Sayaka; born 30 July 1998) is a Japanese badminton player. A left-handed player from Ishinomaki, Miyagi Prefecture, she is a former World Junior Champion, winning the girls' doubles title in 2016 with Nami Matsuyama. She competes in both women's and mixed doubles, achieving career-high world rankings of No. 11 in women's doubles and No. 13 in mixed doubles. Hobara was a member of the Japanese team that won the bronze medal at the 2025 Sudirman Cup.

== Career ==
=== 2022 ===
In 2022, Hobara partnered with Hinata Suzuki in women's doubles. On the BWF World Tour, their best result was a semifinal finish at the Taipei Open. They also reached the quarterfinals at the Super 500 Singapore Open and at two Super 100 events: the Canada Open and the Indonesia Masters. At the International Challenge level, they finished as runners-up at the Indonesia International.

=== 2023 ===
In 2023, Hobara partnered with Yui Suizu in women's doubles. They won the Mexican International and finished as runners-up at both the Saipan International and the Indonesia International. On the World Tour, their best results were semifinal finishes at the Korea Masters and the Indonesia Masters II. The pair achieved a career-high ranking of world No. 39 on 21 November 2023.

=== 2024 ===
In 2024, Hobara focused exclusively on mixed doubles, partnering with Yuichi Shimogami. On the World Tour, the pair finished as runner-up at the Malaysia Super 100 and had semifinal finishes at the Ruichang China Masters and the Vietnam Open. At the International Challenge level, they won the Northern Marianas Open and finished as runners-up at the Saipan International.

=== 2025 ===
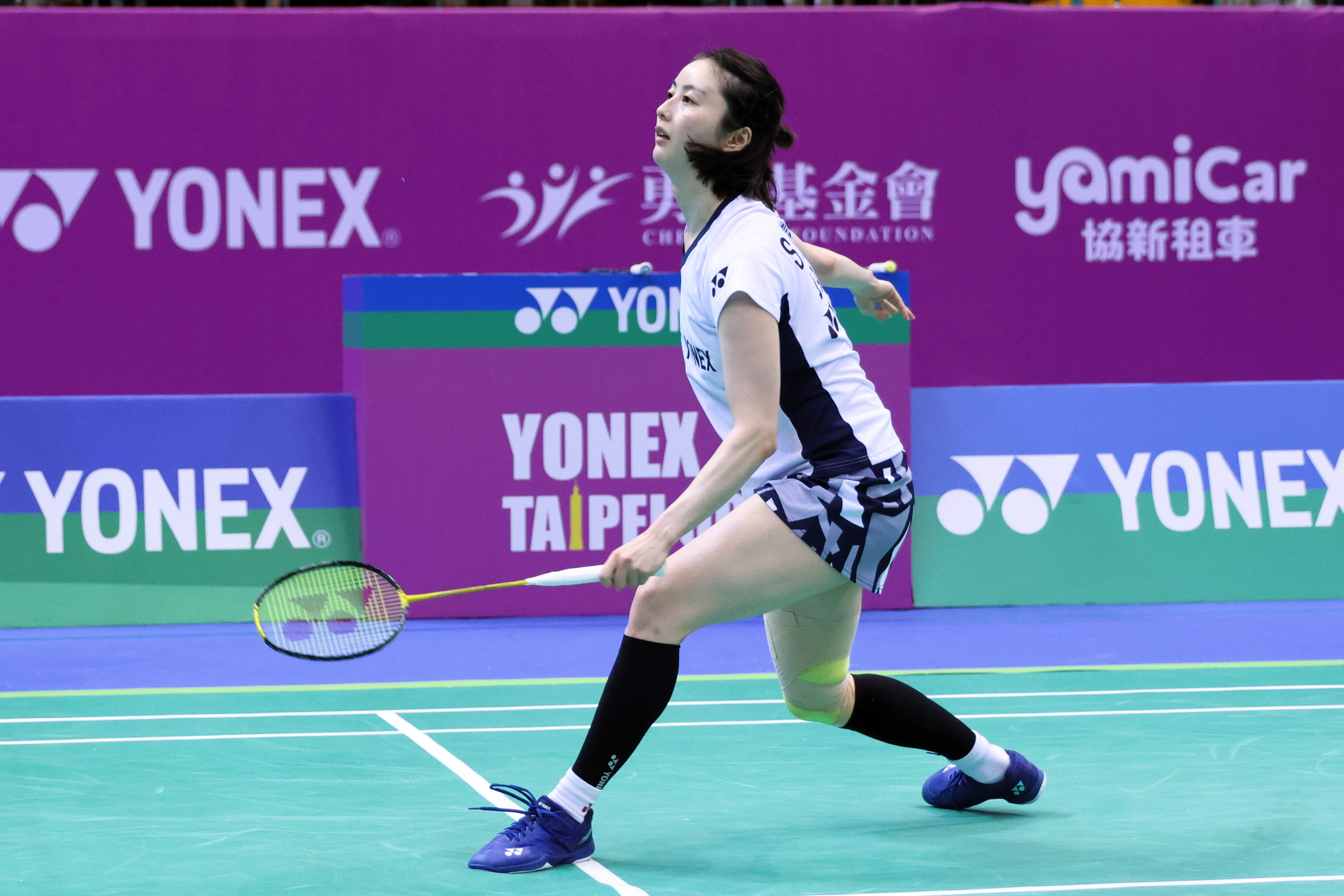
Hobara competing at the 2025 Kaohsiung Masters.

In 2025, Hobara began a new women's doubles partnership with Rui Hirokami. The pair reached the semifinals at three World Tour Super 500 tournaments: the Thailand Open and the Hong Kong Open. At the Thailand Open, they were the first qualifying doubles pair in any discipline to reach the semifinals since 2013. En route to the Hong Kong Open semifinals, they upset the newly crowned world champions Liu Shengshu and Tan Ning.

Continuing her mixed doubles partnership with Yuichi Shimogami, Hobara reached the semifinals at the Taipei Open and the quarterfinals at the Singapore Open and Japan Open. In this discipline, she made her debuts at both the World and Asian Championships and was a member of the Japanese team that won a bronze medal at the Sudirman Cup. The pair achieved a career-high world ranking of No. 20 on 29 July.

=== 2026 ===
In mixed doubles, Hobara and Shimogami reached their first Super 750 final at the Singapore Open, marking the best finish of their partnership to date. During their tournament run, they defeated All England champions Ye Hong-wei and Nicole Gonzales Chan in the first round, followed by a quarterfinal upset over second-seeded defending champions Dechapol Puavaranukroh and Supissara Paewsampran. They finished as runners-up, losing the final to Denmark's Mathias Christiansen and Alexandra Bøje.

With Hirokami, Hobara won her maiden BWF World Tour title at the Super 500 Korea Open, defeating South Korea's Kim Yu-jung and Lee Yu-lim.

== Achievements ==
=== World Junior Championships ===
Girls' doubles
Year	Venue	Partner	Opponent	Score	Result	Ref.
2016	Bilbao Arena, Bilbao, Spain	(Japan) Nami Matsuyama	(China) Du Yue (China) Xu Ya	25–23, 19–21, 21–14	Gold	

=== BWF World Tour (1 title, 2 runners-up) ===
The BWF World Tour, which was announced on 19 March 2017 and implemented in 2018, is a series of elite badminton tournaments sanctioned by the Badminton World Federation (BWF). The BWF World Tours are divided into levels of World Tour Finals, Super 1000, Super 750, Super 500, Super 300, and the BWF Tour Super 100.

Women's doubles
Year	Tournament	Level	Partner	Opponent	Score	Result	Ref.
2026	Korea Open	Super 500	(Japan) Rui Hirokami	(South Korea) Kim Yu-jung (South Korea) Lee Yu-lim	21–18, 21–18	(gold) Winner	

Mixed doubles
Year	Tournament	Level	Partner	Opponent	Score	Result	Ref.
2024	Malaysia Super 100	Super 100	(Japan) Yuichi Shimogami	(Chinese Taipei) Ye Hong-wei (Chinese Taipei) Nicole Gonzales Chan	19–21, 21–12, 20–22	(silver) Runner-up	
2026	Singapore Open	Super 750	(Japan) Yuichi Shimogami	(Denmark) Mathias Christiansen (Denmark) Alexandra Bøje	21–17, 12–21, 12–21	(silver) Runner-up	

=== BWF International Challenge/Series (5 titles, 5 runners-up) ===
Women's doubles
Year	Tournament	Partner	Opponent	Score	Result	Ref.
2018	Austrian International	(Japan) Natsuki Sone	(Japan) Chisato Hoshi (Japan) Kie Nakanishi	15–21, 18–21	(silver) Runner-up	
2019	Osaka International	(Japan) Natsuki Sone	(Japan) Rira Kawashima (Japan) Saori Ozaki	14–21, 21–10, 21–16	(gold) Winner	
2019	Maldives International	(Japan) Natsuki Sone	(India) Ashwini Ponnappa (India) N. Sikki Reddy	21–10, 17–21, 21–12	(gold) Winner	
2020	Jamaica International	(Japan) Rena Miyaura	(Peru) Daniela Macías (Peru) Dánica Nishimura	21–3, 21–7	(gold) Winner	
2022 (II)	Indonesia International	(Japan) Hinata Suzuki	(Indonesia) Lanny Tria Mayasari (Indonesia) Ribka Sugiarto	16–21, 18–21	(silver) Runner-up	
2023	Mexican International	(Japan) Yui Suizu	(United States) Francesca Corbett (United States) Allison Lee	21–11, 23–21	(gold) Winner	
2023	Saipan International	(Japan) Yui Suizu	(Chinese Taipei) Hsu Ya-ching (Chinese Taipei) Lin Wan-ching	10–21, 18–21	(silver) Runner-up	
2023 (II)	Indonesia International	(Japan) Yui Suizu	(Thailand) Laksika Kanlaha (Thailand) Phataimas Muenwong	18–21, 18–21	(silver) Runner-up	

Mixed doubles
Year	Tournament	Partner	Opponent	Score	Result	Ref.
2024	Northern Marianas Open	(Japan) Yuichi Shimogami	(Japan) Tori Aizawa (Japan) Hina Osawa	21–19, 21–12	(gold) Winner	
2024	Saipan International	(Japan) Yuichi Shimogami	(Japan) Hiroki Nishi (Japan) Akari Sato	11–21, 10–21	(silver) Runner-up	

BWF International Challenge tournament
BWF International Series tournament

=== BWF Junior International (3 titles, 2 runners-up) ===
Girls' doubles
Year	Tournament	Partner	Opponent	Score	Result	Ref.
2016	Dutch Junior	(Japan) Nami Matsuyama	(South Korea) Kim Ga-eun (South Korea) Kim Hyang-im	21–14, 22–20	(gold) Winner	
2016	German Junior	(Japan) Nami Matsuyama	(Japan) Kim Ga-eun (Japan) Kim Hyang-im	21–17, 21–13	(gold) Winner	
2016	India Junior International	(Japan) Nami Matsuyama	(Malaysia) Tew Jia Jia (Malaysia) Yee Yap	11–2, 11–8, 11–5	(gold) Winner	

Mixed doubles
Year	Tournament	Partner	Opponent	Score	Result
2016	Dutch Junior	(Japan) Naoki Yamazawa	(Japan) Hiroki Okamura (Japan) Nami Matsuyama	16–21, 19–21	(silver) Runner-up
2016	German Junior	(Japan) Hiroki Okamura	(Japan) Naoki Yamazawa (Japan) Nami Matsuyama	22–20, 14–21, 11–21	(silver) Runner-up

BWF Junior International Grand Prix tournament
