= Chi Yu-jen =

Taiwanese badminton player (born 1997)

Chi Yu-jen 戚又仁
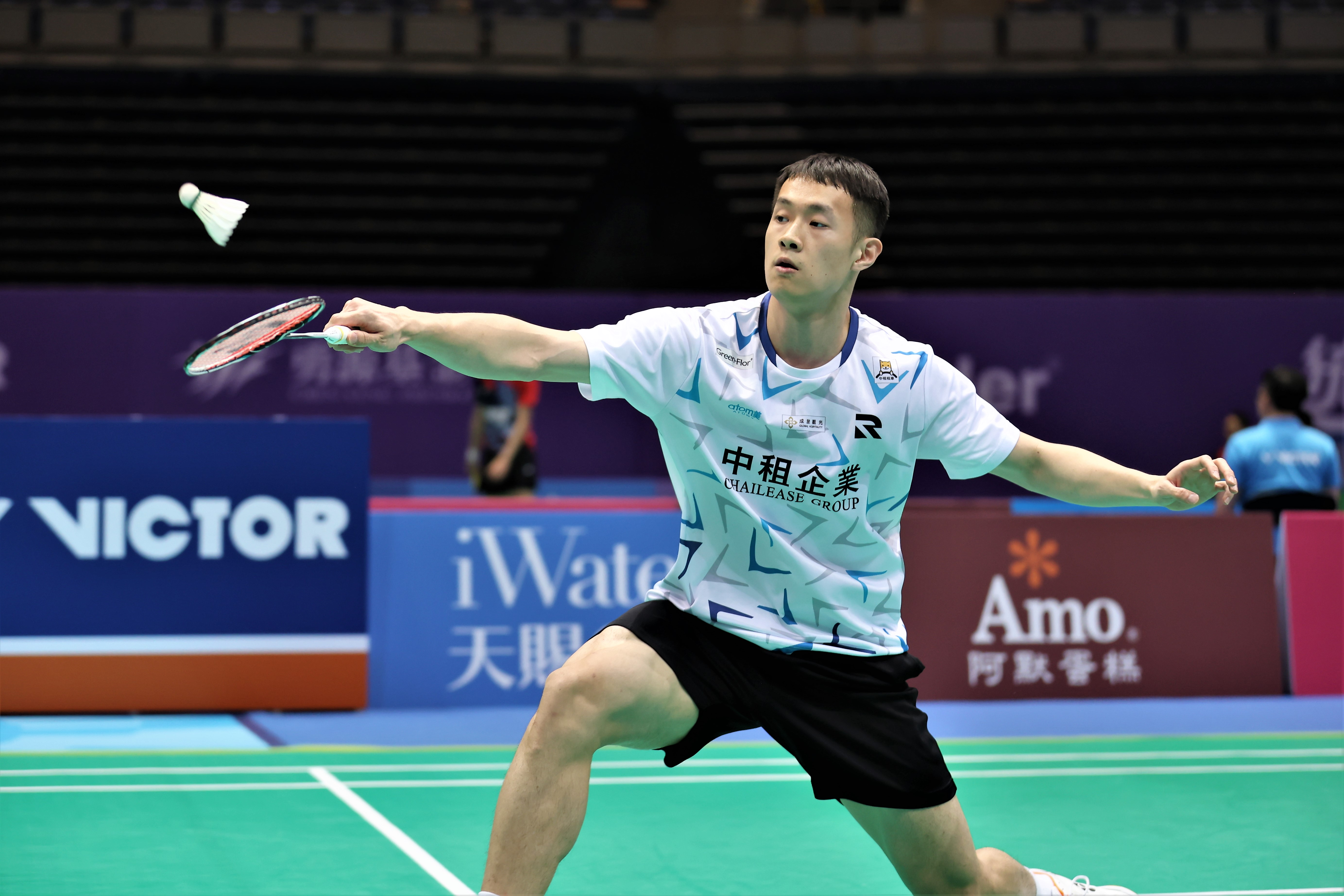
- Chi at the 2024 Kaohsiung Masters

Personal information
- Born: 25 June 1997 (age 29) Taiwan
- Height: 1.83 m (6 ft 0 in)
- Weight: 75 kg (165 lb)

Sport
- Country: Republic of China (Taiwan)
- Sport: Badminton
- Handedness: Right

Men's singles
- Highest ranking: 18 (26 May 2026)
- Current ranking: 24 (27 October 2026)
- BWF profile

Chi Yu-jen (Chinese: 戚又仁; pinyin: Qī Yòurén; born 25 June 1997) is a Taiwanese badminton player. He won his first BWF World Tour title at the 2023 Syed Modi International.

== Achievements ==
=== BWF World Tour (2 titles, 1 runner-up) ===
The BWF World Tour, which was announced on 19 March 2017 and implemented in 2018, is a series of elite badminton tournaments sanctioned by the Badminton World Federation (BWF). The BWF World Tour is divided into levels of World Tour Finals, Super 1000, Super 750, Super 500, Super 300, and the BWF Tour Super 100.

Men's singles
Year	Tournament	Level	Opponent	Score	Result	Ref.
2023	Syed Modi International	Super 300	(Japan) Kenta Nishimoto	20–22, 21–12, 21–17	(gold) Winner	
2024	Taipei Open	Super 300	(Chinese Taipei) Lin Chun-yi	17–21, 13–21	(silver) Runner-up	
2024	Malaysia Super 100	Super 100	(Singapore) Jason Teh	21–12, 21–23, 21–15	(gold) Winner	

=== BWF International Challenge/Series (2 titles, 2 runners-up) ===
Men's singles
Year	Tournament	Opponent	Score	Result
2019	Perth International	(Chinese Taipei) Liu Wei-chi	21–16, 21–18	(gold) Winner
2022	Slovak Open	(Japan) Riku Hatano	17–21, 15–21	(silver) Runner-up
2023	Thailand International	(Japan) Minoru Koga	21–15, 17–21, 20–22	(silver) Runner-up

Mixed doubles
Year	Tournament	Partner	Opponent	Score	Result
2019	Perth International	(Chinese Taipei) Lin Xiao-min	(Malaysia) Tan Kok Xian (Malaysia) Wong Kha Yan	21–16, 17–21, 21–17	(gold) Winner

BWF International Challenge tournament
BWF International Series tournament
BWF Future Series tournament
