= Nicole Gonzales Chan =

Taiwanese badminton player (born 2004)

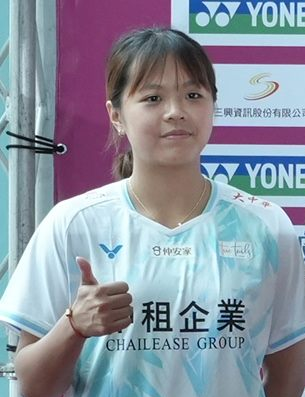
- Chan at the 2026 Taipei Open

Personal information
- Born: 13 December 2004 (age 21) Manila, Philippines

Sport
- Country: Republic of China (Taiwan)
- Sport: Badminton

Mixed doubles
- Highest ranking: 7 (with Ye Hong-wei, 6 October 2026)
- Current ranking: 8 (with Ye Hong-wei, 17 November 2026)
- BWF profile
Medal record
Women's badminton
Representing Chinese Taipei
Asian Games
Bronze medal – third place	2026 Aichi–Nagoya	Mixed doubles
World Junior Championships
Silver medal – second place	2022 Santander	Mixed team

Nicole Gonzales Chan (Chinese: 詹又蓁; pinyin: Zhān Yòuzhēn; born 13 December 2004) is a Taiwanese badminton player. She won the mixed doubles title at the 2026 All England Open, partnered with Ye Hong-wei.

== Achievements ==
=== Asian Games ===
Mixed doubles
Year	Venue	Partner	Opponent	Score	Result	Ref.
2026	Ichinomiya City Municipal Gymnasium; Ichinomiya, Japan	(Chinese Taipei) Ye Hong-wei	(China) Jiang Zhenbang (China) Wei Yaxin	13–21, 9–21	Bronze	

=== BWF World Tour (2 titles, 1 runners-up) ===
The BWF World Tour, which was announced on 19 March 2017 and implemented in 2018, is a series of elite badminton tournaments sanctioned by the Badminton World Federation (BWF). The BWF World Tour is divided into levels of World Tour Finals, Super 1000, Super 750, Super 500, Super 300 (part of the HSBC World Tour), and the BWF Tour Super 100.

Women's doubles
Year	Tournament	Level	Partner	Opponent	Score	Result
2024	Malaysia Super 100	Super 100	(Chinese Taipei) Yang Chu-yun	(Malaysia) Go Pei Kee (Malaysia) Teoh Mei Xing	20–22, 11–21	(silver) Runner-up

Mixed doubles
Year	Tournament	Level	Partner	Opponent	Score	Result
2024	Malaysia Super 100	Super 100	(Chinese Taipei) Ye Hong-wei	(Japan) Yuichi Shimogami (Japan) Sayaka Hobara	21–19, 12–21, 22–20	(gold) Winner
2026	All England Open	Super 1000	(Chinese Taipei) Ye Hong-wei	(France) Thom Gicquel (France) Delphine Delrue	21–19, 21–18	(gold) Winner

=== BWF International Challenge/Series (1 runners-up) ===
Mixed doubles
Year	Tournament	Partner	Opponent	Score	Result
2023	Saipan International	(Chinese Taipei) Wei Chun-wei	(United States) Presley Smith (United States) Allison Lee	22–20, 18–21, 14–21	(silver) Runner-up

BWF International Challenge tournament
BWF International Series tournament
BWF Future Series tournament
