= Malaysia Super 100 =

Annual badminton tournament in Malaysia

- Official website
- Founded: 2023; 3 years ago
- Editions: 4 (2026)
- Location: Iskandar Puteri (2026); Malaysia
- Venue: EduCity Sports Complex (2026)
- Prize money: US$120,000 (2026)

Men's
- Draw: 48S / 32D
- Current champions: Wang Zijun (singles); Jin Yong; Jo Song-hyun (doubles)

Women's
- Draw: 32S / 32D
- Current champions: Yuan Anqi (singles); Lee Seo-jin; Lee Yeon-woo (doubles)

Mixed doubles
- Draw: 32
- Current champions: Shen Xuanyao; Zhang Jiahan

Super 100
- Al Ain Masters; Akita Masters (2018–2019); Baoji China Masters; Dutch Open (2018–2019); Hyderabad Open (2018–2019); Indonesia Masters Super 100; Kaohsiung Masters; Malaysia Super 100; Guwahati Masters; Odisha Masters; Ruichang China Masters; Russian Open (2018–2019); Scottish Open (2018); Vietnam Open

Last completed
- 2026 Malaysia Super 100

The Malaysia Super 100 is an annual badminton tournament held in Malaysia. The tournament is a part of the BWF World Tour tournaments, categorized as part of the BWF Tour Super 100. The first edition was held in 2023 in Kuala Lumpur, Malaysia.

== Host cities ==
City	Years host
Kuala Lumpur	2023–2024
Iskandar Puteri	2025–present

Locations of Malaysia Super 100 host cities

== Winners ==
Year	Men's singles	Women's singles	Men's doubles	Women's doubles	Mixed doubles
2023	(Malaysia) Leong Jun Hao	(Thailand) Pitchamon Opatniputh	(Chinese Taipei) Chen Cheng-kuan (Chinese Taipei) Chen Sheng-fa	(Thailand) Laksika Kanlaha (Thailand) Phataimas Muenwong	(Malaysia) Chan Peng Soon (Malaysia) Cheah Yee See
2024	(Chinese Taipei) Chi Yu-jen	(Japan) Kaoru Sugiyama	(Malaysia) Low Hang Yee (Malaysia) Ng Eng Cheong	(Malaysia) Go Pei Kee (Malaysia) Teoh Mei Xing	(Chinese Taipei) Ye Hong-wei (Chinese Taipei) Nicole Gonzales Chan
2025	(China) Dong Tianyao	(Japan) Nozomi Okuhara	(Malaysia) Kang Khai Xing (Malaysia) Aaron Tai	(China) Luo Yi (China) Wang Tingge	(Japan) Yuta Watanabe (Japan) Maya Taguchi
2026	(China) Wang Zijun	(China) Yuan Anqi	(South Korea) Jin Yong (South Korea) Jo Song-hyun	(South Korea) Lee Seo-jin (South Korea) Lee Yeon-woo	(China) Shen Xuanyao (China) Zhang Jiahan

== Performances by nation ==
As of 2026 edition

Pos	Nation	MS	WS	MD	WD	XD	Total
1	China	2	1		1	1	5
1	Malaysia*	1		2	1	1	5
3	Chinese Taipei	1		1		1	3
3	Japan		2			1	3
5	South Korea			1	1		2
5	Thailand		1		1		2
Total		4	4	4	4	4	20

* Host nation

== See also ==
- Malaysia Open
- Malaysia Masters
- Malaysia International
