= 2025 BWF season =

Badminton World Federation circuit

Details
- Duration: 7 January – 28 December
- Edition: 19th
- Tournaments: 144
- Categories: Grade 1 – (Individuals, Mixed Teams): 2; Grade 2 – BWF World Tour Finals: 1; Grade 2 – Super 1000: 4; Grade 2 – Super 750: 6; Grade 2 – Super 500: 9; Grade 2 – Super 300: 10; Grade 2 – Super 100: 10; Grade 3 – International Challenge: 33; Grade 3 – International Series: 31; Grade 3 – Future Series: 26; Continental Championships: 10; Multisport: 2

Achievements (singles)

Awards
- Player of the year: (China) Shi Yuqi (Male) (South Korea) An Se-young (Female)

The 2025 BWF season was the overall badminton circuit organized by the Badminton World Federation (BWF) for the 2025 badminton season. The world badminton tournament in 2025 consists of:
1. BWF tournaments (Grade 1; Major Events)

- BWF World Mixed Team Championships (Sudirman Cup)
- BWF World Championships

2. BWF World Tour (Grade 2)

- Level 1 (BWF World Tour Finals)
- Level 2 (BWF World Tour Super 1000)
- Level 3 (BWF World Tour Super 750)
- Level 4 (BWF World Tour Super 500)
- Level 5 (BWF World Tour Super 300)
- Level 6 (BWF Tour Super 100)

3. Continental Circuit (Grade 3) BWF Open Tournaments: BWF International Challenge, BWF International Series, and BWF Future Series.

The Sudirman Cup was a team event. The others – Super 1000, Super 750, Super 500, Super 300, Super 100, International Challenge, International Series, and Future Series are all individual tournaments. The higher the level of tournament, the larger the prize money and the more ranking points available.

The 2025 BWF season calendar comprises these six levels of BWF tournaments.

== Schedule ==
This is the complete schedule of events on the 2025 calendar, with the champions and runners-up documented.

Key

Olympics
World Tour Finals
Super 1000
Super 750
Super 500
Super 300
Super 100
International Challenge
International Series
Future Series
Continental events/Team Events

=== January ===
Week commencing	Tournament	Champions	Runners-up
6 January	Malaysia Open (Draw): Dates: 7 January – 12 January; Host: Kuala Lumpur, Malaysia; Venue: Axiata Arena; Level: Super 1000; Prize: $1,450,000; Format: 32MS/32WS/32MD/32WD/32XD	(China) Shi Yuqi	(Denmark) Anders Antonsen
6 January	Malaysia Open (Draw): Dates: 7 January – 12 January; Host: Kuala Lumpur, Malaysia; Venue: Axiata Arena; Level: Super 1000; Prize: $1,450,000; Format: 32MS/32WS/32MD/32WD/32XD	Score: 21–8, 21–15	
6 January	Malaysia Open (Draw): Dates: 7 January – 12 January; Host: Kuala Lumpur, Malaysia; Venue: Axiata Arena; Level: Super 1000; Prize: $1,450,000; Format: 32MS/32WS/32MD/32WD/32XD	(South Korea) An Se-young	(China) Wang Zhiyi
6 January	Malaysia Open (Draw): Dates: 7 January – 12 January; Host: Kuala Lumpur, Malaysia; Venue: Axiata Arena; Level: Super 1000; Prize: $1,450,000; Format: 32MS/32WS/32MD/32WD/32XD	Score: 21–17, 21–7	
6 January	Malaysia Open (Draw): Dates: 7 January – 12 January; Host: Kuala Lumpur, Malaysia; Venue: Axiata Arena; Level: Super 1000; Prize: $1,450,000; Format: 32MS/32WS/32MD/32WD/32XD	(South Korea) Kim Won-ho (South Korea) Seo Seung-jae	(China) Chen Boyang (China) Liu Yi
6 January	Malaysia Open (Draw): Dates: 7 January – 12 January; Host: Kuala Lumpur, Malaysia; Venue: Axiata Arena; Level: Super 1000; Prize: $1,450,000; Format: 32MS/32WS/32MD/32WD/32XD	Score: 19–21, 21–12, 21–12	
6 January	Malaysia Open (Draw): Dates: 7 January – 12 January; Host: Kuala Lumpur, Malaysia; Venue: Axiata Arena; Level: Super 1000; Prize: $1,450,000; Format: 32MS/32WS/32MD/32WD/32XD	(Japan) Yuki Fukushima (Japan) Mayu Matsumoto	(China) Jia Yifan (China) Zhang Shuxian
6 January	Malaysia Open (Draw): Dates: 7 January – 12 January; Host: Kuala Lumpur, Malaysia; Venue: Axiata Arena; Level: Super 1000; Prize: $1,450,000; Format: 32MS/32WS/32MD/32WD/32XD	Score: 17–21, 21–15, 21–15	
6 January	Malaysia Open (Draw): Dates: 7 January – 12 January; Host: Kuala Lumpur, Malaysia; Venue: Axiata Arena; Level: Super 1000; Prize: $1,450,000; Format: 32MS/32WS/32MD/32WD/32XD	(Thailand) Dechapol Puavaranukroh (Thailand) Supissara Paewsampran	(China) Feng Yanzhe (China) Huang Dongping
6 January	Malaysia Open (Draw): Dates: 7 January – 12 January; Host: Kuala Lumpur, Malaysia; Venue: Axiata Arena; Level: Super 1000; Prize: $1,450,000; Format: 32MS/32WS/32MD/32WD/32XD	Score: 21–13, 19–21, 21–18	
6 January	Estonian International: Dates: 9 January – 12 January; Host: Tallinn, Estonia; Venue: Kalevi Spordihall; Level: International Series; Prize: $5,000; Format: 32MS/32WS/32MD/32WD/32XD	(Finland) Joakim Oldorff	(Denmark) Victor Ørding Kauffmann
6 January	Estonian International: Dates: 9 January – 12 January; Host: Tallinn, Estonia; Venue: Kalevi Spordihall; Level: International Series; Prize: $5,000; Format: 32MS/32WS/32MD/32WD/32XD	Score: 21–10, 21–13	
6 January	Estonian International: Dates: 9 January – 12 January; Host: Tallinn, Estonia; Venue: Kalevi Spordihall; Level: International Series; Prize: $5,000; Format: 32MS/32WS/32MD/32WD/32XD	(Finland) Nella Nyqvist	(Denmark) Anna Siess Ryberg
6 January	Estonian International: Dates: 9 January – 12 January; Host: Tallinn, Estonia; Venue: Kalevi Spordihall; Level: International Series; Prize: $5,000; Format: 32MS/32WS/32MD/32WD/32XD	Score: 21–16, 21–13	
6 January	Estonian International: Dates: 9 January – 12 January; Host: Tallinn, Estonia; Venue: Kalevi Spordihall; Level: International Series; Prize: $5,000; Format: 32MS/32WS/32MD/32WD/32XD	(England) Chua Yue Chern (England) Kelvin Ho	(India) Bhargav Arigela (India) Viswatej Gobburu
6 January	Estonian International: Dates: 9 January – 12 January; Host: Tallinn, Estonia; Venue: Kalevi Spordihall; Level: International Series; Prize: $5,000; Format: 32MS/32WS/32MD/32WD/32XD	Score: 21–16, 14–21, 21–11	
6 January	Estonian International: Dates: 9 January – 12 January; Host: Tallinn, Estonia; Venue: Kalevi Spordihall; Level: International Series; Prize: $5,000; Format: 32MS/32WS/32MD/32WD/32XD	(France) Margot Lambert (France) Camille Pognante	(France) Agathe Cuevas (France) Kathell Desmots-Chacun
6 January	Estonian International: Dates: 9 January – 12 January; Host: Tallinn, Estonia; Venue: Kalevi Spordihall; Level: International Series; Prize: $5,000; Format: 32MS/32WS/32MD/32WD/32XD	Score: 21–15, 21–18	
6 January	Estonian International: Dates: 9 January – 12 January; Host: Tallinn, Estonia; Venue: Kalevi Spordihall; Level: International Series; Prize: $5,000; Format: 32MS/32WS/32MD/32WD/32XD	(England) Ethan van Leeuwen (England) Abbygael Harris	(France) Grégoire Deschamp (France) Margot Lambert
6 January	Estonian International: Dates: 9 January – 12 January; Host: Tallinn, Estonia; Venue: Kalevi Spordihall; Level: International Series; Prize: $5,000; Format: 32MS/32WS/32MD/32WD/32XD	Score: 21–11, 21–14	
13 January	India Open (Draw): Dates: 14 January – 19 January; Host: New Delhi, India; Venue: K. D. Jadhav Indoor Stadium; Level: Super 750; Prize: $950,000; Format: 32MS/32WS/32MD/32WD/32XD	(Denmark) Viktor Axelsen	(Hong Kong) Lee Cheuk Yiu
13 January	India Open (Draw): Dates: 14 January – 19 January; Host: New Delhi, India; Venue: K. D. Jadhav Indoor Stadium; Level: Super 750; Prize: $950,000; Format: 32MS/32WS/32MD/32WD/32XD	Score: 21–16, 21–8	
13 January	India Open (Draw): Dates: 14 January – 19 January; Host: New Delhi, India; Venue: K. D. Jadhav Indoor Stadium; Level: Super 750; Prize: $950,000; Format: 32MS/32WS/32MD/32WD/32XD	(South Korea) An Se-young	(Thailand) Pornpawee Chochuwong
13 January	India Open (Draw): Dates: 14 January – 19 January; Host: New Delhi, India; Venue: K. D. Jadhav Indoor Stadium; Level: Super 750; Prize: $950,000; Format: 32MS/32WS/32MD/32WD/32XD	Score: 21–12, 21–9	
13 January	India Open (Draw): Dates: 14 January – 19 January; Host: New Delhi, India; Venue: K. D. Jadhav Indoor Stadium; Level: Super 750; Prize: $950,000; Format: 32MS/32WS/32MD/32WD/32XD	(Malaysia) Goh Sze Fei (Malaysia) Nur Izzuddin	(South Korea) Kim Won-ho (South Korea) Seo Seung-jae
13 January	India Open (Draw): Dates: 14 January – 19 January; Host: New Delhi, India; Venue: K. D. Jadhav Indoor Stadium; Level: Super 750; Prize: $950,000; Format: 32MS/32WS/32MD/32WD/32XD	Score: 21–15, 13–21, 21–16	
13 January	India Open (Draw): Dates: 14 January – 19 January; Host: New Delhi, India; Venue: K. D. Jadhav Indoor Stadium; Level: Super 750; Prize: $950,000; Format: 32MS/32WS/32MD/32WD/32XD	(Japan) Arisa Igarashi (Japan) Ayako Sakuramoto	(South Korea) Kim Hye-jeong (South Korea) Kong Hee-yong
13 January	India Open (Draw): Dates: 14 January – 19 January; Host: New Delhi, India; Venue: K. D. Jadhav Indoor Stadium; Level: Super 750; Prize: $950,000; Format: 32MS/32WS/32MD/32WD/32XD	Score: 21–15, 21–13	
13 January	India Open (Draw): Dates: 14 January – 19 January; Host: New Delhi, India; Venue: K. D. Jadhav Indoor Stadium; Level: Super 750; Prize: $950,000; Format: 32MS/32WS/32MD/32WD/32XD	(China) Jiang Zhenbang (China) Wei Yaxin	(France) Thom Gicquel (France) Delphine Delrue
13 January	India Open (Draw): Dates: 14 January – 19 January; Host: New Delhi, India; Venue: K. D. Jadhav Indoor Stadium; Level: Super 750; Prize: $950,000; Format: 32MS/32WS/32MD/32WD/32XD	Score: 21–18, 21–17	
13 January	Swedish Open: Dates: 16 January – 19 January; Host: Uppsala, Sweden; Venue: IFU Arena; Level: International Series; Prize: $10,000; Format: 32MS/32WS/32MD/32WD/32XD	(France) Arnaud Merklé	(Denmark) Jeppe Bruun
13 January	Swedish Open: Dates: 16 January – 19 January; Host: Uppsala, Sweden; Venue: IFU Arena; Level: International Series; Prize: $10,000; Format: 32MS/32WS/32MD/32WD/32XD	Score: 19–21, 21–16, 21–16	
13 January	Swedish Open: Dates: 16 January – 19 January; Host: Uppsala, Sweden; Venue: IFU Arena; Level: International Series; Prize: $10,000; Format: 32MS/32WS/32MD/32WD/32XD	(Turkey) Neslihan Arın	(France) Léonice Huet
13 January	Swedish Open: Dates: 16 January – 19 January; Host: Uppsala, Sweden; Venue: IFU Arena; Level: International Series; Prize: $10,000; Format: 32MS/32WS/32MD/32WD/32XD	Score: 21–14, 24–22	
13 January	Swedish Open: Dates: 16 January – 19 January; Host: Uppsala, Sweden; Venue: IFU Arena; Level: International Series; Prize: $10,000; Format: 32MS/32WS/32MD/32WD/32XD	(England) Chua Yue Chern (England) Kelvin Ho	(France) Maël Cattoen (France) Lucas Renoir
13 January	Swedish Open: Dates: 16 January – 19 January; Host: Uppsala, Sweden; Venue: IFU Arena; Level: International Series; Prize: $10,000; Format: 32MS/32WS/32MD/32WD/32XD	Score: 21–13, 21–17	
13 January	Swedish Open: Dates: 16 January – 19 January; Host: Uppsala, Sweden; Venue: IFU Arena; Level: International Series; Prize: $10,000; Format: 32MS/32WS/32MD/32WD/32XD	(Turkey) Bengisu Erçetin (Turkey) Nazlıcan İnci	(Sweden) Moa Sjöö (Sweden) Tilda Sjöö
13 January	Swedish Open: Dates: 16 January – 19 January; Host: Uppsala, Sweden; Venue: IFU Arena; Level: International Series; Prize: $10,000; Format: 32MS/32WS/32MD/32WD/32XD	Score: 21–14, 21–17	
13 January	Swedish Open: Dates: 16 January – 19 January; Host: Uppsala, Sweden; Venue: IFU Arena; Level: International Series; Prize: $10,000; Format: 32MS/32WS/32MD/32WD/32XD	(France) Grégoire Deschamp (France) Margot Lambert	(Denmark) Kristoffer Kolding (Denmark) Mette Werge
13 January	Swedish Open: Dates: 16 January – 19 January; Host: Uppsala, Sweden; Venue: IFU Arena; Level: International Series; Prize: $10,000; Format: 32MS/32WS/32MD/32WD/32XD	Score: 21–18, 21–18	
20 January	Indonesia Masters (Draw): Dates: 21 January – 26 January; Host: Jakarta, Indonesia; Venue: Istora Gelora Bung Karno; Level: Super 500; Prize: $475,000; Format: 32MS/32WS/32MD/32WD/32XD	(Thailand) Kunlavut Vitidsarn	(Indonesia) Jonatan Christie
20 January	Indonesia Masters (Draw): Dates: 21 January – 26 January; Host: Jakarta, Indonesia; Venue: Istora Gelora Bung Karno; Level: Super 500; Prize: $475,000; Format: 32MS/32WS/32MD/32WD/32XD	Score: 18–21, 21–17, 21–18	
20 January	Indonesia Masters (Draw): Dates: 21 January – 26 January; Host: Jakarta, Indonesia; Venue: Istora Gelora Bung Karno; Level: Super 500; Prize: $475,000; Format: 32MS/32WS/32MD/32WD/32XD	(Thailand) Ratchanok Intanon	(South Korea) Sim Yu-jin
20 January	Indonesia Masters (Draw): Dates: 21 January – 26 January; Host: Jakarta, Indonesia; Venue: Istora Gelora Bung Karno; Level: Super 500; Prize: $475,000; Format: 32MS/32WS/32MD/32WD/32XD	Score: 21–18, 21–17	
20 January	Indonesia Masters (Draw): Dates: 21 January – 26 January; Host: Jakarta, Indonesia; Venue: Istora Gelora Bung Karno; Level: Super 500; Prize: $475,000; Format: 32MS/32WS/32MD/32WD/32XD	(Malaysia) Man Wei Chong (Malaysia) Tee Kai Wun	(Indonesia) Fajar Alfian (Indonesia) Muhammad Rian Ardianto
20 January	Indonesia Masters (Draw): Dates: 21 January – 26 January; Host: Jakarta, Indonesia; Venue: Istora Gelora Bung Karno; Level: Super 500; Prize: $475,000; Format: 32MS/32WS/32MD/32WD/32XD	Score: 21–11, 21–19	
20 January	Indonesia Masters (Draw): Dates: 21 January – 26 January; Host: Jakarta, Indonesia; Venue: Istora Gelora Bung Karno; Level: Super 500; Prize: $475,000; Format: 32MS/32WS/32MD/32WD/32XD	(South Korea) Kim Hye-jeong (South Korea) Kong Hee-yong	(Malaysia) Pearly Tan (Malaysia) Thinaah Muralitharan
20 January	Indonesia Masters (Draw): Dates: 21 January – 26 January; Host: Jakarta, Indonesia; Venue: Istora Gelora Bung Karno; Level: Super 500; Prize: $475,000; Format: 32MS/32WS/32MD/32WD/32XD	Score: 21–12, 17–21, 21–18	
20 January	Indonesia Masters (Draw): Dates: 21 January – 26 January; Host: Jakarta, Indonesia; Venue: Istora Gelora Bung Karno; Level: Super 500; Prize: $475,000; Format: 32MS/32WS/32MD/32WD/32XD	(Japan) Hiroki Midorikawa (Japan) Natsu Saito	(China) Guo Xinwa (China) Chen Fanghui
20 January	Indonesia Masters (Draw): Dates: 21 January – 26 January; Host: Jakarta, Indonesia; Venue: Istora Gelora Bung Karno; Level: Super 500; Prize: $475,000; Format: 32MS/32WS/32MD/32WD/32XD	Score: 21–15, 21–17	
20 January	Iceland International: Dates: 23 January – 26 January; Host: Reykjavík, Iceland; Venue: Tennis- og Badmintonfélag Reykjavíkur; Level: Future Series; Format: 32MS/32WS/32MD/32WD/32XD	(Denmark) Karan Rajan Rajarajan	(Denmark) Mathias Solgaard
20 January	Iceland International: Dates: 23 January – 26 January; Host: Reykjavík, Iceland; Venue: Tennis- og Badmintonfélag Reykjavíkur; Level: Future Series; Format: 32MS/32WS/32MD/32WD/32XD	Score: 21–16, 21–9	
20 January	Iceland International: Dates: 23 January – 26 January; Host: Reykjavík, Iceland; Venue: Tennis- og Badmintonfélag Reykjavíkur; Level: Future Series; Format: 32MS/32WS/32MD/32WD/32XD	(Scotland) Rachel Sugden	(Switzerland) Julie Franconville
20 January	Iceland International: Dates: 23 January – 26 January; Host: Reykjavík, Iceland; Venue: Tennis- og Badmintonfélag Reykjavíkur; Level: Future Series; Format: 32MS/32WS/32MD/32WD/32XD	Score: 21–18, 21–17	
20 January	Iceland International: Dates: 23 January – 26 January; Host: Reykjavík, Iceland; Venue: Tennis- og Badmintonfélag Reykjavíkur; Level: Future Series; Format: 32MS/32WS/32MD/32WD/32XD	(Netherlands) Andy Buijk (France) Aymeric Tores	(Netherlands) Noah Haase (Netherlands) Joep Strooper
20 January	Iceland International: Dates: 23 January – 26 January; Host: Reykjavík, Iceland; Venue: Tennis- og Badmintonfélag Reykjavíkur; Level: Future Series; Format: 32MS/32WS/32MD/32WD/32XD	Score: 21–12, 21–12	
20 January	Iceland International: Dates: 23 January – 26 January; Host: Reykjavík, Iceland; Venue: Tennis- og Badmintonfélag Reykjavíkur; Level: Future Series; Format: 32MS/32WS/32MD/32WD/32XD	(Netherlands) Kirsten de Wit (Netherlands) Meerte Loos	(Denmark) Sophia Lemming (Denmark) Nicoline Tang
20 January	Iceland International: Dates: 23 January – 26 January; Host: Reykjavík, Iceland; Venue: Tennis- og Badmintonfélag Reykjavíkur; Level: Future Series; Format: 32MS/32WS/32MD/32WD/32XD	Score: 21–19, 21–12	
20 January	Iceland International: Dates: 23 January – 26 January; Host: Reykjavík, Iceland; Venue: Tennis- og Badmintonfélag Reykjavíkur; Level: Future Series; Format: 32MS/32WS/32MD/32WD/32XD	(Denmark) Mikkel Klinggaard (Denmark) Nicoline Tang	(France) Aymeric Tores (Netherlands) Kirsten de Wit
20 January	Iceland International: Dates: 23 January – 26 January; Host: Reykjavík, Iceland; Venue: Tennis- og Badmintonfélag Reykjavíkur; Level: Future Series; Format: 32MS/32WS/32MD/32WD/32XD	Score: 21–19, 21–13	
27 January	Thailand Masters (Draw): Dates: 28 January – 2 February; Host: Bangkok, Thailand; Venue: Nimibutr Stadium; Level: Super 300; Prize: $240,000; Format: 32MS/32WS/32MD/32WD/32XD	(Singapore) Jason Teh	(China) Wang Zhengxing
27 January	Thailand Masters (Draw): Dates: 28 January – 2 February; Host: Bangkok, Thailand; Venue: Nimibutr Stadium; Level: Super 300; Prize: $240,000; Format: 32MS/32WS/32MD/32WD/32XD	Score: 21–18, 15–21, 21–19	
27 January	Thailand Masters (Draw): Dates: 28 January – 2 February; Host: Bangkok, Thailand; Venue: Nimibutr Stadium; Level: Super 300; Prize: $240,000; Format: 32MS/32WS/32MD/32WD/32XD	(Thailand) Pornpawee Chochuwong	(Indonesia) Komang Ayu Cahya Dewi
27 January	Thailand Masters (Draw): Dates: 28 January – 2 February; Host: Bangkok, Thailand; Venue: Nimibutr Stadium; Level: Super 300; Prize: $240,000; Format: 32MS/32WS/32MD/32WD/32XD	Score: 18–21, 21–16, 21–13	
27 January	Thailand Masters (Draw): Dates: 28 January – 2 February; Host: Bangkok, Thailand; Venue: Nimibutr Stadium; Level: Super 300; Prize: $240,000; Format: 32MS/32WS/32MD/32WD/32XD	(South Korea) Jin Yong (South Korea) Seo Seung-jae	(Indonesia) Muhammad Shohibul Fikri (Indonesia) Daniel Marthin
27 January	Thailand Masters (Draw): Dates: 28 January – 2 February; Host: Bangkok, Thailand; Venue: Nimibutr Stadium; Level: Super 300; Prize: $240,000; Format: 32MS/32WS/32MD/32WD/32XD	Score: 21–18, 21–17	
27 January	Thailand Masters (Draw): Dates: 28 January – 2 February; Host: Bangkok, Thailand; Venue: Nimibutr Stadium; Level: Super 300; Prize: $240,000; Format: 32MS/32WS/32MD/32WD/32XD	(Indonesia) Lanny Tria Mayasari (Indonesia) Siti Fadia Silva Ramadhanti	(Thailand) Laksika Kanlaha (Thailand) Phataimas Muenwong
27 January	Thailand Masters (Draw): Dates: 28 January – 2 February; Host: Bangkok, Thailand; Venue: Nimibutr Stadium; Level: Super 300; Prize: $240,000; Format: 32MS/32WS/32MD/32WD/32XD	Score: 15–21, 21–13, 21–8	
27 January	Thailand Masters (Draw): Dates: 28 January – 2 February; Host: Bangkok, Thailand; Venue: Nimibutr Stadium; Level: Super 300; Prize: $240,000; Format: 32MS/32WS/32MD/32WD/32XD	(Thailand) Dechapol Puavaranukroh (Thailand) Supissara Paewsampran	(Indonesia) Dejan Ferdinansyah (Indonesia) Siti Fadia Silva Ramadhanti
27 January	Thailand Masters (Draw): Dates: 28 January – 2 February; Host: Bangkok, Thailand; Venue: Nimibutr Stadium; Level: Super 300; Prize: $240,000; Format: 32MS/32WS/32MD/32WD/32XD	Score: 19–21, 21–17, 21–13	
27 January	Iran Fajr International: Dates: 28 January – 2 February; Host: Semnan, Iran; Venue: Alghadir Sports Hall; Level: International Challenge; Prize: $17,500; Format: 64MS/64WS/32MD/32WD/16XD	(India) Manraj Singh	(India) Tarun Reddy Katam
27 January	Iran Fajr International: Dates: 28 January – 2 February; Host: Semnan, Iran; Venue: Alghadir Sports Hall; Level: International Challenge; Prize: $17,500; Format: 64MS/64WS/32MD/32WD/16XD	Score: 21–19, 21–10	
27 January	Iran Fajr International: Dates: 28 January – 2 February; Host: Semnan, Iran; Venue: Alghadir Sports Hall; Level: International Challenge; Prize: $17,500; Format: 64MS/64WS/32MD/32WD/16XD	(Turkey) Neslihan Arın	(Azerbaijan) Keisha Fatimah Azzahra
27 January	Iran Fajr International: Dates: 28 January – 2 February; Host: Semnan, Iran; Venue: Alghadir Sports Hall; Level: International Challenge; Prize: $17,500; Format: 64MS/64WS/32MD/32WD/16XD	Score: 21–17, 21–14	
27 January	Iran Fajr International: Dates: 28 January – 2 February; Host: Semnan, Iran; Venue: Alghadir Sports Hall; Level: International Challenge; Prize: $17,500; Format: 64MS/64WS/32MD/32WD/16XD	(India) Arjun M. R. (India) Vishnuvardhan Panjala	(United Arab Emirates) Dev Ayyappan (United Arab Emirates) Dhiren Ayyappan
27 January	Iran Fajr International: Dates: 28 January – 2 February; Host: Semnan, Iran; Venue: Alghadir Sports Hall; Level: International Challenge; Prize: $17,500; Format: 64MS/64WS/32MD/32WD/16XD	Score: 21–16, 21–17	
27 January	Iran Fajr International: Dates: 28 January – 2 February; Host: Semnan, Iran; Venue: Alghadir Sports Hall; Level: International Challenge; Prize: $17,500; Format: 64MS/64WS/32MD/32WD/16XD	(Bulgaria) Gabriela Stoeva (Bulgaria) Stefani Stoeva	(Turkey) Bengisu Erçetin (Turkey) Nazlıcan İnci
27 January	Iran Fajr International: Dates: 28 January – 2 February; Host: Semnan, Iran; Venue: Alghadir Sports Hall; Level: International Challenge; Prize: $17,500; Format: 64MS/64WS/32MD/32WD/16XD	Score: 23–21, 21–16	
27 January	Iran Fajr International: Dates: 28 January – 2 February; Host: Semnan, Iran; Venue: Alghadir Sports Hall; Level: International Challenge; Prize: $17,500; Format: 64MS/64WS/32MD/32WD/16XD	(India) Ishaan Bhatnagar (India) Srinidhi Narayanan	(Turkey) Emre Sönmez (Turkey) Yasemen Bektaş
27 January	Iran Fajr International: Dates: 28 January – 2 February; Host: Semnan, Iran; Venue: Alghadir Sports Hall; Level: International Challenge; Prize: $17,500; Format: 64MS/64WS/32MD/32WD/16XD	Score: 16–21, 21–17, 21–14	

=== February ===
Week commencing	Tournament	Champions	Runners-up
10 February
10 February	Oceania Mixed Team Badminton Championships (Draw): Dates: 10 February – 12 February; Host: Auckland, New Zealand; Venue: Badminton North Harbour Centre; Level: Continental Team Championships; Format: 5 teams (Round robin)	Australia	New Zealand
10 February	Oceania Mixed Team Badminton Championships (Draw): Dates: 10 February – 12 February; Host: Auckland, New Zealand; Venue: Badminton North Harbour Centre; Level: Continental Team Championships; Format: 5 teams (Round robin)	Kaitlyn Ea; Tiffany Ho; Gronya Somerville; Huaidong Tang; Ricky Tang; Kai Qi Teoh; Angela Yu; Jack Yu; Frederick Zhao	Chris Benzie; Raphael Deloy; Adam Jeffrey; Edward Lau; Shaunna Li; Yanxi Liu; Dylan Soedjasa; Josephine Zhao; Camellia Zhou; Jenny Zhu
10 February	Oceania Mixed Team Badminton Championships (Draw): Dates: 10 February – 12 February; Host: Auckland, New Zealand; Venue: Badminton North Harbour Centre; Level: Continental Team Championships; Format: 5 teams (Round robin)	Score: Round robin	
10 February	All Africa Mixed Team Badminton Championships (Draw): Dates: 10 February – 13 February; Host: Douala, Cameroon; Venue: Japoma Stadium; Level: Continental Team Championships; Format: 11 teams	Algeria	Mauritius
10 February	All Africa Mixed Team Badminton Championships (Draw): Dates: 10 February – 13 February; Host: Douala, Cameroon; Venue: Japoma Stadium; Level: Continental Team Championships; Format: 11 teams	Koceila Mammeri; Linda Mazri	Lucas Douce; Chiara How Hong
10 February	All Africa Mixed Team Badminton Championships (Draw): Dates: 10 February – 13 February; Host: Douala, Cameroon; Venue: Japoma Stadium; Level: Continental Team Championships; Format: 11 teams	Adel Hamek	Julien Paul
10 February	All Africa Mixed Team Badminton Championships (Draw): Dates: 10 February – 13 February; Host: Douala, Cameroon; Venue: Japoma Stadium; Level: Continental Team Championships; Format: 11 teams	Halla Bouksani	Elsa How Hong
10 February	All Africa Mixed Team Badminton Championships (Draw): Dates: 10 February – 13 February; Host: Douala, Cameroon; Venue: Japoma Stadium; Level: Continental Team Championships; Format: 11 teams	Koceila Mammeri; Youcef Sabri Medel	Jean Bongout; Julien Paul
10 February	All Africa Mixed Team Badminton Championships (Draw): Dates: 10 February – 13 February; Host: Douala, Cameroon; Venue: Japoma Stadium; Level: Continental Team Championships; Format: 11 teams	Yasmina Chibah; Linda Mazri	Chiara How Hong; Elsa How Hong
10 February	All Africa Mixed Team Badminton Championships (Draw): Dates: 10 February – 13 February; Host: Douala, Cameroon; Venue: Japoma Stadium; Level: Continental Team Championships; Format: 11 teams	Score: 3–1	
10 February	Badminton Asia Mixed Team Championships (Draw): Dates: 11 February – 16 February; Host: Qingdao, Shandong Province, China; Venue: Conson Gymnasium; Level: Continental Team Championships; Format: 12 teams	Indonesia	China
10 February	Badminton Asia Mixed Team Championships (Draw): Dates: 11 February – 16 February; Host: Qingdao, Shandong Province, China; Venue: Conson Gymnasium; Level: Continental Team Championships; Format: 12 teams	Rinov Rivaldy; Siti Fadia Silva Ramadhanti	Gao Jiaxuan; Wu Mengying
10 February	Badminton Asia Mixed Team Championships (Draw): Dates: 11 February – 16 February; Host: Qingdao, Shandong Province, China; Venue: Conson Gymnasium; Level: Continental Team Championships; Format: 12 teams	Alwi Farhan	Hu Zhe'an
10 February	Badminton Asia Mixed Team Championships (Draw): Dates: 11 February – 16 February; Host: Qingdao, Shandong Province, China; Venue: Conson Gymnasium; Level: Continental Team Championships; Format: 12 teams	Putri Kusuma Wardani	Xu Wenjing
10 February	Badminton Asia Mixed Team Championships (Draw): Dates: 11 February – 16 February; Host: Qingdao, Shandong Province, China; Venue: Conson Gymnasium; Level: Continental Team Championships; Format: 12 teams	Muhammad Shohibul Fikri; Daniel Marthin	Chen Xujun; Huang Di
10 February	Badminton Asia Mixed Team Championships (Draw): Dates: 11 February – 16 February; Host: Qingdao, Shandong Province, China; Venue: Conson Gymnasium; Level: Continental Team Championships; Format: 12 teams	Lanny Tria Mayasari; Siti Fadia Silva Ramadhanti	Chen Qingchen; Keng Shuliang
10 February	Badminton Asia Mixed Team Championships (Draw): Dates: 11 February – 16 February; Host: Qingdao, Shandong Province, China; Venue: Conson Gymnasium; Level: Continental Team Championships; Format: 12 teams	Score: 3–1	
10 February	European Mixed Team Badminton Championships (Draw): Dates: 12 February – 16 February; Host: Baku, Azerbaijan; Venue: Baku Sports Palace; Level: Continental Team Championships; Format: 8 teams	Denmark	France
10 February	European Mixed Team Badminton Championships (Draw): Dates: 12 February – 16 February; Host: Baku, Azerbaijan; Venue: Baku Sports Palace; Level: Continental Team Championships; Format: 8 teams	Jesper Toft; Amalie Magelund	Thom Gicquel; Delphine Delrue
10 February	European Mixed Team Badminton Championships (Draw): Dates: 12 February – 16 February; Host: Baku, Azerbaijan; Venue: Baku Sports Palace; Level: Continental Team Championships; Format: 8 teams	Anders Antonsen	Alex Lanier
10 February	European Mixed Team Badminton Championships (Draw): Dates: 12 February – 16 February; Host: Baku, Azerbaijan; Venue: Baku Sports Palace; Level: Continental Team Championships; Format: 8 teams	Line Christophersen	Léonice Huet
10 February	European Mixed Team Badminton Championships (Draw): Dates: 12 February – 16 February; Host: Baku, Azerbaijan; Venue: Baku Sports Palace; Level: Continental Team Championships; Format: 8 teams	Rasmus Kjær; Frederik Søgaard	Thom Gicquel; Toma Junior Popov
10 February	European Mixed Team Badminton Championships (Draw): Dates: 12 February – 16 February; Host: Baku, Azerbaijan; Venue: Baku Sports Palace; Level: Continental Team Championships; Format: 8 teams	Alexandra Bøje; Maiken Fruergaard	Delphine Delrue; Margot Lambert
10 February	European Mixed Team Badminton Championships (Draw): Dates: 12 February – 16 February; Host: Baku, Azerbaijan; Venue: Baku Sports Palace; Level: Continental Team Championships; Format: 8 teams	Score: 3–0	
10 February	Pan American Cup (Draw): Dates: 13 February – 16 February; Host: Aguascalientes, Mexico; Venue: Gimnasio Olímpico de Aguascalientes; Level: Continental Team Championships; Format: 9 teams	Canada	United States
10 February	Pan American Cup (Draw): Dates: 13 February – 16 February; Host: Aguascalientes, Mexico; Venue: Gimnasio Olímpico de Aguascalientes; Level: Continental Team Championships; Format: 9 teams	Ty Alexander Lindeman; Crystal Lai	Presley Smith; Jennie Gai
10 February	Pan American Cup (Draw): Dates: 13 February – 16 February; Host: Aguascalientes, Mexico; Venue: Gimnasio Olímpico de Aguascalientes; Level: Continental Team Championships; Format: 9 teams	Brian Yang	Enrico Asuncion
10 February	Pan American Cup (Draw): Dates: 13 February – 16 February; Host: Aguascalientes, Mexico; Venue: Gimnasio Olímpico de Aguascalientes; Level: Continental Team Championships; Format: 9 teams	Kevin Lee; Ty Alexander Lindeman	Chen Zhi-yi; Presley Smith
10 February	Pan American Cup (Draw): Dates: 13 February – 16 February; Host: Aguascalientes, Mexico; Venue: Gimnasio Olímpico de Aguascalientes; Level: Continental Team Championships; Format: 9 teams	Michelle Li	Lydia Chao
10 February	Pan American Cup (Draw): Dates: 13 February – 16 February; Host: Aguascalientes, Mexico; Venue: Gimnasio Olímpico de Aguascalientes; Level: Continental Team Championships; Format: 9 teams	Jackie Dent; Crystal Lai	Lauren Lam; Allison Lee
10 February	Pan American Cup (Draw): Dates: 13 February – 16 February; Host: Aguascalientes, Mexico; Venue: Gimnasio Olímpico de Aguascalientes; Level: Continental Team Championships; Format: 9 teams	Score: 3–1	
10 February	Oceania Championships (Draw): Dates: 13 February – 16 February; Host: Auckland, New Zealand; Venue: Badminton North Harbour Centre; Level: Continental Individual Championships; Prize: $5,000; Format: 128MS/64WS/64MD/32WD/64XD	(Australia) Jack Yu	(New Zealand) Edward Lau
10 February	Oceania Championships (Draw): Dates: 13 February – 16 February; Host: Auckland, New Zealand; Venue: Badminton North Harbour Centre; Level: Continental Individual Championships; Prize: $5,000; Format: 128MS/64WS/64MD/32WD/64XD	Score: Walkover	
10 February	Oceania Championships (Draw): Dates: 13 February – 16 February; Host: Auckland, New Zealand; Venue: Badminton North Harbour Centre; Level: Continental Individual Championships; Prize: $5,000; Format: 128MS/64WS/64MD/32WD/64XD	(New Zealand) Shaunna Li	(Australia) Tiffany Ho
10 February	Oceania Championships (Draw): Dates: 13 February – 16 February; Host: Auckland, New Zealand; Venue: Badminton North Harbour Centre; Level: Continental Individual Championships; Prize: $5,000; Format: 128MS/64WS/64MD/32WD/64XD	Score: 23–25, 21–10, 21–18	
10 February	Oceania Championships (Draw): Dates: 13 February – 16 February; Host: Auckland, New Zealand; Venue: Badminton North Harbour Centre; Level: Continental Individual Championships; Prize: $5,000; Format: 128MS/64WS/64MD/32WD/64XD	(New Zealand) Adam Jeffrey (New Zealand) Dylan Soedjasa	(Australia) Huaidong Tang (Australia) Frederick Zhao
10 February	Oceania Championships (Draw): Dates: 13 February – 16 February; Host: Auckland, New Zealand; Venue: Badminton North Harbour Centre; Level: Continental Individual Championships; Prize: $5,000; Format: 128MS/64WS/64MD/32WD/64XD	Score: 21–13, 21–10	
10 February	Oceania Championships (Draw): Dates: 13 February – 16 February; Host: Auckland, New Zealand; Venue: Badminton North Harbour Centre; Level: Continental Individual Championships; Prize: $5,000; Format: 128MS/64WS/64MD/32WD/64XD	(Australia) Gronya Somerville (Australia) Angela Yu	(Australia) Mimi Ngo (Australia) Maureen Clarissa Wijayaa
10 February	Oceania Championships (Draw): Dates: 13 February – 16 February; Host: Auckland, New Zealand; Venue: Badminton North Harbour Centre; Level: Continental Individual Championships; Prize: $5,000; Format: 128MS/64WS/64MD/32WD/64XD	Score: 21–10, 21–12	
10 February	Oceania Championships (Draw): Dates: 13 February – 16 February; Host: Auckland, New Zealand; Venue: Badminton North Harbour Centre; Level: Continental Individual Championships; Prize: $5,000; Format: 128MS/64WS/64MD/32WD/64XD	(New Zealand) Vincent Tao (Australia) Gronya Somerville	(New Zealand) Edward Lau (New Zealand) Shaunna Li
10 February	Oceania Championships (Draw): Dates: 13 February – 16 February; Host: Auckland, New Zealand; Venue: Badminton North Harbour Centre; Level: Continental Individual Championships; Prize: $5,000; Format: 128MS/64WS/64MD/32WD/64XD	Score: 21–19, 14–21, 21–18	
10 February	All Africa Individual Championships (Draw): Dates: 14 February – 16 February; Host: Douala, Cameroon; Venue: Japoma Stadium; Level: Continental Individual Championships; Format: 64MS/64WS/32MD/16WD/32XD	(Nigeria) Anuoluwapo Juwon Opeyori	(Egypt) Adham Hatem Elgamal
10 February	All Africa Individual Championships (Draw): Dates: 14 February – 16 February; Host: Douala, Cameroon; Venue: Japoma Stadium; Level: Continental Individual Championships; Format: 64MS/64WS/32MD/16WD/32XD	Score: 21–7, 23–21	
10 February	All Africa Individual Championships (Draw): Dates: 14 February – 16 February; Host: Douala, Cameroon; Venue: Japoma Stadium; Level: Continental Individual Championships; Format: 64MS/64WS/32MD/16WD/32XD	(Egypt) Nour Ahmed Youssri	(Egypt) Doha Hany
10 February	All Africa Individual Championships (Draw): Dates: 14 February – 16 February; Host: Douala, Cameroon; Venue: Japoma Stadium; Level: Continental Individual Championships; Format: 64MS/64WS/32MD/16WD/32XD	Score: 21–7, 21–14	
10 February	All Africa Individual Championships (Draw): Dates: 14 February – 16 February; Host: Douala, Cameroon; Venue: Japoma Stadium; Level: Continental Individual Championships; Format: 64MS/64WS/32MD/16WD/32XD	(Algeria) Koceila Mammeri (Algeria) Youcef Sabri Medel	(Mauritius) Jean Bongout (Mauritius) Julien Paul
10 February	All Africa Individual Championships (Draw): Dates: 14 February – 16 February; Host: Douala, Cameroon; Venue: Japoma Stadium; Level: Continental Individual Championships; Format: 64MS/64WS/32MD/16WD/32XD	Score: 21–19, 21–9	
10 February	All Africa Individual Championships (Draw): Dates: 14 February – 16 February; Host: Douala, Cameroon; Venue: Japoma Stadium; Level: Continental Individual Championships; Format: 64MS/64WS/32MD/16WD/32XD	(South Africa) Amy Ackerman (South Africa) Johanita Scholtz	(Algeria) Yasmina Chibah (Algeria) Linda Mazri
10 February	All Africa Individual Championships (Draw): Dates: 14 February – 16 February; Host: Douala, Cameroon; Venue: Japoma Stadium; Level: Continental Individual Championships; Format: 64MS/64WS/32MD/16WD/32XD	Score: 24–22, 21–10	
10 February	All Africa Individual Championships (Draw): Dates: 14 February – 16 February; Host: Douala, Cameroon; Venue: Japoma Stadium; Level: Continental Individual Championships; Format: 64MS/64WS/32MD/16WD/32XD	(Algeria) Koceila Mammeri (Algeria) Tanina Mammeri	(Egypt) Adham Hatem Elgamal (Egypt) Doha Hany
10 February	All Africa Individual Championships (Draw): Dates: 14 February – 16 February; Host: Douala, Cameroon; Venue: Japoma Stadium; Level: Continental Individual Championships; Format: 64MS/64WS/32MD/16WD/32XD	Score: Walkover	
17 February	Singapore International: Dates: 18 February – 23 February; Host: Singapore; Venue: Singapore Badminton Hall East Coast @ EXPO; Level: International Challenge; Prize: $25,000; Format: 64MS/32WS/32MD/32WD/32XD	(Indonesia) Zaki Ubaidillah	(Indonesia) Prahdiska Bagas Shujiwo
17 February	Singapore International: Dates: 18 February – 23 February; Host: Singapore; Venue: Singapore Badminton Hall East Coast @ EXPO; Level: International Challenge; Prize: $25,000; Format: 64MS/32WS/32MD/32WD/32XD	Score: 21–15, 21–17	
17 February	Singapore International: Dates: 18 February – 23 February; Host: Singapore; Venue: Singapore Badminton Hall East Coast @ EXPO; Level: International Challenge; Prize: $25,000; Format: 64MS/32WS/32MD/32WD/32XD	(Indonesia) Ruzana	(India) Unnati Hooda
17 February	Singapore International: Dates: 18 February – 23 February; Host: Singapore; Venue: Singapore Badminton Hall East Coast @ EXPO; Level: International Challenge; Prize: $25,000; Format: 64MS/32WS/32MD/32WD/32XD	Score: 21–17, 21–16	
17 February	Singapore International: Dates: 18 February – 23 February; Host: Singapore; Venue: Singapore Badminton Hall East Coast @ EXPO; Level: International Challenge; Prize: $25,000; Format: 64MS/32WS/32MD/32WD/32XD	(Indonesia) Raymond Indra (Indonesia) Nikolaus Joaquin	(Singapore) Wesley Koh (Singapore) Junsuke Kubo
17 February	Singapore International: Dates: 18 February – 23 February; Host: Singapore; Venue: Singapore Badminton Hall East Coast @ EXPO; Level: International Challenge; Prize: $25,000; Format: 64MS/32WS/32MD/32WD/32XD	Score: 21–18, 18–21, 22–20	
17 February	Singapore International: Dates: 18 February – 23 February; Host: Singapore; Venue: Singapore Badminton Hall East Coast @ EXPO; Level: International Challenge; Prize: $25,000; Format: 64MS/32WS/32MD/32WD/32XD	(South Korea) Jang Eun-seo (South Korea) Lee Seo-jin	(Indonesia) Siti Sarah Azzahra (Indonesia) Agnia Sri Rahayu
17 February	Singapore International: Dates: 18 February – 23 February; Host: Singapore; Venue: Singapore Badminton Hall East Coast @ EXPO; Level: International Challenge; Prize: $25,000; Format: 64MS/32WS/32MD/32WD/32XD	Score: 21–17, 15–21, 21–14	
17 February	Singapore International: Dates: 18 February – 23 February; Host: Singapore; Venue: Singapore Badminton Hall East Coast @ EXPO; Level: International Challenge; Prize: $25,000; Format: 64MS/32WS/32MD/32WD/32XD	(Indonesia) Bobby Setiabudi (Indonesia) Melati Daeva Oktavianti	(Thailand) Phuwanat Horbanluekit (Thailand) Fungfa Korpthammakit
17 February	Singapore International: Dates: 18 February – 23 February; Host: Singapore; Venue: Singapore Badminton Hall East Coast @ EXPO; Level: International Challenge; Prize: $25,000; Format: 64MS/32WS/32MD/32WD/32XD	Score: 21–19, 21–16	
17 February	Uganda International: Dates: 19 February – 23 February; Host: Kampala, Uganda; Venue: Lugogo Stadium; Level: International Challenge; Prize: $17,500; Format: 32MS/32WS/32MD/32WD/32XD	(India) Manraj Singh	(Azerbaijan) Dicky Dwi Pangestu
17 February	Uganda International: Dates: 19 February – 23 February; Host: Kampala, Uganda; Venue: Lugogo Stadium; Level: International Challenge; Prize: $17,500; Format: 32MS/32WS/32MD/32WD/32XD	Score: 21–10, 17–21, 21–18	
17 February	Uganda International: Dates: 19 February – 23 February; Host: Kampala, Uganda; Venue: Lugogo Stadium; Level: International Challenge; Prize: $17,500; Format: 32MS/32WS/32MD/32WD/32XD	(United States) Ishika Jaiswal	(Turkey) Neslihan Arın
17 February	Uganda International: Dates: 19 February – 23 February; Host: Kampala, Uganda; Venue: Lugogo Stadium; Level: International Challenge; Prize: $17,500; Format: 32MS/32WS/32MD/32WD/32XD	Score: 21–15, 19–21, 22–20	
17 February	Uganda International: Dates: 19 February – 23 February; Host: Kampala, Uganda; Venue: Lugogo Stadium; Level: International Challenge; Prize: $17,500; Format: 32MS/32WS/32MD/32WD/32XD	(India) Mohammad Amaan (India) Dingku Konthoujam	(India) Akshan Shetty (India) Sankar Prasad Udayakumar
17 February	Uganda International: Dates: 19 February – 23 February; Host: Kampala, Uganda; Venue: Lugogo Stadium; Level: International Challenge; Prize: $17,500; Format: 32MS/32WS/32MD/32WD/32XD	Score: 14–21, 21–15, 21–17	
17 February	Uganda International: Dates: 19 February – 23 February; Host: Kampala, Uganda; Venue: Lugogo Stadium; Level: International Challenge; Prize: $17,500; Format: 32MS/32WS/32MD/32WD/32XD	(United States) Lauren Lam (United States) Allison Lee	(Switzerland) Lucie Amiguet (Switzerland) Caroline Racloz
17 February	Uganda International: Dates: 19 February – 23 February; Host: Kampala, Uganda; Venue: Lugogo Stadium; Level: International Challenge; Prize: $17,500; Format: 32MS/32WS/32MD/32WD/32XD	Score: 21–10, 21–13	
17 February	Uganda International: Dates: 19 February – 23 February; Host: Kampala, Uganda; Venue: Lugogo Stadium; Level: International Challenge; Prize: $17,500; Format: 32MS/32WS/32MD/32WD/32XD	(India) Ishaan Bhatnagar (India) Srinidhi Narayanan	(India) Dhruv Rawat (India) K. Maneesha
17 February	Uganda International: Dates: 19 February – 23 February; Host: Kampala, Uganda; Venue: Lugogo Stadium; Level: International Challenge; Prize: $17,500; Format: 32MS/32WS/32MD/32WD/32XD	Score: 21–18, 9–3 retired	
24 February	German Open (Draw): Dates: 25 February – 2 March; Host: Mülheim, Germany; Venue: Westenergie Sporthalle; Level: Super 300; Prize: $240,000; Format: 32MS/32WS/32MD/32WD/32XD	(Denmark) Viktor Axelsen	(Singapore) Loh Kean Yew
24 February	German Open (Draw): Dates: 25 February – 2 March; Host: Mülheim, Germany; Venue: Westenergie Sporthalle; Level: Super 300; Prize: $240,000; Format: 32MS/32WS/32MD/32WD/32XD	Score: 21–19, 21–18	
24 February	German Open (Draw): Dates: 25 February – 2 March; Host: Mülheim, Germany; Venue: Westenergie Sporthalle; Level: Super 300; Prize: $240,000; Format: 32MS/32WS/32MD/32WD/32XD	(Singapore) Yeo Jia Min	(Vietnam) Nguyễn Thùy Linh
24 February	German Open (Draw): Dates: 25 February – 2 March; Host: Mülheim, Germany; Venue: Westenergie Sporthalle; Level: Super 300; Prize: $240,000; Format: 32MS/32WS/32MD/32WD/32XD	Score: 21–16, 21–17	
24 February	German Open (Draw): Dates: 25 February – 2 March; Host: Mülheim, Germany; Venue: Westenergie Sporthalle; Level: Super 300; Prize: $240,000; Format: 32MS/32WS/32MD/32WD/32XD	(South Korea) Kim Won-ho (South Korea) Seo Seung-jae	(France) Christo Popov (France) Toma Junior Popov
24 February	German Open (Draw): Dates: 25 February – 2 March; Host: Mülheim, Germany; Venue: Westenergie Sporthalle; Level: Super 300; Prize: $240,000; Format: 32MS/32WS/32MD/32WD/32XD	Score: 21–19, 21–17	
24 February	German Open (Draw): Dates: 25 February – 2 March; Host: Mülheim, Germany; Venue: Westenergie Sporthalle; Level: Super 300; Prize: $240,000; Format: 32MS/32WS/32MD/32WD/32XD	(Japan) Mizuki Otake (Japan) Miyu Takahashi	(Bulgaria) Gabriela Stoeva (Bulgaria) Stefani Stoeva
24 February	German Open (Draw): Dates: 25 February – 2 March; Host: Mülheim, Germany; Venue: Westenergie Sporthalle; Level: Super 300; Prize: $240,000; Format: 32MS/32WS/32MD/32WD/32XD	Score: 21–17, 20–22, 21–12	
24 February	German Open (Draw): Dates: 25 February – 2 March; Host: Mülheim, Germany; Venue: Westenergie Sporthalle; Level: Super 300; Prize: $240,000; Format: 32MS/32WS/32MD/32WD/32XD	(Netherlands) Robin Tabeling (Denmark) Alexandra Bøje	(Indonesia) Rehan Naufal Kusharjanto (Indonesia) Gloria Emanuelle Widjaja
24 February	German Open (Draw): Dates: 25 February – 2 March; Host: Mülheim, Germany; Venue: Westenergie Sporthalle; Level: Super 300; Prize: $240,000; Format: 32MS/32WS/32MD/32WD/32XD	Score: 21–17, 21–12	
24 February	Sri Lanka International: Dates: 25 February – 2 March; Host: Colombo, Sri Lanka; Venue: St. Joseph's College; Level: International Challenge; Prize: $17,500; Format: 64MS/32WS/32MD/32WD/32XD	(Malaysia) Aidil Sholeh	(India) Pranay Katta
24 February	Sri Lanka International: Dates: 25 February – 2 March; Host: Colombo, Sri Lanka; Venue: St. Joseph's College; Level: International Challenge; Prize: $17,500; Format: 64MS/32WS/32MD/32WD/32XD	Score: 21–19, 21–15	
24 February	Sri Lanka International: Dates: 25 February – 2 March; Host: Colombo, Sri Lanka; Venue: St. Joseph's College; Level: International Challenge; Prize: $17,500; Format: 64MS/32WS/32MD/32WD/32XD	(Japan) Manami Suizu	(India) Adita Rao
24 February	Sri Lanka International: Dates: 25 February – 2 March; Host: Colombo, Sri Lanka; Venue: St. Joseph's College; Level: International Challenge; Prize: $17,500; Format: 64MS/32WS/32MD/32WD/32XD	Score: 21–12, 27–25	
24 February	Sri Lanka International: Dates: 25 February – 2 March; Host: Colombo, Sri Lanka; Venue: St. Joseph's College; Level: International Challenge; Prize: $17,500; Format: 64MS/32WS/32MD/32WD/32XD	(Indonesia) Raymond Indra (Indonesia) Nikolaus Joaquin	(Chinese Taipei) Lin Chia-yen (Chinese Taipei) Lin Yong-sheng
24 February	Sri Lanka International: Dates: 25 February – 2 March; Host: Colombo, Sri Lanka; Venue: St. Joseph's College; Level: International Challenge; Prize: $17,500; Format: 64MS/32WS/32MD/32WD/32XD	Score: 21–14, 21–12	
24 February	Sri Lanka International: Dates: 25 February – 2 March; Host: Colombo, Sri Lanka; Venue: St. Joseph's College; Level: International Challenge; Prize: $17,500; Format: 64MS/32WS/32MD/32WD/32XD	(Japan) Hina Osawa (Japan) Akari Sato	(Thailand) Tidapron Kleebyeesun (Thailand) Nattamon Laisuan
24 February	Sri Lanka International: Dates: 25 February – 2 March; Host: Colombo, Sri Lanka; Venue: St. Joseph's College; Level: International Challenge; Prize: $17,500; Format: 64MS/32WS/32MD/32WD/32XD	Score: 22–20, 15–21, 21–15	
24 February	Sri Lanka International: Dates: 25 February – 2 March; Host: Colombo, Sri Lanka; Venue: St. Joseph's College; Level: International Challenge; Prize: $17,500; Format: 64MS/32WS/32MD/32WD/32XD	(Indonesia) Bobby Setiabudi (Indonesia) Melati Daeva Oktavianti	(Japan) Yuta Watanabe (Japan) Maya Taguchi
24 February	Sri Lanka International: Dates: 25 February – 2 March; Host: Colombo, Sri Lanka; Venue: St. Joseph's College; Level: International Challenge; Prize: $17,500; Format: 64MS/32WS/32MD/32WD/32XD	Score: 16–21, 21–14, 21–18	

=== March ===
Week commencing	Tournament	Champions	Runners-up
3 March	Orléans Masters (Draw): Dates: 4 March – 10 March; Host: Orléans, France; Venue: Palais des Sports; Level: Super 300; Prize: $240,000; Format: 32MS/32WS/32MD/32WD/32XD	(France) Alex Lanier	(Chinese Taipei) Lin Chun-yi
3 March	Orléans Masters (Draw): Dates: 4 March – 10 March; Host: Orléans, France; Venue: Palais des Sports; Level: Super 300; Prize: $240,000; Format: 32MS/32WS/32MD/32WD/32XD	Score: 21–13, 21–18	
3 March	Orléans Masters (Draw): Dates: 4 March – 10 March; Host: Orléans, France; Venue: Palais des Sports; Level: Super 300; Prize: $240,000; Format: 32MS/32WS/32MD/32WD/32XD	(South Korea) An Se-young	(China) Chen Yufei
3 March	Orléans Masters (Draw): Dates: 4 March – 10 March; Host: Orléans, France; Venue: Palais des Sports; Level: Super 300; Prize: $240,000; Format: 32MS/32WS/32MD/32WD/32XD	Score: 21–14, 21–15	
3 March	Orléans Masters (Draw): Dates: 4 March – 10 March; Host: Orléans, France; Venue: Palais des Sports; Level: Super 300; Prize: $240,000; Format: 32MS/32WS/32MD/32WD/32XD	(South Korea) Kang Min-hyuk (South Korea) Ki Dong-ju	(China) Liang Weikeng (China) Wang Chang
3 March	Orléans Masters (Draw): Dates: 4 March – 10 March; Host: Orléans, France; Venue: Palais des Sports; Level: Super 300; Prize: $240,000; Format: 32MS/32WS/32MD/32WD/32XD	Score: 21–13, 18–21, 21–18	
3 March	Orléans Masters (Draw): Dates: 4 March – 10 March; Host: Orléans, France; Venue: Palais des Sports; Level: Super 300; Prize: $240,000; Format: 32MS/32WS/32MD/32WD/32XD	(South Korea) Kim Hye-jeong (South Korea) Kong Hee-yong	(South Korea) Baek Ha-na (South Korea) Lee So-hee
3 March	Orléans Masters (Draw): Dates: 4 March – 10 March; Host: Orléans, France; Venue: Palais des Sports; Level: Super 300; Prize: $240,000; Format: 32MS/32WS/32MD/32WD/32XD	Score: 21–18, 23–21	
3 March	Orléans Masters (Draw): Dates: 4 March – 10 March; Host: Orléans, France; Venue: Palais des Sports; Level: Super 300; Prize: $240,000; Format: 32MS/32WS/32MD/32WD/32XD	(Denmark) Jesper Toft (Denmark) Amalie Magelund	(Indonesia) Rehan Naufal Kusharjanto (Indonesia) Gloria Emanuelle Widjaja
3 March	Orléans Masters (Draw): Dates: 4 March – 10 March; Host: Orléans, France; Venue: Palais des Sports; Level: Super 300; Prize: $240,000; Format: 32MS/32WS/32MD/32WD/32XD	Score: 21–17, 21–13	
3 March	Sri Lanka International: Dates: 3 March – 7 March; Host: Colombo, Sri Lanka; Venue: St. Joseph's College; Level: International Series; Prize: $5,000; Format: 64MS/32WS/32MD/32WD/32XD	(Indonesia) Jelang Fajar	(Sri Lanka) Buwaneka Goonethilleka
3 March	Sri Lanka International: Dates: 3 March – 7 March; Host: Colombo, Sri Lanka; Venue: St. Joseph's College; Level: International Series; Prize: $5,000; Format: 64MS/32WS/32MD/32WD/32XD	Score: 21–18, 21–13	
3 March	Sri Lanka International: Dates: 3 March – 7 March; Host: Colombo, Sri Lanka; Venue: St. Joseph's College; Level: International Series; Prize: $5,000; Format: 64MS/32WS/32MD/32WD/32XD	(Thailand) Tidapron Kleebyeesun	(Thailand) Lalinrat Chaiwan
3 March	Sri Lanka International: Dates: 3 March – 7 March; Host: Colombo, Sri Lanka; Venue: St. Joseph's College; Level: International Series; Prize: $5,000; Format: 64MS/32WS/32MD/32WD/32XD	Score: 13–21, 21–14, 21–14	
3 March	Sri Lanka International: Dates: 3 March – 7 March; Host: Colombo, Sri Lanka; Venue: St. Joseph's College; Level: International Series; Prize: $5,000; Format: 64MS/32WS/32MD/32WD/32XD	(Malaysia) Bryan Goonting (Malaysia) Fazriq Razif	(Malaysia) Goh Boon Zhe (Malaysia) Wong Vin Sean
3 March	Sri Lanka International: Dates: 3 March – 7 March; Host: Colombo, Sri Lanka; Venue: St. Joseph's College; Level: International Series; Prize: $5,000; Format: 64MS/32WS/32MD/32WD/32XD	Score: 17–21, 21–16, 21–18	
3 March	Sri Lanka International: Dates: 3 March – 7 March; Host: Colombo, Sri Lanka; Venue: St. Joseph's College; Level: International Series; Prize: $5,000; Format: 64MS/32WS/32MD/32WD/32XD	(Japan) Hina Osawa (Japan) Akari Sato	(South Korea) Kim Min-ji (South Korea) Kim Yu-jung
3 March	Sri Lanka International: Dates: 3 March – 7 March; Host: Colombo, Sri Lanka; Venue: St. Joseph's College; Level: International Series; Prize: $5,000; Format: 64MS/32WS/32MD/32WD/32XD	Score: 21–19, 17–21, 21–13	
3 March	Sri Lanka International: Dates: 3 March – 7 March; Host: Colombo, Sri Lanka; Venue: St. Joseph's College; Level: International Series; Prize: $5,000; Format: 64MS/32WS/32MD/32WD/32XD	(Japan) Yuta Watanabe (Japan) Maya Taguchi	(Thailand) Ratchapol Makkasasithorn (Thailand) Nattamon Laisuan
3 March	Sri Lanka International: Dates: 3 March – 7 March; Host: Colombo, Sri Lanka; Venue: St. Joseph's College; Level: International Series; Prize: $5,000; Format: 64MS/32WS/32MD/32WD/32XD	Score: 21–15, 21–16	
3 March	Portugal International: Dates: 5 March – 9 March; Host: Caldas da Rainha, Portugal; Venue: Badminton High Performance Sports Centre; Level: International Series; Prize: $10,000; Format: 32MS/32WS/32MD/32WD/32XD	(Israel) Daniil Dubovenko	(South Korea) Yoo Tae-bin
3 March	Portugal International: Dates: 5 March – 9 March; Host: Caldas da Rainha, Portugal; Venue: Badminton High Performance Sports Centre; Level: International Series; Prize: $10,000; Format: 32MS/32WS/32MD/32WD/32XD	Score: 21–14, 11–21, 21–17	
3 March	Portugal International: Dates: 5 March – 9 March; Host: Caldas da Rainha, Portugal; Venue: Badminton High Performance Sports Centre; Level: International Series; Prize: $10,000; Format: 32MS/32WS/32MD/32WD/32XD	(Canada) Rachel Chan	(Estonia) Kristin Kuuba
3 March	Portugal International: Dates: 5 March – 9 March; Host: Caldas da Rainha, Portugal; Venue: Badminton High Performance Sports Centre; Level: International Series; Prize: $10,000; Format: 32MS/32WS/32MD/32WD/32XD	Score: 22–20, 21–9	
3 March	Portugal International: Dates: 5 March – 9 March; Host: Caldas da Rainha, Portugal; Venue: Badminton High Performance Sports Centre; Level: International Series; Prize: $10,000; Format: 32MS/32WS/32MD/32WD/32XD	(Germany) Bjarne Geiss (Germany) Jan Colin Völker	(France) Maël Cattoen (France) Lucas Renoir
3 March	Portugal International: Dates: 5 March – 9 March; Host: Caldas da Rainha, Portugal; Venue: Badminton High Performance Sports Centre; Level: International Series; Prize: $10,000; Format: 32MS/32WS/32MD/32WD/32XD	Score: 21–8, 21–16	
3 March	Portugal International: Dates: 5 March – 9 March; Host: Caldas da Rainha, Portugal; Venue: Badminton High Performance Sports Centre; Level: International Series; Prize: $10,000; Format: 32MS/32WS/32MD/32WD/32XD	(France) Margot Lambert (France) Camille Pognante	(Denmark) Simona Pilgaard (Denmark) Mette Werge
3 March	Portugal International: Dates: 5 March – 9 March; Host: Caldas da Rainha, Portugal; Venue: Badminton High Performance Sports Centre; Level: International Series; Prize: $10,000; Format: 32MS/32WS/32MD/32WD/32XD	Score: Walkover	
3 March	Portugal International: Dates: 5 March – 9 March; Host: Caldas da Rainha, Portugal; Venue: Badminton High Performance Sports Centre; Level: International Series; Prize: $10,000; Format: 32MS/32WS/32MD/32WD/32XD	(France) Grégoire Deschamp (France) Margot Lambert	(France) Natan Begga (France) Téa Margueritte
3 March	Portugal International: Dates: 5 March – 9 March; Host: Caldas da Rainha, Portugal; Venue: Badminton High Performance Sports Centre; Level: International Series; Prize: $10,000; Format: 32MS/32WS/32MD/32WD/32XD	Score: 21–14, 21–14	
10 March	All England Open (Draw): Dates: 11 March – 16 March; Host: Birmingham, England; Venue: Utilita Arena Birmingham; Level: Super 1000; Prize: $1,450,000; Format: 32MS/32WS/32MD/32WD/32XD	(China) Shi Yuqi	(Chinese Taipei) Lee Chia-hao
10 March	All England Open (Draw): Dates: 11 March – 16 March; Host: Birmingham, England; Venue: Utilita Arena Birmingham; Level: Super 1000; Prize: $1,450,000; Format: 32MS/32WS/32MD/32WD/32XD	Score: 21–17, 21–19	
10 March	All England Open (Draw): Dates: 11 March – 16 March; Host: Birmingham, England; Venue: Utilita Arena Birmingham; Level: Super 1000; Prize: $1,450,000; Format: 32MS/32WS/32MD/32WD/32XD	(South Korea) An Se-young	(China) Wang Zhiyi
10 March	All England Open (Draw): Dates: 11 March – 16 March; Host: Birmingham, England; Venue: Utilita Arena Birmingham; Level: Super 1000; Prize: $1,450,000; Format: 32MS/32WS/32MD/32WD/32XD	Score: 13–21, 21–18, 21–18	
10 March	All England Open (Draw): Dates: 11 March – 16 March; Host: Birmingham, England; Venue: Utilita Arena Birmingham; Level: Super 1000; Prize: $1,450,000; Format: 32MS/32WS/32MD/32WD/32XD	(South Korea) Kim Won-ho (South Korea) Seo Seung-jae	(Indonesia) Leo Rolly Carnando (Indonesia) Bagas Maulana
10 March	All England Open (Draw): Dates: 11 March – 16 March; Host: Birmingham, England; Venue: Utilita Arena Birmingham; Level: Super 1000; Prize: $1,450,000; Format: 32MS/32WS/32MD/32WD/32XD	Score: 21–19, 21–19	
10 March	All England Open (Draw): Dates: 11 March – 16 March; Host: Birmingham, England; Venue: Utilita Arena Birmingham; Level: Super 1000; Prize: $1,450,000; Format: 32MS/32WS/32MD/32WD/32XD	(Japan) Nami Matsuyama (Japan) Chiharu Shida	(Japan) Yuki Fukushima (Japan) Mayu Matsumoto
10 March	All England Open (Draw): Dates: 11 March – 16 March; Host: Birmingham, England; Venue: Utilita Arena Birmingham; Level: Super 1000; Prize: $1,450,000; Format: 32MS/32WS/32MD/32WD/32XD	Score: 21–16, 14–21, 21–17	
10 March	All England Open (Draw): Dates: 11 March – 16 March; Host: Birmingham, England; Venue: Utilita Arena Birmingham; Level: Super 1000; Prize: $1,450,000; Format: 32MS/32WS/32MD/32WD/32XD	(China) Guo Xinwa (China) Chen Fanghui	(China) Feng Yanzhe (China) Wei Yaxin
10 March	All England Open (Draw): Dates: 11 March – 16 March; Host: Birmingham, England; Venue: Utilita Arena Birmingham; Level: Super 1000; Prize: $1,450,000; Format: 32MS/32WS/32MD/32WD/32XD	Score: 21–16, 10–21, 23–21	
10 March	Ruichang China Masters (Draw): Dates: 11 March – 16 March; Host: Ruichang, China; Venue: Ruichang Sports Park Gym; Level: Super 100; Prize: $120,000; Format: 48MS/32WS/32MD/32WD/32XD	(China) Sun Chao	(China) Zhou Xinyu
10 March	Ruichang China Masters (Draw): Dates: 11 March – 16 March; Host: Ruichang, China; Venue: Ruichang Sports Park Gym; Level: Super 100; Prize: $120,000; Format: 48MS/32WS/32MD/32WD/32XD	Score: 21–15, 21–17	
10 March	Ruichang China Masters (Draw): Dates: 11 March – 16 March; Host: Ruichang, China; Venue: Ruichang Sports Park Gym; Level: Super 100; Prize: $120,000; Format: 48MS/32WS/32MD/32WD/32XD	(China) Zhang Yiman	(China) Han Qianxi
10 March	Ruichang China Masters (Draw): Dates: 11 March – 16 March; Host: Ruichang, China; Venue: Ruichang Sports Park Gym; Level: Super 100; Prize: $120,000; Format: 48MS/32WS/32MD/32WD/32XD	Score: 21–13, 21–14	
10 March	Ruichang China Masters (Draw): Dates: 11 March – 16 March; Host: Ruichang, China; Venue: Ruichang Sports Park Gym; Level: Super 100; Prize: $120,000; Format: 48MS/32WS/32MD/32WD/32XD	(China) Chen Yongrui (China) Chen Zhehan	(China) Hu Keyuan (China) Lin Xiangyi
10 March	Ruichang China Masters (Draw): Dates: 11 March – 16 March; Host: Ruichang, China; Venue: Ruichang Sports Park Gym; Level: Super 100; Prize: $120,000; Format: 48MS/32WS/32MD/32WD/32XD	Score: 23–21, 21–15	
10 March	Ruichang China Masters (Draw): Dates: 11 March – 16 March; Host: Ruichang, China; Venue: Ruichang Sports Park Gym; Level: Super 100; Prize: $120,000; Format: 48MS/32WS/32MD/32WD/32XD	(China) Chen Xiaofei (China) Feng Xueying	(China) Qiao Shijun (China) Zheng Yu
10 March	Ruichang China Masters (Draw): Dates: 11 March – 16 March; Host: Ruichang, China; Venue: Ruichang Sports Park Gym; Level: Super 100; Prize: $120,000; Format: 48MS/32WS/32MD/32WD/32XD	Score: 21–17, 21–12	
10 March	Ruichang China Masters (Draw): Dates: 11 March – 16 March; Host: Ruichang, China; Venue: Ruichang Sports Park Gym; Level: Super 100; Prize: $120,000; Format: 48MS/32WS/32MD/32WD/32XD	(Hong Kong) Tang Chun Man (Hong Kong) Ng Tsz Yau	(China) Zhang Hanyu (China) Tang Ruizhi
10 March	Ruichang China Masters (Draw): Dates: 11 March – 16 March; Host: Ruichang, China; Venue: Ruichang Sports Park Gym; Level: Super 100; Prize: $120,000; Format: 48MS/32WS/32MD/32WD/32XD	Score: 21–17, 18–21, 21–12	
10 March	Dutch International (cancelled): Dates: 13 March – 16 March; Host: Wateringen, Netherlands; Venue: VELO Hall; Level: International Series; Prize: $10,000; Format: 32MS/32WS/32MD/32WD/32XD		
10 March	Dutch International (cancelled): Dates: 13 March – 16 March; Host: Wateringen, Netherlands; Venue: VELO Hall; Level: International Series; Prize: $10,000; Format: 32MS/32WS/32MD/32WD/32XD	Score:	
10 March	Dutch International (cancelled): Dates: 13 March – 16 March; Host: Wateringen, Netherlands; Venue: VELO Hall; Level: International Series; Prize: $10,000; Format: 32MS/32WS/32MD/32WD/32XD	Score:	
10 March	Dutch International (cancelled): Dates: 13 March – 16 March; Host: Wateringen, Netherlands; Venue: VELO Hall; Level: International Series; Prize: $10,000; Format: 32MS/32WS/32MD/32WD/32XD	Score:	
10 March	Dutch International (cancelled): Dates: 13 March – 16 March; Host: Wateringen, Netherlands; Venue: VELO Hall; Level: International Series; Prize: $10,000; Format: 32MS/32WS/32MD/32WD/32XD	Score:	
10 March	Dutch International (cancelled): Dates: 13 March – 16 March; Host: Wateringen, Netherlands; Venue: VELO Hall; Level: International Series; Prize: $10,000; Format: 32MS/32WS/32MD/32WD/32XD	Score:	
10 March	Giraldilla International: Dates: 12 March – 16 March; Host: Havana, Cuba; Venue: Coliseo de la Ciudad Deportiva; Level: Future Series; Format: 32MS/32WS/16MD/16WD/32XD	(Guatemala) Yeison del Cid	(Guatemala) Kevin Cordón
10 March	Giraldilla International: Dates: 12 March – 16 March; Host: Havana, Cuba; Venue: Coliseo de la Ciudad Deportiva; Level: Future Series; Format: 32MS/32WS/16MD/16WD/32XD	Score: 15–21, 24–22, 21–18	
10 March	Giraldilla International: Dates: 12 March – 16 March; Host: Havana, Cuba; Venue: Coliseo de la Ciudad Deportiva; Level: Future Series; Format: 32MS/32WS/16MD/16WD/32XD	(Italy) Yasmine Hamza	(France) Romane Cloteaux-Foucault
10 March	Giraldilla International: Dates: 12 March – 16 March; Host: Havana, Cuba; Venue: Coliseo de la Ciudad Deportiva; Level: Future Series; Format: 32MS/32WS/16MD/16WD/32XD	Score: 21–18, 21–14	
10 March	Giraldilla International: Dates: 12 March – 16 March; Host: Havana, Cuba; Venue: Coliseo de la Ciudad Deportiva; Level: Future Series; Format: 32MS/32WS/16MD/16WD/32XD	(Guatemala) Christopher Martínez (Guatemala) Jonathan Solís	(Cuba) Juan Bencomo (Cuba) Roberto Herrera
10 March	Giraldilla International: Dates: 12 March – 16 March; Host: Havana, Cuba; Venue: Coliseo de la Ciudad Deportiva; Level: Future Series; Format: 32MS/32WS/16MD/16WD/32XD	Score: 21–4, 21–10	
10 March	Giraldilla International: Dates: 12 March – 16 March; Host: Havana, Cuba; Venue: Coliseo de la Ciudad Deportiva; Level: Future Series; Format: 32MS/32WS/16MD/16WD/32XD	(Cuba) Leyanis Contreras (Cuba) Taymara Oropesa	(Dominican Republic) Alissa Acosta (Dominican Republic) Daniela Acosta
10 March	Giraldilla International: Dates: 12 March – 16 March; Host: Havana, Cuba; Venue: Coliseo de la Ciudad Deportiva; Level: Future Series; Format: 32MS/32WS/16MD/16WD/32XD	Score: 21–11, 21–9	
10 March	Giraldilla International: Dates: 12 March – 16 March; Host: Havana, Cuba; Venue: Coliseo de la Ciudad Deportiva; Level: Future Series; Format: 32MS/32WS/16MD/16WD/32XD	(Guatemala) Christopher Martínez (Guatemala) Diana Corleto	(England) Rohan Thool (Kazakhstan) Kamila Smagulova
10 March	Giraldilla International: Dates: 12 March – 16 March; Host: Havana, Cuba; Venue: Coliseo de la Ciudad Deportiva; Level: Future Series; Format: 32MS/32WS/16MD/16WD/32XD	Score: 21–12, 21–12	
17 March	Swiss Open (Draw): Dates: 18 March – 23 March; Host: Basel, Switzerland; Venue: St. Jakobshalle; Level: Super 300; Prize: $250,000; Format: 32MS/32WS/32MD/32WD/32XD	(China) Weng Hongyang	(France) Christo Popov
17 March	Swiss Open (Draw): Dates: 18 March – 23 March; Host: Basel, Switzerland; Venue: St. Jakobshalle; Level: Super 300; Prize: $250,000; Format: 32MS/32WS/32MD/32WD/32XD	Score: 21–18, 21–3	
17 March	Swiss Open (Draw): Dates: 18 March – 23 March; Host: Basel, Switzerland; Venue: St. Jakobshalle; Level: Super 300; Prize: $250,000; Format: 32MS/32WS/32MD/32WD/32XD	(China) Chen Yufei	(Denmark) Line Kjærsfeldt
17 March	Swiss Open (Draw): Dates: 18 March – 23 March; Host: Basel, Switzerland; Venue: St. Jakobshalle; Level: Super 300; Prize: $250,000; Format: 32MS/32WS/32MD/32WD/32XD	Score: 21–17, 21–17	
17 March	Swiss Open (Draw): Dates: 18 March – 23 March; Host: Basel, Switzerland; Venue: St. Jakobshalle; Level: Super 300; Prize: $250,000; Format: 32MS/32WS/32MD/32WD/32XD	(Thailand) Kittinupong Kedren (Thailand) Dechapol Puavaranukroh	(Indonesia) Muhammad Shohibul Fikri (Indonesia) Daniel Marthin
17 March	Swiss Open (Draw): Dates: 18 March – 23 March; Host: Basel, Switzerland; Venue: St. Jakobshalle; Level: Super 300; Prize: $250,000; Format: 32MS/32WS/32MD/32WD/32XD	Score: 21–15, 18–21, 21–14	
17 March	Swiss Open (Draw): Dates: 18 March – 23 March; Host: Basel, Switzerland; Venue: St. Jakobshalle; Level: Super 300; Prize: $250,000; Format: 32MS/32WS/32MD/32WD/32XD	(China) Jia Yifan (China) Zhang Shuxian	(China) Liu Shengshu (China) Tan Ning
17 March	Swiss Open (Draw): Dates: 18 March – 23 March; Host: Basel, Switzerland; Venue: St. Jakobshalle; Level: Super 300; Prize: $250,000; Format: 32MS/32WS/32MD/32WD/32XD	Score: 21–19, 14–21, 21–17	
17 March	Swiss Open (Draw): Dates: 18 March – 23 March; Host: Basel, Switzerland; Venue: St. Jakobshalle; Level: Super 300; Prize: $250,000; Format: 32MS/32WS/32MD/32WD/32XD	(China) Feng Yanzhe (China) Wei Yaxin	(China) Zhu Yijun (China) Zhang Chi
17 March	Swiss Open (Draw): Dates: 18 March – 23 March; Host: Basel, Switzerland; Venue: St. Jakobshalle; Level: Super 300; Prize: $250,000; Format: 32MS/32WS/32MD/32WD/32XD	Score: 21–13, 21–15	
17 March	Polish Open: Dates: 19 March – 23 March; Host: Łódź, Poland; Venue: Hala Sportowa Miejskiego Ośrodka Sportu i Rekreacji w Łodzi; Level: International Challenge; Prize: $17,500; Format: 32MS/32WS/32MD/32WD/32XD	(France) Arnaud Merklé	(Finland) Joakim Oldorff
17 March	Polish Open: Dates: 19 March – 23 March; Host: Łódź, Poland; Venue: Hala Sportowa Miejskiego Ośrodka Sportu i Rekreacji w Łodzi; Level: International Challenge; Prize: $17,500; Format: 32MS/32WS/32MD/32WD/32XD	Score: 21–15, 21–17	
17 March	Polish Open: Dates: 19 March – 23 March; Host: Łódź, Poland; Venue: Hala Sportowa Miejskiego Ośrodka Sportu i Rekreacji w Łodzi; Level: International Challenge; Prize: $17,500; Format: 32MS/32WS/32MD/32WD/32XD	(Turkey) Neslihan Arın	(Chinese Taipei) Hung Yi-ting
17 March	Polish Open: Dates: 19 March – 23 March; Host: Łódź, Poland; Venue: Hala Sportowa Miejskiego Ośrodka Sportu i Rekreacji w Łodzi; Level: International Challenge; Prize: $17,500; Format: 32MS/32WS/32MD/32WD/32XD	Score: 21–13, 21–16	
17 March	Polish Open: Dates: 19 March – 23 March; Host: Łódź, Poland; Venue: Hala Sportowa Miejskiego Ośrodka Sportu i Rekreacji w Łodzi; Level: International Challenge; Prize: $17,500; Format: 32MS/32WS/32MD/32WD/32XD	(Chinese Taipei) Su Ching-heng (Chinese Taipei) Wu Guan-xun	(England) Rory Easton (England) Alex Green
17 March	Polish Open: Dates: 19 March – 23 March; Host: Łódź, Poland; Venue: Hala Sportowa Miejskiego Ośrodka Sportu i Rekreacji w Łodzi; Level: International Challenge; Prize: $17,500; Format: 32MS/32WS/32MD/32WD/32XD	Score: 18–21, 21–11, 21–18	
17 March	Polish Open: Dates: 19 March – 23 March; Host: Łódź, Poland; Venue: Hala Sportowa Miejskiego Ośrodka Sportu i Rekreacji w Łodzi; Level: International Challenge; Prize: $17,500; Format: 32MS/32WS/32MD/32WD/32XD	(United States) Lauren Lam (United States) Allison Lee	(Australia) Gronya Somerville (Australia) Angela Yu
17 March	Polish Open: Dates: 19 March – 23 March; Host: Łódź, Poland; Venue: Hala Sportowa Miejskiego Ośrodka Sportu i Rekreacji w Łodzi; Level: International Challenge; Prize: $17,500; Format: 32MS/32WS/32MD/32WD/32XD	Score: 19–21, 21–15, 21–15	
17 March	Polish Open: Dates: 19 March – 23 March; Host: Łódź, Poland; Venue: Hala Sportowa Miejskiego Ośrodka Sportu i Rekreacji w Łodzi; Level: International Challenge; Prize: $17,500; Format: 32MS/32WS/32MD/32WD/32XD	(Indonesia) Rehan Naufal Kusharjanto (Indonesia) Gloria Emanuelle Widjaja	(Denmark) Kristoffer Kolding (Denmark) Mette Werge
17 March	Polish Open: Dates: 19 March – 23 March; Host: Łódź, Poland; Venue: Hala Sportowa Miejskiego Ośrodka Sportu i Rekreacji w Łodzi; Level: International Challenge; Prize: $17,500; Format: 32MS/32WS/32MD/32WD/32XD	Score: 21–16, 14–21, 21–10	
24 March	Spain Masters (Draw) (cancelled): Dates: 25 March – 30 March; Host: Madrid, Spain; Venue: –; Level: Super 300; Prize: $240,000; Format: –		
24 March	Spain Masters (Draw) (cancelled): Dates: 25 March – 30 March; Host: Madrid, Spain; Venue: –; Level: Super 300; Prize: $240,000; Format: –	Score:	
24 March	Spain Masters (Draw) (cancelled): Dates: 25 March – 30 March; Host: Madrid, Spain; Venue: –; Level: Super 300; Prize: $240,000; Format: –	Score:	
24 March	Spain Masters (Draw) (cancelled): Dates: 25 March – 30 March; Host: Madrid, Spain; Venue: –; Level: Super 300; Prize: $240,000; Format: –	Score:	
24 March	Spain Masters (Draw) (cancelled): Dates: 25 March – 30 March; Host: Madrid, Spain; Venue: –; Level: Super 300; Prize: $240,000; Format: –	Score:	
24 March	Spain Masters (Draw) (cancelled): Dates: 25 March – 30 March; Host: Madrid, Spain; Venue: –; Level: Super 300; Prize: $240,000; Format: –	Score:	
24 March	Vietnam International: Dates: 25 March – 30 March; Host: Hanoi, Vietnam; Venue: Tay Ho District Stadium; Level: International Challenge; Prize: $17,500; Format: 64MS/32WS/32MD/32WD/32XD	(Thailand) Puritat Arree	(Malaysia) Kok Jing Hong
24 March	Vietnam International: Dates: 25 March – 30 March; Host: Hanoi, Vietnam; Venue: Tay Ho District Stadium; Level: International Challenge; Prize: $17,500; Format: 64MS/32WS/32MD/32WD/32XD	Score: 23–21, 17–21, 21–15	
24 March	Vietnam International: Dates: 25 March – 30 March; Host: Hanoi, Vietnam; Venue: Tay Ho District Stadium; Level: International Challenge; Prize: $17,500; Format: 64MS/32WS/32MD/32WD/32XD	(Japan) Manami Suizu	(Thailand) Pitchamon Opatniputh
24 March	Vietnam International: Dates: 25 March – 30 March; Host: Hanoi, Vietnam; Venue: Tay Ho District Stadium; Level: International Challenge; Prize: $17,500; Format: 64MS/32WS/32MD/32WD/32XD	Score: 21–11, 21–9	
24 March	Vietnam International: Dates: 25 March – 30 March; Host: Hanoi, Vietnam; Venue: Tay Ho District Stadium; Level: International Challenge; Prize: $17,500; Format: 64MS/32WS/32MD/32WD/32XD	(Vietnam) Nguyễn Đình Hoàng (Vietnam) Trần Đình Mạnh	(Japan) Kazuki Shibata (Japan) Naoki Yamada
24 March	Vietnam International: Dates: 25 March – 30 March; Host: Hanoi, Vietnam; Venue: Tay Ho District Stadium; Level: International Challenge; Prize: $17,500; Format: 64MS/32WS/32MD/32WD/32XD	Score: 21–19, 15–21, 21–15	
24 March	Vietnam International: Dates: 25 March – 30 March; Host: Hanoi, Vietnam; Venue: Tay Ho District Stadium; Level: International Challenge; Prize: $17,500; Format: 64MS/32WS/32MD/32WD/32XD	(Japan) Hina Osawa (Japan) Akari Sato	(Chinese Taipei) Hsu Ya-ching (Chinese Taipei) Sung Yu-hsuan
24 March	Vietnam International: Dates: 25 March – 30 March; Host: Hanoi, Vietnam; Venue: Tay Ho District Stadium; Level: International Challenge; Prize: $17,500; Format: 64MS/32WS/32MD/32WD/32XD	Score: 21–13, 21–12	
24 March	Vietnam International: Dates: 25 March – 30 March; Host: Hanoi, Vietnam; Venue: Tay Ho District Stadium; Level: International Challenge; Prize: $17,500; Format: 64MS/32WS/32MD/32WD/32XD	(Hong Kong) Tang Chun Man (Hong Kong) Ng Tsz Yau	(Malaysia) Jimmy Wong (Malaysia) Lai Pei Jing
24 March	Vietnam International: Dates: 25 March – 30 March; Host: Hanoi, Vietnam; Venue: Tay Ho District Stadium; Level: International Challenge; Prize: $17,500; Format: 64MS/32WS/32MD/32WD/32XD	Score: 21–19, 21–19	

=== April ===
Week commencing	Tournament	Champions	Runners-up
31 March	Thailand International Series: Dates: 1 April – 6 April; Host: Phuket, Thailand; Venue: Saphan Hin 4000 Seat Municipal Stadium; Level: International Series; Prize: $5,000; Format: 80MS/48WS/48MD/32WD/32XD	(Chinese Taipei) Wang Po-wei	(South Korea) Cho Geon-yeop
31 March	Thailand International Series: Dates: 1 April – 6 April; Host: Phuket, Thailand; Venue: Saphan Hin 4000 Seat Municipal Stadium; Level: International Series; Prize: $5,000; Format: 80MS/48WS/48MD/32WD/32XD	Score: 21–19, 21–13	
31 March	Thailand International Series: Dates: 1 April – 6 April; Host: Phuket, Thailand; Venue: Saphan Hin 4000 Seat Municipal Stadium; Level: International Series; Prize: $5,000; Format: 80MS/48WS/48MD/32WD/32XD	(Thailand) Tidapron Kleebyeesun	(China) Xu Wenjing
31 March	Thailand International Series: Dates: 1 April – 6 April; Host: Phuket, Thailand; Venue: Saphan Hin 4000 Seat Municipal Stadium; Level: International Series; Prize: $5,000; Format: 80MS/48WS/48MD/32WD/32XD	Score: 21–17, 23–21	
31 March	Thailand International Series: Dates: 1 April – 6 April; Host: Phuket, Thailand; Venue: Saphan Hin 4000 Seat Municipal Stadium; Level: International Series; Prize: $5,000; Format: 80MS/48WS/48MD/32WD/32XD	(China) Chen Xujun (China) Guo Ruohan	(Thailand) Pharanyu Kaosamaang (Thailand) Tanadon Punpanich
31 March	Thailand International Series: Dates: 1 April – 6 April; Host: Phuket, Thailand; Venue: Saphan Hin 4000 Seat Municipal Stadium; Level: International Series; Prize: $5,000; Format: 80MS/48WS/48MD/32WD/32XD	Score: 19–21, 21–15, 21–18	
31 March	Thailand International Series: Dates: 1 April – 6 April; Host: Phuket, Thailand; Venue: Saphan Hin 4000 Seat Municipal Stadium; Level: International Series; Prize: $5,000; Format: 80MS/48WS/48MD/32WD/32XD	(Thailand) Tidapron Kleebyeesun (Thailand) Nattamon Laisuan	(Thailand) Atitaya Povanon (Thailand) Patida Srisawat
31 March	Thailand International Series: Dates: 1 April – 6 April; Host: Phuket, Thailand; Venue: Saphan Hin 4000 Seat Municipal Stadium; Level: International Series; Prize: $5,000; Format: 80MS/48WS/48MD/32WD/32XD	Score: 21–13, 21–15	
31 March	Thailand International Series: Dates: 1 April – 6 April; Host: Phuket, Thailand; Venue: Saphan Hin 4000 Seat Municipal Stadium; Level: International Series; Prize: $5,000; Format: 80MS/48WS/48MD/32WD/32XD	(China) Gao Jiaxuan (China) Wu Mengying	(Malaysia) Jimmy Wong (Malaysia) Lai Pei Jing
31 March	Thailand International Series: Dates: 1 April – 6 April; Host: Phuket, Thailand; Venue: Saphan Hin 4000 Seat Municipal Stadium; Level: International Series; Prize: $5,000; Format: 80MS/48WS/48MD/32WD/32XD	Score: 21–17, 21–16	
7 April	Badminton Asia Championships (Draw): Dates: 8 April – 13 April; Host: Ningbo, China; Venue: Ningbo Olympic Sports Center Gymnasium; Level: Continental Individual Championships; Prize: $500,000; Format: 32MS/32WS/32MD/32WD/32XD	(Thailand) Kunlavut Vitidsarn	(China) Lu Guangzu
7 April	Badminton Asia Championships (Draw): Dates: 8 April – 13 April; Host: Ningbo, China; Venue: Ningbo Olympic Sports Center Gymnasium; Level: Continental Individual Championships; Prize: $500,000; Format: 32MS/32WS/32MD/32WD/32XD	Score: 21–12, 11–6 retired	
7 April	Badminton Asia Championships (Draw): Dates: 8 April – 13 April; Host: Ningbo, China; Venue: Ningbo Olympic Sports Center Gymnasium; Level: Continental Individual Championships; Prize: $500,000; Format: 32MS/32WS/32MD/32WD/32XD	(China) Chen Yufei	(China) Han Yue
7 April	Badminton Asia Championships (Draw): Dates: 8 April – 13 April; Host: Ningbo, China; Venue: Ningbo Olympic Sports Center Gymnasium; Level: Continental Individual Championships; Prize: $500,000; Format: 32MS/32WS/32MD/32WD/32XD	Score: 11–21, 21–14, 21–9	
7 April	Badminton Asia Championships (Draw): Dates: 8 April – 13 April; Host: Ningbo, China; Venue: Ningbo Olympic Sports Center Gymnasium; Level: Continental Individual Championships; Prize: $500,000; Format: 32MS/32WS/32MD/32WD/32XD	(Malaysia) Aaron Chia (Malaysia) Soh Wooi Yik	(China) Chen Boyang (China) Liu Yi
7 April	Badminton Asia Championships (Draw): Dates: 8 April – 13 April; Host: Ningbo, China; Venue: Ningbo Olympic Sports Center Gymnasium; Level: Continental Individual Championships; Prize: $500,000; Format: 32MS/32WS/32MD/32WD/32XD	Score: 21–19, 21–17	
7 April	Badminton Asia Championships (Draw): Dates: 8 April – 13 April; Host: Ningbo, China; Venue: Ningbo Olympic Sports Center Gymnasium; Level: Continental Individual Championships; Prize: $500,000; Format: 32MS/32WS/32MD/32WD/32XD	(China) Liu Shengshu (China) Tan Ning	(Japan) Nami Matsuyama (Japan) Chiharu Shida
7 April	Badminton Asia Championships (Draw): Dates: 8 April – 13 April; Host: Ningbo, China; Venue: Ningbo Olympic Sports Center Gymnasium; Level: Continental Individual Championships; Prize: $500,000; Format: 32MS/32WS/32MD/32WD/32XD	Score: 21–15, 21–19	
7 April	Badminton Asia Championships (Draw): Dates: 8 April – 13 April; Host: Ningbo, China; Venue: Ningbo Olympic Sports Center Gymnasium; Level: Continental Individual Championships; Prize: $500,000; Format: 32MS/32WS/32MD/32WD/32XD	(Hong Kong) Tang Chun Man (Hong Kong) Tse Ying Suet	(Japan) Hiroki Midorikawa (Japan) Natsu Saito
7 April	Badminton Asia Championships (Draw): Dates: 8 April – 13 April; Host: Ningbo, China; Venue: Ningbo Olympic Sports Center Gymnasium; Level: Continental Individual Championships; Prize: $500,000; Format: 32MS/32WS/32MD/32WD/32XD	Score: 21–15, 17–21, 21–13	
7 April	European Badminton Championships (Draw): Dates: 8 April – 13 April; Host: Horsens, Denmark; Venue: Forum Horsens; Level: Continental Individual Championships; Format: 64MS/64WS/32MD/32WD/32XD	(France) Alex Lanier	(France) Toma Junior Popov
7 April	European Badminton Championships (Draw): Dates: 8 April – 13 April; Host: Horsens, Denmark; Venue: Forum Horsens; Level: Continental Individual Championships; Format: 64MS/64WS/32MD/32WD/32XD	Score: 21–17, 21–18	
7 April	European Badminton Championships (Draw): Dates: 8 April – 13 April; Host: Horsens, Denmark; Venue: Forum Horsens; Level: Continental Individual Championships; Format: 64MS/64WS/32MD/32WD/32XD	(Denmark) Line Kjærsfeldt	(Scotland) Kirsty Gilmour
7 April	European Badminton Championships (Draw): Dates: 8 April – 13 April; Host: Horsens, Denmark; Venue: Forum Horsens; Level: Continental Individual Championships; Format: 64MS/64WS/32MD/32WD/32XD	Score: 21–16, 21–17	
7 April	European Badminton Championships (Draw): Dates: 8 April – 13 April; Host: Horsens, Denmark; Venue: Forum Horsens; Level: Continental Individual Championships; Format: 64MS/64WS/32MD/32WD/32XD	(France) Christo Popov (France) Toma Junior Popov	(France) Éloi Adam (France) Léo Rossi
7 April	European Badminton Championships (Draw): Dates: 8 April – 13 April; Host: Horsens, Denmark; Venue: Forum Horsens; Level: Continental Individual Championships; Format: 64MS/64WS/32MD/32WD/32XD	Score: 21–12, 18–21, 21–18	
7 April	European Badminton Championships (Draw): Dates: 8 April – 13 April; Host: Horsens, Denmark; Venue: Forum Horsens; Level: Continental Individual Championships; Format: 64MS/64WS/32MD/32WD/32XD	(Bulgaria) Gabriela Stoeva (Bulgaria) Stefani Stoeva	(Denmark) Natasja Anthonisen (Denmark) Maiken Fruergaard
7 April	European Badminton Championships (Draw): Dates: 8 April – 13 April; Host: Horsens, Denmark; Venue: Forum Horsens; Level: Continental Individual Championships; Format: 64MS/64WS/32MD/32WD/32XD	Score: 21–11, 21–16	
7 April	European Badminton Championships (Draw): Dates: 8 April – 13 April; Host: Horsens, Denmark; Venue: Forum Horsens; Level: Continental Individual Championships; Format: 64MS/64WS/32MD/32WD/32XD	(Denmark) Jesper Toft (Denmark) Amalie Magelund	(France) Thom Gicquel (France) Delphine Delrue
7 April	European Badminton Championships (Draw): Dates: 8 April – 13 April; Host: Horsens, Denmark; Venue: Forum Horsens; Level: Continental Individual Championships; Format: 64MS/64WS/32MD/32WD/32XD	Score: 21–18, 21–19	
7 April	Pan American Badminton Championships (Draw): Dates: 9 April – 13 April; Host: Lima, Peru; Venue: Videna Poli 2; Level: Continental Individual Championships; Format: 64MS/64WS/32MD/32WD/32XD	(Canada) Victor Lai	(Canada) Joshua Nguyen
7 April	Pan American Badminton Championships (Draw): Dates: 9 April – 13 April; Host: Lima, Peru; Venue: Videna Poli 2; Level: Continental Individual Championships; Format: 64MS/64WS/32MD/32WD/32XD	Score: 21–9, 21–18	
7 April	Pan American Badminton Championships (Draw): Dates: 9 April – 13 April; Host: Lima, Peru; Venue: Videna Poli 2; Level: Continental Individual Championships; Format: 64MS/64WS/32MD/32WD/32XD	(Brazil) Juliana Vieira	(Canada) Wen Yu Zhang
7 April	Pan American Badminton Championships (Draw): Dates: 9 April – 13 April; Host: Lima, Peru; Venue: Videna Poli 2; Level: Continental Individual Championships; Format: 64MS/64WS/32MD/32WD/32XD	Score: 21–19, 15–21, 21–8	
7 April	Pan American Badminton Championships (Draw): Dates: 9 April – 13 April; Host: Lima, Peru; Venue: Videna Poli 2; Level: Continental Individual Championships; Format: 64MS/64WS/32MD/32WD/32XD	(United States) Chen Zhi-yi (United States) Presley Smith	(Brazil) Fabrício Farias (Brazil) Davi Silva
7 April	Pan American Badminton Championships (Draw): Dates: 9 April – 13 April; Host: Lima, Peru; Venue: Videna Poli 2; Level: Continental Individual Championships; Format: 64MS/64WS/32MD/32WD/32XD	Score: 21–16, 21–6	
7 April	Pan American Badminton Championships (Draw): Dates: 9 April – 13 April; Host: Lima, Peru; Venue: Videna Poli 2; Level: Continental Individual Championships; Format: 64MS/64WS/32MD/32WD/32XD	(United States) Lauren Lam (United States) Allison Lee	(Canada) Jackie Dent (Canada) Crystal Lai
7 April	Pan American Badminton Championships (Draw): Dates: 9 April – 13 April; Host: Lima, Peru; Venue: Videna Poli 2; Level: Continental Individual Championships; Format: 64MS/64WS/32MD/32WD/32XD	Score: 21–11, 21–13	
7 April	Pan American Badminton Championships (Draw): Dates: 9 April – 13 April; Host: Lima, Peru; Venue: Videna Poli 2; Level: Continental Individual Championships; Format: 64MS/64WS/32MD/32WD/32XD	(Canada) Ty Alexander Lindeman (Canada) Josephine Wu	(Canada) Jonathan Lai (Canada) Crystal Lai
7 April	Pan American Badminton Championships (Draw): Dates: 9 April – 13 April; Host: Lima, Peru; Venue: Videna Poli 2; Level: Continental Individual Championships; Format: 64MS/64WS/32MD/32WD/32XD	Score: 21–15, 21–15	
21 April	Malta International: Dates: 24 April – 27 April; Host: Cospicua, Malta; Venue: Cottonera Sports Complex; Level: Future Series; Format: 32MS/32WS/24MD/24WD/24XD	(South Korea) Yoo Tae-bin	(Poland) Dominik Kwinta
21 April	Malta International: Dates: 24 April – 27 April; Host: Cospicua, Malta; Venue: Cottonera Sports Complex; Level: Future Series; Format: 32MS/32WS/24MD/24WD/24XD	Score: 21–11, 21–11	
21 April	Malta International: Dates: 24 April – 27 April; Host: Cospicua, Malta; Venue: Cottonera Sports Complex; Level: Future Series; Format: 32MS/32WS/24MD/24WD/24XD	(Germany) Miranda Wilson	(Republic of Ireland) Sophia Noble
21 April	Malta International: Dates: 24 April – 27 April; Host: Cospicua, Malta; Venue: Cottonera Sports Complex; Level: Future Series; Format: 32MS/32WS/24MD/24WD/24XD	Score: 22–20, 21–14	
21 April	Malta International: Dates: 24 April – 27 April; Host: Cospicua, Malta; Venue: Cottonera Sports Complex; Level: Future Series; Format: 32MS/32WS/24MD/24WD/24XD	(Chinese Taipei) Chen Sheng-fa (Chinese Taipei) Lu Chen	(England) Robin Harper (England) Harry Wakefield
21 April	Malta International: Dates: 24 April – 27 April; Host: Cospicua, Malta; Venue: Cottonera Sports Complex; Level: Future Series; Format: 32MS/32WS/24MD/24WD/24XD	Score: 21–14, 21–7	
21 April	Malta International: Dates: 24 April – 27 April; Host: Cospicua, Malta; Venue: Cottonera Sports Complex; Level: Future Series; Format: 32MS/32WS/24MD/24WD/24XD	(Poland) Anastasiya Khomich (Poland) Ulyana Volskaya	(Netherlands) Kirsten de Wit (Netherlands) Meerte Loos
21 April	Malta International: Dates: 24 April – 27 April; Host: Cospicua, Malta; Venue: Cottonera Sports Complex; Level: Future Series; Format: 32MS/32WS/24MD/24WD/24XD	Score: 21–14, 23–21	
21 April	Malta International: Dates: 24 April – 27 April; Host: Cospicua, Malta; Venue: Cottonera Sports Complex; Level: Future Series; Format: 32MS/32WS/24MD/24WD/24XD	(France) Louis Lefevre (France) Carla Martinez	(Spain) Vicente Gázquez (Spain) Amaía Torralba
21 April	Malta International: Dates: 24 April – 27 April; Host: Cospicua, Malta; Venue: Cottonera Sports Complex; Level: Future Series; Format: 32MS/32WS/24MD/24WD/24XD	Score: 21–19, 21–17	
21 April	Sudirman Cup (Draw): Dates: 27 April – 4 May; Host: Xiamen, China; Venue: Xiamen Olympic Sports Center Fenghuang Gymnasium; Level: World Mixed Team Championships; Format: 16 teams	China	South Korea
21 April	Sudirman Cup (Draw): Dates: 27 April – 4 May; Host: Xiamen, China; Venue: Xiamen Olympic Sports Center Fenghuang Gymnasium; Level: World Mixed Team Championships; Format: 16 teams	Feng Yanzhe; Huang Dongping	Seo Seung-jae; Chae Yoo-jung
21 April	Sudirman Cup (Draw): Dates: 27 April – 4 May; Host: Xiamen, China; Venue: Xiamen Olympic Sports Center Fenghuang Gymnasium; Level: World Mixed Team Championships; Format: 16 teams	Wang Zhiyi	An Se-young
21 April	Sudirman Cup (Draw): Dates: 27 April – 4 May; Host: Xiamen, China; Venue: Xiamen Olympic Sports Center Fenghuang Gymnasium; Level: World Mixed Team Championships; Format: 16 teams	Shi Yuqi	Jeon Hyeok-jin
21 April	Sudirman Cup (Draw): Dates: 27 April – 4 May; Host: Xiamen, China; Venue: Xiamen Olympic Sports Center Fenghuang Gymnasium; Level: World Mixed Team Championships; Format: 16 teams	Liu Shengshu; Tan Ning	Baek Ha-na; Lee So-hee
21 April	Sudirman Cup (Draw): Dates: 27 April – 4 May; Host: Xiamen, China; Venue: Xiamen Olympic Sports Center Fenghuang Gymnasium; Level: World Mixed Team Championships; Format: 16 teams	Liang Weikeng; Wang Chang	Kim Won-ho; Seo Seung-jae
21 April	Sudirman Cup (Draw): Dates: 27 April – 4 May; Host: Xiamen, China; Venue: Xiamen Olympic Sports Center Fenghuang Gymnasium; Level: World Mixed Team Championships; Format: 16 teams	Score: 3–1	

=== May ===
Week commencing	Tournament	Champions	Runners-up
28 April	Luxembourg Open: Dates: 1 May – 4 May; Host: Luxembourg, Luxembourg; Venue: Centre National Sportif et Culturel; Level: International Series; Prize: $10,000; Format: 32MS/32WS/24MD/24WD/24XD	(South Korea) Yoo Tae-bin	(Chinese Taipei) Liao Jhuo-fu
28 April	Luxembourg Open: Dates: 1 May – 4 May; Host: Luxembourg, Luxembourg; Venue: Centre National Sportif et Culturel; Level: International Series; Prize: $10,000; Format: 32MS/32WS/24MD/24WD/24XD	Score: 21–19, 21–6	
28 April	Luxembourg Open: Dates: 1 May – 4 May; Host: Luxembourg, Luxembourg; Venue: Centre National Sportif et Culturel; Level: International Series; Prize: $10,000; Format: 32MS/32WS/24MD/24WD/24XD	(Indonesia) Mutiara Ayu Puspitasari	(Indonesia) Ni Kadek Dhinda Amartya Pratiwi
28 April	Luxembourg Open: Dates: 1 May – 4 May; Host: Luxembourg, Luxembourg; Venue: Centre National Sportif et Culturel; Level: International Series; Prize: $10,000; Format: 32MS/32WS/24MD/24WD/24XD	Score: 21–13, 13–21, 21–12	
28 April	Luxembourg Open: Dates: 1 May – 4 May; Host: Luxembourg, Luxembourg; Venue: Centre National Sportif et Culturel; Level: International Series; Prize: $10,000; Format: 32MS/32WS/24MD/24WD/24XD	(Indonesia) Raymond Indra (Indonesia) Nikolaus Joaquin	(Indonesia) Putra Erwiansyah (Indonesia) Daniel Edgar Marvino
28 April	Luxembourg Open: Dates: 1 May – 4 May; Host: Luxembourg, Luxembourg; Venue: Centre National Sportif et Culturel; Level: International Series; Prize: $10,000; Format: 32MS/32WS/24MD/24WD/24XD	Score: 21–15, 22–20	
28 April	Luxembourg Open: Dates: 1 May – 4 May; Host: Luxembourg, Luxembourg; Venue: Centre National Sportif et Culturel; Level: International Series; Prize: $10,000; Format: 32MS/32WS/24MD/24WD/24XD	(Indonesia) Isyana Syahira Meida (Indonesia) Rinjani Kwinara Nastine	(Denmark) Lærke Hvid (Denmark) Anna Klausholm
28 April	Luxembourg Open: Dates: 1 May – 4 May; Host: Luxembourg, Luxembourg; Venue: Centre National Sportif et Culturel; Level: International Series; Prize: $10,000; Format: 32MS/32WS/24MD/24WD/24XD	Score: 21–14, 21–6	
28 April	Luxembourg Open: Dates: 1 May – 4 May; Host: Luxembourg, Luxembourg; Venue: Centre National Sportif et Culturel; Level: International Series; Prize: $10,000; Format: 32MS/32WS/24MD/24WD/24XD	(Germany) Marvin Seidel (Germany) Thuc Phuong Nguyen	(Denmark) Kristoffer Kolding (Denmark) Mette Werge
28 April	Luxembourg Open: Dates: 1 May – 4 May; Host: Luxembourg, Luxembourg; Venue: Centre National Sportif et Culturel; Level: International Series; Prize: $10,000; Format: 32MS/32WS/24MD/24WD/24XD	Score: 21–13, 22–24, 21–11	
5 May	Taipei Open (Draw): Dates: 6 May – 11 May; Host: Taipei, Taiwan; Venue: Taipei Arena; Level: Super 300; Prize: $240,000; Format: 32MS/32WS/32MD/32WD/32XD	(Singapore) Loh Kean Yew	(Chinese Taipei) Chou Tien-chen
5 May	Taipei Open (Draw): Dates: 6 May – 11 May; Host: Taipei, Taiwan; Venue: Taipei Arena; Level: Super 300; Prize: $240,000; Format: 32MS/32WS/32MD/32WD/32XD	Score: 21–14, 15–21, 22–20	
5 May	Taipei Open (Draw): Dates: 6 May – 11 May; Host: Taipei, Taiwan; Venue: Taipei Arena; Level: Super 300; Prize: $240,000; Format: 32MS/32WS/32MD/32WD/32XD	(Japan) Tomoka Miyazaki	(Thailand) Pitchamon Opatniputh
5 May	Taipei Open (Draw): Dates: 6 May – 11 May; Host: Taipei, Taiwan; Venue: Taipei Arena; Level: Super 300; Prize: $240,000; Format: 32MS/32WS/32MD/32WD/32XD	Score: 21–12, 20–22, 21–14	
5 May	Taipei Open (Draw): Dates: 6 May – 11 May; Host: Taipei, Taiwan; Venue: Taipei Arena; Level: Super 300; Prize: $240,000; Format: 32MS/32WS/32MD/32WD/32XD	(Chinese Taipei) Chiu Hsiang-chieh (Chinese Taipei) Wang Chi-lin	(South Korea) Kang Min-hyuk (South Korea) Ki Dong-ju
5 May	Taipei Open (Draw): Dates: 6 May – 11 May; Host: Taipei, Taiwan; Venue: Taipei Arena; Level: Super 300; Prize: $240,000; Format: 32MS/32WS/32MD/32WD/32XD	Score: 21–18, 21–15	
5 May	Taipei Open (Draw): Dates: 6 May – 11 May; Host: Taipei, Taiwan; Venue: Taipei Arena; Level: Super 300; Prize: $240,000; Format: 32MS/32WS/32MD/32WD/32XD	(Chinese Taipei) Hsieh Pei-shan (Chinese Taipei) Hung En-tzu	(Japan) Mizuki Otake (Japan) Miyu Takahashi
5 May	Taipei Open (Draw): Dates: 6 May – 11 May; Host: Taipei, Taiwan; Venue: Taipei Arena; Level: Super 300; Prize: $240,000; Format: 32MS/32WS/32MD/32WD/32XD	Score: 21–14, 21–15	
5 May	Taipei Open (Draw): Dates: 6 May – 11 May; Host: Taipei, Taiwan; Venue: Taipei Arena; Level: Super 300; Prize: $240,000; Format: 32MS/32WS/32MD/32WD/32XD	(Indonesia) Jafar Hidayatullah (Indonesia) Felisha Pasaribu	(Indonesia) Dejan Ferdinansyah (Indonesia) Siti Fadia Silva Ramadhanti
5 May	Taipei Open (Draw): Dates: 6 May – 11 May; Host: Taipei, Taiwan; Venue: Taipei Arena; Level: Super 300; Prize: $240,000; Format: 32MS/32WS/32MD/32WD/32XD	Score: 18–21, 21–13, 21–17	
5 May	Slovak Open: Dates: 7 May – 10 May; Host: Bratislava, Slovakia; Venue: Multisport hall; Level: Future Series; Format: 32MS/32WS/32MD/32WD/32XD	(Belgium) Charles Fouyn	(Sweden) Muh Azahbru Kasra
5 May	Slovak Open: Dates: 7 May – 10 May; Host: Bratislava, Slovakia; Venue: Multisport hall; Level: Future Series; Format: 32MS/32WS/32MD/32WD/32XD	Score: 13–21, 21–9, 23–21	
5 May	Slovak Open: Dates: 7 May – 10 May; Host: Bratislava, Slovakia; Venue: Multisport hall; Level: Future Series; Format: 32MS/32WS/32MD/32WD/32XD	(India) Aalisha Naik	(Chinese Taipei) Liao Jui-chi
5 May	Slovak Open: Dates: 7 May – 10 May; Host: Bratislava, Slovakia; Venue: Multisport hall; Level: Future Series; Format: 32MS/32WS/32MD/32WD/32XD	Score: 25–23, 21–9	
5 May	Slovak Open: Dates: 7 May – 10 May; Host: Bratislava, Slovakia; Venue: Multisport hall; Level: Future Series; Format: 32MS/32WS/32MD/32WD/32XD	(Poland) Adrian Krawczyk (Poland) Szymon Ślepecki	(Malaysia) Loh Zi Heng (Malaysia) Tan Zhi Yang
5 May	Slovak Open: Dates: 7 May – 10 May; Host: Bratislava, Slovakia; Venue: Multisport hall; Level: Future Series; Format: 32MS/32WS/32MD/32WD/32XD	Score: 21–15, 12–21, 21–19	
5 May	Slovak Open: Dates: 7 May – 10 May; Host: Bratislava, Slovakia; Venue: Multisport hall; Level: Future Series; Format: 32MS/32WS/32MD/32WD/32XD	(Malaysia) Low Zi Yu (Malaysia) Dania Sofea	(Malaysia) Noraqilah Maisarah (Malaysia) Nur Aina Maisarah
5 May	Slovak Open: Dates: 7 May – 10 May; Host: Bratislava, Slovakia; Venue: Multisport hall; Level: Future Series; Format: 32MS/32WS/32MD/32WD/32XD	Score: 21–17, 21–19	
5 May	Slovak Open: Dates: 7 May – 10 May; Host: Bratislava, Slovakia; Venue: Multisport hall; Level: Future Series; Format: 32MS/32WS/32MD/32WD/32XD	(Serbia) Mihajlo Tomić (Serbia) Andjela Vitman	(Chinese Taipei) Chen Hung-ming (Chinese Taipei) Chang Yun-jung
5 May	Slovak Open: Dates: 7 May – 10 May; Host: Bratislava, Slovakia; Venue: Multisport hall; Level: Future Series; Format: 32MS/32WS/32MD/32WD/32XD	Score: 21–13, 21–8	
5 May	Mexican International: Dates: 7 May – 11 May; Host: Guadalajara, Mexico; Venue: CODE Alcalde Section II; Level: International Challenge; Prize: $17,500; Format: 32MS/32WS/32MD/16WD/32XD	(United States) Mark Alcala	(United States) Garret Tan
5 May	Mexican International: Dates: 7 May – 11 May; Host: Guadalajara, Mexico; Venue: CODE Alcalde Section II; Level: International Challenge; Prize: $17,500; Format: 32MS/32WS/32MD/16WD/32XD	Score: 15–13, 15–7	
5 May	Mexican International: Dates: 7 May – 11 May; Host: Guadalajara, Mexico; Venue: CODE Alcalde Section II; Level: International Challenge; Prize: $17,500; Format: 32MS/32WS/32MD/16WD/32XD	(Japan) Sakura Masuki	(Japan) Shiori Ebihara
5 May	Mexican International: Dates: 7 May – 11 May; Host: Guadalajara, Mexico; Venue: CODE Alcalde Section II; Level: International Challenge; Prize: $17,500; Format: 32MS/32WS/32MD/16WD/32XD	Score: 15–8, 15–10	
5 May	Mexican International: Dates: 7 May – 11 May; Host: Guadalajara, Mexico; Venue: CODE Alcalde Section II; Level: International Challenge; Prize: $17,500; Format: 32MS/32WS/32MD/16WD/32XD	(Japan) Haruki Kawabe (Japan) Kenta Matsukawa	(Japan) Seiya Inoue (Japan) Yuto Kida
5 May	Mexican International: Dates: 7 May – 11 May; Host: Guadalajara, Mexico; Venue: CODE Alcalde Section II; Level: International Challenge; Prize: $17,500; Format: 32MS/32WS/32MD/16WD/32XD	Score: 15–5, 15–10	
5 May	Mexican International: Dates: 7 May – 11 May; Host: Guadalajara, Mexico; Venue: CODE Alcalde Section II; Level: International Challenge; Prize: $17,500; Format: 32MS/32WS/32MD/16WD/32XD	(Japan) Kaho Osawa (Japan) Mai Tanabe	(Japan) Mao Hatasue (Japan) Miku Sugiyama
5 May	Mexican International: Dates: 7 May – 11 May; Host: Guadalajara, Mexico; Venue: CODE Alcalde Section II; Level: International Challenge; Prize: $17,500; Format: 32MS/32WS/32MD/16WD/32XD	Score: 15–11, 15–8	
5 May	Mexican International: Dates: 7 May – 11 May; Host: Guadalajara, Mexico; Venue: CODE Alcalde Section II; Level: International Challenge; Prize: $17,500; Format: 32MS/32WS/32MD/16WD/32XD	(Japan) Akira Koga (Japan) Yuho Imai	(Brazil) Davi Silva (Brazil) Sânia Lima
5 May	Mexican International: Dates: 7 May – 11 May; Host: Guadalajara, Mexico; Venue: CODE Alcalde Section II; Level: International Challenge; Prize: $17,500; Format: 32MS/32WS/32MD/16WD/32XD	Score: 15–8, 9–15, 15–9	
5 May	Denmark Challenge: Dates: 8 May – 11 May; Host: Farum, Denmark; Venue: Farum Arena; Level: International Challenge; Prize: $17,500; Format: 32MS/32WS/32MD/32WD/32XD	(France) Arnaud Merklé	(Chinese Taipei) Ting Yen-chen
5 May	Denmark Challenge: Dates: 8 May – 11 May; Host: Farum, Denmark; Venue: Farum Arena; Level: International Challenge; Prize: $17,500; Format: 32MS/32WS/32MD/32WD/32XD	Score: 21–15, 13–21, 22–20	
5 May	Denmark Challenge: Dates: 8 May – 11 May; Host: Farum, Denmark; Venue: Farum Arena; Level: International Challenge; Prize: $17,500; Format: 32MS/32WS/32MD/32WD/32XD	(India) Tanvi Sharma	(Indonesia) Ni Kadek Dhinda Amartya Pratiwi
5 May	Denmark Challenge: Dates: 8 May – 11 May; Host: Farum, Denmark; Venue: Farum Arena; Level: International Challenge; Prize: $17,500; Format: 32MS/32WS/32MD/32WD/32XD	Score: 21–13, 21–10	
5 May	Denmark Challenge: Dates: 8 May – 11 May; Host: Farum, Denmark; Venue: Farum Arena; Level: International Challenge; Prize: $17,500; Format: 32MS/32WS/32MD/32WD/32XD	(Indonesia) Raymond Indra (Indonesia) Nikolaus Joaquin	(Japan) Yuto Noda (Japan) Shunya Ota
5 May	Denmark Challenge: Dates: 8 May – 11 May; Host: Farum, Denmark; Venue: Farum Arena; Level: International Challenge; Prize: $17,500; Format: 32MS/32WS/32MD/32WD/32XD	Score: 21–16, 21–8	
5 May	Denmark Challenge: Dates: 8 May – 11 May; Host: Farum, Denmark; Venue: Farum Arena; Level: International Challenge; Prize: $17,500; Format: 32MS/32WS/32MD/32WD/32XD	(Japan) Mikoto Aiso (Japan) Momoha Niimi	(Indonesia) Isyana Syahira Meida (Indonesia) Rinjani Kwinara Nastine
5 May	Denmark Challenge: Dates: 8 May – 11 May; Host: Farum, Denmark; Venue: Farum Arena; Level: International Challenge; Prize: $17,500; Format: 32MS/32WS/32MD/32WD/32XD	Score: 21–15, 17–21, 28–26	
5 May	Denmark Challenge: Dates: 8 May – 11 May; Host: Farum, Denmark; Venue: Farum Arena; Level: International Challenge; Prize: $17,500; Format: 32MS/32WS/32MD/32WD/32XD	(Indonesia) Zaidan Arrafi Awal Nabawi (Indonesia) Jessica Maya Rismawardani	(Denmark) Rasmus Espersen (Denmark) Amalie Cecilie Kudsk
5 May	Denmark Challenge: Dates: 8 May – 11 May; Host: Farum, Denmark; Venue: Farum Arena; Level: International Challenge; Prize: $17,500; Format: 32MS/32WS/32MD/32WD/32XD	Score: 21–14, 21–13	
12 May	Thailand Open (Draw): Dates: 13 May – 18 May; Host: Bangkok, Thailand; Venue: Nimibutr Stadium; Level: Super 500; Prize: $475,000; Format: 32MS/32WS/32MD/32WD/32XD	(Thailand) Kunlavut Vitidsarn	(Denmark) Anders Antonsen
12 May	Thailand Open (Draw): Dates: 13 May – 18 May; Host: Bangkok, Thailand; Venue: Nimibutr Stadium; Level: Super 500; Prize: $475,000; Format: 32MS/32WS/32MD/32WD/32XD	Score: 21–16, 17–21, 21–9	
12 May	Thailand Open (Draw): Dates: 13 May – 18 May; Host: Bangkok, Thailand; Venue: Nimibutr Stadium; Level: Super 500; Prize: $475,000; Format: 32MS/32WS/32MD/32WD/32XD	(China) Chen Yufei	(Thailand) Pornpawee Chochuwong
12 May	Thailand Open (Draw): Dates: 13 May – 18 May; Host: Bangkok, Thailand; Venue: Nimibutr Stadium; Level: Super 500; Prize: $475,000; Format: 32MS/32WS/32MD/32WD/32XD	Score: 21–16, 21–12	
12 May	Thailand Open (Draw): Dates: 13 May – 18 May; Host: Bangkok, Thailand; Venue: Nimibutr Stadium; Level: Super 500; Prize: $475,000; Format: 32MS/32WS/32MD/32WD/32XD	(Malaysia) Aaron Chia (Malaysia) Soh Wooi Yik	(Denmark) William Kryger Boe (Denmark) Christian Faust Kjær
12 May	Thailand Open (Draw): Dates: 13 May – 18 May; Host: Bangkok, Thailand; Venue: Nimibutr Stadium; Level: Super 500; Prize: $475,000; Format: 32MS/32WS/32MD/32WD/32XD	Score: 20–22, 21–17, 21–12	
12 May	Thailand Open (Draw): Dates: 13 May – 18 May; Host: Bangkok, Thailand; Venue: Nimibutr Stadium; Level: Super 500; Prize: $475,000; Format: 32MS/32WS/32MD/32WD/32XD	(Malaysia) Pearly Tan (Malaysia) Thinaah Muralitharan	(South Korea) Jeong Na-eun (South Korea) Lee Yeon-woo
12 May	Thailand Open (Draw): Dates: 13 May – 18 May; Host: Bangkok, Thailand; Venue: Nimibutr Stadium; Level: Super 500; Prize: $475,000; Format: 32MS/32WS/32MD/32WD/32XD	Score: 21–16, 21–17	
12 May	Thailand Open (Draw): Dates: 13 May – 18 May; Host: Bangkok, Thailand; Venue: Nimibutr Stadium; Level: Super 500; Prize: $475,000; Format: 32MS/32WS/32MD/32WD/32XD	(China) Feng Yanzhe (China) Huang Dongping	(China) Gao Jiaxuan (China) Wu Mengying
12 May	Thailand Open (Draw): Dates: 13 May – 18 May; Host: Bangkok, Thailand; Venue: Nimibutr Stadium; Level: Super 500; Prize: $475,000; Format: 32MS/32WS/32MD/32WD/32XD	Score: 24–22, 21–16	
12 May	Réunion Open: Dates: 14 May – 18 May; Host: Saint-Denis, La Réunion; Venue: Gymnasium Champ Fleuri; Level: International Challenge; Prize: $24,500; Format: 32MS/32WS/32MD/32WD/32XD	(Japan) Riki Takei	(India) B. M. Rahul Bharadwaj
12 May	Réunion Open: Dates: 14 May – 18 May; Host: Saint-Denis, La Réunion; Venue: Gymnasium Champ Fleuri; Level: International Challenge; Prize: $24,500; Format: 32MS/32WS/32MD/32WD/32XD	Score: 21–7, 21–5	
12 May	Réunion Open: Dates: 14 May – 18 May; Host: Saint-Denis, La Réunion; Venue: Gymnasium Champ Fleuri; Level: International Challenge; Prize: $24,500; Format: 32MS/32WS/32MD/32WD/32XD	(India) Isharani Baruah	(India) Shriyanshi Valishetty
12 May	Réunion Open: Dates: 14 May – 18 May; Host: Saint-Denis, La Réunion; Venue: Gymnasium Champ Fleuri; Level: International Challenge; Prize: $24,500; Format: 32MS/32WS/32MD/32WD/32XD	Score: 21–19, 21–15	
12 May	Réunion Open: Dates: 14 May – 18 May; Host: Saint-Denis, La Réunion; Venue: Gymnasium Champ Fleuri; Level: International Challenge; Prize: $24,500; Format: 32MS/32WS/32MD/32WD/32XD	(India) Hariharan Amsakarunan (India) Ruban Kumar	(France) Maël Cattoen (France) Lucas Renoir
12 May	Réunion Open: Dates: 14 May – 18 May; Host: Saint-Denis, La Réunion; Venue: Gymnasium Champ Fleuri; Level: International Challenge; Prize: $24,500; Format: 32MS/32WS/32MD/32WD/32XD	Score: 21–12, 21–11	
12 May	Réunion Open: Dates: 14 May – 18 May; Host: Saint-Denis, La Réunion; Venue: Gymnasium Champ Fleuri; Level: International Challenge; Prize: $24,500; Format: 32MS/32WS/32MD/32WD/32XD	(Sweden) Moa Sjöö (Sweden) Tilda Sjöö	(France) Lilou Schaffner (Ukraine) Mariia Stoliarenko
12 May	Réunion Open: Dates: 14 May – 18 May; Host: Saint-Denis, La Réunion; Venue: Gymnasium Champ Fleuri; Level: International Challenge; Prize: $24,500; Format: 32MS/32WS/32MD/32WD/32XD	Score: 14–21, 21–7, 21–15	
12 May	Réunion Open: Dates: 14 May – 18 May; Host: Saint-Denis, La Réunion; Venue: Gymnasium Champ Fleuri; Level: International Challenge; Prize: $24,500; Format: 32MS/32WS/32MD/32WD/32XD	(Germany) Marvin Seidel (Germany) Thuc Phuong Nguyen	(Malaysia) Jimmy Wong (Malaysia) Lai Pei Jing
12 May	Réunion Open: Dates: 14 May – 18 May; Host: Saint-Denis, La Réunion; Venue: Gymnasium Champ Fleuri; Level: International Challenge; Prize: $24,500; Format: 32MS/32WS/32MD/32WD/32XD	Score: 17–21, 22–20, 21–18	
12 May	Slovenia Open: Dates: 14 May – 18 May; Host: Maribor, Slovenia; Venue: Hotel Draš; Level: International Series; Prize: $5,000; Format: 64MS/64WS/32MD/32WD/32XD	(Malaysia) Eogene Ewe	(South Korea) Yoo Tae-bin
12 May	Slovenia Open: Dates: 14 May – 18 May; Host: Maribor, Slovenia; Venue: Hotel Draš; Level: International Series; Prize: $5,000; Format: 64MS/64WS/32MD/32WD/32XD	Score: 21–19, 12–21, 21–17	
12 May	Slovenia Open: Dates: 14 May – 18 May; Host: Maribor, Slovenia; Venue: Hotel Draš; Level: International Series; Prize: $5,000; Format: 64MS/64WS/32MD/32WD/32XD	(Malaysia) Wong Ling Ching	(Indonesia) Deswanti Hujansih Nurtertiati
12 May	Slovenia Open: Dates: 14 May – 18 May; Host: Maribor, Slovenia; Venue: Hotel Draš; Level: International Series; Prize: $5,000; Format: 64MS/64WS/32MD/32WD/32XD	Score: 21–16, 21–15	
12 May	Slovenia Open: Dates: 14 May – 18 May; Host: Maribor, Slovenia; Venue: Hotel Draš; Level: International Series; Prize: $5,000; Format: 64MS/64WS/32MD/32WD/32XD	(Chinese Taipei) Huang Tsung-i (Chinese Taipei) Lin Ting-yu	(Indonesia) Jonathan Farrell Gosal (Indonesia) Adrian Pratama
12 May	Slovenia Open: Dates: 14 May – 18 May; Host: Maribor, Slovenia; Venue: Hotel Draš; Level: International Series; Prize: $5,000; Format: 64MS/64WS/32MD/32WD/32XD	Score: 27–25, 19–21, 21–17	
12 May	Slovenia Open: Dates: 14 May – 18 May; Host: Maribor, Slovenia; Venue: Hotel Draš; Level: International Series; Prize: $5,000; Format: 64MS/64WS/32MD/32WD/32XD	(Chinese Taipei) Lin Chih-chun (Chinese Taipei) Lin Wan-ching	(Sweden) Malena Norrman (Austria) Xu Wei
12 May	Slovenia Open: Dates: 14 May – 18 May; Host: Maribor, Slovenia; Venue: Hotel Draš; Level: International Series; Prize: $5,000; Format: 64MS/64WS/32MD/32WD/32XD	Score: 21–7, 21–14	
12 May	Slovenia Open: Dates: 14 May – 18 May; Host: Maribor, Slovenia; Venue: Hotel Draš; Level: International Series; Prize: $5,000; Format: 64MS/64WS/32MD/32WD/32XD	(Chinese Taipei) Wu Guan-xun (Chinese Taipei) Lee Chia-hsin	(Indonesia) Patra Harapan Rindorindo (Indonesia) Az Zahra Ditya Ramadhani
12 May	Slovenia Open: Dates: 14 May – 18 May; Host: Maribor, Slovenia; Venue: Hotel Draš; Level: International Series; Prize: $5,000; Format: 64MS/64WS/32MD/32WD/32XD	Score: 21–19, 21–13	
19 May	Malaysia Masters (Draw): Dates: 20 May – 25 May; Host: Kuala Lumpur, Malaysia; Venue: Axiata Arena; Level: Super 500; Prize: $475,000; Format: 32MS/32WS/32MD/32WD/32XD	(China) Li Shifeng	(India) Srikanth Kidambi
19 May	Malaysia Masters (Draw): Dates: 20 May – 25 May; Host: Kuala Lumpur, Malaysia; Venue: Axiata Arena; Level: Super 500; Prize: $475,000; Format: 32MS/32WS/32MD/32WD/32XD	Score: 21–11, 21–9	
19 May	Malaysia Masters (Draw): Dates: 20 May – 25 May; Host: Kuala Lumpur, Malaysia; Venue: Axiata Arena; Level: Super 500; Prize: $475,000; Format: 32MS/32WS/32MD/32WD/32XD	(China) Wang Zhiyi	(China) Han Yue
19 May	Malaysia Masters (Draw): Dates: 20 May – 25 May; Host: Kuala Lumpur, Malaysia; Venue: Axiata Arena; Level: Super 500; Prize: $475,000; Format: 32MS/32WS/32MD/32WD/32XD	Score: 13–21, 21–13, 21–18	
19 May	Malaysia Masters (Draw): Dates: 20 May – 25 May; Host: Kuala Lumpur, Malaysia; Venue: Axiata Arena; Level: Super 500; Prize: $475,000; Format: 32MS/32WS/32MD/32WD/32XD	(Malaysia) Man Wei Chong (Malaysia) Tee Kai Wun	(Malaysia) Aaron Chia (Malaysia) Soh Wooi Yik
19 May	Malaysia Masters (Draw): Dates: 20 May – 25 May; Host: Kuala Lumpur, Malaysia; Venue: Axiata Arena; Level: Super 500; Prize: $475,000; Format: 32MS/32WS/32MD/32WD/32XD	Score: 21–12, 15–21, 21–16	
19 May	Malaysia Masters (Draw): Dates: 20 May – 25 May; Host: Kuala Lumpur, Malaysia; Venue: Axiata Arena; Level: Super 500; Prize: $475,000; Format: 32MS/32WS/32MD/32WD/32XD	(China) Liu Shengshu (China) Tan Ning	(China) Jia Yifan (China) Zhang Shuxian
19 May	Malaysia Masters (Draw): Dates: 20 May – 25 May; Host: Kuala Lumpur, Malaysia; Venue: Axiata Arena; Level: Super 500; Prize: $475,000; Format: 32MS/32WS/32MD/32WD/32XD	Score: 21–17, 21–18	
19 May	Malaysia Masters (Draw): Dates: 20 May – 25 May; Host: Kuala Lumpur, Malaysia; Venue: Axiata Arena; Level: Super 500; Prize: $475,000; Format: 32MS/32WS/32MD/32WD/32XD	(China) Feng Yanzhe (China) Huang Dongping	(China) Jiang Zhenbang (China) Wei Yaxin
19 May	Malaysia Masters (Draw): Dates: 20 May – 25 May; Host: Kuala Lumpur, Malaysia; Venue: Axiata Arena; Level: Super 500; Prize: $475,000; Format: 32MS/32WS/32MD/32WD/32XD	Score: 21–17, 14–21, 21–16	
19 May	Austrian Open: Dates: 22 May – 25 May; Host: Graz, Austria; Venue: Raiffeisen Sportpark Graz; Level: International Series; Prize: $5,023; Format: 32MS/32WS/32MD/32WD/32XD	(Denmark) Magnus Johannesen	(England) Harry Huang
19 May	Austrian Open: Dates: 22 May – 25 May; Host: Graz, Austria; Venue: Raiffeisen Sportpark Graz; Level: International Series; Prize: $5,023; Format: 32MS/32WS/32MD/32WD/32XD	Score: 21–17, 21–14	
19 May	Austrian Open: Dates: 22 May – 25 May; Host: Graz, Austria; Venue: Raiffeisen Sportpark Graz; Level: International Series; Prize: $5,023; Format: 32MS/32WS/32MD/32WD/32XD	(Denmark) Amalie Schulz	(India) Aalisha Naik
19 May	Austrian Open: Dates: 22 May – 25 May; Host: Graz, Austria; Venue: Raiffeisen Sportpark Graz; Level: International Series; Prize: $5,023; Format: 32MS/32WS/32MD/32WD/32XD	Score: 11–21, 21–15, 21–14	
19 May	Austrian Open: Dates: 22 May – 25 May; Host: Graz, Austria; Venue: Raiffeisen Sportpark Graz; Level: International Series; Prize: $5,023; Format: 32MS/32WS/32MD/32WD/32XD	(Singapore) Donovan Wee (Singapore) Howin Wong	(Chinese Taipei) Huang Tsung-i (Chinese Taipei) Lin Ting-yu
19 May	Austrian Open: Dates: 22 May – 25 May; Host: Graz, Austria; Venue: Raiffeisen Sportpark Graz; Level: International Series; Prize: $5,023; Format: 32MS/32WS/32MD/32WD/32XD	Score: 21–14, 21–16	
19 May	Austrian Open: Dates: 22 May – 25 May; Host: Graz, Austria; Venue: Raiffeisen Sportpark Graz; Level: International Series; Prize: $5,023; Format: 32MS/32WS/32MD/32WD/32XD	(France) Elsa Jacob (France) Anne Tran	(Chinese Taipei) Lin Chih-chun (Chinese Taipei) Lin Wan-ching
19 May	Austrian Open: Dates: 22 May – 25 May; Host: Graz, Austria; Venue: Raiffeisen Sportpark Graz; Level: International Series; Prize: $5,023; Format: 32MS/32WS/32MD/32WD/32XD	Score: 21–16, 21–14	
19 May	Austrian Open: Dates: 22 May – 25 May; Host: Graz, Austria; Venue: Raiffeisen Sportpark Graz; Level: International Series; Prize: $5,023; Format: 32MS/32WS/32MD/32WD/32XD	(Spain) Rubén García (Spain) Lucía Rodríguez	(Indonesia) Bimo Prasetyo (Indonesia) Arlya Nabila Thesya Munggaran
19 May	Austrian Open: Dates: 22 May – 25 May; Host: Graz, Austria; Venue: Raiffeisen Sportpark Graz; Level: International Series; Prize: $5,023; Format: 32MS/32WS/32MD/32WD/32XD	Score: 21–17, 21–18	
19 May	Mauritius International (cancelled): Dates: 22 May – 25 May; Host: Saint Pierre, Mauritius; Venue: Level: International Series; Prize: $5,000; Format: 32MS/32WS/24MD/24WD/24XD		
19 May	Mauritius International (cancelled): Dates: 22 May – 25 May; Host: Saint Pierre, Mauritius; Venue: Level: International Series; Prize: $5,000; Format: 32MS/32WS/24MD/24WD/24XD	Score:	
19 May	Mauritius International (cancelled): Dates: 22 May – 25 May; Host: Saint Pierre, Mauritius; Venue: Level: International Series; Prize: $5,000; Format: 32MS/32WS/24MD/24WD/24XD	Score:	
19 May	Mauritius International (cancelled): Dates: 22 May – 25 May; Host: Saint Pierre, Mauritius; Venue: Level: International Series; Prize: $5,000; Format: 32MS/32WS/24MD/24WD/24XD	Score:	
19 May	Mauritius International (cancelled): Dates: 22 May – 25 May; Host: Saint Pierre, Mauritius; Venue: Level: International Series; Prize: $5,000; Format: 32MS/32WS/24MD/24WD/24XD	Score:	
19 May	Mauritius International (cancelled): Dates: 22 May – 25 May; Host: Saint Pierre, Mauritius; Venue: Level: International Series; Prize: $5,000; Format: 32MS/32WS/24MD/24WD/24XD	Score:	
26 May	Singapore Open (Draw): Dates: 27 May – 1 June; Host: Singapore; Venue: Singapore Indoor Stadium; Level: Super 750; Prize: $1,000,000; Format: 32MS/32WS/32MD/32WD/32XD	(Thailand) Kunlavut Vitidsarn	(China) Lu Guangzu
26 May	Singapore Open (Draw): Dates: 27 May – 1 June; Host: Singapore; Venue: Singapore Indoor Stadium; Level: Super 750; Prize: $1,000,000; Format: 32MS/32WS/32MD/32WD/32XD	Score: 21–6, 21–10	
26 May	Singapore Open (Draw): Dates: 27 May – 1 June; Host: Singapore; Venue: Singapore Indoor Stadium; Level: Super 750; Prize: $1,000,000; Format: 32MS/32WS/32MD/32WD/32XD	(China) Chen Yufei	(China) Wang Zhiyi
26 May	Singapore Open (Draw): Dates: 27 May – 1 June; Host: Singapore; Venue: Singapore Indoor Stadium; Level: Super 750; Prize: $1,000,000; Format: 32MS/32WS/32MD/32WD/32XD	Score: 21–11, 21–11	
26 May	Singapore Open (Draw): Dates: 27 May – 1 June; Host: Singapore; Venue: Singapore Indoor Stadium; Level: Super 750; Prize: $1,000,000; Format: 32MS/32WS/32MD/32WD/32XD	(Malaysia) Aaron Chia (Malaysia) Soh Wooi Yik	(South Korea) Kim Won-ho (South Korea) Seo Seung-jae
26 May	Singapore Open (Draw): Dates: 27 May – 1 June; Host: Singapore; Venue: Singapore Indoor Stadium; Level: Super 750; Prize: $1,000,000; Format: 32MS/32WS/32MD/32WD/32XD	Score: 15–21, 21–18, 21–19	
26 May	Singapore Open (Draw): Dates: 27 May – 1 June; Host: Singapore; Venue: Singapore Indoor Stadium; Level: Super 750; Prize: $1,000,000; Format: 32MS/32WS/32MD/32WD/32XD	(South Korea) Kim Hye-jeong (South Korea) Kong Hee-yong	(Japan) Rin Iwanaga (Japan) Kie Nakanishi
26 May	Singapore Open (Draw): Dates: 27 May – 1 June; Host: Singapore; Venue: Singapore Indoor Stadium; Level: Super 750; Prize: $1,000,000; Format: 32MS/32WS/32MD/32WD/32XD	Score: 21–16, 21–14	
26 May	Singapore Open (Draw): Dates: 27 May – 1 June; Host: Singapore; Venue: Singapore Indoor Stadium; Level: Super 750; Prize: $1,000,000; Format: 32MS/32WS/32MD/32WD/32XD	(Thailand) Dechapol Puavaranukroh (Thailand) Supissara Paewsampran	(Hong Kong) Tang Chun Man (Hong Kong) Tse Ying Suet
26 May	Singapore Open (Draw): Dates: 27 May – 1 June; Host: Singapore; Venue: Singapore Indoor Stadium; Level: Super 750; Prize: $1,000,000; Format: 32MS/32WS/32MD/32WD/32XD	Score: 21–16, 21–9	
26 May	Bonn International: Dates: 28 May – 31 May; Host: Bonn, Germany; Venue: Erwin Kranz Halle; Level: Future Series; Format: 32MS/32WS/32MD/32WD/32XD	(Canada) Joshua Nguyen	(Azerbaijan) Ade Resky Dwicahyo
26 May	Bonn International: Dates: 28 May – 31 May; Host: Bonn, Germany; Venue: Erwin Kranz Halle; Level: Future Series; Format: 32MS/32WS/32MD/32WD/32XD	Score: 21–9, 17–21, 21–17	
26 May	Bonn International: Dates: 28 May – 31 May; Host: Bonn, Germany; Venue: Erwin Kranz Halle; Level: Future Series; Format: 32MS/32WS/32MD/32WD/32XD	(Germany) Miranda Wilson	(Republic of Ireland) Sophia Noble
26 May	Bonn International: Dates: 28 May – 31 May; Host: Bonn, Germany; Venue: Erwin Kranz Halle; Level: Future Series; Format: 32MS/32WS/32MD/32WD/32XD	Score: 21–18, 18–21, 21–16	
26 May	Bonn International: Dates: 28 May – 31 May; Host: Bonn, Germany; Venue: Erwin Kranz Halle; Level: Future Series; Format: 32MS/32WS/32MD/32WD/32XD	(Germany) Jonathan Dresp (Germany) Simon Krax	(France) Thibault Gardon (France) Ewan Goulin
26 May	Bonn International: Dates: 28 May – 31 May; Host: Bonn, Germany; Venue: Erwin Kranz Halle; Level: Future Series; Format: 32MS/32WS/32MD/32WD/32XD	Score: 21–16, 21–16	
26 May	Bonn International: Dates: 28 May – 31 May; Host: Bonn, Germany; Venue: Erwin Kranz Halle; Level: Future Series; Format: 32MS/32WS/32MD/32WD/32XD	(France) Agathe Cuevas (France) Kathell Desmots-Chacun	(Spain) Nikol Carulla (Spain) Carmen Jiménez
26 May	Bonn International: Dates: 28 May – 31 May; Host: Bonn, Germany; Venue: Erwin Kranz Halle; Level: Future Series; Format: 32MS/32WS/32MD/32WD/32XD	Score: 22–20, 21–15	
26 May	Bonn International: Dates: 28 May – 31 May; Host: Bonn, Germany; Venue: Erwin Kranz Halle; Level: Future Series; Format: 32MS/32WS/32MD/32WD/32XD	(Germany) Jan Colin Völker (Germany) Stine Küspert	(Sweden) Filip Karlborg (Sweden) Tilda Sjöö
26 May	Bonn International: Dates: 28 May – 31 May; Host: Bonn, Germany; Venue: Erwin Kranz Halle; Level: Future Series; Format: 32MS/32WS/32MD/32WD/32XD	Score: 21–13, 22–24, 21–15	

=== June ===
Week commencing	Tournament	Champions	Runners-up
2 June	Indonesia Open (Draw): Dates: 3 June – 8 June; Host: Jakarta, Indonesia; Venue: Istora Senayan; Level: Super 1000; Prize: $1,450,000; Format: 32MS/32WS/32MD/32WD/32XD	(Denmark) Anders Antonsen	(Chinese Taipei) Chou Tien-chen
2 June	Indonesia Open (Draw): Dates: 3 June – 8 June; Host: Jakarta, Indonesia; Venue: Istora Senayan; Level: Super 1000; Prize: $1,450,000; Format: 32MS/32WS/32MD/32WD/32XD	Score: 22–20, 21–14	
2 June	Indonesia Open (Draw): Dates: 3 June – 8 June; Host: Jakarta, Indonesia; Venue: Istora Senayan; Level: Super 1000; Prize: $1,450,000; Format: 32MS/32WS/32MD/32WD/32XD	(South Korea) An Se-young	(China) Wang Zhiyi
2 June	Indonesia Open (Draw): Dates: 3 June – 8 June; Host: Jakarta, Indonesia; Venue: Istora Senayan; Level: Super 1000; Prize: $1,450,000; Format: 32MS/32WS/32MD/32WD/32XD	Score: 13–21, 21–19, 21–15	
2 June	Indonesia Open (Draw): Dates: 3 June – 8 June; Host: Jakarta, Indonesia; Venue: Istora Senayan; Level: Super 1000; Prize: $1,450,000; Format: 32MS/32WS/32MD/32WD/32XD	(South Korea) Kim Won-ho (South Korea) Seo Seung-jae	(Indonesia) Sabar Karyaman Gutama (Indonesia) Muhammad Reza Pahlevi Isfahani
2 June	Indonesia Open (Draw): Dates: 3 June – 8 June; Host: Jakarta, Indonesia; Venue: Istora Senayan; Level: Super 1000; Prize: $1,450,000; Format: 32MS/32WS/32MD/32WD/32XD	Score: 18–21, 21–19, 21–12	
2 June	Indonesia Open (Draw): Dates: 3 June – 8 June; Host: Jakarta, Indonesia; Venue: Istora Senayan; Level: Super 1000; Prize: $1,450,000; Format: 32MS/32WS/32MD/32WD/32XD	(China) Liu Shengshu (China) Tan Ning	(Malaysia) Pearly Tan (Malaysia) Thinaah Muralitharan
2 June	Indonesia Open (Draw): Dates: 3 June – 8 June; Host: Jakarta, Indonesia; Venue: Istora Senayan; Level: Super 1000; Prize: $1,450,000; Format: 32MS/32WS/32MD/32WD/32XD	Score: 23–25, 21–12, 21–19	
2 June	Indonesia Open (Draw): Dates: 3 June – 8 June; Host: Jakarta, Indonesia; Venue: Istora Senayan; Level: Super 1000; Prize: $1,450,000; Format: 32MS/32WS/32MD/32WD/32XD	(France) Thom Gicquel (France) Delphine Delrue	(Thailand) Dechapol Puavaranukroh (Thailand) Supissara Paewsampran
2 June	Indonesia Open (Draw): Dates: 3 June – 8 June; Host: Jakarta, Indonesia; Venue: Istora Senayan; Level: Super 1000; Prize: $1,450,000; Format: 32MS/32WS/32MD/32WD/32XD	Score: 21–16, 21–18	
2 June	Guaraní Open: Dates: 4 June – 8 June; Host: Asunción, Paraguay; Venue: SND Arena; Level: Future Series; Format: 32MS/32WS/16MD/16WD/32XD	(India) Dhruv Negi	(Canada) Timothy Lock
2 June	Guaraní Open: Dates: 4 June – 8 June; Host: Asunción, Paraguay; Venue: SND Arena; Level: Future Series; Format: 32MS/32WS/16MD/16WD/32XD	Score: 21–19, 11–3 retired	
2 June	Guaraní Open: Dates: 4 June – 8 June; Host: Asunción, Paraguay; Venue: SND Arena; Level: Future Series; Format: 32MS/32WS/16MD/16WD/32XD	(Peru) Namie Miyahira	(Peru) Rafaela Munar
2 June	Guaraní Open: Dates: 4 June – 8 June; Host: Asunción, Paraguay; Venue: SND Arena; Level: Future Series; Format: 32MS/32WS/16MD/16WD/32XD	Score: 21–7, 21–12	
2 June	Guaraní Open: Dates: 4 June – 8 June; Host: Asunción, Paraguay; Venue: SND Arena; Level: Future Series; Format: 32MS/32WS/16MD/16WD/32XD	(Canada) Clarence Chau (Canada) Wong Yan Kit	(Brazil) Joaquim Mendonça (Brazil) Pedro Mendonça
2 June	Guaraní Open: Dates: 4 June – 8 June; Host: Asunción, Paraguay; Venue: SND Arena; Level: Future Series; Format: 32MS/32WS/16MD/16WD/32XD	Score: 21–11, 22–20	
2 June	Guaraní Open: Dates: 4 June – 8 June; Host: Asunción, Paraguay; Venue: SND Arena; Level: Future Series; Format: 32MS/32WS/16MD/16WD/32XD	(Canada) Eyota Kwan (Canada) Johnna Rymes	(Peru) Fernanda Munar (Peru) Rafaela Munar
2 June	Guaraní Open: Dates: 4 June – 8 June; Host: Asunción, Paraguay; Venue: SND Arena; Level: Future Series; Format: 32MS/32WS/16MD/16WD/32XD	Score: 21–15, 21–19	
2 June	Guaraní Open: Dates: 4 June – 8 June; Host: Asunción, Paraguay; Venue: SND Arena; Level: Future Series; Format: 32MS/32WS/16MD/16WD/32XD	(Canada) Clarence Chau (Canada) Eyota Kwan	(Canada) Wong Yan Kit (Canada) Johnna Rymes
2 June	Guaraní Open: Dates: 4 June – 8 June; Host: Asunción, Paraguay; Venue: SND Arena; Level: Future Series; Format: 32MS/32WS/16MD/16WD/32XD	Score: 21–6, 26–24	
9 June	Venezuela Future Series: Dates: 10 June – 14 June; Host: Maracay, Aragua, Venezuela; Venue: Gimnasio Mauricio Jhonson de las Delicias; Level: Future Series; Format: 32MS/16WS/16MD/8WD/16XD	(England) Rohan Thool	(Azerbaijan) Ulvi Huseynov
9 June	Venezuela Future Series: Dates: 10 June – 14 June; Host: Maracay, Aragua, Venezuela; Venue: Gimnasio Mauricio Jhonson de las Delicias; Level: Future Series; Format: 32MS/16WS/16MD/8WD/16XD	Score: 15–13, 15–5	
9 June	Venezuela Future Series: Dates: 10 June – 14 June; Host: Maracay, Aragua, Venezuela; Venue: Gimnasio Mauricio Jhonson de las Delicias; Level: Future Series; Format: 32MS/16WS/16MD/8WD/16XD	(Mexico) Vanessa García	(Brazil) Maria Nascimento
9 June	Venezuela Future Series: Dates: 10 June – 14 June; Host: Maracay, Aragua, Venezuela; Venue: Gimnasio Mauricio Jhonson de las Delicias; Level: Future Series; Format: 32MS/16WS/16MD/8WD/16XD	Score: 15–3, 15–6	
9 June	Venezuela Future Series: Dates: 10 June – 14 June; Host: Maracay, Aragua, Venezuela; Venue: Gimnasio Mauricio Jhonson de las Delicias; Level: Future Series; Format: 32MS/16WS/16MD/8WD/16XD	(Brazil) Vinicius Eberling (Brazil) Gabriel Zink	(Venezuela) Frank Barrios (Venezuela) William Barrios
9 June	Venezuela Future Series: Dates: 10 June – 14 June; Host: Maracay, Aragua, Venezuela; Venue: Gimnasio Mauricio Jhonson de las Delicias; Level: Future Series; Format: 32MS/16WS/16MD/8WD/16XD	Score: 15–8, 15–17, 15–11	
9 June	Venezuela Future Series: Dates: 10 June – 14 June; Host: Maracay, Aragua, Venezuela; Venue: Gimnasio Mauricio Jhonson de las Delicias; Level: Future Series; Format: 32MS/16WS/16MD/8WD/16XD	(Brazil) Daiane Carvalho (Brazil) Maria Nascimento	(Venezuela) Mariangel Garcia (Venezuela) Maria Rojas
9 June	Venezuela Future Series: Dates: 10 June – 14 June; Host: Maracay, Aragua, Venezuela; Venue: Gimnasio Mauricio Jhonson de las Delicias; Level: Future Series; Format: 32MS/16WS/16MD/8WD/16XD	Score: 9–15, 15–10, 15–10	
9 June	Venezuela Future Series: Dates: 10 June – 14 June; Host: Maracay, Aragua, Venezuela; Venue: Gimnasio Mauricio Jhonson de las Delicias; Level: Future Series; Format: 32MS/16WS/16MD/8WD/16XD	(Mexico) Maximiliano Peregrina (Mexico) Miriam Rodríguez	(Azerbaijan) Ulvi Huseynov (Azerbaijan) Leyla Jamalzade
9 June	Venezuela Future Series: Dates: 10 June – 14 June; Host: Maracay, Aragua, Venezuela; Venue: Gimnasio Mauricio Jhonson de las Delicias; Level: Future Series; Format: 32MS/16WS/16MD/8WD/16XD	Score: 15–11, 15–9	
9 June	Latvia International: Dates: 11 June – 15 June; Host: Riga, Latvia; Venue: Rimi Olympic Centre; Level: Future Series; Format: 32MS/32WS/32MD/32WD/32XD	(Malaysia) Lee Shun Yang	(Chinese Taipei) Chiang Tzu-chieh
9 June	Latvia International: Dates: 11 June – 15 June; Host: Riga, Latvia; Venue: Rimi Olympic Centre; Level: Future Series; Format: 32MS/32WS/32MD/32WD/32XD	Score: 18–21, 21–16, 22–20	
9 June	Latvia International: Dates: 11 June – 15 June; Host: Riga, Latvia; Venue: Rimi Olympic Centre; Level: Future Series; Format: 32MS/32WS/32MD/32WD/32XD	(Chinese Taipei) Wang Yu-si	(Finland) Nella Nyqvist
9 June	Latvia International: Dates: 11 June – 15 June; Host: Riga, Latvia; Venue: Rimi Olympic Centre; Level: Future Series; Format: 32MS/32WS/32MD/32WD/32XD	Score: 21–19, 21–17	
9 June	Latvia International: Dates: 11 June – 15 June; Host: Riga, Latvia; Venue: Rimi Olympic Centre; Level: Future Series; Format: 32MS/32WS/32MD/32WD/32XD	(Spain) Jacobo Fernandez (Spain) Alberto Perals	(Estonia) Kristjan Kaljurand (Estonia) Raul Käsner
9 June	Latvia International: Dates: 11 June – 15 June; Host: Riga, Latvia; Venue: Rimi Olympic Centre; Level: Future Series; Format: 32MS/32WS/32MD/32WD/32XD	Score: 21–10, 21–12	
9 June	Latvia International: Dates: 11 June – 15 June; Host: Riga, Latvia; Venue: Rimi Olympic Centre; Level: Future Series; Format: 32MS/32WS/32MD/32WD/32XD	(Estonia) Catlyn Kruus (Estonia) Ramona Üprus	(England) Yiyi Tao (Malaysia) Wong Kha Yan
9 June	Latvia International: Dates: 11 June – 15 June; Host: Riga, Latvia; Venue: Rimi Olympic Centre; Level: Future Series; Format: 32MS/32WS/32MD/32WD/32XD	Score: 21–14, 26–24	
9 June	Latvia International: Dates: 11 June – 15 June; Host: Riga, Latvia; Venue: Rimi Olympic Centre; Level: Future Series; Format: 32MS/32WS/32MD/32WD/32XD	(Estonia) Mikk Õunmaa (Estonia) Ramona Üprus	(Czech Republic) Patrik Hrazdíra (Czech Republic) KateřIna Osladilová
9 June	Latvia International: Dates: 11 June – 15 June; Host: Riga, Latvia; Venue: Rimi Olympic Centre; Level: Future Series; Format: 32MS/32WS/32MD/32WD/32XD	Score: 21–18, 21–14	
16 June	Northern Marianas International: Dates: 17 June – 21 June; Host: Saipan, Northern Mariana Islands; Venue: Gilbert C. Ada Gymnasium; Level: International Series; Prize: $5,000; Format: 64MS/32WS/32MD/16WD/32XD	(South Korea) Yoo Tae-bin	(South Korea) Cho Geon-yeop
16 June	Northern Marianas International: Dates: 17 June – 21 June; Host: Saipan, Northern Mariana Islands; Venue: Gilbert C. Ada Gymnasium; Level: International Series; Prize: $5,000; Format: 64MS/32WS/32MD/16WD/32XD	Score: 21–11, 17–21, 21–13	
16 June	Northern Marianas International: Dates: 17 June – 21 June; Host: Saipan, Northern Mariana Islands; Venue: Gilbert C. Ada Gymnasium; Level: International Series; Prize: $5,000; Format: 64MS/32WS/32MD/16WD/32XD	(South Korea) Park Ga-eun	(South Korea) Kim Min-sun
16 June	Northern Marianas International: Dates: 17 June – 21 June; Host: Saipan, Northern Mariana Islands; Venue: Gilbert C. Ada Gymnasium; Level: International Series; Prize: $5,000; Format: 64MS/32WS/32MD/16WD/32XD	Score: 19–21, 21–16, 21–9	
16 June	Northern Marianas International: Dates: 17 June – 21 June; Host: Saipan, Northern Mariana Islands; Venue: Gilbert C. Ada Gymnasium; Level: International Series; Prize: $5,000; Format: 64MS/32WS/32MD/16WD/32XD	(South Korea) Kim Jae-hyeon (South Korea) Lee Sang-won	(Japan) Naoya Kawashima (Japan) Akira Koga
16 June	Northern Marianas International: Dates: 17 June – 21 June; Host: Saipan, Northern Mariana Islands; Venue: Gilbert C. Ada Gymnasium; Level: International Series; Prize: $5,000; Format: 64MS/32WS/32MD/16WD/32XD	Score: 21–16, 21–15	
16 June	Northern Marianas International: Dates: 17 June – 21 June; Host: Saipan, Northern Mariana Islands; Venue: Gilbert C. Ada Gymnasium; Level: International Series; Prize: $5,000; Format: 64MS/32WS/32MD/16WD/32XD	(South Korea) Jang Eun-seo (South Korea) Kim Yu-jung	(South Korea) Kim Min-ji (South Korea) Lee Ye-na
16 June	Northern Marianas International: Dates: 17 June – 21 June; Host: Saipan, Northern Mariana Islands; Venue: Gilbert C. Ada Gymnasium; Level: International Series; Prize: $5,000; Format: 64MS/32WS/32MD/16WD/32XD	Score: 21–10, 21–13	
16 June	Northern Marianas International: Dates: 17 June – 21 June; Host: Saipan, Northern Mariana Islands; Venue: Gilbert C. Ada Gymnasium; Level: International Series; Prize: $5,000; Format: 64MS/32WS/32MD/16WD/32XD	(South Korea) Kim Jae-hyeon (South Korea) Kim Min-ji	(Japan) Akira Koga (Japan) Yuho Imai
16 June	Northern Marianas International: Dates: 17 June – 21 June; Host: Saipan, Northern Mariana Islands; Venue: Gilbert C. Ada Gymnasium; Level: International Series; Prize: $5,000; Format: 64MS/32WS/32MD/16WD/32XD	Score: 21–13, 16–21, 21–18	
16 June	Czech International: Dates: 19 June – 22 June; Host: České Budějovice, Czech Republic; Venue: Městská sportovní hala; Level: Future Series; Format: 32MS/32WS/32MD/32WD/32XD	(Austria) Collins Valentine Filimon	(Turkey) Emre Lale
16 June	Czech International: Dates: 19 June – 22 June; Host: České Budějovice, Czech Republic; Venue: Městská sportovní hala; Level: Future Series; Format: 32MS/32WS/32MD/32WD/32XD	Score: 15–10, 15–7	
16 June	Czech International: Dates: 19 June – 22 June; Host: České Budějovice, Czech Republic; Venue: Městská sportovní hala; Level: Future Series; Format: 32MS/32WS/32MD/32WD/32XD	(Chinese Taipei) Wang Yu-si	(Republic of Ireland) Sophia Noble
16 June	Czech International: Dates: 19 June – 22 June; Host: České Budějovice, Czech Republic; Venue: Městská sportovní hala; Level: Future Series; Format: 32MS/32WS/32MD/32WD/32XD	Score: 15–13, 15–12	
16 June	Czech International: Dates: 19 June – 22 June; Host: České Budějovice, Czech Republic; Venue: Městská sportovní hala; Level: Future Series; Format: 32MS/32WS/32MD/32WD/32XD	(Germany) Jonathan Dresp (Germany) Simon Krax	(Turkey) Buğra Aktaş (Turkey) Emre Sönmez
16 June	Czech International: Dates: 19 June – 22 June; Host: České Budějovice, Czech Republic; Venue: Městská sportovní hala; Level: Future Series; Format: 32MS/32WS/32MD/32WD/32XD	Score: 15–13, 15–10	
16 June	Czech International: Dates: 19 June – 22 June; Host: České Budějovice, Czech Republic; Venue: Městská sportovní hala; Level: Future Series; Format: 32MS/32WS/32MD/32WD/32XD	(Turkey) Yasemen Bektaş (Turkey) Sinem Yıldız	(Germany) Selin Hübsch (Germany) Amelie Lehmann
16 June	Czech International: Dates: 19 June – 22 June; Host: České Budějovice, Czech Republic; Venue: Městská sportovní hala; Level: Future Series; Format: 32MS/32WS/32MD/32WD/32XD	Score: 14–16, 15–8, 17–15	
16 June	Czech International: Dates: 19 June – 22 June; Host: České Budějovice, Czech Republic; Venue: Městská sportovní hala; Level: Future Series; Format: 32MS/32WS/32MD/32WD/32XD	(Germany) Simon Krax (Germany) Amelie Lehmann	(Turkey) Emre Sönmez (Turkey) Yasemen Bektaş
16 June	Czech International: Dates: 19 June – 22 June; Host: České Budějovice, Czech Republic; Venue: Městská sportovní hala; Level: Future Series; Format: 32MS/32WS/32MD/32WD/32XD	Score: 15–11, 15–13	
23 June	U.S. Open (Draw): Dates: 24 June – 29 June; Host: Council Bluffs, United States; Venue: Mid-America Center; Level: Super 300; Prize: $240,000; Format: 32MS/32WS/32MD/32WD/32XD	(India) Ayush Shetty	(Canada) Brian Yang
23 June	U.S. Open (Draw): Dates: 24 June – 29 June; Host: Council Bluffs, United States; Venue: Mid-America Center; Level: Super 300; Prize: $240,000; Format: 32MS/32WS/32MD/32WD/32XD	Score: 21–18, 21–13	
23 June	U.S. Open (Draw): Dates: 24 June – 29 June; Host: Council Bluffs, United States; Venue: Mid-America Center; Level: Super 300; Prize: $240,000; Format: 32MS/32WS/32MD/32WD/32XD	(United States) Beiwen Zhang	(India) Tanvi Sharma
23 June	U.S. Open (Draw): Dates: 24 June – 29 June; Host: Council Bluffs, United States; Venue: Mid-America Center; Level: Super 300; Prize: $240,000; Format: 32MS/32WS/32MD/32WD/32XD	Score: 21–11, 16–21, 21–10	
23 June	U.S. Open (Draw): Dates: 24 June – 29 June; Host: Council Bluffs, United States; Venue: Mid-America Center; Level: Super 300; Prize: $240,000; Format: 32MS/32WS/32MD/32WD/32XD	(Chinese Taipei) Lai Po-yu (Chinese Taipei) Tsai Fu-cheng	(Chinese Taipei) He Zhi-wei (Chinese Taipei) Huang Jui-hsuan
23 June	U.S. Open (Draw): Dates: 24 June – 29 June; Host: Council Bluffs, United States; Venue: Mid-America Center; Level: Super 300; Prize: $240,000; Format: 32MS/32WS/32MD/32WD/32XD	Score: 21–13, 21–23, 21–15	
23 June	U.S. Open (Draw): Dates: 24 June – 29 June; Host: Council Bluffs, United States; Venue: Mid-America Center; Level: Super 300; Prize: $240,000; Format: 32MS/32WS/32MD/32WD/32XD	(Thailand) Benyapa Aimsaard (Thailand) Nuntakarn Aimsaard	(Chinese Taipei) Hsu Ya-ching (Chinese Taipei) Sung Yu-hsuan
23 June	U.S. Open (Draw): Dates: 24 June – 29 June; Host: Council Bluffs, United States; Venue: Mid-America Center; Level: Super 300; Prize: $240,000; Format: 32MS/32WS/32MD/32WD/32XD	Score: 21–15, 21–15	
23 June	U.S. Open (Draw): Dates: 24 June – 29 June; Host: Council Bluffs, United States; Venue: Mid-America Center; Level: Super 300; Prize: $240,000; Format: 32MS/32WS/32MD/32WD/32XD	(Denmark) Rasmus Espersen (Denmark) Amalie Cecilie Kudsk	(Thailand) Ruttanapak Oupthong (Thailand) Jhenicha Sudjaipraparat
23 June	U.S. Open (Draw): Dates: 24 June – 29 June; Host: Council Bluffs, United States; Venue: Mid-America Center; Level: Super 300; Prize: $240,000; Format: 32MS/32WS/32MD/32WD/32XD	Score: 21–17, 13–21, 21–10	
23 June	Italian Open: Dates: 25 June – 29 June; Host: Bolzano, Italy; Venue: PalaResia; Level: International Series; Prize: $5,000; Format: 32MS/32WS/32MD/32WD/32XD	(Denmark) Ditlev Jæger Holm	(Malaysia) Lim Ming Hong
23 June	Italian Open: Dates: 25 June – 29 June; Host: Bolzano, Italy; Venue: PalaResia; Level: International Series; Prize: $5,000; Format: 32MS/32WS/32MD/32WD/32XD	Score: 21–13, 21–19	
23 June	Italian Open: Dates: 25 June – 29 June; Host: Bolzano, Italy; Venue: PalaResia; Level: International Series; Prize: $5,000; Format: 32MS/32WS/32MD/32WD/32XD	(Turkey) Özge Bayrak	(Bulgaria) Stefani Stoeva
23 June	Italian Open: Dates: 25 June – 29 June; Host: Bolzano, Italy; Venue: PalaResia; Level: International Series; Prize: $5,000; Format: 32MS/32WS/32MD/32WD/32XD	Score: 21–15, 21–19	
23 June	Italian Open: Dates: 25 June – 29 June; Host: Bolzano, Italy; Venue: PalaResia; Level: International Series; Prize: $5,000; Format: 32MS/32WS/32MD/32WD/32XD	(Spain) Daniel Franco (Spain) Rodrigo Sanjurjo	(England) Oliver Butler (England) Samuel Jones
23 June	Italian Open: Dates: 25 June – 29 June; Host: Bolzano, Italy; Venue: PalaResia; Level: International Series; Prize: $5,000; Format: 32MS/32WS/32MD/32WD/32XD	Score: 18–21, 21–16, 21–19	
23 June	Italian Open: Dates: 25 June – 29 June; Host: Bolzano, Italy; Venue: PalaResia; Level: International Series; Prize: $5,000; Format: 32MS/32WS/32MD/32WD/32XD	(Bulgaria) Gabriela Stoeva (Bulgaria) Stefani Stoeva	(Turkey) Bengisu Erçetin (Turkey) Nazlıcan İnci
23 June	Italian Open: Dates: 25 June – 29 June; Host: Bolzano, Italy; Venue: PalaResia; Level: International Series; Prize: $5,000; Format: 32MS/32WS/32MD/32WD/32XD	Score: 21–19, 21–14	
23 June	Italian Open: Dates: 25 June – 29 June; Host: Bolzano, Italy; Venue: PalaResia; Level: International Series; Prize: $5,000; Format: 32MS/32WS/32MD/32WD/32XD	(France) Thibault Gardon (France) Kathell Desmots-Chacun	(Turkey) Emre Sönmez (Turkey) Yasemen Bektaş
23 June	Italian Open: Dates: 25 June – 29 June; Host: Bolzano, Italy; Venue: PalaResia; Level: International Series; Prize: $5,000; Format: 32MS/32WS/32MD/32WD/32XD	Score: 18–21, 21–10, 21–16	

=== July ===
Week commencing	Tournament	Champions	Runners-up
30 June	Canada Open (Draw): Dates: 1 July – 6 July; Host: Markham, Canada; Venue: Markham Pan Am Centre; Level: Super 300; Prize: $240,000; Format: 32MS/32WS/32MD/32WD/32XD	(Japan) Kenta Nishimoto	(Canada) Victor Lai
30 June	Canada Open (Draw): Dates: 1 July – 6 July; Host: Markham, Canada; Venue: Markham Pan Am Centre; Level: Super 300; Prize: $240,000; Format: 32MS/32WS/32MD/32WD/32XD	Score: 21–13, 21–14	
30 June	Canada Open (Draw): Dates: 1 July – 6 July; Host: Markham, Canada; Venue: Markham Pan Am Centre; Level: Super 300; Prize: $240,000; Format: 32MS/32WS/32MD/32WD/32XD	(Japan) Manami Suizu	(Vietnam) Nguyễn Thùy Linh
30 June	Canada Open (Draw): Dates: 1 July – 6 July; Host: Markham, Canada; Venue: Markham Pan Am Centre; Level: Super 300; Prize: $240,000; Format: 32MS/32WS/32MD/32WD/32XD	Score: 21–12, 21–14	
30 June	Canada Open (Draw): Dates: 1 July – 6 July; Host: Markham, Canada; Venue: Markham Pan Am Centre; Level: Super 300; Prize: $240,000; Format: 32MS/32WS/32MD/32WD/32XD	(Chinese Taipei) Lee Fang-chih (Chinese Taipei) Lee Fang-jen	(Chinese Taipei) Chang Ko-chi (Chinese Taipei) Po Li-wei
30 June	Canada Open (Draw): Dates: 1 July – 6 July; Host: Markham, Canada; Venue: Markham Pan Am Centre; Level: Super 300; Prize: $240,000; Format: 32MS/32WS/32MD/32WD/32XD	Score: 21–19, 21–19	
30 June	Canada Open (Draw): Dates: 1 July – 6 July; Host: Markham, Canada; Venue: Markham Pan Am Centre; Level: Super 300; Prize: $240,000; Format: 32MS/32WS/32MD/32WD/32XD	(Thailand) Benyapa Aimsaard (Thailand) Nuntakarn Aimsaard	(Japan) Kaho Osawa (Japan) Mai Tanabe
30 June	Canada Open (Draw): Dates: 1 July – 6 July; Host: Markham, Canada; Venue: Markham Pan Am Centre; Level: Super 300; Prize: $240,000; Format: 32MS/32WS/32MD/32WD/32XD	Score: 21–12, 21–18	
30 June	Canada Open (Draw): Dates: 1 July – 6 July; Host: Markham, Canada; Venue: Markham Pan Am Centre; Level: Super 300; Prize: $240,000; Format: 32MS/32WS/32MD/32WD/32XD	(Thailand) Ruttanapak Oupthong (Thailand) Jhenicha Sudjaipraparat	(United States) Presley Smith (United States) Jennie Gai
30 June	Canada Open (Draw): Dates: 1 July – 6 July; Host: Markham, Canada; Venue: Markham Pan Am Centre; Level: Super 300; Prize: $240,000; Format: 32MS/32WS/32MD/32WD/32XD	Score: 21–14, 21–17	
30 June	Future Series Nouvelle-Aquitaine: Dates: 3 July – 6 July; Host: Pessac, France; Venue: Salle Bellegrave; Level: Future Series; Format: 32MS/32WS/32MD/32WD/32XD	(Malaysia) Lim Ming Hong	(Chinese Taipei) Huang Yu
30 June	Future Series Nouvelle-Aquitaine: Dates: 3 July – 6 July; Host: Pessac, France; Venue: Salle Bellegrave; Level: Future Series; Format: 32MS/32WS/32MD/32WD/32XD	Score: 22–20, 10–21, 21–16	
30 June	Future Series Nouvelle-Aquitaine: Dates: 3 July – 6 July; Host: Pessac, France; Venue: Salle Bellegrave; Level: Future Series; Format: 32MS/32WS/32MD/32WD/32XD	(India) Meghana Reddy	(Switzerland) Dounia Pelupessy
30 June	Future Series Nouvelle-Aquitaine: Dates: 3 July – 6 July; Host: Pessac, France; Venue: Salle Bellegrave; Level: Future Series; Format: 32MS/32WS/32MD/32WD/32XD	Score: 21–10, 21–14	
30 June	Future Series Nouvelle-Aquitaine: Dates: 3 July – 6 July; Host: Pessac, France; Venue: Salle Bellegrave; Level: Future Series; Format: 32MS/32WS/32MD/32WD/32XD	(Spain) Daniel Franco (Spain) Rodrigo Sanjurjo	(Germany) Marvin Datko (Germany) Aaron Sonnenschein
30 June	Future Series Nouvelle-Aquitaine: Dates: 3 July – 6 July; Host: Pessac, France; Venue: Salle Bellegrave; Level: Future Series; Format: 32MS/32WS/32MD/32WD/32XD	Score: 15–21, 21–13, 21–18	
30 June	Future Series Nouvelle-Aquitaine: Dates: 3 July – 6 July; Host: Pessac, France; Venue: Salle Bellegrave; Level: Future Series; Format: 32MS/32WS/32MD/32WD/32XD	(Spain) Nikol Carulla (Spain) Carmen Jiménez	(Bulgaria) Mihaela Chepisheva (Bulgaria) Tsvetina Popivanova
30 June	Future Series Nouvelle-Aquitaine: Dates: 3 July – 6 July; Host: Pessac, France; Venue: Salle Bellegrave; Level: Future Series; Format: 32MS/32WS/32MD/32WD/32XD	Score: 21–14, 21–19	
30 June	Future Series Nouvelle-Aquitaine: Dates: 3 July – 6 July; Host: Pessac, France; Venue: Salle Bellegrave; Level: Future Series; Format: 32MS/32WS/32MD/32WD/32XD	(Netherlands) Andy Buijk (Netherlands) Meerte Loos	(Malaysia) Lim Ming Hong (United States) Stella Pan
30 June	Future Series Nouvelle-Aquitaine: Dates: 3 July – 6 July; Host: Pessac, France; Venue: Salle Bellegrave; Level: Future Series; Format: 32MS/32WS/32MD/32WD/32XD	Score: 17–21, 21–19, 21–18	
14 July	Japan Open (Draw): Dates: 15 July – 20 July; Host: Tokyo, Japan; Venue: Tokyo Metropolitan Gymnasium; Level: Super 750; Prize: $950,000; Format: 32MS/32WS/32MD/32WD/32XD	(China) Shi Yuqi	(France) Alex Lanier
14 July	Japan Open (Draw): Dates: 15 July – 20 July; Host: Tokyo, Japan; Venue: Tokyo Metropolitan Gymnasium; Level: Super 750; Prize: $950,000; Format: 32MS/32WS/32MD/32WD/32XD	Score: 21–17, 21–15	
14 July	Japan Open (Draw): Dates: 15 July – 20 July; Host: Tokyo, Japan; Venue: Tokyo Metropolitan Gymnasium; Level: Super 750; Prize: $950,000; Format: 32MS/32WS/32MD/32WD/32XD	(South Korea) An Se-young	(China) Wang Zhiyi
14 July	Japan Open (Draw): Dates: 15 July – 20 July; Host: Tokyo, Japan; Venue: Tokyo Metropolitan Gymnasium; Level: Super 750; Prize: $950,000; Format: 32MS/32WS/32MD/32WD/32XD	Score: 21–12, 21–10	
14 July	Japan Open (Draw): Dates: 15 July – 20 July; Host: Tokyo, Japan; Venue: Tokyo Metropolitan Gymnasium; Level: Super 750; Prize: $950,000; Format: 32MS/32WS/32MD/32WD/32XD	(South Korea) Kim Won-ho (South Korea) Seo Seung-jae	(Malaysia) Goh Sze Fei (Malaysia) Nur Izzuddin
14 July	Japan Open (Draw): Dates: 15 July – 20 July; Host: Tokyo, Japan; Venue: Tokyo Metropolitan Gymnasium; Level: Super 750; Prize: $950,000; Format: 32MS/32WS/32MD/32WD/32XD	Score: 21–16, 21–17	
14 July	Japan Open (Draw): Dates: 15 July – 20 July; Host: Tokyo, Japan; Venue: Tokyo Metropolitan Gymnasium; Level: Super 750; Prize: $950,000; Format: 32MS/32WS/32MD/32WD/32XD	(China) Liu Shengshu (China) Tan Ning	(Malaysia) Pearly Tan (Malaysia) Thinaah Muralitharan
14 July	Japan Open (Draw): Dates: 15 July – 20 July; Host: Tokyo, Japan; Venue: Tokyo Metropolitan Gymnasium; Level: Super 750; Prize: $950,000; Format: 32MS/32WS/32MD/32WD/32XD	Score: 21–15, 21–14	
14 July	Japan Open (Draw): Dates: 15 July – 20 July; Host: Tokyo, Japan; Venue: Tokyo Metropolitan Gymnasium; Level: Super 750; Prize: $950,000; Format: 32MS/32WS/32MD/32WD/32XD	(China) Jiang Zhenbang (China) Wei Yaxin	(Thailand) Dechapol Puavaranukroh (Thailand) Supissara Paewsampran
14 July	Japan Open (Draw): Dates: 15 July – 20 July; Host: Tokyo, Japan; Venue: Tokyo Metropolitan Gymnasium; Level: Super 750; Prize: $950,000; Format: 32MS/32WS/32MD/32WD/32XD	Score: 21–19, 16–21, 21–15	
14 July	World University Games (Draw): Dates: 17 July – 20 July; Host: Mülheim, Germany; Venue: Westenergie Sporthalle; Level: Multi-Sport Games; Format: 21 teams	China	Chinese Taipei
14 July	World University Games (Draw): Dates: 17 July – 20 July; Host: Mülheim, Germany; Venue: Westenergie Sporthalle; Level: Multi-Sport Games; Format: 21 teams	Cui Hechen; Peng Jianqin	Chen Zhi-ray; Lin Yu-chieh
14 July	World University Games (Draw): Dates: 17 July – 20 July; Host: Mülheim, Germany; Venue: Westenergie Sporthalle; Level: Multi-Sport Games; Format: 21 teams	Yuan Anqi	Wang Pei-yu
14 July	World University Games (Draw): Dates: 17 July – 20 July; Host: Mülheim, Germany; Venue: Westenergie Sporthalle; Level: Multi-Sport Games; Format: 21 teams	Wang Zijun	Su Li-yang
14 July	World University Games (Draw): Dates: 17 July – 20 July; Host: Mülheim, Germany; Venue: Westenergie Sporthalle; Level: Multi-Sport Games; Format: 21 teams	Liu Jiayue; Wang Yiduo	Jheng Yu-chieh; Sung Yu-hsuan
14 July	World University Games (Draw): Dates: 17 July – 20 July; Host: Mülheim, Germany; Venue: Westenergie Sporthalle; Level: Multi-Sport Games; Format: 21 teams	Liao Pinyi; Li Qian	Chen Cheng-kuan; Hsu Yin-hui
14 July	World University Games (Draw): Dates: 17 July – 20 July; Host: Mülheim, Germany; Venue: Westenergie Sporthalle; Level: Multi-Sport Games; Format: 21 teams	Score: 3–1	
21 July	China Open (Draw): Dates: 22 July – 27 July; Host: Changzhou, Jiangsu, China; Venue: Changzhou Olympic Sports Centre; Level: Super 1000; Prize: $2,000,000; Format: 32MS/32WS/32MD/32WD/32XD	(China) Shi Yuqi	(China) Wang Zhengxing
21 July	China Open (Draw): Dates: 22 July – 27 July; Host: Changzhou, Jiangsu, China; Venue: Changzhou Olympic Sports Centre; Level: Super 1000; Prize: $2,000,000; Format: 32MS/32WS/32MD/32WD/32XD	Score: 14–21, 21–14, 21–15	
21 July	China Open (Draw): Dates: 22 July – 27 July; Host: Changzhou, Jiangsu, China; Venue: Changzhou Olympic Sports Centre; Level: Super 1000; Prize: $2,000,000; Format: 32MS/32WS/32MD/32WD/32XD	(China) Wang Zhiyi	(China) Han Yue
21 July	China Open (Draw): Dates: 22 July – 27 July; Host: Changzhou, Jiangsu, China; Venue: Changzhou Olympic Sports Centre; Level: Super 1000; Prize: $2,000,000; Format: 32MS/32WS/32MD/32WD/32XD	Score: 21–8, 21–13	
21 July	China Open (Draw): Dates: 22 July – 27 July; Host: Changzhou, Jiangsu, China; Venue: Changzhou Olympic Sports Centre; Level: Super 1000; Prize: $2,000,000; Format: 32MS/32WS/32MD/32WD/32XD	(Indonesia) Fajar Alfian (Indonesia) Muhammad Shohibul Fikri	(Malaysia) Aaron Chia (Malaysia) Soh Wooi Yik
21 July	China Open (Draw): Dates: 22 July – 27 July; Host: Changzhou, Jiangsu, China; Venue: Changzhou Olympic Sports Centre; Level: Super 1000; Prize: $2,000,000; Format: 32MS/32WS/32MD/32WD/32XD	Score: 21–15, 21–14	
21 July	China Open (Draw): Dates: 22 July – 27 July; Host: Changzhou, Jiangsu, China; Venue: Changzhou Olympic Sports Centre; Level: Super 1000; Prize: $2,000,000; Format: 32MS/32WS/32MD/32WD/32XD	(China) Liu Shengshu (China) Tan Ning	(China) Jia Yifan (China) Zhang Shuxian
21 July	China Open (Draw): Dates: 22 July – 27 July; Host: Changzhou, Jiangsu, China; Venue: Changzhou Olympic Sports Centre; Level: Super 1000; Prize: $2,000,000; Format: 32MS/32WS/32MD/32WD/32XD	Score: 24–22, 17–21, 21–14	
21 July	China Open (Draw): Dates: 22 July – 27 July; Host: Changzhou, Jiangsu, China; Venue: Changzhou Olympic Sports Centre; Level: Super 1000; Prize: $2,000,000; Format: 32MS/32WS/32MD/32WD/32XD	(China) Feng Yanzhe (China) Huang Dongping	(China) Jiang Zhenbang (China) Wei Yaxin
21 July	China Open (Draw): Dates: 22 July – 27 July; Host: Changzhou, Jiangsu, China; Venue: Changzhou Olympic Sports Centre; Level: Super 1000; Prize: $2,000,000; Format: 32MS/32WS/32MD/32WD/32XD	Score: 23–21, 21–17	
21 July	World University Games (Draw): Dates: 22 July – 26 July; Host: Mülheim, Germany; Venue: Westenergie Sporthalle; Level: Multi-Sport Games; Format: 128MS/128WS/64MD/64WD/64XD	(Chinese Taipei) Ting Yen-chen	(France) Enogat Roy
21 July	World University Games (Draw): Dates: 22 July – 26 July; Host: Mülheim, Germany; Venue: Westenergie Sporthalle; Level: Multi-Sport Games; Format: 128MS/128WS/64MD/64WD/64XD	Score: 15–8, 15–5	
21 July	World University Games (Draw): Dates: 22 July – 26 July; Host: Mülheim, Germany; Venue: Westenergie Sporthalle; Level: Multi-Sport Games; Format: 128MS/128WS/64MD/64WD/64XD	(Thailand) Thamonwan Nithiittikrai	(Thailand) Tidapron Kleebyeesun
21 July	World University Games (Draw): Dates: 22 July – 26 July; Host: Mülheim, Germany; Venue: Westenergie Sporthalle; Level: Multi-Sport Games; Format: 128MS/128WS/64MD/64WD/64XD	Score: 18–20, 15–7, 15–8	
21 July	World University Games (Draw): Dates: 22 July – 26 July; Host: Mülheim, Germany; Venue: Westenergie Sporthalle; Level: Multi-Sport Games; Format: 128MS/128WS/64MD/64WD/64XD	(South Korea) Jin Yong (South Korea) Lee Jong-min	(China) Cui Hechen (China) Peng Jianqin
21 July	World University Games (Draw): Dates: 22 July – 26 July; Host: Mülheim, Germany; Venue: Westenergie Sporthalle; Level: Multi-Sport Games; Format: 128MS/128WS/64MD/64WD/64XD	Score: 15–10, 15–10	
21 July	World University Games (Draw): Dates: 22 July – 26 July; Host: Mülheim, Germany; Venue: Westenergie Sporthalle; Level: Multi-Sport Games; Format: 128MS/128WS/64MD/64WD/64XD	(China) Li Qian (China) Wang Yiduo	(Chinese Taipei) Jheng Yu-chieh (Chinese Taipei) Sung Yu-hsuan
21 July	World University Games (Draw): Dates: 22 July – 26 July; Host: Mülheim, Germany; Venue: Westenergie Sporthalle; Level: Multi-Sport Games; Format: 128MS/128WS/64MD/64WD/64XD	Score: 15–8, 7–15, 15–9	
21 July	World University Games (Draw): Dates: 22 July – 26 July; Host: Mülheim, Germany; Venue: Westenergie Sporthalle; Level: Multi-Sport Games; Format: 128MS/128WS/64MD/64WD/64XD	(Chinese Taipei) Wu Hsuan-yi (Chinese Taipei) Yang Chu-yun	(Chinese Taipei) Chen Cheng-kuan (Chinese Taipei) Hsu Yin-hui
21 July	World University Games (Draw): Dates: 22 July – 26 July; Host: Mülheim, Germany; Venue: Westenergie Sporthalle; Level: Multi-Sport Games; Format: 128MS/128WS/64MD/64WD/64XD	Score:15–8, 17–15	
21 July	Bolivia International: Dates: 23 July – 27 July; Host: Sucre, Bolivia; Venue: Coliseo de Badminton Max Toledo; Level: Future Series; Format: 32MS/16WS/8MD/8WD/16XD	(Guatemala) Kevin Cordón	(Cuba) Roberto Herrera
21 July	Bolivia International: Dates: 23 July – 27 July; Host: Sucre, Bolivia; Venue: Coliseo de Badminton Max Toledo; Level: Future Series; Format: 32MS/16WS/8MD/8WD/16XD	Score: 21–11, 21–15	
21 July	Bolivia International: Dates: 23 July – 27 July; Host: Sucre, Bolivia; Venue: Coliseo de Badminton Max Toledo; Level: Future Series; Format: 32MS/16WS/8MD/8WD/16XD	(Mexico) Sabrina Solís	(Peru) Naomi Junco
21 July	Bolivia International: Dates: 23 July – 27 July; Host: Sucre, Bolivia; Venue: Coliseo de Badminton Max Toledo; Level: Future Series; Format: 32MS/16WS/8MD/8WD/16XD	Score: 21–17, 15–21, 21–16	
21 July	Bolivia International: Dates: 23 July – 27 July; Host: Sucre, Bolivia; Venue: Coliseo de Badminton Max Toledo; Level: Future Series; Format: 32MS/16WS/8MD/8WD/16XD	(Peru) Gonzalo Castillo (Peru) Sharum Durand	(Peru) Guillermo Buendía (Peru) Umesh Lescano
21 July	Bolivia International: Dates: 23 July – 27 July; Host: Sucre, Bolivia; Venue: Coliseo de Badminton Max Toledo; Level: Future Series; Format: 32MS/16WS/8MD/8WD/16XD	Score: 15–21, 21–17, 21–19	
21 July	Bolivia International: Dates: 23 July – 27 July; Host: Sucre, Bolivia; Venue: Coliseo de Badminton Max Toledo; Level: Future Series; Format: 32MS/16WS/8MD/8WD/16XD	(Cuba) Leyanis Contreras (Cuba) Taymara Oropesa	(Brazil) Luísa Bueno (Brazil) Maria Nascimento
21 July	Bolivia International: Dates: 23 July – 27 July; Host: Sucre, Bolivia; Venue: Coliseo de Badminton Max Toledo; Level: Future Series; Format: 32MS/16WS/8MD/8WD/16XD	Score: 21–18, 21–17	
21 July	Bolivia International: Dates: 23 July – 27 July; Host: Sucre, Bolivia; Venue: Coliseo de Badminton Max Toledo; Level: Future Series; Format: 32MS/16WS/8MD/8WD/16XD	(Peru) Sharum Durand (Peru) Namie Miyahira	(Cuba) Juan Bencomo (Cuba) Leyanis Contreras
21 July	Bolivia International: Dates: 23 July – 27 July; Host: Sucre, Bolivia; Venue: Coliseo de Badminton Max Toledo; Level: Future Series; Format: 32MS/16WS/8MD/8WD/16XD	Score: 21–14, 21–18	
28 July	Macau Open (Draw): Dates: 29 July – 3 August; Host: Macau, China; Venue: Macau East Asian Games Dome; Level: Super 300; Prize: $370,000; Format: 32MS/32WS/32MD/32WD/32XD	(Indonesia) Alwi Farhan	(Malaysia) Justin Hoh
28 July	Macau Open (Draw): Dates: 29 July – 3 August; Host: Macau, China; Venue: Macau East Asian Games Dome; Level: Super 300; Prize: $370,000; Format: 32MS/32WS/32MD/32WD/32XD	Score: 21–15, 21–5	
28 July	Macau Open (Draw): Dates: 29 July – 3 August; Host: Macau, China; Venue: Macau East Asian Games Dome; Level: Super 300; Prize: $370,000; Format: 32MS/32WS/32MD/32WD/32XD	(China) Chen Yufei	(Denmark) Line Christophersen
28 July	Macau Open (Draw): Dates: 29 July – 3 August; Host: Macau, China; Venue: Macau East Asian Games Dome; Level: Super 300; Prize: $370,000; Format: 32MS/32WS/32MD/32WD/32XD	Score: 21–17, 21–17	
28 July	Macau Open (Draw): Dates: 29 July – 3 August; Host: Macau, China; Venue: Macau East Asian Games Dome; Level: Super 300; Prize: $370,000; Format: 32MS/32WS/32MD/32WD/32XD	(Malaysia) Junaidi Arif (Malaysia) Yap Roy King	(Indonesia) Sabar Karyaman Gutama (Indonesia) Muhammad Reza Pahlevi Isfahani
28 July	Macau Open (Draw): Dates: 29 July – 3 August; Host: Macau, China; Venue: Macau East Asian Games Dome; Level: Super 300; Prize: $370,000; Format: 32MS/32WS/32MD/32WD/32XD	Score: 22–20, 21–18	
28 July	Macau Open (Draw): Dates: 29 July – 3 August; Host: Macau, China; Venue: Macau East Asian Games Dome; Level: Super 300; Prize: $370,000; Format: 32MS/32WS/32MD/32WD/32XD	(Chinese Taipei) Hsieh Pei-shan (Chinese Taipei) Hung En-tzu	(Japan) Kaho Osawa (Japan) Mai Tanabe
28 July	Macau Open (Draw): Dates: 29 July – 3 August; Host: Macau, China; Venue: Macau East Asian Games Dome; Level: Super 300; Prize: $370,000; Format: 32MS/32WS/32MD/32WD/32XD	Score: 21–18, 21–12	
28 July	Macau Open (Draw): Dates: 29 July – 3 August; Host: Macau, China; Venue: Macau East Asian Games Dome; Level: Super 300; Prize: $370,000; Format: 32MS/32WS/32MD/32WD/32XD	(Denmark) Mathias Christiansen (Denmark) Alexandra Bøje	(Malaysia) Jimmy Wong (Malaysia) Lai Pei Jing
28 July	Macau Open (Draw): Dates: 29 July – 3 August; Host: Macau, China; Venue: Macau East Asian Games Dome; Level: Super 300; Prize: $370,000; Format: 32MS/32WS/32MD/32WD/32XD	Score: 21–13, 21–16	

=== August ===
Week commencing	Tournament	Champions	Runners-up
4 August	Northern Marianas Open: Dates: 5 August – 10 August; Host: Saipan, Northern Mariana Islands; Venue: Gilbert C. Ada Gymnasium; Level: International Challenge; Prize: $17,500; Format: 64MS/32WS/32MD/16WD/16XD	(Japan) Yudai Okimoto	(South Korea) Kim Hae-deun
4 August	Northern Marianas Open: Dates: 5 August – 10 August; Host: Saipan, Northern Mariana Islands; Venue: Gilbert C. Ada Gymnasium; Level: International Challenge; Prize: $17,500; Format: 64MS/32WS/32MD/16WD/16XD	Score: 13–21, 21–15, 21–18	
4 August	Northern Marianas Open: Dates: 5 August – 10 August; Host: Saipan, Northern Mariana Islands; Venue: Gilbert C. Ada Gymnasium; Level: International Challenge; Prize: $17,500; Format: 64MS/32WS/32MD/16WD/16XD	(Japan) Sakura Masuki	(South Korea) Park Ga-eun
4 August	Northern Marianas Open: Dates: 5 August – 10 August; Host: Saipan, Northern Mariana Islands; Venue: Gilbert C. Ada Gymnasium; Level: International Challenge; Prize: $17,500; Format: 64MS/32WS/32MD/16WD/16XD	Score: 15–21, 21–11, 21–14	
4 August	Northern Marianas Open: Dates: 5 August – 10 August; Host: Saipan, Northern Mariana Islands; Venue: Gilbert C. Ada Gymnasium; Level: International Challenge; Prize: $17,500; Format: 64MS/32WS/32MD/16WD/16XD	(Japan) Kakeru Kumagai (Japan) Hiroki Nishi	(Japan) Haruki Kawabe (Japan) Kenta Matsukawa
4 August	Northern Marianas Open: Dates: 5 August – 10 August; Host: Saipan, Northern Mariana Islands; Venue: Gilbert C. Ada Gymnasium; Level: International Challenge; Prize: $17,500; Format: 64MS/32WS/32MD/16WD/16XD	Score: 21–15, 23–25, 21–13	
4 August	Northern Marianas Open: Dates: 5 August – 10 August; Host: Saipan, Northern Mariana Islands; Venue: Gilbert C. Ada Gymnasium; Level: International Challenge; Prize: $17,500; Format: 64MS/32WS/32MD/16WD/16XD	(Japan) Ririna Hiramoto (Japan) Kokona Ishikawa	(Japan) Hinata Suzuki (Japan) Nao Yamakita
4 August	Northern Marianas Open: Dates: 5 August – 10 August; Host: Saipan, Northern Mariana Islands; Venue: Gilbert C. Ada Gymnasium; Level: International Challenge; Prize: $17,500; Format: 64MS/32WS/32MD/16WD/16XD	Score: 21–17, 21–15	
4 August	Northern Marianas Open: Dates: 5 August – 10 August; Host: Saipan, Northern Mariana Islands; Venue: Gilbert C. Ada Gymnasium; Level: International Challenge; Prize: $17,500; Format: 64MS/32WS/32MD/16WD/16XD	(Japan) Akira Koga (Japan) Yuho Imai	(Japan) Haruki Kawabe (Japan) Kokona Ishikawa
4 August	Northern Marianas Open: Dates: 5 August – 10 August; Host: Saipan, Northern Mariana Islands; Venue: Gilbert C. Ada Gymnasium; Level: International Challenge; Prize: $17,500; Format: 64MS/32WS/32MD/16WD/16XD	Score: 21–19, 21–13	
4 August	Thailand International: Dates: 5 August – 10 August; Host: Nakhon Ratchasima, Thailand; Venue: Terminal Hall; Level: International Series; Prize: $5,000; Format: 128MS/64WS/64MD/64WD/64XD	(Indonesia) Christian Adinata	(Indonesia) Richie Duta Richardo
4 August	Thailand International: Dates: 5 August – 10 August; Host: Nakhon Ratchasima, Thailand; Venue: Terminal Hall; Level: International Series; Prize: $5,000; Format: 128MS/64WS/64MD/64WD/64XD	Score: 21–14, 21–19	
4 August	Thailand International: Dates: 5 August – 10 August; Host: Nakhon Ratchasima, Thailand; Venue: Terminal Hall; Level: International Series; Prize: $5,000; Format: 128MS/64WS/64MD/64WD/64XD	(Thailand) Tidapron Kleebyeesun	(South Korea) Yoo A-yeon
4 August	Thailand International: Dates: 5 August – 10 August; Host: Nakhon Ratchasima, Thailand; Venue: Terminal Hall; Level: International Series; Prize: $5,000; Format: 128MS/64WS/64MD/64WD/64XD	Score: 21–14, 23–21	
4 August	Thailand International: Dates: 5 August – 10 August; Host: Nakhon Ratchasima, Thailand; Venue: Terminal Hall; Level: International Series; Prize: $5,000; Format: 128MS/64WS/64MD/64WD/64XD	(Thailand) Narut Saengkham (Thailand) Apichasit Teerawiwat	(Japan) Masayuki Onodera (Japan) Daigo Tanioka
4 August	Thailand International: Dates: 5 August – 10 August; Host: Nakhon Ratchasima, Thailand; Venue: Terminal Hall; Level: International Series; Prize: $5,000; Format: 128MS/64WS/64MD/64WD/64XD	Score: 21–15, 21–17	
4 August	Thailand International: Dates: 5 August – 10 August; Host: Nakhon Ratchasima, Thailand; Venue: Terminal Hall; Level: International Series; Prize: $5,000; Format: 128MS/64WS/64MD/64WD/64XD	(Japan) Mikoto Aiso (Japan) Momoha Niimi	(Thailand) Atitaya Povanon (Thailand) Patida Srisawat
4 August	Thailand International: Dates: 5 August – 10 August; Host: Nakhon Ratchasima, Thailand; Venue: Terminal Hall; Level: International Series; Prize: $5,000; Format: 128MS/64WS/64MD/64WD/64XD	Score: 18–21, 21–18, 21–16	
4 August	Thailand International: Dates: 5 August – 10 August; Host: Nakhon Ratchasima, Thailand; Venue: Terminal Hall; Level: International Series; Prize: $5,000; Format: 128MS/64WS/64MD/64WD/64XD	(Malaysia) Wee Yee Hern (Malaysia) Chan Wen Tse	(Thailand) Ratchapol Makkasasithorn (Thailand) Nattamon Laisuan
4 August	Thailand International: Dates: 5 August – 10 August; Host: Nakhon Ratchasima, Thailand; Venue: Terminal Hall; Level: International Series; Prize: $5,000; Format: 128MS/64WS/64MD/64WD/64XD	Score: 22–20, 21–16	
11 August	Saipan International: Dates: 12 August – 16 August; Host: Saipan, Northern Mariana Islands; Venue: Gilbert C. Ada Gymnasium; Level: International Challenge; Prize: $17,500; Format: 64MS/32WS/32MD/8WD/16XD	(Japan) Riki Takei	(Japan) Yudai Okimoto
11 August	Saipan International: Dates: 12 August – 16 August; Host: Saipan, Northern Mariana Islands; Venue: Gilbert C. Ada Gymnasium; Level: International Challenge; Prize: $17,500; Format: 64MS/32WS/32MD/8WD/16XD	Score: 16–14, 15–4	
11 August	Saipan International: Dates: 12 August – 16 August; Host: Saipan, Northern Mariana Islands; Venue: Gilbert C. Ada Gymnasium; Level: International Challenge; Prize: $17,500; Format: 64MS/32WS/32MD/8WD/16XD	(India) Tanya Hemanth	(Japan) Kanae Sakai
11 August	Saipan International: Dates: 12 August – 16 August; Host: Saipan, Northern Mariana Islands; Venue: Gilbert C. Ada Gymnasium; Level: International Challenge; Prize: $17,500; Format: 64MS/32WS/32MD/8WD/16XD	Score: 15–10, 15–8	
11 August	Saipan International: Dates: 12 August – 16 August; Host: Saipan, Northern Mariana Islands; Venue: Gilbert C. Ada Gymnasium; Level: International Challenge; Prize: $17,500; Format: 64MS/32WS/32MD/8WD/16XD	(Japan) Naoya Kawashima (Japan) Akira Koga	(Japan) Haruki Kawabe (Japan) Kenta Matsukawa
11 August	Saipan International: Dates: 12 August – 16 August; Host: Saipan, Northern Mariana Islands; Venue: Gilbert C. Ada Gymnasium; Level: International Challenge; Prize: $17,500; Format: 64MS/32WS/32MD/8WD/16XD	Score: 15–13, 15–12	
11 August	Saipan International: Dates: 12 August – 16 August; Host: Saipan, Northern Mariana Islands; Venue: Gilbert C. Ada Gymnasium; Level: International Challenge; Prize: $17,500; Format: 64MS/32WS/32MD/8WD/16XD	(Japan) Hinata Suzuki (Japan) Nao Yamakita	(Japan) Nanako Hara (Japan) Riko Kiyose
11 August	Saipan International: Dates: 12 August – 16 August; Host: Saipan, Northern Mariana Islands; Venue: Gilbert C. Ada Gymnasium; Level: International Challenge; Prize: $17,500; Format: 64MS/32WS/32MD/8WD/16XD	Score: 15–13, 8–15, 15–11	
11 August	Saipan International: Dates: 12 August – 16 August; Host: Saipan, Northern Mariana Islands; Venue: Gilbert C. Ada Gymnasium; Level: International Challenge; Prize: $17,500; Format: 64MS/32WS/32MD/8WD/16XD	(South Korea) An Yun-seong (South Korea) Lee Yu-lim	(Japan) Kenta Matsukawa (Japan) Riko Kiyose
11 August	Saipan International: Dates: 12 August – 16 August; Host: Saipan, Northern Mariana Islands; Venue: Gilbert C. Ada Gymnasium; Level: International Challenge; Prize: $17,500; Format: 64MS/32WS/32MD/8WD/16XD	Score: 18–16, 15–12	
11 August	Malaysia International: Dates: 12 August – 17 August; Host: Perak, Malaysia; Venue: Arena Badminton Perak; Level: International Challenge; Prize: $18,000; Format: 64MS/32WS/32MD/32WD/32XD	(Malaysia) Eogene Ewe	(Malaysia) Lee Jan Jireh
11 August	Malaysia International: Dates: 12 August – 17 August; Host: Perak, Malaysia; Venue: Arena Badminton Perak; Level: International Challenge; Prize: $18,000; Format: 64MS/32WS/32MD/32WD/32XD	Score: 8–15, 15–7, 15–13	
11 August	Malaysia International: Dates: 12 August – 17 August; Host: Perak, Malaysia; Venue: Arena Badminton Perak; Level: International Challenge; Prize: $18,000; Format: 64MS/32WS/32MD/32WD/32XD	(India) Devika Sihag	(India) Isharani Baruah
11 August	Malaysia International: Dates: 12 August – 17 August; Host: Perak, Malaysia; Venue: Arena Badminton Perak; Level: International Challenge; Prize: $18,000; Format: 64MS/32WS/32MD/32WD/32XD	Score: 15–7, 15–12	
11 August	Malaysia International: Dates: 12 August – 17 August; Host: Perak, Malaysia; Venue: Arena Badminton Perak; Level: International Challenge; Prize: $18,000; Format: 64MS/32WS/32MD/32WD/32XD	(Japan) Keiichiro Matsui (Japan) Katsuki Tamate	(Malaysia) Muhammad Faiq (Malaysia) Lok Hong Quan
11 August	Malaysia International: Dates: 12 August – 17 August; Host: Perak, Malaysia; Venue: Arena Badminton Perak; Level: International Challenge; Prize: $18,000; Format: 64MS/32WS/32MD/32WD/32XD	Score: 15–7, 15–13	
11 August	Malaysia International: Dates: 12 August – 17 August; Host: Perak, Malaysia; Venue: Arena Badminton Perak; Level: International Challenge; Prize: $18,000; Format: 64MS/32WS/32MD/32WD/32XD	(South Korea) Jeon Jui (South Korea) Kim Ha-na	(Japan) Yuna Kato (Japan) Hina Osawa
11 August	Malaysia International: Dates: 12 August – 17 August; Host: Perak, Malaysia; Venue: Arena Badminton Perak; Level: International Challenge; Prize: $18,000; Format: 64MS/32WS/32MD/32WD/32XD	Score: 15–10, 15–10	
11 August	Malaysia International: Dates: 12 August – 17 August; Host: Perak, Malaysia; Venue: Arena Badminton Perak; Level: International Challenge; Prize: $18,000; Format: 64MS/32WS/32MD/32WD/32XD	(Malaysia) Tan Zhi Yang (Malaysia) Nicole Tan	(Indonesia) Kenzie Yoe (Indonesia) Luna Rianty Saffana
11 August	Malaysia International: Dates: 12 August – 17 August; Host: Perak, Malaysia; Venue: Arena Badminton Perak; Level: International Challenge; Prize: $18,000; Format: 64MS/32WS/32MD/32WD/32XD	Score: 16–14, 15–10	
11 August	Thailand International: Dates: 12 August – 17 August; Host: Nakhon Ratchasima, Thailand; Venue: Terminal Hall; Level: International Challenge; Prize: $17,500; Format: 128MS/64WS/64MD/64WD/64XD	(Indonesia) Richie Duta Richardo	(Indonesia) Christian Adinata
11 August	Thailand International: Dates: 12 August – 17 August; Host: Nakhon Ratchasima, Thailand; Venue: Terminal Hall; Level: International Challenge; Prize: $17,500; Format: 128MS/64WS/64MD/64WD/64XD	Score: 21–10, 21–9	
11 August	Thailand International: Dates: 12 August – 17 August; Host: Nakhon Ratchasima, Thailand; Venue: Terminal Hall; Level: International Challenge; Prize: $17,500; Format: 128MS/64WS/64MD/64WD/64XD	(Thailand) Anyapat Phichitpreechasak	(Japan) Sorano Yoshikawa
11 August	Thailand International: Dates: 12 August – 17 August; Host: Nakhon Ratchasima, Thailand; Venue: Terminal Hall; Level: International Challenge; Prize: $17,500; Format: 128MS/64WS/64MD/64WD/64XD	Score: 18–21, 21–19, 21–10	
11 August	Thailand International: Dates: 12 August – 17 August; Host: Nakhon Ratchasima, Thailand; Venue: Terminal Hall; Level: International Challenge; Prize: $17,500; Format: 128MS/64WS/64MD/64WD/64XD	(Indonesia) Ali Faathir Rayhan (Indonesia) Devin Artha Wahyudi	(Indonesia) Dexter Farrell (Indonesia) Wahyu Agung Prasetyo
11 August	Thailand International: Dates: 12 August – 17 August; Host: Nakhon Ratchasima, Thailand; Venue: Terminal Hall; Level: International Challenge; Prize: $17,500; Format: 128MS/64WS/64MD/64WD/64XD	Score: 21–5, 21–11	
11 August	Thailand International: Dates: 12 August – 17 August; Host: Nakhon Ratchasima, Thailand; Venue: Terminal Hall; Level: International Challenge; Prize: $17,500; Format: 128MS/64WS/64MD/64WD/64XD	(Japan) Sayaka Hirota (Japan) Maiko Kawazoe	(Japan) Mio Konegawa (Japan) An Uesugi
11 August	Thailand International: Dates: 12 August – 17 August; Host: Nakhon Ratchasima, Thailand; Venue: Terminal Hall; Level: International Challenge; Prize: $17,500; Format: 128MS/64WS/64MD/64WD/64XD	Score: 24–22, 21–17	
11 August	Thailand International: Dates: 12 August – 17 August; Host: Nakhon Ratchasima, Thailand; Venue: Terminal Hall; Level: International Challenge; Prize: $17,500; Format: 128MS/64WS/64MD/64WD/64XD	(Thailand) Phuwanat Horbanluekit (Thailand) Fungfa Korpthammakit	(Thailand) Ruttanapak Oupthong (Thailand) Sabrina Sophita Wedler
11 August	Thailand International: Dates: 12 August – 17 August; Host: Nakhon Ratchasima, Thailand; Venue: Terminal Hall; Level: International Challenge; Prize: $17,500; Format: 128MS/64WS/64MD/64WD/64XD	Score: 21–13, 21–12	
11 August	Ghana International: Dates: 13 August – 17 August; Host: Accra, Ghana; Venue: Borteyman Sports Complex; Level: International Series; Prize: $5,000; Format: 32MS/32WS/32MD/8WD/16XD	(Indonesia) Prahdiska Bagas Shujiwo	(Japan) Shun Saito
11 August	Ghana International: Dates: 13 August – 17 August; Host: Accra, Ghana; Venue: Borteyman Sports Complex; Level: International Series; Prize: $5,000; Format: 32MS/32WS/32MD/8WD/16XD	Score: 21–15, 21–18	
11 August	Ghana International: Dates: 13 August – 17 August; Host: Accra, Ghana; Venue: Borteyman Sports Complex; Level: International Series; Prize: $5,000; Format: 32MS/32WS/32MD/8WD/16XD	(Indonesia) Thalita Ramadhani Wiryawan	(India) Aalisha Naik
11 August	Ghana International: Dates: 13 August – 17 August; Host: Accra, Ghana; Venue: Borteyman Sports Complex; Level: International Series; Prize: $5,000; Format: 32MS/32WS/32MD/8WD/16XD	Score: 21–13, 21–11	
11 August	Ghana International: Dates: 13 August – 17 August; Host: Accra, Ghana; Venue: Borteyman Sports Complex; Level: International Series; Prize: $5,000; Format: 32MS/32WS/32MD/8WD/16XD	(Indonesia) Anselmus Prasetya (Indonesia) Pulung Ramadhan	(India) Abinash Mohanty (India) Ayush Pattanayak
11 August	Ghana International: Dates: 13 August – 17 August; Host: Accra, Ghana; Venue: Borteyman Sports Complex; Level: International Series; Prize: $5,000; Format: 32MS/32WS/32MD/8WD/16XD	Score: 21–11, 21–13	
11 August	Ghana International: Dates: 13 August – 17 August; Host: Accra, Ghana; Venue: Borteyman Sports Complex; Level: International Series; Prize: $5,000; Format: 32MS/32WS/32MD/8WD/16XD	(Indonesia) Isyana Syahira Meida (Indonesia) Rinjani Kwinara Nastine	(Indonesia) Nabila Cahya Permata Ayu (Indonesia) Nahya Muhyifa
11 August	Ghana International: Dates: 13 August – 17 August; Host: Accra, Ghana; Venue: Borteyman Sports Complex; Level: International Series; Prize: $5,000; Format: 32MS/32WS/32MD/8WD/16XD	Score: 22–20, 21–18	
11 August	Ghana International: Dates: 13 August – 17 August; Host: Accra, Ghana; Venue: Borteyman Sports Complex; Level: International Series; Prize: $5,000; Format: 32MS/32WS/32MD/8WD/16XD	(Indonesia) Bimo Prasetyo (Indonesia) Arlya Nabila Thesya Munggaran	(Indonesia) M. Nawaf Khoiriyansyah (Indonesia) Nahya Muhyifa
11 August	Ghana International: Dates: 13 August – 17 August; Host: Accra, Ghana; Venue: Borteyman Sports Complex; Level: International Series; Prize: $5,000; Format: 32MS/32WS/32MD/8WD/16XD	Score: 21–7, 21–18	
18 August	Cameroon International: Dates: 21 August – 24 August; Host: Yaoundé, Cameroon; Venue: Yaoundé Multipurpose Sports Complex; Level: International Challenge; Prize: $20,000; Format: 32MS/32WS/16MD/16WD/32XD	(Indonesia) Prahdiska Bagas Shujiwo	(Kazakhstan) Dmitriy Panarin
18 August	Cameroon International: Dates: 21 August – 24 August; Host: Yaoundé, Cameroon; Venue: Yaoundé Multipurpose Sports Complex; Level: International Challenge; Prize: $20,000; Format: 32MS/32WS/16MD/16WD/32XD	Score: 21–13, 21–7	
18 August	Cameroon International: Dates: 21 August – 24 August; Host: Yaoundé, Cameroon; Venue: Yaoundé Multipurpose Sports Complex; Level: International Challenge; Prize: $20,000; Format: 32MS/32WS/16MD/16WD/32XD	(Indonesia) Thalita Ramadhani Wiryawan	(India) Anmol Kharb
18 August	Cameroon International: Dates: 21 August – 24 August; Host: Yaoundé, Cameroon; Venue: Yaoundé Multipurpose Sports Complex; Level: International Challenge; Prize: $20,000; Format: 32MS/32WS/16MD/16WD/32XD	Score: 21–11, 21–19	
18 August	Cameroon International: Dates: 21 August – 24 August; Host: Yaoundé, Cameroon; Venue: Yaoundé Multipurpose Sports Complex; Level: International Challenge; Prize: $20,000; Format: 32MS/32WS/16MD/16WD/32XD	(India) Suraj Goala (India) Dhruv Rawat	(Japan) Akira Hanada (Japan) Shun Saito
18 August	Cameroon International: Dates: 21 August – 24 August; Host: Yaoundé, Cameroon; Venue: Yaoundé Multipurpose Sports Complex; Level: International Challenge; Prize: $20,000; Format: 32MS/32WS/16MD/16WD/32XD	Score: 21–14, 21–13	
18 August	Cameroon International: Dates: 21 August – 24 August; Host: Yaoundé, Cameroon; Venue: Yaoundé Multipurpose Sports Complex; Level: International Challenge; Prize: $20,000; Format: 32MS/32WS/16MD/16WD/32XD	(Indonesia) Isyana Syahira Meida (Indonesia) Rinjani Kwinara Nastine	(Indonesia) Nabila Cahya Permata Ayu (Indonesia) Nahya Muhyifa
18 August	Cameroon International: Dates: 21 August – 24 August; Host: Yaoundé, Cameroon; Venue: Yaoundé Multipurpose Sports Complex; Level: International Challenge; Prize: $20,000; Format: 32MS/32WS/16MD/16WD/32XD	Score: 21–15, 21–14	
18 August	Cameroon International: Dates: 21 August – 24 August; Host: Yaoundé, Cameroon; Venue: Yaoundé Multipurpose Sports Complex; Level: International Challenge; Prize: $20,000; Format: 32MS/32WS/16MD/16WD/32XD	(Indonesia) M. Nawaf Khoiriyansyah (Indonesia) Nahya Muhyifa	(Indonesia) Bimo Prasetyo (Indonesia) Arlya Nabila Thesya Munggaran
18 August	Cameroon International: Dates: 21 August – 24 August; Host: Yaoundé, Cameroon; Venue: Yaoundé Multipurpose Sports Complex; Level: International Challenge; Prize: $20,000; Format: 32MS/32WS/16MD/16WD/32XD	Score: 21–12, 11–21, 21–19	
25 August	World Championships (Draw): Dates: 25 August – 31 August; Host: Paris, France; Venue: Adidas Arena; Level: World Championships; Prize: N/A; Format: 64MS/64WS/48MD/48WD/48XD	(China) Shi Yuqi	(Thailand) Kunlavut Vitidsarn
25 August	World Championships (Draw): Dates: 25 August – 31 August; Host: Paris, France; Venue: Adidas Arena; Level: World Championships; Prize: N/A; Format: 64MS/64WS/48MD/48WD/48XD	Score: 19–21, 21–10, 21–18	
25 August	World Championships (Draw): Dates: 25 August – 31 August; Host: Paris, France; Venue: Adidas Arena; Level: World Championships; Prize: N/A; Format: 64MS/64WS/48MD/48WD/48XD	(Japan) Akane Yamaguchi	(China) Chen Yufei
25 August	World Championships (Draw): Dates: 25 August – 31 August; Host: Paris, France; Venue: Adidas Arena; Level: World Championships; Prize: N/A; Format: 64MS/64WS/48MD/48WD/48XD	Score: 21–9, 21–13	
25 August	World Championships (Draw): Dates: 25 August – 31 August; Host: Paris, France; Venue: Adidas Arena; Level: World Championships; Prize: N/A; Format: 64MS/64WS/48MD/48WD/48XD	(South Korea) Kim Won-ho (South Korea) Seo Seung-jae	(China) Chen Boyang (China) Liu Yi
25 August	World Championships (Draw): Dates: 25 August – 31 August; Host: Paris, France; Venue: Adidas Arena; Level: World Championships; Prize: N/A; Format: 64MS/64WS/48MD/48WD/48XD	Score: 21–17, 21–12	
25 August	World Championships (Draw): Dates: 25 August – 31 August; Host: Paris, France; Venue: Adidas Arena; Level: World Championships; Prize: N/A; Format: 64MS/64WS/48MD/48WD/48XD	(China) Liu Shengshu (China) Tan Ning	(Malaysia) Pearly Tan (Malaysia) Thinaah Muralitharan
25 August	World Championships (Draw): Dates: 25 August – 31 August; Host: Paris, France; Venue: Adidas Arena; Level: World Championships; Prize: N/A; Format: 64MS/64WS/48MD/48WD/48XD	Score: 21–14, 20–22, 21–17	
25 August	World Championships (Draw): Dates: 25 August – 31 August; Host: Paris, France; Venue: Adidas Arena; Level: World Championships; Prize: N/A; Format: 64MS/64WS/48MD/48WD/48XD	(Malaysia) Chen Tang Jie (Malaysia) Toh Ee Wei	(China) Jiang Zhenbang (China) Wei Yaxin
25 August	World Championships (Draw): Dates: 25 August – 31 August; Host: Paris, France; Venue: Adidas Arena; Level: World Championships; Prize: N/A; Format: 64MS/64WS/48MD/48WD/48XD	Score: 21–15, 21–14	
25 August	Lagos International: Dates: 27 August – 30 August; Host: Lagos, Nigeria; Venue: Teslim Balogun Stadium; Level: International Challenge; Prize: $17,500; Format: 32MS/32WS/16MD/16WD/16XD	(Indonesia) Prahdiska Bagas Shujiwo	(Japan) Minoru Koga
25 August	Lagos International: Dates: 27 August – 30 August; Host: Lagos, Nigeria; Venue: Teslim Balogun Stadium; Level: International Challenge; Prize: $17,500; Format: 32MS/32WS/16MD/16WD/16XD	Score: 21–17, 21–18	
25 August	Lagos International: Dates: 27 August – 30 August; Host: Lagos, Nigeria; Venue: Teslim Balogun Stadium; Level: International Challenge; Prize: $17,500; Format: 32MS/32WS/16MD/16WD/16XD	(India) Shreya Lele	(India) Aakarshi Kashyap
25 August	Lagos International: Dates: 27 August – 30 August; Host: Lagos, Nigeria; Venue: Teslim Balogun Stadium; Level: International Challenge; Prize: $17,500; Format: 32MS/32WS/16MD/16WD/16XD	Score: 21–15, 21–17	
25 August	Lagos International: Dates: 27 August – 30 August; Host: Lagos, Nigeria; Venue: Teslim Balogun Stadium; Level: International Challenge; Prize: $17,500; Format: 32MS/32WS/16MD/16WD/16XD	(Individual Neutral Athletes) Rodion Alimov (Individual Neutral Athletes) Maksim Ogloblin	(United Arab Emirates) P.S Ravikrishna (United Arab Emirates) Somi Romdhani
25 August	Lagos International: Dates: 27 August – 30 August; Host: Lagos, Nigeria; Venue: Teslim Balogun Stadium; Level: International Challenge; Prize: $17,500; Format: 32MS/32WS/16MD/16WD/16XD	Score: 21–15, 21–12	
25 August	Lagos International: Dates: 27 August – 30 August; Host: Lagos, Nigeria; Venue: Teslim Balogun Stadium; Level: International Challenge; Prize: $17,500; Format: 32MS/32WS/16MD/16WD/16XD	(Indonesia) Isyana Syahira Meida (Indonesia) Rinjani Kwinnara Nastine	(United Arab Emirates) Aleena Qathun (United Arab Emirates) Sreeyuktha Sreejith Parol
25 August	Lagos International: Dates: 27 August – 30 August; Host: Lagos, Nigeria; Venue: Teslim Balogun Stadium; Level: International Challenge; Prize: $17,500; Format: 32MS/32WS/16MD/16WD/16XD	Score: 21–18, 21–7	
25 August	Lagos International: Dates: 27 August – 30 August; Host: Lagos, Nigeria; Venue: Teslim Balogun Stadium; Level: International Challenge; Prize: $17,500; Format: 32MS/32WS/16MD/16WD/16XD	(Indonesia) Bimo Prasetyo (Indonesia) Arlya Nabila Thesya Munggaran	(India) Dhruv Rawat (India) K. Maneesha
25 August	Lagos International: Dates: 27 August – 30 August; Host: Lagos, Nigeria; Venue: Teslim Balogun Stadium; Level: International Challenge; Prize: $17,500; Format: 32MS/32WS/16MD/16WD/16XD	Score: 21–15, 21–17	
25 August	Mexico Future Series: Dates: 27 August – 31 August; Host: Aguascalientes, Mexico; Venue: Polifórum Deportivo y Cultural Universitario Morelos; Level: Future Series; Format: 32MS/32WS/32MD/32WD/32XD	(United States) Mark Alcala	(Guatemala) Yeison del Cid
25 August	Mexico Future Series: Dates: 27 August – 31 August; Host: Aguascalientes, Mexico; Venue: Polifórum Deportivo y Cultural Universitario Morelos; Level: Future Series; Format: 32MS/32WS/32MD/32WD/32XD	Score: 21–8, 21–18	
25 August	Mexico Future Series: Dates: 27 August – 31 August; Host: Aguascalientes, Mexico; Venue: Polifórum Deportivo y Cultural Universitario Morelos; Level: Future Series; Format: 32MS/32WS/32MD/32WD/32XD	(United States) Ella Lin	(Guatemala) Nikté Sotomayor
25 August	Mexico Future Series: Dates: 27 August – 31 August; Host: Aguascalientes, Mexico; Venue: Polifórum Deportivo y Cultural Universitario Morelos; Level: Future Series; Format: 32MS/32WS/32MD/32WD/32XD	Score: 21–13, 21–14	
25 August	Mexico Future Series: Dates: 27 August – 31 August; Host: Aguascalientes, Mexico; Venue: Polifórum Deportivo y Cultural Universitario Morelos; Level: Future Series; Format: 32MS/32WS/32MD/32WD/32XD	(Denmark) Emil Langemark (Denmark) Mikkel Langemark	(Mexico) Edwin García (Mexico) Irving Pérez
25 August	Mexico Future Series: Dates: 27 August – 31 August; Host: Aguascalientes, Mexico; Venue: Polifórum Deportivo y Cultural Universitario Morelos; Level: Future Series; Format: 32MS/32WS/32MD/32WD/32XD	Score: 21–10, 21–13	
25 August	Mexico Future Series: Dates: 27 August – 31 August; Host: Aguascalientes, Mexico; Venue: Polifórum Deportivo y Cultural Universitario Morelos; Level: Future Series; Format: 32MS/32WS/32MD/32WD/32XD	(Canada) Eyota Kwan (Canada) Johnna Rymes	(Mexico) Cecilia Madera (Mexico) Isabella Puente
25 August	Mexico Future Series: Dates: 27 August – 31 August; Host: Aguascalientes, Mexico; Venue: Polifórum Deportivo y Cultural Universitario Morelos; Level: Future Series; Format: 32MS/32WS/32MD/32WD/32XD	Score: 19–21, 21–17, 21–16	
25 August	Mexico Future Series: Dates: 27 August – 31 August; Host: Aguascalientes, Mexico; Venue: Polifórum Deportivo y Cultural Universitario Morelos; Level: Future Series; Format: 32MS/32WS/32MD/32WD/32XD	(United States) Adrian Mar (United States) Ella Lin	(Mexico) Edwin García (Mexico) Cecilia Madera
25 August	Mexico Future Series: Dates: 27 August – 31 August; Host: Aguascalientes, Mexico; Venue: Polifórum Deportivo y Cultural Universitario Morelos; Level: Future Series; Format: 32MS/32WS/32MD/32WD/32XD	Score: 21–11, 21–12	

=== September ===
Week commencing	Tournament	Champions	Runners-up
1 September	Baoji China Masters (Draw): Dates: 2 September – 7 September; Host: Baoji, Shaanxi, China; Venue: Baoji City Gymnasium; Level: Super 100; Prize: $110,000; Format: 48MS/32WS/32MD/32WD/32XD	(China) Sun Chao	(China) Hu Zhe'an
1 September	Baoji China Masters (Draw): Dates: 2 September – 7 September; Host: Baoji, Shaanxi, China; Venue: Baoji City Gymnasium; Level: Super 100; Prize: $110,000; Format: 48MS/32WS/32MD/32WD/32XD	Score: 23–21, 22–20	
1 September	Baoji China Masters (Draw): Dates: 2 September – 7 September; Host: Baoji, Shaanxi, China; Venue: Baoji City Gymnasium; Level: Super 100; Prize: $110,000; Format: 48MS/32WS/32MD/32WD/32XD	(Thailand) Pitchamon Opatniputh	(China) Zheng Xinyan
1 September	Baoji China Masters (Draw): Dates: 2 September – 7 September; Host: Baoji, Shaanxi, China; Venue: Baoji City Gymnasium; Level: Super 100; Prize: $110,000; Format: 48MS/32WS/32MD/32WD/32XD	Score: 21–16, 18–21, 21–7	
1 September	Baoji China Masters (Draw): Dates: 2 September – 7 September; Host: Baoji, Shaanxi, China; Venue: Baoji City Gymnasium; Level: Super 100; Prize: $110,000; Format: 48MS/32WS/32MD/32WD/32XD	(China) Hu Keyuan (China) Lin Xiangyi	(China) Deng Haoxuan (China) Xu Jiajun
1 September	Baoji China Masters (Draw): Dates: 2 September – 7 September; Host: Baoji, Shaanxi, China; Venue: Baoji City Gymnasium; Level: Super 100; Prize: $110,000; Format: 48MS/32WS/32MD/32WD/32XD	Score: 21–13, 21–17	
1 September	Baoji China Masters (Draw): Dates: 2 September – 7 September; Host: Baoji, Shaanxi, China; Venue: Baoji City Gymnasium; Level: Super 100; Prize: $110,000; Format: 48MS/32WS/32MD/32WD/32XD	(China) Luo Yi (China) Wang Tingge	(China) Qiao Shijun (China) Zheng Yu
1 September	Baoji China Masters (Draw): Dates: 2 September – 7 September; Host: Baoji, Shaanxi, China; Venue: Baoji City Gymnasium; Level: Super 100; Prize: $110,000; Format: 48MS/32WS/32MD/32WD/32XD	Score: 17–21, 23–21, 21–15	
1 September	Baoji China Masters (Draw): Dates: 2 September – 7 September; Host: Baoji, Shaanxi, China; Venue: Baoji City Gymnasium; Level: Super 100; Prize: $110,000; Format: 48MS/32WS/32MD/32WD/32XD	(Thailand) Ruttanapak Oupthong (Thailand) Benyapa Aimsaard	(China) Zhu Yijun (China) Li Qian
1 September	Baoji China Masters (Draw): Dates: 2 September – 7 September; Host: Baoji, Shaanxi, China; Venue: Baoji City Gymnasium; Level: Super 100; Prize: $110,000; Format: 48MS/32WS/32MD/32WD/32XD	Score: 21–17, 21–16	
1 September	Guatemala Future Series: Dates: 2 September – 7 September; Host: Guatemala City, Guatemala; Venue: Coliseo Deportivo; Level: Future Series; Format: 32MS/32WS/16MD/16WD/32XD	(Guatemala) Kevin Cordón	(United States) Mark Alcala
1 September	Guatemala Future Series: Dates: 2 September – 7 September; Host: Guatemala City, Guatemala; Venue: Coliseo Deportivo; Level: Future Series; Format: 32MS/32WS/16MD/16WD/32XD	Score: 21–18, 21–14	
1 September	Guatemala Future Series: Dates: 2 September – 7 September; Host: Guatemala City, Guatemala; Venue: Coliseo Deportivo; Level: Future Series; Format: 32MS/32WS/16MD/16WD/32XD	(Colombia) Juliana Giraldo	(United States) Ruhi Raju
1 September	Guatemala Future Series: Dates: 2 September – 7 September; Host: Guatemala City, Guatemala; Venue: Coliseo Deportivo; Level: Future Series; Format: 32MS/32WS/16MD/16WD/32XD	Score: 21–10, 21–15	
1 September	Guatemala Future Series: Dates: 2 September – 7 September; Host: Guatemala City, Guatemala; Venue: Coliseo Deportivo; Level: Future Series; Format: 32MS/32WS/16MD/16WD/32XD	(Denmark) Emil Langemark (Denmark) Mikkel Langemark	(Guatemala) Christopher Martínez (Guatemala) Jonathan Solís
1 September	Guatemala Future Series: Dates: 2 September – 7 September; Host: Guatemala City, Guatemala; Venue: Coliseo Deportivo; Level: Future Series; Format: 32MS/32WS/16MD/16WD/32XD	Score: 21–13, 15–21, 21–16	
1 September	Guatemala Future Series: Dates: 2 September – 7 September; Host: Guatemala City, Guatemala; Venue: Coliseo Deportivo; Level: Future Series; Format: 32MS/32WS/16MD/16WD/32XD	(Guatemala) Diana Corleto (Guatemala) Nikté Sotomayor	(Dominican Republic) Clarisa Pie (Dominican Republic) Nairoby Jiménez
1 September	Guatemala Future Series: Dates: 2 September – 7 September; Host: Guatemala City, Guatemala; Venue: Coliseo Deportivo; Level: Future Series; Format: 32MS/32WS/16MD/16WD/32XD	Score: 21–13, 21–12	
1 September	Guatemala Future Series: Dates: 2 September – 7 September; Host: Guatemala City, Guatemala; Venue: Coliseo Deportivo; Level: Future Series; Format: 32MS/32WS/16MD/16WD/32XD	(Guatemala) Christopher Martínez (Guatemala) Diana Corleto	(Argentina) Nicolas Oliva (Argentina) Ailén Oliva
1 September	Guatemala Future Series: Dates: 2 September – 7 September; Host: Guatemala City, Guatemala; Venue: Coliseo Deportivo; Level: Future Series; Format: 32MS/32WS/16MD/16WD/32XD	Score: 21–8, 21–8	
1 September	Slovenia Future Series: Dates: 2 September – 5 September; Host: Laško, Slovenia; Venue: Sport hall Tri Lilije; Level: Future Series; Format: 48MS/48WS/24MD/24WD/32XD	(Japan) Minoru Koga	(England) Cholan Kayan
1 September	Slovenia Future Series: Dates: 2 September – 5 September; Host: Laško, Slovenia; Venue: Sport hall Tri Lilije; Level: Future Series; Format: 48MS/48WS/24MD/24WD/32XD	Score: 21–17, 24–22	
1 September	Slovenia Future Series: Dates: 2 September – 5 September; Host: Laško, Slovenia; Venue: Sport hall Tri Lilije; Level: Future Series; Format: 48MS/48WS/24MD/24WD/32XD	(Israel) Heli Neiman	(Croatia) Jelena Buchberger
1 September	Slovenia Future Series: Dates: 2 September – 5 September; Host: Laško, Slovenia; Venue: Sport hall Tri Lilije; Level: Future Series; Format: 48MS/48WS/24MD/24WD/32XD	Score: 22–20, 21–16	
1 September	Slovenia Future Series: Dates: 2 September – 5 September; Host: Laško, Slovenia; Venue: Sport hall Tri Lilije; Level: Future Series; Format: 48MS/48WS/24MD/24WD/32XD	(Germany) Marvin Datko (Germany) Aaron Sonnenschein	(Netherlands) Noah Haase (Netherlands) Joep Strooper
1 September	Slovenia Future Series: Dates: 2 September – 5 September; Host: Laško, Slovenia; Venue: Sport hall Tri Lilije; Level: Future Series; Format: 48MS/48WS/24MD/24WD/32XD	Score: 22–20, 21–14	
1 September	Slovenia Future Series: Dates: 2 September – 5 September; Host: Laško, Slovenia; Venue: Sport hall Tri Lilije; Level: Future Series; Format: 48MS/48WS/24MD/24WD/32XD	(Czech Republic) KateřIna Osladilová (Czech Republic) Sharleen van Coppenolle	(Switzerland) Lucie Amiguet (Switzerland) Caroline Racloz
1 September	Slovenia Future Series: Dates: 2 September – 5 September; Host: Laško, Slovenia; Venue: Sport hall Tri Lilije; Level: Future Series; Format: 48MS/48WS/24MD/24WD/32XD	Score: 12–21, 21–18, 22–20	
1 September	Slovenia Future Series: Dates: 2 September – 5 September; Host: Laško, Slovenia; Venue: Sport hall Tri Lilije; Level: Future Series; Format: 48MS/48WS/24MD/24WD/32XD	(Slovenia) Miha Ivančič (Slovenia) Petra Polanc	(Switzerland) Yann Orteu (Switzerland) Caroline Racloz
1 September	Slovenia Future Series: Dates: 2 September – 5 September; Host: Laško, Slovenia; Venue: Sport hall Tri Lilije; Level: Future Series; Format: 48MS/48WS/24MD/24WD/32XD	Score: 21–13, 16–21, 21–13	
1 September	Iran International Khazar (Caspian) Cup: Dates: 3 September – 6 September; Host: Bandar-e Anzali, Iran; Venue: Anzali Sports Complex; Level: Future Series; Format: 32MS/32WS/16MD/16WD/8XD	(Kazakhstan) Dmitriy Panarin	(Iran) Ali Hayati
1 September	Iran International Khazar (Caspian) Cup: Dates: 3 September – 6 September; Host: Bandar-e Anzali, Iran; Venue: Anzali Sports Complex; Level: Future Series; Format: 32MS/32WS/16MD/16WD/8XD	Score: 15–12, 15–6	
1 September	Iran International Khazar (Caspian) Cup: Dates: 3 September – 6 September; Host: Bandar-e Anzali, Iran; Venue: Anzali Sports Complex; Level: Future Series; Format: 32MS/32WS/16MD/16WD/8XD	(Iran) Paria Eskandari	(Iran) Mobina Nedaei
1 September	Iran International Khazar (Caspian) Cup: Dates: 3 September – 6 September; Host: Bandar-e Anzali, Iran; Venue: Anzali Sports Complex; Level: Future Series; Format: 32MS/32WS/16MD/16WD/8XD	Score: 15–12, 15–11	
1 September	Iran International Khazar (Caspian) Cup: Dates: 3 September – 6 September; Host: Bandar-e Anzali, Iran; Venue: Anzali Sports Complex; Level: Future Series; Format: 32MS/32WS/16MD/16WD/8XD	(Iran) Mehdi Ansari (Iran) Amirhossein Hasani	(Iran) Ali Hayati (Iran) Farzin Khanjani
1 September	Iran International Khazar (Caspian) Cup: Dates: 3 September – 6 September; Host: Bandar-e Anzali, Iran; Venue: Anzali Sports Complex; Level: Future Series; Format: 32MS/32WS/16MD/16WD/8XD	Score: 11–15, 15–13, 15–12	
1 September	Iran International Khazar (Caspian) Cup: Dates: 3 September – 6 September; Host: Bandar-e Anzali, Iran; Venue: Anzali Sports Complex; Level: Future Series; Format: 32MS/32WS/16MD/16WD/8XD	(Iran) Artina Aghapour Hasiri (Iran) Hana Molakarimi	(Iran) Paria Eskandari (Iran) Romina Tajik
1 September	Iran International Khazar (Caspian) Cup: Dates: 3 September – 6 September; Host: Bandar-e Anzali, Iran; Venue: Anzali Sports Complex; Level: Future Series; Format: 32MS/32WS/16MD/16WD/8XD	Score: 8–15, 15–13, 15–13	
1 September	Iran International Khazar (Caspian) Cup: Dates: 3 September – 6 September; Host: Bandar-e Anzali, Iran; Venue: Anzali Sports Complex; Level: Future Series; Format: 32MS/32WS/16MD/16WD/8XD	(Kazakhstan) Dmitriy Panarin (Kazakhstan) Nargiza Rakhmetullayeva	(Azerbaijan) Ulvi Huseynov (Azerbaijan) Leyla Jamalzade
1 September	Iran International Khazar (Caspian) Cup: Dates: 3 September – 6 September; Host: Bandar-e Anzali, Iran; Venue: Anzali Sports Complex; Level: Future Series; Format: 32MS/32WS/16MD/16WD/8XD	Score: 15–13, 15–11	
8 September	Hong Kong Open (Draw): Dates: 9 September – 14 September; Host: Hong Kong, China; Venue: Hong Kong Coliseum; Level: Super 500; Prize: $500,000; Format: 32MS/32WS/32MD/32WD/32XD	(China) Li Shifeng	(India) Lakshya Sen
8 September	Hong Kong Open (Draw): Dates: 9 September – 14 September; Host: Hong Kong, China; Venue: Hong Kong Coliseum; Level: Super 500; Prize: $500,000; Format: 32MS/32WS/32MD/32WD/32XD	Score: 21–15, 21–12	
8 September	Hong Kong Open (Draw): Dates: 9 September – 14 September; Host: Hong Kong, China; Venue: Hong Kong Coliseum; Level: Super 500; Prize: $500,000; Format: 32MS/32WS/32MD/32WD/32XD	(China) Wang Zhiyi	(China) Han Yue
8 September	Hong Kong Open (Draw): Dates: 9 September – 14 September; Host: Hong Kong, China; Venue: Hong Kong Coliseum; Level: Super 500; Prize: $500,000; Format: 32MS/32WS/32MD/32WD/32XD	Score: 21–14, 24–22	
8 September	Hong Kong Open (Draw): Dates: 9 September – 14 September; Host: Hong Kong, China; Venue: Hong Kong Coliseum; Level: Super 500; Prize: $500,000; Format: 32MS/32WS/32MD/32WD/32XD	(China) Liang Weikeng (China) Wang Chang	(India) Satwiksairaj Rankireddy (India) Chirag Shetty
8 September	Hong Kong Open (Draw): Dates: 9 September – 14 September; Host: Hong Kong, China; Venue: Hong Kong Coliseum; Level: Super 500; Prize: $500,000; Format: 32MS/32WS/32MD/32WD/32XD	Score: 19–21, 21–14, 21–17	
8 September	Hong Kong Open (Draw): Dates: 9 September – 14 September; Host: Hong Kong, China; Venue: Hong Kong Coliseum; Level: Super 500; Prize: $500,000; Format: 32MS/32WS/32MD/32WD/32XD	(China) Jia Yifan (China) Zhang Shuxian	(Japan) Rin Iwanaga (Japan) Kie Nakanishi
8 September	Hong Kong Open (Draw): Dates: 9 September – 14 September; Host: Hong Kong, China; Venue: Hong Kong Coliseum; Level: Super 500; Prize: $500,000; Format: 32MS/32WS/32MD/32WD/32XD	Score: 21–17, 21–15	
8 September	Hong Kong Open (Draw): Dates: 9 September – 14 September; Host: Hong Kong, China; Venue: Hong Kong Coliseum; Level: Super 500; Prize: $500,000; Format: 32MS/32WS/32MD/32WD/32XD	(China) Feng Yanzhe (China) Huang Dongping	(China) Guo Xinwa (China) Chen Fanghui
8 September	Hong Kong Open (Draw): Dates: 9 September – 14 September; Host: Hong Kong, China; Venue: Hong Kong Coliseum; Level: Super 500; Prize: $500,000; Format: 32MS/32WS/32MD/32WD/32XD	Score: 21–14, 21–14	
8 September	Vietnam Open (Draw): Dates: 9 September – 14 September; Host: Ho Chi Minh City, Vietnam; Venue: Nguyen Du Club; Level: Super 100; Prize: $110,000; Format: 48MS/32WS/32MD/32WD/32XD	(Thailand) Panitchaphon Teeraratsakul	(France) Arnaud Merklé
8 September	Vietnam Open (Draw): Dates: 9 September – 14 September; Host: Ho Chi Minh City, Vietnam; Venue: Nguyen Du Club; Level: Super 100; Prize: $110,000; Format: 48MS/32WS/32MD/32WD/32XD	Score: 21–16, 21–10	
8 September	Vietnam Open (Draw): Dates: 9 September – 14 September; Host: Ho Chi Minh City, Vietnam; Venue: Nguyen Du Club; Level: Super 100; Prize: $110,000; Format: 48MS/32WS/32MD/32WD/32XD	(China) Cai Yanyan	(Vietnam) Nguyễn Thùy Linh
8 September	Vietnam Open (Draw): Dates: 9 September – 14 September; Host: Ho Chi Minh City, Vietnam; Venue: Nguyen Du Club; Level: Super 100; Prize: $110,000; Format: 48MS/32WS/32MD/32WD/32XD	Score: 21–17, 23–21	
8 September	Vietnam Open (Draw): Dates: 9 September – 14 September; Host: Ho Chi Minh City, Vietnam; Venue: Nguyen Du Club; Level: Super 100; Prize: $110,000; Format: 48MS/32WS/32MD/32WD/32XD	(South Korea) Jin Yong (South Korea) Na Sung-seung	(China) Chen Xujun (China) Guo Ruohan
8 September	Vietnam Open (Draw): Dates: 9 September – 14 September; Host: Ho Chi Minh City, Vietnam; Venue: Nguyen Du Club; Level: Super 100; Prize: $110,000; Format: 48MS/32WS/32MD/32WD/32XD	Score: 21–10, 21–14	
8 September	Vietnam Open (Draw): Dates: 9 September – 14 September; Host: Ho Chi Minh City, Vietnam; Venue: Nguyen Du Club; Level: Super 100; Prize: $110,000; Format: 48MS/32WS/32MD/32WD/32XD	(China) Luo Yi (China) Wang Tingge	(China) Liu Jiayue (China) Wang Yiduo
8 September	Vietnam Open (Draw): Dates: 9 September – 14 September; Host: Ho Chi Minh City, Vietnam; Venue: Nguyen Du Club; Level: Super 100; Prize: $110,000; Format: 48MS/32WS/32MD/32WD/32XD	Score: 21–15, 21–17	
8 September	Vietnam Open (Draw): Dates: 9 September – 14 September; Host: Ho Chi Minh City, Vietnam; Venue: Nguyen Du Club; Level: Super 100; Prize: $110,000; Format: 48MS/32WS/32MD/32WD/32XD	(Indonesia) Marwan Faza (Indonesia) Aisyah Salsabila Putri Pranata	(China) Liao Pinyi (China) Tang Ruizhi
8 September	Vietnam Open (Draw): Dates: 9 September – 14 September; Host: Ho Chi Minh City, Vietnam; Venue: Nguyen Du Club; Level: Super 100; Prize: $110,000; Format: 48MS/32WS/32MD/32WD/32XD	Score: 21–16, 21–14	
8 September	Belgian International: Dates: 10 September – 13 September; Host: Leuven, Belgium; Venue: SportOase Leuven; Level: International Challenge; Prize: $20,000; Format: 32MS/32WS/24MD/24WD/24XD	(Japan) Minoru Koga	(Belgium) Julien Carraggi
8 September	Belgian International: Dates: 10 September – 13 September; Host: Leuven, Belgium; Venue: SportOase Leuven; Level: International Challenge; Prize: $20,000; Format: 32MS/32WS/24MD/24WD/24XD	Score: 21–14, 22–20	
8 September	Belgian International: Dates: 10 September – 13 September; Host: Leuven, Belgium; Venue: SportOase Leuven; Level: International Challenge; Prize: $20,000; Format: 32MS/32WS/24MD/24WD/24XD	(Bulgaria) Kaloyana Nalbantova	(Chinese Taipei) Peng Yu-wei
8 September	Belgian International: Dates: 10 September – 13 September; Host: Leuven, Belgium; Venue: SportOase Leuven; Level: International Challenge; Prize: $20,000; Format: 32MS/32WS/24MD/24WD/24XD	Score: 21–8, 13–21, 21–12	
8 September	Belgian International: Dates: 10 September – 13 September; Host: Leuven, Belgium; Venue: SportOase Leuven; Level: International Challenge; Prize: $20,000; Format: 32MS/32WS/24MD/24WD/24XD	(Denmark) Kristoffer Kolding (Denmark) Calvin Lundsgaard	(Scotland) Alexander Dunn (Scotland) Adam Pringle
8 September	Belgian International: Dates: 10 September – 13 September; Host: Leuven, Belgium; Venue: SportOase Leuven; Level: International Challenge; Prize: $20,000; Format: 32MS/32WS/24MD/24WD/24XD	Score: 21–18, 21–18	
8 September	Belgian International: Dates: 10 September – 13 September; Host: Leuven, Belgium; Venue: SportOase Leuven; Level: International Challenge; Prize: $20,000; Format: 32MS/32WS/24MD/24WD/24XD	(Bulgaria) Gabriela Stoeva (Bulgaria) Stefani Stoeva	(Scotland) Julie MacPherson (Scotland) Ciara Torrance
8 September	Belgian International: Dates: 10 September – 13 September; Host: Leuven, Belgium; Venue: SportOase Leuven; Level: International Challenge; Prize: $20,000; Format: 32MS/32WS/24MD/24WD/24XD	Score: 21–14, 21–12	
8 September	Belgian International: Dates: 10 September – 13 September; Host: Leuven, Belgium; Venue: SportOase Leuven; Level: International Challenge; Prize: $20,000; Format: 32MS/32WS/24MD/24WD/24XD	(Denmark) Rasmus Espersen (Denmark) Amalie Cecilie Kudsk	(Germany) Simon Krax (Germany) Amelie Lehmann
8 September	Belgian International: Dates: 10 September – 13 September; Host: Leuven, Belgium; Venue: SportOase Leuven; Level: International Challenge; Prize: $20,000; Format: 32MS/32WS/24MD/24WD/24XD	Score: 21–9, 21–17	
8 September	Malaysia International: Dates: 9 September – 14 September; Host: Johor, Malaysia; Venue: EduCity Sports Complex; Level: International Series; Prize: $8,000; Format: 64MS/32WS/32MD/32WD/32XD	(South Korea) Park Sang-yong	(Indonesia) Christian Adinata
8 September	Malaysia International: Dates: 9 September – 14 September; Host: Johor, Malaysia; Venue: EduCity Sports Complex; Level: International Series; Prize: $8,000; Format: 64MS/32WS/32MD/32WD/32XD	Score: 25–23, 20–22, 21–12	
8 September	Malaysia International: Dates: 9 September – 14 September; Host: Johor, Malaysia; Venue: EduCity Sports Complex; Level: International Series; Prize: $8,000; Format: 64MS/32WS/32MD/32WD/32XD	(South Korea) Kim Seong-min	(Vietnam) Bùi Bích Phương
8 September	Malaysia International: Dates: 9 September – 14 September; Host: Johor, Malaysia; Venue: EduCity Sports Complex; Level: International Series; Prize: $8,000; Format: 64MS/32WS/32MD/32WD/32XD	Score: 21–18, 15–21, 21–14	
8 September	Malaysia International: Dates: 9 September – 14 September; Host: Johor, Malaysia; Venue: EduCity Sports Complex; Level: International Series; Prize: $8,000; Format: 64MS/32WS/32MD/32WD/32XD	(Malaysia) Muhammad Faiq (Malaysia) Lok Hong Quan	(South Korea) Kim Jae-hyeon (South Korea) Lee Sang-won
8 September	Malaysia International: Dates: 9 September – 14 September; Host: Johor, Malaysia; Venue: EduCity Sports Complex; Level: International Series; Prize: $8,000; Format: 64MS/32WS/32MD/32WD/32XD	Score: 21–16, 19–21, 21–14	
8 September	Malaysia International: Dates: 9 September – 14 September; Host: Johor, Malaysia; Venue: EduCity Sports Complex; Level: International Series; Prize: $8,000; Format: 64MS/32WS/32MD/32WD/32XD	(South Korea) Jang Eun-seo (South Korea) Kim Yu-jung	(Chinese Taipei) Chen Hsuan-ni (Chinese Taipei) Hsieh Mi-yen
8 September	Malaysia International: Dates: 9 September – 14 September; Host: Johor, Malaysia; Venue: EduCity Sports Complex; Level: International Series; Prize: $8,000; Format: 64MS/32WS/32MD/32WD/32XD	Score: 21–10, 21–17	
8 September	Malaysia International: Dates: 9 September – 14 September; Host: Johor, Malaysia; Venue: EduCity Sports Complex; Level: International Series; Prize: $8,000; Format: 64MS/32WS/32MD/32WD/32XD	(South Korea) Kim Jae-hyeon (South Korea) Jang Eun-seo	(South Korea) Noh Jin-seong (South Korea) Lee Ye-na
8 September	Malaysia International: Dates: 9 September – 14 September; Host: Johor, Malaysia; Venue: EduCity Sports Complex; Level: International Series; Prize: $8,000; Format: 64MS/32WS/32MD/32WD/32XD	Score: 21–8, 21–18	
8 September	Costa Rica Future Series: Dates: 9 September – 13 September; Host: San José, Costa Rica; Venue: BN Arena; Level: Future Series; Format: 32MS/32WS/32MD/32WD/32XD	(Guatemala) Kevin Cordón	(Sri Lanka) Dumindu Abeywickrama
8 September	Costa Rica Future Series: Dates: 9 September – 13 September; Host: San José, Costa Rica; Venue: BN Arena; Level: Future Series; Format: 32MS/32WS/32MD/32WD/32XD	Score: 21–18, 12–21, 21–16	
8 September	Costa Rica Future Series: Dates: 9 September – 13 September; Host: San José, Costa Rica; Venue: BN Arena; Level: Future Series; Format: 32MS/32WS/32MD/32WD/32XD	(Italy) Yasmine Hamza	(France) Romane Cloteaux-Foucault
8 September	Costa Rica Future Series: Dates: 9 September – 13 September; Host: San José, Costa Rica; Venue: BN Arena; Level: Future Series; Format: 32MS/32WS/32MD/32WD/32XD	Score: 21–14, 21–17	
8 September	Costa Rica Future Series: Dates: 9 September – 13 September; Host: San José, Costa Rica; Venue: BN Arena; Level: Future Series; Format: 32MS/32WS/32MD/32WD/32XD	(Denmark) Emil Langemark (Denmark) Mikkel Langemark	(United States) Jay Chun (United States) Jacob Zhang
8 September	Costa Rica Future Series: Dates: 9 September – 13 September; Host: San José, Costa Rica; Venue: BN Arena; Level: Future Series; Format: 32MS/32WS/32MD/32WD/32XD	Score: 21–19, 22–20	
8 September	Costa Rica Future Series: Dates: 9 September – 13 September; Host: San José, Costa Rica; Venue: BN Arena; Level: Future Series; Format: 32MS/32WS/32MD/32WD/32XD	(Spain) Amaia Torralba (Spain) Jana Villanueva	(Argentina) Iona Gualdi (Argentina) Ailén Oliva
8 September	Costa Rica Future Series: Dates: 9 September – 13 September; Host: San José, Costa Rica; Venue: BN Arena; Level: Future Series; Format: 32MS/32WS/32MD/32WD/32XD	Score: 21–15, 21–14	
8 September	Costa Rica Future Series: Dates: 9 September – 13 September; Host: San José, Costa Rica; Venue: BN Arena; Level: Future Series; Format: 32MS/32WS/32MD/32WD/32XD	(Spain) Vicente Gázquez (Spain) Amaia Torralba	(Spain) Marcos Garcia (Spain) Jana Villanueva
8 September	Costa Rica Future Series: Dates: 9 September – 13 September; Host: San José, Costa Rica; Venue: BN Arena; Level: Future Series; Format: 32MS/32WS/32MD/32WD/32XD	Score: 21–9, 21–16	
8 September	Lithuanian International: Dates: 10 September – 13 September; Host: Kaunas, Lithuania; Venue: Kaunas Sports Hall; Level: Future Series; Format: 32MS/32WS/32MD/32WD/32XD	(Italy) Christopher Vittoriani	(France) Mady Sow
8 September	Lithuanian International: Dates: 10 September – 13 September; Host: Kaunas, Lithuania; Venue: Kaunas Sports Hall; Level: Future Series; Format: 32MS/32WS/32MD/32WD/32XD	Score: 21–9, 22–20	
8 September	Lithuanian International: Dates: 10 September – 13 September; Host: Kaunas, Lithuania; Venue: Kaunas Sports Hall; Level: Future Series; Format: 32MS/32WS/32MD/32WD/32XD	(France) Lole Courtois	(Sweden) Cecilia Wang
8 September	Lithuanian International: Dates: 10 September – 13 September; Host: Kaunas, Lithuania; Venue: Kaunas Sports Hall; Level: Future Series; Format: 32MS/32WS/32MD/32WD/32XD	Score: 21–11, 21–14	
8 September	Lithuanian International: Dates: 10 September – 13 September; Host: Kaunas, Lithuania; Venue: Kaunas Sports Hall; Level: Future Series; Format: 32MS/32WS/32MD/32WD/32XD	(Switzerland) Yann Orteu (Switzerland) Minh Quang Pham	(Estonia) Karl Kert (Estonia) Tauri Kilk
8 September	Lithuanian International: Dates: 10 September – 13 September; Host: Kaunas, Lithuania; Venue: Kaunas Sports Hall; Level: Future Series; Format: 32MS/32WS/32MD/32WD/32XD	Score: 21–9, 21–18	
8 September	Lithuanian International: Dates: 10 September – 13 September; Host: Kaunas, Lithuania; Venue: Kaunas Sports Hall; Level: Future Series; Format: 32MS/32WS/32MD/32WD/32XD	(Ukraine) Maria Koriagina (Ukraine) Yaroslava Vantsarovska	(France) Eva Bouville (France) Marjolene Raffin
8 September	Lithuanian International: Dates: 10 September – 13 September; Host: Kaunas, Lithuania; Venue: Kaunas Sports Hall; Level: Future Series; Format: 32MS/32WS/32MD/32WD/32XD	Score: 21–14, 18–21, 21–12	
8 September	Lithuanian International: Dates: 10 September – 13 September; Host: Kaunas, Lithuania; Venue: Kaunas Sports Hall; Level: Future Series; Format: 32MS/32WS/32MD/32WD/32XD	(Sweden) Max Svensson (Sweden) Sofia Strömvall	(France) Thibault Gardon (France) Agathe Cuevas
8 September	Lithuanian International: Dates: 10 September – 13 September; Host: Kaunas, Lithuania; Venue: Kaunas Sports Hall; Level: Future Series; Format: 32MS/32WS/32MD/32WD/32XD	Score: 21–18, 24–22	
15 September	China Masters (Draw): Dates: 16 September – 21 September; Host: Shenzhen, China; Venue: Shenzhen Bay Sports Center; Level: Super 750; Prize: $950,000; Format: 32MS/32WS/32MD/32WD/32XD	(China) Weng Hongyang	(Chinese Taipei) Lin Chun-yi
15 September	China Masters (Draw): Dates: 16 September – 21 September; Host: Shenzhen, China; Venue: Shenzhen Bay Sports Center; Level: Super 750; Prize: $950,000; Format: 32MS/32WS/32MD/32WD/32XD	Score: 21–11, 21–15	
15 September	China Masters (Draw): Dates: 16 September – 21 September; Host: Shenzhen, China; Venue: Shenzhen Bay Sports Center; Level: Super 750; Prize: $950,000; Format: 32MS/32WS/32MD/32WD/32XD	(South Korea) An Se-young	(China) Han Yue
15 September	China Masters (Draw): Dates: 16 September – 21 September; Host: Shenzhen, China; Venue: Shenzhen Bay Sports Center; Level: Super 750; Prize: $950,000; Format: 32MS/32WS/32MD/32WD/32XD	Score: 21–11, 21–3	
15 September	China Masters (Draw): Dates: 16 September – 21 September; Host: Shenzhen, China; Venue: Shenzhen Bay Sports Center; Level: Super 750; Prize: $950,000; Format: 32MS/32WS/32MD/32WD/32XD	(South Korea) Kim Won-ho (South Korea) Seo Seung-jae	(India) Satwiksairaj Rankireddy (India) Chirag Shetty
15 September	China Masters (Draw): Dates: 16 September – 21 September; Host: Shenzhen, China; Venue: Shenzhen Bay Sports Center; Level: Super 750; Prize: $950,000; Format: 32MS/32WS/32MD/32WD/32XD	Score: 21–19, 21–15	
15 September	China Masters (Draw): Dates: 16 September – 21 September; Host: Shenzhen, China; Venue: Shenzhen Bay Sports Center; Level: Super 750; Prize: $950,000; Format: 32MS/32WS/32MD/32WD/32XD	(China) Jia Yifan (China) Zhang Shuxian	(South Korea) Kim Hye-jeong (South Korea) Kong Hee-yong
15 September	China Masters (Draw): Dates: 16 September – 21 September; Host: Shenzhen, China; Venue: Shenzhen Bay Sports Center; Level: Super 750; Prize: $950,000; Format: 32MS/32WS/32MD/32WD/32XD	Score: 21–19, 16–21, 21–13	
15 September	China Masters (Draw): Dates: 16 September – 21 September; Host: Shenzhen, China; Venue: Shenzhen Bay Sports Center; Level: Super 750; Prize: $950,000; Format: 32MS/32WS/32MD/32WD/32XD	(Thailand) Dechapol Puavaranukroh (Thailand) Supissara Paewsampran	(Malaysia) Chen Tang Jie (Malaysia) Toh Ee Wei
15 September	China Masters (Draw): Dates: 16 September – 21 September; Host: Shenzhen, China; Venue: Shenzhen Bay Sports Center; Level: Super 750; Prize: $950,000; Format: 32MS/32WS/32MD/32WD/32XD	Score: 21–8, 21–17	
15 September	Indonesia Masters Super 100 I (Draw): Dates: 16 September – 21 September; Host: Pekanbaru, Indonesia; Venue: Gelanggang Remaja Pekanbaru; Level: Super 100; Prize: $110,000; Format: 48MS/32WS/32MD/32WD/32XD	(Indonesia) Chico Aura Dwi Wardoyo	(South Korea) Jeon Hyeok-jin
15 September	Indonesia Masters Super 100 I (Draw): Dates: 16 September – 21 September; Host: Pekanbaru, Indonesia; Venue: Gelanggang Remaja Pekanbaru; Level: Super 100; Prize: $110,000; Format: 48MS/32WS/32MD/32WD/32XD	Score: 13–21, 21–9, 21–17	
15 September	Indonesia Masters Super 100 I (Draw): Dates: 16 September – 21 September; Host: Pekanbaru, Indonesia; Venue: Gelanggang Remaja Pekanbaru; Level: Super 100; Prize: $110,000; Format: 48MS/32WS/32MD/32WD/32XD	(Chinese Taipei) Huang Yu-hsun	(Japan) Sakura Masuki
15 September	Indonesia Masters Super 100 I (Draw): Dates: 16 September – 21 September; Host: Pekanbaru, Indonesia; Venue: Gelanggang Remaja Pekanbaru; Level: Super 100; Prize: $110,000; Format: 48MS/32WS/32MD/32WD/32XD	Score: 16–21, 21–18, 21–13	
15 September	Indonesia Masters Super 100 I (Draw): Dates: 16 September – 21 September; Host: Pekanbaru, Indonesia; Venue: Gelanggang Remaja Pekanbaru; Level: Super 100; Prize: $110,000; Format: 48MS/32WS/32MD/32WD/32XD	(South Korea) Jin Yong (South Korea) Na Sung-seung	(Japan) Kakeru Kumagai (Japan) Hiroki Nishi
15 September	Indonesia Masters Super 100 I (Draw): Dates: 16 September – 21 September; Host: Pekanbaru, Indonesia; Venue: Gelanggang Remaja Pekanbaru; Level: Super 100; Prize: $110,000; Format: 48MS/32WS/32MD/32WD/32XD	Score: 21–19, 13–21, 21–13	
15 September	Indonesia Masters Super 100 I (Draw): Dates: 16 September – 21 September; Host: Pekanbaru, Indonesia; Venue: Gelanggang Remaja Pekanbaru; Level: Super 100; Prize: $110,000; Format: 48MS/32WS/32MD/32WD/32XD	(Chinese Taipei) Lin Xiao-min (Chinese Taipei) Wang Yu-qiao	(Japan) Ririna Hiramoto (Japan) Kokona Ishikawa
15 September	Indonesia Masters Super 100 I (Draw): Dates: 16 September – 21 September; Host: Pekanbaru, Indonesia; Venue: Gelanggang Remaja Pekanbaru; Level: Super 100; Prize: $110,000; Format: 48MS/32WS/32MD/32WD/32XD	Score: 21–17, 21–9	
15 September	Indonesia Masters Super 100 I (Draw): Dates: 16 September – 21 September; Host: Pekanbaru, Indonesia; Venue: Gelanggang Remaja Pekanbaru; Level: Super 100; Prize: $110,000; Format: 48MS/32WS/32MD/32WD/32XD	(Denmark) Mathias Christiansen (Denmark) Alexandra Bøje	(Malaysia) Jimmy Wong (Malaysia) Lai Pei Jing
15 September	Indonesia Masters Super 100 I (Draw): Dates: 16 September – 21 September; Host: Pekanbaru, Indonesia; Venue: Gelanggang Remaja Pekanbaru; Level: Super 100; Prize: $110,000; Format: 48MS/32WS/32MD/32WD/32XD	Score: 13–21, 23–21, 21–14	
15 September	Perú International: Dates: 17 September – 21 September; Host: Lima, Peru; Venue: Villa Deportiva Nacional; Level: International Series; Prize: $5,000; Format: 32MS/32WS/32MD/16WD/32XD	(Guatemala) Kevin Cordón	(France) Arthur Wakhevitsch
15 September	Perú International: Dates: 17 September – 21 September; Host: Lima, Peru; Venue: Villa Deportiva Nacional; Level: International Series; Prize: $5,000; Format: 32MS/32WS/32MD/16WD/32XD	Score: 8–15, 15–12, 15–11	
15 September	Perú International: Dates: 17 September – 21 September; Host: Lima, Peru; Venue: Villa Deportiva Nacional; Level: International Series; Prize: $5,000; Format: 32MS/32WS/32MD/16WD/32XD	(Brazil) Juliana Vieira	(Peru) Inés Castillo
15 September	Perú International: Dates: 17 September – 21 September; Host: Lima, Peru; Venue: Villa Deportiva Nacional; Level: International Series; Prize: $5,000; Format: 32MS/32WS/32MD/16WD/32XD	Score: 8–15, 15–8, 15–6	
15 September	Perú International: Dates: 17 September – 21 September; Host: Lima, Peru; Venue: Villa Deportiva Nacional; Level: International Series; Prize: $5,000; Format: 32MS/32WS/32MD/16WD/32XD	(Brazil) Fabrício Farias (Brazil) Davi Silva	(Brazil) Izak Batalha (Brazil) Matheus Voigt
15 September	Perú International: Dates: 17 September – 21 September; Host: Lima, Peru; Venue: Villa Deportiva Nacional; Level: International Series; Prize: $5,000; Format: 32MS/32WS/32MD/16WD/32XD	Score: 15–12, 15–10	
15 September	Perú International: Dates: 17 September – 21 September; Host: Lima, Peru; Venue: Villa Deportiva Nacional; Level: International Series; Prize: $5,000; Format: 32MS/32WS/32MD/16WD/32XD	(Brazil) Jaqueline Lima (Brazil) Sâmia Lima	(Peru) Fernanda Munar (Peru) Rafaela Munar
15 September	Perú International: Dates: 17 September – 21 September; Host: Lima, Peru; Venue: Villa Deportiva Nacional; Level: International Series; Prize: $5,000; Format: 32MS/32WS/32MD/16WD/32XD	Score: 15–8, 15–8	
15 September	Perú International: Dates: 17 September – 21 September; Host: Lima, Peru; Venue: Villa Deportiva Nacional; Level: International Series; Prize: $5,000; Format: 32MS/32WS/32MD/16WD/32XD	(Brazil) Davi Silva (Brazil) Sânia Lima	(Brazil) Fabrício Farias (Brazil) Jaqueline Lima
15 September	Perú International: Dates: 17 September – 21 September; Host: Lima, Peru; Venue: Villa Deportiva Nacional; Level: International Series; Prize: $5,000; Format: 32MS/32WS/32MD/16WD/32XD	Score: 15–11, 15–13	
15 September	Polish International: Dates: 17 September – 21 September; Host: Kraków, Poland; Venue: Sport Hall of AGH University of Kraków; Level: International Series; Prize: $5,000; Format: 32MS/32WS/32MD/32WD/32XD	(Denmark) William Bøgebjerg	(Chinese Taipei) Su Wei-Cheng
15 September	Polish International: Dates: 17 September – 21 September; Host: Kraków, Poland; Venue: Sport Hall of AGH University of Kraków; Level: International Series; Prize: $5,000; Format: 32MS/32WS/32MD/32WD/32XD	Score: 21–18, 21–16	
15 September	Polish International: Dates: 17 September – 21 September; Host: Kraków, Poland; Venue: Sport Hall of AGH University of Kraków; Level: International Series; Prize: $5,000; Format: 32MS/32WS/32MD/32WD/32XD	(Chinese Taipei) Peng Yu Wei	(Austria) Xu Wei
15 September	Polish International: Dates: 17 September – 21 September; Host: Kraków, Poland; Venue: Sport Hall of AGH University of Kraków; Level: International Series; Prize: $5,000; Format: 32MS/32WS/32MD/32WD/32XD	Score: 21–8, 21–7	
15 September	Polish International: Dates: 17 September – 21 September; Host: Kraków, Poland; Venue: Sport Hall of AGH University of Kraków; Level: International Series; Prize: $5,000; Format: 32MS/32WS/32MD/32WD/32XD	(Japan) Shuji Sawada (Japan) Tsubasa Yoshida	(Germany) Malik Bourakkadi (Germany) Kenneth Neumann
15 September	Polish International: Dates: 17 September – 21 September; Host: Kraków, Poland; Venue: Sport Hall of AGH University of Kraków; Level: International Series; Prize: $5,000; Format: 32MS/32WS/32MD/32WD/32XD	Score: 21–17, 22–20	
15 September	Polish International: Dates: 17 September – 21 September; Host: Kraków, Poland; Venue: Sport Hall of AGH University of Kraków; Level: International Series; Prize: $5,000; Format: 32MS/32WS/32MD/32WD/32XD	(Japan) Yuma Nagasako (Japan) Aya Tamaki	(Sweden) Malena Norrman (Sweden) Tilda Sjöö
15 September	Polish International: Dates: 17 September – 21 September; Host: Kraków, Poland; Venue: Sport Hall of AGH University of Kraków; Level: International Series; Prize: $5,000; Format: 32MS/32WS/32MD/32WD/32XD	Score: 21–10, 21–12	
15 September	Polish International: Dates: 17 September – 21 September; Host: Kraków, Poland; Venue: Sport Hall of AGH University of Kraków; Level: International Series; Prize: $5,000; Format: 32MS/32WS/32MD/32WD/32XD	(Japan) Shuji Sawada (Japan) Aya Tamaki	(Sweden) Filip Karlborg (Sweden) Tilda Sjöö
15 September	Polish International: Dates: 17 September – 21 September; Host: Kraków, Poland; Venue: Sport Hall of AGH University of Kraków; Level: International Series; Prize: $5,000; Format: 32MS/32WS/32MD/32WD/32XD	Score: 16–21, 21–17, 21–17	
22 September	Korea Open (Draw): Dates: 23 September – 28 September; Host: Suwon, South Korea; Venue: Suwon Gymnasium; Level: Super 500; Prize: $475,000; Format: 32MS/32WS/32MD/32WD/32XD	(Indonesia) Jonatan Christie	(Denmark) Anders Antonsen
22 September	Korea Open (Draw): Dates: 23 September – 28 September; Host: Suwon, South Korea; Venue: Suwon Gymnasium; Level: Super 500; Prize: $475,000; Format: 32MS/32WS/32MD/32WD/32XD	Score: 21–10, 15–21, 21–17	
22 September	Korea Open (Draw): Dates: 23 September – 28 September; Host: Suwon, South Korea; Venue: Suwon Gymnasium; Level: Super 500; Prize: $475,000; Format: 32MS/32WS/32MD/32WD/32XD	(Japan) Akane Yamaguchi	(South Korea) An Se-young
22 September	Korea Open (Draw): Dates: 23 September – 28 September; Host: Suwon, South Korea; Venue: Suwon Gymnasium; Level: Super 500; Prize: $475,000; Format: 32MS/32WS/32MD/32WD/32XD	Score: 21–18, 21–13	
22 September	Korea Open (Draw): Dates: 23 September – 28 September; Host: Suwon, South Korea; Venue: Suwon Gymnasium; Level: Super 500; Prize: $475,000; Format: 32MS/32WS/32MD/32WD/32XD	(South Korea) Kim Won-ho (South Korea) Seo Seung-jae	(Indonesia) Fajar Alfian (Indonesia) Muhammad Shohibul Fikri
22 September	Korea Open (Draw): Dates: 23 September – 28 September; Host: Suwon, South Korea; Venue: Suwon Gymnasium; Level: Super 500; Prize: $475,000; Format: 32MS/32WS/32MD/32WD/32XD	Score: 21–16, 23–21	
22 September	Korea Open (Draw): Dates: 23 September – 28 September; Host: Suwon, South Korea; Venue: Suwon Gymnasium; Level: Super 500; Prize: $475,000; Format: 32MS/32WS/32MD/32WD/32XD	(South Korea) Kim Hye-jeong (South Korea) Kong Hee-yong	(Japan) Rin Iwanaga (Japan) Kie Nakanishi
22 September	Korea Open (Draw): Dates: 23 September – 28 September; Host: Suwon, South Korea; Venue: Suwon Gymnasium; Level: Super 500; Prize: $475,000; Format: 32MS/32WS/32MD/32WD/32XD	Score: 21–19, 21–12	
22 September	Korea Open (Draw): Dates: 23 September – 28 September; Host: Suwon, South Korea; Venue: Suwon Gymnasium; Level: Super 500; Prize: $475,000; Format: 32MS/32WS/32MD/32WD/32XD	(China) Feng Yanzhe (China) Huang Dongping	(China) Jiang Zhenbang (China) Wei Yaxin
22 September	Korea Open (Draw): Dates: 23 September – 28 September; Host: Suwon, South Korea; Venue: Suwon Gymnasium; Level: Super 500; Prize: $475,000; Format: 32MS/32WS/32MD/32WD/32XD	Score: 25–23, 21–11	
22 September	Kaohsiung Masters (Draw): Dates: 23 September – 28 September; Host: Kaohsiung, Taiwan; Venue: Kaohsiung Arena; Level: Super 100; Prize: $110,000; Format: 64MS/32WS/32MD/32WD/32XD	(Chinese Taipei) Wang Po-wei	(Thailand) Panitchaphon Teeraratsakul
22 September	Kaohsiung Masters (Draw): Dates: 23 September – 28 September; Host: Kaohsiung, Taiwan; Venue: Kaohsiung Arena; Level: Super 100; Prize: $110,000; Format: 64MS/32WS/32MD/32WD/32XD	Score: 12–21, 21–18, 21–12	
22 September	Kaohsiung Masters (Draw): Dates: 23 September – 28 September; Host: Kaohsiung, Taiwan; Venue: Kaohsiung Arena; Level: Super 100; Prize: $110,000; Format: 64MS/32WS/32MD/32WD/32XD	(Japan) Nozomi Okuhara	(Japan) Hina Akechi
22 September	Kaohsiung Masters (Draw): Dates: 23 September – 28 September; Host: Kaohsiung, Taiwan; Venue: Kaohsiung Arena; Level: Super 100; Prize: $110,000; Format: 64MS/32WS/32MD/32WD/32XD	Score: 21–16, 21–17	
22 September	Kaohsiung Masters (Draw): Dates: 23 September – 28 September; Host: Kaohsiung, Taiwan; Venue: Kaohsiung Arena; Level: Super 100; Prize: $110,000; Format: 64MS/32WS/32MD/32WD/32XD	(Japan) Kakeru Kumagai (Japan) Hiroki Nishi	(Chinese Taipei) Su Ching-heng (Chinese Taipei) Wu Guan-xun
22 September	Kaohsiung Masters (Draw): Dates: 23 September – 28 September; Host: Kaohsiung, Taiwan; Venue: Kaohsiung Arena; Level: Super 100; Prize: $110,000; Format: 64MS/32WS/32MD/32WD/32XD	Score: 21–18, 21–17	
22 September	Kaohsiung Masters (Draw): Dates: 23 September – 28 September; Host: Kaohsiung, Taiwan; Venue: Kaohsiung Arena; Level: Super 100; Prize: $110,000; Format: 64MS/32WS/32MD/32WD/32XD	(Japan) Ririna Hiramoto (Japan) Kokona Ishikawa	(Japan) Hinata Suzuki (Japan) Nao Yamakita
22 September	Kaohsiung Masters (Draw): Dates: 23 September – 28 September; Host: Kaohsiung, Taiwan; Venue: Kaohsiung Arena; Level: Super 100; Prize: $110,000; Format: 64MS/32WS/32MD/32WD/32XD	Score: 21–16, 21–17	
22 September	Kaohsiung Masters (Draw): Dates: 23 September – 28 September; Host: Kaohsiung, Taiwan; Venue: Kaohsiung Arena; Level: Super 100; Prize: $110,000; Format: 64MS/32WS/32MD/32WD/32XD	(Japan) Akira Koga (Japan) Yuho Imai	(Chinese Taipei) Wu Hsuan-yi (Chinese Taipei) Yang Chu-yun
22 September	Kaohsiung Masters (Draw): Dates: 23 September – 28 September; Host: Kaohsiung, Taiwan; Venue: Kaohsiung Arena; Level: Super 100; Prize: $110,000; Format: 64MS/32WS/32MD/32WD/32XD	Score: 16–21, 21–13, 21–15	
22 September	La Perla del Otun: Dates: 24 September – 28 September; Host: Pereira, Colombia; Venue: Coliseo Menor; Level: Future Series; Format: 32MS/32WS/32MD/16WD/32XD	(United States) Enrico Asuncion	(Sri Lanka) Dumindu Abeywickrama
22 September	La Perla del Otun: Dates: 24 September – 28 September; Host: Pereira, Colombia; Venue: Coliseo Menor; Level: Future Series; Format: 32MS/32WS/32MD/16WD/32XD	Score: 21–15, 19–21, 21–16	
22 September	La Perla del Otun: Dates: 24 September – 28 September; Host: Pereira, Colombia; Venue: Coliseo Menor; Level: Future Series; Format: 32MS/32WS/32MD/16WD/32XD	(Peru) Inés Castillo	(Colombia) Juliana Giraldo
22 September	La Perla del Otun: Dates: 24 September – 28 September; Host: Pereira, Colombia; Venue: Coliseo Menor; Level: Future Series; Format: 32MS/32WS/32MD/16WD/32XD	Score: 21–19, 24–22	
22 September	La Perla del Otun: Dates: 24 September – 28 September; Host: Pereira, Colombia; Venue: Coliseo Menor; Level: Future Series; Format: 32MS/32WS/32MD/16WD/32XD	(United States) Enrico Asuncion (Malta) Samuel Cassar	(Mexico) Erick Trujillo (Mexico) Israel Vázquez
22 September	La Perla del Otun: Dates: 24 September – 28 September; Host: Pereira, Colombia; Venue: Coliseo Menor; Level: Future Series; Format: 32MS/32WS/32MD/16WD/32XD	Score: 21–13, 21–16	
22 September	La Perla del Otun: Dates: 24 September – 28 September; Host: Pereira, Colombia; Venue: Coliseo Menor; Level: Future Series; Format: 32MS/32WS/32MD/16WD/32XD	(Colombia) Juliana Giraldo (Colombia) Karen Patiño	(Venezuela) Mariangel Garcia (Venezuela) Maria Rojas
22 September	La Perla del Otun: Dates: 24 September – 28 September; Host: Pereira, Colombia; Venue: Coliseo Menor; Level: Future Series; Format: 32MS/32WS/32MD/16WD/32XD	Score: 21–16, 21–14	
22 September	La Perla del Otun: Dates: 24 September – 28 September; Host: Pereira, Colombia; Venue: Coliseo Menor; Level: Future Series; Format: 32MS/32WS/32MD/16WD/32XD	(Argentina) Nicolas Oliva (Argentina) Ailén Oliva	(Colombia) Daine Marulanda (Colombia) Ana Higuita
22 September	La Perla del Otun: Dates: 24 September – 28 September; Host: Pereira, Colombia; Venue: Coliseo Menor; Level: Future Series; Format: 32MS/32WS/32MD/16WD/32XD	Score: 21–16, 21–18	
22 September	Kampala International: Dates: 25 September – 28 September; Host: Kampala, Uganda; Venue: Lugogo Stadium; Level: Future Series; Format: 32MS/32WS/16MD/8WD/8XD	(India) Harsheel Dani	(Myanmar) Hein Htut
22 September	Kampala International: Dates: 25 September – 28 September; Host: Kampala, Uganda; Venue: Lugogo Stadium; Level: Future Series; Format: 32MS/32WS/16MD/8WD/8XD	Score: 16–14, 6–15, 16–14	
22 September	Kampala International: Dates: 25 September – 28 September; Host: Kampala, Uganda; Venue: Lugogo Stadium; Level: Future Series; Format: 32MS/32WS/16MD/8WD/8XD	(India) Rujula Ramu	(Switzerland) Jenjira Stadelmann
22 September	Kampala International: Dates: 25 September – 28 September; Host: Kampala, Uganda; Venue: Lugogo Stadium; Level: Future Series; Format: 32MS/32WS/16MD/8WD/8XD	Score: 12–15, 15–9, 15–11	
22 September	Kampala International: Dates: 25 September – 28 September; Host: Kampala, Uganda; Venue: Lugogo Stadium; Level: Future Series; Format: 32MS/32WS/16MD/8WD/8XD	(Malaysia) Ashraf Zakaria (Malaysia) Ariffin Zakaria	(India) Dharmagna Mandapati (India) Chiranjeevi Reddy Sundar
22 September	Kampala International: Dates: 25 September – 28 September; Host: Kampala, Uganda; Venue: Lugogo Stadium; Level: Future Series; Format: 32MS/32WS/16MD/8WD/8XD	Score: 12–15, 15–8, 15–12	
22 September	Kampala International: Dates: 25 September – 28 September; Host: Kampala, Uganda; Venue: Lugogo Stadium; Level: Future Series; Format: 32MS/32WS/16MD/8WD/8XD	(Switzerland) Jenjira Stadelmann (Switzerland) Leila Zarrouk	(Malaysia) Lim Xuan (Malaysia) Joanne Ng
22 September	Kampala International: Dates: 25 September – 28 September; Host: Kampala, Uganda; Venue: Lugogo Stadium; Level: Future Series; Format: 32MS/32WS/16MD/8WD/8XD	Score: 15–7, 15–5	
22 September	Kampala International: Dates: 25 September – 28 September; Host: Kampala, Uganda; Venue: Lugogo Stadium; Level: Future Series; Format: 32MS/32WS/16MD/8WD/8XD	(Malaysia) Ashraf Zakaria (Malaysia) Lim Xuan	(Malaysia) Chong Zi Xiang (Malaysia) Joanne Ng
22 September	Kampala International: Dates: 25 September – 28 September; Host: Kampala, Uganda; Venue: Lugogo Stadium; Level: Future Series; Format: 32MS/32WS/16MD/8WD/8XD	Score: 8–15, 15–13, 16–14	
22 September	Croatian International: Dates: 25 September – 28 September; Host: Samobor, Croatia; Venue: Sport hall Samobor; Level: Future Series; Format: 32MS/32WS/32MD/16WD/32XD	(Chinese Taipei) Huang Yu	(India) Orijit Chaliha
22 September	Croatian International: Dates: 25 September – 28 September; Host: Samobor, Croatia; Venue: Sport hall Samobor; Level: Future Series; Format: 32MS/32WS/32MD/16WD/32XD	Score: 21–18, 21–17	
22 September	Croatian International: Dates: 25 September – 28 September; Host: Samobor, Croatia; Venue: Sport hall Samobor; Level: Future Series; Format: 32MS/32WS/32MD/16WD/32XD	(Japan) Yuma Nagasako	(Chinese Taipei) Peng Yu-wei
22 September	Croatian International: Dates: 25 September – 28 September; Host: Samobor, Croatia; Venue: Sport hall Samobor; Level: Future Series; Format: 32MS/32WS/32MD/16WD/32XD	Score: 7–3 retired	
22 September	Croatian International: Dates: 25 September – 28 September; Host: Samobor, Croatia; Venue: Sport hall Samobor; Level: Future Series; Format: 32MS/32WS/32MD/16WD/32XD	(Japan) Shuji Sawada (Japan) Tsubasa Yoshida	(Slovenia) Miha Ivančič (Slovenia) Tadej Jelenc
22 September	Croatian International: Dates: 25 September – 28 September; Host: Samobor, Croatia; Venue: Sport hall Samobor; Level: Future Series; Format: 32MS/32WS/32MD/16WD/32XD	Score: 21–12, 21–7	
22 September	Croatian International: Dates: 25 September – 28 September; Host: Samobor, Croatia; Venue: Sport hall Samobor; Level: Future Series; Format: 32MS/32WS/32MD/16WD/32XD	(Japan) Yuma Nagasako (Japan) Aya Tamaki	(Poland) Jessica Orzechowicz (Poland) Julia Piwowar
22 September	Croatian International: Dates: 25 September – 28 September; Host: Samobor, Croatia; Venue: Sport hall Samobor; Level: Future Series; Format: 32MS/32WS/32MD/16WD/32XD	Score: 21–8 retired	
22 September	Croatian International: Dates: 25 September – 28 September; Host: Samobor, Croatia; Venue: Sport hall Samobor; Level: Future Series; Format: 32MS/32WS/32MD/16WD/32XD	(Japan) Shuji Sawada (Japan) Aya Tamaki	(Japan) Tsubasa Yoshida (Japan) Rima Sekino
22 September	Croatian International: Dates: 25 September – 28 September; Host: Samobor, Croatia; Venue: Sport hall Samobor; Level: Future Series; Format: 32MS/32WS/32MD/16WD/32XD	Score: 21–18, 24–26, 21–13	
29 September	Al Ain Masters (Draw): Dates: 30 September – 5 October; Host: Al Ain, United Arab Emirates; Venue: Al Ain Club; Level: Super 100; Prize: $120,000; Format: 48MS/32WS/32MD/32WD/32XD	(Finland) Joakim Oldorff	(Malaysia) Aidil Sholeh
29 September	Al Ain Masters (Draw): Dates: 30 September – 5 October; Host: Al Ain, United Arab Emirates; Venue: Al Ain Club; Level: Super 100; Prize: $120,000; Format: 48MS/32WS/32MD/32WD/32XD	Score: 14–21, 21–17, 21–7	
29 September	Al Ain Masters (Draw): Dates: 30 September – 5 October; Host: Al Ain, United Arab Emirates; Venue: Al Ain Club; Level: Super 100; Prize: $120,000; Format: 48MS/32WS/32MD/32WD/32XD	(India) Shriyanshi Valishetty	(India) Tasnim Mir
29 September	Al Ain Masters (Draw): Dates: 30 September – 5 October; Host: Al Ain, United Arab Emirates; Venue: Al Ain Club; Level: Super 100; Prize: $120,000; Format: 48MS/32WS/32MD/32WD/32XD	Score: 15–21, 22–20, 21–7	
29 September	Al Ain Masters (Draw): Dates: 30 September – 5 October; Host: Al Ain, United Arab Emirates; Venue: Al Ain Club; Level: Super 100; Prize: $120,000; Format: 48MS/32WS/32MD/32WD/32XD	(India) Hariharan Amsakarunan (India) Arjun M. R.	(Indonesia) Raymond Indra (Indonesia) Nikolaus Joaquin
29 September	Al Ain Masters (Draw): Dates: 30 September – 5 October; Host: Al Ain, United Arab Emirates; Venue: Al Ain Club; Level: Super 100; Prize: $120,000; Format: 48MS/32WS/32MD/32WD/32XD	Score: 21–17, 21–18	
29 September	Al Ain Masters (Draw): Dates: 30 September – 5 October; Host: Al Ain, United Arab Emirates; Venue: Al Ain Club; Level: Super 100; Prize: $120,000; Format: 48MS/32WS/32MD/32WD/32XD	(Bulgaria) Gabriela Stoeva (Bulgaria) Stefani Stoeva	(Chinese Taipei) Chen Yan-fei (Chinese Taipei) Sun Liang-ching
29 September	Al Ain Masters (Draw): Dates: 30 September – 5 October; Host: Al Ain, United Arab Emirates; Venue: Al Ain Club; Level: Super 100; Prize: $120,000; Format: 48MS/32WS/32MD/32WD/32XD	Score: 21–8, 21–13	
29 September	Al Ain Masters (Draw): Dates: 30 September – 5 October; Host: Al Ain, United Arab Emirates; Venue: Al Ain Club; Level: Super 100; Prize: $120,000; Format: 48MS/32WS/32MD/32WD/32XD	(Indonesia) Dejan Ferdinansyah (Indonesia) Bernadine Wardana	(Indonesia) Marwan Faza (Indonesia) Aisyah Salsabila Putri Pranata
29 September	Al Ain Masters (Draw): Dates: 30 September – 5 October; Host: Al Ain, United Arab Emirates; Venue: Al Ain Club; Level: Super 100; Prize: $120,000; Format: 48MS/32WS/32MD/32WD/32XD	Score: 21–12, 21–16	
29 September	Guatemala International: Dates: 30 September – 5 October; Host: Guatemala City, Guatemala; Venue: Parque Erick Barrondo; Level: International Challenge; Prize: $17,500; Format: 32MS/32WS/16MD/8WD/32XD	(Sri Lanka) Dumindu Abeywickrama	(United States) Mark Alcala
29 September	Guatemala International: Dates: 30 September – 5 October; Host: Guatemala City, Guatemala; Venue: Parque Erick Barrondo; Level: International Challenge; Prize: $17,500; Format: 32MS/32WS/16MD/8WD/32XD	Score: 21–18, 21–13	
29 September	Guatemala International: Dates: 30 September – 5 October; Host: Guatemala City, Guatemala; Venue: Parque Erick Barrondo; Level: International Challenge; Prize: $17,500; Format: 32MS/32WS/16MD/8WD/32XD	(Canada) Rachel Chan	(Japan) Shiori Ebihara
29 September	Guatemala International: Dates: 30 September – 5 October; Host: Guatemala City, Guatemala; Venue: Parque Erick Barrondo; Level: International Challenge; Prize: $17,500; Format: 32MS/32WS/16MD/8WD/32XD	Score: 21–14, 21–17	
29 September	Guatemala International: Dates: 30 September – 5 October; Host: Guatemala City, Guatemala; Venue: Parque Erick Barrondo; Level: International Challenge; Prize: $17,500; Format: 32MS/32WS/16MD/8WD/32XD	(Brazil) Fabrício Farias (Brazil) Davi Silva	(Canada) Kevin Lee (Canada) Ty Alexander Lindeman
29 September	Guatemala International: Dates: 30 September – 5 October; Host: Guatemala City, Guatemala; Venue: Parque Erick Barrondo; Level: International Challenge; Prize: $17,500; Format: 32MS/32WS/16MD/8WD/32XD	Score: 11–21, 22–20, 21–17	
29 September	Guatemala International: Dates: 30 September – 5 October; Host: Guatemala City, Guatemala; Venue: Parque Erick Barrondo; Level: International Challenge; Prize: $17,500; Format: 32MS/32WS/16MD/8WD/32XD	(Japan) Mao Hatasue (Japan) Kanano Muroya	(Brazil) Jaqueline Lima (Brazil) Sâmia Lima
29 September	Guatemala International: Dates: 30 September – 5 October; Host: Guatemala City, Guatemala; Venue: Parque Erick Barrondo; Level: International Challenge; Prize: $17,500; Format: 32MS/32WS/16MD/8WD/32XD	Score: 21–19, 21–16	
29 September	Guatemala International: Dates: 30 September – 5 October; Host: Guatemala City, Guatemala; Venue: Parque Erick Barrondo; Level: International Challenge; Prize: $17,500; Format: 32MS/32WS/16MD/8WD/32XD	(Canada) Timothy Lock (Canada) Chloe Hoang	(Mexico) Luis Montoya (Mexico) Miriam Rodríguez
29 September	Guatemala International: Dates: 30 September – 5 October; Host: Guatemala City, Guatemala; Venue: Parque Erick Barrondo; Level: International Challenge; Prize: $17,500; Format: 32MS/32WS/16MD/8WD/32XD	Score: 21–14, 21–18	
29 September	Dutch Open: Dates: 1 October – 5 October; Host: 's-Hertogenbosch, Netherlands; Venue: Maaspoort; Level: International Challenge; Prize: $17,500; Format: 32MS/32WS/32MD/16WD/32XD	(France) Arnaud Merklé	(Sweden) Gustav Björkler
29 September	Dutch Open: Dates: 1 October – 5 October; Host: 's-Hertogenbosch, Netherlands; Venue: Maaspoort; Level: International Challenge; Prize: $17,500; Format: 32MS/32WS/32MD/16WD/32XD	Score: 20–22, 21–15, 21–15	
29 September	Dutch Open: Dates: 1 October – 5 October; Host: 's-Hertogenbosch, Netherlands; Venue: Maaspoort; Level: International Challenge; Prize: $17,500; Format: 32MS/32WS/32MD/16WD/32XD	(Chinese Taipei) Huang Ching-ping	(India) Tara Shah
29 September	Dutch Open: Dates: 1 October – 5 October; Host: 's-Hertogenbosch, Netherlands; Venue: Maaspoort; Level: International Challenge; Prize: $17,500; Format: 32MS/32WS/32MD/16WD/32XD	Score: 21–18, 23–21	
29 September	Dutch Open: Dates: 1 October – 5 October; Host: 's-Hertogenbosch, Netherlands; Venue: Maaspoort; Level: International Challenge; Prize: $17,500; Format: 32MS/32WS/32MD/16WD/32XD	(France) Maël Cattoen (France) Lucas Renoir	(Chinese Taipei) Chiang Chien-wei (Chinese Taipei) Wu Hsuan-yi
29 September	Dutch Open: Dates: 1 October – 5 October; Host: 's-Hertogenbosch, Netherlands; Venue: Maaspoort; Level: International Challenge; Prize: $17,500; Format: 32MS/32WS/32MD/16WD/32XD	Score: 15–21, 22–20, 21–16	
29 September	Dutch Open: Dates: 1 October – 5 October; Host: 's-Hertogenbosch, Netherlands; Venue: Maaspoort; Level: International Challenge; Prize: $17,500; Format: 32MS/32WS/32MD/16WD/32XD	(France) Elsa Jacob (France) Flavie Vallet	(India) Ashwini Bhat (India) Shikha Gautam
29 September	Dutch Open: Dates: 1 October – 5 October; Host: 's-Hertogenbosch, Netherlands; Venue: Maaspoort; Level: International Challenge; Prize: $17,500; Format: 32MS/32WS/32MD/16WD/32XD	Score: 13–21, 21–19, 21–10	
29 September	Dutch Open: Dates: 1 October – 5 October; Host: 's-Hertogenbosch, Netherlands; Venue: Maaspoort; Level: International Challenge; Prize: $17,500; Format: 32MS/32WS/32MD/16WD/32XD	(Denmark) Kristoffer Kolding (Denmark) Mette Werge	(Indonesia) Bimo Prasetyo (Indonesia) Arlya Nabila Thesya Munggaran
29 September	Dutch Open: Dates: 1 October – 5 October; Host: 's-Hertogenbosch, Netherlands; Venue: Maaspoort; Level: International Challenge; Prize: $17,500; Format: 32MS/32WS/32MD/16WD/32XD	Score: 21–11, 22–20	
29 September	North Harbour International: Dates: 1 October – 5 October; Host: Auckland, New Zealand; Venue: Badminton North Harbour Centre; Level: International Challenge; Prize: $17,500; Format: 64MS/32WS/32MD/32WD/32XD	(Chinese Taipei) Wang Po-wei	(Chinese Taipei) Ting Yen-chen
29 September	North Harbour International: Dates: 1 October – 5 October; Host: Auckland, New Zealand; Venue: Badminton North Harbour Centre; Level: International Challenge; Prize: $17,500; Format: 64MS/32WS/32MD/32WD/32XD	Score: 20–22, 21–18, 21–19	
29 September	North Harbour International: Dates: 1 October – 5 October; Host: Auckland, New Zealand; Venue: Badminton North Harbour Centre; Level: International Challenge; Prize: $17,500; Format: 64MS/32WS/32MD/32WD/32XD	(Chinese Taipei) Tung Ciou-tong	(Philippines) Mikaela de Guzman
29 September	North Harbour International: Dates: 1 October – 5 October; Host: Auckland, New Zealand; Venue: Badminton North Harbour Centre; Level: International Challenge; Prize: $17,500; Format: 64MS/32WS/32MD/32WD/32XD	Score: 12–21, 21–11, 21–14	
29 September	North Harbour International: Dates: 1 October – 5 October; Host: Auckland, New Zealand; Venue: Badminton North Harbour Centre; Level: International Challenge; Prize: $17,500; Format: 64MS/32WS/32MD/32WD/32XD	(Chinese Taipei) Su Ching-heng (Chinese Taipei) Wu Guan-xun	(Chinese Taipei) Chen Zhi-ray (Chinese Taipei) Lin Yu-chieh
29 September	North Harbour International: Dates: 1 October – 5 October; Host: Auckland, New Zealand; Venue: Badminton North Harbour Centre; Level: International Challenge; Prize: $17,500; Format: 64MS/32WS/32MD/32WD/32XD	Score: 21–13, 18–21, 21–18	
29 September	North Harbour International: Dates: 1 October – 5 October; Host: Auckland, New Zealand; Venue: Badminton North Harbour Centre; Level: International Challenge; Prize: $17,500; Format: 64MS/32WS/32MD/32WD/32XD	(Chinese Taipei) Chen Su-yu (Chinese Taipei) Hsieh Yi-en	(Chinese Taipei) Ko Ro-hsuan (Chinese Taipei) Lee Yu-hsuan
29 September	North Harbour International: Dates: 1 October – 5 October; Host: Auckland, New Zealand; Venue: Badminton North Harbour Centre; Level: International Challenge; Prize: $17,500; Format: 64MS/32WS/32MD/32WD/32XD	Score: 21–15, 21–16	
29 September	North Harbour International: Dates: 1 October – 5 October; Host: Auckland, New Zealand; Venue: Badminton North Harbour Centre; Level: International Challenge; Prize: $17,500; Format: 64MS/32WS/32MD/32WD/32XD	(Chinese Taipei) Lin Yu-chieh (Chinese Taipei) Lee Chih-chen	(Australia) Andika Ramadiansyah (Australia) Nozomi Shimizu
29 September	North Harbour International: Dates: 1 October – 5 October; Host: Auckland, New Zealand; Venue: Badminton North Harbour Centre; Level: International Challenge; Prize: $17,500; Format: 64MS/32WS/32MD/32WD/32XD	Score: 21–14, 21–10	
29 September	Uganda International: Dates: 2 October – 5 October; Host: Kampala, Uganda; Venue: Lugogo Indoor Arena; Level: International Series; Prize: $10,000; Format: 32MS/32WS/16MD/8WD/16XD	(Myanmar) Hein Htut	(Malaysia) Ariffin Zakaria
29 September	Uganda International: Dates: 2 October – 5 October; Host: Kampala, Uganda; Venue: Lugogo Indoor Arena; Level: International Series; Prize: $10,000; Format: 32MS/32WS/16MD/8WD/16XD	Score: 21–9, 21–15	
29 September	Uganda International: Dates: 2 October – 5 October; Host: Kampala, Uganda; Venue: Lugogo Indoor Arena; Level: International Series; Prize: $10,000; Format: 32MS/32WS/16MD/8WD/16XD	(India) Rujula Ramu	(Malaysia) Joanne Ng
29 September	Uganda International: Dates: 2 October – 5 October; Host: Kampala, Uganda; Venue: Lugogo Indoor Arena; Level: International Series; Prize: $10,000; Format: 32MS/32WS/16MD/8WD/16XD	Score: 21–12, 21–12	
29 September	Uganda International: Dates: 2 October – 5 October; Host: Kampala, Uganda; Venue: Lugogo Indoor Arena; Level: International Series; Prize: $10,000; Format: 32MS/32WS/16MD/8WD/16XD	(Malaysia) Ashraf Zakaria (Malaysia) Ariffin Zakaria	(India) Tanmoy Bikash Boruah (India) Kuldeep Kamal
29 September	Uganda International: Dates: 2 October – 5 October; Host: Kampala, Uganda; Venue: Lugogo Indoor Arena; Level: International Series; Prize: $10,000; Format: 32MS/32WS/16MD/8WD/16XD	Score: 22–20, 21–14	
29 September	Uganda International: Dates: 2 October – 5 October; Host: Kampala, Uganda; Venue: Lugogo Indoor Arena; Level: International Series; Prize: $10,000; Format: 32MS/32WS/16MD/8WD/16XD	(Switzerland) Jenjira Stadelmann (Switzerland) Leila Zarrouk	(Uganda) Fadilah Mohamed Rafi (Uganda) Tracy Naluwooza
29 September	Uganda International: Dates: 2 October – 5 October; Host: Kampala, Uganda; Venue: Lugogo Indoor Arena; Level: International Series; Prize: $10,000; Format: 32MS/32WS/16MD/8WD/16XD	Score: 21–13, 21–5	
29 September	Uganda International: Dates: 2 October – 5 October; Host: Kampala, Uganda; Venue: Lugogo Indoor Arena; Level: International Series; Prize: $10,000; Format: 32MS/32WS/16MD/8WD/16XD	(Malaysia) Chong Zi Xiang (Malaysia) Joanne Ng	(India) Kuldeep Kamal (India) Aheri Paul
29 September	Uganda International: Dates: 2 October – 5 October; Host: Kampala, Uganda; Venue: Lugogo Indoor Arena; Level: International Series; Prize: $10,000; Format: 32MS/32WS/16MD/8WD/16XD	Score: 21–17, 22–20	
29 September	Bulgarian International: Dates: 2 October – 5 October; Host: Sofia, Bulgaria; Venue: Badminton Hall "Europe"; Level: Future Series; Format: 32MS/32WS/24MD/24WD/24XD	(Bulgaria) Dimitar Yanakiev	(France) Yohan Barbieri
29 September	Bulgarian International: Dates: 2 October – 5 October; Host: Sofia, Bulgaria; Venue: Badminton Hall "Europe"; Level: Future Series; Format: 32MS/32WS/24MD/24WD/24XD	Score: 21–16, 21–13	
29 September	Bulgarian International: Dates: 2 October – 5 October; Host: Sofia, Bulgaria; Venue: Badminton Hall "Europe"; Level: Future Series; Format: 32MS/32WS/24MD/24WD/24XD	(Turkey) Zehra Erdem	(India) Durga Esha Kandrapu
29 September	Bulgarian International: Dates: 2 October – 5 October; Host: Sofia, Bulgaria; Venue: Badminton Hall "Europe"; Level: Future Series; Format: 32MS/32WS/24MD/24WD/24XD	Score: 21–19, 21–14	
29 September	Bulgarian International: Dates: 2 October – 5 October; Host: Sofia, Bulgaria; Venue: Badminton Hall "Europe"; Level: Future Series; Format: 32MS/32WS/24MD/24WD/24XD	(Poland) Adrian Krawczyk (Poland) Szymon Ślepecki	(Serbia) Andrija Doder (Serbia) Sergej Lukić
29 September	Bulgarian International: Dates: 2 October – 5 October; Host: Sofia, Bulgaria; Venue: Badminton Hall "Europe"; Level: Future Series; Format: 32MS/32WS/24MD/24WD/24XD	Score: 13–21, 21–6, 21–12	
29 September	Bulgarian International: Dates: 2 October – 5 October; Host: Sofia, Bulgaria; Venue: Badminton Hall "Europe"; Level: Future Series; Format: 32MS/32WS/24MD/24WD/24XD	(Czech Republic) Kateřina Osladilová (Czech Republic) Sharleen van Coppenolle	(Poland) Anastasia Khomich (Poland) Ulyana Volskaya
29 September	Bulgarian International: Dates: 2 October – 5 October; Host: Sofia, Bulgaria; Venue: Badminton Hall "Europe"; Level: Future Series; Format: 32MS/32WS/24MD/24WD/24XD	Score: 21–13, 10–21, 6–15 retired	
29 September	Bulgarian International: Dates: 2 October – 5 October; Host: Sofia, Bulgaria; Venue: Badminton Hall "Europe"; Level: Future Series; Format: 32MS/32WS/24MD/24WD/24XD	(Serbia) Andrija Doder (Serbia) Sara Lončar	(Poland) Szymon Ślepecki (Poland) Anastasia Khomich
29 September	Bulgarian International: Dates: 2 October – 5 October; Host: Sofia, Bulgaria; Venue: Badminton Hall "Europe"; Level: Future Series; Format: 32MS/32WS/24MD/24WD/24XD	Score: 21–13, 10–21, 21–15	

=== October ===
Week commencing	Tournament	Champions	Runners-up
6 October	Arctic Open (Draw): Dates: 7 October – 12 October; Host: Vantaa, Finland; Venue: Energia Areena; Level: Super 500; Prize: $475,000; Format: 32MS/32WS/32MD/32WD/32XD	(Chinese Taipei) Chou Tien-chen	(Thailand) Kunlavut Vitidsarn
6 October	Arctic Open (Draw): Dates: 7 October – 12 October; Host: Vantaa, Finland; Venue: Energia Areena; Level: Super 500; Prize: $475,000; Format: 32MS/32WS/32MD/32WD/32XD	Score: 21–11, 13–21, 21–19	
6 October	Arctic Open (Draw): Dates: 7 October – 12 October; Host: Vantaa, Finland; Venue: Energia Areena; Level: Super 500; Prize: $475,000; Format: 32MS/32WS/32MD/32WD/32XD	(Japan) Akane Yamaguchi	(Thailand) Busanan Ongbamrungphan
6 October	Arctic Open (Draw): Dates: 7 October – 12 October; Host: Vantaa, Finland; Venue: Energia Areena; Level: Super 500; Prize: $475,000; Format: 32MS/32WS/32MD/32WD/32XD	Score: 21–19, 21–16	
6 October	Arctic Open (Draw): Dates: 7 October – 12 October; Host: Vantaa, Finland; Venue: Energia Areena; Level: Super 500; Prize: $475,000; Format: 32MS/32WS/32MD/32WD/32XD	(England) Ben Lane (England) Sean Vendy	(Malaysia) Aaron Chia (Malaysia) Soh Wooi Yik
6 October	Arctic Open (Draw): Dates: 7 October – 12 October; Host: Vantaa, Finland; Venue: Energia Areena; Level: Super 500; Prize: $475,000; Format: 32MS/32WS/32MD/32WD/32XD	Score: 21–18, 25–27, 21–17	
6 October	Arctic Open (Draw): Dates: 7 October – 12 October; Host: Vantaa, Finland; Venue: Energia Areena; Level: Super 500; Prize: $475,000; Format: 32MS/32WS/32MD/32WD/32XD	(Malaysia) Pearly Tan (Malaysia) Thinaah Muralitharan	(Japan) Rin Iwanaga (Japan) Kie Nakanishi
6 October	Arctic Open (Draw): Dates: 7 October – 12 October; Host: Vantaa, Finland; Venue: Energia Areena; Level: Super 500; Prize: $475,000; Format: 32MS/32WS/32MD/32WD/32XD	Score: 21–7, 21–9	
6 October	Arctic Open (Draw): Dates: 7 October – 12 October; Host: Vantaa, Finland; Venue: Energia Areena; Level: Super 500; Prize: $475,000; Format: 32MS/32WS/32MD/32WD/32XD	(China) Jiang Zhenbang (China) Wei Yaxin	(China) Feng Yanzhe (China) Huang Dongping
6 October	Arctic Open (Draw): Dates: 7 October – 12 October; Host: Vantaa, Finland; Venue: Energia Areena; Level: Super 500; Prize: $475,000; Format: 32MS/32WS/32MD/32WD/32XD	Score: 21–19, 24–22	
6 October	Türkiye International: Dates: 8 October – 12 October; Host: Istanbul, Turkey; Venue: Ata Sporları Merkezi; Level: International Challenge; Prize: $17,500; Format: 32MS/32WS/24MD/24WD/24XD	(England) Harry Huang	(Indonesia) Muhamad Yusuf
6 October	Türkiye International: Dates: 8 October – 12 October; Host: Istanbul, Turkey; Venue: Ata Sporları Merkezi; Level: International Challenge; Prize: $17,500; Format: 32MS/32WS/24MD/24WD/24XD	Score: 21–19, 11–21, 21–16	
6 October	Türkiye International: Dates: 8 October – 12 October; Host: Istanbul, Turkey; Venue: Ata Sporları Merkezi; Level: International Challenge; Prize: $17,500; Format: 32MS/32WS/24MD/24WD/24XD	(Turkey) Neslihan Arın	(Japan) Nanami Someya
6 October	Türkiye International: Dates: 8 October – 12 October; Host: Istanbul, Turkey; Venue: Ata Sporları Merkezi; Level: International Challenge; Prize: $17,500; Format: 32MS/32WS/24MD/24WD/24XD	Score: 21–7, 21–4	
6 October	Türkiye International: Dates: 8 October – 12 October; Host: Istanbul, Turkey; Venue: Ata Sporları Merkezi; Level: International Challenge; Prize: $17,500; Format: 32MS/32WS/24MD/24WD/24XD	(India) Hariharan Amsakarunan (India) Arjun M. R.	(Japan) Yuto Noda (Japan) Shunya Ota
6 October	Türkiye International: Dates: 8 October – 12 October; Host: Istanbul, Turkey; Venue: Ata Sporları Merkezi; Level: International Challenge; Prize: $17,500; Format: 32MS/32WS/24MD/24WD/24XD	Score: 21–13, 21–6	
6 October	Türkiye International: Dates: 8 October – 12 October; Host: Istanbul, Turkey; Venue: Ata Sporları Merkezi; Level: International Challenge; Prize: $17,500; Format: 32MS/32WS/24MD/24WD/24XD	(Bulgaria) Gabriela Stoeva (Bulgaria) Stefani Stoeva	(Turkey) Bengisu Erçetin (Turkey) Nazlıcan İnci
6 October	Türkiye International: Dates: 8 October – 12 October; Host: Istanbul, Turkey; Venue: Ata Sporları Merkezi; Level: International Challenge; Prize: $17,500; Format: 32MS/32WS/24MD/24WD/24XD	Score: 21–10, 21–19	
6 October	Türkiye International: Dates: 8 October – 12 October; Host: Istanbul, Turkey; Venue: Ata Sporları Merkezi; Level: International Challenge; Prize: $17,500; Format: 32MS/32WS/24MD/24WD/24XD	(India) Hariharan Amsakarunan (India) Treesa Jolly	(Indonesia) M. Nawaf Khoiriyansyah (Indonesia) Nahya Muhyifa
6 October	Türkiye International: Dates: 8 October – 12 October; Host: Istanbul, Turkey; Venue: Ata Sporları Merkezi; Level: International Challenge; Prize: $17,500; Format: 32MS/32WS/24MD/24WD/24XD	Score: 21–14, 18–21, 21–11	
6 October	Sydney International: Dates: 8 October – 12 October; Host: Lidcombe, New South Wales, Australia; Venue: Roketto Badminton Centre; Level: International Challenge; Prize: $17,500; Format: 64MS/32WS/32MD/32WD/32XD	(Chinese Taipei) Wang Yu-kai	(Chinese Taipei) Liao Jhuo-fu
6 October	Sydney International: Dates: 8 October – 12 October; Host: Lidcombe, New South Wales, Australia; Venue: Roketto Badminton Centre; Level: International Challenge; Prize: $17,500; Format: 64MS/32WS/32MD/32WD/32XD	Score: 15–10, 15–10	
6 October	Sydney International: Dates: 8 October – 12 October; Host: Lidcombe, New South Wales, Australia; Venue: Roketto Badminton Centre; Level: International Challenge; Prize: $17,500; Format: 64MS/32WS/32MD/32WD/32XD	(Chinese Taipei) Chen Su-yu	(Japan) Niina Matsuta
6 October	Sydney International: Dates: 8 October – 12 October; Host: Lidcombe, New South Wales, Australia; Venue: Roketto Badminton Centre; Level: International Challenge; Prize: $17,500; Format: 64MS/32WS/32MD/32WD/32XD	Score: 9–15, 15–9, 15–9	
6 October	Sydney International: Dates: 8 October – 12 October; Host: Lidcombe, New South Wales, Australia; Venue: Roketto Badminton Centre; Level: International Challenge; Prize: $17,500; Format: 64MS/32WS/32MD/32WD/32XD	(Japan) Haruki Kawabe (Japan) Kenta Matsukawa	(Chinese Taipei) Chen Bo-yuan (Chinese Taipei) Tang Kai-wei
6 October	Sydney International: Dates: 8 October – 12 October; Host: Lidcombe, New South Wales, Australia; Venue: Roketto Badminton Centre; Level: International Challenge; Prize: $17,500; Format: 64MS/32WS/32MD/32WD/32XD	Score: 15–13, 15–5	
6 October	Sydney International: Dates: 8 October – 12 October; Host: Lidcombe, New South Wales, Australia; Venue: Roketto Badminton Centre; Level: International Challenge; Prize: $17,500; Format: 64MS/32WS/32MD/32WD/32XD	(Chinese Taipei) Chen Su-yu (Chinese Taipei) Hsieh Yi-en	(Australia) Gronya Somerville (Australia) Angela Yu
6 October	Sydney International: Dates: 8 October – 12 October; Host: Lidcombe, New South Wales, Australia; Venue: Roketto Badminton Centre; Level: International Challenge; Prize: $17,500; Format: 64MS/32WS/32MD/32WD/32XD	Score: 8–15, 15–13, 15–9	
6 October	Sydney International: Dates: 8 October – 12 October; Host: Lidcombe, New South Wales, Australia; Venue: Roketto Badminton Centre; Level: International Challenge; Prize: $17,500; Format: 64MS/32WS/32MD/32WD/32XD	(Chinese Taipei) Wu Guan-xun (Chinese Taipei) Lee Chia-hsin	(Chinese Taipei) Chen Bo-yuan (Chinese Taipei) Sung Yi-hsuan
6 October	Sydney International: Dates: 8 October – 12 October; Host: Lidcombe, New South Wales, Australia; Venue: Roketto Badminton Centre; Level: International Challenge; Prize: $17,500; Format: 64MS/32WS/32MD/32WD/32XD	Score: 15–10, 15–11	
6 October	Algeria International: Dates: 9 October – 12 October; Host: Bir El Djir, Oran, Algeria; Venue: Bir El Djir Sports Hall; Level: International Series; Prize: $5,000; Format: 32MS/32WS/32MD/32WD/32XD	(Italy) Fabio Caponio	(Netherlands) Noah Haase
6 October	Algeria International: Dates: 9 October – 12 October; Host: Bir El Djir, Oran, Algeria; Venue: Bir El Djir Sports Hall; Level: International Series; Prize: $5,000; Format: 32MS/32WS/32MD/32WD/32XD	Score: 21–8, 9–21, 23–21	
6 October	Algeria International: Dates: 9 October – 12 October; Host: Bir El Djir, Oran, Algeria; Venue: Bir El Djir Sports Hall; Level: International Series; Prize: $5,000; Format: 32MS/32WS/32MD/32WD/32XD	(Croatia) Jelena Buchberger	(Czech Republic) Sharleen van Coppenolle
6 October	Algeria International: Dates: 9 October – 12 October; Host: Bir El Djir, Oran, Algeria; Venue: Bir El Djir Sports Hall; Level: International Series; Prize: $5,000; Format: 32MS/32WS/32MD/32WD/32XD	Score: 21–9, 21–10	
6 October	Algeria International: Dates: 9 October – 12 October; Host: Bir El Djir, Oran, Algeria; Venue: Bir El Djir Sports Hall; Level: International Series; Prize: $5,000; Format: 32MS/32WS/32MD/32WD/32XD	(Algeria) Koceila Mammeri (Algeria) Youcef Sabri Medel	(Belgium) Iljo van Delsen (Belgium) Yaro van Delsen
6 October	Algeria International: Dates: 9 October – 12 October; Host: Bir El Djir, Oran, Algeria; Venue: Bir El Djir Sports Hall; Level: International Series; Prize: $5,000; Format: 32MS/32WS/32MD/32WD/32XD	Score: 21–19, 21–18	
6 October	Algeria International: Dates: 9 October – 12 October; Host: Bir El Djir, Oran, Algeria; Venue: Bir El Djir Sports Hall; Level: International Series; Prize: $5,000; Format: 32MS/32WS/32MD/32WD/32XD	(Italy) Martina Corsini (Italy) Emma Piccinin	(Croatia) Jelena Buchberger (Czech Republic) Sharleen van Coppenolle
6 October	Algeria International: Dates: 9 October – 12 October; Host: Bir El Djir, Oran, Algeria; Venue: Bir El Djir Sports Hall; Level: International Series; Prize: $5,000; Format: 32MS/32WS/32MD/32WD/32XD	Score: 22–20, 21–16	
6 October	Algeria International: Dates: 9 October – 12 October; Host: Bir El Djir, Oran, Algeria; Venue: Bir El Djir Sports Hall; Level: International Series; Prize: $5,000; Format: 32MS/32WS/32MD/32WD/32XD	(Algeria) Koceila Mammeri (Algeria) Tanina Mammeri	(Switzerland) Nicolas Franconville (Switzerland) Julie Franconville
6 October	Algeria International: Dates: 9 October – 12 October; Host: Bir El Djir, Oran, Algeria; Venue: Bir El Djir Sports Hall; Level: International Series; Prize: $5,000; Format: 32MS/32WS/32MD/32WD/32XD	Score: 21–15, 21–12	
13 October	Denmark Open (Draw): Dates: 14 October – 19 October; Host: Odense, Denmark; Venue: Arena Fyn; Level: Super 750; Prize: $950,000; Format: 32MS/32WS/32MD/32WD/32XD	(Indonesia) Jonatan Christie	(China) Shi Yuqi
13 October	Denmark Open (Draw): Dates: 14 October – 19 October; Host: Odense, Denmark; Venue: Arena Fyn; Level: Super 750; Prize: $950,000; Format: 32MS/32WS/32MD/32WD/32XD	Score: 13–21, 21–15, 21–15	
13 October	Denmark Open (Draw): Dates: 14 October – 19 October; Host: Odense, Denmark; Venue: Arena Fyn; Level: Super 750; Prize: $950,000; Format: 32MS/32WS/32MD/32WD/32XD	(South Korea) An Se-young	(China) Wang Zhiyi
13 October	Denmark Open (Draw): Dates: 14 October – 19 October; Host: Odense, Denmark; Venue: Arena Fyn; Level: Super 750; Prize: $950,000; Format: 32MS/32WS/32MD/32WD/32XD	Score: 21–5, 24–22	
13 October	Denmark Open (Draw): Dates: 14 October – 19 October; Host: Odense, Denmark; Venue: Arena Fyn; Level: Super 750; Prize: $950,000; Format: 32MS/32WS/32MD/32WD/32XD	(Japan) Takuro Hoki (Japan) Yugo Kobayashi	(Indonesia) Fajar Alfian (Indonesia) Muhammad Shohibul Fikri
13 October	Denmark Open (Draw): Dates: 14 October – 19 October; Host: Odense, Denmark; Venue: Arena Fyn; Level: Super 750; Prize: $950,000; Format: 32MS/32WS/32MD/32WD/32XD	Score: 21–18, 15–21, 21–19	
13 October	Denmark Open (Draw): Dates: 14 October – 19 October; Host: Odense, Denmark; Venue: Arena Fyn; Level: Super 750; Prize: $950,000; Format: 32MS/32WS/32MD/32WD/32XD	(South Korea) Baek Ha-na (South Korea) Lee So-hee	(South Korea) Kim Hye-jeong (South Korea) Kong Hee-yong
13 October	Denmark Open (Draw): Dates: 14 October – 19 October; Host: Odense, Denmark; Venue: Arena Fyn; Level: Super 750; Prize: $950,000; Format: 32MS/32WS/32MD/32WD/32XD	Score: 15–21, 21–14, 21–15	
13 October	Denmark Open (Draw): Dates: 14 October – 19 October; Host: Odense, Denmark; Venue: Arena Fyn; Level: Super 750; Prize: $950,000; Format: 32MS/32WS/32MD/32WD/32XD	(China) Feng Yanzhe (China) Huang Dongping	(China) Jiang Zhenbang (China) Wei Yaxin
13 October	Denmark Open (Draw): Dates: 14 October – 19 October; Host: Odense, Denmark; Venue: Arena Fyn; Level: Super 750; Prize: $950,000; Format: 32MS/32WS/32MD/32WD/32XD	Score: 21–13, 21–9	
13 October	Malaysia Super 100 (Draw): Dates: 14 October – 19 October; Host: Iskandar Puteri, Johor, Malaysia; Venue: EduCity Sports Complex; Level: Super 100; Prize: $110,000; Format: 48MS/32WS/32MD/32WD/32XD	(China) Dong Tianyao	(Japan) Yudai Okimoto
13 October	Malaysia Super 100 (Draw): Dates: 14 October – 19 October; Host: Iskandar Puteri, Johor, Malaysia; Venue: EduCity Sports Complex; Level: Super 100; Prize: $110,000; Format: 48MS/32WS/32MD/32WD/32XD	Score: 21–14, 21–17	
13 October	Malaysia Super 100 (Draw): Dates: 14 October – 19 October; Host: Iskandar Puteri, Johor, Malaysia; Venue: EduCity Sports Complex; Level: Super 100; Prize: $110,000; Format: 48MS/32WS/32MD/32WD/32XD	(Japan) Nozomi Okuhara	(Malaysia) Wong Ling Ching
13 October	Malaysia Super 100 (Draw): Dates: 14 October – 19 October; Host: Iskandar Puteri, Johor, Malaysia; Venue: EduCity Sports Complex; Level: Super 100; Prize: $110,000; Format: 48MS/32WS/32MD/32WD/32XD	Score: 21–18, 21–11	
13 October	Malaysia Super 100 (Draw): Dates: 14 October – 19 October; Host: Iskandar Puteri, Johor, Malaysia; Venue: EduCity Sports Complex; Level: Super 100; Prize: $110,000; Format: 48MS/32WS/32MD/32WD/32XD	(Malaysia) Kang Khai Xing (Malaysia) Aaron Tai	(Malaysia) Chia Wei Jie (Malaysia) Lwi Sheng Hao
13 October	Malaysia Super 100 (Draw): Dates: 14 October – 19 October; Host: Iskandar Puteri, Johor, Malaysia; Venue: EduCity Sports Complex; Level: Super 100; Prize: $110,000; Format: 48MS/32WS/32MD/32WD/32XD	Score: 21–18, 21–7	
13 October	Malaysia Super 100 (Draw): Dates: 14 October – 19 October; Host: Iskandar Puteri, Johor, Malaysia; Venue: EduCity Sports Complex; Level: Super 100; Prize: $110,000; Format: 48MS/32WS/32MD/32WD/32XD	(China) Luo Yi (China) Wang Tingge	(Indonesia) Siti Sarah Azzahra (Indonesia) Az Zahra Ditya Ramadhani
13 October	Malaysia Super 100 (Draw): Dates: 14 October – 19 October; Host: Iskandar Puteri, Johor, Malaysia; Venue: EduCity Sports Complex; Level: Super 100; Prize: $110,000; Format: 48MS/32WS/32MD/32WD/32XD	Score: 21–13, 21–12	
13 October	Malaysia Super 100 (Draw): Dates: 14 October – 19 October; Host: Iskandar Puteri, Johor, Malaysia; Venue: EduCity Sports Complex; Level: Super 100; Prize: $110,000; Format: 48MS/32WS/32MD/32WD/32XD	(Japan) Yuta Watanabe (Japan) Maya Taguchi	(Indonesia) Dejan Ferdinansyah (Indonesia) Bernadine Wardana
13 October	Malaysia Super 100 (Draw): Dates: 14 October – 19 October; Host: Iskandar Puteri, Johor, Malaysia; Venue: EduCity Sports Complex; Level: Super 100; Prize: $110,000; Format: 48MS/32WS/32MD/32WD/32XD	Score: 21–18, 21–12	
13 October	Egypt International: Dates: 14 October – 18 October; Host: Cairo, Egypt; Venue: Police Sports Federation; Level: International Series; Prize: $10,000; Format: 32MS/32WS/32MD/32WD/32XD	(Italy) Giovanni Toti	(Canada) Xiaodong Sheng
13 October	Egypt International: Dates: 14 October – 18 October; Host: Cairo, Egypt; Venue: Police Sports Federation; Level: International Series; Prize: $10,000; Format: 32MS/32WS/32MD/32WD/32XD	Score: 21–15, 20–22, 22–20	
13 October	Egypt International: Dates: 14 October – 18 October; Host: Cairo, Egypt; Venue: Police Sports Federation; Level: International Series; Prize: $10,000; Format: 32MS/32WS/32MD/32WD/32XD	(India) Meghana Reddy	(Malaysia) Joanne Ng
13 October	Egypt International: Dates: 14 October – 18 October; Host: Cairo, Egypt; Venue: Police Sports Federation; Level: International Series; Prize: $10,000; Format: 32MS/32WS/32MD/32WD/32XD	Score: 21–15, 21–17	
13 October	Egypt International: Dates: 14 October – 18 October; Host: Cairo, Egypt; Venue: Police Sports Federation; Level: International Series; Prize: $10,000; Format: 32MS/32WS/32MD/32WD/32XD	(Algeria) Koceila Mammeri (Algeria) Youcef Sabri Medel	(Malaysia) Ashraf Zakaria (Malaysia) Ariffin Zakaria
13 October	Egypt International: Dates: 14 October – 18 October; Host: Cairo, Egypt; Venue: Police Sports Federation; Level: International Series; Prize: $10,000; Format: 32MS/32WS/32MD/32WD/32XD	Score: 21–5, 21–14	
13 October	Egypt International: Dates: 14 October – 18 October; Host: Cairo, Egypt; Venue: Police Sports Federation; Level: International Series; Prize: $10,000; Format: 32MS/32WS/32MD/32WD/32XD	(Switzerland) Lucie Amiguet (Switzerland) Caroline Racloz	(Netherlands) Kirsten de Wit (Netherlands) Meerte Loos
13 October	Egypt International: Dates: 14 October – 18 October; Host: Cairo, Egypt; Venue: Police Sports Federation; Level: International Series; Prize: $10,000; Format: 32MS/32WS/32MD/32WD/32XD	Score: 20–22, 21–19, 28–26	
13 October	Egypt International: Dates: 14 October – 18 October; Host: Cairo, Egypt; Venue: Police Sports Federation; Level: International Series; Prize: $10,000; Format: 32MS/32WS/32MD/32WD/32XD	(Algeria) Koceila Mammeri (Algeria) Tanina Mammeri	(France) Aymeric Tores (Netherlands) Kirsten de Wit
13 October	Egypt International: Dates: 14 October – 18 October; Host: Cairo, Egypt; Venue: Police Sports Federation; Level: International Series; Prize: $10,000; Format: 32MS/32WS/32MD/32WD/32XD	Score: 21–16, 21–18	
13 October	Bendigo International: Dates: 15 October – 19 October; Host: Bendigo, Victoria, Australia; Venue: Bendigo Eaglehawk Badminton Association; Level: International Challenge; Prize: $17,500; Format: 64MS/32WS/32MD/32WD/32XD	(Japan) Toma Noda	(Chinese Taipei) Wang Yu-kai
13 October	Bendigo International: Dates: 15 October – 19 October; Host: Bendigo, Victoria, Australia; Venue: Bendigo Eaglehawk Badminton Association; Level: International Challenge; Prize: $17,500; Format: 64MS/32WS/32MD/32WD/32XD	Score: 21–19, 21–7	
13 October	Bendigo International: Dates: 15 October – 19 October; Host: Bendigo, Victoria, Australia; Venue: Bendigo Eaglehawk Badminton Association; Level: International Challenge; Prize: $17,500; Format: 64MS/32WS/32MD/32WD/32XD	(Japan) Nodoka Sunakawa	(Japan) Niina Matsuta
13 October	Bendigo International: Dates: 15 October – 19 October; Host: Bendigo, Victoria, Australia; Venue: Bendigo Eaglehawk Badminton Association; Level: International Challenge; Prize: $17,500; Format: 64MS/32WS/32MD/32WD/32XD	Score: 21–10, 16–21, 21–15	
13 October	Bendigo International: Dates: 15 October – 19 October; Host: Bendigo, Victoria, Australia; Venue: Bendigo Eaglehawk Badminton Association; Level: International Challenge; Prize: $17,500; Format: 64MS/32WS/32MD/32WD/32XD	(Chinese Taipei) Chen Zhi-ray (Chinese Taipei) Lin Yu-chieh	(Japan) Masayuki Onodera (Japan) Daigo Tanioka
13 October	Bendigo International: Dates: 15 October – 19 October; Host: Bendigo, Victoria, Australia; Venue: Bendigo Eaglehawk Badminton Association; Level: International Challenge; Prize: $17,500; Format: 64MS/32WS/32MD/32WD/32XD	Score: 17–21, 23–21, 23–21	
13 October	Bendigo International: Dates: 15 October – 19 October; Host: Bendigo, Victoria, Australia; Venue: Bendigo Eaglehawk Badminton Association; Level: International Challenge; Prize: $17,500; Format: 64MS/32WS/32MD/32WD/32XD	(Chinese Taipei) Sung Yi-hsuan (Chinese Taipei) Tsai Hsin-pei	(Chinese Taipei) Lee Chih-chen (Chinese Taipei) Lin Yen-yu
13 October	Bendigo International: Dates: 15 October – 19 October; Host: Bendigo, Victoria, Australia; Venue: Bendigo Eaglehawk Badminton Association; Level: International Challenge; Prize: $17,500; Format: 64MS/32WS/32MD/32WD/32XD	Score: 21–17, 21–19	
13 October	Bendigo International: Dates: 15 October – 19 October; Host: Bendigo, Victoria, Australia; Venue: Bendigo Eaglehawk Badminton Association; Level: International Challenge; Prize: $17,500; Format: 64MS/32WS/32MD/32WD/32XD	(Chinese Taipei) Wu Guan-xun (Chinese Taipei) Lee Chia-hsin	(Chinese Taipei) Chen Hung-ming (Chinese Taipei) Chang Yun-jung
13 October	Bendigo International: Dates: 15 October – 19 October; Host: Bendigo, Victoria, Australia; Venue: Bendigo Eaglehawk Badminton Association; Level: International Challenge; Prize: $17,500; Format: 64MS/32WS/32MD/32WD/32XD	Score: 21–9, 21–8	
13 October	Santo Domingo Open: Dates: 15 October – 19 October; Host: Santo Domingo, Dominican Republic; Venue: Sport Hall New Horizons School; Level: International Series; Prize: $5,000; Format: 32MS/32WS/16MD/16WD/32XD	(Brazil) Jonathan Matias	(United States) Mark Alcala
13 October	Santo Domingo Open: Dates: 15 October – 19 October; Host: Santo Domingo, Dominican Republic; Venue: Sport Hall New Horizons School; Level: International Series; Prize: $5,000; Format: 32MS/32WS/16MD/16WD/32XD	Score: 21–15, 16–21, 21–12	
13 October	Santo Domingo Open: Dates: 15 October – 19 October; Host: Santo Domingo, Dominican Republic; Venue: Sport Hall New Horizons School; Level: International Series; Prize: $5,000; Format: 32MS/32WS/16MD/16WD/32XD	(United States) Ella Lin	(United States) Disha Gupta
13 October	Santo Domingo Open: Dates: 15 October – 19 October; Host: Santo Domingo, Dominican Republic; Venue: Sport Hall New Horizons School; Level: International Series; Prize: $5,000; Format: 32MS/32WS/16MD/16WD/32XD	Score: 21–12, 21–10	
13 October	Santo Domingo Open: Dates: 15 October – 19 October; Host: Santo Domingo, Dominican Republic; Venue: Sport Hall New Horizons School; Level: International Series; Prize: $5,000; Format: 32MS/32WS/16MD/16WD/32XD	(Canada) Clarence Chau (Canada) Wong Yan Kit	(Canada) Philippe Bélanger (Canada) Nicolas Germain
13 October	Santo Domingo Open: Dates: 15 October – 19 October; Host: Santo Domingo, Dominican Republic; Venue: Sport Hall New Horizons School; Level: International Series; Prize: $5,000; Format: 32MS/32WS/16MD/16WD/32XD	Score: 21–19, 21–11	
13 October	Santo Domingo Open: Dates: 15 October – 19 October; Host: Santo Domingo, Dominican Republic; Venue: Sport Hall New Horizons School; Level: International Series; Prize: $5,000; Format: 32MS/32WS/16MD/16WD/32XD	(Dominican Republic) Clarisa Pie (Dominican Republic) Nairoby Abigail Jiménez	(Dominican Republic) Alissa Acosta (Dominican Republic) Daniela Acosta
13 October	Santo Domingo Open: Dates: 15 October – 19 October; Host: Santo Domingo, Dominican Republic; Venue: Sport Hall New Horizons School; Level: International Series; Prize: $5,000; Format: 32MS/32WS/16MD/16WD/32XD	Score: 21–13, 28–26	
13 October	Santo Domingo Open: Dates: 15 October – 19 October; Host: Santo Domingo, Dominican Republic; Venue: Sport Hall New Horizons School; Level: International Series; Prize: $5,000; Format: 32MS/32WS/16MD/16WD/32XD	(United States) Adrian Mar (United States) Ella Lin	(Belgium) Charles Fouyn (Canada) Katie Watson
13 October	Santo Domingo Open: Dates: 15 October – 19 October; Host: Santo Domingo, Dominican Republic; Venue: Sport Hall New Horizons School; Level: International Series; Prize: $5,000; Format: 32MS/32WS/16MD/16WD/32XD	Score: 21–5, 21–10	
13 October	Czech Open: Dates: 16 October – 19 October; Host: Prague, Czech Republic; Venue: Sports hall Řepy; Level: International Challenge; Prize: $17,500; Format: 32MS/32WS/24MD/24WD/24XD	(Indonesia) Muhamad Yusuf	(England) Harry Huang
13 October	Czech Open: Dates: 16 October – 19 October; Host: Prague, Czech Republic; Venue: Sports hall Řepy; Level: International Challenge; Prize: $17,500; Format: 32MS/32WS/24MD/24WD/24XD	Score: 21–14, 21–12	
13 October	Czech Open: Dates: 16 October – 19 October; Host: Prague, Czech Republic; Venue: Sports hall Řepy; Level: International Challenge; Prize: $17,500; Format: 32MS/32WS/24MD/24WD/24XD	(Bulgaria) Kaloyana Nalbantova	(Denmark) Amalie Schulz
13 October	Czech Open: Dates: 16 October – 19 October; Host: Prague, Czech Republic; Venue: Sports hall Řepy; Level: International Challenge; Prize: $17,500; Format: 32MS/32WS/24MD/24WD/24XD	Score: 21–14, 12–21, 21–16	
13 October	Czech Open: Dates: 16 October – 19 October; Host: Prague, Czech Republic; Venue: Sports hall Řepy; Level: International Challenge; Prize: $17,500; Format: 32MS/32WS/24MD/24WD/24XD	(Denmark) Rasmus Espersen (Denmark) Andreas Søndergaard	(Japan) Yuto Noda (Japan) Shunya Ota
13 October	Czech Open: Dates: 16 October – 19 October; Host: Prague, Czech Republic; Venue: Sports hall Řepy; Level: International Challenge; Prize: $17,500; Format: 32MS/32WS/24MD/24WD/24XD	Score: 21–16, 21–14	
13 October	Czech Open: Dates: 16 October – 19 October; Host: Prague, Czech Republic; Venue: Sports hall Řepy; Level: International Challenge; Prize: $17,500; Format: 32MS/32WS/24MD/24WD/24XD	(Denmark) Natasja Anthonisen (Denmark) Amalie Cecilie Kudsk	(Sweden) Malena Norrman (Sweden) Tilda Sjöö
13 October	Czech Open: Dates: 16 October – 19 October; Host: Prague, Czech Republic; Venue: Sports hall Řepy; Level: International Challenge; Prize: $17,500; Format: 32MS/32WS/24MD/24WD/24XD	Score: 21–13, 21–11	
13 October	Czech Open: Dates: 16 October – 19 October; Host: Prague, Czech Republic; Venue: Sports hall Řepy; Level: International Challenge; Prize: $17,500; Format: 32MS/32WS/24MD/24WD/24XD	(Denmark) Rasmus Espersen (Denmark) Amalie Cecilie Kudsk	(Denmark) Calvin Lundsgaard (Denmark) Signe Schulz
13 October	Czech Open: Dates: 16 October – 19 October; Host: Prague, Czech Republic; Venue: Sports hall Řepy; Level: International Challenge; Prize: $17,500; Format: 32MS/32WS/24MD/24WD/24XD	Score: 21–17, 21–13	
20 October	French Open (Draw): Dates: 21 October – 26 October; Host: Cesson-Sévigné, France; Venue: Glaz Arena; Level: Super 750; Prize: $950,000; Format: 32MS/32WS/32MD/32WD/32XD	(Denmark) Anders Antonsen	(France) Christo Popov
20 October	French Open (Draw): Dates: 21 October – 26 October; Host: Cesson-Sévigné, France; Venue: Glaz Arena; Level: Super 750; Prize: $950,000; Format: 32MS/32WS/32MD/32WD/32XD	Score: 21–12, 21–19	
20 October	French Open (Draw): Dates: 21 October – 26 October; Host: Cesson-Sévigné, France; Venue: Glaz Arena; Level: Super 750; Prize: $950,000; Format: 32MS/32WS/32MD/32WD/32XD	(South Korea) An Se-young	(China) Wang Zhiyi
20 October	French Open (Draw): Dates: 21 October – 26 October; Host: Cesson-Sévigné, France; Venue: Glaz Arena; Level: Super 750; Prize: $950,000; Format: 32MS/32WS/32MD/32WD/32XD	Score: 21–13, 21–7	
20 October	French Open (Draw): Dates: 21 October – 26 October; Host: Cesson-Sévigné, France; Venue: Glaz Arena; Level: Super 750; Prize: $950,000; Format: 32MS/32WS/32MD/32WD/32XD	(South Korea) Kim Won-ho (South Korea) Seo Seung-jae	(Indonesia) Fajar Alfian (Indonesia) Muhammad Shohibul Fikri
20 October	French Open (Draw): Dates: 21 October – 26 October; Host: Cesson-Sévigné, France; Venue: Glaz Arena; Level: Super 750; Prize: $950,000; Format: 32MS/32WS/32MD/32WD/32XD	Score: 10–21, 21–13, 21–12	
20 October	French Open (Draw): Dates: 21 October – 26 October; Host: Cesson-Sévigné, France; Venue: Glaz Arena; Level: Super 750; Prize: $950,000; Format: 32MS/32WS/32MD/32WD/32XD	(Japan) Yuki Fukushima (Japan) Mayu Matsumoto	(China) Li Yijing (China) Luo Xumin
20 October	French Open (Draw): Dates: 21 October – 26 October; Host: Cesson-Sévigné, France; Venue: Glaz Arena; Level: Super 750; Prize: $950,000; Format: 32MS/32WS/32MD/32WD/32XD	Score: 17–21, 21–18, 21–15	
20 October	French Open (Draw): Dates: 21 October – 26 October; Host: Cesson-Sévigné, France; Venue: Glaz Arena; Level: Super 750; Prize: $950,000; Format: 32MS/32WS/32MD/32WD/32XD	(China) Feng Yanzhe (China) Huang Dongping	(Thailand) Dechapol Puavaranukroh (Thailand) Supissara Paewsampran
20 October	French Open (Draw): Dates: 21 October – 26 October; Host: Cesson-Sévigné, France; Venue: Glaz Arena; Level: Super 750; Prize: $950,000; Format: 32MS/32WS/32MD/32WD/32XD	Score: 27–25, 21–12	
20 October	Indonesia Masters Super 100 II (Draw): Dates: 21 October – 26 October; Host: Deli Serdang, North Sumatra, Indonesia; Venue: GOR PBSI Pancing; Level: Super 100; Prize: $110,000; Format: 48MS/32WS/32MD/32WD/32XD	(Indonesia) Zaki Ubaidillah	(China) Dong Tianyao
20 October	Indonesia Masters Super 100 II (Draw): Dates: 21 October – 26 October; Host: Deli Serdang, North Sumatra, Indonesia; Venue: GOR PBSI Pancing; Level: Super 100; Prize: $110,000; Format: 48MS/32WS/32MD/32WD/32XD	Score: 21–11, 21–8	
20 October	Indonesia Masters Super 100 II (Draw): Dates: 21 October – 26 October; Host: Deli Serdang, North Sumatra, Indonesia; Venue: GOR PBSI Pancing; Level: Super 100; Prize: $110,000; Format: 48MS/32WS/32MD/32WD/32XD	(Japan) Nozomi Okuhara	(India) Devika Sihag
20 October	Indonesia Masters Super 100 II (Draw): Dates: 21 October – 26 October; Host: Deli Serdang, North Sumatra, Indonesia; Venue: GOR PBSI Pancing; Level: Super 100; Prize: $110,000; Format: 48MS/32WS/32MD/32WD/32XD	Score: 21–11, 21–9	
20 October	Indonesia Masters Super 100 II (Draw): Dates: 21 October – 26 October; Host: Deli Serdang, North Sumatra, Indonesia; Venue: GOR PBSI Pancing; Level: Super 100; Prize: $110,000; Format: 48MS/32WS/32MD/32WD/32XD	(Indonesia) Raymond Indra (Indonesia) Nikolaus Joaquin	(South Korea) Choi Sol-gyu (Malaysia) Goh V Shem
20 October	Indonesia Masters Super 100 II (Draw): Dates: 21 October – 26 October; Host: Deli Serdang, North Sumatra, Indonesia; Venue: GOR PBSI Pancing; Level: Super 100; Prize: $110,000; Format: 48MS/32WS/32MD/32WD/32XD	Score: 21–18, 17–21, 24–22	
20 October	Indonesia Masters Super 100 II (Draw): Dates: 21 October – 26 October; Host: Deli Serdang, North Sumatra, Indonesia; Venue: GOR PBSI Pancing; Level: Super 100; Prize: $110,000; Format: 48MS/32WS/32MD/32WD/32XD	(Indonesia) Apriyani Rahayu (Indonesia) Siti Fadia Silva Ramadhanti	(Indonesia) Isyana Syahira Meida (Indonesia) Rinjani Kwinnara Nastine
20 October	Indonesia Masters Super 100 II (Draw): Dates: 21 October – 26 October; Host: Deli Serdang, North Sumatra, Indonesia; Venue: GOR PBSI Pancing; Level: Super 100; Prize: $110,000; Format: 48MS/32WS/32MD/32WD/32XD	Score: 21–11, 21–17	
20 October	Indonesia Masters Super 100 II (Draw): Dates: 21 October – 26 October; Host: Deli Serdang, North Sumatra, Indonesia; Venue: GOR PBSI Pancing; Level: Super 100; Prize: $110,000; Format: 48MS/32WS/32MD/32WD/32XD	(Indonesia) Marwan Faza (Indonesia) Aisyah Pranata	(Malaysia) Jimmy Wong (Malaysia) Lai Pei Jing
20 October	Indonesia Masters Super 100 II (Draw): Dates: 21 October – 26 October; Host: Deli Serdang, North Sumatra, Indonesia; Venue: GOR PBSI Pancing; Level: Super 100; Prize: $110,000; Format: 48MS/32WS/32MD/32WD/32XD	Score: 16–21, 21–19, 21–3	
20 October	Vietnam International (Ninh Bình): Dates: 21 October – 26 October; Host: Ninh Bình, Vietnam; Venue: Ninh Bình Sports Stadium; Level: International Series; Prize: $5,000; Format: 64MS/32WS/32MD/32WD/32XD	(Indonesia) Jelang Fajar	(Indonesia) Muhamad Rizky Akbar
20 October	Vietnam International (Ninh Bình): Dates: 21 October – 26 October; Host: Ninh Bình, Vietnam; Venue: Ninh Bình Sports Stadium; Level: International Series; Prize: $5,000; Format: 64MS/32WS/32MD/32WD/32XD	Score: 15–9, 15–10	
20 October	Vietnam International (Ninh Bình): Dates: 21 October – 26 October; Host: Ninh Bình, Vietnam; Venue: Ninh Bình Sports Stadium; Level: International Series; Prize: $5,000; Format: 64MS/32WS/32MD/32WD/32XD	(Vietnam) Vũ Thị Trang	(Malaysia) Oo Shan Zi
20 October	Vietnam International (Ninh Bình): Dates: 21 October – 26 October; Host: Ninh Bình, Vietnam; Venue: Ninh Bình Sports Stadium; Level: International Series; Prize: $5,000; Format: 64MS/32WS/32MD/32WD/32XD	Score: 15–7, 12–15, 17–15	
20 October	Vietnam International (Ninh Bình): Dates: 21 October – 26 October; Host: Ninh Bình, Vietnam; Venue: Ninh Bình Sports Stadium; Level: International Series; Prize: $5,000; Format: 64MS/32WS/32MD/32WD/32XD	(Thailand) Weeraphat Phakjarung (Thailand) Tanupat Viriyangkura	(Vietnam) Nguyễn Đình Hoàng (Vietnam) Trần Đình Mạnh
20 October	Vietnam International (Ninh Bình): Dates: 21 October – 26 October; Host: Ninh Bình, Vietnam; Venue: Ninh Bình Sports Stadium; Level: International Series; Prize: $5,000; Format: 64MS/32WS/32MD/32WD/32XD	Score: 15–11, 16–18, 15–9	
20 October	Vietnam International (Ninh Bình): Dates: 21 October – 26 October; Host: Ninh Bình, Vietnam; Venue: Ninh Bình Sports Stadium; Level: International Series; Prize: $5,000; Format: 64MS/32WS/32MD/32WD/32XD	(Japan) Shinobu Hirata (Japan) Yuzuki Nakashima	(Thailand) Pitchanard Chaiwanna (Thailand) Pattaraporn Rungruengpramong
20 October	Vietnam International (Ninh Bình): Dates: 21 October – 26 October; Host: Ninh Bình, Vietnam; Venue: Ninh Bình Sports Stadium; Level: International Series; Prize: $5,000; Format: 64MS/32WS/32MD/32WD/32XD	Score: 18–16, 15–12	
20 October	Vietnam International (Ninh Bình): Dates: 21 October – 26 October; Host: Ninh Bình, Vietnam; Venue: Ninh Bình Sports Stadium; Level: International Series; Prize: $5,000; Format: 64MS/32WS/32MD/32WD/32XD	(Indonesia) Evano Tangka (Indonesia) Gloria Emanuelle Widjaja	(Thailand) Surasit Ariyabaraneekul (Thailand) Atitaya Povanon
20 October	Vietnam International (Ninh Bình): Dates: 21 October – 26 October; Host: Ninh Bình, Vietnam; Venue: Ninh Bình Sports Stadium; Level: International Series; Prize: $5,000; Format: 64MS/32WS/32MD/32WD/32XD	Score: 16–14, 16–14	
20 October	Venezuela International: Dates: 22 October – 26 October; Host: Maracay, Venezuela; Venue: Gimnasio cubierto Mauricio Johnson; Level: International Series; Prize: $5,000; Format: 16MS/16WS/8MD/4WD/16XD	(Sri Lanka) Dumindu Abeywickrama	(Switzerland) Tobias Künzi
20 October	Venezuela International: Dates: 22 October – 26 October; Host: Maracay, Venezuela; Venue: Gimnasio cubierto Mauricio Johnson; Level: International Series; Prize: $5,000; Format: 16MS/16WS/8MD/4WD/16XD	Score: 10–21, 21–18, 21–12	
20 October	Venezuela International: Dates: 22 October – 26 October; Host: Maracay, Venezuela; Venue: Gimnasio cubierto Mauricio Johnson; Level: International Series; Prize: $5,000; Format: 16MS/16WS/8MD/4WD/16XD	(Peru) Inés Castillo	(Mexico) Sabrina Solís
20 October	Venezuela International: Dates: 22 October – 26 October; Host: Maracay, Venezuela; Venue: Gimnasio cubierto Mauricio Johnson; Level: International Series; Prize: $5,000; Format: 16MS/16WS/8MD/4WD/16XD	Score: 21–10, 21–13	
20 October	Venezuela International: Dates: 22 October – 26 October; Host: Maracay, Venezuela; Venue: Gimnasio cubierto Mauricio Johnson; Level: International Series; Prize: $5,000; Format: 16MS/16WS/8MD/4WD/16XD	(Cuba) Juan Carlos Bencomo Otaño (Cuba) Roberto Carlos Herrera Vazquez	(Venezuela) Frank Barrios (Venezuela) William Barrios
20 October	Venezuela International: Dates: 22 October – 26 October; Host: Maracay, Venezuela; Venue: Gimnasio cubierto Mauricio Johnson; Level: International Series; Prize: $5,000; Format: 16MS/16WS/8MD/4WD/16XD	Score: 21–17, 21–19	
20 October	Venezuela International: Dates: 22 October – 26 October; Host: Maracay, Venezuela; Venue: Gimnasio cubierto Mauricio Johnson; Level: International Series; Prize: $5,000; Format: 16MS/16WS/8MD/4WD/16XD	(Cuba) Leyanis Contreras (Cuba) Taymara Oropesa	(Venezuela) Mariangel Garcia (Venezuela) Maria Rojas Camacho
20 October	Venezuela International: Dates: 22 October – 26 October; Host: Maracay, Venezuela; Venue: Gimnasio cubierto Mauricio Johnson; Level: International Series; Prize: $5,000; Format: 16MS/16WS/8MD/4WD/16XD	Score: 21–14, 21–17	
20 October	Venezuela International: Dates: 22 October – 26 October; Host: Maracay, Venezuela; Venue: Gimnasio cubierto Mauricio Johnson; Level: International Series; Prize: $5,000; Format: 16MS/16WS/8MD/4WD/16XD	(Cuba) Roberto Carlos Herrera Vazquez (Cuba) Taymara Oropesa	(Venezuela) Ricardo Torres (Venezuela) Mariangel Garcia
20 October	Venezuela International: Dates: 22 October – 26 October; Host: Maracay, Venezuela; Venue: Gimnasio cubierto Mauricio Johnson; Level: International Series; Prize: $5,000; Format: 16MS/16WS/8MD/4WD/16XD	Score: 21–10, 21–9	
20 October	Israel Open (cancelled): Dates: 22 October – 25 October; Host: Kibbutz Hatzor, Israel; Venue: Kibbutz Hatzor Sport Hall; Level: Future Series; Format: –		
20 October	Israel Open (cancelled): Dates: 22 October – 25 October; Host: Kibbutz Hatzor, Israel; Venue: Kibbutz Hatzor Sport Hall; Level: Future Series; Format: –	Score:	
20 October	Israel Open (cancelled): Dates: 22 October – 25 October; Host: Kibbutz Hatzor, Israel; Venue: Kibbutz Hatzor Sport Hall; Level: Future Series; Format: –	Score:	
20 October	Israel Open (cancelled): Dates: 22 October – 25 October; Host: Kibbutz Hatzor, Israel; Venue: Kibbutz Hatzor Sport Hall; Level: Future Series; Format: –	Score:	
20 October	Israel Open (cancelled): Dates: 22 October – 25 October; Host: Kibbutz Hatzor, Israel; Venue: Kibbutz Hatzor Sport Hall; Level: Future Series; Format: –	Score:	
20 October	Israel Open (cancelled): Dates: 22 October – 25 October; Host: Kibbutz Hatzor, Israel; Venue: Kibbutz Hatzor Sport Hall; Level: Future Series; Format: –	Score:	
27 October	Hylo Open (Draw): Dates: 28 October – 2 November; Host: Saarbrücken, Germany; Venue: Saarlandhalle; Level: Super 500; Prize: $475,000; Format: 32MS/32WS/32MD/32WD/32XD	(Indonesia) Jonatan Christie	(Denmark) Magnus Johannesen
27 October	Hylo Open (Draw): Dates: 28 October – 2 November; Host: Saarbrücken, Germany; Venue: Saarlandhalle; Level: Super 500; Prize: $475,000; Format: 32MS/32WS/32MD/32WD/32XD	Score: 21–14, 21–14	
27 October	Hylo Open (Draw): Dates: 28 October – 2 November; Host: Saarbrücken, Germany; Venue: Saarlandhalle; Level: Super 500; Prize: $475,000; Format: 32MS/32WS/32MD/32WD/32XD	(Denmark) Mia Blichfeldt	(Indonesia) Putri Kusuma Wardani
27 October	Hylo Open (Draw): Dates: 28 October – 2 November; Host: Saarbrücken, Germany; Venue: Saarlandhalle; Level: Super 500; Prize: $475,000; Format: 32MS/32WS/32MD/32WD/32XD	Score: 21–11, 7–21, 21–12	
27 October	Hylo Open (Draw): Dates: 28 October – 2 November; Host: Saarbrücken, Germany; Venue: Saarlandhalle; Level: Super 500; Prize: $475,000; Format: 32MS/32WS/32MD/32WD/32XD	(Chinese Taipei) Chiu Hsiang-chieh (Chinese Taipei) Wang Chi-lin	(Indonesia) Sabar Karyaman Gutama (Indonesia) Muhammad Reza Pahlevi Isfahani
27 October	Hylo Open (Draw): Dates: 28 October – 2 November; Host: Saarbrücken, Germany; Venue: Saarlandhalle; Level: Super 500; Prize: $475,000; Format: 32MS/32WS/32MD/32WD/32XD	Score: 21–19, 21–18	
27 October	Hylo Open (Draw): Dates: 28 October – 2 November; Host: Saarbrücken, Germany; Venue: Saarlandhalle; Level: Super 500; Prize: $475,000; Format: 32MS/32WS/32MD/32WD/32XD	(France) Margot Lambert (France) Camille Pognante	(Chinese Taipei) Hsu Yin-hui (Chinese Taipei) Lin Jhih-yun
27 October	Hylo Open (Draw): Dates: 28 October – 2 November; Host: Saarbrücken, Germany; Venue: Saarlandhalle; Level: Super 500; Prize: $475,000; Format: 32MS/32WS/32MD/32WD/32XD	Score: 21–16, 21–10	
27 October	Hylo Open (Draw): Dates: 28 October – 2 November; Host: Saarbrücken, Germany; Venue: Saarlandhalle; Level: Super 500; Prize: $475,000; Format: 32MS/32WS/32MD/32WD/32XD	(Denmark) Mathias Christiansen (Denmark) Alexandra Bøje	(France) Thom Gicquel (France) Delphine Delrue
27 October	Hylo Open (Draw): Dates: 28 October – 2 November; Host: Saarbrücken, Germany; Venue: Saarlandhalle; Level: Super 500; Prize: $475,000; Format: 32MS/32WS/32MD/32WD/32XD	Score: 23–21, 21–15	
27 October	India International (Mangalore): Dates: 28 October – 2 November; Host: Mangaluru, India; Venue: Urwa Indoor Stadium; Level: International Challenge; Prize: $25,000; Format: 64MS/64WS/32MD/32WD/32XD	(India) Rithvik Sanjeevi	(India) Rounak Chouhan
27 October	India International (Mangalore): Dates: 28 October – 2 November; Host: Mangaluru, India; Venue: Urwa Indoor Stadium; Level: International Challenge; Prize: $25,000; Format: 64MS/64WS/32MD/32WD/32XD	Score: 14–21, 21–19, 21–19	
27 October	India International (Mangalore): Dates: 28 October – 2 November; Host: Mangaluru, India; Venue: Urwa Indoor Stadium; Level: International Challenge; Prize: $25,000; Format: 64MS/64WS/32MD/32WD/32XD	(India) Mansi Singh	(India) Ashmita Chaliha
27 October	India International (Mangalore): Dates: 28 October – 2 November; Host: Mangaluru, India; Venue: Urwa Indoor Stadium; Level: International Challenge; Prize: $25,000; Format: 64MS/64WS/32MD/32WD/32XD	Score: 21–17, 22–20	
27 October	India International (Mangalore): Dates: 28 October – 2 November; Host: Mangaluru, India; Venue: Urwa Indoor Stadium; Level: International Challenge; Prize: $25,000; Format: 64MS/64WS/32MD/32WD/32XD	(Singapore) Wesley Koh (Singapore) Junsuke Kubo	(Singapore) Donovan Willard Wee (Singapore) Howin Wong
27 October	India International (Mangalore): Dates: 28 October – 2 November; Host: Mangaluru, India; Venue: Urwa Indoor Stadium; Level: International Challenge; Prize: $25,000; Format: 64MS/64WS/32MD/32WD/32XD	Score: 21–12, 21–17	
27 October	India International (Mangalore): Dates: 28 October – 2 November; Host: Mangaluru, India; Venue: Urwa Indoor Stadium; Level: International Challenge; Prize: $25,000; Format: 64MS/64WS/32MD/32WD/32XD	(Thailand) Hathaithip Mijad (Thailand) Napapakorn Tungkasatan	(India) Srinidhi Narayanan (India) Reshika Uthayasooriyan
27 October	India International (Mangalore): Dates: 28 October – 2 November; Host: Mangaluru, India; Venue: Urwa Indoor Stadium; Level: International Challenge; Prize: $25,000; Format: 64MS/64WS/32MD/32WD/32XD	Score: 21–7, 21–11	
27 October	India International (Mangalore): Dates: 28 October – 2 November; Host: Mangaluru, India; Venue: Urwa Indoor Stadium; Level: International Challenge; Prize: $25,000; Format: 64MS/64WS/32MD/32WD/32XD	(India) Dhruv Rawat (India) K. Maneesha	(Thailand) Thanawin Madee (Thailand) Napapakorn Tungkasatan
27 October	India International (Mangalore): Dates: 28 October – 2 November; Host: Mangaluru, India; Venue: Urwa Indoor Stadium; Level: International Challenge; Prize: $25,000; Format: 64MS/64WS/32MD/32WD/32XD	Score: 18–21, 21–18, 22–20	
27 October	Vietnam International (Bắc Giang): Dates: 28 October – 2 November; Host: Bắc Giang, Vietnam; Venue: Bắc Giang Gymnasiums; Level: International Series; Prize: $5,000; Format: 64MS/32WS/32MD/32WD/32XD	(Vietnam) Lê Đức Phát	(Philippines) Jewel Angelo Albo
27 October	Vietnam International (Bắc Giang): Dates: 28 October – 2 November; Host: Bắc Giang, Vietnam; Venue: Bắc Giang Gymnasiums; Level: International Series; Prize: $5,000; Format: 64MS/32WS/32MD/32WD/32XD	Score: 15–21, 21–13, 21–15	
27 October	Vietnam International (Bắc Giang): Dates: 28 October – 2 November; Host: Bắc Giang, Vietnam; Venue: Bắc Giang Gymnasiums; Level: International Series; Prize: $5,000; Format: 64MS/32WS/32MD/32WD/32XD	(Vietnam) Vũ Thị Trang	(Thailand) Tonrug Saeheng
27 October	Vietnam International (Bắc Giang): Dates: 28 October – 2 November; Host: Bắc Giang, Vietnam; Venue: Bắc Giang Gymnasiums; Level: International Series; Prize: $5,000; Format: 64MS/32WS/32MD/32WD/32XD	Score: 21–19, 18–21, 21–11	
27 October	Vietnam International (Bắc Giang): Dates: 28 October – 2 November; Host: Bắc Giang, Vietnam; Venue: Bắc Giang Gymnasiums; Level: International Series; Prize: $5,000; Format: 64MS/32WS/32MD/32WD/32XD	(Indonesia) Faizal Pangestu (Indonesia) Anju Siahaan	(Vietnam) Nguyễn Đình Hoàng (Vietnam) Trần Đình Mạnh
27 October	Vietnam International (Bắc Giang): Dates: 28 October – 2 November; Host: Bắc Giang, Vietnam; Venue: Bắc Giang Gymnasiums; Level: International Series; Prize: $5,000; Format: 64MS/32WS/32MD/32WD/32XD	Score: 21–18, 21–23, 21–14	
27 October	Vietnam International (Bắc Giang): Dates: 28 October – 2 November; Host: Bắc Giang, Vietnam; Venue: Bắc Giang Gymnasiums; Level: International Series; Prize: $5,000; Format: 64MS/32WS/32MD/32WD/32XD	(South Korea) Jeon Jui (South Korea) Kim Ha-na	(Vietnam) Nguyễn Thị Ngọc Lan (Vietnam) Thân Vân Anh
27 October	Vietnam International (Bắc Giang): Dates: 28 October – 2 November; Host: Bắc Giang, Vietnam; Venue: Bắc Giang Gymnasiums; Level: International Series; Prize: $5,000; Format: 64MS/32WS/32MD/32WD/32XD	Score: 21–12, 22–20	
27 October	Vietnam International (Bắc Giang): Dates: 28 October – 2 November; Host: Bắc Giang, Vietnam; Venue: Bắc Giang Gymnasiums; Level: International Series; Prize: $5,000; Format: 64MS/32WS/32MD/32WD/32XD	(Malaysia) Loh Zi Heng (Malaysia) Noraqilah Maisarah	(Thailand) Surasit Ariyabaraneekul (Thailand) Atitaya Povanon
27 October	Vietnam International (Bắc Giang): Dates: 28 October – 2 November; Host: Bắc Giang, Vietnam; Venue: Bắc Giang Gymnasiums; Level: International Series; Prize: $5,000; Format: 64MS/32WS/32MD/32WD/32XD	Score: 21–13, 14–21, 21–16	
27 October	China International (cancelled): Host: TBC, China; Venue: TBC; Level: International Challenge; Prize: –; Format: –		
27 October	China International (cancelled): Host: TBC, China; Venue: TBC; Level: International Challenge; Prize: –; Format: –	Score:	
27 October	China International (cancelled): Host: TBC, China; Venue: TBC; Level: International Challenge; Prize: –; Format: –	Score:	
27 October	China International (cancelled): Host: TBC, China; Venue: TBC; Level: International Challenge; Prize: –; Format: –	Score:	
27 October	China International (cancelled): Host: TBC, China; Venue: TBC; Level: International Challenge; Prize: –; Format: –	Score:	
27 October	China International (cancelled): Host: TBC, China; Venue: TBC; Level: International Challenge; Prize: –; Format: –	Score:	
27 October	Mexican International: Dates: 29 October – 2 November; Host: San Francisco de Campeche, Campeche, Mexico; Venue: Unidad Deportiva 20 de Noviembre; Level: International Series; Prize: $5,000; Format: 32MS/16WS/8MD/4WD/8XD	(United States) Mark Alcala	(Sri Lanka) Dumindu Abeywickrama
27 October	Mexican International: Dates: 29 October – 2 November; Host: San Francisco de Campeche, Campeche, Mexico; Venue: Unidad Deportiva 20 de Noviembre; Level: International Series; Prize: $5,000; Format: 32MS/16WS/8MD/4WD/8XD	Score: 21–13, 21–11	
27 October	Mexican International: Dates: 29 October – 2 November; Host: San Francisco de Campeche, Campeche, Mexico; Venue: Unidad Deportiva 20 de Noviembre; Level: International Series; Prize: $5,000; Format: 32MS/16WS/8MD/4WD/8XD	(United States) Disha Gupta	(Mexico) Vanessa García
27 October	Mexican International: Dates: 29 October – 2 November; Host: San Francisco de Campeche, Campeche, Mexico; Venue: Unidad Deportiva 20 de Noviembre; Level: International Series; Prize: $5,000; Format: 32MS/16WS/8MD/4WD/8XD	Score: 21–16, 15–21, 21–12	
27 October	Mexican International: Dates: 29 October – 2 November; Host: San Francisco de Campeche, Campeche, Mexico; Venue: Unidad Deportiva 20 de Noviembre; Level: International Series; Prize: $5,000; Format: 32MS/16WS/8MD/4WD/8XD	(India) Achutaditya Rao Doddavarapu (India) Arjun Reddy Pochana	(Mexico) Eric Trujillo Enriquez (Mexico) Israel Vazquez Perez
27 October	Mexican International: Dates: 29 October – 2 November; Host: San Francisco de Campeche, Campeche, Mexico; Venue: Unidad Deportiva 20 de Noviembre; Level: International Series; Prize: $5,000; Format: 32MS/16WS/8MD/4WD/8XD	Score: 21–18, 21–17	
27 October	Mexican International: Dates: 29 October – 2 November; Host: San Francisco de Campeche, Campeche, Mexico; Venue: Unidad Deportiva 20 de Noviembre; Level: International Series; Prize: $5,000; Format: 32MS/16WS/8MD/4WD/8XD	(Mexico) Cecilia Madera (Mexico) Isabella Puente	(Mexico) Aline Angel (Mexico) Arely Guzman
27 October	Mexican International: Dates: 29 October – 2 November; Host: San Francisco de Campeche, Campeche, Mexico; Venue: Unidad Deportiva 20 de Noviembre; Level: International Series; Prize: $5,000; Format: 32MS/16WS/8MD/4WD/8XD	Score: 21–15, 21–11	
27 October	Mexican International: Dates: 29 October – 2 November; Host: San Francisco de Campeche, Campeche, Mexico; Venue: Unidad Deportiva 20 de Noviembre; Level: International Series; Prize: $5,000; Format: 32MS/16WS/8MD/4WD/8XD	(Mexico) Luis Montoya (Mexico) Miriam Rodríguez	(Mexico) Irving Pérez (Mexico) Cecilia Madera
27 October	Mexican International: Dates: 29 October – 2 November; Host: San Francisco de Campeche, Campeche, Mexico; Venue: Unidad Deportiva 20 de Noviembre; Level: International Series; Prize: $5,000; Format: 32MS/16WS/8MD/4WD/8XD	Score: 21–13, 21–10	
27 October	Hungarian International: Dates: 29 October – 1 November; Host: Budapest, Hungary; Venue: Sterbinszky Hall; Level: International Series; Prize: $5,000; Format: 32MS/32WS/32MD/32WD/32XD	(Denmark) Jakob Houe	(Austria) Kai Niederhuber
27 October	Hungarian International: Dates: 29 October – 1 November; Host: Budapest, Hungary; Venue: Sterbinszky Hall; Level: International Series; Prize: $5,000; Format: 32MS/32WS/32MD/32WD/32XD	Score: 21–11, 21–8	
27 October	Hungarian International: Dates: 29 October – 1 November; Host: Budapest, Hungary; Venue: Sterbinszky Hall; Level: International Series; Prize: $5,000; Format: 32MS/32WS/32MD/32WD/32XD	(Denmark) Laura Fløj Thomsen	(Hungary) Ágnes Kőrösi
27 October	Hungarian International: Dates: 29 October – 1 November; Host: Budapest, Hungary; Venue: Sterbinszky Hall; Level: International Series; Prize: $5,000; Format: 32MS/32WS/32MD/32WD/32XD	Score: 22–20, 17–21, 21–10	
27 October	Hungarian International: Dates: 29 October – 1 November; Host: Budapest, Hungary; Venue: Sterbinszky Hall; Level: International Series; Prize: $5,000; Format: 32MS/32WS/32MD/32WD/32XD	(Chinese Taipei) Chen Hung-ming (Chinese Taipei) Tsai Cheng-han	(Serbia) Viktor Petrovic (Serbia) Mihajlo Tomic
27 October	Hungarian International: Dates: 29 October – 1 November; Host: Budapest, Hungary; Venue: Sterbinszky Hall; Level: International Series; Prize: $5,000; Format: 32MS/32WS/32MD/32WD/32XD	Score: 21–13, 21–15	
27 October	Hungarian International: Dates: 29 October – 1 November; Host: Budapest, Hungary; Venue: Sterbinszky Hall; Level: International Series; Prize: $5,000; Format: 32MS/32WS/32MD/32WD/32XD	(Denmark) Lærke Hvid (Denmark) Anna Klausholm	(Sweden) Fiona Hallberg (Sweden) Elin Öhling
27 October	Hungarian International: Dates: 29 October – 1 November; Host: Budapest, Hungary; Venue: Sterbinszky Hall; Level: International Series; Prize: $5,000; Format: 32MS/32WS/32MD/32WD/32XD	Score: 21–12, 21–7	
27 October	Hungarian International: Dates: 29 October – 1 November; Host: Budapest, Hungary; Venue: Sterbinszky Hall; Level: International Series; Prize: $5,000; Format: 32MS/32WS/32MD/32WD/32XD	(Denmark) Mads Andersson (Denmark) Anna Klausholm	(Denmark) Mikkel Klinggaard (Denmark) Nicoline Tang
27 October	Hungarian International: Dates: 29 October – 1 November; Host: Budapest, Hungary; Venue: Sterbinszky Hall; Level: International Series; Prize: $5,000; Format: 32MS/32WS/32MD/32WD/32XD	Score: 21–17, 21–16	

=== November ===
Week commencing	Tournament	Champions	Runners-up
3 November	Korea Masters (Draw): Dates: 4 November – 9 November; Host: Iksan, South Korea; Venue: Wonkwang University Cultural and Sports Center; Level: Super 300; Prize: $240,000; Format: 32MS/32WS/32MD/32WD/32XD	(Singapore) Jason Teh	(Japan) Yudai Okimoto
3 November	Korea Masters (Draw): Dates: 4 November – 9 November; Host: Iksan, South Korea; Venue: Wonkwang University Cultural and Sports Center; Level: Super 300; Prize: $240,000; Format: 32MS/32WS/32MD/32WD/32XD	Score: 21–14, 21–15	
3 November	Korea Masters (Draw): Dates: 4 November – 9 November; Host: Iksan, South Korea; Venue: Wonkwang University Cultural and Sports Center; Level: Super 300; Prize: $240,000; Format: 32MS/32WS/32MD/32WD/32XD	(Chinese Taipei) Chiu Pin-chian	(Vietnam) Nguyễn Thùy Linh
3 November	Korea Masters (Draw): Dates: 4 November – 9 November; Host: Iksan, South Korea; Venue: Wonkwang University Cultural and Sports Center; Level: Super 300; Prize: $240,000; Format: 32MS/32WS/32MD/32WD/32XD	Score: 21–16, 21–15	
3 November	Korea Masters (Draw): Dates: 4 November – 9 November; Host: Iksan, South Korea; Venue: Wonkwang University Cultural and Sports Center; Level: Super 300; Prize: $240,000; Format: 32MS/32WS/32MD/32WD/32XD	(South Korea) Lee Jong-min (South Korea) Wang Chan	(Indonesia) Raymond Indra (Indonesia) Nikolaus Joaquin
3 November	Korea Masters (Draw): Dates: 4 November – 9 November; Host: Iksan, South Korea; Venue: Wonkwang University Cultural and Sports Center; Level: Super 300; Prize: $240,000; Format: 32MS/32WS/32MD/32WD/32XD	Score: 16–21, 21–16, 21–6	
3 November	Korea Masters (Draw): Dates: 4 November – 9 November; Host: Iksan, South Korea; Venue: Wonkwang University Cultural and Sports Center; Level: Super 300; Prize: $240,000; Format: 32MS/32WS/32MD/32WD/32XD	(Japan) Hinata Suzuki (Japan) Nao Yamakita	(South Korea) Kim So-yeong (South Korea) Lee Seo-jin
3 November	Korea Masters (Draw): Dates: 4 November – 9 November; Host: Iksan, South Korea; Venue: Wonkwang University Cultural and Sports Center; Level: Super 300; Prize: $240,000; Format: 32MS/32WS/32MD/32WD/32XD	Score: 21–18, 25–23	
3 November	Korea Masters (Draw): Dates: 4 November – 9 November; Host: Iksan, South Korea; Venue: Wonkwang University Cultural and Sports Center; Level: Super 300; Prize: $240,000; Format: 32MS/32WS/32MD/32WD/32XD	(South Korea) Kim Jae-hyeon (South Korea) Jeong Na-eun	(Malaysia) Jimmy Wong (Malaysia) Lai Pei Jing
3 November	Korea Masters (Draw): Dates: 4 November – 9 November; Host: Iksan, South Korea; Venue: Wonkwang University Cultural and Sports Center; Level: Super 300; Prize: $240,000; Format: 32MS/32WS/32MD/32WD/32XD	Score: 24–22, 21–18	
3 November	India International (Telangana): Dates: 4 November – 9 November; Host: Hyderabad, India; Venue: GMC Balayogi Sports Complex; Level: International Challenge; Prize: $25,000; Format: 64MS/64WS/32MD/32WD/32XD	(India) Ginpaul Sonna	(India) Mithun Manjunath
3 November	India International (Telangana): Dates: 4 November – 9 November; Host: Hyderabad, India; Venue: GMC Balayogi Sports Complex; Level: International Challenge; Prize: $25,000; Format: 64MS/64WS/32MD/32WD/32XD	Score: 21–9, 21–11	
3 November	India International (Telangana): Dates: 4 November – 9 November; Host: Hyderabad, India; Venue: GMC Balayogi Sports Complex; Level: International Challenge; Prize: $25,000; Format: 64MS/64WS/32MD/32WD/32XD	(India) Mansi Singh	(India) Rakshitha Ramraj
3 November	India International (Telangana): Dates: 4 November – 9 November; Host: Hyderabad, India; Venue: GMC Balayogi Sports Complex; Level: International Challenge; Prize: $25,000; Format: 64MS/64WS/32MD/32WD/32XD	Score: 21–9, 21–14	
3 November	India International (Telangana): Dates: 4 November – 9 November; Host: Hyderabad, India; Venue: GMC Balayogi Sports Complex; Level: International Challenge; Prize: $25,000; Format: 64MS/64WS/32MD/32WD/32XD	(India) Hariharan Amsakarunan (India) Arjun M. R.	(Thailand) Pharanyu Kaosamaang (Thailand) Tanadon Punpanich
3 November	India International (Telangana): Dates: 4 November – 9 November; Host: Hyderabad, India; Venue: GMC Balayogi Sports Complex; Level: International Challenge; Prize: $25,000; Format: 64MS/64WS/32MD/32WD/32XD	Score: 21–14, 21–14	
3 November	India International (Telangana): Dates: 4 November – 9 November; Host: Hyderabad, India; Venue: GMC Balayogi Sports Complex; Level: International Challenge; Prize: $25,000; Format: 64MS/64WS/32MD/32WD/32XD	(Thailand) Hathaithip Mijad (Thailand) Napapakorn Tungkasatan	(India) Priya Konjengbam (India) Shruti Mishra
3 November	India International (Telangana): Dates: 4 November – 9 November; Host: Hyderabad, India; Venue: GMC Balayogi Sports Complex; Level: International Challenge; Prize: $25,000; Format: 64MS/64WS/32MD/32WD/32XD	Score: 21–16, 21–16	
3 November	India International (Telangana): Dates: 4 November – 9 November; Host: Hyderabad, India; Venue: GMC Balayogi Sports Complex; Level: International Challenge; Prize: $25,000; Format: 64MS/64WS/32MD/32WD/32XD	(India) Sathwik Reddy Kanapuram (India) Reshika Uthayasooriyan	(India) Ishaan Bhatnagar (India) Aradhana Balachandra
3 November	India International (Telangana): Dates: 4 November – 9 November; Host: Hyderabad, India; Venue: GMC Balayogi Sports Complex; Level: International Challenge; Prize: $25,000; Format: 64MS/64WS/32MD/32WD/32XD	Score: 22–20, 21–8	
3 November	Norwegian International: Dates: 6 November – 9 November; Host: Sandefjord, Norway; Venue: Jotunhallen; Level: International Series; Prize: $5,000; Format: 32MS/32WS/24MD/24WD/24XD	(Chinese Taipei) Chiang Tzu-chieh	(Chinese Taipei) Chen Chi-ting
3 November	Norwegian International: Dates: 6 November – 9 November; Host: Sandefjord, Norway; Venue: Jotunhallen; Level: International Series; Prize: $5,000; Format: 32MS/32WS/24MD/24WD/24XD	Score: 21–18, 21–17	
3 November	Norwegian International: Dates: 6 November – 9 November; Host: Sandefjord, Norway; Venue: Jotunhallen; Level: International Series; Prize: $5,000; Format: 32MS/32WS/24MD/24WD/24XD	(Chinese Taipei) Liao Jui-chi	(Chinese Taipei) Liao Yuan-chi
3 November	Norwegian International: Dates: 6 November – 9 November; Host: Sandefjord, Norway; Venue: Jotunhallen; Level: International Series; Prize: $5,000; Format: 32MS/32WS/24MD/24WD/24XD	Score: 21–11, 19–21, 21–10	
3 November	Norwegian International: Dates: 6 November – 9 November; Host: Sandefjord, Norway; Venue: Jotunhallen; Level: International Series; Prize: $5,000; Format: 32MS/32WS/24MD/24WD/24XD	(Chinese Taipei) Chen Hung-ming (Chinese Taipei) Tsai Cheng-han	(Norway) Torjus Flaatten (Norway) Jonas Østhassel
3 November	Norwegian International: Dates: 6 November – 9 November; Host: Sandefjord, Norway; Venue: Jotunhallen; Level: International Series; Prize: $5,000; Format: 32MS/32WS/24MD/24WD/24XD	Score: 22–24, 21–15, 21–14	
3 November	Norwegian International: Dates: 6 November – 9 November; Host: Sandefjord, Norway; Venue: Jotunhallen; Level: International Series; Prize: $5,000; Format: 32MS/32WS/24MD/24WD/24XD	(Sweden) Malena Norrman (Sweden) Tilda Sjöö	(Chinese Taipei) Chang Yun-jung (Chinese Taipei) Liao Jui-chi
3 November	Norwegian International: Dates: 6 November – 9 November; Host: Sandefjord, Norway; Venue: Jotunhallen; Level: International Series; Prize: $5,000; Format: 32MS/32WS/24MD/24WD/24XD	Score: 21–15, 21–9	
3 November	Norwegian International: Dates: 6 November – 9 November; Host: Sandefjord, Norway; Venue: Jotunhallen; Level: International Series; Prize: $5,000; Format: 32MS/32WS/24MD/24WD/24XD	(Sweden) Filip Karlborg (Sweden) Tilda Sjöö	(Sweden) Max Svensson (Sweden) Sofia Strömvall
3 November	Norwegian International: Dates: 6 November – 9 November; Host: Sandefjord, Norway; Venue: Jotunhallen; Level: International Series; Prize: $5,000; Format: 32MS/32WS/24MD/24WD/24XD	Score: 21–12, 21–11	
3 November	Trinidad and Tobago International: Dates: 4 November – 9 November; Host: Tacarigua, Trinidad and Tobago; Venue: National Racket Center; Level: Future Series; Format: 32MS/32WS/32MD/16WD/32XD	(Switzerland) Julien Scheiwiller	(Switzerland) Nicolas A. Mueller
3 November	Trinidad and Tobago International: Dates: 4 November – 9 November; Host: Tacarigua, Trinidad and Tobago; Venue: National Racket Center; Level: Future Series; Format: 32MS/32WS/32MD/16WD/32XD	Score: 21–19, 21–18	
3 November	Trinidad and Tobago International: Dates: 4 November – 9 November; Host: Tacarigua, Trinidad and Tobago; Venue: National Racket Center; Level: Future Series; Format: 32MS/32WS/32MD/16WD/32XD	(Italy) Gianna Stiglich	(Argentina) Iona Gualdi
3 November	Trinidad and Tobago International: Dates: 4 November – 9 November; Host: Tacarigua, Trinidad and Tobago; Venue: National Racket Center; Level: Future Series; Format: 32MS/32WS/32MD/16WD/32XD	Score: 21–8, 21–8	
3 November	Trinidad and Tobago International: Dates: 4 November – 9 November; Host: Tacarigua, Trinidad and Tobago; Venue: National Racket Center; Level: Future Series; Format: 32MS/32WS/32MD/16WD/32XD	(Slovakia) Andrej Suchý (Slovakia) Simeon Suchý	(India) Achutaditya Rao Doddavarapu (India) Arjun Reddy Pochana
3 November	Trinidad and Tobago International: Dates: 4 November – 9 November; Host: Tacarigua, Trinidad and Tobago; Venue: National Racket Center; Level: Future Series; Format: 32MS/32WS/32MD/16WD/32XD	Score: 21–13, 21–12	
3 November	Trinidad and Tobago International: Dates: 4 November – 9 November; Host: Tacarigua, Trinidad and Tobago; Venue: National Racket Center; Level: Future Series; Format: 32MS/32WS/32MD/16WD/32XD	(Jamaica) Breanna Bisnott (Jamaica) Tahlia Richardson	(Trinidad and Tobago) Nekeisha Blake (Barbados) Sabrina Scott
3 November	Trinidad and Tobago International: Dates: 4 November – 9 November; Host: Tacarigua, Trinidad and Tobago; Venue: National Racket Center; Level: Future Series; Format: 32MS/32WS/32MD/16WD/32XD	Score: 21–13, 21–17	
3 November	Trinidad and Tobago International: Dates: 4 November – 9 November; Host: Tacarigua, Trinidad and Tobago; Venue: National Racket Center; Level: Future Series; Format: 32MS/32WS/32MD/16WD/32XD	(Trinidad and Tobago) Parth Mehta (Trinidad and Tobago) Chequeda de Boulet	(Barbados) Shae Michael Martin (Barbados) Sabrina Scott
3 November	Trinidad and Tobago International: Dates: 4 November – 9 November; Host: Tacarigua, Trinidad and Tobago; Venue: National Racket Center; Level: Future Series; Format: 32MS/32WS/32MD/16WD/32XD	Score: 21–19, 21–19	
10 November	Japan Masters (Draw): Dates: 11 November – 16 November; Host: Kumamoto, Japan; Venue: Kumamoto Prefectural Gymnasium; Level: Super 500; Prize: $475,000; Format: 32MS/32WS/32MD/32WD/32XD	(Japan) Kodai Naraoka	(Japan) Kenta Nishimoto
10 November	Japan Masters (Draw): Dates: 11 November – 16 November; Host: Kumamoto, Japan; Venue: Kumamoto Prefectural Gymnasium; Level: Super 500; Prize: $475,000; Format: 32MS/32WS/32MD/32WD/32XD	Score: 21–11, 10–21, 21–15	
10 November	Japan Masters (Draw): Dates: 11 November – 16 November; Host: Kumamoto, Japan; Venue: Kumamoto Prefectural Gymnasium; Level: Super 500; Prize: $475,000; Format: 32MS/32WS/32MD/32WD/32XD	(Thailand) Ratchanok Intanon	(Indonesia) Gregoria Mariska Tunjung
10 November	Japan Masters (Draw): Dates: 11 November – 16 November; Host: Kumamoto, Japan; Venue: Kumamoto Prefectural Gymnasium; Level: Super 500; Prize: $475,000; Format: 32MS/32WS/32MD/32WD/32XD	Score: 21–16, 22–20	
10 November	Japan Masters (Draw): Dates: 11 November – 16 November; Host: Kumamoto, Japan; Venue: Kumamoto Prefectural Gymnasium; Level: Super 500; Prize: $475,000; Format: 32MS/32WS/32MD/32WD/32XD	(South Korea) Kim Won-ho (South Korea) Seo Seung-jae	(Japan) Hiroki Midorikawa (Japan) Kyohei Yamashita
10 November	Japan Masters (Draw): Dates: 11 November – 16 November; Host: Kumamoto, Japan; Venue: Kumamoto Prefectural Gymnasium; Level: Super 500; Prize: $475,000; Format: 32MS/32WS/32MD/32WD/32XD	Score: 20–22, 21–11, 21–16	
10 November	Japan Masters (Draw): Dates: 11 November – 16 November; Host: Kumamoto, Japan; Venue: Kumamoto Prefectural Gymnasium; Level: Super 500; Prize: $475,000; Format: 32MS/32WS/32MD/32WD/32XD	(Malaysia) Pearly Tan (Malaysia) Thinaah Muralitharan	(Japan) Rin Iwanaga (Japan) Kie Nakanishi
10 November	Japan Masters (Draw): Dates: 11 November – 16 November; Host: Kumamoto, Japan; Venue: Kumamoto Prefectural Gymnasium; Level: Super 500; Prize: $475,000; Format: 32MS/32WS/32MD/32WD/32XD	Score: 22–20, 21–19	
10 November	Japan Masters (Draw): Dates: 11 November – 16 November; Host: Kumamoto, Japan; Venue: Kumamoto Prefectural Gymnasium; Level: Super 500; Prize: $475,000; Format: 32MS/32WS/32MD/32WD/32XD	(Thailand) Dechapol Puavaranukroh (Thailand) Supissara Paewsampran	(France) Thom Gicquel (France) Delphine Delrue
10 November	Japan Masters (Draw): Dates: 11 November – 16 November; Host: Kumamoto, Japan; Venue: Kumamoto Prefectural Gymnasium; Level: Super 500; Prize: $475,000; Format: 32MS/32WS/32MD/32WD/32XD	Score: 21–18, 14–21, 21–18	
10 November	Indonesia International I: Dates: 11 November – 16 November; Host: Yogyakarta, Yogyakarta, Indonesia; Venue: Among Rogo Sports Hall; Level: International Challenge; Prize: $20,000; Format: 64MS/32WS/32MD/32WD/32XD	(Indonesia) Prahdiska Bagas Shujiwo	(Indonesia) Bismo Raya Oktora
10 November	Indonesia International I: Dates: 11 November – 16 November; Host: Yogyakarta, Yogyakarta, Indonesia; Venue: Among Rogo Sports Hall; Level: International Challenge; Prize: $20,000; Format: 64MS/32WS/32MD/32WD/32XD	Score: 21–17, 21–17	
10 November	Indonesia International I: Dates: 11 November – 16 November; Host: Yogyakarta, Yogyakarta, Indonesia; Venue: Among Rogo Sports Hall; Level: International Challenge; Prize: $20,000; Format: 64MS/32WS/32MD/32WD/32XD	(Indonesia) Thalita Ramadhani Wiryawan	(Indonesia) Mutiara Ayu Puspitasari
10 November	Indonesia International I: Dates: 11 November – 16 November; Host: Yogyakarta, Yogyakarta, Indonesia; Venue: Among Rogo Sports Hall; Level: International Challenge; Prize: $20,000; Format: 64MS/32WS/32MD/32WD/32XD	Score: 17–21, 21–14, 21–13	
10 November	Indonesia International I: Dates: 11 November – 16 November; Host: Yogyakarta, Yogyakarta, Indonesia; Venue: Among Rogo Sports Hall; Level: International Challenge; Prize: $20,000; Format: 64MS/32WS/32MD/32WD/32XD	(Indonesia) Putra Erwiansyah (Indonesia) Daniel Edgar Marvino	(South Korea) Cho Song-hyun (South Korea) Jin Sung-ik
10 November	Indonesia International I: Dates: 11 November – 16 November; Host: Yogyakarta, Yogyakarta, Indonesia; Venue: Among Rogo Sports Hall; Level: International Challenge; Prize: $20,000; Format: 64MS/32WS/32MD/32WD/32XD	Score: 20–22, 21–19 retired	
10 November	Indonesia International I: Dates: 11 November – 16 November; Host: Yogyakarta, Yogyakarta, Indonesia; Venue: Among Rogo Sports Hall; Level: International Challenge; Prize: $20,000; Format: 64MS/32WS/32MD/32WD/32XD	(Chinese Taipei) Lin Chih-chun (Chinese Taipei) Lin Wan-ching	(Indonesia) Selsi Josika (Indonesia) Yasintha Ristyna Putri
10 November	Indonesia International I: Dates: 11 November – 16 November; Host: Yogyakarta, Yogyakarta, Indonesia; Venue: Among Rogo Sports Hall; Level: International Challenge; Prize: $20,000; Format: 64MS/32WS/32MD/32WD/32XD	Score: 21–14, 21–12	
10 November	Indonesia International I: Dates: 11 November – 16 November; Host: Yogyakarta, Yogyakarta, Indonesia; Venue: Among Rogo Sports Hall; Level: International Challenge; Prize: $20,000; Format: 64MS/32WS/32MD/32WD/32XD	(Indonesia) Bobby Setiabudi (Indonesia) Melati Daeva Oktavianti	(Indonesia) Renaldi Samosir (Indonesia) Masita Mahmudin
10 November	Indonesia International I: Dates: 11 November – 16 November; Host: Yogyakarta, Yogyakarta, Indonesia; Venue: Among Rogo Sports Hall; Level: International Challenge; Prize: $20,000; Format: 64MS/32WS/32MD/32WD/32XD	Score: 17–21, 21–11, 21–16	
10 November	Irish Open: Dates: 12 November – 15 November; Host: Dublin, Republic of Ireland; Venue: National Indoor Arena; Level: International Challenge; Prize: $17,500; Format: 32MS/32WS/32MD/32WD/32XD	(France) Arnaud Merklé	(Israel) Daniil Dubovenko
10 November	Irish Open: Dates: 12 November – 15 November; Host: Dublin, Republic of Ireland; Venue: National Indoor Arena; Level: International Challenge; Prize: $17,500; Format: 32MS/32WS/32MD/32WD/32XD	Score: 21–14, 26–24	
10 November	Irish Open: Dates: 12 November – 15 November; Host: Dublin, Republic of Ireland; Venue: National Indoor Arena; Level: International Challenge; Prize: $17,500; Format: 32MS/32WS/32MD/32WD/32XD	(South Korea) Kim Ga-ram	(Germany) Yvonne Li
10 November	Irish Open: Dates: 12 November – 15 November; Host: Dublin, Republic of Ireland; Venue: National Indoor Arena; Level: International Challenge; Prize: $17,500; Format: 32MS/32WS/32MD/32WD/32XD	Score: 21–15, 18–21, 21–9	
10 November	Irish Open: Dates: 12 November – 15 November; Host: Dublin, Republic of Ireland; Venue: National Indoor Arena; Level: International Challenge; Prize: $17,500; Format: 32MS/32WS/32MD/32WD/32XD	(England) Alex Green (England) Zach Russ	(England) Oliver Butler (England) Samuel Jones
10 November	Irish Open: Dates: 12 November – 15 November; Host: Dublin, Republic of Ireland; Venue: National Indoor Arena; Level: International Challenge; Prize: $17,500; Format: 32MS/32WS/32MD/32WD/32XD	Score: 21–19, 21–13	
10 November	Irish Open: Dates: 12 November – 15 November; Host: Dublin, Republic of Ireland; Venue: National Indoor Arena; Level: International Challenge; Prize: $17,500; Format: 32MS/32WS/32MD/32WD/32XD	(South Korea) Kim Min-ji (South Korea) Lee Ye-na	(Spain) Paula López (Spain) Lucía Rodríguez
10 November	Irish Open: Dates: 12 November – 15 November; Host: Dublin, Republic of Ireland; Venue: National Indoor Arena; Level: International Challenge; Prize: $17,500; Format: 32MS/32WS/32MD/32WD/32XD	Score: 21–19, 21–16	
10 November	Irish Open: Dates: 12 November – 15 November; Host: Dublin, Republic of Ireland; Venue: National Indoor Arena; Level: International Challenge; Prize: $17,500; Format: 32MS/32WS/32MD/32WD/32XD	(Denmark) Rasmus Espersen (Denmark) Amalie Cecilie Kudsk	(Denmark) Kristoffer Kolding (Denmark) Mette Werge
10 November	Irish Open: Dates: 12 November – 15 November; Host: Dublin, Republic of Ireland; Venue: National Indoor Arena; Level: International Challenge; Prize: $17,500; Format: 32MS/32WS/32MD/32WD/32XD	Score: 21–19, 21–18	
10 November	Suriname International: Dates: 12 November – 16 November; Host: Paramaribo, Suriname; Venue: Ring Sport Center; Level: International Series; Prize: $5,000; Format: 32MS/32WS/32MD/16WD/32XD	(El Salvador) Uriel Canjura	(Switzerland) Julien Scheiwiller
10 November	Suriname International: Dates: 12 November – 16 November; Host: Paramaribo, Suriname; Venue: Ring Sport Center; Level: International Series; Prize: $5,000; Format: 32MS/32WS/32MD/16WD/32XD	Score: 18–21, 21–8, 21–9	
10 November	Suriname International: Dates: 12 November – 16 November; Host: Paramaribo, Suriname; Venue: Ring Sport Center; Level: International Series; Prize: $5,000; Format: 32MS/32WS/32MD/16WD/32XD	(Switzerland) Dounia Pelupessy	(Czech Republic) Sharleen van Coppenolle
10 November	Suriname International: Dates: 12 November – 16 November; Host: Paramaribo, Suriname; Venue: Ring Sport Center; Level: International Series; Prize: $5,000; Format: 32MS/32WS/32MD/16WD/32XD	Score: 17–21, 21–11, 21–15	
10 November	Suriname International: Dates: 12 November – 16 November; Host: Paramaribo, Suriname; Venue: Ring Sport Center; Level: International Series; Prize: $5,000; Format: 32MS/32WS/32MD/16WD/32XD	(Peru) Adriano Viale (Israel) Misha Zilberman	(Slovakia) Andrej Suchý (Slovakia) Simeon Suchý
10 November	Suriname International: Dates: 12 November – 16 November; Host: Paramaribo, Suriname; Venue: Ring Sport Center; Level: International Series; Prize: $5,000; Format: 32MS/32WS/32MD/16WD/32XD	Score: 22–20, 21–18	
10 November	Suriname International: Dates: 12 November – 16 November; Host: Paramaribo, Suriname; Venue: Ring Sport Center; Level: International Series; Prize: $5,000; Format: 32MS/32WS/32MD/16WD/32XD	(Italy) Martina Corsini (Italy) Emma Piccinin	(Lithuania) Viltė Paulauskaitė (Czech Republic) Sharleen van Coppenolle
10 November	Suriname International: Dates: 12 November – 16 November; Host: Paramaribo, Suriname; Venue: Ring Sport Center; Level: International Series; Prize: $5,000; Format: 32MS/32WS/32MD/16WD/32XD	Score: 21–16, 21–9	
10 November	Suriname International: Dates: 12 November – 16 November; Host: Paramaribo, Suriname; Venue: Ring Sport Center; Level: International Series; Prize: $5,000; Format: 32MS/32WS/32MD/16WD/32XD	(Trinidad and Tobago) Parth Mehta (Trinidad and Tobago) Chequeda de Boulet	(Suriname) Al-Hassan Somedjo (Suriname) Faith Sariman
10 November	Suriname International: Dates: 12 November – 16 November; Host: Paramaribo, Suriname; Venue: Ring Sport Center; Level: International Series; Prize: $5,000; Format: 32MS/32WS/32MD/16WD/32XD	Score: 21–11, 21–6	
10 November	Zambia International: Dates: 13 November – 16 November; Host: Lusaka, Zambia; Venue: OYDC – Sports Development Centre; Level: International Series; Prize: $5,000; Format: 32MS/32WS/32MD/8WD/32XD	(United Arab Emirates) Shashaank Sai Munnangi	(India) Hemanth M. Gowda
10 November	Zambia International: Dates: 13 November – 16 November; Host: Lusaka, Zambia; Venue: OYDC – Sports Development Centre; Level: International Series; Prize: $5,000; Format: 32MS/32WS/32MD/8WD/32XD	Score: 11–21, 21–13, 21–12	
10 November	Zambia International: Dates: 13 November – 16 November; Host: Lusaka, Zambia; Venue: OYDC – Sports Development Centre; Level: International Series; Prize: $5,000; Format: 32MS/32WS/32MD/8WD/32XD	(Italy) Yasmine Hamza	(Switzerland) Jenjira Stadelmann
10 November	Zambia International: Dates: 13 November – 16 November; Host: Lusaka, Zambia; Venue: OYDC – Sports Development Centre; Level: International Series; Prize: $5,000; Format: 32MS/32WS/32MD/8WD/32XD	Score: 7–7 retired	
10 November	Zambia International: Dates: 13 November – 16 November; Host: Lusaka, Zambia; Venue: OYDC – Sports Development Centre; Level: International Series; Prize: $5,000; Format: 32MS/32WS/32MD/8WD/32XD	(India) Anuj Kale (India) Ian Lopes	(India) Achutaditya Rao Doddavarapu (India) Arjun Reddy Pochana
10 November	Zambia International: Dates: 13 November – 16 November; Host: Lusaka, Zambia; Venue: OYDC – Sports Development Centre; Level: International Series; Prize: $5,000; Format: 32MS/32WS/32MD/8WD/32XD	Score: 21–9, 21–13	
10 November	Zambia International: Dates: 13 November – 16 November; Host: Lusaka, Zambia; Venue: OYDC – Sports Development Centre; Level: International Series; Prize: $5,000; Format: 32MS/32WS/32MD/8WD/32XD	(South Africa) Amy Ackerman (South Africa) Johanita Scholtz	(Maldives) Aminath Nabeeha Abdul Razzaq (Maldives) Fathimath Nabaaha Abdul Razzaq
10 November	Zambia International: Dates: 13 November – 16 November; Host: Lusaka, Zambia; Venue: OYDC – Sports Development Centre; Level: International Series; Prize: $5,000; Format: 32MS/32WS/32MD/8WD/32XD	Score: 21–16, 21–14	
10 November	Zambia International: Dates: 13 November – 16 November; Host: Lusaka, Zambia; Venue: OYDC – Sports Development Centre; Level: International Series; Prize: $5,000; Format: 32MS/32WS/32MD/8WD/32XD	(Maldives) Hussein Shaheed (Maldives) Fathimath Nabaaha Abdul Razzaq	(Egypt) Ezzat Kareem (Egypt) Nour Ahmed Youssri
10 November	Zambia International: Dates: 13 November – 16 November; Host: Lusaka, Zambia; Venue: OYDC – Sports Development Centre; Level: International Series; Prize: $5,000; Format: 32MS/32WS/32MD/8WD/32XD	Score: 21–18, 22–20	
17 November	Australian Open (Draw): Dates: 18 November – 23 November; Host: Sydney, Australia; Venue: State Sports Centre; Level: Super 500; Prize: $475,000; Format: 32MS/32WS/32MD/32WD/32XD	(India) Lakshya Sen	(Japan) Yushi Tanaka
17 November	Australian Open (Draw): Dates: 18 November – 23 November; Host: Sydney, Australia; Venue: State Sports Centre; Level: Super 500; Prize: $475,000; Format: 32MS/32WS/32MD/32WD/32XD	Score: 21–15, 21–11	
17 November	Australian Open (Draw): Dates: 18 November – 23 November; Host: Sydney, Australia; Venue: State Sports Centre; Level: Super 500; Prize: $475,000; Format: 32MS/32WS/32MD/32WD/32XD	(South Korea) An Se-young	(Indonesia) Putri Kusuma Wardani
17 November	Australian Open (Draw): Dates: 18 November – 23 November; Host: Sydney, Australia; Venue: State Sports Centre; Level: Super 500; Prize: $475,000; Format: 32MS/32WS/32MD/32WD/32XD	Score: 21–16, 21–14	
17 November	Australian Open (Draw): Dates: 18 November – 23 November; Host: Sydney, Australia; Venue: State Sports Centre; Level: Super 500; Prize: $475,000; Format: 32MS/32WS/32MD/32WD/32XD	(Indonesia) Raymond Indra (Indonesia) Nikolaus Joaquin	(Indonesia) Fajar Alfian (Indonesia) Muhammad Shohibul Fikri
17 November	Australian Open (Draw): Dates: 18 November – 23 November; Host: Sydney, Australia; Venue: State Sports Centre; Level: Super 500; Prize: $475,000; Format: 32MS/32WS/32MD/32WD/32XD	Score: 22–20, 10–21, 21–18	
17 November	Australian Open (Draw): Dates: 18 November – 23 November; Host: Sydney, Australia; Venue: State Sports Centre; Level: Super 500; Prize: $475,000; Format: 32MS/32WS/32MD/32WD/32XD	(Indonesia) Rachel Allessya Rose (Indonesia) Febi Setianingrum	(Indonesia) Febriana Dwipuji Kusuma (Indonesia) Meilysa Trias Puspita Sari
17 November	Australian Open (Draw): Dates: 18 November – 23 November; Host: Sydney, Australia; Venue: State Sports Centre; Level: Super 500; Prize: $475,000; Format: 32MS/32WS/32MD/32WD/32XD	Score: 18–21, 21–19, 23–21	
17 November	Australian Open (Draw): Dates: 18 November – 23 November; Host: Sydney, Australia; Venue: State Sports Centre; Level: Super 500; Prize: $475,000; Format: 32MS/32WS/32MD/32WD/32XD	(Malaysia) Chen Tang Jie (Malaysia) Toh Ee Wei	(Indonesia) Jafar Hidayatullah (Indonesia) Felisha Pasaribu
17 November	Australian Open (Draw): Dates: 18 November – 23 November; Host: Sydney, Australia; Venue: State Sports Centre; Level: Super 500; Prize: $475,000; Format: 32MS/32WS/32MD/32WD/32XD	Score: 21–16, 21–11	
17 November	Indonesia International II: Dates: 18 November – 23 November; Host: Yogyakarta, Yogyakarta, Indonesia; Venue: Among Rogo Sports Hall; Level: International Challenge; Prize: $20,000; Format: 64MS/32WS/32MD/32WD/32XD	(Chinese Taipei) Liao Jhuo-fu	(Chinese Taipei) Wang Yu-kai
17 November	Indonesia International II: Dates: 18 November – 23 November; Host: Yogyakarta, Yogyakarta, Indonesia; Venue: Among Rogo Sports Hall; Level: International Challenge; Prize: $20,000; Format: 64MS/32WS/32MD/32WD/32XD	Score: 21–9, 21–17	
17 November	Indonesia International II: Dates: 18 November – 23 November; Host: Yogyakarta, Yogyakarta, Indonesia; Venue: Among Rogo Sports Hall; Level: International Challenge; Prize: $20,000; Format: 64MS/32WS/32MD/32WD/32XD	(South Korea) Kim Min-ji	(Malaysia) Siti Zulaikha
17 November	Indonesia International II: Dates: 18 November – 23 November; Host: Yogyakarta, Yogyakarta, Indonesia; Venue: Among Rogo Sports Hall; Level: International Challenge; Prize: $20,000; Format: 64MS/32WS/32MD/32WD/32XD	Score: 21–16, 21–18	
17 November	Indonesia International II: Dates: 18 November – 23 November; Host: Yogyakarta, Yogyakarta, Indonesia; Venue: Among Rogo Sports Hall; Level: International Challenge; Prize: $20,000; Format: 64MS/32WS/32MD/32WD/32XD	(Indonesia) Ali Faathir Rayhan (Indonesia) Devin Artha Wahyudi	(Malaysia) Aaron Tai (Malaysia) Tan Zhi Yang
17 November	Indonesia International II: Dates: 18 November – 23 November; Host: Yogyakarta, Yogyakarta, Indonesia; Venue: Among Rogo Sports Hall; Level: International Challenge; Prize: $20,000; Format: 64MS/32WS/32MD/32WD/32XD	Score: 21–15, 21–17	
17 November	Indonesia International II: Dates: 18 November – 23 November; Host: Yogyakarta, Yogyakarta, Indonesia; Venue: Among Rogo Sports Hall; Level: International Challenge; Prize: $20,000; Format: 64MS/32WS/32MD/32WD/32XD	(Chinese Taipei) Lin Chih-chun (Chinese Taipei) Lin Wan-ching	(Chinese Taipei) Chou Yun-an (Chinese Taipei) Sung Yi-hsuan
17 November	Indonesia International II: Dates: 18 November – 23 November; Host: Yogyakarta, Yogyakarta, Indonesia; Venue: Among Rogo Sports Hall; Level: International Challenge; Prize: $20,000; Format: 64MS/32WS/32MD/32WD/32XD	Score: 16–21, 21–16, 21–18	
17 November	Indonesia International II: Dates: 18 November – 23 November; Host: Yogyakarta, Yogyakarta, Indonesia; Venue: Among Rogo Sports Hall; Level: International Challenge; Prize: $20,000; Format: 64MS/32WS/32MD/32WD/32XD	(Indonesia) Bobby Setiabudi (Indonesia) Melati Daeva Oktavianti	(Indonesia) Renaldi Samosir (Indonesia) Masita Mahmudin
17 November	Indonesia International II: Dates: 18 November – 23 November; Host: Yogyakarta, Yogyakarta, Indonesia; Venue: Among Rogo Sports Hall; Level: International Challenge; Prize: $20,000; Format: 64MS/32WS/32MD/32WD/32XD	Score: 21–8, 12–21, 21–12	
17 November	Scottish Open: Dates: 20 November – 23 November; Host: Glasgow, Scotland; Venue: Emirates Arena; Level: International Challenge; Prize: $17,500; Format: 32MS/32WS/32MD/32WD/32XD	(France) Arnaud Merklé	(Finland) Joakim Oldorff
17 November	Scottish Open: Dates: 20 November – 23 November; Host: Glasgow, Scotland; Venue: Emirates Arena; Level: International Challenge; Prize: $17,500; Format: 32MS/32WS/32MD/32WD/32XD	Score: 21–7, 21–17	
17 November	Scottish Open: Dates: 20 November – 23 November; Host: Glasgow, Scotland; Venue: Emirates Arena; Level: International Challenge; Prize: $17,500; Format: 32MS/32WS/32MD/32WD/32XD	(Scotland) Kirsty Gilmour	(South Korea) Kim Joo-eun
17 November	Scottish Open: Dates: 20 November – 23 November; Host: Glasgow, Scotland; Venue: Emirates Arena; Level: International Challenge; Prize: $17,500; Format: 32MS/32WS/32MD/32WD/32XD	Score: 21–15, 17–21, 21–11	
17 November	Scottish Open: Dates: 20 November – 23 November; Host: Glasgow, Scotland; Venue: Emirates Arena; Level: International Challenge; Prize: $17,500; Format: 32MS/32WS/32MD/32WD/32XD	(Denmark) Daniel Lundgaard (Denmark) Mads Vestergaard	(South Korea) Lee Jong-min (South Korea) Wang Chan
17 November	Scottish Open: Dates: 20 November – 23 November; Host: Glasgow, Scotland; Venue: Emirates Arena; Level: International Challenge; Prize: $17,500; Format: 32MS/32WS/32MD/32WD/32XD	Score: 23–21, 14–21, 21–14	
17 November	Scottish Open: Dates: 20 November – 23 November; Host: Glasgow, Scotland; Venue: Emirates Arena; Level: International Challenge; Prize: $17,500; Format: 32MS/32WS/32MD/32WD/32XD	(South Korea) Kim Min-ji (South Korea) Lee Ye-na	(Scotland) Julie MacPherson (Scotland) Ciara Torrance
17 November	Scottish Open: Dates: 20 November – 23 November; Host: Glasgow, Scotland; Venue: Emirates Arena; Level: International Challenge; Prize: $17,500; Format: 32MS/32WS/32MD/32WD/32XD	Score: 21–16, 15–21, 21–15	
17 November	Scottish Open: Dates: 20 November – 23 November; Host: Glasgow, Scotland; Venue: Emirates Arena; Level: International Challenge; Prize: $17,500; Format: 32MS/32WS/32MD/32WD/32XD	(Denmark) Rasmus Espersen (Denmark) Amalie Cecilie Kudsk	(Denmark) Mads Vestergaard (Denmark) Christine Busch
17 November	Scottish Open: Dates: 20 November – 23 November; Host: Glasgow, Scotland; Venue: Emirates Arena; Level: International Challenge; Prize: $17,500; Format: 32MS/32WS/32MD/32WD/32XD	Score: 21–19, 21–18	
17 November	Guatemala International: Dates: 18 November – 23 November; Host: Guatemala City, Guatemala; Venue: Coliseo Deportivo; Level: International Series; Prize: $5,000; Format: 32MS/32WS/8MD/8WD/8XD	(Brazil) Jonathan Matias	(Guatemala) Kevin Cordón
17 November	Guatemala International: Dates: 18 November – 23 November; Host: Guatemala City, Guatemala; Venue: Coliseo Deportivo; Level: International Series; Prize: $5,000; Format: 32MS/32WS/8MD/8WD/8XD	Score: No data	
17 November	Guatemala International: Dates: 18 November – 23 November; Host: Guatemala City, Guatemala; Venue: Coliseo Deportivo; Level: International Series; Prize: $5,000; Format: 32MS/32WS/8MD/8WD/8XD	(United States) Ella Lin	(Czech Republic) Sharleen van Coppenolle
17 November	Guatemala International: Dates: 18 November – 23 November; Host: Guatemala City, Guatemala; Venue: Coliseo Deportivo; Level: International Series; Prize: $5,000; Format: 32MS/32WS/8MD/8WD/8XD	Score: 21–10, 21–17	
17 November	Guatemala International: Dates: 18 November – 23 November; Host: Guatemala City, Guatemala; Venue: Coliseo Deportivo; Level: International Series; Prize: $5,000; Format: 32MS/32WS/8MD/8WD/8XD	(Australia) Pramudya Kusumawardana (Australia) Jack Yu	(United States) Samuel Wales Li (United States) Joshua Yang
17 November	Guatemala International: Dates: 18 November – 23 November; Host: Guatemala City, Guatemala; Venue: Coliseo Deportivo; Level: International Series; Prize: $5,000; Format: 32MS/32WS/8MD/8WD/8XD	Score: 21–14, 21–15	
17 November	Guatemala International: Dates: 18 November – 23 November; Host: Guatemala City, Guatemala; Venue: Coliseo Deportivo; Level: International Series; Prize: $5,000; Format: 32MS/32WS/8MD/8WD/8XD	(Lithuania) Viltė Paulauskaitė (Czech Republic) Sharleen van Coppenolle	(Mexico) Cecilia Madera (Mexico) Isabella Puente
17 November	Guatemala International: Dates: 18 November – 23 November; Host: Guatemala City, Guatemala; Venue: Coliseo Deportivo; Level: International Series; Prize: $5,000; Format: 32MS/32WS/8MD/8WD/8XD	Score: 21–15, 21–11	
17 November	Guatemala International: Dates: 18 November – 23 November; Host: Guatemala City, Guatemala; Venue: Coliseo Deportivo; Level: International Series; Prize: $5,000; Format: 32MS/32WS/8MD/8WD/8XD	(United States) Ryan Ma (United States) Ella Lin	(United States) Srinivas Subash (United States) Shraddha Prakash Saranya
17 November	Guatemala International: Dates: 18 November – 23 November; Host: Guatemala City, Guatemala; Venue: Coliseo Deportivo; Level: International Series; Prize: $5,000; Format: 32MS/32WS/8MD/8WD/8XD	Score: 21–14, 21–13	
17 November	Türkiye International: Dates: 19 November – 23 November; Host: Ankara, Turkey; Venue: Türkiye Badminton Olympic Center Sports Hall; Level: Future Series; Prize: $3,000; Format: 32MS/32WS/32MD/32WD/32XD	(Italy) Christopher Vittoriani	(Spain) Álvaro Leal
17 November	Türkiye International: Dates: 19 November – 23 November; Host: Ankara, Turkey; Venue: Türkiye Badminton Olympic Center Sports Hall; Level: Future Series; Prize: $3,000; Format: 32MS/32WS/32MD/32WD/32XD	Score: 21–16, 21–18	
17 November	Türkiye International: Dates: 19 November – 23 November; Host: Ankara, Turkey; Venue: Türkiye Badminton Olympic Center Sports Hall; Level: Future Series; Prize: $3,000; Format: 32MS/32WS/32MD/32WD/32XD	(Turkey) Özge Bayrak	(Turkey) Ravza Bodur
17 November	Türkiye International: Dates: 19 November – 23 November; Host: Ankara, Turkey; Venue: Türkiye Badminton Olympic Center Sports Hall; Level: Future Series; Prize: $3,000; Format: 32MS/32WS/32MD/32WD/32XD	Score: 21–23, 21–8, 21–13	
17 November	Türkiye International: Dates: 19 November – 23 November; Host: Ankara, Turkey; Venue: Türkiye Badminton Olympic Center Sports Hall; Level: Future Series; Prize: $3,000; Format: 32MS/32WS/32MD/32WD/32XD	(Turkey) Buğra Aktaş (Turkey) Emre Sönmez	(France) Ewan Goulin (France) Arsène Serre
17 November	Türkiye International: Dates: 19 November – 23 November; Host: Ankara, Turkey; Venue: Türkiye Badminton Olympic Center Sports Hall; Level: Future Series; Prize: $3,000; Format: 32MS/32WS/32MD/32WD/32XD	Score: 21–11, 21–14	
17 November	Türkiye International: Dates: 19 November – 23 November; Host: Ankara, Turkey; Venue: Türkiye Badminton Olympic Center Sports Hall; Level: Future Series; Prize: $3,000; Format: 32MS/32WS/32MD/32WD/32XD	(Turkey) Yasemen Bektaş (Turkey) Sinem Yıldız	(Turkey) Elifnur Demir (Turkey) Zeynep Ocakoğlu
17 November	Türkiye International: Dates: 19 November – 23 November; Host: Ankara, Turkey; Venue: Türkiye Badminton Olympic Center Sports Hall; Level: Future Series; Prize: $3,000; Format: 32MS/32WS/32MD/32WD/32XD	Score: 21–12, 21–14	
17 November	Türkiye International: Dates: 19 November – 23 November; Host: Ankara, Turkey; Venue: Türkiye Badminton Olympic Center Sports Hall; Level: Future Series; Prize: $3,000; Format: 32MS/32WS/32MD/32WD/32XD	(Turkey) Emre Sönmez (Turkey) Yasemen Bektaş	(France) Rayan Benaissa (France) Manon Heitzmann
17 November	Türkiye International: Dates: 19 November – 23 November; Host: Ankara, Turkey; Venue: Türkiye Badminton Olympic Center Sports Hall; Level: Future Series; Prize: $3,000; Format: 32MS/32WS/32MD/32WD/32XD	Score: 21–9, 21–6	
17 November	Botswana International: Dates: 20 November – 23 November; Host: Otse, Botswana; Venue: Otse Police College Indoor Gymnasium; Level: Future Series; Format: 32MS/16WS/32MD/8WD/16XD	(Vietnam) Phan Phúc Thịnh	(India) Tanmoy Bikash Boruah
17 November	Botswana International: Dates: 20 November – 23 November; Host: Otse, Botswana; Venue: Otse Police College Indoor Gymnasium; Level: Future Series; Format: 32MS/16WS/32MD/8WD/16XD	Score: 21–13, 9–21, 21–19	
17 November	Botswana International: Dates: 20 November – 23 November; Host: Otse, Botswana; Venue: Otse Police College Indoor Gymnasium; Level: Future Series; Format: 32MS/16WS/32MD/8WD/16XD	(South Africa) Johanita Scholtz	(India) Anvitha Vijay
17 November	Botswana International: Dates: 20 November – 23 November; Host: Otse, Botswana; Venue: Otse Police College Indoor Gymnasium; Level: Future Series; Format: 32MS/16WS/32MD/8WD/16XD	Score: 21–15, 21–16	
17 November	Botswana International: Dates: 20 November – 23 November; Host: Otse, Botswana; Venue: Otse Police College Indoor Gymnasium; Level: Future Series; Format: 32MS/16WS/32MD/8WD/16XD	(India) Tanmoy Bikash Boruah (India) Kuldeep Kamal	(Australia) Avinash Srinivas (Australia) Ephraim Stephen Sam
17 November	Botswana International: Dates: 20 November – 23 November; Host: Otse, Botswana; Venue: Otse Police College Indoor Gymnasium; Level: Future Series; Format: 32MS/16WS/32MD/8WD/16XD	Score: 21–18, 21–14	
17 November	Botswana International: Dates: 20 November – 23 November; Host: Otse, Botswana; Venue: Otse Police College Indoor Gymnasium; Level: Future Series; Format: 32MS/16WS/32MD/8WD/16XD	(South Africa) Amy Ackerman (South Africa) Johanita Scholtz	(Maldives) Aminath Nabeeha Abdul Razzaq (Maldives) Fathimath Nabaaha Abdul Razzaq
17 November	Botswana International: Dates: 20 November – 23 November; Host: Otse, Botswana; Venue: Otse Police College Indoor Gymnasium; Level: Future Series; Format: 32MS/16WS/32MD/8WD/16XD	Score: 19–21, 21–13, 21–15	
17 November	Botswana International: Dates: 20 November – 23 November; Host: Otse, Botswana; Venue: Otse Police College Indoor Gymnasium; Level: Future Series; Format: 32MS/16WS/32MD/8WD/16XD	(South Africa) Robert Summers (South Africa) Amy Ackerman	(South Africa) Caden Kakora (South Africa) Johanita Scholtz
17 November	Botswana International: Dates: 20 November – 23 November; Host: Otse, Botswana; Venue: Otse Police College Indoor Gymnasium; Level: Future Series; Format: 32MS/16WS/32MD/8WD/16XD	Score: 21–10, 16–21, 21–13	
24 November	Syed Modi International (Draw): Dates: 25 November – 30 November; Host: Lucknow, India; Venue: Babu Banarasi Das Indoor Stadium; Level: Super 300; Prize: $240,000; Format: 32MS/32WS/32MD/32WD/32XD	(Hong Kong) Jason Gunawan	(India) Srikanth Kidambi
24 November	Syed Modi International (Draw): Dates: 25 November – 30 November; Host: Lucknow, India; Venue: Babu Banarasi Das Indoor Stadium; Level: Super 300; Prize: $240,000; Format: 32MS/32WS/32MD/32WD/32XD	Score: 21–16, 8–21, 22–20	
24 November	Syed Modi International (Draw): Dates: 25 November – 30 November; Host: Lucknow, India; Venue: Babu Banarasi Das Indoor Stadium; Level: Super 300; Prize: $240,000; Format: 32MS/32WS/32MD/32WD/32XD	(Japan) Hina Akechi	(Turkey) Neslihan Arın
24 November	Syed Modi International (Draw): Dates: 25 November – 30 November; Host: Lucknow, India; Venue: Babu Banarasi Das Indoor Stadium; Level: Super 300; Prize: $240,000; Format: 32MS/32WS/32MD/32WD/32XD	Score: 21–16, 21–14	
24 November	Syed Modi International (Draw): Dates: 25 November – 30 November; Host: Lucknow, India; Venue: Babu Banarasi Das Indoor Stadium; Level: Super 300; Prize: $240,000; Format: 32MS/32WS/32MD/32WD/32XD	(Malaysia) Kang Khai Xing (Malaysia) Aaron Tai	(Malaysia) Chia Wei Jie (Malaysia) Lwi Sheng Hao
24 November	Syed Modi International (Draw): Dates: 25 November – 30 November; Host: Lucknow, India; Venue: Babu Banarasi Das Indoor Stadium; Level: Super 300; Prize: $240,000; Format: 32MS/32WS/32MD/32WD/32XD	Score: 21–9, 21–19	
24 November	Syed Modi International (Draw): Dates: 25 November – 30 November; Host: Lucknow, India; Venue: Babu Banarasi Das Indoor Stadium; Level: Super 300; Prize: $240,000; Format: 32MS/32WS/32MD/32WD/32XD	(India) Treesa Jolly (India) Gayatri Gopichand	(Japan) Kaho Osawa (Japan) Mai Tanabe
24 November	Syed Modi International (Draw): Dates: 25 November – 30 November; Host: Lucknow, India; Venue: Babu Banarasi Das Indoor Stadium; Level: Super 300; Prize: $240,000; Format: 32MS/32WS/32MD/32WD/32XD	Score: 17–21, 21–13, 21–15	
24 November	Syed Modi International (Draw): Dates: 25 November – 30 November; Host: Lucknow, India; Venue: Babu Banarasi Das Indoor Stadium; Level: Super 300; Prize: $240,000; Format: 32MS/32WS/32MD/32WD/32XD	(Indonesia) Dejan Ferdinansyah (Indonesia) Bernadine Wardana	(Thailand) Pakkapon Teeraratsakul (Thailand) Sapsiree Taerattanachai
24 November	Syed Modi International (Draw): Dates: 25 November – 30 November; Host: Lucknow, India; Venue: Babu Banarasi Das Indoor Stadium; Level: Super 300; Prize: $240,000; Format: 32MS/32WS/32MD/32WD/32XD	Score: 21–19, 21–16	
24 November	Welsh International: Dates: 25 November – 29 November; Host: Cardiff, Wales; Venue: Sport Wales National Centre; Level: International Series; Prize: $5,000; Format: 32MS/32WS/32MD/32WD/32XD	(Denmark) Ditlev Jæger Holm	(Austria) Collins Valentine Filimon
24 November	Welsh International: Dates: 25 November – 29 November; Host: Cardiff, Wales; Venue: Sport Wales National Centre; Level: International Series; Prize: $5,000; Format: 32MS/32WS/32MD/32WD/32XD	Score: 21–10, 14–21, 21–5	
24 November	Welsh International: Dates: 25 November – 29 November; Host: Cardiff, Wales; Venue: Sport Wales National Centre; Level: International Series; Prize: $5,000; Format: 32MS/32WS/32MD/32WD/32XD	(Austria) Xu Wei	(Sri Lanka) Ranithma Liyanage
24 November	Welsh International: Dates: 25 November – 29 November; Host: Cardiff, Wales; Venue: Sport Wales National Centre; Level: International Series; Prize: $5,000; Format: 32MS/32WS/32MD/32WD/32XD	Score: 16–21, 21–10, 21–19	
24 November	Welsh International: Dates: 25 November – 29 November; Host: Cardiff, Wales; Venue: Sport Wales National Centre; Level: International Series; Prize: $5,000; Format: 32MS/32WS/32MD/32WD/32XD	(Denmark) Kristoffer Kolding (Denmark) Calvin Lundsgaard	(France) Baptiste Labarthe (France) Quentin Ronget
24 November	Welsh International: Dates: 25 November – 29 November; Host: Cardiff, Wales; Venue: Sport Wales National Centre; Level: International Series; Prize: $5,000; Format: 32MS/32WS/32MD/32WD/32XD	Score: 21–16, 21–15	
24 November	Welsh International: Dates: 25 November – 29 November; Host: Cardiff, Wales; Venue: Sport Wales National Centre; Level: International Series; Prize: $5,000; Format: 32MS/32WS/32MD/32WD/32XD	(Denmark) Simona Pilgaard (Denmark) Signe Schulz	(Denmark) Lærke Hvid (Denmark) Anna Klausholm
24 November	Welsh International: Dates: 25 November – 29 November; Host: Cardiff, Wales; Venue: Sport Wales National Centre; Level: International Series; Prize: $5,000; Format: 32MS/32WS/32MD/32WD/32XD	Score: 21–18, 21–14	
24 November	Welsh International: Dates: 25 November – 29 November; Host: Cardiff, Wales; Venue: Sport Wales National Centre; Level: International Series; Prize: $5,000; Format: 32MS/32WS/32MD/32WD/32XD	(France) Natan Begga (France) Elsa Jacob	(Sweden) Max Svensson (Sweden) Sofia Strömvall
24 November	Welsh International: Dates: 25 November – 29 November; Host: Cardiff, Wales; Venue: Sport Wales National Centre; Level: International Series; Prize: $5,000; Format: 32MS/32WS/32MD/32WD/32XD	Score: 21–18, 21–14	
24 November	El Salvador International: Dates: 25 November – 30 November; Host: San Salvador, El Salvador; Venue: Coliseo de Bádminton “El Polvorín”; Level: Future Series; Format: 32MS/32WS/8MD/8WD/16XD	(Brazil) Jonathan Matias	(Belgium) Charles Fouyn
24 November	El Salvador International: Dates: 25 November – 30 November; Host: San Salvador, El Salvador; Venue: Coliseo de Bádminton “El Polvorín”; Level: Future Series; Format: 32MS/32WS/8MD/8WD/16XD	Score: 21–17, 21–17	
24 November	El Salvador International: Dates: 25 November – 30 November; Host: San Salvador, El Salvador; Venue: Coliseo de Bádminton “El Polvorín”; Level: Future Series; Format: 32MS/32WS/8MD/8WD/16XD	(Lithuania) Viltė Paulauskaitė	(Czech Republic) Sharleen van Coppenolle
24 November	El Salvador International: Dates: 25 November – 30 November; Host: San Salvador, El Salvador; Venue: Coliseo de Bádminton “El Polvorín”; Level: Future Series; Format: 32MS/32WS/8MD/8WD/16XD	Score: 21–16, 16–21, 21–18	
24 November	El Salvador International: Dates: 25 November – 30 November; Host: San Salvador, El Salvador; Venue: Coliseo de Bádminton “El Polvorín”; Level: Future Series; Format: 32MS/32WS/8MD/8WD/16XD	(Australia) Pramudya Kusumawardana (Australia) Jack Yu	(United States) Ryan Nibu (United States) Srinivas Subash
24 November	El Salvador International: Dates: 25 November – 30 November; Host: San Salvador, El Salvador; Venue: Coliseo de Bádminton “El Polvorín”; Level: Future Series; Format: 32MS/32WS/8MD/8WD/16XD	Score: Walkover	
24 November	El Salvador International: Dates: 25 November – 30 November; Host: San Salvador, El Salvador; Venue: Coliseo de Bádminton “El Polvorín”; Level: Future Series; Format: 32MS/32WS/8MD/8WD/16XD	(Lithuania) Viltė Paulauskaitė (Czech Republic) Sharleen van Coppenolle	(El Salvador) Gabriela Barrios (El Salvador) Margareth Revelo
24 November	El Salvador International: Dates: 25 November – 30 November; Host: San Salvador, El Salvador; Venue: Coliseo de Bádminton “El Polvorín”; Level: Future Series; Format: 32MS/32WS/8MD/8WD/16XD	Score: 21–18, 21–10	
24 November	El Salvador International: Dates: 25 November – 30 November; Host: San Salvador, El Salvador; Venue: Coliseo de Bádminton “El Polvorín”; Level: Future Series; Format: 32MS/32WS/8MD/8WD/16XD	(United States) Ansen Liu (United States) Charity Lam	(Belgium) Charles Fouyn (Canada) Katie Watson
24 November	El Salvador International: Dates: 25 November – 30 November; Host: San Salvador, El Salvador; Venue: Coliseo de Bádminton “El Polvorín”; Level: Future Series; Format: 32MS/32WS/8MD/8WD/16XD	Score: 21–14, 21–15	
24 November	South Africa International: Dates: 27 November – 30 November; Host: Cape Town, South Africa; Venue: John Tyers Hall; Level: Future Series; Prize: $6,000; Format: 32MS/32WS/32MD/16WD/32XD	(Vietnam) Phan Phúc Thịnh	(Mauritius) Lucas Douce
24 November	South Africa International: Dates: 27 November – 30 November; Host: Cape Town, South Africa; Venue: John Tyers Hall; Level: Future Series; Prize: $6,000; Format: 32MS/32WS/32MD/16WD/32XD	Score: 21–12, 17–21, 21–16	
24 November	South Africa International: Dates: 27 November – 30 November; Host: Cape Town, South Africa; Venue: John Tyers Hall; Level: Future Series; Prize: $6,000; Format: 32MS/32WS/32MD/16WD/32XD	(Chinese Taipei) Lee Yu-hsuan	(South Africa) Johanita Scholtz
24 November	South Africa International: Dates: 27 November – 30 November; Host: Cape Town, South Africa; Venue: John Tyers Hall; Level: Future Series; Prize: $6,000; Format: 32MS/32WS/32MD/16WD/32XD	Score: 21–17, 21–18	
24 November	South Africa International: Dates: 27 November – 30 November; Host: Cape Town, South Africa; Venue: John Tyers Hall; Level: Future Series; Prize: $6,000; Format: 32MS/32WS/32MD/16WD/32XD	(Australia) Avinash Srinivas (Australia) Ephraim Stephen Sam	(South Africa) Caden Kakora (South Africa) Robert Summers
24 November	South Africa International: Dates: 27 November – 30 November; Host: Cape Town, South Africa; Venue: John Tyers Hall; Level: Future Series; Prize: $6,000; Format: 32MS/32WS/32MD/16WD/32XD	Score: Walkover	
24 November	South Africa International: Dates: 27 November – 30 November; Host: Cape Town, South Africa; Venue: John Tyers Hall; Level: Future Series; Prize: $6,000; Format: 32MS/32WS/32MD/16WD/32XD	(South Africa) Amy Ackerman (South Africa) Johanita Scholtz	(Maldives) Aminath Nabeeha Abdul Razzaq (Maldives) Fathimath Nabaaha Abdul Razzaq
24 November	South Africa International: Dates: 27 November – 30 November; Host: Cape Town, South Africa; Venue: John Tyers Hall; Level: Future Series; Prize: $6,000; Format: 32MS/32WS/32MD/16WD/32XD	Score: 21–9, 24–26, 21–14	
24 November	South Africa International: Dates: 27 November – 30 November; Host: Cape Town, South Africa; Venue: John Tyers Hall; Level: Future Series; Prize: $6,000; Format: 32MS/32WS/32MD/16WD/32XD	(Saudi Arabia) Amer Mohammed (Saudi Arabia) Nabiha Shariff	(South Africa) Robert Summers (South Africa) Amy Ackerman
24 November	South Africa International: Dates: 27 November – 30 November; Host: Cape Town, South Africa; Venue: John Tyers Hall; Level: Future Series; Prize: $6,000; Format: 32MS/32WS/32MD/16WD/32XD	Score: 21–16, 9–15 retired	

=== December ===
Week commencing	Tournament	Champions	Runners-up
1 December	Guwahati Masters (Draw): Dates: 2 December – 7 December; Host: Guwahati, India; Venue: Saru Sajai Indoor Stadium; Level: Super 100; Prize: $110,000; Format: 48MS/32WS/32MD/32WD/32XD	(India) Sanskar Saraswat	(India) Mithun Manjunath
1 December	Guwahati Masters (Draw): Dates: 2 December – 7 December; Host: Guwahati, India; Venue: Saru Sajai Indoor Stadium; Level: Super 100; Prize: $110,000; Format: 48MS/32WS/32MD/32WD/32XD	Score: 21–11, 17–21, 21–13	
1 December	Guwahati Masters (Draw): Dates: 2 December – 7 December; Host: Guwahati, India; Venue: Saru Sajai Indoor Stadium; Level: Super 100; Prize: $110,000; Format: 48MS/32WS/32MD/32WD/32XD	(Chinese Taipei) Tung Ciou-tong	(India) Tanvi Sharma
1 December	Guwahati Masters (Draw): Dates: 2 December – 7 December; Host: Guwahati, India; Venue: Saru Sajai Indoor Stadium; Level: Super 100; Prize: $110,000; Format: 48MS/32WS/32MD/32WD/32XD	Score: 21–18, 21–18	
1 December	Guwahati Masters (Draw): Dates: 2 December – 7 December; Host: Guwahati, India; Venue: Saru Sajai Indoor Stadium; Level: Super 100; Prize: $110,000; Format: 48MS/32WS/32MD/32WD/32XD	(Malaysia) Kang Khai Xing (Malaysia) Aaron Tai	(India) Pruthvi Roy (India) K. Sai Pratheek
1 December	Guwahati Masters (Draw): Dates: 2 December – 7 December; Host: Guwahati, India; Venue: Saru Sajai Indoor Stadium; Level: Super 100; Prize: $110,000; Format: 48MS/32WS/32MD/32WD/32XD	Score: 21–13, 21–18	
1 December	Guwahati Masters (Draw): Dates: 2 December – 7 December; Host: Guwahati, India; Venue: Saru Sajai Indoor Stadium; Level: Super 100; Prize: $110,000; Format: 48MS/32WS/32MD/32WD/32XD	(Indonesia) Isyana Syahira Meida (Indonesia) Rinjani Kwinnara Nastine	(Malaysia) Ong Xin Yee (Malaysia) Carmen Ting
1 December	Guwahati Masters (Draw): Dates: 2 December – 7 December; Host: Guwahati, India; Venue: Saru Sajai Indoor Stadium; Level: Super 100; Prize: $110,000; Format: 48MS/32WS/32MD/32WD/32XD	Score: 21–17, 23–21	
1 December	Guwahati Masters (Draw): Dates: 2 December – 7 December; Host: Guwahati, India; Venue: Saru Sajai Indoor Stadium; Level: Super 100; Prize: $110,000; Format: 48MS/32WS/32MD/32WD/32XD	(Indonesia) Marwan Faza (Indonesia) Aisyah Pranata	(Thailand) Tanadon Punpanich (Thailand) Fungfa Korpthammakit
1 December	Guwahati Masters (Draw): Dates: 2 December – 7 December; Host: Guwahati, India; Venue: Saru Sajai Indoor Stadium; Level: Super 100; Prize: $110,000; Format: 48MS/32WS/32MD/32WD/32XD	Score: 21–14, 21–16	
1 December	Canadian International: Dates: 2 December – 7 December; Host: Ontario, Canada; Venue: Markham Pan Am Centre; Level: International Challenge; Prize: $17,500; Format: 64MS/64WS/32MD/16WD/32XD	(Canada) Victor Lai	(Canada) Brian Yang
1 December	Canadian International: Dates: 2 December – 7 December; Host: Ontario, Canada; Venue: Markham Pan Am Centre; Level: International Challenge; Prize: $17,500; Format: 64MS/64WS/32MD/16WD/32XD	Score: 21–14, 21–15	
1 December	Canadian International: Dates: 2 December – 7 December; Host: Ontario, Canada; Venue: Markham Pan Am Centre; Level: International Challenge; Prize: $17,500; Format: 64MS/64WS/32MD/16WD/32XD	(Canada) Michelle Li	(Canada) Wen Yu Zhang
1 December	Canadian International: Dates: 2 December – 7 December; Host: Ontario, Canada; Venue: Markham Pan Am Centre; Level: International Challenge; Prize: $17,500; Format: 64MS/64WS/32MD/16WD/32XD	Score: 21–19, 21–23, 21–12	
1 December	Canadian International: Dates: 2 December – 7 December; Host: Ontario, Canada; Venue: Markham Pan Am Centre; Level: International Challenge; Prize: $17,500; Format: 64MS/64WS/32MD/16WD/32XD	(United States) Chen Zhi Yi (United States) Presley Smith	(Canada) Kevin Lee (Canada) Ty Alexander Lindeman
1 December	Canadian International: Dates: 2 December – 7 December; Host: Ontario, Canada; Venue: Markham Pan Am Centre; Level: International Challenge; Prize: $17,500; Format: 64MS/64WS/32MD/16WD/32XD	Score: 17–21, 21–15, 21–13	
1 December	Canadian International: Dates: 2 December – 7 December; Host: Ontario, Canada; Venue: Markham Pan Am Centre; Level: International Challenge; Prize: $17,500; Format: 64MS/64WS/32MD/16WD/32XD	(Canada) Jackie Dent (Canada) Crystal Lai	(Canada) Emma Goyette (Canada) Jasmine Yuexin Zhang
1 December	Canadian International: Dates: 2 December – 7 December; Host: Ontario, Canada; Venue: Markham Pan Am Centre; Level: International Challenge; Prize: $17,500; Format: 64MS/64WS/32MD/16WD/32XD	Score: 21–11, 21–18	
1 December	Canadian International: Dates: 2 December – 7 December; Host: Ontario, Canada; Venue: Markham Pan Am Centre; Level: International Challenge; Prize: $17,500; Format: 64MS/64WS/32MD/16WD/32XD	(Canada) Timothy Lock (Canada) Chloe Hoang	(Indonesia) Danang Dwi Septiadi (Indonesia) Serena Kani
1 December	Canadian International: Dates: 2 December – 7 December; Host: Ontario, Canada; Venue: Markham Pan Am Centre; Level: International Challenge; Prize: $17,500; Format: 64MS/64WS/32MD/16WD/32XD	Score: 21–19, 21–19	
8 December	Odisha Masters (Draw): Dates: 9 December – 14 December; Host: Cuttack, Odisha, India; Venue: Jawaharlal Nehru Indoor Stadium, Cuttack; Level: Super 100; Prize: $110,000; Format: 48MS/32WS/32MD/32WD/32XD	(India) Kiran George	(Indonesia) Muhamad Yusuf
8 December	Odisha Masters (Draw): Dates: 9 December – 14 December; Host: Cuttack, Odisha, India; Venue: Jawaharlal Nehru Indoor Stadium, Cuttack; Level: Super 100; Prize: $110,000; Format: 48MS/32WS/32MD/32WD/32XD	Score: 21–14, 13–21, 21–16	
8 December	Odisha Masters (Draw): Dates: 9 December – 14 December; Host: Cuttack, Odisha, India; Venue: Jawaharlal Nehru Indoor Stadium, Cuttack; Level: Super 100; Prize: $110,000; Format: 48MS/32WS/32MD/32WD/32XD	(India) Unnati Hooda	(India) Isharani Baruah
8 December	Odisha Masters (Draw): Dates: 9 December – 14 December; Host: Cuttack, Odisha, India; Venue: Jawaharlal Nehru Indoor Stadium, Cuttack; Level: Super 100; Prize: $110,000; Format: 48MS/32WS/32MD/32WD/32XD	Score: 21–17, 21–10	
8 December	Odisha Masters (Draw): Dates: 9 December – 14 December; Host: Cuttack, Odisha, India; Venue: Jawaharlal Nehru Indoor Stadium, Cuttack; Level: Super 100; Prize: $110,000; Format: 48MS/32WS/32MD/32WD/32XD	(Indonesia) Ali Faathir Rayhan (Indonesia) Devin Artha Wahyudi	(Malaysia) Kang Khai Xing (Malaysia) Aaron Tai
8 December	Odisha Masters (Draw): Dates: 9 December – 14 December; Host: Cuttack, Odisha, India; Venue: Jawaharlal Nehru Indoor Stadium, Cuttack; Level: Super 100; Prize: $110,000; Format: 48MS/32WS/32MD/32WD/32XD	Score: 15–21, 21–12, 21–16	
8 December	Odisha Masters (Draw): Dates: 9 December – 14 December; Host: Cuttack, Odisha, India; Venue: Jawaharlal Nehru Indoor Stadium, Cuttack; Level: Super 100; Prize: $110,000; Format: 48MS/32WS/32MD/32WD/32XD	(Bulgaria) Gabriela Stoeva (Bulgaria) Stefani Stoeva	(Malaysia) Ong Xin Yee (Malaysia) Carmen Ting
8 December	Odisha Masters (Draw): Dates: 9 December – 14 December; Host: Cuttack, Odisha, India; Venue: Jawaharlal Nehru Indoor Stadium, Cuttack; Level: Super 100; Prize: $110,000; Format: 48MS/32WS/32MD/32WD/32XD	Score: 21–19, 21–14	
8 December	Odisha Masters (Draw): Dates: 9 December – 14 December; Host: Cuttack, Odisha, India; Venue: Jawaharlal Nehru Indoor Stadium, Cuttack; Level: Super 100; Prize: $110,000; Format: 48MS/32WS/32MD/32WD/32XD	(Indonesia) Marwan Faza (Indonesia) Aisyah Pranata	(Indonesia) Dejan Ferdinansyah (Indonesia) Bernadine Wardana
8 December	Odisha Masters (Draw): Dates: 9 December – 14 December; Host: Cuttack, Odisha, India; Venue: Jawaharlal Nehru Indoor Stadium, Cuttack; Level: Super 100; Prize: $110,000; Format: 48MS/32WS/32MD/32WD/32XD	Score: 21–15, 21–10	
15 December	BWF World Tour Finals (Draw): Dates: 17 December – 21 December; Host: Hangzhou, China; Venue: Hangzhou Olympic Sports Center; Level: World Tour Finals; Prize: $3,000,000; Format: 8MS/8WS/8MD/8WD/8XD	(France) Christo Popov	(China) Shi Yuqi
15 December	BWF World Tour Finals (Draw): Dates: 17 December – 21 December; Host: Hangzhou, China; Venue: Hangzhou Olympic Sports Center; Level: World Tour Finals; Prize: $3,000,000; Format: 8MS/8WS/8MD/8WD/8XD	Score: 21–19, 21–9	
15 December	BWF World Tour Finals (Draw): Dates: 17 December – 21 December; Host: Hangzhou, China; Venue: Hangzhou Olympic Sports Center; Level: World Tour Finals; Prize: $3,000,000; Format: 8MS/8WS/8MD/8WD/8XD	(South Korea) An Se-young	(China) Wang Zhiyi
15 December	BWF World Tour Finals (Draw): Dates: 17 December – 21 December; Host: Hangzhou, China; Venue: Hangzhou Olympic Sports Center; Level: World Tour Finals; Prize: $3,000,000; Format: 8MS/8WS/8MD/8WD/8XD	Score: 21–13, 18–21, 21–10	
15 December	BWF World Tour Finals (Draw): Dates: 17 December – 21 December; Host: Hangzhou, China; Venue: Hangzhou Olympic Sports Center; Level: World Tour Finals; Prize: $3,000,000; Format: 8MS/8WS/8MD/8WD/8XD	(South Korea) Kim Won-ho (South Korea) Seo Seung-jae	(China) Liang Weikeng (China) Wang Chang
15 December	BWF World Tour Finals (Draw): Dates: 17 December – 21 December; Host: Hangzhou, China; Venue: Hangzhou Olympic Sports Center; Level: World Tour Finals; Prize: $3,000,000; Format: 8MS/8WS/8MD/8WD/8XD	Score: 21–18, 21–14	
15 December	BWF World Tour Finals (Draw): Dates: 17 December – 21 December; Host: Hangzhou, China; Venue: Hangzhou Olympic Sports Center; Level: World Tour Finals; Prize: $3,000,000; Format: 8MS/8WS/8MD/8WD/8XD	(South Korea) Baek Ha-na (South Korea) Lee So-hee	(Japan) Yuki Fukushima (Japan) Mayu Matsumoto
15 December	BWF World Tour Finals (Draw): Dates: 17 December – 21 December; Host: Hangzhou, China; Venue: Hangzhou Olympic Sports Center; Level: World Tour Finals; Prize: $3,000,000; Format: 8MS/8WS/8MD/8WD/8XD	Score: 21–17, 21–11	
15 December	BWF World Tour Finals (Draw): Dates: 17 December – 21 December; Host: Hangzhou, China; Venue: Hangzhou Olympic Sports Center; Level: World Tour Finals; Prize: $3,000,000; Format: 8MS/8WS/8MD/8WD/8XD	(China) Feng Yanzhe (China) Huang Dongping	(China) Jiang Zhenbang (China) Wei Yaxin
15 December	BWF World Tour Finals (Draw): Dates: 17 December – 21 December; Host: Hangzhou, China; Venue: Hangzhou Olympic Sports Center; Level: World Tour Finals; Prize: $3,000,000; Format: 8MS/8WS/8MD/8WD/8XD	Score: 21–12, 21–17	
15 December	Bangladesh International: Dates: 16 December – 20 December; Host: Dhaka, Bangladesh; Venue: Shaheed Tajuddin Ahmed Indoor Stadium; Level: International Challenge; Prize: $17,500; Format: 64MS/32WS/32MD/16WD/16XD	(India) Meiraba Maisnam	(India) Numair Shaik
15 December	Bangladesh International: Dates: 16 December – 20 December; Host: Dhaka, Bangladesh; Venue: Shaheed Tajuddin Ahmed Indoor Stadium; Level: International Challenge; Prize: $17,500; Format: 64MS/32WS/32MD/16WD/16XD	Score: 21–7, 21–12	
15 December	Bangladesh International: Dates: 16 December – 20 December; Host: Dhaka, Bangladesh; Venue: Shaheed Tajuddin Ahmed Indoor Stadium; Level: International Challenge; Prize: $17,500; Format: 64MS/32WS/32MD/16WD/16XD	(United States) Ishika Jaiswal	(India) Tanvi Reddy Andluri
15 December	Bangladesh International: Dates: 16 December – 20 December; Host: Dhaka, Bangladesh; Venue: Shaheed Tajuddin Ahmed Indoor Stadium; Level: International Challenge; Prize: $17,500; Format: 64MS/32WS/32MD/16WD/16XD	Score: 22–20, 21–23, 21–17	
15 December	Bangladesh International: Dates: 16 December – 20 December; Host: Dhaka, Bangladesh; Venue: Shaheed Tajuddin Ahmed Indoor Stadium; Level: International Challenge; Prize: $17,500; Format: 64MS/32WS/32MD/16WD/16XD	(India) Niranjaan Nandakumar (India) Ruban Kumar Rethinasabapathi	(Vietnam) Dang Khac Dang Khanh (Vietnam) Trần Hoàng Kha
15 December	Bangladesh International: Dates: 16 December – 20 December; Host: Dhaka, Bangladesh; Venue: Shaheed Tajuddin Ahmed Indoor Stadium; Level: International Challenge; Prize: $17,500; Format: 64MS/32WS/32MD/16WD/16XD	Score: 21–19, 21–12	
15 December	Bangladesh International: Dates: 16 December – 20 December; Host: Dhaka, Bangladesh; Venue: Shaheed Tajuddin Ahmed Indoor Stadium; Level: International Challenge; Prize: $17,500; Format: 64MS/32WS/32MD/16WD/16XD	(Thailand) Phattharin Aiamvareesrisakul (Thailand) Sarisa Janpeng	(Malaysia) Gan Min Yee (Malaysia) Tan Zhing Hui
15 December	Bangladesh International: Dates: 16 December – 20 December; Host: Dhaka, Bangladesh; Venue: Shaheed Tajuddin Ahmed Indoor Stadium; Level: International Challenge; Prize: $17,500; Format: 64MS/32WS/32MD/16WD/16XD	Score: 21–7, 20–22, 21–15	
15 December	Bangladesh International: Dates: 16 December – 20 December; Host: Dhaka, Bangladesh; Venue: Shaheed Tajuddin Ahmed Indoor Stadium; Level: International Challenge; Prize: $17,500; Format: 64MS/32WS/32MD/16WD/16XD	(Malaysia) Datu Anif Isaac Datu Asrah (Malaysia) Clarissa San	(Bangladesh) Al-Amin Jumar (Bangladesh) Urmi Akter
15 December	Bangladesh International: Dates: 16 December – 20 December; Host: Dhaka, Bangladesh; Venue: Shaheed Tajuddin Ahmed Indoor Stadium; Level: International Challenge; Prize: $17,500; Format: 64MS/32WS/32MD/16WD/16XD	Score: 27–25, 21–14	
15 December	Astana International: Dates: 17 December – 21 December; Host: Astana, Kazakhstan; Venue: Beeline Arena; Level: International Challenge; Prize: $17,500; Format: 64MS/32WS/32MD/32WD/32XD	(Indonesia) Muhamad Yusuf	(Indonesia) Prahdiska Bagas Shujiwo
15 December	Astana International: Dates: 17 December – 21 December; Host: Astana, Kazakhstan; Venue: Beeline Arena; Level: International Challenge; Prize: $17,500; Format: 64MS/32WS/32MD/32WD/32XD	Score: 21–19, 18–21, 21–16	
15 December	Astana International: Dates: 17 December – 21 December; Host: Astana, Kazakhstan; Venue: Beeline Arena; Level: International Challenge; Prize: $17,500; Format: 64MS/32WS/32MD/32WD/32XD	(Indonesia) Thalita Ramadhani Wiryawan	(Ukraine) Polina Buhrova
15 December	Astana International: Dates: 17 December – 21 December; Host: Astana, Kazakhstan; Venue: Beeline Arena; Level: International Challenge; Prize: $17,500; Format: 64MS/32WS/32MD/32WD/32XD	Score: 21–7, 21–14	
15 December	Astana International: Dates: 17 December – 21 December; Host: Astana, Kazakhstan; Venue: Beeline Arena; Level: International Challenge; Prize: $17,500; Format: 64MS/32WS/32MD/32WD/32XD	(Indonesia) Muhammad Rian Ardianto (Indonesia) Rahmat Hidayat	(Individual Neutral Athletes) Rodion Alimov (Individual Neutral Athletes) Maksim Ogloblin
15 December	Astana International: Dates: 17 December – 21 December; Host: Astana, Kazakhstan; Venue: Beeline Arena; Level: International Challenge; Prize: $17,500; Format: 64MS/32WS/32MD/32WD/32XD	Score: 21–10, 21–14	
15 December	Astana International: Dates: 17 December – 21 December; Host: Astana, Kazakhstan; Venue: Beeline Arena; Level: International Challenge; Prize: $17,500; Format: 64MS/32WS/32MD/32WD/32XD	(Ukraine) Polina Buhrova (Ukraine) Yevheniia Kantemyr	(Indonesia) Lanny Tria Mayasari (Indonesia) Amallia Cahaya Pratiwi
15 December	Astana International: Dates: 17 December – 21 December; Host: Astana, Kazakhstan; Venue: Beeline Arena; Level: International Challenge; Prize: $17,500; Format: 64MS/32WS/32MD/32WD/32XD	Score: 21–12, 11–21, 21–13	
15 December	Astana International: Dates: 17 December – 21 December; Host: Astana, Kazakhstan; Venue: Beeline Arena; Level: International Challenge; Prize: $17,500; Format: 64MS/32WS/32MD/32WD/32XD	(Indonesia) Bimo Prasetyo (Indonesia) Arlya Nabila Thesya Munggaran	(Serbia) Mihajlo Tomić (Serbia) Andjela Vitman
15 December	Astana International: Dates: 17 December – 21 December; Host: Astana, Kazakhstan; Venue: Beeline Arena; Level: International Challenge; Prize: $17,500; Format: 64MS/32WS/32MD/32WD/32XD	Score: 19–21, 21–14, 21–13	
22 December	Bangladesh International: Dates: 22 December – 26 December; Host: Dhaka, Bangladesh; Venue: Shaheed Tajuddin Ahmed Indoor Stadium; Level: International Series; Prize: $5,000; Format: 64MS/32WS/32MD/16WD/16XD	(Kazakhstan) Dmitriy Panarin	(Malaysia) Mohamad Rushdan
22 December	Bangladesh International: Dates: 22 December – 26 December; Host: Dhaka, Bangladesh; Venue: Shaheed Tajuddin Ahmed Indoor Stadium; Level: International Series; Prize: $5,000; Format: 64MS/32WS/32MD/16WD/16XD	Score: 21–16, 14–21, 21–10	
22 December	Bangladesh International: Dates: 22 December – 26 December; Host: Dhaka, Bangladesh; Venue: Shaheed Tajuddin Ahmed Indoor Stadium; Level: International Series; Prize: $5,000; Format: 64MS/32WS/32MD/16WD/16XD	(India) Tanvi Reddy Andluri	(Malaysia) Lim Zhi Shin
22 December	Bangladesh International: Dates: 22 December – 26 December; Host: Dhaka, Bangladesh; Venue: Shaheed Tajuddin Ahmed Indoor Stadium; Level: International Series; Prize: $5,000; Format: 64MS/32WS/32MD/16WD/16XD	Score: 21–19, 21–9	
22 December	Bangladesh International: Dates: 22 December – 26 December; Host: Dhaka, Bangladesh; Venue: Shaheed Tajuddin Ahmed Indoor Stadium; Level: International Series; Prize: $5,000; Format: 64MS/32WS/32MD/16WD/16XD	(Bangladesh) Gourab Singha (Bangladesh) Abdul Jahir Tanvir	(Bangladesh) Md Rahatun Nayem (Bangladesh) Md Mizanoor Rahman
22 December	Bangladesh International: Dates: 22 December – 26 December; Host: Dhaka, Bangladesh; Venue: Shaheed Tajuddin Ahmed Indoor Stadium; Level: International Series; Prize: $5,000; Format: 64MS/32WS/32MD/16WD/16XD	Score: 21–19, 17–21, 22–20	
22 December	Bangladesh International: Dates: 22 December – 26 December; Host: Dhaka, Bangladesh; Venue: Shaheed Tajuddin Ahmed Indoor Stadium; Level: International Series; Prize: $5,000; Format: 64MS/32WS/32MD/16WD/16XD	(Thailand) Thitiwarada Buakaew (Thailand) Sarisa Janpeng	(Malaysia) Gan Min Yee (Malaysia) Tan Zhing Hui
22 December	Bangladesh International: Dates: 22 December – 26 December; Host: Dhaka, Bangladesh; Venue: Shaheed Tajuddin Ahmed Indoor Stadium; Level: International Series; Prize: $5,000; Format: 64MS/32WS/32MD/16WD/16XD	Score: 21–13, 17–21, 21–17	
22 December	Bangladesh International: Dates: 22 December – 26 December; Host: Dhaka, Bangladesh; Venue: Shaheed Tajuddin Ahmed Indoor Stadium; Level: International Series; Prize: $5,000; Format: 64MS/32WS/32MD/16WD/16XD	(Malaysia) Datu Anif Isaac Datu Asrah (Malaysia) Clarissa San	(Malaysia) Wee Yee Tern (Malaysia) Tan Zhing Hui
22 December	Bangladesh International: Dates: 22 December – 26 December; Host: Dhaka, Bangladesh; Venue: Shaheed Tajuddin Ahmed Indoor Stadium; Level: International Series; Prize: $5,000; Format: 64MS/32WS/32MD/16WD/16XD	Score: 21–13, 21–15	
22 December	Mongolia International (cancelled): Dates: 23 December – 28 December; Host: Ulaanbaatar, Mongolia; Venue: National Sports Center; Level: International Challenge; Prize: $17,500; Format: TBC		
22 December	Mongolia International (cancelled): Dates: 23 December – 28 December; Host: Ulaanbaatar, Mongolia; Venue: National Sports Center; Level: International Challenge; Prize: $17,500; Format: TBC	Score:	
22 December	Mongolia International (cancelled): Dates: 23 December – 28 December; Host: Ulaanbaatar, Mongolia; Venue: National Sports Center; Level: International Challenge; Prize: $17,500; Format: TBC	Score:	
22 December	Mongolia International (cancelled): Dates: 23 December – 28 December; Host: Ulaanbaatar, Mongolia; Venue: National Sports Center; Level: International Challenge; Prize: $17,500; Format: TBC	Score:	
22 December	Mongolia International (cancelled): Dates: 23 December – 28 December; Host: Ulaanbaatar, Mongolia; Venue: National Sports Center; Level: International Challenge; Prize: $17,500; Format: TBC	Score:	
22 December	Mongolia International (cancelled): Dates: 23 December – 28 December; Host: Ulaanbaatar, Mongolia; Venue: National Sports Center; Level: International Challenge; Prize: $17,500; Format: TBC	Score:	

== Retirements ==
Following is a list of notable players (winners of the main tour title, and/or part of the BWF Rankings top 100 for at least one week) who announced their retirement from professional badminton, during the 2025 season:

- Linda Efler (born 23 January 1995 in Emsdetten, North Rhine-Westphalia, Germany) reached a career-high ranking of No. 12 in the mixed doubles on 5 July 2018. She announced her retirement on 2 December 2024. The 2025 European Mixed Team Badminton Championships was her last tournament.
- Hendra Setiawan (born 25 August 1984 in Pemalang, Central Java, Indonesia) reached a career-high ranking of No. 1 in the men's doubles on 27 September 2007. He became Olympic champion in 2008 and is also a 4-time World Champion. He announced his retirement on 3 December 2024. The 2025 Indonesia Masters was his last tournament.
- Mohammad Ahsan (born 7 September 1987 in Palembang, South Sumatra, Indonesia) reached a career-high ranking of No. 1 in the men's doubles on 21 November 2013. He was a 3-time World Champion. He announced his retirement on 10 December 2024 following his partner Hendra Setiawan. The 2025 Indonesia Masters was his last tournament.
- Tan Kian Meng (born 1 June 1994 in Johor Bahru, Malaysia) reached a career-high ranking of No. 5 in the mixed doubles on 20 December 2022. The 2025 All England was his last tournament.
- Vivian Hoo (born 19 March 1990 in Kuala Lumpur, Malaysia) reached a career-high ranking of No. 9 in the women's doubles on 19 November 2015. She has won two Commonwealth Games gold medals with different partners in the 2014 Glasgow and 2018 Gold Coast. The 2025 Malaysia Open was her last tournament.
- Gregory Mairs (born 7 December 1994 in Manchester, England) reached a career high of world number 28 in the mixed doubles on 17 January 2023. He announce his retirement through his YouTube channel, Badminton Insight in March 2023, and the 2025 All England Open was his last tournament.
- Jenny Mairs (born 31 August 1995 in Chester, Cheshire, England) reached a career high of world number 28 in the mixed doubles on 17 January 2023. Together with Gregory Mairs, she announce her retirement through their YouTube channel, Badminton Insight in March 2023, and the 2025 All England Open was her last tournament.
- B. Sumeeth Reddy (born 26 September 1991 in Gungal, Ranga Reddy, Telangana, India) reached a career-high ranking of No. 17 in the men's doubles on 30 July 2015, and no. 25 in the mixed doubles on 18 March 2025. He announced his retirement on 25 March 2025. The 2024 Syed Modi International was his last tournament.
- Yoshinori Takeuchi (born 8 October 1992 in Saitama Prefecture, Japan) reached a career-high ranking of No. 26 in the men's doubles on 19 September 2023. He announced his retirement via Instagram on 28 March 2025. The 2024 Thailand International was his last tournament.
- Yuki Kaneko (born 22 July 1994 in Koshigaya, Saitama Prefecture, Japan) reached a career-high ranking of No. 7 in men's doubles on 12 July 2018 and No. 12 in mixed doubles on 27 December 2022. The BIPROGY badminton team announced Kaneko's retirement on 31 March 2025. The 2024 Japan Open was his last tournament.
- Jessica Tan (born 16 July 1993 in Singapore) reached a career-high ranking of No. 13 in mixed doubles on 3 January 2023. She announced her retirement on 11 April 2025. The 2024 Macau Open was her last tournament.
- Loh Kean Hean (born 12 March 1995 in Penang, Malaysia) reached a career-high ranking of No. 22 in men's doubles on 27 December 2022. He announced his retirement on 4 May 2025. The 2025 Singapore International was his last tournament.
- (Chinese Taipei) Tai Tzu-ying (born 20 June 1994 in Kaohsiung, Taiwan) reached a career-high ranking of No.1 in women's singles on 1 December 2016, and last for a record-long 214 weeks. She was the silver medalist of 2020 Summer Olympics, and the 2021 World Championships, and also a gold medallist of 2018 Asian Games. She announced her retirement via her Instagram on 7 November 2025. The 2024 China Open was her last tournament.
