= 2025 BWF World Tour =

Tournament details
- Dates: 7 January – 21 December
- Edition: 8th

The 2025 BWF World Tour (officially known as the 2025 HSBC BWF World Tour for sponsorship reasons) is the 8th season of the BWF World Tour of badminton, a circuit of 29 tournaments leading up to the World Tour Finals. The 30 tournaments are divided into five levels: Level 1, the World Tour Finals; Level 2, Super 1000 (4 tournaments); Level 3, Super 750 (6 tournaments); Level 4, Super 500 (9 tournaments); and Level 5, Super 300 (10 tournaments). Each of these tournaments offers different ranking points and prize money. The highest points and prize pools are offered at the Super 1000 level (including the World Tour Finals).

Another tournament category, the BWF Tour Super 100 (level 6), also offers BWF World Tour ranking points. This category also serves as an important pathway and entry point for players to the BWF World Tour. BWF has announced that there will be ten tournaments for the BWF Tour Super 100 in 2025.

== Results ==
Below is the schedule released by the Badminton World Federation:

== Key ==
World Tour Finals
Super 1000 (4)
Super 750 (6)
Super 500 (9)
Super 300 (10)
Super 100 (10)

== Winners ==
Tour	Report	Men's singles	Women's singles	Men's doubles	Women's doubles	Mixed doubles
World Tour Finals
BWF World Tour Finals	Report	(France) Christo Popov	(South Korea) An Se-young	(South Korea) Kim Won-ho (South Korea) Seo Seung-jae	(South Korea) Baek Ha-na (South Korea) Lee So-hee	(China) Feng Yanzhe (China) Huang Dongping
Super 1000
Malaysia Open	Report	(China) Shi Yuqi	(South Korea) An Se-young	(South Korea) Kim Won-ho (South Korea) Seo Seung-jae	(Japan) Yuki Fukushima (Japan) Mayu Matsumoto	(Thailand) Dechapol Puavaranukroh (Thailand) Supissara Paewsampran
All England Open	Report	(China) Shi Yuqi	(South Korea) An Se-young	(South Korea) Kim Won-ho (South Korea) Seo Seung-jae	(Japan) Nami Matsuyama (Japan) Chiharu Shida	(China) Guo Xinwa (China) Chen Fanghui
Indonesia Open	Report	(Denmark) Anders Antonsen	(South Korea) An Se-young	(South Korea) Kim Won-ho (South Korea) Seo Seung-jae	(China) Liu Shengshu (China) Tan Ning	(France) Thom Gicquel (France) Delphine Delrue
China Open	Report	(China) Shi Yuqi	(China) Wang Zhiyi	(Indonesia) Fajar Alfian (Indonesia) Muhammad Shohibul Fikri	(China) Liu Shengshu (China) Tan Ning	(China) Feng Yanzhe (China) Huang Dongping
Super 750
India Open	Report	(Denmark) Viktor Axelsen	(South Korea) An Se-young	(Malaysia) Goh Sze Fei (Malaysia) Nur Izzuddin	(Japan) Arisa Igarashi (Japan) Ayako Sakuramoto	(China) Jiang Zhenbang (China) Wei Yaxin
Singapore Open	Report	(Thailand) Kunlavut Vitidsarn	(China) Chen Yufei	(Malaysia) Aaron Chia (Malaysia) Soh Wooi Yik	(South Korea) Kim Hye-jeong (South Korea) Kong Hee-yong	(Thailand) Dechapol Puavaranukroh (Thailand) Supissara Paewsampran
Japan Open	Report	(China) Shi Yuqi	(South Korea) An Se-young	(South Korea) Kim Won-ho (South Korea) Seo Seung-jae	(China) Liu Shengshu (China) Tan Ning	(China) Jiang Zhenbang (China) Wei Yaxin
China Masters	Report	(China) Weng Hongyang	(South Korea) An Se-young	(South Korea) Kim Won-ho (South Korea) Seo Seung-jae	(China) Jia Yifan (China) Zhang Shuxian	(Thailand) Dechapol Puavaranukroh (Thailand) Supissara Paewsampran
Denmark Open	Report	(Indonesia) Jonatan Christie	(South Korea) An Se-young	(Japan) Takuro Hoki (Japan) Yugo Kobayashi	(South Korea) Baek Ha-na (South Korea) Lee So-hee	(China) Feng Yanzhe (China) Huang Dongping
French Open	Report	(Denmark) Anders Antonsen	(South Korea) An Se-young	(South Korea) Kim Won-ho (South Korea) Seo Seung-jae	(Japan) Yuki Fukushima (Japan) Mayu Matsumoto	(China) Feng Yanzhe (China) Huang Dongping
Super 500
Indonesia Masters	Report	(Thailand) Kunlavut Vitidsarn	(Thailand) Ratchanok Intanon	(Malaysia) Man Wei Chong (Malaysia) Tee Kai Wun	(South Korea) Kim Hye-jeong (South Korea) Kong Hee-yong	(Japan) Hiroki Midorikawa (Japan) Natsu Saito
Thailand Open	Report	(Thailand) Kunlavut Vitidsarn	(China) Chen Yufei	(Malaysia) Aaron Chia (Malaysia) Soh Wooi Yik	(Malaysia) Pearly Tan (Malaysia) Thinaah Muralitharan	(China) Feng Yanzhe (China) Huang Dongping
Malaysia Masters	Report	(China) Li Shifeng	(China) Wang Zhiyi	(Malaysia) Man Wei Chong (Malaysia) Tee Kai Wun	(China) Liu Shengshu (China) Tan Ning	(China) Feng Yanzhe (China) Huang Dongping
Hong Kong Open	Report	(China) Li Shifeng	(China) Wang Zhiyi	(China) Liang Weikeng (China) Wang Chang	(China) Jia Yifan (China) Zhang Shuxian	(China) Feng Yanzhe (China) Huang Dongping
Korea Open	Report	(Indonesia) Jonatan Christie	(Japan) Akane Yamaguchi	(South Korea) Kim Won-ho (South Korea) Seo Seung-jae	(South Korea) Kim Hye-jeong (South Korea) Kong Hee-yong	(China) Feng Yanzhe (China) Huang Dongping
Arctic Open	Report	(Chinese Taipei) Chou Tien-chen	(Japan) Akane Yamaguchi	(England) Ben Lane (England) Sean Vendy	(Malaysia) Pearly Tan (Malaysia) Thinaah Muralitharan	(China) Jiang Zhenbang (China) Wei Yaxin
Hylo Open	Report	(Indonesia) Jonatan Christie	(Denmark) Mia Blichfeldt	(Chinese Taipei) Chiu Hsiang-chieh (Chinese Taipei) Wang Chi-lin	(France) Margot Lambert (France) Camille Pognante	(Denmark) Mathias Christiansen (Denmark) Alexandra Bøje
Japan Masters	Report	(Japan) Kodai Naraoka	(Thailand) Ratchanok Intanon	(South Korea) Kim Won-ho (South Korea) Seo Seung-jae	(Malaysia) Pearly Tan (Malaysia) Thinaah Muralitharan	(Thailand) Dechapol Puavaranukroh (Thailand) Supissara Paewsampran
Australian Open	Report	(India) Lakshya Sen	(South Korea) An Se-young	(Indonesia) Raymond Indra (Indonesia) Nikolaus Joaquin	(Indonesia) Rachel Allessya Rose (Indonesia) Febi Setianingrum	(Malaysia) Chen Tang Jie (Malaysia) Toh Ee Wei
Super 300
Thailand Masters	Report	(Singapore) Jason Teh	(Thailand) Pornpawee Chochuwong	(South Korea) Jin Yong (South Korea) Seo Seung-jae	(Indonesia) Lanny Tria Mayasari (Indonesia) Siti Fadia Silva Ramadhanti	(Thailand) Dechapol Puavaranukroh (Thailand) Supissara Paewsampran
German Open	Report	(Denmark) Viktor Axelsen	(Singapore) Yeo Jia Min	(South Korea) Kim Won-ho (South Korea) Seo Seung-jae	(Japan) Mizuki Otake (Japan) Miyu Takahashi	(Netherlands) Robin Tabeling (Denmark) Alexandra Bøje
Orléans Masters	Report	(France) Alex Lanier	(South Korea) An Se-young	(South Korea) Kang Min-hyuk (South Korea) Ki Dong-ju	(South Korea) Kim Hye-jeong (South Korea) Kong Hee-yong	(Denmark) Jesper Toft (Denmark) Amalie Magelund
Swiss Open	Report	(China) Weng Hongyang	(China) Chen Yufei	(Thailand) Kittinupong Kedren (Thailand) Dechapol Puavaranukroh	(China) Jia Yifan (China) Zhang Shuxian	(China) Feng Yanzhe (China) Wei Yaxin
Spain Masters	Cancelled					
Taipei Open	Report	(Singapore) Loh Kean Yew	(Japan) Tomoka Miyazaki	(Chinese Taipei) Chiu Hsiang-chieh (Chinese Taipei) Wang Chi-lin	(Chinese Taipei) Hsieh Pei-shan (Chinese Taipei) Hung En-tzu	(Indonesia) Jafar Hidayatullah (Indonesia) Felisha Pasaribu
U.S. Open	Report	(India) Ayush Shetty	(United States) Beiwen Zhang	(Chinese Taipei) Lai Po-yu (Chinese Taipei) Tsai Fu-cheng	(Thailand) Benyapa Aimsaard (Thailand) Nuntakarn Aimsaard	(Denmark) Rasmus Espersen (Denmark) Amalie Cecilie Kudsk
Canada Open	Report	(Japan) Kenta Nishimoto	(Japan) Manami Suizu	(Chinese Taipei) Lee Fang-chih (Chinese Taipei) Lee Fang-jen	(Thailand) Benyapa Aimsaard (Thailand) Nuntakarn Aimsaard	(Thailand) Ruttanapak Oupthong (Thailand) Jhenicha Sudjaipraparat
Macau Open	Report	(Indonesia) Alwi Farhan	(China) Chen Yufei	(Malaysia) Junaidi Arif (Malaysia) Yap Roy King	(Chinese Taipei) Hsieh Pei-shan (Chinese Taipei) Hung En-tzu	(Denmark) Mathias Christiansen (Denmark) Alexandra Bøje
Korea Masters	Report	(Singapore) Jason Teh	(Chinese Taipei) Chiu Pin-chian	(South Korea) Lee Jong-min (South Korea) Wang Chan	(Japan) Hinata Suzuki (Japan) Nao Yamakita	(South Korea) Kim Jae-hyeon (South Korea) Jeong Na-eun
Syed Modi International	Report	(Hong Kong) Jason Gunawan	(Japan) Hina Akechi	(Malaysia) Kang Khai Xing (Malaysia) Aaron Tai	(India) Treesa Jolly (India) Gayatri Gopichand Pullela	(Indonesia) Dejan Ferdinansyah (Indonesia) Bernadine Anindya Wardana
Super 100
Ruichang China Masters	Report	(China) Sun Chao	(China) Zhang Yiman	(China) Chen Yongrui (China) Chen Zhehan	(China) Chen Xiaofei (China) Feng Xueying	(Hong Kong) Tang Chun Man (Hong Kong) Ng Tsz Yau
Baoji China Masters	Report	(China) Sun Chao	(Thailand) Pitchamon Opatniputh	(China) Hu Keyuan (China) Lin Xiangyi	(China) Luo Yi (China) Wang Tingge	(Thailand) Ruttanapak Oupthong (Thailand) Benyapa Aimsaard
Vietnam Open	Report	(Thailand) Panitchaphon Teeraratsakul	(China) Cai Yanyan	(South Korea) Jin Yong (South Korea) Na Sung-seung	(China) Luo Yi (China) Wang Tingge	(Indonesia) Marwan Faza (Indonesia) Aisyah Salsabila Putri Pranata
Indonesia Masters Super 100 I	Report	(Indonesia) Chico Aura Dwi Wardoyo	(Chinese Taipei) Huang Yu-hsun	(South Korea) Jin Yong (South Korea) Na Sung-seung	(Chinese Taipei) Lin Xiao-min (Chinese Taipei) Wang Yu-qiao	(Denmark) Mathias Christiansen (Denmark) Alexandra Bøje
Kaohsiung Masters	Report	(Chinese Taipei) Wang Po-wei	(Japan) Nozomi Okuhara	(Japan) Kakeru Kumagai (Japan) Hiroki Nishi	(Japan) Ririna Hiramoto (Japan) Kokona Ishikawa	(Japan) Akira Koga (Japan) Yuho Imai
Al Ain Masters	Report	(Finland) Joakim Oldorff	(India) Shriyanshi Valishetty	(India) Hariharan Amsakarunan (India) Arjun M. R.	(Bulgaria) Gabriela Stoeva (Bulgaria) Stefani Stoeva	(Indonesia) Dejan Ferdinansyah (Indonesia) Bernadine Wardana
Malaysia Super 100	Report	(China) Dong Tianyao	(Japan) Nozomi Okuhara	(Malaysia) Kang Khai Xing (Malaysia) Aaron Tai	(China) Luo Yi (China) Wang Tingge	(Japan) Yuta Watanabe (Japan) Maya Taguchi
Indonesia Masters Super 100 II	Report	(Indonesia) Zaki Ubaidillah	(Japan) Nozomi Okuhara	(Indonesia) Raymond Indra (Indonesia) Nikolaus Joaquin	(Indonesia) Apriyani Rahayu (Indonesia) Siti Fadia Silva Ramadhanti	(Indonesia) Marwan Faza (Indonesia) Aisyah Salsabila Putri Pranata
Guwahati Masters	Report	(India) Sanskar Saraswat	(Chinese Taipei) Tung Ciou-tong	(Malaysia) Kang Khai Xing (Malaysia) Aaron Tai	(Indonesia) Isyana Syahira Meida (Indonesia) Rinjani Kwinnara Nastine	(Indonesia) Marwan Faza (Indonesia) Aisyah Salsabila Putri Pranata
Odisha Masters	Report	(India) Kiran George	(India) Unnati Hooda	(Indonesia) Ali Faathir Rayhan (Indonesia) Devin Artha Wahyudi	(Bulgaria) Gabriela Stoeva (Bulgaria) Stefani Stoeva	(Indonesia) Marwan Faza (Indonesia) Aisyah Salsabila Putri Pranata

== Finals ==
This is the complete schedule of events on the 2025 calendar, with the champions and runners-up documented.

=== January ===
Date	Tournament	Champions	Runners-up
7–12 January	Malaysia Open (Draw): Host: Kuala Lumpur, Malaysia; Venue: Axiata Arena; Level: Super 1000; Prize: $1,450,000; Format: 32MS/32WS/32MD/32WD/32XD	(China) Shi Yuqi	(Denmark) Anders Antonsen
7–12 January	Malaysia Open (Draw): Host: Kuala Lumpur, Malaysia; Venue: Axiata Arena; Level: Super 1000; Prize: $1,450,000; Format: 32MS/32WS/32MD/32WD/32XD	Score: 21–8, 21–15	
7–12 January	Malaysia Open (Draw): Host: Kuala Lumpur, Malaysia; Venue: Axiata Arena; Level: Super 1000; Prize: $1,450,000; Format: 32MS/32WS/32MD/32WD/32XD	(South Korea) An Se-young	(China) Wang Zhiyi
7–12 January	Malaysia Open (Draw): Host: Kuala Lumpur, Malaysia; Venue: Axiata Arena; Level: Super 1000; Prize: $1,450,000; Format: 32MS/32WS/32MD/32WD/32XD	Score: 21–17, 21–7	
7–12 January	Malaysia Open (Draw): Host: Kuala Lumpur, Malaysia; Venue: Axiata Arena; Level: Super 1000; Prize: $1,450,000; Format: 32MS/32WS/32MD/32WD/32XD	(South Korea) Kim Won-ho (South Korea) Seo Seung-jae	(China) Chen Boyang (China) Liu Yi
7–12 January	Malaysia Open (Draw): Host: Kuala Lumpur, Malaysia; Venue: Axiata Arena; Level: Super 1000; Prize: $1,450,000; Format: 32MS/32WS/32MD/32WD/32XD	Score: 19–21, 21–12, 21–12	
7–12 January	Malaysia Open (Draw): Host: Kuala Lumpur, Malaysia; Venue: Axiata Arena; Level: Super 1000; Prize: $1,450,000; Format: 32MS/32WS/32MD/32WD/32XD	(Japan) Yuki Fukushima (Japan) Mayu Matsumoto	(China) Jia Yifan (China) Zhang Shuxian
7–12 January	Malaysia Open (Draw): Host: Kuala Lumpur, Malaysia; Venue: Axiata Arena; Level: Super 1000; Prize: $1,450,000; Format: 32MS/32WS/32MD/32WD/32XD	Score: 17–21, 21–15, 21–15	
7–12 January	Malaysia Open (Draw): Host: Kuala Lumpur, Malaysia; Venue: Axiata Arena; Level: Super 1000; Prize: $1,450,000; Format: 32MS/32WS/32MD/32WD/32XD	(Thailand) Dechapol Puavaranukroh (Thailand) Supissara Paewsampran	(China) Feng Yanzhe (China) Huang Dongping
7–12 January	Malaysia Open (Draw): Host: Kuala Lumpur, Malaysia; Venue: Axiata Arena; Level: Super 1000; Prize: $1,450,000; Format: 32MS/32WS/32MD/32WD/32XD	Score: 21–13, 19–21, 21–18	
14–19 January	India Open (Draw): Host: New Delhi, India; Venue: K. D. Jadhav Indoor Stadium; Level: Super 750; Prize: $950,000; Format: 32MS/32WS/32MD/32WD/32XD	(Denmark) Viktor Axelsen	(Hong Kong) Lee Cheuk Yiu
14–19 January	India Open (Draw): Host: New Delhi, India; Venue: K. D. Jadhav Indoor Stadium; Level: Super 750; Prize: $950,000; Format: 32MS/32WS/32MD/32WD/32XD	Score: 21–16, 21–8	
14–19 January	India Open (Draw): Host: New Delhi, India; Venue: K. D. Jadhav Indoor Stadium; Level: Super 750; Prize: $950,000; Format: 32MS/32WS/32MD/32WD/32XD	(South Korea) An Se-young	(Thailand) Pornpawee Chochuwong
14–19 January	India Open (Draw): Host: New Delhi, India; Venue: K. D. Jadhav Indoor Stadium; Level: Super 750; Prize: $950,000; Format: 32MS/32WS/32MD/32WD/32XD	Score: 21–12, 21–9	
14–19 January	India Open (Draw): Host: New Delhi, India; Venue: K. D. Jadhav Indoor Stadium; Level: Super 750; Prize: $950,000; Format: 32MS/32WS/32MD/32WD/32XD	(Malaysia) Goh Sze Fei (Malaysia) Nur Izzuddin	(South Korea) Kim Won-ho (South Korea) Seo Seung-jae
14–19 January	India Open (Draw): Host: New Delhi, India; Venue: K. D. Jadhav Indoor Stadium; Level: Super 750; Prize: $950,000; Format: 32MS/32WS/32MD/32WD/32XD	Score: 21–15, 13–21, 21–16	
14–19 January	India Open (Draw): Host: New Delhi, India; Venue: K. D. Jadhav Indoor Stadium; Level: Super 750; Prize: $950,000; Format: 32MS/32WS/32MD/32WD/32XD	(Japan) Arisa Igarashi (Japan) Ayako Sakuramoto	(South Korea) Kim Hye-jeong (South Korea) Kong Hee-yong
14–19 January	India Open (Draw): Host: New Delhi, India; Venue: K. D. Jadhav Indoor Stadium; Level: Super 750; Prize: $950,000; Format: 32MS/32WS/32MD/32WD/32XD	Score: 21–15, 21–13	
14–19 January	India Open (Draw): Host: New Delhi, India; Venue: K. D. Jadhav Indoor Stadium; Level: Super 750; Prize: $950,000; Format: 32MS/32WS/32MD/32WD/32XD	(China) Jiang Zhenbang (China) Wei Yaxin	(France) Thom Gicquel (France) Delphine Delrue
14–19 January	India Open (Draw): Host: New Delhi, India; Venue: K. D. Jadhav Indoor Stadium; Level: Super 750; Prize: $950,000; Format: 32MS/32WS/32MD/32WD/32XD	Score: 21–18, 21–17	
21–26 January	Indonesia Masters (Draw): Host: Jakarta, Indonesia; Venue: Istora Senayan; Level: Super 500; Prize: $475,000; Format: 32MS/32WS/32MD/32WD/32XD	(Thailand) Kunlavut Vitidsarn	(Indonesia) Jonatan Christie
21–26 January	Indonesia Masters (Draw): Host: Jakarta, Indonesia; Venue: Istora Senayan; Level: Super 500; Prize: $475,000; Format: 32MS/32WS/32MD/32WD/32XD	Score: 18–21, 21–17, 21–18	
21–26 January	Indonesia Masters (Draw): Host: Jakarta, Indonesia; Venue: Istora Senayan; Level: Super 500; Prize: $475,000; Format: 32MS/32WS/32MD/32WD/32XD	(Thailand) Ratchanok Intanon	(South Korea) Sim Yu-jin
21–26 January	Indonesia Masters (Draw): Host: Jakarta, Indonesia; Venue: Istora Senayan; Level: Super 500; Prize: $475,000; Format: 32MS/32WS/32MD/32WD/32XD	Score: 21–18, 21–17	
21–26 January	Indonesia Masters (Draw): Host: Jakarta, Indonesia; Venue: Istora Senayan; Level: Super 500; Prize: $475,000; Format: 32MS/32WS/32MD/32WD/32XD	(Malaysia) Man Wei Chong (Malaysia) Tee Kai Wun	(Indonesia) Fajar Alfian (Indonesia) Muhammad Rian Ardianto
21–26 January	Indonesia Masters (Draw): Host: Jakarta, Indonesia; Venue: Istora Senayan; Level: Super 500; Prize: $475,000; Format: 32MS/32WS/32MD/32WD/32XD	Score: 21–11, 21–19	
21–26 January	Indonesia Masters (Draw): Host: Jakarta, Indonesia; Venue: Istora Senayan; Level: Super 500; Prize: $475,000; Format: 32MS/32WS/32MD/32WD/32XD	(South Korea) Kim Hye-jeong (South Korea) Kong Hee-yong	(Malaysia) Pearly Tan (Malaysia) Thinaah Muralitharan
21–26 January	Indonesia Masters (Draw): Host: Jakarta, Indonesia; Venue: Istora Senayan; Level: Super 500; Prize: $475,000; Format: 32MS/32WS/32MD/32WD/32XD	Score: 21–12, 17–21, 21–18	
21–26 January	Indonesia Masters (Draw): Host: Jakarta, Indonesia; Venue: Istora Senayan; Level: Super 500; Prize: $475,000; Format: 32MS/32WS/32MD/32WD/32XD	(Japan) Hiroki Midorikawa (Japan) Natsu Saito	(China) Guo Xinwa (China) Chen Fanghui
21–26 January	Indonesia Masters (Draw): Host: Jakarta, Indonesia; Venue: Istora Senayan; Level: Super 500; Prize: $475,000; Format: 32MS/32WS/32MD/32WD/32XD	Score: 21–15, 21–17	
28 January – 2 February	Thailand Masters (Draw): Host: Bangkok, Thailand; Venue: Nimibutr Stadium; Level: Super 300; Prize: $240,000; Format: 32MS/32WS/32MD/32WD/32XD	(Singapore) Jason Teh	(China) Wang Zhengxing
28 January – 2 February	Thailand Masters (Draw): Host: Bangkok, Thailand; Venue: Nimibutr Stadium; Level: Super 300; Prize: $240,000; Format: 32MS/32WS/32MD/32WD/32XD	Score: 21–18, 15–21, 21–19	
28 January – 2 February	Thailand Masters (Draw): Host: Bangkok, Thailand; Venue: Nimibutr Stadium; Level: Super 300; Prize: $240,000; Format: 32MS/32WS/32MD/32WD/32XD	(Thailand) Pornpawee Chochuwong	(Indonesia) Komang Ayu Cahya Dewi
28 January – 2 February	Thailand Masters (Draw): Host: Bangkok, Thailand; Venue: Nimibutr Stadium; Level: Super 300; Prize: $240,000; Format: 32MS/32WS/32MD/32WD/32XD	Score: 18–21, 21–16, 21–13	
28 January – 2 February	Thailand Masters (Draw): Host: Bangkok, Thailand; Venue: Nimibutr Stadium; Level: Super 300; Prize: $240,000; Format: 32MS/32WS/32MD/32WD/32XD	(South Korea) Jin Yong (South Korea) Seo Seung-jae	(Indonesia) Muhammad Shohibul Fikri (Indonesia) Daniel Marthin
28 January – 2 February	Thailand Masters (Draw): Host: Bangkok, Thailand; Venue: Nimibutr Stadium; Level: Super 300; Prize: $240,000; Format: 32MS/32WS/32MD/32WD/32XD	Score: 21–18, 21–17	
28 January – 2 February	Thailand Masters (Draw): Host: Bangkok, Thailand; Venue: Nimibutr Stadium; Level: Super 300; Prize: $240,000; Format: 32MS/32WS/32MD/32WD/32XD	(Indonesia) Lanny Tria Mayasari (Indonesia) Siti Fadia Silva Ramadhanti	(Thailand) Laksika Kanlaha (Thailand) Phataimas Muenwong
28 January – 2 February	Thailand Masters (Draw): Host: Bangkok, Thailand; Venue: Nimibutr Stadium; Level: Super 300; Prize: $240,000; Format: 32MS/32WS/32MD/32WD/32XD	Score: 15–21, 21–13, 21–8	
28 January – 2 February	Thailand Masters (Draw): Host: Bangkok, Thailand; Venue: Nimibutr Stadium; Level: Super 300; Prize: $240,000; Format: 32MS/32WS/32MD/32WD/32XD	(Thailand) Dechapol Puavaranukroh (Thailand) Supissara Paewsampran	(Indonesia) Dejan Ferdinansyah (Indonesia) Siti Fadia Silva Ramadhanti
28 January – 2 February	Thailand Masters (Draw): Host: Bangkok, Thailand; Venue: Nimibutr Stadium; Level: Super 300; Prize: $240,000; Format: 32MS/32WS/32MD/32WD/32XD	Score: 19–21, 21–17, 21–13	

=== February ===
Date	Tournament	Champions	Runners-up
25 February – 2 March	German Open (Draw): Host: Mülheim, Germany; Venue: Westenergie Sporthalle; Level: Super 300; Prize: $240,000; Format: 32MS/32WS/32MD/32WD/32XD	(Denmark) Viktor Axelsen	(Singapore) Loh Kean Yew
25 February – 2 March	German Open (Draw): Host: Mülheim, Germany; Venue: Westenergie Sporthalle; Level: Super 300; Prize: $240,000; Format: 32MS/32WS/32MD/32WD/32XD	Score: 21–19, 21–18	
25 February – 2 March	German Open (Draw): Host: Mülheim, Germany; Venue: Westenergie Sporthalle; Level: Super 300; Prize: $240,000; Format: 32MS/32WS/32MD/32WD/32XD	(Singapore) Yeo Jia Min	(Vietnam) Nguyễn Thùy Linh
25 February – 2 March	German Open (Draw): Host: Mülheim, Germany; Venue: Westenergie Sporthalle; Level: Super 300; Prize: $240,000; Format: 32MS/32WS/32MD/32WD/32XD	Score: 21–16, 21–17	
25 February – 2 March	German Open (Draw): Host: Mülheim, Germany; Venue: Westenergie Sporthalle; Level: Super 300; Prize: $240,000; Format: 32MS/32WS/32MD/32WD/32XD	(South Korea) Kim Won-ho (South Korea) Seo Seung-jae	(France) Christo Popov (France) Toma Junior Popov
25 February – 2 March	German Open (Draw): Host: Mülheim, Germany; Venue: Westenergie Sporthalle; Level: Super 300; Prize: $240,000; Format: 32MS/32WS/32MD/32WD/32XD	Score: 21–19, 21–17	
25 February – 2 March	German Open (Draw): Host: Mülheim, Germany; Venue: Westenergie Sporthalle; Level: Super 300; Prize: $240,000; Format: 32MS/32WS/32MD/32WD/32XD	(Japan) Mizuki Otake (Japan) Miyu Takahashi	(Bulgaria) Gabriela Stoeva (Bulgaria) Stefani Stoeva
25 February – 2 March	German Open (Draw): Host: Mülheim, Germany; Venue: Westenergie Sporthalle; Level: Super 300; Prize: $240,000; Format: 32MS/32WS/32MD/32WD/32XD	Score: 21–17, 20–22, 21–12	
25 February – 2 March	German Open (Draw): Host: Mülheim, Germany; Venue: Westenergie Sporthalle; Level: Super 300; Prize: $240,000; Format: 32MS/32WS/32MD/32WD/32XD	(Netherlands) Robin Tabeling (Denmark) Alexandra Bøje	(Indonesia) Rehan Naufal Kusharjanto (Indonesia) Gloria Emanuelle Widjaja
25 February – 2 March	German Open (Draw): Host: Mülheim, Germany; Venue: Westenergie Sporthalle; Level: Super 300; Prize: $240,000; Format: 32MS/32WS/32MD/32WD/32XD	Score: 21–17, 21–12	

=== March ===
Date	Tournament	Champions	Runners-up
4–9 March	Orléans Masters (Draw): Host: Orléans, France; Venue: Palais des Sports; Level: Super 300; Prize: $240,000; Format: 32MS/32WS/32MD/32WD/32XD	(France) Alex Lanier	(Chinese Taipei) Lin Chun-yi
4–9 March	Orléans Masters (Draw): Host: Orléans, France; Venue: Palais des Sports; Level: Super 300; Prize: $240,000; Format: 32MS/32WS/32MD/32WD/32XD	Score: 21–13, 21–18	
4–9 March	Orléans Masters (Draw): Host: Orléans, France; Venue: Palais des Sports; Level: Super 300; Prize: $240,000; Format: 32MS/32WS/32MD/32WD/32XD	(South Korea) An Se-young	(China) Chen Yufei
4–9 March	Orléans Masters (Draw): Host: Orléans, France; Venue: Palais des Sports; Level: Super 300; Prize: $240,000; Format: 32MS/32WS/32MD/32WD/32XD	Score: 21–14, 21–15	
4–9 March	Orléans Masters (Draw): Host: Orléans, France; Venue: Palais des Sports; Level: Super 300; Prize: $240,000; Format: 32MS/32WS/32MD/32WD/32XD	(South Korea) Kang Min-hyuk (South Korea) Ki Dong-ju	(China) Liang Weikeng (China) Wang Chang
4–9 March	Orléans Masters (Draw): Host: Orléans, France; Venue: Palais des Sports; Level: Super 300; Prize: $240,000; Format: 32MS/32WS/32MD/32WD/32XD	Score: 21–13, 18–21, 21–18	
4–9 March	Orléans Masters (Draw): Host: Orléans, France; Venue: Palais des Sports; Level: Super 300; Prize: $240,000; Format: 32MS/32WS/32MD/32WD/32XD	(South Korea) Kim Hye-jeong (South Korea) Kong Hee-yong	(South Korea) Baek Ha-na (South Korea) Lee So-hee
4–9 March	Orléans Masters (Draw): Host: Orléans, France; Venue: Palais des Sports; Level: Super 300; Prize: $240,000; Format: 32MS/32WS/32MD/32WD/32XD	Score: 21–18, 23–21	
4–9 March	Orléans Masters (Draw): Host: Orléans, France; Venue: Palais des Sports; Level: Super 300; Prize: $240,000; Format: 32MS/32WS/32MD/32WD/32XD	(Denmark) Jesper Toft (Denmark) Amalie Magelund	(Indonesia) Rehan Naufal Kusharjanto (Indonesia) Gloria Emanuelle Widjaja
4–9 March	Orléans Masters (Draw): Host: Orléans, France; Venue: Palais des Sports; Level: Super 300; Prize: $240,000; Format: 32MS/32WS/32MD/32WD/32XD	Score: 21–17, 21–13	
11–16 March	All England Open (Draw): Host: Birmingham, England; Venue: Utilita Arena Birmingham; Level: Super 1000; Prize: $1,450,000; Format: 32MS/32WS/32MD/32WD/32XD	(China) Shi Yuqi	(Chinese Taipei) Lee Chia-hao
11–16 March	All England Open (Draw): Host: Birmingham, England; Venue: Utilita Arena Birmingham; Level: Super 1000; Prize: $1,450,000; Format: 32MS/32WS/32MD/32WD/32XD	Score: 21–17, 21–19	
11–16 March	All England Open (Draw): Host: Birmingham, England; Venue: Utilita Arena Birmingham; Level: Super 1000; Prize: $1,450,000; Format: 32MS/32WS/32MD/32WD/32XD	(South Korea) An Se-young	(China) Wang Zhiyi
11–16 March	All England Open (Draw): Host: Birmingham, England; Venue: Utilita Arena Birmingham; Level: Super 1000; Prize: $1,450,000; Format: 32MS/32WS/32MD/32WD/32XD	Score: 13–21, 21–18, 21–18	
11–16 March	All England Open (Draw): Host: Birmingham, England; Venue: Utilita Arena Birmingham; Level: Super 1000; Prize: $1,450,000; Format: 32MS/32WS/32MD/32WD/32XD	(South Korea) Kim Won-ho (South Korea) Seo Seung-jae	(Indonesia) Leo Rolly Carnando (Indonesia) Bagas Maulana
11–16 March	All England Open (Draw): Host: Birmingham, England; Venue: Utilita Arena Birmingham; Level: Super 1000; Prize: $1,450,000; Format: 32MS/32WS/32MD/32WD/32XD	Score: 21–19, 21–19	
11–16 March	All England Open (Draw): Host: Birmingham, England; Venue: Utilita Arena Birmingham; Level: Super 1000; Prize: $1,450,000; Format: 32MS/32WS/32MD/32WD/32XD	(Japan) Nami Matsuyama (Japan) Chiharu Shida	(Japan) Yuki Fukushima (Japan) Mayu Matsumoto
11–16 March	All England Open (Draw): Host: Birmingham, England; Venue: Utilita Arena Birmingham; Level: Super 1000; Prize: $1,450,000; Format: 32MS/32WS/32MD/32WD/32XD	Score: 21–16, 14–21, 21–17	
11–16 March	All England Open (Draw): Host: Birmingham, England; Venue: Utilita Arena Birmingham; Level: Super 1000; Prize: $1,450,000; Format: 32MS/32WS/32MD/32WD/32XD	(China) Guo Xinwa (China) Chen Fanghui	(China) Feng Yanzhe (China) Wei Yaxin
11–16 March	All England Open (Draw): Host: Birmingham, England; Venue: Utilita Arena Birmingham; Level: Super 1000; Prize: $1,450,000; Format: 32MS/32WS/32MD/32WD/32XD	Score: 21–16, 10–21, 23–21	
11–16 March	Ruichang China Masters (Draw): Host: Ruichang, China; Venue: Ruichang Sports Park Gymnasium; Level: Super 100; Prize: $120,000; Format: 48MS/32WS/32MD/32WD/32XD	(China) Sun Chao	(China) Zhou Xinyu
11–16 March	Ruichang China Masters (Draw): Host: Ruichang, China; Venue: Ruichang Sports Park Gymnasium; Level: Super 100; Prize: $120,000; Format: 48MS/32WS/32MD/32WD/32XD	Score: 21–15, 21–17	
11–16 March	Ruichang China Masters (Draw): Host: Ruichang, China; Venue: Ruichang Sports Park Gymnasium; Level: Super 100; Prize: $120,000; Format: 48MS/32WS/32MD/32WD/32XD	(China) Zhang Yiman	(China) Han Qianxi
11–16 March	Ruichang China Masters (Draw): Host: Ruichang, China; Venue: Ruichang Sports Park Gymnasium; Level: Super 100; Prize: $120,000; Format: 48MS/32WS/32MD/32WD/32XD	Score: 21–13, 21–14	
11–16 March	Ruichang China Masters (Draw): Host: Ruichang, China; Venue: Ruichang Sports Park Gymnasium; Level: Super 100; Prize: $120,000; Format: 48MS/32WS/32MD/32WD/32XD	(China) Chen Yongrui (China) Chen Zhehan	(China) Hu Keyuan (China) Lin Xiangyi
11–16 March	Ruichang China Masters (Draw): Host: Ruichang, China; Venue: Ruichang Sports Park Gymnasium; Level: Super 100; Prize: $120,000; Format: 48MS/32WS/32MD/32WD/32XD	Score: 23–21, 21–15	
11–16 March	Ruichang China Masters (Draw): Host: Ruichang, China; Venue: Ruichang Sports Park Gymnasium; Level: Super 100; Prize: $120,000; Format: 48MS/32WS/32MD/32WD/32XD	(China) Chen Xiaofei (China) Feng Xueying	(China) Qiao Shijun (China) Zheng Yu
11–16 March	Ruichang China Masters (Draw): Host: Ruichang, China; Venue: Ruichang Sports Park Gymnasium; Level: Super 100; Prize: $120,000; Format: 48MS/32WS/32MD/32WD/32XD	Score: 21–17, 21–12	
11–16 March	Ruichang China Masters (Draw): Host: Ruichang, China; Venue: Ruichang Sports Park Gymnasium; Level: Super 100; Prize: $120,000; Format: 48MS/32WS/32MD/32WD/32XD	(Hong Kong) Tang Chun Man (Hong Kong) Ng Tsz Yau	(China) Zhang Hanyu (China) Tang Ruizhi
11–16 March	Ruichang China Masters (Draw): Host: Ruichang, China; Venue: Ruichang Sports Park Gymnasium; Level: Super 100; Prize: $120,000; Format: 48MS/32WS/32MD/32WD/32XD	Score: 21–17, 18–21, 21–12	
18–23 March	Swiss Open (Draw): Host: Basel, Switzerland; Venue: St. Jakobshalle; Level: Super 300; Prize: $250,000; Format: 32MS/32WS/32MD/32WD/32XD	(China) Weng Hongyang	(France) Christo Popov
18–23 March	Swiss Open (Draw): Host: Basel, Switzerland; Venue: St. Jakobshalle; Level: Super 300; Prize: $250,000; Format: 32MS/32WS/32MD/32WD/32XD	Score: 21–18, 21–3	
18–23 March	Swiss Open (Draw): Host: Basel, Switzerland; Venue: St. Jakobshalle; Level: Super 300; Prize: $250,000; Format: 32MS/32WS/32MD/32WD/32XD	(China) Chen Yufei	(Denmark) Line Kjærsfeldt
18–23 March	Swiss Open (Draw): Host: Basel, Switzerland; Venue: St. Jakobshalle; Level: Super 300; Prize: $250,000; Format: 32MS/32WS/32MD/32WD/32XD	Score: 21–17, 21–17	
18–23 March	Swiss Open (Draw): Host: Basel, Switzerland; Venue: St. Jakobshalle; Level: Super 300; Prize: $250,000; Format: 32MS/32WS/32MD/32WD/32XD	(Thailand) Kittinupong Kedren (Thailand) Dechapol Puavaranukroh	(Indonesia) Muhammad Shohibul Fikri (Indonesia) Daniel Marthin
18–23 March	Swiss Open (Draw): Host: Basel, Switzerland; Venue: St. Jakobshalle; Level: Super 300; Prize: $250,000; Format: 32MS/32WS/32MD/32WD/32XD	Score: 21–15, 18–21, 21–14	
18–23 March	Swiss Open (Draw): Host: Basel, Switzerland; Venue: St. Jakobshalle; Level: Super 300; Prize: $250,000; Format: 32MS/32WS/32MD/32WD/32XD	(China) Jia Yifan (China) Zhang Shuxian	(China) Liu Shengshu (China) Tan Ning
18–23 March	Swiss Open (Draw): Host: Basel, Switzerland; Venue: St. Jakobshalle; Level: Super 300; Prize: $250,000; Format: 32MS/32WS/32MD/32WD/32XD	Score: 21–19, 14–21, 21–17	
18–23 March	Swiss Open (Draw): Host: Basel, Switzerland; Venue: St. Jakobshalle; Level: Super 300; Prize: $250,000; Format: 32MS/32WS/32MD/32WD/32XD	(China) Feng Yanzhe (China) Wei Yaxin	(China) Zhu Yijun (China) Zhang Chi
18–23 March	Swiss Open (Draw): Host: Basel, Switzerland; Venue: St. Jakobshalle; Level: Super 300; Prize: $250,000; Format: 32MS/32WS/32MD/32WD/32XD	Score: 21–13, 21–15	
25–30 March	Spain Masters (Draw) (cancelled): Host: Madrid, Spain; Venue: –; Level: Super 300; Prize: $250,000; Format: –		
25–30 March	Spain Masters (Draw) (cancelled): Host: Madrid, Spain; Venue: –; Level: Super 300; Prize: $250,000; Format: –	Score:	
25–30 March	Spain Masters (Draw) (cancelled): Host: Madrid, Spain; Venue: –; Level: Super 300; Prize: $250,000; Format: –	Score:	
25–30 March	Spain Masters (Draw) (cancelled): Host: Madrid, Spain; Venue: –; Level: Super 300; Prize: $250,000; Format: –	Score:	
25–30 March	Spain Masters (Draw) (cancelled): Host: Madrid, Spain; Venue: –; Level: Super 300; Prize: $250,000; Format: –	Score:	
25–30 March	Spain Masters (Draw) (cancelled): Host: Madrid, Spain; Venue: –; Level: Super 300; Prize: $250,000; Format: –	Score:	

=== April ===
No World Tour tournament held in April.

=== May ===
Date	Tournament	Champions	Runners-up
6–11 May	Taipei Open (Draw): Host: Taipei, Taiwan; Venue: Taipei Arena; Level: Super 300; Prize: $240,000; Format: 32MS/32WS/32MD/32WD/32XD	(Singapore) Loh Kean Yew	(Chinese Taipei) Chou Tien-chen
6–11 May	Taipei Open (Draw): Host: Taipei, Taiwan; Venue: Taipei Arena; Level: Super 300; Prize: $240,000; Format: 32MS/32WS/32MD/32WD/32XD	Score: 21–14, 15–21, 22–20	
6–11 May	Taipei Open (Draw): Host: Taipei, Taiwan; Venue: Taipei Arena; Level: Super 300; Prize: $240,000; Format: 32MS/32WS/32MD/32WD/32XD	(Japan) Tomoka Miyazaki	(Thailand) Pitchamon Opatniputh
6–11 May	Taipei Open (Draw): Host: Taipei, Taiwan; Venue: Taipei Arena; Level: Super 300; Prize: $240,000; Format: 32MS/32WS/32MD/32WD/32XD	Score: 21–12, 20–22, 21–14	
6–11 May	Taipei Open (Draw): Host: Taipei, Taiwan; Venue: Taipei Arena; Level: Super 300; Prize: $240,000; Format: 32MS/32WS/32MD/32WD/32XD	(Chinese Taipei) Chiu Hsiang-chieh (Chinese Taipei) Wang Chi-lin	(South Korea) Kang Min-hyuk (South Korea) Ki Dong-ju
6–11 May	Taipei Open (Draw): Host: Taipei, Taiwan; Venue: Taipei Arena; Level: Super 300; Prize: $240,000; Format: 32MS/32WS/32MD/32WD/32XD	Score: 21–18, 21–15	
6–11 May	Taipei Open (Draw): Host: Taipei, Taiwan; Venue: Taipei Arena; Level: Super 300; Prize: $240,000; Format: 32MS/32WS/32MD/32WD/32XD	(Chinese Taipei) Hsieh Pei-shan (Chinese Taipei) Hung En-tzu	(Japan) Mizuki Otake (Japan) Miyu Takahashi
6–11 May	Taipei Open (Draw): Host: Taipei, Taiwan; Venue: Taipei Arena; Level: Super 300; Prize: $240,000; Format: 32MS/32WS/32MD/32WD/32XD	Score: 21–14, 21–15	
6–11 May	Taipei Open (Draw): Host: Taipei, Taiwan; Venue: Taipei Arena; Level: Super 300; Prize: $240,000; Format: 32MS/32WS/32MD/32WD/32XD	(Indonesia) Jafar Hidayatullah (Indonesia) Felisha Pasaribu	(Indonesia) Dejan Ferdinansyah (Indonesia) Siti Fadia Silva Ramadhanti
6–11 May	Taipei Open (Draw): Host: Taipei, Taiwan; Venue: Taipei Arena; Level: Super 300; Prize: $240,000; Format: 32MS/32WS/32MD/32WD/32XD	Score: 18–21, 21–13, 21–17	
13–18 May	Thailand Open (Draw): Host: Bangkok, Thailand; Venue: Nimibutr Stadium; Level: Super 500; Prize: $475,000; Format: 32MS/32WS/32MD/32WD/32XD	(Thailand) Kunlavut Vitidsarn	(Denmark) Anders Antonsen
13–18 May	Thailand Open (Draw): Host: Bangkok, Thailand; Venue: Nimibutr Stadium; Level: Super 500; Prize: $475,000; Format: 32MS/32WS/32MD/32WD/32XD	Score: 21–16, 17–21, 21–9	
13–18 May	Thailand Open (Draw): Host: Bangkok, Thailand; Venue: Nimibutr Stadium; Level: Super 500; Prize: $475,000; Format: 32MS/32WS/32MD/32WD/32XD	(China) Chen Yufei	(Thailand) Pornpawee Chochuwong
13–18 May	Thailand Open (Draw): Host: Bangkok, Thailand; Venue: Nimibutr Stadium; Level: Super 500; Prize: $475,000; Format: 32MS/32WS/32MD/32WD/32XD	Score: 21–16, 21–12	
13–18 May	Thailand Open (Draw): Host: Bangkok, Thailand; Venue: Nimibutr Stadium; Level: Super 500; Prize: $475,000; Format: 32MS/32WS/32MD/32WD/32XD	(Malaysia) Aaron Chia (Malaysia) Soh Wooi Yik	(Denmark) William Kryger Boe (Denmark) Christian Faust Kjær
13–18 May	Thailand Open (Draw): Host: Bangkok, Thailand; Venue: Nimibutr Stadium; Level: Super 500; Prize: $475,000; Format: 32MS/32WS/32MD/32WD/32XD	Score: 20–22, 21–17, 21–12	
13–18 May	Thailand Open (Draw): Host: Bangkok, Thailand; Venue: Nimibutr Stadium; Level: Super 500; Prize: $475,000; Format: 32MS/32WS/32MD/32WD/32XD	(Malaysia) Pearly Tan (Malaysia) Thinaah Muralitharan	(South Korea) Jeong Na-eun (South Korea) Lee Yeon-woo
13–18 May	Thailand Open (Draw): Host: Bangkok, Thailand; Venue: Nimibutr Stadium; Level: Super 500; Prize: $475,000; Format: 32MS/32WS/32MD/32WD/32XD	Score: 21–16, 21–17	
13–18 May	Thailand Open (Draw): Host: Bangkok, Thailand; Venue: Nimibutr Stadium; Level: Super 500; Prize: $475,000; Format: 32MS/32WS/32MD/32WD/32XD	(China) Feng Yanzhe (China) Huang Dongping	(China) Gao Jiaxuan (China) Wu Mengying
13–18 May	Thailand Open (Draw): Host: Bangkok, Thailand; Venue: Nimibutr Stadium; Level: Super 500; Prize: $475,000; Format: 32MS/32WS/32MD/32WD/32XD	Score: 24–22, 21–16	
20–25 May	Malaysia Masters (Draw): Host: Kuala Lumpur, Malaysia; Venue: Axiata Arena; Level: Super 500; Prize: $475,000; Format: 32MS/32WS/32MD/32WD/32XD	(China) Li Shifeng	(India) Srikanth Kidambi
20–25 May	Malaysia Masters (Draw): Host: Kuala Lumpur, Malaysia; Venue: Axiata Arena; Level: Super 500; Prize: $475,000; Format: 32MS/32WS/32MD/32WD/32XD	Score: 21–11, 21–9	
20–25 May	Malaysia Masters (Draw): Host: Kuala Lumpur, Malaysia; Venue: Axiata Arena; Level: Super 500; Prize: $475,000; Format: 32MS/32WS/32MD/32WD/32XD	(China) Wang Zhiyi	(China) Han Yue
20–25 May	Malaysia Masters (Draw): Host: Kuala Lumpur, Malaysia; Venue: Axiata Arena; Level: Super 500; Prize: $475,000; Format: 32MS/32WS/32MD/32WD/32XD	Score: 13–21, 21–13, 21–18	
20–25 May	Malaysia Masters (Draw): Host: Kuala Lumpur, Malaysia; Venue: Axiata Arena; Level: Super 500; Prize: $475,000; Format: 32MS/32WS/32MD/32WD/32XD	(Malaysia) Man Wei Chong (Malaysia) Tee Kai Wun	(Malaysia) Aaron Chia (Malaysia) Soh Wooi Yik
20–25 May	Malaysia Masters (Draw): Host: Kuala Lumpur, Malaysia; Venue: Axiata Arena; Level: Super 500; Prize: $475,000; Format: 32MS/32WS/32MD/32WD/32XD	Score: 21–12, 15–21, 21–16	
20–25 May	Malaysia Masters (Draw): Host: Kuala Lumpur, Malaysia; Venue: Axiata Arena; Level: Super 500; Prize: $475,000; Format: 32MS/32WS/32MD/32WD/32XD	(China) Liu Shengshu (China) Tan Ning	(China) Jia Yifan (China) Zhang Shuxian
20–25 May	Malaysia Masters (Draw): Host: Kuala Lumpur, Malaysia; Venue: Axiata Arena; Level: Super 500; Prize: $475,000; Format: 32MS/32WS/32MD/32WD/32XD	Score: 21–17, 21–18	
20–25 May	Malaysia Masters (Draw): Host: Kuala Lumpur, Malaysia; Venue: Axiata Arena; Level: Super 500; Prize: $475,000; Format: 32MS/32WS/32MD/32WD/32XD	(China) Feng Yanzhe (China) Huang Dongping	(China) Jiang Zhenbang (China) Wei Yaxin
20–25 May	Malaysia Masters (Draw): Host: Kuala Lumpur, Malaysia; Venue: Axiata Arena; Level: Super 500; Prize: $475,000; Format: 32MS/32WS/32MD/32WD/32XD	Score: 21–17, 14–21, 21–16	
27 May – 1 June	Singapore Open (Draw): Host: Singapore; Venue: Singapore Indoor Stadium; Level: Super 750; Prize: $1,000,000; Format: 32MS/32WS/32MD/32WD/32XD	(Thailand) Kunlavut Vitidsarn	(China) Lu Guangzu
27 May – 1 June	Singapore Open (Draw): Host: Singapore; Venue: Singapore Indoor Stadium; Level: Super 750; Prize: $1,000,000; Format: 32MS/32WS/32MD/32WD/32XD	Score: 21–6, 21–10	
27 May – 1 June	Singapore Open (Draw): Host: Singapore; Venue: Singapore Indoor Stadium; Level: Super 750; Prize: $1,000,000; Format: 32MS/32WS/32MD/32WD/32XD	(China) Chen Yufei	(China) Wang Zhiyi
27 May – 1 June	Singapore Open (Draw): Host: Singapore; Venue: Singapore Indoor Stadium; Level: Super 750; Prize: $1,000,000; Format: 32MS/32WS/32MD/32WD/32XD	Score: 21–11, 21–11	
27 May – 1 June	Singapore Open (Draw): Host: Singapore; Venue: Singapore Indoor Stadium; Level: Super 750; Prize: $1,000,000; Format: 32MS/32WS/32MD/32WD/32XD	(Malaysia) Aaron Chia (Malaysia) Soh Wooi Yik	(South Korea) Kim Won-ho (South Korea) Seo Seung-jae
27 May – 1 June	Singapore Open (Draw): Host: Singapore; Venue: Singapore Indoor Stadium; Level: Super 750; Prize: $1,000,000; Format: 32MS/32WS/32MD/32WD/32XD	Score: 15–21, 21–18, 21–19	
27 May – 1 June	Singapore Open (Draw): Host: Singapore; Venue: Singapore Indoor Stadium; Level: Super 750; Prize: $1,000,000; Format: 32MS/32WS/32MD/32WD/32XD	(South Korea) Kim Hye-jeong (South Korea) Kong Hee-yong	(Japan) Rin Iwanaga (Japan) Kie Nakanishi
27 May – 1 June	Singapore Open (Draw): Host: Singapore; Venue: Singapore Indoor Stadium; Level: Super 750; Prize: $1,000,000; Format: 32MS/32WS/32MD/32WD/32XD	Score: 21–16, 21–14	
27 May – 1 June	Singapore Open (Draw): Host: Singapore; Venue: Singapore Indoor Stadium; Level: Super 750; Prize: $1,000,000; Format: 32MS/32WS/32MD/32WD/32XD	(Thailand) Dechapol Puavaranukroh (Thailand) Supissara Paewsampran	(Hong Kong) Tang Chun Man (Hong Kong) Tse Ying Suet
27 May – 1 June	Singapore Open (Draw): Host: Singapore; Venue: Singapore Indoor Stadium; Level: Super 750; Prize: $1,000,000; Format: 32MS/32WS/32MD/32WD/32XD	Score: 21–16, 21–9	

=== June ===
Date	Tournament	Champions	Runners-up
3–8 June	Indonesia Open (Draw): Host: Jakarta, Indonesia; Venue: Istora Senayan; Level: Super 1000; Prize: $1,450,000; Format: 32MS/32WS/32MD/32WD/32XD	(Denmark) Anders Antonsen	(Chinese Taipei) Chou Tien-chen
3–8 June	Indonesia Open (Draw): Host: Jakarta, Indonesia; Venue: Istora Senayan; Level: Super 1000; Prize: $1,450,000; Format: 32MS/32WS/32MD/32WD/32XD	Score: 22–20, 21–14	
3–8 June	Indonesia Open (Draw): Host: Jakarta, Indonesia; Venue: Istora Senayan; Level: Super 1000; Prize: $1,450,000; Format: 32MS/32WS/32MD/32WD/32XD	(South Korea) An Se-young	(China) Wang Zhiyi
3–8 June	Indonesia Open (Draw): Host: Jakarta, Indonesia; Venue: Istora Senayan; Level: Super 1000; Prize: $1,450,000; Format: 32MS/32WS/32MD/32WD/32XD	Score: 13–21, 21–19, 21–15	
3–8 June	Indonesia Open (Draw): Host: Jakarta, Indonesia; Venue: Istora Senayan; Level: Super 1000; Prize: $1,450,000; Format: 32MS/32WS/32MD/32WD/32XD	(South Korea) Kim Won-ho (South Korea) Seo Seung-jae	(Indonesia) Sabar Karyaman Gutama (Indonesia) Muhammad Reza Pahlevi Isfahani
3–8 June	Indonesia Open (Draw): Host: Jakarta, Indonesia; Venue: Istora Senayan; Level: Super 1000; Prize: $1,450,000; Format: 32MS/32WS/32MD/32WD/32XD	Score: 18–21, 21–19, 21–12	
3–8 June	Indonesia Open (Draw): Host: Jakarta, Indonesia; Venue: Istora Senayan; Level: Super 1000; Prize: $1,450,000; Format: 32MS/32WS/32MD/32WD/32XD	(China) Liu Shengshu (China) Tan Ning	(Malaysia) Pearly Tan (Malaysia) Thinaah Muralitharan
3–8 June	Indonesia Open (Draw): Host: Jakarta, Indonesia; Venue: Istora Senayan; Level: Super 1000; Prize: $1,450,000; Format: 32MS/32WS/32MD/32WD/32XD	Score: 23–25, 21–12, 21–19	
3–8 June	Indonesia Open (Draw): Host: Jakarta, Indonesia; Venue: Istora Senayan; Level: Super 1000; Prize: $1,450,000; Format: 32MS/32WS/32MD/32WD/32XD	(France) Thom Gicquel (France) Delphine Delrue	(Thailand) Dechapol Puavaranukroh (Thailand) Supissara Paewsampran
3–8 June	Indonesia Open (Draw): Host: Jakarta, Indonesia; Venue: Istora Senayan; Level: Super 1000; Prize: $1,450,000; Format: 32MS/32WS/32MD/32WD/32XD	Score: 21–16, 21–18	
24–29 June	U.S. Open (Draw): Host: Council Bluffs, United States; Venue: Mid-America Center; Level: Super 300; Prize: $240,000; Format: 32MS/32WS/32MD/32WD/32XD	(India) Ayush Shetty	(Canada) Brian Yang
24–29 June	U.S. Open (Draw): Host: Council Bluffs, United States; Venue: Mid-America Center; Level: Super 300; Prize: $240,000; Format: 32MS/32WS/32MD/32WD/32XD	Score: 21–18, 21–13	
24–29 June	U.S. Open (Draw): Host: Council Bluffs, United States; Venue: Mid-America Center; Level: Super 300; Prize: $240,000; Format: 32MS/32WS/32MD/32WD/32XD	(United States) Beiwen Zhang	(India) Tanvi Sharma
24–29 June	U.S. Open (Draw): Host: Council Bluffs, United States; Venue: Mid-America Center; Level: Super 300; Prize: $240,000; Format: 32MS/32WS/32MD/32WD/32XD	Score: 21–11, 16–21, 21–10	
24–29 June	U.S. Open (Draw): Host: Council Bluffs, United States; Venue: Mid-America Center; Level: Super 300; Prize: $240,000; Format: 32MS/32WS/32MD/32WD/32XD	(Chinese Taipei) Lai Po-yu (Chinese Taipei) Tsai Fu-cheng	(Chinese Taipei) He Zhi-wei (Chinese Taipei) Huang Jui-hsuan
24–29 June	U.S. Open (Draw): Host: Council Bluffs, United States; Venue: Mid-America Center; Level: Super 300; Prize: $240,000; Format: 32MS/32WS/32MD/32WD/32XD	Score: 21–13, 21–23, 21–15	
24–29 June	U.S. Open (Draw): Host: Council Bluffs, United States; Venue: Mid-America Center; Level: Super 300; Prize: $240,000; Format: 32MS/32WS/32MD/32WD/32XD	(Thailand) Benyapa Aimsaard (Thailand) Nuntakarn Aimsaard	(Chinese Taipei) Hsu Ya-ching (Chinese Taipei) Sung Yu-hsuan
24–29 June	U.S. Open (Draw): Host: Council Bluffs, United States; Venue: Mid-America Center; Level: Super 300; Prize: $240,000; Format: 32MS/32WS/32MD/32WD/32XD	Score: 21–15, 21–15	
24–29 June	U.S. Open (Draw): Host: Council Bluffs, United States; Venue: Mid-America Center; Level: Super 300; Prize: $240,000; Format: 32MS/32WS/32MD/32WD/32XD	(Denmark) Rasmus Espersen (Denmark) Amalie Cecilie Kudsk	(Thailand) Ruttanapak Oupthong (Thailand) Jhenicha Sudjaipraparat
24–29 June	U.S. Open (Draw): Host: Council Bluffs, United States; Venue: Mid-America Center; Level: Super 300; Prize: $240,000; Format: 32MS/32WS/32MD/32WD/32XD	Score: 21–17, 13–21, 21–10	

=== July ===
Date	Tournament	Champions	Runners-up
1–6 July	Canada Open (Draw): Host: Markham, Canada; Venue: Markham Pan Am Centre; Level: Super 300; Prize: $240,000; Format: 32MS/32WS/32MD/32WD/32XD	(Japan) Kenta Nishimoto	(Canada) Victor Lai
1–6 July	Canada Open (Draw): Host: Markham, Canada; Venue: Markham Pan Am Centre; Level: Super 300; Prize: $240,000; Format: 32MS/32WS/32MD/32WD/32XD	Score: 21–13, 21–14	
1–6 July	Canada Open (Draw): Host: Markham, Canada; Venue: Markham Pan Am Centre; Level: Super 300; Prize: $240,000; Format: 32MS/32WS/32MD/32WD/32XD	(Japan) Manami Suizu	(Vietnam) Nguyễn Thùy Linh
1–6 July	Canada Open (Draw): Host: Markham, Canada; Venue: Markham Pan Am Centre; Level: Super 300; Prize: $240,000; Format: 32MS/32WS/32MD/32WD/32XD	Score: 21–12, 21–14	
1–6 July	Canada Open (Draw): Host: Markham, Canada; Venue: Markham Pan Am Centre; Level: Super 300; Prize: $240,000; Format: 32MS/32WS/32MD/32WD/32XD	(Chinese Taipei) Lee Fang-chih (Chinese Taipei) Lee Fang-jen	(Chinese Taipei) Chang Ko-chi (Chinese Taipei) Po Li-wei
1–6 July	Canada Open (Draw): Host: Markham, Canada; Venue: Markham Pan Am Centre; Level: Super 300; Prize: $240,000; Format: 32MS/32WS/32MD/32WD/32XD	Score: 21–19, 21–19	
1–6 July	Canada Open (Draw): Host: Markham, Canada; Venue: Markham Pan Am Centre; Level: Super 300; Prize: $240,000; Format: 32MS/32WS/32MD/32WD/32XD	(Thailand) Benyapa Aimsaard (Thailand) Nuntakarn Aimsaard	(Japan) Kaho Osawa (Japan) Mai Tanabe
1–6 July	Canada Open (Draw): Host: Markham, Canada; Venue: Markham Pan Am Centre; Level: Super 300; Prize: $240,000; Format: 32MS/32WS/32MD/32WD/32XD	Score: 21–12, 21–18	
1–6 July	Canada Open (Draw): Host: Markham, Canada; Venue: Markham Pan Am Centre; Level: Super 300; Prize: $240,000; Format: 32MS/32WS/32MD/32WD/32XD	(Thailand) Ruttanapak Oupthong (Thailand) Jhenicha Sudjaipraparat	(United States) Presley Smith (United States) Jennie Gai
1–6 July	Canada Open (Draw): Host: Markham, Canada; Venue: Markham Pan Am Centre; Level: Super 300; Prize: $240,000; Format: 32MS/32WS/32MD/32WD/32XD	Score: 21–14, 21–17	
15–20 July	Japan Open (Draw): Host: Tokyo, Japan; Venue: Tokyo Metropolitan Gymnasium; Level: Super 750; Prize: $1,000,000; Format: 32MS/32WS/32MD/32WD/32XD	(China) Shi Yuqi	(France) Alex Lanier
15–20 July	Japan Open (Draw): Host: Tokyo, Japan; Venue: Tokyo Metropolitan Gymnasium; Level: Super 750; Prize: $1,000,000; Format: 32MS/32WS/32MD/32WD/32XD	Score: 21–17, 21–15	
15–20 July	Japan Open (Draw): Host: Tokyo, Japan; Venue: Tokyo Metropolitan Gymnasium; Level: Super 750; Prize: $1,000,000; Format: 32MS/32WS/32MD/32WD/32XD	(South Korea) An Se-young	(China) Wang Zhiyi
15–20 July	Japan Open (Draw): Host: Tokyo, Japan; Venue: Tokyo Metropolitan Gymnasium; Level: Super 750; Prize: $1,000,000; Format: 32MS/32WS/32MD/32WD/32XD	Score: 21–12, 21–10	
15–20 July	Japan Open (Draw): Host: Tokyo, Japan; Venue: Tokyo Metropolitan Gymnasium; Level: Super 750; Prize: $1,000,000; Format: 32MS/32WS/32MD/32WD/32XD	(South Korea) Kim Won-ho (South Korea) Seo Seung-jae	(Malaysia) Goh Sze Fei (Malaysia) Nur Izzuddin
15–20 July	Japan Open (Draw): Host: Tokyo, Japan; Venue: Tokyo Metropolitan Gymnasium; Level: Super 750; Prize: $1,000,000; Format: 32MS/32WS/32MD/32WD/32XD	Score: 21–16, 21–17	
15–20 July	Japan Open (Draw): Host: Tokyo, Japan; Venue: Tokyo Metropolitan Gymnasium; Level: Super 750; Prize: $1,000,000; Format: 32MS/32WS/32MD/32WD/32XD	(China) Liu Shengshu (China) Tan Ning	(Malaysia) Pearly Tan (Malaysia) Thinaah Muralitharan
15–20 July	Japan Open (Draw): Host: Tokyo, Japan; Venue: Tokyo Metropolitan Gymnasium; Level: Super 750; Prize: $1,000,000; Format: 32MS/32WS/32MD/32WD/32XD	Score: 21–15, 21–14	
15–20 July	Japan Open (Draw): Host: Tokyo, Japan; Venue: Tokyo Metropolitan Gymnasium; Level: Super 750; Prize: $1,000,000; Format: 32MS/32WS/32MD/32WD/32XD	(China) Jiang Zhenbang (China) Wei Yaxin	(Thailand) Dechapol Puavaranukroh (Thailand) Supissara Paewsampran
15–20 July	Japan Open (Draw): Host: Tokyo, Japan; Venue: Tokyo Metropolitan Gymnasium; Level: Super 750; Prize: $1,000,000; Format: 32MS/32WS/32MD/32WD/32XD	Score: 21–19, 16–21, 21–15	
22–27 July	China Open (Draw): Host: Changzhou, Jiangsu, China; Venue: Changzhou Olympic Sports Centre; Level: Super 1000; Prize: $1,450,000; Format: 32MS/32WS/32MD/32WD/32XD	(China) Shi Yuqi	(China) Wang Zhengxing
22–27 July	China Open (Draw): Host: Changzhou, Jiangsu, China; Venue: Changzhou Olympic Sports Centre; Level: Super 1000; Prize: $1,450,000; Format: 32MS/32WS/32MD/32WD/32XD	Score: 14–21, 21–14, 21–15	
22–27 July	China Open (Draw): Host: Changzhou, Jiangsu, China; Venue: Changzhou Olympic Sports Centre; Level: Super 1000; Prize: $1,450,000; Format: 32MS/32WS/32MD/32WD/32XD	(China) Wang Zhiyi	(China) Han Yue
22–27 July	China Open (Draw): Host: Changzhou, Jiangsu, China; Venue: Changzhou Olympic Sports Centre; Level: Super 1000; Prize: $1,450,000; Format: 32MS/32WS/32MD/32WD/32XD	Score: 21–8, 21–13	
22–27 July	China Open (Draw): Host: Changzhou, Jiangsu, China; Venue: Changzhou Olympic Sports Centre; Level: Super 1000; Prize: $1,450,000; Format: 32MS/32WS/32MD/32WD/32XD	(Indonesia) Fajar Alfian (Indonesia) Muhammad Shohibul Fikri	(Malaysia) Aaron Chia (Malaysia) Soh Wooi Yik
22–27 July	China Open (Draw): Host: Changzhou, Jiangsu, China; Venue: Changzhou Olympic Sports Centre; Level: Super 1000; Prize: $1,450,000; Format: 32MS/32WS/32MD/32WD/32XD	Score: 21–15, 21–14	
22–27 July	China Open (Draw): Host: Changzhou, Jiangsu, China; Venue: Changzhou Olympic Sports Centre; Level: Super 1000; Prize: $1,450,000; Format: 32MS/32WS/32MD/32WD/32XD	(China) Liu Shengshu (China) Tan Ning	(China) Jia Yifan (China) Zhang Shuxian
22–27 July	China Open (Draw): Host: Changzhou, Jiangsu, China; Venue: Changzhou Olympic Sports Centre; Level: Super 1000; Prize: $1,450,000; Format: 32MS/32WS/32MD/32WD/32XD	Score: 24–22, 17–21, 21–14	
22–27 July	China Open (Draw): Host: Changzhou, Jiangsu, China; Venue: Changzhou Olympic Sports Centre; Level: Super 1000; Prize: $1,450,000; Format: 32MS/32WS/32MD/32WD/32XD	(China) Feng Yanzhe (China) Huang Dongping	(China) Jiang Zhenbang (China) Wei Yaxin
22–27 July	China Open (Draw): Host: Changzhou, Jiangsu, China; Venue: Changzhou Olympic Sports Centre; Level: Super 1000; Prize: $1,450,000; Format: 32MS/32WS/32MD/32WD/32XD	Score: 23–21, 21–17	
29 July – 3 August	Macau Open (Draw): Host: Macau, China; Venue: Macau East Asian Games Dome; Level: Super 300; Prize: $240,000; Format: 32MS/32WS/32MD/32WD/32XD	(Indonesia) Alwi Farhan	(Malaysia) Justin Hoh
29 July – 3 August	Macau Open (Draw): Host: Macau, China; Venue: Macau East Asian Games Dome; Level: Super 300; Prize: $240,000; Format: 32MS/32WS/32MD/32WD/32XD	Score: 21–15, 21–5	
29 July – 3 August	Macau Open (Draw): Host: Macau, China; Venue: Macau East Asian Games Dome; Level: Super 300; Prize: $240,000; Format: 32MS/32WS/32MD/32WD/32XD	(China) Chen Yufei	(Denmark) Line Christophersen
29 July – 3 August	Macau Open (Draw): Host: Macau, China; Venue: Macau East Asian Games Dome; Level: Super 300; Prize: $240,000; Format: 32MS/32WS/32MD/32WD/32XD	Score: 21–17, 21–17	
29 July – 3 August	Macau Open (Draw): Host: Macau, China; Venue: Macau East Asian Games Dome; Level: Super 300; Prize: $240,000; Format: 32MS/32WS/32MD/32WD/32XD	(Malaysia) Junaidi Arif (Malaysia) Yap Roy King	(Indonesia) Sabar Karyaman Gutama (Indonesia) Muhammad Reza Pahlevi Isfahani
29 July – 3 August	Macau Open (Draw): Host: Macau, China; Venue: Macau East Asian Games Dome; Level: Super 300; Prize: $240,000; Format: 32MS/32WS/32MD/32WD/32XD	Score: 22–20, 21–18	
29 July – 3 August	Macau Open (Draw): Host: Macau, China; Venue: Macau East Asian Games Dome; Level: Super 300; Prize: $240,000; Format: 32MS/32WS/32MD/32WD/32XD	(Chinese Taipei) Hsieh Pei-shan (Chinese Taipei) Hung En-tzu	(Japan) Kaho Osawa (Japan) Mai Tanabe
29 July – 3 August	Macau Open (Draw): Host: Macau, China; Venue: Macau East Asian Games Dome; Level: Super 300; Prize: $240,000; Format: 32MS/32WS/32MD/32WD/32XD	Score: 21–18, 21–12	
29 July – 3 August	Macau Open (Draw): Host: Macau, China; Venue: Macau East Asian Games Dome; Level: Super 300; Prize: $240,000; Format: 32MS/32WS/32MD/32WD/32XD	(Denmark) Mathias Christiansen (Denmark) Alexandra Bøje	(Malaysia) Jimmy Wong (Malaysia) Lai Pei Jing
29 July – 3 August	Macau Open (Draw): Host: Macau, China; Venue: Macau East Asian Games Dome; Level: Super 300; Prize: $240,000; Format: 32MS/32WS/32MD/32WD/32XD	Score: 21–13, 21–16	

=== August ===
No World Tour tournament held in August.

=== September ===
Date	Tournament	Champions	Runners-up
2–7 September	Baoji China Masters (Draw): Host: Baoji, Shaanxi, China; Venue: Baoji City Gymnasium; Level: Super 100; Prize: $110,000; Format: 48MS/32WS/32MD/32WD/32XD	(China) Sun Chao	(China) Hu Zhe'an
2–7 September	Baoji China Masters (Draw): Host: Baoji, Shaanxi, China; Venue: Baoji City Gymnasium; Level: Super 100; Prize: $110,000; Format: 48MS/32WS/32MD/32WD/32XD	Score: 22–20, 23–21	
2–7 September	Baoji China Masters (Draw): Host: Baoji, Shaanxi, China; Venue: Baoji City Gymnasium; Level: Super 100; Prize: $110,000; Format: 48MS/32WS/32MD/32WD/32XD	(Thailand) Pitchamon Opatniputh	(China) Zheng Xinyan
2–7 September	Baoji China Masters (Draw): Host: Baoji, Shaanxi, China; Venue: Baoji City Gymnasium; Level: Super 100; Prize: $110,000; Format: 48MS/32WS/32MD/32WD/32XD	Score: 21–16, 18–21, 21–7	
2–7 September	Baoji China Masters (Draw): Host: Baoji, Shaanxi, China; Venue: Baoji City Gymnasium; Level: Super 100; Prize: $110,000; Format: 48MS/32WS/32MD/32WD/32XD	(China) Hu Keyuan (China) Lin Xiangyi	(China) Deng Haoxuan (China) Xu Jiajun
2–7 September	Baoji China Masters (Draw): Host: Baoji, Shaanxi, China; Venue: Baoji City Gymnasium; Level: Super 100; Prize: $110,000; Format: 48MS/32WS/32MD/32WD/32XD	Score: 21–13, 21–17	
2–7 September	Baoji China Masters (Draw): Host: Baoji, Shaanxi, China; Venue: Baoji City Gymnasium; Level: Super 100; Prize: $110,000; Format: 48MS/32WS/32MD/32WD/32XD	(China) Luo Yi (China) Wang Tingge	(China) Qiao Shijun (China) Zheng Yu
2–7 September	Baoji China Masters (Draw): Host: Baoji, Shaanxi, China; Venue: Baoji City Gymnasium; Level: Super 100; Prize: $110,000; Format: 48MS/32WS/32MD/32WD/32XD	Score: 17–21, 23–21, 21–15	
2–7 September	Baoji China Masters (Draw): Host: Baoji, Shaanxi, China; Venue: Baoji City Gymnasium; Level: Super 100; Prize: $110,000; Format: 48MS/32WS/32MD/32WD/32XD	(Thailand) Ruttanapak Oupthong (Thailand) Benyapa Aimsaard	(China) Zhu Yijun (China) Li Qian
2–7 September	Baoji China Masters (Draw): Host: Baoji, Shaanxi, China; Venue: Baoji City Gymnasium; Level: Super 100; Prize: $110,000; Format: 48MS/32WS/32MD/32WD/32XD	Score: 21–17, 21–16	
9–14 September	Hong Kong Open (Draw): Host: Hong Kong, China; Venue: Hong Kong Coliseum; Level: Super 500; Prize: $475,000; Format: 32MS/32WS/32MD/32WD/32XD	(China) Li Shifeng	(India) Lakshya Sen
9–14 September	Hong Kong Open (Draw): Host: Hong Kong, China; Venue: Hong Kong Coliseum; Level: Super 500; Prize: $475,000; Format: 32MS/32WS/32MD/32WD/32XD	Score: 21–15, 21–12	
9–14 September	Hong Kong Open (Draw): Host: Hong Kong, China; Venue: Hong Kong Coliseum; Level: Super 500; Prize: $475,000; Format: 32MS/32WS/32MD/32WD/32XD	(China) Wang Zhiyi	(China) Han Yue
9–14 September	Hong Kong Open (Draw): Host: Hong Kong, China; Venue: Hong Kong Coliseum; Level: Super 500; Prize: $475,000; Format: 32MS/32WS/32MD/32WD/32XD	Score: 21–14, 24–22	
9–14 September	Hong Kong Open (Draw): Host: Hong Kong, China; Venue: Hong Kong Coliseum; Level: Super 500; Prize: $475,000; Format: 32MS/32WS/32MD/32WD/32XD	(China) Liang Weikeng (China) Wang Chang	(India) Satwiksairaj Rankireddy (India) Chirag Shetty
9–14 September	Hong Kong Open (Draw): Host: Hong Kong, China; Venue: Hong Kong Coliseum; Level: Super 500; Prize: $475,000; Format: 32MS/32WS/32MD/32WD/32XD	Score: 19–21, 21–14, 21–17	
9–14 September	Hong Kong Open (Draw): Host: Hong Kong, China; Venue: Hong Kong Coliseum; Level: Super 500; Prize: $475,000; Format: 32MS/32WS/32MD/32WD/32XD	(China) Jia Yifan (China) Zhang Shuxian	(Japan) Rin Iwanaga (Japan) Kie Nakanishi
9–14 September	Hong Kong Open (Draw): Host: Hong Kong, China; Venue: Hong Kong Coliseum; Level: Super 500; Prize: $475,000; Format: 32MS/32WS/32MD/32WD/32XD	Score: 21–17, 21–15	
9–14 September	Hong Kong Open (Draw): Host: Hong Kong, China; Venue: Hong Kong Coliseum; Level: Super 500; Prize: $475,000; Format: 32MS/32WS/32MD/32WD/32XD	(China) Feng Yanzhe (China) Huang Dongping	(China) Guo Xinwa (China) Chen Fanghui
9–14 September	Hong Kong Open (Draw): Host: Hong Kong, China; Venue: Hong Kong Coliseum; Level: Super 500; Prize: $475,000; Format: 32MS/32WS/32MD/32WD/32XD	Score: 21–14, 21–14	
9–14 September	Vietnam Open (Draw): Host: Ho Chi Minh City, Vietnam; Venue: Nguyen Du Club; Level: Super 100; Prize: $110,000; Format: 48MS/32WS/32MD/32WD/32XD	(Thailand) Panitchaphon Teeraratsakul	(France) Arnaud Merklé
9–14 September	Vietnam Open (Draw): Host: Ho Chi Minh City, Vietnam; Venue: Nguyen Du Club; Level: Super 100; Prize: $110,000; Format: 48MS/32WS/32MD/32WD/32XD	Score: 21–16, 21–10	
9–14 September	Vietnam Open (Draw): Host: Ho Chi Minh City, Vietnam; Venue: Nguyen Du Club; Level: Super 100; Prize: $110,000; Format: 48MS/32WS/32MD/32WD/32XD	(China) Cai Yanyan	(Vietnam) Nguyễn Thùy Linh
9–14 September	Vietnam Open (Draw): Host: Ho Chi Minh City, Vietnam; Venue: Nguyen Du Club; Level: Super 100; Prize: $110,000; Format: 48MS/32WS/32MD/32WD/32XD	Score: 21–17, 23–21	
9–14 September	Vietnam Open (Draw): Host: Ho Chi Minh City, Vietnam; Venue: Nguyen Du Club; Level: Super 100; Prize: $110,000; Format: 48MS/32WS/32MD/32WD/32XD	(South Korea) Jin Yong (South Korea) Na Sung-seung	(China) Chen Xujun (China) Guo Ruohan
9–14 September	Vietnam Open (Draw): Host: Ho Chi Minh City, Vietnam; Venue: Nguyen Du Club; Level: Super 100; Prize: $110,000; Format: 48MS/32WS/32MD/32WD/32XD	Score: 21–10, 21–14	
9–14 September	Vietnam Open (Draw): Host: Ho Chi Minh City, Vietnam; Venue: Nguyen Du Club; Level: Super 100; Prize: $110,000; Format: 48MS/32WS/32MD/32WD/32XD	(China) Luo Yi (China) Wang Tingge	(China) Liu Jiayue (China) Wang Yiduo
9–14 September	Vietnam Open (Draw): Host: Ho Chi Minh City, Vietnam; Venue: Nguyen Du Club; Level: Super 100; Prize: $110,000; Format: 48MS/32WS/32MD/32WD/32XD	Score: 21–15, 21–17	
9–14 September	Vietnam Open (Draw): Host: Ho Chi Minh City, Vietnam; Venue: Nguyen Du Club; Level: Super 100; Prize: $110,000; Format: 48MS/32WS/32MD/32WD/32XD	(Indonesia) Marwan Faza (Indonesia) Aisyah Salsabila Putri Pranata	(China) Liao Pinyi (China) Tang Ruizhi
9–14 September	Vietnam Open (Draw): Host: Ho Chi Minh City, Vietnam; Venue: Nguyen Du Club; Level: Super 100; Prize: $110,000; Format: 48MS/32WS/32MD/32WD/32XD	Score: 21–16, 21–14	
16–21 September	China Masters (Draw): Host: Shenzhen, China; Venue: Shenzhen Bay Sports Center; Level: Super 750; Prize: $950,000; Format: 32MS/32WS/32MD/32WD/32XD	(China) Weng Hongyang	(Chinese Taipei) Lin Chun-yi
16–21 September	China Masters (Draw): Host: Shenzhen, China; Venue: Shenzhen Bay Sports Center; Level: Super 750; Prize: $950,000; Format: 32MS/32WS/32MD/32WD/32XD	Score: 21–11, 21–15	
16–21 September	China Masters (Draw): Host: Shenzhen, China; Venue: Shenzhen Bay Sports Center; Level: Super 750; Prize: $950,000; Format: 32MS/32WS/32MD/32WD/32XD	(South Korea) An Se-young	(China) Han Yue
16–21 September	China Masters (Draw): Host: Shenzhen, China; Venue: Shenzhen Bay Sports Center; Level: Super 750; Prize: $950,000; Format: 32MS/32WS/32MD/32WD/32XD	Score: 21–11, 21–3	
16–21 September	China Masters (Draw): Host: Shenzhen, China; Venue: Shenzhen Bay Sports Center; Level: Super 750; Prize: $950,000; Format: 32MS/32WS/32MD/32WD/32XD	(South Korea) Kim Won-ho (South Korea) Seo Seung-jae	(India) Satwiksairaj Rankireddy (India) Chirag Shetty
16–21 September	China Masters (Draw): Host: Shenzhen, China; Venue: Shenzhen Bay Sports Center; Level: Super 750; Prize: $950,000; Format: 32MS/32WS/32MD/32WD/32XD	Score: 21–19, 21–15	
16–21 September	China Masters (Draw): Host: Shenzhen, China; Venue: Shenzhen Bay Sports Center; Level: Super 750; Prize: $950,000; Format: 32MS/32WS/32MD/32WD/32XD	(China) Jia Yifan (China) Zhang Shuxian	(South Korea) Kim Hye-jeong (South Korea) Kong Hee-yong
16–21 September	China Masters (Draw): Host: Shenzhen, China; Venue: Shenzhen Bay Sports Center; Level: Super 750; Prize: $950,000; Format: 32MS/32WS/32MD/32WD/32XD	Score: 21–19, 16–21, 21–13	
16–21 September	China Masters (Draw): Host: Shenzhen, China; Venue: Shenzhen Bay Sports Center; Level: Super 750; Prize: $950,000; Format: 32MS/32WS/32MD/32WD/32XD	(Thailand) Dechapol Puavaranukroh (Thailand) Supissara Paewsampran	(Malaysia) Chen Tang Jie (Malaysia) Toh Ee Wei
16–21 September	China Masters (Draw): Host: Shenzhen, China; Venue: Shenzhen Bay Sports Center; Level: Super 750; Prize: $950,000; Format: 32MS/32WS/32MD/32WD/32XD	Score: 21–8, 21–17	
16–21 September	Indonesia Masters Super 100 I (Draw): Host: Pekanbaru, Indonesia; Venue: Gelanggang Remaja Pekanbaru; Level: Super 100; Prize: $110,000; Format: 48MS/32WS/32MD/32WD/32XD	(Indonesia) Chico Aura Dwi Wardoyo	(South Korea) Jeon Hyeok-jin
16–21 September	Indonesia Masters Super 100 I (Draw): Host: Pekanbaru, Indonesia; Venue: Gelanggang Remaja Pekanbaru; Level: Super 100; Prize: $110,000; Format: 48MS/32WS/32MD/32WD/32XD	Score: 13–21, 21–9, 21–17	
16–21 September	Indonesia Masters Super 100 I (Draw): Host: Pekanbaru, Indonesia; Venue: Gelanggang Remaja Pekanbaru; Level: Super 100; Prize: $110,000; Format: 48MS/32WS/32MD/32WD/32XD	(Chinese Taipei) Huang Yu-hsun	(Japan) Sakura Masuki
16–21 September	Indonesia Masters Super 100 I (Draw): Host: Pekanbaru, Indonesia; Venue: Gelanggang Remaja Pekanbaru; Level: Super 100; Prize: $110,000; Format: 48MS/32WS/32MD/32WD/32XD	Score: 16–21, 21–18, 21–13	
16–21 September	Indonesia Masters Super 100 I (Draw): Host: Pekanbaru, Indonesia; Venue: Gelanggang Remaja Pekanbaru; Level: Super 100; Prize: $110,000; Format: 48MS/32WS/32MD/32WD/32XD	(South Korea) Jin Yong (South Korea) Na Sung-seung	(Japan) Kakeru Kumagai (Japan) Hiroki Nishi
16–21 September	Indonesia Masters Super 100 I (Draw): Host: Pekanbaru, Indonesia; Venue: Gelanggang Remaja Pekanbaru; Level: Super 100; Prize: $110,000; Format: 48MS/32WS/32MD/32WD/32XD	Score: 21–19, 13–21, 21–13	
16–21 September	Indonesia Masters Super 100 I (Draw): Host: Pekanbaru, Indonesia; Venue: Gelanggang Remaja Pekanbaru; Level: Super 100; Prize: $110,000; Format: 48MS/32WS/32MD/32WD/32XD	(Chinese Taipei) Lin Xiao-min (Chinese Taipei) Wang Yu-qiao	(Japan) Ririna Hiramoto (Japan) Kokona Ishikawa
16–21 September	Indonesia Masters Super 100 I (Draw): Host: Pekanbaru, Indonesia; Venue: Gelanggang Remaja Pekanbaru; Level: Super 100; Prize: $110,000; Format: 48MS/32WS/32MD/32WD/32XD	Score: 21–17, 21–9	
16–21 September	Indonesia Masters Super 100 I (Draw): Host: Pekanbaru, Indonesia; Venue: Gelanggang Remaja Pekanbaru; Level: Super 100; Prize: $110,000; Format: 48MS/32WS/32MD/32WD/32XD	(Denmark) Mathias Christiansen (Denmark) Alexandra Bøje	(Malaysia) Jimmy Wong (Malaysia) Lai Pei Jing
16–21 September	Indonesia Masters Super 100 I (Draw): Host: Pekanbaru, Indonesia; Venue: Gelanggang Remaja Pekanbaru; Level: Super 100; Prize: $110,000; Format: 48MS/32WS/32MD/32WD/32XD	Score: 13–21, 23–21, 21–14	
23–28 September	Korea Open (Draw): Host: Suwon, South Korea; Venue: Suwon Gymnasium; Level: Super 500; Prize: $475,000; Format: 32MS/32WS/32MD/32WD/32XD	(Indonesia) Jonatan Christie	(Denmark) Anders Antonsen
23–28 September	Korea Open (Draw): Host: Suwon, South Korea; Venue: Suwon Gymnasium; Level: Super 500; Prize: $475,000; Format: 32MS/32WS/32MD/32WD/32XD	Score: 21–10, 15–21, 21–17	
23–28 September	Korea Open (Draw): Host: Suwon, South Korea; Venue: Suwon Gymnasium; Level: Super 500; Prize: $475,000; Format: 32MS/32WS/32MD/32WD/32XD	(Japan) Akane Yamaguchi	(South Korea) An Se-young
23–28 September	Korea Open (Draw): Host: Suwon, South Korea; Venue: Suwon Gymnasium; Level: Super 500; Prize: $475,000; Format: 32MS/32WS/32MD/32WD/32XD	Score: 21–18, 21–13	
23–28 September	Korea Open (Draw): Host: Suwon, South Korea; Venue: Suwon Gymnasium; Level: Super 500; Prize: $475,000; Format: 32MS/32WS/32MD/32WD/32XD	(South Korea) Kim Won-ho (South Korea) Seo Seung-jae	(Indonesia) Fajar Alfian (Indonesia) Muhammad Shohibul Fikri
23–28 September	Korea Open (Draw): Host: Suwon, South Korea; Venue: Suwon Gymnasium; Level: Super 500; Prize: $475,000; Format: 32MS/32WS/32MD/32WD/32XD	Score: 21–16, 23–21	
23–28 September	Korea Open (Draw): Host: Suwon, South Korea; Venue: Suwon Gymnasium; Level: Super 500; Prize: $475,000; Format: 32MS/32WS/32MD/32WD/32XD	(South Korea) Kim Hye-jeong (South Korea) Kong Hee-yong	(Japan) Rin Iwanaga (Japan) Kie Nakanishi
23–28 September	Korea Open (Draw): Host: Suwon, South Korea; Venue: Suwon Gymnasium; Level: Super 500; Prize: $475,000; Format: 32MS/32WS/32MD/32WD/32XD	Score: 21–19, 21–12	
23–28 September	Korea Open (Draw): Host: Suwon, South Korea; Venue: Suwon Gymnasium; Level: Super 500; Prize: $475,000; Format: 32MS/32WS/32MD/32WD/32XD	(China) Feng Yanzhe (China) Huang Dongping	(China) Jiang Zhenbang (China) Wei Yaxin
23–28 September	Korea Open (Draw): Host: Suwon, South Korea; Venue: Suwon Gymnasium; Level: Super 500; Prize: $475,000; Format: 32MS/32WS/32MD/32WD/32XD	Score: 25–23, 21–11	
23–28 September	Kaohsiung Masters (Draw): Host: Kaohsiung, Taiwan; Venue: Kaohsiung Arena; Level: Super 100; Prize: $110,000; Format: 48MS/32WS/32MD/32WD/32XD	(Chinese Taipei) Wang Po-wei	(Thailand) Panitchaphon Teeraratsakul
23–28 September	Kaohsiung Masters (Draw): Host: Kaohsiung, Taiwan; Venue: Kaohsiung Arena; Level: Super 100; Prize: $110,000; Format: 48MS/32WS/32MD/32WD/32XD	Score: 12–21, 21–18, 21–12	
23–28 September	Kaohsiung Masters (Draw): Host: Kaohsiung, Taiwan; Venue: Kaohsiung Arena; Level: Super 100; Prize: $110,000; Format: 48MS/32WS/32MD/32WD/32XD	(Japan) Nozomi Okuhara	(Japan) Hina Akechi
23–28 September	Kaohsiung Masters (Draw): Host: Kaohsiung, Taiwan; Venue: Kaohsiung Arena; Level: Super 100; Prize: $110,000; Format: 48MS/32WS/32MD/32WD/32XD	Score: 21–16, 21–17	
23–28 September	Kaohsiung Masters (Draw): Host: Kaohsiung, Taiwan; Venue: Kaohsiung Arena; Level: Super 100; Prize: $110,000; Format: 48MS/32WS/32MD/32WD/32XD	(Japan) Kakeru Kumagai (Japan) Hiroki Nishi	(Chinese Taipei) Su Ching-heng (Chinese Taipei) Wu Guan-xun
23–28 September	Kaohsiung Masters (Draw): Host: Kaohsiung, Taiwan; Venue: Kaohsiung Arena; Level: Super 100; Prize: $110,000; Format: 48MS/32WS/32MD/32WD/32XD	Score: 21–18, 21–17	
23–28 September	Kaohsiung Masters (Draw): Host: Kaohsiung, Taiwan; Venue: Kaohsiung Arena; Level: Super 100; Prize: $110,000; Format: 48MS/32WS/32MD/32WD/32XD	(Japan) Ririna Hiramoto (Japan) Kokona Ishikawa	(Japan) Hinata Suzuki (Japan) Nao Yamakita
23–28 September	Kaohsiung Masters (Draw): Host: Kaohsiung, Taiwan; Venue: Kaohsiung Arena; Level: Super 100; Prize: $110,000; Format: 48MS/32WS/32MD/32WD/32XD	Score: 21–16, 21–17	
23–28 September	Kaohsiung Masters (Draw): Host: Kaohsiung, Taiwan; Venue: Kaohsiung Arena; Level: Super 100; Prize: $110,000; Format: 48MS/32WS/32MD/32WD/32XD	(Japan) Akira Koga (Japan) Yuho Imai	(Chinese Taipei) Wu Hsuan-yi (Chinese Taipei) Yang Chu-yun
23–28 September	Kaohsiung Masters (Draw): Host: Kaohsiung, Taiwan; Venue: Kaohsiung Arena; Level: Super 100; Prize: $110,000; Format: 48MS/32WS/32MD/32WD/32XD	Score: 16–21, 21–13, 21–15	
30 September – 5 October	Al Ain Masters (Draw): Host: Al Ain, United Arab Emirates; Venue: Al Ain Club; Level: Super 100; Prize: $120,000; Format: 48MS/32WS/32MD/32WD/32XD	(Finland) Joakim Oldorff	(Malaysia) Aidil Sholeh
30 September – 5 October	Al Ain Masters (Draw): Host: Al Ain, United Arab Emirates; Venue: Al Ain Club; Level: Super 100; Prize: $120,000; Format: 48MS/32WS/32MD/32WD/32XD	Score: 14–21, 21–17, 21–7	
30 September – 5 October	Al Ain Masters (Draw): Host: Al Ain, United Arab Emirates; Venue: Al Ain Club; Level: Super 100; Prize: $120,000; Format: 48MS/32WS/32MD/32WD/32XD	(India) Shriyanshi Valishetty	(India) Tasnim Mir
30 September – 5 October	Al Ain Masters (Draw): Host: Al Ain, United Arab Emirates; Venue: Al Ain Club; Level: Super 100; Prize: $120,000; Format: 48MS/32WS/32MD/32WD/32XD	Score: 15–21, 22–20, 21–7	
30 September – 5 October	Al Ain Masters (Draw): Host: Al Ain, United Arab Emirates; Venue: Al Ain Club; Level: Super 100; Prize: $120,000; Format: 48MS/32WS/32MD/32WD/32XD	(India) Hariharan Amsakarunan (India) Arjun M. R.	(Indonesia) Raymond Indra (Indonesia) Nikolaus Joaquin
30 September – 5 October	Al Ain Masters (Draw): Host: Al Ain, United Arab Emirates; Venue: Al Ain Club; Level: Super 100; Prize: $120,000; Format: 48MS/32WS/32MD/32WD/32XD	Score: 21–17, 21–18	
30 September – 5 October	Al Ain Masters (Draw): Host: Al Ain, United Arab Emirates; Venue: Al Ain Club; Level: Super 100; Prize: $120,000; Format: 48MS/32WS/32MD/32WD/32XD	(Bulgaria) Gabriela Stoeva (Bulgaria) Stefani Stoeva	(Chinese Taipei) Chen Yan-fei (Chinese Taipei) Sun Liang-ching
30 September – 5 October	Al Ain Masters (Draw): Host: Al Ain, United Arab Emirates; Venue: Al Ain Club; Level: Super 100; Prize: $120,000; Format: 48MS/32WS/32MD/32WD/32XD	Score: 21–8, 21–13	
30 September – 5 October	Al Ain Masters (Draw): Host: Al Ain, United Arab Emirates; Venue: Al Ain Club; Level: Super 100; Prize: $120,000; Format: 48MS/32WS/32MD/32WD/32XD	(Indonesia) Dejan Ferdinansyah (Indonesia) Bernadine Wardana	(Indonesia) Marwan Faza (Indonesia) Aisyah Pranata
30 September – 5 October	Al Ain Masters (Draw): Host: Al Ain, United Arab Emirates; Venue: Al Ain Club; Level: Super 100; Prize: $120,000; Format: 48MS/32WS/32MD/32WD/32XD	Score: 21–12, 21–16	

=== October ===
Date	Tournament	Champions	Runners-up
7–12 October	Arctic Open (Draw): Host: Vantaa, Finland; Venue: Energia Areena; Level: Super 500; Prize: $475,000; Format: 32MS/32WS/32MD/32WD/32XD	(Chinese Taipei) Chou Tien-chen	(Thailand) Kunlavut Vitidsarn
7–12 October	Arctic Open (Draw): Host: Vantaa, Finland; Venue: Energia Areena; Level: Super 500; Prize: $475,000; Format: 32MS/32WS/32MD/32WD/32XD	Score: 21–11, 13–21, 21–19	
7–12 October	Arctic Open (Draw): Host: Vantaa, Finland; Venue: Energia Areena; Level: Super 500; Prize: $475,000; Format: 32MS/32WS/32MD/32WD/32XD	(Japan) Akane Yamaguchi	(Thailand) Busanan Ongbamrungphan
7–12 October	Arctic Open (Draw): Host: Vantaa, Finland; Venue: Energia Areena; Level: Super 500; Prize: $475,000; Format: 32MS/32WS/32MD/32WD/32XD	Score: 21–19, 21–16	
7–12 October	Arctic Open (Draw): Host: Vantaa, Finland; Venue: Energia Areena; Level: Super 500; Prize: $475,000; Format: 32MS/32WS/32MD/32WD/32XD	(England) Ben Lane (England) Sean Vendy	(Malaysia) Aaron Chia (Malaysia) Soh Wooi Yik
7–12 October	Arctic Open (Draw): Host: Vantaa, Finland; Venue: Energia Areena; Level: Super 500; Prize: $475,000; Format: 32MS/32WS/32MD/32WD/32XD	Score: 21–18, 25–27, 21–17	
7–12 October	Arctic Open (Draw): Host: Vantaa, Finland; Venue: Energia Areena; Level: Super 500; Prize: $475,000; Format: 32MS/32WS/32MD/32WD/32XD	(Malaysia) Pearly Tan (Malaysia) Thinaah Muralitharan	(Japan) Rin Iwanaga (Japan) Kie Nakanishi
7–12 October	Arctic Open (Draw): Host: Vantaa, Finland; Venue: Energia Areena; Level: Super 500; Prize: $475,000; Format: 32MS/32WS/32MD/32WD/32XD	Score: 21–7, 21–9	
7–12 October	Arctic Open (Draw): Host: Vantaa, Finland; Venue: Energia Areena; Level: Super 500; Prize: $475,000; Format: 32MS/32WS/32MD/32WD/32XD	(China) Jiang Zhenbang (China) Wei Yaxin	(China) Feng Yanzhe (China) Huang Dongping
7–12 October	Arctic Open (Draw): Host: Vantaa, Finland; Venue: Energia Areena; Level: Super 500; Prize: $475,000; Format: 32MS/32WS/32MD/32WD/32XD	Score: 21–19, 24–22	
14–19 October	Denmark Open (Draw): Host: Odense, Denmark; Venue: Arena Fyn; Level: Super 750; Prize: $950,000; Format: 32MS/32WS/32MD/32WD/32XD	(Indonesia) Jonatan Christie	(China) Shi Yuqi
14–19 October	Denmark Open (Draw): Host: Odense, Denmark; Venue: Arena Fyn; Level: Super 750; Prize: $950,000; Format: 32MS/32WS/32MD/32WD/32XD	Score: 13–21, 21–15, 21–15	
14–19 October	Denmark Open (Draw): Host: Odense, Denmark; Venue: Arena Fyn; Level: Super 750; Prize: $950,000; Format: 32MS/32WS/32MD/32WD/32XD	(South Korea) An Se-young	(China) Wang Zhiyi
14–19 October	Denmark Open (Draw): Host: Odense, Denmark; Venue: Arena Fyn; Level: Super 750; Prize: $950,000; Format: 32MS/32WS/32MD/32WD/32XD	Score: 21–5, 24–22	
14–19 October	Denmark Open (Draw): Host: Odense, Denmark; Venue: Arena Fyn; Level: Super 750; Prize: $950,000; Format: 32MS/32WS/32MD/32WD/32XD	(Japan) Takuro Hoki (Japan) Yugo Kobayashi	(Indonesia) Fajar Alfian (Indonesia) Muhammad Shohibul Fikri
14–19 October	Denmark Open (Draw): Host: Odense, Denmark; Venue: Arena Fyn; Level: Super 750; Prize: $950,000; Format: 32MS/32WS/32MD/32WD/32XD	Score: 21–18, 15–21, 21–19	
14–19 October	Denmark Open (Draw): Host: Odense, Denmark; Venue: Arena Fyn; Level: Super 750; Prize: $950,000; Format: 32MS/32WS/32MD/32WD/32XD	(South Korea) Baek Ha-na (South Korea) Lee So-hee	(South Korea) Kim Hye-jeong (South Korea) Kong Hee-yong
14–19 October	Denmark Open (Draw): Host: Odense, Denmark; Venue: Arena Fyn; Level: Super 750; Prize: $950,000; Format: 32MS/32WS/32MD/32WD/32XD	Score: 15–21, 21–14, 21–15	
14–19 October	Denmark Open (Draw): Host: Odense, Denmark; Venue: Arena Fyn; Level: Super 750; Prize: $950,000; Format: 32MS/32WS/32MD/32WD/32XD	(China) Feng Yanzhe (China) Huang Dongping	(China) Jiang Zhenbang (China) Wei Yaxin
14–19 October	Denmark Open (Draw): Host: Odense, Denmark; Venue: Arena Fyn; Level: Super 750; Prize: $950,000; Format: 32MS/32WS/32MD/32WD/32XD	Score: 21–13, 21–9	
14–19 October	Malaysia Super 100 (Draw): Host: Johor, Malaysia; Venue: EduCity Sports Complex; Level: Super 100; Prize: $110,000; Format: 48MS/32WS/32MD/32WD/32XD	(China) Dong Tianyao	(Japan) Yudai Okimoto
14–19 October	Malaysia Super 100 (Draw): Host: Johor, Malaysia; Venue: EduCity Sports Complex; Level: Super 100; Prize: $110,000; Format: 48MS/32WS/32MD/32WD/32XD	Score: 21–14, 21–17	
14–19 October	Malaysia Super 100 (Draw): Host: Johor, Malaysia; Venue: EduCity Sports Complex; Level: Super 100; Prize: $110,000; Format: 48MS/32WS/32MD/32WD/32XD	(Japan) Nozomi Okuhara	(Malaysia) Wong Ling Ching
14–19 October	Malaysia Super 100 (Draw): Host: Johor, Malaysia; Venue: EduCity Sports Complex; Level: Super 100; Prize: $110,000; Format: 48MS/32WS/32MD/32WD/32XD	Score: 21–18, 21–11	
14–19 October	Malaysia Super 100 (Draw): Host: Johor, Malaysia; Venue: EduCity Sports Complex; Level: Super 100; Prize: $110,000; Format: 48MS/32WS/32MD/32WD/32XD	(Malaysia) Kang Khai Xing (Malaysia) Aaron Tai	(Malaysia) Chia Wei Jie (Malaysia) Lwi Sheng Hao
14–19 October	Malaysia Super 100 (Draw): Host: Johor, Malaysia; Venue: EduCity Sports Complex; Level: Super 100; Prize: $110,000; Format: 48MS/32WS/32MD/32WD/32XD	Score: 21–18, 21–7	
14–19 October	Malaysia Super 100 (Draw): Host: Johor, Malaysia; Venue: EduCity Sports Complex; Level: Super 100; Prize: $110,000; Format: 48MS/32WS/32MD/32WD/32XD	(China) Luo Yi (China) Wang Tingge	(Indonesia) Siti Sarah Azzahra (Indonesia) Az Zahra Ditya Ramadhani
14–19 October	Malaysia Super 100 (Draw): Host: Johor, Malaysia; Venue: EduCity Sports Complex; Level: Super 100; Prize: $110,000; Format: 48MS/32WS/32MD/32WD/32XD	Score: 21–13, 21–12	
14–19 October	Malaysia Super 100 (Draw): Host: Johor, Malaysia; Venue: EduCity Sports Complex; Level: Super 100; Prize: $110,000; Format: 48MS/32WS/32MD/32WD/32XD	(Japan) Yuta Watanabe (Japan) Maya Taguchi	(Indonesia) Dejan Ferdinansyah (Indonesia) Bernadine Wardana
14–19 October	Malaysia Super 100 (Draw): Host: Johor, Malaysia; Venue: EduCity Sports Complex; Level: Super 100; Prize: $110,000; Format: 48MS/32WS/32MD/32WD/32XD	Score: 21–18, 21–12	
21–26 October	French Open (Draw): Host: Cesson-Sévigné, France; Venue: Glaz Arena; Level: Super 750; Prize: $950,000; Format: 32MS/32WS/32MD/32WD/32XD	(Denmark) Anders Antonsen	(France) Christo Popov
21–26 October	French Open (Draw): Host: Cesson-Sévigné, France; Venue: Glaz Arena; Level: Super 750; Prize: $950,000; Format: 32MS/32WS/32MD/32WD/32XD	Score: 21–12, 21–19	
21–26 October	French Open (Draw): Host: Cesson-Sévigné, France; Venue: Glaz Arena; Level: Super 750; Prize: $950,000; Format: 32MS/32WS/32MD/32WD/32XD	(South Korea) An Se-young	(China) Wang Zhiyi
21–26 October	French Open (Draw): Host: Cesson-Sévigné, France; Venue: Glaz Arena; Level: Super 750; Prize: $950,000; Format: 32MS/32WS/32MD/32WD/32XD	Score: 21–13, 21–7	
21–26 October	French Open (Draw): Host: Cesson-Sévigné, France; Venue: Glaz Arena; Level: Super 750; Prize: $950,000; Format: 32MS/32WS/32MD/32WD/32XD	(South Korea) Kim Won-ho (South Korea) Seo Seung-jae	(Indonesia) Fajar Alfian (Indonesia) Muhammad Shohibul Fikri
21–26 October	French Open (Draw): Host: Cesson-Sévigné, France; Venue: Glaz Arena; Level: Super 750; Prize: $950,000; Format: 32MS/32WS/32MD/32WD/32XD	Score: 10–21, 21–13, 21–12	
21–26 October	French Open (Draw): Host: Cesson-Sévigné, France; Venue: Glaz Arena; Level: Super 750; Prize: $950,000; Format: 32MS/32WS/32MD/32WD/32XD	(Japan) Yuki Fukushima (Japan) Mayu Matsumoto	(China) Li Yijing (China) Luo Xumin
21–26 October	French Open (Draw): Host: Cesson-Sévigné, France; Venue: Glaz Arena; Level: Super 750; Prize: $950,000; Format: 32MS/32WS/32MD/32WD/32XD	Score: 17–21, 21–18, 21–15	
21–26 October	French Open (Draw): Host: Cesson-Sévigné, France; Venue: Glaz Arena; Level: Super 750; Prize: $950,000; Format: 32MS/32WS/32MD/32WD/32XD	(China) Feng Yanzhe (China) Huang Dongping	(Thailand) Dechapol Puavaranukroh (Thailand) Supissara Paewsampran
21–26 October	French Open (Draw): Host: Cesson-Sévigné, France; Venue: Glaz Arena; Level: Super 750; Prize: $950,000; Format: 32MS/32WS/32MD/32WD/32XD	Score: 27–25, 21–12	
21–26 October	Indonesia Masters Super 100 II (Draw): Host: Medan, Indonesia; Venue: GOR PBSI Pancing; Level: Super 100; Prize: $110,000; Format: 48MS/32WS/32MD/32WD/32XD	(Indonesia) Zaki Ubaidillah	(China) Dong Tianyao
21–26 October	Indonesia Masters Super 100 II (Draw): Host: Medan, Indonesia; Venue: GOR PBSI Pancing; Level: Super 100; Prize: $110,000; Format: 48MS/32WS/32MD/32WD/32XD	Score: 21–11, 21–8	
21–26 October	Indonesia Masters Super 100 II (Draw): Host: Medan, Indonesia; Venue: GOR PBSI Pancing; Level: Super 100; Prize: $110,000; Format: 48MS/32WS/32MD/32WD/32XD	(Japan) Nozomi Okuhara	(India) Devika Sihag
21–26 October	Indonesia Masters Super 100 II (Draw): Host: Medan, Indonesia; Venue: GOR PBSI Pancing; Level: Super 100; Prize: $110,000; Format: 48MS/32WS/32MD/32WD/32XD	Score: 21–11, 21–9	
21–26 October	Indonesia Masters Super 100 II (Draw): Host: Medan, Indonesia; Venue: GOR PBSI Pancing; Level: Super 100; Prize: $110,000; Format: 48MS/32WS/32MD/32WD/32XD	(Indonesia) Raymond Indra (Indonesia) Nikolaus Joaquin	(South Korea) Choi Sol-gyu (Malaysia) Goh V Shem
21–26 October	Indonesia Masters Super 100 II (Draw): Host: Medan, Indonesia; Venue: GOR PBSI Pancing; Level: Super 100; Prize: $110,000; Format: 48MS/32WS/32MD/32WD/32XD	Score: 21–18, 17–21, 24–22	
21–26 October	Indonesia Masters Super 100 II (Draw): Host: Medan, Indonesia; Venue: GOR PBSI Pancing; Level: Super 100; Prize: $110,000; Format: 48MS/32WS/32MD/32WD/32XD	(Indonesia) Apriyani Rahayu (Indonesia) Siti Fadia Silva Ramadhanti	(Indonesia) Isyana Syahira Meida (Indonesia) Rinjani Kwinnara Nastine
21–26 October	Indonesia Masters Super 100 II (Draw): Host: Medan, Indonesia; Venue: GOR PBSI Pancing; Level: Super 100; Prize: $110,000; Format: 48MS/32WS/32MD/32WD/32XD	Score: 21–11, 21–17	
21–26 October	Indonesia Masters Super 100 II (Draw): Host: Medan, Indonesia; Venue: GOR PBSI Pancing; Level: Super 100; Prize: $110,000; Format: 48MS/32WS/32MD/32WD/32XD	(Indonesia) Marwan Faza (Indonesia) Aisyah Salsabila Putri Pranata	(Malaysia) Jimmy Wong (Malaysia) Lai Pei Jing
21–26 October	Indonesia Masters Super 100 II (Draw): Host: Medan, Indonesia; Venue: GOR PBSI Pancing; Level: Super 100; Prize: $110,000; Format: 48MS/32WS/32MD/32WD/32XD	Score: 16–21, 21–19, 21–3	
28 October – 2 November	Hylo Open (Draw): Host: Saarbrücken, Germany; Venue: Saarlandhalle; Level: Super 500; Prize: $475,000; Format: 32MS/32WS/32MD/32WD/32XD	(Indonesia) Jonatan Christie	(Denmark) Magnus Johannesen
28 October – 2 November	Hylo Open (Draw): Host: Saarbrücken, Germany; Venue: Saarlandhalle; Level: Super 500; Prize: $475,000; Format: 32MS/32WS/32MD/32WD/32XD	Score: 21–14, 21–14	
28 October – 2 November	Hylo Open (Draw): Host: Saarbrücken, Germany; Venue: Saarlandhalle; Level: Super 500; Prize: $475,000; Format: 32MS/32WS/32MD/32WD/32XD	(Denmark) Mia Blichfeldt	(Indonesia) Putri Kusuma Wardani
28 October – 2 November	Hylo Open (Draw): Host: Saarbrücken, Germany; Venue: Saarlandhalle; Level: Super 500; Prize: $475,000; Format: 32MS/32WS/32MD/32WD/32XD	Score: 21–11, 7–21, 21–12	
28 October – 2 November	Hylo Open (Draw): Host: Saarbrücken, Germany; Venue: Saarlandhalle; Level: Super 500; Prize: $475,000; Format: 32MS/32WS/32MD/32WD/32XD	(Chinese Taipei) Chiu Hsiang-chieh (Chinese Taipei) Wang Chi-lin	(Indonesia) Sabar Karyaman Gutama (Indonesia) Muhammad Reza Pahlevi Isfahani
28 October – 2 November	Hylo Open (Draw): Host: Saarbrücken, Germany; Venue: Saarlandhalle; Level: Super 500; Prize: $475,000; Format: 32MS/32WS/32MD/32WD/32XD	Score: 21–19, 21–18	
28 October – 2 November	Hylo Open (Draw): Host: Saarbrücken, Germany; Venue: Saarlandhalle; Level: Super 500; Prize: $475,000; Format: 32MS/32WS/32MD/32WD/32XD	(France) Margot Lambert (France) Camille Pognante	(Chinese Taipei) Hsu Yin-hui (Chinese Taipei) Lin Jhih-yun
28 October – 2 November	Hylo Open (Draw): Host: Saarbrücken, Germany; Venue: Saarlandhalle; Level: Super 500; Prize: $475,000; Format: 32MS/32WS/32MD/32WD/32XD	Score: 21–16, 21–10	
28 October – 2 November	Hylo Open (Draw): Host: Saarbrücken, Germany; Venue: Saarlandhalle; Level: Super 500; Prize: $475,000; Format: 32MS/32WS/32MD/32WD/32XD	(Denmark) Mathias Christiansen (Denmark) Alexandra Bøje	(France) Thom Gicquel (France) Delphine Delrue
28 October – 2 November	Hylo Open (Draw): Host: Saarbrücken, Germany; Venue: Saarlandhalle; Level: Super 500; Prize: $475,000; Format: 32MS/32WS/32MD/32WD/32XD	Score: 23–21, 21–15	

=== November ===
Date	Tournament	Champions	Runners-up
4–9 November	Korea Masters (Draw): Host: Iksan, South Korea; Venue: Wonkwang University Cultural and Sports Center; Level: Super 300; Prize: $240,000; Format: 32MS/32WS/32MD/32WD/32XD	(Singapore) Jason Teh	(Japan) Yudai Okimoto
4–9 November	Korea Masters (Draw): Host: Iksan, South Korea; Venue: Wonkwang University Cultural and Sports Center; Level: Super 300; Prize: $240,000; Format: 32MS/32WS/32MD/32WD/32XD	Score: 21–14, 21–15	
4–9 November	Korea Masters (Draw): Host: Iksan, South Korea; Venue: Wonkwang University Cultural and Sports Center; Level: Super 300; Prize: $240,000; Format: 32MS/32WS/32MD/32WD/32XD	(Chinese Taipei) Chiu Pin-chian	(Vietnam) Nguyễn Thùy Linh
4–9 November	Korea Masters (Draw): Host: Iksan, South Korea; Venue: Wonkwang University Cultural and Sports Center; Level: Super 300; Prize: $240,000; Format: 32MS/32WS/32MD/32WD/32XD	Score: 21–16, 21–15	
4–9 November	Korea Masters (Draw): Host: Iksan, South Korea; Venue: Wonkwang University Cultural and Sports Center; Level: Super 300; Prize: $240,000; Format: 32MS/32WS/32MD/32WD/32XD	(South Korea) Lee Jong-min (South Korea) Wang Chan	(Indonesia) Raymond Indra (Indonesia) Nikolaus Joaquin
4–9 November	Korea Masters (Draw): Host: Iksan, South Korea; Venue: Wonkwang University Cultural and Sports Center; Level: Super 300; Prize: $240,000; Format: 32MS/32WS/32MD/32WD/32XD	Score: 16–21, 21–16, 21–6	
4–9 November	Korea Masters (Draw): Host: Iksan, South Korea; Venue: Wonkwang University Cultural and Sports Center; Level: Super 300; Prize: $240,000; Format: 32MS/32WS/32MD/32WD/32XD	(Japan) Hinata Suzuki (Japan) Nao Yamakita	(South Korea) Kim So-yeong (South Korea) Lee Seo-jin
4–9 November	Korea Masters (Draw): Host: Iksan, South Korea; Venue: Wonkwang University Cultural and Sports Center; Level: Super 300; Prize: $240,000; Format: 32MS/32WS/32MD/32WD/32XD	Score: 21–18, 25–23	
4–9 November	Korea Masters (Draw): Host: Iksan, South Korea; Venue: Wonkwang University Cultural and Sports Center; Level: Super 300; Prize: $240,000; Format: 32MS/32WS/32MD/32WD/32XD	(South Korea) Kim Jae-hyeon (South Korea) Jeong Na-eun	(Malaysia) Jimmy Wong (Malaysia) Lai Pei Jing
4–9 November	Korea Masters (Draw): Host: Iksan, South Korea; Venue: Wonkwang University Cultural and Sports Center; Level: Super 300; Prize: $240,000; Format: 32MS/32WS/32MD/32WD/32XD	Score: 24–22, 21–18	
11–16 November	Japan Masters (Draw): Host: Kumamoto, Japan; Venue: Kumamoto Prefectural Gymnasium; Level: Super 500; Prize: $475,000; Format: 32MS/32WS/32MD/32WD/32XD	(Japan) Kodai Naraoka	(Japan) Kenta Nishimoto
11–16 November	Japan Masters (Draw): Host: Kumamoto, Japan; Venue: Kumamoto Prefectural Gymnasium; Level: Super 500; Prize: $475,000; Format: 32MS/32WS/32MD/32WD/32XD	Score: 21–11, 10–21, 21–15	
11–16 November	Japan Masters (Draw): Host: Kumamoto, Japan; Venue: Kumamoto Prefectural Gymnasium; Level: Super 500; Prize: $475,000; Format: 32MS/32WS/32MD/32WD/32XD	(Thailand) Ratchanok Intanon	(Indonesia) Gregoria Mariska Tunjung
11–16 November	Japan Masters (Draw): Host: Kumamoto, Japan; Venue: Kumamoto Prefectural Gymnasium; Level: Super 500; Prize: $475,000; Format: 32MS/32WS/32MD/32WD/32XD	Score: 21–16, 22–20	
11–16 November	Japan Masters (Draw): Host: Kumamoto, Japan; Venue: Kumamoto Prefectural Gymnasium; Level: Super 500; Prize: $475,000; Format: 32MS/32WS/32MD/32WD/32XD	(South Korea) Kim Won-ho (South Korea) Seo Seung-jae	(Japan) Hiroki Midorikawa (Japan) Kyohei Yamashita
11–16 November	Japan Masters (Draw): Host: Kumamoto, Japan; Venue: Kumamoto Prefectural Gymnasium; Level: Super 500; Prize: $475,000; Format: 32MS/32WS/32MD/32WD/32XD	Score: 20–22, 21–11, 21–16	
11–16 November	Japan Masters (Draw): Host: Kumamoto, Japan; Venue: Kumamoto Prefectural Gymnasium; Level: Super 500; Prize: $475,000; Format: 32MS/32WS/32MD/32WD/32XD	(Malaysia) Pearly Tan (Malaysia) Thinaah Muralitharan	(Japan) Rin Iwanaga (Japan) Kie Nakanishi
11–16 November	Japan Masters (Draw): Host: Kumamoto, Japan; Venue: Kumamoto Prefectural Gymnasium; Level: Super 500; Prize: $475,000; Format: 32MS/32WS/32MD/32WD/32XD	Score: 22–20, 21–19	
11–16 November	Japan Masters (Draw): Host: Kumamoto, Japan; Venue: Kumamoto Prefectural Gymnasium; Level: Super 500; Prize: $475,000; Format: 32MS/32WS/32MD/32WD/32XD	(Thailand) Dechapol Puavaranukroh (Thailand) Supissara Paewsampran	(France) Thom Gicquel (France) Delphine Delrue
11–16 November	Japan Masters (Draw): Host: Kumamoto, Japan; Venue: Kumamoto Prefectural Gymnasium; Level: Super 500; Prize: $475,000; Format: 32MS/32WS/32MD/32WD/32XD	Score: 21–18, 14–21, 21–18	
18–23 November	Australian Open (Draw): Host: Sydney, Australia; Venue: State Sports Centre; Level: Super 500; Prize: $475,000; Format: 32MS/32WS/32MD/32WD/32XD	(India) Lakshya Sen	(Japan) Yushi Tanaka
18–23 November	Australian Open (Draw): Host: Sydney, Australia; Venue: State Sports Centre; Level: Super 500; Prize: $475,000; Format: 32MS/32WS/32MD/32WD/32XD	Score: 21–15, 21–11	
18–23 November	Australian Open (Draw): Host: Sydney, Australia; Venue: State Sports Centre; Level: Super 500; Prize: $475,000; Format: 32MS/32WS/32MD/32WD/32XD	(South Korea) An Se-young	(Indonesia) Putri Kusuma Wardani
18–23 November	Australian Open (Draw): Host: Sydney, Australia; Venue: State Sports Centre; Level: Super 500; Prize: $475,000; Format: 32MS/32WS/32MD/32WD/32XD	Score: 21–16, 21–14	
18–23 November	Australian Open (Draw): Host: Sydney, Australia; Venue: State Sports Centre; Level: Super 500; Prize: $475,000; Format: 32MS/32WS/32MD/32WD/32XD	(Indonesia) Raymond Indra (Indonesia) Nikolaus Joaquin	(Indonesia) Fajar Alfian (Indonesia) Muhammad Shohibul Fikri
18–23 November	Australian Open (Draw): Host: Sydney, Australia; Venue: State Sports Centre; Level: Super 500; Prize: $475,000; Format: 32MS/32WS/32MD/32WD/32XD	Score: 22–20, 10–21, 21–18	
18–23 November	Australian Open (Draw): Host: Sydney, Australia; Venue: State Sports Centre; Level: Super 500; Prize: $475,000; Format: 32MS/32WS/32MD/32WD/32XD	(Indonesia) Rachel Allessya Rose (Indonesia) Febi Setianingrum	(Indonesia) Febriana Dwipuji Kusuma (Indonesia) Meilysa Trias Puspita Sari
18–23 November	Australian Open (Draw): Host: Sydney, Australia; Venue: State Sports Centre; Level: Super 500; Prize: $475,000; Format: 32MS/32WS/32MD/32WD/32XD	Score: 18–21, 21–19, 23–21	
18–23 November	Australian Open (Draw): Host: Sydney, Australia; Venue: State Sports Centre; Level: Super 500; Prize: $475,000; Format: 32MS/32WS/32MD/32WD/32XD	(Malaysia) Chen Tang Jie (Malaysia) Toh Ee Wei	(Indonesia) Jafar Hidayatullah (Indonesia) Felisha Pasaribu
18–23 November	Australian Open (Draw): Host: Sydney, Australia; Venue: State Sports Centre; Level: Super 500; Prize: $475,000; Format: 32MS/32WS/32MD/32WD/32XD	Score: 21–16, 21–11	
25–30 November	Syed Modi International (Draw): Host: Lucknow, India; Venue: Babu Banarasi Das Indoor Stadium; Level: Super 300; Prize: $240,000; Format: 32MS/32WS/32MD/32WD/32XD	(Hong Kong) Jason Gunawan	(India) Srikanth Kidambi
25–30 November	Syed Modi International (Draw): Host: Lucknow, India; Venue: Babu Banarasi Das Indoor Stadium; Level: Super 300; Prize: $240,000; Format: 32MS/32WS/32MD/32WD/32XD	Score: 21–16, 8–21, 22–20	
25–30 November	Syed Modi International (Draw): Host: Lucknow, India; Venue: Babu Banarasi Das Indoor Stadium; Level: Super 300; Prize: $240,000; Format: 32MS/32WS/32MD/32WD/32XD	(Japan) Hina Akechi	(Turkey) Neslihan Arın
25–30 November	Syed Modi International (Draw): Host: Lucknow, India; Venue: Babu Banarasi Das Indoor Stadium; Level: Super 300; Prize: $240,000; Format: 32MS/32WS/32MD/32WD/32XD	Score: 21–16, 21–14	
25–30 November	Syed Modi International (Draw): Host: Lucknow, India; Venue: Babu Banarasi Das Indoor Stadium; Level: Super 300; Prize: $240,000; Format: 32MS/32WS/32MD/32WD/32XD	(Malaysia) Kang Khai Xing (Malaysia) Aaron Tai	(Malaysia) Chia Wei Jie (Malaysia) Lwi Sheng Hao
25–30 November	Syed Modi International (Draw): Host: Lucknow, India; Venue: Babu Banarasi Das Indoor Stadium; Level: Super 300; Prize: $240,000; Format: 32MS/32WS/32MD/32WD/32XD	Score: 21–9, 21–19	
25–30 November	Syed Modi International (Draw): Host: Lucknow, India; Venue: Babu Banarasi Das Indoor Stadium; Level: Super 300; Prize: $240,000; Format: 32MS/32WS/32MD/32WD/32XD	(India) Treesa Jolly (India) Gayatri Gopichand Pullela	(Japan) Kaho Osawa (Japan) Mai Tanabe
25–30 November	Syed Modi International (Draw): Host: Lucknow, India; Venue: Babu Banarasi Das Indoor Stadium; Level: Super 300; Prize: $240,000; Format: 32MS/32WS/32MD/32WD/32XD	Score: 17–21, 21–13, 21–15	
25–30 November	Syed Modi International (Draw): Host: Lucknow, India; Venue: Babu Banarasi Das Indoor Stadium; Level: Super 300; Prize: $240,000; Format: 32MS/32WS/32MD/32WD/32XD	(Indonesia) Dejan Ferdinansyah (Indonesia) Bernadine Anindya Wardana	(Thailand) Pakkapon Teeraratsakul (Thailand) Sapsiree Taerattanachai
25–30 November	Syed Modi International (Draw): Host: Lucknow, India; Venue: Babu Banarasi Das Indoor Stadium; Level: Super 300; Prize: $240,000; Format: 32MS/32WS/32MD/32WD/32XD	Score: 21–19, 21–16	

=== December ===
Date	Tournament	Champions	Runners-up
2–7 December	Guwahati Masters (Draw): Host: Guwahati, India; Venue: Saru Sajai Indoor Stadium; Level: Super 100; Prize: $110,000; Format: 48MS/32WS/32MD/32WD/32XD	(India) Sanskar Saraswat	(India) Mithun Manjunath
2–7 December	Guwahati Masters (Draw): Host: Guwahati, India; Venue: Saru Sajai Indoor Stadium; Level: Super 100; Prize: $110,000; Format: 48MS/32WS/32MD/32WD/32XD	Score: 21–11, 17–21, 21–13	
2–7 December	Guwahati Masters (Draw): Host: Guwahati, India; Venue: Saru Sajai Indoor Stadium; Level: Super 100; Prize: $110,000; Format: 48MS/32WS/32MD/32WD/32XD	(Chinese Taipei) Tung Ciou-tong	(India) Tanvi Sharma
2–7 December	Guwahati Masters (Draw): Host: Guwahati, India; Venue: Saru Sajai Indoor Stadium; Level: Super 100; Prize: $110,000; Format: 48MS/32WS/32MD/32WD/32XD	Score: 21–18, 21–18	
2–7 December	Guwahati Masters (Draw): Host: Guwahati, India; Venue: Saru Sajai Indoor Stadium; Level: Super 100; Prize: $110,000; Format: 48MS/32WS/32MD/32WD/32XD	(Malaysia) Kang Khai Xing (Malaysia) Aaron Tai	(India) Pruthvi Roy (India) K. Sai Pratheek
2–7 December	Guwahati Masters (Draw): Host: Guwahati, India; Venue: Saru Sajai Indoor Stadium; Level: Super 100; Prize: $110,000; Format: 48MS/32WS/32MD/32WD/32XD	Score: 21–13, 21–18	
2–7 December	Guwahati Masters (Draw): Host: Guwahati, India; Venue: Saru Sajai Indoor Stadium; Level: Super 100; Prize: $110,000; Format: 48MS/32WS/32MD/32WD/32XD	(Indonesia) Isyana Syahira Meida (Indonesia) Rinjani Kwinnara Nastine	(Malaysia) Ong Xin Yee (Malaysia) Carmen Ting
2–7 December	Guwahati Masters (Draw): Host: Guwahati, India; Venue: Saru Sajai Indoor Stadium; Level: Super 100; Prize: $110,000; Format: 48MS/32WS/32MD/32WD/32XD	Score: 21–17, 23–21	
2–7 December	Guwahati Masters (Draw): Host: Guwahati, India; Venue: Saru Sajai Indoor Stadium; Level: Super 100; Prize: $110,000; Format: 48MS/32WS/32MD/32WD/32XD	(Indonesia) Marwan Faza (Indonesia) Aisyah Salsabila Putri Pranata	(Thailand) Tanadon Punpanich (Thailand) Fungfa Korpthammakit
2–7 December	Guwahati Masters (Draw): Host: Guwahati, India; Venue: Saru Sajai Indoor Stadium; Level: Super 100; Prize: $110,000; Format: 48MS/32WS/32MD/32WD/32XD	Score: 21–14, 21–16	
9–14 December	Odisha Masters (Draw): Host: Cuttack, India; Venue: Jawaharlal Nehru Indoor Stadium; Level: Super 100; Prize: $110,000; Format: 48MS/32WS/32MD/32WD/32XD	(India) Kiran George	(Indonesia) Muhamad Yusuf
9–14 December	Odisha Masters (Draw): Host: Cuttack, India; Venue: Jawaharlal Nehru Indoor Stadium; Level: Super 100; Prize: $110,000; Format: 48MS/32WS/32MD/32WD/32XD	Score: 21–14, 13–21, 21–16	
9–14 December	Odisha Masters (Draw): Host: Cuttack, India; Venue: Jawaharlal Nehru Indoor Stadium; Level: Super 100; Prize: $110,000; Format: 48MS/32WS/32MD/32WD/32XD	(India) Unnati Hooda	(India) Isharani Baruah
9–14 December	Odisha Masters (Draw): Host: Cuttack, India; Venue: Jawaharlal Nehru Indoor Stadium; Level: Super 100; Prize: $110,000; Format: 48MS/32WS/32MD/32WD/32XD	Score: 21–17, 21–10	
9–14 December	Odisha Masters (Draw): Host: Cuttack, India; Venue: Jawaharlal Nehru Indoor Stadium; Level: Super 100; Prize: $110,000; Format: 48MS/32WS/32MD/32WD/32XD	(Indonesia) Ali Faathir Rayhan (Indonesia) Devin Artha Wahyudi	(Malaysia) Kang Khai Xing (Malaysia) Aaron Tai
9–14 December	Odisha Masters (Draw): Host: Cuttack, India; Venue: Jawaharlal Nehru Indoor Stadium; Level: Super 100; Prize: $110,000; Format: 48MS/32WS/32MD/32WD/32XD	Score: 15–21, 21–12, 21–16	
9–14 December	Odisha Masters (Draw): Host: Cuttack, India; Venue: Jawaharlal Nehru Indoor Stadium; Level: Super 100; Prize: $110,000; Format: 48MS/32WS/32MD/32WD/32XD	(Bulgaria) Gabriela Stoeva (Bulgaria) Stefani Stoeva	(Malaysia) Ong Xin Yee (Malaysia) Carmen Ting
9–14 December	Odisha Masters (Draw): Host: Cuttack, India; Venue: Jawaharlal Nehru Indoor Stadium; Level: Super 100; Prize: $110,000; Format: 48MS/32WS/32MD/32WD/32XD	Score: 21–19, 21–14	
9–14 December	Odisha Masters (Draw): Host: Cuttack, India; Venue: Jawaharlal Nehru Indoor Stadium; Level: Super 100; Prize: $110,000; Format: 48MS/32WS/32MD/32WD/32XD	(Indonesia) Marwan Faza (Indonesia) Aisyah Salsabila Putri Pranata	(Indonesia) Dejan Ferdinansyah (Indonesia) Bernadine Anindya Wardana
9–14 December	Odisha Masters (Draw): Host: Cuttack, India; Venue: Jawaharlal Nehru Indoor Stadium; Level: Super 100; Prize: $110,000; Format: 48MS/32WS/32MD/32WD/32XD	Score: 21–15, 21–10	
17–21 December	BWF World Tour Finals (Draw): Host: Hangzhou, China; Venue: Hangzhou Olympic Sports Center; Level: World Tour Finals; Prize: $3,000,000; Format: 8MS/8WS/8MD/8WD/8XD	(France) Christo Popov	(China) Shi Yuqi
17–21 December	BWF World Tour Finals (Draw): Host: Hangzhou, China; Venue: Hangzhou Olympic Sports Center; Level: World Tour Finals; Prize: $3,000,000; Format: 8MS/8WS/8MD/8WD/8XD	Score: 21-19, 21-9	
17–21 December	BWF World Tour Finals (Draw): Host: Hangzhou, China; Venue: Hangzhou Olympic Sports Center; Level: World Tour Finals; Prize: $3,000,000; Format: 8MS/8WS/8MD/8WD/8XD	(South Korea) An Se-young	(China) Wang Zhiyi
17–21 December	BWF World Tour Finals (Draw): Host: Hangzhou, China; Venue: Hangzhou Olympic Sports Center; Level: World Tour Finals; Prize: $3,000,000; Format: 8MS/8WS/8MD/8WD/8XD	Score: 21-13, 18-21, 21-10	
17–21 December	BWF World Tour Finals (Draw): Host: Hangzhou, China; Venue: Hangzhou Olympic Sports Center; Level: World Tour Finals; Prize: $3,000,000; Format: 8MS/8WS/8MD/8WD/8XD	(South Korea) Kim Won-ho (South Korea) Seo Seung-jae	(China) Liang Weikeng (China) Wang Chang
17–21 December	BWF World Tour Finals (Draw): Host: Hangzhou, China; Venue: Hangzhou Olympic Sports Center; Level: World Tour Finals; Prize: $3,000,000; Format: 8MS/8WS/8MD/8WD/8XD	Score: 21-18, 21-14	
17–21 December	BWF World Tour Finals (Draw): Host: Hangzhou, China; Venue: Hangzhou Olympic Sports Center; Level: World Tour Finals; Prize: $3,000,000; Format: 8MS/8WS/8MD/8WD/8XD	(South Korea) Baek Ha-na (South Korea) Lee So-hee	(Japan) Yuki Fukushima (Japan) Mayu Matsumoto
17–21 December	BWF World Tour Finals (Draw): Host: Hangzhou, China; Venue: Hangzhou Olympic Sports Center; Level: World Tour Finals; Prize: $3,000,000; Format: 8MS/8WS/8MD/8WD/8XD	Score: 21–17, 21–11	
17–21 December	BWF World Tour Finals (Draw): Host: Hangzhou, China; Venue: Hangzhou Olympic Sports Center; Level: World Tour Finals; Prize: $3,000,000; Format: 8MS/8WS/8MD/8WD/8XD	(China) Feng Yanzhe (China) Huang Dongping	(China) Jiang Zhenbang (China) Wei Yaxin
17–21 December	BWF World Tour Finals (Draw): Host: Hangzhou, China; Venue: Hangzhou Olympic Sports Center; Level: World Tour Finals; Prize: $3,000,000; Format: 8MS/8WS/8MD/8WD/8XD	Score: 21–12, 21–17	

== Statistics ==
=== Performance by countries ===
Below are the 2025 BWF World Tour performances by countries. Only countries who have won a title are listed:

Rank	Team	WTF	Super 1000				Super 750						Super 500									Super 300										Total
Rank	Team	CHN	MAS	ENG	INA	CHN	IND	SGP	JPN	CHN	DEN	FRA	INA	THA	MAS	HKG	KOR	FIN	GER	JPN	AUS	THA	GER	FRA	SUI	TPE	USA	CAN	MAC	KOR	IND	Total
1	China	1	1	2	1	4	1	1	3	2	1	1		2	4	5	1	1							4				1			36
2	South Korea	3	2	2	2		1	1	2	2	2	2	1				2			1	1	1	1	3						2		31
3	Thailand		1					2		1			2	1						2		2			1		1	2				15
3	Japan		1	1			1				1	1	1				1	1		1			1			1		2		1	1	15
5	Malaysia						1	1					1	2	1			1		1	1								1		1	11
6	Indonesia					1					1						1		1		2	1				1			1		1	10
7	Denmark				1		1					1							2				1.5	1			1		1			9.5
8	Chinese Taipei																	1	1							2	1	1	1	1		8
9	France	1			1														1					1								4
9	Singapore																					1	1			1				1		4
11	India																				1						1				1	3
12	England																	1														1
12	United States																										1					1
12	Hong Kong																														1	1
15	Netherlands																						0.5									0.5

==== BWF Tour Super 100 ====
Rank	Team	CHN I	CHN II	VIE	INA I	TPE	UAE	MAS	INA II	IND I	IND II	Total
1	China	4	3	2				2				11
1	Indonesia			1	1		1		4	2	2	11
3	Japan					4		2	1			7
4	India						2			1	2	5
5	Chinese Taipei				2	1				1		4
6	Thailand		2	1								3
7	Bulgaria						1				1	2
7	Malaysia							1		1		2
7	South Korea			1	1							2
10	Denmark				1							1
10	Finland						1					1
10	Hong Kong	1										1

=== Performance by categories ===
==== Men's singles ====
Rank	Player	BWTF	1000	750	500	300	100	Total
1	(China) Shi Yuqi		3	1				4
2	(Thailand) Kunlavut Vitidsarn			1	2			3
2	(Indonesia) Jonatan Christie			1	2			3
4	(Denmark) Anders Antonsen		1	1				2
5	(Denmark) Viktor Axelsen			1		1		2
5	(China) Weng Hongyang			1		1		2
7	(China) Li Shifeng				2			2
8	(Singapore) Jason Teh					2		2
9	(China) Sun Chao						2	2
10	(France) Christo Popov	1						1
11	(Chinese Taipei) Chou Tien-chen				1			1
11	(Japan) Kodai Naraoka				1			1
11	(India) Lakshya Sen				1			1
14	(France) Alex Lanier					1		1
14	(India) Ayush Shetty					1		1
14	(Indonesia) Alwi Farhan					1		1
14	(Hong Kong) Jason Gunawan					1		1
14	(Japan) Kenta Nishimoto					1		1
14	(Singapore) Loh Kean Yew					1		1
20	(China) Dong Tianyao						1	1
20	(Chinese Taipei) Wang Po-wei						1	1
20	(Finland) Joakim Oldorff						1	1
20	(Indonesia) Chico Aura Dwi Wardoyo						1	1
20	(Indonesia) Zaki Ubaidillah						1	1
20	(India) Kiran George						1	1
20	(India) Sanskar Saraswat						1	1
20	(Thailand) Panitchaphon Teeraratsakul						1	1

==== Women's singles ====
Rank	Player	BWTF	1000	750	500	300	100	Total
1	(South Korea) An Se-young	1	3	5	1	1		11
2	(China) Chen Yufei			1	1	2		4
3	(China) Wang Zhiyi		1		2			3
4	(Japan) Nozomi Okuhara						3	3
5	(Japan) Akane Yamaguchi				2			2
5	(Thailand) Ratchanok Intanon				2			2
7	(Denmark) Mia Blichfeldt				1			1
8	(Japan) Tomoka Miyazaki					1		1
8	(Japan) Manami Suizu					1		1
8	(Singapore) Yeo Jia Min					1		1
8	(Thailand) Pornpawee Chochuwong					1		1
8	(United States) Beiwen Zhang					1		1
8	(Chinese Taipei) Chiu Pin-chian					1		1
14	(China) Cai Yanyan						1	1
14	(China) Zhang Yiman						1	1
14	(Chinese Taipei) Huang Yu-hsun						1	1
14	(India) Shriyanshi Valishetty						1	1
14	(Thailand) Pitchamon Opatniputh						1	1

==== Men's doubles ====
Rank	Player	BWTF	1000	750	500	300	100	Total
1	(South Korea) Seo Seung-jae	1	3	3	2	2		11
2	(South Korea) Kim Won-ho	1	3	3	2	1		10
3	(South Korea) Jin Yong					1	2	3
3	(Malaysia) Kang Khai Xing					1	2	3
3	(Malaysia) Aaron Tai					1	2	3
6	(Malaysia) Aaron Chia			1	1			2
6	(Malaysia) Soh Wooi Yik			1	1			2
8	(Malaysia) Man Wei Chong				2			2
8	(Malaysia) Tee Kai Wun				2			2
10	(Chinese Taipei) Chiu Hsiang-chieh				1	1		2
10	(Chinese Taipei) Wang Chi-lin				1	1		2
10	(South Korea) Lee Jong-min				1	1		2
10	(South Korea) Wang Chan				1	1		2
14	(Indonesia) Raymond Indra				1		1	2
14	(Indonesia) Nikolaus Joaquin				1		1	2
16	(South Korea) Na Sung-seung						2	2
17	(Indonesia) Fajar Alfian		1					1
17	(Indonesia) Muhammad Shohibul Fikri		1					1
19	(Malaysia) Goh Sze Fei			1				1
19	(Malaysia) Nur Izzuddin			1				1
21	(China) Liang Weikeng				1			1
21	(China) Wang Chang				1			1
21	(England) Ben Lane				1			1
21	(England) Sean Vendy				1			1
25	(Chinese Taipei) Lai Po-yu					1		1
25	(Chinese Taipei) Lee Fang-chih					1		1
25	(Chinese Taipei) Lee Fang-jen					1		1
25	(Chinese Taipei) Tsai Fu-cheng					1		1
25	(Malaysia) Junaidi Arif					1		1
25	(Malaysia) Yap Roy King					1		1
25	(South Korea) Kang Min-hyuk					1		1
25	(South Korea) Ki Dong-ju					1		1
25	(Thailand) Kittinupong Kedren					1		1
25	(Thailand) Dechapol Puavaranukroh					1		1
35	(China) Chen Yongrui						1	1
35	(China) Chen Zhehan						1	1
35	(China) Hu Keyuan						1	1
35	(China) Lin Xiangyi						1	1
35	(India) Hariharan Amsakarunan						1	1
35	(India) Arjun M. R.						1	1
35	(Japan) Kakeru Kumagai						1	1
35	(Japan) Hiroki Nishi						1	1

==== Women's doubles ====
Rank	Player	BWTF	1000	750	500	300	100	Total
1	(China) Liu Shengshu		2	1	1			4
1	(China) Tan Ning		2	1	1			4
3	(South Korea) Kim Hye-jeong			1	2	1		4
3	(South Korea) Kong Hee-yong			1	2	1		4
5	(China) Jia Yifan			1	1	1		3
5	(China) Zhang Shuxian			1	1	1		3
7	(Malaysia) Pearly Tan				3			3
7	(Malaysia) Thinaah Muralitharan				3			3
9	(China) Luo Yi						3	3
9	(China) Wang Tingge						3	3
11	(South Korea) Baek Ha-na	1		1				2
11	(South Korea) Lee So-hee	1		1				2
13	(Japan) Yuki Fukushima		1	1				2
13	(Japan) Mayu Matsumoto		1	1				2
15	(Thailand) Benyapa Aimsaard					2		2
15	(Thailand) Nuntakarn Aimsaard					2		2
15	(Chinese Taipei) Hsieh Pei-shan					2		2
15	(Chinese Taipei) Hung En-tzu					2		2
19	(Indonesia) Siti Fadia Silva Ramadhanti					1	1	2
20	(Bulgaria) Gabriela Stoeva						2	2
20	(Bulgaria) Stefani Stoeva						2	2
22	(Japan) Nami Matsuyama		1					1
22	(Japan) Chiharu Shida		1					1
24	(Japan) Arisa Igarashi			1				1
24	(Japan) Ayako Sakuramoto			1				1
26	(Japan) Hinata Suzuki				1			1
26	(Japan) Nao Yamakita				1			1
26	(France) Margot Lambert				1			1
26	(France) Camille Pognante				1			1
30	(Indonesia) Lanny Tria Mayasari					1		1
30	(Japan) Mizuki Otake					1		1
30	(Japan) Miyu Takahashi					1		1
34	(China) Chen Xiaofei						1	1
34	(China) Feng Xueying						1	1
34	(Chinese Taipei) Lin Xiao-min						1	1
34	(Chinese Taipei) Wang Yu-qiao						1	1
34	(Indonesia) Apriyani Rahayu						1	1
34	(Japan) Ririna Hiramoto						1	1
34	(Japan) Kokona Ishikawa						1	1

==== Mixed doubles ====
Rank	Player	BWTF	1000	750	500	300	100	Total
1	(China) Feng Yanzhe	1	1	2	4	1		9
2	(China) Huang Dongping	1	1	2	4			8
3	(Thailand) Supissara Paewsampran		1	2	1	1		5
3	(Thailand) Dechapol Puavaranukroh		1	2	1	1		5
5	(China) Wei Yaxin			2	1	1		4
5	(Denmark) Alexandra Bøje				1	2	1	4
5	(Indonesia) Marwan Faza						4	4
5	(Indonesia) Aisyah Pranata						4	4
9	(China) Jiang Zhenbang			2	1			3
9	(Denmark) Mathias Christiansen				1	1	1	3
11	(Thailand) Ruttanapak Oupthong					1	1	2
11	(Indonesia) Dejan Ferdinansyah					1	1	2
11	(Indonesia) Bernadine Wardana					1	1	2
14	(China) Chen Fanghui		1					1
14	(China) Guo Xinwa		1					1
14	(France) Delphine Delrue		1					1
14	(France) Thom Gicquel		1					1
18	(Japan) Hiroki Midorikawa				1			1
18	(Japan) Natsu Saito				1			1
20	(Denmark) Rasmus Espersen					1		1
20	(Denmark) Amalie Cecilie Kudsk					1		1
20	(Denmark) Amalie Magelund					1		1
20	(Denmark) Jesper Toft					1		1
20	(Indonesia) Jafar Hidayatullah					1		1
20	(Indonesia) Felisha Pasaribu					1		1
20	(Thailand) Jhenicha Sudjaipraparat					1		1
20	(Netherlands) Robin Tabeling					1		1
20	(South Korea) Kim Jae-hyeon					1		1
20	(South Korea) Jeong Na-eun					1		1
30	(Hong Kong) Ng Tsz Yau						1	1
30	(Hong Kong) Tang Chun Man						1	1
30	(Japan) Yuho Imai						1	1
30	(Japan) Akira Koga						1	1
30	(Japan) Maya Taguchi						1	1
30	(Japan) Yuta Watanabe						1	1
30	(Thailand) Benyapa Aimsaard						1	1

== World Tour rankings ==
The points are calculated from the following levels:

- BWF World Tour Super 1000
- BWF World Tour Super 750
- BWF World Tour Super 500
- BWF World Tour Super 300
- BWF Tour Super 100

Information on Points, Won, Lost, and % columns were calculated after the Australian Open.

Key

(D)C	(Defending) Champion
F	Finalists
SF	Semi-finalists
QF	Quarter-finalists
#R	Round 1/2/3
RR	Round Robin
Q#	Qualification Round 1/2
WD	Withdraw

=== Men's singles ===
The table below was based on the ranking of men's singles as of 26 November 2025.

Rankings		WR	Player		TP	Points	WTF		IND	IND	IND	MAS	IND	INA	THA	GER	FRA	ENG	CHN	SUI	TPE	THA	MAS	SGP	INA	USA	CAN	JPN	CHN	MAC	CHN	HKG	VIE	INA	CHN	TPE	KOR	UAE	FIN	DEN	MAS	INA	FRA	GER	KOR	JPN	AUS	Won	Lost	%
Rankings		WR	Player		TP	Points	Eli	BWTF	300	100	100	1000	750	500	300	300	300	1000	100	300	300	500	500	750	1000	300	300	750	1000	300	100	500	100	100	750	100	500	100	500	750	100	100	750	500	300	500	500	Won	Lost	%
Qualified as World Championships winner
7	Steady	1	(China)	Shi Yuqi	8	76,990	✓	F	–	–	–	C	–	SF	–	–	–	C	–	–	–	–	–	2R	SF	–	–	C	C	–	–	–	–	–	–	–	–	–	–	F	–	–	–	–	–	–	–	32	4	88.89%
Qualified by World Tour Finals Ranking
1	Steady	3	(Thailand)	Kunlavut Vitidsarn	14	93,370	✓	SF	–	–	–	QF	1R	C	–	–	–	2R	–	QF	–	C	–	C	SF	–	–	1R	QF	–	–	–	–	–	QF	–	–	–	F	QF	–	–	SF	–	–	–	–	31	11	73.81%
2	Steady	5	(China)	Li Shifeng	14	90,240	✓	RR	–	–	–	SF	1R	QF	–	–	–	SF	–	SF	–	–	C	2R	QF	–	–	2R	QF	–	–	C	–	–	QF	–	–	–	–	QF	–	–	SF	–	–	–	–	32	11	74.42%
3	Steady	6	(Chinese Taipei)	Chou Tien-chen	23	89,420	✓	RR	–	–	–	QF	QF	1R	–	–	–	2R	–	1R	F	2R	1R	2R	F	SF	QF	2R	SF	–	–	SF	–	–	2R	–	SF	–	C	1R	–	–	2R	1R	–	2R	SF	41	22	65.08%
4	Steady	2	(Denmark)	Anders Antonsen	13	85,410	✓	RR	–	–	–	F	–	1R	–	–	–	1R	–	2R	–	F	–	1R	C	–	–	1R	SF	–	–	–	–	–	SF	–	F	–	–	2R	–	–	C	–	–	–	–	30	11	73.17%
5	Steady	8	(France)	Christo Popov	16	82,030	✓	C	–	–	–	1R	2R	–	–	2R	–	1R	–	F	–	–	QF	SF	2R	–	–	SF	QF	–	–	SF	–	–	SF	–	–	–	2R	QF	–	–	F	1R	–	–	–	31	16	65.96%
6	Steady	4	(Indonesia)	Jonatan Christie	17	80,740	✓	RR	–	–	–	1R	SF	F	–	–	SF	2R	–	–	–	–	–	1R	2R	–	–	1R	2R	–	2R	–	–	–	1R	–	C	–	–	C	–	–	2R	C	–	–	1R	30	12	71.43%
8	▲1	9	(Japan)	Kodai Naraoka	18	76,300	✓	SF	–	–	–	SF	2R	2R	–	–	–	1R	–	–	–	QF	SF	QF	1R	–	SF	QF	1R	–	–	2R	–	–	1R	–	QF	–	QF	2R	–	–	2R	–	–	C	2R	28	18	60.87%
9	▲1	13	(Chinese Taipei)	Lin Chun-yi	18	74,080	✗	–	–	–	–	2R	QF	2R	–	–	F	2R	–	SF	2R	–	–	SF	1R	–	–	2R	2R	–	–	–	–	–	F	–	1R	–	–	1R	–	–	1R	1R	–	QF	SF	27	18	60.00%
10	▲3	11	(India)	Lakshya Sen	19	72,980	✗	–	C	–	–	1R	1R	2R	–	–	–	QF	–	–	–	1R	–	1R	1R	–	–	2R	1R	SF	–	F	–	–	1R	–	–	–	1R	QF	–	–	1R	QF	–	SF	C	28	17	62.22%
11	▼2	12	(China)	Weng Hongyang	15	72,010	✗	–	–	–	–	1R	SF	QF	–	–	–	1R	–	C	–	1R	QF	2R	1R	–	–	QF	1R	–	–	2R	–	–	C	–	QF	–	–	2R	–	–	1R	–	–	–	–	22	13	62.86%
12	▼1	10	(Singapore)	Loh Kean Yew	17	69,910	✗	–	–	–	–	1R	QF	1R	–	F	1R	QF	–	–	C	SF	–	QF	2R	–	–	–	–	–	–	QF	–	–	1R	–	QF	–	–	1R	–	–	1R	2R	–	QF		24	15	61.54%
13	▼1	7	(France)	Alex Lanier	19	67,460	✗	–	–	–	–	1R	1R	1R	–	–	QF	F	–	1R	1R	1R	–	1R	2R	–	–	1R	2R	–	–	1R	–	–	1R	–	2R	–	2R	SF	–	–	1R	SF	–	–	–	16	19	45.71%
14	Steady	14	(Japan)	Kenta Nishimoto	22	65,890	✗	–	–	–	–	1R	1R	QF	–	–	QF	QF	–	QF	–	QF	1R	1R	1R	QF	C	2R	1R	–	–	–	–	–	1R	–	QF	–	2R	1R	–	–	1R	1R	–	F	2R	26	20	56.52%
15	▲2	17	(Indonesia)	Alwi Farhan	15	62,030	✗	–	–	–	–	–	–	–	QF	2R	1R	–	–	–	–	2R	2R	–	2R	–	–	2R	1R	C	–	QF	–	–	1R	–	SF	–	–	1R	–	–	QF	–	–	2R	QF	22	15	59.46%
16	▼1	19	(Singapore)	Jason Teh	24	60,200	✗	–	F	2R	2R	–	2R	QF	C	QF	2R	1R	–	–	–	1R	2R	1R	1R	–	–	1R	1R	2R	–	1R	–	–	1R	–	1R	–	QF	1R	–	–	1R	–	C	2R	–	27	20	57.45%
17	▼1	15	(France)	Toma Junior Popov	16	59,900	✗	–	–	–	–	2R	2R	–	–	SF	–	2R	–	QF	–	–	QF	2R	1R	–	–	1R	QF	–	–	1R	–	–	2R	–	–	–	1R	2R	–	–	1R	2R	–	–	–	16	16	50.00%
18	Steady	24	(Chinese Taipei)	Wang Tzu-wei	18	57,530	✗	–	–	–	–	1R	1R	SF	–	–	1R	QF	–	1R	SF	1R	–	1R	1R	–	–	QF	1R	–	–	1R	–	–	1R	–	2R	–	2R	1R	–	–	1R	1R	–	SF	1R	15	21	41.67%
19	▲3	28	(Denmark)	Rasmus Gemke	21	57,360	✗	–	–	–	–	1R	1R	1R	–	2R	QF	1R	–	2R	–	QF	2R	1R	2R	–	–	1R	1R	–	–	2R	–	–	1R	–	–	–	SF	2R	–	–	1R	2R	–	QF	QF	18	21	46.15%
20	▼1	16	(China)	Lu Guangzu	16	57,350	✗	–	–	–	–	2R	2R	2R	–	–	–	1R	–	1R	–	SF	1R	F	1R	–	–	1R	1R	–	–	1R	–	–	2R	–	1R	–	QF	1R	–	–	1R	–	–	–	–	13	17	43.33%
21	▼1	21	(Chinese Taipei)	Lee Chia-hao	20	55,950	✗	–	–	–	–	1R	1R	1R	–	–	QF	F	–	1R	1R	1R	–	1R	2R	–	–	1R	2R	–	–	1R	–	–	1R	–	2R	–	2R	2R	–	–	2R	1R	–	1R		12	20	37.50%

=== Women's singles ===
The table below was based on the ranking of women's singles as of 26 November 2025.

Rankings		WR	Player		TP	Points	WTF		IND	IND	IND	MAS	IND	INA	THA	GER	FRA	ENG	CHN	SUI	TPE	THA	MAS	SGP	INA	USA	CAN	JPN	CHN	MAC	CHN	HKG	VIE	INA	CHN	TPE	KOR	UAE	FIN	DEN	MAS	INA	FRA	GER	KOR	JPN	AUS	Won	Lost	%
Rankings		WR	Player		TP	Points	Eli	BWTF	300	100	100	1000	750	500	300	300	300	1000	100	300	300	500	500	750	1000	300	300	750	1000	300	100	500	100	100	750	100	500	100	500	750	100	100	750	500	300	500	500	Won	Lost	%
Qualified as World Championships winner
4	Steady	3	(Japan)	Akane Yamaguchi	12	91,570	✓	SF	–	–	–	–	–	–	–	–	–	SF	–	–	–	–	SF	SF	SF	–	–	SF	SF	–	–	–	–	–	SF	–	C	–	C	SF	–	–	QF	–	–	2R	–	37	10	78.72%
Qualified by World Tour Finals Ranking
1	Steady	1	(South Korea)	An Se-young	13	130,550	✓	C	–	–	–	DC	C	–	–	–	C	C	–	–	–	–	–	QF	C	–	–	C	SF	–	–	–	–	–	DC	–	F	–	–	C	–	–	DC	–	–	–	C	59	3	95.16%
2	Steady	2	(China)	Wang Zhiyi	13	115,850	✓	F	–	–	–	F	QF	–	–	–	QF	F	–	–	–	–	DC	F	F	–	–	F	DC	–	–	C	–	–	QF	–	–	–	–	F	–	–	F	–	–	–	–	50	10	83.33%
3	Steady	4	(China)	Han Yue	13	96,720	✓	RR	–	–	–	QF	QF	–	–	–	1R	SF	–	–	–	–	F	SF	SF	–	–	QF	F	–	–	F	–	–	F	–	–	–	–	SF	–	–	SF	–	–	–	–	33	12	73.33%
5	Steady	5	(China)	Chen Yufei	12	84,870	✗	–	–	–	–	–	–	–	–	–	F	QF	–	C	–	C	–	C	QF	–	–	QF	QF	C	–	–	–	–	QF	–	–	–	–	2R	–	–	SF	–	–	–	–	38	7	84.44%
6	▲2	7	(Indonesia)	Putri Kusuma Wardani	16	79,650	✓	RR	–	–	–	QF	–	QF	SF	–	–	2R	–	SF	–	1R	QF	–	QF	–	–	QF	1R	–	–	–	–	–	QF	–	SF	–	–	2R	–	–	1R	F	–	–	F	31	16	65.96%
7	▼1	6	(Thailand)	Pornpawee Chochuwong	15	79,340	✓	RR	–	–	–	2R	F	2R	C	–	2R	QF	–	QF	–	F	–	QF	QF	–	–	QF	1R	–	–	2R	–	–	2R	–	SF	–	–	–	–	–	–	–	–	–	–	31	14	68.89%
8	▲1	8	(Thailand)	Ratchanok Intanon	18	78,150	✓	SF	–	–	–	SF	2R	C	2R	–	1R	1R	–	–	–	QF	SF	2R	–	–	–	1R	1R	–	–	QF	–	–	2R	–	–	–	SF	1R	–	–	1R	–	–	C	SF	30	16	65.22%
9	▼2	9	(Japan)	Tomoka Miyazaki	17	76,550	✓	RR	–	–	–	1R	SF	QF	–	–	QF	QF	–	–	C	SF	–	2R	2R	–	–	2R	1R	–	–	QF	–	–	2R	–	QF	–	–	QF	–	–	QF	–	–	1R		29	16	64.44%
10	Steady	17	(Chinese Taipei)	Chiu Pin-chian	21	66,830	✗	–	–	–	–	2R	1R	2R	–	–	1R	2R	–	1R	2R	1R	2R	1R	1R	–	–	2R	QF	1R	–	2R	–	–	1R	–	2R	–	QF	QF	–	–	–	–	C	SF		22	20	52.38%
11	▲1	14	(Canada)	Michelle Li	15	65,640	✗	–	–	–	–	–	–	1R	–	–	1R	1R	–	SF	–	–	QF	QF	1R	–	SF	2R	1R	–	–	SF	–	–	2R	–	–	–	–	QF	–	–	2R	–	–	2R	SF	22	16	57.89%
12	▲1	21	(Chinese Taipei)	Lin Hsiang-ti	20	62,220	✗	–	–	–	–	2R	1R	2R	–	–	2R	–	–	1R	QF	1R	2R	1R	2R	–	–	1R	2R	F	–	SF	–	–	1R	–	1R	–	1R	–	–	–	–	QF	–	QF	QF	20	20	50.00%
13	▼2	13	(China)	Gao Fangjie	16	61,990	✗	–	–	–	–	2R	2R	1R	–	–	SF	1R	–	–	–	–	QF	1R	QF	–	–	2R	2R	–	–	QF	–	–	1R	–	2R	–	2R	1R	–	–	QF	–	–	–	–	17	16	51.52%
14	Steady	23	(United States)	Zhang Beiwen	16	56,800	✗	–	–	–	–	QF	1R	–	–	–	SF	2R	–	1R	–	–	–	2R	1R	C	–	1R	1R	–	–	QF	–	–	1R	–	–	–	–	1R	–	–	1R	2R	–	2R	–	16	15	51.61%
15	Steady	24	(Denmark)	Line Christophersen	16	55,790	✗	–	–	–	–	1R	1R	2R	–	2R	1R	–	–	2R	–	1R	2R	–	–	SF	1R	–	–	F	–	2R	–	–	2R	–	–	–	2R	2R	–	–	2R	SF	–	–	–	19	17	52.78%
16	▲5	30	(Japan)	Nozomi Okuhara	17	54,980	✗	–	–	–	–	1R	1R	2R	–	–	–	1R	–	–	2R	–	2R	–	1R	1R	QF	–	–	QF	2R	–	–	QF	–	C	–	–	–	–	C	C	–	–	2R	SF		29	14	67.44%
17	▲2	22	(Vietnam)	Nguyễn Thùy Linh	14	54,290	✗	–	–	–	–	2R	1R	QF	–	F	–	1R	–	1R	–	–	QF	–	1R	1R	F	–	–	–	–	–	F	–	1R	–	–	–	–	–	–	–	–	–	F	–	1R	21	14	60.00%
18	▼1	20	(Denmark)	Mia Blichfeldt	12	44,930	✗	–	–	–	–	2R	2R	–	–	SF	–	1R	–	–	–	–	–	–	–	–	–	1R	1R	–	–	1R	–	–	2R	–	–	–	QF	QF	–	–	2R	DC				16	11	59.26%
19	▼1	27	(Japan)	Natsuki Nidaira	18	53,170	✗	–	–	–	–	1R	2R	2R	–	–	2R	1R	–	–	–	–	1R	QF	2R	–	–	1R	1R	QF	–	2R	–	–	1R	–	2R	–	–	2R	–	–	2R	–	–	1R	1R	11	17	39.29%
20	Steady	19	(Singapore)	Yeo Jia Min	16	51,910	✗	–	–	–	–	QF	QF	1R	–	C	1R	1R	–	–	–	QF	–	2R	1R	–	–	2R	2R	–	2R	–	–	–	2R	–	QF	–	–	1R	–	–	1R	–	–	–	–	18	14	56.25%
21	Steady	26	(Japan)	Riko Gunji	12	51,040	✗	–	–	–	–	–	–	–	–	SF	QF	–	–	–	QF	2R	–	–	–	–	–	SF	2R	SF	–	2R	–	–	1R	–	–	–	2R	1R	–	–	2R	–	–	–		18	10	64.29%

=== Men's doubles ===
The table below was based on the ranking of men's doubles as of 26 November 2025.

Rankings		WR	Player		TP	Points	WTF		IND	IND	IND	MAS	IND	INA	THA	GER	FRA	ENG	CHN	SUI	TPE	THA	MAS	SGP	INA	USA	CAN	JPN	CHN	MAC	CHN	HKG	VIE	INA	CHN	TPE	KOR	UAE	FIN	DEN	MAS	INA	FRA	GER	KOR	JPN	AUS	Won	Lost	%
Rankings		WR	Player		TP	Points	Eli	BWTF	300	100	100	1000	750	500	300	300	300	1000	100	300	300	500	500	750	1000	300	300	750	1000	300	100	500	100	100	750	100	500	100	500	750	100	100	750	500	300	500	500	Won	Lost	%
Qualified as World Championships winner
1	Steady	1	(South Korea)	Kim Won-ho	14	129,720	✓	C	–	–	–	C	F	–	–	C	SF	C	–	–	–	–	–	F	C	–	–	C	QF	–	–	–	–	–	C	–	C	–	–	2R	–	–	C	–	–	C	–	59	5	92.19%
1	Steady	1	(South Korea)	Seo Seung-jae	14	129,720	✓	C	–	–	–	C	F	–	–	C	SF	C	–	–	–	–	–	F	C	–	–	C	QF	–	–	–	–	–	C	–	C	–	–	2R	–	–	C	–	–	C	–	59	5	92.19%
Qualified by World Tour Finals Ranking
2	Steady	2	(Malaysia)	Aaron Chia	17	95,320	✓	RR	–	–	–	2R	SF	SF	–	–	1R	1R	–	–	–	C	F	C	1R	–	–	1R	F	–	–	1R	–	–	SF	–	–	–	F	1R	–	–	SF	QF	–	–	–	36	14	72.00%
2	Steady	2	(Malaysia)	Soh Wooi Yik	17	95,320	✓	RR	–	–	–	2R	SF	SF	–	–	1R	1R	–	–	–	C	F	C	1R	–	–	1R	F	–	–	1R	–	–	SF	–	–	–	F	1R	–	–	SF	QF	–	–	–	36	14	72.00%
3	▲1	3	(India)	Satwiksairaj Rankireddy	14	89,020	✓	SF	–	–	–	SF	SF	2R	–	–	–	2R	–	–	–	–	–	SF	QF	–	–	2R	SF	QF	–	F	–	–	F	–	–	–	–	SF	–	–	1R	–	–	–	QF	32	14	69.57%
3	▲1	3	(India)	Chirag Shetty	14	89,020	✓	SF	–	–	–	SF	SF	2R	–	–	–	2R	–	–	–	–	–	SF	QF	–	–	2R	SF	QF	–	F	–	–	F	–	–	–	–	SF	–	–	1R	–	–	–	QF	32	14	69.57%
4	▼1	5	(Malaysia)	Man Wei Chong	17	86,730	✓	RR	–	–	–	SF	1R	C	–	–	1R	1R	–	–	–	2R	C	QF	SF	–	–	QF	QF	–	–	2R	–	–	2R	–	–	–	–	–	–	–	QF	SF	–	1R	QF	29	14	67.44%
4	▼1	5	(Malaysia)	Tee Kai Wun	17	86,730	✓	RR	–	–	–	SF	1R	C	–	–	1R	1R	–	–	–	2R	C	QF	SF	–	–	QF	QF	–	–	2R	–	–	2R	–	–	–	–	–	–	–	QF	SF	–	1R	QF	29	14	67.44%
5	▲1	4	(Malaysia)	Goh Sze Fei	15	81,280	✗	–	–	–	–	1R	C	–	–	–	–	2R	–	1R	–	–	QF	QF	QF	–	–	F	1R	–	–	2R	–	–	QF	–	–	–	–	1R	–	–	QF	–	–	SF	SF	27	14	65.85%
5	▲1	4	(Malaysia)	Nur Izzuddin	15	81,280	✗	–	–	–	–	1R	C	–	–	–	–	2R	–	1R	–	–	QF	QF	QF	–	–	F	1R	–	–	2R	–	–	QF	–	–	–	–	1R	–	–	QF	–	–	SF	SF	27	14	65.85%
6	▲1	8	(Indonesia)	Sabar Karyaman Gutama	16	80,250	✓	SF	–	–	–	2R	–	1R	–	–	–	SF	–	QF	–	QF	–	2R	F	–	–	1R	2R	F	–	QF	–	–	1R	–	–	–	–	2R	–	–	QF	F	–	–	SF	30	16	65.22%
6	▲1	8	(Indonesia)	Muhammad Reza Pahlevi Isfahani	16	80,250	✓	SF	–	–	–	2R	–	1R	–	–	–	SF	–	QF	–	QF	–	2R	F	–	–	1R	2R	F	–	QF	–	–	1R	–	–	–	–	2R	–	–	QF	F	–	–	SF	30	16	65.22%
7	▼2	7	(China)	Liang Weikeng	15	80,160	✓	SF	–	–	–	2R	QF	–	–	–	F	1R	–	–	–	–	QF	QF	2R	–	–	QF	SF	–	–	C	–	–	2R	–	1R	–	QF	SF	–	–	1R	–	–	–	–	27	14	65.85%
7	▼2	7	(China)	Wang Chang	15	80,160	✓	SF	–	–	–	2R	QF	–	–	–	F	1R	–	–	–	–	QF	QF	2R	–	–	QF	SF	–	–	C	–	–	2R	–	1R	–	QF	SF	–	–	1R	–	–	–	–	27	14	65.85%
8	▲2	16	(Chinese Taipei)	Chiu Hsiang-chieh	21	66,720	✓	RR	–	–	–	2R	2R	2R	–	–	2R	1R	–	2R	C	–	1R	2R	1R	–	–	1R	1R	–	–	1R	–	–	2R	–	2R	–	2R	2R	–	–	2R	C	–	SF	2R	25	19	56.82%
8	▲2	16	(Chinese Taipei)	Wang Chi-lin	21	66,720	✓	RR	–	–	–	2R	2R	2R	–	–	2R	1R	–	2R	C	–	1R	2R	1R	–	–	1R	1R	–	–	1R	–	–	2R	–	2R	–	2R	2R	–	–	2R	C	–	SF	2R	25	19	56.82%
9	Steady	11	(Indonesia)	Fajar Alfian	8	66,590	✓	RR	–	–	–	–	–	–	–	–	–	–	–	–	–	–	–	–	–	–	–	QF	C	–	–	–	–	–	SF	–	F	–	–	F	–	–	F	QF	–	–	F	28	7	80.00%
9	Steady	11	(Indonesia)	Muhammad Shohibul Fikri	8	66,590	✓	RR	–	–	–	–	–	–	–	–	–	–	–	–	–	–	–	–	–	–	–	QF	C	–	–	–	–	–	SF	–	F	–	–	F	–	–	F	QF	–	–	F	28	7	80.00%
10	▼1	14	(Thailand)	Dechapol Puavaranukroh	17	66,560	✗	–	QF	–	–	–	QF	SF	SF	–	–	1R	–	C	–	SF	1R	2R	2R	–	–	1R	2R	–	–	1R	–	–	2R	–	–	–	SF	1R	–	–	1R	–	–	–	–	23	16	58.97%
10	▼1	14	(Thailand)	Kittinupong Kedren	17	66,560	✗	–	QF	–	–	–	QF	SF	SF	–	–	1R	–	C	–	SF	1R	2R	2R	–	–	1R	2R	–	–	1R	–	–	2R	–	–	–	SF	1R	–	–	1R	–	–	–	–	23	16	58.97%
11	▼1	19	(Chinese Taipei)	Lee Fang-chih	22	66,430	✗	–	–	–	–	QF	QF	2R	–	QF	1R	1R	–	SF	1R	QF	–	1R	1R	1R	C	1R	1R	SF	–	SF	–	–	2R	–	1R	–	–	–	–	–	–	–	QF	1R	2R	27	20	57.45%
11	▼1	19	(Chinese Taipei)	Lee Fang-jen	22	66,430	✗	–	–	–	–	QF	QF	2R	–	QF	1R	1R	–	SF	1R	QF	–	1R	1R	1R	C	1R	1R	SF	–	SF	–	–	2R	–	1R	–	–	–	–	–	–	–	QF	1R	2R	27	20	57.45%
12	▼1	18	(Malaysia)	Junaidi Arif	22	65,900	✗	–	–	–	–	1R	2R	QF	–	QF	SF	1R	–	–	–	QF	1R	2R	2R	–	–	1R	1R	C	–	QF	–	–	1R	–	1R	–	2R	1R	–	–	QF	1R	–	QF	2R	23	19	54.76%
12	▼1	18	(Malaysia)	Yap Roy King	22	65,900	✗	–	–	–	–	1R	2R	QF	–	QF	SF	1R	–	–	–	QF	1R	2R	2R	–	–	1R	1R	C	–	QF	–	–	1R	–	1R	–	2R	1R	–	–	QF	1R	–	QF	2R	23	19	54.76%
13	▼1	13	(Chinese Taipei)	Lee Jhe-huei	19	64,880	✗	–	–	–	–	2R	1R	1R	–	–	QF	QF	–	QF	–	–	–	1R	1R	–	–	1R	1R	–	–	QF	–	–	2R	–	SF	–	2R	2R	–	–	2R	SF	–	QF	1R	21	17	55.26%
13	▼1	13	(Chinese Taipei)	Yang Po-hsuan	19	64,880	✗	–	–	–	–	2R	1R	1R	–	–	QF	QF	–	QF	–	–	–	1R	1R	–	–	1R	1R	–	–	QF	–	–	2R	–	SF	–	2R	2R	–	–	2R	SF	–	QF	1R	21	17	55.26%
14	▼1	6	(Denmark)	Kim Astrup	14	62,180	✗	–	–	–	–	1R	1R	–	–	–	–	1R	–	–	–	–	SF	SF	2R	–	–	2R	1R	–	–	1R	–	–	2R	–	–	–	QF	1R	–	–	SF	SF	–			17	14	54.84%
14	▼1	6	(Denmark)	Anders Skaarup Rasmussen	14	62,180	✗	–	–	–	–	1R	1R	–	–	–	–	1R	–	–	–	–	SF	SF	2R	–	–	2R	1R	–	–	1R	–	–	2R	–	–	–	QF	1R	–	–	SF	SF	–			17	14	54.84%
15	▼1	17	(China)	Huang Di	18	60,610	✗	–	C	F	C	–	–	1R	2R	–	–	2R	–	–	–	1R	1R	2R	QF	–	–	2R	1R	–	–	QF	–	–	1R	–	1R	–	1R	1R	–	–	1R	–	–	–	–	22	15	59.46%
15	▼1	17	(China)	Liu Yang	18	60,610	✗	–	C	F	C	–	–	1R	2R	–	–	2R	–	–	–	1R	1R	2R	QF	–	–	2R	1R	–	–	QF	–	–	1R	–	1R	–	1R	1R	–	–	1R	–	–	–	–	22	15	59.46%
16	Steady	22	(Chinese Taipei)	Liu Kuang-heng	21	58,530	✗	–	–	–	–	1R	2R	1R	–	–	1R	QF	–	2R	1R	QF	2R	1R	1R	–	–	SF	1R	–	–	1R	–	–	1R	–	1R	–	QF	2R	–	–	1R	–	–	2R	2R	16	19	45.71%
16	Steady	22	(Chinese Taipei)	Yang Po-han	21	58,530	✗	–	–	–	–	1R	2R	1R	–	–	1R	QF	–	2R	1R	QF	2R	1R	1R	–	–	SF	1R	–	–	1R	–	–	1R	–	1R	–	QF	2R	–	–	1R	–	–	2R	2R	16	19	45.71%
17	Steady	10	(China)	Chen Boyang	16	57,020	✗	–	–	–	–	F	1R	–	–	–	QF	1R	–	1R	–	–	1R	1R	2R	–	–	2R	1R	–	–	2R	–	–	1R	–	1R	–	QF	QF	–	–	1R	–	–	–	–	13	15	46.43%
17	Steady	10	(China)	Liu Yi	16	57,020	✗	–	–	–	–	F	1R	–	–	–	QF	1R	–	1R	–	–	1R	1R	2R	–	–	2R	1R	–	–	2R	–	–	1R	–	1R	–	QF	QF	–	–	1R	–	–	–	–	13	15	46.43%
18	Steady	15	(England)	Ben Lane	13	56,840	✗	–	–	–	–	QF	2R	–	–	SF	–	2R	–	QF	–	–	–	1R	–	–	–	–	–	–	–	2R	–	–	2R	–	1R	–	C	QF	–	–	2R	1R	–	–	–	19	12	61.29%
18	Steady	15	(England)	Sean Vendy	13	56,840	✗	–	–	–	–	QF	2R	–	–	SF	–	2R	–	QF	–	–	–	1R	–	–	–	–	–	–	–	2R	–	–	2R	–	1R	–	C	QF	–	–	2R	1R	–	–	–	19	12	61.29%
19	Steady	12	(Japan)	Takuro Hoki	10	56,790	✗	–	–	–	–	–	–	–	–	–	–	–	–	–	–	–	SF	2R	QF	–	–	2R	–	–	2R	2R	–	–	QF	–	SF	–	–	C	–	–	1R	–	–	–	–	19	9	67.86%
19	Steady	12	(Japan)	Yugo Kobayashi	10	56,790	✗	–	–	–	–	–	–	–	–	–	–	–	–	–	–	–	SF	2R	QF	–	–	2R	–	–	2R	2R	–	–	QF	–	SF	–	–	C	–	–	1R	–	–	–	–	19	9	67.86%
20	Steady	26	(Japan)	Hiroki Midorikawa	16	54,150	✗	–	–	–	–	–	–	QF	–	–	–	–	–	SF	SF	2R	2R	1R	1R	–	–	2R	–	–	–	1R	–	–	1R	–	2R	–	–	1R	–	–	1R	1R	–	F	1R	16	16	50.00%
20	Steady	26	(Japan)	Kyohei Yamashita	16	54,150	✗	–	–	–	–	–	–	QF	–	–	–	–	–	SF	SF	2R	2R	1R	1R	–	–	2R	–	–	–	1R	–	–	1R	–	2R	–	–	1R	–	–	1R	1R	–	F	1R	16	16	50.00%
21	Steady	20	(Indonesia)	Leo Rolly Carnando	14	53,530	✗	–	–	–	–	–	–	1R	QF	–	–	F	–	2R	–	–	–	1R	1R	–	–	1R	2R	–	–	2R	–	–	QF	–	1R	–	–	1R	–	–	1R	2R	–	–	–	11	13	45.83%
21	Steady	20	(Indonesia)	Bagas Maulana	14	53,530	✗	–	–	–	–	–	–	1R	QF	–	–	F	–	2R	–	–	–	1R	1R	–	–	1R	2R	–	–	2R	–	–	QF	–	1R	–	–	1R	–	–	1R	2R	–	–	–	11	13	45.83%

=== Women's doubles ===
The table below was based on the ranking of women's doubles as of 26 November 2025.

Rankings		WR	Player		TP	Points	WTF		IND	IND	IND	MAS	IND	INA	THA	GER	FRA	ENG	CHN	SUI	TPE	THA	MAS	SGP	INA	USA	CAN	JPN	CHN	MAC	CHN	HKG	VIE	INA	CHN	TPE	KOR	UAE	FIN	DEN	MAS	INA	FRA	GER	KOR	JPN	AUS	Won	Lost	%
Rankings		WR	Player		TP	Points	Eli	BWTF	300	100	100	1000	750	500	300	300	300	1000	100	300	300	500	500	750	1000	300	300	750	1000	300	100	500	100	100	750	100	500	100	500	750	100	100	750	500	300	500	500	Won	Lost	%
Qualified as World Championships winner
3	▼1	1	(China)	Liu Shengshu	12	103,150	✓	SF	–	–	–	SF	QF	–	–	–	–	SF	–	F	–	–	C	SF	C	–	–	C	C	–	–	2R	–	–	SF	–	–	–	2R	QF	–	–	–	–	–	–	–	41	9	82.00%
3	▼1	1	(China)	Tan Ning	12	103,150	✓	SF	–	–	–	SF	QF	–	–	–	–	SF	–	F	–	–	C	SF	C	–	–	C	C	–	–	2R	–	–	SF	–	–	–	2R	QF	–	–	–	–	–	–	–	41	9	82.00%
Qualified by World Tour Finals Ranking
1	Steady	2	(Malaysia)	Pearly Tan	17	109,740	✓	SF	–	–	–	1R	SF	F	–	–	QF	QF	–	–	–	C	SF	QF	F	–	–	F	SF	–	–	SF	–	–	QF	–	–	–	C	2R	–	–	QF	–	–	C	–	50	14	78.13%
1	Steady	2	(Malaysia)	Thinaah Muralitharan	17	109,740	✓	SF	–	–	–	1R	SF	F	–	–	QF	QF	–	–	–	C	SF	QF	F	–	–	F	SF	–	–	SF	–	–	QF	–	–	–	C	2R	–	–	QF	–	–	C	–	50	14	78.13%
2	Steady	3	(South Korea)	Kim Hye-jeong	13	108,760	✓	RR	–	–	–	2R	F	C	–	–	C	2R	–	–	–	–	–	C	QF	–	–	QF	SF	–	–	–	–	–	F	–	C	–	–	F	–	–	QF	–	–	SF	–	46	10	82.14%
2	Steady	3	(South Korea)	Kong Hee-yong	13	108,760	✓	RR	–	–	–	2R	F	C	–	–	C	2R	–	–	–	–	–	C	QF	–	–	QF	SF	–	–	–	–	–	F	–	C	–	–	F	–	–	QF	–	–	SF	–	46	10	82.14%
4	Steady	4	(China)	Jia Yifan	13	100,940	✓	RR	–	–	–	F	2R	SF	–	–	SF	SF	–	C	–	–	F	SF	2R	–	–	SF	F	–	–	C	–	–	C	–	–	–	–	–	–	–	–	–	–	–	–	44	10	81.48%
4	Steady	4	(China)	Zhang Shuxian	13	100,940	✓	RR	–	–	–	F	2R	SF	–	–	SF	SF	–	C	–	–	F	SF	2R	–	–	SF	F	–	–	C	–	–	C	–	–	–	–	–	–	–	–	–	–	–	–	44	10	81.48%
5	Steady	7	(Japan)	Yuki Fukushima	13	96,760	✓	F	–	–	–	C	QF	QF	–	–	SF	–	–	–	–	–	–	2R	QF	–	–	1R	QF	–	–	–	–	–	QF	–	SF	–	–	SF	–	–	C	–	–	SF	–	33	11	75.00%
5	Steady	7	(Japan)	Mayu Matsumoto	13	96,760	✓	F	–	–	–	C	QF	QF	–	–	SF	–	–	–	–	–	–	2R	QF	–	–	1R	QF	–	–	–	–	–	QF	–	SF	–	–	SF	–	–	C	–	–	SF	–	33	11	75.00%
6	▲1	6	(Japan)	Rin Iwanaga	13	85,220	✓	RR	–	–	–	–	–	–	–	–	–	QF	–	–	–	–	–	F	QF	–	–	2R	2R	–	–	F	–	–	QF	–	F	–	F	QF	–	–	QF	–	–	F	2R	33	13	71.74%
6	▲1	6	(Japan)	Kie Nakanishi	13	85,220	✓	RR	–	–	–	–	–	–	–	–	–	QF	–	–	–	–	–	F	QF	–	–	2R	2R	–	–	F	–	–	QF	–	F	–	F	QF	–	–	QF	–	–	F	2R	33	13	71.74%
7	▼1	5	(South Korea)	Baek Ha-na	11	82,470	✓	DC	–	–	–	QF	QF	–	–	–	F	2R	–	–	–	–	–	QF	SF	–	–	QF	QF	–	–	–	–	–	SF	–	SF	–	–	C	–	–	QF	–	–			31	11	73.81%
7	▼1	5	(South Korea)	Lee So-hee	11	82,470	✓	DC	–	–	–	QF	QF	–	–	–	F	2R	–	–	–	–	–	QF	SF	–	–	QF	QF	–	–	–	–	–	SF	–	SF	–	–	C	–	–	QF	–	–			31	11	73.81%
8	Steady	8	(China)	Li Yijing	14	76,070	✗	–	–	–	–	SF	SF	2R	–	–	–	QF	–	1R	–	1R	1R	QF	SF	–	–	1R	QF	–	–	QF	–	–	2R	–	–	–	–	1R	–	–	F	–	–	–	–	23	15	60.53%
8	Steady	8	(China)	Luo Xumin	14	76,070	✗	–	–	–	–	SF	SF	2R	–	–	–	QF	–	1R	–	1R	1R	QF	SF	–	–	1R	QF	–	–	QF	–	–	2R	–	–	–	–	1R	–	–	F	–	–	–	–	23	15	60.53%
9	Steady	11	(Chinese Taipei)	Hsieh Pei-shan	19	70,130	✓	RR	–	–	–	QF	–	2R	–	–	1R	2R	–	QF	C	–	2R	1R	2R	–	–	2R	2R	C	–	QF	–	–	1R	–	QF	–	SF	1R	–	–	–	–	–	1R	1R	18	12	60.00%
9	Steady	11	(Chinese Taipei)	Hung En-tzu	19	70,130	✓	RR	–	–	–	QF	–	2R	–	–	1R	2R	–	QF	C	–	2R	1R	2R	–	–	2R	2R	C	–	QF	–	–	1R	–	QF	–	SF	1R	–	–	–	–	–	1R	1R	18	12	60.00%
10	Steady	16	(Chinese Taipei)	Hsu Yin-hui	22	64,280	✗	–	–	–	–	2R	2R	2R	–	2R	2R	1R	–	2R	1R	QF	QF	2R	1R	SF	SF	–	–	–	–	1R	–	–	1R	–	2R	–	2R	2R	–	–	1R	F	–	QF	1R	25	22	53.19%
10	Steady	16	(Chinese Taipei)	Lin Jhih-yun	22	64,280	✗	–	–	–	–	2R	2R	2R	–	2R	2R	1R	–	2R	1R	QF	QF	2R	1R	SF	SF	–	–	–	–	1R	–	–	1R	–	2R	–	2R	2R	–	–	1R	F	–	QF	1R	25	22	53.19%
11	▲1	22	(Chinese Taipei)	Hsu Ya-ching	17	59,710	✗	–	–	–	–	–	–	1R	QF	–	–	–	1R	–	QF	SF	2R	–	–	F	QF	–	–	2R	–	2R	–	–	2R	–	1R	–	QF	2R	–	–	–	–	SF	1R	QF	24	15	61.54%
11	▲1	22	(Chinese Taipei)	Sung Yu-hsuan	17	59,710	✗	–	–	–	–	–	–	1R	QF	–	–	–	1R	–	QF	SF	2R	–	–	F	QF	–	–	2R	–	2R	–	–	2R	–	1R	–	QF	2R	–	–	–	–	SF	1R	QF	24	15	61.54%
12	▼1	17	(Chinese Taipei)	Chang Ching-hui	20	57,670	✗	–	–	–	–	2R	1R	QF	–	–	2R	1R	–	2R	QF	1R	–	1R	1R	SF	SF	2R	1R	–	–	–	–	–	1R	–	QF	–	1R	–	–	–	–	SF	–	2R	1R	20	20	50.00%
12	▼1	17	(Chinese Taipei)	Yang Ching-tun	20	57,670	✗	–	–	–	–	2R	1R	QF	–	–	2R	1R	–	2R	QF	1R	–	1R	1R	SF	SF	2R	1R	–	–	–	–	–	1R	–	QF	–	1R	–	–	–	–	SF	–	2R	1R	20	20	50.00%
13	Steady	23	(Malaysia)	Go Pei Kee	16	55,340	✗	–	–	–	–	1R	–	QF	–	QF	QF	–	–	–	–	2R	2R	–	1R	–	–	1R	QF	2R	–	QF	–	–	1R	–	1R	–	–	1R	–	–	1R	QF	–	–	–	15	16	48.39%
13	Steady	23	(Malaysia)	Teoh Mei Xing	16	55,340	✗	–	–	–	–	1R	–	QF	–	QF	QF	–	–	–	–	2R	2R	–	1R	–	–	1R	QF	2R	–	QF	–	–	1R	–	1R	–	–	1R	–	–	1R	QF	–	–	–	15	16	48.39%
14	▲3	18	(Japan)	Rui Hirokami	12	53,890	✗	–	–	–	–	–	–	–	–	–	–	–	–	–	SF	SF	–	–	–	–	–	1R	2R	1R	–	SF	–	–	1R	–	QF	–	–	2R	–	–	2R	–	–	QF	QF	18	12	60.00%
14	▲3	18	(Japan)	Sayaka Hobara	12	53,890	✗	–	–	–	–	–	–	–	–	–	–	–	–	–	SF	SF	–	–	–	–	–	1R	2R	1R	–	SF	–	–	1R	–	QF	–	–	2R	–	–	2R	–	–	QF	QF	18	12	60.00%
15	▼1	15	(Hong Kong)	Yeung Nga Ting	14	53,020	✗	–	–	–	–	1R	QF	1R	–	–	QF	1R	–	QF	–	–	–	1R	2R	–	–	–	2R	–	–	1R	–	–	QF	–	2R	–	QF	1R	–	–	–	–	–	–	–	13	14	48.15%
15	▼1	15	(Hong Kong)	Yeung Pui Lam	14	53,020	✗	–	–	–	–	1R	QF	1R	–	–	QF	1R	–	QF	–	–	–	1R	2R	–	–	–	2R	–	–	1R	–	–	QF	–	2R	–	QF	1R	–	–	–	–	–	–	–	13	14	48.15%
16	▼1	20	(South Korea)	Jeong Na-eun	12	52,160	✗	–	–	–	–	–	–	–	–	–	2R	1R	–	–	QF	F	–	–	–	–	–	QF	1R	–	–	–	–	–	2R	–	1R	–	–	QF	–	–	2R	–	SF	2R	–	17	12	58.62%
16	▼1	20	(South Korea)	Lee Yeon-woo	12	52,160	✗	–	–	–	–	–	–	–	–	–	2R	1R	–	–	QF	F	–	–	–	–	–	QF	1R	–	–	–	–	–	2R	–	1R	–	–	QF	–	–	2R	–	SF	2R	–	17	12	58.62%
17	▼1	27	(Chinese Taipei)	Hu Ling-fang	21	52,020	✗	–	–	–	–	2R	2R	2R	–	–	1R	1R	–	QF	2R	1R	1R	1R	1R	QF	QF	–	–	–	–	1R	–	–	1R	–	2R	–	1R	1R	–	–	1R	–	–	QF	QF	15	20	42.86%
17	▼1	27	(Chinese Taipei)	Jheng Yu-chieh	21	52,020	✗	–	–	–	–	2R	2R	2R	–	–	1R	1R	–	QF	2R	1R	1R	1R	1R	QF	QF	–	–	–	–	1R	–	–	1R	–	2R	–	1R	1R	–	–	1R	–	–	QF	QF	15	20	42.86%
18	▼1	33	(Malaysia)	Ong Xin Yee	16	47,480	✗	–	–	–	–	1R	–	–	2R	–	–	–	–	–	2R	1R	1R	–	2R	–	–	1R	1R	1R	–	–	QF	–	2R	QF	–	–	–	2R	–	–	1R	QF	–	2R	–	12	16	42.31%
18	▼1	33	(Malaysia)	Carmen Ting	16	47,480	✗	–	–	–	–	1R	–	–	2R	–	–	–	–	–	2R	1R	1R	–	2R	–	–	1R	1R	1R	–	–	QF	–	2R	QF	–	–	–	2R	–	–	1R	QF	–	2R	–	12	16	42.31%
19	Steady	28	(Hong Kong)	Lui Lok Lok	13	46,140	✗	–	–	–	–	–	–	1R	QF	–	–	–	–	–	–	2R	1R	1R	–	–	–	2R	2R	QF	–	1R	–	–	2R	–	1R	–	1R	1R	–	–	–	–	–	–	–	8	13	38.10%
19	Steady	28	(Hong Kong)	Tsang Hiu Yan	13	46,140	✗	–	–	–	–	–	–	1R	QF	–	–	–	–	–	–	2R	1R	1R	–	–	–	2R	2R	QF	–	1R	–	–	2R	–	1R	–	1R	1R	–	–	–	–	–	–	–	8	13	38.10%
20	Steady	10	(Indonesia)	Febriana Dwipuji Kusuma	10	45,810	✗	–	–	–	–	1R	–	QF	1R	–	–	2R	–	SF	–	QF	QF	–	QF	–	–	2R	2R	–	–	–	–	–	–	–	–	–	–	–	–	–	–	–	–	–	–	14	10	58.33%
20	Steady	10	(Indonesia)	Amallia Cahaya Pratiwi	10	45,810	✗	–	–	–	–	1R	–	QF	1R	–	–	2R	–	SF	–	QF	QF	–	QF	–	–	2R	2R	–	–	–	–	–	–	–	–	–	–	–	–	–	–	–	–	–	–	14	10	58.33%
21	Steady	21	(Thailand)	Benyapa Aimsaard	10	45,160	✗	–	QF	–	–	2R	–	1R	SF	–	2R	2R	–	2R	–	2R	–	–	–	C	C	–	–	–	–	–	–	–	–	–	–	–	–	–	–	–	–	–	–	–	–	21	9	70.00%
21	Steady	21	(Thailand)	Nuntakarn Aimsaard	10	45,160	✗	–	QF	–	–	2R	–	1R	SF	–	2R	2R	–	2R	–	2R	–	–	–	C	C	–	–	–	–	–	–	–	–	–	–	–	–	–	–	–	–	–	–	–	–	21	9	70.00%

=== Mixed doubles ===
The table below was based on the ranking of mixed doubles as of 26 November 2025.

Rankings		WR	Player		TP	Points	WTF		IND	IND	IND	MAS	IND	INA	THA	GER	FRA	ENG	CHN	SUI	TPE	THA	MAS	SGP	INA	USA	CAN	JPN	CHN	MAC	CHN	HKG	VIE	INA	CHN	TPE	KOR	UAE	FIN	DEN	MAS	INA	FRA	GER	KOR	JPN	AUS	Won	Lost	%
Rankings		WR	Player		TP	Points	Eli	BWTF	300	100	100	1000	750	500	300	300	300	1000	100	300	300	500	500	750	1000	300	300	750	1000	300	100	500	100	100	750	100	500	100	500	750	100	100	750	500	300	500	500	Won	Lost	%
Qualified as World Championships winner
3	▲2	3	(Malaysia)	Chen Tang Jie	13	91,910	✓	SF	–	–	–	SF	SF	QF	–	–	2R	1R	–	–	–	–	–	2R	SF	–	–	SF	2R	SF	–	–	–	–	F	–	–	–	–	SF	–	–	QF	–	–	C	C	35	13	72.92%
3	▲2	3	(Malaysia)	Toh Ee Wei	13	91,910	✓	SF	–	–	–	SF	SF	QF	–	–	2R	1R	–	–	–	–	–	2R	SF	–	–	SF	2R	SF	–	–	–	–	F	–	–	–	–	SF	–	–	QF	–	–	C	C	35	13	72.92%
Qualified by World Tour Finals Ranking
1	Steady	4	(Thailand)	Dechapol Puavaranukroh	19	114,420	✓	RR	C	–	–	C	QF	SF	C	–	–	1R	–	SF	–	QF	1R	C	F	–	–	F	2R	–	–	2R	–	–	C	–	–	–	SF	2R	–	–	F	–	–	DC	–	58	13	81.69%
1	Steady	4	(Thailand)	Supissara Paewsampran	19	114,420	✓	RR	C	–	–	C	QF	SF	C	–	–	1R	–	SF	–	QF	1R	C	F	–	–	F	2R	–	–	2R	–	–	C	–	–	–	SF	2R	–	–	F	–	–	DC	–	58	13	81.69%
2	Steady	2	(China)	Feng Yanzhe	11	105,700	✓	C	–	–	–	F	–	–	–	–	–	–	–	–	–	C	C	–	–	–	–	SF	C	–	–	C	–	–	SF	–	C	–	F	C	–	–	C	–	–	–	–	44	4	91.67%
2	Steady	2	(China)	Huang Dongping	11	105,700	✓	C	–	–	–	F	–	–	–	–	–	–	–	–	–	C	C	–	–	–	–	SF	C	–	–	C	–	–	SF	–	C	–	F	C	–	–	C	–	–	–	–	44	4	91.67%
4	▼1	1	(China)	Jiang Zhenbang	12	91,730	✓	F	–	–	–	2R	C	–	–	–	–	–	–	–	–	1R	F	–	–	–	–	C	F	–	–	QF	–	–	SF	–	F	–	C	F	–	–	2R	–	–	–	–	34	8	80.95%
4	▼1	1	(China)	Wei Yaxin	12	91,730	✓	F	–	–	–	2R	C	–	–	–	–	–	–	–	–	1R	F	–	–	–	–	C	F	–	–	QF	–	–	SF	–	F	–	C	F	–	–	2R	–	–	–	–	34	8	80.95%
5	▼1	6	(China)	Guo Xinwa	15	85,740	✗	–	–	–	–	2R	QF	F	–	–	–	C	–	2R	–	2R	2R	SF	1R	–	–	1R	SF	–	–	F	–	–	QF	–	QF	–	1R	QF	–	–	–	–	–	–	–	29	14	67.44%
5	▼1	6	(China)	Chen Fanghui	15	85,740	✗	–	–	–	–	2R	QF	F	–	–	–	C	–	2R	–	2R	2R	SF	1R	–	–	1R	SF	–	–	F	–	–	QF	–	QF	–	1R	QF	–	–	–	–	–	–	–	29	14	67.44%
6	Steady	9	(Malaysia)	Goh Soon Huat	17	80,390	✓	RR	–	–	–	SF	SF	QF	–	–	–	QF	–	QF	–	–	1R	QF	QF	–	–	QF	1R	–	–	2R	–	–	2R	–	QF	–	QF	QF	–	–	QF	–	–	1R	–	28	17	62.22%
6	Steady	9	(Malaysia)	Shevon Jemie Lai	17	80,390	✓	RR	–	–	–	SF	SF	QF	–	–	–	QF	–	QF	–	–	1R	QF	QF	–	–	QF	1R	–	–	2R	–	–	2R	–	QF	–	QF	QF	–	–	QF	–	–	1R	–	28	17	62.22%
7	Steady	5	(France)	Thom Gicquel	14	77,320	✓	RR	–	–	–	QF	F	–	–	–	1R	QF	–	QF	–	–	–	1R	C	–	–	2R	1R	–	–	–	–	–	1R	–	–	–	–	1R	–	–	QF	F	–	F	–	26	13	66.67%
7	Steady	5	(France)	Delphine Delrue	14	77,320	✓	RR	–	–	–	QF	F	–	–	–	1R	QF	–	QF	–	–	–	1R	C	–	–	2R	1R	–	–	–	–	–	1R	–	–	–	–	1R	–	–	QF	F	–	F	–	26	13	66.67%
8	Steady	8	(Japan)	Hiroki Midorikawa	14	74,050	✓	SF	–	–	–	QF	QF	C	–	–	QF	1R	–	–	2R	2R	–	–	QF	–	–	QF	2R	–	–	–	–	–	1R	–	2R	–	–	1R	–	–	1R	–	–	2R	–	19	13	60.00%
8	Steady	8	(Japan)	Natsu Saito	14	74,050	✓	SF	–	–	–	QF	QF	C	–	–	QF	1R	–	–	2R	2R	–	–	QF	–	–	QF	2R	–	–	–	–	–	1R	–	2R	–	–	1R	–	–	1R	–	–	2R	–	19	13	60.00%
9	▲1	10	(Indonesia)	Jafar Hidayatullah	17	72,700	✓	RR	–	–	–	–	–	2R	SF	QF	2R	–	–	–	C	2R	–	QF	2R	–	–	2R	SF	–	–	2R	–	–	2R	–	2R	–	–	1R	–	–	2R	QF	–	–	F	30	16	65.22%
9	▲1	10	(Indonesia)	Felisha Pasaribu	17	72,700	✓	RR	–	–	–	–	–	2R	SF	QF	2R	–	–	–	C	2R	–	QF	2R	–	–	2R	SF	–	–	2R	–	–	2R	–	2R	–	–	1R	–	–	2R	QF	–	–	F	30	16	65.22%
10	▼1	13	(Thailand)	Ruttanapak Oupthong	20	72,310	✗	–	–	–	–	1R	QF	–	2R	–	SF	2R	–	2R	–	1R	–	1R	2R	F	C	1R	2R	–	–	–	–	–	QF	–	2R	–	–	2R	–	–	2R	SF	–	2R	SF	31	19	62.00%
10	▼1	13	(Thailand)	Jhenicha Sudjaipraparat	20	72,310	✗	–	–	–	–	1R	QF	–	2R	–	SF	2R	–	2R	–	1R	–	1R	2R	F	C	1R	2R	–	–	–	–	–	QF	–	2R	–	–	2R	–	–	2R	SF	–	2R	SF	31	19	62.00%
11	Steady	16	(Chinese Taipei)	Ye Hong-wei	22	64,220	✗	–	–	–	–	1R	2R	–	–	2R	1R	1R	–	1R	QF	1R	SF	SF	1R	–	–	2R	1R	–	–	2R	–	–	QF	–	1R	–	2R	1R	–	–	2R	1R	–	SF	QF	21	21	50.00%
11	Steady	16	(Chinese Taipei)	Nicole Gonzales Chan	22	64,220	✗	–	–	–	–	1R	2R	–	–	2R	1R	1R	–	1R	QF	1R	SF	SF	1R	–	–	2R	1R	–	–	2R	–	–	QF	–	1R	–	2R	1R	–	–	2R	1R	–	SF	QF	21	21	50.00%
12	Steady	19	(Indonesia)	Amri Syahnawi	17	57,070	✗	–	–	–	–	–	–	1R	QF	1R	2R	–	–	–	2R	SF	2R	–	2R	–	–	2R	2R	SF	–	1R	–	–	2R	–	SF	–	–	1R	–	–	1R	2R	–	–	–	19	17	52.78%
12	Steady	19	(Indonesia)	Nita Violina Marwah	17	57,070	✗	–	–	–	–	–	–	1R	QF	1R	2R	–	–	–	2R	SF	2R	–	2R	–	–	2R	2R	SF	–	1R	–	–	2R	–	SF	–	–	1R	–	–	1R	2R	–	–	–	19	17	52.78%
13	Steady	11	(Denmark)	Jesper Toft	15	57,620	✗	–	–	–	–	–	–	–	–	1R	C	2R	–	1R	–	–	1R	QF	QF	–	–	1R	1R	–	–	QF	–	–	2R	–	–	–	2R	1R	–	–	1R	QF	–	–	–	16	14	53.33%
13	Steady	11	(Denmark)	Amalie Magelund	15	57,620	✗	–	–	–	–	–	–	–	–	1R	C	2R	–	1R	–	–	1R	QF	QF	–	–	1R	1R	–	–	QF	–	–	2R	–	–	–	2R	1R	–	–	1R	QF	–	–	–	16	14	53.33%
14	Steady	17	(India)	Dhruv Kapila	17	55,890	✗	–	F	SF	–	2R	2R	2R	–	SF	1R	1R	–	–	–	–	QF	1R	1R	1R	1R	–	–	2R	–	1R	–	–	1R	–	–	–	QF	2R	–	–	–	–	–	–	–	19	18	51.35%
14	Steady	17	(India)	Tanisha Crasto	17	55,890	✗	–	F	SF	–	2R	2R	2R	–	SF	1R	1R	–	–	–	–	QF	1R	1R	1R	1R	–	–	2R	–	1R	–	–	1R	–	–	–	QF	2R	–	–	–	–	–	–	–	19	18	51.35%
15	Steady	7	(Hong Kong)	Tang Chun Man	10	55,330	✗	–	–	–	–	–	–	–	–	–	–	–	–	–	–	SF	–	F	1R	–	–	QF	QF	–	–	QF	–	–	QF	–	2R	–	–	1R	–	–	SF	–	–	–	–	19	10	65.52%
15	Steady	7	(Hong Kong)	Tse Ying Suet	10	55,330	✗	–	–	–	–	–	–	–	–	–	–	–	–	–	–	SF	–	F	1R	–	–	QF	QF	–	–	QF	–	–	QF	–	2R	–	–	1R	–	–	SF	–	–	–	–	19	10	65.52%
16	Steady	22	(China)	Gao Jiaxuan	15	55,060	✗	–	–	–	–	–	–	2R	SF	QF	–	–	2R	–	–	F	1R	–	–	–	–	1R	2R	2R	–	2R	–	–	1R	–	2R	–	QF	2R	–	–	1R	–	–	–	–	18	14	56.25%
16	Steady	22	(China)	Wu Mengying	15	55,060	✗	–	–	–	–	–	–	2R	SF	QF	–	–	2R	–	–	F	1R	–	–	–	–	1R	2R	2R	–	2R	–	–	1R	–	2R	–	QF	2R	–	–	1R	–	–	–	–	18	14	56.25%
17	▼1	14	(China)	Cheng Xing	11	54,830	✗	–	–	–	–	QF	2R	QF	–	–	–	–	–	–	–	–	SF	2R	SF	–	–	1R	1R	QF	–	1R	–	–	1R	–	QF	–	–	–	–	–	–	–	–	–	–	16	12	57.14%
17	▼1	14	(China)	Zhang Chi	11	54,830	✗	–	–	–	–	QF	2R	QF	–	–	–	–	–	–	–	–	SF	2R	SF	–	–	1R	1R	QF	–	1R	–	–	1R	–	QF	–	–	–	–	–	–	–	–	–	–	16	12	57.14%
18	▲4	12	(Denmark)	Mathias Christiansen	9	54,060	✗	–	–	–	–	–	–	–	–	–	–	–	–	–	–	–	–	–	–	–	–	–	–	C	–	–	2R	C	–	–	SF	–	–	QF	–	–	SF	C	–	QF	QF	28	6	82.35%
18	▲4	12	(Denmark)	Alexandra Bøje	9	54,060	✗	–	–	–	–	–	–	–	–	–	–	–	–	–	–	–	–	–	–	–	–	–	–	C	–	–	2R	C	–	–	SF	–	–	QF	–	–	SF	C	–	QF	QF	28	6	82.35%
19	▲2	18	(Chinese Taipei)	Yang Po-hsuan	18	53,140	✗	–	–	–	–	QF	QF	1R	–	–	QF	2R	–	1R	–	–	–	1R	1R	–	–	1R	1R	–	–	1R	–	–	1R	–	1R	–	2R	1R	–	–	1R	2R	–	QF	QF	13	19	40.63%
19	▲2	18	(Chinese Taipei)	Hu Ling-fang	18	53,140	✗	–	–	–	–	QF	QF	1R	–	–	QF	2R	–	1R	–	–	–	1R	1R	–	–	1R	1R	–	–	1R	–	–	1R	–	1R	–	2R	1R	–	–	1R	2R	–	QF	QF	13	19	40.63%
20	▼1	25	(Indonesia)	Adnan Maulana	16	53,110	✗	–	–	–	–	–	–	1R	QF	1R	QF	–	–	–	1R	QF	1R	–	QF	–	–	–	–	QF	–	SF	–	–	1R	–	1R	–	–	2R	–	–	1R	2R	–	–	2R	16	16	50.00%
20	▼1	25	(Indonesia)	Indah Cahya Sari Jamil	16	53,110	✗	–	–	–	–	–	–	1R	QF	1R	QF	–	–	–	1R	QF	1R	–	QF	–	–	–	–	QF	–	SF	–	–	1R	–	1R	–	–	2R	–	–	1R	2R	–	–	2R	16	16	50.00%
21	▼3	20	(Japan)	Yuichi Shimogami	13	51,900	✗	–	–	–	–	–	–	–	–	2R	1R	–	–	–	SF	1R	–	QF	2R	–	–	QF	1R	–	–	–	–	–	2R	–	2R	–	–	2R	–	–	2R	–	–	2R	–	14	13	51.85%
21	▼3	20	(Japan)	Sayaka Hobara	13	51,900	✗	–	–	–	–	–	–	–	–	2R	1R	–	–	–	SF	1R	–	QF	2R	–	–	QF	1R	–	–	–	–	–	2R	–	2R	–	–	2R	–	–	2R	–	–	2R	–	14	13	51.85%
